= Australia women's cricket team in Bangladesh in 2023–24 =

International cricket tour

| | Bangladesh | Australia |
- Dates: 21 March – 4 April 2024
| Captains | Nigar Sultana | Alyssa Healy |

One Day International series
- Results: Australia won the 3-match series 3–0
| Most runs | Nigar Sultana (44) | Alyssa Healy (72) |
| Most wickets | Sultana Khatun (4) | Ashleigh Gardner (8) |
- Player of the series: Ashleigh Gardner (Aus)

Twenty20 International series
- Results: Australia won the 3-match series 3–0
| Most runs | Nigar Sultana (96) | Alyssa Healy (110) |
| Most wickets | Nahida Akter (5) | Sophie Molineux (6) |
- Player of the series: Sophie Molineux (Aus)

The Australia women's cricket team toured Bangladesh in March and April 2024 to play three One Day International (ODI) and three Twenty20 International (T20I) matches. The ODI series formed part of the 2022–2025 ICC Women's Championship. The fixtures for the tour were confirmed by Bangladesh Cricket Board (BCB) in February 2024. The venue for all the matches was the Sher-e-Bangla National Cricket Stadium in Mirpur, Dhaka.

It was the Australia women's side's first tour to Bangladesh and first ever bilateral series between the two sides.

Going into the series, Bangladesh had never beaten Australia in any format of women's international cricket.

Australia won the ODI series 3–0, with the hosts failing to reach a total of 100 runs in any of their batting innings. Bangladesh's Fariha Trisna became the first female fast bowler to take two T20I hat-tricks, achieving a hat-trick in the final over of the Australian innings during the second T20I, but Australia won all three T20I matches with big margins and completed a clean sweep of the series.

== Squads ==
| Bangladesh | | Australia | |
| ODIs | T20Is | ODIs | T20Is |
|---|---|---|---|
| Nigar Sultana (c, wk); Nahida Akter (vc); Farzana Akter; Marufa Akter; Shorna Akter; Sumaiya Akter; Disha Biswas; Fargana Hoque; Rabeya Khan; Fahima Khatun; Murshida Khatun; Sultana Khatun; Ritu Moni; Sobhana Mostary; Nishita Akter Nishi | Nigar Sultana (c, wk); Nahida Akter (vc); Dilara Akter; Farzana Akter; Marufa Akter; Shorna Akter; Sumaiya Akter; Rabeya Khan; Fahima Khatun; Murshida Khatun; Shorifa Khatun; Sultana Khatun; Ritu Moni; Sobhana Mostary; Fariha Trisna | Alyssa Healy (c, wk); Tahlia McGrath (vc); ~~Darcie Brown~~; Ashleigh Gardner; Kim Garth; Grace Harris; Alana King; Phoebe Litchfield; Sophie Molineux; Beth Mooney (wk); Ellyse Perry; Megan Schutt; Annabel Sutherland; Tayla Vlaeminck; Georgia Wareham | Alyssa Healy (c, wk); Tahlia McGrath (vc); ~~Darcie Brown~~; Ashleigh Gardner; Kim Garth; Grace Harris; Alana King; Phoebe Litchfield; Sophie Molineux; Beth Mooney (wk); Ellyse Perry; Megan Schutt; Annabel Sutherland; Tayla Vlaeminck; Georgia Wareham |

On 15 March 2024, Darcie Brown was ruled out of the tour due to stress injury, with Grace Harris named as her replacement in Australia's ODI squad.

== ODI series ==
=== 1st ODI ===
21 March 2024
09:30
Scorecard

| Australia; 213/7 (50 overs) | v | Bangladesh; 95 (36 overs) |
| Annabel Sutherland 58* (76); Nahida Akter 2/27 (10 overs) | | Nigar Sultana 27 (64); Ashleigh Gardner 3/22 (5 overs) |

Australia won by 118 runs
Sher-e-Bangla National Cricket Stadium, Dhaka
Umpires: Vrinda Rathi (Ind) and Gazi Sohel (Ban)
Player of the match: Alana King (Aus)

- Bangladesh won the toss and elected to field.
- Women's Championship points: Australia 2, Bangladesh 0.
- Nahida Akter became the leading wicket-taker for Bangladesh in women's ODIs, passing the previous record of 52 wickets set by Salma Khatun.

=== 2nd ODI ===
24 March 2024
09:30
Scorecard

| Bangladesh; 97 (44.1 overs) | v | Australia; 98/4 (23.5 overs) |
| Nahida Akter 22 (47); Sophie Molineux 3/10 (10 overs) | | Ellyse Perry 35* (50); Sultana Khatun 1/23 (5 overs) |

Australia won by 6 wickets
Sher-e-Bangla National Cricket Stadium, Dhaka
Umpires: Vrinda Rathi (Ind) and Gazi Sohel (Ban)
Player of the match: Sophie Molineux (Aus)

- Bangladesh won the toss and elected to bat.
- Women's Championship points: Australia 2, Bangladesh 0.

=== 3rd ODI ===
27 March 2024
09:30
Scorecard

| Bangladesh; 89 (26.2 overs) | v | Australia; 93/2 (18.3 overs) |
| Nigar Sultana 16 (39); Kim Garth 3/11 (7 overs) | | Alyssa Healy 33 (34); Rabeya Khan 1/21 (5 overs) |

Australia won by 8 wickets
Sher-e-Bangla National Cricket Stadium, Dhaka
Umpires: Tanvir Ahmed (Ban) and Vrinda Rathi (Ind)
Player of the match: Kim Garth (Aus)

- Australia won the toss and elected to field.
- Sumaiya Akter (Ban) made her ODI debut.
- Alyssa Healy (Aus) became the fastest cricketer to score 3,000 runs in women's ODIs, in terms of balls faced (3059).
- Women's Championship points: Australia 2, Bangladesh 0.

== T20I series ==
=== 1st T20I ===
31 March 2024
12:00
Scorecard

| Bangladesh; 126/4 (20 overs) | v | Australia; 127/0 (13 overs) |
| Nigar Sultana 63* (64); Sophie Molineux 2/25 (4 overs) | | Alyssa Healy 65* (42) |

Australia won by 10 wickets
Sher-e-Bangla National Cricket Stadium, Dhaka
Umpires: Ali Arman (Ban) and Vrinda Rathi (Ind)
Player of the match: Alyssa Healy (Aus)

- Bangladesh won the toss and elected to bat.

=== 2nd T20I ===
2 April 2024
12:00
Scorecard

| Australia; 161/8 (20 overs) | v | Bangladesh; 103/9 (20 overs) |
| Georgia Wareham 57 (30); Fariha Trisna 4/19 (4 overs) | | Dilara Akter 27 (25); Sophie Molineux 3/10 (4 overs) |

Australia won by 58 runs
Sher-e-Bangla National Cricket Stadium, Dhaka
Umpires: Morshed Ali Khan (Ban) and Vrinda Rathi (Ind)
Player of the match: Georgia Wareham (Aus)

- Australia won the toss and elected to bat.
- Fariha Trisna became the first cricketer for Bangladesh to take a hat-trick against Australia and to take multiple hat-tricks in women's T20Is.

=== 3rd T20I ===
4 April 2024
12:00
Scorecard

| Australia; 155/6 (20 overs) | v | Bangladesh; 78 (18.1 overs) |
| Alyssa Healy 45 (29); Nahida Akter 3/31 (4 overs) | | Nigar Sultana 32 (31); Tayla Vlaeminck 3/12 (4 overs) |

Australia won by 77 runs
Sher-e-Bangla National Cricket Stadium, Dhaka
Umpires: Shathira Jakir (Ban) and Vrinda Rathi (Ind)
Player of the match: Tayla Vlaeminck (Aus)

- Australia won the toss and elected to bat.
