= Bangladesh women's cricket team in South Africa in 2023–24 =

International cricket tour

	South Africa	Bangladesh
- Dates: 3 – 23 December 2023
Captains	Laura Wolvaardt (Note: Tazmin Brits captained South Africa in the first T20I.)	Nigar Sultana

One Day International series
- Results: South Africa won the 3-match series 2–1
Most runs	Laura Wolvaardt (185)	Fargana Hoque (145)
Most wickets	Marizanne Kapp (4)	Rabeya Khan (4)
- Player of the series: Laura Wolvaardt (SA)

Twenty20 International series
- Results: 3-match series drawn 1–1
Most runs	Anneke Bosch (76)	Murshida Khatun (66)
Most wickets	Ayanda Hlubi (2); Masabata Klaas (2)	Shorna Akter (5)
- Player of the series: Shorna Akter (Ban)

The Bangladesh women's cricket team toured South Africa in December 2023 to play three One Day International (ODI) and three Twenty20 International (T20I) matches. The ODI series formed part of the 2022–2025 ICC Women's Championship. South Africa won the ODI series 2–1, while the T20I series ended in a 1–1 draw.

== Squads ==
South Africa		Bangladesh
ODIs	T20Is	ODIs & T20Is
Laura Wolvaardt (c); Anneke Bosch; Tazmin Brits; Nadine de Klerk; Mieke de Ridder (wk); Lara Goodall; Sinalo Jafta (wk); Marizanne Kapp; Ayabonga Khaka; Masabata Klaas; Suné Luus; Eliz-Mari Marx; Nonkululeko Mlaba; Tumi Sekhukhune; Delmi Tucker	Laura Wolvaardt (c); Anneke Bosch; Tazmin Brits; Annerie Dercksen; Mieke de Ridder (wk); Lara Goodall; Ayanda Hlubi; Sinalo Jafta (wk); Masabata Klaas; Suné Luus; Eliz-Mari Marx; Nonkululeko Mlaba; Tumi Sekhukhune; Nondumiso Shangase; Delmi Tucker	Nigar Sultana (c, wk); Nahida Akter (vc); Marufa Akter; Shorna Akter; Sumaiya Akter; Disha Biswas; Fargana Hoque; Fahima Khatun; Murshida Khatun; Shorifa Khatun; Rabeya Khan; Sultana Khatun; Lata Mondal; Ritu Moni; Sobhana Mostary; Shamima Sultana (wk)

== Tour match ==
12 December 2023
10:00
Scorecard

Bangladesh; 173 (44.3 overs)	v	South Africa Women XI; 165 (45 overs)
Fargana Hoque 58 (82); Nobulumko Baneti 4/15 (6.3 overs)		Andrie Steyn 55 (77); Sultana Khatun 2/15 (8 overs)

Bangladesh won by 8 runs
Mangaung Oval, Bloemfontein
Umpires: Abongile Sodumo (SA) and Abdoellah Steenkamp (SA)

- Bangladesh won the toss and elected to bat.

== T20I series ==
=== 1st T20I ===
3 December 2023
14:00
Scorecard

Bangladesh; 149/2 (20 overs)	v	South Africa; 136/8 (20 overs)
Murshida Khatun 62* (59); Nondumiso Shangase 1/13 (1 over)		Anneke Bosch 67 (49); Shorna Akter 5/28 (4 overs)

Bangladesh won by 13 runs
Willowmoore Park, Benoni
Umpires: Lauren Agenbag (SA) and Abongile Sodumo (SA)
Player of the match: Shorna Akter (Ban)

- Bangladesh won the toss and elected to bat.
- Eliz-Mari Marx (SA) made her T20I debut.
- Shorna Akter (Ban) took her first five-wicket haul in T20Is.
- This was the first win for Bangladesh against South Africa in South Africa in women's T20Is.

=== 2nd T20I ===
6 December 2023
18:00 (N)
Scorecard

Bangladesh; 7/1 (1.2 overs)	v	South Africa
Shamima Sultana 3 (5); Nonkululeko Mlaba 1/5 (1 over)

No result
De Beers Diamond Oval, Kimberley
Umpires: Kerrin Klaaste (SA) and Abdoellah Steenkamp (SA)

- South Africa won the toss and elected to field.
- No further play was possible due to rain.

=== 3rd T20I ===
8 December 2023
18:00 (N)
Scorecard

Bangladesh; 94/6 (20 overs)	v	South Africa; 95/2 (15.2 overs)
Lata Mondal 42 (62); Ayanda Hlubi 2/15 (4 overs)		Laura Wolvaardt 49* (49); Shorifa Khatun 1/10 (2 overs)

South Africa won by 8 wickets
De Beers Diamond Oval, Kimberley
Umpires: Lauren Agenbag (SA) and Kerrin Klaaste (SA)
Player of the match: Ayanda Hlubi (SA)

- South Africa won the toss and elected to field.
- Ayanda Hlubi (SA) made her T20I debut.

== ODI series ==
=== 1st ODI ===
16 December 2023
14:00 (D/N)
Scorecard

Bangladesh; 250/3 (50 overs)	v	South Africa; 131 (36.3 overs)
Murshida Khatun 91* (100); Nonkululeko Mlaba 1/37 (10 overs)		Eliz-Mari Marx 35 (59); Nahida Akter 3/33 (8.3 overs)

Bangladesh won by 119 runs
Buffalo Park, East London
Umpires: Lauren Agenbag (SA) and Abdoellah Steenkamp (SA)
Player of the match: Murshida Khatun (Ban)

- South Africa won the toss and elected to field.
- Eliz-Mari Marx (SA) made her ODI debut.
- Bangladesh's batting total was their highest in women's ODIs (250).
- This was the biggest margin of win for Bangladesh in women's ODIs in terms of runs (119).
- This was the first win for Bangladesh against South Africa in South Africa in women's ODIs.
- Women's Championship points: Bangladesh 2, South Africa 0.

=== 2nd ODI ===
20 December 2023
14:00 (D/N)
Scorecard

Bangladesh; 222/4 (50 overs)	v	South Africa; 223/2 (45.1 overs)
Fargana Hoque 102 (167); Marizanne Kapp 2/21 (9 overs)		Anneke Bosch 65* (63); Fahima Khatun 1/14 (9 overs)

South Africa won by 8 wickets
JB Marks Oval, Potchefstroom
Umpires: Kerrin Klaaste (SA) and Abongile Sodumo (SA)
Player of the match: Anneke Bosch (SA)

- South Africa won the toss and elected to field.
- Women's Championship points: South Africa 2, Bangladesh 0.

=== 3rd ODI ===
23 December 2023
14:00 (D/N)
Scorecard

South Africa; 316/4 (50 overs)	v	Bangladesh; 100 (31.1 overs)
Laura Wolvaardt 126 (134); Rabeya Khan 2/49 (10 overs)		Ritu Moni 33 (67); Nadine de Klerk 3/10 (5.1 overs)

South Africa won by 216 runs
Willowmoore Park, Benoni
Umpires: Lauren Agenbag (SA) and Kerrin Klaaste (SA)
Player of the match: Tazmin Brits (SA)

- South Africa won the toss and elected to bat.
- Tazmin Brits (SA) scored her first century in ODIs.
- Tazmin Brits and Laura Wolvaardt's 243-runs partnership was South Africa highest for any wickets in women's ODIs.
- Women's Championship points: South Africa 2, Bangladesh 0.
