= Pakistan women's cricket team in Bangladesh in 2023–24 =

International cricket tour

	Bangladesh	Pakistan
- Dates: 25 October – 10 November 2023
Captains	Nigar Sultana	Nida Dar

One Day International series
- Results: Bangladesh won the 3-match series 2–1
Most runs	Fargana Hoque (110)	Sidra Ameen (113)
Most wickets	Nahida Akter (7)	Sadia Iqbal (6)
- Player of the series: Nahida Akter (Ban)

Twenty20 International series
- Results: Bangladesh won the 3-match series 2–1
Most runs	Sobhana Mostary (49); Shamima Sultana (49)	Bismah Maroof (98)
Most wickets	Nahida Akter (8)	Nashra Sandhu (3); Umm-e-Hani (3); Diana Baig (3); Sadia Iqbal (3)
- Player of the series: Nahida Akter (Ban)

The Pakistan women's cricket team toured Bangladesh in October and November 2023 to play three One Day International (ODI) and three Twenty20 International (T20I) matches. The ODI series formed part of the 2022–2025 ICC Women's Championship. Bangladesh won both series by a 2-1 margin.

== Squads ==
Bangladesh		Pakistan
ODIs	T20Is	ODIs & T20Is
Nigar Sultana (c, wk); Nahida Akter (vc); Marufa Akter; Shorna Akter; Sumaiya Akter; Disha Biswas; Fargana Hoque; Fahima Khatun; Murshida Khatun; Rabeya Khan; Sultana Khatun; Sanjida Akter Meghla; Ritu Moni; Sobhana Mostary; Nishita Akter Nishi; Shamima Sultana	Nigar Sultana (c, wk); Nahida Akter (vc); Marufa Akter; Shorna Akter; Sumaiya Akter; Rabeya Khan; Murshida Khatun; Shorifa Khatun; Sultana Khatun; Fahima Khatun; Sanjida Akter Meghla; Sobhana Mostary; Ritu Moni; Sanjida Akter Meghla; Nishita Akter Nishi; Shathi Rani; Fariha Trisna	Nida Dar (c); Muneeba Ali (wk); Najiha Alvi (wk); Sidra Ameen; Waheeda Akhtar; Diana Baig; Ghulam Fatima; Sadia Iqbal; Iram Javed; Bismah Maroof; Natalia Pervaiz; Aliya Riaz; Sadaf Shamas; Nashra Sandhu; Umm-e-Hani

== T20I series ==
=== 1st T20I ===
25 October 2023
16:30 (D/N)
Scorecard

Pakistan; 82 (19.4 overs)	v	Bangladesh; 86/5 (19.3 overs)
Bismah Maroof 20 (29); Nahida Akter 5/8 (3.4 overs)		Nigar Sultana 26* (28); Nashra Sandhu 1/16 (4 overs)

Bangladesh won by 5 wickets
Zohur Ahmed Chowdhury Stadium, Chittagong
Umpires: Tanvir Ahmed (Ban) and Ali Arman (Ban)
Player of the match: Nahida Akter (Ban)

- Bangladesh won the toss and elected to field.

=== 2nd T20I ===
27 October 2023
16:30 (D/N)
Scorecard

Bangladesh; 120/6 (20 overs)	v	Pakistan; 100/7 (20 overs)
Shorna Akter 27* (22); Diana Baig 2/34 (4 overs)		Bismah Maroof 30 (44); Nahida Akter 2/15 (4 overs)

Bangladesh won by 20 runs
Zohur Ahmed Chowdhury Stadium, Chittagong
Umpires: Tanvir Ahmed (Ban) and Moniruzzaman (Ban)
Player of the match: Shorna Akter (Ban)

- Pakistan won the toss and elected to field.
- Shorifa Khatun (Ban) made her T20I debut.

=== 3rd T20I ===
29 October 2023
16:30 (D/N)
Scorecard

Pakistan; 132/4 (20 overs)	v	Bangladesh; 101/9 (20 overs)
Muneeba Ali 61 (49); Fariha Trisna 2/20 (4 overs)		Shamima Sultana 26 (38); Sadia Iqbal 2/19 (4 overs)

Pakistan won by 31 runs
Zohur Ahmed Chowdhury Stadium, Chittagong
Umpires: Tanvir Ahmed (Ban) and Ali Arman (Ban)
Player of the match: Muneeba Ali (Pak)

- Bangladesh won the toss and elected to field.
- Sumaiya Akter (Ban), Najiha Alvi and Waheeda Akhtar (Pak) all made their T20I debut.

== ODI series ==
=== 1st ODI ===
4 November 2023
09:30
Scorecard

Bangladesh; 81 (31.5 overs)	v	Pakistan; 85/5 (24.5 overs)
Fahima Khatun 18 (37); Sadia Iqbal 4/13 (9 overs)		Nida Dar 35* (59); Nahida Akter 3/30 (8.5 overs)

Pakistan won by 5 wickets
Sher-e-Bangla National Cricket Stadium, Dhaka
Umpires: Morshed Ali Khan (Ban) and Masudur Rahman (Ban)
Player of the match: Nida Dar (Pak)

- Bangladesh won the toss and elected to bat.
- Najiha Alvi (Pak) made her ODI debut.
- Women's Championship points: Pakistan 2, Bangladesh 0.

=== 2nd ODI ===
7 November 2023
09:30
Scorecard

Bangladesh; 169/9 (50 overs)	v	Pakistan; 169 (49.5 overs)
Nigar Sultana 54 (104); Nashra Sandhu 2/27 (10 overs)		Nida Dar 27 (47); Rabeya Khan 3/29 (10 overs)

Match tied (Bangladesh won the Super Over)
Sher-e-Bangla National Cricket Stadium, Dhaka
Umpires: Muhammad Kamruzzaman (Ban) and Masudur Rahman (Ban)
Player of the match: Nigar Sultana (Ban)

- Bangladesh won the toss and elected to bat.
- Nishita Akter Nishi (Ban) made her ODI debut.
- Super over: Pakistan 7/2, Bangladesh 10/1
- Women's Championship points: Bangladesh 2, Pakistan 0.

=== 3rd ODI ===
10 November 2023
09:30
Scorecard

Pakistan; 166/9 (50 overs)	v	Bangladesh; 167/3 (45.4 overs)
Sidra Ameen 84* (143); Nahida Akter 3/26 (10 overs)		Fargana Hoque 62 (113); Nashra Sandhu 2/27 (10 overs)

Bangladesh won by 7 wickets
Sher-e-Bangla National Cricket Stadium, Dhaka
Umpires: Morshed Ali Khan (Ban) and Masudur Rahman (Ban)
Player of the match: Fargana Hoque (Ban)

- Pakistan won the toss and elected to bat.
- Women's Championship points: Bangladesh 2, Pakistan 0.
