= Bangladesh women's cricket team in Sri Lanka in 2023 =

International cricket tour

	Sri Lanka	Bangladesh
- Dates: 29 April – 12 May 2023
Captains	Chamari Athapaththu	Nigar Sultana

One Day International series
- Results: Sri Lanka won the 3-match series 1–0
Most runs	Chamari Athapaththu (111)	Nigar Sultana (37)
Most wickets	Oshadi Ranasinghe (5)	Nahida Akter (4)
- Player of the series: Chamari Athapaththu (SL)

Twenty20 International series
- Results: Sri Lanka won the 3-match series 2–1
Most runs	Harshitha Samarawickrama (125)	Nigar Sultana (113)
Most wickets	Udeshika Prabodhani (4); Inoka Ranaweera (4); Kawya Kavindi (4)	Fahima Khatun (5)
- Player of the series: Harshitha Samarawickrama (SL)

The Bangladesh women's cricket team toured Sri Lanka in April and May 2023 to play three One Day International (ODI) and three Twenty20 International (T20I) matches. The ODI series formed part of the 2022–2025 ICC Women's Championship. On 10 April 2023, Sri Lanka Cricket (SLC) announced the schedule for the tour.

After the rain-affected first ODI ended without a result, and the second ODI of the originally scheduled three-match ODI series was abandoned due to rain, the schedule for the series was adjusted to allow the second game to be rearranged. However, lack of approval from the International Cricket Council meant that the ODI series ended according to the original schedule, which Sri Lanka won 1–0. Sri Lanka also won the ensuing T20I series 2–1.

== Squads ==
Sri Lanka	Bangladesh
Chamari Athapaththu (c); Nilakshi de Silva; Kavisha Dilhari; Imesha Dulani; Vishmi Gunaratne; Hansima Karunaratne; Kawya Kavindi; Sugandika Kumari; Kaushini Nuthyangana (wk); Hasini Perera; Udeshika Prabodhani; Inoshi Priyadharshani; Oshadi Ranasinghe; Inoka Ranaweera; Harshitha Samarawickrama; Sathya Sandeepani; Anushka Sanjeewani (wk); Tharika Sewwandi; Rashmi Silva; Malsha Shehani; Prasadani Weerakkody (wk)	Nigar Sultana (c, wk); ~~Shorna Akter~~; Nahida Akter; Jahanara Alam; Disha Biswas; Fargana Hoque; Rubya Haider (wk); Rabeya Khan; Fahima Khatun; Murshida Khatun; Sultana Khatun; Sanjida Akter Meghla; Lata Mondal; Ritu Moni; Sobhana Mostary; Shamima Sultana (wk); Fariha Trisna

Rubya Haider replaced the injured Shorna Akter in Bangladesh's squad before the start of the T20I series.

== Tour match ==
At the start of the tour, Bangladesh played a 50-over warm-up match against a Sri Lanka Cricket President's XI.

27 April 2023
10:00
Scorecard

Bangladesh; 116 (38.1 overs)	v	Sri Lanka Cricket President's XI; 89 (33.4 overs)
Sultana Khatun 32 (60); Madushika Methtananda 2/17 (8 overs)		Umesha Thimashini 24 (32); Fahima Khatun 4/22 (7.4 overs)

Bangladesh won by 27 runs
Colombo Cricket Club Ground, Colombo
Umpires: Krishantha Rodrigo (SL) and Chaturan Sanjeewa (SL)

- Sri Lanka Cricket President's XI won the toss and elected to field.

== ODI series ==
=== 1st ODI ===
29 April 2023
10:00
Scorecard

Sri Lanka; 152/6 (36.4 overs)	v	Bangladesh
Chamari Athapaththu 47 (37); Nahida Akter 3/24 (7 overs)

No result
P. Sara Oval, Colombo
Umpires: Nimali Perera (SL) and Raveendra Wimalasiri (SL)

- Sri Lanka won the toss and elected to bat.
- No further play was possible due to rain.
- Imesha Dulani, Kawya Kavindi (SL) and Sultana Khatun (Ban) all made their ODI debuts.
- Women's Championship points: Sri Lanka 1, Bangladesh 1.

=== 2nd ODI ===
2 May 2023
10:00
Scorecard

Sri Lanka	v	Bangladesh

Match abandoned
P. Sara Oval, Colombo
Umpires: Lyndon Hannibal (SL) and Dedunu Silva (SL)

- No toss.
- No play was possible due to rain.
- Women's Championship points: Sri Lanka 1, Bangladesh 1.

=== 3rd ODI ===
4 May 2023
10:00
Scorecard

Sri Lanka; 186/5 (30 overs)	v	Bangladesh; 128 (29.5 overs)
Chamari Athapaththu 64 (60); Sultana Khatun 1/22 (6 overs)		Nigar Sultana 37 (51); Oshadi Ranasinghe 5/34 (6 overs)

Sri Lanka won by 58 runs
Singhalese Sports Club Cricket Ground, Colombo
Umpires: Lyndon Hannibal (SL) and Dedunu Silva (SL)
Player of the match: Oshadi Ranasinghe (SL)

- Sri Lanka won the toss and elected to bat.
- The match was reduced to 30 overs per side due to rain.
- Oshadi Ranasinghe (SL) took her first five-wicket haul in ODIs.
- Women's Championship points: Sri Lanka 2, Bangladesh 0.

== T20I series ==
=== 1st T20I ===
9 May 2023
10:00
Scorecard

Sri Lanka; 145/6 (20 overs)	v	Bangladesh; 146/4 (19.5 overs)
Harshitha Samarawickrama 45 (44); Fahima Khatun 2/20 (4 overs)		Nigar Sultana 75* (51); Udeshika Prabodhani 1/7 (3 overs)

Bangladesh won by 6 wickets
Singhalese Sports Club Cricket Ground, Colombo
Umpires: Ruchira Palliyaguruge (SL) and Nimali Perera (SL)
Player of the match: Nigar Sultana (Ban)

- Sri Lanka won the toss and elected to bat.
- Kawya Kavindi (SL), Rubya Haider and Sultana Khatun (Ban) all made their T20I debuts.

=== 2nd T20I ===
11 May 2023
10:00
Scorecard

Bangladesh; 100 (18.3 overs)	v	Sri Lanka; 101/3 (18.3 overs)
Sobhana Mostary 18 (21); Inoka Ranaweera 2/9 (3.3 overs)		Chamari Athapaththu 33 (27); Fahima Khatun 2/16 (4 overs)

Sri Lanka won by 7 wickets
Singhalese Sports Club Cricket Ground, Colombo
Umpires: Nimali Perera (SL) and Prageeth Rambukwella (SL)
Player of the match: Kavisha Dilhari (SL)

- Sri Lanka won the toss and decided to field.

=== 3rd T20I ===
12 May 2023
13:00
Scorecard

Sri Lanka; 158/3 (20 overs)	v	Bangladesh; 114/7 (20 overs)
Nilakshi de Silva 64* (39); Rabeya Khan 1/20 (4 overs)		Nigar Sultana 31 (33); Udeshika Prabodhani 2/17 (4 overs); Inoka Ranaweera 2/17 (4 overs)

Sri Lanka won by 44 runs
Singhalese Sports Club Cricket Ground, Colombo
Umpires: Prageeth Rambukwella (SL) and Dedunu Silva (SL)
Player of the match: Nilakshi de Silva (SL)

- Sri Lanka won the toss and elected to bat.
