= South Africa women's cricket team in Australia in 2023–24 =

International cricket tour

	Australia	South Africa
- Dates: 27 January – 18 February 2024
Captains	Alyssa Healy	Laura Wolvaardt

Test series
- Result: Australia won the 1-match series 1–0
Most runs	Annabel Sutherland (210)	Chloe Tryon (69)
Most wickets	Darcie Brown (7)	Masabata Klaas (3); Chloe Tryon (3)
- Player of the series: Beth Mooney (Aus)

One Day International series
- Results: Australia won the 3-match series 2–1
Most runs	Beth Mooney (134)	Marizanne Kapp (125)
Most wickets	Alana King (7)	Masabata Klaas (5)

Twenty20 International series
- Results: Australia won the 3-match series 2–1
Most runs	Beth Mooney (167)	Tazmin Brits (100)
Most wickets	Ash Gardner (3)	Masabata Klaas (3); Nadine de Klerk (3)

The South Africa women's cricket team toured Australia in January and February 2024 to play one Test, three One Day International (ODI) and three Twenty20 International (T20I) matches.

The Test match was the first ever Test match to be played between the teams. The ODI series formed part of 2022–2025 ICC Women's Championship. The T20I series formed part of both teams' preparation for the 2024 ICC Women's T20 World Cup tournament.

Going into the tour, South Africa had never beaten Australia in any format of women's international cricket. However, South Africa won the second T20I by 6 wickets, and defeated Australia for the first time in women's internationals.

== Squads ==
Australia			South Africa	
Test	ODIs	T20Is	Test	ODIs & T20Is
Alyssa Healy (c, wk); Darcie Brown; Ashleigh Gardner; Kim Garth; Jess Jonassen; Alana King; Phoebe Litchfield; Tahlia McGrath; Sophie Molineux; Beth Mooney (wk); Ellyse Perry; Megan Schutt; Annabel Sutherland; Georgia Wareham	Alyssa Healy (c, wk); Darcie Brown; Ashleigh Gardner; Kim Garth; Heather Graham; Jess Jonassen; Alana King; Phoebe Litchfield; Tahlia McGrath; Beth Mooney (wk); Ellyse Perry; Megan Schutt; Annabel Sutherland; Georgia Wareham	Alyssa Healy (c, wk); Darcie Brown; Ashleigh Gardner; Kim Garth; Heather Graham; Grace Harris; Jess Jonassen; Phoebe Litchfield; Tahlia McGrath; Beth Mooney (wk); Ellyse Perry; Megan Schutt; Annabel Sutherland; Georgia Wareham	Laura Wolvaardt (c); Anneke Bosch; Tazmin Brits; Nadine de Klerk; Mieke de Ridder (wk); Ayanda Hlubi; Sinalo Jafta (wk); Marizanne Kapp; Masabata Klaas; Suné Luus; Eliz-Mari Marx; Nonkululeko Mlaba; Chloe Tryon; Delmi Tucker	Laura Wolvaardt (c); Anneke Bosch; Tazmin Brits; Nadine de Klerk; Mieke de Ridder (wk); Ayanda Hlubi; Sinalo Jafta (wk); Marizanne Kapp; Ayabonga Khaka; Masabata Klaas; Suné Luus; Eliz-Mari Marx; Nonkululeko Mlaba; Chloe Tryon; Delmi Tucker

== Tour match ==
24 January 2024
13:45
Scorecard

South Africa; 7/149 (20 overs)	v	Governor General's XI; 6/150 (19.2 overs)
Nadine de Klerk 48* (24); Courtney Sippel 2/20 (3 overs)		Sophie Molineux 59 (41); Masabata Klaas 3/16 (4 overs)

Governor General's XI won by 4 wickets
North Sydney Oval, Sydney
Umpires: Claire Polosak (Aus) and Eloise Sheridan (Aus)
Player of the match: Sophie Molineux (GG XI)

- Governor General's XI won the toss and elected to field.

== T20I series ==
=== 1st T20I ===
27 January 2024
10:45
Scorecard

South Africa; 6/147 (20 overs)	v	Australia; 2/149 (19.1 overs)
Tazmin Brits 59* (54); Ellyse Perry 2/13 (3 overs)		Beth Mooney 72* (57); Nadine de Klerk 1/25 (4 overs); Marizanne Kapp 1/25 (4 overs)

Australia won by 8 wickets
Manuka Oval, Canberra
Umpires: Sue Redfern (Eng) and Eloise Sheridan (Aus)
Player of the match: Beth Mooney (Aus)

- Australia won the toss and elected to field.

=== 2nd T20I ===
28 January 2024
10:45
Scorecard

Australia; 6/142 (20 overs)	v	South Africa; 4/144 (19 overs)
Grace Harris 31* (18); Masabata Klaas 2/16 (3 overs)		Laura Wolvaardt 58* (53); Ashleigh Gardner 2/26 (4 overs)

South Africa won by 6 wickets
Manuka Oval, Canberra
Umpires: Claire Polosak (Aus) and Eloise Sheridan (Aus)
Player of the match: Laura Wolvaardt (SA)

- Australia won the toss and elected to bat.
- Ellyse Perry (Aus) played in her 150th T20I.
- This was South Africa's first win against Australia in women's T20Is.

=== 3rd T20I ===
30 January 2024
19:05 (N)
Scorecard

South Africa; 7/162 (20 overs)	v	Australia; 5/163 (19.2 overs)
Marizanne Kapp 75 (48); Tahlia McGrath 1/17 (2 overs)		Beth Mooney 82 (55); Masabata Klaas 1/13 (2 overs)

Australia won by 5 wickets
Bellerive Oval, Hobart
Umpires: Sue Redfern (Eng) and Eloise Sheridan (Aus)
Player of the match: Beth Mooney (Aus)

- Australia won the toss and elected to field.
- Marizanne Kapp (SA) played in her 100th T20I.

== ODI series ==
=== 1st ODI ===
3 February 2024
14:10 (D/N)
Scorecard

South Africa; 105 (31.3 overs)	v	Australia; 2/106 (19 overs)
Marizanne Kapp 50* (58); Alana King 3/19 (4.3 overs)		Beth Mooney 52* (34); Nadine de Klerk 1/19 (4 overs)

Australia won by 8 wickets
Adelaide Oval, Adelaide
Umpires: Claire Polosak (Aus) and Sue Redfern (Eng)
Player of the match: Kim Garth (Aus)

- Australia won the toss and elected to field.
- Megan Schutt (Aus) played in her 200th international cricket match across formats.
- Women's Championship points: Australia 2, South Africa 0.

=== 2nd ODI ===
7 February 2024
14:40 (D/N)
Scorecard

South Africa; 6/229 (45 overs)	v	Australia; 149 (29.3 overs)
Marizanne Kapp 75 (87); Ashleigh Gardner 2/31 (6 overs)		Kim Garth 42* (48); Marizanne Kapp 3/12 (5 overs)

South Africa won by 84 runs (DLS method)
North Sydney Oval, Sydney
Umpires: Claire Polosak (Aus) and Eloise Sheridan (Aus)
Player of the match: Marizanne Kapp (SA)

- Australia won the toss and elected to field.
- Australia were set a revised target of 234 runs in 45 overs due to rain.
- Ayanda Hlubi (SA) made her ODI debut.
- Ashleigh Gardner and Kim Garth (Aus) recorded the highest ninth-wicket partnership in women's ODIs (77), before it was surpassed by Beth Mooney and Alana King in 2025 (106).
- This was South Africa's first win against Australia in women's ODIs.
- Women's Championship points: South Africa 2, Australia 0.

=== 3rd ODI ===
10 February 2024
14:40 (D/N)
Scorecard

Australia; 9/277 (50 overs)	v	South Africa; 127 (24.3 overs)
Beth Mooney 82* (91); Masabata Klaas 4/56 (9 overs)		Suné Luus 34 (38); Alana King 4/26 (5 overs)

Australia won by 110 runs (DLS method)
North Sydney Oval, Sydney
Umpires: Sue Redfern (Eng) and Eloise Sheridan (Aus)
Player of the match: Tahlia McGrath (Aus)

- Australia won the toss and elected to bat.
- South Africa were set a revised target of 238 runs in 31 overs due to rain.
- Women's Championship points: Australia 2, South Africa 0.

== Only Test ==
15–17 February 2024
Scorecard

South Africa	v	Australia
76 (31.2 overs); Suné Luus 26 (45); Darcie Brown 5/21 (9.2 overs)		9/575d (125.2 overs); Annabel Sutherland 210 (256); Chloe Tryon 3/81 (21.2 overs)
215 (97.2 overs); Chloe Tyron 64 (153); Annabel Sutherland 2/11 (8 overs)

Australia won by an innings and 284 runs
WACA Ground, Perth
Umpires: Claire Polosak (Aus) and Eloise Sheridan (Aus)
Player of the match: Annabel Sutherland (Aus)

- Australia won the toss and elected to field.
- Tazmin Brits, Ayanda Hlubi, Masabata Klaas and Delmi Tucker (SA) all made their Test debuts.
- Annabel Sutherland (Aus) scored her first double century in Tests.
