= 2023 ICC World Cup =

The 2023 ICC World Cup may refer to:

- 2023 Cricket World Cup, an ODI cricket tournament in India
- 2023 ICC Women's T20 World Cup, a T20 cricket tournament in South Africa
