= List of Bangladesh women ODI cricketers =

Since Bangladesh women's first Women's One Day International (WODI) in 2011, 41 players have represented the team. A WODI is an international cricket match between two representative teams, each having WODI status, as determined by the International Cricket Council (ICC). A WODI differs from Test matches in that the number of overs per team is limited, and each team has only one innings. The list is arranged in the order in which each player won her first ODI cap. Where more than one player won her first ODI cap in the same match, their surnames are listed alphabetically.

== Key ==
General

- ‡ – Captain
- † – Wicket-keeper
- First – Year of debut
- Last – Year of latest game
- Mat – Number of matches played

Batting

- Runs – Runs scored in career
- HS – Highest score
- 50 – Half centuries scored
- 100 – Centuries scored
- Avg – Runs scored per dismissal
- * – Batsman remained not out

Bowling

- Balls – Balls bowled in career
- Wkt – Wickets taken in career
- BBI – Best bowling in an innings
- Ave – Average runs per wicket

Fielding

- Ca – Catches taken
- St – Stumpings taken

== Players ==
Statistics are correct as on 25 April 2026.

Cap	Name	First	Last	Mat	Batting					Bowling					Fielding		Ref(s)
Cap	Name	First	Last	Mat	Runs	HS	50	100	Avg	Balls	Wkt	BBI	Ave	5WI	Ca	St	Ref(s)
1	Fargana Hoque	2011	2026	81	1,939	107	15	2	26.56	–	–	–	–	–	17	0	
2	Jahanara Alam ‡	2011	2023	52	185	23	0	0	7.40	2,054	48	3/18	30.39	0	9	0	
3	Khadija Tul Kubra	2011	2021	31	44	7	0	0	5.50	1,447	42	6/20	19.85	1	8	0	
4	Lata Mondal	2011	2023	35	463	52	1	0	17.14	589	14	4/35	28.07	0	12	0	
5	Panna Ghosh	2011	2019	28	133	23	0	0	8.86	954	15	2/9	43.00	0	5	0	
6	Rumana Ahmed ‡	2011	2022	50	963	75	5	0	22.92	2,068	50	4/20	25.46	0	18	0	
7	Salma Khatun ‡	2011	2022	46	491	75*	1	0	14.44	1,974	52	3/6	22.69	0	11	0	
8	Sharmin Akhter	2011	2026	56	1452	96	11	0	27.39	–	–	–	–	–	5	0	
9	Shathira Jakir	2011	2013	2	1	1	0	0	0.50	22	0	–	–	–	0	0	
10	Ayasha Rahman	2011	2018	20	329	70	2	0	17.31	282	5	2/12	34.80	0	5	0	
11	Sultana Yesmin †	2011	2013	6	17	11	0	0	3.40	–	–	–	–	–	4	5	
12	Ritu Moni	2012	2026	57	641	67*	1	0	17.32	1150	22	3/36	39.81	0	5	0	
13	Tithy Sarkar	2012	2012	1	7	7	0	0	7.00	12	0	–	–	–	0	0	
14	Ayesha Akhter	2012	2013	3	12	8	0	0	4.00	–	–	–	–	–	0	0	
15	Nuzhat Tasnia †	2012	2021	13	63	26	0	0	9.00	–	–	–	–	–	9	4	
16	Tazia Akhter	2012	2013	4	11	7	0	0	2.75	48	1	1/18	30.00	0	3	0	
17	Fahima Khatun	2013	2026	55	401	46*	0	0	12.15	1,859	41	5/21	34.09	1	16	0	
18	Shahanaz Parvin	2013	2013	2	2	2	0	0	1.00	–	–	–	–	–	0	0	
19	Shohely Akhter	2013	2014	2	0	0	0	0	0.00	90	3	3/13	16.33	0	0	0	
20	Shaila Sharmin	2013	2017	9	81	22	0	0	13.50	90	1	1/11	79.00	0	4	0	
21	Sanjida Islam	2014	2019	16	174	35	0	0	11.60	6	0	–	–	–	5	0	
22	Shamima Sultana †	2014	2023	17	333	53	2	0	20.81	–	–	–	–	–	2	4	
23	Nahida Akter	2015	2026	63	253	25*	0	0	7.90	2,910	81	5/21	22.88	1	16	0	
24	Nigar Sultana ‡†	2015	2026	68	1585	101	9	1	27.80	–	–	–	–	–	35	26	
25	Sharmin Sultana	2017	2026	16	157	27	0	0	9.81	–	–	–	–	–	4	0	
26	Suraiya Azmin	2017	2018	3	0	0	0	0	0.00	44	2	1/18	28.50	0	1	0	
27	Murshida Khatun	2018	2025	32	535	91*	3	0	19.81	–	–	–	–	–	5	0	
28	Jannatul Ferdus	2018	2025	7	30	19	0	0	6.00	222	9	5/7	18.33	1	4	0	
29	Sobhana Mostary	2018	2026	33	556	74	3	0	26.47	127	2	1/12	69.00	0	7	0	
30	Fariha Trisna	2021	2025	8	1	1*	0	0	0.25	235	5	3/35	37.60	0	0	0	
31	Marufa Akter	2022	2026	35	64	15*	0	0	8.00	1207	29	4/29	32.00	0	8	0	
32	Rabeya Khan	2022	2026	33	165	43*	0	0	8.68	1544	34	3/29	29.94	0	8	0	
33	Dilara Akter	2022	2025	3	21	13	0	0	10.50	–	–	–	–	–	1	0	
34	Sultana Khatun	2023	2026	19	42	16	0	0	5.25	905	21	3/23	28.95	0	1	0	
35	Shorna Akter	2023	2026	28	298	51*	1	0	15.68	473	10	3/5	36.50	0	5	0	
36	Nishita Akter Nishi	2023	2025	7	13	5	0	0	6.50	294	5	1/26	41.40	0	2	0	
37	Sumaiya Akter	2024	2025	3	3	2	0	0	1.00	–	–	–	–	–	0	0	
38	Sanjida Akter Meghla	2025	2025	2	1	1	0	0	1.00	60	1	1/24	57.00	0	0	0	
39	Ishma Tanjim	2025	2025	3	24	14	0	0	8.00	–	–	–	–	–	0	0	
40	Rubya Haider	2025	2025	7	144	54*	1	0	24.00	–	–	–	–	–	0	0	
41	Juairiya Ferdous	2026	2026	2	7	5	0	0	3.50	–	–	–	–	–	2	0	

== See also ==
- List of Bangladesh women Twenty20 International cricketers
