= England women's cricket team in South Africa in 2024–25 =

International cricket tour

England cricket team in South Africa in 2024–25
	South Africa	England
- Dates: 24 November – 18 December 2024
Captains	Laura Wolvaardt (Note: Chloe Tryon captained South Africa in the 3rd T20I.)	Heather Knight

Test series
- Result: England won the 1-match series 1–0
Most runs	Marizanne Kapp (78)	Nat Sciver-Brunt (165)
Most wickets	Nonkululeko Mlaba (10)	Lauren Bell (8)

One Day International series
- Results: England won the 3-match series 2–1
Most runs	Laura Wolvaardt (155)	Tammy Beaumont (110)
Most wickets	Marizanne Kapp (7)	Charlie Dean (7)
- Player of the series: Charlie Dean (Eng)

Twenty20 International series
- Results: England won the 3-match series 3–0
Most runs	Nadine de Klerk (80)	Danni Wyatt-Hodge (142)
Most wickets	Nadine de Klerk (4)	Charlie Dean (6)
- Player of the series: Nat Sciver-Brunt (Eng)

The England women's cricket team toured South Africa in November and December 2024 to play the South Africa women's cricket team. The tour consisted of one Test, three One Day International (ODI) and three Twenty20 International (T20I) matches. The ODI series formed part of the 2022–2025 ICC Women's Championship. In May 2024, the Cricket South Africa (CSA) confirmed the fixtures for the tour, as a part of the 2024–25 home international season.

On 14 December, CSA announced that there was no DRS for the one-off Test match.

== Squads ==
South Africa			England		
Test	ODIs	T20Is	Test	ODIs	T20Is
Laura Wolvaardt (c); Anneke Bosch; Tazmin Brits; Nadine de Klerk; Annerie Dercksen; Mieke de Ridder (wk); Lara Goodall; Ayanda Hlubi; Sinalo Jafta (wk); Marizanne Kapp; Masabata Klaas; Suné Luus; Nonkululeko Mlaba; Tumi Sekhukhune; Chloe Tryon	Laura Wolvaardt (c); Anneke Bosch; Tazmin Brits; Nadine de Klerk; Annerie Dercksen; Mieke de Ridder (wk); Lara Goodall; Ayanda Hlubi; Sinalo Jafta (wk); Marizanne Kapp; Ayabonga Khaka; Masabata Klaas; Suné Luus; Nonkululeko Mlaba; Chloe Tryon	Laura Wolvaardt (c); Anneke Bosch; Tazmin Brits; Nadine de Klerk; Annerie Dercksen; Ayanda Hlubi; Sinalo Jafta (wk); Suné Luus; Eliz-Mari Marx; Nonkululeko Mlaba; Tumi Sekhukhune; Nondumiso Shangase; Chloe Tryon; Faye Tunnicliffe (wk)	Heather Knight (c); Tammy Beaumont (wk); Lauren Bell; Maia Bouchier; Kate Cross; Charlie Dean; Sophia Dunkley; Sophie Ecclestone; Lauren Filer; Amy Jones (wk); ~~Freya Kemp~~; Ryana MacDonald-Gay; Grace Potts; Nat Sciver-Brunt; Seren Smale (wk); Danni Wyatt-Hodge	Heather Knight (c); Tammy Beaumont (wk); Lauren Bell; Maia Bouchier; Alice Capsey; Kate Cross; Charlie Dean; Sophia Dunkley; Sophie Ecclestone; Lauren Filer; Sarah Glenn; Amy Jones (wk); ~~Freya Kemp~~; Nat Sciver-Brunt; Danni Wyatt-Hodge	Heather Knight (c); Lauren Bell; Maia Bouchier; Alice Capsey; Charlie Dean; Sophia Dunkley; Sophie Ecclestone; Lauren Filer; Sarah Glenn; ~~Bess Heath (wk)~~; Amy Jones (wk); Freya Kemp; ~~Paige Scholfield~~; Nat Sciver-Brunt; Seren Smale (wk); Linsey Smith; Danni Wyatt-Hodge

England named uncapped Maia Bouchier and Freya Kemp in the Test squad. Alice Capsey was added to England's T20I squad on 18 November 2024, as a precaution due to minor injury concerns within the squad. On 20 November, Paige Scholfield was ruled out of the T20I series due to ankle injury. On 26 November, Seren Smale was drafted into the England T20I and Test squads after Bess Heath was ruled out due to a fractured thumb, while Ryana MacDonald-Gay was also added to the Test match squad. On 1 December, Freya Kemp was withdrawn from the England squad for the remainder of the tour to rest her before the 2025 Women's Ashes. On 13 December, England added uncapped Grace Potts to the Test squad.

== T20I series ==
=== 1st T20I ===
24 November 2024
14:00
Scorecard

South Africa; 142/5 (20 overs)	v	England; 143/6 (19.2 overs)
Annerie Dercksen 26 (29); Charlie Dean 2/21 (4 overs)		Nat Sciver-Brunt 59 (54); Eliz-Mari Marx 3/19 (3.2 overs)

England won by 4 wickets
Buffalo Park, East London
Umpires: Lauren Agenbag (SA) and Nimali Perera (SL)
Player of the match: Nat Sciver-Brunt (Eng)

- England won the toss and elected to field.

=== 2nd T20I ===
27 November 2024
18:00 (N)
Scorecard

England; 204/4 (20 overs)	v	South Africa; 168/6 (20 overs)
Danni Wyatt-Hodge 78 (45); Ayanda Hlubi 2/19 (2 overs)		Nadine de Klerk 32* (21); Sarah Glenn 4/20 (4 overs)

England won by 36 runs
Willowmoore Park, Benoni
Umpires: Siphelele Gasa (SA) and Kerrin Klaaste (SA)
Player of the match: Sarah Glenn (Eng)

- South Africa won the toss and elected to field.

=== 3rd T20I ===
30 November 2024
18:00 (N)
Scorecard

South Africa; 124 (20 overs)	v	England; 128/1 (11.3 overs)
Nondumiso Shangase 31 (35); Charlie Dean 3/26 (4 overs)		Danni Wyatt-Hodge 53* (31); Ayanda Hlubi 1/19 (2 overs)

England won by 9 wickets
Centurion Park, Centurion
Umpires: Siphelele Gasa (SA) and Nimali Perera (SA)
Player of the match: Charlie Dean (Eng)

- England won the toss and elected to field.

== ODI series ==
=== 1st ODI ===
4 December 2024
14:00 (D/N)
Scorecard

England; 186 (38.4 overs)	v	South Africa; 189/4 (38.2 overs)
Charlie Dean 47* (57); Annerie Dercksen 3/16 (5 overs)		Laura Wolvaardt 59* (114); Lauren Bell 1/30 (6 overs)

South Africa won by 6 wickets
De Beers Diamond Oval, Kimberley
Umpires: Lauren Agenbag (SA) and Nimali Perera (SL)
Player of the match: Marizanne Kapp (SA)

- England won the toss and elected to bat.
- Women's Championship points: South Africa 2, England 0.

=== 2nd ODI ===
8 December 2024
10:00
Scorecard

South Africa; 135 (31.3 overs)	v	England; 137/4 (24 overs)
Chloe Tryon 45 (49); Charlie Dean 4/45 (10 overs)		Maia Bouchier 33 (36); Annerie Dercksen 2/22 (4 overs)

England won by 6 wickets
Kingsmead Cricket Ground, Durban
Umpires: Siphelele Gasa (SA) and Kerrin Klaaste (SA)
Player of the match: Charlie Dean (Eng)

- England won the toss and elected to field.
- Charlie Dean became the third English woman cricketer to take hat-trick in ODIs.
- Women's Championship points: England 2, South Africa 0.

=== 3rd ODI ===
11 December 2024
14:00 (D/N)
Scorecard

South Africa; 233/8 (50 overs)	v	England; 153/4 (19 overs)
Laura Wolvaardt 61 (68); Sophie Ecclestone 2/26 (10 overs)		Tammy Beaumont 65* (46); Marizanne Kapp 3/24 (5 overs)

England won by 6 wickets (DLS method)
JB Marks Oval, Potchefstroom
Umpires: Siphelele Gasa (SA) and Nimali Perera (SL)
Player of the match: Tammy Beaumont (Eng)

- England won the toss and elected to field.
- England were set a revised target of 152 runs in 23 overs due to rain.
- Women's Championship points: England 2, South Africa 0.

== Only Test ==
15–18 December 2024
Scorecard

England	v	South Africa
395/9d (92 overs); Nat Sciver-Brunt 128 (145); Nonkululeko Mlaba 4/90 (20 overs)		281 (88.4 overs); Laura Wolvaardt 65 (147); Lauren Bell 4/49 (13 overs)
236 (74.1 overs); Heather Knight 90 (191); Nonkululeko Mlaba 6/67 (26 overs)		64 (19.4 overs); Marizanne Kapp 21 (28); Lauren Bell 4/27 (9 overs)

England won by 287 runs
Mangaung Oval, Bloemfontein
Umpires: Lauren Agenbag (SA) and Kerrin Klaaste (SA)
Player of the match: Lauren Bell (Eng)

- England won the toss and elected to bat.
- Maia Bouchier and Ryana MacDonald-Gay (Eng) both made their Test debuts.
- This was the first Women's Test match to be played at this venue.
- Maia Bouchier (Eng) scored her first century in Tests.
- Nat Sciver-Brunt (Eng) scored the fastest century in Tests in terms of number of balls (96).
- Nonkululeko Mlaba (SA) took her first five-wicket haul and ten-wicket haul in Tests.
- South Africa's second innings total was their lowest in Women's Tests, succeeding the 76 scored against Australia in February, and the shortest-ever innings a team has been bowled out for in the format.
