= Sumaiya Akter =

Bangladeshi cricketer

Personal information
- Full name: Sumaiya Akter
- Born: 15 October 2005 (age 21); Mymensingh, Bangladesh
- Batting: Right-handed
- Bowling: Right-arm offbreak
- Role: All-rounder

International information
- National side: Bangladesh (2023–present)
- ODI debut (cap 37): 27 March 2024 v Australia
- Last ODI: 26 October 2025 v India
- ODI shirt no.: 5
- Only T20I (cap 41): 29 October 2023 v Pakistan

Domestic team information
- Years: Team
- 2017–2022: Mymensingh Division
Medal record
Women's Cricket
Representing Bangladesh
Under-19 Women’s T20 Asia Cup
Runner-up	2024 Malaysia
- Source: Cricinfo, 31 March 2024

Sumaiya Akter (born 15 October 2005) is a Bangladeshi cricketer who plays for the Bangladesh women's national cricket team as a right-arm off-break bowler and right-hand batter.

In December 2022, she was selected to the Bangladesh women's under-19 cricket team for the 2023 Under-19 Women's T20 World Cup. She scored 65 runs at an average of 21.66 and scored 31* against the Australia women's under-19 team in that tournament.

== International career ==
In October 2023, Sumaiya earned her maiden call-up for the national team's ODI and T20I squads for the series against Pakistan. She made her Twenty20 International (T20I) debut against Pakistan on 29 October 2023. In November 2023, she was named in the Bangladesh ODI and T20I squads for their series against South Africa.

In March 2024, she was again selected to the national team for the ODI and T20I series against Australia. She made her One Day International (ODI) debut against Australia on 27 March 2024.
