= Ayanda Hlubi =

South African cricketer (born 2004)

Personal information
- Full name: Ayanda Hlubi
- Born: 16 July 2004 (age 22); KwaDukuza, KwaZulu-Natal, South Africa
- Batting: Right-handed
- Bowling: Right-arm medium
- Role: Bowler

International information
- National side: South Africa
- Test debut (cap 68): 15 February 2024 v Australia
- Last Test: 15 December 2024 v England
- ODI debut (cap 90): 7 February 2024 v Australia
- Last ODI: 10 February 2024 v Australia
- T20I debut (cap 61): 8 December 2023 v Bangladesh
- Last T20I: 27 November 2024 v England
- T20I shirt no.: 17

Domestic team information
- Years: Team
- 2019/20–present: KwaZulu-Natal Coastal

Career statistics
Competition	WTest	WODI	WT20I
Matches	1	2	4
Runs scored	5	4	–
Batting average	2.50	4.09	–
100s/50s	0/0	0/0	–
Top score	5	4	–
Balls bowled	102	72	72
Wickets	0	2	4
Bowling average	–	41.00	26.00
5 wickets in innings	–	0	0
10 wickets in match	–	0	0
Best bowling	–	2/41	2/15
Catches/stumpings	4/–	0/–	1/–
Medal record
Representing South Africa
Women's Cricket
T20 World Cup
Runner-up	2024 UAE
- Source: ESPNcricinfo, 28 November 2024

Ayanda Hlubi (born 16 July 2004) is a South African cricketer who currently plays for KwaZulu-Natal Coastal. She plays as a right-arm medium bowler.

She made her international debut in December 2023, in a Twenty20 International for South Africa against Bangladesh.

== Domestic career ==
Hlubi made her debut for KwaZulu-Natal Coastal in October 2019, against Free State, bowling three overs. In November 2023, she took 4/50 from her 10 overs in a match against Free State.

== International career ==
In December 2022, Hlubi was selected in the South Africa Under-19 squad for the 2023 ICC Under-19 Women's T20 World Cup. She played four matches at the tournament, taking three wickets at an average of 24.00.

In November 2023, Hlubi was named in the South Africa Emerging squad to play Zimbabwe. Later that same month, Hlubi earned her first call-up to the South Africa squad for the side's series against Bangladesh. She made her international debut in the third match of the Twenty20 International series, taking 2/15 from her four overs and subsequently being named Player of the Match.

She was named in the South Africa squad for the 2024 ICC Women's T20 World Cup and for their multi-format home series against England in November 2024.
