= Eliz-Mari Marx =

South African cricketer (born 2003)

Personal information
- Full name: Eliz-Mari Marx
- Born: 20 January 2003 (age 23); Pretoria, South Africa
- Batting: Right-handed
- Bowling: Right-arm medium
- Role: All-rounder

International information
- National side: South Africa
- ODI debut (cap 89): 16 December 2023 v Bangladesh
- Last ODI: 17 April 2024 v Sri Lanka
- T20I debut (cap 60): 3 December 2023 v Bangladesh
- Last T20I: 27 November 2024 v England

Domestic team information
- Years: Team
- 2016/17–present: Northerns

Career statistics
Competition	ODI	T20I	T20
Matches	7	9	37
Runs scored	53	13	319
Batting average	53.09	4.33	16.78
100s/50s	0/0	0/0	0/0
Top score	35	7	46
Balls bowled	240	134	617
Wickets	6	5	32
Bowling average	36.50	35.40	18.15
5 wickets in innings	0	0	0
10 wickets in match	0	0	0
Best bowling	2/22	3/19	4/7
Catches/stumpings	1/–	0/–	13/–
- Source: CricketArchive, 28 November 2024

Eliz-Mari Marx (born 20 January 2003) is a South African cricketer who currently plays for Northerns. She plays as a right-arm medium bowler and right-handed batter.

She made her international debut in December 2023, in a Twenty20 International for South Africa against Bangladesh.

== Early life ==
Marx was born on 20 January 2003 in Pretoria.

== Domestic career ==
Marx made her debut for Northerns in October 2016, against Easterns, in which she took 1/22 from her four overs. She was named Northerns Player of the Year at the end of the 2019–20 season, with 23 wickets and 223 runs. She scored her maiden List A century in October 2023, with 155 from 66 deliveries for Northerns against South Western Districts.

She has also played for Coronations and Thistles in the Women's T20 Super League.

== International career ==
In November 2023, Marx was named in the South Africa Emerging squad to play Zimbabwe. Later that same month, Marx earned her first call-up to the South Africa squad for the side's series against Bangladesh. She made her international debut in the first match of the Twenty20 International series, taking 1/25 from her four overs.

Marx was in the South Africa squad for the T20 part of their multi-format home series against England in November 2024.
