= List of Bangladesh women Twenty20 International cricketers =

This is a list of Bangladeshi women Twenty20 International cricketers. Overall, 45 players have represented the Bangladesh national women's cricket team in Twenty20 International (T20I) cricket starting from their inaugural match in 2012. A Twenty20 International is an international cricket match between two representative teams, each having Twenty20 International status, as determined by the International Cricket Council (ICC). A T20I match is played under the rules of Twenty20 cricket. This list includes names of all players who have played at least one T20I match for Bangladesh Women and is initially arranged in the order of debut appearance. Where more than one player won their first cap in the same match, those players are initially listed alphabetically at the time of debut.

== Key ==
General

- ‡ – Captain
- † – Wicket-keeper
- First – Year of debut
- Last – Year of latest game
- Mat – Number of matches played

Batting

- Runs – Runs scored in career
- HS – Highest score
- Avg – Runs scored per dismissal
- 50 – Number of half centuries
- 100 – Centuries scored
- * – Batsman remained not out

Bowling

- Wkt – Wickets taken in career
- BBI – Best bowling in an innings
- Ave – Average runs per wicket

Fielding

- Ca – Catches taken
- St – Stumpings affected

== List of players ==
Statistics are correct as of 22 September 2026.

Bangladesh WT20I cricketers
General					Batting					Bowling				Fielding		Ref
No.	Name	First	Last	Mat	Runs	HS	50	100	Avg	Balls	Wkt	BBI	Ave	Ca	St	Ref
1	Fargana Hoque	2012	2023	84	1,253	110*	3	1	18.70	–	–	–	–	21	0	
2	Jahanara Alam ‡	2012	2024	83	169	18*	0	0	6.25	1,520	60	5/28	24.03	13	0	
3	Khadija Tul Kubra	2012	2020	49	19	5	0	0	3.16	902	43	3/5	18.46	6	0	
4	Lata Mondal	2012	2025	53	388	42	0	0	11.41	270	5	1/12	67.20	27	0	
5	Nuzhat Tasnia †	2012	2014	18	45	11	0	0	7.50	–	–	–	–	3	15	
6	Ritu Moni	2012	2026	97	570	39*	0	0	10.36	1065	51	4/12	21.01	14	0	
7	Rumana Ahmed ‡	2012	2024	87	866	50	1	0	13.12	1,562	75	3/2	19.01	12	0	
8	Salma Khatun ‡	2012	2023	95	634	49*	0	0	15.46	1,866	84	4/6	18.57	18	0	
9	Sanjida Islam	2012	2020	54	520	71*	0	0	11.30	–	–	–	–	8	0	
10	Sharmin Akhter	2012	2026	42	732	63	2	0	20.33	–	–	–	–	4	0	
11	Ayasha Rahman	2012	2020	61	804	46	0	0	14.10	156	5	3/4	30.60	13	0	
12	Tazia Akhter	2012	2013	4	4	3	0	0	1.33	–	–	–	–	0	0	
13	Tithy Sarkar	2012	2012	7	7	7*	0	0	–	12	0	–	–	0	0	
14	Lily Rani Biswas	2012	2013	4	0	0*	0	0	0.00	48	2	2/18	24.50	0	0	
15	Panna Ghosh	2012	2020	40	92	14*	0	0	10.22	657	33	5/16	17.69	6	0	
16	Shahanaz Parvin	2013	2013	2	28	15	0	0	14.00	–	–	–	–	1	0	
17	Shohely Akhter	2013	2022	13	6	3*	0	0	6.00	198	8	4/7	23.87	0	0	
18	Ayesha Akhter	2013	2013	1	12	12	0	0	12.00	–	–	–	–	0	0	
19	Fahima Khatun	2013	2026	105	449	32*	0	0	9.35	1,638	69	4/8	22.86	35	0	
20	Sultana Yesmin †	2013	2013	1	–	–	–	–	–	–	–	–	–	0	0	
21	Shaila Sharmin	2013	2019	16	79	25*	0	0	8.77	78	3	2/9	21.00	4	0	
22	Shathira Jakir	2013	2013	1	–	–	–	–	–	–	–	–	–	0	0	
23	Shamima Sultana †	2014	2023	65	864	51	2	0	14.16	–	–	–	–	19	18	
24	Nahida Akter	2015	2026	113	178	16*	0	0	7.12	2,326	132	5/8	17.38	24	0	
25	Nigar Sultana ‡†	2015	2026	134	2,743	113*	13	1	27.15	–	–	–	–	31	52	
26	Jannatul Ferdus	2018	2024	4	3	2	0	0	1.50	66	3	1/19	29.33	0	0	
27	Murshida Khatun	2018	2025	52	947	80	6	0	21.04	–	–	–	–	9	0	
28	Sobhana Mostary	2019	2026	72	1160	59	1	0	19.33	48	2	1/12	36.50	20	0	
29	Sanjida Akter Meghla	2019	2026	33	4	2*	0	0	2.00	677	34	4/14	18.76	8	0	
30	Rabeya Khan	2019	2026	59	151	14*	0	0	7.94	1168	57	4/8	19.12	18	0	
31	Puja Chakraborty	2019	2019	1	–	–	–	–	–	12	1	1/1	1.00	0	0	
32	Suraiya Azmin	2022	2022	4	–	–	–	–	–	66	6	2/7	6.00	1	0	
33	Fariha Trisna	2022	2026	23	5	2*	0	0	2.50	438	18	4/19	22.70	7	0	
34	Dilara Akter	2022	2026	47	752	51	1	0	16.00	–	–	–	–	14	9	
35	Marufa Akter	2022	2026	52	18	5	0	0	2.57	967	45	3/23	23.55	11	0	
36	Shorna Akter	2023	2026	60	674	60	1	0	16.04	459	25	5/28	21.84	28	0	
37	Rubya Haider	2023	2024	6	58	20	0	0	9.66	–	–	–	–	0	0	
38	Sultana Khatun	2023	2026	25	58	12*	0	0	8.28	479	22	3/8	24.27	1	0	
39	Shathi Rani	2023	2024	9	114	29	0	0	12.66	–	–	–	–	1	0	
40	Shorifa Khatun	2023	2024	12	67	28*	0	0	13.40	162	3	1/10	70.00	0	0	
41	Sumaiya Akter	2023	2023	1	04	4	0	0	4.00	–	–	–	–	0	0	
42	Habiba Islam	2024	2024	1	–	–	–	–	–	12	0	–	–	0	0	
43	Ishma Tanjim	2024	2024	4	24	16	0	0	8.00	–	–	–	–	0	0	
44	Sabikun Nahar	2024	2024	1	–	–	–	–	–	48	3	2/28	15.00	1	0	
45	Taj Nehar	2024	2026	10	49	19	0	0	5.44	–	–	–	–	2	0	
46	Juairiya Ferdous	2026	2026	25	384	56	2	0	15.36	–	–	–	–	3	1	
47	Sarmin Sultana	2026	2026	1	1	1*	0	0	–	–	–	–	–	0	0	
48	Farjana Easmin	2026	2026	1	–	–	–	–	–	6	0	–	–	0	0	

== See also ==
- List of Bangladesh women ODI cricketers
