= Nishita Akter Nishi =

Bangladeshi cricketer (born 2008)

Personal information
- Full name: Nishita Akter Nishi
- Born: 19 June 2008 (age 18); Khulna, Bangladesh
- Batting: Right-handed
- Bowling: Right-arm offbreak
- Role: Bowler

International information
- National side: Bangladesh (2023–present)
- ODI debut (cap 36): 7 November 2023 v Pakistan
- Last ODI: 10 November 2023 v Pakistan
- ODI shirt no.: 12

Domestic team information
- Years: Team
- 2022/23: Jamuna

Career statistics
Competition	WODI
Matches	2
Runs scored	2
Batting average	–
100s/50s	0/0
Top score	2*
Balls bowled	102
Wickets	2
Bowling average	27.50
5 wickets in innings	0
10 wickets in match	0
Best bowling	1/26
Catches/stumpings	0/–
Medal record
Women's Cricket
Representing Bangladesh
Under-19 Women’s T20 Asia Cup
Runner-up	2024 Malaysia
- Source: Cricinfo, 19 April 2024

Nishita Akter Nishi (born 19 June 2008) is a Bangladeshi cricketer who plays for the Bangladesh women's national cricket team as a right-arm off break bowler. She received training at Bangladesh Krira Shikkha Protishtan, and took 13 wickets in nine matches for the BKSP team in the 2021–22 Dhaka Premier Division Women's Cricket League.

== Domestic career ==
She made her first-class debut for Jamuna on 30 March 2023, against Padma in the 2022–23 Bangladesh Women's National Cricket League.

== International career ==
In December 2022, she was selected to the Bangladesh women's under-19 cricket team as a stand-by player for the 2023 Under-19 Women's T20 World Cup.

In October 2023, she earned her maiden call-up to the Bangladesh women's cricket team for their series against Pakistan. She made her One Day International (ODI) debut against Pakistan in the same series, on 7 November 2023.

In March 2024, she was selected to the national team for the ODI series against Australia. In April 2024, she was named as a reserve player in Bangladesh's T20I squad for their series against India.
