= Shorifa Khatun =

Bangladeshi cricketer

Personal information
- Full name: Shorifa Khatun
- Born: 15 June 1993 (age 33)
- Batting: Right-handed
- Bowling: Right-arm off-break

International information
- National side: Bangladesh
- T20I debut (cap 40): 27 October 2023 v Pakistan
- Last T20I: 9 May 2024 v India

Domestic team information
- Years: Team
- 2012/13: Dhaka Division
- 2017–2022: Khulna Division
- 2023: Padma

Career statistics
Competition	WT20I	WLA	WT20
Matches	11	12	11
Runs scored	62	66	70
Batting average	15.50	7.33	17.50
100s/50s	0/0	0/0	0/0
Top score	28*	23	28*
Balls bowled	150	240	204
Wickets	3	2	9
Bowling average	68.00	78.50	18.11
5 wickets in innings	0	0	0
10 wickets in match	0	0	0
Best bowling	1/10	1/21	2/9
Catches/stumpings	0/–	2/–	1/–
- Source: CricketArchive, 28 March 2024

Shorifa Khatun (born 15 June 1993) is a Bangladeshi cricketer who plays for the Bangladesh women's national cricket team as a right-arm offbreak bowler and right-hand batter.

== International career ==
In October 2023, she earned her maiden call-up for the Bangladesh's T20I squad for the series against Pakistan. She made her Twenty20 International (T20I) debut against Pakistan on 27 October 2023.

She was again selected in the national T20I squad for their series against South Africa in November 2023, and the series against Australia in March 2024.
