= Disha Biswas =

Bangladeshi cricketer (born 2004)

Personal information
- Born: 3 April 2004 (age 22); Magura, Bangladesh
- Batting: Right-handed
- Bowling: Right-arm medium fast
- Role: All-rounder

Domestic team information
- Years: Team
- 2017–18: Chittagong Division
- 2022: Barisal Division
- 2023: Padma

Career statistics
Competition	FC	LA	T20
Matches	2	9	13
Runs scored	30	27	52
Batting average	15.00	3.83	6.50
100s/50s	0/0	0/0	0/0
Top score	26	12	19*
Balls bowled	150	306	168
Wickets	0	10	9
Bowling average	–	21.70	16.44
5 wickets in innings	–	0	0
10 wickets in match	–	0	0
Best bowling	–	4/28	3/16
Catches/stumpings	2/–	3/–	2/–
Medal record
Women's Cricket
Representing Bangladesh
Asian Games
Bronze medal – third place	2022 Hangzhou	Team
- Source: Cricinfo, 16 March 2024

Disha Biswas (Bengali: দিশা বিশ্বাস; born 3 April 2004) is a Bangladeshi cricketer. She was part of the team that won a bronze medal at the 2022 Asian Games. She captained the Bangladesh women's under-19 cricket team at the 2023 Under-19 Women's T20 World Cup held in South Africa in January 2023.

== Career ==
Biswas captained the Bangladeshi team at the 2023 Under-19 Women's T20 World Cup. In January 2023 she was named in Bangladesh's T20I squad for the 2023 ICC Women's T20 World Cup. In April 2023, she earned her maiden call-up for the national squad for the ODI and T20I series against Sri Lanka. In July 2023, She was also named in the squad for the series against India, but did not make her WODI or WT20I debut. Latter she also named in the national squad for the series against Pakistan and South Africa, but fails to debut for national team.

In September 2024, she was named in Bangladesh's squad for the 2024 ICC Women's T20 World Cup.
