= Mieke de Ridder =

South African cricketer (born 1996)

Personal information
- Full name: Mieke de Ridder
- Born: 19 January 1996 (age 30); Cradock, Eastern Cape, South Africa
- Batting: Right-handed
- Role: Wicket-keeper

International information
- National side: South Africa
- ODI debut (cap 92): 19 June 2024 v India
- Last ODI: 23 June 2024 v India
- T20I debut (cap 59): 4 September 2023 v Pakistan
- Last T20I: 3 December 2023 v Bangladesh
- T20I shirt no.: 19

Domestic team information
- Years: Team
- 2010/11–2021/22: Eastern Province
- 2022/23–present: South Western Districts

Career statistics
Competition	WT20I	WLA	WT20
Matches	2	71	33
Runs scored	1	1,085	396
Batting average	1.00	19.03	18.00
100s/50s	0/0	2/2	0/1
Top score	1	118	55
Catches/stumpings	0/0	33/23	16/15
Medal record
Representing South Africa
Women's Cricket
T20 World Cup
Runner-up	2024 UAE
- Source: Cricinfo, 15 February 2024

Mieke de Ridder (born 19 January 1996) is a South African cricketer who plays for South Western Districts. She plays as a wicket-keeper and right-handed batter. She has previously played for Eastern Province.

She made her international debut in September 2023, in a Twenty20 International for South Africa against Pakistan.

== Early and personal life ==
de Ridder was born on 19 January 1996 in Cradock, Eastern Cape. She has studied Architectural Technology.

== Domestic career ==
de Ridder made her debut for Eastern Province in January 2011, against South Western Districts, in which she scored 7* and made two dismissals. She scored her maiden List A century in February 2022, with 107* for Eastern Province against Kei. She made another century a month later, with 118 against Border.

de Ridder joined South Western Districts ahead of the 2022–23 season. She also played for Starlights in the 2022–23 Women's T20 Super League.

== International career ==
de Ridder earned her first call-up to the South Africa squad in August 2023 for the side's tour of Pakistan. She made her international debut in the third match of the Twenty20 International series, keeping wicket but not batting. She was named in South Africa's squad for their series against New Zealand later that year, but did not play a match. She was named in the South Africa squad for the 2024 ICC Women's T20 World Cup.

De Ridder was named in the South Africa squad for the ODI part of their multi-format home series against England in November 2024.
