= Darcie Brown =

Australian cricketer (born 2003)

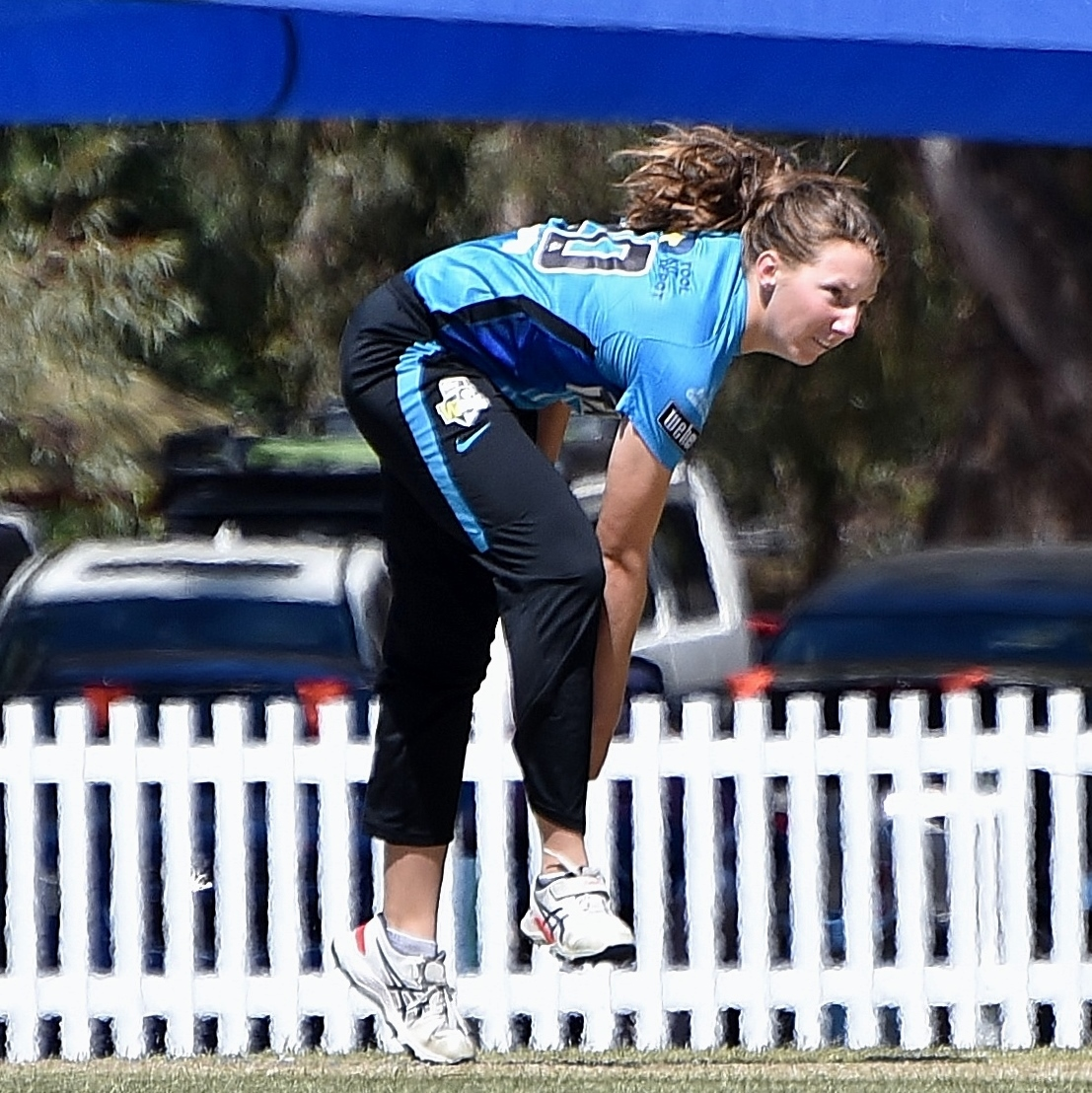
- Brown bowling for Adelaide Strikers during WBBL|08

Personal information
- Full name: Darcie Rose Brown
- Born: 7 March 2003 (age 23); Kapunda, South Australia, Australia
- Batting: Right-handed
- Bowling: Right-arm fast
- Role: Bowler

International information
- National side: Australia
- Test debut (cap 177): 30 September 2021 v India
- Last Test: 2 February 2025 v England
- ODI debut (cap 144): 10 April 2021 v New Zealand
- Last ODI: 17 January 2025 v England
- T20I debut (cap 54): 30 March 2021 v New Zealand
- Last T20I: 23 March 2025 v New Zealand
- T20I shirt no.: 5

Domestic team information
- Years: Team
- 2019/20–present: South Australia
- 2019/20–present: Adelaide Strikers

Career statistics
Competition	WTest	WODI	WT20I	WLA
Matches	4	19	30	31
Runs scored	13	–	6	52
Batting average	4.33	–	–	17.33
100s/50s	0/0	–	0/0	0/0
Top score	8	–	6*	19
Balls bowled	476	714	600	1,191
Wickets	10	23	28	32
Bowling average	28.20	25.30	22.96	31.00
5 wickets in innings	1	0	0	0
10 wickets in match	0	0	0	0
Best bowling	5/21	4/33	3/20	4/33
Catches/stumpings	2/–	6/–	13/–	14/–
Medal record
Women's Cricket
Representing Australia
Commonwealth Games
Gold medal – first place	2022 Birmingham
ICC Cricket World Cup
Winner	2022 New Zealand
ICC T20 World Cup
Winner	2023 South Africa
- Source: CricketArchive, 18 February 2024

Darcie Rose Brown (born 7 March 2003) is an Australian cricketer who plays as a fast bowler for the South Australian Scorpions in the Women's National Cricket League, and for the Adelaide Strikers in the Women's Big Bash League (WBBL). She made her international debut for the Australia women's cricket team in March 2021, and earned a contract with Cricket Australia the following month.

== Early life ==
Born and raised in Kapunda, a town in the Barossa Valley of South Australia, Brown is part of a sporting family. She, her two older brothers and her father have played A grade cricket together for the Kapunda team in the Barossa and Light competition, and she has also teamed up with her mother for the Northern Jets in the South Australia Cricket Association first grade women's district tournament.

By the time Brown had reached her mid-teens, she was already participating in high level basketball, cricket, netball and Australian rules football competitions, and also playing tennis. In 2018, she was part of the national title-winning South Australian schoolgirl's netball team, and was selected for an Australian schoolgirl's netball tour of New Zealand. In October 2018, she scored 117 off 84 balls in Adelaide Premier Cricket, contributing to what is believed to be a world record score in a 50 over match, 3/596. In January 2019, she told the Barossa Herald that "I just want to play as many sports as possible, for as long as I can." Her greatest challenge as a sportswoman was that she needed to wear glasses, which slip when she is bowling.

In early 2019, Brown was named in the Australia under-19 women's cricket squad, to compete in a four-match series against a New Zealand emerging players side in March 2019. She also moved to Adelaide to start her school year 11 on a netball scholarship with the Henley High School sports program.

== Career ==
A few weeks after returning from the March 2019 cricket tour of New Zealand, and after turning 16, Brown was awarded her first senior State contract, for the Scorpions. In October 2019, she signed for the Adelaide Strikers, becoming the youngest cricketer, male or female, to sign for the side. In announcing the signing, the Strikers commented that she was one of the fastest female bowlers in the State, clocking up speeds of up to 116 km/h (72 mph).

Brown made her debut for the Scorpions on 9 January 2020. She debuted for the Strikers on 25 October 2020, in the sixth edition of the WBBL, taking three wickets.

In February 2021, Brown was named in Australia's limited overs squad for their series against New Zealand. She made her Women's Twenty20 International (WT20I) debut for Australia on 30 March 2021, against New Zealand. She made her Women's One Day International (WODI) debut for Australia on 10 April 2021, also against New Zealand.

In August 2021, Brown was named in Australia's squad for their series against India, which included a one-off day/night Test match as part of the tour. Brown made her Test debut on 30 September 2021, for Australia against India.

In January 2022, Brown was named in Australia's squad for their series against England to contest the Women's Ashes. Later the same month, she was named in Australia's team for the 2022 Women's Cricket World Cup in New Zealand. Brown was named as the Betty Wilson Young Cricketer of the Year at the 2022 Australian Cricket Awards. In May 2022, Brown was named in Australia's team for the cricket tournament at the 2022 Commonwealth Games in Birmingham, England.

On 15 February 2024, Brown claimed first innings figures of 5/21 against South Africa to record her first international five-wicket haul.

She was named in the Australia squad for the 2024 ICC Women's T20 World Cup and the 2025 Women's Ashes series.
