= Shorna Akter =

Bangladeshi cricketer (born 2007)

Personal information
- Full name: Shorna Akter
- Born: 1 January 2007 (age 19); Jamalpur, Bangladesh
- Batting: Right-handed
- Bowling: Right-arm leg-break
- Role: All-rounder

International information
- National side: Bangladesh
- ODI debut (cap 35): 16 July 2023 v India
- Last ODI: 21 March 2024 v Australia
- T20I debut (cap 36): 12 February 2023 v Sri Lanka
- Last T20I: 8 December 2023 v South Africa
- T20I shirt no.: 11

Domestic team information
- Years: Team
- 2022: Chittagong Division
- 2022/23: Jamuna

Career statistics
Competition	ODI	T20I
Matches	10	21
Runs scored	54	204
Batting average	9.00	13.60
100s/50s	0/0	0/0
Top score	27*	31
Balls bowled	155	172
Wickets	2	12
Bowling average	65.50	18.08
5 wickets in innings	0	1
10 wickets in match	0	0
Best bowling	1/19	5/28
Catches/stumpings	1/–	5/–
Medal record
Representing Bangladesh
Women's Cricket
Asian Games
Bronze medal – third place	2022 Hangzhou	Team
- Source: CricketArchive, 21 March 2024

Shorna Akter (Bengali: স্বর্ণা আক্তার; born 1 January 2007) is a Bangladeshi cricketer who plays for the Bangladesh women's national cricket team as a right-arm leg-break bowler and right-hand batter.

== International career ==
In December 2022, she was selected to Bangladesh women's under-19 cricket team for the 2023 Under-19 Women's T20 World Cup. She scored 153 runs at the average of 51.00 and one half-century (50*) in that tournament. She was the only Bangladeshi player named in the ICC team of the tournament.

In January 2023 she was named in Bangladesh's T20I squad for the 2023 ICC Women's T20 World Cup. She made her Twenty20 International (T20I) debut against Sri Lanka on 12 January 2023 in the T20 World Cup. She scored 59 runs and took 2 wickets in that tournament.

In April 2023, she was named for the Bangladesh's T20I and ODI squad for the series against Sri Lanka. Later she was ruled out of the series due to injury. In July 2023, she was named in the ODI squad for the series against India. She made her One Day International (ODI) debut against India, on 16 July 2023. But she didn't come to bat due to appendicitis pain.

In August 2023, she was selected to the national team for the 2022 Asian Games. She was the part of Bronze medal winning team of Bangladesh in that tournament.

In October 2023, she played all round performances against Pakistan in T20I series and helping Bangladesh to win maiden T20I series over Pakistan. She took her maiden five-wicket haul (5/28 in her 4 overs) in T20Is on 3 December 2023, against South Africa when Bangladesh tour to South Africa.

She was named in the Bangladesh squad for the 2024 ICC Women's T20 World Cup.

Akter was part of the Bangladesh squad for the 2025 Women's Cricket World Cup Qualifier in Pakistan in April 2025.
