= Sharmin Sultana =

Sharmin Sultana may refer to:

- Sharmin Sultana (cricketer), a Bangladeshi cricketer
- Sharmin Sultana Shirin, a Bangladeshi chess player
- Sharmin Sultana Rima, a Bangladeshi kabaddi player
- Sharmin Sultana Sumi, a Bangladeshi singer
