= 2023 Women's T20 World Cup =

8th edition of the Women's T20 World Cup

- Dates: 10 – 26 February 2023
- Administrator: International Cricket Council
- Cricket format: Twenty20 International
- Tournament format(s): Group stage & knockout
- Host: South Africa
- Champions: Australia (6th title)
- Runners-up: South Africa
- Participants: 10
- Matches: 23
- Player of the series: (Australia) Ashleigh Gardner
- Most runs: (South Africa) Laura Wolvaardt (230)
- Most wickets: (England) Sophie Ecclestone (11)
- Official website: www.t20worldcup.com

The 2023 Women's T20 World Cup was the eighth edition of Women's T20 World Cup tournament. It was held in South Africa between 10 February and 26 February 2023. The final took place at Cape Town. Australia won their sixth and third consecutive title after beating the hosts South Africa in the final by 19 runs.

== Teams and qualification ==
In December 2020 the ICC confirmed the qualification process for the tournament. South Africa automatically qualified for the tournament as the hosts. They were joined by the seven highest ranked teams in the ICC Women's T20I Rankings, as of 30 November 2021, who competed at the 2020 Women's T20 World Cup in Australia. The remaining two teams were Ireland and Bangladesh, the finalists of the qualifying tournament.

Team	Qualification
South Africa	Host Nation
Australia	Automatic qualification
England	Automatic qualification
India	Automatic qualification
New Zealand	Automatic qualification
Pakistan	Automatic qualification
Sri Lanka	Automatic qualification
West Indies	Automatic qualification
Bangladesh	Via qualifying tournament
Ireland	Via qualifying tournament

== Squads ==
Each team selected a squad of 15 players before the tournament, and was able to replace any injured players. Pakistan were the first to name their squad on 14 December 2022.

== Venues ==
In August 2022, the ICC announced that three venues in three cities would host matches. The venues were Newlands Cricket Ground, St George's Park and Boland Park.

Venues of 2023 ICC World T20 in South Africa	Cape Town	Gqeberha	Paarl
Venues of 2023 ICC World T20 in South Africa	Newlands Cricket Ground	St George's Park	Boland Park
Venues of 2023 ICC World T20 in South Africa	Capacity: 25,000	Capacity: 19,000	Capacity: 10,000
Venues of 2023 ICC World T20 in South Africa	Matches: 12	Matches: 5	Matches: 6

== Match officials ==
On 27 January 2023, the ICC appointed the all-woman panel of match officials for the tournament. Along with the ten umpires, G. S. Lakshmi, Shandre Fritz and Michell Pereira were also named as the match referees.

Match Referees

- (South Africa) Shandre Fritz
- (India) G. S. Lakshmi
- (Sri Lanka) Michell Pereira

Umpires

- (South Africa) Lauren Agenbag
- (New Zealand) Kim Cotton
- (England) Anna Harris
- (India) Narayanan Janani
- (Sri Lanka) Nimali Perera
- (Australia) Claire Polosak
- (India) Vrinda Rathi
- (England) Sue Redfern
- (Australia) Eloise Sheridan
- (Cricket West Indies) Jacqueline Williams

== Prize money ==
The total prize money purse of US$2,450,000 was available for the tournament and was allocated according to the performance of the team as follows:

Prize money
Stage	Teams	Prize money (USD)	Total (USD)
Winner	1	$1,000,000	$1,000,000
Runner-up	1	$500,000	$500,000
Losing semi-finalists	2	$210,000	$420,000
Winner of each pool match	20	$17,500	$350,000
Teams that do not pass the group stage	6	$30,000	$180,000
Total	$2,450,000		

== Warm-up matches ==
Before the T20 World Cup, the participating nations competed in ten warm-up matches, which were played from 6 February to 8 February 2023. These matches did not have either Women's Twenty20 International (WT20I) status or WT20 status.

Warm-up matches

6 February 2023
10:00
Scorecard

New Zealand; 123/5 (20 overs)	v	West Indies; 91/7 (20 overs)
Maddy Green 47* (37); Hayley Matthews 1/6 (2 overs)		Shemaine Campbelle 26 (29); Amelia Kerr 3/20 (4 overs)

New Zealand won by 32 runs
Western Province Cricket Club, Cape Town
Umpires: Vrinda Rathi (Ind) and Eloise Sheridan (SA)

- West Indies won the toss and elected to field.

6 February 2023
10:00
Scorecard

Sri Lanka; 149/5 (20 overs)	v	Ireland; 147 (19.5 overs)
Harshitha Samarawickrama 56 (46); Laura Delany 3/20 (3 overs)		Gaby Lewis 38 (24); Oshadi Ranasinghe 3/22 (4 overs)

Sri Lanka won by 2 runs
Stellenbosh University 1, Western Cape
Umpires: Narayanan Janani (Ind) and Jacqueline Williams (WI)

- Ireland won the toss and elected to field.

6 February 2023
14:30
Scorecard

England; 246/7 (20 overs)	v	South Africa; 229/9 (20 overs)
Alice Capsey 61 (33); Nadine de Klerk 3/46 (4 overs)		Chloe Tryon 65 (23); Sarah Glenn 3/30 (4 overs)

England won by 17 runs
Stellenbosh University 1, Western Cape
Umpires: Kim Cotton (NZ) and Claire Polosak (Aus)

- South Africa won the toss and elected to field.

6 February 2023
14:30
Scorecard

Australia; 129/8 (20 overs)	v	India; 85 (15.1 overs)
Georgia Wareham 32* (17); Shikha Pandey 2/9 (3 overs)		Deepti Sharma 15 (18); Darcie Brown 4/17 (3.1 overs)

Australia won by 44 runs
Newlands Cricket Ground, Cape Town
Umpires: Lauren Agenbag (SA) and Anna Harris (Eng)

- Australia won the toss and elected to bat.

6 February 2023
14:30
Scorecard

Bangladesh; 103/7 (20 overs)	v	Pakistan; 105/4 (16 overs)
Shamima Sultana 36 (41); Nida Dar 2/12 (3 overs)		Nida Dar 24* (19); Rumana Ahmed 2/6 (2 overs)

Pakistan won by 6 wickets
Western Province Cricket Club, Cape Town
Umpires: Vrinda Rathi (Ind) and Sue Redfern (Eng)

- Bangladesh won the toss and elected to bat.

8 February 2023
10:00
Scorecard

Australia; 168/5 (20 overs)	v	Ireland; 169/7 (19.4 overs)
Alyssa Healy 62 (40); Orla Prendergast 2/19 (4 overs)		Laura Delany 32 (28); Megan Schutt 2/16 (4 overs)

Ireland won by 3 wickets
Stellenbosh University 1, Western Cape
Umpires: Narayanan Janani (Ind) and Jacqueline Williams (WI)

- Australia won the toss and elected to bat.

8 February 2023
10:00
Scorecard

New Zealand; 114/9 (20 overs)	v	England; 118/5 (13.5 overs)
Suzie Bates 36 (35); Sophie Ecclestone 3/19 (4 overs)		Sophia Dunkley 60* (38); Hayley Jensen 2/20 (3 overs)

England won by 5 wickets
Western Province Cricket Club, Cape Town
Umpires: Lauren Agenbag (SA) and Nimali Perera (SL)

- England won the toss and elected to field.

8 February 2023
14:30
Scorecard

Pakistan; 142/5 (20 overs)	v	South Africa; 143/4 (18.2 overs)
Aliya Riaz 48 (30); Ayabonga Khaka 2/23 (3 overs)		Laura Wolvaardt 65 (42); Aliya Riaz 2/24 (3 overs)

South Africa won by 6 wickets
Boland Park, Paarl
Umpires: Sue Redfern (Eng) and Eloise Sheridan (Aus)

- Pakistan won the toss and elected to bat.

8 February 2023
14:30
Scorecard

Sri Lanka; 107 (20 overs)	v	West Indies; 111/6 (19.4 overs)
Nilakshi de Silva 29 (26); Hayley Matthews 3/17 (4 overs)		Hayley Matthews 50 (48); Malsha Shehani 1/11 (2 overs)

West Indies won by 4 wickets
Western Province Cricket Club, Cape Town
Umpires: Nimali Perera (SL) and Claire Polosak (Aus)

- Sri Lanka won the toss and elected to bat.

8 February 2023
14:30
Scorecard

India; 183/5 (20 overs)	v	Bangladesh; 131/8 (20 overs)
Richa Ghosh 91 (56); Nahida Akter 2/24 (3 overs)		Nigar Sultana 40 (36); Devika Vaidya 2/21 (3 overs)

India won by 52 runs
Stellenbosh University 1, Western Cape
Umpires: Kim Cotton (NZ) and Anna Harris (Eng)

- India won the toss and elected to bat.

== Group stage ==
The ICC released the fixture details on 3 October 2022.

=== Group 1 ===
Pos	Team	Pld	W	L	T	NR	Pts	NRR
1	Australia	4	4	0	0	0	8	2.149
2	South Africa (H)	4	2	2	0	0	4	0.738
3	New Zealand	4	2	2	0	0	4	0.138
4	Sri Lanka	4	2	2	0	0	4	−1.460
5	Bangladesh	4	0	4	0	0	0	−1.529

Source: ESPNcricinfo
(H) Host

Advance to the knockout stage

10 February 2023
19:00 (N)
Scorecard

Sri Lanka; 129/4 (20 overs)	v	South Africa; 126/9 (20 overs)
Chamari Athapaththu 68 (50); Marizanne Kapp 1/15 (4 overs)		Suné Luus 28 (27); Inoka Ranaweera 3/18 (4 overs)

Sri Lanka won by 3 runs
Newlands Cricket Ground, Cape Town
Umpires: Kim Cotton (NZ) and Anna Harris (Eng)
Player of the match: Chamari Athapaththu (SL)

- South Africa won the toss and elected to field.

11 February 2023
19:00 (N)
Scorecard

Australia; 173/9 (20 overs)	v	New Zealand; 76 (14 overs)
Alyssa Healy 55 (38); Amelia Kerr 3/23 (4 overs)		Amelia Kerr 21 (30); Ashleigh Gardner 5/12 (3 overs)

Australia won by 97 runs
Boland Park, Paarl
Umpires: Nimali Perera (SL) and Sue Redfern (Eng)
Player of the match: Ashleigh Gardner (Aus)

- New Zealand won the toss and elected to field.

12 February 2023
19:00 (N)
Scorecard

Bangladesh; 126/8 (20 overs)	v	Sri Lanka; 129/3 (18.2 overs)
Sobhana Mostary 29 (32); Oshadi Ranasinghe 3/23 (4 overs)		Harshitha Samarawickrama 69* (50); Marufa Akter 3/23 (4 overs)

Sri Lanka won by 7 wickets
Newlands Cricket Ground, Cape Town
Umpires: Anna Harris (Eng) and Sue Redfern (Eng)
Player of the match: Harshitha Samarawickrama (SL)

- Bangladesh won the toss and elected to bat.
- Shorna Akter (Ban) made her WT20I debut.

13 February 2023
19:00 (N)
Scorecard

South Africa; 132/6 (20 overs)	v	New Zealand; 67 (18.1 overs)
Chloe Tryon 40 (34); Eden Carson 2/23 (4 overs)		Sophie Devine 16 (26); Nonkululeko Mlaba 3/10 (4 overs)

South Africa won by 65 runs
Boland Park, Paarl
Umpires: Narayanan Janani (Ind) and Eloise Sheridan (Aus)
Player of the match: Chloe Tryon (SA)

- South Africa won the toss and elected to bat.

14 February 2023
19:00 (N)
Scorecard

Bangladesh; 107/7 (20 overs)	v	Australia; 111/2 (18.2 overs)
Nigar Sultana 57 (50); Georgia Wareham 3/20 (4 overs)		Meg Lanning 48* (49); Shorna Akter 1/12 (2 overs)

Australia won by 8 wickets
St George's Park, Gqeberha
Umpires: Kim Cotton (NZ) and Jacqueline Williams (WI)
Player of the match: Georgia Wareham (Aus)

- Bangladesh won the toss and elected to bat.

16 February 2023
15:00
Scorecard

Sri Lanka; 112/8 (20 overs)	v	Australia; 113/0 (15.5 overs)
Harshitha Samarawickrama 34 (40); Megan Schutt 4/24 (4 overs)		Beth Mooney 56* (53)

Australia won by 10 wickets
St George's Park, Gqeberha
Umpires: Anna Harris (Eng) and Jacqueline Williams (WI)
Player of the match: Alyssa Healy (Aus)

- Australia won the toss and elected to field.

17 February 2023
15:00
Scorecard

New Zealand; 189/3 (20 overs)	v	Bangladesh; 118/8 (20 overs)
Suzie Bates 81* (61); Fahima Khatun 2/36 (4 overs)		Shorna Akter 31 (22); Eden Carson 3/18 (4 overs)

New Zealand won by 71 runs
Newlands Cricket Ground, Cape Town
Umpires: Lauren Agenbag (SA) and Narayanan Janani (Ind)
Player of the match: Suzie Bates (NZ)

- New Zealand won the toss and elected to bat.

18 February 2023
19:00 (N)
Scorecard

South Africa; 124/6 (20 overs)	v	Australia; 125/4 (16.3 overs)
Tazmin Brits 45 (36); Georgia Wareham 2/18 (3 overs)		Tahlia McGrath 57 (33); Marizanne Kapp 2/21 (4 overs)

Australia won by 6 wickets
St George's Park, Gqeberha
Umpires: Nimali Perera (SL) and Jacqueline Williams (WI)
Player of the match: Tahlia McGrath (Aus)

- Australia won the toss and elected to field.

19 February 2023
19:00 (N)
Scorecard

New Zealand; 162/3 (20 overs)	v	Sri Lanka; 60 (15.5 overs)
Amelia Kerr 66 (48); Inoka Ranaweera 1/27 (4 overs)		Chamari Athapaththu 19 (21); Amelia Kerr 2/7 (2.5 overs)

New Zealand won by 102 runs
Boland Park, Paarl
Umpires: Narayanan Janani (Ind) and Sue Redfern (Eng)
Player of the match: Amelia Kerr (NZ)

- New Zealand won the toss and elected to bat.

21 February 2023
19:00 (N)
Scorecard

Bangladesh; 113/6 (20 overs)	v	South Africa; 117/0 (17.5 overs)
Nigar Sultana 30 (34); Marizanne Kapp 2/17 (4 overs)		Laura Wolvaardt 66* (56)

South Africa won by 10 wickets
Newlands Cricket Ground, Cape Town
Umpires: Sue Redfern (Eng) and Eloise Sheridan (Aus)
Player of the match: Laura Wolvaardt (SA)

- Bangladesh won the toss and elected to bat.
- Suné Luus (SA) played in her 100th WT20I.

=== Group 2 ===
Pos	Team	Pld	W	L	T	NR	Pts	NRR
1	England	4	4	0	0	0	8	2.860
2	India	4	3	1	0	0	6	0.253
3	West Indies	4	2	2	0	0	4	−0.601
4	Pakistan	4	1	3	0	0	2	−0.703
5	Ireland	4	0	4	0	0	0	−1.814

Source: ESPNcricinfo

Advanced to the knockout stage

11 February 2023
15:00
Scorecard

West Indies; 135/7 (20 overs)	v	England; 138/3 (14.3 overs)
Hayley Matthews 42 (32); Sophie Ecclestone 3/23 (4 overs)		Nat Sciver-Brunt 40* (30); Chinelle Henry 2/30 (3.3 overs)

England won by 7 wickets
Boland Park, Paarl
Umpires: Claire Polosak (Aus) and Vrinda Rathi (Ind)
Player of the match: Nat Sciver-Brunt (Eng)

- West Indies won the toss and elected to bat.

12 February 2023
15:00
Scorecard

Pakistan; 149/4 (20 overs)	v	India; 151/3 (19 overs)
Bismah Maroof 68* (55); Radha Yadav 2/21 (4 overs)		Jemimah Rodrigues 53* (38); Nashra Sandhu 2/15 (4 overs)

India won by 7 wickets
Newlands Cricket Ground, Cape Town
Umpires: Lauren Agenbag (SA) and Jacqueline Williams (WI)
Player of the match: Jemimah Rodrigues (Ind)

- Pakistan won the toss and elected to bat.

13 February 2023
15:00
Scorecard

Ireland; 105 (18.2 overs)	v	England; 107/6 (14.2 overs)
Gaby Lewis 36 (37); Sophie Ecclestone 3/13 (4 overs)		Alice Capsey 51 (22); Cara Murray 3/15 (3 overs)

England won by 4 wickets
Boland Park, Paarl
Umpires: Nimali Perera (SL) and Claire Polosak (Aus)
Player of the match: Alice Capsey (Eng)

- Ireland won the toss and elected to bat.
- Alice Capsey (Eng) equalled the record for the fastest 50 in a Women's T20 World Cup match (21 balls).

15 February 2023
15:00
Scorecard

West Indies; 118/6 (20 overs)	v	India; 119/4 (18.1 overs)
Stafanie Taylor 42 (40); Deepti Sharma 3/15 (4 overs)		Richa Ghosh 44* (32); Karishma Ramharack 2/14 (4 overs)

India won by 6 wickets
Newlands Cricket Ground, Cape Town
Umpires: Nimali Perera (SL) and Eloise Sheridan (Aus)
Player of the match: Deepti Sharma (Ind)

- West Indies won the toss and elected to bat.
- Deepti Sharma became the first Indian bowler to take 100 wickets in WT20Is.

15 February 2023
19:00 (N)
Scorecard

Pakistan; 165/5 (20 overs)	v	Ireland; 95 (16.3 overs)
Muneeba Ali 102 (68); Arlene Kelly 2/27 (3 overs)		Orla Prendergast 31 (21); Nashra Sandhu 4/18 (4 overs)

Pakistan won by 70 runs
Newlands Cricket Ground, Cape Town
Umpires: Narayanan Janani (Ind) and Claire Polosak (Aus)
Player of the match: Muneeba Ali (Pak)

- Ireland won the toss and elected to field.
- Muneeba Ali became the first player for Pakistan to score a century in WT20Is.

17 February 2023
19:00 (N)
Scorecard

Ireland; 137/9 (20 overs)	v	West Indies; 140/4 (19.5 overs)
Orla Prendergast 61 (47); Shamilia Connell 3/24 (4 overs)		Hayley Matthews 66* (53); Leah Paul 1/26 (4 overs)

West Indies won by 6 wickets
Newlands Cricket Ground, Cape Town
Umpires: Vrinda Rathi (Ind) and Eloise Sheridan (Aus)
Player of the match: Hayley Matthews (WI)

- Ireland won the toss and elected to bat.

18 February 2023
15:00
Scorecard

England; 151/7 (20 overs)	v	India; 140/5 (20 overs)
Nat Sciver-Brunt 50 (42); Renuka Singh 5/15 (4 overs)		Smriti Mandhana 52 (41); Sarah Glenn 2/27 (4 overs)

England won by 11 runs
St George's Park, Gqeberha
Umpires: Kim Cotton (NZ) and Jacqueline Williams (WI)
Player of the match: Nat Sciver-Brunt (Eng)

- India won the toss and elected to field.

19 February 2023
15:00
Scorecard

West Indies; 116/6 (20 overs)	v	Pakistan; 113/5 (20 overs)
Rashada Williams 30 (34); Nida Dar 2/13 (4 overs)		Aliya Riaz 29 (23); Hayley Matthews 2/14 (4 overs)

West Indies won by 3 runs
Boland Park, Paarl
Umpires: Lauren Agenbag (SA) and Vrinda Rathi (Ind)
Player of the match: Hayley Matthews (WI)

- West Indies won the toss and elected to bat.

20 February 2023
15:00
Scorecard

India; 155/6 (20 overs)	v	Ireland; 54/2 (8.2 overs)
Smriti Mandhana 87 (56); Laura Delany 3/33 (4 overs)		Gaby Lewis 32* (25); Renuka Singh 1/10 (2 overs)

India won by 5 runs (DLS method)
St George's Park, Gqeberha
Umpires: Kim Cotton (NZ) and Anna Harris (Eng)
Player of the match: Smriti Mandhana (Ind)

- India won the toss and elected to bat.
- No further play was possible due to rain.
- Harmanpreet Kaur (Ind) became the first player among male or female, to play 150th T20Is.

21 February 2023
15:00
Scorecard

England; 213/5 (20 overs)	v	Pakistan; 99/9 (20 overs)
Nat Sciver-Brunt 81* (40); Fatima Sana 2/44 (4 overs)		Tuba Hassan 28 (20); Katherine Sciver-Brunt 2/14 (4 overs)

England won by 114 runs
Newlands Cricket Ground, Cape Town
Umpires: Lauren Agenbag (SA) and Vrinda Rathi (Ind)
Player of the match: Nat Sciver-Brunt (Eng)

- England won the toss and elected to bat.
- England's score of 213/5 was the highest total in a women's T20 World Cup match.
- England's margin of victory was the highest (by runs) in a women's T20 World Cup match.

== Knockout stage ==
=== Bracket ===
Semi-finals
Australia	172/4 (20 overs)
India	167/8 (20 overs)
South Africa	164/4 (20 overs)
England	158/8 (20 overs)

Final
Australia	156/6 (20 overs)
South Africa	137/6 (20 overs)

=== Semi-finals ===
23 February 2023
15:00
Scorecard

Australia; 172/4 (20 overs)	v	India; 167/8 (20 overs)
Beth Mooney 54 (37); Shikha Pandey 2/32 (4 overs)		Harmanpreet Kaur 52 (34); Darcie Brown 2/18 (4 overs)

Australia won by 5 runs
Newlands Cricket Ground, Cape Town
Umpires: Kim Cotton (NZ) and Nimali Perera (SL)
Player of the match: Ashleigh Gardner (Aus)

- Australia won the toss and elected to bat.

24 February 2023
15:00
Scorecard

South Africa; 164/4 (20 overs)	v	England; 158/8 (20 overs)
Tazmin Brits 68 (55); Sophie Ecclestone 3/22 (4 overs)		Nat Sciver-Brunt 40 (34); Ayabonga Khaka 4/29 (4 overs)

South Africa won by 6 runs
Newlands Cricket Ground, Cape Town
Umpires: Claire Polosak (Aus) and Jacqueline Williams (WI)
Player of the match: Tazmin Brits (SA)

- South Africa won the toss and elected to bat.
- Tazmin Brits (SA) equalled the record for taking most number of catches in a WT20I match (4 catches).
- South Africa qualified for the Women's T20 World Cup final for the first time.

=== Final ===
26 February 2023
15:00
Scorecard

Australia; 156/6 (20 overs)	v	South Africa; 137/6 (20 overs)
Beth Mooney 74* (53); Shabnim Ismail 2/26 (4 overs)		Laura Wolvaardt 61 (48); Ashleigh Gardner 1/20 (4 overs)

Australia won by 19 runs
Newlands Cricket Ground, Cape Town
Attendance: 12,782
Umpires: Kim Cotton (NZ) and Jacqueline Williams (WI)
Player of the match: Beth Mooney (Aus)

- Australia won the toss and elected to bat.
- Jess Jonassen (Aus) played in her 100th T20I.

== Statistics ==
=== Highest Run-scorers ===
Runs	Player	Team
230	Laura Wolvaardt	South Africa
216	Nat Sciver-Brunt	England
206	Beth Mooney	Australia
189	Alyssa Healy	Australia
189	Tazmin Brits	South Africa

- Source: CricInfo

=== Highest Wicket-takers ===
Wickets	Player	Team
11	Sophie Ecclestone	England
10	Megan Schutt	Australia
10	Ashleigh Gardner	Australia
9	Marizanne Kapp	South Africa
8	Shabnim Ismail	South Africa
8	Lea Tahuhu	New Zealand

- Source: CricInfo

=== Team of the tournament ===
On 27 February 2023, ICC announced its team of the tournament picked by a selection panel featuring Ian Bishop, Anjum Chopra, Lisa Sthalekar, Mel Jones, Nasser Hussain, Ebony Rainford-Brent and Mpumelelo Mbangwa.

- (South Africa) Tazmin Brits
- (Australia) Alyssa Healy (wk)
- (South Africa) Laura Wolvaardt
- (England) Nat Sciver-Brunt (c)
- (Australia) Ashleigh Gardner
- (India) Richa Ghosh
- (England) Sophie Ecclestone
- (Cricket West Indies) Karishma Ramharack
- (South Africa) Shabnim Ismail
- (Australia) Darcie Brown
- (Australia) Megan Schutt
- (Ireland) Orla Prendergast (12th player)
