= Murshida Khatun =

Bangladeshi cricketer (born 1999)

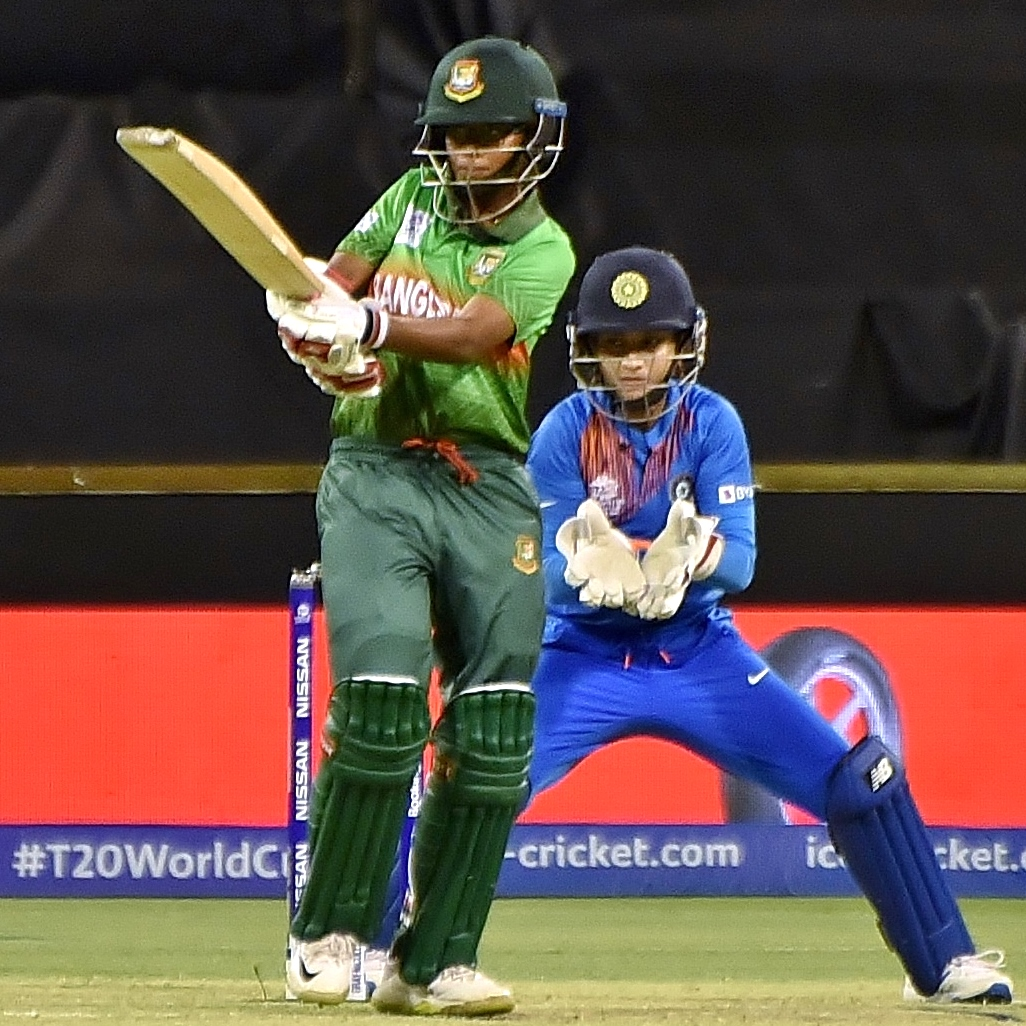
- Murshida batting for Bangladesh during the 2020 ICC Women's T20 World Cup

Personal information
- Full name: Murshida Khatun
- Born: 7 July 1999 (age 27); Bangladesh
- Batting: Left-handed
- Role: Batter

International information
- National side: Bangladesh
- ODI debut (cap 27): 4 May 2018 v South Africa
- Last ODI: 27 March 2024 v Australia
- T20I debut (cap 27): 20 May 2018 v South Africa
- Last T20I: 12 October 2024 v South Africa
- T20I shirt no.: 75

Domestic team information
- Years: Team
- 2017–2017/18: Sylhet Division
- 2021/22–present: Northern Zone

Career statistics
Competition	WODI	WT20I
Matches	26	50
Runs scored	430	922
Batting average	20.47	21.44
100s/50s	0/3	0/6
Top score	91*	80
Catches/stumpings	5/–	8/–
Medal record
Representing Bangladesh
Women's Cricket
South Asian Games
Gold medal – first place	2019 Kathmandu/Pokhara	Team
- Source: Cricinfo, 12 October 2024

Murshida Khatun (Bengali: মুর্শিদা খাতুন; born 7 July 1999) is a Bangladeshi cricketer who plays as a left-handed batter. She was named in Bangladeshi squad for the 2017 Women's Cricket World Cup Qualifier. She made her Women's One Day International cricket (WODI) debut and WT20I debut against South Africa Women on 4 May 2018 and 20 May 2018, respectively, during the Bangladesh women's cricket team tour of South Africa in 2018.

In August 2019, she was named in Bangladesh's squad for the 2019 ICC Women's World Twenty20 Qualifier tournament in Scotland, and in November 2019, for the cricket tournament at the 2019 South Asian Games. The Bangladesh team beat Sri Lanka by two runs in the final to win the cricket gold medal at the South Asian Games.

In January 2020, she was named in Bangladesh's squad for the 2020 ICC Women's T20 World Cup in Australia. In November 2021, she was named in Bangladesh's team for the 2021 Women's Cricket World Cup Qualifier tournament in Zimbabwe. In January 2022, she was named in Bangladesh's team for the 2022 Commonwealth Games Cricket Qualifier tournament in Malaysia. Later the same month, she was named in Bangladesh's team for the 2022 Women's Cricket World Cup in New Zealand.

On 31 March 2023, she became the first Bangladeshi centurion in women's first-class cricket, while playing for Team Jamuna in the 2022–23 Bangladesh Women's Cricket League.

She was named in the Bangladesh squad for the 2024 ICC Women's T20 World Cup.
