= Fargana Hoque =

Bangladeshi cricketer (born 1993)

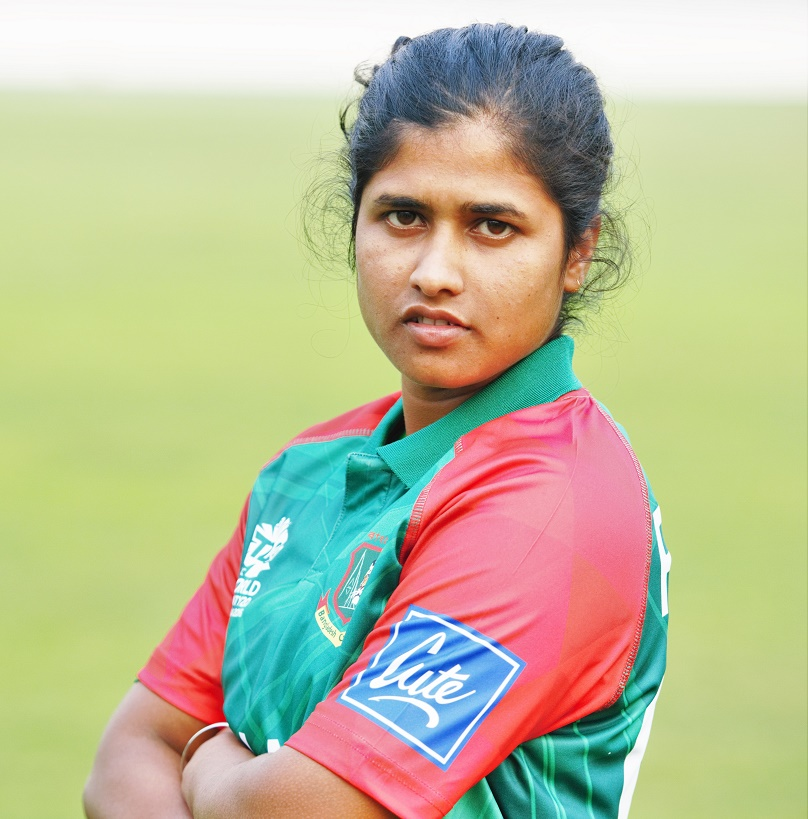
- Fargana Hoque in 2016

Personal information
- Full name: Fargana Hoque Pinky
- Born: 19 March 1993 (age 33); Gaibandha, Bangladesh
- Height: 5 ft 3 in (1.60 m)
- Batting: Right-handed
- Role: Batter

International information
- National side: Bangladesh (2011–present)
- ODI debut (cap 1): 26 November 2011 v Ireland
- Last ODI: 27 March 2024 v Australia
- ODI shirt no.: 99
- T20I debut (cap 1): 28 August 2012 v Ireland
- Last T20I: 12 May 2024 v Sri Lanka

Domestic team information
- Years: Team
- 2008/09–2010/11: Rajshahi Division
- 2012/13: Rangpur Division
- 2017–2017/18: Barisal Division
- 2021/22–present: Southern Zone

Career statistics
Competition	WODI	WT20I
Matches	65	84
Runs scored	1,507	1,253
Batting average	26.43	18.70
100s/50s	2/10	1/3
Top score	107	110*
Catches/stumpings	16/–	21/–
Medal record
Representing Bangladesh
Women's Cricket
Asian Games
Silver medal – second place	2010 Guangzhou	Team
Silver medal – second place	2014 Incheon	Team
Bronze medal – third place	2022 Hangzhou	Team
South Asian Games
Gold medal – first place	2019 Kathmandu/Pokhara	Team
Women's Asia Cup
Winner	2018 Malaysia
- Source: ESPNcricinfo, 12 October 2024

Fargana Hoque (Bengali: ফারজানা হক) (born 19 March 1993) is a Bangladeshi cricketer who plays for the Bangladesh cricket team as a right-handed batter.

== Early life ==
Hoque was born in Gaibandha, Bangladesh.

== Career ==
Hoque was a member of the silver medal-winning team that lost the cricket event final against the Pakistan national women's cricket team at the 2010 Asian Games in Guangzhou, China.

Hoque made her ODI and T20I debuts against Ireland on 26 November 2011 and 28 August 2012, respectively. In June 2018, she was part of Bangladesh's squad that won their first ever Women's Asia Cup title, winning the 2018 Women's Twenty20 Asia Cup tournament. Later the same month, she was named in Bangladesh's squad for the 2018 ICC Women's World Twenty20 Qualifier tournament.

In October 2018, she was named in Bangladesh's squad for the 2018 ICC Women's World Twenty20 tournament in the West Indies.

In August 2019, she was named in Bangladesh's squad for the 2019 ICC Women's World Twenty20 Qualifier tournament in Scotland. In November 2019, she was named in Bangladesh's squad for the cricket tournament at the 2019 South Asian Games. The Bangladesh team beat Sri Lanka by two runs in the final to win the gold medal.

In January 2020, she was named in Bangladesh's squad for the 2020 ICC Women's T20 World Cup in Australia. In November 2021, she was named in Bangladesh's team for the 2021 Women's Cricket World Cup Qualifier tournament in Zimbabwe. In January 2022, she was named in Bangladesh's team for the 2022 Commonwealth Games Cricket Qualifier tournament in Malaysia. Later the same month, she was named in Bangladesh's team for the 2022 Women's Cricket World Cup in New Zealand. On 25 March 2022, in Bangladesh's World Cup match against Australia, she became the first batter for Bangladesh Women to score 1,000 runs in WODIs. In December 2023, she became the first Bangladeshi women cricketer to score an overseas century.

Hoque was part of the Bangladesh squad for the 2025 Women's Cricket World Cup Qualifier in Pakistan in April 2025.
