= Rabeya Khan =

Bangladeshi cricketer (born 2005)

Personal information
- Full name: Rabeya Khan
- Born: 11 March 2005 (age 21); Barisal, Bangladesh
- Bowling: Right-arm leg break
- Role: All-rounder

International information
- National side: Bangladesh
- ODI debut (cap 32): 11 December 2022 v New Zealand
- Last ODI: 10 November 2023 v Pakistan
- T20I debut (cap 30): 4 December 2019 v Nepal
- Last T20I: 29 October 2023 v Pakistan
- T20I shirt no.: 2

Domestic team information
- Years: Team
- 2021/22–present: Southern Zone

Career statistics
Competition	WT20I
Matches	2
Runs scored	–
Batting average	–
100s/50s	–
Top score	–
Balls bowled	36
Wickets	4
Bowling average	2.25
5 wickets in innings	0
10 wickets in match	0
Best bowling	4/8
Catches/stumpings	1/–
Medal record
Representing Bangladesh
Women's Cricket
Asian Games
Bronze medal – third place	2022 Hangzhou	Team
South Asian Games
Gold medal – first place	2019 Kathmandu/Pokhara	Team
- Source: CricketArchive, 13 February 2023

Rabeya Khan (Bengali: রাবেয়া খান; born 11 March 2005) is a Bangladeshi cricketer who plays as a right-arm leg break bowler.

== Career ==
In November 2019, Khan earned her maiden call-up to the Bangladesh women's cricket team, for the 2019 Women's South Asian Games, which took place in Nepal. She made her Women's Twenty20 International (WT20I) debut against Nepal, on 4 December 2019, taking four wickets for eight runs and was named the player of the match. These were the fourth best bowling figures on debut and the fifth best bowling figure by a Bangladeshi bowler in a Women's T20I.

In January 2020, she was named as a standby player in the Bangladesh's squad for the 2020 ICC Women's T20 World Cup. In March 2021, she was named in the Bangladesh Women's Emerging team's squad for their home series against South Africa Emerging. In the third match of the series, she took three wickets while conceding 15 runs and was named the player of the match. She was selected to play for the Blue Team in the 2020–21 Bangabandhu 9th Bangladesh Games.

She was named in the Bangladesh squad for the 2024 ICC Women's T20 World Cup.

Khan was part of the Bangladesh squad for the 2025 Women's Cricket World Cup Qualifier in Pakistan in April 2025.
