= Ritu Moni =

Bangladeshi cricketer (born 1993)

Personal information
- Full name: Mosammat Ritu Moni
- Born: 5 February 1993 (age 33); Bogra, Bangladesh
- Batting: Right-handed
- Bowling: Right-arm medium
- Role: All-rounder

International information
- National side: Bangladesh (2012–present)
- ODI debut (cap 12): 20 August 2012 v Pakistan
- Last ODI: 10 November 2023 v Pakistan
- T20I debut (cap 6): 28 August 2012 v Ireland
- Last T20I: 29 October 2023 v Pakistan
- T20I shirt no.: 88

Domestic team information
- Years: Team
- 2009/10–2010/11: Rajshahi Division
- 2012/13: Sylhet Division
- 2017–2017/18: Mymensingh Division
- 2021/22–present: Northern Zone

Career statistics
Competition	WODI	WT20I
Matches	26	46
Runs scored	258	240
Batting average	17.20	11.42
100s/50s	0/0	0/0
Top score	33	39*
Balls bowled	620	501
Wickets	12	20
Bowling average	34.91	22.00
5 wickets in innings	0	0
10 wickets in match	0	0
Best bowling	3/37	4/18
Catches/stumpings	1/–	3/–
Medal record
Representing Bangladesh
Women's Cricket
Asian Games
Bronze medal – third place	2022 Hangzhou	Team
South Asian Games
Gold medal – first place	2019 Kathmandu/Pokhara	Team
- Source: ESPN Cricinfo, 12 February 2023

Mosammat Ritu Moni (Bengali: ঋতু মণি; born 5 February 1993) is a Bangladeshi cricketer who plays for the Bangladesh women's national cricket team, as a right-handed batter and a right-arm medium bowler.

== Career ==
Moni made her ODI debut against Pakistan on 20 August 2012 and her T20I debut against Ireland on 28 August 2012. In October 2018, she was named in Bangladesh's squad for the 2018 ICC Women's World Twenty20 tournament in the West Indies.

In August 2019, she was named in Bangladesh's squad for the 2019 ICC Women's World Twenty20 Qualifier tournament in Scotland. In November 2019, she was named in Bangladesh's squad for the cricket tournament at the 2019 South Asian Games. The Bangladesh team beat Sri Lanka by two runs in the final to win the gold medal.

In January 2020, she was named in Bangladesh's squad for the 2020 ICC Women's T20 World Cup in Australia. In November 2021, she was named in Bangladesh's team for the 2021 Women's Cricket World Cup Qualifier tournament in Zimbabwe. In January 2022, she was named in Bangladesh's team both for the 2022 Commonwealth Games Cricket Qualifier tournament in Malaysia and the 2022 Women's Cricket World Cup in New Zealand.

She was also part of the Bangladesh squad for the 2024 ICC Women's T20 World Cup, and the 2025 Women's Cricket World Cup Qualifier in Pakistan in April 2025.
