= Sobhana Mostary =

Bangladeshi cricketer (born 2002)

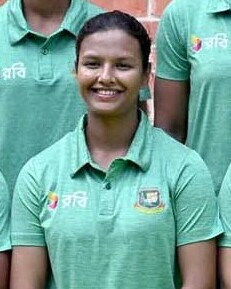

Personal information
- Full name: Sobhana Mostary
- Born: 13 February 2002 (age 24); Rangpur, Bangladesh
- Batting: Right-handed
- Bowling: Right-arm off break
- Role: Batter

International information
- National side: Bangladesh
- ODI debut (cap 29): 14 May 2018 v South Africa
- Last ODI: 24 March 2024 v Australia
- T20I debut (cap 28): 23 August 2019 v Netherlands
- Last T20I: 12 October 2024 v South Africa
- T20I shirt no.: 6

Domestic team information
- Years: Team
- 2017–2017/18: Rangpur Division
- 2021/22–present: Southern Zone

Career statistics
Competition	WODI	WT20I
Matches	13	42
Runs scored	108	472
Batting average	15.42	14.30
100s/50s	0/0	0/0
Top score	23*	44
Balls bowled	15	–
Wickets	0	–
Bowling average	–	–
5 wickets in innings	–	–
10 wickets in match	–	–
Best bowling	–	–
Catches/stumpings	3/–	12/–
Medal record
Representing Bangladesh
Women's Cricket
Asian Games
Bronze medal – third place	2022 Hangzhou	Team
South Asian Games
Gold medal – first place	2019 Kathmandu/Pokhara	Team
- Source: Cricinfo, 12 October 2024

Sobhana Mostary (Bengali: শোভনা মোস্তারি; born 13 February 2002) is a Bangladeshi cricketer who plays as a right-handed batter.

== Career ==
In April 2018, Mostary was named in the Bangladesh Women for their away series against South Africa Women. She made her Women's One Day International cricket (WODI) debut for Bangladesh against South Africa Women on 14 May 2018.

In August 2019, she was named in Bangladesh's squad for the 2019 ICC Women's World Twenty20 Qualifier tournament in Scotland. She made her Women's Twenty20 International (WT20I) debut, against the Netherlands, on 23 August 2019.

In January 2020, she was named in Bangladesh's squad for the 2020 ICC Women's T20 World Cup in Australia. In November 2021, she was named in Bangladesh's team for the 2021 Women's Cricket World Cup Qualifier tournament in Zimbabwe. In January 2022, she was named in Bangladesh's team for the 2022 Commonwealth Games Cricket Qualifier tournament in Malaysia. Later the same month, she was named in Bangladesh's team for the 2022 Women's Cricket World Cup in New Zealand.

She was named in the Bangladesh squad for the 2024 ICC Women's T20 World Cup.

Mostary was part of the Bangladesh squad for the 2025 Women's Cricket World Cup Qualifier in Pakistan in April 2025.
