= Bangladesh women's national cricket team =

Women's Cricket Team In Bangladesh

Bangladesh
- Nickname(s): Female Tigers, Tigresses
- Association: Bangladesh Cricket Board

Personnel
- Captain: Nigar Sultana (ODI); Nahida Akter (T20)
- Coach: Sarwar Imran

Team information
- Home ground: Sheikh Abu Naser Stadium, Khulna

History
- Test status acquired: 2021

International Cricket Council
- ICC status: Full member (2000); Affiliate member (1997)
- ICC region: Asia
ICC Rankings	Current	Best-ever
ODI	7th	5th (27 Nov 2021)
T20I	10th	8th (2 Oct 2020)

One Day Internationals
- First ODI: v Ireland at Bangladesh Krira Shikkha Protisthan No 2 Ground, Dhaka; 26 November 2011
- Last ODI: v Australia at Allan Border Field, Brisbane; 14 October 2026
ODIs	Played	Won/Lost
Total	90	26/56 (2 ties, 6 no results)
This year	6	1/5 (0 ties, 0 no results)
- World Cup appearances: 2 (first in 2022)
- Best result: 7th (2025)
- Women's World Cup Qualifier appearances: 3 (first in 2011)
- Best result: Runners-up (2025)

T20 Internationals
- First T20I: v Ireland at Castle Avenue cricket ground, Dublin; 28 August 2012
- Last T20I: v Thailand at Seven Districts Ground, Ajman; 18 November 2026
T20Is	Played	Won/Lost
Total	161	61/99 (0 ties, 1 no result)
This year	29	15/14 (0 ties, 0 no results)
- T20 World Cup appearances: 7 (first in 2014)
- Best result: Group stage (2014, 2016, 2018, 2020, 2023, 2024, 2026)
- T20 World Cup Qualifier appearances: 5 (first in 2015)
- Best result: Champions (2018, 2019, 2022, 2026)
Test kit
ODI kit
T20I kit
- As of 18 November 2026

The Bangladesh women's national cricket team represents Bangladesh in international women's cricket matches. They made their international debut when they played, and won, two matches against Thailand in July 2007 before participating in and winning the 2007 ACC Women's Tournament. Bangladesh were granted One-Day International (ODI) status in 2011 after finishing fifth in the 2011 Women's Cricket World Cup Qualifier. They subsequently qualified for the 2014 ICC Women's World Twenty20 as hosts, making their first appearance at a top-level women's international tournament. They have also won the 2018 edition of ACC Women's Asia Cup. This was the only instance in ACC Women's Asia Cup where any team other than India won the tournament. However, they finished fifth in the next edition (2022 edition) of Women's Asia Cup, but have since gone on to become one of the most competitive women's cricket teams in Asia. The team made its first World Cup appearance at the 2022 Women's Cricket World Cup, and has participated in every edition of the World Twenty20 since making its debut at the 2014 edition.

On 24 November 2011, Bangladesh women's team was granted ODI status after defeating USA by 9 wickets in the 2011 Women's Cricket World Cup Qualifier. This win against USA guaranteed that Bangladesh would finish in the top 6 in the tournament and thus be ranked in the top 10 globally, which was the requirement for attaining ODI status. In April 2021, the ICC awarded permanent Test and One Day International (ODI) status to all full member women's teams.

== History ==
=== 2018 Women's Twenty20 Asia Cup ===
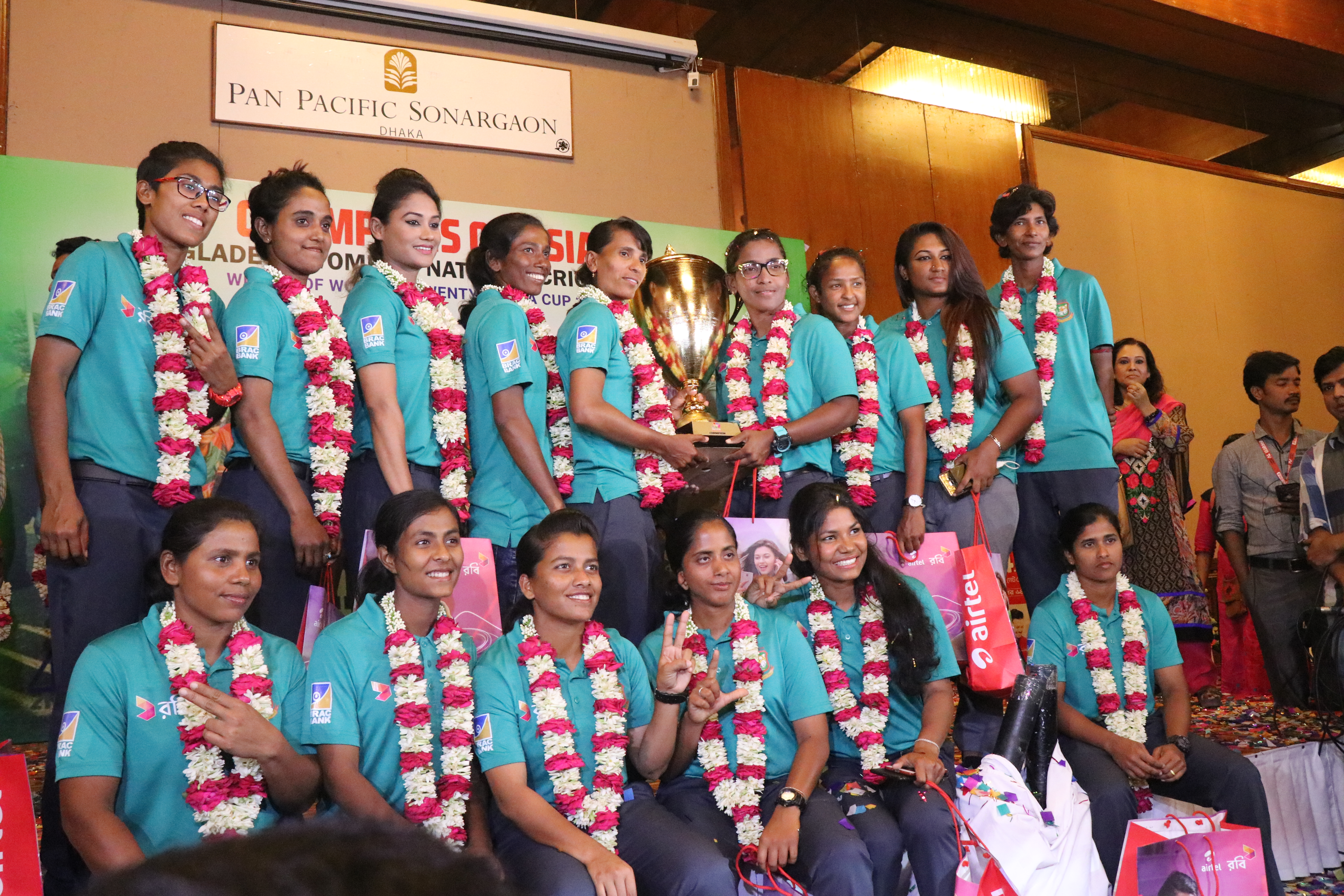
Asia Cup 2018 winner team with trophy

At the 2018 Women's Twenty20 Asia Cup in Malaysia, Bangladesh qualified for the final by winning 4 of their 5 matches, before beating India in the final, thus becoming the first team other than India to win an Asia Cup Title.

=== 2022 ICC Women's Cricket World Cup ===
Bangladesh made their debut at the ICC Women's Cricket World Cup in 2022, qualifying on the basis of their WODI ranking after the qualifying tournament was abandoned during the group stage, with Bangladesh having a 2–1 record at the point of abandonment, with wins over Pakistan and the US, and a loss to Thailand. They would go on to finish 7th with a 1–6 record, with a win over Pakistan. As a result of their qualification for the World Cup, they also qualified for the 2022–2025 ICC Women's Championship.

=== 2022 Women's Twenty20 Asia Cup ===
Bangladesh hosted the Women's Twenty20 Asia Cup in 2022, finishing 5th place with 2 wins, 3 losses, and 1 no-result from 6 matches.

=== 2023 ICC Women's T20 World Cup ===
Bangladesh qualified for the 2023 ICC Women's T20 World Cup by winning the qualifying tournament in 2022. Drawn in group A, the team lost all 4 of their matches.

=== 2024 Women's Twenty20 Asia Cup ===
Bangladesh automatically qualified for the 2024 Women's Twenty20 Asia Cup as a full-member, and reached the semifinals.

=== 2024 ICC Women's T20 World Cup ===
Bangladesh had originally been slated to host the 2024 ICC Women's T20 World Cup and therefore automatically qualified; however, political unrest in Bangladesh caused it to be moved to the United Arab Emirates instead. Bangladesh won their first game in the finals since they last hosted the tournament in 2014, beating Scotland, but was otherwise eliminated in the group stage.

=== 2025 ICC Women's Cricket World Cup ===
Bangladesh qualified for 2025 ICC Women's Cricket World Cup after finishing 2nd with a 3–2 record, ahead of the West Indies on net run rate at the qualifying tournament.

== Current squad ==
This lists all the players who have played for Bangladesh in past 12 months, or were named in the most recent ODI or T20I squad. Uncapped players are listed in italics

Name	Age	Batting style	Bowling style	Forms	Notes
Batters
Murshida Khatun	27	Left-handed		ODI, T20I	
Fargana Hoque	33	Right-handed		ODI, T20I	
Sobhana Mostary	24	Right-handed	Right-arm leg break	ODI, T20I	
Sumaiya Akter	21	Right-handed	Right-arm off break	ODI, T20I	
Rubya Haider	29	Left-handed		T20I	
All-rounders
Ritu Moni	33	Right-handed	Right-arm medium	ODI, T20I	
Shorna Akter	19	Right-handed	Right-arm leg break	ODI, T20I	
Wicket-keepers
Nigar Sultana	29	Right-handed		ODI, T20I	Captain
Shamima Sultana	38	Right-handed		ODI, T20I	
Dilara Akter	22	Right-handed		T20I	
Farzana Akter	27	Right-handed		ODI	
Spin Bowlers
Nahida Akter	26	Right-handed	Slow left-arm orthodox	ODI, T20I	Vice-captain
Fahima Khatun	34	Right-handed	Right-arm leg break	ODI, T20I	
Rabeya Khan	21	Right-handed	Right-arm leg break	ODI, T20I	
Sultana Khatun	30	Right-handed	Right-arm off break	ODI, T20I	
Shorifa Khatun	33	Right-handed	Right-arm off break	T20I	
Nishita Akter Nishi	18	Right-handed	Right-arm off break	ODI	
Pace Bowlers
Marufa Akter	21	Right-handed	Right-arm medium	ODI, T20I	
Fariha Trisna	24	Right-handed	Left-arm medium	T20I	
Disha Biswas	22	Right-handed	Right-arm medium	ODI	
Habiba Islam	17	Right-handed	Right-arm medium	T20I	

Updated as of 16 April 2024.

== Coaching staff ==
Position	Name
Head coach	(Bangladesh) Sorowar Imran
Assistant coach	(Bangladesh) Faisal Hossain
Chief selector	(Bangladesh) Manjurul Islam
Performance analyst	(Bangladesh) Rashed Iqbal

== Tournament history ==
=== ICC Women's Cricket World Cup ===
Women's Cricket World Cup record									Qualification record				
Host/Year	Result	Pos	№	Pld	W	L	T	NR	Pld	W	L	T	NR
(England) 1973	Not eligible								Not an ICC Member				
(India) 1978	Did not participate								Did not participate				
(New Zealand) 1982	Did not participate								Did not participate				
(Australia) 1988	Did not participate								Did not participate				
(Australia) 1993	Did not participate								Did not participate				
(India) 1997	Did not participate								Did not participate				
(New Zealand) 2000	Did not participate								Did not participate				
(South Africa) 2005	Did not participate								Did not participate				
(Australia) 2009	Did not participate								Did not participate				
(India) 2013	Did not qualify								7	4	3	0	0
(England) 2017	Did not qualify								7	3	4	0	0
(New Zealand) 2022	Group stage	7th	8	7	1	6	0	0	3	2	1	0	0
(India) 2025	Group stage	7th	8	7	1	5	0	1	5	3	2	0	0
Total	0 titles			14	2	11	0	1	22	12	10	0	0

=== ICC Women's Twenty20 World Cup ===
Women's Twenty20 World Cup record									Qualification record				
Host/Year	Result	Pos	№	Pld	W	L	T	NR	Pld	W	L	T	NR
(England) 2009	Did not qualify								Outside Top 8 in ICC Rankings				
(Cricket West Indies) 2010	Did not qualify								Outside Top 8 in ICC Rankings				
(Sri Lanka) 2012	Did not qualify								Outside Top 8 in ICC Rankings				
(Bangladesh) 2014	Group stage	9th	10	5	2	3	0	0	Qualified directly as hosts				
(India) 2016	Group stage	9th	10	4	0	4	0	0	5	4	1	0	0
(Cricket West Indies) 2018	Group stage	9th	10	4	0	4	0	0	5	5	0	0	0
(Australia) 2020	Group stage	10th	10	4	0	4	0	0	5	5	0	0	0
(South Africa) 2023	Group stage	9th	10	4	0	4	0	0	5	5	0	0	0
(United Arab Emirates) 2024	Group stage	7th	10	4	1	3	0	0	Qualified directly as hosts				
(England) 2026	Group stage	8th	12	5	2	3	0	0	7	7	0	0	0
Total	0 titles			30	5	25	0	0	27	26	1	0	0

=== ACC Women's Asia Cup ===
Women's Asia Cup record
Host/Year	Result	Pos	№	Pld	W	L	T	NR
(Sri Lanka) 2004	Did not participate							
(Pakistan) 2005	Did not participate							
(India) 2006	Did not participate							
(Sri Lanka) 2008	Group stage	4th	4	6	1	5	0	0
(China) 2012	Semi final	3rd	8	4	3	1	0	0
(Thailand) 2016	Group stage	4th	6	5	2	3	0	0
(Malaysia) 2018	Champions	1st	6	6	5	1	0	0
(Bangladesh) 2022	Group stage	5th	7	6	2	3	0	1
(Sri Lanka) 2024	Semi final	3rd	8	4	2	2	0	0
Total	1 title			31	15	15	0	1

=== Asian Games ===
Asian Games record
Host/Year	Result	Pos	№	Pld	W	L	T	NR
(China) 2010	Silver	2nd	8	4	3	1	0	0
(South Korea) 2014	Silver	2nd	10	3	2	1	0	0
(China) 2022	Bronze	3rd	9	3	1	1	0	1
(Japan) 2026	Qualified							
Total	3 medals			10	6	3	0	1

=== South Asian Games ===
South Asian Games record
Host/Year	Result	Pos	№	Pld	W	L	T	NR
(Nepal) 2019	Gold	1st	4	4	4	0	0	0
Total	1 medal			9	7	1	0	1

=== ACC Women's Asia Cup Rising Stars ===
Asia Cup Rising Stars record (as Bangladesh A Team)
Period	Result	Pos	№	Pld	W	L	T	NR
(Hong Kong) 2023	Runner up	2nd	8	5	2	1	0	2
(Thailand) 2026	Runner up	2nd	8	5	4	1	0	0
Total	0 titles			10	6	2	0	2

== Honours ==
=== ACC ===
- Women's Asia Cup:
  - Champions (1): 2018

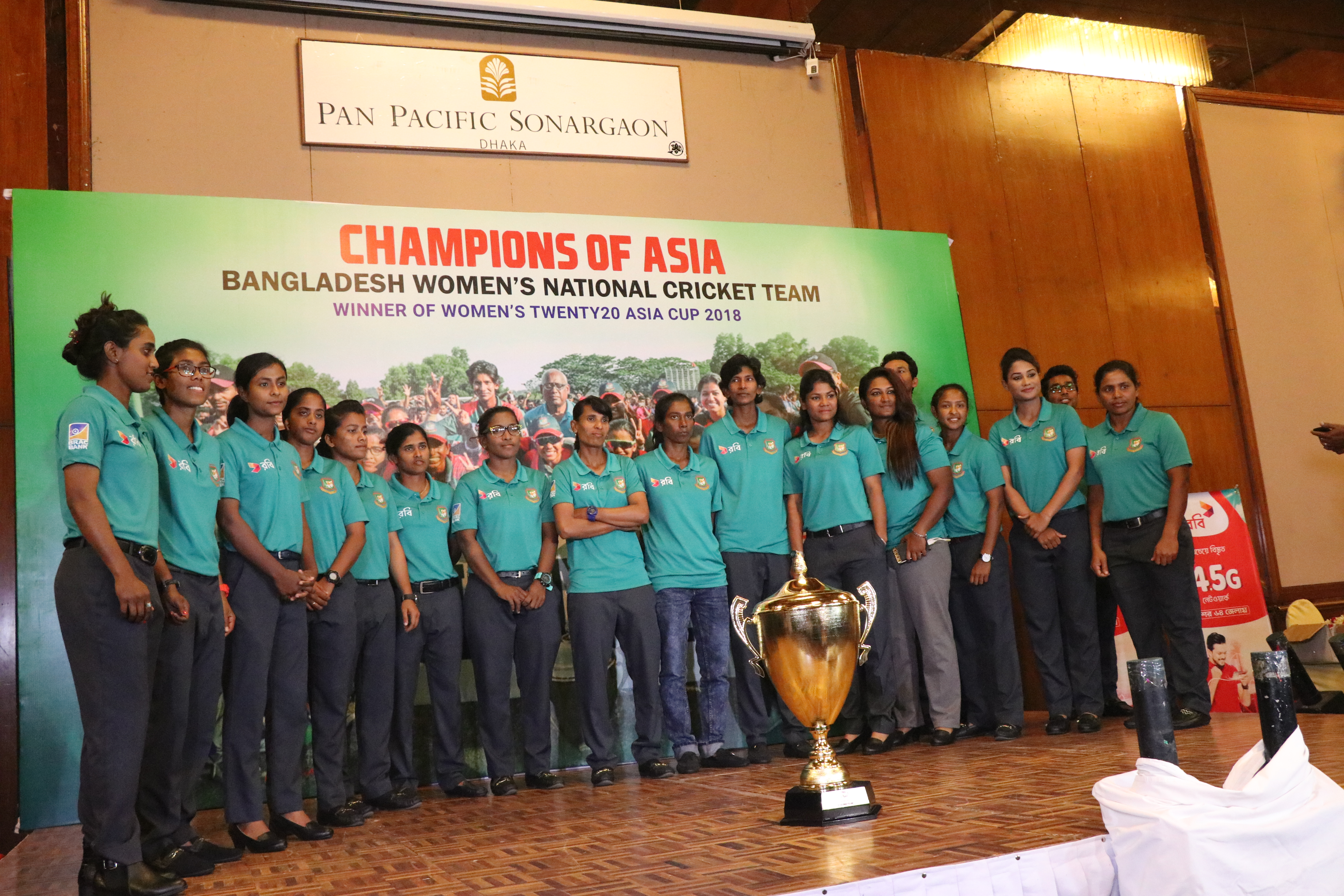
Asia Cup 2018 victory celebration of Bangladesh National Women Cricket team in Dhaka.

=== Others ===
- Asian Games
  - Silver Medal (2): 2010, 2014
  - Bronze Medal (1): 2022
- South Asian Games
  - Gold Medal (1): 2019

== Records and statistics ==
International Match Summary — Bangladesh Women

As of 18 November 2026

Playing record
Format	M	W	L	T	NR	Inaugural match
One-Day Internationals	90	26	56	2	6	26 November 2011
Twenty20 Internationals	161	61	99	0	1	28 August 2012

=== Women's One-Day Internationals ===
- Highest team total: 276/6 v. Scotland on 15 April 2025 at Lahore City Cricket Association Ground, Lahore.
- Highest individual innings: 107, Fargana Hoque v. India on 22 July 2023 at Sher-e-Bangla National Cricket Stadium, Mirpur.
- Best innings bowling: 6/20, Khadija Tul Kubra v. Pakistan on 8 October 2018 at Sheikh Kamal International Stadium, Cox's Bazar.

Most ODI runs for Bangladesh Women

Player	Runs	Average	Career span
Fargana Hoque	1,928	26.77	2011–2025
Nigar Sultana	1,474	27.29	2015–2025
Sharmin Akhter	1,341	26.82	2011–2025
Rumana Ahmed	963	22.92	2011–2022
Ritu Moni	604	17.76	2012–2025

Most ODI wickets for Bangladesh Women

Player	Wickets	Average	Career span
Nahida Akter	75	23.56	2015–2025
Salma Khatun	52	22.69	2011–2022
Rumana Ahmed	50	25.46	2011–2022
Jahanara Alam	48	30.39	2011–2023
Khadija Tul Kubra	42	19.85	2011–2021

ODI record versus other nations

Records complete to WODI #1570. Last updated 14 October 2026.

Opponent	M	W	L	T	NR	First match	First win
ICC Full members
Australia	8	0	8	0	0	25 March 2022	
England	2	0	2	0	0	27 March 2022	
India	9	1	6	1	1	8 April 2013	16 July 2023
Ireland	10	7	1	0	2	26 November 2011	26 November 2011
New Zealand	5	0	3	0	2	7 March 2022	
Pakistan	18	10	8	0	0	20 August 2012	4 March 2014
South Africa	22	3	19	0	0	6 September 2012	6 September 2012
Sri Lanka	7	1	5	0	1	19 February 2017	20 April 2026
West Indies	5	1	4	0	0	18 March 2022	21 January 2025
Zimbabwe	3	3	0	0	0	10 November 2021	10 November 2021
ICC Associate members
Scotland	1	1	0	0	0	15 April 2025	15 April 2025
Thailand	1	1	0	0	0	10 April 2025	10 April 2025

=== Women's Twenty20 Internationals ===
- Highest team total: 255/2 v. Maldives on 5 December 2019 at Pokhara Stadium, Pokhara.
- Highest individual innings: 113*, Nigar Sultana v. Maldives on 5 December 2019 at Pokhara Stadium, Pokhara.
- Best innings bowling: 5/12, Nahida Akter v. Kenya on 19 January 2022 at Kinrara Academy Oval, Kuala Lumpur.

Most T20I runs for Bangladesh Women

Player	Runs	Average	Career span
Nigar Sultana	2,835	27.25	2015–2026
Fargana Hoque	1,253	18.70	2012–2023
Sobhana Mostary	1,200	19.04	2019–2026
Murshida Khatun	947	21.04	2018–2025
Dilara Akter	882	17.64	2022–2026

Most T20I wickets for Bangladesh Women

Player	Wickets	Average	Career span
Nahida Akter	132	17.55	2015–2026
Salma Khatun	84	18.57	2012–2023
Rumana Ahmed	75	19.01	2012–2024
Fahima Khatun	69	23.59	2013–2026
Rabeya Khan	62	19.17	2019–2026

T20I record versus other nations

Records complete to WT20I #3082. Last updated 18 November 2026.

Opponent	M	W	L	T	NR	First match	First win
ICC Full members
Australia	6	0	6	0	0	27 February 2020	
England	4	0	4	0	0	28 March 2014	
India	26	3	23	0	0	2 April 2013	6 June 2018
Ireland	15	9	6	0	0	28 August 2012	28 August 2012
New Zealand	5	0	5	0	0	29 February 2020	
Pakistan	23	5	18	0	0	29 August 2012	4 June 2018
South Africa	16	2	13	0	1	11 September 2012	11 September 2012
Sri Lanka	17	3	14	0	0	28 October 2012	28 October 2012
West Indies	7	0	7	0	0	26 March 2014	
Zimbabwe	1	1	0	0	0	13 November 2026	13 November 2026
ICC Associate members
Indonesia	1	1	0	0	0	31 August 2026	31 August 2026
Kenya	1	1	0	0	0	19 January 2022	19 January 2022
Malaysia	4	4	0	0	0	9 June 2018	9 June 2018
Maldives	1	1	0	0	0	5 December 2019	5 December 2019
Namibia	1	1	0	0	0	22 January 2026	22 January 2026
Nepal	1	1	0	0	0	4 December 2019	4 December 2019
Netherlands	7	5	2	0	0	8 July 2018	8 July 2018
Papua New Guinea	3	3	0	0	0	1 December 2015	1 December 2015
Scotland	8	7	1	0	0	29 November 2015	29 November 2015
Thailand	9	9	0	0	0	28 November 2015	28 November 2015
United Arab Emirates	2	2	0	0	0	10 July 2018	10 July 2018
United States	3	3	0	0	0	1 September 2019	1 September 2019

== See also ==
- List of Bangladesh women ODI cricketers
- List of Bangladesh women Twenty20 International cricketers
- Bangladesh national cricket team
