= 2026 Women's Asia Cup Rising Stars =

Cricket tournament

- Tournament logo
- Dates: 13 – 22 February 2026
- Administrator: Asian Cricket Council
- Cricket format: Twenty20, Twenty20 International
- Tournament format(s): Group round-robin and knockout
- Host: Thailand
- Champions: India A (2nd title)
- Runners-up: Bangladesh A
- Participants: 8
- Matches: 15
- Most runs: (United Arab Emirates) Esha Oza (200)
- Most wickets: (Bangladesh) Fahima Khatun (10) (India) Radha Yadav (10)

The 2026 Women's Asia Cup Rising Stars (also known as DP World Women's Asia Cup Rising Stars 2026 for sponsorship reasons) was the second edition of the Women's Asia Cup Rising Stars, and was played in Bangkok, Thailand, from 13 to 22 February 2026. Eight teams participated in the tournament, featuring the 'A' teams of four nations with ODI status and the senior national teams of the top four associate members in Asia. Organized by the Asian Cricket Council (ACC), all matches were held at the Terdthai Cricket Ground.

India A were the defending champions and retained their crown, winning their second title at the 2026 Women's Asia Cup Rising Stars, defeating Bangladesh A by 46 runs in the final.

== Background ==
The tournament was originally scheduled to be hosted by Sri Lanka Cricket in June 2025. However, the ACC postponed the event due to a combination of adverse weather conditions and health concerns following an outbreak of chikungunya in the region. Thailand was subsequently selected as the replacement host to provide a neutral venue and more stable weather during the February window.

Formally known as the ACC Women's T20 Emerging Teams Asia Cup, the "Rising Stars" initiative was established to bridge the gap between domestic cricket and the senior international level. It serves as a developmental platform for young players to gain international experience. India A entered the 2026 edition as the defending champions, having defeated Bangladesh A by 31 runs in the inaugural final held in Hong Kong in 2023.

== Squads ==
| Bangladesh A | India A | Malaysia | Nepal |
|---|---|---|---|
| Fahima Khatun (c); Sadia Akter; Sumaiya Akter; Farjana Easmin; Jannatul Ferdous; Rubya Haider (wk); Fatema Jahan; Shorifa Khatun; Sanjida Akter Meghla; Lata Mondal; Taj Nehar; Shamima Sultana (wk); Sharmin Sultana; Ishma Tanjim; Fariha Trisna | Radha Yadav (c); Vrinda Dinesh; Tejal Hasabnis; Humairaa Kaazi; Jintamani Kalita; Tanuja Kanwar; Nandini Kashyap (wk); Mamta Madiwala (wk); Minnu Mani; Sonia Mendhiya; Prema Rawat; Anushka Sharma; Nandni Sharma; Saima Thakor; Deeya Yadav | Mas Elysa (c); Nur Arianna Natsya; Irdina Beh Nabil; Nur Dania Syuhada; Aisya Eleesa; Ainna Hamizah Hashim; Nazatul Hidayah Husna Binti Razali; Nur Isma Dania Binti Mohd Daniel; Mahirah Izzati Ismail; Nur Izzatul Syafiqa; Wan Julia (wk); Suabika Manivannan; Aina Najwa (wk); Musfirah Nur Ainaa; Amalin Sorfina | Puja Mahato (c); Suman Bista; Rubina Chhetry; Kabita Joshi; Anu Kadayat; Seemana KC; Samjhana Khadka; Kabita Kunwar; Sita Rana Magar; Rubi Poddar (wk); Bindu Rawal; Riya Sharma; Kajal Shrestha (wk); Roma Thapa; Manisha Upadhayay |
| Pakistan A | Sri Lanka A | Thailand | United Arab Emirates |
| ~~Umm-e-Hani (c)~~; Hafsa Khalid (c); Waheeda Akhtar; Yusra Amir (wk); Lubna Behram; Syeda Masooma Jafri; Komal Khan (wk); Neha Sharmin Nadeem; Eman Naseer; Anosha Nasir; Momina Riasat; Gull Rukh; Huraina Sajjad; Omaima Sohail; Noreen Yaqoob; Shawaal Zulfiqar | Anushka Sanjeewani (c, wk); Mithali Bandara; Vitini Chandima; Ishani Hansima; Yasanthi Herath; Ama Kanchana; Sanjana Kavindi; Sachini Nisansala; Sathya Sandeepani; Nethmi Senarathna; Rashmi Silva; Shayani Shashikala; Malsha Shehani; Chethana Vimukthi; Shashini Wijayarathna | Naruemol Chaiwai (c); Kanyakorn Bunthansen; Nannaphat Chaihan; Natthakan Chantham; Sunida Chaturongrattana; Onnicha Kamchomphu; Nannapat Koncharoenkai (wk); Suleeporn Laomi; Phannita Maya; Chayanisa Phengpaen; Arrikan Phuengkho; Thipatcha Putthawong; Onauma Senanok; Chanida Sutthiruang; Aphisara Suwanchonrathi | Esha Oza (c); Samaira Dharnidharka; Udeni Dona; Siya Gokhale; Heena Hotchandhani; Al Maseera Jahangir; Lavanya Keny; Suraksha Kotte; Vaishnave Mahesh; Keziah Miriam Sabin; Indhuja Nandakumar; Rinitha Rajith; Theertha Satish (wk); Athige Silva; Archara Supriya |

On 3 February 2026, Umm-e-Hani was added to Pakistan's senior squad for their tour of South Africa; she was replaced by Omaima Sohail, with Hafsa Khalid taking over as captain.

== Venue ==
The Asian Cricket Council (ACC) stated that the 2026 Women's Asia Cup Rising Stars tournament was moved to Bangkok, Thailand after Sri Lanka Cricket President Shammi Silva requested a postponement of the originally scheduled event in Sri Lanka due to adverse weather conditions and chikungunya related health concerns.

Venue in Thailand
| Bangkok | 2026 Women's Asia Cup Rising Stars (Thailand) |
|---|---|
| Terdthai Cricket Ground | 2026 Women's Asia Cup Rising Stars (Thailand) |
| Capacity: 4,000 | 2026 Women's Asia Cup Rising Stars (Thailand) |

== Group stage ==
The Asian Cricket Council announced the fixtures on 19 January 2026.

=== Group A ===
==== Points table ====
| Pos | Team | Pld | W | L | NR | Pts | NRR | Qualification |
|---|---|---|---|---|---|---|---|---|
| 1 | India A | 3 | 2 | 1 | 0 | 4 | 3.042 | Advanced to the knockout stage |
| 2 | Pakistan A | 3 | 2 | 1 | 0 | 4 | 0.457 | Advanced to the knockout stage |
| 3 | United Arab Emirates | 3 | 2 | 1 | 0 | 4 | −0.765 | Eliminated |
| 4 | Nepal | 3 | 0 | 3 | 0 | 0 | −2.596 | Eliminated |

Source: ESPNcricinfo

==== Fixtures ====
13 February 2026
09:30
Scorecard

| Pakistan A 137/6 (20 overs) | v | Nepal; 107/6 (20 overs) |
| Hafsa Khali 40* (39); Kabita Kunwar 2/10 (2 overs) | | Bindu Rawal 39 (45); Anosha Nasir 3/20 (4 overs) |

Pakistan A won by 30 runs
Terdthai Cricket Ground, Bangkok
Umpires: Dedunu Silva (SL) and Rokeya Sultana (Ban)
Player of the match: Hafsa Khali (Pakistan A)

- Nepal won the toss and elected to field.

13 February 2026
14:00
Scorecard

| India A 130/9 (20 overs) | v | United Arab Emirates; 131/3 (19.2 overs) |
| Anushka Sharma 47 (45); Samaira Dharnidharka 3/40 (4 overs) | | Esha Oza 72* (61); Radha Yadav 1/22 (3.2 overs) |

United Arab Emirates won by 7 wickets
Terdthai Cricket Ground, Bangkok
Umpires: Nur Hijrah (Mas) and Shathira Jakir (Ban)
Player of the match: Esha Oza (UAE)

- India A won the toss and elected to bat.

15 February 2026
09:30
Scorecard

| United Arab Emirates; 189/4 (20 overs) | v | Nepal; 171/5 (20 overs) |
| Esha Oza 125 (63); Manisha Upadhayay 2/12 (4 overs) | | Samjhana Khadka 58 (39); Suraksha Kotte 2/30 (4 overs) |

United Arab Emirates won by 18 runs
Terdthai Cricket Ground, Bangkok
Umpires: Nur Hijrah (Mas) and Gayathri Venugopalan (Ind)
Player of the match: Esha Oza (UAE)

- Nepal won the toss and elected to field.

15 February 2026
14:00
Scorecard

| Pakistan A 93 (18.5 overs) | v | India A 97/2 (11.1 overs) |
| Shawaal Zulfiqar 23 (29); Saima Thakor 2/14 (4 overs) | | Vrinda Dinesh 55* (29); Momina Riasat 1/13 (2.1 overs) |

India A won by 8 wickets
Terdthai Cricket Ground, Bangkok
Umpires: Shathira Jakir (Ban) and Dedunu Silva (SL)
Player of the match: Vrinda Dinesh (India A)

- Pakistan A won the toss and elected to bat.

17 February 2026
09:30
Scorecard

| Nepal; 78 (18 overs) | v | India A 82/3 (7.5 overs) |
| Samjhana Khadka 22 (16); Tanuja Kanwar 4/12 (4 overs) | | Vrinda Dinesh 39* (18); Manisha Upadhayay 1/28 (3 overs) |

India A won by 7 wickets
Terdthai Cricket Ground, Bangkok
Umpires: Shivani Mishra (Qat) and Dedunu Silva (SL)
Player of the match: Tanuja Kanwar (India A)

- India A won the toss and elected to field.
- India A qualified for the Semifinals as a result of this match.

17 February 2026
14:00
Scorecard

| United Arab Emirates; 79 (17.2 overs) | v | Pakistan A 81/1 (11 overs) |
| Theertha Satish 32 (27); Anosha Nasir 3/18 (4 overs) | | Shawaal Zulfiqar 38* (31); Heena Hotchandani 1/16 (3 overs) |

Pakistan A won by 9 wickets
Terdthai Cricket Ground, Bangkok
Umpires: Nur Hijrah (Mas) and Rokeya Sultana (Ban)
Player of the match: Anosha Nasir (Pakistan A)

- Pakistan A won the toss and elected to field.
- Pakistan A qualified for the Semifinals as a result of this match.

=== Group B ===
==== Points table ====
| Pos | Team | Pld | W | L | NR | Pts | NRR | Qualification |
|---|---|---|---|---|---|---|---|---|
| 1 | Bangladesh A | 3 | 3 | 0 | 0 | 6 | 1.601 | Advanced to the knockout stage |
| 2 | Sri Lanka A | 3 | 2 | 1 | 0 | 4 | 2.083 | Advanced to the knockout stage |
| 3 | Thailand | 3 | 1 | 2 | 0 | 2 | 1.236 | Eliminated |
| 4 | Malaysia | 3 | 0 | 3 | 0 | 0 | −4.971 | Eliminated |

Source: ESPNcricinfo

==== Fixtures ====
14 February 2026
09:30
Scorecard

| Thailand; 169/7 (20 overs) | v | Malaysia; 70/8 (20 overs) |
| Nannapat Koncharoenkai 73 (45); Nur Arianna Natsya 2/31 (4 overs) | | Nur Arianna Natsya 15 (28); Phannita Maya 3/14 (4 overs) |

Thailand won by 99 runs
Terdthai Cricket Ground, Bangkok
Umpires: Humaira Farah (Pak) and Gayathri Venugopalan (Ind)
Player of the match: Nannapat Koncharoenkai (Thailand)

- Thailand won the toss and elected to bat.
- Arrikan Phuengkho (Tha) made her T20I debut.

14 February 2026
14:00
Scorecard

| Bangladesh A 115 (19.5 overs) | v | Sri Lanka A 111/9 (20 overs) |
| Ishma Tanjim 30 (25); Sachini Nisansala 4/14 (4 overs) | | Hansima Karunaratne 26 (31); Sanjida Akter Meghla 3/20 (4 overs) |

Bangladesh A won by 4 runs
Terdthai Cricket Ground, Bangkok
Umpires: Rabab Ahsan (UAE) and Saleema Imtiaz (Pak)
Player of the match: Sanjida Akter Meghla (Bangladesh A)

- Bangladesh A won the toss and elected to bat.

16 February 2026
09:30
Scorecard

| Sri Lanka A 172/6 (20 overs) | v | Malaysia; 66/8 (20 overs) |
| Ama Kanchana 52 (29); Nur Dania Syuhada 2/22 (4 overs) | | Nur Izzatul Syafiqa 19 (24); Sachini Nisansala 2/7 (4 overs) |

Sri Lanka A won by 106 runs
Terdthai Cricket Ground, Bangkok
Umpires: Rabab Ahsan (UAE) and Humaira Farah (Pak)
Player of the match: Ama Kanchana (Sri Lanka A)

- Sri Lanka A won the toss and elected to bat.

16 February 2026
14:00
Scorecard

| Thailand; 103/9 (20 overs) | v | Bangladesh A 104/7 (19.5 overs) |
| Nannapat Koncharoenkai 34 (38); Fahima Khatun 2/16 (4 overs) | | Lata Mondal 30 (40); Thipatcha Putthawong 3/25 (4 overs) |

Bangladesh A won by 3 wickets
Terdthai Cricket Ground, Bangkok
Umpires: Nur Hijrah (Mas) and Saleema Imtiaz (Pak)
Player of the match: Farjana Easmin (Bangladesh A)

- Thailand won the toss and elected to bat.
- Bangladesh A qualified for the Semifinals as a result of this match.

18 February 2026
09:30
Scorecard

| Bangladesh A 157/7 (20 overs) | v | Malaysia; 61/9 (20 overs) |
| Lata Mondal 48 (44); Nur Dania Syuhada 2/30 (4 overs) | | Nur Arianna Natsya 22* (24); Fatema Jahan 3/10 (4 overs) |

Bangladesh A won by 90 runs
Terdthai Cricket Ground, Bangkok
Umpires: Saleema Imtiaz (Pak) and Shivani Mishra (Qat)
Player of the match: Lata Mondal (Bangladesh A)

- Bangladesh A won the toss and elected to bat.

18 February 2026
14:00
Scorecard

| Sri Lanka A 133/5 (20 overs) | v | Thailand; 110 (19.2 overs) |
| Hansima Karunaratne 62* (53); Phannita Maya 2/19 (4 overs) | | Natthakan Chantham 57 (49); Sathya Sandeepani 2/20 (4 overs) |

Sri Lanka A won by 23 runs
Terdthai Cricket Ground, Bangkok
Umpires: Gayathri Venugopalan (Ind) and Shathira Jakir (Ban)
Player of the match: Hansima Karunaratne (Sri Lanka A)

- Sri Lanka A won the toss and elected to bat.
- Sri Lanka A qualified for the Semifinals as a result of this match.

== Knockout stage ==
=== Bracket ===
Semi-finals
A1 | India A | 119/5 (13.3 overs)
B2 | Sri Lanka A | 118 (19.4 overs)
B1 | Bangladesh A | 110/8 (20 overs)
A2 | Pakistan A | 56 (16.4 overs)

Final
SF1 | India A | 134/7 (20 overs)
SF2 | Bangladesh A | 88 (19.1 overs)

=== Semi-finals ===
==== Semi-final 1 ====
20 February 2026
09:30
Scorecard

| Sri Lanka A 118 (19.4 overs) | v | India A 119/5 (13.3 overs) |
| Sanjana Kavindi 31 (35); Radha Yadav 4/19 (3.4 overs) | | Vrinda Dinesh 42 (20); Shashini Gimhani 2/33 (3 overs) |

India A won by 5 wickets
Terdthai Cricket Ground, Bangkok
Umpires: Shivani Mishra (Qat) and Rokeya Sultana (Ban)
Player of the match: Radha Yadav (India A)

- Sri Lanka A won the toss and elected to bat.
- India A advanced to the Final as a result of this match.

==== Semi-final 2 ====
20 February 2026
14:00
Scorecard

| Bangladesh A 110/8 (20 overs) | v | Pakistan A 56 (16.4 overs) |
| Fahima Khatun 40* (32); Hafsa Khalid 2/25 (4 overs) | | Shawaal Zulfiqar 14 (17); Sanjida Akter Meghla 3/6 (3.4 overs) |

Bangladesh A won by 54 runs
Terdthai Cricket Ground, Bangkok
Umpires: Shivani Mishra (Qat) and Dedunu Silva (SL)
Player of the match: Fahima Khatun (Bangladesh A)

- Pakistan A won the toss and elected to field.
- Bangladesh A advanced to the Final as a result of this match.

=== Final ===
22 February 2026
14:00
Scorecard

| India A 134/7 (20 overs) | v | Bangladesh A 88 (19.1 overs) |
| Tejal Hasabnis 51* (34); Fahima Khatun 4/25 (4 overs) | | Shamima Sultana 20 (16); Prema Rawat 3/12 (4 overs) |

India A won by 46 runs
Terdthai Cricket Ground, Bangkok
Umpires: Shivani Mishra (Qat) and Dedunu Silva (SL)
Player of the match: Tejal Hasabnis (India A)

- India A won the toss and elected to bat.

== Statistics ==
=== Most runs ===
Most runs scored by a batter
| Runs | Player | Team |
|---|---|---|
| 200 | Esha Oza | United Arab Emirates |
| 171 | Vrinda Dinesh | India A |
| 124 | Hansima Karunaratne | Sri Lanka A |
| 116 | Anushka Sharma | India A |
| 113 | Nannapat Koncharoenkai | Thailand |
Source:ESPNCricinfo

=== Most wickets ===
Most wickets taken by a bowler
| Wickets | Player | Team |
|---|---|---|
| 10 | Fahima Khatun | Bangladesh A |
| 10 | Radha Yadav | India A |
| 9 | Tanuja Kanwar | India A |
| 8 | Prema Rawat | India A |
| 8 | Sachini Nisansala | Sri Lanka A |
Source: ESPNCricinfo
