= 2026 Women's Emerging Nations Trophy =

International cricket tournament

- Dates: 12 – 25 November 2026
- Administrator: International Cricket Council (ICC)
- Cricket format: Twenty20 International
- Tournament format(s): Group stage and Final
- Host: United Arab Emirates
- Participants: 10
- Matches: 30

The 2026 ICC Women's Emerging Nations Trophy is the second edition of the ICC Women's Emerging Nations Trophy, an annual Twenty20 International (T20I) cricket tournament that is taking place from 12 to 25 November 2026 in United Arab Emirates.

In October 2026, ICC confirmed the expansion of the tournament to ten teams, with the inclusion of five full member teams alongside the associate member teams with ODI status.

== Teams and qualification ==
Unlike the previous edition, which featured eight associate member teams, the expanded tournament will be contested by the five associate member teams with ODI status, along with the five lowest ranked full member teams.

Means of qualification	Berth(s)	Qualified
Full member teams	5	Bangladesh
Full member teams	5	Ireland
Full member teams	5	Pakistan
Full member teams	5	Sri Lanka
Full member teams	5	Zimbabwe
Associate member teams with ODI status	5	Netherlands
Associate member teams with ODI status	5	Papua New Guinea
Associate member teams with ODI status	5	Scotland
Associate member teams with ODI status	5	Thailand
Associate member teams with ODI status	5	United Arab Emirates
Total	10	

== Squads ==
Bangladesh	Ireland	Netherlands	Pakistan	Papua New Guinea
Nahida Akter (c); Sobhana Mostary (vc); Dilara Akter (wk); Sharmin Akhter; Shorna Akter; Disha Biswas; Juairiya Ferdous (wk); Jannatul Ferdus; Rabeya Khan; Fahima Khatun; Sanjida Akter Meghla; Ritu Moni; Shathi Rani; Nigar Sultana (wk); Fariha Trisna	Gaby Lewis (c); Amy Hunter (vc, wk); Zara Craig; Alana Dalzell; Laura Delany; Georgina Dempsey; Abbi Harrison; Louise Little; Aimee Maguire; Jane Maguire; Lara Maritz; Lara McBride; Kia McCartney; Cara Murray	Babette de Leede (c, wk); Sterre Kalis; Sanya Khurana; Carlijn van Koolwijk; Hannah Landheer; Caroline de Lange; Rosalie Ann Lawrence (wk); Phebe Molkenboer; Frederique Overdijk; Myrthe van den Raad; Robine Rijke; Heather Siegers; Silver Siegers; Iris Zwilling	Muneeba Ali (c, wk); Ayesha Zafar (vc); Waheeda Akhtar; Eyman Fatima; Gull Feroza (wk); Umm-e-Hani; Tuba Hassan; Saira Jabeen; Eman Naseer; Momina Riasat; Tasmia Rubab; Nashra Sandhu; Sadaf Shamas; Omaima Sohail; Shawaal Zulfiqar	Brenda Tau (c, wk); Vicky Baruka; Hollan Doriga; Kevau Gabe; Sibona Jimmy; Dika Lohia; Eranai Pokana; Lakshmi Rajadurai; Tanya Ruma; Pauke Siaka; Hane Tau; Henao Thomas; Geua Tom; Naoani Vare
Scotland	Sri Lanka	Thailand	United Arab Emirates	Zimbabwe
Kathryn Bryce (c); Chloe Abel; Sarah Bryce (wk); Darcey Carter (wk); Priyanaz Chatterji; Gabriella Fontenla; Katherine Fraser; Kirstie Gordon; Abtaha Maqsood; Megan McColl; Hannah Rainey; Nayma Sheikh; Pippa Sproul (wk); Isabella Watson	Harshitha Samarawickrama (c); Kavisha Dilhari (vc); Imesha Dulani; Vishmi Gunaratne; Sanjana Kavindi; Sugandika Kumari; Malki Madara; Nimasha Meepage (Note: Chamudi Praboda was ruled out due to an injury and was replaced by Nimasha Meepage.); Kaushini Nuthyangana (wk); Hasini Perera; Chamudi Praboda; Sathya Sandeepani; Rashmika Sewwandi; Nilakshi de Silva; Chethana Vimukthi	Naruemol Chaiwai (c); Nannaphat Chaihan; Natthakan Chantham; Sunida Chaturongrattana; Naomi Hamilton; Onnicha Kamchomphu; Nannapat Koncharoenkai (wk); Suleeporn Laomi; Phannita Maya; Chayanisa Phengpaen; Sarnsiree Plant; Thipatcha Putthawong; Chanida Sutthiruang; Aphisara Suwanchonrathi	Esha Oza (c); Samaira Dharnidharka; Heena Hotchandani; Uttara Iyer; Al Maseera Jahangir; Suraksha Kotte; Mehul Kulkarni; Indhuja Nandakumar; Rinitha Rajith; Theertha Satish (wk); Simran Sheth; Sashikala Silva; Archara Supriya; Janani Thirukkumari	Josephine Nkomo (c); Beloved Biza; Olinder Chare; Chiedza Dhururu (wk); Nyasha Gwanzura; Tendai Makusha; Michelle Mavunga; Sharne Mayers; Chipo Mugeri-Tiripano; Modester Mupachikwa (wk); Christina Mutasa; Kelis Ndhlovu; Loryn Phiri; Nomvelo Sibanda

- Source: International Cricket Council, Cricinfo

== Group stage ==
=== Group A ===
Group A standings
Pos	Team	Pld	W	L	Pts	NRR	Qualification
1	Sri Lanka	4	4	0	8	2.222	Advanced to the Super Six
2	Scotland	4	3	1	6	1.698	Advanced to the Super Six
3	Ireland	4	2	2	4	−0.262	Advanced to the Super Six
4	United Arab Emirates (H)	4	1	3	2	−0.515	
5	Papua New Guinea	4	0	4	0	−2.936	

Source: Cricinfo
(H) Host

Match 1
12 November 2026
09:00 UTC+4
Scorecard

Ireland; 105/9 (20 overs)	v	Sri Lanka; 110/0 (13 overs)
Louise Little 28 (36); Sathya Sandeepani 3/9 (4 overs)		Vishmi Gunaratne 53* (37)

Sri Lanka won by 10 wickets
Karwan Sports Club Cricket Ground, Ajman
Umpires: Champa Chakma (Ban) and Precious Smith (Ber)
Player of the match: Sathya Sandeepani (SL)

- Sri Lanka won the toss and elected to field.
- Abbi Harrison and Kia McCartney (Ire) both made their T20I debuts.

Match 2
12 November 2026
09:00 UTC+4
Scorecard

Papua New Guinea; 93 (20 overs)	v	Scotland; 95/3 (13.1 overs)
Pauke Siaka 24 (28); Katherine Fraser 3/10 (4 overs)		Katherine Fraser 45 (29); Hane Tau 1/8 (2 overs)

Scotland won by 7 wickets
Seven Districts Sports Club, Ajman
Umpires: Ankita Guha (Ind) and Gayathri Venugopalan (Ind)
Player of the match: Katherine Fraser (Sco)

- Scotland won the toss and elected to field.

Match 5
13 November 2026
09:00 UTC+4
Scorecard

Scotland; 111/8 (20 overs)	v	Sri Lanka; 115/6 (18.1 overs)
Darcey Carter 62 (55); Sugandika Kumari 2/15 (4 overs)		Vishmi Gunaratne 49 (41); Abtaha Maqsood 3/18 (4 overs)

Sri Lanka won by 4 wickets
Karwan Sports Club Cricket Ground, Ajman
Umpires: Precious Smith (Ber) and Gayathri Venugopalan (Ind)
Player of the match: Vishmi Gunaratne (SL)

- Sri Lanka won the toss and elected to field.
- Harshitha Samarawickrama (SL) scored her 2,000th run in T20Is.

Match 6
13 November 2026
09:00 UTC+4
Scorecard

Ireland; 171/5 (20 overs)	v	United Arab Emirates; 110/8 (20 overs)
Gaby Lewis 71 (40); Janani Thirukkumari 2/20 (4 overs)		Esha Oza 51 (45); Cara Murray 2/21 (4 overs)

Ireland won by 61 runs
Seven Districts Sports Club, Ajman
Umpires: Dolly Rani (Ban) and Dedunu de Silva (SL)
Player of the match: Gaby Lewis (Ire)

- United Arab Emirates won the toss and elected to field.

Match 11
15 November 2026
13:15 UTC+4
Scorecard

United Arab Emirates; 138/4 (20 overs)	v	Scotland; 142/3 (18.1 overs)
Esha Oza 64* (52); Kirstie Gordon 2/24 (4 overs)		Kathryn Bryce 51* (36); Samaira Dharnidharka 2/22 (4 overs)

Scotland won by 7 wickets
Karwan Sports Club Cricket Ground, Ajman
Umpires: Ankita Guha (Ind) and Dedunu de Silva (SL)
Player of the match: Kathryn Bryce (Sco)

- United Arab Emirates won the toss and elected to bat.

Match 12
15 November 2026
13:15 UTC+4
Scorecard

Sri Lanka; 150/5 (20 overs)	v	Papua New Guinea; 83/9 (20 overs)
Vishmi Gunaratne 51 (48); Naoani Vare 3/17 (4 overs)		Pauke Siaka 25 (25); Sugandika Kumari 2/10 (3 overs)

Sri Lanka won by 67 runs
Seven Districts Sports Club, Ajman
Umpires: Dolly Rani (Ban) and Gayathri Venugopalan (Ind)
Player of the match: Vishmi Gunaratne (SL)

- Papua New Guinea won the toss and elected to field.

Match 15
16 November 2026
13:15 UTC+4
Scorecard

Ireland; 155/4 (20 overs)	v	Papua New Guinea; 110/8 (20 overs)
Gaby Lewis 60 (40); Henao Thomas 3/32 (4 overs)		Naoani Vare 39 (56); Cara Murray 3/12 (4 overs)

Ireland won by 45 runs
Karwan Sports Club Cricket Ground, Ajman
Umpires: Nimali Perera (SL) and Precious Smith (Ber)
Player of the match: Gaby Lewis (Ire)

- Papua New Guinea won the toss and elected to field.

Match 16
16 November 2026
13:15 UTC+4
Scorecard

United Arab Emirates; 106/8 (20 overs)	v	Sri Lanka; 107/5 (15 overs)
Esha Oza 42 (41); Kavisha Dilhari 3/22 (4 overs)		Vishmi Gunaratne 63* (45); Esha Oza 1/5 (2 overs)

Sri Lanka won by 5 wickets
Seven Districts Sports Club, Ajman
Umpires: Champa Chakma (Ban) and Dolly Rani (Ban)
Player of the match: Kavisha Dilhari (SL)

- United Arab Emirates won the toss and elected to bat.
- Kavisha Dilhari (SL) played her 100th match in T20Is.

Match 17
18 November 2026
09:00 UTC+4
Scorecard

United Arab Emirates; 134/7 (20 overs)	v	Papua New Guinea; 64 (18.1 overs)
Esha Oza 77 (64); Vicky Buruka 4/23 (3 overs)		Pauke Siaka 15 (20); Suraksha Kotte 4/15 (3.1 overs)

United Arab Emirates won by 70 runs
Karwan Sports Club Cricket Ground, Ajman
Umpires: Champa Chakma (Ban) and Ankita Guha (Ind)
Player of the match: Esha Oza (UAE)

- United Arab Emirates won the toss and elected to bat.
- Kevau Gabe (PNG) made her T20I debut.

Match 18
18 November 2026
09:00 UTC+4
Scorecard

Ireland; 71 (19.3 overs)	v	Scotland; 72/2 (8.3 overs)
Gaby Lewis 20 (22); Kirstie Gordon 4/4 (4 overs)		Darcey Carter 30 (31); Georgina Dempsey 1/8 (1 over)

Scotland won by 8 wickets
Seven Districts Sports Club, Ajman
Umpires: Nimali Perera (SL) and Dolly Rani (Ban)
Player of the match: Kirstie Gordon (Sco)

- Ireland won the toss and elected to bat.

=== Group B ===
Group B standings
Pos	Team	Pld	W	L	Pts	NRR	Qualification
1	Pakistan	4	3	1	6	0.942	Advanced to the Super Six
2	Netherlands	4	3	1	6	0.167	Advanced to the Super Six
3	Zimbabwe	4	2	2	4	−0.085	Advanced to the Super Six
4	Bangladesh	4	2	2	4	−0.198	
5	Thailand	4	0	4	0	−0.744	

Source: Cricinfo

Match 3
12 November 2026
13:15 UTC+4
Scorecard

Bangladesh; 108/9 (20 overs)	v	Pakistan; 112/2 (15.5 overs)
Nigar Sultana 27 (20); Tuba Hassan 3/26 (4 overs)		Sadaf Shamas 37 (37); Sobhana Mostary 1/4 (0.2 overs)

Pakistan won by 8 wickets
Karwan Sports Club Cricket Ground, Ajman
Umpires: Nimali Perera (SL) and Dedunu de Silva (SL)
Player of the match: Tuba Hassan (Pak)

- Bangladesh won the toss and elected to bat.
- Disha Biswas (Ban) made her T20I debut.

Match 4
12 November 2026
13:15 UTC+4
Scorecard

Thailand; 136/2 (20 overs)	v	Netherlands; 137/5 (19.3 overs)
Natthakan Chantham 55 (47); Heather Siegers 2/15 (4 overs)		Heather Siegers 42 (28); Sunida Chaturongrattana 2/26 (4 overs)

Netherlands won by 5 wickets
Seven Districts Sports Club, Ajman
Umpires: Ankita Guha (Ind) and Dolly Rani (Ban)
Player of the match: Heather Siegers (Ned)

- Thailand won the toss and elected to bat.
- Sarnsiree Plant (Tha) made her T20I debut.

Match 7
13 November 2026
13:15 UTC+4
Scorecard

Pakistan; 180/2 (20 overs)	v	Thailand; 156/7 (20 overs)
Ayesha Zafar 59* (26); Suleeporn Laomi 1/28 (4 overs)		Natthakan Chantham 43 (24); Tasmia Rubab 4/18 (3 overs)

Pakistan won by 24 runs
Karwan Sports Club Cricket Ground, Ajman
Umpires: Champa Chakma (Ban) and Gayathri Venugopalan (Ind)
Player of the match: Ayesha Zafar (Pak)

- Pakistan won the toss and elected to bat.

Match 8
13 November 2026
13:15 UTC+4
Scorecard

Zimbabwe; 131/7 (20 overs)	v	Bangladesh; 132/1 (17.3 overs)
Chipo Mugeri-Tiripano 40 (30); Rabeya Khan 3/26 (4 overs)		Dilara Akter 68* (49); Michelle Mavunga 1/24 (4 overs)

Bangladesh won by 9 wickets
Seven Districts Sports Club, Ajman
Umpires: Ankita Guha (Ind) and Nimali Perera (SL)
Player of the match: Dilara Akter (Ban)

- Zimbabwe won the toss and elected to bat.

Match 9
15 November 2026
09:00 UTC+4
Scorecard

Zimbabwe; 110/5 (20 overs)	v	Thailand; 82 (16.4 overs)
Kelis Ndhlovu 56 (49); Phannita Maya 2/20 (4 overs)		Phannita Maya 19 (15); Christine Mutasa 6/10 (4 overs)

Zimbabwe won by 28 runs
Karwan Sports Club Cricket Ground, Ajman
Umpires: Dolly Rani (Ban) and Precious Smith (Ber)
Player of the match: Christine Mutasa (Zim)

- Thailand won the toss and elected to field.
- Christine Mutasa (Zim) took her maiden five-wicket haul in T20Is.

Match 10
15 November 2026
09:00 UTC+4
Scorecard

Pakistan; 126/7 (20 overs)	v	Netherlands; 127/2 (14.5 overs)
Gull Feroza 23* (21); Frederique Overdijk 3/18 (3 overs)		Babette de Leede 39 (23); Tuba Hassan 2/14 (3 overs)

Netherlands won by 8 wickets
Seven Districts Sports Club, Ajman
Umpires: Champa Chakma (Ban) and Nimali Perera (SL)
Player of the match: Heather Siegers (Ned)

- Netherlands won the toss and elected to field.

Match 13
16 November 2026
09:00 UTC+4
Scorecard

Bangladesh; 129/8 (20 overs)	v	Netherlands; 131/5 (19.4 overs)
Dilara Akter 51 (46); Heather Siegers 4/21 (4 overs)		Sterre Kalis 68* (50); Rabeya Khan 2/22 (4 overs)

Netherlands won by 5 wickets
Karwan Sports Club Cricket Ground, Ajman
Umpires: Ankita Guha (Ind) and Precious Smith (Ber)
Player of the match: Sterre Kalis (Ned)

- Netherlands won the toss and elected to field.

Match 14
16 November 2026
09:00 UTC+4
Scorecard

Pakistan; 150/6 (20 overs)	v	Zimbabwe; 99/8 (20 overs)
Muneeba Ali 51 (49); Christine Mutasa 2/30 (4 overs)		Chipo Mugeri-Tiripano 31 (34); Nashra Sandhu 3/8 (3 overs)

Pakistan won by 51 runs
Seven Districts Sports Club, Ajman
Umpires: Dedunu de Silva (SL) and Gayathri Venugopalan (Ind)
Player of the match: Muneeba Ali (Pak)

- Zimbabwe won the toss and elected to field.

Match 19
18 November 2026
13:15 UTC+4
Scorecard

Zimbabwe; 160/2 (20 overs)	v	Netherlands; 127/7 (20 overs)
Kelis Ndhlovu 74 (45); Frederique Overdijk 1/26 (3 overs)		Robine Rijke 52 (51); Christine Mutasa 3/18 (4 overs)

Zimbabwe won by 33 runs
Karwan Sports Club Cricket Ground, Ajman
Umpires: Nimali Perera (SL) and Gayathri Venugopalan (Ind)
Player of the match: Kelis Ndhlovu (Zim)

- Zimbabwe won the toss and elected to bat.

Match 20
18 November 2026
13:15 UTC+4
Scorecard

Bangladesh; 132/6 (20 overs)	v	Thailand; 129/5 (20 overs)
Nigar Sultana 45 (36); Chanida Sutthiruang 2/11 (2 overs)		Nannapat Koncharoenkai 57 (51); Sanjida Akter Meghla 2/24 (4 overs)

Bangladesh won by 3 runs
Seven Districts Sports Club, Ajman
Umpires: Dedunu de Silva (SL) and Precious Smith (Ber)
Player of the match: Nigar Sultana (Ban)

- Thailand won the toss and elected to field.

== Super Six ==
Super Six standings
Pos	Team	Pld	W	L	NR	Pts	NRR	Qualification
1	Sri Lanka	4	4	0	0	8	2.778	Advance to the final
2	Pakistan	4	2	2	0	4	−0.141	Advance to the final
3	Ireland	4	2	2	0	4	−1.061	
4	Netherlands	4	2	2	0	4	−1.141	
5	Scotland	4	1	3	0	2	0.477	
6	Zimbabwe	4	1	3	0	2	−0.975	

Updated to match(es) played on 22 November 2026. Source: Cricinfo

Match 21
20 November 2026
09:00 UTC+4
Scorecard

Scotland; 154/7 (20 overs)	v	Netherlands; 155/3 (19.4 overs)
Kathryn Bryce 34 (31); Caroline de Lange 2/19 (4 overs)		Sterre Kalis 52* (27); Kathryn Bryce 1/32 (4 overs)

Netherlands won by 7 wickets
Karwan Sports Club Cricket Ground, Ajman
Umpires: Dolly Rani (Ban) and Gayathri Venugopalan (Ind)
Player of the match: Sterre Kalis (Ned)

- Netherlands won the toss and elected to field.

Match 22
20 November 2026
09:00 UTC+4
Scorecard

Zimbabwe; 68 (19.1 overs)	v	Sri Lanka; 69/1 (11.3 overs)
Kelis Ndhlovu 19 (24); Kavisha Dilhari 3/8 (4 overs)		Vishmi Gunaratne 39* (35); Beloved Biza 1/7 (1.3 overs)

Sri Lanka won by 9 wickets
Seven Districts Sports Club, Ajman
Umpires: Champa Chakma (Ban) and Ankita Guha (Ind)
Player of the match: Kavisha Dilhari (SL)

- Zimbabwe won the toss and elected to bat.

Match 23
20 November 2026
13:15 UTC+4
Scorecard

Pakistan; 107 (18.4 overs)	v	Ireland; 111/1 (13.2 overs)
Omaima Sohail 35 (30); Louise Little 3/21 (3.4 overs)		Gaby Lewis 71 (46); Omaima Sohail 1/14 (2 overs)

Ireland won by 9 wickets
Karwan Sports Club Cricket Ground, Ajman
Umpires: Nimali Perera (SL) and Dedunu de Silva (SL)
Player of the match: Gaby Lewis (Ire)

- Pakistan won the toss and elected to bat.

Match 24
22 November 2026
09:00 UTC+4
Scorecard

Netherlands; 57 (17.4 overs)	v	Sri Lanka; 58/1 (7.2 overs)
Sterre Kalis 26 (40); Kavisha Dilhari 2/8 (4 overs)		Vishmi Gunaratne 29* (23); Iris Zwilling 1/16 (3 overs)

Sri Lanka won by 9 wickets
Karwan Sports Club Cricket Ground, Ajman
Umpires: Precious Smith (Ber) and Gayathri Venugopalan (Ind)
Player of the match: Kavisha Dilhari (SL)

- Sri Lanka won the toss and elected to field.

Match 25
22 November 2026
09:00 UTC+4
Scorecard

Scotland; 124/5 (20 overs)	v	Pakistan; 128/1 (17.1 overs)
Kathryn Bryce 53 (36); Umm-e-Hani 2/19 (3 overs)		Muneeba Ali 59* (48); Hannah Rainey 1/22 (3.1 overs)

Pakistan won by 9 wickets
Seven Districts Sports Club, Ajman
Umpires: Ankita Guha (Ind) and Dedunu de Silva (SL)
Player of the match: Muneeba Ali (Pak)

- Pakistan won the toss and elected to field.

Match 26
22 November 2026
13:15 UTC+4
Scorecard

Zimbabwe; 120/9 (20 overs)	v	Ireland; 121/7 (19.4 overs)
Nyasha Gwanzura 38 (30); Kia McCartney 3/27 (4 overs)		Amy Hunter 52 (47); Nyasha Gwanzura 3/16 (2 overs)

Ireland won by 3 wickets
Seven Districts Sports Club, Ajman
Umpires: Champa Chakma (Ban) and Nimali Perera (SL)
Player of the match: Amy Hunter (Ire)

- Zimbabwe won the toss and elected to bat.
- Zara Craig (Ire) made her T20I debut.

Match 27
23 November 2026
09:00 UTC+4
Scorecard

Pakistan	v	Sri Lanka

Karwan Sports Club Cricket Ground, Ajman

Match 28
23 November 2026
13:15 UTC+4
Scorecard

Scotland	v	Zimbabwe

Karwan Sports Club Cricket Ground, Ajman

Match 29
23 November 2026
13:15 UTC+4
Scorecard

Ireland	v	Netherlands

Seven Districts Sports Club, Ajman

== Final ==
Final
25 November 2026
09:00 UTC+4
Scorecard

Sri Lanka	v	TBD

Karwan Sports Club Cricket Ground, Ajman

== Statistics ==
As of 22 November 2026

Most runs
Runs	Player	Team	Inns.	Avg.
284	Vishmi Gunaratne	Sri Lanka	6	142.00
234	Esha Oza	United Arab Emirates	4	78.00
227	Gaby Lewis	Ireland	6	37.83
217	Sterre Kalis	Netherlands	6	108.50
214	Muneeba Ali	Pakistan	6	71.33

Most wickets
Wickets	Player	Team	Inns.	Econ
13	Kavisha Dilhari	Sri Lanka	6	4.43
12	Christina Mutasa	Zimbabwe	6	4.79
10	Sathya Sandeepani	Sri Lanka	6	3.90
10	Cara Murray	Ireland	6	5.76
8	Nimasha Meepage	Sri Lanka	5	3.55
8	Kirstie Gordon	Scotland	6	5.00
