= 2023 ACC Women's T20 Emerging Teams Asia Cup =

Cricket tournament

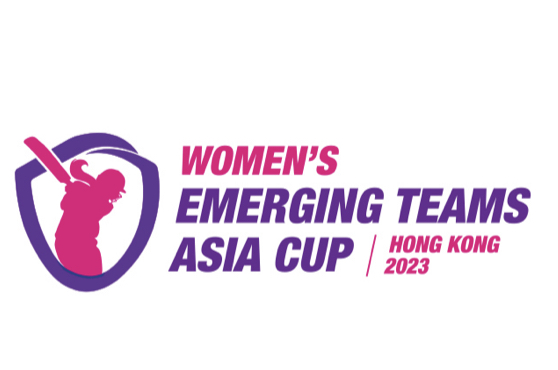
- Dates: 12 – 21 June 2023
- Administrator: Asian Cricket Council
- Cricket format: 20 over, Twenty20, Twenty20 International
- Tournament format(s): Group round-robin and knockout
- Host: Hong Kong
- Champions: India A (1st title)
- Runners-up: Bangladesh A
- Participants: 8
- Matches: 15
- Player of the series: (India) Shreyanka Patil
- Most runs: (Bangladesh) Murshida Khatun (59)
- Most wickets: (India) Shreyanka Patil (9)

The 2023 ACC Women's T20 Emerging Teams Asia Cup was the inaugural edition of the ACC Women's T20 Emerging Teams Asia Cup played in Hong Kong in June 2023, with all the matches held at the Mission Road Ground in Kowloon. Eight teams took part in the tournament, including the A teams of four nations with ODI status and the next four top associate teams. The tournament was organized by the Asian Cricket Council (ACC).

7 of the scheduled 12 matches in the first round of the tournament were rained out. Only two teams – Malaysia and United Arab Emirates – were able to play more than one match, and the match between those two teams was also reduced to 5 overs. One of the semi-finals was also rained out, meaning that Bangladesh A and Pakistan A were the only other teams that had played more than one match going into the final. India A won the tournament after defeating Bangladesh A by 31 runs in the final.

== Participating teams ==
The following eight teams participated in the tournament. Thailand withdrew shortly before the tournament began due to visa issues, and were replaced by Nepal.

- Bangladesh A
- Hong Kong
- India A
- Malaysia
- Nepal
- Pakistan A
- Sri Lanka A
- United Arab Emirates

== Squads ==
Bangladesh A	Hong Kong	India A	Malaysia
Lata Mondal (c); Sobhana Mostary (vc); Dilara Akter (wk); Marufa Akter; Nahida Akter; Shorna Akter; Disha Biswas; Rubya Haider (wk); Rabeya Khan; Murshida Khatun; Sultana Khatun; Sanjida Akter Meghla; Shathi Rani; Fariha Trisna	Kary Chan (c); Maryam Bibi; Betty Chan; Shing Chan; Hiu Ying Cheung (wk); Mariko Hill; Emma Lai; Marina Lamplough; Natasha Miles; Iqra Sahar; Shanzeen Shahzad (wk); Alison Siu; Yee Shan To; Ruchitha Venkatesh	Shweta Sehrawat (c); Soumya Tiwari (vc); Kanika Ahuja; Anusha Bareddy; Uma Chetry (wk); Parshavi Chopra; Kashvee Gautam; Mannat Kashyap; Muskan Malik; Madiwala Mamatha (wk); Shreyanka Patil; Titas Sadhu; Gongadi Trisha; Dinesh Vrinda; Soppadhandi Yashasri	Mas Elysa (c); Ainna Hamizah Hashim (vc); Musfirah Nur Ainaa; Nik Nur Atiela; Christina Baret (wk); Aisya Eleesa; Mahirah Izzati Ismail; Wan Julia (wk); Aina Najwa (wk); Nur Arianna Natsya; Amalin Sorfina; Suabika Manivannan; Nur Dania Syuhada; Yusrina Yaakop
Nepal	Pakistan A	Sri Lanka A	United Arab Emirates
Rubina Chhetry (c); Indu Barma; Apsari Begam; Ishwori Bist; Kabita Joshi; Asmina Karmacharya; Samjhana Khadka; Saraswati Kumari; Kabita Kunwar; Sita Rana Magar; Kritika Marasini; Jyoti Pandey (wk); Bindu Rawal; Kajal Shrestha (wk)	Fatima Sana (c); Najiha Alvi (wk); Yusra Amir; Lubna Behram; Eyman Fatima; Gull Feroza; Tuba Hassan; Anosha Nasir; Natalia Pervaiz; Gull Rukh; Syeda Aroob Shah; Sadaf Shamas; Umm-e-Hani; Shawaal Zulfiqar	Sathya Sandeepani (c); Malsha Shehani (vc); Imesha Dulani; Vishmi Gunaratne; Nimasha Meepage; Madushika Methtananda; Sachini Nisansala; Kaushini Nuthyangana (wk); Nilakshana Sandamini; Tharika Sewwandi; Rashmi Silva; Umesha Thimashini; Dewmi Vihanga; Piumi Badalge	Chaya Mughal (c, wk); Esha Oza (vc, wk); Judit Cleetus (wk); Samaira Dharnidharka; Kavisha Egodage; Siya Gokhale; Vaishnave Mahesh; Indhuja Nandakumar; Avanee Patil; Rinitha Rajith; Theertha Satish (wk); Khushi Sharma; Sanchin Singh (wk); Archara Supriya

== Group stage ==
=== Group A ===
==== Points table ====
Pos	Team	Pld	W	L	NR	Pts	NRR
1	India A	3	1	0	2	4	5.425
2	Pakistan A	3	1	0	2	4	0.450
3	Nepal	3	0	1	2	2	−0.450
4	Hong Kong	3	0	1	2	2	−5.425

Source: ESPNcricinfo

Advanced to the knockout stage

==== Fixtures ====
13 June 2023
09:00
Scorecard

Pakistan A 87 (19.2 overs)	v	Nepal; 78/6 (20 overs)
Shawaal Zulfiqar 28 (36); Indu Barma 3/6 (3 overs)		Kabita Kunwar 20 (32); Syeda Aroob Shah 2/16 (4 overs)

Pakistan A won by 9 runs
Mission Road Ground, Kowloon
Umpires: Narayanan Janani (Ind) and Hemangi Yerzal (UAE)
Player of the match: Kabita Kunwar (Nep)

- Nepal won the toss and elected to field.

13 June 2023
13:30
Scorecard

Hong Kong; 34 (14 overs)	v	India A 38/1 (5.2 overs)
Mariko Hill 14 (19); Shreyanka Patil 5/2 (3 overs)		Gongadi Trisha 19 (13); Betty Chan 1/15 (2 overs)

India A won by 9 wickets
Mission Road Ground, Kowloon
Umpires: Afia Amin (Pak) and Nur Hjrah (Mas)
Player of the match: Shreyanka Patil (India A)

- India A won the toss and elected to field.

15 June 2023
09:00
Scorecard

Hong Kong	v	Pakistan A

Match abandoned
Mission Road Ground, Kowloon
Umpires: Narayanan Janani (Ind) and Vrinda Rathi (Ind)

- No toss.
- No play was possible due to rain.

15 June 2023
13:30
Scorecard

India A	v	Nepal

Match abandoned
Mission Road Ground, Kowloon
Umpires: Humaira Farah (Pak) and Saleema Imtiaz (Pak)

- No toss.
- No play was possible due to rain.

17 June 2023
09:00
Scorecard

Hong Kong	v	Nepal

Match abandoned
Mission Road Ground, Kowloon
Umpires: Humaira Farah (Pak) and Vrinda Rathi (Ind)

- No toss.
- No play was possible due to rain.

17 June 2023
13:30
Scorecard

India A	v	Pakistan A

Match abandoned
Mission Road Ground, Kowloon
Umpires: Dedunu Silva (SL) and Hemangi Yerzal (UAE)

- No toss.
- No play was possible due to rain.

=== Group B ===
==== Points table ====
Pos	Team	Pld	W	L	NR	Pts	NRR
1	Bangladesh A	3	1	0	2	4	4.850
2	Sri Lanka A	3	1	0	2	4	0.090
3	United Arab Emirates	3	1	1	1	3	0.000
4	Malaysia	3	0	2	1	1	−3.969

Source: ESPNcricinfo

Advanced to the knockout stage

==== Fixtures ====
12 June 2023
09:00
Scorecard

United Arab Emirates; 95 (19.3 overs)	v	Sri Lanka A 96/7 (19.5 overs)
Esha Oza 39 (30); Madushika Methtananda 4/16 (3.3 overs)		Vishmi Gunaratne 21 (32); Esha Oza 2/10 (4 overs)

Sri Lanka A won by 3 wickets
Mission Road Ground, Kowloon
Umpires: Nur Hijrah (Mas) and Narayanan Janani (Ind)
Player of the match: Madushika Methtananda (Sri Lanka A)

- United Arab Emirates won the toss and elected to bat.

12 June 2023
13:30
Scorecard

Bangladesh A 148/6 (20 overs)	v	Malaysia; 51/8 (20 overs)
Murshida Khatun 57* (44); Aisya Eleesa 2/20 (4 overs)		Ainna Hamizah Hashim 13* (31); Rabeya Khan 2/7 (3 overs)

Bangladesh A won by 97 runs
Mission Road Ground, Kowloon
Umpires: Saleema Imtiaz (Pak) and Gayathri Venugopalan (Ind)
Player of the match: Murshida Khatun (Bangladesh A)

- Bangladesh A won the toss and elected to bat.

14 June 2023
09:00
Scorecard

Bangladesh A	v	Sri Lanka A

Match abandoned
Mission Road Ground, Kowloon
Umpires: Afia Amin (Pak) and Gayathri Venugopalan (Ind)

- No toss.
- No play was possible due to rain.

14 June 2023
13:30
Scorecard

Malaysia; 34/6 (5 overs)	v	United Arab Emirates; 35/5 (4.5 overs)
Yusrina Yaakop 9 (5); Vaishnave Mahesh 3/10 (2 overs)		Chaya Mughal 8* (5); Mahirah Izzati Ismail 3/11 (2 overs)

United Arab Emirates won by 5 wickets
Mission Road Ground, Kowloon
Umpires: Nimali Perera (SL) and Dedunu Silva (SL)
Player of the match: Vaishnave Mahesh (UAE)

- United Arab Emirates won the toss and elected to field.
- The match was reduced to 5 overs per side due to rain.

16 June 2023
09:00
Scorecard

Bangladesh A	v	United Arab Emirates

Match abandoned
Mission Road Ground, Kowloon
Umpires: Nimali Perera (SL) and Hemangi Yerzal (UAE)

- No toss.
- No play was possible due to rain.

16 June 2023
13:30
Scorecard

Malaysia	v	Sri Lanka A

Match abandoned
Mission Road Ground, Kowloon
Umpires: Saleema Imtiaz (Pak) and Shathira Jakir (Ban)

- No toss.
- No play was possible due to rain.

== Knockout stage ==
=== Bracket ===
Semi-finals
A1	India A
B2	Sri Lanka A
B1	Bangladesh A	59/7 (9)
A2	Pakistan A	53/4 (9)

Final
A1	India A	127/7 (20)
B1	Bangladesh A	96 (19.2)

=== Semi-finals ===
==== 1st semi-final ====
19–20 June 2023
09:00
Scorecard

India A	v	Sri Lanka A

Match abandoned
Mission Road Ground, Kowloon
Umpires: Saleema Imtiaz (Pak) and Hemangi Yerzal (UAE)

- No toss.
- No play was possible on the scheduled date due to rain. Reserve day was used.
- No play was possible in reserved due to rain.
- India A advanced to the final on the basis of finishing higher in the group stage standings.

==== 2nd semi-final ====
19–20 June 2023
13:30
Scorecard

Bangladesh A 59/7 (9 overs)	v	Pakistan A 53/4 (9 overs)
Nahida Akter 21 (16); Fatima Sana 3/10 (2 overs)		Eyman Fatima 18 (15); Rabeya Khan 2/13 (2 overs)

Bangladesh A won by 6 runs
Mission Road Ground, Kowloon
Umpires: Nimali Perera (SL) and Gayathri Venugopalan (Ind)
Player of the match: Nahida Akter (Bangladesh A)

- Bangladesh A won the toss and elected to bat.
- No play was possible on the scheduled date due to rain. Reserve day was used.
- The match was reduced to 9 overs per side due to rain.

=== Final ===
21 June 2023
11:30
Scorecard

India A 127/7 (20 overs)	v	Bangladesh A 96 (19.2 overs)
Dinesh Vrinda 36 (29); Nahida Akter 2/13 (4 overs)		Nahida Akter 17* (22); Shreyanka Patil 4/13 (4 overs)

India A won by 31 runs
Mission Road Ground, Kowloon
Umpires: Nimali Perera (SL) and Hemangi Yerzal (UAE)
Player of the match: Kanika Ahuja (India A)

- India A won the toss and elected to bat.
