= Cricket in Sri Lanka =

Sri Lankan Cricket
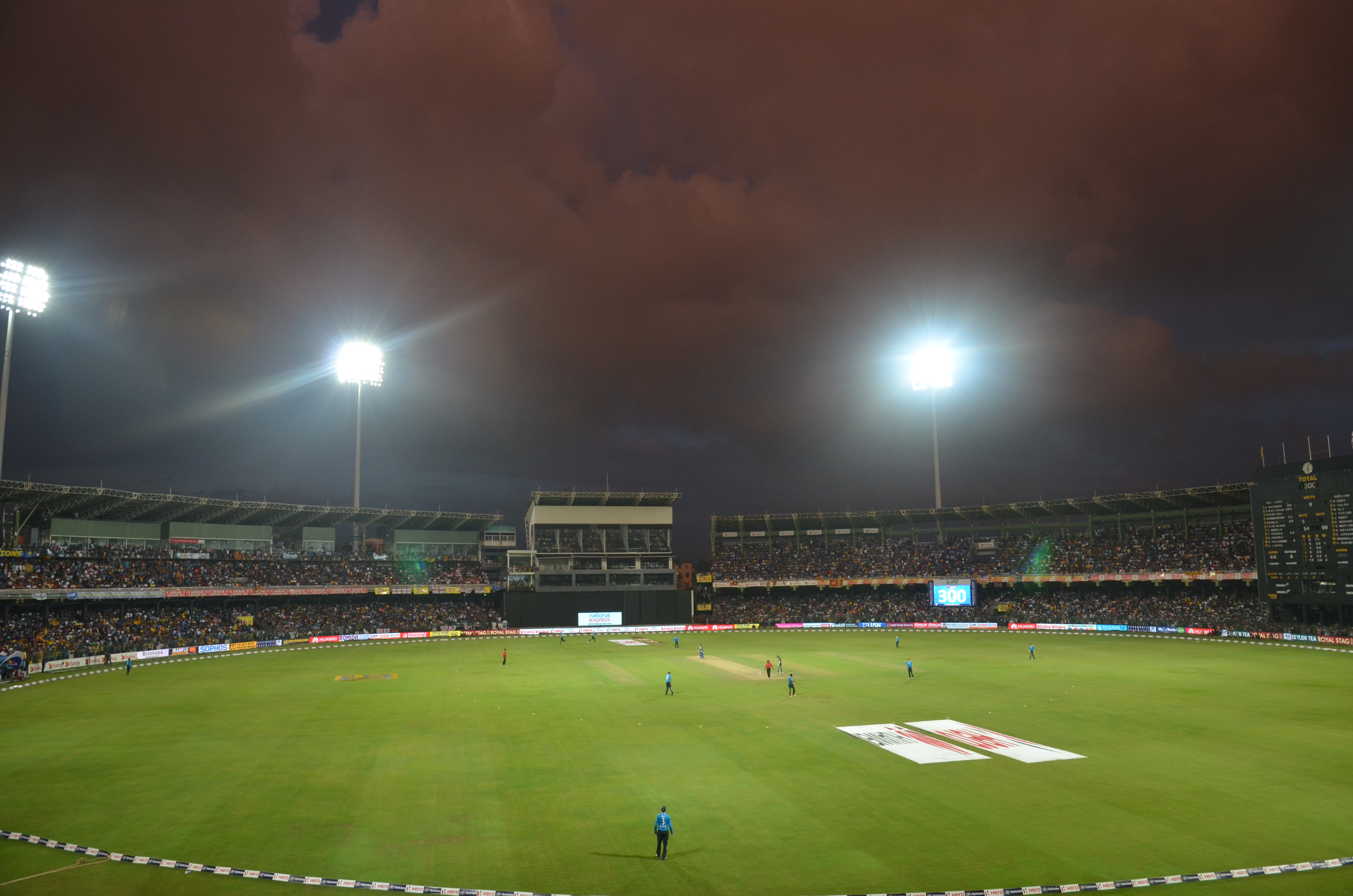
- R. Premadasa Stadium night view
- Country: Sri Lanka
- Governing body: Sri Lanka Cricket
- National teams: Sri Lankan Men; Sri Lankan Women; Sri Lankan U-19 Men; Sri Lankan U-19 Women; Sri Lankan A Men; Sri Lankan A Women
- Nickname: Lankan Lions
- Clubs: 5 (LPL)

National competitions
- List: First Class Cricket; National Super League 4-Day Tournament; Major League Tournament; List A Cricket; National Super League Limited Over Tournament; Major Clubs Limited Over Tournament; Sri Lanka Women's Division One Tournament; T20 Cricket; National Super League T20; Major Clubs T20 Tournament

Club competitions
- List: Lanka Premier League

International competitions
- List: Men’s national team; ICC World Test Championship; Cricket World Cup: Champions (1996); ICC Men's T20 World Cup: Champions (2014); ICC Champions Trophy: Champions (2002); Asia Cup: Champions (1986, 1997, 2004, 2008, 2014, 2022); Commonwealth Games: 4th (1998); Asian Games: Gold Medal (2014); Men’s U-19 national team; Under-19 Cricket World Cup: Runners-up (2000); ACC Under-19 Asia Cup: Runners-up (1989, 2003, 2016, 2018, 2021); Sri Lanka A cricket team; ACC Emerging Teams Asia Cup: Champions (2017, 2018); Women's national team; ICC Women's Cricket World Cup: Quarter-final (1997); ICC Women's T20 World Cup; Women's Asia Cup : Champions (2024); Commonwealth Games: Group Stage (2022); Asian Games: Siver Medal (2022); Women's U-19 national team; Under-19 Women's T20 World Cup: Super 6 (2023); ACC Under-19 Women's T20 Asia Cup: Super 4 (2024); Sri Lanka A women's cricket team; ACC Women's T20 Emerging Teams Asia Cup: Champions (2023)

Sri Lanka is one of the twelve nations that take part in Test cricket and one of the six nations that has won a cricket World Cup. Cricket is played at professional, semi-professional and recreational levels in the country and international cricket matches are watched with interest by a large proportion of the population.

Sri Lanka (then called Ceylon) was occupied by the British in 1796 and became a British colony in 1815. As in all places that the British arrived in large numbers, cricket soon followed and it is reasonable to assume that the game was first played on the island by 1800. The earliest definite mention of cricket in Ceylon was a report in the Colombo Journal on 5 September 1832 which called for the formation of a cricket club. The Colombo Cricket Club was formed soon afterwards and matches began in November 1832. Since then, the sport has grown domestically with major events such as the Premier Trophy (dating from 1938), now known as the Major League Tournament (Sri Lanka) and the Premier Limited Overs Tournament (starting 1988–89), now known as the Major Clubs Limited Over Tournament. Sri Lanka's one day international debut came in the 1975 Cricket World Cup. The country was awarded Test cricket status by the International Cricket Council in 1981.

== History ==
Cricket was brought to the nation when it was colonized by the British. As everywhere that the British arrived in numbers, cricket soon followed and it is reasonable to assume that the game was first played on the island by 1800. The earliest definite mention of cricket in Ceylon was a report in the Colombo Journal on 5 September 1832 which called for the formation of a cricket club. The Colombo Cricket Club was formed soon afterwards and matches began in November 1833 when it played against the 97th Regiment.

=== Early years ===
The first recorded match dates back to 1832 as reported in The Colombo Journal. By the 1880s a national team, the Ceylon national cricket team, was formed which began playing first-class cricket by the 1920s. The Ceylon national cricket team achieved Associate Member status of the International Cricket Council in 1965. Renamed Sri Lanka in 1972, the national team first competed in top-level international cricket in 1975, when they were defeated by nine wickets by the West Indies during the 1975 Cricket World Cup at Old Trafford, England.

=== Underdog Era ===
Sri Lanka was awarded Test cricket status in 1981 by the International Cricket Conference. They played their first Test match against England at P. Saravanamuttu Stadium, Colombo, on 17 February 1982. Bandula Warnapura was the captain for Sri Lanka in that match, which England won by 7 wickets. After Sri Lanka was awarded Test status on 21 July 1981 as eighth Test playing nation, they had to wait until 6 September 1985, where Sri Lanka recorded their first Test win by beating India, in the second match of the series by 149 runs at the Paikiasothy Saravanamuttu Stadium, Colombo. They have also won the 2001-02 Asian Test Championship, defeating Pakistan in the final by an innings and 175 runs.

Sri Lanka won their first Test match under the leadership of Duleep Mendis on 11 September 1985 against India, winning by 149 runs at P. Saravanamuttu Stadium. Eventually they won the three-match Test series, 1–0. Sri Lanka had to wait more than seven years for their next series victory, which came against New Zealand in December 1992, when they won the two-match series 1–0. This was immediately followed by a one-wicket victory against England in a one-Test series.

Two years later, on 15 March 1995, Sri Lanka won their first overseas Test match under the leadership of Arjuna Ranatunga against New Zealand, when they beat them by 241 runs at Napier. This win also resulted in their first overseas Test series victory, 1–0. Their next series too was an overseas series, against Pakistan, and that one too resulted in Sri Lankan victory.

Sri Lanka registered their first ODI win against India at Old Trafford, England on 16 June 1979.

=== Modern era ===
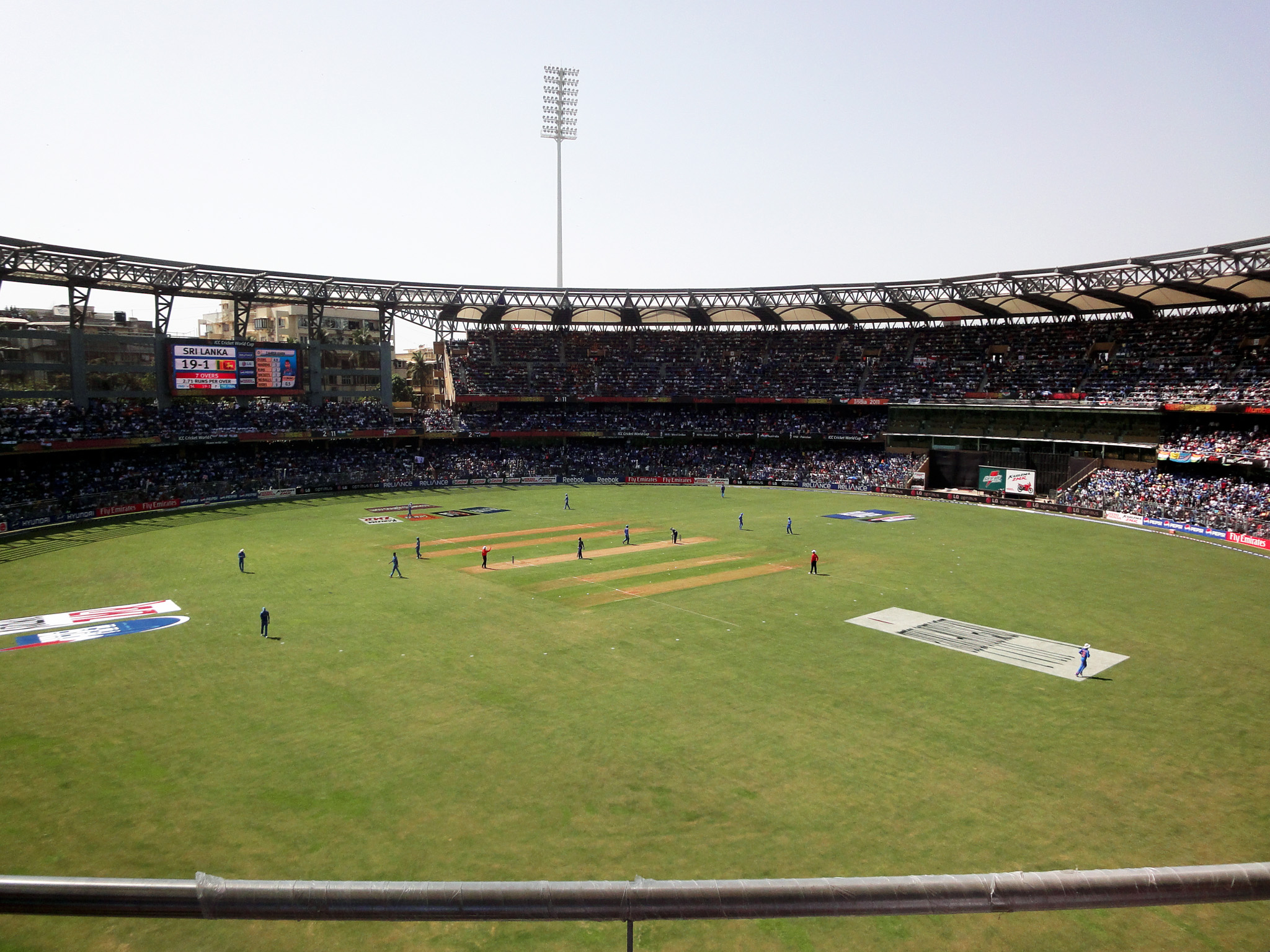
The 2011 Cricket World Cup Final, Sri Lankan team reached their third final in the Cricket World Cups

After many years of underdog status, Sri Lanka finally entered the limelight of the cricketing world after winning the 1996 Cricket World Cup under the captaincy of Arjuna Ranatunga. Meanwhile, they revolutionized modern day batting strategies by rapid scoring during the first 15 overs. Sri Lanka later became the co-champions in 2002 ICC Champions Trophy and also became six times Asian champions in 1986, 1997, 2004, 2008, 2014 and 2022.

On 11 September 1999, under the leadership of Sanath Jayasuriya, Sri Lanka won their first Test match against Australia, when they beat them by six wickets at Asgiriya Stadium, Kandy. Eventually they won the three-match Test series, 1–0.

On 14 June 2000, Sri Lanka played their 100th Test match. It was against Pakistan, at SSC, Colombo, under the leadership of Sanath Jayasuriya. Pakistan won by 5 wickets.

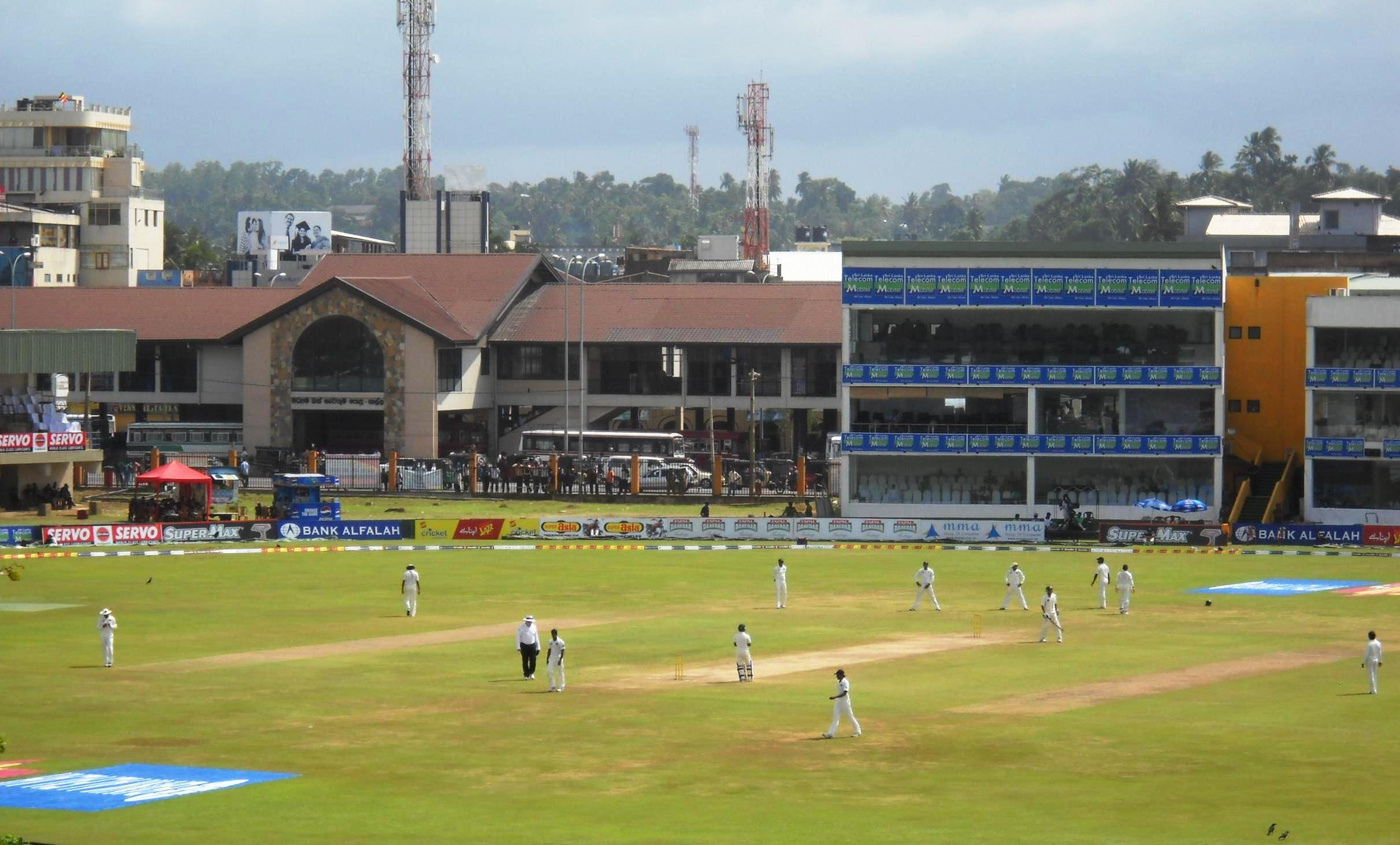
The first Test match of Pakistan's 2012 Sri Lankan tour, Sri Lanka went on to win the match

On 4 August 2016, they played their 250th Test match when they played Australia in Galle. They won the match by 229 runs, and also won the Warne-Muralidharan trophy for the first time since its inception. On 17 August 2016, under the leadership of Angelo Mathews, Sri Lanka whitewashed Australia 3-0 for the first time in Test cricket. Until 2017, Sri Lanka had whitewashed Zimbabwe three times, Bangladesh once and Australia once in Test cricket.

Sri Lanka played their first day-night Test match on 6 October 2017 against Pakistan at Dubai International Cricket Stadium. Under the captaincy of Dinesh Chandimal, Sri Lanka convincingly won the match by 68 runs and sweep the series 2–0. In the match, Dimuth Karunaratne became the first Sri Lankan to score a fifty, a century and a 150 in a day-night Test. Lahiru Gamage, who debut in the match became the first Sri Lankan to take a wicket in a day-night Test, whereas Dilruwan Perera became the first Sri Lankan to take a five-wicket haul in a day-night Test.

Sri Lanka played their first Twenty20 International (T20I) match at the Rose Bowl, on 15 June 2006, against England, winning the match by 2 runs. In 2014, they won the 2014 ICC World Twenty20, defeating India by 6 wickets.

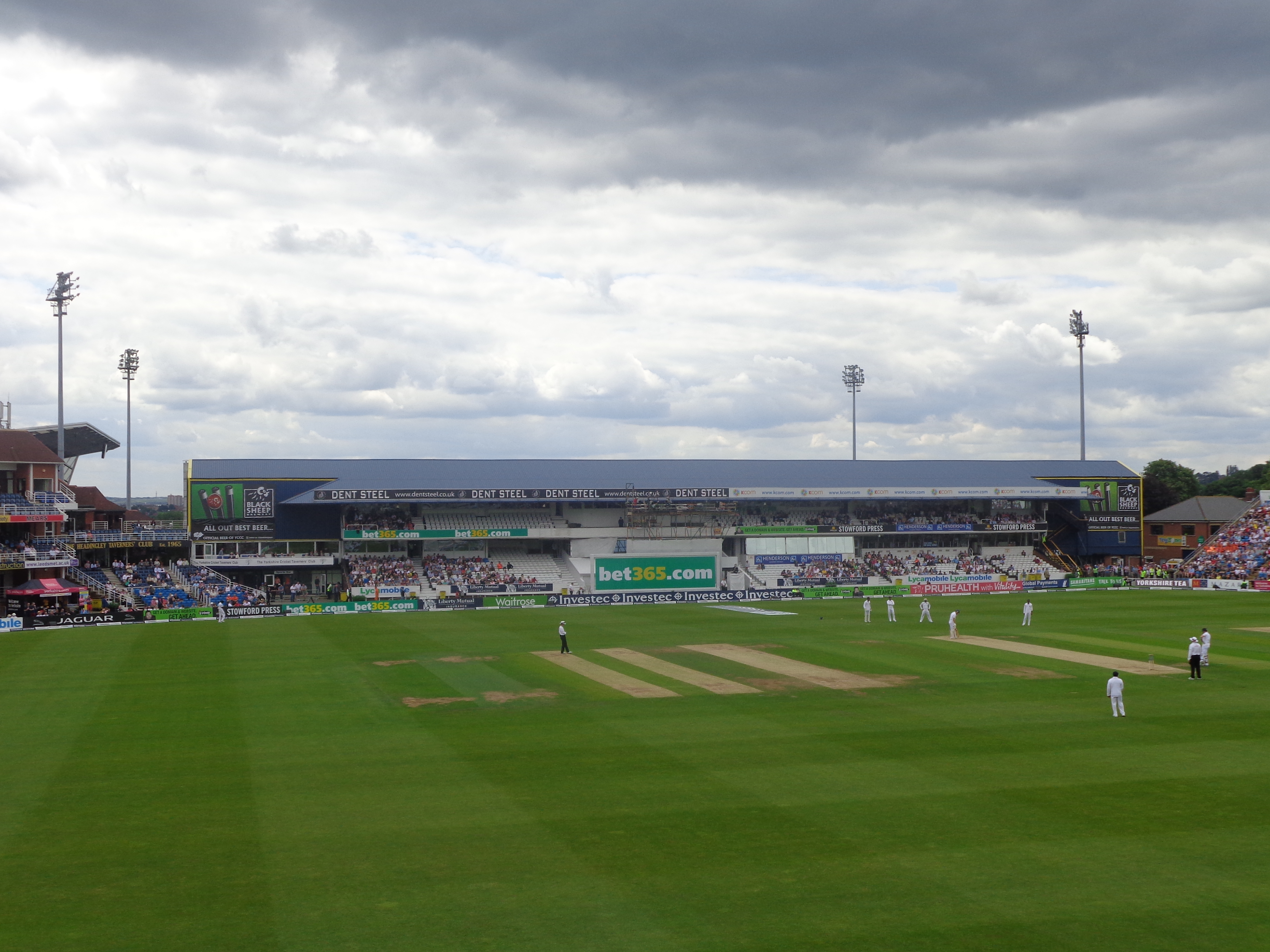
The second Test match of the 2014 Sri Lanka's England tour, Sri Lanka won the match, despite trailing in the first inning by over 100 runs.

As of July 2018, Sri Lanka have faced nine teams in Test cricket, only recent Test nations Afghanistan and Ireland are missing from their list of opponents, with their most frequent opponent being Pakistan, playing 55 matches against them. Sri Lanka has registered more wins against Pakistan and Bangladesh than any other team, with 14. In ODI matches, Sri Lanka have played against 17 teams; they have played against India most frequently, with a winning percentage of 39.49 in 149 matches. Within usual major ODI nations, Sri Lanka have defeated England on 34 occasions, which is their best record in ODIs. The team have competed against 13 countries in T20Is, and have played 15 matches against New Zealand. Sri Lanka have defeated Australia and West Indies 6 occasions each. Sri Lanka was the best T20I team in the world, where they ranked number one in more than 32 months, and reached World Twenty20 final in three times.

As of 29 January 2024, Sri Lanka have played 313 Test matches; they have won 100 matches, lost 121 matches, and 92 matches were drawn. As of 10 July 2018, Sri Lanka have played 816 ODI matches, winning 376 matches and losing 399; they also tied 5 matches, whilst 36 had no result. As of 10 July 2018, Sri Lanka have played 108 T20I matches and won 54 of them; 52 were lost and 1 tied and 1 no result match as well.

From 8 July 2017 to 23 October 2017, Sri Lanka lost twelve consecutive ODI matches, which is their second-longest losing run in ODIs. In the meantime, Sri Lanka involved 5-0 whitewash in three times against South Africa, India and Pakistan in 2017. And a 3-0 whitewash against the West Indies 3 years later (2020).

On 9 September 2019, Sri Lanka won the T20I series 3–0 against Pakistan in their home under Dasun Shanaka's captaincy. It was the first time that Sri Lanka whitewashed Pakistan in a T20I series. In July 2021, Sri Lanka won T20I series against India 2–1, recording their first ever bilateral T20I series win against India.

On 4 March 2022, Sri Lanka played their 300th Test match in Mohali against India. Sri Lanka lost the match by an innings and 222 runs. Amid political turmoil back home, Sri Lanka won the 2022 Asia Cup, defeating Pakistan in the final on 11 September 2022. On 28 April 2023, Sri Lanka won their 100th Test match against Ireland at Galle. They won the test series 2–0. They became the 8th test nation to reach this milestone.

Sri Lanka cricket was suspended, by the ICC on 10 November 2023 due to the alleged political interference with the cricket administration. The suspension was fully lifted on 28 January 2024.

== Administration ==
The Sri Lanka Cricket, formerly the Board for Cricket Control in Sri Lanka (BCCSL), is the principal national governing body of cricket in Sri Lanka. It operates the Sri Lankan cricket team, Sri Lanka A cricket team, Sri Lankan women's cricket team and first-class cricket within Sri Lanka. Sri Lanka is a full member of the International Cricket Council and the Asian Cricket Council. Sri Lanka co-hosted the 1996 Cricket World Cup and the 2011 Cricket World Cup.

== National teams ==
The Sri Lanka national cricket team is governed by the Sri Lanka Cricket (SLC) and is a member of the Asian Cricket Council (ACC). Since 1981, the SLC has been affiliated with ICC, the international governing body for world cricket. In 1983, the SLC became one of the founding members of the ACC.

=== Performance ===
The following list includes the performance of all of India's national teams at major competitions.

==== Men's senior team ====
The Sri Lankan cricket team is the national cricket team of Sri Lanka. The team first played One day international cricket in the 1975 Cricket World Cup and were later awarded Test status in 1981, which made Sri Lanka the eighth Test cricket playing nation.

| Tournament | Appearance in finals | Last appearance | Best performance |
|---|---|---|---|
| ICC Men's Cricket World Cup | 3 out of 13 | 2023 | Champions (1996) |
| ICC Men's T20 World Cup | 3 out of 9 | 2024 | Champions (2014) |
| ICC Champions Trophy | 1 out of 8 | 2017 | Champions (2002) |
| ICC World Test Championship | 0 out of 3 | 2023–25 | 5th (2021–23) |
| Asia Cup | 13 out of 16 | 2023 | Champions (1986, 1997, 2004, 2008, 2014, 2022) |
| Commonwealth Games | 0 out of 1 | 1998 | Group Stage (1998) |
| Asian Games | 1 out of 3 | 2022 | Gold Medal (2014) |

==== Women's senior team ====
The Sri Lankan women's cricket team is the team that represents Sri Lanka in international women's cricket matches. Sri Lankan women's cricket team's international debut came in 1997 with a three match ODI series against the Netherlands. Since then, the team has represented Sri Lanka in international women's cricket tournaments.

| Tournament | Appearance in finals | Last appearance | Best performance |
|---|---|---|---|
| ICC Women's Cricket World Cup | 0 out of 12 | 2017 | Quarter-final (1997) |
| ICC Women's T20 World Cup | 0 out of 9 | 2024 | 1st round (2009, 2010, 2012, 2014, 2016, 2018, 2020, 2023) |
| Women's Asia Cup | 6 out of 9 | 2024 | Champions (2024) |
| Commonwealth Games | 0 out of 1 | 2022 | Group Stage (2022) |
| Asian Games | 1 out of 3 | 2022 | Siver Medal (2022) |

==== Men A team ====
| Tournament | Appearance in finals | Last appearance | Best performance |
|---|---|---|---|
| ACC Emerging Teams Asia Cup | 3 out of 6 | 2024 | Champions (2017, 2018) |

==== Women's A team ====
| Tournament | Finals appearance | Last appearance | Best performance |
|---|---|---|---|
| ACC Women's T20 Emerging Teams Asia Cup | 0 out of 1 | 2023 | Semi-final (2023) |

==== Men's U-19 team ====
| Tournament | Appearance in finals | Last appearance | Best performance |
|---|---|---|---|
| ICC Under-19 Cricket World Cup | 1 out of 15 | 2024 | Runners-up (2000) |
| ACC Under-19 Asia Cup | 5 out of 11 | 2024 | Runners-up (1989, 2003, 2016, 2018, 2021) |

==== Women's U-19 team ====
| Tournament | Appearance in finals | Last appearance | Best performance |
|---|---|---|---|
| Under-19 Women's T20 World Cup | 0 out of 1 | 2023 | Super 6 (2023) |
| Under-19 Women's T20 Asia Cup | 0 out of 1 | 2024 | Super 4 (2024) |

== Organisation of cricket in modern Sri Lanka ==
=== International cricket ===
International cricket in Sri Lanka generally does not follow a fixed pattern. For example, the English schedule under which the nation tours other countries during the winter and plays at home during the summer. Generally, there has recently been a tendency to play more one-day matches than Test matches. Cricket in Sri Lanka is managed by the Sri Lanka Cricket (SLC).

==== Men's National Team ====
The Sri Lanka National Cricket Team represents Sri Lanka in international cricket matches.

Sri Lanka have been participating in international cricket since 1975 and competed in international tournament since the first ever the 1975 Cricket World Cup. They have competed in numerous tournaments over the years including the ACC tournaments. The Sri Lanka national cricket team has also provided some of the greatest players to the world, the biggest example of which is Kumar Sangakkara. Sri Lanka cricket has a rich history. The Sri Lanka men's national team is currently ranked No. 6 in Tests, No. 6 in ODIs and at 8th position in T20Is. Sri Lanka won two World Championship cups in 1996 under the captaincy of Arjuna Ranatunga.

- Test International-
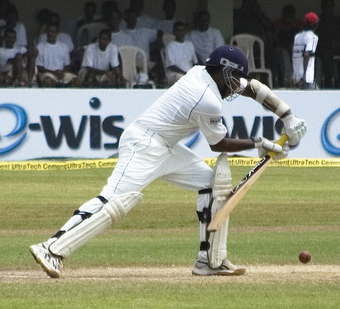
  Mahela Jayawardene batting in a Test match for Sri Lanka in 2008
  Sri Lanka obtained Full Member status of the ICC in 1981, becoming the eighth nation eligible to play Test cricket. The Sri Lanka national cricket team played their first Test match on 17 February 1982, against England, and recorded their first victory on 6 September 1985, in a match against India. Since then, they have played nearly 300 matches, against every other Test-playing nation. Sri Lanka holds the world record for the highest team score, which was established against India in 1997. The highest partnership in Test cricket was also established by two Sri Lankan batsmen; Mahela Jayawardene and Kumar Sangakkara. Sri Lankan players also hold the highest partnership scores for the second and third wickets.Top order batsman and former captain Kumar Sangakkara holds several Sri Lankan batting records as he has scored the most runs for Sri Lanka in Test cricket. He is also the record holder for the highest number of centuries as well as the highest number of half-centuries. The 374 made by Mahela Jayawardene against South Africa in 2006 is the highest individual score by a Sri Lankan cricketer, surpassing the previous best of 340 by Sanath Jayasuriya, which was established in 1997. It is also the fourth-highest individual score in Test cricket. Jayawardene, Jayasuriya and Kumar Sangakkara [319] are the only Sri Lankan players who have scored triple centuries.
- One Day International-
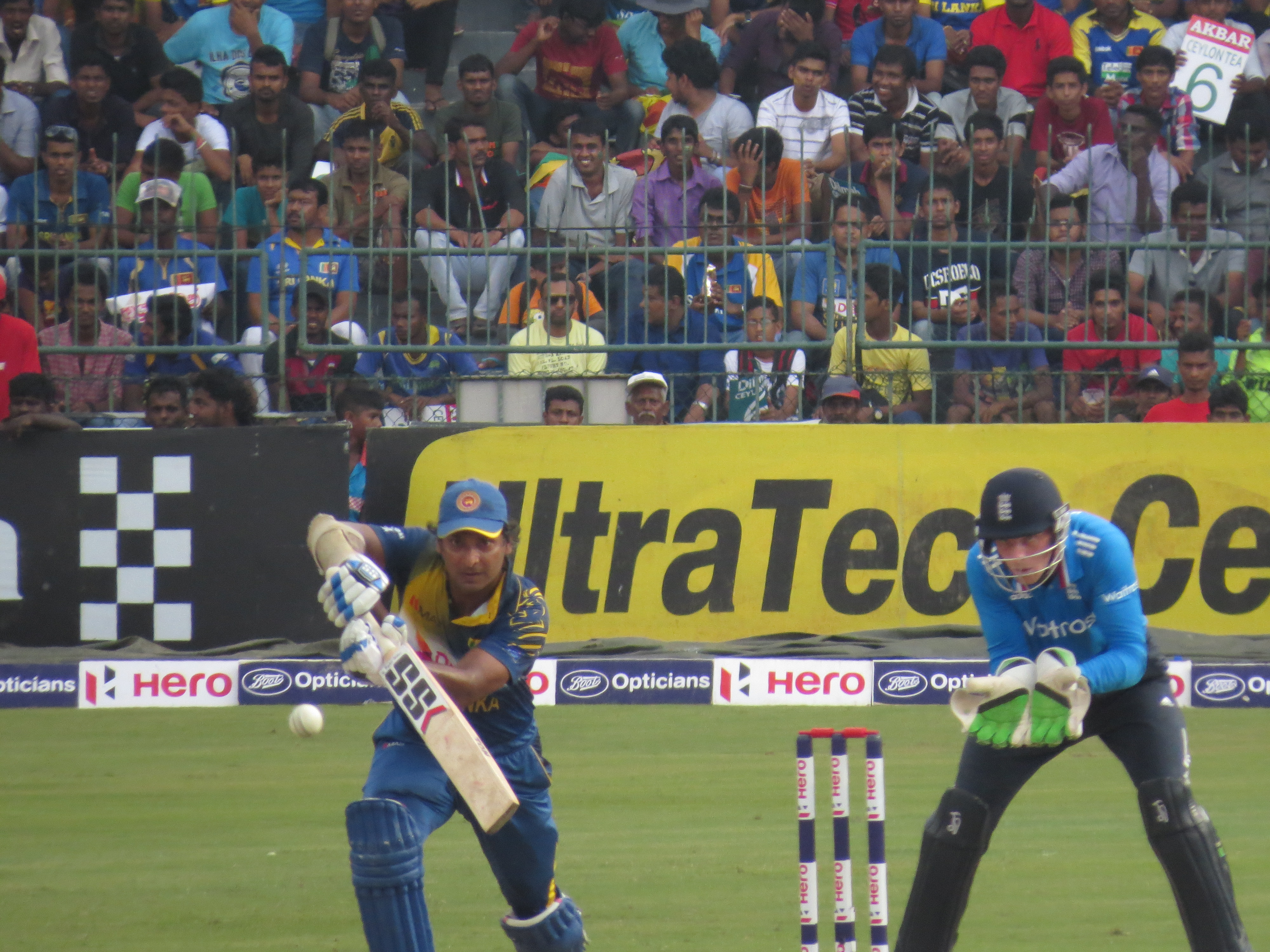
  Kumar Sangakkara batting against England in 2014 at the R.Premadasa Stadium in Colombo
  Sri Lanka played their first ODI International in 1975 against West Indies . They were able to participate in first edition of Cricket World Cup. Later 1996, they clinch the ODI world cup title under Arjuna Ranatunga captaincy.
- T20 International- Sri Lanka played their first T20 International in 2006 against England. Sri Lanka have made great impact in T20 international from their early day of this format. They have also been able to clinch the T20 world cup title in year 2014.

==== Women's National Team ====
The Sri Lanka national women's cricket team represents Sri Lanka in international women's cricket matches.

Sri Lanka have been participating in international cricket since 1997 and competed in international tournament since 1997 Women's Cricket World Cup. They have competed in numerous tournaments over the years including the ACC tournaments. They are the second most successful women's cricket team in Asia. The Sri Lanka Women's national team is also currently ranked No. 5 in ODIs and at 7th position in T20Is.

- Test International- Sri Lanka made their debut as a Test playing nation in 1998 against Pakistan. In past time, Sri Lanka women's rarely play test and won it
- One Day International-Sri Lanka played their first ODI International in 1997 against Netherlands. They were not able to participate in first five edition of Women's Cricket World Cup. But from late 19s they have been reaching to ODI world cup consequently.
- T20 International- Sri Lanka played their first T20 International in 2009 against Pakistan. Sri Lanka Women's have made great impact in T20 international from their early day of this format. They have been reaching ICC Women's T20 World Cup consequently from first Edition.

=== Domestic Cricket ===
Sri Lanka Cricket oversees the progress and handling of all major domestic competitions

==== Men's Domestic Cricket ====
===== First class competitions =====
- National Super League 4-Day Tournament
- 'Major League Tournament

===== Limited overs competitions =====
- National Super League Limited Over Tournament
- Major Clubs Limited Over Tournament

===== Twenty20 competitions =====
- Lanka Premier League
- National Super League T20
- Major Clubs T20 Tournament

==== Women's Domestic Cricket ====
===== Limited overs competitions =====
- Sri Lanka Women's Division One Tournament

==== Inter-City Tournaments ====
The National Super League (NSL) is an inter-city tournament, in which each city is assigned a set of cricket clubs, where the best players are selected to play for each city, it covers all three formats (First Class, List A and T20), the tournament has a women's version.

- First-class Tournament - National Super League (NSL):

National Super League 4-Day Tournament, established in 2022, currently with 5 teams.

==== Defunct Tournaments ====
Several competitions have been arranged where teams were formed out of each of the major provinces, independent to the above clubs (these tournaments are defunct and are replaced with the National Super League):

- Inter-Provincial Cricket (1990-2011) Consisted of 5 teams (Basnahira North, Basnahira South, Kandurata, Ruhuna, and Wayamba)
- Sri Lanka Premier League (SLPL) (2012) was a Twenty20 cricket competition in Sri Lanka. It was intended to be the premier Twenty20 league in the country, held by Sri Lanka Cricket, when it replaced the Inter-Provincial Twenty20 competition.
- Super Four Provincial (2017-2018) Consisted of 4 teams (Colombo, Dambulla, Galle, and Kandy)

== Stadiums ==
Sri Lanka has a plethora of international standards Cricket stadiums.

=== Active stadiums ===
| Name | Image | Location | Capacity | Test | | ODI | | T20I | | Ref. |
| Name | Image | Location | Capacity | First | Last | First | Last | First | Last | Ref. |
|---|---|---|---|---|---|---|---|---|---|---|
| Galle International Stadium | | Galle, Southern Province | 35,000 | (New Zealand) v (Sri Lanka); 3 June 1998 | (Bangladesh) v (Sri Lanka); 17 June 2025 | (Australia) v (Sri Lanka); 22 August 1999 | (Zimbabwe) v (Sri Lanka); 2 July 2017 | —N/a | —N/a | |
| Mahinda Rajapaksa International Cricket Stadium | | Sooriyawewa, Southern Province | 35,000 | —N/a | —N/a | (Sri Lanka) v (Canada); 20 February 2011 | (Afghanistan) v (Pakistan); 4 August 2023 | (Sri Lanka) v (Pakistan); 1 June 2012 | (South Africa) v (Sri Lanka); 6 August 2013 | |
| Paikiasothy Saravanamuttu Stadium | | Colombo, Western Province | 15,000 | (Sri Lanka) v (England); 17 February 1987 | (Sri Lanka) v (New Zealand); 22 August 2019 | (Australia) v (Sri Lanka); 13 April 1983 | (Sri Lanka) v (Bangladesh); 20 July 2007 | (Afghanistan) v (Ireland); 1 February 2010 | (Nepal) v (Hong Kong); 24 November 2014 | |
| Pallekele International Cricket Stadium | | Pallekele, Central Province | 35,000 | (Cricket West Indies) v (Sri Lanka); 1 December 2010 | (Sri Lanka) v (Bangladesh); 29 April 2021 | (New Zealand) v (Pakistan); 8 March 2011 | (Sri Lanka) v (Bangladesh); 8 July 2025 | (Sri Lanka) v (Australia); 6 August 2011 | (Bangladesh) v (Sri Lanka); 10 July 2025 | |
| R. Premadasa Stadium | | Colombo, Western Province | 35,000 | (Australia) v (Sri Lanka); 28 August 1992 | (Zimbabwe) v (Sri Lanka); 14 July 2017 | (Sri Lanka) v (New Zealand); 5 April 1986 | (Bangladesh) v (Sri Lanka); 5 July 2025 | (Sri Lanka) v (India); 10 February 2009 | (Sri Lanka) v (Bangladesh); 16 July 2025 | |
| Rangiri Dambulla International Stadium | | Dambulla, Central Province | 16,800 | —N/a | —N/a | (England) v (Sri Lanka); 23 March 2001 | (Sri Lanka) v (New Zealand); 13 November 2024 | (Sri Lanka) v (Afghanistan); 17 February 2024 | (Bangladesh) v (Sri Lanka); 13 July 2025 | |
| Sinhalese Sports Club Ground (SSC) | | Colombo, Western Province | 10,000 | (Sri Lanka) v (England); 13 March 1984 | (Sri Lanka) v (Bangladesh); 25 June 2025 | (England) v (Sri Lanka); 13 February 1982 | (Cricket West Indies) v (Sri Lanka); 22 February 2020 | (Canada) v (Ireland); 3 February 2010 | (Canada) v (Afghanistan); 4 February 2010 | |

== International competitions hosted ==
| Competition | Edition | Winner | Final | Runners-up | Sri Lanka's position | Venues | Final venue | Stadium |
Men's senior competitions
| Asia Cup | 1986 Asia Cup | Sri Lanka | 191/9 (45 overs) – 195/5 (42.2 overs) | Pakistan | Champions | 4 ( in 3 cities) | Singhalese Sports Club Cricket Ground | |
| ICC Men's Cricket World Cup | 1996 Cricket World Cup | Sri Lanka | 241/7 (50 overs) – 245/3 (46.2 overs) | Australia | Champions | 26 (in 3 countries) | Gaddafi Stadium | |
| Asia Cup | 1997 Asia Cup | Sri Lanka | 239/7 (50 overs) – 240/2 (36.5 overs) | India | Champions | 2 ( in 1 city) | R. Premadasa Stadium | |
| Under-19 Men's Cricket World Cup | 2000 Under-19 Cricket World Cup | India | 178 (48.1 overs) – 180/4 (40.4 overs) | Sri Lanka | Runners-up | 16 (in 7 cities) | Singhalese Sports Club Cricket Ground | |
| ICC Champions Trophy | 2002 ICC Champions Trophy | India & Sri Lanka | 222/7 (50 overs) - 38/1 (8.4 overs) | | Champions | 2 (in 1 city) | R. Premadasa Stadium | |
| Asia Cup | 2004 Asia Cup | Sri Lanka | 228/9 (50 overs) – 203/9 (50 overs) | India | Champions | 3 ( in 2 cities) | R. Premadasa Stadium | |
| Under-19 Men's Cricket World Cup | 2006 Under-19 Cricket World Cup | Pakistan | 109 (41.1 overs) – 71 (18.5 overs) | India | 6th | 4 (in 1 city) | R. Premadasa Stadium | |
| Asia Cup | 2010 Asia Cup | India | 268/6 (50 overs) – 187 (44.4 overs) | Sri Lanka | Runners-up | 1 ( in 1 city) | Rangiri Dambulla International Stadium | |
| ICC Men's Cricket World Cup | 2011 Cricket World Cup | India | 277/4 (48.2 overs) – 274/6 (50 overs) | Sri Lanka | Runners-up | 13 (in 3 countries) | Wankhede Stadium | |
| ICC Men's T20 World Cup | 2012 World Twenty20 | West Indies | 137/6 (20 overs) – 101 (18.4 overs) | Sri Lanka | Runners-up | 3 (in 3 cities) | R. Premadasa Stadium | |
| ACC Under-19 Asia Cup | 2016 ACC Under-19 Asia Cup | India | 273/8 (50 overs) – 239 (48.4 overs) | Sri Lanka | Runners-up | 7 (in 5 cities) | R. Premadasa Stadium | |
| ACC Emerging Teams Asia Cup | 2018 ACC Emerging Teams Asia Cup | Sri Lanka A | 270/7 (50 overs) – 267/9 (50 overs) | India A | Champions | 4 (in 2 countries) | R. Premadasa Stadium | |
| ACC Under-19 Asia Cup | 2019 ACC Under-19 Asia Cup | India | 106 (32.4 overs) – 101 (33 overs) | Bangladesh | 4th | 6 (in 4 cities) | R. Premadasa Stadium | |
| ACC Emerging Teams Asia Cup | 2023 ACC Emerging Teams Asia Cup | Pakistan A | 352/8 (50 overs) – 224 (40 overs) | India A | Semi-final | 4 (in 1 city) | R. Premadasa Stadium | |
| Asia Cup | 2023 Asia Cup | India | 50 (15.2 overs) – 51/0 (6.1 overs) | Sri Lanka | Runners-up | 4 ( in 2 countries) | R. Premadasa Stadium | |
Women's senior competitions
| Women's Asia Cup | 2004 Women's Asia Cup | India | 178/5 (50 overs) – 84 (45.2 overs) | Sri Lanka | Runners-up | 2 (in 2 cities) | Singhalese Sports Club Cricket Ground | |
| Women's Asia Cup | 2008 Women's Asia Cup | India | 260/7 (50 overs) – 83/10 (35.2 overs) | Sri Lanka | Runners-up | 2 (in 2 cities) | Welagedara Stadium | |
| ICC Women's T20 World Cup | 2012 Women's World Twenty20 | Australia | 142/4 (20 overs) – 138/9 (20 overs) | England | Group Stage | 2 (in 2 cities) | R. Premadasa Stadium | |
| Women's Asia Cup | 2024 Women's Twenty20 Asia Cup | Sri Lanka | 165/6 (20 overs) – 167/2 (18.4 overs) | India | Champions | 1 (in 1 city) | Rangiri Dambulla International Stadium | |

== Performance in international competitions ==
A red box around the year indicates tournaments played within Sri Lanka

Key
| Champions |
| Runners-up |
| Semi-finals |

=== Men's team ===
==== ICC World Test Championship ====
ICC World Test Championship record
| Year | League stage | | | | | | | | | | Final Host | Final | Final Position |
| Year | Pos | Matches | | | | | Ded | PC | Pts | PCT | Final Host | Final | Final Position |
| Year | Pos | P | W | L | D | T | Ded | PC | Pts | PCT | Final Host | Final | Final Position |
| 2019/21 | 7/9 | 12 | 2 | 6 | 4 | 0 | 0 | 720 | 200 | 27.8 | Rose Bowl, England | DNQ | 7th |
| 2021/23 | 5/9 | 12 | 5 | 6 | 1 | 0 | 0 | 144 | 64 | 44.4 | The Oval, England | DNQ | 5th |

==== ICC Cricket World Cup ====
World Cup record
| Year | Round | Position | GP | W | L | T | NR |
|---|---|---|---|---|---|---|---|
| (England) 1975 | Group Stage | 7/8 | 3 | 0 | 3 | 0 | 0 |
| (England) 1979 | Group Stage | 5/8 | 3 | 1 | 1 | 0 | 1 |
| (England) (Wales) 1983 | Group Stage | 7/8 | 6 | 1 | 5 | 0 | 0 |
| (India) (Pakistan) 1987 | Group Stage | 7/8 | 6 | 0 | 6 | 0 | 0 |
| (Australia) (New Zealand) 1992 | Group Stage | 8/9 | 8 | 2 | 5 | 0 | 1 |
| (India) (Pakistan) (Sri Lanka) 1996 | Champions | 1/12 | 8 | 8 | 0 | 0 | 0 |
| (England) (Republic of Ireland) (Netherlands) (Scotland) (Wales) 1999 | Group stage | 10/12 | 5 | 2 | 3 | 0 | 0 |
| (South Africa) (Kenya) (Zimbabwe) 2003 | Semi-finals | 4/14 | 10 | 5 | 4 | 0 | 1 |
| (Cricket West Indies) 2007 | Runners-up | 2/16 | 11 | 8 | 3 | 0 | 0 |
| (Bangladesh) (India) (Sri Lanka) 2011 | Runners-up | 2/14 | 9 | 6 | 2 | 0 | 1 |
| (Australia) (New Zealand) 2015 | Quarter-finals | 7/14 | 8 | 4 | 3 | 0 | 1 |
| (England) (Wales) 2019 | Group stage | 6/10 | 9 | 3 | 4 | 0 | 2 |
| (India) 2023 | Group stage | 9/10 | 9 | 2 | 7 | 0 | 0 |
| Total | Champion (1996) | 1 title | 89 | 40 | 46 | 1 | 2 |

==== ICC T20 World Cup ====
World Twenty20 record
| Year | Round | Position | GP | W | L | T | NR |
|---|---|---|---|---|---|---|---|
| (South Africa) 2007 | Super 8s | 6/12 | 5 | 3 | 2 | 0 | 0 |
| (England) 2009 | Runners-up | 2/12 | 7 | 6 | 1 | 0 | 0 |
| (Cricket West Indies) 2010 | Semi-finals | 3/12 | 6 | 3 | 3 | 0 | 0 |
| (Sri Lanka) 2012 | Runners-up | 2/12 | 7 | 5 | 2 | 0 | 0 |
| (Bangladesh) 2014 | Champions | 1/16 | 6 | 5 | 1 | 0 | 0 |
| (India) 2016 | Super 10s | 8/16 | 4 | 1 | 3 | 0 | 0 |
| (United Arab Emirates) (Oman) 2021 | Super 12s | 8/16 | 8 | 5 | 3 | 0 | 0 |
| (Australia) 2022 | Super 12s | 7/16 | 8 | 4 | 4 | 0 | 0 |
| (Cricket West Indies) (United States) 2024 | Group stage | 12/20 | 4 | 1 | 2 | 0 | 1 |
| (India) (Sri Lanka) 2026 | Qualified | TBD/20 | 0 | 0 | 0 | 0 | 0 |
| Total | Champion (2014) | 1 title | 43 | 28 | 15 | 0 | 0 |

==== ICC Champions Trophy ====
Champions Trophy record
| Year | Round | Position | GP | W | L | T | NR |
|---|---|---|---|---|---|---|---|
| (Bangladesh) 1998 | Semi-finals | 3 or 4/9 | 2 | 1 | 1 | 0 | 0 |
| (Kenya) 2000 | Quarter-finals | 5–8/8 | 2 | 1 | 1 | 0 | 0 |
| (Sri Lanka) 2002 | Champions | 1/12 | 4 | 3 | 0 | 0 | 1 |
| (England) 2004 | Round 1 | 8/12 | 2 | 1 | 1 | 0 | 0 |
| (India) 2006 | Round 1 | 8/10 | 6 | 4 | 2 | 0 | 0 |
| (South Africa) 2009 | Round 1 | 6/8 | 3 | 1 | 2 | 0 | 0 |
| (England) (Wales) 2013 | Semi-finals | 3 or 4/8 | 4 | 2 | 2 | 0 | 0 |
| (England) (Wales) 2017 | Round 1 | 6/8 | 3 | 1 | 2 | 0 | 0 |
| (Pakistan) (United Arab Emirates) 2025 | Did not qualify | | | | | | |
| Total | 7/7 | 1 title | 26 | 14 | 11 | 0 | 1 |

==== World Cup Qualifier ====
World Cup Qualifier record
| Year | Round | Position | GP | W | L | T | AB |
|---|---|---|---|---|---|---|---|
| (England) 1979 | Champions | 1/12 | 6 | 4 | 1 | 0 | 1 |
| (Zimbabwe) 2023 | Champions | 1/10 | 8 | 8 | 0 | 0 | 0 |
| Total | 2/2 | 2 title | 14 | 12 | 1 | 0 | 1 |

==== Asia Cup ====
Asia Cup record
| Year | Round | Position | GP | W | L | T | NR |
|---|---|---|---|---|---|---|---|
| (United Arab Emirates) 1984 | Second place | 2/3 | 2 | 1 | 1 | 0 | 0 |
| (Sri Lanka) 1986 | Champions | 1/3 | 3 | 2 | 1 | 0 | 0 |
| (Bangladesh) 1988 | Runners-up | 2/4 | 4 | 3 | 1 | 0 | 0 |
| (India) 1990–91 | Runners-up | 2/3 | 3 | 2 | 1 | 0 | 0 |
| (United Arab Emirates) 1995 | Runners-up | 2/4 | 4 | 2 | 2 | 0 | 0 |
| (Sri Lanka) 1997 | Champions | 1/4 | 4 | 4 | 0 | 0 | 0 |
| (Bangladesh) 2000 | Runners-up | 2/4 | 4 | 2 | 2 | 0 | 0 |
| (Sri Lanka) 2004 | Champions | 1/6 | 6 | 4 | 2 | 0 | 0 |
| (Pakistan) 2008 | Champions | 1/6 | 6 | 5 | 1 | 0 | 0 |
| (Sri Lanka) 2010 | Runners-up | 2/4 | 4 | 3 | 1 | 0 | 0 |
| (Bangladesh) 2012 | Round 1 | 4/4 | 3 | 0 | 3 | 0 | 0 |
| (Bangladesh) 2014 | Champions | 1/5 | 5 | 5 | 0 | 0 | 0 |
| (Bangladesh) 2016 | Round 1 | 4/5 | 4 | 1 | 3 | 0 | 0 |
| (United Arab Emirates) 2018 | Round 1 | 6/6 | 2 | 0 | 2 | 0 | 0 |
| (United Arab Emirates) 2022 | Champions | 1/6 | 6 | 5 | 1 | 0 | 0 |
| (Sri Lanka) (Pakistan) 2023 | Runners up | 2/6 | 6 | 4 | 2 | 0 | 0 |
| (India) 2025 | Qualified | TBD/6 | 0 | 0 | 0 | 0 | 0 |
| Total | 16/16 | 6 titles | 66 | 43 | 23 | 0 | 0 |

==== Commonwealth Games ====
Commonwealth Games record
| Year | Round | Position | GP | W | L | T | NR |
|---|---|---|---|---|---|---|---|
| (Malaysia) 1998 | Fourth place | 4/16 | 5 | 3 | 2 | 0 | 0 |
| Total | 1/1 | 0 Titles | 5 | 3 | 2 | 0 | 0 |

==== Asian Games ====
Asian Games record
| Year | Round | Position | GP | W | L | T | NR |
|---|---|---|---|---|---|---|---|
| (China) 2010 | Bronze medal match | 4/9 | 3 | 1 | 2 | 0 | 0 |
| (South Korea) 2014 | Gold medal match | 1/9 | 3 | 2 | 0 | 0 | 1 |
| (China) 2022 | Quarter Finals | 1/8 | 1 | 0 | 1 | 0 | 0 |
| Total | 3/3 | 1 title | 7 | 3 | 3 | 0 | 1 |

==== Defunct tournaments ====
Asian Test Championship record
| Year | Round | Position | GP | W | L | D | NR |
|---|---|---|---|---|---|---|---|
| India Sri Lanka Bangladesh Pakistan 1998–99 | Runners-up | 2/3 | 3 | 0 | 1 | 2 | 0 |
| Sri Lanka Bangladesh Pakistan 2001–02 | Champions | 1/3 | 2 | 2 | 0 | 0 | 0 |
| Total | 2/2 | 1 title | 5 | 2 | 1 | 2 | 0 |

Austral-Asia Cup record
| Year | Round | Position | GP | W | L | T | NR |
|---|---|---|---|---|---|---|---|
| United Arab Emirates 1986 | Semi Finals | ?/5 | 1 | 0 | 1 | 0 | 0 |
| United Arab Emirates 1989–90 | Semi Finals | ?/6 | 3 | 1 | 2 | 0 | 0 |
| United Arab Emirates 1994 | First Round | ?/6 | 2 | 0 | 2 | 0 | 0 |
| Total | 3/3 | 0 titles | 6 | 1 | 5 | 0 | 0 |

=== Women's team ===
==== ICC Women's Cricket World Cup ====
World Cup record
| Year | Round | Position | Played | Won | Lost | Tie | NR |
|---|---|---|---|---|---|---|---|
| (England) 1973 | Did not participate | | | | | | |
| (India) 1978 | Did not participate | | | | | | |
| (New Zealand) 1982 | Did not participate | | | | | | |
| (Australia) 1988 | Did not participate | | | | | | |
| (England) 1993 | Did not participate | | | | | | |
| (India) 1997 | Quarter finals | 8/11 | 5 | 1 | 3 | 0 | 1 |
| (New Zealand) 2000 | Group Stage | 6/8 | 7 | 2 | 5 | 0 | 0 |
| (South Africa) 2005 | Group Stage | 6/8 | 7 | 1 | 4 | 0 | 2 |
| (Australia) 2009 | Group Stage | 7/8 | 3 | 0 | 3 | 0 | 0 |
| (India) 2013 | Super Six | 6/8 | 8 | 3 | 5 | 0 | 0 |
| (England) 2017 | Group Stage | 7/8 | 7 | 1 | 6 | 0 | 0 |
| (New Zealand) 2022 | Did not qualify | | | | | | |
| (India) 2025 | | | | | | | |
| Total | 0 Title | - | 37 | 8 | 26 | 0 | 3 |

==== ICC Women's T20 World Cup ====
T20 World Cup record
| Year | Round | Position | Played | Won | Lost | Tie | NR |
|---|---|---|---|---|---|---|---|
| (England) 2009 | Group Stage | 6/8 | 3 | 1 | 2 | 0 | 0 |
| (Cricket West Indies) 2010 | Group Stage | 6/8 | 3 | 1 | 2 | 0 | 0 |
| (Sri Lanka) 2012 | Group Stage | 5/8 | 3 | 1 | 2 | 0 | 0 |
| (Bangladesh) 2014 | Group Stage | 7/10 | 4 | 1 | 3 | 0 | 0 |
| (India) 2016 | Group Stage | 5/10 | 4 | 2 | 2 | 0 | 0 |
| (United Arab Emirates) 2018 | Group Stage | 6/10 | 4 | 1 | 2 | 0 | 1 |
| (Australia) 2020 | Group Stage | 8/10 | 4 | 1 | 3 | 0 | 0 |
| (South Africa) 2023 | Group Stage | 7/10 | 4 | 2 | 2 | 0 | 0 |
| (United Arab Emirates) 2024 | Group Stage | 9/10 | 4 | 0 | 4 | 0 | 0 |
| (England) 2026 | | | | | | | |
| Total | 0 Title | - | 33 | 10 | 22 | 0 | 1 |

==== ICC Women's Championship ====
Women's Championship record
| Year | Round | Position | GP | W | L | D | T | NR |
|---|---|---|---|---|---|---|---|---|
| 2014-16 | Group Stage | 8/8 | 21 | 2 | 18 | 0 | 0 | 1 |
| 2017-20 | Group Stage | 8/8 | 21 | 1 | 17 | 0 | 0 | 3 |
| 2022-25 | Group Stage | 5/10 | 24 | 9 | 11 | 1 | 0 | 4 |
| Total | 0 Title | - | 66 | 12 | 46 | 0 | 0 | 8 |

==== ICC Women's Cricket World Cup Qualifier ====
Women's Cricket World Cup Qualifier record
| Year | Round | Position | GP | W | L | D | T | NR |
|---|---|---|---|---|---|---|---|---|
| 2003 | Did not participate, already qualified for World Cup | | | | | | | |
| 2018 | Did not participate, already qualified for World Cup | | | | | | | |
| 2011 | Semi-final | 3/10 | 6 | 4 | 2 | 0 | 0 | 0 |
| 2017 | Semi-final | 3/10 | 9 | 6 | 3 | 0 | 0 | 0 |
| 2021 | Already Qualified | | | | | | | |
| Total | 0 Title | - | 15 | 10 | 5 | 0 | 0 | 0 |

==== ICC Women's T20 World Cup Qualifier ====
Women's T20 World Cup Qualifier record
| Year | Round | Position | GP | W | L | D | T | NR |
|---|---|---|---|---|---|---|---|---|
| 2013 | Champion | 1/8 | 5 | 4 | 0 | 0 | 0 | 1 |
| 2015 | Did not participate, already qualified for World Cup | | | | | | | |
| 2018 | Did not participate, already qualified for World Cup | | | | | | | |
| 2019 | Did not participate, already qualified for World Cup | | | | | | | |
| 2022 | Did not participate, already qualified for World Cup | | | | | | | |
| 2024 | Champion | 1/10 | 6 | 6 | 0 | 0 | 0 | 0 |
| Total | 2 Title | - | 11 | 10 | 5 | 0 | 0 | 1 |

==== ACC Women's Asia Cup ====
Asia Cup record
| Year | Round | Position | Played | Won | Lost | Tie | NR |
|---|---|---|---|---|---|---|---|
| (Sri Lanka) 2004 | Runners-up | 2/2 | 5 | 0 | 5 | 0 | 0 |
| (Pakistan) 2005–06 | Runners-up | 2/3 | 5 | 2 | 3 | 0 | 0 |
| (India) 2006 | Runners-up | 2/3 | 4 | 2 | 2 | 0 | 0 |
| (Sri Lanka) 2008 | Runners-up | 2/4 | 7 | 4 | 3 | 0 | 0 |
| (China) 2012 | Semi-final | 3/8 | 4 | 2 | 2 | 0 | 0 |
| (Thailand) 2016 | Group Stage | 3/6 | 5 | 3 | 2 | 0 | 0 |
| (Malaysia) 2018 | Group Stage | 4/6 | 5 | 2 | 3 | 0 | 0 |
| (Bangladesh) 2022 | Runners-up | 2/7 | 8 | 5 | 3 | 0 | 0 |
| (Sri Lanka) 2024 | Champions | 1/8 | 5 | 5 | 0 | 0 | 0 |
| Total | 1 Titles | - | 48 | 25 | 23 | 0 | 0 |

==== Commonwealth Games ====
Commonwealth Games record
| Year | Round | Position | GP | W | L | T | NR |
|---|---|---|---|---|---|---|---|
| (England) 2022 | Group Stage | 8/8 | 3 | 0 | 3 | 0 | 0 |
| Total | 0 Title | - | 3 | 0 | 3 | 0 | 0 |

==== Commonwealth Games Cricket Qualifier ====
Commonwealth Games Cricket Qualifier record
| Year | Round | Position | GP | W | L | T | NR |
|---|---|---|---|---|---|---|---|
| (Malaysia) 2022 | Champion | 1/5 | 4 | 4 | 0 | 0 | 0 |
| Total | 1 Title | - | 4 | 4 | 0 | 0 | 0 |

==== Asian Games ====
Asian Games record
| Year | Round | Position | GP | W | L | T | NR |
|---|---|---|---|---|---|---|---|
| (China) 2010 | Did not participate | | | | | | |
| (South Korea) 2014 | Bronze medal | 1/10 | 3 | 2 | 1 | 0 | 0 |
| (China) 2022 | Silver medal | 1/9 | 3 | 2 | 1 | 0 | 0 |
| Total | 1 Title | - | 6 | 4 | 2 | 0 | 0 |

=== Men's U-19 team ===
==== U-19 World Cup ====
| Year | Result | Pos. | Squad |
|---|---|---|---|
| (Australia) 1988 | Group stage | 5/8 | Squad |
| (South Africa) 1998 | Super eights | 6/16 | Squad |
| (Sri Lanka) 2000 | Runners-up | 2/16 | Squad |
| (New Zealand) 2002 | Super league | 9/16 | Squad |
| (Bangladesh) 2004 | Super league | 6/16 | Squad |
| (Sri Lanka) 2006 | Super League Play-off Semi Finals | 6/16 | Squad |
| (Malaysia) 2008 | Super quarter-finals | 8/16 | Squad |
| (New Zealand) 2010 | Super semi-finals | 4/16 | Squad |
| (Australia) 2012 | Group stage | 9/16 | Squad |
| (United Arab Emirates) 2014 | Super quarter-finals | 8/16 | Squad |
| (Bangladesh) 2016 | Semi-finals | 4/16 | Squad |
| (New Zealand) 2018 | Group stage | 9/16 | Squad |
| (South Africa) 2020 | Group stage | 10/16 | Squad |
| (Cricket West Indies) 2022 | Super league quarter-finals | 6/16 | Squad |
| (South Africa) 2024 | Super six | 10/16 | Squad |
| (Zimbabwe) (Namibia) 2026 | Qualified | | |

==== U-19 Asia Cup ====
| Year | Result | Pos. |
|---|---|---|
| (Bangladesh) 1989 | Runners up | 2/3 |
| (Pakistan) 2003 | Runners up | 2/4 |
| (Malaysia) 2012 | Semi-finals | 3/8 |
| (United Arab Emirates) 2014 | Semi-finals | 3/8 |
| (Sri Lanka) 2016 | Runners up | 2/8 |
| (Malaysia) 2017 | Group stage | 6/8 |
| (Bangladesh) 2018 | Runners up | 2/8 |
| (Sri Lanka) 2019 | Semi-finals | 4/8 |
| (United Arab Emirates) 2021 | Runners up | 2/8 |
| (United Arab Emirates) 2023 | Group stage | 5/8 |
| (United Arab Emirates) 2024 | Semi-finals | 4/8 |
| (Nepal) 2025 | Qualified | |

=== Women's U-19 team ===
==== Under-19 Women's World Cup ====
Sri Lanka's U19 Twenty20 World Cup Record
| Year | Result | Pos | № | Pld | W | L | T | NR |
|---|---|---|---|---|---|---|---|---|
| (South Africa) 2023 | Super 6 | 10/16 | 16 | 5 | 1 | 4 | 0 | 0 |
| (Malaysia) (Thailand) 2025 | To be determined | | | | | | | |
| (Bangladesh) (Nepal) 2027 | To be determined | | | | | | | |
| Total | | | | 5 | 1 | 4 | 0 | 0 |

==== Under-19 Women's Asia Cup ====
Sri Lanka's Under-19 Twenty20 Asia Cup Record
| Year | Result | Pos | № | Pld | W | L | T | NR |
|---|---|---|---|---|---|---|---|---|
| (Malaysia) 2024 | 4th place | 4/6 | 6 | 4 | 1 | 2 | 0 | 1 |
| Total | | – | – | 4 | 1 | 2 | 0 | 1 |

=== Men's A team ===
==== ACC Emerging Teams Asia Cup ====
ACC Emerging Teams Asia Cup record
| Year | Round | Position | P | W | L | T | NR |
|---|---|---|---|---|---|---|---|
| (Singapore) 2013 | Semi-final | 3/8 | 4 | 3 | 1 | 0 | 0 |
| (Bangladesh) 2017 | Champions | 1/8 | 5 | 4 | 1 | 0 | 0 |
| (Sri Lanka) (Pakistan) 2018 | Champions | 1/8 | 5 | 4 | 1 | 0 | 0 |
| (Bangladesh) 2019 | Group stage | 7/8 | 3 | 0 | 3 | 0 | 0 |
| (Sri Lanka) 2023 | Semi-final | 3/8 | 4 | 2 | 2 | 0 | 0 |
| (Oman) 2024 | Runners-up | 2/8 | 5 | 3 | 2 | 0 | 0 |
| Total | 2 Title | - | 26 | 16 | 10 | 0 | 0 |

=== Women's A team ===
==== ACC Women's T20 Emerging Teams Asia Cup ====
ACC Women's T20 Emerging Teams Asia Cup record
| Year | Round | Position | P | W | L | T | NR |
|---|---|---|---|---|---|---|---|
| (Hong Kong) 2023 | Semi-finals | 4/8 | 4 | 1 | 0 | 0 | 3 |
| Total | 0 Title | - | 4 | 1 | 0 | 0 | 3 |

== See also ==
- Big Match
- List of Sri Lankan cricket teams
- Sri Lankan national cricket captains
- List of Sri Lanka Twenty20 International cricket records
- List of Sri Lankan One Day International cricket records
- List of Sri Lankan Test cricket records
- List of international cricket grounds in Sri Lanka
- Sri Lanka national cricket team
- Sri Lanka women's national cricket team
- Sri Lanka national under-19 cricket team
- Sri Lanka women's national under-19 cricket team
- Sri Lanka A Men
