= Pakistan women's cricket team in Ireland in 2025 =

International cricket tour

	Ireland	Pakistan
- Dates: 6 – 10 August 2025
Captains	Gaby Lewis	Fatima Sana

Twenty20 International series
- Results: Ireland won the 3-match series 2–1
Most runs	Orla Prendergast (144)	Muneeba Ali (132)
Most wickets	Orla Prendergast (4); Lara McBride (4)	Fatima Sana (6)
- Player of the series: Orla Prendergast (Ire)

The Pakistan women's cricket team toured Ireland in August 2025 to play the Ireland women's cricket team. The tour consisted of three Twenty20 International (T20I) matches. In March 2025, the Cricket Ireland (CI) confirmed the fixtures for the tour, as a part of the 2025 home international season.

Ireland won the first T20I by 11 runs, despite Fatima Sana taking four wickets. Orla Prendergast and Laura Delany's 76 run partnership and Rebecca Stokell's quick 34 run, the hosts won the second T20I by four wickets in thriller and secured the series win. An unbeaten century by Muneeba Ali helped Pakistan to win the third T20I by eight wickets. Ireland won the series 2–1.

== Squads ==
Ireland	Pakistan
Gaby Lewis (c); Orla Prendergast (vc); Ava Canning; Christina Coulter Reilly (wk); Laura Delany; Amy Hunter (wk); Arlene Kelly; Louise Little; Jane Maguire; Lara McBride; Cara Murray; Leah Paul; Freya Sargent; Rebecca Stokell	Fatima Sana (c); Waheeda Akhtar; Muneeba Ali (wk); Najiha Alvi (wk); Sidra Ameen; Diana Baig; Eyman Fatima; Gull Feroza (wk); Tuba Hassan; Sadia Iqbal; Natalia Pervaiz; Aliya Riaz; Nashra Sandhu; ~~Sadaf Shamas~~; Rameen Shamim; Shawaal Zulfiqar

On 1 August, Sadaf Shamas was ruled out of the series due to tearing her left quadriceps muscle during a practice, with Shawaal Zulfiqar named as her replacement.

== T20I series ==
=== 1st T20I ===
6 August 2025
16:00
Scorecard

Ireland; 142 (19.4 overs)	v	Pakistan; 131/9 (20 overs)
Amy Hunter 37 (30); Fatima Sana 4/26 (4 overs)		Natalia Pervaiz 29 (23); Orla Prendergast 3/28 (4 overs)

Ireland won by 11 runs
Castle Avenue, Clontarf
Umpires: Roland Black (Ire) and Gareth Morrison (Ire)
Player of the match: Orla Prendergast (Ire)

- Pakistan won the toss and elected to field.
- Eyman Fatima (Pak) made her T20I debut.
- Aliya Riaz (Pak) played in her 100th T20I match.

=== 2nd T20I ===
8 August 2025
16:00
Scorecard

Pakistan; 168/6 (20 overs)	v	Ireland; 171/6 (20 overs)
Shawaal Zulfiqar 33 (27); Lara McBride 2/27 (3 overs)		Orla Prendergast 51 (34); Rameen Shamim 3/36 (4 overs)

Ireland won by 4 wickets
Castle Avenue, Clontarf
Umpires: Roland Black (Ire) and Aidan Seaver (Ire)
Player of the match: Rebecca Stokell (Ire)

- Pakistan won the toss and elected to bat.
- Orla Prendergast (Ire) took her 50th wicket in T20Is.
- Orla Prendergast and Laura Delany's 76 run partnership became the Ireland's highest for the 4th wicket in women's T20Is, breaking the record of 67 between Mary Waldron and Rebecca Stokell in 2019.

=== 3rd T20I ===
10 August 2025
16:00
Scorecard

Ireland; 155/4 (20 overs)	v	Pakistan; 156/2 (17.4 overs)
Orla Prendergast 64* (46); Rameen Shamim 1/18 (3 overs)		Muneeba Ali 100* (68); Ava Canning 1/17 (2.4 overs)

Pakistan won by 8 wickets
Castle Avenue, Clontarf
Umpires: Jonathan Kennedy (Ire) and Gareth Morrison (Ire)
Player of the match: Muneeba Ali (Pak)

- Ireland won the toss and elected to bat.
- Gaby Lewis (Ire) played in her 100th T20I match.
