= India women's cricket team in Sri Lanka in 2022 =

International cricket tour

	Sri Lanka	India
- Dates: 23 June – 7 July 2022
Captains	Chamari Athapaththu	Harmanpreet Kaur

One Day International series
- Results: India won the 3-match series 3–0
Most runs	Nilakshi de Silva (123)	Shafali Verma (155)
Most wickets	Inoka Ranaweera (6)	Renuka Singh (7)
- Player of the series: Harmanpreet Kaur (Ind)

Twenty20 International series
- Results: India won the 3-match series 2–1
Most runs	Chamari Athapaththu (139)	Harmanpreet Kaur (92)
Most wickets	Inoka Ranaweera (6)	Radha Yadav (4)
- Player of the series: Harmanpreet Kaur (Ind)

The India women's cricket team toured Sri Lanka to play against the Sri Lanka women's cricket team in June and July 2022. The tour consisted of three Women's One Day International (WODI) and three Women's Twenty20 International (WT20I) matches. The WODI matches were part of 2022–2025 ICC Women's Championship. Both teams used the matches as preparation for the women's cricket tournament at the 2022 Commonwealth Games in Birmingham, England. Harmanpreet Kaur was named as India's new captain for the tour, after Mithali Raj announced her retirement from international cricket.

The visitors won the WT20I series 2–1 and the WODI series 3–0.

India won the opening match of the tour, with a 34-run win in the first WT20I. India won the second WT20I by five wickets, recording their 12th successive win against Sri Lanka in the format, and won the series with a match to play. Sri Lanka won the third and final WT20I by seven wickets. It was Sri Lanka's first win against India at home in a WT20I match.

India won the first WODI match by four wickets. India then won the second WODI by ten wickets to take an unassailable lead in the series. India's run chase in the match was the highest successful target that was chased by a team in WODI cricket without losing a wicket. India won the third and final WODI by 39 runs.

== Squads ==
WODIs		WT20Is	
Sri Lanka	India	Sri Lanka	India
Chamari Athapaththu (c); Nilakshi de Silva; Kavisha Dilhari; Vishmi Gunaratne; Ama Kanchana; Hansima Karunaratne; Achini Kulasuriya; Sugandika Kumari; Kaushini Nuthyangana; Hasini Perera; Udeshika Prabodhani; Oshadi Ranasinghe; Inoka Ranaweera; Harshitha Samarawickrama; Sathya Sandeepani; Anushka Sanjeewani; Tharika Sewwandi; Malsha Shehani; Rashmi Silva	Harmanpreet Kaur (c); Smriti Mandhana (vc); Simran Bahadur; Taniya Bhatia (wk); Yastika Bhatia (wk); Harleen Deol; Rajeshwari Gayakwad; Richa Ghosh (wk); Sabbhineni Meghana; Deepti Sharma; Meghna Singh; Renuka Singh; Pooja Vastrakar; Shafali Verma; Poonam Yadav	Chamari Athapaththu (c); Nilakshi de Silva; Kavisha Dilhari; Vishmi Gunaratne; Ama Kanchana; Hansima Karunaratne; Achini Kulasuriya; Sugandika Kumari; Kaushini Nuthyangana; Hasini Perera; Udeshika Prabodhani; Oshadi Ranasinghe; Inoka Ranaweera; Harshitha Samarawickrama; Sathya Sandeepani; Anushka Sanjeewani; Tharika Sewwandi; Malsha Shehani; Rashmi Silva	Harmanpreet Kaur (c); Smriti Mandhana (vc); Simran Bahadur; Yastika Bhatia (wk); Rajeshwari Gayakwad; Richa Ghosh (wk); Sabbhineni Meghana; Jemimah Rodrigues; Deepti Sharma; Meghna Singh; Renuka Singh; Pooja Vastrakar; Shafali Verma; Poonam Yadav; Radha Yadav

== WT20I series ==
=== 1st WT20I ===
23 June 2022
14:00
Scorecard

India; 138/6 (20 overs)	v	Sri Lanka; 104/5 (20 overs)
Jemimah Rodrigues 36* (27); Inoka Ranaweera 3/30 (4 overs)		Kavisha Dilhari 47* (49); Radha Yadav 2/22 (4 overs)

India Women won by 34 runs
Rangiri Dambulla International Stadium, Dambulla
Umpires: Nimali Perera (SL) and Deepal Gunawardene (SL)
Player of the match: Jemimah Rodrigues (Ind)

- India Women won the toss and elected to bat.

=== 2nd WT20I ===
25 June 2022
14:00
Scorecard

Sri Lanka; 125/7 (20 overs)	v	India; 127/5 (19.1 overs)
Vishmi Gunaratne 45 (50); Deepti Sharma 2/34 (4 overs)		Smriti Mandhana 39 (34); Inoka Ranaweera 2/18 (4 overs)

India Women won by 5 wickets
Rangiri Dambulla International Stadium, Dambulla
Umpires: Deepal Gunawardene (SL) and Dedunu Silva (SL)
Player of the match: Harmanpreet Kaur (Ind)

- Sri Lanka Women won the toss and elected to bat.

=== 3rd WT20I ===
27 June 2022
14:00
Scorecard

India; 138/5 (20 overs)	v	Sri Lanka; 141/3 (17 overs)
Harmanpreet Kaur 39* (33); Oshadi Ranasinghe 1/13 (3 overs)		Chamari Athapaththu 80* (48); Renuka Singh 1/27 (4 overs)

Sri Lanka Women won by 7 wickets
Rangiri Dambulla International Stadium, Dambulla
Umpires: Nimali Perera (SL) and Ranmore Martinesz (SL)
Player of the match: Chamari Athapaththu (SL)

- India Women won the toss and elected to bat.
- Chamari Athapaththu became the first batter for Sri Lanka to score 2,000 runs in WT20Is.

== WODI series ==
=== 1st WODI ===
1 July 2022
10:00
Scorecard

Sri Lanka; 171 (48.2 overs)	v	India; 176/6 (38 overs)
Nilakshi de Silva 43 (63); Deepti Sharma 3/25 (8.2 overs)		Harmanpreet Kaur 44 (63); Inoka Ranaweera 4/39 (10 overs)

India Women won by 4 wickets
Pallekele International Cricket Stadium, Kandy
Umpires: Ranmore Martinesz (SL) and Prageeth Rambukwella (SL)
Player of the match: Deepti Sharma (Ind)

- Sri Lanka Women won the toss and elected to bat.
- Rashmi Silva (SL) made her WODI debut.
- Women's Championship points: India 2, Sri Lanka 0.

=== 2nd WODI ===
4 July 2022
10:00
Scorecard

Sri Lanka; 173 (50 overs)	v	India; 174/0 (25.4 overs)
Ama Kanchana 47* (83); Renuka Singh 4/28 (10 overs)		Smriti Mandhana 94* (83)

India Women won by 10 wickets
Pallekele International Cricket Stadium, Kandy
Umpires: Lyndon Hannibal (SL) and Prageeth Rambukwella (SL)
Player of the match: Renuka Singh (Ind)

- India Women won the toss and elected to field.
- Vishmi Gunaratne (SL) made her WODI debut.
- Women's Championship points: India 2, Sri Lanka 0.

=== 3rd WODI ===
7 July 2022
10:00
Scorecard

India; 255/9 (50 overs)	v	Sri Lanka; 216 (47.3 overs)
Harmanpreet Kaur 75 (88); Inoka Ranaweera 2/22 (10 overs)		Nilakshi de Silva 48* (59); Rajeshwari Gayakwad 3/36 (10 overs)

India Women won by 39 runs
Pallekele International Cricket Stadium, Kandy
Umpires: Ruchira Palliyaguruge (SL) and Raveendra Wimalasiri (SL)
Player of the match: Harmanpreet Kaur (Ind)

- Sri Lanka Women won the toss and elected to field.
- Women's Championship points: India 2, Sri Lanka 0.
