= ICC Women's Emerging Nations Trophy =

- Administrator: International Cricket Council (ICC)
- Format: Women's Twenty20 International (WT20I)
- First edition: 2025
- Latest edition: 2026
- Tournament format: Group stage and Final
- Number of teams: 10 (2026)
- Current champion: Thailand (1st title)
- Most successful: Thailand (1 title)

The ICC Women's Emerging Nations Trophy is an international women's Twenty20 International cricket tournament organised by the International Cricket Council (ICC) for emerging nations. It was launched in 2025 as part of a new three-tier development pathway for women's cricket, following the success of the 2025 Women's Cricket World Cup.

The inaugural edition was contested by eight Associate nations. The tournament was expanded to ten teams for its second edition in 2026, with five ICC Full Members joining five Associate Members for the first time.

== History ==
=== Creation ===
The ICC announced the Women's Emerging Nations Trophy in November 2025, alongside two other new women's tournaments, as part of its plan to "promote and expand women's cricket around the world" and provide high-performance exposure to emerging nations.

=== 2025: Inaugural edition ===
The inaugural edition was held in Bangkok, Thailand, from 20 to 30 November 2025. The eight participating teams were hosts Thailand, the Netherlands, Papua New Guinea, the United Arab Emirates, Scotland, Namibia, Tanzania and Uganda.

All eight sides faced each other once in a single round-robin league. Matches were played at the Terdthai Cricket Ground and the Asian Institute of Technology Ground in Bangkok. Thailand won the title on home soil after finishing level on points with Scotland, the Netherlands and the UAE, with net run rate determining the final standings.

=== 2026: Expansion to ten teams ===
The second edition was scheduled to be held in Ajman, United Arab Emirates, from 12 to 25 November 2026. For the first time, the tournament was expanded from eight to ten teams, including five ICC Full Members. The expansion was approved on the recommendation of the ICC Women's Cricket Committee and confirmed by the ICC Chief Executives' Committee.

== Results ==
Year	Host	No. of teams	Final				Player of the series
Year	Host	No. of teams	Venue	Winner	Result	Runner-up	Player of the series
2025	(Thailand)	8	No final	(Thailand); 10 points (NRR: 1.362)	Thailand won by number of points	(United Arab Emirates); 10 points (NRR: 1.278)	(United Arab Emirates) Esha Oza
2026	(United Arab Emirates)	10	Karwan Sports Club, Ajman				

== Teams performance ==
Legend

- W Winners
- RU Runners-up
- R2 Round 2 – Super six
- R1 Round 1 – Group stage
- Q Qualified
- — Did not participate
- DNQ Did not qualify
- ICC full member

Team performances in each Women's Emerging Nations Trophy tournament
Edition (No. of teams)	2025 (8)	2026 (10)	Apps
Host(s) Team	(Thailand)	(United Arab Emirates)	Apps
Bangladesh	—	R1	1
Ireland	—	Q	1
Namibia	R1	DNQ	1
Netherlands	R1	Q	2
Pakistan	—	Q	1
Papua New Guinea	R1	R1	2
Scotland	R1	R2	2
Sri Lanka	—	Q	1
Tanzania	R1	—	2
Thailand	W	R1	2
Uganda	R1	—	1
United Arab Emirates	RU	R1	2
Zimbabwe	—	R2	1

== See also ==
- ICC Women's T20 World Cup
- ICC Women's Cricket World Cup
- ICC Women's T20 World Cup Qualifier
- ICC Women's Championship
