= Anosha Nasir =

Pakistani cricketer (born 2005)

Personal information
- Born: 14 August 2005 (age 21); Karachi, Sindh, Pakistan
- Batting: Right handed
- Bowling: Slow left-arm orthodox
- Role: All-rounder

Domestic team information
- Years: Team
- 2024: Karachi

Career statistics
Competition	WLA	WT20
Matches	21	13
Runs scored	111	19
Batting average	12.33	19.00
100s/50s	0/0	0/0
Top score	30	11*
Balls bowled	1,042	281
Wickets	36	20
Bowling average	12.80	12.40
5 wickets in innings	1	0
10 wickets in match	0	0
Best bowling	5/37	4/19
Catches/stumpings	2/–	1/–
- Source: ESPNcricinfo, 17 March 2024

Anosha Nasir (born 14 August 2005) is a Pakistani cricketer. She played for Pakistan women's under-19 team in 2023 ICC Under-19 Women's T20 World Cup. She has also played domestic cricket for Karachi.

== Career ==
In December 2022, she was named in Pakistan's under-19 squad for 2023 ICC Under-19 Women's T20 World Cup. She took 10 wickets from the under-19 world cup, with average 11 and best bowling figure 3/32, which was comes against New Zealand.

In May 2023, she was named in Pakistan A squad for the 2023 ACC Women's T20 Emerging Teams Asia Cup. In July 2023, she was named in Pakistan's squad for the 2022 Asian Games squad. In August 2023, she was awarded a professional contract by Pakistan Cricket Board for 2023–25 season.

She played for PCB Challengers in Pakistan Cup Women's One-Day in 2021 and in T20 Women's Cricket Tournament (Phase II) in 2022. She played PCB Conquerors in T20 Women's Cricket Tournament (Phase I) in 2022. And also played for PCB Strikers in Pakistan Cup Women's Cricket Tournament (Phase I) in 2023.

In October 2023, she was named in Pakistan's A squad for the one-day series against West Indies A and for T20 Tri-series against West Indies A and Thailand A.
