= Rubya Haider =

Bangladeshi cricketer (born 1997)

Personal information
- Full name: Rubya Haider Jhelik
- Born: 22 July 1997 (age 29)
- Nickname: Jhelik
- Batting: Left-handed
- Role: Batter, Wicket-keeper

International information
- National side: Bangladesh (2023–present)
- ODI debut (cap 40): 2 October 2025 v Pakistan
- Last ODI: 26 October 2025 v India
- ODI shirt no.: 7
- T20I debut (cap 37): 9 May 2023 v Sri Lanka
- Last T20I: 20 July 2024 v Sri Lanka
- T20I shirt no.: 7

Domestic team information
- Years: Team
- 2012–2022: Khulna Division
- 2017/18: Barisal Division

Career statistics
| Competition | T20I | WLA | WT20 |
|---|---|---|---|
| Matches | 5 | 14 | 14 |
| Runs scored | 58 | 104 | 239 |
| Batting average | 11.60 | 11.55 | 18.38 |
| 100s/50s | 0/0 | 0/0 | 0/0 |
| Top score | 20 | 44 | 61 |
| Catches/stumpings | 0/– | 5/1 | 2/– |
- Source: CricketArchive, 11 May 2024

Rubya Haider Jhelik (born 22 July 1997) is a Bangladeshi cricketer who plays for the Bangladesh women's national cricket team as a wicket-keeper and left-hand batter.

== International career ==
In April 2023, she earned her maiden call-up for Bangladesh's T20I and ODI squads for the series against Sri Lanka. She made her Twenty20 International (T20I) debut against Sri Lanka in the same series on 9 May 2023.

In May 2023, she was selected to Bangladesh A team for the inaugural season of ACC Women's T20 Emerging Teams Asia Cup. Bangladesh A team finished as the runners-up in the tournament after a 31-run defeat by India A team in the final.

In July 2023, she was dropped from the T20I squad for the series against India, due to a knee injury.

In April 2024, she returned to the T20I squad for their series against India.
