= Eyman Fatima =

Pakistani cricketer (born 2004)

Personal information
- Born: 12 October 2004 (age 22); Sargodha, Punjab, Pakistan
- Batting: Right handed
- Bowling: Right-arm medium
- Role: Batter

International information
- National side: Pakistan
- ODI debut (cap 93): 22 September 2025 v South Africa
- Last ODI: 8 October 2025 v Australia
- ODI shirt no.: 39
- T20I debut (cap 57): 6 August 2025 v Ireland
- Last T20I: 8 August 2025 v Ireland
- T20I shirt no.: 39

Domestic team information
- Years: Team
- 2024: Lahore

Career statistics
Competition	T20I	LA	T20
Matches	2	17	25
Runs scored	27	506	572
Batting average	13.50	31.61	31.77
100s/50s	0/0	2/1	0/4
Top score	23	141	74*
Catches/stumpings	1/–	5/–	6/–
- Source: ESPNcricinfo, 8 August 2025

Eyman Fatima (born 12 October 2004) is a Pakistani cricketer. She has played for Pakistan women's under-19 team in 2023 ICC Under-19 Women's T20 World Cup. She has also played domestic cricket for Lahore and for PCB Strikers in National Women's T20 tournament and National Women's One-Day tournament.

== Career ==
In December 2022, Fatima named in Pakistan's under-19 squad for 2023 ICC Under-19 Women's T20 World Cup. She was Pakistan's leading run-scorer in the tournament, with 157 runs at an average of 52.33. Her best score was 65* against Rwanda.

In May 2023, she was named in Pakistan A squad for the 2023 ACC Women's T20 Emerging Teams Asia Cup. In August 2023, she was awarded a professional contract by Pakistan Cricket Board for 2023–25 season. In October 2023, she was named in Pakistan's A squad for the one-day series against West Indies A and for T20 Tri-series against West Indies A and Thailand A.

In March 2025, Fatima awarded domestic central contracts by PCB.

In July 2025, Fatima earned maiden call-up for Pakistan national cricket team for the T20I series against Ireland. She made her T20I debut on 6 August 2025 against Ireland.

In August 2025, she was awarded in category E (Emerging) in central contract for 2025–26.
