= Amy Hunter =

Amy Hunter can refer to:

- Amy Hunter (actress)
- Amy Hunter (Australian cricketer)
- Amy Hunter (Irish cricketer)
