= Women's Asia Cup Rising Stars =

Cricket tournament in Asia

ACC Women's Asia Cup Rising Stars
- Administrator: Asian Cricket Council
- Format: 20 overs, Twenty20, Twenty20 International
- First edition: 2023
- Latest edition: 2026
- Next edition: 2027
- Current champion: India A (2nd title)
- Most successful: India A (2 titles)
- Most runs: (Bangladesh) Murshida Khatun (59)
- Most wickets: (India) Shreyanka Patil (9)

Women's Asia Cup Rising Stars, formally known as ACC Women's T20 Emerging Teams Asia Cup is a Twenty20 cricket tournament. It was created by the Asian Cricket Council (ACC) to develop the talents of the most prominent female young cricketers of full members and associate nations in Asia.

== Results ==
Year	Host	Venue of the final	Final		
Year	Host	Venue of the final	Winner	Result	Runner-up
2023; Details	Hong Kong	Mission Road Ground, Kowloon	India A 127/7 (20 overs)	India A won by 31 runs Scorecard	Bangladesh A 96 (19.2 overs)
2026; Details	Thailand	Terdthai Cricket Ground, Bangkok	India A 134/7 (20 overs)	India A won by 46 runs Scorecard	Bangladesh A 88 (19.1 overs)

== Tournament summary ==
The table below provides an overview of the performances of teams over past tournaments.

Team	Appearances			Best result	Statistics					
Team	Total	First	Latest	Best result	Played	Won	Lost	Tie	NR	Win%
India A	1	2023	2023	Winner (2023, 2026)	10	6	1	0	3	60.00
Bangladesh A	1	2023	2023	Runner Up (2023, 2026)	5	2	1	0	2	40.00
Pakistan A	1	2023	2023	Semi Final (2023, 2026)	4	1	0	3	0	25.00
Sri Lanka A	1	2023	2023	Semi Final (2023, 2026)	4	1	1	2	0	25.00
United Arab Emirates	1	2023	2023	Group Stage (2023)	3	1	1	1	0	33.00
Nepal	1	2023	2023	Group Stage (2023)	3	0	1	0	2	0
Hong Kong	1	2023	2023	Group Stage (2023)	3	0	1	0	2	0
Malaysia	1	2023	2023	Group Stage (2023)	3	0	2	0	1	0

== Teams performance ==
An overview of the teams' performances in every ACC Emerging Teams Asia Cup:

Legend	Meaning
1st	Champion
2nd	Runner-up
SF	Semi-finalist
DNQ	Did not qualify
Q	Qualified
WD	Withdrawn
GS	Group stage
	ICC Full Member Nation

Team \ Host	2023	2026
Team \ Host	(Hong Kong)	(Thailand)
Bangladesh A	2nd	2nd
Hong Kong	GS	DNQ
India A	1st	1st
Malaysia	GS	GS
Nepal	GS	GS
Pakistan A	SF	SF
Sri Lanka A	SF	SF
Thailand	WD	GS
United Arab Emirates	GS	GS

== Debutant teams ==
Year	Teams
2023	Bangladesh A, Hong Kong, India A, Malaysia, Nepal, Pakistan A, Sri Lanka A, United Arab Emirates

== See also ==
- Asia Cup
- ACC Under-19 Cup
- ACC Emerging Teams Asia Cup
