= Madushika Methtananda =

Sri Lankan cricketer (born 1994)

Personal information
- Full name: Ampitiya Rajapakshe Gedera Madushika lakmali Methtananda
- Born: 24 July 1994 (age 32); Wattegama, Sri Lanka
- Height: 5 ft 2 in (1.57 m)
- Batting: Right-handed
- Bowling: Right-arm medium

International information
- National side: Sri Lanka
- Only T20I (cap 47): 28 March 2019 v England
- Source: Cricinfo, 28 March 2019

Madushika Methtananda (born 24 July 1994) is a Sri Lankan cricketer. In March 2019, she was named in Sri Lanka's squad for their series against England. She made her Women's Twenty20 International cricket (WT20I) debut against England Women on 28 March 2019.

In October 2021, she was named as one of five reserve players in Sri Lanka's team for the 2021 Women's Cricket World Cup Qualifier tournament in Zimbabwe. In January 2022, she was named as one of four reserve players in Sri Lanka's team for the 2022 Commonwealth Games Cricket Qualifier tournament in Malaysia.
