= Rashmi Silva =

Sri Lankan cricketer

Personal information
- Full name: Hanthana Dewage Rashmi Sewandi Silva
- Born: 4 December 2000 (age 25); Colombo, Sri Lanka
- Batting: Right-handed
- Bowling: Right-arm leg break
- Role: Bowler

International information
- National side: Sri Lanka
- ODI debut (cap 74): 1 July 2022 v India
- Last ODI: 7 July 2022 v India

Domestic team information
- Years: Team
- 2021/22–present: Sri Lanka Navy Sports Club

Career statistics
| Competition | WODI |
|---|---|
| Matches | 2 |
| Runs scored | 25 |
| Batting average | 12.50 |
| 100s/50s | 0/0 |
| Top score | 18 |
| Balls bowled | 72 |
| Wickets | 2 |
| Bowling average | 41.50 |
| 5 wickets in innings | 0 |
| 10 wickets in match | 0 |
| Best bowling | 2/53 |
| Catches/stumpings | 0/– |
- Source: Cricinfo, 4 February 2023

Hanthana Dewage Rashmi Sewandi Silva (born 4 December 2000, known as Rashmi Silva) is a Sri Lankan cricketer who currently plays for Sri Lanka Navy Sports Club and Sri Lanka.

== International career ==
In June 2022, Silva was named in Sri Lanka's Women's One Day International squad for the series against India. She made her WODI debut on 1 July 2022 against India.

She was part of Sri Lanka's team for the cricket tournament at the 2022 Commonwealth Games in Birmingham, England.
