= Shawaal Zulfiqar =

Pakistani cricketer (born 2005)

Personal information
- Born: 27 June 2005 (age 21)
- Batting: Right handed
- Bowling: Right arm Offbreak
- Role: Batter

International information
- National side: Pakistan (2023-present)
- ODI debut (cap 89): 8 September 2023 v South Africa
- Last ODI: 19 April 2025 v Bangladesh
- ODI shirt no.: 26
- T20I debut (cap 52): 1 September 2023 v South Africa
- Last T20I: 3 December 2023 v New Zealand

Career statistics
Competition	WODI	WT20I
Matches	1	3
Runs scored	7	33
Batting average	7	11
100s/50s	0/0	0/0
Top score	7	18
Catches/stumpings	–/–	–/–
- Source: ESPNcricinfo, 19 September 2023

Shawaal Zulfiqar (born 27 June 2005) is a Pakistani cricketer who plays as a right-handed batter and right-arm off break bowler.

== International career ==
Shawaal represented Pakistan women's under-19 cricket team in the inaugural edition of the ICC Under-19 Women's T20 World Cup in South Africa in January 2023. In July 2023, she was named in Pakistan's squad for the 2022 Asian Games. In August 2023, she was awarded a central contract by the Pakistan Cricket Board (PCB). In August 2023, she was named in Pakistan's squad for the T20I series against South Africa. She made her Women's Twenty20 International (WT20I) debut for Pakistan, against South Africa, on 1 September 2023. In September 2023, she was named in Pakistan's squad for the Women's One Day International (WODI) series against South Africa. She made her WODI debut against South Africa, on 8 September 2023.

Zulfiqar was part of the Pakistan squad for the 2025 Women's Cricket World Cup Qualifier at home in April 2025.
