= Sathya Sandeepani =

Sri Lankan cricketer (born 1999)

Personal information
- Born: 27 August 1999 (age 27); Galle, Sri Lanka
- Batting: Right-handed
- Bowling: Right-arm fast(medium)
- Role: All-rounder

International information
- National side: Sri Lanka
- Only T20I (cap 48): 29 February 2020 v India
Medal record
Representing Sri Lanka
Women's Cricket
South Asian Games
| Silver medal – second place | 2019 Kathmandu/Pokhara | Team |
- Source: Cricinfo, 11 June 2021

Sathya Sandeepani (born 27 August 1999) is a Sri Lankan cricketer. In December 2019, she played for Sri Lanka in the women's tournament at the 2019 South Asian Games. The Sri Lankan team won the silver medal for being the runners-up, losing to Bangladesh by two runs in the final.

In January 2020, she was selected in Sri Lanka's squad for the 2020 ICC Women's T20 World Cup. She made her Women's Twenty20 International (WT20I) debut for Sri Lanka, against India, on 29 February 2020.

In October 2021, she was named as one of five reserve players in Sri Lanka's team for the 2021 Women's Cricket World Cup Qualifier tournament in Zimbabwe. In January 2022, she was named as one of four reserve players in Sri Lanka's team for the 2022 Commonwealth Games Cricket Qualifier tournament in Malaysia.
