= 2024 Women's T20 World Cup squads =

List of cricketers

The 2024 ICC Women's T20 World Cup was held in the United Arab Emirates in October 2024.

Pakistan were the first to name their squad on 25 August 2024. The following squads were announced for the tournament.

== Australia ==
- Squad announcement date: 26 August 2024
- Source: Cricket Australia
- Coach: (Australia) Shelley Nitschke

No.	Player	Birth date	Batting style	Bowling style
Batters
18	Phoebe Litchfield	18 April 2003 (age 23)	Left handed	Right-arm leg break
Wicket-keepers
77	Alyssa Healy (c)	24 March 1990 (age 36)	Right handed	—N/a
6	Beth Mooney	14 January 1994 (age 32)	Left handed	—N/a
All-rounders
32	Tahlia McGrath (vc)	10 November 1995 (age 30)	Right handed	Right-arm medium-fast
63	Ashleigh Gardner	15 April 1997 (age 29)	Right handed	Right-arm off break
11	Heather Graham (Note: Tayla Vlaeminck was ruled out of the remainder of the tournament due to dislocation of her right shoulder and was replaced by Heather Graham.)	5 October 1996 (age 29)	Right handed	Right-arm medium-fast
48	Grace Harris	18 September 1993 (age 33)	Right handed	Right-arm off break
8	Ellyse Perry	3 November 1990 (age 35)	Right handed	Right-arm medium-fast
14	Annabel Sutherland	12 October 2001 (age 24)	Right handed	Right-arm medium-fast
Spin bowlers
27	Alana King	22 November 1995 (age 30)	Right handed	Right-arm leg break
23	Sophie Molineux	17 January 1998 (age 28)	Left handed	Slow left-arm orthodox
35	Georgia Wareham	26 May 1999 (age 27)	Right handed	Right-arm leg break
Pace bowlers
5	Darcie Brown	7 March 2003 (age 23)	Right handed	Right-arm fast
34	Kim Garth	25 April 1996 (age 30)	Right handed	Right-arm medium-fast
3	Megan Schutt	15 January 1993 (age 33)	Right handed	Right-arm medium-fast
30	Tayla Vlaeminck	27 October 1998 (age 27)	Right handed	Right-arm medium-fast

== Bangladesh ==
- Squad announcement date: 18 September 2024
- Source: Bangladesh Cricket Board
- Coach: (Sri Lanka) Hashan Tillakaratne

No.	Player	Birth date	Batting style	Bowling style
Batters
75	Murshida Khatun	7 July 1999 (age 27)	Left handed	—N/a
6	Sobhana Mostary	13 February 2002 (age 24)	Right handed	Right-arm medium
73	Taj Nehar	3 October 1997 (age 28)	Right handed	Right-arm off break
41	Shathi Rani	19 June 1998 (age 28)	Right handed	—N/a
Wicket-keepers
1	Nigar Sultana (c)	1 August 1997 (age 29)	Right handed	—N/a
92	Dilara Akter	6 April 2004 (age 22)	Right handed	—N/a
All-rounders
11	Shorna Akter	1 January 2007 (age 19)	Right handed	Right-arm leg break
	Disha Biswas	3 April 2004 (age 22)	Right handed	Right-arm fast-medium
2	Rabeya Khan	11 March 2005 (age 21)	Right handed	Right-arm leg break
88	Ritu Moni	5 February 1993 (age 33)	Right handed	Right-arm medium
Spin bowlers
32	Nahida Akter	2 March 2000 (age 26)	Right handed	Slow left-arm orthodox
9	Fahima Khatun	2 November 1992 (age 33)	Right handed	Right-arm leg break
29	Sultana Khatun	5 February 1996 (age 30)	Right handed	Right-arm off break
Pace bowlers
90	Marufa Akter	1 January 2005 (age 21)	Right handed	Right-arm medium-fast
26	Jahanara Alam	1 April 1994 (age 32)	Right handed	Right-arm medium

== England ==
- Squad announcement date: 27 August 2024
- Source: England and Wales Cricket Board
- Coach: (England) Jon Lewis

No.	Player	Birth date	Batting style	Bowling style
Batters
5	Heather Knight (c)	26 December 1990 (age 35)	Right handed	Right-arm off break
14	Maia Bouchier	5 December 1998 (age 27)	Right handed	Right-arm medium
47	Sophia Dunkley	16 June 1998 (age 28)	Right handed	Right-arm leg break
28	Danni Wyatt-Hodge	22 April 1991 (age 35)	Right handed	Right-arm off break
Wicket-keepers
10	Bess Heath	20 August 2001 (age 25)	Right handed	—N/a
40	Amy Jones	13 June 1993 (age 33)	Right handed	—N/a
All-rounders
64	Alice Capsey	11 August 2004 (age 22)	Right handed	Right-arm off break
66	Danielle Gibson	30 April 2001 (age 25)	Right handed	Right-arm medium
39	Nat Sciver-Brunt	20 August 1992 (age 34)	Right handed	Right-arm off break
Spin bowlers
24	Charlie Dean	22 December 2000 (age 25)	Right handed	Right-arm off break
19	Sophie Ecclestone	6 May 1999 (age 27)	Right handed	Slow left-arm orthodox
3	Sarah Glenn	27 August 1999 (age 27)	Right handed	Right-arm leg break
50	Linsey Smith	10 March 1995 (age 31)	Left handed	Slow left-arm orthodox
Pace bowlers
63	Lauren Bell	2 January 2001 (age 25)	Right handed	Right-arm medium-fast
74	Freya Kemp	21 April 2005 (age 21)	Left handed	Left-arm medium-fast

== India ==
- Squad announcement date: 27 August 2024
- Source: Board of Control for Cricket in India
- Coach: (India) Amol Muzumdar

No.	Player	Birth date	Batting style	Bowling style
Batters
18	Smriti Mandhana (vc)	18 July 1996 (age 30)	Left handed	Right-arm medium
9	Dayalan Hemalatha	29 September 1994 (age 32)	Right handed	Right-arm off break
5	Jemimah Rodrigues	5 September 2000 (age 26)	Right handed	Right-arm off break
17	Shafali Verma	28 January 2004 (age 22)	Right handed	Right-arm off break
Wicket-keepers
19	Yastika Bhatia	1 November 2000 (age 25)	Left handed	—N/a
13	Richa Ghosh	28 September 2003 (age 23)	Right handed	—N/a
All-rounders
7	Harmanpreet Kaur (c)	8 March 1989 (age 37)	Right handed	Right-arm off break
44	Sajeevan Sajana	4 January 1995 (age 31)	Right handed	Right-arm off break
6	Deepti Sharma	24 August 1997 (age 29)	Left handed	Right-arm off break
4	Asha Sobhana	16 March 1991 (age 35)	Right handed	Right-arm leg break
Spin bowlers
31	Shreyanka Patil	31 July 2002 (age 24)	Right handed	Right-arm off break
21	Radha Yadav	21 April 2000 (age 26)	Right handed	Slow left-arm orthodox
Pace bowlers
20	Arundhati Reddy	4 October 1997 (age 28)	Right handed	Right-arm medium-fast
10	Renuka Singh Thakur	2 January 1996 (age 30)	Right handed	Right-arm medium-fast
34	Pooja Vastrakar	25 September 1999 (age 27)	Right handed	Right-arm medium-fast

Uma Chetry, Tanuja Kanwar, and Saima Thakor were named as travelling reserves whereas Raghvi Bist and Priya Mishra were named as non-travelling reserves.

== New Zealand ==
- Squad announcement date: 10 September 2024
- Source: New Zealand Cricket
- Coach: (Australia) Ben Sawyer

No.	Player	Birth date	Batting style	Bowling style
Batters
5	Maddy Green	20 October 1992 (age 33)	Right handed	Right-arm off break
58	Georgia Plimmer	8 February 2004 (age 22)	Right handed	Right-arm medium
Wicket-keepers
13	Izzy Gaze	8 May 2004 (age 22)	Right handed	—N/a
All-rounders
77	Sophie Devine (c)	1 September 1989 (age 37)	Right handed	Right-arm medium
23	Suzie Bates	16 September 1987 (age 39)	Right handed	Right-arm medium
68	Brooke Halliday	30 October 1995 (age 30)	Left handed	Right-arm medium
62	Leigh Kasperek	15 February 1992 (age 34)	Right handed	Right-arm off break
48	Amelia Kerr	13 October 2000 (age 25)	Right handed	Right-arm leg break
Spin bowlers
4	Eden Carson	8 August 2001 (age 25)	Right handed	Right-arm off break
26	Fran Jonas	8 April 2005 (age 21)	Right handed	Slow left-arm orthodox
Pace bowlers
24	Jess Kerr	18 January 1998 (age 28)	Right handed	Right-arm medium
32	Rosemary Mair	17 November 1998 (age 27)	Right handed	Right-arm medium
15	Molly Penfold	15 June 2001 (age 25)	Right handed	Right-arm medium
74	Hannah Rowe	3 October 1996 (age 29)	Right handed	Right-arm medium
6	Lea Tahuhu	23 September 1990 (age 36)	Right handed	Right-arm medium-fast

== Pakistan ==
- Squad announcement date: 25 August 2024
- Source: Pakistan Cricket Board
- Coach: (Pakistan) Mohammad Wasim

No.	Player	Birth date	Batting style	Bowling style
Batters
31	Sidra Ameen	7 April 1992 (age 34)	Right handed	Right-arm medium-fast
16	Iram Javed	16 December 1991 (age 34)	Right handed	Right-arm medium-fast
18	Sadaf Shamas	30 December 1998 (age 27)	Right handed	Right-arm medium
11	Omaima Sohail	11 July 1997 (age 29)	Right handed	Right-arm off break
Wicket-keepers
17	Muneeba Ali	8 August 1997 (age 29)	Left handed	—N/a
25	Najiha Alvi (Note: Diana Baig was ruled out of the remainder of the tournament due to an injury sustained to her right calf muscle and was replaced by Najiha Alvi.)	9 December 2002 (age 23)	Right handed	—N/a
56	Gull Feroza	28 December 1998 (age 27)	Right handed	—N/a
All-rounders
14	Fatima Sana (c)	8 November 2001 (age 24)	Right handed	Right-arm medium
8	Nida Dar	2 January 1987 (age 39)	Right handed	Right-arm off break
37	Aliya Riaz	24 September 1992 (age 34)	Right handed	Right-arm off break
2	Syeda Aroob Shah	31 December 2003 (age 22)	Right handed	Right-arm leg break
Spin bowlers
72	Tuba Hassan	18 October 2000 (age 25)	Right handed	Right-arm leg break
45	Sadia Iqbal	5 August 1995 (age 31)	Left handed	Slow left-arm orthodox
6	Nashra Sandhu	19 November 1997 (age 28)	Right handed	Slow left-arm orthodox
Pace bowlers
42	Diana Baig	15 October 1995 (age 30)	Right handed	Right-arm medium-fast
10	Tasmia Rubab	20 December 2002 (age 23)	Right handed	Left-arm medium-fast

Najiha Alvi was named as travelling reserve whereas Rameen Shamim and Umm-e-Hani were named as non-travelling reserves.

== Scotland ==
- Squad announcement date: 2 September 2024
- Source: Cricket Scotland
- Coach: (Scotland) Craig Wallace

No.	Player	Birth date	Batting style	Bowling style
Batters
91	Abbi Aitken-Drummond	11 April 1991 (age 35)	Right handed	Right-arm medium
15	Megan McColl	15 November 2000 (age 25)	Right handed	Right-arm medium
Wicket-keepers
6	Sarah Bryce (vc)	8 January 2000 (age 26)	Right handed	—N/a
10	Lorna Jack-Brown	24 November 1992 (age 33)	Right handed	—N/a
23	Ailsa Lister	8 April 2004 (age 22)	Right handed	—N/a
All-rounders
17	Kathryn Bryce (c)	17 November 1997 (age 28)	Right handed	Right-arm medium
18	Olivia Bell	12 November 2003 (age 22)	Right handed	Right-arm off break
11	Darcey Carter	31 May 2005 (age 21)	Right handed	Right-arm off break
70	Katherine Fraser	9 April 2005 (age 21)	Right handed	Right-arm off break
13	Saskia Horley	23 February 2000 (age 26)	Right handed	Right-arm off break
Spin bowlers
9	Abtaha Maqsood	11 June 1999 (age 27)	Right handed	Right-arm leg break
Pace bowlers
22	Chloe Abel	3 December 2003 (age 22)	Right handed	Right-arm medium
7	Priyanaz Chatterji	12 August 1993 (age 33)	Right handed	Right-arm medium
26	Hannah Rainey	2 June 1997 (age 29)	Right handed	Right-arm medium
72	Rachel Slater	20 November 2001 (age 24)	Right handed	Left-arm medium

== South Africa ==
- Squad announcement date: 3 September 2024
- Source: Cricket South Africa
- Coach: (South Africa) Dillon du Preez

No.	Player	Birth date	Batting style	Bowling style
Batters
14	Laura Wolvaardt (c)	26 April 1999 (age 27)	Right handed	—N/a
1	Tazmin Brits	8 January 1991 (age 35)	Right handed	—N/a
Wicket-keepers
19	Mieke de Ridder	19 January 1996 (age 30)	Right handed	—N/a
10	Sinalo Jafta	22 December 1994 (age 31)	Right handed	—N/a
All-rounders
27	Anneke Bosch	17 August 1993 (age 33)	Right handed	Right-arm medium, Right-arm off break
32	Nadine de Klerk	16 January 2000 (age 26)	Right handed	Right-arm medium
77	Annerie Dercksen	26 April 2001 (age 25)	Right handed	Right-arm medium
7	Marizanne Kapp	4 January 1990 (age 36)	Right handed	Right-arm medium
96	Suné Luus	5 January 1996 (age 30)	Right handed	Right-arm leg break
25	Chloe Tryon	25 January 1994 (age 32)	Right handed	Slow left-arm orthodox
Spin bowlers
28	Nonkululeko Mlaba	27 June 2000 (age 26)	Right handed	Slow left-arm orthodox
21	Seshnie Naidu	5 January 2006 (age 20)	Right handed	Right-arm leg break
Pace bowlers
17	Ayanda Hlubi	16 July 2004 (age 22)	Right handed	Right-arm medium
99	Ayabonga Khaka	18 July 1992 (age 34)	Right handed	Right-arm medium
12	Tumi Sekhukhune	21 November 1998 (age 27)	Left handed	Right-arm fast-medium

Miané Smit was named as travelling reserve.

== Sri Lanka ==
- Squad announcement date: 20 September 2024
- Source: Sri Lanka Cricket
- Coach: (Sri Lanka) Rumesh Ratnayake

No.	Player	Birth date	Batting style	Bowling style
Batters
27	Nilakshi de Silva	27 September 1989 (age 37)	Right handed	Right-arm slow-medium
62	Vishmi Gunaratne	22 August 2005 (age 21)	Right handed	Right-arm medium-fast
72	Hasini Perera	27 June 1995 (age 31)	Left handed	Right-arm medium-fast
88	Harshitha Samarawickrama	29 June 1998 (age 28)	Right handed	Right-arm slow-medium
Wicket-keepers
17	Anushka Sanjeewani	24 January 1990 (age 36)	Right handed	—N/a
All-rounders
58	Chamari Athapaththu (c)	9 February 1990 (age 36)	Left handed	Right-arm off break
6	Kavisha Dilhari	24 January 2001 (age 25)	Right handed	Right-arm off break Right-arm leg break
97	Ama Kanchana	7 April 1991 (age 35)	Right handed	Right-arm fast-medium
Spin bowlers
21	Shashini Gimhani	9 December 2008 (age 17)	Right handed	Slow left-arm wrist spin
91	Sugandika Kumari	5 October 1991 (age 34)	Left handed	Slow left-arm orthodox
11	Sachini Nisansala	11 November 2001 (age 24)	Left handed	Slow left-arm orthodox
52	Inoshi Priyadharshani	23 March 1987 (age 39)	Right handed	Right-arm off break
18	Inoka Ranaweera	18 February 1986 (age 40)	Left handed	Slow left-arm orthodox
Pace bowlers
22	Achini Kulasuriya	7 June 1990 (age 36)	Left handed	Right-arm fast-medium
55	Udeshika Prabodhani	20 September 1985 (age 41)	Right handed	Left-arm medium

Kaushini Nuthyangana was named as travelling reserve.

== West Indies ==
- Squad announcement date: 29 August 2024
- Source: Cricket West Indies
- Coach: (Australia) Shane Deitz

No.	Player	Birth date	Batting style	Bowling style
Batters
99	Mandy Mangru	22 September 1999 (age 27)	Right handed	Right-arm off break
Wicket-keepers
30	Shemaine Campbelle (vc)	1 November 2000 (age 25)	Right handed	Right-arm medium-fast
8	Chedean Nation	31 October 1986 (age 39)	Right handed	Right-arm medium-fast
All-rounders
50	Hayley Matthews (c)	19 March 1998 (age 28)	Right handed	Right-arm off break
5	Deandra Dottin	21 June 1991 (age 35)	Right handed	Right-arm medium-fast
48	Chinelle Henry	17 August 1995 (age 31)	Right handed	Right-arm medium-fast
55	Zaida James	30 October 2004 (age 21)	Left handed	Slow left-arm orthodox
75	Ashmini Munisar	7 December 2003 (age 22)	Right handed	Right-arm off break
7	Stafanie Taylor	11 June 1991 (age 35)	Right handed	Right-arm off break
Spin bowlers
9	Afy Fletcher	17 March 1997 (age 29)	Right handed	Right-arm leg break
73	Qiana Joseph	1 January 2001 (age 25)	Left handed	Slow left-arm orthodox
77	Karishma Ramharack	20 January 1995 (age 31)	Left handed	Right-arm off break
Pace bowlers
78	Aaliyah Alleyne	11 November 1994 (age 31)	Right handed	Right-arm medium
46	Shamilia Connell	14 July 1992 (age 34)	Right handed	Right-arm fast
32	Nerissa Crafton	23 July 1998 (age 28)	Left handed	Left-arm medium
