= 2025 Women's Cricket World Cup squads =

List of cricketers

These were the squads that were named for the 2025 Women's Cricket World Cup. Each team will select a squad of 15 players for the World Cup, excluding reserves. On 19 August 2025, India became the first team to announce their squad for the tournament.

== Key ==
Symbol	Meaning
S/N	Shirt number of the player in ODI
Player	Player name, as used on their own Wikipedia article. Also shows if they are team's designated captain or vice-captain.
Date of Birth	Date of birth, and age as of 30 September 2025.
Batting style	Hand they bat with
Bowling style	Type(s) of bowling employed

== Australia ==
- Squad announcement date: 5 September 2025
- Source: Cricket Australia
- Coach: (Australia) Shelley Nitschke

S/N	Player	Date of birth (age)	Batting style	Bowling style
Batters
18	Phoebe Litchfield	18 April 2003 (aged 22)	Left handed	Right-arm leg break
13	Georgia Voll	5 August 2003 (aged 22)	Right handed	Right-arm off break
Wicket-keepers
77	Alyssa Healy (c)	24 March 1990 (aged 35)	Right handed	—N/a
6	Beth Mooney	14 January 1994 (aged 31)	Left handed	—N/a
All-rounders
32	Tahlia McGrath (vc)	10 November 1995 (aged 29)	Right handed	Right-arm medium
63	Ashleigh Gardner	15 April 1997 (aged 28)	Right handed	Right-arm off break
34	Kim Garth	25 April 1996 (aged 29)	Right handed	Right-arm medium-fast
11	Heather Graham (Note: On 23 September, Grace Harris was ruled out of the tournament with a calf strain and was replaced by Heather Graham.)	5 October 1996 (aged 28)	Right handed	Right-arm medium-fast
~~48~~	~~Grace Harris~~	~~18 September 1993 (aged 32)~~	~~Right handed~~	~~Right-arm off break~~
8	Ellyse Perry	3 November 1990 (aged 34)	Right handed	Right-arm medium-fast
14	Annabel Sutherland	12 October 2001 (aged 23)	Right handed	Right-arm medium-fast
Spin bowlers
27	Alana King	22 November 1995 (aged 29)	Right handed	Right-arm leg break
23	Sophie Molineux	17 January 1998 (aged 27)	Left handed	Slow left-arm orthodox
35	Georgia Wareham	26 May 1999 (aged 26)	Right handed	Right-arm leg break
Pace bowlers
5	Darcie Brown	7 March 2003 (aged 22)	Right handed	Right-arm fast
3	Megan Schutt	15 January 1993 (aged 32)	Right handed	Right-arm medium-fast

== Bangladesh ==
- Squad announcement date: 23 August 2025
- Source: Bangladesh Cricket Board
- Coach: (Bangladesh) Sarwar Imran

S/N	Player	Date of birth (age)	Batting style	Bowling style
Batters
14	Sharmin Akhter	31 December 1995 (aged 29)	Right handed	—N/a
99	Fargana Hoque	19 March 1993 (aged 32)	Right handed	—N/a
6	Sobhana Mostary	13 February 2002 (aged 23)	Right handed	Right-arm off break
Wicket-keepers
1	Nigar Sultana (c)	1 August 1997 (aged 28)	Right handed	—N/a
7	Rubya Haider	22 July 1997 (aged 28)	Left handed	—N/a
All-rounders
11	Shorna Akter	1 January 2007 (aged 18)	Right handed	Right-arm leg break
5	Sumaiya Akter	15 October 2005 (aged 19)	Right handed	Right-arm off break
2	Rabeya Khan	11 March 2005 (aged 20)	Right handed	Right-arm leg break
88	Ritu Moni	5 February 1993 (aged 32)	Right handed	Right-arm medium
Spin bowlers
32	Nahida Akter (vc)	2 March 2000 (aged 25)	Right handed	Slow left-arm orthodox
9	Fahima Khatun	2 November 1992 (aged 32)	Right handed	Right-arm leg break
42	Sanjida Akter Meghla	4 June 2001 (aged 24)	Right handed	Slow left-arm orthodox
12	Nishita Akter Nishi	19 June 2008 (aged 17)	Right handed	Right-arm off break
Pace bowlers
90	Marufa Akter	1 January 2005 (aged 20)	Right handed	Right-arm medium-fast
77	Fariha Trisna	13 September 2002 (aged 23)	Right handed	Left-arm medium

== England ==
- Squad announcement date: 21 August 2025
- Source: England and Wales Cricket Board
- Coach: (England) Charlotte Edwards

S/N	Player	Date of birth (age)	Batting style	Bowling style
Batters
12	Tammy Beaumont	11 March 1991 (aged 34)	Right handed	—N/a
47	Sophia Dunkley	16 June 1998 (aged 27)	Right handed	Right-arm leg break
5	Heather Knight	26 December 1990 (aged 34)	Right handed	Right-arm off break
6	Emma Lamb	16 December 1997 (aged 27)	Right handed	Right-arm off break
28	Danni Wyatt-Hodge	22 April 1991 (aged 34)	Right handed	Right-arm off break
Wicket-keepers
40	Amy Jones	13 June 1993 (aged 32)	Right handed	—N/a
All-rounders
39	Nat Sciver-Brunt (c)	20 August 1992 (aged 33)	Right handed	Right-arm medium
64	Alice Capsey	11 August 2004 (aged 21)	Right handed	Right-arm off break
Spin bowlers
24	Charlie Dean	22 December 2000 (aged 24)	Right handed	Right-arm off break
19	Sophie Ecclestone	6 May 1999 (aged 26)	Right handed	Slow left-arm orthodox
3	Sarah Glenn	27 August 1999 (aged 26)	Right handed	Right-arm leg break
50	Linsey Smith	10 March 1995 (aged 30)	Left handed	Slow left-arm orthodox
Pace bowlers
37	Emily Arlott	23 February 1998 (aged 27)	Right handed	Right-arm medium
63	Lauren Bell	2 January 2001 (aged 24)	Right handed	Right-arm medium-fast
82	Lauren Filer	22 December 2000 (aged 24)	Right handed	Right-arm fast

== India ==
- Squad announcement date: 19 August 2025
- Source: Board of Control for Cricket in India
- Coach: (India) Amol Muzumdar

S/N	Player	Date of birth (age)	Batting style	Bowling style
Batters
18	Smriti Mandhana (vc)	18 July 1996 (aged 29)	Left handed	Right-arm medium
33	Harleen Deol	21 June 1998 (aged 27)	Right handed	Right-arm leg break
64	Pratika Rawal (Note: On 27 October, Pratika Rawal was ruled out of the tournament due to a knee and ankle injury and was replaced by Shafali Verma.)	1 September 2000 (aged 25)	Right handed	Right-arm off break
5	Jemimah Rodrigues	5 September 2000 (aged 25)	Right handed	Right-arm off break
17	Shafali Verma	28 January 2004 (aged 21)	Right handed	Right-arm off break
Wicket-keepers
~~19~~	~~Yastika Bhatia~~ (Note: On 4 September, Yastika Bhatia was ruled out of the tournament due to a left knee injury and was replaced by Uma Chetry.)	~~1 November 2000 (aged 24)~~	~~Left handed~~	—N/a
55	Uma Chetry	27 July 2002 (aged 23)	Right handed	—N/a
13	Richa Ghosh	28 September 2003 (aged 22)	Right handed	—N/a
All-rounders
23	Harmanpreet Kaur (c)	8 March 1989 (aged 36)	Right handed	Right-arm off break
30	Amanjot Kaur	25 August 2000 (aged 25)	Right handed	Right-arm medium
6	Deepti Sharma	24 August 1997 (aged 28)	Left handed	Right-arm off break
Spin bowlers
40	Shree Charani	4 August 2004 (aged 21)	Left handed	Slow left-arm orthodox
2	Sneh Rana	18 February 1994 (aged 31)	Right handed	Right-arm off break
21	Radha Yadav	21 April 2000 (aged 25)	Right handed	Slow left-arm orthodox
Pace bowlers
26	Kranti Gaud	11 August 2003 (aged 22)	Right handed	Right-arm medium-fast
20	Arundhati Reddy	4 October 1997 (aged 27)	Right handed	Right-arm medium-fast
10	Renuka Singh Thakur	2 January 1996 (aged 29)	Right handed	Right-arm medium-fast

Tejal Hasabnis, Prema Rawat, Priya Mishra, Sayali Satghare and Minnu Mani were named as reserves.

== New Zealand ==
- Squad announcement date: 10 September 2025
- Source: New Zealand Cricket
- Coach: (Australia) Ben Sawyer

S/N	Player	Date of birth (age)	Batting style	Bowling style
Batters
5	Maddy Green	20 October 1992 (aged 32)	Right handed	Right-arm off break
58	Georgia Plimmer	8 February 2004 (aged 21)	Right handed	Right-arm medium
Wicket-keepers
13	Izzy Gaze	8 May 2004 (aged 21)	Right handed	—N/a
29	Polly Inglis	31 May 1996 (aged 29)	Right handed	Right-arm medium
11	Bella James	27 January 1999 (aged 26)	Right handed	—N/a
All-rounders
77	Sophie Devine (c)	1 September 1989 (aged 36)	Right handed	Right-arm medium
23	Suzie Bates	16 September 1987 (aged 38)	Right handed	Right-arm medium
27	~~Flora Devonshire~~ (Note: On 4 October, Flora Devonshire was ruled out of the tournament due to a hand injury and was replaced by Hannah Rowe.)	~~13 February 2003 (aged 22)~~	~~Left handed~~	~~Slow left-arm orthodox~~
68	Brooke Halliday	30 October 1995 (aged 29)	Left handed	Right-arm medium
48	Amelia Kerr	13 October 2000 (aged 24)	Right handed	Right-arm leg break
Spin bowlers
4	Eden Carson	8 August 2001 (aged 24)	Right handed	Right-arm off break
Pace bowlers
92	Bree Illing	29 September 2003 (aged 22)	Left handed	Left-arm medium
24	Jess Kerr	18 January 1998 (aged 27)	Right handed	Right-arm medium
32	Rosemary Mair	7 November 1998 (aged 26)	Right handed	Right-arm medium
74	Hannah Rowe	3 October 1996 (aged 28)	Right handed	Right-arm medium
6	Lea Tahuhu	23 September 1990 (aged 35)	Right handed	Right-arm medium-fast

== Pakistan ==
- Squad announcement date: 25 August 2025
- Source: Pakistan Cricket Board
- Coach: (Pakistan) Mohammad Wasim

S/N	Player	Date of birth (age)	Batting style	Bowling style
Batters
31	Sidra Ameen	7 April 1992 (aged 33)	Right handed	Right-arm medium-fast
39	Eyman Fatima	12 October 2004 (aged 20)	Right handed	Right-arm medium
18	Sadaf Shamas	30 December 1998 (aged 26)	Right handed	Right-arm medium
26	Shawaal Zulfiqar	27 May 2005 (aged 20)	Right handed	Right-arm off break
Wicket-keepers
17	Muneeba Ali (vc)	8 August 1997 (aged 28)	Left handed	—N/a
22	Sidra Nawaz	14 March 1994 (aged 31)	Right handed	—N/a
All-rounders
14	Fatima Sana (c)	8 November 2001 (aged 23)	Right handed	Right-arm medium
99	Natalia Pervaiz	25 December 1995 (aged 29)	Right handed	Right-arm medium
37	Aliya Riaz	24 September 1992 (aged 33)	Right handed	Right-arm medium
11	Omaima Sohail	11 July 1997 (aged 28)	Right handed	Right-arm off break
Spin Bowlers
45	Sadia Iqbal	5 August 1995 (aged 30)	Left handed	Slow left-arm orthodox
6	Nashra Sandhu	19 November 1997 (aged 27)	Right handed	Slow left-arm orthodox
2	Syeda Aroob Shah	31 December 2003 (aged 21)	Right handed	Right-arm leg break
15	Rameen Shamim	19 January 1996 (aged 29)	Left handed	Right-arm off break
Pace Bowlers
42	Diana Baig	15 October 1995 (aged 29)	Right handed	Right-arm medium

Gull Feroza, Najiha Alvi, Tuba Hassan, Umm-e-Hani and Waheeda Akhtar were named as reserves.

== South Africa ==
- Squad announcement date: 3 September 2025
- Source: Cricket South Africa
- Coach: (South Africa) Mandla Mashimbyi

S/N	Player	Date of birth (age)	Batting style	Bowling style
Batters
14	Laura Wolvaardt (c)	26 April 1999 (aged 26)	Right handed	—N/a
1	Tazmin Brits	8 January 1991 (aged 34)	Right handed	—N/a
Wicket-keepers
10	Sinalo Jafta	22 December 1994 (aged 30)	Right handed	—N/a
72	Karabo Meso	18 September 2007 (aged 18)	Right handed	—N/a
All-rounders
27	Anneke Bosch	17 August 1993 (aged 32)	Right handed	Right-arm medium, Right-arm off break
32	Nadine de Klerk	16 January 2000 (aged 25)	Right handed	Right-arm medium
77	Annerie Dercksen	26 April 2001 (aged 24)	Right handed	Right-arm medium
7	Marizanne Kapp	4 January 1990 (aged 35)	Right handed	Right-arm medium
96	Suné Luus	5 January 1996 (aged 29)	Right handed	Right-arm leg break, Right-arm off break
25	Chloe Tryon	25 January 1994 (aged 31)	Right handed	Slow left-arm orthodox
Spin Bowlers
28	Nonkululeko Mlaba	27 June 2000 (aged 25)	Right handed	Slow left-arm orthodox
4	Nondumiso Shangase	5 April 1996 (aged 29)	Right handed	Right-arm off break
Pace Bowlers
99	Ayabonga Khaka	18 July 1992 (aged 33)	Right handed	Right-arm medium
5	Masabata Klaas	3 February 1991 (aged 34)	Right handed	Right-arm medium
12	Tumi Sekhukhune	21 November 1998 (aged 26)	Left handed	Right-arm medium

Miané Smit was named as travelling reserve.

== Sri Lanka ==
- Squad announcement date: 10 September 2025
- Source: International Cricket Council
- Coach: (Sri Lanka) Rumesh Ratnayake

S/N	Player	Date of birth (age)	Batting style	Bowling style
Batters
27	Nilakshi de Silva	27 September 1989 (aged 36)	Right handed	Right-arm slow-medium
9	Imesha Dulani	20 January 2002 (aged 23)	Right handed	—N/a
62	Vishmi Gunaratne	22 August 2005 (aged 20)	Right handed	Right-arm medium-fast
72	Hasini Perera	27 June 1995 (aged 30)	Left handed	Right-arm medium-fast
88	Harshitha Samarawickrama	29 June 1998 (aged 27)	Right handed	Right-arm slow-medium
Wicket-keepers
17	Anushka Sanjeewani	24 January 1990 (aged 35)	Right handed	—N/a
All-rounders
58	Chamari Athapaththu (c)	9 February 1990 (aged 35)	Left handed	Right-arm off break
6	Kavisha Dilhari	24 January 2001 (aged 24)	Right handed	Right-arm off break, Right-arm leg break
2	Dewmi Vihanga	2 August 2005 (aged 20)	Right handed	Right-arm off break
44	Piumi Wathsala	9 November 1995 (aged 29)	Right handed	Right-arm medium-fast
Spin bowlers
91	Sugandika Kumari	5 October 1991 (aged 33)	Left handed	Slow left-arm orthodox
18	Inoka Ranaweera	18 February 1986 (aged 39)	Left handed	Slow left-arm orthodox
Pace bowlers
22	Achini Kulasuriya	7 June 1990 (aged 35)	Left handed	Right-arm medium-fast
15	Malki Madara	30 December 2000 (aged 24)	Right handed	Right-arm medium
55	Udeshika Prabodhani	20 September 1985 (aged 40)	Right handed	Left-arm medium

Inoshi Priyadharshani was named as travelling reserve.

== Statistics ==
=== ODI caps ===
Fewest caps (Note: The table only includes those who were in the 15 member squad at the start of the tournament. Caps include all appearances in ODIs before 30 September 2025, the first day of the World Cup.)		Most caps	
(Bangladesh) Rubya Haider	0	(New Zealand) Suzie Bates	171
(India) Uma Chetry	0	(Australia) Ellyse Perry	158
(Pakistan) Eyman Fatima	1	(South Africa) Marizanne Kapp	153
(England) Emily Arlott	3	(India) Harmanpreet Kaur	153
(England) Linsey Smith	4	(New Zealand) Sophie Devine	152
Source: ESPNcricinfo

=== Age ===
Youngest players (Note: The table only includes those who were in the 15 member squad at the start of the tournament. Age as of 30 September 2025, the first day of the World Cup.)		Oldest players	
(Bangladesh) Nishita Akter Nishi	17 years, 103 days	(Sri Lanka) Udeshika Prabodhani	40 years, 10 days
(Bangladesh) Shorna Akter	18 years, 272 days	(Sri Lanka) Inoka Ranaweera	39 years, 224 days
(South Africa) Karabo Meso	18 years, 12 days	(New Zealand) Suzie Bates	38 years, 14 days
(Bangladesh) Sumaiya Akter	19 years, 350 days	(India) Harmanpreet Kaur	36 years, 206 days
(Sri Lanka) Vishmi Gunaratne	20 years, 39 days	(New Zealand) Sophie Devine	36 years, 29 days
