= 2020 Women's T20 World Cup squads =

List of cricketers

The following squads were selected for the 2020 ICC Women's T20 World Cup tournament.

== Australia ==
On 16 January 2020, Cricket Australia (CA) announced its squad. Tayla Vlaeminck was ruled out of the tournament due to a stress injury of her right foot, with Molly Strano named as her replacement.

- Meg Lanning (c)
- Rachael Haynes (vc)
- Erin Burns
- Nicola Carey
- Ashleigh Gardner
- Alyssa Healy (wk)
- Jess Jonassen
- Delissa Kimmince
- Sophie Molineux
- Beth Mooney
- Ellyse Perry
- Megan Schutt
- Molly Strano
- Annabel Sutherland
- ~~Tayla Vlaeminck~~
- Georgia Wareham

== Bangladesh ==
On 29 January 2020, the Bangladesh Cricket Board (BCB) announced its squad.

- Salma Khatun (c)
- Rumana Ahmed (vc)
- Nahida Akter
- Jahanara Alam
- Panna Ghosh
- Fargana Hoque
- Sanjida Islam
- Fahima Khatun
- Murshida Khatun
- Khadija Tul Kubra
- Ritu Moni
- Sobhana Mostary
- Ayasha Rahman
- Nigar Sultana
- Shamima Sultana

== England ==
On 17 January 2020, the England and Wales Cricket Board (ECB) announced its squad.

- Heather Knight (c)
- Tammy Beaumont
- Katherine Brunt
- Kate Cross
- Freya Davies
- Sophie Ecclestone
- Georgia Elwiss
- Sarah Glenn
- Amy Jones (wk)
- Nat Sciver
- Anya Shrubsole
- Lauren Winfield
- Fran Wilson
- Danni Wyatt
- Mady Villiers

== India ==
On 12 January 2020, the Board of Control for Cricket in India (BCCI) announced its squad.

- Harmanpreet Kaur (c)
- Smriti Mandhana
- Taniya Bhatia (wk)
- Harleen Deol
- Rajeshwari Gayakwad
- Richa Ghosh
- Veda Krishnamurthy
- Shikha Pandey
- Arundhati Reddy
- Jemimah Rodrigues
- Deepti Sharma
- Pooja Vastrakar
- Shafali Verma
- Poonam Yadav
- Radha Yadav

== New Zealand ==
On 29 January 2020, New Zealand Cricket (NZC) announced its squad.

- Sophie Devine (c)
- Suzie Bates
- Lauren Down
- Maddy Green
- Holly Huddleston
- Hayley Jensen
- Leigh Kasperek
- Amelia Kerr
- Jess Kerr
- Rosemary Mair
- Katey Martin
- Katie Perkins
- Anna Peterson
- Rachel Priest
- Lea Tahuhu

== Pakistan ==
On 20 January 2020, the Pakistan Cricket Board (PCB) announced its squad. On 28 February 2020, in the match against England, captain Bismah Maroof broke her right thumb. She was ruled out of the rest of the tournament, with Nahida Khan named as her replacement and Javeria Khan captaining the side in her absence.

- Bismah Maroof (c)
- Javeria Khan (vc)
- Muneeba Ali
- Anam Amin
- Aiman Anwer
- Diana Baig
- Nida Dar
- Sadia Iqbal
- Iram Javed
- Nahida Khan
- Ayesha Naseem
- Sidra Nawaz (wk)
- Aliya Riaz
- Fatima Sana
- Syeda Aroob Shah
- Omaima Sohail

== South Africa ==
On 13 January 2020, Cricket South Africa (CSA) announced its squad.

- Dane van Niekerk (c)
- Chloe Tryon (vc)
- Trisha Chetty
- Shabnim Ismail
- Marizanne Kapp
- Ayabonga Khaka
- Masabata Klaas
- Nadine de Klerk
- Lizelle Lee
- Suné Luus
- Nonkululeko Mlaba
- Mignon du Preez
- Tumi Sekhukhune
- Nondumiso Shangase
- Laura Wolvaardt

== Sri Lanka ==
On 27 January 2020, Sri Lanka Cricket (SLC) announced its squad.

- Chamari Athapaththu (c)
- Harshitha Samarawickrama (vc)
- Kavisha Dilhari
- Ama Kanchana
- Hansima Karunaratne
- Achini Kulasuriya
- Sugandika Kumari
- Dilani Manodara
- Hasini Perera
- Udeshika Prabodhani
- Sathya Sandeepani
- Anushka Sanjeewani
- Nilakshi de Silva
- Shashikala Siriwardene
- Umesha Thimashini

== Thailand ==
On 29 January 2020, the Cricket Association of Thailand (CAT) announced its squad.

- Sornnarin Tippoch (c)
- Nattaya Boochatham (vc)
- Naruemol Chaiwai
- Natthakan Chantam
- Onnicha Kamchomphu
- Rosenanee Kanoh
- Suwanan Khiaoto
- Nannapat Koncharoenkai (wk)
- Suleeporn Laomi
- Soraya Lateh
- Wongpaka Liengprasert
- Phannita Maya
- Ratanaporn Padunglerd
- Thipatcha Putthawong
- Chanida Sutthiruang

== West Indies ==
On 22 January 2020, Cricket West Indies (CWI) announced its squad. Lee-Ann Kirby was named in the squad, after last representing the West Indies in July 2008. On 1 March 2020, in the match against England, captain Stafanie Taylor suffered a groin injury, and was taken off the field. Taylor was ruled out of their final group game, against South Africa, with vice-captain Anisa Mohammed replacing her.

- Stafanie Taylor (c)
- Anisa Mohammed (vc)
- Aaliyah Alleyne
- Shemaine Campbelle (wk)
- Shamilia Connell
- Britney Cooper
- Deandra Dottin
- Afy Fletcher
- Cherry-Ann Fraser
- Sheneta Grimmond
- Chinelle Henry
- Lee-Ann Kirby
- Hayley Matthews
- Chedean Nation
- Shakera Selman
