= India women's cricket team in Bangladesh in 2023 =

International cricket tour

	Bangladesh	India
- Dates: 9 – 22 July 2023
Captains	Nigar Sultana	Harmanpreet Kaur

One Day International series
- Results: 3-match series drawn 1–1
Most runs	Fargana Hoque (181)	Jemimah Rodrigues (129)
Most wickets	Marufa Akter (7)	Devika Vaidya (6)
- Player of the series: Fargana Hoque (Ban)

Twenty20 International series
- Results: India won the 3-match series 2–1
Most runs	Shamima Sultana (64)	Harmanpreet Kaur (94)
Most wickets	Sultana Khatun (7)	Minnu Mani (5)
- Player of the series: Harmanpreet Kaur (Ind)

The India women's cricket team toured Bangladesh in July 2023 to play three One Day International (ODI) and three Twenty20 International (T20I) matches. The ODI series formed part of the 2022–2025 ICC Women's Championship.

India won the T20I series 2–1. Bangladesh won the first match of the ODI series, which was their first win over India in the format. India defeated Bangladesh by 108 runs in the second ODI. The third and last ODI ended in a tie, leading to the series being drawn 1–1.

On 25 July 2023, Harmanpreet Kaur, the Indian captain, was fined 75% of her match fee, banned for two matches, and given four demerit points by the International Cricket Council (ICC) for breaching the code of conduct for her outbursts during the final ODI of the series. She pleaded guilty to two separate charges pressed by the match referee.

Kaur received three demerit points and fined 50% of her match fee for "showing dissent at an umpire's decision". Thus, she became the first women's player to be given a Level 2 sanction since the ICC began listing code of conduct breaches publicly in 2016. She also received one demerit point for a separate Level 1 penalty along with a fine of 25% of her match fee for "public criticism" of match officials. Kaur found herself in the controversy after hitting the stumps with her bat when she was given out. In the post-match presentation, she publicly criticised the umpires and disrespected the opponent team during the photo session, leading to the Bangladeshi players' walkout.

== Squads ==
Bangladesh		India	
ODIs	T20Is	ODIs	T20Is
Nigar Sultana (c, wk); Nahida Akter (vc); Sharmin Akhter; Marufa Akter; Shorna Akter; Disha Biswas; Fargana Hoque; Rabeya Khan; Fahima Khatun; Murshida Khatun; Salma Khatun; Sultana Khatun; Sanjida Akter Meghla; Lata Mondal; Ritu Moni; Sobhana Mostary; Shamima Sultana (wk)	Nigar Sultana (c, wk); Dilara Akter (wk); Marufa Akter; Nahida Akter; Shorna Akter; Disha Biswas; Rabeya Khan; Fahima Khatun; Murshida Khatun; Salma Khatun; Sultana Khatun; Sanjida Akter Meghla; Ritu Moni; Sobhana Mostary; Shathi Rani; Shamima Sultana (wk)	Harmanpreet Kaur (c); Smriti Mandhana (vc); Anusha Bareddy; Yastika Bhatia (wk); Uma Chetry (wk); Harleen Deol; Rashi Kanojiya; Amanjot Kaur; Monica Patel; Priya Punia; Sneh Rana; Jemimah Rodrigues; Anjali Sarvani; Deepti Sharma; Meghna Singh; Devika Vaidya; Pooja Vastrakar; Shafali Verma	Harmanpreet Kaur (c); Smriti Mandhana (vc); Anusha Bareddy; Yastika Bhatia (wk); Uma Chetry (wk); Harleen Deol; Rashi Kanojiya; Amanjot Kaur; Minnu Mani; Sabbhineni Meghana; Monica Patel; Jemimah Rodrigues; Anjali Sarvani; Deepti Sharma; Meghna Singh; Devika Vaidya; Pooja Vastrakar; Shafali Verma

Bangladesh named Sharmin Akhter, Fargana Hoque, Lata Mondal and Fariha Trisna as standby players in their T20I squad.

== T20I series ==
=== 1st T20I ===
9 July 2023
14:00
Scorecard

Bangladesh; 114/5 (20 overs)	v	India; 118/3 (16.2 overs)
Shorna Akter 28* (28); Pooja Vastrakar 1/16 (4 overs)		Harmanpreet Kaur 54* (35); Sultana Khatun 2/25 (4 overs)

India won by 7 wickets
Sher-e-Bangla National Cricket Stadium, Dhaka
Umpires: Ali Arman (Ban) and Mahfuzur Rahman (Ban)
Player of the match: Harmanpreet Kaur (Ind)

- India won the toss and elected to field.
- Shathi Rani (Ban), Anusha Bareddy and Minnu Mani (Ind) all made their T20I debuts.

=== 2nd T20I ===
11 July 2023
14:00
Scorecard

India; 95/8 (20 overs)	v	Bangladesh; 87 (20 overs)
Shafali Verma 19 (14); Sultana Khatun 3/21 (4 overs)		Nigar Sultana 38 (55); Deepti Sharma 3/12 (4 overs)

India won by 8 runs
Sher-e-Bangla National Cricket Stadium, Dhaka
Umpires: Mahfuzur Rahman (Ban) and Moniruzzaman (Ban)
Player of the match: Deepti Sharma (Ind)

- India won the toss and elected to bat.
- Murshida Khatun replaced Sobhana Mostary as a concussion substitute for Bangladesh during second innings.

=== 3rd T20I ===
13 July 2023
14:00
Scorecard

India; 102/9 (20 overs)	v	Bangladesh; 103/6 (18.2 overs)
Harmanpreet Kaur 40 (41); Rabeya Khan 3/16 (4 overs)		Shamima Sultana 42 (46); Devika Vaidya 2/16 (4 overs)

Bangladesh won by 4 wickets
Sher-e-Bangla National Cricket Stadium, Dhaka
Umpires: Ali Arman (Ban) and Mahfuzur Rahman (Ban)
Player of the match: Shamima Sultana (Ban)

- India won the toss and elected to bat.
- Rashi Kanojiya (Ind) made her T20I debut.

== ODI series ==
=== 1st ODI ===
16 July 2023
09:30
Scorecard

Bangladesh; 152 (43 overs)	v	India; 113 (35.5 overs)
Nigar Sultana 39 (64); Amanjot Kaur 4/31 (9 overs)		Deepti Sharma 20 (40); Marufa Akter 4/29 (7 overs)

Bangladesh won by 40 runs (DLS method)
Sher-e-Bangla National Cricket Stadium, Dhaka
Umpires: Mahfuzur Rahman (Ban) and Moniruzzaman (Ban)
Player of the match: Marufa Akter (Ban)

- India won the toss and elected to field.
- The match was reduced to 44 overs per side due to rain. India were set a revised target of 154 runs from 44 overs.
- Shorna Akter (Ban), Anusha Bareddy and Amanjot Kaur (Ind) all made their ODI debuts.
- This was Bangladesh's first win against India in ODIs.
- Women's Championship points: Bangladesh 2, India 0.

=== 2nd ODI ===
19 July 2023
09:30
Scorecard

India; 228/8 (50 overs)	v	Bangladesh; 120 (35.1 overs)
Jemimah Rodrigues 86 (78); Nahida Akter 2/37 (10 overs)		Fargana Hoque 47 (81); Jemimah Rodrigues 4/3 (3.1 overs)

India won by 108 runs
Sher-e-Bangla National Cricket Stadium, Dhaka
Umpires: Tanvir Ahmed (Ban) and Ali Arman (Ban)
Player of the match: Jemimah Rodrigues (Ind)

- Bangladesh won the toss and elected to field.
- Women's Championship points: India 2, Bangladesh 0.

=== 3rd ODI ===
22 July 2023
09:30
Scorecard

Bangladesh; 225/4 (50 overs)	v	India; 225 (49.3 overs)
Fargana Hoque 107 (160); Sneh Rana 2/45 (10 overs)		Harleen Deol 77 (108); Nahida Akter 3/37 (10 overs)

Match tied
Sher-e-Bangla National Cricket Stadium, Dhaka
Umpires: Tanvir Ahmed (Ban) and Muhammad Kamruzzaman (Ban)
Player of the match: Harleen Deol (Ind)

- Bangladesh won the toss and elected to bat.
- Fargana Hoque became the first cricketer for Bangladesh to score a century in women's ODIs.
- A Super Over would have been played had there been time available.
- Women's Championship points: Bangladesh 1, India 1.
