= Sri Lanka women's cricket team in New Zealand in 2015–16 =

International cricket tour

Sri lankan women's tour of New Zealand
	New Zealand women	Sri Lanka women
- Dates: 3 November – 22 November
Captains	Suzie Bates	Shashikala Siriwardene

One Day International series
- Results: New Zealand women won the 5-match series 5–0
Most runs	Rachel Priest (316)	Chamari Atapattu (155)
Most wickets	Erin Bermingham (10)	Inoka Ranaweera (5)

Twenty20 International series
- Results: New Zealand women won the 3-match series 3–0
Most runs	Suzie Bates (105)	Chamari Atapattu (60)
Most wickets	Leigh Kasperek (5)	Ama Kanchana (3)
- Player of the series: Suzie Bates

The Sri Lankan women's cricket team toured New Zealand in November 2015. The tour included a series of 5 One Day Internationals (ODIs) and 3 Twenty20 International matches. The first 3 of the 5 ODI matches were also part of the 2014–2016 ICC Women's Championship. The Sri Lanka team was announced on 8 October 2015 and the captaincy was given back to all-rounder Shashikala Siriwardene. However, during the third ODI, Siriwardene suffered a thumb fracture injury which forced her to retire from the tour. The captaincy for the remaining matches was given back to the previous captain Chamari Atapattu.

== Squads ==
ODIs		T20Is	
New Zealand	Sri Lanka	New Zealand	Sri Lanka
Suzie Bates (c); Erin Bermingham; Sophie Devine (vc); Leigh Kasperek; Sara McGlashan (wk); Morna Nielsen; Katie Perkins; Liz Perry; Anna Peterson; Rachel Priest (wk); Hannah Rowe; Amy Satterthwaite; Lea Tahuhu	Shashikala Siriwardene (c); Dilani Manodara; Chamari Atapattu (vc); Prasadini Weerakkody (wk); Ama Kanchana; Inoka Ranaweera; Nipuni Hansika; Maduri Samuddika; Udeshika Prabodhani; Sripali Weerakkody; Hasini Perera; Anushka Sanjeewani; Nilakshi de Silva; Chamari Polgampola; Sugandhika Dassanayake; Stand-by Players: Achini Kulasuriya; Oshadi Ranasinghe; Lasanthi Madhushani	Suzie Bates (c); Erin Bermingham; Sophie Devine (vc); Leigh Kasperek; Sara McGlashan (wk); Thamsyn Newton; Morna Nielsen; Katie Perkins; Liz Perry; Anna Peterson; Rachel Priest (wk); Hannah Rowe; Amy Satterthwaite; Lea Tahuhu	Shashikala Siriwardene (c); Dilani Manodara; Chamari Atapattu (vc); Prasadini Weerakkody (wk); Ama Kanchana; Inoka Ranaweera; Nipuni Hansika; Maduri Samuddika; Udeshika Prabodhani; Sripali Weerakkody; Hasini Perera; Anushka Sanjeewani; Nilakshi de Silva; Chamari Polgampola; Sugandhika Dassanayake; Stand-by Players: Achini Kulasuriya; Oshadi Ranasinghe; Lasanthi Madhushani

== Tour match ==
31 October
10:30
Scorecard

Sri Lanka; 204/9 (50 overs)	v	New Zealand A 205/4 (44.3 overs)
Dilani Manodara 41 (57); Frances Mackay 3/30 (10 overs)		Samantha Curtis 93* (122); Sripali Weerakkody 1/25 (7 overs)

New Zealand A Women won by 6 wickets
Bert Sutcliffe Oval, Lincoln
Umpires: Kim Cotton (NZ) and Eugene Sanders (NZ)

- Sri Lanka Women won the toss and elected to bat.

== ODI series ==
=== 1st ODI ===
ICC Women's Championship
3 November
10:30
Scorecard

New Zealand; 283/9 (50 overs)	v	Sri Lanka; 187/9 (50 overs)
Rachel Priest 108 (116); Inoka Ranaweera 4/53 (8 overs)		Chamari Atapattu 75 (105); Leigh Kasperek 4/27 (10 overs)

New Zealand Women won by 96 runs
Bert Sutcliffe Oval, Lincoln
Umpires: Kathy Cross (NZ) and Phil Jones (NZ)
Player of the match: Rachel Priest (NZ Women)

- Sri Lanka Women won the toss and elected to field.
- Nilakshi de Silva (SL) made her ODI debut. Inoka Ranaweera (SL) took a hat-trick.
- ICC Women's Championship points: New Zealand Women 2, Sri Lanka Women 0

=== 2nd ODI ===
ICC Women's Championship
5 November
10:30
Scorecard

Sri Lanka; 126 (46.5 overs)	v	New Zealand; 130/0 (14.3 overs)
Chamari Polgampola 35 (80); Suzie Bates 3/27 (10 overs)		Suzie Bates 70* (44); Chamari Polgampola 0/8 (0.3 overs)

New Zealand Women won by 10 wickets
Bert Sutcliffe Oval, Lincoln
Umpires: Kathy Cross (NZ) and Wayne Knights (NZ)
Player of the match: Suzie Bates (NZ Women)

- New Zealand Women won the toss and elected to field.
- ICC Women's Championship points: New Zealand Women 2, Sri Lanka Women 0

=== 3rd ODI ===
ICC Women's Championship
7 November
10:30
Scorecard

New Zealand; 326/5 (50 overs)	v	Sri Lanka; 138 (41.5 overs)
Rachel Priest 157 (146); Ama Kanchana 2/54 (9 overs)		Ama Kanchana 28* (58); Erin Bermingham 3/26 (7.5 overs)

New Zealand Women won by 188 runs
Bert Sutcliffe Oval, Lincoln
Umpires: Kathy Cross (NZ) and Derek Walker (NZ)
Player of the match: Rachel Priest (NZ Women)

- New Zealand Women won the toss and elected to bat.
- ICC Women's Championship points: New Zealand Women 2, Sri Lanka Women 0

=== 4th ODI ===
10 November
10:30
Scorecard

Sri Lanka; 126 (46.2 overs)	v	New Zealand; 127/0 (18.3 overs)
Chamari Atapattu 56 (89); Morna Nielsen 5/21 (10 overs)		Suzie Bates 70* (51); Ama Kanchana 0/13 (2 overs)

New Zealand Women won by 10 wickets
Bert Sutcliffe Oval, Lincoln
Umpires: Ashley Mehrotra (Ind) and Derek Walker (NZ)
Player of the match: Morna Nielsen (NZ Women)

- Sri Lanka Women won the toss elected to bat.
- Achini Kulasuriya made her Women ODI debut.

=== 5th ODI ===
13 November
10:30
Scorecard

Sri Lanka; 99 (47.5 overs)	v	New Zealand; 102/2 (17.3 overs)
Prasadini Weerakkody 27 (55); Erin Bermingham 4/16 (8.5 overs)		Sara McGlashan 39 (34); Ama Kanchana 1/26 (4 overs)

New Zealand Women won by 8 wickets
Hagley Oval, Christchurch
Umpires: Chris Brown (NZ) and Barry Frost (NZ)
Player of the match: Erin Bermingham (NZ Women)

- Sri Lanka Women won the toss and elected to bat.

== T20I series ==
=== 1st T20I ===
15 November
14:00
Scorecard

New Zealand; 188/3 (20 overs)	v	Sri Lanka; 86/6 (20 overs)
Sophie Devine 54 (35); Sugandika Kumari 1/25 (4 overs)		Oshadi Ranasinghe 34* (41); Lea Tahuhu 2/10 (4 overs)

New Zealand Women won by 102 runs
Hagley Oval, Christchurch
Umpires: Wayne Knights (NZ) and Tim Parlane (NZ)
Player of the match: Sophie Devine (NZWomen)

- New Zealand Women won the toss and elected to bat.
- Thamsyn Newton (NZ) made her T20I debut.

=== 2nd T20I ===
20 November
16:00
Scorecard

New Zealand; 114/7 (20 overs)	v	Sri Lanka; 103/8 (20 overs)
Suzie Bates 69 (58); Ama Kanchana 3/22 (4 overs)		Chamari Atapattu 47 (55); Leigh Kasperek 3/7 (4 overs)

New Zealand Women won by 11 runs
Saxton Oval, Nelson
Umpires: Kathy Cross (NZ) and Phil Jones (NZ)
Player of the match: Suzie Bates (NZWomen)

- New Zealand Women won the toss and elected to bat.

=== 3rd T20I ===
22 November
14:00
Scorecard

Sri Lanka; 86/9 (20 overs)	v	New Zealand; 90/1 (9.2 overs)
Dilani Manodara 23 (19); Thamsyn Newton 3/9 (4 overs)		Rachel Priest 37* (23); Chamari Atapattu 1/19 (2 overs)

New Zealand Women won by 9 wickets
Saxton Oval, Nelson
Umpires: Kathy Cross (NZ) and Tony Gillies (NZ)
Player of the match: Thamsyn Newton (NZ)

- New Zealand Women won the toss and elected to field.
- Achini Kulasuriya (SL) made her T20I debut.
