= Bangladesh women's cricket team in New Zealand in 2022–23 =

	New Zealand	Bangladesh
- Dates: 2 December 2022 – 17 December 2022
Captains	Sophie Devine	Nigar Sultana

One Day International series
- Results: New Zealand won the 3-match series 1–0
Most runs	Suzie Bates (153)	Nigar Sultana (92)
Most wickets	Jess Kerr (5)	Jahanara Alam (2)
- Player of the series: Suzie Bates (NZ)

Twenty20 International series
- Results: New Zealand won the 3-match series 3–0
Most runs	Amelia Kerr (121)	Nigar Sultana (35)
Most wickets	Lea Tahuhu (8)	Marufa Akter (3)
- Player of the series: Lea Tahuhu (NZ)

The Bangladesh women's cricket team toured New Zealand in December 2022 to play three One Day International (ODI) and three Twenty20 International (T20I) matches. The ODI matches formed part of the 2022–2025 ICC Women's Championship.

Batting first, New Zealand scored 164/3 in the first T20I and then bowled Bangladesh out for 32 runs, winning the match by 132 runs – their biggest win in the format. New Zealand also won the second T20I, thanks to a record 77-run partnership between Amelia Kerr and Maddy Green. Amelia Kerr starred once again in the third T20I to help New Zealand complete a 3–0 sweep of Bangladesh.

Bangladesh lost the opening ODI after getting bowled out for 180, despite a career-best innings of 73 runs by Nigar Sultana. Jess Kerr's four-wicket haul led New Zealand to an eight-wicket victory in the match. The second ODI was washed out after multiple rain breaks before and during the match. New Zealand won the ODI series 1–0 after the third ODI was also washed out, this time after only 26.5 overs of play. The final ODI was the seventh international cricket fixture hosted in New Zealand to get washed out in 2022 – a record number for New Zealand in a calendar year.

== Squads ==
New Zealand		Bangladesh
ODIs	T20Is	ODIs and T20Is
Sophie Devine (c); Suzie Bates; Eden Carson; Lauren Down; Maddy Green (wk); ~~Brooke Halliday~~; Hayley Jensen; Fran Jonas; Amelia Kerr; Jess Kerr; Jess McFadyen (wk); Molly Penfold; Georgia Plimmer; Hannah Rowe	Sophie Devine (c); Suzie Bates; Rebecca Burns; Eden Carson; Lauren Down; Maddy Green (wk); ~~Brooke Halliday~~; Hayley Jensen; Fran Jonas; Amelia Kerr; Jess Kerr; Jess McFadyen (wk); Georgia Plimmer; Lea Tahuhu	Nigar Sultana (c, wk); Rumana Ahmed; Sharmin Akhter; Dilara Akter (wk); Marufa Akter; Nahida Akter; Jahanara Alam; Disha Biswas; Fargana Hoque; Rabeya Khan; Fahima Khatun; Murshida Khatun; Salma Khatun; Sanjida Akter Meghla; Lata Mondal; Ritu Moni; Fariha Trisna

Brooke Halliday was ruled out of New Zealand's squad for the entire series due to a hand injury; Rebecca Burns was named as a replacement in the T20I squad, while Georgia Plimmer was added to the ODI squad.

== Warm-up matches ==
Before the start of the series, Bangladesh faced a New Zealand XI in a 50-over and a 20-over warm-up match.

28 November 2022
11:00
Scorecard

Bangladesh; 203 (50 overs)	v	New Zealand XI; 228/5 (50 overs)
Ritu Moni 46 (80); Molly Penfold 5/36 (10 overs)		Kate Ebrahim 72* (109); Ritu Moni 2/26 (6 overs)

New Zealand XI won by 7 wickets
Bert Sutcliffe Oval, Lincoln
Umpires: Kim Cotton (NZ) and Tina Semmens (NZ)

- Toss uncontested.
- New Zealand XI batted the allocated 50 overs for practice despite reaching the target of 204 runs in 46.2 overs with 3 wickets lost.

30 November 2022
11:00
Scorecard

New Zealand XI; 124/5 (20 overs)	v	Bangladesh; 125/3 (18 overs)
Saachi Shahri 34* (34); Sanjida Akter Meghla 2/15 (3 overs)		Murshida Khatun 38 (42); Molly Penfold 1/13 (4 overs)

Bangladesh won by 7 wickets
Bert Sutcliffe Oval, Lincoln
Umpires: Kim Cotton (NZ) and Tina Semmens (NZ)

- New Zealand XI won the toss and elected to bat.

== T20I series ==
=== 1st T20I ===
2 December 2022
19:00 (D/N)
Scorecard

New Zealand; 164/3 (20 overs)	v	Bangladesh; 32 (14.5 overs)
Sophie Devine 45 (34); Nahida Akter 1/25 (3 overs)		Ritu Moni 6 (17); Lea Tahuhu 4/6 (4 overs)

New Zealand won by 132 runs
Hagley Oval, Christchurch
Umpires: Cory Black (NZ) and John Dempsey (NZ)
Player of the match: Lea Tahuhu (NZ)

- New Zealand won the toss and elected to bat.
- Jess McFadyen (NZ) and Dilara Akter (Ban) both made their T20I debuts.

=== 2nd T20I ===
4 December 2022
14:00
Scorecard

New Zealand; 148/4 (20 overs)	v	Bangladesh; 111/8 (20 overs)
Amelia Kerr 46* (30); Marufa Akter 2/22 (4 overs)		Nigar Sultana 31 (33); Hayley Jensen 2/12 (3 overs)

New Zealand won by 37 runs
University Oval, Dunedin
Umpires: Kim Cotton (NZ) and John Dempsey (NZ)
Player of the match: Amelia Kerr (NZ)

- New Zealand won the toss and elected to bat.
- Rebecca Burns (NZ) and Marufa Akter (Ban) both made her T20I debuts.

=== 3rd T20I ===
7 December 2022
14:00
Scorecard

New Zealand; 152/7 (20 overs)	v	Bangladesh; 89/7 (20 overs)
Amelia Kerr 48* (31); Fariha Trisna 1/19 (4 overs)		Rumana Ahmed 25 (24); Lea Tahuhu 3/13 (4 overs)

New Zealand won by 63 runs
John Davies Oval, Queenstown
Umpires: Cory Black (NZ) and Kim Cotton (NZ)
Player of the match: Amelia Kerr (NZ)

- New Zealand won the toss and elected to bat.

== ODI series ==
=== 1st ODI ===
11 December 2022
11:00
Scorecard

Bangladesh; 180/8 (50 overs)	v	New Zealand; 181/2 (31 overs)
Nigar Sultana 73 (133); Jess Kerr 4/23 (10 overs)		Suzie Bates 93* (91); Jahanara Alam 2/32 (8 overs)

New Zealand won by 8 wickets
Basin Reserve, Wellington
Umpires: Cory Black (NZ) and John Dempsey (NZ)
Player of the match: Jess Kerr (NZ)

- Bangladesh won the toss and elected to bat.
- Jess McFadyen (NZ), Marufa Akter and Rabeya Khan (Ban) all made their ODI debuts.
- Women's Championship points: New Zealand 2, Bangladesh 0.

=== 2nd ODI ===
14 December 2022
14:00 (D/N)
Scorecard

Bangladesh; 157/7 (44 overs)	v	New Zealand; 14/1 (4.4 overs)
Ritu Moni 32 (58); Fran Jonas 2/30 (9 overs)		Suzie Bates 9* (22)

No result
McLean Park, Napier
Umpires: Kim Cotton (NZ) and John Dempsey (NZ)

- Bangladesh won the toss and elected to bat.
- No further play was possible due to rain.
- Dilara Akter (Ban) made her ODI debut.
- Women's Championship points: New Zealand 1, Bangladesh 1.

=== 3rd ODI ===
17 December 2022
14:00 (D/N)
Scorecard

New Zealand; 123/2 (26.5 overs)	v	Bangladesh
Suzie Bates 51 (80); Ritu Moni 1/21 (5 overs)

No result
Seddon Park, Hamilton
Umpires: Cory Black (NZ) and Kim Cotton (NZ)

- Bangladesh won the toss and elected to field.
- No further play was possible due to rain.
- Women's Championship points: New Zealand 1, Bangladesh 1.
