= Cricket at the 2022 Asian Games =

- Venues: ZJUT Cricket Field
- Dates: 19 September – 7 October 2023
- Competitors: 332 from 15 nations

Cricket was one of the 37 sports that was played at the 2022 Asian Games in Hangzhou, China. Both men's and women's Twenty20 International tournaments were played from 19 September to 7 October 2023. Prior to this edition, cricket was last played at the Asian Games in 2014. The Asian Games were originally planned to take place in September 2022, but were later postponed by one year because of the COVID-19 pandemic. Fourteen men's teams and nine women's teams took part. The teams were seeded based on the ICC T20I Rankings as of 1 June 2023. India won both the Men's and Women's events by defeating Afghanistan and Sri Lanka respectively, in the finals.

== Schedule ==
P	Preliminary round	¼	Quarterfinals	½	Semifinals	F	Finals

Event↓/Date →	19th Tue	20th Wed	21st Thu	22nd Fri	23rd Sat	24th Sun	25th Mon	26th Tue	27th Wed	28th Thu	29th Fri	30th Sat	1st Sun	2nd Mon	3rd Tue	4th Wed	5th Thu	6th Fri	7 Sat
Men									P	P	P		P	P	¼	¼		½	F
Women	P	P	¼	¼		½	F												

== Medalists ==
Event	Gold	Silver	Bronze
Men	India; Arshdeep Singh; Washington Sundar; Jitesh Sharma; Shivam Dube; Ruturaj Gaikwad; Rinku Singh; Shahbaz Ahmed; Mukesh Kumar; Rahul Tripathi; Ravi Bishnoi; Sai Kishore; Yashasvi Jaiswal; Avesh Khan; Tilak Varma; Prabhsimran Singh	Afghanistan; Nijat Masood; Karim Janat; Gulbadin Naib; Noor Ali Zadran; Sharafuddin Ashraf; Shahidullah; Sediqullah Atal; Qais Ahmad; Afsar Zazai; Sayed Shirzad; Fareed Ahmad; Zubaid Akbari; Wafiullah Tarakhil; Zahir Khan; Mohammad Shahzad	Bangladesh; Mrittunjoy Chowdhury; Sumon Khan; Nahid Rana; Parvez Hossain Emon; Ripon Mondol; Zakir Hasan; Saif Hassan; Jaker Ali; Afif Hossain; Yasir Ali; Rishad Hossain; Mahmudul Hasan Joy; Shahadat Hossain; Hasan Murad; Rakibul Hasan
Women	India; Rajeshwari Gayakwad; Jemimah Rodrigues; Deepti Sharma; Harmanpreet Kaur; Richa Ghosh; Titas Sadhu; Shafali Verma; Smriti Mandhana; Amanjot Kaur; Pooja Vastrakar; Uma Chetry; Minnu Mani; Kanika Ahuja; Anusha Bareddy; Devika Vaidya	Sri Lanka; Kavisha Dilhari; Imesha Dulani; Anushka Sanjeewani; Inoka Ranaweera; Achini Kulasuriya; Nilakshi de Silva; Kaushini Nuthyangana; Inoshi Priyadharshani; Udeshika Prabodhani; Chamari Athapaththu; Vishmi Gunaratne; Hasini Perera; Oshadi Ranasinghe; Harshitha Samarawickrama; Sugandika Kumari	Bangladesh; Nigar Sultana; Rabeya Khan; Sobhana Mostary; Fahima Khatun; Shorna Akter; Lata Mondal; Disha Biswas; Sultana Khatun; Nahida Akter; Shathi Rani; Sanjida Akter Meghla; Shamima Sultana; Ritu Moni; Marufa Akter; Fargana Hoque

== Medal table ==
Rank	Nation	Gold	Silver	Bronze	Total
1	India (IND)	2	0	0	2
2	Afghanistan (AFG)	0	1	0	1
2	Sri Lanka (SRI)	0	1	0	1
4	Bangladesh (BAN)	0	0	2	2
Totals (4 entries)		2	2	2	6

== Draw ==
The teams were seeded based on the ICC T20I Rankings as of 1 June 2023.

=== Men ===
Originally, 15 teams registered for the men's tournament with the top 4 seeds directly advancing to the quarterfinals, but Bahrain's withdrawal changed the format. The fifth seed Afghanistan also joined the top 4 in the quarterfinal while the remaining 9 teams entered the preliminary round.

Rank	Seed	Team	Round
1	1	India	Quarterfinals – Seeded
4	2	Pakistan	Quarterfinals – Seeded
8	3	Sri Lanka	Quarterfinals – Seeded
9	4	Bangladesh	Quarterfinals – Seeded
10	5	Afghanistan	Quarterfinals – Unseeded
17	6	Nepal	Preliminary round
18	7	Hong Kong	Preliminary round
25	8	Malaysia	Preliminary round
~~29~~	—	~~Bahrain~~	Preliminary round
36	9	Singapore	Preliminary round
60	10	Japan	Preliminary round
78	11	Maldives	Preliminary round
—	—	Mongolia	Preliminary round
—	—	Cambodia	Preliminary round
—	—	Thailand	Preliminary round

Preliminary round – Group A

- Nepal (6)
- Maldives (11)
- Mongolia

Preliminary round – Group B

- Hong Kong (7)
- Japan (10)
- Cambodia

Preliminary round – Group C

- Malaysia (8)
- Singapore (9)
- Thailand

Quarterfinals

- India (1) vs. TBD
- Bangladesh (4) vs. TBD
- Pakistan (2) vs. TBD
- Sri Lanka (3) vs. TBD

=== Women ===
The five seeded teams (the top five teams in the ICC T20 rank) directly entered the quarterfinal while the remaining 4 teams competed in round 1.

Rank	Seed	Team	Round
4	1	India	Quarterfinals – Seeded
7	2	Pakistan	Quarterfinals – Seeded
8	3	Sri Lanka	Quarterfinals – Seeded
9	4	Bangladesh	Quarterfinals – Seeded
11	5	Thailand	Quarterfinals – Unseeded
21	6	Indonesia	Preliminary round
22	7	Hong Kong	Preliminary round
27	8	Malaysia	Preliminary round
—	—	Mongolia	Preliminary round

Preliminary round – Group A

- Indonesia (6)
- Mongolia

Preliminary round – Group B

- Hong Kong (7)
- Malaysia (8)

Quarterfinals

- India (1) vs. TBD
- Bangladesh (4) vs. TBD
- Pakistan (2) vs. TBD
- Sri Lanka (3) vs. TBD

== Final standing ==
=== Men ===
Rank	Team	Pld	W	L	T	NR
1st place, gold medalist(s)	India	3	2	0	0	1
2nd place, silver medalist(s)	Afghanistan	3	2	0	0	1
3rd place, bronze medalist(s)	Bangladesh	3	2	1	0	0
4	Pakistan	3	1	2	0	0
5	Hong Kong	3	2	1	0	0
5	Malaysia	3	2	1	0	0
5	Nepal	3	2	1	0	0
5	Sri Lanka	1	0	1	0	0
9	Japan	2	1	1	0	0
9	Maldives	2	1	1	0	0
9	Singapore	2	1	1	0	0
12	Cambodia	2	0	2	0	0
12	Mongolia	2	0	2	0	0
12	Thailand	2	0	2	0	0

=== Women ===
Rank	Team	Pld	W	L	T	NR
1st place, gold medalist(s)	India	3	2	0	0	1
2nd place, silver medalist(s)	Sri Lanka	3	2	1	0	0
3rd place, bronze medalist(s)	Bangladesh	3	1	1	0	1
4	Pakistan	3	0	2	0	1
5	Hong Kong	3	1	1	0	1
5	Indonesia	2	1	0	0	1
5	Malaysia	2	1	0	0	1
5	Thailand	1	0	1	0	0
9	Mongolia	2	0	2	0	0
