= Anusha Bareddy =

Indian cricketer (born 2003)

Personal information
- Full name: Anusha Bareddy
- Born: 6 June 2003 (age 23); Anantapur, Andhra Pradesh, India
- Batting: Left-handed
- Bowling: Slow left-arm orthodox
- Role: Bowler

International information
- National side: India
- Only ODI (cap 138): 16 July 2023 v Bangladesh
- T20I debut (cap 74): 9 July 2023 v Bangladesh
- Last T20I: 11 July 2023 v Bangladesh

Domestic team information
- Years: Team
- 2020/21–present: Andhra

Career statistics
Competition	WODI	WT20I	WLA	WT20
Matches	1	2	23	20
Runs scored	2	–	125	21
Batting average	2.00	–	15.62	21.00
100s/50s	0/0	–	0/0	0/0
Top score	2	–	31	13*
Balls bowled	6	48	1,097	420
Wickets	0	1	32	14
Bowling average	–	44.00	19.81	25.07
5 wickets in innings	0	0	1	0
10 wickets in match	0	0	0	0
Best bowling	–	1/20	5/10	2/5
Catches/stumpings	0/–	0/–	6/–	4/–
Medal record
Representing India
Women's Cricket
Asian Games
Gold medal – first place	2022 Hangzhou	Team
- Source: CricketArchive, 30 October 2023

Anusha Bareddy (born 6 June 2003) is an Indian cricketer who currently plays for Andhra. She plays as a slow left-arm orthodox bowler.

She made her international debut in July 2023, in a Twenty20 International for India against Bangladesh.

== Early life ==
Anusha was born on 6 June 2003 in Anantapur, Andhra Pradesh.

== Domestic career ==
Anusha made her debut for Andhra in the 2020–21 Women's Senior One Day Trophy against Uttar Pradesh, taking 1/17 from her 10 overs. In the 2022–23 Women's Senior One Day Trophy, she took her maiden List A five-wicket haul, with 5/10 from 8.1 overs against Tripura.

== International career ==
In June 2023, Anusha played for India A at the 2023 ACC Women's T20 Emerging Teams Asia Cup.

In July 2023, Anusha was named in her first India squad, for the side's upcoming series against Bangladesh. She made her debut in the first Twenty20 International of the series, bowling four overs for 24 runs. She took her maiden T20I wicket in the second match of the series. She made her One Day International debut in the first ODI of the same series, bowling one over. In September 2023, she was in India's squad for the Asian Games, but did not play a match.
