= Cricket at the 2022 Asian Games – Women's tournament =

International cricket tournament

Women at the 2022 Asian Games
- Venue: ZJUT Cricket Field
- Date: 19–25 September 2023
- Competitors: 131 from 9 nations

Medalists
gold medal	India
silver medal	Sri Lanka
bronze medal	Bangladesh

A women's cricket event was held as part of the 2022 Asian Games in Hangzhou, China from 19 to 25 September 2023. Nine teams took part in the event, and the participating teams were seeded according to their T20I rankings as of 1 June 2023.

India won the gold medal in the event by defeating Sri Lanka, who won the silver medal in the final. Bangladesh defeated Pakistan by 5 wickets in the bronze medal match.

Three of the quarter-finals had to be abandoned due to rain and the teams from those matches qualified for the semi-finals based on seeding.

== Squads ==
Bangladesh	Hong Kong	India	Indonesia
Nigar Sultana; Rabeya Khan; Sobhana Mostary; Fahima Khatun; Shorna Akter; Lata Mondal; Disha Biswas; Sultana Khatun; Nahida Akter; Shathi Rani; Sanjida Akter Meghla; Shamima Sultana; Ritu Moni; Marufa Akter; Fargana Hoque	To Yee Shan; Cindy Ho; Bella Poon; Heiley Hei; Kary Chan; Betty Chan; Maryam Bibi; Cheung Hiu Ying; Dorothea Chan; Charlotte Chan; Emma Lai; Akasha Yousaf; Amanda Cheung; Alison Siu; Natasha Miles	Rajeshwari Gayakwad; Jemimah Rodrigues; Deepti Sharma; Harmanpreet Kaur; Richa Ghosh; Titas Sadhu; Shafali Verma; Smriti Mandhana; Amanjot Kaur; Pooja Vastrakar; Uma Chetry; Minnu Mani; Kanika Ahuja; Anusha Bareddy; Devika Vaidya	Ni Made Putri Suwandewi; Kadek Winda Prastini; Sang Ayu Nyoman Maypriani; Ni Kadek Fitria Rada Rani; Ni Putu Ayu Nanda Sakarini; Ni Luh Ketut Wesika Ratna Dewi; Ni Wayan Sariani; Ni Kadek Ariani; Lie Qiao; Rahmawati Dwi Pangestuti; Mia Arda Leta; Andriani; Kisi Salisa Kasse; Maria Corazon; Desi Wulandari
Malaysia	Mongolia	Pakistan	Sri Lanka
Winifred Duraisingam; Jamahidaya Intan; Aina Najwa; Ainur Amelina; Wan Nor Zulaika; Nik Nur Atiela; Wan Julia; Aisya Eleesa; Ainna Hamizah Hashim; Nur Arianna Natsya; Dhanusri Muhunan; Nur Dania Syuhada; Mahirah Izzati Ismail; Mas Elysa; Musfirah Nur Ainaa	Bat-Amgalangiin Bulganchimeg; Battsetsegiin Namuunzul; Uuganbayaryn Anujin; Mendbayaryn Enkhzul; Battsogtyn Narangerel; Batjargalyn Ichinkhorloo; Ganboldyn Ürjindulam; Ganbatyn Namuunsüren; Jargalsaikhany Erdenesuvd; Gansükhiin Anujin; Tsendsürengiin Ariuntsetseg; Enkhboldyn Khaliunaa	Nashra Sandhu; Nida Dar; Omaima Sohail; Umm-e-Hani; Muneeba Ali; Sadaf Shamas; Najiha Alvi; Shawaal Zulfiqar; Sidra Ameen; Syeda Aroob Shah; Aliya Riaz; Diana Baig; Sadia Iqbal; Anosha Nasir; Natalia Pervaiz	Kavisha Dilhari; Imesha Dulani; Anushka Sanjeewani; Inoka Ranaweera; Achini Kulasuriya; Nilakshi de Silva; Kaushini Nuthyangana; Inoshi Priyadharshani; Udeshika Prabodhani; Chamari Athapaththu; Vishmi Gunaratne; Hasini Perera; Oshadi Ranasinghe; Harshitha Samarawickrama; Sugandika Kumari
Thailand			
Sornnarin Tippoch; Kanyakorn Bunthansen; Nattaya Boochatham; Onnicha Kamchomphu; Phannita Maya; Chanida Sutthiruang; Nannapat Koncharoenkai; Rosenanee Kanoh; Thipatcha Putthawong; Natthakan Chantham; Suwanan Khiaoto; Sunida Chaturongrattana; Nanthita Boonsukham; Naruemol Chaiwai			

== Results ==
All times are China Standard Time (UTC+08:00)

=== Preliminary round ===
==== Group A ====
Pos	Team	Pld	W	L	T	NR	Pts	NRR	Qualification
1	Indonesia	1	1	0	0	0	2	8.600	Quarterfinals
2	Mongolia	1	0	1	0	0	0	−8.600	Qualification

Source: OCA

19 September
9:00
Scorecard

Indonesia; 187/4 (20 overs)	v	Mongolia; 15 (10 overs)
Ni Luh Ketut Wesika Ratna Dewi 62 (48); Mendbayaryn Enkhzul 1/26 (4 overs)		Batjargalyn Ichinkhorloo 5 (19); Andriani 4/8 (3 overs)

Indonesia won by 172 runs
ZJUT Cricket Field, Hangzhou
Umpires: Ramasamy Venkatesh (HKG) and Sun Mengyao (CHN)

- Mongolia won the toss and elected to field.

==== Group B ====
Pos	Team	Pld	W	L	T	NR	Pts	NRR	Qualification
1	Malaysia	1	1	0	0	0	2	1.100	Quarterfinals
2	Hong Kong	1	0	1	0	0	0	−1.100	Qualification

Source: OCA

19 September
14:00
Scorecard

Malaysia; 104/9 (20 overs)	v	Hong Kong; 82 (20 overs)
Winifred Duraisingam 29 (18); Betty Chan 3/12 (4 overs)		Natasha Miles 15 (9); Nik Nur Atiela 2/14 (4 overs)

Malaysia won by 22 runs
ZJUT Cricket Field, Hangzhou
Umpires: Vrinda Rathi (IND) and Sarika Prasad (SGP)

- Hong Kong won the toss and elected to field.

=== Qualification ===
20 September
9:00
Scorecard

Hong Kong; 202/4 (20 overs)	v	Mongolia; 22 (14.3 overs)
Kary Chan 70 (39); Tsendsürengiin Ariuntsetseg 2/34 (4 overs)		Mendbayaryn Enkhzul 5 (9); Kary Chan 2/3 (2 overs)

Hong Kong won by 180 runs
ZJUT Cricket Field, Hangzhou
Umpires: Mahmood Kharoti (AFG) and Liu Jingmin (CHN)

- Mongolia won the toss and elected to field.

=== Knockout round ===
Quarterfinals
21 September
India	NR
Malaysia
22 September
Bangladesh	NR
Hong Kong
21 September
Pakistan	NR
Indonesia
22 September
Sri Lanka	84/2
Thailand	78/7

Semifinals
24 September
India	52/2
Bangladesh	51
24 September
Pakistan	75/9
Sri Lanka	77/4

Gold medal match
25 September
India	116/7
Sri Lanka	97/8
Bronze medal match
25 September
Bangladesh	65/5
Pakistan	64/9

==== Quarterfinals ====
21 September
9:00
Scorecard

India; 173/2 (15 overs)	v	Malaysia; 1/0 (0.2 overs)
Shafali Verma 67 (39); Mas Elysa 1/26 (2 overs)		Ainna Hamizah Hashim 1* (1)

No result
ZJUT Cricket Field, Hangzhou
Umpires: Asif Yaqoob (PAK) and Anand Natarajan (SGP)

- Malaysia won the toss and elected to field.
- The match was reduced to 15 overs per side due to rain. Rain also prevented any further play in the second innings.
- India won by virtue of being the higher-seeded team.

21 September
14:00
Scorecard

Pakistan	v	Indonesia

Match abandoned
ZJUT Cricket Field, Hangzhou
Umpires: Masudur Rahman (BAN) and Chris Thurgate (JPN)

- No toss.
- No play was possible due to rain.
- Pakistan won by virtue of being the higher-seeded team.

22 September
9:00
Scorecard

Thailand; 78/7 (15 overs)	v	Sri Lanka; 84/2 (10.5 overs)
Chanida Sutthiruang 31* (24); Inoshi Priyadharshani 4/10 (3 overs)		Anushka Sanjeewani 32 (23); Thipatcha Putthawong 2/21 (3 overs)

Sri Lanka won by 8 wickets
ZJUT Cricket Field, Hangzhou
Umpires: Narayanan Sivan (MAS) and Vrinda Rathi (IND)

- Sri Lanka won the toss and elected to field.
- The match was reduced to 15 overs per side due to rain.

22 September
14:00
Scorecard

Bangladesh	v	Hong Kong

Match abandoned
ZJUT Cricket Field, Hangzhou
Umpires: Arif Ansari (THA) and Ruchira Palliyaguruge (SRI)

- No toss.
- No play was possible due to rain.
- Bangladesh won by virtue of being the higher-seeded team.

==== Semifinals ====
24 September
9:00
Scorecard

Bangladesh; 51 (17.5 overs)	v	India; 52/2 (8.2 overs)
Nigar Sultana 12 (17); Pooja Vastrakar 4/17 (4 overs)		Jemimah Rodrigues 20* (15); Fahima Khatun 1/7 (1 over)

India won by 8 wickets
ZJUT Cricket Field, Hangzhou
Umpires: Asif Yaqoob (PAK) and Sarika Prasad (SGP)

- Bangladesh won the toss and elected to bat.

24 September
14:00
Scorecard

Pakistan; 75/9 (20 overs)	v	Sri Lanka; 77/4 (16.3 overs)
Shawaal Zulfiqar 16 (27); Udeshika Prabodhani 3/21 (4 overs)		Harshitha Samarawickrama 23 (41); Sadia Iqbal 1/13 (4 overs)

Sri Lanka won by 6 wickets
ZJUT Cricket Field, Hangzhou
Umpires: Masudur Rahman (BAN) and Mahmood Kharoti (AFG)

- Sri Lanka won the toss and elected to field.

==== Bronze medal match ====
25 September
9:00
Scorecard

Pakistan; 64/9 (20 overs)	v	Bangladesh; 65/5 (18.2 overs)
Aliya Riaz 17 (18); Shorna Akter 3/16 (4 overs)		Shorna Akter 14* (33); Nashra Sandhu 3/10 (4 overs)

Bangladesh won by 5 wickets
ZJUT Cricket Field, Hangzhou
Umpires: Ruchira Palliyaguruge (SRI) and Vrinda Rathi (IND)

- Bangladesh won the toss and elected to field.

==== Gold medal match ====
25 September
14:00
Scorecard

India; 116/7 (20 overs)	v	Sri Lanka; 97/8 (20 overs)
Smriti Mandhana 46 (45); Udeshika Prabodhani 2/16 (3 overs)		Hasini Perera 25 (22); Titas Sadhu 3/6 (4 overs)

India won by 19 runs
ZJUT Cricket Field, Hangzhou
Umpires: Masudur Rahman (BAN) and Mahmood Kharoti (AFG)

- India won the toss and elected to bat.

== Final standing ==
Rank	Team	Pld	W	L	T	NR
1st place, gold medalist(s)	India	3	2	0	0	1
2nd place, silver medalist(s)	Sri Lanka	3	2	1	0	0
3rd place, bronze medalist(s)	Bangladesh	3	1	1	0	1
4	Pakistan	3	0	2	0	1
5	Hong Kong	3	1	1	0	1
5	Indonesia	2	1	0	0	1
5	Malaysia	2	1	0	0	1
5	Thailand	1	0	1	0	0
9	Mongolia	2	0	2	0	0
