= Shathi Rani =

Bangladeshi cricketer

Personal information
- Full name: Shathi Rani Bormon
- Born: 19 June 1998 (age 28)
- Height: 155 cm (5 ft 1 in)
- Batting: Right-handed
- Role: Opening Batter

International information
- National side: Bangladesh
- T20I debut (cap 39): 9 July 2023 v India
- Last T20I: 12 October 2024 v South Africa
- T20I shirt no.: 41

Career statistics
Competition	WT20I
Matches	9
Runs scored	114
Batting average	12.66
100s/50s	0/0
Top score	29
Catches/stumpings	1/0
Medal record
Women's Cricket
Representing Bangladesh
Asian Games
Bronze medal – third place	2022 Hangzhou	Team
- Source: ESPNcricinfo, 12 October 2024

Shathi Rani Bormon (born June 19, 1998) is a Bangladeshi cricketer. She plays for the national team as an opening batter and made her Women's Twenty20 International (T20I) debut in 2023 in the home series against India. She has since played five T20I matches. Rani was part of the team that won a bronze medal at the 2022 Asian Games. She was named in the Bangladesh squad for the 2024 ICC Women's T20 World Cup.
