= Dilara Akter =

Bangladeshi cricketer

Personal information
- Full name: Dilara Akter Dola
- Born: 6 April 2004 (age 22); Dinajpur, Bangladesh
- Batting: Right-handed
- Role: Wicket-keeper, Batter

International information
- National side: Bangladesh
- ODI debut (cap 33): 14 December 2022 v New Zealand
- Last ODI: 17 December 2022 v New Zealand
- T20I debut (cap 34): 2 December 2022 v New Zealand
- Last T20I: 9 May 2024 v India
- T20I shirt no.: 92

Domestic team information
- Years: Team
- 2017: Rangpur Division
- 2022: Mymensingh Division

Career statistics
Competition	ODI	T20I
Matches	2	11
Runs scored	8	121
Batting average	8.00	11.00
100s/50s	0/0	0/0
Top score	8	39
Catches/stumpings	0/0	0/0
- Source: CricketArchive, 28 March 2024

Dilara Akter Dola (Bengali: দিলারা আক্তার দোলা; born 6 April 2004) is a Bangladeshi cricketer who plays for the Bangladesh women's national cricket team as a wicket-keeper and right-hand batter.

== International career ==
In November 2022, Dilara earned her maiden call-up to the national team's ODI and T20I squad for the series against New Zealand. She made both her Twenty20 International (T20I) and One Day International (ODI) debut against New Zealand on 2 December 2022, and 14 December 2024, respectively.

In December 2022, she was selected to Bangladesh women's under-19 cricket team for the 2023 Under-19 Women's T20 World Cup. She scored 110 runs at an average of 36.66 in that tournament.

In January 2023 she was named in Bangladesh's T20I squad for the 2023 ICC Women's T20 World Cup.

In May 2023, she was selected to Bangladesh A team for the inaugural season of ACC Women's T20 Emerging Teams Asia Cup. Bangladesh A team finished as the runners-up in the tournament after 31 runs defeat from India A team in the final.

In July 2023, she was named in the Bangladesh T20I squad for their series against India. But her unimpressive performance she was dropped from the squad.

In March 2024, she was again selected in the T20I squad for Bangladesh's series against Australia.

She was named in the Bangladesh squad for the 2024 ICC Women's T20 World Cup.

Akter was part of the Bangladesh squad for the 2025 Women's Cricket World Cup Qualifier in Pakistan in April 2025.
