= Najiha Alvi =

Pakistani cricketer (born 2002)

Personal information
- Born: 9 December 2002 (age 23)
- Batting: Right handed
- Role: Wicket-keeper

International information
- National side: Pakistan (2023-present)
- ODI debut (cap 91): 4 November 2023 v Bangladesh
- Last ODI: 29 May 2024 v England
- T20I debut (cap 54): 29 October 2023 v Bangladesh
- Last T20I: 3 May 2024 v West Indies
- T20I shirt no.: 25

Domestic team information
- Years: Team
- 2018–2020; 2022: PCB Challengers
- 2020: PCB Dynamites
- 2021: PCB Blasters
- 2023: PCB Strikers
- 2024: Karachi

Career statistics
Competition	WODI	WT20I
Matches	12	8
Runs scored	170	14
Batting average	21.25	4.66
100s/50s	0/0	0/0
Top score	32	7*
Catches/stumpings	3/5	3/2
- Source: ESPNcricinfo, 15 October 2024

Najiha Alvi (born 9 December 2002) is a Pakistani cricketer who plays for Pakistan women's cricket team as a right-handed batter and wicket-keeper. She has also played domestic cricket for Karachi.

== International career ==
In January 2022, she was named in Pakistan's national squad for the 2022 Women's Cricket World Cup.

In July 2023, she was named in Pakistan's squad for the 2022 Asian Games squad. In August 2023, she was selected in Pakistan's squad for the T20I series against South Africa.

In October 2023, she was named in both ODI and T20I squad for the series against Bangladesh. On 29 October 2023, she made her T20I debut in 3rd T20I of the same series. On 4 November 2023, she made her ODI debut against Bangladesh in same series.

She was named as a travelling reserve for the Pakistan squad for the 2024 ICC Women's T20 World Cup and replaced the injured Diana Baig after the opening match.

Alvi was part of the Pakistan squad for the 2025 Women's Cricket World Cup Qualifier at home in April 2025.
