= Devika Vaidya =

Indian cricketer (born 1997)

Personal information
- Full name: Devika Vaidya
- Born: 13 August 1997 (age 29); Pune, Maharashtra, India
- Batting: Left-handed
- Bowling: Right-arm leg break
- Role: All-rounder

International information
- National side: India
- ODI debut (cap 118): 16 November 2016 v West Indies
- Last ODI: 9 April 2018 v England
- T20I debut (cap 49): 30 November 2014 v South Africa
- Last T20I: 20 February 2023 v Ireland

Domestic team information
- Years: Team
- 2010–present: Maharashtra
- 2023: UP Warriorz

Career statistics
Competition	ODI	T20I
Matches	9	1
Runs scored	169	–
Batting average	28.16	–
100s/50s	0/1	–
Top score	89	–
Balls bowled	217	18
Wickets	6	0
Bowling average	22.50	–
5 wickets in innings	0	–
10 wickets in match	0	–
Best bowling	2/11	–
Catches/stumpings	2/0	0/–
Medal record
Representing India
Women's Cricket
Asian Games
Gold medal – first place	2022 Hangzhou	Team
- Source: ESPNcricinfo, 2 February 2023

Devika Vaidya (born 13 August 1997) is an Indian cricketer who plays for Maharashtra in domestic matches and the India women's national team.

Vaidya studied in Maharashtra Mandal in her childhood.

== Career ==
Vaidya was selected for the South Africa tour of India in 2014 and made her Women's Twenty20 International (WT20I) debut at Bangalore on 30 November 2014. She was nominated M. A. Chidambaram Trophy for the best woman junior cricketer 2014–15.

In November 2018, Vaidya was included in India's squad for the 2018 ICC Women's World Twenty20 tournament in the West Indies, replacing Pooja Vastrakar, who was ruled out due to an injury. She was once again included in the Indian Squad for the T20I series against Australia for the 2022–23 series.

== Awards ==
- M. A. Chidambaram Trophy for the best woman junior cricketer 2014–15
