= Marufa Akter =

Bangladeshi cricketer (born 2005)

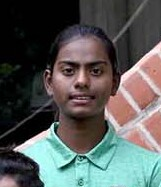
- Marufa in 2024

Personal information
- Full name: Marufa Akter
- Born: 1 January 2005 (age 21); Nilphamari, Bangladesh
- Batting: Right-handed
- Bowling: Right-arm medium fast
- Role: Bowler

International information
- National side: Bangladesh
- ODI debut (cap 31): 11 December 2022 v New Zealand
- Last ODI: 25 January 2025 v West Indies
- T20I debut (cap 35): 4 December 2022 v New Zealand
- Last T20I: 8 December 2023 v South Africa
- T20I shirt no.: 90

Domestic team information
- Years: Team
- 2022: Sylhet Division
- 2022/23: Jamuna

Career statistics
| Competition | ODI | T20I |
|---|---|---|
| Matches | 15 | 23 |
| Runs scored | 47 | 9 |
| Batting average | 9.40 | 1.80 |
| 100s/50s | 0/0 | 0/0 |
| Top score | 15* | 4 |
| Balls bowled | 453 | 394 |
| Wickets | 11 | 18 |
| Bowling average | 31.36 | 23.38 |
| 5 wickets in innings | 0 | 0 |
| 10 wickets in match | 0 | 0 |
| Best bowling | 4/29 | 3/23 |
| Catches/stumpings | 3/– | 3/– |
Medal record
Representing Bangladesh
Women's Cricket
Asian Games
| Bronze medal – third place | 2022 Hangzhou | Team |
- Source: CricketArchive, 20 March 2024

Marufa Akter (Bengali: মারুফা আক্তার. Born 1 January 2005) is a Bangladeshi cricketer who plays for the Bangladesh women's national cricket team as a right-arm medium fast bowler.

== Early life ==
She was born in Nilphamari District of Bangladesh and she lives in Saidpur, a small town in the Nilphamari district. Her father is a farmer. Her older brother encouraged her to play cricket. Her favorite player is Mitchell Starc. In the period of COVID-19 lockdown she handed over her first earnings from cricket in Cox's Bazaar training camp of US$412. Marufa went on to attend the country's biggest sports institution: Bangladesh Krira Shikkha Protishtan (BKSP) where she learnt some of the skills she showed off on the world's biggest stage.

== International career ==
In November 2022, Marufa earned her maiden call-up for the national team of Bangladesh to the ODI and T20I squads for the series against New Zealand. She made her Twenty20 International (T20I) debut against New Zealand in the same series on 4 December 2022. She made her One Day International (ODI) debut against New Zealand on 11 December 2024.

In December 2022, she was selected to Bangladesh women's under-19 cricket team for the 2023 Under-19 Women's T20 World Cup. She took 8 wickets from that tournament with best bowling figures 2/16 in 4 overs against United Arab Emirates women's under-19 cricket team.

In January 2023 she was named in Bangladesh's T20I squad for the 2023 ICC Women's T20 World Cup. She took 4 wickets in that tournament with best bowling figure 3/23 in 4 overs against Sri Lanka.

On 16 July 2023, she took 4 wickets of 29 runs in her 7 overs in the first ODI again India, helping Bangladesh to first win against India in ODIs by 40 runs, and she got Player of the Match award.

In August 2023, she was selected to the national team for the 2022 Asian Games. She was the part of Bronze medal winning team of Bangladesh in that tournament.

In January 2024, Marufa was nominated for Cricinfo Awards 2023 Women's ODI bowling for her maiden four-wicket haul against India, and won that award in the following month.

She was named in the Bangladesh squad for the 2024 ICC Women's T20 World Cup.

Akter was part of the Bangladesh squad for the 2025 Women's Cricket World Cup Qualifier in Pakistan in April 2025.
