= Sultana Khatun =

Bangladeshi cricketer

Personal information
- Full name: Sultana Khatun
- Born: 5 February 1996 (age 30)
- Batting: Right-handed
- Bowling: Right-arm off break
- Role: Bowler

International information
- National side: Bangladesh (2023–present)
- ODI debut (cap 34): 29 April 2023 v Sri Lanka
- Last ODI: 27 March 2024 v Australia
- T20I debut (cap 38): 9 May 2023 v Sri Lanka
- Last T20I: 9 May 2024 v India
- T20I shirt no.: 29

Domestic team information
- Years: Team
- 2011/12–2017: Khulna Division
- 2022: Barisal Division
- 2022/23: Jamuna Women

Career statistics
Competition	WODI	WT20I
Matches	12	12
Runs scored	38	31
Batting average	5.42	6.20
100s/50s	0/0	0/0
Top score	16	12
Balls bowled	552	216
Wickets	12	10
Bowling average	32.33	23.40
5 wickets in innings	0	0
10 wickets in match	0	0
Best bowling	2/32	3/21
Catches/stumpings	1/–	1/–
Medal record
Representing Bangladesh
Women's Cricket
Asian Games
Bronze medal – third place	2022 Hangzhou	Team
- Source: Cricinfo, 17 March 2024

Sultana Khatun (Bengali: সুলতানা খাতুন; born 5 February 1996) is a Bangladeshi cricketer who plays for the Bangladesh women's national cricket team as a right-arm off break bowler.

== International career ==
In April 2023, she earned her maiden call-up for the Bangladesh's T20I and ODI squad for the series against Sri Lanka. She made her One Day International (ODI) debut in the rain-affected first ODI of the series on 29 April 2023. She made her Twenty20 International (T20I) debut against Sri Lanka in the same series on 9 May 2023.

In May 2023, she was selected to Bangladesh A team for the inaugural season of ACC Women's T20 Emerging Teams Asia Cup. Bangladesh A team finished as the runners-up in the tournament after 31 runs defeat from India A team in the final.

In August 2023, she was selected to the national team for the 2022 Asian Games. She was the part of Bronze medal winning team of Bangladesh in that tournament.

She was named in the Bangladesh squad for the 2024 ICC Women's T20 World Cup.
