= Shamima Sultana =

Bangladeshi cricketer

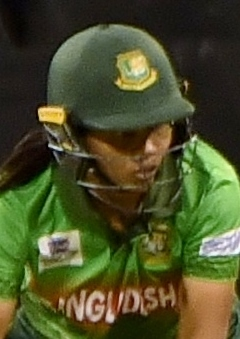
- Shamima batting for Bangladesh during the 2020 ICC Women's T20 World Cup

Personal information
- Full name: Shamima Sultana
- Born: 9 March 1988 (age 38); Gumugura, Bangladesh
- Batting: Right-handed
- Role: Wicket-keeper

International information
- National side: Bangladesh (2014–present)
- ODI debut (cap 22): 6 March 2014 v Pakistan
- Last ODI: 27 March 2022 v England
- T20I debut (cap 23): 8 March 2014 v Pakistan
- Last T20I: 29 October 2023 v Pakistan

Domestic team information
- Years: Team
- 2008/09–2017/18: Dhaka Division
- 2021/22–present: Southern Zone

Career statistics
Competition	WODI	WT20I
Matches	10	47
Runs scored	202	634
Batting average	20.20	14.40
100s/50s	0/1	0/2
Top score	53	51
Catches/stumpings	2/4	16/15
Medal record
Representing Bangladesh
Women's Cricket
Asian Games
Bronze medal – third place	2022 Hangzhou	Team
South Asian Games
Gold medal – first place	2019 Kathmandu/Pokhara	Team
Women's Asia Cup
Winner	2018 Malaysia
- Source: CricketArchive, 21 February 2023

Shamima Sultana (Bengali: শামীমা সুলতানা; born 9 March 1988) is a Bangladeshi cricketer. In June 2018, she was part of Bangladesh's squad that won their first ever Women's Asia Cup title, winning the 2018 Women's Twenty20 Asia Cup tournament. Later the same month, she was named to Bangladesh's squad for the 2018 ICC Women's World Twenty20 Qualifier tournament.

In October 2018, she was named to Bangladesh's squad for the 2018 ICC Women's World Twenty20 tournament in the West Indies. Ahead of the tournament, the International Cricket Council (ICC) named Sultana as one of the players to watch, and as one of the five breakout stars in women's cricket in 2018.

In August 2019, she was named to Bangladesh's squad for the 2019 ICC Women's World Twenty20 Qualifier tournament in Scotland. In November 2019, she was named to Bangladesh's squad for the cricket tournament at the 2019 South Asian Games. The Bangladesh team beat Sri Lanka by two runs in the final to win the gold medal. In January 2020, she was named to Bangladesh's squad for the 2020 ICC Women's T20 World Cup in Australia. In January 2022, she was named in Bangladesh's team for both the 2022 Commonwealth Games Cricket Qualifier tournament in Malaysia, and the 2022 Women's Cricket World Cup in New Zealand.
