= Inoka Ranaweera =

Sri Lankan cricketer

Personal information
- Born: 18 February 1986 (age 40); Balapitiya, Sri Lanka
- Batting: Left-handed
- Bowling: Slow left-arm orthodox
- Role: Bowler

International information
- National side: Sri Lanka
- ODI debut (cap 52): 12 April 2012 v India
- Last ODI: 7 July 2022 v India
- ODI shirt no.: 18
- T20I debut (cap 27): 26 September 2012 v India
- Last T20I: 6 September 2023 v England
- T20I shirt no.: 18

Career statistics
Competition	WODI	WT20I
Matches	65	51
Runs scored	196	29
Batting average	8.52	3.22
100s/50s	0/0	0/0
Top score	32*	8*
Balls bowled	3013	1046
Wickets	70	49
Bowling average	31.18	20.79
5 wickets in innings	0	0
10 wickets in match	0	0
Best bowling	4/39	3/9
Catches/stumpings	13/–	6/–
Medal record
Representing Sri Lanka
Women's Cricket
Asian Games
Silver medal – second place	2022 Hangzhou	Team
Bronze medal – third place	2014 Incheon	Team
- Source: Cricinfo, 12 February 2023

Inoka Ranaweera (born 18 February 1986) is a Sri Lankan cricketer and former One Day International (ODI) captain of the women's national team. She has played both ODIs and Twenty20 Internationals (T20Is) for Sri Lanka. In an ODI against New Zealand in November 2015, she took three wickets off the last three balls of the innings, becoming the first Sri Lankan woman to take an ODI hat-trick.

She won the Sri Lanka Cricket award for the Women's ODI Bowler of the Year in 2016 and 2017. In October 2021, she was named in Sri Lanka's team for the 2021 Women's Cricket World Cup Qualifier tournament in Zimbabwe. In January 2022, she was named in Sri Lanka's team for the 2022 Commonwealth Games Cricket Qualifier tournament in Malaysia. In July 2022, she was named in Sri Lanka's team for the cricket tournament at the 2022 Commonwealth Games in Birmingham, England. She was named in the Sri Lanka squad for the 2024 ICC Women's T20 World Cup.

== See also ==
- List of women's international cricket hat-tricks
