= Achini Kulasuriya =

Sri Lankan cricketer (born 1990)

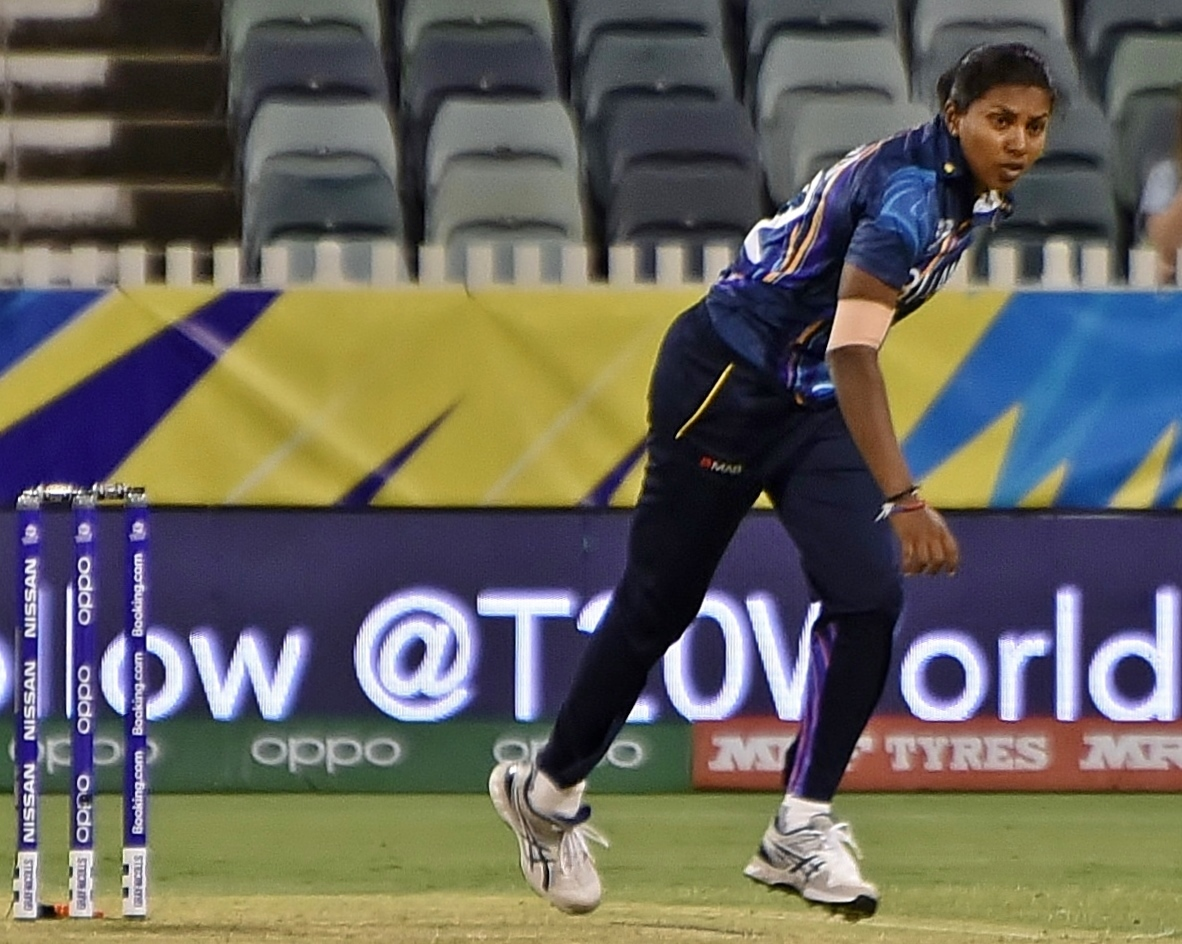
- Kulasuriya bowling for Sri Lanka during the 2020 ICC Women's T20 World Cup

Personal information
- Full name: Waliarawe Gedara Achini Kalhari Kaushalya Kulasuriya
- Born: 7 June 1990 (age 36); Matale, Sri Lanka
- Height: 5 ft 4 in (1.63 m)
- Batting: Left-handed
- Bowling: Right arm slow-medium

International information
- National side: Sri Lanka
- ODI debut (cap 64): 10 November 2015 v New Zealand
- Last ODI: 4 July 2022 v India
- T20I debut (cap 39): 22 November 2015 v New Zealand
- Last T20I: 19 February 2023 v New Zealand
- T20I shirt no.: 22
Medal record
Representing Sri Lanka
Women's Cricket
Asian Games
Silver medal – second place	2022 Hangzhou	Team
Women's Asia Cup
Winner	2024 Sri Lanka
- Source: ESPNcricinfo, 19 February 2023

Achini Kulasuriya (born 7 June 1990) is a Sri Lankan cricketer who plays for the national women's cricket team. She made her One Day International (ODI) debut against New Zealand on 10 November 2015. In January 2020, she was named in Sri Lanka's squad for the 2020 ICC Women's T20 World Cup in Australia. In October 2021, she was named in Sri Lanka's team for the 2021 Women's Cricket World Cup Qualifier tournament in Zimbabwe. In January 2022, she was picked in the Sri Lankan team for the 2022 Commonwealth Games Cricket Qualifier tournament in Malaysia. She was a member of Sri Lanka's squad for the cricket tournament at the 2022 Commonwealth Games in Birmingham, England and for the 2024 ICC Women's T20 World Cup.
