= Sanjida Akter Meghla =

Bangladeshi cricketer (born 2001)

Sanjida Akter Maghla
Personal information
- Born: 4 June 2001 (age 25); Jessore, Bangladesh
- Batting: Right-handed
- Bowling: Slow left-arm orthodox
- Role: Bowler

International information
- National side: Bangladesh
- ODI debut (cap 38): 19 January 2025 v West Indies
- Last ODI: 7 October 2025 v England
- ODI shirt no.: 42
- T20I debut (cap 29): 30 October 2019 v Pakistan
- Last T20I: 29 October 2023 v Pakistan

Domestic team information
- Years: Team
- 2017–2017/18: Chittagong Division

Career statistics
Competition	ODI	T20I
Matches	1	15
Runs scored	–	3
Batting average	–	–
100s/50s	–	0/0
Top score	–	2*
Balls bowled	18	299
Wickets	0	15
Bowling average	–	15.20
5 wickets in innings	–	0
10 wickets in match	–	0
Best bowling	–	2/4
Catches/stumpings	0/–	4/–
Medal record
Representing Bangladesh
Women's Cricket
Asian Games
Bronze medal – third place	2022 Hangzhou	Team
- Source: ESPNcricinfo, 13 February 2023

Sanjida Akter Maghla (Bengali: সানজিদা আক্তার মেঘলা; born 4 June 2001) is a Bangladeshi cricketer who plays as a slow left-arm orthodox bowler for the Bangladesh.

== Career ==
In October 2019, Meghla was named in Bangladesh's squad for their series against Pakistan. She made her Twenty20 International (T20I) debut for Bangladesh, against Pakistan, on 30 October 2019.

In November 2021, she was named in Bangladesh's One Day International (ODI) squad for their series against Zimbabwe, and for the 2021 Women's Cricket World Cup Qualifier tournament, also in Zimbabwe. In January 2022, she was named in Bangladesh's team for the 2022 Commonwealth Games Cricket Qualifier tournament in Malaysia. Later the same month, she was named as one of two reserve players in Bangladesh's team for the 2022 Women's Cricket World Cup in New Zealand.

Meghla was part of the Bangladesh squad for the 2025 Women's Cricket World Cup Qualifier in Pakistan in April 2025.
