= Anushka Sanjeewani =

Sri Lankan cricketer (born 1990)

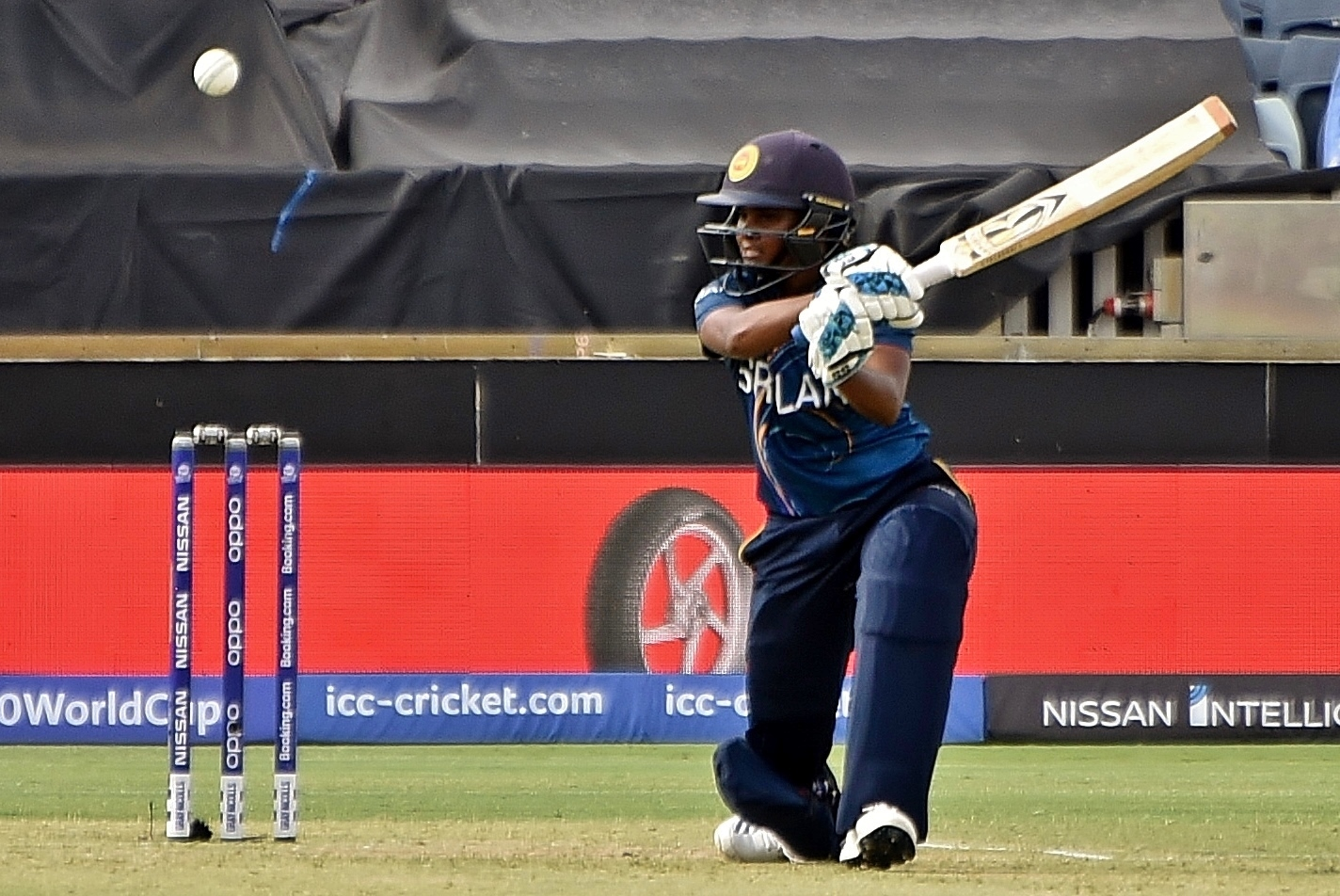
- Sanjeewani batting for Sri Lanka during the 2020 ICC Women's T20 World Cup

Personal information
- Full name: Meegama Acharige Anushka Sanjeewani
- Born: 24 January 1990 (age 36); Galle, Sri Lanka
- Batting: Right-handed
- Role: Wicket-keeper

International information
- National side: Sri Lanka
- ODI debut (cap 58): 23 January 2014 v India
- Last ODI: 7 July 2022 v India
- T20I debut (cap 34): 28 March 2018 v Pakistan
- Last T20I: 6 September 2023 v England
- T20I shirt no.: 17

Career statistics
Competition	WODI	WT20I
Matches	22	36
Runs scored	282	409
Batting average	12.81	17.04
100s/50s	0/0	0/1
Top score	46	61
Catches/stumpings	9/4	3/11
Medal record
Representing Sri Lanka
Women's Cricket
Women's Asia Cup
Winner	2024 Sri Lanka
Asian Games
Silver medal – second place	2022 Hangzhou	Team
Silver medal – second place	2026 Aichi–Nagoya	Team
Bronze medal – third place	2014 Incheon	Team
- Source: Cricinfo, 12 February 2023

Anushka Sanjeewani (Sinhala: අනුෂ්කා සංජීවනී, [anuʃka: saŋd͡ʒi:ʋəni:]; born 24 January 1990) is a Sri Lankan cricketer who plays for the national women's cricket team. A right-handed batter and wicket-keeper, Sanjeewani made her One Day International (ODI) debut against India on 23 January 2014. In January 2020, her name was included in the Sri Lankan squad for the 2020 ICC Women's T20 World Cup in Australia. In October 2021, she was named in Sri Lanka's team for the 2021 Women's Cricket World Cup Qualifier tournament in Zimbabwe. In January 2022, she was named in Sri Lanka's team for the 2022 Commonwealth Games Cricket Qualifier tournament in Malaysia. In July 2022, she was named in Sri Lanka's team for the cricket tournament at the 2022 Commonwealth Games in Birmingham, England. She was named in the Sri Lanka squad for the 2024 ICC Women's T20 World Cup.
