= Udeshika Prabodhani =

Sri Lankan cricketer (born 1985)

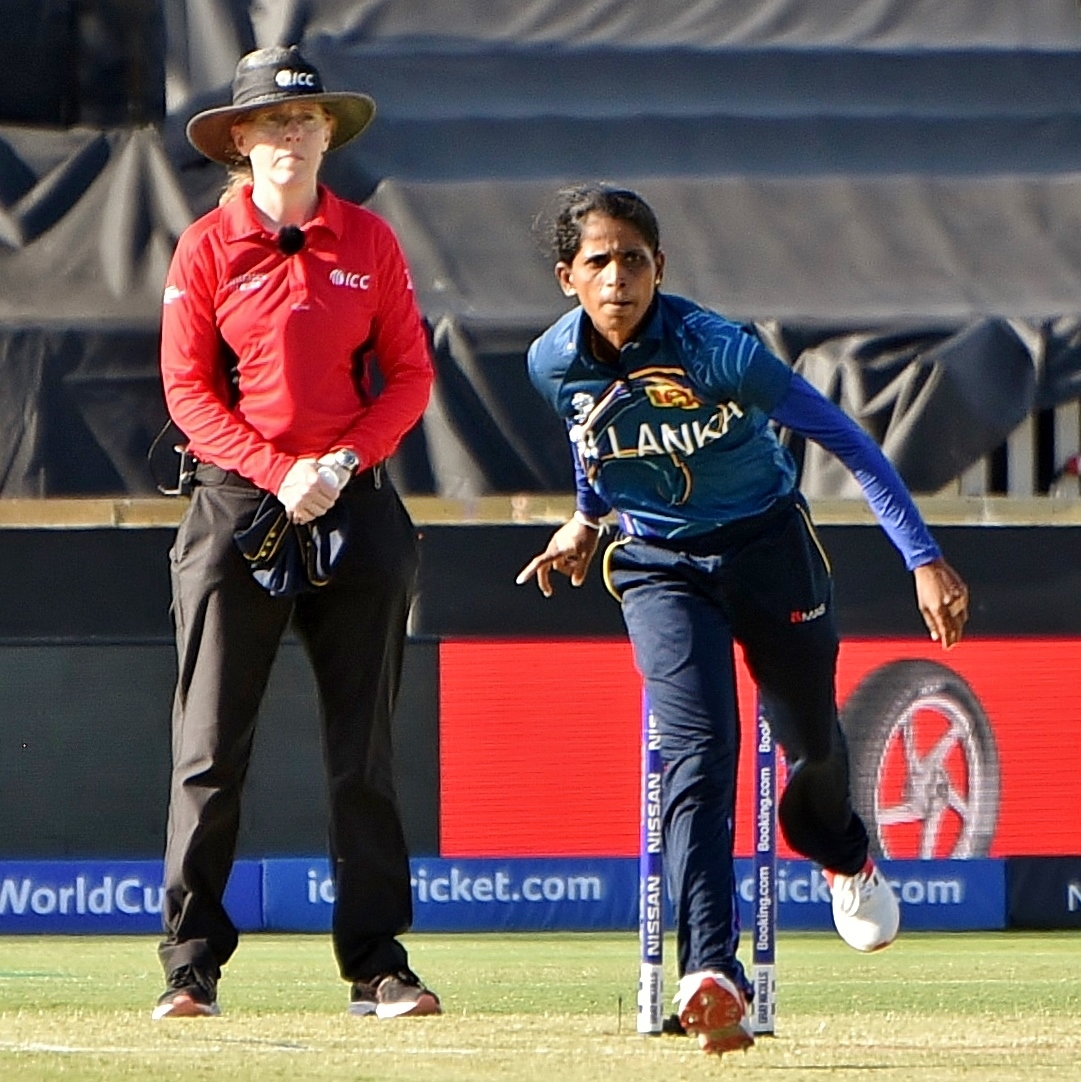
- Prabodhani bowling for Sri Lanka during the 2020 ICC Women's T20 World Cup

Personal information
- Full name: Kaluwa Dewage Udeshika Prabodhani
- Born: 20 September 1985 (age 41); Darga Town, Sri Lanka
- Batting: Right-handed
- Bowling: Left arm medium

International information
- National side: Sri Lanka
- ODI debut (cap 43): 7 February 2009 v Pakistan
- Last ODI: 30 September 2025 v India
- T20I debut (cap 8): 12 June 2009 v Pakistan
- Last T20I: 6 September 2023 v England
- T20I shirt no.: 55

Career statistics
Competition	WODI	WT20I
Matches	56	78
Runs scored	201	114
Batting average	6.93	6.33
100s/50s	0/0	0/0
Top score	21	14
Balls bowled	2,038	1,464
Wickets	30	51
Bowling average	48.33	25.41
5 wickets in innings	0	0
10 wickets in match	0	0
Best bowling	3/35	3/16
Catches/stumpings	6/–	15/–
Medal record
Representing Sri Lanka
Women's Cricket
Asian Games
Silver medal – second place	2022 Hangzhou	Team
Bronze medal – third place	2014 Incheon	Team
Women's Asia Cup
Winner	2024 Sri Lanka
- Source: Cricinfo, 9 July 2022

Kaluwa Dewage Udeshika Prabodhani (born 20 September 1985) is a Sri Lankan cricketer who plays for the national women's cricket team. In October 2018, she was named in Sri Lanka's squad for the 2018 ICC Women's World Twenty20 tournament in the West Indies. She was the joint-leading wicket-taker for Sri Lanka in the tournament, with four dismissals in three matches. In January 2020, she was named in Sri Lanka's squad for the 2020 ICC Women's T20 World Cup in Australia. In October 2021, she was named in Sri Lanka's team for the 2021 Women's Cricket World Cup Qualifier tournament in Zimbabwe. In January 2022, she was included in Sri Lanka's squad for the 2022 Commonwealth Games Cricket Qualifier tournament in Malaysia and, in July 2022, in the national team for the cricket tournament at the 2022 Commonwealth Games in Birmingham, England. She was named in the Sri Lanka squad for the 2024 ICC Women's T20 World Cup, where in a warm-up match against her two wickets for three runs helped Sri Lanka down Scotland.
