= Nigar Sultana (cricketer) =

Bangladeshi cricketer (born 1997)

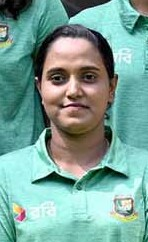
- Nigar in 2024

Personal information
- Full name: Nigar Sultana Joty
- Born: 1 August 1997 (age 29)
- Nickname: Joty
- Batting: Right-handed
- Role: Wicket-keeper

International information
- National side: Bangladesh (2015–present)
- ODI debut (cap 24): 6 October 2015 v Pakistan
- Last ODI: 27 March 2024 v Australia
- T20I debut (cap 25): 30 September 2015 v Pakistan
- Last T20I: 12 October 2024 v South Africa
- T20I shirt no.: 1

Domestic team information
- Years: Team
- 2017–2017/18: Mymensingh Division
- 2021/22–present: Western Zone

Career statistics
Competition	WODI	WT20I
Matches	47	103
Runs scored	897	2,048
Batting average	23.60	27.30
100s/50s	0/5	1/8
Top score	73	113*
Catches/stumpings	26/16	22/46
Medal record
Representing Bangladesh
Women's Cricket
Asian Games
Bronze medal – third place	2022 Hangzhou	Team
South Asian Games
Gold medal – first place	2019 Kathmandu/Pokhara	Team
Women's Asia Cup
Winner	2018 Malaysia
- Source: Cricinfo, 12 October 2024

Nigar Sultana (Bengali: নিগার সুলতানা; born 1 August 1997) is a Bangladeshi cricketer and captain of the Bangladesh women's national cricket team in the WODI and the WT20I formats. She is a wicketkeeper and right-handed middle-order batter.

== Biography ==
In June 2018, she was part of Bangladesh's squad that won their first ever Women's Asia Cup title, winning the 2018 Women's Twenty20 Asia Cup tournament. Later the same month, she was named in Bangladesh's squad for the 2018 ICC Women's World Twenty20 Qualifier tournament.

In October 2018, she was named in Bangladesh's squad for the 2018 ICC Women's World Twenty20 tournament in the West Indies. In August 2019, she was named in Bangladesh's squad for the 2019 ICC Women's World Twenty20 Qualifier tournament in Scotland. In October 2019, she was named in the Women's Global Development Squad, ahead of a five-match series in Australia. In November 2019, she was named in Bangladesh's squad for the cricket tournament at the 2019 South Asian Games. The Bangladesh team beat Sri Lanka by two runs in the final to win the gold medal.

In January 2020, she was named in Bangladesh's squad for the 2020 ICC Women's T20 World Cup in Australia. She was the leading run-scorer for Bangladesh in the tournament, with 114 runs in four matches.

In November 2021, she was named as the captain of Bangladesh's team for the 2021 Women's Cricket World Cup Qualifier tournament in Zimbabwe. In January 2022, she was named as the captain of Bangladesh's team for the 2022 Commonwealth Games Cricket Qualifier tournament in Malaysia. Later the same month, she was named as the captain of Bangladesh's team for the 2022 Women's Cricket World Cup in New Zealand.

Sultana named captain of the Bangladesh squad for the 2024 ICC Women's T20 World Cup and played her 100th Twenty20 International (T20I) match on 3 October 2024 against Scotland in the opening match of the tournament . She became first Bangladeshi female cricketer to achieve this feat. She was named in the ICC's Best XI for the World Cup. The ICC highlighted her impressive performance, stating, "Nigar Sultana Joty takes the gloves following an impressive competition." She led Bangladesh to their first Women's T20 World Cup win in 10 years against Scotland and made significant contributions with the bat, scoring 39 against the West Indies and 32 not out against South Africa. Joty accumulated 104 runs across four innings at an average of 34.66, but her standout performance came as a wicketkeeper, with six stumpings and one catch, totaling seven dismissals — the most by any wicketkeeper in the tournament.

Sultana was captain of the Bangladesh squad for the 2025 Women's Cricket World Cup Qualifier in Pakistan in April 2025.
