= Nilakshi de Silva =

Sri Lankan cricketer (born 1989)

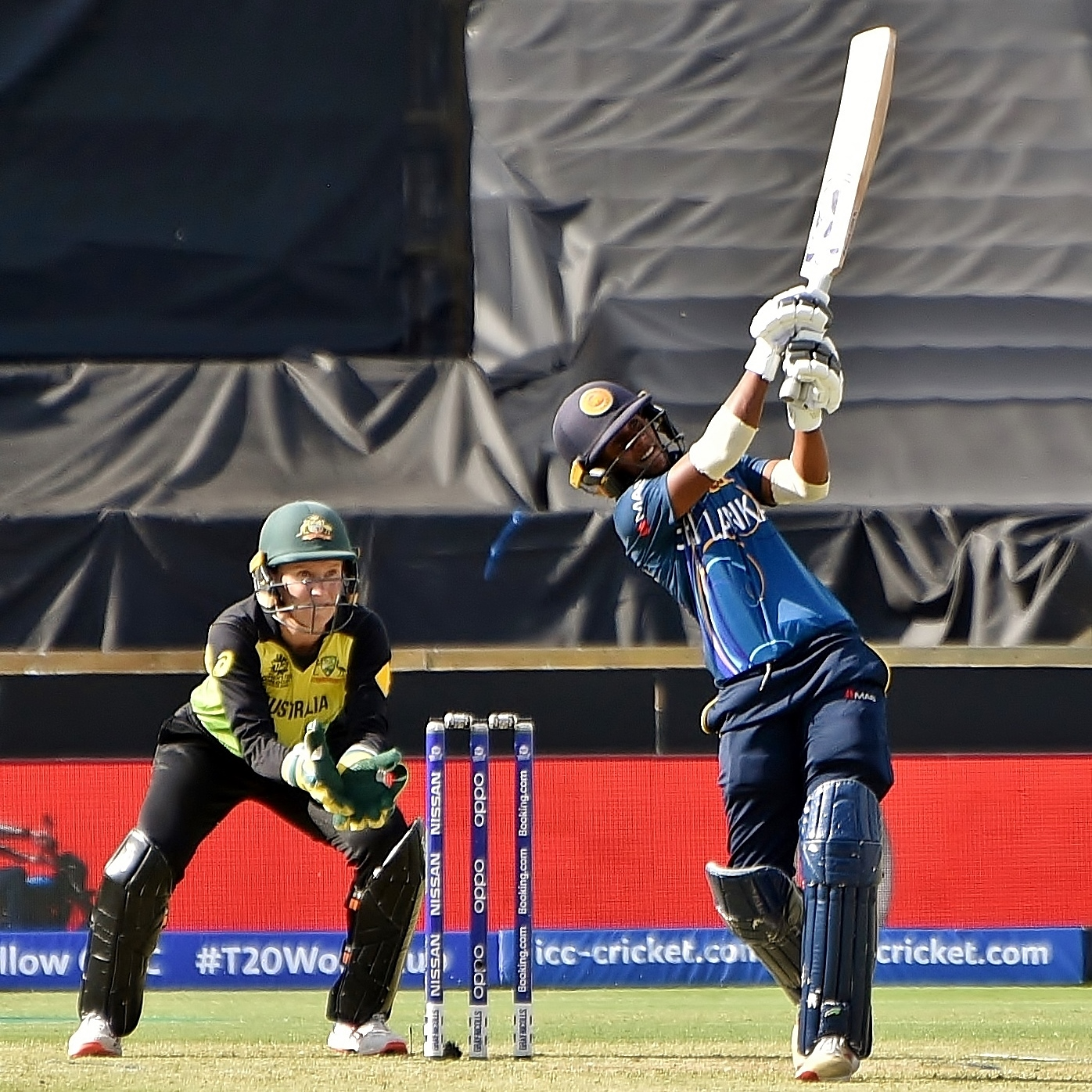
- De Silva batting for Sri Lanka during the 2020 ICC Women's T20 World Cup

Personal information
- Full name: Nishanka Nilakshi Damayanthi de Silva
- Born: 27 September 1989 (age 37); Panadura, Sri Lanka
- Height: 5 ft 4 in (163 cm)
- Batting: Right-handed
- Bowling: Right-arm slow-medium

International information
- National side: Sri Lanka
- ODI debut (cap 63): 3 November 2015 v New Zealand
- Last ODI: 3 July 2023 v New Zealand
- T20I debut (cap 30): 7 March 2013 v West Indies
- Last T20I: 6 September 2023 v England
- T20I shirt no.: 27

Career statistics
Competition	WODI	WT20I
Matches	30	67
Runs scored	520	795
Batting average	22.60	17.25
100s/50s	0/0	0/1
Top score	48*	63*
Balls bowled	318	217
Wickets	4	11
Bowling average	76.50	21.63
5 wickets in innings	0	0
10 wickets in match	0	0
Best bowling	1/27	3/13
Catches/stumpings	10/–	30/–
Medal record
Women's cricket
Representing Sri Lanka
Asia Cup
Winner	2024 Sri Lanka
Runner-up	2026 UAE
Asian Games
Silver medal – second place	2022 Hangzhou
Bronze medal – third place	2014 Incheon
- Source: Cricinfo, 3 July 2023

Nilakshi de Silva (born 27 September 1989) is a Sri Lankan cricketer who plays for the women's national team. She made her One Day International debut for Sri Lanka Women against New Zealand in the ICC Champions Trophy on 3 November 2015. A right-arm slow-medium bowler, she was the leading wicket-taker for Sri Lanka in the 2018 Women's Twenty20 Asia Cup, with seven dismissals in five matches.

In October 2018, she was named in Sri Lanka's squad for the 2018 ICC Women's World Twenty20 tournament in the West Indies. In January 2020, she was named in Sri Lanka's squad for the 2020 ICC Women's T20 World Cup in Australia. In October 2021, she was included in Sri Lanka's squad for the 2021 Women's Cricket World Cup Qualifier tournament in Zimbabwe. In January 2022, she was named in Sri Lanka's team for the 2022 Commonwealth Games Cricket Qualifier tournament in Malaysia. She was part of Sri Lanka's team for the cricket tournament at the 2022 Commonwealth Games in Birmingham, England, and for the 2024 ICC Women's T20 World Cup.
