= Nahida Akter =

Bangladeshi cricketer (born 2000)

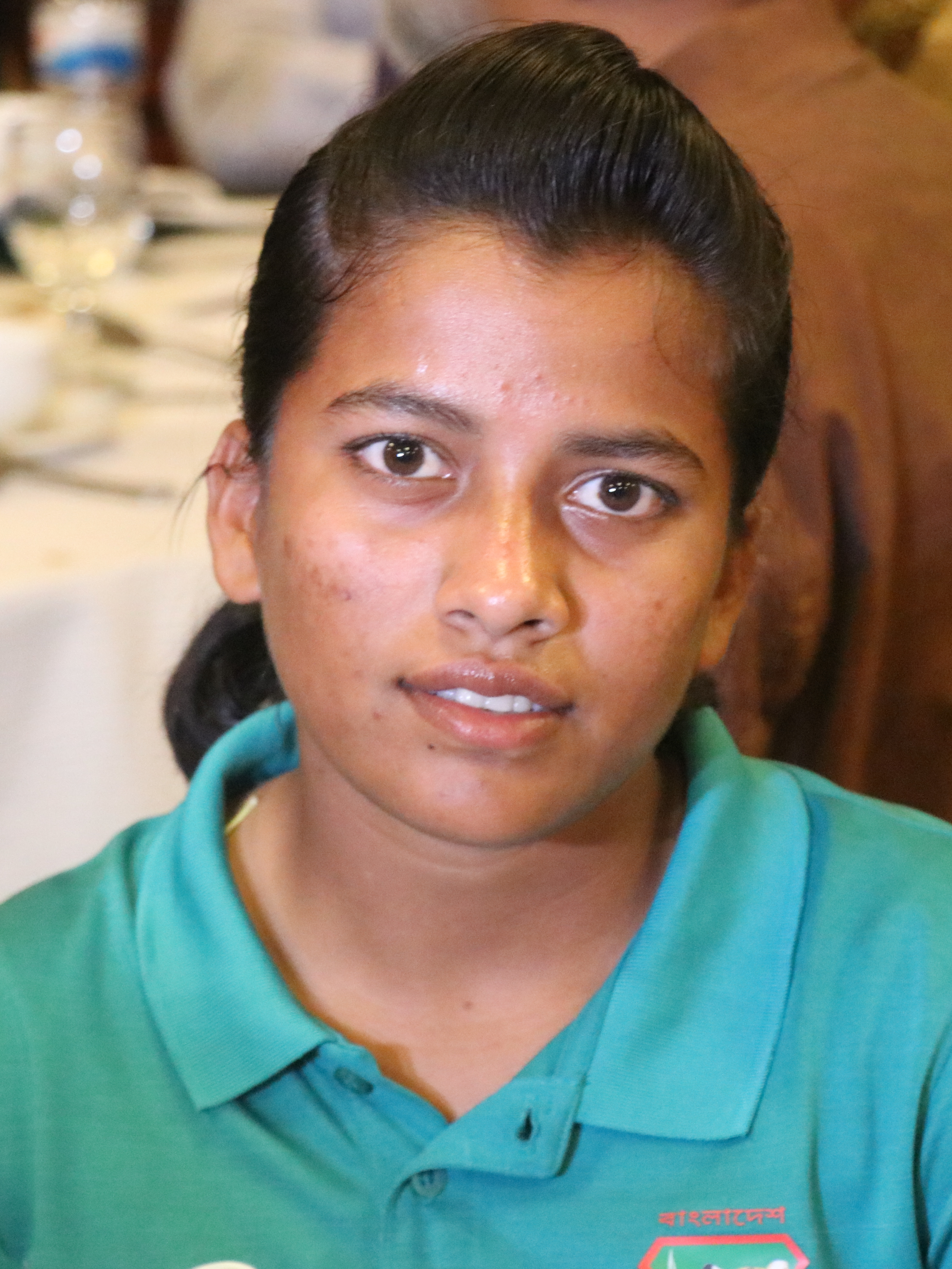
- Nahida Akter in 2018

Personal information
- Full name: Nahida Akter
- Born: 2 March 2000 (age 26)
- Batting: Right-handed
- Bowling: Slow left-arm orthodox
- Role: Bowler

International information
- National side: Bangladesh (2015–present)
- ODI debut (cap 23): 4 October 2015 v Pakistan
- Last ODI: 10 November 2023 v Pakistan
- T20I debut (cap 24): 30 September 2015 v Pakistan
- Last T20I: 29 October 2023 v Pakistan
- T20I shirt no.: 32

Domestic team information
- Years: Team
- 2017: Barisal Division
- 2021/22–present: Northern Zone

Career statistics
Competition	WODI	WT20I
Matches	43	56
Runs scored	131	37
Batting average	5.50	7.40
100s/50s	0/0	0/0
Top score	25*	9
Balls bowled	1,927	1,099
Wickets	53	71
Bowling average	22.67	13.71
5 wickets in innings	1	1
10 wickets in match	0	0
Best bowling	5/21	5/12
Catches/stumpings	11/–	15/–
Medal record
Representing Bangladesh
Women's Cricket
Asian Games
Bronze medal – third place	2022 Hangzhou	Team
South Asian Games
Gold medal – first place	2019 Kathmandu/Pokhara	Team
Women's Asia Cup
Winner	2018 Malaysia
- Source: CricketArchive, 21 February 2023

Nahida Akter (Bengali: নাহিদা আক্তার; born 2 March 2000) is a Bangladeshi cricketer. She is a right handed batter and a slow left-arm orthodox bowler.

== Career ==
Akter made her debut in international matches against Pakistan in a T20 match on 30 September 2015.

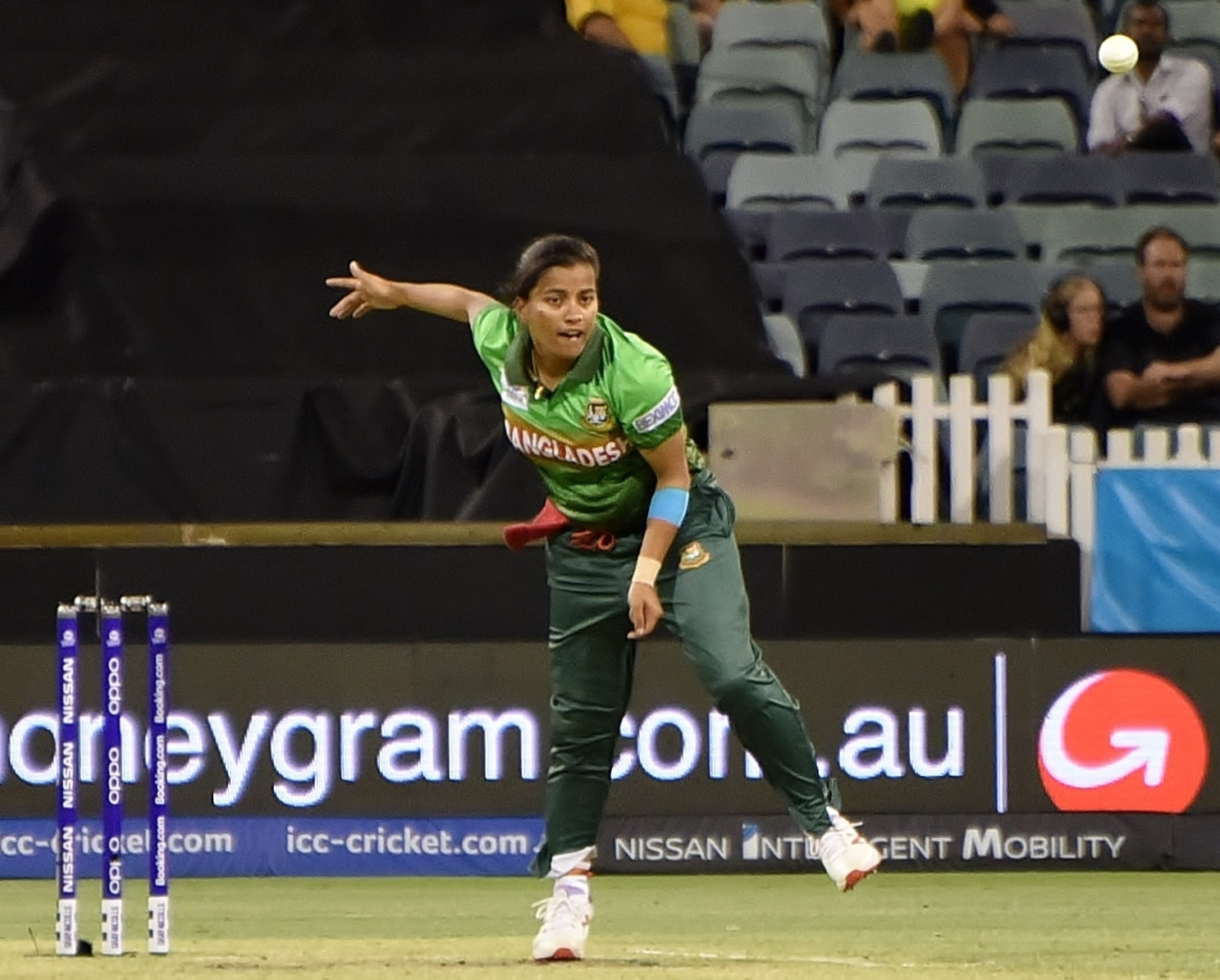
Nahida bowling for Bangladesh during the 2020 ICC Women's T20 World Cup

In June 2018, she was part of Bangladesh's squad that won the 2018 Women's Twenty20 Asia Cup tournament, the team's first Women's Asia Cup title. Later the same month, she was named in Bangladesh's squad for the 2018 ICC Women's World Twenty20 Qualifier tournament.

In October 2018, she was named in Bangladesh's squad for the 2018 ICC Women's World Twenty20 tournament in the West Indies. In August 2019, she was named in Bangladesh's squad for the 2019 ICC Women's World Twenty20 Qualifier tournament in Scotland. She was the leading wicket-taker for Bangladesh in the tournament, with ten dismissals in five matches. In November 2019, she was named in Bangladesh's squad for the cricket tournament at the 2019 South Asian Games. The Bangladesh team beat Sri Lanka by two runs in the final to win the gold medal.

In January 2020, she was named in Bangladesh's squad for the 2020 ICC Women's T20 World Cup in Australia, and in November 2021, in the squad for the 2021 Women's Cricket World Cup Qualifier tournament in Zimbabwe. In Bangladesh's third match against Zimbabwe, she took her first five-wicket haul in WODI cricket (5/21).

In January 2022, she was named in Bangladesh's team for the 2022 Commonwealth Games Cricket Qualifier tournament in Malaysia. In Bangladesh's second match of the tournament, against Kenya, she took her first five-wicket haul in WT20Is (5/12). Later the same month, she was named in Bangladesh's team for the 2022 Women's Cricket World Cup in New Zealand.

She was named in the Bangladesh squad for the 2024 ICC Women's T20 World Cup.

Akter was part of the Bangladesh squad for the 2025 Women's Cricket World Cup Qualifier in Pakistan in April 2025.
