= Fahima Khatun =

Bangladeshi cricketer

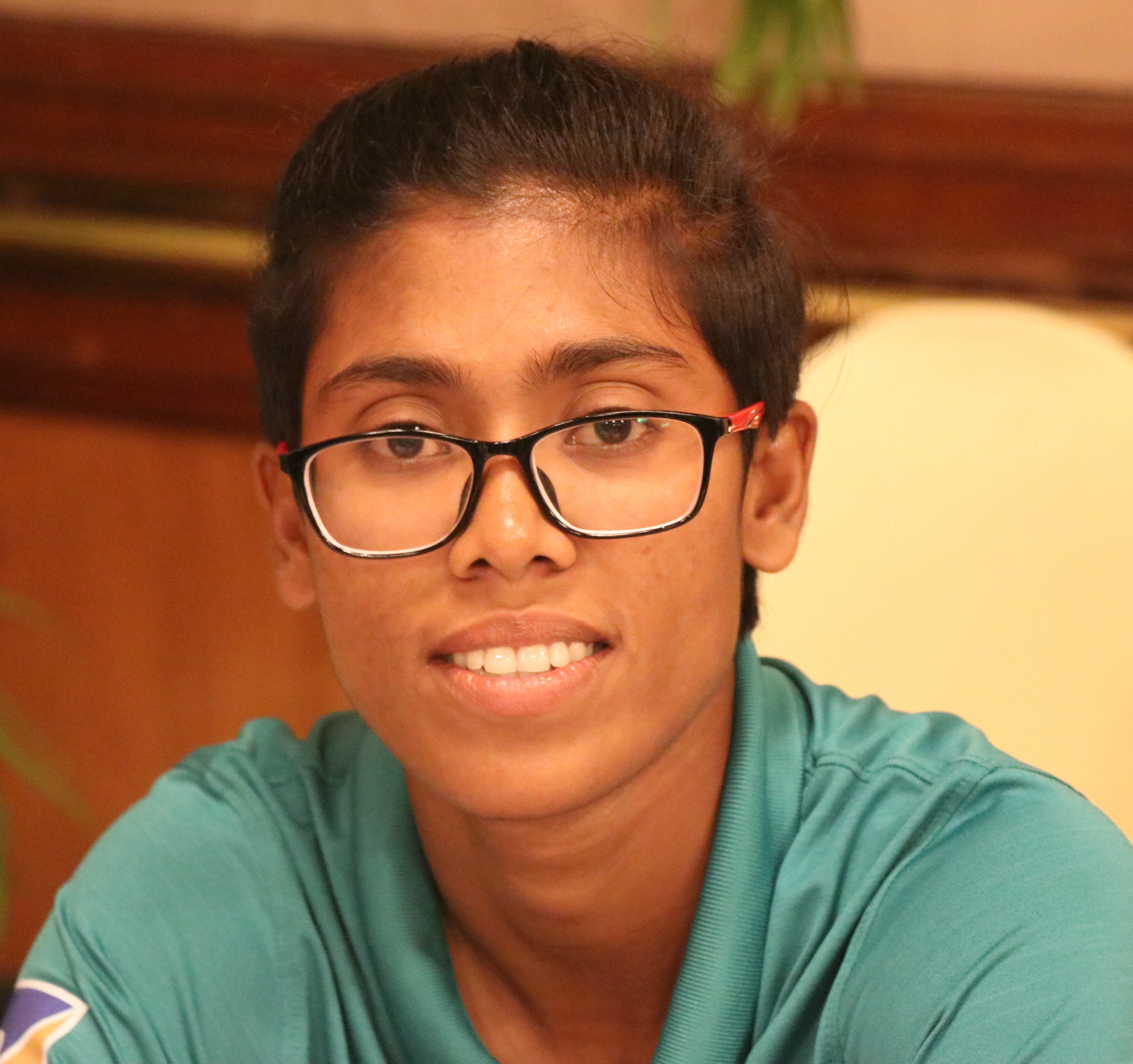
- Fahima Khatun in 2018

Personal information
- Full name: Fahima Khatun
- Born: 2 November 1992 (age 34)
- Batting: Right-handed
- Bowling: Right-arm leg break
- Role: Bowler

International information
- National side: Bangladesh (2013–present)
- ODI debut (cap 17): 8 April 2013 v India
- Last ODI: 27 March 2024 v Australia
- T20I debut (cap 19): 5 April 2013 v India
- Last T20I: 12 October 2024 v South Africa
- T20I shirt no.: 9

Domestic team information
- Years: Team
- 2008/09–2009/10: Barisal Division
- 2010/11: Khulna Division
- 2012/13: Barisal Division
- 2017–2017/18: Chittagong Division
- 2021/22–present: Western Zone

Career statistics
Competition	WODI	WT20I
Matches	39	88
Runs scored	227	402
Batting average	9.45	9.80
100s/50s	0/0	0/0
Top score	46*	32*
Balls bowled	1,170	1,363
Wickets	22	54
Bowling average	40.54	24.14
5 wickets in innings	0	0
10 wickets in match	0	0
Best bowling	3/38	4/8
Catches/stumpings	14/–	32/–
Medal record
Representing Bangladesh
Women's Cricket
Asian Games
Silver medal – second place	2014 Incheon	Team
Bronze medal – third place	2022 Hangzhou	Team
South Asian Games
Gold medal – first place	2019 Kathmandu/Pokhara	Team
Women's Asia Cup
Winner	2018 Malaysia
- Source: Cricinfo, 10 October 2024

Fahima Khatun (Bengali: ফাহিমা খাতুন; born 2 November 1992) is a Bangladeshi cricketer who plays for the Bangladesh women's national cricket team. In May 2018, in a 50 over tour match in South Africa, she took eight wickets for five runs in ten overs. She was the first cricketer for Bangladesh to take a hat-trick in a Women's Twenty20 International match.

== Career ==
In June 2018, she was part of Bangladesh's squad that won the 2018 Women's Twenty20 Asia Cup tournament, their first ever Women's Asia Cup title. Later the same month, she was named in Bangladesh's squad for the 2018 ICC Women's World Twenty20 Qualifier tournament. In the tournament match against the United Arab Emirates on 10 July 2018, she took a hat-trick in WT20Is.

In October 2018, she was named in Bangladesh's squad for the 2018 ICC Women's World Twenty20 tournament in the West Indies. In August 2019, she was named in Bangladesh's squad for the 2019 ICC Women's World Twenty20 Qualifier tournament in Scotland. In November 2019, she was named in Bangladesh's squad for the cricket tournament at the 2019 South Asian Games. The Bangladesh team beat Sri Lanka by two runs in the final to win the gold medal.

In January 2020, she was named in Bangladesh's squad for the 2020 ICC Women's T20 World Cup in Australia. In November 2021, she was named in Bangladesh's team for the 2021 Women's Cricket World Cup Qualifier tournament in Zimbabwe. In January 2022, she was named in Bangladesh's team for the 2022 Commonwealth Games Cricket Qualifier tournament in Malaysia. Later the same month, she was named in Bangladesh's team for the 2022 Women's Cricket World Cup in New Zealand.

She was named in the Bangladesh squad for the 2024 ICC Women's T20 World Cup.

Khatun was part of the Bangladesh squad for the 2025 Women's Cricket World Cup Qualifier in Pakistan in April 2025.

== Education ==
She is a student of the Law department at Islamic University, Bangladesh in Kushtia.
