= Pakistan women's cricket team in Sri Lanka in 2026 =

International cricket tour

	Sri Lanka	Pakistan
- Dates: 23 July – 4 August 2026
Captains	Chamari Athapaththu	Fatima Sana (ODIs); Muneeba Ali (T20Is)

One Day International series
- Results: Sri Lanka won the 3-match series 2–1
Most runs	Harshitha Samarawickrama (173)	Sidra Amin (157)
Most wickets	Kavisha Dilhari (6)	Nashra Sandhu (4)
- Player of the series: Harshitha Samarawickrama (SL)

Twenty20 International series
- Results: Sri Lanka won the 3-match series 2–1
Most runs	Imesha Dulani (123)	Shawaal Zulfiqar (132)
Most wickets	Kavisha Dilhari (5)	Umm-e-Hani (4)
- Player of the series: Imesha Dulani (SL)

The Pakistan women's cricket team toured Sri Lanka in July and August 2026 to play the Sri Lanka women's cricket team. The tour consisted of three One Day International (ODI) and three Twenty20 International (T20I) matches. The ODI series formed part of the 2025–2029 ICC Women's Championship. In June 2026, Sri Lanka Cricket (SLC) confirmed the fixtures for the tour, as a part of the 2026 home international season.

== Squads ==
Sri Lanka		Pakistan	
ODIs	T20Is	ODIs	T20Is
Chamari Athapaththu (c); Kavisha Dilhari; Imesha Dulani; Vishmi Gunaratne; Hansima Karunaratne; Kawya Kavindi; Nimasha Meepage; Hasini Perera; Inoka Ranaweera; Harshitha Samarawickrama; Anushka Sanjeewani (wk); Rashmika Sewwandi; Nilakshi de Silva; Dewmi Vihanga; Chethana Vimukthi	Chamari Athapaththu (c); Kavisha Dilhari; Imesha Dulani; Vishmi Gunaratne; Kawya Kavindi; Sanjana Kavindi; Sugandika Kumari; Malki Madara; Nimasha Meepage; Kaushini Nuthyangana; Hasini Perera; Chamudi Praboda; Harshitha Samarawickrama (wk); Rashmika Sewwandi; Nilakshi de Silva	Fatima Sana (c); Waheeda Akhtar; Muneeba Ali (wk); Najiha Alvi (wk); Sidra Ameen; Maham Anees; Gull Feroza; Umm-e-Hani; Saira Jabeen; Momina Riasat; Tasmia Rubab; Nashra Sandhu; Syeda Aroob Shah; Sadaf Shamas; Ayesha Zafar	Muneeba Ali (c, wk); Waheeda Akhtar; Maham Anees; Najiha Alvi (wk); Humna Bilal; Eyman Fatima; Umm-e-Hani; Tuba Hassan; Saira Jabeen; Eman Naseer; Momina Riasat; Tasmia Rubab; Nashra Sandhu; Ayesha Zafar; Shawaal Zulfiqar

== ODI series ==
=== 1st ODI ===
23 July 2026
10:00
Scorecard

Sri Lanka; 210/9 (50 overs)	v	Pakistan; 211/5 (43 overs)
Nilakshi de Silva 46* (50); Nashra Sandhu 3/42 (10 overs)		Gull Feroza 78 (77); Kavisha Dilhari 2/37 (9 overs)

Pakistan won by 5 wickets
Mahinda Rajapaksa International Cricket Stadium, Hambantota
Umpires: Ranmore Martinesz (SL) and Vrinda Rathi (Ind)
Player of the match: Gull Feroza (Pak)

- Sri Lanka won the toss and elected to bat.
- Women's Championship points: Pakistan 2, Sri Lanka 0.

=== 2nd ODI ===
25 July 2026
10:00
Scorecard

Pakistan; 273/5 (50 overs)	v	Sri Lanka; 275/2 (46.5 overs)
Sidra Ameen 100* (120); Chethana Vimukthi 1/26 (6 overs)		Vishmi Gunaratne 123 (123); Fatima Sana 1/44 (8 overs)

Sri Lanka won by 8 wickets
Mahinda Rajapaksa International Cricket Stadium, Hambantota
Umpires: Dedunu Silva (SL) and Vrinda Rathi (Ind)
Player of the match: Vishmi Gunaratne (SL)

- Sri Lanka won the toss and elected to field.
- Rashmika Sewwandi (SL) made her ODI debut.
- Vishmi Gunaratne and Harshitha Samarawickrama recorded the highest-ever partnership for any wicket in WODIs for Sri Lanka (203 runs).
- Women's Championship points: Sri Lanka 2, Pakistan 0.

=== 3rd ODI ===
28 July 2026
10:00
Scorecard

Pakistan; 187 (40 overs)	v	Sri Lanka; 191/2 (37.2 overs)
Fatima Sana 41 (49); Chamari Athapaththu 3/27 (6 overs)		Harshitha Samarawickrama 71* (92); Fatima Sana 1/34 (8 overs)

Sri Lanka won by 8 wickets
Mahinda Rajapaksa International Cricket Stadium, Hambantota
Umpires: Ranmore Martinesz (SL) and Vrinda Rathi (Ind)
Player of the match: Chamari Athapaththu (SL)

- Sri Lanka won the toss and elected to field.
- Women's Championship points: Sri Lanka 2, Pakistan 0.

== T20I series ==
=== 1st T20I ===
31 July 2026
09:30
Scorecard

Pakistan; 176/7 (20 overs)	v	Sri Lanka; 177/4 (19 overs)
Shawaal Zulfiqar 63 (41); Kavisha Dilhari 2/36 (4 overs)		Imesha Dulani 101* (64); Nashra Sandhu 2/25 (4 overs)

Sri Lanka won by 6 wickets
Rangiri Dambulla International Stadium, Dambulla
Umpires: Ranmore Martinesz (SL) and Vrinda Rathi (Ind)
Player of the match: Imesha Dulani (SL)

- Sri Lanka won the toss and elected to field.
- Eman Naseer, Momina Riasat (Pak) and Chamudi Praboda (SL) all made their T20I debuts.
- Imesha Dulani (SL) scored her maiden century in T20Is.

=== 2nd T20I ===
2 August 2026
09:30
Scorecard

Pakistan; 175/5 (20 overs)	v	Sri Lanka; 178/4 (17.4 overs)
Shawaal Zulfiqar 48 (35); Chamudi Praboda 2/27 (4 overs)		Sanjana Kavindi 46 (24); Umm-e-Hani 2/28 (4 overs)

Sri Lanka won by 6 wickets
Rangiri Dambulla International Stadium, Dambulla
Umpires: Vrinda Rathi (Ind) and Dedunu Silva (SL)
Player of the match: Sanjana Kavindi (SL)

- Pakistan won the toss and elected to bat.
- Sanjana Kavindi (SL) made her T20I debut.
- Chamari Athapaththu (SL) scored her 4,000th run in T20Is.

=== 3rd T20I ===
4 August 2026
09:30
Scorecard

Sri Lanka; 113/6 (20 overs)	v	Pakistan; 115/6 (18.2 overs)
Chamari Athapaththu 34 (33); Momina Riasat 2/18 (4 overs)		Ayesha Zafar 39 (31); Chamari Athapaththu 2/20 (4 overs)

Pakistan won by 4 wickets
Rangiri Dambulla International Stadium, Dambulla
Umpires: Nimali Perera (SL) and Vrinda Rathi (Ind)
Player of the match: Ayesha Zafar (Pak)

- Pakistan won the toss and elected to field.
