= Sri Lanka women's cricket team in the West Indies in 2025–26 =

International cricket tour

	West Indies	Sri Lanka
- Dates: 20 February – 3 March 2026
Captains	Hayley Matthews	Chamari Athapaththu

One Day International series
- Results: Sri Lanka won the 3-match series 2–1
Most runs	Stafanie Taylor (131)	Harshitha Samarawickrama (171)
Most wickets	Karishma Ramharack (7)	Inoka Ranaweera (8)
- Player of the series: Harshitha Samarawickrama (SL)

Twenty20 International series
- Results: Sri Lanka won the 3-match series 2–0
Most runs	Hayley Matthews (42); Stafanie Taylor (42)	Chamari Athapaththu (76)
Most wickets	Afy Fletcher (3)	Kavisha Dilhari (5); Malki Madara (5)
- Player of the series: Chamari Athapaththu (SL)

The Sri Lanka women's cricket team toured the West Indies in February and March 2026 to play the West Indies women's cricket team. The tour consisted of three One Day International (ODI) and three Twenty20 International (T20I) matches. The ODI series formed part of the 2025–2029 ICC Women's Championship. All the matches were played at the National Cricket Stadium in Grenada.

== Squads ==
West Indies		Sri Lanka
ODIs	T20Is	ODIs and T20Is
Hayley Matthews (c); Chinelle Henry (vc); Aaliyah Alleyne; Shemaine Campbelle (wk); Jahzara Claxton; Deandra Dottin; Afy Fletcher; Jannillea Glasgow; Realeanna Grimmond; Shawnisha Hector; Qiana Joseph; Ashmini Munisar; Karishma Ramharack; Shunelle Sawh (wk); Stafanie Taylor	Hayley Matthews (c); Chinelle Henry (vc); Aaliyah Alleyne; Eboni Brathwaite; Shemaine Campbelle (wk); Jahzara Claxton; Deandra Dottin; Afy Fletcher; Jannillea Glasgow; Shawnisha Hector; Zaida James; Qiana Joseph; Mandy Mangru; Karishma Ramharack; Stafanie Taylor	Chamari Athapaththu (c); Nilakshi de Silva; Kavisha Dilhari; Imesha Dulani; Vishmi Gunaratne; Kawya Kavindi; Sugandika Kumari; Malki Madara; Nimasha Meepage; Kaushini Nuthyangana (wk); Hasini Perera; Inoka Ranaweera; Harshitha Samarawickrama; Rashmika Sewwandi; Dewmi Vihanga

== ODI series ==
=== 1st ODI ===
20 February 2026
09:30
Scorecard

Sri Lanka; 240/6 (50 overs)	v	West Indies; 230 (49.4 overs)
Harshitha Samarawickrama 66 (105); Hayley Matthews 2/46 (10 overs)		Stafanie Taylor 66 (83); Inoka Ranaweera 4/44 (10 overs)

Sri Lanka won by 10 runs
National Cricket Stadium, St. George's
Umpires: Vrinda Rathi (Ind) and Jacqueline Williams (WI)
Player of the match: Inoka Ranaweera (SL)

- West Indies won the toss and elected to field.
- Nimasha Meepage and Kaushini Nuthyangana (SL) both made their ODI debuts.
- This was the first women's ODI to be played at this venue.
- Hayley Matthews (WI) played in her 100th ODI match.
- Deandra Dottin (WI) played in her 150th ODI match.
- Women's Championship points: Sri Lanka 2, West Indies 0.

=== 2nd ODI ===
22 February 2026
09:30
Scorecard

Sri Lanka; 208 (47.1 overs)	v	West Indies; 194 (48 overs)
Vishmi Gunaratne 58 (66); Karishma Ramharack 3/26 (9.1 overs)		Jannillea Glasgow 50 (69); Sugandika Kumari 3/38 (10 overs)

Sri Lanka won by 14 runs
National Cricket Stadium, St. George's
Umpires: Candace la Borde (WI) and Vrinda Rathi (Ind)
Player of the match: Vishmi Gunaratne (SL)

- West Indies won the toss and elected to field.
- Women's Championship points: Sri Lanka 2, West Indies 0.

=== 3rd ODI ===
25 February 2026
09:30
Scorecard

Sri Lanka; 217/7 (50 overs)	v	West Indies; 218/4 (46 overs)
Harshitha Samarawickrama 70 (112); Hayley Matthews 2/33 (10 overs)		Hayley Matthews 100 (119); Malki Madara 2/33 (6 overs)

West Indies won by 6 wickets
National Cricket Stadium, St. George's
Umpires: Vrinda Rathi (Ind) and Jacqueline Williams (WI)
Player of the match: Hayley Matthews (WI)

- Sri Lanka won the toss and elected to bat.
- Stafanie Taylor (WI) scored her 6,000th run in ODIs.
- Women's Championship points: West Indies 2, Sri Lanka 0.

== T20I series ==
=== 1st T20I ===
28 February 2026
13:00
Scorecard

West Indies; 49 (13.3 overs)	v	Sri Lanka; 7/0 (2.5 overs)
Qiana Joseph 7 (7); Kavisha Dilhari 3/5 (2.3 overs)		Chamari Athapaththu 5* (10)

No result
National Cricket Stadium, St. George's
Umpires: Maria Abbott (WI) and Vrinda Rathi (Ind)

- West Indies won the toss and elected to bat.
- The match was reduced to 18 overs per side due to rain.
- No further play was possible due to rain.
- Afy Fletcher (WI) played in her 100th T20I match.

=== 2nd T20I ===
1 March 2026
13:00
Scorecard

West Indies; 101 (20 overs)	v	Sri Lanka; 102/6 (18.1 overs)
Hayley Matthews 28 (36); Malki Madara 3/16 (4 overs)		Chamari Athapaththu 39 (26); Qiana Joseph 2/13 (2.1 overs)

Sri Lanka won by 4 wickets
National Cricket Stadium, St. George's
Umpires: Candace la Borde (WI) and Vrinda Rathi (Ind)
Player of the match: Chamari Athapaththu (SL)

- Sri Lanka won the toss and elected to field.

=== 3rd T20I ===
3 March 2026
13:00
Scorecard

West Indies; 119/5 (20 overs)	v	Sri Lanka; 121/1 (17.4 overs)
Chinelle Henry 32* (15); Inoka Ranaweera 2/16 (4 overs)		Hasini Perera 52* (59); Afy Fletcher 1/14 (4 overs)

Sri Lanka won by 9 wickets
National Cricket Stadium, St. George's
Umpires: Vrinda Rathi (Ind) and Jacqueline Williams (WI)
Player of the match: Hasini Perera (SL)

- Sri Lanka won the toss and elected to field.
- Eboni Brathwaite (WI) made her T20I debut.
