= Pakistan women's cricket team in South Africa in 2025–26 =

International cricket tour

	South Africa	Pakistan
- Dates: 10 February – 1 March 2026
Captains	Laura Wolvaardt	Fatima Sana

One Day International series
- Results: South Africa won the 3-match series 2–1
Most runs	Annerie Dercksen (175)	Ayesha Zafar (180)
Most wickets	Suné Luus (6)	Sadia Iqbal (6)
- Player of the series: Suné Luus (SA)

Twenty20 International series
- Results: South Africa won the 3-match series 2–1
Most runs	Laura Wolvaardt (112)	Fatima Sana (146)
Most wickets	Ayabonga Khaka (5)	Sadia Iqbal (5)
- Player of the series: Fatima Sana (Pak)

The Pakistan women's cricket team toured South Africa in February and March 2026 to play the South Africa women's cricket team. The tour consisted of three One Day International (ODI) and three Twenty20 International (T20I) matches. The ODI series formed part of the 2025–2029 ICC Women's Championship. In March 2025, the Cricket South Africa (CSA) confirmed the fixtures for the tour, as a part of the 2025 home international season.

On 3 February 2026, the venue for the 3rd WT20I was changed to Willowmoore Park in Benoni.

== Squads ==
South Africa		Pakistan	
ODIs	T20Is	ODIs	T20Is
Laura Wolvaardt (c); Tazmin Brits; Fay Cowling; Nadine de Klerk; Annerie Dercksen; Lara Goodall; Ayanda Hlubi; Sinalo Jafta (wk); ~~Marizanne Kapp~~; Suné Luus; Karabo Meso (wk); Nonkululeko Mlaba; Tumi Sekhukhune; Nondumiso Shangase; Chloe Tryon; Faye Tunnicliffe	Laura Wolvaardt (c); Tazmin Brits; Nadine de Klerk; Annerie Dercksen; Ayanda Hlubi; Sinalo Jafta (wk); Marizanne Kapp; Ayabonga Khaka; Masabata Klaas; Suné Luus; Karabo Meso (wk); Nonkululeko Mlaba; Kayla Reyneke; Chloe Tryon; Dane van Niekerk	Fatima Sana (c); Muneeba Ali (wk); Najiha Alvi (wk); Sidra Ameen; Diana Baig; Gull Feroza; Sadia Iqbal; Natalia Pervaiz; Aliya Riaz; Tasmia Rubab; Syeda Aroob Shah; Sadaf Shamas; ~~Rameen Shamim~~; Nashra Sandhu; Umm-e-Hani; Ayesha Zafar	Fatima Sana (c); Muneeba Ali (wk); Sidra Ameen; Humna Bilal; Eyman Fatima; Gull Feroza (wk); Tuba Hassan; Sadia Iqbal; Saira Jabeen; Natalia Pervaiz; Aliya Riaz; Tasmia Rubab; ~~Rameen Shamim~~; Nashra Sandhu; Umm-e-Hani; Ayesha Zafar

On 3 February 2026, Rameen Shamim was ruled out of Pakistan's squad due to injury, and was replaced by Umm-e-Hani.

On 19 February, Marizanne Kapp was ruled out of the ODI series due to illness, with Fay Cowling was named as her replacement.

== T20I series ==
=== 1st T20I ===
10 February 2026
18:00 (N)
Scorecard

Pakistan; 180/9 (20 overs)	v	South Africa; 185/5 (20 overs)
Fatima Sana 90 (41); Ayanda Hlubi 3/41 (3 overs)		Laura Wolvaardt 61 (38); Nashra Sandhu 2/27 (4 overs)

South Africa won by 5 wickets
JB Marks Oval, Potchefstroom
Umpires: Lauren Agenbag (SA) and Nimali Perera (SL)
Player of the match: Kayla Reyneke (SA)

- Pakistan won the toss and elected to bat.
- Kayla Reyneke (SA) and Humna Bilal (Pak) both made their T20I debuts.

=== 2nd T20I ===
13 February 2026
18:00 (N)
Scorecard

Pakistan; 100/9 (14 overs)	v	South Africa; 104/4 (13.2 overs)
Aliya Riaz 20 (18); Ayabonga Khaka 3/10 (2 overs)		Laura Wolvaardt 40* (29); Sadia Iqbal 2/15 (3 overs)

South Africa won by 6 wickets
Willowmoore Park, Benoni
Umpires: Lauren Agenbag (SA) and Stacy Lackay (SA)
Player of the match: Ayabonga Khaka (SA)

- South Africa won the toss and elected to field.
- The match was reduced to 14 overs per side due to rain.

=== 3rd T20I ===
16 February 2026
18:00 (N)
Scorecard

Pakistan; 144/7 (20 overs)	v	South Africa; 91 (16.5 overs)
Fatima Sana 47* (30); Nonkululeko Mlaba 1/22 (4 overs)		Annerie Dercksen 30 (38); Sadia Iqbal 3/18 (3.5 overs)

Pakistan won by 53 runs
Willowmoore Park, Benoni
Umpires: Kerrin Klaaste (SA) and Nimali Perera (SL)
Player of the match: Fatima Sana (Pak)

- Pakistan won the toss and elected to bat.

== Tour match ==
=== 50-over match ===
19 February 2026
10:00
Scorecard

Pakistan; 307 (48.1 overs)	v	South Africa Emerging; 308/9 (47.4 overs)
Ayesha Zafar 95 (68); Kayla Reyneke 5/41 (9 overs)		Faye Tunnicliffe 109 (88); Umm-e-Hani 3/37 (7 overs)

South Africa Emerging won by 1 wicket
De Beers Diamond Oval, Kimberley
Umpires: Kerrin Klaaste (SA) and Nimali Perera (SL)

- Pakistan won the toss and elected to bat.

== ODI series ==
=== 1st ODI ===
22 February 2026
10:00
Scorecard

South Africa; 260/6 (41 overs)	v	Pakistan; 223 (38.5 overs)
Suné Luus 93* (76); Nashra Sandhu 2/45 (9 overs)		Ayesha Zafar 81 (94); Tumi Sekhukhune 3/50 (7.5 overs)

South Africa won by 37 runs
Mangaung Oval, Bloemfontein
Umpires: Kerrin Klaaste (SA) and Nimali Perera (SL)
Player of the match: Suné Luus (SA)

- Pakistan won the toss and elected to field.
- The match was reduced to 41 overs per side due to rain.
- Women's Championship points: South Africa 2, Pakistan 0.

=== 2nd ODI ===
25 February 2026
14:00 (D/N)
Scorecard

South Africa; 361/8 (50 overs)	v	Pakistan; 345 (49.5 overs)
Annerie Dercksen 90 (68); Syeda Aroob Shah 2/49 (10 overs)		Ayesha Zafar 75 (68); Annerie Dercksen 3/59 (9 overs)

South Africa won by 16 runs
Centurion Park, Centurion
Umpires: Lauren Agenbag (SA) and Kerrin Klaaste (SA)
Player of the match: Annerie Dercksen (SA)

- Pakistan won the toss and elected to field.
- Suné Luus (SA) scored her 3,000th run in ODIs.
- Pakistan's total was their highest score in ODIs.
- Women's Championship points: South Africa 2, Pakistan 0.

=== 3rd ODI ===
1 March 2026
10:00
Scorecard

Pakistan; 306/8 (50 overs)	v	South Africa; 187 (36.2 overs)
Sadaf Shamas 97 (82); Suné Luus 3/42 (9 overs)		Annerie Dercksen 54 (67); Sadia Iqbal 3/41 (10 overs)

Pakistan won by 119 runs
Kingsmead, Durban
Umpires: Lauren Agenbag (SA) and Nimali Perera (SL)
Player of the match: Sadaf Shamas (Pak)

- South Africa won the toss and elected to field.
- Tasmia Rubab (Pak) made her ODI debut.
- Women's Championship points: Pakistan 2, South Africa 0.
