= Sri Lanka women's cricket team in Bangladesh in 2026 =

International cricket tour

	Bangladesh	Sri Lanka
- Dates: 20 April – 2 May 2026
Captains	Nigar Sultana	Chamari Athapaththu (Note: Hasini Perera captained Sri Lanka in the first ODI.)

One Day International series
- Results: Sri Lanka won the 3-match series 2–1
Most runs	Sobhana Mostary (120)	Hasini Perera (127)
Most wickets	Nahida Akter (6)	Nimasha Meepage (5); Malki Madara (5)
- Player of the series: Imesha Dulani (SL)

Twenty20 International series
- Results: Sri Lanka won the 3-match series 3–0
Most runs	Shorna Akter (76)	Chamari Athapaththu (115)
Most wickets	Sultana Khatun (6)	Chamari Athapaththu (4)
- Player of the series: Chamari Athapaththu (SL)

The Sri Lanka women's cricket team toured Bangladesh in April and May 2026 to play three One Day International (ODI) and three Twenty20 International (T20I) matches. The ODI series formed part of the 2025–2029 ICC Women's Championship. The match timings of the T20I series were brought forward to save electricity amid the energy crisis.

Sri Lanka won the ODI series 2–1. T20I series was also won by Sri Lanka, with a 3–0 margin.

== Squads ==
Bangladesh		Sri Lanka	
ODIs	T20Is	ODIs	T20Is
Nigar Sultana (c, wk); Sharmin Akhter; Marufa Akter; Nahida Akter; Shorna Akter; Juairiya Ferdous (wk); Fargana Hoque; Rabeya Khan; Fahima Khatun; Sultana Khatun; Sanjida Akter Meghla; Ritu Moni; Sobhana Mostary; Sharmin Sultana; Fariha Trisna	Nigar Sultana (c, wk); Nahida Akter (vc); Sharmin Akhter; Dilara Akter (wk); Marufa Akter; Shorna Akter; Juairiya Ferdous (wk); Rabeya Khan; Fahima Khatun; Sultana Khatun; Sanjida Akter Meghla; Ritu Moni; Sobhana Mostary; Sharmin Sultana; Fariha Trisna	Chamari Athapaththu (c); Nilakshi de Silva; Kavisha Dilhari; Imesha Dulani; Hansima Karunaratne; Kawya Kavindi; Sugandika Kumari; Malki Madara; Nimasha Meepage; Kaushini Nuthyangana (wk); Hasini Perera; Inoka Ranaweera; Harshitha Samarawickrama; Dewmi Vihanga; Chethana Vimukthi; Piumi Wathsala	Chamari Athapaththu (c); Mithali Ayodhya; Nilakshi de Silva; Kavisha Dilhari; Imesha Dulani; Hansima Karunaratne; Sugandika Kumari; Malki Madara; Nimasha Meepage; Kaushini Nuthyangana (wk); Hasini Perera; Inoka Ranaweera; Harshitha Samarawickrama; Rashmika Sewwandi; Dewmi Vihanga

== ODI series ==
=== 1st ODI ===
20 April 2026
09:30
Scorecard

Sri Lanka; 205/9 (50 overs)	v	Bangladesh; 206/7 (48.3 overs)
Hansima Karunaratne 54 (71); Ritu Moni 3/36 (9 overs)		Sharmin Akhter 86 (127); Dewmi Vihanga 3/43 (10 overs)

Bangladesh won by 3 wickets
Shahid Kamruzzaman Stadium, Rajshahi
Umpires: Dolly Rani (Ban) and Eloise Sheridan (Aus)
Player of the match: Sharmin Akhter (Ban)

- Sri Lanka won the toss and elected to bat
- Juairiya Ferdous (Ban) made her ODI debut.
- Women's Championship points: Bangladesh 2, Sri Lanka 0.

=== 2nd ODI ===
22 April 2026
09:30
Scorecard

Bangladesh; 165 (45.5 overs)	v	Sri Lanka; 166/6 (38.2 overs)
Nigar Sultana 58 (101); Chamari Athapaththu 3/36 (8 overs)		Harshitha Samarawickrama 50 (76); Nahida Akter 4/21 (7.2 overs)

Sri Lanka won by 4 wickets
Shahid Kamruzzaman Stadium, Rajshahi
Umpires: Eloise Sheridan (Aus) and Rokeya Sultana (Ban)
Player of the match: Chamari Athapaththu (SL)

- Bangladesh won the toss and elected to bat.
- Women's Championship points: Sri Lanka 2, Bangladesh 0.

=== 3rd ODI ===
25 April 2026
09:30
Scorecard

Bangladesh; 213/8 (50 overs)	v	Sri Lanka; 214/3 (46.3 overs)
Sobhana Mostary 74 (80); Kavisha Dilhari 3/48 (10 overs)		Hasini Perera 95 (131); Marufa Akter 2/49 (10 overs)

Sri Lanka won by 7 wickets
Shahid Kamruzzaman Stadium, Rajshahi
Umpires: Shathira Jakir (Ban) and Eloise Sheridan (Aus)
Player of the match: Hasini Perera (SL)

- Bangladesh won the toss and elected to bat.
- Women's Championship points: Sri Lanka 2, Bangladesh 0.

== T20I series ==
=== 1st T20I ===
28 April 2026
13:30
Scorecard

Sri Lanka; 161/4 (20 overs)	v	Bangladesh; 136/7 (20 overs)
Harshitha Samarawickrama 61 (35); Sultana Khatun 2/29 (4 overs)		Shorna Akter 60 (45); Chamari Athapaththu 2/19 (4 overs)

Sri Lanka won by 25 runs
Sylhet International Cricket Stadium, Sylhet
Umpires: Champa Chakma (Ban) and Eloise Sheridan (Aus)
Player of the match: Harshitha Samarawickrama (SL)

- Bangladesh won the toss and elected to field.
- Mithali Ayodhya (SL) made her T20I debut.

=== 2nd T20I ===
30 April 2026
13:30
Scorecard

Sri Lanka; 154/4 (20 overs)	v	Bangladesh; 133/5 (20 overs)
Harshitha Samarawickrama 49 (29); Sultana Khatun 1/21 (4 overs)		Sharmin Akhter 45* (47); Kavisha Dilhari 2/15 (4 overs)

Sri Lanka won by 21 runs
Sylhet International Cricket Stadium, Sylhet
Umpires: Eloise Sheridan (Aus) and Rokeya Sultana (Ban)
Player of the match: Kavisha Dilhari (SL)

- Bangladesh won the toss and elected to field.

=== 3rd T20I ===
2 May 2026
13:30
Scorecard

Sri Lanka; 87/6 (9 overs)	v	Bangladesh; 84/6 (9 overs)
Chamari Athapaththu 41 (27); Sultana Khatun 3/8 (2 overs)		Sobhana Mostary 21 (15); Chamari Athapaththu 2/15 (2 overs)

Sri Lanka won by 3 runs
Sylhet International Cricket Stadium, Sylhet
Umpires: Shathira Jakir (Ban) and Eloise Sheridan (Aus)
Player of the match: Chamari Athapaththu (SL)

- Bangladesh won the toss and elected to field.
- The match was reduced to 9 overs per side due to rain.
