= Zimbabwe women's cricket team in Pakistan in 2026 =

International cricket tour

	Pakistan	Zimbabwe
- Dates: 4 May – 15 May 2026
Captains	Fatima Sana	Nomvelo Sibanda

One Day International series
- Results: Pakistan won the 3-match series 3–0
Most runs	Sadaf Shamas (289)	Beloved Biza (155)
Most wickets	Syeda Aroob Shah (6)	Precious Marange (3)
- Player of the series: Gull Feroza (Pak)

Twenty20 International series
- Results: Pakistan won the 3-match series 3–0
Most runs	Ayesha Zafar (151)	Adel Zimunu (48)
Most wickets	Sadia Iqbal (6)	Lindokuhle Mabhero (3); Michelle Mavunga (3)
- Player of the series: Ayesha Zafar (Pak)

The Zimbabwe women's cricket team toured Pakistan in May 2026 to play three ODI and three Twenty20 Internationals (T20I). The ODI series formed part of the 2025–2029 ICC Women's Championship. This was Zimbabwe women's first ever tour of Pakistan. The T20I series served as preparation for Pakistan ahead of the 2026 Women's T20 World Cup.

== Squads ==
Pakistan		Zimbabwe
ODIs	T20Is	ODIs & T20Is
Fatima Sana (c); Muneeba Ali (wk); Najiha Alvi (wk); Sidra Amin; Diana Baig; Gull Feroza; Natalia Parvaiz; Momina Riasat; Aliya Riaz; Tasmia Rubab; Nashra Sandhu; Syeda Aroob Shah; Sadaf Shamas; Rameen Shamim; Ayesha Zafar	Fatima Sana (c); Muneeba Ali (wk); Eyman Fatima; Gull Feroza; Tuba Hassan; Sadia Iqbal; Saira Jabeen; Iram Javed; Amber Kainat; Natalia Parvaiz; Aliya Riaz; Tasmia Rubab; Nashra Sandhu; Rameen Shamim; Ayesha Zafar	Nomvelo Sibanda (c); Beloved Biza; Olinder Chare; Kudzai Chigora; Melinda Kachingwe; Lindokuhle Mabhero; Precious Marange; Michelle Mavunga; Natasha Mtomba; Christine Mutasa; Vimbai Mutungwindu; Kelis Ndhlovu; Kelly Ndiraya; Runyararo Pasipanodya; Adel Zimunu

== WODI series ==
=== 1st ODI ===
4 May 2026
09:00
Scorecard

Pakistan; 330/5 (50 overs)	v	Zimbabwe; 162 (36.4 overs)
Sadaf Shamas 98 (130); Precious Marange 3/39 (10 overs)		Beloved Biza 53 (53); Tasmia Rubab 2/21 (7.4 overs)

Pakistan won by 168 runs
National Stadium, Karachi
Umpires: Zulfiqar Jan (Pak) and Nimali Perera (SL)
Player of the match: Sadaf Shamas (Pak)

- Zimbabwe won the toss and elected to field.
- Momina Riasat (Pak), Melinda Kanchingwe, Christine Mutasa and Kelly Ndiraya (Zim) all made their ODI debuts.
- Women's Championship points: Pakistan 2, Zimbabwe 0.

=== 2nd ODI ===
6 May 2026
09:00
Scorecard

Pakistan; 343/4 (50 overs)	v	Zimbabwe; 137 (39 overs)
Sadaf Shamas 101 (112); Christine Mutasa 1/19 (2 overs)		Runyararo Pasipanodya 33* (62); Fatima Sana 3/15 (6 overs)

Pakistan won by 206 runs
National Stadium, Karachi
Umpires: Nimali Perera (SL) and Tariq Rasheed (Pak)
Player of the match: Gull Feroza (Pak)

- Pakistan won the toss and elected to bat.
- Vimbai Mutungwindu (Zim) made her ODI debut.
- Sadaf Shamas and Gull Feroza (Pak) both scored their maiden centuries in ODIs.
- Women's Championship points: Pakistan 2, Zimbabwe 0.

=== 3rd ODI ===
9 May 2026
09:00
Scorecard

Pakistan; 229/9 (50 overs)	v	Zimbabwe; 225/1 (31.5 overs)
Beloved Biza 73 (88); Tasmia Rubab 3/49 (10 overs)		Gull Feroza 106* (92); Kudzai Chigora 1/39 (4.5 overs)

Pakistan won by 9 wickets
National Stadium, Karachi
Umpires: Saleema Imtiaz (Pak) and Nimali Perera (SL)
Player of the match: Gull Feroza (Pak)

- Zimbabwe won the toss and elected to bat.
- Women's Championship points: Pakistan 2, Zimbabwe 0.

== WT20I series ==
=== 1st T20I ===
12 May 2026
19:30
Scorecard

Pakistan; 237/5 (20 overs)	v	Zimbabwe; 84 (18.2 overs)
Ayesha Zafar 102* (47); Nomvelo Sibanda 2/59 (4 overs)		Natasha Mtomba 24 (20); Fatima Sana 3/7 (3 overs)

Pakistan won by 153 runs
National Stadium, Karachi
Umpires: Abdul Muqeet (Pak) and Nimali Perera (SL)
Player of the match: Ayesha Zafar (Pak)

- Pakistan won the toss and elected to bat.
- Amber Kainat, Saira Jabeen (Pak), Vimbai Mutungwindu and Kelly Ndiraya (Zim) all made their T20I debuts.
- Ayesha Zafar (Pak) scored her maiden century in T20Is.

=== 2nd T20I ===
14 May 2026
19:30
Scorecard

Pakistan; 170/4 (20 overs)	v	Zimbabwe; 103/8 (20 overs)
Eyman Fatima 79* (43); Lindokuhle Mabhero 1/20 (3 overs)		Nomvelo Sibanda 18* (37); Nashra Sandhu 2/18 (3 overs)

Pakistan won by 67 runs
National Stadium, Karachi
Umpires: Nasir Hussain (Pak) and Nimali Perera (SL)
Player of the match: Eyman Fatima (Pak)

- Pakistan won the toss and elected to bat.

=== 3rd T20I ===
15 May 2026
19:30
Scorecard

Pakistan; 223/4 (20 overs)	v	Zimbabwe; 90 (17.1 overs)
Fatima Sana 62* (19); Lindokuhle Mabhero 2/36 (4 overs)		Kelis Ndhlovu 32 (13); Sadia Iqbal 3/20 (3 overs)

Pakistan won by 133 runs
National Stadium, Karachi
Umpires: Saleema Imtiaz (Pak) and Nimali Perera (SL)
Player of the match: Fatima Sana (Pak)

- Pakistan won the toss and elected to bat.
- Olinder Chare (Zim) made her T20I debut.
