= South Africa women's cricket team in Pakistan in 2024–25 =

International cricket tour

	Pakistan	South Africa
- Dates: 16 – 20 September 2024
Captains	Fatima Sana	Laura Wolvaardt

Twenty20 International series
- Results: South Africa won the 3-match series 2–1
Most runs	Fatima Sana (101)	Suné Luus (94)
Most wickets	Sadia Iqbal (6)	Tumi Sekhukhune (5)
- Player of the series: Suné Luus (SA)

The South Africa women's cricket team toured Pakistan in September 2024 to play three Twenty20 International (T20I) matches against Pakistan women's cricket team. In August 2024, the Pakistan Cricket Board (PCB) confirmed the fixtures for the tour. The series formed part of both teams' preparation ahead of the 2024 ICC Women's T20 World Cup tournament.

South Africa won the first T20I by 10 runs. The hosts won the second T20I by 13 runs. The tourists won the third T20I by 8 wickets and won the series 2–1.

== Squads ==
Pakistan	South Africa
Fatima Sana (c); Muneeba Ali (wk); Sidra Ameen; Diana Baig; Nida Dar; Gull Feroza (wk); Tuba Hassan; Sadia Iqbal; Iram Javed; Aliya Riaz; Tasmia Rubab; Nashra Sandhu; Syeda Aroob Shah; Sadaf Shamas; Omaima Sohail	Laura Wolvaardt (c); Anneke Bosch; Tazmin Brits; Nadine de Klerk; Annerie Dercksen; Mieke de Ridder (wk); Ayanda Hlubi; Sinalo Jafta (wk); Marizanne Kapp; Ayabonga Khaka; Suné Luus; Nonkululeko Mlaba; Seshnie Naidu; Tumi Sekhukhune; Chloe Tryon

== T20I series ==
=== 1st T20I ===
16 September 2024
19:00 (N)
Scorecard

South Africa; 132/4 (20 overs)	v	Pakistan; 122/5 (20 overs)
Tazmin Brits 56* (63); Sadia Iqbal 3/27 (4 overs)		Aliya Riaz 52* (39); Marizanne Kapp 2/22 (4 overs)

South Africa won by 10 runs
Multan Cricket Stadium, Multan
Umpires: Faisal Afridi (Pak) and Saleema Imtiaz (Pak)
Player of the match: Tazmin Brits (SA)

- Pakistan won the toss and elected to field.
- Seshnie Naidu (SA) made her T20I debut.
- This was the first women's T20I match to be played at this venue.

=== 2nd T20I ===
18 September 2024
19:00 (N)
Scorecard

Pakistan; 181/4 (20 overs)	v	South Africa; 168/4 (20 overs)
Muneeba Ali 45 (34); Tumi Sekhukhune 2/30 (3 overs)		Sune Luus 53* (29); Nashra Sandhu 2/20 (4 overs)

Pakistan won by 13 runs
Multan Cricket Stadium, Multan
Umpires: Faisal Afridi (Pak) and Saleema Imtiaz (Pak)
Player of the match: Muneeba Ali (Pak)

- South Africa won the toss and elected to field.
- Tasmia Rubab made her T20I debut after replacing Fatima Sana as a concussion substitute for Pakistan during the second innings.
- Suné Luus (SA) took her 50th wicket in women's T20Is.
- Nida Dar (Pak) scored her 2,000th run in women's T20Is.
- Pakistan recorded their highest team total in women's T20Is.

=== 3rd T20I ===
20 September 2024
10:00
Scorecard

Pakistan; 153/5 (20 overs)	v	South Africa; 154/2 (18.3 overs)
Sidra Ameen 37 (40); Suné Luus 1/18 (4 overs)		Anneke Bosch 46* (37); Tuba Hassan 1/26 (4 overs)

South Africa won by 8 wickets
Multan Cricket Stadium, Multan
Umpires: Faisal Afridi (Pak) and Saleema Imtiaz (Pak)
Player of the match: Annerie Dercksen (SA)

- South Africa won the toss and elected to field.
