= West Indies women's cricket team in Zimbabwe in 2026–27 =

International cricket tour

	Zimbabwe	West Indies
- Dates: 24 September – 7 October 2026
Captains	Josephine Nkomo (Note: Nomvelo Sibanda captained West Indies in the 3rd T20I.)	Hayley Matthews (ODIs); Chinelle Henry (T20Is)

One Day International series
- Results: West Indies won the 3-match series 2–1
Most runs	Modester Mupachikwa (128)	Hayley Matthews (326)
Most wickets	Nyasha Gwanzura (6)	Aaliyah Alleyne (7)
- Player of the series: Hayley Matthews (WI)

Twenty20 International series
- Results: West Indies won the 3-match series 3–0
Most runs	Kelis Ndhlovu (99)	Eboni Brathwaite (80)
Most wickets	Beloved Biza (2); Christina Mutasa (2)	Jahzara Claxton (7)
- Player of the series: Jahzara Claxton (WI)

The West Indies women's cricket team toured Zimbabwe in September 2026 to play against the Zimbabwe women's cricket team. The tour consisted of three One Day International (ODI) and three Twenty20 International (T20I) matches. The ODI series formed part of the 2025–2029 ICC Women's Championship. In September 2026, Zimbabwe Cricket (ZC) confirmed the fixtures for the tour.

== Squads ==
Zimbabwe		West Indies	
ODIs	T20Is	ODIs	T20Is
Josephine Nkomo (c); Beloved Biza; Olinder Chare; Kudzai Chigora; Chiedza Dhururu (wk); Nyasha Gwanzura; Tendai Makusha; Michelle Mavunga; Sharne Mayers; Chipo Mugeri-Tiripano; Modester Mupachikwa (wk); Christina Mutasa; Kelis Ndhlovu; Loryn Phiri; Nomvelo Sibanda	Josephine Nkomo (c); Beloved Biza; Olinder Chare; Francisca Chipare; Chiedza Dhururu (wk); Nyasha Gwanzura; Tendai Makusha; Michelle Mavunga; Sharne Mayers; Chipo Mugeri-Tiripano; Modester Mupachikwa (wk); Christina Mutasa; Kelis Ndhlovu; Loryn Phiri; Nomvelo Sibanda	Hayley Matthews (c); Aaliyah Alleyne; Eboni Brathwaite; Shemaine Campbelle (wk); Jahzara Claxton; Afy Fletcher; Jannillea Glasgow; Realeanna Grimmond; Shawnisha Hector; Chinelle Henry; Zaida James; Mandy Mangru (wk); Ashmini Munisar; Karishma Ramharack; Stafanie Taylor	Chinelle Henry (c); Aaliyah Alleyne; Eboni Brathwaite; Shemaine Campbelle (wk); Jahzara Claxton; Afy Fletcher; Jannillea Glasgow; Realeanna Grimmond; Shawnisha Hector; Zaida James; Mandy Mangru (wk); Ashmini Munisar; Karishma Ramharack; Stafanie Taylor

== ODI series ==
=== 1st ODI ===
24 September 2026
09:30
Scorecard

West Indies; 299/6 (50 overs)	v	Zimbabwe; 200 (43.3 overs)
Hayley Matthews 182 (156); Francisca Chipare 2/57 (10 overs)		Modester Mupachikwa 86 (106); Aaliyah Alleyne 3/44 (6.3 overs)

West Indies won by 99 runs
Harare Sports Club, Harare
Umpires: Kim Cotton (NZ) and Percival Sizara (Zim)
Player of the match: Hayley Matthews (WI)

- West Indies won the toss and elected to bat.
- Women's Championship points: West Indies 2, Zimbabwe 0.

=== 2nd ODI ===
27 September 2026
09:30
Scorecard

West Indies; 139 (39.3 overs)	v	Zimbabwe; 140/6 (40.5 overs)
Stafanie Taylor 47 (68); Nyasha Gwanzura 4/33 (10 overs)		Modester Mupachikwa 38 (57); Ashmini Munisar 2/15 (7 overs)

Zimbabwe won by 4 wickets
Harare Sports Club, Harare
Umpires: Kim Cotton (NZ) and Oscar Tafirenyika (Zim)
Player of the match: Nyasha Gwanzura (Zim)

- West Indies won the toss and elected to bat.
- Women's Championship points: Zimbabwe 2, West Indies 0.

=== 3rd ODI ===
30 September 2026
09:30
Scorecard

West Indies; 271/5 (50 overs)	v	Zimbabwe; 180 (47.3 overs)
Hayley Matthews 118 (113); Nomvelo Sibanda 2/42 (7 overs)		Josephine Nkomo 74* (109); Ashmini Munisar 2/32 (10 overs)

West Indies won by 91 runs
Harare Sports Club, Harare
Umpires: Kim Cotton (NZ) and Langton Rusere (Zim)
Player of the match: Hayley Matthews (WI)

- Zimbabwe won the toss and elected to field.
- Women's Championship points: West Indies 2, Zimbabwe 0.

== T20I series ==
=== 1st T20I ===
3 October 2026
13:00
Scorecard

Zimbabwe; 97/9 (20 overs)	v	West Indies; 98/2 (12.5 overs)
Beloved Biza 21 (24); Karishma Ramharack 3/17 (4 overs)		Realeanna Grimmond 34 (25); Beloved Biza 1/10 (1.5 overs)

West Indies won by 8 wickets
Takashinga Cricket Club, Harare
Umpires: Kim Cotton (NZ) and Forster Mutizwa (Zim)
Player of the match: Jahzara Claxton (WI)

- West Indies won the toss and elected to field.

=== 2nd T20I ===
5 October 2026
12:00
Scorecard

Zimbabwe; 106/7 (20 overs)	v	West Indies; 108/2 (9.1 overs)
Beloved Biza 35 (35); Jahzara Claxton 3/14 (2 overs)		Eboni Brathwaite 57 (23); Christine Mutasa 1/15 (1.1 overs)

West Indies won by 8 wickets
Takashinga Cricket Club, Harare
Umpires: Kim Cotton (NZ) and Oscar Tafirenyika (Zim)
Player of the match: Eboni Brathwaite (WI)

- West Indies won the toss and elected to field.

=== 3rd T20I ===
7 October 2026
12:00
Scorecard

Zimbabwe; 142/6 (20 overs)	v	West Indies; 143/2 (17 overs)
Kelis Ndhlovu 63 (48); Stafanie Taylor 2/8 (4 overs)		Stafanie Taylor 64* (39); Christine Mutasa 1/19 (3 overs)

West Indies won by 8 wickets
Takashinga Cricket Club, Harare
Umpires: Iknow Chabi (Zim) and Kim Cotton (NZ)
Player of the match: Stafanie Taylor (WI)

- Zimbabwe won the toss and elected to bat.
