= West Indies women's cricket team in Ireland in 2026 =

International cricket tour

	Ireland	West Indies
- Dates: 10 – 15 July 2026
Captains	Gaby Lewis	Hayley Matthews

One Day International series
- Results: West Indies won the 3-match series 3–0
Most runs	Amy Hunter (193)	Hayley Matthews (265)
Most wickets	Aimee Maguire (3); Orla Prendergast (3)	Afy Fletcher (8)
- Player of the series: Hayley Matthews (WI)

The West Indies women's cricket team toured Ireland in July 2026 to play the Ireland women's cricket team. The tour consisted of three One Day International (ODI) matches. The series formed part of the 2025–2029 ICC Women's Championship. In March 2026, the Cricket Ireland (CI) confirmed the fixtures for the tour, as a part of the 2026 home international season.

== Squads ==
Ireland	West Indies
ODIs	ODIs
Gaby Lewis (c); Orla Prendergast (vc); Christina Coulter Reilly; Alana Dalzell; Sarah Forbes; Amy Hunter (wk); Arlene Kelly; Louise Little; Aimee Maguire; Jane Maguire; Kia McCartney; Cara Murray; Leah Paul; Rebecca Stokell	Hayley Matthews (c); Aaliyah Alleyne; Shemaine Campbelle (wk); Jahzara Claxton; Deandra Dottin; Afy Fletcher; Jannillea Glasgow; Realeanna Grimmond; Shawnisha Hector; Zaida James; Qiana Joseph; Mandy Mangru; Ashmini Munisar; Karishma Ramharack; Stafanie Taylor

== ODI series ==
=== 1st ODI ===
10 July 2026
10:45
Scorecard

Ireland; 269 (49 overs)	v	West Indies; 270/1 (38.4 overs)
Amy Hunter 96 (90); Afy Fletcher 4/49 (10 overs)		Hayley Matthews 159* (123); Louise Little 1/25 (5 overs)

West Indies won by 9 wickets
Bready Cricket Club Ground, Magheramason
Umpires: Roland Black (Ire) and Claire Polosak (Aus)
Player of the match: Hayley Matthews (WI)

- West Indies won the toss and elected to field.
- Women's Championship points: West Indies 2, Ireland 0.

=== 2nd ODI ===
12 July 2026
10:45
Scorecard

Ireland; 241/7 (50 overs)	v	West Indies; 242/4 (38.5 overs)
Amy Hunter 67 (87); Deandra Dottin 2/15 (5 overs)		Hayley Matthews 100 (94); Aimee Maguire 2/52 (8 overs)

West Indies won by 6 wickets
Bready Cricket Club Ground, Magheramason
Umpires: Gareth Morrison (Ire) and Claire Polosak (Aus)
Player of the match: Hayley Matthews (WI)

- West Indies won the toss and elected to field.
- Women's Championship points: West Indies 2, Ireland 0.

=== 3rd ODI ===
15 July 2026
10:45
Scorecard

West Indies; 257 (50 overs)	v	Ireland; 193 (43.1 overs)
Stafanie Taylor 105 (113); Orla Prendergast 2/37 (10 overs)		Gaby Lewis 50 (59); Karishma Ramharack 3/33 (6.1 overs)

West Indies won by 64 runs
Bready Cricket Club Ground, Magheramason
Umpires: Roland Black (Ire) and Claire Polosak (Aus)
Player of the match: Stafanie Taylor (WI)

- Ireland won the toss and elected to field.
- Women's Championship points: West Indies 2, Ireland 0.
