= Australia women's cricket team in the West Indies in 2025–26 =

International cricket tour

	West Indies	Australia
- Dates: 19 March – 2 April 2026
Captains	Hayley Matthews	Sophie Molineux (Note: Tahlia McGrath captained Australia in the 2nd and 3rd ODIs.)

One Day International series
- Results: Australia won the 3-match series 3–0
Most runs	Stafanie Taylor (128)	Phoebe Litchfield (191)
Most wickets	Afy Fletcher (5)	Ashleigh Gardner (7)
- Player of the series: Phoebe Litchfield (Aus)

Twenty20 International series
- Results: Australia won the 3-match series 3–0
Most runs	Hayley Matthews (97)	Georgia Voll (148)
Most wickets	Deandra Dottin (5)	Alana King (5)
- Player of the series: Alana King (Aus)

The Australia women's cricket team toured the West Indies in March and April 2026 to play the West Indies women's cricket team. The tour consisted of three One Day International (ODI) and three Twenty20 International (T20I) matches. The ODI series formed part of the 2025–2029 ICC Women's Championship. In February 2026, the Cricket West Indies (CWI) confirmed the fixtures for the tour.

The tour was expected to include the West Indies return to Test cricket for the first time in 22 years, before CWI removed the match from the schedule in order to prioritise 2026 Women's T20 World Cup.

== Squads ==
West Indies		Australia
ODIs	T20Is	ODIs and T20Is
Hayley Matthews (c); Chinelle Henry (vc); Aaliyah Alleyne; Shemaine Campbelle (wk); Jahzara Claxton; Deandra Dottin; Afy Fletcher; Jannillea Glasgow; Realeanna Grimmond; Shawnisha Hector; Qiana Joseph; Ashmini Munisar; Karishma Ramharack; Shunelle Sawh; Stafanie Taylor	Hayley Matthews (c); Chinelle Henry (vc); Aaliyah Alleyne; Eboni Brathwaite; Shemaine Campbelle (wk); Jahzara Claxton; Deandra Dottin; Afy Fletcher; Jannillea Glasgow; Shawnisha Hector; Zaida James; Qiana Joseph; Mandy Mangru; Karishma Ramharack; Stafanie Taylor	Sophie Molineux (c); Ashleigh Gardner (vc); Tahlia McGrath (vc); Darcie Brown; Nicola Carey; Kim Garth; Lucy Hamilton; Alana King; Phoebe Litchfield; Beth Mooney (wk); Ellyse Perry; Megan Schutt; Georgia Voll; Georgia Wareham; Tahlia Wilson

== T20I series ==
=== 1st T20I ===
19 March 2026
18:30 (N)
Scorecard

Australia; 164/6 (20 overs)	v	West Indies; 121/6 (20 overs)
Beth Mooney 79 (55); Deandra Dottin 3/35 (4 overs)		Qiana Joseph 45 (39); Alana King 3/14 (4 overs)

Australia won by 43 runs
Arnos Vale Stadium, Arnos Vale
Umpires: Lauren Agenbag (SA) and Jacqueline Williams (WI)
Player of the match: Beth Mooney (Aus)

- Australia won the toss and elected to bat.

=== 2nd T20I ===
21 March 2026
18:30 (N)
Scorecard

Australia; 164/5 (20 overs)	v	West Indies; 147/4 (20 overs)
Ellyse Perry 42 (28); Karishma Ramharack 1/21 (2 overs)		Hayley Matthews 56 (41); Alana King 2/25 (4 overs)

Australia won by 17 runs
Arnos Vale Stadium, Arnos Vale
Umpires: Maria Abbott (WI) and Lauren Agenbag (SA)
Player of the match: Alana King (Aus)

- Australia won the toss and elected to bat.

=== 3rd T20I ===
23 March 2026
18:30 (N)
Scorecard

Australia; 211/7 (20 overs)	v	West Indies; 63/3 (10 overs)
Georgia Voll 101 (53); Hayley Matthews 3/29 (4 overs)		Hayley Matthews 30* (23); Ellyse Perry 1/0 (1 over)

Australia won by 40 runs (DLS method)
Arnos Vale Stadium, Arnos Vale
Umpires: Lauren Agenbag (SA) and Candace la Borde (WI)
Player of the match: Georgia Voll (Aus)

- West Indies won the toss and elected to field.
- Rain prevented any further play.
- West Indies were 40 runs behind in the DLS par score when rain stopped the play.
- Lucy Hamilton (Aus) made her T20I debut.
- Georgia Voll (Aus) scored her maiden century in T20Is.

== ODI series ==
=== 1st ODI ===
27 March 2026
14:00 (D/N)
Scorecard

Australia; 341 (49.5 overs)	v	West Indies; 238/8 (50 overs)
Phoebe Litchfield 77 (72); Afy Fletcher 3/83 (10 overs)		Stafanie Taylor 105* (129); Kim Garth 3/37 (10 overs)

Australia won by 103 runs
Warner Park Sporting Complex, Basseterre
Umpires: Lauren Agenbag (SA) and Candace la Borde (WI)
Player of the match: Georgia Wareham (Aus)

- Australia won the toss and elected to bat.
- Tahlia Wilson (Aus) made her ODI debut.
- Women's Championship points: Australia 2, West Indies 0.

=== 2nd ODI ===
29 March 2026
14:00 (D/N)
Scorecard

Australia; 269/7 (50 overs)	v	West Indies; 179 (46 overs)
Beth Mooney 65 (104); Hayley Matthews 3/40 (10 overs)		Hayley Matthews 45 (73); Georgia Wareham 3/29 (10 overs)

Australia won by 90 runs
Warner Park Sporting Complex, Basseterre
Umpires: Lauren Agenbag (SA) and Jacqueline Williams (WI)
Player of the match: Georgia Wareham (Aus)

- Australia won the toss and elected to bat.
- Women's Championship points: Australia 2, West Indies 0.

=== 3rd ODI ===
2 April 2026
14:00 (D/N)
Scorecard

West Indies; 136 (35.4 overs)	v	Australia; 137/1 (19.4 overs)
Chinelle Henry 42* (54); Alana King 5/19 (10 overs)		Phoebe Litchfield 68* (56); Ashmini Munisar 1/35 (6 overs)

Australia won by 9 wickets
Warner Park Sporting Complex, Basseterre
Umpires: Maria Abbott (WI) and Lauren Agenbag (SA)
Player of the match: Alana King (Aus)

- West Indies won the toss and elected to bat.
- Shunelle Sawh (WI) made her ODI debut.
- Women's Championship points: Australia 2, West Indies 0.
