= 2025–2029 ICC Women's Championship =

Cricket tournament

- Dates: 20 February 2026 – April 2029
- Administrator: International Cricket Council
- Cricket format: One Day International
- Tournament format: Round-robin
- Host: Various

The 2025–2029 ICC Women's Championship is the fourth edition of the ICC Women's Championship, a One Day International (ODI) cricket competition that is being contested by eleven teams, to determine qualification for the 2029 Women's Cricket World Cup. Each team will play a total of eight three-match series, with four of them played at home, and four played away.

In November 2024, the International Cricket Council (ICC) announced that they were expanding the Women's Championship from ten teams to eleven teams, therefore including Zimbabwe in future editions of the competition.

== Teams ==
The following teams will participate in the Women's Championship:

- Australia
- Bangladesh
- England
- India
- Ireland
- New Zealand
- Pakistan
- South Africa
- Sri Lanka
- West Indies
- Zimbabwe

== Schedule ==
The ICC announced the following home and away schedule for each team:

Home \ Away	(Australia)	(Bangladesh)	(England)	(India)	(Ireland)	(New Zealand)	(Pakistan)	(South Africa)	(Sri Lanka)	(Cricket West Indies)	(Zimbabwe)
Australia		3–0		—		Mar '27	—	—	—	—	—
Bangladesh	—		—	—	—	—	—		1–2		
England	—	Sep '27		—	3–0	1–1	—		—	—	—
India					—	—	—	—	—	—	3–0
Ireland	—	—	—					—	—	0–3	—
New Zealand	—	—	—		—		—	2–1		—	3–0
Pakistan	—			—	—	Apr '27		—	—	—	3–0
South Africa	Apr '27	—	—	Dec '26	—	—	2–1		—		—
Sri Lanka	Dec '26	—	Mar '27	—		—	2–1	—		—	—
West Indies	0–3	—	—		—	—		—	1–2		—
Zimbabwe	—	—	—	—		—	—			1–2	

Updated to match(es) played on 28 October 2026. Source: ESPNcricinfo
Legend: Blue = home team win; Yellow = draw; Red = away team win.

Team	Scheduled matches		Not scheduled to play against
Team	Home	Away	Not scheduled to play against
Australia	Bangladesh; England; Ireland; New Zealand	India; South Africa; Sri Lanka; West Indies	Pakistan; Zimbabwe
Bangladesh	South Africa; Sri Lanka; West Indies; Zimbabwe	Australia; England; India; Pakistan	Ireland; New Zealand
England	Bangladesh; Ireland; New Zealand; South Africa	Australia; India; Pakistan; Sri Lanka	West Indies; Zimbabwe
India	Australia; Bangladesh; England; Zimbabwe	Ireland; New Zealand; South Africa; West Indies	Pakistan; Sri Lanka
Ireland	India; New Zealand; Pakistan; West Indies	Australia; England; Sri Lanka; Zimbabwe	Bangladesh; South Africa
New Zealand	India; South Africa; Sri Lanka; Zimbabwe	Australia; England; Ireland; Pakistan	Bangladesh; West Indies
Pakistan	Bangladesh; England; New Zealand; Zimbabwe	Ireland; South Africa; Sri Lanka; West Indies	Australia; India
South Africa	Australia; India; Pakistan; West Indies	Bangladesh; England; New Zealand; Zimbabwe	Ireland; Sri Lanka
Sri Lanka	Australia; England; Ireland; Pakistan	Bangladesh; New Zealand; West Indies; Zimbabwe	India; South Africa
West Indies	Australia; India; Pakistan; Sri Lanka	Bangladesh; Ireland; South Africa; Zimbabwe	England; New Zealand
Zimbabwe	Ireland; South Africa; Sri Lanka; West Indies	Bangladesh; India; New Zealand; Pakistan	Australia; England

== Points table ==
Pos	Team	Pld	W	L	T	NR	Pts	NRR
1	New Zealand	9	6	2	0	1	13	1.776
2	Australia	6	6	0	0	0	12	2.985
3	Sri Lanka	9	6	3	0	0	12	0.261
4	West Indies	12	6	6	0	0	12	−0.040
5	Pakistan	9	5	4	0	0	10	1.159
6	England	6	4	1	0	1	9	1.502
7	India	3	3	0	0	0	6	3.453
8	South Africa	6	3	3	0	0	6	−0.471
9	Bangladesh	6	1	5	0	0	2	−1.616
10	Zimbabwe	12	1	11	0	0	2	−2.848
11	Ireland	6	0	6	0	0	0	−1.903

Updated to match(es) played on 28 October 2026. Source: ESPNcricinfo

== Fixtures ==
=== 2025–26 ===
==== West Indies v Sri Lanka ====
20 February 2026
Scorecard

Sri Lanka; 240/6 (50 overs)	v	West Indies; 230 (49.4 overs)

Sri Lanka won by 10 runs
National Cricket Stadium, St. George's
Points: West Indies 0, Sri Lanka 2

22 February 2026
Scorecard

Sri Lanka; 208 (47.1 overs)	v	West Indies; 194 (48 overs)

Sri Lanka won by 14 runs
National Cricket Stadium, St. George's
Points: West Indies 0, Sri Lanka 2

25 February 2026
Scorecard

Sri Lanka; 217/7 (50 overs)	v	West Indies; 218/4 (46 overs)

West Indies won by 6 wickets
National Cricket Stadium, St. George's
Points: West Indies 2, Sri Lanka 0.

==== South Africa v Pakistan ====
22 February 2026
Scorecard

South Africa; 260/6 (41 overs)	v	Pakistan; 223 (38.5 overs)

South Africa won by 37 runs
Mangaung Oval, Bloemfontein
Points: South Africa 2, Pakistan 0

25 February 2026 (D/N)
Scorecard

South Africa; 361/8 (50 overs)	v	Pakistan; 345 (49.5 overs)

South Africa won by 16 runs
Centurion Park, Centurion
Points: South Africa 2, Pakistan 0

1 March 2026
Scorecard

Pakistan; 306/8 (50 overs)	v	South Africa; 187 (36.2 overs)

Pakistan won by 119 runs
Kingsmead, Durban
Points: South Africa 0, Pakistan 2

==== New Zealand v Zimbabwe ====
5 March 2026
Scorecard

New Zealand; 354/3 (50 overs)	v	Zimbabwe; 174 (47.3 overs)

New Zealand won by 180 runs
University of Otago Oval, Dunedin
Points: New Zealand 2, Zimbabwe 0

8 March 2026
Scorecard

Zimbabwe; 102 (29.1 overs)	v	New Zealand; 106/2 (16.2 overs)

New Zealand won by 8 wickets
University of Otago Oval, Dunedin
Points: New Zealand 2, Zimbabwe 0

11 March 2026
Scorecard

New Zealand; 303/6 (50 overs)	v	Zimbabwe; 103 (27.1 overs)

New Zealand won by 200 runs
University of Otago Oval, Dunedin
Points: New Zealand 2, Zimbabwe 0

==== West Indies v Australia ====
27 March 2026 (D/N)
Scorecard

Australia; 341 (49.5 overs)	v	West Indies; 238/8 (50 overs)

Australia won by 103 runs
Warner Park Sporting Complex, Basseterre
Points: Australia 2, West Indies 0

29 March 2026 (D/N)
Scorecard

Australia; 269/7 (50 overs)	v	West Indies; 179 (46 overs)

Australia won by 90 runs
Warner Park Sporting Complex, Basseterre
Points: Australia 2, West Indies 0

2 April 2026 (D/N)
Scorecard

West Indies; 136 (35.4 overs)	v	Australia; 137/1 (19.4 overs)

Australia won by 9 wickets
Warner Park Sporting Complex, Basseterre
Points: Australia 2, West Indies 0

==== New Zealand v South Africa ====
29 March 2026 (D/N)
Scorecard

New Zealand; 268 (50 overs)	v	South Africa; 269/8 (50 overs)

South Africa won by 2 wickets
Hagley Oval, Christchurch
Points: South Africa 2, New Zealand 0

1 April 2026
Scorecard

South Africa; 346/6 (50 overs)	v	New Zealand; 350/8 (49.4 overs)

New Zealand won by 2 wickets
Basin Reserve, Wellington
Points: New Zealand 2, South Africa 0

4 April 2026
Scorecard

New Zealand; 306/7 (50 overs)	v	South Africa; 240 (46.1 overs)

New Zealand won by 66 runs
Basin Reserve, Wellington
Points: New Zealand 2, South Africa 0

=== 2026 ===
==== Bangladesh v Sri Lanka ====
20 April 2026
Scorecard

Sri Lanka; 205/9 (50 overs)	v	Bangladesh; 206/7 (48.3 overs)

Bangladesh won by 3 wickets
Shaheed Qamaruzzaman Stadium, Rajshahi
Points: Bangladesh 2, Sri Lanka 0

22 April 2026
Scorecard

Bangladesh; 165 (45.5 overs)	v	Sri Lanka; 166/6 (38.2 overs)

Sri Lanka won by 4 wickets
Shaheed Qamaruzzaman Stadium, Rajshahi
Points: Sri Lanka 2, Bangladesh 0

25 April 2026

Bangladesh; 213/8 (50 overs)	v	Sri Lanka; 214/3 (46.3 overs)

Sri Lanka won by 7 wickets
Shaheed Qamaruzzaman Stadium, Rajshahi
Points: Sri Lanka 2, Bangladesh 0

==== Pakistan v Zimbabwe ====
4 May 2026
Scorecard

Pakistan; 330/5 (50 overs)	v	Zimbabwe; 162 (36.4 overs)

Pakistan won by 168 runs
National Stadium, Karachi
Points: Pakistan 2, Zimbabwe 0

6 May 2026
Scorecard

Pakistan; 343/4 (50 overs)	v	Zimbabwe; 137 (39 overs)

Pakistan won by 206 runs
National Stadium, Karachi
Points: Pakistan 2, Zimbabwe 0

9 May 2026
Scorecard

Zimbabwe; 222/9 (50 overs)	v	Pakistan; 225/1 (31.5 overs)

Pakistan won by 9 wickets
National Stadium, Karachi
Points: Pakistan 2, Zimbabwe 0

==== England v New Zealand ====
10 May 2026
Scorecard

New Zealand; 210 (48.4 overs)	v	England; 211/9 (48.2 overs)

England won by 1 wicket
Riverside Ground, Chester-le-Street
Points: England 2, New Zealand 0

13 May 2026 (D/N)
Scorecard

England	v	New Zealand

No result
County Ground, Northampton
Points: England 1, New Zealand 1

16 May 2026
Scorecard

England; 181/7 (33 overs)	v	New Zealand; 141/4 (24.4 overs)

New Zealand won by 17 runs (DLS)
Sophia Gardens, Cardiff
Points: New Zealand 2, England 0

==== Ireland v West Indies ====
10 July 2026
Scorecard

Ireland; 269 (49 overs)	v	West Indies; 270/1 (38.4 overs)

West Indies won by 9 wickets
Bready Cricket Club Ground, Magheramason
Points: West Indies 2, Ireland 0

12 July 2026
Scorecard

Ireland; 241/7 (50 overs)	v	West Indies; 242/4 (38.5 overs)

West Indies won by 6 wickets
Bready Cricket Club Ground, Magheramason
Points: West Indies 2, Ireland 0

15 July 2026
Scorecard

West Indies; 257 (50 overs)	v	Ireland; 193 (43.1 overs)

West Indies won by 64 runs
Bready Cricket Club Ground, Magheramason
Points: West Indies 2, Ireland 0

==== Sri Lanka v Pakistan ====
23 July 2026
Scorecard

Sri Lanka; 210/9 (50 overs)	v	Pakistan; 211/5 (43 overs)

Pakistan won by 5 wickets
Mahinda Rajapaksa International Cricket Stadium, Hambantota
Points: Pakistan 2, Sri Lanka 0

25 July 2026
Scorecard

Pakistan; 273/5 (50 overs)	v	Sri Lanka; 275/2 (46.5 overs)

Sri Lanka won by 8 wickets
Mahinda Rajapaksa International Cricket Stadium, Hambantota
Points: Sri Lanka 2, Pakistan 0

28 July 2026
Scorecard

Pakistan; 187 (40 overs)	v	Sri Lanka; 191/2 (37.2 overs)

Sri Lanka won by 8 wickets
Mahinda Rajapaksa International Cricket Stadium, Hambantota
Points: Sri Lanka 2, Pakistan 0

==== England v Ireland ====
1 September 2026 (D/N)
Scorecard

Ireland; 281/5 (50 overs)	v	England; 283/4 (38.1 overs)

England won by 6 wickets
Grace Road, Leicester
Points: England 2, Ireland 0

3 September 2026 (D/N)
Scorecard

Ireland; 165 (47 overs)	v	England; 166/4 (23 overs)

England won by 6 wickets
County Ground, Derby
Points: England 2, Ireland 0

6 September 2026
Scorecard

England; 291 (48.5 overs)	v	Ireland; 177 (44.2 overs)

England won by 114 runs
New Road, Worcester
Points: England 2, Ireland 0

=== 2026–27 ===
==== Zimbabwe v West Indies ====
24 September 2026
Scorecard

West Indies; 299/6 (50 overs)	v	Zimbabwe; 200 (43.3 overs)

West Indies won by 99 runs
Harare Sports Club, Harare
Points: West Indies 2, Zimbabwe 0

27 September 2026
Scorecard

West Indies; 139 (39.3 overs)	v	Zimbabwe; 140/6 (40.5 overs)

Zimbabwe won by 4 wickets
Harare Sports Club, Harare
Points: Zimbabwe 2, West Indies 0

30 September 2026
Scorecard

West Indies; 271/5 (50 overs)	v	Zimbabwe; 180 (47.3 overs)

West Indies won by 91 runs
Harare Sports Club, Harare
Points: West Indies 2, Zimbabwe 0

==== Australia v Bangladesh ====
9 October 2026 (D/N)
Scorecard

Bangladesh; 166 (49.4 overs)	v	Australia; 3/168 (25.4 overs)

Australia won by 7 wickets
Allan Border Field, Brisbane
Points: Australia 2, Bangladesh 0

11 October 2026 (D/N)
Scorecard

Bangladesh; 6/220 (50 overs)	v	Australia; 1/222 (28.1 overs)

Australia won by 9 wickets
Allan Border Field, Brisbane
Points: Australia 2, Bangladesh 0

14 October 2026 (D/N)
Scorecard

Bangladesh; 172 (49.5 overs)	v	Australia; 2/175 (22.4 overs)

Australia won by 8 wickets
Allan Border Field, Brisbane
Points: Australia 2, Bangladesh 0

==== India v Zimbabwe ====
23 October 2026 (D/N)
Scorecard

Zimbabwe; 197 (49.5 overs)	v	India; 200/1 (27.1 overs)

India won by 9 wickets
Kotambi Stadium, Vadodara
Points: India 2, Zimbabwe 0

25 October 2026 (D/N)
Scorecard

India; 328/6 (50 overs)	v	Zimbabwe; 207 (48.5 runs)

India won by 121 runs
Kotambi Stadium, Vadodara
Points: India 2, Zimbabwe 0

28 October 2026 (D/N)
Scorecard

Zimbabwe; 131 (39.5 overs)	v	India; 133/2 (17 overs)

India won by 8 wickets
Kotambi Stadium, Vadodara
Points: India 2, Zimbabwe 0

==== Sri Lanka v Australia ====
15 December 2026

Sri Lanka	v	Australia

Rangiri Dambulla International Stadium, Dambulla

18 December 2026

Sri Lanka	v	Australia

Rangiri Dambulla International Stadium, Dambulla

20 December 2026

Sri Lanka	v	Australia

Rangiri Dambulla International Stadium, Dambulla

==== South Africa v India ====
16 December 2026

South Africa	v	India

Boland Park, Paarl

19 December 2026

South Africa	v	India

Newlands Cricket Ground, Cape Town

22 December 2026

South Africa	v	India

Maunguang Oval, Bloemfontein

==== Sri Lanka v England ====
4 March 2027

Sri Lanka	v	England

Rangiri Dambulla International Stadium, Dambulla

6 March 2027

Sri Lanka	v	England

Rangiri Dambulla International Stadium, Dambulla

8 March 2027

Sri Lanka	v	England

Rangiri Dambulla International Stadium, Dambulla

==== Australia v New Zealand ====
6 March 2027

Australia	v	New Zealand

Manuka Oval, Canberra

8 March 2027

Australia	v	New Zealand

CitiPower Centre, Melbourne

10 March 2027

Australia	v	New Zealand

CitiPower Centre, Melbourne

==== South Africa v Australia ====
3 April 2027

South Africa	v	Australia

Kingsmead, Durban

7 April 2027

South Africa	v	Australia

Boland Park, Paarl

10 April 2027

South Africa	v	Australia

St George's Park, Gqeberha

=== 2027 ===
==== Pakistan v New Zealand ====
April 2027

Pakistan	v	New Zealand

April 2027

Pakistan	v	New Zealand

April 2027

Pakistan	v	New Zealand

==== England v Bangladesh ====
17 September 2027

England	v	Bangladesh

County Ground, Hove

21 September 2027

England	v	Bangladesh

St Lawrence Ground, Canterbury

24 September 2027

England	v	Bangladesh

County Ground, Chelmsford

== Statistics ==
=== Most runs ===
Runs	Player	Mat	Inns	Ave
818	(Cricket West Indies) Hayley Matthews	12	12	74.36
552	(New Zealand) Maddy Green	9	8	92.00
523	(Cricket West Indies) Stafanie Taylor	12	12	58.11
488	(Pakistan) Sadaf Shamas	9	9	54.22
440	(Sri Lanka) Harshitha Samarawickrama	9	9	73.33
Last updated: 30 September 2026 | Source: ESPNcricinfo

=== Highest individual score ===
Score	Batsman	Balls	4s	6s	Opposition	Ground	Match date
182	(Cricket West Indies) Hayley Matthews	156	26	2	Zimbabwe	Harare	24 September 2026
179*	(New Zealand) Amelia Kerr	139	23	1	South Africa	Wellington	1 April 2026
159*	(Cricket West Indies) Hayley Matthews	123	24	2	Ireland	Bready	10 July 2026
157*	(New Zealand) Brooke Halliday	118	24	1	Zimbabwe	Dunedin	5 March 2026
141*	(New Zealand) Maddy Green	128	15	0	South Africa	Wellington	4 April 2026
Last updated: 24 September 2026 | Source: ESPNcricinfo

=== Most wickets ===
Wkts	Player	Mat	Inns	Ave
23	(New Zealand) Amelia Kerr	9	8	13.91
21	(Cricket West Indies) Afy Fletcher	12	12	24.61
17	(Cricket West Indies) Hayley Matthews	12	11	23.94
14	(New Zealand) Rosemary Mair	8	7	21.35
14	(Sri Lanka) Inoka Ranaweera	9	9	26.00
Last updated: 30 September 2026 | Source: ESPNcricinfo

=== Best bowling figures in an innings ===
BBI	Bowler	Overs	Mdns	Econ	Opposition	Ground	Match date
7/34	(New Zealand) Amelia Kerr	9.1	1	3.70	Zimbabwe	Dunedin	8 March 2026
6/56	(South Africa) Ayabonga Khaka	10	1	5.60	New Zealand	Christchurch	29 March 2026
5/19	(Australia) Alana King	10	0	1.90	West Indies	Basseterre	2 April 2026
5/22	(New Zealand) Amelia Kerr	3.1	0	6.94	Zimbabwe	Dunedin	11 March 2026
5/33	(England) Issy Wong	10	1	3.30	Ireland	Derby	3 September 2026
Last updated: 6 September 2026 | Source: ESPNcricinfo
