= Seshnie Naidu =

South African cricketer

Personal information
- Born: 5 January 2006 (age 20); Pietermaritzburg, KwaZulu-Natal, South Africa
- Batting: Right-handed
- Bowling: Right-arm leg break
- Role: All-rounder

International information
- National side: South Africa
- Only ODI (cap 95): 9 May 2025 v Sri Lanka
- ODI shirt no.: 21
- T20I debut (cap 63): 16 September 2024 v Pakistan
- Last T20I: 20 September 2024 v Pakistan
- T20I shirt no.: 21

Domestic team information
- Years: Team
- 2020–present: KwaZulu-Natal Coastal

Career statistics
Competition	ODI	T20I	WLA	WT20
Matches	1	3	24	22
Runs scored	–	–	121	94
Batting average	–	–	6.72	10.44
100s/50s	–	–	0/0	0/0
Top score	–	–	25	23
Balls bowled	30	36	654	318
Wickets	1	1	24	18
Bowling average	40.00	68.00	20.00	18.50
5 wickets in innings	0	0	0	0
10 wickets in match	0	0	0	0
Best bowling	1/40	1/25	4/20	3/17
Catches/stumpings	0/–	1/–	8/–	2/–
Medal record
Women's cricket
Representing South Africa
ICC T20 World Cup
Runner-up	2024 UAE
African Games
Silver medal – second place	2023 Accra
- Source: CricInfo, 17 September 2024

Seshnie Naidu (born 5 January 2006) is a South African cricketer who currently plays for KwaZulu-Natal Coastal and South Africa women's cricket team. She plays as an all-rounder.

== Domestic career ==
Naidu made her List A debut for KwaZulu-Natal Coastal on 7 March 2020, against Western Province in 2019–20 CSA Women's Provincial League. She made her Women's Twenty20 debut for KwaZulu-Natal Coastal against Western Province, on 8 March 2020 in 2019–20 CSA Women's Provincial T20 Competition.

== International career ==
In December 2022, Naidu was selected in the South Africa Under-19 squad for the 2023 ICC Under-19 Women's T20 World Cup. She played five matches at the tournament, took 5 wickets at an average of 22.40.

In March 2024, she named in South Africa Emerging team for the 2023 African Games. She took five wickets with the average of 11.00 in that tournament.

In September 2024, she was earned her maiden call-up for national team for the T20I series against Pakistan and the 2024 ICC Women's T20 World Cup. She made her Twenty20 International (T20I) debut against Pakistan on 16 September 2024. She took a one-hand stunning catch of Muneeba Ali, and took a wicket of Sadaf Shamas.

She was named in the South Africa squad for the 2024 ICC Women's T20 World Cup. In December 2024, she was named in South Africa under-19 squad for the 2025 Under-19 Women's T20 World Cup.

In April 2025, she was earned maiden call-up for the ODI squad for the Tri-Nation Series against Sri Lanka and India.
