= West Indies women's cricket team in England in 2025 =

International cricket tour

	England	West Indies
- Dates: 21 May – 7 June 2025
Captains	Nat Sciver-Brunt	Hayley Matthews (Note: Shemaine Campbelle captained West Indies in the 2nd and 3rd ODIs.)

One Day International series
- Results: England won the 3-match series 3–0
Most runs	Amy Jones (251)	Qiana Joseph (96)
Most wickets	Linsey Smith (7)	Aaliyah Alleyne (3); Afy Fletcher (3); Karishma Ramharack (3)
- Player of the series: Amy Jones (Eng)

Twenty20 International series
- Results: England won the 3-match series 3–0
Most runs	Heather Knight (109)	Hayley Matthews (177)
Most wickets	Lauren Bell (7)	Zaida James (3); Hayley Matthews (3)
- Player of the series: Hayley Matthews (WI)

The West Indies women's cricket team toured England in May and June 2025 to play the England women's cricket team. The tour consisted of three One Day International (ODI) and three Twenty20 International (T20I) matches. In August 2024, the England and Wales Cricket Board (ECB) confirmed the fixtures for the tour, as a part of the 2025 home international season. The series ran alongside the men's series between England and West Indies.

== Squads ==
England		West Indies
ODIs	T20Is	ODIs & T20Is
Nat Sciver-Brunt (c); Emily Arlott; Tammy Beaumont; Lauren Bell; Alice Capsey; Kate Cross; Alice Davidson-Richards; Charlie Dean; Sophia Dunkley; Lauren Filer; Mahika Gaur; Sarah Glenn; Amy Jones; ~~Heather Knight~~; Emma Lamb; Linsey Smith	Nat Sciver-Brunt (c); Emily Arlott; Tammy Beaumont; Lauren Bell; Alice Capsey; Charlie Dean; Sophia Dunkley; Sarah Glenn; Amy Jones; Heather Knight; Paige Scholfield; Linsey Smith; Issy Wong; Danni Wyatt-Hodge	Hayley Matthews (c); Shemaine Campbelle (vc, wk); Aaliyah Alleyne; Jahzara Claxton; Afy Fletcher; Cherry-Ann Fraser; Shabika Gajnabi; Jannillea Glasgow; Realeanna Grimmond; Zaida James; Qiana Joseph; Mandy Mangru; Ashmini Munisar; Karishma Ramharack; Stafanie Taylor

On 27 May, Alice Capsey was add to the ODI squad as cover for Heather Knight, who was struck with a hamstring problem during the third T20I. Lauren Filer was also added to the ODI squad. On 29 May, Heather Knight was ruled out of the ODI series due to a significant tendon injury.

== Tour match ==
18 May 2025
14:30
Scorecard

West Indies; 175/4 (20 overs)	v	England Development XI; 95/7 (20 overs)
Qiana Joseph 62 (35); Phoebe Brett 2/35 (4 overs)		Charlotte Stubbs; Karishma Ramharack 2/11 (2 overs)

West Indies won by 80 runs
St Lawrence Ground, Canterbury
Umpires: Rose Fernando (Eng) and Jack Shantry (Eng)

- England Development XI won the toss and elected to field.

== T20I series ==
=== 1st T20I ===
21 May 2025
18:30 (N)
Scorecard

West Indies; 146/7 (20 overs)	v	England; 150/2 (16.3 overs)
Hayley Matthews 100* (67); Lauren Bell 2/24 (4 overs)		Sophia Dunkley 81* (56); Afy Fletcher 1/27 (3 overs)

England won by 8 wickets
St Lawrence Ground, Canterbury
Umpires: Anna Harris (Eng) and Claire Polosak (Aus)
Player of the match: Hayley Matthews (WI)

- England won the toss and elected to field.
- Emily Arlott (Eng) and Realeanna Grimmond (WI) both made their T20I debuts.
- Hayley Matthews broke the record for the most hundreds (3) in women's T20Is for the West Indies, going past Deandra Dottin (2).
- Sophia Dunkley (Eng) completed 1000 runs in T20Is. She became the second fastest to that mark in terms of balls faced (829).

=== 2nd T20I ===
23 May 2025
18:35 (N)
Scorecard

West Indies; 81/9 (20 overs)	v	England; 82/1 (9.2 overs)
Shemaine Campbelle 26 (36); Emily Arlott 3/14 (4 overs)		Nat Sciver-Brunt 55* (30); Zaida James 1/12 (2 overs)

England won by 9 wickets
County Cricket Ground, Hove
Umpires: Rose Fernando (SL) and Anna Harris (Eng)
Player of the match: Emily Arlott (Eng)

- England won the toss and elected to field.

=== 3rd T20I ===
26 May 2025
14:30
Scorecard

England; 144/5 (20 overs)	v	West Indies; 127/8 (20 overs)
Heather Knight 66* (47); Hayley Matthews 3/32 (4 overs)		Hayley Matthews 71 (54); Lauren Bell 4/11 (4 overs)

England won by 17 runs
County Cricket Ground, Chelmsford
Umpires: Claire Polosak (Aus) and Sue Redfern (Aus)
Player of the match: Hayley Matthews (WI)

- West Indies won the toss and elected to field.
- Jahzara Claxton (WI) made her T20I debut.

== ODI series ==
=== 1st ODI ===
30 May 2025
13:00 (D/N)
Scorecard

England; 345/6 (50 overs)	v	West Indies; 237 (48.2 overs)
Amy Jones 122 (121); Hayley Matthews 2/49 (10 overs)		Qiana Joseph 62 (74); Linsey Smith 5/36 (10 overs)

England won by 108 runs
County Cricket Ground, Derby
Umpires: Anna Harris (Eng) and Claire Polosak (Aus)
Player of the match: Amy Jones (Eng)

- England won the toss and elected to bat.
- Emily Arlott, Linsey Smith (Eng) and Jahzara Claxton (WI) all made their ODI debuts.
- Amy Jones (Eng) scored her first century in ODIs.
- Alice Capsey (Eng) scored her 1,000th run in international cricket.
- Linsey Smith (Eng) took her first five-wicket haul in ODIs.

=== 2nd ODI ===
4 June 2025
13:00 (D/N)
Scorecard

England; 366/6 (50 overs)	v	West Indies; 223 (45.4 overs)
Amy Jones 129 (98); Karishma Ramharack 2/57 (10 overs)		Realeanna Grimmond 53 (72); Alice Capsey 3/41 (8.4 overs)

England won by 143 runs
Grace Road, Leicester
Umpires: Sue Redfern (Eng) and Jack Shantry (Eng)
Player of the match: Amy Jones (Eng)

- England won the toss and elected to bat.
- Realeanna Grimmond (WI) made her ODI debut.
- Kate Cross (Eng) played in her 100th international match for England across all formats.
- Amy Jones and Tammy Beaumont (Eng) became the first opening pair - women's or men's - to score back-to-back hundreds in ODI history.
- Kate Cross became the fastest English fast bowler to take 100 wickets in ODI.

=== 3rd ODI ===
7 June 2025
11:00
Scorecard

West Indies; 106/8 (21 overs)	v	England; 109/1 (10.5 overs)
Qiana Joseph 34 (44); Sarah Glenn 3/21 (4 overs)		Nat Sciver-Brunt 57* (33); Karishma Ramharack 1/31 (3 overs)

England won by 9 wickets (DLS method)
County Cricket Ground, Taunton
Umpires: Claire Polosak (Aus) and Sue Redfern (Eng)
Player of the match: Sarah Glenn (Eng)

- England won the toss and elected to field.
- The match was reduced to 21 overs per side due to rain and England were set a revised target of 106 runs.
- Amy Jones (Eng) played in her 100th ODI match.
