= Ireland women's cricket team in England in 2026 =

International cricket tour

	England	Ireland
- Dates: 1 – 6 September 2026
Captains	Charlie Dean	Gaby Lewis

One Day International series
- Results: England won the 3-match series 3–0
Most runs	Sophia Dunkley (212)	Amy Hunter (165)
Most wickets	Issy Wong (7)	Cara Murray (8)
- Player of the series: Sophia Dunkley (Eng)

The Ireland women's cricket team toured England in September 2026 to play the England women's cricket team. The tour consisted of three One Day International (ODI) matches. The ODI series formed part of the 2025–2029 ICC Women's Championship. In July 2025, the England and Wales Cricket Board (ECB) confirmed the fixtures for the tour, as a part of the 2026 home international season.

== Squads ==
England	Ireland
Charlie Dean (c); Maia Bouchier; Alice Capsey (wk); Kira Chathli (wk); Tilly Corteen-Coleman; Sophia Dunkley; Lauren Filer; Dani Gibson; Jodi Grewcock; Freya Kemp; Ryana Macdonald-Gay; Charis Pavely; Grace Potts; Mady Villiers; Issy Wong	Gaby Lewis (c); Orla Prendergast (vc); Christina Coulter Reilly; Georgina Dempsey; Amy Hunter (wk); Arlene Kelly; Louise Little; Jane Maguire; Lara McBride; Kia McCartney; Cara Murray; Leah Paul; Rebecca Stokell; Alice Tector

== ODI series ==
=== 1st ODI ===
1 September 2026
13:00 (D/N)
Scorecard

Ireland; 281/5 (50 overs)	v	England; 283/4 (38.1 overs)
Gaby Lewis 69 (89); Charlie Dean 2/44 (10 overs)		Maia Bouchier 104 (95); Cara Murray 3/58 (9 overs)

England won by 6 wickets
Grace Road, Leicester
Umpires: Rose Dovey (Eng) and Eloise Sheridan (Aus)
Player of the match: Maia Bouchier (Eng)

- England won the toss and elected to field.
- This was England's highest successful run chase in Women's One Day Internationals.
- Women's Championship points: England 2, Ireland 0.

=== 2nd ODI ===
3 September 2026
13:00 (D/N)
Scorecard

Ireland; 165 (47 overs)	v	England; 166/4 (23 overs)
Amy Hunter 64 (96); Issy Wong 5/33 (10 overs)		Maia Bouchier 45 (31); Kia McCartney 2/45 (6 overs)

England won by 6 wickets
County Ground, Derby
Umpires: Ian Blackwell (Eng) and Gabi Brown (Eng)
Player of the match: Issy Wong (Eng)

- England won the toss and elected to field.
- Issy Wong (Eng) took her maiden five-wicket haul in ODIs.
- Women's Championship points: England 2, Ireland 0.

=== 3rd ODI ===
6 September 2026
10:30
Scorecard

England; 291 (48.5 overs)	v	Ireland; 177 (44.2 overs)
Sophia Dunkley 119 (119); Cara Murray 4/56 (10 overs)		Amy Hunter 39 (58); Lauren Filer 3/27 (8.2 overs)

England won by 114 runs
New Road, Worcester
Umpires: Gabi Brown (Eng) and Eloise Sheridan (Aus)
Player of the match: Sophia Dunkley (Eng)

- Ireland won the toss and elected to field.
- Arlene Kelly (Ire) played in her last ODI.
- Women's Championship points: England 2, Ireland 0.
