= Bangladesh women's cricket team in Australia in 2026–27 =

International cricket tour

	Australia	Bangladesh
- Dates: 9 – 14 October 2026
Captains	Tahlia McGrath	Nigar Sultana

One Day International series
- Results: Australia won the 3-match series 3–0
Most runs	Georgia Voll (161)	Sobhana Mostary (129)
Most wickets	Megan Schutt (10)	Habiba Islam (2)
- Player of the series: Megan Schutt (Aus)

The Bangladesh women's cricket team toured Australia in October 2026 to play three One Day International (ODI) matches with the Australia women's cricket team. The ODI series formed part of the 2025–2029 ICC Women's Championship. In March 2026, Cricket Australia (CA) confirmed the fixtures for the tour, as a part of the 2026–27 home international season.

Originally, the tour consisted of three WODI and three WT20I matches. In June 2026, following the rescheduling of the 2027 Women's Champions Trophy from June to February 2027, the tour was rescheduled to only three WODI matches.

== Squads ==
Australia	Bangladesh
Tahlia McGrath (c); Ashleigh Gardner (vc); Nicola Carey; Kim Garth; Alana King; Phoebe Litchfield; Beth Mooney (wk); Ellyse Perry; Megan Schutt; Annabel Sutherland; Georgia Voll; Georgia Wareham	Nigar Sultana (c, wk); Sharmin Akhter; Dilara Akter (wk); Marufa Akter; Nahida Akter; Shorna Akter; Disha Biswas; Fargana Hoque; Habiba Islam; Rabeya Khan; Murshida Khatun; Sultana Khatun; Sanjida Akter Meghla; Ritu Moni; Sobhana Mostary; Sharmin Sultana

== ODI series ==
=== 1st ODI ===
9 October 2026
13:50 (D/N)
Scorecard

Bangladesh; 166 (49.4 overs)	v	Australia; 3/168 (25.4 overs)
Ritu Moni 45 (63); Annabel Sutherland 4/30 (9.4 overs)		Phoebe Litchfield 77 (57); Habiba Islam 2/36 (6 overs)

Australia won by 7 wickets
Allan Border Field, Brisbane
Umpires: Lauren Agenbag (SA) and Eloise Sheridan (Aus)
Player of the match: Annabel Sutherland (Aus)

- Australia won the toss and elected to field.
- Habiba Islam (Ban) made her ODI debut.
- Megan Schutt (Aus) took her 150th ODI wicket.
- Women's Championship points: Australia 2, Bangladesh 0.

=== 2nd ODI ===
11 October 2026
13:50 (D/N)
Scorecard

Bangladesh; 6/220 (50 overs)	v	Australia; 1/222 (28.1 overs)
Sobhana Mostary 118 (134); Megan Schutt 4/36 (10 overs)		Georgia Voll 131* (97); Shorna Akter 1/32 (4 overs)

Australia won by 9 wickets
Allan Border Field, Brisbane
Umpires: Lauren Agenbag (SA) and Claire Polosak (Aus)
Player of the match: Georgia Voll (Aus)

- Australia won the toss and elected to field.
- Sobhana Mostary (Ban) scored her maiden century in ODIs. She also became the first Bangladeshi women to score a century against Australia.
- Women's Championship points: Australia 2, Bangladesh 0.

=== 3rd ODI ===
14 October 2026
13:50 (D/N)
Scorecard

Bangladesh; 172 (49.5 overs)	v	Australia; 2/175 (22.4 overs)
Shorna Akter 54 (71); Megan Schutt 4/16 (10 overs)		Annabel Sutherland 74* (52); Sultana Khatun 1/32 (3 overs)

Australia won by 8 wickets
Allan Border Field, Brisbane
Umpires: Lauren Agenbag (SA) and Phillip Gillespie (Aus)
Player of the match: Megan Schutt (Aus)

- Australia won the toss and elected to field.
- Disha Biswas (Ban) made her ODI debut.
- Women's Championship points: Australia 2, Bangladesh 0.
