= South Africa women's cricket team in New Zealand in 2025–26 =

International cricket tour

	New Zealand	South Africa
- Dates: 15 March – 4 April 2026
Captains	Amelia Kerr	Laura Wolvaardt

One Day International series
- Results: New Zealand won the 3-match series 2–1
Most runs	Maddy Green (239)	Laura Wolvaardt (154)
Most wickets	Rosemary Mair (7)	Ayabonga Khaka (9)
- Player of the series: Maddy Green (NZ)

Twenty20 International series
- Results: New Zealand won the 5-match series 4–1
Most runs	Amelia Kerr (276)	Annerie Dercksen (114)
Most wickets	Sophie Devine (9)	Ayabonga Khaka (8)
- Player of the series: Amelia Kerr (NZ)

The South Africa women's cricket team toured New Zealand in March and April 2026 to play the New Zealand women's cricket team. The tour consisted of three One Day International (ODI) and five Twenty20 International (T20I) matches. The ODI series formed part of the 2025–2029 ICC Women's Championship. In June 2025, the New Zealand Cricket (NZC) confirmed the fixtures for the tour as a part of the 2025–26 home international season.

== Squads ==
New Zealand		South Africa
ODIs	T20Is	ODIs and T20Is
Amelia Kerr (c); Suzie Bates; Flora Devonshire; Izzy Gaze (wk); Maddy Green; Brooke Halliday; Bree Illing; Jess Kerr; Kayley Knight; Rosemary Mair; Nensi Patel; Georgia Plimmer; Izzy Sharp (wk)	Amelia Kerr (c); Suzie Bates; Sophie Devine; Flora Devonshire (Note: Only for 3rd, 4th and 5th T20Is); Izzy Gaze (wk); Maddy Green; Brooke Halliday; Bree Illing (Note: Only for 1st and 2nd T20Is); Polly Inglis (wk); Jess Kerr; Rosemary Mair; Nensi Patel; Georgia Plimmer; Izzy Sharp (wk); Lea Tahuhu	Laura Wolvaardt (c); Anneke Bosch; Tazmin Brits; Nadine de Klerk; Annerie Dercksen; Ayanda Hlubi; Sinalo Jafta (wk); Ayabonga Khaka; Masabata Klaas; Suné Luus; Karabo Meso (wk); Nonkululeko Mlaba; Kayla Reyneke; Tumi Sekhukhune; Chloe Tryon; ~~Dane van Niekerk~~

On 17 March, Dane van Niekerk was ruled out of the tour due to a calf injury, and Anneke Bosch was named as her replacement.

== T20I series ==
=== 1st T20I ===
15 March 2026
14:45
Scorecard

New Zealand; 190/7 (20 overs)	v	South Africa; 110/7 (20 overs)
Amelia Kerr 78 (44); Masabata Klaas 2/15 (4 overs)		Tazmin Brits 29 (35); Sophie Devine 2/13 (4 overs)

New Zealand won by 80 runs
Bay Oval, Mount Maunganui
Umpires: Shaun Haig (NZ) and Claire Polosak (Aus)
Player of the match: Amelia Kerr (NZ)

- New Zealand won the toss and elected to bat.

=== 2nd T20I ===
17 March 2026
14:45
Scorecard

South Africa; 177/5 (20 overs)	v	New Zealand; 159 (19.1 overs)
Tazmin Brits 53 (43); Amelia Kerr 2/29 (4 overs)		Amelia Kerr 32 (18); Ayabonga Khaka 4/27 (3 overs)

South Africa won by 18 runs
Seddon Park, Hamilton
Umpires: Kim Cotton (NZ) and Claire Polosak (Aus)
Player of the match: Kayla Reyneke (SA)

- South Africa won the toss and elected to bat.
- Amelia Kerr (NZ) took her 100th wicket in T20Is.

=== 3rd T20I ===
20 March 2026
14:45
Scorecard

South Africa; 149/7 (20 overs)	v	New Zealand; 152/4 (18.4 overs)
Laura Wolvaardt 37 (39); Suzie Bates 2/10 (2 overs)		Sophie Devine 55* (38); Annerie Dercksen 1/17 (2 overs)

New Zealand won by 6 wickets
Eden Park, Auckland
Umpires: Wayne Knights (NZ) and Claire Polosak (Aus)
Player of the match: Sophie Devine (NZ)

- South Africa won the toss and elected to bat.

=== 4th T20I ===
22 March 2026
14:45
Scorecard

South Africa; 159/6 (20 overs)	v	New Zealand; 160/4 (18.3 overs)
Annerie Dercksen 55* (32); Jess Kerr 3/16 (4 overs)		Sophie Devine 64 (34); Chloe Tryon 2/13 (3 overs)

New Zealand won by 6 wickets
Wellington Regional Stadium, Wellington
Umpires: Kim Cotton (NZ) and Claire Polosak (Aus)
Player of the match: Jess Kerr (NZ)

- South Africa won the toss and elected to bat.
- Lea Tahuhu (NZ) played in her 100th T20I.

=== 5th T20I ===
25 March 2026
14:45
Scorecard

New Zealand; 194/6 (20 overs)	v	South Africa; 102/9 (20 overs)
Amelia Kerr 105 (55); Tumi Sekhukhune 3/32 (3 overs)		Annerie Dercksen 23 (18); Lea Tahuhu 3/15 (4 overs)

New Zealand won by 92 runs
Hagley Oval, Christchurch
Umpires: Chris Brown (NZ) and Claire Polosak (Aus)
Player of the match: Amelia Kerr (NZ)

- South Africa won the toss and elected to field.

== ODI series ==
=== 1st ODI ===
29 March 2026
14:00 (D/N)
Scorecard

New Zealand; 268 (50 overs)	v	South Africa; 269/8 (50 overs)
Maddy Green 85 (83); Ayabonga Khaka 6/56 (10 overs)		Annerie Dercksen 72 (93); Amelia Kerr 2/31 (10 overs)

South Africa won by 2 wickets
Hagley Oval, Christchurch
Umpires: Kim Cotton (NZ) and Claire Polosak (Aus)
Player of the match: Kayla Reyneke (SA)

- South Africa won the toss and elected to field.
- Flora Devonshire (NZ) and Kayla Reyneke (SA) made their ODI debuts.
- Women's Championship points: South Africa 2, New Zealand 0

=== 2nd ODI ===
1 April 2026
11:00
Scorecard

South Africa; 346/6 (50 overs)	v	New Zealand; 350/8 (49.4 overs)
Anneke Bosch 91 (90); Bree Illing 3/60 (10 overs)		Amelia Kerr 179* (139); Ayabonga Khaka 3/51 (10 overs)

New Zealand won by 2 wickets
Basin Reserve, Wellington
Umpires: Kim Cotton (NZ) and Tina Semmens (NZ)
Player of the match: Amelia Kerr (NZ)

- New Zealand won the toss and elected to field.
- Kayley Knight (NZ) made her ODI debut.
- This was the highest successful chase in Women's ODIs.
- Women's Championship points: New Zealand 2, South Africa 0

=== 3rd ODI ===
4 April 2026
11:00
Scorecard

New Zealand; 306/7 (50 overs)	v	South Africa; 240 (46.1 overs)
Maddy Green 141* (128); Ayanda Hlubi 2/47 (10 overs)		Laura Wolvaardt 69 (68); Rosemary Mair 5/50 (9.1 overs)

New Zealand won by 66 runs
Basin Reserve, Wellington
Umpires: Shaun Haig (NZ) and Claire Polosak (Aus)
Player of the match: Maddy Green (NZ)

- South Africa won the toss and elected to field.
- Women's Championship points: New Zealand 2, South Africa 0
