= West Indian cricket team in England in 2025 =

International cricket tour

	England	West Indies
- Dates: 29 May – 10 June 2025
Captains	Harry Brook	Shai Hope

One Day International series
- Results: England won the 3-match series 3–0
Most runs	Joe Root (267)	Keacy Carty (154)
Most wickets	Adil Rashid (9)	Alzarri Joseph (7)
- Player of the series: Joe Root (Eng)

Twenty20 International series
- Results: England won the 3-match series 3–0
Most runs	Jos Buttler (165)	Rovman Powell (126)
Most wickets	Liam Dawson (5); Luke Wood (5)	Alzarri Joseph (3); Romario Shepherd (3)
- Player of the series: Jos Buttler (Eng)

The West Indies cricket team toured England in May and June 2025 to play the England cricket team. The tour consisted of three One Day International (ODI) and three Twenty20 International (T20I) matches. In August 2024, the England and Wales Cricket Board (ECB) confirmed the fixtures for the tour, as a part of the 2025 home international season. The series ran alongside the women's series between England and West Indies.

== Squads ==
England		West Indies	
ODIs	T20Is	ODIs	T20Is
Harry Brook (c); ~~Jofra Archer~~; ~~Gus Atkinson~~; Tom Banton; Jacob Bethell; Jos Buttler (wk); Brydon Carse; Ben Duckett; Tom Hartley; Will Jacks; Saqib Mahmood; Jamie Overton; Matthew Potts; Adil Rashid; Joe Root; Jamie Smith (wk); Luke Wood	Harry Brook (c); Rehan Ahmed; Tom Banton; Jacob Bethell; Jos Buttler (wk); Brydon Carse; Liam Dawson; Ben Duckett; Will Jacks; Saqib Mahmood; ~~Jamie Overton~~; Matthew Potts; Adil Rashid; ~~Phil Salt (wk)~~; Jamie Smith (wk); Luke Wood	Shai Hope (c, wk); Jewel Andrew (wk); Jediah Blades; Keacy Carty; Roston Chase; Matthew Forde; Justin Greaves; Shimron Hetmyer; Amir Jangoo (wk); Alzarri Joseph; Shamar Joseph; Brandon King; Evin Lewis; Gudakesh Motie; Sherfane Rutherford; Jayden Seales; ~~Romario Shepherd~~	Shai Hope (c, wk); Johnson Charles; Roston Chase; Matthew Forde; Shimron Hetmyer; Jason Holder; Akeal Hosein; Alzarri Joseph; Brandon King; Evin Lewis; Gudakesh Motie; Rovman Powell; Andre Russell; Sherfane Rutherford; Romario Shepherd

On 16 May, Sherfane Rutherford and Romario Shepherd withdrew from the ODI squad in order to remain at the 2025 IPL. They were replaced by Jediah Blades and Shimron Hetmyer. Rutherford later returned for the 3rd ODI.

On 21 May, Jofra Archer was ruled out of the ODI series due to a right thumb injury, with Luke Wood added as his replacement. On 27 May, Gus Atkinson was ruled out of the ODI series due to a hamstring strain. On 31 May, Jamie Overton was ruled out of the reminder of the ODI series and the T20I series due to a broken right little finger.

On 5 June, Phil Salt was ruled out of the T20I series for paternity leave, with Jamie Smith added into the squad as his replacement.

== ODI series ==
=== 1st ODI ===
29 May 2025
13:00 (D/N)
Scorecard

England; 400/8 (50 overs)	v	West Indies; 162 (26.2 overs)
Jacob Bethell 82 (53); Jayden Seales 4/84 (9 overs)		Jayden Seales 29* (14); Jamie Overton 3/22 (5.2 overs)

England won by 238 runs
Edgbaston, Birmingham
Umpires: Kumar Dharmasena (SL) and Martin Saggers (Eng)
Player of the match: Jacob Bethell (Eng)

- West Indies won the toss and elected to field.
- Adil Rashid (Eng) played in his 150th ODI match.
- Brandon King (WI) played in his 50th ODI match.
- It was the first time that seven different batters (Eng) scored 30-plus in an ODI innings. It also became the first ODI where a team had reached 400 without a single batter scoring a century.
- Harry Brook (Eng) equalled Jonty Rhodes' record for most catches by a fielder in an innings (5) in ODIs.

=== 2nd ODI ===
1 June 2025
11:00
Scorecard

West Indies; 308 (47.4 overs)	v	England; 312/7 (48.5 overs)
Keacy Carty 103 (105); Adil Rashid 4/63 (10 overs)		Joe Root 166* (139); Alzarri Joseph 4/31 (10 overs)

England won by 3 wickets
Sophia Gardens, Cardiff
Umpires: Adrian Holdstock (SA) and Graham Lloyd (Eng)
Player of the match: Joe Root (Eng)

- England won the toss and elected to field.
- Joe Root (Eng) overtook Eoin Morgan as England's leading run-scorer in ODIs, and became the first English cricketer to complete 7,000 runs in ODIs.

=== 3rd ODI ===
3 June 2025
13:00 (D/N)
Scorecard

West Indies; 251/9 (40 overs)	v	England; 246/3 (29.4 overs)
Sherfane Rutherford 70 (71); Adil Rashid 3/40 (8 overs)		Jamie Smith 64 (28); Roston Chase 1/19 (5 overs)

England won by 7 wickets
The Oval, London
Umpires: Kumar Dharmasena (SL) and Martin Saggers (Eng)
Player of the match: Jamie Smith (Eng)

- England won the toss and elected to field.
- The match was reduced to 40 overs per side due to rain and England were set a revised target of 246 runs.
- England scored their highest ever 10-over score in an ODI (121/1).
- Joe Root (Eng) completed 21,000 international runs.

== T20I series ==
=== 1st T20I ===
6 June 2025
18:30 (N)
Scorecard

England; 188/6 (20 overs)	v	West Indies; 167/9 (20 overs)
Jos Buttler 96 (59); Romario Shepherd 2/33 (4 overs)		Evin Lewis 39 (23); Liam Dawson 4/20 (4 overs)

England won by 21 runs
Riverside Ground, Chester-le-Street
Umpires: Mike Burns (Eng) and Graham Lloyd (Eng)
Player of the match: Liam Dawson (Eng)

- England won the toss and elected to bat.
- Matthew Potts (Eng) made his T20I debut.
- Liam Dawson (Eng) achieved his career-best bowling figures in T20Is, taking 4 wickets for 20 runs in 4 overs.

=== 2nd T20I ===
8 June 2025
14:30
Scorecard

West Indies; 196/6 (20 overs)	v	England; 199/6 (18.3 overs)
Shai Hope 49 (38); Luke Wood 2/25 (4 overs)		Jos Buttler 47 (36); Alzarri Joseph 2/49 (4 overs)

England won by 4 wickets
Bristol County Ground, Bristol
Umpires: Martin Saggers (Eng) and Russell Warren (Eng)
Player of the match: Luke Wood (Eng)

- England won the toss and elected to field.
- Adil Rashid (Eng) bowled the second most expensive T20I over (31) by an English player, with only Stuart Broad conceding more (36).
- This was the highest combined total in a T20I match where no batter from either team scored a fifty.

=== 3rd T20I ===
10 June 2025
18:30 (N)
Scorecard

England; 248/3 (20 overs)	v	West Indies; 211/8 (20 overs)
Ben Duckett 84 (46); Sherfane Rutherford 1/20 (2 overs)		Rovman Powell 79* (45); Luke Wood 3/31 (4 overs)

England won by 37 runs
Rose Bowl, Southampton
Umpires: Mike Burns (Eng) and Russell Warren (Eng)
Player of the match: Ben Duckett (Eng)

- West Indies won the toss and elected to field.
- England scored their highest ever 10-over score in a T20I (135/1).
