= Shaheed Qamaruzzaman Stadium =

Sports stadium

- শহীদ কামরুজ্জামান স্টেডিয়াম
- Rajshahi Cricket Stadium
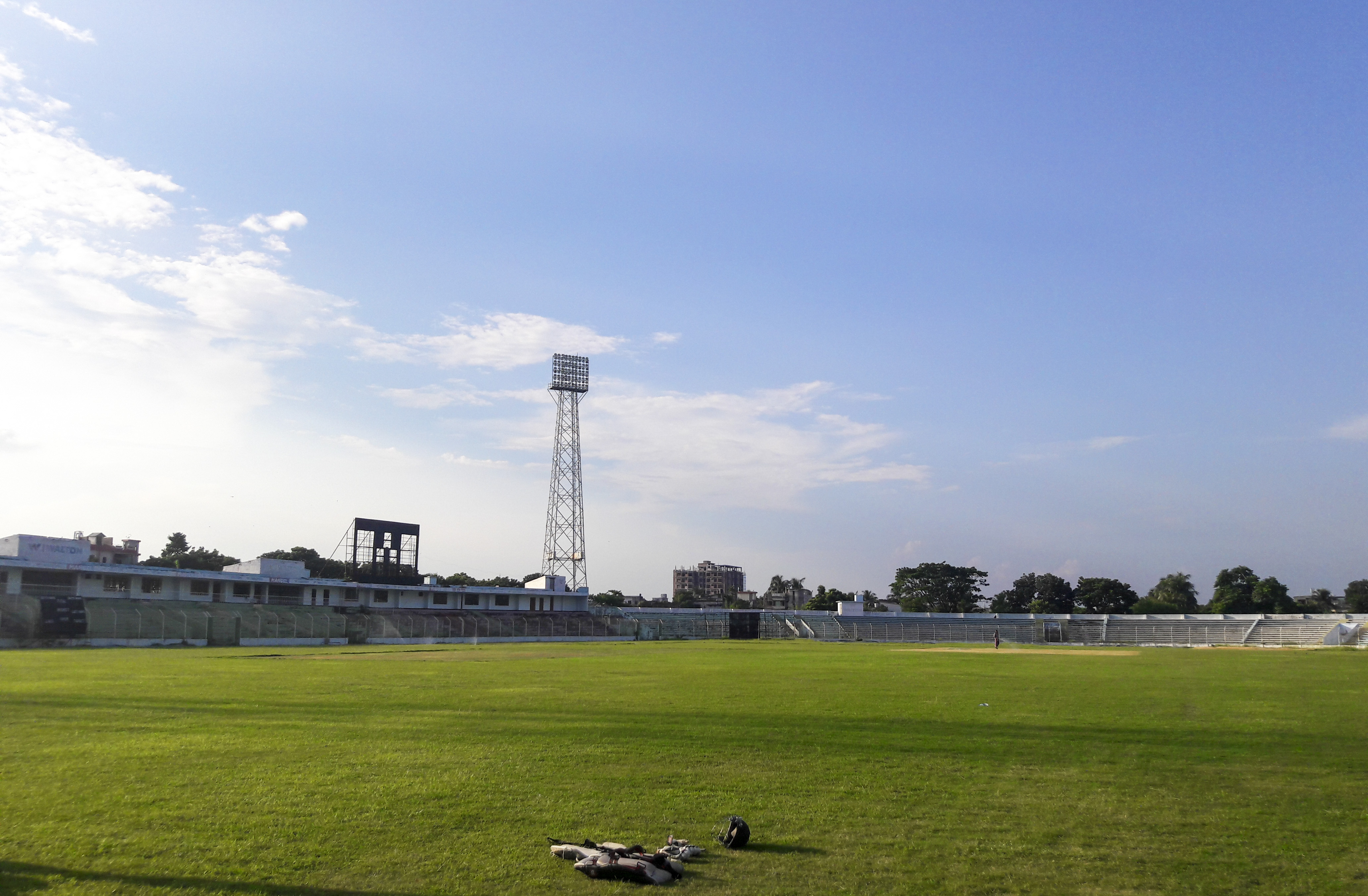
- Shaheed Kamruzzaman Stadium
- Interactive map of Shaheed Qamaruzzaman Stadium
- Full name: Shaheed AHM Kamruzzaman Stadium
- Former names: Rajshahi Divisional Stadium
- Location: Rajshahi, Bangladesh
- Coordinates: 24°22′52.68″N 88°35′27.98″E
- Owner: National Sports Council
- Operator: National Sports Council
- Capacity: 15,000
- Surface: Grass (Oval)
- Field size: 186 m × 138 m (610 ft × 453 ft)

Construction
- Built: 2004
- Opened: 2004

Tenants
- Bangladesh national cricket team Rajshahi Warriors; Rajshahi Division cricket team

Ground information
- Home club: Rajshahi Warriors; Rajshahi Division cricket team

International information
- First women's ODI: 20 April 2026: Bangladesh v Sri Lanka
- Last women's ODI: 25 April 2026: Bangladesh v Sri Lanka

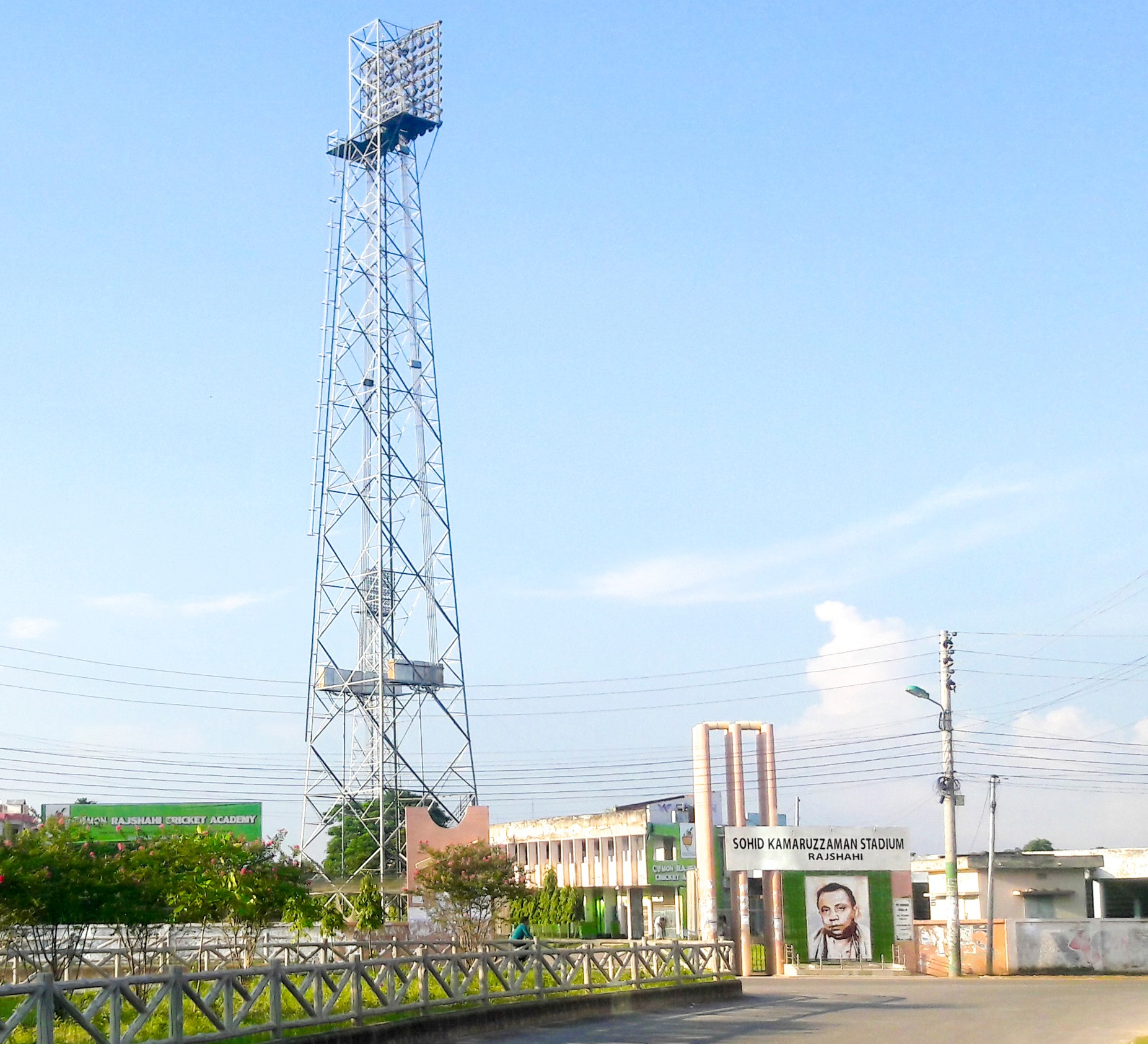
Shaheed Kamruzzaman Stadium Entrance

Shaheed A. H. M. Qamaruzzaman Stadium (Bengali: শহীদ এএইচএম কামারুজ্জামান স্টেডিয়াম), also known as Rajshahi Divisional Stadium, is a multi-use stadium in Rajshahi, Bangladesh. The stadium is named after AHM Qumaruzzaman, who was one of the four national leaders.

The stadium hosted its first international match on 20 April 2026 when Sri Lankan women's cricket team toured Bangladesh and the venue hosted all three Women's One Day International matches of the series.

== History ==
It is currently used mostly for cricket matches. The stadium has capacity for 15,000 spectators and was built in 2004. The venue has hosted three group stage matches of 2004 Under-19 Cricket World Cup and four matches of 2010 South Asian Games. Three one-day international and one Twenty20 match between Under-19 cricket team of Bangladesh and Pakistan were held in 2023 after a long 13-year gap.

The stadium recently got funding from the government to increase its seating capacity and make major improvements on the field. The stadium will be leased by the BPL's local franchise Rajshahi Warriors to use it as the home field for the team. It is the largest stadium of Northern Bangladesh. It is also the home ground of Rajshahi division in the National Cricket League. Beside this stadium, the Clemon Cricket Academy is situated.

== Stats ==
Till 2026 the venue has hosted

- WODI – 3
- WT20I – 3

== See also ==
- Stadiums in Bangladesh
- List of cricket grounds in Bangladesh
- List of women's One Day International cricket grounds
- List of women's Twenty20 International cricket grounds
- AHM Qumaruzzaman
- Sport in Bangladesh
- Sri Lankan women's team in Bangladesh in 2026
