= 2019–20 CSA Women's Provincial League =

South African women's domestic cricket season

- Dates: 12 October 2019 – 28 March 2020
- Administrator(s): Cricket South Africa
- Cricket format: 50 over
- Tournament format(s): Round robin
- Champions: North West (3rd title)
- Participants: 16
- Matches: 50 (45 completed)
- Most runs: Anneke Bosch (396)
- Most wickets: Delmi Tucker (16)

The 2019–20 CSA Women's Provincial League was the 25th edition of South Africa's provincial one-day cricket tournament. It ran from October 2019 to March 2020, with 16 provincial teams taking part. The tournament was curtailed by the outbreak of the COVID-19 pandemic, with North West winning their third one-day title based on an adjusted points system.

== Competition format ==
The 16 teams were divided into three divisions: a top division named "Top 6", and two lower divisions, Pools A and B. Teams in Pools A and B played each other team in their group once in a round-robin format, whilst teams in the Top 6 league played each other team in their group twice. Matches were played using a one day format, with 50 overs per side.

The winner of the Top 6 league was crowned the Champions. The bottom team in the Top 6 were relegated, with the best-performing team in Pools A and B promoted. Due to the COVID-19 pandemic, the final five matches in the Top 6 league were cancelled. The points given to each team were therefore adjusted to simulate an equal number of matches played. The tournament ran concurrently with the 2019–20 CSA Women's Provincial T20 Competition, with matches played either the day before or day after the corresponding encounter between two teams in the T20 tournament.

The groups worked on a points system with positions being based on the total points. Points were awarded as follows:

Win: 4 points
Tie: 3 points
Loss: 0 points.
Abandoned/No Result: 2 points.
Bonus Point: 1 bonus point available per match.

== Teams ==
| Top 6 | Central Gauteng | Free State | KwaZulu-Natal Coastal | Northerns | North West | Western Province |
| Pool A | Boland | Border | Eastern Province | Kei | South Western Districts | |
| Pool B | Easterns | KwaZulu-Natal Inland | Limpopo | Mpumalanga | Northern Cape | |

== Tables ==
=== Top 6 ===
| Team | Pld | W | L | T | NR | A | BP | Adj (Note: The last round of matches were cancelled due to the COVID-19 pandemic. To adjust for this, teams that had only played eight matches at that point were awarded an additional eighth of their point share.) | Pts | NRR |
|---|---|---|---|---|---|---|---|---|---|---|
| North West (C) | 9 | 7 | 2 | 0 | 0 | 0 | 6 | 0 | 34 | +1.695 |
| Western Province | 8 | 6 | 2 | 0 | 0 | 0 | 4 | 3.5 | 31.5 | +1.291 |
| Central Gauteng | 9 | 4 | 4 | 0 | 0 | 1 | 3 | 0 | 21 | –0.018 |
| KwaZulu-Natal Coastal | 8 | 3 | 4 | 0 | 0 | 1 | 2 | 2 | 18 | –0.047 |
| Northerns | 8 | 2 | 5 | 0 | 0 | 1 | 0 | 1.25 | 11.25 | –1.802 |
| Free State (R) | 8 | 1 | 6 | 0 | 0 | 1 | 0 | 0.75 | 6.75 | –1.618 |

=== Pool A ===
| Team | Pld | W | L | T | NR | A | BP | Pts | NRR |
|---|---|---|---|---|---|---|---|---|---|
| Border (P) | 4 | 4 | 0 | 0 | 0 | 0 | 4 | 20 | +2.346 |
| Eastern Province | 4 | 3 | 1 | 0 | 0 | 0 | 3 | 15 | +1.790 |
| South Western Districts | 4 | 2 | 2 | 0 | 0 | 0 | 2 | 10 | +1.770 |
| Boland | 4 | 1 | 3 | 0 | 0 | 0 | 1 | 5 | +0.044 |
| Kei | 4 | 0 | 4 | 0 | 0 | 0 | 0 | 0 | –5.718 |

=== Pool B ===
| Team | Pld | W | L | T | NR | A | BP | Pts | NRR |
|---|---|---|---|---|---|---|---|---|---|
| Easterns | 4 | 3 | 1 | 0 | 0 | 0 | 3 | 15 | +0.927 |
| Northern Cape | 4 | 2 | 1 | 0 | 0 | 1 | 2 | 12 | +2.063 |
| Mpumalanga | 4 | 2 | 1 | 0 | 0 | 1 | 1 | 11 | +0.753 |
| KwaZulu-Natal Inland | 4 | 1 | 3 | 0 | 0 | 0 | 0 | 4 | –1.335 |
| Limpopo | 4 | 1 | 3 | 0 | 0 | 0 | 0 | 4 | –1.397 |
