= Umm-e-Hani =

Pakistani cricketer (born 1996)

Personal information
- Born: 12 August 1996 (age 30); Faisalabad, Pakistan
- Batting: Right-handed
- Bowling: Right-arm off break
- Role: Bowler

International information
- National side: Pakistan
- ODI debut (cap 87): 9 November 2022 v Ireland
- Last ODI: 18 December 2023 v New Zealand
- ODI shirt no.: 12
- T20I debut (cap 53): 3 September 2023 v South Africa
- Last T20I: 3 December 2023 v New Zealand
- T20I shirt no.: 12

Domestic team information
- Years: Team
- 2015–2017: Faisalabad
- 2016/17: Higher Education Commission

Career statistics
Competition	ODI
Matches	1
Runs scored	–
Batting average	–
100s/50s	–
Top score	–
Balls bowled	60
Wickets	1
Bowling average	48.00
5 wickets in innings	–
10 wickets in match	–
Best bowling	1/48
Catches/stumpings	0/–
- Source: ESPNcricinfo, 20 February 2024

Umm-e-Hani (born 12 August 1996) is a Pakistani cricketer who plays for the national cricket team mainly as a right-arm off break bowler.

In October 2022, she was named in the One Day International (ODI) squad for Ireland's tour of Pakistan. She made her ODI debut on 9 November 2022 against Ireland at Gaddafi Stadium, Lahore. In July 2023, she was selected in Pakistan's 2023 Asian Games squad. She made her Twenty20 International (T20I) debut for Pakistan, against South Africa, on 3 September 2023.
