= Fatima Sana =

Pakistani cricketer

Personal information
- Full name: Fatima Sana
- Born: 8 November 2001 (age 25); Karachi, Pakistan
- Batting: Right handed
- Bowling: Right arm medium-fast
- Role: Bowling all-rounder

International information
- National side: Pakistan
- ODI debut (cap 79): 6 May 2019 v South Africa
- Last ODI: 28 July 2026 v Sri Lanka
- T20I debut (cap 43): 15 May 2019 v South Africa
- Last T20I: 22 September 2026 v Bangladesh
- T20I shirt no.: 14

Domestic team information
- Years: Team
- 2015–2017: Karachi
- 2018/19: Zarai Taraqiati Bank Limited
- 2022: Barbados Tridents
- 2023/24: Canterbury
- 2026: Birmingham Phoenix
- 2026/27: Perth Scorchers

Career statistics
Competition	WODI	WT20I	WLA	WT20
Matches	56	50	42	25
Runs scored	632	507	414	151
Batting average	16.20	28.16	16.56	37.75
100s/50s	0/3	0/1	0/1	0/0
Top score	90*	90	56	41*
Balls bowled	1362	550	1,619	517
Wickets	73	41	51	26
Bowling average	28.58	28.53	25.15	21.57
5 wickets in innings	1	0	1	0
10 wickets in match	0	0	0	0
Best bowling	5/39	4/26	5/39	3/23
Catches/stumpings	10/–	20/–	9/–	10/–
Medal record
Representing Pakistan
Women's Cricket
Asian Games
Bronze medal – third place	2026 Aichi–Nagoya	Team
- Source: CricketArchive, 21 February 2023

Fatima Sana (born 8 November 2001) is a Pakistani cricketer who plays primarily as a right-arm medium-fast bowler. Fatima is the current captain of the Pakistan women's national cricket team. She has played domestic cricket for Karachi, Zarai Taraqiati Bank Limited, Barbados Tridents, Canterbury Magicians and Birmingham Phoenix. In 2021, She won the ICC Women's Emerging Cricketer of the Year award, becoming the first woman cricketer from Pakistan to win an ICC Accolade. She became the first Pakistan player to feature in the Women's Hundred. She also became the second Pakistani woman to feature in the WBBL, following Nida Dar, after signing with the Perth Scorchers for the 2026–27 season. She broke the record for the fastest fifty in Women's T20I history in May 2026, achieving the milestone off just 15 balls against Zimbabwe. She smashed a 90 off just 41 balls, including 7 sixes and 9 fours, against South Africa on February 10, 2026, rescuing Pakistan from 64 for 6 to 180 for 9 and setting the world record for the highest individual score by a woman batting at No. 7 or lower in Women's T20I history. Under her captaincy, Pakistan beat Bangladesh by 31 runs to win bronze medal at the 2026 Asian Games.

== Career ==
In April 2019, she was named in Pakistan's squad for their series against South Africa. She made her Women's One Day International (WODI) debut for Pakistan against South Africa on 6 May 2019. Her Women's Twenty20 International (WT20I) debut, on 15 May 2019, was also against South Africa in the same tour. In January 2020, she was named in Pakistan's squad for the 2020 ICC Women's T20 World Cup in Australia. In December 2020, she was shortlisted as one of the Women's Emerging Cricketer of the Year for the 2020 PCB Awards.

In June 2021, Sana was part of Pakistan's squad that toured the West Indies. In the final match of the tour, Sana took her first five-wicket haul in WODIs, with 5/39. In October 2021, she was named in Pakistan's team for the 2021 Women's Cricket World Cup Qualifier tournament in Zimbabwe. In January 2022, she was named in Pakistan's team for the 2022 Women's Cricket World Cup in New Zealand. In May 2022, she was named in Pakistan's team for the cricket tournament at the 2022 Commonwealth Games in Birmingham, England. She was Pakistan's leading wicket-taker in the tournament. In August 2022, she was signed as an overseas player for Barbados Royals for the inaugural edition of the Women's Caribbean Premier League.

Following an injury to Nida Dar in the first ODI against New Zealand, Sana captained the side in the second ODI on 13 December 2023, at Hagley Park, Christchurch.

In August 2024, the Pakistan Cricket Board named Sana as captain when it announced the 15-member squad for the 2024 ICC Women's T20 World Cup.

Sana was captain of the Pakistan squad for the 2025 Women's Cricket World Cup Qualifier at home in April 2025, where Pakistan won the qualifier and remained unbeaten throughout the tournament. She finished as Pakistan's highest wicket-taker with 12 wickets and also chipped in with 103 runs. She was named player of the match against Thailand for her 62 not out and 3-39, and finished the tournament just one wicket behind leading wicket-taker Hayley Matthews.

She also captained Pakistan at the 2025 Women's Cricket World Cup, the 2026 Women's T20 World Cup where she was named in the Team of the Tournament, the 2026 Women's Twenty20 Asia Cup and the 2026 Asian Games, where Pakistani team won a bronze medal. She also served as one of Pakistan’s flag-bearers alongside squash player Noor Zaman during the opening ceremony of the Games.

She smashed the world record for the fastest half-century in Women's T20 International cricket off just 15 balls against Zimbabwe on May 15, 2026. During the third T20I at the National Bank Stadium in Karachi, Sana scored an unbeaten 62 runs from 19 deliveries, helping Pakistan total 223-4. She broke the previous record of an 18-ball fifty previously shared by Sophie Devine, Phoebe Litchfield, and Richa Ghosh.

In 2026, Fatima emerged as Pakistan's standout performer in women's Twenty20 Internationals, scoring 540 runs, the most by any Pakistan batter that year at an average of 45 and a strike rate close to 150, second only to India's Shafali Verma among batters who passed 400 runs. She struck more sixes than any of her teammates, and in matches Pakistan won, her average rose to 55.8. She was also Pakistan's leading wicket-taker for the year, claiming 31 wickets in 21 matches at an average of 15.6.

== Awards ==
- 2021 ICC Women's Emerging Cricketer of the Year award
- 2021 ICC Women's ODI Team of the Year
- ICC Women's Player of the Month award in July 2021 and April 2025; Nominated for February 2026
