= Kaushini Nuthyangana =

Sri Lankan cricketer

Personal information
- Full name: Edirisooriya Mohottilage Kaushini Nuthyanga Heram Senavirathna
- Born: 5 August 2002 (age 24); Colombo, Sri Lanka
- Batting: Right-handed
- Role: Wicket-keeper

International information
- National side: Sri Lanka
- ODI debut (cap 84): 20 February 2026 v West Indies
- Last ODI: 22 February 2026 v West Indies
- T20I debut (cap 52): 2 October 2022 v United Arab Emirates
- Last T20I: 8 October 2022 v Malaysia
- T20I shirt no.: 33

Domestic team information
- Years: Team
- 2018/19–2021/22: Colts Cricket Club
- 2022: Ace Capital Cricket Club

Career statistics
Competition	WT20I
Matches	3
Runs scored	9
Batting average	3.00
100s/50s	0/0
Top score	8
Catches/stumpings	1/–
Medal record
Women's cricket
Representing Sri Lanka
Asia Cup
Runner-up	2026 UAE
Asian Games
Silver medal – second place	2022 Hangzhou
Silver medal – second place	2026 Aichi–Nagoya	Team
- Source: Cricinfo, 4 February 2023

Edirisooriya Mohottilage Kaushini Nuthyanga Heram Senavirathna (born 5 August 2002), commonly known as Kaushini Nuthyangana is a Sri Lankan cricketer who plays for the Sri Lanka women's cricket team as a left-hand batter and wicket-keeper.

== International career ==
In June 2022, Nuthyangana was named in Sri Lanka's Women's One Day International (WODI) and Women's Twenty20 International (WT20I) squad for the series against India.

In September 2022, she was named in the national squad for the Women's Asia Cup. She made her WT20I debut on 2 October 2023 against UAE in Women's Asia Cup 2022 at Sylhet International Cricket Stadium Academy Ground, Sylhet.

She was a member of Sri Lanka's squad for the 2023 ICC Women's T20 World Cup in South Africa.
