= Malki Madara =

Sri Lankan cricketer (born 2000)

Personal information
- Full name: Palle Kankanamage Malki Madara
- Born: 30 December 2000 (age 25); Akuressa, Matara, Sri Lanka
- Batting: Right-handed
- Bowling: Right-arm medium
- Role: Bowler

International information
- National side: Sri Lanka
- ODI debut (cap 80): 27 April 2025 v India
- Last ODI: 11 May 2025 v India
- ODI shirt no.: 15
- T20I debut (cap 55): 14 March 2025 v New Zealand
- Last T20I: 18 March 2025 v New Zealand
- T20I shirt no.: 15

Domestic team information
- Years: Team
- 2020/21: Colts Cricket Club
- 2022–present: Sri Lanka Air Force Sports Club

Career statistics
Competition	ODI	T20I	LA	T20
Matches	5	3	37	13
Runs scored	2	2	329	46
Batting average	0.66	–	14.30	7.66
100s/50s	0/0	0/0	0/2	0/0
Top score	2	2*	81*	14
Balls bowled	234	59	851	155
Wickets	6	3	17	8
Bowling average	42.83	17.66	39.70	21.75
5 wickets in innings	0	0	0	0
10 wickets in match	0	0	0	0
Best bowling	4/50	3/14	4/50	3/14
Catches/stumpings	3/–	1/–	12/–	3/–
- Source: Cricinfo, 2 August 2025

Palle Kankanamage Malki Madara (born 30 December 2000, known as Malki Madara) is a Sri Lankan cricketer who plays for the Sri Lanka women's cricket team as a right-arm medium fast bowler.

== Career ==
In February 2025, Madara earned her maiden call-up for national team in ODI and T20I squad for the series against New Zealand. She made her T20I debut in the same series on 14 March 2025, when her three wickets earned her the player of the match award.

In April 2025, Madara named in the ODI squad for the Tri-Nation series against India and South Africa. She made her ODI debut in same tournament against India on 27 April 2025. She took four wickets against South Africa on her second international match on 2 May 2025.
