= Nimali Perera =

Sri Lankan cricket umpire (born 1990)

Personal information
- Full name: Thuse Perera Liyanaralalage Nimali Dinushani Perera
- Born: 13 December 1990 (age 35); Kaluthara, Sri Lanka
- Batting: Right-handed
- Bowling: Right-arm slow
- Role: Umpire

Domestic team information
- Years: Team
- 2013–2015: Sri Lanka Army Sports Club

Umpiring information
- WODIs umpired: 20 (2023–2026)
- WT20Is umpired: 50 (2022–2026)
- LA umpired: 3 (2022)

Career statistics
Competition	WLA	WT20
Matches	21	13
Runs scored	231	104
Batting average	12.83	9.45
100s/50s	0/0	0/0
Top score	35	38*
Balls bowled	60	74
Wickets	1	3
Bowling average	44.00	29.66
5 wickets in innings	0	0
10 wickets in match	0	0
Best bowling	1/2	2/20
Catches/stumpings	3/–	2/–
- Source: CricketArchive, 25 April 2024

Nimali Perera (born 13 December 1990) is a Sri Lankan cricket umpire. She is currently a member of Development Panel of ICC Umpires. She was one of the female umpires named by the ICC to stand in matches in the 2023 ICC Women's T20 World Cup. Perera played for Sri Lanka Army Sports Club in domestic cricket.

== Career ==
In July 2022, she was added to the ICC's Development panel for the first time. She was the first female umpire from Sri Lanka to feature in a T20 World Cup. She officiated in List A matches in the Major Clubs Limited Over Tournament in 2022 and she stood in her first List A match on 19 July 2022, between Panadura and Kandy.

She stood as an umpire in her first Women's Twenty20 International (WT20I) in the 2022 Women's Twenty20 Asia Cup, in the game between Malaysia and Pakistan on 2 October 2022. She also officiate in the semi-final match between India and Australia of 2023 ICC Women's T20 World Cup, along with New Zealand's Kim Cotton. She stood in her first Women's One Day International (WODI) between Sri Lanka and Bangladesh on 29 April 2023, when Bangladesh tour to Sri Lanka.

In September 2024 she was named as part of an all-female officiating group for the 2024 ICC Women's T20 World Cup.
