= Kavisha Dilhari =

Sri Lankan cricketer

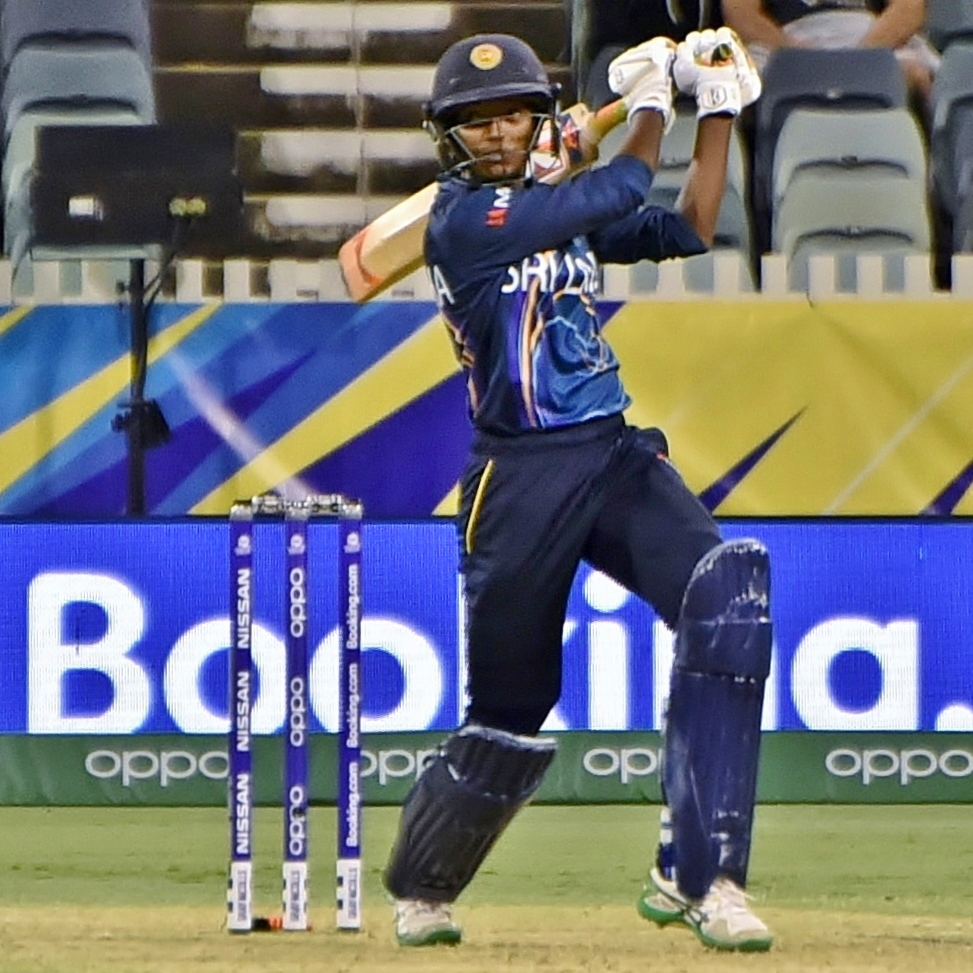
- Dilhari batting for Sri Lanka during the 2020 ICC Women's T20 World Cup

Personal information
- Full name: Welikonthage Kavisha Dilhari
- Born: 24 January 2001 (age 25); Rathgama, Sri Lanka
- Batting: Right-handed
- Bowling: Right-arm offbreak
- Role: All-rounder

International information
- National side: Sri Lanka
- ODI debut (cap 70): 20 March 2018 v Pakistan
- Last ODI: 18 June 2024 v West Indies
- T20I debut (cap 45): 19 September 2018 v India
- Last T20I: 13 August 2024 v Ireland
- T20I shirt no.: 6

Career statistics
| Competition | WODI | WT20I |
|---|---|---|
| Matches | 23 | 62 |
| Runs scored | 403 | 483 |
| Batting average | 25.18 | 14.63 |
| 100s/50s | 0/1 | 0/1 |
| Top score | 84 | 51* |
| Balls bowled | 677 | 1114 |
| Wickets | 22 | 50 |
| Bowling average | 30.77 | 22.28 |
| 5 wickets in innings | 0 | 0 |
| 10 wickets in match | 0 | 0 |
| Best bowling | 4/20 | 4/13 |
| Catches/stumpings | 5/– | 28/– |
Medal record
Women's cricket
Representing Sri Lanka
Asia Cup
| Winner | 2024 Sri Lanka |
| Runner-up | 2022 Bangladesh |
| Runner-up | 2026 UAE |
Asian Games
| Silver medal – second place | 2022 Hangzhou |
| Silver medal – second place | 2026 Aichi–Nagoya | Team |
South Asian Games
| Silver medal – second place | 2019 Kathmandu |
- Source: Cricinfo, 14 August 2024

Kavisha Dilhari (born 24 January 2001) is a Sri Lankan cricketer who plays for the women's national cricket team. She has played domestic cricket since the age of fifteen. She made her Women's One Day International cricket (WODI) debut for Sri Lanka Women against Pakistan Women on 20 March 2018.

In September 2018, she was named in Sri Lanka's Women's Twenty20 International (WT20I) squad for the series against India. She made her WT20I debut for Sri Lanka against India Women on 19 September 2018.

In October 2018, she was named in Sri Lanka's squad for the 2018 ICC Women's World Twenty20 tournament in the West Indies. In November 2019, she was named as the vice-captain of Sri Lanka's squad for the women's cricket tournament at the 2019 South Asian Games. The Sri Lankan team won the silver medal, after losing to Bangladesh by two runs in the final. In January 2020, she was named in Sri Lanka's squad for the 2020 ICC Women's T20 World Cup in Australia. In October 2021, she was named in Sri Lanka's team for the 2021 Women's Cricket World Cup Qualifier tournament in Zimbabwe. In January 2022, she was named in Sri Lanka's team for the 2022 Commonwealth Games Cricket Qualifier tournament in Malaysia. She was part of Sri Lanka's team for the cricket tournament at the 2022 Commonwealth Games in Birmingham, England, and for the 2024 ICC Women's T20 World Cup.
