= Dewmi Vihanga =

Sri Lankan cricketer (born 2005)

Personal information
- Full name: Dewmi Wijerathne Vihanga Mallawa Arachchige
- Born: 2 August 2005 (age 21)
- Batting: Right-handed
- Bowling: Right-arm offbreak
- Role: Bowling All-rounder

International information
- National side: Sri Lanka
- ODI debut (cap 82): 2 May 2025 v South Africa
- Last ODI: 11 May 2025 v India
- ODI shirt no.: 2

Domestic team information
- Years: Team
- 2020/21–present: Chilaw Marians Cricket Club

Career statistics
Competition	ODI	LA	T20
Matches	4	28	11
Runs scored	21	217	59
Batting average	7.00	9.04	7.37
100s/50s	0/0	0/0	0/0
Top score	16	31	22
Balls bowled	234	955	180
Wickets	11	34	6
Bowling average	18.81	17.38	28.66
5 wickets in innings	1	1	0
10 wickets in match	0	0	0
Best bowling	5/43	5/43	2/21
Catches/stumpings	1/–	6/–	2/–
Medal record
Women's cricket
Representing India
ACC Asia Cup
Runner-up	2026 UAE
- Source: Cricinfo, 13 July 2025

Dewmi Wijerathne Vihanga Mallawa Arachchige (born 2 August 2005, known as Dewmi Vihanga) is a Sri Lankan cricketer who plays for the Sri Lanka women's cricket team as a right-hand batter and right-arm off-break bowler. She has also played for Sri Lanka women's under-19 cricket team.

== Career ==
In 2019, Vihanga played for Dambulla in Women’s Super Provincial T20 cricket tournament. In January 2023, Vihanga was named in Sri Lanka's squad for the 2023 Under-19 Women's T20 World Cup. She was named in the team of tournament in the first edition of Under-19 Women's T20 World Cup. In same year in April, she was named in Sri Lanka Cricket Board XI team for the warm up match against Bangladesh.

In April 2025, Vihanga named in Sri Lanka national team for the ODI Tri-Nation series against India and South Africa. She made her ODI debut in same tournament against South Africa on 2 May 2025. She took her first five-wicket haul in ODIs, against South Africa on 9 May, and became the second highest wicket-taker of the tournament (11) behind the Sneh Rana (15).
