= Tasmia Rubab =

Pakistani cricketer (born 2002)

Personal information
- Born: 20 December 2002 (age 23); Multan, Punjab, Pakistan
- Batting: Right handed
- Bowling: Left-arm medium-fast
- Role: Bowler

International information
- National side: Pakistan
- Only ODI (cap 94): 1 March 2026 v South Africa
- T20I debut (cap 56): 18 September 2024 v South Africa
- Last T20I: 16 February 2026 v South Africa
- T20I shirt no.: 10

Domestic team information
- Years: Team
- 2023–present: Multan

Career statistics
Competition	WLA	WT20
Matches	10	13
Runs scored	94	11
Batting average	11.75	2.75
100s/50s	0/0	0/0
Top score	26*	10
Balls bowled	360	228
Wickets	12	5
Bowling average	16.00	51.40
5 wickets in innings	0	0
10 wickets in match	0	0
Best bowling	2/14	2/17
Catches/stumpings	5/–	2/–
- Source: CricketArchive, 30 September 2024

Tasmia Rubab (born 20 December 2002) is a Pakistani cricketer who plays for Pakistan women's cricket team as a left-arm medium-fast bowler and right hand batter. She has also played domestic cricket for Multan.

== Career ==
In October 2023, she was named in Pakistan's A squad for the one-day series against West Indies A and for T20 Tri-series against West Indies A and Thailand A.

In June 2024, she was picked to T20I squad for the 2024 Women's Twenty20 Asia Cup. In August 2024, she was selected to the Pakistan's national squad for the 2024 ICC Women's T20 World Cup and for the T20I series against South Africa. She made her Twenty20 International (T20I) debut against South Africa on 18 September 2024.

She was named in the Pakistan squad for the 2024 ICC Women's T20 World Cup.
