= Gull Feroza =

Pakistani cricketer

Personal information
- Born: 28 December 1998 (age 27)
- Batting: Right-handed
- Role: Wicket-keeper

International information
- National side: Pakistan
- ODI debut (cap 92): 9 April 2025 v Ireland
- Last ODI: 11 April 2025 v Scotland
- T20I debut (cap 49): 24 May 2022 v Sri Lanka
- Last T20I: 6 October 2024 v India
- T20I shirt no.: 56

Domestic team information
- Years: Team
- 2016–2017: Multan
- 2018–2018/19: Higher Education Commission

Career statistics
| Competition | WT20I |
|---|---|
| Matches | 18 |
| Runs scored | 284 |
| Batting average | 17.75 |
| 100s/50s | 0/2 |
| Top score | 62* |
| Catches/stumpings | 6/– |
- Source: Cricinfo, 9 April 2025

Gull Feroza (born 28 December 1998) is a Pakistani cricketer who plays as a right-handed batter and wicket-keeper. She has also played domestic cricket for Multan and Higher Education Commission.

== International career ==
In May 2022, she was named in Women's One Day International (WODI) and Women's Twenty20 International (WT20I) squads for Sri Lanka's tour of Pakistan. She made her WT20I debut on 24 May 2022, against Sri Lanka at Southend Club Cricket Stadium, Karachi.

Later the same month, she was named in Pakistan's team for the cricket tournament at the 2022 Commonwealth Games in Birmingham, England.

She was named in the Pakistan squad for the 2024 ICC Women's T20 World Cup.

Feroza was part of the Pakistan squad for the 2025 Women's Cricket World Cup Qualifier at home in April 2025.
