= Jahzara Claxton =

Saint Kitts and Nevis footballer and Leeward Islands cricketer

- Born: Jahzara Keanna Chloe Claxton; 12 March 2006 (age 20); Sandy Point Town, Saint Kitts and Nevis
Association football career
- Position: Forward
Team information
- Current team: Newtown United
Senior career*
Years	Team	Apps	(Gls)
- Newtown United
International career^{‡}
2019	Saint Kitts and Nevis U14	3	(11)
2022	Saint Kitts and Nevis U17	3	(2)
2020–	Saint Kitts and Nevis U20	6	(3)
2022–	Saint Kitts and Nevis	6	(4)
- * Club domestic league appearances and goals ‡ National team caps and goals as of 8 April 2022
- Cricket career

Cricket information
- Batting: Left-handed
- Bowling: Right-arm medium
- Role: Bowler

International information
- National side: West Indies (2025–present)
- ODI debut (cap 102): 30 May 2025 v England
- Last ODI: 4 June 2025 v England
- ODI shirt no.: 19
- T20I debut (cap 55): 26 May 2025 v England
- Last T20I: 20 June 2025 v South Africa
- T20I shirt no.: 19

Domestic team information
- Years: Team
- 2023–present: Leeward Islands
- 2023–present: Barbados Royals
- Source: ESPNcricinfo, 26 May 2025

Jahzara Keanna Chloe Claxton (born 12 March 2006) is a Saint Kitts and Nevis footballer and cricketer. In football, she plays as a forward for Newtown United FC and the Saint Kitts and Nevis women's national team. In cricket, she plays as a left-handed batter and right-arm medium bowler for Leeward Islands. She has also played cricket for West Indies Under-19s, becoming the first ever female cricketer from the Leeward Islands to be selected for the West Indies U19 squad.

== Football career ==
=== Club career ===
Claxton has played for Newtown United in Saint Kitts and Nevis.

=== International career ===
In 2019, Claxton represented the Saint Kitts and Nevis U14 at the Caribbean Football Union Caribbean Challenge Series. On August 9, 2019, she scored five goals in an 8–0 victory over Dominica U14. On August 10, 2019, she scored four goals in a 4–2 victory over Antigua and Barbuda U14. She scored 11 goals in the team's three games as they finished second in their group.

Claxton represented Saint Kitts and Nevis U20 at two CONCACAF Women's U-20 Championship editions (2020 and 2022). On 27 February 2022, she scored a hat-trick against Trinidad and Tobago U20. She is the second top goal-scorer for Caribbean U20 girls.

She made her senior debut on 3 February 2022 as a 62nd-minute substitution in a 3–0 friendly away win over Anguilla, scoring the team's third goal. On 8 April 2022, she scored the winning goal in a 2–1 victory over Guatemala during 2022 CONCACAF W Championship qualification, scoring a goal with her back.

== Cricket career ==
In 2022, she played with the Leewards Islands U19 team. In September 2022, she was named to a provisional roster and invited to a training camp for the West Indies women's under-19 cricket team. In November 2022, she was officially named to the West Indies women's under-19 cricket team. She is the first female cricketer from St. Kitts, as well as the first female cricketer from the Leeward Islands to be selected to the West Indies U19 squad. She was awarded a financial contribution from the Saint Kitts and Nevis Ministry of Sports to develop her sporting skills further as well as to offset expenses while she was representing the West Indies team. She participated with the team at the 2023 Under-19 Women's T20 World Cup. In 2023, she made her debut for the Leeward Islands. In December 2024, she was named in Under-19 team again for the 2025 Under-19 Women's T20 World Cup. She earned maiden call-up for West Indies team for their series against England. She became the first St Kitts woman to debut for West Indies in international cricket.

== Personal life ==
In December 2022, she was named one of the 25 Most Remarkable Teens by the National Assembly of St Kitts and Nevis.
