= Realeanna Grimmond =

West Indian cricketer (born 2005)

Personal information
- Full name: Realeanna Margot Ann U Grimmond
- Born: 24 February 2005 (age 21); Guyana
- Batting: Right-handed
- Bowling: Right-arm medium
- Role: All-rounder

International information
- National side: West Indies
- ODI debut (cap 103): 4 June 2025 v England
- Last ODI: 7 June 2025 v England
- ODI shirt no.: 25
- T20I debut (cap 54): 21 May 2025 v England
- Last T20I: 26 May 2025 v England
- T20I shirt no.: 25

Domestic team information
- Years: Team
- 2023–present: Guyana

Career statistics
Competition	WLA	WT20
Matches	16	13
Runs scored	347	153
Batting average	24.78	17.00
100s/50s	0/2	0/0
Top score	72*	46
Balls bowled	6	–
Wickets	0	–
Bowling average	–	–
5 wickets in innings	–	–
10 wickets in match	–	–
Best bowling	–	–
Catches/stumpings	6/–	5/–
- Source: Cricinfo, 21 May 2025

Realeanna Grimmond (born 24 February 2005) is a West Indian cricketer who plays for the West Indies and also plays for Guyana in the Women's Super50 Cup and the Twenty20 Blaze tournaments.

== Career ==
In 2023, She played for Berbice in the GCB Girls U19 Inter-County 30-Overs tournament. Grimmond played for the West Indies Under-19s team in the 2023 Under-19 Women's T20 World Cup.

In June 2024, she was named as captain of Guyana under–19 team at CWI Regional U-19 tournament. In July 2024, she was named in Guyana Amazon Warriors for the 2024 Women's Caribbean Premier League. In 2025, she also captained Berbice in the Guyana Cricket Board's Senior Female Inter-County T20 competition.

In May 2025, she earned maiden call-up for West Indies team for the series against England. She scored a half century (53) on her ODI debut against England on 4 June 2025.
