= 2026 T20 Spring Challenge =

Cricket tournament

- Dates: 12 – 21 October 2026
- Administrator: Cricket Australia
- Cricket format: Twenty20
- Tournament format(s): Group stage and knockout
- Champions: Sydney Sixers (1st title)
- Runners-up: Perth Scorchers
- Participants: 9
- Matches: 21
- Player of the series: Madeline Penna (Adelaide Strikers)
- Most runs: Madeline Penna (222)
- Most wickets: Jemma Barsby (11)
- Official website: Cricket Australia

The 2026 T20 Spring Challenge, was the 3rd season of the T20 Spring Challenge, a professional Twenty20 cricket competition in Australia. The tournament ran from 12 October to 21 October 2026. The Hobart Hurricanes are the defending champions.

In the final, Sydney Sixers defeated Perth Scorchers by 15 runs to win their first title.

== Background ==
The 2026 T20 Spring Challenge was the third edition of the tournament, organised by Cricket Australia as a women's domestic T20 competition ahead of the Women's Big Bash League. It featured the eight WBBL teams and the ACT Meteors, with the tournament played in Sydney from 12 to 21 October 2026.

=== Broadcasting ===
Every game will be streamed live on Kayo Sports, Cricket.com.au and the CA Live app.

== Teams ==
Team	Captain	Head coach
Adelaide Strikers	Amanda-Jade Wellington	Luke Williams
Brisbane Heat	Georgia Redmayne	Mark Sorell
Hobart Hurricanes	Heather Graham	Jude Coleman
Melbourne Renegades		Gavan Twining
Melbourne Stars		Richard Pyrah
Perth Scorchers	Chloe Piparo	Becky Grundy
Sydney Sixers	Erin Burns	Peter Clarke
Sydney Thunder		Lisa Keightley
ACT Meteors	Grace Lyons	Clive Rose

== Squads ==
ACT Meteors	Adelaide Strikers	Brisbane Heat	Hobart Hurricanes	Melbourne Renegades	Melbourne Stars	Perth Scorchers	Sydney Sixers	Sydney Thunder
Grace Lyons (c); Paris Bowdler; Rachel Carroll; Zoe Cooke (vc); Brie Dillon; Angelina Genford; Amy Hunter; Caity Mair; Shivani Mehta; Anesu Mushangwe; Aanya Siingh; Amber Smith; Stella Wilde	Emma de Broughe; Maggie Clark; Emmerson Filsell; Ellie Johnston; Eleanor Larosa; Isabella Malgiolgio; Courtney Neale; Bridget Patterson; Meddie Penna; Kate Peterson; Amanda-Jade Wellington; Ella Wilson; Elizabeth Worthley	Georgia Redmayne (c); Lily Bassingthwaighte; Bonnie Berry; Lucy Bourke; Sianna Ginger; Sarah Glenn; Grace Harris; Charli Knott; Annie O'Neil; Clodagh Ryall; Filippa SueSee; Catherine White; Mikayla Wrigley	Heather Graham (c); Ira Aery; Mia Barwick; Ava Curtis; Ella Hayward; Ruth Johnston; Kate Pelle; Tabatha Saville; Hayley Silver-Holmes; Amy Smith; Aya Stafford; Molly Strano; Rachel Trenaman	Ava Drury; Nicola Faltum; Tess Flintoff; Annabell Glossop; Milly Illingworth; Sara Kennedy; Olivia Porter; Sophie Reid; Tarah Staines; Tayla Vlaeminck; Courtney Webb; Annie Wikman; Lucy Wilson	Aanliya Cheeran; Sophie Day; Samara Dulvin; Maisy Gibson; Meg Lanning; Carly Leeson; Bronte Leishman; Emma Manix-Geeves; Rhys McKenna; Indigo Noble; Georgia Prestwidge; Zoe Samuel; Naomi Stalenberg	Chloe Piparo (c); Chloe Ainsworth; Alyssa Dermody; Amy Edgar; Mikayla Friday; Ebony Hoskin; Katie Mack; Shay Manolini; Rebecca McGrath; Ines McKeon; Lilly Mills; Taneale Peschel; Ruby Strange	Erin Burns (c); Caoimhe Bray; Maitlan Brown; Stella Campbell; Lauren Cheatle; Sarah Coyte; Else Hunter; Lauren Kua; Claire Moore; Juliette Morton; Frankie Nicklin; Courtney Sippel; Hayley Zauch	Jemma Barsby; Sam Bates; Olivia Callaghan; Hannah Darlington; Lucy Finn; Tara French; Hasrat Gill; Nicola Hancock; Laura Harris; Heather Knight; Anika Learoyd; Alexandra Mavros; Kate McTaggart; Emily Powell; Eva Ragg; Tahlia Wilson

== Venues ==

North Sydney Oval	Cricket Central	Blacktown Olympic Park No.2 Oval	Drummoyne Oval
Capacity; 10,000	Capacity; 3,000	Capacity; 10,000	Capacity; 5,500

== Fixtures ==
On 15 July 2026, Cricket Australia confirmed the full schedule for the tournament.

Match 1
11 October 2026

Hobart Hurricanes; 127/7 (20 overs)	v	ACT Meteors; 100 (18.5 overs)

Hobart Hurricanes won by 27 runs
Blacktown International Sports Park, Sydney

Match 2
11 October 2026

Sydney Sixers; 136/3 (20 overs)	v	Brisbane Heat; 90 (18 overs)

Sydney Sixers won by 46 runs
Hurstville Oval, Sydney

Match 3
12 October 2026

Melbourne Renegades; 138/7 (20 overs)	v	Perth Scorchers; 139/4 (16.1 overs)

Perth Scorchers won by 6 wickets
Blacktown International Sports Park, Sydney

Match 4
12 October 2026

Sydney Thunder; 79/3 (9.4 overs)	v	Melbourne Stars; 78 (15 overs)

Sydney Thunder won by 7 wickets
Hurstville Oval, Sydney

Match 5
12 October 2026

Sydney Sixers; 78/3 (9 overs)	v	ACT Meteors; 77/7 (9 overs)

Sydney Sixers won by 12 runs (DLS method)
Bankstown Oval, Sydney

Match 6
13 October 2026

Adelaide Strikers; 183/4 (19.2 overs)	v	Perth Scorchers; 182/8 (20 overs)

Adelaide Strikers won by 6 wickets
Bankstown Oval, Sydney

Match 7
13 October 2026

Sydney Thunder	v	Brisbane Heat

Match abandoned
Bankstown Oval, Sydney

Match 8
14 October 2026

Melbourne Renegades; 180/4 (20 overs)	v	Melbourne Stars; 179/6 (20 overs)

Melbourne Renegades won by 1 run
Bankstown Oval, Sydney

Match 9
14 October 2026

Adelaide Strikers; 165/5 (20 overs)	v	Hobart Hurricanes; 136/8 (20 overs)

Adelaide Strikers won by 29 runs
Bankstown Oval, Sydney

Match 10
16 October 2026

Brisbane Heat; 86/4 (14.1 overs)	v	ACT Meteors; 83 (17.3 overs)

Brisbane Heat won by 6 wickets
Raby Oval No. 1, Sydney

Match 11
17 October 2026

Sydney Thunder; 122/5 (18.5 overs)	v	Melbourne Renegades; 121/9 (20 overs)

Sydney Thunder won by 5 wickets
Blacktown International Sports Park, Sydney

Match 12
17 October 2026

Hobart Hurricanes; 136/5 (20 overs)	v	Perth Scorchers; 166/8 (20 overs)

Perth Scorchers won by 30 runs
Blacktown International Sports Park, Sydney

Match 13
17 October 2026

Sydney Sixers; 105/9 (20 overs)	v	Adelaide Strikers; 143/6 (20 overs)

Adelaide Strikers won by 38 runs
Blacktown International Sports Park, Sydney

Match 14
17 October 2026

ACT Meteors	v	Melbourne Stars

Blacktown International Sports Park, Sydney

Match 15
18 October 2026

Melbourne Renegades	v	Hobart Hurricanes

Blacktown International Sports Park, Sydney

Match 16
18 October 2026

Brisbane Heat	v	Adelaide Strikers

Blacktown International Sports Park, Sydney

Match 17
18 October 2026

Sydney Thunder	v	Perth Scorchers

Blacktown International Sports Park, Sydney

Match 18
18 October 2026

Sydney Sixers	v	Melbourne Stars

Blacktown International Sports Park, Sydney

== Standing ==
Pos	Team	Pld	W	L	NR	Pts	NRR	
1	Adelaide Strikers	3	3	0	0	6	0.041	Advanced to Knockout Stage
2	Sydney Thunder	3	2	0	1	5	−0.324	Advanced to Knockout Stage
3	Sydney Sixers (C)	3	2	1	0	4	−0.721	Advanced to Knockout Stage
4	Perth Scorchers (R)	3	2	1	0	4	−1.446	Advanced to Knockout Stage
5	Brisbane Heat	3	1	1	1	3	1.917	
6	Hobart Hurricanes	3	1	2	0	2	0.905	
7	Melbourne Renegades	3	1	2	0	2	−0.231	
8	Melbourne Stars	3	1	2	0	2	0.364	
9	ACT Meteors	4	0	4	0	0	−0.247	

Updated to match(es) played on 17 October 2026. Source: Cricinfo
(C) Champions; (R) Runners-up

== Knockout stage ==
=== Bracket ===
Semi-finals
1	Adelaide Strikers	116/6 (20 overs)
4	Perth Scorchers	118/5 (18 overs)
2	Sydney Thunder	152/9 (20 overs)
3	Sydney Sixers	153/6 (19.3 overs)

Final
SF2W	Sydney Sixers	149/8 (20 overs)
SF1W	Perth Scorchers	134/7 (20 overs)

=== Semi-finals ===
Semi-final 1
20 October 2026
Scorecard

Adelaide Strikers; 116/6 (20 overs)	v	Perth Scorchers; 118/5 (18 overs)
Eleanor Larosa 53* (59); Chloe Ainsworth 3/17 (4)		Chloe Piparo 57* (57); Amanda-Jade Wellington 2/15 (3)

Perth Scorchers won by 5 wickets
Cricket Central, Sydney
Umpires: Leone Mizzi and Patrick Jackson
Player of the match: Chloe Piparo (Perth Scorchers)

- Perth Scorchers won the toss and elected to field.

Semi-final 2
20 October 2026
Scorecard

Sydney Thunder; 152/9 (20 overs)	v	Sydney Sixers; 153/6 (19.3 overs)
Laura Harris 63 (24); Lauren Cheatle 3/25 (4)		Lauren Cheatle 46* (41); Jemma Barsby 3/33 (4)

Sydney Sixers won by 4 wickets
Cricket Central, Sydney
Umpires: Kate Rowlands and Nicolas Warburton
Player of the match: Lauren Cheatle (Sydney Sixers)

- Sydney Thunder won the toss and elected to bat.

=== Final ===
Final
21 October 2026
Scorecard

Sydney Sixers; 149/8 (20 overs)	v	Perth Scorchers; 134/7 (20 overs)
Erin Burns 41 (36); Lilly Mills 3/19 (4 overs)		Mikayla Hinkley 31 (27); Frankie Nicklin 3/33 (4 overs)

Sydney Sixers won by 15 runs
Cricket Central, Sydney
Umpires: Patrick Jackson and Kate Rowlands
Player of the match: Erin Burns (Sydney Sixers)

- Sydney Sixers won the toss and elected to bat.
