= 2026–27 Women's Big Bash League season =

Cricket tournament

2026–27 Women's Big Bash League
- Dates: 29 October – 5 December 2026
- Administrator: Cricket Australia
- Cricket format: Twenty20
- Tournament format(s): Double round-robin and knockout finals
- Participants: 8
- Matches: 43
- Official website: WBBL

The 2026–27 Women's Big Bash League season or WBBL|12 is the 12th season of the Women's Big Bash League (WBBL). The tournament started on 29 October 2026 and the final is scheduled to be held on 5 December 2026. The Hobart Hurricanes are the defending champions.

== Background ==
The Women's Big Bash League is a professional Women's Twenty20 cricket league held in Australia and organised by Cricket Australia. It was first held in 2015–16, following the creation of the men's league a few years prior, with the 2026–27 season marking its twelfth edition. The eleventh edition was won by the Hobart Hurricanes, who defeated the Perth Scorchers in the final.

=== Format changes ===
Over-rate penalty rules will be changed enforcing full powerplay restrictions on teams who breach the over-rate timer.

=== Schedule ===
On 18 June 2026, Cricket Australia announced the schedule for the 12th season of the Women's Big Bash League. The competition was scheduled to be held from 29 October to 5 December 2026, with the opening match featuring Melbourne Renegades against Sydney Thunder at Junction Oval in Melbourne. The final was scheduled to take place on 5 December 2026.

== Teams ==
Team	Home ground(s)	Captain	Head coach	ref
Adelaide Strikers	Karen Rolton Oval	Tahlia McGrath	Luke Williams	
Brisbane Heat	Allan Border Field	Georgia Redmayne	Mark Sorell	
Hobart Hurricanes	Bellerive Oval	Nicola Carey	Jude Coleman	
Melbourne Renegades	Junction Oval	Sophie Molineux	Gavan Twining	
Melbourne Stars	Junction Oval	Meg Lanning	Richard Pyrah	
Perth Scorchers	WACA Ground	Beth Mooney	Becky Grundy	
Sydney Sixers	North Sydney Oval	Ashleigh Gardner	Peter Clarke	
Sydney Thunder	Drummoyne Oval	Phoebe Litchfield	Lisa Keightley	

=== Personnel changes ===
==== Coaching changes ====
Peter Clarke became the head coach of the Sydney Sixers in July 2026 following Matthew Mott's move to the men's team. Richard Pyrah was announced as the head coach of the Melbourne Stars in August, following Andy Christie's move to assistant coach. That same month, Gavan Twining was announced as the head coach of the Melbourne Renegades.

==== Captaincy changes ====
Previous Hobart Hurricanes captain Elyse Villani announced her retirement from the Women's Big Bash League in December 2025. Jess Jonassen stepped down also as captain in March 2026, but will continue to play.

== Squads ==
Each team is allowed to sign an 15-player squad, including a maximum of 10 players signed before 27 August 2026. Teams are allowed to sign additional replacement players in the instance that one of their players is unavailable. Following the removal of the International Player Draft, teams are able to sign foreign players directly.

Squads contracted for the 2026–27 Women's Big Bash League season
Adelaide Strikers	Brisbane Heat	Hobart Hurricanes	Melbourne Renegades	Melbourne Stars	Perth Scorchers	Sydney Sixers	Sydney Thunder
Tahlia McGrath (c); Maia Bouchier (ENG); ~~Darcie Brown~~; Emma de Broughe; Sophie Ecclestone (ENG); Ellie Johnston; Eleanor Larosa; Bridget Patterson; Madeline Penna; Anesu Mushangwe; Megan Schutt; Amanda-Jade Wellington; Ella Wilson; Laura Wolvaardt (SA)	Georgia Redmayne (c); Lily Bassingthwaighte; Bonnie Berry; Yastika Bhatia (IND); Lucy Bourke; Sianna Ginger; Sarah Glenn (ENG); Lucy Hamilton; Grace Harris; ~~Jess Jonassen~~; Charli Knott; Annie O'Neil; Grace Parsons; Orla Prendergast (IRL); Mikayla Wrigley	Nicola Carey (c); Chamari Athapaththu (SL); Heather Graham; Maddy Green (NZ); Ella Hayward; Chinelle Henry (WIN); Ruth Johnston; Lizelle Lee; Kate Pelle; Hayley Silver-Holmes; Amy Smith; Lauren Smith; Linsey Smith (ENG); Molly Strano; Rachel Trenaman; Callie Wilson; ~~Danni Wyatt-Hodge (ENG)~~	Sophie Molineux (c); Deandra Dottin (WIN); Nicole Faltum; Tess Flintoff; Milly Illingworth; Sara Kennedy; Hayley Matthews (WIN); Olivia Porter; Sophie Reid; Chloe Tryon (SA); Tayla Vlaeminck; Georgia Wareham; Courtney Webb; Lucy Wilson; Annie Wikman	Meg Lanning (c); Sophie Day; Tia Davidge; Charlie Dean (ENG); Kim Garth; Dani Gibson (ENG); Maisy Gibson; Amy Jones (ENG); Carly Leeson; Rhys McKenna; Indigo Noble; Georgia Prestwidge; Zoe Samuel; Naomi Stalenberg; Annabel Sutherland	Beth Mooney (c); Chloe Ainsworth; Sophie Devine (NZ); Amy Edgar; Mikayla Hinkley; Ebony Hoskin; Freya Kemp (ENG); Alana King; Katie Mack; Ines McKeon; Lilly Mills; Chloe Piparo; Taneale Peschel; Fatima Sana (PAK); Ruby Strange	Ashleigh Gardner (c); Caoimhe Bray; Maitlan Brown; Erin Burns; Alice Capsey (ENG); Lauren Cheatle; Sarah Coyte; ~~Maddy Darke~~; Sophia Dunkley (ENG); Elsa Hunter; Amelia Kerr (NZL); Grace Lyons; Frankie Nicklin; Ellyse Perry; Eva Ragg; Courtney Sippel	Phoebe Litchfield (c); Jemma Barsby; Samantha Bates; Lauren Bell (ENG); Hannah Darlington; Nadine de Klerk (SA); Lucy Finn; Hasrat Gill; Nicola Hancock; Laura Harris; Heather Knight (ENG); Anika Learoyd; Claire Moore; Georgia Voll; Tahlia Wilson

As of 29 October 2026

Notes

- Unless otherwise specified, all players are Australian.

=== Replacements ===
- Grace Lyons replaced Maddy Darke due to injury.
- Chamari Athapaththu replaced Danni Wyatt-Hodge due to injury.
- Yastika Bhatia replaced Jess Jonassen due to injury.

== Venues ==
Eight venues were selected to host the tournament.

Adelaide		Brisbane	Hobart
Adelaide Oval	Karen Rolton Oval	Allan Border Field	Bellerive Oval
Capacity; 53,500	Capacity; 5,000	Capacity; 6,500	Capacity; 19,500
2026–27 Women's Big Bash League season is located in Australia
Melbourne	Perth	Sydney	
Junction Oval	WACA Ground	Drummoyne Oval	North Sydney Oval
Capacity; 7,000	Capacity; 10,000	Capacity; 5,500	Capacity; 10,000

== Teams and standings ==
=== Points table ===
Pos	Team	Pld	W	L	NR	Pts	NRR	Qualification
1	Sydney Sixers	8	7	1	0	14	1.063	Advanced to the Final
2	Perth Scorchers	8	6	2	0	12	0.697	Advanced to the Challenger
3	Adelaide Strikers	8	5	3	0	10	0.136	Advanced to the Knockout
4	Brisbane Heat	8	4	4	0	8	0.595	Advanced to the Knockout
5	Melbourne Renegades	8	3	4	1	7	−0.380	
6	Sydney Thunder	8	3	5	0	6	−0.155	
7	Melbourne Stars	8	2	5	1	5	−0.456	
8	Hobart Hurricanes	8	1	7	0	2	−1.499	

Updated to match(es) played on 22 November 2026. Source: Cricinfo

=== League progression ===
Team	Group matches										Playoffs		
Team	1	2	3	4	5	6	7	8	9	10	K	C	F
Adelaide Strikers	2	2	2	4	6	6	8	10	?	?			
Brisbane Heat	0	0	2	4	6	8	8	8	?	?			
Hobart Hurricanes	0	0	0	0	0	0	0	2	?	?			
Melbourne Renegades	0	0	2	4	4	6	6	7	?	?			
Melbourne Stars	2	2	2	2	2	2	4	5	?	?			
Perth Scorchers	2	4	6	8	10	10	12	12	?	?			
Sydney Sixers	2	4	6	8	10	10	12	14	?	?			
Sydney Thunder	2	4	4	4	4	4	6	6	?	?			

Win	Loss	No result

- Note: The total points at the end of each group match are listed.
- Note: Click on the points (group matches) or W/L (playoffs) to see the match summary.

Visitor team →	ADS	BRH	HBH	MLR	MLS	PRS	SYS	SYT
Home team ↓	ADS	BRH	HBH	MLR	MLS	PRS	SYS	SYT
Adelaide Strikers		Heat; 14 runs	Match 40	Strikers; 4 wickets	Strikers; 21 runs		Sixers; 9 wickets	
Brisbane Heat	Strikers; 37 runs		Heat; 4 wickets			Match 39	Sixers; 4 wickets	Thunder; 6 wickets
Hobart Hurricanes	Strikers; 4 wickets	Heat; 10 wickets		Renegades; 4 wickets		Scorchers; 28 runs		Hurricanes; 8 wickets
Melbourne Renegades	Renegades; 36 runs	Match 33			Match 37		Sixers; 11 runs	Thunder; 6 wickets
Melbourne Stars		Heat; 8 runs	Stars; 18 runs	Match abandoned		Scorchers; 18 runs	Sixers; 1 run	
Perth Scorchers	Strikers; 51 runs		Match 36	Scorchers; 9 wickets	Scorchers; 6 wickets			Scorchers; 4 wickets
Sydney Sixers			Sixers; 87 runs	Renegades; 2 wickets	Match 35	Sixers; 4 wickets (DLS)		Sixers; 9 runs (DLS)
Sydney Thunder	Match 34	Thunder; 6 wickets			Stars; 6 runs	Scorchers; 17 runs	Match 38	

Home team won	Visitor team won

- Note: Results listed are according to the home (horizontal) and visitor (vertical) teams.
- Note: Click on a result to see a summary of the match.

=== Win–loss table ===
Below is a summary of results for each team's ten regular season matches, plus finals where applicable, in chronological order. A team's opponent for any given match is listed above the margin of victory/defeat.

Team	1	2	3	4	5	6	7	8	9	10	K	C	F	Pos.
Adelaide; Strikers (ADS)	MLS; 21 runs	BRH; 14 runs	MLR; 36 runs	HBH; 4 wickets	PRS; 51 runs	SYS; 9 wickets	MLR; 5 wickets	BRH; 37 runs						
Brisbane; Heat (BRH)	SYS; 4 wickets	SYT; 6 wickets	ADS; 14 runs	HBH; 4 wickets	MLS; 8 wickets	HBH; 10 wickets	SYT; 6 wickets	ADS; 37 runs						
Hobart; Hurricanes (HBH)	MLS; 18 runs	SYS; 87 runs	MLR; 4 wickets	BRH; 4 wickets	ADS; 4 wickets	BRH; 10 wickets	PRS; 28 runs	SYT; 8 wickets			X	X	X	
Melbourne; Renegades (MLR)	SYT; 6 wickets	PRS; 9 wickets	HBH; 4 wickets	ADS; 36 runs	SYS; 11 runs	SYS; 2 wickets	ADS; 5 wickets	MLS; N/R						
Melbourne; Stars (MLS)	HBH; 18 runs	ADS; 21 runs	PRS; 15 runs	SYS; 1 run	PRS; 6 wickets	BRH; 8 wickets	SYT; 6 runs	MLR; N/R						
Perth; Scorchers (PRS)	MLR; 9 wickets	MLS; 15 runs	SYT; 17 runs	MLS; 6 wickets	SYT; 4 wickets	ADS; 51 runs	HBH; 28 runs	SYS; 4 wickets (DLS)						
Sydney; Sixers (SYS)	BRH; 4 wickets	HBH; 87 runs	MLS; 1 run	SYT; 9 runs (DLS)	MLR; 11 runs	MLR; 2 wickets	ADS; 9 wickets	PRS; 4 wickets (DLS)						
Sydney; Thunder (SYT)	MLR; 6 wickets	BRH; 6 wickets	PRS; 17 runs	SYS; 9 runs (DLS)	PRS; 4 wickets	MLS; 6 runs	BRH; 6 wickets	HBH; 8 wickets						

Team's results→	Won	Tied	Lost	N/R

== League stage ==
On 2 July 2026, Cricket Australia confirmed the full schedule for the tournament.

Match 1
29 October 2026
15:40
Scorecard

Melbourne Renegades (H); 9/138 (20 overs)	v	Sydney Thunder; 4/140 (17 overs)
Hayley Matthews 45 (30); Georgia Voll 4/26 (4 overs)		Anika Learoyd 48 (37); Tayla Vlaeminck 2/23 (4 overs)

Sydney Thunder won by 6 wickets
Junction Oval, Melbourne
Umpires: Clare Haysom and Bede Sajowitz
Player of the match: Georgia Voll (Sydney Thunder)

- Sydney Thunder won the toss and elected to field.

Match 2
29 October 2026
19:10 (N)
Scorecard

Melbourne Stars (H); 4/192 (20 overs)	v	Hobart Hurricanes; 8/174 (20 overs)
Meg Lanning 71 (52); Heather Graham 2/31 (4 overs)		Lizelle Lee 57 (33); Annabel Sutherland 3/34 (4 overs)

Melbourne Stars won by 18 runs
Junction Oval, Melbourne
Umpires: Clare Haysom and Bede Sajowitz
Player of the match: Annabel Sutherland (Melbourne Stars)

- Hobart Hurricanes won the toss and elected to field.

Match 3
30 October 2026
19:10 (N)
Scorecard

Brisbane Heat (H); 5/154 (20 overs)	v	Sydney Sixers; 6/157 (20 overs)
Georgia Redmayne 58 (44); Ashleigh Gardner 2/25 (4 overs)		Ellyse Perry 58 (38); Charli Knott 2/25 (3 overs)

Sydney Sixers won by 4 wickets
Allan Border Field, Brisbane
Umpires: Nathan James and Kylie White
Player of the match: Ellyse Perry (Sydney Sixers)

- Sydney Sixers won the toss and elected to field.

Match 4
31 October 2026
15:40
Scorecard

Adelaide Strikers (H); 2/185 (20 overs)	v	Melbourne Stars; 7/164 (20 overs)
Laura Wolvaardt 70 (50); Kim Garth 1/27 (4 overs)		Rhys McKenna 40 (31); Amanda-Jade Wellington 3/28 (4 overs)

Adelaide Strikers won by 21 runs
Karen Rolton Oval, Adelaide
Umpires: Dhaval Bhatt and Kurt Miegel
Player of the match: Amanda-Jade Wellington (Adelaide Strikers)

- Melbourne Stars won the toss and elected to field.

Match 5
31 October 2026
19:10 (D/N)
Scorecard

Perth Scorchers (H); 6/136 (20 overs)	v	Melbourne Renegades; 1/138 (13.3 overs)
Georgia Wareham 62 (39); Chloe Ainsworth 2/22 (4 overs)		Beth Mooney 58* (40); Tayla Vlaeminck 1/29 (4 overs)

Perth Scorchers won by 9 wickets
WACA Ground, Perth
Player of the match: Beth Mooney (Perth Scorchers)

- Perth Scorchers won the toss and elected to field.

Match 6
1 November 2026
15:40
Scorecard

Brisbane Heat; 5/178 (20 overs)	v	Sydney Thunder (H); 4/180 (16.4 overs)
Grace Harris 58 (37); Georgia Voll 2/25 (3 overs)		Heather Knight 54* (29); Lily Bassingthwaighte 2/31 (3.4 overs)

Sydney Thunder won by 6 wickets
Drummoyne Oval, Sydney
Player of the match: Heather Knight (Sydney Thunder)

- Brisbane Heat won the toss and elected to bat.

Match 7
1 November 2026
19:10 (N)
Scorecard

Sydney Sixers (H); 8/196 (20 overs)	v	Hobart Hurricanes; 109 (17.4 overs)
Ashleigh Gardner 124 (60); Nicola Carey 3/31 (4 overs)		Maddy Green 42* (33); Ashleigh Gardner 3/23 (3 overs)

Sydney Sixers won by 87 runs
Drummoyne Oval, Sydney
Umpires: Patrick Jackson and Sharad Patel
Player of the match: Ashleigh Gardner (Sydney Sixers)

- Hobart Hurricanes won the toss and elected to field.

Match 8
2 November 2026
19:10 (N)
Scorecard

Perth Scorchers; 9/124 (20 overs)	v	Melbourne Stars (H); 109 (18.1 overs)
Alana King 18 (21); Maisy Gibson 2/10 (3 overs)		Meg Lanning 41 (36); Sophie Devine 4/19 (4 overs)

Perth Scorchers won by 15 runs
Junction Oval, Melbourne
Umpires: Chris Grant and Louise Broadfoot
Player of the match: Sophie Devine (Perth Scorchers)

- Melbourne Stars won the toss and elected to field.

Match 9
4 November 2026
19:10 (N)
Scorecard

Hobart Hurricanes (H); 7/154 (20 overs)	v	Melbourne Renegades; 6/155 (19.5 overs)
Nicola Carey 62 (43); Sophie Molineux 4/22 (4 overs)		Hayley Matthews 59 (44); Heather Graham 3/24 (4 overs)

Melbourne Renegades won by 4 wickets
Bellerive Oval, Hobart
Umpires: Sam Burns and Simon Burns
Player of the match: Sophie Molineux (Melbourne Renegades)

- Melbourne Renegades won the toss and elected to field.

Match 10
5 November 2026
15:40
Scorecard

Brisbane Heat; 4/184 (20 overs)	v	Adelaide Strikers (H); 5/170 (20 overs)
Charli Knott 104 (61); Sophie Ecclestone 1/18 (4 overs)		Laura Wolvaardt 75 (48); Grace Harris 2/19 (2 overs)

Brisbane Heat won by 14 runs
Drummoyne Oval, Sydney
Umpires: Mitchell Claydon and Sharad Patel
Player of the match: Charli Knott (Brisbane Heat)

- Adelaide Strikers won the toss and elected to field.

Match 11
5 November 2026
19:10 (N)
Scorecard

Perth Scorchers; 3/183 (20 overs)	v	Sydney Thunder (H); 166 (19 overs)
Beth Mooney 80* (55); Jemma Barsby 1/18 (3 overs)		Phoebe Litchfield 34 (19); Alana King 4/35 (4 overs)

Perth Scorchers won by 17 runs
Drummoyne Oval, Sydney
Umpires: Roberto Howard and Sharad Patel
Player of the match: Beth Mooney (Perth Scorchers)

- Sydney Thunder won the toss and elected to field.

Match 12
6 November 2026
19:10 (N)
Scorecard

Sydney Sixers; 5/160 (20 overs)	v	Melbourne Stars (H); 7/159 (20 overs)
Ellyse Perry 84* (57); Maisy Gibson 1/18 (2 overs)		Dani Gibson 31 (20); Ellyse Perry 1/5 (1 over)

Sydney Sixers won by 1 run
Junction Oval, Melbourne
Umpires: Chris Grant and Clare Haysom
Player of the match: Ellyse Perry (Sydney Sixers)

- Sydney Sixers won the toss and elected to bat.

Match 13
7 November 2026
15:40
Scorecard

Melbourne Renegades (H); 3/188 (20 overs)	v	Adelaide Strikers; 8/152 (20 overs)
Georgia Wareham 73* (31); Anesu Mushangwe 1/21 (2 overs)		Maia Bouchier 54 (38); Milly Illingworth 3/29 (3 overs)

Melbourne Renegades won by 36 runs
Junction Oval, Melbourne
Umpires: Chris Grant and Malcolm Wood
Player of the match: Georgia Wareham (Melbourne Renegades)

- Adelaide Strikers won the toss and elected to field.

Match 14
7 November 2026
19:10 (N)
Scorecard

Hobart Hurricanes; 9/116 (20 overs)	v	Brisbane Heat (H); 6/119 (18.2 overs)
Rachel Trenaman 25 (33); Lily Bassingthwaighte 3/16 (4 overs)		Annie O'Neil 32* (28); Heather Graham 2/20 (4 overs)

Brisbane Heat won by 4 wickets
Allan Border Field, Brisbane
Umpires: Kylie White and Riki Wessels
Player of the match: Lily Bassingthwaighte (Brisbane Heat)

- Brisbane Heat won the toss and elected to field.

Match 15
8 November 2026
13:40
Scorecard

Sydney Sixers (H); 2/162 (16 overs)	v	Sydney Thunder; 158 (15.3 overs)
Ashleigh Gardner 64* (25); Lauren Bell 1/26 (3 overs)		Laura Harris 35 (10); Caoimhe Bray 4/28 (4 overs)

Sydney Sixers won by 9 runs (DLS method)
North Sydney Oval, Sydney
Umpires: Mitchell Claydon and Roberto Howard
Player of the match: Ashleigh Gardner (Sydney Sixers)

- Sydney Thunder won the toss and elected to field.
- Match was reduced to 16 overs per side due to rain.
- Sydney Thunder were set a revised target of 168 runs.

Match 16
8 November 2026
17:10 (D/N)
Scorecard

Melbourne Stars; 6/136 (20 overs)	v	Perth Scorchers (H); 4/137 (15 overs)
Meg Lanning 56 (46); Sophie Devine 2/18 (3 overs)		Sophie Devine 55 (24); Sophie Day 2/34 (4 overs)

Perth Scorchers won by 6 wickets
North Sydney Oval, Sydney
Umpires: Mitchell Claydon and Roberto Howard
Player of the match: Sophie Devine (Perth Scorchers)

- Melbourne Stars won the toss and elected to bat.

Match 17
10 November 2026
19:10 (N)
Scorecard

Hobart Hurricanes (H); 5/138 (20 overs)	v	Adelaide Strikers; 6/139 (20 overs)
Nicola Carey 66* (53); Madeline Penna 1/14 (1 over)		Emma de Broughe 41 (37); Lauren Smith 2/6 (2 overs)

Adelaide Strikers won by 4 wickets
Bellerive Oval, Hobart
Umpires: Sam Burns and Simon Burns
Player of the match: Emma de Broughe (Adelaide Strikers)

- Adelaide Strikers won the toss and elected to field.

Match 18
11 November 2026
19:10 (D/N)
Scorecard

Sydney Thunder; 5/159 (20 overs)	v	Perth Scorchers (H); 6/160 (18.3 overs)
Heather Knight 71 (46); Chloe Ainsworth 1/22 (3 overs)		Sophie Devine 37 (32); Jemma Barsby 1/19 (2 overs)

Perth Scorchers won by 4 wickets
WACA Ground, Perth
Umpires: Ahmad Khan and Lauren McGill
Player of the match: Heather Knight (Sydney Thunder)

- Sydney Thunder won the toss and elected to bat.

Match 19
12 November 2026
15:40
Scorecard

Melbourne Stars (H); 5/165 (20 overs)	v	Brisbane Heat; 2/166 (18.5 overs)
Amy Jones 74 (52); Sianna Ginger 2/22 (3 overs)		Georgia Redmayne 74* (50); Annabel Sutherland 1/32 (4 overs)

Brisbane Heat won by 8 wickets
Junction Oval, Melbourne
Umpires: Louise Broadfoot and Malcolm Wood
Player of the match: Georgia Redmayne (Brisbane Heat)

- Melbourne Stars won the toss and elected to bat.

Match 20
12 November 2026
19:10 (N)
Scorecard

Sydney Sixers; 6/140 (20 overs)	v	Melbourne Renegades (H); 129 (20 overs)
Melie Kerr 53 (34); Milly Illingworth 2/24 (3 overs)		Tess Flintoff 44 (31); Ashleigh Gardner 3/13 (3 overs)

Sydney Sixers won by 11 runs
Junction Oval, Melbourne
Umpires: Louise Broadfoot and Malcolm Wood
Player of the match: Melie Kerr (Sydney Sixers)

- Sydney Sixers won the toss and elected to bat.

Match 21
14 November 2026
15:40
Scorecard

Hobart Hurricanes (H); 86 (17.5 overs)	v	Brisbane Heat; 0/88 (5.4 overs)
Lauren Smith 20 (20); Lily Bassingthwaighte 3/25 (4 overs)		Grace Harris 52* (22)

Brisbane Heat won by 10 wickets
Bellerive Oval, Hobart
Umpires: Muhammad Qureshi and Simon Burns
Player of the match: Lily Bassingthwaighte (Brisbane Heat)

- Brisbane Heat won the toss and elected to field.

Match 22
14 November 2026
19:10 (D/N)
Scorecard

Adelaide Strikers; 4/202 (20 overs)	v	Perth Scorchers (H); 9/151 (20 overs)
Laura Wolvaardt 83* (45); Chloe Ainsworth 1/23 (4 overs)		Mikayla Hinkley 41 (30); Anesu Mushangwe 5/11 (4 overs)

Adelaide Strikers won by 51 runs
WACA Ground, Perth
Umpires: Jarryd Buscall and Peta Merrilees
Player of the match: Anesu Mushangwe (Adelaide Strikers)

- Adelaide Strikers won the toss and elected to bat.

Match 23
15 November 2026
11:00
Scorecard

Sydney Sixers (H); 6/152 (20 overs)	v	Melbourne Renegades; 8/156 (20 overs)
Ashleigh Gardner 55 (31); Georgia Wareham 3/19 (4 overs)		Chloe Tryon 43 (23); Ashleigh Gardner 4/33 (4 overs)

Melbourne Renegades won by 2 wickets
North Sydney Oval, Sydney
Umpires: Kate Rowlands and Patrick Jackson
Player of the match: Chloe Tryon (Melbourne Renegades)

- Melbourne Renegades won the toss and elected to field.

Match 24
16 November 2026
19:10 (N)
Scorecard

Melbourne Stars; 8/120 (20 overs)	v	Sydney Thunder (H); 114 (19.3 overs)
Meg Lanning 28 (23); Nicola Hancock 4/17 (4 overs)		Anika Learoyd 33 (42); Georgia Prestwidge 5/25 (4 overs)

Melbourne Stars won by 6 runs
Drummoyne Oval, Sydney
Umpires: Kate Rowlands and Patrick Jackson
Player of the match: Georgia Prestwidge (Melbourne Stars)

- Sydney Thunder won the toss and elected to field.

Match 25
17 November 2026
19:10 (N)
Scorecard

Adelaide Strikers (H); 124 (18.1 overs)	v	Sydney Sixers; 1/126 (15 overs)
Laura Wolvaardt 37 (26); Melie Kerr 3/23 (4 overs)		Sophia Dunkley 72 (44); Megan Schutt 1/20 (3 overs)

Sydney Sixers won by 9 wickets
Karen Rolton Oval, Adelaide
Umpires: James Cushway and Peter George
Player of the match: Sophia Dunkley (Sydney Sixers)

- Adelaide Strikers won the toss and elected to bat.

Match 26
19 November 2026
15:40
Scorecard

Perth Scorchers; 148 (19.3 overs)	v	Hobart Hurricanes (H); 120 (17.3 overs)
Freya Kemp 40 (20); Nicola Carey 3/14 (3.3 overs)		Maddy Green 51 (32); Chloe Ainsworth 4/27 (4 overs)

Perth Scorchers won by 28 runs
Allan Border Field, Brisbane
Umpires: Benjamin Farrell and Stephen Dionysius
Player of the match: Chloe Ainsworth (Perth Scorchers)

- Hobart Hurricanes won the toss and elected to field.

Match 27
19 November 2026
19:10 (N)
Scorecard

Brisbane Heat (H); 3/225 (20 overs)	v	Sydney Thunder; 4/226 (19.2 overs)
Grace Harris 121* (67); Samantha Bates 3/33 (4 overs)		Laura Harris 63* (20); Sianna Ginger 2/45 (4 overs)

Sydney Thunder won by 6 wickets
Allan Border Field, Brisbane
Umpires: Nathan James and Stephen Dionysius
Player of the match: Laura Harris (Sydney Thunder)

- Sydney Thunder won the toss and elected to field.

Match 28
20 November 2026
19:10 (N)
Scorecard

Melbourne Renegades; 4/165 (20 overs)	v	Adelaide Strikers (H); 5/168 (19.5 overs)
Sophie Molineux 63* (38); Tahlia McGrath 1/24 (3 overs)		Laura Wolvaardt 91 (58); Georgia Wareham 2/17 (4 overs)

Adelaide Strikers won by 5 wickets
Adelaide Oval, Adelaide
Umpires: Ali Cheema and Eloise Sheridan
Player of the match: Laura Wolvaardt (Adelaide Strikers)

- Adelaide Strikers won the toss and elected to field.

Match 29
21 November 2026
12:00
Scorecard

Sydney Thunder; 5/150 (20 overs)	v	Hobart Hurricanes (H); 2/151 (15.1 overs)
Nadine de Klerk 36* (26); Linsey Smith 3/19 (3 overs)		Rachel Trenaman 55* (33); Jemma Barsby 3/24 (3.1 overs)

Hobart Hurricanes won by 8 wickets
Bellerive Oval, Hobart
Umpires: Jason Shelton and Scolyer
Player of the match: Linsey Smith (Hobart Hurricanes)

- Hobart Hurricanes won the toss and elected to field.

Match 30
21 November 2026
15:30
Scorecard

Perth Scorchers; 7/142 (20 overs)	v	Sydney Sixers; 6/120 (14.5 overs)
Freya Kemp 43 (30); Ashleigh Gardner 3/24 (4 overs)		Sophia Dunkley 54 (29); Sophie Devine 2/22 (2.5 overs)

Sydney Sixers won by 4 wickets (DLS method)
North Sydney Oval, Sydney
Umpires: Jeff Egan and Mitchell Claydon
Player of the match: Sophia Dunkley (Sydney Sixers)

- Sydney Sixers won the toss and elected to field.
- Sydney Sixers were set a revised target of 120 runs from 16 overs due to rain.

Match 31
22 November 2026
15:40
Scorecard

Adelaide Strikers; 4/179 (20 overs)	v	Brisbane Heat (H); 9/142 (20 overs)
Tahlia McGrath 64 (36); Lily Bassingthwaighte 2/32 (4 overs)		Yastika Bhatia 35* (23); Anesu Mushangwe 4/23 (3 overs)

Adelaide Strikers won by 37 runs
Allan Border Field, Brisbane
Player of the match: Tahlia McGrath (Adelaide Strikers)

- Brisbane Heat won the toss and elected to field.

Match 32
22 November 2026
19:10 (N)
Scorecard

Melbourne Stars (H); 7/159 (20 overs)	v	Melbourne Renegades; 0/28 (3 overs)
Amy Jones 57 (43); Hayley Matthews 2/20 (3 overs)		Tess Flintoff 14* (9)

No result
Junction Oval, Melbourne
Umpires: Clare Haysom and Louise Broadfoot

- Melbourne Stars won the toss and elected to bat.
- No further play was possible due to rain.

Match 33
25 November 2026
19:10 (N)
Scorecard

Melbourne Renegades (H)	v	Brisbane Heat

Junction Oval, Melbourne

Match 34
26 November 2026
15:40
Scorecard

Sydney Thunder (H)	v	Adelaide Strikers

North Sydney Oval, Sydney

Match 35
26 November 2026
19:10 (N)
Scorecard

Sydney Sixers (H)	v	Melbourne Stars

North Sydney Oval, Sydney

Match 36
27 November 2026
21:10 (D/N)
Scorecard

Perth Scorchers (H)	v	Hobart Hurricanes

WACA Ground, Perth

Match 37
28 November 2026
15:40
Scorecard

Melbourne Renegades (H)	v	Melbourne Stars

Junction Oval, Melbourne

Match 38
28 November 2026
19:10 (N)
Scorecard

Sydney Thunder (H)	v	Sydney Sixers

Drummoyne Oval, Sydney

Match 39
29 November 2026
12:00
Scorecard

Brisbane Heat (H)	v	Perth Scorchers

Karen Rolton Oval, Adelaide

Match 40
29 November 2026
15:30
Scorecard

Adelaide Strikers (H)	v	Hobart Hurricanes

Karen Rolton Oval, Adelaide

== Knockout stage ==
Knockout
3	3rd placed team
4	4th placed team

Challenger
2	2nd placed team
KW	Winner of Knockout

The Final
1	1st placed team
CW	Winner of Challenger

=== Knockout ===
1 December 2026
19:10
Scorecard

3rd placed team	v	4th placed team

TBD

=== Challenger ===
3 December 2026
Scorecard

2nd placed team	v	Winner of Knockout

TBD

=== The Final ===
5 December 2026
15:30
Scorecard

1st placed team	v	Winner of Challenger

TBD

== Statistics ==
As of 22 November 2026

Most runs
Runs	Player	Team
439	Laura Wolvaardt	Adelaide Strikers
331	Charli Knott	Brisbane Heat
326	Meg Lanning	Melbourne Stars
321	Ashleigh Gardner	Sydney Sixers
293	Grace Harris	Brisbane Heat

Most wickets
Wickets	Player	Team
20	Ashleigh Gardner	Sydney Sixers
14	Sophie Devine	Perth Scorchers
12	Alana King	Perth Scorchers
12	Melie Kerr	Sydney Sixers
11	Chloe Ainsworth	Perth Scorchers

== Media coverage ==
All 43 matches of WBBL|12 will be broadcast on Kayo Sports and Foxtel, with 20 matches exclusive to Fox Cricket. In addition, 20 regular-season matches and all finals will be broadcast live and free-to-air on Seven Network and streamed on 7plus.

=== Broadcasting ===
The broadcasting rights for the Women's Big Bash League were held by Foxtel and the Seven Network under agreement with Cricket Australia running until the 2030–31 season. Foxtel broadcast matches through Fox Cricket and streamed them on Kayo Sports, while the Seven Network provided free-to-air television coverage of selected matches, with streaming available on 7plus.

List of broadcaster
Countries	Television rights	Streaming rights
Australia	Fox Cricket; Seven Network	Kayo Sports; 7plus
South Asia	Star Sports	FanCode
New Zealand	Sky Sport NZ	Sky Sport Now
United Kingdom	Sky Sports	TNT Sports via Discovery+
Ireland	Sky Sports	TNT Sports via Discovery+
Caribbean	SportsMax	
United States	Willow	Cricbuzz
Canada	Willow	Cricbuzz
South Africa	SuperSport	—N/a
Pacific Islands	Pacific TV	

=== Match reports ===
Match reports
Match	Teams	Reports	
Match	Teams	Cricinfo	Cricket Australia
1	Melbourne Renegades vs Sydney Thunder	Voll stars with ball to set up Sydney Thunder victory	Thunder kick off WBBL12 with comfortable win over 'Gades
2	Melbourne Stars vs Hobart Hurricanes	Lanning and Sutherland power Melbourne Stars to opening win	Stars knock off reigning champs under Junction lights
3	Brisbane Heat vs Sydney Sixers	Perry, Coyte help Sixers seal a final ball thriller over Heat	Nerves of steel Sixers sink gallant Heat in last-ball thriller
4	Adelaide Strikers vs Melbourne Stars	—	Scary-good Strikers blitz Stars on action-packed Halloween
5	Perth Scorchers vs Melbourne Renegades	—	Scorchers pummel wasteful 'Gades as skippers new and old star
6	Sydney Thunder vs Brisbane Heat	Litchfield, Laura Harris and Knight blaze away to continue Heat's drought	Fast-finishing Thunder outmuscle Heat as Harris sisters go big
7	Sydney Sixers vs Hobart Hurricanes	Gardner's 124 diffuses Hurricanes as Sixers script stunning comeback win	Centurion Gardner's epic heroics blast 'Canes off the park
8	Melbourne Stars vs Perth Scorchers	Sophie Devine four-for seals low-scoring encounter for Scorchers	Devine, King star with the ball as miserly Scorchers upend Stars
9	Hobart Hurricanes vs Melbourne Renegades	No-ball drama hands Renegades last-ball win against Hurricanes	Rare rule hands Renegades thrilling win over Hurricanes
10	Adelaide Strikers vs Brisbane Heat	Charli Knott's 61-ball 104 ends Brisbane Heat's 706-day winless streak in the WBBL	Brisbane's back: Heat snap 706-day WBBL drought
11	Sydney Thunder vs Perth Scorchers	Mooney, Devine, King power Scorchers past Thunder	King and Mooney lead Scorchers to top of the table
12	Melbourne Stars vs Sydney Sixers	—	Wily Coyte does it again as Sixers sink Stars in one-run thriller
13	Melbourne Renegades vs Adelaide Strikers	—	Wareham wows to set up Renegades' victory over Strikers
14	Brisbane Heat vs Hobart Hurricanes	—	Two on the trot for Heat, as Hurricanes remain winless
15	Sydney Sixers vs Sydney Thunder	—	Gardner explodes before Sixers teen takes stunner
16	Perth Scorchers vs Melbourne Stars	—	Devine, Mooney help Scorchers stay unbeaten in WBBL12
17	Hobart Hurricanes vs Adelaide Strikers	Defending champions Hurricanes on brink of elimination after last-ball heartbreak	Ecclestone's last-ball heroics leave Hurricanes' finals hopes in tatters
18	Perth Scorchers vs Sydney Thunder	Scorchers stay unbeaten despite Knight's blitz	Valiant Knight no match for stellar undefeated Scorchers
19	Melbourne Stars vs Brisbane Heat	Redmayne's unbeaten 74 caps Heat's third win in a row	Brisbane on a WBBL12 heater after Redmayne ambush
20	Melbourne Renegades vs Sydney Sixers	—	Melie masterclass guides Sydney Sixers to fifth WBBL12 win
21	Hobart Hurricanes vs Brisbane Heat	Harris leads Brisbane Heat to victory in record time	Hard-hitting Harris helps Heat hammer hapless Hobart
22	Perth Scorchers vs Adelaide Strikers	Wolvaardt, Penna, Mushangwe end Scorchers' winning streak	Mighty Mushangwe helps Strikers spoil Perth's perfect record
23	Sydney Sixers vs Melbourne Renegades	Tryon helps Renegades to vital last-ball victory	Renegades snatch vital win to end Sixers' unbeaten run
24	Sydney Thunder vs Melbourne Stars	—	Dean stunner seals incredible Melbourne Stars comeback
25	Adelaide Strikers vs Sydney Sixers	Dunkley's onslaught keeps Sixers top of the table	Delightful Dunkley leads Sydney's perfect Adelaide ambush
26	Hobart Hurricanes vs Perth Scorchers	Ainsworth overcomes illness to continue Hurricanes' miserable season	Young quick stars as Scorchers overcome Hurricanes scare
27	Brisbane Heat vs Sydney Thunder	Laura Harris wins family battle with record-breaking 15-ball fifty	Spectacular Harris achieves impossible chase, breaks records
28	Adelaide Strikers vs Melbourne Renegades	—	Wolvaardt's WBBL best gets Strikers home in final over

== See also ==
- 2026–27 Big Bash League season
