= 2025 T20 Spring Challenge =

Cricket tournament

- Dates: 21 – 30 October 2025
- Administrator: Cricket Australia
- Cricket format: Twenty20
- Tournament format(s): Group stage and knockout
- Champions: Hobart Hurricanes (2nd title)
- Runners-up: Brisbane Heat
- Participants: 9
- Matches: 21
- Player of the series: Maitlan Brown (Sydney Sixers); Madeline Penna (Adelaide Strikers)
- Most runs: Madeline Penna (Adelaide Strikers) (229)
- Most wickets: Molly Strano (Hobart Hurricanes (10); Callie Wilson (Hobart Hurricanes) (10)
- Official website: Cricket Australia

The 2025 T20 Spring Challenge was the second season of the T20 Spring Challenge, a professional Twenty20 cricket competition in Australia. The tournament was played from 21 to 30 October 2025. The Hobart Hurricanes are the defending champions.

In the final, Hobart Hurricanes defeated Brisbane Heat by 88 runs to win the title.

== Background ==
The 2025 T20 Spring Challenge was the second edition of the tournament, organised by Cricket Australia as a women's domestic T20 competition ahead of the Women's Big Bash League. It featured the eight WBBL teams and the ACT Meteors, with the tournament played in Sydney from 21 to 30 October 2025.

=== Broadcasting ===
All the games were streamed on Kayo Sports, cricket.com.au and the CA Live app.

== Teams and Squads ==
ACT Meteors	Adelaide Strikers	Brisbane Heat	Hobart Hurricanes	Melbourne Renegades	Melbourne Stars	Perth Scorchers	Sydney Sixers	Sydney Thunder
Head Coaches
Erin Osborne			Jude Coleman					
Captains
		Charli Knott	Elyse Villani	Courtney Webb				Tahlia Wilson
Players
Paris Bowdler; Rachel Carroll; Zoe Cooke; Grace Dignam; Holly Ferling; Angelina Genford; Amy Hunter; Carly Leeson; Grace Lyons; Shivani Mehta; Olivia Porter; Gabrielle Sutcliffe; Annie Wikman		Lily Bassingthwaite; Bonnie Berry; Lucinda Bourke, Sianna Ginger, Lucy Hamilton, Nicola Hancock, Charli Knott (c), Annie O'Neil, Georgia Redmayne, Clodagh Ryall, Ayaka Stafford, Filippa SueSee, Mikayla Wrigley	Mia Barwick; Nicola Carey (vc); Ava Curtis; Ruth Johnston; Lizelle Lee; Caitlyn Mair; Tabatha Saville; Hayley Silver-Holmes; Lauren Smith; Molly Strano; Rachel Trenaman; Elyse Villani; Callie Wilson	Charis Bekker, Sarah Coyte, Emma de Broughe, Samara Dulvin, Nicole Faltum, Tess Flintoff, Olivia Henry, Milly Illingworth, Charli McLennan, Jasmine Nevins, Zoe Samuel, Naomi Stalenberg, Courtney Webb (c)	Sophie Day, Maisy Gibson, Dani Gibson (OS), Ella Hayward, Jasmine Kamboj, Meg Lanning, Rhys McKenna, Ines McKeon, Sasha Moloney, Indigo Noble, Mia Perrin, Georgia Prestwidge, Sophie Reid	Chloe Ainsworth, Maddy Darke, Amy Edgar, Mikayla Hinkley, Ebony Hoskin, Katie Mack, Shay Manolini, Rebecca McGrath, Lilly Mills, Chloe Piparo, Paige Scholfield (OS), Ruby Strange, Maddie White	Caoimhe Bray; Maitlan Brown; Mathilda Carmichael, Lucy Finn, Elsa Hunter, Lauren Kua, Emma Manix-Geeves, Claire Moore, Frankie Nicklin, Kate Pelle, Courtney Sippel	Samantha Bates; Ella Briscoe; Stella Campbell; Tara French; Hasrat Gill, Laura Harris, Anika Learoyd, Alexandra Mavros, Olivia Maxwell, Taneale Peschel, Eva Ragg, Tahlia Wilson (c)

== Venues ==

North Sydney Oval	Cricket Central	Blacktown Olympic Park No.2 Oval	Drummoyne Oval
Capacity; 10,000	Capacity; 3,000	Capacity; 10,000	Capacity; 5,500

== Standings ==
Pos	Team	Pld	W	L	NR	Pts	NRR	
1	Hobart Hurricanes	4	3	1	0	6	0.910	Advanced to Knockout Stage
2	Brisbane Heat	4	3	1	0	6	0.849	Advanced to Knockout Stage
3	Melbourne Renegades	4	3	1	0	6	0.848	Advanced to Knockout Stage
4	Perth Scorchers	4	3	1	0	6	0.595	Advanced to Knockout Stage
5	Sydney Sixers	4	2	2	0	4	−0.159	Eliminated
6	Sydney Thunder	4	2	2	0	4	−0.394	Eliminated
7	ACT Meteors	4	1	3	0	2	−0.163	Eliminated
8	Adelaide Strikers	4	1	3	0	2	−0.619	Eliminated
9	Melbourne Stars	4	0	4	0	0	−1.736	Eliminated

Source: ESPNcricinfo

== Fixtures ==
On 14 July 2025, Cricket Australia confirmed the full schedule for the tournament.

21 October 2025
10:00 UTC+11
Scorecard

Hobart Hurricanes; 7/143 (20 overs)	v	Sydney Sixers; 4/144 (19 overs)
Nicola Carey 60 (50); Frankie Nicklin 2/25 (4 overs)		Kate Pelle 38 (38); Molly Strano 2/33 (4 overs)

Sydney Sixers won by 6 wickets
North Sydney Oval, Sydney
Umpires: Patrick Jackson and Lauren McGill
Player of the match: Maitlan Brown (Sydney Sixers)

- Sydney Sixers won the toss and elected to field.

21 October 2025
10:00 UTC+11
Scorecard

Melbourne Renegades; 85 (14.5 overs)	v	Brisbane Heat; 7/88 (19.1 overs)
Naomi Stalenberg 28 (23); Bonnie Berry 4/19 (2.5 overs)		Mikayla Wrigley 30 (32); Sarah Coyte 2/5 (3 overs)

Brisbane Heat won by 3 wickets
Cricket Central, Sydney
Umpires: Elizabeth O'Dwyer and Kate Rowlands
Player of the match: Bonnie Berry (Brisbane Heat)

- Brisbane Heat won the toss and elected to field.

21 October 2025
14:30 UTC+11
Scorecard

ACT Meteors; 127 (19.1 overs)	v	Sydney Thunder; 6/130 (18.3 overs)
Annie Wikman 40 (37); Samantha Bates 3/18 (3.1 overs)		Laura Harris 48* (20); Gabby Sutcliffe 2/20 (4 overs)

Sydney Thunder won by 4 wickets
North Sydney Oval, Sydney
Umpires: Lauren McGill and Leone Mizzi
Player of the match: Laura Harris (Sydney Thunder)

- ACT Meteors won the toss and elected to bat.

21 October 2025
14:30 UTC+11
Scorecard

Melbourne Stars; 5/143 (20 overs)	v	Adelaide Strikers; 3/144 (18.4 overs)
Meg Lanning 70 (51); Eleanor Larosa 2/23 (2 overs)		Madeline Penna 48* (38); Sasha Moloney 2/25 (4 overs)

Adelaide Strikers won by 7 wickets
Cricket Central, Sydney
Umpires: Elizabeth O'Dwyer and Kate Rowlands
Player of the match: Madeline Penna (Adelaide Strikers)

- Adelaide Strikers won the toss and elected to field.

22 October 2025
10:00 UTC+11
Scorecard

Sydney Sixers; 127 (20 overs)	v	Perth Scorchers; 5/128 (18.3 overs)
Caoimhe Bray 23 (21); Lilly Mills 3/24 (4 overs)		Maddy Darke 75* (48); Maitlan Brown 3/27 (4 overs)

Perth Scorchers won by 5 wickets
Cricket Central, Sydney
Umpires: Leone Mizzi and Kylie White
Player of the match: Maddy Darke (Perth Scorchers)

- Perth Scorchers won the toss and elected to field.

22 October 2025
14:30 UTC+11
Scorecard

Sydney Thunder; 92 (17.4 overs)	v	Hobart Hurricanes; 5/95 (16 overs)
Olivia Maxwell 30 (30); Molly Strano 4/9 (4 overs)		Lizelle Lee 23 (15); Taneale Peschel 2/17 (4 overs)

Hobart Hurricanes won by 5 wickets
Cricket Central, Sydney
Umpires: Lauren McGill and Kate Rowlands
Player of the match: Molly Strano (Hobart Hurricanes)

- Hobart Hurricanes won the toss and elected to field.

23 October 2025
10:00 UTC+11
Scorecard

ACT Meteors; 8/126 (20 overs)	v	Adelaide Strikers; 4/119 (20 overs)
Carly Leeson 46 (36); Isabella Malgioglio 2/17 (4 overs)		Madeline Penna 55* (58); Gabby Sutcliffe 1/18 (4 overs)

ACT Meteors won by 7 runs
Blacktown Olympic Park No.2 Oval, Sydney
Umpires: Patrick Jackson and Kylie White
Player of the match: Carly Leeson (ACT Meteors)

- ACT Meteors won the toss and elected to bat.

23 October 2025
14:30 UTC+11
Scorecard

Perth Scorchers; 8/114 (20 overs)	v	Brisbane Heat; 3/115 (16.2 overs)
Mikayla Hinkley 37 (26); Nicola Hancock 3/27 (3 overs)		Lucinda Bourke 36 (35); Ruby Strange 1/15 (2.2 overs)

Brisbane Heat won by 7 wickets
Blacktown Olympic Park No.2 Oval, Sydney
Umpires: Patrick Jackson and Leone Mizzi
Player of the match: Charli Knott (Brisbane Heat)

- Perth Scorchers won the toss and elected to bat.

24 October 2025
10:00 UTC+11
Scorecard

Melbourne Stars; 8/130 (20 overs)	v	Hobart Hurricanes; 4/131 (18.2 overs)
Sasha Moloney 50 (40); Hayley Silver-Holmes 4/24 (4 overs)		Rachel Trenaman 34* (33); Jasmine Kamboj 1/16 (2 overs)

Hobart Hurricanes won by 6 wickets
Blacktown Olympic Park No.2 Oval, Sydney
Umpires: Kate Rowlands and Mel Scolyer
Player of the match: Hayley Silver-Holmes (Hobart Hurricanes)

- Melbourne Stars won the toss and elected to bat.

24 October 2025
14:30 UTC+11
Scorecard

Adelaide Strikers; 8/128 (20 overs)	v	Melbourne Renegades; 3/130 (15 overs)
Ella Wilson 28 (15); Zoe Samuel 2/15 (2 overs)		Emma de Broughe 54 (39); Jemma Barsby 1/21 (3 overs)

Melbourne Renegades won by 7 wickets
Blacktown Olympic Park No.2 Oval, Sydney
Umpires: Elsie Bradford and Elizabeth O'Dwyer
Player of the match: Emma de Broughe (Melbourne Renegades)

- Melbourne Renegades won the toss and elected to field.

25 October 2025
10:00 UTC+11
Scorecard

Brisbane Heat; 6/154 (20 overs)	v	Melbourne Stars; 91 (18.4 overs)
Georgia Redmayne 42 (33); Sasha Moloney 2/20 (4 overs)		Ella Hayward 33* (31); Lucy Hamilton 4/8 (3.4 overs)

Brisbane Heat won by 63 runs
North Sydney Oval, Sydney
Umpires: Elsie Bradford and Kylie White
Player of the match: Lucy Hamilton (Brisbane Heat)

- Melbourne Stars won the toss and elected to field.

25 October 2025
14:30 UTC+11
Scorecard

Sydney Sixers; 4/170 (20 overs)	v	Sydney Thunder; 6/146 (20 overs)
Emma Manix-Geeves 51 (50); Tara French 2/32 (4 overs)		Anika Learoyd 52 (44); Maitlan Brown 3/24 (4 overs)

Sydney Sixers won by 24 runs
North Sydney Oval, Sydney
Umpires: Mel Scolyer and Kylie White
Player of the match: Maitlan Brown (Sydney Sixers)

- Sydney Sixers won the toss and elected to bat.

26 October 2025
10:00 UTC+11
Scorecard

Perth Scorchers; 128 (19.4 overs)	v	ACT Meteors; 6/91 (14.2 overs)
Paige Scholfield 29 (27); Zoe Cooke 3/14 (2.4 overs)		Olivia Porter 26 (31); Amy Edgar 2/14 (3.2 overs)

Perth Scorchers won by 4 runs (DLS method)
Drummoyne Oval, Sydney
Umpires: Elsie Bradford and Patrick Jackson
Player of the match: Amy Edgar (Perth Scorchers)

- ACT Meteors won the toss and elected to field.
- No further play was possible due to rain.

26 October 2025
10:00 UTC+11
Scorecard

Brisbane Heat; 128 (18.2 overs)	v	Hobart Hurricanes; 2/130 (15.2 overs)
Nicola Hancock 28 (24); Callie Wilson 3/25 (4 overs)		Nicola Carey 62* (46); Charli Knott 1/16 (2 overs)

Hobart Hurricanes won by 8 wickets
North Sydney Oval, Sydney
Umpires: Jeff Egan and Lauren McGill
Player of the match: Callie Wilson (Hobart Hurricanes)

- Brisbane Heat won the toss and elected to bat.

26 October 2025
14:30 UTC+11
Scorecard

Adelaide Strikers; 5/165 (20 overs)	v	Sydney Thunder; 2/166 (18.3 overs)
Madeline Penna 103* (66); Alex Mavros 2/36 (4 overs)		Tahlia Wilson 71 (48); Ella Wilson 1/29 (4 overs)

Sydney Thunder won by 8 wickets
Drummoyne Oval, Sydney
Umpires: Patrick Jackson and Daniel Moran
Player of the match: Madeline Penna (Adelaide Strikers)

- Sydney Thunder won the toss and elected to field.

26 October 2025
14:30 UTC+11
Scorecard

Melbourne Renegades; 6/163 (16 overs)	v	Sydney Sixers; 131 (15.2 overs)
Nicole Faltum 52 (38); Courtney Sippel 2/23 (3 overs)		Caoimhe Bray 38* (21); Charis Bekker 3/19 (3 overs)

Melbourne Renegades won by 32 runs
North Sydney Oval, Sydney
Umpires: Jeff Egan and Mel Scolyer
Player of the match: Nicole Faltum (Melbourne Renegades)

- Sydney Sixers won the toss and elected to field.
- The match was reduced to 16 overs per side due to rain.

27 October 2025
10:00 UTC+11
Scorecard

Perth Scorchers; 5/132 (20 overs)	v	Melbourne Stars; 80 (18.4 overs)
Chloe Piparo 39 (43); Sasha Moloney 1/13 (3 overs)		Ella Hayward 15 (14); Lilly Mills 4/11 (4 overs)

Perth Scorchers won by 52 runs
Blacktown Olympic Park No.2 Oval, Sydney
Umpires: Patrick Jackson and Mel Scolyer
Player of the match: Lilly Mills (Perth Scorchers)

- Melbourne Stars won the toss and elected to field.

27 October 2025
14:30 UTC+11
Scorecard

ACT Meteors; 3/140 (20 overs)	v	Melbourne Renegades; 7/141 (19.5 overs)
Olivia Porter 57* (55); Samara Dulvin 1/20 (4 overs)		Courtney Webb 69 (53); Grace Dignam 2/14 (4 overs)

Melbourne Renegades won by 3 wickets
Blacktown Olympic Park No.2 Oval, Sydney
Umpires: Elsie Bradford and Jeff Egan
Player of the match: Courtney Webb (Melbourne Renegades)

- Melbourne Renegades won the toss and elected to field.

== Knockout Stage ==
Semi-finals
1	Hobart Hurricanes	Advanced
4	Perth Scorchers
2	Brisbane Heat	Advanced
3	Melbourne Renegades

Final
SFW1	Hobart Hurricanes	4/193 (20 overs)
SFW2	Brisbane Heat	105 (19 overs)

=== Semi-finals ===
29 October 2025
10:00 UTC+11
Scorecard

Hobart Hurricanes	v	Perth Scorchers

Match abandoned
Cricket Central, Sydney
Umpires: Elizabeth O'Dwyer and Patrick Jackson

- No toss.
- No play was possible due to rain.
- Hobart Hurricanes advanced to final after finishing top of League stage.

29 October 2025
14:30 UTC+11
Scorecard

Brisbane Heat	v	Melbourne Renegades

Match abandoned
Cricket Central, Sydney
Umpires: Elizabeth O'Dwyer and Patrick Jackson

- No toss.
- No play was possible due to rain.
- Brisbane Heat qualified for the final due to higher position in the points table.

=== Final ===
30 October 2025
14:00 UTC+11
Scorecard

Hobart Hurricanes; 4/193 (20 overs)	v	Brisbane Heat; 105 (19 overs)
Elyse Villani 61 (29); Clodagh Ryall 1/17 (2 overs)		Nicola Hancock 27 (27); Callie Wilson 3/15 (4 overs)

Hobart Hurricanes won by 88 runs
Cricket Central, Sydney
Umpires: Patrick Jackson and Lauren McGill
Player of the match: Elyse Villani (Hobart Hurricanes)

- Brisbane Heat won the toss and elected to field.
