= 2026–27 Perth Scorchers (WBBL) season =

Perth Scorchers
2026–27 season
- Perth Scorchers 2022–23 cap logo
- Coach: Becky Grundy
- Captain(s): Beth Mooney
- Home ground: WACA Ground
- League: WBBL

The 2026–27 Perth Scorchers Women's season will be the 12th season of the Women's Big Bash League. They will be coached by Becky Grundy and captained by Beth Mooney.

== Current squad ==
The squad of the Perth Scorchers for the WBBL|12 as of 28 October 2026.

- Players with international caps are listed in **bold**.

No.	Name	Nat.	Birth Date	Batting style	Bowling style	Notes
Batters
4	Mikayla Hinkley	Australia	1 May 1998 (age 28)	Right-handed	Right-arm medium	
2	Katie Mack	Australia	14 September 1993 (age 33)	Right-handed	Right-arm leg spin	
28	Chloe Piparo	Australia	5 September 1994 (age 32)	Right-handed	Right-arm off spin	
All-rounders
77	**Sophie Devine**	New Zealand	1 September 1989 (age 37)	Right-handed	Right-arm medium	Captain, International Signing
9	Amy Edgar	Australia	27 December 1997 (age 28)	Right-handed	Right-arm off spin	
6	**Freya Kemp**	England	21 April 2005 (age 21)	Left-handed	Left-arm medium	International Signing
14	**Fatima Sana**	Pakistan	8 November 2001 (age 24)	Right-handed	Right-arm medium-fast	International Signing
Wicket-keeper
55	**Ines McKeon**	Australia	19 April 2007 (age 19)	Right-handed	—N/a	
10	**Beth Mooney**	Australia	14 January 1994 (age 32)	Left-handed	—N/a	
Bowlers
44	Chloe Ainsworth	Australia	14 September 2005 (age 21)	Right-handed	Right-arm medium	
14	Ebony Hoskin	Australia	23 March 2003 (age 23)	Right-handed	Right-arm fast	
23	**Alana King**	Australia	22 November 1995 (age 30)	Right-handed	Right-arm leg spin	
56	Lilly Mills	Australia	2 January 2001 (age 25)	Right-handed	Right-arm off spin	
6	Taneale Peschel	Australia	29 August 1994 (age 32)	Right-handed	Right-arm medium-fast	
25	Ruby Strange	Australia	25 November 2002 (age 23)	Right-handed	Right-arm medium	

== Fixtures ==
Match 5
31 October 2026
19:10 (D/N)
Scorecard

Perth Scorchers (H)	v	Melbourne Renegades

WACA Ground, Perth

Match 8
2 November 2026
19:10 (N)
Scorecard

Melbourne Stars (H)	v	Perth Scorchers

Junction Oval, Melbourne

Match 11
5 November 2026
19:10 (N)
Scorecard

Sydney Thunder (H)	v	Perth Scorchers

Drummoyne Oval, Sydney

Match 16
8 November 2026
17:10 (D/N)
Scorecard

Perth Scorchers (H)	v	Melbourne Stars

North Sydney Oval, Sydney

Match 18
11 November 2026
19:10 (D/N)
Scorecard

Perth Scorchers (H)	v	Sydney Thunder

WACA Ground, Perth

Match 22
14 November 2026
19:10 (D/N)
Scorecard

Perth Scorchers (H)	v	Adelaide Strikers

WACA Ground, Perth

Match 26
19 November 2026
15:40
Scorecard

Hobart Hurricanes (H)	v	Perth Scorchers

Allan Border Field, Brisbane

Match 30
21 November 2026
15:30
Scorecard

Sydney Sixers (H)	v	Perth Scorchers

North Sydney Oval, Sydney

Match 36
27 November 2026
21:10 (D/N)
Scorecard

Perth Scorchers (H)	v	Hobart Hurricanes

WACA Ground, Perth

Match 39
29 November 2026
12:00
Scorecard

Brisbane Heat (H)	v	Perth Scorchers

Karen Rolton Oval, Adelaide

== Standing ==
=== Points table ===
Pos	Team	Pld	W	L	NR	Pts	NRR	
1	Sydney Thunder	1	1	0	0	2	1.335	Advanced to Final
2	Melbourne Stars	1	1	0	0	2	0.900	Advanced to Challenger
3	Adelaide Strikers	0	0	0	0	0	—	Advanced to Knock-out
4	Brisbane Heat	0	0	0	0	0	—	Advanced to Knock-out
5	Perth Scorchers	0	0	0	0	0	—	
6	Sydney Sixers	0	0	0	0	0	—	
7	Hobart Hurricanes	1	0	1	0	0	−0.900	
8	Melbourne Renegades	1	0	1	0	0	−1.335	

Updated to match(es) played on 29 October 2026. Source: Cricinfo

=== Match summary ===
Team	League matches										Finals		
Team	1	2	3	4	5	6	7	8	9	10	QF/KO	Ch	F
Perth Scorchers													

Win	Loss	Tie	No result
