= 2026–27 Brisbane Heat (WBBL) season =

Brisbane Heat
2026–27 season
- Coach: Mark Sorell
- Captain(s): Georgia Redmayne
- Home ground: Allan Border Field
- League: WBBL

The 2026–27 Brisbane Heat season will be the 12th season of the Women's Big Bash League. They will be coached by Mark Sorell and captained by Georgia Redmayne.

== Background ==
The Brisbane Heat entered the (WBBL|12) season aiming to improve after finishing eighth in the previous season. Georgia Redmayne was appointed captain, succeeding Jess Jonassen, while Mark Sorell continued as head coach. The Heat strengthened their squad with the signings of Ireland international Orla Prendergast and England leg-spinner Sarah Glenn, alongside retaining several key Queensland players. The team aimed to return to the finals under Redmayne's leadership.

== Current squad ==
The squad of the Brisbane Heat for the WBBL|12 as of 28 October 2026.

- Players with international caps are listed in **bold**.
- * denotes a player who is unavailable for rest of the season.

No.	Name	Nat.	Birth Date	Batting Style	Bowling Style	Additional Info.
Batters
7	Lucy Bourke	Australia	2 September 2005 (age 21)	Right-handed	Right-arm medium	
18	Annie O'Neil	Australia	18 February 1999 (age 27)	Right-handed	Right-arm leg spin	
All-rounders
11	Sianna Ginger	Australia	26 July 2005 (age 21)	Right-handed	Right-arm fast-medium	
17	**Grace Harris**	Australia	18 September 1993 (age 33)	Right-handed	Right-arm off spin	
21	**Jess Jonassen**	Australia	5 November 1992 (age 33)	Left-handed	Left-arm orthodox	Ruled out through injury
88	Charli Knott	Australia	29 November 2002 (age 23)	Right-handed	Right-arm off spin	
84	**Orla Prendergast**	Ireland	1 June 2002 (age 24)	Right-handed	Right-arm medium	International Signing
Wicket-keepers
19	**Yastika Bhatia**	India	1 November 2000 (age 25)	Left-handed	—N/a	International Replacement Player
8	Georgia Redmayne	Australia	8 December 1993 (age 32)	Left-handed	—N/a	Captain
43	Mikayla Wrigley	Australia	12 February 2004 (age 22)	Right-handed	—N/a	
Bowlers
22	Lily Bassingthwaighte	Australia	25 March 2007 (age 19)	Right-handed	Right-arm fast-medium	
2	Bonnie Berry	Australia	24 February 2006 (age 20)	Right-handed	Right-arm fast-medium	
3	**Sarah Glenn**	England	27 August 1999 (age 27)	Right-handed	Right-arm leg spin	International Signing
5	**Lucy Hamilton**	Australia	5 August 2006 (age 20)	Left-handed	Left-arm fast	
34	Grace Parsons	Australia	18 August 2003 (age 23)	Right-handed	Right-arm leg spin	
15	Catherine White	Australia	July 4, 2007 (age 19)	Right-handed	Right-arm leg spin	

== Fixtures ==
Match 3
30 October 2026
19:40 (N)
Scorecard

Brisbane Heat (H)	v	Sydney Sixers

Allan Border Field, Brisbane

Match 6
1 November 2026
15:40
Scorecard

Sydney Thunder (H)	v	Brisbane Heat

Drummoyne Oval, Sydney

Match 10
5 November 2026
15:40
Scorecard

Adelaide Strikers (H)	v	Brisbane Heat

Drummoyne Oval, Sydney

Match 14
7 November 2026
19:10 (N)
Scorecard

Brisbane Heat (H)	v	Hobart Hurricanes

Allan Border Field, Brisbane

Match 19
12 November 2026
15:40
Scorecard

Melbourne Stars (H)	v	Brisbane Heat

Junction Oval, Melbourne

Match 21
14 November 2026
15:40
Scorecard

Hobart Hurricanes (H)	v	Brisbane Heat

Bellerive Oval, Hobart

Match 27
19 November 2026
19:10 (N)
Scorecard

Brisbane Heat (H)	v	Sydney Thunder

Allan Border Field, Brisbane

Match 31
22 November 2026
15:40
Scorecard

Brisbane Heat (H)	v	Adelaide Strikers

Allan Border Field, Brisbane

Match 33
25 November 2026
19:10 (N)
Scorecard

Melbourne Renegades (H)	v	Brisbane Heat

Junction Oval, Melbourne

Match 39
29 November 2026
12:00
Scorecard

Brisbane Heat (H)	v	Perth Scorchers

Karen Rolton Oval, Adelaide

== Standing ==
=== Points table ===
Pos	Team	Pld	W	L	NR	Pts	NRR	
1	Adelaide Strikers	0	0	0	0	0	—	Advanced to Final
2	Brisbane Heat	0	0	0	0	0	—	Advanced to Challenger
3	Hobart Hurricanes	0	0	0	0	0	—	Advanced to Knock-out
4	Melbourne Renegades	0	0	0	0	0	—	Advanced to Knock-out
5	Melbourne Stars	0	0	0	0	0	—	
6	Perth Scorchers	0	0	0	0	0	—	
7	Sydney Sixers	0	0	0	0	0	—	
8	Sydney Thunder	0	0	0	0	0	—	

Updated to match(es) played on unknown. Source: Cricinfo

=== Match summary ===
Team	League matches										Finals		
Team	1	2	3	4	5	6	7	8	9	10	QF/KO	Ch	F
Brisbane Heat													

Win	Loss	Tie	No result

== Administration and support staff ==
Position	Name
Head Coach	(Australia) Mark Sorrel
