= 2026–27 Hobart Hurricanes (WBBL) season =

Hobart Hurricanes
2026–27 season
- Coach: Jude Coleman
- Captain(s): Nicola Carey
- Home ground: Bellerive Oval
- League: WBBL

The 2026–27 Hobart Hurricanes season will be the 12th season of the Women's Big Bash League. They will be coached by Jude Coleman and captained by Nicola Carey.

== Current squad ==
The squad of the Hobart Hurricanes for the WBBL|12 as of 26 October 2026.

- Players with international caps are listed in **bold**.
- * denotes a player who is unavailable for rest of the season.

No.	Name	Nat.	Birth Date	Batting Style	Bowling Style	Additional Info.
Batters
8	Rachel Trenaman	Australia	8 April 2001 (age 25)	Right-handed	Right-arm leg spin	
22	**Danni Wyatt-Hodge**	England	22 April 1991 (age 35)	Right-handed	Right-arm off spin	International Signing; Ruled out through injury
All-rounders
99	**Chamari Athapaththu**	Sri Lanka	9 February 1990 (age 36)	Left-handed	Right-arm off spin	International Replacement Player
16	**Nicola Carey**	Australia	10 September 1993 (age 33)	Left-handed	Right-arm medium	
11	**Heather Graham**	Australia	5 October 1996 (age 30)	Right-handed	Right-arm medium	
48	**Chinelle Henry**	West Indies	17 August 1995 (age 31)	Right-handed	Right-arm medium-fast	International Signing
28	Ruth Johnston	Australia	28 February 2003 (age 23)	Right-handed	Right-arm off spin	
Wicket-keepers
67	**Lizelle Lee**	South Africa Australia	2 April 1992 (age 34)	Right-handed	Right-arm medium	Contracted as a local player
16	Kate Pelle	Australia	17 January 2006 (age 20)	Right-handed	Right-arm medium	
Bowlers
12	Ella Hayward	Australia	8 September 2003 (age 23)	Right-handed	Right-arm off spin	
4	Hayley Silver-Holmes	Australia	18 August 2003 (age 23)	Right-handed	Right-arm fast	
14	Amy Smith	Australia	16 November 2004 (age 21)	Right-handed	Right-arm leg spin	
6	Lauren Smith	Australia	6 October 1996 (age 30)	Right-handed	Right-arm off spin	
50	**Linsey Smith**	England	10 March 1995 (age 31)	Left-handed	Left-arm orthodox	International Signing
26	**Molly Strano**	Australia	5 October 1992 (age 34)	Right-handed	Right-arm off spin	
5	Callie Wilson	Australia	1 November 2003 (age 22)	Right-handed	Right-arm medium	

== Fixtures ==
Match 2
29 October 2026
19:10 (N)
Scorecard

Melbourne Stars (H); 4/192 (20 overs)	v	Hobart Hurricanes; 8/174 (20 overs)
Meg Lanning 71 (52); Heather Graham 2/31 (4 overs)		Lizelle Lee 57 (33); Annabel Sutherland 3/34 (4 overs)

Melbourne Stars won by 18 runs
Junction Oval, Melbourne
Umpires: Clare Haysom and Bede Sajowitz
Player of the match: Annabel Sutherland (Melbourne Stars)

- Hobart Hurricanes won the toss and elected to field.

Match 7
1 November 2026
19:10 (N)
Scorecard

Sydney Sixers (H)	v	Hobart Hurricanes

Drummoyne Oval, Sydney

Match 9
4 November 2026
19:10 (N)
Scorecard

Hobart Hurricanes (H)	v	Melbourne Renegades

Bellerive Oval, Hobart

Match 14
7 November 2026
19:10 (N)
Scorecard

Brisbane Heat (H)	v	Hobart Hurricanes

Allan Border Field, Brisbane

Match 17
10 November 2026
19:10 (N)
Scorecard

Hobart Hurricanes (H)	v	Adelaide Strikers

Bellerive Oval, Hobart

Match 21
14 November 2026
15:40
Scorecard

Hobart Hurricanes (H)	v	Brisbane Heat

Bellerive Oval, Hobart

Match 26
19 November 2026
15:40
Scorecard

Hobart Hurricanes (H)	v	Perth Scorchers

Allan Border Field, Brisbane

Match 29
21 November 2026
12:00
Scorecard

Hobart Hurricanes (H)	v	Sydney Thunder

Bellerive Oval, Hobart

Match 36
27 November 2026
21:10 (D/N)
Scorecard

Perth Scorchers (H)	v	Hobart Hurricanes

WACA Ground, Perth

Match 40
29 November 2026
15:30
Scorecard

Adelaide Strikers (H)	v	Hobart Hurricanes

Karen Rolton Oval, Adelaide

== Standing ==
=== Points table ===
Pos	Team	Pld	W	L	NR	Pts	NRR	Qualification
1	Sydney Thunder	1	1	0	0	2	1.335	Advanced to the Final
2	Melbourne Stars	1	1	0	0	2	0.900	Advanced to the Challenger
3	Sydney Sixers	1	1	0	0	2	0.150	Advanced to the Knock-out
4	Adelaide Strikers	0	0	0	0	0	—	Advanced to the Knock-out
5	Perth Scorchers	0	0	0	0	0	—	
6	Brisbane Heat	1	0	1	0	0	−0.150	
7	Hobart Hurricanes	1	0	1	0	0	−0.900	
8	Melbourne Renegades	1	0	1	0	0	−1.335	

Updated to match(es) played on 30 October 2026. Source: Cricinfo

=== Match summary ===
Team	League matches										Finals		
Team	1	2	3	4	5	6	7	8	9	10	QF/KO	Ch	F
Hobart Hurricanes													

Win	Loss	Tie	No result

== Administration and support staff ==
Position	Name
Head Coach	(Australia) Jude Coleman
Assistant coach	Lauren Winfield-Hill
Bowling coach	Kristen Beams
Batting coach	Mark McInnes
