= 2026–27 Adelaide Strikers (WBBL) season =

Adelaide Strikers
2026–27 season
- Adelaide Strikers 2022–23 cap logo
- Coach: Luke Williams
- Captain(s): Tahlia McGrath
- Home ground: Karen Rolton Oval
- League: WBBL

The 2026–27 Adelaide Strikers Women's season will be the 12th season of the Women's Big Bash League. They will be coached by Luke Williams and captained by Tahlia McGrath.

== Current squad ==
The squad of the Adelaide Strikers for the WBBL|12 as of 27 October 2026.

- Players with international caps are listed in **bold**.
- * denotes a player who is unavailable for rest of the season.

| No. | Name | Nat. | Birth date | Batting style | Bowling style | Notes |
Batters
| 22 | **Maia Bouchier** | England | 5 December 1998 (age 27) | Right-handed | Right-arm medium | International Signing |
| 2 | Emma de Broughe | Australia | 6 September 2000 (age 26) | Right-handed | Right-arm medium | |
| 14 | **Laura Wolvaardt** | South Africa | 26 April 1999 (age 27) | Right-handed | Right-arm medium | International Signing |
All-rounders
| 35 | Eleanor Larosa | Australia | 26 November 2005 (age 20) | Left-handed | Left-arm medium | |
| 9 | **Tahlia McGrath** | Australia | 10 November 1995 (age 30) | Right-handed | Right-arm medium | Captain |
| 11 | Maddie Penna | Australia | 30 August 2000 (age 26) | Right-handed | Right-arm leg spin | |
Wicket-keepers
| 77 | Ellie Johnston | Australia | 29 January 2003 (age 23) | Right-handed | —N/a | |
| 21 | Bridget Patterson | Australia | 4 December 1994 (age 31) | Right-handed | —N/a | |
Bowlers
| 20 | **Darcie Brown** | Australia | 7 March 2003 (age 23) | Right-handed | Right-arm fast | Ruled out through injury |
| 7 | Maggie Clark | Australia | 15 March 2007 (age 19) | Left-handed | Right-arm fast-medium | |
| 19 | **Sophie Ecclestone** | England | 6 May 1999 (age 27) | Right-handed | Left-arm orthodox | International Signing |
| 61 | **Anesu Mushangwe** | Zimbabwe Australia | 25 February 1996 (age 30) | Right-handed | Right-arm leg spin | |
| 27 | **Megan Schutt** | Australia | 15 January 1993 (age 33) | Right-handed | Right-arm fast | |
| 10 | Amanda-Jade Wellington | Australia | 29 May 1997 (age 29) | Right-handed | Right-arm leg spin | |
| 8 | Ella Wilson | Australia | 17 November 2003 (age 22) | Right-handed | Right-arm fast-medium | |

== Fixtures ==
Match 4
31 October 2026
19:10
Scorecard

| Adelaide Strikers (H) | v | Melbourne Stars |

Karen Rolton Oval, Adelaide

Match 10
5 November 2026
15:40
Scorecard

| Adelaide Strikers (H) | v | Brisbane Heat |

Drummoyne Oval, Sydney

Match 13
7 November 2026
15:40
Scorecard

| Melbourne Renegades (H) | v | Adelaide Strikers |

Junction Oval, Melbourne

Match 17
10 November 2026
19:10 (N)
Scorecard

| Hobart Hurricanes (H) | v | Adelaide Strikers |

Bellerive Oval, Hobart

Match 22
14 November 2026
19:10 (D/N)
Scorecard

| Perth Scorchers (H) | v | Adelaide Strikers |

WACA Ground, Perth

Match 25
17 November 2026
19:10 (N)
Scorecard

| Adelaide Strikers (H) | v | Sydney Sixers |

Karen Rolton Oval, Adelaide

Match 28
20 November 2026
19:10 (N)
Scorecard

| Adelaide Strikers (H) | v | Melbourne Renegades |

Adelaide Oval, Adelaide

Match 31
22 November 2026
15:40
Scorecard

| Brisbane Heat (H) | v | Adelaide Strikers |

Allan Border Field, Brisbane

Match 34
26 November 2026
15:40
Scorecard

| Sydney Thunder (H) | v | Adelaide Strikers |

North Sydney Oval, Sydney

Match 40
29 November 2026
15:30
Scorecard

| Adelaide Strikers (H) | v | Hobart Hurricanes |

Karen Rolton Oval, Adelaide

== Standing ==
=== Points table ===
| Pos | Team | Pld | W | L | NR | Pts | NRR | |
|---|---|---|---|---|---|---|---|---|
| 1 | Adelaide Strikers | 0 | 0 | 0 | 0 | 0 | — | Advanced to Final |
| 2 | Brisbane Heat | 0 | 0 | 0 | 0 | 0 | — | Advanced to Challenger |
| 3 | Hobart Hurricanes | 0 | 0 | 0 | 0 | 0 | — | Advanced to Knock-out |
| 4 | Melbourne Renegades | 0 | 0 | 0 | 0 | 0 | — | Advanced to Knock-out |
| 5 | Melbourne Stars | 0 | 0 | 0 | 0 | 0 | — | |
| 6 | Perth Scorchers | 0 | 0 | 0 | 0 | 0 | — | |
| 7 | Sydney Sixers | 0 | 0 | 0 | 0 | 0 | — | |
| 8 | Sydney Thunder | 0 | 0 | 0 | 0 | 0 | — | |

Updated to match(es) played on unknown. Source: Cricinfo

=== Match summary ===
| Team | League matches | | | | | | | | | | Finals | | |
| Team | 1 | 2 | 3 | 4 | 5 | 6 | 7 | 8 | 9 | 10 | QF/KO | Ch | F |
|---|---|---|---|---|---|---|---|---|---|---|---|---|---|
| Adelaide Strikers | | | | | | | | | | | | | |

| Win | Loss | Tie | No result |

== Administration and support staff ==
Adelaide Strikers staff
| Position | Name |
|---|---|
| Head Coach | (Australia) Luke Williams |
