= 2026–27 Sydney Sixers (WBBL) season =

Sydney Sixers
2026–27 season
- Sydney Sixers cap logo
- Coach: Peter Clarke
- Captain(s): Ellyse Perry
- Home ground: North Sydney Oval
- League: WBBL

The 2026–27 Sydney Sixers season will be the 12th season of the Women's Big Bash League. They will be coached by Peter Clarke and captained by Ashleigh Gardner.

== Current squad ==
The squad of the Sydney Sixers for WBBL|12 as of 26 October 2026.

- Players with international caps are listed in **bold**.

No.	Name	Nat.	Birth Date	Batting Style	Bowling Style	Additional Info.
Batters
47	**Sophia Dunkley**	England	16 July 1998 (age 28)	Right-handed	Right-arm leg spin	International Signing
26	**Elsa Hunter**	Malaysia Australia	15 February 2005 (age 21)	Right-handed	Right-arm off spin	Signed as a local player
38	Eva Ragg	Australia	8 November 2004 (age 21)	Right-handed	Right-arm off spin	
All-rounders
88	Maitlan Brown	Australia	5 June 1997 (age 29)	Right-handed	Right-arm fast	
29	**Erin Burns**	Australia	22 June 1988 (age 38)	Right-handed	Right-arm off spin	
54	**Alice Capsey**	England	11 August 2004 (age 22)	Right-handed	Right-arm off spin	International Signing
6	**Ashleigh Gardner**	Australia	15 April 1997 (age 29)	Right-handed	Right-arm off spin	Captain
48	**Amelia Kerr**	New Zealand	13 October 2000 (age 26)	Right-handed	Right-arm leg spin	International Signing
8	**Ellyse Perry**	Australia	3 November 1990 (age 35)	Right-handed	Right-arm medium	
Wicket-keepers
7	Maddy Darke	Australia	30 March 2001 (age 25)	Right-handed	—N/a	
12	Grace Lyons	Australia	12 September 2005 (age 21)	Right-handed	—N/a	Local Replacement Player
Bowlers
18	Caoimhe Bray	Australia	23 September 2009 (age 17)	Right-handed	Right-arm medium	
5	**Lauren Cheatle**	Australia	6 November 1998 (age 27)	Left-handed	Left-arm fast-medium	
25	**Sarah Coyte**	Australia	30 March 1991 (age 35)	Right-handed	Right-arm medium	
16	Frankie Nicklin	Australia	20 January 2005 (age 21)	Right-handed	Right-arm leg spin	
37	Courtney Sippel	Australia	27 April 2001 (age 25)	Left-handed	Right-arm medium	

== Fixtures ==
Match 3
30 October 2026
19:40 (N)
Scorecard

Brisbane Heat (H)	v	Sydney Sixers

Allan Border Field, Brisbane

Match 7
1 November 2026
19:10 (N)
Scorecard

Sydney Sixers (H)	v	Hobart Hurricanes

Drummoyne Oval, Sydney

Match 12
6 November 2026
19:10 (N)
Scorecard

Melbourne Stars (H)	v	Sydney Sixers

Junction Oval, Melbourne

Match 15
8 November 2026
13:40
Scorecard

Sydney Sixers (H)	v	Sydney Thunder

North Sydney Oval, Sydney

Match 20
12 November 2026
19:10 (N)
Scorecard

Melbourne Renegades (H)	v	Sydney Sixers

Junction Oval, Melbourne

Match 23
15 November 2026
11:00
Scorecard

Sydney Sixers (H)	v	Melbourne Renegades

North Sydney Oval, Sydney

Match 25
17 November 2026
19:10 (N)
Scorecard

Adelaide Strikers (H)	v	Sydney Sixers

Karen Rolton Oval, Adelaide

Match 30
21 November 2026
15:30
Scorecard

Sydney Sixers (H)	v	Perth Scorchers

North Sydney Oval, Sydney

Match 35
26 November 2026
19:10 (N)
Scorecard

Sydney Sixers (H)	v	Melbourne Stars

North Sydney Oval, Sydney

Match 38
28 November 2026
19:10 (N)
Scorecard

Sydney Thunder (H)	v	Sydney Sixers

Drummoyne Oval, Sydney

== Standing ==
=== Points table ===
Pos	Team	Pld	W	L	NR	Pts	NRR	
1	Adelaide Strikers	0	0	0	0	0	—	Advanced to Final
2	Brisbane Heat	0	0	0	0	0	—	Advanced to Challenger
3	Hobart Hurricanes	0	0	0	0	0	—	Advanced to Knock-out
4	Melbourne Renegades	0	0	0	0	0	—	Advanced to Knock-out
5	Melbourne Stars	0	0	0	0	0	—	
6	Perth Scorchers	0	0	0	0	0	—	
7	Sydney Sixers	0	0	0	0	0	—	
8	Sydney Thunder	0	0	0	0	0	—	

Updated to match(es) played on unknown. Source: Cricinfo

=== Match summary ===
Team	League matches										Finals		
Team	1	2	3	4	5	6	7	8	9	10	QF/KO	Ch	F
Sydney Sixers													

Win	Loss	Tie	No result

== Administration and support staff ==
Sydney Sixers staff
Position	Name
Head Coach	Peter Clarke
General Manager	Rachel Haynes
