= 2026–27 Sydney Thunder (WBBL) season =

Sydney Thunder
2026–27 season
- Coach: Lisa Keightley
- Captain(s): Phoebe Litchfield
- Home ground: Drummoyne Oval
- League: WBBL

The 2026–27 Sydney Thunder season will be the 12th season of the Women's Big Bash League. They will be coached by Lisa Keightley and captained by Phoebe Litchfield.

== Current squad ==
The squad of the Sydney Thunder for the WBBL|12 as of 26 October 2026.

- Players with international caps are listed in **bold**.

No.	Name	Nat.	Birth date	Batting style	Bowling style	Additional Info.
Batters
24	Laura Harris	Australia	18 August 1990 (age 36)	Right-handed	Right-arm medium	
5	**Heather Knight**	England	26 December 1990 (age 35)	Right-handed	Right-arm off spin	International Signing
4	Anika Learoyd	Australia	14 April 2002 (age 24)	Right-handed	Right-arm leg spin	
18	**Phoebe Litchfield**	Australia	18 April 2003 (age 23)	Left-handed	Right-arm leg spin	Captain
13	**Georgia Voll**	Australia	5 August 2003 (age 23)	Right-handed	Right-arm off spin	
All-rounders
25	**Hannah Darlington**	Australia	25 January 2002 (age 24)	Right-handed	Right-arm medium	
32	**Nadine de Klerk**	South Africa	16 January 2000 (age 26)	Right-handed	Right-arm medium	International Signing
81	Lucy Finn	Australia	1 February 2007 (age 19)	Right-handed	Right-arm medium	
9	Hasrat Gill	Australia	9 November 2005 (age 20)	Left-handed	Right-arm leg spin	
Wicket-keepers
21	**Tahlia Wilson**	Australia	21 October 1999 (age 27)	Right-handed	—N/a	
Bowlers
4	Jemma Barsby	Australia	4 October 1995 (age 31)	Left-handed	Right-arm off spin, Left-arm orthodox	
63	**Lauren Bell**	England	2 January 2001 (age 25)	Right-handed	Right-arm fast-medium	International Signing
34	Samantha Bates	Australia	17 August 1992 (age 34)	Right-handed	Left-arm orthodox	
44	Nicola Hancock	Australia	8 November 1995 (age 30)	Right-handed	Right-arm medium	

== Fixtures ==
Match 1
29 October 2026
15:40
Scorecard

Melbourne Renegades (H)	v	Sydney Thunder

Junction Oval, Melbourne

Match 6
1 November 2026
15:40
Scorecard

Sydney Thunder (H)	v	Brisbane Heat

Drummoyne Oval, Sydney

Match 11
5 November 2026
19:10 (N)
Scorecard

Sydney Thunder (H)	v	Perth Scorchers

Drummoyne Oval, Sydney

Match 18
11 November 2026
19:10 (D/N)
Scorecard

Perth Scorchers (H)	v	Sydney Thunder

WACA Ground, Perth

Match 24
16 November 2026
19:10 (N)
Scorecard

Sydney Thunder (H)	v	Melbourne Stars

Drummoyne Oval, Sydney

Match 27
19 November 2026
19:10 (N)
Scorecard

Brisbane Heat (H)	v	Sydney Thunder

Allan Border Field, Brisbane

Match 29
21 November 2026
12:00
Scorecard

Hobart Hurricanes (H)	v	Sydney Thunder

Bellerive Oval, Hobart

Match 34
26 November 2026
15:40
Scorecard

Sydney Thunder (H)	v	Adelaide Strikers

North Sydney Oval, Sydney

Match 38
28 November 2026
19:10 (N)
Scorecard

Sydney Thunder (H)	v	Sydney Sixers

Drummoyne Oval, Sydney

Match 40
29 November 2026
15:30
Scorecard

Adelaide Strikers (H)	v	Hobart Hurricanes

Karen Rolton Oval, Adelaide

== Standing ==
=== Points table ===
Pos	Team	Pld	W	L	NR	Pts	NRR	
1	Adelaide Strikers	0	0	0	0	0	—	Advanced to Final
2	Brisbane Heat	0	0	0	0	0	—	Advanced to Challenger
3	Hobart Hurricanes	0	0	0	0	0	—	Advanced to Knock-out
4	Melbourne Renegades	0	0	0	0	0	—	Advanced to Knock-out
5	Melbourne Stars	0	0	0	0	0	—	
6	Perth Scorchers	0	0	0	0	0	—	
7	Sydney Sixers	0	0	0	0	0	—	
8	Sydney Thunder	0	0	0	0	0	—	

Updated to match(es) played on unknown. Source: Cricinfo

=== Match summary ===
Team	League matches										Finals		
Team	1	2	3	4	5	6	7	8	9	10	QF/KO	Ch	F
Sydney Thunder													

Win	Loss	Tie	No result
