= 2026–27 Melbourne Renegades (WBBL) season =

Melbourne Renegades
2026–27 season
- Coach: Gavan Twining
- Captain(s): Sophie Molineux
- Home ground: Junction Oval
- League: WBBL

The 2026–27 Melbourne Renegades season will be the 12th season of the Women's Big Bash League. They will be captained by Sophie Molineux.

== Current squad ==
The squad of the Melbourne Renegades for the WBBL|12 as of 26 October 2026.

- Players with international caps are listed in **bold**.

No.	Name	Nat.	Date of birth	Batting Style	Bowling Style	Additional Info.
Batters
33	Olivia Porter	Australia	14 November 2001 (age 24)	Right-handed	Right-arm medium	
11	Courtney Webb	Australia	30 November 1999 (age 26)	Right-handed	Right-arm medium	
25	**Annie Wikman**	Australia	27 April 2001 (age 25)	Right-handed	Right-arm medium	
All-rounders
5	**Deandra Dottin**	West Indies	21 June 1991 (age 35)	Right-handed	Right-arm medium	International Signing
25	Tess Flintoff	Australia	31 March 2003 (age 23)	Right-handed	Right-arm medium	
50	**Hayley Matthews**	West Indies	19 March 1998 (age 28)	Right-handed	Right-arm off spin	International Signing
23	**Sophie Molineux**	Australia	17 January 1998 (age 28)	Left-handed	Left-arm orthodox	Captain
25	**Chloe Tryon**	South Africa	25 January 1994 (age 32)	Right-handed	Left-arm orthodox	International Signing
32	**Georgia Wareham**	Australia	26 May 1999 (age 27)	Right-handed	Right-arm leg spin	
Wicket-keeper
4	Nicole Faltum	Australia	17 January 2000 (age 26)	Right-handed	—N/a	
20	Sophie Reid	Australia	28 September 1997 (age 29)	Left-handed	—N/a	
Bowlers
51	Milly Illingworth	Australia	15 July 2005 (age 21)	Right-handed	Right-arm fast	
22	Sara Kennedy	Australia	2 August 2007 (age 19)	Right-handed	Left-arm medium	
30	**Tayla Vlaeminck**	Australia	27 October 1998 (age 27)	Right-handed	Right-arm fast	

== Fixtures ==
Match 1
29 October 2026
15:40
Scorecard

Melbourne Renegades (H)	v	Sydney Thunder

Junction Oval, Melbourne

Match 5
31 October 2026
19:10 (D/N)
Scorecard

Perth Scorchers (H)	v	Melbourne Renegades

WACA Ground, Perth

Match 9
4 November 2026
19:10 (N)
Scorecard

Hobart Hurricanes (H)	v	Melbourne Renegades

Bellerive Oval, Hobart

Match 13
7 November 2026
15:40
Scorecard

Melbourne Renegades (H)	v	Adelaide Strikers

Junction Oval, Melbourne

Match 20
12 November 2026
19:10 (N)
Scorecard

Melbourne Renegades (H)	v	Sydney Sixers

Junction Oval, Melbourne

Match 23
15 November 2026
11:00
Scorecard

Sydney Sixers (H)	v	Melbourne Renegades

North Sydney Oval, Sydney

Match 28
20 November 2026
19:10 (N)
Scorecard

Adelaide Strikers (H)	v	Melbourne Renegades

Adelaide Oval, Adelaide

Match 32
22 November 2026
19:10 (N)
Scorecard

Melbourne Stars (H)	v	Melbourne Renegades

Junction Oval, Melbourne

Match 33
25 November 2026
19:10 (N)
Scorecard

Melbourne Renegades (H)	v	Brisbane Heat

Junction Oval, Melbourne

Match 37
28 November 2026
15:40
Scorecard

Melbourne Renegades (H)	v	Melbourne Stars

Junction Oval, Melbourne

== Standing ==
=== Points table ===
Pos	Team	Pld	W	L	NR	Pts	NRR	
1	Adelaide Strikers	0	0	0	0	0	—	Advanced to Final
2	Brisbane Heat	0	0	0	0	0	—	Advanced to Challenger
3	Hobart Hurricanes	0	0	0	0	0	—	Advanced to Knock-out
4	Melbourne Renegades	0	0	0	0	0	—	Advanced to Knock-out
5	Melbourne Stars	0	0	0	0	0	—	
6	Perth Scorchers	0	0	0	0	0	—	
7	Sydney Sixers	0	0	0	0	0	—	
8	Sydney Thunder	0	0	0	0	0	—	

Updated to match(es) played on unknown. Source: Cricinfo

=== Match summary ===
Team	League matches										Finals		
Team	1	2	3	4	5	6	7	8	9	10	QF/KO	Ch	F
Melbourne Renegades													

Win	Loss	Tie	No result
