= 2026–27 Melbourne Stars (WBBL) season =

Melbourne Stars
2026–27 season
- Melbourne Stars 2022–23 cap logo
- Captain(s): Meg Lanning
- Home ground: CitiPower Centre
- League: WBBL

The 2026–27 Melbourne Stars Women's season will be the 12th season of the Women's Big Bash League. They will be captained by Meg Lanning.

== Current squad ==
The squad of the Melbourne Stars for WBBL|12 as of 26 October 2026.

- Players with international caps are listed in **bold**.

No.	Name	Nat.	Birth Date	Batting Style	Bowling Style	Additional Info.
Batters
7	**Meg Lanning**	Australia	25 March 1992 (age 34)	Right-handed	Right-arm medium	Captain
24	Indigo Noble	Australia	27 December 2003 (age 22)	Right-handed	Right-arm medium	
10	**Naomi Stalenberg**	Australia	18 April 1994 (age 32)	Right-handed	Right-arm medium	
All-rounders
22	**Charlie Dean**	England	22 December 2000 (age 25)	Right-handed	Right-arm off spin	International Signing
34	**Kim Garth**	Australia	25 April 1996 (age 30)	Right-handed	Right-arm fast	
28	**Dani Gibson**	England	30 April 2001 (age 25)	Right-handed	Right-arm medium	International Signing
74	Carly Leeson	Australia	9 November 1998 (age 27)	Right-handed	Right-arm medium	
11	Rhys McKenna	Australia	17 August 2004 (age 22)	Right-handed	Left-arm fast	
29	Zoe Samuel	Australia	2 February 2007 (age 19)	Right-handed	Right-arm medium	
3	**Annabel Sutherland**	Australia	12 October 2001 (age 25)	Right-handed	Right-arm fast	
Wicket-keepers
40	**Amy Jones**	England	13 June 1993 (age 33)	Right-handed	—N/a	International Signing
Bowlers
6	Sophie Day	Australia	2 September 1998 (age 28)	Left-handed	Left-arm orthodox	
13	Maisy Gibson	Australia	14 September 1996 (age 30)	Left-handed	Right-arm leg spin	
16	Georgia Prestwidge	Australia	17 December 1997 (age 28)	Right-handed	Right-arm medium	

== Fixtures ==
Match 4
31 October 2026
19:10
Scorecard

Adelaide Strikers (H)	v	Melbourne Stars

Karen Rolton Oval, Adelaide

Match 8
2 November 2026
19:10 (N)
Scorecard

Melbourne Stars (H)	v	Perth Scorchers

Junction Oval, Melbourne

Match 12
6 November 2026
19:10 (N)
Scorecard

Melbourne Stars (H)	v	Sydney Sixers

Junction Oval, Melbourne

Match 16
8 November 2026
17:10 (D/N)
Scorecard

Perth Scorchers (H)	v	Melbourne Stars

North Sydney Oval, Sydney

Match 19
12 November 2026
15:40
Scorecard

Melbourne Stars (H)	v	Brisbane Heat

Junction Oval, Melbourne

Match 24
16 November 2026
19:10 (N)
Scorecard

Sydney Thunder (H)	v	Melbourne Stars

Drummoyne Oval, Sydney

Match 32
22 November 2026
19:10 (N)
Scorecard

Melbourne Stars (H)	v	Melbourne Renegades

Junction Oval, Melbourne

Match 35
26 November 2026
19:10 (N)
Scorecard

Sydney Sixers (H)	v	Melbourne Stars

North Sydney Oval, Sydney

Match 37
28 November 2026
15:40
Scorecard

Melbourne Renegades (H)	v	Melbourne Stars

Junction Oval, Melbourne

Match 40
29 November 2026
15:30
Scorecard

Adelaide Strikers (H)	v	Hobart Hurricanes

Karen Rolton Oval, Adelaide

== Standing ==
=== Points table ===
Pos	Team	Pld	W	L	NR	Pts	NRR	
1	Adelaide Strikers	0	0	0	0	0	—	Advanced to Final
2	Brisbane Heat	0	0	0	0	0	—	Advanced to Challenger
3	Hobart Hurricanes	0	0	0	0	0	—	Advanced to Knock-out
4	Melbourne Renegades	0	0	0	0	0	—	Advanced to Knock-out
5	Melbourne Stars	0	0	0	0	0	—	
6	Perth Scorchers	0	0	0	0	0	—	
7	Sydney Sixers	0	0	0	0	0	—	
8	Sydney Thunder	0	0	0	0	0	—	

Updated to match(es) played on unknown. Source: Cricinfo

=== Match summary ===
Team	League matches										Finals		
Team	1	2	3	4	5	6	7	8	9	10	QF/KO	Ch	F
Melbourne Stars													

Win	Loss	Tie	No result
