= T20 Spring Challenge =

Australian women's domestic Twenty20 cricket competition

- Countries: Australia
- Administrator: Cricket Australia
- Format: Twenty20
- First edition: 2024
- Latest edition: 2025
- Next edition: 2027
- Tournament format: 4 matches per side, then knockout finals
- Number of teams: 9
- Current champion: Sydney Sixers
- Most successful: Hobart Hurricanes (2 titles)
- Most runs: Madeline Penna (604)
- Most wickets: Sarah Coyte (20)
- TV: Seven Network; Fox Cricket
- Website: www.cricket.com.au
- 2026 T20 Spring Challenge

The T20 Spring Challenge is an Australian domestic women's Twenty20 cricket competition. Organised by Cricket Australia, the first edition of the tournament took place in 2024.

The competition features the eight Women's Big Bash League teams and the ACT Meteors. It runs before the Women's Big Bash League and acts as a warm up for the BBL. Hobart Hurricanes won the first two editions of the competition.

== History ==
The T20 Spring Challenge was introduced by Cricket Australia in 2024 as a domestic Women's Twenty20 Cricket competition. The tournament was established to maintain opportunities for domestic players after the Women's Big Bash League (WBBL) season was shortened from 14 matches to 10 matches per team. It also provided a competitive preparation tournament ahead of the WBBL season. The competition features the eight WBBL teams and the ACT Meteors.

The nine teams play four matches each, with the four teams finishing with the most points entering the knockout-stage of the competition. The first season of the league took place from 11 October to 20 October 2024, and featured 21 matches, all held in Sydney and Adelaide. Hobart Hurricanes and Brisbane Heat finished top of the group stage and advanced to the final, Brisbane defeating Adelaide Strikers by 38 runs and Hobart advancing after their match against Melbourne Stars was cut short due to rain – Hobart advancing having finished higher during the group stage. Hobart won the final by five wickets.

The second season took place in October 2025 with all matches held in Sydney. Hobart and Brisbane Heat once again finished top of the group stage and advanced to the final after both semi-final matches were abandoned due to rain. Hobart Hurricanes won the final by 88 runs.

The third season took take place in October 2026. In the final, Sydney Sixers defeated Perth Scorchers by 15 runs to win their first title.

== Teams ==
Team	Location (Note: Administrative and training base)	Titles won
ACT Meteors	Canberra, Australian Capital Territory	–
Adelaide Strikers	North Adelaide, South Australia	–
Brisbane Heat	Albion, Queensland	–
Hobart Hurricanes	Bellerive, Tasmania	2 (2024, 2025)
Melbourne Renegades	St Kilda, Victoria	–
Melbourne Stars	St Kilda, Victoria	–
Perth Scorchers	East Perth, Western Australia	–
Sydney Sixers	Moore Park, New South Wales	1 (2026)
Sydney Thunder	Sydney Olympic Park, New South Wales	–

== Tournament results ==
Season	Final			Venue	Player of the Season
Season	Winner	Result	Runners up	Venue	Player of the Season
2024	Hobart Hurricanes	Hobart Hurricanes won by 5 wickets Scorecard	Brisbane Heat	Cricket Central, Sydney	Tahlia Wilson (Sydney Thunder)
2025	Hobart Hurricanes	Hobart Hurricanes won by 88 runs Scorecard	Brisbane Heat	Cricket Central, Sydney	Maitlan Brown (Sydney Sixers); Madeline Penna (Adelaide Strikers)
2026	Sydney Sixers	Sydney Sixers won by 15 runs Scorecard	Perth Scorchers	Cricket Central, Sydney	Madeline Penna (Adelaide Strikers)

== Broadcasting ==
In July 2024, Fox Sports, announced it had acquired the global media rights for TV and digital broadcasts for the tournament. The initial season was broadcast in Australia on the Fox Sports TV channel and the Kayo Sports app.
