= Patrick Jackson =

Pat, Paddy or Patrick Jackson may refer to:

- Patrick Tracy Jackson (1780–1847), American manufacturer
- Pat Jackson (1916–2011), English film and television director
- Pat Jackson (footballer) (1924–1974), English inside forward
- Patrick Jackson (cricketer) (born 1984), Australian player for New South Wales
- Paddy Jackson (born 1992), Irish rugby player

== See also ==
- Patricia Jackson (born 1958), known as Pat, American gold medalist sprinter
- Patricia Jackson (Survivor), American contestant in February 2002
