= Mark McInnes =

Mark McInnes may refer to:

- Mark McInnes, Baron McInnes of Kilwinning, Scottish politician and member of the House of Lords
- Mark McInnes (rugby union), Australian international rugby union player
