= Anesu Mushangwe =

Zimbabwean cricketer

Personal information
- Full name: Anesu Catherine Mushangwe
- Born: 25 February 1996 (age 30); Harare, Zimbabwe
- Batting: Right-handed
- Bowling: Right-arm leg break
- Role: Bowler

International information
- National side: Zimbabwe
- T20I debut (cap 5): 5 January 2019 v Namibia
- Last T20I: 26 April 2022 v Namibia
- T20I shirt no.: 6

Domestic team information
- Years: Team
- 2022/23–present: Adelaide Strikers (squad no. 61)
- 2022/23–2023/24: South Australia (squad no. 47)
- 2024/25–present: Australian Capital Territory (squad no. 40)

Career statistics
Competition	WT20I	WLA	WT20
Matches	21	21	42
Runs scored	99	46	105
Batting average	16.50	7.66	15.00
100s/50s	0/0	0/0	0/0
Top score	22	13	22
Balls bowled	473	996	880
Wickets	33	26	56
Bowling average	7.42	28.00	12.51
5 wickets in innings	0	0	0
10 wickets in match	–	–	–
Best bowling	3/6	4/38	3/6
Catches/stumpings	4/–	5/–	11/–
- Source: CricketArchive, 20 October 2024

Anesu Catherine Mushangwe (born 25 February 1996) is a Zimbabwean cricketer who plays for the Zimbabwe women's national cricket team. She currently resides in Australia.

== Early life ==
Mushangwe first attended primary school in Greendale, before moving to Chinembiri. Her cricketing career began during her time at Seke One High School in Chitungwiza, where sport was compulsory. She began playing cricket to avoid competitive running, which she hated. She passed seven subjects successfully except for O-Level mathematics but found difficulties proceeding to A-level owing to financial constraints. She had aspirations to become a doctor but her dream was shattered when she failed the mathematics in her O-Level examination. She received her maiden callup to the national U-19 team in 2014 after a string of impressive performances at both school and district level.

She briefly stopped playing cricket for nearly two years and instead worked as a maid at a local pre-school to raise funds in order to continue her Advanced Level education. She then enrolled at the Midlands State University for a degree in International Relations after successfully completing her Advanced Level Studies. She initially played as a medium pace bowler but later switched to bowling leg-spin at the age of 20. She made the bold move as she couldn't generate much pace due to her height disadvantage.

== Domestic career ==
Following her graduation, she received an offer to play for Hursley Park Cricket Club in UK and later plied her trade with the Australian club Glenelg Cricket Club where she found more success.

=== UK ===
She had a short stint with Hursley Park Cricket Club and it was relatively a successful campaign for her after being voted as the Most Valuable Player as well as the Best Bowler Award.

=== Australia ===
She then moved to Australia in late 2019 and began playing in South Australian Premier Cricket and has been a vital cog of the Glenelg Cricket Club having played an influential part in helping the club's promotion in League A. Her all-round prowess inspired Glenelg District Cricket Club to earn promotion to SACA Premier Women's First Grade competition during the 2019-20 season. She ended the season with 302 runs at an impressive average of 75.50 and also grabbed 40 wickets at a remarkable average of 12.05. Due to her standout performances, she received several accolades including club's most outstanding player, the South Australia Lyn Fullstone Prize, Best Bowler at the club, MVP award as well as Best Bowler in the League during the 2020 South Australian Cricket Association awards ceremony.

In August 2021, she was named as the captain of the Glenelg club for the Premier League T20 season. She was also named in 2021-22 Premier Cricket Women’s Team of the Year for her stellar run as captain of Glenelg Club leading from the front in both batting and bowling aspects. During the 2021-22 Premier Cricket season, she was Glenelg's leading wicket-taker in both the Women's First-Grade and T20 competitions while also adjudged as the club's leading run-scorer in the 2021-22 T20 competition.

On 8 September 2022, she signed a landmark one year deal with Adelaide Strikers side to play in the 2022–23 Women's Big Bash League season and was approved as a local player for the Adelaide Strikers due to her permanent residence in Australia. She also became the first Zimbabwean ever to be contracted to play in the Women's Big Bash League. She later played for South Australia in the Women's National Cricket League.

== International career ==
She was initially included in Zimbabwean squad for the 2017 South Africa Women's Quadrangular Series but had to withdraw at the last minute as she did not have the passport to travel to South Africa. She was named in Zimbabwe's squad for the 2017 Women's Cricket World Cup Qualifier which was held in Sri Lanka.

She made her WT20I debut on 5 January 2019 against Namibia during the five match T20I bilateral series against Namibia in Namibia. She was instrumental in Zimbabwe's clean sweep over Namibia during that series as she was the joint leading wicket taker of the series with six scalps alongside her teammates Precious Marange and Nomatter Mutasa. She was part of the Zimbabwean team which won the 2019 Victoria Tri-Series where Zimbabwe thrashed Uganda in the final by 25 runs and she played vital cog in the final by picking up 3/12 in four overs to be adjudged as player of the final.

In May 2019, she was named in Zimbabwe's Women's Twenty20 International (WT20I) squad for 2019 ICC Women's Qualifier Africa tournament. Zimbabwe won the tournament by beating Namibia in the final convincingly by 50 runs and Mushangwe was the pick of the bowlers for Zimbabwe with 3/6 in her four over spell which set the tone for Zimbabwe in restricting Namibia to just 64/9 in a run chase of 115. She was also the leading wicket-taker of the 2019 ICC Women's Qualifier Africa with 10 scalps.

In July 2019, she was one of four Zimbabwe women cricketers barred by the International Cricket Council (ICC) from playing in a Global Development Squad, due to play against Women's Cricket Super League teams, following the ICC's suspension of Zimbabwe Cricket earlier in the month.

She was not able to represent Zimbabwe at international matches during the timeframe from 2019 to early 2022 due to visa issues. Her plans to return to Zimbabwe in April 2020 had to be shelved due to the COVID-19 pandemic restrictions and decided to remain in Australia. During her stay in Australia, she also pursued coaching badges by completing Level O which is the introduction to the cricket, Level 1 community coaching course and the representative coaching part of the Level 2 certificate.

In April 2022, after a three year hiatus, she returned to Zimbabwean squad for the 2022 Capricorn Women's Tri-Series and played a pivotal role in helping her team to win the triangular tournament. Zimbabwe thrashed hosts Namibia by seven wickets to win the tournament on the back of a hat-trick and fifer by Nomvelo Sibanda in the final. She was Zimbabwe's leading wicket-taker during that series with 10 scalps.
