= Lily Bassingthwaighte =

Australian cricketer

Personal information
- Full name: Lily Ava Bassingthwaighte
- Born: 25 March 2007 (age 19)
- Batting: Right-handed
- Bowling: Right-arm fast-medium
- Role: All-rounder

Domestic team information
- Years: Team
- 2024/25–present: Brisbane Heat
- 2024/25–present: Queensland Fire

Career statistics
Competition	WLA	WT20
Matches	2	5
Runs scored	-	7
Batting average	-	7.00
100s/50s	0/0	0/0
Top score	-	4*
Balls bowled	36	42
Wickets	0	1
Bowling average	-	61.00
5 wickets in innings	0	0
10 wickets in match	0	0
Best bowling	0/11	1/9
Catches/stumpings	-/–	1/–
- Source: ESPNcricinfo, 21 January 2025

Lily Ava Bassingthwaighte (born 25 March 2007) is an Australian cricketer who plays for the Brisbane Heat and Queensland Fire. She plays as a right-arm fast-medium bowler and a right-handed batter. She attended the All Hallows' School in Brisbane.

== Career ==
In October 2024, she was signed to the Brisbane Heat ahead of T20 Spring Challenge playing five games.

In December 2024, Bassingthwaighte was named as part of Australia's squad for the 2025 Under-19 Women's T20 World Cup.
