= Olivia Porter (cricketer) =

Australian cricketer (born 2001)

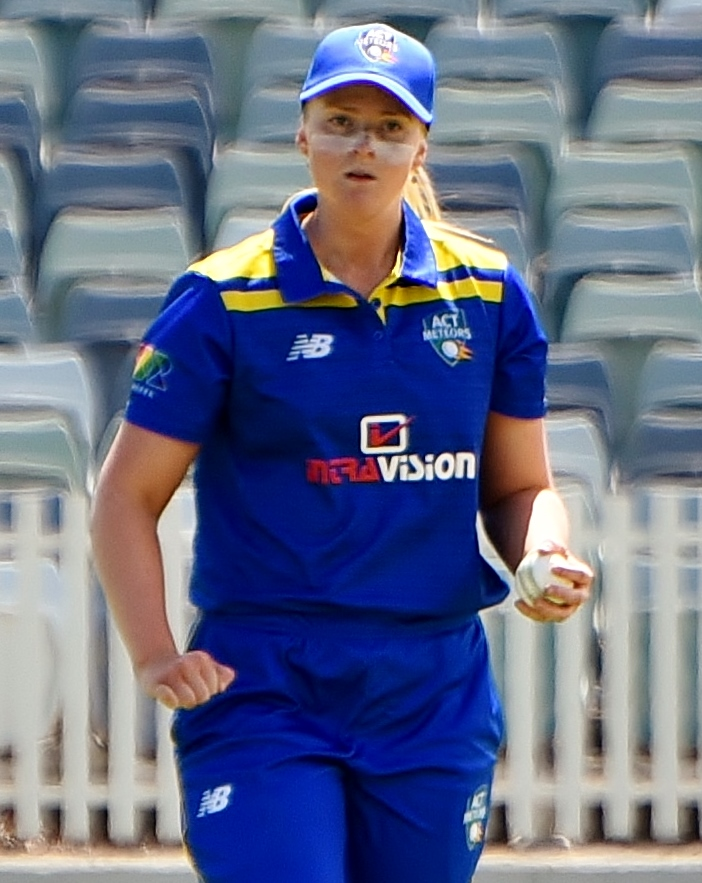
- Porter playing for the ACT in September 2022

Personal information
- Full name: Olivia K Porter
- Born: 14 November 2001 (age 24)
- Batting: Right-handed
- Bowling: Right-arm medium
- Role: All-rounder

Domestic team information
- Years: Team
- 2020/21–present: Sydney Thunder
- 2020/21–present: Australian Capital Territory

Career statistics
Competition	WLA	WT20
Matches	51	25
Runs scored	1,024	195
Batting average	21.33	16.25
100s/50s	1/3	0/1
Top score	107	57*
Balls bowled	282	24
Wickets	4	0
Bowling average	78.25	-
5 wickets in innings	0	0
10 wickets in match	0	0
Best bowling	1/21	0/10
Catches/stumpings	10/–	7/–
- Source: CricketArchive, 18 March 2026

Olivia Kate Porter (born 14 November 2001) is an Australian cricketer who plays for the ACT Meteors in the Women's National Cricket League (WNCL) and the Sydney Thunder in the Women's Big Bash League (WBBL). An all-rounder, she bowls right-arm medium pace and bats right-handed.

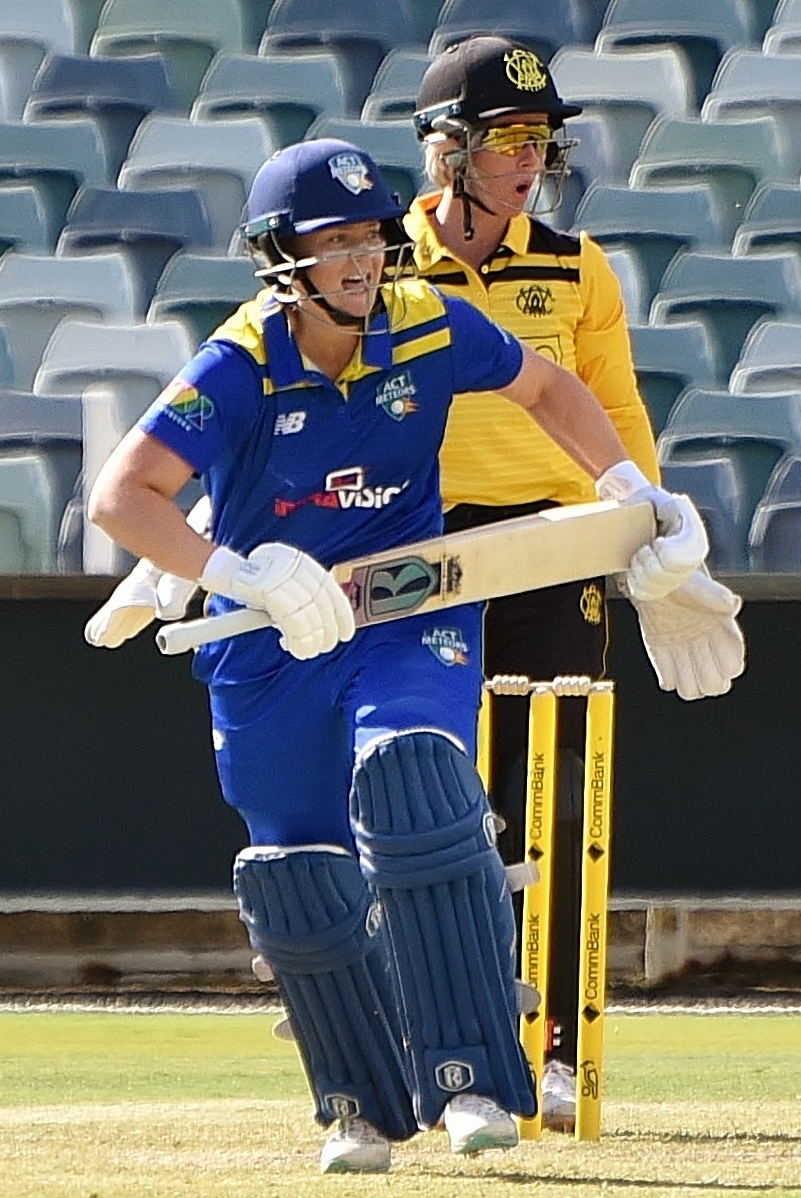
Porter batting for the ACT in September 2022

Porter was signed by the Thunder ahead of the 2020–21 WBBL but was subsequently ruled out of the tournament due to a leg injury. However, she made her Meteors debut on 30 January 2021 in a 2020–21 WNCL match against Queensland Fire. She played six matches in the tournament, scoring 39 runs and taking one wicket.
