= Mikayla Friday =

Australian cricketer (born 1998)

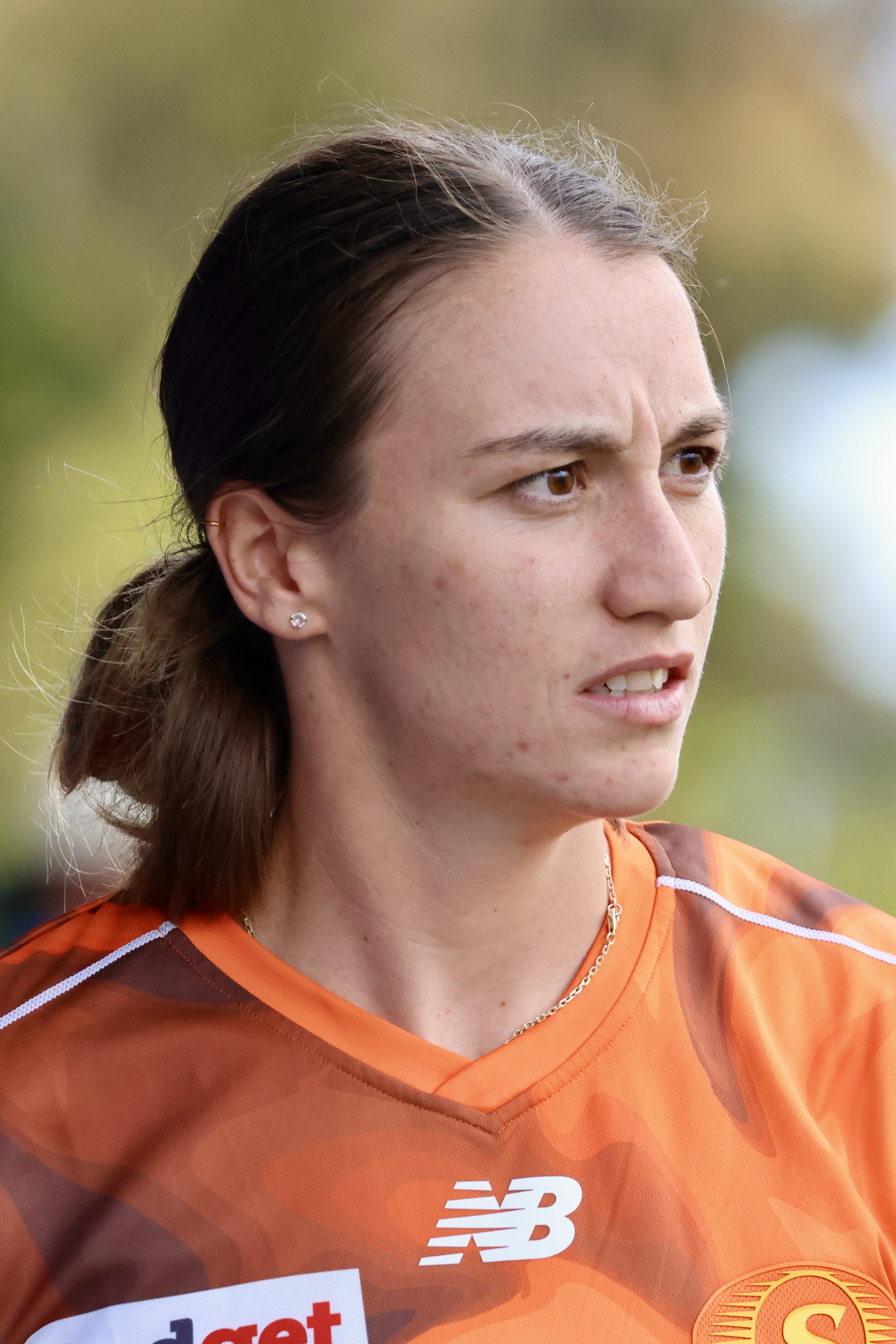
- Hinkley in 2025

Personal information
- Full name: Mikayla Carolyn Friday (née Hinkley)
- Born: 1 May 1998 (age 28); Penrith, New South Wales, Australia
- Batting: Right-handed
- Bowling: Right-arm medium
- Role: Batter

Domestic team information
- Years: Team
- 2015/16–2016/17: Sydney Thunder
- 2016/17–2018/19: New South Wales
- 2017/18: Perth Scorchers
- 2018/19: Hobart Hurricanes
- 2019-2024: Queensland
- 2019-2024: Brisbane Heat
- 2024-present: Perth Scorchers
- 2024-present: Western Australia

Career statistics
Competition	WLA	WT20
Matches	72	87
Runs scored	1,747	656
Batting average	32.96	14.26
100s/50s	1/12	0/0
Top score	121*	49*
Balls bowled	54	–
Wickets	1	–
Bowling average	45.00	–
5 wickets in innings	0	–
10 wickets in match	0	–
Best bowling	1/6	–
Catches/stumpings	29/–	30/–
- Source: CricketArchive, 12 February 2026

Mikayla Carolyn Friday (née Hinkley) (born 1 May 1998) is an Australian cricketer who plays as a right-handed batter and occasional right-arm medium bowler for Western Australia in the Women's National Cricket League (WNCL) and Perth Scorchers in the Women's Big Bash League (WBBL). She previously played for New South Wales Breakers, making her debut in 2016, before joining Queensland ahead of the 2019–20 WNCL season. In the WBBL, she has previously played two seasons for the Sydney Thunder, one season for the Hobart Hurricanes and five seasons with Brisbane Heat. She is the first WBBL player to play for 4 clubs since the league's inception in 2015.

Hinkley has indigenous heritage. In November 2018, she was selected as part of the first female Indigenous Sydney Thunder team. In the same month, she was named in the Women's Global Development Squad, to play fixtures against WBBL clubs.

In 2024, Hinkley relocated from Queensland to Western Australia and signed a two-year deal with the Perth Scorchers and Western Australia women's cricket team.
