= Chloe Ainsworth =

Australian cricketer

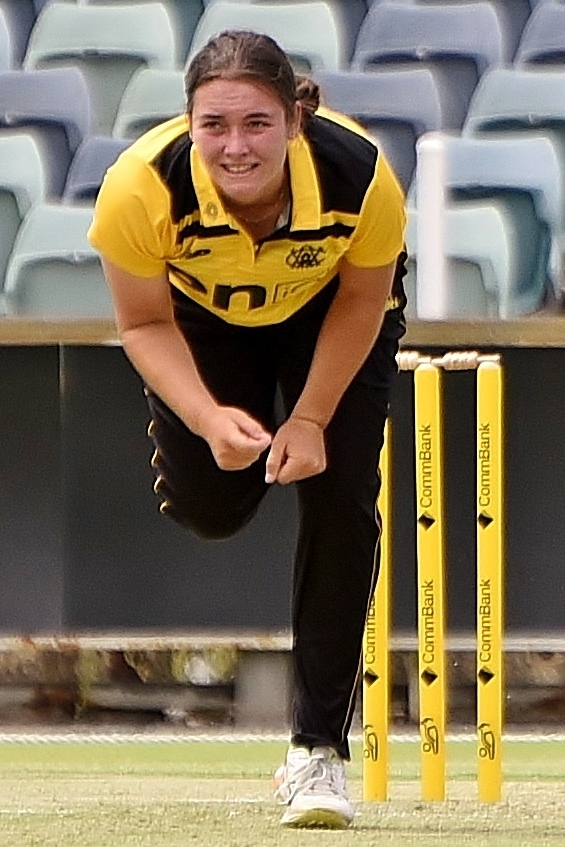
- Ainsworth bowling for WA in December 2022

Personal information
- Full name: Chloe Cathryn Ainsworth
- Born: 14 September 2005 (age 21)
- Batting: Right-handed
- Bowling: Right-arm medium
- Role: Bowler

Domestic team information
- Years: Team
- 2022/23–present: Western Australia
- 2023/24–present: Perth Scorchers

Career statistics
Competition	WLA	WT20
Matches	16	38
Runs scored	175	165
Batting average	21.87	13.75
100s/50s	0/0	0/0
Top score	42	41
Balls bowled	601	804
Wickets	14	41
Bowling average	36.07	22.58
5 wickets in innings	0	0
10 wickets in match	0	0
Best bowling	4/45	3/22
Catches/stumpings	5/–	14/–
- Source: CricketArchive, 25 January 2026

Chloe Cathryn Ainsworth (born 14 September 2005) is an Australian cricketer who currently plays for Western Australia in the Women's National Cricket League (WNCL) and Perth Scorchers in the Women's Big Bash League (WBBL). She plays as a right-arm medium bowler.

== Domestic career ==
In December 2022, Ainsworth played for Western Australia in the Cricket Australia Under-19 National Female Championships, scoring one half-century and taking 10 wickets. On 21 December 2022, Ainsworth made her debut for Western Australia's senior team, bowling four overs.

Ainsworth plays grade cricket for Melville Cricket Club.

== International career ==
In December 2022, Ainsworth was named in the Australia Under-19 squad for the 2023 ICC Under-19 Women's T20 World Cup. She played one match at the tournament, taking two wickets, before being forced to withdraw due to injury.
