= Frankie Nicklin =

Australian cricketer (born 2005)

Personal information
- Full name: Frankie H Nicklin
- Born: 20 January 2005 (age 21)
- Batting: Right-handed
- Bowling: Right-arm off break
- Role: All-rounder

Domestic team information
- Years: Team
- 2022/23–present: New South Wales

Career statistics
Competition	WLA	WT20
Matches	3	4
Runs scored	26	30
Batting average	8.67	-
100s/50s	0/0	0/0
Top score	24	20*
Balls bowled	24	68
Wickets	0	3
Bowling average	–	30.67
5 wickets in innings	0	0
10 wickets in match	0	0
Best bowling	–	2/25
Catches/stumpings	0/–	1/-
- Source: CricketArchive, 20 January 2023

Frankie H Nicklin (born 20 January 2005) is an Australian cricketer who plays for New South Wales in the Women's National Cricket League (WNCL). She plays as a right-arm off break bowler and right-handed batter.

== Domestic career ==
In the summer of 2022, Nicklin played club cricket with the Finchampstead club in England, as well as appearing in friendlies for the Berkshire Women cricket team.

In January 2023, Nicklin made her debut for New South Wales, against South Australia in the Women's National Cricket League. Playing for Sydney University in NSW Premier Cricket in 2025–26, she scored 565 runs at an average of 40.79, and took 26 wickets at 13.04, and was named Women's First Grade Player of the Year.
