= Allan Border Field =

Cricket ground

Coordinates: 27°26′7″S 153°2′46″E

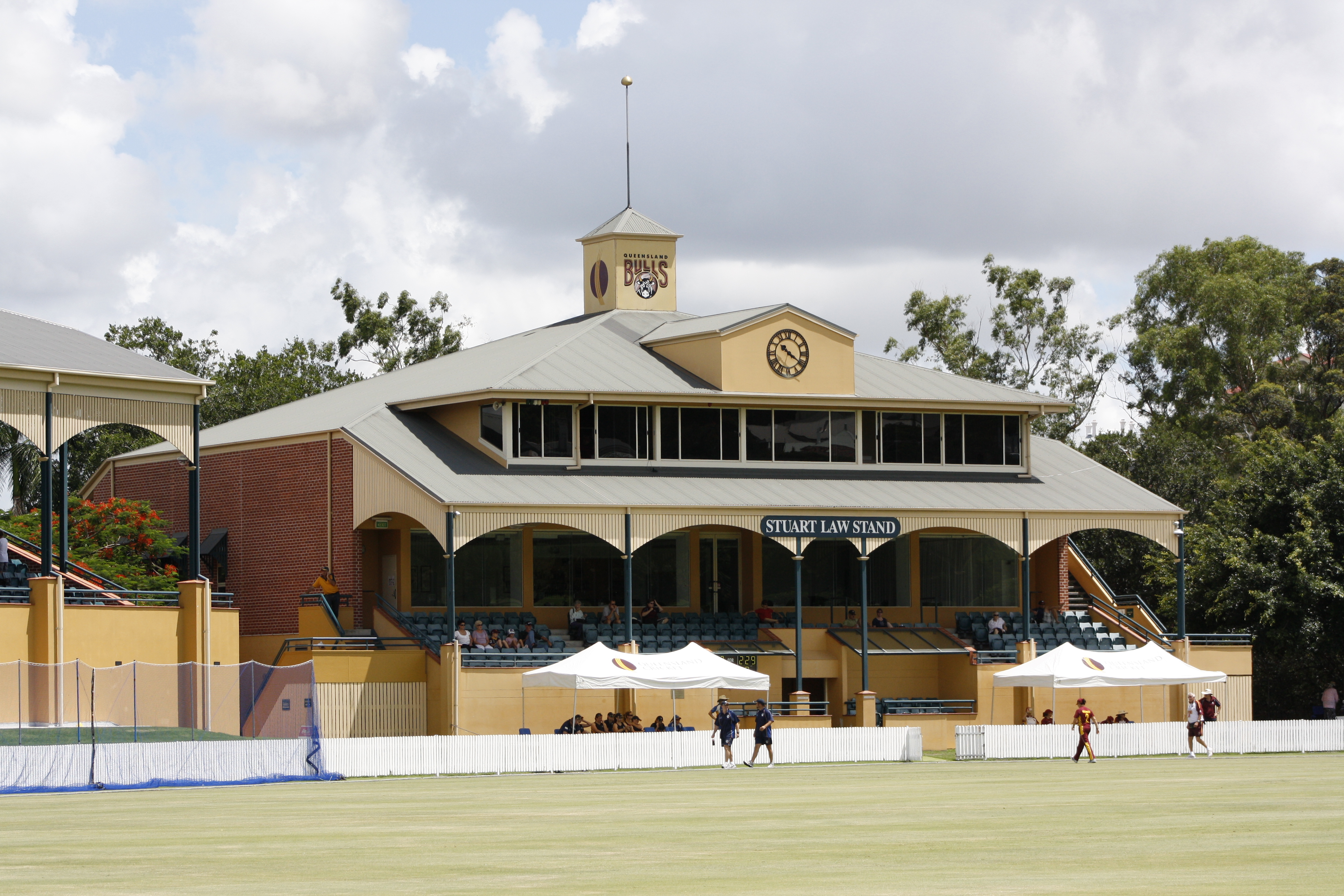
- The Stuart Law stand at Allan Border Field
- Interactive map of Allan Border Field

Ground information
- Location: Albion, Brisbane, Australia
- Country: Australia
- Home club: Queensland Bulls; Queensland Fire; Cricket Australia XI
- Capacity: 6,500
- Owner: Queensland Government
- Tenants: Fortitude Valley Diehards (1909–95); Queensland Bulls; Queensland Fire; Cricket Australia XI; Southern Stars; Australia A National Performance Squad
- End names
- Crosby Road End; Albion Park End

International information
- First women's ODI: 7 February 1999: Australia v South Africa
- Last women's ODI: 8 October 2023: Australia v West Indies
- First women's T20I: 18 October 2006: Australia v New Zealand
- Last women's T20I: 24 September 2024: Australia v New Zealand
- As of 24 September 2024; Source: ESPNcricinfo

Allan Border Field is a cricket ground in the Brisbane suburb of Albion in Queensland, Australia. The Australian Cricket Academy has been based at the oval since 2004, using it as a base for the development of elite cricketers throughout Australia.

It was formerly known as Neumann Oval and was home to the Fortitude Valley Diehards rugby league team from 1909 until 1995. The oval was named after Fred "Firpo" Neumann, Valley's club captain (and later president) and Queensland and Australian representative footballer. Queensland Cricket purchased the ground not long after Valley's relocation and named it in honour of former Australian cricket captain Allan Border. The ground is used as a training facility for the Queensland Bulls and more recently the Australian cricket team. The capacity of the ground is 6,300, which is much smaller than the Gabba. It is also used as a home venue for the Queensland Bulls and Cricket Australia XI in Australian domestic cricket.

== History ==
=== Rugby League ===
First grade rugby league was played at the ground between 1960 and 1995 by the Fortitude Valley Diehards in the Brisbane Rugby League competition. The club won 15 titles during their tenure in the league, the most of any club, and produced future Queensland captain and immortal Wally Lewis.

=== Cricket ===
The first first-class match held at the ground was played between Queensland and a touring Pakistan team in 1999 during which both Matthew Hayden and Stuart Law made centuries as Queensland won the match by 112 runs.

The venue hosted Australian domestic and List A matches in the early-2000s, including the 1999/00 Pura Cup Final but, in later years, was restricted to tour matches between Queensland and international teams, with the Gabba becoming the primary home of the Queensland Bulls.

In 2009, Pakistan A won in a three-match one-day series against Australia A but, lost the subsequent Twenty20 match.

Sheffield Shield was re-introduced in 2010 with a match played between Queensland and South Australia and more games have been played since, including a match in 2013 between Queensland and Tasmania during which Jordan Silk made a century.

In 2014, two four-day matches were played between Australia A and a touring India A team. Naman Ojha made a double-century in one of the matches. Mitchell Marsh, who scored 211, and Sam Whiteman, who scored 174, put on 371 runs for the eighth wicket, an Australian record and the second-highest eighth-wicket partnership recorded. Both matches resulted in a draw.

On 23 June 2014 it was announced that the field would jointly play host to the initial rounds of the newly sponsored Matador BBQs One-Day Cup in October. In the first match, Josh Hazlewood took 7 for 36 against South Australia, the third-best bowling performance in Australian domestic one-day history and the best by a New South Welshman. Four days later, Jonathan Wells made the second-highest score in List A cricket at Allan Border Field, becoming just the fourth batsman to make a century in List A cricket at the ground. In the same match Sam Rainbird took figures of 5 for 29. However, in the last match, Queenslander Joe Burns made 115 against South Australia in a 94-run victory, passing Wells' score and becoming the fifth batsman to make a century in List A cricket at the ground.

On 8 July 2015 Victorian all-rounder Marcus Stoinis hit part-time medium-pacer Brendan Smith for six sixes in an over on his way to 121 from 73 balls while playing for the National Performance Squad in a 50-over match against a National Indigenous Squad. Smith, captain of the New South Wales under-17s, also sent down a wide meaning his one over of the match went for 37 runs. The game was a non-sanctioned practice match.

On 23–27 March 2018 the Sheffield Shield final was played at the ground between Queensland Bulls and Tasmania Tigers the match was won by Queensland by 9 wickets it was Queensland's 8th title and first since 2011–12 Sheffield Shield season

On 26–30 September 2020 Allan Border Field hosted Women's Twenty20 International matches between the Australia women's national cricket team and the New Zealand women's national cricket team. Australia won the series 2–1 with New Zealand winning the final match of the tournament. The matches were originally scheduled to be held at Cazalys Stadium in Cairns, however, the matches were relocated to the Allan Border Field due to the prevailing COVID-19 circumstances and logistical issues at the time.

On 15–18 April 2021 Allan Border Field hosted the Sheffield Shield final match between the Queensland and New South Wales men's cricket teams. Queensland had won the match by an innings and 33 runs. Over 10,000 people attended across three and a half days of cricket, with hundreds of fans having to be turned away when the cricket ground reached its maximum capacity on day two.

== Records ==
=== First Class cricket ===
This table contains the top five highest scores made by a batsman in a single innings.

Season	Player	Team	Score	Opponent
2005/06	Marlon Samuels	West Indies	257	Queensland
2002/03	Martin Love	Queensland	250	England XI
2000/01	Ricky Ponting	Tasmania	233	Queensland
2014	Naman Ojha	India A	219*	Australia A
2014	Mitchell Marsh	Australia A	211	India A

Last Updated 10 July 2014.

=== List A cricket ===
This table contains the top five highest scores made by a batsman in List A matches.

Season	Player	Team	Score	Opponent
2009	Tim Paine	Australia A	134	Pakistan A
2014	Joe Burns	Queensland	115	South Australia
2014	Jonathan Wells	Tasmania	110	Victoria
2009	Umar Akmal	Pakistan A	104	Australia A
2009	Khalid Latif	Pakistan A	100	Australia A

Last Updated 15 July 2015.

== National Cricket Centre ==
Cricket Australia officially opened the new National Cricket Centre on 12 November 2013. The new facility replaced the Centre of Excellence. The National Cricket Centre features state-of-the-art indoor and outdoor training facilities and equipment to enhance the development of Australian cricketers. The street that the Allan Border Field is on was also renamed in honour of former Australian captain Greg Chappell.

== See also ==
- List of sports venues named after individuals
