= Drummoyne Oval =

Sports ground of Sydney, Australia

Coordinates: 33°51′4″S 151°09′0″E

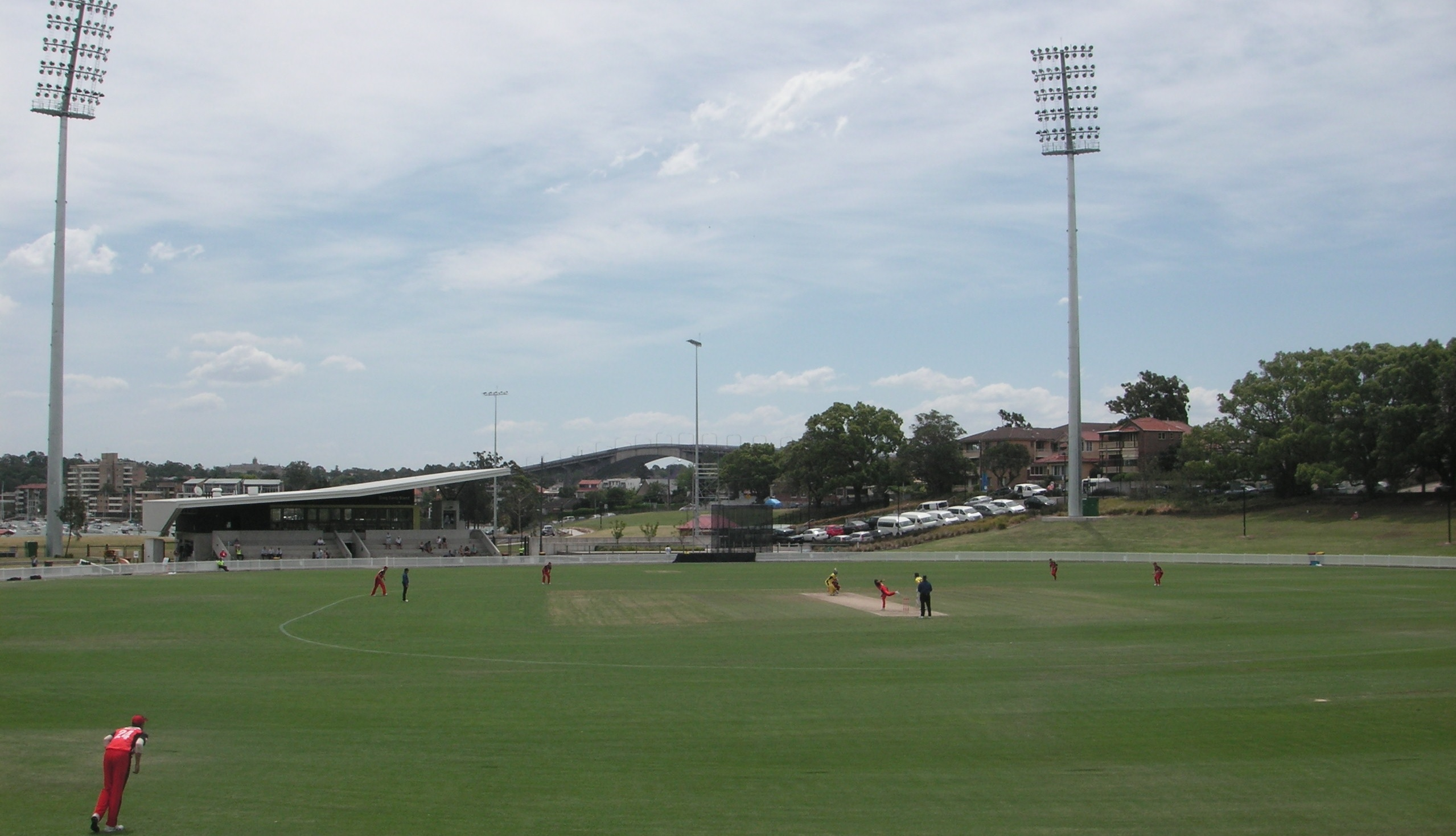
- Interactive map of Drummoyne Oval
- Location: Drummoyne, New South Wales
- Capacity: 5,500
- Surface: Grass

Construction
- Opened: 1931

Tenants
- Balmain (NSWRL) (1932–1934); Sydney Thunder (WBBL) (2024–present); GWS Giants (AFLW) (2018–present)

Ground information

International information
- First women's ODI: 7 February 2008: Australia v England
- Last women's ODI: 21 March 2009: Pakistan v West Indies
- As of 7 September 2020; Source: Cricinfo

Drummoyne Oval is a multi-use sports ground in the Sydney inner-west suburb of Drummoyne, New South Wales. The ground has been used for international women's cricket matches, domestic men's cricket matches and first grade rugby league as well as local Australian rules football and Rugby Union games.

The stadium has a capacity of 5,500 people and opened in 1931.

== Usage ==
Between 1932 and 1934, Balmain played their home games at the ground before moving to Leichhardt Oval. The final first grade game to be played at the ground was in 1950 when Balmain defeated Eastern Suburbs 20–11.

In 1995, the ground hosted an Under 19s cricket test match between Australia, featuring a young Brett Lee, and India while in the 2009 Women's Cricket World Cup, five games were played there. The Sydney Sixers played a match against the SCG XI in 2012–2013, which was the first night cricket match under lights at the ground. Two Ryobi Cup Cricket matches were played at Drummoyne in 2013, including a match between New South Wales and South Australia under lights. Five Domestic One Day Cup cricket matches were scheduled to be played at Drummoyne Oval in October 2014, including three matches involving New South Wales, as well as the elimination final.

The Sydney Cricket Club, formerly known as UTS Balmain, and Balmain, uses Drummoyne Oval as its home ground.

== Cricket ==
The ground is currently used mostly for cricket matches during the summer; and during winter it is home to Drummoyne Rugby Club and the Drummoyne Power Junior Australian Football Club. The Balmain Australian Football Club in the Sydney AFL competition formerly used the ground, prior to moving to Henson Park, Marrickville, for their home games. It was used for four games in the 2019–20 Women's Big Bash League season. During the 2020-21 Women's Big Bash League season, which was played in a Sydney hub for its entirety, Drummoyne Oval was used for 10 matches of the 59-game season. No matches were played on the weekend during the 2020-21 Women's Big Bash League season at Drummoyne Oval. During the 2020-21 Indian Tour of Australia, an Australia A v India A 3-day tour match was played at Drummoyne Oval.

The Sydney Thunder team in the Women's Big Bash League, currently in 2024, play their home matches at Drummoyne.

=== Test Eleven versus John Benaud's Eleven ===
One of the largest crowds at Drummoyne Oval was on 8 October 1972, when an estimated 20,000 attended a one day cricket match. Well known players included Greg Chappell, Richie Benaud, Doug Walters and Dennis Lillee.

John Benaud's team won by one wicket.
