= List of 2026–27 Women's Big Bash League personnel signings =

2026–27 Women's Big Bash League personnel signings

General information
- Sport: Cricket
- Date: 27 August to October 2026

Overview
- League: Women's Big Bash League
- Team: 8

This is a list of personnel signings for the 2026–27 Women's Big Bash League season cricket tournament.

== Background ==
Each team is allowed to sign an 15-player squad, including a maximum of 10 players signed before 27 August 2026. Teams are allowed to sign additional replacement players in the instance that one of their players is unavailable. Following the removal of the International Player Draft, teams are able to sign foreign players directly.

England leg-spinner Sarah Glenn joined the Brisbane Heat, Sophia Dunkley will return to the Sydney Sixers, Hayley Matthews to return to the Melbourne Renegades, Orla Prendergast signing with the Brisbane Heat, Sophie Ecclestone set for second straight season with the Adelaide Strikers, Heather Knight signing a new one-year deal with the Sydney Thunder, Amy Jones and Dani Gibson both return to the Melbourne Stars on one-year deals while Marizanne Kapp opts to not see out her final year with them due to international duties, Alice Capsey joins the Sydney Sixers after two years with the Melbourne Renegades. Ella Hayward signing a two-year deal with the Hobart Hurricanes Deandra Dottin to return to the Melbourne Renegades Ruby Strange has re-signed with the Perth Scorchers. England vice-captain Charlie Dean signing with the Melbourne Stars. Lucy Finn signing another two seasons with the Sydney Thunder Sydney Sixers fan-favourite Erin Burns has re-signed for WBBL|12. Danni Wyatt-Hodge and Linsey Smith will return to the Hobart Hurricanes. Adelaide Strikers sign England star Maia Bouchier for WBBL|12. Defending champions Hobart Hurricanes have re-signed Lauren Smith and Ruth Johnston. Melbourne Renegades have boosted their pace stocks, re-signing Tayla Vlaeminck and Sara Kennedy. Perth Scorchers re-signed a rising England allrounder Freya Kemp. Adelaide Strikers have re-signed power-hitter Madeline Penna for WBBL|12. The legendary Sophie Devine returns for a seventh season with the Perth Scorchers. Chinelle Henry signing with the Hobart Hurricanes. Sydney Thunder have secured a major signing allrounder Nicola Hancock. Frankie Nicklin signing with the Sydney Sixers. Brisbane Heat signing local quartet Batters Annie O'Neil and Lucy Bourke, wicketkeeper-batter Mikayla Wrigley and pace bowler Bonnie Berry for WBBL|12. Perth Scorchers signing Pakistan captain Fatima Sana. Wicketkeeper-batter Maddy Darke is returning to Sydney Sixers. Allrounder Jemma Barsby signing with Sydney Thunder. Adelaide Strikers signing Emma de Broughe. Veteran bowler Sarah Coyte will make her return to the Sydney Sixers. Nineteen-year-old Zoe Samuel signing with the Melbourne Stars. Melbourne Renegades have added ACT Meteors pair Annie Wikman and Olivia Porter. Bowlers Georgia Prestwidge and Maisy Gibson will go around for another season in green, re-signing with Melbourne Stars. Spinner Grace Parsons will return to the Brisbane Heat for WBBL|12. Sydney Thunder have secured a major signing England's Lauren Bell. South African allrounder Chloe Tryon signing a one-year deal with the Melbourne Renegades. Wicketkeeper-batter Sophie Reid has switched allegiances from the Melbourne Stars to the Melbourne Renegades. Perth Scorchers re-signing batters Chloe Piparo and Mikayla Hinkley for WBBL|12. Fan-favourite Anesu Mushangwe re-signing with Adelaide Strikers. Adelaide Strikers have re-signed fast bowler Ella Wilson for WBBL|12. Carly Leeson will return to the Melbourne Stars. Naomi Stalenberg has made the move to cross-town rivals Melbourne Stars from Melbourne Renegades for WBBL|12. Sydney Thunder have finalised their overseas contingent for WBBL|12 after signing South Africa allrounder Nadine de Klerk. Chamari Athapaththu will join Hobart Hurricanes for WBBL|12. Brisbane Heat have finalised their WBBL|12 squad after signing 19-year-old fast bowler Catherine White. Adelaide Strikers have announced South Australia allrounder Maggie Clark as their 15th and final signing for WBBL|12. Sydney Thunder have finalised their Squads for WBBL|12, signing 22-year-old Claire Moore. Western Australians Ines McKeon and Taneale Peschel have committed to the Perth Scorchers for WBBL|12. The Melbourne Renegades have finalised their Squads after signing Lucy Wilson for WBBL|12. Tia Davidge has joined the Melbourne Stars for WBBL|12, marking the final signing. New Zealander Maddy Green has swooped in as a last-minute replacement for the Hobart Hurricanes.

== Pre-signed ==
Contracted for WBBL |12
Adelaide Strikers	Brisbane Heat	Hobart Hurricanes	Melbourne Renegades	Melbourne Stars	Perth Scorchers	Sydney Sixers	Sydney Thunder
Darcie Brown; Ellie Johnston; Eleanor Larosa; Tahlia McGrath; Bridget Patterson; Megan Schutt; Amanda-Jade Wellington; Laura Wolvaardt (SA)	Lily Bassingthwaighte; Sianna Ginger; Lucy Hamilton; Grace Harris; Jess Jonassen; Charli Knott; Georgia Redmayne	Nicola Carey; Heather Graham; Lizelle Lee; Hayley Silver-Holmes; Amy Smith; Molly Strano; Rachel Trenaman; Callie Wilson	Nicole Faltum; Tess Flintoff; Milly Illingworth; Sophie Molineux; Georgia Wareham; Courtney Webb	Sophie Day; Kim Garth; Meg Lanning; Rhys McKenna; Indigo Noble; Annabel Sutherland (c)	Chloe Ainsworth; Amy Edgar; Ebony Hoskin; Alana King; Katie Mack; Lilly Mills; Beth Mooney	Caoimhe Bray; Maitlan Brown; Lauren Cheatle; Ashleigh Gardner; Elsa Hunter; Amelia Kerr (NZ); Ellyse Perry; Courtney Sippel	Samantha Bates; Hannah Darlington; Hasrat Gill; Laura Harris; Anika Learoyd; Phoebe Litchfield; Georgia Voll; Tahlia Wilson

As of 26 August 2026

Notes

- Unless otherwise specified, all players are Australian.

== Direct signings ==
The following players were directly signed by teams ahead of the 2026–27 season.

Player	Team	Ref.
Ella Hayward	Hobart Hurricanes	
Ruby Strange	Perth Scorchers	
Lucy Finn	Sydney Thunder	
Erin Burns	Sydney Sixers	
Lauren Smith	Hobart Hurricanes	
Ruth Johnston	Hobart Hurricanes	
Tayla Vlaeminck	Melbourne Renegades	
Sara Kennedy	Melbourne Renegades	
Madeline Penna	Adelaide Strikers	
Nicola Hancock	Sydney Thunder	
Frankie Nicklin	Sydney Sixers	
Annie O'Neil	Brisbane Heat	
Lucinda Bourke	Brisbane Heat	
Mikayla Wrigley	Brisbane Heat	
Bonnie Berry	Brisbane Heat	
Maddy Darke	Sydney Sixers	
Jemma Barsby	Sydney Thunder	
Emma de Broughe	Adelaide Strikers	
Sarah Coyte	Sydney Sixers	
Zoe Samuel	Melbourne Stars	
Annie Wikman	Melbourne Renegades	
Olivia Porter	Melbourne Renegades	
Maisy Gibson	Melbourne Stars	
Georgia Prestwidge	Melbourne Stars	
Grace Parsons	Brisbane Heat	
Sophie Reid	Melbourne Renegades	
Chloe Piparo	Perth Scorchers	
Mikayla Hinkley	Perth Scorchers	
Anesu Mushangwe	Adelaide Strikers	
Ella Wilson	Adelaide Strikers	
Carly Leeson	Melbourne Stars	
Naomi Stalenberg	Melbourne Stars	
Grace Lyons	Sydney Sixers	
Kate Pelle	Hobart Hurricanes	
Maggie Clark	Adelaide Strikers	
Catherine White	Brisbane Heat	
Claire Moore	Sydney Thunder	
Ines McKeon	Perth Scorchers	
Taneale Peschel	Perth Scorchers	
Lucy Wilson	Melbourne Renegades	
Tia Davidge	Melbourne Stars	

== Overseas signings ==
The following players were directly signed by teams ahead of the 2026–27 season.

Overseas signings for the 2026–27 Women's Big Bash League season
Player	Nationality	Team	Ref.
Sarah Glenn	England	Brisbane Heat	
Sophia Dunkley	England	Sydney Sixers	
Hayley Matthews	West Indies	Melbourne Renegades	
Orla Prendergast	Ireland	Brisbane Heat	
Sophie Ecclestone	England	Adelaide Strikers	
Heather Knight	England	Sydney Thunder	
Amy Jones	England	Melbourne Stars	
Dani Gibson	England	Melbourne Stars	
Alice Capsey	England	Sydney Sixers	
Deandra Dottin	West Indies	Melbourne Renegades	
Charlie Dean	England	Melbourne Stars	
Linsey Smith	England	Hobart Hurricanes	
Danni Wyatt-Hodge	England	Hobart Hurricanes	
Maia Bouchier	England	Adelaide Strikers	
Freya Kemp	England	Perth Scorchers	
Sophie Devine	New Zealand	Perth Scorchers	
Chinelle Henry	West Indies	Hobart Hurricanes	
Fatima Sana	Pakistan	Perth Scorchers	
Lauren Bell	England	Sydney Thunder	
Chloe Tryon	South Africa	Melbourne Renegades	
Nadine de Klerk	South Africa	Sydney Thunder	
Chamari Athapaththu	Sri Lanka	Hobart Hurricanes	
Yastika Bhatia	India	Brisbane Heat	
Maddy Green	New Zealand	Hobart Hurricanes	

== See also ==
- List of 2026–27 Big Bash League personnel signings
