= 2025–26 Women's Big Bash League season =

Cricket tournament

2025–26 Women's Big Bash League
- Dates: 9 November – 13 December 2025
- Administrator: Cricket Australia
- Cricket format: Twenty20
- Tournament format(s): Double round-robin and knockout finals
- Champions: Hobart Hurricanes (1st title)
- Runners-up: Perth Scorchers
- Participants: 8
- Matches: 43
- Player of the series: Georgia Wareham (MLR)
- Most runs: Meg Lanning (MLS) – 579
- Most wickets: Ashleigh Gardner (SYS) – 19; Georgia Wareham (MLR) – 19
- Official website: WBBL

The 2025–26 Women's Big Bash League season or WBBL|11 (also known as Weber Women's Big Bash League 2025 for sponsorship reasons) was the 11th season of the Women's Big Bash League (WBBL), the semi-professional women's Twenty20 domestic cricket competition in Australia. The tournament was started on 9 November 2025, with the Hobart Hurricanes victorious in the final held on 13 December 2025.

The Melbourne Renegades were the defending champions, but failed to qualify during the regular season.

== Background ==
On 11 July 2025, it was announced that the 11th season of the tournament would begin on 9 November 2024, six days after the conclusion of the 2025 Women's Cricket World Cup.

== Draft ==
The 2024–25 season players draft was held on 19 June 2025.

Table of international draft selections
Pick	Team	Player	National team	Notes
Round 1
1	Sydney Sixers	Sophia Dunkley	England	
2	Adelaide Strikers	Sophie Ecclestone	England	
3	Brisbane Heat	Jemimah Rodrigues	India	Retention pick
4	Hobart Hurricanes	Danni Wyatt	England	Retention pick
5	Melbourne Stars	Amy Jones	England	
6	Sydney Thunder	Heather Knight	England	Retention pick
7	Melbourne Renegades	Hayley Matthews	West Indies	Retention pick; Withdrew
8	Perth Scorchers	Sophie Devine	New Zealand	Pre-signed player
Round 2
9	Sydney Sixers	Amelia Kerr	New Zealand	Pre-signed player
10	Adelaide Strikers	Laura Wolvaardt	South Africa	Pre-signed player
11	Melbourne Stars	Marizanne Kapp	South Africa	Pre-signed player
12	Perth Scorchers	Paige Scholfield	England	
13	Hobart Hurricanes	Nat Sciver-Brunt	England	
14	Sydney Thunder	Chamari Athapaththu	Sri Lanka	Pre-signed player
15	Melbourne Renegades	Alice Capsey	England	
16	Brisbane Heat	Passed		
Round 3
17	Brisbane Heat	Chinelle Henry	West Indies	
18	Melbourne Renegades	Passed		
19	Sydney Thunder	Shabnim Ismail	South Africa	
20	Hobart Hurricanes	Linsey Smith	England	
21	Perth Scorchers	Chloe Tryon	South Africa	Withdrew
22	Melbourne Stars	Dani Gibson	England	
23	Adelaide Strikers	Passed		
24	Sydney Sixers	Passed		
Round 4
25	Sydney Sixers	Mady Villiers	England	
26	Adelaide Strikers	Tammy Beaumont	England	
27	Melbourne Stars	Passed		
28	Perth Scorchers	Passed		
29	Hobart Hurricanes	Passed		
30	Sydney Thunder	Passed		
31	Melbourne Renegades	Passed		
32	Brisbane Heat	Nadine de Klerk	South Africa	Pre-signed player

== Squads ==
Unless otherwise specified, all players are Australian.

As of 7 November 2025

Adelaide Strikers Coach: Luke Williams	Brisbane Heat Coach: Mark Sorell	Hobart Hurricanes Coach: Jude Coleman	Melbourne Renegades Coach: Simon Helmot
Jemma Barsby; Tammy Beaumont (ENG); Darcie Brown; Sophie Ecclestone (ENG); Ellie Johnston; Eleanor Larosa; Anesu Mushangwe; Tahlia McGrath (cap); Bridget Patterson; Madeline Penna; Megan Schutt; Tabatha Saville; Amanda-Jade Wellington; Ella Wilson; Laura Wolvaardt (SA)	Lily Bassingthwaighte; Bonnie Berry; Lucy Bourke; Nadine de Klerk (SA); Sianna Ginger; Lucy Hamilton; Nicola Hancock; Grace Harris; Chinelle Henry (WIN); Jess Jonassen (cap); Charli Knott; Grace Parsons; Georgia Redmayne; Jemimah Rodrigues (IND); Mikayla Wrigley	Kathryn Bryce; Nicola Carey; Heather Graham; Isabella Malgioglio; Ruth Johnston; Lizelle Lee; Nat Sciver-Brunt (ENG); Hayley Silver-Holmes; Amy Smith; Lauren Smith; Linsey Smith (ENG); Molly Strano; Rachel Trenaman; Elyse Villani (cap); Callie Wilson; Danni Wyatt-Hodge (ENG)	Charis Bekker; Alice Capsey (ENG); Sarah Coyte; Emma de Broughe; Deandra Dottin (WIN); ~~Hayley Matthews (WIN)~~; Nicole Faltum; Tess Flintoff; Milly Illingworth; Sara Kennedy; Sophie Molineux (cap); Davina Perrin (ENG); Naomi Stalenberg; Georgia Wareham; Courtney Webb; Issy Wong (ENG); ~~Tayla Vlaeminck~~
Melbourne Stars Coach: Andrew Christie	Perth Scorchers Coach: Becky Grundy	Sydney Sixers Coach: Matthew Mott	Sydney Thunder Coach: Lisa Keightley
Sophie Day; Kim Garth; Dani Gibson (ENG); Maisy Gibson; Ella Hayward; Amy Jones (ENG); Marizanne Kapp (SA); Meg Lanning; Rhys McKenna; Ines McKeon (FRA); Sasha Moloney; Indigo Noble; Georgia Prestwidge; Sophie Reid; Annabel Sutherland (cap)	Chloe Ainsworth; Maddy Darke; Sophie Devine (cap) (NZL); Amy Edgar; Mikayla Hinkley; Ebony Hoskin; Freya Kemp (ENG); Alana King; Katie Mack; Shay Manolini; Lilly Mills; Beth Mooney; Chloe Piparo; Paige Scholfield (ENG); ~~Chloe Tryon (SA)~~; Ruby Strange	Caoimhe Bray; Maitlan Brown; Erin Burns; Mathilda Carmichael; Lauren Cheatle; Sophia Dunkley (ENG); Ashleigh Gardner (cap); Alyssa Healy; Elsa Hunter (MAS); Amelia Kerr (NZL); Lauren Kua; Emma Manix-Geeves; Ellyse Perry; Courtney Sippel; Mady Villiers (ENG)	Chamari Athapaththu (SL); Samantha Bates; Ella Briscoe; ~~Hannah Darlington~~; Sienna Eve; Lucy Finn; Hasrat Gill; Laura Harris; Shabnim Ismail (SA); Heather Knight (ENG); Anika Learoyd; Phoebe Litchfield (cap); Taneale Peschel; Georgia Voll; Tahlia Wilson

- Source: Cricket Australia

== Venues ==
Adelaide		Brisbane	Hobart
Adelaide Oval	Karen Rolton Oval	Allan Border Field	Bellerive Oval
Capacity; 53,500	Capacity; 5,000	Capacity; 6,500	Capacity; 19,500
2025–26 Women's Big Bash League season is located in Australia
Melbourne	Perth	Sydney	
CitiPower Centre	WACA Ground	Drummoyne Oval	North Sydney Oval
Capacity; 7,000	Capacity; 10,000	Capacity; 5,500	Capacity; 10,000

== Teams and standings ==
=== Points table ===
Pos	Team	Pld	W	L	NR	Pts	NRR	
1	Hobart Hurricanes (C)	10	7	2	1	15	0.662	Advanced to the play-off phase
2	Sydney Sixers	10	6	3	1	13	−0.313	Advanced to the play-off phase
3	Perth Scorchers (RU)	10	6	4	0	12	−0.132	Advanced to the play-off phase
4	Melbourne Stars	10	5	4	1	11	0.629	Advanced to the play-off phase
5	Melbourne Renegades	10	5	5	0	10	0.121	
6	Adelaide Strikers	10	3	4	3	9	0.077	
7	Sydney Thunder	10	4	5	1	9	−0.126	
8	Brisbane Heat	10	0	9	1	1	−0.869	

Source: ESPNcricinfo

=== League progression ===
Team	Group matches										Playoffs		
Team	1	2	3	4	5	6	7	8	9	10	K	C	F
Adelaide Strikers	1	3	3	3	3	5	6	8	9	9			
Brisbane Heat	0	0	0	0	0	0	1	1	1	1			
Hobart Hurricanes	2	4	6	8	10	10	10	12	14	15			W
Melbourne Renegades	2	4	4	6	6	8	8	8	8	10			
Melbourne Stars	1	3	3	5	7	9	11	11	11	11	L		
Perth Scorchers	0	2	2	4	4	6	8	8	10	12	W	W	L
Sydney Sixers	2	2	4	4	6	7	9	11	11	13		L	
Sydney Thunder	0	0	0	2	4	4	5	5	7	9			

Win	Loss	No result

- Note: The total points at the end of each group match are listed.
- Note: Click on the points (group matches) or W/L (playoffs) to see the match summary.

=== Win–loss table ===
Below is a summary of results for each team's ten regular season matches, plus finals where applicable, in chronological order. A team's opponent for any given match is listed above the margin of victory/defeat.

Team	1	2	3	4	5	6	7	8	9	10	K	C	F	Pos.
Adelaide; Strikers (ADS)	MLS; N/R	MLR; 7 wickets	PRS; 9 runs (DLS)	HBH; 4 wickets	PRS; 1 run	BRH; 6 wickets	SYT; N/R	BRH; 6 wickets	HBH; N/R	SYS; 1 run	X	X	X	6th
Brisbane; Heat (BRH)	MLR; 7 wickets (DLS)	PRS; 23 runs	HBH; 16 runs (DLS)	SYT; 41 runs	MLS; 18 runs	ADS; 6 wickets	SYS; N/R	ADS; 6 wickets	SYT; 23 runs	PRS; 7 wickets	X	X	X	8th
Hobart; Hurricanes (HBH)	SYT; 6 wickets	SYS; 6 wickets	BRH; 16 runs (DLS)	ADS; 4 wickets	MLR; 6 wickets (DLS)	SYS; 11 runs	MLS; 37 runs	PRS; 7 wickets	MLS; 81 runs (DLS)	ADS; N/R	→	→	PRS; 8 wickets	1st
Melbourne; Renegades (MLR)	BRH; 7 wickets (DLS)	SYT; 4 wickets	ADS; 7 wickets	MLS; 4 wickets	HBH; 6 wickets (DLS)	SYT; 8 wickets	PRS; 4 wickets	MLS; 45 runs	PRS; 30 runs	SYS; 6 wickets	X	X	X	5th
Melbourne; Stars (MLS)	ADS; N/R	PRS; 16 runs (DLS)	MLR; 4 wickets	SYS; 111 runs (DLS)	BRH; 18 run	HBH; 37 run	MLR; 45 run	HBH; 81 runs (DLS)	SYS; 16 runs	SYT; 9 wickets (DLS)	PRS; 28 runs	X	X	4th
Perth; Scorchers (PRS)	SYS; 10 wickets	BRH; 23 runs	MLS; 16 runs (DLS)	ADS; 9 runs (DLS)	SYT; 9 wickets	ADS; 1 run	MLR; 4 wickets	HBH; 7 wickets	MLR; 30 runs	BRH; 7 wickets	MLS; 28 runs	SYS; 11 runs	HBH; 8 wickets	2nd
Sydney; Sixers (SYS)	PRS; 10 wickets	HBH; 6 wickets	SYT; 24 runs	MLS; 111 runs (DLS)	HBH; 11 runs	BRH; N/R	SYT; 6 wickets	MLS; 16 runs	MLR; 6 wickets	ADS; 1 run	→	PRS; 11 runs	X	3rd
Sydney; Thunder (SYT)	HBH; 6 wickets	MLR; 4 wickets	SYS; 24 runs	PRS; 9 wickets	BRH; 41 runs	MLR; 8 wickets	ADS; N/R	SYS; 6 wickets	BRH; 23 runs	MLS; 9 wickets (DLS)	X	X	X	7th

Team's results→	Won	Tied	Lost	N/R

== League stage ==
On 11 July 2025, Cricket Australia confirmed the full schedule for the tournament.

Match 1
9 November 2025
12:40
Scorecard

Brisbane Heat; 133 (20 overs)	v	Melbourne Renegades; 3/66 (7.3 overs)
Nadine de Klerk 40 (38); Georgia Wareham 3/12 (4 overs)		Courtney Webb 34* (22); Sianna Ginger 2/16 (2 overs)

Melbourne Renegades won by 7 wickets (DLS method)
Allan Border Field, Brisbane
Umpires: Stephen Dionysius and Nathan James
Player of the match: Georgia Wareham (Melbourne Renegades)

- Melbourne Renegades won the toss and elected to field.
- Melbourne Renegades were set a revised target of 66 runs from 8 overs due to rain.

Match 2
9 November 2025
16:10
Scorecard

Sydney Thunder; 8/181 (20 overs)	v	Hobart Hurricanes; 4/182 (19.3 overs)
Heather Knight 39 (31); Hayley Silver-Holmes 2/27 (3 overs)		Danni Wyatt-Hodge 90 (52); Shabnim Ismail 2/22 (4 overs)

Hobart Hurricanes won by 6 wickets
Allan Border Field, Brisbane
Umpires: Stephen Dionysius and Kylie White
Player of the match: Danni Wyatt-Hodge (Hobart Hurricanes)

- Hobart Hurricanes won the toss and elected to field.

Match 3
9 November 2025
17:30 (D/N)
Scorecard

Perth Scorchers; 109 (19.3 overs)	v	Sydney Sixers; 0/112 (12.5 overs)
Mikayla Hinkley 31 (30); Ashleigh Gardner 5/15 (4 overs)		Sophia Dunkley 61* (40)

Sydney Sixers won by 10 wickets
WACA Ground, Perth
Umpires: Kate Holloman and Ahmad Khan
Player of the match: Ashleigh Gardner (Sydney Sixers)

- Perth Scorchers won the toss and elected to bat.

Match 4
10 November 2025
15:10
Scorecard

Melbourne Stars; 5/184 (20 overs)	v	Adelaide Strikers; 1/32 (4.2 overs)
Meg Lanning 60 (41); Amanda-Jade Wellington 2/20 (4 overs)		Madeline Penna 22* (12); Marizanne Kapp 1/9 (2 overs)

No result
Junction Oval, Melbourne
Umpires: Bede Sajowitz and Malcolm Wood

- Adelaide Strikers won the toss and elected to field.
- No further play was possible due to rain.

Match 5
11 November 2025
15:10
Scorecard

Sydney Thunder; 7/148 (20 overs)	v	Melbourne Renegades; 6/151 (18.1 overs)
Anika Learoyd 31 (21); Georgia Wareham 2/25 (4 overs)		Georgia Wareham 58 (32); Chamari Athapaththu 2/24 (3 overs)

Melbourne Renegades won by 4 wickets
Junction Oval, Melbourne
Umpires: Daryl Brigham and Chris Grant
Player of the match: Georgia Wareham (Melbourne Renegades)

- Melbourne Renegades won the toss and elected to field.

Match 6
12 November 2025
18:10 (N)
Scorecard

Perth Scorchers; 3/172 (20 overs)	v	Brisbane Heat; 149 (19.1 overs)
Beth Mooney 105 (73); Lucy Hamilton 2/28 (4 overs)		Grace Harris 46 (30); Sophie Devine 2/32 (3 overs)

Perth Scorchers won by 23 runs
Allan Border Field, Brisbane
Umpires: Terry Pascoe (Aus) and Riki Wessels (Eng)
Player of the match: Beth Mooney (Perth Scorchers)

- Brisbane Heat won the toss and elected to field.

Match 7
13 November 2025
19:10 (N)
Scorecard

Sydney Sixers; 9/152 (20 overs)	v	Hobart Hurricanes; 4/154 (16.5 overs)
Alyssa Healy 37 (26); Hayley Silver-Holmes 3/18 (3 overs)		Lizelle Lee 55 (33); Caoimhe Bray 2/17 (3 overs)

Hobart Hurricanes won by 6 wickets
North Sydney Oval, Sydney
Umpires: Roberto Howard and Patrick Jackson
Player of the match: Hayley Silver-Holmes (Hobart Hurricanes)

- Hobart Hurricanes won the toss and elected to field.

Match 8
14 November 2025
15:10
Scorecard

Melbourne Stars; 4/173 (20 overs)	v	Perth Scorchers; 8/78 (9 overs)
Meg Lanning 90* (55); Lilly Mills 2/22 (4 overs)		Beth Mooney 14 (7); Sophie Day 3/7 (1 over)

Melbourne Stars won by 16 runs (DLS method)
Karen Rolton Oval, Adelaide
Umpires: Peter George and Rob Stewart
Player of the match: Meg Lanning (Melbourne Stars)

- Perth Scorchers won the toss and elected to field.
- Perth Scorchers were set a revised target of 95 runs from 9 overs due to rain.

Match 9
14 November 2025
18:40 (N)
Scorecard

Melbourne Renegades; 9/141 (20 overs)	v	Adelaide Strikers; 3/143 (17.4 overs)
Courtney Webb 46 (39); Darcie Brown 2/24 (4 overs); Sophie Ecclestone 2/24 (4 overs)		Laura Wolvaardt 71* (48); Tess Flintoff 2/27 (4 overs)

Adelaide Strikers won by 7 wickets
Karen Rolton Oval, Adelaide
Umpires: Peter George and Rob Stewart
Player of the match: Laura Wolvaardt (Adelaide Strikers)

- Adelaide Strikers won the toss and elected to field.

Match 10
15 November 2025
15:40
Scorecard

Hobart Hurricanes; 1/114 (12 overs)	v	Brisbane Heat; 9/108 (12 overs)
Lizelle Lee 59* (45); Jess Jonassen 1/12 (3 overs)		Grace Harris 28 (21); Nicola Carey 2/10 (2 overs)

Hobart Hurricanes won by 16 runs (DLS method)
Drummoyne Oval, Sydney
Umpires: Roberto Howard and Lauren McGill
Player of the match: Lizelle Lee (Hobart Hurricanes)

- Brisbane Heat won the toss and elected to field.
- The match was reduced to 12 overs per side due to rain.
- Brisbane Heat were set a revised target of 125 runs.

Match 11
15 November 2025
19:10 (N)
Scorecard

Sydney Sixers; 9/142 (20 overs)	v	Sydney Thunder; 8/118 (20 overs)
Sophia Dunkley 43 (35); Shabnim Ismail 3/27 (4 overs)		Lucy Finn 49* (34); Caoimhe Bray 4/15 (4 overs)

Sydney Sixers won by 24 runs
Drummoyne Oval, Sydney
Umpires: Roberto Howard and Patrick Jackson
Player of the match: Caoimhe Bray (Sydney Sixers)

- Sydney Thunder won the toss and elected to field.

Match 12
16 November 2025
10:10
Scorecard

Adelaide Strikers; 112 (17.4 overs)	v	Perth Scorchers; 2/55 (9.1 overs)
Ellie Johnston 33 (21); Sophie Devine 3/12 (3 overs)		Katie Mack 24* (30); Tahlia McGrath 1/2 (1 over)

Perth Scorchers won by 9 runs (DLS method)
Junction Oval, Melbourne
Umpires: Daryl Brigham and Clare Haysom
Player of the match: Sophie Devine (Perth Scorchers)

- Perth Scorchers won the toss and elected to field.
- Rain prevented any further play.
- Perth Scorchers were 9 runs ahead of the DLS par score when rain interrupted the match.

Match 13
16 November 2025
13:40
Scorecard

Melbourne Stars; 7/141 (20 overs)	v	Melbourne Renegades; 6/145 (18.5 overs)
Rhys McKenna 32 (32); Deandra Dottin 3/20 (3 overs)		Courtney Webb 37 (36); Kim Garth 2/16 (3 overs)

Melbourne Renegades won by 4 wickets
Junction Oval, Melbourne
Umpires: Daryl Brigham and Clare Haysom
Player of the match: Deandra Dottin (Melbourne Renegades)

- Melbourne Renegades won the toss and elected to field.

Match 14
18 November 2025
19:10 (N)
Scorecard

Adelaide Strikers; 7/134 (20 overs)	v	Hobart Hurricanes; 6/136 (19.4 overs)
Amanda-Jade Wellington 33* (21); Heather Graham 2/23 (4 overs)		Danni Wyatt-Hodge 72* (57); Darcie Brown 4/16 (4 overs)

Hobart Hurricanes won by 4 wickets
Bellerive Oval, Hobart
Umpires: Simon Burns and Scolyer
Player of the match: Danni Wyatt-Hodge (Hobart Hurricanes)

- Hobart Hurricanes won the toss and elected to field.

Match 15
19 November 2025
19:10 (N)
Scorecard

Perth Scorchers; 7/150 (20 overs)	v	Sydney Thunder; 1/154 (18.2 overs)
Katie Mack 79 (57); Samantha Bates 1/18 (4 overs)		Tahlia Wilson 55* (44); Lilly Mills 1/19 (3 overs)

Sydney Thunder won by 9 wickets
Drummoyne Oval, Sydney
Umpires: Mitch Claydon and Claire Polosak
Player of the match: Tahlia Wilson (Sydney Thunder)

- Sydney Thunder won the toss and elected to field.

Match 16
20 November 2025
15:40
Scorecard

Melbourne Renegades; 155 (19.3 overs)	v	Hobart Hurricanes; 4/106 (12 overs)
Georgia Wareham 41 (26); Heather Graham 3/23 (4 overs)		Nicola Carey 39 (29); Georgia Wareham 2/17 (2 overs)

Hobart Hurricanes won by 6 wickets (DLS method)
North Sydney Oval, Sydney
Umpires: Lauren McGill and Claire Polosak
Player of the match: Heather Graham (Hobart Hurricanes)

- Hobart Hurricanes won the toss and elected to field.
- Hobart Hurricanes were set a revised target of 106 runs from 13 overs due to rain.

Match 17
20 November 2025
19:10 (N)
Scorecard

Melbourne Stars; 4/219 (20 overs)	v	Sydney Sixers; 42 (7.4 overs)
Meg Lanning 135 (74); Mady Villiers 1/29 (3 overs)		Ellyse Perry 9 (6); Kim Garth 4/3 (2 overs)

Melbourne Stars won by 111 runs (DLS method)
North Sydney Oval, Sydney
Umpires: Mitch Claydon and Roberto Howard
Player of the match: Meg Lanning (Melbourne Stars)

- Sydney Sixers won the toss and elected to field.
- Sydney Sixers were set a revised target of 154 runs from 10 overs due to rain.

Match 18
21 November 2025
19:10 (N)
Scorecard

Sydney Thunder; 6/200 (20 overs)	v	Brisbane Heat; 159 (19.1 overs)
Tahlia Wilson 79 (51); Nadine de Klerk 2/34 (4 overs)		Nadine de Klerk 43 (27); Emily Arlott 3/35 (4 overs)

Sydney Thunder won by 41 runs
Allan Border Field, Brisbane
Umpires: Nathan James and Terry Pascoe
Player of the match: Tahlia Wilson (Sydney Thunder)

- Brisbane Heat won the toss and elected to field.

Match 19
22 November 2025
10:00
Scorecard

Sydney Sixers; 9/147 (20 overs)	v	Hobart Hurricanes; 136 (18.4 overs)
Sophia Dunkley 50 (46); Heather Graham 4/29 (4 overs)		Elyse Villani 42* (31); Ashleigh Gardner 4/36 (4 overs)

Sydney Sixers won by 11 runs
Bellerive Oval, Hobart
Umpires: Sam Burns and Muhammad Qureshi
Player of the match: Ashleigh Gardner (Sydney Sixers)

- Sydney Sixers won the toss and elected to bat.

Match 20
22 November 2025
17:50 (D/N)
Scorecard

Perth Scorchers; 4/159 (20 overs)	v	Adelaide Strikers; 158 (19.5 overs)
Sophie Devine 49* (45); Darcie Brown 2/25 (4 overs)		Laura Wolvaardt 41 (36); Amy Edgar 4/25 (4 overs)

Perth Scorchers won by 1 run
WACA Ground, Perth
Umpires: Kate Holloman and Peta Merrilees
Player of the match: Amy Edgar (Perth Scorchers)

- Adelaide Strikers won the toss and elected to field.

Match 21
23 November 2025
10:00
Scorecard

Sydney Thunder; 64 (17 overs)	v	Melbourne Renegades; 2/68 (11.1 overs)
Heather Knight 20 (24); Georgia Wareham 3/12 (4 overs)		Sophie Molineux 29* (22); Emily Arlott 1/6 (2 overs)

Melbourne Renegades won by 8 wickets
Drummoyne Oval, Sydney
Umpires: Roberto Howard and Claire Polosak
Player of the match: Alice Capsey (Melbourne Renegades)

- Melbourne Renegades won the toss and elected to field.

Match 22
23 November 2025
19:10 (N)
Scorecard

Melbourne Stars; 8/171 (20 overs)	v	Brisbane Heat; 9/153 (20 overs)
Marizanne Kapp 93* (51); Nadine de Klerk 3/24 (4 overs)		Charli Knott 31 (22); Sophie Day 3/28 (4 overs)

Melbourne Stars won by 18 runs
Allan Border Field, Brisbane
Umpires: Nathan James and Kylie White
Player of the match: Marizanne Kapp (Melbourne Stars)

- Melbourne Stars won the toss and elected to bat.

Match 23
25 November 2025
18:40 (N)
Scorecard

Brisbane Heat; 5/169 (20 overs)	v	Adelaide Strikers; 4/170 (20 overs)
Lauren Winfield-Hill 47 (36); Amanda-Jade Wellington 2/31 (4 overs)		Tammy Beaumont 51 (33); Laura Wolvaardt 51 (33); Lucy Hamilton 2/32 (4 overs)

Adelaide Strikers won by 6 wickets
Karen Rolton Oval, Adelaide
Umpires: Dhaval Bhatt and Kurt Miegel
Player of the match: Laura Wolvaardt (Adelaide Strikers)

- Adelaide Strikers won the toss and elected to field.

Match 24
26 November 2025
15:10
Scorecard

Melbourne Stars; 6/151 (20 overs)	v	Hobart Hurricanes; 114 (16.2 overs)
Amy Jones 59 (40); Nicola Carey 2/29 (4 overs)		Elyse Villani 38 (21); Sophie Day 4/17 (3.2 overs)

Melbourne Stars won by 37 runs
Junction Oval, Melbourne
Umpires: Chris Grant and Malcolm Wood
Player of the match: Amy Jones (Melbourne Stars)

- Hobart Hurricanes won the toss and elected to field.

Match 25
27 November 2025
15:10
Scorecard

Melbourne Renegades; 150 (20 overs)	v	Perth Scorchers; 6/151 (18.4 overs)
Nicole Faltum 41* (28); Sophie Devine 2/16 (2 overs)		Sophie Devine 46 (24); Alice Capsey 4/14 (3 overs)

Perth Scorchers won by 4 wickets
Junction Oval, Melbourne
Umpires: Chris Grant (Aus) and Riki Wessels (Eng)
Player of the match: Sophie Devine (Perth Scorchers)

- Perth Scorchers won the toss and elected to field.

Match 26
28 November 2025
15:10
Scorecard

Brisbane Heat	v	Sydney Sixers

Match abandoned
Adelaide Oval, Adelaide
Umpires: Stephen Dionysius and Eloise Sheridan

- No toss.
- No play was possible due to rain.
- Brisbane Heat were eliminated as a result of this match.

Match 27
28 November 2025
18:40 (N)
Scorecard

Adelaide Strikers; 2/45 (5 overs)	v	Sydney Thunder; 0/43 (2.5 overs)
Laura Wolvaardt 22 (13); Shabnim Ismail 1/6 (1 over)		Phoebe Litchfield 38* (15)

No result
Adelaide Oval, Adelaide
Umpires: Stephen Dionysius and Eloise Sheridan

- Sydney Thunder won the toss and elected to field.
- The match was reduced to 5 overs per side due to rain.
- No further play was possible due to rain.

Match 28
29 November 2025
15:10
Scorecard

Melbourne Stars; 5/160 (20 overs)	v	Melbourne Renegades; 115 (16.3 overs)
Meg Lanning 73* (58); Milly Illingworth 3/19 (4 overs)		Nicole Faltum 23 (19); Maisy Gibson 3/17 (2.3 overs)

Melbourne Stars won by 45 runs
Junction Oval, Melbourne
Umpires: Bede Sajowitz (Aus) and Riki Wessels (Eng)
Player of the match: Meg Lanning (Melbourne Stars)

- Melbourne Renegades won the toss and elected to field.

Match 29
29 November 2025
19:10 (N)
Scorecard

Perth Scorchers; 5/186 (20 overs)	v	Hobart Hurricanes; 3/189 (19.1 overs)
Beth Mooney 75 (55); Molly Strano 3/23 (3 overs)		Nat Sciver-Brunt 81 (48); Lilly Mills 1/24 (4 overs)

Hobart Hurricanes won by 7 wickets
Bellerive Oval, Hobart
Umpires: Claire Polosak and Muhammad Qureshi
Player of the match: Nat Sciver-Brunt (Hobart Hurricanes)

- Hobart Hurricanes won the toss and elected to field.

Match 30
30 November 2025
12:10
Scorecard

Brisbane Heat; 9/149 (20 overs)	v	Adelaide Strikers; 4/151 (19.4 overs)
Charli Knott 27 (25); Tahlia McGrath 3/27 (4 overs)		Tammy Beaumont 64 (40); Grace Harris 2/28 (4 overs)

Adelaide Strikers won by 6 wickets
North Sydney Oval, Sydney
Umpires: Jeff Egan and Sharad Patel
Player of the match: Tahlia McGrath (Adelaide Strikers)

- Adelaide Strikers won the toss and elected to field.

Match 31
30 November 2025
15:40
Scorecard

Sydney Thunder; 6/174 (20 overs)	v	Sydney Sixers; 4/176 (19.1 overs)
Heather Knight 65 (47); Maitlan Brown 2/30 (4 overs)		Ellyse Perry 77* (44); Chamari Athapaththu 2/34 (4 overs)

Sydney Sixers won by 6 wickets
North Sydney Oval, Sydney
Umpires: Roberto Howard and Sharad Patel
Player of the match: Ellyse Perry (Sydney Sixers)

- Sydney Sixers won the toss and elected to field.

Match 32
1 December 2025
19:10 (N)
Scorecard

Hobart Hurricanes; 4/176 (17 overs)	v	Melbourne Stars; 98 (15.5 overs)
Danni Wyatt-Hodge 71 (47); Rhys McKenna 1/27 (2 overs)		Sasha Moloney 31 (24); Molly Strano 5/16 (3 overs)

Hobart Hurricanes won by 81 runs (DLS method)
Bellerive Oval, Hobart
Umpires: Sam Burns and Scolyer
Player of the match: Danni Wyatt-Hodge (Hobart Hurricanes)

- Melbourne Stars won the toss and elected to field.
- The match was reduced to 17 overs per side due to rain.
- Melbourne Stars were set a revised target of 180 runs.

Match 33
2 December 2025
17:10 (D/N)
Scorecard

Perth Scorchers; 5/184 (20 overs)	v	Melbourne Renegades; 9/154 (20 overs)
Sophie Devine 40 (28); Issy Wong 2/34 (4 overs)		Georgia Wareham 43 (32); Sophie Devine 4/25 (4 overs)

Perth Scorchers won by 30 runs
WACA Ground, Perth
Umpires: Ahmad Khan and Peta Merrilees
Player of the match: Sophie Devine (Perth Scorchers)

- Melbourne Renegades won the toss and elected to field.
- Sydney Thunder were eliminated as a result of this match.

Match 34
3 December 2025
15:40
Scorecard

Sydney Sixers; 5/164 (20 overs)	v	Melbourne Stars; 8/148 (20 overs)
Ashleigh Gardner 50 (31); Sophie Day 2/27 (4 overs)		Maia Bouchier 67 (40); Ashleigh Gardner 3/31 (4 overs)

Sydney Sixers won by 16 runs
Drummoyne Oval, Sydney
Umpires: Andrew Crozier and Jeff Egan
Player of the match: Ashleigh Gardner (Sydney Sixers)

- Sydney Sixers won the toss and elected to bat.

Match 35
3 December 2025
19:10 (N)
Scorecard

Sydney Thunder; 7/153 (20 overs)	v	Brisbane Heat; 6/130 (20 overs)
Phoebe Litchfield 61 (43); Sarah Glenn 4/18 (4 overs)		Annie O'Neil 33 (21); Georgia Voll 2/27 (4 overs)

Sydney Thunder won by 23 runs
Drummoyne Oval, Sydney
Umpires: Mitch Claydon and Andrew Crozier
Player of the match: Phoebe Litchfield (Sydney Thunder)

- Brisbane Heat won the toss and elected to field.

Match 36
5 December 2025
10:40
Scorecard

Sydney Sixers; 9/130 (20 overs)	v	Melbourne Renegades; 4/134 (16.2 overs)
Ellyse Perry 65 (47); Georgia Wareham 3/21 (4 overs)		Georgia Wareham 49* (29); Maitlan Brown 2/45 (4 overs)

Melbourne Renegades won by 6 wickets
Junction Oval, Melbourne
Umpires: Louise Broadfoot and Chris Grant
Player of the match: Georgia Wareham (Melbourne Renegades)

- Melbourne Renegades won the toss and elected to field.
- Hobart Hurricanes advanced to the Final as a result of this match.

Match 37
5 December 2025
18:40 (N)
Scorecard

Adelaide Strikers; 4/167 (20 overs)	v	Hobart Hurricanes
Madeline Penna 63* (51); Molly Strano 1/17 (3 overs)

No result
Karen Rolton Oval, Adelaide
Umpires: Andrew Crozier and Kurt Miegel

- Hobart Hurricanes won the toss and elected to field.
- No further play was possible due to a ball being inadvertently rolled into the pitch, causing a large divot and a significant change to the pitch conditions.

Match 38
6 December 2025
10:40
Scorecard

Melbourne Stars; 6/66 (10 overs)	v	Sydney Thunder; 1/79 (7.1 overs)
Rhys McKenna 24 (22); Lucy Finn 2/10 (2 overs)		Phoebe Litchfield 37 (23); Annabel Sutherland 1/20 (2 overs)

Sydney Thunder won by 9 wickets (DLS method)
Junction Oval, Melbourne
Umpires: Louise Broadfoot (Aus) and Riki Wessels (Eng)
Player of the match: Georgia Voll (Sydney Thunder)

- Sydney Thunder won the toss and elected to field.
- The match was reduced to 10 overs per side due to rain.
- Sydney Thunder were set a revised target of 76 runs.

Match 39
6 December 2025
16:10
Scorecard

Brisbane Heat; 7/164 (20 overs)	v	Perth Scorchers; 3/165 (19.2 overs)
Georgia Redmayne 57 (47); Lilly Mills 2/23 (4 overs)		Beth Mooney 94* (61); Sarah Glenn 2/46 (4 overs)

Perth Scorchers won by 7 wickets
WACA Ground, Perth
Umpires: Jarryd Buscall and Ahmad Khan
Player of the match: Beth Mooney (Perth Scorchers)

- Brisbane Heat won the toss and elected to bat.
- Melbourne Renegades were eliminated as a result of this match.

Match 40
7 December 2025
10:40
Scorecard

Sydney Sixers; 4/173 (20 overs)	v	Adelaide Strikers; 7/172 (20 overs)
Ellyse Perry 111 (71); Eleanor Larosa 4/20 (4 overs)		Bridget Patterson 65* (35); Ashleigh Gardner 2/30 (4 overs)

Sydney Sixers won by 1 run
North Sydney Oval, Sydney
Umpires: Sharad Patel and Claire Polosak
Player of the match: Ellyse Perry (Sydney Sixers)

- Adelaide Strikers won the toss and elected to field.
- Sydney Sixers advanced to the Challenger as a result of this match.
- Perth Scorchers and Melbourne Stars advanced to the Knockout as a result of this match.
- Adelaide Strikers were eliminated as a result of this match.

== Knockout stage ==
Knockout
3	Perth Scorchers	5/173 (20 overs)
4	Melbourne Stars	9/145 (20 overs)

Challenger
2	Sydney Sixers	6/172 (20 overs)
KW	Perth Scorchers	8/183 (20 overs)

The Final
1	Hobart Hurricanes	2/141 (15 overs)
CW	Perth Scorchers	5/137 (20 overs)

=== Knockout ===
Knockout
9 December 2025
16:45 (D/N)
Scorecard

Perth Scorchers; 5/173 (20 overs)	v	Melbourne Stars; 9/145 (20 overs)
Katie Mack 52 (39); Rhys McKenna 2/26 (3 overs)		Meg Lanning 49 (45); Lilly Mills 2/19 (2 overs)

Perth Scorchers won by 28 runs
WACA Ground, Perth
Umpires: Roberto Howard and Claire Polosak
Player of the match: Beth Mooney (Perth Scorchers)

- Perth Scorchers won the toss and elected to bat.

=== Challenger ===
Challenger
11 December 2025
19:15 (N)
Scorecard

Perth Scorchers; 8/183 (20 overs)	v	Sydney Sixers; 6/172 (20 overs)
Beth Mooney 76 (44); Ashleigh Gardner 3/25 (4 overs)		Amelia Kerr 42 (29); Alana King 3/17 (4 overs)

Perth Scorchers won by 11 runs
North Sydney Oval, Sydney
Umpires: Andrew Crozier and Sharad Patel
Player of the match: Beth Mooney (Perth Scorchers)

- Sydney Sixers won the toss and elected to field.

=== The Final ===
The Final
13 December 2025
19:15 (N)
Scorecard

Perth Scorchers; 5/137 (20 overs)	v	Hobart Hurricanes; 2/141 (15 overs)
Sophie Devine 34 (29); Linsey Smith 2/8 (2 overs)		Lizelle Lee 77* (44); Amy Edgar 1/13 (2 overs)

Hobart Hurricanes won by 8 wickets
Bellerive Oval, Hobart
Umpires: Andrew Crozier and Claire Polosak
Player of the match: Lizelle Lee (Hobart Hurricanes)

- Perth Scorchers won the toss and elected to bat.

== Statistics ==
=== Highest team totals ===
Score	Team	Against	Venue	Date
219/4 (20 overs)	Melbourne Stars	Sydney Sixers	North Sydney Oval, Sydney	20 November 2025
200/6 (20 overs)	Sydney Thunder	Brisbane Heat	Allan Border Field, Brisbane	21 November 2025
189/3 (19.1 overs)	Hobart Hurricanes	Perth Scorchers	Bellerive Oval, Hobart	29 November 2025
186/5 (20 overs)	Perth Scorchers	Hobart Hurricanes	Bellerive Oval, Hobart	29 November 2025
184/5 (20 overs)	Melbourne Stars	Adelaide Strikers	Junction Oval, Melbourne	10 November 2025
184/5 (20 overs)	Perth Scorchers	Melbourne Stars	WACA Ground, Perth	9 December 2025
Source: ESPNcricinfo; Last updated: 9 December 2025

=== Most individual runs ===
Runs	Player	Team
549	Beth Mooney	Perth Scorchers
479	Meg Lanning	Melbourne Stars
432	Danni Wyatt-Hodge	Hobart Hurricanes
412	Ellyse Perry	Sydney Sixers
354	Sophia Dunkley	Sydney Sixers
Source: ESPNcricinfo; Last updated: 9 December 2025

=== Highest individual score ===
Runs	Player	Team	Opposition
135	Meg Lanning	Melbourne Stars	Sydney Sixers
111	Ellyse Perry	Sydney Sixers	Adelaide Strikers
105	Beth Mooney	Perth Scorchers	Brisbane Heat
94*	Beth Mooney	Perth Scorchers	Brisbane Heat
93*	Marizanne Kapp	Melbourne Stars	Brisbane Heat
Source: ESPNcricinfo; Last updated: 9 December 2025

=== Most wickets ===
Wickets	Player	Team
19	Georgia Wareham	Melbourne Renegades
19	Ashleigh Gardner	Sydney Sixers
16	Sophie Day	Melbourne Stars
16	Heather Graham	Hobart Hurricanes
15	Sophie Devine	Perth Scorchers
15	Linsey Smith	Hobart Hurricanes
Source: ESPNcricinfo; Last updated: 9 December 2025

== Awards ==
=== Player of the tournament ===
Player of the Tournament votes are awarded on a 3–2–1 basis by the two standing umpires at the conclusion of every match.

Pos.	Player	Team	Votes
1	Georgia Wareham	Melbourne Renegades	25
2	Meg Lanning	Melbourne Stars	24
=3	Sophie Devine	Perth Scorchers	22
=3	Danni Wyatt-Hodge	Hobart Hurricanes	22
5	Beth Mooney	Perth Scorchers	20

=== Team of the tournament ===
The team of the tournament was announced on 11 December 2025, as selected by the eight head coaches of the participating teams.

- Danni Wyatt-Hodge (Hobart Hurricanes)
- Meg Lanning (Melbourne Stars)
- Beth Mooney (wk) (Perth Scorchers)
- Ellyse Perry (Sydney Sixers)
- Sophie Devine (Perth Scorchers)
- Ashleigh Gardner (Sydney Sixers)
- Georgia Wareham (c) (Melbourne Renegades)
- Heather Graham (Hobart Hurricanes)
- Kim Garth (Melbourne Stars)
- Shabnim Ismail (Sydney Thunder)
- Sophie Day (Melbourne Stars)
- 12th: Phoebe Litchfield (Sydney Thunder)

=== Other awards ===
Award	Player	Team	Description
Golden bat	Meg Lanning	Melbourne Stars	Most runs in regular season
Golden arm	Georgia Wareham	Melbourne Renegades	Most wickets in regular season
Young gun	Lucy Hamilton	Brisbane Heat	Best performance by player 21 or younger

== See also ==
- 2025–26 Big Bash League season
