= 2023–24 Women's Big Bash League season =

Cricket tournament

2023–24 Women's Big Bash League
- Dates: 19 October 2023 – 2 December 2023
- Administrator: Cricket Australia
- Cricket format: Twenty20
- Tournament format(s): Double round-robin and knockout finals
- Champions: Adelaide Strikers (2nd title)
- Runners-up: Brisbane Heat
- Participants: 8
- Matches: 59
- Player of the series: Chamari Athapaththu (SYT)
- Most runs: Beth Mooney (PRS) – 557
- Most wickets: Sophie Day (MLS) – 27
- Official website: WBBL

The 2023–24 Women's Big Bash League season or WBBL|09 (also known as Weber Women's Big Bash League 2023 for sponsorship reasons) was the ninth season of the Women's Big Bash League (WBBL), the semi-professional women's Twenty20 domestic cricket competition in Australia. The tournament was played from 19 October 2023, with the final held on 2 December 2023. Adelaide Strikers, the defending champions, won the tournament, defeating Brisbane Heat in the final.

== Draft ==
The 2023–24 season saw a players draft being held for the first time for Women's Big Bash League on 3 September 2023.

Table of international draft selections
Round	Pick	Player	Team	National side	Notes
1	1	Marizanne Kapp	Sydney Thunder	South Africa	
1	2	Sophie Devine	Perth Scorchers	New Zealand	Retention pick
1	3	Hayley Matthews	Melbourne Renegades	West Indies	
1	4	Alice Capsey	Melbourne Stars	England	
1	5	Shabnim Ismail	Hobart Hurricanes	South Africa	
1	6	Amelia Kerr	Brisbane Heat	New Zealand	Unavailable for first four matches
1	7	Chloe Tryon	Sydney Sixers	South Africa	
1	8	Passed	Adelaide Strikers	—	
2	9	Heather Knight	Sydney Thunder	England	
2	10	Harmanpreet Kaur	Melbourne Renegades	India	
2	11	Danni Wyatt	Perth Scorchers	England	Withdrew
2	12	Laura Wolvaardt	Adelaide Strikers	South Africa	Retention pick
2	13	Maia Bouchier	Melbourne Stars	England	
2	14	Bryony Smith	Hobart Hurricanes	England	
2	15	Passed	Brisbane Heat	—	
2	16	Passed	Sydney Sixers	—	
3	17	Danielle Gibson	Adelaide Strikers	England	
3	18	Lauren Bell	Sydney Thunder	England	
3	19	Bess Heath	Brisbane Heat	England	
3	20	Passed	Hobart Hurricanes	—	
3	21	Passed	Melbourne Stars	—	
3	22	Passed	Perth Scorchers	—	
3	23	Passed	Melbourne Renegades	—	
3	24	Passed	Sydney Sixers	—	
4	25	Jess Kerr	Sydney Sixers	New Zealand	
4	26	Passed	Melbourne Renegades	—	
4	27	Passed	Perth Scorchers	—	
4	28	Passed	Melbourne Stars	—	
4	29	Passed	Hobart Hurricanes	—	
4	30	Passed	Brisbane Heat	—	
4	31	Passed	Sydney Thunder	—	
4	32	Passed	Adelaide Strikers	—	

== Venues ==
- Adelaide Oval, Adelaide
- Karen Rolton Oval, Adelaide
- Allan Border Field, Brisbane
- Bellerive Oval, Hobart
- University of Tasmania Stadium, Launceston
- Great Barrier Reef Arena, Mackay
- Casey Fields No.4, Melbourne
- CitiPower Centre, Melbourne
- Jubilee Park, Melbourne
- Melbourne Cricket Ground, Melbourne
- WACA Ground, Perth
- Cricket Central, Sydney Olympic Park, Sydney
- North Sydney Oval, Sydney
- Sydney Cricket Ground, Sydney

== Teams ==
Team	Coach	Captain	Australian representatives	Overseas players (Note: Player signed directly by their team, rather than entering the draft.)
Adelaide; Strikers	Luke Williams	Tahlia McGrath	Amanda-Jade Wellington; Megan Schutt; Tahlia McGrath; Darcie Brown	Laura Wolvaardt; Danielle Gibson; Georgia Adams
Brisbane; Heat	Ashley Noffke	Jess Jonassen (Note: Georgia Redmayne stood in as acting captain for one game)	Grace Harris; Jess Jonassen	Amelia Kerr; Bess Heath; Mignon du Preez; Sarah Glenn (Note: Replacement player)
Hobart; Hurricanes	Jude Coleman	Elyse Villani (Note: Heather Graham stood in as acting captain for one game)	Heather Graham; Elyse Villani; Nicola Carey	Shabnim Ismail; Bryony Smith; Lizelle Lee
Melbourne; Renegades	Simon Helmot	Hayley Matthews	Georgia Wareham; Sophie Molineux	Hayley Matthews; Harmanpreet Kaur; Tammy Beaumont
Melbourne; Stars	Jonathan Batty	Meg Lanning (Note: Annabel Sutherland stood in as acting captain for three games)	Meg Lanning; Annabel Sutherland; Kim Garth	Alice Capsey; Maia Bouchier; Sophia Dunkley
Perth; Scorchers	Becky Grundy	Sophie Devine	Beth Mooney; Alana King; Stella Campbell	Sophie Devine; Danni Wyatt (Note: Unavailable for the season); Amy Jones; Lauren Winfield-Hill; Nat Sciver-Brunt
Sydney; Sixers	Charlotte Edwards	Ellyse Perry (Note: Ashleigh Gardner stood in as acting captain for one game)	Alyssa Healy; Ellyse Perry; Ashleigh Gardner; Erin Burns; Maitlan Brown	Chloe Tryon; Jess Kerr; Linsey Smith; Suzie Bates
Sydney; Thunder	Lisa Keightley	Heather Knight (Note: Sammy-Jo Johnson stood in as acting captain for one game)	Hannah Darlington; Phoebe Litchfield	Marizanne Kapp; Heather Knight; Lauren Bell; Chamari Athapaththu

== Squads ==
Teams	Squads
Adelaide Strikers	Georgia Adams; Jemma Barsby; Darcie Brown; Danielle Gibson; Katie Mack; Tahlia McGrath; Anesu Mushangwe; Courtney Neale; Annie O'Neil; Bridget Patterson; Madeline Penna; Megan Schutt; Amanda-Jade Wellington; Ella Wilson; Laura Wolvaardt
Brisbane Heat	Mignon du Preez; Lucy Hamilton; Nicola Hancock; Grace Harris; Laura Harris; Bess Heath; Mikayla Hinkley; Ellie Johnston; Jess Jonassen; Amelia Kerr; Charli Knott; Grace Parsons; Georgia Redmayne; Courtney Sippel; Georgia Voll; Sarah Glenn
Hobart Hurricanes	Nicola Carey; Julia Cavanough; Maisy Gibson; Heather Graham; Shabnim Ismail; Ruth Johnston; Lizelle Lee; Emma Manix-Geeves; Tabatha Saville; Hayley Silver-Holmes; Amy Smith; Bryony Smith; Molly Strano; ~~Rachel Trenaman~~; Elyse Villani; Naomi Stalenberg
Melbourne Renegades	Tammy Beaumont; Sarah Coyte; Emma de Broughe; Josie Dooley; Jess Duffin; Ellie Falconer; Ella Hayward; Harmanpreet Kaur; Erica Kershaw; Hayley Matthews; Sophie Molineux; Rhiann O'Donnell; Georgia Prestwidge; ~~Tayla Vlaeminck~~; Georgia Wareham; Courtney Webb
Melbourne Stars	Sophia Dunkley; Meg Lanning; Alice Capsey; Maia Bouchier; Sophie Day; Nicole Faltum; Tess Flintoff; Kim Garth; Olivia Henry; Milly Illingworth; Rhys McKenna; Sasha Moloney; Jasmine Nevins; Sophie Reid; Annabel Sutherland
Perth Scorchers	Sophie Devine; Lauren Winfield-Hill; Amy Jones; ~~Danni Wyatt~~; Charis Bekker; Piepa Cleary; Amy Edgar; Alana King; Beth Mooney; Taneale Peschel; Chloe Ainsworth; Stella Campbell; Maddy Darke; Lisa Griffith; Lilly Mills; Chloe Piparo; Nat Sciver-Brunt
Sydney Sixers	Chloe Tryon; Jess Kerr; Jade Allen; Suzie Bates; Maitlan Brown; Mathilda Carmichael; Erin Burns; Lauren Cheatle; Ashleigh Gardner; Alyssa Healy; Emma Hughes; Ellyse Perry; Kate Pelle; Kate Peterson; Gabby Sutcliffe
Sydney Thunder	Marizanne Kapp; Heather Knight; Lauren Bell; Samantha Bates; Paris Bowdler; Hannah Darlington; Saskia Horley; Ebony Hoskin; Sammy-Jo Johnson; Anika Learoyd; Phoebe Litchfield; Claire Moore; Olivia Porter; Lauren Smith; Tahlia Wilson; Chamari Athapaththu

== Standings ==
=== Points table ===
Pos	Team	Pld	W	L	NR	Pts	NRR
1	Adelaide Strikers (C)	14	11	3	0	22	1.154
2	Perth Scorchers (CF)	14	8	6	0	16	0.784
3	Brisbane Heat (RU)	14	8	6	0	16	0.203
4	Sydney Thunder (EF)	14	7	6	1	15	0.298
5	Sydney Sixers	14	7	7	0	14	−0.253
6	Hobart Hurricanes	14	6	7	1	13	−0.597
7	Melbourne Stars	14	6	8	0	12	−0.779
8	Melbourne Renegades	14	2	12	0	4	−0.978

Source: ESPNcricinfo
- The top 4 teams advanced to the knockout phase

=== Win–loss table ===
Below is a summary of results for each team's fourteen regular season matches, plus finals where applicable, in chronological order. A team's opponent for any given match is listed above the margin of victory/defeat.

Team	1	2	3	4	5	6	7	8	9	10	11	12	13	14	E	C	F	Pos.
Adelaide; Strikers (ADS)	MLS; 148 runs	MLR; 81 runs	MLS; 4 wickets	HBH; 7 wickets	BRH; 59 runs	SYS; 5 Wickets	PRS; 6 Wickets	MLR; 6 Wickets	BRH; 4 wickets	SYT; 6 Wickets	SYS; 7 wickets	SYT; 3 runs	PRS; 5 wickets	HBH; 77 runs	→	→	BRH; 3 runs	1st (C)
Brisbane; Heat (BRH)	MLR; 6 runs	PRS; 50 runs	SYS; 3 wickets	MLS; 13 runs	ADS; 59 runs	HBH; 6 wickets	SYT; 8 runs	PRS; 39 runs	ADS; 4 wickets	HBH; 53 runs	MLR; 2 runs	MLS; 15 runs	SYS; 6 wickets	SYT; 22 runs	SYT; 44 runs	PRS; 67 runs	ADS; 3 runs	3rd (RU)
Hobart; Hurricanes (HBH)	PRS; 98 runs	PRS; 7 wickets	ADS; 7 wickets	SYT; 24 runs	MLS; 6 wickets	BRH; 6 wickets	SYT; N/R	SYS; 57 runs	3 wickets	BRH; 53 runs	MLS; 8 wickets	MLR; 8 wickets	MLR; 93 runs	ADS; 77 runs	X	X	X	6th
Melbourne; Renegades (MLR)	BRH; 6 runs	ADS; 81 runs	SYT; 8 wickets	SYS; 6 runs	SYT; 37 runs	PRS; 6 wickets	SYS; 7 wickets	ADS; 6 wickets	PRS; 10 wickets	MLS; 4 runs	BRH; 2 runs	HBH; 8 wickets	HBH; 93 runs	MLS; 8 runs (DLS)	X	X	X	8th
Melbourne; Stars (MLS)	SYS; 2 runs	ADS; 148 runs	ADS; 4 wickets	BRH; 13 runs	PRS; 7 runs	HBH; 6 wickets	SYT; 9 wickets	SYS; 4 runs (DLS)	SYT; 4 runs	MLR; 4 runs	HBH; 8 wickets	BRH; 15 runs	PRS; 33 runs	MLR; 8 runs (DLS)	X	X	X	7th
Perth; Scorchers (PRS)	HBH; 98 runs	BRH; 50 runs	HBH; 7 wickets	MLS; 7 runs	SYS; 36 runs	MLR; 6 Wickets	ADS; 6 Wickets	BRH; 39 runs	MLR; 10 wickets	SYT; 42 runs	SYS; 61 runs	SYT; 9 wickets	MLS; 33 runs	ADS; 5 wickets	→	BRH; 67 runs	X	2nd (CF)
Sydney; Sixers (SYS)	MLS; 2 runs	SYT; 42 runs	BRH; 3 wickets	MLR; 6 runs	PRH; 36 runs	ADS; 5 wickets	MLR; 7 wickets	MLS; 4 runs (DLS)	HBH; 57 runs	HBH; 3 wickets	PRS; 61 runs	ADS; 7 wickets	BRH; 6 wickets	SYT; 9 wickets	X	X	X	5th
Sydney; Thunder (SYT)	SYS; 42 runs	MLR; 8 wickets	24 runs	MLR; 37 runs	MLS; 9 wickets	BRH; 8 runs	HBH; N/R	MLS; 4 runs	PRS; 42 runs	ADS; 6 wickets	PRS; 9 wickets	ADS; 3 runs	BRH; 22 runs	SYS; 9 wickets	BRH; 44 runs	X	X	4th (EF)

Team's results→	Won	Tied	Lost	N/R

== Fixtures ==
On 13 July 2023, Cricket Australia confirmed the full schedule for the tournament.

Match 1
19 October 2023
19:40 UTC+11 (N)
Scorecard

Melbourne Stars; 8/165 (20 overs)	v	Sydney Sixers; 9/163 (20 overs)
Meg Lanning 55 (34); Ashleigh Gardner 2/23 (4 overs)		Ashleigh Gardner 72 (44); Annabel Sutherland 4/27 (4 overs)

Melbourne Stars won by 2 runs
North Sydney Oval, Sydney
Umpires: Claire Polosak and Roberto Howard
Player of the match: Annabel Sutherland (Melbourne Stars)

- Sydney Sixers won the toss and elected to field.

Match 2
20 October 2023
15:00 UTC+11
Scorecard

Brisbane Heat; 9/187 (20 overs)	v	Melbourne Renegades; 8/181 (20 overs)
Grace Harris 49 (26); Hayley Matthews 3/30 (4 overs)		Georgia Wareham 36 (16); Sarah Glenn 4/23 (4 overs)

Brisbane Heat won by 6 runs
CitiPower Centre, Melbourne
Umpires: Chris Grant and Mattis van Eck
Player of the match: Charli Knott (Brisbane Heat)

- Melbourne Renegades won the toss and elected to field.

Match 3
20 October 2023
19:10 UTC+11 (N)
Scorecard

Perth Scorchers; 4/186 (20 overs)	v	Hobart Hurricanes; 88 (15.5 overs)
Sophie Devine 87* (44); Molly Strano 1/24 (3 overs)		Molly Strano 37 (30); Alana King 3/19 (4 overs)

Perth Scorchers won by 98 runs
University of Tasmania Stadium, Launceston
Umpires: Craig Seabourne and Sam Burns
Player of the match: Sophie Devine (Perth Scorchers)

- Hobart Hurricanes won the toss and elected to field.

Match 4
21 October 2023
18:40 UTC+10:30 (N)
Scorecard

Adelaide Strikers; 3/177 (20 overs)	v	Melbourne Stars; 29 (9.3 overs)
Katie Mack 86 (50); Sophie Day 3/24 (4 overs)		Sophia Dunkley 9 (10); Megan Schutt 3/3 (3 overs)

Adelaide Strikers won by 148 runs
Karen Rolton Oval, Adelaide
Umpires: Harsimran Singh and Kurt Miegel
Player of the match: Katie Mack (Adelaide Strikers)

- Melbourne Stars won the toss and elected to field.
- Melbourne Stars set a new record for lowest all out WBBL team score.
- Adelaide Strikers set a new record for biggest WBBL winning margin (by runs).

Match 5
22 October 2023
13:40 UTC+11
Scorecard

Brisbane Heat; 7/229 (20 overs)	v	Perth Scorchers; 8/179 (20 overs)
Grace Harris 136* (59); Amy Edgar 3/31 (3 overs)		Beth Mooney 60 (30); Courtney Sippel 4/27 (4 overs)

Brisbane Heat won by 50 runs
North Sydney Oval, Sydney
Umpires: Andrew Hamilton and Claire Polosak
Player of the match: Grace Harris (Brisbane Heat)

- Perth Scorchers won the toss and elected to field.

Match 6
22 October 2023
17:25 UTC+11 (D/N)
Scorecard

Sydney Thunder; 5/190 (20 overs)	v	Sydney Sixers; 9/148 (20 overs)
Phoebe Litchfield 54* (28); Jess Kerr 2/25 (4 overs)		Ellyse Perry 31 (16); Chamari Athapaththu 3/20 (4 overs)

Sydney Thunder won by 42 runs
North Sydney Oval, Sydney
Umpires: Claire Polosak and Roberto Howard
Player of the match: Chamari Athapaththu (Sydney Thunder)

- Sydney Sixers won the toss and elected to field.

Match 7
23 October 2023
15:00 UTC+11
Scorecard

Melbourne Renegades; 3/167 (20 overs)	v	Adelaide Strikers; 86 (14.5 overs)
Courtney Webb 49* (34); Georgia Adams 1/7 (1 over)		Tahlia McGrath 31 (25); Harmanpreet Kaur 2/11 (1.5 overs)

Melbourne Renegades won by 81 runs
CitiPower Centre, Melbourne
Umpires: Chris Grant and Daryl Brigham
Player of the match: Harmanpreet Kaur (Melbourne Renegades)

- Adelaide Strikers won the toss and elected to field.

Match 8
24 October 2023
14:30 UTC+11
Scorecard

Melbourne Stars; 6/133 (20 overs)	v	Adelaide Strikers; 6/134 (19.4 overs)
Maia Bouchier 48 (38); Megan Schutt 2/27 (4 overs)		Katie Mack 48 (40); Alice Capsey 2/19 (4 overs)

Adelaide Strikers won by 4 wickets
CitiPower Centre, Melbourne
Umpires: Gaurav Bawa and Lisa McCabe
Player of the match: Katie Mack (Adelaide Strikers)

- Melbourne Stars won the toss and elected to bat.

Match 9
24 October 2023
18:10 UTC+11 (D/N)
Scorecard

Sydney Sixers; 8/146 (20 overs)	v	Brisbane Heat; 7/147 (19 overs)
Ellyse Perry 49 (30); Nicola Hancock 2/23 (4 overs); Courtney Sippel 2/23 (4 overs)		Grace Harris 39 (19); Ashleigh Gardner 2/17 (3 overs)

Brisbane Heat won by 3 wickets
North Sydney Oval, Sydney
Umpires: Andrew Hamilton and Mitchell Claydon
Player of the match: Georgia Voll (Brisbane Heat)

- Brisbane Heat won the toss and elected to field.

Match 10
25 October 2023
16:10 UTC+8 (D/N)
Scorecard

Hobart Hurricanes; 158 (20 overs)	v	Perth Scorchers; 3/161 (18.3 overs)
Naomi Stalenberg 54 (29); Chloe Ainsworth 3/25 (3 overs)		Beth Mooney 52 (33); Heather Graham 1/31 (4 overs)

Perth Scorchers won by 7 wickets
WACA Ground, Perth
Umpires: Jarryd Buscall and Ashlee Gibbons
Player of the match: Chloe Ainsworth (Perth Scorchers)

- Hobart Hurricanes won the toss and elected to bat.

Match 11
26 October 2023
15:00 UTC+11
Scorecard

Melbourne Renegades; 5/147 (20 overs)	v	Sydney Thunder; 2/151 (17.3 overs)
Georgia Wareham 47* (34); Ebony Hoskin 1/18 (2 overs)		Chamari Athapaththu 80 (54); Georgia Wareham 2/23 (4 overs)

Sydney Thunder won by 8 wickets
Cricket Central, Sydney Olympic Park, Sydney
Umpires: Mitchell Claydon and Daniel Moran
Player of the match: Chamari Athapaththu (Sydney Thunder)

- Sydney Thunder won the toss and elected to field.

Match 12
27 October 2023
15:40 UTC+10
Scorecard

Adelaide Strikers; 1/74 (8 overs)	v	Hobart Hurricanes; 3/76 (7 overs)
Laura Wolvaardt 35* (20)		Elyse Villani 39* (24); Georgia Adams 1/13 (1 over); Danielle Gibson 1/13 (1 over)

Hobart Hurricanes won by 7 wickets
Allan Border Field, Brisbane
Umpires: Joshua Adie and Stephen Dionysius
Player of the match: Elyse Villani (Hobart Hurricanes)

- Hobart Hurricanes won the toss and elected to field.
- Match reduced to 8 overs per side due to rain.

Match 13
27 October 2023
19:30 UTC+10 (N)
Scorecard

Brisbane Heat; 6/150 (20 overs)	v	Melbourne Stars; 7/137 (20 overs)
Georgia Voll 48* (40); Annabel Sutherland 2/19 (4 overs)		Alice Capsey 52 (43); Charli Knott 2/13 (3 overs)

Brisbane Heat won by 13 runs
Allan Border Field, Brisbane
Umpires: Stephen Dionysius and Nathan James
Player of the match: Charli Knott (Brisbane Heat)

- Melbourne Stars won toss and elected to field.

Match 14
28 October 2023
12:00 UTC+11
Scorecard

Sydney Sixers; 7/164 (20 overs)	v	Melbourne Renegades; 9/158 (20 overs)
Ellyse Perry 50 (41); Hayley Matthews 3/17 (4 overs)		Tammy Beaumont 43 (24); Lauren Cheatle 2/23 (4 overs)

Sydney Sixers won by 6 runs
CitiPower Centre, Melbourne
Umpires: Daryl Brigham and Chris Grant
Player of the match: Ashleigh Gardner (Sydney Sixers)

- Sydney Sixers won the toss and elected to bat.

Match 15
29 October 2023
15:00 UTC+11
Scorecard

Melbourne Stars; 7/154 (20 overs)	v	Perth Scorchers; 9/147 (20 overs)
Annabel Sutherland 49 (27); Sophie Devine 2/21 (3 overs)		Maddy Darke 45 (33); Sophie Day 4/27 (4 overs)

Melbourne Stars won by 7 runs
CitiPower Centre, Melbourne
Umpires: Chris Grant and Clare Haysom
Player of the match: Annabel Sutherland (Melbourne Stars)

- Melbourne Stars won the toss and elected to bat.

Match 16
29 October 2023
18:40 UTC+10:30 (N)
Scorecard

Adelaide Strikers; 4/148 (20 overs)	v	Brisbane Heat; 89 (16 overs)
Bridget Patterson 70 (53); Jess Jonassen 2/22 (4 overs)		Jess Jonassen 22 (18); Amanda-Jade Wellington 3/14 (4 overs)

Adelaide Strikers won by 59 runs
Karen Rolton Oval, Adelaide
Umpires: Andrew Crozier and James Cushway
Player of the match: Bridget Patterson (Adelaide Strikers)

- Adelaide Strikers won the toss and elected to bat.

Match 17
30 October 2023
18:10 UTC+11 (N)
Scorecard

Hobart Hurricanes; 3/174 (20 overs)	v	Sydney Thunder; 6/150 (20 overs)
Lizelle Lee 91 (54); Ebony Hoskin 1/14 (2 overs)		Phoebe Litchfield 68 (42); Molly Strano 2/14 (3 overs)

Hobart Hurricanes won by 24 runs
University of Tasmania Stadium, Launceston
Umpires: Simon Burns and Craig Seabourne
Player of the match: Lizelle Lee (Hobart Hurricanes)

- Hobart Hurricanes won the toss and elected to bat.

Match 18
31 October 2023
17:10 UTC+8 (D/N)
Scorecard

Perth Scorchers; 8/166 (20 overs)	v	Sydney Sixers; 9/130 (20 overs)
Alana King 33* (14); Ashleigh Gardner 3/38 (4 overs)		Ellyse Perry 59 (48); Amy Edgar 4/19 (4 overs)

Perth Scorchers won by 36 runs
WACA Ground, Perth
Umpires: Ahmad Khan and Jamie Thomas
Player of the match: Alana King (Perth Scorchers)

- Perth Scorchers won the toss and elected to bat.

Match 19
1 November 2023
15:00 UTC+11
Scorecard

Sydney Thunder; 5/190 (20 overs)	v	Melbourne Renegades; 7/153 (20 overs)
Heather Knight 52* (31); Harmanpreet Kaur 2/25 (3 overs)		Tammy Beaumont 37 (29); Hannah Darlington 4/33 (4 overs)

Sydney Thunder won by 37 runs
CitiPower Centre, Melbourne
Umpires: Gaurav Bawa and Daryl Brigham
Player of the match: Hannah Darlington (Sydney Thunder)

- Sydney Thunder won the toss and elected to bat.

Match 20
2 November 2023
19:10 UTC+11 (N)
Scorecard

Melbourne Stars; 8/142 (20 overs)	v	Hobart Hurricanes; 4/143 (19.2 overs)
Meg Lanning 75 (50); Shabnim Ismail 3/34 (4 overs)		Nicola Carey 41* (30); Annabel Sutherland 2/32 (4 overs)

Hobart Hurricanes won by 6 wickets
Bellerive Oval, Hobart
Umpires: Craig Seabourne and Sam Burns
Player of the match: Nicola Carey (Hobart Hurricanes)

- Melbourne Stars won the toss and elected to bat.

Match 21
3 November 2023
14:10 UTC+8
Scorecard

Sydney Sixers; 6/111 (20 overs)	v	Adelaide Strikers; 5/114 (17.1 overs)
Maitlan Brown 32* (28); Anesu Mushangwe 2/18 (4 overs)		Katie Mack 50 (45); Lauren Cheatle 2/22 (4 overs)

Adelaide Strikers won by 5 wickets
WACA Ground, Perth
Umpires: Jarryd Buscall and Sharad Patel
Player of the match: Anesu Mushangwe (Adelaide Strikers)

- Adelaide Strikers won the toss and elected to field.

Match 22
3 November 2023
17:40 UTC+8 (D/N)
Scorecard

Melbourne Renegades; 6/171 (20 overs)	v	Perth Scorchers; 4/172 (17.2 overs)
Harmanpreet Kaur 52* (49); Alana King 1/20 (4 overs)		Beth Mooney 59* (44); Sarah Coyte 2/34 (4 overs)

Perth Scorchers won by 6 wickets
WACA Ground, Perth
Umpires: Sharad Patel and Jamie Thomas
Player of the match: Sophie Devine (Perth Scorchers)

- Melbourne Renegades won the toss and elected to bat.

Match 23
4 November 2023
15:00 UTC+11
Scorecard

Melbourne Stars; 5/123 (20 overs)	v	Sydney Thunder; 1/128 (12.5 overs)
Annabel Sutherland 42* (39); Hannah Darlington 2/13 (4 overs)		Chamari Athapaththu 69 (40); Sophia Dunkley 1/8 (1 over)

Sydney Thunder won by 9 wickets
Casey Fields No.4, Melbourne
Umpires: Gaurav Bawa and Daryl Brigham
Player of the match: Chamari Athapaththu (Sydney Thunder)

- Melbourne Stars won the toss and elected to bat.

Match 24
4 November 2023
18:30 UTC+11 (N)
Scorecard

Hobart Hurricanes; 8/120 (20 overs)	v	Brisbane Heat; 4/124 (17.2 overs)
Elyse Villani 58* (54); Charli Knott 2/15 (3 overs)		Amelia Kerr 59 (43); Hayley Silver-Holmes 1/14 (2.2 overs)

Brisbane Heat won by 6 wickets
BBellerive Oval, Hobart
Umpires: Michael Graham-Smith and Muhammad Qureshi
Player of the match: Amelia Kerr (Brisbane Heat)

- Brisbane Heat won the toss and elected to field.

Match 25
5 November 2023
10:40 UTC+8
Scorecard

Melbourne Renegades; 104 (19.5 overs)	v	Sydney Sixers; 3/107 (15.3 overs)
Harmanpreet Kaur 47 (40); Ellyse Perry 5/22 (3.5 overs)		Ellyse Perry 44* (39); Sara Kennedy 2/20 (4 overs)

Sydney Sixers won by 7 wickets
WACA Ground, Perth
Umpires: Andrew Crozier and Kate Hollman
Player of the match: Ellyse Perry (Sydney Sixers)

- Sydney Sixers won the toss and elected to field.

Match 26
5 November 2023
14:25 UTC+8
Scorecard

Perth Scorchers; 7/165 (20 overs)	v	Adelaide Strikers; 4/169 (20 overs)
Nat Sciver-Brunt 53 (33); Amanda-Jade Wellington 3/25 (4 overs)		Katie Mack 71 (52); Amy Edgar 1/31 (4 overs)

Adelaide Strikers won by 6 wickets
WACA Ground, Perth
Umpires: Jarryd Buscall and Sharad Patel
Player of the match: Katie Mack (Adelaide Strikers)

- Perth Scorchers won the toss and elected to bat.

Match 27
6 November 2023
18:10 UTC+11 (N)
Scorecard

Sydney Thunder; 4/204 (20 overs)	v	Brisbane Heat; 5/196 (20 overs)
Tahlia Wilson 83* (54); Courtney Sippel 2/31 (4 overs)		Mignon du Preez 61 (37); Hannah Darlington 2/53 (4 overs)

Sydney Thunder won by 8 runs
North Sydney Oval, Sydney
Umpires: Roberto Howard and Daniel Moran
Player of the match: Tahlia Wilson (Sydney Thunder)

- Brisbane Heat won the toss and elected to field.

Match 28
8 November 2023
15:00 UTC+11
Scorecard

Sydney Sixers; 7/134 (20 overs)	v	Melbourne Stars; 6/51 (7 overs)
Suzie Bates 27 (19); Sophie Day 5/25 (4 overs)		Alice Capsey 21 (14); Chloe Tryon 3/2 (1 over)

Sydney Sixers won by 4 runs (DLS method)
Jubilee Park, Melbourne
Umpires: Daryl Brigham and Lisa McCabe
Player of the match: Sophie Day (Melbourne Stars)

- Melbourne Stars won the toss and elected to field.
- Melbourne Stars were set a revised target of 56 runs from 7 overs due to rain.

Match 29
8 November 2023
18:40 UTC+10:30 (N)
Scorecard

Melbourne Renegades; 5/148 (20 overs)	v	Adelaide Strikers; 4/149 (19 overs)
Jess Duffin 54 (38); Georgia Adams 1/9 (1 over)		Bridget Patterson 36* (26); Georgia Prestwidge 2/19 (4 overs)

Adelaide Strikers won by 6 wickets
Karen Rolton Oval, Adelaide
Umpires: Dhaval Bhatt and Peter George
Player of the match: Bridget Patterson (Adelaide Strikers)

- Melbourne Renegades won the toss and elected to bat.

Match 30
9 November 2023
15:00 UTC+11
Scorecard

Sydney Thunder	v	Hobart Hurricanes

No result (abandoned with a toss)
Cricket Central, Sydney Olympic Park, Sydney
Umpires: Daniel Moran and Bede Sajowitz

- Hobart Hurricanes won the toss and elected to field.
- No play was possible due to rain.

Match 31
9 November 2023
18:10 UTC+10
Scorecard

Perth Scorchers; 3/192 (20 overs)	v	Brisbane Heat; 153 (17.3 overs)
Sophie Devine 106 (62); Nicola Hancock 1/26 (4 overs)		Georgia Redmayne 53 (44); Piepa Cleary 3/27 (4 overs)

Perth Scorchers won by 39 runs
Allan Border Field, Brisbane
Umpires: Stephen Dionysius and Riki Wessels
Player of the match: Sophie Devine (Perth Scorchers)

- Brisbane Heat won the toss and elected to field.

Match 32
10 November 2023
15:20 UTC+11
Scorecard

Sydney Thunder; 125 (20 overs)	v	Melbourne Stars; 9/121 (20 overs)
Heather Knight 45 (35); Sophie Day 4/35 (4 overs)		Alice Capsey 27 (19); Hannah Darlington 5/10 (4 overs)

Sydney Thunder won by 4 runs
North Sydney Oval, Sydney
Umpires: Andrew Hamilton and Troy Penman
Player of the match: Hannah Darlington (Sydney Thunder)

- Sydney Thunder won the toss and elected to bat.

Match 33
10 November 2023
19:10 UTC+11 (N)
Scorecard

Sydney Sixers; 8/166 (20 overs)	v	Hobart Hurricanes; 109 (16.4 overs)
Chloe Tryon 40 (28); Heather Graham 3/36 (4 overs)		Naomi Stalenberg 36 (22); Linsey Smith 2/8 (3 overs)

Sydney Sixers won by 57 runs
North Sydney Oval, Sydney
Umpires: Roberto Howard and Troy Penman
Player of the match: Chloe Tryon (Sydney Sixers)

- Hobart Hurricanes won the toss and elected to field.

Match 34
11 November 2023
14:00 UTC+11
Scorecard

Melbourne Renegades; 5/133 (20 overs)	v	Perth Scorchers; 0/134 (11.2 overs)
Georgia Wareham 57* (46); Amy Edgar 2/14 (4 overs)		Sophie Devine 70* (36)

Perth Scorchers won by 10 wickets
CitiPower Centre, Melbourne
Umpires: Clare Haysom and Lisa McCabe
Player of the match: Sophie Devine (Perth Scorchers)

- Perth Scorchers won the toss and elected to field.

Match 35
11 November 2023
18:10 UTC+10 (N)
Scorecard

Adelaide Strikers; 4/137 (20 overs)	v	Brisbane Heat; 6/139 (19.5 overs)
Madeline Penna 57* (46); Charli Knott 2/15 (3 overs)		Mignon du Preez 60 (49); Megan Schutt 2/29 (4 overs)

Brisbane Heat won by 4 wickets
Great Barrier Reef Arena, Mackay
Umpires: Nathan James and T. Jones
Player of the match: Mignon du Preez (Brisbane Heat)

- Adelaide Strikers won the toss and elected to bat.

Match 36
12 November 2023
10:10 UTC+11
Scorecard

Perth Scorchers; 4/159 (20 overs)	v	Sydney Thunder; 8/117 (20 overs)
Beth Mooney 101* (61); Hannah Darlington 2/26 (4 overs)		Phoebe Litchfield 45 (38); Amy Edgar 3/18 (4 overs)

Perth Scorchers won by 42 runs
CitiPower Centre, Melbourne
Umpires: Clare Haysom and Lisa McCabe
Player of the match: Beth Mooney (Perth Scorchers)

- Sydney Thunder won the toss and elected to field.

Match 37
12 November 2023
13:40 UTC+11
Scorecard

Melbourne Stars; 5/144 (20 overs)	v	Melbourne Renegades; 6/140 (20 overs)
Meg Lanning 67* (49); Sarah Coyte 2/32 (4 overs)		Harmanpreet Kaur 37 (39); Annabel Sutherland 4/22 (4 overs)

Melbourne Stars won by 4 runs
CitiPower Centre, Melbourne
Umpires: Andrew Crozier and Eloise Sheridan
Player of the match: Annabel Sutherland (Melbourne Stars)

- Melbourne Renegades won the toss and elected to field.

Match 38
13 November 2023
18:10 UTC+11 (N)
Scorecard

Hobart Hurricanes; 8/139 (20 overs)	v	Sydney Sixers; 7/140 (20 overs)
Lizelle Lee 50 (34); Maitlan Brown 2/20 (3 overs)		Mathilda Carmichael 32* (21); Heather Graham 3/18 (4 overs)

Sydney Sixers won by 3 wickets
Bellerive Oval, Hobart
Umpires: Muhammad Qureshi and Simon Burns
Player of the match: Mathilda Carmichael (Sydney Sixers)

- Sydney Sixers won the toss and elected to field.

Match 39
15 November 2023
11:00 UTC+10
Scorecard

Brisbane Heat; 5/184 (20 overs)	v	Hobart Hurricanes; 131 (17.3 overs)
Georgia Redmayne 70 (53); Shabnim Ismail 2/22 (4 overs)		Bryony Smith 28 (19); Jess Jonassen 4/20 (3.3 overs)

Brisbane Heat won by 53 runs
Allan Border Field, Brisbane
Umpires: Benjamin Farrell and Michael Mellifont
Player of the match: Georgia Redmayne (Brisbane Heat)

- Hobart Hurricanes won the toss and elected to field.

Match 40
15 November 2023
15:00 UTC+10:30
Scorecard

Sydney Thunder; 6/118 (20 overs)	v	Adelaide Strikers; 4/119 (17.5 overs)
Chamari Athapaththu 43 (40); Megan Schutt 2/25 (4 overs)		Laura Wolvaardt 47 (45); Lauren Smith 3/16 (4 overs)

Adelaide Strikers won by 6 wickets
Karen Rolton Oval, Adelaide
Umpires: Harry Singh and Dhaval Bhatt
Player of the match: Laura Wolvaardt (Adelaide Strikers)

- Adelaide Strikers won the toss and elected to field.

Match 41
16 November 2023
15:30 UTC+11
Scorecard

Perth Scorchers; 6/189 (20 overs)	v	Sydney Sixers; 128 (19.3 overs)
Beth Mooney 91* (57); Ellyse Perry 2/26 (4 overs)		Ellyse Perry 40 (29); Chloe Ainsworth 2/12 (4 overs)

Perth Scorchers won by 61 runs
North Sydney Oval, Sydney
Umpires: Mitch Claydon and Bede Sajowitz
Player of the match: Beth Mooney (Perth Scorchers)

- Sydney Sixers won the toss and elected to field.

Match 42
17 November 2023
15:10 UTC+10
Scorecard

Melbourne Stars; 121 (19.1 overs)	v	Hobart Hurricanes; 2/122 (16.1 overs)
Meg Lanning 27 (19); Molly Strano 3/20 (4 overs)		Lizelle Lee 77* (49); Kim Garth 1/18 (4 overs)

Hobart Hurricanes won by 8 wickets
Allan Border Field, Brisbane
Umpires: David Taylor and Nathan James
Player of the match: Lizelle Lee (Hobart Hurricanes)

- Hobart Hurricanes won the toss and elected to field.

Match 43
17 November 2023
18:40 UTC+10 (N)
Scorecard

Melbourne Renegades; 7/169 (20 overs)	v	Brisbane Heat; 9/167 (20 overs)
Hayley Matthews 46 (28); Nicola Hancock 4/20 (4 overs)		Grace Harris 65 (36); Sarah Coyte 3/26 (4 overs)

Melbourne Renegades won by 2 runs
Allan Border Field, Brisbane
Umpires: David Taylor and Joshua Adie
Player of the match: Hayley Matthews (Melbourne Renegades)

- Brisbane Heat won the toss and elected to field.

Match 44
18 November 2023
15:00 UTC+11
Scorecard

Perth Scorchers; 8/116 (20 overs)	v	Sydney Thunder; 1/120 (16.1 overs)
Amy Jones 37 (16); Lauren Smith 2/12 (4 overs)		Chamari Athapaththu 77* (53)

Sydney Thunder won by 9 wickets
Cricket Central, Sydney Olympic Park, Sydney
Umpires: Andrew Hamilton and Bede Sajowitz
Player of the match: Chamari Athapaththu (Sydney Thunder)

- Sydney Thunder won the toss and elected to field.

Match 45
18 November 2023
19:10 UTC+11 (N)
Scorecard

Sydney Sixers; 8/122 (20 overs)	v	Adelaide Strikers; 3/124 (17.3 overs)
Chloe Tryon 39 (28); Danielle Gibson 3/34 (4 overs)		Katie Mack 45 (37); Kate Peterson 1/3 (1 over)

Adelaide Strikers won by 7 wickets
North Sydney Oval, Sydney
Umpires: Daniel Moran and Roberto Howard
Player of the match: Tahlia McGrath (Adelaide Strikers)

- Adelaide Strikers won the toss and elected to field.

Match 46
19 November 2023
10:10 UTC+11
Scorecard

Melbourne Renegades; 9/101 (20 overs)	v	Hobart Hurricanes; 2/102 (17.4 overs)
Hayley Matthews 39 (39); Heather Graham 3/12 (4 overs)		Elyse Villani 46* (46); Hayley Matthews 1/17 (4 overs)

Hobart Hurricanes won by 8 wickets
CitiPower Centre, Melbourne
Umpires: Daryl Brigham and Andrew Crozier
Player of the match: Heather Graham (Hobart Hurricanes)

- Hobart Hurricanes won the toss and elected to field.

Match 47
19 November 2023
13:40 UTC+11
Scorecard

Melbourne Stars; 5/156 (20 overs)	v	Brisbane Heat; 7/141 (20 overs)
Annabel Sutherland 37 (21); Amelia Kerr 2/21 (4 overs)		Amelia Kerr 36 (34); Sophie Day 3/16 (4 overs)

Melbourne Stars won by 15 runs
CitiPower Centre, Melbourne
Umpires: Stephen Dionysius and Mattis van Eck
Player of the match: Sophie Day (Melbourne Stars)

- Melbourne Stars won the toss and elected to bat.

Match 48
21 November 2023
15:00 UTC+11
Scorecard

Adelaide Strikers; 7/121 (20 overs)	v	Sydney Thunder; 7/118 (20 overs)
Laura Wolvaardt 70* (61); Marizanne Kapp 2/23 (4 overs)		Tahlia Wilson 33 (23); Megan Schutt 2/23 (4 overs)

Adelaide Strikers won by 3 runs
Cricket Central, Sydney Olympic Park, Sydney
Umpires: Mitch Claydon and Bede Sajowitz
Player of the match: Laura Wolvaardt (Adelaide Strikers)

- Sydney Thunder won the toss and elected to field.

Match 49
21 November 2023
18:10 UTC+10 (N)
Scorecard

Brisbane Heat; 7/176 (20 overs)	v	Sydney Sixers; 4/177 (19.5 overs)
Amelia Kerr 64 (44); Ellyse Perry 3/40 (4 overs)		Ashleigh Gardner 36 (30); Jess Jonassen 2/26 (3.5 overs)

Sydney Sixers won by 6 wickets
Allan Border Field, Brisbane
Umpires: Joshua Adie and Nathan James
Player of the match: Ellyse Perry (Sydney Sixers)

- Sydney Sixers won the toss and elected to field.

Match 50
22 November 2023
17:10 UTC+8 (D/N)
Scorecard

Melbourne Stars; 6/157 (20 overs)	v	Perth Scorchers; 9/124 (20 overs)
Sophia Dunkley 73 (48); Piepa Cleary 2/30 (3 overs)		Amy Jones 42 (30); Sophie Day 4/26 (4 overs)

Melbourne Stars won by 33 runs
WACA Ground, Perth
Umpires: Ahmad Khan and Jamie Thomas
Player of the match: Sophie Day (Melbourne Stars)

- Melbourne Stars won the toss and elected to bat.

Match 51
23 November 2023
19:10 UTC+11 (N)
Scorecard

Hobart Hurricanes; 3/212 (20 overs)	v	Melbourne Renegades; 119 (16.2 overs)
Lizelle Lee 101*(53); Georgia Wareham 2/30 (4 overs)		Emma de Broughe 40* (19); Maisy Gibson 4/25 (3.2 overs)

Hobart Hurricanes won by 93 runs
Bellerive Oval, Hobart
Umpires: Muhammad Qureshi and Simon Burns
Player of the match: Lizelle Lee (Hobart Hurricanes)

- Melbourne Renegades won the toss and elected to field.

Match 52
24 November 2023
15:10 UTC+10:30
Scorecard

Brisbane Heat; 8/160 (20 overs)	v	Sydney Thunder; 9/138 (20 overs)
Bess Heath 29 (25); Sammy-Jo Johnson 3/39 (4 overs)		Chamari Athapaththu 34 (28); Jess Jonassen 4/26 (4 overs)

Brisbane Heat won by 22 runs
Adelaide Oval, Adelaide
Umpires: Eloise Sheridan and Harry Singh
Player of the match: Jess Jonassen (Brisbane Heat)

- Brisbane Heat won the toss and elected to bat.

Match 53
24 November 2023
18:40 UTC+10:30 (N)
Scorecard

Perth Scorchers; 104 (19.4 overs)	v	Adelaide Strikers; 5/106 (14.5 overs)
Sophie Devine 30 (34); Darcie Brown 3/18 (4 overs)		Madeline Penna 31* (23); Sophie Devine 3/20 (2 overs)

Adelaide Strikers won by 5 wickets
Adelaide Oval, Adelaide
Umpires: Eloise Sheridan and Peter George
Player of the match: Darcie Brown (Adelaide Strikers)

- Adelaide Strikers won the toss and elected to field.

Match 54
25 November 2023
18:10 UTC+11 (N)
Scorecard

Melbourne Stars; 118 (20 overs)	v	Melbourne Renegades; 2/27 (5.3 overs)
Annabel Sutherland 36 (28); Harmanpreet Kaur 2/13 (3 overs)		Hayley Matthews 17* (10); Kim Garth 2/2 (2 overs)

Melbourne Stars won by 8 runs (DLS Method)
Melbourne Cricket Ground, Melbourne
Umpires: Chris Grant and Lisa McCabe
Player of the match: Kim Garth (Melbourne Stars)

- Melbourne Stars won the toss and elected to bat.
- No further play was possible due to rain.

Match 55
26 November 2023
10:10 UTC+11
Scorecard

Adelaide Strikers; 3/164 (20 overs)	v	Hobart Hurricanes; 87 (16 overs)
Laura Wolvaardt 73 (65); Nicola Carey 2/39 (4 overs)		Hayley Silver-Holmes 14 (14); Tahlia McGrath 3/8 (2 overs)

Adelaide Strikers won by 77 runs
Sydney Cricket Ground, Sydney
Umpires: Andrew Hamilton and Troy Penman
Player of the match: Tahlia McGrath (Adelaide Strikers)

- Hobart Hurricanes won the toss and elected to field.

Match 56
26 November 2023
13:40 UTC+11
Scorecard

Sydney Thunder; 123 (19.5 overs)	v	Sydney Sixers; 1/126 (17.3 overs)
Heather Knight 38 (38); Ashleigh Gardner 4/26 (4 overs)		Ellyse Perry 82* (60); Hannah Darlington 1/35 (3 overs)

Sydney Sixers won by 9 wickets
Sydney Cricket Ground, Sydney
Umpires: David Taylo and Roberto Howard
Player of the match: Ellyse Perry (Sydney Sixers)

- Sydney Thunder won the toss and elected to bat.

== Knockout stage ==
Eliminator
3	Brisbane Heat	8/169
4	Sydney Thunder	9/125

Challenger
2	Perth Scorchers	8/130
3	Brisbane Heat	5/197

Final
1	Adelaide Strikers	5/125
3	Brisbane Heat	8/122

=== Eliminator ===
28 November 2023
16:40 UTC+8 (N)
Scorecard

Brisbane Heat; 8/169 (20 overs)	v	Sydney Thunder; 9/125 (20 overs)
Amelia Kerr 48 (32); Hannah Darlington 3/42 (4 overs)		Chamari Athapaththu 41 (40); Courtney Sippel 3/9 (4 overs)

Brisbane Heat won by 44 runs
WACA Ground, Perth
Umpires: Stephen Dionysius and Eloise Sheridan
Player of the match: Amelia Kerr (Brisbane Heat)

- Sydney Thunder won the toss and elected to field.

=== Challenger ===
29 November 2023
16:40 UTC+8 (N)
Scorecard

Brisbane Heat; 5/197 (20 overs)	v	Perth Scorchers; 8/130 (20 overs)
Grace Harris 54 (33); Alana King 3/30 (4 overs)		Nat Sciver-Brunt 36 (27); Georgia Voll 4/19 (4 overs)

Brisbane Heat won by 67 runs
WACA Ground, Perth
Umpires: Troy Penman and David Taylor
Player of the match: Grace Harris (Brisbane Heat)

- Brisbane Heat won the toss and elected to bat.

=== Final ===
2 December 2023
18:40 UTC+10:30 (N)
Scorecard

Adelaide Strikers; 5/125 (20 overs)	v	Brisbane Heat; 8/122 (20 overs)
Laura Wolvaardt 39 (33); Nicola Hancock 3/23 (4 overs)		Amelia Kerr 30* (32); Amanda-Jade Wellington 3/16 (4 overs)

Adelaide Strikers won by 3 runs
Adelaide Oval, Adelaide
Umpires: Claire Polosak and Eloise Sheridan
Player of the match: Amanda-Jade Wellington (Adelaide Strikers)

- Adelaide Strikers won the toss and elected to bat

== Statistics ==
=== Highest totals ===
Team	Score	Against	Venue	Date
Brisbane Heat	7/229 (20 overs)	Perth Scorchers	North Sydney Oval, Sydney	22 October 2023
Hobart Hurricanes	3/212 (20 overs)	Melbourne Renegades	Bellerive Oval, Hobart	23 November 2023
Sydney Thunder	4/204 (20 overs)	Brisbane Heat	North Sydney Oval, Sydney	6 November 2023
Brisbane Heat	5/197 (20 overs)	Perth Scorchers	WACA Ground, Perth	29 November 2023
Brisbane Heat	5/196 (20 overs)	Sydney Thunder	North Sydney Oval, Sydney	6 November 2023

- Source: CricInfo

=== Most runs ===
Player	Team	Runs
Beth Mooney	Perth Scorchers	557
Chamari Athapaththu	Sydney Thunder	552
Grace Harris	Brisbane Heat	501
Ellyse Perry	Sydney Sixers	496
Sophie Devine	Perth Scorchers	489

- Source: CricInfo

=== Most wickets ===
Player	Team	Wickets
Sophie Day	Melbourne Stars	27
Jess Jonassen	Brisbane Heat	24
Amanda-Jade Wellington	Adelaide Strikers	23
Annabel Sutherland	Melbourne Stars	23
Nicola Hancock	Brisbane Heat	23

- Source: CricInfo

== Awards ==
=== Team of the tournament ===
The team of the tournament was announced on 27 November 2023, as selected by the eight head coaches of the participating teams.

- Beth Mooney (wk) (Perth Scorchers)
- Katie Mack (Adelaide Strikers)
- Chamari Athapaththu (Sydney Thunder)
- Sophie Devine (c) (Perth Scorchers)
- Ellyse Perry (Sydney Sixers)
- Annabel Sutherland (Melbourne Stars)
- Amanda-Jade Wellington (Adelaide Strikers)
- Amy Edgar (Perth Scorchers)
- Chloe Ainsworth (Perth Scorchers)
- Lauren Cheatle (Sydney Sixers)
- Sophie Day (Melbourne Stars)
- 12th: Charli Knott (Brisbane Heat)

== See also ==
- 2023–24 Big Bash League season
