= Bonnie Berry =

Australian cricketer

Personal information
- Born: 24 February 2006 (age 20); Emerald, Queensland, Australia
- Batting: Right-handed
- Bowling: Right-arm medium-fast
- Role: Bowler

Domestic team information
- Years: Team
- 2022–present: Queensland
- 2023–present: Brisbane Heat
- Source: Cricinfo, 3 October 2026

Bonnie Berry (born 24 February 2006) is an Australian cricketer who plays as a right-arm medium-fast bowler and right-handed batter. She represents Queensland Fire in the Women's National Cricket League (WNCL) and the Brisbane Heat in the Women's Big Bash League (WBBL).

== Early life and career ==
Berry was born in Emerald, Queensland. She developed through the Queensland cricket pathway and played cricket in Rockhampton before representing the Sunshine Coast Scorchers in Queensland Premier Cricket.

She progressed through Queensland Country cricket before earning selection in the Queensland Fire squad. In May 2023, she was awarded her first Queensland Fire contract ahead of the 2023–24 season.

== Domestic career ==
Berry made her debut for Queensland in the Women's National Cricket League in February 2023.

She was initially involved with the Brisbane Heat as a local replacement player during the 2023–24 WBBL season. She was added to the Heat squad for the WBBL final after replacing the injured Grace Parsons, although she did not make her WBBL debut at that time.

In July 2024, Berry signed her first full WBBL contract with Brisbane Heat ahead of the 2024–25 season. She joined fellow emerging Queensland players Sianna Ginger and Mikayla Wrigley as new Heat signings.

Berry is a pace bowler who has been regarded as an emerging player within the Queensland cricket system. She was included in the Australia Under-19 squad that toured Sri Lanka in April 2024.

During the 2025–26 season, Berry represented Queensland in the WNCL and Brisbane Heat in the WBBL. She also played in the T20 Spring Challenge for the Heat.

Berry was retained by Brisbane Heat for WBBL|12, with the club confirming her return alongside Lucinda Bourke, Mikayla Wrigley and Annie O'Neil.

== International career ==
Berry was selected in the Australia Under-19 squad for the tour of Sri Lanka in April 2024.

She played in the 2024 Women's Under-19 Tri-Nation Series involving Australia, Sri Lanka and England. In the series, she took four wickets, including 3/19 in an Under-19 ODI.
