= Katie White =

Katie White may refer to:

- Katie White (musician) (born 1983), English musician
- Katie White (politician) (born 1980/81), British politician

== See also ==
- Katharine White (disambiguation)
