= 2023–24 Women's Big Bash League Final =

2023 WBBL cricket tournament final in Australia

- Event: 2023–24 Women's Big Bash League
| Adelaide Strikers | Brisbane Heat |
| 125/5 | 122/8 |
| 20 overs | 20 overs |
- Adelaide Strikers won by 3 runs
- Date: 2 December 2023
- Venue: Adelaide Oval, Adelaide
- Player of the match: Amanda-Jade Wellington (Adelaide Strikers)
- Umpires: Claire Polosak; Eloise Sheridan

The 2023 Women's Big Bash League Final was played on 2 December 2023 at the Adelaide Oval in Adelaide. It was a Day/Night Twenty20 match, which decided the winner of the 2023 season. Adelaide Strikers won the match and the title by defeating Brisbane Heat by 3 runs.

== Road to the final ==
| Adelaide Strikers | | | vs | Brisbane Heat |
League Stage
| Opponent | Scorecard | Result | Match No. | Opponent | Scorecard | Result |
| Melbourne Stars | 21 October 2023 | Won | 1 | Melbourne Renegades | 20 October 2023 | Won |
| Melbourne Renegades | 23 October 2023 | Lost | 2 | Perth Scorchers | 22 October 2023 | Won |
| Melbourne Stars | 24 October 2023 | Won | 3 | Sydney Sixers | 24 October 2023 | Won |
| Hobart Hurricanes | 27 October 2023 | Lost | 4 | Melbourne Stars | 29 October 2023 | Won |
| Brisbane Heat | 29 October 2023 | Won | 5 | Adelaide Strikers | 27 October 2023 | Lost |
| Sydney Sixers | 3 November 2023 | Won | 6 | Hobart Hurricanes | 4 November 2023 | Won |
| Perth Scorchers | 5 November 2023 | Won | 7 | Sydney Thunder | 6 November 2023 | Lost |
| Melbourne Renegades | 8 November 2023 | Won | 8 | Perth Scorchers | 9 November 2023 | Lost |
| Brisbane Heat | 11 November 2023 | Lost | 9 | Adelaide Strikers | 11 November 2023 | Won |
| Sydney Thunder | 15 November 2023 | Won | 10 | Hobart Hurricanes | 15 November 2023 | Won |
| Sydney Sixers | 18 November 2023 | Won | 11 | Melbourne Renegades | 17 November 2023 | Lost |
| Sydney Thunder | 21 November 2023 | Won | 12 | Melbourne Stars | 19 November 2023 | Won |
| Perth Scorchers | 24 November 2023 | Won | 13 | Sydney Sixers | 21 November 2023 | Lost |
| Hobart Hurricanes | 26 November 2023 | Won | 14 | Sydney Thunder | 24 November 2023 | Won |
Playoff stage
Qualifier
| Opponent | Scorecard | Result | Titles | Opponent | Scorecard | Result |
| Qualified for the finals | | | E | Sydney Thunder | 28 November 2023 | Won |
| Qualified for the finals | | | C | Perth Scorchers | 30 November 2023 | Won |

== Match ==
=== Match officials ===
- On-field umpires: Claire Polosak and Eloise Sheridan
- Third umpire: Troy Penman
- Match referee: David Johnston
- Toss: Adelaide Strikers won the toss and elected to bat.

=== Summary ===
2 December 2023
18:40 UTC+10:30 (N)
Scorecard

| Adelaide Strikers; 5/125 (20 overs) | v | Brisbane Heat; 8/122 (20 overs) |
| Laura Wolvaardt 39 (33); Nicola Hancock 3/23 (4 overs) | | Amelia Kerr 30* (32); Amanda-Jade Wellington 3/16 (4 overs) |

Adelaide Strikers won by 3 runs
Adelaide Oval, Adelaide
Umpires: Claire Polosak and Eloise Sheridan
Player of the match: Amanda-Jade Wellington (Adelaide Strikers)

- Adelaide Strikers won the toss and elected to bat
