= Lucy Finn =

Australian cricketer

Personal information
- Full name: Lucy Elizabeth Finn
- Born: January 2, 2007 (age 19); Hurstville, New South Wales, Australia
- Batting: Right-handed
- Bowling: Right-arm medium
- Role: All-rounder

Domestic team information
- Years: Team
- 2025–present: New South Wales
- 2025–present: Sydney Thunder

Career statistics
Competition	WT20
Matches	7
Runs scored	65
Batting average	65.00
100s/50s	0/0
Top score	49
Balls bowled	108
Wickets	6
Bowling average	24.00
5 wickets in innings	0
10 wickets in match	0
Best bowling	2/10
Catches/stumpings	0/–
- Source: Cricinfo, 21 September 2026

Lucy Elizabeth Finn (born 2 January 2007) is an Australian cricketer who plays for the Sydney Thunder and New South Wales Breakers. An all-rounder, she bowls right-arm medium pace and bats right-handed.

== Early life ==
Finn was born on 2 January 2007 in Hurstville, New South Wales. She progressed through youth ranks, earning representation for the Australia Under-19s women's team.

== Domestic career ==
=== Sydney Thunder ===
Finn made her Women's Big Bash League (WBBL) debut for the Sydney Thunder during the 2025–26 season (WBBL|11). She had a breakout debut summer, playing seven matches for the franchise. Demonstrating her all-round capabilities, she took six wickets at an average of 24.00, with best bowling figures of 2/10. With the bat, she scored 65 runs at an average of 65.00 and a strike rate of 114.03.

Her most notable innings during this period was an unbeaten 49 batting at number 8 in a "Sydney Smash" derby match, where she arrived at the crease with her team in trouble at 6/42 and helped stabilize the innings. Following her impressive debut season, Finn signed a two-year contract extension with the Thunder, securing her stay with the club ahead of WBBL|12.

=== New South Wales ===
Following her strong performances in the WBBL, Finn earned a call-up to the New South Wales Breakers senior squad and was named on their 2026–27 contract list.

In just her second WNCL match, against Tasmania in February 2026, Finn produced a notable rescue effort. Walking in with the Breakers struggling at 5/76, she scored 64 runs and shared a crucial 128-run partnership with Sarah Coyte to save the innings. In the same match, she claimed her first WNCL wickets, including the international batter Lizelle Lee, finishing with bowling figures of 2/23.
