= Kathleen White =

Kathleen White may refer to:

- Kathleen Merrell White (1889−1973), American Protestant minister and author
- Kathleen Hartnett White (born c. 1949), American government official and environmental policy advisor

== See also ==
- Kathleen Whyte (1909−1996), Scottish embroiderer and art teacher
