= Katharine White =

Katharine White (or variants) may refer to:

== Writers ==
- Katharine S. White (1892–1977), writer and fiction editor for The New Yorker magazine
- Kate White (writer) (born 1951), editor-in-chief of Cosmopolitan magazine from 1998 to 2012
- Cat White (born 1993), author, actress, producer and advisor for the United Nations
- Kathryn White (born 1956), British children's book author

== Sportspeople ==
- Catherine White (swimmer) (born 1965), British swimmer
- Kathryn White (cricketer) (born 1978), Scottish cricket player
- Catherine White (ice hockey) (born 1990), Canadian ice hockey player

== Others ==
- Catherine White (doctor), British forensic physician
- Katharine Elkus White (1906–1985), New Jersey politician and United States Ambassador to Denmark
- Katie White (musician) (born 1983), English musician with The Ting Tings
- Catherine White Coffin, wife of abolitionist Levi Coffin
- Kate White (politician), Canadian politician in Yukon
- Katherine Elisabeth White, better known as Marie Wilson
- Katherine White, regent of the University of Michigan

== See also ==
- Kathleen White (disambiguation)
