= Claire Moore (cricketer) =

Australian cricketer

Personal information
- Full name: Claire Francis Moore
- Born: 28 October 2003 (age 23); Richmond, New South Wales, Australia
- Batting: Right-handed
- Bowling: Right-arm medium
- Role: Batter

Domestic team information
- Years: Team
- 2021/22: Sydney Sixers
- 2021/22–present: New South Wales
- 2023/24–present: Sydney Thunder

Career statistics
Competition	WLA	WT20
Matches	40	26
Runs scored	774	50
Batting average	22.76	6.25
100s/50s	0/6	0/0
Top score	78	18*
Catches/stumpings	6/–	2/–
- Source: CricketArchive, 12 March 2026

Claire Francis Moore (born 28 October 2003) is an Australian cricketer who plays as a right-handed batter for the New South Wales Breakers in the Women's National Cricket League (WNCL). She made her professional debut in the first match of the 2021–22 WBBL season for Sydney Sixers against Melbourne Stars, but did not bat or bowl.

== International career ==
In December 2022, Moore was selected in the Australia Under-19 squad for the 2023 ICC Under-19 Women's T20 World Cup.
