= Mikayla Wrigley =

Australian cricketer

Personal information
- Born: 12 February 2004 (age 22)
- Batting: Right-handed
- Bowling: Right-arm pace
- Role: Batter, wicket-keeper

Domestic team information
- Years: Team
- 2024–present: Queensland
- 2024–present: Brisbane Heat
- Source: Cricinfo, 3 October 2026

Mikayla Wrigley (born 12 February 2004) is an Australian cricketer who plays as a right-handed batter and wicket-keeper. She represents Queensland Fire in the Women's National Cricket League (WNCL) and the Brisbane Heat in the Women's Big Bash League (WBBL).

== Early life and career ==
Wrigley developed through the Queensland cricket pathway and represented the Sunshine Coast Scorchers in Queensland Premier Cricket. She twice won the Kath Smith Medal as the best and fairest player in the Katherine Raymont Shield competition and was named Queensland Country Player of the Year.

She was selected in the Australian Country Cricket team after helping the Queensland Country Brolgas win their first Toyota Australian Country Cricket title in Newcastle.

Wrigley was also selected in the Cricket Australia XI under-16 team for the under-18 national championships held in Hobart and Launceston in January 2020.

== Domestic career ==
Wrigley produced consecutive seasons of more than 750 runs in the Katherine Raymont Shield before receiving her first Queensland Fire contract.

She made her debut for Queensland in the Women's National Cricket League during the 2024–25 season. In October 2025, she scored 250 not out from 172 balls in a Katherine Raymont Shield match, setting a new record for the highest individual score in the competition.

She scored her maiden WNCL half-century in September 2025, making 56 against the ACT Meteors.

=== Women's Big Bash League ===
Wrigley joined the Brisbane Heat for the 2024–25 WBBL season. She was subsequently selected as the 15th and final contracted player in the Brisbane Heat squad for WBBL|11.

During the 2025–26 season, Wrigley played eight matches for Brisbane Heat.

She was retained by the Brisbane Heat for WBBL|12.

As of October 2026, she has played 12 WBBL matches, scoring 140 runs at a strike rate of 104.48, with a highest score of 32. She has also taken three catches.
