= Charis Bekker =

Australian cricketer

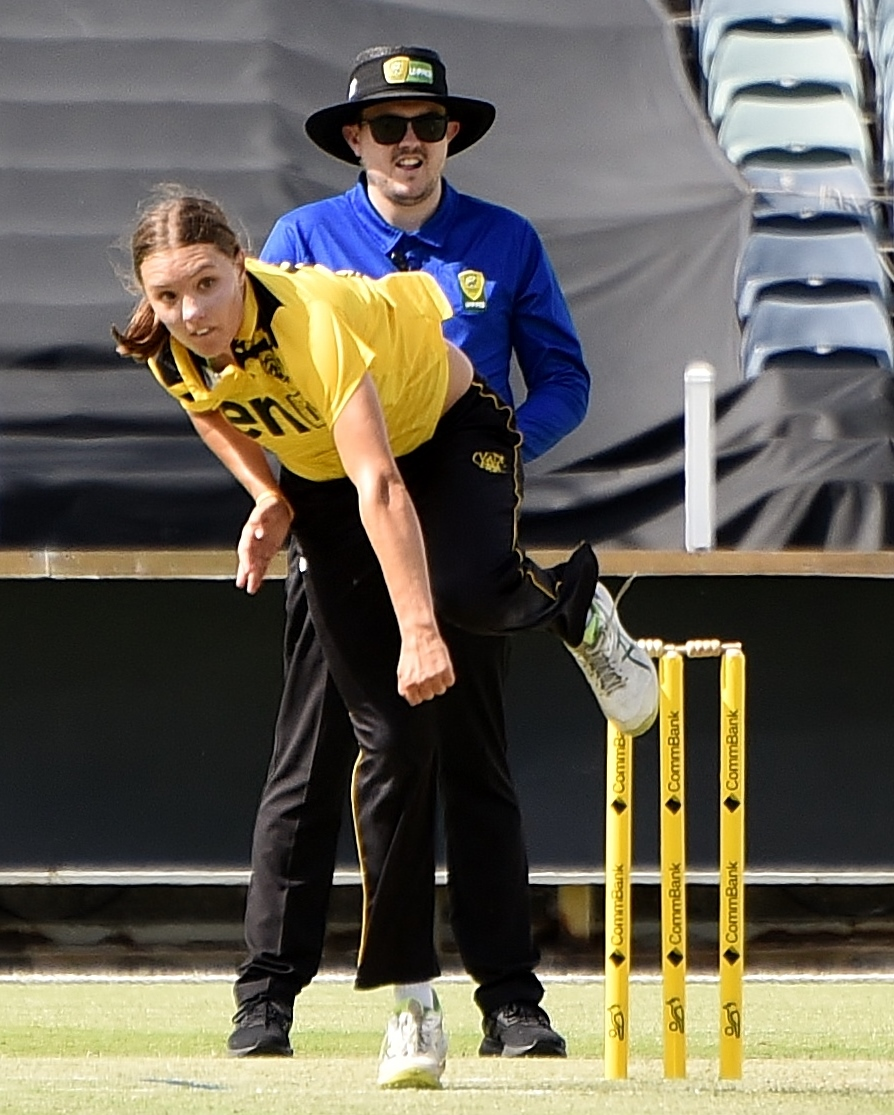
- Bekker bowling for WA in December 2022

Personal information
- Full name: Charis Bekker
- Born: 14 March 2004 (age 22)
- Batting: Right-handed
- Bowling: Slow left-arm orthodox, Slow left-arm unorthodox
- Role: All-rounder

Domestic team information
- Years: Team
- 2021/22–2025/26: Western Australia
- 2022/23–2023/24: Perth Scorchers
- 2024/25–2025: Melbourne Renegades (squad no. 1)

Career statistics
Competition	WLA	WT20
Matches	19	4
Runs scored	142	20
Batting average	16.25	–
100s/50s	0/0	0/0
Top score	38	11
Balls bowled	257	80
Wickets	3	3
Bowling average	79.33	40.00
5 wickets in innings	0	0
10 wickets in match	0	0
Best bowling	1/9	2/32
Catches/stumpings	3/–	1/–
- Source: CricketArchive, 3 March 2023

Charis Bekker (born 14 March 2004) is a former Australian cricketer who played as a right-handed batter and left arm spin bowler for Western Australia in the Women's National Cricket League (WNCL) and Melbourne Renegades in the Women's Big Bash League (WBBL).

== Domestic career ==
Bekker plays grade cricket for Subiaco-Floreat Cricket Club. She made her debut for Western Australia on 27 February 2022, against South Australia in the WNCL. She went on to play five matches overall for the side that season, including scoring 36* against South Australia and taking 2/25 from her 10 overs against Queensland. She played ten matches for the side in the 2022–23 WNCL, scoring 83 runs and taking two wickets. She was also in the Perth Scorchers squad in the 2022–23 WBBL, but did not play a match.

Bekker retired from cricket ahead of WBBL|12, moving to the United States to study at university.

== International career ==
In December 2022, Bekker was selected in the Australia Under-19 squad for the 2023 ICC Under-19 Women's T20 World Cup. She played two matches at the tournament, taking one wicket.
