= Sophie Day =

Australian cricketer

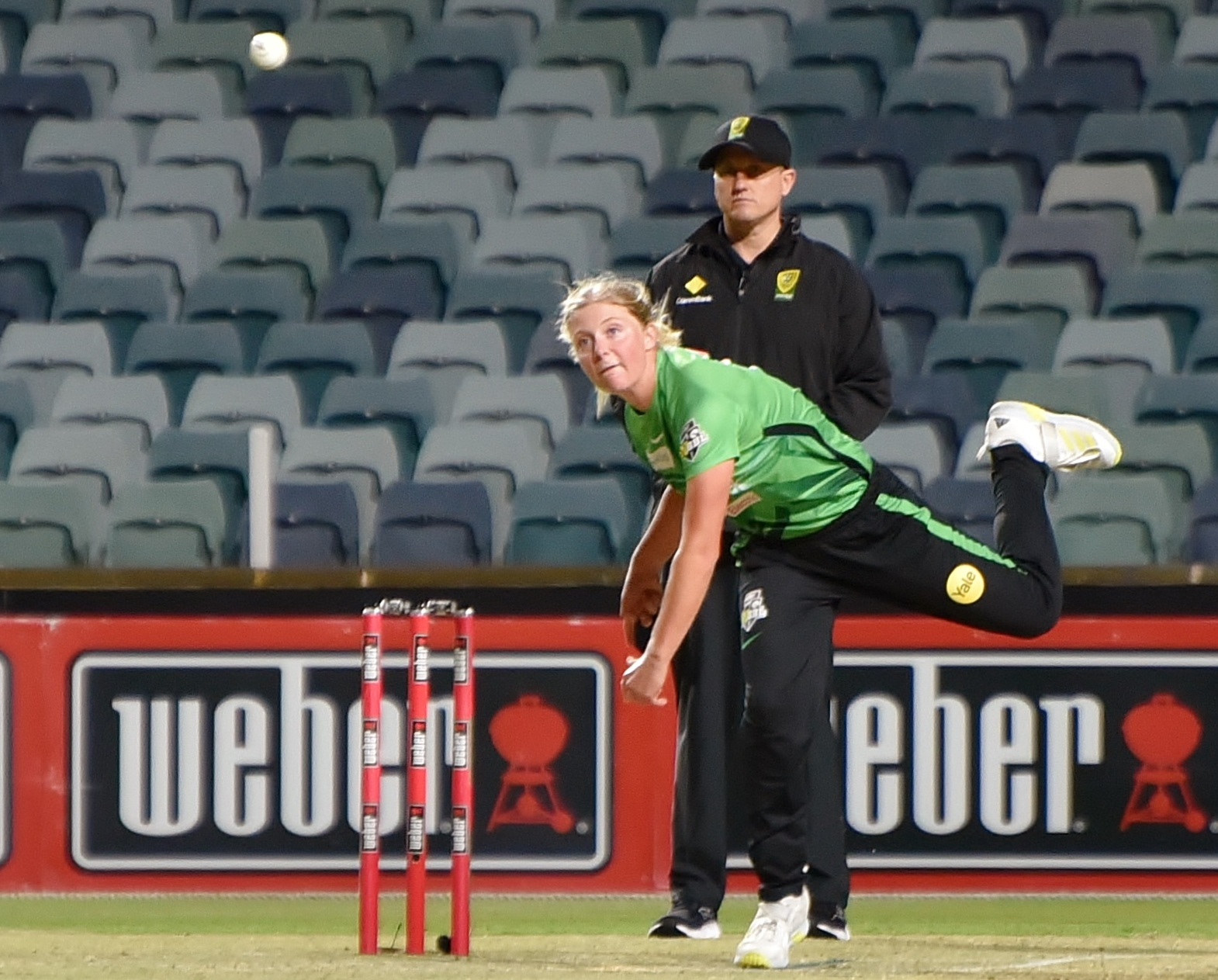
- Day bowling for Melbourne Stars in October 2022

Personal information
- Full name: Sophie Fitzpatrick Day
- Born: 2 September 1998 (age 28); Greensborough, Victoria, Australia
- Batting: Left-handed
- Bowling: Slow left-arm orthodox
- Role: All-rounder

Domestic team information
- Years: Team
- 2019: Berkshire
- 2020/21–present: Melbourne Stars
- 2020/21–present: Victoria

Career statistics
Competition	WLA	WT20
Matches	38	61
Runs scored	234	43
Batting average	20.38	19.87
100s/50s	0/0	0/0
Top score	27*	10*
Balls bowled	1,556	1,012
Wickets	49	62
Bowling average	23.53	18.95
5 wickets in innings	1	1
10 wickets in match	0	0
Best bowling	5/41	5/25
Catches/stumpings	3/–	9/–
- Source: CricketArchive, 8 July 2023

Sophie Fitzpatrick Day (born 2 September 1998) is an Australian cricketer who plays for Victoria in the Women's National Cricket League (WNCL) and the Melbourne Stars in the Women's Big Bash League (WBBL). An all-rounder, she is a left-handed batter and slow left-arm orthodox bowler. She also played county cricket for Berkshire in 2019.

Off the field, Day is a professional artist who has studied Fine Arts at the Victorian College of the Arts, the arts school of the University of Melbourne.
