= Lucinda Bourke =

Australian cricketer

Personal information
- Born: 2 September 2005 (age 21); Warwick, Queensland, Australia
- Batting: Left-handed
- Bowling: Right-arm off spin
- Role: Batter

Domestic team information
- Years: Team
- 2024–present: Queensland
- 2024–present: Brisbane Heat
- Source: Cricinfo, 3 October 2026

Lucinda Bourke (born 2 September 2005), also known as Lucy Bourke, is an Australian cricketer who plays as a left-handed batter and right-arm off-spin bowler. She is currently contracted to Queensland in the Women's National Cricket League (WNCL) and the Brisbane Heat in the Women's Big Bash League (WBBL).

== Early life and career ==
Bourke was born in Warwick, Queensland. She developed through Queensland's junior cricket pathways and represented Queensland at underage level. She played club cricket for Valley District Cricket Club and was a member of the Valley side that won the Katherine Raymont Shield.

In 2023, Bourke represented Australia in rugby sevens at the 2023 Commonwealth Youth Games in Trinidad and Tobago, where Australia won the gold medal.

Bourke was named in the Queensland under-19 women's squad for the 2024 National Female Championships in Perth.

== Domestic career ==
In May 2024, Bourke was awarded her maiden Queensland Fire contract for the 2024–25 season. During the 2023–24 season, she scored 107 for Valley in the Katherine Raymont Shield and also represented Queensland at under-19 level.

She joined the Brisbane Heat for the 2024–25 Women's Big Bash League season and played for the team in the T20 Spring Challenge before making her Queensland debut in the WNCL.

In August 2025, Bourke was re-signed by Brisbane Heat for the WBBL|11 season. She made her WBBL debut during the 2025–26 season.

As of October 2026, Bourke remains contracted to the Brisbane Heat for WBBL|12.
