= Sianna Ginger =

Australian cricketer

Personal information
- Full name: Sianna Ushandi Ginger
- Born: 26 July 2005 (age 21); Townsville, Queensland, Australia
- Batting: Right-handed
- Bowling: Right-arm fast-medium
- Role: All-rounder

Domestic team information
- Years: Team
- 2022/23–present: Queensland

Career statistics
Competition	WLA	WT20
Matches	17	7
Runs scored	227	111
Batting average	13.35	15.86
100s/50s	0/0	0/0
Top score	37	46
Balls bowled	304	132
Wickets	11	7
Bowling average	26.00	24.00
5 wickets in innings	0	0
10 wickets in match	0	0
Best bowling	4-49	3-14
Catches/stumpings	0/–	0/-
- Source: CricketArchive, 1 March 2023

Sianna Ushandi Ginger (born 26 July 2005) is an Australian cricketer who currently plays for Queensland in the Women's National Cricket League (WNCL). She plays as a right-handed batter and right-arm fast-medium bowler.

== Domestic career ==
Ginger plays grade cricket for Valley District Cricket Club. In December 2022, Ginger captained Queensland at the Cricket Australia Under-19 National Female Championships, and was the third-highest run-scorer in the tournament, with 237 runs. Ginger was first named in a senior Queensland squad in February 2023. She made her debut for the side on 17 February 2023, against South Australia in the WNCL, scoring 33 runs. She followed this up two days later by scoring 35 from 30 deliveries against the same opposition.

== International career ==
In December 2022, Ginger was named in the Australia Under-19 squad for the 2023 ICC Under-19 Women's T20 World Cup. She played five matches in the tournament, scoring 55 runs and taking seven wickets at an average of 5.57. She took figures of 3/13 against both India and England.

Ginger took her first five-wicket haul in List A cricket against England A on 2 April 2025. She scored her first century in first-class cricket against India A on 23 August 2025.
