= Sara Kennedy =

Australian cricketer

Personal information
- Full name: Sara C Kennedy
- Born: 7 August 2007 (age 19)
- Batting: Right-handed
- Bowling: Left-arm medium
- Role: Bowler

Domestic team information
- Years: Team
- 2023/24–present: Melbourne Renegades

Career statistics
Competition	WT20
Matches	14
Runs scored	12
Batting average	4.00
100s/50s	0/0
Top score	6*
Balls bowled	222
Wickets	8
Bowling average	37.00
5 wickets in innings	0
10 wickets in match	0
Best bowling	2/20
Catches/stumpings	2/–
- Source: CricketArchive, 10 March 2024

Sara C Kennedy (born 7 August 2007) is an Australian cricketer who currently plays for Melbourne Renegades in the Women's Big Bash League (WBBL). She plays as a left-arm medium bowler.

== Early life ==
Kennedy was born on 7 August 2007. She attends Ballarat Clarendon College, and made history when she was picked for the boys' first XI.

== Domestic career ==
In 2022, Kennedy played for Victoria Country Under-19s at the Under-19 National Championships. She was again picked for the side for the 2023 Under-19 National Championships.

In October 2023, Kennedy was named in a squad for Melbourne Renegades for the first time, as an injury replacement player for Ellie Falconer. She made her debut for the side on 28 October 2023, against Sydney Sixers.

== International career ==
In December 2022, Kennedy was named as a non-travelling reserve for Australia Under-19s at the 2023 ICC Under-19 Women's T20 World Cup.
