= Hayley Silver-Holmes =

Australian cricketer (born 2003)

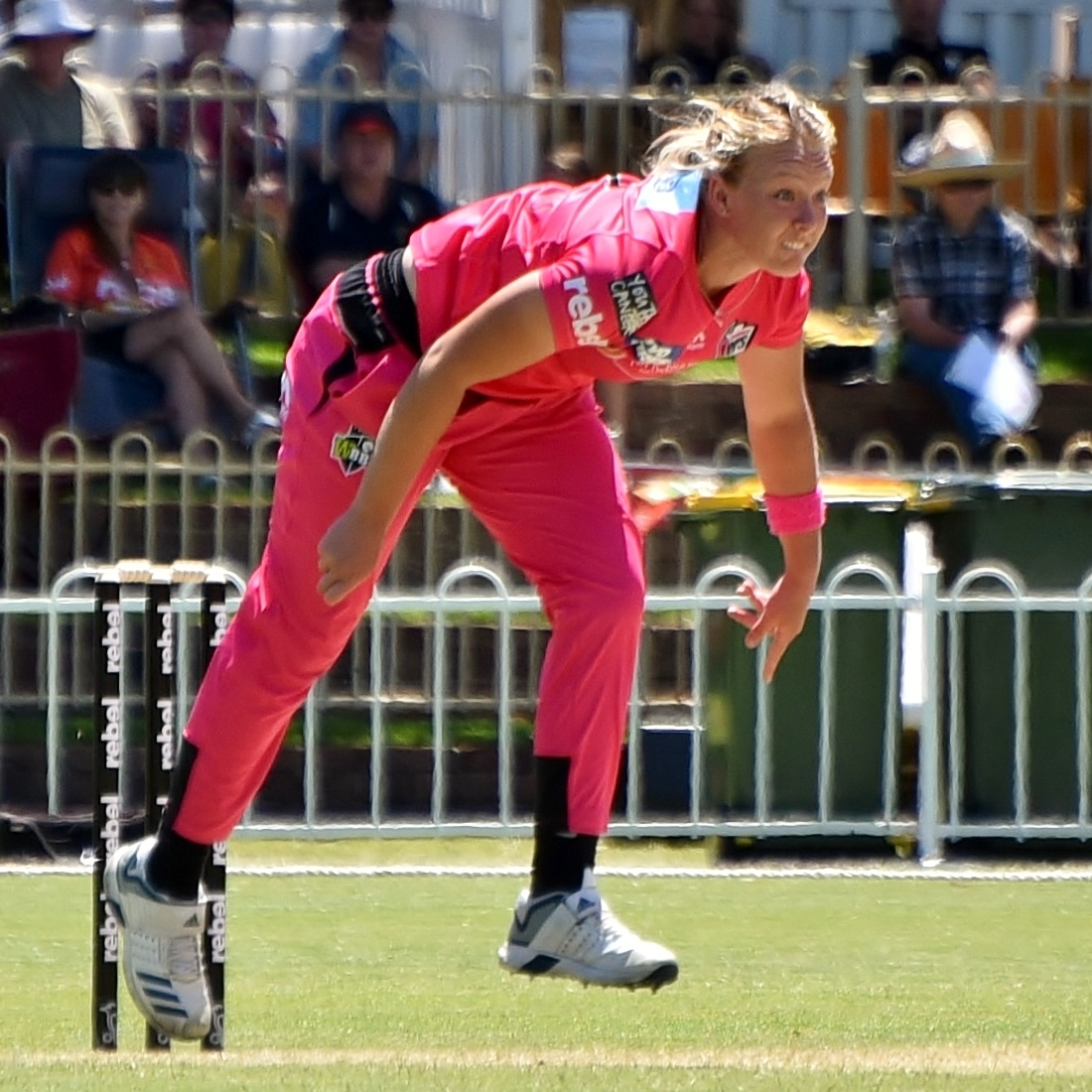
- Silver-Holmes bowling for Sydney Sixers during WBBL|05

Personal information
- Full name: Hayley Imogen Silver-Holmes
- Born: 18 August 2003 (age 23); Wahroonga, New South Wales, Australia
- Batting: Right-handed
- Bowling: Right-arm medium
- Role: Bowler

Domestic team information
- Years: Team
- 2018/19–2021/22: Sydney Sixers
- 2019/20–2020/21: New South Wales
- 2022/23–present: Hobart Hurricanes

Career statistics
Competition	WLA	WT20
Matches	32	46
Runs scored	181	85
Batting average	16.50	2.50
100s/50s	0/0	0/0
Top score	43*	25
Balls bowled	1,191	392
Wickets	34	18
Bowling average	26.56	30.67
5 wickets in innings	0	0
10 wickets in match	0	0
Best bowling	4/39	3/25
Catches/stumpings	5/–	6/–
- Source: CricketArchive, 29 March 2021

Hayley Imogen Silver-Holmes (born 18 August 2003) is an Australian cricketer who plays as a right-arm medium bowler and right-handed batter. She plays for the Tasmanian Tigers in the Women's National Cricket League (WNCL) and the Hobart Hurricanes in the Women's Big Bash League (WBBL). She made her senior debut for Sydney Sixers in 2018 at 15 years old, making her at the time the youngest debutant for the team. She was also the captain of the Australian under-15 team, and was selected for the under-19 team as a 14 year old.
