= Emma de Broughe =

Australian cricketer and field hockey player

Personal information
- Full name: Emma de Broughe
- Born: 6 September 2000 (age 26); Adelaide, South Australia
- Batting: Right-handed
- Bowling: Right-arm off break
- Role: Batter

Domestic team information
- Years: Team
- 2019/20–present: South Australia (squad no. 2)
- 2023/24–present: Melbourne Renegades

Career statistics
Competition	WLA	WT20
Matches	45	11
Runs scored	1,296	208
Batting average	28.80	18.91
100s/50s	1/9	0/1
Top score	112	54
Balls bowled	71	78
Wickets	5	4
Bowling average	10.60	22.25
5 wickets in innings	0	0
10 wickets in match	0	0
Best bowling	3/2	2/28
Catches/stumpings	7/–	2/–
- Source: CricketArchive, 11 October 2024

Emma de Broughe (born 6 September 2000) is an Australian cricketer and former field hockey player who plays for the South Australian Scorpions in the Women's National Cricket League, and for the Melbourne Renegades in the Women's Big Bash League. Originally a multi-sport athlete, de Broughe decided to switch to cricket following the COVID-19 pandemic.

== Cricket ==
Emma de Broughe plays for Sturt Cricket Club in SACA's Statewide Super 1st Grade competition. In the Women's National Cricket League (WNCL), De Broughe represents the South Australian Scorpions. She was first signed to the team in 2019 following standout performances in state competition and on the national stage.

In January 2024, de Broughe was named as the Betty Wilson Young Cricketer of the Year at the 2024 Australian Cricket Awards.

== Hockey ==
Emma de Broughe
Sport
- Sport: Field hockey
- Position: Forward
Senior career
Years	Team	Caps	Goals
2018	SA Suns	5	0
2019–	Adelaide Fire	7	2
National team
Years	Team	Caps	Goals
2019–	Australia U–21	8	(0)
Medal record
Women's field hockey
Representing Australia

=== Domestic career ===
In Hockey Australia's domestic competitions, Emma de Broughe represents her home state, South Australia (SA).

==== AHL and Hockey One ====
In 2018, De Broughe made her debut in the Australian Hockey League (AHL) for the SA Suns. Following the overhaul of the AHL, Hockey Australia subsequently introduced of a new domestic league, the Sultana Bran Hockey One League. De Broughe made her debut for SA's new representative team, the Adelaide Fire, in season one of the new league in 2019.

=== International career ===
Emma de Broughe first represented Australia at an FIH sanctioned event in 2018, during a qualifier for the 2018 Youth Olympic Games.

==== Under–21 ====
De Broughe made her debut for the Australia U–21, the Jillaroos, during a 2019 Tri–Nations Tournament in Canberra.

Following her debut in 2019, De Broughe represented the team again in 2020 during a four match test–series against Japan in Canberra.

== Personal life ==
Emma de Broughe was born and raised in Adelaide, South Australia. De Broughe studied at Sacred Heart College, graduating in 2018.
