= Ebony Hoskin =

Australian cricketer (born 2003)

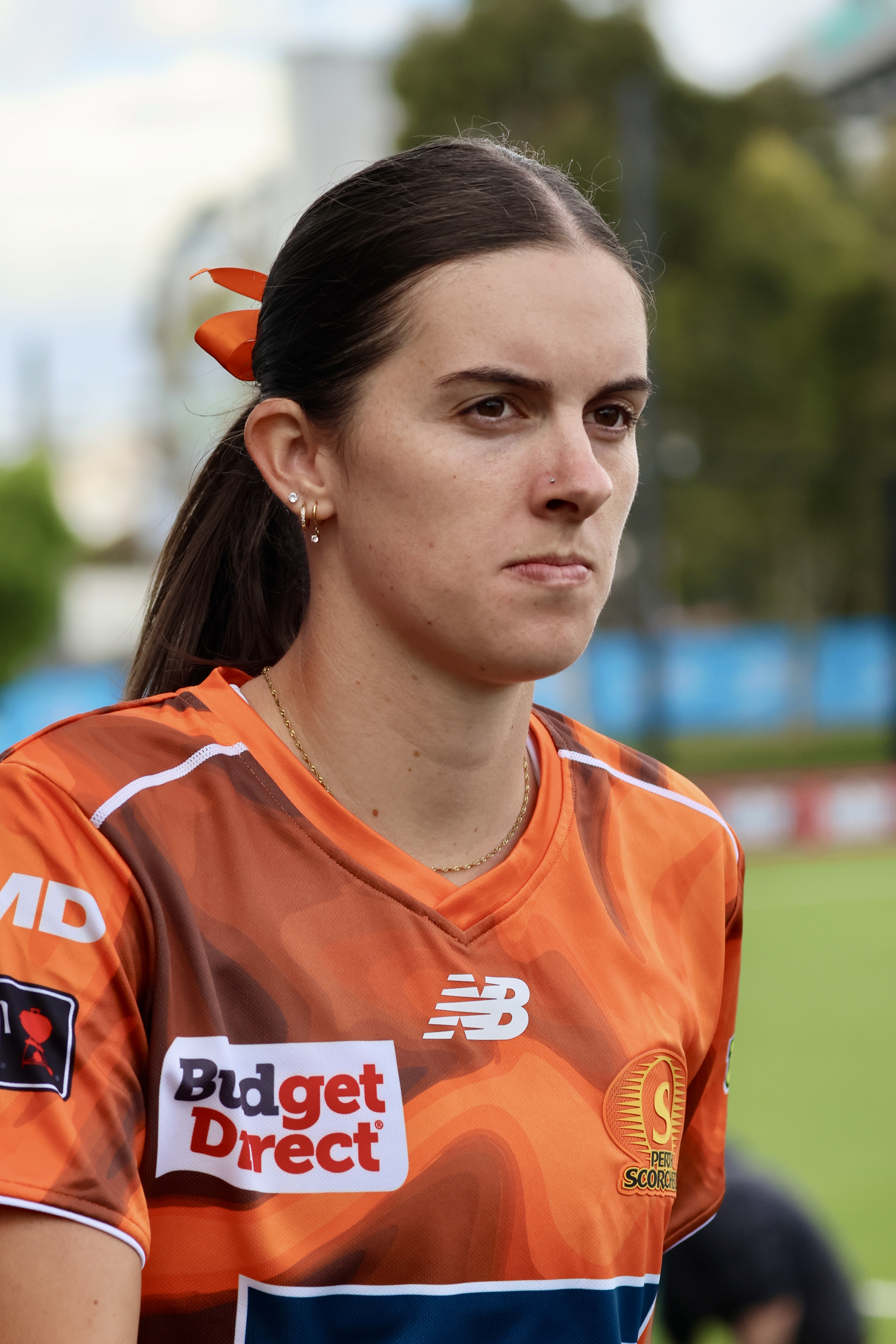

Personal information
- Full name: Ebony Hoskin
- Born: 23 March 2003 (age 23)
- Batting: Right-handed
- Bowling: Right-arm medium
- Role: Bowler

Domestic team information
- Years: Team
- 2022/23–present: New South Wales
- 2023/24: Sydney Thunder
- 2024/25–present: Perth Scorchers

Career statistics
Competition	WLA	WT20
Matches	13	5
Runs scored	8	1
Batting average	–	–
100s/50s	0/0	0/0
Top score	5*	1*
Balls bowled	384	36
Wickets	7	2
Bowling average	49.57	26.00
5 wickets in innings	0	0
10 wickets in match	0	0
Best bowling	3/39	1/14
Catches/stumpings	1/–	1/–
- Source: CricketArchive, 2 March 2023

Ebony Hoskin (born 23 March 2003) is an Australian cricketer who currently plays for New South Wales in the Women's National Cricket League (WNCL) and Perth Scorchers in the Women's Big Bash League (WBBL), after playing for the Sydney Thunder in the 2023/24 season. She plays as a right-arm medium bowler.

== Domestic career ==
Hoskin began training with New South Wales during the 2021–22 season, and played at that season's Under-19 National Championships. Ahead of the first match of the 2022–23 WNCL, an injury to Hannah Darlington allowed Hoskin to make her debut for New South Wales, against Queensland. Hoskin took a wicket with her first ball in state cricket, dismissing Georgia Redmayne, and overall took 3/39 from her 10 overs. She went on to play ten matches overall for the side that season, taking seven wickets at an average of 45.57.
