= Ella Wilson =

Australian cricketer

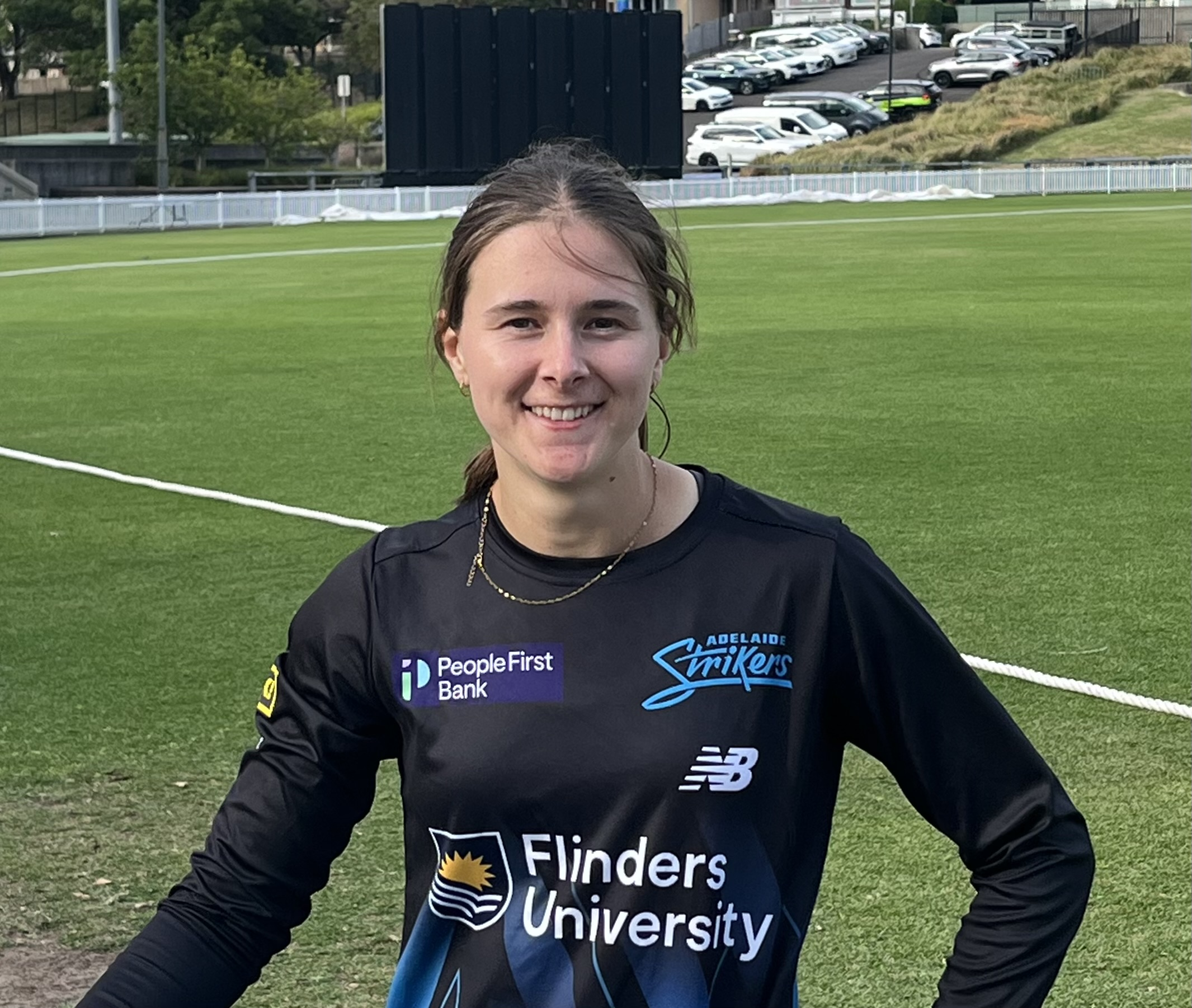
- Wilson in 2025

Personal information
- Full name: Ella Josephine Wilson
- Born: 17 November 2003 (age 22); Mount Barker, South Australia
- Batting: Right-handed
- Bowling: Right-arm medium
- Role: All-rounder

Domestic team information
- Years: Team
- 2022/23–present: South Australia (squad no. 8)
- 2024/25–present: Adelaide Strikers (squad no. 8)

Career statistics
Competition	WLA	WT20
Matches	9	1
Runs scored	66	19
Batting average	16.50	–
100s/50s	0/0	0/0
Top score	21	19*
Balls bowled	324	–
Wickets	5	–
Bowling average	64.40	–
5 wickets in innings	0	–
10 wickets in match	0	–
Best bowling	1/27	–
Catches/stumpings	5/–	0/–
- Source: CricketArchive, 20 October 2024

Ella Josephine Wilson (born 17 November 2003) is an Australian cricketer who currently plays for South Australia in the Women's National Cricket League (WNCL) and Adelaide Strikers in the Women's Big Bash League (WBBL). An all-rounder, she plays as a right-arm medium bowler and right-handed batter.

== Domestic career ==
Wilson plays grade cricket for Glenelg Cricket Club. In May 2022, Wilson received her first contract, signing with South Australia for the upcoming WNCL season. In September 2022, she was signed by Adelaide Strikers for the 2022–23 Women's Big Bash League, although she did not play a match for the side that season. In February 2023, Wilson made her debut for South Australia, against Queensland in the WNCL, taking 1/27 from her four overs. She went on to play three matches overall for South Australia that season, taking three wickets.

On 16 October 2024, Wilson made her Twenty20 for the Adelaide Strikers against the Brisbane Heat during the 2024 T20 Spring Challenge.

== International career ==
In December 2022, Wilson was named in the Australia Under-19 squad for the 2023 ICC Under-19 Women's T20 World Cup. She played five matches in the tournament.
