= Annie O'Neil =

Australian cricketer (born 1999)

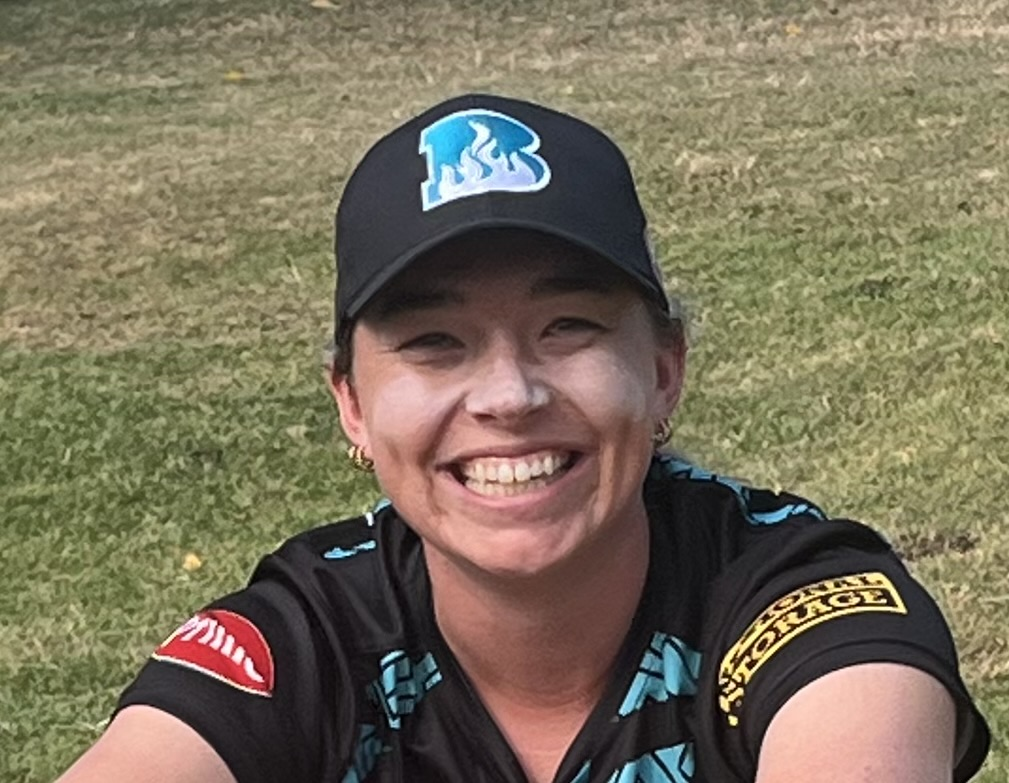
- O'Neil in October 2025

Personal information
- Full name: Annie Victoria O'Neil
- Born: 18 February 1999 (age 27); Murray Bridge, South Australia, Australia
- Batting: Right-handed
- Role: Batter

Domestic team information
- Years: Team
- 2018/19–2024/25: South Australia (squad no. 5)
- 2019/20-present: Adelaide Strikers (squad no. 5)
- 2025/26–present: Queensland

Career statistics
Competition	WLA	WT20
Matches	39	14
Runs scored	718	81
Batting average	21.11	11.57
100s/50s	0/2	0/0
Top score	86*	36
Catches/stumpings	17/–	3/–
- Source: CricketArchive, 14 October 2025

Annie Victoria O'Neil (born 18 February 1999) is an Australian cricketer who plays as a right-handed batter for the Queensland Fire in the Women's National Cricket League (WNCL) and the Adelaide Strikers in the Women's Big Bash League (WBBL).

== Career ==
O'Neil made her List A debut for South Australia on 1 February 2019 during the 2018–19 Women's National Cricket League season. She made her Twenty20 debut for the Adelaide Strikers on 1 December 2019.
