= 2018–19 Adelaide Strikers WBBL season =

Adelaide Strikers
2018–19 season
- Adelaide Strikers 2018–19 cap logo
- Coach: Andrea McCauley
- Captain(s): Suzie Bates
- Home ground: Karen Rolton Oval
- League: WBBL
- Record: 5–8 (6th)
- Finals: DNQ
- Leading Run Scorer: Sophie Devine – 556
- Leading Wicket Taker: Sophie Devine – 14
- Player of the Season: Sophie Devine

The 2018–19 Adelaide Strikers Women's season was the fourth in the team's history. Coached by Andrea McCauley and captained by Suzie Bates, they finished sixth in the regular season of WBBL|04 and failed to qualify for finals.

== Squad ==
Each 2018–19 squad featured 15 active players, with an allowance of up to five marquee signings including a maximum of three from overseas. Under a new rule, Australian marquees were classed as players who held a national women's team contract at the time of signing on for their WBBL|04 team.

Personnel changes before and during the season included:

- Sarah Coyte returned to the team for the first time since WBBL|02, having won the WBBL|03 championship playing with the Sydney Sixers.
- Overseas marquee Tammy Beaumont did not re-sign for the Strikers. The resulting vacant roster spot was filled by fellow England player Danielle Hazell.
- Local teenage all-rounder Eliza Doddridge completed the 15-player squad.
- Bridget Patterson fulfilled the wicket-keeping duties for the team in a 5 January 2019 match against the Brisbane Heat at Harrup Park, covering for Tegan McPharlin who had been granted leave.

The table below lists the Strikers players and their key stats (including runs scored, batting strike rate, wickets taken, economy rate, catches and stumpings) for the season.

No.	Name	Nat.	Birth date	Batting style	Bowling style	G	R	SR	W	E	C	S	Notes
Batters
11	Suzie Bates	(New Zealand)	16 September 1987	Right-handed	Right-arm medium	14	421	112.26	–	–	7	–	Captain, overseas marquee
9	Tahlia McGrath	(Australia)	10 November 1995	Right-handed	Right-arm medium	14	276	126.02	5	8.49	4	–	
13	Tabatha Saville	(Australia)	13 April 1998	Right-handed	Right-arm off spin	11	56	82.35	–	–	3	–	
All-rounders
77	Sophie Devine	(New Zealand)	1 September 1989	Right-handed	Right-arm medium fast	13	556	136.60	14	8.85	3	–	Overseas marquee
16	Eliza Doddridge	(Australia)	15 February 1999	Right-handed	Right-arm medium	–	–	–	–	–	–	–	
Wicket-keepers
7	Tegan McPharlin	(Australia)	7 August 1988	Right-handed	–	13	156	112.23	–	–	10	4	
21	Bridget Patterson	(Australia)	4 December 1994	Right-handed	Right-arm medium	14	204	100.00	–	–	6	0	
Bowlers
14	Samantha Betts	(Australia)	16 February 1996	Right-handed	Right-arm medium fast	5	5	45.45	1	12.40	2	–	
15	Sarah Coyte	(Australia)	30 March 1991	Right-handed	Right-arm medium fast	14	31	163.15	9	7.19	1	–	
3	Ellie Falconer	(Australia)	3 August 1999	Right-handed	Right-arm medium fast	–	–	–	–	–	–	–	
71	Danielle Hazell	(England)	13 May 1988	Right-handed	Right-arm off spin	13	6	54.54	9	7.81	1	–	Overseas marquee
18	Katelyn Pope	(Australia)	29 March 1996	Right-handed	Left-arm medium	2	–	–	0	12.00	0	–	
12	Alex Price	(Australia)	5 November 1995	Right-handed	Right-arm off spin	13	20	90.90	5	7.16	1	–	
27	Megan Schutt	(Australia)	15 January 1993	Right-handed	Right-arm medium fast	14	66	108.19	13	6.46	6	–	Australian marquee
10	Amanda-Jade Wellington	(Australia)	29 May 1997	Right-handed	Right-arm leg spin	14	63	123.52	10	7.12	5	–	Australian marquee

== Ladder ==
Pos	Team	Pld	W	L	NR	Pts	NRR
1	Sydney Sixers (RU)	14	10	4	0	20	0.509
2	Sydney Thunder	14	9	4	1	19	0.479
3	Brisbane Heat (C)	14	9	5	0	18	1.118
4	Melbourne Renegades	14	7	6	1	15	−0.079
5	Perth Scorchers	14	7	7	0	14	−0.476
6	Adelaide Strikers	14	5	8	1	11	−0.336
7	Melbourne Stars	14	5	8	1	11	−0.905
8	Hobart Hurricanes	14	2	12	0	4	−0.364

- The four top ranked teams qualified for the play-off phase

== Fixtures ==
All times are local time

Match 3
2 December 2018
10:40
Scorecard

Adelaide Strikers; 7/172 (20 overs)	v	Brisbane Heat; 2/136 (20 overs)
Sophie Devine 89 (55); Jemma Barsby 2/23 (4 overs)		Beth Mooney 63* (57); Megan Schutt 1/23 (4 overs)

Adelaide Strikers won by 36 runs
CitiPower Centre, St Kilda
Umpires: Dale Ireland and Ben Treloar
Player of the match: Sophie Devine (Adelaide Strikers)

- Brisbane Heat won the toss and elected to field
- Broadcast by Seven Network and Fox Cricket

Match 7
8 December 2018
14:10
Scorecard

Adelaide Strikers; 7/153 (20.0 overs)	v	Melbourne Renegades; 4/154 (20.0 overs)
Suzie Bates 54 (44); Georgia Wareham 2/20 (4 overs)		Danielle Wyatt 62 (47); Amanda-Jade Wellington 3/27 (4 overs)

Melbourne Renegades won by 6 wickets (with 0 balls remaining)
CitiPower Centre, St Kilda
Umpires: Daryl Brigham and Mattis van Eck
Player of the match: Danielle Wyatt (Melbourne Renegades)

- Adelaide Strikers won the toss and elected to bat

Match 11
9 December 2018
14:10
Scorecard

Melbourne Renegades; 4/83 (14.3 overs)	v	Adelaide Strikers; 2/27 (4.3 overs)
Sophie Molineux 44* (37); Megan Schutt 2/9 (2 overs)		Sophie Devine 13 (9); Lea Tahuhu 1/1 (0.3 overs)

No result
Eastern Oval, Ballarat
Umpires: Dale Ireland and Greg Azzopardi

- Adelaide Strikers won the toss and elected to field
- Melbourne Renegades' innings reduced to 14.3 overs due to rain delay
- Adelaide Strikers' target revised to 78 runs from 11 overs
- Match abandoned due to further rain delays

Match 14
15 December 2018
14:20
Scorecard

Adelaide Strikers; 132 (20 overs)	v	Sydney Thunder; 4/134 (17.3 overs)
Suzie Bates 79* (60); Rene Farrell 3/12 (4 overs)		Rachel Priest 58* (46); Samantha Betts 1/18 (2 overs)

Sydney Thunder won by 6 wickets (with 15 balls remaining)
Blundstone Arena, Hobart
Umpires: Darren Close and Michael Graham-Smith
Player of the match: Suzie Bates (Adelaide Strikers)

- Sydney Thunder won the toss and elected to field
- Broadcast by Seven Network and Fox Cricket

Match 17
16 December 2018
10:10
Scorecard

Adelaide Strikers; 5/145 (20 overs)	v	Sydney Thunder; 5/146 (18.2 overs)
Bridget Patterson 36* (40); Stafanie Taylor 2/33 (4 overs)		Stafanie Taylor 55 (42); Danielle Hazell 1/20 (3 overs)

Sydney Thunder won by 5 wickets (with 10 balls remaining)
Blundstone Arena, Hobart
Umpires: Wade Stewart and Harvey Wolff
Player of the match: Stafanie Taylor (Sydney Thunder)

- Sydney Thunder won the toss and elected to field

Match 23
21 December 2018
16:00
Scorecard

Adelaide Strikers; 7/144 (20 overs)	v	Melbourne Stars; 6/145 (19.3 overs)
Sophie Devine 46 (36); Erin Osborne 2/16 (4 overs)		Erin Osborne 54* (45); Danielle Hazell 2/27 (2.3 overs)

Melbourne Stars won by 4 wickets (with 3 balls remaining)
Karen Rolton Oval, Adelaide
Umpires: Harry Singh and Eloise Sheridan
Player of the match: Erin Osborne (Melbourne Stars)

- Melbourne Stars won the toss and elected to field

Match 26
23 December
13:20
Scorecard

Adelaide Strikers; 3/172 (20 overs)	v	Melbourne Stars; 9/153 (20 overs)
Sophie Devine 95 (60); Annabel Sutherland 1/17 (3 overs)		Mignon du Preez 33 (27); Sophie Devine 5/41 (4 overs)

Adelaide Strikers won by 19 runs
Adelaide Oval, Adelaide
Umpires: Claire Polosak and Eloise Sheridan
Player of the match: Sophie Devine (Adelaide Strikers)

- Melbourne Stars won the toss and elected to field
- Broadcast by Seven Network and Fox Cricket

Match 32
28 December
14:10
Scorecard

Sydney Sixers; 1/206 (20 overs)	v	Adelaide Strikers; 132 (19.1 overs)
Alyssa Healy 112* (69); Tahlia McGrath 0/19 (2 overs)		Suzie Bates 46 (36); Lauren Cheatle 3/22 (4 overs)

Sydney Sixers won by 74 runs
Hurstville Oval, Sydney
Umpires: T Penman and Ryan Nelson
Player of the match: Alyssa Healy (Sydney Sixers)

- Adelaide Strikers won the toss and elected to field

Match 38
31 December
13:20
Scorecard

Sydney Sixers; 4/147 (20 overs)	v	Adelaide Strikers; 8/139 (20 overs)
Ashleigh Gardner 49 (38); Amanda-Jade Wellington 2/19 (4 overs)		Suzie Bates 60 (58); Dane van Niekerk 2/12 (4 overs)

Sydney Sixers won by 8 runs
Adelaide Oval, Adelaide
Umpires: Claire Polosak and Eloise Sheridan
Player of the match: Dane van Niekerk (Sydney Sixers)

- Sydney Sixers won the toss and elected to bat
- Broadcast by Seven Network and Fox Cricket

Match 43
5 January
18:15
Scorecard

Brisbane Heat; 7/160 (20 overs)	v	Adelaide Strikers; 7/117 (20 overs)
Josephine Dooley 48* (33); Sophie Devine 2/15 (2 overs)		Sophie Devine 39 (37); Delissa Kimmince 3/21 (3 overs)

Brisbane Heat won by 43 runs
Harrup Park, Mackay
Attendance: 5,650
Umpires: Steven Farrell and David Taylor
Player of the match: Josephine Dooley (Brisbane Heat)

- Adelaide Strikers won the toss and elected to field
- The crowd of 5,650 set a new record for highest attendance at a standalone WBBL match

Match 48
8 January
13:40
Scorecard

Adelaide Strikers; 5/189 (20 overs)	v	Hobart Hurricanes; 8/189 (20 overs)
Sophie Devine 99* (53); Brooke Hepburn 2/28 (4 overs)		Georgia Redmayne 54* (37); Sarah Coyte 3/32 (4 overs)

Match tied (Adelaide Strikers won the one over eliminator)
Karen Rolton Oval, Adelaide
Umpires: Harry Singh and Craig Thomas
Player of the match: Sophie Devine (Adelaide Strikers)

- Hobart Hurricanes won the toss and elected to field

Match 49
9 January
13:40
Scorecard

Adelaide Strikers; 5/165 (20 overs)	v	Hobart Hurricanes; 9/141 (20 overs)
Tahlia McGrath 65 (39); Heather Knight 2/31 (4 overs)		Heather Knight 55 (39); Megan Schutt 3/21 (4 overs)

Adelaide Strikers won by 24 runs
Karen Rolton Oval, Adelaide
Umpires: Craig Thomas and Eloise Sheridan
Player of the match: Tahlia McGrath (Adelaide Strikers)

- Adelaide Strikers won the toss and elected to bat

Match 51
12 January
10:50
Scorecard

Adelaide Strikers; 7/138 (20 overs)	v	Perth Scorchers; 108 (18.3 overs)
Sophie Devine 59 (48); Heather Graham 2/25 (4 overs)		Lauren Ebsary 38 (30); Danielle Hazell 3/20 (4 overs)

Adelaide Strikers won by 30 runs
Albrecht Oval, Alice Springs
Umpires: Harry Singh and Craig Thomas
Player of the match: Sophie Devine (Adelaide Strikers)

- Adelaide Strikers won the toss and elected to bat
- Venue changed to Albrecht Oval due to an unsafe outfield at Traeger Park

Match 54
13 January
10:50
Scorecard

Adelaide Strikers; 6/140 (20 overs)	v	Perth Scorchers; 0/144 (16.4 overs)
Suzie Bates 39 (35); Emma King 2/19 (4 overs)		Meg Lanning 70* (48); Sophie Devine 0/18 (3 overs)

Perth Scorchers won by 10 wickets (with 20 balls remaining)
Albrecht Oval, Alice Springs
Umpires: Harry Singh and Craig Thomas
Player of the match: Amy Jones (Perth Scorchers)

- Adelaide Strikers won the toss and elected to bat
- Venue changed to Albrecht Oval due to an unsafe outfield at Traeger Park
- Former Australian player Lauren Ebsary made her last WBBL appearance

== Statistics and awards ==
- Most runs: Sophie Devine – 556 (2nd in the league)
- Highest score in an innings: Sophie Devine – 99* (53) vs Hobart Hurricanes, 8 January 2019
- Most wickets: Sophie Devine – 14 (equal 14th in the league)
- Best bowling figures in an innings: Sophie Devine – 5/41 (4 overs) vs Melbourne Stars, 23 December 2018
- Most catches (fielder): Suzie Bates – 7 (equal 9th in the league)
- Player of the Match awards:
  - Sophie Devine – 4
  - Suzie Bates, Tahlia McGrath – 1 each
- Strikers Most Valuable Player: Sophie Devine
- WBBL|04 Player of the Tournament: Sophie Devine (2nd)
- WBBL|04 Team of the Tournament: Sophie Devine
