= Australia women's cricket team in Sri Lanka in 2026–27 =

International cricket tour

| | Sri Lanka | Australia |
- Dates: 15 – 20 December 2026
| Captains | | Sophie Molineux |

One Day International series

The Australia women's cricket team are scheduled to tour Sri Lanka in December 2026 to play three One Day International (ODI) matches against Sri Lanka women's cricket team. The ODI series will form part of the 2025–2029 ICC Women's Championship cycle. In September 2026, Sri Lanka Cricket (SLC) and Cricket Australia (CA) confirmed the fixtures for the tour.

== Squads ==
| Sri Lanka | Australia |
|---|---|
| | Sophie Molineux (c); Ashleigh Gardner (vc); Tahlia McGrath (vc); Kim Garth; Lucy Hamilton; Alana King; Charli Knott; Anika Learoyd; Phoebe Litchfield; Beth Mooney (wk); Ellyse Perry; Megan Schutt; Georgia Voll; Georgia Wareham |

== ODI series ==
=== 1st ODI ===
15 December 2026
[Scorecard]

| Sri Lanka | v | Australia |

Rangiri Dambulla International Stadium, Dambulla

=== 2nd ODI ===
18 December 2026
[Scorecard]

| Sri Lanka | v | Australia |

Rangiri Dambulla International Stadium, Dambulla

=== 3rd ODI ===
20 December 2026
[Scorecard]

| Sri Lanka | v | Australia |

Rangiri Dambulla International Stadium, Dambulla
