= Pakistan women's cricket team in Australia in 2022–23 =

International cricket tour

	Australia	Pakistan
- Dates: 16 – 29 January 2023
Captains	Meg Lanning	Bismah Maroof

One Day International series
- Results: Australia won the 3-match series 3–0
Most runs	Beth Mooney (191)	Nida Dar (112)
Most wickets	Darcie Brown (5); Ashleigh Gardner (5)	Diana Baig (3); Fatima Sana (3)
- Player of the series: Beth Mooney (Aus)

Twenty20 International series
- Results: Australia won the 3-match series 2–0
Most runs	Ellyse Perry (57)	Muneeba Ali (41)
Most wickets	Megan Schutt (5)	Nida Dar (3)
- Player of the series: Alana King (Aus)

The Pakistan women's national cricket team toured Australia in January 2023 to play three Women's One Day Internationals (WODIs) and three Women's Twenty20 Internationals (WT20Is). The WODI matches formed part of the 2022–2025 ICC Women's Championship.

== Squads ==
WODIs		WT20Is	
Australia	Pakistan	Australia	Pakistan
Meg Lanning (c); Tahlia McGrath (vc); Darcie Brown; Nicola Carey; Ashleigh Gardner; Kim Garth; Jess Jonassen; Alana King; Phoebe Litchfield; Beth Mooney (wk); Ellyse Perry; Megan Schutt; Annabel Sutherland	Bismah Maroof (c); Muneeba Ali (wk); Sidra Ameen; Diana Baig; Nida Dar; Ghulam Fatima; Tuba Hassan; Sadia Iqbal; Kainat Imtiaz; Ayesha Naseem; Sidra Nawaz (wk); Aliya Riaz; Nashra Sandhu; Fatima Sana; Sadaf Shamas; Omaima Sohail	Meg Lanning (c); ~~Alyssa Healy (vc)~~; Darcie Brown; Ashleigh Gardner; Kim Garth; Heather Graham; Grace Harris; Jess Jonassen; Alana King; Tahlia McGrath; Beth Mooney (wk); Ellyse Perry; Megan Schutt; Annabel Sutherland; Georgia Wareham	Bismah Maroof (c); Muneeba Ali (wk); Sidra Ameen; Aiman Anwer; ~~Diana Baig~~; Nida Dar; Tuba Hassan; Sadia Iqbal; Javeria Khan; Ayesha Naseem; Sidra Nawaz (wk); Aliya Riaz; Fatima Sana; Nashra Sandhu; Sadaf Shamas; Omaima Sohail

Aimen Anwar, Javeria Khan and Tuba Hassan were named as travelling reserves for Pakistan's WODI squad, whilst Ghulam Fatima, Kainat Imtiaz and Sadaf Shamas were named as travelling reserves in the WT20I squad. On 13 January, injured Alyssa Healy was ruled out of the WT20I series. On 21 January, Pakistan's Diana Baig was ruled out of the WT20I series due to a fractured finger, with Sadaf Shamas added to the squad.

== Tour match ==
13 January 2023
10:05
Scorecard

Governor General's XI; 235 (49.3 overs)	v	Pakistan; 182 (44.4 overs)
Erin Burns 74 (92); Nida Dar 4/46 (10 overs)		Bismah Maroof 74 (103); Amanda-Jade Wellington 4/33 (10 overs)

Governor General's XI won by 53 runs
Allan Border Field, Brisbane
Umpires: Claire Polosak (Aus) and Eloise Sheridan (Aus)
Player of the match: Erin Burns (GXI)

- Pakistan won the toss and elected to field.

== WODI series ==
=== 1st WODI ===
16 January 2023
10:05
Scorecard

Pakistan; 8/160 (40 overs)	v	Australia; 2/158 (28.5 overs)
Nida Dar 59 (88); Darcie Brown 2/21 (4 overs)		Phoebe Litchfield 78* (92); Diana Baig 1/21 (6 overs)

Australia won by 8 wickets (DLS method)
Allan Border Field, Brisbane
Umpires: Claire Polosak (Aus) and Eloise Sheridan (Aus)
Player of the match: Phoebe Litchfield (Aus)

- Australia won the toss and elected to field.
- Australia were set a revised target of 158 runs in 40 overs due to rain.
- Phoebe Litchfield (Aus) made her WODI debut.
- Women's Championship points: Australia 2, Pakistan 0.

=== 2nd WODI ===
18 January 2023
10:05
Scorecard

Pakistan; 125 (43 overs)	v	Australia; 0/129 (19.2 overs)
Nida Dar 24 (38); Darcie Brown 3/32 (8 overs)		Phoebe Litchfield 67* (61)

Australia won by 10 wickets
Allan Border Field, Brisbane
Umpires: Shawn Craig (Aus) and Michael Graham-Smith (Aus)
Player of the match: Darcie Brown (Aus)

- Pakistan won the toss and elected to bat.
- Kim Garth also made her WODI debut for Australia after previously playing 34 WODIs for Ireland.
- Women's Championship points: Australia 2, Pakistan 0.

=== 3rd WODI ===
21 January 2023
11:05
Scorecard

Australia; 9/336 (50 overs)	v	Pakistan; 7/235 (50 overs)
Beth Mooney 133 (105); Fatima Sana 3/53 (10 overs)		Bismah Maroof 44 (71); Ashleigh Gardner 3/30 (10 overs)

Australia won by 101 runs
North Sydney Oval, Sydney
Umpires: Claire Polosak (Aus) and Michael Graham-Smith (Aus)
Player of the match: Beth Mooney (Aus)

- Pakistan won the toss and elected to field.
- Tuba Hassan (Pak) made her WODI debut.
- Meg Lanning (Aus) played in her last WODI match.
- Women's Championship points: Australia 2, Pakistan 0.

== WT20I series ==
=== 1st WT20I ===
24 January 2023
13:45
Scorecard

Pakistan; 118 (20 overs)	v	Australia; 2/119 (13.4 overs)
Omaima Sohail 30 (36); Megan Schutt 5/15 (4 overs)		Ellyse Perry 57* (40); Nida Dar 1/17 (2 overs)

Australia won by 8 wickets
North Sydney Oval, Sydney
Umpires: Eloise Sheridan (Aus) and Shawn Craig (Aus)
Player of the match: Megan Schutt (Aus)

- Pakistan won the toss and elected to bat.
- Sadaf Shamas (Pak) made her WT20I debut.

=== 2nd WT20I ===
26 January 2023
19:05 (N)
Scorecard

Pakistan; 7/96 (20 overs)	v	Australia; 2/100 (12.4 overs)
Muneeba Ali 33 (43); Alana King 2/10 (2 overs)		Beth Mooney 46 (29); Nida Dar 2/27 (4 overs)

Australia won by 8 wickets
Bellerive Oval, Hobart
Umpires: Michael Graham-Smith (Aus) and Claire Polosak (Aus)
Player of the match: Beth Mooney (Aus)

- Pakistan won the toss and elected to bat.

=== 3rd WT20I ===
29 January 2023
13:45
Scorecard

Australia	v	Pakistan

Match abandoned
Manuka Oval, Canberra
Umpires: Claire Polosak (Aus) and Shawn Craig (Aus)

- No toss.
- No play was possible due to rain.
