= New Zealand women's cricket team in Australia in 2020–21 =

International cricket tour

	Australia women	New Zealand women
- Dates: 26 September – 7 October 2020
Captains	Meg Lanning (Note: Rachael Haynes captained Australia Women for the third WODI.)	Sophie Devine

One Day International series
- Results: Australia women won the 3-match series 3–0
Most runs	Rachael Haynes (222)	Amy Satterthwaite (111)
Most wickets	Jess Jonassen (8)	Amelia Kerr (6)
- Player of the series: Rachael Haynes (Aus)

Twenty20 International series
- Results: Australia women won the 3-match series 2–1
Most runs	Ashleigh Gardner (90)	Amy Satterthwaite (69)
Most wickets	Delissa Kimmince (6)	Sophie Devine (4)
- Player of the series: Ashleigh Gardner (Aus)

The New Zealand women's cricket team played against Australia women's cricket team in September 2020 and October 2020. The tour consisted of three Women's One Day Internationals (WODIs) and three Women's Twenty20 Internationals (WT20Is). On 21 August 2020, Cricket Australia named a 18-member combined squad for the fixtures. New Zealand Cricket confirmed their squad one week later, with their former captain Amy Satterthwaite returning to the side.

Originally, the WT20I matches were scheduled to be played in Sydney, with the WODI matches taking place in Queensland. However, due to the COVID-19 pandemic, a revised schedule was issued, with all the matches taking place at Allan Border Field in Brisbane, using biosecure protocols. The New Zealand team departed for the tour on 9 September 2020.

Australia won the first two WT20I matches to take an unassailable series lead. It was also Australia's tenth consecutive bilateral series win against all teams in the format. New Zealand won the final WT20I match by five wickets, with Australia taking the series 2–1. It was New Zealand's first win in thirteen matches across all formats against Australia. Australia also won the first two WODI matches to win the series, with their captain Meg Lanning scoring her 14th century in the format in the second match. Australia won the third WODI to win the series 3–0, equalling the winning streak in ODIs of 21 matches, set by Ricky Ponting's team of 2002–03.

== Squads ==
WODIs		WT20Is	
Australia	New Zealand	Australia	New Zealand
Meg Lanning (c); Rachael Haynes (vc); Maitlan Brown; Erin Burns; Nicola Carey; Ashleigh Gardner; Alyssa Healy; Jess Jonassen; Delissa Kimmince; Tahlia McGrath; Sophie Molineux; Beth Mooney; ~~Ellyse Perry~~; Megan Schutt; Molly Strano; Annabel Sutherland; Belinda Vakarewa; Georgia Wareham	Sophie Devine (c); Suzie Bates; Natalie Dodd; Deanna Doughty; Lauren Down; Maddy Green; Holly Huddleston; Hayley Jensen; Amelia Kerr; Jess Kerr; Rosemary Mair; Katey Martin; Katie Perkins; Hannah Rowe; Amy Satterthwaite; Lea Tahuhu; Jess Watkin	Meg Lanning (c); Rachael Haynes (vc); Maitlan Brown; Erin Burns; Nicola Carey; Ashleigh Gardner; Alyssa Healy; Jess Jonassen; Delissa Kimmince; Tahlia McGrath; Sophie Molineux; Beth Mooney; ~~Ellyse Perry~~; Megan Schutt; Molly Strano; Annabel Sutherland; Belinda Vakarewa; Georgia Wareham	Sophie Devine (c); Suzie Bates; Natalie Dodd; Deanna Doughty; Lauren Down; Maddy Green; Holly Huddleston; Hayley Jensen; Amelia Kerr; Jess Kerr; Rosemary Mair; Katey Martin; Katie Perkins; Hannah Rowe; Amy Satterthwaite; Lea Tahuhu; Jess Watkin

Australia's Ellyse Perry was initially ruled out of the first game of the three-match T20I series, due to hamstring injury she suffered during the 2020 ICC Women's T20 World Cup. On 29 September 2020, Cricket Australia confirmed that Perry had been ruled out of the series due to her ongoing injury. New Zealand's Suzie Bates was ruled out of the final two WODI matches, due to shoulder injury.

== Practice match ==
Prior to the international matches, the teams played a one-off 40 over warm-up, with Australia Women winning by 11 runs. Following the match, the teams also played a practice Super Over, with New Zealand Women winning by five runs.

24 September 2020
Scorecard

Australia; 8/247 (40 overs)	v	New Zealand; 236 (38.1 overs)
Beth Mooney 80 (86); Holly Huddleston 2/23 (5 overs)		Sophie Devine 89 (73); Sophie Molineux 5/29 (7 overs)

Australia Women won by 11 runs
Allan Border Field, Brisbane

== WT20I series ==
=== 1st WT20I ===
26 September 2020
13:50
Scorecard

Australia; 6/138 (20 overs)	v	New Zealand; 7/121 (20 overs)
Ashleigh Gardner 61 (41); Sophie Devine 3/18 (4 overs)		Suzie Bates 33 (38); Megan Schutt 4/23 (4 overs)

Australia Women won by 17 runs
Allan Border Field, Brisbane
Umpires: Donovan Koch (Aus) and Bruce Oxenford (Aus)
Player of the match: Ashleigh Gardner (Aus)

- New Zealand Women won the toss and elected to field.
- Amy Satterthwaite (NZ) played in her 100th WT20I.
- Suzie Bates (NZ) took her 50th wicket in WT20Is.

=== 2nd WT20I ===
27 September 2020
13:45
Scorecard

New Zealand; 128 (19.2 overs)	v	Australia; 2/129 (16.4 overs)
Amy Satterthwaite 30 (25); Delissa Kimmince 3/21 (3 overs)		Rachael Haynes 40* (31); Amelia Kerr 1/19 (3 overs)

Australia Women won by 8 wickets
Allan Border Field, Brisbane
Umpires: Michael Graham-Smith (Aus) and Bruce Oxenford (Aus)
Player of the match: Sophie Molineux (Aus)

- New Zealand Women won the toss and elected to bat.
- Alyssa Healy (Aus) took her 92nd dismissal as a wicket-keeper, the most by any cricketer, male or female, in T20I cricket.
- Alyssa Healy (Aus) also became the second wicket-keeper to make 50 stumpings in WT20Is.

=== 3rd WT20I ===
30 September 2020
13:45
Scorecard

Australia; 7/123 (20 overs)	v	New Zealand; 5/125 (19.3 overs)
Ashleigh Gardner 29 (21); Amelia Kerr 2/18 (4 overs)		Amy Satterthwaite 30 (25); Georgia Wareham 2/19 (3 overs)

New Zealand Women won by 5 wickets
Allan Border Field, Brisbane
Umpires: Michael Graham-Smith (Aus) and Donovan Koch (Aus)
Player of the match: Amelia Kerr (NZ)

- New Zealand Women won the toss and elected to field.

== WODI series ==
=== 1st WODI ===
3 October 2020
10:10
Scorecard

New Zealand; 180 (49.1 overs)	v	Australia; 3/181 (33.4 overs)
Maddy Green 35 (49); Georgia Wareham 2/23 (10 overs)		Meg Lanning 62* (70); Rosemary Mair 2/21 (7 overs)

Australia Women won by 7 wickets
Allan Border Field, Brisbane
Umpires: Michael Graham-Smith (Aus) and Bruce Oxenford (Aus)
Player of the match: Georgia Wareham (Aus)

- Australia Women won the toss and elected to field.
- Annabel Sutherland (Aus) made her WODI debut.
- Meg Lanning (Aus) scored her 1,000th run in WODIs against New Zealand.

=== 2nd WODI ===
5 October 2020
10:10
Scorecard

New Zealand; 9/252 (50 overs)	v	Australia; 6/255 (45.1 overs)
Sophie Devine 79 (115); Jess Jonassen 4/36 (10 overs)		Meg Lanning 101* (96); Amelia Kerr 3/47 (10 overs)

Australia Women won by 4 wickets
Allan Border Field, Brisbane
Umpires: Michael Graham-Smith (Aus) and Donovan Koch (Aus)
Player of the match: Meg Lanning (Aus)

- Australia Women won the toss and elected to field.

=== 3rd WODI ===
7 October 2020
10:10
Scorecard

Australia; 5/325 (50 overs)	v	New Zealand; 93 (27 overs)
Rachael Haynes 96 (104); Amelia Kerr 3/50 (10 overs)		Amy Satterthwaite 41 (49); Sophie Molineux 2/2 (2 overs)

Australia Women won by 232 runs
Allan Border Field, Brisbane
Umpires: Donovan Koch (Aus) and Bruce Oxenford (Aus)
Player of the match: Rachael Haynes (Aus)

- New Zealand Women won the toss and elected to field.
- In terms of runs, this was Australia's biggest win against New Zealand in WODIs.
