= New Zealand women's cricket team in Australia in 2016–17 =

International cricket tour

	Australia Women	New Zealand women
- Dates: 17 – 22 February 2017
Captains	Meg Lanning	Suzie Bates

Twenty20 International series
- Results: New Zealand women won the 3-match series 2–1
Most runs	Elyse Villani (92)	Suzie Bates (87)
Most wickets	Amanda-Jade Wellington (9)	Anna Peterson (4); Holly Huddleston (4)
- Player of the series: Suzie Bates (NZ)

The New Zealand women cricket team toured Australia in February 2017. The tour consisted of a series of three Women's Twenty20 International (WT20Is). Immediately after completion of the T20 series both teams faced each other for the Rose bowl in New Zealand in a 3-match WODI series. New Zealand Women won the WT20I series by 2–1.

== Squads ==
Australia	New Zealand
Meg Lanning (c); Sarah Aley; Kristen Beams; Alex Blackwell; Lauren Cheatle; Rene Farrell; Ashleigh Gardner; Alyssa Healy; Jess Jonassen; Beth Mooney; Megan Schutt; Molly Strano; Elyse Villani; Amanda-Jade Wellington	Suzie Bates (c); Erin Bermingham; ~~Sophie Devine~~; Maddy Green; Holly Huddleston; ~~Leigh Kasperek~~; Amelia Kerr; Katey Martin; Thamsyn Newton; Katie Perkins; Anna Peterson; Liz Perry; Rachel Priest; Amy Satterthwaite; Lea Tahuhu

Ahead of the tour, Sophie Devine was ruled out of New Zealand's squad due to injury and was replaced by Anna Peterson. Sarah Aley was added to Australia's squad as cover for Lauren Cheatle. Leigh Kasperek was ruled out of the rest of the series after an injury in the first match. She was replaced by Amelia Kerr.

== WT20I series ==
=== 1st WT20I ===
17 February 2017
Scorecard

Australia; 4/151 (20 overs)	v	New Zealand; 8/111 (20 overs)
Elyse Villani 73* (47); Lea Tahuhu 1/22 (4 overs)		Amy Satterthwaite 40* (38); Amanda-Jade Wellington 3/15 (4 overs)

Australia Women won by 40 runs
Melbourne Cricket Ground, Melbourne
Umpires: Gerard Abood (Aus) and Shawn Craig (Aus)
Player of the match: Elyse Villani (Aus)

- New Zealand Women won the toss and elected to field.
- Ashleigh Gardner, Molly Strano and Amanda-Jade Wellington (Aus) all made their WT20I debuts.

=== 2nd WT20I ===
19 February 2017
Scorecard

New Zealand; 9/101 (20 overs)	v	Australia; 9/61 (13 overs)
Suzie Bates 30 (34); Molly Strano 5/10 (4 overs)		Elyse Villani 19 (17); Anna Peterson 3/2 (1 overs)

New Zealand Women won by 8 runs (DLS method)
Kardinia Park, Geelong
Umpires: Shawn Craig (Aus) and John Ward (Aus)
Player of the match: Anna Peterson (NZ)

- Australia Women won the toss and elected to field.
- Australia Women were set a target of 70 runs from 13 overs.
- Anna Peterson (NZ) took a hat-trick.
- Molly Strano took maiden five wicket haul in a WT20I and claimed 5 for 10, the best figures by an Australian in a WT20I.

=== 3rd WT20I ===
22 February 2017
Scorecard

New Zealand; 113/8 (20 overs)	v	Australia; 66 (16 overs)
Suzie Bates 31 (34); Amanda-Jade Wellington 4/16 (4 overs)		Alex Blackwell 30* (34); Holly Huddleston 2/9 (4 overs)

New Zealand Women won by 47 runs
Adelaide Oval, Adelaide
Umpires: Gerard Abood (Aus) and John Ward
Player of the match: Suzie Bates (NZ)

- New Zealand Women won the toss and elected to bat.
- Australia's score of 66 all out was their lowest total in a T20I.
