= Australia women's cricket team in New Zealand in 2016–17 =

Australian women's cricket team in New Zealand in 2016–17
	New Zealand Women	Australia women
- Dates: 26 February – 5 March 2017
Captains	Suzie Bates	Meg Lanning

One Day International series
- Results: Australia women won the 3-match series 2–1
Most runs	Amy Satterthwaite (198)	Beth Mooney (226)
Most wickets	Holly Huddleston (7)	Amanda-Jade Wellington (6)

The Australia women's national cricket team toured New Zealand in the last week of February 2017. The tour took place immediately after the completion of the Australia-New Zealand WT20I series in Australia. The two teams competed in a series of three Women's One Day International cricket (WODIs) for the Rose Bowl. Australia women won the series 2–1.

== Squads ==
New Zealand	Australia
Suzie Bates (c); Erin Bermingham; Samantha Curtis; ~~Sophie Devine~~; ~~Maddy Green~~; Holly Huddleston; ~~Leigh Kasperek~~; Amelia Kerr; Katey Martin; Thamsyn Newton; Katie Perkins; Liz Perry; Rachel Priest; Amy Satterthwaite; Lea Tahuhu	Meg Lanning (c); Kristen Beams; Alex Blackwell; Nicole Bolton; Lauren Cheatle; Rene Farrell; Ashleigh Gardner; Rachael Haynes; Alyssa Healy; Jess Jonassen; Beth Mooney; Ellyse Perry; Megan Schutt; Elyse Villani; Amanda-Jade Wellington

Ahead of the tour, Sophie Devine was ruled out of New Zealand's squad due to injury and was replaced by Samantha Curtis. Leigh Kasperek was ruled out of the series after an injury in the first Women's Twenty20 International match against Australia in Australia earlier in the month. She was replaced by Amelia Kerr. Maddy Green was also ruled out of the New Zealand squad due to injury. Meanwhile, Rachael Haynes was added to Australia's squad as cover for Alex Blackwell, who has a minor hamstring strain, but is not expected to miss the series.

== WODI series ==
=== 1st WODI ===
26 February 2017
Scorecard

Australia; 275 (48.4 overs)	v	New Zealand; 276/5 (49.1 overs)
Beth Mooney 100 (123); Lea Tahuhu 4/59 (10 overs)		Amy Satterthwaite 102* (113); Amanda-Jade Wellington 2/51 (10 overs)

New Zealand Women won by 5 wickets
Eden Park No 2, Auckland
Umpires: Kathy Cross (NZ) and Garth Stirrat (NZ)
Player of the match: Amy Satterthwaite (NZ)

- Australia Women won the toss and elected to bat.
- Lauren Cheatle (Aus) made her WODI debut.
- Beth Mooney (Aus) scored her maiden WODI hundred.
- New Zealand completed their biggest run chase and second biggest chase overall in a WODI.
- Amy Satterthwaite (NZ) became the first player in WODIs to score four consecutive hundreds.

=== 2nd WODI ===
2 March 2017
Scorecard

New Zealand; 253/8 (50 overs)	v	Australia; 256/6 (47.2 overs)
Amy Satterthwaite 85 (117); Amanda-Jade Wellington 3/52 (10 overs)		Alex Blackwell 65 (74); Amelia Kerr 4/54 (10 overs)

Australia Women won by 4 wickets
Bay Oval, Mount Maunganui
Umpires: Richard Hooper (NZ) and Garth Stirrat (NZ)

- Australia Women won the toss and elected to field.
- Ashleigh Gardner (Aus) made her WODI debut.

=== 3rd WODI ===
5 March 2017
Scorecard

New Zealand; 270/9 (50 overs)	v	Australia; 273/5 (49.2 overs)
Katey Martin 77 (86); Jess Jonassen 3/47 (10 overs)		Meg Lanning 104* (116); Holly Huddleston 3/44 (10 overs)

Australia Women won by 5 wickets
Bay Oval, Mount Maunganui
Umpires: Kathy Cross (NZ) and Richard Hooper (NZ)
Player of the match: Meg Lanning (Aus)

- Australia Women won the toss and elected to field.
- Meg Lanning (Aus) scored the most hundreds in WODIs (10).
