= 2017–18 Women's Ashes series =

International cricket tour

English women's cricket team in Australia in 2017–18
	Australia	England
- Dates: 22 October – 21 November 2017
Captains	Rachael Haynes	Heather Knight

Test series
- Result: 1-match series drawn 0–0
Most runs	Ellyse Perry (213)	Heather Knight (141)
Most wickets	Tahlia McGrath (3); Ellyse Perry (3)	Sophie Ecclestone (3); Laura Marsh (3)

One Day International series
- Results: Australia won the 3-match series 2–1
Most runs	Alyssa Healy (145)	Heather Knight (139)
Most wickets	Megan Schutt (10)	Alex Hartley (6)

Twenty20 International series
- Results: England won the 3-match series 2–1
Most runs	Beth Mooney (220)	Danni Wyatt (169)
Most wickets	Megan Schutt (6)	Jenny Gunn (4); Katherine Brunt (4); Sophie Ecclestone (4)
- Player of the series: Heather Knight (Eng)

Total Ashes points
- Australia 8, England 8

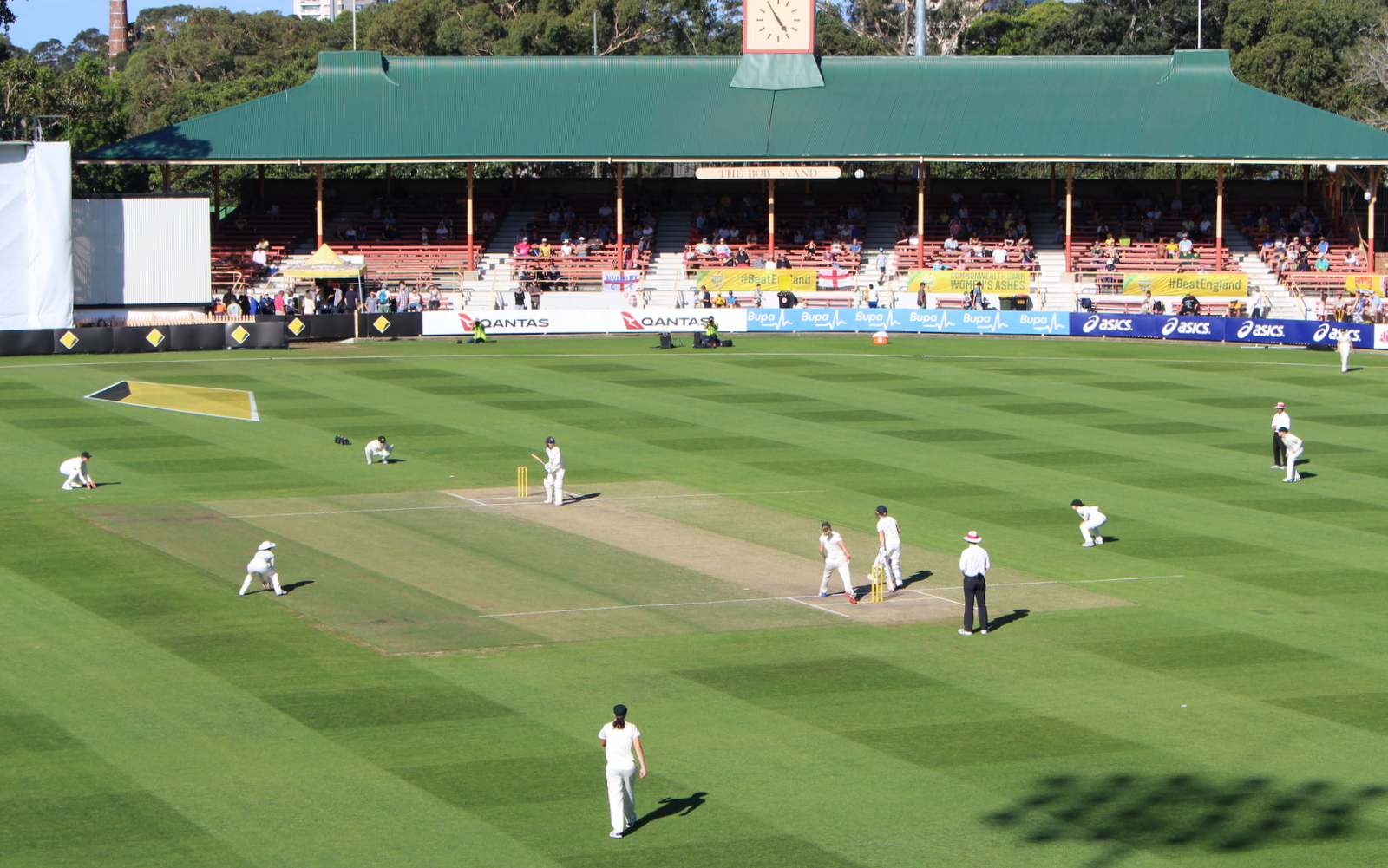
The Test match at North Sydney Oval

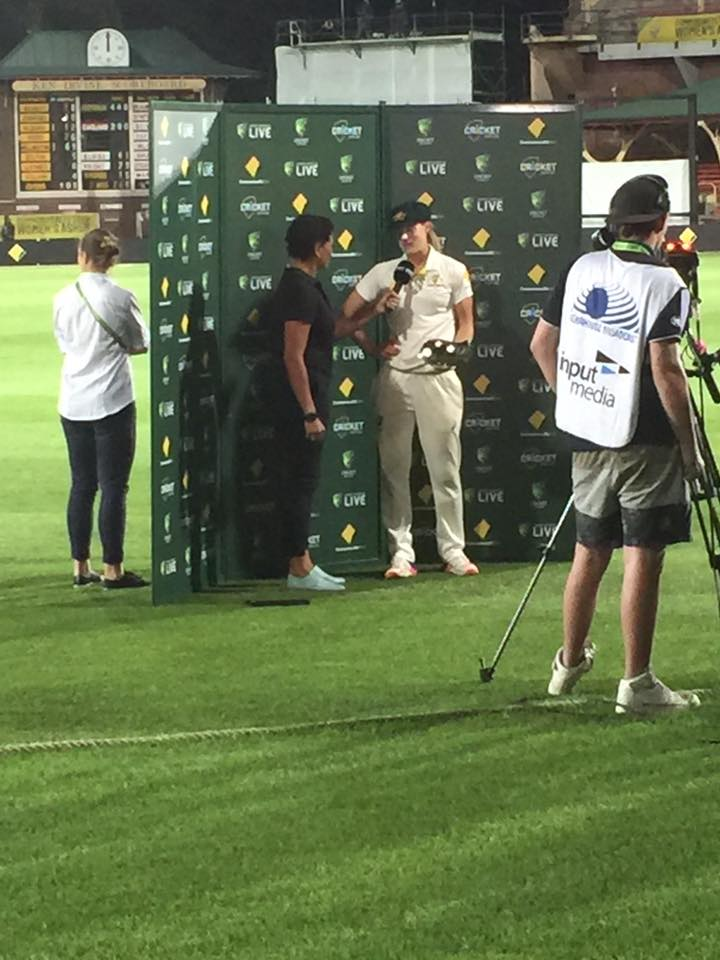
Ellyse Perry receiving her player of the match award from Mel Jones at the conclusion of the Test match at North Sydney Oval.

The England women's cricket team toured Australia in October and November 2017 to play the Australia women's national cricket team to contest the Women's Ashes. The teams played one Test match, three Women's One Day Internationals (WODIs) and three Women's Twenty20 Internationals (WT20Is). The Women's Ashes were held by Australia prior to the start of the series.

Since 2013, the series has consisted of a multi-format series with points awarded for each of the matches. Two points was awarded for each WODI or WT20I win, four points to the Test winner, or two points to each team in the event of the Test being a draw.

In August 2017, Australia's captain Meg Lanning announced that she would miss the series, after undergoing surgery on her shoulder. The following month, Rachael Haynes was named as her replacement. In September 2017, Cricket Australia confirmed that the first match, the WODI at Allan Border Field, Brisbane, had sold out, the first time a Women's Ashes fixture had done so.

The Test match was played as a day/night fixture, the first time a Women's Test has been played as such. The WODIs were part of the 2017–2020 ICC Women's Championship, with Australia winning the WODI series 2–1. The Test match ended as a draw, with Ellyse Perry of Australia scoring the first double century in a Women's Ashes Test. Australia Women retained the Ashes, after they won the first of the WT20I fixtures, leaving them with an unassailable lead. England Women went on to win the WT20I series 2–1, with the series tied 8–8 across all formats.

== Squads ==
Australia	England
Rachael Haynes (c); Sarah Aley; Kristen Beams; Alex Blackwell; Nicole Bolton; Lauren Cheatle; Ashleigh Gardner; Alyssa Healy (wk); Jess Jonassen; Delissa Kimmince; Tahlia McGrath; Beth Mooney; Ellyse Perry; Megan Schutt; Molly Strano; Belinda Vakarewa; Elyse Villani; Amanda-Jade Wellington	Heather Knight (c); Tammy Beaumont; Katherine Brunt; Kate Cross; Sophie Ecclestone; Georgia Elwiss; Natasha Farrant; Jenny Gunn; Alex Hartley; Danielle Hazell; Amy Jones; Laura Marsh; Anya Shrubsole; Nat Sciver; Sarah Taylor (wk); Fran Wilson; Lauren Winfield; Danni Wyatt

Ahead of the Test match, England added Kate Cross, Natasha Farrant and Amy Jones to their squad. Prior to the WT20I fixtures, Lauren Cheatle was ruled out of the matches with a back injury, while Sarah Aley, Delissa Kimmince and Molly Strano were all added to Australia's squad.

== WODI series ==
=== 1st WODI ===
ICC Women's Championship
22 October 2017
09:15
Scorecard

England; 9/228 (50 overs)	v	Australia; 8/231 (49.1 overs)
Lauren Winfield 48 (63); Ashleigh Gardner 3/47 (9 overs)		Alex Blackwell 67* (86); Alex Hartley 2/40 (10 overs)

Australia Women won by 2 wickets
Allan Border Field, Brisbane
Umpires: Shawn Craig (Aus) and Greg Davidson (Aus)
Player of the match: Alex Blackwell (Aus)

- Australia Women won the toss and elected to field.
- Alex Blackwell became the most capped WODI player for Australia with 142 matches.
- Ashes points: Australia Women 2, England Women 0.
- ICC Women's Championship points: Australia Women 2, England Women 0.

=== 2nd WODI ===
ICC Women's Championship
26 October 2017
14:40 (D/N)
Scorecard

Australia; 6/296 (50 overs)	v	England; 209 (42.2 overs)
Rachael Haynes 89* (56); Jenny Gunn 4/55 (10 overs)		Katherine Brunt 52 (54); Megan Schutt 4/26 (8 overs)

Australian Women won by 75 runs (DLS method)
Coffs Harbour International Stadium, Coffs Harbour
Umpires: Shawn Craig (Aus) and Claire Polosak (Aus)
Player of the match: Rachael Haynes (Aus)

- England Women won the toss and elected to field.
- Rain set England Women a revised total of 285 runs from 46 overs.
- Tahlia McGrath (Aus) took her maiden WODI wicket.
- Ashes points: Australia Women 2, England Women 0.
- ICC Women's Championship points: Australia Women 2, England Women 0.

=== 3rd WODI ===
ICC Women's Championship
29 October 2017
10:15
Scorecard

England; 8/284 (50 overs)	v	Australia; 9/257 (48 overs)
Heather Knight 89* (80); Megan Schutt 4/44 (10 overs)		Alyssa Healy 71 (72); Alex Hartley 3/45 (9 overs)

England Women won by 20 runs (DLS method)
Coffs Harbour International Stadium, Coffs Harbour
Umpires: Greg Davidson (Aus) and Claire Polosak (Aus)
Player of the match: Heather Knight (Eng)

- England Women won the toss and elected to bat.
- Rain set Australia Women a revised total of 278 runs from 48 overs.
- Alex Blackwell played in her 250th international match for Australia Women.
- England scored their highest innings total against Australia in a WODI match.
- Ashes points: England Women 2, Australia Women 0.
- ICC Women's Championship points: England Women 2, Australia Women 0.

== Three day match ==
=== Cricket Australia Women's XI vs England Women ===
3–5 November 2017 (D/N)
Scorecard

England	v	Cricket Australia Women's XI
231 (71 overs); Lauren Winfield 82 (161); Lauren Smith 3/18 (6 overs)		271 (93 overs); Naomi Stalenberg 114 (165); Katherine Brunt 4/37 (14 overs)
7/305d (96 overs); Sarah Taylor 85 (145); Nicola Carey 2/36 (12 overs)		7/182 (40 overs); Nicola Carey 52 (62); Heather Knight 3/12 (3 overs)

Match drawn
Blacktown ISP Oval, Sydney
Umpires: Nathan Johnstone (Aus) and David Shepard (Aus)

- England Women won the toss and elected to bat.

== Only WTest ==
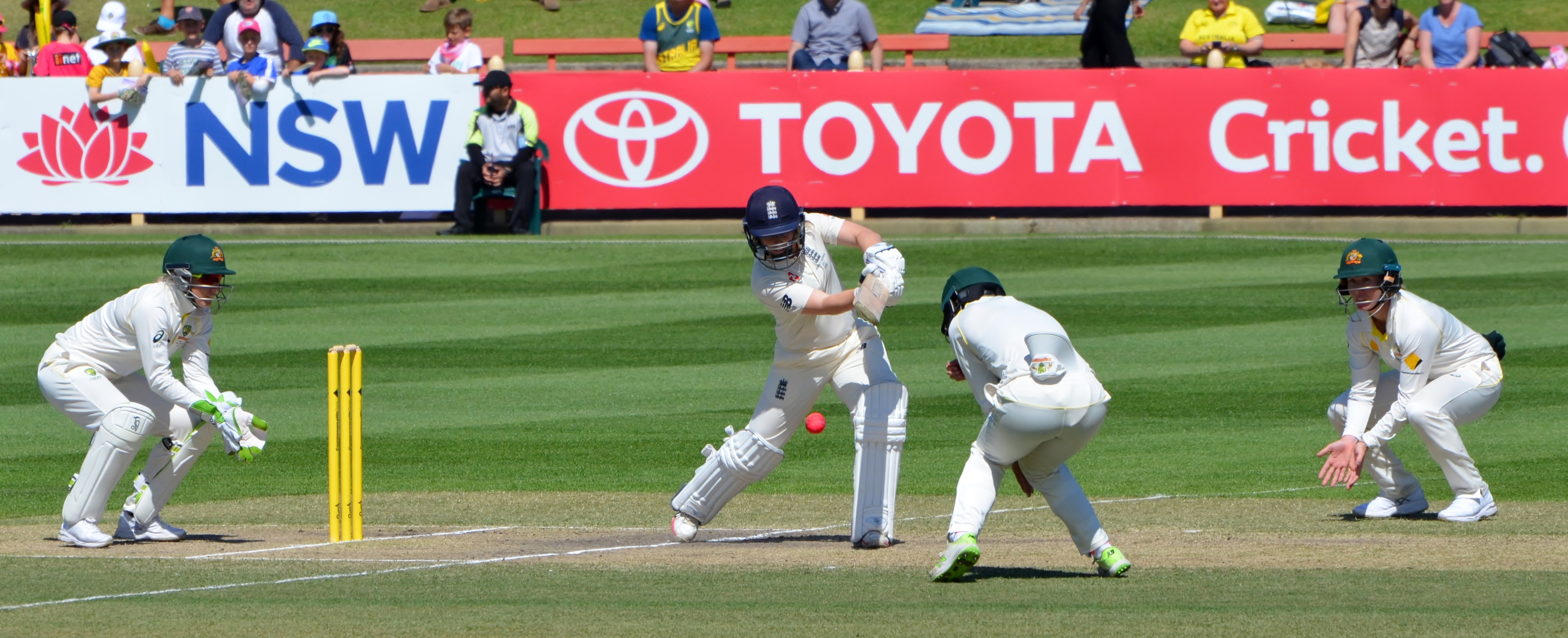
In action during the final day of the Test (L-R): Alyssa Healy, Tammy Beaumont, Elyse Villani and Beth Mooney

9–12 November 2017 (D/N)
Scorecard

England	v	Australia
280 (116 overs); Tammy Beaumont 70 (173); Ellyse Perry 3/59 (21 overs)		9/448d (166 overs); Ellyse Perry 213* (374); Sophie Ecclestone 3/107 (37 overs)
2/206 (105 overs); Heather Knight 79* (220); Tahlia McGrath 1/12 (11 overs)

Match drawn
North Sydney Oval, Sydney
Umpires: Gerard Abood (Aus) and Geoff Joshua (Aus)
Player of the match: Ellyse Perry (Aus)

- England Women won the toss and elected to bat.
- This was the first women's day/night Test match.
- Tahlia McGrath, Beth Mooney, Amanda-Jade Wellington (Aus), Sophie Ecclestone and Fran Wilson (Eng) all made their Test debuts.
- Ellyse Perry (Aus) scored her first century and the highest individual score for an Australian in Women's Tests.
- Ashes points: Australia Women 2, England Women 2.

== T20 tour match ==
=== Australia Governor-General's XI vs England Women ===
15 November 2017
18:30 (D/N)
Scorecard

England; 5/146 (20 overs)	v	Australia Governor-General's XI; 56 (15.5 overs)
Sarah Taylor 93* (76); Erin Fazackerley 2/13 (3 overs)		Naomi Stalenberg 20 (23); Jenny Gunn 2/4 (1.5 overs)

England Women won by 90 runs
Drummoyne Oval, Sydney
Umpires: Ben Treloar (Aus) and John Ward (Aus)

- England Women won the toss and elected to bat.
- 12 players per side (11 batting, 11 fielding).

== WT20I series ==
=== 1st WT20I ===
17 November 2017
19:10 (N)
Scorecard

England; 9/132 (20 overs)	v	Australia; 4/134 (15.5 overs)
Danni Wyatt 50 (36); Megan Schutt 4/22 (4 overs)		Beth Mooney 86* (54); Danielle Hazell 1/14 (3 overs)

Australia Women won by 6 wickets
North Sydney Oval, Sydney
Umpires: Shawn Craig (Aus) and Geoff Joshua (Aus)
Player of the match: Beth Mooney (Aus)

- Australia Women won the toss and elected to field.
- Sarah Aley (Aus) made her WT20I debut.
- Beth Mooney (Aus) scored the highest individual total by an Australian in a WT20I match in Australia.
- Ashes points: Australia Women 2, England Women 0.
- Australia Women retained the Ashes.

=== 2nd WT20I ===
19 November 2017
14:35
Scorecard

England; 6/152 (20 overs)	v	Australia; 112 (18 overs)
Nat Sciver 40 (32); Megan Schutt 2/16 (4 overs)		Alyssa Healy 24 (21); Jenny Gunn 4/13 (3 overs)

England Women won by 40 runs
Manuka Oval, Canberra
Umpires: Geoff Joshua (Aus) and John Ward (Aus)
Player of the match: Katherine Brunt (Eng)

- England Women won the toss and elected to bat.
- Ashes points: England Women 2, Australia Women 0.

=== 3rd WT20I ===
21 November 2017
19:10 (N)
Scorecard

Australia; 2/178 (20 overs)	v	England; 6/181 (19 overs)
Beth Mooney 117* (70); Katherine Brunt 1/25 (4 overs)		Danni Wyatt 100 (57); Jess Jonassen 2/25 (4 overs)

England Women won by 4 wickets
Manuka Oval, Canberra
Umpires: Shawn Craig (Aus) and John Ward (Aus)
Player of the match: Danni Wyatt (Eng)

- Australia Women won the toss and elected to bat.
- Beth Mooney (Aus) and Danni Wyatt (Eng) both scored their first centuries in a WT20I.
- Mooney also scored the second highest individual total in a WT20I match.
- This was the highest successful run chase and the highest aggregate total in a WT20I.
- Ashes points: England Women 2, Australia Women 0.
