= Wisden Leading Woman Cricketer in the World =

Annual cricket award

The Wisden Women's Leading Cricketer in the World is an annual cricket award selected by the editor of Wisden Cricketers' Almanack. It was established in 2015, to select the best female cricketer based upon their performances anywhere in the world in the previous calendar year. Prior to the establishment of this dedicated award, women were also eligible for inclusion in Wisden's Cricketers of the Year; two were selected, England's Claire Taylor in 2009 and Charlotte Edwards in 2014.

The inaugural recipient of the Wisden Leading Woman Cricketer in the World was Australian international cricketer Meg Lanning.

The most recent awardee is India's Deepti Sharma.

In the 2025 almanack Wisden compiled a retrospective list of the Leading Woman Cricketer in the World, 1973-2013.

== Winners ==
Year	Image	Winner	Nationality	Notes	Ref(s)
2014		Meg Lanning	Australia	T20I Women's Cricketer of the Year (2014); Youngest player to captain Australia	
2015		Suzie Bates	New Zealand	Player of the Tournament at the 2013 World Cup; T20I Women's Cricketer of the Year (2013); Captain of both the One Day International and Twenty20 International teams since 2012	
2016		Ellyse Perry	Australia		
2017		Mithali Raj	India	Test and ODI captain since 2005; World Cup finalist; highest runscorer in ODIs	
2018		Smriti Mandhana	India		
2019		Ellyse Perry	Australia		
2020		Beth Mooney	Australia	Player of the Tournament at T20 World Cup	
2021		Lizelle Lee	South Africa		
2022		Beth Mooney	Australia	Leading run-scorer and player of final at 2022 Commonwealth Games	
2023		Nat Sciver-Brunt	England		
2024		Smriti Mandhana	India		
2025		Deepti Sharma	India	Player of the Tournament at 2025 Women's Cricket World Cup	

== See also ==
- ICC Women's Cricketer of the Year
