= 2024–25 Women's Ashes series =

International cricket tour

	Australia	England
- Dates: 12 January – 2 February 2025
Captains	Alyssa Healy (Test & ODIs); Tahlia McGrath (T20Is)	Heather Knight
- Player of the series: Alana King (Australia)

Test series
- Result: Australia won the 1-match series 1–0
Most runs	Annabel Sutherland (163)	Nat Sciver-Brunt (69)
Most wickets	Alana King (9)	Sophie Ecclestone (5)

One Day International series
- Results: Australia won the 3-match series 3–0
Most runs	Ashleigh Gardner (146)	Nat Sciver-Brunt (115)
Most wickets	Alana King (11)	Sophie Ecclestone (7)

Twenty20 International series
- Results: Australia won the 3-match series 3–0
Most runs	Beth Mooney (213)	Heather Knight (101)
Most wickets	Georgia Wareham (6)	Charlie Dean (4); Sophie Ecclestone (4)

Ashes series points
- Australia 16, England 0

The England women's cricket team toured Australia in January and February 2025 to play the Australia women's cricket team in The Women's Ashes. The tour consisted of one Test match, three One Day International (ODI) and three Twenty20 International (T20I) matches. In March 2024, the Cricket Australia (CA) confirmed the fixtures for the series, as a part of Australia's 2024–25 home international season.

Australia had been the holders of the Ashes prior to the series and retained them after taking an unassailable 8–0 lead after their win in the 1st WT20I, before winning the series after winning the 2nd WT20I. Australia eventually won the series 16–0, winning every match.

== Background ==
The Ashes series was played in a separate season to the men's edition for the first time since the points-based system came into use. The series was held in a points system, where four points were awarded for a Test win, two points if it is drawn and two points for each win in the limited-overs matches. The four-day Test match was played as a day/night match at the Melbourne Cricket Ground (MCG) to mark the 90th anniversary of the first women's Test series. It was the first-ever day/night Test match at the MCG. It was also the first women's Test played at the MCG since 1949, and the second day-night Test between Australia and England.

== Squads ==
Australia			England		
Test	ODIs	T20Is	Test	ODIs	T20Is
Alyssa Healy (c); Tahlia McGrath (vc); Darcie Brown; Ashleigh Gardner; Kim Garth; Alana King; Phoebe Litchfield; Beth Mooney (wk); Ellyse Perry; Megan Schutt; Annabel Sutherland; Georgia Voll; Georgia Wareham	Alyssa Healy (c, wk); Tahlia McGrath (vc); Darcie Brown; Ashleigh Gardner; Kim Garth; Alana King; Phoebe Litchfield; Beth Mooney (wk); Ellyse Perry; Megan Schutt; Annabel Sutherland; Georgia Voll; Georgia Wareham	Tahlia McGrath (c); ~~Alyssa Healy (c, wk)~~; Darcie Brown; Ashleigh Gardner; Kim Garth; Heather Graham; Grace Harris; Alana King; Phoebe Litchfield; Beth Mooney (wk); Ellyse Perry; Megan Schutt; Annabel Sutherland; Georgia Voll; Georgia Wareham	Heather Knight (c); Tammy Beaumont; Lauren Bell; Maia Bouchier; Kate Cross; Charlie Dean; Sophia Dunkley; Sophie Ecclestone; Lauren Filer; Bess Heath (wk); Amy Jones (wk); Ryana MacDonald-Gay; Nat Sciver-Brunt; Danni Wyatt-Hodge	Heather Knight (c); Tammy Beaumont; Lauren Bell; Maia Bouchier; Alice Capsey; Kate Cross; Charlie Dean; Sophia Dunkley; Sophie Ecclestone; Lauren Filer; Sarah Glenn; Amy Jones (wk); Nat Sciver-Brunt; Danni Wyatt-Hodge	Heather Knight (c); Lauren Bell; Maia Bouchier; Alice Capsey; Charlie Dean; Sophia Dunkley; Sophie Ecclestone; Lauren Filer; Danielle Gibson; Sarah Glenn; Bess Heath (wk); Amy Jones (wk); Freya Kemp; Linsey Smith; Nat Sciver-Brunt; Danni Wyatt-Hodge

On 23 January, Heather Graham was added to the squad for the second and third T20Is in the place of Alyssa Healy.

== Tour match ==
=== 50 over match: Governor General's XI v England Women ===
The Governor General's XI played a warm-up match against the touring England women's team on 9 January.

9 January 2025
10:05
Scorecard

Governor General's XI; 8/183 (28.2 overs)	v	England
Georgia Voll 57 (42); Sophie Ecclestone 3/27 (5 overs)

No result
North Sydney Oval, Sydney
Umpires: Clare Haysom (Aus) and Mary Waldron (Ire)

- England won the toss and elected to field.
- No further play was possible due to rain.

== ODI series ==
=== 1st ODI ===
12 January 2025
10:30
Scorecard

England; 204 (43.1 overs)	v	Australia; 6/206 (38.5 overs)
Heather Knight 39 (48); Ashleigh Gardner 3/19 (6.1 overs)		Alyssa Healy 70 (78); Sophie Ecclestone 2/38 (10 overs)

Australia won by 4 wickets
North Sydney Oval, Sydney
Umpires: Claire Polosak (Aus) and Eloise Sheridan (Aus)
Player of the match: Ashleigh Gardner (Aus)

- Australia won the toss and elected to field.
- Heather Knight (Eng) scored her 4,000th run in ODIs.
- Ashleigh Gardner (Aus) took her 100th wicket in ODIs and 200th wicket in international cricket.
- Ashes series points: Australia 2, England 0.

=== 2nd ODI ===
14 January 2025
10:05
Scorecard

Australia; 180 (44.3 overs)	v	England; 159 (48.1 overs)
Ellyse Perry 60 (74); Sophie Ecclestone 4/35 (10 overs)		Amy Jones 47* (103); Alana King 4/25 (10 overs)

Australia won by 21 runs
Junction Oval, Melbourne
Umpires: Shawn Craig (Aus) and Claire Polosak (Aus)
Player of the match: Alana King (Aus)

- England won the toss and elected to field.
- Alana King (Aus) took her 50th wicket in ODIs.
- Ashes series points: Australia 2, England 0.

=== 3rd ODI ===
17 January 2025
10:05
Scorecard

Australia; 8/308 (50 overs)	v	England; 222 (42.2 overs)
Ashleigh Gardner 102 (102); Nat Sciver-Brunt 2/51 (10 overs)		Nat Sciver-Brunt 61 (68); Alana King 5/46 (8.2 overs)

Australia won by 86 runs
Bellerive Oval, Hobart
Umpires: Phillip Gillespie (Aus) and Eloise Sheridan (Aus)
Player of the match: Ashleigh Gardner (Aus)

- Australia won the toss and elected to bat.
- Ashleigh Gardner (Aus) scored her first century in ODIs.
- Alana King (Aus) took her first five-wicket haul in ODIs.
- Ashes series points: Australia 2, England 0.

== T20I series ==
=== 1st T20I ===
20 January 2025
19:15 (N)
Scorecard

Australia; 7/198 (20 overs)	v	England; 141 (16 overs)
Beth Mooney 75 (51); Sophie Ecclestone 2/26 (4 overs)		Sophia Dunkley 59 (30); Georgia Wareham 3/25 (3 overs)

Australia won by 57 runs
Sydney Cricket Ground, Sydney
Umpires: Phillip Gillespie (Aus) and Claire Polosak (Aus)
Player of the match: Beth Mooney (Aus)

- England won the toss and elected to field.
- Georgia Voll (Aus) made her debut in T20Is.
- Ashes series points: Australia 2, England 0.
- Australia retained the Ashes as a result of this match.

=== 2nd T20I ===
23 January 2025
19:15 (N)
Scorecard

Australia; 5/185 (20 overs)	v	England; 4/168 (19.1 overs)
Tahlia McGrath 48* (35); Charlie Dean 2/28 (4 overs)		Danni Wyatt-Hodge 52 (40); Megan Schutt 2/32 (4 overs)

Australia won by 6 runs (DLS method)
Manuka Oval, Canberra
Umpires: Eloise Sheridan (Aus) and Ben Treloar (Aus)
Player of the match: Tahlia McGrath (Aus)

- England won the toss and elected to field.
- No further play was possible due to rain.
- Ashes series points: Australia 2, England 0.
- Australia won the Ashes as a result of this match.

=== 3rd T20I ===
25 January 2025
18:45 (N)
Scorecard

Australia; 5/162 (20 overs)	v	England; 90 (17.3 overs)
Beth Mooney 94* (63); Freya Kemp 1/20 (2 overs)		Heather Knight 40 (38); Georgia Wareham 3/11 (4 overs)

Australia won by 72 runs
Adelaide Oval, Adelaide
Umpires: Claire Polosak (Aus) and Eloise Sheridan (Aus)
Player of the match: Beth Mooney (Aus)

- Australia won the toss and elected to bat.
- Ashes series points: Australia 2, England 0.

== Only Test ==
30 January–1 February 2025 (D/N)
Scorecard

England	v	Australia
170 (71.4 overs); Nat Sciver-Brunt 51 (129); Alana King 4/45 (23 overs)		440 (130.3 overs); Annabel Sutherland 163 (258); Sophie Ecclestone 5/143 (44.3 overs)
148 (68.4 overs); Tammy Beaumont 47 (124); Alana King 5/53 (23.4 overs)

Australia won by an innings & 122 runs
Melbourne Cricket Ground, Melbourne
Umpires: Claire Polosak (Aus) and Eloise Sheridan (Aus)
Player of the match: Annabel Sutherland (Australia)

- Australia won the toss and elected to field.
- Georgia Voll (Aus) made her Test debut.
- Beth Mooney (Aus) scored her first century in Tests.
- Alana King (Aus) took her first five-wicket haul in Tests.
- Ashes series points: Australia 4, England 0.
