= Eliza Doddridge =

Australian cricketer

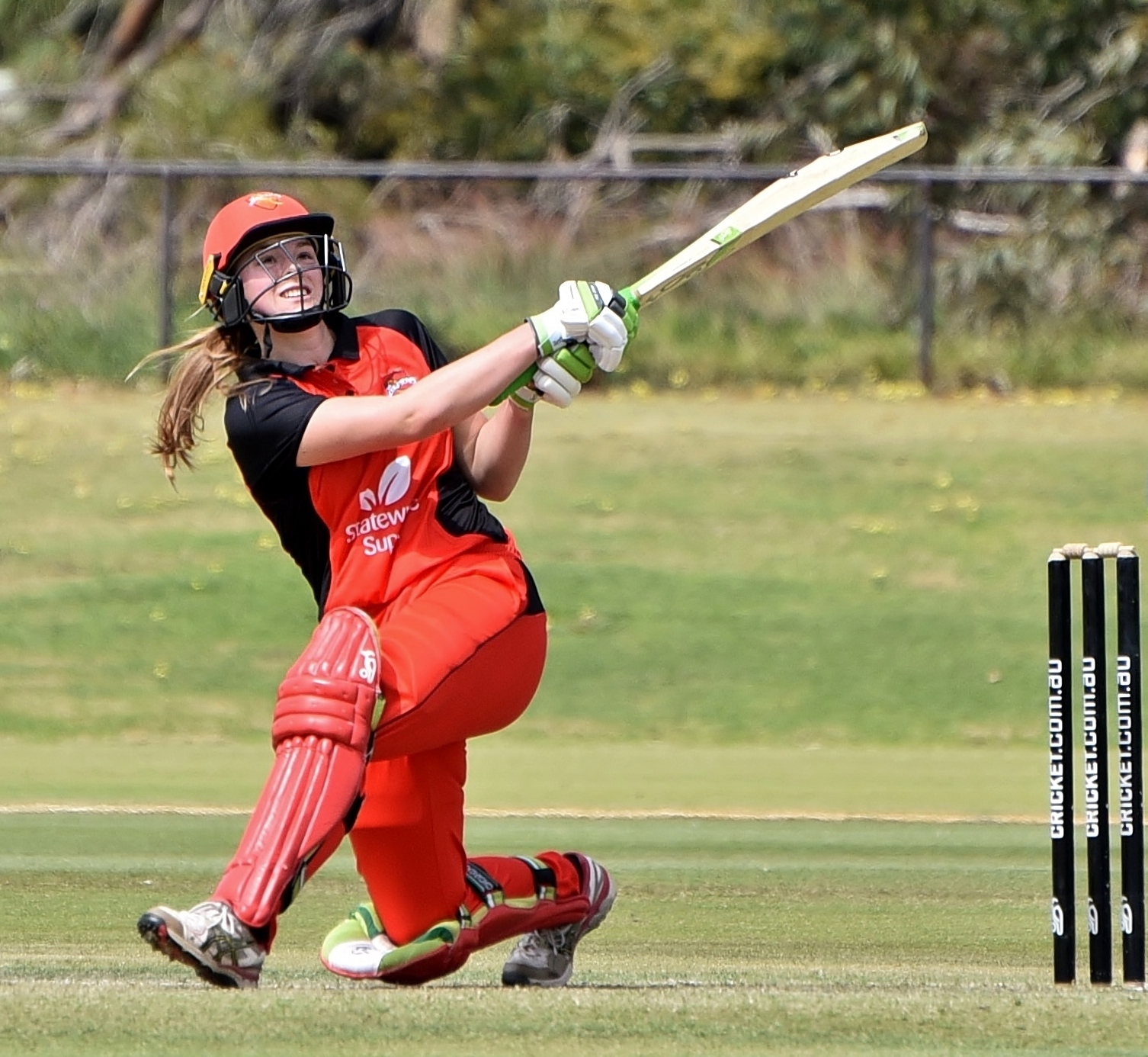
- Doddridge with South Australia in 2018

Personal information
- Full name: Eliza Kathryn Doddridge
- Born: 15 February 1999 (age 27); Adelaide, South Australia
- Batting: Right-handed
- Bowling: Right-arm medium
- Role: Batter

Domestic team information
- Years: Team
- 2017/18–2021/22: South Australia
- 2018/19: Adelaide Strikers

Career statistics
| Competition | WLA |
|---|---|
| Matches | 12 |
| Runs scored | 148 |
| Batting average | 16.44 |
| 100s/50s | 0/1 |
| Top score | 54* |
| Balls bowled | 145 |
| Wickets | 5 |
| Bowling average | 26.80 |
| 5 wickets in innings | 0 |
| 10 wickets in match | 0 |
| Best bowling | 2/24 |
| Catches/stumpings | 6/– |
- Source: CricketArchive, 28 March 2021

Eliza Kathryn Doddridge (born 15 February 1999) is an Australian cricketer who plays as a right-handed batter and occasional right-arm medium bowler. She last played for the South Australian Scorpions in the Women's National Cricket League. She made her Scorpions debut on 22 September 2018 against Victoria, scoring 15* and taking one catch. She made her first half-century on 11 November 2018, scoring 54* against Queensland Fire. Doddridge was a member of the Adelaide Strikers squad for the 2018–19 Women's Big Bash League season but did not make an appearance.
