= Tahlia McGrath =

Australian cricketer

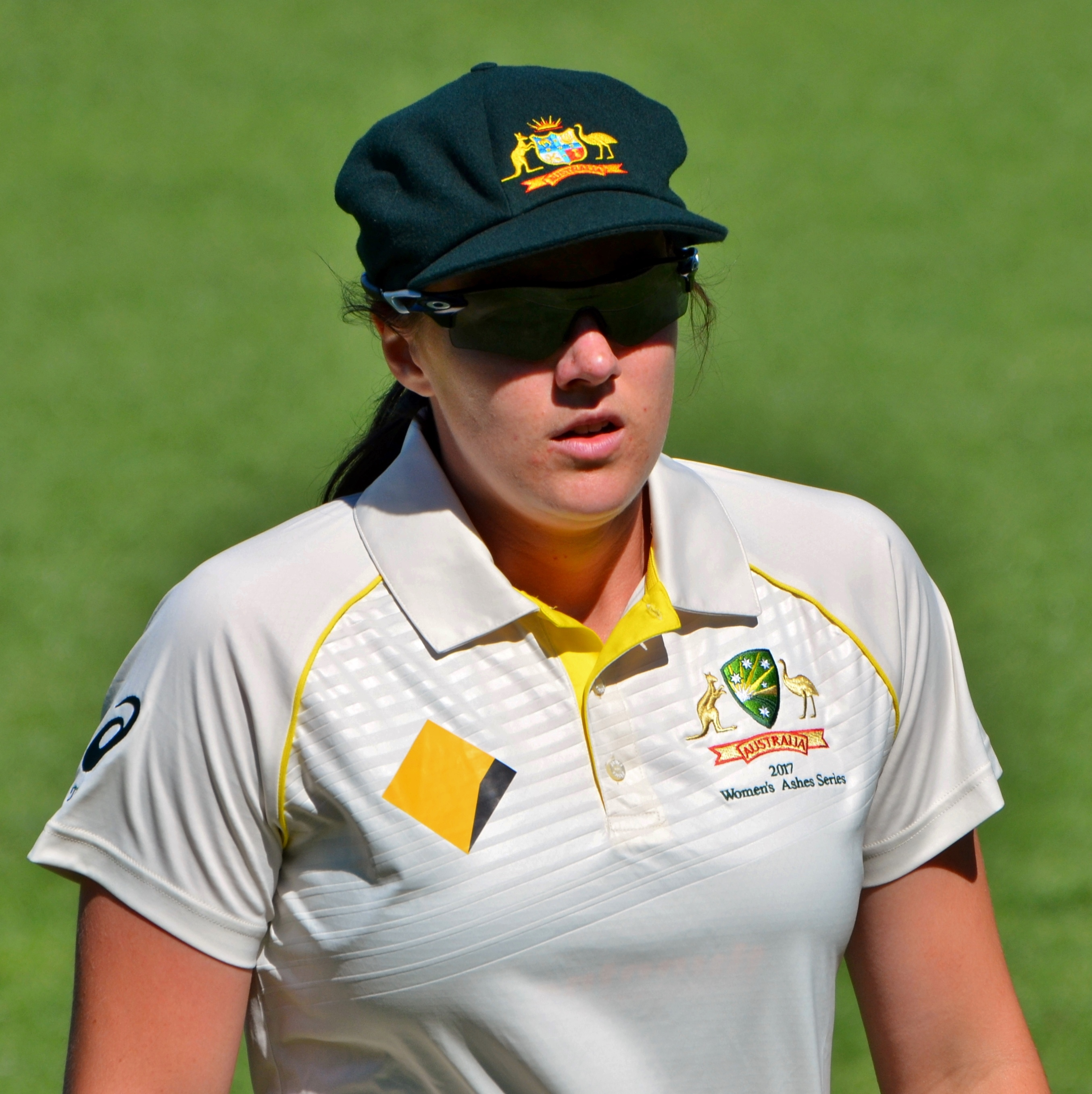
- McGrath fielding during her Test debut

Personal information
- Full name: Tahlia May McGrath
- Born: 10 November 1995 (age 31); Adelaide, South Australia
- Nickname: T-Mac
- Batting: Right-handed
- Bowling: Right-arm medium
- Role: All-rounder

International information
- National side: Australia
- Test debut (cap 171): 9 November 2017 v England
- Last Test: 30 January 2025 v England
- ODI debut (cap 131): 27 November 2016 v South Africa
- Last ODI: 17 January 2025 v England
- ODI shirt no.: 32
- T20I debut (cap 56): 7 October 2021 v India
- Last T20I: 25 January 2025 v England
- T20I shirt no.: 32

Domestic team information
- Years: Team
- 2011/12–present: South Australia
- 2015/16–present: Adelaide Strikers
- 2019: Lancashire Thunder
- 2022: Southern Brave
- 2023–present: UP Warriorz

Career statistics
Competition	WTest	WODI	WT20I	WLA
Matches	6	46	53	116
Runs scored	346	771	1,124	2,774
Batting average	38.44	29.65	41.62	30.15
100s/50s	0/4	0/5	0/7	2/16
Top score	73	74	91*	111*
Balls bowled	636	915	315	3,282
Wickets	11	25	20	87
Bowling average	24.00	31.52	21.05	31.35
5 wickets in innings	0	0	0	0
10 wickets in match	0	0	0	0
Best bowling	3/24	3/4	3/13	4/40
Catches/stumpings	6/–	20/–	14/–	43/–
Medal record
Women's Cricket
Representing Australia
Commonwealth Games
Gold medal – first place	2022 Birmingham
World Cup
Winner	2022 New Zealand
T20 World Cup
Winner	2023 South Africa
Winner	2026 England & Wales
- Source: CricketArchive, 25 January 2025

Tahlia May McGrath (born 10 November 1995) is an Australian international cricketer who is the vice-captain of the Australia women's national cricket team. She made her Women's One Day International cricket (WODI) debut against South Africa on 27 November 2016. She made her women's Test debut in The Women's Ashes in November 2017.

== Career ==
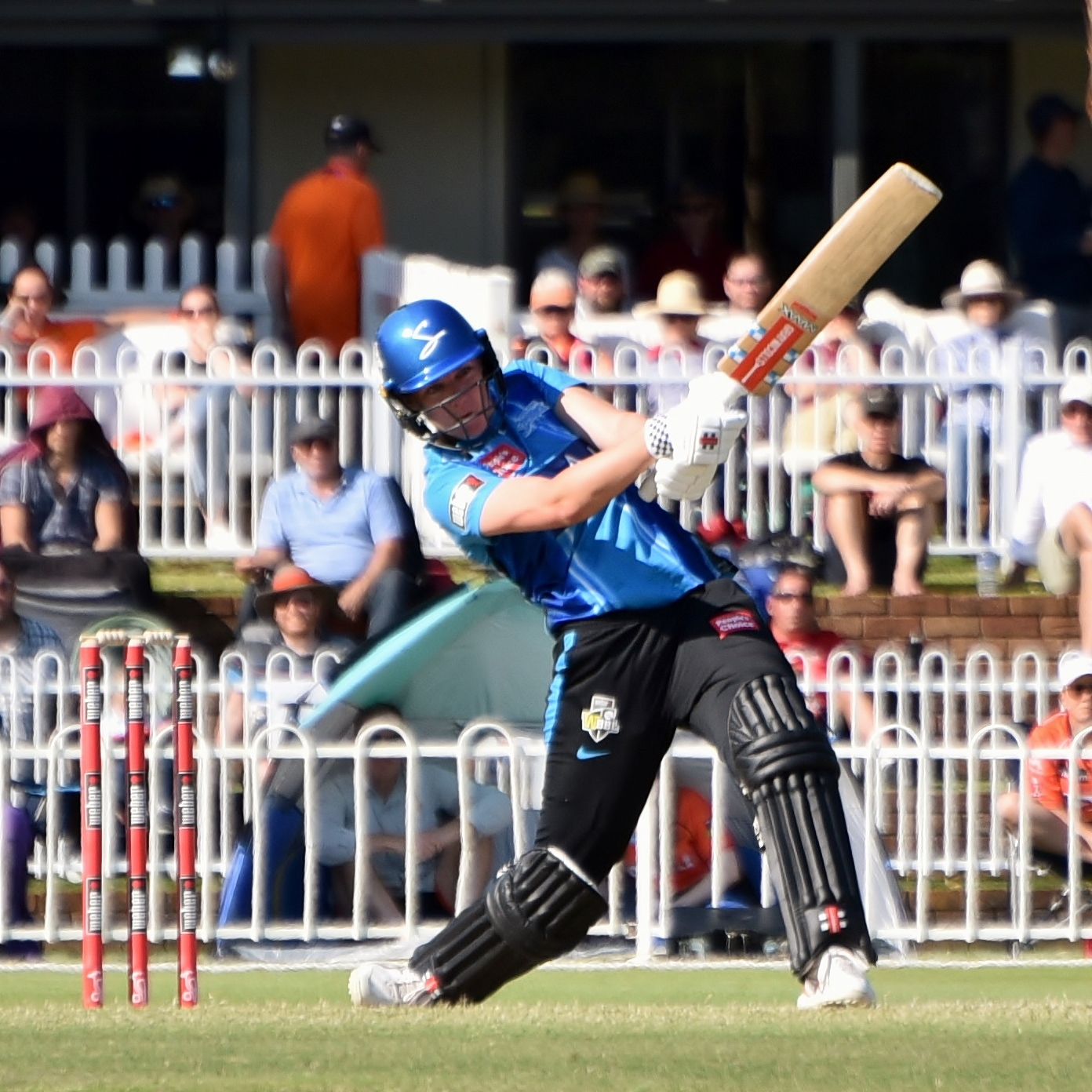
McGrath batting for Adelaide Strikers during WBBL–07

After missing out on Australia's squad for the 2017 Women's Cricket World Cup, McGrath was recalled to the team when she was named in Australia's squad for the Women's Ashes. She was named in both the WODI squad and the Test squad. On 26 October 2017, she took her first international wicket in the second WODI match against England.

She made her Test debut for Australia Women against England Women on 9 November 2017 in The Women's Ashes.

In November 2018, she was named in the Adelaide Strikers' squad for the 2018–19 Women's Big Bash League season. In April 2019, Cricket Australia awarded her with a contract with the National Performance Squad ahead of the 2019–20 season. In April 2020, Cricket Australia awarded McGrath with a central contract ahead of the 2020–21 season.

In August 2021, McGrath was named in Australia's squad for their series against India, which included a one-off day/night Test match as part of the tour. On 21 September 2021, in the first of the series' three WODI matches at Great Barrier Reef Arena, Mackay, Queensland, she swung the ball both ways while bowling, and really troubled some of India's best players, but did not take a wicket, and did not bat. In the second WODI on 24 September 2021, also at Mackay, she claimed 3-45, and then made a career-best 74 in 77 balls, sharing in a partnership with Beth Mooney that helped to propel Australia from the lowest point in its run chase to a cliffhanging victory. She made her Women's Twenty20 International (WT20I) debut on 7 October 2021, for Australia against India.

In January 2022, McGrath was named in Australia's squad for their series against England to contest the Women's Ashes. In the first match of the series, a WT20I fixture, McGrath became the first Australian all-rounder to take three wickets and score more than 75 runs in a WT20I, finishing with figures of 3-26 and an unbeaten 91 off 49 balls. McGrath was named the Player of the Series, after scoring 225 runs and taking 11 wickets during the Women's Ashes.

Also in January 2022, McGrath was named in Australia's team for the 2022 Women's Cricket World Cup in New Zealand. In April 2022, she was bought by the Southern Brave for the 2022 season of The Hundred in England. The following month, McGrath was named in Australia's team for the cricket tournament at the 2022 Commonwealth Games in Birmingham, England.

In August 2022 during Commonwealth Games 2022, McGrath was allowed to play against India despite testing positive for COVID-19 with mild symptoms

She was named in the Australia squad for the 2024 ICC Women's T20 World Cup and the 2025 Women's Ashes series.
