= Amanda-Jade Wellington =

Australian cricketer

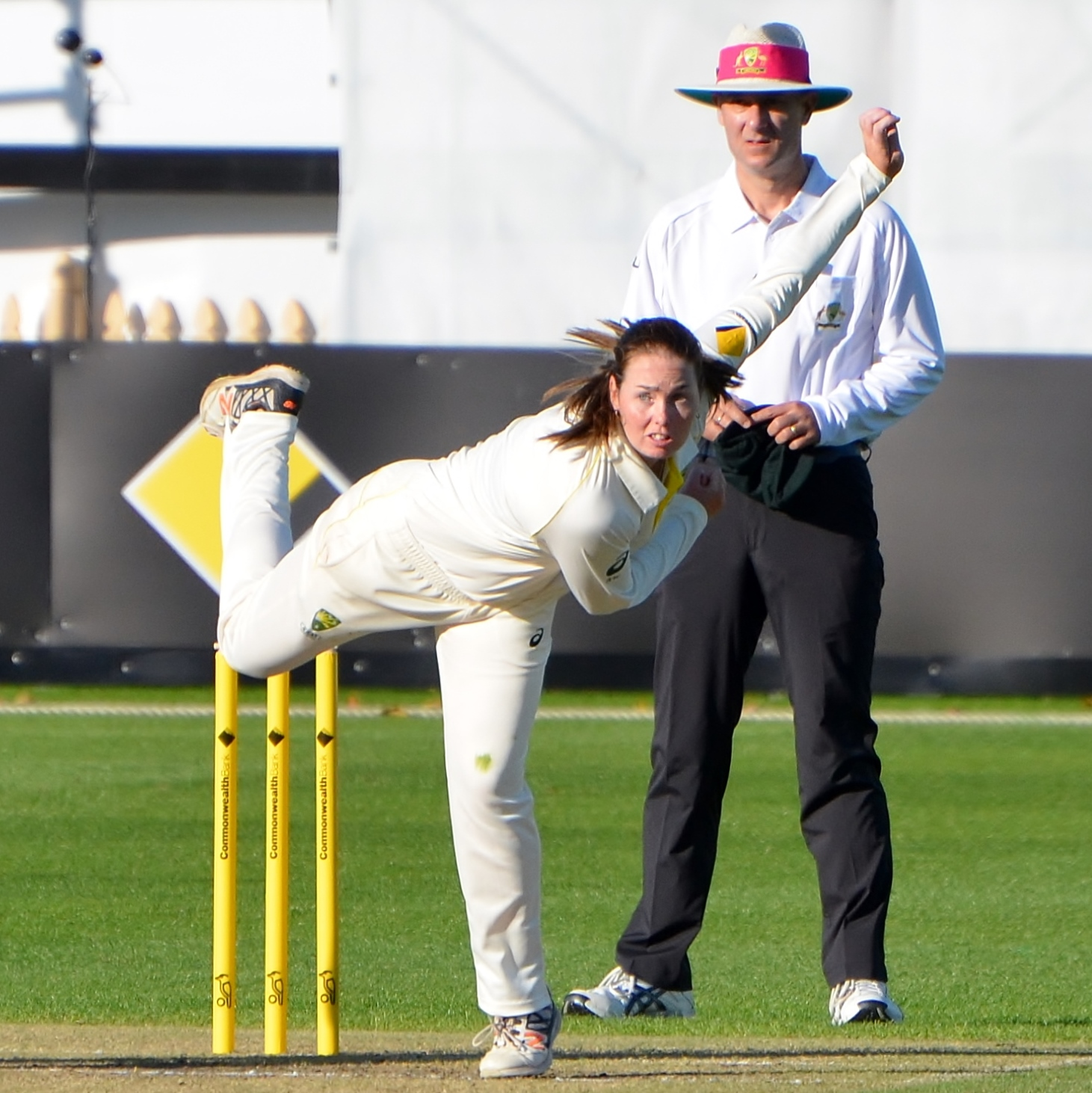
- Wellington during her Test debut

Personal information
- Full name: Amanda-Jade Wellington
- Born: 29 May 1997 (age 29); Adelaide, South Australia
- Batting: Right-handed
- Bowling: Right-arm leg break
- Role: Bowler

International information
- National side: Australia (2016–present)
- Only Test (cap 173): 9 November 2017 v England
- ODI debut (cap 132): 27 November 2016 v South Africa
- Last ODI: 13 March 2022 v New Zealand
- T20I debut (cap 46): 17 February 2017 v New Zealand
- Last T20I: 31 March 2018 v England

Domestic team information
- Years: Team
- 2012/13–present: South Australia
- 2015/16–present: Adelaide Strikers
- 2019: Southern Vipers
- 2019/20: Otago
- 2021–2022: Southern Brave
- 2022/23: Northern Districts
- 2023: Manchester Originals
- 2023–present: Barbados Royals
- 2024: Western Storm
- 2024–present: Oval Invincibles
- 2025: Somerset

Career statistics
Competition	WTest	WODI	WT20I	WLA
Matches	1	14	8	115
Runs scored	2	17	9	1,473
Batting average	2.00	2.83	9.00	19.38
100s/50s	0/0	0/0	0/0	1/5
Top score	2	11	8	116
Balls bowled	342	672	120	5,432
Wickets	2	18	10	169
Bowling average	65.00	29.77	11.20	24.93
5 wickets in innings	0	0	0	1
10 wickets in match	0	0	0	–
Best bowling	1/61	3/24	4/16	6/25
Catches/stumpings	0/–	3/–	3/–	26/–
Medal record
Women's Cricket
Representing Australia
Commonwealth Games
Gold medal – first place	2022 Birmingham
World Cup
Winner	2022 New Zealand
T20 World Cup
Winner	2018 West Indies
- Source: ESPNcricinfo, 20 October 2024

Amanda-Jade Wellington (born 29 May 1997) is an Australian cricketer. She bowls right-arm leg spin and plays for the South Australian Scorpions in the Women's National Cricket League (WNCL) and the Adelaide Strikers in the Women's Big Bash League (WBBL). Making her WNCL debut in 2012 at the age of 15, she is the youngest person to ever represent the state of South Australia in senior cricket. Since 2016 she has represented Australia in all three forms of international cricket, Tests, ODIs and T20Is.

== Career ==
=== Youth and domestic career ===
Inspired by Australian Test cricketer Shane Warne, Wellington taught herself to bowl leg spin in her backyard. Wellington began her career playing for Port Adelaide Cricket Club. She rose to prominence in December 2011 when she was the player of the tournament in the national under-15 championships, playing for her home state of South Australia, and the next season she was selected to play for the South Australian Scorpions, South Australia's representative women's team. She made her debut for the Scorpions in the Women's National Cricket League (WNCL) at the age of 15 years and 150 days, becoming the youngest person, male or female, to represent South Australia in a senior match, breaking the record set by Clem Hill in the 1892–93 season, more than one hundred years earlier. She proved her worth early in her state career, just a fortnight after her debut, helping South Australia to a win over Tasmania. At the end of the 2012–13 season she had played 4 matches in the WNCL and 8 matches in the Australian Women's Twenty20 Cup with 10 wickets between the two formats.

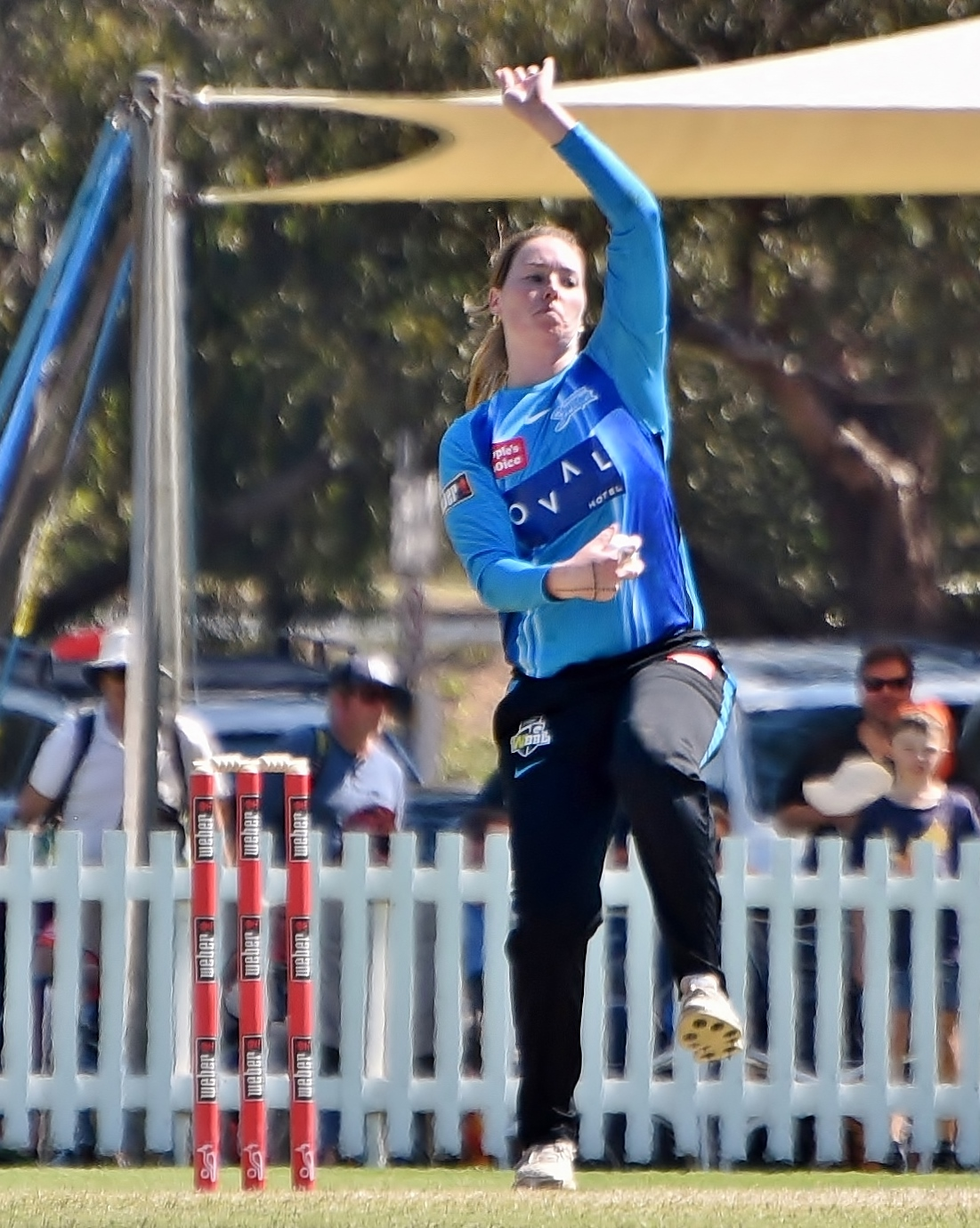
Wellington bowling for Adelaide Strikers during WBBL|07

Wellington continued to play for the Scorpions in the following seasons, and in the 2014–15 season she gained the attention of the Cricket Australia Women's National Selection Panel. She was included in Australia's second XI team, the Shooting Stars, for their tour of Sri Lanka, on which they won every match. She was then included in the Shooting Stars' squad for their trip to Dubai, where they played matches against the ECB Academy.

After consistently strong form for the Scorpions and bowling figures of 3/13 in a Women's Big Bash League (WBBL) match for the Adelaide Strikers in the inaugural season of the tournament, Wellington was selected to play for the Governor-General's XI in a tour match against India. Her form continued to improve in the 2016–17 season and she was South Australia's leading run-scorer in grade cricket with 325 runs at an average of 81.25, prompting selection in international matches for the first time.

In November 2018, she was named in the Adelaide Strikers' squad for the 2018–19 Women's Big Bash League season. In 2021, she was drafted by Southern Brave for the inaugural season of The Hundred.

On 24 November 2021, in the Eliminator match of the 2021–22 Women's Big Bash League season, Wellington took the best figures in the history of the WBBL, with five for eight from her four overs. It was her 100th match in the WBBL, and she also took her 100th WBBL wicket in the game.

In April 2022, she was signed by the Southern Brave for the 2022 season of The Hundred in England. In December 2022, it was announced that Wellington had signed for Northern Districts to play in the 2022–23 Super Smash. In March 2024, it was announced that she had signed for Western Storm for the upcoming season.

=== International career ===
Wellington made her Women's One Day International cricket (ODI) debut against South Africa on 27 November 2016. With her very first ball in international cricket she took the wicket of South African captain Mignon du Preez, going on to finish the innings with figures of 1/35. She started to become a standout performer during New Zealand's tour of Australia. She made her Women's Twenty20 International cricket (T20I) debut against New Zealand on 17 February 2017, with figures of 3/15 on debut and 4/16 in the final match of the series.

Having become a regular member of Australia's national team, Wellington was given her first contract with Cricket Australia in April 2017. Wellington was named in both Australia's ODI and Test squads for the 2017–18 Women's Ashes. She made her Test debut for Australia against England Women on 9 November 2017 in the Women's Ashes.

In December 2017, she was named as one of the players in the ICC Women's T20I Team of the Year. In April 2018, she was one of the fourteen players to be awarded a national contract for the 2018–19 season by Cricket Australia. In April 2019, Cricket Australia awarded her with a contract with the National Performance Squad ahead of the 2019–20 season.

In January 2022, Wellington was named in Australia's A squad for their series against England A, with the matches being played alongside the Women's Ashes. Later the same month, she was named in Australia's team for the 2022 Women's Cricket World Cup in New Zealand. In May 2022, Wellington was named in Australia's team for the cricket tournament at the 2022 Commonwealth Games in Birmingham, England. Wellington has not played international cricket since 2022, which former England spinner Alex Hartley has attributed to her lack of fitness.
