= Beth Mooney =

Australian cricketer (born 1994)

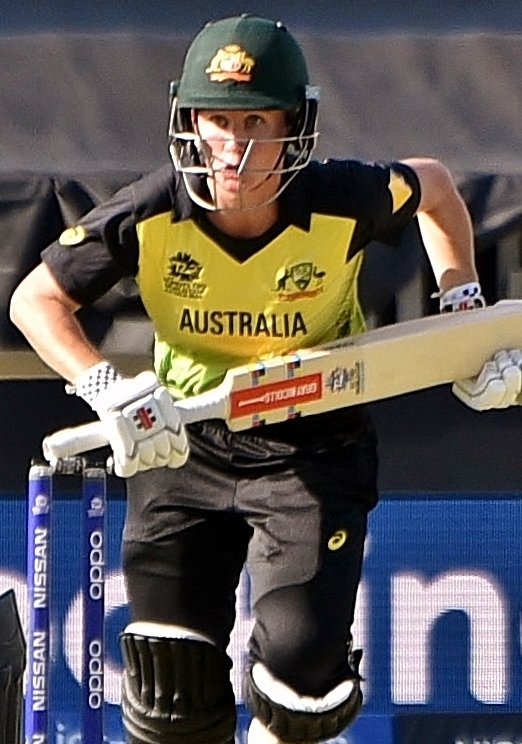
- Mooney batting for Australia during the 2020 ICC Women's T20 World Cup

Personal information
- Full name: Bethany Louise Mooney
- Born: 14 January 1994 (age 32); Shepparton, Victoria, Australia
- Batting: Left-handed
- Role: Wicket-keeper-batter

International information
- National side: Australia (2016–present)
- Test debut (cap 172): 9 November 2017 v England
- Last Test: 30 January 2025 v England
- ODI debut (cap 130): 20 February 2016 v New Zealand
- Last ODI: 24 February 2026 v India
- T20I debut (cap 41): 26 January 2016 v India
- Last T20I: 21 February 2026 v India
- T20I shirt no.: 6

Domestic team information
- Years: Team
- 2009/10–2021/22: Queensland
- 2014/15: Northern Districts
- 2015: Yorkshire
- 2015/16–2019/20: Brisbane Heat
- 2016, 2018: Yorkshire Diamonds
- 2018: Trailblazers
- 2020/21–present: Perth Scorchers
- 2022: London Spirit
- 2022/23: Western Australia
- 2023–present: Gujarat Giants
- 2024–2025: Manchester Originals
- 2026-present: Trent Rockets

Career statistics
Competition	WTest	WODI	WT20I
Matches	8	93	115
Runs scored	559	3,073	3,438
Batting average	43.00	48.77	41.42
100s/50s	1/4	5/20	2/27
Top score	106	138	117*
Catches/stumpings	10/0	50/2	49/4
Medal record
Women's Cricket
Representing Australia
Commonwealth Games
Gold medal – first place	2022 Birmingham
World Cup
Winner	2022 New Zealand
T20 World Cup
Winner	2018 West Indies
Winner	2020 Australia
Winner	2023 South Africa
Winner	2026 England
- Source: ESPNcricinfo, 24 February 2026

Bethany Louise Mooney (born 14 January 1994) is an Australian professional cricketer who plays for the Australia women's national team as a batter in all three formats of the game. At the domestic level, she plays as a wicket-keeper-batter for Western Australia, Perth Scorchers in WBBL and for Gujarat Giants in WPL. In March 2020, at the conclusion of the ICC Women's T20 World Cup 2020, she became the world's number one batter in Women's Twenty20 International (WT20I) cricket.

== Early life and career ==
Mooney was born in Shepparton, Victoria. She has a brother, Tom, and a sister, Gabrielle. As a child, she played many sports, ranging from soccer to tennis and Australian rules football. Shortly before her eighth birthday, she was invited to fill-in for her brother's cricket team; that invitation turned into her making regular appearances for Kialla Lakes Cricket Club.

When Mooney was 10 years old, she and her family moved to Hervey Bay, Queensland, where she attended Star of the Sea Catholic Primary School and Xavier Catholic College. Early in the mornings before school in Hervey Bay, she and her father would go riding their bikes along the Esplanade, and sea kayaking with their dog.

Mooney did not start playing cricket in Queensland until a year after her move. At that year's Hervey Bay Zone trials, she was identified as the best catcher in her team, and was advised by the team's coach to try wicket-keeping. She was then selected as a wicket-keeper for the Queensland Primary School girls' team, and later progressed through higher level junior Queensland girls' teams. Meanwhile, she played for Hervey Bay's boys' Cavaliers team until she was 18 years old, as there were no girls' cricket teams in rural areas.

By the time she was about 13, Mooney was already being tipped to play cricket for Australia. She also made really good friends in cricket, and that kept her in the game, as did her enjoyment of travelling to Brisbane and national competitions, and missing school for a few days to play. Additionally, she felt that interstate girls' cricket was a step up from the men's cricket she was playing in Hervey Bay.

Upon leaving school, Mooney started a teaching degree. However, she quit her studies in 2014 to focus on cricket, after realising that she would have only one chance to make it in the game.

== Domestic career ==
=== Australia ===
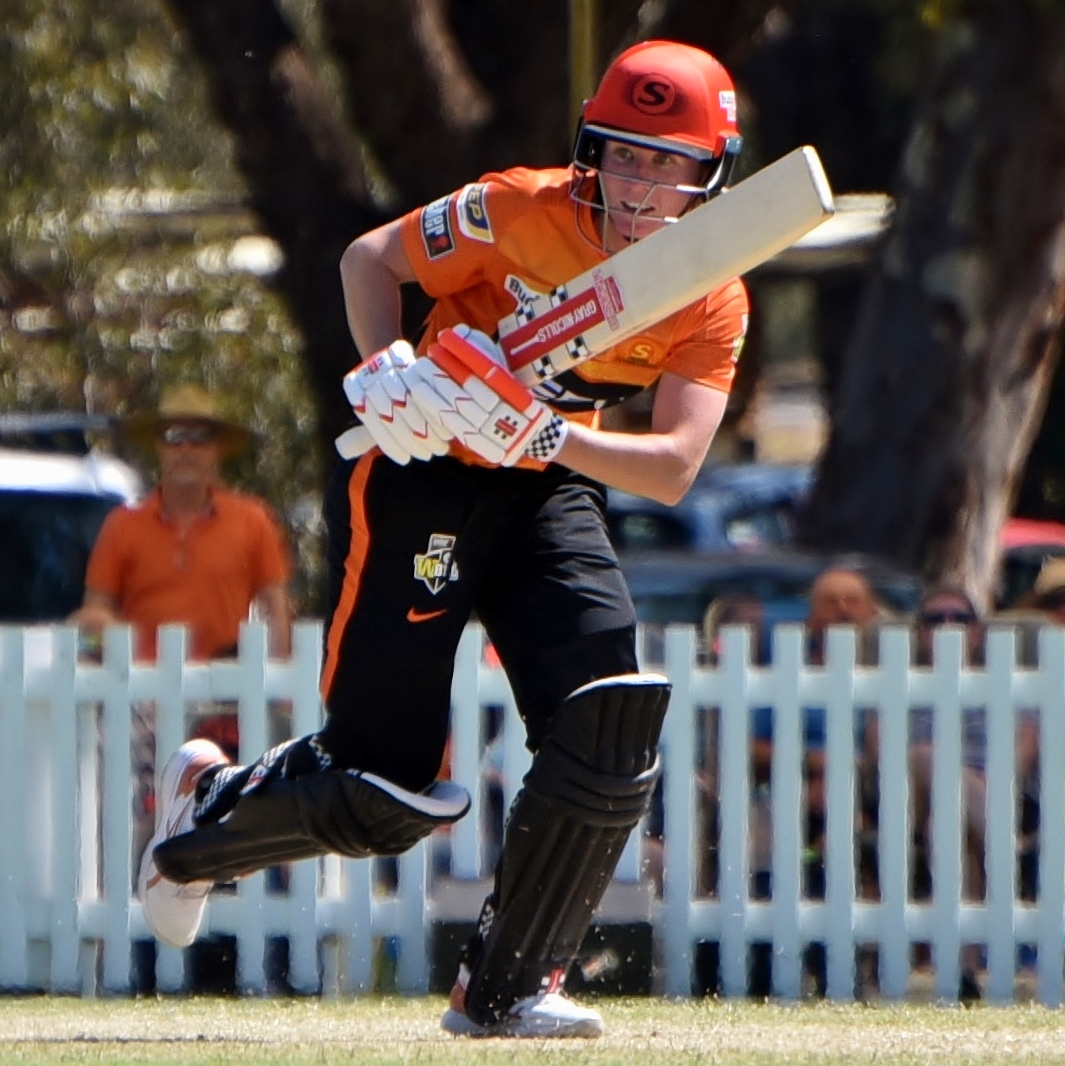
Mooney batting for Perth Scorchers during WBBL|07

Mooney made her debut for the Queensland Fire in the Women's National Cricket League four days after her 16th birthday in 2010. Currently, she plays as a wicket-keeper/batter for Western Australia and Perth Scorchers.

In November 2018, Mooney was named in Brisbane Heat's squad for the 2018–19 Women's Big Bash League season (WBBL|04). During the final of the WBBL|04 tournament, held on a sweltering Australia Day 2019, she overcame a dizziness-inducing illness to score a player of the match-winning 65 runs from 46 balls. (However, the opposition wicket-keeper Alyssa Healy appeared to sledge Mooney during her innings, saying on the player mic, "It's actually not that hot out here") Her innings inspired the Heat to its maiden Women's Big Bash title, with a three-wicket victory over the heavily favoured Sydney Sixers.

On 21 November 2020, Mooney became the first player to score 3000 runs in the Women's Big Bash League competition.

=== England ===
In April 2022, Mooney was bought by the London Spirit for the 2022 season of The Hundred in England.

=== India ===
In the inaugural season of the Indian Women's Premier League in 2023, Beth Mooney was bought by Gujarat Giants (GG) at the price of ₹2 crore (approximately US$240,000 at the time). She was subsequently named captain of the side. However, she suffered a calf injury in the tournament opener against the Mumbai Indians, and was ruled out of the remainder of the season. South African batter Laura Wolvaardt replaced her in the side, while the captaincy passed to Sneh Rana.

Mooney returned to captain the side in the 2024 edition. Although GG suffered a second consecutive bottom place finish, Mooney's own form was one of the few bright spots for the team, with 285 runs in 8 innings at a strike rate of 141.08 which included three consecutive half-centuries. Her unbeaten 85(51) helped GG register the season's highest total of 199/5 in a victory against eventual champions Royal Challengers Bangalore.

Prior to the 2025 Edition, all-rounder Ashleigh Gardner replaced Mooney as captain of the franchise. The change in leadership produced immediate dividends for the Giants, as they won 4 of their 8 league matches to qualify for the Playoffs for the first time in their history. Mooney herself played a decisive role in this change in fortunes, scoring 237 runs across 9 innings at a strike rate of 128.10. She was the second highest run-scorer for the Giants, and her tally included a knock of 96*(59) against the UP Warriorz, the highest individual score for a Gujarat Giants batter. Her season ended with a defeat in the Eliminator to eventual champions Mumbai Indians.

Mooney was retained by the Giants ahead of the 2026 WPL Mega Auction for a fee of ₹2.5 crore (approximately US$275,000 at the time). She was one of only two (out of a maximum of five) players retained by the Giants, the other being Ashleigh Gardner. In the 2026 WPL season, Mooney recorded 258 runs at a strike rate of 122.27 – the most for any GG batter in the season and 8th highest in the tournament. This included a key 62*(51) against the Delhi Capitals in the Eliminator, which unfortunately was not enough to seal victory for the Giants as they fell just short of the finals for the second year in a row.

== International career ==
Mooney was a member of the victorious Southern Stars squad that won the 2014 ICC World Twenty20 title in Bangladesh. Mooney played her first game for the Australia women's national cricket team in a Twenty20 match against India on 26 January 2016 at the Adelaide Oval. On 26 February 2017, she scored her maiden Women's One Day International (WODI) hundred against New Zealand.

Mooney's consistently good performances for Australia in 2016–17, during which she scored 334 runs in her nine WODIs at an average of 41.75, and became the first Queenslander to score a WODI century, led to her achieving her primary goal for that summer: selection in the team's 15-member squad for the 2017 Women's Cricket World Cup in England.

She also made her Test debut for Australia against England on 9 November 2017 in the Women's Ashes.

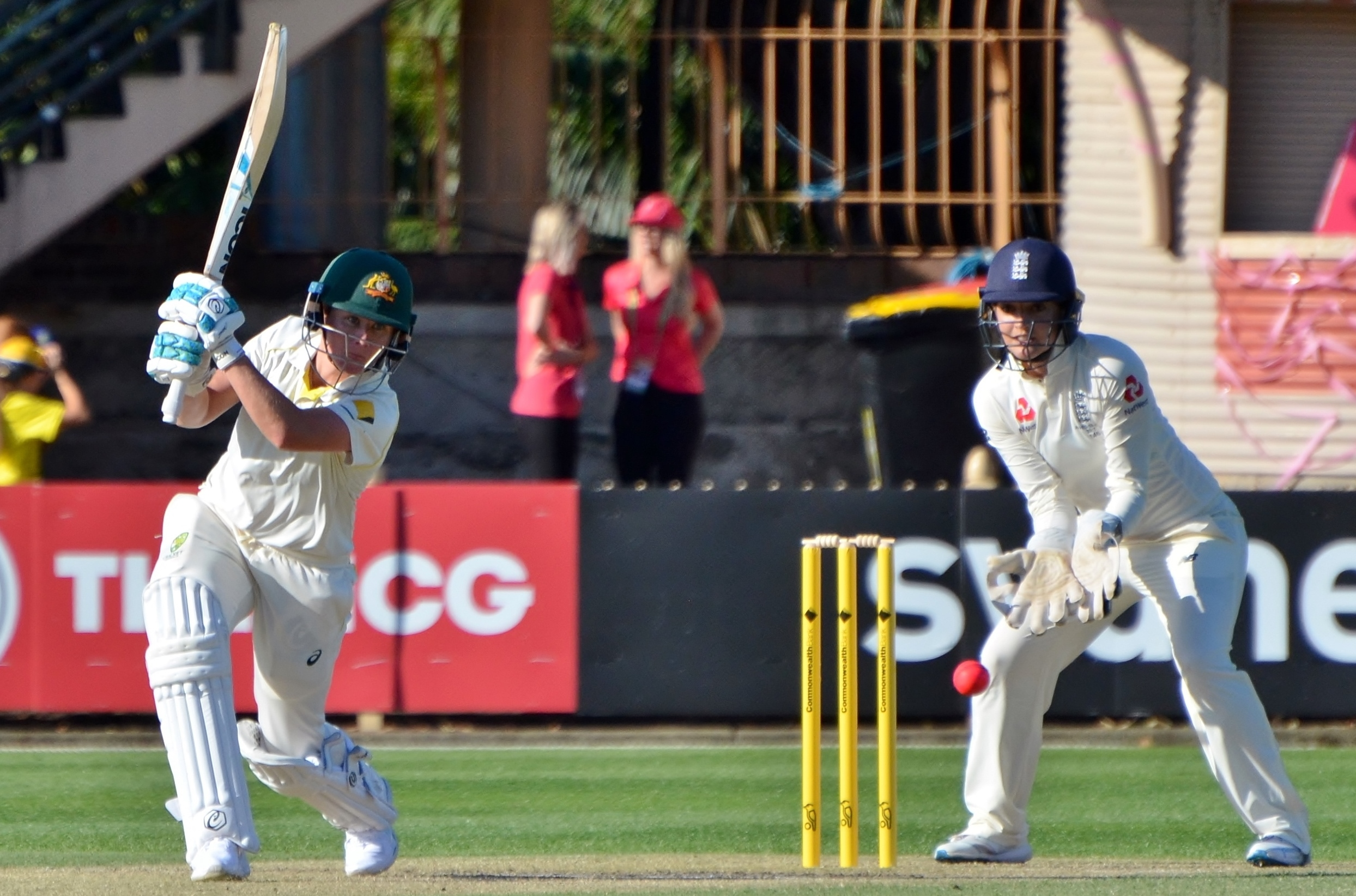
Mooney during the 2017–18 Women's Ashes

In December 2017, she won both the inaugural ICC T20I Player of the Year and Emerging Player of the Year awards. In April 2018, she was one of the fourteen players to be awarded a national contract for the 2018–19 season by Cricket Australia. In October 2018, she was named in Australia's squad for the 2018 ICC Women's World Twenty20 tournament in the West Indies.

In April 2019, Cricket Australia awarded her with a contract ahead of the 2019–20 season. In June 2019, Cricket Australia named her in Australia's team for their tour to England to contest the Women's Ashes.

In January 2020, she was named in Australia's squad for the 2020 ICC Women's T20 World Cup in Australia. In Australia's match against Bangladesh, Mooney and Alyssa Healy combined for an opening partnership of 151 runs, the highest partnership for Australia Women for any wicket in a WT20I match. In the final, Mooney top-scored for Australia, finishing unbeaten on 78 off 54 balls to help Australia win their fifth title. Mooney also finished as the tournament's leading runs scorer with 259 runs, including the most fours (30), and was named player of the tournament.

In February 2021, Mooney voiced her ambition to eventually succeed Alyssa Healy as the national team's first choice wicket-keeper. On 15 April 2021, Mooney was named as the Wisden Leading Woman Cricketer in the World for her performances the previous year. On the same day, it was announced that she had retained her Australian central contract.

In January 2022, Mooney was named in Australia's squad for their series against England to contest the Women's Ashes. Later the same month, she was named in Australia's team for the 2022 Women's Cricket World Cup in New Zealand. She hit 330 runs, including a half-century in the final, helping Australia clinch the World Cup title. In May 2022, Mooney was named in Australia's team for the cricket tournament at the 2022 Commonwealth Games in Birmingham, England. She was leading run-scorer, with 179, and the player of the match for her 61 in the final, as Australia won the Commonwealth Games. She scored 918 international runs at an average of 65 in the year 2022, and was named as the Wisden Leading Woman Cricketer in the World for her performances.

She was named in the Australia squad for the 2024 ICC Women's T20 World Cup and the 2025 Women's Ashes series.

== Off the field ==
Interviewers have described Mooney as "flying under the radar", something she prefers to do. However, she admitted in June 2020 that in light of her recent success on the field, keeping a low profile was going to be more difficult. She also said that "... it's all good if I can’t!"

== International centuries ==
On 1 February 2025, Mooney became the fourth woman, and first Australian woman, to score a century in all three international formats, when she completed the maiden Test century (of 106 runs) she had started the previous day, during the Only Test of the 2024–25 Women's Ashes series at the Melbourne Cricket Ground. She had reached her maiden international century in the first match of the 2016–17 Rose Bowl WODI series against New Zealand, at Eden Park, Auckland, in February 2017, scoring exactly 100 runs.

In November 2017, Mooney scored her maiden T20I century, the first scored by any woman in Australia, in the final match of the 2017–18 Women's Ashes at Manuka Oval, Canberra. She made 117 not out from 70 balls. Since then, she has scored four further international centuries, one in a T20I, two in One Day Internationals, and the maiden Test century.

Test centuries
Runs	Match	Opponent	City	Venue	Year
106	8	England	Melbourne, Australia	Melbourne Cricket Ground	2025

- Source: CricInfo

One Day International centuries
Runs	Match	Opponent	City	Venue	Year
100	7	New Zealand	Auckland, New Zealand	Eden Park Outer Oval	2017
125*	43	India	Mackay, Australia	Great Barrier Reef Arena	2021
133	57	Pakistan	Sydney, Australia	North Sydney Oval	2023
138	85	India	New Delhi, India	Arun Jaitley Cricket Stadium	2025
109	87	Pakistan	Colombo, Sri Lanka	R. Premadasa Stadium	2025

- Source: CricInfo

Twenty20 International centuries
Runs	Match	Opponent	City	Venue	Year
117*	16	England	Canberra, Australia	Manuka Oval	2017
113	39	Sri Lanka	Sydney, Australia	North Sydney Oval	2019

- Source: CricInfo

== Honours ==
=== Team ===
- 3× ICC Women's World Twenty20 champion: 2018, 2020, 2023
- Women's Cricket World Cup champion: 2022
- Commonwealth Games champion: 2022
- 3× Women's Big Bash League champion: 2018–19, 2019–20, 2021–22
- Women's National Cricket League champion: 2020–21

=== Individual ===
- 2x Wisden Leading Woman Cricketer in the World: 2020, 2022
- ICC Women's World Twenty20 Player of the Tournament: 2020
- Commonwealth Games Player of the Gold Medal Match: 2022
- 2× Belinda Clark Award winner: 2021, 2023
- Women's Big Bash League Player of the Tournament: 2016–17

== See also ==
- List of centuries in women's One Day International cricket
- List of centuries in women's Twenty20 International cricket
