= Ashleigh Gardner =

Australian cricketer

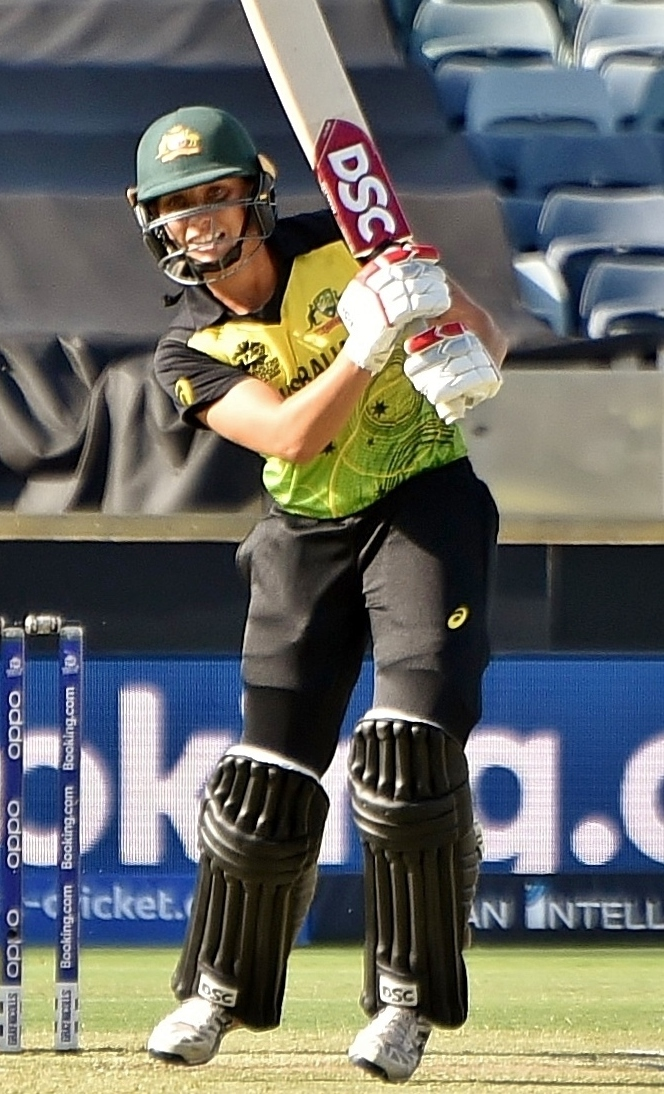
- Gardner during the 2020 Women's T20 World Cup

Personal information
- Full name: Ashleigh Katherine Gardner
- Born: 15 April 1997 (age 29); Bankstown, New South Wales, Australia
- Nickname: Ash
- Batting: Right-handed
- Bowling: Right-arm off spin
- Role: All-rounder

International information
- National side: Australia (2017–present)
- Test debut (cap 174): 18 July 2019 v England
- Last Test: 1 February 2025 v England
- ODI debut (cap 134): 2 March 2017 v New Zealand
- Last ODI: 30 October 2025 v India
- ODI shirt no.: 63
- T20I debut (cap 44): 17 February 2017 v New Zealand
- Last T20I: 21 March 2025 v New Zealand
- T20I shirt no.: 63

Domestic team information
- Years: Team
- 2015–2017, 2018–present: New South Wales
- 2015–present: Sydney Sixers (squad no. 6)
- 2015–16: Northern Districts
- 2017–18: South Australia
- 2023–present: Gujarat Giants
- 2025-: Trent Rockets

Career statistics
Competition	WTest	WODI	WT20I
Matches	7	87	96
Runs scored	325	1,654	1,411
Batting average	32.50	33.08	24.75
100s/50s	0/3	3/8	0/6
Top score	65	115	93
Balls bowled	1,302	3,561	1,474
Wickets	28	111	78
Bowling average	19.71	23.05	20.64
5 wickets in innings	1	1	1
10 wickets in match	1	0	0
Best bowling	8/66	5/30	5/12
Catches/stumpings	4/–	43/–	27/–
Medal record
Women's Cricket
Representing Australia
Commonwealth Games
Gold medal – first place	2022 Birmingham
World Cup
Winner	2022 New Zealand
T20 World Cup
Winner	2018 West Indies
Winner	2020 Australia
Winner	2023 South Africa
Winner	2026 England & Wales
- Source: ESPNcricinfo, 5 January 2026

Ashleigh Katherine Gardner (born 15 April 1997) is an Australian cricketer who currently plays for the Australia women's national team as an all-rounder. A right-handed batter and right-arm off spinner, Gardner also plays for New South Wales in the Women's National Cricket League (WNCL), for the Sydney Sixers in the Women's Big Bash League (WBBL) and for the Gujarat Giants in the Women's Premier League (WPL). She has won three world championships and four national titles with her respective teams, while also gaining numerous individual honours, including the Belinda Clark Award.

== Early and personal life ==
Gardner was born in the Sydney suburb of Bankstown, and attended Picnic Point High School. An Indigenous Australian through her mother's Muruwari heritage, she formed the Ashleigh Gardner Foundation with the goal to "increase the percentage of Aboriginal kids finishing high school".

During the global pandemic in 2020, Gardner developed an "isolation hobby", trying her hand at dot painting. Her work was enthusiastically received on social media, with several notable cricketers—including Moises Henriques, Mel Jones, Nicole Bolton and Alyssa Healy—commissioning pieces from her. The following year, she painted a pair of boots for GWS Giants footballer Erin Todd to wear during Indigenous Round of the AFL Women's competition.

Gardner married her long-time girlfriend, Monica Wright, in April 2025. The couple got engaged in April 2024, with Gardner announcing it on social media.

In July 2026, Wright shared a Daily Mail article on her Instagram that reported she and Gardner had separated. Wright subsequently alleged that Gardner had been unfaithful to her with Australia teammate Georgia Voll.

== Domestic career ==
Following standout performances throughout the 2014–15 Imparja Cup, Gardner made her WNCL debut for New South Wales in the 2015–16 season, and joined the Sydney Sixers for the inaugural WBBL season. In the same summer, she played one T20 and one 50-over game in New Zealand for Northern Districts (not to be confused with one of her local NSW Premier Cricket teams, Northern District Cricket Club).

Gardner enjoyed a breakout 2016–17 season, winning championships with both the Sixers and New South Wales, as well as being named the Young Gun of WBBL|02. Her participation in the WBBL final was impacted as she was forced from the field with heat exhaustion, reportedly as a precaution after a head knock at training two days earlier.

Moving to South Australia for the 2017–18 WNCL season, Gardner played just six games for her new team before returning to her native New South Wales. She began WBBL|03 in commanding fashion with an innings of 114 off 52 balls against the Melbourne Stars at North Sydney Oval, recording the league's fastest half-century and highest individual score. The Sixers went on to claim back-to-back championships, with Gardner contributing 22 not out in the final against the Perth Scorchers at Adelaide Oval. She was cleared to play in the final of the 2018–19 WNCL season, having been a late withdrawal from the previous match due to suffering mild concussion during warm-ups, managing 30 not out with the bat and 2/36 with the ball in the 33-run victory over Queensland.

While fielding during a WBBL|06 match at Drummoyne Oval, Gardner experienced the seventh concussion incident of her professional career and was substituted out of the contest. She subsequently missed the remaining three games of the season. After an underwhelming 2021–22 campaign, Gardner rebounded strongly in WBBL|08 and was named Player of the Tournament—the first time the award was claimed by a past Young Gun winner.

In February 2023, in the inaugural WPL auction, she was bought by Gujarat Giants for ₹3.2 crores.

== International career ==
=== T20I and ODI debut ===
Gardner was named in Australia's squad for a home 2016–17 series against New Zealand, and made her Women's Twenty20 International (WT20I) debut on 17 February at the Melbourne Cricket Ground, but was run out for a golden duck in the 40-run win. She took her first international wicket in the following game of the series, dismissing Amy Satterthwaite via a Kristen Beams catch.

Touring New Zealand with the Australian squad for the 2016–17 Rose Bowl series, Gardner made her Women's One Day International (WODI) debut on 2 March at Bay Oval. She scored 12 not out with the bat, hitting the match-winning runs in her team's four-wicket victory. In June 2017, Gardner became the first Indigenous Australian woman to appear in a cricket World Cup, playing against the West Indies in the 2017 Women's Cricket World Cup. She went on to take eight wickets from as many matches in the tournament, from which Australia was eliminated in the semi-finals.

=== First T20 World Cup title ===
Gardner delivered her first significant contribution with the bat for Australia in the opener of the 2017–18 Women's Ashes. After taking three wickets in the ODI at Allan Border Field, she scored 27 off 18 deliveries late in the run chase to help clinch a narrow two-wicket victory with five balls to spare. Her maiden ODI and T20I half-centuries came a year later in quick succession, both against Pakistan in October 2018.

The following month, Gardner claimed ten wickets from six matches at the ICC Women's World Twenty20 tournament. She took 3/22 and scored 32 not out in the championship decider against England at Sir Vivian Richards Stadium, which Australia won by eight wickets, and was named Player of the Final.

=== Test debut, second T20 World Cup title ===
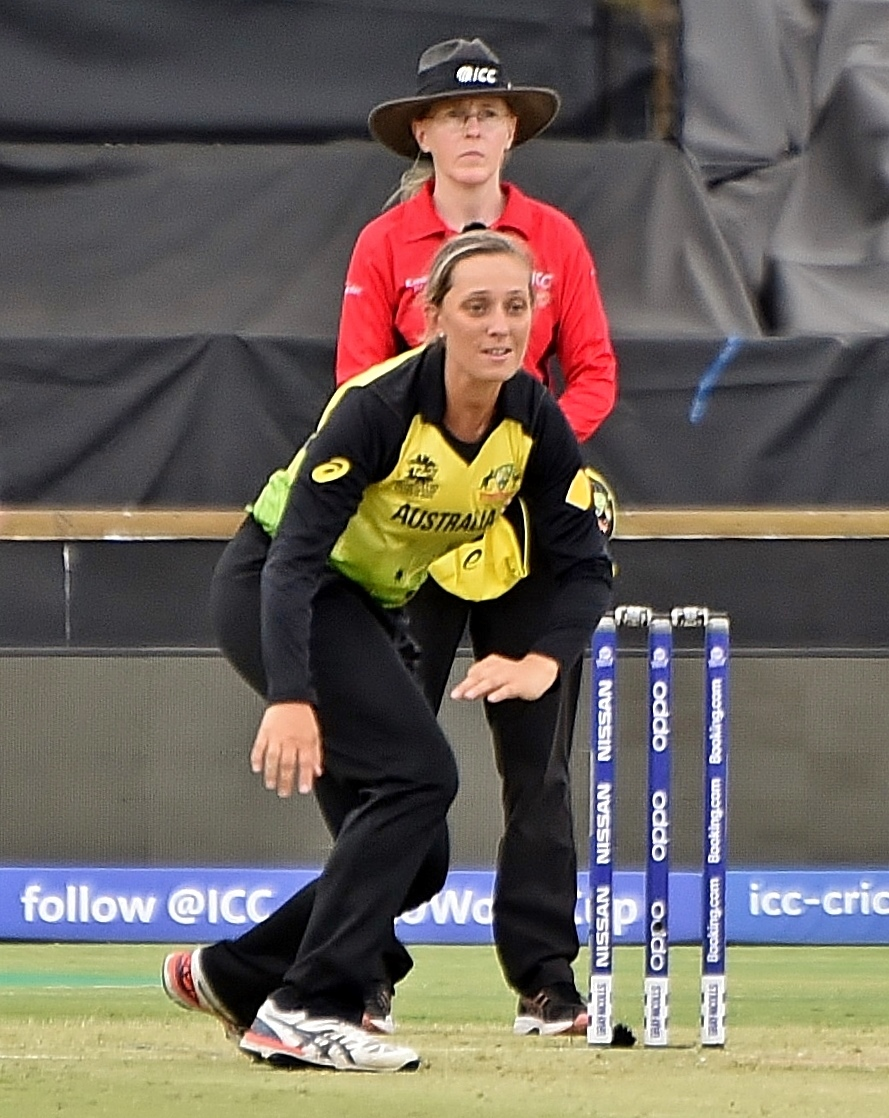
Gardner bowling for Australia during the 2020 ICC Women's T20 World Cup

Gardner made her Test debut in the 2019 Women's Ashes at the County Ground, Taunton. During the drawn match, she became the only woman to get off the mark with a six in all three formats of international cricket, emphasising her aggressive play and powerful striking ability. She also took her maiden Test wicket in the same match, dismissing Katherine Brunt for 15.

In a Tri-Nation Series match against India at the Junction Oval on 8 February 2020, Gardner recorded her highest T20I score, compiling 93 runs from 57 balls despite her team suffering a seven-wicket loss. Later that month, her strongest contribution of the 2020 ICC Women's T20 World Cup occurred against Bangladesh at Manuka Oval via a quickfire innings of 22 not out from just nine balls in an 86-run victory. She then took the winning catch of the tournament's final at the Melbourne Cricket Ground, clinching Australia's second consecutive world championship.

=== Cricket World Cup and Commonwealth Games success ===
Gardner recorded her maiden Test half-century at Carrara Stadium during the 2020–21 multi-format series against India, scoring 51 runs in a drawn match. The following summer, she managed another half-century at Manuka Oval in the only Test of the 2021–22 Women's Ashes, which also ended in a draw.

During a group stage match of the 2022 Women's Cricket World Cup against New Zealand at the Basin Reserve, Gardner played a dominant innings of 48 not out from 18 balls while also taking 3/15, contributing to her team's 141-run victory. She finished the tournament with ten wickets at an average of 19, helping Australia to claim another world championship title.

Gardner made a strong start to the T20I tournament at the 2022 Commonwealth Games, scoring 52 not out off 35 balls against India, ensuring Australia's recovery from 5/49 to successfully chase down a target of 155 with three wickets in hand and an over to spare. She also performed well in the gold medal match, once again meeting India at Edgbaston, scoring 25 from 15 deliveries in the first innings before taking 3/16 from three overs with the ball in a nine-run victory.

On 26 June 2023, Gardner took the match figures of 12 for 165 to give her side an 89-run Ashes Test victory over England at Trent Bridge. She took 8/66 in the second innings, the best bowling figures in Australian women's cricket.

She was named in the Australia squad for the 2024 ICC Women's T20 World Cup and the 2025 Women's Ashes series.

== Honours ==
=== Team ===
Australia

- Women's Cricket World Cup: 2022
- ICC Women's T20 World Cup: 2018, 2020, 2023
- Commonwealth Games gold medal: 2022

New South Wales

- Women's National Cricket League: 2016–17, 2018–19

Sydney Sixers

- Women's Big Bash League: 2016–17, 2017–18

=== Individual ===
- Women's T20 World Cup Player of the Series: 2023
- ICC Women's T20 World Cup Player of the Final: 2018
- Belinda Clark Award: 2022, 2024
- WBBL Player of the Tournament: 2022–23
- WBBL Young Gun Award: 2016–17
- WPL Most Sixes Award: 2025

== See also ==
- List of Indigenous Australian sportspeople
