= Megan Schutt =

Australian cricketer

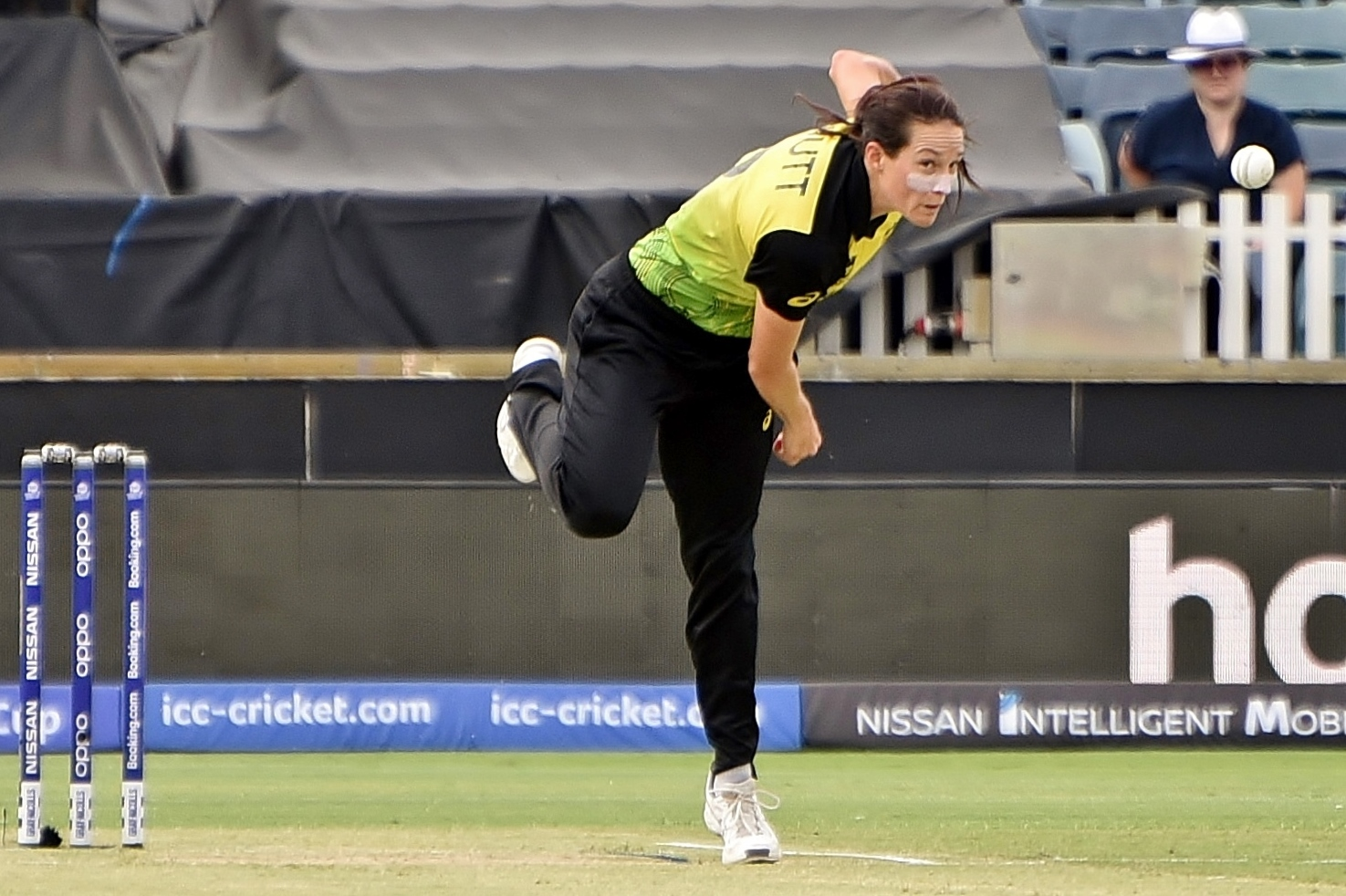
- Schutt bowling for Australia during the 2020 ICC Women's T20 World Cup

Personal information
- Full name: Megan Louise Schutt
- Born: 15 January 1993 (age 33); Adelaide, South Australia
- Nickname: Shooter
- Height: 1.73 m (5 ft 8 in)
- Batting: Right-handed
- Bowling: Right-arm fast-medium
- Role: Bowler

International information
- National side: Australia (2012–present)
- Test debut (cap 166): 11 August 2013 v England
- Last Test: 18 July 2019 v England
- ODI debut (cap 123): 17 December 2012 v New Zealand
- Last ODI: 2 November 2025 v India
- ODI shirt no.: 3
- T20I debut (cap 36): 22 January 2013 v New Zealand
- Last T20I: 26 march 2025 v New Zealand
- T20I shirt no.: 3

Domestic team information
- Years: Team
- 2009/10–present: South Australia (squad no. 27)
- 2014: Nottinghamshire
- 2015/16–present: Adelaide Strikers (squad no. 27)
- 2018: Supernovas (squad no. 27)
- 2022: London Spirit (squad no. 27)
- 2023: Royal Challengers Bangalore (squad no. 27)
- 2025: Birmingham Phoenix

Career statistics
Competition	Test	ODI	T20I	LA
Matches	4	102	123	189
Runs scored	12	110	29	629
Batting average	12.00	6.11	3.22	9.38
100s/50s	0/0	0/0	0/0	0/0
Top score	11	18	8*	33*
Balls bowled	532	4,669	2,503	8,903
Wickets	9	140	151	242
Bowling average	20.11	23.69	17.70	25.30
5 wickets in innings	0	1	1	1
10 wickets in match	0	0	0	0
Best bowling	4/26	5/19	5/15	5/19
Catches/stumpings	2/–	22/–	11/–	52/–
Medal record
Women's Cricket
Representing Australia
Commonwealth Games
Gold medal – first place	2022 Birmingham
World Cup
Winner	2013 India
Winner	2022 New Zealand
T20 World Cup
Winner	2018 West Indies
Winner	2020 Australia
Winner	2023 South Africa
Winner	2026 England
- Source: CricketArchive, 5 October 2025

Megan Louise Schutt (born 15 January 1993) is an Australian cricketer who has played for the Australia women's national team as a fast-medium bowler since 2012. Domestically, she plays for the South Australia, for whom she debuted in 2009, and, since 2015, the Adelaide Strikers. She was the first cricketer to take a hat-trick for Australia in a Women's Twenty20 International (WT20I) match.

== Early life and education ==
Schutt was born in Adelaide, into what she has praised as a "loving family", headed by her parents Brian and Sue. According to Schutt, "I'm 99 per cent my dad; I have my mum's eyes, but that's about it," and, "I thank [my dad] for all my sporting-ness." However, he denies having been any good at sport.

Together with her older sister and her younger brother Warren, Schutt was raised in a modest home in an outer southern suburb of Adelaide. She attended Wirreanda Secondary School, and although she loved school and achieved good grades, she also "wagged a bit".

Children often played cricket in the suburban streets, and Schutt was amongst them. One day when she was 11 years old, she was asked to fill in for someone in a Seaford club match. During that game, she was bowled first ball, but took a wicket with her own first ball. She was also spotted by someone who invited her to join a new girls' team. After being spotted again playing for that team, she was recruited by the Flinders University Cricket Club. Then, at age 13, she moved to Sturt, where her teammates included Shelley Nitschke.

Schutt proceeded along the South Australian state pathway through the under-15, under-17 and under-19 teams. Yet despite being a "fluky good" cricketer as a teenager, she took a long time to fall in love with the game. At 16, she tried boundary umpiring for an Australian rules football league, and was called up to play football for a short time at junior level, but she soon returned to cricket. In 2018, she told Adelaide's Sunday Mail that until she was 19:

"I took things for granted and I had to figure out how lucky I was to be playing a sport amongst really good people and a sport that is an incredible sport, it's so simple yet so complicated. It took me to appreciate everything around me to actually fall in love with the game ... and I'm glad I did."

In an article Schutt wrote for The Guardian in 2021, she observed that as an unexpected by-product of the COVID-19 pandemic she had been able to consider certain issues with more clarity:

"Some of this has been around equality in sport, a belated reflection on my childhood, of being the token girl who played sport at my school and the perception that was normal. Or of growing up believing women's cricket pathways were equal to their men's counterparts when they quite clearly were not."

== Career ==
A right-arm fast-medium bowler, Schutt made her international debut against New Zealand, a match in which she bowled expensively, conceding 33 runs from five overs. She collected two wickets in her next match, against the same opposition, and was rated by ESPNcricinfo's review of women's cricket in 2012 as a player to watch in the following year. She was selected as part of Australia's squad for the 2013 Women's Cricket World Cup, something that ESPNcricinfo's Jenny Roesler suggested was due to Australia's lack of bowlers.

During the World Cup, Schutt appeared in all of Australia's seven matches, claiming 15 wickets at an economy of 4.13. She took at least one wicket in each of the matches, and her 15 were the most by any bowler in the tournament. The Daily Telegraph described her rapid rise from playing club cricket to being the leading bowler in the World Cup as "meteoric", but Schutt explained that the humidity in India favoured her swing bowling. Schutt opened the bowling for Australia in the World Cup final against the West Indies, which her team won by 114 runs; she claimed two wickets for the concession of 38 runs in the match. Her best bowling performance for Australia was the three wickets for 40 runs she claimed in the World Cup group match against New Zealand.

In June 2015, she was named as one of Australia's touring party for the 2015 Women's Ashes in England.

In December 2017, she was named as one of the players in the ICC Women's T20I Team of the Year.

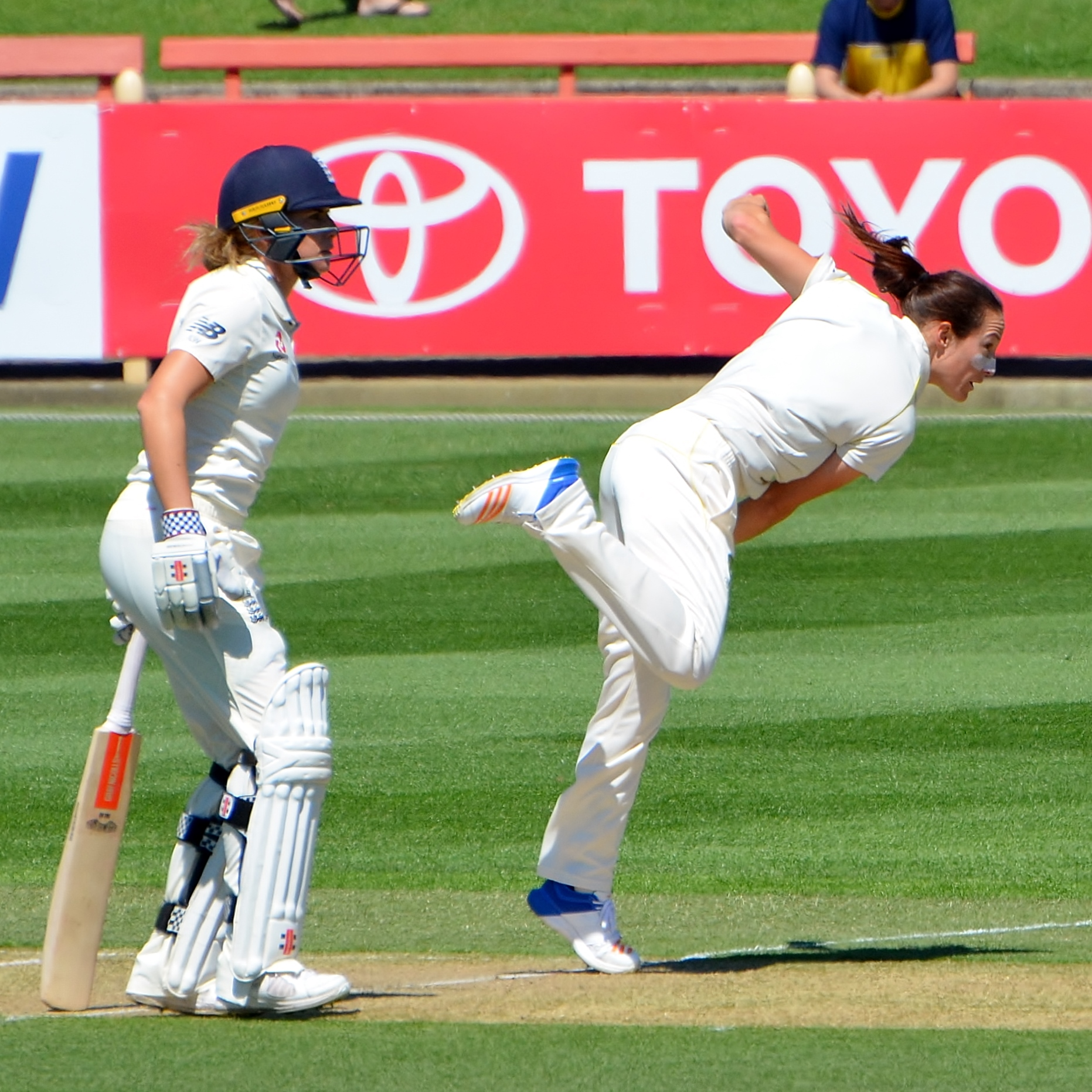
Schutt bowling at the Women's Ashes Test, 2017

In March 2018, during the 2017–18 India women's Tri-Nation Series, Schutt became the first bowler for Australia Women to take a hat-trick in WT20Is. The following month, she was one of the fourteen players to be awarded a national contract for the 2018–19 season by Cricket Australia. In June 2018, Schutt was named as the new captain of the South Australian Scorpions after the previous captain, Tegan McPharlin, chose to step down.

In October 2018, she was named in Australia's squad for the 2018 ICC Women's World Twenty20 tournament in the West Indies. Ahead of the tournament, she was named as one of the players to watch.

In November 2018, she was named in the Adelaide Strikers' squad for the 2018–19 Women's Big Bash League season. In April 2019, Cricket Australia awarded her with a contract ahead of the 2019–20 season. In June 2019, Cricket Australia named her in Australia's team for their tour to England to contest the Women's Ashes. In September 2019, in the third match against the West Indies, Schutt became the first Australian bowler to take a hat-trick in WODIs, and the first female bowler to take two hat-tricks in international cricket. In January 2020, she was named in Australia's squad for the 2020 ICC Women's T20 World Cup in Australia. She finished as the leading wicket taker with 13 wickets in the tournament which also included taking 4/18 in the final.

In January 2022, Schutt was named in Australia's squad for their series against England to contest the Women's Ashes. Later the same month, she was named in Australia's team for the 2022 Women's Cricket World Cup in New Zealand. On 3 February 2022, in the first WODI match of the Women's Ashes, Schutt took her 100th wicket in WODI cricket.

In April 2022, she was bought by the London Spirit for the 2022 season of The Hundred. The following month, Schutt was named in Australia's team for the cricket tournament at the 2022 Commonwealth Games in Birmingham, England. In July 2022, in the 2022 Ireland women's Tri-Nation Series, Schutt took her 100th wicket in WT20I cricket.

She was named in the Australia squad for the 2024 ICC Women's T20 World Cup and the 2025 Women's Ashes series.

== Personal life ==
Schutt's nickname is "Shooter". She came out as lesbian, and married her long-term partner Jess Holyoake in 2019. An early supporter of same-sex marriage in Australia, Schutt stated that "saying partner is nice but when having to explain that it's a woman a lot of the time I think that often gets a reaction which isn't quite comfortable...now we're able to [just] say wife, flat out, and people know that's the deal." In May 2021, Schutt announced that Holyoake was expecting their first child.

In July 2025, Schutt announced on an Instagram post that she and Holyoake were ending their relationship after ten years.
