= 2024–25 Melbourne Stars WBBL season =

Melbourne Stars
2024–25 season
- Melbourne Stars 2022–23 cap logo
- Coach: Jonathan Batty
- Captain(s): Annabel Sutherland
- Home ground: CitiPower Centre
- League: WBBL

The 2024–25 Melbourne Stars Women's season was their 10th season of the Women's Big Bash League. They were coached by Jonathan Batty and captained by Annabel Sutherland. They finished the regular season in 8th place and failed to qualify for the finals.

== Squad ==
The 2024–25 season saw the second WBBL Draft held on 1 September 2024 for overseas players. One international pre-signing per team was allowed to combat availability issues.

- Marizanne Kapp, who played for the Thunder the previous season, was pre-signed by the Stars, while Indian pair Deepti Sharma, who had previously played for the Sydney Thunder, and Yastika Bhatia, were also selected in the draft.
- Annabel Sutherland took over the captaincy from Meg Lanning.
- Maisy Gibson, who made the move from the Hobart Hurricanes, Hasrat Gill, and Ines McKeon, who plays for France internationally, were the domestic players added to their squad.
- Nicole Faltum and Milly Illingworth both departed to the Melbourne Renegades, while English international Alice Capsey also departed to the same club.
- International players Maia Bouchier and Sophia Dunkley did not return to the Stars.

2024-25 Melbourne Stars Squad:

- Players with international caps are listed in **bold**.

No.	Name	Nat.	Birth date	Batting style	Bowling style	Notes
Batters
10	Olivia Henry	(Australia)	27 January 2004	Right-handed	Right-arm off spin	
7	**Meg Lanning**	(Australia)	25 March 1992	Right-handed	Right-arm medium	
All-rounders
25	Tess Flintoff	(Australia)	31 March 2003	Right-handed	Right-arm medium fast	
34	**Kim Garth**	(Australia)	25 April 1996	Right-handed	Right-arm medium fast	
77	**Marizanne Kapp**	(South Africa)	4 January 1990	Right-handed	Right-arm fast	Overseas Draft Pick (Gold)
42	**Deepti Sharma**	(India)	24 August 1997	Left-handed	Right-arm off spin	Overseas Draft Pick (Platinum)
3	**Annabel Sutherland**	(Australia)	12 October 2001	Right-handed	Right-arm medium fast	Captain
Wicket-keepers
19	**Yastika Bhatia**	(India)	1 November 2000	Left-handed	–	Overseas Draft Pick (Silver)
55	**Ines McKeon**	(France)	19 April 2007	Right-handed	–	
20	Sophie Reid	(Australia)	28 August 1997	Left-handed	–	
Bowlers
6	Sophie Day	(Australia)	2 September 1998	Left-handed	Left-arm orthodox spin	
26	Maisy Gibson	(Australia)	14 September 1996	Left-handed	Right-arm leg spin	
18	Hasrat Gill	(Australia)	9 November 2005	Left-handed	Right-arm leg spin	
11	Rhys McKenna	(Australia)	17 August 2004	Right-handed	Left-arm medium fast	
99	Sasha Moloney	(Australia)	14 June 1992	Right-handed	Right-arm off spin	

== Standing ==
Pos	Team	Pld	W	L	T	NR	Pts	NRR	
1	Melbourne Renegades (C)	10	7	3	0	0	14	0.527	Advance to the play-off phase
2	Brisbane Heat (R)	10	7	3	0	0	14	0.384	Advance to the play-off phase
3	Sydney Thunder (3rd)	10	6	3	0	1	13	−0.002	Advance to the play-off phase
4	Hobart Hurricanes (4th)	10	5	5	0	0	10	0.189	Advance to the play-off phase
5	Perth Scorchers	10	4	5	1	0	9	−0.171	
6	Sydney Sixers	10	3	5	1	1	8	−0.477	
7	Adelaide Strikers	10	3	6	0	1	7	−0.357	
8	Melbourne Stars	10	2	7	0	1	5	−0.205	

Source: ESPNcricinfo
(C) Champions; (R) Runners-up
