= 2022–23 Melbourne Stars WBBL season =

Australian cricket team season

Melbourne Stars
2022–23 season
- Melbourne Stars 2022–23 cap logo
- Coach: Jonathan Batty
- Captain(s): Nicole Faltum
- Home ground: CitiPower Centre
- League: WBBL
- Record: 5–6 (6th)
- Finals: DNQ
- Leading Run Scorer: Annabel Sutherland – 304
- Leading Wicket Taker: Annabel Sutherland – 21
- Player of the Season: Annabel Sutherland

The 2022–23 Melbourne Stars Women's season was the eighth in the team's history. Coached by Jonathan Batty and captained by Nicole Faltum, the Stars finished the regular season of WBBL|08 in sixth position and failed to qualify for the finals.

== Squad ==
Each 2022–23 squad was made up of 15 active players. Teams could sign up to five 'marquee players', with a maximum of three of those from overseas. Marquees were classed as any overseas player, or a local player who holds a Cricket Australia national contract at the start of the WBBL|08 signing period.

Personnel changes made ahead of the season included:

- Meg Lanning withdrew from the tournament, having taken indefinite leave from cricket. Nicole Faltum was subsequently appointed captain of the Stars, replacing Lanning.
- Jonathan Batty was appointed head coach of the Stars, replacing Jarrad Loughman.
- Erin Osborne announced her retirement from cricket at the conclusion of the previous season.
- Elyse Villani departed the Stars, signing for the Hobart Hurricanes.
- Maddy Darke departed the Stars, signing for the Perth Scorchers.
- Sasha Moloney signed with the Stars, having previously played for the Hobart Hurricanes.
- English marquees Maia Bouchier and Linsey Smith did not re-sign with the Stars.
- English marquee Alice Capsey signed with the Stars, marking her first appearance in the league.
- English marquee Lauren Winfield-Hill signed with the Stars, having previously played for the Brisbane Heat, Hobart Hurricanes and Adelaide Strikers.
- Indian marquee Jemimah Rodrigues signed with the Stars, having previously played for the Melbourne Renegades.
- Kim Garth, previously an overseas marquee signing, was approved as a local player for the Stars due to her permanent residence in Australia and a lack of recent international cricket appearances for Ireland.
- English marquee Bess Heath signed with the Stars as a replacement player, marking her first appearance in the league.

The table below lists the Stars players and their key stats (including runs scored, batting strike rate, wickets taken, economy rate, catches and stumpings) for the season.

No.	Name	Nat.	Birth date	Batting style	Bowling style	G	R	SR	W	E	C	S	Notes
Batters
21	Bess Heath	(England)	20 August 2001	Right-handed	–	7	128	102.40	–	–	1	–	Overseas marquee (replacement)
10	Olivia Henry	(Australia)	27 January 2004	Right-handed	Right-arm off spin	1	–	–	–	–	1	–	
7	Meg Lanning	(Australia)	25 March 1992	Right-handed	Right-arm medium	–	–	–	–	–	–	–	Australian marquee (unavailable)
18	Una Raymond-Hoey	(Republic of Ireland)	28 October 1996	Right-handed	Right-arm medium	4	0	0.00	–	–	0	–	Replacement player
20	Sophie Reid	(Australia)	28 August 1997	Left-handed	–	14	77	98.71	–	–	2	–	
5	Jemimah Rodrigues	(India)	5 September 2000	Right-handed	Right-arm off spin	7	44	84.61	–	–	1	–	Overseas marquee
58	Lauren Winfield-Hill	(England)	16 August 1990	Right-handed	–	14	254	105.39	–	–	5	–	Overseas marquee
All-rounders
26	Alice Capsey	(England)	11 August 2004	Right-handed	Right-arm off spin	14	259	128.85	9	6.98	4	–	Overseas marquee
24	Lucy Cripps	(Australia)	6 December 2001	Right-handed	Right-arm medium	–	–	–	–	–	–	–	
25	Tess Flintoff	(Australia)	31 March 2003	Right-handed	Right-arm medium fast	11	116	165.71	4	7.51	6	–	
34	Kim Garth	(Republic of Ireland)	25 April 1996	Right-handed	Right-arm medium fast	14	115	83.94	12	6.71	5	–	
3	Annabel Sutherland	(Australia)	12 October 2001	Right-handed	Right-arm medium fast	14	304	113.85	21	8.00	6	–	Australian marquee
Wicket-keepers
4	Nicole Faltum	(Australia)	17 January 2000	Right-handed	–	14	83	97.64	–	–	8	1	Captain
Bowlers
6	Sophie Day	(Australia)	2 September 1998	Left-handed	Left-arm orthodox spin	14	10	200.00	11	6.83	3	–	
	Hasrat Gill	(Australia)	9 November 2005	Left-handed	Right-arm leg spin	–	–	–	–	–	–	–	
11	Rhys McKenna	(Australia)	17 August 2004	Right-handed	Left-arm medium fast	12	12	109.09	3	8.10	3	–	
99	Sasha Moloney	(Australia)	14 June 1992	Right-handed	Right-arm off spin	14	55	114.58	20	6.24	12	–	

== Ladder ==
Pos	Team	Pld	W	L	NR	Pts	NRR
1	Sydney Sixers (RU)	14	11	2	1	23	0.695
2	Adelaide Strikers (C)	14	8	5	1	17	0.390
3	Brisbane Heat (CF)	14	8	5	1	17	0.276
4	Hobart Hurricanes (EF)	14	7	6	1	15	0.457
5	Perth Scorchers	14	6	7	1	13	0.373
6	Melbourne Stars	14	5	6	3	13	−0.339
7	Melbourne Renegades	14	4	9	1	9	−1.042
8	Sydney Thunder	14	1	10	3	5	−1.000

Source: cricket.com.au, ESPN Cricinfo
- The top 4 teams advanced to the play-off phase

== Fixtures ==
All times are AEDT.

Match 4
15 October 2022
19:05 (N)
Scorecard

Brisbane Heat; 3/179 (20 overs)	v	Melbourne Stars; 8/170 (20 overs)
Ellie Johnston 54 (34); Alice Capsey 1/19 (2 overs); Sophie Day 1/19 (2 overs)		Lauren Winfield-Hill 74 (51); Jess Jonassen 3/36 (4 overs)

Brisbane Heat won by 9 runs
Great Barrier Reef Arena, Mackay
Umpires: Claire Polosak and Michael Mellifont
Player of the match: Ellie Johnston (Brisbane Heat)

- Brisbane Heat won the toss and elected to bat.
- Broadcast by Seven Network and Foxtel

Match 6
16 October 2022
13:40
Scorecard

Sydney Sixers; 6/147 (20 overs)	v	Melbourne Stars; 9/120 (20 overs)
Alyssa Healy 43 (32); Kim Garth 2/21 (4 overs)		Bess Heath 37 (30); Maitlan Brown 3/25 (4 overs)

Sydney Sixers won by 27 runs
Great Barrier Reef Arena, Mackay
Umpires: Michael Mellifont and Sue Redfern
Player of the match: Ashleigh Gardner (Sydney Sixers)

- Melbourne Stars won the toss and elected to field.
- Broadcast by Seven Network and Foxtel

Match 11
20 October 2022
20:10 (D/N)
Scorecard

Melbourne Stars; 9/110 (20 overs)	v	Perth Scorchers; 8/111 (19.4 overs)
Tess Flintoff 40* (29); Piepa Cleary 2/8 (2 overs)		Beth Mooney 35 (44); Annabel Sutherland 2/20 (3 overs)

Perth Scorchers won by 2 wickets (with 2 balls remaining)
WACA Ground, Perth
Umpires: Stephen Dionysius and Trent Steenholdt
Player of the match: Beth Mooney (Perth Scorchers)

- Perth Scorchers won the toss and elected to field.
- Broadcast by Seven Network and Foxtel

Match 15
23 October 2022
13:40
Scorecard

Sydney Thunder; 1/102 (13.4 overs)	v	Melbourne Stars
Phoebe Litchfield 50* (34)

No result
WACA Ground, Perth
Umpires: Jamie Thomas and Sue Redfern

- Melbourne Stars won the toss and elected to field.
- Broadcast by Seven Network and Foxtel
- Match reduced to 17 overs due to rain. No further play was possible due to rain.

Match 22
29 October 2022
14:00
Scorecard

Melbourne Renegades; 91 (19 overs)	v	Melbourne Stars; 4/92 (17.3 overs)
Hayley Matthews 24 (24); Sophie Day 4/19 (4 overs)		Annabel Sutherland 42* (48); Shabnim Ismail 1/15 (4 overs)

Melbourne Stars won by 6 wickets (with 15 balls remaining)
Eastern Oval, Ballarat
Umpires: Lisa McCabe and Mattis van Eck
Player of the match: Annabel Sutherland (Melbourne Stars)

- Melbourne Stars won the toss and elected to field.
- Broadcast by cricket.com.au and Foxtel

Match 25
31 October 2022
15:00
Scorecard

Sydney Thunder; 2/79 (13.5 overs)	v	Melbourne Stars
Amy Jones 38 (35); Annabel Sutherland 1/7 (1.5 overs)

No result
Eastern Oval, Ballarat
Umpires: Daryl Brigham and Gaurav Bawa

- Melbourne Stars won the toss and elected to field.
- No further play was possible due to rain.
- Broadcast by cricket.com.au and Foxtel

Match 26
2 November 2022
15:30
Scorecard

Melbourne Stars; 5/186 (20 overs)	v	Adelaide Strikers; 8/164 (20 overs)
Tess Flintoff 51* (16); Deandra Dottin 2/34 (4 overs)		Katie Mack 47 (38); Sasha Moloney 4/24 (4 overs)

Melbourne Stars won by 22 runs
North Sydney Oval, Sydney
Umpires: Bede Sajowitz and Daniel Moran
Player of the match: Tess Flintoff (Melbourne Stars)

- Adelaide Strikers won the toss and elected to field.
- Broadcast by cricket.com.au and Foxtel
- Venue changed from Blacktown ISP Oval to North Sydney Oval
- Tess Flintoff (Melbourne Stars) set a new WBBL record for the fastest half-century (16 balls).

Match 30
5 November 2022
13:00
Scorecard

Melbourne Stars; 8/112 (20 overs)	v	Adelaide Strikers; 5/113 (19.1 overs)
Annabel Sutherland 47 (41); Amanda-Jade Wellington 3/20 (4 overs)		Madeline Penna 56* (50); Annabel Sutherland 2/19 (4 overs)

Adelaide Strikers won by 5 wickets (with 5 balls remaining)
Lilac Hill Park, Perth
Umpires: Ashlee Gibbons and Jarryd Buscall
Player of the match: Madeline Penna (Adelaide Strikers)

- Adelaide Strikers won the toss and elected to field
- Broadcast by cricket.com.au and Foxtel

Match 40
12 November 2022
13:40
Scorecard

Sydney Sixers; 9/160 (20 overs)	v	Melbourne Stars; 115 (19.2 overs)
Alyssa Healy 31 (28); Kim Garth 2/9 (3 overs)		Kim Garth 18 (21); Ashleigh Gardner 4/27 (4 overs)

Sydney Sixers won by 45 runs
CitiPower Centre, Melbourne
Umpires: Lisa McCabe and Stephen Dionysius
Player of the match: Ashleigh Gardner (Sydney Sixers)

- Melbourne Stars won the toss and elected to field.
- Broadcast by Seven Network and Foxtel

Match 43
13 November 2022
13:40
Scorecard

Melbourne Renegades; 8/148 (20 overs)	v	Melbourne Stars; 5/149 (20 overs)
Josie Dooley 54 (46); Sasha Moloney 4/15 (4 overs)		Annabel Sutherland 62* (29); Sarah Coyte 3/22 (4 overs)

Melbourne Stars won by 5 wickets (with 0 balls remaining)
CitiPower Centre, Melbourne
Umpires: Chris Grant and David Taylor
Player of the match: Annabel Sutherland (Melbourne Stars)

- Melbourne Stars won the toss and elected to field.
- Broadcast by Seven Network and Foxtel

In the 15th meeting between the two Melbourne teams—the first to take place in their home city since 30 November 2019—the Renegades lost three early wickets before Josie Dooley and Courtney Webb formed a 50-run partnership from 39 balls. Sarah Coyte hit two sixes off the bowling of Kim Garth in the 20th over, helping to set a target of 149 for victory.

The Stars began the run chase sluggishly, and failed to capitalise on several controversial umpiring decisions in their favour. Alice Capsey survived a close stumping chance but was ultimately dismissed for just eleven, while the Decision Review System overturned an LBW call for Garth who would nevertheless fall to the bowling of Coyte in the following over. Earlier in the innings, Coyte became the eighth player in WBBL history to claim 100 career wickets.

Annabel Sutherland breathed life into the contest as the Stars scored 22 runs from the 14th over against the previously economical Ella Hayward. The Renegades created several opportunities to effectively close out the match but put down key catching chances, which included an error in the field by Shabnim Ismail off her own bowling.

Needing an unlikely 23 runs from six balls to win, Sutherland promptly launched two sixes to dramatically shift the game's momentum. While delivering the third ball of the final over, Renegades captain Sophie Molineux suffered a knee injury which forced her from the field. Georgia Prestwidge was subsequently given the task of finishing the over, having not bowled throughout the innings up to that point. Sutherland proceeded to hit another six, and Stars captain Nicole Faltum then scored one run off the last delivery of the match to clinch her team's sixth win against their crosstown rivals.

Match 46
15 November 2022
15:00
Scorecard

Hobart Hurricanes; 8/130 (20 overs)	v	Melbourne Stars; 6/132 (19.1 overs)
Nicola Carey 31 (33); Annabel Sutherland 3/18 (4 overs)		Alice Capsey 80* (52); Molly Strano 3/17 (4 overs)

Melbourne Stars won by 4 wickets (with 5 balls remaining)
Latrobe Recreation Ground, Latrobe
Umpires: Craig Seabourne and Muhammad Qureshi
Player of the match: Alice Capsey (Melbourne Stars)

- Melbourne Stars won the toss and elected to field.
- Broadcast by cricket.com.au and Foxtel

Match 48
16 November 2022
15:00
Scorecard

Hobart Hurricanes; 7/152 (20 overs)	v	Melbourne Stars; 6/114 (20 overs)
Mignon du Preez 50* (48); Alice Capsey 2/14 (3 overs)		Alice Capsey 38 (26); Hayley Jensen 2/24 (3 overs)

Hobart Hurricanes won by 38 runs
Latrobe Recreation Ground, Latrobe
Umpires: Craig Seabourne and Muhammad Qureshi
Player of the match: Mignon du Preez (Hobart Hurricanes)

- Melbourne Stars won the toss and elected to field.
- Broadcast by cricket.com.au and Foxtel

Match 52
19 November 2022
10:40
Scorecard

Melbourne Stars; 8/179 (20 overs)	v	Perth Scorchers; 7/173 (20 overs)
Lauren Winfield-Hill 36 (25); Amy Edgar 3/27 (4 overs)		Chloe Piparo 34 (27); Alice Capsey 3/37 (4 overs)

Melbourne Stars won by 6 runs
Ted Summerton Reserve, Moe
Umpires: Lisa McCabe and Mattis van Eck
Player of the match: Sasha Moloney (Melbourne Stars)

- Perth Scorchers won the toss and elected to field.
- Broadcast by cricket.com.au and Foxtel

Match 55
20 November 2022
14:00
Scorecard

Brisbane Heat; 4/105 (10 overs)	v	Melbourne Stars; 1/49 (3.5 overs)
Danni Wyatt 52 (24); Sasha Moloney 2/12 (2 overs)		Lauren Winfield-Hill 22* (13); Amelia Kerr 1/4 (0.5 overs)

No result
Ted Summerton Reserve, Moe
Umpires: Chris Grant and Mattis van Eck

- Melbourne Stars won the toss and elected to field.
- Match reduced to 10 overs per side. No further play was possible due to rain.
- Broadcast by cricket.com.au and Foxtel

== Statistics and awards ==
- Most runs: Annabel Sutherland – 304 (11th in the league)
- Highest score in an innings: Alice Capsey – 80* (52) vs Hobart Hurricanes, 15 November 2022
- Most wickets: Annabel Sutherland – 21 (equal 6th in the league)
- Best bowling figures in an innings: Sasha Moloney – 4/15 (4 overs) vs Melbourne Renegades, 13 November 2022
- Most catches (fielder): Sasha Moloney – 12 (equal 2nd in the league)
- Player of the Match awards:
  - Annabel Sutherland – 2
  - Alice Capsey, Tess Flintoff, Sasha Moloney – 1 each
- WBBL|08 Player of the Tournament: Annabel Sutherland (equal 9th)
- WBBL|08 Team of the Tournament: Annabel Sutherland
- WBBL|08 Young Gun Award: Tess Flintoff
- Stars Player of the Season: Annabel Sutherland
