= 2024–25 Women's Big Bash League season =

Cricket tournament

2024–25 Women's Big Bash League
- Dates: 27 October 2024 – 1 December 2024
- Administrator: Cricket Australia
- Cricket format: Twenty20
- Tournament format(s): Double round-robin and knockout finals
- Champions: Melbourne Renegades (1st title)
- Runners-up: Brisbane Heat
- Participants: 8
- Matches: 43
- Player of the series: Ellyse Perry (SYS) & Jess Jonassen (BRH)
- Most runs: Ellyse Perry (SYS) – 424
- Most wickets: Alana King (PRS) – 20; Samantha Bates (SYT) – 20
- Official website: WBBL

The 2024–25 Women's Big Bash League season or WBBL|10 (also known as Weber Women's Big Bash League 2024 for sponsorship reasons) was the 10th season of the Women's Big Bash League (WBBL), the semi-professional women's Twenty20 domestic cricket competition in Australia. The tournament started on 27 October 2024, with the Melbourne Renegades victorious in the final held on 1 December 2024. Adelaide Strikers were the defending champions.

== Background ==
On 9 July 2024, it was announced that the 10th season of the tournament would begin on 27 October 2024, seven days after the conclusion of the 2024 ICC Women's T20 World Cup.

In July 2024, Cricket Australia introduced a new domestic Twenty20 Cricket event, called T20 Spring Challenge, that forms part of the Australia domestic cricket season. The league was aimed to make up for the absence of high-profile matches in Australia every year and to expose talented players from Country. The new nine-team T20 features teams aligned with the eight Big Bash clubs along with the ACT Meteors. The T20 Spring Challenge bascially acts as a preseason tournament for the WBBL, with the inaugural winners being Hobart Hurricanes.

== Draft ==
The 2024–25 season players draft was held on 1 September 2024.

Table of international draft selections
Team	Round	Pick	Player	National team	Notes
Adelaide Strikers	1	6	Laura Wolvaardt	South Africa	Retention Pick
Adelaide Strikers	2	14	Passed		
Adelaide Strikers	3	22	Smriti Mandhana	India	Pre-signed player
Adelaide Strikers	4	27	Orla Prendergast	Ireland	
Brisbane Heat	1	7	Jemimah Rodrigues	India	
Brisbane Heat	2	15	Shikha Pandey	India	
Brisbane Heat	3	18	Passed		
Brisbane Heat	4	31	Nadine de Klerk	South Africa	Pre-signed player
Hobart Hurricanes	1	1	Danni Wyatt	England	
Hobart Hurricanes	2	9	Chloe Tryon	South Africa	
Hobart Hurricanes	3	24	Lizelle Lee	South Africa	Pre-signed player
Hobart Hurricanes	4	25	Passed		
Melbourne Renegades	1	3	Deandra Dottin	West Indies	
Melbourne Renegades	2	11	Hayley Matthews	West Indies	Pre-signed player
Melbourne Renegades	3	19	Alice Capsey	England	
Melbourne Renegades	4	30	Passed		
Melbourne Stars	1	4	Deepti Sharma	India	
Melbourne Stars	2	12	Marizanne Kapp	South Africa	Pre-signed player
Melbourne Stars	3	21	Yastika Bhatia	India	
Melbourne Stars	4	28	Passed		
Perth Scorchers	1	8	Sophie Devine	New Zealand	Pre-signed player
Perth Scorchers	2	16	Amy Jones	England	
Perth Scorchers	3	17	Dayalan Hemalatha	India	
Perth Scorchers	4	32	Passed		
Sydney Sixers	1	2	Sophie Ecclestone	England	Retention Pick
Sydney Sixers	2	10	Amelia Kerr	New Zealand	Pre-signed player
Sydney Sixers	3	23	Passed		
Sydney Sixers	4	26	Hollie Armitage	England	
Sydney Thunder	1	5	Heather Knight	England	Retention Pick
Sydney Thunder	2	13	Shabnim Ismail	South Africa	
Sydney Thunder	3	20	Chamari Athapaththu	Sri Lanka	Pre-signed player
Sydney Thunder	4	29	Georgia Adams	England	

== Teams and squads ==
Team	Coach	Captain	Australian representatives	Overseas players (Note: Player signed directly by their team, rather than entering the draft.) (Note: Replacement player) (Note: Associate rookie) (Note: Unavailable for the season)
Adelaide; Strikers	Luke Williams	Tahlia McGrath	Darcie Brown; Tahlia McGrath; Megan Schutt; Amanda-Jade Wellington	Smriti Mandhana; Laura Wolvaardt; Orla Prendergast
Brisbane; Heat	Mark Sorell	Jess Jonassen	Grace Harris; Jess Jonassen	Nadine de Klerk; Jemimah Rodrigues; Shikha Pandey; Lauren Winfield-Hill
Hobart; Hurricanes	Jude Coleman	Elyse Villani	Nicola Carey; Heather Graham; Molly Strano; Elyse Villani	Lizelle Lee; Chloe Tryon; Danni Wyatt; Suzie Bates; Kathryn Bryce
Melbourne; Renegades	Simon Helmot	Sophie Molineux (Note: Hayley Matthews stood in as acting for four games)	Sarah Coyte; Sophie Molineux; Naomi Stalenberg; Tayla Vlaeminck; Georgia Wareham	Hayley Matthews; Deandra Dottin; Alice Capsey; Linsey Smith; Tara Norris
Melbourne; Stars	Jonathan Batty	Annabel Sutherland	Kim Garth; Meg Lanning; Annabel Sutherland	Marizanne Kapp; Deepti Sharma; Yastika Bhatia; Ines McKeon
Perth; Scorchers	Becky Grundy	Sophie Devine (Note: Beth Mooney stood in as acting for one game)	Stella Campbell Alana King	Sophie Devine; Amy Jones; Dayalan Hemalatha; Ni Made Putri Suwandewi; Brooke Halliday
Sydney; Sixers	Charlotte Edwards	Ellyse Perry	Alyssa Healy; Ellyse Perry; Ashleigh Gardner; Erin Burns; Maitlan Brown	Amelia Kerr; Sophie Ecclestone; Hollie Armitage; Sarah Bryce
Sydney; Thunder	Lisa Keightley	Phoebe Litchfield	Hannah Darlington; Phoebe Litchfield	Chamari Athapaththu; Heather Knight; Shabnim Ismail; Georgia Adams

=== Squads ===
Adelaide Strikers
- Jemma Barsby
- Darcie Brown
- Ellie Johnston
- Eleanor Larosa
- Katie Mack
- Smriti Mandhana
- Anesu Mushangwe
- Tahlia McGrath
- Bridget Patterson
- Madeline Penna
- Orla Prendergast
- Megan Schutt
- Amanda-Jade Wellington
- Laura Wolvaardt
- Maggie Clark
Brisbane Heat
- Bonnie Berry
- Nadine de Klerk
- Sianna Ginger
- Lucy Hamilton
- Nicola Hancock
- Grace Harris
- Laura Harris
- Jess Jonassen
- Charli Knott
- Shikha Pandey
- Grace Parsons
- Georgia Redmayne
- Jemimah Rodrigues
- Mikayla Wrigley
- Lauren Winfield-Hill
- Ruby Strange
- Lucy Bourke
Hobart Hurricanes
- Nicola Carey
- Zoe Cooke
- Heather Graham
- Ruth Johnston
- Lizelle Lee
- ~~Hayley Silver-Holmes~~
- Amy Smith
- Lauren Smith
- Molly Strano
- ~~Rachel Trenaman~~
- Chloe Tryon
- Elyse Villani
- Callie Wilson
- Tabatha Saville
- Danni Wyatt
- Suzie Bates
- Kathryn Bryce
Melbourne Renegades
- Alice Capsey
- Sarah Coyte
- Emma de Broughe
- Josie Dooley
- Deandra Dottin
- Nicole Faltum
- Ella Hayward
- Milly Illingworth
- Hayley Matthews
- Sophie Molineux
- Georgia Prestwidge
- Naomi Stalenberg
- ~~Tayla Vlaeminck~~
- Georgia Wareham
- Courtney Webb
- Tara Norris
- Linsey Smith
- Sara Kennedy
Melbourne Stars
- Yastika Bhatia
- Sophie Day
- Tess Flintoff
- Kim Garth
- Maisy Gibson
- Marizanne Kapp
- Meg Lanning
- Sasha Moloney
- Sophie Reid
- Deepti Sharma
- Annabel Sutherland
- Rhys McKenna
- Ines McKeon
- Hasrat Gill
- Liv Henry
Perth Scorchers
- Chloe Ainsworth
- Stella Campbell
- ~~Piepa Cleary~~
- Maddy Darke
- Sophie Devine
- Amy Edgar
- Dayalan Hemalatha
- Mikayla Hinkley
- Amy Jones
- Alana King
- Lilly Mills
- Beth Mooney
- Chloe Piparo
- Carly Leeson
- Ebony Hoskin
- Ni Made Putri Suwandewi
Sydney Sixers
- Hollie Armitage
- Maitlan Brown
- Erin Burns
- Mathilda Carmichael
- Lauren Cheatle
- Sophie Ecclestone
- Ashleigh Gardner
- Alyssa Healy
- Amelia Kerr
- Kate Pelle
- Ellyse Perry
- Kate Peterson
- Courtney Sippel
- Isabella Malgioglio
- Caoimhe Bray
- Sarah Bryce
- Elsa Hunter
- Frankie Nicklin
Sydney Thunder
- Georgia Adams
- Chamari Athapaththu
- Samantha Bates
- Hannah Darlington
- Sienna Eve
- Saskia Horley
- Shabnim Ismail
- Heather Knight
- Anika Learoyd
- Phoebe Litchfield
- Claire Moore
- Taneale Peschel
- Georgia Voll
- Tahlia Wilson
- Sammy-Jo Johnson
- Ella Briscoe

== Venues ==
- Adelaide Oval, Adelaide
- Karen Rolton Oval, Adelaide
- Allan Border Field, Brisbane
- The Gabba, Brisbane
- Drummoyne Oval, Sydney
- Bellerive Oval, Hobart
- CitiPower Centre, Melbourne
- Melbourne Cricket Ground, Melbourne
- WACA Ground, Perth
- North Sydney Oval, Sydney
- Sydney Cricket Ground, Sydney

== Teams and standings ==
=== Points table ===
Pos	Team	Pld	W	L	T	NR	Pts	NRR	
1	Melbourne Renegades (C)	10	7	3	0	0	14	0.527	Advance to the play-off phase
2	Brisbane Heat (R)	10	7	3	0	0	14	0.384	Advance to the play-off phase
3	Sydney Thunder (3rd)	10	6	3	0	1	13	−0.002	Advance to the play-off phase
4	Hobart Hurricanes (4th)	10	5	5	0	0	10	0.189	Advance to the play-off phase
5	Perth Scorchers	10	4	5	1	0	9	−0.171	
6	Sydney Sixers	10	3	5	1	1	8	−0.477	
7	Adelaide Strikers	10	3	6	0	1	7	−0.357	
8	Melbourne Stars	10	2	7	0	1	5	−0.205	

Source: ESPNcricinfo
(C) Champions; (R) Runners-up

=== Win–loss table ===
Below is a summary of results for each team's ten regular season matches, plus finals where applicable, in chronological order. A team's opponent for any given match is listed above the margin of victory/defeat.

Team	1	2	3	4	5	6	7	8	9	10	K	C	F	Pos.
Adelaide; Strikers (ADS)	BRH; 4 wickets	SYS; 11 runs	SYT; 64 runs	MLR; 2 wickets	BRH; 8 runs	MLR; 9 wickets	HBH; 28 runs	HBH; 38 runs	PRS; 30 runs	MLS; N/R	X	X	X	7th
Brisbane; Heat (BRH)	ADS; 4 wickets	MLR; 28 runs	HBH; 7 wickets	PRS; 28 runs	SYT; 19 runs	ADS; 8 runs	SYS; 12 runs	MLS; 6 wickets	MLS; 9 wickets	SYS; 5 wickets	→	SYT; 9 wickets	MLR; 7 runs (DLS)	2nd (RU)
Hobart; Hurricanes (HBH)	SYT; 31 runs	SYT; 33 runs	BRH; 7 wickets	MLS; 7 wickets	SYS; 6 runs	PRS; 72 runs	ADS; 28 runs	ADS; 38 runs	MLR; 22 runs	PRS; 3 wickets	SYT; 6 wickets	X	X	4th (4th)
Melbourne; Renegades (MLR)	SYS; 3 wickets	BRH; 28 runs	PRS; 6 wickets	ADS; 2 wickets	PRS; 2 runs	MLS; 15 runs	ADS; 9 wickets	MLS; 9 runs	HBH; 22 runs	SYT; 9 wickets	→	→	BRH; 7 runs (DLS)	1st (C)
Melbourne; Stars (MLS)	PRS; 13 runs	SYS; 32 runs (DLS)	HBH; 7 wickets	SYS; 6 runs (DLS)	MLR; 15 runs	MLR; 9 runs	BRH; 6 wickets	SYT; 4 wickets	BRH; 9 wickets	ADS; N/R	X	X	X	8th
Perth; Scorchers (PRS)	MLS; 13 runs	MLR; 6 wickets	BRH; 28 runs	MLR; 2 runs	HBH; 72 runs	SYT; 74 runs	SYT; 7 wickets	ADS; 30 runs	SYS; Tied	HBH; 3 wickets	X	X	X	5th
Sydney; Sixers (SYS)	MLR; 3 wickets	ADS; 11 runs	MLS; 32 runs (DLS)	HBH; 6 runs	MLS; 6 runs (DLS)	SYT; 18 runs	BRH; 12 runs	SYT; N/R	PRS; Tied	BRH; 5 wickets	X	X	X	6th
Sydney; Thunder (SYT)	HBH; 31 runs	HBH; 33 runs	ADS; 64 runs	BRH; 19 runs	SYS; 18 runs	PRS; 74 runs	PRS; 7 wickets	SYS; N/R	MLS; 4 wickets	MLR; 9 wickets	HBH; 6 wickets	BRH; 9 wickets	X	3rd (3rd)

Team's results→	Won	Tied	Lost	N/R

=== League progression ===
Team	Group matches										Playoffs		
Team	1	2	3	4	5	6	7	8	9	10	K	C	F
Adelaide Strikers	0	2	2	2	2	2	2	4	6	7			
Brisbane Heat	2	4	4	4	4	6	8	10	12	14		W	L
Hobart Hurricanes	2	2	4	4	4	6	8	8	8	10	L		
Melbourne Renegades	0	0	2	4	4	6	8	10	12	14			W
Melbourne Stars	0	2	4	4	4	4	4	4	4	5			
Perth Scorchers	2	2	4	6	6	8	8	8	9	9			
Sydney Sixers	2	2	2	4	6	6	6	7	8	8			
Sydney Thunder	0	2	4	6	8	8	10	11	13	13	W	L	

Win	Loss	No result

- Note: The total points at the end of each group match are listed.
- Note: Click on the points (group matches) or W/L (playoffs) to see the match summary.

=== Summary ===
Visitor team →	ADS	BRH	HBH	MLR	MLS	PRS	SYS	SYT
Home team ↓	ADS	BRH	HBH	MLR	MLS	PRS	SYS	SYT
Adelaide Strikers		Heat; 4 wickets	Strikers; 38 runs	Renegades; 9 wickets		Strikers; 30 runs		Thunder; 64 runs
Brisbane Heat	Heat; 8 runs		Hurricanes; 7 wickets	Heat; 28 runs	Heat; 9 runs		Heat; 5 wickets	
Hobart Hurricanes	Hurricanes; 28 runs			Renegades; 22 runs		Hurricanes; 72 runs	Sixers; 6 runs	Hurricanes; 31 runs
Melbourne Renegades	Renegades; 2 wickets				Renegades; 15 runs	Renegades; 6 wickets	Sixers; 3 wickets	Renegades; 9 wickets
Melbourne Stars	Match abandoned	Heat; 6 wickets	Stars; 7 wickets	Renegades; 9 runs			Sixers; 6 runs (D/L)	
Perth Scorchers		Scorchers; 28 runs	Hurricanes; 3 wickets	Scorchers; 2 runs	Scorchers; 13 runs			Thunder; 7 wickets
Sydney Sixers	Strikers; 11 runs	Heat; 12 runs			Stars; 32 runs (D/L)	Match tied		Thunder; 18 runs
Sydney Thunder		Thunder; 19 runs	Thunder; 33 runs		Thunder; 4 wickets	Scorchers; 74 runs	Match abandoned	

Home team won	Visitor team won

- Note: Results listed are according to the home (horizontal) and visitor (vertical) teams.
- Note: Click on a result to see a summary of the match.
- MATCH REPORT
  - 1 2 3 4 5 6 7 8 9 10 11 12 13 14 15 16 17 18 19 20 21 22 23 24 25 26 27 28 29 30 31 32 33 34 35 36 37 38 40 K C F

== League stage ==
On 9 July 2024, Cricket Australia confirmed the full schedule for the tournament.

Match 1
27 October 2024
13:10 UTC+10:30
Scorecard

Adelaide Strikers; 5/133 (20 overs)	v	Brisbane Heat; 6/134 (18 overs)
Tahlia McGrath 51* (41); Shikha Pandey 2/14 (4 overs)		Charli Knott 44* (30); Megan Schutt 2/27 (4 overs)

Brisbane Heat won by 4 wickets
Adelaide Oval, Adelaide
Umpires: Eloise Sheridan (Aus) and Mary Waldron (Ire)
Player of the match: Charli Knott (Brisbane Heat)

- Brisbane Heat won the toss and elected to field.

Match 2
27 October 2024
16:40 UTC+10:30 (D/N)
Scorecard

Melbourne Renegades; 8/178 (20 overs)	v	Sydney Sixers; 7/179 (19 overs)
Georgia Wareham 61 (31); Ellyse Perry 2/25 (4 overs)		Ellyse Perry 81 (38); Georgia Wareham 3/26 (3 overs)

Sydney Sixers won by 3 wickets
Adelaide Oval, Adelaide
Umpires: Eloise Sheridan (Aus) and Peter George (Aus)
Player of the match: Ellyse Perry (Sydney Sixers)

- Sydney Sixers won the toss and elected to field.

Match 3
27 October 2024
17:30 UTC+8 (D/N)
Scorecard

Perth Scorchers; 8/122 (20 overs)	v	Melbourne Stars; 109 (19.2 overs)
Beth Mooney 31 (27); Sophie Day 3/21 (4 overs)		Ines McKeon 50 (43); Alana King 3/20 (3.2 overs)

Perth Scorchers won by 13 runs
WACA Ground, Perth
Umpires: Greg Davidson (Aus) and Donovan Koch (Aus)
Player of the match: Chloe Ainsworth (Perth Scorchers)

- Melbourne Stars won the toss and elected to field.

Match 4
28 October 2024
18:10 UTC+11 (N)
Scorecard

Hobart Hurricanes; 7/141 (20 overs)	v	Sydney Thunder; 110 (18 overs)
Nicola Carey 52 (38); Samantha Bates 3/20 (4 overs)		Phoebe Litchfield 51 (37); Heather Graham 3/19 (4 overs)

Hobart Hurricanes won by 31 runs
Bellerive Oval, Hobart
Umpires: Daryl Brigham (Aus) and Michael Graham-Smith (Aus)
Player of the match: Nicola Carey (Hobart Hurricanes)

- Sydney Thunder won the toss and elected to field.

Match 5
29 October 2024
18:10 UTC+11 (N)
Scorecard

Adelaide Strikers; 171 (20 overs)	v	Sydney Sixers; 9/160 (20 overs)
Bridget Patterson 44 (32); Ashleigh Gardner 4/32 (4 overs)		Sarah Bryce 62 (44); Anesu Mushangwe 3/27 (4 overs)

Adelaide Strikers won by 11 runs
North Sydney Oval, Sydney
Umpires: Roberto Howard (Aus) and Sharad Patel (Aus)
Player of the match: Amanda-Jade Wellington (Adelaide Strikers)

- Sydney Sixers won the toss and elected to field.

Match 6
30 October 2024
18:10 UTC+10 (N)
Scorecard

Brisbane Heat; 8/169 (20 overs)	v	Melbourne Renegades; 9/141 (20 overs)
Georgia Redmayne 44 (39); Hayley Matthews 2/21 (3 overs)		Naomi Stalenberg 38 (23); Grace Parsons 3/22 (4 overs)

Brisbane Heat won by 28 runs
Allan Border Field, Brisbane
Umpires: Stephen Dionysius (Aus) and Riki Wessels (Eng)
Player of the match: Grace Parsons (Brisbane Heat)

- Melbourne Renegades won the toss and elected to field.

Match 7
31 October 2024
19:15 UTC+11 (N)
Scorecard

Sydney Thunder; 5/146 (17 overs)	v	Hobart Hurricanes; 8/113 (17 overs)
Heather Knight 48 (28); Heather Graham 2/22 (3 overs)		Heather Graham 31 (20); Hannah Darlington 3/16 (4 overs)

Sydney Thunder won by 33 runs
North Sydney Oval, Sydney
Umpires: Bede Sajowitz (Aus) and S Patel (Ind)
Player of the match: Heather Knight (Sydney Thunder)

- Hobart Hurricanes won the toss and elected to field.
- Match reduced to 17 overs per side due to rain.

Match 8
1 November 2024
15:45 UTC+11 (D/N)
Scorecard

Sydney Thunder; 5/212 (20 overs)	v	Adelaide Strikers; 148 (19.2 overs)
Georgia Voll 92 (55); Orla Prendergast 3/35 (4 overs)		Katie Mack 51 (42); Samantha Bates 4/21 (4 overs)

Sydney Thunder won by 64 runs
North Sydney Oval, Sydney
Umpires: Mitchell Claydon (Aus) and Roberto Howard (Aus)
Player of the match: Georgia Voll (Sydney Thunder)

- Sydney Thunder won the toss and elected to bat.

Match 9
1 November 2024
19:15 UTC+11 (N)
Scorecard

Melbourne Stars; 4/195 (20 overs)	v	Sydney Sixers; 4/56 (8.3 overs)
Meg Lanning 58* (36); Caoimhe Bray 1/33 (4 overs)		Ellyse Perry 31* (25); Kim Garth 1/9 (1 over); Annabel Sutherland 1/9 (1 over)

Melbourne Stars won by 32 runs (DLS method)
North Sydney Oval, Sydney
Umpires: Mitchell Claydon (Aus) and Roberto Howard (Aus)
Player of the match: Rhys McKenna (Melbourne Stars)

- Melbourne Stars won the toss and elected to bat.
- No further play was possible due to rain.
- Sydney Sixers were 32 runs behind of the DLS par score of 88 from 8.3 overs.

Match 10
2 November 2024
11:30 UTC+11
Scorecard

Brisbane Heat; 5/173 (20 overs)	v	Hobart Hurricanes; 3/176 (19.4 overs)
Grace Harris 75 (57); Kathryn Bryce 2/22 (3 overs)		Danni Wyatt-Hodge 62 (35); Nadine de Klerk 1/9 (1 over)

Hobart Hurricanes won by 7 wickets
CitiPower Centre, Melbourne
Umpires: Daryl Brigham (Aus) and Chris Grant (Aus)
Player of the match: Danni Wyatt-Hodge (Hobart Hurricanes)

- Brisbane Heat won the toss and elected to bat.

Match 11
2 November 2024
15:00 UTC+11 (D/N)
Scorecard

Perth Scorchers; 140 (19.4 overs)	v	Melbourne Renegades; 4/145 (17.4 overs)
Beth Mooney 36 (25); Sophie Molineux 4/17 (4 overs)		Courtney Webb 61 (40); Alana King 2/35 (3.4 overs)

Melbourne Renegades won by 6 wickets
CitiPower Centre, Melbourne
Umpires: Daryl Brigham (Aus) and Chris Grant (Aus)
Player of the match: Hayley Matthews (Melbourne Renegades)

- Perth Scorchers won the toss and elected to bat.

Match 12
3 November 2024
10:10 UTC+11
Scorecard

Hobart Hurricanes; 7/133 (20 overs)	v	Melbourne Stars; 3/136 (17.5 overs)
Nicola Carey 44 (43); Kim Garth 2/21 (3 overs)		Yastika Bhatia 57 (46); Heather Graham 2/30 (4 overs)

Melbourne Stars won by 7 wickets
CitiPower Centre, Melbourne
Umpires: Clare Haysom (Aus) and Lisa McCabe (Aus)
Player of the match: Yastika Bhatia (Melbourne Stars)

- Hobart Hurricanes won the toss and elected to bat.

Match 13
3 November 2024
13:40 UTC+11
Scorecard

Adelaide Strikers; 5/157 (20 overs)	v	Melbourne Renegades; 8/158 (20 overs)
Tahlia McGrath 64* (44); Sophie Molineux 2/39 (4 overs)		Sophie Molineux 64 (32); Jemma Barsby 2/17 (3 overs)

Melbourne Renegades won by 2 wickets
CitiPower Centre, Melbourne
Umpires: Clare Haysom (Aus) and Lisa McCabe (Aus)
Player of the match: Sophie Molineux (Melbourne Renegades)

- Adelaide Strikers won the toss and elected to bat.

Match 14
5 November 2024
17:10 UTC+8 (D/N)
Scorecard

Perth Scorchers; 8/142 (20 overs)	v	Brisbane Heat; 114 (18 overs)
Beth Mooney 77 (52); Nicola Hancock 3/23 (4 overs)		Laura Harris 40 (21); Alana King 5/16 (4 overs)

Perth Scorchers won by 28 runs
WACA Ground, Perth
Umpires: Ashlee Gibbons (Aus) and Jamie Thomas (Aus)
Player of the match: Beth Mooney (Perth Scorchers)

- Brisbane Heat won the toss and elected to field.

Match 15
6 November 2024
18:10 UTC+11 (N)
Scorecard

Sydney Sixers; 7/155 (20 overs)	v	Hobart Hurricanes; 9/149 (20 overs)
Ellyse Perry 86 (62); Nicola Carey 2/27 (3 overs)		Danni Wyatt-Hodge 30 (26); Caoimhe Bray 2/13 (3 overs)

Sydney Sixers won by 6 runs
Bellerive Oval, Hobart
Umpires: Simon Burns (Aus) and Phillip Gillespie (Aus)
Player of the match: Ellyse Perry (Sydney Sixers)

- Hobart Hurricanes won the toss and elected to field.

Match 16
7 November 2024
14:05 UTC+8
Scorecard

Sydney Thunder; 5/170 (20 overs)	v	Brisbane Heat; 151 (19.1 overs)
Heather Knight 59* (34); Jess Jonassen 3/22 (4 overs)		Charli Knott 55 (37); Samantha Bates 4/25 (4 overs)

Sydney Thunder won by 19 runs
WACA Ground, Perth
Umpires: Ashlee Gibbons (Aus) and Kate Holloman (Aus)
Player of the match: Samantha Bates (Sydney Thunder)

- Brisbane Heat won the toss and elected to field.

Match 17
7 November 2024
17:35 UTC+8 (D/N)
Scorecard

Perth Scorchers; 108 (19.5 overs)	v	Melbourne Renegades; 8/106 (20 overs)
Mikayla Hinkley 32 (37); Alice Capsey 5/25 (3.5 overs)		Deandra Dottin 40 (27); Alana King 3/23 (4 overs)

Perth Scorchers won by 2 runs
WACA Ground, Perth
Umpires: Ashlee Gibbons (Aus) and Kate Holloman (Aus)
Player of the match: Alana King (Perth Scorchers)

- Melbourne Renegades won the toss and elected to field.

Match 18
8 November 2024
11:00 UTC+11
Scorecard

Melbourne Stars; 7/122 (18 overs)	v	Sydney Sixers; 1/104 (15 overs)
Annabel Sutherland 42 (36); Sophie Ecclestone 3/18 (4 overs)		Ellyse Perry 48* (44); Kim Garth 1/8 (2 overs)

Sydney Sixers won by 6 runs (DLS method)
CitiPower Centre, Melbourne
Umpires: Daryl Brigham (Aus) and Lisa McCabe (Aus)
Player of the match: Amelia Kerr (Sydney Sixers)

- Sydney Sixers won the toss and elected to field.
- Match reduced to 18 overs per side due to rain.
- No further play was possible due to rain.
- Sydney Sixers were 6 runs ahead of the DLS par score of 98 from 15 overs.

Match 19
9 November 2024
15:00 UTC+11
Scorecard

Melbourne Renegades; 6/146 (20 overs)	v	Melbourne Stars; 9/131 (20 overs)
Alice Capsey 33 (15); Marizanne Kapp 2/22 (4 overs)		Deepti Sharma 23 (20); Milly Illingworth 1/8 (2 overs)

Melbourne Renegades won by 15 runs
CitiPower Centre, Melbourne
Umpires: Chris Grant (Aus) and Clare Haysom (Aus)
Player of the match: Charis Bekker (Melbourne Renegades)

- Melbourne Stars won the toss and elected to field.

Match 20
9 November 2024
18:15 UTC+10 (N)
Scorecard

Brisbane Heat; 6/175 (20 overs)	v	Adelaide Strikers; 4/167 (20 overs)
Jemimah Rodrigues 61 (40); Jemma Barsby 2/34 (4 overs)		Bridget Patterson 61* (47); Nadine de Klerk 1/6 (1 over)

Brisbane Heat won by 8 runs
The Gabba, Brisbane
Umpires: Stephen Dionysius (Aus) and Riki Wessels (Eng)
Player of the match: Jemimah Rodrigues (Brisbane Heat)

- Adelaide Strikers won the toss and elected to field.

Match 21
10 November 2024
10:10 UTC+11
Scorecard

Hobart Hurricanes; 3/203 (20 overs)	v	Perth Scorchers; 131 (19.3 overs)
Lizelle Lee 150* (75); Chloe Ainsworth 2/17 (4 overs)		Chloe Ainsworth 41 (27); Heather Graham 3/24 (4 overs)

Hobart Hurricanes won by 72 runs
Sydney Cricket Ground, Sydney
Umpires: Sharad Patel (Aus) and Troy Penman (Aus)
Player of the match: Lizelle Lee (Hobart Hurricanes)

- Perth Scorchers won the toss and elected to field.
- Lizelle Lee scored the highest individual score in the Women's Big Bash League.

Match 22
10 November 2024
13:40 UTC+11
Scorecard

Sydney Thunder; 6/158 (20 overs)	v	Sydney Sixers; 140 (19.4 overs)
Heather Knight 50 (31); Amelia Kerr 2/23 (3 overs)		Ashleigh Gardner 49 (36); Samantha Bates 3/22 (4 overs)

Sydney Thunder won by 18 runs
Sydney Cricket Ground, Sydney
Umpires: S Patel (Ind) and Troy Penman (Aus)
Player of the match: Samantha Bates (Sydney Thunder)

- Sydney Thunder won the toss and elected to bat.

Match 23
11 November 2024
17:40 UTC+10:30 (D/N)
Scorecard

Adelaide Strikers; 8/185 (20 overs)	v	Melbourne Renegades; 1/186 (17.1 overs)
Tahlia McGrath 49 (24); Hayley Matthews 2/28 (4 overs)		Hayley Matthews 85* (54); Darcie Brown 1/43 (4 overs)

Melbourne Renegades won by 9 wickets
Karen Rolton Oval, Adelaide
Umpires: Andrew Crozier (Aus) and Mary Waldron (Ire)
Player of the match: Hayley Matthews (Melbourne Renegades)

- Melbourne Renegades won the toss and elected to field.

Match 24
12 November 2024
18:10 UTC+11 (N)
Scorecard

Perth Scorchers; 7/171 (20 overs)	v	Sydney Thunder; 97 (19.3 overs)
Sophie Devine 48 (34); Chamari Athapaththu 2/18 (3 overs)		Phoebe Litchfield 27 (22); Amy Edgar 3/19 (3.3 overs)

Perth Scorchers won by 74 runs
Drummoyne Oval, Sydney
Umpires: Troy Penman (Aus) and Bede Sajowitz (Aus)
Player of the match: Chloe Ainsworth (Perth Scorchers)

- Perth Scorchers won the toss and elected to bat.

Match 25
13 November 2024
18:10 UTC+11 (N)
Scorecard

Hobart Hurricanes; 2/191 (20 overs)	v	Adelaide Strikers; 3/163 (20 overs)
Lizelle Lee 103 (59); Megan Schutt 1/21 (4 overs)		Laura Wolvaardt 63* (40); Amy Smith 1/16 (4 overs)

Hobart Hurricanes won by 28 runs
Bellerive Oval, Hobart
Umpires: Claire Polosak (Aus) and David Taylor (Aus)
Player of the match: Lizelle Lee (Hobart Hurricanes)

- Adelaide Strikers won the toss and elected to field.

Match 26
14 November 2024
15:30 UTC+11 (D/N)
Scorecard

Brisbane Heat; 9/139 (20 overs)	v	Sydney Sixers; 8/127 (20 overs)
Grace Harris 39 (26); Amelia Kerr 4/23 (4 overs)		Sarah Bryce 30 (26); Jess Jonassen 3/24 (4 overs)

Brisbane Heat won by 12 runs
North Sydney Oval, Sydney
Umpires: Mitchell Claydon (Aus) and Sharad Patel (Aus)
Player of the match: Jess Jonassen (Brisbane Heat)

- Brisbane Heat won the toss and elected to bat.

Match 27
15 November 2024
15:45 UTC+11 (D/N)
Scorecard

Perth Scorchers; 5/170 (20 overs)	v	Sydney Thunder; 3/173 (19 overs)
Beth Mooney 97 (64); Taneale Peschel 3/28 (4 overs)		Georgia Voll 97* (56); Amy Edgar 1/28 (4 overs)

Sydney Thunder won by 7 wickets
Melbourne Cricket Ground, Melbourne
Umpires: Daryl Brigham (Aus) and Chris Grant (Aus)
Player of the match: Georgia Voll (Sydney Thunder)

- Perth Scorchers won the toss and elected to bat.

Match 28
15 November 2024
19:15 UTC+11 (N)
Scorecard

Melbourne Renegades; 6/170 (20 overs)	v	Melbourne Stars; 8/161 (20 overs)
Nicole Faltum 66* (42); Kim Garth 2/32 (4 overs)		Rhys McKenna 34 (18); Sarah Coyte 2/13 (2 overs)

Melbourne Renegades won by 9 runs
Melbourne Cricket Ground, Melbourne
Umpires: Daryl Brigham (Aus) and Chris Grant (Aus)
Player of the match: Nicole Faltum (Melbourne Renegades)

- Melbourne Renegades won the toss and elected to bat.

Match 29
16 November 2024
15:00 UTC+10:30 (D/N)
Scorecard

Adelaide Strikers; 7/140 (20 overs)	v	Hobart Hurricanes; 102 (15.2 overs)
Madeline Penna 60 (40); Amy Smith 3/18 (4 overs)		Elyse Villani 44 (39); Tahlia McGrath 4/13 (3.2 overs)

Adelaide Strikers won by 38 runs
Adelaide Oval, Adelaide
Umpires: Peter George (Aus) and Mary Waldron (Ire)
Player of the match: Madeline Penna (Adelaide Strikers)

- Adelaide Strikers won the toss and elected to bat.

Match 30
17 November 2024
13:55 UTC+11
Scorecard

Melbourne Stars; 138 (20 overs)	v	Brisbane Heat; 4/139 (17.3 overs)
Kim Garth 31* (20); Lucy Hamilton 5/8 (4 overs)		Jemimah Rodrigues 45 (31); Kim Garth 1/21 (3 overs)

Brisbane Heat won by 6 wickets
Drummoyne Oval, Sydney
Umpires: Roberto Howard (Aus) and Bede Sajowitz (Aus)
Player of the match: Lucy Hamilton (Brisbane Heat)

- Brisbane Heat won the toss and elected to field.

Match 31
17 November 2024
17:25 UTC+11 (D/N)
Scorecard

Sydney Thunder; 121 (19.5 overs)	v	Sydney Sixers; 1/9 (2 overs)
Georgia Voll 29 (17); Amelia Kerr 3/16 (4 overs)		Ellyse Perry 8 (8); Samantha Bates 1/4 (1 over)

No result
Drummoyne Oval, Sydney
Umpires: Roberto Howard (Aus) and Bede Sajowitz (Aus)

- Sydney Sixers won the toss and elected to field.
- Rain prevented any further play.

Match 32
19 November 2024
17:40 UTC+10:30 (D/N)
Scorecard

Adelaide Strikers; 6/169 (20 overs)	v	Perth Scorchers; 8/139 (20 overs)
Laura Wolvaardt 48 (28); Alana King 3/29 (4 overs)		Brooke Halliday 47 (44); Megan Schutt 3/19 (4 overs)

Adelaide Strikers won by 30 runs
Karen Rolton Oval, Adelaide
Umpires: Daryl Brigham (Aus) and David Taylor (Aus)
Player of the match: Megan Schutt (Adelaide Strikers)

- Perth Scorchers won the toss and elected to field.

Match 33
20 November 2024
18:10 UTC+11 (N)
Scorecard

Melbourne Stars; 9/108 (20 overs)	v	Sydney Thunder; 6/112 (19.4 overs)
Sophie Reid 21 (21); Hannah Darlington 3/26 (4 overs)		Tahlia Wilson 33 (40); Marizanne Kapp 3/20 (4 overs)

Sydney Thunder won by 4 wickets
Drummoyne Oval, Sydney
Umpires: Mitchell Claydon (Aus) and Troy Penman (Aus)
Player of the match: Hannah Darlington (Sydney Thunder)

- Sydney Thunder won the toss and elected to field.

Match 34
21 November 2024
15:45 UTC+11 (D/N)
Scorecard

Perth Scorchers; 126 (19.2 overs)	v	Sydney Sixers; 7/126 (20 overs)
Beth Mooney 44 (37); Ashleigh Gardner 4/21 (4 overs)		Ellyse Perry 67 (53); Alana King 3/21 (4 overs)

Match tied
Bellerive Oval, Hobart
Umpires: David Taylor (Aus) and Muhammad Qureshi (Aus)
Player of the match: Ellyse Perry (Sydney Sixers)

- Perth Scorchers won the toss and elected to bat.
- Super Over: Sydney Sixers 0/15, Perth Scorchers 1/15

Match 35
21 November 2024
19:15 UTC+11 (N)
Scorecard

Melbourne Renegades; 5/150 (20 overs)	v	Hobart Hurricanes; 8/128 (20 overs)
Georgia Wareham 69 (45); Nicola Carey 3/26 (4 overs)		Elyse Villani 36 (35); Sophie Molineux 2/26 (4 overs)

Melbourne Renegades won by 22 runs
Bellerive Oval, Hobart
Umpires: David Taylor (Aus) and Muhammad Qureshi (Aus)
Player of the match: Georgia Wareham (Melbourne Renegades)

- Melbourne Renegades won the toss and elected to bat.

Match 36
22 November 2024
19:10 UTC+10 (N)
Scorecard

Melbourne Stars; 6/46 (7 overs)	v	Brisbane Heat; 1/47 (5.2 overs)
Rhys McKenna 15 (9); Jess Jonassen 3/8 (2 overs)		Grace Harris 21* (16); Annabel Sutherland 1/16 (1 over)

Brisbane Heat won by 9 wickets
Allan Border Field, Brisbane
Umpires: Roberto Howard (Aus) and Donovan Koch (Aus)
Player of the match: Jess Jonassen (Brisbane Heat)

- Brisbane Heat won the toss and elected to field.
- Match reduced to 7 overs per side due to rain.

Match 37
23 November 2024
10:00 UTC+11
Scorecard

Sydney Thunder; 133 (19.1 overs)	v	Melbourne Renegades; 1/137 (14.2 overs)
Phoebe Litchfield 30 (17); Sophie Molineux 4/23 (4 overs)		Hayley Matthews 60* (37); Samantha Bates 1/28 (3 overs)

Melbourne Renegades won by 9 wickets
CitiPower Centre, Melbourne
Umpires: Daryl Brigham (Aus) and Clare Haysom (Aus)
Player of the match: Sophie Molineux (Melbourne Renegades)

- Sydney Thunder won the toss and elected to bat.

Match 38
23 November 2024
17:55 UTC+8 (D/N)
Scorecard

Perth Scorchers; 138 (20 overs)	v	Hobart Hurricanes; 7/139 (17.4 overs)
Beth Mooney 50 (40); Amy Smith 3/17 (4 overs)		Lizelle Lee 44 (22); Sophie Devine 4/26 (4 overs)

Hobart Hurricanes won by 3 wickets
WACA Ground, Perth
Umpires: Ahmad Khan (Aus) and Jamie Thomas (Aus)
Player of the match: Kathryn Bryce (Hobart Hurricanes)

- Perth Scorchers won the toss and elected to bat.

Match 39
24 November 2024
10:00 UTC+11
Scorecard

Melbourne Stars	v	Adelaide Strikers

Match abandoned
CitiPower Centre, Melbourne
Umpires: Chris Grant (Aus) and Lisa McCabe (Aus)

- No toss.
- Rain prevented any play.

Match 40
24 November 2024
19:05 UTC+10 (N)
Scorecard

Sydney Sixers; 140 (20 overs)	v	Brisbane Heat; 5/142 (17 overs)
Amelia Kerr 41 (37); Lucy Hamilton 3/21 (4 overs)		Jess Jonassen 39* (29); Amelia Kerr 2/30 (4 overs)

Brisbane Heat won by 5 wickets
Allan Border Field, Brisbane
Umpires: David Taylor (Aus) and Riki Wessels (Eng)
Player of the match: Jess Jonassen (Brisbane Heat)

- Brisbane Heat won the toss and elected to field.

== Knockout stage ==
Knockout
3	Sydney Thunder	4/129 (19 overs)
4	Hobart Hurricanes	6/126 (20 overs)

Challenger
2	Brisbane Heat	1/134 (15.2 overs)
KW	Sydney Thunder	7/133 (20 overs)

The Final
1	Melbourne Renegades	9/141 (20 overs)
CW	Brisbane Heat	6/90 (12 overs)

=== Knockout ===
27 November 2024
19:15 UTC+11 (N)
Scorecard

Hobart Hurricanes; 6/126 (20 overs)	v	Sydney Thunder; 4/129 (19 overs)
Elyse Villani 49* (42); Chamari Athapaththu 2/24 (4 overs); Taneale Peschel 2/24 (4 overs)		Phoebe Litchfield 46 (36); Molly Strano 1/8 (4 overs)

Sydney Thunder won by 6 wickets
Drummoyne Oval, Sydney
Umpires: Andrew Crozier (Aus) and Sharad Patel (Aus)
Player of the match: Phoebe Litchfield (Sydney Thunder)

- Hobart Hurricanes won the toss and elected to bat.

=== Challenger ===
29 November 2024
18:15 UTC+10 (N)
Scorecard

Sydney Thunder; 7/133 (20 overs)	v	Brisbane Heat; 1/134 (15.2 overs)
Hannah Darlington 40* (29); Grace Parsons 3/10 (3 overs)		Georgia Redmayne 50* (41); Samantha Bates 1/25 (3.2 overs)

Brisbane Heat won by 9 wickets
Allan Border Field, Brisbane
Umpires: Claire Polosak (Aus) and Stephen Dionysius (Aus)
Player of the match: Grace Parsons (Brisbane Heat)

- Brisbane Heat won the toss and elected to field.

=== The Final ===
1 December 2024
13:20 UTC+11
Scorecard

Melbourne Renegades; 9/141 (20 overs)	v	Brisbane Heat; 6/90 (12 overs)
Hayley Matthews 69 (61); Charli Knott 3/28 (4 overs)		Jess Jonassen 44* (28); Hayley Matthews 2/24 (3 overs)

Melbourne Renegades won by 7 runs (DLS method)
Melbourne Cricket Ground, Melbourne
Umpires: Andrew Crozier (Aus) and Claire Polosak (Aus)
Player of the match: Hayley Matthews (Melbourne Renegades)

- Brisbane Heat won the toss and elected to field.
- Brisbane Heat were set a revised target of 98 runs in 12 overs due to rain.

== Statistics ==
=== Highest totals ===
Score	Team	Against	Venue	Date
5/212	Sydney Thunder	Adelaide Strikers	North Sydney Oval, Sydney	1 November 2024
3/203	Hobart Hurricanes	Perth Scorchers	Sydney Cricket Ground, Sydney	10 November 2024
4/195	Melbourne Stars	Sydney Sixers	North Sydney Oval, Sydney	1 November 2024
2/191	Hobart Hurricanes	Adelaide Strikers	Bellerive Oval, Hobart	13 November 2024
1/186	Melbourne Renegades	Adelaide Strikers	Karen Rolton Oval, Adelaide	11 November 2024

- Source: ESPNcricinfo

=== Most runs ===
Runs	Player	Team
424	Ellyse Perry	Sydney Sixers
399	Lizelle Lee	Hobart Hurricanes
386	Beth Mooney	Perth Scorchers
342	Phoebe Litchfield	Sydney Thunder
330	Georgia Voll	Sydney Thunder

- Source: ESPNcricinfo

=== Most wickets ===
Wickets	Player	Team
20	Alana King	Perth Scorchers
20	Samantha Bates	Sydney Thunder
17	Jess Jonassen	Brisbane Heat
16	Sophie Molineux	Melbourne Renegades
16	Ashleigh Gardner	Sydney Sixers

- Source: ESPNcricinfo

== Awards ==
=== Player of the tournament ===
Player of the Tournament votes are awarded on a 3–2–1 basis by the two standing umpires at the conclusion of every match, meaning a player can receive a maximum of six votes per game.

Pos.	Player	Team	Votes
=1st	Ellyse Perry	Sydney Sixers	25
=1st	Jess Jonassen	Brisbane Heat	25
3rd	Samantha Bates	Sydney Thunder	19
4th	Sophie Molineux	Melbourne Renegades	18
5th	Georgia Voll	Sydney Thunder	17

=== Other awards ===
Award	Player	Team
Golden bat	Ellyse Perry	Sydney Sixers
Golden arm	Alana King	Perth Scorchers
Young gun	Chloe Ainsworth	Perth Scorchers

- Source: Cricket Australia

=== Team of the tournament ===
The team of the tournament was announced on 26 November 2024, as selected by the eight head coaches of the participating teams.

- Ellyse Perry (Sydney Sixers)
- Lizelle Lee (Hobart Hurricanes)
- Beth Mooney (wk) (Perth Scorchers)
- Georgia Voll (Sydney Thunder)
- Phoebe Litchfield (Sydney Thunder)
- Hayley Matthews (Melbourne Renegades)
- Sophie Molineux (c) (Melbourne Renegades)
- Alana King (Perth Scorchers)
- Chloe Ainsworth (Perth Scorchers)
- Shikha Pandey (Brisbane Heat)
- Samantha Bates (Sydney Thunder)
- 12th: Georgia Wareham (Melbourne Renegades)

== See also ==
- 2024–25 Big Bash League season
