= List of Women's Big Bash League records and statistics =

The Women's Big Bash League (WBBL), also known as the Weber Women's Big Bash League for sponsorship reasons, is an Australian professional Twenty20 cricket league, which was established in 2015 by Cricket Australia. Records listed here are counted from the inaugural season onwards. Players who competed in the 2025–26 Women's Big Bash League season are highlighted in boldface.

== Listing notation ==
=== Team Notation ===
- (2/200) indicates that a team scored 200 runs for two wickets and the innings was closed, either due to a successful run chase or if no playing time remained
- (200) indicates that a team scored 200 runs and was all out

=== Batting notation ===
- (100) indicates that a batter scored 100 runs and was out
- (100*) indicates that a batter scored 100 runs and was not out

=== Bowling notation ===
- (5/20) 4.0 indicates that a bowler has captured 5 wickets while conceding 20 runs from 4 overs.

== Team records ==
=== Results summary ===
Team	Mat	Won	Lost	NR	Win %	Titles
Adelaide Strikers	152	72	67	7	47.36	2
Brisbane Heat	157	87	66	2	55.41	2
Hobart Hurricanes	148	56	84	5	37.83	1
Melbourne Renegades	147	60	78	3	40.81	1
Melbourne Stars	145	57	79	7	39.31	0
Perth Scorchers	156	80	69	3	51.28	1
Sydney Sixers	153	86	60	3	56.20	2
Sydney Thunder	152	72	67	10	47.36	2
As of Hobart Hurricanes v Perth Scorchers at Hobart, Finals, WBBL|11

Notes

- The win percentage is the percentage of completed matches won (i.e. % of wins vs % of losses)

=== Highest Totals ===
Score (Overs)	Team	Opposition	Season
4/242 (20.0 overs)	Sydney Sixers	Melbourne Stars	2017–18
7/229 (20.0 overs)	Brisbane Heat	Perth Scorchers	2023–24
4/219 (20.0 overs)	Melbourne Stars	Sydney Sixers	2025–26
3/212 (20.0 overs)	Hobart Hurricanes	Melbourne Renegades	2023–24
5/212 (20.0 overs)	Sydney Thunder	Adelaide Strikers	2024–25

=== Lowest Totals ===
Score (Overs)	Team	Opposition	Season
29 (9.3 overs)	Melbourne Stars	Adelaide Strikers	2023–24
42 (7.4 overs)	Sydney Sixers	Melbourne Stars	2025–26
64 (17.0 overs)	Sydney Thunder	Melbourne Renegades	2025–26
66 (14.1 overs)	Hobart Hurricanes	Sydney Sixers	2016–17
66 (16.1 overs)	Brisbane Heat	Melbourne Renegades	2017–18

=== Highest successful run chases ===
Score (Overs)	Team	Opposition	Season
3/189 (19.1 overs)	Hobart Hurricanes	Perth Scorchers	2025–26
1/186 (17.1 overs)	Melbourne Renegades	Adelaide Strikers	2024–25
4/185 (19.0 overs)	Melbourne Renegades	Brisbane Heat	2019–20
5/184 (18.4 overs)	Sydney Sixers	Melbourne Stars	2020–21
4/182 (19.3 overs)	Hobart Hurricanes	Sydney Thunder	2025–26

=== Other team records ===
- Biggest winning margin:
  - Batting first: Adelaide Strikers – 148 runs vs Melbourne Stars, 21 October 2023
  - Fielding first: Brisbane Heat – 68 balls remaining vs Melbourne Stars, 10 January 2019
- Longest winning streak: Sydney Sixers – 9 matches
- Longest head-to-head winning streak: Sydney Sixers – 11 matches vs Hobart Hurricanes

== Batting records ==
=== Most runs ===
Batter	Inns	Runs	Span
**Beth Mooney** (Heat, Scorchers)	154	**5,600**	2015–2025
**Ellyse Perry** (Sixers)	141	**5,101**	2015–2025
**Sophie Devine** (Strikers, Scorchers)	142	**4,195**	2015–2025
**Elyse Villani** (Scorchers, Stars, Hurricanes)	143	**3,841**	2015–2025
**Meg Lanning** (Scorchers, Stars)	108	**3,646**	2015–2025

=== Highest batting average ===
Batter	Inns	Average	Runs	Span
**Ellyse Perry** (Sixers)	141	**49.04**	5,101	2015–2025
**Beth Mooney** (Heat, Scorchers)	154	**46.28**	5,600	2015–2025
**Meg Lanning** (Scorchers, Stars)	108	**40.06**	3,646	2015–2025
Harmanpreet Kaur (Thunder, Renegades)	58	**37.89**	1,440	2016–2023
**Sophie Devine** (Strikers, Scorchers)	142	**34.95**	4,195	2015–2025
Minimum innings played – 10

=== Highest individual score ===
Batter	Runs	Balls	Opposition	Season
**Lizelle Lee** (Hurricanes)	**150***	75	Perth Scorchers	2024–25
**Grace Harris** (Heat)	**136***	59	Perth Scorchers	2023–24
**Meg Lanning** (Stars)	**135**	79	Sydney Sixers	2025–26
Smriti Mandhana (Thunder)	**114***	64	Melbourne Renegades	2021–22
**Ashleigh Gardner** (Sixers)	**114**	52	Melbourne Stars	2017–18

=== Most sixes ===
Batter	6s	Span
**Sophie Devine** (Strikers, Scorchers)	**155**	2015–2025
**Lizelle Lee** (Stars, Renegades, Hurricanes)	**108**	2017–2025
**Ashleigh Gardner** (Sixers)	**98**	2015–2025
**Grace Harris** (Renegades, Heat)	**90**	2015–2025
**Ellyse Perry** (Sixers)	**82**	2015–2025

=== Best strike rate ===
Batter	SR	Span
**Laura Harris** (Heat, Thunder)	**160.76**	2015–2025
**Alyssa Healy** (Sixers)	**133.71**	2015–2025
**Lizelle Lee** (Stars, Renegades, Hurricanes)	**133.55**	2017–2025
**Amanda-Jade Wellington** (Strikers)	**132.22**	2015–2025
Smriti Mandhana (Heat, Hurricanes, Thunder, Strikers)	**131.81**	2016–2024
Minimum balls faced – 500

=== Most ducks ===
Batter	Ducks	Inns	Span
**Alyssa Healy** (Sixers)	**16**	138	2015–2025
**Tahlia McGrath** (Strikers)	**15**	140	2015–2025
Rachel Priest (Renegades, Thunder, Hurricanes)	**14**	95	2015–2021

=== Other batting records ===
- Most runs in a season: Ellyse Perry (Sydney Sixers) – 778 (2018–19)

== Bowling records ==
=== Most wickets ===
Bowler	Inn	Wkts	Span
**Jess Jonassen** (Heat)	153	**184**	2015–2025
**Molly Strano** (Renegades, Hurricanes)	147	**172**	2015–2025
**Amanda-Jade Wellington** (Strikers)	152	**165**	2015–2025
**Heather Graham** (Scorchers, Hurricanes)	141	**157**	2015–2025
**Megan Schutt** (Strikers)	115	**150**	2015–2025

=== List of hat-tricks ===
No.	Player	Team	Opposition	Dismissals	Season
1	Nicole Bolton	Perth Scorchers	Hobart Hurricanes	Amy Satterthwaite (lbw); Hayley Matthews (lbw); Corinne Hall (c)	2015–16
2	Gemma Triscari	Melbourne Stars	Sydney Thunder	Rachael Haynes (c); Nicola Carey (c); Erin Osborne (st)	2015–16
3	Amy Satterthwaite	Hobart Hurricanes	Sydney Thunder	Naomi Stalenberg (b); Rene Farrell (c); Lauren Cheatle (c)	2016–17
4	Dane van Niekerk	Sydney Sixers	Hobart Hurricanes	Veda Krishnamurthy (b); Corinne Hall (b); Nicola Hancock (b)	2017–18
5	Marizanne Kapp	Sydney Sixers	Melbourne Stars	Madeline Penna (b); Nicola Hancock (b); Holly Ferling (lbw)	2019–20
6	Darcie Brown	Adelaide Strikers	Brisbane Heat	Georgia Redmayne (c); Ellie Johnston (c); Laura Harris (c)	2019–22
7	Caoimhe Bray	Sydney Sixers	Sydney Thunder	Phoebe Litchfield (c); Anika Learoyd (b); Laura Harris (c)	2025–26

Last updated: 30 December 2025

=== Best economy rates ===
Player	Mat	Econ	Span
Smriti Mandhana (Heat, Hurricanes, Thunder, Strikers)	43	**3.85**	2016–2024
Julie Hunter (Hurricanes)	25	**5.16**	2015–2017
Anya Shrubsole (Scorchers)	12	**5.26**	2016–2017
Katherine Sciver-Brunt (Scorchers, Stars)	556	**5.38**	2015–2020
Nicky Shaw (Scorchers)	15	**5.61**	2015–2016
Minimum matches played – 10

=== Other bowling records ===
- Most wickets: Sarah Aley (Sydney Sixers) – 28 (2016–17)

== Fielding records ==
=== Most dismissals (wicket-keeper) ===
Wicket-keeper	Inns	Dis	Ct	St	Span
**Beth Mooney** (Heat, Scorchers)	153	**124**	77	47	2015–2025
**Georgia Redmayne** (Hurricanes, Scorchers, Heat)	122	**115**	69	46	2015–2025
**Alyssa Healy** (Sixers)	127	**103**	58	45	2015–2025
Tegan McPharlin (Strikers)	103	**91**	51	40	2015–2022
Rachel Priest (Renegades, Thunder, Hurricanes)	93	**73**	33	40	2015–2021

=== Most catches (fielder) ===
Fielder	Inns	Ct	Span
**Ellyse Perry** (Sixers)	143	**67**	2015–2025
**Erin Burns** (Hurricanes, Sixers)	126	**65**	2015–2025
**Grace Harris** (Renegades, Heat)	135	**64**	2015–2025
**Ashleigh Gardner** (Sixers)	144	**59**	2015–2025
**Elyse Villani** (Scorchers, Stars, Hurricanes)	144	**58**	2015–2025

== Partnership records ==
=== Highest partnership by wicket ===
Wicket	Runs	First batter	Second batter	Team	Opposition	Venue	Date
1st wicket	199*	Ellyse Perry	Alyssa Healy	Sixers	Stars	WACA Ground, Perth	3 November 2019
2nd wicket	156*	Meg Lanning	Mignon du Preez	Stars	Strikers	Junction Oval, Melbourne	8 January 2016
3rd wicket	143	Danni Wyatt-Hodge	Nicola Carey	Hurricanes	Thunder	Allan Border Field, Brisbane	9 November 2025
4th wicket	123	Beth Mooney	Marizanne Kapp	Scorchers	Renegades	Junction Oval, Melbourne	12 November 2022
5th wicket	126	Erin Osborne	Mignon du Preez	Stars	Hurricanes	West Park Oval, Burnie	8 December 2018
6th wicket	92*	Sophie Ecclestone	Erin Burns	Sixers	Hurricanes	North Sydney Oval, Sydney	16 November 2022
7th wicket	84	Ashleigh Gardner	Maitlan Brown	Sixers	Stars	North Sydney Oval, Sydney	19 October 2019
7th wicket	84	Naomi Stalenberg	Hayley Silver-Holmes	Hurricanes	Scorchers	WACA Ground, Perth	25 October 2019
8th wicket	64*	Taneale Peschel	Hannah Darlington	Thunder	Heat	Allan Border Field, Brisbane	29 November 2024
9th wicket	55	Georgia Redmayne	Brooke Hepburn	Hurricanes	Sixers	Bellerive Oval, Hobart	16 December 2018
10th wicket	34*	Taneale Peschel	Alana King	Scorchers	Stars	Junction Oval, Melbourne	29 October 2023

=== Highest partnership by runs ===
Runs	First batter	Second batter	Team	Opposition	Wicket	Venue	Date
199*	Ellyse Perry	Alyssa Healy	Sixers	Stars	1st wicket	WACA Ground, Perth	3 November 2019
173	Beth Mooney	Sophie Devine	Scorchers	Thunder	1st wicket	University of Tasmania Stadium, Launceston	24 October 2021
165	Beth Mooney	Sophie Devine	Scorchers	Renegades	1st wicket	WACA Ground, Perth	3 November 2021
165	Georgia Redmayne	Grace Harris	Heat	Hurricanes	1st wicket	Renegades	18 October 2022
159	Rhys McKenna	Meg Lanning	Stars	Sixers	1st wicket	North Sydney Oval, Sydney	20 November 2015

== See also ==
- List of Big Bash League records and statistics
- List of Women's Big Bash League centuries
