= 2024–25 Women's Big Bash League final =

2024–25 WBBL cricket tournament final in Australia

2024–25 Women's Big Bash League Final
- Event: 2024–25 Women's Big Bash League
Melbourne Renegades	Brisbane Heat
9/141	6/90
20 overs	12 overs
- Melbourne Renegades won by 7 runs (DLS method)
- Date: 1 December 2024
- Venue: Melbourne Cricket Ground, Melbourne
- Player of the match: Hayley Matthews (Melbourne Renegades)
- Umpires: Andrew Crozier (Aus) and Claire Polosak (Aus)

The 2024–25 Women's Big Bash League Final was a Twenty20 match to decide the winner of the 2024–25 Women's Big Bash League season. It was played on 1 December 2024 at the Melbourne Cricket Ground in Melbourne.

== Road to the final ==
Melbourne Renegades			vs	Brisbane Heat
League Stage
Opponent	Scorecard	Result	Match No.	Opponent	Scorecard	Result
Sydney Sixers	27 October 2024	Lost	1	Adelaide Strikers	27 October 2024	Won
Brisbane Heat	30 October 2024	Lost	2	Melbourne Renegades	30 October 2024	Won
Perth Scorchers	2 November 2024	Won	3	Hobart Hurricanes	2 November 2024	Lost
Adelaide Strikers	2 November 2024	Won	4	Perth Scorchers	3 November 2024	Lost
Perth Scorchers	7 November 2024	Lost	5	Sydney Thunder	7 November 2024	Lost
Melbourne Stars	9 November 2024	Won	6	Adelaide Strikers	9 November 2024	Won
Adelaide Strikers	11 November 2024	Won	7	Sydney Sixers	14 November 2024	Won
Melbourne Stars	15 November 2024	Won	8	Melbourne Stars	17 November 2024	Won
Hobart Hurricanes	21 November 2024	Won	9	Melbourne Stars	22 November 2024	Won
Sydney Thunder	23 November 2024	Won	10	Sydney Sixers	24 November 2024	Won
Playoff stage
Qualifier
Opponent	Scorecard	Result	Titles	Opponent	Scorecard	Result
Qualified for the finals			K	Qualified for the Challenger
Qualified for the finals			C	Sydney Thunder	29 November 2024	Won

== Match ==
=== Match officials ===
- On-field umpires: Andrew Crozier and Claire Polosak
- Third umpire: Troy Penman
- Match referee: Steve Davis
- Toss: Brisbane Heat won the toss and elected to field.

=== Summary ===
1 December 2024
13:20 UTC+11
Scorecard

Melbourne Renegades; 9/141 (20 overs)	v	Brisbane Heat; 6/90 (12 overs)
Hayley Matthews 69 (61); Charli Knott 3/28 (4 overs)		Jess Jonassen 44* (28); Hayley Matthews 2/24 (3 overs)

Melbourne Renegades won by 7 runs (DLS method)
Melbourne Cricket Ground, Melbourne
Umpires: Andrew Crozier (Aus) and Claire Polosak (Aus)
Player of the match: Hayley Matthews (Melbourne Renegades)

- Brisbane Heat won the toss and elected to field.
- Brisbane Heat were set a revised target of 98 runs in 12 overs due to rain.
