= List of Women's Big Bash League centuries =

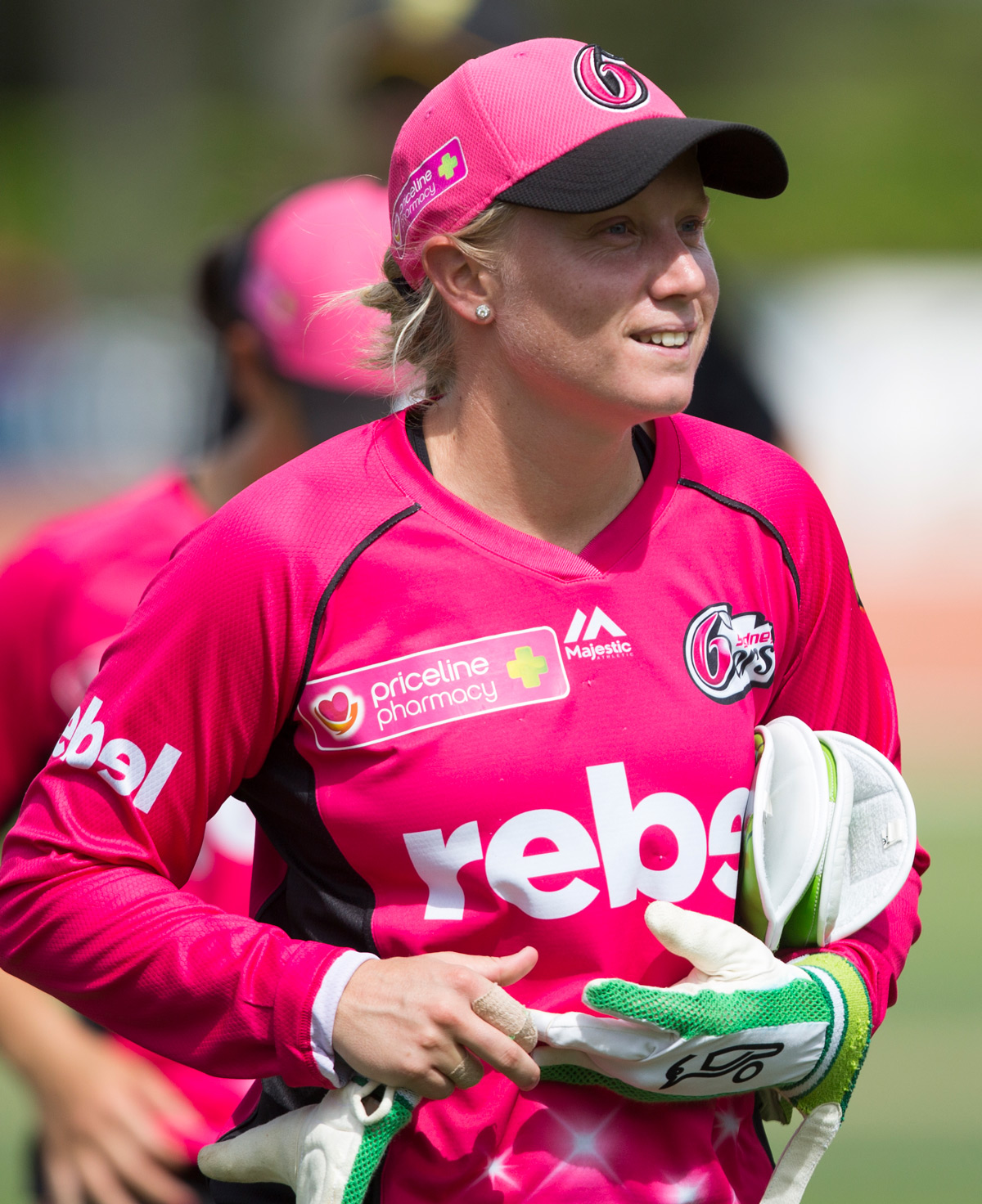
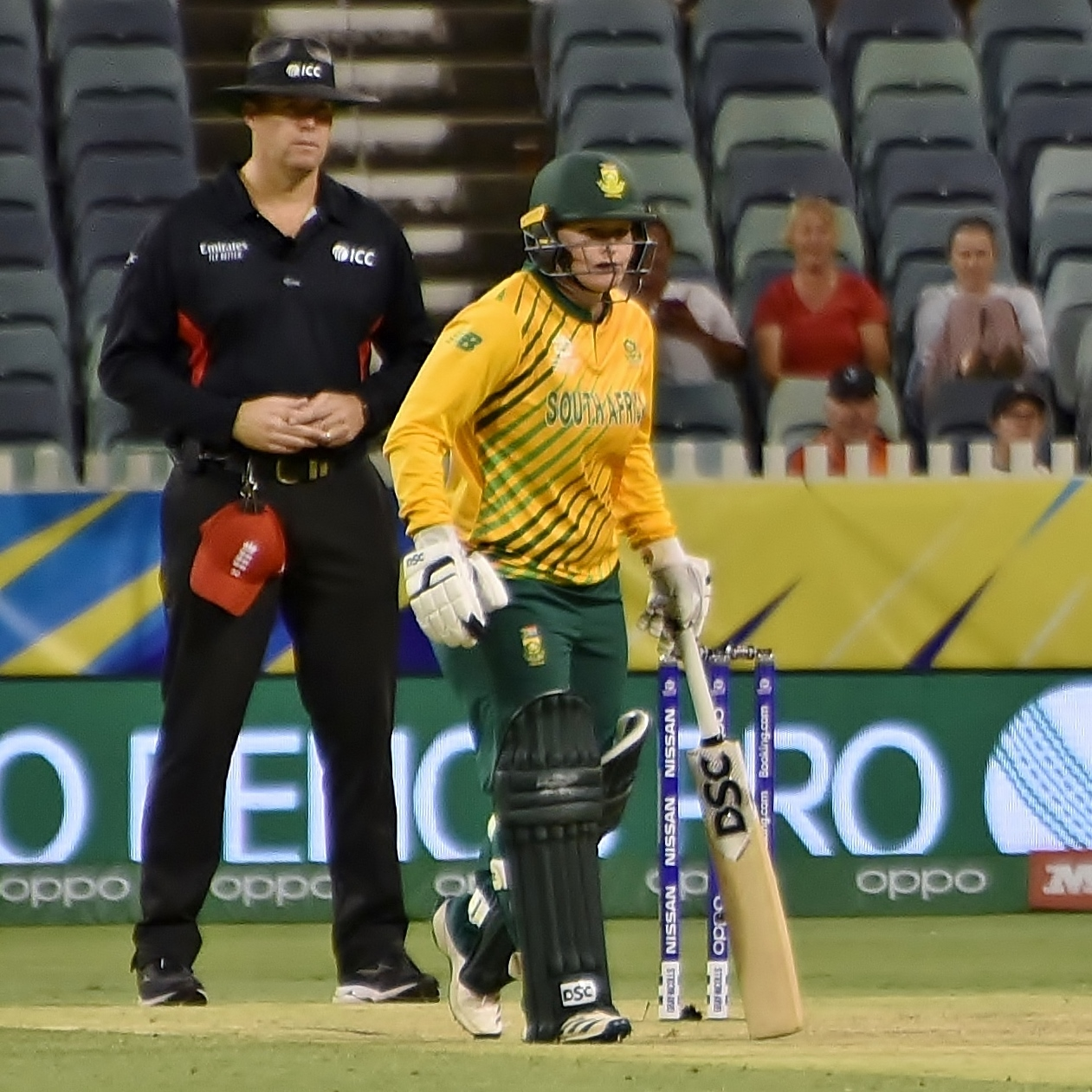
Alyssa Healy (left) and Lizelle Lee (right) are the only players to have scored five centuries during their WBBL careers.

In cricket, a batter reaches a century when they score 100 or more runs in a single innings. A century is regarded as a landmark score for a batter, and their number of centuries is generally recorded in their career statistics. The Women's Big Bash League (WBBL) is a professional league for Twenty20 cricket in Australia, which has been held annually since its first edition in 2015–16 onwards. In the eleven seasons played, 31 centuries have been scored. The Melbourne Renegades are the only franchise yet to have a batter score a century.

The first century in the WBBL was achieved on 12 December 2015 at Aquinas College by Grace Harris for Brisbane Heat against the Sydney Sixers. As of 2025, 12 of the 31 centuries scored have been scored by overseas batters—five by Lizelle Lee, four by Sophie Devine and one by Rachel Priest, Smriti Mandhana and Suzie Bates each. Alyssa Healy and Lizelle Lee are tied for the most career WBBL centuries, both having scored 5. The record for the highest individual score in the WBBL is held by Lizelle Lee, who played for the Hobart Hurricanes when she scored 150 runs* from 59 balls. She also holds the records for the most sixes scored during a century innings.

The below list includes all WBBL centuries organised in a chronological order.

== Key ==
| Symbol | Meaning |
|---|---|
| # | Serial number of century |
| * | Remained not out |
| † | Captained their team at the time of century |
| Balls | Balls faced during the innings |
| S/R. | Strike rate during the innings |
| Inn. | The innings of the match |
| Won | The match was won by the team for which the player played |
| Lost | The match was lost by the team for which the player played |

== Centuries ==
Women's Big Bash League centuries
| # | Score | Balls | S/R | Player | Team | Opposition | Inn. | Venue | Date | Result |
|---|---|---|---|---|---|---|---|---|---|---|
| 1 | 103 | 55 | 187.27 | Grace Harris (1/4) | Brisbane Heat | Sydney Sixers | 1 | Aquinas College, Perth | 12 December 2015 | Won |
| 2 | 103* | 48 | 214.58 | Sophie Devine (1/4) | Adelaide Strikers | Hobart Hurricanes | 2 | Glenelg Oval, Adelaide | 26 December 2016 | Won |
| 3 | 114 | 52 | 219.23 | Ashleigh Gardner | Sydney Sixers | Melbourne Stars | 1 | North Sydney Oval, Sydney | 9 December 2017 | Won |
| 4 | 102 | 65 | 156.92 | Suzie Bates † | Adelaide Strikers | Hobart Hurricanes | 1 | Glenelg Oval, Adelaide | 10 December 2017 | Won |
| 5 | 106 | 66 | 160.60 | Alyssa Healy (1/5) | Sydney Sixers | Adelaide Strikers | 2 | Hurstville Oval, Sydney | 27 January 2018 | Won |
| 6 | 102* | 56 | 182.14 | Lizelle Lee (1/5) | Melbourne Stars | Sydney Sixers | 2 | Junction Oval, Melbourne | 1 December 2018 | Won |
| 7 | 102* | 59 | 172.88 | Ellyse Perry † (1/3) | Sydney Sixers | Perth Scorchers | 2 | North Sydney Oval, Sydney | 7 December 2018 | Won |
| 8 | 101* | 42 | 240.47 | Grace Harris (2/4) | Brisbane Heat | Melbourne Stars | 2 | The Gabba, Brisbane | 19 December 2018 | Won |
| 9 | 103* | 64 | 160.93 | Ellyse Perry † (2/3) | Sydney Sixers | Brisbane Heat | 1 | Sydney Cricket Ground, Sydney | 22 December 2018 | Won |
| 10 | 112* | 69 | 162.31 | Alyssa Healy (2/5) | Sydney Sixers | Adelaide Strikers | 1 | Sydney Cricket Ground, Sydney | 28 December 2018 | Won |
| 11 | 102 | 55 | 185.45 | Beth Mooney (1/4) | Brisbane Heat | Sydney Thunder | 2 | Cazalys Stadium, Cairns | 12 January 2019 | Won |
| 12 | 103* | 65 | 158.46 | Lizelle Lee (2/5) | Melbourne Stars | Perth Scorchers | 1 | WACA Ground, Perth | 2 November 2019 | Won |
| 13 | 106* | 53 | 200.00 | Alyssa Healy (3/5) | Sydney Sixers | Melbourne Stars | 1 | WACA Ground, Perth | 3 November 2019 | Won |
| 14 | 101 | 67 | 150.74 | Meg Lanning † (1/2) | Perth Scorchers | Hobart Hurricanes | 1 | Lilac Hill Park, Perth | 1 December 2019 | Won |
| 15 | 103 | 68 | 151.47 | Sophie Devine (2/4) | Perth Scorchers | Sydney Sixers | 1 | Hurstville Oval, Sydney | 8 November 2020 | Won |
| 16 | 111 | 52 | 213.46 | Alyssa Healy (4/5) | Sydney Sixers | Melbourne Stars | 2 | North Sydney Oval, Sydney | 22 November 2020 | Won |
| 17 | 107* | 68 | 157.35 | Rachel Priest | Hobart Hurricanes | Melbourne Stars | 1 | Bellerive Oval, Hobart | 19 October 2021 | Won |
| 18 | 101 | 60 | 168.33 | Sophie Devine (3/4) | Perth Scorchers | Sydney Thunder | 1 | York Park, Launceston | 24 October 2021 | Won |
| 19 | 101* | 62 | 161.29 | Beth Mooney (2/4) | Perth Scorchers | Melbourne Renegades | 1 | WACA Ground, Perth | 3 November 2021 | Won |
| 20 | 114* | 64 | 178.12 | Smriti Mandhana | Sydney Thunder | Melbourne Renegades | 2 | Great Barrier Reef Arena, Mackay | 17 November 2021 | Won |
| 21 | 100* | 65 | 153.84 | Elyse Villani | Melbourne Stars | Adelaide Strikers | 2 | Adelaide Oval, Adelaide | 21 November 2021 | Won |
| 22 | 107* | 64 | 167.18 | Alyssa Healy (5/5) | Sydney Sixers | Perth Scorchers | 2 | Junction Oval, Melbourne | 13 November 2022 | Won |
| 23 | 136* | 59 | 230.50 | Grace Harris (3/4) | Brisbane Heat | Perth Scorchers | 1 | North Sydney Oval, Sydney | 22 October 2023 | Won |
| 24 | 106 | 62 | 170.96 | Sophie Devine (4/4) | Perth Scorchers | Brisbane Heat | 1 | Allan Border Field, Brisbane | 9 November 2023 | Won |
| 25 | 101* | 61 | 165.57 | Beth Mooney (3/4) | Perth Scorchers | Sydney Thunder | 1 | Junction Oval, Melbourne | 12 November 2023 | Won |
| 26 | 101* | 53 | 190.56 | Lizelle Lee (3/5) | Hobart Hurricanes | Melbourne Renegades | 1 | Bellerive Oval, Hobart | 23 November 2023 | Won |
| 27 | 150* | 75 | 200.00 | Lizelle Lee (4/5) | Hobart Hurricanes | Perth Scorchers | 1 | Sydney Cricket Ground, Sydney | 10 November 2024 | Won |
| 28 | 103 | 59 | 174.57 | Lizelle Lee (5/5) | Hobart Hurricanes | Adelaide Strikers | 1 | Bellerive Oval, Hobart | 14 November 2024 | Won |
| 29 | 105 | 73 | 143.83 | Beth Mooney (4/4) | Perth Scorchers | Brisbane Heat | 1 | Allan Border Field, Brisbane | 12 November 2025 | Won |
| 30 | 135 | 74 | 182.43 | Meg Lanning (2/2) | Melbourne Stars | Sydney Sixers | 1 | North Sydney Oval, Sydney | 20 November 2025 | Won |
| 31 | 111 | 74 | 156.33 | Ellyse Perry (3/3) | Sydney Sixers | Adelaide Strikers | 1 | North Sydney Oval, Sydney | 7 December 2025 | Won |
| 32 | 124 | 60 | 206.67 | Ashleigh Gardner † (2/2) | Sydney Sixers | Hobart Hurricanes | 1 | Drummoyne Oval, Sydney | 1 November 2026 | Won |
| 33 | 104 | 61 | 170.49 | Charli Knott | Brisbane Heat | Adelaide Strikers | 1 | Drummoyne Oval, Sydney | 5 November 2026 | Won |
| 34 | 121* | 67 | 180.59 | Grace Harris (4/4) | Brisbane Heat | Sydney Thunder | 1 | Allan Border Field, Brisbane | 19 November 2026 | Lost |

== See also ==
- List of Women's Big Bash League records and statistics
