= James Sutherland (cricket administrator) =

Australian cricketer and executive (born 1965)

Personal information
- Full name: James Alexander Sutherland
- Born: 14 July 1965 (age 61); East Melbourne, Victoria, Australia
- Batting: Right-handed
- Bowling: Right-arm fast-medium
- Role: Bowler
- Relatives: Will Sutherland (son); Annabel Sutherland (daughter)

Domestic team information
- Years: Team
- 1990/91–1993/94: Victoria

Career statistics
Competition	First-class	List A
Matches	4	9
Runs scored	54	28
Batting average	13.50	9.33
100s/50s	0/0	0/0
Top score	18*	13
Balls bowled	748	510
Wickets	9	12
Bowling average	39.77	26.75
5 wickets in innings	0	0
10 wickets in match	0	0
Best bowling	2/23	3/26
Catches/stumpings	2/–	4/–
- Source: CricketArchive, 17 April 2023

James Alexander Sutherland (born 14 July 1965) is an Australian former first-class cricketer and cricket administrator. He played for Victoria in the Sheffield Shield and was the chief executive officer of Cricket Australia, from 2001 to 2018. He was born in East Melbourne in 1965.

A right arm fast-medium bowler, Sutherland made his first-class debut against Queensland at the St Kilda Cricket Ground, where one of his opponents, Scott Muller, was also debuting. He claimed Carl Rackemann as his maiden wicket and in the second innings dismissed Stuart Law for the first of his two-second innings victims. The following week the Victorians defeated New South Wales in the Sheffield Shield Final but the paceman had lost his place in the side to Paul Jackson and instead was relegated to 12th man.

In his three other first-class appearances he chipped in with the occasional wicket but was unable to take a big haul. He did however take some big wickets, including Justin Langer twice and against Tasmania he dismissed Ricky Ponting hit wicket. As Cricket Australia chief executive, Sutherland would later work alongside the Australian captain, as he did with Steve Waugh whom he also took the wicket of during his career, on his List A debut. He was part of Victoria's 1992/93 Mercantile Mutual Cup campaign and played in the Final which they lost to New South Wales.

Sutherland is a chartered accountant who formerly worked for Ernst & Young. Following the conclusion of Sutherland's cricket career, he became a finance manager at the Carlton Football Club and was appointed as an assistant coach of Victoria in 1998/99, having become a Level III coach. Sutherland also had a stint as coach of the Melbourne University Cricket Club, where he is a life member, having played District cricket there for many years.

Sutherland joined the Australian Cricket Board, now known as Cricket Australia, as general manager in 1998. Three years later (in 2001) he replaced Malcolm Speed to become the chief executive.

On 6 June 2018, Sutherland announced his retirement, giving Cricket Australia 12 months notice to find a suitable replacement.

In 2019, Sutherland became chairman of PlayHQ, a community sport competition platform.

In August 2020, Sutherland was appointed CEO of Golf Australia.
