= Milly Illingworth =

Australian cricketer

Personal information
- Full name: Millicent Hall Illingworth
- Born: 15 July 2005 (age 21); Geelong, Victoria, Australia
- Batting: Right-handed
- Bowling: Right-arm fast
- Role: Bowler

Domestic team information
- Years: Team
- 2022/23–present: Victoria
- 2023/24: Melbourne Stars
- 2024/25-present: Melbourne Renegades

Career statistics
Competition	WLA	WT20
Matches	15	13
Runs scored	13	20
Batting average	–
100s/50s	0/0	0/0
Top score	13	14*
Balls bowled	496	144
Wickets	18	2
Bowling average	32.95	92.50
5 wickets in innings	0	0
10 wickets in match	0	0
Best bowling	4/41	1/12
Catches/stumpings	1/–	/
- Source: CricketArchive, 3 March 2023

Millicent Hall Illingworth (born 15 July 2005) is an Australian cricketer who currently plays for Victoria in the Women's National Cricket League (WNCL) and Melbourne Renegades in the Women's Big Bash League (WBBL). She plays as a right-arm fast bowler.

== Early life ==
Illingworth was born on 15 July 2005 in Geelong, Victoria.

== Domestic career ==
In December 2022, Illingworth played for Victoria in the Cricket Australia Under-19 National Female Championships, taking nine wickets. In February 2023, she was named in a senior Victoria squad for the first time and made her debut for the side on 10 February 2022, against Western Australia, where she took 4/41 from her 6.4 overs. She went on to play in two further matches for the side that season.

In September 2023, the Melbourne Stars announced that they had signed Illingworth for the upcoming WBBL season. She played her debut match against the Sydney Sixers at North Sydney Oval taking her first wicket trapping Kate Pelle leg before wicket.

== International career ==
In December 2022, Illingworth was named in the Australia Under-19 squad for the 2023 ICC Under-19 Women's T20 World Cup. She was ever-present for the side at the tournament, taking four wickets at an average of 20.25 in her six matches. She was named Player of the Match in Australia's Super Six victory over India, in which she took 2/12 from her two overs.
