= Hasrat Gill =

Australian cricketer

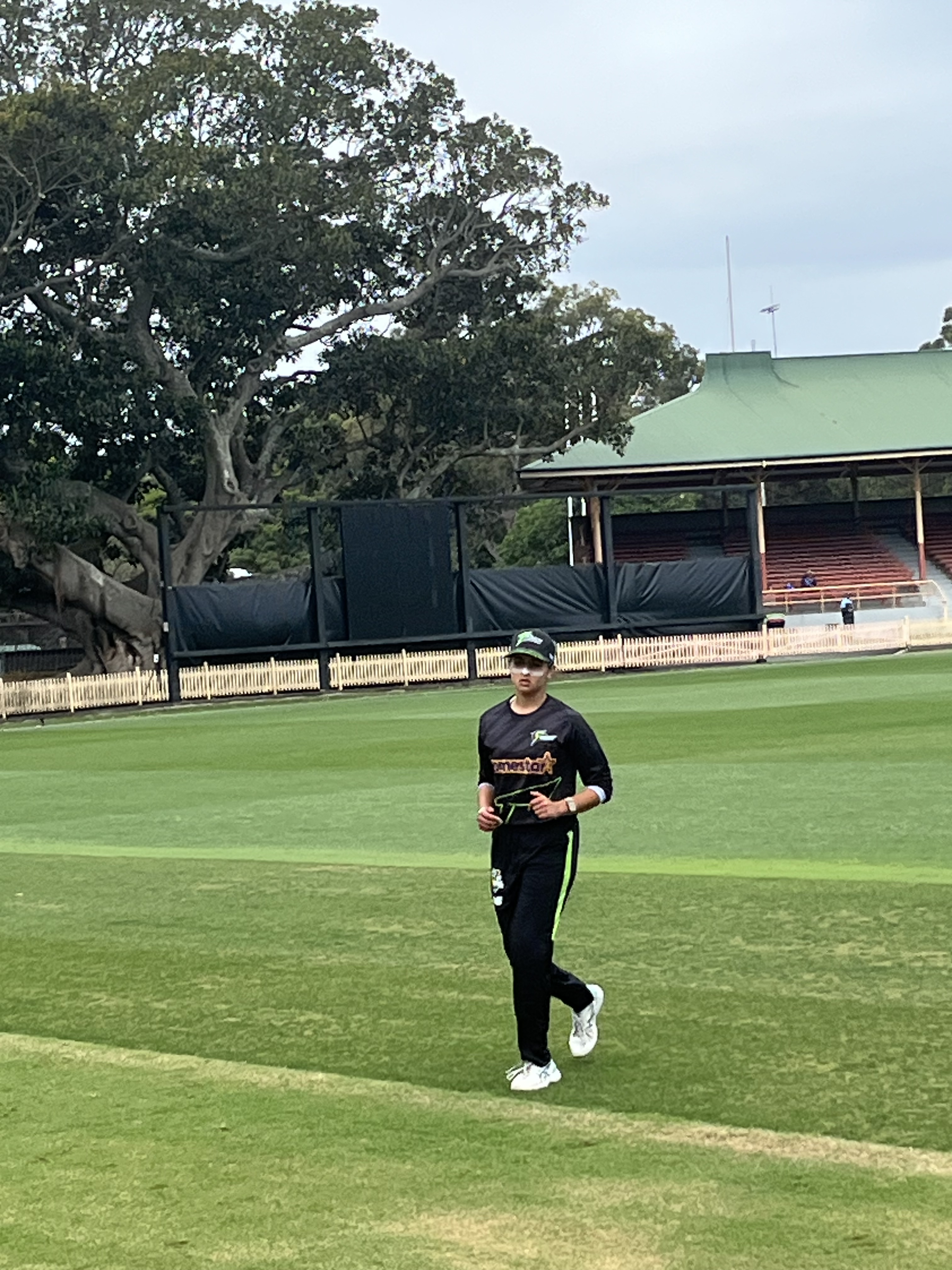
- Singh with the Sydney Thunder during 2025 T20 Spring Challenge

Personal information
- Born: 9 November 2005 (age 21); Amritsar, Punjab, India
- Batting: Left-handed
- Bowling: Right-arm leg break
- Role: All-rounder

Domestic team information
- Years: Team
- 2024/25–present: Melbourne Stars (squad no. 18)

Career statistics
Competition	WT20
Matches	4
Runs scored	3
Batting average	3.00
100s/50s	0/0
Top score	3
Balls bowled	60
Wickets	3
Bowling average	21.00
5 wickets in innings	0
10 wickets in match	0
Best bowling	3/12
Catches/stumpings	0/–
- Source: ESPNcricinfo, 16 October 2024

Hasrat Gill (born 9 November 2005) is an Australian cricketer who plays for the Melbourne Stars and Victoria. An all-rounder, she plays as a left-handed batter and a right-arm leg spin bowler.

== Career ==
In February 2024, Gill was named as part of an Under-19 tri-series against New Zealand and Sri Lanka. She was named as part of the Victoria women's squad ahead of the 2024–25 Women's National Cricket League season. On 13 October 2024, Gill made her Twenty20 debut for the Stars in the 2024 T20 Spring Challenge against the Sydney Thunder, taking 3/12.
