= Olivia Henry =

Australian cricketer

Personal information
- Full name: Olivia Henry
- Born: 27 January 2004 (age 22)
- Batting: Right-handed
- Bowling: Right-arm off break
- Role: Batter

Domestic team information
- Years: Team
- 2022/23–present: Victoria
- 2022/23–present: Melbourne Stars

Career statistics
Competition	WLA	WT20
Matches	29	10
Runs scored	493	33
Batting average	19.72	5.50
100s/50s	0/0	0/0
Top score	42	24
Catches/stumpings	7/–	2/–
- Source: CricketArchive, 23 February 2026

Olivia Henry (born 27 January 2004) is an Australian cricketer who currently plays for Victoria in the Women's National Cricket League (WNCL) and Melbourne Stars in the Women's Big Bash League (WBBL). She plays as a right-handed batter.

== Domestic career ==
Henry plays grade cricket for Ringwood Cricket Club.

In May 2022, Henry received her first professional contract, signing with Victoria for the upcoming 2022–23 Women's National Cricket League season. In September 2022, she was added to the Melbourne Stars squad for the upcoming 2022–23 Women's Big Bash League season. She made her debut for Melbourne Stars on 20 November 2022, but did not bat or bowl.

In December 2022, Henry played for Victoria in the Cricket Australia Under-19 National Female Championships, and was the fourth-highest run-scorer in the competition. She made her debut for the senior Victoria team on 17 January 2022, against Queensland, scoring five runs. She went on to play six matches overall for the side that season, scoring 162 runs at an average of 27.00.

== International career ==
In December 2022, Henry was named as a non-travelling reserve for the Australia Under-19 squad for the 2023 ICC Under-19 Women's T20 World Cup.
