= Sophie Reid =

Australian cricketer

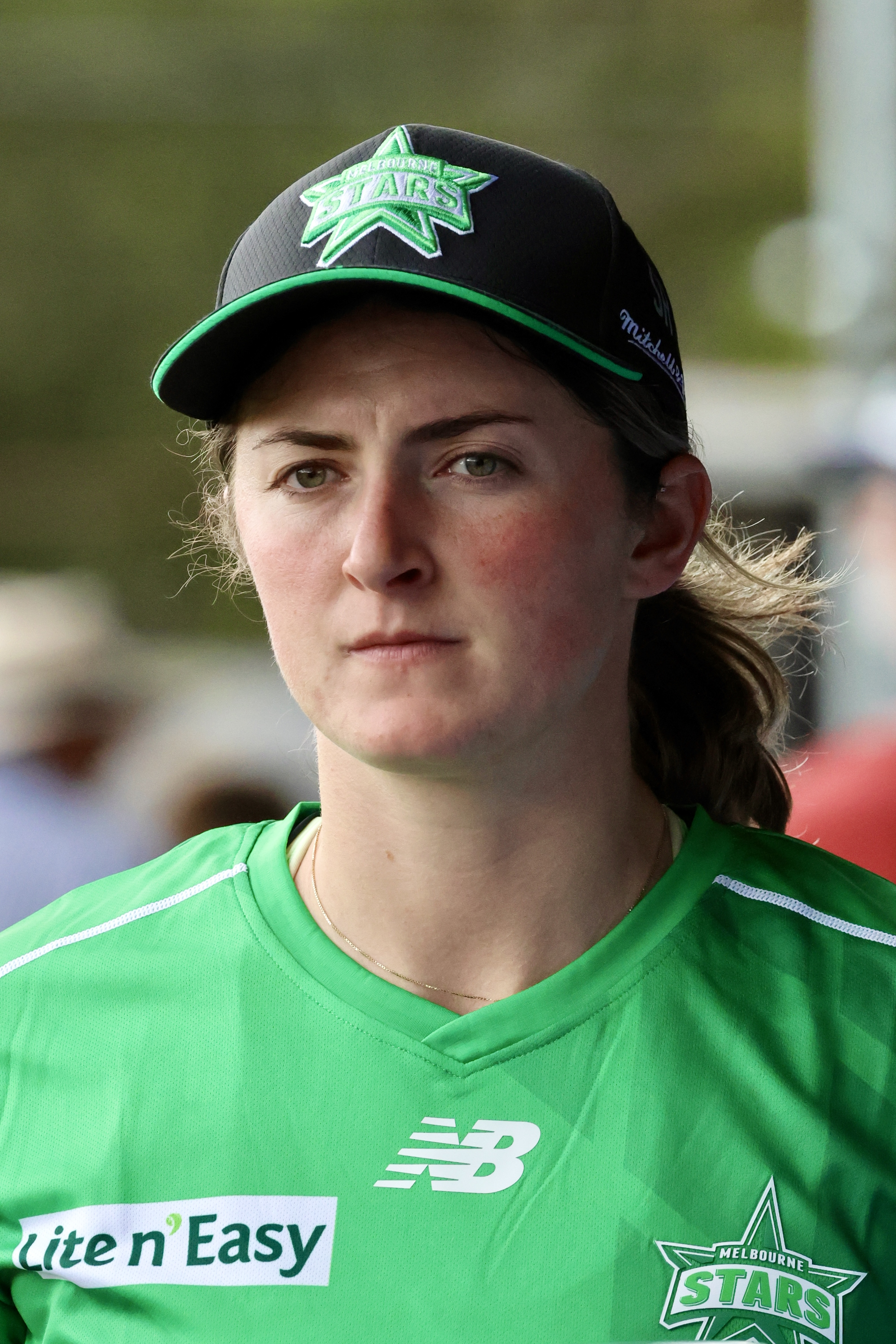
- Reid in 2025

Personal information
- Full name: Sophie Reid
- Born: 28 August 1997 (age 29)
- Batting: Left-handed
- Role: Wicket-keeper

Domestic team information
- Years: Team
- 2021/22–present: Victoria
- 2022/23–present: Melbourne Stars

Career statistics
Competition	WLA	WT20
Matches	39	27
Runs scored	1311	231
Batting average	33.62	9.86
100s/50s	1/8	0/0
Top score	106	46*
Catches/stumpings	6/2	6/2
- Source: CricketArchive, 3 March 2023

Sophie Reid (born 28 August 1997) is an Australian cricketer who plays as a left-handed batter and wicket-keeper for Victoria in the Women's National Cricket League (WNCL) and Melbourne Stars in the Women's Big Bash League (WBBL).

== Domestic career ==
Reid plays grade cricket for Carlton Cricket Club, and in 2022 became the first woman to play in the club's men's section. She made her debut for Victoria on 2 March 2022, against Tasmania in the WNCL, scoring 22 from 30 balls opening the batting. Overall, she played three matches for the side that season. She played nine matches for the side in the 2022–23 Women's National Cricket League season, scoring 195 runs at an average of 21.66. She made her maiden List A half-century in February 2023, scoring 73 against Western Australia. She was also ever-present for Melbourne Stars in the 2022–23 WBBL, scoring 77 runs at an average of 12.83.
