= Annabel Sutherland =

Australian cricketer (born 2001)

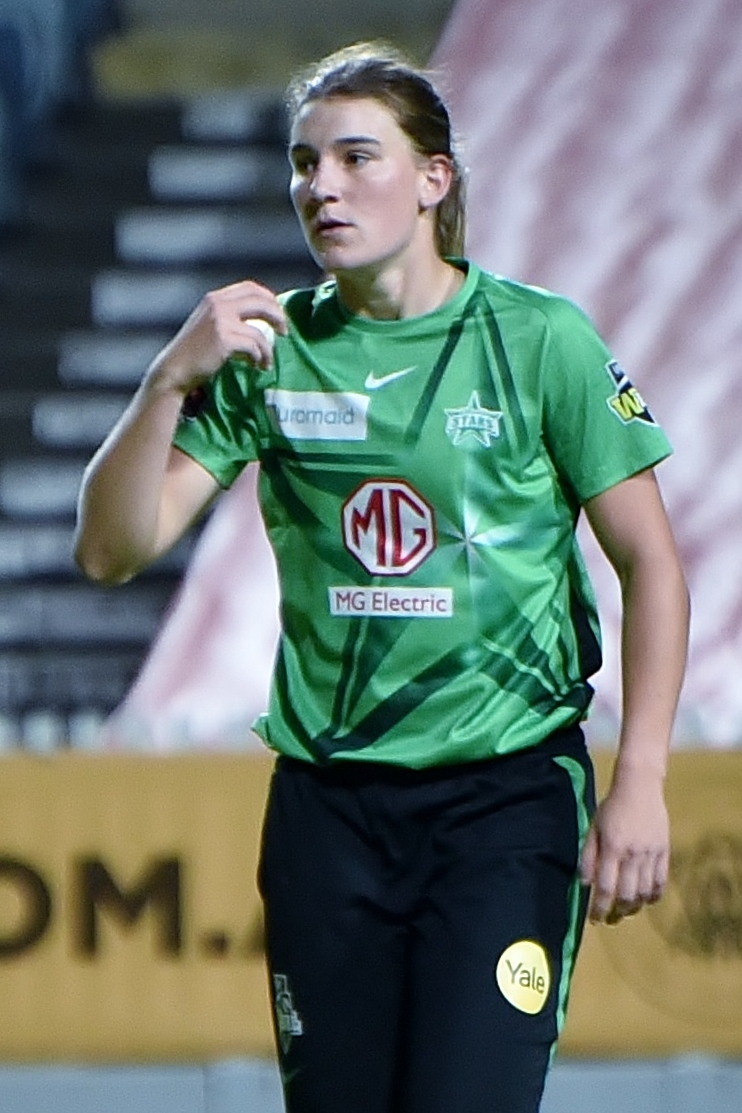
- Sutherland playing T20 cricket with Melbourne Stars in October 2022

Personal information
- Full name: Annabel Jane Sutherland
- Born: 12 October 2001 (age 25); East Melbourne, Victoria, Australia
- Batting: Right-handed
- Bowling: Right arm medium-fast
- Role: All-rounder
- Relatives: James Sutherland (father); Will Sutherland (brother)

International information
- National side: Australia (2020–present)
- Test debut (cap 179): 30 September 2021 v India
- Last Test: 1 February 2025 v England
- ODI debut (cap 143): 3 October 2020 v New Zealand
- Last ODI: 12 October 2025 v India
- T20I debut (cap 53): 1 February 2020 v England
- Last T20I: 26 March 2025 v New Zealand
- T20I shirt no.: 14

Domestic team information
- Years: Team
- 2016/17: Melbourne Renegades (squad no. 3)
- 2017/18–present: Victoria (squad no. 3)
- 2017/18–present: Melbourne Stars (squad no. 3)
- 2022: Welsh Fire
- 2023: Gujarat Giants
- 2024–2025: Delhi Capitals
- 2024–2025: Northern Superchargers
- 2026: Sunrisers Leeds

Career statistics
Competition	WTest	WODI	WT20I	LA
Matches	6	45	45	77
Runs scored	586	870	191	1,828
Batting average	83.71	37.82	11.93	38.08
100s/50s	3/0	3/3	0/0	5/6
Top score	210	110	23*	111
Balls bowled	693	1,440	715	2,594
Wickets	13	53	40	86
Bowling average	29.30	20.60	19.20	23.74
5 wickets in innings	0	1	0	1
10 wickets in match	0	0	0	0
Best bowling	3/19	5/40	4/8	5/40
Catches/stumpings	4/–	31/–	26/–	48/–
Medal record
Women's Cricket
Representing Australia
Commonwealth Games
Gold medal – first place	2022 Birmingham
World Cup
Winner	2022 New Zealand
T20 World Cup
Winner	2020 Australia
Winner	2023 South Africa
Winner	2026 England & Wales
- Source: CricketArchive, 14 October 2025

Annabel Jane Sutherland (born 12 October 2001) is an Australian cricketer who plays for the Australia women's national team as an all-rounder. At the domestic level, she plays for Victoria in the Women's National Cricket League and the Melbourne Stars in the Women's Big Bash League.

== Early and personal life ==
Annabel Jane Sutherland was born 12 October 2001 in East Melbourne, Victoria, Australia. She is the daughter of former head of Cricket Australia, James, and sister of Victorian all–rounder, Will. She also played Australian Rules football. She attended Methodist Ladies’ College. Growing up, played for the East Malvern Tooronga Cricket Club in grade cricket.

== Domestic career ==
=== Big Bash League ===
She made her debut for the Melbourne Renegades during the 2016–17 season. At 15 years old, she was the youngest player to feature in the Big Bash at the time. She moved to the Melbourne Stars the year after. She became the captain of the team in the 2024 season.

=== The Hundred ===
In April 2022, she was bought by the Welsh Fire for the 2022 season of The Hundred in England.

=== Women's Premier League ===
In the inaugural season of the Women's Premier League in 2023, Sutherland was bought by Gujarat Giants. She moved to the Delhi Capitals in 2024.

== International career ==
Sutherland had played for the Australia in both the U-15 and U-19 cricket teams. In April 2019, Cricket Australia awarded her with a contract with the National Performance Squad ahead of the 2019–20 season.

In January 2020, Sutherland was named in Australia's squads for the 2020 Australia women's Tri-Nation Series and the 2020 ICC Women's T20 World Cup. She made her Women's Twenty20 International (WT20I) debut for Australia, against England in the tri-series, on 1 February 2020. In April 2020, Cricket Australia awarded Sutherland with a central contract ahead of the 2020–21 season. She made her Women's One Day International (WODI) debut for Australia, against New Zealand, on 3 October 2020.

In August 2021, Sutherland was named in Australia's squad for their series against India, which included a one-off day/night Test match as part of the tour. Sutherland made her Test debut on 30 September 2021, for Australia against India.

In January 2022, Sutherland was named in Australia's squad for their series against England to contest the Women's Ashes. Later the same month, she was named in Australia's team for the 2022 Women's Cricket World Cup in New Zealand. In May 2022, Sutherland was named in Australia's team for the cricket tournament at the 2022 Commonwealth Games in Birmingham, England.

In June 2023, in the one-off Test against England in the Women's Ashes, Sutherland scored her maiden Test century, scoring 137 not out from 184 balls in the first innings. The century came off 148 balls, the fastest Test century for an Australian woman, and fourth-fastest overall.

In July 2023, Sutherland scored her maiden white-ball century, scoring 109 not out in the 3rd ODI against Ireland. In February 2024, Sutherland became the ninth women's player to record a test double century, ultimately scoring 210 and taking match figures of 5/30 against South Africa.

She was named in the Australia squad for the 2024 ICC Women's T20 World Cup and the 2025 Women's Ashes series. In January 2025, she became the first woman to score a century in a Test match at the Melbourne Cricket Ground.

== International centuries ==
Sutherland has recorded six international centuries. She scored the first women's Test century at the Melbourne Cricket Ground in January 2025, scoring 163 runs.

Test centuries
No	Runs	Against	Pos.	Inn.	Test	Venue	H/A	Date	Result	Ref
1	137 not out	England	8	1	1/1	Trent Bridge, Nottingham	Away	22 June 2023	Won	
2	210	South Africa	6	2	1/1	WACA Ground, Perth	Home	15 February 2024	Won	
3	163	England	3	2	1/1	Melbourne Cricket Ground	Home	30 January 2025	Won	

ODI centuries
No.	Runs	Against	Pos.	Inn.	S/R	Venue	H/A/N	Date	Result	Ref
1	109 not out	Ireland	2	1	107.92	Castle Avenue, Dublin	Away	28 July 2023	Won	
2	110	India	5	1	115.78	WACA Ground, Perth	Home	11 December 2024	Won	
3	105 not out	New Zealand	5	1	129.62	Basin Reserve, Wellington	Away	21 December 2024	Won (D/L)	
