= Nicole Faltum =

Australian cricketer (born 2000)

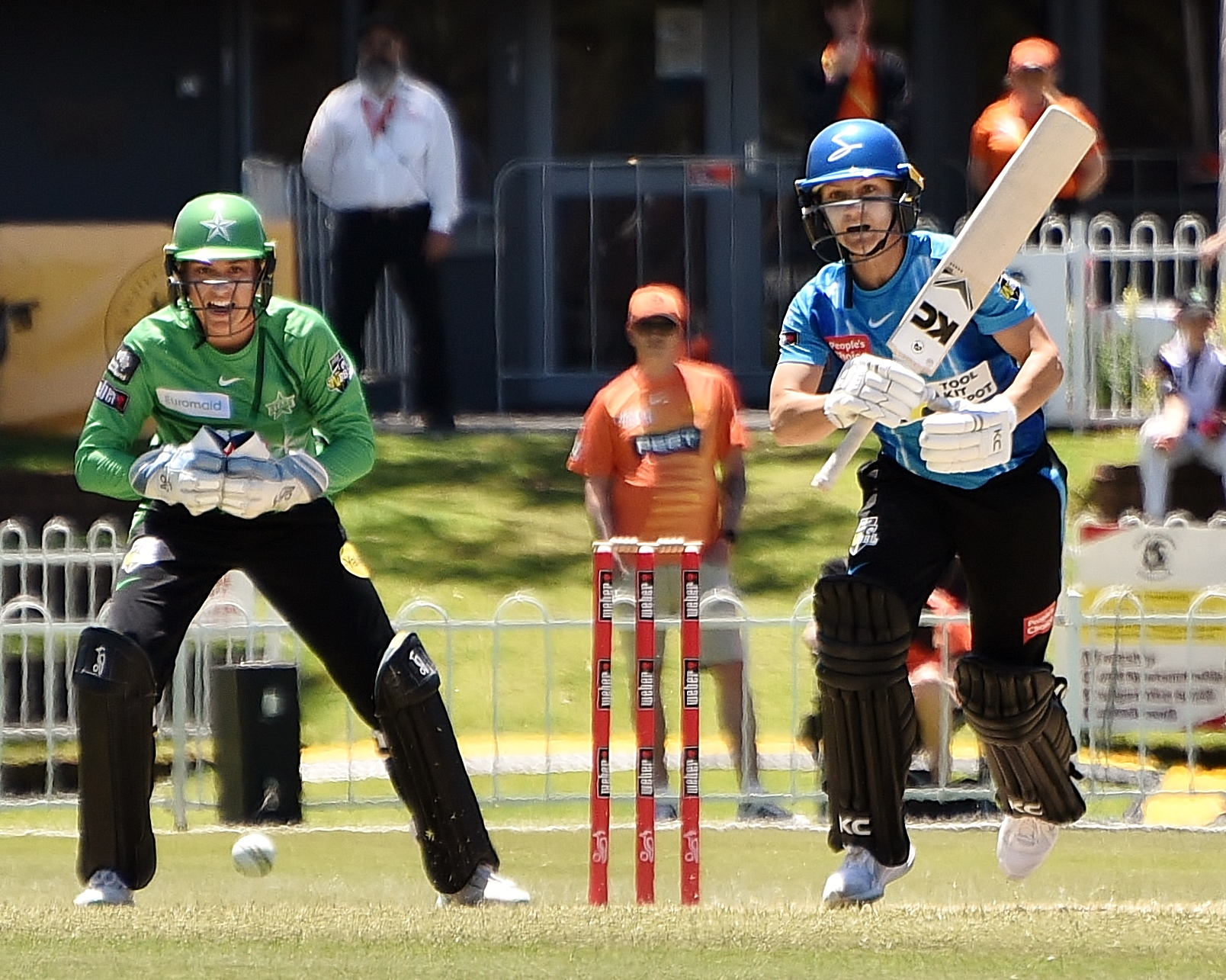
- Faltum keeping for Melbourne Stars in November 2022

Personal information
- Full name: Nicole Maria Faltum
- Born: 17 June 2000 (age 26) (Note: Date of birth listed as 17 June on CricketArchive and 17 January on ESPNcricinfo); Traralgon, Victoria, Australia
- Batting: Right-handed
- Bowling: Right-arm leg break
- Role: Wicket-keeper

Domestic team information
- Years: Team
- 2017/18–present: Victoria
- 2017/18–2023/24: Melbourne Stars
- 2023–present: Sussex
- 2023: Southern Vipers
- 2024/25–present: Melbourne Renegades

Career statistics
Competition	WLA	WT20
Matches	91	128
Runs scored	1,931	984
Batting average	27.58	17.26
100s/50s	2/12	0/2
Top score	107*	66*
Catches/stumpings	78/22	53/34
- Source: CricketArchive, 23 February 2026

Nicole Maria Faltum (born 17 June 2000) is an Australian cricketer who plays as a wicket-keeper and right-handed batter for Victoria in the Women's National Cricket League (WNCL) and the Melbourne Renegades in the Women's Big Bash League (WBBL). She played for the Stars in the final of the 2020–21 WBBL season, which they ultimately lost to the Sydney Thunder.

In January 2022, Faltum was named in Australia's A squad for their series against England A, with the matches being played alongside the Women's Ashes. She played for Sussex in the 2023 Women's Twenty20 Cup. Later that season, she joined Southern Vipers.
