= Rhys McKenna =

Australian cricketer

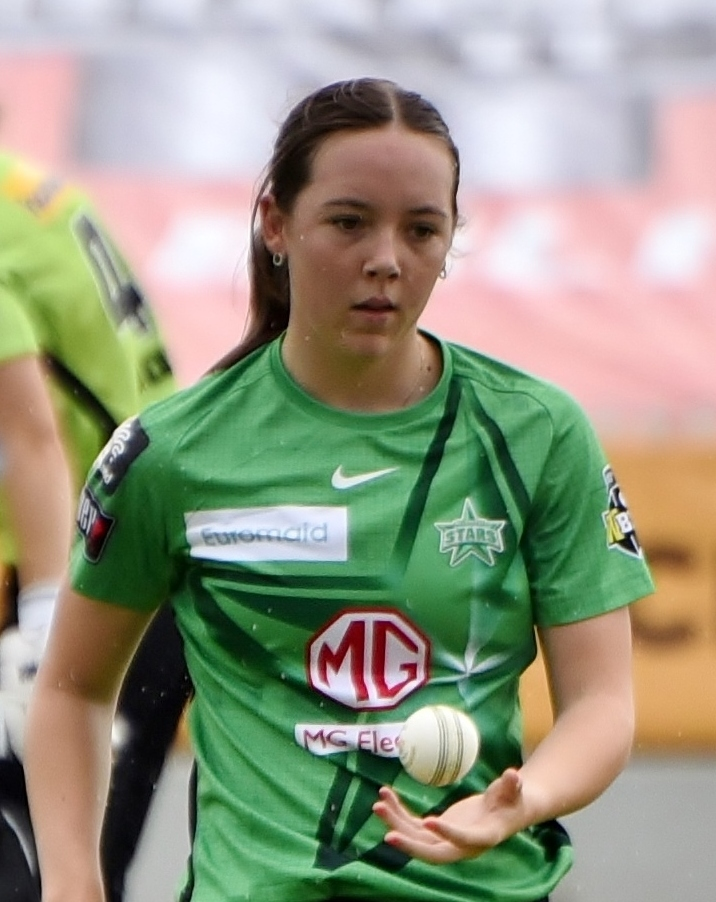
- McKenna playing for the Melbourne Stars in 2022

Personal information
- Full name: Rhys MacArthur McKenna
- Born: 17 August 2004 (age 22); Benoni, Gauteng, South Africa
- Nickname: Rhysie
- Batting: Right-handed
- Bowling: Right-arm fast-medium
- Role: Bowler

Domestic team information
- Years: Team
- 2021/22–present: Melbourne Stars
- 2021/22–present: Victoria

Career statistics
Competition	WLA	WT20
Matches	33	59
Runs scored	497	438
Batting average	15.53	12.51
100s/50s	0/2	0/2
Top score	62	52
Balls bowled	541	343
Wickets	12	19
Bowling average	39.08	24.42
5 wickets in innings	0	0
10 wickets in match	0	0
Best bowling	4/43	3/18
Catches/stumpings	9/–	13/–
- Source: CricketArchive, 18 March 2026

Rhys MacArthur McKenna (born 17 August 2004) is an Australian cricketer who plays as a right-arm fast-medium bowler and right-handed batter for Victoria in the Women's National Cricket League (WNCL) and the Melbourne Stars in the Women's Big Bash League (WBBL). She made her professional debut in the first match of the 2021–22 WBBL for the Stars against Sydney Sixers, bowling one over for nine runs and taking the wicket of Ellyse Perry. She plays club cricket for Prahran.

== International career ==
In December 2022, McKenna was selected in the Australia under-19 squad for the 2023 ICC Under-19 Women's T20 World Cup.
