= Melbourne Stars (WBBL) =

Australian Twenty20 cricket team

- League: Women's Big Bash League

Personnel
- Captain: Meg Lanning
- Coach: Richard Pyrah

Team information
- City: Melbourne
- Colours: Green
- Home ground: CitiPower Centre

History
- Twenty20 debut: 5 December 2015
- WBBL wins: 0
- Official website: Melbourne Stars

The Melbourne Stars are an Australian women's Twenty20 cricket team based in Melbourne, Victoria. They are one of two teams from Melbourne to compete in the Women's Big Bash League, the other being the Melbourne Renegades. To date, the Stars' best performance occurred in WBBL|06 when they ended the regular season as minor premiers before ultimately finishing as runners-up.

On 2 June 2026, it was reported that the brands of the Stars and the Melbourne Renegades would be merged into a new franchise, utilising the Stars' existing WBBL license. Nick Cummins, the CEO of Cricket Victoria (CV), has described the new team as "just a merger of brands and staff" and "not a merger of the teams". Two weeks later, it was confirmed that both the Stars and the Renegades would compete in the upcoming 2026–27 season under their existing names.

== History ==
=== Formation ===
One of eight founding WBBL teams, the Melbourne Stars are aligned with the men's team of the same name. At the official WBBL launch on 10 July 2015, Meg Lanning was unveiled as the Stars' first-ever player signing. Lanning would also become the team's inaugural captain, while David Hemp was appointed as the inaugural coach.

The Stars played their first match on 5 December against the Brisbane Heat at the Junction Oval, winning by 20 runs.

=== Rivalries ===
==== Hobart Hurricanes ====
The Stars and Hobart Hurricanes have combined to produce an inordinate number of matches with close finishes, including:

- 16 January 2016, Blacktown ISP Oval: On a crumbling pitch, criticised earlier in the Australian summer for its sub-standard preparation, the Stars crawled to a first innings total of 7/96 before fighting back to have the Hurricanes at 4/49 in the twelfth over of the run chase. An unbroken stand of 48 runs from the next 51 balls between Corinne Hall and Amy Satterthwaite steered Hobart out of trouble, with Hall scoring a single on the final delivery to secure victory for the 'Canes.
- 20 January 2017, Blundstone Arena: In a rain-affected encounter, Hobart posted a first innings total of 3/115 off 14 overs. Chasing a revised target of 98 from twelve overs, Melbourne lost 4/7 late in the match (including the wicket of Emma Inglis for 51 off 31) to leave a required twelve runs from the last two balls for victory. Jess Cameron proceeded to hit a six off the penultimate legal delivery before Hurricanes off-spinner Amy Satterthwaite bowled a front-foot no-ball while also conceding a four on what would have otherwise been the final ball of the innings. With Satterthwaite having to bowl the final delivery again, Cameron scored the remaining single needed to pull off an unlikely six-wicket win for the Stars.
- 21 January 2017, Blundstone Arena: The following morning, on the last day of the WBBL|02 regular season, the Stars and Hurricanes met again—this time in what was effectively a quarter-final knockout match with the winner progressing to the semi-finals and the loser being eliminated from the tournament. Meg Lanning made 81 runs for the Stars in the first innings, earning Player of the Match honours, but was dismissed in the 19th over by a stunning Julie Hunter catch at square leg. A spell of 3/11 off four overs by Kristen Beams was not enough to defend the target of 136 as the Hurricanes scored the winning runs (through Corinne Hall again) with four wickets in hand and one ball remaining.

==== Melbourne Renegades ====
Noteworthy matches between the Stars and their cross-town rivals, the Melbourne Renegades, include:

- 1 January 2017, Melbourne Cricket Ground: Played in front of a reported crowd of 24,547—as part of a double-header with the men's BBL, setting a new record for the highest non-standalone WBBL attendance—the rain-affected match ended in anticlimactic fashion with the Renegades adjudged nine-wicket winners via the Duckworth–Lewis–Stern method. Stars captain Meg Lanning initially protested the ruling with officiating umpires, claiming she had been given false information about the par score by the match referee.
- 20 January 2018, Melbourne Cricket Ground: Chasing 119 for victory, Renegades captain Amy Satterthwaite—who looked to have been run out earlier in the innings and left the field, but was recalled after TV replays showed wicket-keeper Nicole Faltum had dislodged the bails prematurely—hit a six off the final delivery against the bowling of Georgia Elwiss to tie the game. With scores still level after the super over, the Stars were awarded the win on the boundary count back rule.
- 29 December 2018, Docklands Stadium: The Renegades recorded the second one-wicket victory in the league's history when Lea Tahuhu, a fast bowler not known for her batting ability, hit the winning single off leg-spinning Stars captain Kristen Beams with just one ball to spare. Courtney Webb, on 21 not out, was the set batter at the non-striker's end.

== Captaincy records ==
There have been six captains in the Stars' history, including matches featuring an acting captain.

Captain	Span	M	Won	Lost	Tied	NR	W–L%
Meg Lanning	2015–23	68	30	33	0	5	47.62
Kristen Beams	2017–19	19	7	12	0	0	36.84
Erin Osborne	2018–19	10	4	5	0	1	44.44
Elyse Villani	2019	14	2	12	0	0	14.29
Nicole Faltum	2022	14	5	6	0	3	45.45
Annabel Sutherland	2023–25	24	10	12	0	2	45.45

== Season summaries ==
Chart of yearly table positions for Melbourne Stars in WBBL

Season	W–L	Pos.	Finals	Coach	Captain	Most Runs	Most Wickets	Most Valuable Player	Refs
2015–16	7–7	5th	DNQ	David Hemp	Meg Lanning	Meg Lanning – 560*	Morna Nielsen – 18	Meg Lanning*	
2016–17	7–7	5th	DNQ	David Hemp	Meg Lanning (Note: Kristen Beams stood in as acting captain for one game.)	Meg Lanning – 502*	Gemma Triscari – 13	Meg Lanning	
2017–18	5–9	7th	DNQ	David Hemp	Kristen Beams (Note: Erin Osborne stood in as acting captain for two games.)	Lizelle Lee – 349	Erin Osborne – 15	Erin Osborne	
2018–19	5–8	7th	DNQ	David Hemp	Kristen Beams (Note: Erin Osborne stood in as acting captain for eight games.)	Lizelle Lee – 276	Alana King – 15	Alana King	
2019	2–12	8th	DNQ	David Hemp	Elyse Villani	Lizelle Lee – 475	Erin Osborne – 11	Lizelle Lee	
2020	8–3*	1st*	RU	Trent Woodhill	Meg Lanning	Meg Lanning – 493	Nat Sciver – 19	Nat Sciver	
2021	5–7	5th	DNQ	Jarrad Loughman	Meg Lanning	Elyse Villani – 439	Kim Garth – 15	Kim Garth	
2022	5–6	6th	DNQ	Jonathan Batty	Nicole Faltum	Annabel Sutherland – 304	Annabel Sutherland – 21	Annabel Sutherland	
2023	6–8	7th	DNQ	Jonathan Batty	Meg Lanning	Annabel Sutherland – 288	Sophie Day – 27*	Annabel Sutherland	
2024	2–7	8th	DNQ	Jonathan Batty	Annabel Sutherland	Meg Lanning – 158	Kim Garth – 10	Marizanne Kapp	
2025	5–4	4th	KF	Andrew Christie	Annabel Sutherland	Meg Lanning – 479	Sophie Day – 16	Meg Lanning	

Legend
DNQ	Did not qualify	SF	Semi-finalists	*	Led the league
EF	Lost the Eliminator	RU	Runners-up	^	League record
KF	Lost the Knockout	CF	Lost the Challenger	C	Champions

== Home grounds ==
Venue	Games hosted by season											
Venue	01	02	03	04	05	06	07	08	09	10	11	Total
Casey Fields	–	2	2	2	–	N/A (Note: The Stars did not host any games in WBBL|06 and WBBL|07 due to state border restrictions related to the COVID-19 pandemic.)		–	1	–	–	7
Eastern Oval	–	–	–	–	–	N/A		1	–	–	–	1
Jubilee Park	–	–	–	–	–	N/A		–	1	–	–	1
CitiPower Centre	4	–	–	1	6	N/A		2	3	3	4	23
Melbourne Cricket Ground	2	2	4	2	–	N/A		–	1	1	–	12
Ted Summerton Reserve	–	–	–	–	–	N/A		2	–	–	–	2
Toorak Park	–	1	–	–	–	N/A		–	–	–	–	1

== Current squad ==
The squad of the Melbourne Stars for WBBL|12 as of 26 October 2026.

- Players with international caps are listed in **bold**.

No.	Name	Nat.	Birth Date	Batting Style	Bowling Style	Additional Info.
Batters
7	**Meg Lanning**	Australia	25 March 1992 (age 34)	Right-handed	Right-arm medium	Captain
24	Indigo Noble	Australia	27 December 2003 (age 22)	Right-handed	Right-arm medium	
10	**Naomi Stalenberg**	Australia	18 April 1994 (age 32)	Right-handed	Right-arm medium	
All-rounders
22	**Charlie Dean**	England	22 December 2000 (age 25)	Right-handed	Right-arm off spin	International Signing
34	**Kim Garth**	Australia	25 April 1996 (age 30)	Right-handed	Right-arm fast	
28	**Dani Gibson**	England	30 April 2001 (age 25)	Right-handed	Right-arm medium	International Signing
74	Carly Leeson	Australia	9 November 1998 (age 27)	Right-handed	Right-arm medium	
11	Rhys McKenna	Australia	17 August 2004 (age 22)	Right-handed	Left-arm fast	
29	Zoe Samuel	Australia	2 February 2007 (age 19)	Right-handed	Right-arm medium	
3	**Annabel Sutherland**	Australia	12 October 2001 (age 25)	Right-handed	Right-arm fast	
Wicket-keepers
40	**Amy Jones**	England	13 June 1993 (age 33)	Right-handed	—N/a	International Signing
Bowlers
6	Sophie Day	Australia	2 September 1998 (age 28)	Left-handed	Left-arm orthodox	
13	Maisy Gibson	Australia	14 September 1996 (age 30)	Left-handed	Right-arm leg spin	
16	Georgia Prestwidge	Australia	17 December 1997 (age 28)	Right-handed	Right-arm medium	

== Players ==
=== Australian representatives ===
(Australia) The following is a list of cricketers who have played for the Melbourne Stars after making their debut in the national women's team (the period they spent as both a Melbourne Stars squad member and an Australian-capped player is in brackets):

- Kristen Beams (WBBL|01–05)
- Meg Lanning (WBBL|01–02, 06–12)
- Jess Cameron (WBBL|03)
- Erin Osborne (WBBL|03–07)
- Holly Ferling (WBBL|04–06)
- Elyse Villani (WBBL|05–07)
- Annabel Sutherland (WBBL|06–12)
- Kim Garth (WBBL|09–12)
- Naomi Stalenberg (WBBL|12)

=== Overseas marquees ===
- (South Africa) Mignon du Preez (WBBL|01, 03–06)
- (New Zealand) Hayley Jensen (WBBL|01) (Note: Jensen was deemed a local player for the Stars in WBBL|02 due to her permanent residence in Australia and a lack of recent international cricket appearances.)
- (New Zealand) Morna Nielsen (WBBL|01–02)
- (England) Nat Sciver-Brunt (WBBL|01–02, 06)
- (England) Danielle Hazell (WBBL|02)
- (England) Georgia Elwiss (WBBL|03–04)
- (South Africa) Lizelle Lee (WBBL|03–05)
- (New Zealand) Katey Martin (WBBL|03–05)
- (England) Katherine Brunt (WBBL|06)
- (New Zealand) Rosemary Mair (WBBL|06)
- (England) Maia Bouchier (WBBL|07, 09, 11)
- (Republic of Ireland) Kim Garth (WBBL|07) (Note: Garth was classed as a local player for the Stars in WBBL|08 due to her permanent residence in Australia and a lack of recent international cricket appearances for Ireland.)
- (England) Linsey Smith (WBBL|07)
- (England) Alice Capsey (WBBL|08–09)
- (England) Bess Heath (WBBL|08)
- (India) Jemimah Rodrigues (WBBL|08)
- (England) Lauren Winfield-Hill (WBBL|08)
- (England) Sophia Dunkley (WBBL|09)
- (India) Yastika Bhatia (WBBL|10)
- (South Africa) Marizanne Kapp (WBBL|10–11)
- (India) Deepti Sharma (WBBL|10)
- (England) Dani Gibson (WBBL|11–12)
- (England) Amy Jones (WBBL|11–12)
- (England) Charlie Dean (WBBL|12)

=== Associate rookies ===
- (China) Wu Juan (WBBL|01)
- (Scotland) Kathryn Bryce (WBBL|02)
- (Bangladesh) Khadija Tul Kubra (WBBL|03)

== Honours ==
- Champions: 0
- Runners-Up: 1 – WBBL|06
- Minor Premiers: 1 – WBBL|06
- Finals Appearances: 2 – WBBL|06, WBBL|11
- Wooden Spoons: 2 – WBBL|05, WBBL|10

== Statistics and awards ==
=== Team stats ===
- Win–loss record:

Opposition	M	Won	Lost	Tied	NR	W–L%
Adelaide Strikers	20	9	9	0	2	50
Brisbane Heat	21	8	11	0	2	42.11
Hobart Hurricanes	21	8	13	0	0	38.1
Melbourne Renegades	22	9	11	0	2	45
Perth Scorchers	22	10	12	0	0	45.45
Sydney Sixers	22	10	11	0	1	47.62
Sydney Thunder	21	4	13	0	4	23.53
Total	149	58	80	0	11	42.03

- Highest score in an innings: 4/219 (20 overs) vs Sydney Sixers, 20 November 2025
- Highest successful chase: 1/181 (19.3 overs) vs Adelaide Strikers, 21 November 2021
- Lowest successful defence: 7/108 (20 overs) vs Sydney Thunder, 26 October 2021
- Largest victory:
  - Batting first: 111 runs vs Sydney Sixers, 20 November 2025
  - Batting second: 46 balls remaining vs Hobart Hurricanes, 1 November 2020
- Longest winning streak: 6 matches (1–14 November 2020)
- Longest losing streak: 6 matches (9–22 November 2024)

=== Individual stats ===
- Most runs: Meg Lanning – 2,726
- Highest score in an innings: Meg Lanning – 135 (79) vs Sydney Sixers, 20 November 2025
- Highest partnership: Meg Lanning and Rhys McKenna – 159 vs Sydney Sixers, 20 November 2025
- Most wickets: Annabel Sutherland – 100
- Best bowling figures in an innings: Sophie Day – 5/25 (4 overs) vs Sydney Sixers, 8 November 2023
- Hat-tricks taken: Gemma Triscari vs Sydney Thunder, 15 January 2016
- Most catches (fielder): Annabel Sutherland – 42
- Most dismissals (wicket-keeper): Nicole Faltum – 39 (23 catches, 16 stumpings)

=== Individual awards ===
- Player of the Match:
  - Meg Lanning – 16
  - Annabel Sutherland – 7
  - Sophie Day, Alana King, Erin Osborne, and Nat Sciver-Brunt – 3
  - Tess Flintoff, Kim Garth, Emma Inglis, Lizelle Lee, and Katie Mack – 2
  - Kristen Beams, Yastika Bhatia, Katherine Brunt, Jess Cameron, Alice Capsey, Mignon du Preez, Georgia Elwiss, Danielle Hazell, Amy Jones, Marizanne Kapp, Rhys McKenna, Sasha Moloney, Gemma Triscari, and Elyse Villani – 1
- WBBL Player of the Tournament: Meg Lanning – WBBL|01
- WBBL Team of the Tournament:
  - Meg Lanning (4) – WBBL|01, WBBL|02, WBBL|06, WBBL|11
  - Sophie Day (2) – WBBL|09, WBBL|11
  - Annabel Sutherland (2) – WBBL|08, WBBL|09
  - Morna Nielsen – WBBL|01
  - Kristen Beams – WBBL|02
  - Alana King – WBBL|06
  - Nat Sciver-Brunt – WBBL|06
  - Kim Garth – WBBL|11
- WBBL Young Gun Award: Tess Flintoff – WBBL|08

== Sponsors ==
Year	Kit Manufacturer	Chest Sponsor	Back Sponsor	Breast Sponsor	Sleeve Sponsor
2015–16	Majestic Athletic	Rebel Sport	Antler	VicHealth	Rebel
2016–17	Majestic Athletic	Rebel Sport	Optus	Yes	Rebel
2017–18	Majestic Athletic	Rebel Sport	Optus	Yes	Rebel
2018–19	Majestic Athletic	Yes	Optus	Yes	Rebel
2019–20	Majestic Athletic	Yes	Optus	Yes	Yes
2020–21	Majestic Athletic	MG	MG	Belling	Dimplex
2021–22	Nike	MG	MG	Belling	Aussie Broadband
2022–23	Nike	MG	MG	Euromaid	Aussie Broadband
2023–24	Nike	Dodo Services	Wish	Euromaid	Big4 Holiday Parks
2024–25	Nike	Dodo Services	Five:am Organic	13cabs	Sharp EIT Solutions
2025-26	New Balance	Dodo Services	Intrepid	Lite n' Easy	Sharp EIT Solutions
2026-27	New Balance	Dodo Services	Intrepid	mycar Tyre & Auto	Old El Paso

== See also ==
- Melbourne Stars
- Hobart Hurricanes (WBBL)
- Melbourne Renegades
- Melbourne Renegades (WBBL)
- Victorian Cricket Association
- Victorian Spirit

== Notes ==
Transclusion maintenance
Check completeness of transclusions
Update source
