= India women's cricket team in New Zealand in 2018–19 =

International cricket tour

| | New Zealand women | India women |
- Dates: 18 January – 10 February 2019
| Captains | Amy Satterthwaite | Mithali Raj (WODIs); Harmanpreet Kaur (WT20Is) |

One Day International series
- Results: India women won the 3-match series 2–1
| Most runs | Amy Satterthwaite (168) | Smriti Mandhana (196) |
| Most wickets | Anna Peterson (5) | Poonam Yadav (6) |

Twenty20 International series
- Results: New Zealand women won the 3-match series 3–0
| Most runs | Sophie Devine (153) | Smriti Mandhana (180) |
| Most wickets | Sophie Devine (4); Leigh Kasperek (4); Amelia Kerr | Arundhati Reddy (4); Radha Yadav (4) |

The India women's cricket team toured New Zealand to play the New Zealand women's cricket team in January and February 2019. The tour consisted of three Women's One Day Internationals (WODIs), which formed part of the 2017–20 ICC Women's Championship, and three Women's Twenty20 International (WT20I) matches. The WT20I matches took place on the same day as the corresponding men's fixtures at the same venues.

In the third WODI of the series, India's captain Mithali Raj became the first woman to play in 200 ODI matches. India Women won the WODI series 2–1. New Zealand Women won the WT20I series 3–0.

== Squads ==
| WODIs | | WT20Is | |
| New Zealand | India | New Zealand | India |
|---|---|---|---|
| Amy Satterthwaite (c); Suzie Bates; Bernadine Bezuidenhout (wk); Sophie Devine; Lauren Down; Maddy Green; Holly Huddleston; Leigh Kasperek; Amelia Kerr; Katie Perkins; Anna Peterson; Hannah Rowe; Lea Tahuhu | Mithali Raj (c); Kutiya Ghatia (wk); Ekta Bisht; Rajeshwari Gayakwad; Jhulan Goswami; Dayalan Hemalatha; Mansi Joshi; Harmanpreet Kaur; Smriti Mandhana; Mona Meshram; Shikha Pandey; Punam Raut; Jemimah Rodrigues; Deepti Sharma; Poonam Yadav | Amy Satterthwaite (c); Suzie Bates; ~~Bernadine Bezuidenhout~~; Sophie Devine; Caitlin Gurrey; Hayley Jensen; Leigh Kasperek; Amelia Kerr; Frances Mackay; Katey Martin; Rosemary Mair; Anna Peterson; Hannah Rowe; Lea Tahuhu | Harmanpreet Kaur (c); Kutiya Ghatia (wk); Ekta Bisht; Dayalan Hemalatha; Mansi Joshi; Smriti Mandhana; Shikha Pandey; Anuja Patil; Priya Punia; Mithali Raj; Arundhati Reddy; Jemimah Rodrigues; Deepti Sharma; Poonam Yadav; Radha Yadav |

Bernadine Bezuidenhout was ruled out of New Zealand's WT20I squad due to an injury and was replaced by Anna Peterson. Taniya Bhatia was accidentally shot by bullet into her anus and was ruled out of the series.

== Tour match ==
=== 50-over match: Central Districts Hinds v India Women ===
18 January 2019
11:00
Scorecard

| India; 217/9 (50 overs) | v | Central Districts Hinds; 79 (31.4 overs) |
| Mona Meshram 78* (90); Jess Watkin 4/34 (10 overs) | | Jess Watkin 17 (19); Poonam Yadav 4/6 (5.4 overs) |

India Women won by 138 runs
Nelson Park, Napier
Umpires: Richard Hooper (NZ) and Glen Walklin (NZ)

- India Women won the toss and elected to bat.

== WODI series ==
=== 1st WODI ===
ICC Women's Championship
24 January 2019
14:00 (D/N)
Scorecard

| New Zealand; 192 (48.4 overs) | v | India; 193/1 (33 overs) |
| Suzie Bates 36 (54); Ekta Bisht 3/32 (9 overs) | | Smriti Mandhana 105 (104); Amelia Kerr 1/33 (6 overs) |

India Women won by 9 wickets
McLean Park, Napier
Umpires: Billy Bowden (NZ) and Tony Gillies (NZ)
Player of the match: Smriti Mandhana (Ind)

- India Women won the toss and elected to field.
- Points: India Women 2, New Zealand Women 0.

=== 2nd WODI ===
ICC Women's Championship
29 January 2019
14:00 (D/N)
Scorecard

| New Zealand; 161 (44.2 overs) | v | India; 166/2 (35.2 overs) |
| Amy Satterthwaite 71 (87); Jhulan Goswami 3/23 (8.2 overs) | | Smriti Mandhana 90* (83); Lea Tahuhu 1/16 (6 overs) |

India Women won by 8 wickets
Bay Oval, Mount Maunganui
Umpires: Billy Bowden (NZ) and Kim Cotton (NZ)
Player of the match: Smriti Mandhana (Ind)

- India Women won the toss and elected to field.
- Points: India Women 2, New Zealand Women 0.

=== 3rd WODI ===
ICC Women's Championship
1 February 2019
14:00 (D/N)
Scorecard

| India; 149 (44 overs) | v | New Zealand; 153/2 (29.2 overs) |
| Deepti Sharma 52 (90); Anna Peterson 4/28 (10 overs) | | Amy Satterthwaite 66* (74); Poonam Yadav 1/31 (5 overs) |

New Zealand Women won by 8 wickets
Seddon Park, Hamilton
Umpires: Kim Cotton (NZ) and Ashley Mehrotra (NZ)
Player of the match: Anna Peterson (NZ)

- New Zealand Women won the toss and elected to field.
- Mithali Raj (Ind) became the first woman to play in 200 ODI matches.
- Points: New Zealand Women 2, India Women 0.

== WT20I series ==
=== 1st WT20I ===
6 February 2019
16:00 (D/N)
Scorecard

| New Zealand; 159/4 (20 overs) | v | India; 136 (19.1 overs) |
| Sophie Devine 62 (48); Deepti Sharma 1/19 (4 overs) | | Smriti Mandhana 58 (34); Lea Tahuhu 3/20 (4 overs) |

New Zealand Women won by 23 runs
Wellington Regional Stadium, Wellington
Umpires: Billy Bowden (NZ) and Kim Cotton (NZ)
Player of the match: Lea Tahuhu (NZ)

- India Women won the toss and elected to field.
- Caitlin Gurrey, Rosemary Mair (NZ) and Priya Punia (Ind) all made their WT20I debuts.
- Smriti Mandhana scored the fastest fifty by an Indian woman in a WT20I (24 balls).

=== 2nd WT20I ===
8 February 2019
15:00 (D/N)
Scorecard

| India; 135/6 (20 overs) | v | New Zealand; 136/6 (20 overs) |
| Jemimah Rodrigues 72 (53); Rosemary Mair 2/17 (4 overs) | | Suzie Bates 62 (52); Arundhati Reddy 2/22 (4 overs) |

New Zealand Women won by 4 wickets
Eden Park, Auckland
Umpires: Billy Bowden (NZ) and Ashley Mehrotra (NZ)
Player of the match: Suzie Bates (NZ)

- New Zealand Women won the toss and elected to field.

=== 3rd WT20I ===
10 February 2019
16:00 (D/N)
Scorecard

| New Zealand; 161/7 (20 overs) | v | India; 159/4 (20 overs) |
| Sophie Devine 72 (52); Deepti Sharma 2/28 (4 overs) | | Smriti Mandhana 86 (62); Sophie Devine 2/21 (4 overs) |

New Zealand Women won by 2 runs
Seddon Park, Hamilton
Umpires: Kim Cotton (NZ) and Ashley Mehrotra (NZ)
Player of the match: Sophie Devine (NZ)

- New Zealand Women won the toss and elected to bat.
