= New Zealand women's cricket team against Pakistan in the UAE in 2017–18 =

International cricket tour

	Pakistan women	New Zealand women
- Dates: 31 October – 14 November 2017
Captains	Bismah Maroof	Suzie Bates

One Day International series
- Results: New Zealand women won the 3-match series 2–1
Most runs	Bismah Maroof (113); Nahida Khan (113)	Sophie Devine (167)
Most wickets	Sana Mir (7)	Amelia Kerr (6)

Twenty20 International series
- Results: New Zealand women won the 4-match series 4–0
Most runs	Nahida Khan (89)	Sophie Devine (158)
Most wickets	Sadia Yousuf (5)	Hannah Rowe (6)
- Player of the series: Sophie Devine (NZ)

The New Zealand women's cricket team played the Pakistan women's cricket team in the United Arab Emirates from 31 October to 14 November 2017. The tour consisted of three Women's One Day Internationals (WODIs) and four Women's Twenty20 Internationals (WT20Is). The WODI games were part of the 2017–20 ICC Women's Championship. It was the first time that New Zealand Women played an away series against Pakistan. Ahead of the series, Bismah Maroof was made captain of Pakistan women's ODI team, after Sana Mir was axed from the role. New Zealand Women won the WODI series 2–1 and the WT20I series 4–0.

== Squads ==
Pakistan	New Zealand
Bismah Maroof (c); Sidra Ameen; Aiman Anwer; Diana Baig; Iram Javed; Javeria Khan; Nahida Khan; Sana Mir; Sidra Nawaz (wk); Natalia Pervaiz; Aliya Riaz; Nashra Sandhu; Sadia Yousuf; Ayesha Zafar	Suzie Bates (c); Samantha Curtis; Sophie Devine; Maddy Green; Holly Huddleston; Leigh Kasperek; Amelia Kerr; Katey Martin (wk); Thamsyn Newton; Katie Perkins; Anna Peterson; Hannah Rowe; Amy Satterthwaite; Lea Tahuhu

== WODI series ==
=== 1st WODI ===
ICC Women's Championship
31 October 2017
09:30
Scorecard

New Zealand; 240/9 (50 overs)	v	Pakistan; 232 (48.3 overs)
Sophie Devine 103 (119); Sana Mir 3/33 (10 overs)		Javeria Khan 55 (73); Holly Huddleston 2/32 (10 overs)

New Zealand Women won by 8 runs
Sharjah Cricket Stadium, Sharjah
Umpires: Rashid Riaz (Pak) and Asif Yaqoob (Pak)
Player of the match: Sophie Devine (NZ)

- New Zealand Women won the toss and elected to bat.
- Points: New Zealand Women 2, Pakistan Women 0.

=== 2nd WODI ===
ICC Women's Championship
2 November 2017
10:00
Scorecard

Pakistan; 147 (49.1 overs)	v	New Zealand; 148/3 (24 overs)
Nahida Khan 39 (76); Amelia Kerr 3/35 (10 overs)		Sophie Devine 62 (48); Javeria Khan 2/6 (3 overs)

New Zealand Women won by 7 wickets
Sharjah Cricket Stadium, Sharjah
Umpires: Khalid Mahmood (Pak) and Rashid Riaz (Pak)
Player of the match: Sophie Devine (NZ)

- Pakistan Women won the toss and elected to bat.
- Points: New Zealand Women 2, Pakistan Women 0.

=== 3rd WODI ===
ICC Women's Championship
5 November 2017
10:00
Scorecard

New Zealand; 155 (43.4 overs)	v	Pakistan; 156/5 (48.5 overs)
Samantha Curtis 50 (77); Sana Mir 4/25 (8.4 overs)		Bismah Maroof 36* (69); Anna Peterson 2/25 (10 overs)

Pakistan Women won by 5 wickets
Sharjah Cricket Stadium, Sharjah
Umpires: Khalid Mahmood (Pak) and Asif Yaqoob (Pak)
Player of the match: Sana Mir (Pak)

- New Zealand Women won the toss and elected to bat.
- This was the Pakistan Women's first win against New Zealand Women in WODIs.
- Points: Pakistan Women 2, New Zealand Women 0.

== WT20I series ==
=== 1st WT20I ===
8 November 2017
10:00
Scorecard

New Zealand; 147/8 (20 overs)	v	Pakistan; 132/7 (20 overs)
Katey Martin 46 (27); Sadia Yousuf 3/30 (4 overs)		Nahida Khan 34 (25); Thamsyn Newton 2/22 (3 overs)

New Zealand Women won by 15 runs
Sharjah Cricket Stadium, Sharjah
Umpires: Khalid Mahmood (Pak) and Ahmed Shahab (Pak)
Player of the match: Katey Martin (NZ)

- Pakistan Women won the toss and elected to field.

=== 2nd WT20I ===
9 November 2017
10:00
Scorecard

New Zealand; 150/8 (20 overs)	v	Pakistan; 111/7 (20 overs)
Sophie Devine 70 (44); Javeria Khan 2/23 (4 overs)		Aliya Riaz 23 (22); Amy Satterthwaite 2/18 (3 overs)

New Zealand Women won by 39 runs
Sharjah Cricket Stadium, Sharjah
Umpires: Khalid Mahmood (Pak) and Ahmed Shahab (Pak)
Player of the match: Sophie Devine (NZ)

- New Zealand Women won the toss and elected to bat.
- Natalia Pervaiz and Nashra Sandhu (Pak) both made their WT20I debuts.

=== 3rd WT20I ===
12 November 2017
10:00
Scorecard

New Zealand; 126/4 (20 overs)	v	Pakistan; 84 (19 overs)
Suzie Bates 65 (57); Natalia Pervaiz 2/12 (3 overs)		Nahida Khan 23 (18); Hannah Rowe 3/18 (4 overs)

New Zealand Women won by 42 runs
Sharjah Cricket Stadium, Sharjah
Umpires: Rashid Riaz (Pak) and Ahmed Shahab (Pak)
Player of the match: Suzie Bates (NZ)

- New Zealand Women won the toss and elected to bat.

=== 4th WT20I ===
14 November 2017
10:00
Scorecard

Pakistan; 89/8 (20 overs)	v	New Zealand; 93/3 (11 overs)
Javeria Khan 36 (38); Hannah Rowe 3/22 (4 overs)		Sophie Devine 41 (17); Aiman Anwer 2/19 (2 overs)

New Zealand Women won by 7 wickets
Sharjah Cricket Stadium, Sharjah
Umpires: Ahmed Shahab (Pak) and Khalid Mahmood (Pak)
Player of the match: Sophie Devine (NZ)

- Pakistan Women won the toss and elected to bat.
