= West Indies women's cricket team in New Zealand in 2017–18 =

International cricket tour

	New Zealand women	West Indies women
- Dates: 1 – 25 March 2018
Captains	Suzie Bates	Stafanie Taylor

One Day International series
- Results: New Zealand women won the 3-match series 3–0
Most runs	Sophie Devine (261)	Stafanie Taylor (202)
Most wickets	Leigh Kasperek (7)	Afy Fletcher (5)

Twenty20 International series
- Results: New Zealand women won the 5-match series 4–0
Most runs	Katey Martin (180)	Hayley Matthews (112)
Most wickets	Leigh Kasperek (10)	Afy Fletcher (5); Shamilia Connell (5)

The West Indies women's cricket team played the New Zealand women's cricket team in March 2018. The tour consisted of three Women's One Day Internationals (WODIs) and five Women's Twenty20 Internationals (WT20Is). The WODI games were part of the 2017–20 ICC Women's Championship. New Zealand umpire Kathy Cross announced that she would retire from international umpiring at the end of the WT20I series.

New Zealand Women won the WODI series 3–0 and the WT20I series 4–0, after the fourth WT20I match was washed out.

== Squads ==
WODIs		WT20Is	
New Zealand	West Indies	New Zealand	West Indies
Suzie Bates (c); Sophie Devine; Lauren Down; Kate Ebrahim; Maddy Green; Holly Huddleston; Leigh Kasperek; Amelia Kerr; Katey Martin; Anna Peterson; Hannah Rowe; Amy Satterthwaite; Lea Tahuhu	Stafanie Taylor (c); Anisa Mohammed (vc); Merissa Aguilleira; Britney Cooper; Reniece Boyce; Shamilia Connell; Deandra Dottin; Afy Fletcher; Kycia Knight; Kyshona Knight; Hayley Matthews; Chedean Nation; Akeira Peters; Tremayne Smartt	Suzie Bates (c); Sophie Devine; Natalie Dodd; Maddy Green; Kate Heffernan; Hayley Jensen; Leigh Kasperek; Amelia Kerr; Katey Martin; Anna Peterson; Hannah Rowe; Amy Satterthwaite; Lea Tahuhu	Stafanie Taylor (c); Anisa Mohammed (vc); Merissa Aguilleira; Britney Cooper; Reniece Boyce; Shamilia Connell; Deandra Dottin; Afy Fletcher; Kycia Knight; Kyshona Knight; Hayley Matthews; Chedean Nation; Akeira Peters; Tremayne Smartt

== Tour match ==
=== 50-over match: Canterbury Women vs West Indies Women ===
1 March 2018
11:00
Scorecard

Canterbury Women; 216/5 (50 overs)	v	West Indies; 220/3 (34 overs)
Evelyn Jones 98 (142); Afy Fletcher 3/44 (10 overs)		Kycia Knight 70* (90); Gabby Sullivan 2/26 (7 overs)

West Indies Women won by 7 wickets
Bert Sutcliffe Oval, Lincoln
Umpires: Diana Venter (NZ) and Kathy Cross (NZ)

- West Indies Women won the toss and elected to field.
- 12 players per side (11 batting, 11 fielding).

== WODI series ==
=== 1st WODI ===
ICC Women's Championship
4 March 2018
11:00
Scorecard

New Zealand; 278/9 (50 overs)	v	West Indies; 277/9 (50 overs)
Sophie Devine 108 (103); Stafanie Taylor 3/54 (10 overs)		Stafanie Taylor 90 (93); Holly Huddleston 2/40 (9 overs)

New Zealand women won by 1 run
Bert Sutcliffe Oval, Lincoln
Umpires: Ashley Mehrotra (NZ) and Derek Walker (NZ)
Player of the match: Sophie Devine (NZ)

- West Indies Women won the toss and elected to field.
- Lauren Down (NZ) made her WODI debut.
- Sophie Devine (NZ) scored her third century in WODIs.
- Points: New Zealand Women 2, West Indies Women 0.

=== 2nd WODI ===
ICC Women's Championship
8 March 2018
11:00
Scorecard

West Indies; 194 (48.1 overs)	v	New Zealand; 195/2 (30.4 overs)
Stafanie Taylor 86 (112); Leigh Kasperek 4/44 (10 overs)		Suzie Bates 101* (86); Afy Fletcher 2/47 (8.4 overs)

New Zealand women won by 8 wickets
Bert Sutcliffe Oval, Lincoln
Umpires: Ashley Mehrotra (NZ) and Derek Walker (NZ)
Player of the match: Suzie Bates (NZ)

- New Zealand Women won the toss and elected to field.
- Suzie Bates (NZ) scored her ninth century in WODIs.
- Sophie Devine (NZ) scored her 2,000th run in WODIs.
- Points: New Zealand Women 2, West Indies Women 0.

=== 3rd WODI ===
ICC Women's Championship
11 March 2018
11:00
Scorecard

New Zealand; 310/5 (50 overs)	v	West Indies; 105 (34.5 overs)
Suzie Bates 89 (97); Deandra Dottin 2/58 (10 overs)		Stafanie Taylor 26 (26); Sophie Devine 3/24 (5.5 overs)

New Zealand Women won by 205 runs
Hagley Oval, Christchurch
Umpires: Ashley Mehrotra (NZ) and Derek Walker (NZ)
Player of the match: Sophie Devine (NZ)

- West Indies Women won the toss and elected to field.
- Suzie Bates (NZ) scored her 4,000th run in WODIs.
- Points: New Zealand Women 2, West Indies Women 0.

== WT20I series ==
=== 1st WT20I ===
14 March 2018
14:00
Scorecard

New Zealand; 167/6 (20 overs)	v	West Indies; 159/6 (20 overs)
Katey Martin 54 (35); Deandra Dottin 2/23 (4 overs)		Hayley Matthews 53 (31); Leigh Kasperek 3/35 (4 overs)

New Zealand Women won by 8 runs
Bay Oval, Mount Maunganui
Umpires: Billy Bowden (NZ) and Kathy Cross (NZ)
Player of the match: Katey Martin (NZ)

- West Indies Women won the toss and elected to field.
- Reniece Boyce (WI) made her WT20I debut.

=== 2nd WT20I ===
16 March 2018
19:00 (D/N)
Scorecard

New Zealand; 185/3 (20 overs)	v	West Indies; 79/8 (20 overs)
Katey Martin 65 (42); Akeira Peters 1/13 (2 overs)		Kyshona Knight 20 (35); Sophie Devine 3/12 (3 overs)

New Zealand won by 106 runs
Bay Oval, Mount Maunganui
Umpires: Billy Bowden and Kathy Cross (NZ)
Player of the match: Amy Satterthwaite (NZ)

- West Indies Women won the toss and elected to field.
- Kate Heffernan (NZ) made her WT20I debut.
- Kathy Cross (NZ) stood in her final match as an umpire before retiring.
- Amy Satterthwaite and Katey Martin (NZ) set a new record partnership for the third wicket for New Zealand Women and equalled the highest third-wicket stand for any team in WT20Is (124).
- In terms of runs, this was the West Indies Women's biggest defeat and New Zealand Women's highest winning margin in WT20Is.

=== 3rd WT20I ===
20 March 2018
14:00
Scorecard

New Zealand; 134/7 (20 overs)	v	West Indies; 133/7 (20 overs)
Suzie Bates 52* (53); Hayley Matthews 3/24 (4 overs)		Merissa Aguilleira 38* (41); Leigh Kasperek 3/31 (4 overs)

New Zealand Women won by 1 run
Pukekura Park, New Plymouth
Umpires: Billy Bowden (NZ) and Kim Cotton (NZ)

- West Indies Women won the toss and elected to field.

=== 4th WT20I ===
22 March 2018
14:00
Scorecard

New Zealand	v	West Indies

Match abandoned
Pukekura Park, New Plymouth
Umpires: Billy Bowden (NZ) and Diana Venter (NZ)

- No toss.

=== 5th WT20I ===
25 March 2018
14:00
Scorecard

West Indies; 139/5 (20 overs)	v	New Zealand; 143/3 (16.2 overs)
Stafanie Taylor 42 (36); Leigh Kasperek 2/19 (4 overs)		Katey Martin 54* (41); Shamilia Connell 3/35 (4 overs)

New Zealand Women won by 7 wickets
Seddon Park, Hamilton
Umpires: Kim Cotton (NZ) and Derek Walker (NZ)

- New Zealand Women won the toss and elected to field.
