= South Africa women's cricket team in New Zealand in 2019–20 =

International cricket tour

	New Zealand women	South Africa women
- Dates: 25 January – 13 February 2020
Captains	Sophie Devine	Dane van Niekerk (Note: Chloe Tryon captained South Africa Women in the first WT20I.)

One Day International series
- Results: South Africa women won the 3-match series 3–0
Most runs	Suzie Bates (142)	Lizelle Lee (157)
Most wickets	Jess Kerr (2); Sophie Devine (2)	Suné Luus (6)
- Player of the series: Lizelle Lee (SA)

Twenty20 International series
- Results: New Zealand women won the 5-match series 3–1
Most runs	Sophie Devine (297)	Mignon du Preez (97)
Most wickets	Amelia Kerr (5)	Ayabonga Khaka (4)

The South Africa women's cricket team played the New Zealand women's cricket team in January and February 2020. The tour consisted of three Women's One Day Internationals (WODIs), which formed part of the 2017–20 ICC Women's Championship, and five Women's Twenty20 International (WT20I) matches.

South Africa won the first two WODI matches to take an unassailable lead in the series. South Africa won the third and final WODI match by six wickets, to take the series 3–0. It was the first time that South Africa had whitewashed New Zealand in a WODI series. As a result of the 3–0 series win, South Africa qualified for the 2021 Women's Cricket World Cup. After their victory in the fourth WT20I match, New Zealand had a 3–1 lead, winning the series. New Zealand won the WT20I series 3–1, after the fifth match was abandoned due to rain.

== Squads ==
WODIs		WT20Is	
New Zealand	South Africa	New Zealand	South Africa
Sophie Devine (c); Suzie Bates; Bernadine Bezuidenhout; Lauren Down; Maddy Green; Holly Huddleston; Hayley Jensen; Leigh Kasperek; Amelia Kerr; Jess Kerr; Rosemary Mair; Katey Martin; Katie Perkins; Anna Peterson; Rachel Priest	Dane van Niekerk (c); Chloe Tryon (vc); Trisha Chetty; Shabnim Ismail; Marizanne Kapp; Ayabonga Khaka; Masabata Klaas; Nadine de Klerk; Lizelle Lee; Suné Luus; Nonkululeko Mlaba; Mignon du Preez; Tumi Sekhukhune; Nondumiso Shangase; Laura Wolvaardt	Sophie Devine (c); Suzie Bates; Lauren Down; Maddy Green; Holly Huddleston; Hayley Jensen; Leigh Kasperek; Amelia Kerr; Jess Kerr; Rosemary Mair; Katey Martin; Katie Perkins; Anna Peterson; Rachel Priest; Lea Tahuhu	Dane van Niekerk (c); Chloe Tryon (vc); Trisha Chetty; Shabnim Ismail; Marizanne Kapp; Ayabonga Khaka; Masabata Klaas; Nadine de Klerk; Lizelle Lee; Suné Luus; Nonkululeko Mlaba; Mignon du Preez; Tumi Sekhukhune; Nondumiso Shangase; Laura Wolvaardt

== WODI series ==
=== 1st WODI ===
ICC Women's Championship
25 January 2020
12:00
Scorecard

New Zealand; 259/9 (50 overs)	v	South Africa; 260/3 (48.3 overs)
Katie Perkins 78 (83; Masabata Klaas 3/37 (8 overs)		Lizelle Lee 99 (99); Suzie Bates 1/24 (3.3 overs)

South Africa Women won by 7 wickets
Eden Park Outer Oval, Auckland
Umpires: Billy Bowden (NZ) and Kim Cotton (NZ)
Player of the match: Lizelle Lee (SA)

- South Africa Women won the toss and elected to field.
- This was South Africa Women's second-highest successful run chase in WODIs.
- Points: South Africa Women 2, New Zealand Women 0.

=== 2nd WODI ===
ICC Women's Championship
27 January 2020
12:00
Scorecard

New Zealand; 115 (36 overs)	v	South Africa; 117/2 (23.5 overs)
Suzie Bates 38 (60); Marizanne Kapp 4/29 (8 overs)		Lizelle Lee 38 (43); Sophie Devine 1/16 (5.5 overs)

South Africa Women won by 8 wickets
Eden Park Outer Oval, Auckland
Umpires: Billy Bowden (NZ) and Ashley Mehrotra (NZ)
Player of the match: Marizanne Kapp (SA)

- New Zealand Women won the toss and elected to bat.
- Jess Kerr (NZ) made her WODI debut.
- Points: South Africa Women 2, New Zealand Women 0.

=== 3rd WODI ===
ICC Women's Championship
30 January 2020
14:00 (D/N)
Scorecard

New Zealand; 149 (38.1 overs)	v	South Africa; 150/4 (37.2 overs)
Suzie Bates 51 (58); Suné Luus 6/45 (10 overs)		Mignon du Preez 35* (47); Jess Kerr 1/17 (3 overs)

South Africa Women by 6 wickets
Seddon Park, Hamilton
Umpires: Kim Cotton (NZ) and John Dempsey (NZ)
Player of the match: Suné Luus (SA)

- South Africa Women won the toss and elected to field.
- Suné Luus (SA) became the first bowler to take two six-wicket hauls in WODIs.
- Points: South Africa Women 2, New Zealand Women 0.

== WT20I series ==
=== 1st WT20I ===
2 February 2020
16:00 (D/N)
Scorecard

South Africa; 116/7 (20 overs)	v	New Zealand; 117/1 (12.2 overs)
Laura Wolvaardt 33 (35); Leigh Kasperek 2/17 (4 overs); Amelia Kerr 2/17 (4 overs)		Sophie Devine 54* (32); Tumi Sekhukhune 1/12 (1 overs)

New Zealand Women won by 9 wickets
Bay Oval, Mount Maunganui
Umpires: Kim Cotton (NZ) and John Dempsey (NZ)

- New Zealand Women won the toss and elected to field.
- Sophie Devine (NZ) scored her 2,000th run in WT20Is.

=== 2nd WT20I ===
6 February 2020
14:00
Scorecard

South Africa; 119 (19.4 overs)	v	New Zealand; 120/5 (18.2 overs)
Mignon du Preez 40 (26); Lea Tahuhu 2/10 (4 overs)		Sophie Devine 61 (43); Ayabonga Khaka 2/24 (4 overs)

New Zealand Women won by 5 wickets
Seddon Park, Hamilton
Umpires: Chris Brown (NZ) and Kim Cotton (NZ)

- New Zealand Women won the toss and elected to field.

=== 3rd WT20I ===
9 February 2020
14:00
Scorecard

New Zealand; 153/5 (20 overs)	v	South Africa; 154/5 (19.5 overs)
Sophie Devine 77 (57); Ayabonga Khaka 2/14 (3 overs)		Dane van Niekerk 42 (40); Holly Huddleston 2/33 (4 overs)

South Africa Women won by 5 wickets
Basin Reserve, Wellington
Umpires: Kim Cotton (NZ) and Billy Bowden (NZ)

- New Zealand won the toss and elected to bat.
- Lauren Down and Jess Kerr (NZ) both made their WT20I debuts.

=== 4th WT20I ===
10 February 2020
14:00
Scorecard

New Zealand; 171/2 (20 overs)	v	South Africa; 102 (17 overs)
Sophie Devine 105 (65); Shabnim Ismail 1/21 (4 overs)		Lizelle Lee 25 (22); Anna Peterson 3/14 (4 overs)

New Zealand Women won by 69 runs
Basin Reserve, Wellington
Umpires: Billy Bowden (NZ) and Garth Stirrat (NZ)

- South Africa Women won the toss and elected to field.
- Sophie Devine (NZ) scored her first century in WT20Is.
- Sophie Devine (NZ) became the first cricketer (male or female) to make five consecutive scores of fifty or more in T20Is.

=== 5th WT20I ===
13 February 2020
14:00
Scorecard

New Zealand	v	South Africa

Match abandoned
University Oval, Dunedin
Umpires: John Bromley (NZ) and Derek Walker (NZ)

- No toss.
- No play was possible due to rain.
