= India women's cricket team in New Zealand in 2021–22 =

International cricket tour

	New Zealand women	India women
- Dates: 9 – 24 February 2022
Captains	Sophie Devine (Note: Amy Satterthwaite captained New Zealand Women for the second WODI.)	Mithali Raj (WODIs); Harmanpreet Kaur (WT20Is)

One Day International series
- Results: New Zealand women won the 5-match series 4–1
Most runs	Amelia Kerr (353)	Mithali Raj (232)
Most wickets	Jess Kerr (7); Amelia Kerr (7)	Deepti Sharma (10)
- Player of the series: Amelia Kerr (NZ)

Twenty20 International series
- Results: New Zealand women won the 1-match series 1–0
Most runs	Suzie Bates (36)	Sabbhineni Meghana (37)
Most wickets	Jess Kerr (2); Hayley Jensen (2); Amelia Kerr (2)	Pooja Vastrakar (2); Deepti Sharma (2)

The India women's cricket team toured New Zealand in February 2022. The tour consisted of five Women's One Day Internationals (WODIs) and one Women's Twenty20 International (WT20I). The WODI matches were used as preparation for the 2022 Women's Cricket World Cup, also taking place in New Zealand.

The initial tour schedule had matches in North New Zealand. However, on 27 January 2022, New Zealand Cricket announced a change to the itinerary, with all the matches being held at the John Davies Oval.

New Zealand won the one-off WT20I match by 18 runs following an all-round performance from Lea Tahuhu. New Zealand won the first WODI match by 62 runs after Suzie Bates scored a century. As part of New Zealand's "contingency planning" for the Women's Cricket World Cup, Amy Satterthwaite captained the team for the second WODI match. New Zealand went on to win the match by three wickets, with Amelia Kerr scoring an unbeaten 119 runs. New Zealand won the third match by three wickets, winning the series with two matches to play. It was India's tenth consecutive loss in WODIs after batting first.

The fourth WODI match was reduced to 20 overs per side due to rain. New Zealand won the match by 63 runs, following another all-round performance from Amelia Kerr. India won the fifth and final WODI match by six wickets, with New Zealand winning the series 4–1.

== Squads ==
WODIs		WT20Is	
New Zealand	India	New Zealand	India
Sophie Devine (c); Amy Satterthwaite (vc); Suzie Bates; Lauren Down; Maddy Green; Brooke Halliday; Hayley Jensen; Fran Jonas; Jess Kerr; Amelia Kerr; Frances Mackay; Rosemary Mair; Katey Martin; Hannah Rowe; Lea Tahuhu	Mithali Raj (c); Harmanpreet Kaur (vc); Simran Bahadur; Taniya Bhatia (wk); Yastika Bhatia; Ekta Bisht; Rajeshwari Gayakwad; Richa Ghosh (wk); Jhulan Goswami; Smriti Mandhana; Sabbhineni Meghana; Sneh Rana; Deepti Sharma; Meghna Singh; Renuka Singh; Pooja Vastrakar; Shafali Verma; Poonam Yadav	Sophie Devine (c); Amy Satterthwaite (vc); Suzie Bates; Lauren Down; Maddy Green; Brooke Halliday; Hayley Jensen; Fran Jonas; Jess Kerr; Amelia Kerr; Frances Mackay; Rosemary Mair; Katey Martin; Hannah Rowe; Lea Tahuhu	Harmanpreet Kaur (c); Smriti Mandhana (vc); Simran Bahadur; Taniya Bhatia (wk); Yastika Bhatia; Ekta Bisht; Rajeshwari Gayakwad; Richa Ghosh (wk); Jhulan Goswami; Sabbhineni Meghana; Sneh Rana; Deepti Sharma; Meghna Singh; Renuka Singh; Pooja Vastrakar; Shafali Verma; Poonam Yadav

India's Smriti Mandhana, Meghna Singh and Renuka Singh missed the WT20I match and the opening WODI fixture due to being in managed isolation and quarantine (MIQ) in New Zealand. As a result, Sabbhineni Meghana was added to India's WODI squad, after previously only being named in their WT20I squad. Simran Bahadur was also added to India's WODI squad, making her debut in the second match. Following the conclusion of the second WODI, Smriti Mandhana, Meghna Singh and Renuka Singh were all out of quarantine and available to play in the remaining matches. Ekta Bisht was added to India's squad for the third WODI. Brooke Halliday was ruled out of New Zealand's squad for the last two WODI matches, after being deemed a close contact to someone with COVID-19.

== Only WT20I ==
9 February 2022
13:00
Scorecard

New Zealand; 155/5 (20 overs)	v	India; 137/8 (20 overs)
Suzie Bates 36 (34); Pooja Vastrakar 2/16 (4 overs)		Sabbhineni Meghana 37 (30); Jess Kerr 2/20 (4 overs)

New Zealand Women won by 18 runs
John Davies Oval, Queenstown
Umpires: Kim Cotton (NZ) and John Dempsey (NZ)
Player of the match: Lea Tahuhu (NZ)

- India Women won the toss and elected to field.

== WODI series ==
=== 1st WODI ===
12 February 2022
11:00
Scorecard

New Zealand; 275 (48.1 overs)	v	India; 213 (49.4 overs)
Suzie Bates 106 (111); Rajeshwari Gayakwad 2/28 (7.1 overs)		Mithali Raj 59 (73); Jess Kerr 4/35 (9.4 overs)

New Zealand women won by 62 runs
John Davies Oval, Queenstown
Umpires: John Bromley (NZ) and Derek Walker (NZ)
Player of the match: Suzie Bates (NZ)

- India Women won the toss and elected to field.
- Sabbhineni Meghana (Ind) made her WODI debut.

=== 2nd WODI ===
15 February 2022
11:00
Scorecard

India; 270/6 (50 overs)	v	New Zealand; 273/7 (49 overs)
Mithali Raj 66* (81); Sophie Devine 2/42 (8 overs)		Amelia Kerr 119* (135); Deepti Sharma 4/52 (10 overs)

New Zealand Women won by 3 wickets
John Davies Oval, Queenstown
Umpires: John Dempsey (NZ) and Derek Walker (NZ)
Player of the match: Amelia Kerr (NZ)

- India Women won the toss and elected to bat.
- Simran Bahadur (Ind) made her WODI debut.

=== 3rd WODI ===
18 February 2022
11:00
Scorecard

India; 279 (49.3 overs)	v	New Zealand; 280/7 (49.1 overs)
Deepti Sharma 69* (69); Rosemary Mair 2/43 (10 overs)		Lauren Down 64* (52); Jhulan Goswami 3/47 (10 overs)

New Zealand Women won by 3 wickets
John Davies Oval, Queenstown
Umpires: Cory Black (NZ) and John Dempsey (NZ)
Player of the match: Lauren Down (NZ)

- New Zealand Women won the toss and elected to field.
- Renuka Singh (Ind) made her WODI debut.
- This was New Zealand Women's highest successful run chase in WODIs, and the second-highest successful run chase overall.

=== 4th WODI ===
22 February 2022
11:00
Scorecard

New Zealand; 191/5 (20 overs)	v	India; 128 (17.5 overs)
Amelia Kerr 68* (33); Renuka Singh 2/33 (4 overs)		Richa Ghosh 52 (29); Amelia Kerr 3/30 (3.5 overs)

New Zealand women won by 63 runs
John Davies Oval, Queenstown
Umpires: John Bromley (NZ) and Derek Walker (NZ)
Player of the match: Amelia Kerr (NZ)

- India Women won the toss and elected to field.
- The match was reduced to 20 overs per side due to rain.

=== 5th WODI ===
24 February 2022
11:00
Scorecard

New Zealand; 251/9 (50 overs)	v	India; 255/4 (46 overs)
Amelia Kerr 66 (75); Sneh Rana 2/40 (10 overs)		Smriti Mandhana 71 (84); Hayley Jensen 1/29 (4 overs)

India women won by 6 wickets
John Davies Oval, Queenstown
Umpires: John Dempsey (NZ) and Derek Walker (NZ)
Player of the match: Smriti Mandhana (Ind)

- New Zealand Women won the toss and elected to bat.
