= Sri Lanka women's cricket team in Australia in 2019–20 =

International cricket tour

	Australia women	Sri Lanka
- Dates: 27 September – 9 October 2019
Captains	Meg Lanning	Shashikala Siriwardene (WODIs); Chamari Athapaththu (WT20Is)

One Day International series
- Results: Australia women won the 3-match series 3–0
Most runs	Rachael Haynes (237)	Chamari Athapaththu (130)
Most wickets	Jess Jonassen (6)	Shashikala Siriwardene (3); Achini Kulasuriya (3)

Twenty20 International series
- Results: Australia women won the 3-match series 3–0
Most runs	Alyssa Healy (212)	Chamari Athapaththu (159)
Most wickets	Tayla Vlaeminck (4); Georgia Wareham (4)	Chamari Athapaththu (3)

The Sri Lanka women's cricket team played the Australia women's cricket team in September and October 2019. The tour consisted of three Women's One Day Internationals (WODIs), which formed part of the 2017–20 ICC Women's Championship, and three Women's Twenty20 International (WT20I) matches. It was the first bilateral series played by Sri Lanka Women in Australia.

In the third and final WT20I match of the series, Australia's Alyssa Healy set a new record for the highest individual score in a Women's T20I match, with 148 not out. Australia won the WT20I series 3–0. Australia won the first two WODI matches to take an unassailable lead in the series. Their win in the second match was their 17th consecutive win in WODIs, which equalled the record for most consecutive wins in the format. The victory also confirmed Australia as the winners of the 2017–20 ICC Women's Championship. Australia went on to win the third WODI by nine wickets, winning the series 3–0, and setting a new record for the most consecutive wins in WODIs, with 18.

== Squads ==
WODIs		WT20Is	
Australia	Sri Lanka	Australia	Sri Lanka
Meg Lanning (c); Rachael Haynes (vc); Nicola Carey; Ashleigh Gardner; Heather Graham; Alyssa Healy (wk); Jess Jonassen; Delissa Kimmince; Beth Mooney; Ellyse Perry; Megan Schutt; Tayla Vlaeminck; Georgia Wareham	Shashikala Siriwardene (c); Chamari Athapaththu; Nilakshi de Silva; Ama Kanchana; Hansima Karunaratne; Achini Kulasuriya; Sugandika Kumari; Dilani Manodara; Yashoda Mendis; Inoshi Priyadharshani; Udeshika Prabodhani; Oshadi Ranasinghe; Inoka Ranaweera; Harshitha Samarawickrama; Anushka Sanjeewani	Meg Lanning (c); Rachael Haynes (vc); Erin Burns; Nicola Carey; Ashleigh Gardner; Heather Graham; Alyssa Healy (wk); Jess Jonassen; Delissa Kimmince; Beth Mooney; Ellyse Perry; Megan Schutt; Tayla Vlaeminck; Georgia Wareham	Chamari Athapaththu (c); Nilakshi de Silva; Ama Kanchana; Hansima Karunaratne; Achini Kulasuriya; Sugandika Kumari; Dilani Manodara; Yashoda Mendis; Inoshi Priyadharshani; Udeshika Prabodhani; Oshadi Ranasinghe; Inoka Ranaweera; Harshitha Samarawickrama; Anushka Sanjeewani; Shashikala Siriwardene

== Tour match ==
=== 20-over match: Cricket Australia XI vs Sri Lanka ===
27 September 2019
14:00
Scorecard

Sri Lanka; 8/133 (20 overs)	v	Cricket Australia XI; 5/133 (20 overs)
Harshitha Samarawickrama 34 (30); Heather Graham 3/17 (4 overs)		Annabel Sutherland 48* (38); Shashikala Siriwardene 2/25 (4 overs)

Match tied
(Sri Lanka Women won the Super Over)
Hurstville Oval, Hurstville
Umpires: Phillip Gillespie (Aus) and Claire Polosak (Aus)

- Sri Lanka Women won the toss and elected to bat.

== WT20I series ==
=== 1st WT20I ===
29 September 2019
14:40
Scorecard

Australia; 4/217 (20 overs)	v	Sri Lanka; 7/176 (20 overs)
Beth Mooney 113 (61); Oshadi Ranasinghe 2/44 (4 overs)		Chamari Athapaththu 113 (66); Georgia Wareham 2/19 (2 overs)

Australia Women won by 41 runs
North Sydney Oval, Sydney
Umpires: Shawn Craig (Aus) and Phillip Gillespie (Aus)
Player of the match: Beth Mooney (Aus)

- Australia Women won the toss and elected to bat.
- This was Australia Women's highest total at home in WT20Is.
- Beth Mooney (Aus) became the fourth cricketer to score two centuries in WT20Is.
- This was Sri Lanka Women's highest total in WT20Is.
- Chamari Athapaththu (SL) scored her first century in WT20Is.

=== 2nd WT20I ===
30 September 2019
19:10 (N)
Scorecard

Sri Lanka; 8/84 (20 overs)	v	Australia; 1/87 (9.4 overs)
Shashikala Siriwardene 19 (25); Ellyse Perry 2/21 (4 overs)		Erin Burns 30* (18); Udeshika Prabodhani 1/12 (3 overs)

Australia Women won by 9 wickets
North Sydney Oval, Sydney
Umpires: Shawn Craig (Aus) and Claire Polosak (Aus)
Player of the match: Beth Mooney (Aus)

- Sri Lanka Women won the toss and elected to bat.
- Alyssa Healy (Aus) played in her 100th WT20I.

=== 3rd WT20I ===
2 October 2019
14:10
Scorecard

Australia; 2/226 (20 overs)	v	Sri Lanka; 7/94 (20 overs)
Alyssa Healy 148* (61); Chamari Athapaththu 2/27 (4 overs)		Chamari Athapaththu 30 (39); Nicola Carey 3/15 (4 overs)

Australia Women won by 132 runs
North Sydney Oval, Sydney
Umpires: Phillip Gillespie (Aus) and Claire Polosak (Aus)
Player of the match: Alyssa Healy (Aus)

- Australia Women won the toss and elected to bat.
- Alyssa Healy (Aus) scored her first century, and the highest individual score in WT20Is.

== WODI series ==
=== 1st WODI ===
ICC Women's Championship
5 October 2019
10:10
Scorecard

Australia; 8/281 (50 overs)	v	Sri Lanka; 124 (41.3 overs)
Meg Lanning 73 (66); Udeshika Prabodhani 2/46 (9 overs)		Shashikala Siriwardene 30 (51); Ashleigh Gardner 2/9 (9 overs)

Australia Women won by 157 runs
Allan Border Field, Brisbane
Umpires: Shawn Craig (Aus) and Phillip Gillespie (Aus)
Player of the match: Meg Lanning (Aus)

- Australia Women won the toss and elected to bat.
- Points: Australia Women 2, Sri Lanka Women 0.

=== 2nd WODI ===
ICC Women's Championship
7 October 2019
10:10
Scorecard

Australia; 8/282 (50 overs)	v	Sri Lanka; 9/172 (50 overs)
Rachael Haynes 118 (132); Achini Kulasuriya 3/50 (10 overs)		Harshitha Samarawickrama 39 (61); Jess Jonassen 4/31 (10 overs)

Australia Women won by 110 runs
Allan Border Field, Brisbane
Umpires: Phillip Gillespie (Aus) and Claire Polosak (Aus)
Player of the match: Rachael Haynes (Aus)

- Australia Women won the toss and elected to bat.
- Heather Graham (Aus) made her WODI debut.
- Rachael Haynes (Aus) scored her first century in WODIs.
- Jess Jonassen (Aus) took her 100th wicket in WODIs.
- Points: Australia Women 2, Sri Lanka Women 0.

=== 3rd WODI ===
ICC Women's Championship
9 October 2019
10:10
Scorecard

Sri Lanka; 8/195 (50 overs)	v	Australia; 1/196 (26.5 overs)
Chamari Athapaththu 103 (124); Megan Schutt 2/44 (10 overs)		Alyssa Healy 112* (76); Chamari Athapaththu 1/32 (3.5 overs)

Australia Women won by 9 wickets
Allan Border Field, Brisbane
Umpires: Shawn Craig (Aus) and Claire Polosak (Aus)
Player of the match: Alyssa Healy (Aus)

- Sri Lanka Women won the toss and elected to bat.
- Points: Australia Women 2, Sri Lanka Women 0.
