= India women's cricket team in Sri Lanka in 2018–19 =

International cricket tour

	Sri Lanka women	India women
- Dates: 11 – 25 September 2018
Captains	Chamari Athapaththu	Mithali Raj (WODIs); Harmanpreet Kaur (WT20Is)

One Day International series
- Results: India women won the 3-match series 2–1
Most runs	Chamari Athapaththu (205)	Mithali Raj (177)
Most wickets	Chamari Athapaththu (4)	Mansi Joshi (7)

Twenty20 International series
- Results: India women won the 5-match series 4–0
Most runs	Chamari Athapaththu (107)	Jemimah Rodrigues (191)
Most wickets	Shashikala Siriwardene (5); Chamari Athapaththu (5)	Poonam Yadav (8)

The India women's cricket team played the Sri Lanka women's cricket team in September 2018. The tour consisted of three Women's One Day Internationals (WODIs), which formed part of the 2017–20 ICC Women's Championship, and five Women's Twenty20 International (WT20I) matches. The matches were played in Galle, Katunayake and Colombo. India Women won the WODI series 2–1, and the WT20I series 4–0, after the second match finished in a no result.

== Squads ==
WODIs		WT20Is	
Sri Lanka	India	Sri Lanka	India
Chamari Athapaththu (c); Kavisha Dilhari; Nipuni Hansika; Ama Kanchana; Sugandika Kumari; Dilani Manodara; Imalka Mendis; Hasini Perera; Udeshika Prabodhani; Inoka Ranaweera; Anushka Sanjeewani; Nilakshi de Silva; Shashikala Siriwardene; Prasadani Weerakkody; Sripali Weerakkody	Mithali Raj (c); Harmanpreet Kaur (vc); Taniya Bhatia (wk); Ekta Bisht; Rajeshwari Gayakwad; Jhulan Goswami; Dayalan Hemalatha; Mansi Joshi; Veda Krishnamurthy; Smriti Mandhana; Shikha Pandey; Punam Raut; Jemimah Rodrigues; Deepti Sharma; Poonam Yadav	Chamari Athapaththu (c); Kavisha Dilhari; Ama Kanchana; Eshani Kaushalya; Sugandika Kumari; Dilani Manodara; Imalka Mendis; Yashoda Mendis; Hasini Perera; Udeshika Prabodhani; Inoshi Priyadharshani; Oshadi Ranasinghe; Sharina Ravikumar; Anushka Sanjeewani; Nilakshi de Silva; Shashikala Siriwardene; Rebeca Vandort; Sripali Weerakkody	Harmanpreet Kaur (c); Smriti Mandhana (vc); Taniya Bhatia (wk); Ekta Bisht; Dayalan Hemalatha; Mansi Joshi; Veda Krishnamurthy; Shikha Pandey; Anuja Patil; Mithali Raj; Arundhati Reddy; Jemimah Rodrigues; Deepti Sharma; Poonam Yadav; Radha Yadav

== WODI series ==
=== 1st WODI ===
ICC Women's Championship
11 September 2018
10:00
Scorecard

Sri Lanka; 98 (35.1 overs)	v	India; 100/1 (19.5 overs)
Chamari Athapaththu 33 (93); Mansi Joshi 3/16 (6.1 overs)		Smriti Mandhana 73* (76); Inoka Ranaweera 1/5 (2 overs)

India Women won by 9 wickets
Galle International Stadium, Galle
Umpires: Deepal Gunawardene (SL) and Ranmore Martinesz (SL)

- Sri Lanka Women won the toss and elected to bat.
- Dayalan Hemalatha and Taniya Bhatia (Ind) both made their WODI debuts.
- Mithali Raj (Ind) made the most appearances as a captain in WODIs (118 matches).
- Jhulan Goswami (Ind) took her 300th wicket in international cricket.
- Poonam Yadav became the second-fastest bowler for India to take 50 wickets in WODIs.
- Points: India Women 2, Sri Lanka Women 0.

=== 2nd WODI ===
ICC Women's Championship
13 September 2018
10:00
Scorecard

India; 219 (50 overs)	v	Sri Lanka; 212 (48.1 overs)
Taniya Bhatia 68 (66); Chamari Athapaththu 3/42 (8 overs)		Chamari Athapaththu 57 (95); Rajeshwari Gayakwad 2/37 (9 overs)

India Women won by 7 runs
Galle International Stadium, Galle
Umpires: Prageeth Rambukwella (SL) and Raveendra Wimalasiri (SL)

- India Women won the toss and elected to bat.
- Points: India Women 2, Sri Lanka Women 0.

=== 3rd WODI ===
ICC Women's Championship
16 September 2018
10:00
Scorecard

India; 253/5 (50 overs)	v	Sri Lanka; 257/7 (49.5 overs)
Mithali Raj 125* (143); Udeshika Prabodhani 1/20 (4 overs)		Chamari Athapaththu 115 (133); Jhulan Goswami 2/39 (10 overs)

Sri Lanka Women won by 3 wickets
FTZ Sports Complex, Katunayake
Umpires: Hemantha Boteju (SL) and Lyndon Hannibal (SL)

- Sri Lanka Women won the toss and elected to field.
- This was Sri Lanka Women's highest successful run chase in WODIs.
- Points: Sri Lanka Women 2, India Women 0.

== WT20I series ==
=== 1st WT20I ===
19 September 2018
10.00
Scorecard

India; 168/8 (20 overs)	v	Sri Lanka; 155 (19.3 overs)
Taniya Bhatia 46 (35); Udeshika Prabodhani 2/18 (4 overs)		Eshani Kaushalya 45 (31); Poonam Yadav 4/26 (4 overs)

India Women won by 13 runs
FTZ Sports Complex, Katunayake
Umpires: Ranmore Martinesz (SL) and Pradeep Udawatta (SL)

- Sri Lanka Women won the toss and elected to field.
- Kavisha Dilhari (SL) and Arundhati Reddy (Ind) both made their WT20I debuts.

=== 2nd WT20I ===
21 September 2018
10.00
Scorecard

Sri Lanka; 49/3 (7.5 overs)	v	India
Chamari Athapaththu 21 (16); Poonam Yadav 1/2 (1 over)

No result
Colts Cricket Club Ground, Colombo
Umpires: Pradeep Udawatta (SL) and Raveendra Wimalasiri (SL)

- India Women won the toss and elected to field.
- Rain during Sri Lanka Women's innings prevented any further play.

=== 3rd WT20I ===
22 September 2018
10.00
Scorecard

Sri Lanka; 131/8 (20 overs)	v	India; 132/5 (18.2 overs)
Shashikala Siriwardene 35 (32); Harmanpreet Kaur 2/3 (1 over)		Jemimah Rodrigues 57 (40); Chamari Athapaththu 2/29 (4 overs)

India Women won by 5 wickets
Colombo Cricket Club Ground, Colombo
Umpires: Lyndon Hannibal (SL) and Prageeth Rambukwella (SL)

- India Women won the toss and elected to field.

=== 4th WT20I ===
24 September 2018
10.00
Scorecard

Sri Lanka; 134/5 (17 overs)	v	India; 137/3 (15.4 overs)
Shashikala Siriwardene 40 (32); Anuja Patil 3/36 (4 overs)		Anuja Patil 54* (42); Oshadi Ranasinghe 3/33 (3.4 overs)

India Women won by 7 wickets
Colombo Cricket Club Ground, Colombo
Umpires: Hemantha Boteju (SL) and Ranmore Martinesz (SL)

- India Women won the toss and elected to field.
- The match was reduced to 17 overs per side due to rain.

=== 5th WT20I ===
25 September 2018
10.00
Scorecard

India; 156 (18.3 overs)	v	Sri Lanka; 105 (17.4 overs)
Harmanpreet Kaur 63 (38); Shashikala Siriwardene 3/19 (3.3 overs)		Anushka Sanjeewani 29 (37); Poonam Yadav 3/18 (4 overs)

India Women won by 51 runs
FTZ Sports Complex, Katunayake
Umpires: Prageeth Rambukwella (SL) and Raveendra Wimalasiri (SL)

- Sri Lanka Women won the toss and elected to field.
