= Sri Lanka women's cricket team in the West Indies in 2017–18 =

International cricket tour

	West Indies women	Sri Lanka women
- Dates: 11 – 22 October 2017
Captains	Stafanie Taylor	Inoka Ranaweera

One Day International series
- Results: West Indies women won the 3-match series 3–0
Most runs	Stafanie Taylor (117)	Dilani Manodara (96)
Most wickets	Stafanie Taylor (8)	Inoka Ranaweera (5)

Twenty20 International series
- Results: West Indies women won the 3-match series 3–0
Most runs	Deandra Dottin (154)	Rebeca Vandort (73)
Most wickets	Hayley Matthews (7)	Inoka Ranaweera (4)
- Player of the series: Deandra Dottin (WI)

The Sri Lanka women's cricket team toured the West Indies to play the West Indies women's cricket team during October 2017. The tour consisted of three Women's One Day Internationals (WODIs) and three Women's Twenty20 Internationals (WT20Is). The WODI games were part of the 2017–20 ICC Women's Championship. West Indies won both the WODI and the WT20I series with an identical scoreline, 3–0.

== Squads ==
West Indies	Sri Lanka
Stafanie Taylor (c); Merissa Aguilleira; Reniece Boyce; Shamilia Connell; Britney Cooper; Deandra Dottin; Afy Fletcher; Kycia Knight; Kyshona Knight; Hayley Matthews; Anisa Mohammed; Chedean Nation; Akeira Peters; Shakera Selman	Inoka Ranaweera (c); Chamari Athapaththu; Chandima Gunaratne; Nipuni Hansika; Ama Kanchana; Hansima Karunaratne; Achini Kulasuriya; Dilani Manodara; Yashoda Mendis; Hasini Perera; Udeshika Prabodhani; Shashikala Siriwardene; Rebeca Vandort (wk); Prasadani Weerakkody; Sripali Weerakkody

== WODI series ==
=== 1st WODI ===
ICC Women's Championship
11 October 2017
09:00
Scorecard

Sri Lanka; 136 (49.4 overs)	v	West Indies; 138/4 (39 overs)
Yashoda Mendis 34 (72); Hayley Matthews 3/18 (10 overs)		Merissa Aguilleira 32* (48); Inoka Ranaweera 2/27 (10 overs)

West Indies Women won by 6 wickets
Brian Lara Cricket Academy, Trinidad
Umpires: Zahid Bassarath (WI) and Deighton Butler (WI)
Player of the match: Hayley Matthews (WI)

- Sri Lanka Women won the toss and elected to bat.
- Points: West Indies Women 2, Sri Lanka Women 0.

=== 2nd WODI ===
ICC Women's Championship
13 October 2017
14:00 (D/N)
Scorecard

Sri Lanka; 162 (46.3 overs)	v	West Indies; 163/3 (39.4 overs)
Yasoda Mendis 34 (31); Afy Fletcher 3/24 (10 overs)		Stafanie Taylor 60* (83); Chamari Athapaththu 1/27 (5 overs)

West Indies Women won by 7 wickets
Brian Lara Cricket Academy, Trinidad
Umpires: Zahid Bassarath (WI) and Deighton Butler (WI)
Player of the match: Stafanie Taylor (WI)

- West Indies Women won the toss and elected to field.
- The match was reduced to 47 overs per side due to rain.
- Points: West Indies Women 2, Sri Lanka Women 0.

=== 3rd WODI ===
ICC Women's Championship
15 October 2017
09:00
Scorecard

West Indies; 182/8 (45 overs)	v	Sri Lanka; 142 (40.4 overs)
Stafanie Taylor 55 (82); Shashikala Siriwardene 3/26 (9 overs)		Dilani Manodara 42 (89); Stafanie Taylor 3/29 (6.4 overs)

West Indies Women won by 40 runs
Brian Lara Cricket Academy, Trinidad
Umpires: Zahid Bassarath (WI) and Deighton Butler (WI)
Player of the match: Stafanie Taylor (WI)

- Sri Lanka Women won the toss and elected to field.
- The match was reduced to 45 overs per side due to rain.
- Points: West Indies Women 2, Sri Lanka Women 0.

== WT20I series ==
=== 1st WT20I ===
19 October 2017
18:30 (N)
Scorecard

West Indies; 140/4 (20 overs)	v	Sri Lanka; 69/7 (20 overs)
Hayley Matthews 37 (37); Inoka Ranaweera 2/35 (4 overs)		Ama Kanchana 17 (21); Shakera Selman 2/6 (3 overs)

West Indies Women won by 71 runs
Coolidge Cricket Ground, Antigua
Umpires: Carl Tuckett (WI) and Jacqueline Williams (WI)

- Sri Lanka Women won the toss and elected to field.
- Akeira Peters (WI) made her WT20I debut.

=== 2nd WT20I ===
21 October 2017
18:30 (N)
Scorecard

West Indies; 154/6 (20 overs)	v	Sri Lanka; 107 (19.4 overs)
Stafanie Taylor 49 (41); Inoka Ranaweera 2/47 (4 overs)		Chamari Athapaththu 30 (33); Afy Fletcher 5/12 (3.4 overs)

West Indies Women won by 47 runs
Coolidge Cricket Ground, Antigua
Umpires: Carl Tuckett (WI) and Jacqueline Williams (WI)
Player of the match: Afy Fletcher (WI)

- West Indies Women won the toss and elected to bat.
- Afy Fletcher took the joint second-best figures for the West Indies Women in a WT20I.

=== 3rd WT20I ===
22 October 2017
18:30 (N)
Scorecard

West Indies; 159/6 (20 overs)	v	Sri Lanka; 128/5 (20 overs)
Deandra Dottin 112 (67); Ama Kanchana 2/24 (2 overs)		Rebeca Vandort 50 (39); Hayley Matthews 4/18 (4 overs)

West Indies Women won by 31 runs
Coolidge Cricket Ground, Antigua
Umpires: Carl Tuckett (WI) and Jacqueline Williams (WI)
Player of the match: Deandra Dottin (WI)

- West Indies Women won the toss and elected to bat.
- Deandra Dottin (WI) became the first woman to score two centuries in WT20Is.
