= England women's cricket team in Sri Lanka in 2018–19 =

International cricket tour

	Sri Lanka women	England women
- Dates: 13 – 28 March 2019
Captains	Chamari Athapaththu	Heather Knight

One Day International series
- Results: England women won the 3-match series 3–0
Most runs	Oshadi Ranasinghe (90)	Amy Jones (209)
Most wickets	Inoshi Priyadharshani (3); Oshadi Ranasinghe (3)	Anya Shrubsole (5); Alex Hartley (5); Kate Cross (5)

Twenty20 International series
- Results: England women won the 3-match series 3–0
Most runs	Hansima Karunaratne (73)	Amy Jones (111)
Most wickets	Oshadi Ranasinghe (2); Shashikala Siriwardene (2)	Linsey Smith (4)

The England women's cricket team toured Sri Lanka to play the Sri Lanka women's national cricket team in March 2019. The tour consisted of three Women's One Day Internationals (WODIs), which formed part of the 2017–20 ICC Women's Championship, and three Women's Twenty20 International (WT20) matches.

England Women won the WODI series 3–0. The series defeat meant that Sri Lanka Women could no longer qualify directly for the 2021 Women's Cricket World Cup, progressing to the 2020 Women's Cricket World Cup Qualifier tournament instead. England Women also won the WT20I series 3–0.

== Squads ==
WODIs		WT20Is	
Sri Lanka	England	Sri Lanka	England
Chamari Athapaththu (c); Kavisha Dilhari; Hansima Karunaratne; Achini Kulasuriya; Sugandika Kumari; Hasini Perera; Udeshika Prabodhani; Inoshi Priyadharshani; Oshadi Ranasinghe; Inoka Ranaweera; Harshitha Samarawickrama; Anushka Sanjeewani; Nilakshi de Silva; Shashikala Siriwardene; Prasadani Weerakkody	Heather Knight (c); Tammy Beaumont; Katherine Brunt; Kate Cross; Freya Davies; Sophia Dunkley; ~~Sophie Ecclestone~~; Georgia Elwiss; Alex Hartley; Amy Jones (wk); Laura Marsh; Nat Sciver; Anya Shrubsole; Linsey Smith; Fran Wilson; Lauren Winfield; Danni Wyatt	Chamari Athapaththu (c); Hansima Karunaratne; Achini Kulasuriya; Sugandika Kumari; Dilani Manodara; Imalka Mendis; Madushika Methtananda; Hasini Perera; Inoshi Priyadharshani; Oshadi Ranasinghe; Inoka Ranaweera; Harshitha Samarawickrama; Anushka Sanjeewani; Nilakshi de Silva; Shashikala Siriwardene; Umesha Thimashini	Heather Knight (c); Tammy Beaumont; Katherine Brunt; Kate Cross; Freya Davies; Sophia Dunkley; ~~Sophie Ecclestone~~; Georgia Elwiss; Amy Jones (wk); Laura Marsh; Nat Sciver; Anya Shrubsole; Linsey Smith; Fran Wilson; Lauren Winfield; Danni Wyatt

Sophie Ecclestone was ruled out of England's squad, after suffering a broken hand during the WODI series against India in February 2019. Katherine Brunt was later added to England's squads.

== Tour match ==
=== 50-over match: Sri Lanka Women Emerging Team v England Women ===
13 March 2019
09:50
Scorecard

England; 319/7 (50 overs)	v	Sri Lanka Women Emerging Team; 166 (40 overs)
Lauren Winfield 80 (82); Madushika Methtananda 2/58 (9 overs)		Harshitha Samarawickrama 59 (82); Heather Knight 4/13 (3 overs)

England Women won by 153 runs
P Sara Oval, Colombo
Umpires: Hemantha Boteju (SL) and Asanga Jayasooriya (SL)

- England Women won the toss and elected to bat.

== WODI series ==
=== 1st WODI ===
ICC Women's Championship
16 March 2019
09:50
Scorecard

England; 331/7 (50 overs)	v	Sri Lanka; 159/8 (40 overs)
Nat Sciver 93 (73); Oshadi Ranasinghe 2/71 (10 overs)		Oshadi Ranasinghe 51* (72); Katherine Brunt 3/24 (7 overs)

England Women won by 154 runs (DLS method)
Mahinda Rajapaksa International Cricket Stadium, Sooriyawewa
Umpires: Deepal Gunawardene (SL) and Lyndon Hannibal (SL)

- Sri Lanka Women won the toss and elected to field.
- Sri Lanka Women were set a revised target of 314 runs from 40 overs due to rain.
- Points: England Women 2, Sri Lanka Women 0.

=== 2nd WODI ===
ICC Women's Championship
18 March 2019
09:50
Scorecard

Sri Lanka; 187/9 (50 overs)	v	England; 188/4 (33.3 overs)
Harshitha Samarawickrama 42 (46); Alex Hartley 3/36 (10 overs)		Amy Jones 54 (39); Inoshi Priyadharshani 3/45 (9 overs)

England Women won by 6 wickets
Mahinda Rajapaksa International Cricket Stadium, Sooriyawewa
Umpires: Lyndon Hannibal (SL) and Prageeth Rambukwella (SL)

- Sri Lanka Women won the toss and elected to bat.
- Points: England Women 2, Sri Lanka Women 0.

=== 3rd WODI ===
ICC Women's Championship
21 March 2019
09:50
Scorecard

Sri Lanka; 174 (50 overs)	v	England; 177/2 (26.1 overs)
Harshitha Samarawickrama 42 (72); Kate Cross 2/25 (10 overs)		Amy Jones 76 (58); Shashikala Siriwardene 2/56 (7.1 overs)

England Women won by 8 wickets
FTZ Sports Complex, Katunayake
Umpires: Prageeth Rambukwella (SL) and Pradeep Udawatta (SL)

- Sri Lanka Women won the toss and elected to bat.
- Points: England Women 2, Sri Lanka Women 0.

== WT20I series ==
=== 1st WT20I ===
24 March 2019
10:00
Scorecard

Sri Lanka; 94 (19 overs)	v	England; 95/2 (14.2 overs)
Oshadi Ranasinghe 20 (24); Linsey Smith 3/18 (4 overs)		Tammy Beaumont 50* (43); Chamari Athapaththu 1/14 (3 overs)

England Women won by 8 wickets
P. Sara Oval, Colombo
Umpires: Asanga Jayasooriya (SL) and Nilan De Silva (SL)

- Sri Lanka Women won the toss and elected to bat.
- Freya Davies (Eng) made her WT20I debut.
- Tammy Beaumont (Eng) scored her 1,000th run in WT20Is.

=== 2nd WT20I ===
26 March 2019
10:00
Scorecard

Sri Lanka; 108/6 (20 overs)	v	England; 109/2 (13.5 overs)
Chamari Athapaththu 24 (30); Katherine Brunt 2/31 (4 overs)		Danni Wyatt 37 (25); Shashikala Siriwardene 2/26 (4 overs)

England Women won by 8 wickets
P. Sara Oval, Colombo
Umpires: Hemantha Boteju (SL) and Raveendra Wimalasiri (SL)

- Sri Lanka Women won the toss and elected to bat.

=== 3rd WT20I ===
28 March 2019
10:00
Scorecard

England; 204/2 (20 overs)	v	Sri Lanka; 108/6 (20 overs)
Amy Jones 57 (38); Oshadi Ranasinghe 2/28 (4 overs)		Hansima Karunaratne 44* (53); Kate Cross 2/20 (4 overs)

England Women won by 96 runs
P. Sara Oval, Colombo
Umpires: Deepal Gunawardene (SL) and Raveendra Wimalasiri (SL)

- Sri Lanka Women won the toss and elected to field.
- Madushika Methtananda (SL) made her WT20I debut.
- Nat Sciver (Eng) scored her 1,000th run in WT20Is.
- England Women made the highest total in Sri Lanka in WT20Is.
