= Australia women's cricket team in India in 2017–18 =

	India women	Australian women
- Dates: 6 – 18 March 2018
Captains	Mithali Raj (Note: Harmanpreet Kaur captained India in their first WODI match.)	Meg Lanning

One Day International series
- Results: Australian women won the 3-match series 3–0
Most runs	Smriti Mandhana (131)	Nicole Bolton (195)
Most wickets	Shikha Pandey (5)	Jess Jonassen (8)

The Australia women's cricket team played the India women's cricket team in March 2018. The tour consisted of three Women's One Day Internationals (WODIs) which formed part of the 2017–20 ICC Women's Championship. Following the WODI matches, both teams played in a tri-series, with England women being the third team. Australia Women won the series 3–0 and became the number one ranked side in WODIs.

== Squads ==
India	Australia
Mithali Raj (c); Harmanpreet Kaur (vc); Ekta Bisht; Rajeshwari Gayakwad; Veda Krishnamurthy; Smriti Mandhana; Mona Meshram; Shikha Pandey; Sukanya Parida; Punam Raut; Jemimah Rodrigues; Deepti Sharma; Pooja Vastrakar; Sushma Verma (wk); Poonam Yadav	Meg Lanning (c); Rachael Haynes (vc); Nicole Bolton; Nicola Carey; Ashleigh Gardner; Alyssa Healy (wk); Jess Jonassen; Sophie Molineux; Beth Mooney; Ellyse Perry; Megan Schutt; Belinda Vakarewa; Elyse Villani; Amanda-Jade Wellington

== Tour matches ==
=== 1st 50-over match: India A Women v Australia Women ===
6 March 2018
Scorecard

Australia; 413/7 (50 overs)	v	India A Women; 92 (29.5 overs)
Beth Mooney 115 (83); Sarika Koli 3/67 (8 overs)		Anuja Patil 16 (16); Megan Schutt 3/24 (4.5 overs)

Australia Women won by 321 runs
Bandra Kurla Complex, Mumbai
Umpires: Bhatt Milind (Ind) and Sandeep Chavan (Ind)

- India A Women won the toss and elected to field.
- 14 players per side (11 batting, 11 fielding).

=== 2nd 50-over match: India A Women v Australia Women ===
8 March 2018
Scorecard

India A Women; 170 (46.2 overs)	v	Australia; 171/3 (26 overs)
Anuja Patil 49 (62); Amanda-Jade Wellington 3/30 (5.2 overs)		Meg Lanning 63 (55); Kavita Patil 1/21 (5 overs)

Australia Women won by 7 wickets
Bandra Kurla Complex, Mumbai
Umpires: Chandrakant Mhase (Ind) and Milind Pathak (Ind)

- India A Women won the toss and elected to bat.
- 14 players per side (11 batting, 11 fielding).

== WODI series ==
=== 1st WODI ===
ICC Women's Championship
12 March 2018
Scorecard

India; 200 (50 overs)	v	Australia; 202/2 (32.1 overs)
Pooja Vastrakar 51 (56); Jess Jonassen 4/30 (10 overs)		Nicole Bolton 100* (101); Shikha Pandey 1/38 (7 overs)

Australia Women won by 8 wickets
Reliance Stadium, Vadodara
Umpires: Jayaraman Madanagopal (Ind) and Nitin Pandit (Ind)
Player of the match: Nicole Bolton (Aus)

- India Women won the toss and elected to bat.
- Jemimah Rodrigues (Ind) and Nicola Carey (Aus) both made their WODI debuts.
- Nicole Bolton (Aus) scored her fourth century in WODIs.
- Shikha Pandey (Ind) took her 50th wicket in WODIs.
- Meg Lanning (Aus) scored her 3,000th run in WODIs.
- Points: Australia Women 2, India Women 0.

=== 2nd WODI ===
ICC Women's Championship
15 March 2018
Scorecard

Australia; 287/9 (50 overs)	v	India; 227 (49.2 overs)
Nicole Bolton 84 (88); Shikha Pandey 3/61 (10 overs)		Smriti Mandhana 67 (53); Jess Jonassen 3/51 (10 overs)

Australia Women won by 60 runs
Reliance Stadium, Vadodara
Umpires: Anil Dandekar (Ind) and Nand Kishore (Ind)
Player of the match: Nicole Bolton (Aus)

- India Women won the toss and elected to field.
- Points: Australia Women 2, India Women 0.

=== 3rd WODI ===
ICC Women's Championship
18 March 2018
Scorecard

Australia; 332/7 (50 overs)	v	India; 235 (44.4 overs)
Alyssa Healy 133 (115); Harmanpreet Kaur 2/51 (5.3 overs)		Smriti Mandhana 52 (42); Ashleigh Gardner 3/39 (8 overs)

Australia Women won by 97 runs
Reliance Stadium, Vadodara
Umpires: Anil Dandekar (Ind) and Nand Kishore (Ind)
Player of the match: Alyssa Healy (Aus)

- Australia Women won the toss and elected to bat.
- Alyssa Healy (Aus) scored her first century in WODIs.
- Points: Australia Women 2, India Women 0.
