= New Zealand women's cricket team in England in 2018 =

International cricket tour

	England women	New Zealand women
- Dates: 7 – 13 July 2018
Captains	Heather Knight	Suzie Bates

One Day International series
- Results: England women won the 3-match series 2–1
Most runs	Amy Jones (161)	Sophie Devine (164)
Most wickets	Sophie Ecclestone (6)	Leigh Kasperek (8)
- Player of the series: Amy Jones (Eng)

The New Zealand women's cricket team played the England women's cricket team in July 2018. The tour consisted of three Women's One Day Internationals (WODIs) which formed part of the 2017–20 ICC Women's Championship. Before the WODI matches, both teams played in a tri-series, with South Africa women being the third team. England Women won the three-match series 2–1.

== Squads ==
England	New Zealand
Heather Knight (c); Tammy Beaumont; Katherine Brunt; Kate Cross; Sophie Ecclestone; Georgia Elwiss; Katie George; Jenny Gunn; Alex Hartley; Amy Jones (wk); Laura Marsh; Nat Sciver; Anya Shrubsole; Sarah Taylor (wk); Lauren Winfield; Danni Wyatt	Suzie Bates (c); Bernadine Bezuidenhout; Sophie Devine; Kate Ebrahim; Maddy Green; Holly Huddleston; Hayley Jensen; Leigh Kasperek; Amelia Kerr; Katey Martin; Anna Peterson; Hannah Rowe; Amy Satterthwaite; Lea Tahuhu; Jess Watkin

== WODI series ==
=== 1st WODI ===
ICC Women's Championship
7 July 2018
11:00
Scorecard

England; 290/5 (50 overs)	v	New Zealand; 148 (35.3 overs)
Heather Knight 63 (58); Amelia Kerr 2/36 (10 overs)		Sophie Devine 33 (43); Nat Sciver 3/18 (4 overs)

England Women won by 142 runs
Headingley, Leeds
Umpires: Mike Burns (Eng) and David Millns (Eng)
Player of the match: Nat Sciver (Eng)

- England Women won the toss and elected to bat.
- Katie George (Eng) made her WODI debut.
- This was England Women's biggest win, in terms of runs, against New Zealand Women in WODIs.
- Points: England Women 2, New Zealand Women 0.

=== 2nd WODI ===
ICC Women's Championship
10 July 2018
13:00 (D/N)
Scorecard

England; 241 (48 overs)	v	New Zealand; 118 (38 overs)
Tammy Beaumont 67 (76); Sophie Devine 2/26 (6 overs)		Suzie Bates 24 (50); Sophie Ecclestone 3/14 (8 overs)

England Women won by 123 runs
County Cricket Ground, Derby
Umpires: Steve O'Shaughnessy (Eng) and Martin Saggers (Eng)
Player of the match: Tammy Beaumont (Eng)

- England Women won the toss and elected to bat.
- Points: England Women 2, New Zealand Women 0.

=== 3rd WODI ===
ICC Women's Championship
13 July 2018
14:00 (D/N)
Scorecard

England; 219 (47.4 overs)	v	New Zealand; 224/6 (44.4 overs)
Amy Jones 78 (95); Leigh Kasperek 5/39 (9.4 overs)		Sophie Devine 117* (116); Sophie Ecclestone 2/39 (10 overs)

New Zealand Women won by 4 wickets
Grace Road, Leicester
Umpires: David Millns (Eng) and Tim Robinson (Eng)
Player of the match: Sophie Devine (NZ)

- England Women won the toss and elected to bat.
- Leigh Kasperek (NZ) took her first five-wicket haul in WODIs.
- Points: New Zealand Women 2, England Women 0.
