= India women's cricket team in South Africa in 2017–18 =

International cricket tour

India women's tour of South Africa in 2017–18
	South Africa women	India women
- Dates: 5 – 24 February 2018
Captains	Dane van Niekerk	Mithali Raj (WODIs); Harmanpreet Kaur (WT20Is)

One Day International series
- Results: India women won the 3-match series 2–1
Most runs	Mignon du Preez (90)	Smriti Mandhana (219)
Most wickets	Shabnim Ismail (4)	Poonam Yadav (7)
- Player of the series: Smriti Mandhana (Ind)

Twenty20 International series
- Results: India women won the 5-match series 3–1
Most runs	Dane van Niekerk (144)	Mithali Raj (192)
Most wickets	Shabnim Ismail (6)	Anuja Patil (5); Shikha Pandey (5); Poonam Yadav (5)
- Player of the series: Mithali Raj (Ind)

The India women's cricket team played South Africa women's cricket team in February 2018. The tour consisted of three Women's One Day Internationals (WODIs) and five Women's Twenty20 Internationals (WT20Is). The WODI games were part of the 2017–20 ICC Women's Championship. India Women won the WODI series 2–1. India Women won the WT20I series 3–1, after the fourth match was washed out.

== Squads ==
WODIs		WT20Is	
South Africa	India	South Africa	India
Dane van Niekerk (c); Trisha Chetty; Mignon du Preez; Shabnim Ismail; Marizanne Kapp; Ayabonga Khaka; Masabata Klaas; Lizelle Lee; Suné Luus; Zintle Mali; Raisibe Ntozakhe; Andrie Steyn; Chloe Tryon; Laura Wolvaardt	Mithali Raj (c); Harmanpreet Kaur (vc); Taniya Bhatia (wk); Ekta Bisht; Rajeshwari Gayakwad; Jhulan Goswami; Veda Krishnamurthy; Smriti Mandhana; Mona Meshram; Shikha Pandey; Punam Raut; Jemimah Rodrigues; Deepti Sharma; Pooja Vastrakar; Sushma Verma (wk); Poonam Yadav	Dane van Niekerk (c); Trisha Chetty; Moseline Daniels; Nadine de Klerk; Mignon du Preez; Shabnim Ismail; Marizanne Kapp; Ayabonga Khaka; Odine Kirsten; Masabata Klaas; Lizelle Lee; Suné Luus; Raisibe Ntozakhe; Chloe Tryon	Harmanpreet Kaur (c); Smriti Mandhana (vc); Taniya Bhatia (wk); Rumeli Dhar; Rajeshwari Gayakwad; ~~Jhulan Goswami~~; Veda Krishnamurthy; Shikha Pandey; Nuzhat Parveen (wk); Anuja Patil; Mithali Raj; Jemimah Rodrigues; Deepti Sharma; Pooja Vastrakar; Poonam Yadav; Radha Yadav

Jhulan Goswami was ruled out of India's squad for the WT20I series due to a heel injury. Rumeli Dhar was added to India's squad as Goswami's replacement. Dhar last played international cricket for India in 2012.

== WODI series ==
=== 1st WODI ===
ICC Women's Championship
5 February 2018
10:00
Scorecard

India; 213/7 (50 overs)	v	South Africa; 125 (43.2 overs)
Smriti Mandhana 84 (98); Marizanne Kapp 2/26 (10 overs)		Dane van Niekerk 41 (87); Jhulan Goswami 4/24 (9.2 overs)

India Women won by 88 runs
Diamond Oval, Kimberley
Umpires: Siphelele Gasa (SA) and Stephen Harris (SA)
Player of the match: Smriti Mandhana (Ind)

- India Women won the toss and elected to bat.
- Points: India Women 2, South Africa Women 0.

=== 2nd WODI ===
ICC Women's Championship
7 February 2018
10:00
Scorecard

India; 302/3 (50 overs)	v	South Africa; 124 (30.5 overs)
Smriti Mandhana 135 (129); Suné Luus 1/31 (5 overs)		Lizelle Lee 73 (75); Poonam Yadav 4/24 (7.5 overs)

India Women won by 178 runs
Diamond Oval, Kimberley
Umpires: Lubabalo Gcuma (SA) and Stephen Harris (SA)
Player of the match: Smriti Mandhana (Ind)

- South Africa Women won the toss and elected to field.
- Trisha Chetty (SA) played her 100th WODI.
- Jhulan Goswami (Ind) became the first bowler to take 200 wickets in WODIs.
- Points: India Women 2, South Africa Women 0.

=== 3rd WODI ===
ICC Women's Championship
10 February 2018
10:00
Scorecard

India; 240/9 (50 overs)	v	South Africa; 241/3 (49.2 overs)
Deepti Sharma 79 (112); Shabnim Ismail 4/30 (9 overs)		Mignon du Preez 90* (111); Ekta Bisht 1/38 (10 overs)

South Africa Women won by 7 wickets
Senwes Park, Potchefstroom
Umpires: Siphelele Gasa (SA) and Lubabalo Gcuma (SA)
Player of the match: Mignon du Preez (SA)

- India Women won the toss and elected to bat
- Pooja Vastrakar (Ind) made her WODI debut.
- Veda Krishnamurthy became the youngest player for India Women to score 1,000 runs in WODIs.
- Points: South Africa Women 2, India Women 0.

== WT20I series ==
=== 1st WT20I ===
13 February 2018
13:00
Scorecard

South Africa; 164/4 (20 overs)	v	India; 168/3 (18.5 overs)
Dane van Niekerk 38 (31); Anuja Patil 2/23 (4 overs)		Mithali Raj 54* (48); Moseline Daniels 1/16 (4 overs)

India Women won by 7 wickets
Senwes Park, Potchefstroom
Umpires: Siphelele Gasa (SA) and Lubabalo Gcuma (SA)
Player of the match: Mithali Raj (Ind)

- India Women won the toss and elected to field.
- Nadine de Klerk, Raisibe Ntozakhe (SA), Jemimah Rodrigues, Radha Yadav, Pooja Vastrakar and Taniya Bhatia (Ind) all made their WT20I debuts.

=== 2nd WT20I ===
16 February 2018
13:00
Scorecard

South Africa; 142/7 (20 overs)	v	India; 144/1 (19.1 overs)
Suné Luus 33 (32); Poonam Yadav 2/18 (4 overs)		Mithali Raj 76* (61); Moseline Daniels 1/21 (4 overs)

India Women won by 9 wickets
Buffalo Park, East London
Umpires: Siphelele Gasa (SA) and Stephen Harris (SA)
Player of the match: Mithali Raj (Ind)

- India Women won the toss and elected to field.
- Mithali Raj (Ind) became the first player to score four consecutive half-centuries in WT20Is.

=== 3rd WT20I ===
18 February 2018
09:45
Scorecard

India; 133 (17.5 overs)	v	South Africa; 134/5 (19 overs)
Harmanpreet Kaur 48 (30); Shabnim Ismail 5/30 (3.5 overs)		Suné Luus 41 (34); Pooja Vastrakar 2/21 (4 overs)

South Africa Women won by 5 wickets
Wanderers Stadium, Johannesburg
Umpires: Lubabalo Gcuma and Stephen Harris
Player of the match: Shabnim Ismail (SA)

- South Africa Women won the toss and elected to field.
- Shabnim Ismail (SA) became the second bowler for South Africa to take a five-wicket haul in WT20Is.

=== 4th WT20I ===
21 February 2018
13:00
Scorecard

South Africa; 130/3 (15.3 overs)	v	India
Lizelle Lee 58* (38); Deepti Sharma 2/33 (3 overs)

No result
Centurion Park, Centurion
Umpires: Siphelele Gasa (SA) and Stephen Harris (SA)

- India Women won the toss and elected to field.
- Rain during South Africa Women's innings prevented any further play.

=== 5th WT20I ===
24 February 2018
13:00
Scorecard

India; 166/4 (20 overs)	v	South Africa; 112 (18 overs)
Mithali Raj 62 (50); Marizanne Kapp 1/22 (4 overs)		Marizanne Kapp 27 (34); Shikha Pandey 3/16 (3 overs)

India Women won by 54 runs
Newlands Cricket Ground, Cape Town
Umpires: Siphelele Gasa (SA) and Lubabalo Gcuma (SA)
Player of the match: Mithali Raj (Ind)

- South Africa Women won the toss and elected to field.
