= West Indies women's cricket team against Pakistan in 2018–19 =

International cricket tour

	Pakistan women	West Indies women
- Dates: 31 January – 11 February 2019
Captains	Bismah Maroof (Note: Javeria Khan captained Pakistan Women for the first WODI.)	Stafanie Taylor (WODIs); Merissa Aguilleira (WT20Is)

One Day International series
- Results: Pakistan women won the 3-match series 2–1
Most runs	Sidra Ameen (148)	Stafanie Taylor (158)
Most wickets	Diana Baig (7)	Deandra Dottin (6)
- Player of the series: Sidra Ameen (Pak)

Twenty20 International series
- Results: West Indies women won the 3-match series 2–1
Most runs	Bismah Maroof (88)	Deandra Dottin (158)
Most wickets	Anam Amin (5)	Shakera Selman (4)
- Player of the series: Nida Dar (Pak) and Deandra Dottin (WI)

The West Indies women's cricket team played the Pakistan women's cricket team in Pakistan and the United Arab Emirates in January and February 2019. The tour consisted of three Women's One Day Internationals (WODIs) and three Women's Twenty20 Internationals (WT20Is). The WODI games were part of the 2017–20 ICC Women's Championship.

The WT20I matches were played in Karachi, Pakistan. The West Indies women's team were visiting Pakistan for the first time in fifteen years, their previous tour being in March 2004 for a seven-WODI series. The team arrived in Pakistan on 30 January, and were escorted by more than 500 policemen in bullet-proof buses to their hotel. The West Indies' WT20I captain, Merissa Aguilleira, said "I'm pleased we can bring back cricket to Pakistan". Following the conclusion of the tour, West Indies' bowler Shakera Selman said that it was an "honour" to help Pakistan play in front of their home crowds and families.

The West Indies Women won the WT20I series 2–1. The second match ended in a tie, with the West Indies Women winning the Super Over. Pakistan's captain Bismah Maroof was injured in a practice session ahead of the WODI series. Javeria Khan captained the side in the first WODI in her absence. Pakistan Women won the WODI series 2–1, their first ever WODI series win against the West Indies Women.

== Squads ==
WODIs		WT20Is	
Pakistan	West Indies	Pakistan	West Indies
Bismah Maroof (c); Sidra Ameen; Aiman Anwer; Diana Baig; Nida Dar; Kainat Imtiaz; Javeria Khan; Nahida Khan; Sana Mir; Saba Nazir; Sidra Nawaz (wk); Aliya Riaz; Nashra Sandhu; Omaima Sohail	Stafanie Taylor (c); Merissa Aguilleira; Shemaine Campbelle; Shamilia Connell; Deandra Dottin; Afy Fletcher; Chinelle Henry; Kycia Knight; Natasha McLean; Anisa Mohammed; Chedean Nation; Karishma Ramharack; Shakera Selman; Rashada Williams	Bismah Maroof (c); Anam Amin; Sidra Ameen; Aiman Anwer; Diana Baig; Nida Dar; Iram Javed; Javeria Khan; Sana Mir; Sidra Nawaz (wk); Natalia Pervaiz; Aliya Riaz; Nashra Sandhu; Omaima Sohail	Merissa Aguilleira (c); Shemaine Campbelle; Shamilia Connell; Deandra Dottin; Afy Fletcher; Chinelle Henry; Kycia Knight; Natasha McLean; Anisa Mohammed; Chedean Nation; Karishma Ramharack; Shakera Selman; Rashada Williams

== WT20I series ==
=== 1st WT20I ===
31 January 2019
11:00
Scorecard

West Indies; 160/2 (20 overs)	v	Pakistan; 89 (18 overs)
Deandra Dottin 90* (60); Nashra Sandhu 1/23 (4 overs)		Bismah Maroof 38 (37); Shamilia Connell 3/29 (4 overs)

West Indies Women won by 71 runs
Southend Club Cricket Stadium, Karachi
Umpires: Rashid Riaz (Pak) and Asif Yaqoob (Pak)
Player of the match: Deandra Dottin (WI)

- West Indies Women won the toss and elected to bat.
- This was Pakistan's 100th WT20I match.

=== 2nd WT20I ===
1 February 2019
10:00
Scorecard

Pakistan; 132/4 (20 overs)	v	West Indies; 132/6 (20 overs)
Bismah Maroof 31 (34); Deandra Dottin 2/26 (4 overs)		Shemaine Campbelle 41 (44); Anam Amin 2/24 (4 overs)

Match tied
(West Indies Women won the Super Over)
Southend Club Cricket Stadium, Karachi
Umpires: Ahsan Raza (Pak) and Rashid Riaz (Pak)
Player of the match: Shemaine Campbelle (WI)

- Pakistan Women won the toss and elected to bat.

=== 3rd WT20I ===
3 February 2019
11:00
Scorecard

Pakistan; 150/6 (20 overs)	v	West Indies; 138/8 (20 overs)
Nida Dar 53 (40); Karishma Ramharack 2/20 (3 overs)		Deandra Dottin 46 (29); Anam Amin 3/34 (4 overs)

Pakistan Women won by 12 runs
Southend Club Cricket Stadium, Karachi
Umpires: Ahsan Raza (Pak) and Asif Yaqoob (Pak)
Player of the match: Nida Dar (Pak)

- Pakistan Women won the toss and elected to bat.
- Karishma Ramharack (WI) made her WT20I debut.
- Sana Mir (Pak) played in her 100th WT20I.

== WODI series ==
=== 1st WODI ===
ICC Women's Championship
7 February 2019
09:30
Scorecard

West Indies; 216/5 (50 overs)	v	Pakistan; 70 (29.5 overs)
Deandra Dottin 96 (139); Kainat Imtiaz 3/49 (9 overs)		Nahida Khan 23 (47); Deandra Dottin 3/14 (6 overs)

West Indies Women won by 146 runs
Dubai International Cricket Stadium, Dubai
Umpires: Rashid Riaz (Pak) and Asif Yaqoob (Pak)
Player of the match: Deandra Dottin (WI)

- West Indies Women won the toss and elected to bat.
- This was the first WODI match to be played at this venue.
- Points: West Indies Women 2, Pakistan Women 0.

=== 2nd WODI ===
ICC Women's Championship
9 February 2019
09:30
Scorecard

Pakistan; 240 (49.4 overs)	v	West Indies; 206 (49.4 overs)
Sidra Ameen 96 (121); Shakera Selman 2/33 (10 overs)		Natasha McLean 82 (76); Diana Baig 4/34 (10 overs)

Pakistan Women won by 34 runs
ICC Academy Ground, Dubai
Umpires: Rashid Riaz (Pak) and Asif Yaqoob (Pak)
Player of the match: Sidra Ameen (Pak)

- Pakistan Women won the toss and elected to bat.
- Points: Pakistan Women 2, West Indies Women 0.

=== 3rd WODI ===
ICC Women's Championship
11 February 2019
09:30
Scorecard

West Indies; 159 (47.3 overs)	v	Pakistan; 163/6 (47.2 overs)
Stafanie Taylor 52 (95); Nashra Sandhu 3/21 (10 overs)		Sidra Ameen 52 (107); Stafanie Taylor 2/17 (7 overs)

Pakistan Women won by 4 wickets
ICC Academy Ground, Dubai
Umpires: Rashid Riaz (Pak) and Asif Yaqoob (Pak)
Player of the match: Sidra Ameen (Pak)

- West Indies Women won the toss and elected to bat.
- Karishma Ramharack (WI) made her WODI debut.
- Nahida Khan became the fifth cricketer for Pakistan Women to score 1,000 runs in WODIs.
- Points: Pakistan Women 2, West Indies Women 0.
