= 2017–2020 ICC Women's Championship =

Cricket tournament

- Administrator: International Cricket Council
- Cricket format: One Day International
- Tournament format: Round robin
- Host: Various
- Champions: Australia (2nd title)
- Runners-up: England
- Most runs: (Australia) Alyssa Healy (1,000)
- Most wickets: (Pakistan) Sana Mir (35)

The 2017–2020 ICC Women's Championship was the second edition of the ICC Women's Championship, a Women's One Day International cricket (WODI) competition that was contested by eight teams, to determine qualification for the 2022 Women's Cricket World Cup. The top four teams, along with hosts New Zealand, qualified directly for the World Cup. The remaining three teams progressed to the 2021 Women's Cricket World Cup Qualifier tournament.

In the previous tournament, the first three WODIs counted towards qualification. However, for this tournament, the International Cricket Council (ICC) requested that additional matches are played as Women's Twenty20 Internationals (WT20Is). Inline with the updated ICC rules, two balls were used for the first time in WODI matches.

When originally announced in October 2017, the top three teams, along with hosts New Zealand, would qualify for the World Cup. In October 2018, the qualification structure was changed allowing the hosts plus the top four teams to qualify directly for 2022 World Cup.

The first set of fixtures was announced by the Pakistan Cricket Board (PCB), with Pakistan playing New Zealand in the United Arab Emirates in October 2017. The first round of fixtures to be played were between the West Indies and Sri Lanka, which started on 11 October 2017. In the opening fixture of the championship, the West Indies beat Sri Lanka by 6 wickets.

In March 2019, England beat Sri Lanka 3–0. The result meant that Sri Lanka Women could no longer qualify directly for the 2022 Women's Cricket World Cup, progressing to the 2021 Women's Cricket World Cup Qualifier tournament instead. In September 2019, the ICC confirmed that Australia were the first team to qualify for the World Cup. In October 2019, Australia took an unassailable points lead to win the ICC Women's Championship trophy for the second time in a row. In February 2020, the Australian team were presented with the ICC Women's Championship trophy, ahead of their Women's Twenty20 International (WT20I) match against India.

The COVID-19 pandemic forced the cancellation of the series between South Africa and Australia in March 2020. Two unscheduled series, New Zealand against Sri Lanka and Pakistan against India, were also thrown into doubt due to the pandemic. On 3 April 2020, New Zealand Cricket confirmed that their planned tour of Sri Lanka, scheduled to take place in April, had been cancelled due to the pandemic. However, the result of the series would have no impact on the final standings, as Sri Lanka had already been eliminated, and New Zealand had progressed to the World Cup as hosts. On 15 April 2020, the ICC confirmed that the points would be shared for the three series that were not played.

== Results ==
The breakdown of results is as follows. During each round, each team played against its opponent three times.

Round	Window	Home team	Away team	Date	Result
1	October 2017 – February 2018	West Indies	Sri Lanka	11 October 2017	3–0
1	October 2017 – February 2018	Australia	England	22 October 2017	2–1
1	October 2017 – February 2018	Pakistan	New Zealand	31 October 2017	1–2
1	October 2017 – February 2018	South Africa	India	5 February 2018	1–2
2	March – June 2018	New Zealand	West Indies	4 March 2018	3–0
2	March – June 2018	India	Australia	12 March 2018	0–3
2	March – June 2018	Sri Lanka	Pakistan	20 March 2018	0–3
2	March – June 2018	England	South Africa	9 June 2018	2–1
3	July – October 2018	England	New Zealand	7 July 2018	2–1
3	July – October 2018	Sri Lanka	India	11 September 2018	1–2
3	July – October 2018	West Indies	South Africa	16 September 2018	1–1
3	July – October 2018	Pakistan	Australia	18 October 2018	0–3
4	October 2018 – February 2019	New Zealand	India	24 January 2019	1–2
4	October 2018 – February 2019	Pakistan	West Indies	7 February 2019	2–1
4	October 2018 – February 2019	South Africa	Sri Lanka	11 February 2019	3–0
4	October 2018 – February 2019	Australia	New Zealand	22 February 2019	3–0
4	October 2018 – February 2019	India	England	22 February 2019	2–1
5	March – June 2019	Sri Lanka	England	16 March 2019	0–3
5	March – June 2019	South Africa	Pakistan	6 May 2019	1–1
5	March – June 2019	England	West Indies	6 June 2019	3–0
6	July – November 2019	West Indies	Australia	5 September 2019	0–3
6	July – November 2019	Australia	Sri Lanka	5 October 2019	3–0
6	July – November 2019	West Indies	India	1 November 2019	1–2
6	July – November 2019	Pakistan	India	November 2019	0–0 (Note: The round six fixtures between Pakistan and India should have taken place by the end of November 2019. However, the Pakistan Cricket Board (PCB) did not receive an invitation to play the series from the Board of Control for Cricket in India (BCCI), with the matter referred to the ICC Technical Committee. The series did not go ahead due to a force majeure event, with the BCCI demonstrating it could not get government clearance to play against Pakistan. Points were shared between the teams.)
7	December 2019 – April 2020	Pakistan	England	9 December 2019	0–2
7	December 2019 – April 2020	New Zealand	South Africa	25 January 2020	0–3
7	December 2019 – April 2020	South Africa	Australia	22 March 2020	0–0 (Note: Two round seven fixtures, South Africa hosting Australia and Sri Lanka hosting New Zealand, did not go ahead as scheduled due to the COVID-19 pandemic. Points were shared between the teams.)
7	December 2019 – April 2020	Sri Lanka	New Zealand	April 2020	0–0

== Points table ==
Pos	Team	Pld	W	L	T	NR	Pts	NRR	
1	Australia	21	17	1	0	3	37	1.835	Advance to the 2022 Women's Cricket World Cup.
2	England	21	14	6	0	1	29	1.267	Advance to the 2022 Women's Cricket World Cup.
3	South Africa	21	10	6	1	4	25	−0.309	Advance to the 2022 Women's Cricket World Cup.
4	India	21	10	8	0	3	23	0.465	Advance to the 2022 Women's Cricket World Cup.
5	Pakistan	21	7	9	1	4	19	−0.460	Advance to the 2021 Women's Cricket World Cup Qualifier.
6	New Zealand	21	7	11	0	3	17	−0.206	Automatically qualified for 2022 Women's Cricket World Cup as the hosts.
7	West Indies	21	6	14	0	1	13	−1.033	Advance to the 2021 Women's Cricket World Cup Qualifier.
8	Sri Lanka	21	1	17	0	3	5	−1.611	Advance to the 2021 Women's Cricket World Cup Qualifier.

== Fixtures ==
=== 2017–18 ===
==== West Indies v Sri Lanka ====
11 October 2017

Sri Lanka; 136 (49.4 overs)	v	West Indies; 138/4 (39 overs)

West Indies Women won by 6 wickets
Brian Lara Cricket Academy, Tarouba, Trinidad and Tobago
Points: West Indies Women 2, Sri Lanka Women 0

13 October 2017 (D/N)

Sri Lanka; 162 (46.3 overs)	v	West Indies; 163/3 (39.4 overs)

West Indies Women won by 7 wickets
Brian Lara Cricket Academy, Tarouba, Trinidad and Tobago
Points: West Indies Women 2, Sri Lanka Women 0

15 October 2017

West Indies; 182/8 (45 overs)	v	Sri Lanka; 142 (40.4 overs)

West Indies Women won by 40 runs
Brian Lara Cricket Academy, Tarouba, Trinidad and Tobago
Points: West Indies Women 2, Sri Lanka Women 0

==== Australia v England ====
22 October 2017

England; 9/228 (50 overs)	v	Australia; 8/231 (49.1 overs)

Australia Women won by 2 wickets
Allan Border Field, Brisbane
Points: Australia Women 2, England Women 0

26 October 2017 (D/N)

Australia; 6/296 (50 overs)	v	England; 209 (42.2 overs)

Australia Women won by 75 runs (DLS method)
Coffs Harbour International Stadium, Coffs Harbour
Points: Australia Women 2, England Women 0

29 October 2017

England; 8/284 (50 overs)	v	Australia; 9/257 (48 overs)

England Women won by 20 runs (DLS method)
Coffs Harbour International Stadium, Coffs Harbour
Points: England Women 2, Australia Women 0

==== Pakistan v New Zealand (in the UAE) ====
31 October 2017

New Zealand; 240/9 (50 overs)	v	Pakistan; 232 (48.3 overs)

New Zealand Women won by 8 runs
Sharjah Cricket Stadium, Sharjah
Points: New Zealand Women 2, Pakistan Women 0

2 November 2017

Pakistan; 147 (49.1 overs)	v	New Zealand; 148/3 (24 overs)

New Zealand Women won by 7 wickets
Sharjah Cricket Stadium, Sharjah
Points: New Zealand Women 2, Pakistan Women 0

5 November 2017

New Zealand; 155 (43.3 overs)	v	Pakistan; 156/5 (48.5 overs)

Pakistan Women won by 5 wickets
Sharjah Cricket Stadium, Sharjah
Points: Pakistan Women 2, New Zealand Women 0

==== South Africa v India ====
5 February 2018

India; 213/7 (50 overs)	v	South Africa; 125 (43.2 overs)

India Women won by 88 runs
Diamond Oval, Kimberley
Points: India Women 2, South Africa Women 0

7 February 2018

India; 302/3 (50 overs)	v	South Africa; 124 (30.5 overs)

India Women won by 178 runs
Diamond Oval, Kimberley
Points: India Women 2, South Africa Women 0

10 February 2018

India; 240/9 (50 overs)	v	South Africa; 241/3 (49.2 overs)

South Africa Women won by 7 wickets
Senwes Park, Potchefstroom
Points: South Africa Women 2, India Women 0

==== New Zealand v West Indies ====
4 March 2018

New Zealand; 278/9 (50 overs)	v	West Indies; 277/9 (50 overs)

New Zealand Women won by 1 run
Bert Sutcliffe Oval, Lincoln
Points: New Zealand Women 2, West Indies Women 0

8 March 2018

West Indies; 194 (48.1 overs)	v	New Zealand; 195/2 (30.4 overs)

New Zealand Women won by 8 wickets
Bert Sutcliffe Oval, Lincoln
Points: New Zealand Women 2, West Indies Women 0

11 March 2018

New Zealand; 310/5 (50 overs)	v	West Indies; 105 (34.5 overs)

New Zealand Women won by 205 runs
Hagley Oval, Christchurch
Points: New Zealand Women 2, West Indies Women 0

==== India v Australia ====
12 March 2018

India; 200 (50 overs)	v	Australia; 202/2 (32.1 overs)

Australia Women won by 8 wickets
Reliance Stadium, Vadodara
Points: Australia Women 2, India Women 0

15 March 2018

Australia; 287/9 (50 overs)	v	India; 227 (49.2 overs)

Australia Women won by 60 runs
Reliance Stadium, Vadodara
Points: Australia Women 2, India Women 0

18 March 2018

Australia; 332/7 (50 overs)	v	India; 235 (44.4 overs)

Australia Women won by 97 runs
Reliance Stadium, Vadodara
Points: Australia Women 2, India Women 0

==== Sri Lanka v Pakistan ====
20 March 2018

Pakistan; 250/6 (50 overs)	v	Sri Lanka; 181 (45.2 overs)

Pakistan Women won by 69 runs
Rangiri Dambulla International Stadium, Dambulla
Points: Pakistan Women 2, Sri Lanka Women 0

22 March 2018

Pakistan; 250/6 (50 overs)	v	Sri Lanka; 156 (37 overs)

Pakistan Women won by 94 runs
Rangiri Dambulla International Stadium, Dambulla
Points: Pakistan Women 2, Sri Lanka Women 0

24 March 2018

Pakistan; 215/9 (50 overs)	v	Sri Lanka; 107 (41.3 overs)

Pakistan Women won by 108 runs
Rangiri Dambulla International Stadium, Dambulla
Points: Pakistan Women 2, Sri Lanka Women 0

=== 2018 ===
==== England v South Africa ====
9 June 2018

England; 189/9 (50 overs)	v	South Africa; 193/3 (45.3 overs)

South Africa Women won by 7 wickets
New Road, Worcester
Points: South Africa Women 2, England Women 0

12 June 2018 (D/N)

England; 331/6 (50 overs)	v	South Africa; 262/9 (50 overs)

England Women won by 69 runs
County Cricket Ground, Hove
Points: England Women 2, South Africa Women 0

15 June 2018 (D/N)

South Africa; 228 (49.5 overs)	v	England; 232/3 (44 overs)

England Women won by 7 wickets
St Lawrence Ground, Canterbury
Points: England Women 2, South Africa Women 0

==== England v New Zealand ====
7 July 2018

England; 290/5 (50 overs)	v	New Zealand; 148 (35.3 overs)

England Women won by 142 runs
Headingley, Leeds
Points: England Women 2, New Zealand Women 0

10 July 2018 (D/N)

England; 241 (48 overs)	v	New Zealand; 118 (38 overs)

England Women won by 123 runs
County Cricket Ground, Derby
Points: England Women 2, New Zealand Women 0

13 June 2018 (D/N)

England; 219 (47.4 overs)	v	New Zealand; 224/6 (44.4 overs)

New Zealand Women won by 4 wickets
Grace Road, Leicester
Points: New Zealand Women 2, England Women 0

=== 2018–19 ===
==== Sri Lanka v India ====
11 September 2018

Sri Lanka; 98 (35.1 overs)	v	India; 100/1 (19.5 overs)

India Women won by 9 wickets
Galle International Stadium, Galle
Points: India Women 2, Sri Lanka Women 0

13 September 2018

India; 219 (50 overs)	v	Sri Lanka; 212 (48.1 overs)

India Women won by 7 runs
Galle International Stadium, Galle
Points: India Women 2, Sri Lanka Women 0

16 September 2018

India; 253/5 (50 overs)	v	Sri Lanka; 257/7 (49.5 overs)

Sri Lanka Women won by 3 wickets
FTZ Sports Complex, Katunayake
Points: Sri Lanka Women 2, India Women 0

==== West Indies v South Africa ====
16 September 2018

South Africa; 201/9 (50 overs)	v	West Indies; 161 (46 overs)

South Africa Women won by 40 runs
Kensington Oval, Bridgetown, Barbados
Points: South Africa Women 2, West Indies Women 0

19 September 2018

South Africa; 177/8 (50 overs)	v	West Indies

No result
Kensington Oval, Bridgetown, Barbados
Points: West Indies Women 1, South Africa Women 1

22 September 2018

West Indies; 292/5 (50 overs)	v	South Africa; 177 (42.3 overs)

West Indies Women won by 115 runs
Kensington Oval, Bridgetown, Barbados
Points: West Indies Women 2, South Africa Women 0

==== Pakistan v Australia (in Malaysia) ====
18 October 2018

Pakistan; 95 (37.2 overs)	v	Australia; 95/5 (22.2 overs)

Australia Women won by 5 wickets (DLS method)
Kinrara Academy Oval, Bandar Kinrara
Points: Australia Women 2, Pakistan Women 0

20 October 2018

Australia; 273/7 (50 overs)	v	Pakistan; 123 (40.1 overs)

Australia Women won by 150 runs
Kinrara Academy Oval, Bandar Kinrara
Points: Australia Women 2, Pakistan Women 0

22 October 2018

Australia; 324/7 (50 overs)	v	Pakistan; 235/7 (50 overs)

Australia Women won by 89 runs
Kinrara Academy Oval, Bandar Kinrara
Points: Australia Women 2, Pakistan Women 0

==== New Zealand v India ====
24 January 2019

New Zealand; 192 (48.4 overs)	v	India; 193/1 (33 overs)

India Women won by 9 wickets
McLean Park, Napier
Points: India Women 2, New Zealand Women 0

29 January 2019

New Zealand; 161 (44.2 overs)	v	India; 166/2 (35.2 overs)

India Women won by 8 wickets
Bay Oval, Mount Maunganui
Points: India Women 2, New Zealand Women 0

1 February 2019

India; 149 (44 overs)	v	New Zealand; 153/2 (29.2 overs)

New Zealand Women won by 8 wickets
Seddon Park, Hamilton
Points: New Zealand Women 2, India Women 0

==== Pakistan v West Indies (in the UAE) ====
7 February 2019

West Indies; 216/5 (50 overs)	v	Pakistan; 70 (29.5 overs)

West Indies Women won by 146 runs
Dubai International Cricket Stadium, Dubai
Points: West Indies Women 2, Pakistan Women 0

9 February 2019

Pakistan; 240 (49.4 overs)	v	West Indies; 206 (49.4 overs)

Pakistan Women won by 34 runs
ICC Academy Ground, Dubai
Points: Pakistan Women 2, West Indies Women 0

11 February 2019

West Indies; 159 (47.3 overs)	v	Pakistan; 163/6 (47.2 overs)

Pakistan Women won by 4 wickets
ICC Academy Ground, Dubai
Points: Pakistan Women 2, West Indies Women 0

==== South Africa v Sri Lanka ====
11 February 2019

South Africa; 225/7 (48 overs)	v	Sri Lanka; 218/9 (48 overs)

South Africa Women won by 7 runs
Senwes Park, Potchefstroom
Points: South Africa Women 2, Sri Lanka Women 0

14 February 2019

South Africa; 268/7 (50 overs)	v	Sri Lanka; 231 (46.2 overs)

South Africa Women won by 30 runs (DLS method)
Senwes Park, Potchefstroom
Points: South Africa Women 2, Sri Lanka Women 0

17 February 2019

Sri Lanka; 139 (44.2 overs)	v	South Africa; 141/4 (38.2 overs)

South Africa Women won by 6 wickets
Senwes Park, Potchefstroom
Points: South Africa Women 2, Sri Lanka Women 0

==== Australia v New Zealand ====
22 February 2019

Australia; 241 (49.4 overs)	v	New Zealand; 9/236 (50 overs)

Australia Women won by 5 runs
WACA Ground, Perth
Points: Australia Women 2, New Zealand Women 0

24 February 2019

Australia; 7/247 (50 overs)	v	New Zealand; 152 (37.5 overs)

Australia Women won by 95 runs
Karen Rolton Oval, Adelaide
Points: Australia Women 2, New Zealand Women 0

3 March 2019

New Zealand; 8/231 (50 overs)	v	Australia; 3/233 (47.5 overs)

Australia Women won by 7 wickets
Junction Oval, Melbourne
Points: Australia Women 2, New Zealand Women 0

==== India v England ====
22 February 2019

India; 202 (49.4 overs)	v	England; 136 (41 overs)

India Women won by 66 runs
Wankhede Stadium, Bombay
Points: India Women 2, England Women 0

25 February 2019

England; 161 (43.3 overs)	v	India; 162/3 (41.1 overs)

India Women won by 7 wickets
Wankhede Stadium, Bombay
Points: India Women 2, England Women 0

28 February 2019

India; 205/8 (50 overs)	v	England; 208/8 (48.5 overs)

England Women won by 2 wickets
Wankhede Stadium, Bombay
Points: England Women 2, India Women 0

==== Sri Lanka v England ====
16 March 2019

England; 331/7 (50 overs)	v	Sri Lanka; 159/8 (40 overs)

England Women won by 154 runs (DLS method)
Mahinda Rajapaksa International Cricket Stadium, Sooriyawewa
Points: England Women 2, Sri Lanka Women 0

18 March 2019

Sri Lanka; 187/9 (50 overs)	v	England; 188/4 (33.3 overs)

England Women won by 6 wickets
Mahinda Rajapaksa International Cricket Stadium, Sooriyawewa
Points: England Women 2, Sri Lanka Women 0

21 March 2019

Sri Lanka; 174 (50 overs)	v	England; 177/2 (26.1 overs)

England Women won by 8 wickets
FTZ Sports Complex, Katunayake
Points: England Women 2, Sri Lanka Women 0

=== 2019 ===
==== South Africa v Pakistan ====
6 May 2019

South Africa; 63 (22.5 overs)	v	Pakistan; 66/2 (14.4 overs)

Pakistan Women won by 8 wickets
Senwes Park, Potchefstroom
Points: Pakistan Women 2, South Africa Women 0

9 May 2019

Pakistan; 147 (42 overs)	v	South Africa; 148/2 (36.4 overs)

South Africa Women won by 8 wickets
Senwes Park, Potchefstroom
Points: South Africa Women 2, Pakistan Women 0

12 May 2019

South Africa; 265/6 (50 overs)	v	Pakistan; 265/9 (50 overs)

Match tied
Willowmoore Park, Benoni
Points: South Africa Women 1, Pakistan Women 1

==== England v West Indies ====
6 June 2019

England; 318/9 (50 overs)	v	West Indies; 110 (36 overs)

England Women won by 208 runs
Grace Road, Leicester
Points: England Women 2, West Indies Women 0

9 June 2019

England; 233/7 (50 overs)	v	West Indies; 87/6 (28 overs)

England Women won by 121 runs (DLS method)
New Road, Worcester
Points: England Women 2, West Indies Women 0

13 June 2019

England; 258/4 (50 overs)	v	West Indies; 131 (37.4 overs)

England Women won by 135 runs (DLS method)
County Cricket Ground, Chelmsford
Points: England Women 2, West Indies Women 0

=== 2019–20 ===
==== West Indies v Australia ====
5 September 2019

Australia; 308/4 (50 overs)	v	West Indies; 130 (37.3 overs)

Australia Women won by 178 runs
Coolidge Cricket Ground, Saint George, Antigua and Barbuda
Points: Australia Women 2, West Indies Women 0

9 September 2019

Australia; 308/2 (50 overs)	v	West Indies; 157/8 (50 overs)

Australia Women won by 151 runs
Sir Vivian Richards Stadium, Saint George, Antigua and Barbuda
Points: Australia Women 2, West Indies Women 0

11 September 2019

West Indies; 180 (50 overs)	v	Australia; 182/2 (31.1 overs)

Australia Women won by 8 wickets
Sir Vivian Richards Stadium, Saint George, Antigua and Barbuda
Points: Australia Women 2, West Indies Women 0

==== Australia v Sri Lanka ====
5 October 2019

Australia; 8/281 (50 overs)	v	Sri Lanka; 124 (41.3 overs)

Australia Women won by 157 runs
Allan Border Field, Brisbane
Points: Australia Women 2, Sri Lanka Women 0

7 October 2019

Australia; 8/282 (50 overs)	v	Sri Lanka; 9/172 (50 overs)

Australia Women won by 110 runs
Allan Border Field, Brisbane
Points: Australia Women 2, Sri Lanka Women 0

9 September 2019

Sri Lanka; 8/195 (50 overs)	v	Australia; 1/196 (26.5 overs)

Australia Women won by 9 wickets
Allan Border Field, Brisbane
Points: Australia Women 2, Sri Lanka Women 0

==== West Indies v India ====
1 November 2019

West Indies; 225/7 (50 overs)	v	India; 224 (50 overs)

West Indies Women won by 1 run
Sir Vivian Richards Stadium, Saint George, Antigua and Barbuda
Points: West Indies Women 2, India Women 0

3 November 2019

India; 191/6 (50 overs)	v	West Indies; 138 (47.2 overs)

India Women won by 53 runs
Sir Vivian Richards Stadium, Saint George, Antigua and Barbuda
Points: India Women 2, West Indies Women 0

6 September 2019

West Indies; 194 (50 overs)	v	India; 195/4 (41.2 overs)

India Women won by 6 wickets
Sir Vivian Richards Stadium, Saint George, Antigua and Barbuda
Points: India Women 2, West Indies Women 0

==== Pakistan v England (in Malaysia) ====
9 December 2019

England; 284/6 (50 overs)	v	Pakistan; 209 (44.4 overs)

England Women won by 75 runs
Kinrara Oval, Kuala Lumpur
Points: England Women 2, Pakistan Women 0

12 December 2019

England; 327/4 (50 overs)	v	Pakistan; 200 (44.5 overs)

England Women won by 127 runs
Kinrara Oval, Kuala Lumpur
Points: England Women 2, Pakistan Women 0

14 December 2019

Pakistan; 145/8 (37.4 overs)	v	England

No result
Kinrara Oval, Kuala Lumpur
Points: Pakistan Women 1, England Women 1

==== New Zealand v South Africa ====
25 January 2020

New Zealand; 259/9 (50 overs)	v	South Africa; 260/3 (48.3 overs)

South Africa Women won by 7 wickets
Eden Park Outer Oval, Auckland
Points: South Africa Women 2, New Zealand Women 0

27 January 2020

New Zealand; 115 (36 overs)	v	South Africa; 117/2 (23.5 overs)

South Africa Women won by 8 wickets
Eden Park Outer Oval, Auckland
Points: South Africa Women 2, New Zealand Women 0

30 January 2020

New Zealand; 149 (38.1 overs)	v	South Africa; 150/4 (37.2 overs)

South Africa Women won by 6 wickets
Seddon Park, Hamilton
Points: South Africa Women 2, New Zealand Women 0

== Statistics ==
=== Most runs ===
Player	Team	Mat	Inns	Runs	Ave
Alyssa Healy	Australia	18	18	1000	58.82
Tammy Beaumont	England	21	20	945	47.25
Smriti Mandhana	India	16	16	911	65.07
Stafanie Taylor	West Indies	21	19	843	49.58
Sophie Devine	New Zealand	18	18	812	54.13
Source: ESPNcricinfo

=== Most wickets ===
Player	Team	Mat	Inns	Wkts	Ave
Sana Mir	Pakistan	15	15	35	13.74
Jess Jonassen	Australia	15	15	30	15.83
Megan Schutt	Australia	16	16	30	17.20
Poonam Yadav	India	18	18	29	22.82
Afy Fletcher	West Indies	20	20	29	26.00
Source: ESPNcricinfo
