= West Indies women's cricket team in England in 2019 =

International cricket tour

	England women	West Indies women
- Dates: 6 – 25 June 2019
Captains	Heather Knight	Stafanie Taylor

One Day International series
- Results: England women won the 3-match series 3–0
Most runs	Amy Jones (189)	Chedean Nation (66)
Most wickets	Kate Cross (5); Sophie Ecclestone (5)	Hayley Matthews (7)
- Player of the series: Amy Jones (Eng)

Twenty20 International series
- Results: England women won the 3-match series 1–0
Most runs	Danni Wyatt (81)	Stacy-Ann King (43)
Most wickets	Katherine Brunt (2); Linsey Smith (2)	Shamilia Connell (1); Afy Fletcher (1); Chinelle Henry (1); Hayley Matthews (1)

The West Indies women's cricket team toured England to play the England women's cricket team in June 2019. The tour consisted of three Women's One Day Internationals (WODIs) and three Women's Twenty20 Internationals (WT20Is). The WODI games were part of the 2017–20 ICC Women's Championship. Prior to their visit to England, the West Indies women's team also toured Ireland to play three WT20I matches. England women won the WODI series 3–0. With the victory in the third WODI, it was England's 13th-consecutive win across all formats. England won the T20I series 1–0, after two matches were abandoned due to rain.

== Squads ==
WODIs		WT20Is	
England	West Indies	England	West Indies
Heather Knight (c); Tammy Beaumont; Katherine Brunt; Kate Cross; Sophie Ecclestone; Alex Hartley; Jenny Gunn; Amy Jones (wk); Laura Marsh; Nat Sciver; Anya Shrubsole; Bryony Smith; Sarah Taylor (wk); Fran Wilson; Lauren Winfield; Danni Wyatt	Stafanie Taylor (c); Hayley Matthews (vc); Shemaine Campbelle; Shamilia Connell; Britney Cooper; ~~Deandra Dottin~~; Afy Fletcher; Chinelle Henry; Stacy-Ann King; Kycia Knight; Kyshona Knight; Natasha McLean; Chedean Nation; Karishma Ramharack; Shakera Selman	Heather Knight (c); Tammy Beaumont; Katherine Brunt; Kate Cross; Sophie Ecclestone; Jenny Gunn; Amy Jones (wk); Laura Marsh; Nat Sciver; Anya Shrubsole; Linsey Smith; Sarah Taylor (wk); Fran Wilson; Lauren Winfield; Danni Wyatt	Stafanie Taylor (c); Hayley Matthews (vc); Shemaine Campbelle; Shamilia Connell; Britney Cooper; ~~Deandra Dottin~~; Afy Fletcher; Chinelle Henry; Stacy-Ann King; Kycia Knight; Kyshona Knight; Natasha McLean; Chedean Nation; Karishma Ramharack; Shakera Selman

Reniece Boyce, Shanika Bruce, Britney Cooper, Shabika Gajnabi, Sheneta Grimmond and Shawnisha Hector were also named as reserve players for the West Indies. Ahead of the tour, Deandra Dottin was ruled out of the West Indies' squad due to injury, and was replaced by Britney Cooper. Bryony Smith was added to England's squad for the third WODI match of the series.

== WODI series ==
=== 1st WODI ===
ICC Women's Championship
6 June 2019
14:00 (D/N)
Scorecard

England; 318/9 (50 overs)	v	West Indies; 110 (36 overs)
Heather Knight 94 (94); Hayley Matthews 4/57 (10 overs)		Chedean Nation 41 (73); Laura Marsh 3/30 (9 overs)

England Women won by 208 runs
Grace Road, Leicester
Umpires: Graham Lloyd (Eng) and Alex Wharf (Eng)
Player of the match: Amy Jones (Eng)

- England Women won the toss and elected to bat.
- Tammy Beaumont (Eng) scored her 2,000th run in WODIs.
- England Women made their highest score against the West Indies Women in WODIs.
- This was England Women's biggest winning margin, in terms of runs, against the West Indies Women.
- Points: England Women 2, West Indies Women 0.

=== 2nd WODI ===
ICC Women's Championship
9 June 2019
11:00
Scorecard

England; 233/7 (41 overs)	v	West Indies; 87/6 (28 overs)
Tammy Beaumont 61 (83); Afy Fletcher 3/48 (8 overs)		Shemaine Campbelle 29 (49); Kate Cross 2/4 (4 overs)

England Women won by 121 runs (DLS method)
New Road, Worcester
Umpires: David Millns (Eng) and Sue Redfern (Eng)
Player of the match: Anya Shrubsole (Eng)

- England Women won the toss and elected to bat.
- West Indies Women were set a revised target of 209 runs from 28 overs due to rain.
- Laura Marsh (Eng) played in her 100th WODI.
- Points: England Women 2, West Indies Women 0.

=== 3rd WODI ===
ICC Women's Championship
13 June 2019
14:00 (D/N)
Scorecard

England; 258/4 (39 overs)	v	West Indies; 131 (37.4 overs)
Amy Jones 80 (83); Hayley Matthews 2/52 (8 overs)		Kycia Knight 38 (59); Kate Cross 2/16 (6 overs)

England Women won by 135 runs (DLS method)
County Cricket Ground, Chelmsford
Umpires: David Millns (Eng) and Sue Redfern (Eng)
Player of the match: Amy Jones (Eng)

- West Indies Women won the toss and elected to field.
- West Indies Women were set a revised target of 267 runs from 39 overs due to rain.
- Bryony Smith (Eng) made her WODI debut.
- Points: England Women 2, West Indies Women 0.

== WT20I series ==
=== 1st WT20I ===
18 June 2019
19:00 (N)
Scorecard

England	v	West Indies

Match abandoned
County Cricket Ground, Northampton
Umpires: Rob Bailey (Eng) and Jeremy Lloyds (Eng)

- No toss.
- No play was possible due to rain.

=== 2nd WT20I ===
21 June 2019
19:00 (N)
Scorecard

England; 180/6 (20 overs)	v	West Indies; 138/9 (20 overs)
Danni Wyatt 81 (55); Hayley Matthews 1/28 (4 overs)		Stacy-Ann King 43 (34); Linsey Smith 2/21 (4 overs)

England Women won by 42 runs
County Cricket Ground, Northampton
Umpires: Rob Bailey (Eng) and Mike Burns (Eng)
Player of the match: Danni Wyatt (Eng)

- England Women won the toss and elected to bat.

=== 3rd WT20I ===
25 June 2019
19:00 (N)
Scorecard

England	v	West Indies

Match abandoned
County Cricket Ground, Derby
Umpires: Mike Burns (Eng) and Jeremy Lloyds (Eng)

- No toss.
- No play was possible due to rain.
