= Australia women's cricket team against Pakistan in Malaysia in 2018–19 =

International cricket tour

	Pakistan women	Australia women
- Dates: 18 October – 29 October 2018
Captains	Javeria Khan	Meg Lanning (Note: Rachael Haynes captained Australia in the third WT20I.)

One Day International series
- Results: Australia women won the 3-match series 3–0
Most runs	Nahida Khan (120)	Meg Lanning (142)
Most wickets	Sana Mir (7)	Sophie Molineux (6); Ashleigh Gardner (6)
- Player of the series: Meg Lanning (Aus)

Twenty20 International series
- Results: Australia women won the 3-match series 3–0
Most runs	Omaima Sohail (72)	Alyssa Healy (132)
Most wickets	Aliya Riaz (2); Nida Dar (2)	Sophie Molineux (7)
- Player of the series: Omaima Sohail (Pak) and Alyssa Healy (Aus)

The Australia women's cricket team played the Pakistan women's cricket team in Malaysia in October 2018. The tour consisted of three Women's One Day Internationals (WODIs) and three Women's Twenty20 Internationals (WT20Is). The WODI games were part of the 2017–20 ICC Women's Championship. It was the first women's bilateral series were played in Malaysia, with all the matches were played at the Kinrara Academy Oval. Australia women won both the WODI and WT20I series 3–0.

== Squads ==
WODIs		WT20Is	
Pakistan	Australia	Pakistan	Australia
Javeria Khan (c); Muneeba Ali; Sidra Ameen; Anam Amin; Aiman Anwer; Diana Baig; Nida Dar; Nahida Khan; Sana Mir; Sidra Nawaz (wk); Natalia Pervaiz; Aliya Riaz; Nashra Sandhu; Omaima Sohail; Ayesha Zafar	Meg Lanning (c); Nicole Bolton; Nicola Carey; Ashleigh Gardner; Rachael Haynes; Alyssa Healy; Delissa Kimmince; Sophie Molineux; Beth Mooney; Ellyse Perry; Megan Schutt; Elyse Villani; Tayla Vlaeminck; Georgia Wareham	Javeria Khan (c); Muneeba Ali; Sidra Ameen; Anam Amin; Aiman Anwer; Diana Baig; Nida Dar; Nahida Khan; Bismah Maroof; Sana Mir; Sidra Nawaz (wk); Natalia Pervaiz; Aliya Riaz; Nashra Sandhu; Omaima Sohail; Ayesha Zafar	Meg Lanning (c); Nicole Bolton; Nicola Carey; Ashleigh Gardner; Rachael Haynes; Alyssa Healy; Jess Jonassen; Delissa Kimmince; Sophie Molineux; Beth Mooney; Ellyse Perry; Megan Schutt; Elyse Villani; Tayla Vlaeminck; Georgia Wareham

== WODI series ==
=== 1st WODI ===
ICC Women's Championship
18 October 2018
09:30
Scorecard

Pakistan; 95 (37.2 overs)	v	Australia; 95/5 (22.2 overs)
Javeria Khan 21 (27); Megan Schutt 3/17 (7.2 overs)		Alyssa Healy 26 (26); Sana Mir 3/26 (7 overs)

Australia Women won by 5 wickets (DLS method)
Kinrara Academy Oval, Bandar Kinrara
Umpires: Faisal Afridi (Pak) and Zameer Haider (Pak)
Player of the match: Megan Schutt (Aus)

- Pakistan Women won the toss and elected to bat.
- Australian Women were set a revised target of 92 runs from 41 overs due to rain.
- Georgia Wareham and Sophie Molineux (Aus) both made their WODI debuts.
- Points: Australia Women 2, Pakistan Women 0.

=== 2nd WODI ===
ICC Women's Championship
20 October 2018
09:30
Scorecard

Australia; 273/7 (50 overs)	v	Pakistan; 123 (40.1 overs)
Meg Lanning 124 (106); Nashra Sandhu 3/54 (10 overs)		Nahida Khan 66 (114); Sophie Molineux 4/14 (9 overs)

Australia Women won by 150 runs
Kinrara Academy Oval, Bandar Kinrara
Umpires: Faisal Afridi (Pak) and Zameer Haider (Pak)
Player of the match: Meg Lanning (Aus)

- Australia Women won the toss and elected to bat.
- Points: Australia Women 2, Pakistan Women 0.

=== 3rd WODI ===
ICC Women's Championship
22 October 2018
09:30
Scorecard

Australia; 324/7 (50 overs)	v	Pakistan; 235/7 (50 overs)
Alyssa Healy 97 (75); Sana Mir 3/53 (10 overs)		Aliya Riaz 51 (69); Ashleigh Gardner 3/44 (10 overs)

Australia Women won by 89 runs
Kinrara Academy Oval, Bandar Kinrara
Umpires: Faisal Afridi (Pak) and Zameer Haider (Pak)
Player of the match: Ashleigh Gardner (Aus)

- Australia Women won the toss and elected to bat.
- Tayla Vlaeminck (Aus) made her WODI debut.
- Ellyse Perry (Aus) played in her 100th WODI and 200th international cricket match.
- Points: Australia Women 2, Pakistan Women 0.

== WT20I series ==
=== 1st WT20I ===
25 October 2018
10:00
Scorecard

Australia; 195/3 (20 overs)	v	Pakistan; 131/7 (20 overs)
Ashleigh Gardner 63* (37); Nashra Sandhu 1/23 (2 overs)		Nahida Khan 43 (32); Sophie Molineux 4/16 (4 overs)

Australia Women won by 64 runs
Kinrara Academy Oval, Bandar Kinrara
Umpires: Faisal Afridi (Pak) and Zameer Haider (Pak)
Player of the match: Sophie Molineux (Aus)

- Australia Women won the toss and elected to bat.
- Omaima Sohail (Pak) made her WT20I debut.

=== 2nd WT20I ===
27 October 2018
18:00 (D/N)
Scorecard

Pakistan; 101 (19.5 overs)	v	Australia; 104/4 (17 overs)
Omaima Sohail 43 (38); Georgia Wareham 3/12 (2 overs)		Beth Mooney 29 (29); Nida Dar 1/16 (4 overs); Aliya Riaz 1/16 (4 overs)

Australia Women won by 6 wickets
Kinrara Academy Oval, Bandar Kinrara
Umpires: Faisal Afridi (Pak) and Zameer Haider (Pak)
Player of the match: Georgia Wareham (Aus)

- Australia Women won the toss and elected to field.

=== 3rd WT20I ===
29 October 2018
10:00
Scorecard

Pakistan; 97/8 (20 overs)	v	Australia; 98/1 (10.2 overs)
Bismah Maroof 34 (43); Megan Schutt 2/15 (4 overs)		Alyssa Healy 67* (41); Natalia Pervaiz 1/17 (2 overs)

Australia Women won by 9 wickets
Kinrara Academy Oval, Bandar Kinrara
Umpires: Zameer Haider (Pak) and Viswanadan Kalidas (Mas)
Player of the match: Alyssa Healy (Aus)

- Australia Women won the toss and elected to field.
