= Australia women's cricket team in South Africa in 2019–20 =

International cricket tour

	South Africa women	Australia women
- Dates: 19 March – 4 April 2020
Captains	Dane van Niekerk	

One Day International series

Twenty20 International series

The Australia women's cricket team were scheduled to play the South Africa women's cricket team in March and April 2020. The tour was scheduled to consist of three Women's One Day Internationals (WODIs), which formed part of the 2017–20 ICC Women's Championship, and three Women's Twenty20 International (WT20I) matches.

On 11 March 2020, South Africa named their squad for the WODI matches. However, the following day, Australia confirmed they would not be touring South Africa due to the COVID-19 pandemic, becoming the first major international series not to go ahead as planned due to coronavirus. It would have been the first time that the Australia women's team had toured South Africa for a bilateral cricket series.

== Squads ==
WODIs		WT20Is	
South Africa	Australia	South Africa	Australia
Dane van Niekerk (c); Trisha Chetty; Shabnim Ismail; Marizanne Kapp; Ayabonga Khaka; Masabata Klaas; Nadine de Klerk; Lizelle Lee; Suné Luus; Nonkululeko Mlaba; Mignon du Preez; Tumi Sekhukhune; Chloe Tryon; Laura Wolvaardt			

== Tour match ==
=== One-day match: TBC vs Australia ===
19 March 2020
10:00
Scorecard

TBC	v	Australia

Chatsworth Oval, Durban

== WODI series ==
=== 1st WODI ===
ICC Women's Championship
22 March 2020
10:00
Scorecard

South Africa	v	Australia

Kingsmead Cricket Ground, Durban

=== 2nd WODI ===
ICC Women's Championship
25 March 2020
10:00
Scorecard

South Africa	v	Australia

City Oval, Pietermaritzburg

=== 3rd WODI ===
ICC Women's Championship
28 March 2020
10:00
Scorecard

South Africa	v	Australia

Buffalo Park, East London

== WT20I series ==
=== 1st WT20I ===
31 March 2020
13:00
Scorecard

South Africa	v	Australia

Buffalo Park, East London

=== 2nd WT20I ===
3 April 2020
13:00
Scorecard

South Africa	v	Australia

Willowmoore Park, Benoni

=== 3rd WT20I ===
4 April 2020
13:00
Scorecard

South Africa	v	Australia

Willowmoore Park, Benoni
