= Lauren Down =

New Zealand cricketer (born 1995)

Personal information
- Full name: Lauren Renee Down
- Born: 7 May 1995 (age 31); Auckland, New Zealand
- Batting: Right-handed
- Bowling: Right-arm medium
- Role: Batter

International information
- National side: New Zealand (2018–2024)
- ODI debut (cap 136): 4 March 2018 v West Indies
- Last ODI: 29 October 2024 v India
- T20I debut (cap 55): 9 February 2020 v South Africa
- Last T20I: 7 December 2022 v Bangladesh

Domestic team information
- Years: Team
- 2011/12–2022/23: Auckland
- 2016: Oxfordshire
- 2020/21: Perth Scorchers

Career statistics
Competition	WODI	WT20I
Matches	33	13
Runs scored	486	93
Batting average	17.35	13.28
100s/50s	0/3	0/0
Top score	90	17
Catches/stumpings	9/–	5/–
- Source: Cricinfo, 29 October 2024

Lauren Renee Down (born 7 May 1995) is a former New Zealand cricketer who has played for Auckland and New Zealand. She made her Women's One Day International cricket (WODI) debut for New Zealand Women against the West Indies Women on 4 March 2018. In January 2020, she was named in New Zealand's Women's Twenty20 International (WT20I) squad for their series against South Africa. Later the same month, she was named in New Zealand's squad for the 2020 ICC Women's T20 World Cup in Australia. She made her WT20I debut for New Zealand, against South Africa, on 9 February 2020.

In February 2022, she was named in New Zealand's team for the 2022 Women's Cricket World Cup in New Zealand. However, Down was ruled out of New Zealand's squad after suffering an injury during the fifth WODI match against India. In June 2022, Down was named in New Zealand's team for the cricket tournament at the 2022 Commonwealth Games in Birmingham, England, but was later ruled out of the tournament.

Ahead of the 2023–24 season, it was announced that Down was taking a break from cricket for personal reasons.

She returned to the New Zealand squad for their tour of England in June 2024 and was also named in the travelling party for their One-Day International series in India in October that year.

On 19 February 2026, she announced her retirement from all forms of cricket.
