= Pooja Vastrakar =

Indian cricketer (born 1999)

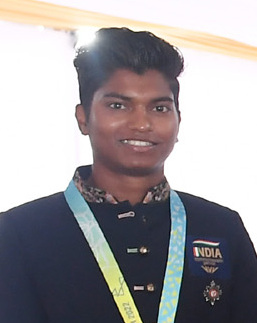
- Vastrakar in August 2022

Personal information
- Born: 25 September 1999 (age 27); Shahdol, Madhya Pradesh, India
- Batting: Right-handed
- Bowling: Right-arm medium-fast
- Role: All-rounder

International information
- National side: India (2018–present)
- Test debut (cap 88): 16 June 2021 v England
- Last Test: 30 September 2021 v Australia
- ODI debut (cap 122): 10 February 2018 v South Africa
- Last ODI: 24 September 2022 v England
- ODI shirt no.: 34
- T20I debut (cap 57): 13 February 2018 v South Africa
- Last T20I: 20 February 2023 v Ireland
- T20I shirt no.: 34

Domestic team information
- Years: Team
- 2012/13–present: Madhya Pradesh
- 2018–2022: Supernovas
- 2022/23: Brisbane Heat
- 2023–2025: Mumbai Indians
- 2026–present: Royal Challengers Bengaluru

Career statistics
Competition	WTest	WODI	WT20I
Matches	2	26	40
Runs scored	37	463	256
Batting average	12.33	23.15	16.00
100s/50s	0/0	0/3	0/0
Top score	13	67	37*
Balls bowled	244	816	607
Wickets	5	20	26
Bowling average	23.00	37.55	23.38
5 wickets in innings	0	0	0
10 wickets in match	0	0	0
Best bowling	3/49	4/34	3/6
Catches/stumpings	0/–	4/–	7/–
Medal record
Representing India
Women's cricket
Commonwealth Games
Silver medal – second place	2022 Birmingham	Team
Asian Games
Gold medal – first place	2022 Hangzhou	Team
Asia Cup
Winner	2022 Bangladesh	Team
Runner-up	2024 Sri Lanka	Team
- Source: ESPNcricinfo, 19 February 2023

Pooja Vastrakar (born 25 September 1999) is an Indian cricketer who plays for the India national team as an all-rounder. She is a right-arm medium-fast bowler and right-handed batter. She made her international debut for India in 2018, against South Africa. In domestic cricket, she represents Madhya Pradesh.

== Early life ==
Vastrakar initially started playing cricket with the boys near her neighborhood in Shahdol, Madhya Pradesh. She later started going to the stadium and practiced net batting where the coach Ashutosh Shrivastava realized her talent and started her formal training. She started off as a batter and later on when she joined the Madhya Pradesh team, she started fast bowling alongside her batting. At the age of 15, she was a part of India Green Women Squad. In 2016, while Vastrakar was fielding during a senior women's domestic match, she twisted her knee. This led to her getting surgery done for her anterior cruciate ligament tear which put her National call-up in jeopardy. The Challenger Trophy in 2018 played a pivotal role in Vastrakar's selection for India's South Africa tour.

Vastrakar's father is a retired employee of Bharat Sanchar Nigam Limited (BSNL). Her mother died when she was ten years old. She has four sisters and two brothers and is the youngest of seven siblings.

== International career ==
She made her Women's One Day International cricket (WODI) debut for India Women against South Africa Women on 10 February 2018. She made her Women's Twenty20 International cricket (WT20I) debut for India Women against South Africa Women on 13 February 2018.

In October 2018, she was named in India's squad for the 2018 ICC Women's World Twenty20 tournament in the West Indies. However, she suffered an injury during a warm-up match, and was later ruled out of the tournament. In January 2020, she was named in India's squad for the 2020 ICC Women's T20 World Cup in Australia.

In May 2021, she was named in India's Test squad for their one-off match against the England women's cricket team. Vastrakar made her Test debut on 16 June 2021, for India against England. In January 2022, she was named in India's team for the 2022 Women's Cricket World Cup in New Zealand. She scored 156 runs averaging 26.00, and took 10 wickets averaging 18.30 in the tournament. In July 2022, she was named in India's team for the cricket tournament at the 2022 Commonwealth Games in Birmingham, England. She was named in the India squad for the 2024 ICC Women's T20 World Cup.
