= Rosemary Mair =

New Zealand cricketer

Personal information
- Full name: Rosemary Alison Mair
- Born: 7 November 1998 (age 28); Napier, New Zealand
- Batting: Right-handed
- Bowling: Right-arm medium
- Role: Bowler

International information
- National side: New Zealand
- ODI debut (cap 139): 22 February 2019 v Australia
- Last ODI: 26 March 2022 v Pakistan
- T20I debut (cap 53): 6 February 2019 v India
- Last T20I: 20 October 2024 v New Zealand
- T20I shirt no.: 32

Domestic team information
- Years: Team
- 2014/15–present: Central Districts
- 2020/21: Melbourne Stars
- 2020/21: Melbourne Renegades

Career statistics
| Competition | WODI | WT20I |
|---|---|---|
| Matches | 29 | 43 |
| Runs scored | 36 | 38 |
| Batting average | 6.00 | 9.50 |
| 100s/50s | 0/0 | 0/0 |
| Top score | 7* | 13* |
| Balls bowled | 1,261 | 583 |
| Wickets | 28 | 31 |
| Bowling average | 39.11 | 28.65 |
| 5 wickets in innings | 0 | 0 |
| 10 wickets in match | 0 | 0 |
| Best bowling | 5/50 | 4/19 |
| Catches/stumpings | 4/– | 0/– |
Medal record
Women's cricket
Representing New Zealand
ICC T20 World Cup
| Winner | 2024 UAE |
Commonwealth Games
| Bronze medal – third place | 2022 Birmingham |
- Source: Cricinfo, 21 October 2024

Rosemary Alison Mair (born 7 November 1998) is a New Zealand cricketer. In January 2019, she was named in New Zealand's squad for their series against India.

Mair made her Women's Twenty20 International cricket (WT20I) debut for New Zealand against India Women on 6 February 2019. She made her Women's One Day International cricket (WODI) debut for New Zealand against Australia Women on 22 February 2019. In January 2020, she was named in New Zealand's squad for the 2020 ICC Women's T20 World Cup in Australia. In February 2022, she was named in New Zealand's team for the 2022 Women's Cricket World Cup in New Zealand. In June 2022, Mair was named in New Zealand's team for the cricket tournament at the 2022 Commonwealth Games in Birmingham, England.

In September 2024 she was named in the New Zealand squad for the 2024 ICC Women's T20 World Cup. Mair took a career-best 4/19 in the group stage win over India. She then recorded figures of 3/25 from her four overs against South Africa in the final as New Zealand won the tournament.
