= Ama Kanchana =

Sri Lankan cricketer

Personal information
- Full name: Kathira Arachchige Dona Ama Kanchana
- Born: 7 April 1991 (age 35); Negombo, Sri Lanka
- Batting: Right-handed
- Bowling: Right arm fast-medium

International information
- National side: Sri Lanka
- ODI debut (cap 59): 15 October 2014 v South Africa
- Last ODI: 7 July 2022 v India
- ODI shirt no.: 97
- T20I debut (cap 29): 3 March 2013 v West Indies
- Last T20I: 16 February 2023 v Australia
- T20I shirt no.: 97

Career statistics
Competition	WODI	WT20I
Matches	33	39
Runs scored	345	182
Batting average	12.77	7.00
100s/50s	0/0	0/0
Top score	47*	17
Balls bowled	945	364
Wickets	25	13
Bowling average	34.92	37.76
5 wickets in innings	0	0
10 wickets in match	0	0
Best bowling	3/26	3/22
Catches/stumpings	14/–	5/–
Medal record
Representing Sri Lanka
Women's Cricket
Women's Asia Cup
Winner	2024 Sri Lanka
- Source: ESPNcricinfo, 12 February 2023

Kathira Arachchige Dona Ama Kanchana (born 7 April 1991) is a Sri Lankan cricketer who plays for Sri Lanka's women's cricket team. She made her One Day International (ODI) debut against South Africa on 15 October 2014.

Along with Eshani Kaushalya, she holds the record for the highest eighth-wicket partnership (39 runs) in a Women's Twenty20 International (WT20I).

In October 2018, she was named in Sri Lanka's squad for the 2018 ICC Women's World Twenty20 tournament in the West Indies. In January 2020, she was named in Sri Lanka's squad for the 2020 ICC Women's T20 World Cup in Australia. In October 2021, she was named in Sri Lanka's team for the 2021 Women's Cricket World Cup Qualifier tournament in Zimbabwe. In January 2022, she was named in Sri Lanka's team for the 2022 Commonwealth Games Cricket Qualifier tournament in Malaysia. She was part of the Sri Lankan team for the cricket tournament at the 2022 Commonwealth Games in Birmingham, England. and for the 2024 ICC Women's T20 World Cup.
