= Oshadi Ranasinghe =

Sri Lankan cricketer (born 1986)

Personal information
- Full name: Oshadi Udeshika Ranasinghe
- Born: 16 March 1986 (age 40); Colombo, Sri Lanka
- Batting: Left-handed
- Bowling: Right-arm medium-fast

International information
- National side: Sri Lanka
- ODI debut (cap 51): 24 November 2011 v West Indies
- Last ODI: 4 May 2023 v India
- ODI shirt no.: 86
- T20I debut (cap 28): 1 March 2013 v West Indies
- Last T20I: 12 May 2023 v New Zealand

Career statistics
| Competition | WODI | WT20I |
|---|---|---|
| Matches | 31 | 64 |
| Runs scored | 312 | 367 |
| Batting average | 13.56 | 9.27 |
| 100s/50s | 0/1 | 0/0 |
| Top score | 51* | 34* |
| Balls bowled | 1097 | 1153 |
| Wickets | 30 | 58 |
| Bowling average | 31.33 | 22.79 |
| 5 wickets in innings | 1 | 0 |
| 10 wickets in match | 0 | 0 |
| Best bowling | 5/34 | 3/18 |
| Catches/stumpings | 6/– | 11/– |
Medal record
Representing Sri Lanka
Women's Cricket
Asian Games
| Silver medal – second place | 2022 Hangzhou | Team |
- Source: Cricinfo, 17 May 2023

Oshadi Udeshika Ranasinghe (born 16 March 1986) is a Sri Lankan cricketer.

Ranasinghe is a left-handed batter and a right-arm medium-fast bowler.

She made her ODI debut on 24 November 2011 and her T20I debut on 1 March 2013, both against the West Indies.

In October 2018, she was named in Sri Lanka's squad for the 2018 ICC Women's World Twenty20 tournament in the West Indies. In October 2021, she was named in Sri Lanka's team for the 2021 Women's Cricket World Cup Qualifier tournament in Zimbabwe. In January 2022, she was named in Sri Lanka's team for the 2022 Commonwealth Games Cricket Qualifier tournament in Malaysia. In July 2022, she was part of Sri Lanka's squad announced for the cricket tournament at the 2022 Commonwealth Games in Birmingham, England.
