= Holly Huddleston =

New Zealand cricketer

Personal information
- Full name: Holly Rachael Huddleston
- Born: 11 October 1987 (age 39); Springs, Gauteng South Africa
- Batting: Right-handed
- Bowling: Right-arm medium
- Role: All-rounder

International information
- National side: New Zealand (2014–2020)
- ODI debut (cap 127): 22 February 2014 v West Indies
- Last ODI: 7 October 2020 v Australia
- T20I debut (cap 41): 2 March 2014 v West Indies
- Last T20I: 30 September 2020 v Australia

Domestic team information
- Years: Team
- 2005/06–2008/09: Northern Districts
- 2009/10–2022/23: Auckland
- 2016–2017: Middlesex
- 2017: Western Storm

Career statistics
Competition	WODI	WT20I	WLA	WT20
Matches	36	16	190	132
Runs scored	67	15	1,716	1,036
Batting average	6.09	7.50	18.25	17.86
100s/50s	0/0	0/0	0/4	0/2
Top score	16*	10	64	55*
Balls bowled	1527	238	7,438	2,242
Wickets	46	13	198	96
Bowling average	24.30	18.30	24.85	22.23
5 wickets in innings	3	0	3	0
10 wickets in match	0	0	0	0
Best bowling	5/25	2/9	5/25	4/21
Catches/stumpings	2/–	5/–	35/–	34/–
- Source: CricketArchive, 6 March 2023

Holly Rachael Huddleston (born 11 October 1987) is a New Zealand former cricketer who played as a right-arm medium bowler and right-handed batter. She appeared in 36 One Day Internationals and 16 Twenty20 Internationals for New Zealand between 2014 and 2020. She played domestic cricket for Northern Districts, Auckland, Middlesex and Western Storm.

In April 2018, she won the Phyl Blackler Cup for her domestic bowling at the New Zealand Cricket Awards. In August 2018, she was awarded a central contract by New Zealand Cricket, following the tours of Ireland and England in the previous months. In October 2018, she was named in New Zealand's squad for the 2018 ICC Women's World Twenty20 tournament in the West Indies. In January 2020, she was named in New Zealand's squad for the 2020 ICC Women's T20 World Cup in Australia.

Huddleston retired from all forms of cricket in February 2023.
