= Dilani Manodara =

Sri Lankan cricketer (born 1982)

Personal information
- Full name: Manodara Acharige Don Dilani Surangika
- Born: 8 December 1982 (age 43); Kandy, Sri Lanka
- Batting: Right-handed
- Role: Wicket-keeper

International information
- National side: Sri Lanka
- ODI debut (cap 36): 14 December 2006 v Pakistan
- Last ODI: 7 October 2019 v Australia
- T20I debut (cap 10): 12 June 2009 v Pakistan
- Last T20I: 2 October 2019 v Australia

Career statistics
Competition	WODI	WT20I
Matches	92	62
Runs scored	1363	752
Batting average	18.93	19.78
100s/50s	0/3	0/1
Top score	84	50*
Catches/stumpings	47/24	12/15
Medal record
Representing Sri Lanka
Women's Cricket
Asian Games
Bronze medal – third place	2014 Incheon	Team
- Source: Cricinfo, 19 September 2021

Manodara Acharige Don Dilani Surangika (born 8 December 1982), known as Dilani Manodara, is a Sri Lankan cricketer who has played 139 international matches for her country. She holds the record for effecting the most dismissals (67) as wicket-keeper for Sri Lanka in Women's ODIs. Manodara was a member of the 2014 Asian Games women's cricket bronze medal winning team.

In October 2018, she was named in Sri Lanka's squad for the 2018 ICC Women's World Twenty20 tournament in the West Indies. In January 2020, she was named in Sri Lanka's squad for the 2020 ICC Women's T20 World Cup in Australia.

In an ODI match against the West Indies in April 2010, Manodara was retired out due to her slow scoring rate in her team's innings, having taken 70 minutes and 39 balls to score 8 runs.
