= Hannah Rowe =

New Zealander cricketer (born 1996)

Personal information
- Full name: Hannah Maree Rowe
- Born: 3 October 1996 (age 30); Palmerston North, Manawatu, New Zealand
- Batting: Right-handed
- Bowling: Right-arm medium
- Role: Bowler
- Relatives: Matt Rowe (cousin)

International information
- National side: New Zealand (2015–present)
- ODI debut (cap 132): 26 February 2015 v England
- Last ODI: 29 October 2024 v India
- ODI shirt no.: 74
- T20I debut (cap 47): 13 July 2015 v India
- Last T20I: 24 September 2024 v Australia
- T20I shirt no.: 74

Domestic team information
- Years: Team
- 2011/12–present: Central Districts

Career statistics
Competition	WODI	WT20I
Matches	58	47
Runs scored	352	155
Batting average	12.57	15.50
100s/50s	0/1	0/0
Top score	52	33
Balls bowled	2,252	486
Wickets	61	24
Bowling average	28.62	25.91
5 wickets in innings	1	0
10 wickets in match	0	0
Best bowling	5/55	3/18
Catches/stumpings	18/–	17/–
Medal record
Women's cricket
Representing New Zealand
ICC T20 World Cup
Winner	2024 UAE
Commonwealth Games
Bronze medal – third place	2022 Birmingham
- Source: ESPNcricinfo, 29 October 2024

Hannah Maree Rowe (born 3 October 1996) is a New Zealand cricketer.

== Career ==
Rowe made her debut in international cricket against England women on 26 January 2015. She is right-hand batsman and bowls right-arm medium pace.

In August 2018, she was awarded a central contract by New Zealand Cricket, following the tours of Ireland and England in the previous months. In October 2018, she was named in New Zealand's squad for the 2018 ICC Women's World Twenty20 tournament in the West Indies. In October 2019, she was named in the Women's Global Development Squad, ahead of a five-match series in Australia. In February 2022, she was named in New Zealand's team for the 2022 Women's Cricket World Cup in New Zealand. In June 2022, Rowe was named in New Zealand's team for the cricket tournament at the 2022 Commonwealth Games in Birmingham, England.

In September 2024 she was named in the New Zealand squad for the 2024 ICC Women's T20 World Cup.

Rowe was named in the New Zealand squad for their ODI tour to India in October 2024.
