= Anna Peterson (cricketer) =

New Zealand cricketer

Personal information
- Full name: Anna Michelle Peterson
- Born: 12 September 1990 (age 36); Auckland, New Zealand
- Batting: Right-handed
- Bowling: Right-arm off break
- Role: Bowler

International information
- National side: New Zealand (2012–2020)
- ODI debut (cap 125): 1 March 2012 v England
- Last ODI: 24 February 2019 v Australia
- T20I debut (cap 44): 24 February 2015 v England
- Last T20I: 2 March 2020 v Australia

Domestic team information
- Years: Team
- 2007/08–2013/14: Northern Districts (squad no. 52)
- 2014/15–2021/22: Auckland (squad no. 2)
- 2016: Typhoons

Career statistics
Competition	WODI	WT20I	WLA	WT20
Matches	32	33	137	124
Runs scored	279	92	2,106	1,450
Batting average	16.41	6.13	21.48	15.93
100s/50s	0/0	0/0	1/10	0/4
Top score	46	15	102*	68
Balls bowled	826	372	4,029	1,899
Wickets	27	18	109	96
Bowling average	17.85	23.72	23.66	21.00
5 wickets in innings	0	0	3	0
10 wickets in match	0	0	0	0
Best bowling	4/25	3/2	5/20	4/11
Catches/stumpings	9/–	8/–	42/–	35/–
- Source: CricketArchive, 14 November 2022

Anna Michelle Peterson (born 12 September 1990) is a New Zealand former cricketer who played as an all-rounder, batting right-handed and bowling right-arm off break. She appeared in 32 One Day Internationals and 33 Twenty20 Internationals for New Zealand between 2012 and 2020. She played domestic cricket for Northern Districts, Auckland and Typhoons. She was the first cricketer for New Zealand to take a hat-trick in a Women's Twenty20 International. In October 2021, Peterson retired from international cricket, and in March 2022 she retired from all forms of cricket.

== Career ==
She made her WODI debut on 1 March 2012 against England and scored crucial 33 runs on debut by batting down the order. She made her WT20I debut on 24 February 2015 against England.

On 19 February 2017, she took a hat-trick during the second Women's Twenty20 International match against Australia. She completed her hat-trick by claiming the wickets on first three balls of her spell in the match and her bowling figures were read at 0.3-0-0-3. Her bowling spell of 3/2 against Australia also propelled an unlikely victory for New Zealand in a low scoring affair after bowling out Australia cheaply for just 61 runs and New Zealand successfully defended 101 runs. Anna's hat-trick was also the first hat-trick for a New Zealand women's bowler in international cricket since 1996.

She was named in New Zealand's squad for the 2016 ICC Women's World Twenty20 tournament in India. She was named in New Zealand's squad for the 2017 Women's Cricket World Cup tournament in England.

In October 2018, she was named in New Zealand's squad for the 2018 ICC Women's World Twenty20 tournament in the West Indies. In January 2020, she was named in New Zealand's squad for the 2020 ICC Women's T20 World Cup in Australia.

She also currently works at North Harbour Rugby as the rugby manager for both girls and women.
