= Pakistan women's cricket team in the West Indies in 2015–16 =

International cricket tour

Pakistan women's tour of West Indies
	West Indies women	Pakistan women
- Dates: 16 October 2015 – 1 November 2015
Captains	Stafanie Taylor	Sana Mir

One Day International series
- Results: West Indies women won the 4-match series 3–1
Most runs	Stafanie Taylor (261)	Javeria Khan (192)
Most wickets	Shamilia Connell (6)	Anam Amin (9)
- Player of the series: Stafanie Taylor (WI)

Twenty20 International series
- Results: West Indies women won the 3-match series 3–0
Most runs	Deandra Dottin (65)	Bismah Maroof (60)
Most wickets	Deandra Dottin (6)	Sana Mir (4)
- Player of the series: Deandra Dottin (WI)

Pakistan women's national cricket team toured West Indies in October 2015. The tour included a series of four One Day Internationals (ODIs) and three Twenty20 Internationals (T20Is). Latter 3 of the 4 ODIs were part of the 2014–16 ICC Women's Championship.

== Pakistan women's in the West Indies ==
=== Squads ===
ODIs		T20Is	
West Indies	Pakistan	West Indies	Pakistan
Stafanie Taylor (c); Shakera Selman (vc); Merissa Aguilleira; Shamilia Connell; Britney Cooper; Deandra Dottin; Afy Fletcher; Stacy-Ann King; Kycia Knight; Kyshona Knight; Hayley Matthews; Anisa Mohammed; Tremayne Smartt	Sana Mir (c); Batool Fatima (Vc); Aliya Riaz; Anam Amin; Asmavia Iqbal; Ayesha Zafar; Diana Baig; Iram Javed; Javeria Khan; Marina Iqbal; Nida Dar; Rabiya Shah; Sania Khan; Sidra Ameen; Sumaiya Siddiqi; Kainat Imtiaz^{1}; Nahida Khan^{1}; Sadia Yousuf^{1}; Sidra Nawaz^{1}	Stafanie Taylor (c); Shakera Selman (vc); Merissa Aguilleira; Shamilia Connell; Britney Cooper; Deandra Dottin; Afy Fletcher; Stacy-Ann King; Kycia Knight; Kyshona Knight; Hayley Matthews; Anisa Mohammed; Tremayne Smartt	Sana Mir (c); Batool Fatima (Vc); Aliya Riaz; Anam Amin; Asmavia Iqbal; Ayesha Zafar; Diana Baig; Iram Javed; Javeria Khan; Marina Iqbal; Nida Dar; Rabiya Shah; Sania Khan; Sidra Ameen; Sumaiya Siddiqi; Kainat Imtiaz^{1}; Nahida Khan^{1}; Sadia Yousuf^{1}; Sidra Nawaz^{1}

^{1} Standby Players

=== Tour match ===
==== St Lucia Nat. Cric. Ass. President's Inv. XI vs Pakistani Women's ====
13 October
10:00
Scorecard

St Lucia National Cricket Association President's Invitation XI	v	Pakistani Women's

Beausejour Stadium, Gros Islet, St Lucia

=== ODI Series ===
==== 1st ODI ====
16 October
10:00
Scorecard

West Indies; 222/9 (50 overs)	v	Pakistan; 225/4 (48.1 overs)
Merissa Aguilleira 67* (83); Anam Amin 2/33 (8 overs)		Javeria Khan 90 (131); Deandra Dottin 2/44 (9 overs)

Pakistan Women won by 6 wickets
Beausejour Stadium, Gros Islet, St Lucia
Umpires: Jacqueline Williams (Jam) and Joel Wilson (Tri)
Player of the match: Javeria Khan (Pak)

- Pakistan Women won the toss and elected to field.

==== 2nd ODI ====
ICC Women's Championship
18 October
10:00
Scorecard

Pakistan; 149 (46.1 overs)	v	West Indies; 150/7 (46.5 overs)
Nain Abidi 48 (82); Hayley Matthews 2/22 (7 overs)		Stafanie Taylor 49 (89); Anam Amin 4/27 (10 overs)

West Indies Women won by 3 wickets
Beausejour Stadium, Gros Islet, St Lucia
Umpires: Gregory Brathwaite (Bar) and Joel Wilson (Tri)
Player of the match: Anisa Mohammed (WI)

- West Indies Women won the toss and elected to field.
- ICC Women's Championship points: West Indies Women 2, Pakistan Women 0

==== 3rd ODI ====
ICC Women's Championship
21 October
10:00
Scorecard

West Indies; 281/5 (50 overs)	v	Pakistan; 172/9 (50 overs)
Stafanie Taylor 98* (117); Anam Amin 2/50 (10 overs)		Javeria Khan 73* (127); Stafanie Taylor 3/26 (10 overs)

West Indies Women won by 109 runs
Beausejour Stadium, Gros Islet, St Lucia
Umpires: Gregory Brathwaite (Bar) and Joel Wilson (Tri)
Player of the match: Stafanie Taylor (WI)

- Pakistan Women won the toss and elected to field.
- ICC Women's Championship points: West Indies Women 2, Pakistan Women 0

==== 4th ODI ====
ICC Women's Championship
24 October
10:00
Scorecard

Pakistan; 182/5 (50 overs)	v	West Indies; 183/4 (42.2 overs)
Asmavia Iqbal 44* (43); Shamilia Connell 3/32 (10 overs)		Stafanie Taylor 87* (107); Asmavia Iqbal 1/15 (2 overs)

West Indies Women won by 6 wickets
Beausejour Stadium, Gros Islet, St Lucia
Umpires: Gregory Brathwaite (Bar) and Joel Wilson (Tri)
Player of the match: Stafanie Taylor (WI)

- West Indies Women won the toss and elected to field.
- Ayesha Zafar (Pak) made her ODI debut.
- ICC Women's Championship points: West Indies Women 2, Pakistan Women 0

=== T20I Series ===
==== 1st T20I ====
29 October
14:00
Scorecard

Pakistan; 74/9 (20 overs)	v	West Indies; 78/2 (16.2 overs)
Aliya Riaz 16 (27); Deandra Dottin 2/10 (2 overs)		Deandra Dottin 38* (39); Anam Amin 1/12 (4 overs)

West Indies Women won by 8 wickets
National Cricket Stadium, St. George's, Grenada
Umpires: Peter Nero (Tri) and Jacqueline Williams (Jam)
Player of the match: Deandra Dottin (WI)

- West Indies Women won the toss and elected to field.
- Ayesha Zafar (Pak) made her T20I debut.

==== 2nd T20I ====
31 October
14:00
Scorecard

Pakistan; 95/7 (20 overs)	v	West Indies; 91/3 (17.4 overs)
Nain Abidi 35 (45); Deandra Dottin 3/20 (4 overs)		Stafanie Taylor 48* (43); Nida Dar 2/12 (4 overs)

West Indies Women won by 11 runs (DLS method)
National Cricket Stadium, St. George's, Grenada
Umpires: Nigel Duguid (Guy) and Peter Nero (Tri)
Player of the match: Stafanie Taylor (WI)

- West Indies Women won the toss and elected to field.
- Rain stopped play at the 17.4 over of the West Indies innings, with the score at 91/3. The target was revised and WI were declared winners (Duckworth–Lewis–Stern method).

==== 3rd T20I ====
1 November
14:00
Scorecard

West Indies; 88 (19.5 overs)	v	Pakistan; 77/7 (17 overs)
Kycia Knight 49 (48); Sana Mir 4/14 (3.5 overs)		Bismah Maroof 30 (37); Stacy-Ann King 1/11 (4 overs)

Match tied (DLS method)
National Cricket Stadium, St. George's, Grenada
Umpires: Nigel Duguid (Guy) and Peter Nero (Tri)
Player of the match: Sana Mir (Pak)

- Pakistan Women won the toss and elected to field.
- Rain stopped play at the 3.5 over of the Pakistan innings, with the score at 7/1. When play resumed, Pakistan innings was reduced to 17 overs with a revised target of 78 runs. West Indies won the one-over eliminator.
- Diana Baig (Pak) made her T20I debut.

== Pakistan women in the United States of America ==
Pakistan women's in the USA 2015–16
	United States women	Pakistan women
- Date: 4 November 2015
Captains	Nadia Gruny	Sana Mir

Twenty20 International series
- Results: Pakistan women won the 2-match series 2–0
Most runs	Nadia Gruny (28)	Aliya Riaz (106)
Most wickets	Zeenat Kauser (2)	Sumaiya Siddiqi (4)

Being invited by USACA, Pakistan women played two T20s against hosts USA women.

=== Squads ===
T20Is
United States	Pakistan
Nadia Gruny (c); Erica Rendler (vc); Sindhu Sriharsha; Zeenat Kauser; Uzma Iftikhar; Claudine Beckford; Triholder Marshall; Geetha Shawkarla; Beulah Pidakala; Rohani Patel; Saadia Fazal; Mahika Koduganti; Gita Venkat; Nusrat Khan	Sana Mir (c); Batool Fatima (Vc); Aliya Riaz; Anam Amin; Asmavia Iqbal; Ayesha Zafar; Diana Baig; Iram Javed; Javeria Khan; Marina Iqbal; Nida Dar; Rabiya Shah; Sania Khan; Sidra Ameen; Sumaiya Siddiqi; Kainat Imtiaz^{1}; Nahida Khan^{1}; Sadia Yousuf^{1}; Sidra Nawaz^{1}

^{1} Standby Players

=== T20 Series ===
==== 1st T20 ====
4 November
10:00
Scorecard

Pakistan; 233/4 (20 overs)	v	United States; 49/5 (17 overs)
Aliya Riaz 106* (39); Zeenat Kauser 2/36 (4 overs)		Nadia Gruny 27 (41); Nida Dar 2/2 (3 overs)

Pakistan Women won by 142 runs (DLS method)
Central Broward Regional Park, Lauderhill, Florida

==== 2nd T20 ====
4 November
15:30
Scorecard

United States; 56/8 (20 overs)	v	Pakistan; 57/0 (5 overs)
Erica Rendler 14 (25); Bismah Maroof 2/5 (4 overs)		Nain Abidi 27* (12); Gita Venkat 0/7 (1 over)

Pakistan Women won by 10 wickets
Central Broward Regional Park, Lauderhill, Florida

- United States won the toss and elected to bat.
