= Pakistan women's cricket team in the West Indies in 2021 =

International cricket tour

	West Indies women	Pakistan women
- Dates: 30 June – 18 July 2021
Captains	Stafanie Taylor (Note: Anisa Mohammed captained the West Indies for the third WODI.)	Javeria Khan

One Day International series
- Results: West Indies women won the 5-match series 3–2
Most runs	Kyshona Knight (181)	Omaima Sohail (191)
Most wickets	Anisa Mohammed (12)	Fatima Sana (11)
- Player of the series: Hayley Matthews (WI)

Twenty20 International series
- Results: West Indies women won the 3-match series 3–0
Most runs	Kycia Knight (69)	Nida Dar (55)
Most wickets	Shamilia Connell (5)	Nida Dar (4); Fatima Sana (4); Diana Baig (4)
- Player of the series: Shamilia Connell (WI)

The Pakistan women's cricket team toured the West Indies to play the West Indies women's cricket team in June and July 2021. The tour consisted of three Women's Twenty20 International (WT20I) and five Women's One Day International (WODI) matches.

The respective A teams also played three 20-over and three limited overs matches against each other, with the WT20I and 20-over matches played as double-headers. It was the first ever bilateral A team series by the two teams. The 50-over matches were used as preparation for the 2021 Women's Cricket World Cup Qualifier held in Zimbabwe in November and December 2021.

In the opening match of the series, Nida Dar two wickets for 15 runs made her the first bowler, male of female, to take 100 wickets in T20I cricket for Pakistan.

On 2 July 2021, during the second WT20I match, West Indies players Chinelle Henry and Chedean Nation collapsed on the field within ten minutes of each other, at the Coolidge Cricket Ground in Antigua. Both were immediately taken to hospital, where they were reported to be conscious and stable. However, the match continued, with both players replaced by substitutes. Both of them recovered and joined the West Indies' squad ahead of the third WT20I.

Pakistan's A Team won the first two 20-over fixtures, to win the series with a match to spare. The West Indies won the first two WT20I matches, to also win the series with a game to spare. The Pakistan A Team won the third 20-over match by eight wickets, to win the series 3–0. The West Indies won the third WT20I match by six wickets, to win the series 3–0. The West Indies won the first three WODI matches, to win the series with two games to spare. Pakistan A continued their winning streak, with victory in the first two 50-over matches, taking an unassailable series lead. Pakistan A won their final match by seven wickets to remain unbeaten across all six of their matches. Pakistan beat the West Indies by 22 runs in the rain-affected final match of the tour, with the West Indies winning the WODI series 3–2.

== Squads ==
West Indies		Pakistan
WODIs	WT20Is	WODIs and WT20Is
Stafanie Taylor (c); Anisa Mohammed (vc); Aaliyah Alleyne; Shamilia Connell; Britney Cooper; Deandra Dottin; Shabika Gajnabi; Chinelle Henry; Caneisha Isaac; Kycia Knight; Kyshona Knight; Hayley Matthews; Chedean Nation; Karishma Ramharack; Shakera Selman; Rashada Williams; Reniece Boyce (c, One-Day A Team); Shabika Gajnabi (vc); Shanika Bruce; Cherry-Ann Fraser; Jannillea Glasgow; Sheneta Grimmond; Zaida James; Japhina Joseph; Qiana Joseph; Mandy Mangru; Kaysia Schultz; Steffi Soogrim; Rachel Vincent; Rashada Williams	Stafanie Taylor (c); Anisa Mohammed (vc); Aaliyah Alleyne; Shamilia Connell; Britney Cooper; Deandra Dottin; Chinelle Henry; Kycia Knight; Kyshona Knight; Hayley Matthews; Chedean Nation; Karishma Ramharack; Shakera Selman; Reniece Boyce (c, T20 A Team); Shabika Gajnabi (vc); Shanika Bruce; Cherry-Ann Fraser; Jannillea Glasgow; Sheneta Grimmond; Caneisha Isaac; Zaida James; Japhina Joseph; Qiana Joseph; Mandy Mangru; Kaysia Schultz; Steffi Soogrim; Rachel Vincent; Rashada Williams	Javeria Khan (c); Rameen Shamim (c, One-Day A Team); Sidra Nawaz (c, T20 A Team); Muneeba Ali (wk); Najiha Alvi (wk); Sidra Ameen; Anam Amin; Aiman Anwer; Diana Baig; Nida Dar; Kaynat Hafeez; Kainat Imtiaz; Sadia Iqbal; Iram Javed; Nahida Khan; Ayesha Naseem; Saba Nazir; Natalia Pervaiz; Javeria Rauf; Aliya Riaz; Fatima Sana; Syeda Aroob Shah; Omaima Sohail; Nashra Sandhu; Maham Tariq; Ayesha Zafar

Pakistan did not name individual squads for the WODI and WT20I matches, opting instead to name a combined squad of 26 players for the tour. Conversely, the West Indies named squads for both the national and A teams. Stafanie Taylor was named as their captain, with Reniece Boyce leading the A Team for both the 20-over and 50-over matches. On 12 July 2021, Cricket West Indies added Shabika Gajnabi, Chinelle Henry and Rashada Williams to their WODI squad for the final three matches. Rameen Shamim was ruled out of Pakistan's squad for the fourth WODI match due to an injury.

== WT20I series ==
=== 1st WT20I ===
30 June 2021
14:00
Scorecard

West Indies; 136/6 (20 overs)	v	Pakistan; 126/6 (20 overs)
Hayley Matthews 32 (28); Nida Dar 2/15 (4 overs)		Ayesha Naseem 45* (33); Shamilia Connell 3/21 (4 overs)

West Indies Women won by 10 runs
Sir Vivian Richards Stadium, Antigua
Umpires: Jonathan Blades (WI) and Danesh Ramdhanie (WI)
Player of the match: Shamilia Connell (WI)

- Pakistan Women won the toss and elected to field.
- Nida Dar (Pak) took her 100th wicket in WT20Is.

=== 2nd WT20I ===
2 July 2021
14:00
Scorecard

West Indies; 125/6 (20 overs)	v	Pakistan; 103/6 (18 overs)
Kycia Knight 30* (20); Fatima Sana 2/18 (4 overs)		Nida Dar 29 (36); Hayley Matthews 1/13 (4 overs)

West Indies Women by 7 runs (DLS method)
Coolidge Cricket Ground, Antigua
Umpires: Christopher Taylor (WI) and Chris Wright (WI)
Player of the match: Kycia Knight (WI)

- West Indies Women won the toss and elected to bat.
- Pakistan Women were set a revised target of 110 runs from 18 overs due to rain.

=== 3rd WT20I ===
4 July 2021
14:00
Scorecard

Pakistan; 102 (19.4 overs)	v	West Indies; 106/4 (19.1 overs)
Muneeba Ali 18 (15); Stafanie Taylor 4/17 (3.4 overs)		Stafanie Taylor 43* (41); Diana Baig 2/17 (4 overs)

West Indies Women won by 6 wickets
Sir Vivian Richards Stadium, Antigua
Umpires: Jonathan Blades (WI) and Verdayne Smith (WI)
Player of the match: Stafanie Taylor (WI)

- Pakistan Women won the toss and elected to bat.
- Stafanie Taylor became the second bowler for the West Indies to take a hat-trick in WT20Is.

== WODI series ==
=== 1st WODI ===
7 July 2021
09:30
Scorecard

Pakistan; 205/9 (50 overs)	v	West Indies; 209/5 (47.5 overs)
Nida Dar 55 (71); Stafanie Taylor 3/29 (10 overs)		Stafanie Taylor 105* (116); Sadia Iqbal 2/47 (10 overs)

West Indies Women won by 5 wickets
Coolidge Cricket Ground, Antigua
Umpires: Verdayne Smith (WI) and Chris Wright (WI)
Player of the match: Stafanie Taylor (WI)

- West Indies Women won the toss and elected to field.
- Caneisha Isaac (WI) made her WODI debut.

=== 2nd WODI ===
9 July 2021
09:30
Scorecard

Pakistan; 120 (42.4 overs)	v	West Indies; 121/2 (31.1 overs)
Muneeba Ali 37 (63); Anisa Mohammed 4/27 (9.4 overs)		Hayley Matthews 49 (58)

West Indies Women won by 8 wickets
Coolidge Cricket Ground, Antigua
Umpires: Danesh Ramdhanie (WI) and Christopher Taylor (WI)
Player of the match: Hayley Matthews (WI)

- Pakistan Women won the toss and elected to bat.

=== 3rd WODI ===
12 July 2021
09:30
Scorecard

Pakistan; 182 (49 overs)	v	West Indies; 183/2 (40.1 overs)
Omaima Sohail 62 (79); Anisa Mohammed 3/25 (10 overs)		Hayley Matthews 100* (122); Anam Amin 1/35 (10 overs)

West Indies Women won by 8 wickets
Sir Vivian Richards Stadium, Antigua
Umpires: Jonathan Blades (WI) and Christopher Taylor (WI)
Player of the match: Hayley Matthews (WI)

- West Indies Women won the toss and elected to field.
- Ayesha Naseem (Pak) made her WODI debut.

=== 4th WODI ===
15 July 2021
09:30
Scorecard

West Indies; 210 (49.4 overs)	v	Pakistan; 214/6 (48.3 overs)
Kyshona Knight 88 (140); Fatima Sana 4/30 (8 overs)		Omaima Sohail 61 (89); Shakera Selman 2/37 (9.3 overs)

Pakistan Women won by 4 wickets
Sir Vivian Richards Stadium, Antigua
Umpires: Danesh Ramdhanie (WI) and Verdayne Smith (WI)
Player of the match: Fatima Sana (Pak)

- Pakistan Women won the toss and elected to field.
- Rashada Williams (WI) made her WODI debut.

=== 5th WODI ===
18 July 2021
09:30
Scorecard

Pakistan; 190/8 (34 overs)	v	West Indies; 171 (34 overs)
Muneeba Ali 39 (59); Shabika Gajnabi 2/26 (6 overs)		Britney Cooper 40 (53); Fatima Sana 5/39 (7 overs)

Pakistan Women won by 22 runs (DLS method)
Sir Vivian Richards Stadium, Antigua
Umpires: Jonathan Blades (WI) and Verdayne Smith (WI)
Player of the match: Fatima Sana (Pak)

- West Indies Women won the toss and elected to field.
- West Indies Women were set a revised target of 194 runs from 34 overs due to rain.
- Fatima Sana (Pak) took her first five-wicket haul in WODIs.

== A Team 20-over series ==
=== 1st 20-over match ===
30 June 2021
09:00
Scorecard

West Indies A 96/8 (20 overs)	v	Pakistan A 98/3 (18.5 overs)
Rashada Williams 33 (41); Rameen Shamim 2/8 (3 overs)		Ayesha Zafar 40* (45); Mandy Mangru 1/9 (2 overs)

Pakistan A Women won by 7 wickets
Sir Vivian Richards Stadium, Antigua
Umpires: Verdayne Smith (WI) and Christopher Taylor (WI)

- Pakistan A Women won the toss and elected to field.

=== 2nd 20-over match ===
2 July 2021
09:00
Scorecard

Pakistan A 108/5 (20 overs)	v	West Indies A 94 (19.4 overs)
Muneeba Ali 27 (16); Steffi Soogrim 1/9 (4 overs)		Rashada Williams 21 (37); Kainat Imtiaz 3/18 (3 overs)

Pakistan A Women won by 14 runs
Coolidge Cricket Ground, Antigua
Umpires: Jonathan Blades (WI) and Danesh Ramdhanie (WI)

- West Indies A Women won the toss and elected to field.

=== 3rd 20-over match ===
4 July 2021
09:00
Scorecard

West Indies A 99/6 (20 overs)	v	Pakistan A 100/2 (18.4 overs)
Reniece Boyce 42 (44); Syeda Aroob Shah 2/13 (3 overs)		Ayesha Zafar 53* (57); Shabika Gajnabi 1/18 (3 overs)

Pakistan A Women won by 8 wickets
Sir Vivian Richards Stadium, Antigua
Umpires: Bernard Joseph (WI) and Chris Wright (WI)

- Pakistan A Women won the toss and elected to field.

== A Team 50-over series ==
=== 1st 50-over match ===
10 July 2021
09:30
Scorecard

West Indies A 179/8 (50 overs)	v	Pakistan A 181/1 (34 overs)
Rashada Williams 70 (112); Anam Amin 2/28 (9 overs)		Javeria Rauf 86* (100); Shabika Gajnabi 1/20 (4 overs)

Pakistan A Women won by 9 wickets
Sir Vivian Richards Stadium, Antigua
Umpires: Bernard Joseph (WI) and Chris Wright (WI)

- Pakistan A Women won the toss and elected to field.

=== 2nd 50-over match ===
13 July 2021
09:30
Scorecard

Pakistan A 269/5 (50 overs)	v	West Indies A 189/4 (50 overs)
Sidra Ameen 108* (143); Cherry-Ann Fraser 2/53 (9 overs)		Rachel Vincent 56 (109); Kainat Imtiaz 1/24 (6 overs)

Pakistan A Women won by 80 runs
Coolidge Cricket Ground, Antigua
Umpires: Danesh Ramdhanie (WI) and Chris Wright (WI)

- Pakistan A Women won the toss and elected to bat.

=== 3rd 50-over match ===
16 July 2021
09:30
Scorecard

West Indies A 204 (47.5 overs)	v	Pakistan A 205/3 (42.2 overs)
Qiana Joseph 48 (56); Aiman Anwer 3/22 (10 overs)		Aliya Riaz 63* (77); Sheneta Grimmond 2/24 (7 overs)

Pakistan A Women won by 7 wickets
Coolidge Cricket Ground, Antigua
Umpires: Jonathan Blades (WI) and Christopher Taylor (WI)

- Pakistan A Women won the toss and elected to field.
