= Women's Cricket Challenge Trophy =

Pakistan women's Twenty20 cricket competition

- Countries: Pakistan
- Administrator: Pakistan Cricket Board (PCB)
- Format: Twenty20
- First edition: 2011–12
- Latest edition: 2016–17
- Tournament format: Round-robin and final
- Number of teams: 4
- Current champion: Zarai Taraqiati Bank Limited (5th title)
- Most successful: Zarai Taraqiati Bank Limited (5 titles)

The Women's Cricket Challenge Trophy, officially the Shaheed Mohtarma Benazir Bhutto Women's Cricket Challenge Trophy, was a women's domestic Twenty20 competition that took place in Pakistan from 2011–12 to 2016–17. The tournament included both provincial and departmental teams, and took place alongside the National Women's Cricket Championship.

Zarai Taraqiati Bank Limited were the most successful side in the history of the competition, winning four titles outright and sharing one title with Omar Associates.

== History ==
The Shaheed Mohtarma Benazir Bhutto Women's Cricket Challenge Trophy began in the 2011–12 season, named after former Pakistan Prime Minister Benazir Bhutto. The tournament took place across three days in January 2012, in Lahore, with six teams competing in two groups of three. Zarai Taraqiati Bank Limited (ZTBL) won the tournament, beating Punjab in the final by 93 runs. The following season, 2012–13, saw the same two teams reach the final, with ZTBL again emerging victorious.

The following edition, in 2014, saw just four teams competing in a round-robin group: ZTBL, Higher Education Commission, Omar Associates and Saif Sports Saga. ZTBL and Omar Associates reached the final, which was rained off after 11.2 overs. The title was therefore shared between the two sides.

In 2015–16, the teams were joined by State Bank of Pakistan, who subsequently reached the final. There, they were beaten by ZTBL by 70 runs. In the final season of the tournament, 2016–17, four teams competed: ZTBL, State Bank of Pakistan, Higher Education Commission and a PCB XI. State Bank of Pakistan and ZTBL again reached the final, and ZTBL again emerged victorious, winning their fifth title. In 2018, the tournament was replaced by the Departmental T20 Women's Championship.

== Teams ==
Team	First	Last	Titles
Balochistan	2011–12	2012–13	0
Federal Capital	2011–12	2012–13	0
Higher Education Commission	2014	2015–16	0
Khyber Pakhtunkhwa	2011–12	2012–13	0
Omar Associates	2014	2015–16	1
PCB XI	2016–17	2016–17	0
Punjab	2011–12	2012–13	0
Saif Sports Saga	2014	2015–16	0
Sindh	2011–12	2012–13	0
State Bank of Pakistan	2015–16	2016–17	0
Zarai Taraqiati Bank Limited	2011–12	2016–17	5

Note: The Omar Associates and Zarai Taraqiati Bank Limited totals include one shared title.

== Results ==
Season	Winners	Runners-up	Leading run-scorer	Leading wicket-taker	Refs
2011–12	Zarai Taraqiati Bank Limited	Punjab	Marrium Hasan (Federal Capital) 115	5 bowlers (Note: Sana Mir (ZTBL), Hina Shafiq (Federal Capital), Saima Maqsood (Federal Capital), Nida Dar (ZTBL) and Almas Akram (Balochistan) all took 4 wickets.)	
2012–13	Zarai Taraqiati Bank Limited	Punjab	Bismah Maroof (ZTBL) 99	Nida Dar (ZTBL) 9	
2014	Shared between Zarai Taraqiati Bank Limited and Omar Associates		Marina Iqbal (ZTBL) 87	Aimen Anwar (Saif Sports Saga) 5	
2015–16	Zarai Taraqiati Bank Limited	State Bank of Pakistan	Bismah Maroof (ZTBL) 159	Asmavia Iqbal (Omar Associates) 8	
2016–17	Zarai Taraqiati Bank Limited	State Bank of Pakistan	Iram Javed (State Bank of Pakistan) 173	5 bowlers (Note: Sumaiya Siddiqi (State Bank of Pakistan), Rameen Shamim (PCB XI), Kainat Imtiaz (State Bank of Pakistan), Nida Dar (ZTBL) and Asmavia Iqbal (State Bank of Pakistan) all took 4 wickets.)	

== See also ==
- Departmental T20 Women's Championship
- PCB Triangular Twenty20 Women's Tournament
