= Pakistan women's cricket team in South Africa in 2019 =

International cricket tour

	South Africa women	Pakistan women
- Dates: 1 – 23 May 2019
Captains	Suné Luus	Bismah Maroof

One Day International series
- Results: 3-match series drawn 1–1
Most runs	Laura Wolvaardt (134)	Javeria Khan (128)
Most wickets	Masabata Klaas (6)	Sana Mir (6)
- Player of the series: Laura Wolvaardt (SA)

Twenty20 International series
- Results: South Africa women won the 5-match series 3–2
Most runs	Lizelle Lee (193)	Nida Dar (192)
Most wickets	Shabnim Ismail (5); Moseline Daniels (5)	Nida Dar (5)
- Player of the series: Nida Dar (Pak)

The Pakistan women's cricket team toured South Africa to play against the South Africa women's cricket team in May 2019. The tour consisted of three Women's One Day Internationals (WODIs), which formed part of the 2017–20 ICC Women's Championship, and five Women's Twenty20 International (WT20I) matches.

Dane van Niekerk, South Africa's regular captain, was unavailable for the tour due to injury, with Suné Luus leading the side in her absence. The WODI series was drawn 1–1, after the third and final match finished as a tie. Only six WODI matches have finished in a tie, with this being the first one involving Pakistan, and the third one to feature South Africa. South Africa won the WT20I series 3–2.

== Squads ==
WODIs		WT20Is	
South Africa	Pakistan	South Africa	Pakistan
Suné Luus (c); Chloe Tryon (vc); Shabnim Ismail; Sinalo Jafta (wk); Marizanne Kapp; Masabata Klaas; Nadine de Klerk; Lizelle Lee (wk); Zintle Mali; Mignon du Preez; Tumi Sekhukhune; Nondumiso Shangase; Andrie Steyn; Laura Wolvaardt	Bismah Maroof (c); Sidra Ameen; Aiman Anwer; ~~Diana Baig~~; Nida Dar; Kainat Imtiaz; Javeria Khan; Nahida Khan; Sana Mir; Sidra Nawaz (wk); Javeria Rauf; Aliya Riaz; Fatima Sana; Nashra Sandhu; Rameen Shamim; Omaima Sohail	Suné Luus (c); Chloe Tryon (vc); Tazmin Brits; Moseline Daniels; Shabnim Ismail; Sinalo Jafta (wk); Marizanne Kapp; Masabata Klaas; Nadine de Klerk; Lizelle Lee (wk); Mignon du Preez; Tumi Sekhukhune; Nondumiso Shangase; Laura Wolvaardt	Bismah Maroof (c); Sidra Ameen; Aiman Anwer; ~~Diana Baig~~; Nida Dar; Kainat Imtiaz; Iram Javed; Javeria Khan; Sana Mir; Sidra Nawaz (wk); Javeria Rauf; Aliya Riaz; Fatima Sana; Nashra Sandhu; Rameen Shamim; Omaima Sohail

Ahead of the tour, Diana Baig was ruled out of Pakistan's squad with a thumb injury. She was replaced by Fatima Sana.

== Tour matches ==
=== 50-over match: North West Under-17s v Pakistan Women ===
1 May 2019
10:00
Scorecard

Pakistan; 232/8 (50 overs)	v	North West Under-17s; 96 (27.3 overs)
Aliya Riaz 50 (68); Rameen Shamim 2/34 (10 overs)		Waldo Kemp 25 (33); Nashra Sandhu 3/7 (4.3 overs)

Pakistan Women won by 136 runs
North-West University No1 Ground, Potchefstroom
Umpires: Kobus Conradie (SA) and Roderick Ellis (SA)

- Pakistan Women won the toss and elected to bat.

=== 50-over match: North West Under-17s v Pakistan Women ===
3 May 2019
10:00
Scorecard

North West Under-17s; 191 (38.2 overs)	v	Pakistan; 192/4 (34.2 overs)
Mohamed Sidat 81 (60); Fatima Sana 4/60 (8 overs)		Omaima Sohail 53* (69); Tebogo Mathe 2/42 (10 overs)

Pakistan Women won by 6 wickets
Witrand Cricket Field, Potchefstroom
Umpires: Kobus Conradie (SA) and Roderick Ellis (SA)

- North West Under-17s won the toss and elected to bat.

== WODI series ==
=== 1st WODI ===
ICC Women's Championship
6 May 2019
10:00
Scorecard

South Africa; 63 (22.5 overs)	v	Pakistan; 66/2 (14.4 overs)
Chloe Tryon 21 (32); Sana Mir 4/11 (6 overs)		Javeria Khan 34* (43); Shabnim Ismail 1/18 (5 overs)

Pakistan Women won by 8 wickets
Senwes Park, Potchefstroom
Umpires: Bongani Jele (SA) and Allahudien Paleker (SA)
Player of the match: Sana Mir (Pak)

- Pakistan Women won the toss and elected to field.
- Fatima Sana (Pak) made her WODI debut.
- Marizanne Kapp (SA) played in her 100th WODI.
- South Africa Women made their second-lowest total in WODIs.
- This was Pakistan Women's first win in South Africa and their biggest winning margin, in terms of balls remaining (212), in WODIs.
- Points: Pakistan Women 2, South Africa Women 0.

=== 2nd WODI ===
ICC Women's Championship
9 May 2019
10:00
Scorecard

Pakistan; 147 (42 overs)	v	South Africa; 148/2 (36.4 overs)
Nahida Khan 37 (34); Masabata Klaas 3/27 (9 overs)		Laura Wolvaardt 74* (104); Omaima Sohail 1/24 (5 overs)

South Africa Women won by 8 wickets
Senwes Park, Potchefstroom
Umpires: Arno Jacobs (SA) and Bongani Jele (SA)
Player of the match: Masabata Klaas (SA)

- South Africa Women won the toss and elected to field.
- Masabata Klaas (SA) became the tenth bowler to take a hat-trick in WODIs.
- Points: South Africa Women 2, Pakistan Women 0.

=== 3rd WODI ===
ICC Women's Championship
12 May 2019
10:00
Scorecard

South Africa; 265/6 (50 overs)	v	Pakistan; 265/9 (50 overs)
Suné Luus 80 (84); Aliya Riaz 2/49 (10 overs)		Javeria Khan 74 (103); Masabata Klaas 3/55 (10 overs)

Match tied
Willowmoore Park, Benoni
Umpires: Arno Jacobs (SA) and Allahudien Paleker (SA)
Player of the match: Aliya Riaz (Pak)

- Pakistan Women won the toss and elected to field.
- Sana Mir (Pak) took her 147th wicket to become the most successful spin bowler in WODIs.
- Points: South Africa Women 1, Pakistan Women 1.

== WT20I series ==
=== 1st WT20I ===
15 May 2019
13:00
Scorecard

South Africa; 119/7 (20 overs)	v	Pakistan; 120/3 (18 overs)
Chloe Tryon 43 (31); Sana Mir 3/14 (4 overs)		Nida Dar 53 (37); Masabata Klaas 1/16 (3 overs)

Pakistan Women won by 7 wickets
Tuks Oval, Pretoria
Umpires: Lauren Agenbag (SA) and Adrian Holdstock (SA)
Player of the match: Nida Dar (Pak)

- Pakistan Women won the toss and elected to field.
- Sinalo Jafta (SA) and Fatima Sana (Pak) both made their WT20I debuts.

=== 2nd WT20I ===
18 May 2019
13:00
Scorecard

Pakistan; 128/5 (20 overs)	v	South Africa; 129/2 (19.5 overs)
Bismah Maroof 63* (47); Suné Luus 2/29 (4 overs)		Marizanne Kapp 56* (51); Sana Mir 1/20 (4 overs)

South Africa Women won by 8 wickets
Pietermaritzburg Oval, Pietermaritzburg
Umpires: Adrian Holdstock (SA) and Bongani Jele (SA)
Player of the match: Lizelle Lee (SA)

- Pakistan Women won the toss and elected to bat.
- Rameen Shamim (Pak) made her WT20I debut.

=== 3rd WT20I ===
19 May 2019
13:00
Scorecard

South Africa; 138/3 (20 overs)	v	Pakistan; 139/6 (19.4 overs)
Tazmin Brits 70* (61); Rameen Shamim 1/20 (4 overs)		Iram Javed 53 (42); Moseline Daniels 3/13 (4 overs)

Pakistan Women won by 4 wickets
Pietermaritzburg Oval, Pietermaritzburg
Umpires: Lauren Agenbag (SA) and Bongani Jele (SA)
Player of the match: Iram Javed (Pak)

- Pakistan Women won the toss and elected to field.
- Nondumiso Shangase (SA) made her WT20I debut.

=== 4th WT20I ===
22 May 2019
13:00
Scorecard

Pakistan; 172/5 (20 overs)	v	South Africa; 174/6 (19.1 overs)
Nida Dar 75 (37); Shabnim Ismail 2/22 (4 overs)		Lizelle Lee 60 (31); Fatima Sana 3/27 (3 overs)

South Africa Women won by 4 wickets
Willowmoore Park, Benoni
Umpires: Lauren Agenbag (SA) and Adrian Holdstock (SA)
Player of the match: Lizelle Lee (SA)

- South Africa Women won the toss and elected to field.

=== 5th WT20I ===
23 May 2019
13:00
Scorecard

Pakistan; 125/5 (20 overs)	v	South Africa; 127/1 (15.1 overs)
Nida Dar 28 (17); Nadine de Klerk 1/10 (1 over)		Lizelle Lee 75* (48); Nida Dar 1/17 (3 overs)

South Africa Women won by 9 wickets
Willowmoore Park, Benoni
Umpires: Bongani Jele (SA) and Lauren Agenbag
Player of the match: Lizelle Lee (SA)

- South Africa Women won the toss and elected to field.
