= Pakistan women's cricket team in England and Ireland in 2013 =

Sporting tour

Pakistani women's cricket team in England in 2013
	England	Pakistan
- Dates: 27 June – 5 July 2013
Captains	Charlotte Edwards	Sana Mir

One Day International series
- Results: England won the 2-match series 2–0
Most runs	Charlotte Edwards (145)	Bismah Maroof (77)
Most wickets	Jenny Gunn (5)	Sadia Yousuf (3); Nida Dar (3)

Twenty20 International series
- Results: 2-match series drawn 1–1
Most runs	Sarah Taylor (57)	Nain Abidi (46)
Most wickets	Danni Wyatt (5)	Sadia Yousuf (4); Bismah Maroof (4)

Pakistani women's cricket team against Ireland in England in 2013
	Ireland	Pakistan
- Dates: 8 – 10 July 2013
Captains	Isobel Joyce	Sana Mir

One Day International series
- Results: Pakistan won the 1-match series 1–0
Most runs	Kim Garth (25)	Javeria Khan (51)
Most wickets	Lucy O'Reilly (1); Kim Garth (1)	Nida Dar (3); Nida Dar (3)

Twenty20 International series
- Results: Pakistan won the 2-match series 2–0
Most runs	Clare Shillington (85)	Javeria Khan (77)
Most wickets	Eimear Richardson (5); Kim Garth (2)	Nida Dar (4)

The Pakistan women's national cricket team toured England and Ireland in June and July 2013. In England, they played England in 2 One Day Internationals and 2 Twenty20 Internationals, then played Ireland in 2 T20Is and 1 ODI. They then went to Ireland, and again played Ireland, this time in 1 T20I and 2 ODIs, after which they played in the 2013 ICC Women's World Twenty20 Qualifier. England won the ODI series 2–0, whilst the two sides drew their T20I series 1–1. Pakistan won every match across their series against Ireland.

== Tour of England ==
=== Squads ===
England	Pakistan
Charlotte Edwards (c); Arran Brindle; Georgia Elwiss (withdrawn); Tash Farrant; Lydia Greenway; Jenny Gunn; Danielle Hazell; Amy Jones; Heather Knight; Beth Langston; Susie Rowe; Nat Sciver; Anya Shrubsole; Sarah Taylor (wk); Lauren Winfield; Danni Wyatt	Sana Mir (c); Nain Abidi; Nida Dar; Batool Fatima (wk); Asmavia Iqbal; Qanita Jalil; Iram Javed; Javeria Khan; Nahida Khan; Bismah Maroof; Javeria Rauf; Rabiya Shah; Sumaiya Siddiqi; Sadia Yousuf

=== Tour Matches ===
==== 20-over match: England Academy v Pakistan ====
27 June 2013
Scorecard

Pakistan; 100/8 (20 overs)	v	England Academy; 104/1 (19 overs)
Nahida Khan 20 (22); Cordelia Griffith 2/12 (3 overs)		Tammy Beaumont 50* (58); Sumaiya Siddiqi 1/7 (3 overs)

England Academy Women won by 9 wickets
Haslegrave Ground, Loughborough
Umpires: Mark Gumbley (Eng) and Niven Roper (Eng)

- England Academy Women won the toss and elected to field.

==== 20-over match: England Academy v Pakistan ====
27 June 2013
Scorecard

Pakistan; 85/4 (15 overs)	v	England Academy
Nain Abidi 34* (36); Cordelia Griffith 2/16 (3 overs)

No result
Haslegrave Ground, Loughborough
Umpires: Mark Gumbley (Eng) and Niven Roper (Eng)

- Pakistan Women won the toss and elected to bat.
- No further play possible due to rain.

==== 50-over match: England Academy v Pakistan ====
29 June 2013
Scorecard

England Academy; 174/7 (50 overs)	v	Pakistan; 176/8 (46.3 overs)
Fran Wilson 55 (77); Sadia Yousuf 4/26 (10 overs)		Nain Abidi 65* (104); Sonia Odedra 2/29 (9 overs)

Pakistan Women won by 2 wickets
Haslegrave Ground, Loughborough
Umpires: Harry Fidler (Eng) and Matti Watton (Eng)

- England Academy Women won the toss and elected to bat.

=== WODI Series: England v Pakistan ===
==== 1st ODI ====
1 July 2013
Scorecard

England; 227/7 (50 overs)	v	Pakistan; 116 (41.2 overs)
Charlotte Edwards 83 (124); Sadia Yousuf 3/33 (10 overs)		Javeria Khan 39 (95); Jenny Gunn 5/22 (10 overs)

England Women won by 111 runs
Louth Cricket Club, Louth
Umpires: Steve Garratt (Eng) and Martin Bodenham (Eng)
Player of the match: Jenny Gunn (Eng)

- England Women won the toss and elected to bat.
- Nat Sciver and Lauren Winfield (Eng) both made their WODI debuts.

==== 2nd ODI ====
3 July 2013
Scorecard

Pakistan; 156/6 (50 overs)	v	England; 157/4 (38 overs)
Bismah Maroof 57* (101); Nat Sciver 3/28 (9 overs)		Charlotte Edwards 62 (71); Nida Dar 2/39 (9 overs)

England Women won by 6 wickets
Haslegrave Ground, Loughborough
Umpires: Rob Bailey (Eng) and Steve O'Shaughnessy (Eng)
Player of the match: Nat Sciver (Eng)

- Pakistan Women won the toss and elected to bat.

=== WT20I Series: England v Pakistan ===
==== 1st T20I ====
5 July 2013
Scorecard

England; 145/7 (20 overs)	v	Pakistan; 75/6 (20 overs)
Sarah Taylor 57 (50); Bismah Maroof 2/23 (4 overs)		Nahida Khan 28* (48); Danni Wyatt 3/16 (4 overs)

England Women won by 70 runs
Haslegrave Ground, Loughborough
Umpires: Alex Wharf (Eng) and Richard Illingworth (Eng)
Player of the match: Sarah Taylor (Eng)

- England Women won the toss and elected to bat.
- Tash Farrant, Amy Jones, Nat Sciver and Lauren Winfield (Eng) all made their WT20I debuts.

==== 2nd T20I ====
5 July 2013
Scorecard

Pakistan; 116/8 (20 overs)	v	England; 115 (20 overs)
Nain Abidi 45 (41); Danielle Hazell 2/17 (4 overs)		Arran Brindle 39 (27); Sadia Yousuf 3/22 (4 overs)

Pakistan Women won by 1 run
Haslegrave Ground, Loughborough
Umpires: Alex Wharf (Eng) and Richard Illingworth (Eng)
Player of the match: Sana Mir (Pak)

- Pakistan Women won the toss and elected to bat.

=== WT20I Series: Ireland v Pakistan ===
==== 1st T20I ====
8 July 2013
Scorecard

Ireland; 116/8 (20 overs)	v	Pakistan; 117/6 (18.5 overs)
Clare Shillington 43 (36); Nida Dar 3/13 (4 overs)		Nida Dar 39* (24); Eimear Richardson 2/18 (3 overs)

Pakistan Women won by 4 wickets
Scorers, Shirley
Umpires: Russell Warren (Eng) and Tom Lungley (Eng)

- Ireland Women won the toss and elected to bat.

==== 2nd T20I ====
8 July 2013
Scorecard

Ireland; 119/6 (20 overs)	v	Pakistan; 123/0 (18.2 overs)
Clare Shillington 42 (30); Javeria Rauf 2/23 (4 overs)		Javeria Khan 56* (63)

Pakistan Women won by 10 wickets
Scorers, Shirley
Umpires: Russell Warren (Eng) and Tom Lungley (Eng)

- Ireland Women won the toss and elected to bat.
- Lucy O'Reilly (Ire) and Iram Javed (Pak) both made their WT20I debuts.

=== Only ODI: Ireland v Pakistan ===
10 July 2013
Scorecard

Ireland; 94 (40.2 overs)	v	Pakistan; 97/2 (20 overs)
Kim Garth 25 (60); Nida Dar 3/18 (10 overs)		Javeria Khan 51* (61); Lucy O'Reilly 1/18 (3 overs)

Pakistan Women won by 8 wickets
Scorers, Shirley
Umpires: Russell Warren (Eng) and Tom Lungley (Eng)

- Pakistan Women won the toss and elected to field.
- Lucy O'Reilly (Ire), Iram Javed and Javeria Rauf (Pak) all made their WODI debuts.

== Tour of Ireland ==
Pakistani women's cricket team in Ireland in 2013
	Ireland	Pakistan
- Dates: 15 – 19 July 2013
Captains	Isobel Joyce	Sana Mir

One Day International series
- Results: Pakistan won the 2-match series 2–0
Most runs	Cecelia Joyce (78)	Bismah Maroof (128)
Most wickets	Kim Garth (4)	Sadia Yousuf (8)

Twenty20 International series
- Results: Pakistan won the 1-match series 1–0
Most runs	Eimear Richardson (34)	Bismah Maroof (38)
Most wickets	Laura Delany (3)	Bismah Maroof (3)

=== Squads ===
Ireland	Pakistan
Isobel Joyce (c); Laura Delany; Kim Garth; Cecelia Joyce; Shauna Kavanagh; Amy Kenealy; Louise McCarthy; Lucy O'Reilly; Eimear Richardson; Rebecca Rolfe; Melissa Scott-Hayward; Clare Shillington; Elena Tice; Mary Waldron (wk)	Sana Mir (c); Nain Abidi; Nida Dar; Batool Fatima (wk); Asmavia Iqbal; Qanita Jalil; Iram Javed; Javeria Khan; Nahida Khan; Bismah Maroof; Javeria Rauf; Rabiya Shah; Sumaiya Siddiqi; Sadia Yousuf

=== Tour Match: Ireland Men Under-15s v Pakistan ===
15 July 2013
Scorecard

Pakistan; 107/6 (20 overs)	v	Ireland Men Under-15s; 108/5 (19.2 overs)
Nain Abidi 24 (24); Conor O'Gorman 2/15 (3 overs)		Andrew Delany 39 (47); Bismah Maroof 3/19 (3.2 overs)

Ireland Men Under-15s won by 5 wickets
Castle Avenue, Dublin
Umpires: Jeremy Jeffrey (Ire) and Conor McElhinney (Ire)

- Pakistan Women won the toss and elected to bat.

=== Only T20I ===
16 July 2013
Scorecard

Pakistan; 148/7 (20 overs)	v	Ireland; 110 (18.1 overs)
Bismah Maroof 38 (30); Laura Delany 3/15 (2 overs)		Eimear Richardson 34 (34); Bismah Maroof 3/21 (4 overs)

Pakistan Women won by 38 runs
YMCA Cricket Club, Dublin
Umpires: Gordon Black (Ire) and Louie Fourie (Ire)

- Pakistan Women won the toss and elected to bat.

=== WODI Series ===
==== 1st ODI ====
17 July 2013
Scorecard

Pakistan; 280/7 (50 overs)	v	Ireland; 123 (32.5 overs)
Nida Dar 87 (92); Kim Garth 3/39 (10 overs)		Cecelia Joyce 29 (48); Sadia Yousuf 3/18 (6.5 overs)

Pakistan Women won by 157 runs
Observatory Lane, Dublin
Umpires: Azam Baig (Ire) and Louie Fourie (Ire)

- Pakistan Women won the toss and elected to bat.

==== 2nd ODI ====
19 July 2013
Scorecard

Pakistan; 248 (49.1 overs)	v	Ireland; 159 (43.1 overs)
Javeria Khan 81 (105); Laura Delany 3/54 (9.1 overs)		Cecelia Joyce 49 (59); Sadia Yousuf 5/35 (9 overs)

Pakistan Women won by 89 runs
YMCA Cricket Club, Dublin
Umpires: Azam Baig (Ire) and Louie Fourie (Ire)

- Pakistan Women won the toss and elected to bat.

== See also ==
- 2013 ICC Women's World Twenty20 Qualifier
