= Pakistan women's cricket team in Sri Lanka in 2017–18 =

International cricket tour

Pakistan women's tour of Sri Lanka in 2017–18
	Sri Lanka women	Pakistan women
- Dates: 20 – 31 March 2018
Captains	Chamari Athapaththu	Bismah Maroof

One Day International series
- Results: Pakistan women won the 3-match series 3–0
Most runs	Chamari Athapaththu (70)	Javeria Khan (159)
Most wickets	Sripali Weerakkody (4); Shashikala Siriwardene (4)	Sana Mir (10)

Twenty20 International series
- Results: Pakistan women won the 3-match series 2–1
Most runs	Anushka Sanjeewani (95)	Javeria Khan (93)
Most wickets	Diana Baig (3); Sana Mir (3)	Sugandika Kumari (7)

The Pakistan women's cricket team played Sri Lanka women's cricket team in March 2018. The tour consisted of three Women's One Day Internationals (WODIs) and three Women's Twenty20 Internationals (WT20Is). The WODI games were part of the 2017–20 ICC Women's Championship. Ahead of the series, the Pakistan Cricket Board (PCB) selected twenty-one players to take part in a training camp in Lahore. Pakistan Women won the WODI series 3–0 and the WT20I series 2–1.

== Squads ==
WODIs		WT20Is	
Sri Lanka	Pakistan	Sri Lanka	Pakistan
Chamari Athapaththu (c); Kavisha Dilhari; Inoshi Fernando; Nipuni Hansika; Ama Kanchana; Achini Kulasuriya; Sugandika Kumari; Dilani Manodara; Hasini Perera; Chamari Polgampola; Inoka Ranaweera; Rebeca Vandort; Shashikala Siriwardene; Prasadani Weerakkody; Sripali Weerakkody	Bismah Maroof (c); Muneeba Ali; Sidra Ameen; Aiman Anwer; Diana Baig; Nida Dar; Ghulam Fatima; Kainat Imtiaz; Javeria Khan; Nahida Khan; Fareeha Mehmood; Sana Mir; Sidra Nawaz; Natalia Pervaiz; Nashra Sandhu	Chamari Athapaththu (c); Kavisha Dilhari; Nipuni Hansika; Ama Kanchana; Achini Kulasuriya; Sugandika Kumari; Dilani Manodara; Hasini Perera; Chamari Polgampola; Inoshi Priyadharshani; Inoka Ranaweera; Shashikala Siriwardene; Rebeca Vandort (wk); Prasadani Weerakkody; Sripali Weerakkody	Bismah Maroof (c); Muneeba Ali; Sidra Ameen; Aiman Anwer; Diana Baig; Nida Dar; Ghulam Fatima; Kainat Imtiaz; Javeria Khan; Nahida Khan; Fareeha Mehmood; Sana Mir; Sidra Nawaz; Natalia Pervaiz; Nashra Sandhu

== WODI series ==
=== 1st WODI ===
ICC Women's Championship
20 March 2018
09:50
Scorecard

Pakistan; 250/6 (50 overs)	v	Sri Lanka; 181 (45.2 overs)
Javeria Khan 113* (142); Shashikala Siriwardene 2/40 (10 overs)		Chamari Athapaththu 46 (57); Bismah Maroof 2/17 (5 overs)

Pakistan Women won by 69 runs
Rangiri Dambulla International Stadium, Dambulla
Umpires: Nilan De Silva (SL) and Hemantha Boteju (SL)
Player of the match: Javeria Khan (Pak)

- Sri Lanka Women won the toss and elected to field.
- Kavisha Dilhari (SL), Muneeba Ali and Natalia Pervaiz (Pak) all made their WODI debuts.
- Javeria Khan (Pak) scored her second century in WODIs.
- Points: Pakistan Women 2, Sri Lanka Women 0.

=== 2nd WODI ===
ICC Women's Championship
22 March 2018
09:50
Scorecard

Pakistan; 250/6 (50 overs)	v	Sri Lanka; 156 (37 overs)
Bismah Maroof 89 (90); Sripali Weerakkody 2/46 (10 overs)		Sripali Weerakkody 29* (28); Sana Mir 4/32 (10 overs)

Pakistan Women won by 94 runs
Rangiri Dambulla International Stadium, Dambulla
Umpires: Deepal Gunawardene (SL) and Pradeep Udawatta (SL)
Player of the match: Bismah Maroof (Pak)

- Pakistan Women won the toss and elected to bat.
- Points: Pakistan Women 2, Sri Lanka Women 0.

=== 3rd WODI ===
ICC Women's Championship
24 March 2018
09:50
Scorecard

Pakistan; 215/9 (50 overs)	v	Sri Lanka; 107 (41.3 overs)
Nahida Khan 46 (76); Ama Kanchana 2/35 (7 overs)		Nipuni Hansika 35 (40); Sana Mir 4/27 (10 overs)

Pakistan Women won by 108 runs
Rangiri Dambulla International Stadium, Dambulla
Umpires: Lyndon Hannibal (SL) and Rohitha Kottahachchi (SL)
Player of the match: Sana Mir (Pak)

- Pakistan Women won the toss and elected to bat.
- Points: Pakistan Women 2, Sri Lanka Women 0.

== WT20I series ==
=== 1st WT20I ===
28 March 2018
10:00
Scorecard

Sri Lanka; 129/6 (20 overs)	v	Pakistan; 133/9 (19.5 overs)
Anushka Sanjeewani 61 (58); Diana Baig 2/18 (4 overs)		Javeria Khan 52 (36); Sugandika Kumari 3/23 (4 overs)

Pakistan Women won by 1 wicket
Sinhalese Sports Club Ground, Colombo
Umpires: Nilan De Silva (SL) and Ravindra Kottahachchi (SL)
Player of the match: Javeria Khan (Pak)

- Pakistan Women won the toss and elected to field.
- Imalka Mendis (SL), Fareeha Mehmood and Ghulam Fatima (Pak) all made their WT20I debuts.
- Javeria Khan scored the fastest fifty for Pakistan Women in a WT20I (31 balls).

=== 2nd WT20I ===
30 March 2018
10:00
Scorecard

Pakistan; 72 (18.4 overs)	v	Sri Lanka; 73/3 (14.2 overs)
Bismah Maroof 20 (16); Shashikala Siriwardene 4/9 (3.4 overs)		Anushka Sanjeewani 20 (27); Nida Dar 1/5 (2 overs)

Sri Lanka Women won by 7 wickets
Nondescripts Cricket Club Ground, Colombo
Umpires: Pradeep Udawatta (SL) and Gamini Dissanayake (SL)
Player of the match: Shashikala Siriwardene (SL)

- Pakistan Women won the toss and elected to bat.
- This was Sri Lanka Women's first home win against Pakistan Women in WT20Is, and their largest victory in terms of balls remaining (34).

=== 3rd WT20I ===
31 March 2018
10:00
Scorecard

Pakistan; 113/6 (20 overs)	v	Sri Lanka; 75/8 (20 overs)
Javeria Khan 38 (38); Sugandika Kumari 2/20 (4 overs)		Imalka Mendis 25* (39); Bismah Maroof 2/14 (4 overs)

Pakistan Women won by 38 runs
Sinhalese Sports Club Ground, Colombo
Umpires: Rohitha Kottahachchi (SL) and Gamini Dissanayake (SL)
Player of the match: Javeria Khan (Pak)

- Sri Lanka Women won the toss and elected to field.
