= Punjab women's cricket team =

Punjab women's cricket team may refer to:

- Punjab women's cricket team (India)
- Punjab women's cricket team (Pakistan)
