= Sindh women's cricket team =

Pakistani women's cricket team

Sindh Women
Personnel
- Captain: Sumaiya Siddiqi

Team information
- Founded: Unknown First recorded match: 2012

History
- WCCT wins: 0

The Sindh women's cricket team is the women's representative cricket team for the Pakistani province of Sindh. They competed in the Women's Cricket Challenge Trophy in 2011–12 and 2012–13.

== History ==
Sindh competed in the Twenty20 Women's Cricket Challenge Trophy in its first two seasons, in 2011–12 and 2012–13. They finished bottom of their group in both seasons, their only win across the two seasons being a victory by 2 wickets against Balochistan in 2013.

== Players ==
=== Notable players ===
The players who played for both Sindh and for Pakistan internationally are listed below, in order of first international appearance (given in brackets):

- (Pakistan) Sajjida Shah (2000)
- (Pakistan) Armaan Khan (2005)
- (Pakistan) Sumaiya Siddiqi (2007)
- (Pakistan) Javeria Rauf (2008)
- (Pakistan) Shumaila Qureshi (2010)
- (Pakistan) Kainat Imtiaz (2010)
- (Pakistan) Masooma Junaid (2011)
- (Pakistan) Ayesha Zafar (2015)
- (Pakistan) Aiman Anwer (2016)
- (Pakistan) Rameen Shamim (2019)

== Seasons ==
=== Women's Cricket Challenge Trophy ===
Season	Division	League standings								Notes
Season	Division	P	W	L	T	A/C	Pts	NRR	Pos	Notes
2011–12	Pool B	2	0	2	0	0	0	–3.409	3rd	
2012–13	Group A	2	1	1	0	0	0	–0.500	3rd	

== See also ==
- Sindh cricket team
