= Higher Education Commission women's cricket team =

Pakistani women's cricket team

Higher Education Commission Women
Personnel
- Captain: Diana Baig

Team information
- Founded: Unknown First recorded match: 2012

History
- NWCC wins: 0
- WCCT wins: 0
- DT20 wins: 0

The Higher Education Commission women's cricket team is a Pakistani women's cricket team, sponsored by the Higher Education Commission, who play domestic cricket in Pakistan. They competed in the National Women's Cricket Championship, the Women's Cricket Challenge Trophy and the Departmental T20 Women's Championship between 2011–12 and 2018–19.

== History ==
Higher Education Commission first played in the 2011–12 season, in the National Women's Cricket Championship. They reached the final of this one-day cricket competition in their first season, but lost to Zarai Taraqiati Bank Limited by 181 runs. They went on to reach the final of the competition twice more, in 2015 and 2017, as well as finishing second in the final league stage in 2012–13. Each time, however, they again lost out to Zarai Taraqiati Bank Limited.

They also competed in two Twenty20 competitions, the Women's Cricket Challenge Trophy between 2014 and 2016–17 and the Departmental T20 Women's Championship in 2018 and 2018–19. Each time, they finished fourth in the initial group stage of the competitions, winning just two matches across the five seasons.

== Players ==
=== Notable players ===
The players who have played for the Higher Education Commission and also for Pakistan internationally are listed below, in order of first international appearance (given in brackets):

- (Pakistan) Sumaiya Siddiqi (2007)
- (Pakistan) Sukhan Faiz (2009)
- (Pakistan) Sidra Ameen (2011)
- (Pakistan) Iram Javed (2013)
- (Pakistan) Anam Amin (2014)
- (Pakistan) Sidra Nawaz (2014)
- (Pakistan) Aliya Riaz (2014)
- (Pakistan) Diana Baig (2015)
- (Pakistan) Ghulam Fatima (2017)
- (Pakistan) Nashra Sandhu (2017)
- (Pakistan) Natalia Pervaiz (2017)
- (Pakistan) Fareeha Mehmood (2018)
- (Pakistan) Sadia Iqbal (2019)
- (Pakistan) Saba Nazir (2019)
- (Pakistan) Kaynat Hafeez (2019)
- (Pakistan) Tuba Hassan (2022)
- (Pakistan) Gull Feroza (2022)
- (Pakistan) Sadaf Shamas (2022)
- (Pakistan) Umm-e-Hani (2022)

== Seasons ==
=== National Women's Cricket Championship ===
Season	Division	League standings								Notes
Season	Division	P	W	L	T	A/C	Pts	NRR	Pos	Notes
2011–12	Zone C	3	3	0	0	0	12	+2.976	1st	Lost final
2012–13	Pool A	6	4	2	0	0	0	+0.644	2nd	
2015	Super League	5	4	1	0	0	8	+0.896	2nd	Lost final
2016	Pool A	4	1	3	0	0	2	–0.198	4th	
2017	Departmental	3	2	1	0	0	4	–0.126	2nd	Lost final

=== Women's Cricket Challenge Trophy ===
Season	League standings								Notes
Season	P	W	L	T	A/C	Pts	NRR	Pos	Notes
2014	3	1	2	0	0	2	–1.816	4th	
2015–16	4	1	2	0	1	3	–1.755	4th	
2016–17	3	0	3	0	0	0	–2.997	4th	

=== Departmental T20 Women's Championship ===
Season	League standings								Notes
Season	P	W	L	T	A/C	Pts	NRR	Pos	Notes
2018	6	0	6	0	0	0	–2.344	4th	
2018–19	6	0	6	0	0	0	–1.957	4th	

== Honours ==
- National Women's Cricket Championship:
  - Winners (0):
  - Best finish: Runners-up (2011–12, 2012–13, 2015 & 2017)
