= List of Pakistan women Twenty20 International cricketers =

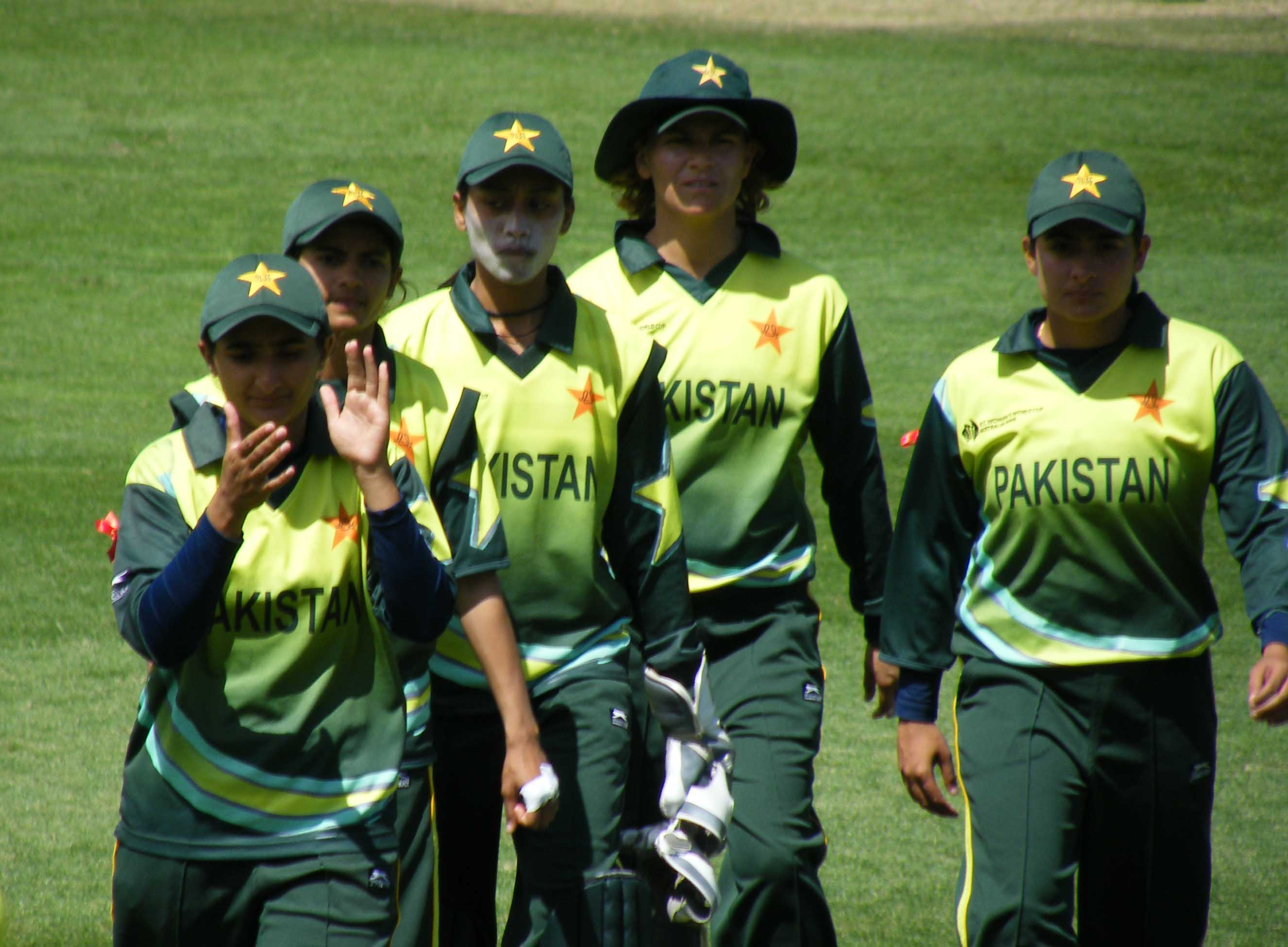
Players of the Pakistan women's team during the 2009 ICC Women's World Twenty20

A women's Twenty20 International (T20I) is a 20 overs-per-side cricket match played between two representative side, each with WT20I status as approved by the International Cricket Council (ICC). The first women's T20I match was held in August 2004 between England and New Zealand. The Pakistan national women's cricket team played its first T20I match at the Vineyard, Dublin in 2009, losing to Ireland by 9 wickets.

Since the team made its first appearance in 2009, 55 women have represented Pakistan in T20I cricket. This list includes all players who have played at least one T20I match and is initially arranged in the order of debut appearance. Where more than one player won their first cap in the same match, those players are initially listed alphabetically by last name at the time of debut.

== Key ==
General

- ‡ – Captain
- † – Wicket-keeper
- First – Year of debut
- Last – Year of last game
- Mat – Number of matches played

Fielding

- Ca – Catches taken
- St – Stumpings effected

Batting

- Runs – Runs scored in career
- HS – Highest score
- 100 – Centuries scored
- 50 – Half-centuries scored
- Avg – Runs scored per dismissal
- * – Batter remained not out

Bowling

- Balls – Balls bowled in career
- Wkt – Wickets taken in career
- BBI – Best bowling in an innings
- Ave – Average runs per wicket

Captains

- Won – Number of games won
- Lost – Number of games lost
- Tied – Number of games tied
- Win% – Ratio of games won to those captained (Note: Percentage is worked out by counting tied games as half a win.)

== Players ==
Statistics are correct as of 22 September 2026

Pakistan women T20I cricketers
General					Batting					Bowling				Fielding		Ref
Cap	Name	First	Last	Mat	Runs	HS	Avg	50	100	Balls	Wkt	BBI	Ave	Ca	St	Ref
1	Almas Akram	2009	2009	4	16	12	5.33	0	0	30	1	1/11	46.00	0	0	
2	Asmavia Iqbal	2009	2016	68	421	35	10.02	0	0	1,005	44	4/16	22.75	18	0	
3	Batool Fatima †	2009	2014	45	64	11*	5.81	0	0	—	—	—	—	11	39	
4	Javeria Khan ‡	2009	2023	112	2,018	74*	21.69	10	0	240	11	2/23	20.18	16	0	
5	Marina Iqbal	2009	2015	42	340	42	10.30	0	0	84	2	1/15	52.50	16	0	
6	Nain Abidi	2009	2018	68	972	56	18.00	3	0	24	1	1/17	17.00	22	0	
7	Nazia Sadiq	2009	2009	3	34	23	11.33	0	0	—	—	—	—	0	0	
8	Qanita Jalil	2009	2015	51	223	21	6.37	0	0	705	22	2/9	29.59	7	0	
9	Sajjida Shah	2009	2010	8	86	27	12.28	0	0	72	3	1/11	24.00	3	0	
10	Sana Mir ‡	2009	2019	106	802	48*	14.07	0	0	2,270	89	4/13	23.42	26	0	
11	Urooj Mumtaz	2009	2010	9	87	26	12.42	0	0	177	6	2/14	21.16	3	0	
12	Armaan Khan †	2009	2010	5	4	2	0.80	0	0	—	—	—	—	8	2	
13	Bismah Maroof ‡	2009	2023	140	2,893	70*	27.55	12	0	874	36	3/21	22.77	37	0	
14	Nida Dar ‡	2010	2024	160	2,091	75	17.87	7	0	3,062	144	5/21	20.20	42	0	
15	Sania Khan ‡	2010	2016	25	63	15	7.87	0	0	425	23	3/15	19.60	3	0	
16	Rabiya Shah †	2010	2015	15	6	2	3.00	0	0	—	—	—	—	0	8	
17	Sadia Yousuf	2010	2017	51	14	3	1.40	0	0	1,048	57	4/9	17.82	2	0	
18	Nahida Khan †	2009	2021	54	604	43	13.13	0	0	6	0	—	—	13	2	
19	Shumaila Qureshi	2010	2010	1	0	0	0.00	0	0	24	1	1/20	20.00	0	0	
20	Kanwal Naz	2010	2010	2	—	—	—	—	—	42	0	—	—	0	0	
21	Mariam Hasan	2010	2012	5	9	8*	2.50	0	0	—	—	—	—	0	0	
22	Kainat Imtiaz	2011	2022	21	137	29	12.45	0	0	168	8	2/18	20.37	2	0	
23	Masooma Junaid	2011	2012	6	2	2*	2.00	0	0	54	0	—	—	1	0	
24	Sidra Ameen	2011	2026	68	1070	63	17.83	4	0	—	—	—	—	22	0	
25	Elizebath Khan	2012	2012	1	—	—	—	—	—	12	0	—	—	0	0	
26	Sumaiya Siddiqi	2007	2015	15	16	9	8.00	0	0	270	9	2/9	25.22	0	0	
27	Javeria Rauf	2012	2021	13	137	40*	12.45	0	0	60	4	2/23	16.00	2	0	
28	Iram Javed	2013	2026	64	509	55	9.98	1	0	43	1	1/19	55.00	17	0	
29	Anam Amin	2014	2022	65	3	2*	3.00	0	0	1,400	61	4/16	21.06	11	0	
30	Aliya Riaz ‡	2014	2026	117	1,425	57*	20.07	2	0	476	20	2/16	31.50	40	0	
31	Sidra Nawaz †	2014	2023	56	177	22	8.04	0	0	—	—	—	—	18	27	
32	Maham Tariq	2014	2016	3	—	—	—	—	—	48	1	1/11	75.00	0	0	
33	Naila Nazir	2015	2015	1	—	—	—	—	—	18	0	—	—	0	0	
34	Ayesha Zafar	2015	2026	50	750	102*	16.30	1	1	180	12	3/13	16.83	10	0	
35	Diana Baig	2015	2026	59	66	8*	4.71	0	0	1,079	41	3/26	28.60	17	0	
36	Muneeba Ali †	2016	2026	101	1,893	102	20.57	4	2	—	—	—	—	31	23	
37	Aiman Anwer	2016	2023	37	41	9	5.12	0	0	734	29	3/30	29.44	9	0	
38	Nashra Sandhu	2017	2026	92	70	9*	4.66	0	0	2,023	92	6/7	20.48	19	0	
39	Natalia Pervaiz	2017	2026	30	229	31	10.40	0	0	114	9	3/20	14.55	8	0	
40	Ghulam Fatima	2018	2022	5	6	6*	6.00	0	0	98	2	1/26	54.00	0	0	
41	Fareeha Mehmood †	2018	2018	3	7	5	3.50	0	0	—	—	—	—	1	0	
42	Omaima Sohail	2018	2024	55	481	43	11.45	0	0	354	18	5/13	18.94	15	0	
43	Fatima Sana‡	2019	2026	70	871	957	33.00	3	0	1,315	72	4/26	22.47	27	0	
44	Rameen Shamim	2019	2026	19	102	27	14.57	0	0	385	15	3/36	30.00	4	0	
45	Sadia Iqbal	2019	2026	68	20	8	2.50	0	0	1,533	85	4/16	17.51	13	0	
46	Saba Nazir	2019	2019	1	4	4*	—	0	0	24	2	2/22	11.00	0	0	
47	Syeda Aroob Shah	2019	2024	15	21	14*	5.25	0	0	234	5	2/9	54.60	4	0	
48	Ayesha Naseem	2020	2023	30	369	45*	18.45	0	0	—	—	—	—	1	0	
49	Gull Feroza	2022	2026	39	569	63*	15.80	3	0	—	—	—	—	10	0	
50	Tuba Hassan	2022	2026	54	197	28	10.94	0	0	917	33	3/8	29.96	11	0	
51	Sadaf Shamas	2023	2026	16	97	35	6.92	0	0	6	0	—	—	6	0	
52	Shawaal Zulfiqar	2023	2026	19	447	63	23.52	2	0	4	0	—	—	4	0	
53	Umm-e-Hani	2023	2026	19	80	17	10.00	0	0	395	13	3/10	31.46	3	0	
54	Najiha Alvi †	2023	2026	9	19	7*	4.75	0	0	—	—	—	—	3	3	
55	Waheeda Akhtar	2023	2026	9	2	2	0.66	0	0	162	6	2/20	34.33	4	0	
56	Tasmia Rubab	2024	2026	7	8	7*	8.00	0	0	120	3	1/25	68.00	1	0	
57	Eyman Fatima	2025	2026	17	166	79*	13.83	1	0	—	—	—	—	2	0	
58	Humna Bilal	2026	2026	2	2	1*	2.00	0	0	32	2	1/17	24.50	1	0	
59	Amber Kainat	2026	2026	1	—	—	—	—	—	12	0	—	—	1	0	
60	Saira Jabeen	2026	2026	15	203	50*	16.91	1	0	25	0	—	—	9	0	
61	Eman Naseer	2026	2026	3	45	21	22.50	0	0	—	—	—	—	0	0	
62	Momina Riasat	2026	2026	4	—	—	—	—	—	78	2	2/18	52.00	0	0	

== WT20I captains ==
No.	Name	First	Last	Mat	Won	Lost	Tied	No result	Win% (Note: The result percentage counts ties as half a win (regardless of any tie-breaker) and excludes no results.)
1	Sana Mir	2009	2016	65	26	36	2	1	42.18
2	Sania Khan	2010	2010	2	1	1	0	0	50.00
3	Bismah Maroof	2013	2023	62	27	32	1	2	45.83
4	Javeria Khan	2018	2021	16	5	10	0	1	33.33
5	Aliya Riaz	2021	2021	2	0	2	0	0	0.00
6	Nida Dar	2023	2024	24	9	15	0	0	37.50
7	Fatima Sana	2024	2026	27	10	16	0	1	38.46
