= Federal Capital women's cricket team =

Pakistani women's cricket team

Federal Capital Women
Personnel
- Captain: Marrium Hasan

Team information
- Founded: Unknown First recorded match: 2012

History
- WCCT wins: 0

The Federal Capital women's cricket team is the women's representative cricket team for the Islamabad Capital Territory, in domestic cricket in Pakistan. They competed in the Women's Cricket Challenge Trophy in 2011–12 and 2012–13.

== History ==
Federal Capital competed in the Twenty20 Women's Cricket Challenge Trophy in its first two seasons, in 2011–12 and 2012–13. They finished second in their group in both seasons, winning one match and losing one match in both tournaments.

== Players ==
=== Notable players ===
The players who have played for Federal Capital and for Pakistan internationally are listed below, in order of first international appearance (given in brackets):

- (Pakistan) Naila Nazir (2009)
- (Pakistan) Sidra Nawaz (2014)
- (Pakistan) Aliya Riaz (2014)
- (Pakistan) Diana Baig (2015)
- (Pakistan) Fareeha Mehmood (2018)

== Seasons ==
=== Women's Cricket Challenge Trophy ===
Season	Division	League standings								Notes
Season	Division	P	W	L	T	A/C	Pts	NRR	Pos	Notes
2011–12	Pool A	2	1	1	0	0	2	+0.874	2nd	
2012–13	Group B	2	1	1	0	0	2	–0.186	2nd	

== See also ==
- Islamabad women's cricket team
- Federal Areas cricket team
