= Omar Associates women's cricket team =

Pakistani women's cricket team

Omar Associates Women
Personnel
- Captain: Asmavia Iqbal

Team information
- Founded: Unknown First recorded match: 2014

History
- NWCC wins: 0
- WCCT wins: 1

The Omar Associates women's cricket team is a Pakistani women's cricket team, sponsored by Omar Associates. They competed in the National Women's Cricket Championship and the Women's Cricket Challenge Trophy from 2014 to 2016. They won the 2014 Women's Cricket Challenge Trophy, shared with Zarai Taraqiati Bank Limited.

== History ==
Omar Associates first competed in the 2014 Women's Cricket Challenge Trophy, in which they qualified for the final on Net Run Rate after winning one of their three group stage matches. The final against Zarai Taraqiati Bank Limited was curtailed due to rain, so the title was shared between the two teams. The next season of the Challenge Trophy, 2015–16, Omar Associates finished third in their group, with two wins from four matches.

Omar Associates also competed in the National Women's Cricket Championship in 2015 and 2016. In 2015, they reached the Super League stage of the competition, and eventually finished third overall. In 2016, all three of their matches were cancelled via walk-over.

== Players ==
=== Notable players ===
Players who played for Omar Associates and played internationally are listed below, in order of first international appearance (given in brackets):

- (Pakistan) Asmavia Iqbal (2005)
- (Pakistan) Sumaiya Siddiqi (2007)
- (Pakistan) Sadia Yousuf (2008)
- (Pakistan) Javeria Rauf (2008)
- (Pakistan) Naila Nazir (2009)
- (Pakistan) Marina Iqbal (2009)
- (Pakistan) Shumaila Qureshi (2010)
- (Pakistan) Mariam Hasan (2010)
- (Pakistan) Kainat Imtiaz (2010)
- (Pakistan) Sidra Ameen (2011)
- (Pakistan) Iram Javed (2013)
- (Pakistan) Maham Tariq (2014)
- (Pakistan) Sidra Nawaz (2014)
- (Pakistan) Muneeba Ali (2016)
- (Pakistan) Nashra Sandhu (2017)
- (Pakistan) Fareeha Mehmood (2018)
- (Pakistan) Omaima Sohail (2018)
- (Pakistan) Rameen Shamim (2019)
- (Pakistan) Waheeda Akhtar (2023)

== Seasons ==
=== National Women's Cricket Championship ===
Season	Division	League standings								Notes
Season	Division	P	W	L	T	A/C	Pts	NRR	Pos	Notes
2015	Super League	5	3	2	0	0	6	+1.562	3rd	
2016	Pool A	3	1	2	0	0	2	—	3rd	

=== Women's Cricket Challenge Trophy ===
Season	League standings								Notes
Season	P	W	L	T	A/C	Pts	NRR	Pos	Notes
2014	3	1	2	0	0	2	+0.125	2nd	Champions
2015–16	4	2	2	0	0	4	+0.564	3rd	

== Honours ==
- National Women's Cricket Championship:
  - Winners (0):
  - Best finish: 3rd (2015)
- Women's Cricket Challenge Trophy
  - Winners (1): 2014
