= Punjab women's cricket team (Pakistan) =

Pakistani women's cricket team

Punjab Women
Personnel
- Captain: Marina Iqbal

Team information
- Founded: Unknown First recorded match: 2012

History
- WCCT wins: 0

The Punjab women's cricket team is the women's representative cricket team for the Pakistani province of Punjab. They competed in the Women's Cricket Challenge Trophy in 2011–12 and 2012–13.

== History ==
Punjab competed in the Twenty20 Women's Cricket Challenge Trophy in its first two seasons, in 2011–12 and 2012–13. They finished top of their group in both seasons, qualifying for the final. However, they lost the final both times, by 93 runs and 60 runs, both to Zarai Taraqiati Bank Limited.

== Players ==
=== Notable players ===
The players who have played for Punjab and for Pakistan internationally are listed below, in order of first international appearance (given in brackets):

- (Pakistan) Marina Iqbal (2009)
- (Pakistan) Sidra Ameen (2011)
- (Pakistan) Elizebath Khan (2012)
- (Pakistan) Iram Javed (2013)
- (Pakistan) Anam Amin (2014)
- (Pakistan) Sidra Nawaz (2014)

== Seasons ==
=== Women's Cricket Challenge Trophy ===
Season	Division	League standings								Notes
Season	Division	P	W	L	T	A/C	Pts	NRR	Pos	Notes
2011–12	Pool A	2	2	0	0	0	4	+0.616	1st	Lost final
2012–13	Group A	2	1	1	0	0	2	+0.400	1st	Lost final

== Honours ==
- Women's Cricket Challenge Trophy:
  - Winners (0):
  - Best finish: Runners-up (2011–12 & 2012–13)

== See also ==
- Punjab cricket team (Pakistan)
