= State Bank of Pakistan women's cricket team =

Pakistani women's cricket team

State Bank of Pakistan Women
Personnel
- Captain: Aliya Riaz

Team information
- Founded: Unknown First recorded match: 2016

History
- NWCC wins: 0
- WCCT wins: 0
- DT20 wins: 0

The State Bank of Pakistan women's cricket team is a Pakistani women's cricket team, sponsored by the State Bank of Pakistan. They competed in the National Women's Cricket Championship, the Women's Cricket Challenge Trophy and the Departmental T20 Women's Championship between 2016 and 2018–19.

== History ==
State Bank of Pakistan first competed in the Women's Cricket Challenge Trophy in 2015–16, in which they qualified for the final after finishing second in the group of five. The side lost in the final to Zarai Taraqiati Bank Limited by 70 runs. The 2016–17 season of the Challenge Trophy's final was a virtual replay of the previous year's final, with the State Bank of Pakistan again reaching the final, and again losing to Zarai Taraqiati Bank Limited.

State Bank of Pakistan also competed in the National Women's Cricket Championship in 2016 and 2017. The side reached the final in 2016, after winning Pool C and finishing second in the Super League round, but lost in the final to Zarai Taraqiati Bank Limited. In 2017, the side finished third in the Departmental section of the tournament, with one win from their three matches.

In the 2018 and 2018–19 seasons, State Bank of Pakistan competed in the Departmental T20 Women's Championship. They finished third in the group of four in 2018, whilst they reached the final in 2018–19, but again lost out to Zarai Taraqiati Bank Limited.

== Players ==
=== Notable players ===
Players who played for State Bank of Pakistan and played internationally are listed below, in order of first international appearance (given in brackets):

- (Pakistan) Asmavia Iqbal (2005)
- (Pakistan) Sumaiya Siddiqi (2007)
- (Pakistan) Sadia Yousuf (2008)
- (Pakistan) Marina Iqbal (2009)
- (Pakistan) Kainat Imtiaz (2010)
- (Pakistan) Sidra Ameen (2011)
- (Pakistan) Elizebath Khan (2012)
- (Pakistan) Javeria Rauf (2012)
- (Pakistan) Iram Javed (2013)
- (Pakistan) Anam Amin (2014)
- (Pakistan) Maham Tariq (2014)
- (Pakistan) Sidra Nawaz (2014)
- (Pakistan) Aliya Riaz (2014)
- (Pakistan) Ayesha Zafar (2015)
- (Pakistan) Muneeba Ali (2016)
- (Pakistan) Ghulam Fatima (2017)
- (Pakistan) Natalia Pervaiz (2017)
- (Pakistan) Fareeha Mehmood (2018)
- (Pakistan) Omaima Sohail (2018)
- (Pakistan) Kaynat Hafeez (2019)

== Seasons ==
=== National Women's Cricket Championship ===
Season	Division	League standings								Notes
Season	Division	P	W	L	T	A/C	Pts	NRR	Pos	Notes
2016	Super League	5	4	1	0	0	8	+3.342	2nd	Lost final
2017	Departmental	3	1	2	0	0	2	–0.226	3rd	

=== Women's Cricket Challenge Trophy ===
Season	League standings								Notes
Season	P	W	L	T	A/C	Pts	NRR	Pos	Notes
2015–16	4	2	1	0	1	5	+0.893	2nd	Lost final
2016–17	3	2	1	0	0	4	+1.649	2nd	Lost final

=== Departmental T20 Women's Championship ===
Season	League standings								Notes
Season	P	W	L	T	A/C	Pts	NRR	Pos	Notes
2018	6	2	4	0	0	4	+0.285	3rd	
2018–19	6	5	1	0	0	10	+0.842	2nd	Lost final

== Honours ==
- National Women's Cricket Championship:
  - Winners (0):
  - Best finish: Runners-up (2016)
- Women's Cricket Challenge Trophy
  - Winners (0):
  - Best finish: Runners-up (2018–19)
- Departmental T20 Women's Championship
  - Winners (0):
  - Best finish: Runners-up (2015–16 & 2016–17)

== See also ==
- State Bank of Pakistan cricket team
