= Elizebath Khan =

Pakistani cricketer (born 1989)

Personal information
- Full name: Elizebath Barkat Khan
- Born: 6 April 1989 (age 37); Lahore, Pakistan
- Batting: Right-handed
- Bowling: Right-arm medium-fast
- Role: Bowler

International information
- National side: Pakistan (2012)
- Only ODI (cap 64): 20 August 2012 v Bangladesh
- Only T20I (cap 25): 29 August 2012 v Ireland

Domestic team information
- Years: Team
- 2009/10–2014: Lahore
- 2011/12: Balochistan
- 2012/13: Punjab
- 2015: Saif Sports Saga
- 2015/16–2018: State Bank of Pakistan

Career statistics
Competition	WODI	WT20I	WLA	WT20
Matches	1	1	46	20
Runs scored	–	–	121	41
Batting average	–	–	8.64	8.20
100s/50s	–	–	0/0	0/0
Top score	–	–	14*	13
Balls bowled	18	12	2,102	424
Wickets	0	0	65	20
Bowling average	–	–	14.47	19.10
5 wickets in innings	0	0	1	0
10 wickets in match	0	0	0	0
Best bowling	–	—	5/26	3/15
Catches/stumpings	0/–	0/–	10/–	0/–
- Source: CricketArchive, 2 January 2022

Elizebath Barkat Khan (born 6 April 1989) is a Pakistani former cricketer who played as a right-arm medium-fast bowler. She appeared in one One Day International and one Twenty20 International for Pakistan in 2012. She played domestic cricket for Lahore, Balochistan, Punjab, Saif Sports Saga and State Bank of Pakistan.
