= Sajjida Shah =

Pakistani cricketer

Personal information
- Full name: Sajjida Bibi Shah
- Born: 3 February 1988 (age 38); Hyderabad, Pakistan
- Batting: Right-handed
- Bowling: Right arm off break
- Role: All-rounder

International information
- National side: Pakistan (2000–2010)
- Test debut (cap 15): 30 July 2000 v Ireland
- Last Test: 18 March 2004 v West Indies
- ODI debut (cap 24): 23 July 2000 v Ireland
- Last ODI: 26 May 2009 v Ireland
- ODI shirt no.: 12
- T20I debut (cap 9): 25 May 2009 v Ireland
- Last T20I: 8 May 2010 v India

Domestic team information
- Years: Team
- 2005/06–2007/08: Hyderabad
- 2009/10–2010/11: Zarai Taraqiati Bank Limited
- 2011/12: Balochistan
- 2012/13: Sindh
- 2012/13–2016/17: Hyderabad

Career statistics
Competition	WTest	WODI	WT20I	WLA
Matches	2	60	8	99
Runs scored	100	863	86	2,028
Batting average	33.33	15.98	12.28	26.68
100s/50s	0/1	0/1	0/0	2/11
Top score	98	52	27*	158
Balls bowled	6	2,724	72	4,007
Wickets	0	51	3	86
Bowling average	–	28.88	24.00	23.72
5 wickets in innings	0	1	0	1
10 wickets in match	0	0	0	0
Best bowling	–	7/4	1/11	7/4
Catches/stumpings	0/–	8/–	3/–	23/–
- Source: CricketArchive, 11 December 2021

Sajjida Bibi Shah (born 25 June 1988) is a Pakistani former cricketer who played as an all-rounder, batting right-handed and bowling right-arm off break. She appeared in two Test matches, 60 One Day Internationals and eight Twenty20 Internationals for Pakistan between 2000 and 2010. She played domestic cricket for Hyderabad, Balochistan, Sindh and Zarai Taraqiati Bank Limited.

== Playing career ==
Sajjida Shah made her debut for Pakistan in a One-Day International (ODI) against Ireland on 23 July 2000 when aged just twelve. She played four ODIs on that tour, and also played her first Test match, in what is Ireland's only women's Test to date.

In 2001, she played seven ODIs against the Netherlands in Karachi and in 2002 played six ODIs against Sri Lanka in Sri Lanka, before what is perhaps the finest moment of her career to date happened in 2003.

At the 2003 IWCC Trophy in the Netherlands, she played in all five of Pakistan's matches. In the opening match against Japan, she tore through the Japanese batting line-up, taking seven wickets for just four runs. This was not just the best bowling performance in the tournament but also remains the best innings bowling performance in the history of women's ODI cricket. She took twelve wickets overall to become the tournament's top wicket-taker. She is also the youngest woman cricketer to take a five-wicket haul in Women's ODI history (at the age of 15 years and 168 days).

The following year, the West Indies toured Pakistan and Shah played in seven ODIs and a Test match against them. The Test is her (and Pakistan Women's) last Test match to date. Since then, she has played in two Asia Cup tournaments and five ODIs against South Africa.
