= Armaan Khan (cricketer) =

Pakistani cricketer (born 1980)

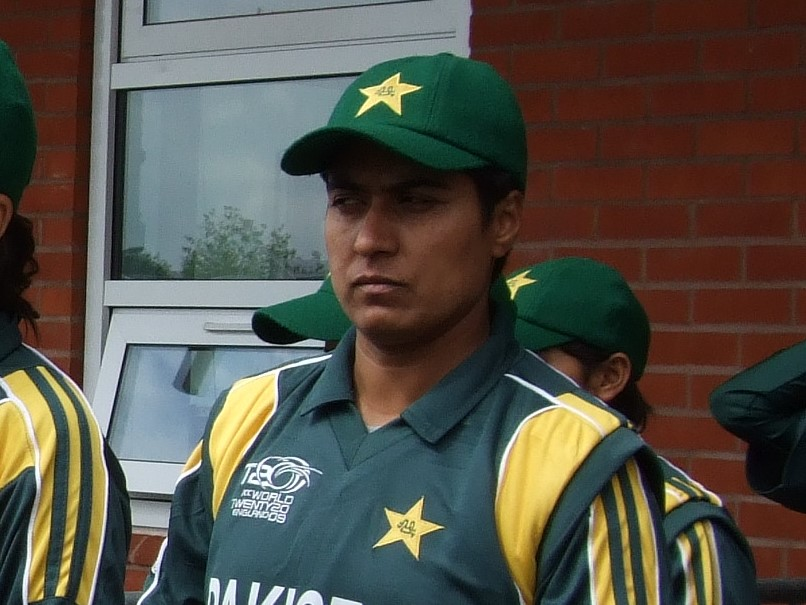
- Armaan Khan in 2009

Personal information
- Full name: Armaan Khan
- Born: 4 April 1980 (age 46); Chaghi, Balochistan, Pakistan
- Batting: Right-handed
- Role: Wicket-keeper

International information
- National side: Pakistan (2005–2010)
- ODI debut (cap 36): 28 December 2005 v Sri Lanka
- Last ODI: 21 March 2009 v West Indies
- T20I debut (cap 12): 28 March 2009 v Ireland
- Last T20I: 6 May 2010 v Sri Lanka

Domestic team information
- Years: Team
- 2004/05–2015: Karachi
- 2011/12: Balochistan
- 2012/13: Sindh
- 2014: Saif Sports Saga

Career statistics
Competition	WODI	WT20I	WLA	WT20
Matches	12	5	52	23
Runs scored	114	4	934	253
Batting average	10.36	0.80	25.94	12.65
100s/50s	0/0	0/0	0/2	0/0
Top score	43*	2	98*	49
Balls bowled	–	–	12	–
Wickets	–	–	1	–
Bowling average	–	–	17.00	–
5 wickets in innings	–	–	0	–
10 wickets in match	–	–	0	–
Best bowling	–	–	1/10	–
Catches/stumpings	8/2	0/–	20/5	5/2
- Source: CricketArchive, 2 January 2022

Armaan Khan (born 4 April 1980) is a Pakistani former cricketer who played as a wicket-keeper and right-handed batter. She appeared in 12 One Day Internationals and five Twenty20 Internationals for Pakistan from 2005 to 2010. She played domestic cricket for Karachi, Balochistan, Sindh and Saif Sports Saga.
