= Khyber Pakhtunkhwa women's cricket team =

Pakistani women's cricket team

Khyber Pakhtunkhwa Women
Personnel
- Captain: Salma Faiz

Team information
- Founded: Unknown First recorded match: 2012

History
- WCCT wins: 0

The Khyber Pakhtunkhwa women's cricket team is the women's representative cricket team for the Pakistani province of Khyber Pakhtunkhwa. They competed in the Women's Cricket Challenge Trophy in 2011–12 and 2012–13.

== History ==
Khyber Pakhtunkhwa competed in the Twenty20 Women's Cricket Challenge Trophy in the first two seasons of the one-day tournament, in 2011–12 and 2012–13. They finished bottom of their group in both seasons, losing all four matches they played.

== Players ==
=== Notable players ===
Players who played for Khyber Pakhtunkhwa and played internationally are listed below, in order of first international appearance (given in brackets):

- (Pakistan) Sabahat Rasheed (2005)
- (Pakistan) Sukhan Faiz (2009)
- (Pakistan) Omaima Sohail (2018)

== Seasons ==
=== Women's Cricket Challenge Trophy ===
Season	Division	League standings								Notes
Season	Division	P	W	L	T	A/C	Pts	NRR	Pos	Notes
2011–12	Pool A	2	0	2	0	0	0	–1.460	3rd	
2012–13	Group B	2	0	2	0	0	0	–4.262	3rd	

== See also ==
- Khyber Pakhtunkhwa cricket team
