= Saif Sports Saga women's cricket team =

Pakistani women's cricket team

Saif Sports Saga Women
Personnel
- Captain: Asmavia Iqbal

Team information
- Founded: Unknown First recorded match: 2014

History
- NWCC wins: 0
- WCCT wins: 0

The Saif Sports Saga women's cricket team is a Pakistani women's cricket team, sponsored by the Saif Sports Saga. They competed in the National Women's Cricket Championship and the Women's Cricket Challenge Trophy from 2014 to 2016.

== History ==
Saif Sports Saga first competed in the Women's Cricket Challenge Trophy in 2014, finishing third out of four teams. The following season, 2015–16, they finished bottom of the five team group.

The side also competed in the National Women's Cricket Championship in 2015 and 2016, both times reaching the final Super League stage, finishing 4th overall in 2015 and 3rd overall in 2016.

== Players ==
=== Notable players ===
The players who played for Saif Sports Saga and for Pakistan internationally are listed below, in order of first international appearance (given in brackets):

- (Pakistan) Armaan Khan (2005)
- (Pakistan) Asmavia Iqbal (2005)
- (Pakistan) Sabahat Rasheed (2005)
- (Pakistan) Sumaiya Siddiqi (2007)
- (Pakistan) Nahida Khan (2009)
- (Pakistan) Marina Iqbal (2009)
- (Pakistan) Kainat Imtiaz (2010)
- (Pakistan) Elizebath Khan (2012)
- (Pakistan) Javeria Rauf (2012)
- (Pakistan) Sidra Nawaz (2014)
- (Pakistan) Diana Baig (2015)
- (Pakistan) Ayesha Zafar (2015)
- (Pakistan) Nashra Sandhu (2017)
- (Pakistan) Aiman Anwer (2016)
- (Pakistan) Rameen Shamim (2019)
- (Pakistan) Waheeda Akhtar (2023)

== Seasons ==
=== National Women's Cricket Championship ===
Season	Division	League standings								Notes
Season	Division	P	W	L	T	A/C	Pts	NRR	Pos	Notes
2015	Super League	5	2	3	0	0	4	–0.011	4th	
2016	Super League	5	3	2	0	0	6	+2.347	3rd	

=== Women's Cricket Challenge Trophy ===
Season	League standings								Notes
Season	P	W	L	T	A/C	Pts	NRR	Pos	Notes
2014	3	1	2	0	0	2	–0.468	3rd	
2015–16	4	0	3	0	1	1	–1.587	5th	

== Honours ==
- National Women's Cricket Championship:
  - Winners (0):
  - Best finish: 3rd (2016)
- Women's Cricket Challenge Trophy
  - Winners (0):
  - Best finish: 3rd (2015–16)
