= Shamilia Connell =

Barbadian cricketer

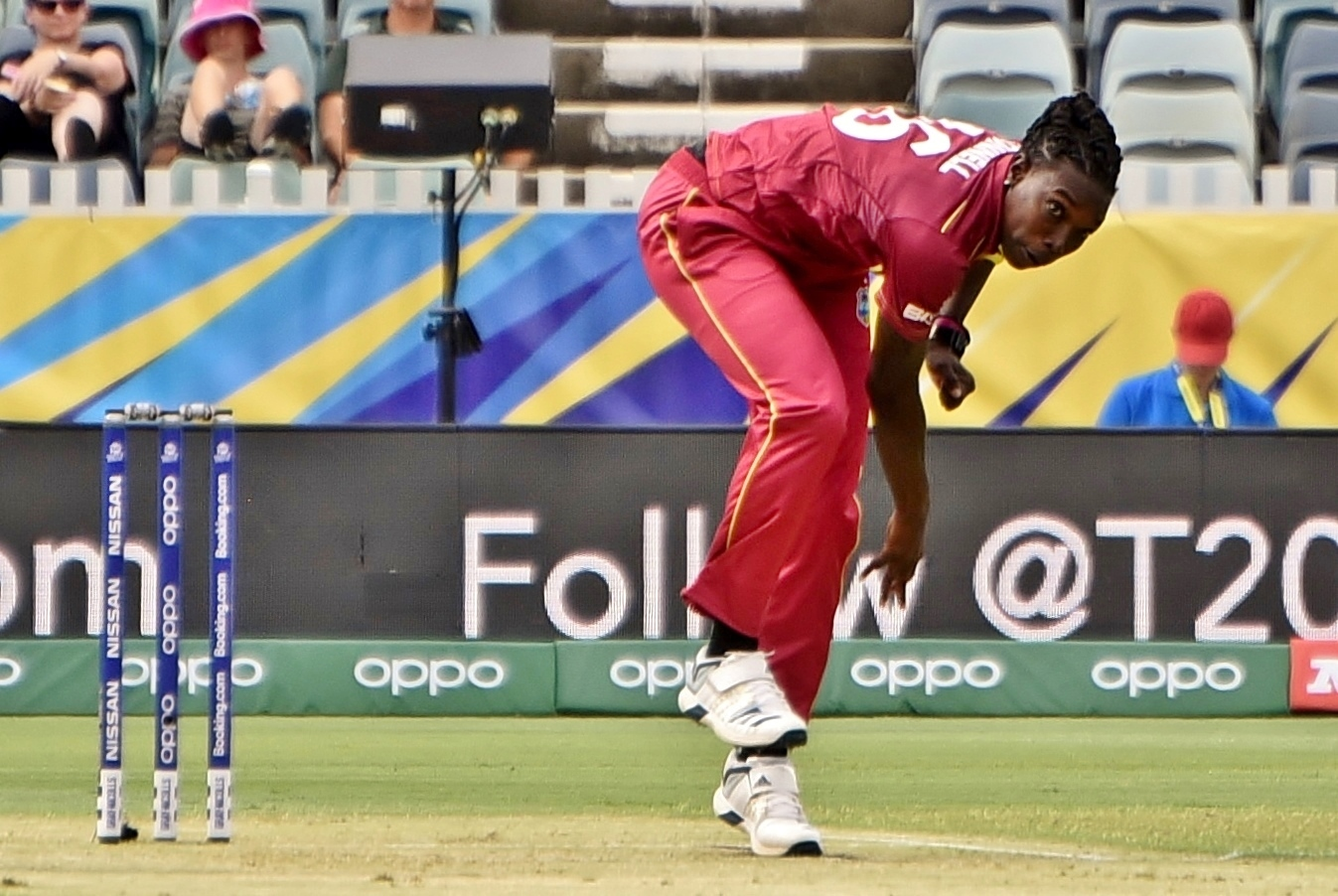
- Connell bowling for the West Indies during the 2020 ICC Women's T20 World Cup

Personal information
- Full name: Shamilia Shontell Connell
- Born: 14 July 1992 (age 34); Bridgetown, Barbados
- Batting: Right-handed
- Bowling: Right-arm fast
- Role: Bowler

International information
- National sides: West Indies (2014–present); Barbados (2022)
- ODI debut (cap 80): 11 November 2014; West Indies v Australia
- Last ODI: 21 June 2023; West Indies v Sri Lanka
- T20I debut (cap 33/3): 23 September 2014; West Indies v New Zealand
- Last T20I: 4 October 2024; West Indies v South Africa
- T20I shirt no.: 46

Domestic team information
- Years: Team
- 2010–present: Barbados
- 2022: Guyana Amazon Warriors
- 2023–present: Trinbago Knight Riders

Career statistics
Competition	WODI	WT20I
Matches	70	77
Runs scored	118	59
Batting average	6.55	9.83
100s/50s	0/0	0/0
Top score	15*	15
Balls bowled	2,500	1,335
Wickets	50	52
Bowling average	39.22	28.71
5 wickets in innings	0	0
10 wickets in match	0	0
Best bowling	4/54	3/14
Catches/stumpings	10/–	16/–
- Source: ESPNcricinfo, 16 October 2024

Shamilia Shontell Connell (born 14 July 1992) is a Barbadian cricketer who represents the West Indies internationally. A right-arm fast bowler, she made her international debut in 2014. She plays domestic cricket for Barbados and Guyana Amazon Warriors.

== Career ==
Connell made her international debut in September 2014, in a Twenty20 International against New Zealand. Her One Day International (ODI) debut came a few months later, against Australia. However, Connell did her take her first international wicket until October 2015, in an ODI series against Pakistan. She finished with six wickets, the most for her team, which including 3/32 in the fourth ODI. At the 2016 World Twenty20 in India, Connell was a member of the West Indian squad that won their first world title, featuring in all matches at the tournament. She has been compared to retired West Indian fast bowler Joel Garner, in that she is "tall, dangerously quick, and not scared to bowl bouncers".

In October 2018, Cricket West Indies (CWI) awarded her a women's contract for the 2018–19 season. Later the same month, she was named in the West Indies' squad for the 2018 ICC Women's World Twenty20 tournament in the West Indies. In January 2020, she was named in West Indies' squad for the 2020 ICC Women's T20 World Cup in Australia.

In May 2021, Connell was awarded with a central contract from Cricket West Indies. In June 2021, she was named in the West Indies' squad across all formats for their home series against Pakistan. She was the highest-wicket taker in the WT20I series picking up five wickets, and was awarded the player of the series.

In October 2021, she was named in the West Indies team for the 2021 Women's Cricket World Cup Qualifier tournament in Zimbabwe. In February 2022, she was named in the West Indies team for the 2022 Women's Cricket World Cup in New Zealand. On 18 March 2022, during the 47th over of the Bangladesh batting against the West Indies at the 2022 Women's Cricket World Cup she collapsed on the field while fielding at midwicket and was immediately taken to the hospital. She had only bowled three overs in the match by the time she collapsed during the course of the match. The very next day, she was discharged from the hospital and it was revealed that she had successfully recovered well in time.

In July 2022, she was named in the Barbados team for the cricket tournament at the 2022 Commonwealth Games in Birmingham, England.

She was named in the West Indies squad for the 2024 ICC Women's T20 World Cup.
