= Javeria Rauf =

Pakistani cricketer (born 1989)

Personal information
- Full name: Javeria Rauf
- Born: 10 April 1989 (age 37); Sindh, Pakistan
- Batting: Right-handed
- Bowling: Right-arm fast-medium
- Role: All-rounder

International information
- National side: Pakistan (2012–2021)
- ODI debut (cap 66): 10 July 2013 v Ireland
- Last ODI: 13 January 2014 v Ireland
- T20I debut (cap 27): 3 October 2012 v South Africa
- Last T20I: 2 July 2021 v West Indies

Domestic team information
- Years: Team
- 2011/12–2012/13: Sindh
- 2011/12–2014: Karachi
- 2014: Omar Associates
- 2015–2016: Zarai Taraqiati Bank Limited
- 2015/16: Saif Sports Saga
- 2017: Karachi
- 2018/19: State Bank of Pakistan

Career statistics
Competition	WODI	WT20I	WLA	WT20
Matches	4	13	62	61
Runs scored	31	137	1,608	934
Batting average	15.50	12.45	35.73	19.06
100s/50s	0/0	0/0	1/11	0/7
Top score	16	40*	120	60
Balls bowled	60	60	541	228
Wickets	1	4	12	13
Bowling average	55.00	16.00	26.25	17.84
5 wickets in innings	0	0	0	0
10 wickets in match	0	0	0	0
Best bowling	1/22	2/23	3/20	3/8
Catches/stumpings	0/–	3/–	19/–	17/–
- Source: CricketArchive, 6 January 2022

Javeria Rauf (جواریہ راوُف) (born 10 April 1989) is a Pakistani cricketer who plays as a right-handed batter and right-arm fast-medium bowler for Pakistan. She has also played domestic cricket for Sindh, Karachi, Omar Associates, Zarai Taraqiati Bank Limited, Saif Sports Saga and State Bank of Pakistan. On 8 January 2024, she announced her retirement from international cricket.

She was included in Pakistan's squad for 2013 Women's Cricket World Cup. In April 2019, after last appearing in a Women's One Day International (WODI) match for Pakistan in 2014, she was named in the squad for the series against South Africa. In June 2021, she was named in Pakistan's squad for their series against the West Indies.
