= Natalia Pervaiz =

Pakistani cricketer

Personal information
- Born: 25 December 1995 (age 30); Bandala, Azad Kashmir, Pakistan
- Batting: Right-handed
- Bowling: Right-arm medium
- Role: All-rounder

International information
- National side: Pakistan (2017–present)
- ODI debut (cap 77): 20 March 2018 v Sri Lanka
- Last ODI: 5 October 2025 v India
- ODI shirt no.: 99
- T20I debut (cap 39): 9 November 2017 v New Zealand
- Last T20I: 10 August 2025 v Ireland

Domestic team information
- Years: Team
- 2014–2017: Higher Education Commission
- 2014: Hyderabad
- 2015/16–2018/19: State Bank of Pakistan

Career statistics
Competition	WODI	WT20I	WLA
Matches	12	24	59
Runs scored	222	156	922
Batting average	27.75	9.17	27.11
100s/50s	0/1	0/0	0/3
Top score	73	31	67*
Balls bowled	90	90	1,687
Wickets	1	6	40
Bowling average	83.00	19.83	27.05
5 wickets in innings	0	0	0
10 wickets in match	0	0	0
Best bowling	1/42	3/20	4/27
Catches/stumpings	0/–	4/–	21/–
- Source: ESPNcricinfo, 3 October 2025

Natalia Pervaiz (born 25 December 1995) is a Pakistani cricketer who plays as a right-arm medium bowler and right-handed batter. She has played domestic cricket for Higher Education Commission, Hyderabad and State Bank of Pakistan.

She made her T20I debut against New Zealand on 9 November 2017. She made her ODI debut against Sri Lanka Women on 20 March 2018.

She was part of Pakistan's squad at the 2018 ICC Women's T20I World Cup and the 2025 Women's Cricket World Cup.
