= Rameen Shamim =

Pakistani cricketer

Personal information
- Full name: Rameen Shamim
- Born: 19 January 1996 (age 30); Karachi, Pakistan
- Batting: Left-handed
- Bowling: Right-arm off break
- Role: Bowler

International information
- National side: Pakistan
- ODI debut (cap 82): 9 December 2019 v England
- Last ODI: 12 July 2021 v West Indies
- ODI shirt no.: 15
- T20I debut (cap 44): 18 May 2019 v South Africa
- Last T20I: 23 May 2019 v South Africa

Domestic team information
- Years: Team
- 2011/12–2014: Karachi
- 2012/13: Sindh
- 2014: Omar Associates
- 2015–2016: Saif Sports Saga
- 2017: Karachi

Career statistics
Competition	WODI	WT20I	WLA	WT20
Matches	3	4	52	41
Runs scored	25	–	450	141
Batting average	25.00	–	14.06	17.62
100s/50s	0/0	–	0/0	0/0
Top score	25*	–	39*	21*
Balls bowled	111	79	2,388	895
Wickets	3	1	62	28
Bowling average	43.00	95.00	21.25	28.71
5 wickets in innings	0	0	0	0
10 wickets in match	0	0	0	0
Best bowling	3/61	1/20	4/12	2/10
Catches/stumpings	0/–	2/–	16/–	8/–
- Source: CricketArchive, 6 January 2022

Rameen Shamim (born 19 January 1996) is a Pakistani cricketer who plays as a right-arm off break bowler for Pakistan. Shamim, who bats left-handed, has played domestic cricket for Karachi, Sindh, Omar Associates and Saif Sports Saga. In April 2019, she was named in Pakistan's squad for their series against South Africa. She made her Women's Twenty20 International (WT20I) debut for Pakistan against South Africa on 18 May 2019. In November 2019, she was named in Pakistan's squad for their series against England in Malaysia. She made her Women's One Day International (WODI) debut, also against England, on 9 December 2019.

In June 2021, Shamim was named as the captain of Pakistan women's A Team for their one-day matches against the West Indies. In October 2021, she was named in Pakistan's team for the 2021 Women's Cricket World Cup Qualifier tournament in Zimbabwe.

Shamim was part of the Pakistan squad for the 2025 Women's Cricket World Cup Qualifier at home in April 2025.
