= Balochistan women's cricket team =

Pakistani women's cricket team

Balochistan Women
Personnel
- Captain: Nahida Khan

Team information
- Founded: Unknown First recorded match: 2012

History
- WCCT wins: 0

The Balochistan women's cricket team is the women's representative cricket team for the Pakistani province of Balochistan. They competed in the Women's Cricket Challenge Trophy's first two seasons, in 2011–12 and 2012–13.

== History ==
In both the Twenty20 Women's Cricket Challenge Trophy seasons that Balochistan competed in, they finished second in their group, winning one match and losing one match in each edition of the tournaments.

== Players ==
=== Notable players ===
The players who have played for both Balochistan and for Pakistan internationally are listed below, in order of first international appearance (given in brackets):

- (Pakistan) Sajjida Shah (2000)
- (Pakistan) Armaan Khan (2005)
- (Pakistan) Sabahat Rasheed (2005)
- (Pakistan) Almas Akram (2008)
- (Pakistan) Nahida Khan (2009)
- (Pakistan) Sukhan Faiz (2009)
- (Pakistan) Shumaila Qureshi (2010)
- (Pakistan) Elizebath Khan (2012)
- (Pakistan) Muneeba Ali (2016)
- (Pakistan) Omaima Sohail (2018)
- (Pakistan) Saba Nazir (2019)

== Seasons ==
=== Women's Cricket Challenge Trophy ===
Season	Division	League standings								Notes
Season	Division	P	W	L	T	A/C	Pts	NRR	Pos	Notes
2011–12	Pool B	2	1	1	0	0	2	+0.114	2nd	
2012–13	Group A	2	1	1	0	0	2	+0.100	2nd	

== See also ==
- Balochistan cricket team
