= Fareeha Mehmood =

Pakistani cricketer (born 1994)

Personal information
- Full name: Fareeha Mehmood
- Born: 19 February 1994 (age 32); Lahore, Pakistan
- Batting: Left-handed
- Role: Wicket-keeper

International information
- National side: Pakistan
- T20I debut (cap 41): 28 March 2018 v Sri Lanka
- Last T20I: 31 March 2018 v Sri Lanka

Domestic team information
- Years: Team
- 2011/12–2012/13: Federal Capital
- 2012/13–2014: Higher Education Commission
- 2014: Lahore
- 2015: Omar Associates
- 2015/16–2016: State Bank of Pakistan
- 2017: Higher Education Commission
- 2018/19: State Bank of Pakistan

Career statistics
Competition	WT20I	WLA	WT20
Matches	3	47	34
Runs scored	7	686	236
Batting average	3.50	20.78	14.75
100s/50s	0/0	0/1	0/0
Top score	5	55*	40
Catches/stumpings	1/0	34/16	14/13
- Source: CricketArchive, 3 January 2022

Fareeha Mehmood (born 19 February 1994) is a Pakistani cricketer who plays as a wicket-keeper and left-handed batter. She made her Twenty20 International debut for Pakistan against Sri Lanka on 28 March 2018.

She completed the ACC Level 1 women's coaching course, organised by the Pakistan Cricket Board, in October 2019.
