= Ayesha Zafar =

Pakistani cricketer (born 1994)

Personal information
- Full name: Ayesha Zafar
- Born: 9 July 1994 (age 32); Sialkot, Pakistan
- Batting: Right-handed
- Bowling: Right-arm leg break
- Role: Batter

International information
- National side: Pakistan (2015–present)
- ODI debut (cap 72): 24 October 2015 v West Indies
- Last ODI: 21 November 2021 v Bangladesh
- T20I debut (cap 34): 29 October 2015 v West Indies
- Last T20I: 3 February 2021 v South Africa

Domestic team information
- Years: Team
- 2009/10–2012/13: Karachi
- 2011/12–2012/13: Sindh
- 2014–2015: Saif Sports Saga
- 2015/16–2018/19: State Bank of Pakistan

Career statistics
| Competition | WODI | WT20I | WLA | WT20 |
|---|---|---|---|---|
| Matches | 29 | 20 | 84 | 56 |
| Runs scored | 481 | 176 | 1,824 | 699 |
| Batting average | 17.17 | 8.80 | 23.38 | 14.87 |
| 100s/50s | 0/3 | 0/0 | 1/10 | 0/2 |
| Top score | 56* | 28 | 118 | 65 |
| Balls bowled | – | – | 186 | 30 |
| Wickets | – | – | 5 | 2 |
| Bowling average | – | – | 23.80 | 14.00 |
| 5 wickets in innings | – | – | 0 | 0 |
| 10 wickets in match | – | – | 0 | 0 |
| Best bowling | – | – | 1/7 | 1/9 |
| Catches/stumpings | 4/– | 3/– | 14/– | 9/– |
- Source: CricketArchive, 6 January 2022

Ayesha Zafar (born 9 September 1994) is a Pakistani cricketer who plays as a right-handed batter for Pakistan. She has also played domestic cricket for Karachi, Sindh, Saif Sports Saga and State Bank of Pakistan.

In October 2018, she was named in Pakistan's squad for the 2018 ICC Women's World Twenty20 tournament in the West Indies. In October 2021, she was named in Pakistan's team for the 2021 Women's Cricket World Cup Qualifier tournament in Zimbabwe.
