= Zarai Taraqiati Bank Limited women's cricket team =

Pakistani women's cricket team

Zarai Taraqiati Bank Limited Women
Personnel
- Captain: Sana Mir

Team information
- Founded: Unknown First recorded match: 2010

History
- NWCC wins: 7
- WCCT wins: 5
- DT20 wins: 2

The Zarai Taraqiati Bank Limited women's cricket team is a Pakistani women's cricket team, sponsored by the Zarai Taraqiati Bank Limited. They competed in the National Women's Cricket Championship, the Women's Cricket Challenge Trophy and the Departmental T20 Women's Championship between 2009–10 and 2018–19. They were the most successful side in all three competitions, winning every tournament they competed in, with 14 titles overall.

== History ==
Zarai Taraqiati Bank Limited first competed in the National Women's Cricket Championship in 2009–10, winning every match in the group stages before beating Karachi in the final to claim their first title. Zarai Taraqiati Bank Limited went on to win every subsequent edition of this championship that they competed in, in 2010–11, 2011–12, 2012–13, 2015, 2016 and 2017, without losing a match.

Zarai Taraqiati Bank Limited also competed in the Twenty20 Women's Cricket Challenge Trophy between 2011–12 and 2016–17. The side also won each edition of this tournament that they competed in, again without losing a match. However, the title in 2014 was shared with Omar Associates after the final was curtailed due to rain.

The side also competed in the Departmental T20 Women's Championship in 2018 and 2018–19. They won both editions of the tournament, but did lose their only ever match during the 2018–19 season, losing to State Bank of Pakistan by 5 wickets.

== Players ==
=== Notable players ===
Players who played for Zarai Taraqiati Bank Limited and played internationally are listed below, in order of first international appearance (given in brackets):

- (Pakistan) Nazia Sadiq (1997)
- (Pakistan) Sajjida Shah (2000)
- (Pakistan) Batool Fatima (2001)
- (Pakistan) Urooj Mumtaz (2004)
- (Pakistan) Asmavia Iqbal (2005)
- (Pakistan) Qanita Jalil (2005)
- (Pakistan) Sana Mir (2005)
- (Pakistan) Bismah Maroof (2006)
- (Pakistan) Nain Abidi (2006)
- (Pakistan) Sadia Yousuf (2008)
- (Pakistan) Almas Akram (2008)
- (Pakistan) Javeria Khan (2008)
- (Pakistan) Nahida Khan (2009)
- (Pakistan) Sania Khan (2009)
- (Pakistan) Marina Iqbal (2009)
- (Pakistan) Nida Dar (2010)
- (Pakistan) Rabiya Shah (2010)
- (Pakistan) Kanwal Naz (2010)
- (Pakistan) Mariam Hasan (2010)
- (Pakistan) Kainat Imtiaz (2010)
- (Pakistan) Masooma Junaid (2011)
- (Pakistan) Javeria Rauf (2012)
- (Pakistan) Anam Amin (2014)
- (Pakistan) Maham Tariq (2014)
- (Pakistan) Sidra Nawaz (2014)
- (Pakistan) Aliya Riaz (2014)
- (Pakistan) Diana Baig (2015)
- (Pakistan) Muneeba Ali (2016)
- (Pakistan) Aiman Anwer (2016)
- (Pakistan) Nashra Sandhu (2017)
- (Pakistan) Omaima Sohail (2018)
- (Pakistan) Fatima Sana (2019)

== Seasons ==
=== National Women's Cricket Championship ===
Season	Division	League standings								Notes
Season	Division	P	W	L	T	A/C	Pts	NRR	Pos	Notes
2009–10	Zone A	4	4	0	0	0	16	+5.864	1st	Champions
2010–11	Zone C	3	3	0	0	0	12	+4.796	1st	Champions
2011–12	Zone B	4	4	0	0	0	16	+5.611	1st	Champions
2012–13	Pool A	6	6	0	0	0	12	+5.200	1st	Champions
2015	Super League	5	5	0	0	0	10	+3.709	1st	Champions
2016	Super League	5	5	0	0	0	10	+5.824	1st	Champions
2017	Pool B	3	3	0	0	0	6	+1.454	1st	Champions

=== Women's Cricket Challenge Trophy ===
Season	Division	League standings								Notes
Season	Division	P	W	L	T	A/C	Pts	NRR	Pos	Notes
2011–12	Pool B	2	2	0	0	0	4	+3.268	1st	Champions
2012–13	Group B	2	2	0	0	0	4	+4.519	1st	Champions
2014	League	3	3	0	0	0	6	+1.947	1st	Champions
2015–16	League	4	3	0	0	1	7	+1.533	1st	Champions
2016–17	League	3	3	0	0	0	6	+1.620	1st	Champions

=== Departmental T20 Women's Championship ===
Season	League standings								Notes
Season	P	W	L	T	A/C	Pts	NRR	Pos	Notes
2018	6	6	0	0	0	12	+2.075	1st	Champions
2018–19	6	5	1	0	0	10	+2.774	1st	Champions

== Honours ==
- National Women's Cricket Championship:
  - Winners (7): 2009–10, 2010–11, 2011–12, 2012–13, 2015, 2016 & 2017
- Women's Cricket Challenge Trophy
  - Winners (5): 2011–12, 2012–13, 2014, 2015–16 & 2016–17
- Departmental T20 Women's Championship
  - Winners (2): 2018 & 2018–19

== See also ==
- Zarai Taraqiati Bank Limited cricket team
