= Omaima Sohail =

Pakistani cricketer

Personal information
- Born: 11 July 1997 (age 29); Karachi, Sindh, Pakistan
- Batting: Right-handed
- Bowling: Right-arm off break
- Role: All-rounder

International information
- National side: Pakistan (2018–present)
- ODI debut (cap 78): 8 October 2018 v Bangladesh
- Last ODI: 21 January 2023 v Australia
- T20I debut (cap 42): 25 October 2018 v Australia
- Last T20I: 21 February 2023 v England
- T20I shirt no.: 11

Domestic team information
- Years: Team
- 2011/12: Balochistan
- 2012/13: Khyber Pakhtunkhwa
- 2012/13–2014: Karachi
- 2014: Omar Associates
- 2015–2016: Zarai Taraqiati Bank Limited
- 2018/19: State Bank of Pakistan

Career statistics
Competition	WODI	WT20I	WLA	WT20
Matches	28	26	65	61
Runs scored	574	315	1,269	775
Batting average	22.96	13.69	22.26	16.48
100s/50s	0/3	0/0	0/7	0/2
Top score	65	43	73	62
Balls bowled	461	48	957	228
Wickets	12	1	28	8
Bowling average	29.08	56.00	22.57	33.12
5 wickets in innings	0	0	0	0
10 wickets in match	0	0	0	0
Best bowling	2/7	1/18	4/24	2/21
Catches/stumpings	6/–	7/–	22/–	19/–
- Source: CricketArchive, 21 February 2023

Omaima Sohail (born 11 July 1997) is a Pakistani cricketer who plays for the Pakistan national team as a right-arm off break bowler and right-handed batter. She has played domestic cricket for Balochistan, Khyber Pakhtunkhwa, Karachi, Omar Associates, Zarai Taraqiati Bank Limited and State Bank of Pakistan.

In September 2018, she was named in Pakistan's squad for their series against Bangladesh. She made her Women's One Day International (WODI) debut for Pakistan against Bangladesh on 8 October 2018. Prior to her full international debut, she was named in Pakistan's squad for the 2018 Women's Twenty20 Asia Cup, but was not picked for a match during the tournament.

In October 2018, she was named in Pakistan's squad for the 2018 ICC Women's World Twenty20 tournament in the West Indies. Later the same month, she made her Women's Twenty20 International (WT20I) debut for Pakistan Women against Australia on 25 October 2018. In January 2020, she was named in Pakistan's squad for the 2020 ICC Women's T20 World Cup in Australia. In October 2021, she was named in Pakistan's team for the 2021 Women's Cricket World Cup Qualifier tournament in Zimbabwe. In January 2022, she was named in Pakistan's team for the 2022 Women's Cricket World Cup in New Zealand. In May 2022, she was named in Pakistan's team for the cricket tournament at the 2022 Commonwealth Games in Birmingham, England.

She was named in the Pakistan squad for the 2024 ICC Women's T20 World Cup.

Sohail was part of the Pakistan squad for the 2025 Women's Cricket World Cup Qualifier at home in April 2025.
