= Marina Iqbal =

Pakistani cricketer and commentator

Personal information
- Born: 7 March 1987 (age 39); Quetta, Pakistan
- Batting: Right-handed
- Bowling: Right-arm medium-fast
- Role: Bowler

International information
- National side: Pakistan (2009–2017)
- ODI debut (cap 55): 26 May 2009 v Ireland
- Last ODI: 8 July 2017 v New Zealand
- T20I debut (cap 5): 25 May 2009 v Ireland
- Last T20I: 1 November 2015 v West Indies

Domestic team information
- Years: Team
- 2005/06–2007/08: Lahore
- 2009/10–2011/12: Zarai Taraqiati Bank Limited
- 2012/13–2014: Lahore
- 2012/13: Punjab
- 2014: Zarai Taraqiati Bank Limited
- 2015–2015/16: Omar Associates
- 2016: Saif Sports Saga
- 2017: State Bank of Pakistan

Career statistics
Competition	WODI	WT20I	WLA	WT20
Matches	36	42	95	83
Runs scored	436	340	1,805	927
Batting average	15.03	10.30	26.15	14.71
100s/50s	0/1	0/0	2/10	0/1
Top score	69	42	114	53*
Balls bowled	448	84	1,030	309
Wickets	8	2	35	10
Bowling average	37.37	52.50	19.74	32.40
5 wickets in innings	0	0	0	0
10 wickets in match	0	0	0	0
Best bowling	2/12	1/2	4/4	3/14
Catches/stumpings	14/–	16/–	38/–	29/–
Medal record
Representing Pakistan
Women's Cricket
Asian Games
Gold medal – first place	2010 Guangzhou	Team
Gold medal – first place	2014 Incheon	Team
- Source: CricketArchive, 7 January 2022

Marina Iqbal (born 7 March 1987) is a Pakistani cricket commentator and former cricketer. She played as a right-arm medium-fast bowler and right-handed batter. She appeared in 36 One Day Internationals and 42 Twenty20 Internationals for Pakistan between 2009 and 2017. She played domestic cricket for Lahore, Zarai Taraqiati Bank Limited, Punjab, Omar Associates, Saif Sports Saga and State Bank of Pakistan.

== Career ==
Iqbal made her One Day International and Twenty20 International debuts against Ireland in May 2009 at Dublin.

Marina was part of the cricket gold medal-winning Pakistan team at the 2010 Asian Games in China.
