= Anam Amin =

Pakistani cricketer

Personal information
- Full name: Anam Amin
- Born: 11 August 1992 (age 34); Lahore, Pakistan
- Batting: Left-handed
- Bowling: Slow left-arm orthodox
- Role: Bowler

International information
- National side: Pakistan (2014–present)
- ODI debut (cap 67): 6 March 2014 v Bangladesh
- Last ODI: 5 June 2022 v Sri Lanka
- T20I debut (cap 29): 8 March 2014 v Bangladesh
- Last T20I: 31 July 2022 v India

Domestic team information
- Years: Team
- 2012/13: Punjab
- 2014: Higher Education Commission
- 2014: Lahore
- 2015: Zarai Taraqiati Bank Limited
- 2015/16–2018/19: State Bank of Pakistan

Career statistics
Competition	WODI	WT20I	WLA	WT20
Matches	29	57	70	90
Runs scored	16	3	53	15
Batting average	1.77	3.00	2.78	3.75
100s/50s	0/0	0/0	0/0	0/0
Top score	3*	2*	8*	8
Balls bowled	1,384	1,262	3,434	1,993
Wickets	44	57	105	89
Bowling average	18.47	20.01	15.92	20.01
5 wickets in innings	1	0	2	0
10 wickets in match	0	0	0	0
Best bowling	5/35	4/16	5/25	4/16
Catches/stumpings	4/–	9/–	11/–	11/–
Medal record
Representing Pakistan
Women's Cricket
Asian Games
Gold medal – first place	2014 Incheon	Team
- Source: CricketArchive, 31 July 2022

Anam Amin (born 11 August 1992) is a Pakistani cricketer who plays for Pakistan as a slow left-arm orthodox bowler. She has also played domestic cricket for Punjab, Higher Education Commission, Lahore, Zarai Taraqiati Bank Limited and State Bank of Pakistan.

Anam is an Asian Games champion cricketer. She was a member of the gold medal-winning Pakistan team at the 2014 Asian Games.

In October 2018, she was named in Pakistan's squad for the 2018 ICC Women's World Twenty20 tournament in the West Indies. Ahead of the tournament, she was named as one of the players to watch. In January 2020, she was named in Pakistan's squad for the 2020 ICC Women's T20 World Cup in Australia. In October 2021, she was named in Pakistan's team for the 2021 Women's Cricket World Cup Qualifier tournament in Zimbabwe. The following month, in Pakistan's opening match against the West Indies, she took her first five-wicket haul in WODIs.

In January 2022, she was named in Pakistan's team for the 2022 Women's Cricket World Cup in New Zealand. In May 2022, she was named in Pakistan's team for the cricket tournament at the 2022 Commonwealth Games in Birmingham, England.
