= Sadia Yousuf =

Pakistani cricketer (born 1989)

Personal information
- Full name: Sadia Yousuf
- Born: 4 November 1989 (age 37); Pakistan
- Batting: Right-handed
- Bowling: Slow left-arm orthodox
- Role: Bowler

International information
- National side: Pakistan (2008–2017)
- ODI debut (cap 48): 18 February 2008 v Ireland
- Last ODI: 5 November 2017 v New Zealand
- T20I debut (cap 17): 10 May 2010 v New Zealand
- Last T20I: 12 November 2017 v New Zealand

Domestic team information
- Years: Team
- 2004/05–2007/08: Faisalabad
- 2009/10: Zarai Taraqiati Bank Limited
- 2010/11: Faisalabad
- 2011/12–2014: Zarai Taraqiati Bank Limited
- 2014: Faisalabad
- 2015–2015/16: Omar Associates
- 2016/17–2018/19: State Bank of Pakistan

Career statistics
Competition	WODI	WT20I	WLA	WT20
Matches	58	51	112	95
Runs scored	36	14	123	33
Batting average	2.25	1.40	3.41	2.20
100s/50s	0/0	0/0	0/0	0/0
Top score	10*	3	13	5
Balls bowled	2,772	1,048	4,990	1,940
Wickets	76	57	161	103
Bowling average	22.97	17.82	17.15	15.64
5 wickets in innings	1	0	3	1
10 wickets in match	0	0	0	0
Best bowling	5/35	4/9	6/2	6/10
Catches/stumpings	7/–	2/–	18/–	11/–
Medal record
Representing Pakistan
Women's Cricket
Asian Games
Gold medal – first place	2014 Incheon	Team
- Source: CricketArchive, 1 January 2022

Sadia Yousuf (born 4 November 1989) is a Pakistani former cricketer who played as a slow left-arm orthodox bowler. She appeared in 58 One Day Internationals and 51 Twenty20 Internationals for Pakistan between 2008 and 2017. She played domestic cricket for Faisalabad, Zarai Taraqiati Bank Limited, Omar Associates and State Bank of Pakistan.

== International career ==
She made her One Day International debut against Ireland on 8 February 2008.

She made her Twenty20 International debut for Pakistan Women against New Zealand Women on 10 May 2010.

In terms of silverware, she was a member of the gold medal-winning Pakistan team at the 2014 Asian Games. In the tournament final against Bangladesh, she took two wickets in her only over of the match, conceding only two runs.
