= Sidra Nawaz =

Pakistani cricketer

Personal information
- Full name: Sidra Nawaz
- Born: 14 March 1994 (age 32); Lahore, Punjab, Pakistan
- Batting: Right-handed
- Role: Wicket-keeper

International information
- National side: Pakistan (2014–present)
- ODI debut (cap 69): 21 August 2014 v Australia
- Last ODI: 18 January 2023 v Australia
- ODI shirt no.: 22
- T20I debut (cap 31): 30 August 2014 v Australia
- Last T20I: 21 February 2023 v England

Domestic team information
- Years: Team
- 2010/11–2014: Lahore
- 2011/12: Federal Capital
- 2012/13: Punjab
- 2014–2015: Higher Education Commission
- 2015/16: Omar Associates
- 2016: Saif Sports Saga
- 2016/17–2017: State Bank of Pakistan
- 2018–2018/19: Zarai Taraqiati Bank Limited

Career statistics
| Competition | WODI | WT20I | WLA | WT20 |
|---|---|---|---|---|
| Matches | 50 | 54 | 108 | 102 |
| Runs scored | 252 | 174 | 1,086 | 383 |
| Batting average | 7.87 | 8.28 | 14.67 | 9.34 |
| 100s/50s | 0/0 | 0/0 | 1/2 | 0/0 |
| Top score | 47 | 22 | 104 | 22 |
| Catches/stumpings | 29/11 | 17/27 | 69/30 | 37/67 |
Medal record
Representing Pakistan
Women's Cricket
Asian Games
| Gold medal – first place | 2014 Incheon | Team |
- Source: CricketArchive, 21 February 2023

Sidra Nawaz Bhatti (born 14 March 1994) is a Pakistani cricketer who plays as a wicket-keeper and right-handed batter for Pakistan. She made her international debut against Australia on 21 August 2014 in a Twenty20 International. She has also played domestic cricket for Lahore, Federal Capital, Punjab, Higher Education Commission, Omar Associates, Saif Sports Saga, State Bank of Pakistan and Zarai Taraqiati Bank Limited.

She was a member of the gold medal-winning Pakistan team at the 2014 Asian Games.

In October 2018, she was named in Pakistan's squad for the 2018 ICC Women's World Twenty20 tournament in the West Indies. In January 2020, she was named in Pakistan's squad for the 2020 ICC Women's T20 World Cup in Australia.

In June 2021, Nawaz was named as the captain of Pakistan women's A Team for their 20-over matches against the West Indies. In October 2021, she was named in Pakistan's team for the 2021 Women's Cricket World Cup Qualifier tournament in Zimbabwe. In January 2022, she was named in Pakistan's team for the 2022 Women's Cricket World Cup in New Zealand.

Nawaz was part of the Pakistan squad for the 2025 Women's Cricket World Cup Qualifier at home in April 2025.
