= Asmavia Iqbal =

Pakistani cricketer (born 1988)

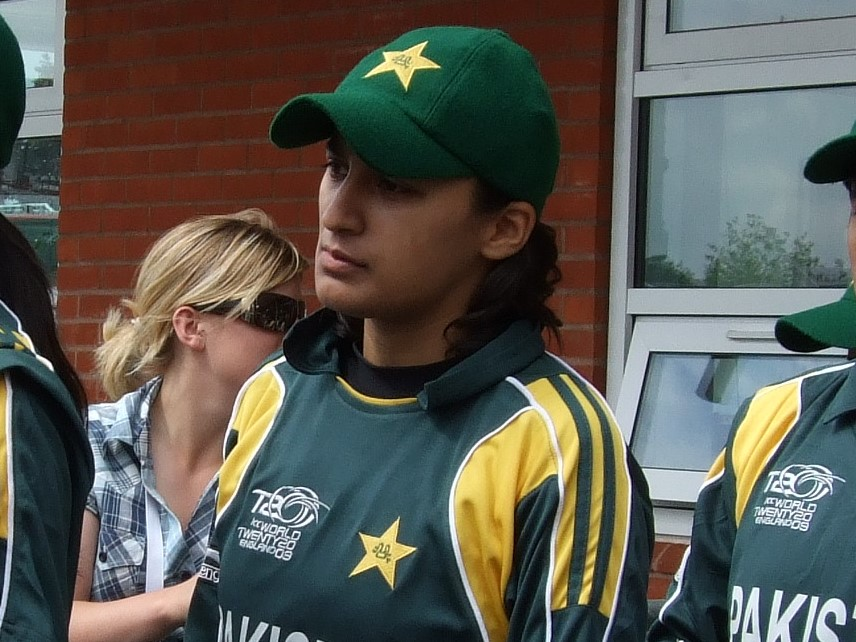
- Asmavia Iqbal in 2009

Personal information
- Full name: Asmavia Iqbal Khokhar
- Born: 1 January 1987 (age 39); Multan, Punjab, Pakistan
- Batting: Right-handed
- Bowling: Right-arm medium-fast
- Role: Bowler

International information
- National side: Pakistan (2005–2017)
- ODI debut (cap 37): 28 December 2005 v Sri Lanka
- Last ODI: 15 July 2017 v New Zealand
- T20I debut (cap 2): 25 May 2009 v Ireland
- Last T20I: 4 December 2016 v India

Domestic team information
- Years: Team
- 2004/05–2007/08: Multan
- 2009/10–2014: Zarai Taraqiati Bank Limited
- 2014: Multan
- 2015–2015/16: Omar Associates
- 2016: Saif Sports Saga
- 2016/17–2017: State Bank of Pakistan

Career statistics
Competition	WODI	WT20I	WLA	WT20
Matches	92	68	162	102
Runs scored	922	421	2,070	939
Batting average	15.89	10.02	22.02	15.65
100s/50s	0/0	0/0	1/7	0/2
Top score	49*	35	141	91
Balls bowled	3,264	1,005	5,936	1,629
Wickets	70	44	172	80
Bowling average	36.20	22.75	23.54	19.21
5 wickets in innings	0	0	3	1
10 wickets in match	0	0	0	0
Best bowling	3/15	4/16	6/28	5/8
Catches/stumpings	21/–	18/–	49/–	28/–
Medal record
Representing Pakistan
Women's Cricket
Asian Games
Gold medal – first place	2010 Guangzhou	Team
Gold medal – first place	2014 Incheon	Team
- Source: CricketArchive, 4 January 2022

Asmavia Iqbal Khokhar (born 1 January 1988) is a Pakistani former cricketer who played primarily as a right-arm medium fast bowler. She appeared in 92 One Day Internationals and 68 Twenty20 Internationals for Pakistan between 2005 and 2017. She was the first cricketer to take a hat-trick in a WT20I, achieving the feat against England in 2012. She played domestic cricket for Multan, Zarai Taraqiati Bank Limited, Omar Associates, Saif Sports Saga and State Bank of Pakistan.

== Career ==
Iqbal made her One Day International debut against Sri Lanka at the National Stadium in Karachi on 28 December 2005.

She was part of the team at the ICC Women's Cricket World Cup in 2009 and 2017. Iqbal was selected to play in the 2010 Asian Games in China. She was part of the Pakistan side that won the Asian women's cricket gold medal at the 2010 Asian Games, in China.
