= Nashra Sandhu =

Pakistani cricketer

Personal information
- Full name: Nashra Sandhu
- Born: 19 November 1997 (age 28); Lahore, Pakistan
- Batting: Right-handed
- Bowling: Slow left-arm orthodox
- Role: Bowler

International information
- National side: Pakistan (2017–present)
- ODI debut (cap 74): 7 February 2017 v South Africa
- Last ODI: 21 October 2025 v South Africa
- T20I debut (cap 38): 9 November 2017 v New Zealand
- Last T20I: 29 October 2023 v Bangladesh
- T20I shirt no.: 6

Domestic team information
- Years: Team
- 2014: Abbottabad
- 2015–2016: Saif Sports Saga
- 2015/16: Omar Associates
- 2016/17–2018/19: Higher Education Commission
- 2018: Zarai Taraqiati Bank Limited

Career statistics
Competition	WODI	WT20I
Matches	48	28
Runs scored	64	7
Batting average	4.57	1.75
100s/50s	0/0	0/0
Top score	11*	3*
Balls bowled	2,455	590
Wickets	62	23
Bowling average	27.51	24.78
5 wickets in innings	0	0
10 wickets in match	0	0
Best bowling	4/26	2/7
Catches/stumpings	17/–	3/–
- Source: CricketArchive, 21 February 2023

Nashra Sandhu (born 19 November 1997) is a Pakistani cricketer who plays as a slow left-arm orthodox bowler.

== International career ==
She made her Women's One Day International cricket (WODI) debut against South Africa in the 2017 Women's Cricket World Cup Qualifier on 7 February 2017. In the match against India during the 2017 Women's Cricket World Cup, she took 4 wickets for 26 runs in 10 overs. Nashra ended up as the top wicket-taker in the tournament, with 17 wickets at an average of 11.05.

She made her Women's T20 International cricket (WT20I) debut against New Zealand on 9 November 2017.

In October 2018, she was named in Pakistan's squad for the 2018 ICC Women's World Twenty20 tournament in the West Indies. In October 2021, she was named in Pakistan's team for the 2021 Women's Cricket World Cup Qualifier tournament in Zimbabwe. In January 2022, she was named in Pakistan's team for the 2022 Women's Cricket World Cup in New Zealand.

Nashra reached a career-best 5th ranking in the ICC Women's T20I Bowlers Rankings in November 2023.

She was in the Pakistan squad for the 2024 ICC Women's T20 World Cup.

Sandhu was part of the Pakistan squad for the 2025 Women's Cricket World Cup Qualifier at home in April 2025.
