= Aiman Anwer =

Pakistani cricketer

Personal information
- Full name: Aiman Anwer
- Born: 14 September 1991 (age 35); Karachi, Pakistan
- Batting: Right-handed
- Bowling: Right-arm medium-fast
- Role: Bowler

International information
- National side: Pakistan (2016–present)
- ODI debut (cap 75): 8 February 2017 v Bangladesh
- Last ODI: 24 March 2022 v England
- T20I debut (cap 37): 5 July 2016 v England
- Last T20I: 19 February 2023 v West Indies

Domestic team information
- Years: Team
- 2009/10–2014: Karachi
- 2011/12–2012/13: Sindh
- 2014–2015/16: Saif Sports Saga
- 2016–2017: Zarai Taraqiati Bank Limited

Career statistics
Competition	WODI	WT20I	WLA	WT20
Matches	8	22	55	49
Runs scored	15	28	604	191
Batting average	3.75	4.66	18.87	12.73
100s/50s	0/0	0/0	0/3	0/0
Top score	10	6	57	36*
Balls bowled	264	456	2,005	930
Wickets	4	23	54	45
Bowling average	45.50	22.13	21.37	22.95
5 wickets in innings	0	0	0	0
10 wickets in match	0	0	0	0
Best bowling	1/13	3/30	4/3	4/11
Catches/stumpings	0/–	6/–	22/–	13/–
- Source: CricketArchive, 12 February 2023

Aiman Anwer (born 14 September 1991) is a Pakistani cricketer who plays primarily as a right-arm medium-fast bowler for Pakistan. She has also played domestic cricket for Karachi, Sindh, Saif Sports Saga and Zarai Taraqiati Bank Limited.

== International career ==
On 5 July 2016 Aiman made her Women's Twenty20 International (WT20I) debut during Pakistan's tour of England. She made her Women's One Day International (WODI) debut against Bangladesh in the 2017 Women's Cricket World Cup Qualifier on 8 February 2017.

In October 2018, she was named in Pakistan's squad for the 2018 ICC Women's World Twenty20 tournament in the West Indies. In January 2020, she was named in Pakistan's squad for the 2020 ICC Women's T20 World Cup in Australia. In October 2021, she was named in Pakistan's team for the 2021 Women's Cricket World Cup Qualifier tournament in Zimbabwe. In January 2022, she was named in Pakistan's team for the 2022 Women's Cricket World Cup in New Zealand. In May 2022, she was named in Pakistan's team for the cricket tournament at the 2022 Commonwealth Games in Birmingham, England.
