= Sumaiya Siddiqi =

Pakistani cricketer (born 1988)

Personal information
- Full name: Sumaiya Siddiqi
- Born: 30 November 1988 (age 37); Karachi, Pakistan
- Batting: Right-handed
- Bowling: Right-arm medium
- Role: Bowler

International information
- National side: Pakistan (2007–2015)
- ODI debut (cap 47): 26 January 2007 v South Africa
- Last ODI: 24 October 2015 v West Indies
- T20I debut (cap 26): 27 September 2012 v England
- Last T20I: 1 October 2015 v Bangladesh

Domestic team information
- Years: Team
- 2004/05–2010/11: Hyderabad
- 2011/12–2012/13: Sindh
- 2011/12–2012/13: Higher Education Commission
- 2014: Hyderabad
- 2014: Saif Sports Saga
- 2015–2015/16: Omar Associates
- 2016/17: State Bank of Pakistan

Career statistics
Competition	WODI	WT20I	WLA	WT20
Matches	19	15	66	48
Runs scored	49	16	39	184
Batting average	5.44	8.00	10.44	12.26
100s/50s	0/0	0/0	0/0	0/0
Top score	24*	9	38	31*
Balls bowled	770	270	2,934	902
Wickets	14	9	90	37
Bowling average	31.92	25.22	17.76	17.94
5 wickets in innings	0	0	4	0
10 wickets in match	0	0	0	0
Best bowling	2/14	2/9	7/21	3/5
Catches/stumpings	1/–	0/–	14/–	2/–
Medal record
Representing Pakistan
Women's Cricket
Asian Games
Gold medal – first place	2014 Incheon	Team
- Source: CricketArchive, 3 January 2022

Sumaiya Siddiqi (born 30 November 1988) is a Pakistani former cricketer who played as a right-arm medium bowler. She appeared in 19 One Day Internationals and 15 Twenty20 Internationals for Pakistan between 2007 and 2015. She played domestic cricket for Hyderabad, Sindh, Higher Education Commission, Saif Sports Saga, Omar Associates and State Bank of Pakistan.

== Career ==
=== One Day International ===
Sumaiya Siddiqi made her One Day International debut against South Africa on 26 January 2007.

=== T20I ===
Sumaiya Siddiqi made her Twenty20 International debut against England on 27 September 2012.

She was a member of the gold medal-winning Pakistan cricket team at the 2014 Asian Games.
