= Nahida Khan =

Pakistani cricketer

Personal information
- Full name: Nahida Bibi Khan
- Born: 3 November 1986 (age 40); Quetta, Pakistan
- Batting: Right-handed
- Bowling: Right-arm medium
- Role: Batter

International information
- National side: Pakistan (2009–2022)
- ODI debut (cap 51): 7 February 2009 v Sri Lanka
- Last ODI: 24 March 2022 v England
- T20I debut (cap 18): 14 October 2010 v Sri Lanka
- Last T20I: 29 January 2021 v South Africa

Domestic team information
- Years: Team
- 2004/05–2014: Quetta
- 2011/12–2012/13: Balochistan
- 2014: Saif Sports Saga
- 2015–2018/19: Zarai Taraqiati Bank Limited

Career statistics
Competition	WODI	WT20I	WLA	WT20
Matches	66	54	134	115
Runs scored	1,410	604	3,812	1,854
Batting average	23.50	13.13	33.43	22.57
100s/50s	0/8	0/0	3/26	0/8
Top score	79	43	155	79*
Balls bowled	36	6	1,269	186
Wickets	1	0	28	7
Bowling average	18.00	–	27.71	22.57
5 wickets in innings	0	0	1	0
10 wickets in match	0	0	0	0
Best bowling	1/6	–	5/15	2/6
Catches/stumpings	23/–	13/2	50/0	26/2
Medal record
Representing Pakistan
Women's Cricket
Asian Games
Gold medal – first place	2010 Guangzhou	Team
- Source: Cricinfo, 15 June 2023

Nahida Bibi Khan (born 3 November 1986) is a Pakistani former cricketer who played for Pakistan as a right-handed batter, and occasional right-arm medium-fast bowler and wicket-keeper. She has played domestic cricket for Quetta, Balochistan, Saif Sports Saga and Zarai Taraqiati Bank Limited. On 15 June 2023, she announced her retirement from international cricket.

== International career ==
Khan made her international one day debut on 7 February 2009 against Sri Lanka in Bogra, Bangladesh. She was part of the team at the Women's Cricket World Cup in Australia later that year. In 2010, Nahida was part of the Pakistan side that won the cricket gold at the 2010 Asian Games, in China.

In October 2018, she was named in Pakistan's squad for the 2018 ICC Women's World Twenty20 tournament in the West Indies. In February 2019, during the series against the West Indies Women, she became the fifth cricketer for Pakistan Women to score 1,000 runs in Women's One Day Internationals (WODIs).

In February 2020, she was added to Pakistan's squad for the 2020 ICC Women's T20 World Cup, replacing Bismah Maroof who was ruled out due to an injury. In January 2022, she was named in Pakistan's team for the 2022 Women's Cricket World Cup in New Zealand.
