= Kainat Imtiaz =

Pakistani cricketer

Personal information
- Full name: Kainat Imtiaz
- Born: 21 June 1992 (age 34); Karachi, Pakistan
- Batting: Right-handed
- Bowling: Right-arm medium-fast
- Role: All-rounder
- Relatives: Saleema Imtiaz (mother)

International information
- National side: Pakistan (2010–2023)
- ODI debut (cap 63): 15 November 2011 v Ireland
- Last ODI: 18 January 2023 v Australia
- T20I debut (cap 22): 16 October 2010 v Ireland
- Last T20I: 31 July 2022 v India

Domestic team information
- Years: Team
- 2007/08–2014: Karachi
- 2011/12–2012/13: Sindh
- 2014–2015/16: Omar Associates
- 2016: Saif Sports Saga
- 2016/17–2017: State Bank of Pakistan
- 2018/19: Zarai Taraqiati Bank Limited

Career statistics
Competition	WODI	WT20I	WLA	WT20
Matches	15	15	80	66
Runs scored	128	120	1,518	634
Batting average	12.80	15.00	27.60	18.11
100s/50s	0/0	0/0	2/8	0/1
Top score	24	29	122*	52*
Balls bowled	390	132	2,679	939
Wickets	9	6	67	34
Bowling average	44.44	20.33	28.97	30.08
5 wickets in innings	0	0	0	0
10 wickets in match	0	0	0	0
Best bowling	3/49	2/18	4/25	3/18
Catches/stumpings	3/–	2/–	29/–	26/–
Medal record
Representing Pakistan
Women's Cricket
Asian Games
Gold medal – first place	2010 Guangzhou	Team
Gold medal – first place	2014 Incheon	Team
- Source: CricketArchive, 18 January 2023

Kainat Imtiaz (اردو: کائنات امتیاز) (born 21 June 1992) is a Pakistani cricketer who plays for Pakistan as an all-rounder, batting right-handed and bowling right-arm medium-fast. She has also played domestic cricket for Karachi, Sindh, Omar Associates, Saif Sports Saga, State Bank of Pakistan and Zarai Taraqiati Bank Limited. International umpire Saleema Imtiaz is her mother.

== Early life and education ==
Kainat Imtiaz was born on 21 June 1992 in Karachi. Her early education started from Aga Khan School. She got admission in Hamdard Public School when she reached class III. She passed her intermediate from Aga Khan Higher Secondary School, Karachi (AKHSS) in 2010.

During the 2005 Women's Asia Cup in Pakistan, Kainat met Indian fast bowler Jhulan Goswami and decided to become a fast bowler. Kainat Imtiaz got married on 30 March 2022 to Mohammad Waqar Uddin.

== Career ==
In 2007, she represented her school as the captain and fast bowler in the U-17 Cricket tournament organized by Pakistan Cricket Board. She was declared Player of the Tournament; the prize was awarded by Dr. Muhammad Ali Shah. In the same year she took first position in myriad of Athletic activities like 200M, 400M, shot-put, and relay race. She traveled to Hyderabad to play the first ever U-17 Women Cricket Tournament as captain of the Karachi Team. She was later selected for the Pakistan Camp held in Karachi for the World Cup qualifying round. She was the youngest player among the 30 probables selected for the camp. In 2008, she played her second U-17 Women Cricket tournament held in Lahore as a captain. In the same year, she played Regional tournaments held in Hyderabad and Lahore organized by the Pakistan Cricket Board and her team won the tournament. She was selected for Pakistan Camp for the 2009 Women's Cricket World Cup which was held in Australia. She was the youngest player in the squad and after a camp of one month she was selected as a reserve player for the World Cup Team. During 2008, she represented Pakistan in the Super Sixes tournament in China. She played her first 20–20 Quadrangular Women Cricket tournament as a strike fast bowler of the south zone team. Kainat joined the PIA Cricket Academy sharpening her skills under the supervision of coaches including Azeem Hafeez, Zahid, Sajid and Sagheer Abbas (younger brother Zaheer Abbas). She was selected for the 2010 Asian Games held in Guangzhou, China, and was part of the Asian women's cricket gold -winning Pakistan team at the 2010 Games.

Kainat Imtiaz was recalled in the touring party of 17 for the three ODIs and T20Is each. A 17-player squad was announced for the three ODIs and as many T20Is, as Pakistan prepare for the Women's World Cup Qualifier in July 2021 for the main event in early 2022 in New Zealand. She was recalled after an impressive show in the domestic circuit. She averaged 111 from four games with a half-century and also picked up three wickets with her medium pace.

In October 2021, she was named in Pakistan's team for the 2021 Women's Cricket World Cup Qualifier tournament in Zimbabwe. In May 2022, she was named in Pakistan's team for the cricket tournament at the 2022 Commonwealth Games in Birmingham, England.
