= Iram Javed =

Pakistani cricketer (born 1991)

Personal information
- Full name: Iram Javed
- Born: 16 December 1991 (age 34); Lahore, Punjab, Pakistan
- Batting: Right-handed
- Bowling: Right-arm medium-fast
- Role: Batter

International information
- National side: Pakistan (2013–present)
- ODI debut (cap 65): 10 July 2013 v Ireland
- Last ODI: 27 November 2021 v Zimbabwe
- T20I debut (cap 28): 8 July 2013 v Ireland
- Last T20I: 3 August 2022 v Australia
- T20I shirt no.: 16

Domestic team information
- Years: Team
- 2010/11–2011/12: Lahore
- 2011/12–2012/13: Punjab
- 2012/13–2014: Higher Education Commission
- 2014: Lahore
- 2015: Omar Associates
- 2015/16–2018/19: State Bank of Pakistan

Career statistics
Competition	WODI	WT20I	WLA	WT20
Matches	21	42	84	91
Runs scored	222	318	1,789	1,147
Batting average	11.68	10.60	27.95	18.80
100s/50s	0/0	0/1	2/9	0/3
Top score	40	55	128	66*
Balls bowled	90	43	878	283
Wickets	3	1	22	9
Bowling average	26.66	55.00	25.81	29.88
5 wickets in innings	0	0	0	0
10 wickets in match	0	0	0	0
Best bowling	2/16	1/19	3/34	2/16
Catches/stumpings	1/–	11/–	32/–	22/–
- Source: CricketArchive, 31 July 2022

Iram Javed (born 16 December 1991) is a Pakistani cricketer who currently plays for Pakistan as a right-handed batter and occasional right-arm medium-fast bowler. She has also played domestic cricket for Lahore, Punjab, Higher Education Commission, Omar Associates and State Bank of Pakistan.

In January 2020, she was named in Pakistan's squad for the 2020 ICC Women's T20 World Cup in Australia. In October 2021, she was named in Pakistan's team for the 2021 Women's Cricket World Cup Qualifier tournament in Zimbabwe. In January 2022, she was named as a reserve in Pakistan's team for the 2022 Women's Cricket World Cup in New Zealand. In May 2022, she was named in Pakistan's team for the cricket tournament at the 2022 Commonwealth Games in Birmingham, England.

She was named in the Pakistan squad for the 2024 ICC Women's T20 World Cup.
