= 2009 Women's World Twenty20 squads =

This is a list of squads picked for the 2009 ICC Women's World Twenty20 tournament, held in England in June 2009. Age given is at the start of the tournament.

== Australia ==
Player	Birth date	Batting style	Bowling style	Domestic team
Karen Rolton (c)	21 November 1974 (aged 34)	Left	Left-arm medium	South Australia
Sarah Andrews	26 December 1981 (aged 27)	Right	Right-arm medium	New South Wales
Alex Blackwell	31 August 1983 (aged 25)	Right	Right-arm medium	New South Wales
Jess Cameron	27 June 1989 (aged 19)	Right	Right-arm leg break	Victoria
Lauren Ebsary	15 March 1983 (aged 26)	Right	Right-arm medium	Western Australia
Rene Farrell	13 January 1987 (aged 22)	Right	Right-arm medium	Western Australia
Jodie Fields (wk)	19 June 1984 (aged 24)	Right	–	Queensland
Shelley Nitschke	3 December 1976 (aged 32)	Left	Slow left-arm orthodox	South Australia
Erin Osborne	27 June 1989 (aged 19)	Right	Right-arm off break	New South Wales
Ellyse Perry	3 November 1990 (aged 18)	Right	Right-arm medium	New South Wales
Kirsten Pike	12 November 1984 (aged 24)	Right	Right-arm medium	Queensland
Leah Poulton	27 February 1984 (aged 25)	Right	Right-arm leg break	New South Wales
Lisa Sthalekar	13 August 1979 (aged 29)	Right	Right-arm off break	New South Wales
Elyse Villani	6 October 1989 (aged 19)	Right	Right-arm medium	Victoria

== England ==
Player	Birth date	Batting style	Bowling style	Domestic team
Charlotte Edwards (c)	17 December 1979 (aged 29)	Right	Right-arm leg break	Kent
Caroline Atkins	13 January 1981 (aged 28)	Right	–	Sussex
Katherine Brunt	2 July 1985 (aged 23)	Right	Right-arm medium-fast	Yorkshire
Holly Colvin	7 September 1989 (aged 19)	Right	Slow left-arm orthodox	Sussex
Lydia Greenway	6 August 1985 (aged 23)	Left	Right-arm off break	Kent
Isa Guha	21 May 1985 (aged 24)	Right	Right-arm medium	Berkshire
Jenny Gunn	9 May 1986 (aged 23)	Right	Right-arm medium	Nottinghamshire
Danielle Hazell	13 May 1988 (aged 21)	Right	Right-arm off break	Yorkshire
Laura Marsh	5 December 1986 (aged 22)	Right	Right-arm off break	Sussex
Beth Morgan	27 September 1981 (aged 27)	Right	Right-arm medium	Middlesex
Ebony Rainford-Brent	31 December 1983 (aged 25)	Right	Right-arm medium	Surrey
Nicky Shaw	30 December 1981 (aged 27)	Right	Right-arm medium	Surrey
Claire Taylor	25 September 1975 (aged 33)	Right	–	Berkshire
Sarah Taylor (wk)	20 May 1989 (aged 20)	Right	–	Sussex
Withdrawn players
Anya Shrubsole	7 December 1991 (aged 17)	Right	Right-arm medium	Somerset

== India ==
Player	Birth date	Batting style	Bowling style	Domestic team
Jhulan Goswami (c)	25 November 1982 (aged 26)	Right	Right-arm medium	Bengal
Anjum Chopra	20 May 1977 (aged 32)	Left	Right-arm medium	Delhi
Anagha Deshpande (wk)	19 November 1985 (aged 23)	Right	–	Maharashtra
Rumeli Dhar	9 December 1983 (aged 25)	Right	Right-arm medium	Railways
Harmanpreet Kaur	8 March 1989 (aged 20)	Right	Right-arm off break	Punjab
Latika Kumari	5 January 1982 (aged 27)	Right	Right-arm medium	Delhi
Reema Malhotra	17 October 1980 (aged 28)	Right	Right-arm leg break	Delhi
Babita Mandlik	16 July 1981 (aged 27)	Right	Right-arm medium	Railways
Sulakshana Naik (wk)	10 November 1978 (aged 30)	Right	–	Railways
Mithali Raj	3 December 1982 (aged 26)	Right	Right-arm leg break	Railways
Punam Raut	14 October 1989 (aged 19)	Right	Right-arm off break	Mumbai
Priyanka Roy	2 March 1988 (aged 21)	Right	Right-arm leg break	Railways
Amita Sharma	12 September 1982 (aged 26)	Right	Right-arm medium	Railways
Gouher Sultana	31 March 1988 (aged 21)	Right	Slow left-arm orthodox	Hyderabad

== New Zealand ==
Player	Birth date	Batting style	Bowling style	Domestic team
Aimee Watkins (c)	11 October 1982 (aged 26)	Left	Right-arm off break	Central Districts
Suzie Bates	16 September 1987 (aged 21)	Right	Right-arm medium	Otago
Nicola Browne	14 September 1983 (aged 25)	Right	Right-arm medium	Northern Districts
Saskia Bullen	20 July 1983 (aged 25)	Right	Slow left-arm orthodox	Auckland
Sophie Devine	1 September 1989 (aged 19)	Right	Right-arm medium	Wellington
Lucy Doolan	11 December 1987 (aged 21)	Right	Right-arm off break	Wellington
Victoria Lind	15 May 1985 (aged 24)	Right	–	Auckland
Katey Martin (wk)	7 February 1985 (aged 24)	Right	–	Otago
Sara McGlashan	28 March 1982 (aged 27)	Right	–	Central Districts
Rachel Priest (wk)	13 June 1985 (aged 23)	Right	–	Central Districts
Kate Pulford	27 August 1980 (aged 28)	Right	Right-arm medium	Northern Districts
Sian Ruck	8 December 1983 (aged 25)	Right	Left-arm medium	Wellington
Amy Satterthwaite	7 October 1986 (aged 22)	Left	Right-arm off break	Canterbury
Sarah Tsukigawa	16 January 1982 (aged 27)	Right	Right-arm medium	Otago

== Pakistan ==
Player	Birth date	Batting style	Bowling style	Domestic team
Sana Mir (c)	5 January 1986 (aged 23)	Right	Right-arm off break	Karachi
Almas Akram	15 April 1988 (aged 21)	Right	Left-arm medium	Sialkot
Armaan Khan	4 April 1980 (aged 29)	Right	–	Karachi
Asmavia Iqbal	1 January 1988 (aged 21)	Right	Right-arm medium	Multan
Batool Fatima (wk)	14 August 1982 (aged 26)	Right	Right-arm medium	Karachi
Bismah Maroof	18 July 1991 (aged 17)	Left	Right-arm leg break	Lahore
Javeria Khan	14 May 1988 (aged 21)	Right	Right-arm off break	Karachi
Marina Iqbal	7 March 1987 (aged 22)	Right	Right-arm medium	Lahore
Naila Nazir	30 March 1989 (aged 20)	Right	Right-arm leg break	Islamabad
Nain Abidi	23 May 1985 (aged 24)	Right	–	Karachi
Nazia Sadiq	7 August 1976 (aged 32)	Right	–	Lahore
Qanita Jalil	21 March 1978 (aged 31)	Right	Right-arm medium	Abbottabad
Sajjida Shah	3 February 1988 (aged 21)	Right	Right-arm off break	Hyderabad
Urooj Mumtaz	1 October 1985 (aged 23)	Right	Right-arm leg break	Karachi

== South Africa ==
Player	Birth date	Batting style	Bowling style	Domestic team
Sunette Loubser (c)	26 September 1982 (aged 26)	Right	Right-arm off break	Boland
Susan Benade	16 February 1982 (aged 27)	Right	Right-arm medium	Free State
Cri-Zelda Brits	20 November 1983 (aged 25)	Right	Right-arm medium	Gauteng
Trisha Chetty (wk)	26 June 1988 (aged 20)	Right	–	KwaZulu-Natal
Dinesha Devnarain	12 November 1988 (aged 20)	Right	Right-arm medium	KwaZulu-Natal
Mignon du Preez	13 June 1989 (aged 19)	Right	Right-arm off break	Northerns
Shandre Fritz	21 July 1985 (aged 23)	Right	Right-arm medium	Western Province
Shabnim Ismail	5 October 1988 (aged 20)	Left	Right-arm fast-medium	Western Province
Marizanne Kapp	4 January 1990 (aged 19)	Right	Right-arm medium	Eastern Province
Ashlyn Kilowan	19 December 1982 (aged 26)	Left	Left-arm medium	Western Province
Marcia Letsoalo	11 April 1984 (aged 25)	Right	Right-arm medium	Northerns
Alicia Smith	13 March 1984 (aged 25)	Right	Right-arm medium	Boland
Charlize van der Westhuizen	17 February 1984 (aged 25)	Right	Slow left-arm orthodox	Northerns
Dane van Niekerk	14 May 1993 (aged 16)	Right	Right-arm leg break	Northerns

== Sri Lanka ==
Player	Birth date	Batting style	Bowling style	Domestic team
Chamari Polgampola (c)	20 March 1981 (aged 28)	Left	Right-arm medium	Slimline Sports Club
Sanduni Abeywickrama	12 December 1982 (aged 26)	Right	Right-arm off break	Colombo Cricket Club
Chamari Atapattu	9 February 1990 (aged 19)	Left	Right-arm medium	Colts Cricket Club
Chamika Bandara	13 November 1980 (aged 28)	Right	Right-arm medium	Slimline Sports Club
Sandamali Dolawatte	10 February 1983 (aged 26)	Right	Right-arm leg break	Colts Cricket Club
Hiruka Fernando	11 September 1976 (aged 32)	Left	Slow left-arm orthodox	Slimline Sports Club
Rose Fernando	28 July 1979 (aged 29)	Right	Right-arm off break	Slimline Sports Club
Sumudu Fernando	8 February 1982 (aged 27)	Right	Right-arm medium	Palink Sports Club
Inoka Galagedara	17 July 1977 (aged 31)	Right	Right-arm medium	Marians
Eshani Kaushalya	1 June 1984 (aged 25)	Right	Right-arm medium	Colts Cricket Club
Dilani Manodara (wk)	8 December 1982 (aged 26)	Right	–	Slimline Sports Club
Udeshika Prabodhani	20 September 1985 (aged 23)	Right	Left-arm medium	Colombo Cricket Club
Deepika Rasangika	13 December 1983 (aged 25)	Left	Left-arm medium	Colts Cricket Club
Sripali Weerakkody	7 January 1986 (aged 23)	Left	Right-arm medium	Slimline Sports Club

== West Indies ==
Player	Birth date	Batting style	Bowling style	Domestic team
Merissa Aguilleira (c) (wk)	14 December 1985 (aged 23)	Right	–	Trinidad and Tobago
Kirbyina Alexander	6 July 1987 (aged 21)	Right	Right-arm medium	Trinidad and Tobago
Shanel Daley	25 December 1988 (aged 20)	Left	Left-arm medium	Jamaica
Deandra Dottin	21 June 1991 (aged 17)	Right	Right-arm medium	Barbados
Cordel Jack	22 February 1982 (aged 27)	Right	Right-arm off break	Saint Vincent and the Grenadines
Stacy-Ann King	13 July 1983 (aged 25)	Left	Left-arm medium	Trinidad and Tobago
Pamela Lavine	12 March 1969 (aged 40)	Right	Right-arm medium	Barbados
Debbie-Ann Lewis	7 August 1969 (aged 39)	Right	Right-arm medium	Grenada
Anisa Mohammed	7 August 1988 (aged 20)	Right	Right-arm off break	Trinidad and Tobago
Juliana Nero	14 July 1979 (aged 29)	Right	Right-arm medium	Saint Vincent and the Grenadines
Shakera Selman	1 September 1989 (aged 19)	Right	Right-arm medium	Barbados
Danielle Small	16 March 1989 (aged 20)	Right	Right-arm off break	Barbados
Charlene Taitt	2 September 1984 (aged 24)	Right	Right-arm off break	Barbados
Stafanie Taylor	11 June 1991 (aged 18)	Right	Right-arm off break	Jamaica
