= International cricket in 2022 =

International cricket season

The 2022 international cricket season was from May 2022 to September 2022. 15 Tests, 71 One Day Internationals (ODIs), and 63 Twenty20 Internationals (T20Is) matches, including the 2022 Asia Cup, were played in this season. In women's international cricket, one women's Test match, 18 Women's One Day Internationals (WODIs) and 144 Women's Twenty20 Internationals (WT20Is) were played in this season. Included among the T20I/WT20I matches were a number of series involving associate nations.

In May 2022, the International Cricket Council (ICC) confirmed that the third cycle of the ICC Women's Championship would start during this season, with the Pakistan women's team hosting Sri Lanka in June 2022. At the same time, the ICC also awarded WODI status to the Netherlands, Papua New Guinea, Scotland, Thailand and the United States. Also in women's international cricket, a tournament was held as part of the 2022 Commonwealth Games, in Birmingham, England, in July and August 2022.

In September 2021, the fifth Test match between England and India was cancelled a few hours before the scheduled start, due to COVID-19 cases in the Indian camp. The match was rescheduled, and took place in July 2022, ahead of India's white-ball tour of England. In July 2022, Cambodia, the Ivory Coast and Uzbekistan were all awarded Associate Membership of the ICC.

== Season overview ==
Men's international tours
Start date	Home team	Away team	Results [Matches]		
Start date	Home team	Away team	Test	ODI	T20I
15 May 2022	Bangladesh	Sri Lanka	0–1 [2]	—	—
17 May 2022	Zimbabwe	Namibia	—	—	2–3 [5]
31 May 2022	Netherlands	West Indies	—	0–3 [3]	—
2 June 2022	England	New Zealand	3–0 [3]	—	—
4 June 2022	Zimbabwe	Afghanistan	—	0–3 [3]	0–3 [3]
7 June 2022	Sri Lanka	Australia	1–1 [2]	3–2 [5]	1–2 [3]
8 June 2022	Pakistan	West Indies	—	3–0 [3]	—
9 June 2022	India	South Africa	—	—	2–2 [5]
16 June 2022	West Indies	Bangladesh	2–0 [2]	0–3 [3]	2–0 [3]
17 June 2022	Netherlands	England	—	0–3 [3]	—
26 June 2022	Ireland	India	—	—	0–2 [2]
7 July 2022	England	India	1–0 [1] (Note: The Test match was a continuation of last summer's Test series.)	1–2 [3]	1–2 [3]
10 July 2022	Ireland	New Zealand	—	0–3 [3]	0–3 [3]
16 July 2022	Sri Lanka	Pakistan	1–1 [2]	—	—
19 July 2022	England	South Africa	2–1 [3]	1–1 [3]	1–2 [3]
22 July 2022	(United States) West Indies	India	—	0–3 [3]	1–4 [5]
27 July 2022	Scotland	New Zealand	—	0–1 [1]	0–2 [2]
30 July 2022	Zimbabwe	Bangladesh	—	2–1 [3]	2–1 [3]
3 August 2022	(England) Ireland	South Africa	—	—	0–2 [2]
4 August 2022	Netherlands	New Zealand	—	—	0–2 [2]
9 August 2022	Ireland	Afghanistan	—	—	3–2 [5]
10 August 2022	West Indies	New Zealand	—	1–2 [3]	1–2 [3]
16 August 2022	Netherlands	Pakistan	—	0–3 [3]	—
18 August 2022	Zimbabwe	India	—	0–3 [3]	—
28 August 2022	Australia	Zimbabwe	—	2–1 [3]	—
Men's international tournaments
Start date	Tournament				Winners
28 May 2022	2022 United States Tri-Nation Series (round 12)				—N/a
8 June 2022	2022 United States Tri-Nation Series (round 13)				—N/a
17 June 2022	2022 Uganda Cricket World Cup Challenge League B				—N/a
10 July 2022	2022 Scotland Tri-Nation Series (round 14)				—N/a
27 July 2022	2022 Canada Cricket World Cup Challenge League A				—N/a
4 August 2022	2022 Jersey Cricket World Cup Challenge League B				—N/a
10 August 2022	2022 Scotland Tri-Nation Series (round 15)				—N/a
27 August 2022	(United Arab Emirates) 2022 Asia Cup				Sri Lanka

Women's international tours
Start date	Home team	Away team	Results [Matches]		
Start date	Home team	Away team	WTest	WODI	WT20I
24 May 2022	Pakistan	Sri Lanka	—	2–1 [3]	3–0 [3]
3 June 2022	Ireland	South Africa	—	0–3 [3]	1–2 [3]
23 June 2022	Sri Lanka	India	—	0–3 [3]	1–2 [3]
27 June 2022	England	South Africa	0–0 [1]	3–0 [3]	3–0 [3]
22 August 2022	Netherlands	Ireland	—	0–3 [3]	—
5 September 2022	Scotland	Ireland	—	—	0–2 [3]
10 September 2022	England	India	—	0–3 [3]	2–1 [3]
Women's international tournaments
Start date	Tournament			Winners	
16 July 2022	2022 Ireland Women's Tri-Nation Series			Australia	
29 July 2022	(England) 2022 Commonwealth Games – Women's Tournament			Australia	

== Rankings ==
The following were the rankings at the beginning of the season.

ICC Men's Test Team Rankings 4 May 2022
Rank	Team	Matches	Points	Rating
1	Australia	19	2,439	128
2	India	23	2,736	119
3	New Zealand	23	2,552	111
4	South Africa	21	2,306	110
5	Pakistan	10	1,865	93
6	England	29	2,551	88
7	Sri Lanka	17	1,384	81
8	West Indies	22	1,685	77
9	Bangladesh	16	823	51
10	Zimbabwe	6	148	25

ICC Men's ODI Team Rankings 4 May 2022
Rank	Team	Matches	Points	Rating
1	New Zealand	16	2,051	128
2	England	27	3,226	119
3	India	28	3,085	110
4	Pakistan	19	2,005	106
5	Australia	23	2,325	101
6	South Africa	21	2,111	101
7	Bangladesh	30	2,753	92
8	Sri Lanka	29	2,658	92
9	West Indies	38	2,621	69
10	Afghanistan	18	1,238	69
11	Ireland	23	1,214	53
12	Scotland	24	1,113	46
13	Zimbabwe	20	819	41
14	United Arab Emirates	20	725	36
15	Netherlands	18	603	34
16	Oman	30	919	31
Only the top 16 teams are shown

ICC Men's T20I Team Rankings 4 May 2022
Rank	Team	Matches	Points	Rating
1	India	30	8,093	270
2	England	28	7,432	265
3	Pakistan	30	7,826	261
4	South Africa	25	6,336	253
5	Australia	33	8,270	251
6	New Zealand	28	6,996	250
7	West Indies	36	8,622	240
8	Bangladesh	33	7,680	233
9	Sri Lanka	33	7,606	230
10	Afghanistan	14	3,167	226
11	Zimbabwe	23	4,429	193
12	United Arab Emirates	21	4,030	192
13	Nepal	25	4,624	185
14	Ireland	35	6,439	184
15	Scotland	19	3,475	183
16	Namibia	24	4,309	180
Only the top 16 teams are shown

ICC Women's ODI Rankings 3 April 2022
Rank	Team	Matches	Points	Rating
1	Australia	29	4,840	167
2	South Africa	28	3,504	125
3	England	30	3,533	118
4	India	29	2,890	100
5	New Zealand	31	3,018	97
6	West Indies	28	2,478	89
7	Bangladesh	12	935	78
8	Pakistan	26	1,753	67
9	Ireland	5	240	48
10	Sri Lanka	5	233	47

ICC Women's T20I Rankings 14 February 2022
Rank	Team	Matches	Points	Rating
1	Australia	21	6,160	293
2	England	26	7,398	285
3	New Zealand	18	4,801	267
4	India	24	6,295	262
5	South Africa	20	5,030	252
6	West Indies	19	4,691	247
7	Pakistan	18	4,027	224
8	Sri Lanka	12	2,476	206
9	Bangladesh	15	2,850	190
10	Thailand	17	2,851	168
11	Zimbabwe	17	2,730	161
12	Ireland	20	3,209	160
13	Scotland	20	3,036	152
14	Papua New Guinea	9	1,174	130
15	United Arab Emirates	11	1,406	128
16	Samoa	6	749	125
Only the top 16 teams are shown

=== On-going tournaments ===
The following were the rankings at the beginning of the season.

2021–2023 ICC World Test Championship
Rank	Team	Series	PCT
1	Australia	2	75.00%
2	South Africa	3	71.42%
3	India	4*	58.33%
4	Pakistan	3	52.38%
5	Sri Lanka	2	50.00%
6	New Zealand	3	38.88%
7	West Indies	3	35.71%
8	Bangladesh	3	16.66%
9	England	3*	12.50%
Full Table

2020–2023 ICC Cricket World Cup Super League
Rank	Team	Matches	Points
1	Bangladesh	18	120
2	England	15	95
3	India	12	79
4	Australia	12	70
5	Afghanistan	9	70
6	Ireland	18	68
7	Sri Lanka	18	62
8	New Zealand	6	60
9	Pakistan	12	60
10	West Indies	15	50
11	South Africa	13	49
12	Zimbabwe	12	35
13	Netherlands	10	25
Full Table

2019–2023 ICC Cricket World Cup League 2
Rank	Team	Matches	Points
1	Oman	32	40
2	Scotland	16	24
3	United Arab Emirates	18	22
4	Namibia	14	14
5	United States	16	14
6	Nepal	12	12
7	Papua New Guinea	20	2
Full Table

2019–22 ICC Cricket World Cup Challenge League
League A
Rank	Team	Matches	Points
1	Canada	5	8
2	Singapore	5	8
3	Qatar	5	6
4	Denmark	5	4
5	Malaysia	5	2
6	Vanuatu	5	2
Full Table

2019–22 ICC Cricket World Cup Challenge League
League B
Rank	Team	Matches	Points
1	Uganda	5	10
2	Hong Kong	5	7
3	Italy	5	5
4	Jersey	5	4
5	Kenya	5	3
6	Bermuda	5	1
Full Table

== May ==
=== Sri Lanka in Bangladesh ===
2021–2023 ICC World Test Championship – Test series
No.	Date	Home captain	Away captain	Venue	Result
Test 2462	15–19 May	Mominul Haque	Dimuth Karunaratne	Zohur Ahmed Chowdhury Stadium, Chittagong	Match drawn
Test 2463	23–27 May	Mominul Haque	Dimuth Karunaratne	Sher-e-Bangla National Cricket Stadium, Dhaka	Sri Lanka by 10 wickets

=== Namibia in Zimbabwe ===
T20I series
No.	Date	Home captain	Away captain	Venue	Result
T20I 1540	17 May	Craig Ervine	Gerhard Erasmus	Queens Sports Club, Bulawayo	Zimbabwe by 7 runs
T20I 1541	19 May	Craig Ervine	Gerhard Erasmus	Queens Sports Club, Bulawayo	Namibia by 8 wickets
T20I 1544	21 May	Craig Ervine	Gerhard Erasmus	Queens Sports Club, Bulawayo	Zimbabwe by 8 wickets
T20I 1546	22 May	Craig Ervine	Gerhard Erasmus	Queens Sports Club, Bulawayo	Namibia by 6 wickets
T20I 1547	24 May	Regis Chakabva	Gerhard Erasmus	Queens Sports Club, Bulawayo	Namibia by 32 runs

=== Sri Lanka women in Pakistan ===
WT20I series
No.	Date	Home captain	Away captain	Venue	Result
WT20I 1081	24 May	Bismah Maroof	Chamari Athapaththu	Southend Club Cricket Stadium, Karachi	Pakistan by 6 wickets
WT20I 1082	26 May	Bismah Maroof	Chamari Athapaththu	Southend Club Cricket Stadium, Karachi	Pakistan by 7 wickets
WT20I 1086	28 May	Bismah Maroof	Chamari Athapaththu	Southend Club Cricket Stadium, Karachi	Pakistan by 4 wickets
2022–2025 ICC Women's Championship – WODI series
No.	Date	Home captain	Away captain	Venue	Result
WODI 1275	1 June	Bismah Maroof	Chamari Athapaththu	Southend Club Cricket Stadium, Karachi	Pakistan by 8 wickets
WODI 1276	3 June	Bismah Maroof	Chamari Athapaththu	Southend Club Cricket Stadium, Karachi	Pakistan by 73 runs
WODI 1277	5 June	Bismah Maroof	Chamari Athapaththu	Southend Club Cricket Stadium, Karachi	Sri Lanka by 93 runs

=== 2022 United States Tri-Nation Series (round 12) ===
2019–2023 ICC Cricket World Cup League 2 – Tri-series
No.	Date	Team 1	Captain 1	Team 2	Captain 2	Venue	Result
ODI 4390	28 May	United States	Monank Patel	Scotland	Kyle Coetzer	Moosa Stadium, Pearland	United States by 104 runs
ODI 4391	29 May	United States	Monank Patel	Scotland	Kyle Coetzer	Moosa Stadium, Pearland	Scotland by 111 runs
ODI 4393	31 May	Scotland	Kyle Coetzer	United Arab Emirates	Ahmed Raza	Moosa Stadium, Pearland	Scotland by 4 wickets
ODI 4394	1 June	United States	Monank Patel	United Arab Emirates	Ahmed Raza	Moosa Stadium, Pearland	United States by 4 wickets
ODI 4396	3 June	Scotland	Kyle Coetzer	United Arab Emirates	Ahmed Raza	Moosa Stadium, Pearland	United Arab Emirates by 5 wickets
ODI 4399	4 June	United States	Monank Patel	United Arab Emirates	Ahmed Raza	Moosa Stadium, Pearland	United Arab Emirates by 8 wickets

=== West Indies in Netherlands ===
2020–2023 ICC Cricket World Cup Super League – ODI series
No.	Date	Home captain	Away captain	Venue	Result
ODI 4392	31 May	Pieter Seelaar	Nicholas Pooran	VRA Cricket Ground, Amstelveen	West Indies by 7 wickets (DLS)
ODI 4395	2 June	Pieter Seelaar	Nicholas Pooran	VRA Cricket Ground, Amstelveen	West Indies by 5 wickets
ODI 4398	4 June	Pieter Seelaar	Nicholas Pooran	VRA Cricket Ground, Amstelveen	West Indies by 20 runs

== June ==
=== New Zealand in England ===
2021–2023 ICC World Test Championship – Test series
No.	Date	Home captain	Away captain	Venue	Result
Test 2464	2–6 June	Ben Stokes	Kane Williamson	Lord's, London	England by 5 wickets
Test 2465	10–14 June	Ben Stokes	Tom Latham	Trent Bridge, Nottingham	England by 5 wickets
Test 2467	23–27 June	Ben Stokes	Kane Williamson	Headingley, Leeds	England by 7 wickets

=== South Africa women in Ireland ===
WT20I series
No.	Date	Home captain	Away captain	Venue	Result
WT20I 1090	3 June	Gaby Lewis	Suné Luus	Sydney Parade, Dublin	Ireland won by 10 runs
WT20I 1091	6 June	Gaby Lewis	Suné Luus	Sydney Parade, Dublin	South Africa by 8 wickets
WT20I 1092	8 June	Gaby Lewis	Suné Luus	Sydney Parade, Dublin	South Africa by 8 wickets
2022–2025 ICC Women's Championship – WODI series
No.	Date	Home captain	Away captain	Venue	Result
WODI 1278	11 June	Gaby Lewis	Suné Luus	Clontarf Cricket Club Ground, Dublin	South Africa by 9 wickets
WODI 1279	14 June	Gaby Lewis	Suné Luus	Clontarf Cricket Club Ground, Dublin	South Africa by 9 wickets
WODI 1280	17 June	Gaby Lewis	Suné Luus	Clontarf Cricket Club Ground, Dublin	South Africa by 189 runs

=== Afghanistan in Zimbabwe ===
2020–2023 ICC Cricket World Cup Super League – ODI series
No.	Date	Home captain	Away captain	Venue	Result
ODI 4397	4 June	Craig Ervine	Hashmatullah Shahidi	Harare Sports Club, Harare	Afghanistan by 60 runs
ODI 4400	6 June	Craig Ervine	Hashmatullah Shahidi	Harare Sports Club, Harare	Afghanistan by 8 wickets
ODI 4403	9 June	Craig Ervine	Hashmatullah Shahidi	Harare Sports Club, Harare	Afghanistan by 4 wickets
T20I series
No.	Date	Home captain	Away captain	Venue	Result
T20I 1561	11 June	Craig Ervine	Mohammad Nabi	Harare Sports Club, Harare	Afghanistan by 6 wickets
T20I 1568	12 June	Craig Ervine	Mohammad Nabi	Harare Sports Club, Harare	Afghanistan by 21 runs
T20I 1570	14 June	Craig Ervine	Mohammad Nabi	Harare Sports Club, Harare	Afghanistan by 35 runs

=== Australia in Sri Lanka ===
T20I series
No.	Date	Home captain	Away captain	Venue	Result
T20I 1551	7 June	Dasun Shanaka	Aaron Finch	R. Premadasa Stadium, Colombo	Australia by 10 wickets
T20I 1552	8 June	Dasun Shanaka	Aaron Finch	R. Premadasa Stadium, Colombo	Australia by 3 wickets
T20I 1564	11 June	Dasun Shanaka	Aaron Finch	Pallekele International Cricket Stadium, Kandy	Sri Lanka by 4 wickets
ODI series
No.	Date	Home captain	Away captain	Venue	Result
ODI 4409	14 June	Dasun Shanaka	Aaron Finch	Pallekele International Cricket Stadium, Kandy	Australia by 2 wickets (DLS)
ODI 4412	16 June	Dasun Shanaka	Aaron Finch	Pallekele International Cricket Stadium, Kandy	Sri Lanka by 26 runs (DLS)
ODI 4415	19 June	Dasun Shanaka	Aaron Finch	R. Premadasa Stadium, Colombo	Sri Lanka by 6 wickets
ODI 4416	21 June	Dasun Shanaka	Aaron Finch	R. Premadasa Stadium, Colombo	Sri Lanka by 4 runs
ODI 4418	24 June	Dasun Shanaka	Aaron Finch	R. Premadasa Stadium, Colombo	Australia by 4 wickets
2021–2023 ICC World Test Championship – Test series
No.	Date	Home captain	Away captain	Venue	Result
Test 2469	29 June – 3 July	Dimuth Karunaratne	Pat Cummins	Galle International Stadium, Galle	Australia by 10 wickets
Test 2471	8–12 July	Dimuth Karunaratne	Pat Cummins	Galle International Stadium, Galle	Sri Lanka by an innings and 39 runs

=== West Indies in Pakistan ===
2020–2023 ICC Cricket World Cup Super League – ODI series
No.	Date	Home captain	Away captain	Venue	Result
ODI 4401	8 June	Babar Azam	Nicholas Pooran	Multan Cricket Stadium, Multan	Pakistan by 5 wickets
ODI 4405	10 June	Babar Azam	Nicholas Pooran	Multan Cricket Stadium, Multan	Pakistan by 120 runs
ODI 4407	12 June	Babar Azam	Nicholas Pooran	Multan Cricket Stadium, Multan	Pakistan by 53 runs (DLS)

=== 2022 United States Tri-Nation Series (round 13) ===
2019–2023 ICC Cricket World Cup League 2 – Tri-series
No.	Date	Team 1	Captain 1	Team 2	Captain 2	Venue	Result
ODI 4402	8 June	United States	Monank Patel	Oman	Zeeshan Maqsood	Moosa Stadium, Pearland	United States by 114 runs
ODI 4404	9 June	Nepal	Sandeep Lamichhane	Oman	Zeeshan Maqsood	Moosa Stadium, Pearland	Oman by 13 runs
ODI 4406	11 June	United States	Monank Patel	Nepal	Sandeep Lamichhane	Moosa Stadium, Pearland	Match tied
ODI 4408	12 June	United States	Monank Patel	Oman	Zeeshan Maqsood	Moosa Stadium, Pearland	Oman by 13 runs
ODI 4410	14 June	Nepal	Sandeep Lamichhane	Oman	Zeeshan Maqsood	Moosa Stadium, Pearland	Nepal by 7 wickets
ODI 4411	15 June	United States	Monank Patel	Nepal	Sandeep Lamichhane	Moosa Stadium, Pearland	United States by 39 runs

=== South Africa in India ===
T20I series
No.	Date	Home captain	Away captain	Venue	Result
T20I 1554	9 June	Rishabh Pant	Temba Bavuma	Arun Jaitley Cricket Stadium, Delhi	South Africa by 7 wickets
T20I 1569	12 June	Rishabh Pant	Temba Bavuma	Barabati Stadium, Cuttack	South Africa by 4 wickets
T20I 1571	14 June	Rishabh Pant	Temba Bavuma	ACA–VDCA Cricket Stadium, Visakhapatnam	India by 48 runs
T20I 1572	17 June	Rishabh Pant	Temba Bavuma	Saurashtra Cricket Association Stadium, Rajkot	India by 82 runs
T20I 1575	19 June	Rishabh Pant	Keshav Maharaj	M. Chinnaswamy Stadium, Bengaluru	No result

=== Bangladesh in West Indies ===
2021–2023 ICC World Test Championship – Test series
No.	Date	Home captain	Away captain	Venue	Result
Test 2466	16–20 June	Kraigg Brathwaite	Shakib Al Hasan	Sir Vivian Richards Stadium, North Sound	West Indies by 7 wickets
Test 2468	24–28 June	Kraigg Brathwaite	Shakib Al Hasan	Daren Sammy Cricket Ground, Gros Islet	West Indies by 10 wickets
T20I series
No.	Date	Home captain	Away captain	Venue	Result
T20I 1601	2 July	Nicholas Pooran	Mahmudullah	Windsor Park, Dominica	No result
T20I 1607	3 July	Nicholas Pooran	Mahmudullah	Windsor Park, Dominica	West Indies by 35 runs
T20I 1617	7 July	Nicholas Pooran	Mahmudullah	Providence Stadium, Guyana	West Indies by 5 wickets
ODI series
No.	Date	Home captain	Away captain	Venue	Result
ODI 4421	10 July	Nicholas Pooran	Tamim Iqbal	Providence Stadium, Guyana	Bangladesh by 6 wickets
ODI 4426	13 July	Nicholas Pooran	Tamim Iqbal	Providence Stadium, Guyana	Bangladesh by 9 wickets
ODI 4431	16 July	Nicholas Pooran	Tamim Iqbal	Providence Stadium, Guyana	Bangladesh by 4 wickets

=== 2022 Uganda Cricket World Cup Challenge League B ===
2019–2022 ICC Cricket World Cup Challenge League – List A series
No.	Date	Team 1	Captain 1	Team 2	Captain 2	Venue	Result
1st List A	17 June	Uganda	Brian Masaba	Jersey	Charles Perchard	Lugogo Stadium, Kampala	Jersey by 62 runs
2nd List A	18 June	Hong Kong	Nizakat Khan	Italy	Gareth Berg	Lugogo Stadium, Kampala	Hong Kong by 58 runs
3rd List A	18 June	Bermuda	Kamau Leverock	Kenya	Shem Ngoche	Kyambogo Cricket Oval, Kampala	Kenya by 6 wickets
4th List A	20 June	Jersey	Charles Perchard	Kenya	Shem Ngoche	Lugogo Stadium, Kampala	Jersey by 96 runs
5th List A	20 June	Uganda	Brian Masaba	Hong Kong	Nizakat Khan	Kyambogo Cricket Oval, Kampala	Hong Kong by 6 wickets
6th List A	21 June	Uganda	Brian Masaba	Bermuda	Kamau Leverock	Lugogo Stadium, Kampala	Uganda by 8 wickets
7th List A	21 June	Italy	Gareth Berg	Jersey	Charles Perchard	Kyambogo Cricket Oval, Kampala	Jersey by 88 runs
8th List A	23 June	Italy	Gareth Berg	Kenya	Rakep Patel	Lugogo Stadium, Kampala	Kenya by 134 runs
9th List A	23 June	Bermuda	Kamau Leverock	Hong Kong	Nizakat Khan	Kyambogo Cricket Oval, Kampala	Hong Kong by 194 runs
10th List A	24 June	Hong Kong	Nizakat Khan	Jersey	Charles Perchard	Lugogo Stadium, Kampala	Jersey by 55 runs
11th List A	24 June	Uganda	Brian Masaba	Italy	Gareth Berg	Kyambogo Cricket Oval, Kampala	Uganda by 7 wickets
12th List A	26 June	Uganda	Brian Masaba	Kenya	Shem Ngoche	Lugogo Stadium, Kampala	Uganda by 7 wickets
13th List A	26 June	Bermuda	Kamau Leverock	Jersey	Charles Perchard	Kyambogo Cricket Oval, Kampala	Jersey by 291 runs
14th List A	27 June	Bermuda	Kamau Leverock	Italy	Gareth Berg	Lugogo Stadium, Kampala	Italy by 10 wickets
15th List A	27 June	Hong Kong	Kinchit Shah	Kenya	Shem Ngoche	Kyambogo Cricket Oval, Kampala	Hong Kong by 5 wickets

=== England in Netherlands ===
2020–2023 ICC Cricket World Cup Super League – ODI series
No.	Date	Home captain	Away captain	Venue	Result
ODI 4413	17 June	Pieter Seelaar	Eoin Morgan	VRA Cricket Ground, Amstelveen	England by 232 runs
ODI 4414	19 June	Scott Edwards	Eoin Morgan	VRA Cricket Ground, Amstelveen	England by 6 wickets
ODI 4417	22 June	Scott Edwards	Jos Buttler	VRA Cricket Ground, Amstelveen	England by 8 wickets

=== India women in Sri Lanka ===
WT20I series
No.	Date	Home captain	Away captain	Venue	Result
WT20I 1145	23 June	Chamari Athapaththu	Harmanpreet Kaur	Rangiri Dambulla International Stadium, Dambulla	India by 34 runs
WT20I 1149	25 June	Chamari Athapaththu	Harmanpreet Kaur	Rangiri Dambulla International Stadium, Dambulla	India by 5 wickets
WT20I 1153	27 June	Chamari Athapaththu	Harmanpreet Kaur	Rangiri Dambulla International Stadium, Dambulla	Sri Lanka by 7 wickets
2022–2025 ICC Women's Championship – WODI series
No.	Date	Home captain	Away captain	Venue	Result
WODI 1281	1 July	Chamari Athapaththu	Harmanpreet Kaur	Pallekele International Cricket Stadium, Kandy	India by 4 wickets
WODI 1282	4 July	Chamari Athapaththu	Harmanpreet Kaur	Pallekele International Cricket Stadium, Kandy	India by 10 wickets
WODI 1283	7 July	Chamari Athapaththu	Harmanpreet Kaur	Pallekele International Cricket Stadium, Kandy	India by 39 runs

=== India in Ireland ===
T20I series
No.	Date	Home captain	Away captain	Venue	Result
T20I 1580	26 June	Andrew Balbirnie	Hardik Pandya	The Village, Dublin	India by 7 wickets
T20I 1586	28 June	Andrew Balbirnie	Hardik Pandya	The Village, Dublin	India by 4 runs

=== South Africa women in England ===
Only WTest
No.	Date	Home captain	Away captain	Venue	Result
WTest 144	27–30 June	Heather Knight	Suné Luus	County Ground, Taunton	Match drawn
WODI series
No.	Date	Home captain	Away captain	Venue	Result
WODI 1284	11 July	Heather Knight	Suné Luus	County Cricket Ground, Northampton	England by 5 wickets
WODI 1285	15 July	Heather Knight	Suné Luus	Bristol County Ground, Bristol	England by 114 runs
WODI 1286	18 July	Heather Knight	Suné Luus	Grace Road, Leicester	England by 109 runs
WT20I series
No.	Date	Home captain	Away captain	Venue	Result
WT20I 1168	21 July	Heather Knight	Suné Luus	County Cricket Ground, Chelmsford	England by 6 wickets
WT20I 1169	23 July	Nat Sciver	Suné Luus	New Road, Worcester	England by 6 wickets
WT20I 1171	25 July	Nat Sciver	Chloe Tryon	County Cricket Ground, Derby	England by 38 runs

== July ==
=== India in England ===
T20I series
No.	Date	Home captain	Away captain	Venue	Result
T20I 1616	7 July	Jos Buttler	Rohit Sharma	Rose Bowl, Southampton	India by 50 runs
T20I 1628	9 July	Jos Buttler	Rohit Sharma	Edgbaston, Birmingham	India by 49 runs
T20I 1631	10 July	Jos Buttler	Rohit Sharma	Trent Bridge, Nottingham	England by 17 runs
ODI series
No.	Date	Home captain	Away captain	Venue	Result
ODI 4424	12 July	Jos Buttler	Rohit Sharma	The Oval, London	India by 10 wickets
ODI 4428	14 July	Jos Buttler	Rohit Sharma	Lord's, London	England by 100 runs
ODI 4433	17 July	Jos Buttler	Rohit Sharma	Old Trafford, Manchester	India by 5 wickets

=== New Zealand in Ireland ===
2020–2023 ICC Cricket World Cup Super League – ODI series
No.	Date	Home captain	Away captain	Venue	Result
ODI 4419	10 July	Andrew Balbirnie	Tom Latham	The Village, Dublin	New Zealand by 1 wicket
ODI 4423	12 July	Andrew Balbirnie	Tom Latham	The Village, Dublin	New Zealand by 3 wickets
ODI 4429	15 July	Andrew Balbirnie	Tom Latham	The Village, Dublin	New Zealand by 1 run
T20I series
No.	Date	Home captain	Away captain	Venue	Result
T20I 1673	18 July	Andrew Balbirnie	Mitchell Santner	Stormont Cricket Ground, Belfast	New Zealand by 31 runs
T20I 1678	20 July	Andrew Balbirnie	Mitchell Santner	Stormont Cricket Ground, Belfast	New Zealand by 88 runs
T20I 1679	22 July	Andrew Balbirnie	Mitchell Santner	Stormont Cricket Ground, Belfast	New Zealand by 6 wickets

=== 2022 Scotland Tri-Nation Series (round 14) ===
2019–2023 ICC Cricket World Cup League 2 – Tri-series
No.	Date	Team 1	Captain 1	Team 2	Captain 2	Venue	Result
ODI 4420	10 July	Scotland	Richie Berrington	Namibia	Gerhard Erasmus	Titwood, Glasgow	Scotland by 77 runs
ODI 4422	11 July	Namibia	Gerhard Erasmus	Nepal	Sandeep Lamichhane	Cambusdoon New Ground, Ayr	Namibia by 40 runs
ODI 4425	13 July	Scotland	Richie Berrington	Nepal	Sandeep Lamichhane	Titwood, Glasgow	Nepal by 5 wickets
ODI 4427	14 July	Scotland	Richie Berrington	Namibia	Gerhard Erasmus	Titwood, Glasgow	Scotland by 3 wickets
ODI 4430	16 July	Namibia	Gerhard Erasmus	Nepal	Sandeep Lamichhane	Cambusdoon New Ground, Ayr	Namibia by 63 runs
ODI 4432	17 July	Scotland	Richie Berrington	Nepal	Sandeep Lamichhane	Titwood, Glasgow	Scotland by 8 wickets

=== Pakistan in Sri Lanka ===
2021–2023 ICC World Test Championship – Test series
No.	Date	Home captain	Away captain	Venue	Result
Test 2472	16–20 July	Dimuth Karunaratne	Babar Azam	Galle International Stadium, Galle	Pakistan by 4 wickets
Test 2473	24–28 July	Dimuth Karunaratne	Babar Azam	Galle International Stadium, Galle	Sri Lanka by 246 runs

=== 2022 Ireland women's Tri-Nation Series ===
WT20I Tri-series
No.	Date	Team 1	Captain 1	Team 2	Captain 2	Venue	Result
WT20I 1164	16 July	Australia	Meg Lanning	Pakistan	Bismah Maroof	Bready Cricket Club Ground, Magheramason	No result
WT20I 1165	17 July	Ireland	Laura Delany	Australia	Meg Lanning	Bready Cricket Club Ground, Magheramason	Australia by 9 wickets
WT20I 1166	19 July	Ireland	Laura Delany	Pakistan	Bismah Maroof	Bready Cricket Club Ground, Magheramason	Pakistan by 13 runs (DLS)
WT20I 1167	21 July	Ireland	Laura Delany	Australia	Meg Lanning	Bready Cricket Club Ground, Magheramason	Australia by 63 runs
WT20I 1170	23 July	Australia	Meg Lanning	Pakistan	Bismah Maroof	Bready Cricket Club Ground, Magheramason	No result
WT20I 1170a	24 July	Ireland	Laura Delany	Pakistan	Bismah Maroof	Bready Cricket Club Ground, Magheramason	Match abandoned

=== South Africa in England ===
ODI series
No.	Date	Home captain	Away captain	Venue	Result
ODI 4434	19 July	Jos Buttler	Keshav Maharaj	Riverside Ground, Chester-le-Street	South Africa by 62 runs
ODI 4435	22 July	Jos Buttler	Keshav Maharaj	Old Trafford, Manchester	England by 118 runs
ODI 4437	24 July	Jos Buttler	Keshav Maharaj	Headingley, Leeds	No result
T20I series
No.	Date	Home captain	Away captain	Venue	Result
T20I 1693	27 July	Jos Buttler	David Miller	County Ground, Bristol	England by 41 runs
T20I 1698	28 July	Jos Buttler	David Miller	Sophia Gardens, Cardiff	South Africa by 58 runs
T20I 1717	31 July	Jos Buttler	David Miller	Rose Bowl, Southampton	South Africa by 90 runs
Basil D'Oliveira Trophy, 2021–2023 ICC World Test Championship – Test series
No.	Date	Home captain	Away captain	Venue	Result
Test 2474	17–21 August	Ben Stokes	Dean Elgar	Lord's, London	South Africa by an innings and 12 runs
Test 2475	25–29 August	Ben Stokes	Dean Elgar	Old Trafford, Manchester	England by an innings and 85 runs
Test 2476	8–12 September	Ben Stokes	Dean Elgar	The Oval, London	England by 9 wickets

=== India in West Indies and United States ===
ODI series
No.	Date	Home captain	Away captain	Venue	Result
ODI 4436	22 July	Nicholas Pooran	Shikhar Dhawan	Queen's Park Oval, Trinidad and Tobago	India by 3 runs
ODI 4438	24 July	Nicholas Pooran	Shikhar Dhawan	Queen's Park Oval, Trinidad and Tobago	India by 2 wickets
ODI 4439	27 July	Nicholas Pooran	Shikhar Dhawan	Queen's Park Oval, Trinidad and Tobago	India by 119 runs (DLS)
T20I series
No.	Date	Home captain	Away captain	Venue	Result
T20I 1702	29 July	Nicholas Pooran	Rohit Sharma	Brian Lara Cricket Academy, Trinidad and Tobago	India by 68 runs
T20I 1718	1 August	Nicholas Pooran	Rohit Sharma	Warner Park, St. Kitts and Nevis	West Indies by 5 wickets
T20I 1720	2 August	Nicholas Pooran	Rohit Sharma	Warner Park, St. Kitts and Nevis	India by 7 wickets
T20I 1725	6 August	Nicholas Pooran	Rohit Sharma	Central Broward Regional Park, Lauderhill	India by 59 runs
T20I 1726	7 August	Nicholas Pooran	Hardik Pandya	Central Broward Regional Park, Lauderhill	India by 88 runs

=== New Zealand in Scotland ===
T20I series
No.	Date	Home captain	Away captain	Venue	Result
T20I 1692	27 July	Richie Berrington	Mitchell Santner	The Grange Club, Edinburgh	New Zealand by 68 runs
T20I 1701	29 July	Richie Berrington	Mitchell Santner	The Grange Club, Edinburgh	New Zealand by 102 runs
Only ODI
No.	Date	Home captain	Away captain	Venue	Result
ODI 4440	31 July	Richie Berrington	Mitchell Santner	The Grange Club, Edinburgh	New Zealand by 7 wickets

=== 2022 Canada Cricket World Cup Challenge League A ===
2019–2022 ICC Cricket World Cup Challenge League – List A series
No.	Date	Team 1	Captain 1	Team 2	Captain 2	Venue	Result
1st List A	27 July	Canada	Navneet Dhaliwal	Denmark	Hamid Shah	Maple Leaf North-West Ground, King City	Canada by 74 runs
2nd List A	28 July	Qatar	Mohammed Rizlan	Singapore	Amjad Mahboob	Maple Leaf North-West Ground, King City	Singapore by 7 runs (DLS)
3rd List A	28 July	Malaysia	Ahmad Faiz	Vanuatu	Andrew Mansale	Maple Leaf North-East Ground, King City	Vanuatu by 2 wickets
4th List A	30 July	Denmark	Hamid Shah	Vanuatu	Andrew Mansale	Maple Leaf North-West Ground, King City	Denmark by 127 runs
5th List A	30 July	Canada	Navneet Dhaliwal	Singapore	Amjad Mahboob	Maple Leaf North-East Ground, King City	Canada by 6 wickets
6th List A	31 July	Canada	Navneet Dhaliwal	Malaysia	Ahmad Faiz	Maple Leaf North-West Ground, King City	Canada by 121 runs
7th List A	31 July	Denmark	Hamid Shah	Qatar	Mohammed Rizlan	Maple Leaf North-East Ground, King City	Denmark by 87 runs
8th List A	2 August	Qatar	Mohammed Rizlan	Vanuatu	Andrew Mansale	Maple Leaf North-West Ground, King City	Qatar by 96 runs
9th List A	2 August	Malaysia	Ahmad Faiz	Singapore	Amjad Mahboob	Maple Leaf North-East Ground, King City	Singapore by 4 wickets
10th List A	3 August	Denmark	Hamid Shah	Singapore	Amjad Mahboob	Maple Leaf North-West Ground, King City	Denmark by 1 run
11th List A	3 August	Canada	Navneet Dhaliwal	Qatar	Mohammed Rizlan	Maple Leaf North-East Ground, King City	Canada by 184 runs
12th List A	5 August	Canada	Navneet Dhaliwal	Vanuatu	Andrew Mansale	Maple Leaf North-West Ground, King City	Canada by 204 runs
13th List A	5 August	Denmark	Hamid Shah	Malaysia	Ahmad Faiz	Maple Leaf North-East Ground, King City	Denmark by 91 runs
14th List A	6 August	Malaysia	Ahmad Faiz	Qatar	Mohammed Rizlan	Maple Leaf North-West Ground, King City	Qatar by 4 runs
15th List A	6 August	Singapore	Amjad Mahboob	Vanuatu	Andrew Mansale	Maple Leaf North-East Ground, King City	Singapore by 6 wickets

=== Cricket at the 2022 Commonwealth Games ===
Group stage
No.	Date	Team 1	Captain 1	Team 2	Captain 2	Venue	Result
WT20I 1173	29 July	Australia	Meg Lanning	India	Harmanpreet Kaur	Edgbaston, Birmingham	Australia by 3 wickets
WT20I 1175	29 July	Barbados	Hayley Matthews	Pakistan	Bismah Maroof	Edgbaston, Birmingham	Barbados by 15 runs
WT20I 1177	30 July	New Zealand	Sophie Devine	South Africa	Suné Luus	Edgbaston, Birmingham	New Zealand by 13 runs
WT20I 1179	30 July	England	Nat Sciver	Sri Lanka	Chamari Athapaththu	Edgbaston, Birmingham	England by 5 wickets
WT20I 1181	31 July	India	Harmanpreet Kaur	Pakistan	Bismah Maroof	Edgbaston, Birmingham	India by 8 wickets
WT20I 1183	31 July	Australia	Meg Lanning	Barbados	Hayley Matthews	Edgbaston, Birmingham	Australia by 9 wickets
WT20I 1184	2 August	England	Heather Knight	South Africa	Suné Luus	Edgbaston, Birmingham	England by 26 runs
WT20I 1185	2 August	New Zealand	Sophie Devine	Sri Lanka	Chamari Athapaththu	Edgbaston, Birmingham	New Zealand by 45 runs
WT20I 1186	3 August	Australia	Meg Lanning	Pakistan	Bismah Maroof	Edgbaston, Birmingham	Australia by 44 runs
WT20I 1187	3 August	Barbados	Hayley Matthews	India	Harmanpreet Kaur	Edgbaston, Birmingham	India by 100 runs
WT20I 1188	4 August	South Africa	Suné Luus	Sri Lanka	Chamari Athapaththu	Edgbaston, Birmingham	South Africa by 10 wickets
WT20I 1189	4 August	England	Heather Knight	New Zealand	Sophie Devine	Edgbaston, Birmingham	England by 7 wickets
Play-offs
WT20I 1190	6 August	England	Heather Knight	India	Harmanpreet Kaur	Edgbaston, Birmingham	India by 4 runs
WT20I 1191	6 August	Australia	Meg Lanning	New Zealand	Sophie Devine	Edgbaston, Birmingham	Australia won by 5 wickets
WT20I 1192	7 August	England	Nat Sciver	New Zealand	Sophie Devine	Edgbaston, Birmingham	New Zealand by 8 wickets
WT20I 1193	7 August	India	Harmanpreet Kaur	Australia	Meg Lanning	Edgbaston, Birmingham	Australia by 9 runs

=== Bangladesh in Zimbabwe ===
T20I series
No.	Date	Home captain	Away captain	Venue	Result
T20I 1706	30 July	Craig Ervine	Nurul Hasan	Harare Sports Club, Harare	Zimbabwe by 17 runs
T20I 1713	31 July	Craig Ervine	Nurul Hasan	Harare Sports Club, Harare	Bangladesh by 7 wickets
T20I 1719	2 August	Craig Ervine	Mosaddek Hossain	Harare Sports Club, Harare	Zimbabwe by 10 runs
ODI series
No.	Date	Home captain	Away captain	Venue	Result
ODI 4441	5 August	Regis Chakabva	Tamim Iqbal	Harare Sports Club, Harare	Zimbabwe by 5 wickets
ODI 4442	7 August	Regis Chakabva	Tamim Iqbal	Harare Sports Club, Harare	Zimbabwe by 5 wickets
ODI 4443	10 August	Sikandar Raza	Tamim Iqbal	Harare Sports Club, Harare	Bangladesh by 105 runs

== August ==
=== South Africa vs Ireland in England ===
T20I series
No.	Date	Home captain	Away captain	Venue	Result
T20I 1721	3 August	Andrew Balbirnie	Keshav Maharaj	County Ground, Bristol	South Africa by 21 runs
T20I 1724	5 August	Andrew Balbirnie	David Miller	County Ground, Bristol	South Africa by 44 runs

=== 2022 Jersey Cricket World Cup Challenge League B ===
2019–2022 ICC Cricket World Cup Challenge League – List A series
No.	Date	Team 1	Captain 1	Team 2	Captain 2	Venue	Result
1st List A	4 August	Bermuda	Kamau Leverock	Italy	Gareth Berg	Grainville Cricket Ground, St Saviour	Italy by 188 runs
2nd List A	5 August	Hong Kong	Nizakat Khan	Kenya	Rakep Patel	Grainville Cricket Ground, St Saviour	Hong Kong by 51 runs
3rd List A	5 August	Jersey	Charles Perchard	Uganda	Deusdedit Muhumuza	Farmers Cricket Club Ground, St Martin	Jersey by 5 wickets
4th List A	7 August	Italy	Gareth Berg	Uganda	Deusdedit Muhumuza	Grainville Cricket Ground, St Saviour	Uganda by 7 wickets
5th List A	7 August	Bermuda	Kamau Leverock	Hong Kong	Nizakat Khan	Farmers Cricket Club Ground, St Martin	Hong Kong by 119 runs
6th List A	8 August	Jersey	Charles Perchard	Bermuda	Kamau Leverock	Grainville Cricket Ground, St Saviour	Jersey by 206 runs
7th List A	8 August	Italy	Gareth Berg	Kenya	Shem Ngoche	Farmers Cricket Club Ground, St Martin	Kenya by 24 runs
8th List A	10 August	Kenya	Shem Ngoche	Uganda	Deusdedit Muhumuza	Grainville Cricket Ground, St Saviour	Kenya by 36 runs
9th List A	10 August	Jersey	Charles Perchard	Hong Kong	Nizakat Khan	Farmers Cricket Club Ground, St Martin	Jersey by 7 wickets
10th List A	11 August	Hong Kong	Nizakat Khan	Italy	Gareth Berg	Grainville Cricket Ground, St Saviour	Italy by 4 runs
11th List A	11 August	Bermuda	Kamau Leverock	Kenya	Shem Ngoche	Farmers Cricket Club Ground, St Martin	Kenya by 7 wickets
12th List A	13 August	Bermuda	Kamau Leverock	Uganda	Deusdedit Muhumuza	Grainville Cricket Ground, St Saviour	Uganda by 153 runs
13th List A	13 August	Jersey	Charles Perchard	Italy	Gareth Berg	Farmers Cricket Club Ground, St Martin	Jersey by 145 runs
14th List A	14 August	Jersey	Charles Perchard	Kenya	Shem Ngoche	Grainville Cricket Ground, St Saviour	Kenya by 4 wickets
15th List A	14 August	Hong Kong	Nizakat Khan	Uganda	Deusdedit Muhumuza	Farmers Cricket Club Ground, St Martin	Uganda by 218 runs

=== New Zealand in the Netherlands ===
T20I series
No.	Date	Home captain	Away captain	Venue	Result
T20I 1722	4 August	Scott Edwards	Mitchell Santner	Sportpark Westvliet, Voorburg	New Zealand by 16 runs
T20I 1723	5 August	Scott Edwards	Mitchell Santner	Sportpark Westvliet, Voorburg	New Zealand by 8 wickets

=== Afghanistan in Ireland ===
T20I series
No.	Date	Home captain	Away captain	Venue	Result
T20I 1727	9 August	Andrew Balbirnie	Mohammad Nabi	Stormont Cricket Ground, Belfast	Ireland by 7 wickets
T20I 1729	11 August	Andrew Balbirnie	Mohammad Nabi	Stormont Cricket Ground, Belfast	Ireland by 5 wickets
T20I 1731	12 August	Andrew Balbirnie	Mohammad Nabi	Stormont Cricket Ground, Belfast	Afghanistan by 22 runs
T20I 1736	15 August	Andrew Balbirnie	Mohammad Nabi	Stormont Cricket Ground, Belfast	Afghanistan by 27 runs
T20I 1738	17 August	Andrew Balbirnie	Mohammad Nabi	Stormont Cricket Ground, Belfast	Ireland by 7 wickets (DLS)

=== 2022 Scotland Tri-Nation Series (round 15) ===
2019–2023 ICC Cricket World Cup League 2 – Tri-series
No.	Date	Team 1	Captain 1	Team 2	Captain 2	Venue	Result
ODI 4444	10 August	Scotland	Matthew Cross	United Arab Emirates	Ahmed Raza	Mannofield Park, Aberdeen	Scotland by 64 runs
ODI 4445	11 August	United Arab Emirates	Ahmed Raza	United States	Monank Patel	Mannofield Park, Aberdeen	United States by 1 wicket
ODI 4446	13 August	Scotland	Matthew Cross	United States	Monank Patel	Mannofield Park, Aberdeen	Scotland by 5 wickets
ODI 4447	14 August	Scotland	Matthew Cross	United Arab Emirates	Ahmed Raza	Mannofield Park, Aberdeen	Scotland by 86 runs
ODI 4448a	16 August	United Arab Emirates	Ahmed Raza	United States	Monank Patel	Mannofield Park, Aberdeen	Match abandoned
ODI 4449	17 August	Scotland	Matthew Cross	United States	Monank Patel	Mannofield Park, Aberdeen	United States by 2 wickets

=== New Zealand in West Indies ===
T20I series
No.	Date	Home captain	Away captain	Venue	Result
T20I 1728	10 August	Nicholas Pooran	Kane Williamson	Sabina Park, Jamaica	New Zealand by 13 runs
T20I 1732	12 August	Nicholas Pooran	Kane Williamson	Sabina Park, Jamaica	New Zealand by 90 runs
T20I 1735	14 August	Rovman Powell	Kane Williamson	Sabina Park, Jamaica	West Indies by 8 wickets
2020–2023 ICC Cricket World Cup Super League – ODI series
No.	Date	Home captain	Away captain	Venue	Result
ODI 4450	17 August	Nicholas Pooran	Kane Williamson	Kensington Oval, Barbados	West Indies by 5 wickets
ODI 4453	19 August	Nicholas Pooran	Tom Latham	Kensington Oval, Barbados	New Zealand by 50 runs (DLS)
ODI 4456	21 August	Nicholas Pooran	Tom Latham	Kensington Oval, Barbados	New Zealand by 5 wickets

=== Pakistan in Netherlands ===
2020–2023 ICC Cricket World Cup Super League – ODI series
No.	Date	Home captain	Away captain	Venue	Result
ODI 4448	16 August	Scott Edwards	Babar Azam	Hazelaarweg Stadion, Rotterdam	Pakistan by 16 runs
ODI 4452	18 August	Scott Edwards	Babar Azam	Hazelaarweg Stadion, Rotterdam	Pakistan by 7 wickets
ODI 4455	21 August	Scott Edwards	Babar Azam	Hazelaarweg Stadion, Rotterdam	Pakistan by 9 runs

=== India in Zimbabwe ===
2020–2023 ICC Cricket World Cup Super League – ODI series
No.	Date	Home captain	Away captain	Venue	Result
ODI 4451	18 August	Regis Chakabva	KL Rahul	Harare Sports Club, Harare	India by 10 wickets
ODI 4454	20 August	Regis Chakabva	KL Rahul	Harare Sports Club, Harare	India by 5 wickets
ODI 4457	22 August	Regis Chakabva	KL Rahul	Harare Sports Club, Harare	India by 13 runs

=== Ireland women in the Netherlands ===
WODI series
No.	Date	Home captain	Away captain	Venue	Result
WODI 1287	22 August	Babette de Leede	Laura Delany	VRA Cricket Ground, Amstelveen	Ireland by 5 wickets
WODI 1288	24 August	Babette de Leede	Laura Delany	VRA Cricket Ground, Amstelveen	Ireland by 210 runs
WODI 1289	26 August	Babette de Leede	Laura Delany	Sportpark Westvliet, The Hague	Ireland by 8 wickets

=== 2022 Asia Cup ===
Pos	Team	Pld	W	L	NR	Pts	NRR
1	India	2	2	0	0	4	1.096
2	Pakistan	2	1	1	0	2	3.811
3	Hong Kong	2	0	2	0	0	−4.875

Source: ESPNcricinfo

Advanced to the Super Four

Pos	Team	Pld	W	L	NR	Pts	NRR
1	Afghanistan	2	2	0	0	4	2.467
2	Sri Lanka	2	1	1	0	2	−2.233
3	Bangladesh	2	0	2	0	0	−0.576

Source: ESPNcricinfo

Advanced to the Super Four

Round-robin
No.	Date	Team 1	Captain 1	Team 2	Captain 2	Venue	Result
T20I 1748	27 August	Afghanistan	Mohammad Nabi	Sri Lanka	Dasun Shanaka	Dubai International Cricket Stadium, Dubai	Afghanistan by 8 wickets
T20I 1750	28 August	India	Rohit Sharma	Pakistan	Babar Azam	Dubai International Cricket Stadium, Dubai	India by 5 wickets
T20I 1753	30 August	Afghanistan	Mohammad Nabi	Bangladesh	Shakib Al Hasan	Sharjah Cricket Stadium, Sharjah	Afghanistan by 7 wickets
T20I 1754	31 August	Hong Kong	Nizakat Khan	India	Rohit Sharma	Dubai International Cricket Stadium, Dubai	India by 40 runs
T20I 1755	1 September	Bangladesh	Shakib Al Hasan	Sri Lanka	Dasun Shanaka	Dubai International Cricket Stadium, Dubai	Sri Lanka by 2 wickets
T20I 1756	2 September	Hong Kong	Nizakat Khan	Pakistan	Babar Azam	Sharjah Cricket Stadium, Sharjah	Pakistan by 155 runs

Pos	Team	Pld	W	L	NR	Pts	NRR
1	Sri Lanka	3	3	0	0	6	0.701
2	Pakistan	3	2	1	0	4	−0.279
3	India	3	1	2	0	2	1.607
4	Afghanistan	3	0	3	0	0	−2.006

Source: ESPNcricinfo

Advanced to the final

Super Four
No.	Date	Team 1	Captain 1	Team 2	Captain 2	Venue	Result
T20I 1757	3 September	Afghanistan	Mohammad Nabi	Sri Lanka	Dasun Shanaka	Sharjah Cricket Stadium, Sharjah	Sri Lanka by 4 wickets
T20I 1758	4 September	India	Rohit Sharma	Pakistan	Babar Azam	Dubai International Cricket Stadium, Dubai	Pakistan by 5 wickets
T20I 1759	6 September	India	Rohit Sharma	Sri Lanka	Dasun Shanaka	Dubai International Cricket Stadium, Dubai	Sri Lanka by 6 wickets
T20I 1760	7 September	Afghanistan	Mohammad Nabi	Pakistan	Babar Azam	Sharjah Cricket Stadium, Sharjah	Pakistan by 1 wicket
T20I 1761	8 September	Afghanistan	Mohammad Nabi	India	KL Rahul	Dubai International Cricket Stadium, Dubai	India by 101 runs
T20I 1764	9 September	Pakistan	Babar Azam	Sri Lanka	Dasun Shanaka	Dubai International Cricket Stadium, Dubai	Sri Lanka by 5 wickets
Final
T20I 1769	11 September	Pakistan	Babar Azam	Sri Lanka	Dasun Shanaka	Dubai International Cricket Stadium, Dubai	Sri Lanka by 23 runs

=== Zimbabwe in Australia ===
2020–2023 ICC Cricket World Cup Super League – ODI series
No.	Date	Home captain	Away captain	Venue	Result
ODI 4458	28 August	Aaron Finch	Regis Chakabva	Riverway Stadium, Townsville	Australia by 5 wickets
ODI 4459	31 August	Aaron Finch	Regis Chakabva	Riverway Stadium, Townsville	Australia by 8 wickets
ODI 4460	3 September	Aaron Finch	Regis Chakabva	Riverway Stadium, Townsville	Zimbabwe by 3 wickets

== September ==
=== Ireland women in Scotland ===
WT20I series
No.	Date	Home captain	Away captain	Venue	Result
WT20I 1202	5 September	Sarah Bryce	Laura Delany	The Grange Club, Edinburgh	Ireland by 8 wickets
WT20I 1203	6 September	Sarah Bryce	Laura Delany	The Grange Club, Edinburgh	Ireland by 16 runs (DLS)
WT20I 1203a	8 September	Kathryn Bryce	Laura Delany	The Grange Club, Edinburgh	Match abandoned

=== India women in England ===
WT20I series
No.	Date	Home captain	Away captain	Venue	Result
WT20I 1209	10 September	Amy Jones	Harmanpreet Kaur	Riverside Ground, Chester-le-Street	England by 9 wickets
WT20I 1216	13 September	Amy Jones	Harmanpreet Kaur	County Cricket Ground, Derby	India by 8 wickets
WT20I 1217	15 September	Amy Jones	Harmanpreet Kaur	Bristol County Ground, Bristol	England by 7 wickets
2022–2025 ICC Women's Championship – WODI series
No.	Date	Home captain	Away captain	Venue	Result
WODI 1290	18 September	Amy Jones	Harmanpreet Kaur	County Cricket Ground, Hove	India by 7 wickets
WODI 1292	21 September	Amy Jones	Harmanpreet Kaur	St Lawrence Ground, Canterbury	India by 88 runs
WODI 1294	24 September	Amy Jones	Harmanpreet Kaur	Lord's, London	India by 16 runs

== See also ==
- Associate international cricket in 2022
