= 2022 Ireland women's Tri-Nation Series =

International cricket tour

- Date: 16–24 July 2022
- Location: Ireland
- Result: Australia won the tournament
- Player of the series: (Australia) Alana King
Teams
Australia	Ireland	Pakistan
Captains
Meg Lanning	Laura Delany	Bismah Maroof
Most runs
Meg Lanning (113)	Gaby Lewis (54)	Muneeba Ali (52)
Most wickets
Alana King (8)	Four bowlers took two wickets each (Note: Georgina Dempsey, Laura Delany, Jane Maguire and Arlene Kelly all took two wickets each.)	Three bowlers took one wicket each (Note: Tuba Hassan, Fatima Sana and Nida Dar all took two wickets each.)

The 2022 Ireland women's Tri-Nation Series was a cricket tournament that took place in Ireland in July 2022. It was a tri-nation series between Australia women, Ireland women and the Pakistan women cricket teams, with the matches played as Women's Twenty20 International (WT20I) fixtures. Australia and Pakistan used the series as preparation for the cricket tournament at the 2022 Commonwealth Games in Birmingham, England.

The opening match, between Australia and Pakistan, was initially delayed due to rain and reduced to 19 overs per side. Pakistan were reduced to 56/6, with Alana King taking three wickets in one over, before the rain returned and the match ended in a no result. The second WT20I was between the hosts Ireland and Australia. Australia won by nine wickets, inside 13 overs, with Alana King once again taking three wickets in the match. Ireland played Pakistan in the third match, which was also shortened due to rain. Pakistan went on to win by 13 runs, after Ireland failed to chase a revised target of 97 runs.

Ireland played Australia in the fourth match of the series, with Australia winning by 63 runs. Megan Schutt took her 100th wicket in WT20I cricket, with Tahlia McGrath being named player of the match for the fourth consecutive match she has batted in. Australia and Pakistan played each other in the fifth match, with their fixture again being washed out, after Jess Jonassen had taken 4/17 to restrict Pakstian to 94/8. If four more balls had been bowled, then Australia would have won under the Duckworth–Lewis–Stern method. The sixth and final match, between Ireland and Australia, was washed out with no play being possible. Therefore Australia won the tournament with Alana King being named as the player of the series.

== Squads ==
Australia	Ireland	Pakistan
Meg Lanning (c); Rachael Haynes (vc); Darcie Brown; Nicola Carey; Ashleigh Gardner; Heather Graham; Grace Harris; Alyssa Healy; Jess Jonassen; Alana King; Tahlia McGrath; Beth Mooney; Ellyse Perry; Megan Schutt; Annabel Sutherland; Amanda-Jade Wellington	Laura Delany (c); Ava Canning; Rachel Delaney; Georgina Dempsey; Amy Hunter; ~~Shauna Kavanagh~~; Arlene Kelly; Gaby Lewis; Sophie MacMahon; Jane Maguire; Cara Murray; Leah Paul; Orla Prendergast; Rebecca Stokell; Mary Waldron	Bismah Maroof (c); Muneeba Ali (wk); Anam Amin; Aiman Anwer; Diana Baig; Nida Dar; Gull Feroza (wk); Tuba Hassan; Kainat Imtiaz; Sadia Iqbal; Iram Javed; Ayesha Naseem; Aliya Riaz; Fatima Sana; Omaima Sohail

Ghulam Fatima, Sadaf Shamas and Umm-e-Hani were also named as reserve players in Pakistan's squad. Australia's Jess Jonassen was ruled out of the start of the series after testing positive for COVID-19. As a result, Heather Graham was added to their squad as cover. Prior to the series, Shauna Kavanagh withdrew herself from Ireland's squad for personal reasons, with Mary Waldron named as her replacement.

== Points table ==
Pos	Team	Pld	W	L	T	NR	Pts	NRR
1	Australia	4	2	0	0	2	12	3.230
2	Pakistan	4	1	0	0	3	10	0.929
3	Ireland	4	0	3	0	1	2	−2.561

Source: ESPN Cricinfo

== WT20I series ==
=== 1st WT20I ===
16 July 2022
16:00
Scorecard

Pakistan; 56/6 (8 overs)	v	Australia
Iram Javed 12 (10); Alana King 3/8 (1 over)

No result
Bready Cricket Club Ground, Magheramason
Umpires: Mark Hawthorne (Ire) and Aidan Seaver (Ire)

- Pakistan Women won the toss and elected to bat.
- No further play was possible due to rain.

=== 2nd WT20I ===
17 July 2022
16:00
Scorecard

Ireland; 99/8 (20 overs)	v	Australia; 103/1 (12.5 overs)
Rebecca Stokell 22 (33); Alana King 3/9 (4 overs)		Beth Mooney 45* (33); Arlene Kelly 1/19 (3 overs)

Australia Women won by 9 wickets
Bready Cricket Club Ground, Magheramason
Umpires: Mark Hawthorne (Ire) and Jonathan Kennedy (Ire)
Player of the match: Alana King (Aus)

- Australia Women won the toss and elected to field.

=== 3rd WT20I ===
19 July 2022
16:00
Scorecard

Pakistan; 92/5 (14 overs)	v	Ireland; 83/6 (14 overs)
Muneeba Ali 29 (24); Jane Maguire 2/14 (3 overs)		Gaby Lewis 47 (41); Tuba Hassan 1/10 (3 overs)

Pakistan Women won by 13 runs (DLS method)
Bready Cricket Club Ground, Magheramason
Umpires: Mark Hawthorne (Ire) and Aidan Seaver (Ire)
Player of the match: Nida Dar (Pak)

- Pakistan Women won the toss and elected to bat.
- Ireland Women were set a revised target of 97 runs from 14 overs due to rain.

=== 4th WT20I ===
21 July 2022
16:00
Scorecard

Australia; 182/4 (20 overs)	v	Ireland; 119/7 (20 overs)
Meg Lanning 74 (49); Georgina Dempsey 2/35 (4 overs)		Orla Prendergast 25 (22); Alana King 2/11 (3 overs)

Australia Women won by 63 runs
Bready Cricket Club Ground, Magheramason
Umpires: Mark Hawthorne (Ire) and Jonathan Kennedy (Ire)
Player of the match: Tahlia McGrath (Aus)

- Ireland Women won the toss and elected to field.
- Megan Schutt (Aus) took her 100th wicket in WT20Is.

=== 5th WT20I ===
23 July 2022
16:00
Scorecard

Pakistan; 94/8 (20 overs)	v	Australia; 28/0 (4.2 overs)
Bismah Maroof 32* (39); Jess Jonassen 4/17 (4 overs)		Alyssa Healy 12* (14)

No result
Bready Cricket Club Ground, Magheramason
Umpires: Mark Hawthorne (Ire) and Aidan Seaver (Ire)

- Pakistan Women won the toss and elected to bat.
- No further play was possible due to rain.

=== 6th WT20I ===
24 July 2022
16:00
Scorecard

Ireland	v	Pakistan

Match abandoned
Bready Cricket Club Ground, Magheramason
Umpires: Mark Hawthorne (Ire) and Jonathan Kennedy (Ire)

- No toss.
- No play was possible due to rain.
