= England women's cricket team against Pakistan in Malaysia in 2019–20 =

International cricket tour

	Pakistan women	England women
- Dates: 9 – 20 December 2019
Captains	Bismah Maroof	Heather Knight

One Day International series
- Results: England women won the 3-match series 2–0
Most runs	Bismah Maroof (140)	Tammy Beaumont (128)
Most wickets	Rameen Shamim (3)	Sarah Glenn (8)
- Player of the series: Heather Knight (Eng)

Twenty20 International series
- Results: England women won the 3-match series 3–0
Most runs	Bismah Maroof (86)	Amy Jones (179)
Most wickets	Nida Dar (4)	Sophie Ecclestone (6)
- Player of the series: Amy Jones (Eng)

The England women's cricket team played the Pakistan women's cricket team in Malaysia in December 2019. The tour consisted of three Women's One Day Internationals (WODIs), which formed part of the 2017–20 ICC Women's Championship, and three Women's Twenty20 Internationals (WT20Is). All of the matches were played at the Kinrara Oval in Kuala Lumpur. Pakistan have played England eight times previously in WODI matches, without recording a win. In WT20Is, the teams have faced each other ten times previously, with England winning nine of those matches.

Pakistan had previously played a home series in Malaysia as part of the 2017–20 ICC Women's Championship, against Australia, in October 2018. Ahead of the tour, the Pakistan Cricket Board (PCB) confirmed that Bismah Maroof would continue as captain of the team for the matches. Sana Mir, Pakistan's most capped player in women's cricket, announced that she had taken a break from international cricket, and missed the tour.

England won the WODI series, after taking an unassailable lead with wins in the first two matches. The final match finished as a no result due to rain, therefore England won the series 2–0. England also won the first two WT20I matches to secure a series win. England won the third and final match by 24 runs to win the series 3–0.

== Squads ==
WODIs		WT20Is	
Pakistan	England	Pakistan	England
Bismah Maroof (c); Sidra Ameen; Anam Amin; Diana Baig; Nida Dar; Kaynat Hafeez; Javeria Khan; Nahida Khan; Sidra Nawaz; Aliya Riaz; Fatima Sana; Nashra Sandhu; Syeda Aroob Shah; Rameen Shamim; Omaima Sohail	Heather Knight (c); Tammy Beaumont; Katherine Brunt; Kate Cross; Freya Davies; Sophie Ecclestone; Sarah Glenn; Kirstie Gordon; Amy Jones (wk); Nat Sciver; Anya Shrubsole; Mady Villiers; Fran Wilson; Lauren Winfield; Danni Wyatt	Bismah Maroof (c); Anam Amin; Diana Baig; Nida Dar; Sadia Iqbal; Iram Javed; Javeria Khan; Nahida Khan; Sidra Nawaz; Aliya Riaz; Fatima Sana; Syeda Aroob Shah; Rameen Shamim; Omaima Sohail; Ayesha Zafar	Heather Knight (c); Tammy Beaumont; Katherine Brunt; Kate Cross; Freya Davies; Sophie Ecclestone; Sarah Glenn; Kirstie Gordon; Amy Jones (wk); Nat Sciver; Anya Shrubsole; Mady Villiers; Fran Wilson; Lauren Winfield; Danni Wyatt

== WODI series ==
=== 1st WODI ===
ICC Women's Championship
9 December 2019
09:30
Scorecard

England; 284/6 (50 overs)	v	Pakistan; 209 (44.4 overs)
Danni Wyatt 110 (95); Rameen Shamim 3/61 (10 overs)		Bismah Maroof 69 (94); Kate Cross 4/32 (7 overs)

England Women won by 75 runs
Kinrara Oval, Kuala Lumpur
Umpires: Rashid Riaz (Pak) and Asif Yaqoob (Pak)
Player of the match: Danni Wyatt (Eng)

- England Women won the toss and elected to bat.
- Rameen Shamim (Pak) and Sarah Glenn (Eng) both made their WODI debuts.
- Danni Wyatt (Eng) scored her first century in WODIs.
- Katherine Brunt (Eng) took her 150th wicket in WODIs.
- Points: England Women 2, Pakistan Women 0.

=== 2nd WODI ===
ICC Women's Championship
12 December 2019
09:30
Scorecard

England; 327/4 (50 overs)	v	Pakistan; 200 (44.5 overs)
Nat Sciver 100* (85); Nida Dar 2/67 (9 overs)		Bismah Maroof 64 (65); Anya Shrubsole 2/31 (7 overs)

England Women won by 127 runs
Kinrara Oval, Kuala Lumpur
Umpires: Rashid Riaz (Pak) and Asif Yaqoob (Pak)
Player of the match: Heather Knight (Eng)

- England Women won the toss and elected to bat.
- Heather Knight (Eng) played in her 100th WODI.
- Points: England Women 2, Pakistan Women 0.

=== 3rd WODI ===
ICC Women's Championship
14 December 2019
09:30
Scorecard

Pakistan; 145/8 (37.4 overs)	v	England
Nahida Khan 55 (59); Sarah Glenn 4/18 (8 overs)

No result
Kinrara Oval, Kuala Lumpur
Umpires: Rashid Riaz (Pak) and Asif Yaqoob (Pak)

- England Women won the toss and elected to field.
- Rain during Pakistan Women's innings prevented any further play.
- Kaynat Hafeez (Pak) and Freya Davies (Eng) both are made their WODI debuts.
- Points: England Women 1, Pakistan Women 1.

== WT20I series ==
=== 1st WT20I ===
17 December 2019
10:00
Scorecard

England; 154/4 (20 overs)	v	Pakistan; 125 (18.4 overs)
Amy Jones 53 (39); Nida Dar 2/30 (4 overs)		Bismah Maroof 60 (58); Nat Sciver 2/12 (3 overs)

England Women won by 29 runs
Kinrara Oval, Kuala Lumpur
Umpires: Ghaffar Kazmi (Pak) and Khalid Mahmood (Pak)
Player of the match: Amy Jones (Eng)

- Pakistan Women won the toss and elected to field.
- Syeda Aroob Shah (Pak) and Sarah Glenn (Eng) both made their WT20I debuts.

=== 2nd WT20I ===
19 December 2019
10:00
Scorecard

England; 185/5 (20 overs)	v	Pakistan; 101/9 (20 overs)
Amy Jones 89 (52); Anam Amin 2/30 (4 overs)		Iram Javed 38 (35); Sophie Ecclestone 2/5 (3 overs)

England Women won by 84 runs
Kinrara Oval, Kuala Lumpur
Umpires: Ghaffar Kazmi (Pak) and Khalid Mahmood (Pak)
Player of the match: Amy Jones (Eng)

- England Women won the toss and elected to bat.
- Danni Wyatt (Eng) played in her 100th WT20I.

=== 3rd WT20I ===
20 December 2019
10:00
Scorecard

England; 170/3 (20 overs)	v	Pakistan; 144/5 (20 overs)
Heather Knight 43 (31); Diana Baig 2/28 (4 overs)		Javeria Khan 57* (46); Sarah Glenn 2/12 (3 overs)

England women won by 26 runs
Kinrara Oval, Kuala Lumpur
Umpires: Ghaffar Kazmi (Pak) and Khalid Mahmood (Pak)
Player of the match: Heather Knight (Eng)

- England Women won the toss and elected to bat.
