= Pakistan Education Board women's cricket team =

Pakistani women's cricket team

Pakistan Education Board Women
Personnel
- Captain: Anam Amin

Team information
- Founded: Unknown First recorded match: 2010

History
- NWCC wins: 0

The Pakistan Education Board women's cricket team is a Pakistani women's cricket team, sponsored by the Pakistan Education Board, that plays in domestic competitions. They competed in the National Women's Cricket Championship from 2009–10 to 2012–13.

== History ==
Pakistan Education Board competed in the National Women's Cricket Championship between 2009–10 and 2012–13. In the 2011–12 and 2012–13 seasons, they finished second in their group, winning three matches in the former season and two in the latter.

== Players ==
=== Notable players ===
The players who played for Pakistan Education Board and for Pakistan internationally are listed below, in order of first international appearance (given in brackets):

- (Pakistan) Anam Amin (2014)
- (Pakistan) Sidra Nawaz (2014)
- (Pakistan) Ghulam Fatima (2017)
- (Pakistan) Natalia Pervaiz (2017)
- (Pakistan) Fareeha Mehmood (2018)
- (Pakistan) Kaynat Hafeez (2019)

== Seasons ==
=== National Women's Cricket Championship ===
Season	Division	League standings								Notes
Season	Division	P	W	L	T	A/C	Pts	NRR	Pos	Notes
2009–10	Zone B	4	0	4	0	0	0	–3.200	5th	
2011–12	Zone B	4	3	1	0	0	12	–1.183	2nd	
2012–13	Pool B Group 1	3	2	1	0	0	4	+0.550	2nd	
