= Kanwal Naz =

Pakistani cricketer (born 1989)

Personal information
- Full name: Kanwal Naz
- Born: 25 December 1989 (age 36); Karachi, Pakistan
- Batting: Left-handed
- Bowling: Slow left-arm orthodox
- Role: Bowler

International information
- National side: Pakistan (2010)
- ODI debut (cap 56): 6 October 2010 v Ireland
- Last ODI: 9 October 2010 v Netherlands
- T20I debut (cap 20): 16 October 2010 v Netherlands
- Last T20I: 16 October 2010 v South Africa

Domestic team information
- Years: Team
- 2004/05–2009/10: Karachi
- 2010/11: Zarai Taraqiati Bank Limited
- 2012/13: Karachi

Career statistics
Competition	WODI	WT20I	WLA	WT20
Matches	3	2	33	18
Runs scored	17	–	203	14
Batting average	17.00	–	11.94	14.00
100s/50s	0/0	–	0/1	0/0
Top score	13*	–	54	9*
Balls bowled	120	42	1,337	365
Wickets	4	0	44	21
Bowling average	20.50	–	16.86	14.19
5 wickets in innings	0	0	0	0
10 wickets in match	0	0	0	0
Best bowling	3/18	–	4/18	3/9
Catches/stumpings	0/–	0/–	5/–	0/–
- Source: CricketArchive, 5 January 2021 2022

Kanwal Naz (born 25 December 1989) is a Pakistani former cricketer who played as a slow left-arm orthodox bowler. She appeared in three One Day Internationals and two Twenty20 Internationals for Pakistan in 2010. She played domestic cricket for Karachi and Zarai Taraqiati Bank Limited.

== Career ==
=== Domestic career ===
In the final of the 2005 National Women's Cricket Championship, Naz scored 54, helping her side Karachi to the title and received the Player of the Match award.

=== One Day International ===
Naz made her One Day International debut against Ireland women's cricket team on 6 October 2010.

=== Twenty20 International ===
Naz made her Twenty20 International debut against Ireland on 16 October 2010. Naz was selected in the Pakistan squad for the 2010 Asian Games in China, but didn't play a match.
