= Maryam Butt =

Pakistani cricketer (born 1985)

Personal information
- Full name: Maryam Butt
- Born: 26 April 1985 (age 41); Lahore, Pakistan
- Batting: Right-handed
- Bowling: Left-arm medium
- Role: Bowler

International information
- National side: Pakistan (2003–2006)
- Only Test (cap 17): 15 March 2004 v West Indies
- ODI debut (cap 32): 21 July 2003 v Japan
- Last ODI: 17 December 2006 v Sri Lanka

Domestic team information
- Years: Team
- 2005/06–2007/08: Lahore
- 2010/11: Pakistan Universities

Career statistics
Competition	WTest	WODI	WLA
Matches	1	12	32
Runs scored	27	56	196
Batting average	–	8.00	10.88
100s/50s	0/0	0/0	0/0
Top score	27*	19*	27*
Balls bowled	72	270	958
Wickets	1	4	19
Bowling average	19.00	41.25	31.21
5 wickets in innings	0	0	0
10 wickets in match	0	0	0
Best bowling	1/19	2/36	2/6
Catches/stumpings	1/–	1/–	7/–
- Source: CricketArchive, 21 December 2021

Maryam Butt (born 26 April 1985) is a Pakistani former cricketer who played primarily as a left-arm medium bowler. She appeared in one Test match and 12 One Day Internationals for Pakistan from July 2003 to December 2006. She played domestic cricket for Lahore and Pakistan Universities.
