= Quetta women's cricket team =

Pakistani women's cricket team

Quetta Women
Personnel
- Captain: Hina Siddiq

Team information
- Founded: Unknown First recorded match: 2005

History
- NWCC wins: 0

The Quetta women's cricket team is the women's representative cricket team for Quetta in domestic cricket in Pakistan. They competed in the National Women's Cricket Championship between 2004–05 and 2017.

== History ==
Quetta joined the National Women's Cricket Championship for its inaugural season in 2004–05, losing to Lahore in the initial knock-out stage. The side went on to compete in every edition of the National Women's Cricket Championship until it ended in 2017, but never made it out of the initial group stage. Their best finish came in the 2012–13 season, when they won two matches to finish second in Pool B Group 2.

== Players ==
=== Notable players ===
The players who played for Quetta and internationally for Pakistan are listed below, in order of first international appearance (given in brackets):

- (Pakistan) Nahida Khan (2009)

== Seasons ==
=== National Women's Cricket Championship ===
Season	Division	League standings								Notes
Season	Division	P	W	L	T	A/C	Pts	NRR	Pos	Notes
2004–05	N/A	Eliminated in knock-out round								
2005–06	Karachi Zone	2	0	2	0	0	0	–3.538	3rd	
2006–07	Group B	3	0	3	0	0	0	–3.082	4th	
2007–08	Group C	3	0	3	0	0	0	–3.436	4th	
2009–10	Zone B	4	1	3	0	0	4	–1.564	4th	
2010–11	Zone B	3	1	2	0	0	4	–1.742	3rd	
2011–12	Zone A	4	1	3	0	0	4	–1.119	4th	
2012–13	Pool B Group 2	3	2	1	0	0	4	+1.608	2nd	
2014	Qualifying Group I	2	0	2	0	0	0	–2.304	3rd	
2015	Qualifying Group II	2	0	2	0	0	0	–3.540	3rd	
2016	Qualifying Group I	2	0	2	0	0	0	–3.022	3rd	
2017	Pool B	3	0	3	0	0	0	–2.001	4th	

== See also ==
- Quetta cricket team
