= Tuba Hassan =

Pakistani cricketer

Personal information
- Full name: Tuba Hassan
- Born: 18 October 2000 (age 26); Lahore, Pakistan
- Batting: Left-handed
- Bowling: Right-arm leg break
- Role: Bowler

International information
- National side: Pakistan
- ODI debut (cap 88): 21 January 2023 v Australia
- Last ODI: 18 April 2024 v West Indies
- T20I debut (cap 50): 24 May 2022 v Sri Lanka
- Last T20I: 11 May 2024 v England
- T20I shirt no.: 72

Domestic team information
- Years: Team
- 2017: Lahore
- 2018/19: Higher Education Commission

Career statistics
Competition	WT20I
Matches	3
Runs scored	–
Batting average	–
100s/50s	–
Top score	–
Balls bowled	72
Wickets	5
Bowling average	8.80
5 wickets in innings	0
10 wickets in match	0
Best bowling	3/8
Catches/stumpings	1/–
- Source: CricketArchive, 21 February 2023

Tuba Hassan (born 18 October 2000) is a Pakistani cricketer who plays as a right-arm leg break bowler. She has also played domestic cricket for Lahore, Higher Education Commission and Quetta.

In January 2022, she was named as a reserve player in Pakistan's squad for the 2022 Women's Cricket World Cup. In May 2022, she was named in both the Women's Twenty20 International (WT20I) and Women's One Day International (WODI) squads for Sri Lanka's tour of Pakistan.

== International career ==
Hassan made her international debut in the first WT20I on 24 May 2022, in which she took the best bowling figures for a Pakistani debutant, with 3/8 from her four overs. Later the same month, she was named in Pakistan's team for the cricket tournament at the 2022 Commonwealth Games in Birmingham, England. Following her performance on her debut, she won the ICC Women's Player of the Month award ahead of teammate Bismah Maroof and Jersey player Trinity Smith, becoming the first women from the Pakistan team to win it. In July 2022, the Pakistan Cricket Board (PCB) awarded her with her first central contract.

Hassan made her ODI debut against Australia on 21 January 2023.

She was named in the Pakistan squad for the 2024 ICC Women's T20 World Cup.
