= Masooma Junaid =

Pakistani cricketer (born 1989)

Personal information
- Full name: Masooma Junaid Farooqi
- Born: 21 November 1989 (age 36); Karachi, Pakistan
- Batting: Left-handed
- Bowling: Left-arm medium
- Role: Bowler

International information
- National side: Pakistan (2011–2012)
- ODI debut (cap 60): 21 April 2011 v Sri Lanka
- Last ODI: 24 November 2011 v South Africa
- T20I debut (cap 23): 24 April 2011 v Ireland
- Last T20I: 29 August 2012 v Bangladesh

Domestic team information
- Years: Team
- 2006/07–2007/08: Karachi
- 2009/10: Pakistan Universities
- 2010/11: Zarai Taraqiati Bank Limited
- 2011/12: Karachi
- 2012/13: Sindh
- 2012/13: Zarai Taraqiati Bank Limited

Career statistics
Competition	WODI	WT20I	WLA	WT20
Matches	10	6	39	21
Runs scored	3	2	27	12
Batting average	1.50	–	2.70	12.00
100s/50s	0/0	0/0	0/0	0/0
Top score	2	2*	14*	8
Balls bowled	260	54	1,290	312
Wickets	7	0	31	8
Bowling average	19.85	–	23.32	37.25
5 wickets in innings	0	–	0	0
10 wickets in match	0	–	0	0
Best bowling	2/26	–	3/48	3/13
Catches/stumpings	1/–	1/–	6/–	1/–
Medal record
Representing Pakistan
Women's Cricket
Asian Games
Gold medal – first place	2010 Guangzhou	Team
- Source: CricketArchive, 6 January 2021

Masooma Junaid Farooqi (born 21 November 1989) is a Pakistani former cricketer who played as a left-arm medium bowler. She appeared in 10 One Day Internationals and six Twenty20 Internationals for Pakistan in 2011 and 2012. She played domestic cricket for Karachi, Pakistan Universities, Zarai Taraqiati Bank Limited and Sindh.

== Career ==
=== One Day International ===
Masooma made her One Day International debut against Sri Lanka in Colombo on 21 April 2011.

=== Twenty20 International ===
Masooma was selected to play in the 2010 Asian Games in China, where she was part of the Pakistan side that won the Asian women's cricket gold medal.
