= Uzma Gondal =

Pakistani cricketer (born 1978)

Personal information
- Full name: Uzma Naseer Gondal
- Born: 1 January 1978 (age 48)
- Batting: Right-handed
- Role: Wicket-keeper

International information
- National side: Pakistan (2000–2002)
- Only Test (cap 13): 30 July 2000 v Ireland
- ODI debut (cap 25): 23 July 2000 v Ireland
- Last ODI: 30 January 2002 v Sri Lanka

Domestic team information
- Years: Team
- 2005/06: Sialkot

Career statistics
Competition	WTest	WODI	WLA
Matches	1	17	20
Runs scored	0	18	32
Batting average	–	1.80	2.46
100s/50s	0/0	0/0	0/0
Top score	0*	6	12
Catches/stumpings	0/1	8/9	9/9
- Source: CricketArchive, 11 December 2021

Uzma Naseer Gondal (born 1 January 1978) is a Pakistani former cricketer who played as a wicket-keeper and right-handed batter. She appeared in one Test match and 17 One Day Internationals for Pakistan from July 2000 to January 2002. She played domestic cricket for Sialkot.
