= Rabiya Shah =

Pakistani cricketer (born 1992)

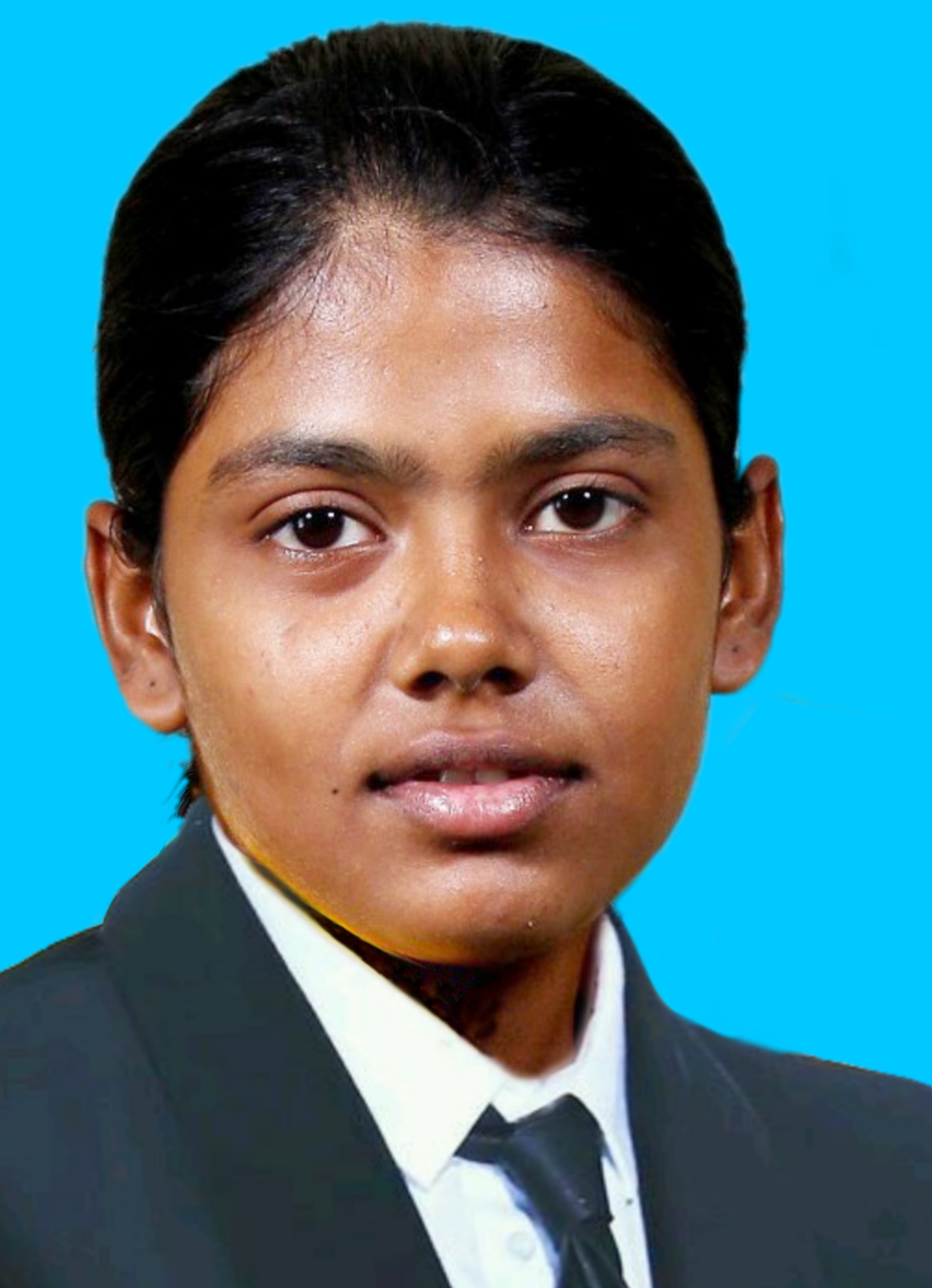

Personal information
- Full name: Rabiya Shah
- Born: 27 May 1992 (age 34); Karachi, Pakistan
- Batting: Left-handed
- Bowling: Right-arm off break
- Role: Wicket-keeper

International information
- National side: Pakistan (2010–2017)
- ODI debut (cap 62): 28 April 2011 v Netherlands
- Last ODI: 19 February 2017 v India
- T20I debut (cap 16): 10 May 2010 v New Zealand
- Last T20I: 1 November 2015 v West Indies

Domestic team information
- Years: Team
- 2006/07–2009/10: Karachi
- 2010/11–2017: Zarai Taraqiati Bank Limited
- 2014: Karachi

Career statistics
Competition	WODI	WT20I	WLA	WT20
Matches	25	15	77	41
Runs scored	127	6	967	205
Batting average	9.07	3.00	24.79	11.38
100s/50s	0/0	0/0	2/3	0/0
Top score	34	2	104	37
Balls bowled	–	–	6	–
Wickets	–	–	0	–
Bowling average	–	–	–	–
5 wickets in innings	–	–	0	–
10 wickets in match	–	–	0	–
Best bowling	–	–	–	–
Catches/stumpings	11/3	0/8	42/20	8/21
- Source: CricketArchive, 5 January 2022

Rabiya Shah (born 27 April 1992; Urdu: رابیعہ شاہ) is a Pakistani former cricketer who played as a wicket-keeper and left-handed batter. She appeared in 25 One Day Internationals and 15 Twenty20 Internationals for Pakistan between 2010 and 2017. She played domestic cricket for Karachi and Zarai Taraqiati Bank Limited.
