= Zehmarad Afzal =

Pakistani cricketer (born 1977)

Personal information
- Full name: Zehmarad Afzal
- Born: 24 October 1977 (age 49); Bahawalpur, Pakistan
- Batting: Right-handed
- Bowling: Right-arm medium-fast
- Role: All-rounder

International information
- National side: Pakistan (2000–2004)
- Only Test (cap 12): 30 July 2000 v Ireland
- ODI debut (cap 26): 23 July 2000 v Ireland
- Last ODI: 2 April 2004 v West Indies

Domestic team information
- Years: Team
- 2001–2002: Warwickshire
- 2004–2006: Cheshire
- 2006/07: Islamabad
- 2008–2010: Northamptonshire
- 2011–2012: Worcestershire
- 2016: Cheshire

Career statistics
| Competition | WTest | WODI | WLA | WT20 |
|---|---|---|---|---|
| Matches | 1 | 23 | 72 | 12 |
| Runs scored | 45 | 332 | 886 | 60 |
| Batting average | 22.50 | 14.43 | 14.52 | 7.50 |
| 100s/50s | 0/0 | 0/0 | 0/1 | 0/0 |
| Top score | 25 | 34 | 56* | 23 |
| Balls bowled | – | 174 | 1,450 | 66 |
| Wickets | – | 2 | 39 | 7 |
| Bowling average | – | 66.50 | 22.00 | 8.42 |
| 5 wickets in innings | – | 0 | 1 | 0 |
| 10 wickets in match | – | 0 | 0 | 0 |
| Best bowling | – | 1/22 | 5/23 | 4/13 |
| Catches/stumpings | 0/– | 2/– | 14/– | 2/– |
- Source: CricketArchive, 11 December 2021

Zehmarad Afzal (born 24 October 1977) is a Pakistani former cricketer who played as an all-rounder, batting right-handed and bowling right-arm medium-fast. She appeared in one Test match and 23 One Day Internationals for Pakistan between 2000 and 2004. She played domestic cricket for Islamabad in Pakistan, as well as Warwickshire, Cheshire, Northamptonshire and Worcestershire in England.
