= Shumaila Mushtaq =

Pakistani cricketer (born 1986)

Personal information
- Full name: Shumaila Mushtaq
- Born: 23 March 1986 (age 40); Lahore, Pakistan
- Batting: Right-handed
- Role: Batter

International information
- National side: Pakistan
- ODI debut (cap 43): 30 December 2005 v India
- Last ODI: 19 December 2006 v India

Domestic team information
- Years: Team
- 2004/05–2005/06: Lahore

Career statistics
Competition	WODI	WLA	WT20
Matches	3	20	6
Runs scored	9	424	79
Batting average	3.00	38.54	19.75
100s/50s	0/0	1/3	0/0
Top score	5	118*	36*
Balls bowled	–	25	–
Wickets	–	1	–
Bowling average	–	13.00	–
5 wickets in innings	–	0	–
10 wickets in match	–	0	–
Best bowling	–	1/9	–
Catches/stumpings	1/–	5/–	1/–
- Source: CricketArchive, 7 January 2022

Shumaila Mushtaq (born 23 March 1986) is a Pakistani former cricketer who played as a right-handed batter. In March 2005, she was one of 33 players selected for a training camp by Pakistan's selection committee. She made her Women's One Day International (WODI) debut for Pakistan against India on 20 December 2005, and went on to play three WODIs for the side, the last of them on 19 December 2006, also against India. In April 2008, she was named in Pakistan's squad for the 2008 Women's Asia Cup, but did not play. She played domestic cricket for Lahore.
