= Shumaila Qureshi =

Pakistani cricketer (born 1988)

Personal information
- Full name: Shumaila Qureshi
- Born: 30 April 1988 (age 38); Karachi, Pakistan
- Nickname: shumi..
- Batting: Right-handed
- Bowling: Right-arm off break
- Role: Bowler

International information
- National side: Pakistan (2010)
- ODI debut (cap 58): 9 October 2010 v Netherlands
- Last ODI: 12 October 2010 v West Indies
- Only T20I (cap 19): 14 October 2010 v Sri Lanka

Domestic team information
- Years: Team
- 2006/07–2014: Karachi
- 2011/12: Sindh
- 2012/13: Balochistan
- 2014–2015: Omar Associates

Career statistics
| Competition | WODI | WT20I | WLA | WT20 |
|---|---|---|---|---|
| Matches | 3 | 1 | 41 | 13 |
| Runs scored | 15 | 0 | 110 | 36 |
| Batting average | 7.50 | 0.00 | 6.87 | 9.00 |
| 100s/50s | 0/0 | 0/0 | 0/0 | 0/0 |
| Top score | 15* | 0 | 25* | 13* |
| Balls bowled | 138 | 24 | 1,763 | 289 |
| Wickets | 4 | 1 | 51 | 14 |
| Bowling average | 27.75 | 20.00 | 16.74 | 19.28 |
| 5 wickets in innings | 0 | 0 | 1 | 0 |
| 10 wickets in match | 0 | 0 | 0 | 0 |
| Best bowling | 2/33 | 1/20 | 5/19 | 3/14 |
| Catches/stumpings | 0/– | 0/– | 5/– | 1/– |
- Source: CricketArchive, 2 January 2022

Shumaila Qureshi (born 30 April 1988) is a Pakistani former cricketer who played as a right-arm off break bowler. She appeared in three One Day Internationals and one Twenty20 Internationals for Pakistan in 2010. She played domestic cricket for Karachi, Sindh, Balochistan, Omar Associates.

She is currently a trainer for cricket and Physical Training teacher at Alpha Core School PECHS Branch, Karachi.
