= Bahawalpur women's cricket team =

Pakistani women's cricket team

Bahawalpur Women
Personnel
- Captain: Saba Khurshid

Team information
- Founded: Unknown First recorded match: 2013

History
- NWCC wins: 0

The Bahawalpur women's cricket team is the women's representative cricket team for Bahawalpur, in domestic cricket in Pakistan. They competed in the National Women's Cricket Championship between 2012–13 and 2017.

== History ==
Bahawalpur joined the National Women's Cricket Championship in 2012–13, finishing bottom of Pool B Group 1. The side went on to compete in every subsequent edition of the National Women's Cricket Championship until it ended in 2017, with their best performance coming in 2016, when they qualified for the Super League round of the competition after finishing second in Pool B.

== Seasons ==
=== National Women's Cricket Championship ===
Season	Division	League standings								Notes
Season	Division	P	W	L	T	A/C	Pts	NRR	Pos	Notes
2012–13	Pool B Group 1	3	0	2	0	1	1	–2.833	4th	
2014	Qualifying Group II	2	0	2	0	0	0	–2.240	3rd	
2015	Qualifying Group II	2	1	1	0	0	2	+0.423	2nd	
2016	Super League	5	0	5	0	0	0	–5.300	6th	
2017	Pool A	3	1	2	0	0	2	–2.673	3rd	

== Honours ==
- National Women's Cricket Championship:
  - Winners (0):
  - Best finish: 6th (2016)

== See also ==
- Bahawalpur cricket team
