= Pakistan Universities women's cricket team =

Pakistani women's cricket team

Pakistan Universities Women
Personnel
- Captain: Zaiba Manzoor

Team information
- Founded: Unknown First recorded match: 2007

History
- NWCC wins: 0

The Pakistan Universities women's cricket team is a Pakistani women's cricket team. They competed in the National Women's Cricket Championship, a one-day cricket tournament, between 2006–07 and 2010–11.

== History ==
Pakistan Universities competed in the National Women's Cricket Championship between 2006–07 and 2010–11. In their final three seasons, they topped their initial group to qualify for the Final Stage group, but each time finished third out of the three qualifying teams.

== Players ==
=== Notable players ===
Players who played for Pakistan Universities and played internationally are listed below, in order of first international appearance (given in brackets):

- (Pakistan) Maryam Butt (2003)
- (Pakistan) Bismah Maroof (2006)
- (United States) Sara Farooq (2009)
- (Pakistan) Nida Dar (2010)
- (Pakistan) Masooma Junaid (2011)

== Seasons ==
=== National Women's Cricket Championship ===
Season	Division	League standings								Notes
Season	Division	P	W	L	T	A/C	Pts	NRR	Pos	Notes
2006–07	Group C	3	1	2	0	0	4	+0.123	3rd	
2007–08	Group B	3	2	1	0	0	8	+1.095	1st	3rd in Final Stage
2009–10	Zone C	3	3	0	0	0	12	+3.080	1st	3rd in Final Stage
2010–11	Zone B	3	3	0	0	0	12	+2.522	1st	3rd in Final Stage

== Honours ==
- National Women's Cricket Championship:
  - Winners (0):
  - Best finish: 3rd (2007–08, 2009–10 & 2010–11)

== See also ==
- Pakistan Universities cricket team
