= Faisalabad women's cricket team =

Pakistani women's cricket team

Faisalabad Women
Personnel
- Captain: Uzma Younis

Team information
- Founded: Unknown First recorded match: 2005

The Faisalabad women's cricket team is the women's representative cricket team for Faisalabad in domestic cricket in Pakistan. They competed in the National Women's Cricket Championship between 2004–05 and 2017.

== History ==
Faisalabad joined the National Women's Cricket Championship for its inaugural season in 2004–05, being eliminated in the initial knock-out round to Multan. The side went on to compete in every edition of the National Women's Cricket Championship until it ended in 2017, but never made it out of the group stages. Their best finish came in 2017, when they topped Group C and then finished 3rd in the Super League round of the competition.

== Players ==
=== Notable players ===
The players who played for Faisalabad and for Pakistan internationally are listed below, in order of first international appearance (given in brackets):

- (Pakistan) Sadia Yousuf (2008)
- (Pakistan) Sadia Iqbal (2019)
- (Pakistan) Umm-e-Hani (2022)
- (Pakistan) Waheeda Akhtar (2023)

== Seasons ==
=== National Women's Cricket Championship ===
Season	Division	League standings								Notes
Season	Division	P	W	L	T	A/C	Pts	NRR	Pos	Notes
2004–05	N/A	Eliminated in knock-out round								
2005–06	Lahore Zone	3	2	1	0	0	8	–0.313	2nd	
2006–07	Group A	3	1	2	0	0	4	–1.251	4th	
2007–08	Group A	3	1	2	0	0	4	–0.188	3rd	
2009–10	Zone A	4	1	3	0	0	4	–1.220	4th	
2010–11	Zone A	4	3	0	0	1	14	+1.217	2nd	
2011–12	Zone C	3	1	2	0	0	4	–0.170	3rd	
2012–13	Pool A	6	0	6	0	0	0	–2.708	7th	
2014	Qualifying Group I	2	1	1	0	0	2	+1.004	2nd	
2015	Pool A	3	0	3	0	0	0	–3.997	4th	
2016	Qualifying Group I	2	1	0	0	1	3	+2.298	2nd	
2017	Super League	4	1	1	0	2	4	–0.278	3rd	

== Honours ==
- National Women's Cricket Championship:
  - Winners (0):
  - Best finish: 3rd (2017)

== See also ==
- Faisalabad cricket team
