= Hyderabad women's cricket team (Pakistan) =

Pakistani women's cricket team

Hyderabad Women
Personnel
- Captain: Sajjida Shah

Team information
- Founded: Unknown First recorded match: 2005

History
- NWCC wins: 0

The Hyderabad women's cricket team is the women's representative cricket team for Hyderabad, in Pakistan's Sindh province. They competed in the National Women's Cricket Championship between 2004–05 and 2017.

== History ==
Hyderabad joined the National Women's Cricket Championship for its inaugural season in 2004–05, defeating Peshawar in the initial knock-out stage before finishing third in the final Super League. The side went on to compete in every edition of the National Women's Cricket Championship until it ended in 2017, but did not better their best finish from their first season. They finished second in their group in 2005–06, 2006–07 and 2014.

== Players ==
=== Notable players ===
The players who have played for Hyderabad and for Pakistan internationally are listed below, in order of first international appearance (given in brackets):

- (Pakistan) Sajjida Shah (2000)
- (Pakistan) Sumaiya Siddiqi (2007)
- (Pakistan) Natalia Pervaiz (2017)

== Seasons ==
=== National Women's Cricket Championship ===
Season	Division	League standings								Notes
Season	Division	P	W	L	T	A/C	Pts	NRR	Pos	Notes
2004–05	Super League	3	1	2	0	0	4	–2.680	3rd	
2005–06	Karachi Zone	2	1	1	0	0	4	–0.925	2nd	
2006–07	Group B	3	2	1	0	0	8	+0.237	2nd	
2007–08	Group C	3	1	2	0	0	4	–1.656	3rd	
2009–10	Zone B	4	2	2	0	0	8	–0.846	3rd	
2010–11	Zone A	4	0	4	0	0	0	–2.101	5th	
2011–12	Zone C	3	0	3	0	0	0	–4.216	4th	
2012–13	Pool B Group 2	3	1	2	0	0	2	–1.032	3rd	
2014	Pool A	3	2	1	0	0	4	–0.419	2nd	
2015	Pool C	3	0	3	0	0	0	–5.555	4th	
2016	Qualifying Group II	2	1	0	0	1	3	+2.784	2nd	
2017	Pool C	3	0	3	0	0	0	–1.740	4th	

== Honours ==
- National Women's Cricket Championship:
  - Winners (0):
  - Best finish: 3rd (2004–05)

== See also ==
- Hyderabad cricket team (Pakistan)
