= Sialkot women's cricket team =

Pakistani women's cricket team

Sialkot Women
Personnel
- Captain: Zaiba Manzoor

Team information
- Founded: Unknown First recorded match: 2006

History
- NWCC wins: 0

The Sialkot women's cricket team is the women's representative cricket team for Sialkot in domestic cricket in Pakistan. They competed in the National Women's Cricket Championship between 2005–06 and 2017.

== History ==
Sialkot joined the National Women's Cricket Championship for its second season in 2005–06, losing all three of their matches in the Lahore Zone. The side competed in every subsequent edition of the National Women's Cricket Championship until it ended in 2017. They qualified for the final of Pool B in 2012–13, but lost to Islamabad. In 2016, they qualified for the final Super League stage, finishing 5th overall.

== Players ==
=== Notable players ===
The players who played for Sialkot and for Pakistan internationally are listed below, in order of first international appearance (given in brackets):

- (Pakistan) Nazia Nazir (1997)
- (Pakistan) Sadia Butt (1997)
- (Pakistan) Uzma Gondal (2000)
- (Pakistan) Almas Akram (2008)
- (Pakistan) Nida Dar (2010)
- (Pakistan) Saba Nazir (2019)

== Seasons ==
=== National Women's Cricket Championship ===
Season	Division	League standings								Notes
Season	Division	P	W	L	T	A/C	Pts	NRR	Pos	Notes
2005–06	Lahore Zone	3	0	3	0	0	0	–2.621	4th	
2006–07	Group A	3	1	2	0	0	4	–0.441	3rd	
2007–08	Group B	3	2	1	0	0	8	–0.149	2nd	
2009–10	Zone C	3	1	2	0	0	4	–1.562	3rd	
2010–11	Zone C	3	0	2	0	1	2	–1.515	4th	
2011–12	Zone B	4	0	4	0	0	0	–2.130	5th	
2012–13	Pool B Group 2	3	3	0	0	0	6	+2.104	1st	Lost Pool B Final
2014	Pool A	3	1	2	0	0	2	–0.406	3rd	
2015	Pool C	3	1	2	0	0	2	–1.740	3rd	
2016	Super League	5	1	4	0	0	2	–3.520	5th	
2017	Pool B	3	2	1	0	0	4	–0.235	2nd	

== Honours ==
- National Women's Cricket Championship:
  - Winners (0):
  - Best finish: 5th (2016)

== See also ==
- Sialkot cricket team
