= Qanita Jalil =

Pakistani cricketer (born 1978)

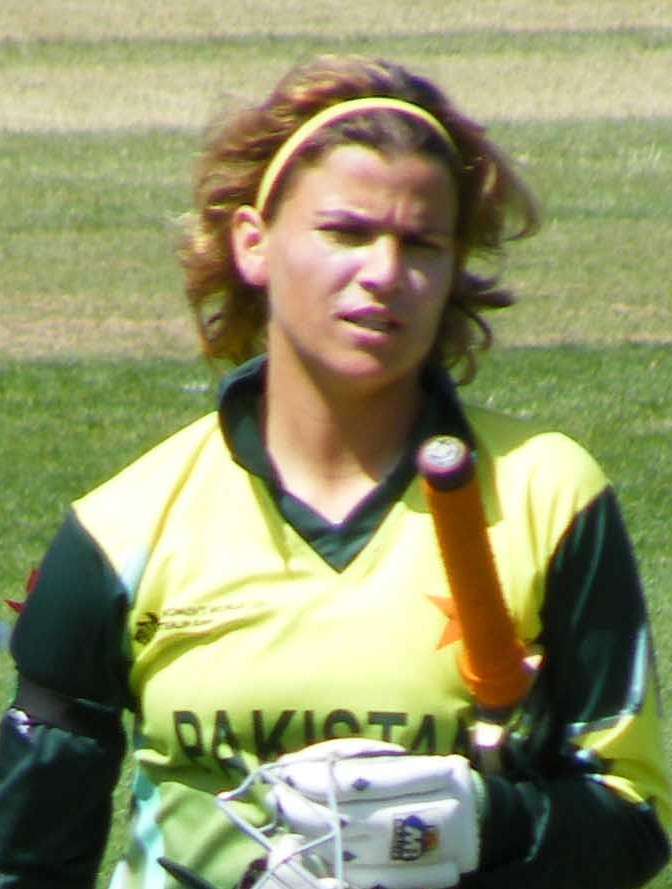
- Qanita Jalil in 2009

Personal information
- Full name: Qanita Jalil
- Born: 21 March 1978 (age 48); Abbottabad, Pakistan
- Batting: Right-handed
- Bowling: Right-arm fast-medium
- Role: All-rounder
- Relatives: Nasir Jalil (brother)

International information
- National side: Pakistan (2005–2015)
- ODI debut (cap 38): 28 December 2005 v Sri Lanka
- Last ODI: 11 January 2015 v Sri Lanka
- T20I debut (cap 8): 25 May 2009 v Ireland
- Last T20I: 17 January 2015 v Sri Lanka

Domestic team information
- Years: Team
- 2005/06: Peshawar
- 2006/07–2007/08: Abbottabad
- 2009/10–2015/16: Zarai Taraqiati Bank Limited
- 2014: Abbottabad

Career statistics
Competition	WODI	WT20I	WLA	WT20
Matches	66	51	112	87
Runs scored	445	223	1,219	559
Batting average	8.90	6.37	17.66	9.47
100s/50s	0/1	0/0	2/4	0/1
Top score	53	21	116	50
Balls bowled	2,208	705	3,865	1,341
Wickets	50	22	109	42
Bowling average	29.24	29.59	20.89	27.97
5 wickets in innings	1	0	1	0
10 wickets in match	0	0	0	0
Best bowling	5/62	2/9	5/62	2/9
Catches/stumpings	8/–	8/–	27/–	9/–
Medal record
Representing Pakistan
Women's Cricket
Asian Games
Gold medal – first place	2014 Incheon	Team
- Source: CricketArchive, 1 January 2022

Qanita Jalil (born 21 March 1978) is a Pakistani former cricketer who played as a right-arm fast-medium bowler and right-handed batter. She appeared in 66 One Day Internationals and 51 Twenty20 Internationals for Pakistan between 2005 and 2015. She played domestic cricket for Peshawar, Abbottabad and Zarai Taraqiati Bank Limited.

She was a member of the gold-medal-winning Pakistan team at the 2014 Asian Games.

She is the sister of Pakistani First class cricketer Nasir Jalil.
