= Karachi women's cricket team =

Pakistani women's cricket team

Karachi Women
Personnel
- Captain: Rida Hussain

Team information
- Founded: Unknown First recorded match: 2005

History
- NWCC wins: 4

The Karachi women's cricket team is the women's representative cricket team for Karachi, Pakistan. They competed in the National Women's Cricket Championship between 2004–05 and 2017, winning the competition four times.

== History ==
Karachi joined the National Women's Cricket Championship for its inaugural season in 2004–05 and won the tournament. They competed in every edition of the championship until 2017, when the tournament was replaced by the PCB Triangular One Day Women's Tournament. The side won the competition four times: firstly, in its inaugural season, Karachi topped the initial group stage and the subsequent Final Stage, before beating Lahore in the final to win the tournament. After losing the 2005–06 final to Lahore, they then won the tournament two seasons in a row, in 2006–07 and 2007–08, both times beating Lahore in the final.

Karachi lost in the final of the competition again in 2009–10 and 2014, before finally winning their fourth title in the final season of the National Women's Cricket Championship, 2017, topping the Super League section of the tournament with three wins and one abandonment from their four matches.

== Players ==
=== Notable players ===
Players who played for Karachi and played internationally are listed below, in order of first international appearance (given in brackets):

- (Pakistan) Kiran Baluch (1997)
- (Pakistan) Shaiza Khan (1997)
- (Pakistan) Khursheed Jabeen (2000)
- (Pakistan) Batool Fatima (2001)
- (Pakistan) Urooj Mumtaz (2004)
- (Pakistan) Armaan Khan (2005)
- (Pakistan) Sana Mir (2005)
- (Pakistan) Humera Masroor (2006)
- (Pakistan) Nain Abidi (2006)
- (Pakistan) Javeria Khan (2008)
- (Pakistan) Sania Khan (2009)
- (Pakistan) Rabiya Shah (2010)
- (Pakistan) Kanwal Naz (2010)
- (Pakistan) Shumaila Qureshi (2010)
- (Pakistan) Kainat Imtiaz (2010)
- (Pakistan) Masooma Junaid (2011)
- (Pakistan) Javeria Rauf (2012)
- (Pakistan) Maham Tariq (2014)
- (Pakistan) Ayesha Zafar (2015)
- (Pakistan) Muneeba Ali (2016)
- (Pakistan) Aiman Anwer (2016)
- (Pakistan) Omaima Sohail (2018)
- (Pakistan) Fatima Sana (2019)
- (Pakistan) Rameen Shamim (2019)
- (Pakistan) Syeda Aroob Shah (2019)

== Seasons ==
=== National Women's Cricket Championship ===
Season	Division	League standings								Notes
Season	Division	P	W	L	T	A/C	Pts	NRR	Pos	Notes
2004–05	Super League	3	2	1	0	0	8	+1.916	2nd	Champions
2005–06	Karachi Zone	2	2	0	0	0	8	+4.462	1st	Lost final
2006–07	Group B	3	3	0	0	0	12	+5.157	1st	Champions
2007–08	Group C	3	3	0	0	0	12	+3.158	1st	Champions
2009–10	Zone B	4	4	0	0	0	16	+3.010	1st	Lost final
2010–11	Zone B	3	2	1	0	0	8	+1.340	2nd	
2011–12	Zone C	3	2	1	0	0	8	+1.382	2nd	
2012–13	Pool A	6	4	2	0	0	8	+0.388	3rd	
2014	Pool A	3	3	0	0	0	6	+3.740	1st	Lost final
2015	Pool B	3	1	2	0	0	2	–2.244	3rd	
2016	Pool B	3	0	2	0	1	1	–3.824	4th	
2017	Super League	4	3	0	0	1	7	+2.053	1st	Champions

== Honours ==
- National Women's Cricket Championship:
  - Winners (4): 2004–05, 2006–07, 2007–08 & 2017

== See also ==
- List of Karachi first-class cricket teams
