= Almas Akram =

Pakistani cricketer (born 1988)

Personal information
- Full name: Almas Akram
- Born: 15 April 1988 (age 38); Nankana Sahib, Pakistan
- Batting: Left-handed
- Bowling: Left-arm medium-fast
- Role: All-rounder

International information
- National side: Pakistan (2008–2009)
- ODI debut (cap 49): 2 May 2008 v Sri Lanka
- Last ODI: 26 May 2009 v Ireland
- T20I debut (cap 1): 25 May 2009 v Ireland
- Last T20I: 16 June 2009 v England

Domestic team information
- Years: Team
- 2006/07–2007/08: Sialkot
- 2009/10: Zarai Taraqiati Bank Limited
- 2010/11: Sialkot
- 2011/12: Baluchistan
- 2011/12: Zarai Taraqiati Bank Limited
- 2012/13–2014: Sialkot
- 2014–2018/19: Zarai Taraqiati Bank Limited

Career statistics
Competition	WODI	WT20I	WLA	WT20
Matches	12	4	55	52
Runs scored	54	16	351	210
Batting average	6.00	5.33	13.50	13.12
100s/50s	0/0	0/0	0/1	0/0
Top score	19	12	79*	33
Balls bowled	318	30	1,939	853
Wickets	9	1	59	46
Bowling average	23.55	46.00	17.64	14.93
5 wickets in innings	0	0	1	0
10 wickets in match	0	0	0	0
Best bowling	3/7	1/11	7/24	3/10
Catches/stumpings	2/–	0/–	14/–	11/–
- Source: CricketArchive, 2 January 2022

Almas Akram (Urdu: الماس اکرم) (born 15 April 1988) is a Pakistani former cricketer who played as a left-arm medium-fast bowler and left-handed batter. She appeared in 12 One Day Internationals and four Twenty20 Internationals for Pakistan in 2008 and 2009. She played domestic cricket for Sialkot, Zarai Taraqiati Bank Limited (ZTBL) and Balochistan.

In 2018, she helped ZTBL win the inaugural Departmental Women’s T20 Cricket Championship, claiming 2 wickets for 25 runs in her four overs in the final.
