= Kaynat Hafeez =

Pakistani cricketer (born 1996)

Personal information
- Full name: Kaynat Hafeez
- Born: 17 June 1996 (age 30); Lahore, Pakistan
- Batting: Right-handed
- Bowling: Right-arm off break
- Role: All-rounder

International information
- National side: Pakistan
- Only ODI (cap 84): 14 December 2019 v England

Domestic team information
- Years: Team
- 2014: Lahore
- 2015–2015/16: Higher Education Commission
- 2016: Lahore
- 2016/17–2018: State Bank of Pakistan

Career statistics
| Competition | WODI | WLA | WT20 |
|---|---|---|---|
| Matches | 1 | 44 | 25 |
| Runs scored | 4 | 516 | 396 |
| Batting average | 4.00 | 15.17 | 23.29 |
| 100s/50s | 0/0 | 0/2 | 0/1 |
| Top score | 4 | 82 | 74 |
| Balls bowled | – | 442 | 24 |
| Wickets | – | 20 | 2 |
| Bowling average | – | 12.05 | 7.50 |
| 5 wickets in innings | – | 0 | 0 |
| 10 wickets in match | – | 0 | 0 |
| Best bowling | – | 3/19 | 2/15 |
| Catches/stumpings | 0/– | 8/– | 4/– |
- Source: CricketArchive, 4 January 2022

Kaynat Hafeez (born 17 June 1996) is a Pakistani cricket all-rounder, who plays as a right-handed batter and right-arm off break bowler. In November 2019, she was named in Pakistan's squads for their series against England in Malaysia. She made her Women's One Day International (WODI) for Pakistan, against England, on 14 December 2019.

In June 2021, she was named in Pakistan's squad for their series against the West Indies.

She has played domestic cricket for Lahore, the Higher Education Commission and the State Bank of Pakistan.
