= Islamabad women's cricket team =

Pakistani women's cricket team

Islamabad Women
Personnel
- Captain: Hina Shafiq

Team information
- Founded: Unknown First recorded match: 2006

History
- NWCC wins: 0

The Islamabad women's cricket team is the women's representative cricket team for Islamabad, the federal capital of Pakistan, in domestic cricket competitions in the country. They competed in the National Women's Cricket Championship between 2005–06 and 2017.

== History ==
Islamabad joined the National Women's Cricket Championship for its second season in 2005–06, winning one of their two matches in the Rawalpindi Zone. The following season, 2006–07, the side qualified for the final stage of the competition after they won Group C, but lost both of their matches to finish third overall.

The side competed in every subsequent edition of the National Women's Cricket Championship until it ended in 2017, with high points including winning Pool B in 2012–13, beating Sialkot in the final, and qualifying for the final Super League stage in 2016, finishing 4th overall.

== Players ==
=== Notable players ===
The players who played for Islamabad and for Pakistan internationally are listed below, in order of first international appearance (given in brackets):

- (Pakistan) Zehmarad Afzal (2000)
- (Pakistan) Naila Nazir (2009)
- (Pakistan) Diana Baig (2015)

== Seasons ==
=== National Women's Cricket Championship ===
Season	Division	League standings								Notes
Season	Division	P	W	L	T	A/C	Pts	NRR	Pos	Notes
2005–06	Rawalpindi Zone	2	1	1	0	0	4	+1.143	2nd	
2006–07	Group C	3	2	0	0	1	10	+2.747	1st	3rd in Final Stage
2007–08	Group B	3	1	2	0	0	4	–0.390	3rd	
2009–10	Zone A	4	3	1	0	0	12	+0.461	2nd	
2010–11	Zone A	4	1	2	0	1	6	+0.034	3rd	
2011–12	Zone A	4	2	1	1	0	10	+0.889	3rd	
2012–13	Pool B Group 1	3	2	0	0	1	5	+1.780	1st	Won Pool B Final
2014	Pool B	3	1	2	0	0	2	–0.362	3rd	
2015	Pool A	3	1	2	0	0	2	–2.090	3rd	
2016	Super League	5	2	3	0	0	4	–2.551	4th	
2017	Pool C	3	2	1	0	0	4	+0.607	2nd	

== Honours ==
- National Women's Cricket Championship:
  - Winners (0):
  - Best finish: 3rd (2006–07)

== See also ==
- Federal Capital women's cricket team
- Islamabad cricket team
