= National Women's Cricket Championship =

Pakistan women's one-day cricket competition

- Countries: Pakistan
- Administrator: Pakistan Cricket Board (PCB)
- Format: Limited overs cricket (50 overs per side)
- First edition: 2004–05
- Latest edition: 2017
- Tournament format: Round-robin and final
- Number of teams: 18
- Current champion: Karachi (Super League); Zarai Taraqiati Bank Limited (Departmental)
- Most successful: Zarai Taraqiati Bank Limited (7 titles)

The National Women's Cricket Championship, officially the Mohtarma Fatima Jinnah National Women's Cricket Championship, was a women's domestic one-day cricket competition that took place in Pakistan between 2004–05 and 2017. The tournament included both regional and departmental teams, and took place alongside the Women's Cricket Challenge Trophy.

Zarai Taraqiati Bank Limited were the most successful side in the history of the competition, with 7 titles. Karachi and Lahore are the only other sides to have won the competition, with 4 and 2 titles, respectively.

== History ==
The National Women's Cricket Championship began in the 2004–05 season, with eight regional teams competing in Lahore across a week in March 2005. The tournament followed the creation of a women's wing of the Pakistan Cricket Board a year previously, and was hoped to spark greater interest in cricket amongst women. The competition was won by Karachi, who beat Lahore in the final by 6 wickets.

The tournament soon expanded, with Sialkot joining the following season and Abbottabad and Pakistan Universities the season after that. Karachi and Lahore dominated the first four seasons of the competition, reaching the final every time, with Karachi winning three tournaments and Lahore one.

From the 2009–10 season, a new team, Zarai Taraqiati Bank Limited, dominated the tournament, winning seven titles, one in every season they competed. In 2014, the only season in this period when Zarai did not compete, Lahore claimed their second title, beating Karachi in the final. That year, the tournament was also renamed the Mohtarma Fatima Jinnah National Women's Cricket Championship, after the Pakistani stateswoman.

In the final season of the tournament, 2017, the teams were split into two sections, one for regional teams and one for departmental teams, meaning there were two winners: Karachi won the Super League to win the regional section, whilst Zarai Taraqiati Bank Limited beat the Higher Education Commission in the final of the departmental round. In 2017–18, the tournament was replaced by the PCB Triangular One Day Women's Tournament, with composite rather than geographical or departmental teams.

Matches in the tournament were predominantly played using a limited overs format with 50 overs per side, apart from in the first two seasons, where matches could also be either 30, 35 or 40 overs per side. The tournament had various formats over the years, but generally involved teams divided into an initial group stage, with the top performing teams progressing to a secondary group stage before the winners of these groups progressed to the final.

== Teams ==
Team	04/05	05/06	06/07	07/08	09/10	10/11	11/12	12/13	2014	2015	2016	2017	Total	Titles
Abbottabad													10	0
Bahawalpur													5	0
Faisalabad													12	0
Higher Education Commission													5	0
Hyderabad													12	0
Islamabad													11	0
Karachi													12	4
Lahore													12	2
Multan													12	0
Omar Associates													2	0
PCB Blues													1	0
PCB Greens													1	0
PCB XI													1	0
Pakistan Education Board													3	0
Pakistan Universities													4	0
Peshawar													12	0
Quetta													12	0
Rawalpindi													12	0
Saif Sports Saga													2	0
Sialkot													11	0
State Bank of Pakistan													2	0
Zarai Taraqiati Bank Limited													7	7

Key

- Champions
- Runners-up
- Competed
- Did not compete

== Results ==
Season	Winners	Runners-up	Match format	Ref
2004–05	Karachi	Lahore	30–40 overs	
2005–06	Lahore	Karachi	40–50 overs	
2006–07	Karachi	Lahore	50 overs	
2007–08	Karachi	Lahore	50 overs	
2009–10	Zarai Taraqiati Bank Limited	Karachi	50 overs	
2010–11	Zarai Taraqiati Bank Limited	Lahore	50 overs	
2011–12	Zarai Taraqiati Bank Limited	Higher Education Commission	50 overs	
2012–13	Zarai Taraqiati Bank Limited	Higher Education Commission	50 overs	
2014	Lahore	Karachi	50 overs	
2015	Zarai Taraqiati Bank Limited	Higher Education Commission	50 overs	
2016	Zarai Taraqiati Bank Limited	State Bank of Pakistan	50 overs	
2017	Karachi (Super League)	Lahore (Super League)	50 overs	
2017	Zarai Taraqiati Bank Limited (Departmental)	Higher Education Commission (Departmental)	50 overs	

== See also ==
- Pakistan Women's One Day Cup
