= Abbottabad women's cricket team =

Pakistani women's cricket team

Abbottabad Women
Personnel
- Captain: Sadia Bibi

Team information
- Founded: Unknown First recorded match: 2007

History
- NWCC wins: 0

The Abbottabad women's cricket team is the women's representative cricket team for Abbottabad, in Khyber Pakhtunkhwa province of Pakistan. They competed in the National Women's Cricket Championship between 2006–07 and 2017.

== History ==
Abbottabad joined the National Women's Cricket Championship in its third season in 2006–07, losing both of their matches in Group C. The side went on to compete in every subsequent edition of the National Women's Cricket Championship until the tournament ended in 2017, but never made it out of the group stages. Their most successful season came in 2007–08, when they won two of their three matches.

== Players ==
=== Notable players ===
The players who played for Abbottabad and for Pakistan internationally are listed below, in order of first international appearance (given in brackets):

- (Pakistan) Qanita Jalil (2005)
- (Pakistan) Nashra Sandhu (2017)
- (Pakistan) Ayesha Naseem (2020)

== Seasons ==
=== National Women's Cricket Championship ===
Season	Division	League standings								Notes
Season	Division	P	W	L	T	A/C	Pts	NRR	Pos	Notes
2006–07	Group C	3	0	2	0	1	2	–2.148	3rd	
2007–08	Group A	3	2	1	0	0	8	+1.260	2nd	
2009–10	Zone A	4	0	4	0	0	0	–4.917	5th	
2010–11	Zone B	3	0	3	0	0	0	–3.296	4th	
2011–12	Zone A	4	0	4	0	0	0	–2.927	5th	
2012–13	Pool B Group 2	3	0	3	0	0	0	–2.380	4th	
2014	Pool B	3	0	3	0	0	0	–4.441	4th	
2015	Qualifying Group II	2	0	2	0	0	0	–2.099	3rd	
2016	Qualifying Group II	2	0	2	0	0	0	–3.078	3rd	
2017	Pool B	3	1	2	0	0	2	–1.572	3rd	

== See also ==
- Abbottabad cricket team
