= Lahore women's cricket team =

Pakistani women's cricket team

Lahore Women
Personnel
- Captain: Hina Azam

Team information
- Founded: Unknown First recorded match: 2005

History
- NWCC wins: 2

The Lahore women's cricket team is the women's representative cricket team for Lahore in domestic cricket in Pakistan. They competed in the National Women's Cricket Championship between 2004–05 and 2017, winning the tournament twice.

== History ==
Lahore joined the National Women's Cricket Championship for its inaugural season in 2004–05, and competed in every subsequent edition until the tournament ended in 2017. The side reached the final of the competition in its inaugural season, but lost to Karachi. The following season, however, they won the competition for the first time, beating Karachi in the final by 40 runs. They then became finalists in three of the next four seasons, twice against Karachi and once against Zarai Taraqiati Bank Limited.

Lahore won the National Women's Cricket Championship for the second time in 2014, beating Karachi by 18 runs, helped by 84* from captain Bismah Maroof. In the final season of the competition, 2017, Lahore finished as runners-up in the Super League section of the tournament.

== Players ==
=== Notable players ===
The players who played for Lahore and for Pakistan internationally are listed below, in order of first international appearance (given in brackets):

- (Pakistan) Sharmeen Khan (1997)
- (Pakistan) Nazia Sadiq (1997)
- (Pakistan) Maryam Butt (2003)
- (Pakistan) Sabahat Rasheed (2005)
- (Pakistan) Sana Javed (2005)
- (Pakistan) Tasqeen Qadeer (2005)
- (Pakistan) Shumaila Mushtaq (2005)
- (Pakistan) Bismah Maroof (2006)
- (Pakistan) Marina Iqbal (2009)
- (Pakistan) Sidra Ameen (2011)
- (Pakistan) Elizebath Khan (2012)
- (Pakistan) Iram Javed (2013)
- (Pakistan) Anam Amin (2014)
- (Pakistan) Sidra Nawaz (2014)
- (Pakistan) Aliya Riaz (2014)
- (Pakistan) Fareeha Mehmood (2018)
- (Pakistan) Kaynat Hafeez (2019)
- (Pakistan) Tuba Hassan (2022)
- (Pakistan) Sadaf Shamas (2022)
- (Pakistan) Waheeda Akhtar (2023)

== Seasons ==
=== National Women's Cricket Championship ===
Season	Division	League standings								Notes
Season	Division	P	W	L	T	A/C	Pts	NRR	Pos	Notes
2004–05	Super League	3	3	0	0	0	12	+2.784	1st	Lost final
2005–06	Lahore Zone	3	3	0	0	0	12	+4.021	1st	Champions
2006–07	Group A	3	3	0	0	0	12	+1.547	1st	Lost final
2007–08	Group C	3	3	0	0	0	12	+2.399	1st	Lost final
2009–10	Zone C	3	2	1	0	0	8	+2.521	2nd	
2010–11	Zone B	4	3	0	0	1	14	+2.167	1st	Lost final
2011–12	Zone A	4	4	0	0	0	16	+1.651	1st	3rd in Final Stage
2012–13	Pool A	6	4	2	0	0	8	+0.087	4th	
2014	Pool B	3	3	0	0	0	6	+3.347	1st	Champions
2015	Pool C	3	2	1	0	0	4	–0.992	2nd	
2016	Pool C	3	1	1	0	1	3	–1.276	3rd	
2017	Super League	4	2	1	0	1	5	+0.113	2nd	

== Honours ==
- National Women's Cricket Championship:
  - Winners (2): 2005–06 & 2014

== See also ==
- Lahore cricket teams
