= Nida Dar =

Pakistani cricketer

Personal information
- Full name: Nida Dar
- Born: 2 January 1987 (age 39); Gujranwala, Punjab, Pakistan
- Nickname: Lady Boom Boom
- Batting: Right-handed
- Bowling: Right-arm off break
- Role: All-rounder

International information
- National side: Pakistan (2010–present)
- ODI debut (cap 57): 6 October 2010 v Ireland
- Last ODI: 10 November 2023 v Bangladesh
- T20I debut (cap 14): 6 May 2010 v Sri Lanka
- Last T20I: 6 October 2024 v India
- T20I shirt no.: 8

Domestic team information
- Years: Team
- 2007/08–2009/10: Pakistan Universities
- 2010/11–2018/19: Zarai Taraqiati Bank Limited
- 2014: Sialkot
- 2019/20: Sydney Thunder

Career statistics
Competition	WODI	WT20I	WLA	WT20
Matches	84	108	156	173
Runs scored	1,290	1,207	3,506	2,064
Batting average	18.16	15.08	31.87	17.64
100s/50s	0/8	0/4	3/25	0/7
Top score	87	75	204	75
Balls bowled	3,448	2,084	6,128	3,290
Wickets	74	103	178	173
Bowling average	31.01	18.16	19.93	17.50
5 wickets in innings	0	1	1	2
10 wickets in match	0	0	0	0
Best bowling	4/15	5/21	5/20	5/8
Catches/stumpings	22/–	34/–	43/–	47/–
Medal record
Representing Pakistan
Women's Cricket
Asian Games
Gold medal – first place	2010 Guangzhou	Team
Gold medal – first place	2014 Incheon	Team
- Source: CricketArchive, 21 February 2023

Nida Dar (born 2 January 1987) is a Pakistani cricketer who plays as a right-handed batter and right-arm off break bowler. She captained the Pakistan women's national cricket team for 24 WT20Is and 13 WODIs between April 2023 and August 2024.

An all-rounder, Dar is the most successful women's T20I bowler. She is the first Pakistani cricketer to take 100 wickets in T20Is. She has played domestic cricket for Pakistan Universities, Zarai Taraqiati Bank Limited, Sialkot and Sydney Thunder.

== Career ==
Dar made her One Day International debut against Ireland on 6 October 2010 in Potchefstroom, South Africa.

She made her Women's Twenty20 International (WT20I) debut on 6 May 2010 against Sri Lanka at Basseterre, St. Kitts. She was selected to play in the 2010 Asian Games in China, where she was part of the Pakistan team that won the Asian women's cricket gold medal.

On 6 June 2018, during the 2018 Women's Twenty20 Asia Cup match against Sri Lanka, she took her first five-wicket haul and the best bowling figures by a Pakistan woman in WT20Is. She finished the tournament as the highest wicket-taker for Pakistan, with eleven dismissals in five matches.

In October 2018, she was named in Pakistan's squad for the 2018 ICC Women's World Twenty20 tournament in the West Indies. Following the conclusion of the tournament, she was named as the standout player in the team by the International Cricket Council (ICC). In January 2020, she was named in Pakistan's squad for the 2020 ICC Women's T20 World Cup in Australia. In Pakistan's match against England, she played in her 100th WT20I match.

In June 2021, Dar was named in the Pakistan's squad across all formats for their away series against the West Indies. In the opening match of the T20I series, she picked up her 100th wicket by dismissing Deandra Dottin in the 10th over of the first innings, and became the first bowler, male or female to take 100 wickets in T20I cricket for Pakistan. Following the match, the Pakistan Cricket Board (PCB) congratulated her for achieving the feat.

In October 2021, she was named in Pakistan's team for the 2021 Women's Cricket World Cup Qualifier tournament in Zimbabwe. In January 2022, she was named as the vice-captain of Pakistan's team for the 2022 Women's Cricket World Cup in New Zealand. In May 2022, she was named in Pakistan's team for the cricket tournament at the 2022 Commonwealth Games in Birmingham, England.

In April 2023, the Pakistan Cricket Board appointed Dar as captain of the women's national team. She was succeeded as all-format captain by Fatima Sana in August 2024.

In December 2023, Dar led the Pakistan women's national cricket team to a historic win against the New Zealand women's national cricket team, winning their first T20I series out of Asia and Ireland, and being the first Asian team to beat New Zealand in New Zealand.

She was named in the Pakistan squad for the 2024 ICC Women's T20 World Cup.

== Personal life ==
Dar's nickname, "Lady Boom Boom", is an allusion to her batting firepower and a reference to the explosive batting style of Pakistani former cricketer Shahid Afridi, commonly known as Boom Boom Afridi. Her father Rashid Dar was a first-class cricketer.

== Awards ==
- PCB's Women's Cricketer of the Year: 2021
