= Bismah Maroof =

Pakistani cricketer

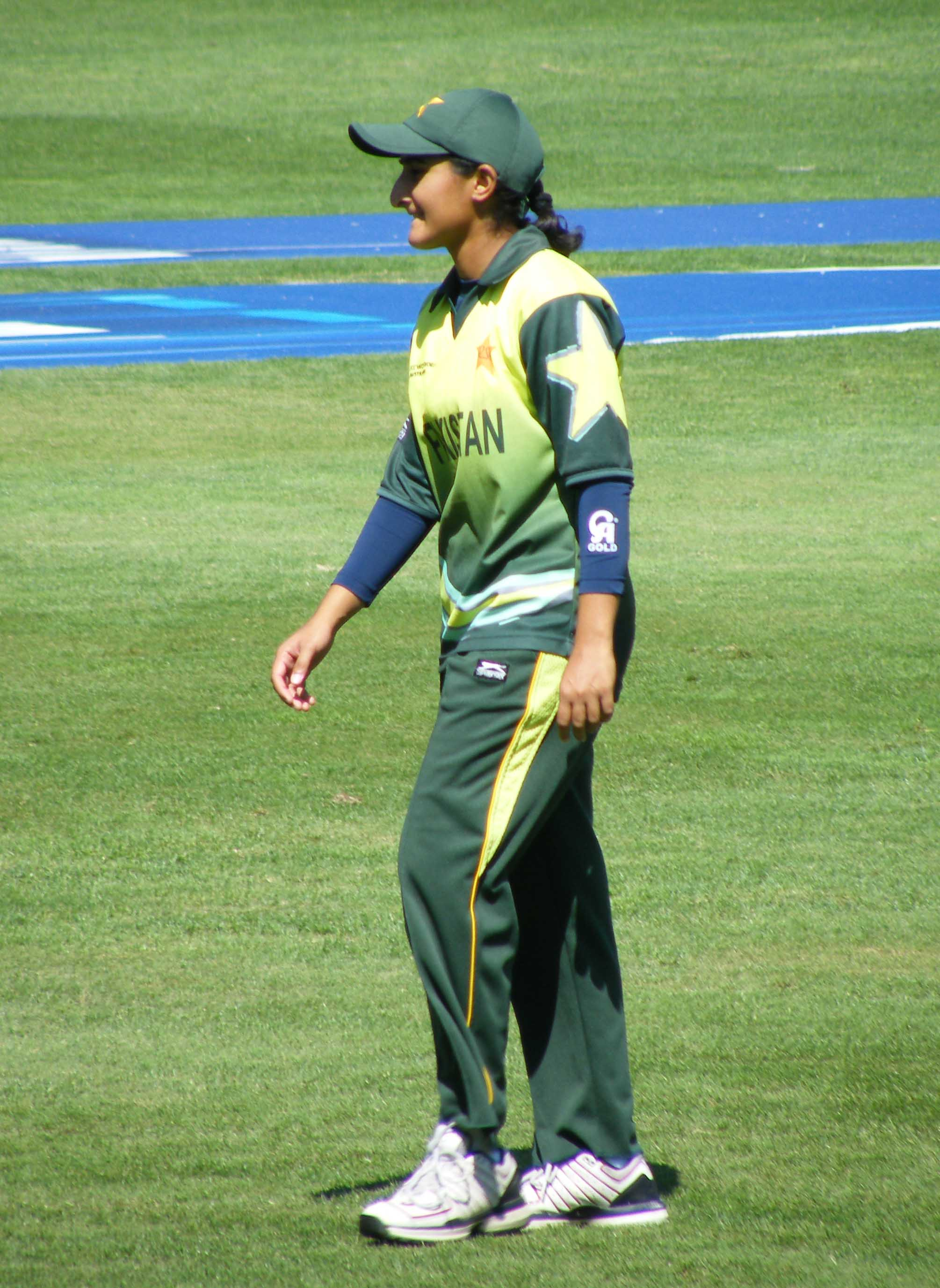

Personal information
- Full name: Bismah Maroof
- Born: 18 July 1991 (age 35); Lahore, Punjab, Pakistan
- Batting: Left-handed
- Bowling: Right-arm leg break
- Role: All-rounder

International information
- National side: Pakistan (2006–2024)
- ODI debut (cap 45): 13 December 2006 v India
- Last ODI: 23 April 2024 v West Indies
- ODI shirt no.: 3
- T20I debut (cap 13): 29 May 2009 v Ireland
- Last T20I: 5 December 2023 v New Zealand
- T20I shirt no.: 3

Domestic team information
- Years: Team
- 2006/07: Lahore
- 2009/10–2018/19: Zarai Taraqiati Bank Limited
- 2009/10: Pakistan Universities
- 2014: Lahore

Career statistics
Competition	WODI	WT20I	WLA	WT20
Matches	136	140	209	216
Runs scored	3,369	2,893	5,874	5,041
Batting average	29.55	27.55	37.72	34.29
100s/50s	0/21	0/12	5/37	0/32
Top score	99	70*	159	77*
Balls bowled	1,757	898	3,090	1,527
Wickets	44	36	97	73
Bowling average	26.68	23.30	18.10	17.65
5 wickets in innings	0	0	0	0
10 wickets in match	0	0	0	0
Best bowling	4/7	3/21	4/7	3/6
Catches/stumpings	40/–	37/–	66/–	72/–
Medal record
Representing Pakistan
Women's Cricket
Asian Games
Gold medal – first place	2010 Guangzhou	Team
Gold medal – first place	2014 Incheon	Team
- Source: CricketArchive, 25 April 2024

Bismah Maroof (born 18 July 1991) is a Pakistani former cricketer who played as an all-rounder, batting left-handed and bowling right-arm leg break. In June 2022, she became the highest runs scorer for the Pakistan women's cricket team in both ODI and T20I formats (more than 2000 runs in each). She has appeared for Pakistan in over 200 matches, captained the side between 2013 and 2020, and was the first woman to score 1,000 runs in ODIs for Pakistan. In April 2021, Maroof took a break from cricket to give birth, before confirming her return to availability in December 2021 ahead of the 2022 World Cup. She has played domestic cricket for Lahore, Zarai Taraqiati Bank Limited and Pakistan Universities. As of 2022, she holds the world record for having scored the most runs in the history of Women's ODIs without a single career century with 3,017 runs.

On 23 March 2023, Bismah was awarded the Tamgha-e-Imtiaz, Pakistan's fourth-highest civilian honour.

== Early life ==
Bismah was born into a Kashmiri family. Her parents being well-educated, were in favour of her pursuing an academic career and establishing herself in the world of medicine. As she grew into her late teens, her interest for cricket developed, and that too to such an extent, that while at Lahore College for Women University, her passion peaked and so she decided to step out of academics, after completion of high school, into the cricketing sphere, leaving behind the ambitions of becoming a doctor. She broke into the Pakistan national set-up at the age of 15.

== International career ==
She made her ODI debut on 13 December 2006 at the age of 15 against India during the 2006 Women's Asia Cup and she made an impressive start to her ODI career scoring 43 runs off 76 balls while opening the batting. She made her WT20I debut on 29 May 2009 against Ireland during the 2009 RSA T20 Cup.

She was part of the Pakistan squad at the 2009 Women's Cricket World Cup in Australia. She was part of the team that won a gold medal against Bangladesh at the 2010 Asian Games in China. She was named vice-captain of the Pakistan squad that won a second successive gold medal against Bangladesh at the 2014 Asian Games in South Korea. In 2016, she was named as the captain of the Pakistan women T20I side.

She was ruled out of the 2017 Women's Cricket World Cup due to a hand injury and was replaced in the squad by Iram Javed. She later replaced Sana Mir as the captain of the Pakistan team with the latter being removed after the 2017 Women's Cricket World Cup tournament where Pakistan lost all their matches. On 11 October 2017, Bismah was selected as captain of the Pakistan women's cricket team ahead of the New Zealand series in the UAE. In the series, Pakistan won their first ever ODI against the New Zealand in the third match.

In March 2018, under her captaincy Pakistan clean swept Sri Lanka 3-0 in the ODI series on the Sri Lanka tour. This was only the second time that Pakistan team won an ODI series 3-0. In the T20 series, Pakistan defeated Sri Lanka 2-1.

She was the leading run-scorer for Pakistan in the 2018 Women's Twenty20 Asia Cup, with 143 runs in five matches.

In October 2018, she was named in Pakistan's squad for the 2018 ICC Women's World Twenty20 tournament in the West Indies but opted to stay aside from captaincy which made room for Javeria Khan to lead the side. Prior to the 2018 ICC WT20 campaign, she underwent an eye surgery for a sinus problem and it raised doubts over her cricketing future. In January 2019, she returned as skipper of the side for the home WODI and WT20I series against the West Indies. In October 2019, she was named as the captain of the Women's Global Development Squad, ahead of a five-match series in Australia.

In January 2020, she was named as the captain of Pakistan's squad for the 2020 ICC Women's T20 World Cup in Australia. However, on 28 February 2020, in the match against England, she broke her right thumb. She was ruled out of the rest of the tournament, with Nahida Khan named as her replacement and Javeria Khan captaining the side in her absence.

In December 2020, she was shortlisted as one of the Women's Cricketer of the Year for the 2020 PCB Awards. In April 2021, Maroof announced that she was taking an indefinite break from cricket "as motherhood beckons". She became the first Pakistani cricketer to be a beneficiary of the Pakistan Cricket Board's maternity policy for the players which allows benefits for expecting mothers and fathers. After giving birth to a baby girl in August 2021, in December Maroof announced that she was returning to availability for Pakistan ahead of the 2022 World Cup.

In January 2022, she was named as the captain of Pakistan's team for the 2022 Women's Cricket World Cup in New Zealand. In May 2022, she was named as the captain of Pakistan's team for the cricket tournament at the 2022 Commonwealth Games in Birmingham, England.

After an impressive T20 series against Sri Lanka where she had a strike rate of 85.52 with the bat, Maroof was nominated for the May 2022 ICC Women’s Player of the Month Award alongside teammate Tuba Hassan and Jersey player Trinity Smith.

She stepped down as all-format captain in March 2023, and was succeeded by Nida Dar. On 25 April 2024, she announced her retirement from international cricket.

== Awards and honours ==
In 2023, Bismah was awarded with Tamgha-e-Imtiaz in honour of her remarkable services to Pakistan Women Cricket Team.
