= 2006 Women's Asia Cup =

Cricket tournament in India

Women's One Day International Asia Cup
- Dates: 13 – 21 December 2006
- Administrator: Asian Cricket Council
- Cricket format: One Day International
- Tournament format: Round-robin
- Host: India
- Champions: India (3rd title)
- Runners-up: Sri Lanka
- Participants: 3
- Matches: 7
- Player of the series: (India) Thirush Kamini (Sri Lanka) Dedunu Silva
- Most runs: (Sri Lanka) Dedunu Silva (163)
- Most wickets: (India) Thirush Kamini (8)

The 2006 Women's Asia Cup was the third edition of the Asian Cricket Council's Women's Asia Cup. The three teams which took part in the women's One Day International tournament were India, Pakistan and Sri Lanka. It was held between 13 and 21 December 2006 in India. All matches were played at the Sawai Mansingh Stadium in Jaipur. The tournament was won by India, defeating Sri Lanka by eight wickets in the final.

== Squads ==
Squads
| India | Sri Lanka | Pakistan |
|---|---|---|
| Mithali Raj (c) | Shashikala Siriwardene (c) | Urooj Mumtaz (c) |
| Sulakshana Naik (wk) | Dilani Manodara (wk) | Batool Fatima (wk) |
| Thirush Kamini | Dedunu Silva | Tasqeen Qadeer |
| Anjum Chopra | Chamari Polgampola | Bismah Maroof |
| Hemlata Kala | Suwini de Alwis | Sana Javed |
| Rumeli Dhar | Hiroshi Abeysinghe | Sajjida Shah |
| Reema Malhotra | Eshani Kaushalya | Sana Mir |
| Amita Sharma | Inoka Galagedara | Qanita Jalil |
| Jhulan Goswami | Sandamali Dolawatte | Maryam Butt |
| Nooshin Al Khadeer | Sumudu Fernando | Asmavia Iqbal |
| Preeti Dimri | Sripali Weerakkody | Sabahat Rasheed |
| Rajeshwari Goyal | Sanduni Abeywickrema | Khursheed Jabeen |
| Devika Palshikar | Randika Galhenage (wk) | Shumaila Mushtaq |
| Sunetra Paranjpe | Nirosha Kumari | Nain Abidi |

== Group stage table ==
Asia Cup 2006
| Pos | Team | Pld | W | L | NR | Pts | NRR |
|---|---|---|---|---|---|---|---|
| 1 | India | 4 | 4 | 0 | 0 | 16 | 0.965 |
| 2 | Sri Lanka | 4 | 2 | 2 | 0 | 8 | 0.851 |
| 3 | Pakistan | 4 | 0 | 4 | 0 | 0 | −1.707 |

Source: ESPNcricinfo

== Match summary ==
13 December 2006
Scorecard

| India; 239/9 (50 overs) | v | Pakistan; 159/6 (50 overs) |
| Rumeli Dhar 53 (94); Qanita Jalil 5/62 (10 overs) | | Sajjida Shah 44 (53); Thirush Kamini 3/19 (10 overs) |

India Women won by 80 runs
Sawai Mansingh Stadium, Jaipur
Umpires: Anil Chaudhary (Ind) and Devendra Sharma (Ind)
Player of the match: Amita Sharma (Ind)

- India Women won the toss and elected to bat.
- Thirush Kamini (Ind) and Bismah Maroof (Pak) both made their women's ODI debut.
- Qanita Jalil (Pak) took her maiden five wicket haul in a women's ODI match.

14 December 2006
Scorecard

| Pakistan; 147/9 (50 overs) | v | Sri Lanka; 151/3 (43.2 overs) |
| Tasqeen Qadeer 37 (90); Shashikala Siriwardene 4/34 (10 overs) | | Chamari Polgampola 53 (116); Sabahat Rasheed 1/17 (4 overs) |

Sri Lanka Women won by 7 wickets
Sawai Mansingh Stadium, Jaipur
Umpires: Anil Chaudhary (Ind) and Devendra Sharma (Ind)
Player of the match: Shashikala Siriwardene (SL)

- Sri Lanka Women won the toss and elected to bat.
- Dilani Manodara and Sripali Weerakkody (SL) both made their women's ODI debut.

15 December 2006
Scorecard

| Sri Lanka; 145/8 (50 overs) | v | India; 151/0 (31.3 overs) |
| Shashikala Siriwardene 40 (70); Preeti Dimri 3/14 (8 overs) | | Sulakshana Naik 79* (93) |

India Women won by 10 wickets
Sawai Mansingh Stadium, Jaipur
Umpires: Anil Chaudhary (Ind) and Devendra Sharma (Ind)
Player of the match: Sulakshana Naik (Ind) and Thirush Kamini (Ind)

- India Women won the toss and elected to field.
- Rajeshwari Goyal (Ind) and Sanduni Abeywickrema (SL) both made their women's ODI debut.

17 December 2006
Scorecard

| Pakistan; 166/7 (50 overs) | v | Sri Lanka; 167/5 (39.4 overs) |
| Sana Mir 35 (67); Eshani Kaushalya 3/40 (10 overs) | | Dedunu Silva 50 (66); Sajjida Shah 2/46 (10 overs) |

Sri Lanka Women won by 5 wickets
Sawai Mansingh Stadium, Jaipur
Umpires: Ramesh Jadhav (Ind) and Ramamurthy Sundar (Ind)
Player of the match: Eshani Kaushalya (SL)

- Pakistan Women won the toss and elected to bat.

18 December 2006
Scorecard

| Sri Lanka; 171 (49.3 overs) | v | India; 172/3 (47.2 overs) |
| Dedunu Silva 78 (119); Thirush Kamini 2/9 (4 overs) | | Mithali Raj 68* (108); Chamari Polgampola 1/23 (8 overs) |

India Women won by 7 wickets
Sawai Mansingh Stadium, Jaipur
Umpires: Ramesh Jadhav (Ind) and Ramamurthy Sundar (Ind)
Player of the match: Mithali Raj (Ind)

- Sri Lanka Women won the toss and elected to bat.
- Nirosha Kumari (SL) made her women's ODI debut.

19 December 2006
Scorecard

| India; 244/7 (50 overs) | v | Pakistan; 141/8 (50 overs) |
| Sunetra Paranjpe 52 (67); Sana Mir 3/37 (10 overs) | | Urooj Mumtaz 33 (72); Rajeshwari Goyal 2/12 (10 overs) |

India Women won by 103 runs
Sawai Mansingh Stadium, Jaipur
Umpires: Sanjeev Dua (Ind) and Vishwas Nerurkar (Ind)
Player of the match: Rajeshwari Goyal (Ind)

- India Women won the toss and elected to bat.
- Nain Abidi (Pak) made her women's ODI debut.
- Sanjeev Dua made his women's ODI debut as an umpire.

== Final ==
21 December 2006
Scorecard

| Sri Lanka; 93 (44.1 overs) | v | India; 95/2 (27.5 overs) |
| Chamari Polgampola 22 (65); Rumeli Dhar 2/11(7 overs) | | Sunetra Paranjpe 35* (59); Chamari Polgampola 1/22 (7 overs) |

India Women won by 8 wickets
Sawai Mansingh Stadium, Jaipur
Umpires: Sanjeev Dua (Ind) and Vishwas Nerurkar (Ind)
Player of the match: Sunetra Paranjpe (Ind)

- Sri Lanka Women won the toss and elected to bat.
