= Pakistan women's cricket team in Australia and New Zealand in 1996–97 =

Pakistan women's cricket team in New Zealand in 1996–97
	New Zealand	Pakistan
- Dates: 10 – 29 January 1997
Captains	Maia Lewis	Shaiza Khan

One Day International series
- Results: New Zealand won the 2-match series 2–0
Most runs	Maia Lewis (105)	Kiran Baluch (19)
Most wickets	Julie Harris (6); Justine Fryer (6)	Sharmeen Khan (2)

The Pakistan women's national cricket team toured New Zealand and Australia in January and February 1997. They played New Zealand in two One Day Internationals (ODIs) and Australia in a single ODI, losing all three matches. The matches were the first ever played by a Pakistan women's national team, with a side put together by sisters Shaiza and Sharmeen Khan against strong opposition from groups within Pakistan. The team needed to play the three international matches on the tour to qualify for the 1997 World Cup.

== Tour of New Zealand ==
=== Squads ===
New Zealand	Pakistan
Maia Lewis (c); Trudy Anderson; Catherine Campbell; Helen Daly; Emily Drumm; Shelley Fruin; Justine Fryer; Julie Harris; Debbie Hockley; Katrina Keenan; Karen Le Comber; Clare Nicholson; Rebecca Rolls (wk)	Shaiza Khan (c); Kiran Baluch; Maliha Hussain; Nazli Istiaq; Najmunnissa Ismail (wk); Aisha Jalil; Shabana Kausar; Abida Khan; Sharmeen Khan; Meher Minwalla; Shahnaz Sohail; Sultana Yousaf

=== Tour Matches ===
Pakistan Women played 12 tour matches in New Zealand, but only the two matches below have available scorecards:

==== 50-over match: Canterbury v Pakistan ====
10 January 1997
Scorecard

Canterbury; 425/6 (50 overs)	v	Pakistan; 44 (34.1 overs)
Katrina Keenan 112 (79); Sultana Yousaf 1/35 (5 overs)		Shaiza Khan 23 (–); Helen Watson 4/13 (10 overs)

Canterbury Women won by 381 runs
Garrick Park, Christchurch
Umpires: Eddie Brownlee (NZ) and Jeremy Busby (NZ)

- Toss unknown.

==== 50-over match: Otago v Pakistan ====
19 January 1997
Scorecard

Pakistan; 84 (42.5 overs)	v	Otago; 85/4 (27.5 overs)
Shaiza Khan 33 (–); Amanda Guthrie 3/5 (– overs)		Rachel Pullar 20* (–); Shaiza Khan 4/22 (10 overs)

Otago Women won by 6 wickets
Molyneux Park, Alexandra

- Pakistan Women won the toss and elected to bat.
- Full scorecard unavailable.

=== WODI Series ===
==== 1st ODI ====
28 January 1997
Scorecard

Pakistan; 56 (33.3 overs)	v	New Zealand; 57/0 (8.1 overs)
Kiran Baluch 19 (41); Julie Harris 4/8 (6 overs)		Karen Le Comber 32* (23)

New Zealand Women won by 10 wickets
Hagley Oval, Christchurch
Umpires: Barry Frost (NZ) and Grant Robinson (NZ)

- Pakistan Women won the toss and elected to bat.
- Helen Daly, Justine Fryer, Rebecca Rolls (NZ), Kiran Baluch, Maliha Hussain, Najmunnissa Ismail, Aisha Jalil, Shabana Kausar, Abida Khan, Shaiza Khan, Sharmeen Khan, Meher Minwalla, Shahnaz Sohail and Sultana Yousaf (Pak) all made their WODI debuts.

==== 2nd ODI ====
29 January 1997
Scorecard

New Zealand; 455/5 (50 overs)	v	Pakistan; 47 (23 overs)
Maia Lewis 105 (72); Sharmeen Khan 2/87 (10 overs)		Sharmeen Khan 11 (14); Clare Nicholson 4/18 (7 overs)

New Zealand Women won by 408 runs
Hagley Oval, Christchurch
Umpires: Barry Frost (NZ) and Grant Robinson (NZ)

- Pakistan Women won the toss and elected to field.

== Tour of Australia ==
Pakistan women's cricket team in Australia in 1996–97
	Australia	Pakistan
- Date: 7 February 1997
Captains	Belinda Clark	Shaiza Khan

One Day International series
- Results: Australia won the 1-match series 1–0
Most runs	Lisa Keightley (156)	Shabana Kausar (6)
Most wickets	Olivia Magno (4)	4 bowlers (1)

=== Squads ===
Australia	Pakistan
Belinda Clark (c); Lisa Keightley; Zoe Goss; Karen Rolton; Mel Jones; Cherie Bambury; Joanne Broadbent; Olivia Magno; Julia Price (wk); Charmaine Mason; Avril Fahey	Shaiza Khan (c); Kiran Baluch; Maliha Hussain; Nazli Istiaq (wk); Najmunnissa Ismail; Aisha Jalil; Shabana Kausar; Abida Khan; Sharmeen Khan; Meher Minwalla; Shahnaz Sohail; Sultana Yousaf

=== Only WODI ===
7 February 1997
Scorecard

Australia; 397/4 (50 overs)	v	Pakistan; 23 (24.1 overs)
Lisa Keightley 156* (147); Aisha Jalil 1/15 (2 overs)		Shabana Kausar 6 (18); Olivia Magno 4/11 (5 overs)

Australia Women won by 374 runs
Wesley Cricket Ground, Melbourne
Umpires: Bob Stratford (Aus) and Paul Jensen (Aus)

- Australia Women won the toss and elected to bat.
- Cherie Bambury, Avril Fahey, Mel Jones, Charmaine Mason (Aus) and Nazli Istiaq (Pak) all made their WODI debuts.
