= 2008 Women's Asia Cup =

Cricket tournament in Sri Lanka

Women's One Day International Asia Cup
- Dates: 2 – 11 May 2008
- Administrator: Asian Cricket Council
- Cricket format: One Day International, 50-over cricket
- Tournament format: Group Stage with Finals
- Host: Sri Lanka
- Champions: India (4th title)
- Runners-up: Sri Lanka
- Participants: 4
- Matches: 13
- Player of the series: (India) Rumeli Dhar

The 2008 Women's One-Day Internationals Asia Cup was the fourth edition of the ACC Women's Asia Cup, a Women's One Day International cricket tournament organized by the Asian Cricket Council. Four teams took part in the tournament: Bangladesh, India, Pakistan and Sri Lanka. Matches involving Bangladesh did not have ODI status. It was held between 2 May and 11 May 2008, in Sri Lanka. The matches were played at the Welagedara Stadium and Rangiri Dambulla International Stadium. India won the final against Sri Lanka by 177 runs.

== Tournament structure ==
Each side played each other two in the group stages. The top 2 teams based on points at the end of the group stages met each other in a one-off final. Each win yielded 4 points while a tie/no result yielded 2 points and Bonus yielded 1-point.

== Squads ==
Squads
India	Sri Lanka	Pakistan	Bangladesh
Mithali Raj (c)	Shashikala Siriwardene (c)	Urooj Mumtaz (c)	Salma Khatun (c)
Jhulan Goswami	Chamari Polgampola	Almas Akram	Ayasha Rahman
Neetu David	Chamika Bandara	Asmavia Iqbal	Chamely Khatun
Anagha Deshpande	Suwini de Alwis	Batool Fatima (wk)	Irin Sultana
Rumeli Dhar	Sandamali Dolawatte	Bismah Maroof	Jahanara Alam
Karu Jain (wk)	Sumudu Fernando	Javeria Khan	Lily Rani Biswas
Thirush Kamini	Inoka Galagedara	Nain Abidi	Mina Khatun
Devika Palshikar	Janakanthy Mala	Qanita Jalil	Panna Ghosh
Snehal Pradhan	Eshani Kaushalya	Sadia Yousuf	Papiya Haque
Seema Pujare	Deepika Rasangika	Sajjida Shah	Rumana Ahmed
Asha Rawat	Chamani Seneviratna	Sana Javed	Shamima Akhter
Priyanka Roy	Dedunu Silva	Sana Mir	Shukhtara Rahman
Amita Sharma	Dilani Manodara (wk)	Shumaila Mushtaq	Tithy Sarkar
Jaya Sharma	Sripali Weerakkody	Tasqeen Qadeer	
Gouher Sultana	–	–	

== Group stage table ==
Asia Cup 2008
Pos	Team	Pld	W	L	NR	BP	Pts	NRR
1	India	6	6	0	0	4	28	2.550
2	Sri Lanka (H)	6	4	2	0	4	20	0.851
3	Pakistan	6	1	5	0	1	5	−1.707
4	Bangladesh	6	1	5	0	0	4	−1.494

Source: ESPNcricinfo
(H) Host

== Match summary ==
2 May
Scorecard

India; 250/3 (50 overs)	v	Bangladesh; 68 all out (30.2 overs)
Mithali Raj 109 * (92); Chamely Khatun 1/23 (5 overs)		Irin Sultana 19 (50); Seema Pujare 5/17 (8.2 overs)

India won by 182 runs
Welagedara Stadium, Kurunegala
Umpires: MWDP de Silva and RMPJ Rambukwella
Player of the match: (India) Mithali Raj

- India Women won the toss and elected to bat.

2 May
Scorecard

Sri Lanka; 225 /5 (50 overs)	v	Pakistan; 129/8 (50 overs)
Dedunu Silva 76 (101); Almas Akram 1/33 (9 overs)		Urooj Mumtaz 33 * (67); Suwini de Alwis 2/30 (10 overs)

Sri Lanka won by 96 runs
Rangiri Dambulla International Stadium
Umpires: HDPK Dharmasena and RD Kottahachchi
Player of the match: (Sri Lanka) Dedunu Silva

- Pakistan Women won the toss and elected to field.

3 May
Scorecard

Pakistan; 134 all out (47.4 overs)	v	Bangladesh; 136/6 (45.3 overs)
Bismah Maroof 29 (53); Tithy Sarkar 4/25 (9.4 overs)		Salma Khatun 53 * (92); Sajjida Shah 2/19 (10 overs)

Bangladesh won by 4 wickets
Welagedara Stadium, Kurunegala
Umpires: MWDP de Silva and KC Fernando
Player of the match: (Bangladesh) Salma Khatun

- Pakistan Women won the toss and elected to bat.

3 May
Scorecard

India; 227/8 (50 overs)	v	Sri Lanka; 198 all out (49.5 overs)
Mithali Raj 54 * (63); Suwini de Alwis 3/36 (10 overs)		Dedunu Silva 74 (87); Rumeli Dhar 3/28 (10 overs)

India won by 29 runs
Rangiri Dambulla International Stadium
Umpires: D Ekanayake and RD Kottahachchi
Player of the match: (India) Mithali Raj

- India Women won the toss and elected to bat.
- Seema Pujare and Priyanka Roy (Ind) made their ODI debuts.

5 May
Scorecard

India; 275/7 (50 overs)	v	Pakistan; 93/9(50 overs)
Rumeli Dhar 92 * (94); Asmavia Iqbal 2/37 (10 overs)		Sajjida Shah 16 (30); Gouher Sultana 3/9 (10 overs)

India won by 182 runs
Welagedara Stadium, Kurunegala
Umpires: W Jayasena and MVD Zilva
Player of the match: (India) Rumeli Dhar

- India Women won the toss and elected to bat.
- Gouher Sultana (Ind) made her ODI debut.

5 May
Scorecard

Bangladesh; 94 all out (46 overs)	v	Sri Lanka; 95/2(19.3 overs)
Shathira Jakir 25 (43); Suwini de Alwis 3/13 (10 overs)		Chamari Polgampola 32 * (62); Panna Ghosh 1/21 (5 overs)

Sri Lanka won by 8 wickets
Rangiri Dambulla International Stadium
Umpires: MSK Nandiweera and RR Wimalasiri
Player of the match: (Sri Lanka) Chamari Polgampola

- Bangladesh won the toss and elected to bat.

6 May
Scorecard

Bangladesh; 160 all out (50 overs)	v	India; 161/5(41 overs)
Salma Khatun 90 * (140); Thirush Kamini 2/14 (5 overs)		Karu Jain 33 * (50); Shathira Jakir 1/31 (8 overs)

India won by 5 wickets
Rangiri Dambulla International Stadium
Umpires: JWL Nandana and RR Wimalasiri
Player of the match: (Bangladesh) Salma Khatun

- Bangladesh won the toss and elected to bat.

6 May
Scorecard

Sri Lanka; 194/9(50 overs)	v	Pakistan; 149 all out (45 overs)
Eshani Kaushalya 44(55); Urooj Mumtaz 4/31 (10 overs)		Urooj Mumtaz 57 * (106); Chamari Polgampola 4/26 (10 overs)

Sri Lanka won by 45 runs
Welagedara Stadium, Kurunegala
Umpires: KK Jayaweera and MSK Nandiweera
Player of the match: (Sri Lanka) Eshani Kaushalya

- Sri Lanka won the toss and elected to field.
- Javeria Khan (Pak) made her ODI debut.

8 May
Scorecard

Pakistan; 110 all out (44.4 overs)	v	Bangladesh; 72 all out (33.1 overs)
Asmavia Iqbal 28(52); Tithy Sarkar 3/29 (10 overs)		Shathira Jakir 19 (49); Javeria Khan 6/8 (8.1 overs)

Pakistan won by 38 runs
Rangiri Dambulla International Stadium
Umpires: EJAPAM Jayasooriya and SH Sarathkumara
Player of the match: (Pakistan) Javeria Khan

- Pakistan won the toss and elected to bat.

8 May
Scorecard

Sri Lanka; 123/9 (50 overs)	v	India; 124/2 (26 overs)
Dilani Manodara 33* (97); Seema Pujare 3/35 (10 overs)		Asha Rawat 56 * (71); Janakanthy Mala 1/19 (5 overs)

India won by 8 wickets
Welagedara Stadium, Kurunegala
Umpires: NS Bopage and BPJ Mendis
Player of the match: (India) Seema Pujare

- Sri Lanka won the toss and elected to bat.

9 May
Scorecard

India; 283/3 (50 overs)	v	Pakistan; 76 all out (33.3 overs)
Jaya Sharma 74 * (91); Sana Mir 1/52(10 overs)		Javeria Khan 20 (40); Neetu David 3/9 (7 overs)

India won by 207 runs
Rangiri Dambulla International Stadium
Umpires: EJAPAM Jayasooriya and KM Kottahachchi
Player of the match: (India) Jaya Sharma

- India won the toss and elected to bat.
- Anagha Deshpande and Snehal Pradhan (Ind) made their ODI debuts.

9 May
Scorecard

Bangladesh; 120 all out (49.3 overs)	v	Sri Lanka; 123/1 (25.5 overs)
Ayesha Akhter 30 (75); Janakanthy Mala 3/9 (10 overs)		Dedunu Silva 66 * (82); Rumana Ahmed 1/14 (4 overs)

Sri Lanka won by 9 wickets
Welagedara Stadium, Kurunegala
Umpires: RD Kottahachchi and BPJ Mendis
Player of the match: (Sri Lanka) Dedunu Silva

- Sri Lanka won the toss and elected to field.

== Final ==
11 May
Scorecard

India; 260/7 (50 overs)	v	Sri Lanka; 83 all out (35.2 overs)
Asha Rawat 97 (114); Shashikala Siriwardene 4/53 (8 overs)		Chamari Polgampola 23 (63); Seema Pujare 3/10 (10 overs)

India won by 177 runs
Welagedara Stadium, Kurunegala
Umpires: KK Jayaweera and RA Kottahachchi
Player of the match: (India) Rumeli Dhar

- India won the toss and elected to bat.
