= 2005–06 Women's Asia Cup =

Cricket tournament in Pakistan

Women's One Day International Asia Cup
- Dates: 29 December 2005 – 4 January 2006
- Administrator: Asian Cricket Council
- Cricket format: One Day International
- Host: Pakistan
- Champions: India (2nd title)
- Runners-up: Sri Lanka
- Participants: 3
- Matches: 7
- Most runs: (India) Jaya Sharma (258)
- Most wickets: (India) Neetu David (9)

The Women's Asia Cup in Pakistan in 2005–06 was an Asian Cricket Council Women's One Day International cricket tournament. The three teams which took part in the tournament were India, Pakistan and Sri Lanka. It was held between 28 December 2005 and 4 January 2006, in Karachi, Pakistan. The matches were played at the National Stadium, Karachi and Karachi Gymkhana Ground. India won the final against Sri Lanka by 97 runs.

== Squads ==
Squads
India	Sri Lanka	Pakistan
Mithali Raj (c)	Shashikala Siriwardene (c)	Sana Javed (c) & (wk)
Karu Jain (wk)	Randika Galhenage (wk)	Batool Fatima (wk)
Jaya Sharma	Dedunu Silva	Tasqeen Qadeer
Anjum Chopra	Chamari Polgampola	Sajjida Shah
Neetu David	Hiroshi Abeysinghe	Urooj Mumtaz
Nooshin Al Khadeer	Suwini de Alwis	Sana Mir
Rumeli Dhar	Praba Udawatte	Armaan Khan
Jhulan Goswami	Eshani Kaushalya	Asmavia Iqbal
Amita Sharma	Inoka Galagedara	Qanita Jalil
Reema Malhotra	Janakanthy Mala	Maryam Butt
Asha Rawat	Wickramasinghe Chandrawathi	Sabahat Rasheed
Monica Sumra	Dona Indralatha	Shumaila Mushtaq
Varsha Raffel	Dumila Dedunu (wk)	Humera Masroor
Devika Palshikar	Sumudu Fernando	-

== Match summary ==
28 December 2005
Scorecard

Sri Lanka; 178/9 (50overs)	v	Pakistan; 164 all out (48.2 overs)
Dedunu Silva 52 (124); Urooj Mumtaz 3/40 (10 overs)		Tasqeen Qadeer 42 (76); Shashikala Siriwardene 3/33 (9.2 overs)

Sri Lanka Women won by 14 runs
National Stadium, Karachi
Umpires: Mian Mohammad Aslam and Saleem Badar
Player of the match: (Sri Lanka) LDVV Silva

- Sri Lanka Women won the toss and elected to bat.
- Armaan Khan, Asmavia Iqbal, Qanita Jalil, Sabahat Rasheed, Sana Javed, Sana Mir and Tasqeen Qadeer (Pak) made their ODI debuts.

29 December 2005
Scorecard

Sri Lanka; 115 all out (48.5overs)	v	India; 118/0 (27.3overs)
Chamari Polgampola 23 (53); N Al Khadeer 3/11 (10 overs)		Jaya Sharma 58* (72); Suwini de Alwis 0/9 (3 overs)

India Women won by 10 wickets
Karachi Gymkhana Ground
Umpires: Mian Mohammad Aslam and Shakeel Khan
Player of the match: (India) N Al Khadeer

- Sri Lanka Women won the toss and elected to bat.

30 December 2005
Scorecard

India; 289/2 (50 overs)	v	Pakistan; 96 all out (41.4 overs)
Jaya Sharma 138* (150); Sana Mir 1/52 (10 overs)		Tasqeen Qadeer 21 (61); Neetu David 3/7 (7.4 overs)

India Women won by 193 runs
National Stadium, Karachi
Umpires: Islam Khan and Shakeel Khan
Player of the match: (India) Jaya Sharma

- India Women won the toss and elected to bat.
- Shumaila Mushtaq (Pak) made her ODI debut.

31 December 2005
Scorecard

Sri Lanka; 123 all out (45.2 overs)	v	Pakistan; 93 all out (40.4 overs)
Praba Udawatte 28 (61); Sajjida Shah 3/18 (10 overs)		Armaan Khan 24 (18); Shashikala Siriwardene 4/11 (8 overs)

Sri Lanka Women won by 30 runs
National Stadium, Karachi
Umpires: Javed Ashraf and Riazuddin
Player of the match: (Sri Lanka) HASD Siriwardene

- Sri Lanka Women won the toss and elected to bat.

1 January 2006
Scorecard

Sri Lanka; 124 all out (49.1 overs)	v	India; 125/0 (29.1 overs)
Praba Udawatte 30 (87); Rumeli Dhar 3/10 (5 overs)		Monica Sumra 63* (81); Shashikala Siriwardene 0/17 (5.1 overs)

India Women won by 10 wickets
Karachi Gymkhana Ground
Umpires: Iftikhar Malik and Siddiq Khan
Player of the match: (India) Rumeli Dhar

- Sri Lanka Women won the toss and elected to bat.

2 January 2006
Scorecard

Pakistan; 94 all out (47.5 overs)	v	India; 95/0 (17.3 overs)
Sana Mir 27* (60); Devika Palshikar 3/12 (10 Overs)		Rumeli Dhar 54* (48); Sana Mir 0/13 (4 Overs)

India Women won by 10 wickets
National Stadium, Karachi
Umpires: Riazuddin and Saleem Badar
Player of the match: (India) Devika Palshikar

- Pakistan Women won the toss and elected to bat.
- Devika Palshikar (Ind) Humera Masroor (Pak) made their ODI debuts.

== Final ==
4 January 2006
(Scorecard)

India; 269/4 (50 overs)	v	Sri Lanka; 172/9 (50 overs)
Mithali Raj 108* (121); Shashikala Siriwardene 1/44 (10 overs)		Chamari Polgampola 58 (112); Devika Palshikar 3/31 (10 overs)

India Women won by 97 runs
National Stadium, Karachi
Umpires: Riazuddin and Saleem Badar
Player of the match: (India) Mithali Raj

- India Women won the toss and elected to bat.
