= Sri Lanka women's cricket team in Pakistan in 2022 =

International cricket tour

| | Pakistan | Sri Lanka |
- Dates: 24 May – 5 June 2022
| Captains | Bismah Maroof | Chamari Athapaththu |

One Day International series
- Results: Pakistan won the 3-match series 2–1
| Most runs | Sidra Ameen (218) | Chamari Athapaththu (142) |
| Most wickets | Fatima Sana (8) | Oshadi Ranasinghe (4) |
- Player of the series: Sidra Ameen (Pak)

Twenty20 International series
- Results: Pakistan won the 3-match series 3–0
| Most runs | Bismah Maroof (65) | Hasini Perera (63) |
| Most wickets | Tuba Hassan (5) | Oshadi Ranasinghe (6) |
- Player of the series: Tuba Hassan (Pak)

The Sri Lanka women's cricket team toured Pakistan to play against the Pakistan women's cricket team in May and June 2022. The tour consisted of three Women's One Day International (WODI) and three Women's Twenty20 International (WT20I) matches. The WODI matches formed part of the 2022–2025 ICC Women's Championship, and it was the first series of the 2022–2025 ICC Women's Championship. All of the matches were played at the Southend Club Cricket Stadium in Karachi, the first time the venue was used since the West Indies women toured in January and February 2018. On 11 May 2022, Sri Lanka confirmed their squad for the tour, with the Pakistan Cricket Board (PCB) confirming that Bismah Maroof would remain their captain the following day. On 18 May 2022, the PCB named their squads for the tour, which included three uncapped players.

Pakistan won the first WT20I match by six wickets, with Tuba Hassan taking three wickets for eight runs on her international debut. Pakistan won the second match by seven wickets, to win the series with one match to play. Pakistan won the third and final WT20I by four wickets to win the series 3–0.

Pakistan won the opening WODI match by eight wickets. Pakistan won the second WODI by 73 runs, with Sidra Ameen scoring her second WODI century, to give Pakistan a series win with a match to play. Sri Lanka 93-run win in the final match gave Pakistan the WODI series 2–1.

== Squads ==
| WODIs | | WT20Is | |
| Pakistan | Sri Lanka | Pakistan | Sri Lanka |
|---|---|---|---|
| Bismah Maroof (c); Muneeba Ali; Sidra Ameen; Anam Amin; Aiman Anwer; Diana Baig; Nida Dar; Ghulam Fatima; Gull Feroza; Sadia Iqbal; Sidra Nawaz; Aliya Riaz; Fatima Sana; Sadaf Shamas; Omaima Sohail | Chamari Athapaththu (c); Nilakshi de Silva; Kavisha Dilhari; Imesha Dulani; Ama Kanchana; Hansima Karunaratne; Achini Kulasuriya; Sugandika Kumari; Sachini Nisansala; Udeshika Prabodhani; Hasini Perera; Oshadi Ranasinghe; Inoka Ranaweera; Harshitha Samarawickrama; Anushka Sanjeewani; Prasadani Weerakkody | Bismah Maroof (c); Muneeba Ali; Anam Amin; Aiman Anwer; Diana Baig; Nida Dar; Gull Feroza; Tuba Hassan; Kainat Imtiaz; Sadia Iqbal; Iram Javed; Ayesha Naseem; Aliya Riaz; Fatima Sana; Omaima Sohail | Chamari Athapaththu (c); Nilakshi de Silva; Kavisha Dilhari; Imesha Dulani; Ama Kanchana; Achini Kulasuriya; Sugandika Kumari; Sachini Nisansala; Udeshika Prabodhani; Hasini Perera; Oshadi Ranasinghe; Inoka Ranaweera; Harshitha Samarawickrama; Anushka Sanjeewani; Prasadani Weerakkody |

Rashmi Silva, Kawya Kavindi, Sathya Sandeepani, Tharika Sewwandi and Malsha Shehani were also named as standby players in Sri Lanka's squad.

== WT20I series ==
=== 1st WT20I ===
24 May 2022
14:00
Scorecard

| Sri Lanka; 106/8 (20 overs) | v | Pakistan; 107/4 (18.2 overs) |
| Nilakshi de Silva 25 (22); Tuba Hassan 3/8 (4 overs) | | Nida Dar 37* (27); Oshadi Ranasinghe 2/20 (3.2 overs) |

Pakistan Women won by 6 wickets
Southend Club Cricket Stadium, Karachi
Umpires: Faisal Afridi (Pak) and Asif Yaqoob (Pak)
Player of the match: Tuba Hassan (Pak)

- Sri Lanka Women won the toss and elected to bat.
- Gull Feroza and Tuba Hassan (Pak) both made their WT20I debuts.
- Tuba Hassan took the best bowling figures for a player on debut for Pakistan in WT20Is.

=== 2nd WT20I ===
26 May 2022
14:00
Scorecard

| Sri Lanka; 102/6 (20 overs) | v | Pakistan; 104/3 (17.1 overs) |
| Hasini Perera 35 (51); Tuba Hassan 1/13 (4 overs) | | Ayesha Naseem 45* (31); Achini Kulasuriya 1/11 (2 overs) |

Pakistan Women won by 7 wickets
Southend Club Cricket Stadium, Karachi
Umpires: Faisal Afridi (Pak) and Imran Javed (Pak)
Player of the match: Ayesha Naseem (Pak)

- Sri Lanka Women won the toss and elected to bat.

=== 3rd WT20I ===
28 May 2022
14:00
Scorecard

| Sri Lanka; 107/8 (20 overs) | v | Pakistan; 108/6 (20 overs) |
| Chamari Athapaththu 37 (38); Nida Dar 1/1 (2 overs) | | Muneeba Ali 25 (33); Oshadi Ranasinghe 3/18 (4 overs) |

Pakistan Women won by 4 wickets
Southend Club Cricket Stadium, Karachi
Umpires: Imtiaz Iqbal (Pak) and Asif Yaqoob (Pak)
Player of the match: Bismah Maroof (Pak)

- Sri Lanka Women won the toss and elected to bat.

== WODI series ==
=== 1st WODI ===
1 June 2022
09:30
Scorecard

| Sri Lanka; 169 (47.5 overs) | v | Pakistan; 170/2 (41.5 overs) |
| Kavisha Dilhari 49* (50); Ghulam Fatima 4/21 (10 overs) | | Sidra Ameen 76 (119); Achini Kulasuriya 1/13 (5 overs) |

Pakistan Women won by 8 wickets
Southend Club Cricket Stadium, Karachi
Umpires: Faisal Afridi (Pak) and Asif Yaqoob (Pak)
Player of the match: Ghulam Fatima (Pak)

- Sri Lanka Women won the toss and elected to bat.
- Women's Championship points: Pakistan 2, Sri Lanka 0.

=== 2nd WODI ===
3 June 2022
09:30
Scorecard

| Pakistan; 253/2 (50 overs) | v | Sri Lanka; 180/9 (50 overs) |
| Sidra Ameen 123 (150); Kavisha Dilhari 1/43 (10 overs) | | Harshitha Samarawickrama 41 (48); Fatima Sana 4/26 (10 overs) |

Pakistan Women won by 73 runs
Southend Club Cricket Stadium, Karachi
Umpires: Faisal Afridi (Pak) and Imran Javed (Pak)
Player of the match: Sidra Ameen (Pak)

- Pakistan Women won the toss and elected to bat.
- Sachini Nisansala (SL) made her WODI debut.
- Muneeba Ali and Sidra Ameen 158 runs for the first wicket was the highest opening partnership for Pakistan in WODIs.
- Women's Championship points: Pakistan 2, Sri Lanka 0.

=== 3rd WODI ===
5 June 2022
09:30
Scorecard

| Sri Lanka; 260/7 (50 overs) | v | Pakistan; 167 (41.4 overs) |
| Chamari Athapaththu 101 (85); Anam Amin 2/43 (10 overs) | | Aliya Riaz 56 (82); Chamari Athapaththu 2/20 (6 overs) |

Sri Lanka Women won by 93 runs
Southend Club Cricket Stadium, Karachi
Umpires: Imtiaz Iqbal (Pak) and Asif Yaqoob (Pak)
Player of the match: Chamari Athapaththu (SL)

- Sri Lanka Women won the toss and elected to bat.
- Women's Championship points: Sri Lanka 2, Pakistan 0.
