= Ireland women's cricket team in Pakistan in 2022–23 =

International cricket tour

	Pakistan	Ireland
- Dates: 4 – 16 November 2022
Captains	Bismah Maroof	Laura Delany

One Day International series
- Results: Pakistan won the 3-match series 3–0
Most runs	Sidra Ameen (277)	Laura Delany (115)
Most wickets	Ghulam Fatima (8)	Eimear Richardson (4)
- Player of the series: Sidra Ameen (Pak)

Twenty20 International series
- Results: Ireland won the 3-match series 2–1
Most runs	Nida Dar (115)	Gaby Lewis (144)
Most wickets	Nida Dar (4); Nashra Sandhu (4)	Arlene Kelly (5)
- Player of the series: Gaby Lewis (Ire)

The Ireland women's cricket team toured Pakistan in November 2022 to play three Women's One Day Internationals (WODIs) and three Women's Twenty20 Internationals (WT20Is). All of the matches were played at the Gaddafi Stadium in Lahore. The WODI matches formed part of the 2022–2025 ICC Women's Championship. This was the first time that a senior Ireland national team has played a series in Pakistan. Going into the series, Pakistan held a record of 12 wins from 18 WODI matches against Ireland, and the last time the two sides met in the format was in February 2017.

Pakistan won the first match of the ODI series by 128 runs on the back of a record 221-run opening partnership by Sidra Ameen and Muneeba Ali. The hosts also won the second match, this time by a margin of 9 wickets, with Sidra Ameen scoring an unbeaten 91. Ireland put up an improved performance in the third ODI, but a five-wicket haul by Ghulam Fatima led Pakistan to a 5-wicket victory and a 3–0 series sweep. Sidra Ameen was named player of the series.

Ireland won the first T20I by six wickets. Pakistan levelled the series after winning the second T20I, which had been reduced to 17 overs per side due to rain. Ireland won the decisive third T20I to claim an historic 2–1 series victory. This was the first series win for Ireland women against Pakistan and their first series win away against any Test-playing nation. Gaby Lewis was named player of the series.

== Squads ==
WODIs		WT20Is	
Pakistan	Ireland	Pakistan	Ireland
Bismah Maroof (c); Muneeba Ali (wk); Sidra Ameen; Aiman Anwer; Nida Dar; Ghulam Fatima; Kainat Imtiaz; Sadia Iqbal; Sidra Nawaz; Aliya Riaz; Fatima Sana; Nashra Sandhu; Sadaf Shamas; Omaima Sohail; Umm-e-Hani	Laura Delany (c); Rachel Delaney; Amy Hunter; Shauna Kavanagh; Arlene Kelly; Gaby Lewis; Louise Little; Jane Maguire; Cara Murray; Leah Paul; Orla Prendergast; Celeste Raack; Eimear Richardson; Rebecca Stokell; Mary Waldron (wk)	Bismah Maroof (c); Muneeba Ali (wk); Sidra Ameen; Aiman Anwer; Nida Dar; ~~Tuba Hassan~~; Kainat Imtiaz; Sadia Iqbal; Javeria Khan; Ayesha Naseem; Aliya Riaz; Fatima Sana; Nashra Sandhu; Sadaf Shamas; Omaima Sohail; Ghulam Fatima	Laura Delany (c); Amy Hunter; Shauna Kavanagh; Arlene Kelly; Gaby Lewis; Louise Little; Sophie MacMahon; Jane Maguire; Cara Murray; Leah Paul; Orla Prendergast; Celeste Raack; Eimear Richardson; Rebecca Stokell; Mary Waldron (wk)

Pakistan named Tuba Hassan and Ayesha Naseem as reserves for their ODI squad, along with Ghulam Fatima, Sidra Nawaz and Umm-e-Hani for their T20I squad. Before the start of the series, Tuba Hassan was ruled out of Pakistan's T20I squad due to a finger injury.

== WODI series ==
=== 1st WODI ===
4 November 2022
09:30
Scorecard

Pakistan; 335/3 (50 overs)	v	Ireland; 207 (49.3 overs)
Sidra Ameen 176* (150); Arlene Kelly 2/62 (10 overs)		Laura Delany 69 (92); Nida Dar 3/34 (9.3 overs)

Pakistan won by 128 runs
Gaddafi Stadium, Lahore
Umpires: Faisal Afridi (Pak) and Asif Yaqoob (Pak)
Player of the match: Sidra Ameen (Pak)

- Pakistan won the toss and elected to bat.
- Sadaf Shamas (Pak) made her WODI debut.
- Muneeba Ali (Pak) scored her first century in WODIs.
- Women's Championship points: Pakistan 2, Ireland 0.

=== 2nd WODI ===
6 November 2022
09:30
Scorecard

Ireland; 194 (47.2 overs)	v	Pakistan; 195/1 (32.4 overs)
Mary Waldron 35 (57); Ghulam Fatima 3/32 (10 overs)		Sidra Ameen 91* (93); Eimear Richardson 1/34 (5 overs)

Pakistan won by 9 wickets
Gaddafi Stadium, Lahore
Umpires: Imran Javed (Pak) and Asif Yaqoob (Pak)
Player of the match: Sidra Ameen (Pak)

- Ireland won the toss and elected to bat.
- Women's Championship points: Pakistan 2, Ireland 0.

=== 3rd WODI ===
9 November 2022
09:30
Scorecard

Ireland; 225 (49.5 overs)	v	Pakistan; 226/5 (47.1 overs)
Leah Paul 65 (94); Ghulam Fatima 5/34 (10 overs)		Sadaf Shamas 72 (80); Eimear Richardson 2/45 (10 overs)

Pakistan won by 5 wickets
Gaddafi Stadium, Lahore
Umpires: Faisal Afridi (Pak) and Asif Yaqoob (Pak)
Player of the match: Ghulam Fatima (Pak)

- Ireland won the toss and elected to bat.
- Umm-e-Hani (Pak) made her WODI debut.
- Ghulam Fatima (Pak) took her first five-wicket haul in WODIs.
- Women's Championship points: Pakistan 2, Ireland 0.

== WT20I series ==
=== 1st WT20I ===
12 November 2022
10:00
Scorecard

Pakistan; 135/5 (20 overs)	v	Ireland; 139/4 (18.4 overs)
Nida Dar 61 (43); Orla Prendergast 3/10 (4 overs)		Gaby Lewis 69* (54); Ghulam Fatima 1/26 (4 overs)

Ireland won by 6 wickets
Gaddafi Stadium, Lahore
Umpires: Imran Javed (Pak) and Asif Yaqoob (Pak)
Player of the match: Orla Prendergast (Ire)

- Pakistan won the toss and elected to bat.

=== 2nd WT20I ===
14 November 2022
10:00
Scorecard

Ireland; 118/7 (17 overs)	v	Pakistan; 121/4 (16 overs)
Amy Hunter 36 (39); Nida Dar 2/19 (3 overs)		Javeria Khan 35 (39); Arlene Kelly 1/18 (3 overs)

Pakistan won by 6 wickets
Gaddafi Stadium, Lahore
Umpires: Faisal Afridi (Pak) and Asif Yaqoob (Pak)
Player of the match: Nida Dar (Pak)

- Pakistan won the toss and elected to field.
- The match was reduced to 17 overs per side due to rain.

=== 3rd WT20I ===
16 November 2022
10:00
Scorecard

Ireland; 167/4 (20 overs)	v	Pakistan; 133 (18.5 overs)
Gaby Lewis 71 (46); Nida Dar 1/27 (4 overs)		Javeria Khan 50 (37); Arlene Kenny 3/19 (4 overs)

Ireland won by 34 runs
Gaddafi Stadium, Lahore
Umpires: Faisal Afridi (Pak) and Asif Yaqoob (Pak)
Player of the match: Gaby Lewis (Ire)

- Ireland won the toss and elected to bat.
