= Southend Club Cricket Stadium =

Cricket stadium

Coordinates: 24°47′45″N 67°3′23″E

- Defence Housing Authority Stadium; Defence Cricket Stadium
- Interactive map of Southend Club Cricket Stadium

Ground information
- Location: Karachi, Sindh, Pakistan
- Country: Pakistan
- Establishment: 1992; 34 years ago
- Capacity: 10,000
- Owner: Pakistan Cricket Board

International information
- Only men's Test: 1–6 December 1993: Pakistan v Zimbabwe
- First women's ODI: 24 October 2008: Pakistan v West Indies
- Last women's ODI: 5 June 2022: Pakistan v Sri Lanka
- First women's T20I: 30 September 2015: Pakistan v Bangladesh
- Last women's T20I: 28 May 2022: Pakistan v Sri Lanka
- As of 5 June 2022; Source: Cricinfo

Southend Club Cricket Stadium (previously known as the Defence Cricket Stadium) is a cricket ground in Karachi, Sindh, Pakistan.

== History ==
The ground has hosted only one Test match, that being the 1st Test between Pakistan and Zimbabwe, from 1 December to 6 December 1993. Pakistan won that match by 131 runs, mainly due to Waqar Younis taking 7–91 in the first innings and 6–44 in the second. This was the first match of Younis as captain of Pakistan, standing in for Wasim Akram. Younis became Pakistan's youngest Test captain. The stadium remains an approved venue for Test cricket.

The stadium has hosted 17 other first-class cricket matches from 1990 to 2000, and 16 List A limited overs matches from 1990 to 1999.

Defence Housing Authority Stadium since 2005 has now developed into The Southend Club with various sports & recreational facilities.

In January 2019, the venue was named as the host of the Women's Twenty20 International (WT20I) series between the Pakistan and West Indies women's cricket teams.

Three group stage matches of the 2018 ACC Emerging Teams Asia Cup were held at the stadium, the third of these was abandoned after rain leaked onto the square which led players from the UAE team to criticize the facilities.

In the past, Sri Lanka, England 'A' Team, West Indies under-19 team and Bangladesh men and women teams also played their matches at this Stadium.

In 2022, the ground hosted all six matches (3 WODIs, 3 WT20Is) of the Sri Lanka women's cricket team in Pakistan in 2022.

In 2023, 2024, and 2025, the ground hosted several matches of the Over-40 T20 World Cup.

== List of five-wicket hauls ==
=== Tests ===
Two five wicket hauls in Test matches have been taken at the venue.

No.	Bowler	Date	Team	Opposing team	Inn	Overs	Runs	Wkts	Econ	Result
1	Waqar Younis	1 December 1993	Pakistan	Zimbabwe	2	34.1	91	7	2.66	Won
2	Waqar Younis	1 December 1993	Pakistan	Zimbabwe	4	21.5	44	6	2.01	Won
