= Humera Masroor =

Pakistani cricketer (born 1967)

Personal information
- Full name: Humera Masroor
- Born: 5 August 1967 (age 59); Pakistan
- Batting: Right-handed
- Bowling: Right-arm medium
- Role: Batter

International information
- National side: Pakistan (2006)
- Only ODI (cap 44): 2 January 2006 v India

Domestic team information
- Years: Team
- 2004/05–2007/08: Karachi

Career statistics
Competition	WODI	WLA	WT20
Matches	1	16	7
Runs scored	12	427	18
Batting average	12.00	38.81	18.00
100s/50s	0/0	0/2	0/0
Top score	12	57	14*
Balls bowled	–	156	–
Wickets	–	6	–
Bowling average	–	16.83	–
5 wickets in innings	–	0	–
10 wickets in match	–	0	–
Best bowling	–	2/0	–
Catches/stumpings	0/–	4/–	1/–
- Source: CricketArchive, 5 January 2022

Humera Masroor (born 5 August 1967) is a former Pakistani cricketer who played as a right-handed batter and occasional right-arm medium bowler. She appeared in one One Day International for Pakistan in 2006. She played domestic cricket for Karachi.

Her only WODI appearance came at the age of 38 at the 2005–06 Women's Asia Cup, against India in a losing cause.
