= Najmunnissa Ismail =

Pakistani cricketer

Personal information
- Full name: Najmunnissa Ismail
- Role: Wicket-keeper

International information
- National side: Pakistan (1997)
- ODI debut (cap 6): 28 January 1997 v New Zealand
- Last ODI: 29 January 1997 v New Zealand

Career statistics
Competition	WODI	WLA
Matches	2	3
Runs scored	2	4
Batting average	1.00	1.33
100s/50s	0/0	0/0
Top score	2	2
Catches/stumpings	0/0	0/0
- Source: CricketArchive, 1 February 2023

Najmunnissa Ismail is a Pakistani former cricketer who played as an opening batter and wicket-keeper. She appeared in two One Day Internationals for Pakistan in 1997, both on the side's first ever international tour, of Australia and New Zealand.

Najmunnissa faced the first over of the first ever international match played by a Pakistan women's side.
