= Naila Nazir =

Naila Nazir may refer to:

- Naila Nazir (flight attendant), Pakistan International Airlines flight attendant
- Naila Nazir (cricketer) (born 1989), Pakistani cricketer
