= List of Pakistan women ODI cricketers =

One Day International cricketers

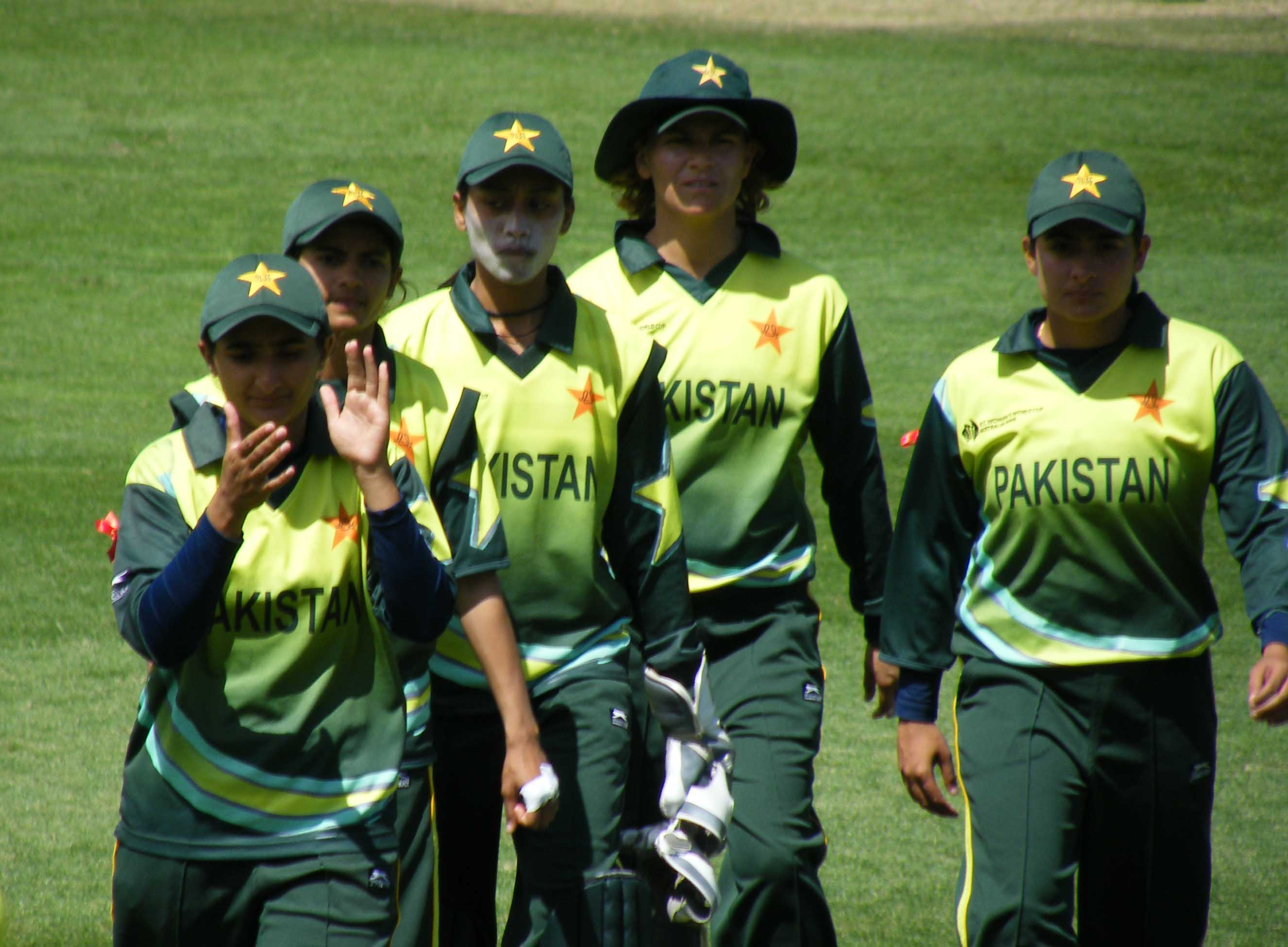
Pakistan Women at Sydney, 2009 ICC Women's World Twenty20

A One Day International (ODI) is an international cricket match between two teams, each having ODI status, as determined by the International Cricket Council. The women's variant of the game is similar to the men's version, with minor modifications to umpiring and pitch requirements. The first women's ODI was played in 1973, between England and Australia. The Pakistan women's team played their first ODI match in January 1997, a match they lost by 10 wickets to New Zealand at the Hagley Oval, Christchurch.

This list includes all players who have played at least one ODI match and is initially arranged in the order of debut appearance. Where more than one player won their first cap in the same match, those players are initially listed alphabetically by last name at the time of debut.

== Key ==
General

- ‡ – Captain
- † – Wicket-keeper
- First – Year of debut
- Last – Year of latest game
- Mat – Number of matches played
- Win% – Winning percentage

Batting

- Runs – Runs scored in career
- HS – Highest score
- 100 – Centuries scored
- 50 – Half-centuries scored
- Avg – Runs scored per dismissal
- * – Batsman remained not out

Bowling

- Balls – Balls bowled in career
- Wkt – Wickets taken in career
- BBI – Best bowling in an innings
- Ave – Average runs per wicket
- 5WI – Five wickets or more in a match

Fielding

- Ca – Catches taken
- St – Stumpings effected

== Players ==
Statistics are correct as of 28 July 2026.

Pakistan women ODI cricketers
Cap	Name	First	Last	Mat	Batting					Bowling					Fielding		Ref(s)
Cap	Name	First	Last	Mat	Runs	HS	100	50	Avg	Balls	Wkt	BBI	Ave	5WI	Ca	St	Ref(s)
1	Abida Khan	1997	1997	2	0	0	0	0	–	–	–	–	–	–	0	0	
2	Aisha Jalil	1997	1997	3	5	5	0	0	1.66	42	1	1/15	63.00	0	0	0	
3	Kiran Baluch	1997	2004	40	570	61	0	1	14.25	1,377	22	2/13	37.81	0	6	0	
4	Maliha Hussain	1997	1997	8	64	16	0	0	8.00	264	0	–	–	0	2	0	
5	Meher Minwalla	1997	2001	11	9	7	0	0	1.50	126	1	1/25	136.00	0	3	0	
6	Najmunnissa Ismail †	1997	1997	2	2	2	0	0	1.00	–	–	–	–	–	0	–	
7	Shabana Kausar	1997	1997	3	19	9	0	0	6.33	114	1	1/84	150.00	0	0	0	
8	Shahnaz Sohail	1997	1997	3	15	10	0	0	5.00	–	–	–	–	–	0	0	
9	Shaiza Khan ‡	1997	2004	40	391	38	0	0	11.17	2,076	63	5/35	23.95	2	7	0	
10	Sharmeen Khan	1997	2000	26	187	48	0	0	7.79	1,114	20	3/42	45.30	0	0	0	
11	Sultana Yousaf	1997	1997	3	6	4	0	0	3.00	72	1	1/46	87.00	0	0	0	
12	Nazli Istiaq †	1997	1997	1	0	0	0	0	0.00	–	–	–	–	–	–	1	
13	Asma Farzand †	1997	1998	8	134	60	0	1	19.14	–	–	–	–	–	1	7	
14	Nazia Nazir	1997	2004	30	342	30	0	0	11.79	681	14	3/35	33.35	0	3	0	
15	Nazia Sadiq	1997	2009	9	78	37	0	0	9.75	–	–	–	–	–	1	0	
16	Ruksana Khan	1997	1997	5	1	1	0	0	0.25	54	2	2/43	27.00	0	1	0	
17	Sadia Butt ‡	1997	2004	24	81	14	0	0	5.06	240	4	2/23	40.25	0	2	0	
18	Shazia Hassan	1997	1998	4	3	2	0	0	1.00	6	0	–	–	0	0	0	
19	Deebah Sherazi	1997	2000	9	35	6	0	0	5.00	56	1	1/12	55.00	0	0	0	
20	Kiran Ahtazaz	1997	1997	2	11	11*	0	0	11.00	–	–	–	–	–	0	0	
21	Mahewish Khan	1998	2001	14	136	69	0	1	10.46	294	4	1/10	48.00	0	1	2	
22	Muqudos Khan	1998	1998	3	1	1	0	0	1.00	–	–	–	–	–	0	0	
23	Khursheed Jabeen	2000	2006	30	117	16	0	0	5.85	1,364	26	3/2	28.88	0	5	0	
24	Sajjida Shah	2000	2009	60	863	52	0	1	15.98	2,724	51	7/4	28.88	1	8	0	
25	Uzma Gondal †	2000	2004	17	18	6	0	0	1.80	–	–	–	–	–	8	9	
26	Zehmarad Afzal	2000	2004	23	332	34	0	0	14.43	174	2	1/22	66.50	0	2	0	
27	Batool Fatima †	2001	2014	83	483	36	0	0	8.62	90	1	1/33	61.00	0	54	46	
28	Huda Ziad	2001	2003	15	4	2*	0	0	0.80	–	–	–	–	–	0	0	
29	Rabia Khan	2001	2002	13	162	26	0	0	12.46	198	5	3/13	22.20	0	9	0	
30	Sabeen Rezvi	2002	2002	6	3	2	0	0	0.75	18	0	–	–	0	0	0	
31	Mariam Butt	2003	2004	12	8	3*	0	0	4.00	–	–	–	–	–	1	0	
32	Maryam Butt	2003	2006	12	56	19*	0	0	8.00	270	4	3/36	41.25	0	1	0	
33	Shabana Latif	2003	2004	4	0	0*	0	0	0.00	–	–	–	–	–	0	0	
34	Mariam Agha	2004	2004	3	5	2	0	0	1.66	6	0	–	–	0	0	0	
35	Mariam Anwar	2004	2004	7	3	1*	0	0	3.00	−	−	-	−	0	1	0	
36	Urooj Mumtaz ‡	2004	2009	38	502	57	0	1	14.34	1,085	36	5/33	24.38	2	13	0	
37	Armaan Khan †	2005	2009	12	114	43*	0	0	10.36	–	–	–	–	–	8	2	
38	Asmavia Iqbal	2005	2017	92	922	49*	0	0	15.89	3,264	70	3/15	36.20	0	23	0	
39	Qanita Jalil	2005	2015	66	449	53	0	1	8.80	2,208	50	5/62	29.24	1	8	0	
40	Sabahat Rasheed	2005	2007	13	10	4*	0	0	5.00	613	12	3/30	33.83	0	3	0	
41	Sana Javed ‡†	2005	2008	20	275	32	0	0	14.47	6	0	–	–	0	4	2	
42	Sana Mir ‡	2005	2019	120	1,630	52	0	3	17.91	5,942	151	5/32	24.27	1	42	0	
43	Tasqeen Qadeer	2005	2008	19	288	45	0	0	16.00	–	–	–	–	–	0	0	
44	Shumaila Mushtaq	2005	2006	3	9	5	0	0	3.00	–	–	–	–	–	1	0	
45	Humera Masroor	2006	2006	1	12	12	0	0	12.00	–	–	–	–	–	0	0	
46	Bismah Maroof ‡	2006	2024	136	3,369	99	0	21	29.55	1,757	44	4/7	26.68	0	40	0	
47	Nain Abidi	2006	2017	87	1,625	101*	1	9	20.83	–	–	–	–	–	27	0	
48	Sumaiya Siddiqi	2007	2015	19	49	24*	0	0	5.44	770	14	2/14	31.92	0	1	0	
49	Sadia Yousuf	2008	2017	59	37	10*	0	0	2.46	2,838	78	5/35	22.78	1	7	0	
50	Almas Akram	2008	2009	12	54	19	0	0	6.00	318	9	3/7	23.55	0	2	0	
51	Javeria Khan ‡	2008	2022	116	2,885	133*	2	15	28.56	860	17	3/22	37.41	0	34	0	
52	Nahida Khan	2009	2022	66	1,410	79	0	8	23.50	36	1	1/6	18.00	0	23	0	
53	Sania Khan	2009	2016	17	27	6	0	0	2.70	605	8	2/37	58.12	0	7	0	
54	Naila Nazir	2009	2009	3	16	6*	0	0	16.00	96	2	2/48	43.00	0	2	0	
55	Sukhan Faiz	2009	2009	2	17	10	0	0	8.50	–	–	–	–	–	1	0	
56	Marina Iqbal	2009	2017	36	437	69	0	1	15.03	448	8	2/12	37.37	0	12	0	
57	Kanwal Naz	2010	2010	3	17	13	0	0	17.00	120	4	3/18	20.50	0	0	0	
58	Nida Dar ‡	2010	2024	112	1,690	87	0	11	18.98	4,723	108	4/10	30.45	0	28	0	
59	Shumaila Qureshi	2010	2010	3	15	15*	0	0	7.50	138	4	2/33	27.75	0	0	0	
60	Mariam Hasan	2010	2011	3	14	8	0	0	4.66	–	–	–	–	–	0	0	
61	Masooma Junaid	2011	2011	10	3	2	0	0	1.50	260	7	2/26	19.85	0	1	0	
62	Sidra Ameen	2011	2026	92	2,810	176*	7	17	35.12	–	–	–	–	–	23	0	
63	Rabiya Shah †	2011	2017	25	127	34	0	0	9.07	–	–	–	–	–	11	3	
64	Kainat Imtiaz	2011	2023	19	134	24	0	0	11.16	510	10	3/49	51.40	0	3	0	
65	Elizebath Khan	2012	2012	1	–	–	–	–	–	18	0	–	–	0	0	0	
66	Iram Javed	2013	2023	22	237	40	0	0	11.85	90	3	2/16	26.66	0	2	0	
67	Javeria Rauf	2013	2014	4	31	16	0	0	15.50	60	1	1/22	55.00	0	0	0	
68	Anam Amin	2014	2022	34	33	11*	0	0	3.30	1,618	48	5/35	20.70	0	5	0	
69	Maham Tariq	2014	2017	8	9	3*	0	0	1.80	246	5	2/63	55.40	0	1	0	
70	Sidra Nawaz ‡†	2014	2025	81	495	47	0	0	10.31	–	–	–	–	–	48	26	
71	Aliya Riaz	2014	2026	86	1,681	81	0	10	25.46	1,020	12	2/24	77.08	0	24	0	
72	Diana Baig	2015	2026	75	356	38*	0	0	9.12	2,991	66	4/30	38.36	0	30	0	
73	Ayesha Zafar	2015	2026	41	779	81	0	5	21.63	175	3	2/13	54.00	0	9	0	
74	Ghulam Fatima	2017	2023	15	11	5*	0	0	3.66	783	27	5/34	22.07	1	3	0	
75	Nashra Sandhu	2017	2026	89	123	11*	0	0	4.73	4,516	121	6/26	27.15	1	36	0	
76	Aiman Anwer	2017	2022	8	15	10	0	0	3.75	264	4	1/13	45.50	0	0	0	
77	Muneeba Ali †	2017	2026	65	1466	107	1	5	24.84	–	–	–	–	–	24	5	
78	Natalia Pervaiz	2018	2026	21	320	73	0	0	22.85	108	1	1/42	102.00	0	3	0	
79	Omaima Sohail	2018	2025	47	799	65	0	3	21.59	832	18	2/7	40.22	0	8	0	
80	Fatima Sana‡	2019	2026	64	855	90*	0	5	19.00	2,650	85	5/39	28.30	1	14	0	
81	Sadia Iqbal	2019	2026	39	48	7	0	0	4.00	1,889	50	4/13	25.34	0	6	0	
82	Syeda Aroob Shah	2019	2026	13	60	40	0	0	15.00	521	14	2/16	27.78	0	0	0	
83	Rameen Shamim	2019	2026	20	87	23	0	0	10.87	813	17	3/18	34.41	0	2	0	
84	Kaynat Hafeez	2019	2019	1	4	4	0	0	4.00	–	–	–	–	–	0	0	
85	Ayesha Naseem	2021	2023	4	33	16	0	0	8.25	–	–	–	–	–	1	0	
86	Sadaf Shamas	2022	2026	26	761	101	1	5	34.28	–	–	–	–	–	7	0	
87	Umm-e-Hani	2022	2026	18	45	11	0	0	3.46	905	20	3/20	35.25	0	7	0	
88	Tuba Hassan	2023	2024	1	49	25	0	0	16.33	204	2	2/48	96.50	0	0	0	
89	Shawaal Zulfiqar	2023	2025	4	15	7	0	0	3.75	–	–	–	–	–	1	0	
90	Waheeda Akhtar	2023	2023	1	–	–	–	–	–	30	1	1/34	34.00	0	0	0	
91	Najiha Alvi †	2023	2026	18	313	56*	0	1	29.11	–	−	–	−	–	7	7	
92	Gull Feroza	2025	2026	10	422	106*	2	2	46.88	–	−	–	−	–	3	0	
93	Eyman Fatima	2025	2025	3	2	2*	0	0	2.00	–	−	–	−	–	1	0	
94	Tasmia Rubab	2026	2026	6	7	6	0	0	7.00	214	8	3/49	22.87	0	0	0	
95	Momina Riasat	2026	2026	3	–	–	–	–	–	156	4	2/39	29.00	0	0	0	

== ODI captains ==
No.	Name	First	Last	Mat	Won	Lost	Tied	No result	Win%
1	Shaiza Khan	1997	2004	39	7	32	0	0	17.94
2	Sadia Butt	2003	2003	1	1	0	0	0	100.00
3	Sana Javed	2005	2006	4	0	4	0	0	0.00
4	Urooj Mumtaz	2006	2009	26	4	21	0	1	16.00
5	Sana Mir	2009	2017	72	26	45	0	1	36.61
6	Bismah Maroof	2013	2023	34	16	16	1	1	50.00
7	Javeria Khan	2018	2021	17	3	14	0	0	17.64
8	Sidra Nawaz	2021	2021	1	0	1	0	0	0.00
9	Nida Dar	2023	2024	13	2	9	1	1	20.83
10	Fatima Sana	2023	2026	25	10	11	1	0	47.72
11	Muneeba Ali	2026	2026	1	1	0	0	0	100.00
