= Aisha Jalil =

Pakistani cricketer

Personal information
- Full name: Aisha Jalil
- Role: All-rounder

International information
- National side: Pakistan (1997)
- ODI debut (cap 2): 28 January 1997 v New Zealand
- Last ODI: 7 February 1997 v Australia

Career statistics
| Competition | WODI |
|---|---|
| Matches | 3 |
| Runs scored | 5 |
| Batting average | 1.66 |
| 100s/50s | 0/0 |
| Top score | 5 |
| Balls bowled | 42 |
| Wickets | 1 |
| Bowling average | 63.00 |
| 5 wickets in innings | 0 |
| 10 wickets in match | 0 |
| Best bowling | 1/15 |
| Catches/stumpings | 0/– |
- Source: CricketArchive, 9 January 2022

Aisha Jalil is a Pakistani former cricketer who played as an all-rounder. She appeared in three One Day Internationals for Pakistan in 1997, all on the side's tour of Australia and New Zealand. She made her WODI debut against New Zealand on 28 January 1997.

Following her career, Aisha Jalil worked in sport development, and then as an Assistant Manager of Women's Cricket at the PCB. In 2018, she was named in the Muslim Women in Sports Powerlist as one of the 30 most influential Muslim women in sport in the world, for her work in youth development.
