= Chamari =

Chamari may be,

- anything to do with the Chamar caste of India, such as the alleged Chamari language
- Chamari Atapattu, Sri Lankan cricketer
- Chamari Polgampola, Sri Lankan cricketer
