= Kiran Ahtazaz =

Pakistani cricketer (born 1981)

Personal information
- Full name: Kiran Ahtazaz
- Born: 1981 (age 44–45); Islamabad, Pakistan
- Batting: Right-handed
- Role: Batter

International information
- National side: Pakistan (1997)
- ODI debut (cap 20): 14 December 1997 v Australia
- Last ODI: 16 December 1997 v South Africa

Domestic team information
- Years: Team
- 2005/06: Rawalpindi

Career statistics
Competition	WODI	WLA
Matches	2	4
Runs scored	11	23
Batting average	11.00	7.66
100s/50s	0/0	0/0
Top score	11*	12
Catches/stumpings	0/–	2/–
- Source: CricketArchive, 7 January 2022

Kiran Ahtazaz (born 1981) is a Pakistani former cricketer who played as a right-handed batter. She appeared in two One Day Internationals (ODIs) for Pakistan, both at the 1997 Women's Cricket World Cup, making her debut against Australia on 14 December 1997. Her only other ODI, against South Africa, came two days later.

She played domestic cricket for Rawalpindi.
