= Shahnaz Sohail =

Pakistani cricketer

Personal information
- Full name: Shahnaz Sohail
- Born: Rawalpindi, Pakistan
- Role: Batter

International information
- National side: Pakistan
- ODI debut (cap 8): 28 January 1997 v New Zealand
- Last ODI: 7 February 1997 v Australia

Career statistics
Competition	WODI	WLA
Matches	3	5
Runs scored	15	32
Batting average	5.00	6.40
100s/50s	0/0	0/0
Top score	10	12
Catches/stumpings	0/–	0/–
- Source: CricketArchive, 8 January 2022

Shahnaz Sohail is a Pakistani former cricketer who played as a batter. She appeared in three women's One Day Internationals (WODIs) for Pakistan, all on their tour of Australia and New Zealand in 1997. She made her WODI debut against New Zealand on 28 January 1997. Following her playing career, she became the manager of the Pakistan women's team.
