= Shabana Kausar =

Pakistani cricketer

Personal information
- Full name: Shabana Kausar
- Role: Bowler

International information
- National side: Pakistan
- ODI debut (cap 7): 28 January 1997 v New Zealand
- Last ODI: 7 February 1997 v Australia

Career statistics
| Competition | WODI | WLA |
|---|---|---|
| Matches | 3 | 5 |
| Runs scored | 19 | 24 |
| Batting average | 6.33 | 4.80 |
| 100s/50s | 0/0 | 0/0 |
| Top score | 9 | 9 |
| Balls bowled | 114 | 174 |
| Wickets | 1 | 1 |
| Bowling average | 150.00 | 231.00 |
| 5 wickets in innings | 0 | 0 |
| 10 wickets in match | 0 | 0 |
| Best bowling | 1/84 | 1/84 |
| Catches/stumpings | 1/– | 1/– |
- Source: CricketArchive, 1 February 2023

Shabana Kausar is a Pakistani former cricketer who played as a bowler. She appeared in three One Day Internationals for Pakistan, all on their tour of Australia and New Zealand in 1997, the side's first ever international series. She made her WODI debut against New Zealand on 28 January 1997.

Kausar took the first ever wicket by a Pakistani woman international, bowling Debbie Hockley in the second ODI of the series.
