= Nazli Istiaq =

Pakistani cricketer

Personal information
- Full name: Nazli Istiaq
- Role: Wicket-keeper

International information
- National side: Pakistan
- Only ODI (cap 12): 7 February 1997 v Australia

Career statistics
Competition	WODI	WLA
Matches	1	3
Runs scored	0	–
Batting average	0.00	–
100s/50s	0/0	0/0
Top score	0	0
Catches/stumpings	0/1	0/2
- Source: CricketArchive, 28 March 2024

Nazli Istiaq is a Pakistani former cricketer who played as a wicket-keeper. She appeared in only one One Day Internationals for Pakistan, all on their tour of Australia and New Zealand in 1997. She made her Women's One Day International (WODI) debut against Australia on 7 February 1997.
