= Sadaf Shamas =

Pakistani cricketer

Personal information
- Born: 30 December 1998 (age 27); Lahore, Punjab, Pakistan
- Batting: Right-handed
- Bowling: Right-arm medium
- Role: Batter

International information
- National side: Pakistan (2022–present)
- ODI debut (cap 86): 4 November 2022 v Ireland
- Last ODI: 29 May 2024 v England
- T20I debut (cap 51): 24 January 2023 v Australia
- Last T20I: 14 October 2024 v New Zealand
- T20I shirt no.: 18

Domestic team information
- Years: Team
- 2017: Lahore
- 2018/19: Higher Education Commission
- 2024: Multan

Career statistics
Competition	WODI	WT20I
Matches	15	12
Runs scored	262	61
Batting average	20.15	6.10
100s/50s	0/1	0/0
Top score	72	35
Balls bowled	–	6
Wickets	–	0
Bowling average	–	–
5 wickets in innings	–	0
10 wickets in match	–	0
Best bowling	–	–
Catches/stumpings	6/–	3/–
- Source: Cricinfo, 15 October 2024

Sadaf Shamas (born 30 December 1998) is a Pakistani cricketer who plays as a right-handed batter. She has also played domestic cricket for Lahore, Higher Education Commission and Multan.

== International career ==
In May 2022, she was named in Women's One Day International (WODI) squads for Sri Lanka's tour of Pakistan. In September 2022, she was named in Pakistan's squad for the Asia Cup.

Shamas made her WODI debut on 4 November 2022 against Ireland at Gaddafi Stadium, Lahore. She made her WT20I debut on 24 January 2023 against Australia at North Sydney Oval, Sydney.

In January 2023, Shamas was added to Pakistan's squad for the 2023 ICC Women's T20 World Cup. She replaced Diana Baig, who was ruled out of the squad due to a fractured finger. In July 2023, she was selected in Pakistan's 2023 Asian Games squad.

She was named in the Pakistan squad for the 2024 ICC Women's T20 World Cup.
