= Sultana Yousaf =

Pakistani cricketer

Personal information
- Full name: Sultana Yousaf
- Role: All-rounder

International information
- National side: Pakistan
- ODI debut (cap 11): 28 January 1997 v New Zealand
- Last ODI: 7 February 1997 v Australia

Career statistics
Competition	WODI
Matches	3
Runs scored	6
Batting average	3.00
100s/50s	0/0
Top score	4
Balls bowled	72
Wickets	1
Bowling average	87.00
5 wickets in innings	0
10 wickets in match	0
Best bowling	1/46
Catches/stumpings	0/–
- Source: Cricinfo, 29 March 2024

Sultana Yousaf is a Pakistani former cricketer who played as an all-rounder. She appeared in three Women's One Day International (WODI) for Pakistan in 1997, all on the side's tour of Australia and New Zealand. She made her WODI debut against New Zealand on 28 January 1997.
