= Sabahat Rasheed =

Pakistani cricketer (born 1982)

Personal information
- Full name: Sabahat Rasheed
- Born: 11 December 1982 (age 43); Lahore, Pakistan
- Batting: Right-handed
- Bowling: Right-arm off break
- Role: Bowler

International information
- National side: Pakistan (2005–2007)
- ODI debut (cap 39): 28 December 2005 v Sri Lanka
- Last ODI: 28 January 2007 v South Africa

Domestic team information
- Years: Team
- 2005/06–2012/13: Lahore
- 2011/12: Khyber Pakhtunkhwa
- 2012/13: Balochistan
- 2014: Saif Sports Saga

Career statistics
Competition	WODI	WLA	WT20
Matches	13	54	17
Runs scored	10	316	9
Batting average	5.00	15.04	1.50
100s/50s	0/0	0/0	0/0
Top score	4*	42	6*
Balls bowled	613	2,125	324
Wickets	12	79	14
Bowling average	33.83	16.60	22.28
5 wickets in innings	0	3	0
10 wickets in match	0	0	0
Best bowling	2/30	7/42	2/12
Catches/stumpings	3/–	20/–	3/–
- Source: CricketArchive, 2 January 2022

Sabahat Rasheed (born 11 December 1982) is a Pakistani former cricketer who played as a right-arm off break bowler. She appeared in 13 One Day Internationals for Pakistan from 2005 to 2007. She played domestic cricket for Lahore, Khyber Pakhtunkhwa, Balochistan and Saif Sports Saga.

Sabahat made her ODI debut in the 2005–06 Women's Asia Cup which was held in Pakistan. She also represented the national women's cricket team in the 2006 Women's Asia Cup. Sabahat was also a member of the Pakistan team which emerged as runners-up to South Africa in the 2008 Women's Cricket World Cup Qualifier.
