= Abida Khan =

Pakistani cricketer (born 1977)

Personal information
- Full name: Abida Khan Jalil
- Role: All-rounder

International information
- National side: Pakistan
- ODI debut (cap 1): 28 January 1997 v New Zealand
- Last ODI: 29 January 1997 v New Zealand

Career statistics
Competition	WODI	WLA
Matches	2	3
Runs scored	0	0
Batting average	0.00	0.00
100s/50s	0/0	0/0
Top score	0	0
Balls bowled	–	30
Wickets	–	0
Bowling average	–	–
5 wickets in innings	–	0
10 wickets in match	–	0
Best bowling	–	–
Catches/stumpings	0/–	0/–
- Source: CricketArchive, 9 January 2022

Abida Khan (born 2 March 1977) is a Pakistani former cricketer who played as an all-rounder. Abida made her debut in international cricket in a One Day International (ODI) against Denmark on 10 December 1997. Her second and final match for Pakistan was also an ODI against New Zealand.
