= Minwalla =

Minwalla is an Indian (Parsi) surname. Notable people with the surname include:

- Darius Minwalla, drummer of The Posies
- Meher Minwalla (born 1977), Pakistani cricketer
- Shiraz Minwalla (born 1972), Indian physicist
