= Sharmeen Khan =

Pakistani cricketer (1972–2018)

Personal information
- Full name: Sharmeen Said Khan
- Born: 1 April 1972; Karachi, Pakistan
- Died: 13 December 2018 (aged 46); Lahore, Pakistan
- Batting: Right-handed
- Bowling: Right-arm medium-fast
- Role: All-rounder
- Relatives: Shaiza Khan (sister)

International information
- National side: Pakistan (1997–2002)
- Test debut (cap 8): 17 April 1998 v Sri Lanka
- Last Test: 30 July 2000 v Ireland
- ODI debut (cap 10): 28 January 1997 v New Zealand
- Last ODI: 30 January 2002 v Sri Lanka

Domestic team information
- Years: Team
- 2005/06–2006/07: Lahore

Career statistics
Competition	WTest	WODI	WLA
Matches	2	26	35
Runs scored	29	187	220
Batting average	7.25	7.79	7.33
100s/50s	0/0	0/0	0/0
Top score	19	48	48
Balls bowled	211	1,114	1,506
Wickets	5	20	32
Bowling average	25.80	45.30	36.62
5 wickets in innings	0	0	0
10 wickets in match	0	0	0
Best bowling	3/23	3/42	3/28
Catches/stumpings	1/–	0/–	2/–
- Source: CricketArchive, 13 December 2021

Sharmeen Said Khan (1 April 1972 – 13 December 2018) was a Pakistani cricketer who played as a right-handed batter and right-arm medium-fast bowler. She along with her sister, Shaiza, are considered pioneers of women's cricket in Pakistan.

Sharmeen appeared in two Test matches and 26 One Day Internationals for Pakistan between 1997 and 2002. She played domestic cricket for Lahore.

== Early life ==
Sharmeen Khan was born to a wealthy carpet merchant in Karachi. She and her sister were appointed full members of the Marylebone Cricket Club in 2003. She attended Concord College, Acton Burnell and University of Leeds.

== Career ==
After studying in England and watching the 1993 World Cup final, the siblings were inspired to create their own team. They also played a match for Middlesex in 1991, against East Anglia. In 1997, they secured the right to have a Pakistani women's team, with the side playing its first matches that year, touring Australia and New Zealand before playing at the 1997 World Cup.

Sharmeen Khan died on 13 December 2018 after a struggle with pneumonia.
