= Cherie Bambury =

Australian cricketer (born 1976)

Personal information
- Full name: Cherie Anne Bambury
- Born: 24 July 1976 (age 50); Australia
- Batting: Left-handed
- Bowling: Right-arm fast–medium

International information
- National side: Australia
- ODI debut (cap 80): 7 February 1997 v Pakistan
- Last ODI: 23 December 2000 v New Zealand

Domestic team information
- Years: Team
- 1993/94–2009/10: Western Australia

Career statistics
Competition	ODI	FC	LA
Matches	15	4	71
Runs scored	227	130	1,357
Batting average	22.70	26.00	23.00
100s/50s	0/2	0/0	0/10
Top score	66	35	91*
Balls bowled	18	318	1,368
Wickets	0	3	28
Bowling average	–	35.33	29.64
5 wickets in innings	–	0	0
10 wickets in match	–	0	0
Best bowling	–	1/8	4/23
Catches/stumpings	6/–	2/–	29/–
- Source: CricInfo, 7 August 2025

Cherie Anne Bambury (born 24 July 1976) is a former Australian cricket player. She played in the Women's National Cricket League for the Western Fury between 1996 and 2010. Bambury played fifteen One Day Internationals for the Australia national women's cricket team. Her final WODI appearance was in the final of the 2000 Women's Cricket World Cup.
