= Nirosha Kumari =

Sri Lankan cricketer (born 1984)

Personal information
- Full name: Batugoda Rankoth Gedara Nirosha Kumari
- Born: 9 May 1984 (age 42); Kandy, Sri Lanka

International information
- National side: Sri Lanka

Career statistics
Competition	WODI
Matches	2
Runs scored	3
Batting average	1.50
100s/50s	0/0
Top score	2
Balls bowled	66
Wickets	0
Bowling average	–
5 wickets in innings	–
10 wickets in match	–
Best bowling	–
Catches/stumpings	1/–
- Source: Cricinfo, 12 December 2017

Batugoda Rankoth Gedara Nirosha Kumari (born 9 May 1984), known as Nirosha Kumari, is a former Sri Lankan cricketer. Kumai made her Women's One Day International (WODI) debut at the 2006 Women's Asia Cup. She played for Sri Lanka in two WODIs.
