= Rawalpindi women's cricket team =

Pakistani women's cricket team

Rawalpindi Women
Personnel
- Captain: Nida Nasir

Team information
- Founded: Unknown First recorded match: 2005

History
- NWCC wins: 0

The Rawalpindi women's cricket team is the women's representative cricket team for Rawalpindi in domestic cricket in Pakistan. They competed in the National Women's Cricket Championship between 2004–05 and 2017.

== History ==
Rawalpindi joined the National Women's Cricket Championship for its inaugural season in 2004–05, losing to eventual winners Karachi in the initial knock-out stage. The side went on to compete in every edition of the National Women's Cricket Championship until it ended in 2017, but never made it out of the initial group stage. Their best performance came in the 2011–12 season, when they won two matches of their four matches in Zone B.

== Players ==
=== Notable players ===
The players who played for Rawalpindi and for Pakistan internationally are listed below, in order of first international appearance (given in brackets):

- (Pakistan) Kiran Ahtazaz (1997)
- (Pakistan) Naila Nazir (2009)
- (Pakistan) Aliya Riaz (2014)

== Seasons ==
=== National Women's Cricket Championship ===
Season	Division	League standings								Notes
Season	Division	P	W	L	T	A/C	Pts	NRR	Pos	Notes
2004–05	N/A	Eliminated in knock-out round								
2005–06	Rawalpindi Zone	2	0	2	0	0	0	–3.267	3rd	
2006–07	Group C	3	0	2	0	1	2	–2.629	4th	
2007–08	Group A	3	0	3	0	0	0	–4.645	4th	
2009–10	Zone C	3	0	3	0	0	0	–4.696	4th	
2010–11	Zone C	3	1	2	0	0	4	–0.681	3rd	
2011–12	Zone B	4	2	2	0	0	8	–0.556	3rd	
2012–13	Pool A	6	1	5	0	0	2	–2.156	6th	
2014	Pool A	3	0	3	0	0	0	–2.047	4th	
2015	Qualifying Group I	2	1	1	0	0	2	–0.179	2nd	
2016	Pool A	3	0	3	0	0	0	–5.134	5th	
2017	Pool A	3	2	1	0	0	4	+1.747	2nd	

== See also ==
- Rawalpindi cricket team
