= Sukhan Faiz =

Pakistani cricketer (born 1988)

Personal information
- Full name: Sukhan Faiz
- Born: 9 March 1988 (age 38); Multan, Pakistan
- Batting: Right-handed
- Role: Batter

International information
- National side: Pakistan (2009)
- ODI debut (cap 54): 9 March 2009 v Sri Lanka
- Last ODI: 12 March 2009 v England

Domestic team information
- Years: Team
- 2004/05–2009/10: Multan
- 2010/11: Pakistan Universities
- 2011/12: Khyber Pakhtunkhwa
- 2011/12: Higher Education Commission
- 2012/13–2017: Multan
- 2012/13: Balochistan

Career statistics
Competition	WODI	WLA	WT20
Matches	2	53	14
Runs scored	17	1,001	178
Batting average	8.50	21.76	14.83
100s/50s	0/0	0/6	0/1
Top score	10	82*	53*
Balls bowled	–	599	18
Wickets	–	13	1
Bowling average	–	41.69	22.00
5 wickets in innings	–	0	0
10 wickets in match	–	0	0
Best bowling	–	2/35	1/10
Catches/stumpings	1/–	22/1	5/–
- Source: CricketArchive, 2 January 2022

Sukhan Faiz (Sindhi: سُکھاں فیض) (born 9 March 1988) is a Pakistani former cricketer who played primarily as a right-handed batter. Making her One Day International (ODI) debut against Sri Lanka Women on March 9, 2009, she appeared in two ODIs for Pakistan, both in March 2009 at the 2009 Women's Cricket World Cup. She played domestic cricket for Multan, Pakistan Universities, Khyber Pakhtunkhwa, Higher Education Commission and Balochistan.
