= Maliha Hussain =

Pakistani cricketer (born 1974)

Personal information
- Full name: Maliha Hussain
- Born: 1974 (age 51–52); Karachi, Pakistan
- Bowling: Right-arm medium
- Role: All-rounder

International information
- National side: Pakistan (1997)
- ODI debut (cap 4): 28 January 1997 v New Zealand
- Last ODI: 18 December 1997 v Ireland

Career statistics
Competition	WODI
Matches	8
Runs scored	64
Batting average	8.00
100s/50s	0/0
Top score	16
Balls bowled	264
Wickets	0
Bowling average	–
5 wickets in innings	0
10 wickets in match	0
Best bowling	–
Catches/stumpings	2/–
- Source: CricketArchive, 9 January 2022

Maliha Hussain (born 1974) is a Pakistani former cricketer who played as an all-rounder.

Maliha made her international cricket debut in a One Day International (ODI) against New Zealand at Christchurch on 28 January 1997.

She appeared in eight ODIs for Pakistan in 1997, including playing at the 1997 World Cup.
