= Kiran Baluch =

Pakistani cricketer

Personal information
- Full name: Kiran Maqsood Baluch
- Born: 23 February 1978 (age 48); Jacobabad, Pakistan
- Batting: Right-handed
- Bowling: Right-arm off break
- Role: All-rounder

International information
- National side: Pakistan (1997–2004)
- Test debut (cap 1): 17 April 1998 v Sri Lanka
- Last Test: 15 March 2004 v West Indies
- ODI debut (cap 3): 28 January 1997 v New Zealand
- Last ODI: 2 April 2004 v West Indies

Domestic team information
- Years: Team
- 2005/06: Karachi

Career statistics
Competition	WTest	WODI	WLA
Matches	3	40	46
Runs scored	360	570	933
Batting average	60.00	14.25	21.20
100s/50s	1/1	0/1	2/2
Top score	242	61	162*
Balls bowled	300	1,377	1,479
Wickets	2	22	22
Bowling average	76.50	37.81	41.36
5 wickets in innings	0	0	0
10 wickets in match	0	0	0
Best bowling	2/41	2/13	2/13
Catches/stumpings	1/–	6/–	6/–
- Source: CricketArchive, 14 December 2021

Kiran Maqsood Baluch (born 23 February 1978) is a Pakistani former cricketer who played as an all-rounder, batting right-handed and bowling right-arm off break. She appeared in three Test matches and 40 One Day Internationals for Pakistan. She holds the record for the highest score in women's Test cricket, scoring 242 against the visiting West Indies in 2004. She played domestic cricket for Karachi.

== Early life and introduction to cricket ==
Born as the eldest child of her family, Baluch started playing cricket at a young age. As a child, she also played basketball and badminton since her school did not have facilities for women to play cricket. Her father was a professional cricketer who played in tournaments like the Quaid-e-Azam Trophy and for teams like Pakistan Television and Pakistan International Airlines. He used to teach her bowling, and Baluch played regularly with her father and her youngest brother.

== Entry into the national team ==
In October 1996, the Pakistan Women's Cricket Control Association headed by Shaiza Khan was on look out for players on a trial basis to build a team that was set to tour Australia and New Zealand. Baluch was approached by Khan to be a part of the team. Until 1997, Baluch did not play any competitive cricket. Her first major tournament was the Fatima Jinnah Trophy, an annual domestic tournament in Pakistan. Following that, she was selected in the national side that toured Australia and New Zealand in 1997 to play three ODIs and a few domestic games. Baluch represented Pakistan women's cricket team in their first ever ODI match, played against New Zealand in January 1997. Pakistan was bowled out for 56 runs, with Baluch being the top-scorer with 19 runs. Pakistan lost the match by 10 wickets. In the next game she was out for a duck and her performance did not improve in the subsequent series' in Australia and India. During the season, in one of the matches played against Denmark in India, she picked up 2 wickets for 13 runs, which remain her best ODI bowling figures.

Baluch was then picked for the Test squad that toured Sri Lanka in 1998. The Pakistan women's cricket team played its first ever Test match in the series. Playing in her first Test match, Baluch made top-scored for her team with 76 in the first innings. However, the hosts won the match by 309 runs. In her next match against Ireland in 2000 she was out for a duck. The team then played against the West Indies in a home series in 2004. In the only Test match of the series, she made 242 runs in the first innings. The total is the highest individual score by a player in Women's Test cricket as of 2021. (Note: Baluch surpassed the previous record of 214 made by India's Mithali Raj.) She also achieved her career-best Test bowling performance in the third innings of the match when she took 2 wickets for 41 runs.
