= Naila Nazir (cricketer) =

Pakistani cricketer (born 1989)

Personal information
- Full name: Naila Nazir
- Born: 30 March 1989 (age 37); Abbottabad, Pakistan
- Batting: Right-handed
- Bowling: Right-arm leg break
- Role: Bowler

International information
- National side: Pakistan (2009–2015)
- ODI debut (cap 53): 17 February 2009 v Sri Lanka
- Last ODI: 21 March 2009 v West Indies
- Only T20I (cap 33): 16 January 2015 v Sri Lanka

Domestic team information
- Years: Team
- 2006/07–2010/11: Islamabad
- 2011/12–2012/13: Federal Capital
- 2011/12–2014: Rawalpindi
- 2014–2015: Omar Associates
- 2017: Rawalpindi

Career statistics
Competition	WODI	WT20I	WLA	WT20
Matches	3	1	50	25
Runs scored	16	–	532	54
Batting average	2.66	–	16.12	6.75
100s/50s	0/0	–	0/2	0/0
Top score	6*	–	65*	23
Balls bowled	96	18	2,039	399
Wickets	2	0	67	24
Bowling average	43.00	–	19.50	17.50
5 wickets in innings	0	0	1	0
10 wickets in match	0	0	0	0
Best bowling	2/48	–	5/34	4/19
Catches/stumpings	2/–	0/–	17/–	8/–
- Source: CricketArchive, 3 January 2022

Naila Nazir (born 30 March 1989) is a Pakistani former cricketer who played as a right-arm leg break bowler. She appeared in three One Day Internationals (ODI) and one Twenty20 International (T20I) for Pakistan between 2009 and 2015. She played domestic cricket for Islamabad, Federal Capital, Rawalpindi and Omar Associates.

== Career ==
Nazir made her One Day International debut on 17 February 2009, in a loss against Sri Lanka. She scored 6* and bowled 4 overs for 20 runs. She made her T20I debut six years later, in a comfortable victory against the same opposition at Sharjah on January 16, 2015.
