= Janakanthy Mala =

Sri Lankan international cricketer

Personal information
- Full name: Augustnuge Don Janakanthymala
- Born: 30 August 1968 (age 58); Colombo, Sri Lanka
- Batting: Right-handed
- Bowling: Right-arm off-spin
- Role: Bowler

International information
- National side: Sri Lanka (2000–2008)
- ODI debut (cap 20): 1 December 2000 v Australia
- Last ODI: 11 May 2008 v India
- Source: CricketArchive, 20 August 2016

Janakanthy Mala (born 30 August 1968) is a former Sri Lankan international cricketer who represented the Sri Lankan national team between 2000 and 2008. She played as a right-arm off-spin bowler.

Mala made her international debut at the 2000 Women's World Cup in New Zealand. She played in six out of her team's seven matches, but failed to take a wicket. She was aged 32 at the time, the oldest member of the Sri Lankan squad. After the World Cup, Mala next played at the One Day International (ODI) level in January 2002, when Pakistan toured. In her first match of the series, which was the fifth overall, she took 4/3 from three overs, which were to remain the best figures of her career. At the 2005 World Cup in South Africa, Mala was again the oldest member of Sri Lanka's squad, and the sixth-oldest player overall. She appeared in all six of her team's matches, but took only two wickets, both coming in the same game, against South Africa. Mala made her last international appearances at the 2008 Women's Asia Cup, both of which were against India. She was 39 at the time of her last ODI, making her the oldest Sri Lankan woman to play at that level.
