= Sania Khan =

Pakistani cricketer (born 1985)

Personal information
- Full name: Sania Iqbal Khan
- Born: 23 March 1985 (age 41); Multan, Pakistan
- Batting: Right-handed
- Bowling: Right-arm medium
- Role: All-rounder

International information
- National side: Pakistan (2009–2016)
- ODI debut (cap 52): 12 February 2009 v Sri Lanka
- Last ODI: 20 June 2016 v England
- T20I debut (cap 15): 8 May 2010 v India
- Last T20I: 3 July 2016 v England

Domestic team information
- Years: Team
- 2004/05–2009/10: Multan
- 2006/07: Karachi
- 2011/12–2017: Zarai Taraqiati Bank Limited
- 2014: Multan

Career statistics
Competition	WODI	WT20I	WLA	WT20
Matches	17	25	66	59
Runs scored	27	63	757	130
Batting average	2.70	7.87	24.41	6.50
100s/50s	0/0	0/0	2/1	0/0
Top score	6	15	155*	15
Balls bowled	605	425	2,291	934
Wickets	8	23	61	46
Bowling average	58.12	19.60	24.36	21.34
5 wickets in innings	0	0	0	0
10 wickets in match	0	0	0	0
Best bowling	2/37	3/15	4/12	4/28
Catches/stumpings	8/–	3/–	21/–	10/–
Medal record
Representing Pakistan
Women's Cricket
Asian Games
Gold medal – first place	2010 Guangzhou	Team
Gold medal – first place	2014 Incheon	Team
- Source: CricketArchive, 4 January 2022

Sania Iqbal Khan (Urdu: سانیہ اقبال خان; born 23 March 1985) is a Pakistani former cricketer who played as a right-arm medium bowler and right-handed batter. She appeared in 17 One Day Internationals and 25 Twenty20 Internationals for Pakistan between 2009 and 2016, including representing her country at the 2009 World Cup. She also played at two T20 World Cups, and captained Pakistan in two WT20Is in 2010. She played domestic cricket for Multan, Karachi and Zarai Taraqiati Bank Limited.

In 2010, Khan was part of the Pakistan team that won the Asian women's cricket gold medal at the 2010 Asian Games, held in China.
