= Devendra Sharma (umpire) =

Indian cricket umpire (born 1953)

Personal information
- Born: 20 March 1953 (age 73); Delhi, India

Umpiring information
- ODIs umpired: 5 (1997–2002)
- Source: ESPNcricinfo, 30 May 2014

Devendra Sharma (born 20 March 1953) is a former Indian cricket umpire. He stood in five ODI games between 1997 and 2002. In 2011 he was removed from umpiring by the ICC following unprofessional conduct, which reportedly included supplying information about the pitch and conditions before a game.

== See also ==
- List of One Day International cricket umpires
