= Multan women's cricket team =

Pakistani women's cricket team

Multan Women
Personnel
- Captain: Sukhan Faiz

Team information
- Founded: Unknown First recorded match: 2005

History
- NWCC wins: 0

The Multan women's cricket team is the women's representative cricket team for Multan, a district of Punjab province in Pakistan. They competed in the National Women's Cricket Championship between 2004–05 and 2017.

== History ==
Multan joined the National Women's Cricket Championship for its inaugural season in 2004–05, beating Faisalabad in the initial knock-out stage before finishing fourth in the final Super League. The side went on to compete in every edition of the National Women's Cricket Championship until it ended in 2017, but did not better their best finish from their first season. They finished second in their group five times in a row between 2006–07 and 2011–12, as well as in 2014.

== Players ==
=== Notable players ===
The players who have played for Multan and for Pakistan internationally are listed below, in order of first international appearance (given in brackets):

- (Pakistan) Asmavia Iqbal (2005)
- (Pakistan) Sania Khan (2009)
- (Pakistan) Sukhan Faiz (2009)
- (Pakistan) Gull Feroza (2022)
- (Pakistan) Tasmia Rubab (2024)

== Seasons ==
=== National Women's Cricket Championship ===
Season	Division	League standings								Notes
Season	Division	P	W	L	T	A/C	Pts	NRR	Pos	Notes
2004–05	Super League	3	0	3	0	0	0	–1.890	4th	
2005–06	Lahore Zone	3	1	2	0	0	4	–1.526	3rd	
2006–07	Group A	3	1	2	0	0	4	+0.153	2nd	
2007–08	Group C	3	2	1	0	0	8	+1.110	2nd	
2009–10	Zone B	4	3	1	0	0	12	+2.242	2nd	
2010–11	Zone C	3	1	1	0	1	6	–1.532	2nd	
2011–12	Zone A	4	2	1	1	0	10	+1.440	2nd	
2012–13	Pool A	6	2	4	0	0	4	–1.107	5th	
2014	Pool B	3	2	1	0	0	4	+0.832	2nd	
2015	Super League	5	0	5	0	0	0	–3.491	6th	
2016	Pool B	3	1	1	0	1	3	–3.010	3rd	
2017	Pool C	3	2	1	0	0	4	+0.128	3rd	

== Honours ==
- National Women's Cricket Championship:
  - Winners (0):
  - Best finish: 4th (2004–05)

== See also ==
- Multan cricket team
