= Rajeshwari Goyal =

Indian cricketer (born 1981)

Personal information
- Full name: Rajeshwari Rameshwar Goyal
- Born: 15 December 1981 (age 44); Orai, Uttar Pradesh, India
- Batting: Right-handed
- Bowling: Right-arm off-break

International information
- National side: India
- ODI debut (cap 84): 15 December 2006 v Sri Lanka
- Last ODI: 28 February 2007 v England

Career statistics
| Competition | WODI |
|---|---|
| Matches | 5 |
| Runs scored | 2 |
| Batting average | 2.00 |
| 100s/50s | 0/0 |
| Top score | 2* |
| Balls bowled | 199 |
| Wickets | 3 |
| Bowling average | 24.00 |
| 5 wickets in innings | 0 |
| 10 wickets in match | 0 |
| Best bowling | 2/12 |
| Catches/stumpings | 0/- |
- Source: CricketArchive, 5 May 2020

Rajeshwari Rameshwar Goyal (born 15 December 1981) is a One Day International cricketer who represents India. She is a right hand batsman and bowls right-arm off-breaks. She has played five ODIs, taking three wickets.
