= Sana Javed (cricketer) =

Pakistani cricketer (born 1983)

Personal information
- Full name: Sana Javed
- Born: 27 March 1983 (age 43); Toba Tek Singh, Punjab, Pakistan
- Batting: Right-handed
- Bowling: Right-arm medium-fast
- Role: Wicket-keeper

International information
- National side: Pakistan (2005–2008)
- ODI debut (cap 40): 28 December 2005 v Sri Lanka
- Last ODI: 9 May 2008 v India

Domestic team information
- Years: Team
- 2004/05–2005/06: Lahore

Career statistics
Competition	WODI	WLA	WT20
Matches	20	39	6
Runs scored	275	904	142
Batting average	14.47	29.16	23.66
100s/50s	0/0	2/5	0/0
Top score	32	115*	46
Balls bowled	6	42	–
Wickets	0	0	–
Bowling average	–	–	–
5 wickets in innings	0	0	–
10 wickets in match	0	0	–
Best bowling	–	–	–
Catches/stumpings	4/2	8/6	1/1
- Source: , 6 January 2022

Sana Javed (born 27 March 1983) is a former Pakistani cricketer who played as a wicket-keeper and right-handed batter. She appeared in 20 One Day Internationals for Pakistan between 2005 and 2008, including captaining the side at the 2005–06 Women's Asia Cup. She played domestic cricket for Lahore.
