= Meher Minwalla =

Pakistani cricketer (born 1977)

Personal information
- Full name: Meher Dossa Minwalla
- Born: 10 December 1977 (age 48); Pakistan
- Batting: Right-handed
- Bowling: Right-arm medium-fast
- Role: Bowler

International information
- National side: Pakistan (1997–2001)
- ODI debut (cap 5): 28 January 1997 v New Zealand
- Last ODI: 18 April 2001 v Netherlands

Career statistics
Competition	WODI	WLA
Matches	11	12
Runs scored	9	9
Batting average	1.50	1.50
100s/50s	0/0	0/0
Top score	7	7
Balls bowled	126	144
Wickets	1	1
Bowling average	136.00	170.00
5 wickets in innings	0	0
10 wickets in match	0	0
Best bowling	1/25	1/25
Catches/stumpings	3/–	3/–
- Source: CricketArchive, 8 January 2022

Meher Dossa Minwalla (born 10 December 1977) is a Pakistani former cricketer who played as a right-arm medium-fast bowler.

Meher made her debut in international cricket in a One Day International (ODI) against New Zealand on 28 January 1997. She appeared in 11 ODIs for Pakistan between 1997 and 2001.
