= Seema Pujare =

Indian cricketer (born 1976)

Personal information
- Born: 8 September 1976 (age 50); Bombay, India
- Batting: Right-handed
- Bowling: Right-arm off-break

International information
- National side: India
- ODI debut (cap 85): 3 May 2008 v Sri Lanka
- Last ODI: 8 November 2008 v Australia
- Only T20I (cap 14): 28 October 2008 v Australia

Career statistics
Competition	WODI	WT20I
Matches	8	1
Runs scored	10	-
Batting average	5.00	-
100s/50s	0/0	-
Top score	5	-
Balls bowled	330	12
Wickets	11	0
Bowling average	20.18	-
5 wickets in innings	0	-
10 wickets in match	0	-
Best bowling	3/10	-
Catches/stumpings	0/-	0/-
- Source: CricketArchive, 30 April 2020

Seema Pujare (born 8 September 1976) is a former One Day International cricketer who has represents India. She is a right-handed batsman and bowls right-arm off-breaks. She has played eight ODIs, taking eleven wickets, and played one T20I.
