= Sanduni Abeywickrema =

Sri Lankan cricketer (born 1982)

Personal information
- Full name: Abeywickrema Pathiranage Sanduni Lakshika
- Born: 12 December 1982 (age 43); Colombo, Sri Lanka
- Batting: Right-handed
- Bowling: Right-arm off spin

International information
- National side: Sri Lanka
- Source: ESPNcricinfo, 21 September 2016

Sanduni Abeywickrema (born 12 December 1982) is a Sri Lankan cricketer who plays for the Sri Lanka's women's cricket team. A right-handed batter and off-spinner, she made her One Day International (ODI) debut against India on 15 December 2006.
