= Ayesha Naseem =

Pakistani cricketer

Personal information
- Born: 7 August 2004 (age 22); Abbottabad, Pakistan
- Batting: Right handed
- Bowling: Right-arm medium
- Role: Batter

International information
- National side: Pakistan (2020–2023)
- ODI debut (cap 85): 12 July 2021 v West Indies
- Last ODI: 21 January 2023 v Australia
- T20I debut (cap 48): 3 March 2020 v Thailand
- Last T20I: 15 February 2023 v Ireland

Domestic team information
- Years: Team
- 2016–2017: Abbottabad

Career statistics
Competition	WODI	WT20I
Matches	4	30
Runs scored	33	369
Batting average	8.25	19.45
100s/50s	0/0	0/0
Top score	16	45*
Catches/stumpings	1/–	1/–
- Source: ESPNcricinfo, 20 July 2023

Ayesha Naseem (born 7 August 2004) is a Pakistani former cricketer. In January 2020, at the age of 15, she was selected in Pakistan's squad for the 2020 ICC Women's T20 World Cup. She made her Women's Twenty20 International (WT20I) debut for Pakistan, against Thailand, on 3 March 2020. In December 2020, she was named in Pakistan's squad for their series against South Africa. Later the same month, she was shortlisted as one of the Women's Emerging Cricketer of the Year for the 2020 PCB Awards.

In June 2021, she was named in Pakistan's squad for their series against the West Indies. She made her Women's One Day International (WODI) debut on 12 July 2021, for Pakistan against the West Indies. In May 2022, she was named in Pakistan's team for the cricket tournament at the 2022 Commonwealth Games in Birmingham, England.

On 20 July 2023, Naseem announced her retirement from international cricket at the age of 18. She opted to retire in order to live her life according to the teachings of Islam.
