= Tasqeen Qadeer =

Pakistani cricketer

Personal information
- Full name: Tasqeen Qadeer
- Born: 18 April 1979 (age 47); Lahore, Punjab, Pakistan
- Batting: Right handed
- Bowling: Right-arm medium
- Role: Batter

International information
- National side: Pakistan (2005–2008)
- ODI debut (cap 42): 28 December 2005 v Sri Lanka
- Last ODI: 9 May 2008 v India

Domestic team information
- Years: Team
- 2004/05–2006/07: Lahore

Career statistics
Competition	WODI	WLA	WT20
Matches	19	40	4
Runs scored	288	866	12
Batting average	16.00	27.06	6.00
100s/50s	0/0	1/2	0/0
Top score	45	100*	11
Balls bowled	–	60	–
Wickets	–	2	–
Bowling average	–	30.00	–
5 wickets in innings	–	0	–
10 wickets in match	–	0	–
Best bowling	–	1/11	–
Catches/stumpings	0/–	3/–	1/–
- Source: CricketArchive, 5 January 2017

Tasqeen Qadeer (born 18 April 1979) is a Pakistani former cricketer who played as a right-handed batter, often as an opener.

Tasqeen Qadeer made her international debut in the 2005 Asia Cup, where, opening the batting, she impressed by top scoring for Pakistan in a game they eventually lost to Sri Lanka.

She appeared in 19 One Day Internationals for Pakistan between 2005 and 2008. She played domestic cricket for Lahore.
