= Shaiza Khan =

Pakistani cricketer (born 1969)

Personal information
- Full name: Shaiza Said Khan
- Born: 18 March 1969 (age 57); Karachi, Pakistan
- Batting: Right-handed
- Bowling: Right-arm leg break
- Role: All-rounder
- Relatives: Sharmeen Khan (sister)

International information
- National side: Pakistan (1997–2004)
- Test debut (cap 7): 17 April 1998 v Sri Lanka
- Last Test: 15 March 2004 v West Indies
- ODI debut (cap 9): 28 January 1997 v New Zealand
- Last ODI: 2 April 2004 v West Indies

Domestic team information
- Years: Team
- 2005/06: Karachi

Career statistics
Competition	WTest	WODI	WLA
Matches	3	40	46
Runs scored	69	391	517
Batting average	13.80	11.17	13.25
100s/50s	0/0	0/0	0/0
Top score	35	38	38
Balls bowled	864	2,076	2,394
Wickets	19	63	79
Bowling average	24.05	23.95	21.74
5 wickets in innings	2	2	2
10 wickets in match	1	0	0
Best bowling	7/59	5/35	5/35
Catches/stumpings	7/–	7/–	8/–
- Source: CricketArchive, 13 December 2021

Shaiza Said Khan (born 18 March 1969) is a Pakistani former cricketer who played as a right-arm leg break bowler and right-handed batter. She and her sister, Sharmeen, are considered pioneers of women's cricket in Pakistan. She appeared in three Test matches and 40 One Day Internationals for Pakistan between 1997 and 2004, captaining the side throughout this period. She played domestic cricket for Karachi.

Shaiza Khan was born to a wealthy carpet merchant in Karachi. She attended the Convent of Jesus and Mary, Karachi and then joined the Concord College, Acton Burnell, Shropshire for her O & A Levels. She later went to the University of Leeds where she studied Textile Engineering, as well as became the first non-British captain of the women's cricket team. She also played a match for Middlesex in 1991, against East Anglia, in which she took 6/39 from her 11 overs.

She holds the world record for the best bowling figures in a Test match, taking 13/226 against the West Indies in 2004 in Karachi. During her 13-wicket haul she also took a hat-trick, only the second in women's Test history after Betty Wilson's feat against England in February 1958.

She also held the record for the most wickets on a single ground in WODIs, with 23 wickets at National Stadium, Karachi, until it was broken by Shabnim Ismail in 2019.
