= Chamari Polgampola =

Sri Lankan cricketer (born 1981)

Personal information
- Full name: Polgampola Ralalage Chamari Sarojika Kumarihami
- Born: 20 March 1981 (age 45); Warakapola, Sri Lanka
- Batting: Left-handed
- Bowling: Right-arm medium-fast

International information
- National side: Sri Lanka
- ODI debut (cap 29): 25 April 2004 v India
- Last ODI: 29 June 2017 v Australia
- ODI shirt no.: 21
- T20I debut (cap 7): 12 June 2009 v Pakistan
- Last T20I: 17 January 2015 v Pakistan

Career statistics
| Competition | WODI | WT20I |
|---|---|---|
| Matches | 75 | 19 |
| Runs scored | 1083 | 135 |
| Batting average | 15.47 | 7.94 |
| 100s/50s | 0/3 | 0/0 |
| Top score | 68* | 20 |
| Balls bowled | 1758 | 168 |
| Wickets | 34 | 3 |
| Bowling average | 33.11 | 61.00 |
| 5 wickets in innings | 0 | 0 |
| 10 wickets in match | 0 | 0 |
| Best bowling | 4/26 | 1/17 |
| Catches/stumpings | 18/– | 6/– |
Medal record
Representing Sri Lanka
Women's Cricket
Asian Games
| Bronze medal – third place | 2014 Incheon | Team |
- Source: Cricinfo, 19 September 2021

Chamari Polgampola (born 20 March 1981) is a Sri Lankan cricketer. She made her Women's One Day International (WODI) debut against India and her WT20I debut against Pakistan in April 2004 and June 2009, respectively.
