= Pakistan women's national cricket team =

National sports team

Pakistan
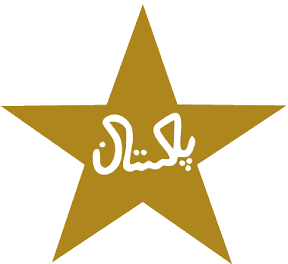
- Nickname: Women in Green
- Association: Pakistan Cricket Board

Personnel
- Captain: Fatima Sana
- Batting coach: Taufeeq Umar
- Bowling coach: Kamran Hussain
- Manager: Nahida Khan

History
- Test status acquired: 1998

International Cricket Council
- ICC status: Full member (1952)
- ICC region: Asia
ICC Rankings	Current	Best-ever
ODI	8th	7th (1 Oct 2015)
T20I	8th	7th (2 May 2014)

Tests
- First Test: v Sri Lanka at Colts Cricket Club Ground, Colombo; 17–20 April 1998
- Last Test: v West Indies at National Stadium, Karachi; 15–18 March 2004
Tests	Played	Won/Lost
Total	3	0/2 (1 draw)
This year	0	0/0 (0 draws)

One Day Internationals
- First ODI: v New Zealand at Hagley Oval, Christchurch; 28 January 1997
- Last ODI: v Sri Lanka at Mahinda Rajapaksa International Cricket Stadium, Hambantota; 28 July 2026
ODIs	Played	Won/Lost
Total	233	70/153 (3 ties, 7 no results)
This year	9	5/4 (0 ties, 0 no results)
- World Cup appearances: 5 (first in 1997)
- Best result: 5th (2009)

T20 Internationals
- First T20I: v Ireland at The Vineyard, Dublin; 25 May 2009
- Last T20I: v Scotland at Seven Districts Ground, Ajman; 22 November 2026
T20Is	Played	Won/Lost
Total	211	85/118 (3 ties, 5 no results)
This year	30	14/15 (0 ties, 1 no result)
- T20 World Cup appearances: 9 (first in 2009)
- Best result: First round (2009, 2010, 2012, 2014, 2016, 2018, 2020, 2023, 2024)
Test kit
ODI kit
T20I kit
- As of 22 November 2026

The Pakistan women's national cricket team, also known as Women in Green, represents Pakistan in international cricket. It is organised by the Pakistan Cricket Board, which is a full member of the International Cricket Council.

Pakistan made its Women's One Day International (WODI) debut in early 1997 against New Zealand, and later in the year played in the 1997 World Cup in India. The team's inaugural Test match came against Sri Lanka in April 1998. In its early years, Pakistan was one of the least competitive of the top-level women's teams, and after its inaugural appearance in 1997, did not qualify for another World Cup until the 2009 event in Australia. However, the team has played in all eight editions of the ICC Women's T20 World Cup to date, and has also participated in the Women's Asia Cup and the Asian Games cricket tournament.

The increase in terrorism as a result of the war on terror led to a stagnation of foreign teams touring Pakistan in the late 2000s and early 2010s. However, due to a decrease in terrorism in Pakistan over the past few years, as well as an increase in security, Bangladesh (twice), West Indies, Sri Lanka, Ireland, and South Africa have toured Pakistan since 2015.

== Coaching staff ==
- Head coach: Vacant
- Fielding and Batting coach: (Pakistan) Hanif Malik
- Fast Bowling coach: (Pakistan) Junaid Khan
- Spin Bowling coach: (Pakistan) Abdur Rahman
- Selector: (Pakistan) Asad Shafiq
- Manager: (Pakistan) Hina Munawar

== History ==
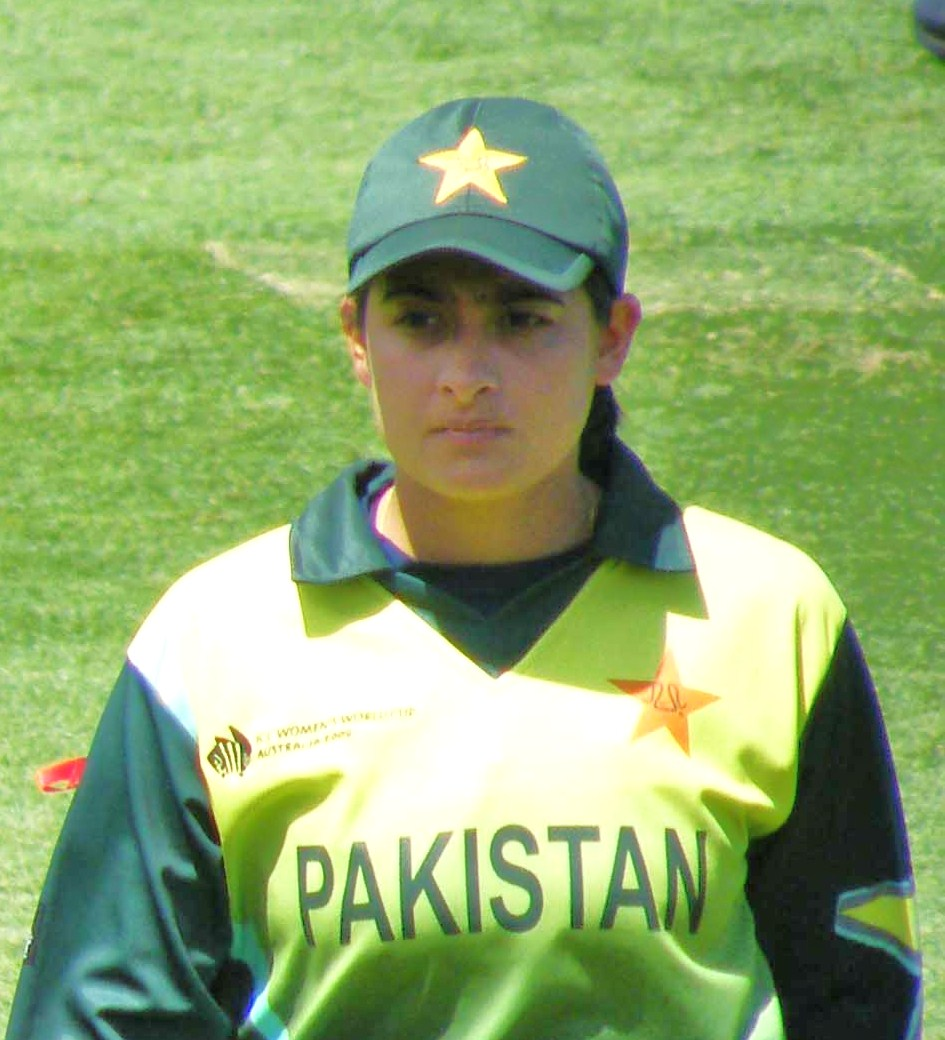
Sana Mir, former captain of Pakistan women cricket team

=== 1990s ===
The concept of women's cricket was first introduced in Pakistan by two sisters, Shaiza and Sharmeen Khan, in 1996. In conservative Pakistan, the creation of a Pakistan women's cricket team was even considered illegal and was met with court cases and even death threats. The government refused them permission to play India in 1997 and ruled that women were forbidden from playing sports in public due to religious issues.

However, the team did manage to overcome these objections and represented Pakistan in 1997, playing against New Zealand and Australia. They lost all three One Day International matches on that tour, but they were still invited to take part in the Women's Cricket World Cup later that year in India. They lost all five matches in the tournament and finished last, out of the eleven teams in the competition. The following year, Pakistan toured Sri Lanka and played three One Day International matches, losing all of their matches and played in their first Test match, which they also lost.

=== 2000s ===
In 2000, Pakistan toured Ireland for a five match One Day International series against Ireland. They lost the Test match by an innings inside two days and the One Day International series 4–0, with one match interrupted by rain. Their first international win, in their 19th match, came against the Netherlands in a seven match One Day International series at their home ground in 2001, a series which they won 4–3. This form did not continue into their six One Day International tour of Sri Lanka in January 2002, though, and they again lost all six matches.

In 2003, Pakistan travelled to the Netherlands to take part in the 2003 IWCC Trophy, the inaugural edition of what is now called simply the World Cup Qualifier. They finished fourth in the tournament, winning against Japan and Scotland. However, they missed out on qualification for the 2005 Women's Cricket World Cup. The 2003 IWCC Trophy was marred by a schism between the Pakistan Women's Cricket Control Association and the Pakistan Cricket Board. The IWCC did not recognize the Pakistan Cricket Board as the governing body of women's cricket in Pakistan and court cases were brought in Pakistan. The Pakistan Cricket Board announced that they would not be sending a team to the tournament and that no other team should be allowed to represent the country in the competition. This problem was overcome with the International Cricket Council requirement that women's associations and men's associations be unified under one single governing body.

2004 saw the West Indies tour Pakistan, playing seven One Day International matches and a Test match. The Test match was drawn and West Indies won the One Day International series 5–2, but those two victories for Pakistan were their first against a Test-playing nation.

In 2005, Pakistan Cricket Board established a women's wing to oversee all cricket affairs under the Pakistan Cricket Board's control and to unite all the conflicts between various associations. The first international event was when the Indian under-21 team toured Pakistan, becoming the first Indian women's side to tour the country. This paved the way for Pakistan to host the second Women's Asia Cup in December 2005/January 2006. They lost all their games however, finishing last in the three-team tournament. The tournament featured the first match between the Indian and Pakistani women's cricket teams.

Early in 2007, the Pakistan squad toured South Africa and played in a five match, One Day International series. During that year, Pakistan was announced as the host for the Women's Cricket World Cup Qualifier in which eight teams were scheduled to participate. All of the arrangements were almost completed for the tournament to be held in November when the event was postponed due to political instability and was moved to South Africa. Pakistan qualified for the 2009 Women's Cricket World Cup by defeating Ireland, Zimbabwe, Scotland and Netherlands. They qualified for this tournament after defeating Hong Kong in a three match series in Pakistan in September 2006.

In Pakistan, views towards women's cricket have softened considerably since its introduction. Cricket is currently seen as an improvement for women's rights.

In June 2019, the PCB reduced the number of contracted players from 17 to 10, but increased remuneration for the retained players.

=== 2020s ===
In the lead up to the 2024 Women's Twenty20 Asia Cup, former men's international cricketer Mohammad Wasim was appointed head coach of the team. He then initiated several measures to overhaul the team, including more effective workload management practices, a greater use of performance data, and a shift in mindset towards a positive brand of cricket.

== World Cup records ==
=== ODI World Cup ===
Pakistan have participated in five editions of the Women's Cricket World Cup: in 1997, 2009, 2013, 2017, and 2022. They did not win any of their matches during the 1997 Cricket World Cup and finished in eleventh place.

Pakistan saw their first win in the 2009 World Cup; they advanced to the Super Six round defeating Sri Lanka in group stage match by 57 runs with Nain Abidi scoring 26 runs, and the player of the match Qanita Jalil taking 3 wickets for 33. They qualified for the 5th place playoff match defeating West Indies in the Super Sixes by 4 wickets, but finished at 6th place losing to the same team by 3 wickets.

They were winless in both the 2013 World Cup and the 2017 World Cup, finishing bottom of the group stage tables in both tournaments.

It was not until the 2022 edition that Pakistan was able to earn another victory at the ODI World Cup. This came against the West Indies at Seddon Park, Hamilton, where they beat them by eight wickets in a group stage game, thus ending a 13-year 18-match losing streak. However, they finished bottom of the group stage table, having lost all of their other six matches.

=== T20I World Cup ===
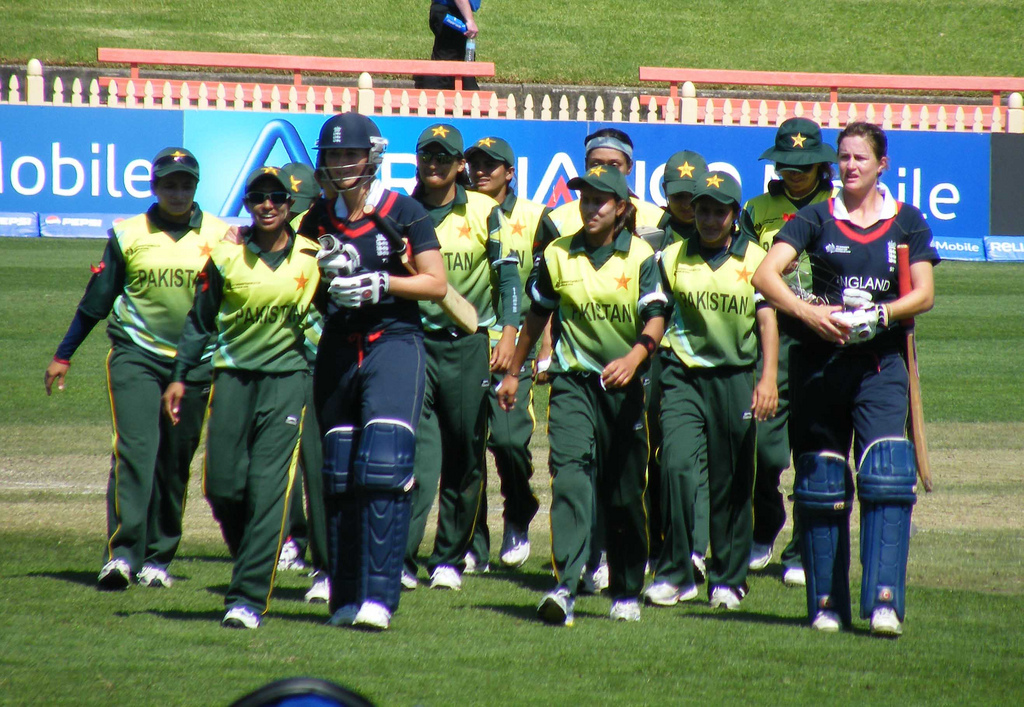
Pakistan Women's team during the ICC T20 World Cup

Pakistan have participated in all the editions of the ICC Women's World Twenty20. They lost all of their games in 2009 ICC Women's World Twenty20 and 2010 ICC Women's World Twenty20. In the 2012 edition, they registered their solitary win over India. Pakistan defeated them by 1 run with Sana Mir scoring 26 runs and Nida Dar—who was awarded player of the match—taking 3 wickets for 12 runs. Pakistan finished with 7th place playoff in the 2014 ICC Women's World Twenty20; they defeated Sri Lanka by 14 runs in the playoffs. Bismah Maroof scored 62 runs not out and Sania Khan took 3 wickets for 24 runs. Maroof was awarded woman of the match.

== Asia Cup ==
The Pakistan women's cricket team did not participate in the inaugural edition of the women's Asia cup in 2004–05, Sri Lanka and India played a five-match series in Sri Lanka. Pakistan hosted the second edition of the Asia Cup in 2005–06, but they did not win a single game of the tournament. India won the final by 97 runs, against Sri Lanka, played at the National Stadium, Karachi. In the third edition of the women's Asia Cup, once again Pakistan failed to see a victory, and this was the third consecutive occasion that India and Sri Lanka were playing in the final. In the 2008 edition of the Women's Asia Cup, Pakistan registered their only victory against the Bangladeshi women's cricket team who were participating for the first time in Asia Cup.

The 2012 edition was a Twenty20 version of the game that took place in Guangzhou, China, from 24 to 31 October 2012. Pakistan reached into the final of the tournament, and lost to India by 18 runs. Bismah Maroof was awarded woman of the tournament for her all-round performance.

== Asian Games ==
=== 2010 Asian Games ===
The Pakistan national women's cricket team won a gold medal in the inaugural women's cricket tournament at the 2010 Asian Games that took place in Guangzhou, China. In the final match at the 2010 Asian Games, Pakistan defeated Bangladesh women cricket team by 10 wickets. Bangladeshi women made 92 runs for 9 wickets with their captain Salma Khatun scoring 24; Nida Dar took 3 wickets giving away 16 runs in 4 overs. Pakistan women achieved the target of 93 runs in 15.4 overs without losing wickets: Dar scored 51 from 43 balls and Javeria Khan scored 39 runs from 51 balls, both remained not out. Asif Ali Zardari, the then-president of Pakistan, termed the team's win as a "gift to the nation riding on a series of crises" as 21 million people were affected by flood in 2010.

=== 2014 Asian Games ===
In the 2014 Asian games, Pakistan women's cricket team again defeated the Bangladesh women's cricket team in the final match by four runs in Incheon, South Korea. In the low scoring match, Pakistan women scored 97 runs in 20 overs for 6 wickets. The match was interrupted by rain. Bangladesh women innings reduced to 7 overs and their revised target was 43 runs per Duckworth–Lewis method; they scored 38 runs for 9 wickets. This was the second consecutive title won by the Pakistan women against the same team in the Asian Games.

=== 2022 Asian Games ===
Pakistan women's cricket team lost the bronze medal match to Bangladesh by five wickets, finishing fourth in the tournament. Bangladesh chased down Pakistan's target of 65 runs in 18.2 overs to win the bronze medal. This was a disappointing result for Pakistan, who had previously won gold at the 2010 and 2014 Asian Games.

=== 2026 Asian Games ===
Pakistan women won the bronze medal at the 2026 Asian Games by defeating Bangladesh by 31 runs in the third-place playoff. After being reduced to 67 for 5, captain Fatima Sana smashed 45 off 30 balls to lift Pakistan to 145 for 8. Umm-e-Hani then took 3 for 10 as Bangladesh were restricted to 114 for 7, sealing Pakistan's third Asian Games cricket medal.

== Tournament history ==
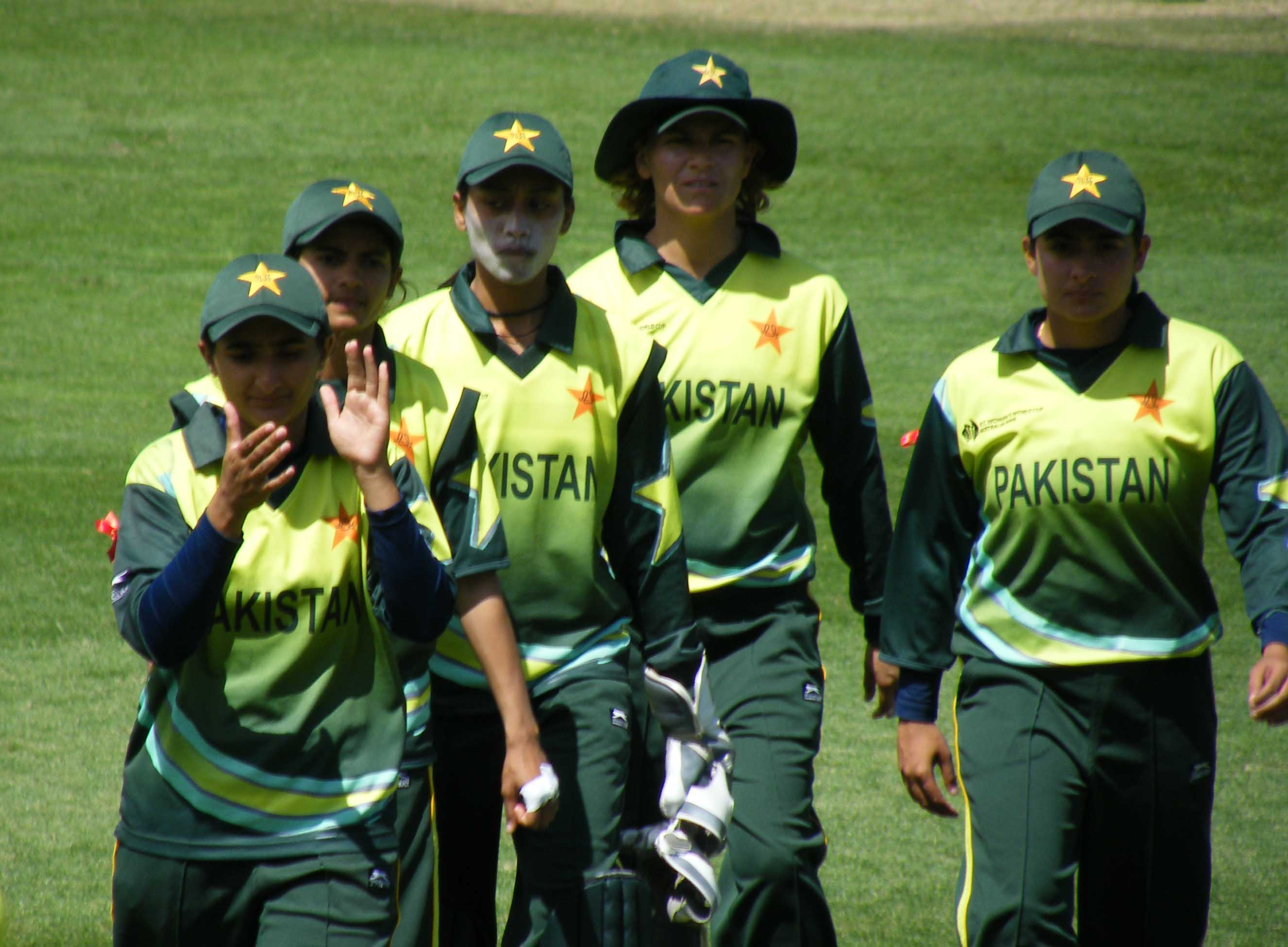
Team Pakistan at 2009 ODI World Cup in Sydney

A red box around the year indicates tournaments played within Pakistan

=== ODI World Cup ===
World Cup record
Year	Round	Position	GP	W	L	T	NR
(England) 1973	Team did not exist						
(India) 1978	Team did not exist						
(New Zealand) 1982	Team did not exist						
(Australia) 1988	Team did not exist						
(England) 1993	Team did not exist						
(India) 1997	Group Stage	11/11	5	0	5	0	0
(New Zealand) 2000	Did not participate						
(South Africa) 2005	Did not participate						
(Australia) 2009	Super Sixes	5/8	7	2	5	0	0
(India) 2013	Group Stage	8/8	4	0	4	0	0
(England) 2017	Group Stage	8/8	7	0	7	0	0
(New Zealand) 2022	Group Stage	8/8	7	1	6	0	0
(India) 2025	Group Stage	8/8	7	0	4	0	3
Total	6/12	0 Titles	37	3	31	0	3

=== T20 World Cup ===
T20 World Cup record
Year	Round	Position	GP	W	L	T	NR
(England) 2009	Group Stage	8/8	3	0	3	0	0
(Cricket West Indies) 2010	Group Stage	8/8	3	0	3	0	0
(Sri Lanka) 2012	Group Stage	7/8	4	1	3	0	0
(Bangladesh) 2014	Group Stage	8/10	6	2	4	0	0
(India) 2016	Group Stage	6/10	4	2	2	0	0
(Cricket West Indies) 2018	Group Stage	8/10	4	1	3	0	0
(Australia) 2020	Group Stage	7/10	4	1	2	0	1
(South Africa) 2023	Group Stage	8/10	4	1	3	0	0
(United Arab Emirates) 2024	Group Stage	8/10	4	1	3	0	0
(England) 2026	Group stage	11/12	5	1	4	0	0
Total	9/9	0 Titles	41	10	30	0	1

=== Asia Cup ===
Year	Round	Position	GP	W	L	T	NR
(Sri Lanka) 2006	Did not participate						
(Pakistan) 2005–06	Group Stage	3/3	4	0	4	0	0
(India) 2006	Group Stage	3/3	4	0	4	0	0
(Sri Lanka) 2008	Group Stage	3/4	6	1	5	0	0
(China) 2012	Runners-ups	2/8	5	3	2	0	0
(Thailand) 2016	Runners-ups	2/6	6	4	2	0	0
(Malaysia) 2018	Group Stage	3/6	5	3	2	0	0
(Bangladesh) 2022	Semi-finals	3/7	7	5	2	0	0
(Sri Lanka) 2024	Semi-finals	4/8	4	2	2	0	0
(United Arab Emirates) 2026	Semi-finals	4/8	4	2	2	0	0
Total	9/10	0 Title	45	20	25	0	0

=== Asian Games ===
Asian Games record
Year	Round	Position	GP	W	L	T	NR
(China) 2010	Champions	1/8	4	4	0	0	0
(South Korea) 2014	Champions	1/10	3	3	0	0	0
(China) 2022	Semi-finals	4/9	3	0	2	0	1
(Japan) 2026	Semi-finals	3/8	3	2	1	0	0
Total	4/4	2 Titles	13	9	3	0	1

== Honours ==
=== ACC ===
- Women's Asia Cup:
  - Runners-up (2): 2012, 2016

=== Others ===
- Asian Games
  - Gold Medal (2): 2010, 2014
  - Bronze Medal: 2026

== Squad ==
This lists all active players who have a central contract or was named in the most recent ODI or T20I squad. Uncapped players are listed in italics. Updated as on 25 August 2024

Name	Age	Batting style	Bowling style	Contract	Forms	Notes
Batters
Sidra Ameen	34	Right-handed	Right-arm medium	A	ODI, T20I	
Aliya Riaz	34	Right-handed	Right-arm medium	B	ODI, T20I	
Sadaf Shamas	27	Right-handed	Right-arm leg break	D	ODI, T20I	
Ayesha Zafar	32	Right-handed	Right-arm leg break	-	ODI	
Gull Feroza	27	Right-handed		-	ODI, T20I	
Shawaal Zulfiqar	21	Right-handed	Right-arm medium	D		
Iram Javed	34	Right-handed	Right-arm medium	-	T20I	
Eyman Fatima	22	Right-handed	Right-arm medium	D		
All-rounders
Nida Dar	39	Right-handed	Right-arm off break	A	ODI, T20I	
Omaima Sohail	29	Right-handed	Right-arm medium-fast	C	ODI, T20I	
Natalia Pervaiz	30	Right-handed	Right-arm medium-fast	-	ODI, T20I	
Wicket-keepers
Muneeba Ali	29	Right-handed	-	B	ODI, T20I	
Najiha Alvi	23	Right-handed	-	D	ODI, T20I	
Sidra Nawaz	32	Right-handed	-	C		
Spin Bowlers
Nashra Sandhu	29	Right-handed	Slow left-arm orthodox	B	ODI, T20I	
Sadia Iqbal	31	Left-handed	Slow left-arm orthodox	C	ODI, T20I	
Umm-e-Hani	30	Right-handed	Right-arm off break	D	ODI	
Tuba Hassan	26	Right-handed	Right-arm leg break	D	ODI, T20I	
Ghulam Fatima	31	Right-handed	Right-arm leg break	C		
Syeda Aroob Shah	22	Right-handed	Right-arm leg break	D	T20I	
Rameen Shamim	30	Left-handed	Right-arm off break	-	ODI	
Anosha Nasir	21	Right-handed	Slow left-arm orthodox	D		
Pace Bowlers
Fatima Sana	25	Right-handed	Right-arm medium	B	ODI, T20I	Captain
Diana Baig	31	Right-handed	Right-arm medium	C	ODI, T20I	
Waheeda Akhtar	31	Right-handed	Right-arm medium-fast	-	ODI	
Tasmia Rubab	23	Right-handed	Left-arm medium-fast	-	T20I	

== Records and statistics ==
International Match Summary — Pakistan Women

Last updated 22 November 2026

Playing Record
Format	M	W	L	T	NR/Draw	Inaugural Match
Women's Test	3	0	2	0	1	17 April 1998
Women's One-Day Internationals	233	70	153	3	7	28 January 1997
Women's Twenty20 Internationals	211	85	118	3	5	25 May 2009

=== Women's Test cricket ===
- Highest team total: 426/7d v. West Indies on 15 March 2004 at National Stadium, Karachi.
- Highest individual score: 242, Kiran Baluch v. West Indies on 15 March 2004 at National Stadium, Karachi.
- Best innings bowling: 7/59, Shaiza Khan v. West Indies on 15 March 2004 at National Stadium, Karachi.

Most Test runs for Pakistan Women

Player	Runs	Average	Career span
Kiran Baluch	360	60.00	1998–2004
Sajjida Shah	100	33.33	2000–2004
Shaiza Khan	69	13.80	1998–2004

Most Test wickets for Pakistan Women

Player	Wickets	Average	Career span
Shaiza Khan	19	24.05	1998–2004
Nazia Nazir	7	22.85	1998–2004
Sharmeen Khan	5	25.80	1998–2004

Women's Test record versus other nations

Records complete to Women's Test #122. Last updated 18 March 2004.

Opponent	Matches	Won	Lost	Tied	Draw	First match	First win
Ireland	1	0	1	0	0	30–31 July 2000	
Sri Lanka	1	0	1	0	0	17–20 April 1998	
West Indies	1	0	0	0	1	15–18 March 2004	

=== Women's One-Day International ===
- Highest team total: 345 v. South Africa on 25 February 2026 at Gaddafi Stadium, Lahore.
- Highest individual score: 176*, Sidra Ameen v. Ireland on 4 November 2022 at Gaddafi Stadium, Lahore.
- Best innings bowling: 7/4, Sajjida Shah v. Japan on 21 July 2003 at Sportpark Drieburg, Amsterdam.

Most ODI runs for Pakistan Women

Player	Runs	Average	Career span
Bismah Maroof	3278	29.53	2006–2023
Javeria Khan	2885	28.56	2008–2022
Sidra Ameen	1674	28.86	2011–2023
Sana Mir	1630	17.91	2005–2019
Nain Abidi	1625	20.83	2006–2017

Most ODI wickets for Pakistan Women

Player	Wickets	Average	Career span
Sana Mir	151	24.27	2005–2019
Nida Dar	98	30.90	2010–2023
Nashra Sandhu	82	28.17	2017–2023
Sadia Yousuf	78	22.78	2008–2017
Asmavia Iqbal	70	36.20	2005–2017

Highest individual innings in Women's ODI

Player	Score	Opposition	Venue	Match Date
Sidra Ameen	176*	Ireland	Lahore	4 November 2022
Javeria Khan	133*	Sri Lanka	Sharjah	13 January 2015
Sidra Ameen	122	South Africa	Lahore	19 September 2025
Sidra Ameen	121*	South Africa	Lahore	16 September 2025
Javeria Khan	113*	Sri Lanka	Dambulla	20 March 2018

Best bowling figures in an innings in Women's ODI

Player	Score	Opposition	Venue	Match Date
Sajjida Shah	7/4	Japan	Amsterdam	21 July 2003
Nashra Sandhu	6/26	South Africa	Lahore	22 September 2025
Sana Mir	5/32	Netherlands	Potchefstroom	9 October 2010
Urooj Mumtaz	5/33	West Indies	Karachi	23 March 2004
Shaiza Khan	5/35	Netherlands	Karachi	11 April 2001

WODI record versus other nations

Records complete to WODI #1556. Last updated 28 July 2026.

Opponent	Matches	Won	Lost	Tied	N/R	First match	First win
ICC Full members
Australia	17	0	17	0	0	7 February 1997	
Bangladesh	17	8	8	1	0	20 August 2012	20 August 2012
England	16	0	13	0	3	12 December 1997	
India	12	0	12	0	0	30 December 2005	
Ireland	22	16	6	0	0	18 December 1997	18 February 2008
New Zealand	18	1	15	1	1	28 January 1997	12 December 1997
South Africa	35	7	26	1	1	16 December 1997	24 November 2011
Sri Lanka	37	12	24	0	1	11 April 1998	21 April 2011
West Indies	38	11	27	0	0	25 July 2003	25 March 2004
Zimbabwe	4	4	0	0	0	27 November 2021	27 November 2021
ICC Associate members
Denmark	1	0	1	0	0	10 December 1997	
Japan	1	1	0	0	0	21 July 2003	21 July 2003
Netherlands	12	7	4	0	1	9 April 2001	9 April 2001
Scotland	2	2	0	0	0	22 July 2003	22 July 2003
Thailand	1	1	0	0	0	17 April 2025	17 April 2025

WT20I record versus other nations

Records complete to WT20I #3090 Last updated 22 November 2026.

Opponent	Matches	Won	Lost	Tied	N/R	First match	First win
ICC Full members
Australia	17	0	15	0	2	29 September 2012	
Bangladesh	23	18	5	0	0	29 August 2012	29 August 2012
Barbados	1	0	1	0	0	29 July 2022	
England	18	1	17	0	0	16 June 2009	5 July 2013
India	18	3	15	0	0	13 June 2009	1 October 2012
Ireland	24	16	8	0	0	25 May 2009	28 May 2009
New Zealand	12	2	10	0	0	10 May 2010	3 December 2023
South Africa	28	12	16	0	0	16 October 2010	19 January 2014
Sri Lanka	26	12	13	0	1	12 June 2009	16 January 2015
West Indies	24	4	16	3	1	6 September 2011	10 September 2011
Zimbabwe	4	4	0	0	0	12 May 2026	12 May 2026
ICC Associate members
Hong Kong	1	1	0	0	0	7 September 2026	7 September 2026
Malaysia	2	2	0	0	0	7 June 2018	7 June 2018
Nepal	1	1	0	0	0	21 July 2024	21 July 2024
Netherlands	3	2	1	0	0	24 April 2011	24 April 2011
Scotland	1	1	0	0	0	22 November 2026	22 November 2026
Thailand	6	4	1	0	1	3 June 2018	3 June 2018
United Arab Emirates	2	2	0	0	0	9 October 2022	9 October 2022

Note: Pakistan Women lost all 3 tied matches against West Indies in Super Over.

== See also ==
- List of Pakistan women Test cricketers
- List of Pakistan women ODI cricketers
- List of Pakistan women Twenty20 International cricketers
- Pakistan women's under-19 cricket team
