= 2016 Women's Super 3s =

- Dates: 1 May – 16 July 2016
- Administrator: Cricket Ireland
- Cricket format: 50 over and Twenty20
- Tournament format: League
- Champions: Dragons (1st title)
- Participants: 3
- Matches: 9

The 2016 Women's Super 3s, known for sponsorship reasons as the 2016 Toyota Super 3s, was the second Women's Super 3s competition that took place in Ireland. It ran from May to July, with 3 teams taking part made up of the best players in Ireland. The teams played 6 matches each, four 50 over matches and two Twenty20s. Dragons won the competition, winning their first title.

== Competition format ==
The three teams played six matches each in a league system. Each team played the other two sides twice in a 50 over match and once in a Twenty20 match, with all matches contributing to a unified table.

The league worked on a points system with positions being based on the total points. Points were awarded as follows:

Win: 2 points.
Tie: 1 point.
Loss: 0 points.
Abandoned/No Result: 1 point.

== Squads ==
Dragons	Scorchers	Typhoons
Laura Delany (Captain); Katie Boylan; Rachel Delaney; Jennifer Gray; Cecelia Joyce; Shauna Kavanagh; Gaby Lewis; Hannah Little; Caoimhe McCann; Louise McCarthy; Sophie MacMahon; Lara Maritz; Ciara Metcalfe; Ruby Neville; Mary Waldron	Kim Garth (Captain); Aoife Beggs; Hannah de Burgh Whyte; Hannah Grieve; Isobel Joyce; Meg Kendal; Anna Kerrison; Anna Kirk; Erin Lawlor; Orla Martin; Cara Murray; Alison O'Reilly; Lucy O'Reilly; Una Raymond-Hoey; Ellen Ridgeway	Amy Kenealy (Captain); Laura Boylan; Catherine Dalton; Veronica Fay-Watt; Vanessa Kelada; Robyn Lewis; Tori Lapsley; Naomi Matthews; Kate McKenna; Natasha Morton; Leah Paul; Anna Peterson; Melissa Scott-Hayward; Clare Shillington; Lucy Small

Source: Cricket Ireland

== Points table ==
Team	Pld	W	L	T	NR	A	Pts	NRR
Dragons (C)	6	4	1	0	0	1	9	1.304
Scorchers	6	2	2	0	0	2	6	0.057
Typhoons	6	1	4	0	0	1	3	–1.326

Source: CricketArchive
