= 2017 Women's Super 3s =

- Dates: 11 June – 13 August 2017
- Administrator: Cricket Ireland
- Cricket format: 50 over and Twenty20
- Tournament format: League
- Champions: Scorchers (2nd title)
- Participants: 3
- Matches: 15

The 2017 Women's Super 3s, known for sponsorship reasons as the 2017 Toyota Super 3s, was the third Women's Super 3s competition that took place in Ireland. It ran from June to August, with 3 teams taking part made up of the best players in Ireland. The teams played 10 matches each, four 50 over matches and six Twenty20s. Scorchers won the competition, winning their second title.

== Competition format ==
The three teams played ten matches each in a league system. Each team played the other two sides twice in a 50 over match and three times in a Twenty20 match, with all matches contributing to a unified table.

The league worked on a points system with positions being based on the total points. Points were awarded as follows:

Win: 2 points.
Tie: 1 point.
Loss: 0 points.
Abandoned/No Result: 1 point.

== Squads ==
| Dragons | Scorchers | Typhoons |
|---|---|---|
| Shauna Kavanagh (Captain); Katie Boylan; Alana Dalzell; Rachel Delaney; Amy Hunter; Cecelia Joyce; Gaby Lewis; Shana Lipson Ngai; Hannah Little; Lara Maritz; Tara Maritz; Caoimhe McCanna; Louise McCarthy; Ciara Metcalfe; Ruby Neville; Mary Waldron | Kim Garth (Captain); Aoife Beggs; Aisling Byrne; Hannah de Burgh Whyte; Isobel Joyce; Anna Kerrison; Anna Kirk; Julie Logue; Orla Martin; Cathy Murphy; Cara Murray; Lucy O'Reilly; Orla Prendergast; Jemma Rankin; Una Raymond-Hoey; Rebecca Stokell; Cliona Tucker | Laura Delany (Captain); Amy Benson; Laura Boylan; Sadhbh Breslin; Jennifer Gray; Vanessa Kelada; Amy Kenealy; Robyn Lewis; Louise Little; Sophie MacMahon; Kate McKenna; Natasha Morton; Leah Paul; Ellen Ridgeway; Rebecca Rolfe; Clare Shillington |

Source: Cricket Ireland

== Points table ==
| Team | Pld | W | L | T | NR | A | Pts | NRR |
|---|---|---|---|---|---|---|---|---|
| Scorchers (C) | 10 | 7 | 1 | 0 | 1 | 1 | 16 | 0.981 |
| Typhoons | 10 | 4 | 5 | 0 | 1 | 0 | 9 | –0.041 |
| Dragons | 10 | 2 | 7 | 0 | 0 | 1 | 5 | –0.951 |

Source: CricketArchive
