= 2018 Women's Super 3s =

- Dates: 4 May – 8 September 2018
- Administrator(s): Cricket Ireland
- Cricket format: 50 over and Twenty20
- Tournament format(s): League
- Champions: Dragons (2nd title)
- Participants: 3
- Matches: 15

The 2018 Women's Super 3s, known for sponsorship reasons as the 2018 Toyota Super 3s, was the fourth Women's Super 3s competition that took place in Ireland. It ran from May to September, with 3 teams taking part made up of the best players in Ireland. The teams played 10 matches each, four 50 over matches and six Twenty20s. Dragons won the competition, winning their second title.

== Competition format ==
The three teams played ten matches each in a league system. Each team played the other two sides twice in a 50 over match and three times in a Twenty20 match, with all matches contributing to a unified table.

The league worked on a points system with positions being based on the total points. Points were awarded as follows:

Win: 2 points.
Tie: 1 point.
Loss: 0 points.
Abandoned/No Result: 1 point.

== Squads ==
Dragons	Scorchers	Typhoons
Shauna Kavanagh (Captain); Paris Crowe; Rachel Delaney; Amy Hunter; Cecelia Joyce; Gaby Lewis; Hannah Little; Lara Maritz; Tess Maritz; Orla Martin; Caoimhe McCann; Louise McCarthy; Ciara Metcalfe; Ruby Neville; Kerry-Anne Tomlinson; Mary Waldron; Niamh Walsh	Kim Garth (Captain); Aisling Byrne; Sarah Condron; Hannah de Burgh Whyte; Isabella Fitzgibbon; Isobel Joyce; Anna Kerrison; Anna Kirk; Cathy Murphy; Cara Murray; Lucy O'Reilly; Orla Prendergast; Jemma Rankin; Una Raymond-Hoey; Alana Ryan; Rebecca Stokell; Cliona Tucker	Laura Delany (Captain); Amy Benson; Aoife Beggs; Sadhbh Breslin; Jennifer Gray; Vanessa Kelada; Amy Kenealy; Robyn Lewis; Louise Little; Matilda Lugg; Sophie MacMahon; Naomi Matthews; Natasha Morton; Leah Paul; Celeste Raack; Eimear Richardson; Ellen Ridgeway; Clare Shillington

Source: Cricket Ireland

== Points table ==
Team	Pld	W	L	T	NR	A	Pts	NRR
Dragons (C)	10	6	2	0	1	1	14	0.861
Typhoons	10	4	6	0	0	0	8	–0.554
Scorchers	10	3	5	0	1	1	8	–0.144

Source: CricketArchive
