= 2015 Women's Super 3s =

- Dates: 10 May – 9 August 2015
- Administrator: Cricket Ireland
- Cricket format: 50 over and Twenty20
- Tournament format: League
- Champions: Scorchers (1st title)
- Participants: 3
- Matches: 12

The 2015 Women's Super 3s was the inaugural Women's Super 3s competition that took place in Ireland. It ran from May to August, with 3 teams taking part made up of the best players in Ireland, with the aim of bridging the gap between club cricket and international cricket. The teams played 8 matches each, four 50 over matches and four Twenty20s. Scorchers were the inaugural winners of the competition, with five wins from their eight matches.

== Competition format ==
The three teams played eight matches each in a league system. Each team played the other two sides twice in a 50 over match and twice in a Twenty20 match, with all matches contributing to a unified table.

The league worked on a points system with positions being based on the total points. Points were awarded as follows:

Win: 2 points.
Tie: 1 point.
Loss: 0 points.
Abandoned/No Result: 1 point.

== Squads ==
Dragons	Scorchers	Typhoons
Mary Waldron (Captain); Katie Boylan; Laura Delany; Rachel Delaney; Valmai Gee; Fiona Gill; Jennifer Gray; Cecelia Joyce; Shauna Kavanagh; Gaby Lewis; Ciara Metcalfe; Sophie MacMahon; Ruby Neville; Rebecca Stokell	Kim Garth (Captain); Hannah de Burgh Whyte; Pia Diepman; Hannah Grieve; Brooke Hepburn; Isobel Joyce; Meg Kendal; Anna Kerrison; Robyn Lewis; Hannah McKay; Lucy O'Reilly; Leah Paul; Una Raymond-Hoey; Rebecca Rolfe	Elena Tice (Captain); Veronica Fay-Watt; Emma Flanagan; Vanessa Kelada; Amy Kenealy; Tori Lapsley; Naomi Matthews; Louise McCarthy; Kate McKenna; Sasha Moloney; Alison O'Reilly; Eimear Richardson; Clare Shillington; Lucy Small

Source: Cricket Ireland

== Points table ==
Team	Pld	W	L	T	NR	A	Pts	NRR
Scorchers (C)	8	5	2	1	0	0	11	0.972
Dragons	8	4	3	1	0	0	9	0.505
Typhoons	8	2	6	0	0	0	4	–1.596

Source: CricketArchive
