= 2019 Women's Super 3s =

- Dates: 19 May – 28 July 2019
- Administrator(s): Cricket Ireland
- Cricket format: 50 over and Twenty20
- Tournament format(s): League
- Champions: Dragons (3rd title)
- Participants: 3
- Matches: 15

The 2019 Women's Super 3s, known for sponsorship reasons as the 2019 Toyota Super 3s, was the fifth Women's Super 3s competition that took place in Ireland. It ran from May to July, with 3 teams taking part made up of the best players in Ireland. The teams played 10 matches each, two 50 over matches and eight Twenty20s. Dragons won the competition, winning their third title, and second in two seasons.

== Competition format ==
The three teams played ten matches each in a league system. Each team played the other two sides once in a 50 over match and four times in a Twenty20 match, with all matches contributing to a unified table.

The league worked on a points system with positions being based on the total points. Points were awarded as follows:

Win: 2 points.
Tie: 1 point.
Loss: 0 points.
Abandoned/No Result: 1 point.

== Squads ==
| Dragons | Scorchers | Typhoons |
|---|---|---|
| Kim Garth (Captain); Aoife Beggs; Aoife Brennan; Ava Canning; Alana Dalzell; Rachel Delaney; Anna Kerrison; Jane Maguire; Lara Maritz; Staci Maxwell; Eimear Mullen; Cliodhna O'Reardon; Clare Shillington; Jenny Sparrow; Kerry-Anne Tomlinson; Erica Turner; Mary Waldron; Sarah White | Shauna Kavanagh (Captain); Sadhbh Breslin; Sarah Forbes; Jennifer Gray; Cecelia Joyce; Isobel Joyce; Amy Kenealy; Ali Keenan; Gaby Lewis; Hannah Little; Sophie MacMahon; Tess Maritz; Caoimhe McCann; Cara Murray; Mya Naughton; Lucy O'Reilly; Rebecca Stokell | Laura Delany (Captain); Aisling Byrne; Sarah Condron; Zara Craig; Amy Hunter; Vanessa Kelada; Maria Kerrison; Anna Kirk; Robyn Lewis; Louise Little; Naomi Matthews; Leah Paul; Orla Prendergast; Celeste Raack; Una Raymond-Hoey; Cassie Stephens; Cliona Tucker; Niamh Walsh |

Source: Cricket Ireland

== Points table ==
| Team | Pld | W | L | T | NR | A | Pts | NRR |
|---|---|---|---|---|---|---|---|---|
| Dragons (C) | 10 | 5 | 2 | 0 | 1 | 2 | 13 | 0.155 |
| Scorchers | 10 | 3 | 4 | 0 | 0 | 3 | 9 | –0.078 |
| Typhoons | 10 | 3 | 5 | 0 | 1 | 1 | 8 | –0.072 |

Source: CricketArchive
