= South Africa women's cricket team in Ireland in 2016 =

International cricket tour

South African women in Ireland
	Ireland women	South Africa women
- Dates: 1 – 11 August 2016
Captains	Laura Delany	Dinesha Devnarain

One Day International series
- Results: South Africa women won the 4-match series 3–1
Most runs	Kim Garth (139)	Laura Wolvaardt (215)
Most wickets	Ciara Metcalfe (8)	Suné Luus (14)
- Player of the series: Suné Luus (SA)

Twenty20 International series
- Results: 2-match series drawn 1–1
Most runs	Clare Shillington (78)	Mignon du Preez (66)
Most wickets	Kim Garth (4)	Ayabonga Khaka (2); Marcia Letsoalo (2); Suné Luus (2)
- Player of the series: Suné Luus (SA)

South African women's cricket team toured Ireland in August 2016. The tour consisted of four Women's One Day International (ODI) matches and two Women's Twenty20 International (T20I) matches. South Africa won the ODI series 3–1 and drawn the T20I series 1–1. During the tour, Ireland recorded their first wins over South Africa in international cricket (male or female) by winning the 2nd T20I and the 4th ODI.

== Squads ==
T20Is		ODIs	
Ireland	South Africa	Ireland	South Africa
Laura Delany (c); Cath Dalton; Kim Garth; Jennifer Gray; Isobel Joyce; Shauna Kavanagh; Amy Kenealy; Gaby Lewis; Louise McCarthy; Ciara Metcalfe; Lucy O'Reilly; Leah Paul; Clare Shillington; Mary Waldron (wk)	Dinesha Devnarain (c); Trisha Chetty (wk); Moseline Daniels; Mignon du Preez; Yolani Fourie; Lara Goodall; Ayabonga Khaka; Masabata Klaas; Odine Kirsten; Marcia Letsoalo; Suné Luus; Andrie Steyn; Chloe Tryon; Laura Wolvaardt	Laura Delany (c); Cath Dalton; Kim Garth; Cecelia Joyce; Isobel Joyce; Meg Kendal; Amy Kenealy; Gaby Lewis; Louise McCarthy; Ciara Metcalfe; Lucy O'Reilly; Una Raymond-Hoey; Clare Shillington; Mary Waldron (wk)	Dinesha Devnarain (c); Trisha Chetty (wk); Moseline Daniels; Mignon du Preez; Yolani Fourie; Lara Goodall; Ayabonga Khaka; Masabata Klaas; Odine Kirsten; Marcia Letsoalo; Suné Luus; Andrie Steyn; Chloe Tryon; Laura Wolvaardt

== WT20I series ==
=== 1st T20I ===
1 August
16:00 IST
(UTC+1) (D/N)
Scorecard

Ireland; 140/4 (20 overs)	v	South Africa; 144/6 (20 overs)
Isobel Joyce 31* (24); Suné Luus 2/24 (4 overs)		Mignon du Preez 55 (41); Kim Garth 2/30 (4 overs)

South Africa won by 4 wickets
YMCA Cricket Club, Dublin
Umpires: Azam Baig (Ire) and Paul Reynolds (Ire)

- South Africa won the toss and elected to field.
- Laura Wolvaardt (SA) made her T20I debut.

=== 2nd T20I ===
3 August
16:00 IST
(UTC+1) (D/N)
Scorecard

Ireland; 115/7 (20 overs)	v	South Africa; 95 (19.3 overs)
Clare Shillington 48 (41); Marcia Letsoalo 2/17 (4 overs)		Trisha Chetty 27 (39); Kim Garth 2/12 (4 overs)

Ireland won by 20 runs
YMCA Cricket Club, Dublin
Umpires: Azam Baig (Ire) and Paul Reynolds (Ire)

- South Africa won the toss and elected to field.
- This was Ireland's first ever (male or female) cricket win against South Africa.

== WODI series ==
=== 1st ODI ===
5 August
10:45 IST
(UTC+1)
Scorecard

South Africa; 283/7 (50 overs)	v	Ireland; 194 (44.5 overs)
Chloe Tryon 92 (68); Kim Garth 3/61 (9 overs)		Kim Garth 72* (79); Suné Luus 6/36 (10 overs)

South Africa won by 89 runs
Anglesea Road Cricket Ground, Dublin
Umpires: Alan Neill (Ire) and Paul Reynolds (Ire)

- Ireland won the toss and elected to field.
- Cath Dalton (Ire), Gaby Lewis (Ire) and Odine Kirsten (SA) made their ODI debut.
- Suné Luus (SA) became the second player to score a half-century and take a five-for in a women's ODI.

=== 2nd ODI ===
7 August
10:45 IST
(UTC+1)
Scorecard

South Africa; 272/6 (50 overs)	v	Ireland; 204 (48.2 overs)
Mignon du Preez 116* (99); Ciara Metcalfe 2/40 (10 overs)		Mary Waldron 42 (72); Masabata Klaas 2/6 (2 overs)

South Africa won by 68 runs
YMCA Cricket Club, Dublin
Umpires: Alan Neill (Ire) and Sum Wijesundera (Ire)

- South Africa won the toss and elected to bat.
- Mignon du Preez (SA) scored the second highest score by a South African player in women's ODI.

=== 3rd ODI ===
9 August
10:45 IST
(UTC+1)
Scorecard

South Africa; 260/6 (50 overs)	v	Ireland; 193 (45 overs)
Laura Wolvaardt 105 (125); Ciara Metcalfe 2/37 (10 overs)		Isobel Joyce 57 (61); Suné Luus 5/32 (10 overs)

South Africa won by 67 runs
The Village, Dublin
Umpires: Azam Baig (Ire) and Alan Neill (Ire)

- South Africa won the toss and elected to bat.
- Una Raymond-Hoey (Ire) and Lara Goodall (SA) made their ODI debuts.
- Laura Wolvaardt (SA) became the second youngest women cricketer and the youngest South African player (male or female) to score a century in international cricket.

=== 4th ODI ===
11 August
10:45 IST
(UTC+1)
Scorecard

South Africa; 143 (46.4 overs)	v	Ireland; 146/3 (36.1 overs)
Andrie Steyn 43 (86); Ciara Metcalfe 3/23 (8.4 overs)		Isobel Joyce 62* (71); Chloe Tryon 1/22 (10 overs)

Ireland won by 7 wickets
The Hills Cricket Club, Dublin
Umpires: Alan Neill (Ire) and Paul Reynolds (Ire)

- South Africa won the toss and elected to bat.
- This was Ireland's first women's ODI win against South Africa.
