= Bangladesh women's cricket team in Ireland in 2016 =

International cricket tour

	Ireland women	Bangladesh women
- Dates: 5 – 10 September 2016
Captains	Laura Delany	Jahanara Alam

One Day International series
- Results: Bangladesh women won the 3-match series 1–0
Most runs	Cecelia Joyce (72)	Sanjida Islam (33)
Most wickets	Amy Kenealy (4)	Rumana Ahmed (3)
- Player of the series: Rumana Ahmed (Bangladesh)

Twenty20 International series
- Results: Ireland women won the 2-match series 1–0
Most runs	Clare Shillington (26)	Farzana Hoque (24)
Most wickets	Lucy O'Reilly (2)	Khadija Tul Kubra (3)

The Bangladesh National Women's Cricket team toured Ireland in September 2016 to play One day internationals (ODI) and two T20Is (T20I) against the Irish side. All the matches were held at Bready Cricket Club in Tyrone.

The T20Is were held on 5 and 6 September, followed by the ODIs on 8 and 10 September. The Bangladesh side were without their regular captain Salma Khatun because of injury. A third ODI was added to the series, after the first match was washed out and the second also had to be abandoned due to rain.

== Squads ==
ODIs		T20Is	
Ireland	Bangladesh	Ireland	Bangladesh
Laura Delany (c); Kim Garth; Cecelia Joyce; Isobel Joyce; Shauna Kavanagh; Meg Kendal (wk); Amy Kenealy; Gaby Lewis; Robyn Lewis; Ciara Metcalfe; Lucy O'Reilly; Clare Shillington; Mary Waldron (wk)	Jahanara Alam (c); Ayasha Rahman (vc); Fahima Khatun; Farzana Hoque; Jannatul Ferdous; Khadija Tul Kubra; Lata Mondal; Nahida Akter; Nigar Sultana (wk); Panna Ghosh; Ritu Moni; Rumana Ahmed; Sanjida Islam; Suraiya Azmin; Shaila Sharmin; Sharmin Akhter	Laura Delany (c); Kim Garth; Jennifer Gray; Cecelia Joyce; Isobel Joyce; Shauna Kavanagh; Amy Kenealy; Gaby Lewis; Robyn Lewis; Ciara Metcalfe; Lucy O'Reilly; Clare Shillington; Mary Waldron (wk)	Jahanara Alam (c); Ayasha Rahman (vc); Fahima Khatun; Farzana Hoque; Jannatul Ferdous; Khadija Tul Kubra; Lata Mondal; Nahida Akter; Nigar Sultana (wk); Panna Ghosh; Ritu Moni; Rumana Ahmed; Sanjida Islam; Suraiya Azmin; Shaila Sharmin; Sharmin Akhter

== T20I series ==
=== 1st T20I ===
5 September
10:30
Scorecard

Ireland; 54/8 (10 overs)	v	Bangladesh; 48/6 (10 overs)
Clare Shillington 26 (18); Khadija Tul Kubra 3/5 (2 overs)		Farzana Hoque 24 (24); Lucy O'Reilly 2/5 (2 overs)

Ireland Women won by 6 runs
Bready Cricket Club, Magheramason, Bready
Umpires: Roland Black (IRE) and Alan Neill (IRE)

- Bangladesh Women won the toss and elected to field.
- Rain reduced the match to 10 overs per side.

=== 2nd T20I ===
6 September
10:30
Scorecard

Ireland	v	Bangladesh

Match abandoned
Bready Cricket Club, Magheramason, Bready
Umpires: Roland Black (IRE) and Alan Neill (IRE)

- No toss.
- Match was abandoned without a ball bowled due to rain.

== ODI Series ==
=== 1st ODI ===
8 September
10:30
Scorecard

Ireland	v	Bangladesh

Match abandoned
Bready Cricket Club, Magheramason, Bready
Umpires: Roland Black (IRE) and Noel Dunn (IRE)

- No toss.
- Match was abandoned without a ball bowled due to rain.

=== 2nd ODI ===
9 September
10:30
Scorecard

Ireland; 68/0 (18 overs)	v	Bangladesh
Cecelia Joyce 37*

No result
Shaw's Bridge Lower Ground, Belfast
Umpires: Alex Adams (IRE) and Philip Thompson (IRE)

- Bangladesh Women won the toss and elected to field.
- Rain reduced the match to 47 overs per side.
- ODI debut for Ireland Women is Meg Kendal. Due to rain match was abandoned after 18 Overs of Ireland's innings.

=== 3rd ODI ===
10 September
10:30
Scorecard

Bangladesh; 106 (40.1 overs)	v	Ireland; 96 (37.5 overs)
Sanjida Islam 33 (53); Amy Kenealy 4/32 (10 overs)		Cecelia Joyce 35 (77); Rumana Ahmed 3/20 (7.5 overs)

Bangladesh Women won by 10 runs
Shaw's Bridge Lower Ground, Belfast
Umpires: Charlie McElwee (IRE) and Alan Neill (IRE)

- Bangladesh Women won the toss and elected to bat.
- Rumana Ahmed took a hat-trick.
