= 2017 Women's Cricket World Cup Qualifier =

Cricket tournament

2017 Women's World Cup Qualifier
- Dates: 7 – 21 February 2017
- Administrator: ICC
- Cricket format: 50 overs (One Day International)
- Host: Sri Lanka
- Champions: India (1st title)
- Runners-up: South Africa
- Participants: 10
- Matches: 30
- Player of the series: (South Africa) Suné Luus
- Most runs: (Pakistan) Javeria Khan (299)
- Most wickets: (Pakistan) Nashra Sandhu (17)

The 2017 ICC Women's Cricket World Cup Qualifier was an international women's cricket tournament that was held in Colombo, Sri Lanka, from 7 to 21 February 2017. It was the final stage of the qualification process for the 2017 World Cup in England. The tournament was the fourth edition of the World Cup Qualifier, and the first to be held in Sri Lanka.

The final was contested between India and South Africa, with India winning by 1 wicket. Along with the two finalists, both Sri Lanka and Pakistan also qualified for the 2017 Women's Cricket World Cup. As well as the four qualifiers for the Cricket World Cup, Bangladesh and Ireland kept their ODI status until 2021 by virtue of them reaching the Super Six stage of the tournament.

== Participating teams ==
Ten teams participated – Bangladesh and Ireland qualified automatically by virtue of having One Day International (ODI) status, while the other eight teams included the bottom four teams of the 2014–16 ICC Women's Championship and the four winners of the regional qualifiers. The top four teams at the World Cup Qualifier qualified for the World Cup.

1. India (Bottom 4 of ICC Women's Championship)
2. South Africa (Bottom 4 of ICC Women's Championship)
3. Pakistan (Bottom 4 of ICC Women's Championship)
4. Sri Lanka (Bottom 4 of ICC Women's Championship)
5. Bangladesh (automatic qualification – ODI status)
6. Ireland (automatic qualification – ODI status)
7. Zimbabwe (Africa regional qualifier)
8. Thailand (Asia regional qualifier)
9. Papua New Guinea (East Asia-Pacific regional qualifier)
10. Scotland (Europe regional qualifier)

== Squads ==
The International Cricket Council (ICC) confirmed all the squads for the tournament on 24 January 2017.

Bangladesh	India	Ireland	Pakistan	Papua New Guinea
Rumana Ahmed (c); ~~Fahima Khatun~~; Fargana Hoque; Jahanara Alam; Khadija Tul Kubra; ~~Lata Mondal~~; Murshida Khatun; Nigar Sultana (wk); Panna Ghosh; Ritu Moni; Salma Khatun; Sanjida Islam; Shaila Sharmin; Sharmin Akhter; Sharmin Sultana; Suraiya Azmin	Mithali Raj (c); Ekta Bisht; Rajeshwari Gayakwad; ~~Jhulan Goswami~~; Mansi Joshi; Thirush Kamini; Harmanpreet Kaur; Veda Krishnamurthy; ~~Smriti Mandhana~~; Mona Meshram; Shikha Pandey; ~~Sukanya Parida~~; Poonam Yadav; Deepti Sharma; Devika Vaidya; Sushma Verma (wk); Soni Yadav	Laura Delany (c); Kim Garth; Cecelia Joyce; Isobel Joyce; Shauna Kavanagh; Meg Kendal; Amy Kenealy; Gaby Lewis; Robyn Lewis; Ciara Metcalfe; Louise McCarthy; Lucy O'Reilly; Clare Shillington; Mary Waldron	Sana Mir (c); Bismah Maroof (vc); Nain Abidi; Muneeba Ali; ~~Sidra Ameen~~; ~~Anam Amin~~; Aiman Anwer; Ghulam Fatima; Javeria Khan; Nahida Khan; ~~Sidra Nawaz (wk)~~; Aliya Riaz; Nashra Sandhu; Rabiya Shah; Maham Tariq; Sadia Yousuf; Ayesha Zafar	Pauke Siaka (c); Kaia Arua; Helen Buruka (wk); Veru Frank; Sibona Jimmy; Kopi John; Ravina Oa; Konio Oala; Norma Ovasuru; Hinamutawa Philip; Tanya Ruma; Brenda Tau; Mairi Tom
Scotland	South Africa	Sri Lanka	Thailand	Zimbabwe
Abbi Aitken (c); Kari Anderson (vc); Kathryn Bryce; Sarah Bryce; Priyanaz Chatterji; Kirstie Gordon; Samantha Haggo; Rachel Hawkins; Lorna Jack; Abtaha Maqsood; Katie McGill; Elizabeth Priddle; Olivia Rae; Fiona Urquhart	Dane van Niekerk (c); Trisha Chetty (wk); Moseline Daniels; Mignon du Preez; Yolani Fourie; Lara Goodall; Shabnim Ismail; Marizanne Kapp; Ayabonga Khaka; Lizelle Lee; Marcia Letsoalo; Suné Luus; Chloe Tryon; Laura Wolvaardt	Inoka Ranaweera (c); Inoshi Priyadharshani; Nipuni Hansika; Chamari Athapaththu; Eshani Lokusuriyage; Sugandika Kumari; Chamari Polgampola; Hasini Perera; Udeshika Prabodhani; Harshitha Samarawickrama; Malsha Shehani; Dilani Manodara; Prasadani Weerakkody; Sripali Weerakkody (wk)	Sornnarin Tippoch (c); Nattaya Boochatham; Naruemol Chaiwai (wk); Natthakan Chantam; Rosenan Kanoh; Nannapat Koncharoenkai (wk); Suleeporn Laomi; Soraya Lateh; Ratanaporn Padunglerd; Sirintra Saengsakaorat; Sainammin Saenya; Rattana Sangsoma; Shagufta Arwe; Chanida Sutthiruang	Sharne Mayers (c); Tasmeen Granger; Precious Marange; Esther Mbofana; Pellagia Mujaji; Modester Mupachikwa (wk); Anesu Mushangwe; Mary-Anne Musonda; Nomatter Mutasa; Ashley Ndiraya; Josephine Nkomo; Nonhlanhla Nyathi; Loreen Tshuma

Mona Meshram replaced Smriti Mandhana in India's squad after Mandhana was injured during a match in the 2016–17 Women's Big Bash League. Later, both Jhulan Goswami and Sukanya Parida were also ruled out of India's squad due to injury. They were replaced by Soni Yadav and Mansi Joshi respectively. Ahead of the tournament, Sidra Nawaz was ruled out of Pakistan's squad due to injury and was replaced by Rabiya Shah. Anam Amin and Sidra Ameen were also withdrawn from Pakistan's squad, being replaced by Sadia Yousuf and Muneeba Ali respectively. Bangladesh replaced Fahima Khatun and Lata Mondol with Shaila Sharmin and Murshida Khatun.

== Format ==
The ten teams at the tournament were initially divided into two groups of five. The top three teams from each group progressed to the Super Six stage, and also earned ODI status until the next World Cup. The top four teams from the Super Six stage qualified for the World Cup, although there was still be a final to determine the overall winner of the World Cup Qualifier. In December 2016 the International Cricket Council (ICC) announced the fixtures and format for the tournament.

== First round ==
=== Group A ===
Pos	Team	Pld	W	L	T	NR	Pts	NRR
1	India	4	4	0	0	0	8	3.245
2	Sri Lanka	4	3	1	0	0	6	0.733
3	Ireland	4	2	2	0	0	4	−0.530
4	Zimbabwe	4	1	3	0	0	2	−1.565
5	Thailand	4	0	4	0	0	0	−1.491

Qualified to Super Six stage

7 February 2017
Scorecard

India; 259/4 (50 overs)	v	Sri Lanka; 145/8 (50 overs)
Devika Vaidya 89 (103); Udeshika Prabodhani 2/56 (10 overs)		Hasini Perera 34 (75); Rajeshwari Gayakwad 2/19 (10 overs)

India Women won by 114 runs
P. Sara Oval, Colombo
Umpires: Claire Polosak (Aus) and Leslie Reifer (WI)
Player of the match: Devika Vaidya (Ind)

- India Women won the toss and elected to bat.
- Soni Yadav (Ind) and Malsha Shehani (SL) both made their WODI debuts.

7 February 2017
Scorecard

Ireland; 237/6 (50 overs)	v	Zimbabwe; 118 (37.5 overs)
Kim Garth 63 (114); Josephine Nkomo 2/46 (10 overs)		Ashley Ndiraya 35 (50); Kim Garth 3/24 (8 overs)

Ireland Women won by 119 runs
Mercantile Cricket Association Ground, Colombo
Umpires: Anil Chaudhary (Ind) and Jacqueline Williams (WI)
Player of the match: Kim Garth (Ire)

- Zimbabwe Women won the toss and elected to field.

8 February 2017
Scorecard

Sri Lanka; 239/8 (50 overs)	v	Ireland; 93 (36.1 overs)
Prasadani Weerakkody 61 (81); Isobel Joyce 4/39 (10 overs)		Clare Shillington 36* (37); Inoshi Priyadharshani 3/21 (10 overs)

Sri Lanka Women won by 146 runs
Nondescripts Cricket Club Ground, Colombo
Umpires: Kathy Cross (NZ) and Ian Ramage (Sco)
Player of the match: Inoshi Priyadharshani (SL)

- Sri Lanka Women won the toss and elected to bat.
- Robyn Lewis (Ire) made her WODI debut.

8 February 2017
Scorecard

Thailand; 55 (29.1 overs)	v	India; 59/1 (12.4 overs)
Chanida Sutthiruang 12 (23); Mansi Joshi 3/4 (5 overs)		Thirush Kamini 24* (44); Sornnarin Tippoch 1/16 (4 overs)

India Women won by 9 wickets
Colombo Cricket Club Ground, Colombo
Umpires: Mark Hawthorne (Ire) and Jacqueline Williams (WI)
Player of the match: Mansi Joshi (Ind)

- Thailand Women won the toss and elected to bat.
- This was Thailand's first 50-over match.

10 February 2017
Scorecard

India; 250/2 (50 overs)	v	Ireland; 125 (49.1 overs)
Thirush Kamini 113* (146); Kim Garth 1/38 (10 overs)		Gaby Lewis 33 (70); Poonam Yadav 3/30 (10 overs)

India Women won by 125 runs
P. Sara Oval, Colombo
Umpires: Ian Ramage (Sco) and Sue Redfern (Eng)
Player of the match: Thirush Kamini (Ind)

- India Women won the toss and elected to bat.
- Mansi Joshi (Ind) made her WODI debut.

10 February 2017
Scorecard

Zimbabwe; 191/8 (50 overs)	v	Thailand; 155 (47.3 overs)
Mary-Anne Musonda 35 (53); Chanida Sutthiruang 2/57 (10 overs)		Sornnarin Tippoch 50 (92); Nomatter Mutasa 4/28 (8.3 overs)

Zimbabwe Women won by 36 runs
Mercantile Cricket Association Ground, Colombo
Umpires: Mark Hawthorne (Ire) and Claire Polosak (Aus)
Player of the match: Precious Marange (Zim)

- Thailand Women won the toss and elected to field.

11 February 2017
Scorecard

Zimbabwe; 149 (50 overs)	v	Sri Lanka; 153/2 (36.5 overs)
Mary-Anne Musonda 32 (73); Inoka Ranaweera 4/18 (10 overs)		Chamari Athapaththu 58 (60); Loreen Tshuma 2/31 (10 overs)

Sri Lanka Women won by 8 wickets
Nondescripts Cricket Club Ground, Colombo
Umpires: Mark Hawthorne (Ire) and Sue Redfern (Eng)
Player of the match: Inoka Ranaweera (SL)

- Zimbabwe Women won the toss and elected to bat.

11 February 2017
Scorecard

Ireland; 218/7 (50 overs)	v	Thailand; 172/9 (50 overs)
Kim Garth 98 (122); Ratanaporn Padunglerd 2/25 (5 overs)		Nattaya Boochatham 44 (84); Lucy O'Reilly 3/28 (10 overs)

Ireland Women won by 46 runs
Colombo Cricket Club Ground, Colombo
Umpires: Kathy Cross (NZ) and Leslie Reifer
Player of the match: Kim Garth (Ire)

- Ireland Women won the toss and elected to bat.

13 February 2017
Scorecard

Zimbabwe; 60 (28.5 overs)	v	India; 61/1 (9 overs)
Mary-Anne Musonda 26 (60); Poonam Yadav 5/19 (7.5 overs)		Veda Krishnamurthy 29 (16); Precious Marange 1/21 (4 overs)

India Women won by 9 wickets
P. Sara Oval, Colombo
Umpires: Kathy Cross (NZ) and Ian Ramage (Sco)
Player of the match: Poonam Yadav (Ind)

- Zimbabwe Women won the toss and elected to bat.

13 February 2017
Scorecard

Thailand; 122/8 (50 overs)	v	Sri Lanka; 123/3 (34.4 overs)
Nattaya Boochatham 50 (97); Eshani Lokusuriyage 2/15 (6 overs)		Chamari Polgampola 49 (94); Sainammin Saenya 1/1 (0.4 overs)

Sri Lanka Women won by 7 wickets
Mercantile Cricket Association Ground, Colombo
Umpires: Mark Hawthorne (Ire) and Sue Redfern (Eng)
Player of the match: Chamari Polgampola (SL)

- Thailand Women won the toss and elected to bat.

=== Group B ===
Pos	Team	Pld	W	L	T	NR	Pts	NRR
1	South Africa	4	4	0	0	0	8	2.168
2	Pakistan	4	3	1	0	0	6	1.725
3	Bangladesh	4	2	2	0	0	4	0.074
4	Scotland	4	1	3	0	0	2	−0.956
5	Papua New Guinea	4	0	4	0	0	0	−2.623

Qualified to Super Six stage

7 February 2017
Scorecard

South Africa; 258/9 (50 overs)	v	Pakistan; 195/6 (50 overs)
Chloe Tryon 79 (69); Nashra Sandhu 3/51 (10 overs)		Nain Abidi 62 (105); Dane van Niekerk 2/35 (7 overs)

South Africa Women won by 63 runs
Nondescripts Cricket Club Ground, Colombo
Umpires: Kathy Cross (NZ) and Raveendra Wimalasiri (SL)
Player of the match: Chloe Tryon (SA)

- South Africa Women won the toss and elected to bat.
- Ghulam Fatima and Nashra Sandhu (Pak) both made their WODI debuts.

7 February 2017
Scorecard

Bangladesh; 215/6 (50 overs)	v	Papua New Guinea; 97 (32.1 overs)
Sharmin Akhter 56 (86); Ravina Oa 2/23 (10 overs)		Pauke Siaka 32 (41); Rumana Ahmed 2/13 (7 overs)

Bangladesh Women won by 118 runs
Colombo Cricket Club Ground, Colombo
Umpires: Ian Ramage (Sco) and Sue Redfern (Eng)

- Bangladesh Women won the toss and elected to bat.

8 February 2017
Scorecard

Pakistan; 227 (50 overs)	v	Bangladesh; 160 (49.3 overs)
Rabiya Shah 34 (33); Rumana Ahmed 3/40 (10 overs)		Nigar Sultana 41 (72); Ghulam Fatima 3/28 (9.3 overs)

Pakistan Women won by 67 runs
P. Sara Oval, Colombo
Umpires: Claire Polosak (Aus) and Raveendra Wimalasiri
Player of the match: Ghulam Fatima (Pak)

- Pakistan Women won the toss and elected to bat.
- Aiman Anwer (Pak) made her WODI debut.
- Sana Mir became the first Pakistan woman to take 100 wickets in WODIs.

8 February 2017
Scorecard

Scotland; 142 (50 overs)	v	South Africa; 143/4 (33.1 overs)
Kari Anderson 50 (119); Shabnim Ismail 3/30 (10 overs)		Chloe Tryon 45* (40); Kirstie Gordon 45 (40)

South Africa Women won by 6 wickets
Mercantile Cricket Association Ground, Colombo
Umpires: Sue Redfern (Eng) and Leslie Reifer (WI)
Player of the match: Ayabonga Khaka (SA)

- Scotland Women won the toss and elected to bat.

10 February 2017
Scorecard

Pakistan; 276/5 (50 overs)	v	Papua New Guinea; 40 (24.5 overs)
Ayesha Zafar 115 (98); Pauke Siaka 2/34 (10 overs)		Konio Oala 14 (50); Nashra Sandhu 5/11 (6 overs)

Pakistan Women won by 236 runs
Nondescripts Cricket Club Ground, Colombo
Umpires: Leslie Reifer (WI) and Jacqueline Williams (WI)
Player of the match: Ayesha Zafar (Pak)

- Pakistan Women won the toss and elected to bat.

10 February 2017
Scorecard

Scotland; 140 (49.1 overs)	v	Bangladesh; 143/3 (37.3 overs)
Kari Anderson 28 (57); Khadija Tul Kubra 3/31 (10 overs)		Farzana Hoque 53* (109); Rachel Hawkins 1/27 (6.3 overs)

Bangladesh Women won by 7 wickets
Colombo Cricket Club Ground, Colombo
Umpires: Anil Chaudhary (Ind) and Kathy Cross (NZ)
Player of the match: Rumana Ahmed (Ban)

- Scotland Women won the toss and elected to bat.

11 February 2017
Scorecard

Bangladesh; 100 (46.5 overs)	v	South Africa; 101/4 (25.2 overs)
Rumana Ahmed 39 (93); Shabnim Ismail 3/14 (9 overs)		Lizelle Lee 34 (32); Salma Khatun 1/14 (4 overs)

South Africa Women won by 6 wickets
P. Sara Oval, Colombo
Umpires: Anil Chaudhary (Ind) and Jacqueline Williams (WI)
Player of the match: Shabnim Ismail (SA)

- Bangladesh Women won the toss and elected to bat.
- Suraiya Azmin (Ban) made her WODI debut.

11 February 2017
Scorecard

Scotland; 169 (50 overs)	v	Papua New Guinea; 162 (50 overs)
Rachel Hawkins 35 (60); Pauke Siaka 6/19 (7 overs)		Brenda Tau 46 (122); Kari Anderson 3/35 (10 overs)

Scotland Women won by 7 runs
Mercantile Cricket Association Ground, Colombo
Umpires: Claire Polosak (Aus) and Raveendra Wimalasiri (SL)
Player of the match: Kari Anderson (Sco)

- Papua New Guinea Women won the toss and elected to field.

13 February 2017
Scorecard

Papua New Guinea; 76 (32.4 overs)	v	South Africa; 77/0 (13.5 overs)
Brenda Tau 30 (68); Suné Luus 2/13 (5 overs)		Laura Wolvaardt 43* (52)

South Africa Women won by 10 wickets
Nondescripts Cricket Club Ground, Colombo
Umpires: Anil Chaudhary (Ind) and Claire Polosak (Aus)
Player of the match: Shabnim Ismail (SA)

- Papua New Guinea Women won the toss and elected to bat.

13 February 2017
Scorecard

Scotland; 91 (39.1 overs)	v	Pakistan; 94/4 (27.1 overs)
Kathryn Bryce 15 (42); Sana Mir 5/14 (10 overs)		Javeria Khan 35* (43); Kirstie Gordon 4/29 (10 overs)

Pakistan Women won by 6 wickets
Colombo Cricket Club Ground, Colombo
Umpires: Jacqueline Williams (WI) and Raveendra Wimalasiri (SL)
Player of the match: Sana Mir (Pak)

- Scotland Women won the toss and elected to bat.

== Super Six stage ==
Pos	Team	Pld	W	L	T	NR	Pts	NRR
1	India	5	5	0	0	0	10	1.981
2	South Africa	5	4	1	0	0	8	0.953
3	Sri Lanka	5	3	2	0	0	6	0.146
4	Pakistan	5	2	3	0	0	4	−0.150
5	Bangladesh	5	1	4	0	0	2	−1.127
6	Ireland	5	0	5	0	0	0	−2.013

Qualified to 2017 Women's Cricket World Cup
Retained ODI status until 2021.

15 February 2017
Scorecard

India; 205/7 (50 overs)	v	South Africa; 156 (46.4 overs)
Mithali Raj 64 (85); Marizanne Kapp 2/23 (10 overs)		Trisha Chetty 52 (81); Shikha Pandey 4/34 (9.4 overs)

India Women won by 49 runs
P. Sara Oval, Colombo
Umpires: Kathy Cross (NZ) and Raveendra Wimalasiri (SL)
Player of the match: Mithali Raj (Ind)

- South Africa Women won the toss and elected to field.
- Mithali Raj (Ind) became the second player to make 5,500 runs in WODIs.
- Dane van Niekerk (SA) became the seventh player to reach 1,000 runs and take 100 wickets in WODIs. She also became the first player for South Africa to take 100 wickets in WODIs.

15 February 2017
Scorecard

Pakistan; 212/7 (50 overs)	v	Sri Lanka; 216/5 (47.4 overs)
Nahida Khan 64 (92); Inoka Ranaweera 2/33 (8 overs)		Eshani Lokusuriyage 65* (75); Ghulam Fatima 2/28 (6 overs)

Sri Lanka Women won by 3 wickets
Nondescripts Cricket Club Ground, Colombo
Umpires: Anil Chaudhary (Ind) and Sue Redfern (Eng)
Player of the match: Eshani Lokusuriyage (SL)

- Sri Lanka Women won the toss and elected to field.

15 February 2017
Scorecard

Ireland; 144 (47.1 overs)	v	Bangladesh; 145/3 (39.1 overs)
Clare Shillington 37 (36); Jahanara Alam 3/21 (9 overs)		Sharmin Akhter 52 (86); Gaby Lewis 1/31 (6.1 overs)

Bangladesh Women won by 7 wickets
Colombo Cricket Club Ground, Colombo
Umpires: Leslie Reifer (WI) and Jacqueline Williams (WI)
Player of the match: Jahanara Alam (Ban)

- Bangladesh Women won the toss and elected to field.

17 February 2017
Scorecard

Sri Lanka; 142/9 (50 overs)	v	South Africa; 145/1 (36.1 overs)
Nipuni Hansika 48 (96); Suné Luus 3/40 (10 overs)		Suné Luus 50* (70); Eshani Lokusuriyage 1/15 (3 overs)

South Africa Women won by 9 wickets
P. Sara Oval, Colombo
Umpires: Claire Polosak (Aus) and Ian Ramage (Sco)
Player of the match: Suné Luus (SA)

- Sri Lanka Women won the toss and elected to bat.

17 February 2017
Scorecard

Bangladesh; 155/8 (50 overs)	v	India; 158/1 (33.3 overs)
Fargana Hoque 50 (107); Mansi Joshi 3/25 (10 overs)		Mona Meshram 78* (125); Khadija Tul Kubra 1/37 (8.3 over)

India Women won by 9 wickets
Nondescripts Cricket Club Ground, Colombo
Umpires: Mark Hawthorne (Ire) and Raveendra Wimalasiri (SL)
Player of the match: Mona Meshram (Ind)

- India Women won the toss and elected to field.

17 February 2017
Scorecard

Pakistan; 271/5 (50 overs)	v	Ireland; 185 (48.5 overs)
Javeria Khan 90* (104); Gaby Lewis 2/62 (overs)		Cecelia Joyce 41 (64); Sana Mir 2/32 (9.5 overs)

Pakistan Women won by 86 runs
Colombo Cricket Club Ground, Colombo
Umpires: Anil Chaudhary (Ind) and Kathy Cross (NZ)
Player of the match: Javeria Khan (Pak)

- Pakistan Women won the toss and elected to bat.

19 February 2017
Scorecard

Pakistan; 67 (43.4 overs)	v	India; 70/3 (22.3 overs)
Ayesha Zafar 19 (33); Ekta Bisht 5/8 (10 overs)		Deepti Sharma 29* (73); Sadia Yousuf 2/19 (8 overs)

India Women won by 7 wickets
P. Sara Oval, Colombo
Umpires: Claire Polosak (Aus) and Raveendra Wimalasiri (SL)
Player of the match: Ekta Bisht (Ind)

- India Women won the toss and elected to field.

19 February 2017
Scorecard

Sri Lanka; 197/9 (50 overs)	v	Bangladesh; 68/5 (21 overs)
Chamari Athapaththu 84 (114); Salma Khatun 3/18 (9 overs)		Nigar Sultana 24 (51); Udeshika Prabodhani 2/14 (4 overs)

Sri Lanka Women won by 42 runs (DLS method)
Nondescripts Cricket Club Ground, Colombo
Umpires: Mark Hawthorne (Ire) and Jacqueline Williams (WI)
Player of the match: Chamari Athapaththu (SL)

- Bangladesh Women won the toss and elected to field.

19 February 2017
Scorecard

Ireland; 166 (49.5 overs)	v	South Africa; 82/1 (21 overs)
Mary Waldron 33* (41); Lizelle Lee 2/12 (5.5 overs)		Laura Wolvaardt 32* (61); Kim Garth 1/35 (6 overs)

South Africa Women won by 36 runs (DLS method)
Colombo Cricket Club Ground, Colombo
Umpires: Ian Ramage (Sco) and Leslie Reifer (WI)

- Ireland Women won the toss and elected to bat.

== Final ==
21 February 2017
Scorecard

South Africa; 244 (49.4 overs)	v	India; 245/9 (50 overs)
Mignon du Preez 40 (72); Rajeshwari Gayakwad 3/51 (9 overs)		Deepti Sharma 71 (89); Marizanne Kapp 2/36 (10 overs)

India Women won by 1 wicket
P. Sara Oval, Colombo
Umpires: Kathy Cross (NZ) and Claire Polosak (Aus)
Player of the match: Deepti Sharma (Ind)

- South Africa Women won the toss and elected to bat.
- This was India's highest successful run-chase in a WODI.

== See also ==
- 2012 ICC Women's World Twenty20, the most recent ICC women's tournament to be held in Sri Lanka
