= New Zealand women's cricket team in Ireland in 2018 =

International cricket tour

	Ireland women	New Zealand women
- Dates: 6 – 13 June 2018
Captains	Laura Delany	Suzie Bates (Note: Amy Satterthwaite captained New Zealand Women for the second WODI.)

One Day International series
- Results: New Zealand women won the 3-match series 3–0
Most runs	Laura Delany (75)	Amelia Kerr (342)
Most wickets	Lara Maritz (6)	Amelia Kerr (8)
- Player of the series: Amelia Kerr (NZ)

Twenty20 International series
- Results: New Zealand women won the 1-match series 1–0
Most runs	Gaby Lewis (61)	Jess Watkin (77)
Most wickets	n/a	Leigh Kasperek (3)

The New Zealand women's cricket team played the Ireland women's cricket team in June 2018. The tour consisted of one Women's Twenty20 International (WT20I) and three Women's One Day Internationals (WODIs) matches. New Zealand won the one-off WT20I match by ten wickets.

In the first WODI match of the series, New Zealand set a new record for the highest innings total, scoring 490/4 in their 50 overs. At the time it was the highest score in either a men's or women's ODI match. This broke the previous record, also held by New Zealand, of 455/5 against Pakistan in 1997.

In the third WODI match, Amelia Kerr of New Zealand made the highest individual score in a WODI match, and became the youngest cricketer, male or female, to score a double century in One Day International cricket, when she scored 232 not out. New Zealand went on to win the WODI series 3–0, scoring 400 or more runs in three consecutive matches, becoming the first team in men's or women's ODIs to do so. Kerr finished the WODI series as the leading run-scorer and wicket-taker, and was named the player of the series.

== Squads ==
WODIs		WT20Is	
Ireland	New Zealand	Ireland	New Zealand
Laura Delany (c); Rachel Delaney; Kim Garth; Jennifer Gray; Cecelia Joyce; Isobel Joyce; Shauna Kavanagh; Amy Kenealy; Gaby Lewis; Louise Little; Lara Maritz; Cara Murray; Una Raymond-Hoey; Mary Waldron (wk)	Suzie Bates (c); Bernadine Bezuidenhout (wk); Sophie Devine; Kate Ebrahim; Maddy Green; Holly Huddleston; Hayley Jensen; Leigh Kasperek; Amelia Kerr; Katey Martin; Anna Peterson; Hannah Rowe; Amy Satterthwaite; Lea Tahuhu; Jess Watkin	Laura Delany (c); Rachel Delaney; Kim Garth; Cecelia Joyce; Isobel Joyce; Shauna Kavanagh; Amy Kenealy; Gaby Lewis; Lara Maritz; Cara Murray; Clare Shillington; Mary Waldron (wk)	Suzie Bates (c); Bernadine Bezuidenhout (wk); Sophie Devine; Kate Ebrahim; Maddy Green; Holly Huddleston; Hayley Jensen; Leigh Kasperek; Amelia Kerr; Katey Martin; Anna Peterson; Hannah Rowe; Amy Satterthwaite; Lea Tahuhu; Jess Watkin

== WT20I series ==
=== Only WT20I ===
6 June 2018
16:00 (D/N)
Scorecard

Ireland; 136/8 (20 overs)	v	New Zealand; 142/0 (11 overs)
Gaby Lewis 61 (45); Leigh Kasperek 3/25 (4 overs)		Jess Watkin 77* (38)

New Zealand Women won by 10 wickets
YMCA Cricket Club, Dublin
Umpires: Azam Baig (Ire) and Alan Neill (Ire)

- Ireland Women won the toss and elected to bat.
- Rachel Delaney, Lara Maritz, Cara Murray (Ire) and Jess Watkin (NZ) all made their WT20I debuts.
- Bernadine Bezuidenhout (NZ) made her WT20I debut for New Zealand, after previously playing for South Africa.
- Bernadine Bezuidenhout (NZ) equalled the record for the most dismissals by a wicket-keeper in WT20Is (5).
- Suzie Bates and Jess Watkin made the highest partnership for New Zealand Women and the fifth-largest partnership for any team in W2T0Is.

== WODI series ==
=== 1st WODI ===
8 June 2018
11:30
Scorecard

New Zealand; 491/4 (50 overs)	v	Ireland; 144 (35.3 overs)
Suzie Bates 151 (94); Cara Murray 2/119 (10 overs)		Laura Delany 37 (65); Leigh Kasperek 4/17 (2.3 overs)

New Zealand Women won by 347 runs
YMCA Cricket Club, Dublin
Umpires: Azam Baig (Ire) and Alan Neill (Ire)

- New Zealand Women won the toss and elected to bat.
- Cara Murray (Ire) and Jess Watkin (NZ) both made their WODI debuts.
- Suzie Bates and Maddy Green (NZ) scored their tenth and first centuries in WODIs respectively.
- Suzie Bates also became the leading run-scorer for New Zealand Women in WODIs, passing Debbie Hockley's total of 4,064 runs.
- Cara Murray (Ire) returned the worst bowling figures in WODIs.
- New Zealand Women set a new record for the highest innings total in WODIs.

=== 2nd WODI ===
10 June 2018
11:30
Scorecard

New Zealand; 418 (49.5 overs)	v	Ireland; 112 (35.3 overs)
Sophie Devine 108 (61); Lara Maritz 4/58 (8.5 overs)		Laura Delany 33 (70); Anna Peterson 2/12 (4 overs)

New Zealand Women won by 306 runs
The Hills Cricket Club, Dublin
Umpires: Roland Black (Ire) and Michael Foster (Ire)

- New Zealand Women won the toss and elected to bat.

=== 3rd WODI ===
13 June 2018
11:30
Scorecard

New Zealand; 440/3 (50 overs)	v	Ireland; 135 (44 overs)
Amelia Kerr 232* (145); Gaby Lewis 1/81 (9 overs)		Una Raymond-Hoey 42 (68); Amelia Kerr 5/17 (7 overs)

New Zealand Women won by 305 runs
Clontarf Cricket Club, Dublin
Umpires: Jareth McCready (Ire) and Paul Reynolds (Ire)

- New Zealand Women won the toss and elected to bat.
- Amelia Kerr (NZ) made the highest individual score in WODIs, and became the youngest cricketer, male or female, to score a double century in One Day International cricket.
- Leigh Kasperek (NZ) scored her first century in WODIs.
- Amelia Kerr and Leigh Kasperek's partnership of 295 runs was the highest for the second wicket in WODIs.
- Amelia Kerr also took her first five-wicket haul in WODIs.
