= 2017 South Africa Women's Quadrangular Series =

International cricket tournament

- Dates: 4 – 21 May 2017
- Administrator: ICC
- Cricket format: 50 overs
- Host: South Africa
- Champions: India
- Participants: 4
- Matches: 14
- Player of the series: (India) Deepti Sharma
- Most runs: (India) Deepti Sharma (347)
- Most wickets: (South Africa) Shabnim Ismail (17)

The 2017 South Africa Women's Quadrangular Series was an international women's cricket tournament that was held in Potchefstroom, South Africa, from 4 to 21 May 2017. The series was contested between the teams of India, Ireland, South Africa and Zimbabwe. The matches were played at Senwes Park and The PUK Oval. All the matches were played as Women's One Day International (WODI) matches, except for fixtures that featured Zimbabwe, who do not have WODI status.

Ahead of the tournament, South Africa's captain Dane van Niekerk was ruled out of the tournament due to a foot injury. South Africa named an interim captain, but they did not add a replacement to their squad.

India won the tournament, beating South Africa by eight wickets in the final.

== Squads ==
India	Ireland	South Africa	Zimbabwe
Mithali Raj (c); Ekta Bisht; Rajeshwari Gayakwad; Jhulan Goswami; Mansi Joshi; Harmanpreet Kaur; Veda Krishnamurthy; Mona Meshram; Shikha Pandey; Poonam Yadav; Nuzhat Parween; Poonam Raut; Deepti Sharma; Devika Vaidya; Sushma Verma (wk)	Laura Delany (c); Aoife Beggs; Laura Boylan; Rachel Delaney; Jennifer Gray; Shauna Kavanagh; Amy Kenealy; Gaby Lewis; Louise Little; Lara Maritz; Sophie MacMahon; Lucy O'Reilly; Leah Paul; Rebecca Stokell; Mary Waldron	~~Dane van Niekerk (c)~~; Suné Luus (c); Trisha Chetty (wk); Moseline Daniels; Nadine de Klerk; Mignon du Preez; Shabnim Ismail; Marizanne Kapp; Ayabonga Khaka; Masabata Klaas; Lizelle Lee; Raisibe Ntozakhe; Andrie Steyn; Chloe Tryon; Laura Wolvaardt	Sharne Mayers (c); Precious Marange; Chiedza Dhururu; Tasmeen Granger; Audrey Mazvishaya; Esther Mbofana; Chipo Mugeri; Pellagia Mujaji; Modester Mupachikwa; Anesu Mushangwe; Nomatter Mutasa; Josephine Nkomo; Nomvelo Sibanda; Loreen Tshuma

== Points table ==
Pos	Team	Pld	W	L	T	NR	BP	Pts	NRR
1	India	6	5	1	0	0	4	24	2.693
2	South Africa	6	5	1	0	0	4	24	2.117
3	Zimbabwe	6	2	4	0	0	0	8	−1.854
4	Ireland	6	0	6	0	0	0	0	−2.687

== Fixtures ==
=== Warm-up matches ===
4 May 2017
Scorecard

Ireland; 157/8 (50 overs)	v	South Africa; 158/2 (27.2 overs)
Laura Delany 67 (101); Marizanne Kapp 2/11 (5 overs)		Laura Wolvaardt 57* (74); Shauna Kavanagh 2/20 (4 overs)

South Africa Women won by 8 wickets
North West University No 2 Ground, Potchefstroom
Umpires: Adrian Holdstock (SA) and Thomas Mokorosi (SA)

- Ireland Women won the toss and elected to bat.

4 May 2017
Scorecard

Zimbabwe; 106 (41 overs)	v	India; 107/4 (19.5 overs)
Chipo Mugeri 46 (112); Shikha Pandey 5/20 (7 overs)		Deepti Sharma 29 (43); Esther Mbofana 2/23 (5 overs)

India Women won by 6 wickets
Witrand Cricket Field, Potchefstroom
Umpires: Arno Jacobs (SA) and Bongani Jele (SA)

- Zimbabwe Women won the toss and elected to bat.
- India reached their target by 19.5 overs, but the match continued with India being bowled out for 291 runs in the final over.

=== Round-robin stage ===
7 May 2017
Scorecard

Zimbabwe; 78 (26.5 overs)	v	South Africa; 79/2 (11.4 overs)
Sharne Mayers 24 (29); Shabnim Ismail 5/25 (8.5 overs)		Laura Wolvaardt 28 (31); Nomatter Mutasa 1/27 (5 overs)

South Africa Women won by 8 wickets
Senwes Park, Potchefstroom
Umpires: Bongani Jele (SA) and Thomas Mokorosi (SA)
Player of the match: Shabnim Ismail (SA)

- Zimbabwe Women won the toss and elected to bat.

7 May 2017
Scorecard

Ireland; 96 (44.4 overs)	v	India; 99/0 (18.4 overs)
Jennifer Gray 24 (38); Deepti Sharma 3/20 (7.4 overs)		Deepti Sharma 51* (47)

India Women won by 10 wickets
PUK Oval, Potchefstroom
Umpires: Adrian Holdstock (SA) and Arno Jacobs (SA)
Player of the match: Deepti Sharma (Ind)

- India Women won the toss and elected to field.
- Aoife Beggs, Rachel Delaney, Lara Maritz and Leah Paul (Ire) all made their WODI debuts.

9 May 2017
Scorecard

South Africa; 119 (39.3 overs)	v	India; 121/3 (41.1 overs)
Mignon du Preez 31 (57); Jhulan Goswami 3/20 (7.3 overs)		Mithali Raj 51* (65); Shabnim Ismail 2/17 (8 overs)

India Women won by 7 wickets
PUK Oval, Potchefstroom
Umpires: Adrian Holdstock (SA) and Arno Jacobs (SA)
Player of the match: Shikha Pandey (Ind)

- India Women won the toss and elected to field.
- Nadine de Klerk and Raisibe Ntozakhe (SA) both made their WODI debuts.
- Jhulan Goswami (Ind) became the highest wicket-taker in WODIs.

9 May 2017
Scorecard

Ireland; 209 (46.1 overs)	v	Zimbabwe; 211/4 (47 overs)
Shauna Kavanagh 53 (63); Precious Marange 4/32 (8.1 overs)		Mary-Anne Musonda 65* (90); Rachel Delaney 2/21 (10 overs)

Zimbabwe Women won by 6 wickets
Senwes Park, Potchefstroom
Umpires: Bongani Jele (SA) and Thomas Mokorosi (SA)
Player of the match: Mary-Anne Musonda (Zim)

- Zimbabwe Women won the toss and elected to field.

11 May 2017
Scorecard

South Africa; 337/5 (50 overs)	v	Ireland; 159/8 (50 overs)
Laura Wolvaardt 149 (149); Aoife Beggs 3/64 (10 overs)		Mary Waldron 35 (96); Suné Luus 2/27 (10 overs)

South Africa Women won by 178 runs
Senwes Park, Potchefstroom
Umpires: Adrian Holdstock (SA) and Thomas Mokorosi (SA)
Player of the match: Laura Wolvaardt (SA)

- South Africa Women won the toss and elected to bat.
- Louise Little and Rebecca Stokell (Ire) both made their WODI debuts.
- Laura Delany (Ire) played in her 100th international match.
- This was South Africa Women's highest total in WODIs.

11 May 2017
Scorecard

Zimbabwe; 93 (38.4 overs)	v	India; 94/1 (18.3 overs)
Precious Marange 17 (13); Rajeshwari Gayakwad 3/25 (9 overs)		Mona Meshram 46* (53); Josephine Nkomo 1/41 (9 overs)

India Women won by 9 wickets
PUK Oval, Potchefstroom
Umpires: Arno Jacobs (SA) and Bongani Jele (SA)
Player of the match: Rajeshwari Gayakwad (Ind)

- Zimbabwe Women won the toss and elected to bat.

15 May 2017
Scorecard

Zimbabwe; 113 (40.2 overs)	v	South Africa; 114/3 (21.2 overs)
Modester Mupachikwa 29 (49); Shabnim Ismail 4/14 (7.2 overs)		Andrie Steyn 22 (27); Nomvelo Sibanda 1/10 (1 over)

South Africa Women won by 7 wickets
PUK Oval, Potchefstroom
Umpires: Arno Jacobs (SA) and Bongani Jele (SA)
Player of the match: Shabnim Ismail (SA)

- Zimbabwe Women won the toss and elected to bat.

15 May 2017
Scorecard

India; 358/3 (50 overs)	v	Ireland; 109 (40 overs)
Deepti Sharma 188 (160); Rachel Delaney 1/44 (7 overs)		Mary Waldron 35 (71); Rajeshwari Gayakwad 4/18 (8 overs)

India Women won by 249 runs
Senwes Park, Potchefstroom
Umpires: Adrian Holdstock (SA) and Thomas Mokorosi (SA)
Player of the match: Deepti Sharma (Ind)

- India Women won the toss and elected to bat.
- Nuzhat Parween (Ind) and Sophie MacMahon (Ire) both made their WODI debuts.
- Deepti Sharma and Poonam Raut (Ind) both scored their first centuries in a WODI.
- Deepti Sharma and Poonam Raut made the highest partnership for any wicket in a WODI (320).
- Deepti Sharma made the second-highest score in a WODI and hit the most fours in an innings (27).

17 May 2017
Scorecard

South Africa; 269/5 (50 overs)	v	India; 261/9 (50 overs)
Andrie Steyn 83 (134); Ekta Bisht 2/47 (10 overs)		Deepti Sharma 71 (71); Shabnim Ismail 3/54 (10 overs)

South Africa Women won by 8 runs
Senwes Park, Potchefstroom
Umpires: Bongani Jele (SA) and Thomas Mokorosi (SA)
Player of the match: Chloe Tryon (SA)

- India Women won the toss and elected to field.

17 May 2017
Scorecard

Ireland; 150 (45 overs)	v	Zimbabwe; 154/5 (41 overs)
Lara Maritz 26* (34); Tasmeen Granger 4/24 (10 overs)		Chipo Mugeri 42 (89); Leah Paul 1/14 (2 overs)

Zimbabwe Women won by 5 wickets
PUK Oval, Potchefstroom
Umpires: Adrian Holdstock (SA) and Arno Jacobs (SA)
Player of the match: Tasmeen Granger (Zim)

- Ireland Women won the toss and elected to bat.

19 May 2017
Scorecard

South Africa; 323/8 (50 overs)	v	Ireland; 203/6 (50 overs)
Andrie Steyn 117 (123); Rachel Delaney 3/70 (10 overs)		Mary Waldron 41 (52); Ayabonga Khaka 3/15 (5 overs)

South Africa Women won by 120 runs
PUK Oval, Potchefstroom
Umpires: Adrian Holdstock (SA) and Arno Jacobs (SA)
Player of the match: Andrie Steyn (SA)

- South Africa Women won the toss and elected to bat.
- Andrie Steyn (SA) scored her first century in a WODI.

19 May 2017
Scorecard

Zimbabwe; 98 (42.3 overs)	v	India; 99/0 (16 overs)
Chipo Mugeri 34 (60); Poonam Yadav 4/11 (9.3 overs)		Veda Krishnamurthy 50* (51)

India Women won by 10 wickets
Senwes Park, Potchefstroom
Umpires: Bongani Jele (SA) and Thomas Mokorosi (SA)
Player of the match: Deepti Sharma (Ind)

- Zimbabwe Women won the toss and elected to bat.

== Finals ==
3rd-place Playoff
21 May 2017
Scorecard

Ireland; 254/5 (50 overs)	v	Zimbabwe; 235 (49.4 overs)
Laura Delany 81 (86); Loreen Tshuma 2/27 (7 overs)		Chipo Mugeri 57 (99); Aoife Beggs 5/52 (10 overs)

Ireland Women won by 19 runs
PUK Oval, Potchefstroom
Umpires: Arno Jacobs (SA) and Thomas Mokorosi (SA)
Player of the match: Aoife Beggs (Ire)

- Ireland Women won the toss and elected to bat.

Final
21 May 2017
Scorecard

South Africa; 156 (40.2 overs)	v	India; 160/2 (33 overs)
Suné Luus 55 (74); Jhulan Goswami 3/22 (8 overs)		Poonam Raut 70* (92); Marizanne Kapp 1/22 (7 overs)

India Women won by 8 wickets
Senwes Park, Potchefstroom
Umpires: Adrian Holdstock (SA) and Bongani Jele (SA)
Player of the match: Poonam Raut (Ind)

- India Women won the toss and elected to field.
