= West Indies women's cricket team in Ireland in 2019 =

International cricket tour

	Ireland women	West Indies women
- Dates: 26 – 29 May 2019
Captains	Laura Delany (Note: Kim Garth captained Ireland in the second and third WT20Is.)	Stafanie Taylor

Twenty20 International series
- Results: West Indies women won the 3-match series 3–0
Most runs	Kim Garth (142)	Hayley Matthews (143)
Most wickets	Kim Garth (4)	Afy Fletcher (6)
- Player of the series: Hayley Matthews (WI)

The West Indies women's cricket team toured Ireland to play the Ireland women's cricket team in May 2019. The tour consisted of three Women's Twenty20 Internationals (WT20Is), which took place directly before the West Indies women's team toured England. The West Indies won the series 3–0.

Ahead of the series, Cricket Ireland awarded part-time professional contracts to six of its players. Ireland's captain, Laura Delany, suffered an injury during the first match which ruled her out of the rest of the series. Kim Garth was named as Ireland's captain in her place.

== Squads ==
WT20Is
Ireland	West Indies
Laura Delany (c); Kim Garth; Shauna Kavanagh; Anna Kerrison; Gaby Lewis; Louise Little; Sophie MacMahon; Lara Maritz; Naomi Matthews; Leah Paul; Celeste Raack; Una Raymond-Hoey; Rebecca Stokell; Mary Waldron	Stafanie Taylor (c); Hayley Matthews (vc); Shemaine Campbelle; Shamilia Connell; Britney Cooper; ~~Deandra Dottin~~; Afy Fletcher; Chinelle Henry; Stacy-Ann King; Kycia Knight; Kyshona Knight; Natasha McLean; Chedean Nation; Karishma Ramharack; Shakera Selman

Reniece Boyce, Shanika Bruce, Britney Cooper, Shabika Gajnabi, Sheneta Grimmond and Shawnisha Hector were also named as reserve players for the West Indies. Ahead of the tour, Deandra Dottin was ruled out of the West Indies' squad due to injury, and was replaced by Britney Cooper. Anna Kerrison was added to Ireland's squad for the last two matches.

== WT20I series ==
=== 1st WT20I ===
26 May 2019
14:00
Scorecard

West Indies; 139/4 (20 overs)	v	Ireland; 75 (18.4 overs)
Stafanie Taylor 75 (53); Celeste Raack 1/16 (4 overs)		Kim Garth 45 (55); Afy Fletcher 4/14 (3.4 overs)

West Indies Women by 64 runs
YMCA Cricket Club, Dublin
Umpires: Azam Baig (Ire) and Paul Reynolds (Ire)

- West Indies Women won the toss and elected to bat.
- Louise Little, Sophie MacMahon, Una Raymond-Hoey and Rebecca Stokell (Ire) all made their WT20I debuts.

=== 2nd WT20I ===
28 May 2019
16:00 (D/N)
Scorecard

West Indies; 157/6 (20 overs)	v	Ireland; 112/6 (20 overs)
Stacy-Ann King 34 (45); Kim Garth 3/22 (4 overs)		Kim Garth 51* (48); Stacy-Ann King 2/15 (4 overs)

West Indies Women won by 45 runs
Sydney Parade, Dublin
Umpires: Mark Hawthorne (Ire) and Philip Thompson (Ire)

- West Indies Women won the toss and elected to bat.
- Anna Kerrison (Ire) made her WT20I debut.

=== 3rd WT20I ===
29 May 2019
16:00 (D/N)
Scorecard

West Indies; 188/1 (20 overs)	v	Ireland; 116/3 (20 overs)
Hayley Matthews 107* (62); Sophie MacMahon 1/36 (4 overs)		Mary Waldron 55* (62); Stafanie Taylor 2/19 (3 overs)

West Indies Women won by 72 runs
Sydney Parade, Dublin
Umpires: Azam Baig (Ire) and Mark Hawthorne (Ire)

- Ireland Women won the toss and elected to field.
- Hayley Matthews (WI) scored her first century in WT20Is.
