= 2020 Women's Super Series =

- Dates: 3 August – 27 September 2020
- Administrator: Cricket Ireland
- Cricket format: 50 over
- Tournament format: League
- Champions: Typhoons (1st title)
- Participants: 2
- Matches: 8
- Most runs: Leah Paul (295)
- Most wickets: Celeste Raack (12)

The 2020 Women's Super Series was the sixth Women's Super Series competition that took place in Ireland. The tournament was originally scheduled to take place in May and June with 3 teams taking part, but was delayed and restructured due to the COVID-19 pandemic. The tournament eventually took place in August and September, with two teams taking part (Scorchers and Typhoons, with Dragons leaving the competition) and eight 50 over matches taking place. Typhoons won the tournament, achieving their first Super Series title.

== Competition format ==
The two teams played eight 50 over matches against each other in a league system.

The league worked on a points system with positions being based on the total points. Points were awarded as follows:

Win: 2 points.
Tie: 1 point.
Loss: 0 points.
Abandoned/No Result: 1 point.

== Squads ==
| Scorchers | Typhoons |
|---|---|
| Gaby Lewis (Captain); Alana Dalzell; Jennifer Hanna; Shauna Kavanagh; Anna Kerrison; Maria Kerrison; Hannah Little; Sophie MacMahon; Tess Maritz; Caoimhe McCann; Louise McCarthy; Kate McEvoy; Cara Murray; Leah Paul; Jenny Sparrow; Sarah White | Laura Delany (Captain); Ava Canning; Sarah Condron; Zara Craig; Rachel Delaney; Georgina Dempsey; Sarah Forbes; Rebecca Gough; Amy Hunter; Louise Little; Jane Maguire; Mya Naughton; Cliodhna O'Reardon; Orla Prendergast; Celeste Raack; Freya Sargent; Rebecca Stokell |

Source: Cricket Ireland

== Points table ==
| Team | Pld | W | L | T | NR | A | Pts | NRR |
|---|---|---|---|---|---|---|---|---|
| Typhoons (C) | 8 | 4 | 4 | 0 | 0 | 0 | 8 | 0.189 |
| Scorchers | 8 | 4 | 4 | 0 | 0 | 0 | 8 | –0.189 |

Source: CricketArchive

== Fixtures ==
3 August 2020
Scorecard

| Scorchers; 219/7 (50 overs) | v | Typhoons; 223/3 (45.5 overs) |
| Gaby Lewis 74 (106); Laura Delany 2/19 (4 overs) | | Laura Delany 68* (96); Sophie MacMahon 1/34 (8.5 overs) |

Typhoons won by 7 wickets
Oak Hill Cricket Club Ground, Kilbride, County Wicklow
Umpires: Paul Reynolds and Steve Wood

- Typhoons won the toss and elected to field.

9 August 2020
Scorecard

| Typhoons; 181 (42.2 overs) | v | Scorchers; 183/2 (35.5 overs) |
| Rachel Delaney 64 (66); Anna Kerrison 4/17 (9 overs) | | Sophie MacMahon 66* (66); Laura Delany 1/23 (8 overs) |

Scorchers won by 8 wickets
Sydney Parade, Dublin
Umpires: Paul Reynolds and Steve Wood

- Scorchers won the toss and elected to field.

16 August 2020
Scorecard

| Scorchers; 259 (49.5 overs) | v | Typhoons; 236/8 (50 overs) |
| Leah Paul 48 (64); Louise Little 5/42 (9.5 overs) | | Rebecca Gough 46 (57); Kate McEvoy 3/36 (10 overs) |

Scorchers won by 23 runs
Oak Hill Cricket Club Ground, Kilbride, County Wicklow
Umpires: Paul Reynolds and Steve Wood

- Typhoons won the toss and elected to field.

23 August 2020
Scorecard

| Scorchers; 177 (39 overs) | v | Typhoons; 106 (35.5 overs) |
| Gaby Lewis 95 (109); Georgina Dempsey 3/21 (7 overs) | | Rebecca Stokell 31 (52); Leah Paul 4/21 (8 overs) |

Scorchers won by 71 runs
Oak Hill Cricket Club Ground, Kilbride, County Wicklow
Umpires: Aidan Seaver and Paul Reynolds

- Scorchers won the toss and elected to bat.

6 September 2020
Scorecard

| Typhoons; 177 (47 overs) | v | Scorchers; 124 (35.4 overs) |
| Amy Hunter 54 (110); Louise McCarthy 2/21 (10 overs) | | Leah Paul 48 (85); Orla Prendergast 3/36 (8 overs) |

Typhoons won by 53 runs
Oak Hill Cricket Club Ground, Kilbride, County Wicklow
Umpires: Aidan Seaver and Paul Reynolds

- Typhoons won the toss and elected to bat.

13 September 2020
Scorecard

| Scorchers; 222/8 (50 overs) | v | Typhoons; 192 (48.3 overs) |
| Shauna Kavanagh 69* (98); Celeste Raack 3/33 (10 overs) | | Laura Delany 62 (86); Sophie MacMahon 5/41 (9 overs) |

Scorchers won by 30 runs
Oak Hill Cricket Club Ground, Kilbride, County Wicklow
Umpires: Azam Baig and Paul Reynolds

- Scorchers won the toss and elected to bat.

20 September 2020
Scorecard

| Scorchers; 63 (25.2 overs) | v | Typhoons; 66/2 (14.4 overs) |
| Sophie MacMahon 15 (50); Orla Prendergast 4/10 (4 overs) | | Sarah Forbes 28* (42); Jennifer Hanna 1/6 (2 overs) |

Typhoons won by 8 wickets
Anglesea Road Cricket Ground, Dublin
Umpires: Paul Reynolds and Steve Wood

- Typhoons won the toss and elected to field.

27 September 2020
Scorecard

| Scorchers; 235/6 (50 overs) | v | Typhoons; 239/3 (41.5 overs) |
| Leah Paul 81* (124); Orla Prendergast 1/15 (10 overs) | | Rebecca Stokell 67 (83); Leah Paul 2/49 (10 overs) |

Typhoons won by 7 wickets
Malahide Cricket Club Ground, Malahide
Umpires: Paul Reynolds and Steve Wood

- Scorchers won the toss and elected to bat.

== Statistics ==
=== Most runs ===
| Player | Team | Matches | Innings | Runs | Average | HS | 100s | 50s |
|---|---|---|---|---|---|---|---|---|
| Leah Paul | Scorchers | 7 | 7 | 295 | 49.16 | 81* | 0 | 2 |
| Gaby Lewis | Scorchers | 7 | 7 | 249 | 35.57 | 95 | 0 | 2 |
| Rebecca Stokell | Typhoons | 7 | 7 | 244 | 34.85 | 67 | 0 | 1 |
| Laura Delany | Typhoons | 8 | 8 | 219 | 43.80 | 68* | 0 | 2 |
| Shauna Kavanagh | Scorchers | 8 | 8 | 183 | 30.50 | 69* | 0 | 1 |

Source: CricketArchive

=== Most wickets ===
| Player | Team | Overs | Wickets | Average | BBI | 5w |
|---|---|---|---|---|---|---|
| Celeste Raack | Typhoons | 62.0 | 12 | 17.00 | 3/29 | 0 |
| Sophie MacMahon | Scorchers | 55.3 | 11 | 21.45 | 5/41 | 1 |
| Orla Prendergast | Typhoons | 52.0 | 10 | 18.10 | 4/10 | 0 |
| Georgina Dempsey | Typhoons | 39.0 | 8 | 20.50 | 3/21 | 0 |
| Louise Little | Typhoons | 43.4 | 8 | 21.25 | 5/42 | 1 |

Source: CricketArchive
