= Valmai Gee =

Irish cricketer

Personal information
- Full name: Valmai Gee
- Born: 8 April 1971 (age 55); Cochabamba, Bolivia
- Batting: Right-handed
- Role: Wicket-keeper

International information
- National side: Ireland (2009)
- Only ODI (cap 60): 5 August 2009 v Netherlands
- Only T20I (cap 15): 6 August 2009 v Netherlands

Domestic team information
- Years: Team
- 2015: Dragons

Career statistics
Competition	WODI	WT20I	WLA	WT20
Matches	1	1	5	6
Runs scored	–	–	25	47
Batting average	–	–	8.33	15.66
100s/50s	–	–	0/0	0/0
Top score	–	–	15	35
Balls bowled	–	–	6	5
Wickets	–	–	0	0
Bowling average	–	–	–	–
5 wickets in innings	–	–	0	0
10 wickets in match	–	–	0	0
Best bowling	–	–	–	–
Catches/stumpings	0/0	1/2	1/0	2/2
- Source: CricketArchive, 28 May 2021

Valmai Gee (born 8 April 1971) is an Irish former cricketer who played as a wicket-keeper. She appeared in one One Day International and one Twenty20 International for Ireland in 2009. She played in the 2015 Women's Super 3s for Dragons.

== Career ==
Gee played for Ireland in the 2009 Women's European Cricket Championship. She made her only Women's ODI appearance against The Netherlands, and did not bat in the match. In the same tournament, she made her only Women's Twenty20 International appearance, again not batting in the match, and played in two other matches in the tournament, both against Scotland. Gee had previously played a Twenty20 match for Ireland against Nottinghamshire in the 2009 RSA T20 Cup. She was selected to play for Ireland in the 2009 Women's County Championship. She played in a match against Northumberland. In 2011, she also played in a Championship game against Cumbria. In 2015, she represented the Dragons team in the Women's Super 3s.

Aside from her playing career, Gee is a Level I coach. She has coached at a Washington Cricket League youth camp and for the United States Youth Cricket Association.

== Awards ==
Playing for Leinster, she has won the Sandra Dawson award for Irish Division 1 wicket-keeper of the season multiple times.
