= List of Ireland women ODI cricketers =

This is a list of Irish women's One-day international cricketers. Ireland Women played their first ODI on 28 June 1987, in a three-match series against Australia. Overall, 100 women have played for Ireland in at least one women's one-day international. A One Day International, or an ODI, is an international cricket match between two representative teams, each having ODI status. An ODI differs from test matches in that the number of overs per team is limited, and that each team has only one innings. The list is arranged in the order in which each player won her first ODI cap. Where more than one player won her first ODI cap in the same match, those players are listed alphabetically by surname.

== Key ==
General

- † – Wicket-keeper
- First – Year of debut
- Last – Year of latest game
- Mat – Number of matches played

Batting

- Runs – Runs scored in career
- HS – Highest score
- Avg – Average runs scored per dismissal
- 50s – Number of half centuries
- 100 – Centuries scored
- * – Batsman remained not out

Bowling

- Balls – Balls bowled in career
- Wkt – Wickets taken in career
- BBI – Best bowling in an innings
- Ave – Average runs conceded per wicket

Fielding

- Ca – Catches taken
- St – Stumpings taken

== Players ==
Statistics are correct as of 6 September 2026.

Ireland Women ODI cricketers
Cap	Name	First	Last	Mat	Batting					Bowling				Fielding		Ref
Cap	Name	First	Last	Mat	Runs	HS	Avg	50	100	Balls	Wkt	BBI	Ave	Ca	St	Ref
1	Donna Armstrong	1987	1991	20	118	24	6.94	0	0	—	—	—	—	0	0	
2	Susan Bray	1987	1996	34	29	15*	2.63	0	0	2,068	35	5/27	21.22	4	0	
3	Grainne Clancy	1987	1988	12	22	10	3.66	0	0	600	5	2/40	65.80	4	0	
4	Miriam Grealey	1987	2005	79	1,412	101	23.14	5	1	2,805	38	2/5	44.71	13	0	
5	Rachel Hardiman	1987	1991	9	35	9	5.83	0	0	222	3	2/14	46.00	4	0	
6	Mary-Pat Moore	1987	1996	37	854	114*	25.11	3	1	760	13	3/16	31.53	5	0	
7	Anne Murray	1987	1990	21	491	61	24.55	3	0	—	—	—	—	2	0	
8	Elizabeth Owens	1987	1995	35	358	40	11.54	0	0	1,948	29	3/24	34.93	7	0	
9	Sonia Reamsbottom	1987	1993	19	395	60	20.78	1	0	—	—	—	—	5	0	
10	Alice Stanton	1987	1990	3	0	0	0.00	0	0	—	—	—	—	0	0	
11	Pamela Trohear	1987	1987	2	10	9	5.00	0	0	—	—	—	—	0	0	
12	Stella Owens	1987	1993	24	479	84*	20.82	3	0	516	7	3/31	42.28	2	0	
13	Anne-Marie Garth	1988	1989	12	14	4*	4.66	0	0	606	6	2/18	54.83	0	0	
14	Collette McGuiness	1988	1989	4	12	4*	6.00	0	0	—	—	—	—	0	0	
15	Gwynneth Smith	1988	1988	8	60	22	8.57	0	0	57	1	1/23	35.00	1	0	
16	Julie Logue†	1988	1996	19	106	28*	11.77	0	0	96	3	3/33	31.00	5	4	
17	Janice Walsh	1988	1993	14	69	17	5.75	0	0	—	—	—	—	3	0	
18	Helen Hearnden†	1988	1989	3	5	4*	—	0	0	—	—	—	—	3	1	
19	Anne Linehan	1989	2008	60	699	74	14.26	3	0	300	5	2/28	38.60	18	9	
20	Judith Herbison	1990	1997	25	75	20	6.81	0	0	1434	21	3/29	34.90	1	0	
21	Terri Bennett	1990	1990	3	23	12*	11.50	0	0	36	0	—	—	0	0	
22	Gillian McCall	1990	1990	2	9	5	9.00	0	0	12	0	—	—	0	0	
23	Saibh Young	1990	2001	36	196	16	8.90	0	0	1,380	32	4/24	28.62	7	0	
24	Nikki Squire	1991	2001	37	291	30	10.77	0	0	—	—	—	—	5	0	
25	Sandra Dawson†	1993	2000	24	52	13*	7.42	0	0	—	—	—	—	10	5	
26	Catherine O'Neill	1993	2003	41	438	45	16.84	0	0	2,176	45	4/10	22.84	6	0	
27	Marguerite Burke	1993	2000	4	24	24	24.00	0	0	—	—	—	—	0	0	
28	Barbara McDonald	1993	2005	57	106	22*	4.41	0	0	2,876	54	4/8	26.75	10	0	
29	Shona Seawright	1995	1996	7	59	30	14.75	0	0	—	—	—	—	0	0	
30	Caitriona Beggs	1995	2008	61	1,217	78*	24.83	7	0	146	3	1/7	81.33	11	0	
31	Clare O'Leary	1996	2003	37	570	53*	18.38	1	0	—	—	—	—	7	0	
32	Adele Spence	1996	1997	8	27	18*	6.75	0	0	233	5	3/4	35.60	1	0	
33	Grainne Leahy	1997	2001	11	55	17	5.50	0	0	—	—	—	—	3	0	
34	Davina Pratt	1997	2002	8	19	8*	4.75	0	0	208	3	2/41	58.33	2	0	
35	Cliodhna Sharp	1997	2000	9	49	19	7.00	0	0	—	—	—	—	0	0	
36	Clare Shillington	1997	2017	90	1,276	95*	17.72	6	0	746	20	3/34	20.60	30	0	
37	Heather Whelan	1997	2010	39	102	13	5.66	0	0	1,847	31	3/14	38.61	5	0	
38	Tracey Skoyles	1997	1998	5	23	7*	7.66	0	0	—	—	—	—	2	0	
39	Isobel Joyce	1999	2018	79	995	67*	17.15	4	0	3,118	66	4/20	30.45	23	0	
40	Lara Molins	1999	2001	7	13	8	2.60	0	0	168	6	2/5	14.33	2	0	
41	Ciara Metcalfe	1999	2017	53	127	16	4.09	0	0	2,381	60	5/18	27.00	11	0	
42	Karen Young	2000	2003	19	289	120	17.00	1	0	198	3	1/15	46.00	2	0	
43	Aoife Budd	2000	2001	4	10	4*	5.00	0	0	24	0	—	—	1	0	
44	Cecelia Joyce	2001	2018	57	1,172	78*	23.44	3	0	130	1	1/12	135.00	11	0	
45	Marianne Herbert	2002	2009	15	26	9	3.71	0	0	456	7	2/20	53.14	2	0	
46	Laura Morgan	2002	2002	1	0	0	0.00	0	0	—	—	—	—	0	0	
47	Nicola Coffey	2003	2008	19	180	43	11.25	0	0	207	4	1/23	48.75	2	0	
48	Emma Beamish	2003	2010	18	131	40	8.18	0	0	—	—	—	—	4	0	
49	Una Budd	2003	2005	8	79	33*	13.16	0	0	—	—	—	—	0	0	
50	Jo Day†	2004	2006	6	7	4*	7.00	0	0	—	—	—	—	5	1	
51	Jill Whelan	2004	2011	29	332	39*	16.60	0	0	1,228	29	3/7	27.24	11	0	
52	Jillian Smythe	2005	2006	7	39	21	6.50	0	0	104	0	—	—	0	0	
53	Eimear Richardson	2005	2023	34	466	50*	15.53	1	0	1,279	26	5/13	30.30	3	0	
54	Elaine Nolan	2006	2008	4	0	0	0.00	0	0	126	1	1/17	81.00	0	0	
55	Jean Carroll†	2007	2009	8	6	4*	1.20	0	0	—	—	—	—	3	7	
56	Amy Kenealy	2008	2018	23	104	21*	6.11	0	0	672	16	4/32	38.06	4	0	
57	Melissa Scott-Hayward	2008	2014	26	219	23	9.52	0	0	224	3	1/27	65.66	10	0	
58	Joanne McKinley	2008	2008	1	3	3	3.00	0	0	12	0	—	—	0	0	
59	Suzanne Kenealy	2008	2010	4	5	4	2.50	0	0	84	0	—	—	0	0	
60	Valmai Gee†	2009	2009	1	—	—	—	—	—	—	—	—	—	0	0	
61	Laura Delany‡	2010	2025	75	1,411	109	23.13	5	1	1,800	31	3/26	46.12	12	0	
62	Kim Garth (Note: Kim Garth also played One Day International matches for Australia. Only her record for Ireland is given above.)	2010	2018	33	448	72*	17.92	0	0	1,044	23	4/11	33.91	12	1	
63	Mary Waldron†	2010	2023	56	481	42	13.00	0	0	—	—	—	—	33	16	
64	Louise McCarthy	2010	2017	28	75	15	4.68	0	0	1,130	17	4/18	48.05	4	0	
65	Nikki Symmons	2010	2010	4	15	6	3.75	0	0	—	—	—	—	1	0	
66	Laura Cullen	2011	2012	6	18	9	6.00	0	0	180	7	3/51	20.42	0	0	
67	Emma Flanagan	2011	2014	9	32	12	4.00	0	0	—	—	—	—	1	0	
68	Shauna Kavanagh	2011	2022	27	206	34	10.84	0	0	129	1	1/29	140.00	16	0	
69	Rebecca Rolfe	2011	2014	8	9	4	1.28	0	0	—	—	—	—	0	0	
70	Julie van der Flier	2011	2011	1	0	0*	—	0	0	—	—	—	—	0	0	
71	Laura Boylan	2011	2017	4	57	25*	19.00	0	0	60	2	2/37	47.50	1	0	
72	Elena Tice	2011	2014	15	14	3	1.55	0	0	501	8	3/31	47.50	3	0	
73	Lucy O'Reilly	2013	2017	14	44	14	4.40	0	0	416	8	2/65	42.87	9	0	
74	Jennifer Gray	2014	2018	9	140	35	17.50	0	0	54	3	3/40	14.00	1	0	
75	Cath Dalton	2016	2016	4	59	20	14.75	0	0	—	—	—	—	0	0	
76	Gaby Lewis‡	2016	2026	68	2,083	96*	33.06	17	0	659	10	2/41	71.50	22	0	
77	Una Raymond-Hoey	2016	2025	11	145	42	14.50	0	0	18	0	—	—	3	0	
78	Meg Kendal	2016	2017	6	79	26*	19.75	0	0	18	0	—	—	1	0	
79	Robyn Lewis	2017	2017	2	2	2	1.00	0	0	30	1	1/19	28.00	0	0	
80	Aoife Beggs	2017	2017	3	0	0*	0.00	0	0	132	5	3/64	26.00	0	0	
81	Lara Maritz	2017	2018	5	37	25	15.00	0	0	251	6	4/58	55.33	0	0	
82	Leah Paul	2017	2026	57	1,375	137	25.46	8	1	574	6	2/24	87.00	14	0	
83	Rachel Delaney	2017	2022	15	85	22*	8.50	0	0	463	13	3/20	33.07	6	0	
84	Louise Little	2017	2026	17	103	27	7.92	0	0	614	9	5/28	69.55	5	0	
85	Rebecca Stokell	2017	2026	29	468	57	20.34	3	0	—	—	—	—	2	0	
86	Sophie MacMahon	2017	2025	14	108	42	13.50	0	0	366	8	2/44	42.25	1	0	
87	Cara Murray	2018	2026	42	133	19	8.86	0	0	1,819	61	6/31	32.08	18	0	
88	Georgina Dempsey	2021	2026	22	126	45*	14.00	0	0	901	16	4/54	50.12	5	0	
89	Amy Hunter†	2021	2026	46	1488	121*	34.60	11	1	—	—	—	—	22	10	
90	Orla Prendergast	2021	2026	50	1330	122*	31.66	6	1	1353	30	3/25	37.96	25	0	
91	Celeste Raack	2021	2021	5	7	6	7.00	0	0	258	7	3/34	22.85	0	0	
92	Jane Maguire	2021	2026	27	94	28	6.26	0	0	1129	24	3/33	38.66	8	0	
93	Sarah Forbes	2022	2026	24	408	55	17.00	2	0	12	0	—	—	6	0	
94	Arlene Kelly	2022	2026	39	424	35	14.62	0	0	1,729	45	4/35	31.51	10	0	
95	Alana Dalzell	2022	2026	10	52	19	17.33	0	0	359	8	4/36	44.50	2	0	
96	Ava Canning	2023	2025	22	108	20	7.20	0	0	849	16	4/36	39.06	4	0	
97	Aimee Maguire	2023	2026	16	43	13	7.16	0	0	713	23	5/19	31.56	5	0	
98	Freya Sargent	2023	2025	16	36	16	9.00	0	0	756	19	3/29	39.57	5	0	
99	Alice Tector	2024	2026	8	82	29	10.25	0	0	150	2	1/49	84.00	3	0	
100	Christina Coulter Reilly†	2024	2025	10	207	80	23.00	1	0	—	—	—	—	5	2	
101	Kia McCartney	2025	2026	5	2	1*	1.00	0	0	222	5	2/45	50.00	0	0	
102	Lara McBride	2025	2026	4	4	2*	4.00	0	0	169	6	3/22	21.00	0	0	

== See also ==
- List of Ireland women Test cricketers
- List of Ireland women Twenty20 International cricketers
