= Matilda Lugg =

Australian cricketer

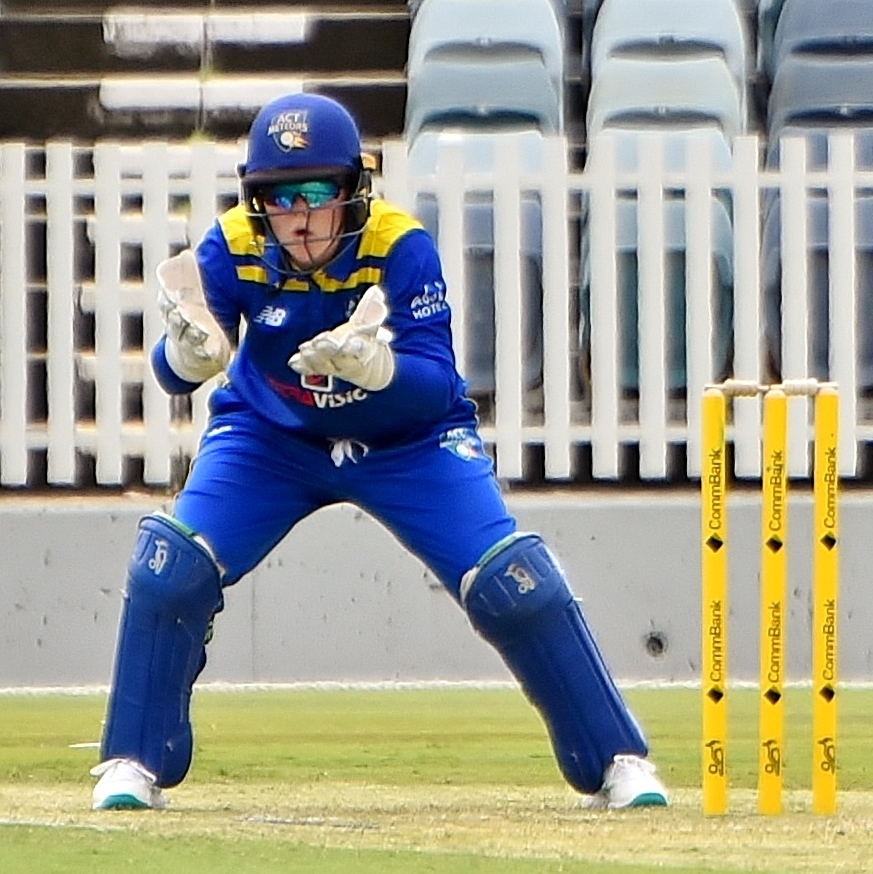
- Lugg playing for the ACT in September 2022

Personal information
- Full name: Matilda Bryant Lugg
- Born: 11 December 1999 (age 26); Moruya, New South Wales, Australia
- Batting: Right-handed
- Bowling: Right-arm medium
- Role: Wicket-keeper

Domestic team information
- Years: Team
- 2018: Typhoons
- 2018/19–2022/23: Australian Capital Territory
- 2021/22: Sydney Sixers

Career statistics
Competition	WLA	WT20
Matches	13	6
Runs scored	121	110
Batting average	10.08	22.00
100s/50s	0/0	0/0
Top score	24	29
Balls bowled	–	30
Wickets	–	2
Bowling average	–	15.00
5 wickets in innings	–	0
10 wickets in match	–	0
Best bowling	–	2/14
Catches/stumpings	6/2	2/1
- Source: CricketArchive, 23 February 2026

Matilda Bryant Lugg (born 12 November 1999) is an Australian former cricketer who played as a wicket-keeper and right-handed batter. She played for the ACT Meteors in the Women's National Cricket League (WNCL). She joined the Meteors ahead of the 2018–19 WNCL season but did not make an appearance.

Lugg made her debut for the Meteors during the 2019–20 WNCL season, making four appearances in total. She previously played for the Irish team Typhoons in the 2018 Toyota Super 3s.
