= Sasha Moloney =

Australian cricketer

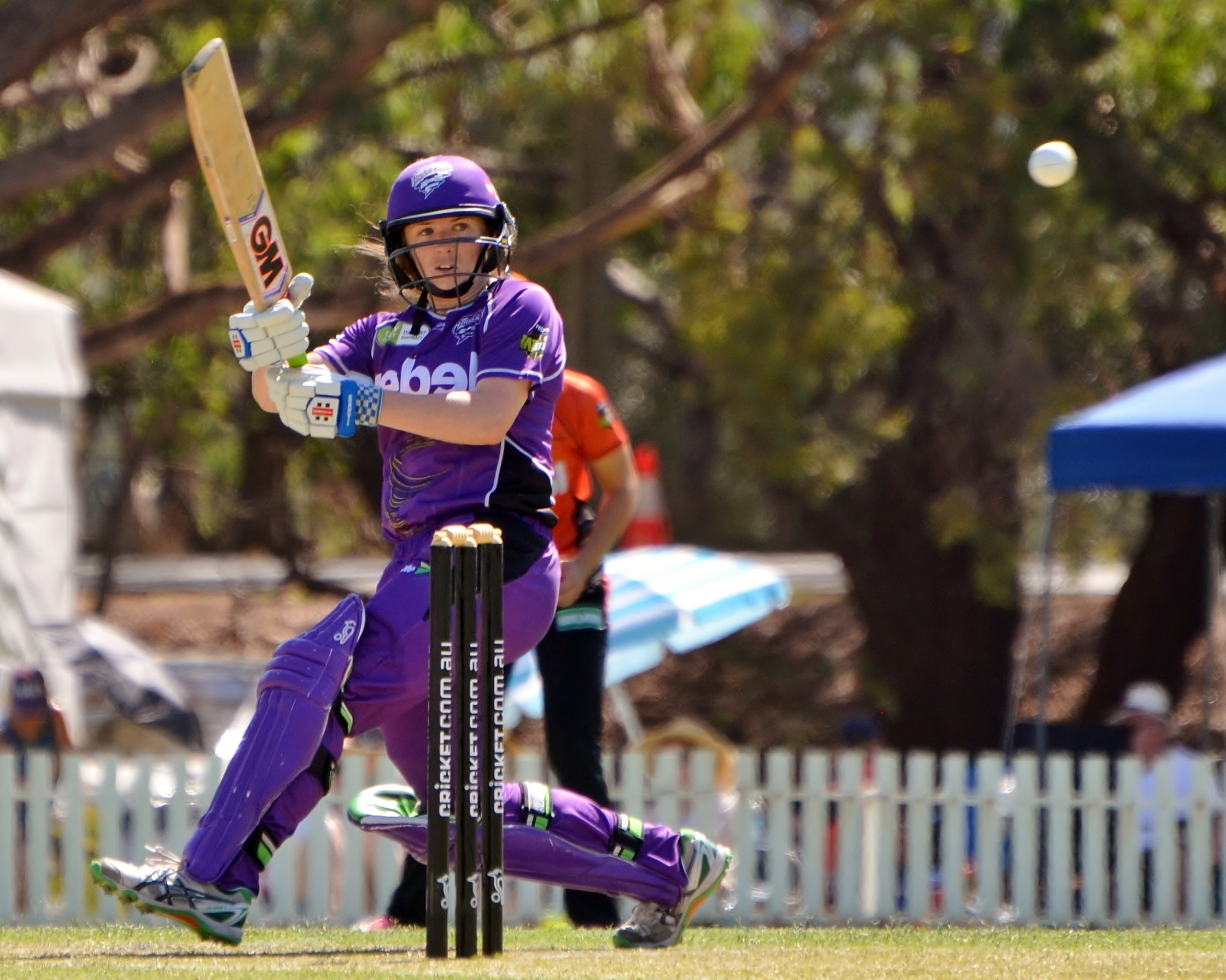
- Moloney batting for the Hobart Hurricanes, 2018

Personal information
- Full name: Sasha Kate Moloney
- Born: 14 June 1992 (age 34); Longford, Tasmania, Australia
- Batting: Right-handed
- Bowling: Right-arm off break
- Role: All-rounder

Domestic team information
- Years: Team
- 2012/13–2016/17: Tasmania
- 2015: Typhoons
- 2015/16–2021/22: Hobart Hurricanes (squad no. 99)
- 2018/19–present: Tasmania
- 2023/23–present: Melbourne Stars

Career statistics
Competition	WLA	WT20
Matches	71	122
Runs scored	678	647
Batting average	20.76	12.26
100s/50s	0/3	0/0
Top score	77*	39
Balls bowled	2,101	910
Wickets	53	46
Bowling average	29.74	23.96
5 wickets in innings	0	0
10 wickets in match	0	0
Best bowling	4/37	4/15
Catches/stumpings	8/0	16/1
- Source: CricketArchive, 21 March 2021

Sasha Kate Moloney (born 14 June 1992) is an Australian cricketer who plays as a right-handed batter and right-arm off break bowler for Tasmanian Tigers and Melbourne Stars. From May to August 2015, she played for Typhoons in Ireland's inaugural Women's Super 3s, a competition involving both 50 over and T20 matches. She has also played cricket in the Netherlands.

Moloney was a part of the Hurricanes squad for its inaugural WBBL|01 season (2015–16). She remained in the squad for the WBBL|02 season (2016–17).

Moloney's career has been marred by knee injuries. She missed the entire 2013–14 season due to a knee reconstruction, and suffered another knee injury during a WBBL match in December 2016.

In November 2018, she was named in the Hobart Hurricanes' squad where she was also named captain for the 2018–19 Women's Big Bash League season.
