= Aoife Beggs =

Irish cricketer (born 1999)

Personal information
- Full name: Aoife Beggs
- Born: 23 October 1999 (age 27); Dublin, Ireland
- Batting: Right-handed
- Bowling: Right-arm medium
- Role: Bowler

International information
- National side: Ireland (2017)
- ODI debut (cap 80): 7 May 2017 v India
- Last ODI: 19 May 2017 v South Africa

Domestic team information
- Years: Team
- 2015: Typhoons
- 2016–2017: Scorchers

Career statistics
Competition	WODI	WLA	WT20
Matches	3	9	3
Runs scored	0	24	–
Batting average	0.00	12.00	–
100s/50s	0/0	0/0	–
Top score	0*	14*	–
Balls bowled	132	216	36
Wickets	5	7	2
Bowling average	26.00	27.28	24.00
5 wickets in innings	0	0	0
10 wickets in match	0	0	0
Best bowling	3/64	3/64	1/9
Catches/stumpings	0/–	1/–	0/–
- Source: CricketArchive, 27 May 2021

Aoife Beggs (born 23 October 1999) is an Irish former cricketer who played as a right-arm medium bowler. She appeared in 3 One Day Internationals for Ireland, all in the 2017 South Africa Quadrangular Series. She played in the Women's Super Series for Typhoons and Scorchers.
