= Laura Boylan (cricketer) =

Irish cricketer (born 1991)

Personal information
- Full name: Laura Christina Boylan
- Born: 16 December 1991 (age 34); County Louth, Ireland
- Batting: Right-handed
- Bowling: Right-arm medium
- Role: All-rounder

International information
- National side: Ireland (2011–2017)
- ODI debut (cap 71): 17 August 2011 v Netherlands
- Last ODI: 19 May 2017 v South Africa
- T20I debut (cap 26): 15 August 2011 v Netherlands
- Last T20I: 20 August 2011 v Netherlands

Domestic team information
- Years: Team
- 2015–2017: Typhoons

Career statistics
Competition	WODI	WT20I	WLA	WT20
Matches	4	3	9	9
Runs scored	57	–	74	32
Batting average	19.00	–	18.50	8.00
100s/50s	0/0	–	0/0	0/0
Top score	25*	–	25*	14*
Balls bowled	60	–	114	30
Wickets	2	–	5	0
Bowling average	47.50	–	30.20	–
5 wickets in innings	0	–	0	0
10 wickets in match	0	–	0	0
Best bowling	2/37	–	2/17	–
Catches/stumpings	1/–	0/–	1/–	0/–
- Source: CricketArchive, 28 May 2021

Laura Boylan (born 16 December 1991) is an Irish former cricketer who played as a right-arm medium bowler and right-handed batter. She appeared in 4 One Day Internationals and 3 Twenty20 Internationals for Ireland between 2011 and 2017. She played in the Super 3s for Typhoons.
