= Hannah Little =

Irish cricketer (born 2001)

Personal information
- Born: 21 July 2001 (age 25)
- Batting: Right-handed
- Bowling: Right-arm medium
- Role: Bowler
- Relatives: Josh Little (brother); Louise Little (sister)

International information
- National side: Ireland (2019)
- T20I debut (cap 45): 29 June 2019 v Netherlands
- Last T20I: 13 August 2019 v Thailand

Domestic team information
- Years: Team
- 2015–2016: Typhoons
- 2015–2018: Dragons
- 2019–present: Scorchers

Career statistics
Competition	WT20I
Matches	4
Runs scored	2
Batting average	2.00
100s/50s	0/0
Top score	2
Balls bowled	36
Wickets	0
Bowling average	–
5 wickets in innings	0
10 wickets in match	0
Best bowling	–
Catches/stumpings	0/–
- Source: Cricinfo, 26 May 2021

Hannah Little (born 21 July 2001) is an Irish cricketer who plays for Scorchers and Ireland. In August 2019, she was named in the Irish Women's Twenty20 International (WT20I) squad for the 2019 Netherlands Women's Quadrangular Series. She made her WT20I debut for Ireland, against the Netherlands, on 8 August 2019. In July 2020, she was awarded a non-retainer contract by Cricket Ireland for the following year.
