= Hannah de Burgh Whyte =

Irish cricketer (born 1991)

Personal information
- Born: 7 September 1991 (age 35); Ireland
- Batting: Right-handed
- Role: Batter

International information
- National side: Ireland
- Only T20I (cap 27): 15 August 2011 v Netherlands

Domestic team information
- Years: Team
- 2015–2018: Scorchers

Career statistics
Competition	WT20I	WLA	WT20
Matches	1	8	13
Runs scored	–	89	49
Batting average	–	29.66	12.25
100s/50s	–	0/1	0/0
Top score	–	74	24
Balls bowled	–	36	60
Wickets	–	0	1
Bowling average	–	–	81.00
5 wickets in innings	–	0	0
10 wickets in match	–	0	0
Best bowling	–	–	1/30
Catches/stumpings	0/–	0/–	0/–
- Source: CricketArchive, 27 May 2021

Hannah de Burgh Whyte (born 7 September 1991) is an Irish cricketer. She has been part of the Ireland Women's Performance Squad, and played her first and only Women's Twenty20 International (WT20I) for Ireland, against the Netherlands, on 15 August 2011. She played in the Women's Super Series for Scorchers.
