= Lara Maritz =

South African-born Irish cricketer (born 2001)

Personal information
- Full name: Lara Maritz
- Born: 7 January 2001 (age 25); Pretoria, South Africa
- Batting: Right-handed
- Bowling: Right-arm medium
- Role: All-rounder

International information
- National side: Ireland (2017–present)
- ODI debut (cap 81): 7 May 2017 v India
- Last ODI: 13 June 2018 v New Zealand
- T20I debut (cap 35): 6 June 2018 v New Zealand
- Last T20I: 30 August 2021 v Netherlands

Domestic team information
- Years: Team
- 2015: Scorchers
- 2015–2019: Dragons
- 2021–present: Scorchers

Career statistics
Competition	WODI	WT20I
Matches	5	26
Runs scored	37	70
Batting average	7.40	7.77
100s/50s	0/0	0/0
Top score	25	16*
Balls bowled	251	354
Wickets	6	17
Bowling average	55.33	21.47
5 wickets in innings	0	0
10 wickets in match	0	0
Best bowling	4/58	3/4
Catches/stumpings	0/–	9/–
- Source: Cricinfo, 30 August 2021

Lara Maritz (born 7 January 2001) is a South African-born Irish cricketer. She made her Women's One Day International cricket (WODI) debut against India in the 2017 South Africa Quadrangular Series on 7 May 2017. She made her Women's Twenty20 International cricket (WT20I) debut for Ireland against New Zealand Women on 6 June 2018. She plays in the Women's Super Series for Scorchers.

In June 2018, she was named in Ireland's squad for the 2018 ICC Women's World Twenty20 Qualifier tournament. In October 2018, she was named in Ireland's squad for the 2018 ICC Women's World Twenty20 tournament in the West Indies. In August 2019, she was named in Ireland's squad for the 2019 ICC Women's World Twenty20 Qualifier tournament in Scotland. In October 2019, she was named in the Women's Global Development Squad, ahead of a five-match series in Australia. In July 2020, she was awarded a non-retainer contract by Cricket Ireland for the following year.

On 6 November 2026, more than five years after her last international appearance, Maritz was named in the Ireland squad for the ICC Emerging Nations Trophy in the United Arab Emirates later that month.
