= Rachel Delaney =

Irish cricketer (born 1997)

Personal information
- Full name: Rachel Delaney
- Born: 5 May 1997 (age 29); Dublin, Ireland
- Batting: Right-handed
- Bowling: Right-arm off break
- Role: All-rounder

International information
- National side: Ireland (2017–present)
- ODI debut (cap 83): 7 May 2017 v South Africa
- Last ODI: 9 November 2022 v Pakistan
- T20I debut (cap 37): 6 June 2018 v New Zealand
- Last T20I: 21 July 2022 v Australia

Domestic team information
- Years: Team
- 2015–2019: Dragons
- 2020–2021: Typhoons
- 2022: Scorchers

Career statistics
Competition	WODI	WT20I
Matches	12	10
Runs scored	57	40
Batting average	7.12	10.00
100s/50s	0/0	0/0
Top score	17*	12
Balls bowled	421	99
Wickets	12	3
Bowling average	32.50	37.66
5 wickets in innings	0	0
10 wickets in match	0	0
Best bowling	3/20	1/0
Catches/stumpings	6/–	1/–
- Source: Cricinfo, 29 November 2022

Rachel Delaney (born 5 May 1997) is an Irish cricketer who plays for Ireland. She made her Women's One Day International cricket (WODI) debut against India in the 2017 South Africa Quadrangular Series on 7 May 2017. She made her Women's Twenty20 International cricket (WT20I) debut for Ireland against New Zealand on 6 June 2018.
