= Meg Kendal =

Irish cricketer (born 1989)

Personal information
- Full name: Meg Frances Kendal
- Born: 25 December 1989 (age 36); Christchurch, Canterbury, New Zealand
- Batting: Left-handed
- Bowling: Left-arm medium
- Role: Wicket-keeper

International information
- National side: Ireland (2016–2017)
- ODI debut (cap 78): 9 September 2016 v Bangladesh
- Last ODI: 19 February 2017 v South Africa

Domestic team information
- Years: Team
- 2009/10–2013/14: Canterbury
- 2015–2016: Scorchers

Career statistics
Competition	WODI	WLA	WT20
Matches	6	52	32
Runs scored	79	1,028	153
Batting average	19.75	28.55	15.30
100s/50s	0/0	1/7	0/0
Top score	26*	125	24
Balls bowled	18	30	–
Wickets	0	0	–
Bowling average	–	–	–
5 wickets in innings	0	0	–
10 wickets in match	0	0	–
Best bowling	–	–	–
Catches/stumpings	1/–	26/3	21/11
- Source: CricketArchive, 28 May 2021

Meg Frances Kendal (born 25 December 1989) is a New Zealand-born Irish former cricketer who played as a wicket-keeper and right-handed batter. She appeared in 6 One Day Internationals for Ireland in 2016 and 2017. She played domestic cricket for Canterbury and Typhoons.
