= Ciara Metcalfe =

Irish cricketer (born 1979)

Personal information
- Full name: Ciara Johanna Metcalfe
- Born: 29 September 1979 (age 47); Dublin, Ireland
- Batting: Left-handed
- Bowling: Right-arm leg break
- Role: Bowler

International information
- National side: Ireland (1999–2018)
- Only Test (cap 6): 30 July 2000 v Pakistan
- ODI debut (cap 41): 19 July 1999 v Denmark
- Last ODI: 19 February 2017 v South Africa
- T20I debut (cap 16): 6 August 2009 v Netherlands
- Last T20I: 17 November 2018 v New Zealand

Domestic team information
- Years: Team
- 2015–2017: Dragons
- 2018: Northamptonshire

Career statistics
Competition	WTest	WODI	WT20I	WLA
Matches	1	53	25	80
Runs scored	–	127	11	237
Batting average	–	3.96	11.00	5.26
100s/50s	–	0/0	0/0	0/0
Top score	–	16	7	19
Balls bowled	120	2,381	483	3,561
Wickets	4	60	23	94
Bowling average	10.50	27.00	20.60	23.55
5 wickets in innings	0	1	0	1
10 wickets in match	0	0	0	0
Best bowling	4/26	5/18	4/15	5/18
Catches/stumpings	0/–	11/–	1/–	5/–
- Source: CricketArchive, 20 June 2021

Ciara Johanna Metcalfe (born 29 September 1979) is an Irish former cricketer who played as a right-arm leg break bowler. She appeared in 1 Test match, 53 One Day Internationals and 25 Twenty20 Internationals for Ireland between 1999 and 2018, playing her final match during the 2018 ICC Women's World Twenty20 tournament. She also played in the Women's Super Series for Dragons, and spent one season playing for Northamptonshire in 2018.

== Career ==
Metcalfe was born in Dublin, and has played club cricket for Malahide and Pembroke. Her debut for Ireland came in June 1999, against an England A team, and her One Day International (ODI) debut came the following month, at the age of 19, when she played three matches at the 1999 European Championship in Denmark. In July 2000, Metcalfe was selected in Ireland's squad for its inaugural (and, so far, only) Test match, against Pakistan. In Pakistan's first innings, she took 4/26 from twelve overs to help bowl the team out for 53. Several months later, Metcalfe was selected in the squad for the 2000 World Cup in New Zealand, although she would only play two matches at the tournament (against Sri Lanka and England).

One of Ireland's best spinners, Metcalfe was a regular in the national team throughout the remainder of the 2000s, although she did not gain selection for the 2005 World Cup in South Africa. In an ODI against the Netherlands at the 2007 European Championship, she took her only five-wicket haul at that level, 5/18 from 8.3 overs. Her performance set a new record for the best ODI bowling figures by an Irishwoman (beating Susan Bray's 5/27 against Denmark in 1990), although it has since been surpassed. The following year, at the 2008 World Cup Qualifier, Metcalfe took eight wickets at an average of 14.25, behind only Isobel Joyce for Ireland.

Metcalfe announced her retirement from international cricket in 2011, concluding her ODI career with figures of 4/27 against Sri Lanka. In 42 ODIs, she took 50 wickets at an average of 25.08, placing her behind only Isobel Joyce and Barbara McDonald in terms of wickets taken for Ireland. In 2015, however, Metcalfe announced that she would again be available for the national team. Her international appearances since her return have all been at Twenty20 International level, and have included a series against Australia and matches at the 2015 World Twenty20 Qualifier.

In June 2018, she was named in Ireland's squad for the 2018 ICC Women's World Twenty20 Qualifier tournament. During the tournament match against Uganda, she took her 100th wicket for Ireland. In October 2018, she was named in Ireland's squad for the 2018 ICC Women's World Twenty20. She announced that she would retire from international cricket at the end of the tournament.
