= Una Raymond-Hoey =

Irish cricketer (born 1996)

Personal information
- Full name: Una Raymond-Hoey
- Born: 29 October 1996 (age 30); Dublin, Ireland
- Batting: Right handed
- Bowling: Right-arm medium
- Role: Batter

International information
- National side: Ireland (2016–present)
- ODI debut (cap 77): 9 August 2016 v South Africa
- Last ODI: 27 November 2024 v Bangladesh
- T20I debut (cap 41): 26 May 2019 v West Indies
- Last T20I: 11 August 2024 v Sri Lanka

Domestic team information
- Years: Team
- 2015–2018: Scorchers
- 2019: Typhoons
- 2021: Scorchers
- 2022/23: Melbourne Stars
- 2022/23: Victoria

Career statistics
Competition	WODI	WT20I
Matches	8	8
Runs scored	113	24
Batting average	14.12	4.00
100s/50s	0/0	0/0
Top score	42	17
Balls bowled	18	–
Wickets	0	–
Bowling average	–	–
5 wickets in innings	0	–
10 wickets in match	0	–
Best bowling	–	–
Catches/stumpings	3/–	0/–
- Source: ESPNcricinfo, 27 November 2024

Una Raymond-Hoey (born 29 October 1996) is an Irish cricketer who has played for Scorchers, Typhoons, Melbourne Stars, Victoria and Ireland.

Raymond-Hoey has played in four One Day Internationals matches, making her debut against South Africa during their August 2016 tour. An opening batter, she scored 25 on her debut at the Malahide Cricket Club Ground.

In November 2018, she was named the International Emerging Player of the Year at the annual Cricket Ireland Awards.

In May 2019, she was named in Ireland's Women's Twenty20 International (WT20I) squad for their series against the West Indies. She made her WT20I debut for Ireland against the West Indies on 26 May 2019.

In August 2019, she was named in Ireland's squad for the 2019 ICC Women's World Twenty20 Qualifier tournament in Scotland. In July 2020, she was awarded a non-retainer contract by Cricket Ireland for the following year.

In October 2022, Raymond-Hoey was signed by Melbourne Stars for the 2022–23 Women's Big Bash League season as a replacement for Meg Lanning. She qualified as a local player, having emigrated to Australia to work and play cricket. Later in the same season, she joined Victoria.

She was named in the Ireland squad for their T20I and ODI tour to Bangladesh in November 2024.
