= Dragons (women's cricket) =

Irish women's cricket team

Personnel
- Captain: Leah Paul
- Coach: James Cameron-Dow

Team information
- Colours: Red
- Founded: 2015

History
- WSS wins: 3

Dragons are an Irish women's cricket team that compete in the Women's Super Series. They first competed in the Super Series from its inception in 2015 until 2019, after which the tournament was reduced to two teams during the COVID-19 pandemic, with Dragons missing out. In 2022 the team returned to the Super Series and, after initially having no geographical base, would return with a "Northern Irish focus". They have won three Super Series titles: in 2016, 2018 and 2019.

== History ==
Dragons were established in 2015 to compete in the Women's Super 3s, a tournament designed to bridge the gap between club cricket and international cricket in Ireland. The team was made up of some of the best players in Irish cricket, and were captained by Mary Waldron and coached by Rob O'Connor. In their first season Dragons finished 2nd in the group of 3, with four victories.

The following season, this time captained by Laura Delany, Dragons won their first Super 3s title, with four wins from six matches. They went unbeaten throughout the 50 over section of the tournament, and won one of their two T20s, a last ball thriller against Scorchers. The next season, 2017, Dragons fared worse, finishing bottom of the league with just two victories from ten matches.

2018 brought a return to form for the Dragons, as they won their second Super 3s title, led by Shauna Kavanagh. Highlights for the season included Cecelia Joyce's 118 in a victory over Scorchers, and Lara Maritz's bowling performances throughout the season. The following season, 2019, Dragons retained their title, their second in two seasons and third overall. They were victorious in five of their 10 matches, with a further three curtailed due to rain. They were captained by Kim Garth and coached by Clare Shillington.

In 2020, the tournament was forced into a restructure due to the COVID-19 pandemic and was reduced to two teams, with Dragons the team to miss out. Due to the ongoing effects of the pandemic, Dragons were again unable to compete in 2021.

In 2022, it was announced that Dragons would return to the Super Series for the upcoming season. The returning side was to have a Northern Ireland focus, with half of the squad playing for Northern Irish clubs, and employing a Northern Irish-based coach, James Cameron-Dow. Leah Paul captained the side. The side finished as runners-up in the Super 20 Trophy and in third in the Super 50 Cup. They finished second in both tournaments in 2023.

== Players ==
=== Current squad ===
Based on squad announced for the 2023 season. Players in bold have international caps.

No.	Name	Nationality	Birth date	Batting style	Bowling style	Notes
Batters
5	Abbi Harrison	Ireland	8 August 2006 (age 18)	Right-handed	Right-arm off break	
All-rounders
2	Amy Caulfield	Ireland	Unknown	Right-handed	Right-arm medium	
3	Aoife Fisher	Ireland	2 March 2005 (age 20)	Right-handed	Right-arm medium	
4	Mollie Devine	Ireland	Unknown	Right-handed	Right-arm medium	
11	**Arlene Kelly**	Ireland	8 January 1994 (age 31)	Right-handed	Right-arm medium	
12	**Bella Armstrong**	New Zealand	16 November 1999 (age 25)	Right-handed	Right-arm medium	Overseas player
16	**Leah Paul**	Ireland	10 September 1999 (age 25)	Left-handed	Slow left-arm orthodox	Captain
26	**Alana Dalzell**	Ireland	26 March 2001 (age 23)	Right-handed	Right-arm medium	
84	**Orla Prendergast**	Ireland	1 June 2001 (age 23)	Right-handed	Right-arm medium	
89	**Cara Murray**	Ireland	1 November 2000 (age 24)	Right-handed	Right-arm leg break	
Wicket-keepers
10	Jaimie-Lee Strang	Australia	Unknown	Right-handed	Right-arm medium	Overseas player
54	**Amy Hunter**	Ireland	11 October 2005 (age 19)	Right-handed	–	
Bowlers
6	Jess Mayes	Ireland	Unknown	Unknown	Unknown	
7	Kia McCartney	Ireland	16 March 2005 (age 20)	Right-handed	Right-arm off break	
8	Kate McEvoy	Ireland	Unknown	Right-handed	Right-arm medium	
12	Jemma Gillan	Ireland	Unknown	Right-handed	Right-arm medium	
–	Zara Craig	Ireland	13 October 2003 (age 21)	Right-handed	Right-arm medium	
–	Jennifer Jackson	Ireland	15 December 2005 (age 19)	Left-handed	Left-arm medium	

== Seasons ==
=== Women's Super Series ===
==== Combined format ====
Season	League standings								Notes
Season	P	W	L	T	A/C	NRR	Pts	Pos	Notes
2015	8	4	3	1	0	+0.505	9	2nd	
2016	6	4	1	0	1	+1.304	9	1st	Champions
2017	10	2	7	0	1	–0.951	5	3rd	
2018	10	6	2	0	2	+0.861	14	1st	Champions
2019	10	5	2	0	3	+0.155	13	1st	Champions

==== Super 50 Cup ====
Season	League standings								Notes
Season	P	W	L	T	A/C	NRR	Pts	Pos	Notes
2022	6	1	5	0	0	–1.110	2	3rd	
2023	6	2	1	0	3	+0.410	15	2nd	

==== Super 20 Trophy ====
Season	League standings								Notes
Season	P	W	L	T	A/C	NRR	Pts	Pos	Notes
2022	6	3	1	0	2	+0.547	8	2nd	
2023	6	3	3	0	0	–0.240	12	2nd	

== Honours ==
- Women's Super Series (combined format):
  - Winners (3): 2016, 2018 & 2019
