= Louise McCarthy =

Irish cricketer (born 1993)

Personal information
- Full name: Louise Noreen McCarthy
- Born: 18 October 1993 (age 33); Dublin, Ireland
- Batting: Right-handed
- Bowling: Right-arm medium
- Role: Bowler
- Relatives: Barry McCarthy (brother)

International information
- National side: Ireland (2010–2017)
- ODI debut (cap 64): 7 July 2010 v England
- Last ODI: 10 February 2017 v India
- T20I debut (cap 18): 14 October 2010 v Sri Lanka
- Last T20I: 3 August 2016 v South Africa

Domestic team information
- Years: Team
- 2015: Typhoons
- 2016–2017: Dragons
- 2018–2019: Typhoons
- 2019: Durham
- 2020: Scorchers

Career statistics
Competition	WODI	WT20I
Matches	28	28
Runs scored	75	47
Batting average	4.68	4.27
100s/50s	0/0	0/0
Top score	15	13
Balls bowled	1,130	540
Wickets	17	12
Bowling average	48.05	43.41
5 wickets in innings	0	0
10 wickets in match	0	0
Best bowling	4/18	2/14
Catches/stumpings	4/–	0/–
- Source: Cricinfo, 27 May 2021

Louise Noreen McCarthy (born 18 October 1993) is an Irish cricketer who plays as a right-arm medium bowler. She made her international debut for Ireland in 2010 at the age of 16, and went on to play 28 One Day Internationals and 28 Twenty20 Internationals between 2010 and 2017. In June 2020, she was added to Ireland's training squad following a three-year absence. In July 2020, she was awarded a non-retainer contract by Cricket Ireland for the following year. She has played domestic cricket for all three of the Women's Super Series teams, as well as spending the 2019 season with Durham. She is the sister of Barry McCarthy, who played for Durham and Ireland.
