= Jennifer Gray (cricketer) =

Irish cricketer (born 1993)

Personal information
- Born: 30 April 1993 (age 33); Dublin, Ireland
- Batting: Right-handed
- Bowling: Right-arm medium
- Role: All-rounder

International information
- National side: Ireland (2014–2018)
- ODI debut (cap 74): 10 January 2014 v Pakistan
- Last ODI: 13 June 2018 v New Zealand
- T20I debut (cap 31): 20 January 2014 v Pakistan
- Last T20I: 5 September 2016 v Bangladesh

Domestic team information
- Years: Team
- 2015–2016: Dragons
- 2017–2018: Typhoons
- 2019: Scorchers

Career statistics
Competition	WODI	WT20I	WLA	WT20
Matches	9	7	27	25
Runs scored	140	26	302	195
Batting average	17.50	3.71	14.38	10.83
100s/50s	0/0	0/0	0/0	0/0
Top score	35	10	48	42*
Balls bowled	54	–	278	66
Wickets	3	–	8	2
Bowling average	14.00	–	26.87	43.50
5 wickets in innings	0	–	0	0
10 wickets in match	0	–	0	0
Best bowling	3/40	–	3/40	2/33
Catches/stumpings	1/–	0/–	10/–	3/–
- Source: CricketArchive, 27 May 2021

Jennifer Gray (born 30 April 1993) is an Irish former cricketer who played as a right-handed batter and occasional right-arm medium bowler. She appeared in 9 One Day Internationals and 7 Twenty20 Internationals for Ireland between 2014 and 2018. She played domestic cricket for all three of the Women's Super Series teams.
