= Kim Garth =

Irish-Australian cricketer

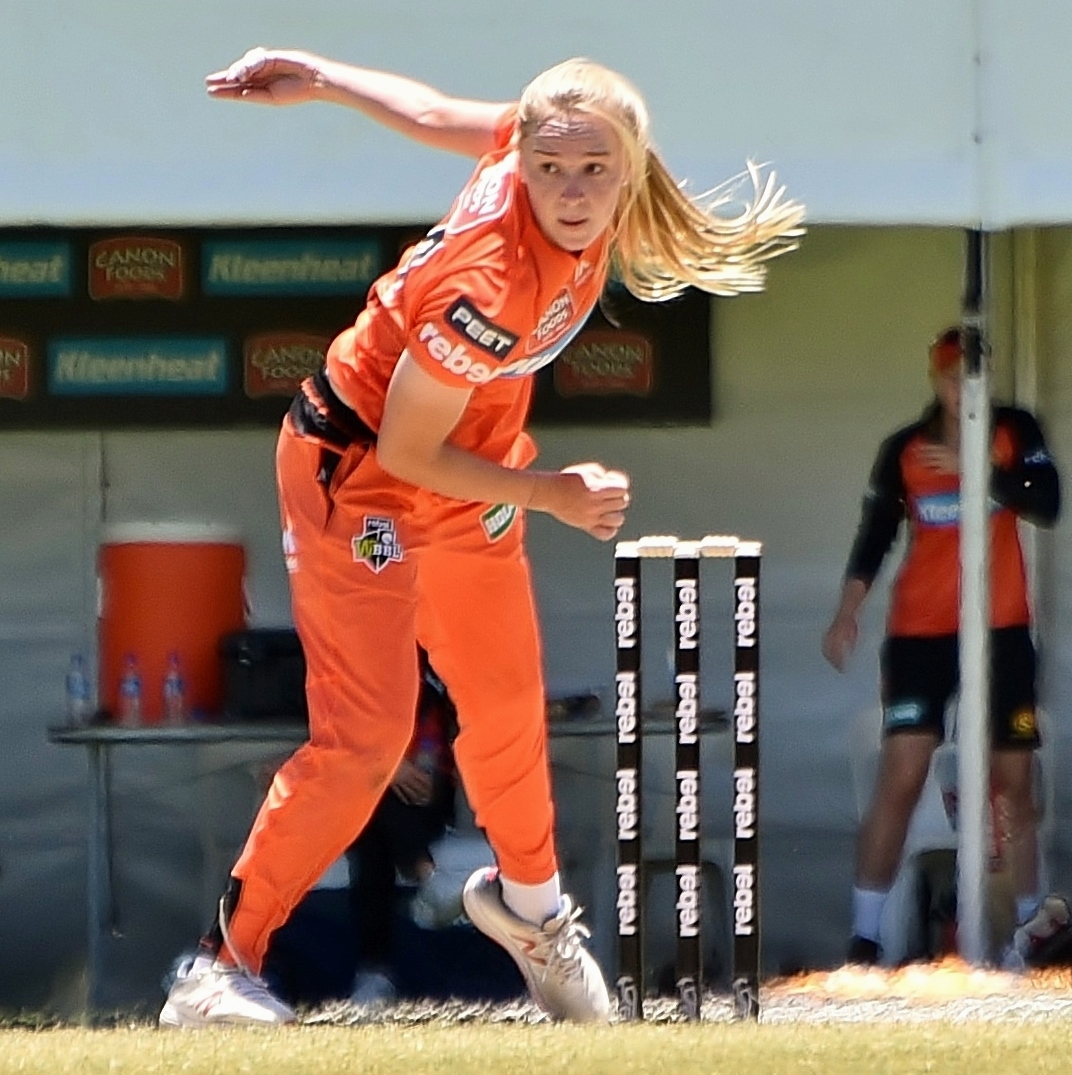
- Garth bowling for Perth Scorchers in November 2019

Personal information
- Full name: Kimberley Jennifer Garth
- Born: 25 April 1996 (age 30); Dublin, Ireland
- Batting: Right-handed
- Bowling: Right-arm medium-fast
- Role: All-rounder
- Relatives: Jonathan Garth (father); Anne-Marie McDonald (mother); Jonathan Garth (brother)

International information
- National sides: Ireland (2010–2019); Australia (2022-present)
- Test debut (cap 182): 22 June 2023; Australia v England
- Last Test: 30 January 2025; Australia v England
- ODI debut (cap 62/149): 4 July 2010; Ireland v New Zealand
- Last ODI: 29 March 2026; Australia v West Indies
- T20I debut (cap 21/58): 16 October 2010; Ireland v Pakistan
- Last T20I: 5 July 2026; Australia v England
- T20I shirt no.: 34

Domestic team information
- Years: Team
- 2015–2018: Scorchers
- 2016/17–2017/18: Sydney Sixers
- 2019: Dragons
- 2019/20: Perth Scorchers
- 2020/21–present: Victoria
- 2021/22–present: Melbourne Stars
- 2023: Gujarat Giants
- 2024: Manchester Originals
- 2025: Royal Challengers Bengaluru
- 2026: Trent Rockets

Career statistics
Competition	WTest	WODI	WT20I	WLA
Matches	4	66	73	129
Runs scored	103	624	778	1,739
Batting average	34.33	18.35	22.88	24.84
100s/50s	0/0	0/2	0/1	0/8
Top score	49*	72*	51*	98
Balls bowled	552	2,385	1,300	5,070
Wickets	8	68	59	147
Bowling average	33.12	25.13	23.13	22.29
5 wickets in innings	0	0	0	1
10 wickets in match	0	–	–	–
Best bowling	2/13	4/11	3/6	5/11
Catches/stumpings	3/–	24/1	19/–	41/1
Medal record
Women's Cricket
Representing Australia
T20 World Cup
Winner	2026 England & Wales
- Source: CricketArchive, 8 July 2026

Kimberley Jennifer Garth (born 25 April 1996) is an Irish-Australian cricketer who currently plays for Victoria, Melbourne Stars and Australia. An all-rounder, she plays as a right-arm medium bowler and right-handed batter. Between 2010 and 2019, she played international cricket for Ireland, the country of her birth, playing more than 100 matches for the side, before deciding to move to Australia. She made her international debut for Australia in December 2022.

== Biography ==
Born in Dublin, Garth is the daughter of Jonathan Garth and Anne-Marie McDonald, both of whom also played for Ireland. Her father was born in South Africa. Garth herself made her international debut in July 2010, in a one-off ODI against New Zealand. On debut, she was 14 years and 70 days old, making her the youngest Irishwoman to debut and the third-youngest overall (behind Pakistan's Sajjida Shah and Scotland's Fiona Urquhart). Several others have since debuted at younger ages.

Garth went on to play six more ODIs in 2010, including at the 2010 ICC Women's Challenge in South Africa. That competition featured both 50-over and 20-over components, with Garth making her Twenty20 International debut in the latter, against Pakistan. Aged 14 years and 174 days, she became the youngest player of any country to appear in that format, beating the record set by the Netherlands' Miranda Veringmeier. Three of her Irish teammates – Elena Tice, Lucy O'Reilly, and Gaby Lewis – have since debuted at younger ages.

Since making her debut, Garth has been a regular for Ireland at both ODI and T20I level. In ODIs, her most outstanding performance to date came in August 2012, when she took 4/11 from five overs against Bangladesh (including the first four wickets to fall). Her highest score at that level was made during the same month, an innings of 39 runs against Pakistan. In Twenty20 Internationals, Garth has taken two three-wicket hauls – 3/6 against the Netherlands in August 2011, and 3/17 against Australia in August 2015. Garth also acted as a wicket-keeper for 4 international matches in a quadrangular series in 2011.

In November 2015, Garth was named International Women's Player of the Year at the Cricket Ireland Awards.

In June 2018, she was named in Ireland's squad for the 2018 ICC Women's World Twenty20 Qualifier tournament. In October 2018, she was named in Ireland's squad for the 2018 ICC Women's World Twenty20 tournament in the West Indies. In Ireland's opening match of the tournament, against Australia, she made her 100th international appearance for the team. Following the conclusion of the tournament, she was named as the standout player in the team by the International Cricket Council (ICC).

In August 2019, she was named in Ireland's squad for the 2019 ICC Women's World Twenty20 Qualifier tournament in Scotland. She was the leading run-scorer for Ireland in the tournament, with 100 runs in five matches.

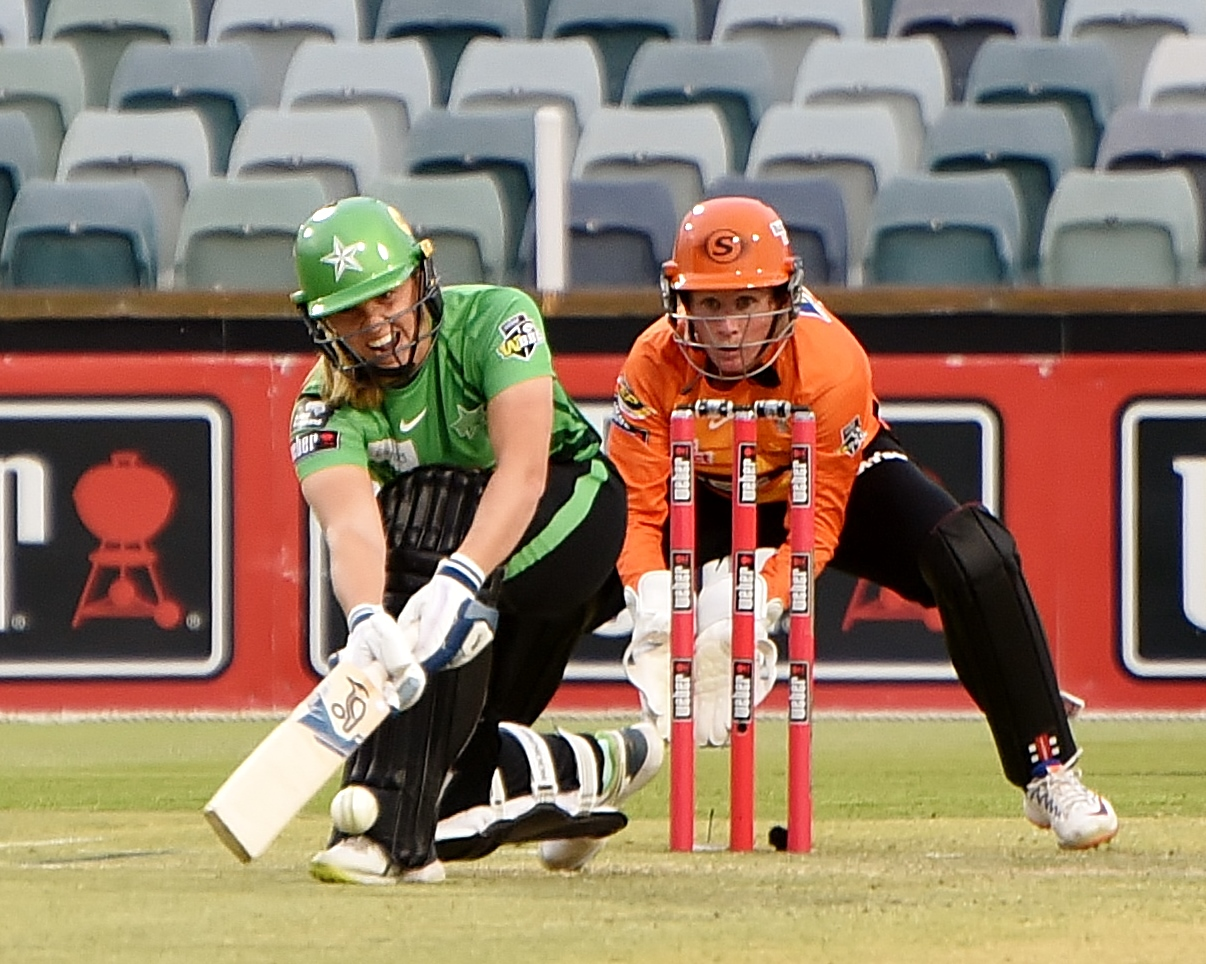
Garth batting for Melbourne Stars in October 2022

In June 2020, Garth accepted a two-year contract with the Victoria women's cricket team in Australia. She made her debut for Victoria in a Women's National Cricket League match in February 2021, taking 2-25 from 8.2 overs to help her new team to an eight-wicket win over arch-rivals New South Wales. Ahead of the 2020–21 season, she spent the Australian winter working with former Australia paceman Clint McKay on enhancing her game, and was then signed by Melbourne Stars. In the early stages of WBBL|07, she showcased her recently augmented skills by taking a match-winning 3–11 against Sydney Thunder, and then scoring 44* from 29 deliveries against Hobart Hurricanes the following day.

On 9 December 2022, she made her international debut for Australia, in a Twenty20 International against India.

In March 2023, she named in Australia's Test squad for the Ashes series against England. She made her Test debut in that match, on 22 June 2023.

She was named in the Australia squad for the 2024 ICC Women's T20 World Cup and the 2025 Women's Ashes series.

Her mother, Anne-Marie Garth and she both were first mother-daughter duo to play in Women's Cricket World Cup.
