= Clare Shillington =

Irish cricketer and coach

Personal information
- Full name: Clare Mary Alice Shillington
- Born: 8 January 1981 (age 45); Belfast, Northern Ireland
- Batting: Right-handed
- Bowling: Right-arm off break
- Role: Batter

International information
- National side: Ireland (1997–2018)
- Only Test (cap 9): 30 July 2000 v Pakistan
- ODI debut (cap 36): 8 August 1997 v South Africa
- Last ODI: 19 February 2017 v South Africa
- T20I debut (cap 11): 27 July 2008 v West Indies
- Last T20I: 17 November 2018 v New Zealand

Domestic team information
- Years: Team
- 2015–2018: Typhoons
- 2019: Dragons

Career statistics
Competition	WTest	WODI	WT20I	WLA
Matches	1	90	56	129
Runs scored	–	1,276	1,019	2,234
Batting average	–	17.72	18.52	21.07
100s/50s	–	0/6	0/1	1/10
Top score	–	95*	58*	107
Balls bowled	–	746	–	821
Wickets	–	20	–	22
Bowling average	–	20.60	–	20.36
5 wickets in innings	–	0	–	0
10 wickets in match	–	0	–	0
Best bowling	–	3/34	–	3/34
Catches/stumpings	1/–	28/–	12/–	40/–
- Source: CricketArchive, 27 May 2021

Clare Mary Alice Shillington (born 8 January 1981) is an Irish former cricketer and the current coach of Typhoons. She played as a right-handed batter and appeared in 1 Test match, 90 One Day Internationals and 56 Twenty20 Internationals for Ireland between 1997 and 2018. She played in her final match for Ireland in November 2018, during the 2018 ICC Women's World Twenty20 tournament.

== Career ==
She started her career as off-spinner and lower order batsman but later she became an opening batter. She was first woman to reach 100 caps for Ireland in women's cricket. She scored an unbeaten 114 against Japan in 2013 ICC Women's World Twenty20 Qualifier. She also captained Ireland in 15 ODIs from 2003 to 2011 as well as in Twenty20 Internationals.

In February 2016, Shillington announced her retirement from One Day Internationals after playing in Ireland's final World Cup Qualifier game against South Africa women's cricket team which Ireland lost.

In June 2018, she was named in Ireland's squad for the 2018 ICC Women's World Twenty20 Qualifier tournament. She was the leading run-scorer for Ireland in the tournament, with 126 runs in five matches, and was named the player of the tournament.

In October 2018, she was named in Ireland's squad for the 2018 ICC Women's World Twenty20. She announced that she will retire from international cricket following the end of the tournament. Ahead of the tournament, she was also named as one of the players to watch. During Ireland's match against India, she scored her 1,000th run in WT20Is. She was the leading run-scorer for Ireland in the tournament, with 81 runs in four matches.
