= Lucy O'Reilly =

Irish cricketer

Personal information
- Full name: Lucy Katherine O'Reilly
- Born: 9 November 1999 (age 27); Dublin, Ireland
- Batting: Right-handed
- Bowling: Right-arm medium
- Role: All-rounder
- Relatives: Peter O'Reilly (father)

International information
- National side: Ireland (2013–2018)
- ODI debut (cap 73): 10 July 2013 v Pakistan
- Last ODI: 19 February 2017 v South Africa
- T20I debut (cap 29): 8 July 2013 v Pakistan
- Last T20I: 15 November 2018 v India

Domestic team information
- Years: Team
- 2015–2019: Scorchers

Career statistics
Competition	WODI	WT20I	WLA	WT20
Matches	14	32	39	67
Runs scored	44	63	251	193
Batting average	4.40	7.00	11.95	10.15
100s/50s	0/0	0/0	0/0	0/0
Top score	14	14	32	28
Balls bowled	416	609	1,312	1,275
Wickets	8	27	41	63
Bowling average	43.00	25.03	19.75	18.49
5 wickets in innings	0	0	0	0
10 wickets in match	0	0	0	0
Best bowling	2/66	4/28	4/19	4/8
Catches/stumpings	9/–	4/–	14/–	11/–
- Source: CricketArchive, 27 May 2021

Lucy Katherine O'Reilly (born 9 November 1999) is an Irish cricketer who plays primarily as a right-arm medium bowler. In June 2018, she was named in Ireland's squad for the 2018 ICC Women's World Twenty20 Qualifier tournament. She was the leading wicket-taker for the tournament, with eleven dismissals in four matches. Following the conclusion of the tournament, she was named as the rising star of Ireland's squad by the International Cricket Council (ICC). In July 2018, she was named in the ICC Women's Global Development Squad. She played in the Women's Super Series for Scorchers.

In October 2018, she was named in Ireland's squad for the 2018 ICC Women's World Twenty20 tournament in the West Indies. Ahead of the tournament, she was named as one of the players to watch. She was the leading wicket-taker for Ireland in the tournament, with four dismissals in three matches. In April 2019, O'Reilly took a voluntary break from cricket.
