= Laura Delany =

Irish cricketer (born 1992)

Personal information
- Full name: Laura Katherine Delany
- Born: 23 December 1992 (age 33); Dartry, Dublin, Ireland
- Batting: Right-handed
- Bowling: Right-arm medium
- Role: All-rounder
- Relatives: Gareth Delany (brother); David Delany (cousin)

International information
- National side: Ireland
- ODI debut (cap 61): 4 July 2010 v New Zealand
- Last ODI: 19 December 2025 v South Africa
- T20I debut (cap 17): 14 October 2010 v Sri Lanka
- Last T20I: 1 February 2026 v Thailand

Domestic team information
- Years: Team
- 2015–2016: Dragons
- 2017–present: Typhoons
- 2023: North West Thunder

Career statistics
Competition	WODI	WT20I
Matches	75	132
Runs scored	1411	1659
Batting average	23.13	21.26
100s/50s	1/5	0/4
Top score	109	91
Balls bowled	1800	1757
Wickets	31	96
Bowling average	46.12	18.91
5 wickets in innings	0	0
10 wickets in match	0	0
Best bowling	3/26	4/9
Catches/stumpings	12/–	26/–
- Source: Cricinfo, 17 August 2026

Laura Katherine Delany (born 23 December 1992) is an Irish cricketer who currently captains Typhoons. She is a right-handed batter and right-arm medium pace bowler. Delany made her debut for Ireland in a Women's One-Day International (WODI) against New Zealand at Kibworth Cricket Club New Ground in July 2010. In July 2021, during Ireland's home series against the Netherlands, Delany broke the captaincy record for her team, leading them for the 63rd time, passing Isobel Joyce's record of 62 matches as captain.

In November 2021, Delany was named the ICC Player of the Month.

== Biography ==
In April 2016, she was named as captain of Ireland replacing Isobel Joyce who stepped down after the 2016 ICC Women's World Twenty20 in India. In May 2017, she played in her 100th international match, when Ireland played South Africa in the 2017 South Africa Quadrangular Series.

In June 2018, she was named as captain of Ireland for the 2018 ICC Women's World Twenty20 Qualifier tournament. In October 2018, she was named as captain of Ireland's squad for the 2018 ICC Women's World Twenty20 tournament in the West Indies. The following month, she was named the Women's International Player of the Year at the annual Cricket Ireland Awards.

In August 2019, she was named as the captain of Ireland's squad for the 2019 ICC Women's World Twenty20 Qualifier tournament in Scotland. In July 2020, she was awarded a part-time professional contract by Cricket Ireland for the following year.

In the Women's Super Series, she played for Dragons in 2015 and 2016, and captained them in 2016. She joined Typhoons in 2017, and has captained them ever since, including to their first title in 2020.

In November 2021, she was named as the captain of Ireland's team for the 2021 Women's Cricket World Cup Qualifier tournament in Zimbabwe. In September 2023, it was announced that Delany had signed for North West Thunder for the side's remaining Rachael Heyhoe Flint Trophy matches.

Delany was named in the Ireland squad for their T20I and ODI tour to Bangladesh in November 2024.

Delany was part of the Ireland squad for the 2025 Women's Cricket World Cup Qualifier in Pakistan in April 2025.
