= Amy Kenealy =

Irish cricketer (born 1988)

Personal information
- Full name: Amy Johanna Kenealy
- Born: 6 April 1988 (age 38); Dublin, Ireland
- Batting: Right-handed
- Bowling: Right-arm medium
- Role: Bowler
- Relatives: Suzanne Kenealy (sister)

International information
- National side: Ireland (2008–2018)
- ODI debut (cap 56): 24 June 2008 v West Indies
- Last ODI: 13 June 2018 v New Zealand
- T20I debut (cap 7): 27 June 2008 v West Indies
- Last T20I: 1 July 2018 v Bangladesh

Domestic team information
- Years: Team
- 2015–2018: Typhoons
- 2019: Scorchers

Career statistics
Competition	WODI	WT20I	WLA	WT20
Matches	23	24	59	56
Runs scored	104	44	281	122
Batting average	6.11	5.50	7.20	8.13
100s/50s	0/0	0/0	0/0	0/0
Top score	21*	11*	26	26*
Balls bowled	672	335	2,184	848
Wickets	16	7	54	27
Bowling average	38.06	57.00	26.64	34.11
5 wickets in innings	0	0	0	0
10 wickets in match	0	0	0	0
Best bowling	4/32	2/19	4/32	3/13
Catches/stumpings	4/–	1/–	13/–	3/–
- Source: CricketArchive, 27 May 2021

Amy Johanna Kenealy (born 6 April 1988) is an Irish former cricketer who played as a right-arm medium bowler. She appeared in 23 One Day Internationals and 24 Twenty20 Internationals for Ireland between 2008 and 2018. She played domestic cricket for Typhoons and Scorchers.
