= Shauna Kavanagh =

Irish cricketer (born 1992)

Personal information
- Full name: Shauna Maire Kavanagh
- Born: 21 April 1992 (age 34); Dublin, Ireland
- Batting: Right-handed
- Bowling: Right-arm medium
- Role: Wicket-keeper

International information
- National side: Ireland (2011–present)
- ODI debut (cap 68): 26 April 2011 v Netherlands
- Last ODI: 22 August 2022 v Netherlands
- T20I debut (cap 24): 26 August 2011 v Netherlands
- Last T20I: 25 September 2022 v Bangladesh

Domestic team information
- Years: Team
- 2015–2018: Dragons
- 2019–present: Scorchers

Career statistics
Competition	WODI	WT20I
Matches	27	54
Runs scored	206	335
Batting average	10.84	11.55
100s/50s	0/0	0/0
Top score	34	37
Balls bowled	129	6
Wickets	1	0
Bowling average	140.00	–
5 wickets in innings	0	0
10 wickets in match	0	0
Best bowling	1/29	–
Catches/stumpings	17/0	4/1
- Source: ESPN Cricinfo, 2 October 2022

Shauna Maire Kavanagh (born 21 April 1992) is a Dublin-born Irish international cricketer who plays her club level cricket at Pembroke Cricket Club. She attended school at Loretto College Foxrork, and later attended St. Andrews College in Booterstown, Dublin. Kavanagh is a right-handed batter and wicket-keeper, as well as bowling right-arm medium pace. She has represented Leinster Development squads for under 15's, 17's and 19's, and has also represented the Irish under 15's and 17's women's teams, Ireland A and has also made it onto the Ireland's senior women's team. She went to Bangladesh in November 2011 with the Irish senior Women's team to compete in the ICC Women's World Cup Qualifiers. She plays for Scorchers in the Women's Super Series.

In June 2018, she was named in Ireland's squad for the 2018 ICC Women's World Twenty20 Qualifier tournament. In July 2018, she was named in the ICC Women's Global Development Squad. In October 2018, she was named in Ireland's squad for the 2018 ICC Women's World Twenty20 tournament in the West Indies.

In August 2019, she was named in Ireland's squad for the 2019 ICC Women's World Twenty20 Qualifier tournament in Scotland. In July 2020, she was awarded a part-time professional contract by Cricket Ireland for the following year. In November 2021, she was named in Ireland's team for the 2021 Women's Cricket World Cup Qualifier tournament in Zimbabwe. In June 2022, during Ireland's home series against South Africa, Kavanagh played in her 100th international match for Ireland.
