= 2022 Super 50 Cup =

Irish women's cricket tournament

- Dates: 1 May – 10 August 2022
- Administrator: Cricket Ireland
- Cricket format: 50 over
- Tournament format: League
- Champions: Scorchers (6th title)
- Participants: 3
- Matches: 9
- Most runs: Gaby Lewis (287)
- Most wickets: Bhavisha Devchand (11)

The 2022 Arachas Super 50 Cup was the 50 over section of the eighth Women's Super Series competition, that took place in Ireland. The tournament ran from May to August 2022, alongside the Twenty20 Arachas Super 20 Trophy. Three teams competed in a triple round-robin group stage: Dragons, Scorchers and Typhoons. The tournament was won by Scorchers.

== Competition format ==
The three sides played each other side twice in 50 over matches between May and August. The tournament worked on a league system.

The league worked on a points system with positions being based on the total points. Points were awarded as follows:

Win: 2 points.
Tie: 1 point.
Loss: 0 points.
Abandoned/No Result: 1 point.

== Squads ==
Dragons	Scorchers	Typhoons
Leah Paul (c); Amy Caulfield; Alison Cowan; Zara Craig; Alana Dalzell; Mollie Devine; Sarah Forbes; Abbi Harrison; Amy Hunter; Arlene Kelly; Charlotte Lyons; Kia McCartney; Kate McEvoy; Cara Murray; Orla Prendergast; Jemma Rankin	Gaby Lewis (c); Christina Coulter Reilly; Rachel Delaney; Bhavisha Devchand; Shauna Kavanagh; Anna Kerrison; Hannah Little; Sophie MacMahon; Aimee Maguire; Jane Maguire; Lara Maritz; Ellie McGee; Niamh McNulty; Eimear Richardson; Jenny Sparrow; Siúin Woods	Laura Delany (c); Ava Canning; Sarah Condron; Georgina Dempsey; Rebecca Gough; Maria Kerrison; Robyn Lewis; Louise Little; Joanna Loughran; Tess Maritz; Lara McBride; Celeste Raack; Freya Sargent; Robyn Searle; Rebecca Stokell; Mary Waldron

Source: Cricket Ireland

== Points table ==
Team	Pld	W	L	T	NR	A	Pts	NRR
Scorchers (C)	6	5	0	0	0	1	11	+2.41
Typhoons	6	2	3	0	0	1	5	–0.96
Dragons	6	1	5	0	0	0	2	–1.11

Source: CricketArchive

== Fixtures ==
Source: Cricket Ireland

1 May 2022
10:45
Scorecard

Scorchers	v	Typhoons

Match Abandoned
Anglesea Road Cricket Ground, Dublin

- No toss.
- No play possible due to rain.

8 May 2022
10:45
Scorecard

Dragons; 148 (43 overs)	v	Scorchers; 149/9 (35.2 overs)
Mollie Devine 27 (61); Jane Maguire 3/20 (9 overs)		Shauna Kavanagh 45* (45); Orla Prendergast 2/13 (6 overs)

Scorchers won by 1 wicket
North County Cricket Club, Balrothery
Umpires: AA Baig and M Hawthorne

- Scorchers won the toss and elected to field.

15 May 2022
10:45
Scorecard

Dragons; 258/7 (50 overs)	v	Typhoons; 194 (44.5 overs)
Sarah Forbes 67 (98); Ava Canning 2/38 (7 overs)		Mary Waldron 43 (41); Arlene Kelly 3/35 (10 overs)

Dragons won by 64 runs
Wallace Park, Lisburn
Umpires: JM Kennedy and JAJ McCready

- Typhoons won the toss and elected to field.

22 May 2022
10:45
Scorecard

Typhoons; 120 (44 overs)	v	Scorchers; 121/4 (24.2 overs)
Ava Canning 24 (37); Rachel Delaney 2/17 (10 overs)		Gaby Lewis 62* (66); Robyn Searle 2/24 (3 overs)

Scorchers won by 6 wickets
Oak Hill Cricket Club Ground, Kilbride
Umpires: P Reynolds and A Seaver

- Scorchers won the toss and elected to field.

29 May 2022
10:45
Scorecard

Scorchers; 297/7 (50 overs)	v	Dragons; 124 (33.1 overs)
Gaby Lewis 122 (108); Amy Caulfield 3/46 (8 overs)		Leah Paul 33 (39); Rachel Delaney 4/23 (10 overs)

Scorchers won by 173 runs
Wallace Park, Lisburn
Umpires: A Seaver and S Wood

- Dragons won the toss and elected to field.

31 July 2022
10:45
Scorecard

Typhoons; 233/9 (50 overs)	v	Dragons; 216 (43 overs)
Laura Delany 83* (72); Zara Craig 1/18 (3 overs)		Sarah Forbes 65 (125); Robyn Searle 4/32 (6 overs)

Typhoons won by 17 runs
Kenure, Rush
Umpires: S Burrowes and V O'Hara

- Dragons won the toss and elected to field.

3 August 2022
10:45
Scorecard

Typhoons; 165 (45.3 overs)	v	Scorchers; 166/3 (32.1 overs)
Mary Waldron 62 (102); Bhavisha Devchand 5/33 (10 overs)		Gaby Lewis 103* (103); Louise Little 1/29 (5 overs)

Scorchers won by 7 wickets
Sydney Parade, Dublin
Umpires: W Clarke and JAJ McCready

- Typhoons won the toss and elected to bat.

7 August 2022
10:45
Scorecard

Dragons; 222/9 (50 overs)	v	Scorchers; 223/3 (31.1 overs)
Arlene Kelly 72 (78); Bhavisha Devchand 4/44 (10 overs)		Bhavisha Devchand 112 (93); Cara Murray 2/42 (5.1 overs)

Scorchers won by 7 wickets
Lurgan Cricket Club, Lurgan
Umpires: S Burrowes and G Morrison

- Scorchers won the toss and elected to bowl.

10 August 2022
10:45
Scorecard

Typhoons; 308/3 (50 overs)	v	Dragons; 280/9 (50 overs)
Robyn Searle 143* (140); Amy Caulfield 1/24 (6 overs)		Arlene Kelly 87 (74); Georgina Dempsey 3/41 (10 overs)

Typhoons won by 28 runs
Castle Avenue, Dublin
Umpires: AJ Neill and W Clarke

- Typhoons won the toss and elected to bat.
- Robyn Searle (Typhoons) made the highest score in Super Series history, with 143*.
