= 2022 Super 20 Trophy =

Irish women's cricket tournament

- Dates: 26 June – 10 July 2022
- Administrator: Cricket Ireland
- Cricket format: Twenty20
- Tournament format: League
- Champions: Scorchers (5th title)
- Participants: 3
- Matches: 9
- Most runs: Amy Hunter (243)
- Most wickets: Ellie McGee (8)

The 2022 Arachas Super 20 Trophy was the Twenty20 section of the eighth Women's Super Series competition, that took place in Ireland. The tournament took place in June and July 2022, alongside the 50 over Arachas Super 50 Cup. Three teams competed in a triple round-robin group stage: Dragons, Scorchers and Typhoons. The tournament was won by Scorchers.

== Competition format ==
The three sides played each other side twice in Twenty20 matches in June and July, including three matchdays involving double-headers. The tournament worked on a league system.

The league worked on a points system with positions based on the total points. Points were awarded as follows:

Win: 2 points.
Tie: 1 point.
Loss: 0 points.
Abandoned/No Result: 1 point.

== Squads ==
Dragons	Scorchers	Typhoons
Leah Paul (c); Amy Caulfield; Alison Cowan; Zara Craig; Alana Dalzell; Mollie Devine; Sarah Forbes; Abbi Harrison; Amy Hunter; Arlene Kelly; Charlotte Lyons; Kia McCartney; Kate McEvoy; Cara Murray; Orla Prendergast; Jemma Rankin	Gaby Lewis (c); Christina Coulter Reilly; Rachel Delaney; Bhavisha Devchand; Shauna Kavanagh; Anna Kerrison; Hannah Little; Sophie MacMahon; Aimee Maguire; Jane Maguire; Lara Maritz; Ellie McGee; Niamh McNulty; Eimear Richardson; Jenny Sparrow; Siúin Woods	Laura Delany (c); Ava Canning; Sarah Condron; Georgina Dempsey; Rebecca Gough; Maria Kerrison; Robyn Lewis; Louise Little; Joanna Loughran; Tess Maritz; Lara McBride; Celeste Raack; Freya Sargent; Robyn Searle; Rebecca Stokell; Mary Waldron

Source: Cricket Ireland

== Points table ==
Team	Pld	W	L	T	NR	A	Pts	NRR
Scorchers (C)	6	3	1	0	1	1	8	+0.500
Dragons	6	3	1	0	0	2	8	+0.547
Typhoons	6	0	4	0	1	1	2	–1.015

Source: CricketArchive

The tournament rules state that tie-breakers for sides level on points shall be applied in the following order - most wins, teams achieving most wins in matches between other teams level on points (head-to-head), then highest Net Run Rate across the whole competition. Scorchers and Dragons finished on the same number of points and wins, and each won one match against the other. Dragons finished with a superior Net Run Rate; however, the title was awarded to Scorchers.

== Fixtures ==
Source: Cricket Ireland

26 June 2022
11:00
Scorecard

Dragons	v	Typhoons

Match Abandoned
The Lawn, Waringstown

- No toss.
- No play possible due to rain.

26 June 2022
15:00
Scorecard

Dragons	v	Scorchers

Match Abandoned
The Lawn, Waringstown

- No toss.
- No play possible due to rain.

1 July 2022
14:00
Scorecard

Typhoons; 151/5 (16.5 overs)	v	Scorchers
Laura Delany 54* (35); Bhavisha Devchand 2/24 (3 overs); Sophie MacMahon 2/24 (3 overs)

No Result
Kenure, Rush
Umpires: W Clarke and A Baig

- Scorchers won the toss and elected to bowl.
- No further play possible due to rain.

3 July 2022
11:00
Scorecard

Typhoons; 154/6 (20 overs)	v	Scorchers; 155/6 (19.1 overs)
Laura Delany 68* (48); Jenny Sparrow 1/12 (2 overs)		Gaby Lewis 46 (32); Robyn Searle 2/9 (2 overs)

Scorchers won by 4 wickets
Anglesea Road Cricket Ground, Dublin
Umpires: W Clarke and A Baig

- Scorchers won the toss and elected to bowl.

3 July 2022
15:00
Scorecard

Dragons; 157/7 (20 overs)	v	Scorchers; 161/1 (15.5 overs)
Amy Hunter 71 (48); Ellie McGee 4/14 (3 overs)		Gaby Lewis 104* (49); Leah Paul 1/22 (3 overs)

Scorchers won by 9 wickets
Anglesea Road Cricket Ground, Dublin
Umpires: A Baig and W Clarke

- Dragons won the toss and elected to bat.

6 July 2022
14:00
Scorecard

Typhoons; 137/6 (20 overs)	v	Dragons; 138/5 (18.2 overs)
Laura Delany 53 (42); Leah Paul 3/23 (4 overs)		Amy Hunter 69 (50); Celeste Raack 3/22 (4 overs)

Dragons won by 5 wickets
Observatory Lane, Dublin
Umpires: P Reynolds and A Seaver

- Dragons won the toss and elected to bowl.

8 July 2022
14:00
Scorecard

Scorchers; 105/5 (20 overs)	v	Dragons; 106/6 (17.1 overs)
Anna Kerrison 32* (44); Arlene Kelly 2/9 (4 overs)		Leah Paul 40 (37); Lara Maritz 1/7 (3 overs)

Dragons won by 4 wickets
Bready Cricket Club Ground, Magheramason, County Tyrone
Umpires: AJ Neill and I Gamble

- Dragons won the toss and elected to bowl.

10 July 2022
11:00
Scorecard

Scorchers; 189/6 (20 overs)	v	Typhoons; 172/7 (20 overs)
Gaby Lewis 76 (46); Jess Mayes 2/16 (2 overs)		Rebecca Stokell 57 (41); Rachel Delaney 2/24 (4 overs)

Scorchers won by 17 runs
Oak Hill Cricket Club Ground, Kilbride
Umpires: A Baig and W Houston

- Scorchers won the toss and elected to bat.

10 July 2022
15:00
Scorecard

Dragons; 177/5 (20 overs)	v	Typhoons; 136/7 (20 overs)
Amy Hunter 69 (47); Lara McBride 2/28 (4 overs)		Mary Waldron 44 (28); Leah Paul 2/16 (4 overs)

Dragons won by 41 runs
Oak Hill Cricket Club Ground, Kilbride
Umpires: A Baig and W Houston

- Dragons won the toss and elected to bat.
