= 2023 Super 20 Trophy =

Irish women's cricket tournament

- Dates: 1 May – 5 June 2023
- Administrator: Cricket Ireland
- Cricket format: Twenty20
- Tournament format: League
- Champions: Scorchers (7th title)
- Participants: 3
- Matches: 9
- Most runs: Mary-Anne Musonda (182)
- Most wickets: Sophie MacMahon (12)

The 2023 Super 20 Trophy, known for sponsorship reasons as the 2023 Evoke Super 20 Trophy, was the Twenty20 section of the ninth Women's Super Series competition, that took place in Ireland. The tournament took place in May and June 2023, and was followed by the 50 over Super 50 Cup. Three teams competed in a triple round-robin group stage: Dragons, Scorchers and Typhoons. The tournament was won by Scorchers, their third T20 title in a row.

== Competition format ==
The three sides played each other side twice in Twenty20 matches in May and June, including three matchdays involving double-headers. The tournament worked on a league system.

The league worked on a points system with positions being based on the total points. Points were awarded as follows:

Win: 4 points.
Tie: 2 points.
Loss: 0 points.
Abandoned/No Result: 2 points.
Bonus Points: 1 bonus point awarded for run rate being 1.25x that of opponent.

== Squads ==
Dragons	Scorchers	Typhoons
Leah Paul (c); Bella Armstrong; Amy Caulfield; Zara Craig; Alana Dalzell; Mollie Devine; Aoife Fisher; Jemma Gillan; Abbi Harrison; Amy Hunter; Jennifer Jackson; Jess Mayes; Kia McCartney; Kate McEvoy; Cara Murray; Arlene Kelly; Orla Prendergast; Jaimie-Lee Strang	Gaby Lewis (c); Christina Coulter Reilly; Polly Inglis; Shauna Kavanagh; Anna Kerrison; Hannah Little; Sophie MacMahon; Aimee Maguire; Jane Maguire; Lara Maritz; Ellie McGee; Isabelle McLean; Julie McNally; Niamh MacNulty; Genevieve Morrissey; Mary-Anne Musonda; Jenny Sparrow; Annabel Squires; Siúin Woods	Rebecca Stokell (c); Georgia Atkinson; Jane Butterly; Ava Canning; Laura Delany; Georgina Dempsey; Sarah Forbes; Rebecca Gough; Louise Little; Joanna Loughran; Lara McBride; Celeste Raack; Freya Sargent; Robyn Searle; Alice Tector; Sinead Thompson; Mary Waldron; Alice Walsh

Source: Cricket Ireland

== Points table ==
Team	Pld	W	L	T	NR	A	BP	Pts	NRR
Scorchers (C)	6	4	2	0	0	0	2	18	+0.39
Dragons	6	3	3	0	0	0	0	12	–0.24
Typhoons	6	2	4	0	0	0	2	10	–0.14

Source: NVPlay

== Fixtures ==
Source: Cricket Ireland

1 May 2023
14:00
Scorecard

Dragons; 82/9 (20 overs)	v	Scorchers; 83/5 (18.3 overs)
Leah Paul 27 (42); Hannah Little 2/6 (4 overs)		Mary-Anne Musonda 36* (49); Alana Dalzell 2/9 (3 overs)

Scorchers won by 5 wickets
Malahide Cricket Club Ground, Malahide
Umpires: P Reynolds and S Wood

- Scorchers won the toss and elected to bowl.
- Points: Scorchers 4, Dragons 0

7 May 2023
11:00

Dragons; 96/6 (20 overs)	v	Typhoons; 97/2 (15.3 overs)
Jaimie-Lee Strang 28 (29); Georgina Dempsey 2/21 (4 overs)		Robyn Searle 38* (50); Kate McEvoy 1/7 (2 overs)

Typhoons won by 8 wickets
Wallace Park, Lisburn

- Typhoons won the toss and elected to bowl.
- Points: Typhoons 5, Dragons 0

7 May 2023
15:00
Scorecard

Dragons; 113/4 (20 overs)	v	Scorchers; 117/3 (17.1 overs)
Amy Hunter 60 (52); Niamh MacNulty 2/21 (4 overs)		Mary-Anne Musonda 38 (25); Alana Dalzell 1/7 (2 overs)

Scorchers won by 7 wickets
Wallace Park, Lisburn
Umpires: M Hawthorne and G Morrison

- Scorchers won the toss and elected to bowl.
- Points: Scorchers 4, Dragons 0

14 May 2023
11:00
Scorecard

Scorchers; 80/9 (20 overs)	v	Typhoons; 68/2 (11.4 overs)
Lara Maritz 26 (29); Freya Sargent 4/15 (4 overs)		Mary Waldron 23* (24)

Typhoons won by 8 wickets ((DLS)
Anglesea Road Cricket Ground, Dublin
Umpires: A Baig and W Clarke

- Typhoons won the toss and elected to bowl.
- Typhoons innings reduced to 16 overs due to rain; revised target was 67.
- Points: Typhoons 5, Scorchers 0

14 May 2023
15:00
Scorecard

Dragons; 115 (19.2 overs)	v	Scorchers; 92 (19.5 overs)
Leah Paul 33 (30); Niamh MacNulty 3/22 (4 overs)		Gaby Lewis 21 (27); Orla Prendergast 3/7 (4 overs)

Dragons won by 23 runs
Anglesea Road Cricket Ground, Dublin
Umpires: A Baig and W Clarke

- Scorchers won the toss and elected to bowl.
- Points: Dragons 4, Scorchers 0

21 May 2023
11:00
Scorecard

Scorchers; 121/3 (20 overs)	v	Typhoons; 96 (19.2 overs)
Mary-Anne Musonda 71* (69); Ava Canning 1/20 (4 overs)		Mary Waldron 16 (20); Sophie MacMahon 5/12 (3.2 overs)

Scorchers won by 25 runs
Oak Hill Cricket Club Ground, Kilbride
Umpires: A Seaver and W Clarke

- Typhoons won the toss and elected to bowl.
- Points: Scorchers 5, Typhoons 0

21 May 2023
15:00
Scorecard

Typhoons; 113/5 (20 overs)	v	Dragons; 114/5 (19.4 overs)
Georgia Atkinson 43 (30); Arlene Kelly 2/12 (4 overs)		Amy Hunter 46* (44); Louise Little 2/24 (4 overs)

Dragons won by 5 wickets
Oak Hill Cricket Club Ground, Kilbride
Umpires: W Clarke and A Seaver

- Typhoons won the toss and elected to bat.
- Points: Dragons 4, Typhoons 0

28 May 2023
14:00
Scorecard

Dragons; 120/7 (20 overs)	v	Typhoons; 119/5 (20 overs)
Leah Paul 44 (37); Laura Delany 3/21 (4 overs)		Mary Waldron 56 (53); Cara Murray 2/21 (4 overs)

Dragons won by 1 run
Woodvale Road, Eglinton
Umpires: G Brolly and V O'Hara

- Typhoons won the toss and elected to bat.

5 June 2023
14:00
Scorecard

Typhoons; 101 (18.4 overs)	v	Scorchers; 102/1 (13.1 overs)
Robyn Searle 25 (21); Sophie MacMahon 3/9 (3 overs)		Gaby Lewis 50* (48); Alice Tector 1/11 (3 overs)

Scorchers won by 9 wickets
Oak Hill Cricket Club Ground, Kilbride
Umpires: A Baig and S Wood

- Typhoons won the toss and elected to bat.
