= 2023 Super 50 Cup =

Irish women's cricket tournament

- Dates: 18 June – 17 September 2023
- Administrator: Cricket Ireland
- Cricket format: 50 over
- Tournament format: League
- Champions: Typhoons (2nd title)
- Participants: 3
- Matches: 9
- Most runs: Robyn Searle (238)
- Most wickets: Georgia Atkinson (10)

The 2023 Super 50 Cup, known for sponsorship reasons as the 2023 Evoke Super 50 Cup, was the 50 over section of the ninth Women's Super Series competition, that took place in Ireland. The tournament took place between June and September 2023, following the Twenty20 Super 20 Trophy. Three teams competed in a triple round-robin group stage: Dragons, Scorchers and Typhoons.

The tournament was won by Typhoons, who won four of their six matches.

== Competition format ==
The three sides played each other side twice in 50 over matches between June and September. The tournament worked on a league system.

The league worked on a points system with positions being based on the total points. Points were awarded as follows:

Win: 4 points.
Tie: 2 points.
Loss: 0 points.
Abandoned/No Result: 2 points.
Bonus Points: 1 bonus point awarded for run rate being 1.25x that of opponent.

== Squads ==
Dragons	Scorchers	Typhoons
Leah Paul (c); Bella Armstrong; Amy Caulfield; Zara Craig; Alana Dalzell; Mollie Devine; Aoife Fisher; Jemma Gillan; Abbi Harrison; Amy Hunter; Jennifer Jackson; Arlene Kelly; Jess Mayes; Kia McCartney; Kate McEvoy; Cara Murray; Orla Prendergast; Jaimie-Lee Strang	Gaby Lewis (c); Christina Coulter Reilly; Polly Inglis; Shauna Kavanagh; Anna Kerrison; Hannah Little; Sophie MacMahon; Aimee Maguire; Jane Maguire; Lara Maritz; Ellie McGee; Isabelle McLean; Julie McNally; Niamh MacNulty; Genevieve Morrissey; Mary-Anne Musonda; Jenny Sparrow; Annabel Squires; Siúin Woods	Rebecca Stokell (c); Georgia Atkinson; Jane Butterly; Ava Canning; Laura Delany; Georgina Dempsey; Sarah Forbes; Rebecca Gough; Louise Little; Joanna Loughran; Lara McBride; Celeste Raack; Freya Sargent; Robyn Searle; Alice Tector; Sinead Thompson; Mary Waldron; Alice Walsh

Source: Cricket Ireland

== Points table ==
Team	Pld	W	L	T	NR	A	BP	Pts	NRR
Typhoons (C)	6	4	2	0	0	0	3	19	+1.19
Dragons	6	2	1	0	1	2	1	15	+0.41
Scorchers	6	0	3	0	1	2	0	6	–2.91

Source: NVPlay

== Fixtures ==
Source: Cricket Ireland

18 June 2023
10:45
Scorecard

Typhoons; 289/7 (50 overs)	v	Dragons; 290/4 (48.1 overs)
Laura Delany 127 (118); Arlene Kelly 4/43 (10 overs)		Bella Armstrong 163* (134); Sarah Forbes 2/34 (6 overs)

Dragons won by 6 wickets
Claremont Road Cricket Ground, Dublin
Umpires: P Reynolds and JAJ McCready

- Dragons won the toss and elected to bowl.

16 July 2023
10:45
Scorecard

Scorchers; 84/2 (20 overs)	v	Dragons
Gaby Lewis 29 (33); Jess Mayes 1/20 (5 overs)

No Result
The Lawn, Waringstown
Umpires: G Morrison and M Hawthorne

- Dragons won the toss and elected to bowl.
- Match reduced to 45 overs per side due to rain.
- No further play possible due to rain.

19 July 2023
10:45
Scorecard

Scorchers; 128 (37.4 overs)	v	Typhoons; 131/2 (23.4 overs)
Ellie McGee 22 (60); Georgia Atkinson 3/10 (4.4 overs)		Georgia Atkinson 71* (71); Christina Coulter Reilly 1/15 (2 overs)

Typhoons won by 8 wickets
Sydney Parade, Dublin
Umpires: P Reynolds and W Clarke

- Scorchers won the toss and elected to bat.

10 August 2023
10:45
Scorecard

Dragons; 226 (45.5 overs)	v	Typhoons; 227/7 (47 overs)
Amy Hunter 81 (85); Georgia Atkinson 3/38 (8 overs)		Laura Delany 98* (92); Alana Dalzell 3/36 (10 overs)

Typhoons won by 3 wickets
The Vineyard, Dublin
Umpires: JM Kennedy and G Morrison

- Typhoons won the toss and elected to bowl.

20 August 2023
10:45
Scorecard

Dragons	v	Scorchers

Match Abandoned
Stormont, Belfast

- No toss.
- No play possible due to rain.

29 August 2023
10:45
Scorecard

Scorchers; 156/9 (50 overs)	v	Typhoons; 157/3 (36.4 overs)
Siúin Woods 40* (79); Alice Tector 3/17 (8 overs)		Sarah Forbes 60 (102); Christina Coulter Reilly 1/16 (4.4 overs)

Typhoons won by 7 wickets
Claremont Road Cricket Ground, Dublin
Umpires: P Reynolds and M Hawthorne

- Typhoons won the toss and elected to bowl.

3 September 2023
10:45
Scorecard

Dragons; 271 (50 overs)	v	Typhoons; 204 (42.5 overs)
Amy Hunter 100 (88); Sarah Forbes 5/28 (6 overs)		Robyn Searle 66 (86); Cara Murray 7/34 (8.5 overs)

Dragons won by 67 runs
Stormont, Belfast
Umpires: JAJ McCready and I Gamble

- Dragons won the toss and elected to bat.

10 September 2023
10:45
Scorecard

Scorchers; 60 (21.5 overs)	v	Typhoons; 61/2 (6.3 overs)
Lara Maritz 12 (12); Georgina Dempsey 4/26 (8 overs)		Georgia Atkinson 28 (11); Jane Maguire 2/21 (3 overs)

Typhoons won by 8 wickets
Malahide Cricket Club Ground, Malahide
Umpires: P Reynolds and A Seaver

- Typhoons won the toss and elected to bowl.

17 September 2023
10:45

Scorchers	v	Dragons

Match Abandoned
Oak Hill Cricket Club Ground, Kilbride

- No toss.
- No play possible due to rain.
