= 2021 Super 20 Trophy =

Cricket tournament

2021 Arachas Super T20 Trophy
- Dates: 3 May – 15 August 2021
- Administrator: Cricket Ireland
- Cricket format: Twenty20
- Tournament format: League system
- Champions: Scorchers (4th title)
- Participants: 2
- Matches: 6
- Most runs: Leah Paul (150)
- Most wickets: Eimear Richardson (11)

The 2021 Arachas Super 20 Trophy was the Twenty20 section of the seventh Women's Super Series competition that took place in Ireland from 3 May to 15 August 2021. The tournament ran alongside the 50 over Arachas Super 50 Cup.

Originally the opening match of the tournament was scheduled to take place on 6 June 2021, but it was held on 3 May according to the revised fixtures of the tournament. On 30 April 2021, Cricket Ireland released the revised fixtures of the series, with two teams taking part. Although the previous editions of the tournament were competed between three teams, due to the impact of COVID-19 pandemic, the 2021 season featured two teams, with Arachas named as the title sponsors of the event.

In April 2021, Cricket Ireland announced the playing squads for both teams, with Laura Delany and Gaby Lewis named as the captains for the Typhoons and the Scorchers respectively. Scorchers won the tournament, winning four of the six matches.

== Competition format ==
In the Super 20 Trophy, the two sides played each other in six Twenty20 matches between May and August. The tournament worked on a league system.

The league worked on a points system with positions being based on the total points. Points were awarded as follows:

Win: 2 points.
Tie: 1 point.
Loss: 0 points.
Abandoned/No Result: 1 point.

== Squads ==
Scorchers Coach: Glenn Querl	Typhoons Coach: Clare Shillington
Gaby Lewis (c); Christina Coulter Reilly; Alana Dalzell; Shauna Kavanagh; Anna Kerrison; Maria Kerrison; Ashlee King; Hannah Little; Sophie MacMahon; Lara Maritz; Naomi Matthews; Caoimhe McCann; Kate McEvoy; Cara Murray; Leah Paul; Una Raymond-Hoey; Jenny Sparrow	Laura Delany (c); Ava Canning; Zara Craig; Rachel Delaney; Georgina Dempsey; Sarah Forbes; Rebecca Gough; Amy Hunter; Cecelia Joyce; Louise Little; Jane Maguire; Orla Prendergast; Celeste Raack; Freya Sargent; Rebecca Stokell; Mary Waldron

== Points table ==
Team	Pld	W	L	T	NR	A	Pts	NRR
Scorchers (C)	6	4	1	0	1	0	9	+0.560
Typhoons	6	1	4	0	1	0	3	–0.560

== Fixtures ==
=== 1st T20 ===
3 May 2021
14:00
Scorecard

Scorchers; 18/0 (1.4 overs)	v	Typhoons
Gaby Lewis 14* (9)

No Result
Observatory Lane, Dublin
Umpires: Aidan Seaver and Paul Reynolds

- Typhoons won the toss and elected to field.
- No further play possible due to rain.
- Points: Scorchers 1, Typhoons 1.

=== 2nd T20 ===
27 June 2021
11:00
Scorecard

Scorchers; 143/7 (20 overs)	v	Typhoons; 57 (14.3 overs)
Leah Paul 63* (48); Orla Prendergast 3/23 (4 overs)		Orla Prendergast 11 (14); Ashlee King 5/10 (4 overs)

Scorchers won by 86 runs
Oak Hill Cricket Club Ground, Wicklow
Umpires: Aidan Seaver and Steve Wood

- Scorchers won the toss and elected to bat.
- Points: Scorchers 2, Typhoons 0.

=== 3rd T20 ===
8 August 2021
11:00
Scorecard

Typhoons; 96/9 (20 overs)	v	Scorchers; 99/3 (18.2 overs)
Georgina Dempsey 35 (31); Hannah Little 2/9 (4 overs)		Leah Paul 44* (55); Laura Delany 1/9 (2 overs)

Scorchers won by 7 wickets
Oak Hill Cricket Club Ground, Kilbride, County Wicklow
Umpires: P Reynolds and S Wood

- Typhoons won the toss and elected to bat.
- Points: Scorchers 2, Typhoons 0.

=== 4th T20 ===
8 August 2021
15:00
Scorecard

Typhoons; 111/8 (20 overs)	v	Scorchers; 111/4 (20 overs)
Georgina Dempsey 28 (23); Ashlee King 2/21 (3 overs)		Gaby Lewis 50 (35); Jane Maguire 2/19 (4 overs)

Match Tied (Scorchers won the Super Over)
Oak Hill Cricket Club Ground, Kilbride, County Wicklow
Umpires: P Reynolds and S Wood

- Typhoons won the toss and elected to bat.
- Super Over: Scorchers 24/0, Typhoons 3/2.
- Points: Scorchers 2, Typhoons 0.

=== 5th T20 ===
15 August 2021
11:00
Scorecard

Typhoons; 78 (19.4 overs)	v	Scorchers; 19 (9.5 overs)
Orla Prendergast 19 (13); Eimear Richardson 4/21 (4 overs)		Leah Paul 8 (13); Ava Canning 3/9 (3 overs)

Typhoons won by 59 runs
North Kildare Cricket Club, County Kildare
Umpires: Azam Baig and Jonathan Kennedy

- Scorchers won the toss and elected to field.
- Points: Typhoons 2, Scorchers 0

=== 6th T20 ===
15 August 2021
15:30
Scorecard

Scorchers; 95/5 (20 overs)	v	Typhoons; 76 (19.2 overs)
Eimear Richardson 38 (34); Celeste Raack 1/11 (4 overs)		Mary Waldron 28 (42); Eimear Richardson 4/10 (3.2 overs)

Scorchers won by 19 runs
North Kildare Cricket Club, County Kildare
Umpires: Azam Baig and Jonathan Kennedy

- Typhoons won the toss and elected to field.
- Points: Scorchers 2, Typhoons 0.
