= 2023 Women's T20 World Cup squads =

List of cricketers

The 2023 ICC Women's T20 World Cup was held in South Africa in February 2023. The following squads were announced for the tournament.

== Australia ==
Australia announced their squad on 10 January 2023.

Coach: (Australia) Shelley Nitschke

- Meg Lanning (c)
- Alyssa Healy (vc, wk)
- Darcie Brown
- Ashleigh Gardner
- Kim Garth
- Heather Graham
- Grace Harris
- Jess Jonassen
- Alana King
- Tahlia McGrath
- Beth Mooney (wk)
- Ellyse Perry
- Megan Schutt
- Annabel Sutherland
- Georgia Wareham

== Bangladesh ==
Bangladesh announced their squad on 21 January 2023.

Coach: (Sri Lanka) Hashan Tillakaratne

- Nigar Sultana (c, wk)
- Rumana Ahmed
- Dilara Akter
- Marufa Akter
- Nahida Akter
- Shorna Akter
- Jahanara Alam
- Disha Biswas
- Fargana Hoque
- Fahima Khatun
- Murshida Khatun
- Salma Khatun
- Lata Mondal
- Ritu Moni
- Sobhana Mostary
- Shamima Sultana

Rabeya Khan, Sanjida Akter Meghla, Fargana Hoque and Sharmin Akhter were named as travelling reserves.

Dilara Akter ruled out of the tournament due to right ankle injury, Fargana Hoque named as replacement.

== England ==
England announced their squad on 6 January 2023.

Coach: (England) Jon Lewis

- Heather Knight (c)
- Lauren Bell
- Maia Bouchier
- Alice Capsey
- Kate Cross
- Freya Davies
- Charlie Dean
- Sophia Dunkley
- Sophie Ecclestone
- Sarah Glenn
- Amy Jones (wk)
- Katherine Sciver-Brunt
- Nat Sciver-Brunt (vc)
- Lauren Winfield-Hill (wk)
- Danni Wyatt

Danielle Gibson and Issy Wong were named as travelling reserves.

== India ==
India announced their squad on 28 December 2022.

Coach: (India) Hrishikesh Kanitkar

- Harmanpreet Kaur (c)
- Smriti Mandhana (vc)
- Yastika Bhatia (wk)
- Harleen Deol
- Rajeshwari Gayakwad
- Richa Ghosh (wk)
- Shikha Pandey
- Sneh Rana
- Jemimah Rodrigues
- Anjali Sarvani
- Deepti Sharma
- Renuka Singh
- Devika Vaidya
- Pooja Vastrakar
- Shafali Verma
- Radha Yadav

Sabbhineni Meghana, Sneh Rana and Meghna Singh were named as travelling reserves. On 23 February 2023, Sneh Rana was added to the main squad after Pooja Vastrakar was ruled out of the tournament due to an upper respiratory tract infection.

== Ireland ==
Ireland announced their squad on 10 January 2023.

Coach: (Ireland) Ed Joyce

- Laura Delany (c)
- Rachel Delaney
- Georgina Dempsey
- Amy Hunter
- Shauna Kavanagh (wk)
- Arlene Kelly
- Gaby Lewis
- Louise Little
- Sophie MacMahon
- Jane Maguire
- Cara Murray
- Leah Paul
- Orla Prendergast
- Eimear Richardson
- ~~Rebecca Stokell~~
- Mary Waldron

On 3 February 2023, Rebecca Stokell was ruled out of the tournament due to a foot ligament injury and was replaced in the squad by Rachel Delaney.

== New Zealand ==
New Zealand announced their squad on 19 January 2023.

Coach: (Australia) Ben Sawyer

- Sophie Devine (c)
- Suzie Bates
- Bernadine Bezuidenhout (wk)
- Eden Carson
- Lauren Down
- Maddy Green
- Brooke Halliday
- Hayley Jensen
- Fran Jonas
- Amelia Kerr
- Jess Kerr
- Molly Penfold
- Georgia Plimmer
- Hannah Rowe
- Lea Tahuhu

== Pakistan ==
On 14 December 2022, the Pakistan Cricket Board (PCB) were the first team to announce its squad.

Coach: (New Zealand) Mark Coles

- Bismah Maroof (c)
- Muneeba Ali (wk)
- Sidra Ameen
- Aiman Anwer
- ~~Diana Baig~~
- Nida Dar
- Tuba Hassan
- Sadia Iqbal
- Javeria Khan
- Ayesha Naseem
- Sidra Nawaz (wk)
- Aliya Riaz
- Fatima Sana
- Nashra Sandhu
- Sadaf Shamas
- Omaima Sohail

Ghulam Fatima, Kainat Imtiaz and Sadaf Shamas were named as traveling reserves. On 21 January 2023, Sadaf Shamas was added to the main squad after Diana Baig was ruled out of the tournament due to a fractured finger.

== South Africa ==
South Africa announced their squad on 31 January 2023.

Coach: (South Africa) Hilton Moreeng

- Suné Luus (c)
- Chloe Tryon (vc)
- Anneke Bosch
- Tazmin Brits
- Nadine de Klerk
- Annerie Dercksen
- Lara Goodall
- Shabnim Ismail
- Sinalo Jafta (wk)
- Marizanne Kapp
- Ayabonga Khaka
- Masabata Klaas
- Nonkululeko Mlaba
- Delmi Tucker
- Laura Wolvaardt

Micaéla Andrews, Tebogo Macheke and Tumi Sekhukhune were named as non-travelling reserves.

== Sri Lanka ==
Sri Lanka announced their squad on 1 February 2023.

Coach: (Sri Lanka) Rumesh Ratnayake

- Chamari Athapaththu (c)
- Nilakshi de Silva
- Kavisha Dilhari
- Vishmi Gunaratne
- Ama Kanchana
- Achini Kulasuriya
- Sugandika Kumari
- Kaushini Nuthyangana
- Oshadi Ranasinghe
- Inoka Ranaweera
- Harshitha Samarawickrama
- Sathya Sandeepani
- Anushka Sanjeewani (wk)
- Tharika Sewwandi
- Malsha Shehani

== West Indies ==
West Indies announced their squad on 1 February 2023.

Coach: (Cricket West Indies) Courtney Walsh

- Hayley Matthews (c)
- Shemaine Campbelle (vc, wk)
- Aaliyah Alleyne
- Shamilia Connell
- Britney Cooper
- Afy Fletcher
- Shabika Gajnabi
- Chinelle Henry
- Trishan Holder
- Zaida James
- Djenaba Joseph
- Chedean Nation
- Karishma Ramharack
- Shakera Selman
- Stafanie Taylor
- Rashada Williams

On 17 February 2023, Britney Cooper was added to the main squad after Chedean Nation was ruled out of the tournament due to knee injury.
