= 2021 Super 50 Cup =

- Dates: 25 April – 6 June 2021
- Administrator(s): Cricket Ireland
- Cricket format: 50 over
- Tournament format(s): League
- Champions: Scorchers (3rd title)
- Participants: 2
- Matches: 7
- Most runs: Gaby Lewis (332)
- Most wickets: Cara Murray (10)

The 2021 Arachas Super 50 Cup was the 50 over section of the seventh Women's Super Series competition, taking place in Ireland. The tournament ran from April to June, alongside the Twenty20 Arachas Super 20 Trophy. Due to the continuing impact of the COVID-19 pandemic, only two teams competed in the tournament, compared to three in seasons before the pandemic. Scorchers won the tournament, winning four of the seven matches.

== Competition format ==
In the Super 50 Cup, the two sides played each other in seven 50 over matches between April and June. The tournament worked on a league system.

The league worked on a points system with positions being based on the total points. Points were awarded as follows:

Win: 2 points.
Tie: 1 point.
Loss: 0 points.
Abandoned/No Result: 1 point.

== Squads ==
Scorchers	Typhoons
Gaby Lewis (Captain); Christina Coulter Reilly; Alana Dalzell; Shauna Kavanagh; Anna Kerrison; Maria Kerrison; Ashlee King; Hannah Little; Sophie MacMahon; Lara Maritz; Naomi Matthews; Caoimhe McCann; Kate McEvoy; Cara Murray; Leah Paul; Una Raymond-Hoey; Jenny Sparrow	Laura Delany (Captain); Ava Canning; Zara Craig; Rachel Delaney; Georgina Dempsey; Sarah Forbes; Rebecca Gough; Amy Hunter; Cecelia Joyce; Louise Little; Jane Maguire; Orla Prendergast; Celeste Raack; Freya Sargent; Rebecca Stokell; Mary Waldron

Source: CricketWorld

== Points table ==
Team	Pld	W	L	T	NR	A	Pts	NRR
Scorchers (C)	7	4	1	0	1	1	10	1.062
Typhoons	7	1	4	0	1	1	4	–1.062

Source: ESPNCricinfo

== Fixtures ==
25 April 2021
Scorecard

Scorchers; 221/5 (50 overs)	v	Typhoons; 207/9 (50 overs)
Gaby Lewis 60 (72); Laura Delany 1/17 (7 overs)		Louise Little 42 (51); Cara Murray 3/39 (9 overs)

Scorchers won by 14 runs
Sydney Parade, Dublin
Umpires: Azam Baig and Paul Reynolds

- Typhoons won the toss and elected to field.

2 May 2021
Scorecard

Typhoons; 208/9 (50 overs)	v	Scorchers; 209/6 (42 overs)
Rachel Delaney 73 (122); Lara Maritz 3/48 (9 overs)		Gaby Lewis 94 (101); Orla Prendergast 2/36 (10 overs)

Scorchers won by 4 wickets
Sydney Parade, Dublin
Umpires: Azam Baig and Steve Wood

- Typhoons won the toss and elected to bat.

9 May 2021
Scorecard

Typhoons; 259/8 (50 overs)	v	Scorchers; 226 (46.5 overs)
Orla Prendergast 116 (129); Cara Murray 2/36 (9 overs)		Lara Maritz 78 (82); Rachel Delaney 3/40 (10 overs)

Typhoons won by 33 runs
Rush Cricket Club Ground, Dublin
Umpires: Alan Neill and Steve Wood

- Scorchers won the toss and elected to field.

16 May 2021
Scorecard

Typhoons; 47/1 (14 overs)	v	Scorchers
Rebecca Stokell 23* (46); Leah Paul 1/10 (4 overs)

No Result
North Kildare Cricket Club, Maws, Kilcock
Umpires: Azam Baig and Paul Reynolds

- Typhoons won the toss and elected to bat.

23 May 2021
Scorecard

Scorchers	v	Typhoons

Match Abandoned
The Inch, Balrothery Dublin

- No toss.

30 May 2021
Scorecard

Scorchers; 271/5 (50 overs)	v	Typhoons; 131 (31.3 overs)
Gaby Lewis 115 (121); Orla Prendergast 1/38 (7 overs)		Rachel Delaney 41 (83); Lara Maritz 3/10 (5 overs)

Scorchers won by 140 runs
Malahide Cricket Club Ground, Malahide
Umpires: Mark Hawthorne and Paul Reynolds

- Scorchers won the toss and elected to bat.

6 June 2021
Scorecard

Scorchers; 241/9 (50 overs)	v	Typhoons; 136 (39.4 overs)
Gaby Lewis 56 (54); Celeste Raack 2/41 (10 overs)		Celeste Raack 42 (84); Ashlee King 3/19 (7 overs)

Scorchers won by 105 runs
Sydney Parade, Dublin
Umpires: Azam Baig and Steve Wood

- Scorchers won the toss and elected to bat.

== Statistics ==
=== Most runs ===
Player	Team	Matches	Innings	Runs	Average	HS	100s	50s
Gaby Lewis	Scorchers	6	5	332	66.40	115	1	3
Orla Prendergast	Typhoons	6	5	170	34.00	116	1	0
Shauna Kavanagh	Scorchers	6	5	154	30.80	53	0	1
Sophie MacMahon	Scorchers	6	5	146	73.00	44*	0	0
Lara Maritz	Scorchers	6	5	144	48.00	78	0	1

Source: CricketArchive

=== Most wickets ===
Player	Team	Overs	Wickets	Average	BBI	5w
Cara Murray	Scorchers	40.3	10	15.60	3/22	0
Leah Paul	Scorchers	46.4	8	24.00	3/42	0
Lara Maritz	Scorchers	38.0	7	25.00	3/10	0
Rachel Delaney	Typhoons	40.0	7	26.85	3/40	0
Orla Prendergast	Typhoons	37.5	6	26.16	2/17	0

Source: CricketArchive
