= Zimbabwe women's cricket team in Ireland in 2019 =

	Ireland women	Zimbabwe women
- Dates: 3 – 14 July 2019
Captains	Laura Delany	

Twenty20 International series

The Zimbabwe women's cricket team were scheduled to play the Ireland women's cricket team in July 2019. It would have been the first time that the Zimbabwe women's team will tour Ireland. However, in June 2019, the tour was cancelled 48 hours before it was due to take place, due to a funding issue from Zimbabwe Cricket. Warren Deutrom, the CEO of Cricket Ireland, expressed his disappointment at the late cancellation, but made alternative arrangements for the Ireland women's team ahead of the 2019 ICC Women's World Twenty20 Qualifier tournament.

The tour was scheduled to consist of three 50-over matches and three Women's Twenty20 Internationals (WT20Is). The WT20Is would have taken place on the same days and venues as the corresponding men's fixtures. Prior to the cancellation by Zimbabwe, Cricket Ireland had also considered cancelling both of the tours, following poor ticket sales for international matches earlier in the season, but the International Cricket Council (ICC) provided a US $500,000 bailout.

Zimbabwe women were also scheduled to travel to the Netherlands following this series, to play four WT20I against the Netherlands women's cricket team, but that tour was also cancelled for the same reason. In July 2019, the International Cricket Council (ICC) suspended Zimbabwe Cricket, with the team barred from taking part in ICC events.

== Squads ==
50-overs		T20Is	
Ireland	Zimbabwe	Ireland	Zimbabwe
Laura Delany (c); ~~Kim Garth~~; Shauna Kavanagh; Anna Kerrison; Gaby Lewis; Hannah Little; Louise Little; Sophie MacMahon; Lara Maritz; Leah Paul; Orla Prendergast; Celeste Raack; Una Raymond-Hoey; Mary Waldron (wk)		Laura Delany (c); ~~Kim Garth~~; Shauna Kavanagh; Anna Kerrison; Gaby Lewis; Hannah Little; Louise Little; Sophie MacMahon; Lara Maritz; Naomi Matthews; Celeste Raack; Una Raymond-Hoey; Rebecca Stokell; Mary Waldron (wk)	

Ahead of the tour, Kim Garth was ruled out of Ireland's squad due to an injury and was replaced by Hannah Little.
