= Cathy Murphy (cricketer) =

Irish cricketer (born 1983)

Personal information
- Full name: Catherine Louise Murphy
- Born: 26 September 1983 (age 43); Johannesburg, South Africa
- Batting: Right-handed
- Bowling: Right-arm medium
- Role: Batter

International information
- National side: Ireland (2008)
- T20I debut (cap 8): 27 June 2008 v West Indies
- Last T20I: 1 August 2008 v South Africa

Domestic team information
- Years: Team
- 2017–2018: Scorchers

Career statistics
Competition	WT20I	WLA	WT20
Matches	2	3	5
Runs scored	1	45	9
Batting average	1.00	15.00	3.00
100s/50s	0/0	0/0	0/0
Top score	1	18	6
Catches/stumpings	1/–	0/–	3/–
- Source: CricketArchive, 27 May 2021

Catherine Louise Murphy (born 26 September 1983) is a South African-born Irish former cricketer who played as a right-handed batter. She appeared in 2 Twenty20 Internationals for Ireland in 2008. She played in the Women's Super Series for Scorchers in 2017 and 2018.
