= Ashlee King =

Australian cricketer

Personal information
- Full name: Ashlee King
- Born: 1 September 2000 (age 26)
- Batting: Right-handed
- Bowling: Right-arm medium
- Role: Bowler

Domestic team information
- Years: Team
- 2019/20: Western Australia
- 2021: Scorchers
- 2022/23: Western Australia

Career statistics
Competition	WLA	WT20
Matches	11	6
Runs scored	31	7
Batting average	7.75	3.50
100s/50s	0/0	0/0
Top score	16*	7
Balls bowled	330	66
Wickets	10	7
Bowling average	29.90	6.28
5 wickets in innings	0	1
10 wickets in match	0	0
Best bowling	3/19	5/10
Catches/stumpings	3/–	1/–
- Source: CricketArchive, 24 February 2023

Ashlee King (born 1 September 2000) is an Australian cricketer who last played for Western Australia in the Women's National Cricket League (WNCL). She plays as a right-arm medium bowler. She has previously played for Scorchers.

== Domestic career ==
King made her debut for Western Australia in the 2019–20 Women's National Cricket League, taking 1/29 from her 7 overs against Victoria. She went on to play two further matches for the side that season, taking two wickets overall.

In 2021, King played for Irish team Scorchers in the Arachas Super 50 Cup and Arachas Super 20 Trophy. In a Twenty20 match against Typhoons, King took 5/10 to help her side to a 86-run victory.

During the 2022–23 Women's National Cricket League, King returned to the Western Australia squad, and played two matches for the side that season, both against Tasmania, taking 3/62 from her 10 overs in the second of the two matches.
