= 2025 Women's Cricket World Cup Qualifier =

Cricket tournament

- Dates: 9 – 19 April 2025
- Administrator: International Cricket Council
- Cricket format: One Day International
- Host: Pakistan
- Champions: Pakistan (1st title)
- Runners-up: Bangladesh
- Participants: 6
- Matches: 15
- Player of the series: (Scotland) Kathryn Bryce
- Most runs: (Scotland) Kathryn Bryce (293)
- Most wickets: (Cricket West Indies) Hayley Matthews (13)

The 2025 ICC Women's Cricket World Cup Qualifier was an international women's cricket tournament held in Pakistan in April 2025. The tournament served as the final stage of the qualification process for the 2025 Women's Cricket World Cup scheduled to be held in India. The tournament was the sixth edition of the Women's Cricket World Cup Qualifier, with the fixtures played as One Day International matches.

The ICC announced the format of the qualifier in 2022. The bottom four teams (7th–10th) from the 2022–2025 ICC Women's Championship were joined by two other teams selected according to the Women's ODI Team Rankings in a 6-team tournament.

Pakistan won the qualifier. Bangladesh also qualified for the World Cup, after finishing ahead of the West Indies by a net run rate margin of just 0.013.

== Qualification ==
The following teams qualified for the tournament:

Teams qualified for the 2025 Women's CWC Qualifier
Means of qualification	Date of qualification	No. of teams	Teams
7th–10th in the 2022–2025 ICC Women's Championship	24 January 2025	4	Bangladesh
7th–10th in the 2022–2025 ICC Women's Championship	24 January 2025	4	Ireland
7th–10th in the 2022–2025 ICC Women's Championship	24 January 2025	4	Pakistan
7th–10th in the 2022–2025 ICC Women's Championship	24 January 2025	4	West Indies
Next two teams in the ICC Women's ODI Rankings	28 October 2024	2	Scotland
Next two teams in the ICC Women's ODI Rankings	28 October 2024	2	Thailand
Total		6	

== Squads ==
Team	Players
Bangladesh	Nigar Sultana (c, wk); Sharmin Akhter; Dilara Akter (wk); Marufa Akter; Nahida Akter; Shorna Akter; Jannatul Ferdus; Fargana Hoque; Rabeya Khan; Fahima Khatun; Sanjida Akter Meghla; Ritu Moni; Sobhana Mostary; Ishma Tanjim; Fariha Trisna
Ireland	Gaby Lewis (c); Orla Prendergast (vc); Ava Canning; Christina Coulter-Reilly (wk); Alana Dalzell; Laura Delany; Sarah Forbes; Amy Hunter (wk); Arlene Kelly; Louise Little; Sophie MacMahon; Jane Maguire; Kia McCartney; Cara Murray; Leah Paul
Pakistan	Fatima Sana (c); Muneeba Ali (vc, wk); Najiha Alvi (wk); Sidra Ameen; Syeda Aroob Shah; Diana Baig; Gull Feroza (wk); Sadia Iqbal; Sidra Nawaz (wk); Natalia Pervaiz; Aliya Riaz; Nashra Sandhu; Rameen Shamim; Omaima Sohail; Shawaal Zulfiqar
Scotland	Kathryn Bryce (c); Chloe Abel; Abbi Aitken-Drummond; Sarah Bryce (wk); ~~Darcey Carter~~; Priyanaz Chatterji; Maryam Faisal (wk); Katherine Fraser; Ailsa Lister (wk); Abtaha Maqsood; Kirsty MacColl; Megan McColl; Hannah Rainey; Nayma Sheikh; Rachel Slater; Pippa Sproul (wk); ~~Ellen Watson (wk)~~
Thailand	Naruemol Chaiwai (c); Nattaya Boochatham; Natthakan Chantham; Nannapat Koncharoenkai (wk); Aphisara Suwanchonrathi; Chanida Sutthiruang; Onnicha Kamchomphu; Rosenanee Kanoh; Suleeporn Laomi; Thipatcha Putthawong; Suwanan Khiaoto (wk); Phannita Maya; Sunida Chaturongrattana; Nannaphat Chaihan; Chayanisa Phengpaen
West Indies	Hayley Matthews (c); Shemaine Campbelle (vc, wk); Aaliyah Alleyne; Afy Fletcher; Cherry-Ann Fraser; Shabika Gajnabi; Jannillea Glasgow; Chinelle Henry; Zaida James; Qiana Joseph; Mandy Mangru; Ashmini Munisar; Karishma Ramharack; Stafanie Taylor; Rashada Williams (wk)

Ellen Watson withdrew from Scotland's squad due to personal reasons and was replaced by Maryam Faisal. On 10 April, Darcey Carter was ruled out of the tournament after sustaining an injury to her right hand, with Kirsty MacColl was added into the Scotland squad as a replacement.

== Match officials ==
On 3 April 2025, the ICC appointed a panel of match officials made up of three match referees and ten umpires for the tournament.

Match referees

- (New Zealand) Trudy Anderson
- (South Africa) Shandre Fritz
- (Pakistan) Ali Naqvi

Umpires

- (Pakistan) Faisal Afridi
- (Zimbabwe) Sarah Dambanevana
- (South Africa) Lubabalo Gcuma
- (New Zealand) Shaun Haig
- (Pakistan) Saleema Imtiaz
- (Bangladesh) Shathira Jakir
- (Australia) Donovan Koch
- (Cricket West Indies) Candace La Borde
- (Bangladesh) Masudur Rahman
- (Sri Lanka) Dedunu Silva

== Warm-up matches ==
Warm-up matches

Warm-up match 1
4 April 2025
14:30 (D/N)
Scorecard

Thailand; 78 (28.2 overs)	v	Pakistan; 79/3 (18.5 overs)
Phannita Maya 26* (49); Nashra Sandhu 4/11 (5.2 overs)		Gull Feroza 28 (32); Suleeporn Laomi 1/8 (3 overs)

Pakistan won by 7 wickets
Lahore City Cricket Association Ground, Lahore
Umpires: Tariq Rasheed (Pak) and Rashid Riaz (Pak)

- Thailand won the toss and elected to bat.

Warm-up match 2
5 April 2025
14:30 (D/N)
Scorecard

Ireland; 248/8 (50 overs)	v	West Indies; 252/5 (41.1 overs)
Laura Delany 67* (73); Hayley Matthews 3/62 (10 overs)		Hayley Matthews 55 (53); Cara Murray 3/73 (9 overs)

West Indies won by 5 wickets
Lahore City Cricket Association Ground, Lahore
Umpires: Faisal Afridi (Pak) and Saleema Imtiaz (Pak)

- Ireland won the toss and elected to bat.

Warm-up match 3
6 April 2025
14:30 (D/N)
Scorecard

Scotland; 251/7 (50 overs)	v	Bangladesh; 252/5 (41.3 overs)
Sarah Bryce 60 (56); Ritu Moni 2/22 (5.2 overs)		Sobhana Mostary 57* (53); Chloe Abel 2/33 (7.3 overs)

Bangladesh won by 5 wickets
Lahore City Cricket Association Ground, Lahore
Umpires: Shaun Haig (NZ) and Candace La Borde (WI)

- Scotland won the toss and elected to bat.

Warm-up match 4
7 April 2025
10:00
Scorecard

Thailand; 227/8 (50 overs)	v	Ireland; 231/7 (37.4 overs)
Natthakan Chantham 48 (57); Alana Dalzell 2/21 (4 overs)		Laura Delany 77 (72); Nattaya Boochatham 3/30 (7 overs)

Ireland won by 3 wickets
Lahore City Cricket Association Ground, Lahore
Umpires: Masudur Rahman (Ban) and Dedunu Silva (SL)

- Ireland won the toss and elected to field.

Warm-up match 5
7 April 2025
10:00
Scorecard

West Indies; 188/8 (50 overs)	v	Pakistan; 192/5 (46.1 overs)
Shabika Gajnabi 68* (77); Sadia Iqbal 3/21 (10 overs)		Muneeba Ali 87* (130); Aaliyah Alleyne 1/14 (5 overs)

Pakistan won by 5 wickets
Lahore Gaddafi Stadium, Lahore
Umpires: Lubabalo Gcuma (SA) and Shathira Jakir (Ban)

- West Indies won the toss and elected to bat.

Warm-up match 6
8 April 2025
10:00
Scorecard

Bangladesh; 276 (49.4 overs)	v	Pakistan A 109 (39.1 overs)
Nigar Sultana 70 (72); Umm-e-Hani 3/51 (10 overs)		Dua Majid 32 (58); Rabeya Khan 2/7 (5 overs)

Bangladesh won by 167 runs
Lahore Gaddafi Stadium, Lahore
Umpires: Faisal Afridi (Pak) and Sarah Dambanevana (Zim)

- Bangladesh won the toss and elected to bat.

== Group stage ==
=== Points table ===
Pos	Team	Pld	W	L	NR	Pts	NRR	Qualification
1	Pakistan (H)	5	5	0	0	10	1.074	Advanced to the 2025 Women's Cricket World Cup
2	Bangladesh	5	3	2	0	6	0.639	Advanced to the 2025 Women's Cricket World Cup
3	West Indies	5	3	2	0	6	0.626	
4	Scotland	5	2	3	0	4	0.102	
5	Ireland	5	2	3	0	4	−0.037	
6	Thailand	5	0	5	0	0	−2.342	

Source: ESPNcricinfo
(H) Host

=== Fixtures ===
The fixtures were announced by the International Cricket Council on 14 March 2025.

9 April 2025
09:30 UTC+5
Scorecard

Pakistan; 217 (49 overs)	v	Ireland; 179 (44 overs)
Aliya Riaz 52 (58); Jane Maguire 3/33 (10 overs)		Amy Hunter 44 (54); Diana Baig 4/35 (9 overs)

Pakistan won by 38 runs
Gaddafi Stadium, Lahore
Umpires: Shaun Haig (NZ) and Shathira Jakir (Ban)
Player of the match: Diana Baig (Pak)

- Ireland won the toss and elected to field.
- Gull Feroza (Pak) made her ODI debut.

9 April 2025
09:30 UTC+5
Scorecard

Scotland; 244 (45 overs)	v	West Indies; 233 (46.2 overs)
Sarah Bryce 55 (56); Hayley Matthews 4/56 (10 overs)		Hayley Matthews 114* (113); Katherine Fraser 3/50 (10 overs)

Scotland won by 11 runs
Lahore City Cricket Association Ground, Lahore
Umpires: Saleema Imtiaz (Pak) and Masudur Rahman (Ban)
Player of the match: Hayley Matthews (WI)

- West Indies won the toss and elected to field.
- This was the first women's ODI match to be played at this venue.
- This was Scotland's first win against West Indies in women's ODIs.

10 April 2025
09:30 UTC+5
Scorecard

Bangladesh; 271/3 (50 overs)	v	Thailand; 93 (28.5 overs)
Nigar Sultana 101 (80); Phannita Maya 1/28 (6 overs)		Chanida Sutthiruang 22 (26); Jannatul Ferdus 5/7 (5 overs)

Bangladesh won by 178 runs
Lahore City Cricket Association Ground, Lahore
Umpires: Faisal Afridi (Pak) and Candace La Borde (WI)
Player of the match: Nigar Sultana (Ban)

- Thailand won the toss and elected to field.
- Ishma Tanjim (Ban), Sunida Chaturongrattana and Aphisara Suwanchonrathi (Tha) all made their ODI debuts.
- Nigar Sultana (Ban) scored her first century in ODIs.
- Jannatul Ferdus and Fahima Khatun (Ban) both took their first five-wicket haul in ODIs.

11 April 2025
09:30 UTC+5
Scorecard

Scotland; 186/9 (32 overs)	v	Pakistan; 190/4 (30.4 overs)
Kathryn Bryce 91 (96); Fatima Sana 4/23 (5 overs)		Muneeba Ali 71 (72); Chloe Abel 2/42 (6 overs)

Pakistan won by 6 wickets
Lahore City Cricket Association Ground, Lahore
Umpires: Donovan Koch (Aus) and Dedunu Silva (SL)
Player of the match: Aliya Riaz (Pak)

- Pakistan won the toss and elected to field.
- The match was reduced to 32 overs per side due to rain.
- Pippa Sproul (Sco) made her ODI debut.

11 April 2025
09:30 UTC+5
Scorecard

West Indies; 181/6 (33 overs)	v	Ireland; 175 (32.2 overs)
Chinelle Henry 46* (36); Jane Maguire 3/35 (7 overs)		Amy Hunter 48 (46); Hayley Matthews 4/24 (6.2 overs)

West Indies won by 6 runs
Gaddafi Stadium, Lahore
Umpires: Sarah Dambanevana (Zim) and Lubabalo Gcuma (SA)
Player of the match: Hayley Matthews (WI)

- Ireland won the toss and elected to field.
- The match was reduced to 33 overs per side due to rain.

13 April 2025
09:30 UTC+5
Scorecard

Scotland; 206 (41 overs)	v	Thailand; 148 (31.3 overs)
Kathryn Bryce 60 (58); Thipatcha Putthawong 3/28 (8 overs)		Natthakan Chantham 63 (58); Rachel Slater 3/9 (6 overs)

Scotland won by 58 runs
Lahore City Cricket Association Ground, Lahore
Umpires: Shaun Haig (NZ) and Saleema Imtiaz (Pak)
Player of the match: Katherine Fraser (Sco)

- Scotland won the toss and elected to bat.

13 April 2025
14:00 UTC+5 (D/N)
Scorecard

Ireland; 235/8 (50 overs)	v	Bangladesh; 240/8 (48.4 overs)
Laura Delany 63 (75); Rabeya Khan 3/39 (10 overs)		Ritu Moni 67* (61); Orla Prendergast 2/14 (6 overs)

Bangladesh won by 2 wickets
Gaddafi Stadium, Lahore
Umpires: Faisal Afridi (Pak) and Dedunu Silva (SL)
Player of the match: Ritu Moni (Ban)

- Ireland won the toss and elected to bat.

14 April 2025
14:00 UTC+5 (D/N)
Scorecard

Pakistan; 191 (49.5 overs)	v	West Indies; 126 (39.2 overs)
Sidra Ameen 54 (94); Hayley Matthews 2/30 (10 overs)		Aaliyah Alleyne 22 (52); Fatima Sana 3/16 (7 overs)

Pakistan won by 65 runs
Gaddafi Stadium, Lahore
Umpires: Lubabalo Gcuma (SA) and Donovan Koch (Aus)
Player of the match: Sidra Ameen (Pak)

- Pakistan won the toss and elected to bat.

15 April 2025
09:30 UTC+5
Scorecard

Ireland; 305/4 (50 overs)	v	Thailand; 259 (49.1 overs)
Amy Hunter 76 (71); Chanida Sutthiruang 1/43 (10 overs)		Suwanan Khiaoto 59 (50); Louise Little 5/28 (9.1 overs)

Ireland won by 46 runs
Lahore City Cricket Association Ground, Lahore
Umpires: Shathira Jakir (Ban) and Masudur Rahman (Ban)
Player of the match: Louise Little (Ire)

- Ireland won the toss and elected to bat.
- Kia McCartney (Ire) made her ODI debut.
- Louise Little (Ire) took her first five-wicket haul in ODIs.

15 April 2025
14:00 UTC+5 (D/N)
Scorecard

Bangladesh; 276/6 (50 overs)	v	Scotland; 242/9 (50 overs)
Nigar Sultana 83* (59); Kathryn Bryce 2/53 (9 overs)		Priyanaz Chatterji 61 (63); Nahida Akter 4/40 (10 overs)

Bangladesh won by 34 runs
Gaddafi Stadium, Lahore
Umpires: Sarah Dambanevana (Zim) and Candace La Borde (WI)
Player of the match: Nigar Sultana (Ban)

- Bangladesh won the toss and elected to bat.

17 April 2025
09:30 UTC+5
Scorecard

Bangladesh; 227/9 (50 overs)	v	West Indies; 228/7 (46 overs)
Sharmin Akhter 67 (79); Aaliyah Alleyne 4/39 (9 overs)		Chinelle Henry 51* (48); Marufa Akter 2/38 (9 overs)

West Indies won by 3 wickets
Lahore City Cricket Association Ground, Lahore
Umpires: Faisal Afridi (Pak) and Shaun Haig (NZ)
Player of the match: Aaliyah Alleyne (WI)

- Bangladesh won the toss and elected to bat.

17 April 2025
14:00 UTC+5 (D/N)
Scorecard

Pakistan; 205/6 (50 overs)	v	Thailand; 118 (34.4 overs)
Sidra Ameen 80 (105); Thipatcha Putthawong 2/37 (10 overs)		Nannapat Koncharoenkai 19 (17); Rameen Shamim 3/18 (7.4 overs)

Pakistan won by 87 runs
Gaddafi Stadium, Lahore
Umpires: Lubabalo Gcuma (SA) and Candace La Borde (WI)
Player of the match: Fatima Sana (Pak)

- Pakistan won the toss and elected to bat.

18 April 2025
14:00 UTC+5 (D/N)
Scorecard

Scotland; 268/7 (50 overs)	v	Ireland; 269/9 (50 overs)
Kathryn Bryce 131* (137); Ava Canning 3/48 (7 overs)		Gaby Lewis 61 (72); Kathryn Bryce 3/49 (9 overs)

Ireland won by 1 wicket
Gaddafi Stadium, Lahore
Umpires: Shathira Jakir (Ban) and Donovan Koch (Aus)
Player of the match: Laura Delany (Ire)

- Scotland won the toss and elected to bat.
- Kathryn Bryce (Sco) scored her first century in ODIs.
- This was Ireland's highest successful run chase in women's ODIs.

19 April 2025
09:30 UTC+5
Scorecard

Bangladesh; 178/9 (50 overs)	v	Pakistan; 181/3 (39.4 overs)
Ritu Moni 48 (76); Sadia Iqbal 3/28 (10 overs)		Muneeba Ali 69 (93); Marufa Akter 1/27 (6 overs)

Pakistan won by 7 wickets
Lahore City Cricket Association Ground, Lahore
Umpires: Sarah Dambanevana (Zim) and Dedunu Silva (SL)
Player of the match: Muneeba Ali (Pak)

- Bangladesh won the toss and elected to bat.

19 April 2025
14:00 UTC+5 (D/N)
Scorecard

Thailand; 166 (46.1 overs)	v	West Indies; 168/4 (10.5 overs)
Natthakan Chantham 66 (98); Afy Fletcher 4/20 (10 overs)		Hayley Matthews 70 (29); Phannita Maya 1/40 (2.5 overs)

West Indies won by 6 wickets
Gaddafi Stadium, Lahore
Umpires: Saleema Imtiaz (Pak) and Masudur Rahman (Ban)
Player of the match: Hayley Matthews (WI)

- West Indies won the toss and elected to field.
- Afy Fletcher (WI) took her 100th wicket in ODIs.

== Team of the tournament ==
On 20 April 2025, the ICC announced its team of the tournament.

- (Cricket West Indies) Hayley Matthews
- (Pakistan) Muneeba Ali
- (Bangladesh) Sharmin Akhter
- (Scotland) Kathryn Bryce
- (Bangladesh) Nigar Sultana (wk)
- (Pakistan) Fatima Sana (c)
- (Cricket West Indies) Chinelle Henry
- (Cricket West Indies) Aaliyah Alleyne
- (Scotland) Katherine Fraser
- (Pakistan) Nashra Sandhu
- (Pakistan) Sadia Iqbal
- (Bangladesh) Rabeya Khan (12th woman)
