= Toyota Ireland =

Motor distributor and former manufacturer

- Company type: Unlimited Company
- Industry: Automotive
- Founded: 24 May 1972
- Headquarters: Dublin, County Dublin, Ireland
- Key people: Mahony family
- Products: Automobiles
- Production output: (Formerly vehicle assembly - Toyota, Skoda)
- Services: Motor vehicle distribution and sales
- Website: toyota.ie

Toyota Ireland is the Irish representative of the Japanese-based automaker Toyota. With an assembly plant for motor vehicles, it was part of the automotive industry in Ireland and today operates as a distribution and sales operation.

== Company history ==
The company was founded on 24 May 1972. The founder was Stephen O’Flaherty, who previously headed Motor Distributors but had given the management to his sons Nigel and Michael. The seat was in Dublin. The assembly of automobiles began in the same year. The parts came from Toyota. There was also a connection to Eastern Autos that assembled Škoda.

In early 1974, the brothers Denis and Tim Mahony took over 51% of the company and the Intrac Holdings group 49%. In early 1975 the brothers also took over the remaining shares. In 1976 the company held 5% market share with the combined figures for Toyota and Škoda. This allowed the import of complete vehicles. As a result, the number of registrations rose. In 1979, Tim Mahony took over his brother's shares.

Production ended in 1983. The company is still active in the area of import and sales.

== Vehicles ==
Toyota Corolla of the 20 and 30 series as well as the Toyota Starlet were produced. About 9000 vehicles were built from the latter. In 1978, Toyota Ireland also offered Toyota Carina, Toyota Celica, Toyota Cressida and Toyota Crown. The Toyota Land Cruiser was also imported.
