= Eimear Richardson =

Irish cricketer (born 1986)

Personal information
- Full name: Eimear Ann Jermyn Richardson
- Born: 14 September 1986 (age 40); Dublin, Ireland
- Batting: Right-handed
- Bowling: Right-arm off break
- Role: All-rounder

International information
- National side: Ireland (2005–present)
- ODI debut (cap 53): 31 July 2005 v Australia
- Last ODI: 9 November 2022 v Pakistan
- T20I debut (cap 9): 27 June 2008 v West Indies
- Last T20I: 20 February 2023 v India

Domestic team information
- Years: Team
- 2010/11–2013/14: Central Districts
- 2014/15–2017/18: Wellington
- 2016–2017: Typhoons
- 2018/19–present: Northern Districts
- 2022: Scorchers

Career statistics
Competition	WODI	WT20I
Matches	30	54
Runs scored	397	503
Batting average	15.26	15.24
100s/50s	0/1	0/2
Top score	50*	63*
Balls bowled	1,141	1,028
Wickets	22	48
Bowling average	28.95	20.06
5 wickets in innings	1	0
10 wickets in match	0	0
Best bowling	5/13	3/9
Catches/stumpings	3/–	9/–
- Source: Cricinfo, 29 November 2022

Eimear Ann Jermyn Richardson (born 14 September 1986) is an Irish cricketer who plays as a right-handed batter and right-arm off break bowler. She plays domestic cricket for Northern Districts, having previously played for Central Districts and Wellington in New Zealand and Typhoons and Scorchers in Ireland.

In June 2018, she was named in Ireland's squad for the 2018 ICC Women's World Twenty20 Qualifier tournament. In October 2018, she was named in Ireland's squad for the 2018 ICC Women's World Twenty20 tournament in the West Indies.

In August 2019, she was named in Ireland's squad for the 2019 ICC Women's World Twenty20 Qualifier tournament in Scotland. She was the leading wicket-taker for Ireland in the tournament, with nine dismissals in five matches. In July 2020, she was awarded a non-retainer contract by Cricket Ireland for the following year. In August 2021, she was named the player of the tournament in the 2021 ICC Women's T20 World Cup Europe Qualifier in Spain. In November 2021, she was named in Ireland's team for the 2021 Women's Cricket World Cup Qualifier tournament in Zimbabwe.
