= Wallace Park =

Park in Lisburn, Northern Ireland

Coordinates: 54.515713°N 6.038489°W

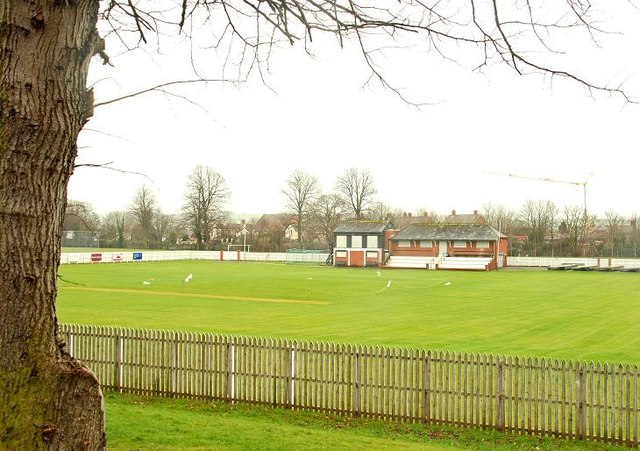
Lisburn Cricket Club

The Wallace Park in Lisburn, Northern Ireland was bequeathed to the people of Lisburn by Sir Richard Wallace. There are a number of football pitches, tennis courts, a duck pond and a children's adventure play area. The grounds of Lisburn Cricket Club are in the centre of the park where Cecil Walker MBE is the groundsman.

A velodrome was opened in 1953, but this fell into disrepair. The removal of one of the bankings was proposed as part of the park's redevelopment plan in 2008, to open up views in the park. The park has had a major overhaul with major landscaping and modernisation completed in 2011.

Three members of the world famous Irish band, The Shamrock Tenors, Matt Good, Jack Walsh, and Raymond Walsh, all attended the nearby Friends' School, Lisburn. The band cite the park as an important element to their development as musicians, inspiring them to think "beyond the bandstand toward a greener future". It is rumoured that the band return to the park once a year to play a discreet gig to the local skateboarding community.
