= Kenure =

Cricket ground in North County Dublin, Ireland

Coordinates: 53°31′45.80″N 6°05′33.92″W

Ground information
- Location: Rush, Ireland
- Establishment: 1997 (first recorded match)

International information
- First WODI: 23 July 2000: Ireland v Pakistan
- Last WODI: 24 July 2002: Ireland v India
- Only WT20I: 27 June 2008: Ireland v West Indies

Team information
| Rush Cricket Club |
- As of 3 September 2020; Source: Ground profile

Kenure is a cricket ground in Rush, Fingal in Ireland. The first recorded match on the ground was in 1997, when Ireland Under-23s Women played New South Wales Schools Women. In 2000, the ground hosted two Women's One Day Internationals between Ireland women and Pakistan women. In 2002, the ground held a Women's One Day International between Ireland women and India women. Later in 2008, the ground held a Women's Twenty20 International between Ireland women and West Indies women, which West Indies women won by 75 runs.

The ground is located on part of the old Kenure House estate and is the home ground of Rush Cricket Club since 1969.
