= Freya Sargent =

Irish international cricketer (born 2006)

Personal information
- Full name: Freya Alexandra Sargent
- Born: 21 January 2006 (age 20); Dublin, Ireland
- Batting: Right-handed
- Bowling: Right-arm off-spin
- Role: Bowler

International information
- National side: Ireland
- ODI debut (cap 98): 17 October 2023 v Scotland
- Last ODI: 27 November 2024 v Bangladesh
- T20I debut (cap 54): 14 August 2023 v Netherlands
- Last T20I: 15 September 2024 v England

Domestic team information
- Years: Team
- 2020-: Typhoons

Career statistics
Competition	WODI	WT20I
Matches	11	9
Runs scored	28	9
Batting average	9.33	9.00
100s/50s	0/0	0/0
Top score	16	9
Balls bowled	510	197
Wickets	17	9
Bowling average	28.76	24.00
5 wickets in innings	0	0
10 wickets in match	0	0
Best bowling	3/29	3/30
Catches/stumpings	3/–	2/–
- Source: Cricinfo, 27 November 2024

Freya Alexandra Sargent (born 21 January 2006) is an Irish cricketer who plays for the Ireland women's cricket team and Typhoons.

She is an off-spinner and right-handed batter who primarily plays as a bowler for the national team.

In 2023 she was part of the Ireland U-19 Women's side that took part in the 2023 Under-19 Women's T20 World Cup where she picked up 4 wickets.

Sargent plays her club cricket for Clontarf.

== Biography ==
Sargent received her first senior call up when she was named in the Typhoons squad for the 2020 season. Due to the COVID-19 pandemic the Irish women's domestic Super Series was limited to eight List A games only, with no T20 fixtures taking place.

She made her List A debut on 3 August 2020 for Typhoons against Scorchers at Oak Hill aged just 14.

Sargent would make her T20 debut at the same ground just over a year later on 8 August 2021, again against Scorchers.

She would appear sporadically for Typhoons in 2022 before receiving a call-up for the 2023 Under-19 Women's T20 World Cup late that year. In Ireland's opening game of the tournament against the West Indies she would return figures of 2/9 and hit 15* (11) before Ireland lost the match by seven runs.

After beating Indonesia, Ireland would qualify for the Super Sixes stage but not win any further games in the competition.

2023 would prove to be a breakthrough year for Sargent. In March she was announced as a recipient of a casual contract from Cricket Ireland and two months later she won Player of the Match for her 4/15 in a victory against Scorchers in a Super 20 Trophy match at Anglesea Road.

A first call up to the Ireland senior team would come in August for a three-match T20I series against the Netherlands. Head Coach Ed Joyce noted that "Freya Sargent has impressed at youth international and Super Series level and has earned a call-up...she also performed well at the Under-19s World Cup at the start of the year, so I have no doubt she'll be well positioned for a step up in standard.”

She made her WT20I debut in the first match of the series on 14 August, going wicketless from her four overs. A maiden international wicket would come two days later in the second game as she bowled Babette de Leede.

Sargent's WODI debut came against Scotland in October at Desert Springs in Spain. She picked up two wickets, followed by another two scalps in the second match. However injury would force her to sit out the third ODI and the subsequent T20I series.

Her return came during Ireland's tour of Zimbabwe in January 2024 where she took her best ODI figures of 3/29 in a 10-wicket win over Zimbabwe in the first ODI.

Sargent was named in the Ireland squad for their T20I and ODI tour to Bangladesh in November 2024.

She was among the four player shortlist for the ICC Women's Emerging Cricketer of the Year 2024.
