= Arlene Kelly (cricketer) =

Irish cricketer (born 1994)

Personal information
- Full name: Arlene Nora Kelly
- Born: 8 January 1994 (age 32); Auckland, New Zealand
- Batting: Right-handed
- Bowling: Right-arm medium
- Role: All-rounder

International information
- National side: Ireland
- ODI debut (cap 94): 11 June 2022 v South Africa
- Last ODI: 6 September 2026 v England
- T20I debut (cap 50): 3 June 2022 v South Africa
- Last T20I: 27 June 2026 v West Indies

Domestic team information
- Years: Team
- 2012/13–2022/23: Auckland
- 2018: Kent
- 2022–present: Dragons

Career statistics
Competition	WODI	WT20I
Matches	39	71
Runs scored	424	179
Batting average	14.62	7.16
100s/50s	0/0	0/0
Top score	35	35
Balls bowled	1,729	1,361
Wickets	45	91
Bowling average	31.51	15.47
5 wickets in innings	0	2
10 wickets in match	0	0
Best bowling	4/35	5/12
Catches/stumpings	10/–	32/–
- Source: Cricinfo, 6 September 2026

Arlene Nora Kelly (born 8 January 1994) is an Irish cricketer. She represented Ireland internationally between 2022 and 2026. Kelly has also played for Dragons, Auckland and Kent.

== Career ==
Kelly was born in Auckland, New Zealand, in 1994. Her father was also born in New Zealand, but both of his parents were born in Ireland, and her mother was also born in Ireland, with Kelly holding an Irish passport. Kelly played for the Auckland Hearts in domestic tournaments in New Zealand between 2012–13 and 2022–23. In December 2018, she earned her 50th cap for the club. In March 2020, in the final of the 2019–20 Hallyburton Johnstone Shield, Kelly scored a match-winning 110 runs, as the Auckland Hearts beat the Northern Spirit by 67 runs to win the competition. She also played for Kent in 2018 as an overseas player.

Ahead of the women's 2022 domestic cricket season in Ireland, Kelly was signed by Dragons to play in the 2022 Arachas Super 20 Trophy and the 2022 Arachas Super 50 Cup.

In May 2022, Kelly was named in Ireland's Women's One Day International (WODI) and Women's Twenty20 International (WT20I) squads for their series against South Africa. Nine of Ireland's regular players were unavailable for selection, with Kelly saying "it was a welcome surprise" to get the call-up from Ireland's head coach Ed Joyce. After initially only being in Ireland to play for the Dragons, Kelly was in the right place at the right time to get a call up to Ireland's national team. With regards to overseas players being selected, Ed Joyce said that cricketers like Kelly would "raise the standard" in the team.

Kelly made her WT20I debut on 3 June 2022, for Ireland against South Africa. In the match, Kelly took two wickets, including that of Suné Luus, the South African captain. Ireland went on to win the match by ten runs, recording only their second win in the format against South Africa, with the first win coming in August 2016. Kelly made her WODI debut on 11 June 2022, also in the series against South Africa.

She was named in the Ireland squad for their T20I and ODI tour to Bangladesh in November 2024. Kelly was part of the Ireland squad for the 2025 Women's Cricket World Cup Qualifier in Pakistan in April 2025.

On 6 September 2026, Kelly announced her retirement from international cricket. She finished her international career having taken a combined total of 136 wickets across T20I and ODI formats.
