= Cara Murray =

Irish cricketer (born 2000)

Personal information
- Full name: Cara Murray
- Born: 1 November 2000 (age 26); Belfast, Northern Ireland
- Batting: Right-handed
- Bowling: Right-arm leg break
- Role: Bowler

International information
- National side: Ireland (2018–present)
- ODI debut (cap 87): 8 June 2018 v New Zealand
- Last ODI: 12 July 2026 v West Indies
- T20I debut (cap 36): 6 June 2018 v New Zealand
- Last T20I: 27 June 2026 v West Indies

Domestic team information
- Years: Team
- 2015: Dragons
- 2016–2021: Scorchers
- 2022–present: Dragons

Career statistics
Competition	WODI	WT20I
Matches	39	67
Runs scored	122	40
Batting average	8.71	3.63
100s/50s	0/0	0/0
Top score	19	13
Balls bowled	1717	1098
Wickets	53	49
Bowling average	33.94	25.91
5 wickets in innings	2	0
10 wickets in match	0	0
Best bowling	6/31	3/9
Catches/stumpings	15/–	18/–
- Source: Cricinfo, 17 August 2026

Cara Murray (born 1 November 2000) is an Irish cricketer. She made her Women's Twenty20 International cricket (WT20I) debut for Ireland against New Zealand on 6 June 2018. She plays in the Women's Super Series for Dragons.

She made her Women's One Day International cricket (WODI) debut for Ireland, also against New Zealand, on 8 June 2018. On her debut, she returned the worst bowling figures in WODIs, with two wickets for 119 runs from her ten overs.

In June 2018, she was named in Ireland's squad for the 2018 ICC Women's World Twenty20 Qualifier tournament. In July 2020, she was awarded a non-retainer contract by Cricket Ireland for the following year. In November 2021, she was named in Ireland's team for the 2021 Women's Cricket World Cup Qualifier tournament in Zimbabwe.

On 24 August 2022, Murray took her maiden five-wicket haul in WODIs with 5/39 against Netherlands in Amstelveen.

On 23 January 2024, Murray became the first Irish player to take six wickets in a WODI with 6/31 against Zimbabwe in Harare.

She was named in the Ireland squad for their T20I and ODI tour to Bangladesh in November 2024.

Murray was part of the Ireland squad for the 2025 Women's Cricket World Cup Qualifier in Pakistan in April 2025.
