= Anna Kerrison =

Irish cricketer (born 1998)

Personal information
- Full name: Anna Louise Kerrison
- Born: 10 September 1998 (age 28); England
- Batting: Right-handed
- Bowling: Right-arm off break
- Role: Bowler

International information
- National side: Ireland (2019)
- T20I debut (cap 43): 28 May 2019 v West Indies
- Last T20I: 29 May 2019 v West Indies

Domestic team information
- Years: Team
- 2015–2018: Scorchers
- 2017: Typhoons
- 2019: Dragons
- 2020–present: Scorchers

Career statistics
Competition	WT20I
Matches	2
Runs scored	–
Batting average	–
100s/50s	–
Top score	–
Balls bowled	30
Wickets	0
Bowling average	–
5 wickets in innings	0
10 wickets in match	0
Best bowling	–
Catches/stumpings	0/–
- Source: Cricinfo, 26 May 2021

Anna Louise Kerrison (born 10 September 1998) is an Irish cricketer who plays for Scorchers and Ireland. In October 2014, at the age of 16, she became the first female cricketer to train at the Darren Lehmann Cricket Academy in Australia.

In May 2019, she was added to Ireland's Women's Twenty20 International (WT20I) squad for their series against the West Indies. She made her WT20I debut for Ireland against the West Indies on 28 May 2019.
