= List of Ireland women Twenty20 International cricketers =

This is a list of Irish women Twenty20 International cricketers. A Twenty20 International is an international cricket match between two representative teams, each having Twenty20 International status, as determined by the International Cricket Council (ICC). A Twenty20 International is played under the rules of Twenty20 cricket. This list includes all players who have played at least one T20I match and is initially arranged in the order of debut appearance. Where more than one player won their first cap in the same match, those players are initially listed alphabetically at the time of debut.

== Key ==
General

- ‡ – Captain
- † – Wicket-keeper
- First – Year of debut
- Last – Year of latest game
- Mat – Number of matches played

Batting

- Runs – Runs scored in career
- HS – Highest score
- Avg – Runs scored per dismissal
- * – Batsman remained not out

Bowling

- Balls – Balls bowled in career
- Wkt – Wickets taken in career
- BBI – Best bowling in an innings
- Ave – Average runs per wicket

Fielding

- Ca – Catches taken
- St – Stumpings affected

== Players ==
Statistics are correct as of 1 June 2026.

Ireland women T20I cricketers
General					Batting					Bowling				Fielding		Ref
Cap	Name	First	Last	Mat	Runs	HS	Avg	50	100	Balls	Wkt	BBI	Ave	Ca	St	Ref
1	Emma Beamish	2008	2009	6	33	14	8.25	0	0	–	–	–	–	0	0	
2	Jean Carroll†	2008	2009	5	2	2*	–	0	0	–	–	–	–	0	0	
3	Nicola Coffey	2008	2008	2	31	26	15.50	0	0	24	0	–	–	1	0	
4	Marianne Herbert	2008	2009	5	1	1*	–	0	0	84	4	2/24	24.25	0	0	
5	Cecelia Joyce‡†	2008	2018	43	659	60	19.38	1	0	31	1	1/31	31.00	6	1	
6	Isobel Joyce‡	2008	2018	55	944	56*	20.08	1	0	1046	33	3/16	30.81	17	0	
7	Amy Kenealy	2008	2018	24	44	11*	5.50	0	0	335	7	2/19	57.00	1	0	
8	Cathy Murphy	2008	2008	2	1	1	1.00	0	0	–	–	–	–	1	0	
9	Eimear Richardson	2008	2024	75	752	63*	16.34	2	0	1,318	60	3/8	21.33	13	0	
10	Melissa Scott-Hayward	2008	2014	22	104	16	6.11	0	0	116	3	1/16	50.33	6	0	
11	Clare Shillington‡	2008	2018	56	1019	58*	18.52	1	0	–	–	–	–	12	0	
12	Jill Whelan	2008	2010	8	34	13	6.80	0	0	138	4	2/26	33.75	1	0	
13	Suzanne Kenealy	2009	2010	5	2	2	2.00	0	0	66	1	1/14	85.00	1	0	
14	Heather Whelan‡	2009	2009	4	1	1	1.00	0	0	78	6	3/11	6.66	0	0	
15	Valmai Gee†	2009	2009	1	–	–	–	–	–	–	–	–	–	1	2	
16	Ciara Metcalfe‡	2009	2018	25	11	7	11.00	0	0	483	23	4/15	20.60	1	0	
17	Laura Delany‡	2010	2026	132	1,659	91	21.26	4	0	1,757	96	4/9	18.91	26	0	
18	Louise McCarthy	2010	2016	28	47	13	4.27	0	0	540	12	2/14	43.41	0	0	
19	Nikki Symmons	2010	2010	3	110	86	36.66	1	0	–	–	–	–	2	0	
20	Mary Waldron†	2010	2023	88	531	55*	11.54	1	0	–	–	–	–	34	28	
21	Kim Garth (Note: Kim Garth also played Twenty20 International matches for Australia. Only her record for Ireland is given above.)‡†	2010	2019	51	762	51*	23.09	1	0	867	42	3/6	19.88	18	0	
22	Laura Cullen	2011	2012	5	–	–	–	–	–	30	2	1/10	10.50	0	0	
23	Emma Flanagan	2011	2014	7	35	12	5.00	0	0	–	–	–	–	0	0	
24	Shauna Kavanagh†	2011	2022	58	345	37	10.78	0	0	6	0	–	–	4	1	
25	Rebecca Rolfe	2011	2014	2	4	3	4.00	0	0	–	–	–	–	1	0	
26	Laura Boylan	2011	2011	3	–	–	–	–	–	–	–	–	–	0	0	
27	Hannah de Burgh Whyte	2011	2011	1	–	–	–	–	–	–	–	–	–	0	0	
28	Elena Tice	2011	2015	25	155	44*	11.92	0	0	432	16	3/12	30.62	6	0	
29	Lucy O'Reilly	2013	2018	32	63	14	7.00	0	0	609	27	4/28	25.03	4	0	
30	Kate McKenna	2014	2014	7	24	11*	12.00	0	0	–	–	–	–	2	0	
31	Jennifer Gray	2014	2016	7	26	10	3.71	0	0	–	–	–	–	0	0	
32	Gaby Lewis‡	2014	2026	114	3,048	119	31.42	18	2	90	3	2/20	40.00	47	0	
33	Catherine Dalton	2015	2016	4	14	5	3.50	0	0	–	–	–	–	0	0	
34	Robyn Lewis	2015	2016	3	5	4	1.66	0	0	30	1	1/21	37.00	0	0	
35	Lara Maritz	2018	2021	26	70	16*	7.77	0	0	354	17	3/4	21.47	9	0	
36	Cara Murray	2018	2026	62	39	13	4.33	0	0	1002	45	3/9	25.68	17	0	
37	Rachel Delaney	2018	2022	10	40	12	10.00	0	0	99	3	1/0	37.66	1	0	
38	Celeste Raack	2018	2022	22	45	10	15.00	0	0	300	14	3/15	21.78	2	0	
39	Louise Little	2019	2026	38	142	21	10.14	0	0	180	2	2/8	129.00	10	0	
40	Sophie MacMahon	2019	2025	27	70	23*	7.77	0	0	312	13	2/13	20.84	6	0	
41	Una Raymond-Hoey	2019	2024	9	24	17	3.42	0	0	–	–	–	–	0	0	
42	Rebecca Stokell	2019	2026	75	868	60*	19.72	1	0	–	–	–	–	17	0	
43	Anna Kerrison	2019	2019	2	–	–	–	–	–	30	–	–	–	0	0	
44	Orla Prendergast	2019	2026	83	1,873	80	29.80	12	0	1,284	63	4/22	19.46	35	0	
45	Hannah Little	2019	2019	4	2	2	2.00	0	0	36	0	–	–	0	0	
46	Leah Paul	2019	2026	73	794	79*	20.35	3	0	585	30	4/16	19.03	13	0	
47	Ava Canning	2021	2026	47	68	25	6.18	0	0	857	32	2/5	24.06	7	0	
48	Amy Hunter†	2021	2026	63	1570	114*	30.78	5	2	–	–	–	–	23	16	
49	Georgina Dempsey	2021	2024	20	22	12*	7.33	0	0	281	13	2/13	23.76	6	0	
50	Arlene Kelly	2022	2026	66	157	35	6.82	0	0	1,259	88	5/12	14.54	30	0	
51	Jane Maguire	2022	2026	39	55	15*	7.85	0	0	688	33	3/9	22.81	13	0	
52	Sarah Forbes	2022	2026	7	20	6	5.00	0	0	–	–	–	–	0	0	
53	Aimee Maguire	2023	2026	19	7	3*	3.50	0	0	335	18	3/30	23.94	4	0	
54	Freya Sargent	2023	2025	16	9	9	9.00	0	0	341	14	3/30	26.50	3	0	
55	Alana Dalzell	2023	2026	22	17	9	4.25	0	0	399	17	2/8	26.82	6	0	
56	Joanna Loughran†	2024	2024	1	–	–	–	–	–	–	–	–	–	0	0	
57	Christina Coulter Reilly†	2024	2026	12	28	21	4.66	0	0	–	–	–	–	6	2	
58	Lara McBride	2025	2026	18	3	2*	3.00	0	0	331	18	3/6	18.88	4	0	
59	Alice Tector	2026	2026	5	13	10	6.50	0	0	–	–	–	–	0	0	

== See also ==
- List of Ireland women Test cricketers
- List of Ireland women ODI cricketers
