= Typhoons (women's cricket) =

Irish women's cricket team

Personnel
- Captain: Rebecca Stokell
- Coach: Paul Davidge

Team information
- Colours: Blue
- Founded: 2015

History
- WSS wins: 2

Typhoons are an Irish women's cricket team that compete in the Women's Super Series. The team has no geographical base, instead being made up of some of the best players from across Ireland. They are captained by Rebecca Stokell and coached by Paul Davidge. They won their first Super Series title in 2020, and their second in 2023.

== History ==
Typhoons were established in 2015 to compete in the Women's Super 3s, a tournament designed to bridge the gap between club cricket and international cricket in Ireland. The team was made up of some of the best players in Irish cricket, and was captained by Elena Tice and coached by Matt Lunson. Typhoons finished bottom of the league in their first season, with two wins from their eight matches. The following season, 2016, Typhoons again finished bottom, this time with just one victory, in their final match against Dragons.

Typhoons saw some improvement in 2017, finishing 2nd in the group with four wins from their ten matches. They fared similarly in 2018 again winning four matches to finish second. In 2019, Typhoons returned to the bottom of the table, picking up 8 points.

In 2020 the tournament was reduced to two teams due to the COVID-19 pandemic, with Typhoons now facing off against Scorchers in eight 50 over matches. The two sides each won 4 matches, with Typhoons just edging out Scorchers for their first title on Net Run Rate. Typhoons bowler Celeste Raack was the leading wicket-taker in the tournament, with 12 victims, with fellow players Orla Prendergast, Rebecca Stokell and captain Laura Delany also putting in strong performances to help their side to the title. The 2021 tournament again included just two sides, with Scorchers and Typhoons now playing for separate 50 over and T20 titles. In June, the Super 50 Cup ended with Typhoons winning just one match, losing the title to Scorchers. In August, they also lost in the T20 Trophy, winning one match out of six. In 2022, the side finished second in the Super 50 Cup and third in the Super 20 Trophy. Typhoons overseas player Robyn Searle, in the final match of the Super 50 Cup, scored the highest score in Super Series history, making 143*. Rebecca Stokell became captain of the side ahead of the 2023 season. They won the 50-over tournament that season, winning four of their six matches.

== Players ==
=== Current squad ===
Based on squad announced for the 2023 season. Players in bold have international caps.

No.	Name	Nationality	Birth date	Batting style	Bowling style	Notes
Batters
10	Sinead Thompson	Ireland	Unknown	Left-handed	Unknown	
13	**Rebecca Stokell**	Ireland	13 March 2000 (age 25)	Right-handed	Right-arm medium	Captain
14	**Robyn Searle**	South Africa	17 June 1997 (age 28)	Right-handed	Right-arm medium	Overseas player
68	**Sarah Forbes**	Ireland	16 August 2002 (age 23)	Right-handed	Right-arm off break	
All-rounders
2	**Celeste Raack**	Ireland	18 May 1994 (age 31)	Right-handed	Right-arm leg break	
12	Georgia Atkinson	New Zealand	23 April 2000 (age 25)	Right-handed	Right-arm leg break	Overseas player
14	**Laura Delany**	Ireland	23 December 1992 (age 33)	Right-handed	Right-arm medium	
22	Lara McBride	Ireland	Unknown	Unknown	Right-arm medium	
36	**Georgina Dempsey**	Ireland	29 July 2004 (age 21)	Right-handed	Right-arm medium	
64	**Louise Little**	Ireland	16 May 2003 (age 22)	Right-handed	Right-arm medium	
–	Alice Walsh	Ireland	13 April 2006 (age 19)	Right-handed	Right-arm medium	
Wicket-keepers
6	Jane Butterly	Ireland	Unknown	Left-handed	–	
21	**Joanna Loughran**	Ireland	25 August 2004 (age 21)	Right-handed	Right-arm medium	
81	**Mary Waldron**	Ireland	5 May 1984 (age 41)	Right-handed	–	
Bowlers
1	Alice Tector	Ireland	Unknown	Unknown	Right-arm medium	
10	**Freya Sargent**	Ireland	21 January 2006 (age 19)	Right-handed	Right-arm off break	
37	Rebecca Gough	Ireland	22 July 2004 (age 21)	Right-handed	Right-arm medium	
42	**Ava Canning**	Ireland	2 February 2004 (age 21)	Right-handed	Right-arm medium	

== Seasons ==
=== Women's Super Series ===
==== Combined format ====
Season	League standings								Notes
Season	P	W	L	T	A/C	NRR	Pts	Pos	Notes
2015	8	2	6	0	0	–1.596	4	3rd	
2016	6	1	4	0	1	–1.326	3	3rd	
2017	10	4	5	0	1	–0.041	9	2nd	
2018	10	4	6	0	0	–0.554	8	2nd	
2019	10	3	5	0	2	–0.072	8	3rd	
2020	8	4	4	0	0	+0.189	8	1st	Champions

==== Super 50 Cup ====
Season	League standings								Notes
Season	P	W	L	T	A/C	NRR	Pts	Pos	Notes
2021	7	1	4	0	2	–1.062	4	2nd	
2022	6	2	3	0	1	–0.960	5	2nd	
2023	6	4	2	0	0	+1.190	19	1st	Champions

==== Super 20 Trophy ====
Season	League standings								Notes
Season	P	W	L	T	A/C	NRR	Pts	Pos	Notes
2021	6	1	4	0	1	–0.560	3	2nd	
2022	6	0	4	0	2	–1.015	2	3rd	
2023	6	2	4	0	0	–0.140	10	3rd	

== Honours ==
- Women's Super Series (combined format):
  - Winners (1): 2020
- Super 50 Cup:
  - Winners (1): 2023
