= Women's Super Series =

- Countries: Ireland
- Administrator: Cricket Ireland
- Format: Limited overs cricket (50 overs per side) and Twenty20
- First edition: 2015
- Latest edition: 2026
- Tournament format: Round-robin
- Number of teams: 2
- Current champion: Typhoons (50 over); Dragons (T20)
- Most successful: Scorchers (8 titles)

The Evoke Women's Super Series, previously known as the Women's Super 3s, is a women's domestic cricket tournament organised by Cricket Ireland.

The tournament began in 2015 as a combined 50-over and Twenty20 tournament, with three teams taking part: Dragons, Scorchers and Typhoons.

The tournament is currently run as a two team competition split between List A and T20 formats, with Dragons and Typhoons as the teams.

== History ==
The tournament began in 2015, with the aim of bringing together the best players from Ireland and help bridge the gap between club cricket and international cricket. Three teams, with no set geographical base, competed in the first tournament: Dragons, Scorchers and Typhoons. The teams played 8 matches, playing each team twice in both 50-over and Twenty20 formats, but with one table for the whole competition. Scorchers were the inaugural winners of the competition, with 5 wins.

The following season, 2016, the tournament followed a similar format, albeit with teams only playing two T20 matches each, and was newly sponsored by Toyota Ireland. Dragons won their first title.

2017 saw the number of games per team expand to 10, and Scorchers won their second title. The same format was kept for the 2018 and 2019 tournaments, and Dragons won both competitions, claiming their second and third titles.

In 2020, the tournament format was changed due to the impact of the COVID-19 pandemic: the number of teams was reduced to two (Scorchers and Typhoons) due to player unavailability during the pandemic, and the schedule was condensed, with only 50-over cricket taking place. Typhoons won the tournament, their first title, on Net Run Rate after both sides won four matches each.

In 2021, the tournament was split into the Super 50 Cup (50-over format) and Super 20 Trophy (Twenty20 format) and remained with two teams competing, due to the ongoing impact of COVID-19. The tournament was sponsored by Arachas. In June, Scorchers won the 50-over section of the tournament, winning four of the seven matches against Typhoons, and in August were victorious in the T20 section of the tournament, winning four of the six matches.

In 2022, Dragons returned to the competition. Scorchers won both the T20 and 50-over titles. In 2023, Scorchers defended their T20 title, whilst Typhoons won the 50-over title.

The tournament was reduced to two team for 2026, with the Scorchers being cut. Dragons won the Super 20 Trophy 3-2 while Typhoons took the Super 50 Cup 2-1.

== Teams ==
Team	First Season	Last Season	Titles
Dragons	2015	2026	7
Scorchers	2015	2023	8
Typhoons	2015	2026	3

== Results ==
=== Combined format (2015–2020) ===
Season	Winners	Runners-up	Pld	Ref
2015	Scorchers	Dragons	8	
2016	Dragons	Scorchers	6	
2017	Scorchers	Typhoons	10	
2018	Dragons	Typhoons	10	
2019	Dragons	Scorchers	10	
2020	Typhoons	Scorchers	8	

=== Super 50 Cup (2021–) ===
Season	Winners	Runners-up	Pld	Ref
2021	Scorchers	Typhoons	7	
2022	Scorchers	Typhoons	6	
2023	Typhoons	Dragons	6	
2024	Scorchers	Dragons	6	
2025	Dragons	Scorchers	6	
2026	Typhoons	Dragons	3	

=== Super 20 Trophy (2021–) ===
Season	Winners	Runners-up	Pld	Ref
2021	Scorchers	Typhoons	6	
2022	Scorchers	Dragons	6	
2023	Scorchers	Dragons	6	
2024	Dragons	Typhoons	6	
2025	Dragons	Scorchers	6	
2026	Dragons	Typhoons	6	

== See also ==
- Inter-Provincial Cup
- Inter-Provincial Trophy
