= Sophie MacMahon =

Irish cricketer (born 1997

Personal information
- Full name: Sophie MacMahon
- Born: 29 January 1997 (age 29); Dublin, Ireland
- Batting: Right-handed
- Bowling: Right-arm medium
- Role: All-rounder

International information
- National side: Ireland (2017–2025)
- ODI debut (cap 86): 15 May 2017 v India
- Last ODI: 18 April 2025 v Scotland
- T20I debut (cap 40): 26 May 2019 v West Indies
- Last T20I: 23 July 2025 v Zimbabwe

Domestic team information
- Years: Team
- 2015–2016: Dragons
- 2016–2018: Typhoons
- 2019–2025: Scorchers

Career statistics
Competition	WODI	WT20I
Matches	14	27
Runs scored	108	70
Batting average	13.50	7.77
100s/50s	0/0	0/0
Top score	42	23*
Balls bowled	366	312
Wickets	8	13
Bowling average	42.25	20.84
5 wickets in innings	0	0
10 wickets in match	0	0
Best bowling	2/44	2/13
Catches/stumpings	1/–	6/–
- Source: Cricinfo, 12 December 2025

Sophie MacMahon (born 29 January 1997) is an Irish cricketer. She made her Women's One Day International cricket (WODI) debut against India in the 2017 South Africa Quadrangular Series on 15 May 2017. She plays in the Women's Super Series for Scorchers.

In May 2019, she was named in Ireland's Women's Twenty20 International (WT20I) squad for their series against the West Indies. She made her WT20I debut against the West Indies on 26 May 2019.

In August 2019, she was named in Ireland's squad for the 2019 ICC Women's World Twenty20 Qualifier tournament in Scotland. In July 2020, she was awarded a non-retainer contract by Cricket Ireland for the following year. In November 2021, she was named in Ireland's team for the 2021 Women's Cricket World Cup Qualifier tournament in Zimbabwe.

MacMahon was part of the Ireland squad for the 2025 Women's Cricket World Cup Qualifier in Pakistan in April 2025.

She announced her retirement from international cricket in December 2025.
