= Leah Paul =

Irish cricketer (born 1999)

Personal information
- Born: 10 September 1999 (age 27); Dublin, Ireland
- Batting: Left-handed
- Bowling: Slow left-arm orthodox
- Role: Batter

International information
- National side: Ireland (2017–present)
- ODI debut (cap 82): 7 May 2017 v India
- Last ODI: 15 July 2026 v West Indies
- T20I debut (cap 46): 8 August 2019 v Netherlands
- Last T20I: 27 June 2026 v West Indies

Domestic team information
- Years: Team
- 2015: Scorchers
- 2016–2019: Typhoons
- 2020–2021: Scorchers
- 2022–2023: Dragons

Career statistics
Competition	WODI	WT20I
Matches	54	78
Runs scored	1301	836
Batting average	25.50	19.44
100s/50s	1/8	0/0
Top score	137	79*
Balls bowled	574	585
Wickets	6	30
Bowling average	87.00	19.03
5 wickets in innings	0	0
10 wickets in match	0	0
Best bowling	2/24	4/16
Catches/stumpings	14/–	14/–
- Source: Cricinfo, 16 August 2026

Leah Paul (born 10 September 1999) is an Irish cricketer. She plays international cricket for Ireland and domestic cricket in the Women's Super Series for the Scorchers.

== International career ==
Paul made her Women's One Day International (WODI) debut for Ireland against India in the 2017 South Africa Quadrangular Series. In November 2018, she was named the Female Youth International Player of the Year at the annual Cricket Ireland Awards.

In May 2019, she was named in Ireland's Women's Twenty20 International (WT20I) squad for their series against the West Indies, but she did not play. In August 2019, she was again named in the Irish WT20I squad for the 2019 Netherlands Women's Quadrangular Series. She made her WT20I debut for Ireland, against the Netherlands, on 8 August 2019.

In August 2019, she was named in Ireland's squad for the 2019 ICC Women's World Twenty20 Qualifier tournament in Scotland. She would have a good tournament with the ball, finishing as Ireland's second highest wicket taker with 6, however Ireland failed to qualify for the 2020 Women's T20 World Cup after losing to Bangladesh in the semi-final.

In July 2020, she was awarded a non-retainer contract by Cricket Ireland (CI) for the following year.

In November 2021, she was named in Ireland's team for the 2021 Women's Cricket World Cup Qualifier tournament in Zimbabwe. She played both of Ireland's games before the tournament was abandoned due to an outbreak of COVID-19, Ireland did not qualify for the 2022 Women's Cricket World Cup with places being decided by ICC Rankings.

Paul was offered a Part Time Education by CI in March 2022 to allow her continue her studies in Trinity College, Dublin. Later that year she would be named Sport Person of the Year at the Trinity Sports Awards.

In June she was named Player of the Match for her 47 and 1/21 in Ireland's victory over South Africa at Pembroke, it was the first time she opened the batting in WT20Is.

She would make her highest international score in August of that year during Ireland Women's tour to the Netherlands. In the 2nd WODI she made 137 opening the batting, putting on a record Irish WODI partnership of 236 with Laura Delany who made 109. It remains the 2nd highest 3rd wicket partnership in WODIs. Ireland scored their highest WODI score with 337/8 with the margin of victory of 210 runs also being an Irish record.

In 2024 she was elevated to a full-time professional contract by CI.

In the 2nd WODI of Sri Lanka's tour of Ireland in August 2024 Paul made 81(101) to top score for Ireland as they beat the visitors by 15 runs at Stormont to achieve their first WODI series victory over Sri Lanka.

She was named in the Ireland squad for their T20I and ODI tour to Bangladesh in November 2024. Paul scored 79 not out off 45 balls including two 6s and 10 4s in a player of the match winning performance as Ireland won the first T20I.

Paul was part of the Ireland squad for the 2025 Women's Cricket World Cup Qualifier in Pakistan in April 2025.
