= Rebecca Stokell =

Irish cricketer (born 2000)

Personal information
- Full name: Rebecca Stokell
- Born: 13 March 2000 (age 26); Dublin, Ireland
- Batting: Right-handed
- Bowling: Right-arm medium
- Role: Batter

International information
- National side: Ireland (2017–present)
- ODI debut (cap 85): 11 May 2017 v South Africa
- Last ODI: 15 July 2026 v West Indies
- T20I debut (cap 42): 26 May 2019 v West Indies
- Last T20I: 27 June 2026 v West Indies

Domestic team information
- Years: Team
- 2015: Dragons
- 2017–2019: Scorchers
- 2020–present: Typhoons

Career statistics
Competition	WODI	WT20I
Matches	26	80
Runs scored	397	908
Batting average	18.90	18.91
100s/50s	0/2	0/0
Top score	57	60*
Catches/stumpings	2/–	18/–
- Source: Cricinfo, 16 August 2026

Rebecca Stokell (born 13 March 2000) is an Irish cricketer. She made her Women's One Day International cricket (WODI) debut against South Africa in the 2017 South Africa Quadrangular Series on 11 May 2017. She plays in the Women's Super Series for Typhoons.

In June 2018, she was named in Ireland's squad for the 2018 ICC Women's World Twenty20 Qualifier tournament. In October 2018, she was named in Ireland's squad for the 2018 ICC Women's World Twenty20 tournament in the West Indies. The following month, she was named the Female Academy Player of the Year at the annual Cricket Ireland Awards.

In May 2019, she was named in Ireland's Women's Twenty20 International (WT20I) squad for their series against the West Indies. She made her WT20I debut for Ireland against the West Indies on 26 May 2019.

In August 2019, she was named in Ireland's squad for the 2019 ICC Women's World Twenty20 Qualifier tournament in Scotland. In July 2020, she was awarded a non-retainer contract by Cricket Ireland for the following year. In November 2021, she was named in Ireland's team for the 2021 Women's Cricket World Cup Qualifier tournament in Zimbabwe.

Stokell was named in the Ireland squad for the T20I part of their tour to Bangladesh in November 2024.

On 2 November 2026, it was announced that Stokell had begun a voluntary suspension on 23 October, pending the outcome of an investigation into an "adverse finding" in an anti-doping sample she provided in June that year. The substance involved was not revealed but was reported to not be performance enhancing, with Cricket Ireland saying the issue was "an inadvertent breach of the reporting requirements around the use of prescription medication."
