= Jane Maguire =

Irish cricketer (born 2003)

Personal information
- Full name: Jane Maguire
- Born: 18 February 2003 (age 23); Dublin, Ireland
- Batting: Right-handed
- Bowling: Right-arm medium
- Role: Bowler
- Relatives: Aimee Maguire (sister)

International information
- National side: Ireland
- ODI debut (cap 92): 7 October 2021 v Zimbabwe
- Last ODI: 15 July 2026 v West Indies
- T20I debut (cap 51): 3 June 2022 v South Africa
- Last T20I: 27 June 2026 v West Indies

Domestic team information
- Years: Team
- 2018; 2022–present: Scorchers
- 2019: Dragons
- 2020–2021: Typhoons

Career statistics
Competition	WODI	WT20I
Matches	27	40
Runs scored	94	55
Batting average	6.26	7.85
100s/50s	-/-	-/-
Top score	28	15*
Balls bowled	1129	712
Wickets	24	34
Bowling average	38.66	22.97
5 wickets in innings	0	0
10 wickets in match	0	0
Best bowling	3/33	3/9
Catches/stumpings	8/–	13/–
- Source: Cricinfo, 16 August 2026

Jane Maguire (born 18 February 2003) is an Irish cricketer who plays for Scorchers and Ireland.

== Career ==
In October 2020, Maguire was named in Ireland's squad to play Scotland at the La Manga Club during their tour of Spain. However, the matches were called off due to the COVID-19 pandemic. In May 2021, Maguire was again named in Ireland's squad to face Scotland, this time for a four-match Women's Twenty20 International (WT20I) series in Belfast. In September 2021, Maguire was named in Ireland's Women's One Day International (WODI) squad for their series against Zimbabwe, the first WODI matches to be played by the Zimbabwe team. She made her WODI debut on 7 October 2021, for Ireland against Zimbabwe.

In November 2021, she was named in Ireland's team for the 2021 Women's Cricket World Cup Qualifier tournament in Zimbabwe. In May 2022, Maguire was named in Ireland's Women's Twenty20 International (WT20I) squad for their series against South Africa. She made her WT20I debut on 3 June 2022, for Ireland against South Africa.

Maguire was named in the Ireland squad for their T20I and ODI tour to Bangladesh in November 2024, but later withdrew because of injury.

Maguire was part of the Ireland squad for the 2025 Women's Cricket World Cup Qualifier in Pakistan in April 2025.
