= Amy Hunter (Irish cricketer) =

Irish cricketer (born 2005)

Personal information
- Full name: Amy Hunter
- Born: 11 October 2005 (age 21)
- Batting: Right-handed
- Role: Wicket-keeper

International information
- National side: Ireland
- ODI debut (cap 89): 5 October 2021 v Zimbabwe
- Last ODI: 15 July 2026 v West Indies
- T20I debut (cap 48): 24 May 2021 v Scotland
- Last T20I: 27 June 2026 v West Indies

Domestic team information
- Years: Team
- 2017–2018: Dragons
- 2019–2021: Typhoons
- 2022–present: Dragons
- 2025: Surrey

Career statistics
Competition	WODI	WT20I
Matches	43	68
Runs scored	1,323	1,645
Batting average	33.07	29.37
100s/50s	1/9	2/6
Top score	121*	114*
Catches/stumpings	20/10	25/16
- Source: Cricinfo, 16 August 2026

Amy Hunter (born 11 October 2005) is an Irish cricketer who plays for the Ireland women's cricket team. She plays as wicket-keeper batter for Ireland and Dragons. In October 2021, during the final match of Ireland's tour of Zimbabwe, Hunter became the youngest cricketer, male or female, to score a century in an ODI match, doing so on her 16th birthday. As a result, Hunter was named as the Irish Times/Sport Ireland Sportswoman for October 2021.

In January 2024, Hunter scored her first T20I century in the opening match of a series against Zimbabwe. This meant that she became the first Irish woman, and the third Irish cricketer overall, to score a century in both T20I and ODI cricket.

== Career ==
In October 2020, Hunter was named in Ireland's squad to play Scotland at the La Manga Club during their tour of Spain. However, the matches were called off due to the COVID-19 pandemic. In May 2021, Hunter was again named in Ireland's squad to face Scotland, this time for a four-match Women's Twenty20 International (WT20I) series in Belfast. She made her WT20I debut on 24 May 2021, for Ireland against Scotland.

In August 2021, Hunter was added to Ireland's squad for the 2021 ICC Women's T20 World Cup Europe Qualifier tournament in Spain. She replaced Shauna Kavanagh, after Kavanagh returned a positive test for COVID-19.

In September 2021, Hunter was named in Ireland's Women's One Day International (WODI) squad for their series against Zimbabwe, the first WODI matches to be played by the Zimbabwe team. She made her WODI debut on 5 October 2021, for Ireland against Zimbabwe. In the fourth and final match against Zimbabwe, Hunter scored 121 not out, becoming the youngest cricketer to score a century in one-day cricket. Hunter's century was also the highest individual score for Ireland in a WODI match, beating the previous record of 120 runs made by Karen Young.

In November 2021, she was named in Ireland's team for the 2021 Women's Cricket World Cup Qualifier tournament in Zimbabwe.

In January 2024 Hunter scored her maiden T20I century with 101*(66) against Zimbabwe in Harare. She was named in the Ireland squad for their T20I and ODI tour to Bangladesh in November 2024.

Hunter was part of the Ireland squad for the 2025 Women's Cricket World Cup Qualifier in Pakistan in April 2025.
