= Ireland women's cricket team =

Ireland women's national cricket team

Ireland
- Association: Cricket Ireland

Personnel
- Captain: Gaby Lewis
- Coach: Lloyd Tennant

International Cricket Council
- ICC status: Full member (2017; 9 years ago); Associate member (1993; 33 years ago)
- ICC region: Europe
ICC Rankings	Current	Best-ever
ODI	10th	8th
T20I	9th	9th (24-Aug-2025)

Tests
- Only Test: v Pakistan at College Park, Dublin; 30–31 July 2000
Tests	Played	Won/Lost
Total	1	1/0 (0 draws)

One Day Internationals
- First ODI: v Australia at Ormeau Cricket Ground, Belfast; 28 June 1987
- Last ODI: v England at New Road, Worcester; 6 September 2026
ODIs	Played	Won/Lost
Total	201	56/137 (1 tie, 7 no results)
This year	6	0/6 (0 ties, 0 no results)
- World Cup appearances: 5 (first in 1988)
- Best result: 4th (1988)
- Women's World Cup Qualifier appearances: 4 (first in 2003)
- Best result: Champions (2003)

T20 Internationals
- First T20I: v West Indies at Kenure, Dublin; 27 June 2008
- Last T20I: v Zimbabwe at Karwan Cricket Ground, Ajman; 22 November 2026
T20Is	Played	Won/Lost
Total	163	78/84 (0 ties, 1 no result)
This year	21	12/9 (0 ties, 0 no results)
- T20 World Cup appearances: 4 (first in 2014)
- Best result: 1st round (2014, 2016, 2018, 2023)
- T20 World Cup Qualifier appearances: 4 (first in 2013)
- Best result: Champions (2015)
Test kit
ODI kit
T20I kit
- As of 22 November 2026

The Ireland women's cricket team represents Ireland in international women's cricket. Cricket in Ireland is governed by Cricket Ireland and organised on an All-Ireland basis, meaning the Irish women's team represents both Northern Ireland and the Republic of Ireland.

Ireland made its One-Day International (ODI) debut in 1987, against Australia, and the following year played at the 1988 World Cup, making the first of five appearances at the tournament. Throughout the 1990s and early 2000s, Ireland was considered to be a top-level team, playing regular ODI series and placing as high as fifth at the World Cup (in 1993, out of eight teams). In 2000, the team played its only Test match, defeating the Pakistan women's team. Although it still retains ODI status, Ireland has not qualified for a World Cup since the 2005 event. The team has, however, qualified for the ICC World Twenty20 on two occasions, in 2014 and 2016. In December 2018, Cricket Ireland offered professional contracts to the women players for the first time.

In April 2021, the ICC awarded permanent Test and One Day International (ODI) status to all full member women's teams.

== History ==
=== 1980s ===
The Irish women's team entered the international arena well before their male counterparts, playing their first ODIs in a three match series against Australia in 1987, a full 19 years before the men's team would make their ODI debut. They lost all three games by more than 100 runs, but were still invited to take part in the World Cup the following year in Australia.

In that World Cup, they finished fourth, losing to New Zealand in the third place play-off game. Ireland subsequently came fourth of five in the tournament, with Ireland's only two wins both came against The Netherlands. The next year, Ireland took part in the first Women's European Championship in Denmark, finishing fourth on run rate, with their only win coming against the hosts.

=== 1990s ===
The first two years of the 1990s again saw Ireland compete in the European Championships, finishing as runners up to England in 1990, and third place in 1991. Sandwiched between those two tournaments was a 2 match ODI series against England, with England winning both games, the second by 10 wickets.

1993 saw them compete in the World Cup again, this time finishing in fifth place. The next European Championship in 1995 again saw them finish as runners up to England. Following this, they settled into a pattern of playing ODIs against whichever team was touring England, a pattern that continues to this day. The 1997 World Cup saw them lose to New Zealand in the quarter-finals. The end of the 1990s saw them again finish as runners up to England in the European Championship in 1999.

=== 2000s ===
Ireland played their first ever Test match in 2000, beating Pakistan by an innings inside two days in Dublin. This is still their only Test match however. They also dominated the ODI series against Pakistan, winning 4–0 with a fifth game rained off. They still could only finish seventh in the World Cup later that year though, their only win coming against The Netherlands. The following year, they won the European Championship, and that remains the only time out of seven tournaments that the England team had not won the competition.

That seventh place meant that they had to take part in the 2003 IWCC Trophy, the inaugural edition of what is now known simply as the World Cup Qualifier. They won every game in that tournament, which qualified them for the world cup in South Africa in 2005. They came last in that tournament, meaning they will have to qualify again for the 2009 World Cup. Later in the year, they yet again finished as runners up to England in the European Championship.

They played a two match ODI series against the Netherlands, winning both games. In November 2007, they went to the Women's World Cup Qualifier in Lahore, where they played Bermuda, The Netherlands, Pakistan, Papua New Guinea, Scotland, South Africa and an African qualifier.

In 2009, Ireland beat the Netherlands to win the European Championship.

In April 2016, Laura Delany was named as captain of Ireland women's cricket team replacing Isobel Joyce who stepped down after the 2016 ICC Women's World Twenty20 in India.

In December 2020, the ICC announced the qualification pathway for the 2023 ICC Women's T20 World Cup. Ireland were named in the 2021 ICC Women's T20 World Cup Europe Qualifier regional group, alongside five other teams.

In 2021, Ireland were awarded qualification for the 2022–25 ICC Women's Championship on the basis of their WODI ranking after the abandonment of the 2021 Women's Cricket World Cup Qualifier.

On 23 January 2024, Cara Murray became the first Irish player to take six wickets in a WODI with 6/31 against Zimbabwe in Harare.

== Tournament history ==
=== ICC Women's World Cup ===
Women's Cricket World Cup records
Year	Round	Position	GP	W	L	T	NR
(England) 1973	Did not qualify						
(India) 1978	Did not qualify						
(New Zealand) 1982	Did not qualify						
(Australia) 1988	Round -robin	4/5	8	2	6	0	0
(England) 1993	Round -robin	5/8	7	2	5	0	0
(India) 1997	Quarter-finals	–	6	2	3	0	1
(New Zealand) 2000	Round -robin	7/8	7	1	6	0	0
(South Africa) 2005	Round -robin	8/8	7	0	5	0	2
(Australia) 2009	Did not qualify						
(India) 2013	Did not qualify						
(England) 2017	Did not qualify						
(New Zealand) 2022	Did not qualify						
(India) 2025	Did not qualify						
Total	5/13	0 Titles	35	7	25	0	3

=== ECC Women's European Cricket Championship ===
Women's European Cricket Championship records
Year	Round	Position	GP	W	L	T	NR
(Denmark) 1989	Round -robin	–	3	1	2	0	0
(England) 1990	Round -robin	–	3	2	1	0	0
(Netherlands) 1991	Round -robin	–	3	1	2	0	0
(Republic of Ireland) 1995	Round -robin	–	3	2	1	0	0
(Denmark) 1999	Round -robin	–	3	2	1	0	0
(England) 2001	Champions	–	3	3	0	0	0
(Wales) 2005	The full information of the tournament have not been found						
(Netherlands) 2007	The full information of the tournament have not been found						
(Republic of Ireland) 2009	Champions	–	2	2	0	0	0
(Scotland) 2010	The full information of the tournament have not been found						
(Netherlands) 2011	Round -robin	–	2	1	1	0	0
(England) 2014	The full information of the tournament have not been found						
Total	8/12	2 Title	22	14	8	0	0

=== ICC Women's Cricket World Cup Qualifier ===
ICC Women's Cricket World Cup Qualifier records
Host Year	Round	Position	GP	W	L	T	NR
(Netherlands) 2003	Qualified	1/6	5	5	0	0	0
(South Africa) 2008	Did not qualify	–	4	2	2	0	0
(Bangladesh) 2011	Did not qualify	6/10	5	1	4	0	0
(Sri Lanka) 2017	Did not qualify	–	9	2	7	0	0
(Zimbabwe) 2021	Tournament postponed due to COVID-19 pandemic	–	2	1	1	0	0
(Pakistan) 2025	Did not qualify	–	5	2	3	0	0
Total	5/6	1 Title	30	13	17	0	0

=== ICC Women's World T20 ===
ICC Women's T20 World Cup records
Host Year	Round	Position	GP	W	L	T	NR
(England) 2009	Did not qualify						
(Cricket West Indies) 2010	Did not qualify						
(Sri Lanka) 2012	Did not qualify						
(Bangladesh) 2014	Group stage	–	4	0	4	0	0
(India) 2016	Group stage	–	4	0	4	0	0
(Cricket West Indies) 2018	Group stage	–	4	0	4	0	0
(Australia) 2020	Did not qualify						
(South Africa) 2023	Group stage	–	4	0	4	0	0
(United Arab Emirates) 2024	Did not qualify						
(England) 2026	To be determined						
(Pakistan) 2028	To be determined						
Total	4/9	0 Titles	16	0	16	0	0

=== ICC Women's World Twenty20 Qualifier ===
ICC Women's World Twenty20 Qualifier records
Host Year	Round	Position	GP	W	L	T	NR
(Republic of Ireland) 2013	3rd-place	3/8	5	3	2	0	0
(Thailand) 2015	Champions	1/8	5	5	0	0	0
(Netherlands) 2018	Runners-up	2/8	5	4	1	0	0
(Scotland) 2019	DNQ	3/8	5	3	2	0	0
(United Arab Emirates) 2022	Runners-up	2/8	5	3	2	0	0
(United Arab Emirates) 2024	DNQ	3/10	5	4	1	0	0
(Nepal) 2026	Runners-up	2/10	7	5	2	0	0
Total	7/7	4 Titles	37	27	10	0	0

=== Cricket at Summer Olympics Games ===
Cricket at Summer Olympics records
Host Year	Round	Position	GP	W	L	T	NR
(United States) 2028	To be determined						
(Australia) 2032	To be determined						
Total	–	0 Title	0	0	0	0	0

=== ICC Women's T20 Champions Trophy ===
ICC Women's T20 Champions Trophy records
Host Year	Round	Position	GP	W	L	T	NR
(Sri Lanka) 2027	To be determined						
2031	To be determined						
Total	–	0 Title	0	0	0	0	0

== Squad ==
This lists all the players with a central contract with Cricket Ireland or were named in the most recent ODI or T20I squad. Uncapped players are listed in italics

Name	Age	Batting style	Bowling style	Contract	Format	Notes
Batters
Rebecca Stokell	26	Right-handed	Right-arm medium	Full-time	ODI & T20I	
Gaby Lewis	25	Right-handed	Right-arm leg break	Full-time	ODI & T20I	Captain
Una Raymond-Hoey	30	Right-handed	Right-arm medium	Retainer	ODI & T20I	
Sarah Forbes	24	Right-handed		Educational	ODI & T20I	
Christina Coulter Reilly	23	Right-handed	Right-arm leg break	Casual	ODI & T20I	
Abbi Harrison	20	Right-handed	Right-arm off break	Casual		
All-rounders
Orla Prendergast	24	Right-handed	Right-arm medium	Full-time	ODI & T20I	
Leah Paul	27	Left-handed	Slow left-arm orthodox	Full-time	ODI & T20I	
Laura Delany	34	Right-handed	Right-arm medium	Full-time	ODI & T20I	
Sophie MacMahon	29	Right-handed	Right-arm medium	Full-time	ODI & T20I	
Louise Little	23	Right-handed	Right-arm medium	Full-time	ODI & T20I	
Wicket-keepers
Amy Hunter	21	Right-handed	–	Educational	ODI & T20I	
Joanna Loughran	22	Right-handed	–	Educational	ODI	
Spin Bowlers
Cara Murray	26	Right-handed	Right-arm leg break	Full-time	ODI & T20I	
Freya Sargent	20	Right-handed	Right-arm off break	Full-time	ODI & T20I	
Aimee Maguire	20	Right-handed	Slow left-arm orthodox	Educational	ODI & T20I	
Kia McCartney	21	Right-handed	Right-arm off break	Casual		
Seam Bowlers
Arlene Kelly	32	Right-handed	Right-arm medium	Full-time	ODI & T20I	
Ava Canning	22	Right-handed	Right-arm medium	Educational	ODI & T20I	
Jane Maguire	23	Right-handed	Right-arm medium	Full-time	ODI & T20I	
Georgina Dempsey	22	Right-handed	Right-arm medium	Educational	ODI & T20I	
Alana Dalzell	25	Right-handed	Right-arm medium	Full-time	ODI & T20I	
Alice Tector	18	Right-handed	Right-arm medium	Casual	ODI & T20I	

Updated as of 11 September 2024.

== Records ==
International match summary – Ireland Women

Last updated 22 November 2026.

Playing record
Format	M	W	L	T	D/NR	Inaugural match
Test matches	1	1	0	0	0	30 July 2000
One-Day Internationals	201	56	137	1	7	28 June 1987
Twenty20 Internationals	163	78	84	0	1	27 June 2008

=== Test matches ===
- Highest team total: 193/3 declared v. Pakistan on 30 July 2000 at Trinity College Park, Dublin.
- Highest individual score: 68*, Caitriona Beggs v. Pakistan on 30 July 2000 at Trinity College Park, Dublin.
- Best innings bowling: 6/21, Isobel Joyce v. Pakistan on 30 July 2000 at Trinity College Park, Dublin.

Test record versus other nations

Records complete to Women's Test #111. Last updated 30 July 2000.

Opponent	M	W	L	T	NR	First match	First win
v. Full Members
Pakistan	1	1	0	0	0	30 July 2000	30 July 2000

=== One-Day Internationals ===
- Highest team total: 337/8 v. Netherlands on 24 August 2022 at VRA Cricket Ground, Amstelveen.
- Highest individual score: 137, Leah Paul v. Netherlands on 24 August 2022 at VRA Cricket Ground, Amstelveen.
- Best innings bowling: 6/31, Cara Murray v. Zimbabwe on 23 January 2024 at Harare Sports Club, Harare.

Most ODI runs for Ireland Women

Player	Runs	Average	Career span
Gaby Lewis	2,083	33.06	2016–2026
Amy Hunter	1,488	34.60	2021–2026
Miriam Grealey	1,412	23.14	1987–2005
Laura Delany	1,411	23.13	2010–2025
Leah Paul	1,375	25.46	2017–2026

Most ODI wickets for Ireland Women

Player	Wickets	Average	Career span
Isobel Joyce	66	30.45	1999–2018
Cara Murray	61	32.08	2018–2026
Ciara Metcalfe	60	27.00	1999–2017
Barbara McDonald	54	26.75	1993–2005
Catherine O'Neill	45	22.84	1993–2003
Arlene Kelly	45	31.51	2022–2026

Highest individual innings in Women's ODI

Player	Score	Opposition	Match Date
Leah Paul	137	Netherlands	24 August 2022
Amy Hunter	121*	Zimbabwe	11 October 2021
Karen Young	120	Pakistan	27 July 2000
Mary-Pat Moore	114*	Denmark	18 July 1995
Laura Delany	109	Netherlands	24 August 2022

Best bowling figures in an innings in Women's ODI

Player	Score	Opposition	Match Date
Cara Murray	6/31	Zimbabwe	23 January 2024
Eimear Richardson	5/13	Netherlands	5 August 2009
Ciara Metcalfe	5/18	Netherlands	17 August 2007
Aimee Maguire	5/19	England	11 September 2024
Susan Bray	5/27	Denmark	18 July 1990

ODI record versus other nations

Records complete to WODI #1564. Last updated 6 September 2026.

Opponent	M	W	L	T	NR	First match	First win
v. Full Members
Australia	17	0	17	0	0	28 June 1987	
Bangladesh	10	1	7	0	2	26 November 2011	21 August 2012
England	23	2	21	0	0	5 December 1988	12 August 2001
India	15	0	15	0	0	26 July 1993	
New Zealand	20	0	18	0	2	29 November 1998	
Pakistan	22	6	16	0	0	18 December 1997	18 December 1997
South Africa	23	1	21	0	1	5 August 1997	11 August 2016
Sri Lanka	7	2	4	0	1	5 December 2000	16 August 2024
West Indies	15	1	13	0	1	29 July 1993	21 July 2001
Zimbabwe	9	7	1	1	0	5 October 2021	7 October 2021
v. Associate Members
Denmark	7	6	1	0	0	19 July 1989	19 July 1989
Japan	1	1	0	0	0	22 July 2003	22 July 2003
Netherlands	25	23	2	0	0	30 November 1988	30 November 1988
Scotland	6	5	1	0	0	11 August 2001	11 August 2001
Thailand	1	1	0	0	0	15 April 2025	15 April 2025

=== Twenty20 Internationals ===
- Highest team total: 223/1, v Germany on 24 August 2025 at Hazelaarweg Stadium, Rotterdam.
- Highest individual innings: 119, Gaby Lewis v Sri Lanka on 13 August 2024 at Sydney Parade, Dublin.
- Best innings bowling: 5/12, Arlene Kelly v Netherlands on 14 August 2023 at VRA Cricket Ground, Amstelveen.

Most WT20I runs for Ireland Women

Player	Runs	Average	Career span
Gaby Lewis	3,185	31.22	2014–2026
Orla Prendergast	2,054	30.20	2019–2026
Laura Delany	1,659	21.26	2010–2026
Amy Hunter	1,645	29.37	2021–2026
Clare Shillington	1,019	18.52	2008–2018

Most WT20I wickets for Ireland Women

Player	Wickets	Average	Career span
Laura Delany	96	18.91	2010–2026
Arlene Kelly	91	15.47	2022–2026
Orla Prendergast	69	19.53	2010–2026
Eimear Richardson	60	21.33	2008–2024
Cara Murray	49	25.91	2023–2026

WT20I record versus other nations

Records complete to WT20I #3091. Last updated 22 November 2026.

Opponent	M	W	L	T	NR	First match	First win
v. Full Members
Australia	8	0	8	0	0	27 March 2014	
Bangladesh	15	6	9	0	0	28 August 2012	5 December 2015
England	5	1	4	0	0	23 June 2012	15 September 2024
India	2	0	2	0	0	15 November 2018	
New Zealand	5	0	5	0	0	18 March 2016	
Pakistan	24	8	16	0	0	25 May 2009	25 May 2009
South Africa	15	2	13	0	0	1 August 2008	3 August 2016
Sri Lanka	7	1	6	0	0	14 October 2010	13 August 2024
West Indies	11	2	9	0	0	27 June 2008	1 June 2026
Zimbabwe	11	11	0	0	0	23 September 2022	23 September 2022
v. Associate Members
France	1	1	0	0	0	29 August 2021	29 August 2021
Germany	3	3	0	0	0	26 August 2021	26 August 2021
Italy	2	2	0	0	0	23 August 2025	23 August 2025
Namibia	2	2	0	0	0	31 August 2019	31 August 2019
Netherlands	19	17	1	0	1	6 August 2009	6 August 2009
Papua New Guinea	4	4	0	0	0	12 July 2018	12 July 2018
Scotland	17	9	8	0	0	8 July 2018	8 July 2018
Thailand	6	3	3	0	0	7 July 2018	7 July 2018
Uganda	1	1	0	0	0	10 July 2018	10 July 2018
United Arab Emirates	2	2	0	0	0	25 April 2024	25 April 2024
United States	2	2	0	0	0	19 September 2022	19 September 2022
Vanuatu	1	1	0	0	0	1 May 2024	1 May 2024

== See also ==
- Irish men's cricket team
- List of Ireland women Test cricketers
- List of Ireland women ODI cricketers
- List of Ireland women Twenty20 International cricketers
