= Scorchers (women's cricket) =

Irish women's cricket team

Personnel
- Captain: Gaby Lewis
- Coach: Claire Terblanche

Team information
- Colours: Orange
- Founded: 2015

History
- WSS wins: 7

Scorchers are an Irish women's cricket team that compete in the Women's Super Series. The team has no geographical base, instead being made up of some of the best players from across Ireland. They are captained by Gaby Lewis and coached by Claire Terblanche. They have won seven Super Series tournaments.

== History ==
Scorchers were established in 2015 to compete in the Women's Super 3s, a tournament designed to bridge the gap between club cricket and international cricket in Ireland. The team was made up of some of the best players in Irish cricket, and were captained by Kim Garth and coached by Chris Siddell. Scorchers won the first edition of the tournament, winning five of their eight matches, with captain Kim Garth winning the Player of the Tournament award. In 2016, Scorchers finished second in the group with two victories in their six games, with strong performances from Lucy O'Reilly and Una Raymond-Hoey, who was selected for the national side off the back of her runs for the side.

2017 brought Scorchers' second title, as they topped the group with seven wins from their ten matches. The following season, 2018, however, Scorchers performed poorly, finishing bottom of the league with three wins. In 2019, Scorchers again won three matches, including both T20s on the final day of competition, this time finishing second in the league.

In 2020 the tournament was reduced to two teams due to the COVID-19 pandemic, with Scorchers now facing off against Typhoons in eight 50 over matches. The two sides each won 4 matches, with Typhoons just edging out Scorchers for the title on Net Run Rate. Scorchers batters Leah Paul and Gaby Lewis led the run-scoring charts in 2020. The 2021 tournament again included just two sides, with Scorchers and Typhoons now playing for separate 50 over and T20 titles. In June, Scorchers won the 50 over section of the tournament, winning four of the seven matches, and in August won the T20 section of the tournament, again with four victories. In 2022, with the tournament expanded back to three teams, Scorchers again won both the 50 over and T20 titles. In 2023, they won the Super 20 Trophy, but finished bottom of the Super 50 Cup.

== Players ==
=== Current squad ===
Based on squad announced for the 2023 season. Players in bold have international caps.

No.	Name	Nationality	Birth date	Batting style	Bowling style	Notes
Batters
13	**Mary-Anne Musonda**	Zimbabwe	4 August 1991 (age 34)	Right-handed	Right-arm off break	Overseas player
–	Genevieve Morrissey	Ireland	Unknown	Unknown	Unknown	
All-rounders
1	**Aimee Maguire**	Ireland	9 September 2006 (age 19)	Right-handed	Slow left-arm orthodox	
2	Annabel Squires	Ireland	Unknown	Right-handed	Unknown	
8	Julie McNally	Ireland	18 July 2007 (age 18)	Right-handed	Right-arm medium	
11	Ellie McGee	Ireland	2 August 2006 (age 19)	Right-handed	Right-arm medium	
12	**Lara Maritz**	Ireland	7 January 2001 (age 24)	Right-handed	Right-arm medium	
20	**Sophie MacMahon**	Ireland	29 January 1997 (age 28)	Right-handed	Right-arm medium	
66	**Gaby Lewis**	Ireland	27 March 2001 (age 24)	Right-handed	Right-arm leg break	Captain
–	Síbha Bhoja	Ireland	Unknown	Right-handed	Right-arm medium	
Wicket-keepers
6	Isabelle McLean	Ireland	Unknown	Unknown	Unknown	
11	Polly Inglis	New Zealand	31 May 1996 (age 29)	Right-handed	—	Overseas player
15	Siúin Woods	Ireland	11 January 2004 (age 21)	Right-handed	–	
85	**Shauna Kavanagh**	Ireland	21 April 1992 (age 33)	Right-handed	Right-arm medium	
Bowlers
3	Christina Coulter Reilly	Ireland	Unknown	Right-handed	Right-arm leg break	
4	Jenny Sparrow	Ireland	Unknown	Right-handed	Right-arm medium	
14	Niamh MacNulty	Ireland	6 November 2006 (age 18)	Right-handed	Right-arm medium	
28	**Jane Maguire**	Ireland	18 February 2003 (age 22)	Right-handed	Right-arm medium	
74	**Hannah Little**	Ireland	21 July 2001 (age 24)	Right-handed	Right-arm medium	
98	**Anna Kerrison**	Ireland	10 September 1998 (age 27)	Right-handed	Right-arm off break	

== Seasons ==
=== Women's Super Series ===
==== Combined format ====
Season	League standings								Notes
Season	P	W	L	T	A/C	NRR	Pts	Pos	Notes
2015	8	5	2	1	0	+0.972	11	1st	Champions
2016	6	2	2	0	2	+0.057	6	2nd	
2017	10	7	1	0	2	+0.981	16	1st	Champions
2018	10	3	5	0	2	–0.144	8	3rd	
2019	10	3	4	0	3	–0.078	9	2nd	
2020	8	4	4	0	0	–0.189	8	2nd	

==== Super 50 Cup ====
Season	League standings								Notes
Season	P	W	L	T	A/C	NRR	Pts	Pos	Notes
2021	7	4	1	0	2	+1.062	10	1st	Champions
2022	6	5	0	0	1	+2.410	11	1st	Champions
2023	6	0	3	0	3	–2.910	6	3rd	

==== Super 20 Trophy ====
Season	League standings								Notes
Season	P	W	L	T	A/C	NRR	Pts	Pos	Notes
2021	6	4	1	0	1	+0.560	9	1st	Champions
2022	6	3	1	0	2	+0.500	8	1st	Champions
2023	6	4	2	0	0	+0.390	18	1st	Champions

== Honours ==
- Women's Super Series (combined format):
  - Winners (2): 2015, 2017
- Super 50 Cup:
  - Winners (2): 2021 & 2022
- Super 20 Trophy:
  - Winners (3): 2021, 2022 & 2023
