= Orla Prendergast =

Irish cricketer (born 2002)

Personal information
- Full name: Orla Patricia Prendergast
- Born: 1 June 2002 (age 24)
- Batting: Right-handed
- Bowling: Right-arm medium
- Role: All-rounder

International information
- National side: Ireland (2019–present)
- ODI debut (cap 90): 5 October 2021 v Zimbabwe
- Last ODI: 15 July 2026 v West Indies
- ODI shirt no.: 10 (previously 84)
- T20I debut (cap 44): 29 June 2019 v Netherlands
- Last T20I: 27 June 2026 v West Indies
- T20I shirt no.: 10 (previously 84)

Domestic team information
- Years: Team
- 2016–2018: Scorchers
- 2019–2021: Typhoons
- 2022–present: Dragons
- 2023: Western Storm
- 2023: Trinbago Knight Riders
- 2024-present: The Blaze
- 2024/25: Adelaide Strikers
- 2026: Welsh Fire
- 2026/27-: Brisbane Heat

Career statistics
Competition	WODI	WT20I
Matches	47	88
Runs scored	1262	2054
Batting average	32.35	30.20
100s/50s	1/6	0/14
Top score	122*	80
Balls bowled	1252	1404
Wickets	29	69
Bowling average	35.51	19.53
5 wickets in innings	0	0
10 wickets in match	0	0
Best bowling	3/25	4/22
Catches/stumpings	23/–	38/–
- Source: Cricinfo, 16 August 2026

Orla Patricia Prendergast (born 1 June 2002) is an Irish cricketer who plays for Dragons and Ireland. In August 2019, she was named in the Irish Women's Twenty20 International (WT20I) squad for the 2019 Netherlands Women's Quadrangular Series. She made her WT20I debut for Ireland, against the Netherlands, on 8 August 2019.

In August 2019, she was named in Ireland's squad for the 2019 ICC Women's World Twenty20 Qualifier tournament in Scotland.

She also played for the Republic of Ireland women's national under-17 football team in 2018 and 2019, and at club level for Cabinteely F.C. She attended The High School, Dublin. In July 2020, she was awarded a non-retainer contract by Cricket Ireland for the following year.

In September 2021, Prendergast was named in Ireland's Women's One Day International (WODI) squad for their series against Zimbabwe, the first WODI matches to be played by the Zimbabwe team. She made her WODI debut on 5 October 2021, for Ireland against Zimbabwe.

In November 2021, she was named in Ireland's team for the 2021 Women's Cricket World Cup Qualifier tournament in Zimbabwe. In April 2023, it was announced that Prendergast had signed for Western Storm, to play for the side in May and June that year. She scored 115 on debut for the side, against North West Thunder in the Rachael Heyhoe Flint Trophy. She played ten matches overall for the side, including scoring 117 runs and taking six wickets in the Charlotte Edwards Cup.

In August 2023 she signed for Trinbago Knight Riders in the Women's Caribbean Premier League.

On 16 August 2024, Prendergast signed for English regional club The Blaze for the remainder of the season. That same day she made her first WODI century, scoring 122 not out from 107 balls, including 10 4s and two 6s, against Sri Lanka at Stormont in Belfast.

In September Prendergast was drafted in the final round by the Adelaide Strikers for the 2024–25 Women's Big Bash League.

She was named in the Ireland squad for their T20I and ODI tour to Bangladesh in November 2024.

Prendergast was among the four player shortlist for the 2024 ICC Women's T20I Cricketer of the Year.

Prendergast was part of the Ireland squad for the 2025 Women's Cricket World Cup Qualifier in Pakistan in April 2025.
