= Gaby Lewis =

Irish cricketer (born 2001)

Personal information
- Full name: Gaby Hollis Lewis
- Born: 27 March 2001 (age 25); Dublin, Ireland
- Batting: Right-handed
- Bowling: Right-arm leg break
- Role: All-rounder
- Relatives: Alan Lewis (father); Ian Lewis (grandfather); Robyn Lewis (sister)

International information
- National side: Ireland (2014–present)
- ODI debut (cap 76): 5 August 2016 v South Africa
- Last ODI: 15 July 2026 v West Indies
- T20I debut (cap 32): 9 September 2014 v South Africa
- Last T20I: 27 June 2026 v West Indies

Domestic team information
- Years: Team
- 2015–2018: Dragons
- 2019–present: Scorchers
- 2021: Southern Brave
- 2021: Southern Vipers
- 2022: Northern Superchargers
- 2023: Barbados Royals
- 2025: Lancashire

Career statistics
Competition	WODI	WT20I	WLA	WT20
Matches	65	119	131	186
Runs scored	1,979	3,185	4705	4725
Batting average	32.98	31.22	40.91	30.28
100s/50s	0/16	2/20	8/29	3/28
Top score	96*	119	198	119
Balls bowled	659	90	1,215	318
Wickets	10	3	19	8
Bowling average	71.50	40.00	61.94	43.50
5 wickets in innings	0	0	0	0
10 wickets in match	0	0	0	0
Best bowling	2/41	2/20	2/21	2/14
Catches/stumpings	19/–	49/–	42/–	74/–
- Source: CricketArchive, 16 August 2024

Gaby Hollis Lewis (born 27 March 2001) is an Irish international cricketer and captain of the Ireland women's team.

She made her senior international debut in July 2014, aged only 13, and made her Twenty20 International (T20I) debut later in the same year, becoming the youngest to play at that level. The International Cricket Council (ICC) named Lewis as one of the five breakout stars in women's cricket in 2018.

She currently captains the Women's Super Series team Scorchers. In June 2022, at the age of 21, Lewis became the youngest player to captain the Ireland Women's team in international cricket.

== Early life ==
Lewis was born in Dublin. Her older sister, Robyn Lewis, has played alongside her both at club and national level, while her father, Alan Lewis, and grandfather, Ian Lewis, both represented the Irish men's side. Both members of Dublin's YMCA Cricket Club, the Lewis sisters first came to attention in November 2013, when they were named in Cricket Ireland's Emerging Players Squad. Gaby Lewis was first called up to Ireland's senior team in July 2014, playing five matches against English county sides in the ECB Women's Twenty20 Cup. She subsequently made her international debut in August, playing twice against the Netherlands at the 2014 European Championship. In the second of those matches, she scored 38 from 35 balls coming in third in the batting order, which included a 94-run partnership with Clare Shillington (20 years her elder).

== Domestic career ==
Lewis has played in the Women's Super Series for Dragons and Scorchers, and began captaining Scorchers ahead of the 2020 season. On 12 August 2021, Lewis was signed as a replacement player for Southern Brave in The Hundred, after Smriti Mandhana returned home. She played two matches for the side, scoring just 9 runs. She was also signed by Southern Vipers for the remainder of their 2021 Rachael Heyhoe Flint Trophy campaign. She played four matches, scoring 97 runs at an average of 24.25, as the side won the competition. In 2022, she was signed by Northern Superchargers in The Hundred as a replacement for the injured Jemimah Rodrigues.

On 3 September 2025, Lewis signed a short-term contract with Lancashire. She went on to score 272 runs across five innings for the club including 141 not out as they beat Hampshire in the final of the Women's One-Day Cup on 21 September 2025.

== International career ==
In September 2014, Lewis was selected in Ireland's squad for a three-match T20I series against South Africa, played at a neutral venue in Birmingham, England. She sat the first game out, but was included for the final two games, scoring five runs on debut and then 12 not out in the third game. On debut, Lewis was 13 years and 166 days old, breaking the record set by her teammate Lucy O'Reilly for the youngest T20I player. She also became the first international cricketer born in the 21st century. Across all men's and women's international cricket (Tests, ODIs, and T20Is), only Pakistan's Sajjida Shah has played at a younger age.

After her debut series against South Africa, Lewis next played at international level in August 2015, when she was named in Ireland's squad for a three-match series against Australia. In the first match, she came in sixth in the batting order, and scored 23 runs from 30 balls, behind only Cecelia Joyce. She had less success, however, in the other matches, scoring four runs in the second game and ten in the third. Later in the year, Lewis also played in the 2015 World Twenty20 Qualifier in Thailand. At the 2016 World Twenty20 in India, she played in two of her team's matches (against New Zealand and Sri Lanka), but had little impact.

In June 2018, she was named in Ireland's squad for the 2018 ICC Women's World Twenty20 Qualifier tournament. The following month she was named in the ICC Women's Global Development Squad. In October 2018, she was named in Ireland's squad for the 2018 ICC Women's World Twenty20 tournament in the West Indies.

In August 2019, she was the leading run-scorer in the 2019 Netherlands Women's Quadrangular Series, with 180 runs from six matches. The following month, she was named in Ireland's squad for the 2019 ICC Women's World Twenty20 Qualifier tournament in Scotland. In July 2020, she was awarded a part-time professional contract by Cricket Ireland for the following year.

In August 2021, Lewis was named in Ireland's squad for the 2021 ICC Women's T20 World Cup Europe Qualifier in Spain. In Ireland's opening match of the tournament, against Germany, Lewis scored 105 not out to become the first cricketer for Ireland to score a century in a WT20I match. In November 2021, she was named in Ireland's team for the 2021 Women's Cricket World Cup Qualifier tournament in Zimbabwe.

In May 2022, Lewis was named as the captain of Ireland's team for their home series against South Africa. In the first match of the tour, Lewis scored her 1,000th run in WT20I cricket. In the next match, Lewis earned her 50th cap in the format. On 26 August 2022, Lewis earned her 100th international cap for Ireland, scoring 92 in her side's victory against the Netherlands.

In August 2024 Lewis made her highest score in international cricket with 119(75) to guide Ireland to a win over Sri Lanka and draw their T20I series. A month later she made 72(56) as stand-in captain to lead Ireland to their first ODI win over England since 2001.

Lewis was named full-time Ireland captain in October 2024, replacing teammate Laura Delany in the role. Head coach Ed Joyce commented saying that "Gaby, as a cricketer and leader, has continued to grow and improve year-on-year. Her analysis and reading of the game are excellent and her captaincy in Laura’s absence for much of this summer was outstanding. She is ready to take on the role of captain and I’m excited to see where she can take the team in the next few years."

She was named as captain of the Ireland squad for their T20I and ODI tour to Bangladesh in November 2024. She made her 50th appearance in the ODI format during the India tour in January 2025.

Lewis captained the Ireland squad for the 2025 Women's Cricket World Cup Qualifier in Pakistan in April 2025.
