= Louise Little (cricketer) =

Irish cricketer (born 2003)

Personal information
- Born: 16 May 2003 (age 23); Dublin, Ireland
- Batting: Right-handed
- Bowling: Right-arm medium
- Role: All-rounder
- Relatives: Hannah Little (sister); Josh Little (brother)

International information
- National side: Ireland (2017–present)
- ODI debut (cap 84): 11 May 2017 v South Africa
- Last ODI: 01 September 2026 v England
- T20I debut (cap 39): 26 May 2019 v West Indies
- Last T20I: 27 June 2026 v West Indies

Domestic team information
- Years: Team
- 2016–present: Typhoons

Career statistics
Competition	WODI	WT20I
Matches	15	42
Runs scored	87	178
Batting average	5.8	12.71
100s/50s	0/0	0/0
Top score	27	26*
Balls bowled	572	180
Wickets	9	2
Bowling average	63.55	129.00
5 wickets in innings	1	0
10 wickets in match	0	0
Best bowling	5/28	2/8
Catches/stumpings	4/–	11/–
- Source: Cricinfo, 16 August 2026

Louise Little (born 16 May 2003) is an Irish cricketer who plays for Typhoons and Ireland. She made her Women's One Day International cricket (WODI) debut against South Africa in the 2017 South Africa Quadrangular Series on 11 May 2017.

In May 2019, she was named in Ireland's Women's Twenty20 International (WT20I) squad for their series against the West Indies. She made her WT20I debut for Ireland against the West Indies on 26 May 2019.

In August 2019, she was named in Ireland's squad for the 2019 ICC Women's World Twenty20 Qualifier tournament in Scotland. In July 2020, she was awarded a non-retainer contract by Cricket Ireland for the following year. In November 2021, she was named in Ireland's team for the 2021 Women's Cricket World Cup Qualifier tournament in Zimbabwe.

Little was part of the Ireland squad for the 2025 Women's Cricket World Cup Qualifier in Pakistan in April 2025.
