= Ireland women's cricket team in Bangladesh in 2024–25 =

International cricket tour

	Bangladesh	Ireland
- Dates: 27 November – 9 December 2024
Captains	Nigar Sultana	Gaby Lewis

One Day International series
- Results: Bangladesh won the 3-match series 3–0
Most runs	Sharmin Akhter (211)	Amy Hunter (91)
Most wickets	Sultana Khatun (7)	Laura Delany (3); Aimee Maguire (3)
- Player of the series: Fargana Hoque (Ban)

Twenty20 International series
- Results: Ireland won the 3-match series 3–0
Most runs	Sharmin Akhter (95)	Gaby Lewis (95); Leah Paul (95)
Most wickets	Nahida Akter (4)	Orla Prendergast (10)
- Player of the series: Orla Prendergast (Ire)

The Ireland women's cricket team toured Bangladesh in November and December 2024 to play three One Day International (ODI) and three Twenty20 International (T20I) matches against the Bangladesh women's cricket team. The ODI series formed part of the 2022–2025 ICC Women's Championship. It was the Ireland women's side's first tour to Bangladesh as a bilateral series. Last time they toured Bangladesh in 2014 for the ICC Women's T20 World Cup. In November 2024, Bangladesh Cricket Board (BCB) confirmed the full tour itinerary.

Bangladesh won the ODI series 3–0. Ireland swept the T20I series 3–0.

== Squads ==
Bangladesh		Ireland	
ODIs	T20Is	ODIs	T20Is
Nigar Sultana (c, wk); Nahida Akter (vc); Marufa Akter; Sharmin Akhter; Shorna Akter; Jahanara Alam; Fargana Hoque; Rabeya Khan; Fahima Khatun; Murshida Khatun; Sultana Khatun; Ritu Moni; Sobhana Mostary; Sanjida Akter Meghla; Taj Nehar	Nigar Sultana (c, wk); Nahida Akter (vc); Sharmin Akhter; Dilara Akter; Shorna Akter; Jahanara Alam; Jannatul Ferdus; Rabeya Khan; Fahima Khatun; Murshida Khatun; Sanjida Akter Meghla; Ritu Moni; Sobhana Mostary; Taj Nehar; Fariha Trisna	Gaby Lewis (c); Ava Canning; Christina Coulter Reilly (wk); Alana Dalzell; Laura Delany; Sarah Forbes; Amy Hunter (wk); Arlene Kelly; Aimee Maguire; ~~Jane Maguire~~; Cara Murray; Leah Paul; Orla Prendergast; Una Raymond-Hoey; Freya Sargent; Alice Tector	Gaby Lewis (c); Ava Canning; Christina Coulter Reilly (wk); Alana Dalzell; Laura Delany; Sarah Forbes; Amy Hunter (wk); Arlene Kelly; Aimee Maguire; ~~Jane Maguire~~; Cara Murray; Leah Paul; Orla Prendergast; Una Raymond-Hoey; Freya Sargent; Rebecca Stokell

Bangladesh named Dilara Akter, Disha Biswas, Jannatul Ferdus, Sharmin Sultana and Fariha Trisna as reserve players for the ODI squad. Uncapped players Taj Nehar and Sanjida Akter Meghla were named in the ODI squad.

On 21 November, Jane Maguire was ruled out of the ODI and T20I squad due to injury, and Alana Dalzell was named as her replacement.

== ODI series ==
=== 1st ODI ===
27 November 2024
10:00
Scorecard

Bangladesh; 252/4 (50 overs)	v	Ireland; 98 (28.5 overs)
Sharmin Akhter 96 (89); Freya Sargent 2/51 (10 overs)		Sarah Forbes 25 (51); Sultana Khatun 3/23 (8.5 overs)

Bangladesh won by 154 runs
Sher-e-Bangla National Cricket Stadium, Dhaka
Umpires: Shathira Jakir (Ban) and Sue Redfern (Eng)
Player of the match: Sharmin Akhter (Ban)

- Bangladesh won the toss and elected to bat.
- Women's Championship points: Bangladesh 2, Ireland 0.

=== 2nd ODI ===
30 November 2024
10:00
Scorecard

Ireland; 193/6 (50 overs)	v	Bangladesh; 197/5 (43.5 overs)
Amy Hunter 68 (88); Sultana Khatun 2/32 (10 overs)		Fargana Hoque 50 (89); Laura Delany 2/43 (6.5 overs)

Bangladesh won by 5 wickets
Sher-e-Bangla National Cricket Stadium, Dhaka
Umpires: Muhammad Kamruzzaman (Ban) and Sue Redfern (Eng)
Player of the match: Nigar Sultana (Ban)

- Ireland won the toss and elected to bat.
- Women's Championship points: Bangladesh 2, Ireland 0.

=== 3rd ODI ===
2 December 2024
10:00
Scorecard

Ireland; 185 (50 overs)	v	Bangladesh; 186/3 (37.3 overs)
Gaby Lewis 52 (79); Fahima Khatun 3/43 (10 overs)		Sharmin Akhter 72 (88); Aimee Maguire 2/38 (8 overs)

Bangladesh won by 7 wickets
Sher-e-Bangla National Cricket Stadium, Dhaka
Umpires: Shathira Jakir (Ban) and Sue Redfern (Eng)
Player of the match: Sharmin Akhter (Ban)

- Ireland won the toss and elected to bat.
- Ritu Moni replaced Marufa Akter as a concussion substitute for Bangladesh during first innings.
- Women's Championship points: Bangladesh 2, Ireland 0.

== T20I series ==
=== 1st T20I ===
5 December 2024
14:00
Scorecard

Ireland; 169/5 (20 overs)	v	Bangladesh; 157/7 (20 overs)
Leah Paul 79* (45); Fariha Trisna 1/32 (4 overs)		Dilara Akter 49 (41); Arlene Kelly 3/22 (4 overs)

Ireland won by 12 runs
Sylhet International Cricket Stadium, Sylhet
Umpires: Mishu Chowdhury (Ban) and Sue Redfern (Eng)
Player of the match: Leah Paul (Ire)

- Ireland won the toss and elected to bat.

=== 2nd T20I ===
7 December 2024
14:00
Scorecard

Ireland; 134/5 (20 overs)	v	Bangladesh; 87 (17.1 overs)
Laura Delany 35 (25); Nahida Akter 2/20 (4 overs)		Sharmin Akhter 38 (43); Orla Prendergast 3/13 (3.1 overs)

Ireland won by 47 runs
Sylhet International Cricket Stadium, Sylhet
Umpires: Dolly Rani (Ban) and Sue Redfern (Eng)
Player of the match: Orla Prendergast (Ire)

- Ireland won the toss and elected to bat.

=== 3rd T20I ===
9 December 2024
10:00
Scorecard

Bangladesh; 123/7 (20 overs)	v	Ireland; 124/6 (19.5 overs)
Sobhana Mostary 45 (43); Orla Prendergast 4/22 (4 overs)		Laura Delany 36* (31); Rabeya Khan 2/17 (4 overs)

Ireland won by 4 wickets
Sylhet International Cricket Stadium, Sylhet
Umpires: Shathira Jakir (Ban) and Sue Redfern (Eng)
Player of the match: Laura Delany (Ire)

- Ireland won the toss and elected to field.
