= Sri Lanka women's cricket team in Ireland in 2024 =

International cricket tour

| | Ireland | Sri Lanka |
- Dates: 11 – 20 August 2024
| Captains | Gaby Lewis (ODIs) (Note: Orla Prendergast captained Ireland in the last two ODIs.); Laura Delany (T20Is) | Chamari Athapaththu (ODIs); Anushka Sanjeewani (T20Is) |

One Day International series
- Results: Ireland won the 3-match series 2–1
| Most runs | Orla Prendergast (134) | Harshitha Samarawickrama (172) |
| Most wickets | Arlene Kelly (5) | Kavisha Dilhari (6); Achini Kulasuriya (6) |
- Player of the series: Arlene Kelly (Ire)

Twenty20 International series
- Results: 2-match series drawn 1–1
| Most runs | Gaby Lewis (158) | Harshitha Samarawickrama (151) |
| Most wickets | Freya Sargent (3) | Inoshi Priyadharshani (2) |
- Player of the series: Gaby Lewis (Ire)

The Sri Lanka women's cricket team toured Ireland in August 2024 to play the Ireland women's cricket team. The tour consists of two Twenty20 International (T20I) and three One Day International (ODI) matches. The ODI series formed part of the 2022–2025 ICC Women's Championship. This was Sri Lanka's first bilateral tour of Ireland. In April 2024, the Cricket Ireland (CI) announced the fixtures for the tour, as a part of the 2024 home international season.

The tourists won the first T20I comfortably by 7 wickets, with Harshitha Samarawickrama scoring an unbeaten 86. However, Ireland won the second match by 7 runs, their first victory over Sri Lanka, with Gaby Lewis scoring a magnificent century of 119, to ensure that the series finished level.

Vishmi Gunaratne's maiden century went in vain as the hosts won the first ODI by three wickets, their first victory over Sri Lanka, with Orla Prendergast scoring an unbeaten 122. Despite a maiden century by Harshitha Samarawickrama, Ireland won the second ODI by 15 runs, with Leah Paul playing a magnificent innings of 81 and secured their first series victory over Sri Lanka. Sri Lanka won the third and last ODI by eight wickets to prevent a whitewash, with the help of an all-round performance from Chamari Athapaththu.

== Squads ==
| Ireland | | Sri Lanka | |
| ODIs | T20Is | ODIs | T20Is |
|---|---|---|---|
| Gaby Lewis (c); Orla Prendergast (vc); ~~Laura Delany (c)~~; Ava Canning; Christina Coulter-Reilly (wk); Alana Dalzell; Sarah Forbes; Amy Hunter (wk); Arlene Kelly; Joanna Loughran (wk); Aimee Maguire; Jane Maguire; Leah Paul; ~~Una Raymond-Hoey~~; Freya Sargent; Rebecca Stokell; Alice Tector | Laura Delany (c); Ava Canning; Christina Coulter-Reilly (wk); Alana Dalzell; Sarah Forbes; Amy Hunter (wk); Arlene Kelly; Gaby Lewis; Jane Maguire; Cara Murray; Leah Paul; Orla Prendergast; Una Raymond-Hoey; Freya Sargent; Rebecca Stokell | Chamari Athapaththu (c); Nilakshi de Silva; Kavisha Dilhari; Shashini Gimhani; Vishmi Gunaratne; Ama Kanchana; Kawya Kavindi; Achini Kulasuriya; Sugandika Kumari; Sachini Nisansala; Kaushini Nuthyangana (wk); Hasini Perera; Udeshika Prabodhani; Inoshi Priyadharshani; Harshitha Samarawickrama; Anushka Sanjeewani (wk) | Anushka Sanjeewani (c, wk); Nilakshi de Silva; Kavisha Dilhari; Shashini Gimhani; Vishmi Gunaratne; Ama Kanchana; Kawya Kavindi; Achini Kulasuriya; Sugandika Kumari; Sachini Nisansala; Kaushini Nuthyangana (wk); Hasini Perera; Udeshika Prabodhani; Inoshi Priyadharshani; Harshitha Samarawickrama |

On 12 August 2024, Una Raymond-Hoey was ruled out of the T20I series due to injury, Sarah Forbes was named as her replacement. On 15 August 2024, Ireland captain Laura Delany and Una Raymond-Hoey were ruled out of the ODI series due to ligament damage and muscle tear respectively. Gaby Lewis was named as the captain and Orla Prendergast was named as her deputy. Jane Maguire was named as replacement for Laura Delany, while Sarah Forbes remained with the squad as cover. Lewis sustained an injury while fielding in the first ODI, ruling her out of the remainder of the series, with Prendergast taking over as captain. Christina Coulter-Reilly joined the Ireland squad as cover.

== T20I series ==
=== 1st T20I ===
11 August 2024
16:00
Scorecard

| Ireland; 145/6 (20 overs) | v | Sri Lanka; 149/3 (16.4 overs) |
| Gaby Lewis 39 (33); Inoshi Priyadharshani 2/35 (4 overs) | | Harshitha Samarawickrama 86* (45); Laura Delany 1/16 (2 overs) |

Sri Lanka won by 7 wickets
Sydney Parade, Dublin
Umpires: Sue Redfern (Eng) and Aidan Seaver (Ire)
Player of the match: Harshitha Samarawickrama (SL)

- Sri Lanka won the toss and elected to field.

=== 2nd T20I ===
13 August 2024
16:00
Scorecard

| Ireland; 173/3 (20 overs) | v | Sri Lanka; 166/7 (20 overs) |
| Gaby Lewis 119 (75); Shashini Gimhani 1/24 (3 overs) | | Harshitha Samarawickrama 65 (44); Orla Prendergast 2/28 (4 overs) |

Ireland won by 7 runs
Sydney Parade, Dublin
Umpires: Mark Hawthorne (Ire) and Sue Redfern (Eng)
Player of the match: Gaby Lewis (Ire)

- Ireland won the toss and elected to bat.
- Christina Coulter-Reilly (Ire) made her T20I debut.
- Gaby Lewis achieved the highest score for an Ireland player in women's T20Is.
- This was Ireland's first win against Sri Lanka in women's T20Is.

== ODI series ==
=== 1st ODI ===
16 August 2024
10:45
Scorecard

| Sri Lanka; 260/8 (50 overs) | v | Ireland; 261/7 (49.2 overs) |
| Vishmi Gunaratne 101 (98); Orla Prendergast 3/25 (8 overs) | | Orla Prendergast 122* (107); Kavisha Dilhari 4/54 (10 overs) |

Ireland won by 3 wickets
Stormont, Belfast
Umpires: Sue Redfern (Eng) and Aidan Seaver (Ire)
Player of the match: Orla Prendergast (Ire)

- Ireland won the toss and elected to field.
- Alice Tector (Ire) made her ODI debut.
- Vishmi Gunaratne (SL) and Orla Prendergast (Ire) both scored their first century in ODIs.
- This was Ireland's first win against Sri Lanka in women's ODIs.
- Women's Championship points: Ireland 2, Sri Lanka 0.

=== 2nd ODI ===
18 August 2024
10:45
Scorecard

| Ireland; 255/5 (50 overs) | v | Sri Lanka; 240 (48 overs) |
| Leah Paul 81 (101); Kavisha Dilhari 2/35 (9 overs) | | Harshitha Samarawickrama 105 (124); Arlene Kelly 3/41 (8 overs) |

Ireland won by 15 runs
Stormont, Belfast
Umpires: Mark Hawthorne (Ire) and Sue Redfern (Eng)
Player of the match: Leah Paul (Ire)

- Sri Lanka won the toss and elected to field.
- Orla Prendergast captained Ireland for the first time in women's ODIs.
- Christina Coulter-Reilly (Ire) made her ODI debut.
- Harshitha Samarawickrama (SL) scored her first century in ODIs.
- Women's Championship points: Ireland 2, Sri Lanka 0.

=== 3rd ODI ===
20 August 2024
10:45
Scorecard

| Ireland; 122 (46.3 overs) | v | Sri Lanka; 123/2 (23.1 overs) |
| Arlene Kelly 35 (75); Chamari Athapaththu 3/15 (8.3 overs) | | Chamari Athapaththu 48 (49); Ava Canning 1/14 (3 overs) |

Sri Lanka won by 8 wickets
Stormont, Belfast
Umpires: Sue Redfern (Eng) and Aidan Seaver (Ire)
Player of the match: Chamari Athapaththu (SL)

- Sri Lanka won the toss and elected to field.
- Women's Championship points: Sri Lanka 2, Ireland 0.
