= Bangladesh women's cricket team in the West Indies in 2024–25 =

International cricket tour

	West Indies	Bangladesh
- Dates: 19 – 31 January 2025
Captains	Hayley Matthews (Note: Karishma Ramharack captained West Indies in the third T20I.)	Nigar Sultana

One Day International series
- Results: West Indies won the 3-match series 2–1
Most runs	Hayley Matthews (142)	Nigar Sultana (93)
Most wickets	Karishma Ramharack (8)	Nahida Akter (4)
- Player of the series: Karishma Ramharack (WI)

Twenty20 International series
- Results: West Indies won the 3-match series 3–0
Most runs	Deandra Dottin (110)	Nigar Sultana (96)
Most wickets	Afy Fletcher (4)	Fahima Khatun (7)
- Player of the series: Deandra Dottin (WI)

The Bangladesh women's cricket team toured the West Indies in January 2025 to play three One Day International (ODI) and three Twenty20 International (T20I) matches against the West Indies national team. The ODI series formed part of the 2022–2025 ICC Women's Championship. It was the Bangladesh women's first tour of the West Indies and the first ever bilateral series between the two sides. In January 2025, the Cricket West Indies (CWI) confirmed the fixtures for the tour. All the matches were played at the Warner Park in Basseterre, St. Kitts.

== Squads ==
West Indies	Bangladesh
Hayley Matthews (c); Shemaine Campbelle (vc, wk); Aaliyah Alleyne; Nerissa Crafton; Deandra Dottin; Afy Fletcher; Cherry-Ann Fraser; Shabika Gajnabi; Jannillea Glasgow; Chinelle Henry; Zaida James; Qiana Joseph; Mandy Mangru; Ashmini Munisar; Karishma Ramharack	Nigar Sultana (c, wk); Nahida Akter (vc); Dilara Akter (wk); Sharmin Akhter; Marufa Akter; Shorna Akter; Fargana Hoque; Rabeya Khan; Fahima Khatun; Murshida Khatun; Sultana Khatun; Sanjida Akter Meghla; Lata Mondal; Sobhana Mostary; Taj Nehar; Fariha Trisna

== ODI series ==
=== 1st ODI ===
19 January 2025
14:00 (D/N)
Scorecard

Bangladesh; 198/9 (50 overs)	v	West Indies; 202/1 (31.4 overs)
Sharmin Akhter 42 (70); Deandra Dottin 3/40 (10 overs)		Hayley Matthews 104* (93); Rabeya Khan 1/38 (7.4 overs)

West Indies won by 9 wickets
Warner Park Sporting Complex, Basseterre
Umpires: Lauren Agenbag (SA) and Jacqueline Williams (WI)
Player of the match: Hayley Matthews (WI)

- West Indies won the toss and elected to field.
- Jannillea Glasgow (WI) and Sanjida Akter Meghla (Ban) both made their ODI debuts.
- Women's Championship points: West Indies 2, Bangladesh 0.

=== 2nd ODI ===
21 January 2025
14:00 (D/N)
Scorecard

Bangladesh; 184 (48.5 overs)	v	West Indies; 124 (35 overs)
Nigar Sultana 68 (120); Karishma Ramharack 4/33 (10 overs)		Shemaine Campbelle 28 (43); Nahida Akter 3/31 (10 overs)

Bangladesh won by 60 runs
Warner Park, Basseterre
Umpires: Lauren Agenbag (SA) and Jacqueline Williams (WI)
Player of the match: Nahida Akter (Ban)

- West Indies won the toss and elected to field.
- This was Bangladesh's first win against West Indies in women's ODIs.
- Women's Championship points: Bangladesh 2, West Indies 0.

=== 3rd ODI ===
24 January 2025
14:00 (D/N)
Scorecard

Bangladesh; 118 (43.5 overs)	v	West Indies; 122/2 (27.3 overs)
Sharmin Akhter 37 (58); Karishma Ramharack 4/12 (6.5 overs)		Qiana Joseph 39 (66); Nahida Akter 1/25 (6 overs)

West Indies won by 8 wickets
Warner Park, Basseterre
Umpires: Lauren Agenbag (SA) and Jacqueline Williams (WI)
Player of the match: Karishma Ramharack (WI)

- Bangladesh won the toss and elected to bat.
- Women's Championship points: West Indies 2, Bangladesh 0.

== T20I series ==
=== 1st T20I ===
27 January 2025
18:00 (N)
Scorecard

Bangladesh; 144/3 (20 overs)	v	West Indies; 145/2 (16.5 overs)
Nigar Sultana 53* (40); Cherry-Ann Fraser 1/23 (3 overs)		Hayley Matthews 60* (54); Fahima Khatun 2/15 (3 overs)

West Indies won by 8 wickets
Warner Park Sporting Complex, Basseterre
Umpires: Lauren Agenbag (SA) and Jacqueline Williams (WI)
Player of the match: Deandra Dottin (WI)

- Bangladesh won the toss and elected to bat.

=== 2nd T20I ===
29 January 2025
18:00 (N)
Scorecard

West Indies; 201/6 (20 overs)	v	Bangladesh; 95/9 (20 overs)
Qiana Joseph 63 (36); Fahima Khatun 3/38 (4 overs)		Sharmin Akhter 22 (25); Hayley Matthews 2/6 (2 overs)

West Indies won by 106 runs
Warner Park Sporting Complex, Basseterre
Umpires: Lauren Agenbag (SA) and Jacqueline Williams (WI)
Player of the match: Qiana Joseph (WI)

- Bangladesh won the toss and elected to field.

=== 3rd T20I ===
31 January 2025
18:00 (N)
Scorecard

Bangladesh; 104/8 (20 overs)	v	West Indies; 105/5 (18.3 overs)
Nigar Sultana 33 (43); Jannillea Glasgow 3/15 (4 overs)		Shabika Gajnabi 27* (25); Fahima Khatun 2/14 (4 overs)

West Indies won by 5 wickets
Warner Park Sporting Complex, Basseterre
Umpires: Lauren Agenbag (SA) and Jacqueline Williams (WI)
Player of the match: Jannillea Glasgow (WI)

- West Indies won the toss and elected to field.
- Karishma Ramharack captained West Indies for the first time in T20Is.
