= Australia women's cricket team in Ireland in 2023 =

International cricket tour

	Ireland	Australia
- Dates: 23 – 28 July 2023
Captains	Laura Delany	Alyssa Healy (Note: Tahlia McGrath captained Australia in the third ODI.)

One Day International series
- Results: Australia won the 3-match series 2–0
Most runs	Orla Prendergast (80)	Annabel Sutherland (146)
Most wickets	Georgina Dempsey (4)	Kim Garth (4); Ashleigh Gardner (4); Tahlia McGrath (4)
- Player of the series: Ashleigh Gardner (Aus)

The Australia women's cricket team toured Ireland in July 2023 to play three One Day International (ODI) matches. The series formed a part of the 2022–2025 ICC Women's Championship. In March 2023, Cricket Ireland (CI) confirmed the dates of this tour. All matches of the series were played at Castle Avenue in Dublin. Australia had last toured Ireland for an ODI series in 2005.

The first match of the series was washed out. Australia won the next two ODIs to win the series 2–0.

== Squads ==
Ireland	Australia
Laura Delany (c); Ava Canning; Georgina Dempsey; Amy Hunter (wk); Shauna Kavanagh (wk); Arlene Kelly; Gaby Lewis; Louise Little; Jane Maguire; Aimee Maguire; Cara Murray; Leah Paul; Orla Prendergast; Rebecca Stokell; Mary Waldron (wk)	Alyssa Healy (c, wk); Tahlia McGrath (vc); Darcie Brown; Tess Flintoff; Ashleigh Gardner; Kim Garth; ~~Heather Graham~~; Grace Harris; Jess Jonassen; Alana King; Phoebe Litchfield; Beth Mooney (wk); Ellyse Perry; Annabel Sutherland; Georgia Wareham

Heather Graham was ruled out of the series due to a calf strain, with Tess Flintoff being named as her replacement in Australia's squad. Shauna Kavanagh was added to Ireland's squad before the third ODI, replacing Mary Waldron who was ruled out due to injury.

== ODI series ==
=== 1st ODI ===
23 July 2023
10:45
Scorecard

Ireland	v	Australia

Match abandoned
Castle Avenue, Dublin
Umpires: Mark Hawthorne (Ire) and Paul Reynolds (Ire)

- No toss.
- No play was possible due to rain.
- Women's Championship points: Ireland 1, Australia 1.

=== 2nd ODI ===
25 July 2023
10:45
Scorecard

Australia; 321/7 (50 overs)	v	Ireland; 168 (38.2 overs)
Ellyse Perry 91 (99); Georgina Dempsey 4/54 (10 overs)		Amy Hunter 50 (66); Georgia Wareham 3/33 (10 overs)

Australia won by 153 runs
Castle Avenue, Dublin
Umpires: Jareth McCready (Ire) and Paul Reynolds (Ire)
Player of the match: Ellyse Perry (Aus)

- Ireland won the toss and elected to field.
- Women's Championship points: Australia 2, Ireland 0.

=== 3rd ODI ===
28 July 2023
10:45
Scorecard

Ireland; 217 (49 overs)	v	Australia; 221/0 (35.5 overs)
Orla Prendergast 71 (109); Kim Garth 3/34 (8 overs)		Annabel Sutherland 109* (101)

Australia won by 10 wickets
Castle Avenue, Dublin
Umpires: Mark Hawthorne (Ire) and Jareth McCready (Ire)
Player of the match: Phoebe Litchfield (Aus)

- Australia won the toss and elected to field.
- Phoebe Litchfield and Annabel Sutherland (Aus) both scored their first centuries in ODIs.
- Women's Championship points: Australia 2, Ireland 0.
