= England women's cricket team in Ireland in 2024 =

International cricket tour

	Ireland	England
- Dates: 7 – 17 September 2024
Captains	Gaby Lewis	Kate Cross

One Day International series
- Results: England won the 3-match series 2–1
Most runs	Orla Prendergast (87)	Tammy Beaumont (212)
Most wickets	Aimee Maguire (7)	Kate Cross (9)
- Player of the series: Tammy Beaumont (Eng)

Twenty20 International series
- Results: 2-match series drawn 1–1
Most runs	Orla Prendergast (132)	Bryony Smith (86)
Most wickets	Aimee Maguire (5)	Kate Cross (3); Charis Pavely (3); Mady Villiers (3)
- Player of the series: Orla Prendergast (Ire)

The England women's cricket team toured Ireland in September 2024 to play the Ireland women's cricket team. The tour consisted of three One Day International (ODI) and two Twenty20 International (T20I) matches. The ODI series formed part of the 2022–2025 ICC Women's Championship. In April 2024, Cricket Ireland (CI) published the fixtures for the tour, as a part of the 2024 home international season.

The tour was originally scheduled to include three T20Is, but this was later reduced to two matches.

England included five debutants in the opening ODI, which they won by four wickets, after Kate Cross had taken 6 wickets. The tourists won the second ODI by 275 runs, their biggest margin of victory by runs, after Tammy Beaumont had scored 150 not out and Ireland were dismissed for their lowest ODI total (45). In the rain-affected third ODI, Aimee Maguire took her maiden five-wicket haul and inspired Ireland to a victory by 3 wickets, which went down to the last ball of the match.

England included four debutants in the first T20I, which they won by 67 runs. However, Ireland won the second match by five wickets, their first victory over England, to ensure that the series finished level.

== Squads ==
Ireland		England	
ODIs	T20Is	ODIs	T20Is
Gaby Lewis (c); Alana Dalzell; Sarah Forbes; Amy Hunter (wk); Arlene Kelly; Joanna Loughran (wk); Aimee Maguire; Jane Maguire; Leah Paul; Orla Prendergast; Una Raymond-Hoey; Freya Sargent; Rebecca Stokell; Alice Tector	Gaby Lewis (c); Ava Canning; Christina Coulter-Reilly (wk); Sarah Forbes; Amy Hunter (wk); Arlene Kelly; Louise Little; Aimee Maguire; Jane Maguire; Leah Paul; Orla Prendergast; ~~Una Raymond-Hoey~~; Freya Sargent; Rebecca Stokell; Alice Tector	Kate Cross (c); Hollie Armitage; Hannah Baker; Tammy Beaumont (wk); Georgia Davis; Lauren Filer; Bess Heath (wk); Freya Kemp; Emma Lamb; Ryana MacDonald-Gay; Paige Scholfield; Seren Smale (wk); Bryony Smith; Mady Villiers; Issy Wong	Kate Cross (c); Georgia Adams; Hollie Armitage; Hannah Baker; Tammy Beaumont (wk); Mahika Gaur; Katie George; Ryana MacDonald-Gay; Charis Pavely; Paige Scholfield; Seren Smale (wk); Bryony Smith; Mady Villiers; Issy Wong

England named a second-string squad for the tour, which included only Bess Heath and Freya Kemp from the squad selected for October's 2024 Women's T20 World Cup. Kate Cross was chosen to captain England for the first time. On 10 September 2024, Seren Smale was added to the ODI squad for the 3rd ODI. Katie George was added to the T20I squad as cover for Mahika Gaur. On 13 September 2024, Una Raymond-Hoey withdrew from Ireland's T20I squad due to injury and was replaced by Louise Little.

== ODI series ==
=== 1st ODI ===
7 September 2024
10:45
Scorecard

Ireland; 210 (46.5 overs)	v	England; 211/6 (34.5 overs)
Orla Prendergast 76 (87); Kate Cross 6/30 (9.5 overs)		Hollie Armitage 44 (44); Orla Prendergast 2/27 (6 overs)

England won by 4 wickets
Stormont, Belfast
Umpires: Lauren Agenbag (SA) and Roland Black (Ire)
Player of the match: Kate Cross (Eng)

- Ireland won the toss and elected to bat.
- Hollie Armitage, Hannah Baker, Ryana MacDonald-Gay, Paige Scholfield and Mady Villiers (Eng) all made their ODI debuts.
- Women's Championship Points: England 2, Ireland 0.

=== 2nd ODI ===
9 September 2024
10:45
Scorecard

England; 320/8 (50 overs)	v	Ireland; 45 (16.5 overs)
Tammy Beaumont 150* (139); Freya Sargent 2/60 (10 overs)		Una Raymond-Hoey 22 (37); Kate Cross 3/8 (4 overs)

England won by 275 runs
Stormont, Belfast
Umpires: Lauren Agenbag (SA) and Jonathan Kennedy (Ire)
Player of the match: Tammy Beaumont (Eng)

- England won the toss and elected to bat.
- Georgia Davis (Eng) made her ODI debut.
- Tammy Beaumont (Eng) scored her 4,000th run and 10th century (the most by an England women's player) in ODIs.
- Ireland scored their lowest total in ODIs.
- England recorded their highest margin of victory (by runs) in ODIs.
- Women's Championship Points: England 2, Ireland 0.

=== 3rd ODI ===
11 September 2024
10:45
Scorecard

England; 153 (20.5 overs)	v	Ireland; 155/7 (22 overs)
Tammy Beaumont 52 (42); Aimee Maguire 5/19 (3.5 overs)		Gaby Lewis 72 (56); Mady Villiers 3/30 (5 overs)

Ireland won by 3 wickets (DLS method)
Stormont, Belfast
Umpires: Lauren Agenbag (SA) and Roland Black (Ire)
Player of the match: Aimee Maguire (Ire)

- England won the toss and elected to bat.
- The match was reduced to 22 overs per side due to rain. Ireland were set a revised target of 155 from 22 overs.
- Aimee Maguire (Ire) took her first five-wicket haul in ODIs.
- Women's Championship Points: Ireland 2, England 0.

== T20I series ==
=== 1st T20I ===
14 September 2024
15:00
Scorecard

England; 176 (20 overs)	v	Ireland; 109 (18.3 overs)
Bryony Smith 58 (30); Aimee Maguire 3/30 (4 overs); Freya Sargent 3/30 (4 overs)		Orla Prendergast 52 (34); Charis Pavely 3/19 (4 overs)

England won by 67 runs
Castle Avenue, Clontarf
Umpires: Lauren Agenbag (SA) and Jonathan Kennedy (Ire)
Player of the match: Bryony Smith (Eng)

- Ireland won the toss and elected to field.
- Georgia Adams, Charis Pavely, Paige Scholfield and Seren Smale (Eng) all made their T20I debuts.

=== 2nd T20I ===
15 September 2024
15:00
Scorecard

England; 169/8 (20 overs)	v	Ireland; 170/5 (19.5 overs)
Tammy Beaumont 40 (34); Arlene Kelly 2/22 (4 overs)		Orla Prendergast 80 (51); Kate Cross 2/29 (4 overs)

Ireland won by 5 wickets
Castle Avenue, Clontarf
Umpires: Lauren Agenbag (SA) and Roland Black (Ire)
Player of the match: Orla Prendergast (Ire)

- Ireland won the toss and elected to field.
- Ryana MacDonald-Gay (Eng) made her T20I debut.
- This was Ireland's first win against England in women's T20Is.
