= Zimbabwe women's cricket team in Ireland in 2025 =

International cricket tour

	Ireland	Zimbabwe
- Dates: 20 – 28 July 2025
Captains	Gaby Lewis	Chipo Mugeri-Tiripano

One Day International series
- Results: Ireland won the 2-match series 2–0
Most runs	Orla Prendergast (117)	Chipo Mugeri-Tiripano (104)
Most wickets	Lara McBride (5)	Loreen Tshuma (6)
- Player of the series: Orla Prendergast (Ire)

Twenty20 International series
- Results: Ireland won the 3-match series 3–0
Most runs	Gaby Lewis (154)	Chipo Mugeri-Tiripano (92)
Most wickets	Cara Murray (7)	Beloved Biza (2); Kudzai Chigora (2); Tendai Makusha (2)
- Player of the series: Gaby Lewis (Ire)

The Zimbabwe women's cricket team toured Ireland in July 2025 to play the Ireland women's cricket team. The tour consisted of two One Day International (ODI) and three Twenty20 International (T20I) matches. In March 2025, the Cricket Ireland (CI) confirmed the fixtures for the tour, as a part of the 2025 home international season.

Ireland won the first T20I by six wickets with Gaby Lewis scored 67 runs and Cara Murray's 3-for. Gaby Lewis' 87 runs and Cara Murray's 3-for, the hosts won the second T20I by 65 runs and sealed the series. Ireland won the third and last game of the T20I series by 51 runs, with Amy Hunter scored a half century and Sophie MacMahon took 3 wickets and the hosts clean swept the series 3-0.

Ireland won the first ODI by 97 runs very comfortably with three half centuries such are Orla Prendergast (50), Sarah Forbes (54) and Gaby Lewis (51), and lead the series 1-0. The hosts won the second and last ODI by four wickets, with the Orla Prendergast scord unbeaten 67 runs and Lara McBride took four wickets, and clean swept the series.

== Squads ==
Ireland		Zimbabwe
ODIs	T20Is	ODIs & T20Is
Gaby Lewis (c); Orla Prendergast (vc); Ava Canning; Christina Coulter Reilly (wk); Alana Dalzell; Laura Delany; Sarah Forbes; Amy Hunter (wk); Arlene Kelly; Louise Little; Jane Maguire; Lara McBride; Cara Murray; Leah Paul	Gaby Lewis (c); Orla Prendergast (vc); Ava Canning; Christina Coulter Reilly (wk); Laura Delany; Amy Hunter (wk); Arlene Kelly; Louise Little; Sophie MacMahon; Jane Maguire; Lara McBride; Cara Murray; Leah Paul; Rebecca Stokell	Chipo Mugeri-Tiripano (c); Beloved Biza; Francisca Chipare; Kudzai Chigora; Chiedza Dhururu (wk); Nyasha Gwanzura; Lindokuhle Mabhero; Tendai Makusha; Mitchel Mavunga; Modester Mupachikwa (wk); Vimbai Mutungwindu; Kelis Ndhlovu; Runyararo Pasipanodya; Nomvelo Sibanda; Loreen Tshuma

== T20I series ==
=== 1st T20I ===
20 July 2025
16:00
Scorecard

Zimbabwe; 117/9 (20 overs)	v	Ireland; 118/4 (16.5 overs)
Chipo Mugeri-Tiripano 42 (50); Cara Murray 3/19 (4 overs)		Gaby Lewis 67 (49); Kudzai Chigora 2/18 (3.5 overs)

Ireland won by 6 wickets
Sydney Parade, Dublin
Umpires: Kim Cotton (NZ) and Mark Hawthorne (Ire)
Player of the match: Gaby Lewis (Ire)

- Ireland won the toss and elected to field.
- Lara McBride (Ire) and Tendai Makusha (Zim) both made their T20I debuts.
- Orla Prendergast (Ire) played in her 100th international match.
- Arlene Kelly (Ire) took her 100th wicket in international cricket.
- Amy Hunter (Ire) scored her 1,000th run in T20Is.
- Gaby Lewis became the first Irish woman to pass 4,000 runs across all formats.

=== 2nd T20I ===
22 July 2025
16:00
Scorecard

Ireland; 176/4 (20 overs)	v	Zimbabwe; 111 (20 overs)
Gaby Lewis 87 (50); Tendai Makusha 2/30 (4 overs)		Kelis Ndhlovu 46 (40); Cara Murray 3/17 (4 overs)

Ireland won by 65 runs
Sydney Parade, Dublin
Umpires: Kim Cotton (NZ) and Jonathan Kennedy (Ire)
Player of the match: Gaby Lewis (Ire)

- Zimbabwe won the toss and elected to field.
- Cara Murray (Ire) played her 50th T20I match.

=== 3rd T20I ===
23 July 2025
16:00
Scorecard

Ireland; 180/4 (20 overs)	v	Zimbabwe; 129/7 (20 overs)
Amy Hunter 59 (40); Beloved Biza 2/21 (4 overs)		Chipo Mugeri-Tiripano 39 (42); Sophie MacMahon 3/21 (4 overs)

Ireland won by 51 runs
Sydney Parade, Dublin
Umpires: Kim Cotton (NZ) and Jonathan Kennedy (Ire)
Player of the match: Amy Hunter (Ire)

- Ireland won the toss and elected to bat.
- Amy Hunter (Ire) scored her 2,000th run in international cricket.

== ODI series ==
=== 1st ODI ===
26 July 2025
10:45
Scorecard

Ireland; 288/9 (50 overs)	v	Zimbabwe; 191 (48.1 overs)
Sarah Forbes 54 (78); Kelis Ndhlovu 3/50 (9 overs)		Chipo Mugeri-Tiripano 48 (65); Orla Prendergast 2/20 (10 overs)

Ireland won by 97 runs
Stormont Cricket Ground, Belfast
Umpires: Roland Black (Ire) and Kim Cotton (NZ)
Player of the match: Orla Prendergast (Ire)

- Zimbabwe won the toss and elected to field.
- Lara McBride (Ire) made her ODI debut.
- Orla Prendergast and Amy Hunter (Ire) both scored their 1,000th run in ODIs.
- Cara Murray (Ire) took her 50th wicket in ODIs.

=== 2nd ODI ===
28 July 2025
10:45
Scorecard

Zimbabwe; 178 (49.1 overs)	v	Ireland; 182/6 (38.5 overs)
Chipo Mugeri-Tiripano 56 (92); Alana Dalzell 4/36 (10 overs)		Orla Prendergast 67* (72); Loreen Tshuma 4/35 (10 overs)

Ireland won by 4 wickets
Stormont Cricket Ground, Belfast
Umpires: Roland Black (Ire) and Kim Cotton (NZ)
Player of the match: Orla Prendergast (Ire)

- Zimbabwe won the toss and elected to bat.
- Leah Paul (Ire) played in her 100th international match.
