= 2026 Scotland Women's Tri-Nation Series =

- Date: 28 May - 4 June 2026
- Location: Scotland
- Result: Scotland won the series
Teams
Bangladesh	Netherlands	Scotland
Captains
Nigar Sultana	Babette de Leede	Kathryn Bryce
Most runs
Nigar Sultana (190)	Heather Siegers (120)	Kathryn Bryce (161)
Most wickets
Ritu Moni (7)	Heather Siegers (5)	Kirstie Gordon (5); Kathryn Bryce (5)

The 2026 Scotland Women's Tri-Nation Series was an international cricket series which took place in Scotland from 28 May to 4 June 2026. It was a tri-nation series contested by the women's national teams of Scotland, Bangladesh and the Netherlands. All matches were played at the The Grange Club, Edinburgh. This tournament served as preparation for all three teams ahead of the 2026 Women's T20 World Cup.

Scotland won the tri-series after winning three of their four matches.

== Squads ==
Bangladesh	Netherlands	Scotland
Nigar Sultana (c, wk); Nahida Akter (vc); Dilara Akter; Marufa Akter; Sharmin Akhter; Shorna Akter; Juairiya Ferdous; Fahima Khatun; Rabeya Khan; Sultana Khatun; Sanjida Akter Meghla; Ritu Moni; Sobhana Mostary; Taj Nehar; Fariha Trisna	Babette de Leede (c); Caroline de Lange; Sterre Kalis; Sanya Khurana; Rosalie Ann Lawrence (wk); Hannah Landheer; Lara Leemhuis; Phebe Molkenboer; Frederique Overdijk; Robine Rijke; Heather Siegers; Silver Siegers; Myrthe van den Raad; Isabel van der Woning; Iris Zwilling	Kathryn Bryce (c); Sarah Bryce (wk); Chloe Abel; Olivia Bell; Darcey Carter; Priyanaz Chatterji; Gabriella Fontenla; Katherine Fraser; Kirstie Gordon; Ailsa Lister (wk); Maisie Maceira; Abtaha Maqsood; Megan McColl; Niamh Robertson-Jack; Rachel Slater; Ellen Watson

== Points table ==
Pos	Team	Pld	W	L	NR	Pts	NRR
1	Scotland	4	3	1	0	6	1.036
2	Bangladesh	4	2	2	0	4	0.059
3	Netherlands	4	1	3	0	2	−1.395

Source: ESPNcricinfo

== Fixtures ==
28 May 2026
13:00
Scorecard

Netherlands; 141/8 (20 overs)	v	Scotland; 144/1 (14.5 overs)
Robine Rijke 46 (44); Kirstie Gordon 3/27 (4 overs)		Katherine Fraser 56* (41); Frederique Overdijk 1/18 (2 overs)

Scotland won by 9 wickets
The Grange Club, Edinburgh
Umpires: Iain McDonald (Sco) and David McLean (Sco)
Player of the match: Katherine Fraser (Sco)

- Netherlands won the toss and elected to bat.
- Gabriella Fontenla (Sco) and Rosalie Ann Lawrence (Ned) both made their T20I debuts.

30 May 2026
14:00
Scorecard

Bangladesh; 133/5 (20 overs)	v	Scotland; 134/2 (15.4 overs)
Nigar Sultana 46* (39); Gabriella Fontenla 1/11 (4 overs)		Kathryn Bryce 54* (32); Shorna Akter 1/19 (2 overs)

Scotland won by 8 wickets
The Grange Club, Edinburgh
Umpires: David McLean (Sco) and Ryan Milne (Sco)
Player of the match: Gabriella Fontenla (Sco)

- Bangladesh won the toss and elected to bat.

31 May 2026
13:00
Scorecard

Netherlands; 162/5 (20 overs)	v	Bangladesh; 154/8 (20 overs)
Heather Siegers 52 (43); Fariha Trisna 2/26 (4 overs)		Nigar Sultana 77 (51); Heather Siegers 3/39 (4 overs)

Netherlands won by 8 runs
The Grange Club, Edinburgh
Umpires: Iain McDonald (Sco) and Ryan Milne (Sco)
Player of the match: Heather Siegers (Ned)

- Bangladesh won the toss and elected to field.

2 June 2026
13:00
Scorecard

Bangladesh; 152/6 (20 overs)	v	Scotland; 118 (19 overs)
Nigar Sultana 58 (47); Maisie Maceira 2/23 (3 overs)		Sarah Bryce 40 (41); Ritu Moni 4/12 (2 overs)

Bangladesh won by 34 runs
The Grange Club, Edinburgh
Umpires: Iain McDonald (Sco) and David McLean (Sco)
Player of the match: Nigar Sultana (Ban)

- Bangladesh won the toss and elected to bat.
- Maisie Maceira (Sco) made her T20I debut.

3 June 2026
13:00
Scorecard

Scotland; 124/3 (12 overs)	v	Netherlands; 80/6 (10 overs)
Kathryn Bryce 63 (33); Caroline de Lange 1/11 (1 overs)		Sterre Kalis 28 (22); Chloe Abel 2/8 (2 overs)

Scotland won by 24 runs (DLS method)
The Grange Club, Edinburgh
Umpires: Iain McDonald (Sco) and Ryan Milne (Sco)
Player of the match: Kathryn Bryce (Sco)

- Netherlands won the toss and elected to field.
- The match was reduced to 12 overs in the first innings and 10 overs in the second innings due to rain. Netherlands were set a revised target of 105 runs in 10 overs.

4 June 2026
13:00
Scorecard

Bangladesh; 98/3 (8 overs)	v	Netherlands; 85/5 (8 overs)
Dilara Akter 51 (26); Myrthe van den Raad 1/16 (1 overs)		Babette de Leede 30 (14); Ritu Moni 2/11 (2 overs)

Bangladesh won by 13 runs
The Grange Club, Edinburgh
Umpires: David McLean (Sco) and Ryan Milne (Sco)
Player of the match: Dilara Akter (Ban)

- Netherlands won the toss and elected to field.
- The match was reduced to 8 overs per side due to rain.
