= 2022–2025 ICC Women's Championship =

Cricket tournament

- Dates: 1 June 2022 – 24 January 2025
- Administrator: International Cricket Council
- Cricket format: One Day International
- Tournament format: Round-robin
- Host: Various
- Champions: Australia (3rd title)
- Runners-up: India
- Most runs: (India) Smriti Mandhana (1,358)
- Most wickets: (India) Deepti Sharma (42)

The 2022–2025 ICC Women's Championship was the third edition of the ICC Women's Championship, a One Day International (ODI) cricket competition that was contested by ten teams, to determine qualification for the 2025 Women's Cricket World Cup. The top five teams, along with the hosts India, qualified directly for the World Cup. The bottom four teams of this tournament and the top two teams from the ICC ODI rankings progressed to the Women's Cricket World Cup Qualifier tournament. Each team played a total of eight three-match series, with four of them played at home, and four played away.

Australia were the two-time defending champions, having won the 2014–2016 ICC Women's Championship and the 2017–2020 ICC Women's Championship. England, India, New Zealand, Pakistan, South Africa, Sri Lanka and the West Indies also competed in the first two editions of the Women's Championship.

In September 2018, the International Cricket Council (ICC) announced that they were exploring the option to expand the Women's Championship from eight teams to ten teams, therefore including Bangladesh and Ireland in future editions of the competition. It was originally decided that the 2021 Women's Cricket World Cup Qualifier would be used to determine the new teams, but when the tournament was called off midway through due to the discovery of a new variant of COVID-19 in Southern Africa, Bangladesh and Ireland joined the ICC Women's Championship for this cycle, based on their ODI rankings.

In March 2022, Cricket Ireland was the first cricket board to confirm fixtures for the 2022–2025 ICC Women's Championship, when they announced Ireland's home series against South Africa for June 2022. Later in March 2022, the Pakistan Cricket Board (PCB) confirmed three series, with two of those at home, against Sri Lanka and Ireland, and a tour to Australia. Pakistan's home series against Sri Lanka was the first series of the 2022–2025 ICC Women's Championship.

== Teams ==
The following teams were part of the Women's Championship:

- Australia
- Bangladesh
- England
- India
- Ireland
- New Zealand
- Pakistan
- South Africa
- Sri Lanka
- West Indies

== Schedule ==
The ICC announced the following home and away schedule for each team:

Home \ Away	(Australia)	(Bangladesh)	(England)	(India)	(Ireland)	(New Zealand)	(Pakistan)	(South Africa)	(Sri Lanka)	(Cricket West Indies)
Australia		—	—	3–0	—	—	3–0	2–1	—	2–0
Bangladesh	0–3		—	1–1	3–0	—	2–1	—	—	—
England	2–1	—		0–3	—	—	2–0	—	2–0	—
India	—	—	—		3–0	2–1	—	3–0	—	3–0
Ireland	0–2	—	1–2	—		—	—	0–3	2–1	—
New Zealand	0–2	1–0	1–2	—	—		2–1	—	—	—
Pakistan	—	—	—	—	3–0	—		1–2	2–1	0–3
South Africa	—	2–1	1–2	—	—	2–1	—		1–1	—
Sri Lanka	—	1–0	—	0–3	—	2–1	—	—		3–0
West Indies	—	2–1	0–3	—	2–0	1–2	—	—	—	

Source: ESPNcricinfo
Legend: Blue = home team win; Yellow = draw; Red = away team win.

Team	Played at									
Team	(Australia)	(Bangladesh)	(England)	(India)	(Ireland)	(New Zealand)	(Pakistan)	(South Africa)	(Sri Lanka)	(Cricket West Indies)
Australia	—N/a	Away	Away	Home	Away	Away	Home	Home	No	Home
Bangladesh	Home	—N/a	No	Home	Home	Away	Home	Away	Away	Away
England	Home	No	—N/a	Home	Away	Away	Home	Away	Home	Away
India	Away	Away	Away	—N/a	Home	Home	No	Home	Away	Home
Ireland	Home	Away	Home	Away	—N/a	No	Away	Home	Home	Away
New Zealand	Home	Home	Home	Away	No	—N/a	Home	Away	Away	Away
Pakistan	Away	Away	Away	No	Home	Away	—N/a	Home	Home	Home
South Africa	Away	Home	Home	Away	Away	Home	Away	—N/a	Home	No
Sri Lanka	No	Home	Away	Home	Away	Home	Away	Away	—N/a	Home
West Indies	Away	Home	Home	Away	Home	Home	Away	No	Away	—N/a

== Points table ==
Pos	Team	Pld	W	L	T	NR	Pts	NRR	Qualification
1	Australia	24	18	3	0	3	39	2.130	Advanced to the 2025 Women's Cricket World Cup (Note: India qualify automatically as hosts.)
2	India	24	18	5	1	0	37	1.058	Advanced to the 2025 Women's Cricket World Cup
3	England	24	15	7	0	2	32	1.436	Advanced to the 2025 Women's Cricket World Cup
4	South Africa	24	12	11	0	1	25	0.230	Advanced to the 2025 Women's Cricket World Cup
5	Sri Lanka	24	9	11	0	4	22	−0.107	Advanced to the 2025 Women's Cricket World Cup
6	New Zealand	24	9	12	0	3	21	0.129	Advanced to the 2025 Women's Cricket World Cup
7	Bangladesh	24	8	11	1	4	21	−0.678	Advanced to the 2025 Women's Cricket World Cup Qualifier
8	West Indies	24	8	14	0	2	18	−1.126	Advanced to the 2025 Women's Cricket World Cup Qualifier
9	Pakistan	24	8	15	0	1	17	−0.613	Advanced to the 2025 Women's Cricket World Cup Qualifier
10	Ireland	24	3	19	0	2	8	−2.193	Advanced to the 2025 Women's Cricket World Cup Qualifier

Source: ESPNcricinfo International Cricket Council

== Fixtures ==
=== 2022 ===
==== Pakistan v Sri Lanka ====
1 June 2022
Scorecard

Sri Lanka; 169 (47.5 overs)	v	Pakistan; 170/2 (41.5 overs)

Pakistan won by 8 wickets
Southend Club Cricket Stadium, Karachi
Points: Pakistan 2, Sri Lanka 0

3 June 2022
Scorecard

Pakistan; 253/2 (50 overs)	v	Sri Lanka; 180/9 (50 overs)

Pakistan won by 73 runs
Southend Club Cricket Stadium, Karachi
Points: Pakistan 2, Sri Lanka 0

5 June 2022
Scorecard

Sri Lanka; 260/7 (50 overs)	v	Pakistan; 167 (41.4 overs)

Sri Lanka won by 93 runs
Southend Club Cricket Stadium, Karachi
Points: Pakistan 0, Sri Lanka 2

==== Ireland v South Africa ====
11 June 2022
Scorecard

Ireland; 69 (27.2 overs)	v	South Africa; 70/1 (16 overs)

South Africa won by 9 wickets
Clontarf Cricket Club Ground, Dublin
Points: Ireland 0, South Africa 2

14 June 2022
Scorecard

Ireland; 213/8 (50 overs)	v	South Africa; 217/1 (38.4 overs)

South Africa won by 9 wickets
Clontarf Cricket Club Ground, Dublin
Points: Ireland 0, South Africa 2

17 June 2022
Scorecard

South Africa; 278/5 (50 overs)	v	Ireland; 89 (32.5 overs)

South Africa won by 189 runs
Clontarf Cricket Club Ground, Dublin
Points: Ireland 0, South Africa 2

==== Sri Lanka v India ====
1 July 2022
Scorecard

Sri Lanka; 171 (48.2 overs)	v	India; 176/6 (38 overs)

India won by 4 wickets
Pallekele International Cricket Stadium, Kandy
Points: Sri Lanka 0, India 2

4 July 2022
Scorecard

Sri Lanka; 173 (50 overs)	v	India; 174/0 (25.4 overs)

India won by 10 wickets
Pallekele International Cricket Stadium, Kandy
Points: Sri Lanka 0, India 2

7 July 2022
Scorecard

India; 255/9 (50 overs)	v	Sri Lanka; 216 (47.3 overs)

India won by 39 runs
Pallekele International Cricket Stadium, Kandy
Points: Sri Lanka 0, India 2

==== England v India ====
18 September 2022
Scorecard

England; 227/7 (50 overs)	v	India; 232/3 (44.2 overs)

India won by 7 wickets
County Cricket Ground, Hove
Points: England 0, India 2

21 September 2022 (D/N)
Scorecard

India; 333/5 (50 overs)	v	England; 245 (44.2 overs)

India won by 88 runs
St Lawrence Ground, Canterbury
Points: England 0, India 2

24 September 2022
Scorecard

India; 169 (45.4 overs)	v	England; 153 (43.3 overs)

India won by 16 runs
Lord's, London
Points: England 0, India 2

=== 2022–23 ===
==== West Indies v New Zealand ====
19 September 2022
Scorecard

West Indies; 168/7 (35 overs)	v	New Zealand; 159/5 (33 overs)

New Zealand won by 5 runs (DLS Method)
Sir Vivian Richards Stadium, North Sound
Points: West Indies 0, New Zealand 2

22 September 2022
Scorecard

West Indies; 169/9 (50 overs)	v	New Zealand; 171/8 (40.1 overs)

New Zealand won by 2 wickets
Sir Vivian Richards Stadium, North Sound
Points: West Indies 0, New Zealand 2

25 September 2022
Scorecard

New Zealand; 168 (48.1 overs)	v	West Indies; 169/6 (43.4 overs)

West Indies won by 4 wickets
Sir Vivian Richards Stadium, North Sound
Points: West Indies 2, New Zealand 0

==== Pakistan v Ireland ====
4 November 2022
Scorecard

Pakistan; 335/3 (50 overs)	v	Ireland; 207 (49.3 overs)

Pakistan won by 128 runs
Gaddafi Stadium, Lahore
Points: Pakistan 2, Ireland 0

6 November 2022
Scorecard

Ireland; 194 (47.2 overs)	v	Pakistan; 195/1 (32.4 overs)

Pakistan won by 9 wickets
Gaddafi Stadium, Lahore
Points: Pakistan 2, Ireland 0

9 November 2022
Scorecard

Ireland; 225 (49.5 overs)	v	Pakistan; 226/5 (47.1 overs)

Pakistan won by 5 wickets
Gaddafi Stadium, Lahore
Points: Pakistan 2, Ireland 0

==== West Indies v England ====
4 December 2022 (D/N)
Scorecard

England; 307/7 (50 overs)	v	West Indies; 165 (40.3 overs)

England won by 142 runs
Sir Vivian Richards Stadium, North Sound
Points: West Indies 0, England 2

6 December 2022 (D/N)
Scorecard

England; 260 (48.1 overs)	v	West Indies; 118 (31.3 overs)

England won by 142 runs
Sir Vivian Richards Stadium, North Sound
Points: West Indies 0, England 2

9 December 2022 (D/N)
Scorecard

England; 256 (43.3 overs)	v	West Indies; 105 (37.3 overs)

England won by 151 runs
Sir Vivian Richards Stadium, North Sound
Points: West Indies 0, England 2

==== New Zealand v Bangladesh ====
11 December 2022
Scorecard

Bangladesh; 180/8 (50 overs)	v	New Zealand; 181/2 (31 overs)

New Zealand won by 8 wickets
Basin Reserve, Wellington
Points: New Zealand 2, Bangladesh 0

14 December 2022 (D/N)
Scorecard

Bangladesh; 157/7 (44 overs)	v	New Zealand; 14/1 (4.4 overs)

No result
McLean Park, Napier
Points: New Zealand 1, Bangladesh 1

17 December 2022 (D/N)
Scorecard

New Zealand; 123/2 (26.5 overs)	v	Bangladesh

No result
Seddon Park, Hamilton
Points: New Zealand 1, Bangladesh 1

==== Australia v Pakistan ====
16 January 2023
Scorecard

Pakistan; 8/160 (40 overs)	v	Australia; 2/158 (28.5 overs)

Australia won by 8 wickets (DLS method)
Allan Border Field, Brisbane
Points: Australia 2, Pakistan 0

18 January 2023
Scorecard

Pakistan; 125 (43 overs)	v	Australia; 0/129 (19.2 overs)

Australia won by 10 wickets
Allan Border Field, Brisbane
Points: Australia 2, Pakistan 0

21 January 2023
Scorecard

Australia; 9/336 (50 overs)	v	Pakistan; 7/235 (50 overs)

Australia won by 101 runs
North Sydney Oval, Sydney
Points: Australia 2, Pakistan 0

=== 2023 ===
==== Sri Lanka v Bangladesh ====
29 April 2023
Scorecard

Sri Lanka; 152/6 (36.4 overs)	v	Bangladesh

No result
P. Sara Oval, Colombo
Points: Sri Lanka 1, Bangladesh 1

2 May 2023
Scorecard

Sri Lanka	v	Bangladesh

Match abandoned
P. Sara Oval, Colombo
Points: Sri Lanka 1, Bangladesh 1

4 May 2023
Scorecard

Sri Lanka; 186/5 (30 overs)	v	Bangladesh; 128 (29.5 overs)

Sri Lanka won by 58 runs
Singhalese Sports Club Cricket Ground, Colombo
Points: Sri Lanka 2, Bangladesh 0

==== West Indies v Ireland ====
26 June 2023
Scorecard

West Indies; 297/6 (50 overs)	v	Ireland; 239/9 (50 overs)

West Indies won by 58 runs
Daren Sammy Cricket Ground, Rodney Bay
Points: West Indies 2, Ireland 0

28 June 2023
Scorecard

Ireland; 36/5 (8.4 overs)	v	West Indies

No result
Daren Sammy Cricket Ground, Rodney Bay
Points: West Indies 1, Ireland 1

1 July 2023 (D/N)
Scorecard

Ireland; 203 (50 overs)	v	West Indies; 204/4 (41.1 overs)

West Indies won by 6 wickets
Daren Sammy Cricket Ground, Rodney Bay
Points: West Indies 2, Ireland 0

==== Sri Lanka v New Zealand ====
27 June 2023
Scorecard

New Zealand; 170/5 (28 overs)	v	Sri Lanka; 175/1 (27 overs)

Sri Lanka won by 9 wickets (DLS method)
Galle International Stadium, Galle
Points: Sri Lanka 2, New Zealand 0

30 June 2023
Scorecard

New Zealand; 329/7 (50 overs)	v	Sri Lanka; 213 (48.4 overs)

New Zealand won by 111 runs
Galle International Stadium, Galle
Points: Sri Lanka 0, New Zealand 2

3 July 2023
Scorecard

New Zealand; 127/2 (31 overs)	v	Sri Lanka; 196/2 (26.5 overs)

Sri Lanka won by 8 wickets (DLS method)
Galle International Stadium, Galle
Points: Sri Lanka 2, New Zealand 0

==== England v Australia ====
12 July 2023 (D/N)
Scorecard

Australia; 263/8 (50 overs)	v	England; 267/8 (48.1 overs)

England won by 2 wickets
Bristol County Ground, Bristol
Points: England 2, Australia 0

16 July 2023
Scorecard

Australia; 282/7 (50 overs)	v	England; 279/7 (50 overs)

Australia won by 3 runs
Rose Bowl, Southampton
Points: England 0, Australia 2

18 July 2023 (D/N)
Scorecard

England; 285/9 (50 overs)	v	Australia; 199 (35.3 overs)

England won by 69 runs (DLS method)
County Ground, Taunton
Points: England 2, Australia 0

==== Bangladesh v India ====
16 July 2023
Scorecard

Bangladesh; 152 (43 overs)	v	India; 113 (35.5 overs)

Bangladesh won by 40 runs (DLS method)
Sher-e-Bangla National Stadium, Dhaka
Points: Bangladesh 2, India 0

19 July 2023
Scorecard

India; 228/8 (50 overs)	v	Bangladesh; 120 (35.1 overs)

India won by 108 runs
Sher-e-Bangla National Stadium, Dhaka
Points: Bangladesh 0, India 2

22 July 2023
Scorecard

Bangladesh; 225/4 (50 overs)	v	India; 225 (49.3 overs)

Match tied
Sher-e-Bangla National Stadium, Dhaka
Points: Bangladesh 1, India 1

==== Ireland v Australia ====
23 July 2023
Scorecard

Ireland	v	Australia

Match abandoned
Clontarf Cricket Club Ground, Dublin
Points: Ireland 1, Australia 1

25 July 2023
Scorecard

Australia; 321/7 (50 overs)	v	Ireland; 168 (38.2 overs)

Australia won by 153 runs
Clontarf Cricket Club Ground, Dublin
Points: Ireland 0, Australia 2

28 July 2023
Scorecard

Ireland; 217 (49 overs)	v	Australia; 221/0 (35.5 overs)

Australia won by 10 wickets
Clontarf Cricket Club Ground, Dublin
Points: Ireland 0, Australia 2

==== Pakistan v South Africa ====
8 September 2023 (D/N)
Scorecard

South Africa; 292/4 (50 overs)	v	Pakistan; 165 (36.5 overs)

South Africa won by 127 runs
National Stadium, Karachi
Points: Pakistan 0, South Africa 2

11 September 2023 (D/N)
Scorecard

Pakistan; 168 (44.2 overs)	v	South Africa; 169/4 (34 overs)

South Africa won by 6 wickets
National Stadium, Karachi
Points: Pakistan 0, South Africa 2

14 September 2023 (D/N)
Scorecard

South Africa; 185 (48.1 overs)	v	Pakistan; 186/2 (38 overs)

Pakistan won by 8 wickets
National Stadium, Karachi
Points: Pakistan 2, South Africa 0

==== England v Sri Lanka ====
9 September 2023
Scorecard

Sri Lanka; 106 (30.2 overs)	v	England; 107/3 (18 overs)

England won by 7 wickets
Riverside Ground, Chester-le-Street
Points: England 2, Sri Lanka 0

12 September 2023
Scorecard

Sri Lanka; 106/9 (30.5 overs)	v	England

No result
County Ground, Northampton
Points: England 1, Sri Lanka 1

14 September 2023
Scorecard

England; 273/8 (31 overs)	v	Sri Lanka; 122 (24.5 overs)

England won by 161 runs
Grace Road, Leicester
Points: England 2, Sri Lanka 0

=== 2023–24 ===
==== South Africa v New Zealand ====
24 September 2023
Scorecard

New Zealand; 235/8 (50 overs)	v	South Africa; 236/6 (47.1 overs)

South Africa won by 4 wickets
JB Marks Oval, Potchefstroom
Points: South Africa 2, New Zealand 0

28 September 2023
Scorecard

New Zealand; 253 (49.5 overs)	v	South Africa; 257/3 (45.2 overs)

South Africa won by 7 wickets
City Oval, Pietermaritzburg
Points: South Africa 2, New Zealand 0

1 October 2023
Scorecard

South Africa; 209 (44.3 overs)	v	New Zealand; 210/4 (43.2 overs)

New Zealand won by 6 wickets
Kingsmead Cricket Ground, Durban
Points: South Africa 0, New Zealand 2

==== Australia v West Indies ====
8 October 2023
Scorecard

West Indies; 83 (27.3 overs)	v	Australia; 2/87 (14.5 overs)

Australia won by 8 wickets
Allan Border Field, Brisbane
Points: Australia 2, West Indies 0

12 October 2023
Scorecard

West Indies; 8/107 (25.3 overs)	v	Australia

No result
Junction Oval, Melbourne
Points: Australia 1, West Indies 1

15 October 2023
Scorecard

West Indies; 103 (31.4 overs)	v	Australia; 2/106 (15.3 overs)

Australia won by 8 wickets
Junction Oval, Melbourne
Points: Australia 2, West Indies 0

==== Bangladesh v Pakistan ====
4 November 2023
Scorecard

Bangladesh; 81 (31.5 overs)	v	Pakistan; 85/5 (24.5 overs)

Pakistan won by 5 wickets
Sher-e-Bangla National Cricket Stadium, Dhaka
Points: Bangladesh 0, Pakistan 2

7 November 2023
Scorecard

Bangladesh; 169/9 (50 overs)	v	Pakistan; 169 (49.5 overs)

Match tied (Bangladesh won the Super Over)
Sher-e-Bangla National Cricket Stadium, Dhaka
Points: Bangladesh 2, Pakistan 0

10 November 2023
Scorecard

Pakistan; 166/9 (50 Overs)	v	Bangladesh; 167/3 (45.4 Overs)

Bangladesh won by 7 wickets
Sher-e-Bangla National Cricket Stadium, Dhaka
Points: Bangladesh 2, Pakistan 0

==== New Zealand v Pakistan ====
12 December 2023
Scorecard

New Zealand; 365/4 (50 overs)	v	Pakistan; 234 (49.5 overs)

New Zealand won by 131 runs
John Davies Oval, Queenstown
Points: New Zealand 2, Pakistan 0

15 December 2023 (D/N)
Scorecard

Pakistan; 220 (50 overs)	v	New Zealand; 221/9 (48.5 overs)

New Zealand won by 1 wicket
Hagley Oval, Christchurch
Points: New Zealand 2, Pakistan 0

18 December 2023 (D/N)
Scorecard

New Zealand; 251/8 (50 overs)	v	Pakistan; 251/9 (50 overs)

Match tied (Pakistan won the Super Over)
Hagley Oval, Christchurch
Points: New Zealand 0, Pakistan 2

==== South Africa v Bangladesh ====
16 December 2023 (D/N)
Scorecard

Bangladesh; 250/3 (50 overs)	v	South Africa; 131 (36.3 overs)

Bangladesh won by 119 runs
Buffalo Park, East London
Points: South Africa 0, Bangladesh 2

20 December 2023 (D/N)
Scorecard

Bangladesh; 222/4 (50 overs)	v	South Africa; 223/2 (45.1 overs)

South Africa won by 8 wickets
JB Marks Oval, Potchefstroom
Points: South Africa 2, Bangladesh 0

23 December 2023 (D/N)
Scorecard

South Africa; 316/4 (50 overs)	v	Bangladesh; 100 (31.1 overs)

South Africa won by 216 runs
Willowmoore Park, Benoni
Points: South Africa 2, Bangladesh 0

==== Australia v South Africa ====
3 February 2024 (D/N)
Scorecard

South Africa; 105 (31.3 overs)	v	Australia; 2/106 (19 overs)

Australia won by 8 wickets
Adelaide Oval, Adelaide
Points: Australia 2, South Africa 0

7 February 2024 (D/N)
Scorecard

South Africa; 6/229 (45 overs)	v	Australia; 149 (29.3 overs)

South Africa won by 84 runs (DLS method)
North Sydney Oval, Sydney
Points: Australia 0, South Africa 2

10 February 2024 (D/N)
Scorecard

Australia; 9/277 (50 overs)	v	South Africa; 127 (24.3 overs)

Australia won by 110 runs (DLS method)
North Sydney Oval, Sydney
Points: Australia 2, South Africa 0

==== Bangladesh v Australia ====
21 March 2024
Scorecard

Australia; 213/7 (50 overs)	v	Bangladesh; 95 (36 overs)

Australia won by 118 runs
Sher-e-Bangla National Cricket Stadium, Mirpur
Points: Bangladesh 0, Australia 2

24 March 2024
Scorecard

Bangladesh; 97 (44.1 overs)	v	Australia; 98/4 (23.5 overs)

Australia won by 6 wickets
Sher-e-Bangla National Cricket Stadium, Mirpur
Points: Bangladesh 0, Australia 2

27 March 2024
Scorecard

Bangladesh; 89 (26.2 overs)	v	Australia; 93/2 (18.3 overs)

Australia won by 8 wickets
Sher-e-Bangla National Cricket Stadium, Mirpur
Points: Bangladesh 0, Australia 2

==== New Zealand v England ====
1 April 2024
Scorecard

New Zealand; 207 (48.2 overs)	v	England; 209/6 (41.2 overs)

England won by 4 wickets
Basin Reserve, Wellington
Points: New Zealand 0, England 2

4 April 2024
Scorecard

England; 252 (49 overs)	v	New Zealand; 196 (45 overs)

England won by 56 runs
Seddon Park, Hamilton
Points: New Zealand 0, England 2

7 April 2024
Scorecard

England; 194 (46.3 overs)	v	New Zealand; 195/3 (39 overs)

New Zealand won by 7 wickets
Seddon Park, Hamilton
Points: New Zealand 2, England 0

==== South Africa v Sri Lanka ====
9 April 2024 (D/N)
Scorecard

South Africa; 270/6 (50 overs)	v	Sri Lanka; 23/0 (6.5 overs)

No result
Buffalo Park, East London
Points: South Africa 1, Sri Lanka 1

13 April 2024 (D/N)
Scorecard

Sri Lanka; 229 (49.5 overs)	v	South Africa; 230/3 (47.4 overs)

South Africa won by 7 wickets
Diamond Oval, Kimberley
Points: South Africa 2, Sri Lanka 0

17 April 2024 (D/N)
Scorecard

South Africa; 301/5 (50 overs)	v	Sri Lanka; 305/4 (44.3 overs)

Sri Lanka won by 6 wickets
JB Marks Oval, Potchefstroom
Points: South Africa 0, Sri Lanka 2

=== 2024 ===
==== Pakistan v West Indies ====
18 April 2024
Scorecard

West Indies; 269/8 (50 overs)	v	Pakistan; 156 (35.5 overs)

West Indies won by 113 runs
National Stadium, Karachi
Points: Pakistan 0, West Indies 2

21 April 2024
Scorecard

Pakistan; 223 (48.5 overs)	v	West Indies; 225/8 (50 overs)

West Indies won by 2 wickets
National Stadium, Karachi
Points: Pakistan 0, West Indies 2

23 April 2024 (D/N)
Scorecard

West Indies; 278/6 (50 overs)	v	Pakistan; 190 (47.5 overs)

West Indies won by 88 runs
National Stadium, Karachi
Points: Pakistan 0, West Indies 2

==== England v Pakistan ====
23 May 2024 (D/N)
Scorecard

England; 243/9 (50 overs)	v	Pakistan; 206/9 (50 overs)

England won by 37 runs
County Cricket Ground, Derby
Points: England 2, Pakistan 0

26 May 2024
Scorecard

Pakistan; 29/0 (6.5 overs)	v	England

No result
County Ground, Taunton
Points: England 1, Pakistan 1

29 May 2024 (D/N)
Scorecard

England; 302/5 (50 overs)	v	Pakistan; 124 (29.1 overs)

England won by 178 runs
County Ground, Chelmsford
Points: England 2, Pakistan 0

==== Sri Lanka v West Indies ====
15 June 2024
Scorecard

West Indies; 195 (47.1 overs)	v	Sri Lanka; 198/4 (34.1 overs)

Sri Lanka won by 6 wickets
Galle International Stadium, Galle
Points: Sri Lanka 2, West Indies 0

18 June 2024
Scorecard

West Indies; 92 (31 overs)	v	Sri Lanka; 93/5 (21.2 overs)

Sri Lanka won by 5 wickets
Galle International Stadium, Galle
Points: Sri Lanka 2, West Indies 0

21 June 2024
Scorecard

Sri Lanka; 275/6 (50 overs)	v	West Indies; 115 (34.5 overs)

Sri Lanka won by 160 runs
Galle International Stadium, Galle
Points: Sri Lanka 2, West Indies 0

==== India v South Africa ====
16 June 2024 (D/N)
Scorecard

India; 265/8 (50 overs)	v	South Africa; 122 (37.4 overs)

India won by 143 runs
M. Chinnaswamy Stadium, Bangalore
Points: India 2, South Africa 0

19 June 2024 (D/N)
Scorecard

India; 325/3 (50 overs)	v	South Africa; 321/6 (50 overs)

India won by 4 runs
M. Chinnaswamy Stadium, Bangalore
Points: India 2, South Africa 0

23 June 2024 (D/N)
Scorecard

South Africa; 215/8 (50 overs)	v	India; 220/4 (40.4 overs)

India won by 6 wickets
M. Chinnaswamy Stadium, Bangalore
Points: India 2, South Africa 0

==== Ireland v Sri Lanka ====
16 August 2024
Scorecard

Sri Lanka; 260/8 (50 overs)	v	Ireland; 261/7 (49.2 overs)

Ireland won by 3 wickets
Stormont, Belfast
Points: Ireland 2, Sri Lanka 0

18 August 2024
Scorecard

Ireland; 255/5 (50 overs)	v	Sri Lanka; 240 (48 overs)

Ireland won by 15 runs
Stormont, Belfast
Points: Ireland 2, Sri Lanka 0

20 August 2024
Scorecard

Ireland; 122 (46.3 overs)	v	Sri Lanka; 123/2 (23.1 overs)

Sri Lanka won by 8 wickets
Stormont, Belfast
Points: Ireland 0, Sri Lanka 2

==== Ireland v England ====
7 September 2024
Scorecard

Ireland; 210 (46.5 overs)	v	England; 211/6 (34.5 overs)

England won by 4 wickets
Stormont, Belfast
Points: Ireland 0, England 2

9 September 2024
Scorecard

England; 320/8 (50 overs)	v	Ireland; 45 (16.5 overs)

England won by 275 runs
Stormont, Belfast
Points: Ireland 0, England 2

11 September 2024
Scorecard

England; 153 (20.5 overs)	v	Ireland; 155/7 (22 overs)

Ireland won by 3 wickets (DLS method)
Stormont, Belfast
Points: Ireland 2, England 0

=== 2024–25 ===
==== India v New Zealand ====
24 October 2024 (D/N)
Scorecard

India; 227 (44.3 overs)	v	New Zealand; 168 (40.4 overs)

India won by 59 runs
Narendra Modi Stadium, Ahmedabad
Points: India 2, New Zealand 0

27 October 2024 (D/N)
Scorecard

New Zealand; 259/9 (50 overs)	v	India; 183 (47.1 overs)

New Zealand won by 76 runs
Narendra Modi Stadium, Ahmedabad
Points: India 0, New Zealand 2

29 October 2024 (D/N)
Scorecard

New Zealand; 232 (49.5 overs)	v	India; 236/4 (44.2 overs)

India won by 6 wickets
Narendra Modi Stadium, Ahmedabad
Points: India 2, New Zealand 0

==== Bangladesh v Ireland ====
27 November 2024
Scorecard

Bangladesh; 252/4 (50 overs)	v	Ireland; 98 (28.5 overs)

Bangladesh won by 154 runs
Sher-e-Bangla National Cricket Stadium, Dhaka
Points: Bangladesh 2, Ireland 0

30 November 2024
Scorecard

Ireland; 193/5 (50 overs)	v	Bangladesh; 197/5 (43.5 overs)

Bangladesh won by 5 wickets
Sher-e-Bangla National Cricket Stadium, Dhaka
Points: Bangladesh 2, Ireland 0

2 December 2024
Scorecard

Ireland; 185 (50 overs)	v	Bangladesh; 186/3 (37.3 overs)

Bangladesh won by 7 wickets
Sher-e-Bangla National Cricket Stadium, Dhaka
Points: Bangladesh 2, Ireland 0

==== South Africa v England ====
4 December 2024 (D/N)
Scorecard

England; 186 (38.4 overs)	v	South Africa; 189/4 (38.2 overs)

South Africa won by 6 wickets
De Beers Diamond Oval, Kimberley
Points: South Africa 2, England 0

8 December 2024
Scorecard

South Africa; 135 (31.3 overs)	v	England; 137/4 (24 overs)

England won by 6 wickets
Kingsmead Cricket Ground, Durban
Points: South Africa 0, England 2

11 December 2024 (D/N)
Scorecard

South Africa; 233/8 (50 overs)	v	England; 153/4 (19 overs)

England won by 6 wickets (DLS method)
JB Marks Oval, Potchefstroom
Points: South Africa 0, England 2

==== Australia v India ====
5 December 2024 (D/N)
Scorecard

India; 100 (34.2 overs)	v	Australia; 5/102 (16.2 overs)

Australia won by 5 wickets
Allan Border Field, Brisbane
Points: Australia 2, India 0

8 December 2024
Scorecard

Australia; 8/371 (50 overs)	v	India; 249 (44.5 overs)

Australia won by 122 runs
Allan Border Field, Brisbane
Points: Australia 2, India 0

11 December 2024 (D/N)
Scorecard

Australia; 6/298 (50 overs)	v	India; 215 (45.1 overs)

Australia won by 83 runs
WACA Ground, Perth
Points: Australia 2, India 0

==== New Zealand v Australia ====
19 December 2024
Scorecard

New Zealand	v	Australia

Match abandoned
Basin Reserve, Wellington
Points: New Zealand 1, Australia 1

21 December 2024
Scorecard

Australia; 291/7 (50 overs)	v	New Zealand; 122/5 (30.1 overs)

Australia won by 65 runs (DLS method)
Basin Reserve, Wellington
Points: New Zealand 0, Australia 2

23 December 2024
Scorecard

Australia; 290 (49 overs)	v	New Zealand; 215 (43.3 overs)

Australia won by 75 runs
Basin Reserve, Wellington
Points: New Zealand 0, Australia 2

==== India v West Indies ====
22 December 2024 (D/N)
Scorecard

India; 314/9 (50 overs)	v	West Indies; 103 (26.2 overs)

India won by 211 runs
Kotambi Stadium, Vadodara
Points: India 2, West Indies 0

24 December 2024 (D/N)
Scorecard

India; 358/5 (50 overs)	v	West Indies; 243 (46.2 overs)

India won by 115 runs
Kotambi Stadium, Vadodara
Points: India 2, West Indies 0

27 December 2024
Scorecard

West Indies; 162 (38.5 overs)	v	India; 167/5 (28.2 overs)

India won by 5 wickets
Kotambi Stadium, Vadodara
Points: India 2, West Indies 0

==== India v Ireland ====
10 January 2025
Scorecard

Ireland; 238/7 (50 overs)	v	India; 241/4 (34.3 overs)

India won by 6 wickets
Niranjan Shah Stadium, Rajkot
Points: India 2, Ireland 0

12 January 2025
Scorecard

India; 370/5 (50 overs)	v	Ireland; 254/7 (50 overs)

India won by 116 runs
Niranjan Shah Stadium, Rajkot
Points: India 2, Ireland 0

15 January 2025
Scorecard

India; 435/5 (50 overs)	v	Ireland; 131 (31.4 overs)

India won by 304 runs
Niranjan Shah Stadium, Rajkot
Points: India 2, Ireland 0

==== West Indies v Bangladesh ====
19 January 2025 (D/N)
Scorecard

Bangladesh; 198/9 (50 overs)	v	West Indies; 202/1 (31.4 overs)

West Indies won by 9 wickets
Warner Park Sporting Complex, Basseterre
Points: West Indies 2, Bangladesh 0

21 January 2025 (D/N)
Scorecard

Bangladesh; 184 (48.5 overs)	v	West Indies; 124 (35 overs)

Bangladesh won by 60 runs
Warner Park Sporting Complex, Basseterre
Points: Bangladesh 2, West Indies 0

24 January 2025 (D/N)
Scorecard

Bangladesh; 118 (43.5 overs)	v	West Indies; 122/2 (27.3 overs)

West Indies won by 8 wickets
Warner Park Sporting Complex, Basseterre
Points: West Indies 2, Bangladesh 0

== Statistics ==
=== Most runs ===
Player	Team	Mat	Inns	Runs	Ave
Smriti Mandhana	India	24	24	1358	59.04
Laura Wolvaardt	South Africa	24	24	1234	64.94
Chamari Athapaththu	Sri Lanka	23	23	1088	57.26
Sidra Ameen	Pakistan	24	24	967	48.35
Hayley Matthews	West Indies	21	20	918	51.00
Last updated: 24 January 2025 | Source:ESPNCricinfo

=== Highest individual score ===
Batsman	Runs	Balls	4s	6s	Opposition	Ground	Match date
(Sri Lanka) Chamari Athapaththu	195*	139	26	5	South Africa	Potchefstroom	12 June 2025
(South Africa) Laura Wolvaardt	184*	147	23	4	Sri Lanka	Potchefstroom	12 June 2025
(Pakistan) Sidra Ameen	176*	151	20	1	Ireland	Lahore	4 November 2022
(India) Pratika Rawal	154	129	20	1	Ireland	Rajkot	15 January 2025
(England) Tammy Beaumont	150*	139	16	1	Ireland	Belfast	9 September 2024
Last updated: 24 January 2025 | Source:ESPNCricinfo

=== Most wickets ===
Player	Team	Mat	Inns	Wkts	Ave
Deepti Sharma	India	24	23	42	18.97
Ashleigh Gardner	Australia	22	21	40	13.92
Charlie Dean	England	18	17	33	19.93
Kate Cross	England	22	22	33	20.15
Nahida Akter	Bangladesh	23	22	32	22.53
Last updated: 24 January 2025 | Source:ESPNCricinfo

=== Best bowling figures in an innings ===
BBI	Bowler	Overs	Mdns	Econ	Opposition	Ground	Match date
6/30	(England) Kate Cross	9.5	0	3.05	Ireland	Belfast	7 September 2024
6/31	(India) Deepti Sharma	10.0	3	3.10	West Indies	Vadodara	27 December 2024
5/8	(South Africa) Shabnim Ismail	8.5	4	0.90	Ireland	Dublin	17 June 2022
5/19	(Ireland) Aimee Maguire	3.5	0	4.95	England	Belfast	11 September 2024
5/19	(Australia) Megan Schutt	6.2	1	3.00	India	Brisbane	5 December 2024
Last updated: 24 January 2025 | Source:ESPNCricinfo
