= New Zealand women's cricket team in the West Indies in 2022–23 =

International cricket tour

	West Indies	New Zealand
- Dates: 19 September – 6 October 2022
Captains	Hayley Matthews	Sophie Devine

One Day International series
- Results: New Zealand won the 3-match series 2–1
Most runs	Hayley Matthews (88)	Amelia Kerr (98)
Most wickets	Karishma Ramharack (5); Hayley Matthews (5)	Jess Kerr (5)
- Player of the series: Amelia Kerr (NZ)

Twenty20 International series
- Results: New Zealand won the 5-match series 4–1
Most runs	Hayley Matthews (119)	Maddy Green (106)
Most wickets	Hayley Matthews (6); Afy Fletcher (6)	Fran Jonas (7)
- Player of the series: Amelia Kerr (NZ)

The New Zealand women's cricket team toured the West Indies in September and October 2022 to play three Women's One Day Internationals (WODIs) and five Women's Twenty20 Internationals (WT20Is). All the matches were played at the Sir Vivian Richards Stadium in Antigua. The WODIs formed part of the 2022–2025 ICC Women's Championship.

The first ODI was scheduled to be played on 16 September, but was postponed to 19 September and the rest of the matches were rescheduled due to the impact of Tropical Storm Fiona.

== Squads ==
West Indies		New Zealand
WODIs	WT20Is	WODIs and WT20Is
Hayley Matthews (c); Aaliyah Alleyne; Stafanie Taylor; Shemaine Campbelle (wk); Shamilia Connell; Afy Fletcher; Cherry-Ann Fraser; Shabika Gajnabi; Jannillea Glasgow; Sheneta Grimmond; Chinelle Henry; Natasha McLean (wk); Chedean Nation; Kyshona Knight; Karishma Ramharack; Shakera Selman; Rashada Williams (wk)	Hayley Matthews (c); Shakera Selman (vc); Aaliyah Alleyne; Shamilia Connell; Afy Fletcher; Cherry-Ann Fraser; Shabika Gajnabi; Sheneta Grimmond; Chinelle Henry; Natasha McLean (wk); Chedean Nation; Kyshona Knight; Karishma Ramharack; Rashada Williams (wk)	Sophie Devine (c); Suzie Bates; Eden Carson; Lauren Down; Izzy Gaze (wk); Maddy Green; Brooke Halliday; Hayley Jensen; Fran Jonas; Amelia Kerr; Jess Kerr; Molly Penfold; Georgia Plimmer; Hannah Rowe; Lea Tahuhu

Shamilia Connell was added to West Indies' squad before the 4th T20I.

== WODI series ==
=== 1st WODI ===
19 September 2022
09:30
Scorecard

West Indies; 168/7 (35 overs)	v	New Zealand; 159/5 (33 overs)
Chinelle Henry 44 (34); Fran Jonas 2/22 (7 overs)		Suzie Bates 51 (65); Hayley Matthews 3/28 (7 overs)

New Zealand won by 5 runs (DLS method)
Sir Vivian Richards Stadium, North Sound
Umpires: Jacqueline Williams (WI) and Joel Wilson (WI)
Player of the match: Suzie Bates (NZ)

- New Zealand won the toss and elected to field.
- The match was reduced to 35 overs per side due to rain. Bad light stopped play after 33 overs of the New Zealand innings.
- Izzy Gaze (NZ) made her WODI debut.
- Women's Championship points: New Zealand 2, West Indies 0.

=== 2nd WODI ===
22 September 2022
09:30
Scorecard

West Indies; 169/9 (50 overs)	v	New Zealand; 171/8 (40.1 overs)
Hayley Matthews 46 (82); Eden Carson 3/31 (8 overs)		Maddy Green 48 (78); Karishma Ramharack 3/22 (6 overs)

New Zealand won by 2 wickets
Sir Vivian Richards Stadium, North Sound
Umpires: Danesh Ramdhanie (WI) and Joel Wilson (WI)
Player of the match: Maddy Green (NZ)

- West Indies won the toss and elected to bat.
- Eden Carson (NZ) made her WODI debut.
- Women's Championship points: New Zealand 2, West Indies 0.

=== 3rd WODI ===
25 September 2022
09:30
Scorecard

New Zealand; 168 (48.1 overs)	v	West Indies; 169/6 (43.4 overs)
Lauren Down 53 (78); Hayley Matthews 2/23 (10 overs)		Stafanie Taylor 51* (89); Jess Kerr 3/29 (10 overs)

West Indies won by 4 wickets
Sir Vivian Richards Stadium, North Sound
Umpires: Carl Tuckett (WI) and Jacqueline Williams (WI)
Player of the match: Stafanie Taylor (WI)

- New Zealand won the toss and elected to bat.
- Georgia Plimmer (NZ) made her WODI debut.
- Women's Championship points: West Indies 2, New Zealand 0.

== WT20I series ==
=== 1st WT20I ===
28 September 2022
13:30
Scorecard

West Indies; 115 (20 overs)	v	New Zealand; 114/9 (20 overs)
Aaliyah Alleyne 49 (37); Amelia Kerr 3/16 (4 overs)		Hannah Rowe 27* (21); Chinelle Henry 3/26 (4 overs)

West Indies won by 1 run
Sir Vivian Richards Stadium, North Sound
Umpires: Shannon Crawford (WI) and Carl Tuckett (WI)
Player of the match: Chinelle Henry (WI)

- New Zealand won the toss and elected to field.
- Rashada Williams (WI) made her WT20I debut.

=== 2nd WT20I ===
1 October 2022
10:00
Scorecard

West Indies; 107/5 (20 overs)	v	New Zealand; 108/4 (19.5 overs)
Kyshona Knight 42 (48); Hayley Jensen 3/24 (4 overs)		Suzie Bates 54 (61); Cherry-Ann Fraser 1/13 (2.5 overs)

New Zealand won by 6 wickets
Sir Vivian Richards Stadium, North Sound
Umpires: Shannon Crawford (WI) and Jacqueline Williams (WI)
Player of the match: Suzie Bates (NZ)

- New Zealand won the toss and elected to field.

=== 3rd WT20I ===
2 October 2022
13:30
Scorecard

West Indies; 93/9 (20 overs)	v	New Zealand; 94/5 (18.4 overs)
Hayley Matthews 30 (28); Fran Jonas 3/16 (4 overs)		Maddy Green 49* (45); Hayley Matthews 4/12 (4 overs)

New Zealand won by 5 wickets
Sir Vivian Richards Stadium, North Sound
Umpires: Danesh Ramdhanie (WI) and Carl Tuckett (WI)
Player of the match: Maddy Green (NZ)

- New Zealand won the toss and elected to field.

=== 4th WT20I ===
5 October 2022
10:00
Scorecard

New Zealand; 111/4 (20 overs)	v	West Indies; 111/9 (20 overs)
Amelia Kerr 49* (47); Afy Fletcher 2/16 (4 overs)		Chedean Nation 23 (28); Sophie Devine 3/29 (4 overs)

Match tied (New Zealand won the Super Over)
Sir Vivian Richards Stadium, North Sound
Umpires: Danesh Ramdhanie (WI) and Jacqueline Williams (WI)
Player of the match: Amelia Kerr (NZ)

- West Indies won the toss and elected to field.
- Super Over: West Indies 15/0 (1 over), New Zealand 18/0 (1 over).

=== 5th WT20I ===
6 October 2022
13:30
Scorecard

West Indies; 101/8 (20 overs)	v	New Zealand; 102/5 (20 overs)
Hayley Matthews 56 (54); Suzie Bates 3/10 (3 overs)		Maddy Green 32* (29); Shabika Gajnabi 1/8 (1 over)

New Zealand won by 5 wickets
Sir Vivian Richards Stadium, North Sound
Umpires: Shannon Crawford (WI) and Carl Tuckett (WI)
Player of the match: Maddy Green (NZ)

- New Zealand won the toss and elected to field.
- Molly Penfold (NZ) made her WT20I debut.
