= Ireland women's cricket team in the West Indies in 2023 =

International cricket tour

	West Indies	Ireland
- Dates: 26 June – 8 July 2023
Captains	Hayley Matthews	Laura Delany

One Day International series
- Results: West Indies won the 3-match series 2–0
Most runs	Stafanie Taylor (134)	Gaby Lewis (188)
Most wickets	Hayley Matthews (5); Afy Fletcher (5)	Cara Murray (3)
- Player of the series: Hayley Matthews (WI)

Twenty20 International series
- Results: West Indies won the 3-match series 3–0
Most runs	Hayley Matthews (135)	Amy Hunter (92)
Most wickets	Hayley Matthews (8)	Arlene Kelly (4)
- Player of the series: Hayley Matthews (WI)

The Ireland women's cricket team toured the West Indies in June and July 2023 to play three One Day International (ODI) and three Twenty20 International (T20I) matches. The ODI series formed part of the 2022–2025 ICC Women's Championship. In March 2023, Cricket Ireland (CI) announced their summer schedule, including the dates of this tour. Cricket West Indies (CWI) confirmed the schedule of the tour in June 2023.

West Indies won the ODI series 2–0, after the second match ended in a no result due to rain. West Indies also won the T20I series 3–0, and captain Hayley Matthews was named as the player of the match in all three T20Is.

== Squads ==
West Indies		Ireland
ODIs	T20Is	ODIs and T20Is
Hayley Matthews (c); Shemaine Campbelle (vc, wk); Aaliyah Alleyne; Shamilia Connell; Afy Fletcher; Cherry-Ann Fraser; Shabika Gajnabi; Chinelle Henry; Zaida James; Djenaba Joseph; Qiana Joseph; Ashmini Munisar; Karishma Ramharack; Shunelle Sawh (wk); Stafanie Taylor; Rashada Williams (wk)	Hayley Matthews (c); Shemaine Campbelle (vc, wk); Aaliyah Alleyne; Shamilia Connell; Afy Fletcher; Cherry-Ann Fraser; Shabika Gajnabi; Chinelle Henry; Zaida James; Djenaba Joseph; Qiana Joseph; Ashmini Munisar; Stafanie Taylor; Rashada Williams (wk)	Laura Delany (c); Ava Canning; Georgina Dempsey; Amy Hunter (wk); Arlene Kelly; Gaby Lewis; Louise Little; Sophie MacMahon; Aimee Maguire; Cara Murray; Leah Paul; Orla Prendergast; Eimear Richardson; Rebecca Stokell; Mary Waldron (wk)

== ODI series ==
=== 1st ODI ===
26 June 2023
10:00
Scorecard

West Indies; 297/6 (50 overs)	v	Ireland; 239/9 (50 overs)
Hayley Matthews 109 (106); Cara Murray 3/60 (10 overs)		Gaby Lewis 83 (102); Hayley Matthews 3/53 (10 overs)

West Indies won by 58 runs
Daren Sammy Cricket Ground, Gros Islet
Umpires: Deighton Butler (WI) and Jacqueline Williams (WI)
Player of the match: Hayley Matthews (WI)

- West Indies won the toss and elected to bat.
- Zaida James (WI) and Ava Canning (Ire) both made their ODI debuts.
- Women's Championship points: West Indies 2, Ireland 0.

=== 2nd ODI ===
28 June 2023
10:00
Scorecard

Ireland; 36/5 (8.4 overs)	v	West Indies
Orla Prendergast 13* (19); Aaliyah Alleyne 2/4 (2 overs)

No result
Daren Sammy Cricket Ground, Gros Islet
Umpires: Jonathan Blades (WI) and Jacqueline Williams (WI)

- West Indies won the toss and elected to field.
- No further play was possible due to rain.
- Ashmini Munisar (WI) made her ODI debut.
- Women's Championship points: West Indies 1, Ireland 1.

=== 3rd ODI ===
1 July 2023
15:00 (D/N)
Scorecard

Ireland; 203 (50 overs)	v	West Indies; 204/4 (41.1 overs)
Gaby Lewis 95* (121); Afy Fletcher 3/37 (10 overs)		Stafanie Taylor 79* (105); Aimee Maguire 2/24 (5 overs)

West Indies won by 6 wickets
Daren Sammy Cricket Ground, Gros Islet
Umpires: Jonathan Blades (WI) and Deighton Butler (WI)
Player of the match: Stafanie Taylor (WI)

- Ireland won the toss and elected to bat.
- Aimee Maguire (Ire) made her ODI debut.
- Women's Championship points: West Indies 2, Ireland 0.

== T20I series ==
=== 1st T20I ===
4 July 2023
17:00 (D/N)
Scorecard

Ireland; 112/7 (20 overs)	v	West Indies; 113/8 (20 overs)
Laura Delany 34 (36); Hayley Matthews 3/22 (4 overs)		Hayley Matthews 37 (42); Arlene Kelly 3/21 (4 overs)

West Indies won by 2 wickets
Daren Sammy Cricket Ground, Gros Islet
Umpires: Deighton Butler (WI) and Jacqueline Williams (WI)
Player of the match: Hayley Matthews (WI)

- West Indies won the toss and elected to field.
- Ashmini Munisar (WI) and Aimee Maguire (Ire) both made their T20I debuts.

=== 2nd T20I ===
6 July 2023
17:00 (D/N)
Scorecard

Ireland; 113/7 (20 overs)	v	West Indies; 114/2 (16.4 overs)
Amy Hunter 33 (35); Cherry-Ann Fraser 1/16 (4 overs)		Hayley Matthews 50 (39); Laura Delany 1/12 (2.4 overs)

West Indies won by 8 wickets
Daren Sammy Cricket Ground, Gros Islet
Umpires: Jonathan Blades (WI) and Deighton Butler (WI)
Player of the match: Hayley Matthews (WI)

- Ireland won the toss and elected to bat.

=== 3rd T20I ===
8 July 2023
17:00 (D/N)
Scorecard

Ireland; 116/9 (20 overs)	v	West Indies; 117/2 (18.1 overs)
Amy Hunter 44 (35); Hayley Matthews 4/14 (4 overs)		Aaliyah Alleyne 49* (51); Georgina Dempsey 1/21 (4 overs)

West Indies won by 8 wickets
Daren Sammy Cricket Ground, Gros Islet
Umpires: Jonathan Blades (WI) and Jacqueline Williams (WI)
Player of the match: Hayley Matthews (WI)

- Ireland won the toss and elected to bat.
- Hayley Matthews (WI) got her first hat-trick in T20Is.
