= Australia women's cricket team in New Zealand in 2024–25 =

International cricket tour

- Rose Bowl series (ODIs); Trans-Tasman series (T20Is)
	New Zealand	Australia
- Dates: 19 December 2024 – 26 March 2025
Captains	Sophie Devine (ODIs); Suzie Bates (T20Is)	Alyssa Healy (ODIs); Tahlia McGrath (T20Is)

One Day International series
- Results: Australia won the 3-match series 2–0
Most runs	Maddy Green (65)	Annabel Sutherland (147)
Most wickets	Amelia Kerr (4); Rosemary Mair (4); Molly Penfold (4)	Kim Garth (3); Alana King (3); Annabel Sutherland (3)
- Player of the series: Annabel Sutherland (Aus)

Twenty20 International series
- Results: Australia won the 3-match series 3–0
Most runs	Amelia Kerr (157)	Beth Mooney (166)
Most wickets	Sophie Devine (2); Amelia Kerr (2); Lea Tahuhu (2)	Annabel Sutherland (8)
- Player of the series: Beth Mooney (Aus)

The Australia women's cricket team toured New Zealand in December 2024 to play three One Day International (ODI) matches. The ODI series formed part of the 2022–2025 ICC Women's Championship. Later they returned in March 2025 to play three Twenty20 International (T20I) matches. In July 2024, the New Zealand Cricket (NZC) confirmed the fixtures for the tour, as a part of the 2024–25 home international season.

== Squads ==
New Zealand		Australia	
ODIs	T20Is	ODIs	T20Is
Sophie Devine (c); Suzie Bates; Eden Carson; Lauren Down; Izzy Gaze (wk); Maddy Green; Brooke Halliday; Bella James (wk); Fran Jonas; Amelia Kerr; Jess Kerr; Rosemary Mair; Molly Penfold	Suzie Bates (c); Eden Carson; Sophie Devine; Maddy Green; Brooke Halliday; Polly Inglis (wk); Bella James (wk); Fran Jonas; Amelia Kerr; Jess Kerr; Rosemary Mair; Georgia Plimmer; Lea Tahuhu	Alyssa Healy (c); Tahlia McGrath (vc); Darcie Brown; Ashleigh Gardner; Kim Garth; Heather Graham; Alana King; Phoebe Litchfield; ~~Sophie Molineux~~; Beth Mooney (wk); Ellyse Perry; Megan Schutt; Annabel Sutherland; Georgia Voll; Georgia Wareham	Tahlia McGrath (c); Ashleigh Gardner (vc); Darcie Brown; Nicole Faltum (wk); Kim Garth; Grace Harris; Alana King; Charli Knott; Phoebe Litchfield; Beth Mooney (wk); Ellyse Perry; Megan Schutt; Annabel Sutherland; Georgia Voll; Georgia Wareham

On 10 December, Australia added Georgia Voll to the ODI squad. On 14 December, Sophie Molineux was ruled out of the ODI series with a knee injury, with Heather Graham named as her replacement. Alyssa Healy played as a batter in the ODI series, a knee injury prevented her from keeping wicket.

On 22 March, Ashleigh Gardner was ruled of the remainder of T20I series and was replaced by Charli Knott. On 25 March, Darcie Brown was ruled out of the third T20I due to family reasons.

== ODI series ==
=== 1st ODI ===
19 December 2024
11:00
Scorecard

New Zealand	v	Australia

Match abandoned
Basin Reserve, Wellington
Umpires: Kim Cotton (NZ) and Vrinda Rathi (Ind)

- No toss.
- No play was possible due to rain.
- Women's Championship points: New Zealand 1, Australia 1.

=== 2nd ODI ===
21 December 2024
11:00
Scorecard

Australia; 291/7 (50 overs)	v	New Zealand; 122/5 (30.1 overs)
Annabel Sutherland 105* (81); Molly Penfold 4/42 (10 overs)		Amelia Kerr 38 (55); Kim Garth 2/17 (6 overs)

Australia won by 65 runs (DLS method)
Basin Reserve, Wellington
Umpires: Cory Black (NZ) and Kim Cotton (NZ)
Player of the match: Annabel Sutherland (Aus)

- New Zealand won the toss and elected to field.
- No further play was possible due to rain.
- Bella James (NZ) made her ODI debut.
- Women's Championship points: Australia 2, New Zealand 0.

=== 3rd ODI ===
23 December 2024
11:00
Scorecard

Australia; 290 (49 overs)	v	New Zealand; 215 (43.3 overs)
Ashleigh Gardner 74 (62); Amelia Kerr 4/54 (10 overs)		Suzie Bates 53 (59); Alana King 3/34 (9 overs)

Australia won by 75 runs
Basin Reserve, Wellington
Umpires: Kim Cotton (NZ) and Vrinda Rathi (Ind)
Player of the match: Annabel Sutherland (Aus)

- Australia won the toss and elected to bat.
- Women's Championship points: Australia 2, New Zealand 0.

== T20I series ==
=== 1st T20I ===
21 March 2025
14:45
Scorecard

New Zealand; 137/2 (20 overs)	v	Australia; 138/2 (13.3 overs)
Amelia Kerr 51* (46); Darcie Brown 1/22 (4 overs)		Beth Mooney 75* (42); Lea Tahuhu 2/31 (3 overs)

Australia won by 8 wickets
Eden Park, Auckland
Umpires: Cory Black (NZ) and Kim Cotton (NZ)
Player of the match: Beth Mooney (Aus)

- New Zealand won the toss and elected to bat.

=== 2nd T20I ===
23 March 2025
14:45
Scorecard

Australia; 204/3 (20 overs)	v	New Zealand; 122 (16.1 overs)
Beth Mooney 70 (42); Amelia Kerr 1/27 (4 overs)		Amelia Kerr 40 (36); Annabel Sutherland 4/8 (2.1 overs)

Australia won by 82 runs
Bay Oval, Mount Maunganui
Umpires: Shaun Haig (NZ) and Tina Semmens (NZ)
Player of the match: Beth Mooney (Aus)

- Australia won the toss and elected to bat.

=== 3rd T20I ===
26 March 2025
14:45
Scorecard

Australia; 180/4 (20 overs)	v	New Zealand; 172/8 (20 overs)
Georgia Voll 75 (57); Suzie Bates 1/18 (2 overs)		Amelia Kerr 66 (47); Annabel Sutherland 4/35 (4 overs)

Australia won by 8 runs
Wellington Regional Stadium, Wellington
Umpires: Chris Brown (NZ) and Kim Cotton (NZ)
Player of the match: Georgia Voll (Aus)

- New Zealand won the toss and elected to field.
- Bella James (NZ) made her T20I debut.
- Megan Schutt (Aus) became the first women's player to take 150 wickets in T20Is.
