= Pakistan women's cricket team in New Zealand in 2023–24 =

International cricket tour

	New Zealand	Pakistan
- Dates: 3 – 18 December 2023
Captains	Sophie Devine (Note: Amelia Kerr captained New Zealand in the 3rd T20I.)	Nida Dar (Note: Fatima Sana captained Pakistan in the last two ODIs.)

One Day International series
- Results: New Zealand won the 3-match series 2–1
Most runs	Suzie Bates (206)	Sidra Ameen (141)
Most wickets	Sophie Devine (5); Lea Tahuhu (5); Amelia Kerr (5)	Ghulam Fatima (6)
- Player of the series: Amelia Kerr (NZ)

Twenty20 International series
- Results: Pakistan won the 3-match series 2–1
Most runs	Suzie Bates (97)	Muneeba Ali (85)
Most wickets	Amelia Kerr (3)	Fatima Sana (6)
- Player of the series: Fatima Sana (Pak)

The Pakistan women's cricket team toured New Zealand in December 2023 to play three One Day International (ODI) and three Twenty20 International (T20I) matches. The ODI series was a part of the 2022–2025 ICC Women's Championship.

Pakistan won the first two T20Is to take an unassailable lead in the series, and registered their first series victory against New Zealand in the format.

== Squads ==
New Zealand	Pakistan
Sophie Devine (Note: Ruled out of 3rd T20I due to knee injury.) (c); Kate Anderson; Suzie Bates; Bernadine Bezuidenhout (wk); Eden Carson (Note: Only named for T20Is.); Izzy Gaze (Note: Only named for ODIs, 1st & 3rd T20Is.) (wk); Maddy Green (wk); Fran Jonas; Amelia Kerr; Jess Kerr; Molly Penfold; Georgia Plimmer; Hannah Rowe; Lea Tahuhu	Nida Dar (Note: Ruled out of last two ODIs due to concussion.) (c); Muneeba Ali (wk); Najiha Alvi (wk); Sidra Ameen; Waheeda Akhtar; Diana Baig (Note: Ruled out of ODIs due to an injury.); Umm-e-Hani; Ghulam Fatima; Sadia Iqbal; Bismah Maroof; Natalia Pervaiz; Aliya Riaz; Fatima Sana; Nashra Sandhu; Sadaf Shamas; Omaima Sohail; Shawaal Zulfiqar (Note: Ruled out of and 3rd T20I & ODIs due to an injury.)

== Tour matches ==
28 November 2023
11:00
Scorecard

Pakistan; 238/13 (50 overs)	v	New Zealand XI; 181/13 (50 overs)
Najiha Alvi 38 (52); Gabby Sullivan 4/41 (6 overs)		Abigale Gerken 42 (78); Nida Dar 4/11 (4 overs)

Pakistan won by 57 runs
Bert Sutcliffe Oval, Lincoln
Umpires: Kim Cotton (NZ) and Tina Semmens (NZ)

- Toss uncontested.

30 November 2023
11:00
Scorecard

New Zealand XI; 168/7 (20 overs)	v	Pakistan; 140/8 (20 overs)
Georgia Plimmer 52 (35); Nida Dar 2/28 (3 overs)		Muneeba Ali 32 (31); Nensi Patel 3/19 (3 overs)

New Zealand XI won by 28 runs
Bert Sutcliffe Oval, Lincoln
Umpires: Kim Cotton (NZ) and Tina Semmens (NZ)

- Pakistan won the toss and elected to field.

== T20I series ==
=== 1st T20I ===
3 December 2023
13:00
Scorecard

New Zealand; 127/6 (20 overs)	v	Pakistan; 132/3 (18.2 overs)
Maddy Green 43* (28); Fatima Sana 3/18 (4 overs)		Shawaal Zulfiqar 41 (42); Sophie Devine 2/23 (3 overs)

Pakistan won by 7 wickets
University Oval, Dunedin
Umpires: Cory Black (NZ) and Kim Cotton (NZ)
Player of the match: Fatima Sana (Pak)

- New Zealand won the toss and elected to bat.
- This was the first win for Pakistan against New Zealand in women's T20Is.

=== 2nd T20I ===
5 December 2023
13:00
Scorecard

Pakistan; 137/6 (20 overs)	v	New Zealand; 127/7 (20 overs)
Muneeba Ali 35 (28); Fran Jonas 2/21 (4 overs)		Hannah Rowe 33 (24); Fatima Sana 3/22 (4 overs)

Pakistan won by 10 runs
University Oval, Dunedin
Umpires: Cory Black (NZ) and Shaun Haig (NZ)
Player of the match: Aliya Riaz (Pak)

- New Zealand won the toss and elected to field.

=== 3rd T20I ===
9 December 2023
13:00
Scorecard

Pakistan; 137/5 (20 overs)	v	New Zealand; 101/2 (15 overs)
Sidra Ameen 43 (38); Amelia Kerr 3/11 (4 overs)		Suzie Bates 51* (42); Sadia Iqbal 1/15 (4 overs)

New Zealand won by 6 runs (DLS method)
John Davies Oval, Queenstown
Umpires: Kim Cotton (NZ) and Shaun Haig (NZ)
Player of the match: Suzie Bates (NZ)

- New Zealand won the toss and elected to field.
- No further play was possible due to rain.
- Amelia Kerr captained New Zealand in T20Is for the first time.

== ODI series ==
=== 1st ODI ===
12 December 2023
11:00
Scorecard

New Zealand; 365/4 (50 overs)	v	Pakistan; 234 (49.5 overs)
Suzie Bates 108 (104); Nashra Sandhu 1/52 (10 overs)		Sidra Ameen 105 (117); Amelia Kerr 3/44 (8.5 overs)

New Zealand won by 131 runs
John Davies Oval, Queenstown
Umpires: Kim Cotton (NZ) and John Dempsey (NZ)
Player of the match: Suzie Bates (NZ)

- Pakistan won the toss and elected to field.
- Sadaf Shamas replaced Nida Dar as concussion substitute for Pakistan.
- Women's Championship points: New Zealand 2, Pakistan 0.

=== 2nd ODI ===
15 December 2023
14:00 (D/N)
Scorecard

Pakistan; 220 (50 overs)	v	New Zealand; 221/9 (48.5 overs)
Fatima Sana 90 (104); Sophie Devine 3/25 (6 overs)		Maddy Green 83 (96); Ghulam Fatima 4/47 (10 overs)

New Zealand won by 1 wicket
Hagley Oval, Christchurch
Umpires: John Dempsey (NZ) and Kannan Jagannathan (NZ)
Player of the match: Maddy Green (NZ)

- New Zealand won the toss and elected to field.
- Fatima Sana captained Pakistan in ODIs for the first time.
- Sophie Devine (NZ) took her 100th wicket in ODIs.
- Women's Championship points: New Zealand 2, Pakistan 0.

=== 3rd ODI ===
18 December 2023
14:00 (D/N)
Scorecard

New Zealand; 251/8 (50 overs)	v	Pakistan; 251/9 (50 overs)
Amelia Kerr 77 (87); Ghulam Fatima 2/59 (10 overs); Nashra Sandhu 2/59 (10 overs)		Bismah Maroof 68 (86); Lea Tahuhu 2/30 (9 overs)

Match tied
(Pakistan won the Super Over)
Hagley Oval, Christchurch
Umpires: Kim Cotton (NZ) and John Dempsey (NZ)
Player of the match: Bismah Maroof (Pak)

- New Zealand won the toss and elected to bat.
- Women's Championship points: Pakistan 2, New Zealand 0.
- This was the first win for Pakistan against New Zealand in New Zealand in women's ODIs.
