= New Zealand women's cricket team in South Africa in 2023–24 =

International cricket tour

New Zealand women's cricket team in South Africa in 2023
	South Africa	New Zealand
- Dates: 24 September – 15 October 2023
Captains	Laura Wolvaardt	Sophie Devine

One Day International series
- Results: South Africa won the 3-match series 2–1
Most runs	Laura Wolvaardt (198)	Amelia Kerr (210)
Most wickets	Masabata Klaas (6)	Lea Tahuhu (5)
- Player of the series: Laura Wolvaardt (SA)

Twenty20 International series
- Results: 5-match series drawn 1–1
Most runs	Suné Luus (81)	Amelia Kerr (134)
Most wickets	Nadine de Klerk (4); Chloe Tyron (4); Masabata Klaas (4)	Molly Penfold (3)
- Player of the series: Amelia Kerr (NZ)

The New Zealand women's cricket team toured South Africa in September and October 2023 to play three One Day International (ODI) and five Twenty20 International (T20I) matches. The ODI series formed part of the 2022–2025 ICC Women's Championship.

== Squads ==
South Africa	New Zealand	
ODIs and T20Is	ODIs	T20Is
Laura Wolvaardt (c); Anneke Bosch; Tazmin Brits; Nadine de Klerk; Mieke de Ridder (wk); Lara Goodall; Sinalo Jafta (wk); Marizanne Kapp; Ayabonga Khaka; Masabata Klaas; Suné Luus; Nonkululeko Mlaba; Tumi Sekhukhune; Nondumiso Shangase; Chloe Tryon; Delmi Tucker	Sophie Devine (c); Kate Anderson; Suzie Bates; ~~Bernadine Bezuidenhout (wk)~~; Eden Carson; Izzy Gaze (wk); Maddy Green (wk); Brooke Halliday; Fran Jonas; Amelia Kerr; Jess Kerr; Molly Penfold; Georgia Plimmer; Hannah Rowe; Lea Tahuhu	Sophie Devine (c); Kate Anderson; Bella Armstrong; Suzie Bates; ~~Bernadine Bezuidenhout (wk)~~; Eden Carson; Izzy Gaze (wk); Maddy Green (wk); Brooke Halliday; Fran Jonas; Amelia Kerr; Jess Kerr; Molly Penfold; Georgia Plimmer; Hannah Rowe; Lea Tahuhu

Before the start of the series, New Zealand's Bernadine Bezuidenhout was ruled out of the tour after getting diagnosed with pericarditis and was replaced in New Zealand's T20I squad by Izzy Gaze.

== Tour match ==
21 September 2023
10:00
Scorecard

New Zealand; 345/7 (50 overs)	v	South Africa XI; 113 (26.3 overs)
Brooke Halliday 87* (74); Miane Smit 2/36 (6 overs)		Miane Smit 34 (42); Amelia Kerr 2/7 (3 overs)

New Zealand won by 232 runs
Willowmoore Park, Benoni
Umpires: Siphelele Gasa (SA) and Kerrin Klaaste (SA)

- South Africa XI won the toss and elected to field.

== ODI series ==
=== 1st ODI ===
24 September 2023
10:00
Scorecard

New Zealand; 235/8 (50 overs)	v	South Africa; 236/6 (47.1 overs)
Brooke Halliday 76 (92); Masabata Klaas 3/60 (9 overs)		Chloe Tryon 71 (58); Hannah Rowe 2/26 (6 overs)

South Africa won by 4 wickets
JB Marks Oval, Potchefstroom
Umpires: Lauren Agenbag (SA) and Siphelele Gasa (SA)
Player of the match: Nadine de Klerk (SA)

- South Africa won the toss and elected to field.
- Women's Championship points: South Africa 2, New Zealand 0.

=== 2nd ODI ===
28 September 2023
09:30
Scorecard

New Zealand; 253 (49.5 overs)	v	South Africa; 257/3 (45.2 overs)
Amelia Kerr 88 (110); Nonkululeko Mlaba 3/41 (10 overs)		Laura Wolvaardt 124* (141); Lea Tahuhu 2/40 (7.2 overs)

South Africa won by 7 wickets
City Oval, Pietermaritzburg
Umpires: Arno Jacobs (SA) and Kerrin Klaaste (SA)
Player of the match: Laura Wolvaardt (SA)

- South Africa won the toss and elected to field.
- Women's Championship points: South Africa 2, New Zealand 0.

=== 3rd ODI ===
1 October 2023
09:30
Scorecard

South Africa; 209 (44.3 overs)	v	New Zealand; 210/4 (43.2 overs)
Marizanne Kapp 72 (73); Sophie Devine 3/33 (9 overs)		Amelia Kerr 100*(117); Nonkululeko Mlaba 2/41 (9 overs)

New Zealand won by 6 wickets
Kingsmead Cricket Ground, Durban
Umpires: Lauren Agenbag (SA) and Arno Jacobs (SA)
Player of the match: Amelia Kerr (NZ)

- New Zealand won the toss and elected to field.
- The match was reduced to 45 overs per side due to rain.
- Women's Championship points: New Zealand 2, South Africa 0.

== T20I series ==
=== 1st T20I ===
6 October 2023
18:00 (D/N)
Scorecard

South Africa	v	New Zealand

Match abandoned
Buffalo Park, East London
Umpires: Siphelele Gasa (SA) and Kerrin Klaaste (SA)

- No toss.
- No play was possible due to rain.

=== 2nd T20I ===
8 October 2023
14:00
Scorecard

New Zealand; 111/9 (20 overs)	v	South Africa
Maddy Green 45* (36); Chloe Tryon 4/15 (4 overs)

No result
Buffalo Park, East London
Umpires: Lauren Agenbag (SA) and Arno Jacobs (SA)

- South Africa won the toss and elected to field.
- No further play was possible due to rain.
- Kate Anderson and Bella Armstrong (NZ) both made their T20I debuts.

=== 3rd T20I ===
10 October 2023
18:00 (D/N)
Scorecard

South Africa	v	New Zealand

Match abandoned
Buffalo Park, East London
Umpires: Siphelele Gasa (SA) and Kerrin Klaaste (SA)

- No toss.
- No play was possible due to rain.

=== 4th T20I ===
14 October 2023
14:00
Scorecard

South Africa; 172/4 (20 overs)	v	New Zealand; 174/2 (18.5 overs)
Laura Wolvaardt 53 (44); Jess Kerr 2/41 (4 overs)		Amelia Kerr 70* (46); Masabata Klaas 1/29 (3 overs)

New Zealand won by 8 wickets
Willowmoore Park, Benoni
Umpires: Siphelele Gasa (SA) and Arno Jacobs (SA)
Player of the match: Amelia Kerr (NZ)

- New Zealand won the toss and elected to field.

=== 5th T20I ===
15 October 2023
14:00
Scorecard

South Africa; 155/5 (20 overs)	v	New Zealand; 144/8 (20 overs)
Tazmin Brits 45 (38); Lea Tahuhu 2/20 (4 overs)		Amelia Kerr 61 (47); Nadine de Klerk 3/24 (4 overs)

South Africa won by 11 runs
Willowmoore Park, Benoni
Umpires: Kerrin Klaaste (SA) and Lauren Agenbag (SA)
Player of the match: Masabata Klaas (SA)

- New Zealand won the toss and elected to field.
