= West Indies women's cricket team in Pakistan in 2024 =

International cricket tour

	Pakistan	West Indies
- Dates: 18 April – 3 May 2024
Captains	Nida Dar	Hayley Matthews

One Day International series
- Results: West Indies won the 3-match series 3–0
Most runs	Bismah Maroof (91)	Hayley Matthews (325)
Most wickets	Nida Dar (6)	Hayley Matthews (6)
- Player of the series: Hayley Matthews (WI)

Twenty20 International series
- Results: West Indies won the 5-match series 4–1
Most runs	Sidra Ameen (159)	Hayley Matthews (205)
Most wickets	Sadia Iqbal (7)	Afy Fletcher (8)
- Player of the series: Hayley Matthews (WI)

The West Indies women's cricket team toured Pakistan in April and May 2024 to play three One Day International (ODI) and five Twenty20 International (T20I) matches. The ODI series formed part of the 2022–2025 ICC Women's Championship. In March 2024, the Pakistan Cricket Board (PCB) confirmed the fixtures for the tour as a part of the 2024 home international season.

West Indies won the first ODI by 113 runs. West Indies won the second ODI by 2 wickets and seal the series 2–0. In third ODI visitor won the game by 88 runs and clean sweep the series.

West Indies won the first T20I by 1 run. West Indies won the second T20I by 7 wickets. In third T20I West Indies won by 2 runs and seal the series 3–0. In fourth T20I, Pakistan chased down West Indies's target of 84 and won by 8 wickets. In fifth T20I, West Indies won by 8 wickets and clinch the series 4–1.

== Squads ==
Pakistan		West Indies
ODIs	T20Is	ODIs & T20Is
Nida Dar (c); Waheeda Akhtar; Muneeba Ali; Najiha Alvi (wk); Sidra Ameen; Diana Baig; Tuba Hassan; Sadia Iqbal; Bismah Maroof; Sidra Nawaz (wk); Natalia Pervaiz; Aliya Riaz; Fatima Sana; Sadaf Shamas; Nashra Sandhu; Umm-e-Hani	Nida Dar (c); Muneeba Ali (wk); Najiha Alvi (wk); Sidra Ameen; Diana Baig; Gull Feroza; Tuba Hassan; Sadia Iqbal; ~~Bismah Maroof~~; Natalia Pervaiz; Aliya Riaz; Fatima Sana; Rameen Shamim; Nashra Sandhu; Umm-e-Hani; Ayesha Zafar	Hayley Matthews (c); Shemaine Campbelle (vc, wk); Aaliyah Alleyne; Shamilia Connell; Afy Fletcher; Cherry-Ann Fraser; Jannillea Glasgow; Chinelle Henry; Zaida James; Qiana Joseph; Chedean Nation; Karishma Ramharack; Stafanie Taylor; Rashada Williams (wk); Kate Wilmott

Bismah Maroof ruled out of the T20I series due to her retirement from international cricket.

== ODI series ==
=== 1st ODI ===
18 April 2024
09:30
Scorecard

West Indies; 269/8 (50 overs)	v	Pakistan; 156 (35.5 overs)
Hayley Matthews 140* (150); Sadia Iqbal 2/38 (10 overs)		Tuba Hassan 25 (23); Hayley Matthews 3/17 (6 overs)

West Indies won by 113 runs
National Stadium, Karachi
Umpires: Nasir Hussain (Pak) and Claire Polosak (Aus)
Player of the match: Hayley Matthews (WI)

- West Indies won the toss and elected to bat.
- Women's Championship points: West Indies 2, Pakistan 0.

=== 2nd ODI ===
21 April 2024
09:30
Scorecard

Pakistan; 223 (48.5 overs)	v	West Indies; 225/8 (50 overs)
Bismah Maroof 65 (105); Chinelle Henry 3/37 (8.5 overs)		Stafanie Taylor 73 (90); Nida Dar 4/52 (9 overs)

West Indies won by 2 wickets
National Stadium, Karachi
Umpires: Abdul Muqeet (Pak) and Claire Polosak (Aus)
Player of the match: Stafanie Taylor (WI)

- Pakistan won the toss and elected to bat.
- Nida Dar (Pak) took her 100th wicket in women's ODIs.
- Women's Championship points: West Indies 2, Pakistan 0.

=== 3rd ODI ===
23 April 2024
15:30 (D/N)
Scorecard

West Indies; 278/6 (50 overs)	v	Pakistan; 190 (47.5 overs)
Hayley Matthews 141 (149); Nashra Sandhu 3/54 (10 overs)		Muneeba Ali 38 (58); Hayley Matthews 2/26 (8 overs)

West Indies won by 88 runs
National Stadium, Karachi
Umpires: Imran Javed (Pak) and Claire Polosak (Aus)
Player of the match: Hayley Matthews (WI)

- West Indies won the toss and elected to bat.
- Fatima Sana (Pak) took her 50th wicket in women's ODIs.
- Hayley Matthews (WI) took her 100th wicket in ODIs.
- Women's Championship points: West Indies 2, Pakistan 0.

== T20I series ==
=== 1st T20I ===
26 April 2024
19:30 (N)
Scorecard

West Indies; 122/9 (20 overs)	v	Pakistan; 121/8 (20 overs)
Qiana Joseph 34 (36); Fatima Sana 3/24 (4 overs)		Nida Dar 27 (24); Karishma Ramharack 4/15 (4 overs)

West Indies won by 1 run
National Stadium, Karachi
Umpires: Claire Polosak (Aus) and Tariq Rasheed (Pak)
Player of the match: Karishma Ramharack (WI)

- West Indies won the toss and elected to bat.

=== 2nd T20I ===
28 April 2024
19:30 (N)
Scorecard

Pakistan; 121/7 (20 overs)	v	West Indies; 124/3 (18.2 overs)
Muneeba Ali 55 (47); Hayley Matthews 3/25 (4 overs)		Hayley Matthews 58 (43); Diana Baig 1/22 (3 overs)

West Indies won by 7 wickets
National Stadium, Karachi
Umpires: Claire Polosak (Aus) and Tariq Rasheed (Pak)
Player of the match: Hayley Matthews (WI)

- Pakistan won the toss and elected to bat.

=== 3rd T20I ===
30 April 2024
19:30 (N)
Scorecard

West Indies; 132/5 (20 overs)	v	Pakistan; 130/8 (20 overs)
Hayley Matthews 68 (49); Fatima Sana 2/22 (4 overs)		Sidra Ameen 63 (58); Afy Fletcher 2/20 (4 overs)

West Indies won by 2 runs
National Stadium, Karachi
Umpires: Faisal Afridi (Pak) and Claire Polosak (Aus)
Player of the match: Hayley Matthews (WI)

- Pakistan won the toss and elected to field.

=== 4th T20I ===
2 May 2024
19:30 (N)
Scorecard

West Indies; 84/9 (20 overs)	v	Pakistan; 87/2 (16.3 overs)
Shemaine Campbelle 26 (20); Sadia Iqbal 3/18 (4 overs)		Ayesha Zafar 42* (48); Afy Fletcher 1/6 (2 overs)

Pakistan won by 8 wickets
National Stadium, Karachi
Umpires: Farooq Ali Khan (Pak) and Claire Polosak (Aus)
Player of the match: Sadia Iqbal (Pak)

- West Indies won the toss and elected to bat.
- Kate Wilmott (WI) made her T20I debut.

=== 5th T20I ===
3 May 2024
19:30 (N)
Scorecard

Pakistan; 134/8 (20 overs)	v	West Indies; 136/2 (18.2 overs)
Sidra Ameen 48 (52); Afy Fletcher 3/17(4 overs)		Hayley Matthews 78 (59); Rameen Shamim 1/28 (4 overs)

West Indies won by 8 wickets
National Stadium, Karachi
Umpires: Faisal Afridi (Pak) and Claire Polosak (Aus)
Player of the match: Hayley Matthews (wi)

- West Indies won the toss and elected to field.
