= Pakistan women's cricket team in England in 2024 =

International cricket tour

| | England | Pakistan |
- Dates: 11 – 29 May 2024
| Captains | Heather Knight | Nida Dar |

One Day International series
- Results: England won the 3-match series 2–0
| Most runs | Nat Sciver-Brunt (155) | Muneeba Ali (81) |
| Most wickets | Sophie Ecclestone (6) | Nida Dar (4); Umm-e-Hani (4) |
- Player of the series: Sophie Ecclestone (Eng)

Twenty20 International series
- Results: England won the 3-match series 3–0
| Most runs | Danni Wyatt (94) | Aliya Riaz (54) |
| Most wickets | Sarah Glenn (6) | Nida Dar (5) |
- Player of the series: Amy Jones (Eng)

The Pakistan women's cricket team toured England in May 2024 to play three One Day International (ODI) and three Twenty20 International (T20I) matches. The ODI series formed part of the 2022–2025 ICC Women's Championship. In July 2023, the England and Wales Cricket Board (ECB) confirmed the fixtures for the tour, as a part of England's 2024 home international season.

England won the first T20I by 53 runs. England won the second T20I by 65 runs and lead the series with 2–0. England won the third and final T20I by 34 runs and clean sweep the series.

England won the first ODI by 37 runs. The second ODI was went with no result due to rain. England won the third and final ODI by 178 runs and won the series with 2–0.

== Squads ==
| England | | Pakistan |
| ODIs | T20Is | ODIs and T20Is |
|---|---|---|
| Heather Knight (c); Tammy Beaumont; Lauren Bell; Maia Bouchier; Alice Capsey; Kate Cross; Charlie Dean; Sophie Ecclestone; Lauren Filer; Sarah Glenn; Amy Jones (wk); Nat Sciver-Brunt; Danni Wyatt | Heather Knight (c); Lauren Bell; Maia Bouchier; Alice Capsey; Charlie Dean; Sophie Ecclestone; Lauren Filer; Danielle Gibson; Sarah Glenn; Bess Heath (wk); Amy Jones (wk); Freya Kemp; Nat Sciver-Brunt; Linsey Smith; Danni Wyatt | Nida Dar (c); Waheeda Akhtar; Muneeba Ali (wk); Najiha Alvi (wk); Sidra Ameen; Diana Baig; Gull Feroza; Tuba Hassan; Sadia Iqbal; Natalia Pervaiz; Aliya Riaz; Fatima Sana; Sadaf Shamas; Rameen Shamim; Nashra Sandhu; Umm-e-Hani; Ayesha Zafar |

== Tour matches ==
=== 20-over match ===
9 May 2024
11:00
Scorecard

| ECB Development XI; 140/9 (20 overs) | v | Pakistan; 103/9 (20 overs) |
| Danni Wyatt 57 (34); Nida Dar 2/11 (2 overs) | | Muneeba Ali 31 (32); Grace Potts 4/13 (4 overs) |

ECB Women Development XI won by 37 runs
Grace Road, Leicester
Umpires: Gabi Brown (Eng) and Rose Fernando (SL)

- ECB Women Development XI won the toss and elected to bat.

=== 50-over match ===
21 May 2024
11:00
Scorecard

| Pakistan; 150 (43.2 overs) | v | ECB Development XI; 112/5 (20 overs) |
| Sadaf Shamas 30 (39); Hannah Baker 4/26 (9.2 overs) | | Emma Lamb 34 (37); Rameen Shamim 2/23 (4 overs) |

ECB Women Development XI won by 26 runs (DLS method)
County Cricket Ground, Northampton
Umpires: Grace Bambury (Eng) and Jasmine Naeem (Eng)

- Pakistan won the toss and elected to bat.
- No further play was possible due to rain.

== T20I series ==
=== 1st T20I ===
11 May 2024
14:30
Scorecard

| England; 163/6 (20 overs) | v | Pakistan; 110 (18.2 overs) |
| Heather Knight 49 (44); Waheeda Akhtar 2/20 (4 overs) | | Sadaf Shamas 35 (24); Sarah Glenn 4/12 (4 overs) |

England won by 53 runs
Edgbaston Cricket Ground, Birmingham
Umpires: Kim Cotton (NZ) and Sue Redfern (Eng)
Player of the match: Amy Jones (Eng)

- Pakistan won the toss and elected to field.
- Amy Jones (Eng) played in her 100th T20I.

=== 2nd T20I ===
17 May 2024
18:30 (N)
Scorecard

| England; 144/6 (20 overs) | v | Pakistan; 79 (15.5 overs) |
| Nat Sciver-Brunt 31 (21); Nida Dar 2/33 (4 overs) | | Aliya Riaz 19 (17); Sophie Ecclestone 3/11 (2.5 overs) |

England won by 65 runs
County Cricket Ground, Northampton
Umpires: Anna Harris (Eng) and Sue Redfern (Eng)
Player of the match: Alice Capsey (Eng)

- England won the toss and elected to bat.
- Sophie Ecclestone became the leading wicket-taker for England in women's T20Is, passing the previous record of 114 wickets set by Katherine Sciver-Brunt.

=== 3rd T20I ===
19 May 2024
13:00
Scorecard

| England; 176/10 (20 overs) | v | Pakistan; 142/4 (20 overs) |
| Danni Wyatt 87 (48); Diana Baig 3/46 (4 overs) | | Aliya Riaz 35* (27); Sophie Ecclestone 1/19 (4 overs) |

England won by 34 runs
Headingley Cricket Ground, Leeds
Umpires: Kim Cotton (NZ) and Anna Harris (Eng)
Player of the match: Danni Wyatt (Eng)

- England won the toss and elected to bat.

== ODI series ==
=== 1st ODI ===
23 May 2024
13:00 (D/N)
Scorecard

| England; 243/9 (50 overs) | v | Pakistan; 206/9 (50 overs) |
| Alice Capsey 44 (65); Nida Dar 3/56 (10 overs) | | Muneeba Ali 34 (60); Sophie Ecclestone 3/26 (10 overs) |

England won by 37 runs
County Cricket Ground, Derby
Umpires: Kim Cotton (NZ) and Sue Redfern (Eng)
Player of the match: Sophie Ecclestone (Eng)

- Pakistan won the toss and elected to field.
- Women's Championship points: England 2, Pakistan 0.

=== 2nd ODI ===
26 May 2024
11:00
Scorecard

| Pakistan; 29/0 (6.5 overs) | v | England |
| Sadaf Shamas 18* (28) |

No result
County Cricket Ground, Taunton
Umpires: Anna Harris (Eng) and Sue Redfern (Eng)

- Pakistan won the toss and elected to bat.
- No further play was possible due to rain.
- Women's Championship points: England 1, Pakistan 1.

=== 3rd ODI ===
29 May 2024
13:00 (D/N)
Scorecard

| England; 302/5 (50 overs) | v | Pakistan; 124 (29.1 overs) |
| Nat Sciver-Brunt 124* (117); Umm-e-Hani 2/47 (10 overs) | | Muneeba Ali 47 (55); Sophie Ecclestone 3/15 (4.1 overs) |

England won by 178 runs
County Cricket Ground, Chelmsford
Umpires: Kim Cotton (NZ) and Jasmine Naeem (Eng)
Player of the match: Nat Sciver-Brunt (Eng)

- England won the toss and elected to bat.
- Muneeba Ali (Pak) completed her 2000th run in international cricket.
- Sophie Ecclestone (Eng) became the fastest female cricketer, in terms of innings, to take 100 wickets in women's ODIs (63).
- Women's Championship points: England 2, Pakistan 0.
