= Kate Wilmott =

Jamaican cricketer (born 2004)

Personal information
- Full name: Kate Mariah Wilmott
- Born: 29 August 2004 (age 22)
- Batting: Right-handed
- Bowling: Right-arm medium
- Role: Bowler

International information
- National side: West Indies
- T20I debut (cap 51): 2 May 2024 v Pakistan
- Last T20I: 3 May 2024 v Pakistan

Domestic team information
- Years: Team
- 2023–present: Jamaica

Career statistics
Competition	WT20I
Matches	2
Runs scored	3
Batting average	–
100s/50s	0/0
Top score	3*
Balls bowled	18
Wickets	0
Bowling average	–
5 wickets in innings	0
10 wickets in match	0
Best bowling	–
Catches/stumpings	0/–
- Source: Cricinfo, 5 May 2024

Kate Mariah Wilmott (born 29 August 2004) is a Jamaican cricketer who plays for the Jamaica women's cricket team in the Women's Super50 Cup and the Twenty20 Blaze tournaments. She also plays for West Indies women's cricket team.

== International career ==
In March 2024, it was announced that Wilmott had been named to the West Indies squad for the series against Pakistan. She made her Twenty20 International (T20I) debut in the same series at National Stadium, Karachi in Pakistan on 2 May 2024.
