= West Indies women's cricket team in Australia in 2023–24 =

International cricket tour

	Australia	West Indies
- Dates: 1 – 15 October 2023
Captains	Alyssa Healy	Hayley Matthews (Note: Shemaine Campbelle captained the West Indies in the first WODI.)

One Day International series
- Results: Australia won the 3-match series 2–0
Most runs	Alyssa Healy (70)	Aaliyah Alleyne (67)
Most wickets	Annabel Sutherland (6); Kim Garth (6)	Karishma Ramharack (1); Shamilia Connell (1); Aaliyah Alleyne (1); Cherry-Ann Fraser (1)
- Player of the series: Kim Garth (Aus)

Twenty20 International series
- Results: Australia won the 3-match series 2–1
Most runs	Tahlia McGrath (129)	Hayley Matthews (310)
Most wickets	Darcie Brown (4); Ashleigh Gardner (4)	Hayley Matthews (5); Shamilia Connell (5)
- Player of the series: Hayley Matthews (WI)

The West Indies women's cricket team toured Australia in October 2023 to play three One Day International (ODI) and three Twenty20 International (T20I) matches. Cricket Australia (CA) announced their summer schedule on 14 May 2023, which included the dates of this tour. The ODI series formed part of the 2022–2025 ICC Women's Championship.

== Squads ==
Australia		West Indies
ODIs	T20Is	ODIs and T20Is
Alyssa Healy (c, wk); Tahlia McGrath (vc); Darcie Brown; Ashleigh Gardner; Kim Garth; Jess Jonassen; Alana King; Phoebe Litchfield; Beth Mooney (wk); Ellyse Perry; Megan Schutt; Annabel Sutherland; Georgia Wareham	Alyssa Healy (c, wk); Tahlia McGrath (vc); Darcie Brown; Ashleigh Gardner; Kim Garth; Grace Harris; Jess Jonassen; Phoebe Litchfield; Beth Mooney (wk); Ellyse Perry; Megan Schutt; Annabel Sutherland; Georgia Wareham	Hayley Matthews (c); Shemaine Campbelle (vc, wk); Aaliyah Alleyne; Shamilia Connell; Afy Fletcher; Cherry-Ann Fraser; Shabika Gajnabi; Jannillea Glasgow; Chinelle Henry; Zaida James; Djenaba Joseph; Ashmini Munisar; Karishma Ramharack; Stafanie Taylor; Rashada Williams (wk)

== Tour match ==
28 September 2023
14:00
Scorecard

New South Wales; 9/105 (20 overs)	v	West Indies; 6/106 (17.5 overs)
Sammy-Jo Johnson 28 (27); Karishma Ramharack 3/12 (3 overs)		Shemaine Campbelle 33 (34); Maitlan Brown 2/8 (2.5 overs)

West Indies won by 4 wickets
Sydney Olympic Park, Sydney
Umpires: Claire Polosak (Aus) and Eloise Sheridan (Aus)

- West Indies won the toss and chose to field.

== T20I series ==
=== 1st T20I ===
1 October 2023
12:20
Scorecard

West Indies; 3/147 (20 overs)	v	Australia; 2/149 (13.2 overs)
Hayley Matthews 99* (74); Ashleigh Gardner 1/26 (4 overs)		Tahlia McGrath 60* (32); Hayley Matthews 1/17 (2 overs)

Australia won by 8 wickets
North Sydney Oval, Sydney
Umpires: Phillip Gillespie (Aus) and Claire Polosak (Aus)
Player of the match: Hayley Matthews (WI)

- Australia won the toss and elected to field.

=== 2nd T20I ===
2 October 2023
19:05 (N)
Scorecard

Australia; 6/212 (20 overs)	v	West Indies; 3/213 (19.5 overs)
Ellyse Perry 70 (46); Hayley Matthews 3/36 (4 overs)		Hayley Matthews 132 (64); Megan Schutt 2/30 (4 overs)

West Indies won by 7 wickets
North Sydney Oval, Sydney
Umpires: Eloise Sheridan (Aus) and Ben Treloar (Aus)
Player of the match: Hayley Matthews (WI)

- West Indies won the toss and elected to field.
- This was the highest successful run chase in women's T20Is.
- Phoebe Litchfield made her fifty in 18 balls, the equal fastest in WT20Is.

=== 3rd T20I ===
5 October 2023
18:05 (N)
Scorecard

Australia; 9/190 (20 overs)	v	West Indies; 143 (19.5 overs)
Tahlia McGrath 65 (34); Shamilia Connell 3/25 (3 overs)		Hayley Matthews 79 (40); Darcie Brown 3/20 (4 overs)

Australia won by 47 runs
Allan Border Field, Brisbane
Umpires: Claire Polosak (Aus) and Eloise Sheridan (Aus)
Player of the match: Hayley Matthews (WI)

- West Indies won the toss and elected to field.

== ODI series ==
=== 1st ODI ===
8 October 2023
9:35
Scorecard

West Indies; 83 (27.3 overs)	v	Australia; 2/87 (14.5 overs)
Aaliyah Alleyne 35 (39); Kim Garth 3/8 (5.3 overs)		Alyssa Healy 38 (36); Karishma Ramharack 1/13 (3 overs)

Australia won by 8 wickets
Allan Border Field, Brisbane
Umpires: Phillip Gillespie (Aus) and Ben Treloar (Aus)
Player of the match: Alyssa Healy (Aus)

- Australia won the toss and elected to field.
- Djenaba Joseph (WI) made her ODI debut.

=== 2nd ODI ===
12 October 2023
10:05
Scorecard

West Indies; 8/107 (25.3 overs)	v	Australia
Aaliyah Alleyne 28* (41); Annabel Sutherland 3/6 (5 overs)

No result
Junction Oval, Melbourne
Umpires: Phillip Gillespie (Aus) and Claire Polosak (Aus)

- Australia won the toss and elected to field.

=== 3rd ODI ===
14 October 2023
10:05
Scorecard

West Indies; 103 (31.4 overs)	v	Australia; 2/106 (15.3 overs)
Rashada Williams 25 (71); Annabel Sutherland 3/23 (4 overs)		Alyssa Healy 32 (27); Shamilia Connell 1/15 (2 overs)

Australia won by 8 wickets
Junction Oval, Melbourne
Umpires: Eloise Sheridan (Aus) and Ben Treloar (Aus)
Player of the match: Kim Garth (Aus)

- Australia won the toss and elected to field.
