= Taj Nehar =

Bangladeshi cricketer (born 1997)

Personal information
- Born: 3 October 1997 (age 29); Patuakhali, Bangladesh
- Batting: Right-handed
- Bowling: Right-arm off break
- Role: Top order Batter

International information
- National side: Bangladesh
- T20I debut (cap 45): 3 October 2024 v Scotland
- Last T20I: 10 October 2024 v West Indies
- T20I shirt no.: 73

Domestic team information
- Years: Team
- 2017–18: Sylhet Division

Career statistics
| Competition | WLA | WT20 |
|---|---|---|
| Matches | 4 | 6 |
| Runs scored | 108 | 43 |
| Batting average | 36.00 | 14.33 |
| 100s/50s | 0/0 | 0/0 |
| Top score | 45 | 20 |
| Catches/stumpings | 0/– | 1/– |
- Source: CricketArchive, 3 October 2024

Taj Nehar (Bengali: তাজ নেহার; born 3 October 1997) is a Bangladeshi cricketer who plays for the Bangladesh women's cricket team as a top-order batter.

== Career ==
She made her List A cricket debut for Sylhet Division in 2017 against Dhaka Division and her T20 debut against Chittagong Division in 2018.

In July 2024, she was named as a standby player in Bangladesh's squad for the 2024 Women's Twenty20 Asia Cup. In September 2024, she was earned her maiden call-up for national team for the 2024 ICC Women's T20 World Cup. She made her Twenty20 International (T20I) debut on her birthday, against Scotland on 3 October 2024 in the Women's T20 World Cup. Ahead of the T20 World Cup, she also named in Bangladesh A team for the five match T20 series against Sri Lanka A.
