= Fariha Trisna =

Bangladeshi cricketer (born 2002)

Personal information
- Full name: Fariha Islam Trisna
- Born: 13 September 2002 (age 24); Panchagarh
- Batting: Right-handed
- Bowling: Left-arm medium
- Role: Bowler

International information
- National side: Bangladesh
- ODI debut (cap 30): 15 November 2021 v Zimbabwe
- Last ODI: 18 March 2022 v West Indies
- ODI shirt no.: 77
- T20I debut (cap 33): 6 October 2022 v Malaysia
- Last T20I: 29 October 2023 v Pakistan

Career statistics
| Competition | WODI | WT20I |
|---|---|---|
| Matches | 5 | 3 |
| Runs scored | 0 | – |
| Batting average | 0.00 | – |
| 100s/50s | 0/0 | –/– |
| Top score | 0 | – |
| Balls bowled | 158 | 60 |
| Wickets | 5 | 4 |
| Bowling average | 22.00 | 14.00 |
| 5 wickets in innings | 0 | 0 |
| 10 wickets in match | 0 | 0 |
| Best bowling | 3/35 | 3/12 |
| Catches/stumpings | 0/– | 0/– |
- Source: Cricinfo, 14 December 2022

Fariha Islam Trisna (Bengali: ফারিহা ইসলাম তৃষ্ণা; born 13 September 2002) is a Bangladeshi cricketer who plays for the Bangladesh women's national cricket team as a left-arm medium bowler.

== Career ==
In November 2021, Trisna was named in Bangladesh's Women's One Day International (WODI) squads for their series against Zimbabwe, and for the 2021 Women's Cricket World Cup Qualifier tournament, also in Zimbabwe. She made her WODI debut on 15 November 2021, against Zimbabwe.

In January 2022, she was named in Bangladesh's team both for the 2022 Commonwealth Games Cricket Qualifier tournament in Malaysia, and for the 2022 Women's Cricket World Cup in New Zealand.

Trisna was part of the Bangladesh squad for the 2025 Women's Cricket World Cup Qualifier in Pakistan in April 2025.
