= Sarah Forbes (cricketer) =

Irish cricketer (born 2002)

Personal information
- Born: 16 August 2002 (age 24); Dublin, Ireland
- Batting: Right-handed
- Bowling: Right-arm off spin
- Role: Batter

International information
- National side: Ireland (2022–present)
- ODI debut (cap 93): 11 June 2022 v South Africa
- Last ODI: 15 April 2025 v Thailand
- ODI shirt no.: 68
- T20I debut (cap 52): 8 June 2022 v South Africa
- Last T20I: 7 December 2024 v Bangladesh
- T20I shirt no.: 68

Domestic team information
- Years: Team
- 2018–2019: Scorchers
- 2020–2021; 2023–present: Dragons
- 2022: Typhoons

Career statistics
Competition	WODI	WT20I
Matches	15	5
Runs scored	217	14
Batting average	14.46	4.66
100s/50s	0/0	0/0
Top score	41	4*
Balls bowled	12	0
Wickets	0	–
Bowling average	–	–
5 wickets in innings	–	–
10 wickets in match	–	–
Best bowling	–	–
Catches/stumpings	3/–	0/–
- Source: Cricinfo, 17 April 2025

Sarah Forbes (born 16 August 2002) is an Irish cricketer who plays for Ireland as a right-handed batter. She played for Scorchers, Typhoons and Dragons in domestic cricket.

== International career ==
She was earned her maiden call-up for the Ireland's squad for their series against South Africa in June 2022. She made her Women's Twenty20 International (WT20I) debut against South Africa on 8 June 2022. And made her Women's One Day International (WODI) debut on 11 June 2022, also in the series against South Africa.

In October 2023, she was named in national squad for the series against Scotland. In August 2024, she was selected as a replacement of Una Raymond-Hoey in T20I squad against Sri Lanka.

Forbes was part of the Ireland squad for the 2025 Women's Cricket World Cup Qualifier in Pakistan in April 2025.
