= Aimee Maguire =

Irish cricketer (born 2006)

Personal information
- Full name: Aimee Kate Maguire
- Born: 9 September 2006 (age 20); Dublin, Ireland
- Batting: Right-handed
- Bowling: Slow left-arm orthodox
- Role: Bowler
- Relatives: Jane Maguire (sister)

International information
- National side: Ireland
- ODI debut (cap 97): 1 July 2023 v West Indies
- Last ODI: 15 July 2026 v West Indies
- ODI shirt no.: 9
- T20I debut (cap 53): 4 July 2023 v West Indies
- Last T20I: 27 June 2026 v West Indies
- T20I shirt no.: 9

Domestic team information
- Years: Team
- 2022–present: Scorchers

Career statistics
Competition	WODI	WT20I
Matches	16	24
Runs scored	43	10
Batting average	7.16	3.33
100s/50s	-/-	-/-
Top score	13	3*
Balls bowled	713	449
Wickets	23	24
Bowling average	31.56	24.12
5 wickets in innings	1	0
10 wickets in match	0	0
Best bowling	5/19	3/30
Catches/stumpings	5/–	5/–
- Source: Cricinfo, 16 August 2026

Aimee Kate Maguire (born 9 September 2006) is an Irish cricketer who plays for Ireland as a left-arm spinner. She played for Scorchers in domestic cricket.

== Career ==
In December 2022, Maguire was selected for the Ireland under-19 team at the 2023 Under-19 Women's T20 World Cup in South Africa. She played five matches in the tournament and took 3 wickets at an average of 26.66.

In June 2023, Maguire earned her maiden call-up for national team for the series against West Indies. She made her WODI debut on 1 July and made her WT20I debut on 4 July 2023 in same series against West Indies. In August 2023, she was selected for the series against Netherlands but after 1st T20I she was ruled out of the series due to injury and was replaced by Sophie MacMahon. In October 2023, she was named in the T20I squad for the series against Scotland.

She took her first five-wicket haul (5/19) in ODIs against England in the 3rd ODI, on 11 September 2024.

=== Suspect bowling action ===
In January 2025, after the first ODI against India, she was reported for suspect bowling action. Maguire underwent a bowling assessment at the ICC-accredited testing center in Loughborough, United Kingdom, on January 21. This assessment is a standard procedure designed to ensure fair play and adherence to established bowling regulations. In February 2025, she was suspended for illegal bowling action. Initially she was selected in the under-19 squad for the 2025 Under-19 Women's T20 World Cup, but she withdrew in January 2025 and was replaced by Genevieve Morrissey, due to suspect bowling action.

In August 2025, after she passed the testing, she was cleared to resume bowling in international cricket.
