= Molly Penfold =

New Zealand cricketer (born 2001)

Personal information
- Full name: Molly Mae Penfold
- Born: 15 June 2001 (age 25); Kingston-upon-Thames, Surrey, England
- Batting: Right-handed
- Bowling: Right-arm medium
- Role: Bowler

International information
- National side: New Zealand
- ODI debut (cap 143): 21 September 2021 v England
- Last ODI: 2 July 2023 v Sri Lanka
- T20I debut (cap 62): 6 October 2022 v West Indies
- Last T20I: 11 July 2024 v England
- T20I shirt no.: 15

Domestic team information
- Years: Team
- 2020/21–present: Auckland

Career statistics
Competition	WODI	WT20
Matches	11	8
Runs scored	6	4
Batting average	1.50	2.00
100s/50s	0/0	0/0
Top score	2	2
Balls bowled	348	105
Wickets	5	5
Bowling average	59.80	27.80
5 wickets in innings	0	0
10 wickets in match	0	0
Best bowling	2/42	2/17
Catches/stumpings	1/–	1/–
Medal record
Representing New Zealand
Women's Cricket
T20 World Cup
Winner	2024 UAE
- Source: CricketArchive, 14 August 2024

Molly Mae Penfold (born 15 June 2001) is a New Zealand cricketer who plays for the Auckland Hearts. In April 2021, Penfold was added to New Zealand's Women's Twenty20 International (WT20I) squad for their third WT20I match against Australia. In August 2021, Penfold was added to New Zealand's squad for their tour of England, replacing Rosemary Mair who was ruled out due to an injury. She made her Women's One Day International (WODI) debut on 21 September 2021, for New Zealand against England.

In February 2022, Penfold was added to New Zealand's squad as a reserve player for the 2022 Women's Cricket World Cup.

In September 2024 she was named in the New Zealand squad for the 2024 ICC Women's T20 World Cup.

Penfold was named in the New Zealand squad for their ODI tour to India in October 2024.

== Early life ==
Penfold was born in Kingston Upon Thames, England, but moved to Auckland with her family at a young age. Her older sister, Josie, plays for Auckland alongside her. She attended Baradene College of the Sacred Heart in Auckland.
