= Ava Canning =

Irish cricketer (born 2004)

Personal information
- Born: 2 February 2004 (age 22)
- Batting: Right-handed
- Bowling: Right-arm medium
- Role: Bowler

International information
- National side: Ireland
- ODI debut (cap 96): 26 June 2023 v West Indies
- Last ODI: 19 December 2026 v South Africa
- T20I debut (cap 47): 24 May 2021 v Scotland
- Last T20I: 13 June 2026 v Scotland

Domestic team information
- Years: Team
- 2018: Typhoons
- 2019: Dragons
- 2020–present: Typhoons

Career statistics
Competition	WODI	WT20I
Matches	22	48
Runs scored	108	78
Batting average	7.20	7.09
100s/50s	0/0	0/0
Top score	20	25
Balls bowled	849	881
Wickets	16	35
Bowling average	39.06	22.77
5 wickets in innings	0	0
10 wickets in match	0	0
Best bowling	4/36	3/27
Catches/stumpings	4/–	7/–
- Source: Cricinfo, 17 August 2026

Ava Canning (born 2 February 2004) is an Irish cricketer who plays for Typhoons and Ireland.

== International career ==
In May 2021, Canning was named in Ireland's squad to face Scotland, for a four-match Women's Twenty20 International (WT20I) series in Belfast.

She made her WT20I debut on 24 May 2021, for Ireland against Scotland.

The following month, Canning was offered a non-retainer contract by Cricket Ireland and joined the senior women's performance squad.

On 26 June 2023 she made her WODI debut against West Indies in St Lucia, dismissing Hayley Matthews for her first wicket in the format.

Canning was named in the Ireland squad for their T20I and ODI tour to Bangladesh in November 2024.

Canning was part of the Ireland squad for the 2025 Women's Cricket World Cup Qualifier in Pakistan in April 2025.
