= 2009 RSA T20 Cup =

- Date: 28 – 29 May 2009
- Location: Ireland
- Result: Pakistan won the tri-series
- Player of the series: Cecelia Joyce (Ire)
Teams
Ireland	Nottinghamshire	Pakistan
Captains
Heather Whelan	Amanda Bacon	Sana Mir
Most runs
Clare Shillington (99)	Jane Smit (66)	Nain Abidi (112)
Most wickets
Jill Whelan (5)	Jasmine Titmuss (4); Nicky Myers (4)	Sana Mir (8)

The 2009 RSA T20 Cup was a Women's Twenty20 (T20) cricket tournament that was held in Ireland in May 2009. The tournament was originally planned as a tri-nation series between Ireland, Pakistan and South Africa, but Nottinghamshire replaced South Africa before the tournament began. It was part of Pakistan's tour of Ireland and England before the 2009 ICC Women's World Twenty20.

Pakistan won the tournament with four wins from their four matches, whilst Ireland and Nottinghamshire won one game apiece.

== Squads ==
Ireland	Nottinghamshire	Pakistan
Heather Whelan (c); Emma Beamish; Jean Carroll (wk); Marianne Herbert; Cecelia Joyce; Isobel Joyce; Amy Kenealy; Suzanne Kenealy; Eimear Richardson; Melissa Scott-Hayward; Clare Shillington; Jill Whelan	Amanda Bacon (c); Lily Brown; Hazelle Garton; Abbey Hawkins; Rachel Hawkins; Charlotte Horton; Marie McKenna; Nicky Myers; Sonia Odedra; Harriet Rogers; Jane Smit (wk); Jasmine Titmuss; Rebecca Widdowson	Sana Mir (c); Nain Abidi; Almas Akram; Batool Fatima (wk); Asmavia Iqbal; Marina Iqbal; Qanita Jalil; Armaan Khan; Javeria Khan; Bismah Maroof; Urooj Mumtaz; Nazia Sadiq; Sajjida Shah

== Points table ==
Team	Pld	W	L	T	NR	Bat	Bowl	Pts
Pakistan (C)	4	4	0	0	0	25	35	140
Ireland	4	1	3	0	0	20	22	62
Nottinghamshire	4	1	3	0	0	22	18	60

Source: CricketArchive

== Fixtures ==
28 May 2009
Scorecard

Nottinghamshire; 96/9 (20 overs)	v	Pakistan; 97/5 (17.5 overs)
Hazel Garton 30 (32); Urooj Mumtaz 2/7 (3 overs)		Nazia Sadiq 40 (37); Nicky Myers 2/15 (4 overs)

Pakistan Women won by 5 wickets
Malahide Cricket Club Ground, Malahide
Umpires: Ingeborg Bevers (Net) and Trevor Magee (Ire)
Player of the match: Urooj Mumtaz (Pak)

- Pakistan Women won the toss and elected to field.
- Points: Pakistan Women 34, Nottinghamshire Women 10

28 May 2009
Scorecard

Ireland; 86/9 (20 overs)	v	Pakistan; 87/7 (17.5 overs)
Clare Shillington 29 (27); Sana Mir 4/13 (4 overs)		Javeria Khan 16* (18); Heather Whelan 3/11 (4 overs)

Pakistan Women won by 3 wickets
Malahide Cricket Club Ground, Malahide
Umpires: Ingeborg Bevers (Net) and Louis Fourie (Ire)
Player of the match: Urooj Mumtaz (Pak)

- Ireland Women won the toss and elected to bat.
- Points: Pakistan Women 33, Ireland Women 11

28 May 2009
Scorecard

Nottinghamshire; 111/8 (20 overs)	v	Ireland; 112/5 (19.4 overs)
Amanda Bacon 31* (24); Jill Whelan 3/33 (4 overs)		Cecelia Joyce 26 (30); Jasmine Titmuss 2/6 (4 overs)

Ireland Women won by 5 wickets
Malahide Cricket Club Ground, Malahide
Umpires: Louis Fourie (Ire) and Trevor Magee (Ire)
Player of the match: Cecelia Joyce (Ire)

- Ireland Women won the toss and elected to field.
- Points: Ireland Women 35, Nottinghamshire Women 12

29 May 2009
Scorecard

Pakistan; 116/6 (20 overs)	v	Ireland; 78/7 (20 overs)
Nain Abidi 55 (55); Jill Whelan 2/26 (4 overs)		Cecelia Joyce 29* (50); Sana Mir 2/5 (3 overs)

Pakistan Women won by 38 runs
Observatory Lane, Dublin
Umpires: Ingeborg Bevers (Net) and Trevor Magee (Ire)
Player of the match: Nain Abidi (Pak)

- Pakistan Women won the toss and elected to bat.
- Points: Pakistan Women 34, Ireland Women 9
- Bismah Maroof (Pak) made her WT20I debut.

29 May 2009
Scorecard

Ireland; 105/2 (20 overs)	v	Nottinghamshire; 107/1 (16.2 overs)
Cecelia Joyce 34* (58); Charlotte Horton 1/17 (3 overs)		Charlotte Horton 54* (43); Isobel Joyce 1/28 (4 overs)

Nottinghamshire Women won by 9 wickets
Observatory Lane, Dublin
Umpires: Ingeborg Bevers (Net) and Louis Fourie (Ire)
Player of the match: Charlotte Horton (Not)

- Nottinghamshire Women won the toss and elected to field.
- Points: Nottinghamshire Women 31, Ireland Women 7

29 May 2009
Scorecard

Pakistan; 139/6 (20 overs)	v	Nottinghamshire; 57 (16 overs)
Asmavia Iqbal 55* (41); Lily Brown 2/26 (4 overs)		Abbey Hawkins 13 (14); Asmavia Iqbal 5/8 (4 overs)

Pakistan Women won by 82 runs
Observatory Lane, Dublin
Umpires: Louis Fourie (Ire) and Trevor Magee (Ire)

- Pakistan Women won the toss and elected to bat.
- Points: Pakistan Women 39, Nottinghamshire Women 7

== See also ==
- Pakistani women's cricket team in England and Ireland in 2009
