= Pakistan women's cricket team in England and Ireland in 2009 =

Pakistani women's cricket team in Ireland in 2009
	Ireland	Pakistan
- Dates: 25 – 29 May 2009
Captains	Heather Whelan	Sana Mir

One Day International series
- Results: Pakistan won the 1-match series 1–0
Most runs	Isobel Joyce (30)	Sajjida Shah (52)
Most wickets	Eimear Richardson (3)	Sana Mir (4)

Twenty20 International series
- Results: Ireland won the 1-match series 1–0
Most runs	Isobel Joyce (56)	Sajjida Shah (27)
Most wickets	Heather Whelan (1); Jill Whelan (1)	Sana Mir (1)

The Pakistan women's national cricket team toured Ireland and England in May and June 2009. They played Ireland in 1 One Day International and 1 Twenty20 International (their first ever in the format), winning the ODI but losing the T20I. They then played in the RSA T20 Cup against Ireland and Nottinghamshire, which they won with four wins from their four matches. Finally they travelled to England, and played England Academy in 3 T20s, after which they competed in the 2009 ICC Women's World Twenty20.

== Tour of Ireland ==
=== Squads ===
Ireland	Pakistan
Heather Whelan (c); Emma Beamish; Jean Carroll (wk); Marianne Herbert; Cecelia Joyce; Isobel Joyce; Amy Kenealy; Suzanne Kenealy; Eimear Richardson; Melissa Scott-Hayward; Clare Shillington; Jill Whelan	Sana Mir (c); Nain Abidi; Almas Akram; Batool Fatima (wk); Asmavia Iqbal; Marina Iqbal; Qanita Jalil; Armaan Khan; Javeria Khan; Bismah Maroof; Urooj Mumtaz; Nazia Sadiq; Sajjida Shah

=== Only T20I ===
25 May 2009
Scorecard

Pakistan; 80/3 (15 overs)	v	Ireland; 91/1 (10.3 overs)
Sajjida Shah 27* (24); Heather Whelan 1/5 (2 overs)		Isobel Joyce 56* (32); Sana Mir 1/19 (2.3 overs)

Ireland Women won by 9 wickets (D/L)
The Vineyard, Dublin
Umpires: Alan Neill (Ire) and Charlie McElwee (Ire)
Player of the match: Isobel Joyce (Ire)

- Pakistan Women won the toss and elected to bat.
- Suzanne Kenealy, Heather Whelan (Ire), Nain Abidi, Almas Akram, Batool Fatima, Asmavia Iqbal, Marina Iqbal, Qanita Jalil, Javeria Khan, Sana Mir, Urooj Mumtaz, Nazia Sadiq and Sajjida Shah (Pak) all made their WT20I debuts.
- Pakistan Women's innings was curtailed at 15 overs due to rain.
- Ireland Women's target was 91 to win in 15 overs.

=== Only ODI ===
26 May 2009
Scorecard

Pakistan; 141 (48 overs)	v	Ireland; 114 (41 overs)
Sajjida Shah 52 (101); Eimear Richardson 3/19 (8 overs)		Isobel Joyce 30 (41); Sana Mir 4/10 (7 overs)

Pakistan Women won by 27 runs
Castle Avenue, Dublin
Umpires: Alan Neill (Ire) and Charlie McElwee (Ire)

- Ireland Women won the toss and elected to field.
- Marina Iqbal (Pak) made her WODI debut.

== RSA T20 Cup ==
=== Squads ===
Ireland	Nottinghamshire	Pakistan
Heather Whelan (c); Emma Beamish; Jean Carroll (wk); Marianne Herbert; Cecelia Joyce; Isobel Joyce; Amy Kenealy; Suzanne Kenealy; Eimear Richardson; Melissa Scott-Hayward; Clare Shillington; Jill Whelan	Amanda Bacon (c); Lily Brown; Hazelle Garton; Abbey Hawkins; Rachel Hawkins; Charlotte Horton; Marie McKenna; Nicky Myers; Sonia Odedra; Harriet Rogers; Jane Smit (wk); Jasmine Titmuss; Rebecca Widdowson	Sana Mir (c); Nain Abidi; Almas Akram; Batool Fatima (wk); Asmavia Iqbal; Marina Iqbal; Qanita Jalil; Armaan Khan; Javeria Khan; Bismah Maroof; Urooj Mumtaz; Nazia Sadiq; Sajjida Shah

=== Fixtures ===
28 May 2009
Scorecard

Nottinghamshire; 96/9 (20 overs)	v	Pakistan; 97/5 (17.5 overs)
Hazel Garton 30 (32); Urooj Mumtaz 2/7 (3 overs)		Nazia Sadiq 40 (37); Nicky Myers 2/15 (4 overs)

Pakistan Women won by 5 wickets
Malahide Cricket Club Ground, Malahide
Umpires: Ingeborg Bevers (Net) and Trevor Magee (Ire)
Player of the match: Urooj Mumtaz (Pak)

- Pakistan Women won the toss and elected to field.
- Points: Pakistan Women 34, Nottinghamshire Women 10

28 May 2009
Scorecard

Ireland; 86/9 (20 overs)	v	Pakistan; 87/7 (17.5 overs)
Clare Shillington 29 (27); Sana Mir 4/13 (4 overs)		Javeria Khan 16* (18); Heather Whelan 3/11 (4 overs)

Pakistan Women won by 3 wickets
Malahide Cricket Club Ground, Malahide
Umpires: Ingeborg Bevers (Net) and Louis Fourie (Ire)
Player of the match: Urooj Mumtaz (Pak)

- Ireland Women won the toss and elected to bat.
- Points: Pakistan Women 33, Ireland Women 11

29 May 2009
Scorecard

Pakistan; 116/6 (20 overs)	v	Ireland; 78/7 (20 overs)
Nain Abidi 55 (55); Jill Whelan 2/26 (4 overs)		Cecelia Joyce 29* (50); Sana Mir 2/5 (3 overs)

Pakistan Women won by 38 runs
Observatory Lane, Dublin
Umpires: Ingeborg Bevers (Net) and Trevor Magee (Ire)
Player of the match: Nain Abidi (Pak)

- Pakistan Women won the toss and elected to bat.
- Points: Pakistan Women 34, Ireland Women 9
- Bismah Maroof (Pak) made her WT20I debut.

29 May 2009
Scorecard

Pakistan; 139/6 (20 overs)	v	Nottinghamshire; 57 (16 overs)
Asmavia Iqbal 55* (41); Lily Brown 2/26 (4 overs)		Abbey Hawkins 13 (14); Asmavia Iqbal 5/8 (4 overs)

Pakistan Women won by 82 runs
Observatory Lane, Dublin
Umpires: Louis Fourie (Ire) and Trevor Magee (Ire)

- Pakistan Women won the toss and elected to bat.
- Points: Pakistan Women 39, Nottinghamshire Women 7

== Tour of England ==
=== T20 Series v England Academy ===
==== 1st T20 ====
1 June 2009
Scorecard

Pakistan; 112/9 (20 overs)	v	England Academy; 59 (15.1 overs)
Sajjida Shah 26 (25); Lynsey Askew 3/20 (4 overs)		Rosalie Birch 12 (14); Javeria Khan 4/4 (4 overs)

Pakistan Women won by 53 runs
Kibworth Cricket Club New Ground, Kibworth
Umpires: Ian Armitage (Eng) and Harry Fidler (Eng)

- Toss unknown.

==== 2nd T20 ====
2 June 2009
Scorecard

Pakistan; 105/9 (20 overs)	v	England Academy; 106/3 (19.4 overs)
Marina Iqbal 30 (26); Alexia Walker 3/16 (4 overs)		Ebony Rainford-Brent 46* (51); Javeria Khan 2/17 (4 overs)

England Academy Women won by 7 wickets
Kibworth Cricket Club New Ground, Kibworth
Umpires: Ian Armitage (Eng) and Harry Fidler (Eng)

- Pakistan Women won the toss and elected to bat.

==== 3rd T20 ====
3 June 2009
Scorecard

Pakistan; 87 (19.1 overs)	v	England Academy; 88/2 (16 overs)
Sajjida Shah 29 (29); Lynsey Askew 4/13 (4 overs)		Ebony Rainford-Brent 42* (44); Sajjida Shah 2/16 (3 overs)

England Academy Women won by 8 wickets
Kibworth Cricket Club New Ground, Kibworth
Umpires: Ian Armitage (Eng) and Harry Fidler (Eng)

- Pakistan Women won the toss and elected to bat.

== See also ==
- 2009 RSA T20 Cup
- 2009 ICC Women's World Twenty20
