= Netherlands women's cricket team in Ireland in 2006 =

	Ireland	Netherlands
- Dates: 21 August 2006 – 23 August 2006
Captains	Heather Whelan	Caroline Salomons
Most runs	Caitriona Beggs (113)	Marijn Nijman (45)
Most wickets	Jill Whelan (3)	Annemarie Tanke (5)

One Day International series
- Results: Ireland won the 3-match series 2–0
Most runs	Caitriona Beggs (113)	Marijn Nijman (45)
Most wickets	Jill Whelan (3)	Annemarie Tanke (5)

The Netherlands women's national cricket team toured Ireland in August 2006 to play against the Ireland women's national cricket team in a 3 match WODI series. The 3 One Day Internationals were held in 3 consecutive dates from August 21–23.

The first WODI was called off due to rain and it was preferred to replace it as a 40 over warm-up match. Ireland won the 3 match WODI series 2-0 after winning the remaining One Day International matches.

== WODI series ==
=== 1st WODI ===
21 August 2006
Scorecard

Ireland	v	Netherlands

Observatory Lane, Dublin

- No toss
- No play was possible due to rain and wet outfield

=== 2nd WODI ===
22 August 2006
Scorecard

Ireland; 8/227 (50 overs)	v	Netherlands; 6/149 (50 overs)
Eimear Richardson 50* (45); Annemarie Tanke 2/39 (10 overs); Marjolijn Molenaar 2/39 (10 overs)		Marijn Nijman 32* (61); Isobel Joyce 2/32 (10 overs)

Ireland Women won by 78 runs
Observatory Lane, Dublin
Umpires: Joe Connolly (Ire) and Alastair Henderson (Ire)

- Netherlands Women won the toss and elected to field.
- Elaine Nolan (Ire), Marijke Overhoff, Marloes Braat and Jacqueline Pashley (Ned) made their WODI debuts.

=== 3rd WODI ===
23 August 2006
Scorecard

Ireland; 217 (49.2 overs)	v	Netherlands; 133 (48.5 overs)
Caitriona Beggs 77 (103); Annemarie Tanke 3/56 (10 overs)		Caroline Salomons 37 (87); Jill Whelan 3/20 (9 overs)

Ireland Women won by 84 runs
YMCA Cricket Club, Dublin
Umpires: Joe Connolly (Ire) and Alastair Henderson (Ire)

- Ireland Women won the toss and elected to bat.
- Denise Prins (Ned) made her WODI debut.
