= 2007 Future Cup =

Cricket series between India and South Africa

Future Cup 2007
	India	South Africa
- Dates: 26 June 2007 – 1 July 2007
Captains	Rahul Dravid	Jacques Kallis

One Day International series
- Results: India won the 3-match series 2–1
Most runs	Sachin Tendulkar (200)	Morne van Wyk (126)
Most wickets	Yuvraj Singh (3)	André Nel (4)
- Player of the series: Sachin Tendulkar (Ind)

The 2007 Future Cup was a 3 ODI cricket series between India and South Africa between 23 June and 1 July. The series was preceded by each team playing one match against Ireland.

== Squads ==
India	South Africa	Ireland
Rahul Dravid (c)	Jacques Kallis (c)	Trent Johnston (c)
Mahendra Singh Dhoni (wk)	Mark Boucher (wk)	Niall O'Brien (wk)
Ajit Agarkar	AB de Villiers	William Porterfield
Gautam Gambhir	Jean-Paul Duminy	Dominick Joyce
Sourav Ganguly	Herschelle Gibbs	Gary Wilson
Dinesh Karthik	Andrew Hall	Kevin O'Brien
Zaheer Khan	Justin Kemp	Andrew White
Piyush Chawla	Charl Langeveldt	Kyle McCallan
Ramesh Powar	André Nel	Thinus Fourie
Ishant Sharma	Makhaya Ntini	Roger Whelan
Rohit Sharma	Vernon Philander	Kenneth Carroll
R. P. Singh	Dale Steyn	Alex Cusack
Sreesanth	Thandi Tshabalala	
Sachin Tendulkar	Morne van Wyk	
Robin Uthappa		
Yuvraj Singh		

== Matches ==
=== Ireland Matches ===
==== 1st match: Ireland vs India ====
23 June 2007
(scorecard)

Ireland; 193 (50 overs)	v	India; 171/1 (34.5 overs)
Niall O'Brien 52 (79); Piyush Chawla 3/29 (10 overs)		Gautam Gambhir 80* (107); Roger Whelan 1/56 (8 overs)

India won by 9 wickets (D/L method)
Civil Service Cricket Club Ground, Stormont, Belfast, Northern Ireland
Umpires: Mark Benson (ENG) and Billy Bowden (NZL)
Player of the match: Gautam Gambhir

- India won the toss and elected to field
- India's innings shortened to 39 overs due to rain between innings.
- Gary Wilson, Thinus Fourie, Roger Whelan (Ire) and Rohit Sharma (Ind) made their ODI debuts.

==== 2nd match: Ireland vs South Africa ====
24 June 2007
(scorecard)

South Africa; 173/4 (31 overs)	v	Ireland; 131 (30.5 overs)
Morne van Wyk 52 (84); Alex Cusack 3/15 (4 overs)		Alex Cusack 36* (56); Vernon Philander 4/12 (5.5 overs)

South Africa win by 42 runs
Civil Service Cricket Club Ground, Stormont, Belfast, Northern Ireland
Umpires: Aleem Dar (PAK) and Billy Bowden (NZL)
Player of the match: Alex Cusack

- Ireland won the toss and elected to field.
- Match shortened to 31 overs per side due to rain.
- Alex Cusack (Ire), Vernon Philander, Thandi Tshabalala (SA) made their ODI debuts.

=== ODI Series ===
==== 1st match: India vs South Africa ====
26 June 2007
(scorecard)

India; 242/8 (50 overs)	v	South Africa; 245/6 (49.3 overs)
Sachin Tendulkar 99 (143); André Nel 3/47 (10 overs)		Jacques Kallis 91* (116); Piyush Chawla 3/47 (10 overs)

South Africa won by 4 wickets
Stormont, Belfast, Northern Ireland,
Umpires: Aleem Dar (PAK) and Mark Benson (ENG)
Player of the match: Jacques Kallis

- South Africa won the toss and elected to field.

==== 2nd match: India vs South Africa ====
29 June 2007
(scorecard)

South Africa; 226/6 (50 overs)	v	India; 227/4 (49.1 overs)
Morne van Wyk 82 (126); Yuvraj Singh 3/36 (9 overs)		Sachin Tendulkar 93 (106); Charl Langeveldt 2/43 (10 overs)

India won by 6 wickets
Stormont, Belfast, Northern Ireland
Umpires: Mark Benson (ENG) and Billy Bowden (NZL)
Player of the match: Sachin Tendulkar

- India won the toss elected to field.
- Ishant Sharma (Ind) made his ODI debut.
- Sachin Tendulkar became the first batsman to cross the 15000 run mark in One Day International history.

==== 3rd match: India vs South Africa ====
1 July 2007
(scorecard)

South Africa; 148/7 (31 overs)	v	India; 151/4 (30.2 overs)
Justin Kemp 61 (61); Herschelle Gibbs 56 (67); Sachin Tendulkar 2/10 (1 over); Ajit Agarkar 2/21 (6 overs)		Yuvraj Singh 61* (84); Rahul Dravid 35 (48); Makhaya Ntini 1/16 (7 overs); André Nel 1/22 (5.2 overs)

India won by 6 wickets
Stormont, Belfast, Northern Ireland
Umpires: Aleem Dar (PAK) and Mark Benson (ENG)
Player of the match: Yuvraj Singh

- Play reduced to 31 overs due to rain

== Statistics ==
Most runs

Player	Team	Mat	Inns	Runs	Ave	HS	100s	50s
Sachin Tendulkar	India	3	3	200	66.67	99	0	2
Morne van Wyk	South Africa	3	3	126	42.00	82	0	1
