= Pakistan women's cricket team in South Africa in 2006–07 =

Pakistani women's cricket team in South Africa in 2006–07
	South Africa	Pakistan
- Dates: 20 – 28 January 2007
Captains	Cri-Zelda Brits	Urooj Mumtaz

One Day International series
- Results: South Africa won the 5-match series 5–0
Most runs	Johmari Logtenberg (188)	Sajjida Shah (105)
Most wickets	Ashlyn Kilowan (10)	Urooj Mumtaz (7); Sajjida Shah (7)

The Pakistan national women's cricket team toured South Africa in 2006–07, playing five women's One Day Internationals. South Africa won the series 5–0.

== WODI series ==
=== 1st ODI ===
20 January 2007
Scorecard

South Africa; 225/7 (50 overs)	v	Pakistan; 127/8 (50 overs)
Johmari Logtenberg 79* (95); Qanita Jalil 3/51 (9 overs)		Urooj Mumtaz 29 (80); Ashlyn Kilowan 3/23 (10 overs)

South Africa won by 98 runs
Laudium Oval, Pretoria
Umpires: Petrus du Plessis and Lourens Engelbrecht

- South Africa won the toss and elected to bat.

=== 2nd ODI ===
22 January 2007
Scorecard

South Africa; 226 (49.5 overs)	v	Pakistan; 142/8 (50 overs)
Cri-Zelda Brits 54 (70); Urooj Mumtaz 5/40 (6.5 overs)		Sajjida Shah 34* (71); Sunette Loubser 2/21 (10 overs)

South Africa won by 84 runs
Harlequins, Pretoria
Umpires: Adriaan Crafford and Lourens Engelbrecht

- Pakistan won the toss and elected to field.

=== 3rd ODI ===
24 January 2007
Scorecard

Pakistan; 156/9 (50 overs)	v	South Africa; 160/4 (35.5 overs)
Sajjida Shah 36 (68); Marcia Letsoalo 3/27 (10 overs)		Cri-Zelda Brits 57 (76); Sajjida Shah 1/29 (10 overs)

South Africa won by 6 wickets
Sinovich Park, Pretoria
Umpires: Adriaan Crafford and Brad White

- Pakistan won the toss and elected to bat.

=== 4th ODI ===
26 January 2007
Scorecard

South Africa; 259/6 (50 overs)	v	Pakistan; 158/9 (50 overs)
Johmari Logtenberg 103* (112); Qanita Jalil 3/58 (10 overs)		Tasqeen Qadeer 45 (69); Ashlyn Kilowan 4/23 (10 overs)

South Africa won by 101 runs
Sinovich Park, Pretoria
Umpires: Walter Liebisch and Brad White

- South Africa won the toss and elected to bat.

=== 5th ODI ===
28 January 2007
Scorecard

South Africa; 218/6 (50 overs)	v	Pakistan; 145 (48 overs)
Claire Terblanche 61 (94); Sana Mir 2/31 (10 overs)		Bismah Maroof 79* (133); Claire Terblanche 5/35 (10 overs)

South Africa won by 73 runs
Sinovich Park, Pretoria
Umpires: Walter Liebisch and Brad White

- South Africa won the toss and elected to bat.
