= Overhoff =

Overhoff is a surname. Notable people with the surname include:

- Kurt Overhoff (1902–1986), Austrian conductor and composer
- Marijke Overhoff (born 1980), Dutch woman cricketer
- Sybille Edith Overhoff (born 1926), British expert on Etruscology

== See also ==
- Overhoff Technology, is a subsidiary of US Nuclear Corp. based in Milford, Ohio
