= Johmari Logtenberg =

South African cricketer

Personal information
- Full name: Johmari Logtenberg
- Born: 22 February 1989 (age 37); Vanderbijlpark, Transvaal, South Africa
- Nickname: Joe, Youngster
- Batting: Right-handed
- Bowling: Right-arm medium
- Role: Batter

International information
- National side: South Africa (2003–2007)
- Test debut (cap 39): 7 August 2003 v England
- Last Test: 28 July 2007 v Netherlands
- ODI debut (cap 35): 13 August 2003 v England
- Last ODI: 5 August 2007 v Netherlands
- T20I debut (cap 8): 10 August 2007 v New Zealand
- Last T20I: 10 August 2007 v England

Domestic team information
- Years: Team
- 2003/04–2007/08: KwaZulu-Natal

Career statistics
Competition	WTest	WODI	WT20I	WLA
Matches	3	26	2	62
Runs scored	109	848	30	2,496
Batting average	21.80	38.54	15.00	65.68
100s/50s	0/1	2/5	0/0	6/16
Top score	74	153*	29	155*
Balls bowled	162	297	42	1,590
Wickets	1	11	2	55
Bowling average	71.00	18.72	33.50	14.96
5 wickets in innings	0	0	0	2
10 wickets in match	0	0	0	0
Best bowling	1/47	3/6	2/35	6/14
Catches/stumpings	0/–	5/–	0/–	21/–
- Source: CricketArchive, 24 February 2022

Johmari Logtenberg (born 22 February 1989) is a South African former cricketer who played primarily as a right-handed batter. She appeared in three Test matches, 26 ODIs and two Twenty20 Internationals for South Africa between 2003 and 2007. She became the youngest player, male or female, to score a half-century in international cricket when she hit 74 on Test debut, aged 14. She played domestic cricket for KwaZulu-Natal.

== Career ==
Logtenberg made her Test debut for South Africa against England in 2003, aged 14 years and 166 days, becoming the second youngest Test player of all time. She scored 74 off 235 balls in South Africa's first innings sharing a 138-run partnership with Charlize van der Westhuizen which is a Test record for the fifth wicket. Logtenberg made her ODI debut a week later against the same opposition.

During England's tour of South Africa in early 2004, Logtenberg further enhanced her reputation by finishing the five match ODI series as South Africa's leading runscorer. Scoring fifties in the first and fifth match of the series. She was selected in the South Africa squad for the 2005 World Cup and played in all six of the sides match, scoring 98 runs.

In the 2005/06 season she became the first women to pass 1,000 runs in the Provincial League, reaching the landmark in 19 innings, her average at the time was 176.16. She was not dismissed at all in the 2005/06 season, during which she scored 431 runs. In the previous season she had scored 414 runs at an average of 207. At the 2006 South African Cricket Awards she was named Women's Cricketer of the Year.

In January 2007 Logtenberg recorded her maiden ODI century, scoring 103 not out off 112 balls against Pakistan. She finished the ODI series with 188 runs at an average of 94.00 and was named 'Batsman of the Series'. In August 2007 playing against the Netherlands she became the only South African women to score two ODI centuries, with an innings of 153 not out. The score is the highest by a South African in women's ODI cricket.

In January 2008 Cricket South Africa announced that Logtenberg's omission from the World Cup qualifying squad was because she had quit cricket and had taken up golf. Logtenberg cited the lack of finances in women's cricket as a reason for the switch.

Logtenberg was diagnosed with a talo-calcaneal coalition in 2011 which ended her sporting career. She studied to be a chiropractor, completing her master's degree at the Durban University of Technology in 2018 and now has her own practice in Tzaneen.

== One Day International centuries ==
Runs	Match	Opponents	City	Venue	Year
103*	23	Pakistan	Pretoria, South Africa	Sinovich Park	2007
153*	26	Netherlands	Deventer, Netherlands	Sportpark Het Schootsveld	2007

- Source: CricInfo

== See also ==
- List of centuries in women's One Day International cricket
