= List of centuries in women's One Day International cricket =

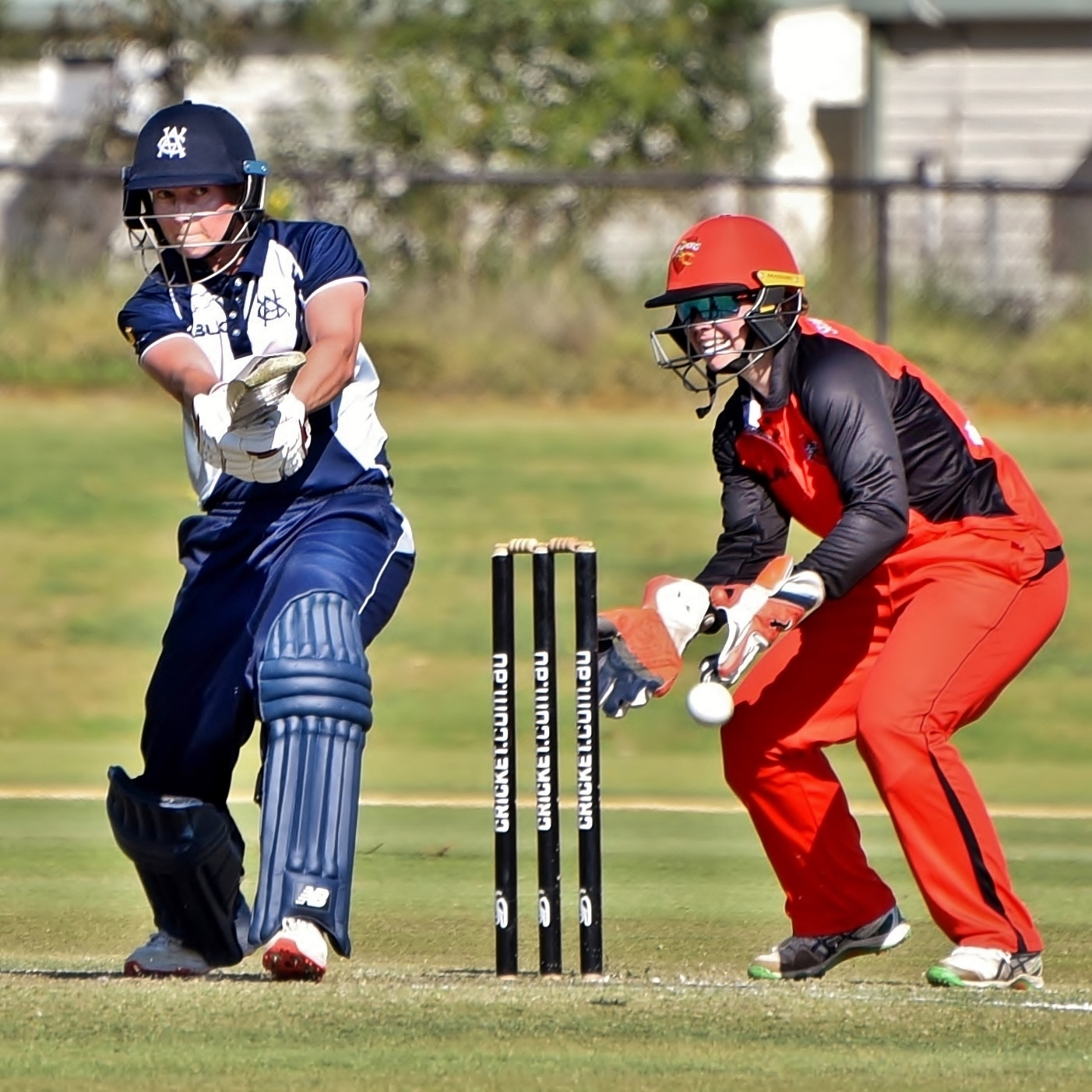
Meg Lanning of Australia has scored the most centuries in WODIs with 15.

A women's One Day International (WODI) is an international cricket match between two teams, each having WODI status, as determined by the International Cricket Council (ICC). In a WODI match, the two teams play a single innings, each of which is restricted to a maximum of fifty overs. (Note: For the first 25 years of ODI cricket the number of overs bowled in each innings varied between 35 and 60 overs.) The first WODI matches were played as part of the Women's Cricket World Cup in 1973 held in England, two years after the first men's One Day International was contested between Australia and England in January 1971. A century is a score of one hundred or more runs by a batsman in a single innings. This is regarded as a notable achievement. As of October 2026, 382 centuries have been scored by 124 different players from over 1,500 WODI matches.

The first two centuries in WODIs were scored as part of the opening round in the 1973 Women's World Cup. England's Lynne Thomas and Enid Bakewell both achieved the feat as part of their team's victory over the International XI. Thomas and Bakewell are two of only eight players to score a century during their WODI debut, the others being Nicole Bolton of Australia, India's Reshma Gandhi and Mithali Raj, Natthakan Chantam of Thailand, Zimbabwe's Mary-Anne Musonda, and United States' Chetna Pagydyala; Thomas, Bakewell, Chantam and Musonda's centuries all came in their teams' maiden WODIs. Raj and Gandhi centuries came in a match against Ireland in 1999 which saw Raj become the then youngest player to score a century, aged 16 years 205 days. This record stood for 22 years before it was broken by Ireland's Amy Hunter who scored hers on her 16th birthday against Zimbabwe in 2021. Raj and Gandhi's centuries are one of 53 occurrences where two or more centuries have been scored in a WODI. The oldest player to score a WODI century is New Zealand's Barbara Bevege who was aged 39 years and 48 days when she reached 101 against the International XI during the 1982 Women's World Cup.

The most recent century, as of October 2026, was scored by Deepti Sharma of India against Zimbabwe at Baroda Cricket Association Stadium, Vadodara in October 2026.

Meg Lanning of Australia holds the record for the most centuries, having scored 15. She is followed by Smriti Mandhana of India and Hayley Matthews of West Indies with 14 centuries each, and Suzie Bates of New Zealand and Laura Wolvaardt of South Africa with 13 centuries each.

New Zealand's Amelia Kerr holds the record for the highest individual score in a WODI with 232* scored against Ireland in June 2018, eclipsing the record of Australia's Belinda Clark's 229* scored against Denmark in 1997, becoming the youngest cricketer, male or female, to score a double century in One Day International cricket. As this was Kerr's first time reaching the milestone, the innings was also the highest maiden WODI century scored breaking Deepti Sharma of India's mark of 188 against Ireland during the 2017 South Africa Women's Quadrangular Series. Amy Satterthwaite of New Zealand has scored four consecutive WODI centuries, the sole player to do so.

48 centuries have been scored by a player in a losing side, the highest score being 184* by South Africa's Laura Wolvaardt whose team lost to Sri Lanka in April 2024. A further five centuries have been scored in matches that have ended in a no result.

Australia leads the list with 83 centuries, followed by England with 77, New Zealand with 58 and India with 49. Bert Sutcliffe Oval in Lincoln, New Zealand, leads the list of where the most centuries have been scored with 14, ahead of the National Stadium in Karachi with 11, JB Marks Oval and Grace Road with 10 each and Gaddafi Stadium and Allan Border Field with 9 each.

== Key ==
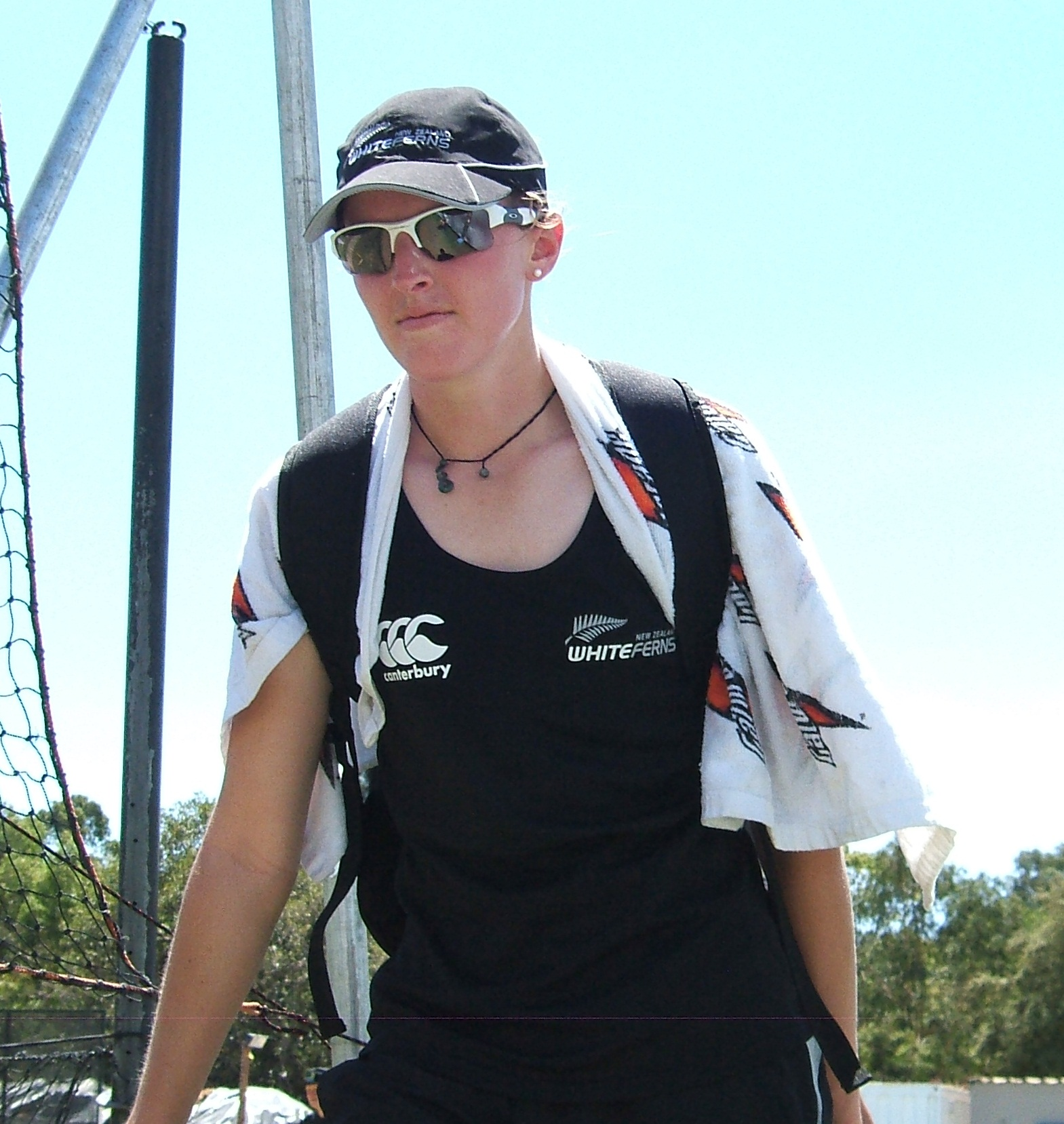
New Zealand's Amy Satterthwaite scored her fourth consecutive century in February 2017, a WODI record.

Key
Symbol	Meaning
Player	The batsman who scored the century
†	The batsman was named player of the match
Runs	Number of runs scored
*	Batsman remained not out
Balls	Number of balls faced
–	Statistic not recorded or available
4s	Number of fours scored
6s	Number of sixes scored
S/R	Strike rate (runs scored per 100 balls)
Inn	Innings in which the century was made
Team	The team the batsman was representing
Opposition	The team the batsman was playing against
Venue	The cricket ground where the match was played
Date	The date when the match was played
Result	Result for the team for which the century was scored
	Light blue background indicates this happened during a Women's Cricket World Cup match.

== Centuries ==
List of centuries in women's One Day International cricket
No.	Player	Runs	Balls	4s	6s	S/R	Inn	Team	Opposition	Venue	Date	Result	Ref(s)
1	Lynne Thomas (Note: No player of the match was awarded.)	134	–	19	0	–	1	England	International XI	County Cricket Ground, Hove, England	23 June 1973	Won	
2	Enid Bakewell (1/2)	101*	–	6	0	–	1	England	International XI	County Cricket Ground, Hove, England	23 June 1973	Won	
3	Rachael Heyhoe Flint	114	–	11	1	–	1	England	Young England	Valentines Park, Ilford, England	18 July 1973	Won	
4	Enid Bakewell (2/2)	118	–	11	0	–	1	England	Australia	Edgbaston Cricket Ground, Birmingham, England	28 July 1973	Won	
5	Lorraine Hill	106	–	10	0	–	1	Australia	England	St Lawrence Ground, Canterbury, England	1 August 1976	Won	
6	Barbara Bevege	101	–	9	0	–	1	New Zealand	International XI	Eden Park Outer Oval, Auckland, New Zealand	12 January 1982	Won	
7	Jan Brittin (1/5)	138*	175	11	0	78.86	1	England	International XI	Seddon Park, Hamilton, New Zealand	14 January 1982	Won	
8	Jan Brittin (2/5)	101	–	6	0	–	1	England	New Zealand	Horntye Park, Hastings, England	24 June 1984	Won	
9	Jill Kennare (1/2)	122	139	12	0	87.76	1	Australia	England	Aberfeldie Park, Melbourne, Australia	2 February 1985	Won	
10	Jill Kennare (2/2)	100*	149	10	0	67.11	2	Australia	England	Aberfeldie Park, Melbourne, Australia	3 February 1985	Won	
11	Lindsay Reeler (1/2)	143*	–	9	1	–	1	Australia	Netherlands	Willetton Sports Club (No. 1 Oval), Perth, Australia	29 November 1988	Won	
12	Ruth Buckstein (1/2)	100	–	1	0	–	1	Australia	Netherlands	Willetton Sports Club (No. 1 Oval), Perth, Australia	29 November 1988	Won	
13	Nicki Turner	114	144	10	0	79.17	1	New Zealand	Netherlands	Bon Andrews Oval, Sydney, Australia	4 December 1988	Won	
14	Lindsay Reeler (2/2)	108*	176	2	0	61.36	1	Australia	New Zealand	Albert Cricket Ground, Melbourne, Australia	10 December 1988	Won	
15	Ruth Buckstein (2/2)	105*	–	2	0	–	1	Australia	Netherlands	Carey Grammar School Oval No.2, Melbourne, Australia	14 December 1988	Won	
16	Wendy Watson	107*	168	0	0	63.69	1	England	Ireland	Great Oakley Cricket Club Ground, Northampton, England	22 July 1990	Won	
17	Denise Annetts	100*	104	4	0	96.15	1	Australia	England	Lancaster Park, Christchurch, New Zealand	25 January 1992	No result	
18	Jan Brittin (3/5)	104	151	2	0	68.87	1	England	Denmark	Recreation Ground, Banstead, England	20 July 1993	Won	
19	Carole Hodges (1/2)	113	172	11	0	65.70	1	England	Ireland	Sonning Lane, Reading, England	24 July 1993	Won	
20	Helen Plimmer	118	148	12	0	79.73	1	England	Ireland	Sonning Lane, Reading, England	24 July 1993	Won	
21	Jan Brittin (4/5)	100	186	3	0	53.76	1	England	India	Memorial Ground, Finchampstead, England	25 July 1993	Won	
22	Carole Hodges (2/2)	105*	141	9	0	74.47	1	England	Australia	Woodbridge Road, Guildford, England	26 July 1993	Won	
23	Mary-Pat Moore †	114*	149	7	0	76.51	1	Ireland	Denmark	Park Avenue, Dublin, Ireland	18 July 1995	Won	
24	Debbie Hockley † (1/4)	117	136	13	0	86.03	1	New Zealand	England	Riverside Ground, Chester-le-Street, England	18 June 1996	Won	
25	Karen Le Comber	135*	145	8	0	93.10	1	New Zealand	Ireland	Sydney Parade, Dublin, Ireland	19 July 1996	Won	
26	Maia Lewis	105	72	11	0	145.83	1	New Zealand	Pakistan	Hagley Oval, Christchurch, New Zealand	29 January 1997	Won	
27	Belinda Clark (1/5)	131	97	12	1	135.05	1	Australia	Pakistan	Wesley Cricket Ground, Melbourne, Australia	7 February 1997	Won	
28	Lisa Keightley (1/4)	156*	147	15	0	106.12	1	Australia	Pakistan	Wesley Cricket Ground, Melbourne, Australia	7 February 1997	Won	
29	Belinda Clark (2/5)	142	130	13	1	109.23	1	Australia	New Zealand	Eden Park, Auckland, New Zealand	16 February 1997	Won	
30	Karen Rolton (1/8)	113*	121	13	0	93.39	2	Australia	New Zealand	Basin Reserve, Wellington, New Zealand	23 February 1997	Won	
31	Charlotte Edwards † (1/9)	102	118	15	0	86.44	1	England	South Africa	County Ground, Taunton, England	17 August 1997	Lost	
32	Jan Brittin † (5/5)	138	124	17	0	111.29	1	England	Pakistan	Indira Gandhi Stadium, Vijayawada, India	12 December 1997	Won	
33	Barbara Daniels	142*	103	18	1	137.86	1	England	Pakistan	Indira Gandhi Stadium, Vijayawada, India	12 December 1997	Won	
34	Debbie Hockley † (2/4)	100*	147	8	0	68.02	1	New Zealand	Sri Lanka	Sector 16 Stadium, Chandigarh, India	13 December 1997	Won	
35	Debbie Hockley † (3/4)	100	112	12	0	89.28	1	New Zealand	West Indies	Sector 16 Stadium, Chandigarh, India	15 December 1997	Won	
36	Belinda Clark † (3/5)	229*	155	22	0	147.74	1	Australia	Denmark	Middle Income Group Club Ground, Mumbai, India	16 December 1997	Won	
37	Charlotte Edwards † (2/9)	173*	155	19	0	111.61	1	England	Ireland	Nehru Stadium, Pune, India	16 December 1997	Won	
38	Lisa Keightley † (2/4)	113*	143	7	0	79.02	1	Australia	England	Lord's, London, England	21 July 1998	Won	
39	Reshma Gandhi	104*	164	7	0	63.41	1	India	Ireland	Campbell Park Cricket Ground, Milton Keynes, England	26 June 1999	Won	
40	Mithali Raj (1/7)	114*	139	12	0	82.01	1	India	Ireland	Campbell Park Cricket Ground, Milton Keynes, England	26 June 1999	Won	
41	Anjum Chopra †	100	128	13	0	78.12	1	India	England	County Ground, Northampton, England	9 July 1999	Won	
42	Karen Smithies †	110*	146	10	0	75.34	2	England	India	Trent Bridge, Nottingham, England	11 July 1999	Won	
43	Lisa Keightley † (3/4)	127*	152	17	0	83.55	1	Australia	England	Sydney Cricket Ground, Sydney, Australia	29 January 2000	Won	
44	Belinda Clark † (4/5)	146*	151	6	0	96.68	1	Australia	England	Newcastle Number 1 Sports Ground, Newcastle, Australia	3 February 2000	Won	
45	Debbie Hockley (4/4)	100	159	9	0	62.89	2	New Zealand	Australia	Albert Cricket Ground, Melbourne, Australia	6 February 2000	Lost	
46	Miriam Grealey	101	105	10	0	96.19	1	Ireland	Pakistan	Kenure, Dublin, Ireland	25 July 2000	Won	
47	Karen Young	120	–	–	–	–	1	Ireland	Pakistan	Sydney Parade, Dublin, Ireland	27 July 2000	Won	
48	Emily Drumm † (1/2)	116	152	11	0	76.31	1	New Zealand	England	Centennial Park, Oamaru, New Zealand	19 November 2000	Won	
49	Charlotte Edwards † (3/9)	139*	152	17	0	91.44	1	England	Netherlands	Bert Sutcliffe Oval, Lincoln, New Zealand	30 November 2000	Won	
50	Karen Rolton † (2/8)	154*	118	19	0	130.50	1	Australia	Sri Lanka	Hagley Oval, Christchurch, New Zealand	1 December 2000	Won	
51	Emily Drumm † (2/2)	108*	104	8	0	103.84	1	New Zealand	South Africa	Lincoln Green, Lincoln, New Zealand	11 December 2000	Won	
52	Claire Taylor † (1/8)	137*	145	16	0	94.48	1	England	Sri Lanka	Bert Sutcliffe Oval, Lincoln, New Zealand	12 December 2000	Won	
53	Karen Rolton † (3/8)	107*	67	18	0	159.70	2	Australia	South Africa	Bert Sutcliffe Oval, Lincoln, New Zealand	13 December 2000	Won	
54	Linda Olivier †	101*	117	10	0	86.32	2	South Africa	Ireland	Hagley Oval No. 2, Christchurch, New Zealand	16 December 2000	Won	
55	Rebecca Rolls (1/2)	114	120	14	1	95.00	1	New Zealand	Australia	Bert Sutcliffe Oval, Lincoln, New Zealand	6 March 2002	Lost	
56	Karen Rolton † (4/8)	105*	102	13	0	102.94	2	Australia	New Zealand	Bert Sutcliffe Oval, Lincoln, New Zealand	6 March 2002	Won	
57	Pauline te Beest (1/2)	138	98	21	0	140.81	1	Netherlands	Scotland	Sportpark Hofbrouckerlaan, Oegstgeest, Netherlands	21 July 2003	Won	
58	Pauline te Beest (2/2)	142	–	–	–	–	1	Netherlands	Japan	Sportpark Harga, Schiedam, Netherlands	23 July 2003	Won	
59	Karen Rolton (5/8)	102*	133	11	0	76.69	1	Australia	New Zealand	Eden Park Outer Oval, Auckland, New Zealand	11 February 2004	Won	
60	Belinda Clark (5/5)	120	148	13	0	81.08	1	Australia	New Zealand	Seddon Park, Hamilton, New Zealand	17 February 2004	Won	
61	Charlotte Edwards † (4/9)	102	117	13	0	87.17	1	England	South Africa	Buffalo Park, East London, South Africa	18 February 2004	Won	
62	Arundhati Kirkire †	106	118	9	0	89.83	1	India	West Indies	Tau Devi Lal Stadium, Gurgaon, India	12 March 2004	Won	
63	Helen Watson †	115*	114	14	0	100.87	1	New Zealand	Ireland	Anglesea Road, Dublin, Ireland	25 July 2004	Won	
64	Claire Taylor † (2/8)	136	128	11	1	106.25	1	England	Sri Lanka	Harlequins, Pretoria, South Africa	24 March 2005	Won	
65	Lisa Keightley † (4/4)	103	153	4	0	67.32	1	Australia	South Africa	LC de Villiers Oval, Pretoria, South Africa	28 March 2005	Won	
66	Karen Rolton † (6/8)	107*	128	11	0	83.59	1	Australia	India	SuperSport Park, Centurion, South Africa	10 April 2005	Won	
67	Karen Rolton (7/8)	151	114	20	1	132.45	1	Australia	Ireland	Claremont Road Cricket Ground, Dublin, Ireland	31 July 2005	Won	
68	Lisa Sthalekar (1/2)	100*	123	8	0	81.30	1	Australia	Ireland	Claremont Road Cricket Ground, Dublin, Ireland	31 July 2005	Won	
69	Claire Taylor † (3/8)	116	133	15	0	87.21	2	England	Australia	County Ground, Taunton, England	30 August 2005	Won	
70	Karu Jain †	103	147	15	0	70.06	1	India	England	Eden Gardens, Kolkata, India	9 December 2005	Won	
71	Jaya Sharma † (1/2)	138*	150	15	0	92.00	1	India	Pakistan	National Stadium, Karachi, Pakistan	30 December 2005	Won	
72	Mithali Raj † (2/7)	108*	121	7	0	89.25	1	India	Sri Lanka	National Stadium, Karachi, Pakistan	4 January 2006	Won	
73	Claire Taylor (4/8)	156*	151	9	0	103.31	1	England	India	Lord's, London, England	14 August 2006	Won	
74	Leah Poulton (1/2)	101	136	7	1	74.26	1	Australia	New Zealand	Allan Border Field, Brisbane, Australia	24 October 2006	Won	
75	Johmari Logtenberg (1/2)	103*	112	6	0	91.96	1	South Africa	Pakistan	Sinovich Park, Pretoria, South Africa	26 January 2007	Won	
76	Rebecca Rolls † (2/2)	104*	87	18	1	119.54	2	New Zealand	Australia	Chemplast Cricket Ground, Chennai, India	21 February 2007	Won	
77	Jaya Sharma † (2/2)	104*	140	15	0	74.28	2	India	Australia	M. A. Chidambaram Stadium, Chennai, India	23 February 2007	Won	
78	Claire Taylor (5/8)	113*	115	15	1	98.26	1	England	Australia	Chemplast Cricket Ground, Chennai, India	25 February 2007	Lost	
79	Sarah Taylor (1/7)	101	111	15	0	90.99	1	England	Australia	Chemplast Cricket Ground, Chennai, India	1 March 2007	Lost	
80	Suzie Bates † (1/13)	122	134	11	0	91.04	1	New Zealand	India	M. A. Chidambaram Stadium, Chennai, India	1 March 2007	Won	
81	Aimee Watkins (1/2)	102	128	13	1	79.68	1	New Zealand	Australia	Gardens Oval, Darwin, Australia	22 July 2007	Won	
82	Daleen Terblanche	114*	148	14	0	77.02	1	South Africa	Netherlands	Sportpark Maarschalkerweerd, Utrecht, Netherlands	4 August 2007	Won	
83	Johmari Logtenberg (2/2)	153*	160	12	1	95.62	1	South Africa	Netherlands	Sportpark Het Schootsveld, Deventer, Netherlands	5 August 2007	Won	
84	Claire Taylor (6/8)	110	133	12	0	82.70	1	England	New Zealand	County Ground, Derby, England	23 August 2007	Lost	
85	Aimee Watkins † (2/2)	111	130	9	1	85.38	1	New Zealand	England	Stanley Park, Blackpool, England	26 August 2007	Won	
86	Alex Blackwell † (1/3)	101	159	6	0	63.52	1	Australia	England	Melbourne Cricket Ground, Melbourne, Australia	4 February 2008	Won	
87	Cri-Zelda Brits †	107*	130	4	0	82.30	1	South Africa	Netherlands	Stellenbosch University Ground No. 1, Stellenbosch, South Africa	21 February 2008	Won	
88	Claire Taylor (7/8)	111*	111	15	0	100.00	2	England	New Zealand	Bert Sutcliffe Oval, Lincoln, New Zealand	25 February 2008	Won	
89	Sarah Taylor (2/7)	129	133	9	1	96.99	1	England	South Africa	Lord's, London, England	8 August 2008	Won	
90	Caroline Atkins †	145	155	12	0	93.54	1	England	South Africa	Lord's, London, England	8 August 2008	Won	
91	Lisa Sthalekar (2/2)	104*	112	10	0	92.85	1	Australia	India	Sydney Cricket Ground, Sydney, Australia	1 November 2008	Won	
92	Alex Blackwell (2/3)	106*	145	7	0	73.10	1	Australia	India	Manuka Oval, Canberra, Australia	8 November 2008	Won	
93	Karen Rolton (8/8)	101	91	12	0	110.98	1	Australia	India	Manuka Oval, Canberra, Australia	8 November 2008	Won	
94	Claire Taylor † (8/8)	101	95	10	0	106.31	1	England	Sri Lanka	Manuka Oval, Canberra, Australia	7 March 2009	Won	
95	Haidee Tiffen	100	128	3	0	78.12	1	New Zealand	Pakistan	Drummoyne Oval, Sydney, Australia	19 March 2009	Won	
96	Suzie Bates † (2/13)	168	105	19	6	160.00	1	New Zealand	Pakistan	Drummoyne Oval, Sydney, Australia	19 March 2009	Won	
97	Sarah Taylor † (3/7)	120	120	12	0	100.00	1	England	Australia	County Cricket Ground, Chelmsford, England	30 June 2009	Won	
98	Stafanie Taylor † (1/10)	108*	117	11	2	92.30	2	West Indies	South Africa	Boland Park, Paarl, South Africa	16 October 2009	Won	
99	Leah Poulton (2/2)	104*	116	9	3	89.65	2	Australia	New Zealand	Junction Oval, Melbourne, Australia	17 February 2010	Won	
100	Shelley Nitschke	113*	130	7	4	86.92	2	Australia	New Zealand	Queens Park, Invercargill, New Zealand	6 March 2010	Won	
101	Stafanie Taylor † (2/10)	147	141	15	1	104.25	1	West Indies	Netherlands	Witrand Cricket Field, Potchefstroom, South Africa	6 October 2010	Won	
102	Meg Lanning † (1/15)	104*	118	8	1	88.13	2	Australia	England	WACA Ground, Perth, Australia	7 January 2011	Won	
103	Mithali Raj (3/7)	109*	106	12	0	102.83	1	India	West Indies	Madhavrao Scindia Cricket Ground, Rajkot, India	18 January 2011	Won	
104	Chamari Athapaththu (1/9)	111	110	17	1	100.90	1	Sri Lanka	Ireland	Paikiasothy Saravanamuttu Stadium, Colombo, Sri Lanka	28 April 2011	No result	
105	Lydia Greenway †	125*	127	12	0	98.42	1	England	South Africa	Senwes Park, Potchefstroom, South Africa	21 October 2011	Won	
106	Arran Brindle	107*	102	15	0	104.90	1	England	South Africa	Senwes Park, Potchefstroom, South Africa	21 October 2011	Won	
107	Charlotte Edwards † (5/9)	138	139	22	0	99.28	1	England	South Africa	Senwes Park, Potchefstroom, South Africa	23 October 2011	Won	
108	Stafanie Taylor (3/10)	107	154	9	1	69.48	1	West Indies	Ireland	Bangladesh Krira Shikkha Protisthan No 3 Ground, Dhaka, Bangladesh	14 November 2011	Won	
109	Juliana Nero †	100	100	13	3	100.00	1	West Indies	Ireland	Bangladesh Krira Shikkha Protisthan No 3 Ground, Dhaka, Bangladesh	14 November 2011	Won	
110	Charlotte Edwards † (6/9)	137*	88	20	0	155.68	1	England	New Zealand	Bert Sutcliffe Oval, Lincoln, New Zealand	3 March 2012	Won	
111	Sarah Taylor † (4/7)	109*	113	9	0	96.46	2	England	New Zealand	Bert Sutcliffe Oval, Lincoln, New Zealand	5 March 2012	Won	
112	Meg Lanning (2/15)	128	104	19	1	123.07	1	Australia	India	Wankhede Stadium, Mumbai, India	14 March 2012	Won	
113	Nain Abidi	101*	129	9	0	78.29	1	Pakistan	Ireland	Claremont Road Cricket Ground, Dublin, Ireland	22 August 2012	Won	
114	Suzie Bates † (3/13)	122*	131	16	1	93.12	2	New Zealand	Australia	Sydney Cricket Ground, Sydney, Australia	12 December 2012	Won	
115	Amy Satterthwaite † (1/7)	109	119	9	2	91.59	1	New Zealand	Australia	North Sydney Oval, Sydney, Australia	14 December 2012	Lost	
116	Meg Lanning † (3/15)	103	50	18	3	206.00	2	Australia	New Zealand	North Sydney Oval, Sydney, Australia	17 December 2012	Won	
117	Thirush Kamini † (1/2)	100	146	11	1	68.49	1	India	West Indies	Brabourne Stadium, Mumbai, India	31 January 2013	Won	
118	Sophie Devine † (1/9)	145	131	13	6	110.68	1	New Zealand	South Africa	DRIEMS Ground, Cuttack, India	1 February 2013	Won	
119	Charlotte Edwards † (7/9)	109	123	16	0	88.61	1	England	India	Brabourne Stadium, Mumbai, India	3 February 2013	Won	
120	Harmanpreet Kaur (1/8)	107*	109	8	2	98.16	2	India	England	Brabourne Stadium, Mumbai, India	3 February 2013	Lost	
121	Stafanie Taylor † (4/10)	171	137	18	2	124.81	1	West Indies	Sri Lanka	Middle Income Group Club Ground, Mumbai, India	3 February 2013	Won	
122	Suzie Bates (4/13)	102	134	12	0	76.11	1	New Zealand	Australia	DRIEMS Ground, Cuttack, India	5 February 2013	Lost	
123	Meg Lanning † (4/15)	112	104	17	1	107.69	2	Australia	New Zealand	DRIEMS Ground, Cuttack, India	5 February 2013	Won	
124	Marizanne Kapp † (1/4)	102*	150	11	0	68.00	1	South Africa	Pakistan	Barabati Stadium, Cuttack, India	5 February 2013	Won	
125	Mithali Raj † (4/7)	103*	141	13	1	73.04	2	India	Pakistan	Barabati Stadium, Cuttack, India	7 February 2013	Won	
126	Amy Satterthwaite (2/7)	103	126	16	0	81.74	2	New Zealand	England	Brabourne Stadium, Mumbai, India	13 February 2013	Lost	
127	Charlotte Edwards † (8/9)	106*	121	15	0	87.60	2	England	New Zealand	Brabourne Stadium, Mumbai, India	15 February 2013	Won	
128	Shemaine Campbelle	105	138	8	4	76.08	1	West Indies	Sri Lanka	Rangiri Dambulla International Stadium, Dambulla, Sri Lanka	24 February 2013	Lost	
129	Harmanpreet Kaur (2/8)	103	100	11	2	103.00	1	India	Bangladesh	Sardar Patel Stadium, Ahmedabad, India	10 April 2013	Won	
130	Mignon du Preez † (1/2)	100*	105	10	0	95.23	1	South Africa	Bangladesh	Wanderers Stadium, Johannesburg, South Africa	22 September 2013	Won	
131	Suzie Bates † (5/13)	110	133	9	0	82.70	1	New Zealand	West Indies	Sabina Park, Kingston, Jamaica	6 October 2013	Won	
132	Stafanie Taylor † (5/10)	135*	148	14	0	91.21	1	West Indies	New Zealand	Sabina Park, Kingston, Jamaica	10 October 2013	Won	
133	Sarah Taylor † (5/7)	100	108	7	0	92.59	1	England	West Indies	Queen's Park Oval, Port of Spain, Trinidad and Tobago	3 November 2013	Won	
134	Nicole Bolton † (1/4)	124	152	12	0	81.57	1	Australia	England	Melbourne Cricket Ground, Melbourne, Australia	23 January 2014	Won	
135	Mithali Raj (5/7)	104*	109	8	2	95.41	1	India	Sri Lanka	ACA-VDCA Cricket Stadium, Visakhapatnam, India	23 January 2014	Won	
136	Charlotte Edwards † (9/9)	108*	145	11	0	74.48	1	England	India	North Marine Road Ground, Scarborough, England	23 August 2014	Won	
137	Chamari Athapaththu (2/9)	106	151	11	0	70.19	1	Sri Lanka	South Africa	Singhalese Sports Club Cricket Ground, Colombo, Sri Lanka	17 October 2014 (Note: Rain prevented any play in the second innings taking place, so the match was to be resumed on the reserve day of 18 October 2014. However no play was possible due to further rain.)	No result	
138	Meg Lanning † (5/15)	135*	127	21	0	106.29	2	Australia	West Indies	Bradman Oval, Bowral, Australia	16 November 2014	Won	
139	Javeria Khan † (1/2)	133*	141	12	0	94.32	2	Pakistan	Sri Lanka	Sharjah Cricket Stadium, Sharjah, United Arab Emirates	13 January 2015	Won	
140	Suzie Bates † (6/13)	106	113	14	0	93.80	1	New Zealand	England	Bay Oval, Tauranga, New Zealand	11 February 2015	Won	
141	Meg Lanning † (6/15)	104	98	13	0	106.12	1	Australia	England	Bristol County Ground, Bristol, England	23 July 2015	Won	
142	Rachel Priest † (1/2)	108	116	12	0	93.10	1	New Zealand	Sri Lanka	Bert Sutcliffe Oval, Lincoln, New Zealand	3 November 2015	Won	
143	Rachel Priest † (2/2)	157	146	23	0	107.53	1	New Zealand	Sri Lanka	Bert Sutcliffe Oval, Lincoln, New Zealand	7 November 2015	Won	
144	Alex Blackwell † (3/3)	114	112	12	0	101.78	1	Australia	India	Manuka Oval, Canberra, Australia	2 February 2016	Won	
145	Smriti Mandhana † (1/14)	102	109	11	0	93.57	1	India	Australia	Bellerive Oval, Hobart, Australia	5 February 2016	Lost	
146	Meg Lanning † (7/15)	114*	113	12	3	100.88	2	Australia	New Zealand	Bay Oval, Tauranga, New Zealand	22 February 2016	Won	
147	Suzie Bates (7/13)	110	133	11	0	82.70	1	New Zealand	Australia	Bay Oval, Tauranga, New Zealand	24 February 2016	Lost	
148	Meg Lanning † (8/15)	127	135	10	2	94.07	2	Australia	New Zealand	Bay Oval, Tauranga, New Zealand	24 February 2016	Won	
149	Lauren Winfield † (Note: Lauren Winfield and Tammy Beaumont shared the player of the match award.)	123	117	15	2	105.12	1	England	Pakistan	New Road, Worcester, England	22 June 2016	Won	
150	Tammy Beaumont † (1/12)	104	116	10	2	89.65	1	England	Pakistan	New Road, Worcester, England	22 June 2016	Won	
151	Tammy Beaumont † (2/12)	168*	144	20	0	116.66	1	England	Pakistan	County Ground, Taunton, England	27 June 2016	Won	
152	Mignon du Preez (2/2)	116*	99	13	0	117.17	1	South Africa	Ireland	Claremont Road Cricket Ground, Dublin, Ireland	7 August 2016	Won	
153	Laura Wolvaardt (1/13)	105	125	14	0	84.00	1	South Africa	Ireland	Malahide Cricket Club Ground, Malahide, Ireland	9 August 2016	Won	
154	Nicole Bolton † (2/4)	113	146	8	1	77.39	1	Australia	Sri Lanka	R. Premadasa Stadium, Colombo, Sri Lanka	25 September 2016	Won	
155	Amy Satterthwaite † (3/7)	137*	117	16	0	117.09	1	New Zealand	Pakistan	Bert Sutcliffe Oval, Lincoln, New Zealand	11 November 2016	Won	
156	Amy Satterthwaite † (4/7)	115*	101	11	0	113.86	2	New Zealand	Pakistan	Bert Sutcliffe Oval, Lincoln, New Zealand	13 November 2016	Won	
157	Amy Satterthwaite (5/7)	123	99	18	0	124.24	2	New Zealand	Pakistan	Saxton Oval, Nelson, New Zealand	19 November 2016	Won	
158	Meg Lanning † (9/15)	134	122	20	0	109.83	1	Australia	South Africa	Manuka Oval, Canberra, Australia	20 November 2016	Won	
159	Lizelle Lee † (1/3)	102	89	6	7	114.60	1	South Africa	Australia	North Sydney Oval, Sydney, Australia	23 November 2016	Lost	
160	Thirush Kamini † (2/2)	113*	146	11	4	77.39	1	India	Ireland	Paikiasothy Saravanamuttu Stadium, Colombo, Sri Lanka	10 February 2017	Won	
161	Beth Mooney (1/6)	100	123	6	0	81.30	1	Australia	New Zealand	Eden Park Outer Oval, Auckland, New Zealand	26 February 2017	Lost	
162	Amy Satterthwaite † (6/7)	102*	113	9	0	90.26	2	New Zealand	Australia	Eden Park Outer Oval, Auckland, New Zealand	26 February 2017	Won	
163	Meg Lanning † (10/15)	104*	116	7	1	89.65	2	Australia	New Zealand	Bay Oval, Tauranga, New Zealand	5 March 2017	Won	
164	Laura Wolvaardt † (2/13)	149	149	17	0	100.00	1	South Africa	Ireland	Senwes Park, Potchefstroom, South Africa	11 May 2017	Won	
165	Deepti Sharma † (1/2)	188	160	27	2	117.50	1	India	Ireland	Senwes Park, Potchefstroom, South Africa	15 May 2017	Won	
166	Punam Raut (1/3)	109*	116	11	0	93.96	1	India	Ireland	Senwes Park, Potchefstroom, South Africa	15 May 2017	Won	
167	Andrie Steyn †	117	123	16	0	95.12	1	South Africa	Ireland	Absa Puk Oval, Potchefstroom, South Africa	19 May 2017	Won	
168	Suzie Bates (8/13)	106*	109	11	1	97.24	2	New Zealand	Sri Lanka	Bristol County Ground, Bristol, England	24 June 2017	Won	
169	Nicole Bolton † (3/4)	107*	116	14	0	92.24	2	Australia	West Indies	County Ground, Taunton, England	26 June 2017	Won	
170	Heather Knight (1/3)	106	109	12	2	97.24	1	England	Pakistan	Grace Road, Leicester, England	27 June 2017	Won	
171	Nat Sciver-Brunt † (1/10)	137	92	14	4	148.91	1	England	Pakistan	Grace Road, Leicester, England	27 June 2017	Won	
172	Smriti Mandhana † (2/14)	106*	108	13	2	98.14	2	India	West Indies	County Ground, Taunton, England	29 June 2017	Won	
173	Chamari Athapaththu † (3/9)	178*	143	22	6	124.47	1	Sri Lanka	Australia	Bristol County Ground, Bristol, England	29 June 2017	Lost	
174	Meg Lanning (11/15)	152*	135	19	1	112.59	2	Australia	Sri Lanka	Bristol County Ground, Bristol, England	29 June 2017	Won	
175	Tammy Beaumont (3/12)	148	145	22	1	102.06	1	England	South Africa	Bristol County Ground, Bristol, England	5 July 2017	Won	
176	Sarah Taylor † (6/7)	147	104	24	0	141.34	1	England	South Africa	Bristol County Ground, Bristol, England	5 July 2017	Won	
177	Deandra Dottin † (1/3)	104*	76	12	3	136.84	1	West Indies	Pakistan	Grace Road, Leicester, England	11 July 2017	Won	
178	Punam Raut (2/3)	106	136	11	0	77.94	1	India	Australia	Bristol County Ground, Bristol, England	12 July 2017	Lost	
179	Nat Sciver-Brunt † (2/10)	129	111	11	0	116.21	1	England	New Zealand	County Cricket Ground, Derby, England	12 July 2017	Won	
180	Mithali Raj † (6/7)	109	123	11	0	88.61	1	India	New Zealand	County Cricket Ground, Derby, England	15 July 2017	Won	
181	Harmanpreet Kaur † (3/8)	171*	115	20	7	148.69	1	India	Australia	County Cricket Ground, Derby, England	20 July 2017	Won	
182	Sophie Devine † (2/9)	103	119	10	0	86.55	1	New Zealand	Pakistan	Sharjah Cricket Stadium, Sharjah, United Arab Emirates	31 October 2017	Won	
183	Smriti Mandhana † (3/14)	135	129	14	1	104.65	1	India	South Africa	De Beers Diamond Oval, Kimberley, South Africa	7 February 2018	Won	
184	Sophie Devine † (3/9)	108	103	8	2	104.85	1	New Zealand	West Indies	Bert Sutcliffe Oval, Lincoln, New Zealand	4 March 2018	Won	
185	Suzie Bates † (9/13)	101*	86	13	0	117.44	2	New Zealand	West Indies	Bert Sutcliffe Oval, Lincoln, New Zealand	8 March 2018	Won	
186	Nicole Bolton † (4/4)	100*	101	12	0	99.00	2	Australia	India	IPCL Sports Complex Ground, Vadodara, India	12 March 2018	Won	
187	Alyssa Healy † (1/8)	133	115	17	2	115.65	1	Australia	India	IPCL Sports Complex Ground, Vadodara, India	18 March 2018	Won	
188	Javeria Khan † (2/2)	113*	142	15	0	79.57	1	Pakistan	Sri Lanka	Rangiri Dambulla International Stadium, Dambulla, Sri Lanka	20 March 2018	Won	
189	Suzie Bates (Note: No player of the match was awarded but Amelia Kerr was named player of the series.) (10/13)	151	94	24	2	160.63	1	New Zealand	Ireland	Claremont Road Cricket Ground, Dublin, Ireland	8 June 2018	Won	
190	Maddy Green (1/3)	122	77	15	1	158.44	1	New Zealand	Ireland	Claremont Road Cricket Ground, Dublin, Ireland	8 June 2018	Won	
191	Sophie Devine (4/9)	108	61	13	6	177.04	1	New Zealand	Ireland	The Vineyard, Dublin, Ireland	10 June 2018	Won	
192	Tammy Beaumont (4/12)	101	109	12	1	92.66	1	England	South Africa	County Cricket Ground, Hove, England	12 June 2018	Won	
193	Sarah Taylor † (7/7)	118	106	13	0	111.32	1	England	South Africa	County Cricket Ground, Hove, England	12 June 2018	Won	
194	Lizelle Lee (2/3)	117	107	13	5	109.34	2	South Africa	England	County Cricket Ground, Hove, England	12 June 2018	Lost	
195	Amelia Kerr (1/5)	232*	145	31	2	160.00	1	New Zealand	Ireland	Castle Avenue, Dublin, Ireland	13 June 2018	Won	
196	Leigh Kasperek	113	105	10	0	107.61	1	New Zealand	Ireland	Castle Avenue, Dublin, Ireland	13 June 2018	Won	
197	Tammy Beaumont † (5/12)	105	123	14	0	85.36	2	England	South Africa	St Lawrence Ground, Canterbury, England	15 June 2018	Won	
198	Sophie Devine † (5/9)	117*	116	12	2	100.86	2	New Zealand	England	Grace Road, Leicester, England	13 July 2018	Won	
199	Mithali Raj (7/7)	125*	143	14	1	87.41	1	India	Sri Lanka	FTZ Sports Complex, Katunayake, Sri Lanka	16 September 2018	Lost	
200	Chamari Athapaththu (4/9)	115	133	13	4	86.46	2	Sri Lanka	India	FTZ Sports Complex, Katunayake, Sri Lanka	16 September 2018	Won	
201	Hayley Matthews † (1/14)	117	146	17	0	80.13	1	West Indies	South Africa	Kensington Oval, Bridgetown, Barbados	22 September 2018	Won	
202	Meg Lanning † (12/15)	124	106	19	0	116.98	1	Australia	Pakistan	Kinrara Academy Oval, Bandar Kinrara, Malaysia	20 October 2018	Won	
203	Smriti Mandhana † (4/14)	105	104	9	3	100.96	2	India	New Zealand	McLean Park, Napier, New Zealand	24 January 2019	Won	
204	Dane van Niekerk †	102	117	5	1	87.17	1	South Africa	Sri Lanka	Senwes Park, Potchefstroom, South Africa	11 February 2019	Won	
205	Ellyse Perry † (1/3)	107*	110	8	3	97.27	1	Australia	New Zealand	Karen Rolton Oval, Adelaide, Australia	24 February 2019	Won	
206	Tammy Beaumont (6/12)	114	115	12	0	99.13	1	England	Australia	Grace Road, Leicester, England	4 July 2019	Lost	
207	Alyssa Healy † (2/8)	122	105	12	2	116.19	1	Australia	West Indies	Coolidge Cricket Ground, Saint George Parish, Antigua and Barbuda	5 September 2019	Won	
208	Meg Lanning (13/15)	121	146	12	4	82.87	1	Australia	West Indies	Coolidge Cricket Ground, Saint George Parish, Antigua and Barbuda	5 September 2019	Won	
209	Ellyse Perry † (2/3)	112*	118	9	0	94.91	1	Australia	West Indies	Sir Vivian Richards Stadium, North Sound, Antigua and Barbuda	8 September 2019	Won	
210	Rachael Haynes † (1/2)	118	132	8	0	89.39	1	Australia	Sri Lanka	Allan Border Field, Brisbane, Australia	7 October 2019	Won	
211	Chamari Athapaththu (5/9)	103	124	13	0	83.06	1	Sri Lanka	Australia	Allan Border Field, Brisbane, Australia	9 October 2019	Lost	
212	Alyssa Healy † (3/8)	112*	76	15	2	147.36	2	Australia	Sri Lanka	Allan Border Field, Brisbane, Australia	9 October 2019	Won	
213	Tammy Beaumont (7/12)	107	141	9	0	75.89	1	England	Pakistan	Kinrara Academy Oval, Bandar Kinrara, Malaysia	9 December 2019	Won	
214	Danni Wyatt-Hodge † (1/2)	110	95	12	3	115.79	1	England	Pakistan	Kinrara Academy Oval, Bandar Kinrara, Malaysia	9 December 2019	Won	
215	Nat Sciver-Brunt (3/10)	100*	85	12	0	117.65	1	England	Pakistan	Kinrara Academy Oval, Bandar Kinrara, Malaysia	12 December 2019	Won	
216	Meg Lanning † (14/15)	101*	96	9	3	105.21	2	Australia	New Zealand	Allan Border Field, Brisbane, Australia	5 October 2020	Won	
217	Amy Satterthwaite † (7/7)	119*	128	10	2	92.97	2	New Zealand	England	University of Otago Oval, Dunedin, New Zealand	28 February 2021	Won	
218	Lizelle Lee † (3/3)	132*	131	16	2	100.76	2	South Africa	India	Ekana Cricket Stadium, Lucknow, India	12 March 2021	Won	
219	Punam Raut (3/3)	104*	123	10	0	84.55	1	India	South Africa	Ekana Cricket Stadium, Lucknow, India	14 March 2021	Lost	
220	Stafanie Taylor † (6/10)	105*	116	11	2	90.51	2	West Indies	Pakistan	Coolidge Cricket Ground, Saint George Parish, Antigua and Barbuda	7 July 2021	Won	
221	Hayley Matthews † (2/14)	100*	121	11	0	82.64	2	West Indies	Pakistan	Sir Vivian Richards Stadium, North Sound, Antigua and Barbuda	12 July 2021	Won	
222	Heather Knight † (2/3)	101	107	10	0	94.39	2	England	New Zealand	County Cricket Ground, Derby, England	23 September 2021	Won	
223	Beth Mooney † (2/6)	125*	133	12	0	93.98	2	Australia	India	Great Barrier Reef Arena, Mackay, Australia	24 September 2021	Won	
224	Tammy Beaumont † (8/12)	102	114	11	0	89.47	1	England	New Zealand	St Lawrence Ground, Canterbury, England	26 September 2021	Won	
225	Mary-Anne Musonda †	103*	114	9	0	90.35	2	Zimbabwe	Ireland	Harare Sports Club, Harare, Zimbabwe	5 October 2021	Won	
226	Amy Hunter †	121*	127	8	0	95.27	1	Ireland	Zimbabwe	Harare Sports Club, Harare, Zimbabwe	11 October 2021	Won	
227	Deandra Dottin † (2/3)	132	146	18	2	90.41	1	West Indies	Pakistan	National Stadium, Karachi, Pakistan	8 November 2021	Won	
228	Stafanie Taylor † (7/10)	102*	117	12	0	87.17	2	West Indies	Pakistan	National Stadium, Karachi, Pakistan	14 November 2021	Won	
229	Deandra Dottin (3/3)	150*	158	18	4	94.93	1	West Indies	South Africa	Wanderers Stadium, Johannesburg, South Africa	28 January 2022	No result	
230	Laura Wolvaardt † (3/13)	117	123	11	1	95.12	1	South Africa	West Indies	Wanderers Stadium, Johannesburg, South Africa	3 February 2022	Won	
231	Suzie Bates † (11/13)	106	111	10	0	95.49	1	New Zealand	India	John Davies Oval, Queenstown, New Zealand	12 February 2022	Won	
232	Amelia Kerr † (2/5)	119*	135	7	0	88.14	2	New Zealand	India	John Davies Oval, Queenstown, New Zealand	15 February 2022	Won	
233	Hayley Matthews † (3/14)	119	128	16	1	92.96	1	West Indies	New Zealand	Bay Oval, Tauranga, New Zealand	4 March 2022	Won	
234	Sophie Devine (6/9)	108	127	10	0	85.03	2	New Zealand	West Indies	Bay Oval, Tauranga, New Zealand	4 March 2022	Lost	
235	Rachael Haynes † (2/2)	130	131	14	1	99.23	1	Australia	England	Seddon Park, Hamilton, New Zealand	5 March 2022	Won	
236	Nat Sciver-Brunt (4/10)	109*	85	13	0	128.23	2	England	Australia	Seddon Park, Hamilton, New Zealand	5 March 2022	Lost	
237	Smriti Mandhana † (5/14)	123	119	13	2	103.36	1	India	West Indies	Seddon Park, Hamilton, New Zealand	12 March 2022	Won	
238	Harmanpreet Kaur (4/8)	109	107	10	2	101.86	1	India	West Indies	Seddon Park, Hamilton, New Zealand	12 March 2022	Won	
239	Sidra Ameen (1/7)	104	140	8	0	74.28	2	Pakistan	Bangladesh	Seddon Park, Hamilton, New Zealand	14 March 2022	Lost	
240	Meg Lanning † (15/15)	135*	130	15	1	103.84	2	Australia	South Africa	Basin Reserve, Wellington, New Zealand	22 March 2022	Won	
241	Suzie Bates † (12/13)	126	135	14	0	93.33	1	New Zealand	Pakistan	Hagley Oval, Christchurch, New Zealand	26 March 2022	Won	
242	Alyssa Healy † (4/8)	129	107	17	1	120.56	1	Australia	West Indies	Basin Reserve, Wellington, New Zealand	30 March 2022	Won	
243	Danni Wyatt-Hodge † (2/2)	129	125	12	0	103.20	1	England	South Africa	Hagley Oval, Christchurch, New Zealand	31 March 2022	Won	
244	Alyssa Healy † (5/8)	170	138	26	0	123.18	1	Australia	England	Hagley Oval, Christchurch, New Zealand	3 April 2022	Won	
245	Nat Sciver-Brunt (5/10)	148*	121	15	1	122.31	2	England	Australia	Hagley Oval, Christchurch, New Zealand	3 April 2022	Lost	
246	Sidra Ameen † (2/7)	123	150	11	0	82.00	1	Pakistan	Sri Lanka	Southend Club Cricket Stadium, Karachi, Pakistan	3 June 2022	Won	
247	Chamari Athapaththu † (6/9)	101	85	13	1	118.82	1	Sri Lanka	Pakistan	Southend Club Cricket Stadium, Karachi, Pakistan	5 June 2022	Won	
248	Emma Lamb †	102	97	15	0	105.15	2	England	South Africa	County Ground, Northampton, England	11 July 2022	Won	
249	Sophia Dunkley † (1/2)	107	93	8	2	115.05	1	England	South Africa	Bristol County Ground, Bristol, England	15 July 2022	Won	
250	Tammy Beaumont † (9/12)	119	107	19	1	111.21	1	England	South Africa	Grace Road, Leicester, England	18 July 2022	Won	
251	Leah Paul	137	138	15	0	99.27	1	Ireland	Netherlands	VRA Cricket Ground, Amstelveen, Netherlands	24 August 2022	Won	
252	Laura Delany	109	102	9	0	106.86	1	Ireland	Netherlands	VRA Cricket Ground, Amstelveen, Netherlands	24 August 2022	Won	
253	Harmanpreet Kaur † (5/8)	143*	111	18	4	128.82	1	India	England	St Lawrence Ground, Canterbury, England	21 September 2022	Won	
254	Muneeba Ali	107	114	10	2	93.85	1	Pakistan	Ireland	Gaddafi Stadium, Lahore, Pakistan	4 November 2022	Won	
255	Sidra Ameen † (3/7)	176*	151	20	1	116.55	1	Pakistan	Ireland	Gaddafi Stadium, Lahore, Pakistan	4 November 2022	Won	
256	Natthakan Chantam †	102	135	8	1	75.55	1	Thailand	Netherlands	Royal Chiangmai Golf Club, Mae Faek, Thailand	20 November 2022	Won	
257	Hayley Matthews † (4/14)	109	106	10	2	102.83	1	West Indies	Ireland	Daren Sammy Cricket Ground, Gros Islet	26 June 2023	Won	
258	Beth Mooney † (3/6)	133	105	14	4	126.66	1	Australia	Pakistan	North Sydney Oval, Sydney, Australia	21 January 2023	Won	
259	Chamari Athapaththu† (7/9)	108*	83	10	5	130.12	2	Sri Lanka	New Zealand	Galle International Stadium, Galle, Sri Lanka	27 June 2023	Won	
260	Amelia Kerr † (3/5)	108	106	7	1	101.88	1	New Zealand	Sri Lanka	Galle International Stadium, Galle, Sri Lanka	30 June 2023	Won	
261	Sophie Devine † (7/9)	137	121	17	2	101.88	1	New Zealand	Sri Lanka	Galle International Stadium, Galle, Sri Lanka	30 June 2023	Won	
262	Chamari Athapaththu † (8/9)	140*	80	13	9	175.00	2	Sri Lanka	New Zealand	Galle International Stadium, Galle, Sri Lanka	3 July 2023	Won	
263	Nat Sciver-Brunt † (6/10)	111*	99	10	0	112.12	2	England	Australia	Rose Bowl, Southampton, England	16 July 2023	Won	
264	Nat Sciver-Brunt † (7/10)	129	149	15	1	86.57	2	England	Australia	County Ground, Taunton, England	18 July 2023	Won	
265	Fargana Hoque † (1/2)	107	160	7	0	66.87	1	Bangladesh	India	Sher-e-Bangla National Cricket Stadium، Mirpur, Bangladesh	22 July 2023	Tied	
266	Phoebe Litchfield † (1/3)	106*	114	14	0	92.98	2	Australia	Ireland	Castle Avenue, Dublin, Ireland	28 July 2023	Won	
267	Annabel Sutherland (1/3)	109*	101	11	0	107.92	2	Australia	Ireland	Castle Avenue, Dublin, Ireland	28 July 2023	Won	
268	Suné Luus (1/2)	107*	129	7	0	82.94	2	South Africa	Pakistan	National Stadium, Karachi, Pakistan	8 September 2023	Won	
269	Marizanne Kapp † (2/4)	100	105	12	1	95.23	2	South Africa	Pakistan	National Stadium, Karachi, Pakistan	8 September 2023	Won	
270	Nat Sciver-Brunt † (8/10)	120	74	18	1	162.16	1	England	Sri Lanka	Grace Road, Leicester, England	14 September 2023	Won	
271	Laura Wolvaardt † (4/13)	124 *	141	15	0	87.94	1	South Africa	New Zealand	City Oval, Pietermaritzburg, South Africa	28 September 2023	Won	
272	Amelia Kerr † (4/5)	100 *	117	13	0	85.47	2	New Zealand	South Africa	Kingsmead Cricket Ground, Durban, South Africa	1 October 2023	Won	
273	Suzie Bates † (13/13)	108	104	11	0	103.84	1	New Zealand	Pakistan	John Davies Oval, Queenstown, New Zealand	12 December 2023	Won	
274	Sidra Ameen (4/7)	105	117	12	0	89.74	2	Pakistan	New Zealand	John Davies Oval, Queenstown, New Zealand	12 December 2023	Lost	
275	Fargana Hoque (2/2)	102	167	11	0	61.07	1	Bangladesh	South Africa	JB Marks Oval, Potchefstroom, South Africa	20 December 2023	Lost	
276	Laura Wolvaardt (5/13)	126	134	13	1	94.02	1	South Africa	Bangladesh	Willowmoore Park, Benoni, South Africa	23 December 2023	Won	
277	Tazmin Brits † (1/7)	118	124	8	2	95.16	1	South Africa	Bangladesh	Willowmoore Park, Benoni, South Africa	23 December 2023	Won	
278	Phoebe Litchfield † (2/3)	119	125	16	1	95.20	1	Australia	India	Wankhede Stadium, Mumbai, India	2 January 2024	Won	
279	Sophie Devine † (8/9)	100*	93	11	4	107.52	2	New Zealand	England	Seddon Park, Hamilton, New Zealand	7 April 2024	Won	
280	Tazmin Brits (2/7)	116	128	12	0	90.62	1	South Africa	Sri Lanka	Buffalo Park, East London, South Africa	9 April 2024	No result	
281	Laura Wolvaardt † (6/13)	110*	141	6	0	78.01	2	South Africa	Sri Lanka	De Beers Diamond Oval, Kimberley, South Africa	13 April 2024	Won	
282	Laura Wolvaardt (7/13)	184*	147	23	4	125.17	1	South Africa	Sri Lanka	JB Marks Oval, Potchefstroom, South Africa	17 April 2024	Lost	
283	Chamari Athapaththu † (9/9)	195*	139	26	5	140.28	2	Sri Lanka	South Africa	JB Marks Oval, Potchefstroom, South Africa	17 April 2024	Won	
284	Hayley Matthews † (5/14)	140*	150	15	1	93.33	1	West Indies	Pakistan	National Stadium, Karachi, Pakistan	18 April 2024	Won	
285	Hayley Matthews † (6/14)	141	149	19	0	94.63	1	West Indies	Pakistan	National Stadium, Karachi, Pakistan	23 April 2024	Won	
286	Nat Sciver-Brunt † (9/10)	124*	117	14	2	105.98	1	England	Pakistan	County Cricket Ground, Chelmsford, England	29 May 2024	Won	
287	Smriti Mandhana † (6/14)	117	127	12	1	92.12	1	India	South Africa	M. Chinnaswamy Stadium, Bengaluru, India	16 June 2024	Won	
288	Smriti Mandhana (7/14)	136	120	18	2	133.33	1	India	South Africa	M. Chinnaswamy Stadium, Bengaluru, India	19 June 2024	Won	
289	Harmanpreet Kaur † (6/8)	103*	88	9	3	117.04	1	India	South Africa	M. Chinnaswamy Stadium, Bengaluru, India	19 June 2024	Won	
290	Laura Wolvaardt (8/13)	135*	135	12	3	100.00	2	South Africa	India	M. Chinnaswamy Stadium, Bengaluru, India	19 June 2024	Lost	
291	Marizanne Kapp (3/4)	114	94	11	3	121.27	2	South Africa	India	M. Chinnaswamy Stadium, Bengaluru, India	19 June 2024	Lost	
292	Maia Bouchier †	100*	88	17	0	113.63	2	England	New Zealand	New Road, Worcester, England	30 June 2024	Won	
293	Saskia Horley †	100	121	12	0	82.64	1	Scotland	Papua New Guinea	Sportpark Maarschalkerweerd, Utrecht, Netherlands	6 August 2024	Won	
294	Vishmi Gunaratne (1/2)	101	98	9	3	103.06	1	Sri Lanka	Ireland	Stormont, Belfast, Northern Ireland	16 August 2024	Lost	
295	Orla Prendergast †	122*	111	10	2	109.90	2	Ireland	Sri Lanka	Stormont, Belfast, Northern Ireland	16 August 2024	Won	
296	Harshitha Samarawickrama (1/2)	105	124	11	0	84.67	2	Sri Lanka	Ireland	Stormont, Belfast, Northern Ireland	18 August 2024	Lost	
297	Tammy Beaumont † (10/12)	150*	139	16	1	107.91	1	England	Ireland	Stormont, Belfast, Northern Ireland	9 September 2024	Won	
298	Chetna Pagydyala †	136*	152	18	0	89.47	2	United States	Zimbabwe	Harare Sports Club, Harare, Zimbabwe	28 October 2024	Won	
299	Smriti Mandhana † (8/14)	100	122	10	0	81.96	2	India	New Zealand	Narendra Modi Stadium, Ahmedabad, India	29 October 2024	Won	
300	Georgia Voll (1/3)	101	87	12	0	116.09	1	Australia	India	Allan Border Field, Brisbane, Australia	8 December 2024	Won	
301	Ellyse Perry † (3/3)	105	75	7	6	140.00	1	Australia	India	Allan Border Field, Brisbane, Australia	8 December 2024	Won	
302	Annabel Sutherland † (2/3)	110	95	9	4	115.78	1	Australia	India	WACA Ground, Perth, Australia	11 December 2024	Won	
303	Smriti Mandhana (9/14)	105	109	14	1	96.33	2	India	Australia	WACA Ground, Perth, Australia	11 December 2024	Lost	
304	Annabel Sutherland † (3/3)	105*	81	11	2	129.62	1	Australia	New Zealand	Basin Reserve, Wellington, New Zealand	21 December 2024	Won	
305	Harleen Deol †	115	103	16	0	111.65	1	India	West Indies	Kotambi Stadium, Vadodara, India	24 December 2024	Won	
306	Hayley Matthews (7/14)	106	109	13	0	97.24	2	West Indies	India	Kotambi Stadium, Vadodara, India	24 December 2024	Lost	
307	Jemimah Rodrigues † (1/3)	102	91	12	0	112.08	1	India	Ireland	Niranjan Shah Stadium, Rajkot, India	12 January 2025	Won	
308	Smriti Mandhana (10/14)	135	80	12	7	168.75	1	India	Ireland	Niranjan Shah Stadium, Rajkot, India	15 January 2025	Won	
309	Pratika Rawal † (1/3)	154	129	20	1	119.37	1	India	Ireland	Niranjan Shah Stadium, Rajkot, India	15 January 2025	Won	
310	Ashleigh Gardner † (1/3)	102	102	8	1	100.00	1	Australia	England	Bellerive Oval, Hobart, Australia	17 January 2025	Won	
311	Hayley Matthews † (8/14)	104*	93	16	0	111.82	2	West Indies	Bangladesh	Warner Park Sporting Complex, Basseterre, Saint Kitts and Nevis	19 January 2025	Won	
312	Maddy Green † (2/3)	100	109	7	0	91.74	1	New Zealand	Sri Lanka	Saxton Oval, Nelson, New Zealand	7 March 2025	Won	
313	Georgia Plimmer †	112	120	8	2	93.33	1	New Zealand	Sri Lanka	Saxton Oval, Nelson, New Zealand	9 March 2025	Won	
314	Hayley Matthews † (9/14)	114*	113	14	0	100.88	2	West Indies	Scotland	Lahore City Cricket Association Ground, Lahore, Pakistan	9 April 2025	Lost	
315	Nigar Sultana †	101	80	15	1	126.25	1	Bangladesh	Thailand	Lahore City Cricket Association Ground, Lahore, Pakistan	10 April 2025	Won	
316	Kathryn Bryce	131*	137	14	2	95.62	1	Scotland	Ireland	Gaddafi Stadium, Lahore, Pakistan	18 April 2025	Lost	
317	Tazmin Brits (3/7)	109	107	13	3	101.86	2	South Africa	India	R. Premadasa Stadium, Colombo, Sri Lanka	29 April 2025	Lost	
318	Loreen Tshuma †	137	149	17	0	91.94	1	Zimbabwe	United States	Grand Prairie Stadium, Dallas, United States	3 May 2025	Won	
319	Jemimah Rodrigues † (2/3)	123	101	15	1	121.78	1	India	South Africa	R. Premadasa Stadium, Colombo, India	7 May 2025	Won	
320	Annerie Dercksen	104	84	9	5	123.80	1	South Africa	Sri Lanka	R. Premadasa Stadium, Colombo, India	9 May 2025	Won	
321	Smriti Mandhana † (11/14)	116	101	15	2	114.85	1	India	Sri Lanka	R. Premadasa Stadium, Colombo, India	11 May 2025	Won	
322	Tammy Beaumont (11/12)	107	104	8	4	102.88	1	England	West Indies	County Cricket Ground, Derby, England	30 May 2025	Won	
323	Amy Jones † (1/2)	122	121	15	1	100.82	1	England	West Indies	County Cricket Ground, Derby, England	30 May 2025	Won	
324	Amy Jones † (2/2)	129	98	20	0	131.63	1	England	West Indies	Grace Road, Leicester, England	4 June 2025	Won	
325	Tammy Beaumont (12/12)	106	109	12	1	97.24	1	England	West Indies	Grace Road, Leicester, England	4 June 2025	Won	
326	Tazmin Brits † (4/7)	101	91	8	4	110.98	1	South Africa	West Indies	Three Ws Oval, Bridgetown, Barbados	17 June 2025	Won	
327	Harmanpreet Kaur † (7/8)	102	84	14	0	121.42	1	India	England	Riverside Ground, Chester-le-Street, England	22 July 2025	Won	
328	Sidra Ameen (5/7)	121*	150	12	0	80.66	1	Pakistan	South Africa	Gaddafi Stadium, Lahore, Pakistan	16 September 2025	Lost	
329	Tazmin Brits (5/7)	101*	121	9	0	83.47	2	South Africa	Pakistan	Gaddafi Stadium, Lahore, Pakistan	16 September 2025	Won	
330	Marizanne Kapp † (4/4)	121*	128	13	2	94.53	2	South Africa	Pakistan	Gaddafi Stadium, Lahore, Pakistan	16 September 2025	Won	
331	Smriti Mandhana † (12/14)	117	91	14	4	128.57	1	India	Australia	Maharaja Yadavindra Singh International Cricket Stadium, Mullanpur, India	17 September 2025	Won	
332	Tazmin Brits † (6/7)	171*	141	20	4	121.27	1	South Africa	Pakistan	Gaddafi Stadium, Lahore, Pakistan	19 September 2025	Won	
333	Laura Wolvaardt (9/13)	100	129	10	0	77.51	1	South Africa	Pakistan	Gaddafi Stadium, Lahore, Pakistan	19 September 2025	Won	
334	Sidra Ameen (6/7)	122	110	13	0	110.90	2	Pakistan	South Africa	Gaddafi Stadium, Lahore, Pakistan	19 September 2025	Lost	
335	Beth Mooney † (4/6)	138	75	23	1	184.00	1	Australia	India	Arun Jaitley Cricket Stadium, New Delhi, India	20 September 2025	Won	
336	Smriti Mandhana (13/14)	125	63	17	5	198.41	2	India	Australia	Arun Jaitley Cricket Stadium, New Delhi, India	20 September 2025	Lost	
337	Ashleigh Gardner † (2/3)	115	83	16	1	138.55	1	Australia	New Zealand	Holkar Stadium, Indore, India	1 October 2025	Won	
338	Sophie Devine (9/9)	111	112	12	3	99.11	2	New Zealand	Australia	Holkar Stadium, Indore, India	1 October 2025	Lost	
339	Tazmin Brits † (7/7)	101	89	15	1	113.48	2	South Africa	New Zealand	Holkar Stadium, Indore, India	6 October 2025	Won	
340	Beth Mooney † (5/6)	109	114	11	0	95.61	1	Australia	Pakistan	R. Premadasa Stadium, Colombo, Sri Lanka	8 October 2025	Won	
341	Nat Sciver-Brunt † (10/10)	117	117	9	2	100.00	1	England	Sri Lanka	Assam Cricket Association Stadium, Guwahati, India	11 October 2025	Won	
342	Alyssa Healy † (6/8)	142	107	21	3	132.71	2	Australia	India	ACA–VDCA Cricket Stadium, Visakhapatnam, India	12 October 2025	Won	
343	Alyssa Healy (7/8)	113*	77	20	0	146.75	2	Australia	Bangladesh	ACA–VDCA Cricket Stadium, Visakhapatnam, India	16 October 2025	Won	
344	Heather Knight † (3/3)	109	91	15	1	119.78	1	England	India	Holkar Stadium, Indore, India	19 October 2025	Won	
345	Ashleigh Gardner (3/3)	104*	87	16	0	142.46	2	Australia	England	Holkar Stadium, Indore, India	22 October 2025	Won	
346	Pratika Rawal (2/3)	122	134	13	2	91.04	1	India	New Zealand	DY Patil Stadium, Navi Mumbai, India	23 October 2025	Won	
347	Smriti Mandhana † (14/14)	109	95	10	4	114.73	1	India	New Zealand	DY Patil Stadium, Navi Mumbai, India	23 October 2025	Won	
348	Laura Wolvaardt † (10/13)	169	143	20	4	118.18	1	South Africa	England	Assam Cricket Association Stadium, Guwahati, India	29 October 2025	Won	
349	Phoebe Litchfield (3/3)	119	93	17	3	127.95	1	Australia	India	DY Patil Stadium, Navi Mumbai, India	30 October 2025	Lost	
350	Jemimah Rodrigues † (3/3)	127*	134	14	0	94.77	2	India	Australia	DY Patil Stadium, Navi Mumbai, India	30 October 2025	Won	
351	Laura Wolvaardt (11/13)	101	98	11	1	103.06	2	South Africa	India	DY Patil Stadium, Navi Mumbai, India	2 November 2025	Lost	
352	Laura Wolvaardt † (12/13)	124	111	19	0	111.71	1	South Africa	Ireland	St George's Park, Gqeberha, South Africa	16 December 2025	Won	
353	Suné Luus (2/2)	114	113	13	1	100.88	1	South Africa	Ireland	St George's Park, Gqeberha, South Africa	16 December 2025	Won	
354	Laura Wolvaardt † (13/13)	100*	93	16	0	107.53	2	South Africa	Ireland	Wanderers Stadium, Johannesburg, South Africa	19 December 2025	Won	
355	Hayley Matthews † (10/14)	100	119	13	1	84.03	2	West Indies	Sri Lanka	National Cricket Stadium, St. George's, Grenada	25 February 2026	Won	
356	Georgia Voll † (2/3)	101	82	13	1	123.17	2	Australia	India	Bellerive Oval, Hobart, Australia	27 February 2026	Won	
357	Alyssa Healy † (8/8)	158	98	27	2	161.22	1	Australia	India	Bellerive Oval, Hobart, Australia	1 March 2026	Won	
358	Beth Mooney (6/6)	106*	84	10	1	126.19	1	Australia	India	Bellerive Oval, Hobart, Australia	1 March 2026	Won	
359	Brooke Halliday †	157*	118	24	1	133.05	1	New Zealand	Zimbabwe	University of Otago Oval, Dunedin, New Zealand	5 March 2026	Won	
360	Stafanie Taylor (8/10)	105*	129	10	1	81.39	2	West Indies	Australia	Warner Park Sporting Complex, Basseterre, Saint Kitts and Nevis	27 March 2026	Lost	
361	Amelia Kerr † (5/5)	179*	139	23	1	128.77	2	New Zealand	South Africa	Basin Reserve, Wellington, New Zealand	1 April 2026	Won	
362	Maddy Green † (3/3)	141*	128	15	0	110.15	1	New Zealand	South Africa	Basin Reserve, Wellington, New Zealand	4 April 2026	Won	
363	Sadaf Shamas	101	112	10	1	90.17	1	Pakistan	Zimbabwe	National Stadium, Karachi, Pakistan	6 May 2026	Won	
364	Gull Feroza † (1/2)	100	95	13	0	105.26	1	Pakistan	Zimbabwe	National Stadium, Karachi, Pakistan	6 May 2026	Won	
365	Gull Feroza † (2/2)	106*	92	16	0	115.21	2	Pakistan	Zimbabwe	National Stadium, Karachi, Pakistan	9 May 2026	Won	
366	Hayley Matthews † (11/14)	159*	124	24	2	129.26	2	West Indies	Ireland	Bready Cricket Club Ground, Magheramason, Ireland	10 July 2026	Won	
367	Hayley Matthews † (12/14)	100	94	14	2	106.38	2	West Indies	Ireland	Bready Cricket Club Ground, Magheramason, Ireland	12 July 2026	Won	
368	Stafanie Taylor (9/10)	100*	105	14	1	95.23	2	West Indies	Ireland	Bready Cricket Club Ground, Magheramason, Ireland	12 July 2026	Won	
369	Stafanie Taylor † (10/10)	105	113	10	0	92.92	1	West Indies	Ireland	Bready Cricket Club Ground, Magheramason, Ireland	15 July 2026	Won	
370	Sidra Ameen (7/7)	100*	120	13	0	83.33	1	Pakistan	Sri Lanka	Mahinda Rajapaksa International Cricket Stadium, Hambantota, Sri Lanka	25 July 2026	Lost	
371	Vishmi Gunaratne † (2/2)	123	123	11	1	100.00	2	Sri Lanka	Pakistan	Mahinda Rajapaksa International Cricket Stadium, Hambantota, Sri Lanka	25 July 2026	Won	
372	Harshitha Samarawickrama (2/2)	100*	119	9	0	84.03	2	Sri Lanka	Pakistan	Mahinda Rajapaksa International Cricket Stadium, Hambantota, Sri Lanka	25 July 2026	Won	
373	Phebe Molkenboer	106	144	9	0	73.61	1	Netherlands	Scotland	Titwood, Glasgow, Scotland	28 August 2026	Won	
374	Maia Bouchier † (2/2)	104	95	11	0	109.47	2	England	Ireland	Grace Road, Leicester, England	1 September 2026	Won	
375	Sophia Dunkley † (2/2)	119	119	15	0	100.00	1	England	Ireland	New Road, Worcester, England	6 September 2026	Won	
376	Hayley Matthews † (13/14)	182	156	26	2	116.66	1	West Indies	Zimbabwe	Harare Sports Club, Harare, Zimbabwe	24 September 2026	Won	
377	Hayley Matthews † (14/14)	118	113	18	1	104.42	1	West Indies	Zimbabwe	Harare Sports Club, Harare, Zimbabwe	30 September 2026	Won	
378	Sobhana Mostary	118	134	18	0	88.05	1	Bangladesh	Australia	Allan Border Field, Brisbane, Australia	11 October 2026	Lost	
379	Georgia Voll † (3/3)	131*	97	19	0	135.05	2	Australia	Bangladesh	Allan Border Field, Brisbane, Australia	11 October 2026	Won	
380	Pratika Rawal † (3/3)	100*	96	15	0	104.16	2	India	Zimbabwe	Baroda Cricket Association Stadium, Vadodara, India	23 October 2026	Won	
381	Harmanpreet Kaur † (8/8)	126	121	15	0	104.13	1	India	Zimbabwe	Baroda Cricket Association Stadium, Vadodara, India	25 October 2026	Won	
382	Deepti Sharma (2/2)	106*	86	15	0	123.25	1	India	Zimbabwe	Baroda Cricket Association Stadium, Vadodara, India	25 October 2026	Won	
