= Thinus Fourie =

Irish cricketer (born 1979)

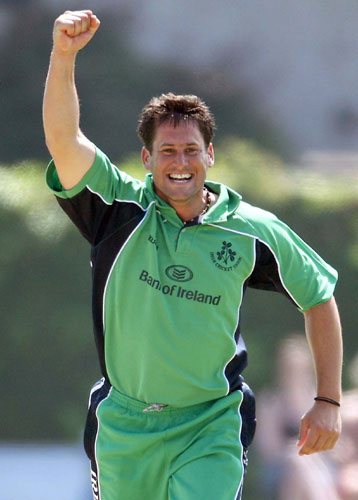

Personal information
- Full name: Marthinus Jacobus Fourie
- Born: 23 July 1979 (age 47); Cape Town, Cape Province, South Africa
- Batting: Right-handed
- Bowling: Right-arm medium-fast

International information
- National side: Ireland
- ODI debut (cap 17): 23 June 2007 v India
- Last ODI: 31 July 2008 v Scotland

Career statistics
Competition	ODI	FC	LA	T20
Matches	7	3	17	1
Runs scored	42	6	132	1
Batting average	21.00	6.00	16.50	1.00
100s/50s	0/0	0/0	0/0	0/0
Top score	19*	6*	30	1
Balls bowled	179	330	653	18
Wickets	1	6	12	1
Bowling average	128.00	32.83	39.91	16.00
5 wickets in innings	0	0	0	0
10 wickets in match	0	0	0	0
Best bowling	1/33	3/31	3/41	1/16
Catches/stumpings	0/–	3/–	2/–	0/–
- Source: CricketArchive, 6 August 2009

Marthinus Jacobus Fourie (born 23 July 1979) is a South African-born Irish former cricketer. He is a right-handed batsman and a right-arm medium-pace bowler. He has played in the Ireland A cricket team since 2004, when he played for the first time against Marylebone Cricket Club. He also participated in the EurAsia Cricket Series of 2006.

Fourie is a middle order batsman and a decently paced bowler in the Irish attack.

He currently coaches cricket at Gonzaga College.
