= Marijke Overhoff =

Dutch cricketer (born 1980)

Personal information
- Full name: Anna Marijke Overhoff
- Born: 12 June 1980 (age 46); The Hague, Netherlands
- Batting: Right-handed

International information
- National side: Netherlands (2006)
- Only ODI (cap 69): 22 August 2006 v Ireland

Career statistics
Competition	WODI
Matches	1
Runs scored	9
Batting average	9.00
100s/50s	0/0
Top score	9
Catches/stumpings	0/0
- Source: Cricinfo, 6 December 2017

Anna Marijke Overhoff (born 12 June 1980) is a Dutch woman cricketer. She made her WODI debut in her only international appearance in 2006 against Ireland.
