= Roger Whelan =

Irish cricketer (born 1980)

Personal information
- Full name: Roger Kyran Whelan
- Born: 27 July 1980 (age 46); Dublin, Ireland
- Batting: Right-handed
- Bowling: Right-arm fast-medium
- Relatives: Heather Whelan (sister); Jill Whelan (sister)

International information
- National side: Ireland
- ODI debut (cap 18): 23 June 2007 v India
- Last ODI: 24 June 2007 v South Africa

Domestic team information
- Years: Team
- 2007: Ireland

Career statistics
Competition	ODI	LA
Matches	2	6
Runs scored	5	27
Batting average	2.50	6.75
100s/50s	–/–	–/–
Top score	5	19*
Balls bowled	90	246
Wickets	2	4
Bowling average	49.50	60.00
5 wickets in innings	–	–
10 wickets in match	–	–
Best bowling	1/43	1/27
Catches/stumpings	–/–	2/–
- Source: CricketArchive, 22 January 2011

Roger Whelan (born 27 July 1980) is a former Irish cricketer. He is a right-handed batsman and a right-arm medium-fast bowler who has played with Ireland's cricket team since the Eurasia cricket series of 2006.

Whelan is a lower-order batsman. His sisters, Heather and Jill Whelan, play for the Irish ladies team.

Whelan notably took the wicket of Indian legend Sachin Tendulkar on his debut 23 June 2007 at Belfast's Stormont Ground.

On 17 November 2007, Whelan announced his retirement from all forms of cricket to concentrate on his future with his band, The RoJ LiGht.
