= Suzanne Kenealy =

Irish cricketer (born 1981)

Personal information
- Full name: Suzanne Elizabeth Kenealy
- Born: 27 November 1981 (age 44); Dublin, Ireland
- Batting: Right-handed
- Bowling: Right-arm medium
- Role: Bowler
- Relatives: Amy Kenealy (sister)

International information
- National side: Ireland (2008–2010)
- ODI debut (cap 59): 31 July 2008 v South Africa
- Last ODI: 9 October 2010 v South Africa
- T20I debut (cap 13): 25 May 2009 v Pakistan
- Last T20I: 16 October 2010 v Netherlands

Career statistics
Competition	WODI	WT20I	WLA
Matches	4	5	9
Runs scored	5	2	24
Batting average	2.50	2.00	6.00
100s/50s	0/0	0/0	0/0
Top score	4	2	19*
Balls bowled	84	66	336
Wickets	0	1	9
Bowling average	–	85.00	21.11
5 wickets in innings	0	0	0
10 wickets in match	0	0	0
Best bowling	–	1/14	3/8
Catches/stumpings	0/–	0/–	0/–
- Source: CricketArchive, 2 June 2021

Suzanne Elizabeth Kenealy (born 27 November 1981) is an Irish former cricketer who played as a right-arm medium bowler. She appeared in 4 One Day Internationals and 5 Twenty20 Internationals for Ireland between 2008 and 2010. Her sister, Amy, also played for Ireland.
