= Nazia Sadiq =

Pakistani cricketer (born 1976)

Personal information
- Full name: Nazia Sadiq
- Born: 7 August 1976 (age 50)
- Batting: Right-handed
- Role: Batter; occasional wicket-keeper

International information
- National side: Pakistan (1997–2009)
- Only Test (cap 10): 17 April 1998 v Sri Lanka
- ODI debut (cap 15): 10 December 1997 v Denmark
- Last ODI: 26 May 2009 v Ireland
- T20I debut (cap 7): 25 May 2009 v Ireland
- Last T20I: 29 May 2009 v Ireland

Domestic team information
- Years: Team
- 2005/06–2007/08: Lahore
- 2009/10: Zarai Taraqiati Bank Limited
- 2010/11: Lahore

Career statistics
Competition	WTest	WODI	WT20I	WLA
Matches	1	9	3	31
Runs scored	13	78	34	218
Batting average	6.50	9.75	11.33	8.38
100s/50s	0/0	0/0	0/0	0/0
Top score	13	37	23	37
Catches/stumpings	2/–	1/–	0/–	13/6
- Source: CricketArchive, 12 December 2021

Nazia Sadiq (born 7 August 1976) is a Pakistani former cricketer who played as a right-handed batter and occasional wicket-keeper. She appeared in one Test match, nine One Day Internationals and three Twenty20 Internationals for Pakistan from December 1997 to May 2009. She played domestic cricket for Lahore and Zarai Taraqiati Bank Limited.

She holds the record for the longest interval between appearances in WODI history, at 11 years and 41 days, setting the record when she returned to play in 2009 against Ireland, with her previous appearance in national colours being in 1998.
