= Jean Carroll (cricketer) =

Irish cricketer

Personal information
- Full name: Jean Christine Carroll
- Born: 19 June 1980 (age 46); Dublin, Ireland
- Batting: Right-handed
- Role: Wicket-keeper

International information
- National side: Ireland (2007–2009)
- ODI debut (cap 55): 17 August 2007 v Netherlands
- Last ODI: 26 May 2009 v Pakistan
- T20I debut (cap 2): 27 June 2008 v West Indies
- Last T20I: 29 May 2009 v Pakistan

Career statistics
Competition	WODI	WT20I	WLA	WT20
Matches	8	5	13	6
Runs scored	6	2	6	2
Batting average	1.20	–	0.85	–
100s/50s	0/0	0/0	0/0	0/0
Top score	4*	2*	4*	2*
Catches/stumpings	3/7	0/0	5/8	0/0
- Source: CricketArchive, 2 June 2021

Jean Christine Carroll (born 19 June 1980) is an Irish former cricketer who played as a wicket-keeper. She appeared in eight One Day Internationals and five Twenty20 Internationals for Ireland between 2007 and 2009.
