= Sinovich Park =

Cricket ground

Ground information
- Location: Sinoville, Pretoria, South Africa
- Tenants: Northerns Women's, South Africa women's cricket team

International information
- First WODI: 24 January 2007: South Africa v Pakistan
- Last WODI: 28 January 2007: South Africa v Pakistan

Team information
Northerns Women's	(2010-present)
- As of 2 September 2020; Source: CricketArchive

Sinovich Park is a cricket ground in Sinoville, Pretoria, South Africa. The ground has hosted a number of youth and women's international matches, including three One Day Internationals on the Pakistan women's team's tour of South Africa in 2006–07. It was also the venue for an under-19s triangular tournament involving South Africa, India and Bangladesh in 2007–08. The only first-class match to have been played at the ground was the Netherlands' seven-wicket victory over Canada in the 2006 ICC Intercontinental Cup. Since 2010, the ground has hosted some of the Northerns Women's home matches in the South African Women's Provincial League.
