= Heather Whelan =

Irish cricketer (born 1977)

Personal information
- Full name: Heather Elizabeth Whelan
- Born: 8 October 1977 (age 49); Dublin, Ireland
- Batting: Right-handed
- Bowling: Right-arm medium-fast
- Role: Bowler
- Relatives: Roger Whelan (brother); Jill Whelan (sister)

International information
- National side: Ireland (1997–2010)
- ODI debut (cap 37): 12 December 1997 v Denmark
- Last ODI: 11 August 2010 v Netherlands
- T20I debut (cap 14): 25 May 2009 v Pakistan
- Last T20I: 6 August 2009 v Netherlands

Career statistics
Competition	WODI	WT20I	WLA	WT20
Matches	39	4	50	6
Runs scored	102	1	145	1
Batting average	5.66	1.00	6.30	1.00
100s/50s	0/0	0/0	0/0	0/0
Top score	13	1	16	1
Balls bowled	1,847	78	2,408	126
Wickets	31	6	46	6
Bowling average	38.61	6.66	33.15	12.00
5 wickets in innings	0	0	0	0
10 wickets in match	0	0	0	0
Best bowling	3/14	3/11	3/14	3/11
Catches/stumpings	5/–	0/–	5/–	0/–
- Source: CricketArchive, 2 June 2021

Heather Elizabeth Whelan (born 8 October 1977) is an Irish former cricketer who played as a right-arm medium-fast bowler. She appeared in 39 One Day Internationals and 4 Twenty20 Internationals for Ireland between 1997 and 2010, and captained the side between 2005 and 2010. Her siblings Roger and Jill both also represented Ireland in international cricket.
