= Urooj Mumtaz =

Pakistani cricketer and commentator

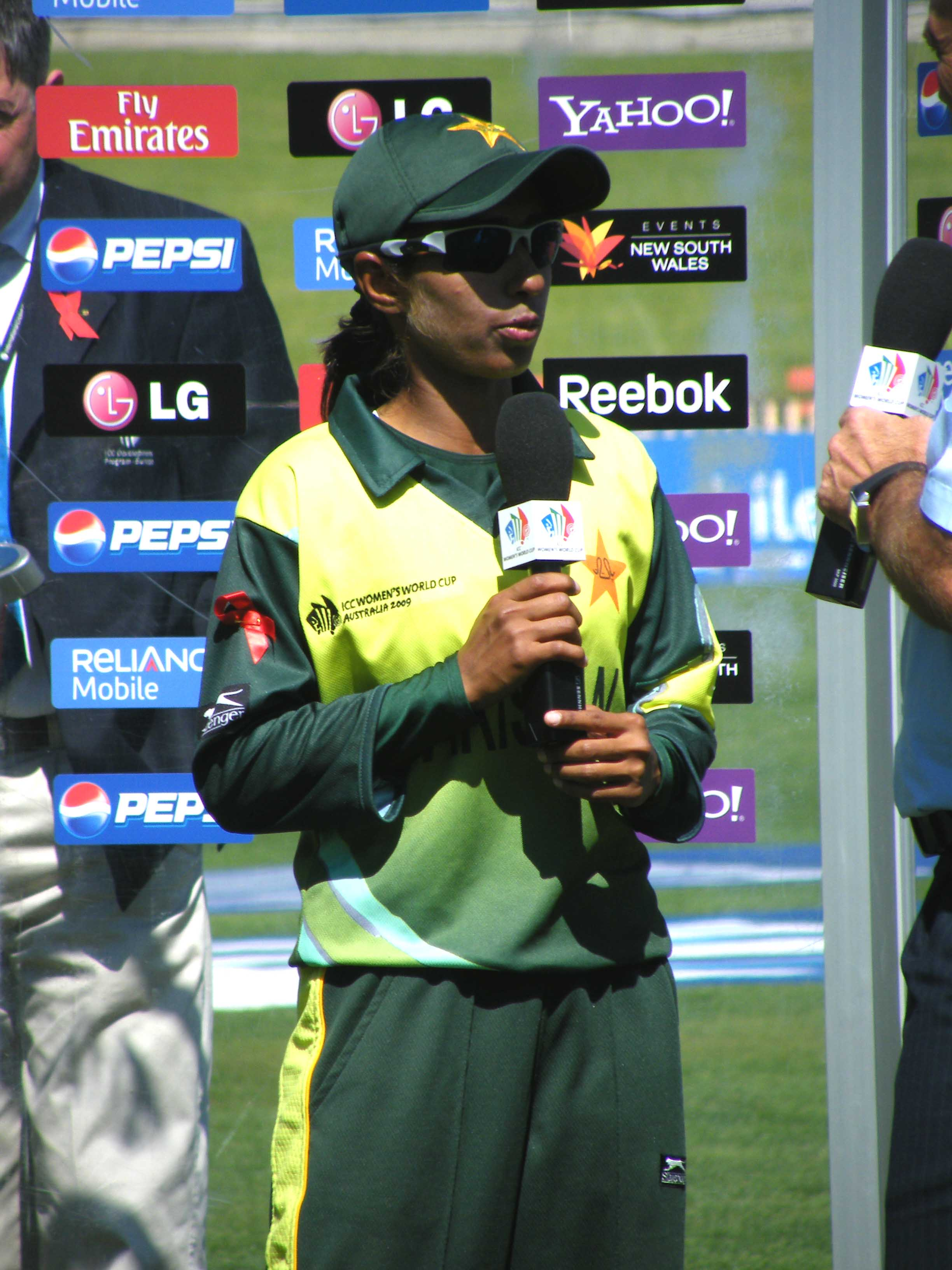
- Urooj Mumtaz in 2009

Personal information
- Full name: Urooj Mumtaz Khan
- Born: 1 October 1985 (age 41); Karachi, Pakistan
- Batting: Right-handed
- Bowling: Right-arm leg break
- Role: All-rounder

International information
- National side: Pakistan (2004–2010)
- Only Test (cap 20): 15 March 2004 v West Indies
- ODI debut (cap 36): 21 March 2004 v West Indies
- Last ODI: 26 May 2010 v Ireland
- T20I debut (cap 11): 25 May 2009 v Ireland
- Last T20I: 10 May 2010 v New Zealand

Domestic team information
- Years: Team
- 2005/06: Karachi
- 2009/10: Zarai Taraqiati Bank Limited

Career statistics
| Competition | WTest | WODI | WT20I | WLA |
|---|---|---|---|---|
| Matches | 1 | 38 | 9 | 54 |
| Runs scored | 0 | 502 | 87 | 784 |
| Batting average | 0.00 | 14.34 | 13.42 | 16.33 |
| 100s/50s | 0/0 | 0/1 | 0/0 | 0/3 |
| Top score | 0 | 57 | 26* | 60 |
| Balls bowled | 198 | 1,085 | 177 | 1,531 |
| Wickets | 2 | 36 | 6 | 55 |
| Bowling average | 48.50 | 24.38 | 21.16 | 21.56 |
| 5 wickets in innings | 0 | 2 | 0 | 3 |
| 10 wickets in match | 0 | 0 | 0 | 0 |
| Best bowling | 1/24 | 5/33 | 2/14 | 5/20 |
| Catches/stumpings | 3/– | 13/– | 3/– | 21/– |
- Source: CricketArchive, 10 December 2021

Urooj Mumtaz Khan (Urdu: عروج ممتاز) (born 1 October 1985) is a Pakistani cricket commentator, television host, dentist, and former cricketer. She played as an all-rounder, bowling right-arm leg break and batting right-handed. She appeared in one Test match, 38 One Day Internationals and nine Twenty20 Internationals for Pakistan between 2004 and 2010. She played domestic cricket for Karachi and Zarai Taraqiati Bank Limited.

== Early life and education ==
She was born on 1 October 1985 in Karachi. She graduated from the Fatima Jinnah Dental College and did her MMedSci in Restorative Dentistry from the University of Sheffield.

== Career ==
She played for the Pakistan national women's cricket team, and the Asia XI cricket team. She participated in one Test match, 38 ODIs and nine Twenty20 matches. She took part in the series against New Zealand women on 10 May 2010. She captained the Pakistan team during the ICC Women's World Cup 2009.

In 2010, she retired from all forms of cricket.

In March 2019, she was appointed to head the all women selection panel. In April 2019, she was part of the selection committee to name the Pakistan women's team for their tour to South Africa. In October 2020, she became the first Pakistani woman commentator to serve as a commentator in a men's ODI cricket match. It came during the first ODI between Zimbabwe and Pakistan in Rawalpindi.

== Controversy ==
In a television show, former Pakistan cricketer Batool Fatima accused Urooj Mumtaz of axing former Pakistani cricketer Sana Mir from the 2020 ICC Women's T20 World Cup due to personal issues and grudges between the two. However Mumtaz refuted the allegations made by Batool and insisted that Mir was dropped due to inconsistent performances.
