= Jill Whelan (cricketer) =

Irish cricketer (born 1986)

Personal information
- Full name: Jill Amy Whelan
- Born: 28 December 1986 (age 39); Dublin, Ireland
- Batting: Right-handed
- Bowling: Right-arm medium
- Role: Bowler
- Relatives: Roger Whelan (brother); Heather Whelan (sister)

International information
- National side: Ireland (2004–2011)
- ODI debut (cap 51): 22 July 2004 v New Zealand
- Last ODI: 26 November 2011 v Bangladesh
- T20I debut (cap 12): 1 August 2008 v South Africa
- Last T20I: 16 October 2010 v Netherlands

Career statistics
Competition	WODI	WT20I	WLA	WT20
Matches	29	8	45	10
Runs scored	332	34	622	44
Batting average	16.60	6.80	20.73	7.33
100s/50s	0/0	0/0	0/3	0/0
Top score	39*	13	56	13
Balls bowled	1,228	138	1,887	186
Wickets	29	4	47	7
Bowling average	27.24	33.75	24.23	26.85
5 wickets in innings	0	0	0	0
10 wickets in match	0	0	0	0
Best bowling	3/7	2/26	3/7	3/33
Catches/stumpings	11/–	1/–	16/–	2/–
- Source: CricketArchive, 2 June 2021

Jill Amy Whelan (born 28 December 1986) is an Irish former cricketer who played as a right-arm medium bowler. She played 29 One Day Internationals and 8 Twenty20 Internationals for Ireland between 2004 and 2011, and was part of Ireland's squad for the 2005 Women's Cricket World Cup.
