= 2015–16 Senior Women's Cricket Inter Zonal Three Day Game =

- Dates: 26 February – 16 March 2016
- Administrator: BCCI
- Cricket format: First-class
- Tournament format: Round-robin tournament
- Host: ACA
- Champions: Central Zone (2nd title)
- Runners-up: East Zone
- Participants: 5
- Matches: 10
- Most runs: Mona Meshram (490)
- Most wickets: Gouher Sultana (18)

The 2015–16 Senior Women's Cricket Inter Zonal Three Day Game was the second season of India's Inter Zonal women's first-class competition. The tournament took place from 26 February to 16 March 2016. Five zonal teams participated in the tournament, facing each other in a round-robin format in three-day matches. All matches took place at J Narendranath ACA Cricket Ground, Perecherla and Jagarlamudi Kuppuswamy Choudary College, Guntur. Central Zone won the tournament, their second title in two years.

== Squads ==
Central Zone	East Zone	North Zone	South Zone	West Zone
Punam Raut (c); Neha Badwaik; Pallavi Bharadwaj; Shweta Bishnoi; Nidhi Buley; Kalyani Chawarkar; Varsha Choudhary; Bharti Fulmali; Samantha Lobatto; Babita Meena; Mona Meshram; Nuzhat Parween; Kavita Patil; Shivangi Raj; Sneh Rana; Aditi Sharma; Shubhlakshmi Sharma; Neetu Singh; Shashi Singh; Pooja Vastrakar	Madhusmita Behera (c); Rekharani Bora; Rima Chakraborty; Saika Ishaque; Kadambini Mahakhud; Mandira Mahapatra; Sujata Mallik; Madhuri Mehta; Aparna Mondal; Sukanya Parida; Sushree Pradhan; Niharika Prasad; Swagatika Rath; Priyanka Roy; Tanusree Sarkar; Ritu Sharma	Latika Kumari (c); Taniya Bhatia; Preeti Bose; Neena Chaudhary; Nikita Chauhan; Harleen Deol; Suman Gulia; Mansi Joshi; Amarpal Kaur; Mehak Kesar; Sonia Khatri; Reema Malhotra; Babita Negi; Bhawna Ohlan; Shiva Prajapati; Priya Punia; Latika Sangwan; Rubia Sheikh; Renuka Singh; Kashish Verma; Soni Yadav	Karu Jain (c); Rupali Chavan; Swetha Chelakara; Hemalatha Dayalan; Rameshwari Gayakwad; Rakshitha Kalegowda; Akanksha Kohli; Jincy Kutty; Sabbhineni Meghana; Anusha Neeruggati; Namita Ojha; Shikha Pandey; Kalpana Raavi; Santoshi Rane; Arundhati Reddy; Shani Sasidharan; Asha Sobhana; Gouher Sultana; Vanitha Vellaswamy; Kavya Vellore; Sunanda Yetrekar	Sulakshana Naik (c); Reena Dabhi; Manali Dakshini; Priyanka Garkhede; Tejal Hasabnis; Jayshree Jadeja; Snehal Jadhav; Mugdha Joshi; Humarira Kazi; Shweta Mane; Heena Patel; Khushboo Patel; Nancy Patel; Palak Patel; Sheral Rozario; Devika Vaidya; Radha Yadav

Source: BCCI

== Competition format ==
The five teams played in a round-robin league, therefore playing four matches each. Matches were played using a three-day format.

The league worked on a points system with positions within the divisions based on the total points. Points were awarded as follows:

Win: 6 points.
Tie: 3 points.
Loss: 0 points.
Drawn (lead after first innings): 3 points
Drawn (trail after first innings): 1 point
Drawn (no decision on first innings): 1 point
Abandoned without a ball bowled: 1 point

If points in the final table are equal, teams are separated by most wins and then by their quotient (runs per wicket for divided by runs per wicket against).

== Standings ==
Team	Pld	W	L	DWF	DLF	ND	BP	Pts	Quot
Central Zone (C)	4	1	0	2	1	0	1	14	1.828
East Zone	4	0	0	3	1	0	0	10	1.191
South Zone	4	0	0	2	2	0	0	8	1.054
West Zone	4	0	0	2	2	0	0	8	0.746
North Zone	4	0	1	0	3	0	0	3	0.645

Source: CricketArchive

== Fixtures ==
=== Round 1 ===
26 – 28 February 2016
Scorecard

South Zone	v	West Zone
147 (71 overs); Dayalan Hemalatha 26 (41); Sheral Rozario 2/19 (7 overs)		240 (113.1 overs); Sulakshana Naik 99 (215); Gouher Sultana 5/41 (30 overs)
246/8 (91.4 overs); Sunanda Yetrekar 52* (133); Sheral Rozario 3/40 (10.4 overs)

Match drawn
JKC College Ground, Guntur
Umpires: Sud Abhiroope and Bhatt Vikas

- South Zone won the toss and elected to bat.
- West Zone lead on first innings.
- Points: West Zone 3, South Zone 1.

26 – 28 February 2016
Scorecard

East Zone	v	North Zone
268 (140.5 overs); Priyanka Roy 94 (303); Reema Malhotra 4/48 (16.5 overs)		195 (101.4 overs); Taniya Bhatia 34 (89); Rima Chakraborty 3/4 (9.4 overs)
27/1 (12 overs); Madhuri Mehta 10 (15); Mansi Joshi 1/14 (4 overs)

Match drawn
J Narendranath ACA Cricket Ground, Perecherla
Umpires: Bhanushali Ashish and Ganasyam Prabhu

- North Zone won the toss and elected to field.
- East Zone lead on first innings.
- Points: East Zone 3, North Zone 1.

=== Round 2 ===
2 – 4 March 2016
Scorecard

South Zone	v	North Zone
323/9d (107.3 overs); Sabbhineni Meghana 133 (193); Mansi Joshi 3/53 (15 overs)		181 (112.5 overs); Harleen Deol 57 (185); Gouher Sultana 4/48 (29.5 overs)
85/4 (34 overs); Sabbhineni Meghana 28 (44); Soni Yadav 2/32 (14 overs)

Match drawn
JKC College Ground, Guntur
Umpires: Bhanushali Ashish and Bhatt Vikas

- North Zone won the toss and elected to field.
- South Zone lead on first innings.
- Points: South Zone 3, North Zone 1.

2 – 4 March 2016
Scorecard

Central Zone	v	East Zone
262 (129 overs); Mona Meshram 96 (196); Priyanka Roy 2/47 (17 overs)		192 (144.5 overs); Madhuri Mehta 56 (229); Nidhi Buley 4/28 (39.5 overs)

Match drawn
J Narendranath ACA Cricket Ground, Perecherla
Umpires: Sud Abhiroope and Ganasyam Prabhu

- Central Zone won the toss and elected to bat.
- Central Zone lead on first innings.
- Points: Central Zone 3, East Zone 1.

=== Round 3 ===
6 – 8 March 2016
Scorecard

South Zone	v	Central Zone
215 (103 overs); Sabbhineni Meghana 48 (79); Nidhi Buley 5/72 (37 overs)		168 (111.2 overs); Shweta Bishnoi 38 (99); Gouher Sultana 6/46 (43.2 overs)
134/7 (65 overs); Sabbhineni Meghana 41 (107); Sneh Rana 5/58 (24 overs)

Match drawn
J Narendranath ACA Cricket Ground, Perecherla
Umpires: Chavan Sandeep and Sahasrabudhe Anish

- South Zone won the toss and elected to bat
- South Zone lead on first innings.
- Points: South Zone 3, Central Zone 1.

6 – 8 March 2016
Scorecard

North Zone	v	West Zone
158 (68 overs); Reema Malhotra 51* (104); Sheral Rozario 3/14 (16 overs)		293 (116.1 overs); Devika Vaidya 72 (116); Mansi Joshi 3/43 (18.1 overs)
291/6d (88.4 overs); Taniya Bhatia 85* (121); Devika Vaidya 2/69 (24 overs)

Match drawn
JKC College Ground, Guntur
Umpires: K Raghuram and Kurra Prabhakar Rao

- North Zone won the toss and elected to bat
- West Zone lead on first innings.
- Points: West Zone 3, North Zone 1.

=== Round 4 ===
10 – 12 March 2016
Scorecard

East Zone	v	West Zone
270 (139.1 overs); Madhuri Mehta 82 (244); Devika Vaidya 3/79 (35.1 overs)		212 (110.5 overs); Sulakshana Naik 68 (177); Sukanya Parida 3/30 (18.5 overs)
20/0 (4 overs); Priyanka Roy 10* (12)

Match drawn
JKC College Ground, Guntur
Umpires: Kurra Prabhakar Rao and K Raghuram

- West Zone won the toss and elected to field
- East Zone lead on first innings.
- Points: East Zone 3, West Zone 1.

10 – 12 March 2016
Scorecard

Central Zone	v	North Zone
277 (114.2 overs); Mona Meshram 193 (350); Preeti Bose 4/59 (32.2 overs)		124 (77.1 overs); Taniya Bhatia 45 (146); Sneh Rana 3/39 (24 overs)
		96 (63.4 overs) (f/o); Harleen Deol 41 (137); Nidhi Buley 3/30 (18.4 overs)

Central Zone won by an innings and 57 runs
J Narendranath ACA Cricket Ground, Perecherla
Umpires: Chavan Sandeep and Sahasrabudhe Anish

- Central Zone won the toss and elected to bat
- Points: Central Zone 7, North Zone 0.

=== Round 5 ===
14 – 16 March 2016
Scorecard

Central Zone	v	West Zone
398/5d (128.5 overs); Mona Meshram 201 (325); Radha Yadav 3/79 (28 overs)		207 (91.3 overs); Sulakshana Naik 47 (125); Shivangiraj Singh 4/40 (16 overs)
		120/6 (40 overs) (f/o); Mugdha Joshi 62* (108); Pooja Vastrakar 2/32 (11 overs)

Match drawn
JKC College Ground, Guntur
Umpires: M Ashwin Kumar and Krishnadas Mohit

- Central Zone won the toss and elected to bat
- Central Zone lead on first innings.
- Points: Central Zone 3, West Zone 1

14 – 16 March 2016
Scorecard

East Zone	v	South Zone
299 (152.3 overs); Madhusmita Behera 88 (324); Gouher Sultana 3/49 (42 overs)		206 (92.2 overs); Dayalan Hemalatha 52 (118); Sushree Dibyadarshini 2/25 (9 overs)
44/2 (9 overs); Swagatika Rath 33* (35); Vellore Mahesh Kavya 1/12 (2 overs)

Match drawn
J Narendranath ACA Cricket Ground, Perecherla
Umpires: Dhokre Vaibhav and Bhatt Milind

- East Zone won the toss and elected to bat
- East Zone lead on first innings.
- Points: East Zone 3, South Zone 1.

== Statistics ==
=== Top runs scorers ===
Pos	Player	Team	Runs	Mat	Inns	NO	HS	Avg	BF	SR	100	50	4s	6s
1	Mona Meshram	CZ	490	4	4	0	201	122.50	888	55.18	2	1	66	5
2	Sabbhineni Meghana	SZ	274	3	5	0	133	54.80	478	57.32	1	0	36	1
3	Sulakshana Naik	WZ	226	4	5	0	99	45.20	535	42.24	0	2	38	0
4	Tanusree Sarkar	EZ	218	4	5	1	75	54.50	714	30.53	0	2	30	0
5	Mugdha Joshi	WZ	209	4	5	1	70	52.25	532	39.28	0	2	29	0

=== Highest individual score ===
Pos	Player	Team	HS	BF	4s	6s	SR	Against	Venue	Match Date
1	Mona Meshram	CZ	201	325	25	3	61.84	West Zone	Guntur	14 March 2016
2	Mona Meshram	CZ	193	350	26	1	55.14	North Zone	Perecherla	10 March 2016
3	Sabbhineni Meghana	SZ	133	193	15	1	68.91	North Zone	Guntur	2 March 2016
4	Sulakshana Naik	WZ	99	215	15	0	46.04	South Zone	Guntur	26 February 2016
5	Mona Meshram	CZ	96	196	15	1	48.97	East Zone	Perecherla	2 March 2016

=== Most wickets ===
Pos	Player	Team	Wkts	Mat	Inns	Overs	Runs	BBI	Avg	Econ	SR	4w	5w
1	Gouher Sultana	SZ	18	4	4	145.1	184	6/46	10.22	1.26	48.38	1	2
2	Nidhi Buley	CZ	16	4	7	151.3	246	5/72	15.37	1.62	56.81	1	1
2	Sneh Rana	CZ	16	4	7	174.0	310	5/58	19.37	1.78	65.25	1	1
4	Devika Vaidya	WZ	14	4	6	149.1	418	3/61	29.85	2.80	63.92	0	0
5	Preeti Bose	NZ	12	4	6	143.2	221	4/59	18.41	1.54	71.66	1	0

=== Best bowling figures ===
Pos	Player	Team	BBI	Overs	Econ	Wkts	SR	Against	Venue	Match Date
1	Gouher Sultana	SZ	6/46	43.2	1.06	6	43.33	Central Zone	Perecherla	6 March 2016
2	Gouher Sultana	SZ	5/41	30.0	1.36	5	36.00	West Zone	Guntur	26 February 2016
3	Sneh Rana	CZ	5/58	24.0	2.41	5	28.80	South Zone	Perecherla	6 March 2016
4	Nidhi Buley	CZ	5/72	37.0	1.94	5	44.40	South Zone	Perecherla	6 March 2016
5	Nidhi Buley	CZ	4/28	39.5	0.70	4	59.75	East Zone	Perecherla	2 March 2016

Source: BCCI
