= 2016–17 Senior Women's Cricket Inter Zonal Three Day Game =

- Dates: 1 March – 19 March 2017
- Administrator(s): BCCI
- Cricket format: First-class
- Tournament format(s): Round-robin tournament
- Host(s): India
- Champions: Central Zone (3rd title)
- Participants: 5
- Matches: 10
- Most runs: Punam Raut (346)
- Most wickets: Ekta Bisht (21)
- Official website: bcci.tv

The 2016–17 Senior Women's Cricket Inter Zonal Three Day Game was the third season of India's Inter Zonal women's first-class competition. The tournament took place from 1 to 19 March 2017. Five zonal teams participated in the tournament, facing each other in a round-robin format in three-day matches. All matches took place in Chhattisgarh. Central Zone won the tournament, their third title in three years.

== Squads ==
Central Zone	East Zone	North Zone	South Zone	West Zone
Mithali Raj (c); Pallavi Bharadwaj; Ekta Bisht; Kalyani Chawarkar; Rajeshwari Gayakwad; Thirush Kamini; Harmanpreet Kaur; Veda Krishnamurthy; Babita Meena; Mona Meshram; Shweta Mishra; Yashi Pandey; Nuzhat Parween; Kavita Patil; Punam Raut; Shivangi Raj; Deepti Sharma; Sweta Verma; Poonam Yadav; Soni Yadav	Madhusmita Behera (c); Rekharani Bora; Rima Chakraborty; Rumeli Dhar; Saika Ishaque; Mamtha Kanojia; Ashwani Kumari; Shobha Kumari; Mandira Mahapatra; Sujata Mallik; Sarita Meher; Madhuri Mehta; Kadambini Mohakhud; Aparna Mondal; Sukanya Parida; Niharika Prasad; Priyanka Priyadarshini; Priyanka Roy; Priyanka Sawaiyan	Reema Malhotra (c); Taniya Bhatia; Preeti Bose; Neena Choudhary; Harleen Deol; Anju Devi; Suman Gulia; Mansi Joshi; Amarpal Kaur; Mandeep Kaur; Tanuja Kanwar; Mehak Kesar; Sonia Khatri; Latika Kumari; Shashi Malik; Babita Negi; Bhawna Ohlan; SA Sharma; Renuka Singh; Neha Tanwar	Shikha Pandey (c); Neeragattu Anusha; Jincy George; Vinavi Gurav; Dayalan Hemalatha; Nikita Malik; Minnu Mani; Sabbhineni Meghana; Sravanthi Naidu; Namita Ojha; Krishnappa Rakshitha; Doli Ramya; Arundathi Reddy; Sajeevan Sajana; Satish Shubha; Gouher Sultana; Yetrekar Sunanda; Ananya Upendran; Vellaswamy Vanitha; Himani Yadav	Anuja Patil (c); Yastika Bhatia; Neha Chavda; Reena Dabhi; Manali Dakshini; Anagha Deshpande; Tejal Hasabnis; Jayu Jadeja; Mridula Jadeja; Mugdha Joshi; Mukta Magre; Sanjula Naik; Nancy Patel; Tarannum Pathan; Utkarsha Pawar; Jemimah Rodrigues; Sayali Satghare; Shivali Shinde; Devika Vaidya

Source: BCCI

== Competition format ==
The five teams played in a round-robin league, therefore playing four matches each. Matches were played using a three-day format.

The league worked on a points system with positions within the divisions based on the total points. Points were awarded as follows:

Win: 6 points.
Tie: 3 points.
Loss: 0 points.
Drawn (lead after first innings): 3 points
Drawn (trail after first innings): 1 point
Drawn (no decision on first innings): 1 point
Abandoned without a ball bowled: 1 point

If points in the final table are equal, teams are separated by most wins, then net run rate.

== Standings ==
Team	Pld	W	L	DWF	DLF	ND	BP	Pts	NRR
Central Zone (C)	4	2	0	2	0	0	1	19	1.184
West Zone	4	1	0	1	2	0	1	12	0.041
North Zone	4	1	0	0	3	0	0	9	0.053
East Zone	4	0	1	2	1	0	0	7	–1.225
South Zone	4	0	3	1	0	0	0	3	–0.003

Source: CricketArchive

== Fixtures ==
=== Round 1 ===
1 – 3 March 2017
Scorecard

South Zone	v	West Zone
107 (63.3 overs); Sunada Yetrekar 25 (44); Tarannum Pathan 3/20 (8 overs)		272/9d (115.1 overs); Yastika Bhatia 72 (170); Shikha Pandey 2/27 (19 overs)
56 (36.3 overs); Namita Ojha 17 (45); Manali Dakshini 3/11 (7 overs)

West Zone won by an innings and 109 runs
Shaheed Veer Narayan Singh International Stadium, Raipur
Umpires: Rajeev Kumar and Sud Abhiroope

- South Zone won the toss and elected to bat.
- Points: West Zone 7, South Zone 0.

1 – 3 March 2017
Scorecard

North Zone	v	East Zone
251 (94.4 overs); Mandeep Kaur 55 (130); Priyanka Roy 4/54 (17.4 overs)		264/6d (171 overs); Mamtha Kanojia 100* (410); Tanuja Kanwar 4/51 (42 overs)

Match drawn
B S P Cricket Stadium, Bhilai
Umpires: M Ashwin Kumar and Sahasrabudhe Anish

- North Zone won the toss and elected to bat.
- East Zone lead on first innings.
- Points: East Zone 3, North Zone 1.

=== Round 2 ===
5 – 7 March 2017
Scorecard

North Zone	v	South Zone
244 (109.3 overs); Neha Tanwar 54 (116); Gouher Sultana 6/55 (30 overs)		94 (48 overs); Vellaswamy Vanitha 19 (25); Tanuja Kanwar 4/37 (17 overs)
37/3 (16.1 overs); Latika Kumari 14 (36); Gouher Sultana 1/6 (3.1 overs)		186 (81.3 overs) f/o); Vellaswamy Vanitha 51 (99); Preeti Bose 4/49 (26.3 overs)

North Zone won by 7 wickets
Shaheed Veer Narayan Singh International Stadium, Raipur
Umpires: Sahasrabudhe Anish and Vikas Bhatt

- North Zone won the toss and elected to bat.
- Points: North Zone 6, South Zone 0.

5 – 7 March 2017
Scorecard

East Zone	v	Central Zone
184 (105.3 overs); Priyanka Roy 52 (141); Rajeshwari Gaikwad 5/27 (24 overs)		340/4d (64 overs); Punam Raut 145 (166); Madhusmita Behera 2/56 (12 overs)
80 (49.2 overs); Priyanka Priyadarshini 27 (63); Deepti Sharma 5/28 (15.2 overs)

Central Zone won by an innings and 76 runs
B S P Cricket Stadium, Bhilai
Umpires: Sud Abhiroope and M Ashwin Kumar

- East Zone won the toss and elected to bat.
- Points: Central Zone 7, East Zone 0.

=== Round 3 ===
9 – 10 March 2017
Scorecard

South Zone	v	Central Zone
193 (63.3 overs); Vellaswamy Vanitha 109 (98); Rajeshwari Gayakwad 4/39 (16.3 overs)		206 (80.4 overs); Deepti Sharma 46 (114); Sunada Yetrekar 2/29 (10 overs)
63 (30.1 overs); Sabbhineni Meghana 29 (61); Ekta Bisht 4/12 (8.1 overs)		54/1 (10.5 overs); Punam Raut 24* (32); Sravanthi Naidu 1/8 (2 overs)

Central Zone won by 9 wickets
B S P Cricket Stadium, Bhilai
Umpires: Bhatt Milind and Chavan Sandeep

- South Zone won the toss and elected to bat.
- Points: Central Zone 6, South Zone 0.

9 – 11 March 2017
Scorecard

North Zone	v	West Zone
98 (57.3 overs); Neena Choudhary 40 (145); Devika Vaidya 5/18 (12.3 overs)		202 (91.1 overs); Devika Vaidya 51 (93); Harleen Deol 3/14 (7 overs)
231 (107.3 overs); Neena Choudhary 74 (223); Anuja Patil 3/38 (21 overs)		25/6 (18 overs); Tejal Hasabnis 8* (28); Preeti Bose 3/3 (6 overs)

Match drawn
Shaheed Veer Narayan Singh International Stadium, Raipur
Umpires: Bahuleyan Viswajith and R Rajesh Kannan

- North Zone won the toss and elected to bat.
- West Zone lead on first innings.
- Points: West Zone 3, North Zone 0.

=== Round 4 ===
13 – 15 March 2017
Scorecard

East Zone	v	West Zone
347/9d (155.5 overs); Rumeli Dhar 87 (271); Tarannum Pathan 4/52 (29 overs)		227 (96.1 overs); Anuja Patil 54 (125); Priyanka Roy 4/38 (18 overs)
25/2 (10 overs); Madhusmita Behera 19 (25); N Chavda 2/0 (2 overs)

Match drawn
Shaheed Veer Narayan Singh International Stadium, Raipur
Umpires: Bahuleyan Viswajith and R Rajesh Kannan

- West Zone won the toss and elected to field.
- East Zone lead on first innings.
- Points: East Zone 3, West Zone 1.

13 – 15 March 2017
Scorecard

North Zone	v	Central Zone
179 (87.5 overs); Latika Kumari 46 (84); Ekta Bisht 5/57 (26.5 overs)		263/8d (84.2 overs); Sweta Verma 75* (140); Tanuja Kanwar 4/66 (21 overs)
211 (109.4 overs); Reema Malhotra 82* (162); Ekta Bisht 4/48 (34 overs)

Match drawn
B S P Cricket Stadium, Bhilai
Umpires: Bhatt Milind and Chavan Sandeep

- North Zone won the toss and elected to bat.
- Central Zone lead on first innings.
- Points: Central Zone 3, North Zone 1.

=== Round 5 ===
17 – 19 March 2019
Sorecard

Central Zone	v	West Zone
205 (94.3 overs); Punam Raut 125 (260); Manali Dakshini 3/42 (11.3 overs)		114 (67.3 overs); Mugdha Joshi 44 (150); Ekta Bisht 3/20 (16 overs)
161/5d (48 overs); Nuzhat Parween 57* (92); Reena Dabhi 2/11 (4 overs)		157/8 (68 overs); Anuja Patil 72* (108); Rajeshwari Gayakwad 4/51 (24 overs)

Match drawn
Shaheed Veer Narayan Singh International Stadium, Raipur
Umpires: Sivakumar A and Mohamad Mideen Mohamad Rafi

- Central Zone won the toss and elected to bat.
- Central Zone lead on first innings.
- Points: Central Zone 3, West Zone 1.

17 – 19 March 2017
Scorecard

South Zone	v	East Zone
360/8d (118.4 overs); Sabbhineni Meghana 120 (220); Priyanka Priyadarshini 2/44 (16.4 overs)		310 (135.4 overs); Kadambini Mohakhud 94 (174); Gouher Sultana 5/77 (35.4 overs)

Match drawn
B S P Cricket Stadium, Bhilai
Umpires: Kannur Swaroopanand and Dhokre Vaibhav

- South Zone won the toss and elected to bat.
- South Zone lead on first innings.
- Points: South Zone 3, East Zone 1.
