= List of BCCI domestic tournaments and teams =

Indian domestic cricket tournament and teams

This is a list of domestic cricket teams and tournaments governed by the Board of Control for Cricket in India (BCCI). It includes 38 regional and others institutional teams representing Indian states, union territories, and government bodies, along with the major domestic competitions in which they participate, such as Ranji Trophy.

== List of tournaments ==
=== Men’s Senior Tournaments ===
The Men’s Senior tournaments are the pinnacle of domestic cricket for senior male cricketers in India. These include the premier first-class, List A, and T20 tournaments.

Men’s Senior Tournaments
Tournament Name	Format	Current Winner	Last Tournament
Ranji Trophy	First-class	Jammu and Kashmir (1st title)	2025-26
Duleep Trophy	First-class	East Zone (3rd title)	2026-27
Irani Trophy	First-class	Vidarbha (3rd title)	2025-26
Vijay Hazare Trophy	List A	Vidarbha (1st title)	2025-26
Deodhar Trophy	List A	South Zone (9th title)	2023
Syed Mushtaq Ali Trophy	T20	Jharkhand (1st title)	2025-26

=== Women’s Senior Tournaments ===
The Women’s Senior tournaments provide a competitive platform for senior female cricketers in India. These tournaments mirror the men's categories but are focused on women's cricket.

Women’s Senior Tournaments
Tournament Name	Format	Current Winner	Last Tournament
Senior Women's Inter Zonal Multi-Day Trophy	First-class	East Zone (1st title)	2023-24
Senior Women's One-Day Trophy	List A	Delhi (2nd title)	2025-26
Senior Women's Inter Zonal One-Day Trophy	List A	North Zone (1st title)	2022-23
Senior Women's T20 Trophy	T20	Maharashtra (1st title)	2025-26
Senior Women's Inter Zonal T20 Trophy	T20	East Zone (1st title)	2023-24

=== Men’s Youth Tournaments ===
The Men’s Youth tournaments focus on young male cricketers, providing them with opportunities to showcase their talent at the national level.

Men’s Youth Tournaments
Tournament Name	Format	Current Winner	Last Tournament Date
C. K. Nayudu Trophy	Under-23 First-class	Punjab Under-23 (2024–25)	2024-25
Mens Under-23 State A Trophy	Under-23 List A	Tamil Nadu Under-23 (2025–26)	2024-25
Cooch Behar Trophy	Under-19 First-class	Tamil Nadu Under-19 (2024–25)	2024-25
Vinoo Mankad Trophy	Under-19 List A	Gujarat Under-19 (2024)	2024
Vijay Merchant Trophy	Under-16 First-class	Uttar Pradesh Under-16 (2024–25)	2024-25

=== Women’s Youth Tournaments ===
The Women’s Youth tournaments give young female cricketers the chance to develop and display their skills on a national stage.

Women’s Youth Tournaments
Tournament Name	Format	Current Winner	Last Tournament Date
Women's Under-23 One-Day Trophy	Under-23 List A	Haryana Women's Under-23 (2024)	2024
Women's Under-23 T20 Trophy	Under-23 T20	Delhi Women's Under-23 (2025)	2025
Women's Under-19 One-Day Trophy	Under-19 List A	Uttar Pradesh Women's Under-19 (2025)	2025
Women's Under-19 T20 Trophy	Under-19 T20	Tamil Nadu Women's Under-19 (2024)	2024
Women's Under-15 One-Day Trophy	Under-15 List A	Bengal Women's Under-15 (2024)	2024

=== Franchise Level Tournaments ===
The BCCI also oversees franchise-level tournaments, which provide opportunities for regional and private teams to participate in competitive cricket.

Tournament Name	Format	Current Winner	Last Tournament Date
Indian Premier League (IPL)	T20	Royal Challengers Bengaluru (2026)	2026
Women's Premier League (WPL)	T20	Royal Challengers Bengaluru (WPL) (2026)	2026

== List of teams ==
The following is the list of Indian domestic teams representing cities, regions, states, union territories and organizations in inter-state competitions:

Team	State	Governing Body	Years	Men's				Women's		
Team	State	Governing Body	Years	Senior	U-23	U-19	U-16	Senior	U-23	U-19
Andhra	Andhra Pradesh	Andhra Cricket Association	1994–	check	check	check	check	check	check	check
Arunachal Pradesh	Arunachal Pradesh	Arunachal Cricket Association	2018–	check	check	check	check	check	check	check
Assam	Assam	Assam Cricket Association	2002–	check	check	check	check	check	check	check
Baroda	Gujarat's city of Vadodara	Baroda Cricket Association	1943–	check	check	check	check	check	check	check
Bengal	West Bengal	Cricket Association of Bengal	1943–	check	check	check	check	check	check	check
Bihar	Bihar	Bihar Cricket Association	1943–2004, 2018–	check	check	check	check	check	check	check
Chhattisgarh	Chhattisgarh	Chhattisgarh State Cricket Sangh	2016–	check	check	check	check	check	check	check
Chandigarh	Chandigarh	Union Territory Cricket Association	2019–	check	check	check	check	check	check	check
Delhi	Delhi	Delhi & District Cricket Association	1943–	check	check	check	check	check	check	check
Goa	Goa	Goa Cricket Association	1989–	check	check	check	check	check	check	check
Gujarat	* Gujarat (shared) * Dadra and Nagar Haveli of Dadra and Nagar Haveli and Daman and Diu * Daman of Dadra and Nagar Haveli and Daman and Diu	Gujarat Cricket Association	1935–	check	check	check	check	check	check	check
Haryana	Haryana	Haryana Cricket Association	1991–	check	check	check	check	check	check	check
Himachal Pradesh	Himachal Pradesh	Himachal Pradesh Cricket Association	1999–	check	check	check	check	check	check	check
Hyderabad	Telangana	Hyderabad Cricket Association	1934–	check	check	check	check	check	check	check
Jammu and Kashmir	Jammu and Kashmir	Jammu and Kashmir Cricket Association	1999–	check	check	check	check	check	check	check
Jharkhand	Jharkhand	Jharkhand State Cricket Association	2004–	check	check	check	check	check	check	check
Karnataka	Karnataka	Karnataka State Cricket Association	1934–	check	check	check	check	check	check	check
Kerala	Kerala	Kerala Cricket Association	1997–	check	check	check	check	check	check	check
Madhya Pradesh	Madhya Pradesh	Madhya Pradesh Cricket Association	1995–	check	check	check	check	check	check	check
Maharashtra	Maharashtra (shared)	Maharashtra Cricket Association	1935–	check	check	check	check	check	check	check
Manipur	Manipur	Manipur Cricket Association	2018–	check	check	check	check	check	check	check
Meghalaya	Meghalaya	Meghalaya Cricket Association	2018–	check	check	check	check	check	check	check
Mizoram	Mizoram	Cricket Association of Mizoram	2018–	check	check	check	check	check	check	check
Mumbai	Maharashtra's city of Mumbai	Mumbai Cricket Association	1892–	check	check	check	check	check	check	check
Nagaland	Nagaland	Nagaland Cricket Association	2018–	check	check	check	check	check	check	check
Odisha	Odisha	Odisha Cricket Association	1949–	check	check	check	check	check	check	check
Pondicherry	Puducherry	Cricket Association of Pondicherry	2018–	check	check	check	check	check	check	check
Punjab	Punjab	Punjab Cricket Association	1993–	check	check	check	check	check	check	check
Railways	Indian Railways	Railways Sports Promotion Board	2001–	check	check	X mark	X mark	check	check	X mark
Rajasthan	Rajasthan	Rajasthan Cricket Association	2002–	check	check	check	check	check	check	check
Saurashtra	* Gujarat's region of Saurashtra and Kutch * Diu of Dadra and Nagar Haveli and Daman and Diu	Saurashtra Cricket Association	1948–	check	check	check	check	check	check	check
Services	Indian Armed Forces	Services Sports Control Board	1949–	check	X mark	X mark	X mark	X mark	X mark	X mark
Sikkim	Sikkim	Sikkim Cricket Association	2018–	check	check	check	check	check	check	check
Tamil Nadu	Tamil Nadu	Tamil Nadu Cricket Association	1934–	check	check	check	check	check	check	check
Tripura	Tripura	Tripura Cricket Association	2002–	check	check	check	check	check	check	check
Uttar Pradesh	Uttar Pradesh	Uttar Pradesh Cricket Association	1935–	check	check	check	check	check	check	check
Uttarakhand	Uttarakhand	Cricket Association of Uttarakhand	2018–	check	check	check	check	check	check	check
Vidarbha	Maharashtra's region of Vidarbha	Vidarbha Cricket Association	2003–	check	check	check	check	check	check	check

=== Status of states' representation ===
The following states have representation other than "One State One Team" in the competitions:

States with multiple teams
State	Team
Gujarat	Baroda; Gujarat; Saurashtra
Maharashtra	Maharashtra; Mumbai; Vidarbha
States/UTs with representation under another team(s)
State/union territory	Team
Dadra and Nagar Haveli and Daman and Diu	Gujarat for Dadra and Nagar Haveli and Daman; Saurashtra for Diu
Telangana	Hyderabad
States/UTs with no representation
State/union territory	Team
Andaman and Nicobar Islands	No Team
Lakshadweep	No Team
Ladakh	No Team

=== National-level teams ===
The following is the list of Indian domestic teams representing the national level teams for domestic tournaments and tour games:

Team	Years	International		Domestic		
Team	Years	Men's	Women's	Men's Senior	Women's Senior	Men's U-19
India A	1999–	check	check	check	X mark	X mark
India under-19s	1979–	check	check	X mark	X mark	X mark
BCCI President's XI	1964–	check	check	X mark	X mark	X mark
Rest of India	1960–	X mark	X mark	check	X mark	X mark
India B	2000–	X mark	X mark	check	check	X mark
India Blue	2006–	X mark	X mark	check	check	check
India Green	2006–	X mark	X mark	check	check	check
India Red	2006–	X mark	X mark	check	check	check

- Note 1: The participation records are up to 2017–18 season.
- India C is one of the national and domestic level teams.

=== Regional Teams ===
Regional Cricket Teams of India
Zone	Member Teams / States
North Zone	Chandigarh, Delhi, Haryana, Himachal Pradesh, Jammu and Kashmir, Punjab, Services
South Zone	Andhra, Goa, Hyderabad, Karnataka, Kerala, Pondicherry, Tamil Nadu
East Zone	Assam, Bengal, Bihar, Jharkhand, Odisha, Tripura
West Zone	Baroda, Gujarat, Maharashtra, Mumbai, Saurashtra
Central Zone	Chhattisgarh, Madhya Pradesh, Railways, Rajasthan, Uttar Pradesh, Uttarakhand, Vidarbha
North East Zone	Arunachal Pradesh, Manipur, Meghalaya, Mizoram, Nagaland, Sikkim

== See also ==
- List of members of the Board of Control for Cricket in India
