= 2023–24 Senior Women's Inter Zonal T20 =

Domestic cricket competition

2023–24 Women's Senior Inter Zonal T20
- Dates: 24 November – 4 December 2023
- Administrator(s): BCCI
- Cricket format: Twenty20
- Tournament format(s): Round-robin tournament and final
- Host(s): India
- Champions: East Zone (1st title)
- Runners-up: West Zone
- Participants: 5
- Matches: 16
- Most runs: Bhavana Goplani (112)
- Most wickets: Ekta Bisht (8); Parunika Sisodia (8)
- Official website: bcci.tv

The 2023–24 Senior Women's Inter Zonal T20 was the 2nd edition of the Senior Women's Inter Zonal T20, a domestic women's T20 competition in India. The tournament took place from 24 November to 4 December 2023, with six zonal teams taking part. Central Zone were the defending champions.

East Zone won the competition, by virtue of a higher group stage finish after the final was abandoned due to rain.

== Competition format ==
Six teams competed in the tournament, representing regions of India. Each team played each other once in a round-robin format. The top two teams in the group progressed to the final. Matches were played using a Twenty20 format. All matches were played at the BRSABV Ekana Cricket Stadium, Lucknow.

The groups worked on a points system with positions within the groups being based on the total points. Points were awarded as follows:

Win: 4 points.
Tie: 2 points.
Loss: 0 points.
No Result/Abandoned: 2 points.

If points in the final table were equal, teams were separated by most wins, then head-to-head record, then Net Run Rate.

== Group stage ==
=== Points table ===
Team	P	W	L	T	NR	Pts	NRR
East Zone (Q)	5	4	0	0	1	18	+2.074
West Zone (Q)	5	3	1	0	1	14	+1.237
Central Zone	5	2	2	0	1	10	+1.250
North Zone	5	2	2	0	1	10	+1.341
South Zone	5	2	3	0	0	8	–0.154
North East Zone	5	0	5	0	0	0	–4.778

=== Fixtures ===
24 November 2023
Scorecard

West Zone; 108/9 (20 overs)	v	East Zone; 109/5 (16.5 overs)
Humaira Kazi 41 (34); Deepti Sharma 3/20 (4 overs)		Ashwani Kumari 25 (18); Jaya Mohite 1/18 (3 overs)

East Zone won by 5 wickets
BRSABV Ekana Cricket Stadium, Lucknow
Umpires: Kuppuraj Madanagopal and Vijaykumar Shirpuram

- East Zone won the toss and elected to field.

24 November 2023
Scorecard

North Zone; 155/5 (20 overs)	v	North East Zone; 44 (15.5 overs)
Amanjot Kaur 48* (34); Kiranbala Haorungbam 2/21 (4 overs)		Limatola Ao 12* (15); Kashvee Gautam 5/8 (4 overs)

North Zone won by 111 runs
BRSABV Ekana Cricket Stadium, Lucknow
Umpires: Bharti Vij and Rohan Ingavale

- North East Zone won the toss and elected to field.

24 November 2023
Scorecard

South Zone; 136/8 (20 overs)	v	Central Zone; 111 (19.4 overs)
Shikha Pandey 36 (28); Renuka Singh 3/17 (4 overs)		Aparna Mondal 25 (22); Sundaresan Anusha 3/11 (4 overs)

South Zone won by 25 runs
BRSABV Ekana Cricket Stadium, Lucknow
Umpires: Kuppuraj Madanagopal and Vijaykumar Shirpuram

- Central Zone won the toss and elected to field.

26 November 2023
Scorecard

North Zone; 146/3 (20 overs)	v	South Zone; 99 (18.1 overs)
Shafali Verma 60 (39); Sahana Pawar 1/19 (4 overs)		Purvaja Verlekar 40 (28); Shafali Verma 4/5 (2.1 overs)

North Zone won by 47 runs
BRSABV Ekana Cricket Stadium, Lucknow
Umpires: Bharti Vij and Rohan Ingavale

- South Zone won the toss and elected to field.

26 November 2023
Scorecard

North East Zone; 58 (16.4 overs)	v	East Zone; 59/0 (6 overs)
Luiza Tamang 17 (26); Mita Paul 3/5 (2.4 overs)		Ashwani Kumari 52* (25)

East Zone won by 10 wickets
BRSABV Ekana Cricket Stadium, Lucknow
Umpires: Kuppuraj Madanagopal and Vijaykumar Shirpuram

- East Zone won the toss and elected to field.

26 November 2023
Scorecard

Central Zone; 109/7 (20 overs)	v	West Zone; 110/6 (18.3 overs)
Sneh Rana 41* (37); Devika Vaidya 2/33 (4 overs)		Bhavana Goplani 51 (46); Rajeshwari Gayakwad 2/15 (4 overs)

West Zone won by 4 wickets
BRSABV Ekana Cricket Stadium, Lucknow
Umpires: Bharti Vij and Rohan Ingavale

- Central Zone won the toss and elected to bat.

28 November 2023
Scorecard

South Zone; 72/9 (20 overs)	v	East Zone; 76/4 (15.3 overs)
Sundaresan Anusha 26* (28); Titas Sadhu 4/6 (4 overs)		Deepti Sharma 25 (40); Sundaresan Anusha 2/14 (2.3 overs)

East Zone won by 6 wickets
BRSABV Ekana Cricket Stadium, Lucknow
Umpires: Bharti Vij and Vijaykumar Shirpuram

- East Zone won the toss and elected to field.

28 November 2023
Scorecard

Central Zone; 112/8 (20 overs)	v	North Zone; 77/8 (20 overs)
Punam Raut 30 (29); Parunika Sisodia 2/19 (3 overs)		Laxmi Yadav 46* (43); Nikita Singh 3/15 (4 overs)

Central Zone won by 35 runs
BRSABV Ekana Cricket Stadium, Lucknow
Umpires: Kuppuraj Madanagopal and Rohan Ingavale

- North Zone won the toss and elected to field.

28 November 2023
Scorecard

West Zone; 161/6 (20 overs)	v	North East Zone; 71/6 (20 overs)
Yastika Bhatia 54 (38); Debasmita Dutta 2/23 (4 overs)		Nabam Yapu 35* (48); Saima Thakor 2/12 (4 overs)

West Zone won by 90 runs
BRSABV Ekana Cricket Stadium, Lucknow
Umpires: Bharti Vij and Vijaykumar Shirpuram

- North East Zone won the toss and elected to field.

30 November 2023
Scorecard

North Zone; 56/4 (11 overs)	v	West Zone
Sushma Verma 31* (32); Sayali Satghare 4/11 (4 overs)

No Result
BRSABV Ekana Cricket Stadium, Lucknow
Umpires: Kuppuraj Madanagopal and Rohan Ingavale

- North Zone won the toss and elected to bat.
- No further play possible due to rain.

30 November 2023
Scorecard

Central Zone	v	East Zone

Match Abandoned
BRSABV Ekana Cricket Stadium, Lucknow
Umpires: Bharti Vij and Vijaykumar Shirpuram

- No toss.
- No play possible due to rain.

30 November 2023
Scorecard

North East Zone; 75/6 (20 overs)	v	South Zone; 76/1 (11 overs)
Debasmitta Dutta 24* (51); Shikha Pandey 3/3 (4 overs)		Sneha Deepthi 28 (23)

South Zone won by 9 wickets
BRSABV Ekana Cricket Stadium, Lucknow
Umpires: Kuppuraj Madanagopal and Rohan Ingavale

- South Zone won the toss and elected to field.

2 December 2023
Scorecard

Central Zone; 141/6 (20 overs)	v	North East Zone; 43 (20 overs)
Punam Raut 39 (36); Nabam Yapu 2/21 (3 overs)		Linthoingambi Rajkumari 11 (12); Ekta Bisht 4/5 (4 overs)

Central Zone won by 98 runs
BRSABV Ekana Cricket Stadium, Lucknow
Umpires: Kuppuraj Mandanagopal and Vijaykumar Shirpuram

- North East Zone won the toss and elected to field.

2 December 2023
Scorecard

South Zone; 114/7 (20 overs)	v	West Zone; 118/3 (18.1 overs)
Shikha Pandey 32 (31); Manali Dakshini 2/10 (3 overs)		Yastika Bhatia 37 (32); Najla Noushad 2/22 (4 overs)

West Zone won by 7 wickets
BRSABV Ekana Cricket Stadium, Lucknow
Umpires: Bharti Vij and Rohan Ingavale

- South Zone won the toss and elected to bat.

2 December 2023
Scorecard

North Zone; 112/6 (20 overs)	v	East Zone; 115/5 (17.2 overs)
Harleen Deol 55* (51); Saika Ishaque 3/19 (4 overs)		Deepti Sharma 48* (41); Parunika Sisodia 2/18 (4 overs)

East Zone won by 5 wickets
BRSABV Ekana Cricket Stadium, Lucknow
Umpires: Kuppuraj Madanagopal and Vijaykumar Shirpuram

- East Zone won the toss and elected to field.

== Final ==
4 December 2023
Scorecard

East Zone	v	West Zone

Match Abandoned
BRSABV Ekana Cricket Stadium, Lucknow
Umpires: Kuppuraj Madanagopal and Bharti Vij

- No toss.
- No play possible due to rain.
- East Zone awarded the 2023–24 Women's Senior Inter Zonal T20 title by virtue of a higher group stage position.

== Statistics ==
=== Most runs ===
Player	Team	Matches	Innings	Runs	Average	HS	100s	50s
Bhavana Goplani	West Zone	4	3	112	112.00	51	0	1
Yastika Bhatia	West Zone	5	4	107	26.75	54	0	1
Punam Raut	Central Zone	5	4	106	26.50	39	0	0
Sushma Verma	North Zone	5	5	105	35.00	47*	0	0
Amanjot Kaur	North Zone	5	5	98	49.00	48*	0	0

Source: BCCI

=== Most wickets ===
Player	Team	Overs	Wickets	Average	5w
Ekta Bisht	Central Zone	15.3	8	7.50	0
Parunika Sisodia	North Zone	13.5	8	9.50	0
Saika Ishaque	East Zone	15.0	7	7.71	0
Sundaresan Anusha	South Zone	18.3	7	15.28	0
Shafali Verma	North Zone	7.1	6	7.66	0

Source: BCCI
