= 2022–23 Senior Women's Inter Zonal T20 =

Domestic cricket competition

2022–23 Women's Senior Inter Zonal T20
- Dates: 8 – 16 November 2022
- Administrator(s): BCCI
- Cricket format: Twenty20
- Tournament format(s): Round-robin tournament and final
- Host(s): India
- Champions: Central Zone (1st title)
- Runners-up: West Zone
- Participants: 6
- Matches: 16
- Most runs: Nuzhat Parween (271)
- Most wickets: Rashi Kanojiya (10); Anjali Sarvani (10)
- Official website: bcci.tv

The 2022–23 Women's Senior Inter Zonal T20 was the inaugural edition of the Women's Senior Inter Zonal T20, a domestic women's T20 competition in India. The tournament took place from 8 to 16 November 2022, with six zonal teams taking part. It was the first women's inter zonal competition to take place since the 2017–18 Senior Women's Cricket Inter Zonal Three Day Game. The tournament was won by Central Zone, who beat West Zone by 9 wickets in the final.

== Competition format ==
Six teams competed in the tournament, representing regions of India. Each team played each other once in a round-robin format. The top two teams in the group progressed to the final. Matches were played using a Twenty20 format. All matches were played at the BRSABV Ekana Cricket Stadium, Lucknow.

The group worked on a points system with positions within the group being based on the total points. Points were awarded as follows:

Win: 4 points.
Tie: 2 points.
Loss: 0 points.
No Result/Abandoned: 2 points.

If points in the final table were equal, teams were separated by most wins, then head-to-head record, then Net Run Rate.

== Group stage ==
=== Points table ===
| Team | P | W | L | T | NR | Pts | NRR |
|---|---|---|---|---|---|---|---|
| Central Zone (Q) | 5 | 5 | 0 | 0 | 0 | 20 | +2.472 |
| West Zone (Q) | 5 | 4 | 1 | 0 | 0 | 16 | +0.370 |
| South Zone | 5 | 3 | 2 | 0 | 0 | 12 | +1.421 |
| North Zone | 5 | 2 | 3 | 0 | 0 | 8 | +0.630 |
| East Zone | 5 | 1 | 4 | 0 | 0 | 4 | +0.257 |
| North East Zone | 5 | 0 | 5 | 0 | 0 | 0 | –5.250 |

Source: BCCI

=== Fixtures ===
8 November 2022
Scorecard

| North Zone; 131/5 (20 overs) | v | South Zone; 132/7 (17.2 overs) |
| Amanjot Kaur 66 (56); Shikha Pandey 2/18 (3 overs) | | Sneha Deepthi 54 (30); Harleen Deol 4/21 (4 overs) |

South Zone won by 3 wickets
BRSABV Ekana Cricket Stadium, Lucknow
Umpires: Vikas Lund and Akshay Marathe

- South Zone won the toss and elected to field.

8 November 2022
Scorecard

| East Zone; 97/3 (20 overs) | v | West Zone; 100/5 (19.4 overs) |
| Madhuri Mehta 37 (40); Devika Vaidya 2/20 (4 overs) | | Tarannum Pathan 40* (22); Priyanka Priyadarshini 2/15 (4 overs) |

West Zone won by 5 wickets
BRSABV Ekana Cricket Stadium, Lucknow
Umpires: Narayanan Janani and Gayathri Venugopalan

- East Zone won the toss and elected to bat.

8 November 2022
Scorecard

| Central Zone; 149/5 (20 overs) | v | North East Zone; 51 (18.1 overs) |
| Nuzhat Parween 57 (49); Debasmita Dutta 3/27 (4 overs) | | Debasmita Dutta 23 (35); Rashi Kanojiya 1/2 (2 overs) |

Central Zone won by 98 runs
BRSABV Ekana Cricket Stadium, Lucknow
Umpires: Vikas Lund and Akshay Marathe

- Central Zone won the toss and elected to bat.

9 November 2022
Scorecard

| East Zone; 106/2 (20 overs) | v | North Zone; 107/2 (18.4 overs) |
| Madhuri Mehta 47* (53); Anisha Ansari 1/13 (3 overs) | | Harleen Deol 53* (48); DK Ashwani 1/15 (2 overs) |

North Zone won by 8 wickets
BRSABV Ekana Cricket Stadium, Lucknow
Umpires: Narayanan Janani and Gayathri Venugopalan

- North Zone won the toss and elected to field.

9 November 2022
Scorecard

| Central Zone; 146/5 (20 overs) | v | South Zone; 116 (19.5 overs) |
| Nuzhat Parween 33 (32); Sajeevan Sajana 1/21 (3 overs) | | Sajeevan Sajana 60 (52); Anjali Sarvani 3/12 (4 overs) |

Central Zone won by 30 runs
BRSABV Ekana Cricket Stadium, Lucknow
Umpires: Vikas Lund and Akshay Marathe

- Central Zone won the toss and elected to bat.

9 November 2022
Scorecard

| West Zone; 125/2 (20 overs) | v | North East Zone; 50/9 (20 overs) |
| Yastika Bhatia 59* (61); Limatola Ao 1/13 (2 overs) | | Mai Mekh 14 (35); Devika Vaidya 4/6 (4 overs) |

West Zone won by 75 runs
BRSABV Ekana Cricket Stadium, Lucknow
Umpires: Narayanan Janani and Gayathri Venugopalan

- North East Zone won the toss and elected to field.

11 November 2022
Scorecard

| West Zone; 144/6 (20 overs) | v | North Zone; 142/6 (20 overs) |
| Humaira Kazi 54 (45); Harleen Deol 2/18 (4 overs) | | Priya Punia 36 (36); Shradda Pokharkar 2/27 (3 overs) |

West Zone won by 2 runs
BRSABV Ekana Cricket Stadium, Lucknow
Umpires: Narayanan Janani and Gayathri Venugopalan

- North Zone won the toss and elected to field.

11 November 2022
Scorecard

| South Zone; 165/9 (20 overs) | v | North East Zone; 35 (14.1 overs) |
| Lakhmi Nethra 46 (38); Ajima Sangma 4/41 (4 overs) | | Debasmita Dutta 9 (17); Shreyanka Patil 4/7 (4 overs) |

South Zone won by 130 runs
BRSABV Ekana Cricket Stadium, Lucknow
Umpires: Vikas Lund and Akshay Marathe

- South Zone won the toss and elected to bat.

11 November 2022
Scorecard

| East Zone; 144/5 (20 overs) | v | Central Zone; 146/3 (16.4 overs) |
| Ashwani Kumari 65 (49); Poonam Yadav 1/22 (3 overs) | | Jasia Akhtar 56 (32); Devyani Prasad 2/22 (4 overs) |

Central Zone won by 7 wickets
BRSABV Ekana Cricket Stadium, Lucknow
Umpires: Narayanan Janani and Gayathri Venugopalan

- East Zone won the toss and elected to bat.

12 November 2022
Scorecard

| North Zone; 169/4 (20 overs) | v | North East Zone; 54/7 (20 overs) |
| Sushma Verma 87 (57); Limatola Ao 2/28 (4 overs) | | Gangadevi Waikhom 24 (30); Amanjot Kaur 5/9 (4 overs) |

North Zone won by 115 runs
BRSABV Ekana Cricket Stadium, Lucknow
Umpires: Vikas Lund and Akshay Marathe

- North East Zone won the toss and elected to field.

12 November 2022
Scorecard

| South Zone; 126/9 (20 overs) | v | East Zone; 99 (18 overs) |
| Sneha Deepthi 43 (26); Saiqa Ishaque 2/9 (4 overs) | | Jhumki Debnath 24 (25); Shikha Pandey 3/12 (3 overs) |

South Zone won by 27 runs
BRSABV Ekana Cricket Stadium, Lucknow
Umpires: Narayanan Janani and Gayathri Venugopalan

- East Zone won the toss and elected to field.

12 November 2022
Scorecard

| Central Zone; 154/3 (20 overs) | v | West Zone; 105/9 (20 overs) |
| Nuzhat Parween 60 (52); Shraddha Pokharkar 1/19 (3 overs) | | Yastika Bhatia 24 (20); Tanuja Kanwer 4/25 (4 overs) |

Central Zone won by 49 runs
BRSABV Ekana Cricket Stadium, Lucknow
Umpires: Vikas Lund and Akshay Marathe

- West Zone won the toss and elected to field.

14 November 2022
Scorecard

| Central Zone; 136/6 (20 overs) | v | North Zone; 93/9 (20 overs) |
| Nuzhat Parween 57 (59); Amanjot Kaur 2/17 (3 overs) | | Sushma Verma 46 (51); Anjali Sarvani 3/27 (4 overs) |

Central Zone won by 43 runs
BRSABV Ekana Cricket Stadium, Lucknow
Umpires: Vikas Lund and Gayathri Venugopalan

- Central Zone won the toss and elected to bat.

14 November 2022
Scorecard

| South Zone; 123/7 (20 overs) | v | West Zone; 127/8 (20 overs) |
| Ellutla Padmaja 24* (22); Devika Vaidya 2/17 (4 overs) | | Yastika Bhatia 64 (55); Shreyanka Patil 3/25 (4 overs) |

West Zone won by 2 wickets
BRSABV Ekana Cricket Stadium, Lucknow
Umpires: Narayanan Janani and Akshay Marathe

- South Zone won the toss and elected to bat.

14 November 2022
Scorecard

| East Zone; 148/5 (20 overs) | v | North East Zone; 37/8 (16 overs) |
| Madhuri Mehta 58 (51); Debasmita Dutta 2/25 (4 overs) | | Debasmita Dutta 10 (23); Devyani Prasad 3/7 (3 overs) |

East Zone won by 86 runs (VJD method)
BRSABV Ekana Cricket Stadium, Lucknow
Umpires: Vikas Lund and Gayathri Venugopalan

- East Zone won the toss and elected to bat.
- North East Zone innings reduced to 16 overs due to rain; revised target was 124.

== Final ==
16 November 2022
Scorecard

| West Zone; 67 (18 overs) | v | Central Zone; 70/1 (13.4 overs) |
| Shivali Shinde 17 (20); Poonam Yadav 3/11 (3 overs) | | Nuzhat Parween 32* (44); Shraddha Pokharkar 1/11 (4 overs) |

Central Zone won by 9 wickets
BRSABV Ekana Cricket Stadium, Lucknow
Umpires: Narayanan Janani and Gayathri Venugopalan

- West Zone won the toss and elected to bat.

== Statistics ==
=== Most runs ===
| Player | Team | Matches | Innings | Runs | Average | HS | 100s | 50s |
|---|---|---|---|---|---|---|---|---|
| Nuzhat Parween | Central Zone | 6 | 6 | 271 | 54.20 | 60 | 0 | 3 |
| Yastika Bhatia | West Zone | 6 | 6 | 212 | 42.40 | 64 | 0 | 2 |
| Jasia Akhtar | Central Zone | 6 | 6 | 202 | 33.37 | 56 | 0 | 1 |
| Sushma Verma | North Zone | 5 | 5 | 186 | 46.50 | 87 | 0 | 1 |
| Madhuri Mehta | East Zone | 5 | 4 | 152 | 50.67 | 58 | 0 | 1 |

Source: BCCI

=== Most wickets ===
| Player | Team | Overs | Wickets | Average | 5w |
|---|---|---|---|---|---|
| Rashi Kanojiya | Central Zone | 21.0 | 10 | 9.50 | 0 |
| Anjali Sarvani | Central Zone | 24.0 | 10 | 10.80 | 0 |
| Harleen Deol | North Zone | 16.0 | 9 | 8.77 | 0 |
| Devika Vaidya | West Zone | 22.4 | 9 | 12.22 | 0 |
| Amanjot Kaur | North Zone | 12.0 | 8 | 8.37 | 1 |

Source: BCCI
