= List of member associations of the BCCI =

List of members of BCCI

The Board of Control for Cricket in India (BCCI) has member associations grouped into five geographic zones: North, Central, East, West and South. Members include state associations, regional bodies, union territory associations and institutional teams.

Most of the member associations govern cricket in their respective states, while some govern the sport in specific cities or regions. Others govern cricket in union territories, and some represent government institutions such as Indian Railways and the Indian Armed Forces.

== Affiliated Members ==
Membership of the Board of Control for Cricket in India is made up of Full Members and Associate Members.

=== Full Members ===
The majority of full members are state cricket associations. Each state is permitted one representative, except for Gujarat and Maharashtra which have three each. There are additional representatives from Indian Railways and Indian Armed Forces' Services. Changes recommended by the Lodha Committee included restricting full membership to state associations and limiting states to one full member, with the others becoming associate members, but these have not been fully adopted by the BCCI, with existing members retaining full membership except for Cricket Club of India (Mumbai) and National Cricket Club (Kolkata).

Name	Represents	President	Zone
Andhra Cricket Association	Andhra Pradesh	Kesineni Sivanath	South
Arunachal Cricket Association	Arunachal Pradesh	T. C. Tok	North East
Assam Cricket Association	Assam	Taranga Gogoi	East
Baroda Cricket Association	Vadodara (Gujarat)	Pranav Amin	West
Bihar Cricket Association	Bihar	Harsh Vardhan	East
Chhattisgarh State Cricket Sangh	Chhattisgarh	Jubin Shah	Central
Cricket Association of Bengal	West Bengal	Sourav Ganguly	East
Cricket Association of Mizoram	Mizoram	Lalrochhuanga Pachuau	North East
Cricket Association of Pondicherry	Puducherry	G. Ramachandran	South
Cricket Association of Uttarakhand	Uttarakhand	Jot Singh Gunsola	Central
Delhi & District Cricket Association	Delhi	Rohan Jaitley	North
Goa Cricket Association	Goa	Vipul Phadke	South
Gujarat Cricket Association	Gujarat (excluding Saurashtra and Vadodara)	Dhanraj Nathwani	West
Haryana Cricket Association	Haryana	Paramjit Mann	North
Himachal Pradesh Cricket Association	Himachal Pradesh	Arun Dhumal	North
Hyderabad Cricket Association	Telangana	Amarnath	South
Jammu & Kashmir Cricket Association	Jammu and Kashmir	Anil Gupta	North
Jharkhand State Cricket Association	Jharkhand	Sanjay Sahay	East
Karnataka State Cricket Association	Karnataka	Venkatesh Prasad	South
Kerala Cricket Association	Kerala	Jayesh George	South
Madhya Pradesh Cricket Association	Madhya Pradesh	Abhilash Khandekar	Central
Maharashtra Cricket Association	Maharashtra (excluding Mumbai and Vidarbha)	Rohit Rajendra Pawar	West
Manipur Cricket Association	Manipur	Nongthombam Zico Meetei	North East
Meghalaya Cricket Association	Meghalaya	Danny Marak	North East
Mumbai Cricket Association	Mumbai (Maharashtra)	Ajinkya Naik	West
Nagaland Cricket Association	Nagaland	Kechangulie Rio	North East
Odisha Cricket Association	Odisha	Pankaj Lochan Mohanty	East
Punjab Cricket Association	Punjab	Gulzar Inder Chahal	North
Railways Sports Promotion Board	Indian Railways	D. K. Gayen	Central
Rajasthan Cricket Association	Rajasthan	Vaibhav Gahlot	Central
Saurashtra Cricket Association	Saurashtra and Kutch (Gujarat)	Jaydev Shah	West
Services Sports Control Board	Indian Armed Forces	Varun Singh	North
Sikkim Cricket Association	Sikkim	Tika Subba	North East
Tamil Nadu Cricket Association	Tamil Nadu	Dr. P. Ashok Sigamani	South
Tripura Cricket Association	Tripura	Tapan Lodh	East
Union Territory Cricket Association	Chandigarh	Sanjay Tandon	North
Uttar Pradesh Cricket Association	Uttar Pradesh	Dr. Nidhipati Singhania	Central
Vidarbha Cricket Association	Vidarbha (Maharashtra)	Vinay Deshpande	Central

== See also ==
- BCCI domestic teams
- List of Indian state football associations
