= 2022–23 Senior Women's Inter Zonal One Day Trophy =

Domestic cricket competition

- Dates: 12 – 21 February 2023
- Administrator(s): BCCI
- Cricket format: 50-over cricket
- Tournament format(s): Round-robin tournament and final
- Host(s): India
- Champions: North Zone (1st title)
- Runners-up: Central Zone
- Participants: 6
- Matches: 16
- Most runs: Priyanka Bala (271)
- Most wickets: Ekta Bisht (17)
- Official website: bcci.tv

The 2022–23 Senior Women's Inter Zonal One Day Trophy was the inaugural edition of the Senior Women's Inter Zonal One-Day Trophy, a domestic one day cricket competition in India. The tournament took place from 12 to 21 February 2023, with six zonal teams taking part. The tournament followed the 2022–23 Women's Senior Inter Zonal T20 in being the first tournament involving women's zonal teams in India since the 2017–18 Senior Women's Cricket Inter Zonal Three Day Game. The tournament was won by North Zone, who beat Central Zone by 9 wickets in the final.

== Competition format ==
Six teams competed in the tournament, representing regions of India. Each team played each other once in a round-robin format. The top two teams in the group progressed to the final. Matches were played using a one-day format with 50 overs per side. Matches were played across three venues in or near Hyderabad: Rajiv Gandhi International Cricket Stadium, Gymkhana Ground and ECIL Ground.

The group worked on a points system with positions within the group being based on the total points. Points were awarded as follows:

Win: 4 points.
Tie: 2 points.
Loss: 0 points.
No Result/Abandoned: 2 points.

If points in the final table were equal, teams were separated by most wins, then head-to-head record, then Net Run Rate.

== Group stage ==
=== Points table ===
Team	P	W	L	T	NR	Pts	NRR
North Zone (Q)	5	5	0	0	0	20	+1.107
Central Zone (Q)	5	4	1	0	0	16	+1.870
East Zone	5	3	2	0	0	12	+0.362
South Zone	5	2	3	0	0	8	+0.394
West Zone	5	1	4	0	0	4	–0.249
North East Zone	5	0	5	0	0	0	–4.470

=== Fixtures ===
12 February 2023
Scorecard

Central Zone; 189 (48.1 overs)	v	North Zone; 191/5 (49.4 overs)
Nishu Choudhary 43 (43); Priya Mishra 3/37 (10 overs)		Taniya Bhatia 55* (71); Poonam Yadav 1/15 (10 overs)

North Zone won by 5 wickets
Rajiv Gandhi International Cricket Stadium, Hyderabad
Umpires: R Sundar and Durga Datta Das

- North Zone won the toss and elected to field.

12 February 2023
Scorecard

West Zone; 233 (48.1 overs)	v	South Zone; 234/5 (48.5 overs)
Jayu Jadeja 92 (104); Anusha Bareddy 4/29 (10 overs)		Gnanananda Divya 77 (85); Utkarsha Pawar 1/25 (5 overs)

South Zone won by 5 wickets
Gymkhana Ground, Secunderabad
Umpires: K Bharathan and Gayathri Venugopalan

- West Zone won the toss and elected to bat.

12 February 2023
Scorecard

East Zone; 274/4 (50 overs)	v	North East Zone; 124 (47.2 overs)
Priyanka Bala 128* (114); Lalhriat Puii 1/22 (4 overs)		Gangadevi Waikhom 44 (74); Priyanka Acharjee 3/16 (6 overs)

East Zone won by 150 runs
ECIL Ground, Hyderabad
Umpires: Vinod Ingle and R Subramanian Iyer

- East Zone won the toss and elected to bat.

13 February 2023
Scorecard

North East Zone; 95 (41.2 overs)	v	North Zone; 96/0 (17.5 overs)
Keisham Devi 27 (77); Amanjot Kaur 3/11 (6 overs)		Priya Punia 51* (52)

North Zone won by 10 wickets
Gymkhana Ground, Secunderabad
Umpires: R Sundar and R Subramanian Iyer

- North East Zone won the toss and elected to bat.

13 February 2023
Scorecard

East Zone; 252/6 (50 overs)	v	South Zone; 251 (47.5 overs)
Mita Paul 112* (154); Monica Patel 2/34 (5 overs)		Dinesh Vrinda 83 (78); Mita Paul 4/44 (8.5 overs)

East Zone won by 1 run
ECIL Ground, Hyderabad
Umpires: K Bharathan and Vinod Ingle

- East Zone won the toss and elected to bat.

13 February 2023
Scorecard

West Zone; 87 (37.5 overs)	v	Central Zone; 88/2 (18 overs)
Jayu Jadeja 33 (89); Ekta Bisht 4/5 (8.5 overs)		Mona Meshram 34* (34); Shraddha Pokharkar 1/21 (6 overs)

Central Zone won by 8 wickets
Rajiv Gandhi International Cricket Stadium, Hyderabad
Umpires: Gayathri Venugopalan and Durga Datta Das

- Central Zone won the toss and elected to field.

15 February 2023
Scorecard

North Zone; 247/2 (50 overs)	v	West Zone; 195 (48.1 overs)
Priya Punia 117* (150); Jaya Mohite 1/39 (6 overs)		Riya Chaudhari 107 (139); Priya Mishra 5/35 (10 overs)

North Zone won by 52 runs
ECIL Ground, Hyderabad
Umpires: Durga Datta Das and K Bharathan

- West Zone won the toss and elected to field.

15 February 2023
Scorecard

North East Zone; 98 (39.5 overs)	v	South Zone; 101/1 (8.2 overs)
Gangadevi Waikhom 39 (75); Minnu Mani 2/11 (6 overs)		Dinesh Vrinda 42* (18); Pranita Chettri 1/20 (2 overs)

South Zone won by 9 wickets
Gymkhana Ground, Secunderabad
Umpires: Vinod Ingle and R Subramanian Iyer

- North East Zone won the toss and elected to bat.

15 February 2023
Scorecard

Central Zone; 234/8 (50 overs)	v	East Zone; 177 (46.4 overs)
Mona Meshram 73 (86); Anuja Patil 3/47 (10 overs)		Dhara Gujjar 39 (68); Ekta Bisht 4/26 (9.4 overs)

Central Zone won by 57 runs
Rajiv Gandhi International Cricket Stadium, Hyderabad
Umpires: R Sundar and Gayathri Venugopalan

- East Zone won the toss and elected to field.

17 February 2023
Scorecard

East Zone; 217 (49.3 overs)	v	North Zone; 221/6 (45.1 overs)
Anuja Patil 55 (54); Parunika Sisodia 3/28 (10 overs)		Amanjot Kaur 78* (73); Priyanka Acharjee 2/35 (8 overs)

North Zone won by 4 wickets
ECIL Ground, Hyderabad
Umpires: R Sundar and K Bharathan

- North Zone won the toss and elected to field.

17 February 2023
Scorecard

South Zone; 203 (48 overs)	v	Central Zone; 204/3 (37.4 overs)
Dinesh Vrinda 67 (76); Swagatika Rath 3/38 (10 overs)		Shilpa Sahu 77 (96); Sundaresan Anusha 1/21 (5 overs)

Central Zone won by 7 wickets
Gymkhana Ground, Secunderabad
Umpires: Durga Datta Das and Gayathri Venugopalan

- South Zone won the toss and elected to bat.

17 February 2023
Scorecard

North East Zone; 66 (31.2 overs)	v	West Zone; 67/5 (11.3 overs)
Gangadevi Waikhom 28 (35); Shraddha Pokharkar 3/16 (7 overs)		Bhavana Goplani 33 (14); Leeza 2/9 (3 overs)

West Zone won by 5 wickets
Rajiv Gandhi International Cricket Stadium, Hyderabad
Umpires: R Subramanian Iyer and Vinod Ingle

- North East Zone won the toss and elected to bat.

19 February 2023
Scorecard

South Zone; 148 (38.4 overs)	v	North Zone; 149/5 (39 overs)
Monica Patel 56 (61); Sarla Devi 2/22 (4 overs)		Taniya Bhatia 48* (70); Sundaresan Anusha 3/30 (8 overs)

North Zone won by 5 wickets
Rajiv Gandhi International Cricket Stadium, Hyderabad
Umpires: Durga Datta Das and R Subramanian Iyer

- North Zone won the toss and elected to field.

19 February 2023
Scorecard

East Zone; 233/8 (50 overs)	v	West Zone; 212/8 (50 overs)
Dhara Gujjar 73 (99); Krutikaben Chaudhari 2/27 (10 overs)		Jayu Jadeja 67 (108); Priyanka Sarkar 4/22 (7 overs)

East Zone won by 21 runs
Gymkhana Ground, Secunderabad
Umpires: Vinod Ingle and K Bharathan

- West Zone won the toss and elected to field.

19 February 2023
Scorecard

North East Zone; 42 (30 overs)	v	Central Zone; 43/0 (6.3 overs)
Debasmita Dutta 12* (51); Ekta Bisht 8/10 (10 overs)		Jasia Akhtar 30* (22)

Central Zone won by 10 wickets
ECIL Ground, Hyderabad
Umpires: R Sundar and Gayathri Venugopalan

- North East Zone won the toss and elected to bat.

== Final ==
21 February 2023
Scorecard

Central Zone; 123 (42 overs)	v	North Zone; 124/1 (33.3 overs)
Swagatika Rath 20 (33); Parunika Sisodia 3/14 (7 overs)		Neena Chaudhary 53* (85); Suman Meena 1/9 (3 overs)

North Zone won by 9 wickets
Rajiv Gandhi International Cricket Stadium, Hyderabad
Umpires: Gayathri Venugopalan and K Bharathan

- North Zone won the toss and elected to field.

== Statistics ==
=== Most runs ===
Player	Team	Matches	Innings	Runs	Average	HS	100s	50s
Priyanka Bala	East Zone	5	5	271	67.75	128*	1	2
Priya Punia	North Zone	6	6	250	62.50	117*	1	1
Jayu Jadeja	West Zone	5	5	221	44.20	92	0	2
Dinesh Vrinda	South Zone	5	5	196	49.00	83	0	2
Mita Paul	East Zone	5	5	194	48.50	112*	1	1

Source: BCCI

=== Most wickets ===
Player	Team	Overs	Wickets	Average	5w
Ekta Bisht	Central Zone	55.3	17	7.76	1
Parunika Sisodia	North Zone	53.0	14	11.92	0
Priya Mishra	North Zone	47.0	12	15.75	1
Komalpreet Kaur	North Zone	44.3	9	16.22	0
Poonam Yadav	Central Zone	53.0	8	20.75	0

Source: BCCI
