= Anjali Sarvani =

Indian cricketer (born 1997)

Personal information
- Full name: Anjali Sarvani
- Born: 28 December 1997 (age 28); Adoni, Andhra Pradesh, India
- Batting: Left-handed
- Bowling: Left-arm medium
- Role: Bowler

International information
- National side: India (2022–present)
- T20I debut (cap 72): 9 December 2022 v Australia
- Last T20I: 19 January 2023 v South Africa
- T20I shirt no.: 28

Domestic team information
- Years: Team
- 2012/13–2019/20: Andhra
- 2020/21–present: Railways
- 2023: UP Warriorz

Career statistics
Competition	WT20I
Matches	1
Runs scored	–
Batting average	–
100s/50s	–
Top score	–
Balls bowled	24
Wickets	0
Bowling average	–
5 wickets in innings	–
10 wickets in match	–
Best bowling	–
Catches/stumpings	0/–
- Source: ESPNcricinfo, 21 January 2023

Anjali Sarvani (born 28 July 1997) is an Indian cricketer. She plays for Railways in domestic matches and the India women's national cricket team. She made her WT20I debut for India, against Australia, on 9 December 2022.

== Career ==
In 2012, she was selected for India U-19 women's cricket team. She played for Andhra between 2012–13 and 2019–20, before joining Railways. She was recognised as the best bowler when she played for South Zone against North Zone in the 2017–18 Senior Women's Cricket Inter Zonal Three Day Game. She has also been part of the India B cricket team. In 2020, she played for India B in the Women's T20 Quadrangular series in Patna.
