= Mandeep Kaur =

Mandeep Kaur may refer to:

- Mandeep Kaur (cricketer) (born 1988), Indian cricketer
- Mandeep Kaur (sprinter) (born 1988), Indian sprinter
- Mandeep Kaur (para-badminton), Indian para-badminton player
