= Jigna Gajjar =

Former cricketer/ coach (born 1982)

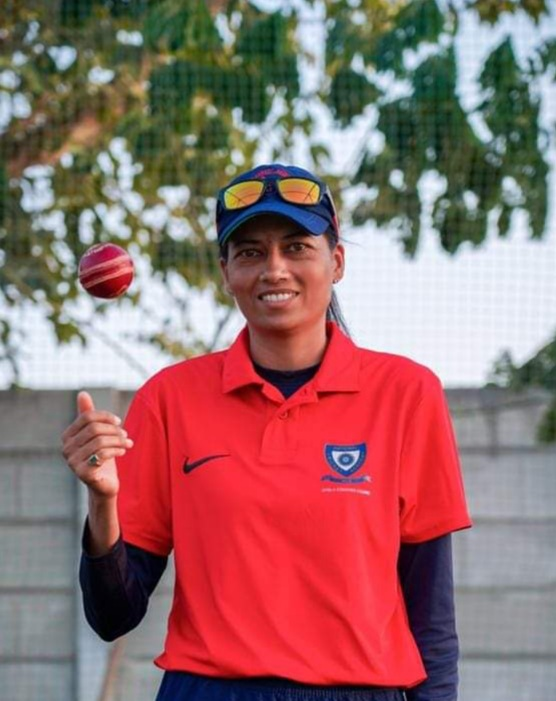

Personal information
- Full name: Jigna Gajjar
- Born: 28 September 1982 (age 43)
- Batting: Right-handed
- Bowling: Right-arm fast
- Role: Batter

Jigna Gajjar (born 28 September 1982) is a former Indian cricketer and cricket coach. She plays for West Zone.

Jigna Gajjar is member of west zone women's Cricket team from 2003 to 2008, and member of Indian Cricketer's Association (BCCI).

== Coaching career ==
Jigna has received several awards. She is doing social work for sports, especially cricket coaching for underprivileged children.
