= Inter-Zone Women's One Day Competition =

List A women's cricket competition

Inter Zone Women's One Day Competition
- Countries: India
- Administrator: BCCI
- Format: List-A cricket (50 overs per side)
- First edition: 2006–07
- Latest edition: 2013–14
- Tournament format: Round-robin tournament
- Number of teams: 5
- Most successful: Central Zone (7 titles)

The Inter Zone Women's One Day Competition was a List A women's cricket competition that took place in India between 2006–07 and 2013–14. The tournament involved five teams representing regions (or "zones") on India, playing in a round-robin 50-over league. The tournament was the successor to the Rani Jhansi Trophy, which ran until 2002–03 and also involved zonal sides, and was replaced by the Senior Women's Cricket Inter Zonal Three Day Game, a first-class competition using the same teams.

The most successful side in the history of the competition was Central Zone, who won 7 out of the 8 titles. North Zone won the other title, in 2011–12.

In 2022–23, a similar, expanded tournament was created, in the form of the 2022–23 Women's Senior Inter Zonal One Day.

== Teams ==
Team	Wins	Runners-up
Central Zone	7	1
East Zone	0	0
North Zone	1	2
South Zone	0	2
West Zone	0	3

== Tournament results ==
Season	Winners	Runners-up	Ref
2006–07	Central Zone	South Zone	
2007–08	Central Zone	West Zone	
2008–09	Central Zone	West Zone	
2009–10	Central Zone	North Zone	
2010–11	Central Zone	West Zone	
2011–12	North Zone	Central Zone	
2012–13	Central Zone	South Zone	
2013–14	Central Zone	North Zone	
