= Kavita Patil (cricketer) =

Indian cricketer

Personal information
- Full name: Kavita Dilip Patil
- Born: 27 October 1988 (age 38); Solapur, Maharashtra, India
- Batting: Right-handed
- Bowling: Right-arm medium

Domestic team information
- Years: Team
- 2013–2019: Railways
- 2009–2017: Maharashtra
- 2011–2012: West Zone
- Source: ESPNcricinfo, 20 February 2020

Kavita Dilip Patil (born 27 October 1988) is a Maharashtrian cricketer. She is a right-handed batter and bowls right-arm medium pace. She played for Maharashtra, Railways, West Zone and Central Zone. She made her debut in major domestic cricket on 3 November 2009 in a one-day match against Saurashtra. She has played 4 First-class, 57 List A and 49 Women's Twenty20 cricket matches.
