= North Zone women's cricket team =

Women's cricket team that represents northern India

North Zone
Personnel
- Captain: Shafali Verma

Team information
- Established: 1974

History
- First-class debut: East Zone in 2015 at Eden Gardens, Kolkata
- IZODC wins: 1
- IZ3D wins: 1
- IZT20 wins: 0
- IZOD wins: 1

The North Zone women's cricket team is a women's cricket team that represents northern India in the Women's Senior Inter Zonal One Day and Women's Senior Inter Zonal T20. It is a composite team of players from five teams from northern India: Delhi, Haryana, Himachal Pradesh, Jammu and Kashmir and Punjab. They were formed in 1974–75 to play in the Rani Jhansi Trophy, which they competed in until 2002–03, when the competition ended. They then competed in the Inter Zone Women's One Day Competition, which they won once, in 2011–12, and then in the Inter Zone Women's Three Day Competition, in which they won the final edition of the tournament, in 2017–18. They won the inaugural edition of the Women's Senior Inter Zonal One Day in 2022–23.

== History ==
North Zone Women first played in the Rani Jhansi Trophy in the 1974–75 season, a List A competition. They competed in the tournament until it was dissolved after the 2002–03 season, but full results for the trophy are not recorded.

In 2007, North Zone began playing in the Inter Zone Women's One Day Competition, which they competed in between the 2006–07 season until it ended after the 2013–14 season. The side won the title once, in 2011–12, and were the only side to break Central Zone's winning streak, who won the other 7 titles. In 2011–12, North Zone topped the table with four wins from their four matches.

In the 2014–15 season, the zonal teams began competing in a two-day competition, the Inter Zone Women's Two Day Competition. The side finished 3rd in the first season before finishing bottom the following season, when the tournament became a three-day competition. They again finished third in 2016–17, but did win their first match in the tournament, against South Zone. In 2017–18, North Zone won their first three-day title, breaking Central Zone's three season winning streak and topping the table with two wins from their four matches.

In 2022–23, zonal cricket in India returned, in the form of the Women's Senior Inter Zonal T20. They finished fourth out of sixth teams in the first edition of the tournament. In February 2023, the 2022–23 Women's Senior Inter Zonal One Day tournament took place, with North Zone winning the competition, topping the group before beating Central Zone in the final by 9 wickets.

== Players ==
=== Current squad ===
Based on squad announced for the 2023–24 season. Players in bold have international caps.

| Name | Nationality | Domestic team | Notes | | | | |
|---|---|---|---|---|---|---|---|
| Name | Nationality | Domestic team | Notes | **Shafali Verma** | India | Haryana | Captain |
| **Taniya Bhatia** | India | Punjab | Wicket-keeper | | | | |
| Neelam Bisht | India | Punjab | | | | | |
| **Harleen Deol** | India | Himachal Pradesh | | | | | |
| Madhu Dhama | India | Delhi | | | | | |
| Kashvee Gautam | India | Chandigarh | | | | | |
| Suman Gulia | India | Haryana | | | | | |
| Mannat Kashyap | India | Punjab | | | | | |
| Amandeep Kaur | India | Haryana | | | | | |
| **Amanjot Kaur** | India | Punjab | | | | | |
| Parushi Prabhakar | India | Chandigarh | | | | | |
| Shweta Sehrawat | India | Delhi | | | | | |
| Chitra Singh | India | Himachal Pradesh | | | | | |
| Parunika Sisodia | India | Delhi | | | | | |
| **Sushma Verma** | India | Himachal Pradesh | Wicket-keeper | | | | |

== Seasons ==
=== Inter Zone Women's Three Day Competition ===
| Season | League standings | | | | | | | | | Notes |
| Season | P | W | L | DWF | DLF | ND | BP | Pts | Pos | Notes |
|---|---|---|---|---|---|---|---|---|---|---|
| 2014–15 | 4 | 0 | 0 | 1 | 2 | 1 | 0 | 6 | 3rd | |
| 2015–16 | 4 | 0 | 1 | 0 | 3 | 0 | 0 | 3 | 5th | |
| 2016–17 | 4 | 1 | 0 | 0 | 3 | 0 | 0 | 9 | 3rd | |
| 2017–18 | 4 | 2 | 2 | 0 | 0 | 0 | 1 | 19 | 1st | Champions |

=== Women's Senior Inter Zonal T20 ===
| Season | League standings | | | | | | | | Notes |
| Season | P | W | L | T | NR | NRR | Pts | Pos | Notes |
|---|---|---|---|---|---|---|---|---|---|
| 2022–23 | 5 | 2 | 3 | 0 | 0 | +0.630 | 8 | 4th | |
| 2023–24 | 5 | 2 | 2 | 0 | 1 | +1.341 | 10 | 4th | |

=== Women's Senior Inter Zonal One Day ===
| Season | League standings | | | | | | | | Notes |
| Season | P | W | L | T | NR | NRR | Pts | Pos | Notes |
|---|---|---|---|---|---|---|---|---|---|
| 2022–23 | 5 | 5 | 0 | 0 | 0 | +1.107 | 20 | 1st | Champions |

== Honours ==
- Inter Zone Women's One Day Competition:
  - Winners (1): 2011–12
- Senior Women's Cricket Inter Zonal Three Day Game:
  - Winners (1): 2017–18
- Women's Senior Inter Zonal T20:
  - Winners (0):
  - Best finish: 4th (2022–23)
- Women's Senior Inter Zonal One Day:
  - Winners (1): 2022–23
