= Luwangpokpa Cricket Stadium =

Cricket stadium in Imphal, Manipur, India

Coordinates: 24°52′0″N 93°55′24″E

- Location: Imphal, Manipur
- Establishment: 2012
- Capacity: 12,000
- Owner: Government of Manipur
- Architect: n/a
- Operator: Manipur Cricket Association
- Tenants: Manipur cricket team
- End names
- n/a
- As of 26 August 2015; Source: CricketArchive

Luwangpokpa Cricket Stadium is a cricket stadium in Imphal, Manipur. The stadium was established in 2008 when they hosted a match of Vijay Merchant Trophy between Manipur Under-16s and Bengal Under-16s. The stadium along with Khuman Lampak Main Stadium are one of the two stadium in Manipur that has hosted cricket matches and has got turf wicket. As Khuman Lampak Main Stadium is being used for various sport and is no being used, the Luwangpokpa Cricket Stadium became the main venue for cricket in the state. BCCI’s New Area Development Programme has reviewed the stadium in 2012 for its ability to host matches.
