= Neha Chavda =

Indian cricketer

Neha Harsukh Chavda (born 13 March 1993) is an Indian cricketer. She plays for Saurashtra and West Zone. She has played 4 First-class matches, 41 Limited over matches and 36 Women's Twenty20.
