= Mandeep Kaur (cricketer) =

Indian cricketer (born 1988)

Mandeep Kaur (born 8 September 1988) is a Delhiite cricketer. She initially played for Assam and East zone, Since 2012 she has played for Delhi and North zone. She has played four First-class, fifty List A and thirty-one Twenty20 matches.
