= North East Zone women's cricket team =

Indian women's cricket team

North East Zone
Personnel
- Captain: Limatola Ao

Team information
- Established: 2022

History
- IZT20 wins: 0
- IZOD wins: 0

The North East Zone women's cricket team is a women's cricket team that represents north east India in the Women's Senior Inter Zonal One Day and Senior Women's Inter Zonal T20. It is a composite team of players from six teams from north east India: Arunachal Pradesh, Manipur, Meghalaya, Mizoram, Nagaland and Sikkim. They were formed in 2022 to compete in the inaugural Women's Inter Zonal T20 competition.

== History ==
Before the 2022–23 season, inter zonal cricket in India had consisted of five teams, representing the Central, East, North, South and West zones. With the addition of Arunachal Pradesh, Manipur, Meghalaya, Mizoram, Nagaland and Sikkim to the BCCI ahead of the 2018–19 season, a new zone was required when zonal cricket returned in 2022–23. Therefore, the North East Zone cricket team was created in both men's and women's cricket. The North East Zone women's cricket team first competed at the inaugural inter zonal T20 competition, the 2022–23 Women's Senior Inter Zonal T20. They finished sixth in the tournament, losing all of their matches. In February 2023, the 2022–23 Women's Senior Inter Zonal One Day tournament took place, in which they again finished sixth, losing all of their matches.

== Players ==
=== Current squad ===
Based on squad announced for the 2023–24 season. Players in bold have international caps.

Name	Nationality	Domestic team	Notes				
Name	Nationality	Domestic team	Notes	Limatola Ao	India	Nagaland	Captain
Alemienla Bendangyanger	India	Nagaland					
Pranita Chettri	India	Sikkim					
Koijam Devi	India	Manipur					
Debasmita Dutta	India	Meghalaya					
Purnimaya Gurung	India	Sikkim					
Sentilemla Imsong	India	Nagaland					
Keisham Kalpana	India	Manipur					
Sariba Khan	India	Nagaland					
Haorungbam Kiranbala	India	Manipur					
Tshering Lepcha	India	Sikkim					
Rajkumari Linthoingambi	India	Manipur					
Rin Mawii	India	Mizoram					
Riticia Nongbet	India	Meghalaya					
Ajima Sangma	India	Meghalaya					
Luiza Tamang	India	Meghalaya					
Jyoti Thapa	India	Nagaland	Wicket-keeper				
Nabam Yapu	India	Arunachal Pradesh					
Lal Zuali	India	Mizoram					

== Seasons ==
=== Women's Senior Inter Zonal T20 ===
Season	League standings								Notes
Season	P	W	L	T	NR	NRR	Pts	Pos	Notes
2022–23	5	0	5	0	0	–5.250	0	6th	
2023–24	5	0	5	0	0	–4.778	0	6th	

=== Women's Senior Inter Zonal One Day ===
Season	League standings								Notes
Season	P	W	L	T	NR	NRR	Pts	Pos	Notes
2022–23	5	0	5	0	0	–4.470	0	6th	
