= Reena Dabhi =

Indian cricketer (born 1994)

Reena Bharat Dabhi (born 24 March 1994) is an Indian cricketer. She plays for Saurashtra and West Zone. She has played 3 First-class matches, 29 Limited over matches and 28 Women's Twenty20.
