= Jayshree Jadeja =

Indian cricketer (born 1992)

Jayshreeba Bhikhubha Jadeja (born 9 January 1992) is an Indian cricketer. She plays for Saurashtra and West Zone. She has played 1 First-class, 36 List A and 35 Women's Twenty20 matches. She made her debut in major domestic cricket on 21 November 2008 in a one-day match against Maharashtra.
