= Tanusree Sarkar =

Indian cricketer (born 1998)

Personal information
- Full name: Tanusree Makhanlal Sarkar
- Born: 5 September 1998 (age 28); North Parganas, Bengal, India
- Nickname: SARKAR,TM
- Batting: Right-handed
- Bowling: Right-arm medium

Domestic team information
- Years: Team
- 2014–present: Bengal
- 2015–2018: East zone
- Source: Cricinfo, 20 February 2020

Tanusree Makhanlal Sarkar (born 5 September 1998) is a Bengali cricketer. She plays for Bengal and East zone in the national domestic cricket circuit. She has played 4 First-class, 10 List A and 14 Women's Twenty20 matches. She made her debut in major domestic cricket on 6 December 2014 in a one-day match against Hyderabad.
