= Central Zone women's cricket team =

Central Zone
Personnel
- Captain: Ekta Bisht

Team information
- Established: 1974

History
- First-class debut: East Zone in 2015 at Eden Gardens, Kolkata
- IZODC wins: 7
- IZ3D wins: 3
- IZT20 wins: 1
- IZOD wins: 0

The Central Zone women's cricket team is a women's cricket team that represents Central India in the Women's Senior Inter Zonal One Day and Women's Senior Inter Zonal T20. It is a composite team of players from six teams from Central India: Chhattisgarh, Madhya Pradesh, Railways, Rajasthan, Uttar Pradesh and Vidarbha. They were formed in 1974–75 to play in the Rani Jhansi Trophy, which they competed in until 2002–03, when the competition ended. They then competed in the Inter Zone Women's One Day Competition between 2006–07 and 2013–14, which they won 7 out of 8 times, and the Inter Zone Women's Three Day Competition between 2014–15 and 2017–18, which they won 3 out of 4 times. They won the inaugural edition of the Inter Zonal T20 in 2022–23.

== History ==
Central Zone Women first played in the Rani Jhansi Trophy in the 1974–75 season, a List A competition. They competed in the tournament until it was dissolved after the 2002–03 season, but full results for the trophy are not recorded.

In 2007, Central Zone began playing in the Inter Zone Women's One Day Competition, which they competed in between the 2006–07 season until it ended after the 2013–14 season. The side were the most successful side in the history of the competition, winning the title 7 times out of 8 seasons, only missing out in 2011–12, in which they finished as runners-up. They were also unbeaten in every season except 2011–12, in which they only lost to eventual winners North Zone.

In the 2014–15 season, the zonal teams began competing in a two-day competition, the Inter Zone Women's Two Day Competition. In the first season, Central Zone won the tournament, with 3 drawn games won on first innings from four matches. The following season, 2015–16, the tournament became a three-day competition but Central Zone emerged as champions again, with one win and two drawn games won on first innings. They were again champions in 2016–17, with two wins and one two drawn games won on first innings. In 2017–18, however, Central Zone failed to defend their title, finishing fourth with one win and two losses.

In 2022–23, zonal cricket in India returned, in the form of the Women's Senior Inter Zonal T20. Central Zone went unbeaten throughout the competition to win the title. In February 2023, the 2022–23 Women's Senior Inter Zonal One Day tournament took place, in which they finished second in the initial group stage before losing to North Zone in the final.

== Players ==
=== Current squad ===
Based on squad announced for the 2023–24 season. Players in bold have international caps.

| Name | Nationality | Domestic team | Notes | | | | |
|---|---|---|---|---|---|---|---|
| Name | Nationality | Domestic team | Notes | **Ekta Bisht** | India | Uttarakhand | Captain |
| Jasia Akhtar | India | Rajasthan | | | | | |
| Raghvi Bist | India | Uttarakhand | | | | | |
| Kaushalya Choudhary | India | Rajasthan | | | | | |
| Nishu Choudhary | India | Uttar Pradesh | | | | | |
| **Rajeshwari Gayakwad** | India | Railways | | | | | |
| Arushi Goel | India | Delhi | | | | | |
| **Dayalan Hemalatha** | India | Railways | | | | | |
| Tanuja Kanwer | India | Railways | | | | | |
| Disha Kasat | India | Vidarbha | | | | | |
| Poonam Khemnar | India | Madhya Pradesh | | | | | |
| Aparna Mondal | India | Railways | | | | | |
| **Sneh Rana** | India | Railways | | | | | |
| **Punam Raut** | India | Railways | | | | | |
| **Meghna Singh** | India | Railways | | | | | |
| Nikita Singh | India | Madhya Pradesh | | | | | |
| **Renuka Singh** | India | Railways | | | | | |
| **Pooja Vastrakar** | India | Madhya Pradesh | | | | | |
| **Poonam Yadav** | India | Railways | | | | | |

== Seasons ==
=== Inter Zone Women's Three Day Competition ===
| Season | League standings | | | | | | | | | Notes |
| Season | P | W | L | DWF | DLF | ND | BP | Pts | Pos | Notes |
|---|---|---|---|---|---|---|---|---|---|---|
| 2014–15 | 4 | 0 | 0 | 3 | 1 | 0 | 0 | 10 | 1st | Champions |
| 2015–16 | 4 | 1 | 0 | 2 | 1 | 0 | 1 | 14 | 1st | Champions |
| 2016–17 | 4 | 2 | 0 | 2 | 0 | 0 | 1 | 19 | 1st | Champions |
| 2017–18 | 4 | 1 | 2 | 0 | 1 | 0 | 0 | 7 | 4th | |

=== Women's Senior Inter Zonal T20 ===
| Season | League standings | | | | | | | | Notes |
| Season | P | W | L | T | NR | NRR | Pts | Pos | Notes |
|---|---|---|---|---|---|---|---|---|---|
| 2022–23 | 5 | 5 | 0 | 0 | 0 | +2.472 | 20 | 1st | Champions |
| 2023–24 | 5 | 2 | 2 | 0 | 1 | +1.250 | 10 | 3rd | |

=== Women's Senior Inter Zonal One Day ===
| Season | League standings | | | | | | | | Notes |
| Season | P | W | L | T | NR | NRR | Pts | Pos | Notes |
|---|---|---|---|---|---|---|---|---|---|
| 2022–23 | 5 | 4 | 1 | 0 | 0 | +1.870 | 16 | 2nd | Lost in final |

== Honours ==
- Inter Zone Women's One Day Competition:
  - Winners (7): 2006–07, 2007–08, 2008–09, 2009–10, 2010–11, 2012–13 & 2013–14
- Inter Zone Women's Three Day Competition:
  - Winners (3): 2014–15, 2015–16 & 2016–17
- Women's Senior Inter Zonal T20:
  - Winners (1): 2022–23
- Women's Senior Inter Zonal One Day:
  - Winners (0):
  - Best finish: Runners-up (2022–23)
