= Snehal Jadhav =

Indian cricketer

Personal information
- Full name: Snehal Pramod Jadhav
- Born: 17 October 1989 (age 37); Pune, Maharashtra, India
- Batting: Right-handed
- Role: Wicket-keeper-batter

Domestic team information
- Years: Team
- 2008–2015: Maharashtra
- Source: Cricinfo, 4 March 2021

Snehal Pramod Jadhav (born 17 October 1989) is a retired Indian cricketer who plays for Maharashtra in domestic cricket. She is a right handed wicket-keeper-batter.

== Domestic career ==
She has played 1 First-class, 37 List A and 31 Women's Twenty20 matches. She has represented West Zone, Hyderabad, Odisha, and Maharashtra. She retired from cricket on 2015.

== Personal life ==
She married Indian cricketer Kedar Jadhav on 25 June 2011. The couple have a daughter, born on 2015.
