= Mugdha Joshi =

Indian cricketer

Personal information
- Full name: Mugdha Vilas Joshi
- Born: 10 November 1993 (age 33); Ahmednagar, Maharashtra, India
- Batting: Right-handed
- Bowling: Right-arm medium
- Role: Batter

Domestic team information
- Years: Team
- 2012/13–2019/20: Mumbai
- 2020/21–present: Pondicherry

Career statistics
Competition	FC	LA	T20
Matches	11	47	35
Runs scored	424	648	346
Batting average	26.50	18.00	18.21
100s/50s	0/3	0/0	0/0
Top score	73	47	41
Balls bowled	16	12	6
Wickets	0	0	0
Bowling average	–	–	–
5 wickets in innings	–	–	–
10 wickets in match	–	–	–
Best bowling	–	–	–
Catches/stumpings	7/–	10/–	14/–
- Source: CricketArchive, 25 July 2021

Mugdha Vilas Joshi (born 10 November 1993) is an Indian cricketer who plays as a right-handed batter. She currently plays for, and captains, Pondicherry. She has previously played for Mumbai, and West Zone in the Inter Zone Three Day Competition.
