= Services Sports Control Board =

Indian Armed Forces sports board

- Sport: Multi-sport
- Category: Military sports
- Jurisdiction: Services
- Membership: IMSC
- Abbreviation: SSCB
- Founded: 1919
- Affiliation: AAI; AFI; AICF; AIFF; AITA; BAI; BCCI; BFI; BoxFI; BSFI; CFI; HFI; HI; IPF; IWF; JFI; NRAI; SFI; TTFI; VFI; WFI
- Headquarters: 'A' Block, Defence Offices Complex, KG Marg Armed Forces Headquarters, Ministry of Defence
- Location: New Delhi, India

Official website
- sscbindia.in

Services Sports Control Board (SSCB) is a sports board run by the Indian Armed Forces. It was formed in 1919 as the Army Sports Control Board and later renamed to Services Sports Control Board. The board is represented as Services in the National Games of India, Durand Cup, and multiple regional sports events. It has been one of the leading medal winners in the National Games.

As a member of the Board of Control for Cricket in India, it governs the sport of cricket in the Indian Armed Forces and administers the Services cricket team. In addition to having several other sports departments, it is also an associate member of the All India Football Federation and administers the Services football team.

The organization was first started as the Army Sports Control Board in March 1919, on the same lines as the ASCB in the United Kingdom. The sports organizations of the three services were amalgamated on 3 April 1945 with the approval of the then Commander-in-Chief and the Services Sports Control Board.

== Teams ==
The teams of Indian Armed Forces are selected by the SSCB (Services Sports Control Board). These teams are fielded and represented as the Services team in the National Games of India, the World Military Games and various other international sporting events, including the Olympics.

== Organizational structure ==
In 1947, the Chiefs of Staff Committee approved the reconstitution of the Services Sports Control Board. The three services would run the Services Sports Control Board in rotation for a period of tenure. The tenure involves the change of president and secretary every three years. Presently from 2023, the administering service is Indian Navy.

Commodore Varun Singh of the Indian Navy is the current serving secretary of the SSCB.

=== SSCB secretaries (1945–present) ===
S.No.	Rank	Name	Term began	Term ended
1	Lieutenant Colonel	B. H. G. Tucher, MBE	April 1945	September 1945
2	Lieutenant Colonel	G. S. Grimston	October 1945	September 1946
3	Lieutenant Colonel	H. L. Rodwell	October 1946	March 1947
4	Lieutenant Colonel	A. E. Wernicke, OBE	April 1947	August 1947
5	Major	Ed Wilfried	January 1949	March 1950
6	Major	Swami	April 1950	June 1950
7	Major	Lachhman Singh	July 1950	June 1954
8	Squadron Leader	D. L. Springett	June 1954	February 1955
9	Wing Commander	K. L. Khanna	February 1955	November 1958
10	Commander	F. Pereira	November 1958	January 1962
11	Lieutenant Colonel	K. C. Anand	June 1962	November 1962
12	Lieutenant Colonel	H. R. Adhikari	July 1963	March 1966
13	Wing Commander	M. Mal	April 1966	August 1967
14	Wing Commander	R. S. Dhindsa	April 1967	March 1970
15	Commander	G. Nandy Singh	April 1970	March 1974
16	Lieutenant Colonel	D. N. Devine Jones	April 1974	April 1976
17	Major	Darshan Singh	April 1976	April 1977
17	Lieutenant Colonel	Darshan Singh	April 1977	April 1978
18	Wing Commander	S. Durrani, VSM	April 1978	March 1982
19	Commander	T. Mishra, VSM	April 1982	July 1985
20	Commander	J. Siga	April 1985	April 1986
21	Lieutenant Colonel	G. R. C. Nair, VSM	May 1986	March 1990
22	Wing Commander	G. S. Shaktawat	April 1990	October 1992
22	Group Captain	G. S. Shaktawat	October 1992	March 1994
23	Commander	K. S. Randhawa, SC, YSM, NM	April 1994	March 1998
24	Colonel	G. A. Siddique	April 1998	May 2000
25	Colonel	Amar Dass Sharma	May 2000	March 2002
26	Wing Commander	A. K. Jha, ASM	April 2001	August 2003
27	Wing Commander	M. Baladitya	December 2003	May 2005
28	Captain	Sukhdev Singh Virk, NM	May 2005	January 2006
29	Colonel	V. S. Kandari, VSM	February 2006	June 2008
30	Colonel	P. K. Muralidharan Raja, SM	June 2008	January 2009
31	Captain	U. K. Thapa, VSM	February 2009	February 2011
(27)	Group Captain	M. Baladitya, VSM	February 2011	April 2011
(27)	Air Commodore	M. Baladitya, VSM	April 2011	January 2013
33	Group Captain	R. K. Raksha	February 2013	February 2014
34	Commodore	P. K. Garg	May 2014	April 2017
(31)	Colonel	U. K. Thapa, VSM	February 2009	February 2011
35	Group Captain	M. K. Mishra, VSM	May 2020	25 July 2021
36	Group Captain	Dinesh Suri	26 July 2021	31 March 2023
37	Commodore	Varun Singh, SC	1 April 2023	todate

== Services teams ==
=== Cricket ===
- Services cricket team

=== Football ===
- Services football team
- Army Green football team
- Army Red football team
- Indian Air Force football team
- Indian Navy Sports Club

== See also ==
- Indian Armed Forces
- Ministry of Defence
- Railways Sports Promotion Board
- Sports Authority of India
