= Soni Yadav =

Indian cricketer (born 1994)

Personal information
- Full name: Soni Yadav
- Born: 24 March 1994 (age 32); Ghaziabad, Uttar Pradesh, India
- Batting: Right-handed
- Bowling: Right-arm medium
- Role: Bowler

International information
- National side: India
- Only ODI (cap 119): 7 February, 2017 v Sri Lanka

Domestic team information
- Years: Team
- 2012/13-2015/16: Delhi women's
- 2012/13-: North Zone women's
- 2016/17: Railways women's
- Source: Cricinfo, 23 January, 2020

Soni Yadav (born 25 March 1994) is an Indian cricketer. She is a right-handed batter who bowls right-arm medium pace. She has played domestic cricket for Delhi, North Zone and Railways. She made her Women's One Day International cricket (WODI) debut against Sri Lanka in the 2017 Women's Cricket World Cup Qualifier on 7 February 2017.
