= Madhusmita Behera =

Indian cricketer

Personal information
- Full name: Madhusmita Behera
- Born: 4 October 1990 (age 36); Cuttack, Odisha
- Batting: Right-handed
- Bowling: Right-arm off-break
- Role: All Rounder

Domestic team information
- Years: Team
- 2006/17: Odisha
- 2006/16: East Zone
- First-class debut: 18 February 2015 East Zone v North Zone
- Last First-class: 14 March 2016 East Zone v South Zone
- List A debut: 1 December 2006 Orissa v Jharkhand
- Last List A: 24 October 2016 India Blue v India Green
- Source: CricketArchive, 22 January 2017

Madhusmita Behera (born 4 October 1990) is an Indian cricketer. She is a right-handed batter who bowls right-arm off-break. She plays for Odisha and East Zone. She has played 8 First-class, 71 List A and 43 Women's Twenty20.
