= Sanjula Naik =

Indian cricketer (born 1996)

Sanjula Sudhakar Naik (born 6 October 1996) is a Goan cricketer. She plays for Goa and made her debut in major domestic cricket on 6 December 2014 in a one-day match against Rajasthan. She has played 16 List A and 19 Women's Twenty20 matches.
