= Cricket Association of Mizoram =

Cricket organization in Mizoram, India

- Sport: Cricket
- Jurisdiction: Mizoram, India
- Abbreviation: CAM
- Founded: 1992
- Affiliation: Board of Control for Cricket in India
- Location: Aizawl, Mizoram, India
- President: Lalrochhuanga Pachuau
- Secretary: P Lalremruata
- Coach: Mohammad Saif
- (India)

Cricket Association of Mizoram is the governing body for cricket activities in the Mizoram state of India and for the Mizoram cricket team. It is a full member of the Board of Control for Cricket in India.

== History ==
The Cricket Association of Mizoram was established in 1992. The Association regularly applied for BCCI membership but could not get it. Among the north-east teams, before 2018, Mizoram was the only state without BCCI associate status. In 2008, after Lodha Panel ordered "One state, one vote" reforms, north east states were expected to play in the 2017–18 senior domestic season but BCCI ignored the reforms order. After a long legal battle, in July 2018, BCCI granted the association full member status and the team made its senior-level debut in the 2018–19 season.
