= Sneha Deepthi =

Indian cricketer

Personal information
- Full name: Vootala Sneha Deepthi
- Born: 10 September 1996 (age 30); Visakhapatnam, Andhra Pradesh, India
- Batting: Right-handed
- Bowling: Right-arm off break
- Role: Batter

International information
- National side: India (2013)
- Only ODI (cap 108): 12 April 2013 v Bangladesh
- ODI shirt no.: 7
- T20I debut (cap 38): 2 April 2013 v Bangladesh
- Last T20I: 5 April 2013 v Bangladesh

Domestic team information
- Years: Team
- 2008/09–2015/16: Andhra
- 2021/22–present: Andhra
- 2023–present: Delhi Capitals

Career statistics
Competition	WODI	WT20I
Matches	1	2
Runs scored	4	1
Batting average	4.00	1.00
100s/50s	0/0	0/0
Top score	4	1
Catches/stumpings	0/–	0/–
- Source: ESPNcricinfo, 28 July 2022

Vootala Sneha Deepthi (born 10 September 1996) is an Indian cricketer who plays for Andhra as a right-handed batter. She has played one One Day International and two Twenty20 Internationals for India in 2013, making her international debut in April 2013 in a T20I against Bangladesh.

== Biography ==
Sneha Deepthi was born in 1996 in Visakhapatnam, Andhra Pradesh. Although not interested in any kind of sport in her childhood, she started playing gully cricket along with her father and brother. At the insistence of her father, an employee of the Visakhapatnam Steel Plant, she started to play the game seriously, and by the time she reached fourth grade she started taking coaching classes. Her father enrolled Sneha Deepthi and her younger sister Ramya Deepika to a summer coaching camp. The family shifted from Ukkunagaram (Visakhapatnam Steel Plant) to Pothinamallayya Palem, another suburb of Visakhapatnam, in order to ensure that they receive proper training under their coach Krishna Rao and make use of the facilities at the Dr. Y.S. Rajasekhara Reddy ACA-VDCA Cricket Stadium.

In 2013, Deepthi became the first cricketer from the Andhra women's cricket team to score a double century; she made 203 not out against East Godavari in a senior women inter-district match. She was selected for the national team for the 2012–13 home series against Bangladesh. At 16 years and 204 days, Deepthi became the youngest player to represent the national team in Women's Twenty20 International cricket. In August 2015, she made 350 against Srikakulam, the highest individual score by a woman cricketer for Andhra Cricket Association (ACA), against Srikakulam in a league match of ACA North Zone inter-district women's tournament. She also picked up two wickets for four runs in the match.

Deepthi took a break from cricket to get married and give birth to her first child: she returned to playing for, and captaining, Andhra for the 2021–22 season.

She made news as a mother of a 2-year-old child when she was picked up by Delhi Capitals for the inaugural WPL in 2023; she was retained by them for the 2024 season.
