= Sukanya Parida =

Indian cricketer (born 1993)

Personal information
- Full name: Sukanya Parida
- Born: 15 May 1993 (age 33); Naamouza, Kendrapara, Odisha, India
- Batting: Right-handed
- Bowling: Right-arm medium
- Role: Bowler

International information
- National side: India
- Only ODI (cap 117): 16 November 2016 v West Indies

Domestic team information
- Years: Team
- 2012/13–2016/17: Bengal
- 2018/19–2019/20: Railways
- 2021/22–present: Bengal

Career statistics
Competition	WODI
Matches	1
Runs scored	–
Batting average	–
100s/50s	–
Top score	–
Balls bowled	30
Wickets	0
Bowling average	–
5 wickets in innings	0
10 wickets in match	0
Best bowling	–
Catches/stumpings	0/–
- Source: Cricinfo, 5 December 2023

Sukanya Parida (born 15 May 1993) is an Indian cricketer from Odisha. She plays for Bengal in domestic matches.

She made her international debut in 2016 against West Indies.
