= Cricket Association of Pondicherry =

Cricket organization in Pondicherry, India

- Sport: Cricket
- Membership: Puducherry State Sports Council
- Abbreviation: CAP
- Founded: 2003
- Affiliation: BCCI
- Headquarters: Puducherry
- Location: Puducherry
- President: G. Ramachandran
- CEO: Mayank A. Mehta
- Vice president(s): C. Aianarappane

Official website
- cap-cricket.com
- (India)

Cricket Association of Pondicherry (CAP) is the governing body for cricket in Puducherry, formerly known as Pondicherry. Puducherry is a Union Territory in India and for the Puducherry cricket team. On 27 October 2017, Supreme Court-appointed Committee of Administrators (CoA) granted Associate Membership of the Board of Control for Cricket in India (BCCI) to the Cricket Association of Puducherry (CAP). Prior to this, it was affiliated to Tamil Nadu Cricket Association (TNCA) as a District Association. In 2019, CAP was granted full membership of the BCCI.

== See also ==
- Board of Cricket Control in India
