= Manipur Cricket Association =

Governing body of cricket in Manipur state, India

- Sport: Cricket
- Jurisdiction: Manipur
- Abbreviation: MNCA
- Founded: 1975
- Affiliation: Board of Control for Cricket in India
- Headquarters: Luwangsangbam
- Location: Manipur
- President: Nongthombam Zico Meetei
- Secretary: Lairenjam Geetranjan Singh

Official website
- mnca.tv
- Other key staff: 14
- (India)

Manipur Cricket Association is the governing body for cricket in the state of Manipur in India and organizes the Manipur cricket team. It is affiliated to the Board of Control for Cricket in India as a full member.

There is only one cricket stadium in Manipur, the Luwangpokpa Cricket Stadium in Imphal.
