= South Zone women's cricket team =

Southern India cricket team

South Zone
Personnel
- Captain: Shikha Pandey

Team information
- Established: 1974

History
- First-class debut: Young England in 1981 at Lal Bahadur Shastri Stadium, Hyderabad
- IZODC wins: 0
- IZ3D wins: 0
- IZT20 wins: 0
- IZOD wins: 0

The South Zone women's cricket team is a women's cricket team that represents southern India in the Women's Senior Inter Zonal One Day and Women's Senior Inter Zonal T20. It is a composite team of players from six teams from southern India: Andhra, Goa, Hyderabad, Karnataka, Kerala and Tamil Nadu. They were formed in 1974–75 to play in the Rani Jhansi Trophy, which they competed in until 2002–03, when the competition ended. They then competed in the Inter Zone Women's One Day Competition, and then in the Inter Zone Women's Three Day Competition, where they finished as runners-up in the final tournament, in 2017–18.

== History ==
South Zone Women first played in the Rani Jhansi Trophy in the 1974–75 season, a List A competition. They competed in the tournament until it was dissolved after the 2002–03 season, but full results for the trophy are not recorded.

In 2007, South Zone began playing in the Inter Zone Women's One Day Competition, which they competed in between the 2006–07 season until it ended after the 2013–14 season. Their best finishes in the tournament came in 2006–07 and 2012–13, when they finished as runners-up.

In the 2014–15 season, the zonal teams began competing in a two-day competition, the Inter Zone Women's Two Day Competition. In the first season, South Zone finished 4th out of the 5 teams with 6 points. The following season, 2015–16, the tournament became a three-day competition and South Zone finished 3rd, this time with 8 points. In 2016–17, the side finished bottom of the league, losing three of their four matches. They bounced back the following season however, taking their best finish in the competition as they came second, with two wins from their four matches.

In 2022–23, zonal cricket in India returned, in the form of the Women's Senior Inter Zonal T20. They finished third out of sixth teams in the first edition of the tournament. In February 2023, the 2022–23 Women's Senior Inter Zonal One Day tournament took place, in which they finished fourth in the group stage.

== Players ==
=== Current squad ===
Based on squad announced for the 2023–24 season. Players in bold have international caps.

Name	Nationality	Domestic team	Notes				
Name	Nationality	Domestic team	Notes	**Shikha Pandey**	India	Goa	Captain
Neeragattu Anusha	India	Andhra					
Sundaresan Anusha	India	Tamil Nadu					
**Anusha Bareddy**	India	Andhra					
Ganesh Divya	India	Kerala					
Vinod Drishya	India	Kerala					
Yuvashri Karthikeyan	India	Pondicherry					
**Minnu Mani**	India	Kerala					
Lakshminarayan Nethra	India	Tamil Nadu					
Vaishna Saibu	India	Kerala	Wicket-keeper				
Shabnam Shakil	India	Andhra					
Bhogi Shravani	India	Hyderabad					
Gongadi Trisha	India	Hyderabad					
Purvaja Verlekar	India	Goa					
Dinesh Vrinda	India	Karnataka					

== Seasons ==
=== Inter Zone Women's Three Day Competition ===
Season	League standings									Notes
Season	P	W	L	DWF	DLF	ND	BP	Pts	Pos	Notes
2014–15	4	0	0	1	2	1	0	6	4th	
2015–16	4	0	0	2	2	0	0	8	3rd	
2016–17	4	0	3	1	0	0	0	3	5th	
2017–18	4	2	1	0	1	0	0	13	2nd	

=== Women's Senior Inter Zonal T20 ===
Season	League standings								Notes
Season	P	W	L	T	NR	NRR	Pts	Pos	Notes
2022–23	5	3	2	0	0	+1.421	12	3rd	
2023–24	5	2	3	0	0	–0.154	8	5th	

=== Women's Senior Inter Zonal One Day ===
Season	League standings								Notes
Season	P	W	L	T	NR	NRR	Pts	Pos	Notes
2022–23	5	2	3	0	0	+0.394	8	4th	

== Honours ==
- Inter Zone Women's One Day Competition:
  - Winners (0):
  - Best finish: Runners-up (2006–07 & 2012–13)
- Senior Women's Cricket Inter Zonal Three Day Game:
  - Winners (0):
  - Best finish: Runners-up (2017–18)
- Women's Senior Inter Zonal T20:
  - Winners (0):
  - Best finish: 3rd (2022–23)
- Women's Senior Inter Zonal One Day:
  - Winners (0):
  - Best finish: 4th (2022–23)
