= Yastika Bhatia =

Indian cricketer (born 2000)

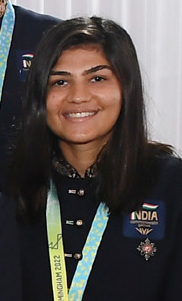
- Bhatia in August 2022

Personal information
- Full name: Yastika Harish Bhatia
- Born: 1 November 2000 (age 26); Vadodara, Gujarat, India
- Batting: Left-handed
- Role: Wicket-keeper batter

International information
- National side: India
- Test debut (cap 89): 30 September 2021 v Australia
- Last Test: 13 July 2026 v England
- ODI debut (cap 132): 21 September 2021 v Australia
- Last ODI: 24 September 2022 v England
- ODI shirt no.: 19
- T20I debut (cap 68): 7 October 2021 v Australia
- Last T20I: 21 June 2026 v South Africa
- T20I shirt no.: 19

Domestic team information
- Years: Team
- 2013/14–present: Baroda
- 2022: Velocity
- 2023–present: Mumbai Indians
- 2024/25: Melbourne Stars

Career statistics
Competition	WTest	WODI	WT20I
Matches	4	28	19
Runs scored	223	666	214
Batting average	31.86	24.66	16.46
100s/50s	1/1	0/4	0/0
Top score	113	64	36
Catches/stumpings	5/–	14/10	5/8
Medal record
Representing India
Women's Cricket
Commonwealth Games
Silver medal – second place	2022 Birmingham	Team
- Source: ESPNcricinfo, 17 August 2025

Yastika Bhatia (born 1 November 2000) is an Indian international cricketer Who plays for the Indian women's national cricket team in all formats of this game. She plays for the Gujrat giants in the WPL and Baroda in Domestic cricket.

== Career ==
In February 2021, Bhatia earned her maiden call-up to the India women's cricket team, for their limited overs matches against South Africa. Bhatia said that her selection to the national team was surreal, and thanked her coach and club for the opportunity. She had also played for the India Women's A team during their tour of Australia in December 2019.

In August 2021, Bhatia was again called up to the national team, for their series against Australia, including being named in India's squad for the one-off women's Test match. She made her Women's One Day International (WODI) debut on 21 September 2021 against Australia. She made her Test debut on 30 September 2021, for India against Australia. She made her Women's Twenty20 International (WT20I) debut on 7 October 2021, also against Australia.

In January 2022, she was named in India's team for the 2022 Women's Cricket World Cup in New Zealand. In July 2022, she was named in India's team for the cricket tournament at the 2022 Commonwealth Games in Birmingham, England.

She was named in the India squad for the 2024 ICC Women's T20 World Cup and their home ODI series against New Zealand in October 2024.

Bhatia unfortunately missed out on the 2025 Women's Cricket World Cup sustained an injury to her left knee during India's preparatory camp in Visakhapatnam, and was replaced by Uma Chetry.

On July 12, 2026, in a one-off Test match against England at Lord's Cricket Ground, Bhatia made a century in the second innings, reaching the milestone in 145 balls. This meant she became the first woman to make a century at Lord's.
