= Harleen Deol =

Indian cricketer

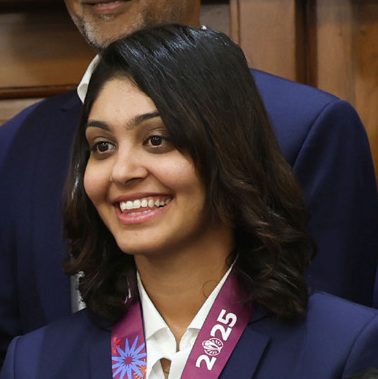
- Deol in 2025

Personal information
- Full name: Harleen Kaur Deol
- Born: 21 June 1998 (age 28); Chandigarh, India
- Batting: Right-handed
- Bowling: Right-arm leg break
- Role: Batter

International information
- National side: India (2019–present)
- ODI debut (cap 126): 22 February 2019 v England
- Last ODI: 26 October 2025 v Bangladesh
- ODI shirt no.: 33 (formerly 98)
- T20I debut (cap 62): 4 March 2019 v England
- Last T20I: 11 July 2023 v Bangladesh
- T20I shirt no.: 33 (formerly 98)

Domestic team information
- Years: Team
- 2013/14–present: Himachal Pradesh
- 2019–2020: Trailblazers
- 2022: Supernovas
- 2023–2025: Gujarat Giants
- 2026: UP Warriorz

Career statistics
Competition	WODI	WT20I
Matches	37	26
Runs scored	1050	298
Batting average	32.81	17.53
100s/50s	1/4	0/1
Top score	115	52
Balls bowled	90	108
Wickets	2	6
Bowling average	40.50	23.33
5 wickets in innings	0	0
10 wickets in match	0	0
Best bowling	1/7	2/13
Catches/stumpings	13/–	7/–
Medal record
Women's cricket
Representing India
ICC Cricket World Cup
Winner	2025 India
ICC T20 World Cup
Runner-up	2020 Australia
Commonwealth Games
Silver medal – second place	2022 Birmingham
- Source: ESPNcricinfo, 2 February 2026

Harleen Kaur Deol (born 21 June 1998) is an Indian international cricketer. She plays for the Indian women's national team as a right-handed batter who occasionally bowls right-arm leg spin. Deol represents Himachal Pradesh in domestic cricket and UP Warriorz in the Women's Premier League. She was part of the Indian team that won the 2025 Women's Cricket World Cup.

== Career ==
Harleen made her WODI debut for India against England on 22 February 2019, at Wankhede in Mumbai, becoming the second woman cricketer from Chandigarh to play for India after Taniya Bhatia. She completed her schooling from Yadavindra Public School, Mohali and subsequently made her WT20I debut against England on 4 March 2019. Harleen made her Women's T20 Challenge debut for Trailblazers on 6 May 2019 against Supernovas, sharing a 100-run partnership with Smriti Mandhana.

In January 2020, she was named in India's squad for the 2020 ICC Women's T20 World Cup in Australia.

Deol went viral in July 2021 after performing an acrobatic catch while avoiding the boundary rope during the Twenty20 series against England. Fielding at long-off, Deol leapt to catch a lofted Amy Jones drive two-handed high above her head but, realising her momentum was taking her across the boundary rope to potentially concede six runs, she lobbed the ball into the air to give herself enough time to dive back onto the field of play to recapture the falling ball mid-air. She earned praise from Sachin Tendulkar and Prime Minister Narendra Modi for the catch.

In July 2022, she was named in India's team for the cricket tournament at the 2022 Commonwealth Games in Birmingham, England.

In the inaugural season of the Indian Women's Premier League in 2023, Harleen Deol was acquired by Gujarat Giants (GG) for INR 40 Lakhs. At the four-week tournament's conclusion, she was one of thirteen batters to have amassed over 200 runs. Her 202 aggregate, which she achieved at a Strike rate of 125.46, brought her within two runs of top scoring for her team.

On 24 December 2024, Harleen scored her maiden WODI and International century (115 off 103) for India during the 2nd WODI against West Indies.

Harleen Deol was in the spotlight in WPL 2026 when she was controversially retired out on 47 during match against Delhi Capitals. 24 hours later, she smashed a match-winning 64* against Mumbai Indians to silence her critics in style.
