= West Zone women's cricket team =

Indian cricket team

West Zone
Personnel
- Captain: Yastika Bhatia

Team information
- Established: 1974

History
- First-class debut: South Zone in 2015 at Jadavpur University Second Campus Ground, Kolkata
- IZODC wins: 0
- IZ3D wins: 0
- IZT20 wins: 0
- IZOD wins: 0

The West Zone women's cricket team is a women's cricket team that represents Western India in the Women's Senior Inter Zonal One Day and Women's Senior Inter Zonal T20. It is a composite team of players from five teams from western India: Baroda, Gujarat, Maharashtra, Mumbai and Saurashtra. They were formed in 1974–75 to play in the Rani Jhansi Trophy, which they competed in until 2002–03, when the competition ended. They then competed in the Inter Zone Women's One Day Competition, and then in the Inter Zone Women's Three Day Competition, where they finished as runners-up in 2016–17.

== History ==
West Zone Women first played in the Rani Jhansi Trophy in the 1974–75 season, a List A competition. They competed in the tournament until it was dissolved after the 2002–03 season, but full results for the trophy are not recorded.

In 2007, West Zone began playing in the Inter Zone Women's One Day Competition, which they competed in between the 2006–07 season until it ended after the 2013–14 season. They finished as runners-up three times in the tournament, in 2007–08, 2008–09 and 2010–11.

In the 2014–15 season, the zonal teams began competing in a two-day competition, the Inter Zone Women's Two Day Competition. In the first season, West Zone finished bottom of the table with 4 points. The following season, 2015–16, the tournament became a three-day competition, with West Zone finishing 4th out of the 5 teams competing. In 2016–17 they achieved their best finish, coming second with one victory and one drawn game won on first innings. Their one win was the largest win in the tournament, by an innings and 109 runs over South Zone. In 2017–18, the side finished third, winning one match, again over South Zone.

In 2022–23, zonal cricket in India returned, in the form of the Women's Senior Inter Zonal T20. They finished second out of sixth teams in the group stage of the first edition of the tournament, before losing in the final to Central Zone by 9 wickets. In February 2023, the 2022–23 Women's Senior Inter Zonal One Day tournament took place, in which they finished fifth in the group stage.

== Players ==
=== Current squad ===
Based on squad announced for the 2023–24 season. Players in bold have international caps.

| Name | Nationality | Domestic team | Notes | | | | |
|---|---|---|---|---|---|---|---|
| Name | Nationality | Domestic team | Notes | **Yastika Bhatia** | India | Baroda | Captain; wicket-keeper |
| Vrushali Bhagat | India | Mumbai | | | | | |
| Neha Chavda | India | Saurashtra | | | | | |
| Humaira Kazi | India | Mumbai | | | | | |
| Aarti Kedar | India | Maharashtra | | | | | |
| Simran Patel | India | Gujarat | | | | | |
| Tarannum Pathan | India | Baroda | | | | | |
| Shraddha Pokharkar | India | Maharashtra | | | | | |
| Pragya Rawat | India | Baroda | | | | | |
| Sayali Satghara | India | Mumbai | | | | | |
| Simran Shaikh | India | Mumbai | | | | | |
| Shivali Shinde | India | Maharashtra | | | | | |
| Maya Sonawane | India | Maharashtra | | | | | |
| Devika Vaidya | India | Maharashtra | | | | | |
| Muskan Vasava | India | Gujarat | | | | | |

== Seasons ==
=== Inter Zone Women's Three Day Competition ===
| Season | League standings | | | | | | | | | Notes |
| Season | P | W | L | DWF | DLF | ND | BP | Pts | Pos | Notes |
|---|---|---|---|---|---|---|---|---|---|---|
| 2014–15 | 4 | 0 | 0 | 0 | 1 | 3 | 0 | 4 | 5th | |
| 2015–16 | 4 | 0 | 0 | 2 | 2 | 0 | 0 | 8 | 4th | |
| 2016–17 | 4 | 1 | 0 | 1 | 2 | 0 | 1 | 12 | 2nd | |
| 2017–18 | 4 | 1 | 2 | 1 | 0 | 0 | 1 | 10 | 3rd | |

=== Women's Senior Inter Zonal T20 ===
| Season | League standings | | | | | | | | Notes |
| Season | P | W | L | T | NR | NRR | Pts | Pos | Notes |
|---|---|---|---|---|---|---|---|---|---|
| 2022–23 | 5 | 4 | 1 | 0 | 0 | +0.370 | 16 | 2nd | Lost in final |
| 2023–24 | 5 | 3 | 1 | 0 | 1 | +1.237 | 14 | 2nd | Lost in final |

=== Women's Senior Inter Zonal One Day ===
| Season | League standings | | | | | | | | Notes |
| Season | P | W | L | T | NR | NRR | Pts | Pos | Notes |
|---|---|---|---|---|---|---|---|---|---|
| 2022–23 | 5 | 1 | 4 | 0 | 0 | –0.249 | 4 | 5th | |

== Honours ==
- Inter Zone Women's One Day Competition:
  - Winners (0):
  - Best finish: Runners-up (2007–08, 2008–09 & 2010–11)
- Senior Women's Cricket Inter Zonal Three Day Game:
  - Winners (0):
  - Best finish: Runners-up (2016–17)
- Women's Senior Inter Zonal T20:
  - Winners (0):
  - Best finish: Runners-up (2022–23)
- Women's Senior Inter Zonal One Day:
  - Winners (0):
  - Best finish: 5th (2022–23)
