= Amanjot Kaur =

Indian cricketer (born 2000)

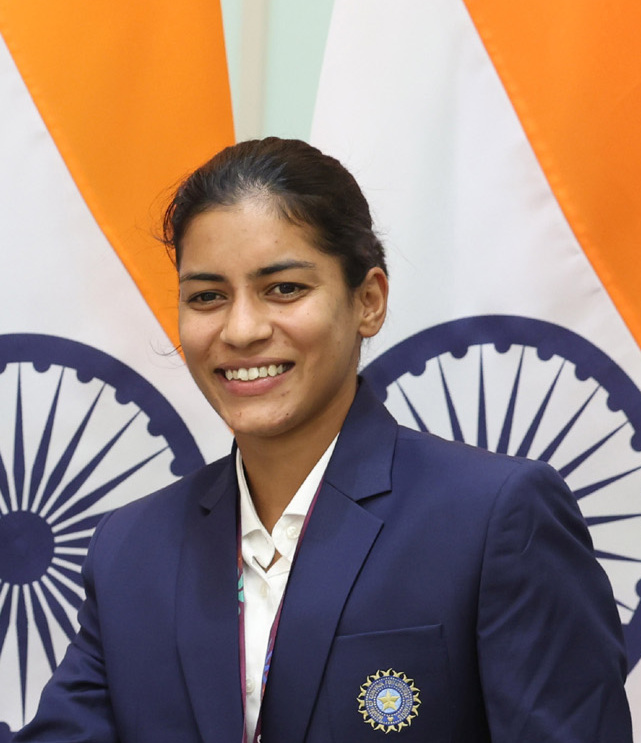
- Kaur in 2025

Personal information
- Born: 25 August 2000 (age 26); Mohali, Punjab, India
- Batting: Right-handed
- Bowling: Right-arm medium
- Role: All-rounder

International information
- National side: India
- ODI debut (cap 139): 16 July 2023 v Bangladesh
- Last ODI: 2 November 2025 v South Africa
- ODI shirt no.: 30
- T20I debut (cap 73): 19 January 2023 v South Africa
- Last T20I: 30 December 2025 v Sri Lanka
- T20I shirt no.: 30

Domestic team information
- Years: Team
- 2017/18–2018/19, 2022/23–present: Punjab
- 2019/20–2021/22: Chandigarh
- 2023–present: Mumbai Indians

Career statistics
Competition	WODI	WT20I
Matches	16	21
Runs scored	244	185
Batting average	22.18	30.83
100s/50s	0/1	0/1
Top score	57	63*
Balls bowled	629	234
Wickets	19	8
Bowling average	33.73	36.00
5 wickets in innings	0	0
10 wickets in match	0	0
Best bowling	4/31	2/25
Catches/stumpings	4/–	7/–
Medal record
Women's cricket
Representing India
ICC Cricket World Cup
Winner	2025 India
Asian Games
Gold medal – first place	2022 Hangzhou
- Source: ESPNcricinfo, 10 January 2026

Amanjot Kaur (born 25 August 2000) is an Indian cricketer who currently plays for Punjab. She plays as a right-arm medium bowler and right-handed batter.

== International career ==
She made her debut for India in January 2023, scoring 41* in a Player of the Match performance against South Africa.

She made her ODI debut against Bangladesh, on 16 July 2023 and took 4 wickets.

In July 2023, she was selected in India's 2023 Asian Games squad.

In 2025, she was selected in the squad for the 2025 Women's Cricket World Cup. She played a crucial role in the opening match and took an important catch in the final, eventually winning their maiden World Cup title.
