= Ekta Bisht =

Indian cricketer

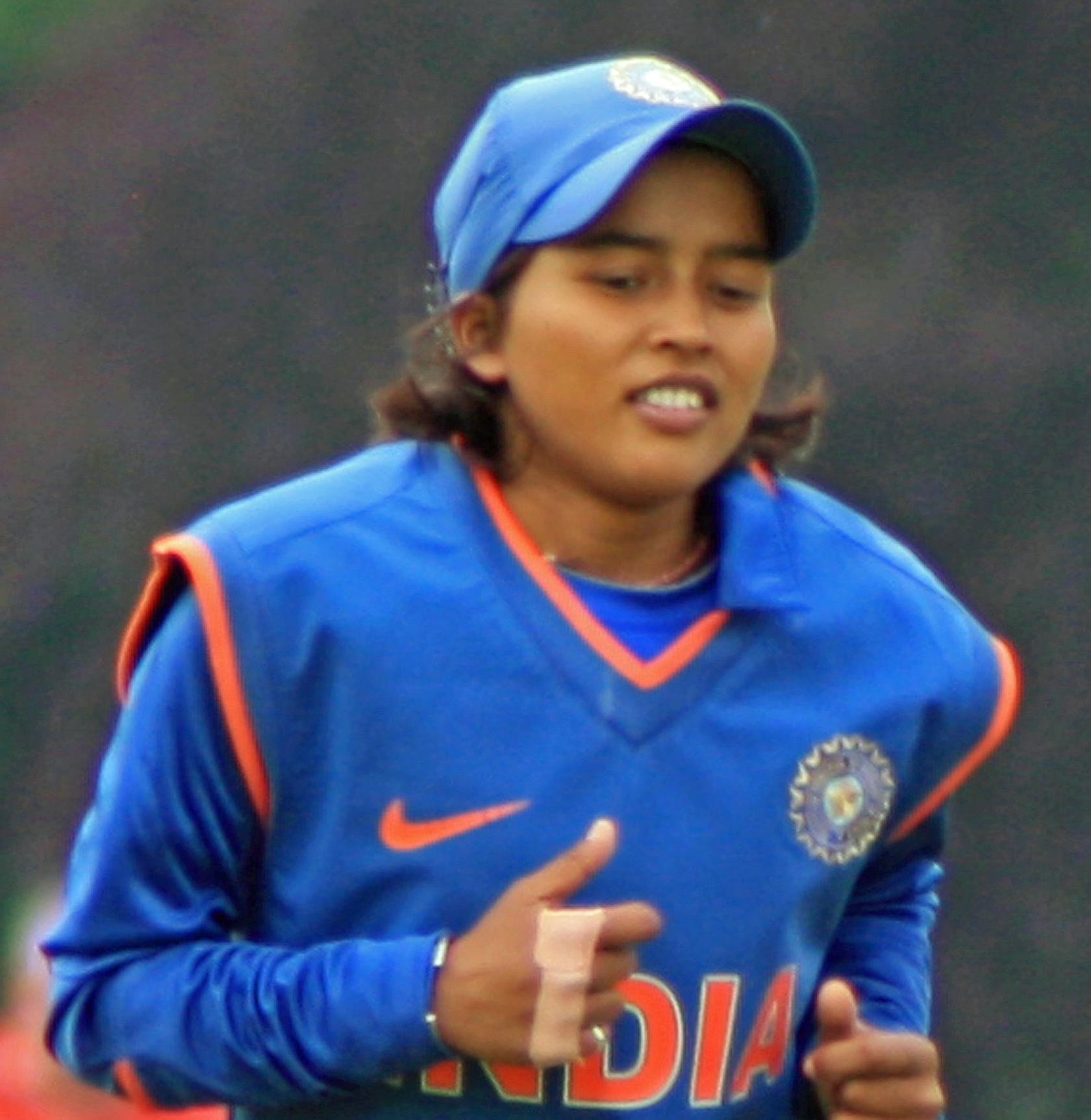
- Ekta Bisht in 2012

Personal information
- Full name: Ekta Bisht
- Born: 8 February 1986 (age 40); Almora, Uttarakhand, India
- Batting: Left-handed
- Bowling: Slow left-arm orthodox

International information
- National side: India (2011–2022)
- Only Test (cap 73): 13 August 2014 v England
- ODI debut (cap 97): 2 July 2011 v Australia
- Last ODI: 18 February 2022 v New Zealand
- T20I debut (cap 24): 23 June 2011 v Australia
- Last T20I: 9 March 2019 v England

Domestic team information
- Years: Team
- 2006/07–2012/13: Uttar Pradesh
- 2013/14–2021/22: Railways
- 2018: Trailblazers
- 2019–2020: Velocity
- 2022/23–present: Uttarakhand
- 2024: Royal Challengers Bangalore

Career statistics
| Competition | WTest | WODI | WT20I |
|---|---|---|---|
| Matches | 1 | 63 | 42 |
| Runs scored | 0 | 172 | 40 |
| Batting average | – | 8.19 | 5.00 |
| 100s/50s | 0/0 | 0/0 | 0/0 |
| Top score | 0* | 18* | 15 |
| Balls bowled | 228 | 3,399 | 883 |
| Wickets | 3 | 98 | 53 |
| Bowling average | 14.66 | 21.83 | 14.71 |
| 5 wickets in innings | 0 | 2 | 0 |
| 10 wickets in match | 0 | 0 | 0 |
| Best bowling | 2/33 | 5/8 | 4/21 |
| Catches/stumpings | 0/– | 16/– | 6/– |
- Source: ESPNcricinfo, 6 November 2022

Ekta Bisht is an Indian cricketer. She plays as a slow left-arm orthodox bowler. She was India's first international woman cricketer from Uttarakhand. She was also the first cricketer for India to take a hat-trick in a Women's Twenty20 International match.

== Early life ==
Ekta Bisht was born on 8 February 1986 in Almora, Uttar Pradesh (now in Uttarakhand) to Kundan Singh Bisht and Tara Bisht. Her father is a retired Havaldar of the Indian Army. Ekta Bisht has three elder siblings, Kaushal Bisht, Vineet Bisht and Shweta Bisht. Bisht began playing cricket at the age of six. She would play the sport with boys, which often drew an audience as she was the only girl on a male team. Receiving only a pension of ₹1,500 (equivalent to ₹22,000 or US$240 in 2026) for his former army job, Bisht's father opened a tea stall in Almora to supplement the family's income and support his daughter's cricketing career. She was the captain of Kumaon University in North zone. The family's finances improved after Ekta was selected for the national team in 2011, and began receiving funding from sponsors. Following an increase in her father's Army pension, the family was able to close the tea stall.

== Career ==
Bisht played for Uttar Pradesh between 2006–07 and 2012–13. She was the captain of Kumaon University in North zone. She had been mentored by Liyakat Ali in her early years, who coached Uttaranchal Women's Cricket Association team from 2003 to 2006.

Bisht was selected for the India women's national cricket team in 2011, and made her WODI debut on 2 July 2011 against Australia.

On 3 October 2012, Bisht took a hat-trick as India outplayed during the match of the ICC World Women Twenty20 played in Colombo, Sri Lanka. India has restricted Sri Lanka to a modest 100 for eight after Bisht claimed a hat-trick in the last over. Bisht was part of the Indian team to reach the final of the 2017 Women's Cricket World Cup where the team lost to England by nine runs.

In December 2017, she was named as one of the players in both the ICC Women's ODI Team of the Year and the ICC Women's T20I Team of the Year. She was the only woman named in both squads.

In October 2018, she was named in India's squad for the 2018 ICC Women's World Twenty20 tournament in the West Indies.

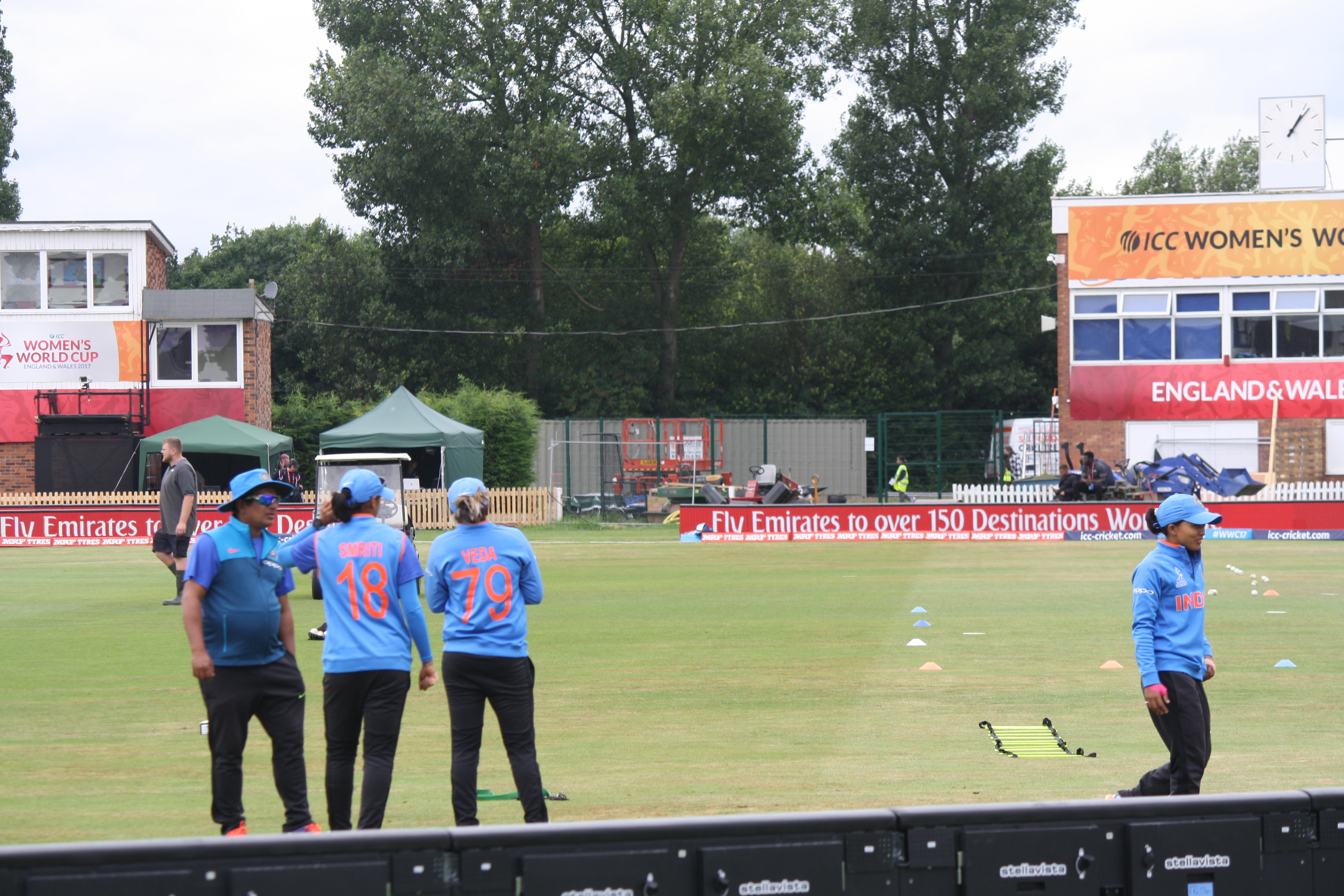
2017 Women's Cricket World Cup IMG 2642 (35334431633)

During the 2017 Women's Cricket World Cup, Bisht claimed 5 wickets in 18 runs against Pakistan, leading India to win by 95 runs. With this, she broke her own record of 5 wickets in 8 runs against Colombo in February, the same year. It is said that 12 years back (2005)m in the same setup, she was injured and had to leave the match midway. But in 2017 she redeemed herself with her historical win.

As of November 2018, she has had 79 ODI wickets and 50 T20I wickets averaging 21.98 and 14.50 respectively.

Bisht was also Joint second highest wicket taker in ODI's in 2017 at an average of 17.27 with 29 wickets in 16 matches.

She is the fifth Indian woman to cross the 100 wicket mark with 129 international wickets and India's fifth highest wicket taker in ODI's and third highest in T20I's. She is also praised by Sachin Tendulkar for her fielding skills, who also happens to be her favorite cricketer.

In May 2021, she was named in India's Test squad for their one-off match against the England women's cricket team. In January 2022, she was named as one of three reserve players in India's team for the 2022 Women's Cricket World Cup in New Zealand.

In December 2023, she was signed by Royal Challengers Bangalore at the Women's Premier League auction, for the 2024 season.

== Awards ==
In November 2017, the Uttarakhand government decided to confer the year's Khel Ratna award to bowler Ekta Bisht and Dronacharya Award to her coach Liyakat Ali Khan.
