= Taniya Bhatia =

Indian cricketer (born 1997)

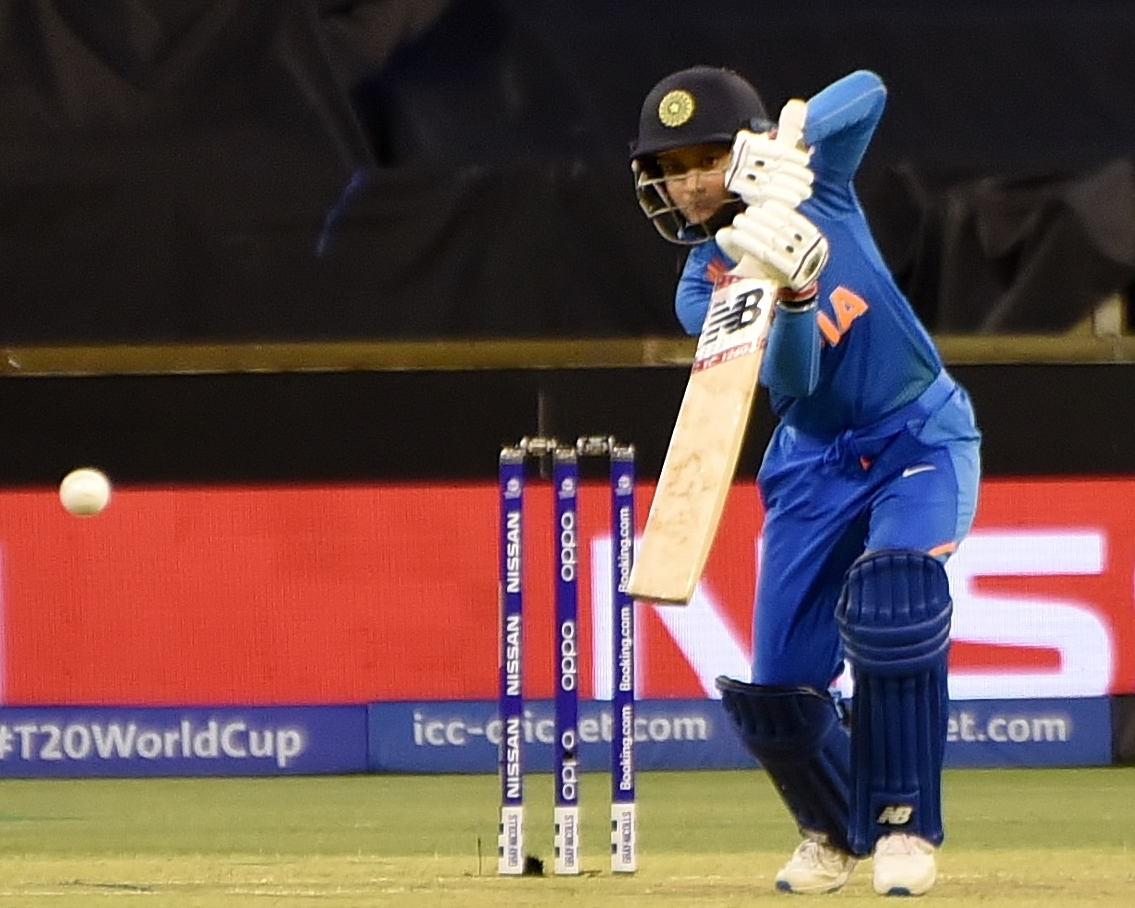
- Bhatia batting for India during the 2020 ICC Women's T20 World Cup

Personal information
- Full name: Taniya Bhatia
- Born: 28 November 1997 (age 28); Chandigarh, India
- Batting: Right-handed
- Role: Wicket-keeper

International information
- National side: India
- Test debut (cap 84): 16 June 2021 v England
- Last Test: 30 September 2021 v Australia
- ODI debut (cap 124): 11 September 2018 v Sri Lanka
- Last ODI: 18 February 2022 v New Zealand
- T20I debut (cap 55): 13 February 2018 v South Africa
- Last T20I: 7 August 2022 v Australia

Domestic team information
- Years: Team
- 2011/12–present: Punjab
- 2018–2022: Supernovas
- 2023–present: Delhi Capitals

Career statistics
Competition	WTest	WODI	WT20I
Matches	2	19	53
Runs scored	66	138	172
Batting average	33.00	15.33	9.05
100s/50s	0/0	0/1	0/0
Top score	44*	68	46
Catches/stumpings	4/0	18/9	23/45
Medal record
Representing India
Women's Cricket
T20 World Cup
Runner-up	2020 Australia
Women's Asia Cup
Runner-up	2018 Malaysia
Commonwealth Games
Silver medal – second place	2022 Birmingham	Team
- Source: ESPNcricinfo, 15 August 2022

Taniya Bhatia (born 28 November 1997) is an Indian cricketer. She plays for Punjab and India, primarily as a wicket-keeper. She is currently trained under coach RP Singh. The International Cricket Council (ICC) named Bhatia as one of the five breakout stars in women's cricket in 2018.

== Early life ==
She was born to Sapna and Sanjay Bhatia in Chandigarh. Her father works in Central Bank of India and had played cricket at the all India university level. She has an elder sister Sanjana and younger brother Sehaj.

Earlier, Bhatia trained under former Indian cricketer Yograj Singh, Yuvraj Singh's father, while she was studying at DAV Senior Secondary School. She is currently studying BA-II at MCM DAV College for Women. Bhatia's father was himself a cricket player and so was her uncle. Her brother too has joined the U-19 cricket team.

== Early career ==
After her DAV academy days, she became the youngest girl to represent Punjab in U19 at the young age of 11. She soon joined the senior state team at the age of 16.

At the age of 13, Bhatia became the youngest player to play for the senior Punjab team in the inter-state domestic tournament in 2011. In 2015, she captained the U-19 North Zone side in the inter-zonal cricket tournament in Guwahati. In the game she also scored 227 runs and was responsible for 10 dismissals. She joined India A squad, when she turned 16. She went on a professional slump for two years which almost made her lose her interest in cricket altogether. She overcame it with the support of her mother which motivated her to pursue her dreams.

== International career ==
She made her Women's Twenty20 International cricket (WT20I) debut for India Women against South Africa Women on 13 February 2018. Bhatia is the first woman cricketer from Chandigarh to be a part of the national team. Bhatia wears jersey No 28 in the team. She made her Women's One Day International (WODI) debut against Sri Lanka on 11 September 2018.

In October 2018, she was named in India's squad for the 2018 ICC Women's World Twenty20 tournament in the West Indies. In January 2020, she was named in India's squad for the 2020 ICC Women's T20 World Cup in Australia.

In May 2021, she was named in India's Test squad for their one-off match against the England women's cricket team. Bhatia made her Test debut on 16 June 2021, for India against England. In January 2022, she was named in India's team for the 2022 Women's Cricket World Cup in New Zealand. In July 2022, she was named in India's team for the cricket tournament at the 2022 Commonwealth Games in Birmingham, England.
