= East Zone women's cricket team =

East Zone
Personnel
- Captain: Madhuri Mehta

Team information
- Established: 1974

History
- First-class debut: New Zealand in 1985 at Nehru Stadium, Durgapur
- IZODC wins: 0
- IZ3D wins: 1
- IZT20 wins: 1
- IZOD wins: 0

The East Zone women's cricket team is a women's cricket team that represents East India in the Women's Senior Inter Zonal One Day and Women's Senior Inter Zonal T20. It is a composite team of players from five teams from eastern India: Assam, Bengal, Jharkhand, Odisha and Tripura. They were formed in 1974–75 to play in the Rani Jhansi Trophy, which they competed in until 2002–03, when the competition ended. They then competed in the Inter Zone Women's One Day Competition, and then in the Inter Zone Women's Three Day Competition, which they finished as champions once and runners-up twice.

== History ==
East Zone Women first played in the Rani Jhansi Trophy in the 1974–75 season, a List A competition. They competed in the tournament until it was dissolved after the 2002–03 season, but full results for the trophy are not recorded. They also played matches against the touring New Zealand side in 1975–76 and 1984–85.

In 2007, East Zone began playing in the Inter Zone Women's One Day Competition, which they competed in between the 2006–07 season until it ended after the 2013–14 season. Their best finish in the tournament came in 2010–11, finishing 3rd with two wins from their four matches.

In the 2014–15 season, the zonal teams began competing in a two-day competition, the Inter Zone Women's Two Day Competition. In the first season, East Zone finished as runners-up, with two drawn games won on first innings from their four matches. The side again finished as runners-up in 2015–16, when the tournament became a three-day competition, with three drawn games won on first innings. In 2016–17 the side finished fourth and in 2017–18 East Zone finished bottom of the five team league.

In 2022–23, zonal cricket in India returned, in the form of the Women's Senior Inter Zonal T20. They finished fifth out of sixth teams in the first edition of the tournament. In February 2023, the 2022–23 Women's Senior Inter Zonal One Day tournament took place, in which they finished third in the group stage. They won their first title in December 2023, winning the Women's Senior Inter Zonal T20.

East Zone were crowned as the champions of the 2023–24 Senior Women's Inter Zonal Multi-Day Trophy after beating South Zone by one wicket in the final.

== Players ==
=== Current squad ===
Based on squad announced for the 2023–24 season. Players in bold have international caps.

Name	Nationality	Domestic team	Notes				
Name	Nationality	Domestic team	Notes	**Madhuri Mehta**	India	Odisha	Captain
Priyanka Acharjee	India	Tripura					
Uma Chetry	India	Assam					
Sushree Dibyadarshini	India	Odisha					
Dhara Gujjar	India	Bengal					
**Richa Ghosh**	India	Bengal					
**Saika Ishaque**	India	Bengal					
Jintimani Kalita	India	Assam					
Ashwani Kumari	India	Jharkhand					
Mamta Paswan	India	Jharkhand					
Mita Paul	India	Bengal					
Indrani Roy	India	Jharkhand					
**Titas Sadhu**	India	Bengal					
Priyanka Sarkar	India	Bengal					
**Deepti Sharma**	India	Bengal					

== Seasons ==
=== Inter Zone Women's Three Day Competition ===
Season	League standings									Notes
Season	P	W	L	DWF	DLF	ND	BP	Pts	Pos	Notes
2014–15	4	0	0	2	1	1	0	8	2nd	
2015–16	4	0	0	3	1	0	0	10	2nd	
2016–17	4	0	1	2	1	0	0	7	4th	
2017–18	4	0	1	1	2	0	0	5	5th	
2023–24	3	3	0	0	0	0	0	N/A	1st	

=== Women's Senior Inter Zonal T20 ===
Season	League standings								Notes
Season	P	W	L	T	NR	NRR	Pts	Pos	Notes
2022–23	5	1	4	0	0	+0.257	4	5th	
2023–24	5	4	0	0	1	+2.074	18	1st	Champions

=== Women's Senior Inter Zonal One Day ===
Season	League standings								Notes
Season	P	W	L	T	NR	NRR	Pts	Pos	Notes
2022–23	5	3	2	0	0	+0.362	12	3rd	

== Honours ==
- Inter Zone Women's One Day Competition:
  - Winners (0):
  - Best finish: 3rd (2010–11)
- Senior Women's Cricket Inter Zonal Three Day Game:
  - **Winners (1): 2023–24**
- Women's Senior Inter Zonal T20:
  - Winners (1): 2023–24
- Women's Senior Inter Zonal One Day:
  - Winners (0):
  - Best finish: 3rd (2022–23)
