= Cricket in India =

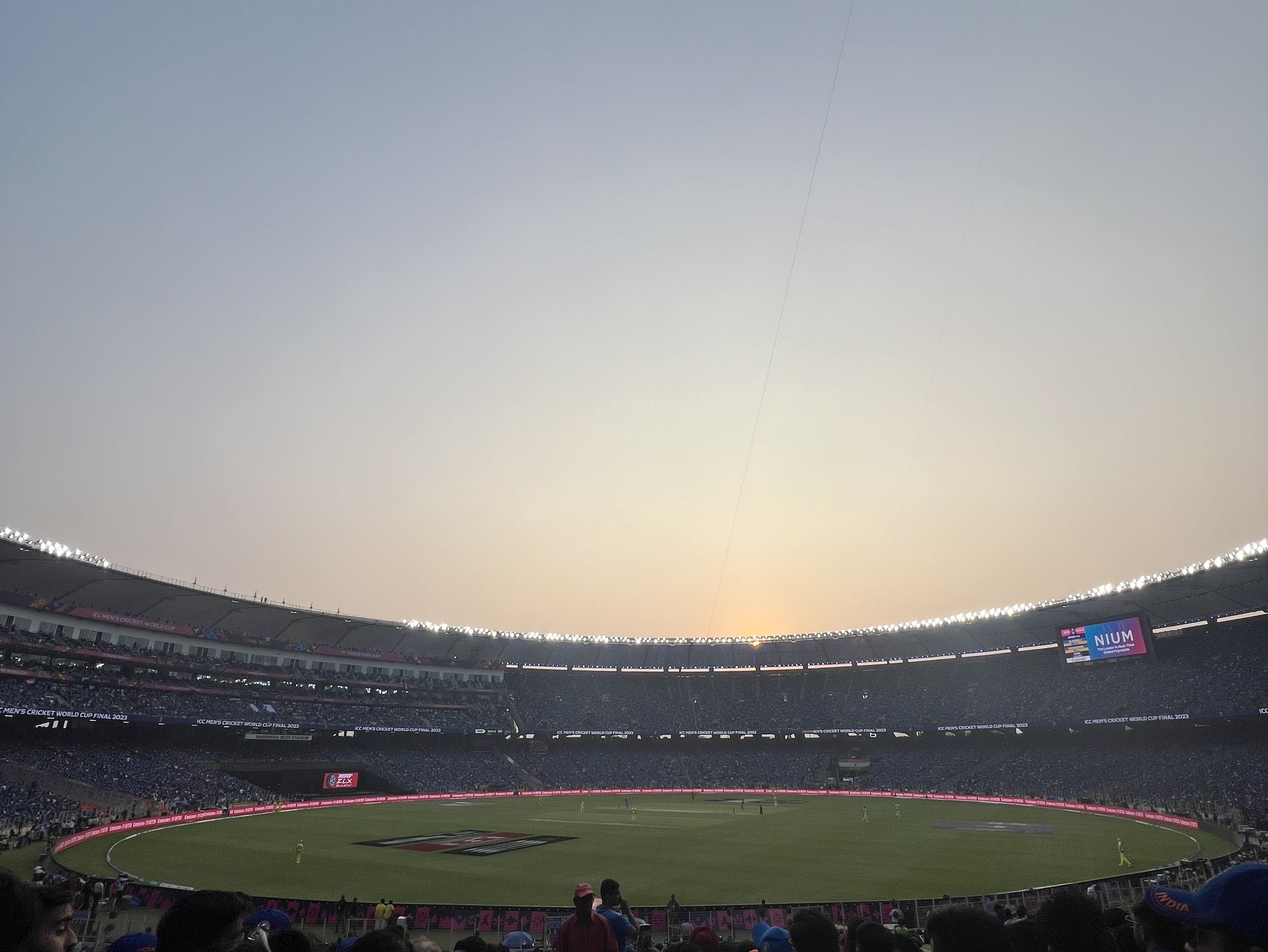
- Narendra Modi Stadium in Ahmedabad, Gujarat
- Country: India
- Governing body: Board of Control for Cricket in India
- National teams: India Men; India Women; India U-19 Men; India U-19 Women; India A Men; India B Men
- First played: 1721
- Clubs: 10 (IPL); 5 (WPL)

National competitions
- List: Senior Cricket Competition: First Class Cricket; Ranji Trophy; Duleep Trophy; Irani Trophy; Senior Women's Inter Zonal Multi-Day Trophy; List A Cricket; Vijay Hazare Trophy; Deodhar Trophy; Senior Women's One Day Trophy; Senior Women's One Day Inter Zonal Trophy; T20 Cricket; Syed Mushtaq Ali Trophy; Senior Women's T20 Trophy; Senior Women's T20 Inter Zonal Trophy; U-23 Cricket Competition: First Class Cricket; CK Nayudu Trophy (4 day format); List A Cricket; Mens under-23 State A Trophy; Women's under-23 One Day Trophy; T20 Cricket; Women's under-23 T20 Trophy; U-19 Cricket Competition: First Class Cricket; Cooch Behar Trophy (4 day format); List A Cricket; Vinoo Mankad Trophy; Women's under-19 One Day Trophy; T20 Cricket; Women's under-19 T20 Trophy; U-16 Cricket Competition: First Class Cricket; Vijay Merchant Trophy; List A Cricket; Women's under-15 One Day Trophy; University Cricket Competition: Vizzy Trophy (One Day format)

Club competitions
- List: Indian Premier League (M); Women's Premier League (W)

International competitions
- List: Men’s national team; World Test Championship: Runners-up (2019-2021, 2021-2023); Cricket World Cup: Champions (1983, 2011); T20 World Cup: Champions (2007, 2024, 2026); Champions Trophy: Champions (2002, 2013, 2025); Asia Cup: Champions (1984, 1988, 1990-1991, 1955, 2010, 2016, 2018, 2023, 2025); Commonwealth Games: Group Stage (1998); Asian Games: Gold Medal (2022); Men’s U-19 national team; U19 Cricket World Cup: Champions (2000, 2008, 2012, 2018, 2022, 2026); U19 Asia Cup: Champions (1989, 2003, 2012, 2013-14, 2016, 2018, 2019, 2021, 2026 ); India A cricket team; Asia Cup Rising Stars: Champions (2013); Women's national team; Women's Cricket World Cup: Champions (2025); Women's T20 World Cup: Runners-up (2020); Women's Asia Cup: Champions (2004, 2005-2006, 2006, 2008, 2012, 2016, 2022, 2026); Commonwealth Games: Silver Medal (2022); Asian Games: Gold Medal (2022, 2026); Women's U-19 national team; U19 Women's T20 World Cup: Champions (2023, 2025); U19 Women's T20 Asia Cup: Champions (2024); India A women's cricket team; Women's Asia Cup Rising Stars: Champions (2023, 2026)

Audience records
- Single match: 465,000 (Five-day Test); India v. Pakistan at Eden Gardens, Kolkata, 16–20 February 1999
- Season: 1,592,543 (Total); 26,528 per match 2017 IPL

Cricket is the most popular sport in India. It is played almost everywhere in the country. The Board of Control for Cricket in India (BCCI) is the governing body of cricket in India. It conducts all the domestic tournaments in India and select the players for the India national cricket team and the India women's national cricket team to represent India at international cricket.

International cricket in India does not follow a consistent pattern and is spread throughout the calendar year, unlike the Australian and English cricket teams who tour other countries during their respective winter and play at home during their respective summer. The India cricket team is one of the most successful cricket teams in the world, having won 2 Cricket World Cups, 3 T20 World Cups, 3 Champions Trophies and finishing runners-up twice in World Test Championships. The India women's national cricket team has also won a Women's Cricket World Cup. India has hosted multiple Cricket World Cups, (Note: It hosted the 1987, 1996, 2011 and 2023 Cricket World Cups, the 2006 Champions Trophy and the 2016 T20 World Cup. It also hosted 2013 Women's Cricket World Cup.) and will host the 2026 Men's T20 World Cup, (Note: the 2026 Men's T20 World Cup is scheduled to take place in India, but Sri Lanka will also serve as a co-host.) the 2029 Champions Trophy, and the 2031 Cricket World Cup in future. (Note: the 2031 Cricket World Cup is scheduled to take place in India, but Bangladesh will also serve as a co-host.)

Cricket is an important part of Indian culture and top players, like Sunil Gavaskar, Mohinder Amarnath, Kapil Dev, Polly Umrigar, Bishan Singh Bedi, Lala Amarnath, Ravi Shastri, Sachin Tendulkar, Sourav Ganguly, Rahul Dravid, VVS Laxman, Yuvraj Singh, Gautam Gambhir, Virender Sehwag, MS Dhoni, Virat Kohli, Rohit Sharma, KL Rahul, Ravichandran Ashwin, Ravindra Jadeja, Hardik Pandya, Jasprit Bumrah, Shubman Gill and Sanju Samson often attain celebrity status and are some of the most influential figures in the country. Cricket is often portrayed patriotically in popular Indian films, including the Academy Award-nominated film, Lagaan, and 83, the 2021 sports drama film about India's Cricket World Cup victory in 1983. The Indian cricket team shares a long-standing rivalry with the Pakistan cricket team, and India-Pakistan matches are some of the most anticipated matches in the world, and one of the most watched television broadcasts in the world. The India–Australia cricket rivalry is a highly intense and competitive rivalry within the sport of cricket. The matches between these countries are known for their intensity. These matches are considered among the most-viewed sporting events globally.

== History ==
Cricket was brought to India in the early 1700s, with the first documented instance of cricket being played in 1721. At the time of its introduction, it served as a medium for Indians to integrate into British cultural norms. By serving as a bridge between the two groups, it facilitated assimilation. During its early years in India, the sport was played by Indian elites to gain favour with the British. This association with the elite increased the sport's value and popularity across the country. Although it began as a foreign sport, the sport ultimately became associated with India and began to play a role in India's identity. In the late 1800s, cricket's image began to shift from being an exclusively upper-class sport as players from lower castes and underprivileged communities began to play and make their mark.

=== 1800s to 1918 ===
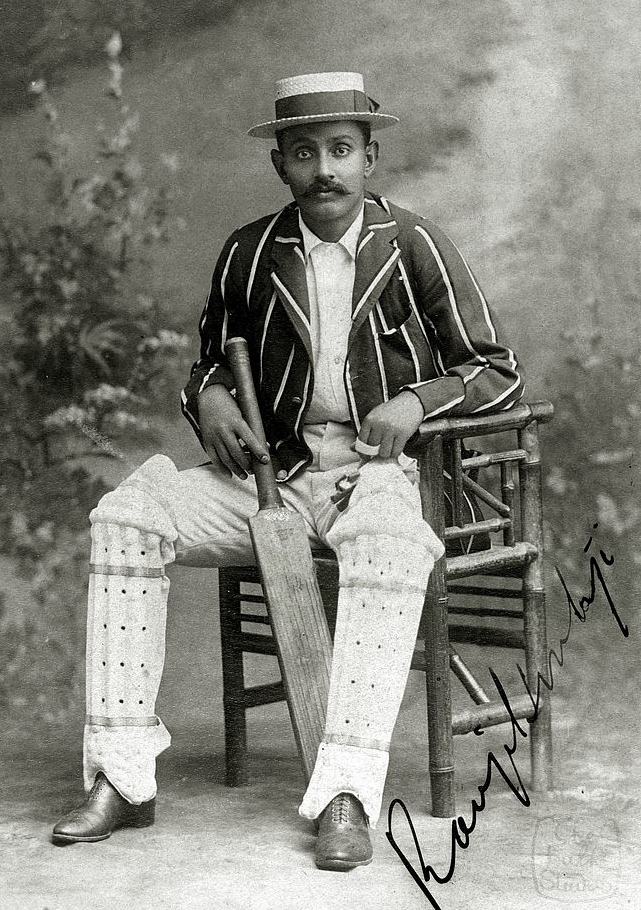
Ranjitsinhji was regarded as one of the best batsmen of his time.

The first ever match of first-class cricket played in India was in 1864 between Calcutta and Madras (now Chennai). Not many records exist from the match. The entire history of cricket in India and the sub-continent as a whole is based on the existence and development of the British Raj via the East India Company.

=== 1918 to 1945 ===
India became the sixth national team to play Test cricket on their 1932 tour of England. Captained by C. K. Nayudu, their inaugural Test was against England at Lord's Cricket Ground from 25 to 28 June, but they were defeated by 158 runs.

=== 1945 to 1960 ===
The major and defining event in the history of Indian cricket during this period was the Partition of India following full independence from the British Raj in 1947.

An early casualty of change was the Bombay Quadrangular tournament, which had been a focal point of Indian cricket for over 50 years. The new India had no place for teams based on ethnic origin. As a result, the Ranji Trophy came into its own as the national championship. The last Bombay Pentangular, as it had become, was won by the Hindus in 1945–46.

India also recorded its first Test victory in 1952, beating England by an innings in Madras.

=== 1960 to 1970 ===
One team totally dominated Indian cricket in the 1960s. As part of 14 consecutive victories in the Ranji Trophy from 1958–59 to 1972–73, Bombay won the title in all ten seasons of the period under review. Among its players were Farokh Engineer, Dilip Sardesai, Bapu Nadkarni, Ramakant Desai, Baloo Gupte, Ashok Mankad and Ajit Wadekar. The Duleep Trophy was inaugurated as a zonal competition in the 1961–1962 season. It was named after Ranji's nephew, Kumar Shri Duleepsinhji (1905–59). With Bombay in its catchment, it is not surprising that the West Zone won six of the first nine titles.

=== 1970 to 1985 ===
Bombay ( now Mumbai) continued to dominate Indian domestic cricket, with only Karnataka, Delhi, and a few other teams able to mount any kind of challenge during this period.

India enjoyed two international highlights. In 1971, they won a Test series in England for the first time ever, surprisingly defeating Ray Illingworth's Ashes winners. In 1983, India were surprise winners of the 1983 Cricket World Cup, in England, under the captaincy of Kapil Dev. Kapil Dev was also most known for the "Viv Richards Catch", scoring 175 not out, ( the first ODI century by an Indian), and breaking the World Record of Glenn Turner's 171. 183 is the lowest score ever defended in a world cup final.

During the 1970s, the Indian cricket team began to see success overseas beating New Zealand, and holding Australia, South Africa and England to a draw. The backbone of the team was the Indian spin quartet – Bishen Bedi, E. A. S. Prasanna, B. S. Chandrasekhar and Srinivas Venkataraghavan, giving rise to what would later be called the Golden Era of Indian cricket history. This decade also saw the emergence of two of India's best ever batsmen, Sunil Gavaskar and Gundappa Vishwanath responsible for the back-to-back series wins in 1971 in the West Indies and in England, under the captaincy of Ajit Wadekar.

The Indian women's team made its test debut in 1976, becoming the third nation to do so. It made its ODI debut on 1 January 1978.

=== 1985 to 2000 ===
In the late 1980s, British networks broadcast continuous live coverage of overseas matches. This was a major factor in shaping what was now becoming the modern game of cricket. Modern technology and the establishment of specialized television networks fostered global interest for the sport. ESPN and Star Sports added cricket to their 24-hour of continuous live coverage. Global popularity increased in the Eastern world. The Indian Premier League, a domestic league was established soon after.

During the 1980s, India developed a more attack-focused batting line-up with talented batsmen such as Mohammad Azharuddin, Dilip Vengsarkar and Ravi Shastri prominent during this decade. Despite India's victory in the Cricket World Cup in 1983, the team performed poorly in the Test arena, including 28 consecutive Test matches without a victory. However, India won the Asia Cup in 1984 and won the World Championship of Cricket in Australia in 1985. The 1987 Cricket World Cup was held in India and Pakistan – the first time it was played outside England.

From the 1993–94 season, the Duleep Trophy was converted from a knockout competition to a league format.

Several team names and spellings were altered during the 1990s when traditional Indian names were introduced to replace those that were associated with the British Raj. Most notably, Bombay became Mumbai and the famous venue of Madras became Chennai.

Despite its arrival in the 1700s, cricket's popularity grew steadily as it spread across regions. It became a unifying factor in the country, transcending social and cultural barriers. The sport was initially popular amongst the elite, but it began to transcend as people from lower castes came together to play, watch, and engage with the sport. Post-independence, cricket continued to flourish and became an integral part of the nation's fabric, particularly in its rivalries, the most prominent of which is India v Pakistan. The Board of Control for Cricket in India (BCCI) emerged as a pivotal force, steering the sport toward globalization. Technology also played a crucial role by increasing accessibility, bringing live cricket matches into homes and amplifying its reach and impact.

A significant change in cricket's globalization in India came with success on the international stage. Victories in major tournaments aided in global reach, but a tipping point occurred in the win of 1983 Cricket World Cup. This tournament was led by Kapil Dev, with Sunil Gavaskar and Sachin Tendulkar also becoming prominent figures in the sport's growing popularity during this period. These players came from backgrounds outside the traditional upper-class elite, emerging as cultural icons who represented the dreams and aspirations of Indians and foster fostering a great sense of pride. Their success on the global stage in a post-colonial India resonated deeply with India as it evoked pride and honor which many had not felt in a long time.

In addition to the increased sense of nationalism which aided in its globalization, cricket mirrored the changing socio-political landscape of India. By shifting a once elite sport into something accessible to the masses, the sport echoed societal transformations with the rise of the middle class. Cricket became a vessel for social mobility and offered opportunities and hope to people across India regardless of their religion, caste, or social standing. With the increased popularity of the sport in India, especially in the 1980s, international satellite television networks began broadcasting cricket because of its global audience and the newly emerged market of viewers in India. In order to secure their place, these networks negotiated broadcasting rights with the Board of Control for Cricket in India (BCCI) which gave the BCCI an immense amount of wealth which further aided in the globalization of cricket.

In addition to its spread through television, its globalization has a direct link to India's increase in consumerism. As the sport became increasingly popular in India in the 1980s into and 1990s, India experienced a rapid expansion of both televised and billboard advertising. As a result, it became common for various teams and individual cricket players to promote various consumer goods which aided in its globalization.

=== 21st century ===
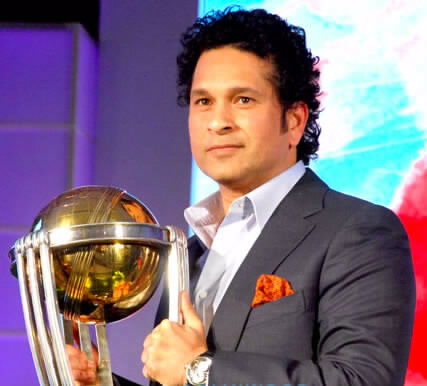
Sachin Tendulkar is one of the greatest cricketers of all time. He is known as the 'God of Cricket'.

Sachin Tendulkar was one of the key members during 1989–2013 for Team India in multiple formats.

Since 2000, the Indian team underwent major improvements with the appointment of John Wright, India's first ever foreign coach. This appointment met success internationally as India maintained their unbeaten home record against Australia in Test series after defeating them in 2001 and won the inaugural ICC World Twenty20 in 2007. India was also the first sub-continental team to win at the WACA in January 2008 against Australia.

India's victory against the Australians in 2001 marked the beginning of a dream era for the team under the captainship of Sourav Ganguly, winning Test matches in Zimbabwe, Sri Lanka, West Indies and England. India were joint winners with Sri Lanka in the ICC Champions Trophy and reached the final of the 2003 Cricket World Cup only to be beaten by Australia.

In September 2007, India won the first ever T20 World Cup held in South Africa, beating their arch-rivals Pakistan by 5 runs in a thrilling final.

India won the Cricket World Cup in 2011 under the captaincy of Mahendra Singh Dhoni, the first time since 1983 (28 years) – they beat Sri Lanka in the final held in Mumbai's Wankhede Stadium.

India won the Champions Trophy in 2013 by defeating England in England.

India played its 500th Test match against New Zealand led by Kane Williamson at Kanpur from 22 to 26 September 2016. India won this match by 197 runs. Virat Kohli captained India in this test.

On 29 June 2024, India won the 2024 T20 World Cup by defeating South Africa in the final. They became the third team after England and West Indies to win the cup twice and also the first team to win the tournament undefeated.

On 9 March 2025, India won the 2025 Champions Trophy undefeated. The team defeated New Zealand in the final. This was India's third consecutive final of the tournament, as well as fourth consecutive ICC final. India became the first team to win the tournament thrice.

On 2 November 2025, India won their first Women's Cricket World Cup, defeating South Africa by 52 runs in the final at the DY Patil Stadium in Navi Mumbai. In the semi-final, they chased a huge target of 339 runs against Australia, which is one also the highest successful run chases in the history of Women's ODI. The victory was widely celebrated and recognized across India as a landmark moment for women's cricket in the country.

In the 2026 Men's T20 World Cup, India defeated New Zealand in the final. This made India the only team to win back-to-back T20 World Cups (2024 and 2026), and a record three titles in the T20 World Cup.

== Administration ==
The Board of Control for Cricket in India (BCCI) is the principal national governing body of cricket in India. Its headquarters are situated at the Cricket Centre in Wankhede Stadium, Mumbai. The BCCI is the wealthiest governing body of cricket in the world. The BCCI is involved in talent development through grassroots programs and cricket academies. Its initiatives include infrastructure development, coaching, and player welfare programs designed to maintain and enhance India's competitive performance internationally.

The BCCI was established on 1 December 1928 in erstwhile Madras (presently Chennai) under Act XXI of 1860 of Madras and was subsequently reregistered under the Tamil Nadu Societies Registration Act, 1975. It is a consortium of state cricket associations that select their own representatives who elect the BCCI president. It joined the Imperial Cricket Conference in 1926, which later became the International Cricket Council (ICC).The BCCI is an autonomous, private organization that does not fall under the purview of the National Sports Federation of India of Government of India and does not receive any grants from the Ministry of Youth Affairs and Sports. The BCCI is influential in international cricket. The International Cricket Council shares the largest part of its revenue with the BCCI. The Indian Premier League (IPL) run by BCCI is one of the wealthiest sports leagues in the world.

== National teams ==
The India national cricket team is governed by the Board of Control for Cricket in India (BCCI) and is a member of the Asian Cricket Council (ACC). Since 1926, the BCCI has been affiliated with ICC, the international governing body for world cricket. In 1983, the BCCI became one of the founding members of the ACC.

=== Performance ===
The following list includes the performance of all of India's national teams at major competitions.

==== Men's senior team ====
The Indian cricket team is one of the most successful cricket teams in the world, having won 2 Cricket World Cups, 3 T20 World Cups, 3 Champions Trophies, and finishing runners up twice in World Test Championships.

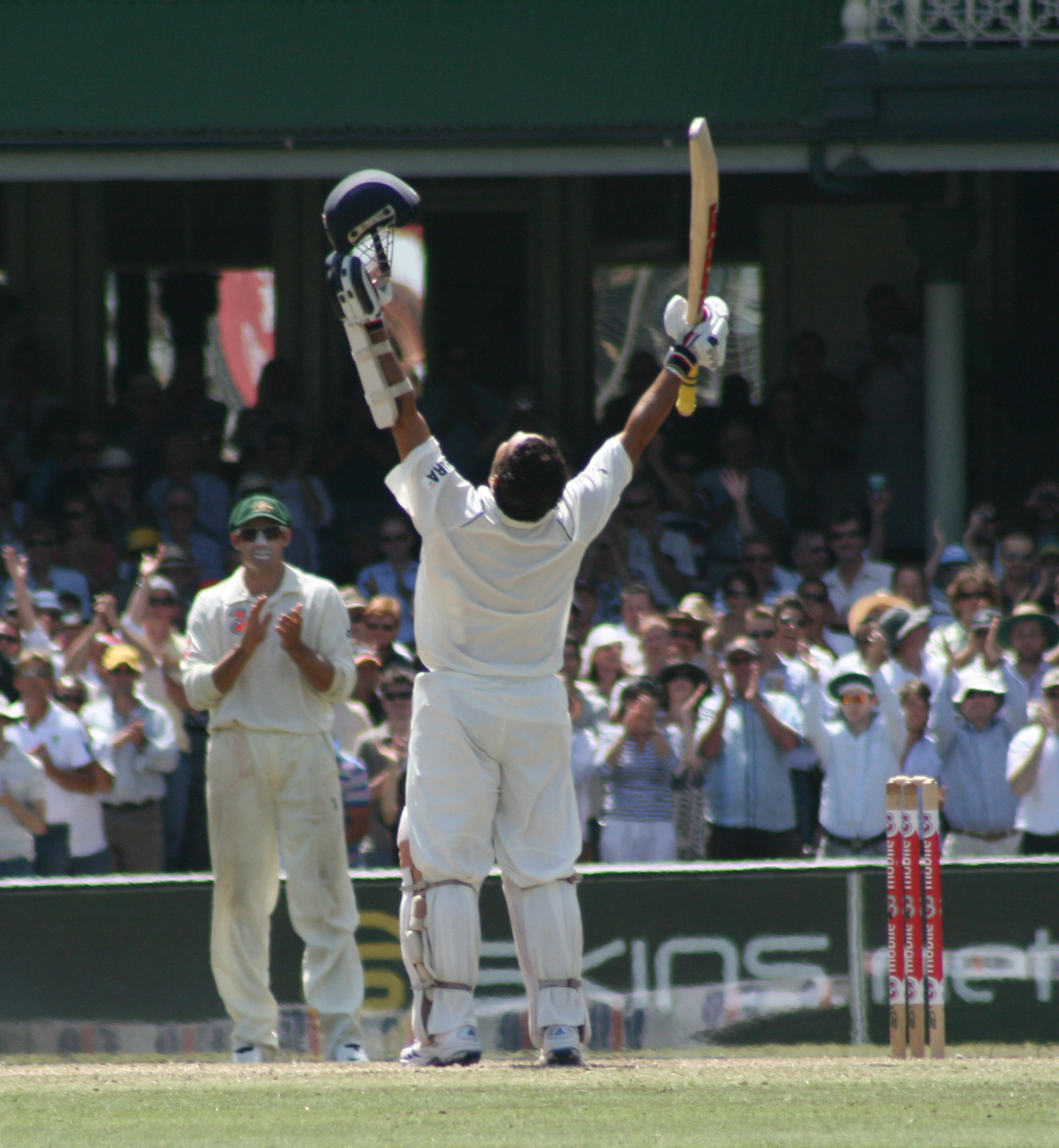
Tendulkar, upon reaching his 38th Test century against Australia in the 2nd Test at the SCG in 2008, where he finished not out on 154

Tournament	Appearance in finals	Last appearance	Best performance
Cricket World Cup	4 out of 13	2023	Champions (1983, 2011)
T20 World Cup	4 out of 10	2026	Champions (2007, 2024, 2026)
Champions Trophy	5 out of 9	2025	Champions (2002, 2013, 2025)
World Test Championship	2 out of 3	2023–25	Runners-up (2019–21, 2021–23)
Asia Cup	12 out of 17	2025	Champions (1984, 1988, 1990–1991, 1995, 2010, 2016, 2018, 2023, 2025)
Commonwealth Games	0 out of 1	1998	Group Stage (1998)
Asian Games	2 out of 4	2026	Gold Medal (2022), (2026)

==== Women's senior team ====
The Indian cricket team has won the Women's Cricket World Cup once in 2025, and have reached the finals of the Women's T20 World Cup once in 2020.

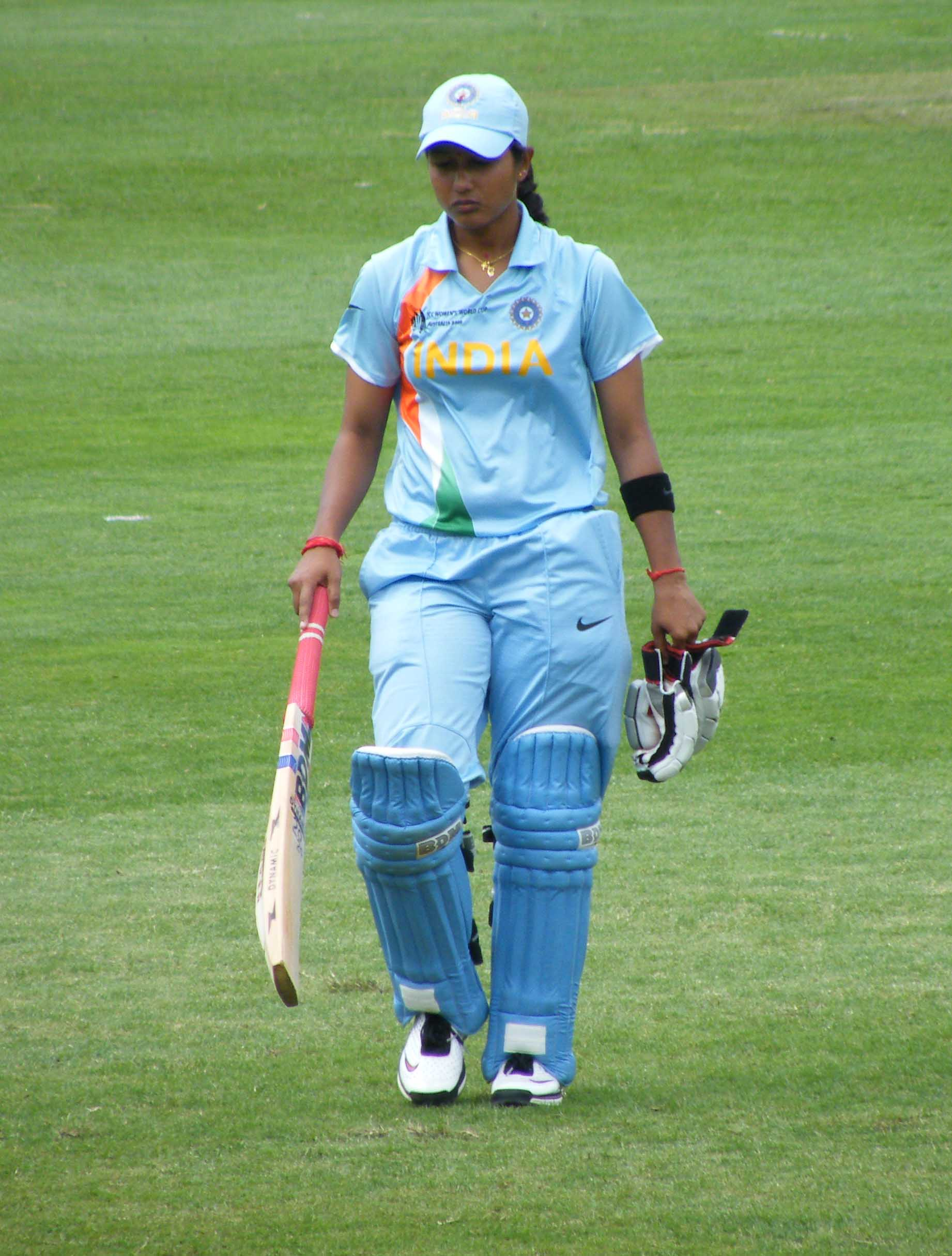
Indian batter at the Women's Cricket World Cup 2010

Tournament	Appearance in finals	Last appearance	Best performance
Women's Cricket World Cup	3 out of 13	2025	Champions (2025)
Women's T20 World Cup	1 out of 10	2026	Runners-up (2020)
Women's Asia Cup	8 out of 10	2026	Champions (2004, 2005-2006, 2006, 2008, 2012, 2016, 2022, 2026)
Commonwealth Games	1 out of 1	2022	Silver Medal (2022)
Asian Games	2 out of 4	2026	Gold Medal (2022, 2026)

==== Men's A team ====
Tournament	Appearance in finals	Last appearance	Best performance
Asia Cup Rising Stars	3 out of 7	2025	Champions (2013)

==== Women's A team ====
Tournament	Finals appearance	Last appearance	Best performance
Women's Asia Cup Rising Stars	2 out of 2	2026	Champions (2023), (2026)

==== Men's U-19 team ====
Tournament	Appearance in finals	Last appearance	Best performance
U19 Cricket World Cup	10 out of 16	2026	Champions (2000, 2008, 2012, 2018, 2022, 2026)
U19 Asia Cup	10 out of 12	2026	Champions (1989, 2003, 2012, 2013-14, 2016, 2018, 2019, 2021, 2026)

==== Women's U-19 team ====
Tournament	Appearance in finals	Last appearance	Best performance
U19 Women's T20 World Cup	2 out of 2	2025	Champions (2023, 2025)
U19 Women's T20 Asia Cup	1 out of 1	2024	Champions (2024)

== Affiliated state associations and leagues ==
Membership of the Board of Control for Cricket in India is made up of Full Members and Associate Members.

=== Full Members ===
The majority of full members are state cricket associations which are affiliated with the BCCI. Each state is permitted one representative, except for Gujarat and Maharashtra, which have three. There are additional representatives from Indian Railways, Services and Universities. Changes recommended by the Lodha Committee, such as restricting full membership to state associations and limiting states to one full member (with the others becoming associate members) have not been fully adopted by the BCCI. Existing members retaining full membership except for the Cricket Club of India in Mumbai and the National Cricket Club in Kolkata are:

No.	Name	Represents	President	Zone
1	Andhra Cricket Association	Andhra Pradesh	P. Sarath Chandra Reddy	South
2	Arunachal Cricket Association	Arunachal Pradesh	T. C. Tok	North East
3	Assam Cricket Association	Assam	Taranga Gogoi	East
4	Baroda Cricket Association	Vadodara	Pranav Amin	West
5	Bihar Cricket Association	Bihar	Rakesh Kumar Tiwary	East
6	Chhattisgarh State Cricket Sangh	Chhattisgarh	Jubin Shah	Central
7	Cricket Association of Bengal	West Bengal	Snehasish Ganguly	East
8	Cricket Association of Mizoram	Mizoram	Lalrochhuanga Pachuau	North East
9	Cricket Association of Pondicherry	Puducherry	G.M. Arunkumar	South
10	Cricket Association of Uttarakhand	Uttarakhand	Jot Singh Gunsola	Central
11	Delhi & District Cricket Association	Delhi	Rohan Jaitley	North
12	Goa Cricket Association	Goa	Vipul Phadke	South
13	Gujarat Cricket Association	Gujarat (excluding Saurashtra and Vadodara)	Dhanraj Nathwani	West
14	Haryana Cricket Association	Haryana	Paramjit Mann	North
15	Himachal Pradesh Cricket Association	Himachal Pradesh	Arun Dhumal	North
16	Hyderabad Cricket Association	Telangana	Jagan Mohan Rao	South
17	Jammu & Kashmir Cricket Association	Jammu and Kashmir	Anil Gupta	North
18	Jharkhand State Cricket Association	Jharkhand	Sanjay Sahay	East
19	Karnataka State Cricket Association	Karnataka	Venkatesh Prasad	South
20	Kerala Cricket Association	Kerala	Jayesh George	South
21	Madhya Pradesh Cricket Association	Madhya Pradesh	Abhilash Khandekar	Central
22	Maharashtra Cricket Association	Maharashtra (excluding Mumbai and Vidarbha)	Rohit Rajendra Pawar	West
23	Manipur Cricket Association	Manipur	Nongthombam Zico Meetei	North East
24	Meghalaya Cricket Association	Meghalaya	Danny Marak	North East
25	Mumbai Cricket Association	Mumbai	Amol Kale	West
26	Nagaland Cricket Association	Nagaland	Kechangulie Rio	North East
27	Odisha Cricket Association	Odisha	Pranab Prakash Das	East
28	Punjab Cricket Association	Punjab	Gulzar Inder Chahal	North
29	Railways Sports Promotion Board	Indian Railways	D. K. Gayen	Central
30	Rajasthan Cricket Association	Rajasthan	Vaibhav Gahlot	Central
31	Saurashtra Cricket Association	Saurashtra	Jaydev Shah	West
32	Services Sports Control Board	Indian Armed Forces	Varun Singh	North
33	Sikkim Cricket Association	Sikkim	Tika Subba	North East
34	Tamil Nadu Cricket Association	Tamil Nadu	Dr. P. Ashok Sigamani	South
35	Union Territory Cricket Association	Chandigarh	-	North
36	Tripura Cricket Association	Tripura	Tapan Lodh	East
37	Uttar Pradesh Cricket Association	Uttar Pradesh	Dr. Nidhipati Singhania	Central
38	Vidarbha Cricket Association	Vidarbha	Vinay Deshpande	Central

=== Associate Members ===
All members not meeting the criteria for full members are classified as associate members. They include:

No.	Name	Represents	President	Zone
1	Association of Indian Universities	Indian Universities	Vinay Kumar Pathak	–
2	Cricket Club of India	–	Madhumati Lele	–

== States and union territories Leagues list ==
=== Current leagues ===
Men's
State/Union Territories	League	First	Status	Latest	ref
Assam	Assam Premier League	2026	Active		
Andhra Pradesh	Andhra Premier League	2023	Active	2026	
Chhattisgarh	Chhattisgarh Cricket Premier League		Active		
Jharkhand	Jharkhand T20 League	2026	Active		
Kerala	Kerala Cricket League	2024	Active		
Karnataka	Maharaja Trophy KSCA T20	2023	Active	2026	
Madhya Pradesh	Madhya Pradesh League	2024	Active		
Maharashtra (excluding Mumbai and Vidarbha)	Maharashtra Premier League	2023	Active	2025	
Odisha	Odisha Pro T20 League				
Punjab	Sher-E-Punjab T20 League	2023	Active	2026	
Tamil Nadu	Tamil Nadu Premier League				
Telangana	TG20	2026	Active		
Uttarakhand	Uttarakhand Premier League				
Uttar Pradesh	UP T20 League	2023	Active		
West Bengal	Bengal Pro T20 League	2024	Active	2026	
union territories Leagues
Delhi	Delhi Premier League T20	2024	Active	2026	
Puducherry	Pondicherry Premier League	2023	Active	2026	
other Leagues
Mumbai (Note: It is not a state, but there is separate association for administrating cricket in Mumbai of Maharashtra.)	T20 Mumbai	2023	Active	2026	
Vadodara (Note: It is not a state, but there is separate association for administrating cricket in Vadodara of Gujarat.)	Baroda Premier League	2025	Active	2026	
Vidarbha (Note: It is not a state, but there is separate association for administrating cricket in Vidarbha of Maharashtra.)	Vidarbha Premier League	2025	Active	2026	
Saurashtra (Note: It is not a state, but there is separate association for administrating cricket in Saurashtra of Gujarat.)	Saurashtra Pro T20 League				

Women's
State/Union Territories	League	Status	First	Latest	ref
Delhi	Women's Delhi Premier League T20				
Madhya Pradesh
Maharashtra	Women's Maharashtra Premier League				
West Bengal	Women's Bengal Pro T20 League				
Uttarakhand	Women's Uttarakhand Premier League				
Vidarbha

=== Future League ===
State	Status
Arunachal Pradesh	
Bihar
Goa
Gujrat
Haryana
Himachal Pradesh
Manipur
Meghalaya
Mizoram
Nagaland
Rajasthan
Sikkim
Tripura

=== Defunct leagues ===
League	State	Years	Notes
Rajasthan Premier League	Rajasthan	2023	
Saurashtra Premier League			

== Organisation of cricket in modern India ==
=== International cricket ===
International cricket in India generally does not follow a fixed pattern, unlike the English schedule under where England tours other countries during their winter and plays at home during their summer. Generally, there has recently been a tendency to play more one-day matches than Test matches. Cricket in India is managed by the Board of Control for Cricket in India (BCCI), the richest cricket board in the cricket world.

==== Men's National Team ====
The India National Cricket Team represents India in international cricket matches.

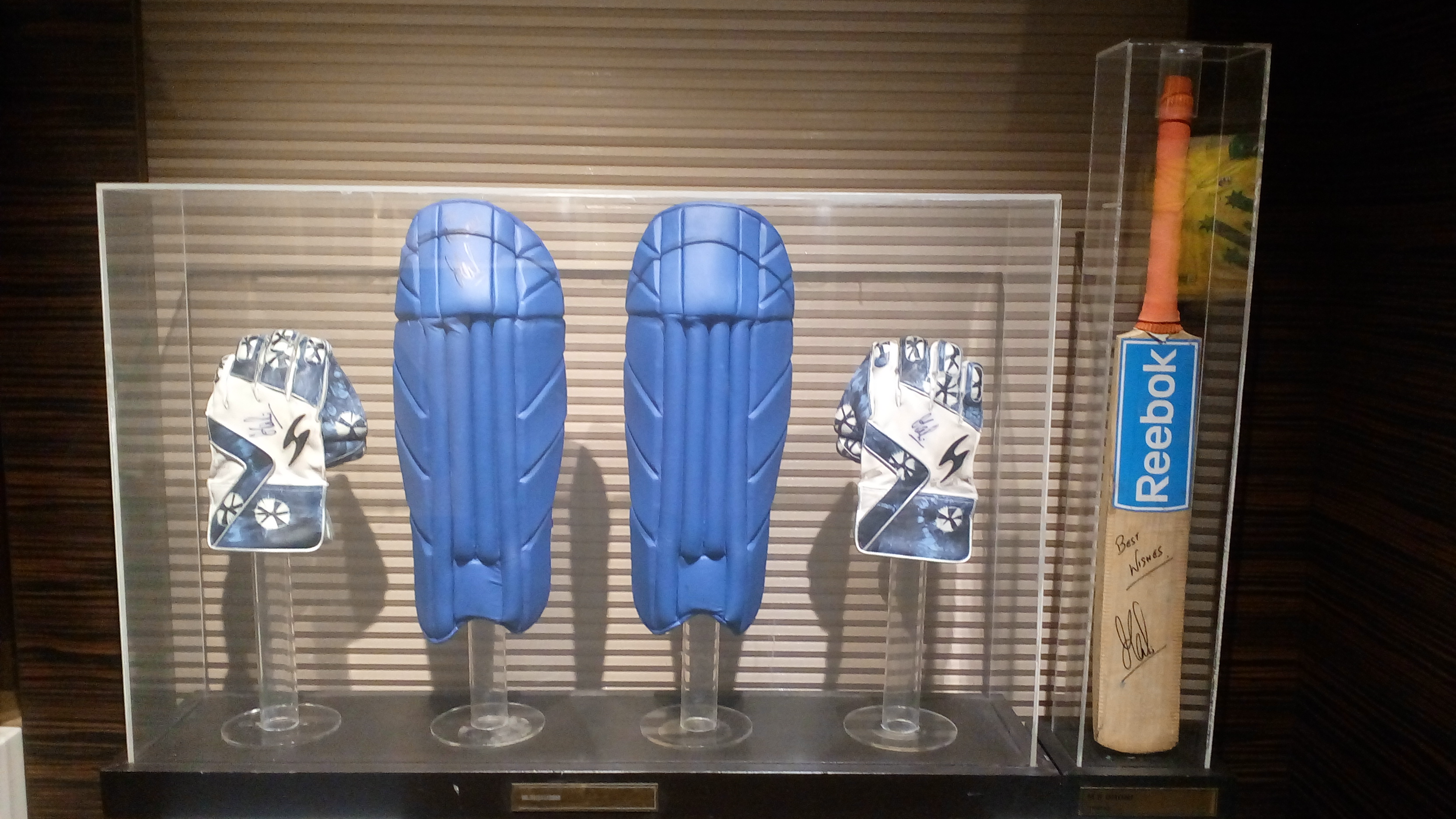
Wicket-keeping kit and bat used by Dhoni during the 2011 Cricket World Cup on display at the Blades of Glory Cricket Museum

India has been participating in international cricket since 1926 and competed in international tournaments since the first ever 1975 Cricket World Cup. They have competed in numerous tournaments over the years including the ACC tournaments. The Indian national cricket team has also provided some of the greatest players to the world, the biggest example of which is Sachin Tendulkar. Indian cricket has a rich history. The Indian men's national team is currently ranked No. 1 in Tests, No. 1 in ODIs and at 1st position in T20Is. India won the Cricket World Cup in 1983 under the captaincy of Kapil Dev and won it again in 2011 under the captaincy of Mahendra Singh Dhoni, after a 28-year drought. They also won the World Championship of Cricket in 1985.

- Test-
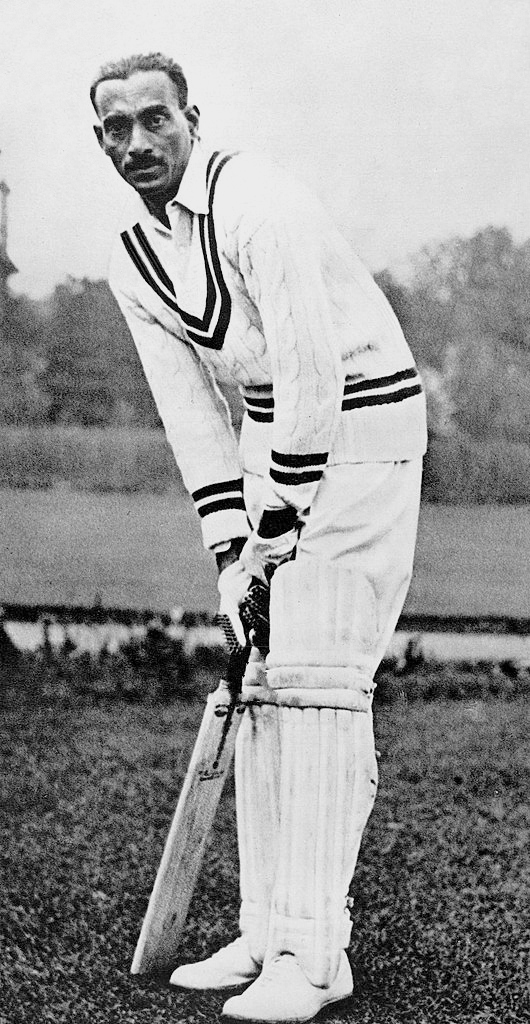
  C. K. Nayudu, India's first Test cricket captain
  India was invited to the International Cricket Council in 1926, and made their debut as a Test playing nation in England in 1932, led by CK Nayudu, who was considered the best Indian batsman at the time. The one-off Test match between the two sides was played at Lord's in London. The team was not strong in their batting at this point and went on to lose by 158 runs. India hosted its first men's Test cricket series in 1933. England was the visiting team that played two Tests in Bombay (now Mumbai) and Calcutta (now Kolkata). The visitors won the series 2–0. The Indian team continued to improve throughout the 1930s and 1940s but did not achieve an international victory during this period. In the early 1940s, India did not play any men's Test cricket due to World War II. The team's first series as an independent country was in late 1947 against Don Bradman's Australian cricket team in England in 1948 (a name given to the Australia national cricket team of that time). It was also the first Test series India played which was not against England. Australia men's cricket team won the five-match series 4–0, with Bradman tormenting the Indian bowling in his final Australian summer.
- One Day International-
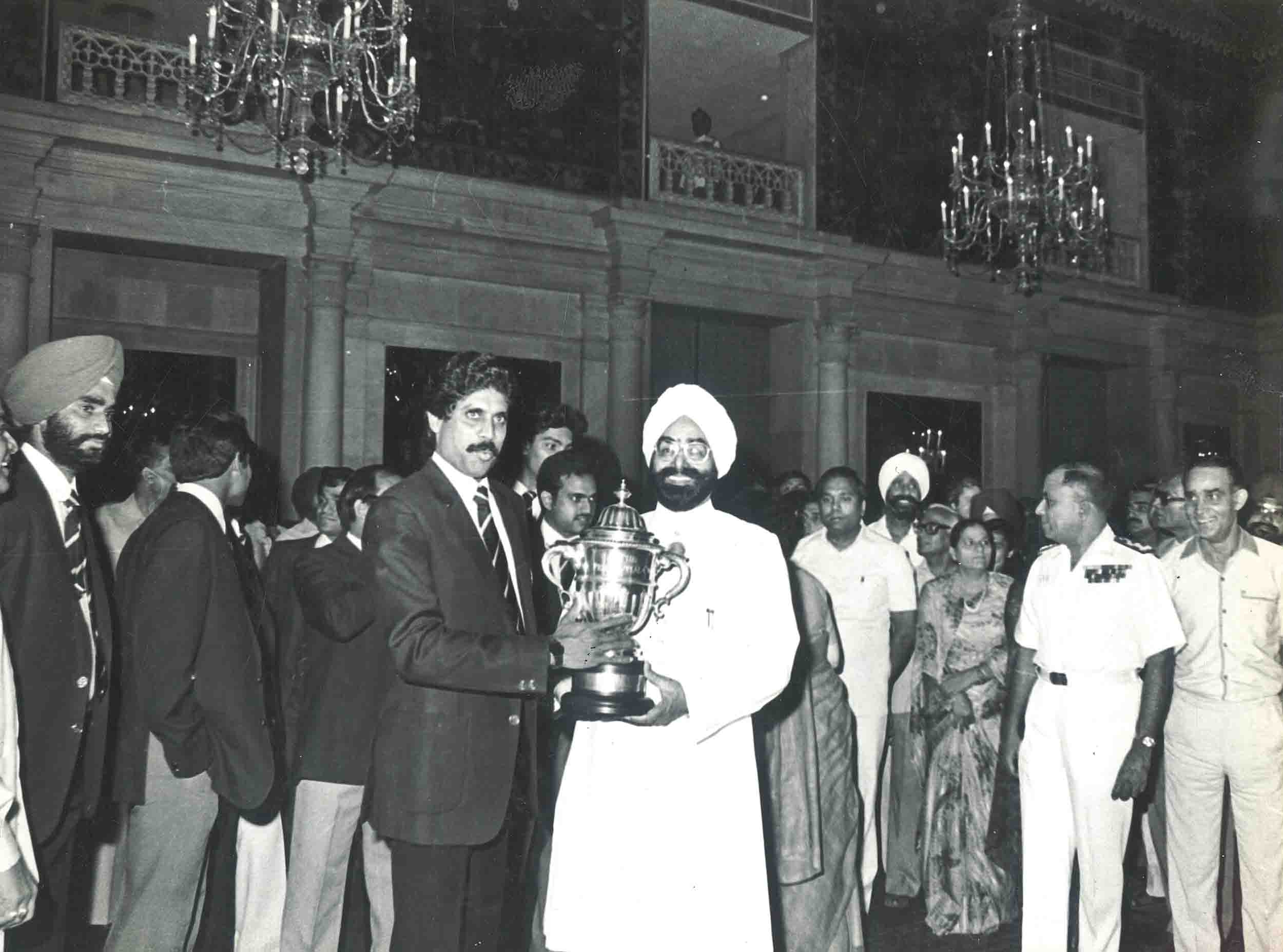
  Dev with the Indian President Zail Singh after the team's return to India post winning the World Cup. They are holding the Cricket World Cup Trophy.
  The advent of men's One Day International (ODI) cricket in 1971 created a new dimension in the cricket world. However, India was not considered strong in ODIs at this point and batsmen such as the captain Gavaskar were known for their defensive approach to batting. India began as a weak team in ODIs and did not qualify for the second round in the first two editions of the Cricket World Cup. Gavaskar infamously blocked his way to 36 not out off 174 balls against England in the first World Cup in 1975; India scored just 132 for 3 and lost by 202 runs. In contrast, India fielded a strong team in Test matches and was particularly strong at home, where their combination of stylish batsmen and beguiling spinners were at their best. India set a then Test record in the third Test against the West Indies at Port-of-Spain in 1976, when they chased 403 to win, thanks to 112 from Viswanath. In November 1976, the team established another record by scoring 524 for 9 declared against New Zealand at Kanpur without any individual batsman scoring a century. This innings was only the eighth instance in Test cricket where all eleven batsmen reached double figures. During the 1980s, India developed a more attack-minded batting line-up with stroke makers such as the wristy Mohammad Azharuddin, Dilip Vengsarkar and all-rounders Kapil Dev and Ravi Shastri. India won the Cricket World Cup in 1983, defeating the favourites and the two-time defending champions West Indies in the final at Lord's, owing to a strong bowling performance. In spite of this, the team performed poorly in the Test arena, including 28 consecutive Test matches without a victory. In 1984, India won the Asia Cup and in 1985, won the World Championship of Cricket in Australia. Apart from this, India remained a weak team outside the Indian subcontinent. India's Test series victory in 1986 against England remained the last Test series win by India outside the subcontinent for the next 19 years. The 1980s saw Gavaskar and Kapil Dev (India's best all-rounder to date) at the pinnacle of their careers. Gavaskar made a Test record 34 centuries as he became the first man to reach the 10,000 run mark. Kapil Dev later became the highest wicket-taker in Test cricket with 434 wickets.
- T20 International- India played there first T2O International in 2006 against South Africa. In September 2007, India won the first-ever ICC Men's T20 World Cup held in South Africa, beating Pakistan by five runs in the final. In the 2014 ICC Men's World Twenty20 hosted in Bangladesh, India narrowly missed out on another ICC trophy by losing to Sri Lanka in the final.

==== Women's National Team ====
The India national women's cricket team represents India in international women's cricket matches.

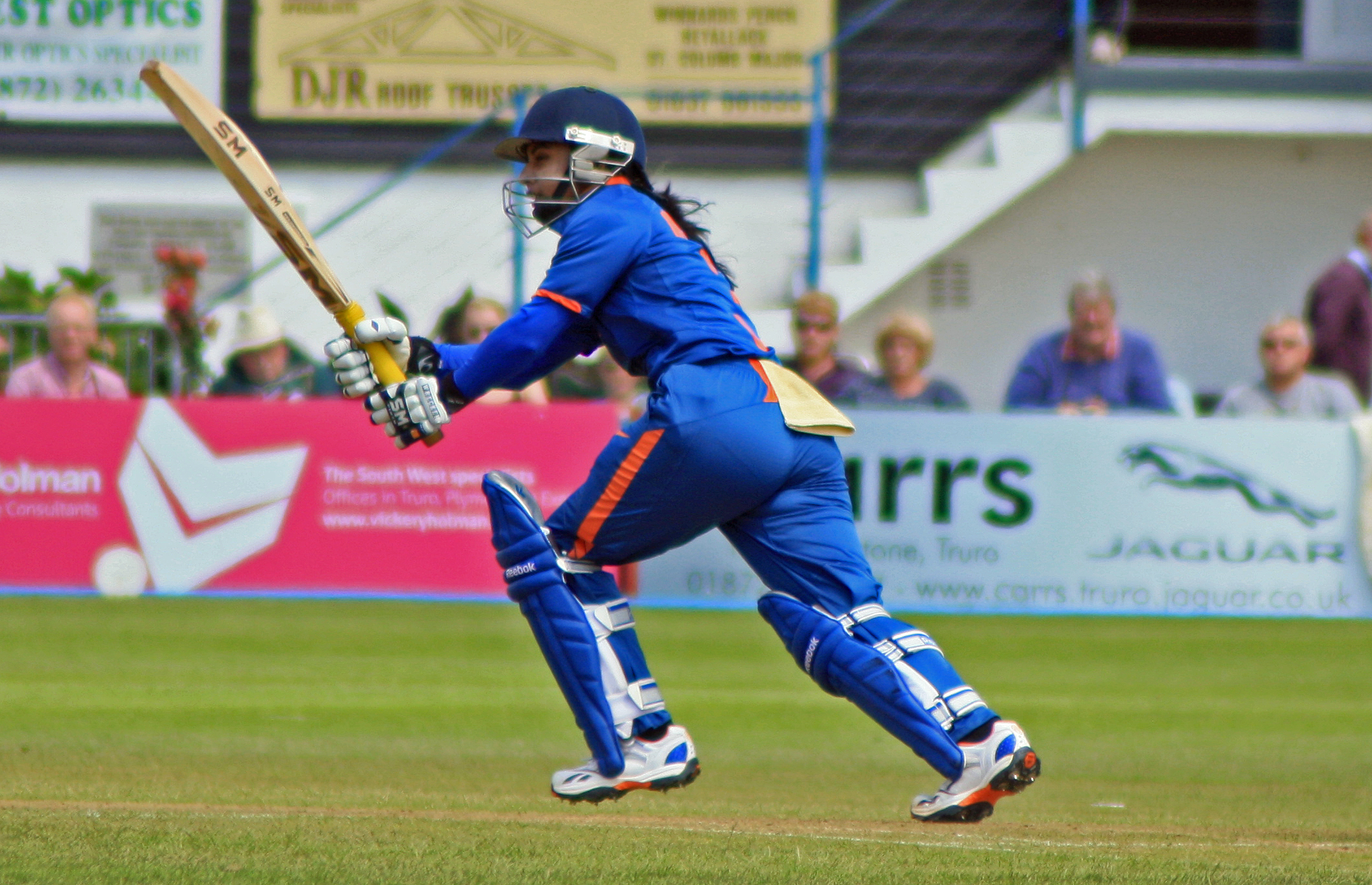
Mithali Raj is the highest run-scorer in women's international cricket.

India has participated in international cricket since 1976 and competed in international tournament since the second ever the 1978 Women's Cricket World Cup. They have competed in numerous tournaments over the years including the ACC tournaments. They are the most successful women's cricket team in Asia. The Indian Women's national team is also currently ranked No. 4 in ODIs and at 3rd position in T20Is.

- Test International- India made their debut as a Test playing nation in 1976 against West Indies. In past time, India women's rarely play test and won it. But in recent years they are playing more test matches and winning it to.
- One Day International-India played their first ODI International in 1978 against England. They were not able to participate in first edition of Women's Cricket World Cup. But in late 19s they have reached to ODI world cup semis consequently and in 2017 Women's Cricket World Cup they have almost clinch the title in the finals.
- T20 International- India played their first T20 International in 2006 against England. India Women's have made great impact in T20 international from their early day of this format. They have been in semis of ICC Women's T20 World Cup consequently in first 2 Edition.

=== Domestic Cricket ===
==== Men's Domestic Cricket ====
===== First class competitions =====
- Ranji Trophy – It was founded as the 'Cricket Championship of India' at a meeting of the Board of Control for Cricket in India in July 1934. The first Ranji Trophy fixtures took place in the 1934–35 season. Syed Mohammed Hadi of Hyderabad was the first batsman to score a century in the tournament. The Trophy was donated by H. H. Sir Bhupendra Singh Mahinder Baha-dur, Maharajah of Patiala in memory of his late Highness Sir Ranjitsinhji Vibhaji of Nawanagar, affectionately called Ranjitsinhji. In the main, the Ranji Trophy is composed of teams representing the states that makeup India. The number of competing teams has increased over the years. Some states have more than one cricket team, e.g., Maharashtra and Gujarat. There are also teams for Railways and Services representing the armed forces. The various teams used to be grouped into zones – North, West, East, Central and South – and the initial matches were played on a league basis within the zones. The top two teams until 1991–92 and then the top three teams in the subsequent years from each zone then played in a national knock-out competition. Starting with the 2002–03 season, the zonal system was abandoned and a two-division structure was adopted with two teams being promoted from the plate league and two relegated from the elite league. If the knockout matches are not finished, they are decided on the first-inning lead.
- Duleep Trophy – Named after Duleepsinhji, the Duleep Trophy competition, which is a first-class competition, was started by the Board of Control for Cricket in India in 1961–62 with the aim of providing a greater competitive edge in domestic cricket, because apart from the knock-out stages of the Ranji Trophy, that competition proved to be highly predictable, with Bombay winning the Ranji Trophy for fifteen consecutive years. The Duleep Trophy was also meant to help the selectors to assess the form of top cricketers playing against each other. The original format had five teams, which were drawn from the five zones (i.e. North, South, East, West and central) and played each other on a knock-out basis. From the 1993–94 season, the competition has been converted to a league format.
- Irani Trophy – The Irani Trophy tournament was conceived during the 1959–60 season to mark the completion of 25 years of the Ranji Trophy championship and was named after the late Z. R. Irani, who was associated with the Board of Control for Cricket in India (BCCI) from its inception in 1928, till his death in 1970 and a keen patron of the game. The first match, played between the Ranji Trophy champions and the Rest of India was played in 1959–60. For the first few years, it was played at the tail end of the season. Realising the importance of the fixture, the BCCI moved it to the beginning of the season. Since 1965–66, it has traditionally heralded the start of the new domestic season. The Irani Trophy game ranks high in popularity and importance. It is one of the few domestic matches followed with keen interest by cricket lovers in the country. Leading players take part in the game, which has often been a sort of selection trial to pick the Indian team for foreign tours.

===== Limited overs competitions =====
- Deodhar Trophy – Started in 1973–74 by Board of Control for Cricket in India, it is a one-day cricket competition in Indian domestic cricket. It was formerly contested by 5 zonal teams – North zone, South zone, East zone, West zone and Central zone. From 2015–16 to 2017–18, it was contested by the winners of the Vijay Hazare Trophy, India A and India B. Starting in 2018–19 it has featured India A, India B and India C.
- Vijay Hazare Trophy – Named after the prolific Indian cricketer Vijay Hazare, the Trophy was started in 2002–03 as an attempt to bring the limited-overs game among a greater audience. The competition involves the state (and other) teams from the Ranji Trophy battling in a 50-over format. Since its conception, Tamil Nadu and Mumbai have won the trophy the most times (5). It is also dubbed as the Premier Cup by BCCI.

===== Twenty20 competitions =====
- Indian Premier League – In response to the rival ICL, the BCCI started the Twenty20 competition known as the Indian Premier League (IPL), which is regarded as the brainchild of Lalit Modi. This League was launched by BCCI in 2007–08 and received widespread recognition from around the country. The players were selected via the auctions and drafted into the city-based franchises. The first IPL season was held from 18 April 2008 to 1 June 2008 where underdogs Rajasthan Royals, led by Shane Warne, won the first title at the DY Patil Stadium in Navi Mumbai Based on regional loyalties, the eight-team tournament brings a unique and popular team and player auction system hand-picking some of the best international players in the world and teaming them with Indian players, both domestic and international, in one arena. The total prize money for the IPL was $3 million. The IPL has also Americanized cricket by adding cheerleaders and creating a setting of non stop action similar to sporting events in the USA. The IPL tournament consists of 10 different city based franchises.
- Syed Mushtaq Ali Trophy – After India became another member of the ICC Twenty20 and played its first international T20 against South Africa, the BCCI launched its own state structure in 2006–07 season, with 27 Ranji teams divided in 5 Zones. The final was played between Punjab and Tamil Nadu, which the latter won by 2 wickets with 2 balls remaining, thereby becoming the only ever winner of this series. In this series, Rohit Sharma also became the only ever Indian to register a T20 century for Mumbai against Gujarat. The competition was later replaced by the franchise-based IPL. Played for the first time in the 2008–09 season, this is the first of its kind zonal T20 championship and the third overall in the Indian cricket season, which would see Ranji teams divided along zonal lines into two groups with the tournament culminating in the All India T20 final between the winners of the two groups for the Syed Mushtaq Ali Trophy. It was launched after the success of the IPL and the need of the BCCI to search for more talent in the growing regions of cricket.

In 2020, stronger crowd participation was seen than in other forms of the game. It has been greatly acknowledged by people and has made huge profits.

===== Youth competitions =====
- CK Nayudu Trophy - It is a domestic cricket championship played in India between under-23 teams representing various state and regional cricket associations. It is organised by the Board of Control for Cricket in India (BCCI) and is named after India's first Test cricket captain C. K. Nayudu. Each match is played over four-days. Over its history, it has been played with various age-limits including under-22, under-23, under-25. The current champions are Gujarat who defeated Mumbai in the 2023 final.
- Mens Under-23 State A Trophy
- Cooch Behar Trophy – An inter-state U-19 4-day matches tournament.
- Vinoo Mankad Trophy – A trophy tournament for under-19, in memories of famous cricketer Vinoo Mankad.

==== Women's Domestic Cricket ====
===== First class competitions =====
- Senior Women's Inter Zonal Multi-Day Trophy -It is an Indian women's cricket first-class domestic competition organised by the Board of Control for Cricket in India. The competition began in 2014–15, as a two-day competition, with the three subsequent competitions in 2015–16, 2016–17 and 2017–18 operating with a three-day format.The competition features five teams, each representing a region (or "zone") of India: Central Zone, East Zone, North Zone, South Zone and West Zone. Central Zone are the most successful team in the history of the competition, winning the first three editions. The holders are North Zone, who won the most recent competition in 2017–18.

===== Limited overs competitions =====
- Senior Women's One Day Trophy – Started in season 2006–07, it is the women's List-A cricket tournament. Railways women has been the most dominant team, winning 10 out of the 11 tournaments. It was played in round-robin format at zonal level and the top performing team then playing in the super league. The format was changed in season 2013–14, since then it is played in 2 tiers, with states being divided in 5 groups, 2 in elite group and 3 in plate group. Finalists in the plate group, at the end of season are promoted to the elite group and 2 bottom most performing teams in the elite group are relegated to the plate group.
- Senior Women's One Day Inter Zonal Trophy-

===== Twenty20 competitions =====
- Women's Premier League – It is a women's Twenty20 cricket franchise league in India, owned and operated by the Board of Control for Cricket in India (BCCI).
- Senior Women's T20 Trophy – It is a women's Twenty20 competition. It is played between full members of BCCI. The inaugural tournament was held in the 2008–09 season. Since then it has taken place every year with 2015–16 being the 8th edition.
- Senior Women's T20 Inter Zonal Trophy –

===== Youth competitions =====
- Women's under 23 One Day Trophy
- Women's under 23 T20 Trophy
- Women's under 19 One Day Trophy
- Women's under 19 T20 Trophy
- Women's under 15 One Day Trophy

== Stadiums ==
India has many international standards Cricket stadiums. The world's largest cricket stadium, Narendra Modi Stadium, is located in India. Eden Gardens of Kolkata, the 3rd largest cricket stadium in the world, is situated in West Bengal. The domestic cricket governing bodies such as the State Cricket Association controls cricket related activities and sanctioned tournaments in their respective regions and hence, there are 38 Ranji Teams. These domestic boards are affiliated to BCCI, while district cricket boards in the country are affiliated to state boards. The country has lots of private cricket academies and clubs. The world's 3rd largest cricket arena is being built in Jaipur. MRF Pace Foundation provide facilities to fast ballers.

=== Active stadiums ===
Name of the stadium	Location	Capacity	No. of Domestic matches played			No. of International matches played			First match	Latest match
Name of the stadium	Location	Capacity	Test	ODI	T20I	Test	ODI	T20I	First match	Latest match
M. A. Chidambaram Stadium	Chennai	38,200	34	28	2	18	11	7	10 February 1934	January 2025
Eden Gardens	Kolkata	68,000	42	36	11	16	21	15	5 January 1935	16 November 2023
Arun Jaitley Cricket Stadium	Delhi	35,200	35	31	7	19	9	6	10 November 1948	25 October 2023
Brabourne Stadium	Mumbai	50,000	18	9	1	5	11	10	9 December 1948	29 October 2018
Green Park Stadium	Kanpur	32,000	23	15	1	4	3	2	12 January 1952	25 November 2021
M. Chinnaswamy Stadium	Bengaluru	40,000	24	31	11	14	12	8	22 November 1974	17 January 2024
Wankhede Stadium	Mumbai	33,100	26	28	8	23	17	9	23 January 1975	2 January 2024
Barabati Stadium	Cuttack	45,000	2	19	3	1	8	0	27 January 1982	12 June 2022
Sawai Mansingh Stadium	Jaipur	30,000	1	19	1	0	9	0	2 October 1983	17 November 2021
Narendra Modi Stadium	Ahmedabad	132,000	15	31	7	3	4	12	12 November 1983	19 November 2023
Inderjit Singh Bindra Stadium	Mohali	27,000	14	26	7	6	5	3	22 November 1993	11 January 2024
IPCL Sports Complex Ground	Vadodara	20,000	0	10	0	0	11	3	16 December 1997	14 October 2019
YS Rajasekhara Reddy Stadium	Visakhapatnam	27,500	3	10	5	4	5	6	5 April 2005	2 February 2024
Rajiv Gandhi Stadium	Hyderabad	39,200	6	10	3	4	9	5	16 November 2005	25 January 2024
Holkar Stadium	Indore	30,000	3	7	4	2	2	3	15 April 2006	14 January 2024
VCA Stadium	Nagpur	45,000	7	9	13	0	3	2	6 November 2008	9 February 2023
Dr. DY Patil Sports Stadium	Navi Mumbai	45,300	0	0	0	1	0	2	11 November 2009	19 October 2023
MCA Stadium	Pune	42,700	2	12	4	4	9	8	20 December 2012	1 November 2023
SCA Stadium	Rajkot	28,000	3	4	5	3	2	4	11 January 2013	15 February 2024
JSCA Stadium	Ranchi	50,000	3	6	4	2	3	3	19 January 2013	23 February 2024
HPCA Stadium	Dharamshala	21,200	2	9	10	2	7	2	27 January 2013	7 March 2024
Greater Noida SC Ground	Greater Noida	8,000	0	5	6	1	0	0	8 March 2017	10 March 2020
ACA Stadium	Guwahati	46,000	0	2	5	0	2	3	10 October 2017	28 November 2023
Greenfield Stadium	Thiruvananthapuram	50,000	0	2	4	0	3	4	7 November 2017	26 November 2023
Rajiv Gandhi Stadium	Dehradun	25,000	1	5	6	0	0	0	3 June 2018	15 March 2019
BRSAB Vajpayee Ekana Stadium	Lucknow	50,100	1	9	6	0	2	3	6 November 2018	29 October 2023
Lalabhai Contractor Stadium	Surat	7,000	0	0	0	0	0	4	24 September 2019	4 October 2019
SV Narayan Singh Stadium	Raipur	65,000	0	1	1	0	1	2	21 January 2023	1 December 2023
Shrimant Madhavrao Scindia Cricket Stadium	Gwalior	50,000	0	0	0	0	0	1	6 October 2024	6 October 2024
Kotambi Stadium	Vadodara	40,000	0	0	0	0	0	3	22 December 2024	27 December 2024

== International competitions hosted ==
Competition	Edition	Winner	Final	Runners-up	India's position	Venues	Final venue	Stadium
Men's senior competitions
ICC Men's Cricket World Cup	1987 Cricket World Cup	Australia	253/5 (50 overs) – 246/8 (50 overs)	England	Semi-finals	21 (in 2 countries)	Eden Gardens	
Asia Cup	1990–91 Asia Cup	India	205/3 (42.1 overs) – 204/9 (45 overs)	Sri Lanka	Champions	3 (in 3 cities)	Eden Gardens	
ICC Men's Cricket World Cup	1996 Cricket World Cup	Sri Lanka	241/7 (50 overs) – 245/3 (46.2 overs)	Australia	Semi-finals	26 ( in 3 countries)	Gaddafi Stadium	
ICC Champions Trophy	2006 ICC Champions Trophy	Australia	116/2 (28.1 overs) - 138 (30.4 overs)	West Indies	Group stage	4 (in 4 cities)	Brabourne Stadium	
ICC Men's Cricket World Cup	2011 Cricket World Cup	India	277/4 (48.2 overs) – 274/6 (50 overs)	Sri Lanka	Champions	13 (in 3 countries)	Wankhede Stadium	
ICC Men's T20 World Cup	2016 ICC World Twenty20	West Indies	161/6 (19.4 overs) – 155/9 (20 overs)	England	Semi-finals	7 (in 7 cities)	Eden Gardens	
ICC Men's Cricket World Cup	2023 ICC Men's Cricket World Cup	Australia	241/4 (43 overs) – 240 (50 overs)	India	Runners-up	10 (in 10 cities)	Narendra Modi Stadium	
ICC Men's T20 World Cup	2026 ICC Men's T20 World Cup	India	255/5 (20 overs) – 159 (19 overs)	India	Champions	8 (in 8 cities)	Narendra Modi Stadium	
Women's senior competitions
ICC Women's Cricket World Cup	1978 Women's Cricket World Cup	Australia	100/2 (31.3 overs) – 96/8 (50 overs)	England	Group Stage	4 (in 4 cities)	Lal Bahadur Shastri Stadium, Hyderabad	
ICC Women's Cricket World Cup	1997 Women's Cricket World Cup	Australia	165/5 (47.4 overs) – 164 (49.3 overs)	New Zealand	Semi-finals	27 (in 21 cities)	Eden Gardens	
Women's Asia Cup	2006 Women's Asia Cup	India	95/2 (27.5 overs) – 93 (44.1 overs)	Sri Lanka	Champions	1 (in 1 city)	Sawai Mansingh Stadium	
ICC Women's Cricket World Cup	2013 Women's Cricket World Cup	Australia	259/7 (50 overs) – 145 (43.1 overs)	West Indies	Group Stage	5 (in 2 cities)	Brabourne Stadium	
ICC Women's T20 World Cup	2016 ICC Women's World Twenty20	West Indies	149/2 (19.3 overs) – 148/5 (20 overs)	Australia	Group Stage	8 (in 8 cities)	Eden Gardens	
ICC Women's Cricket World Cup	2025 Women's Cricket World Cup	India	298/7 (50 overs) – 246 (45.3 overs)	South Africa	Champions	5 (in 5 cities)	DY Patil Stadium	

== Performance in international competitions ==
A red box around the year indicates tournaments played within India

Key
Champions
Runners-up
Semi-finals

=== Men's team ===
==== World Test Championship ====
Season	League stage										Final			
Season	Standing	Matches					DED	PC	Points	PCT	Venue	Final	Position	Ref
Season	Standing	P	W	L	D	T	DED	PC	Points	PCT	Venue	Final	Position	Ref
2019–2021	1/9	17	12	4	1	0	0	720	520	72.2	Rose Bowl, England	Lost to New Zealand by 8 wickets	Runners-up	
2021–2023	2/9	18	10	5	3	0	5	216	127	58.80	The Oval, England	Lost to Australia by 209 runs	Runners-up	
2023–2025	3/9	19	9	8	2	0	2	228	114	50.00	Lord's, England	Did Not Qualify	Third Place	

==== Cricket World Cup ====
Year	Round	Position	P	W	L	T	NR	Squad	Ref
(England) 1975	Group Stage	6/8	3	1	2	0	0	Squad	
(England) 1979	Group Stage	7/8	3	0	3	0	0	Squad	
(England) (Wales) 1983	Champions	1/8	8	6	2	0	0	Squad	
(India) (Pakistan) 1987	Semi-finals	3/8	7	5	2	0	0	Squad	
(Australia) (New Zealand) 1992	Group Stage	7/9	8	2	5	0	1	Squad	
(India) (Pakistan) (Sri Lanka) 1996	Semi-finals	3/12	7	4	3	0	0	Squad	
(England) (Republic of Ireland) (Netherlands) (Scotland) (Wales) 1999	Super Six	6/12	8	4	4	0	0	Squad	
(South Africa) (Zimbabwe) (Kenya) 2003	Runners-up	2/14	11	9	2	0	0	Squad	
(Cricket West Indies) 2007	Group Stage	9/16	3	1	2	0	0	Squad	
(India) (Sri Lanka) (Bangladesh) 2011	Champions	1/14	9	7	1	1	0	Squad	
(Australia) (New Zealand) 2015	Semi-finals	3/14	8	7	1	0	0	Squad	
(England) (Wales) 2019	Semi-finals	3/10	10	7	2	0	1	Squad	
(India) 2023	Runners-up	2/10	11	10	1	0	0	Squad	
(South Africa) (Zimbabwe) (Namibia) 2027	TBD								
(India) (Bangladesh) 2031	Qualified as co-hosts								
Total	2 Titles	13/13	96	63	30	1	2		

==== T20 World Cup ====
Year	Round	Position	P	W	L	T	NR	Squad	Ref
(South Africa) 2007	Champions	1/12	7	4	1	1	1	Squad	
(England) 2009	Super 8s	7/12	5	2	3	0	0	Squad	
(Cricket West Indies) 2010	Super 8s	8/12	5	2	3	0	0	Squad	
(Sri Lanka) 2012	Super 8s	5/12	5	4	1	0	0	Squad	
(Bangladesh) 2014	Runners-up	2/16	6	5	1	0	0	Squad	
(India) 2016	Semi-finals	4/16	5	3	2	0	0	Squad	
(United Arab Emirates) (Oman) 2021	Super 12s	6/16	5	3	2	0	0	Squad	
(Australia) 2022	Semi-finals	3/16	6	4	2	0	0	Squad	
(Cricket West Indies) (United States) 2024	Champions	1/20	9	8	0	0	1	Squad	
(India) (Sri Lanka) 2026	Champions	1/20	9	8	1	0	0	Squad	
(Australia) (New Zealand) 2028	TBD								
(England) (Wales) (Scotland) (Republic of Ireland) 2030	TBD								
Total	3 Titles	10/10	62	43	16	1	2		

==== Olympic Games ====
Year	Round	Position	P	W	L	T	NR	Ref
(France) 1900	Did not participate							
(United States) 2028	TBA							
Total								

==== Champions Trophy ====
Year	Round	Position	P	W	L	T	NR	Squad	Ref
(Bangladesh) 1998	Semi Finals	3/9	2	1	1	0	0	Squad	
(Kenya) 2000	Runners-Up	2/11	4	3	1	0	0	Squad	
(Sri Lanka) 2002	Champions	1/12	5	3	0	0	2	Squad	
(England) 2004	Group Stage	7/12	2	1	1	0	0	Squad	
(India) 2006	Group Stage	5/10	3	1	2	0	0	Squad	
(South Africa) 2009	Group Stage	5/8	3	1	1	0	1	Squad	
(England) (Wales) 2013	Champions	1/8	5	5	0	0	0	Squad	
(England) (Wales) 2017	Runners-Up	2/8	5	3	2	0	0	Squad	
(Pakistan) (United Arab Emirates) 2025	Champions	1/8	5	5	0	0	0	Squad	
(India) 2029	Qualified as hosts								
Total	3 Titles	9/9	34	23	8	0	3		

==== Asia Cup ====
Year	Round	Position	P	W	L	T	NR	Ref
(United Arab Emirates) 1984	Champions	1/3	2	2	0	0	0	
(Sri Lanka) 1986	Boycotted the tournament							
(Bangladesh) 1988	Champions	1/4	4	3	1	0	0	
(India) 1990/91	Champions	1/3	4	3	1	0	0	
(United Arab Emirates) 1995	Champions	1/4	4	3	1	0	0	
(Sri Lanka) 1997	Runners-up	2/4	4	1	2	0	1	
(Bangladesh) 2000	First Round	3/4	3	1	2	0	0	
(Sri Lanka) 2004	Runners-up	2/6	6	3	3	0	0	
(Pakistan) 2008	Runners-up	2/6	6	4	2	0	0	
(Sri Lanka) 2010	Champions	1/4	4	3	1	0	0	
(Bangladesh) 2012	First Round	3/4	3	2	1	0	0	
(Bangladesh) 2014	First Round	3/5	4	2	2	0	0	
(Bangladesh) 2016	Champions	1/5	5	5	0	0	0	
(United Arab Emirates) 2018	Champions	1/6	6	5	0	1	0	
(United Arab Emirates) 2022	Super Fours	3/6	5	3	2	0	0	
(Pakistan) (Sri Lanka) 2023	Champions	1/6	6	4	1	0	1	
(United Arab Emirates) 2025	Champions	1/8	7	7	0	0	0	
(Bangladesh) 2027	TBD							
Total	9 Titles	16/17	72	50	19	1	2	

==== Asian Games ====
Year	Round	Position	P	W	L	T	NR	Ref
(China) 2010	Did not participate							
(South Korea) 2014	Did not participate							
(China) 2022	Gold	1/14	3	2	0	0	1	
(Japan) 2026	Gold	1/14	3	2	0	0	1	
Total	2 Title	2/4	6	4	0	0	2	

==== Commonwealth Games ====
Year	Round	Position	P	W	L	T	NR	Ref
(Malaysia) 1998	Group Stage	9/16	3	1	1	0	1	
2030								
Total	0 Title	1/1	3	1	1	0	1	

==== Defunct tournaments ====
Tournaments
Australian Tri-Series	Asian Test Championship	Austral-Asia Cup	NatWest Series	World Championship of Cricket	Nehru Cup	Hero Cup	Nidahas Trophy
(Australia) 1980–81: 3rd place; (Australia) 1985–86: Runners-up; (Australia) 1991–92: Runners-up; (Australia) 1999–2000: 3rd place; (Australia) 2003–04: Runners-up; (Australia) 2007–08: Champions; (Australia) 2011–12: 3rd place; (Australia) 2014–15: 3rd place	(India) (Pakistan) (Sri Lanka) 1999: Group stage	(United Arab Emirates) 1986: Runners-up; (United Arab Emirates) 1990: Group stage; (United Arab Emirates) 1994: Runners-up	(England) 2002: Champions	(Australia) 1985: Champions	(India) 1989: Semi-finalist	(India) 1993: Champions	(Sri Lanka) 1998: Champions; (Sri Lanka) 2018: Champions

=== Women's team ===
==== Women's Cricket World Cup ====
Year	Round	Position	Played	Won	Lost	Tie	NR
(England) 1973	Did not participate						
(India) 1978	Group Stage	4/4	3	0	3	0	0
(New Zealand) 1982	Group Stage	4/5	12	4	8	0	0
(Australia) 1988	Did not participate						
(England) 1993	Group Stage	4/8	7	4	3	0	0
(India) 1997	Semi-finals	4/11	6	3	1	1	1
(New Zealand) 2000	Semi-finals	3/8	8	5	3	0	0
(South Africa) 2005	Runners-up	2/8	9	5	2	0	2
(Australia) 2009	Super 6s	3/6	7	5	2	0	0
(India) 2013	Group Stage	7/8	4	2	2	0	0
(England) 2017	Runners-up	2/8	9	6	3	0	0
(New Zealand) 2022	Group Stage	5/8	7	3	4	0	0
(India) 2025	Champions	1/8	9	5	3	0	1
Total	10/12	1 titles	81	42	34	1	4

==== Women's T20 World Cup ====
Year	Position	Played	Won	Lost	Tie	NR
(England) 2009	Semi-finals	4	2	2	0	0
(Cricket West Indies) 2010	Semi-finals	4	2	2	0	0
(Sri Lanka) 2012	Group Stage	4	1	3	0	0
(Bangladesh) 2014	Group Stage	5	3	2	0	0
(India) 2016	Group Stage	4	1	3	0	0
(United Arab Emirates) 2018	Semi-finals	5	4	1	0	0
(Australia) 2020	Runners-up	6	4	1	0	1
(South Africa) 2023	Semi-finals	5	3	2	0	0
(United Arab Emirates) 2024	Group Stage	4	2	2	0	0
(England) 2026	Group Stage	5	3	2	0	0
Total	0 titles	46	25	20	0	1

==== Olympic Games ====
Year	Round	Position	P	W	L	T	NR	Ref
(United States) 2028								
Total								

==== ICC Women's Championship ====
Year	Round	Position	GP	W	L	D	T	NR
2014-16	Group Stage (Note: Advance To 2017 Women's Cricket World Cup Qualifier.)	5/8	21	9	11	0	0	1
2017-20	Group Stage (Note: Advance To 2022 Women's Cricket World Cup.)	4/8	21	10	8	0	0	3
2022-25	Group Stage (Note: Advance To 2025 Women's Cricket World Cup.)	2/10	24	18	6	0	0	0
Total	3/3	0 titles	66	37	25	0	0	4

==== Commonwealth Games ====
Year	Round	Position	GP	W	L	T	NR
(England) 2022	Silver medal	2/8	5	3	2	0	0
0 Title	1/1	5	3	2	0	0	0

==== Women's Asia Cup ====
Year	Round	Position	Played	Won	Lost	Tie	NR
(Sri Lanka) 2004	Champions	1/2	5	5	0	0	0
(Pakistan) 2005–06	Champions	1/3	5	5	0	0	0
(India) 2006	Champions	1/3	5	5	0	0	0
(Sri Lanka) 2008	Champions	1/4	7	7	0	0	0
(China) 2012	Champions	1/8	4	4	0	0	0
(Thailand) 2016	Champions	1/6	6	6	0	0	0
(Malaysia) 2018	Runners-up	2/6	6	4	2	0	0
(Bangladesh) 2022	Champions	1/7	8	7	1	0	0
(Sri Lanka) 2024	Runners-up	2/8	5	4	1	0	0
(United Arab Emirates) 2026	Champions	1/8	5	5	0	0	0
Total	8 titles	10/10	56	52	4	0	0

==== Asian Games ====
Year	Round	Position	GP	W	L	T	NR
(China) 2010	Did not participate						
(South Korea) 2014	Did not participate						
(China) 2022	Gold	1/9	3	2	0	0	1
(Japan) 2026	Gold	1/9	3	3	0	0	0
Total	2 Title	1/1	6	5	0	0	1

==== South Asian Games ====
Year	Round	Position	P	W	L	T	NR	Ref
(Bangladesh) 2016	Did not participate							
(Nepal) 2019	Did not participate							
(Pakistan) 2026	TBA							
Total	0 Titles	0/0	0	0	0	0	0	

=== Men's U-19 team ===
==== U19 Cricket World Cup ====
India U19 Cricket World Cup record
Year	Result	Pos	№	Pld	W	L	T	NR
(Australia) 1988	Group Stage	6th	8	7	3	4	0	0
(South Africa) 1998	Second Round	5th	16	6	4	2	0	0
(Sri Lanka) 2000	Champions	1st	16	8	7	0	1	0
(New Zealand) 2002	Semi-finals	3rd	16	7	4	3	0	0
(Bangladesh) 2004	Semi-finals	3rd	16	7	5	2	0	0
(Sri Lanka) 2006	Runners-up	2nd	16	6	5	1	0	0
(Malaysia) 2008	Champions	1st	16	6	6	0	0	0
(New Zealand) 2010	Quartar-finals	6th	16	6	3	3	0	0
(Australia) 2012	Champions	1st	16	6	5	1	0	0
(United Arab Emirates) 2014	Quarter-finals	5th	16	6	5	1	0	0
(Bangladesh) 2016	Runners-up	2nd	16	6	5	1	0	0
(New Zealand) 2018	Champions	1st	16	6	6	0	0	0
(South Africa) 2020	Runners-up	2nd	16	6	5	1	0	0
(Cricket West Indies) 2022	Champions	1st	16	6	6	0	0	0
(South Africa) 2024	Runners-up	2nd	16	7	6	1	0	0
(Zimbabwe) (Namibia) 2026	Champions	1st	16	7	7	0	0	0
Total	6 Titles			103	82	20	0	1

==== U19 Asia Cup ====
India U19 Asia Cup record
Year	Result	Pos	№	Pld	W	L	T	NR
(Bangladesh) 1989	Champions	1st	3	3	3	0	0	0
(Pakistan) 2003	Champions	1st	4	4	3	1	0	0
(Malaysia) 2012	Champions	1st	8	5	3	1	1	0
(United Arab Emirates) 2014	Champions	1st	8	5	4	1	0	0
(Sri Lanka) 2016	Champions	1st	8	5	5	0	0	0
(Malaysia) 2017	Group Stage	5th	8	3	1	2	0	0
(Bangladesh) 2018	Champions	1st	8	5	5	0	0	0
(Sri Lanka) 2019	Champions	1st	8	5	4	0	0	1
(United Arab Emirates) 2021	Champions	1st	8	5	4	1	0	0
(United Arab Emirates) 2023	Semi-finals	4th	8	4	2	2	0	0
(United Arab Emirates) 2024	Runners-up	2nd	8	5	3	2	0	0
(United Arab Emirates) 2025	Runners-up	2nd	8	5	4	1	0	0
(Oman) 2026	Champions	1st	8	5	4	1	0	0
Total	9 Titles			60	46	12	1	1

=== Women's U-19 team ===
==== U19 Women's T20 World Cup ====
India U19 T20 World Cup record
Year	Result	Pos	№	Pld	W	L	T	NR
(South Africa) 2023	Champions	1st	16	7	6	1	0	0
(Malaysia) 2025	Champions	1st	16	7	7	0	0	0
Total	2 Titles			14	13	1	0	0

==== U19 Women's T20 Asia Cup ====
India U19 T20 Asia Cup record
Year	Result	Pos	№	Pld	W	L	T	NR
(Malaysia) 2024	Champions	1st	6	5	4	0	0	1
Total	1 Title		6	5	4	0	0	1

=== Men's A team ===
==== Asia Cup Rising Stars ====
Asia Cup Rising Stars record
Year	Round	Position	P	W	L	T	NR
(Singapore) 2013	Champions	1/8	5	4	1	0	0
(Bangladesh) 2017	Group Stage	5/8	3	2	1	0	0
(Sri Lanka) (Pakistan) 2018	Runners-up	2/8	5	4	1	0	0
(Bangladesh) 2019	Semi-finals	4/8	4	2	2	0	0
(Sri Lanka) 2023	Runners-up	2/8	5	4	1	0	0
(Oman) 2024	Semi-finals	3/8	4	3	1	0	0
(Qatar) 2025	Semi-finals	3/8	4	2	2	0	0
Total	1 Title	-	30	21	9	0	0

=== Women's A team ===
==== Women's Asia Cup Rising Stars ====
Women's Asia Cup Rising Stars record
Year	Round	Position	P	W	L	T	NR
(Hong Kong) 2023	Champions	1/8	5	2	0	0	3
(Thailand) 2026	Champions	1/8	5	4	1	0	0
Total	2 Titles	-	10	6	1	0	3

== Cricket broadcast in India ==
=== Domestic competitions ===
==== Domestic franchise cricket ====
List of current broadcasters:

Competition	Period	Television Rights		Streaming Rights	
Competition	Period	Conglomerate	Network	Conglomerate	Platform
Indian Premier League	2023–2027	JioStar	Star Sports	JioStar	JioHotstar
Women's Premier League	2023–2027	JioStar	Star Sports	JioStar	JioHotstar

==== Domestic State/Zonal cricket ====
List of current broadcasters:

Competition		Period	Television Rights		Streaming Rights	
Competition		Period	Conglomerate	Network	Conglomerate	Platform
First Class Cricket	Ranji Trophy	2023–2028	JioStar	Star Sports	JioStar	JioHotstar
First Class Cricket	Irani Cup	2023–2028	JioStar	Star Sports	JioStar	JioHotstar
First Class Cricket	Duleep Trophy	2023–2028	JioStar	Star Sports	JioStar	JioHotstar
First Class Cricket	Senior Women's Inter Zonal Multi-Day Trophy	2023–2028	JioStar	Star Sports	JioStar	JioHotstar
List A Cricket	Vijay Hazare Trophy	2023–2028	JioStar	Star Sports	JioStar	JioHotstar
List A Cricket	Deodhar Trophy	2023–2028	JioStar	Star Sports	JioStar	JioHotstar
List A Cricket	Senior Women's One-Day Trophy	2023–2028	JioStar	Star Sports	JioStar	JioHotstar
List A Cricket	Senior Women's Inter Zonal One-Day Trophy	2023–2028	JioStar	Star Sports	JioStar	JioHotstar
T20 Cricket	Syed Mushtaq Ali Trophy	2023–2028	JioStar	Star Sports	JioStar	JioHotstar
T20 Cricket	Senior Women's T20 Trophy	2023–2028	JioStar	Star Sports	JioStar	JioHotstar
T20 Cricket	Senior Women's Inter Zonal T20 Trophy	2023–2028	JioStar	Star Sports	JioStar	JioHotstar

==== Domestic State franchise cricket ====
List of current broadcasters:

State	Competition	Period	Television Rights		Streaming Rights	
State	Competition	Period	Conglomerate	Network	Conglomerate	Platform
Bihar	Bihar Cricket League	2021	WBD India	Eurosport India	WBD India	Discovery+
Maharashtra (excluding Mumbai and Vidarbha)	Maharashtra Premier League	2025	JioStar	Star Sports	JioStar	JioHotstar
Maharashtra (excluding Mumbai and Vidarbha)	Women's Maharashtra Premier League	2025	JioStar	Star Sports	JioStar	JioHotstar
Mumbai (Note: It is not a state, but there is separate association for administrating cricket in Mumbai, Thane and Navi Mumbai of Maharashtra .)	T20 Mumbai	2025	JioStar	Star Sports	JioStar	JioHotstar
Andhra Pradesh	Andhra Premier League	2024	JioStar	Star Sports	Dream Sports	FanCode
Vadodara (Note: It is not a state, but there is separate association for administrating cricket in Vadodara of Gujarat.)	Baroda Premier League	2025	JioStar	Star Sports	Dream Sports	FanCode
Kerala	Kerala Cricket League	2024-2030	JioStar	Star Sports, Asianet Plus	Dream Sports	FanCode
Karnataka	Maharaja Trophy KSCA T20	2025	JioStar	Star Sports	Dream Sports	FanCode
Puducherry	Pondicherry Premier League	2025	JioStar	Star Sports	Dream Sports	FanCode
Punjab	Sher-E-Punjab T20 Cup	2024	JioStar	Star Sports	Dream Sports	FanCode
Tamil Nadu	Tamil Nadu Premier League	2025	JioStar	Star Sports	Dream Sports	FanCode
Rajasthan	Rajasthan Premier League	2023	WBD India	Eurosport India	JioStar	JioHotstar
West Bengal	Bengal Pro T20 League	2025	JioStar	Star Sports	JioStar	JioHotstar
West Bengal	Women's Bengal Pro T20 League	2025	JioStar	Star Sports	JioStar	JioHotstar
Delhi	Delhi Premier League T20	2025	None	None	Dream Sports	FanCode
Delhi	Women's Delhi Premier League T20	2025	None	None		
Madhya Pradesh	Madhya Pradesh League	2025	JioStar	Star Sports	Dream Sports	FanCode
Madhya Pradesh	Women's Madhya Pradesh League	2025	JioStar	Star Sports	Dream Sports	FanCode
Uttar Pradesh	UP T20 League	2024	JioStar	Star Sports	JioStar	JioHotstar
Saurashtra (Note: It is not a state, but there is separate association for administrating cricket in Saurashtra of Gujarat.)	Saurashtra Pro T20 League	2025	Doordarshan	DD Sports	JioStar, Dream11	JioHotstar, Fancode, Waves
Vidarbha (Note: It is not a state, but there is separate association for administrating cricket in Vidarbha of Maharashtra.)	Vidarbha Pro T20 League	2025	Doordarshan	DD Sports	JioStar, Dream11	JioHotstar, Fancode, Waves
Vidarbha	Vidarbha Pro T20 League	2025	Doordarshan	DD Sports	JioStar, Dream11	JioHotstar, Fancode, Waves
Chhattisgarh	Chhattisgarh Cricket Premier League	2025	Culver Max Entertainment	Sony Sports Network	Culver Max Entertainment	SonyLIV
Uttarakhand	Uttarakhand Premier League	2024	Culver Max Entertainment	Sony Sports Network	Dream11	FanCode
Uttarakhand	Uttarakhand Premier League	2024	Culver Max Entertainment	Sony Sports Network	Dream11	FanCode
Arunachal Pradesh	Arunachal Premier League	2024	None		Dream11	FanCode
Odisha	Odisha Cricket League	2023	None		Dream11	FanCode

=== International competitions ===
==== International Cricket (Home) ====
List of current broadcasters:

Competition	Period	Television Rights		Streaming Rights	
Competition	Period	Conglomerate	Network	Conglomerate	Platform
International Cricket In India	2023–2028	JioStar	Star Sports DD Sports (FTA)	JioStar	JioHotstar

==== International Cricket (Away) ====
List of current broadcasters:

Competition	Period	Television Rights		Streaming Rights	
Competition	Period	Conglomerate	Network	Conglomerate	Platform
International Cricket Council	2024–2027	JioStar	Star Sports DD Sports (FTA) (All TEST, ODI and T20I matches of India including Semi-Finals and Final)	JioStar	JioHotstar
International Cricket in South Africa	2024–2031	JioStar	Star Sports DD Sports (FTA) (All TEST, ODI and T20I matches of India including Semi-Finals and Final)	JioStar	JioHotstar
International Cricket in Australia	2023-2030	JioStar	Star Sports DD Sports (FTA) (All TEST, ODI and T20I matches of India including Semi-Finals and Final)	JioStar	JioHotstar
Asian Cricket Council	2024-2031	Culver Max Entertainment	Sony Sports Network DD Sports (FTA) (Only Test, ODIs and T20Is against India)	Culver Max Entertainment	SonyLIV
International Cricket in England	2022–2028	Culver Max Entertainment	Sony Sports Network DD Sports (FTA) (Only Test, ODIs and T20Is against India)	Culver Max Entertainment	SonyLIV
International Cricket in Sri Lanka	2023–2027	Culver Max Entertainment	Sony Sports Network DD Sports (FTA) (Only Test, ODIs and T20Is against India)	Culver Max Entertainment	SonyLIV
International Cricket in New Zealand	2024-2031	Culver Max Entertainment	Sony Sports Network DD Sports (FTA) (Only Test, ODIs and T20Is against India)	Culver Max Entertainment	SonyLIV
International Cricket in New Zealand	2024-2026	Culver Max Entertainment	Sony Sports Network DD Sports (FTA) (Only Test, ODIs and T20Is against India)	Amazon	Amazon Prime Video
International Cricket in Pakistan	2025	Culver Max Entertainment	Sony Sports Network DD Sports (FTA) (Only Test, ODIs and T20Is against India)	Dream11	FanCode
International Cricket in Zimbabwe	2024	Prasar Bharati	DD Sports (FTA) (Only Test, ODIs and T20Is against India)	Dream11	FanCode
International Cricket in West Indies	2021-2024	Prasar Bharati	DD Sports (FTA) (Only Test, ODIs and T20Is against India)	Dream11	FanCode
International Cricket in Bangladesh	2025	Prasar Bharati	DD Sports (FTA) (Only Test, ODIs and T20Is against India)	Dream11	FanCode
International Cricket in Afghanistan	2024-2027	WBD India	Eurosport India	WBD India	Discovery+

==== International franchise cricket ====
List of current broadcasters:

Country (or) Confederation	Competition	Period	Television Rights		Streaming Rights	
Country (or) Confederation	Competition	Period	Conglomerate	Network	Conglomerate	Platform
Afghanistan	Afghanistan Premier League	2024-2027	WBD India	Eurosport India	WBD India	Discovery+
Australia	Big Bash League	2023–2030	JioStar	Star Sports	JioStar	JioHotstar
Australia	Women's Big Bash League	2023–2030	JioStar	Star Sports	JioStar	JioHotstar
Bangladesh	Bangladesh Premier League	2024-25	None		Dream11	Fancode
Canada	Global T20 Canada	2024	JioStar	Star Sports	Dream11	Fancode
England	The Hundred	2025	Culver Max Entertainment	Sony Sports Network	Dream11	Fancode
England	The Women's Hundred	2025	Culver Max Entertainment	Sony Sports Network	Dream11	Fancode
Nepal	Nepal Premier League	2024	JioStar	Star Sports	Dream11	Fancode
Pakistan	Pakistan Super League	2025	Culver Max Entertainment	Sony Sports Network	Dream11	Fancode
South Africa	SA20	2023–2033	JioStar	Star Sports	JioStar	JioHotstar
Sri Lanka	Lanka Premier League	2024	JioStar	Star Sports	Dream11	FanCode
Sri Lanka	Lanka T10	2024	JioStar	Star Sports	Dream11	FanCode
United Arab Emirates	Abu Dhabi T10	2024	JioStar	Star Sports	Dream11	FanCode
United Arab Emirates	International League T20	2023–2032	Zee Entertainment Enterprises	Zee Network	Zee Entertainment Enterprises	ZEE5
United States	Major League Cricket	2025	JioStar	Star Sports	JioStar	JioHotstar
United States	US Masters T10	2024	JioStar	Star Sports	Dream11	FanCode
West Indies	Caribbean Premier League	2024	JioStar	Star Sports	Dream11	FanCode
West Indies	Women's Caribbean Premier League	2024	JioStar	Star Sports	Dream11	FanCode
West Indies	Global Super League	2025	Culver Max Entertainment	Sony Sports Network	Dream11	FanCode
Zimbabwe	Zim Afro T10	2024	JioStar	Star Sports	Dream11	FanCode

=== Other competition ===
List of current broadcasters:

Competition	Period	Television Rights		Streaming Rights	
Competition	Period	Conglomerate	Network	Conglomerate	Platform
World Championship of Legends	2025	JioStar	Star Sports	Dream Sports	FanCode
Celebrity Cricket League	2025	Culver Max Entertainment	Sony Sports Network	JioStar	JioHotstar
International Masters League	2025	JioStar	Colors Cineplex, Colors Cineplex Superhits	JioStar	JioHotstar
Legends League Cricket (T20)	2023-25	JioStar	Star Sports	Dream Sports	FanCode
Asian Legends League	2025	Culver Max Entertainment	Sony Sports Network	Dream Sports	FanCode
Legends League Cricket (T10)	2025	Doordarshan	DD Sports	Prasar Bharati	Waves
Indian Street Premier League	2025	JioStar	Star Sports	JioStar	JioHotstar
Max60 Caribbean	2025	Culver Max Entertainment	Sony Sports Network	Dream Sports	FanCode

== In popular culture ==
Cricket is portrayed in Indian popular culture as an extremely important part of India's national identity. It is frequently associated with a strong sense of patriotism and nationalism.

=== Films ===
Cricket has been portrayed many times in various Indian films. One such popular film is M.S. Dhoni: The Untold Story, a film produced by Arun Pandey and Fox Star Studios and directed by Neeraj Pandey.It stars late actor Sushant Singh Rajput as India national team captain Mahendra Singh Dhoni, known as one India's greatest Captain, Finisher ever in cricketing history. The film is of the biographical sports drama and covers some parts of life of the great Mahendra Singh Dhoni such as childhood, family relationships, struggles, marriage, captaincy of India national cricket team and making India win the most icon 2011 Cricket World Cup by hitting a six.M.S. Dhoni: The Untold Story was received very well by audiences and critics alike, scoring 80% on Rotten Tomatoes and 8 on IMDb.

83 is also a film produced by Reliance Entertainment and directed by Kabir Khan. It stars actor Ranveer Singh as India national team captain Kapil Dev, known as one of India's greatest bowlers in cricketing history. The film is of the historical genre of Indian films and covers the Indian national team's underdog victory in the 1983 Cricket World Cup. 83 was received well by audiences and critics alike, scoring 80% on Rotten Tomatoes and 7.5 on IMDb. Many reviews appreciated the film's emphasis on national pride and dramatic storytelling of India's famous victory in 1983, although some criticized the film for unnecessarily over-dramatizing parts of the story.

=== Celebrities ===
Indian national cricket players are viewed as some of the highest-profile celebrities in India, especially Sachin Tendulkar, who some attribute god-like status to. Towards the end of his sporting career, Tendulkar began to pursue a political career, being sworn in as an MP to Rajya Sabha, India's upper house of Parliament in 2012, one year before retiring officially in 2013. While Tendulkar has not officially associated himself with any political party, various literature have claimed that he started to become a Hindu-centric role model after the turn of the 21st century during his cricketing career.

== Clubs on social media ==
The five most popular cricket clubs on social media in the world are all Indian Premier League clubs as of 2024:

#	Cricket club	Location	Followers
1	Chennai Super Kings	Chennai	40.5 million
2	Mumbai Indians	Mumbai	36.3 million
3	Royal Challengers Bengaluru	Bengaluru	31.9 million
4	Kolkata Knight Riders	Kolkata	28.9 million
5	Sunrisers Hyderabad	Hyderabad	14.2 million

== See also ==
- Sport in India
- Cricket in South Asia
- List of cricket records
- List of India national cricket captains
- List of India Test cricketers
- List of India ODI cricketers
- List of India Twenty20 International cricketers
- List of National Sports Award recipients in cricket
- India national blind cricket team
- India national deaf cricket team
