= Rajasthan Premier League =

T20 cricket league played in Rajasthan, India

- Official logo of the RPL
- Countries: India
- Administrator: Rajasthan Cricket Association
- Format: Twenty20
- First edition: 2023
- Next edition: 2024
- Tournament format: Round Robin and knockout
- Number of teams: 6
- Current champion: Jaipur Indians
- Most successful: Jaipur Indians (1 title)
- Most runs: Abhijeet Tomar (397)
- Most wickets: Vishal Godara (12)
- TV: JioCinema

Rajasthan Premier League (RPL) is a men's Twenty20 (T20) cricket league that is annually held in the state of Rajasthan, India. It is contested by six city-based franchise teams. The league is formed in 2023 by the Rajasthan Cricket Association. It is usually played from August to September.

== Teams ==
Six franchises are competing in the league.

Team locations

Team	City	Owner(s)	Captain
Bhilwara Bulls	Bhilwara		Deepak Chahar
Jodhpur Sunrisers	Jodhpur		Abhijeet Tomar
Jaipur Indians	Jaipur		Shubham Garhwal
Jaanbaaz Kota Challengers	Kota		Deepak Hooda
Shekhawati Soldiers Sikar	Sikar		Mahipal Lomror
Udaipur Lakecity Warriors	Udaipur		Khaleel Ahmed

== Venues ==
Rajasthan
Jodhpur	Jaipur
Barkatullah Khan Stadium	Sawai Mansingh Stadium
Coordinates: 26°16′24″N 73°0′4″E	Coordinates: 26°53′38.51″N 75°48′11.61″E
Capacity: 30,000	Capacity: 30,000
Rajasthan Premier League is located in Rajasthan

== Tournament season and results ==
Season	Final				Player of the series
Season	Venue	Winners	Result	Runners-up	Player of the series
2023	Sawai Mansingh Stadium, Jaipur	Jaipur Indians 171/5 (19.5 overs)	Jaipur Indians won by 5 wickets Scorecard	Jodhpur Sunrisers 168/10 (20 overs)	Shubham Garhwal

== Team's performance ==
Season Franchise	2023	2024
Bhilwara Bulls	5th	
Jodhpur Sunrisers	RU	
Jaipur Indians	C	
Jaanbaaz Kota Challengers	SF	
Shekhawati Soldiers Sikar	6th	
Udaipur Lakecity Warriors	SF	

- Teams are listed alphabetically by year of entry into the league
- C: champions
- RU: runner-up
- SF or PO: team qualified for the semi-final or playoff stage of the competition

== See also ==
- Andhra Premier League
- Bengal Pro T20 League
- Bihar Cricket League
- Delhi Premier League T20
- Madhya Pradesh League
- Maharaja Trophy KSCA T20
- Odisha Cricket League
- Saurashtra Premier League
- Sher-E-Punjab T20 Cup
- Tamil Nadu Premier League
- T20 Mumbai
