= 2025–26 Senior Women's Inter Zonal T20 Trophy =

Domestic cricket competition

2023–24 Women's Senior Inter Zonal T20
- Dates: 4 November – 14 November 2025
- Administrator: BCCI
- Cricket format: Twenty20
- Tournament format(s): Round-robin tournament and final
- Host: India
- Participants: 5
- Matches: 16
- Official website: bcci.tv

The 2025–26 Senior Women's Inter Zonal T20 Trophy will be the 3rd edition of the Senior Women's Inter Zonal T20 Trophy, a domestic women's T20 competition in India. The tournament will take place from 4 November to 14 November 2025, with six zonal teams taking part. East Zone were the defending champions.

== Competition format ==
Six teams competed in the tournament, representing regions of India. Each team played each other once in a round-robin format. The top two teams in the group progressed to the final. Matches were played using a Twenty20 format.

The groups worked on a points system with positions within the groups being based on the total points. Points were awarded as follows:

Win: 4 points.
Tie: 2 points.
Loss: 0 points.
No Result/Abandoned: 2 points.

If points in the final table were equal, teams were separated by most wins, then head-to-head record, then Net Run Rate.
