= 2026–27 Senior Women's Inter Zonal T20 Trophy =

Domestic cricket competition

2026–27 Women's Senior Inter Zonal T20 Trophy
- Dates: 24 November – 4 December 2026
- Administrator: BCCI
- Cricket format: Twenty20
- Tournament format(s): Round-robin tournament and final
- Host: India
- Participants: 5
- Matches: 16
- Official website: bcci.tv

The 2026–27 Senior Women's Inter Zonal T20 Trophy will be the 4th edition of the Senior Women's Inter Zonal T20 Trophy, a domestic women's T20 competition in India. The tournament will take place from 24 November to 4 December 2026 with six zonal teams taking part. The tournament formed part of the 2026–27 Indian domestic cricket season, announced by the Board of Control for Cricket in India (BCCI) in June 2026. West Zone were the defending champions.

== Competition format ==
Six teams competed in the tournament, representing regions of India. Each team played each other once in a round-robin format. The top two teams in the group progressed to the final. Matches were played using a Twenty20 format.

The groups worked on a points system with positions within the groups being based on the total points. Points were awarded as follows:

Win: 4 points.
Tie: 2 points.
Loss: 0 points.
No Result/Abandoned: 2 points.

If points in the final table were equal, teams were separated by most wins, then head-to-head record, then Net Run Rate.
