= Servotech =

Indian renewable energy company

Servotech Renewable Power System Limited
- Company type: Public
- Traded as: NSE: SERVOTECH
- ISIN: INE782X01033
- Industry: Renewable energy
- Founded: 2004; 22 years ago
- Founder: Raman Bhatia
- Headquarters: New Delhi,, India
- Area served: India
- Products: Electric vehicle charging infrastructure; Medical devices; Rechargeable battery; Solar energy; Wind energy
- Subsidiaries: Rebreathe Medical Devices India Private Ltd.; Servotech EV Infra Private Ltd.; Servotech Sports & Entertainment Private Ltd.; Techbec Industries Ltd.
- Website: servotech.in

Servotech (also known as Servotech Renewable Power Systems Limited) is an Indian renewable energy company, headquartered in New Delhi, India.

== History ==
The company, established in 2004 as Servotech Power Systems Limited, manufactures solar-related products and has expanded its operations into the development of AC-DC chargers for electric vehicles. It is also involved in the production of ultra-fast DC chargers and home AC chargers. Initially, the company began its business with the introduction of sine wave inverters for both commercial and domestic applications. In addition to its core solar offerings, the company is into manufacturing of LED lights, solar streetlights, and solar-hybrid inverters. In 2017, the company went public, listing on the National Stock Exchange of India's SME platform on August 24 and in 2021 it migrated to NSE mainboard. And, in December 2024, it rebranded itself to Servotech Renewable Power Systems Limited in December 2024.

In May 2025, Errol Musk joined the company as a member of global advisory board of the company.

== Operations ==
Servotech has a manufacturing capacity of 300,000 units per month at its facility in Sonipat, Haryana. As of March 2024, company building a new manufacturing plant dedicated to producing Power Modules, Control Circuits, and PLCs — key components used in EV chargers. Initially, this new facility will have the capacity to produce 24,000 power modules per year, with plans to scale up production to 240,000 power modules annually.

=== Project EnerMAAS ===
The EnerMAAS project, funded by the German Federal Ministry for Economic Affairs and Climate Action, will run for 2.7 years. To support this initiative, Servotech has partnered with LESSzwei GmbH to develop fully solar-powered EV charging infrastructure for micromobility in Germany. The project will introduce AI-driven BIKE-Port charging stations, each capable of charging four two-wheelers with a total solar-powered output of 3.3 kW. Servotech will manufacture 100 units, deploying two stations in 50 cities, while LESSzwei will develop the AI and application components.

== Sports ==
The company owns the Servotech Siliguri Strikers team in the Bengal Pro T20 League.
