= Senior Women's Inter Zonal T20 Trophy =

Women's Twenty20 cricket tournament in India

- Countries: India
- Administrator: BCCI
- Format: Twenty20
- First edition: 2022–23
- Latest edition: 2025–26
- Next edition: 2026–27
- Tournament format: Round-robin and knockout
- Number of teams: 6
- Current champion: West Zone (1st title)
- Most successful: East Zone; Central Zone (1 titles)
- Website: www.bcci.tv
- 2026–27

The Senior Women's Inter Zonal T20 Trophy is a women's Twenty20 cricket competition in India. organised by the Board of Control for Cricket in India. The competition began in 2022–23.

== Competition format ==
Six teams competed in the tournament, representing regions of India. Each team played each other once in a round-robin format. The top two teams in the group progressed to the final. Matches were played using a Twenty20 format.

The group worked on a points system with positions within the group being based on the total points. Points were awarded as follows:

Win: 4 points.
Tie: 2 points.
Loss: 0 points.
No Result/Abandoned: 2 points.

If points in the final table were equal, teams were separated by most wins, then head-to-head record, then Net Run Rate.

== Teams ==
Team	Wins	Runners-up
Central Zone	1	0
East Zone	1	
North Zone	0	0
South Zone	0	
West Zone	0	
North East Zone

== Tournament results ==
Season	Winner	Runner up	Refs
2022–23	Central Zone	West Zone	
2023–24	East Zone	West Zone	
2025–26	West Zone	North Zone	
2026–27
