= Mukesh Kumar (cricketer) =

Indian cricketer (born 1993)

Personal information
- Born: 12 October 1993 (age 33); Gopalganj, Bihar, India
- Height: 1.82 m (6 ft 0 in)
- Batting: Right-handed
- Bowling: Right-arm medium
- Role: Bowler

International information
- National side: India (2023–present)
- Test debut (cap 308): 20 July 2023 v West Indies
- Last Test: 2 February 2024 v England
- ODI debut (cap 251): 27 July 2023 v West Indies
- Last ODI: 21 December 2023 v South Africa
- ODI shirt no.: 49
- T20I debut (cap 103): 3 August 2023 v West Indies
- Last T20I: 14 July 2024 v Zimbabwe
- T20I shirt no.: 49

Domestic team information
- Years: Team
- 2013-present: Mohun Bagan
- 2015–Present: Bengal
- 2023–Present: Delhi Capitals
- 2024-present: Sobisco Smashers Malda
- 2026: Nottinghamshire

Career statistics
Competition	Test	ODI	T20I	FC
Matches	3	6	17	61
Runs scored	0	10	5	285
Batting average	–	10.00	5.00	8.14
100s/50s	0/0	0/0	0/0	0/0
Top score	0*	6	4*	28
Balls bowled	284	234	324	10,506
Wickets	7	5	20	234
Bowling average	25.57	43.40	24.35	22.07
5 wickets in innings	0	0	0	10
10 wickets in match	0	0	0	1
Best bowling	2/0	3/30	4/22	6/32
Catches/stumpings	0/–	1/–	2/–	7/–
Medal record
Men's Cricket
Representing India
Asian Games
Gold medal – first place	2022 Hangzhou	Team
- Source: ESPNcricinfo, 26 September 2026

Mukesh Kumar (Hindi: [mʊkeːʃ kʊmaːɾ]; born 12 October 1993) is an Indian international cricketer. Mukesh plays as right fast bowler for the India national cricket team in international cricket, for the Delhi Capitals in the Indian Premier League and for Bengal in domestic cricket and for Mohun Bagan in CAB first division and for Sobisco Smashers Malda in Bengal Pro T20 League. He made his Test debut in July 2023, playing for India against West Indies.

== Early life ==
Mukesh Kumar was born on 12 October 1993 and originally hails from Kakarkund in Gopalganj district, Bihar. In 2012, he moved to Kolkata at the insistence of his father who ran a taxi business there.

== Career ==
He made his first-class debut on 30 October in the 2015–16 Ranji Trophy. He made his List A debut on 13 December 2015 in the 2015–16 Vijay Hazare Trophy. He made his Twenty20 debut on 6 January 2016 in the 2015–16 Syed Mushtaq Ali Trophy.

== International career ==
He got his maiden call-up for Indian cricket team in September 2022 for the ODI series against South Africa. In December 2022, he was picked in the Indian cricket team for their Twenty20 International (T20I) series against Sri Lanka. In June 2023, he was named in the Indian squad for all three formats for the tour of West Indies. He made his debut in the second Test of the series on 20 July 2023 at Queen's Park Oval, Port of Spain, Trinidad. There, he took his maiden Test wicket – that of Kirk McKenzie – finishing with figures of 2/48 from 18 overs in the first innings and 0/5 from 5 overs in the second innings of the Test match.

He made his ODI debut in the first match of the series against West Indies on 27 July 2023 at Kensington Oval, Bridgetown, Barbados. There, he took his maiden ODI wicket – that of Alick Athanaze – finishing with figures of 1/22 from 5 overs.

He made his T20I debut in the first match of the series against the West Indies on 3 August 2023 at the Brian Lara Stadium, Tarouba, Trinidad and Tobago.

== Personal life ==
In 2023, Mukesh Kumar married Chhapra-based Divya Singh in Gorakhpur.

== See also ==
- List of Bengal cricketers
- Gopalganj
