= 2010 Asia Cup final =

2010 Asia Cup Final
- Event: 2010 Asia Cup
India	Sri Lanka
(India)	(Sri Lanka)
268/6	187
(50 overs)	(44.4 overs)
- India won by 81 runs
- Date: 24 June 2010
- Venue: Rangiri Dambulla International Stadium, Dambulla
- Player of the match: Dinesh Karthik (Ind)
- Umpires: Billy Bowden (NZ) and Billy Doctrove (WI)

The 2010 Asia Cup (also known as Micromax Asia Cup) was the tenth edition of the Asia Cup cricket tournament, which was held in Sri Lanka from 15–24 June 2010. Only the test playing nations India, Pakistan, Sri Lanka and Bangladesh were taking part in the competition. India defeated Sri Lanka by 81 runs in the final to win a record 5th Asia Cup title.

The final match was played on 24 June 2010 at the Rangiri Dambulla International Stadium, Dambulla, which was played between India and Sri Lanka to determine the winner of the 2010 season of the Asia Cup.

Winning the toss, India elected to bat. India set up a total of 268/6 off 50 overs for their opposition. Sri Lanka chased the total unsuccessfully.

== Match Details and Officials ==
- On-field umpires: Billy Bowden (NZ) and Billy Doctrove (WI)
- TV Umpire: Ahsan Raza (Pak)
- Reserve umpire: SH Sarathkumara (SL)
- Match referee: Andy Pycroft (Zim)
- Toss: India won the toss and elected to bat
- Result: India won by 81 runs
- League impact: India won the 2010 Asia Cup

== Background ==
Points Table
Team	P	W	L	T	NR	NRR	BP	Points
Sri Lanka	3	3	0	0	0	+1.424	2	14
India	3	2	1	0	0	+0.275	1	9
Pakistan	3	1	2	0	0	+0.788	1	5
Bangladesh	3	0	3	0	0	−2.627	0	0
Source:ESPNCricinfo

== Final Match ==
=== India innings ===
The final of the 2010 Asia Cup was played on 24 June 2010 in Dambulla between India and Sri Lanka. Indian captain MS Dhoni won the toss and elected to bat first. Gautam Gambhir and Dinesh Karthik gave India a promising start but Gambhir was soon dismissed at 30 with India rollicking at 38/1 off 6.1 overs. Then Virat Kohli and Karthik put up a partnership of 62 runs after which Kohli was caught by Kumar Sangakkara behind the wickets. The highest scorer for the Indian team was Karthik (66 off 84) followed by Rohit Sharma (41) and MS Dhoni (38). India managed to score 268/6 in their 50 overs with Sri Lanka needing 269 runs to win the championship.

=== Sri Lanka innings ===
The Sri Lankan batting started off to a slow start with Tillakaratne Dilshan caught in the first over. First five wickets fell off in quick succession within the score of 50 runs. Upul Tharanga, Mahela Jayawardene, Angelo Mathews and Kumar Sangakkara followed Dilshan soon after. After this, a promising partnership developed between Thilina Kandamby and Chamara Kapugedera (55 runs) which seemed to bring back Sri Lankan hopes in the match. But after the fall of this partnership, Sri Lanka never managed to recover and were all out for a score of 187 in 44.4 overs. India won the match by 81 runs, and with it, the Asia Cup after 15 years.

=== Summary ===
Thilina Kandamby (2/37 in 7 overs) was the best in the bowling department for Sri Lanka, followed by Lasith Malinga who also took 2 wickets giving 57 runs in 10 overs.

The Indian bowling attack was spearheaded by Ashish Nehra who took 4 wickets in 9 overs, followed by Ravindra Jadeja (2 wickets), Praveen Kumar (2 wickets) and Zaheer Khan (2 wickets).

Dinesh Karthik was declared the Man of the Match for his match winning innings of 66 off 84 balls while Pakistan's Shahid Afridi was declared Man of the Series for scoring 265 runs in 3 matches during the tournament.

24 June
14:30 (D/N)
Scorecard

India; 268/6 (50 overs)	v	Sri Lanka; 187 (44.4 overs)
Dinesh Karthik 66 (84); Thilina Kandamby 2/37 (7 overs)		Chamara Kapugedera 55* (88); Ashish Nehra 4/40 (9 overs)

India won by 81 runs
Rangiri Dambulla International Stadium, Dambulla
Umpires: Billy Bowden (NZ) and Billy Doctrove (WI)
Player of the match: Dinesh Karthik (Ind)

- India won the toss and elected to bat.

== Scorecard ==
Source :

Scorecard on ESPNcricinfo

India batting
Player	Status	Runs	Balls	4s	6s	Strike rate
Gautam Gambhir	run out (Tharanga/Kulasekara)	15	16	2	0	93.75
Dinesh Karthik	c Jayawardene b Kandamby	66	84	9	0	78.57
Virat Kohli	c †Sangakkara b Malinga	28	34	4	0	82.35
MS Dhoni *†	c Kulasekara b Kandamby	38	50	2	1	76.00
Rohit Sharma	c Maharoof b Kulasekara	41	52	3	0	78.84
Suresh Raina	lbw b Malinga	29	31	3	0	93.54
Ravindra Jadeja	not out	25	27	1	0	92.59
Harbhajan Singh	not out	7	7	0	0	100.00
Praveen Kumar	did not bat					
Zaheer Khan	did not bat					
Ashish Nehra	did not bat					
Extras	(b 2, lb 7, nb 1, w 9)	19				
Total	(6 wickets; 50 overs)	268		24	1	

Fall of wickets: 1/38 (Gambhir, 6.1 ov), 2/100 (Kohli, 18.2 ov), 3/146 (Karthik, 28.1 ov), 4/167 (Dhoni, 32.2 ov), 5/217 (Raina, 40.6 ov), 6/249 (Rohit, 47.2 ov)

Sri Lanka bowling
Bowler	Overs	Maidens	Runs	Wickets	Econ	Wides	NBs
Nuwan Kulasekara	9	0	44	1	4.88	2	0
Lasith Malinga	10	0	57	2	5.70	6	1
Farveez Maharoof	6	0	41	0	6.83	0	0
Angelo Mathews	3	1	16	0	5.33	0	0
Muttiah Muralitharan	10	0	34	0	3.40	0	0
Thilina Kandamby	7	0	37	2	5.28	0	0
Tillakaratne Dilshan	5	0	30	0	6.00	1	0

Sri Lanka batting
Player	Status	Runs	Balls	4s	6s	Strike rate
Upul Tharanga	b Khan	16	30	1	0	53.33
Tillakaratne Dilshan	c Harbhajan b Kumar	0	2	0	0	0.00
Kumar Sangakkara *†	c Khan b Nehra	17	38	2	0	44.73
Mahela Jayawardene	c †Dhoni b Nehra	11	19	1	0	57.89
Angelo Mathews	c †Dhoni b Nehra	0	2	0	0	0.00
Thilina Kandamby	run out (Kohli/Jadeja)	31	45	2	0	68.88
Chamara Kapugedera	not out	55	88	4	1	62.50
Farveez Maharoof	c †Dhoni b Khan	10	14	1	0	71.42
Nuwan Kulasekara	st †Dhoni b Jadeja	20	16	4	0	125.00
Lasith Malinga	c Jadeja b Nehra	7	11	1	0	63.63
Muttiah Muralitharan	c †Dhoni b Jadeja	2	5	0	0	40.00
Extras	(b 4, lb 3, nb 2, w 9)	18				
Total	(all out; 44.4 overs)	187		16	1	

Fall of wickets: 1/5 (Dilshan, 0.5 ov), 2/31 (Tharanga, 7.6 ov), 3/50 (Jayawardene, 13.3 ov), 4/50 (Mathews, 13.5 ov), 5/51 (Sangakkara, 15.4 ov), 6/104 (Kandamby, 29.2 ov), 7/132 (Maharoof, 35.3 ov), 8/168 (Kulasekara, 40.3 ov), 9/177 (Malinga, 43.2 ov), 10/187 (Muralitharan, 44.4 ov)

India bowling
Bowler	Overs	Maidens	Runs	Wickets	Econ	Wides	NBs
Praveen Kumar	9	1	29	1	3.22	2	0
Zaheer Khan	8	2	36	2	4.50	2	0
Ashish Nehra	9	0	40	4	4.44	3	0
Harbhajan Singh	9	0	30	0	3.33	1	0
Virat Kohli	3	0	16	0	5.33	0	1
Ravindra Jadeja	6.4	0	29	2	4.35	0	1
