= 2016 Asia Cup final =

Cricket tournament final in Bangladesh

2016 Asia Cup Final
- Event: 2016 Asia Cup
Bangladesh	India
(Bangladesh)	(India)
120/5	122/2
(15 overs)	(13.5 overs)
- India won by 8 wickets
- Date: 6 March 2016
- Venue: Sher-e-Bangla National Cricket Stadium, Mirpur
- Player of the match: Shikhar Dhawan (Ind)
- Umpires: Ruchira Palliyaguruge (SL) and Shozab Raza (Pak)
- Attendance: 24,000+

The 2016 Asia Cup final was a Twenty20 cricket match played on 6 March 2016 at the Sher-e-Bangla National Cricket Stadium, Mirpur, which was played between Bangladesh and India to determine the winner of the 2016 season of the Asia Cup. India defeated Bangladesh by 8 wickets to win their sixth Asia Cup title. Shikhar Dhawan was named as the player of the match for scoring 60 runs off 44 balls.

== Road to the final ==
Pos	Team	Pld	W	L	T	NR	Pts	NRR
1	India	4	4	0	0	0	16	2.020
2	Bangladesh	4	3	1	0	0	12	0.458
3	Pakistan	4	2	2	0	0	8	−0.296
4	Sri Lanka	4	1	3	0	0	4	−0.293
5	United Arab Emirates	4	0	4	0	0	0	−1.813

Advance to Final

=== India ===
India dominated throughout the tournament. In the group stage, they defeated Bangladesh, Pakistan, Sri Lanka and United Arab Emirates, to qualify in the final. Rohit Sharma, Virat Kohli, Jasprit Bumrah and Hardik Pandya were India's top performers throughout the group stage.

=== Bangladesh ===
After losing the first match to India, Bangladesh made a strong comeback by defeating United Arab Emirates, Sri Lanka and Pakistan in the group stage to qualify in the final. Sabbir Rahman, Soumya Sarkar, Al-Amin Hossain and Mahmudullah were top performers for Bangladesh throughout the group stage.

== Match details ==
=== Match officials ===
- On-field umpires: Ruchira Palliyaguruge (SL) and Shozab Raza (Pak)
- TV Umpire: Enamul Haque (Ban)
- Reserve umpire: Anil Chaudhary (Ind)
- Match referee: Jeff Crowe (NZ)
- Toss: India won the toss and elected to field

=== Summary ===
Hours before the toss, heavy rain lashed Bangladesh capital Dhaka. The game was reduced to 15 overs a side, with fielding restrictions for five overs. A bowler could bowl a maximum of three overs.

Winning the toss, India elected to field first. Bangladesh set up a total of 120/5 off 15 overs. Mahmudullah's 33 and Sabbir Rahman's 32 helped Bangladesh reach a fighting total. Ashwin, Jadeja, Nehra and Bumrah each got one wicket. India chased the total successfully with 13-balls to spare losing only 2 wickets in the process thanks to Shikhar Dhawan's 60 off 44 balls and Virat Kohli's 41 off 28 balls.

6 March
19:30 (D/N)
Scorecard

Bangladesh; 120/5 (15 overs)	v	India; 122/2 (13.5 overs)
Mahmudullah 33* (13); Jasprit Bumrah 1/13 (3 overs)		Shikhar Dhawan 60 (44); Taskin Ahmed 1/14 (3 overs)

India won by 8 wickets
Sher-e-Bangla National Cricket Stadium, Mirpur
Umpires: Ruchira Palliyaguruge (SL) and Shozab Raza (Pak)
Player of the match: Shikhar Dhawan (Ind)

- India won the toss and elected to field.
- The match was reduced to 15 overs per side due to rain.

== Scorecard ==
Bangladesh batting
Player	Status	Runs	Balls	4s	6s	Strike rate
Tamim Iqbal	lbw b Bumrah	13	17	2	0	76.47
Soumya Sarkar	c Pandya b Nehra	14	9	3	0	155.55
Sabbir Rahman	not out	32	29	2	0	110.34
Shakib Al Hasan	c Bumrah b Ashwin	21	16	3	0	131.25
Mushfiqur Rahim †	run out (Kohli/†Dhoni)	4	5	0	0	80.00
Mashrafe Mortaza *	c Kohli b Jadeja	0	1	0	0	0.00
Mahmudullah	not out	33	13	2	2	253.84
Nasir Hossain	did not bat					
Al-Amin Hossain	did not bat					
Abu Hider	did not bat					
Taskin Ahmed	did not bat					
Extras	(w 3)	3				
Total	(5 wickets; 15 overs)	120		12	2	

Fall of wickets: 1/27 (Sarkar, 3.6 ov), 2/30 (Tamim, 4.4 ov), 3/64 (Shakib, 9.1 ov), 4/75 (Rahim, 11.3 ov), 5/75 (Mortaza, 11.4 ov)

India bowling
Bowler	Overs	Maidens	Runs	Wickets	Econ	Wides	NBs
Ravichandran Ashwin	3	0	14	1	4.66	1	0
Ashish Nehra	3	0	33	1	11.00	1	0
Jasprit Bumrah	3	0	13	1	4.33	0	0
Ravindra Jadeja	3	0	25	1	8.33	0	0
Hardik Pandya	3	0	35	0	11.66	1	0

India batting
Player	Status	Runs	Balls	4s	6s	Strike rate
Rohit Sharma	c Sarkar b Al-Amin	1	5	0	0	20.00
Shikhar Dhawan	c Sarkar b Taskin	60	44	9	1	136.36
Virat Kohli	not out	41	28	5	0	146.42
MS Dhoni *†	not out	20	6	1	2	333.33
Suresh Raina						
Yuvraj Singh						
Hardik Pandya						
Ravindra Jadeja						
Ravichandran Ashwin						
Jasprit Bumrah						
Ashish Nehra						
Extras		0				
Total	(2 wickets; 13.5 overs)	122		15	3	

Fall of wickets: 1/5 (Rohit, 1.3 ov), 2/99 (Dhawan, 12.4 ov)

Bangladesh bowling
Bowler	Overs	Maidens	Runs	Wickets	Econ	Wides	NBs
Taskin Ahmed	3	0	14	1	4.66	0	0
Al-Amin Hossain	2.5	0	30	1	10.58	0	0
Abu Hider	1	0	14	0	14.00	0	0
Shakib Al Hasan	2	0	26	0	13.00	0	0
Mashrafe Mortaza	2	0	16	0	8.00	0	0
Nasir Hossain	3	0	22	0	7.33	0	0

Key

- * – Captain
- † – Wicket-keeper
- c Fielder – Indicates that the batsman was dismissed by a catch by the named fielder
- b Bowler – Indicates which bowler gains credit for the dismissal
