= Vinoo Mankad Trophy =

Under-19 List-A cricket tournament in India

- Countries: India
- Administrator: Board of Control for Cricket in India (BCCI)
- Format: Limited overs cricket
- Latest edition: 2022
- Next edition: 2023
- Tournament format: Round robin and Playoff
- Current champion: Maharashtra U-19
- Website: Bcci.tv

Vinoo Mankad Trophy is a national level under 19 age group One-day cricket tournament of India. Board of Control for Cricket in India organises it. It involves junior teams of affiliated state cricket association of BCCI. The tournament is named after the Indian former cricketer Vinoo Mankad.
