= Delhi Premier League T20 =

T20 cricket league played in Delhi, India

- Countries: India
- Administrator: Delhi & District Cricket Association
- Format: Twenty20
- First edition: 2024
- Next edition: 2026
- Tournament format: Round-robin and playoffs
- Number of teams: Men's (8); Women's (4)
- Current champion: West Delhi Lions (1st Title)
- Most successful: East Delhi Riders (1 Title)
- Most runs: Priyansh Arya (SDS)
- Most wickets: Simardeep Singh (EDR)
- TV: Star Sports; JioHotstar

Delhi Premier League T20 is a Twenty20 franchise cricket tournament in the union territories of Delhi, India. Organised by the Delhi & District Cricket Association (DDCA), it was first contested during the 2024 season.

The league will be contested by Eight teams representing different districts in the union territories of Delhi.

Almost all matches take place as back-to-back double-headers at the same venue on the same day.

Adani Group was the title sponsor for the 2024 competition. The inaugural edition of the tournament had a draft of 270 players.

The 2025 season of the Delhi Premier League (DPL) is scheduled to take place from 2 August to 31 August 2025, with all matches hosted at the Arun Jaitley Stadium in New Delhi. The tournament follows a round-robin and playoff format, featuring a total of eight teams, including two new additions: Outer Delhi Warriors and New Delhi Tigers. A total of 40 matches will be played, with most games held as double-headers on the same day. The auction for the 2025 edition was conducted on 6 July 2025, involving both marquee players and emerging talent, including prominent names such as Rishabh Pant, the nephew of Virat Kohli, and the son of Virender Sehwag. The defending champions for this edition are the East Delhi Riders. The league stage will be followed by playoffs, including Qualifier 1, Eliminator, Qualifier 2, and the Final on 31 August 2025, with a reserve day scheduled for 1 September 2025.

== Teams ==
=== Men's ===
Eight franchises compete in the men's competition.

Team locations

Team	District	Debut	Captain	Owner(s)
Central Delhi Kings	Central Delhi	2024	Jonty Sidhu	Utech Developers Pvt. Ltd
East Delhi Riders	East Delhi	2024	Anuj Rawat	Areion Finserve Pvt. Ltd
New Delhi Tigers	New Delhi	2025	Himmat Singh	Bheema Tolling, Traffic Solutions Private Limited, Crayon Advertising Limited
North Delhi Strikers	North Delhi	2024	Harshit Rana	Gupta Jee Tent Services Pvt. Ltd.
Outer Delhi Warriors	Outer Delhi	2025	Siddhant Sharma	Savita Paints Private Limited
Purani Dilli 6	Old Delhi	2024	Vansh Bedi	SISL Infotech Pvt. Ltd
South Delhi Superstarz	South Delhi	2024	Ayush Badoni	Real Force Resources Pvt Ltd
West Delhi Lions	West Delhi	2024	Nitish Rana	Brew Force Limited

=== Women's ===
Four franchises compete in the women's competition.

Team locations

Team	District	Owner(s)
South Delhi Superstarz	South Delhi	Real Force Resources Pvt Ltd
East Delhi Riders	East Delhi	Areion Finserve Pvt. Ltd
Central Delhi Queens	Central Delhi	Utech Developers Pvt. Ltd
North Delhi Strikers	North Delhi	Gupta Jee Tent Services Pvt. Ltd.

== Seasons and results ==
Men's competition
Season	Final				Player of the season
Season	Venue	Winners	Result	Runners-up	Player of the season
2024	Arun Jaitley Cricket Stadium, New Delhi	183/5 (20)Overs; East Delhi Riders	Scorecard; Won by 3 runs	180/9 (20); South Delhi Superstarz	Priyansh Arya

== Team performance ==
Men's competition
Franchise/Season	2024	2025
Central Delhi Kings	5th	RU
East Delhi Riders	C	3rd
New Delhi Tigers		5th
North Delhi Strikers	SF	6th
Purani Delhi 6	SF	8th
South Delhi Superstarz	RU	4th
Outer Delhi Warriors		7th
West Delhi Lions	6th	C

- C: champions
- RU: runner-up
- SF or PO: team qualified for the semi-final stage

Women's competition
Franchise/Season	2024	
Central Delhi Queens	4th	
East Delhi Riders	3rd	
North Delhi Strikers	C	6th
South Delhi Superstarz	RU	

- C: champions
- RU: runner-up

== Records ==
=== Men's competition ===
Highest team totals
Score	Team	Opponent	Season
308/5 (20 overs)	South Delhi Superstarz	North Delhi Strikers	2024
254/5 (20 overs)	South Delhi Superstarz	Central Delhi Kings	2024
241/0 (20 overs)	East Delhi Riders	Purani Dilli 6	2024
235/3 (20 overs)	South Delhi Superstarz	Purani Delhi 6	2024
228/4 (20 overs)	South Delhi Superstarz	West Delhi Lions	2024

Highest individual scores
Batter	Runs	Opponent	Season
Ayush Badoni (South Delhi Superstarz)	165	North Delhi Strikers	2024
Anuj Rawat (East Delhi Riders)	121 not out	Purani Delhi 6	2024
Priyansh Arya (South Delhi Superstarz)	120	North Delhi Strikers	2024
Sujal Singh (East Delhi Riders)	108 not out	Purani Delhi 6	2024
Priyansh Arya (South Delhi Superstarz)	107 not out	Purani Delhi 6	2024
