= Bengal Pro T20 League =

Twenty20 cricket league in West Bengal, India

- Countries: India
- Administrator: Cricket Association of Bengal
- Headquarters: Kolkata, West Bengal
- Format: Twenty20
- First edition: 2024
- Latest edition: 2026
- Next edition: 2027
- Tournament format: Round Robin and Playoffs
- Number of teams: M: 8 W: 8
- Current champion: M: Shrachi Rarh Tigers(1st title); W: Adamas Howrah Warriors(1st title)
- Most successful: M: Sobisco Smashers Malda(2024), Murshidabad Kings(2024), Adamas Howrah Warriors(2025), Shrachi Rarh Tigers(2026); W: Lux Shyam Kolkata Tigers (2 titles)
- Most runs: M: Priyanshu Gaurav Srivastava; W: Dhara Gujjar (221)
- Most wickets: M: Mukesh Kumar (16); W: Piyali Ghosh (12)
- TV: FanCode
- Website: bengalt20.com
- 2025 Bengal Pro T20 League

The Bengal Pro T20 League, also known as Bengal Pro T20 or BPLT20, is a men's and women's professional Twenty20 cricket league in West Bengal, India. It is organised by the Cricket Association of Bengal (CAB) and contested by eight district-based franchise teams. It is usually played during post summer season from June to August of every year.

The format was invented with the expectation that each match would last around three-and-a-half hours. The Viacom 18 showed Sports18 TV broadcasts of the competition, while all of the women's matches and some of the men's matches were available to stream for free on JioCinema.

Almost all matches take place as back-to-back double-headers at the same venue on the same day. The venue for Men's was the historic Eden Gardens, and the women's were played at the Jadvapur University Salt Lake Campus ground, which also hosts First Class Matches.

== History ==
The inaugural season was held at the Eden Gardens, Kolkata in 2024, with eight franchises.

The league will feature players from the state, including those with Indian Premier League (IPL) and international experience.

The first season of the league was initially planned to be held from 11 June to 28 June 2024.

The inaugural edition of the league reached a cumulative audience of over 150 million through TV, digital-social media, and traditional media.

=== Background ===
In 2024, the Bengal Pro T20 League was launched. The West Bengal franchise playing Indian Premier League (IPL), the league was aimed to make up for the absence of high-profile matches in Kolkata in the year and to expose talented players from districts. It was conceived by former BCCI president and then CAB president Sourav Ganguly.

=== Administration ===
The Cricket Association of Bengal (CAB) founded the league in 2024. The league is affiliated to the Board of Cricket Control in India (BCCI).

== Tournament structure ==
In total, there are 34 matches in the league stage of the tournament for both men and women. The four teams that finish top of the league progress to the semi-finals. The winners progress to the final.

== Teams ==
There are eight franchises competing in the league. The franchises are named after a city it is representing in the state. Each team can have a maximum of 17 players, including two outstation players.

Team Locations in West Bengal

Team name	City / Towns	Owners	Men's captain	Women's captain
Adamas Howrah Warriors	Howrah	Rice Adamas Group	Anustup Majumdar	Dhara Gujjar
Harbour Diamonds	Diamond Harbour	GD Sports	Manoj Tiwary	Sukanya Parida
Lux Shyam Kolkata Tigers	Kolkata	Lux Industries and Shyam Steel	Abishek Porel	Mita Paul
Murshidabad Kings & Kueens	Murshidabad	Pritam Electricals and Jalan Builders	Sudip Kumar Gharami	Deepti Sharma
Shrachi Rarh Tigers	Durgapur	Shrachi Sports Ventures	Shahbaz Ahmad	Titas Sadhu
Rashmi Medinipur Wizards	Medinipur	Rashmi Group	Abhimanyu Easwaran	Richa Ghosh
Servotech Siliguri Strikers	Siliguri	Servotech	Akash Deep	Priyanka Bala
Sobisco Smashers Malda	Malda	Sona Biscuites	Mukesh Kumar	Hrishita Basu

== Venues ==
Eden Gardens is used to host all the men's matches.

West Bengal
Kolkata
Eden Gardens
Capacity: 68,000
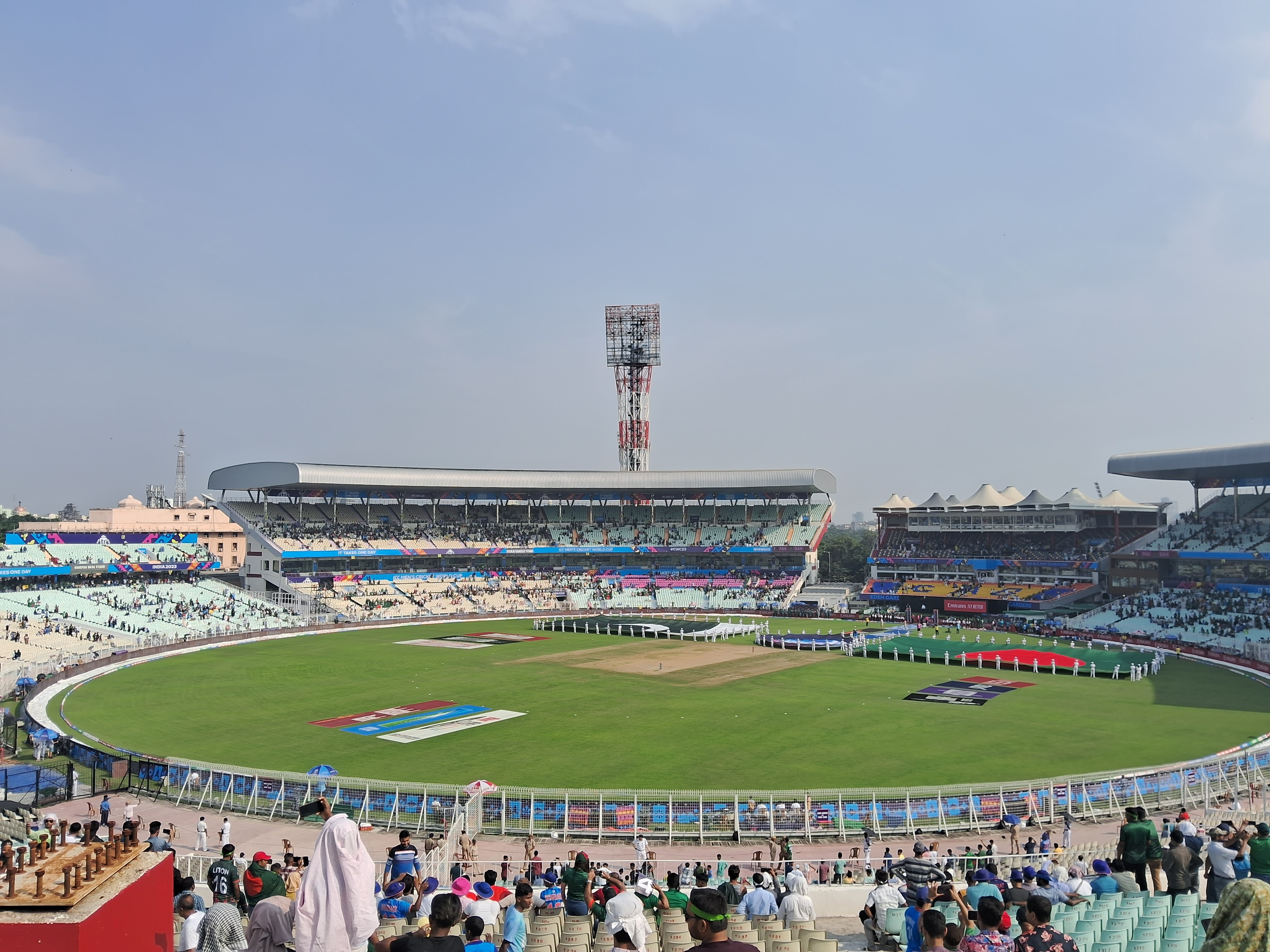

Jadavpur University Campus Ground is used to host all the women's matches except the final which is played in the Eden Gardens.

West Bengal
Kolkata
Jadavpur University Campus Ground
Capacity: 5,000
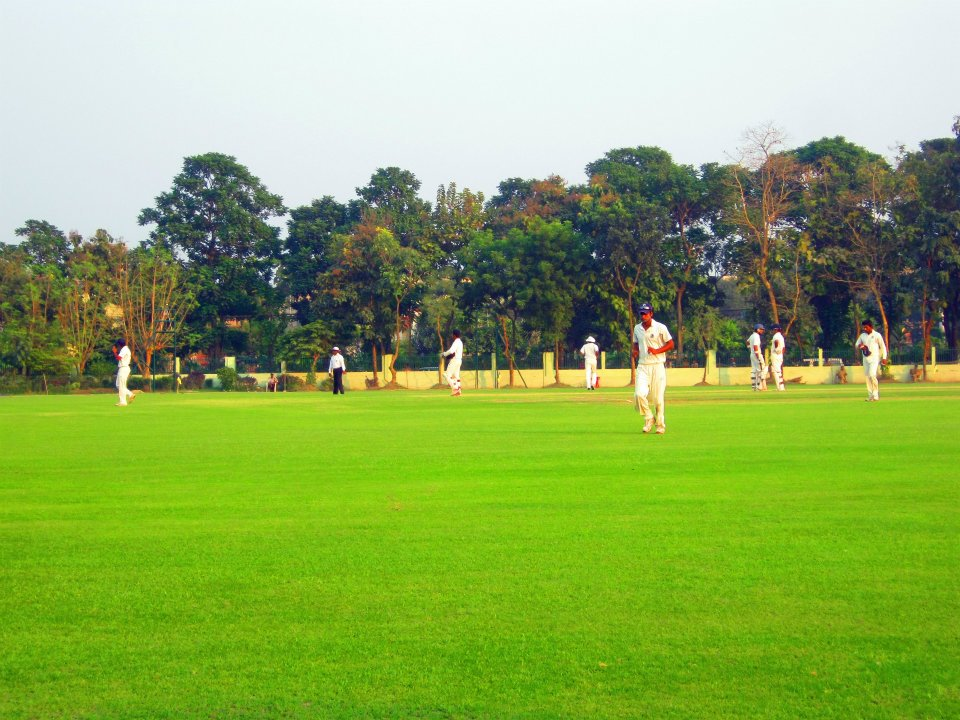

== Tournament seasons and results ==
=== Men's Finals ===
Season	Final					Player of the Match(Final)	Player of the Tournament
Season	Match Summary	Result	Winners	Runners-up	Venue	Player of the Match(Final)	Player of the Tournament
2024	Sobisco Smashers Malda; 116/8 (20 overs) vs Murshidabad Kings; 7/0 (1.1 overs)	Match Abandoned Due To Rain	Both	None	Eden Gardens, Kolkata	Not Decided	Writtick Chatterjee(SSM)
2025	Adamas Howrah Warriors; 150/9 (20 overs) vs Murshidabad Kings; 141/9 (20 overs)	Adamas Howrah Warriors won by 9 runs	Adamas Howrah Warriors	Murshidabad Kings	Eden Gardens, Kolkata	Saksham Sharma(AHW)	Sayan Ghosh(LSKT)
2026	Shrachi Rarh Tigers; 165/4 (15 overs) vs Sobisco Smashers Malda; 97/5 (9 overs)	Shrachi Rarh Tigers won by 9 runs(DLS Method)	Shrachi Rarh Tigers	Sobisco Smashers Malda	Eden Gardens, Kolkata	Shahbaz Ahmed(SRT)	Karan Lal(SSS)

=== Women's Finals ===
Season	Final					Player of the Match(Final)	Player of the Tournament
Season	Match Summary	Result	Winners	Runners-up	Venue	Player of the Match(Final)	Player of the Tournament
2024	Lux Shyam Kolkata Tigers; 110/5 (20 overs) vs Murshidabad Kueens; 105/9 (20 overs)	Lux Shyam Kolkata Tigers won by 5 runs	Lux Shyam Kolkata Tigers	Murshidabad Kueens	Eden Gardens, Kolkata		Mita Paul(LSKT)
2025	Lux Shyam Kolkata Tigers; 104 (19.5 overs) vs Sobisco Smashers Malda; 22/4 (5.2 overs)	Lux Shyam Kolkata Tigers won by 16 runs(DLS)	Lux Shyam Kolkata Tigers	Sobisco Smashers Malda	Eden Gardens, Kolkata	Mita Paul(LSKT)	Mamta Kisku(SSM)
2026	Murshidabad Kueens; 95/9 (20 overs) vs Adamas Howrah Warriors; 96/4 (18.5 overs)	Adamas Howrah Warriors won by 6 wickets	Adamas Howrah Warriors	Murshidabad Kueens	Eden Gardens, Kolkata		Sujata Dey(AHW)

== Broadcasting ==
In 2024, Viacom18 acquired the media rights and became the broadcast partner of the league. Viacom18 broadcasts the matches on Sports18 3 TV channel with commentary in English, Bengali, and Hindi and also streamed Live at their OTT platform, JioCinema. Both the men's and women's matches were also streamed live on Fancode in English.

== Team's performance ==
=== Men's ===
Season Franchise	2024	2025
Adamas Howrah Warriors	5th	C
Harbour Diamonds	8th	Qualified SF (3rd/4th)
Lux Shyam Kolkata Tigers	SF	Qualified SF (3rd/4th)
Murshidabad Kings	C	RU†
Rashmi Medinipur Wizards	SF	6th
Servotec Siliguri Strikers	6th	8th
Shrachi Rarh Tigers	7th	7th
Sobisco Smashers Malda	C‡	5th

=== Women's ===
Season Franchise	2024	2025
Adamas Howrah Warriors	5th	7th
Harbour Diamonds	7th	4th (SF)
Lux Shyam Kolkata Tigers	C	C
Murshidabad Kueens	RU	3rd (SF)
Rashmi Medinipur Wizards	3rd (SF)	6th
Servotec Siliguri Strikers	8th	8th
Shrachi Rarh Tigers	4th (SF)	5th
Sobisco Smashers Malda	6th	RU

- Teams are listed alphabetically by year of entry into the league
- C: champions
- RU: runner-up
- 3rd: third place or semi-finalist
- 4th: fourth place or semi-finalist
- SF/PO: team qualified for the semi-final or playoff stage of the competition
