= List of sports television broadcast contracts =

Sports broadcasting rights in various countries include:

== By region ==
=== Asia–Pacific ===
- India

=== Americas ===
- Canada
- United States

=== Europe ===
- United Kingdom

== By event ==
=== American football ===
- National Football League

=== Association football ===
National team competitions

- 2026 FIFA World Cup
- 2027 AFC Asian Cup
- 2025 Africa Cup of Nations
- 2025 CONCACAF Gold Cup
- 2024 Copa América
- 2028 UEFA European Championship
- 2024 OFC Men's Nations Cup

International club competitions

- UEFA Champions League
- UEFA Europa League
- UEFA Conference League
- Copa Libertadores
- Copa Sudamericana
- FIFA Club World Cup

National club competitions

- Premier League
- English Football League
- FA Cup
- EFL Cup
- La Liga
- Copa del Rey
- Serie A
- Coppa Italia
- Bundesliga
- DFB-Pokal
- Ligue 1
- Coupe de France

=== Basketball ===
- NBA
- Euroleague

=== Cricket ===
- 2024 ICC Men's T20 World Cup
- 2023 Cricket World Cup
- 2021–2023 ICC World Test Championship
- Indian Premier League
- Broadcasting contracts in cricket

=== Motorsports ===
- Formula 1
- Formula E
- MotoGP
- FIA World Rally Championship

=== Multisports ===
- 2028 Summer Olympics
- 2026 Winter Olympics

=== Tennis ===
- Australian Open
- French Open
- Wimbledon
- US Open
- ATP Tour
- WTA Tour

=== Mixed martial arts ===
- Ultimate Fighting Championship
- Professional Fighters League

=== Other ===
- Major League Baseball
- National Hockey League
- World Rugby Sevens Series

== See also ==
- Broadcasting of sports events
