= List of Serie A broadcasters =

The rules on Serie A rights in Italy, introduced in 1980, regulate the live or delayed broadcasting of league competition within Italian territory.

== The origins ==
Until 1980, sports facilities was managed by the municipalities with an open media policy, so television journalists staff were given access to all matches, typically at no cost.

The first local private television broadcasters, born during the 1970s, did not take advantage of this opportunity. Partly it depended on organizational reasons and partly on the fact that advertising was not yet a large and structured instrument of profit. Rai based its advertising revenue almost exclusively on Carosello show; this situation ended in 1977. Since 1960, the network has broadcast on Sundays at 7:00pm the delayed commentary of a Serie A match, without the payment of television rights or without this generating financial transactions of a commercial nature.

Furthermore, for reasons of tradition, the matches were all concentrated on Sunday afternoons, and in this regard, popular songs also flourished. This situation made the general picture even more difficult for the commercialization of television rights.

In the years of stadium football, Rai had a regulation that provided for the live broadcasting of Italian championship matches throughout the country, with the exception of the province of the team playing at home in order not to reduce the revenue from tickets sold at the stadium. The regulation had not been negotiated with the Lega Calcio.

As a result, Italian football clubs derived most of their earnings from the sale of match tickets.

== TV rights up for sale ==
The legal institution of exclusive television rights for sale was imported into Italy in 1980, copying it from the Anglo-American model. This is attested by the resolutions and related contracts between Rai and Lega Calcio, which until that moment had no formal and legally connoted relationship.

The contract was based on the Lega Calcio, in exchange for a sum of 3 billion lire, granting Rai the right to install cameras in stadiums to film matches. In practice, this meant closing the gates of stadiums to cameramen from private television stations. The purpose of the agregen was for Rai, as a public body, to become a concessionaire of Lega Calcio, broadcasting football free of charge throughout Italy.

=== Arrival of pay TV ===
The first revolution that goes beyond the free-to-air television began in 1993, with the agreements between Lega Calcio and Telepiù. In this case, the Italian legal system was inspired by the Anglo-Saxon legal institution of encrypted television rights. Furthermore, due to the split of the original institution of 1980, the figure of free-to-air television rights is separated. Thus, since 1993 there have been encrypted rights and FTA rights.

The emergence of FTA rights stems from the desire to limit television viewing of matches to season ticket holders only, with the sole aim of increasing revenue for football clubs. The possibility of following the event on TV therefore clashes with the tradition of going to the stadium, a place often lacking in terms of safety.

Despite the increase in television power, the presence of fans at the stadium continues, albeit with inevitable fluctuations, to maintain its fundamental role.

The contract signed in 1993 between Lega Calcio and Telepiù established that for three seasons, from the 1993-1994 until 1995-1996 championship, TELE+2 channel would broadcast a match from the top Italian football championship, generally the late match at 8.30pm on Sunday, for each of the first 28 matchdays (in the last six rounds there was no such late match to ensure the regularity of the final phase of the tournament). The matches were visible via a decoder only to those who had a six-monthly or annual subscription. The contract allowed the pay TV to choose, at the start of the season, which match to broadcast in each of the first 28 matchdays, but respecting some constraints including a minimum of 2 and a maximum of 5 television broadcasts for each of the 18 teams and the impossibility of broadcasting, in the second half of the season, the same matches as the first half of the season (a constraint subsequently abolished with a subsequent renegotiation, in addition to an increase to 6 of the maximum number of television broadcasts for the big clubs). All the other matches of the championship could be broadcast, as in the past, only in exceptional cases and only in FTA by Rai (midweek recoveries of previously postponed matches and advances dictated by the teams' commitments in international competitions, as long as they did not coincide with the matches chosen by TELE+ at the start of the season, as well as the play-offs at the end of the championship).

=== Telepiù exclusivity ===
In 1996, Telepiù inaugurated its satellite platform DStv (subsequently Telepiù Satellite, D+ and finally TELE+ Digital) and negotiated with Lega Calcio for almost total coverage of Serie A. For three seasons, from the 1996–1997 to the 1998-1999 championship, the new platform broadcast all Serie A matches and no longer just the postponed matches. It was possible to subscribe to the entire championship or just to the matches of a single team; furthermore, through the pay-per-view Palco, it was possible to purchase individual matches. Only the play-offs at the end of the championship, if played in a single match on neutral ground, remained outside the TELE+ offer; the rights for their live broadcast were ceded from time to time by the Lega championship.

=== The fight between TELE+ and Stream TV and they fiesta legislation ===
In 1999, for the first time, the government realized the importance of legislating on the issue of Italian football rights, and then regulated it with the law of 29 March 1999, n. 78, converting the DL of 30 January 1999, n. 15. With this legislative act, not only did the centralized negotiation in use until then cease to exist it was no longer the Lega Calcio that negotiated with the broadcasters. Subjective rights were introduced: football clubs were considered the sole owners of the exploitation rights relating to the events played within their sports facilities, thus being entitled to negotiate them individually. The football championship thus became the scene of competition between two satellite platforms: TELE + Digitale was opposed by Stream TV, owned by the Australian magnate Rupert Murdoch. For four seasons, from the 1999–2000 to the 2002-2003 championship, the tournament was in fact visible partly on TELE+ and partly on Stream. To follow even just their favourite team, fans had to subscribe to both platforms, which also used two different decoders (even though in the following years they made a single decoder available to subscribers, compatible with the encoding systems of both platforms). In the first two seasons, TELE+ had a slight advantage: 11 teams ("led" by the three historic big teams Juventus, Milan and Inter ) against Stream's 7 (led by the four rivals Roma, Lazio, Fiorentina and Parma who, together with the other three, formed the so-called "seven sisters" of the championship). In the 2001-2002 championship, the advantage narrowed: 10 teams for TELE+ and 8 for Stream. In the 2002-2003 championship, however, there was a draw, with 9 teams for each platform. In this last season, the system began to enter into crisis, with many smaller clubs that were slow to sell the rights to one or the other broadcaster, declaring themselves dissatisfied with the financial offers, even causing the start of the championships to be postponed. Regarding the play-offs, they were now included in the television rights of the entire championship (in relation to the teams involved), as they were now played in both the first and second rounds.

=== The arrival of Sky and acquisition of Telepiù ===
The competition for football television rights was halted in 2003, with the acquisition of Telepiù by News Corporation, owner of Stream. Both platforms thus merged into a single platform, Sky Italia. The initial effect of the new monopoly situation, however, was that of even lower offers for the acquisition of rights, especially towards smaller clubs. To counter this, some of these clubs formed a consortium, contributing to the creation of Gioco Calcio, a new television channel managed by Lega Calcio itself. However, the illusion of competing with Sky did not last long, due to the economic weakness of the project: Gioco Calcio even rented four channels from Sky in order to operate. The 2003-2004 championship therefore began with 11 clubs remaining faithful to Sky and the other 7 opting for the League's TV. During the season, however, these clubs broke their contracts one after the other and switched to Sky, which ended the season by achieving its set objective of total coverage of Serie A. Gioco Calcio closed in June 2004, not without leaving behind legal disputes.

=== Satellite rights and Terrestrial rights ===
The 2004–2005 season, expanded from 18 to 20 teams, began with some hesitant clubs and some matches therefore remained without television coverage, but after a few days all found an agreement with Sky, which managed to establish a monopoly on the television rights of Serie A until the end of the first half of the season, in January 2005. The beginning of the second half of the season saw the spread of digital terrestrial transmission technology.

In Italy, the transition of the television signal from analogue to digital began in 1996 for satellite broadcasts (on the initiative of Telepiù) and was completed in 2005, when the process also began for terrestrial transmissions. On 3 January 2004, coinciding with the 50th anniversary of Italian television, digital terrestrial was born, which accompanied analogue TV and then definitively replaced it starting from 2012. In January 2005, two pay TV channels were created on digital terrestrial: Mediaset Premium and LA7 Cartapiù. The situation that arose in the world of television rights for Italian football was singular: due to the obligations to be respected with the Antitrust after the merger between TELE+ and Stream, the rights acquired by Sky were made valid only for satellite broadcasting, therefore the various football clubs could resell the rights for the same matches also to terrestrial pay TV channels.

Starting from the second half of the 2004-2005 championship, Sky maintained the exclusive broadcast rights for all Serie A matches via satellite, facing competition via the airwaves from Mediaset and LA7, which broadcast the same matches at much more convenient costs for users. It therefore started with 9 teams on Mediaset Premium and 8 on Cartapiù, while the remaining three did not cede the terrestrial rights. However, two of them did so during the tournament, bringing the number of teams under contract with Cartapiù to 10, while until the end of the season there remained 9 teams on Premium; furthermore, only one company, not ceding the terrestrial rights, left the total exclusivity of home matches to satellite TV.

In the 2005–2006 season, Mediaset and LA7 reached the point of covering, between them, the entire Serie A: 11 teams on Premium and 9 on Cartapiù. Sky, however, maintained the satellite exclusivity for the entire championship (apart from a couple of teams in the first few days) with the advantage of a single subscription: those who wanted to follow Serie A via digital terrestrial had to buy rechargeable cards for both Premium and Cartapiù, albeit at a more convenient total cost than the annual subscription to Sky.

Starting from the 2006–2007 season, the three pay TVs agreed on a rational division of the rights: Mediaset and LA7 acquired the exclusive rights from the various Serie A companies, then keeping only the terrestrial rights for themselves and reselling the satellite rights to Sky. In this way, Sky continued to ensure coverage of the entire championship on the satellite platform, while on digital terrestrial Mediaset Premium and Cartapiù divided the Serie A teams more or less equally: 10 teams each in the 2006-2007 and 2007–2008 seasons, 11 to Premium and 9 to Cartapiù in the 2008–2009 season. The agreements also included the identification, by both TVs, of 5 or 6 full teams: for each of these teams, the terrestrial broadcaster that had acquired the rights showed all the home games and away games against the other teams for which it had the rights, while the competitor was authorised to show the other away games as well. The full teams, whose all seasonal games could be followed on a single terrestrial operator, were 5 (out of 10 total) for each TV in the 2006–2007 season, 6 for each in the 2007–2008 season and 6 for Premium (out of 11 total) and 5 for Cartapiù (out of 9) in the 2008–2009 season. With this system, most of the matches, for the first time, were broadcast simultaneously on three different platforms.

=== The Melandri Law ===
A series of changes and provisions that were made in the 1999 law were perfected un 2008 with the Legislative Decree no. 9 of 9 January 2008, implementing the delegated law no. 106 of 19 July 2007, the famous Melandri Law (Melandri Law), which, in allowing the Government to legislate on the television rights, overturned some elements foreseen by the 1999 law and affected not only the professional football sector, but all sporting events. The new legislative provision extended the ownership of rights to the organisers of competitions and sporting events, as well as to the relevant participants, thus moving from subjective ownership (by individual football clubs) to the return to joint ownership of the rights by the aforementioned entities and to collective negotiation, through the organiser of the competition (Lega Serie A) and the individual event organizers (the clubs) which have exclusive rights to exercise the same rights.

The League prepares the guidelines for the offer, assignment and formation of rights, which must be approved within 60 days by the AGCOM (Communications Regulatory Authority), after consulting the AGCM (Competition and Market Authority)

The rights must be marketed with the interlocutors by using different competitive procedures, and can carry out multiple tenders for the assignment of rights on the different platforms, or put the platforms in competition with each other, or use both methods: in the event of competition between different platforms, must prepare multiple packages, balanced among themselves, which cannot all be acquired by a single operator, based on what is established by the guidelines indicated by AGCOM and AGCM.

Only operators who have the authorization to broadcast can participate in the tenders. It is forbidden to exclusively acquire all packages relating to live broadcasts, in this way it is intended to ensure the presence of multiple companies and to avoid the acquisition of rights that are not directly exercised by those who buy them, and they duration of license agreements cannot exceed three years.

Contracts signed before May 31, 2006 remain in force until June 30, 2010, even if they derive from the exercise of option or pre-emption rights.

=== The duopoly between Sky and Mediaset and the return of centralised sale ===
In March 2009, the Cartapiù pay-per-view closed its doors to make way for Dahlia TV, which continued its activities. In the final part of the 2008–2009 season, the new platform continued to broadcast the Serie A matches of 9 teams, 5 of which were full-house, while Mediaset Premium maintained the remaining 11 teams, 6 of which were full-house. In the 2009–2010 season, Premium and Dahlia split the top division equally: each of the two terrestrial platforms offered the matches of 10 teams, 6 of which were full-house .

Starting from the 2010–2011 season, the centralised sale of Serie A rights came back into force, no longer dealing with individual clubs but directly with the Lega Serie A, as had happened until 1999. For the viewer, the only change was a different distribution of matches between the two terrestrial operators: while Sky continued to broadcast the entire league, Mediaset Premium broadcast the matches of 12 teams (with first choice rights for 10 of them) and Dahlia TV broadcast those of the remaining 8 (with second choice rights for 3 of them). The disparity both in the number of teams (Mediaset thus came to propose 324 matches out of a total of 380) and in their prestige should have theoretically been compensated by the fact that each of the two platforms was allowed to broadcast all the matches of the assigned teams, without any distinction between home and away: in practice Dahlia thought it wanted to become the TV of the minor teams, deciding to ensure wide television visibility to less important places especially at a local level, having the terrestrial exclusive of the direct clashes between these teams. However, things went differently and the sharp drop in subscriptions caused Dahlia TV to be liquidated and the consequent cessation of all activities on 25 February 2011.

After the closure of Dahlia TV, starting from the last 12 days of the 2010-2011 championship, only two television operators remained to offer live Serie A: Sky via satellite and Mediaset Premium via air. Until 2015, all matches were broadcast on the satellite platform, while the terrestrial platform broadcast the matches involving 12 teams chosen at the beginning of the season (still covering 324 matches out of a total of 380). The 56 direct clashes between the remaining 8 teams were visible exclusively on Sky.

In 2015, a different division of television rights was introduced: Sky continued to broadcast the entire tournament, with exclusive rights to the images of 132 matches (with limited production accessory rights attached), while on Premium all the matches of 8 teams were broadcast live, for a total of 248 matches not exclusively but with exclusive rights to the accessory rights (cameras in the changing rooms, interviews at half-time, double limited production pitchside team, pre-match press conferences).

=== The entrance of DAZN ===
After the failure of two tenders with division of matches by platform and the termination of the contract with the independent intermediary Mediapro, Lega Serie A has assigned the product rights for the first time to Sky (266 matches per season exclusively live) and to Perform (114 matches per season exclusively live), which thus lands on the Italian market with the streaming service DAZN . More precisely, Sky, whose ownership has since passed from 21st Century Fox to Comcast, has purchased the possibility of broadcasting 7 matches per matchday (the Saturday advances at 3pm and 6pm, two Sunday matches at 3pm, the Sunday postponements at 6pm and 8.30pm and the Monday one at 8.30pm) while DAZN the remaining 3 per matchday (the Saturday advances at 8.30pm and Sunday at 12.30pm and one Sunday match at 3pm). It should be said that, as early as May 2018, Sky also began to operate on digital terrestrial with some of its channels, following an agreement with Mediaset Premium . On 15 July 2018, Mediaset Premium signed an agreement with the Perform group to be able to broadcast the channels of the DAZN platform on its network, and consequently also the matches offered by it.

On 20 September 2019, following a commercial agreement between Sky and DAZN, the linear channel DAZN 1 was activated, which broadcasts live the 3 Serie A matches for which the publishing group holds the rights (assisted, during midweek rounds, by the DAZN 1+ channel activated when necessary).

On 26 March 2021, Lega Serie A once again assigned the product rights to DAZN, which, unlike the previous three-year period, will hold the rights to broadcast the entire Serie A championship : the platform will exclusively broadcast 7 matches per round live (the Saturday advance matches at 3pm and 6pm, the Sunday matches at 3pm and the Sunday late matches at 6pm and 8.45pm), including all the big matches of the championship, while the remaining 3 (the Saturday advance match at 8.45pm, the Sunday match at 12.30pm and the Monday late match/Friday advance match at 8.45pm) will be broadcast in co-exclusive; the latter were assigned to Sky on 14 May 2021.

On October 23, 2023, after months of private negotiations, the agreements with Sky Italia and DAZN are renewed for the broadcast of the next 5 seasons (until the 2028–2029 season), for a total of 900 million euros. The agreement also provides for a gradual increase in revenue for each season, as well as the viewing of 4 big matches also on Sky. The division of the matches is the same as the previous three-year period, with all the matches (of which 266 are exclusive) broadcast on DAZN and the remaining 114 matches also broadcast by Sky, with the match broadcast on Sunday no longer being the 12:30 one, but the 18:00 one.

== Broadcasters ==
=== Domestic broadcast ===
Stagione	Pay TV	Free-to-air
1993-1994	TELE+ (28 late matches)	Rai
1994-1995	TELE+ (28 late matches)	Rai
1995-1996	TELE+ (28 late matches)	Rai
1996-1997	TELE+/TELE+ Digitale	Rai
1997-1998	TELE+/TELE+ Digitale	Rai; Telemontecarlo
1998-1999	TELE+/TELE+ Digitale	Rai; Telemontecarlo
1999-2000	TELE+/TELE+ Digitale (home matches of 11 teams); Stream TV (home matches of 7 teams)	Rai
2000-2001	TELE+/TELE+ Digitale (home matches of 11 teams); Stream TV (home matches of 7 teams)	Rai
2001-2002	TELE+/TELE+ Digitale (Home matches of 10 teams); Stream TV (Home matches of 8 teams)	Rai
2002-2003	TELE+/TELE+ Digitale (Home matches of 9 teams); Stream TV (home matches of 9 teams)	Rai
2003-2004	Sky (home matches of 11 teams, later increased to 18); Gioco Calcio (home matches of 7 teams)	Rai
2004-2005	Sky (satellite); Mediaset Premium (digital terrestrial; home matches of 8 teams in the second half of the season, later increased to 10); Cartapiù (digital terrestrial; Home matches of 9 teams in second half of the season)	Rai
2005-2006	Sky (satellite); Mediaset Premium (digital terrestrial; home games of 11 teams); Cartapiù (digital terrestrial, home games of 11 teams)	Mediaset
2006-2007	Sky (satellite); Mediaset Premium (digital terrestrial; all games of 5 teams and home matches of other 5); Cartapiù (digitale terrestrial, all matches of 5 teams and home matches of other 5)	Mediaset
2007-2008	Sky (satellite); Mediaset Premium (digital terrestrial; all matches of 6 teams and home matches of other 4); Cartapiù (digitale terrestre, all matches of 6 teams and home matches of other 4)	Mediaset
2008-2009	Sky (satellite); Mediaset Premium (digital terrestrial; all matches of 6 teams and home matches of other 5); Cartapiù/Dahlia TV (digitale terrestre, all matches of 5 teams and home matches of other 4)	Rai
2009-2010	Sky (satellite); Mediaset Premium (digitale terrestre; all matches of 6 teams and home matches of other 4); Dahlia TV (digitale terrestre, all matches of 6 teams and home matches of other 4)	Rai
2010-2011	Sky (satellite); Mediaset Premium (digital terrestrial; matches of 12 teams); Dahlia TV (digital terrestrial; matches of 8 teams in first 26 rounds)	Rai
2011-2012	Sky (satellite and streaming); Mediaset Premium (digital terrestrial and streaming; matches of 8 teams)	Rai
2012-2013	Sky (satellite and streaming); Mediaset Premium (digital terrestrial and streaming; matches of 8 teams)	Cielo; Rai
2013-2014	Sky (satellite and streaming); Mediaset Premium (digital terrestrial and streaming; matches of 8 teams)	Cielo; Rai
2014-2015	Sky (satellite and streaming); Mediaset Premium (digital terrestrial and streaming; matches of 8 teams)	Cielo; Rai
2015-2016	Sky (satellite e streaming); Mediaset Premium (digital terrestrial and streaming; matches of 8 teams)	Rai
2016-2017	Sky (satellite e streaming); Mediaset Premium (digital terrestrial and streaming; matches of 8 teams)	Rai
2017-2018	Sky (satellite e streaming); Mediaset Premium (digital terrestrial and streaming; matches of 8 teams)	Rai
2018-2019	Sky (266 matches); DAZN (114 matches)	Mediaset; Rai; OneFootball
2019-2020	Sky (266 matches); DAZN (114 matches)	Mediaset; Rai; OneFootball
2020-2021	Sky (266 matches); DAZN (114 matches)	Mediaset; Rai; OneFootball
2021-2022	DAZN (all matches); Sky (114 matches in co-exclusivity)	Mediaset; Rai; OneFootball
2022-2023	DAZN (all matches); Sky (114 matches in co-exclusivity)	Mediaset; Rai; OneFootball
2023-2024	DAZN (all matches); Sky (114 matches in co-exclusivity)	Mediaset; Rai; OneFootball
2024-2025	DAZN (all matches); Sky (114 matches in co-exclusivity)	Mediaset; Rai
2025-2026	DAZN (all matches); Sky (114 matches in co-exclusivity)	Mediaset; Rai
2026-2027	DAZN (all matches); Sky (114 matches in co-exclusivity)	Mediaset; Rai
2027-2028	DAZN (all matches); Sky (114 matches in co-exclusivity)	Mediaset; Rai
2028-2029	DAZN (all matches); Sky (114 matches in co-exclusivity)	Mediaset; Rai

=== International broadcasters ===
==== Africa ====
Country	Broadcasters
Angola	Z Sports
Mozambique	Z Sports
Kenya	Azam Sports
Malawi	Azam Sports
Rwanda	Azam Sports
Tanzania	Azam Sports
Uganda	Azam Sports
Zambia	Azam Sports
Zimbabwe	Azam Sports
Ghana	SportyTV
Kenya	SportyTV
Nigeria	SportyTV
South Africa	SportyTV
Sub-Saharan Africa	SuperSport

==== Americas ====
Country	Broadcasters
Brazil	ESPN; SportyNet; CazéTV
Canada	fubo TV; TLN
Caribbean	ESPN
Latin America	ESPN
Suriname	ATV; QN Sport; SCCN
Puerto Rico; United States	Paramount+ Telemundo

==== Asia and Oceania ====
Country	Broadcasters
Australia	beIN Sports
Bangladesh	Myco
China	Migu
Hong Kong	beIN Sports
India	Unite8 Sports
Indonesia	Emtek; ANTV
Iran	Gem Sport; Persiana Sports
Japan	DAZN
Kazakhstan	Q Sport
Kyrgyzstan	Q Sport
Macau	Macau Cable TV; M Plus
Malaysia	Astro Sports
Maldives	ICE Network
Myanmar	Bebee TV Sports
New Zealand	beIN Sports
Pakistan	Begin
South Korea	SPOTV
Taiwan	ELTA
Thailand	TrueVisions
Vietnam	MyTV

==== Europe ====
Country	Broadcasters
Albania	Tring Sport
Andorra	DAZN
Armenia	Fast Sports
Austria	DAZN
Azerbaijan	SportTV
Belarus	Sport TV; Kinopoisk
Belgium	DAZN
Bosnia and Herzegovina	Arena Sport
Bulgaria	Max Sport
Croatia	Arena Sport
Cyprus	Cytavision Sports
Czech Republic	Sport1
Denmark	TV 2 Sport
Estonia	Setanta Sports; Go3 Sport
Finland	MTV Urheilu
France	DAZN
Georgia	Silk Sport; Setanta Sports
Germany	DAZN
Greece	Magenta Sport
Hungary	Arena4
Iceland	Livey
Ireland	TNT Sports; DAZN
Kosovo	Sport
Latvia	Setanta Sports; Go3 Sport
Liechtenstein	DAZN; Sky Sport
Lithuania	Setanta Sports; Go3 Sport
Luxembourg	DAZN
Malta	Total Sports Network
Moldova	Setanta Sports
Montenegro	Arena Sport
Netherlands	Ziggo Sport
North Macedonia	Arena Sport
Norway	VG+
Poland	Eleven Sports
Portugal	Sport TV
Romania	Digi Sport; Prima Sport
Russia	Match TV
San Marino	DAZN; Sky Sport
Serbia	Arena Sport
Slovakia	Sport1
Slovenia	Arena Sport
Spain	DAZN
Sweden	TV4
Switzerland	DAZN; Sky Sport
Turkey	S Sport
Ukraine	MEGOGO
United Kingdom	TNT Sports; DAZN; BBC Alba/BBC iPlayer

==== Middle East and North Africa ====
Country	Broadcasters
MENA	StarzPlay; Shasha Sports
Bahrain; Kuwait; Saudi Arabia	STC TV
Iraq	Alrabiaa TV
Israel	ONE
