= Broadcasting rights =

Rights which a broadcasting organization negotiates with a commercial concern

Broadcasting rights (often also called media rights) are rights which a broadcasting organization negotiates with a commercial concern—such as a sports governing body or film distributor—in order to show that company's products on television or radio, either live, delayed or highlights.

== Intellectual property ==
The World Intellectual Property Organization (WIPO), one of the 17 specialized agencies of the United Nations, aims to eliminate signal piracy. WIPO maintains that broadcasters' rights:

- safeguard costly investments in televising sporting events
- recognize and reward the entrepreneurial efforts of broadcasting organizations
- recognize and reward their contribution to diffusion of information and culture

=== International law ===
Under the Rome Convention of 1961, broadcasters have exclusive rights for 20 years to authorize or prohibit rebroadcasting, fixation (recording), reproduction and communication to the public of their broadcasts if such communication is made in places accessible to the public against payment of an entrance fee.

The term of protection of broadcasting is computed from the end of the year in which:

- the fixation was made–for phonograms and for performances incorporated therein;
- the performance took place–for performances not incorporated in phonograms;
- the broadcast took place–for broadcasts.

The updating of the international protection of broadcasting organizations has been discussed at length at the WIPO in the ambit of the Standing Committee on Copyright and Related Rights (SCCR) and is still ongoing.

== See also ==
- Broadcast license
- Retransmission consent
- Local marketing agreement
- Brokered programming
- Glossary of broadcasting terms
- List of sports television broadcast contracts
