= Sports broadcasting contracts in Canada =

Sports broadcasting contracts in Canada include:

== Athletics ==
- World Athletics: CBC Sports
- Boston Marathon: TSN
- London Marathon: FloSports
- Rome Marathon: FloSports
- Super League Triathlon: FloSports
- Great North Run: FloSports

== Australian-rules football ==
- Australian Football League: TSN2, TSN.ca, RDS2, RDS.ca and WatchAFL
- AFL Women's: TSN, TSN.ca, WatchAFL

== Baseball ==
=== Major League Baseball ===
- Sportsnet, as its parent company Rogers Communications is the owner of its sole Canadian franchise, the Toronto Blue Jays, holds national rights to Major League Baseball in Canada, including assorted games from U.S. regional sports networks, the MLB All-Star Game, and the postseason. Games air across Sportsnet and its sister national services Sportsnet One and Sportsnet 360. Select Blue Jays and other U.S. teams' games can be broadcast on TVA Sports (Sportsnet's French-language partner).
- Rights to Sunday Night Baseball, plus other regular season matches are held by TSN and RDS (French)
- In French, postseason games are equally split between RDS and TVA Sports. The World Series were solely aired on RDS until 2022. TVA Sports aired the World Series in 2023 and own the rights to the 2025 and 2027 editions. RDS will be the broadcaster in 2024 and 2026.
- Games available on U.S. over-the-air channels available in Canada on cable or satellite, such as national games on Fox, and local coverage on superstations such as WPIX (New York Yankees and New York Mets, occasionally via Buffalo and/or Rochester network affiliates as well), KTLA-TV (selected Los Angeles Dodgers games). MLB Network is also available on some providers.
- The MLB Extra Innings subscription package is available through most Canadian television providers, as well as MLB.tv.
- Apple, beginning in 2022, broadcast two games a week as part of their Friday Night Baseball offering on Apple TV+.

== Basketball ==
=== National Basketball Association ===
The NBA's Canadian marketing arm is managed by Maple Leaf Sports & Entertainment, parent company of the Toronto Raptors. In turn, MLSE is majority-owned by Rogers Communications. Coverage is mostly shared between TSN and Sportsnet networks, along with the MLSE-owned NBA TV Canada. Toronto Raptors games are primarily aired by TSN, TSN2 and RDS, with selected games airing on Sportsnet, Sportsnet One, or Sportsnet 360. Ancillary Raptors content, including game encores, air on NBA TV Canada.

All broadcasters air assorted non-Raptors games throughout the season (TSN promoted that it would air 148 regular-season games in total during the 2017–18 season); NBA TV Canada typically airs selected games and simulcasts of games from U.S. broadcasters (most often from its U.S. counterpart). All remaining games are available through the NBA League Pass out-of-market sports package.

TSN and NBA TV have the Canadian TV rights to broadcast the NBA Summer League and NBA G League.

=== Women's National Basketball Association ===
TSN, Prime Video and NBA TV have the Canadian TV rights to broadcast the WNBA.

On May 5, 2026, WNBA announces media rights agreement with Bell Media that makes the company the official media partner of the Toronto Tempo. TSN will broadcast and stream all Toronto Tempo games, regular season games, plus WNBA All-Star, Draft, playoffs and finals.

=== U.S. college basketball ===
TSN owns the Canadian broadcast rights to the NCAA Division I men's basketball tournament through a deal with ESPN International. CBS coverage of the tournament is also available in Canada. TSN also simulcasts regular-season games from ESPN.

Coverage of games is also available from U.S. networks carried in Canada, such as Big Ten Network and CBS Sports Network, along with broadcast network coverage. An out-of-market sports package offered by some providers includes other games from U.S. outlets that are not otherwise available in Canada.

=== International basketball ===
- FIBA Basketball World Cup and qualifiers: TSN and RDS
- FIBA Women's Basketball World Cup and qualifiers: TSN and RDS

=== Canadian basketball ===
- Canadian Elite Basketball League
  - CBC Gem (all games), CBC Television (select regular season games, conference finals and finals).
  - TSN: All playoff games are available on TSN+. The majority of games are also available on TSN.

== Cricket ==
Willow owns the vast majority of Canadian cricket rights, with live coverage available through its cable TV channel and streaming apps. Willow owns the Canadian and American rights to all ICC events until 2027.

=== International cricket ===
- ICC Cricket World Cup: Willow
- ICC Under-19 Cricket World Cup: Willow
- ACC Asia Cup: Willow
- India home matches: Willow
- England home matches: Willow
- Pakistan home matches: Willow
- Sri Lanka home matches: Willow
- West Indies home matches: Willow
- Australia home matches: Willow
- New Zealand home matches: Willow
- Bangladesh home matches: Willow
- South Africa home matches: Willow
- Zimbabwe home matches: Willow

=== Domestic cricket ===
- Indian Premier League: Willow
- Major League Cricket: Willow
- Global T20 Canada: CBC
- Big Bash League (Australia): Willow
- Royal London One-Day Cup: Willow
- Caribbean Premier League T20: Willow
- Pakistan Super League: Willow
- The Hundred: Willow
- Lanka Premier League: Willow
- Super Smash: CBN
- SA20: Willow

== Curling ==
- Curling Canada:
  - Tim Hortons Brier: TSN and RDS
  - Scotties Tournament of Hearts: TSN and RDS
  - Canada Cup of Curling: TSN and RDS
  - Continental Cup of Curling: TSN and RDS
  - World Curling Championships: TSN and RDS
  - Olympic Trials (Men's and women's): TSN and RDS
  - Olympic Trials (Mixed doubles): CBC Sports
- European Curling Championships: TSN
- Grand Slam of Curling: Sportsnet, CBC
- Provincial championships:
  - Alberta: Sportsnet
  - British Columbia: CBC Sports
  - Manitoba: Sportsnet
  - Ontario: Title Sports Live
  - Saskatchewan: SaskTel, CurlSask YouTube

== Cycling ==
- Tour de France, Vuelta a Espana & other ASO races: FloSports
- Flanders Classics, Amstel Gold Race races: FloSports
- Giro d'Italia and other RCS races: FloSports (through partnership with Discovery)

== Extreme sports ==
- X Games: TSN
- Street League Skateboarding: YouTube

== Golf ==
- TSN and RDS holds rights to all four of the Men's major golf championships—the Masters Tournament, the U.S. Open and other USGA tournaments, the Open Championship (weekend rounds) and other R&A tournaments, and the PGA Championship. Both channels also broadcast the biennial tournaments: Presidents Cup and Ryder Cup. Other events include the Augusta National Women's Amateur, Senior PGA Championship, Asia-Pacific Amateur Championship and Latin America Amateur Championship.
  - U.S. network coverage of the Masters and Open Championship are simulcast by CTV for simsub purposes.
- Golf Channel is available on Canadian television providers, and the majority of its programming, including early-round coverage of PGA Tour events, the European Tour, and LPGA, is carried in the country without blackouts.
  - Golf Channel's Canadian feed also continues to carry early-round coverage of the Open Championship despite that coverage having moved to USA Network in the U.S.
- TSN and CTV 2 carry weekend round coverage of selected PGA Tour events. Its subscription companion service TSN+ also holds rights to PGA Tour Live coverage of events.
- RDS carries live coverage of PGA Tour events carried by U.S. network television (weekend rounds).
- CHCH carries weekend coverage of the LIV Golf series.

== Gridiron football ==
=== Canadian football ===
==== Canadian Football League ====
- TSN – all games including playoffs and Grey Cup
- CTV – selected Saturday afternoon and playoff games since 2024, simulcasts the Grey Cup with TSN.
- RDS – all Montreal and all Ottawa games, as well as select additional games throughout the season, the playoffs and the Grey Cup.

==== Canadian university football ====
As of 2019, CBC Sports and TVA Sports broadcasts the national U Sports playoff games, namely the Mitchell Bowl, the Uteck Bowl, and the Vanier Cup, succeeding Sportsnet (who aired it from 2013 to 2018).

TVA Sports carries many QSSF games. In 2016, Sportsnet's sister broadcast network Citytv began broadcasting a four-game U Sports Game of the Week package. Games not covered by these contracts are often carried by local cable community channels.

In 2015, Global aired a Hardy Trophy semi-final and championship game as part of the Shaw TV (Shaw Cable) Canada West conference package (at the time, Shaw directly owned Global).

As of the 2017–18 season, Canada West conference rights are held by Bell MTS Fibe TV, SaskTel MaxTV and Telus TV (including a regular season package and playoff coverage). The conference also operates an over-the-top subscription service known as Canada West TV, which broadcasts events not shown on these packages.

=== American football ===
==== National Football League ====
Contracts are current as of the 2020 NFL season.

- CTV – Sunday afternoon games, most playoff games, and the Super Bowl.
- TSN – Sunday afternoon games. Airs all primetime game packages, including Sunday Night Football, Monday Night Football, and Thursday Night Football. Additional Sunday afternoon games, and playoff games interfering with other major events carried on CTV, may air on one or more of the TSN feeds.
- Through its relationship with the network, TSN also carries ESPN's NFL studio programming, including NFL Live, Sunday NFL Countdown, and Monday Night Countdown.
- CTV2 simulcasts Sunday Night Football, Thursday Night Football and as of the 2023–24 season, Monday Night Football games with TSN.
- NFL RedZone is available via TSN for TV Everywhere and TSN Direct subscribers.
- RDS / RDS2 – French-language coverage.
- DAZN – NFL Game Pass and streaming of all games, NFL Network, NFL RedZone, and additional archive content, as part of its service. DAZN also distributes the NFL Sunday Ticket service in Canada; while DAZN initially planned to only distribute a digital out-of-market product in Canada, the company backtracked and revived Sunday Ticket following user complaints over the quality of its streams.

Due to Canadian regulations that permit stations from different areas to be carried in the same market, several games may be available in each of the Sunday timeslots through a combination of domestic and American stations from different areas, without a subscription to Sunday Ticket. By contrast, outside a handful of areas where multiple neighbouring network affiliates are available, no more than three games may be aired in a given U.S. market on any Sunday afternoon (up to four games in week 17).

==== U.S. college football ====
Many ESPN College Football games are aired by TSN's feeds, including the regular season and most bowl games (which were, in the past, shared with Sportsnet 360, and not withstanding conflicts with other programming such as the World Junior Hockey Championship), and all College Football Playoff bowls. TSN also carries some of ESPN's studio programming, such as College GameDay.

Coverage of games is also available from U.S. networks carried or available for streaming in Canada:

- Big Ten Network: Big Ten Conference
- CBS Sports Network: Conference USA, Mountain West Conference
- Fox: Big Ten Conference, Big 12 Conference and Mountain West Conference
- CBS: Big Ten Conference
- NBC: Notre Dame home games, Big Ten Conference
- Stadium: Conference USA, Mountain West Conference

An out-of-market sports package offered by some providers includes other games from U.S. outlets that are not otherwise available in Canada (such as Fox Sports Networks, and ESPN games not picked up by the TSN channels)

== Hockey ==
=== National Hockey League ===
Rogers Communications is the sole national rightsholder of the NHL in Canada through the 2037–38 season. Most national telecasts air on Sportsnet properties, and include, but are not limited to:

- Saturday nights:
  - From the 2014–25 to 2025–26 seasons, Sportsnet licensed the Hockey Night in Canada brand from CBC. Exclusive national window for Canadian teams on Saturday nights, multiple games airing across CBC Television, Citytv, and Sportsnet channels.
  - In rare circumstances, due to non-hockey programming conflicts, the Sportsnet regional channels may air different games. However, all four Sportsnet regional channels are available nationwide through the digital services of most providers.
- National Wednesday-night game; Exclusive national Wednesday-night game on Prime Video.
  - From 2014–15 to 2025–26 season, Sportsnet previously aired Wednesday Night Games as Scotiabank Wednesday Night Hockey
- National Monday-night game.
  - Aired on Sportsnet in 2021–22 as Rogers Hometown Hockey (previously on Sundays from 2014 to 2021) and from 2022 to 2024 as Rogers Monday Night Hockey.
  - For the 2024–25 and 2025–26 seasons, these rights were sublicensed to Amazon Prime Video and branded Prime Monday Night Hockey.
- Simulcasts of all-U.S. games from regional sports networks, and U.S. national rightsholders (including ESPN and TNT Sports).
- Stanley Cup Playoffs coverage; all games carried by Sportsnet, with at least one game per-day simulcast by CBC. All games from the conference finals onward are simulcast by Sportsnet and CBC.
- Canadian distribution and marketing rights to the NHL.tv (Sportsnet+) and NHL Centre Ice services, which carries out-of-market games and U.S. nationally televised games not aired by Sportsnet channels.
- Hockey Night in Canada: Punjabi Edition: Coverage of selected Hockey Night in Canada games with Punjabi language commentary on Omni Television.
- Since 2019, the Aboriginal Peoples Television Network (APTN) simulcasts selected Hockey Night in Canada (initially Hometown Hockey prior to 2022) games with commentary in Indigenous languages; the coverage initially focused on Plains Cree, while games in Inuktitut were added in 2025.

French-language rights were sub-licensed to Quebecor Media; all coverage airs on TVA Sports. La super soirée LNH serves as the flagship broadcast on Saturday nights, typically featuring the Montreal Canadiens.

==== Regional ====
Canadian teams also contract with local or regional broadcasters for selected pre-season and regular season games not covered by the national contracts. These deals are separate from the national rights deal, and may cover up to 60 regular-season games per season. Rights are current as of the 2021–22 NHL season.

- Vancouver Canucks: Sportsnet Pacific
- Edmonton Oilers: Sportsnet West
- Calgary Flames: Sportsnet West
- Winnipeg Jets: TSN3
- Toronto Maple Leafs: Sportsnet Ontario (16 games), TSN4 (26 games) (English)
  - Rights to the Maple Leafs' regional telecasts are divided equally between TSN and Sportsnet (whose parent companies own a joint majority stake in the team's parent company). Of Sportsnet's 26 regional Leafs games, ten are broadcast nationally in conjunction with Rogers' national NHL rights, with Molson Canadian as presenting sponsor.
- Ottawa Senators: TSN5 and RDS/RDS2
- Montreal Canadiens: TSN2 and RDS

Each team's regional game broadcasts are restricted to viewers of that team's designated home broadcast region as assigned by the NHL. Outside said region, these broadcasts are made available exclusively through NHL Centre Ice (TV) or Rogers NHL Live (streaming). If the originating channel is available outside a team's region (e.g. out-of-market Sportsnet feeds), the game broadcasts must be blacked out in these other areas. Sportsnet also operates part-time channels for the Canucks, Flames, and Oilers in case of scheduling conflicts: these channels are tied to the Sportsnet One licence. During the period that it held the rights, Sportsnet used City station CJNT as the overflow channel for Canadiens games instead.

Under previous (2002–14) rights deals with RDS, the Canadiens forwent a separate regional rights contract (at the time of its establishment, RDS was the only national French-language sports channel in Canada) and allowed all of its games to be broadcast nationally in French in conjunction with RDS's package. With the transition to TVA Sports as national rightsholder, the Canadiens chose to negotiate a 12-year regional rights deal with RDS (the team is partially owned by the channel's parent BCE Inc.) in the team's designated broadcast region.

U.S. teams in close proximity to the Canada–US border are now also able to sell Canadian regional broadcast rights to their games. During the 2013–14 season, Bell Satellite TV and Bell Fibe TV acquired regional rights to Buffalo Sabres broadcasts for portions of Canada within a 50-mile radius of First Niagara Center, approximately stretching from Niagara Falls to the community of Stoney Creek in Hamilton. Sabres game broadcasts were made available to Bell TV subscribers in this region at no extra cost, and were no longer available as part of the NHL Centre Ice package through other providers serving this region. The Sabres' agreement with Bell eventually ended, and the team later reached a similar agreement with streaming TV provider Fubo beginning in the 2023–24 NHL season. The Detroit Red Wings, whose market borders on Windsor, Ontario, is presumably able to sell similar rights but has not yet done so.

As with other sports properties, game broadcasts on U.S. terrestrial stations carried in Canada, such as ABC's national rights package, are also available without blackout, though from time to time Rogers has simulcast these productions on Citytv for simultaneous substitution purposes.

=== Professional Women's Hockey League ===
As of the 2025–26 PWHL season, games are split across various broadcasters.

In the regular season, Tuesday broadcasts are exclusive to Prime Video, while Wednesday broadcasts are exclusive to TSN. Thursday broadcasts air on both TSN and Sportsnet, while Friday, Saturday and Sunday games air on TSN, Sportsnet, and CBC. All games are broadcast in English on the aforementioned networks. Montreal Victoire games are additionally broadcast in French by RDS, Radio-Canada and Prime Video.

In the playoffs, semifinal game broadcasts are split between TSN/RDS and Prime Video, while the final is exclusive to TSN/RDS.

=== Canadian Hockey League ===
As of the 2021–22 season, the national CHL package is divided between TSN and CBC Sports. Many regular-season games are aired locally by community channels.

- TSN and RDS hold rights to the Memorial Cup and other national CHL-organized events
- TSN will broadcast 30 national games from across the CHL's leagues.
- RDS will broadcast 20 national games from across the CHL's leagues.

=== Other events ===
- TSN and RDS hold broadcast rights to national championships and most international events sanctioned by Hockey Canada, including but not limited to IIHF world championships, the Telus Cup (men's U18), Centennial Cup (men's junior A), Esso Cup (women's U18) and the Allan Cup (senior). In 2020, TSN renewed its rights through the 2033–34 season.
- Spengler Cup: TSN
- Champions Hockey League: TSN
- American Hockey League: Selected Toronto Marlies games are carried by TSN networks. Laval Rocket home games are carried by RDS. The AHL All-Star Challenge has typically been aired by TSN. The former Newfoundland Growlers were broadcast on Rogers TV

== Horse racing ==
Since 2024, Woodbine Entertainment Group has held the Canadian broadcast rights to a number of major domestic and international horse racing events, including the Canadian triple crown (King's Plate, Prince of Wales Stakes, Breeders' Stakes) and U.S. triple crown (Kentucky Derby, Preakness Stakes, Belmont Stakes), the Breeders' Cup, and other domestic and international races (including the Woodbine Mile, the Royal Ascot, and the Prix de l'Arc de Triomphe among others). These events are packaged under the branding Ignite World Racing, with Woodbine sublicensing television rights to Sportsnet and Citytv, and also handling distribution via partnered sports betting services.

In 2026, Woodbine added CBC Sports to the partnership, with CBC Gem and the CBC Sports YouTube channel holding domestic and international streaming rights to selected events (including the Woodbine Oaks, Prince of Wales Stakes, and Breeders' Stakes), with selected events still airing on Sportsnet or Citytv.

Previously, TSN held Canadian rights to the U.S. triple crown, as well as the Canadian triple crown (additionally airing on CTV).

== Lacrosse ==
- National Lacrosse League: FloSports

== Kickboxing ==
- King of Kings: DAZN: October 2022 to October 2025, all fights
- Glory: Fight Network

== Mixed martial arts ==
- Ultimate Fighting Championship: Paramount+ (numbered events, from 2027 until 2032), Sportsnet, TVA Sports
- Cage Warriors: UFC Fight Pass
- Combate Americas: Univision Canada
- IBJJF Pan-American Championship: FloSports
- KSW: Fight Network
- Professional Fighters League: YouTube

== Motorsports ==
=== FIA ===
- Formula One: TSN (Sky F1's coverage), RDS, F1 TV Pro
  - F1 Academy: TSN
  - Formula 2: TSN
  - Formula 3: TSN
  - Porsche Supercup: TSN
- WRC: Red Bull TV & WRC+
  - ERC: RDS2 (Highlights)
- Formula E: TSN

=== Stock car ===
- NASCAR
  - Bell Media holds rights to the NASCAR Cup Series, NASCAR Xfinity Series, and NASCAR Craftsman Truck Series; races generally air on TSN, with CTV simulcasting races for simsub purposes, and some ancillary content streaming on TSN+. Xfinity Series races are carried by USA Network.
  - As of 2025, REV TV Canada holds rights to the NASCAR Canada Series, producing live broadcasts for all races. It also holds rights to other NASCAR International circuits (such as the NASCAR Mexico Series).

=== IndyCar ===
- IndyCar Series: TSN

=== FIM ===
- MotoGP: Fox Sports Racing, REV TV Canada, Sportsnet
- Superbike World Championship: REV TV

=== International Motor Sports Association ===
- WeatherTech SportsCar Championship: REV TV
- Ultra 94 Porsche GT3 Cup Challenge Canada by Yokohama: REV TV (Highlights)

=== Other ===
- American Flat Track: Fox Sports Racing
- Extreme E: REV TV, RDS
- NHRA: Fox Sports Racing
- Nitrocross: REV TV
- World Rally Championship: REV TV

== Multi-sport events ==
- Olympic Games: CBC and Radio-Canada
  - Coverage also simulcast on Sportsnet, TSN, and RDS.

== Professional wrestling ==
- WWE
  - Since January 6, 2025, weekly series Raw, SmackDown, and NXT, as well as premium live events such as WrestleMania, have been broadcast exclusively on Netflix in Canada as part of a global contract. This contract is nominally for 10 years (until the end of 2034) but may be shortened to five years (2029) or extended to 20 years (2044) at Netflix's option.
  - Quarterly Saturday Night's Main Event specials stream live within Canada on WWE's YouTube channel.
  - Under separate U.S. distribution deals (2024–2029), NXT is also aired on broadcast network The CW, while Saturday Night's Main Event is also available on NBC, both available to many cable and satellite subscribers.
- All Elite Wrestling
  - TSN2 (Dynamite)
  - USA Network Canada / TSN+ (Collision)
- New Japan Pro-Wrestling: The Roku Channel
- TNA Wrestling: Sportsnet 360
- Women of Wrestling: CHCH-DT / CHEK-DT

== Rugby ==
=== Rugby Union ===
==== International ====
- Rugby World Cup: TSN and RDS
- Six Nations Championship: Premier Sports
- Nations Championship: Premier Sports
- Nations Cup: TSN
- The Rugby Championship: Premier Sports
- Rugby Europe Championship: FloSports
- Pacific Nations Cup: TSN
- World Rugby Junior World Championship: TSN and Premier Sports
- SVNS: TSN/RugbyPass TV

==== Club ====
- Super Rugby: TSN and Premier Sports
- Gallagher Premiership: Sportsnet World
- United Rugby Championship: Sportsnet World
- Top14: Premier Sports
- European Rugby Champions Cup: ECR TV
- European Rugby Challenge Cup: ECR TV
- Major League Rugby:The Rugby Network

=== Rugby League ===
- Rugby League World Cup: Premier Sports
- National Rugby League (Select matches): Sportsnet World
- Super League (Select matches): Sportsnet World

== Skiing ==
- Alpine Skiing World Cup: CBC Sports
- Alpine Skiing World Championships: CBC Sports

== Soccer ==
=== Major League Soccer ===
Beginning with the 2023 season, Apple is the primary global rightsholder to Major League Soccer and the Leagues Cup through its Apple TV streaming service, under a contract in effect until 2032.

From 2023 to 2026, Bell Media, through TSN and RDS, will simulcast coverage of at least one MLS match per week involving a Canadian club, as well as select playoff and Leagues Cup matches. Coverage of games aired by the Fox broadcast network will also be available to most Canadian TV service subscribers.

=== Canadian Premier League ===
As of the 2026 season, English-language broadcasts of all 112 regular season matches are carried by OneSoccer, with additional broadcasts on TSN and CBC for select games. In addition, all FC Supra du Quebec games are broadcast in French, with game broadcasts split between TVA Sports (18 matches) and RDS (10 matches).

=== Northern Super League ===
As of the 2026 season, all English-language broadcasts are split between TSN, CBC, and the league's own YouTube channel. Additionally, French-language broadcasts are aired for all Montreal Roses games, split between RDS and Radio-Canada. Any playoff matches involving Montreal will be broadcast by RDS.

=== Canadian and North American soccer ===
- CONCACAF Gold Cup: OneSoccer and TSN
- CONCACAF Champions Cup: OneSoccer
- CONCACAF Central American Cup: OneSoccer
- CONCACAF Nations League: OneSoccer
- Leagues Cup: Apple TV, TSN and RDS
- Campeones Cup: Apple TV
- Canadian Soccer Association-organized events, including national team FIFA World Cup Qualifiers: OneSoccer
- Canadian Premier League: OneSoccer and TSN
- Canadian Championship: OneSoccer and TSN/RDS
- U.S. Open Cup: MLS Season Pass (seven remaining matches in 2024, four QFs, both SFs, and a final)
- NWSL: TSN and OneSoccer
- CONCACAF Under-20 Championship: OneSoccer

=== South American soccer ===
- Copa America: TSN
- Copa Libertadores: beIN Sports
- Copa Sudamericana: beIN Sports
- Recopa Sudamericana: beIN Sports
- Argentine Primera División: Fanatiz
- Argentine Primera B: Fanatiz
- Campeonato Brasileiro Série A: Fanatiz
- Campeonato Brasileiro Série B: Fanatiz
- Colombian Liga Águila: Fanatiz
- Chilean Primera División: TBD
- Ecuadorian Serie A:
- Peruvian Liga 1: Fanatiz
- Uruguayan Primera División:
- Copa Argentina: Fanatiz
- Copa Aguila: Fanatiz

=== International soccer ===
- FIFA Women's World Cup: Rights to the 2027 and 2031 tournaments in both English and French are held by Netflix.
- FIFA Men's World Cup: TBA
- FIFA Club World Cup: DAZN
- FIFA Intercontinental Cup: DAZN (first both matches only) and beIN Sports (last three matches)
- FIFA Women's Champions Cup: DAZN
- FIFA World Cup qualifiers:
  - CONCACAF: OneSoccer
  - CONMEBOL: Fanatiz
  - AFC: YouTube (selected first and second round matches), OneFootball and Unbeaten Sports Channel (all third, fourth, and fifth round matches)
  - CAF: FIFA+
  - UEFA: TBA (2030)
- African Cup of Nations: beIN Sports
- International Champions Cup: DAZN
- Women's International Champions Cup: DAZN

=== European soccer ===
- UEFA European Championship: TSN (English) and TVA (French) (finals tournament only), DAZN (2024 and 2028 qualifiers only)
- UEFA Women's Championship: TSN
- UEFA Nations League: DAZN (until 2026–27)
- UEFA Champions League: DAZN (until 2026–27) and Paramount+ (from 2027–28 until 2030–31)
- UEFA Europa League: DAZN (until 2026–27) and Paramount+ (from 2027–28 until 2030–31)
- UEFA Super Cup: Paramount+ (2027 until 2030
- UEFA Youth League: DAZN (until 2026–27) and Paramount+ (from 2027–28 until 2030–31)
- UEFA Women's Champions League: OneSoccer
- Premier League: FuboTV
- La Liga: TSN and RDS
- Segunda División: TSN and RDS, LaLiga Sports TV
- Serie A: FuboTV, TLN
- Supercoppa Italiana and Coppa Italia: FuboTV
- Bundesliga: DAZN, OneSoccer
- DFB-Pokal: DAZN
- DFL-Supercup: DAZN
- 3. Liga: YouTube
- Regionalliga: OneFootball
- Ligue 1: beIN Sports (English and Spanish), OneSoccer (English language for Lille matches only), and TV5 (French)
- Coupe de France: beIN Sports (English and Spanish)
- Trophée des Champions: beIN Sports (English and Spanish)
- EFL Championship: DAZN
- EFL League One: DAZN
- EFL League Two: DAZN
- EFL Cup: DAZN
- FA Cup: Sportsnet
- FA Community Shield: Sportsnet
- FA Women's Super League: Sportsnet
- Scottish Premiership: N/A
- Primeira Liga: beIN Sports (English, Spanish, and Portuguese)
- Taça de Portugal: beIN Sports (English, Spanish, and Portuguese)
- Turkish Super Lig: beIN Sports
- Eredivisie: Sportsnet World, Sportsnet+
- Belgian Pro League: DAZN
- Austrian Bundesliga: OneFootball
- NIFL Premiership: OneFootball
- Swiss Super League: SFL TV
- Swiss Cup: Cupplay.ch
- Czech First League: OneFootball
- Slovak Super Liga: OneFootball
- Eliteserien: OneFootball
- Danish Superliga: OneFootball

As with other sports properties, game broadcasts on U.S. terrestrial stations carried in Canada, such as selected Premier League games aired on the NBC broadcast network as part of NBC's U.S. rights package, are not subject to blackout for Canadians receiving those stations over-the-air or through a cable/satellite package.

=== Asian soccer ===
- 2027 AFC Asian Cup: TBA
- AFC Champions Leagues both Elite and Two, as well as women's league: Eurovision Sport (women's only) and OneFootball
- AFC Challenge League: YouTube
- J.League: YouTube via J.League International (live coverage for League cup and J1 matches only, with highlights for all three leagues and a league cup)
- K League 1: K League TV
- Men's and Women's A-Leagues: YouTube
- Australia Cup: YouTube
- Indian Super League: YouTube
- Saudi Pro League: Recast
- Saudi King's Cup: Recast
- Saudi Super Cup: Recast

== Swimming ==
- International Swimming League: CBC Sports
- World Swimming Championships: CBC Sports

== Tennis ==
- TSN and RDS hold rights to all Grand Slams, as well as the ATP Tour (Masters 1000 and 500, excluding the Canadian Open)
- ATP Finals: TSN and RDS
- Canadian Open: Sportsnet and TVA Sports
- United Cup: TSN and RDS
- ATP Tour 250: TSN
- Next Generation ATP Finals: TSN and RDS
- WTA Finals: DAZN, TSN, TVA Sports
- WTA 1000: DAZN, TSN, TVA Sports
- WTA 500: DAZN, TSN (Washington), TVA Sports
- WTA 250: DAZN and TSN (Hertogenbosch, Eastbourne and Hamburg)
- Fed Cup: CBC
- Davis Cup: CBC

== Other ==
- Royal St. John's Regatta: CJON-TV, Rogers TV
- eSports: Game+, Ginx TV
- Nathan's Hot Dog Eating Contest: TSN
- Chess: Game+
- Pickleball: Game+
- Financial Modeling World Cup: TSN

== See also ==
- List of sports television broadcast contracts
