= List of 2028 Summer Olympics broadcasters =

The 2028 Summer Olympics in Los Angeles will be televised by a number of broadcasters throughout the world. As with previous years, Olympic Broadcasting Services (OBS) will produce the world feed provided to local broadcasters for use in their coverage.

== Broadcasters ==
In the United States, the Games will be broadcast by NBCUniversal properties, as part of a long-term contract with the IOC through 2036. Although NBC spun off CNBC, USA Network, Golf Channel, and its other cable operations into a new company called Versant at the end of 2025, an agreement was made for those cable channels to continue airing Olympics coverage in the short term. Warner Bros. Studios’ The Ranch Lot is planned to be the site of the International Broadcast Centre for the Games, while Hollywood Park Studios by SoFi Stadium will host the Main Press Center.

On January 16, 2023, the IOC renewed its European pay television and streaming rights agreements with Warner Bros. Discovery through 2032, covering 49 European territories. Unlike the previous contract where corporate precursor Discovery, Inc. was responsible for sublicensing them to broadcasters in each country, free-to-air rights packages were concurrently awarded to the European Broadcasting Union (EBU) and its members, where each broadcaster would carry at least 200 hours of coverage of the 2028 Summer Olympics. On October 6, the boardcast rights folded into Skydance Global Sports Group as result of merging between Warner Bros. Discovery and Paramount Skydance.

Territory	Rights holder	Ref
Afghanistan	ATN	
Albania	RTSH	
Australia	Nine	
Austria	ORF	
Belgium	RTBF; VRT	
Brazil	Grupo Globo; CazéTV	
Bulgaria	BNT	
Canada	CBC/Radio Canada	
Central and Southeast Asia	Infront Sports & Media (Note: Rights to be sold to local broadcasters)	
Chile	Chilevisión	
China	CMG	
Croatia	HRT	
Czech Republic	ČT	
Denmark	DR, TV 2	
Estonia	ERR	
Europe (Note: except Belarus and Russia)	EBU; Skydance Global Sports Group	
Finland	Yle	
France	France Télévisions	
Georgia	GPB	
Germany	ARD; ZDF	
Greece	ERT	
Hungary	MTVA	
Iceland	RÚV	
Ireland	RTÉ	
Israel	Sports Channel	
Italy	RAI	
Japan	Japan Consortium	
Kosovo	RTK	
Latin America (Note: Except Brazil)	América Móvil	
Latvia	LTV	
Liechtenstein	SRG SSR	
Lithuania	LRT	
Mexico	TelevisaUnivision	
Middle East and North Africa	beIN Sports	
Mongolia	NTV	
Montenegro	RTCG	
Netherlands	NOS	
New Zealand	Sky	
Norway	NRK	
Paraguay	ABC TV	
Poland	TVP	
Portugal	RTP	
San Marino	RAI	
Slovakia	STVR	
Slovenia	RTV	
Sub-Saharan Africa	Marketing & Media Solutions	
Spain	RTVE	
Sweden	SVT	
Switzerland	SRG SSR	
Ukraine	Suspilne	
United Kingdom	BBC	
United States	NBCUniversal; Versant	
