= Broadcasting contracts in cricket =

This article covers cricket broadcasting rights. For a list of sports broadcasting rights by countries, see list of sports television broadcast contracts.

In certain countries international cricket rights are protected and must be broadcast live and free-to-air.

== Protected TV rights ==
=== India ===
The content rights holder is required to share the feed with national broadcaster Doordarshan for "Sports events of National importance". Doordarshan can broadcast the game only on terrestrial TV and its own direct to home platform. They are not permitted to share these signals with cable operators and other DTH providers. As of 2017 all official one-day international, Twenty20 and test matches played by the Indian men's cricket team, semifinals and finals of the men's World Cup and International Cricket Council Championship Trophy are considered as cricketing events of “national importance”.

=== Australia ===
An anti-siphoning list gives the free-to-air broadcasters the first right to negotiate. For cricket, it includes all Test matches Australia plays at home or in England, home ODIs and home T20 internationals. It also includes Australia's matches in the World Cup or World T20 when played at home, and the final of any tournament hosted in Australia or New Zealand.

=== United Kingdom ===
Test matches involving the English national team and world cup matches involving home nations as well as semi-finals and finals are included in the category B list of the Ofcom Code on Sports and Other Listed and Designated Events. Category B events are allowed to be broadcast on pay TV provided there is adequate secondary coverage in the form of highlights and delayed broadcasts.

== Primary rights sale ==
Various cricket boards and the ICC often sell the rights first to a primary broadcaster who may later resell those rights to other streaming or broadcast partners in territories where the original broadcaster has no presence. For example, Star Sports bought the global rights for IPL in all territories and all platforms from BCCI and later resold these rights to Sky Sports for the UK market.

Broadcasting Contracts for Cricket (Television)
Event	Broadcaster	Rights Details
ICC Events	Star Sports and JioHotstar	Global audio visual rights for all events organized by ICC for 8-year period 2015–2023. Starts after 2015 World cup. Camera, Commentary and the whole production rights are retained by ICC and taken care by an umbrella organisation called ICC TV.
English Cricket Domestic Rights	Sky Sports BBC Sport (Highlights)	UK and Ireland rights on all platforms for all games organized by ECB including International, Domestic and T20 League for 5-year period 2020–24
Indian Cricket Domestic Rights	Star Sports and JioHotstar (All matches) DD Sports (Only ODI and T20I matches)	All International and Domestic matches organized by BCCI for 5 year period 2023-2028.
Indian Premier League	Star Sports and JioHotstar (Internet)	Indian rights for all IPL matches for the 5-year period 2023–2027.
Australian Cricket Domestic Rights	Channel 7 (only test matches and Big Bash League) and Fox Cricket (all matches and Big Bash League)	Australian rights for all Cricket organized by CA including International, Domestic and Big Bash League for 6-year period 2018–2024.
South African Cricket Domestic Rights	Supersport	Rights for all cricket organized by CSA from May 2015 through April 2021
Pakistani Cricket Domestic Rights	PTV Sports	All International & Domestic Cricket Matches in Pakistan organized by PCB from 2020 to 2023 for Broadcast in Pakistan (does not include Pakistan Super League) Daraz obtained the rights for live streaming Pakistan vs New Zealand and all other upcoming Pakistan series in 2021.
Pakistan Super League	PTV Sports, Ten Sports and A Sports	
West Indian Cricket Domestic Rights	Flow Sports, Goldmines TV	
New Zealand Cricket Domestic Rights	TVNZ	The broadcast rights moved from Spark Sport to TVNZ in July 2023. Spark Sport was the official broadcaster from April 2020 until July 2023.
Sri Lankan Cricket Domestic Rights	Sony Pictures Networks India	
Bangladeshi Cricket Domestic Rights	GTV, T Sports	
Bangladesh Premier League	GTV, Maasranga Television, Enterr 10 Television Network and Rabbithole Sports	Channel 9 was the official broadcaster From 2012 to 2016. Later on, GTV and Maasranga Television bought the right to broadcast on Satellite TV. Rabbithole Sports were also digitally live streaming all the matches. Enterr 10 TV Network
Zimbabwe Cricket Domestic Rights	Total Sports Management	Rights for all home cricket series of Zimbabwe Cricket for the period of 2015-2023.
