= Sports broadcasting contracts in India =

Sports broadcasting contracts in India include:

== Multi-Sport events ==
=== Domestic competitions ===
List of current broadcasters:

Federation (or) Confederation	Competition	Period	Television Rights		Streaming Rights	
Federation (or) Confederation	Competition	Period	Conglomerate	Channel(s)	Conglomerate	Platform
Indian Olympic Association	National Games of India	2025	Doordarshan	DD Sports	Olympics	Olympics
Sports Authority of India	Khelo India Winter Games	2025	Doordarshan	DD Sports	Olympics	Olympics
Sports Authority of India	Khelo India Youth Games	2025	Doordarshan	DD Sports	Doordarshan	Prasar Bharati
Sports Authority of India	Khelo India University Games	2024	Doordarshan	DD Sports	Doordarshan	Prasar Bharati
Sports Authority of India	Khelo India Para Games	2025	Doordarshan	DD Sports	Doordarshan	Prasar Bharati
Sports Authority of India	Khelo India Beach Games	2025	Doordarshan	DD Sports	Doordarshan	Prasar Bharati

=== International competitions ===
List of current broadcasters:

Federation (or) Confederation	Competition	Period	Television Rights		Streaming Rights	
Federation (or) Confederation	Competition	Period	Conglomerate	Channel(s)	Conglomerate	Platform
International Olympic Committee	Summer Olympics	2024	JioStar	Star Sports	JioStar	JioHotstar
International Olympic Committee	Winter Olympics	2026	None		JioStar	JioHotstar
International Paralympic Committee	Summer Paralympics	2024	None		JioStar	JioHotstar
International Paralympic Committee	Winter Paralympics	2026	None		JioStar	JioHotstar
Commonwealth Games Federation	Commonwealth Games	2026	Culver Max Entertainment	Sony Sports Network	Culver Max Entertainment	Sony LIV
Olympic Council of Asia	Asian Games	2026	Culver Max Entertainment	Sony Sports Network	Culver Max Entertainment	Sony LIV
Olympic Council of Asia	Asian Winter Games	2025	None		Asian Games	Asian Games Hub
Asian Paralympic Committee	Asian Para Games	2026	Doordarshan	DD Sports	Doordarshan	Waves
South Asia Olympic Council	South Asian Games	2019	None			

Note: The bid for the television rights for the period of 2026-2032 Olympics is currently underway for the Indian subcontinent.

== American Football ==
=== International competitions ===
List of current broadcasters:

Competition	Period	Television Rights		Streaming Rights	
Competition	Period	Conglomerate	Channel(s)	Conglomerate	Platform
National Football League	2023-2033	None		DAZN	DAZN

== Archery ==
=== International competitions ===
List of current broadcasters:

Federation (or) Confederation	Competition	Period	Television Rights		Streaming Rights	
Federation (or) Confederation	Competition	Period	Conglomerate	Channel(s)	Conglomerate	Platform
World Archery	Archery World Cup	2025	None		World Archery	archery+
World Archery	World Archery Championships	2025	None		World Archery	archery+

== Association Football ==
=== Domestic competitions ===
==== Domestic state football ====
List of current broadcasters:

Competition	Period	Television rights		Streaming rights	
Competition	Period	Conglomerate	Channel(s)	Conglomerate	Platform
Santosh Trophy	2025–26	None		AIFF	FIFA+
Senior Women's NFC	2025–26	None		AIFF	YouTube
National Beach Soccer Championship	2023	None		AIFF	YouTube

==== Domestic club football ====
List of current broadcasters:

Competition	Period	Television rights		Streaming rights	
Competition	Period	Conglomerate	Channel(s)	Conglomerate	Platform
Indian Super League	2026-27	Culver Max Entertainment	Sony Sports Network	Sony Pictures Networks Google	Sony LIV YouTube
Indian Football League	2026-27	Zee Entertainment Enterprises & Doordarshan			
Indian Football League	2026-27	Zee Entertainment Enterprises & Doordarshan	DD Sports; Unite8 Sports	Zee Entertainment Enterprises & Doordarshan	ZEE5; Waves; YouTube
I-League 2	2025-26	None		AIFF	YouTube
I-League 3	2026-27	None		AIFF	YouTube
Indian Women's League	2026-27	None		AIFF	YouTube
Indian Women's League 2	2026-27	None		Dravstream Technologies Private Limited	SportVot
Super Cup	2025	JioStar	Star Sports	JioStar	JioHotstar
Durand Cup	2025-27	Culver Max Entertainment	Sony Sports Network	Culver Max Entertainment	Sony LIV
Futsal Club Championship	2026	None		AIFF	YouTube

==== Domestic state football competition ====
===== Leagues =====
List of current broadcasters:

State	League	Period	Television rights		Streaming rights	
State	League	Period	Conglomerate	Channel(s)	Conglomerate	Platform
West Bengal	Calcutta Football League	2026	None		Number 10 Sports Private Limited	No.10 Sports

===== Franchise leagues =====
List of current broadcasters:

State	Competition	Period	Television rights		Streaming rights	
State	Competition	Period	Conglomerate	Channel(s)	Conglomerate	Platform
Arunachal Pradesh	Arunachal Super League	2026	None		JioStar	JioHotstar
Kerala	Super League Kerala	2026	Zee Entertainment Enterprises	Unite8 Sports	Zee Entertainment Enterprises	ZEE5
Gujarat	Gujarat Super League	2026	None		GSFA	YouTube
West Bengal	Bengal Super League	2025-2035	Zee Entertainment Enterprises	Zee Bangla Sonar	Zee Entertainment Enterprises	ZEE5

=== International competitions ===
==== International football (Home) ====
List of current broadcasters:

Competition	Period	Television rights		Streaming rights	
Competition	Period	Conglomerate	Channel(s)	Conglomerate	Platform
Intercontinental Cup	2024	JioStar	Star Sports	JioStar	JioHotstar
Tri-Nation Series	2023	JioStar	Star Sports	JioStar	JioHotstar
Gold Cup		TBD			

==== International football (Away) ====
List of current broadcasters:

Federation (or) Confederation	Competition	Period	Television Rights		Streaming Rights	
Federation (or) Confederation	Competition	Period	Conglomerate	Channel(s)	Conglomerate	Platform
FIFA	FIFA World Cup	2026-2034	Zee Entertainment Enterprises Limited	Unite8 Sports (India), Zee Cinema, Zee Keralam, Zee Bangla Sonar	Zee Entertainment Enterprises Limited	ZEE5
FIFA	FIFA U-20 World Cup	2026-2034	Zee Entertainment Enterprises Limited	Unite8 Sports (India)	Zee Entertainment Enterprises Limited	ZEE5
FIFA	FIFA U-17 World Cup	2026-2034	Zee Entertainment Enterprises Limited	Unite8 Sports (India)	Zee Entertainment Enterprises Limited	ZEE5
FIFA	FIFA Women's World Cup	2026-2034	Zee Entertainment Enterprises Limited	Unite8 Sports (India)	Zee Entertainment Enterprises Limited	ZEE5
FIFA	FIFA U-20 Women's World Cup	2026-2034	Zee Entertainment Enterprises Limited	Unite8 Sports (India)	Zee Entertainment Enterprises Limited	ZEE5
FIFA	FIFA U-17 Women's World Cup	2026-2034	Zee Entertainment Enterprises Limited	Unite8 Sports (India)	Zee Entertainment Enterprises Limited	ZEE5
AFC	AFC Asian Cup	2027	None		Dream Sports	FanCode
AFC	AFC Asian Cup qualifiers	2025	JioStar	Star Sports	JioStar	JioHotstar
AFC	FIFA World Cup Qualifiers – AFC	2024	None		Dream Sports	FanCode
AFC	AFC U-23 Asian Cup	2026-28	None		Dream Sports	FanCode
AFC	AFC U-20 Asian Cup	2025-27	None		Dream Sports	FanCode
AFC	AFC U-17 Asian Cup	2025-27	None		Dream Sports	FanCode
AFC	AFC Women's Asian Cup	2026	None		Dream Sports	FanCode
AFC	AFC Women's Asian Cup qualifiers	2025	None		Thai Women’s Football Facebook Page, Changsuek Official	
AFC	AFC Women's Olympic Qualifying Tournament	2028	None		Dream Sports	FanCode
AFC	AFC U-20 Women's Asian Cup	2025-27	None		Dream Sports	FanCode
AFC	AFC U-17 Women's Asian Cup	2026-28	None		Dream Sports	FanCode
SAFF	SAFF Championship	2026	None		India TV	VETO
SAFF	SAFF U-20 Championship	2025	None		Sportzworkz	
SAFF	SAFF U-17 Championship	2025	None		Sportzworkz	
SAFF	SAFF Women's Championship	2026	None		Dream Sports	FanCode
SAFF	SAFF U-20 Women's Championship	2025	None		Sportzworkz	
SAFF	SAFF U-19 Women's Championship	2026	None		Sportzworkz	
UEFA	UEFA Euro	2023-28	Culver Max Entertainment	Sony Sports	Culver Max Entertainment	SonyLIV
UEFA	UEFA Nations League	2023-28	Culver Max Entertainment	Sony Sports	Culver Max Entertainment	SonyLIV
UEFA	UEFA Euro Qualifiers	2023-28	Culver Max Entertainment	Sony Sports	Culver Max Entertainment	SonyLIV
UEFA	FIFA World Cup Qualifiers – UEFA	2025-26	Culver Max Entertainment	Sony Sports	Culver Max Entertainment	SonyLIV
UEFA	UEFA Women's Euro	2025	None		Dream Sports	FanCode
CONMEBOL	Copa América	2024	None		Dream Sports	FanCode
CONMEBOL	FIFA World Cup Qualifiers – CONMEBOL	2025	None		Dream Sports	FanCode
CAF	Africa Cup of Nations	2023	None		Dream Sports	FanCode
CAF	FIFA World Cup Qualifiers – CAF	2023-25	None		Dream Sports	FanCode
CONCACAF	CONCACAF Gold Cup	2025	None		Dream Sports	FanCode
CONCACAF	FIFA World Cup Qualifiers – CONCACAF	2021-22	None		Dream Sports	FanCode

==== International club football ====
List of current broadcasters:

Country (or) Confederation	Competition	Period	Television Rights		Streaming Rights	
Country (or) Confederation	Competition	Period	Conglomerate	Channel(s)	Conglomerate	Platform
FIFA	FIFA Club World Cup	2025	WBD India	Eurosport India	Dream Sports	FanCode
FIFA	FIFA Club World Cup	2025	WBD India	Eurosport India	Access Industries	DAZN
FIFA	FIFA Intercontinental Cup	2026-2034	Zee Entertainment Enterprises	Unite8 Sports (India)	Zee Entertainment Enterprises	ZEE5
AFC	AFC Champions League Elite	2025-29	None		Dream Sports	FanCode
AFC	AFC Champions League Two	2025-29	None		Dream Sports	FanCode
AFC	AFC Challenge League	2026-27	None		AFC Hub	
AFC	AFC Women's Champions League	2024-29	None		Dream Sports	FanCode
UEFA	UEFA Champions League	2023-28	Culver Max Entertainment	Sony Sports	Culver Max Entertainment	SonyLIV
UEFA	UEFA Europa League	2023-28	Culver Max Entertainment	Sony Sports	Culver Max Entertainment	SonyLIV
UEFA	UEFA Europa Conference League	2023-28	Culver Max Entertainment	Sony Sports	Culver Max Entertainment	SonyLIV
UEFA	UEFA Super Cup	2023-28	Culver Max Entertainment	Sony Sports	Culver Max Entertainment	SonyLIV
UEFA	UEFA Women's Champions League	2025-27	None		Dream Sports	FanCode
CONCACAF	CONCACAF Champions Cup	2025	None		Dream Sports	FanCode
CONCACAF	Leagues Cup	2023	None		Apple	Apple TV+ (MLS Season Pass)
England	Premier League	2025-28	JioStar	Star Sports	JioStar	JioHotstar
England	FA Cup	2025-26	Culver Max Entertainment	Sony Sports	Culver Max Entertainment	SonyLIV
England	FA Community Shield	2024-25	Culver Max Entertainment	Sony Sports	Culver Max Entertainment	SonyLIV
England	EFL Cup	2024-25	None		Dream Sports	FanCode
England	EFL Championship	2024-25	None		Dream Sports	FanCode
England	EFL League One	2024-25	None		Dream Sports	FanCode
England	EFL League Two	2024-25	None		Dream Sports	FanCode
England	Women's Super League	2022-24	None		Dream Sports	FanCode
France	Ligue 1	2026–27	JioStar	Star Sports	JioStar	JioHotstar
France	Ligue 2		None		None	
France	Coupe de France	2024	None		Access Industries	DAZN
Germany	Bundesliga	2026-2031	Zee Entertainment Enterprises	Unite8 Sports (India)	Zee Entertainment Enterprises	ZEE5
Germany	DFB-Pokal	2026-27	None		Dream Sports	FanCode
Italy	Serie A	2026-2031	Zee Entertainment Enterprises	Unite8 Sports (India)	Zee Entertainment Enterprises	ZEE5
Italy	Coppa Italia	2026-2031	Zee Entertainment Enterprises	Unite8 Sports (India)	Zee Entertainment Enterprises	ZEE5
Italy	Supercoppa Italiana	2026-2031	Zee Entertainment Enterprises	Unite8 Sports (India)	Zee Entertainment Enterprises	ZEE5
Netherlands	Eredivisie	2025-2030	WBD India	Eurosport India	WBD India	Discovery+
Scotland	Scottish Premiership	2025-2029	JioStar	Star Sports	JioStar	JioHotstar
Scotland	Scottish League Cup	2025-2029	JioStar	Star Sports	JioStar	JioHotstar
Scotland	Scottish Championship	2025-2029	JioStar	Star Sports	JioStar	JioHotstar
Spain	La Liga	2024-30	None		Dream Sports	FanCode
Spain	Segunda Division	2026-30	None		Dream Sports	FanCode
Spain	Copa del Rey	2024-27	None		Dream Sports	FanCode
Spain	Supercopa de España	2024-25	None		Dream Sports	FanCode
Spain	Liga F	2022-27	None		Access Industries	DAZN, DAZN Women's Football
China	Chinese Super League	2025	None		Dream Sports	FanCode
Japan	J1 League	2025	None		Dream Sports	FanCode
Australia	A-League Men	2024-25	None		Dream Sports	FanCode
Saudi Arabia	Saudi Pro League	2025-29	None		Dream Sports	FanCode
Saudi Arabia	King Cup	2024-25	Culver Max Entertainment	Sony Sports Network	Culver Max Entertainment	SonyLIV
Saudi Arabia	Saudi Super Cup	2024	Culver Max Entertainment	Sony Sports Network	Culver Max Entertainment	SonyLIV
United States	Major League Soccer	2025	WBD India	Eurosport India	Apple	Apple TV+ (MLS Season Pass)
United States	U.S. Open Cup	2026	None		Dream Sports	FanCode

== Athletics ==
=== Domestic competitions ===
List of current broadcasters:

Competition	Period	Television Rights		Streaming Rights	
Competition	Period	Conglomerate	Channel(s)	Conglomerate	Platform
Neeraj Chopra Classic	2025	JioStar	Star Sports	JioStar	JioHotstar

=== International competitions ===
List of current broadcasters:

Federation (or) Confederation	Competition	Period	Television Rights		Streaming Rights	
Federation (or) Confederation	Competition	Period	Conglomerate	Channel(s)	Conglomerate	Platform
World Athletics	World Athletics Championships	2023	JioStar	Star Sports	JioStar	JioHotstar
World Athletics	Diamond League	2023-24	JioStar	Star Sports	JioStar	JioHotstar
World Athletics	World Athletics Continental Tour	2024	JioStar	Star Sports	JioStar	JioHotstar
Asian Athletics Association	Asian Athletics Championships	2025	None		STN SPORTS	

== Badminton ==
=== Domestic competitions ===
List of current broadcasters:

Federation (or) Confederation	Competition	Period	Television Rights		Streaming Rights	
Federation (or) Confederation	Competition	Period	Conglomerate	Channel(s)	Conglomerate	Platform
Badminton Association of India	Premier Badminton League	2020-25	JioStar	Star Sports	JioStar	JioHotstar

=== International competitions ===
List of current broadcasters:

Federation (or) Confederation	Competition	Period	Television Rights		Streaming Rights	
Federation (or) Confederation	Competition	Period	Conglomerate	Channel(s)	Conglomerate	Platform
Badminton World Federation	Grade 1 (S-Tier)					
Badminton World Federation	BWF World Championships	2023	JioStar	Star Sports	JioStar	JioHotstar
Badminton World Federation	Thomas Cup	2022	JioStar	Star Sports	JioStar	JioHotstar
Badminton World Federation	Uber Cup	2022	JioStar	Star Sports	JioStar	JioHotstar
Badminton World Federation	Sudirman Cup	2023	JioStar	Star Sports	JioStar	JioHotstar
Badminton World Federation	Grade 2 (A-Tier)					
Badminton World Federation	BWF World Tour Finals	2022	JioStar	Star Sports	JioStar	JioHotstar
Badminton World Federation	BWF World Tour	2023	JioStar	Star Sports	JioStar	JioHotstar
Badminton World Federation	India Open	2026-28	WBD India	Eurosport India	Dream Sports	FanCode
Badminton World Federation	Syed Modi International Badminton Championships	2024	Doordarshan	DD Sports	Jio Platforms	JioTV
Badminton Asia	Badminton Asia Championships	2024-25	Culver Max Entertainment	Sony Sports Network	Culver Max Entertainment	Sony LIV
Badminton Asia	Badminton Asia Team Championships	2024	Culver Max Entertainment	Sony Sports Network	Culver Max Entertainment	Sony LIV
Badminton Asia	Badminton Asia Mixed Team Championships	2023	Culver Max Entertainment	Sony Sports Network	Culver Max Entertainment	Sony LIV

== Baseball ==
=== International competitions ===
List of current broadcasters:

Competition	Period	Television Rights		Streaming Rights	
Competition	Period	Conglomerate	Network	Conglomerate	Platform
Baseball United	2025	Zee Entertainment Enterprises	Unite8 Sports (India)	Zee Entertainment Enterprises	ZEE5

== Basketball ==
=== Domestic competitions ===
List of current broadcasters:

Federation (or) Confederation	Competition	Period	Television Rights		Streaming Rights	
Federation (or) Confederation	Competition	Period	Conglomerate	Channel(s)	Conglomerate	Platform
Basketball Federation of India	Indian National Basketball League	2025	Culver Max Entertainment	Sony Sports Network	Culver Max Entertainment	Sony LIV

=== International competitions ===
==== International basketball (Away) ====
List of current broadcasters:

Federation (or) Confederation	Competition	Period	Television Rights		Streaming Rights	
Federation (or) Confederation	Competition	Period	Conglomerate	Channel(s)	Conglomerate	Platform
FIBA	FIBA Basketball World Cup	2023	None		Dream11	FanCode
FIBA	FIBA Women's Basketball World Cup	2022	None			
FIBA Asia	FIBA Asia Cup	2023	None		Dream11	FanCode
FIBA Asia	FIBA Women's Asia Cup	2025	None		FIBA	FIBA Basketball

==== International club basketball ====
List of current broadcasters:

Competition	Period	Television Rights		Streaming Rights	
Competition	Period	Conglomerate	Channel(s)	Conglomerate	Platform
EuroLeague	2022-25	None		Dream Sports	FanCode
National Basketball Association	2025	None		Amazon	Amazon Prime Video

=== International competitions ===
List of current broadcasters:

Federation (or) Confederation	Competition	Period	Television Rights		Streaming Rights	
Federation (or) Confederation	Competition	Period	Conglomerate	Channel(s)	Conglomerate	Platform
World Boxing	World Boxing Championships (Both Men's and Women's)	2025	None		Eurovision	Eurovision Sport
World Boxing	World Boxing Cup (Both Men's and Women's)	2025	None		World Boxing	World Boxing
World Boxing	World Boxing U19 Championships (Both Men's and Women's)	2024	None		World Boxing	World Boxing
International Boxing Association	IBA Men's World Boxing Championships	2023	None		Dream11	FanCode
International Boxing Association	IBA Women's World Boxing Championships	2023	Doordarshan	DD Sports	Doordarshan	Prasar Bharati
International Boxing Association	IBA Women's World Boxing Championships	2023	Culver Max Entertainment	Sony Sports Network	Culver Max Entertainment	Sony LIV

== Cricket ==
=== Domestic competitions ===
==== Domestic franchise cricket ====
List of current broadcasters:

Competition	Period	Television Rights		Streaming Rights	
Competition	Period	Conglomerate	Network	Conglomerate	Platform
Indian Premier League	2023–2027	JioStar	Star Sports	JioStar	JioHotstar
Women's Premier League	2023–2027	JioStar	Star Sports	JioStar	JioHotstar

==== Domestic State/Zonal cricket ====
List of current broadcasters:

Competition		Period	Television Rights		Streaming Rights	
Competition		Period	Conglomerate	Network	Conglomerate	Platform
First Class Cricket	Ranji Trophy	2023–2028	JioStar	Star Sports	JioStar	JioHotstar
First Class Cricket	Irani Cup	2023–2028	JioStar	Star Sports	JioStar	JioHotstar
First Class Cricket	Duleep Trophy	2023–2028	JioStar	Star Sports	JioStar	JioHotstar
First Class Cricket	Senior Women's Inter Zonal Multi-Day Trophy	2023–2028	JioStar	Star Sports	JioStar	JioHotstar
List A Cricket	Vijay Hazare Trophy	2023–2028	JioStar	Star Sports	JioStar	JioHotstar
List A Cricket	Deodhar Trophy	2023–2028	JioStar	Star Sports	JioStar	JioHotstar
List A Cricket	Senior Women's One-Day Trophy	2023–2028	JioStar	Star Sports	JioStar	JioHotstar
List A Cricket	Senior Women's Inter Zonal One-Day Trophy	2023–2028	JioStar	Star Sports	JioStar	JioHotstar
T20 Cricket	Syed Mushtaq Ali Trophy	2023–2028	JioStar	Star Sports	JioStar	JioHotstar
T20 Cricket	Senior Women's T20 Trophy	2023–2028	JioStar	Star Sports	JioStar	JioHotstar
T20 Cricket	Senior Women's Inter Zonal T20 Trophy	2023–2028	JioStar	Star Sports	JioStar	JioHotstar

==== Domestic State franchise cricket ====
List of current broadcasters:

State	Competition	Period	Television Rights		Streaming Rights	
State	Competition	Period	Conglomerate	Network	Conglomerate	Platform
Bihar	Bihar Cricket League	2021	WBD India	Eurosport India	WBD India	Discovery+
Maharashtra (excluding Mumbai and Vidarbha)	Maharashtra Premier League	2025	JioStar	Star Sports	JioStar	JioHotstar
Maharashtra (excluding Mumbai and Vidarbha)	Women's Maharashtra Premier League	2025	JioStar	Star Sports	JioStar	JioHotstar
Mumbai (Note: It is not a state, but there is separate association for administrating cricket in Mumbai, Thane and Navi Mumbai of Maharashtra .)	T20 Mumbai	2025	JioStar	Star Sports	JioStar	JioHotstar
Andhra Pradesh	Andhra Premier League	2025	Culver Max Entertainment	Sony Sports Network	Dream Sports	FanCode
Vadodara (Note: It is not a state, but there is separate association for administrating cricket in Vadodara of Gujarat.)	Baroda Premier League	2025	JioStar	Star Sports	Dream Sports	FanCode
Kerala	Kerala Cricket League	2026	JioStar	Star Sports, Asianet Plus	JioStar	JioHotstar
Karnataka	Maharaja Trophy KSCA T20	2025	JioStar	Star Sports	Dream Sports	FanCode
Puducherry	Pondicherry Premier League	2025	JioStar	Star Sports	Dream Sports	FanCode
Punjab	Sher-E-Punjab T20 Cup	2026	Culver Max Entertainment	Sony Sports Network	Culver Max Entertainment	SonyLIV
Tamil Nadu	Tamil Nadu Premier League	2026	Culver Max Entertainment	Sony Sports Network	YouTube	YouTube
Rajasthan	Rajasthan Premier League	2023	WBD India	Eurosport India	JioStar	JioHotstar
West Bengal	Bengal Pro T20 League	2025	JioStar	Star Sports	JioStar	JioHotstar
West Bengal	Women's Bengal Pro T20 League	2025	JioStar	Star Sports	JioStar	JioHotstar
Delhi	Delhi Premier League T20	2026	JioStar	Star Sports	JioStar	JioHotstar
Delhi	Women's Delhi Premier League T20	2026	JioStar	Star Sports	JioStar	JioHotstar
Madhya Pradesh	Madhya Pradesh League	2025	JioStar	Star Sports	Dream Sports	FanCode
Madhya Pradesh	Women's Madhya Pradesh League	2025	JioStar	Star Sports	Dream Sports	FanCode
Jharkhand	Jharkhand T20 League	2026	Doordarshan	DD Sports	JioStar, Dream Sports, Prasar Bharati	JioHotstar, Fancode, Waves
Saurashtra (Note: It is not a state, but there is separate association for administrating cricket in Saurashtra of Gujarat.)	Saurashtra Pro T20 League	2025	Doordarshan	DD Sports	JioStar, Dream Sports, Prasar Bharati	JioHotstar, Fancode, Waves
Vidarbha (Note: It is not a state, but there is separate association for administrating cricket in Vidarbha of Maharashtra.)	Vidarbha Pro T20 League	2025	Doordarshan	DD Sports	JioStar, Dream Sports, Prasar Bharati	JioHotstar, Fancode, Waves
Uttar Pradesh	UP T20 League	2025	Culver Max Entertainment	Sony Sports Network	Culver Max Entertainment	SonyLIV
Chhattisgarh	Chhattisgarh Cricket Premier League	2025	Culver Max Entertainment	Sony Sports Network	Culver Max Entertainment	SonyLIV
Uttarakhand	Uttarakhand Premier League	2024	Culver Max Entertainment	Sony Sports Network	Dream11	FanCode
Uttarakhand	Uttarakhand Premier League	2024	Culver Max Entertainment	Sony Sports Network	Dream11	FanCode
Arunachal Pradesh	Arunachal Premier League	2024	None		Dream11	FanCode
Odisha	Odisha Cricket League	2023	None		Dream11	FanCode

=== International competitions ===
==== International Cricket (Home) ====
List of current broadcasters:

Competition	Period	Television Rights		Streaming Rights	
Competition	Period	Conglomerate	Network	Conglomerate	Platform
International Cricket In India	2023–2028	JioStar	Star Sports DD Sports (FTA)	JioStar	JioHotstar

==== International Cricket (Away) ====
List of current broadcasters:

Competition	Period	Television Rights		Streaming Rights	
Competition	Period	Conglomerate	Network	Conglomerate	Platform
International Cricket Council	2024–2027	JioStar	Star Sports DD Sports (FTA) (All TEST, ODI and T20I matches of India including Semi-Finals and Final)	JioStar	JioHotstar
International Cricket in South Africa	2024–2031	JioStar	Star Sports DD Sports (FTA) (All TEST, ODI and T20I matches of India including Semi-Finals and Final)	JioStar	JioHotstar
International Cricket in Australia	2023-2030	JioStar	Star Sports DD Sports (FTA) (All TEST, ODI and T20I matches of India including Semi-Finals and Final)	JioStar	JioHotstar
Asian Cricket Council	2024-2031	Sony Pictures Networks	Sony Sports Network DD Sports (FTA) (Only Test, ODIs and T20Is against India)	Sony Pictures Networks	SonyLIV
International Cricket in England	2022–2028	Sony Pictures Networks	Sony Sports Network DD Sports (FTA) (Only Test, ODIs and T20Is against India)	Sony Pictures Networks	SonyLIV
International Cricket in Ireland	2026	Sony Pictures Networks	Sony Sports Network DD Sports (FTA) (Only Test, ODIs and T20Is against India)	Sony Pictures Networks	SonyLIV
International Cricket in Sri Lanka	2023–2027	Sony Pictures Networks	Sony Sports Network DD Sports (FTA) (Only Test, ODIs and T20Is against India)	Sony Pictures Networks	SonyLIV
International Cricket in New Zealand	2024-2031 (Note: For the period of 2021 to 2026, no broadcaster initially held television rights. As noted in the citation, Sony Sports Network returned as the television broadcaster for the last two years of Amazon Prime Video's rights in 2024, holding exclusive television rights but "co-exclusive" for streaming rights.)	Sony Pictures Networks	Sony Sports Network DD Sports (FTA) (Only Test, ODIs and T20Is against India)	Sony Pictures Networks	SonyLIV
International Cricket in New Zealand	2021-2026	Sony Pictures Networks	Sony Sports Network DD Sports (FTA) (Only Test, ODIs and T20Is against India)	Sony Pictures Networks	SonyLIV
International Cricket in Zimbabwe	2026	Zee Entertainment Enterprises	Unite8 Sports (India) DD Sports (FTA) (Only Test, ODIs and T20Is against India)	Dream11	FanCode
(Cricket West Indies) International Cricket in West Indies	2021-2024	Prasar Bharati	DD Sports (FTA) (Only Test, ODIs and T20Is against India)	Dream11	FanCode
International Cricket in Bangladesh	2025	Prasar Bharati	DD Sports (FTA) (Only Test, ODIs and T20Is against India)	Dream11	FanCode
International Cricket in Pakistan	2026			Dot Republic Media	Sports TV (YouTube)
International Cricket in Afghanistan	2024-2027	WBD India	Eurosport India	Dream11	FanCode

==== International franchise cricket ====
List of current broadcasters:

Country (or) Confederation	Competition	Period	Television Rights		Streaming Rights	
Country (or) Confederation	Competition	Period	Conglomerate	Network	Conglomerate	Platform
Afghanistan	Afghanistan Premier League	2024-2027	WBD India	Eurosport India	WBD India	Discovery+
Australia	Big Bash League	2023–2030	JioStar	Star Sports	JioStar	JioHotstar
Australia	Women's Big Bash League	2023–2030	JioStar	Star Sports	JioStar	JioHotstar
Bangladesh	Bangladesh Premier League	2024-25	T Sports		Dream11	Fancode
Canada	Global T20 Canada	2024	JioStar	Star Sports	Dream11	Fancode
England	The Hundred	2026	JioStar	Star Sports	JioStar	JioHotstar
England	The Women's Hundred	2026	JioStar	Star Sports	JioStar	JioHotstar
Nepal	Nepal Premier League	2025	JioStar	Star Sports	Dream11	Fancode
Pakistan	Pakistan Super League	2025	Culver Max Entertainment	Sony Sports Network	Dream11	Fancode
South Africa	SA20	2023–2033	JioStar	Star Sports	JioStar	JioHotstar
Sri Lanka	Lanka Premier League	2026	JioStar	Star Sports	Dream11	FanCode
Sri Lanka	Lanka T10	2024	JioStar	Star Sports	Dream11	FanCode
United Arab Emirates	Abu Dhabi T10	2026	JioStar	Star Sports	JioStar	JioHotstar
United Arab Emirates	International League T20	2023–2032	Zee Entertainment Enterprises	Unite8 Sports (India)	Zee Entertainment Enterprises	ZEE5
United States	Major League Cricket	2026	JioStar	Star Sports	JioStar	JioHotstar
United States	US Masters T10	2024	JioStar	Star Sports	Dream11	FanCode
West Indies	Caribbean Premier League	2026	JioStar	Star Sports	Dream11	FanCode
West Indies	Women's Caribbean Premier League	2026	JioStar	Star Sports	Dream11	FanCode
West Indies	Global Super League	2025	Culver Max Entertainment	Sony Sports Network	Dream11	FanCode
Zimbabwe	Zim Afro T10	2024	JioStar	Star Sports	Dream11	FanCode

=== Other competitions ===
List of current broadcasters:

Competition	Period	Television Rights		Streaming Rights	
Competition	Period	Conglomerate	Network	Conglomerate	Platform
World Championship of Legends	2025	JioStar	Star Sports	Dream Sports	FanCode
Celebrity Cricket League	2025	Culver Max Entertainment	Sony Sports Network	JioStar	JioHotstar
International Masters League	2025	JioStar	Colors Cineplex, Colors Cineplex Superhits	JioStar	JioHotstar
Asian Legends League	2025	Culver Max Entertainment	Sony Sports Network	Dream Sports	FanCode
Legends League Cricket (T10)	2025	Doordarshan	DD Sports	Prasar Bharati	Waves
Indian Street Premier League	2026	JioStar	Star Sports	JioStar	JioHotstar
Hong Kong Sixes	2025	Culver Max Entertainment	Sony Sports Network	Dream Sports	FanCode
Max60 Caribbean	2025	Culver Max Entertainment	Sony Sports Network	Dream Sports	FanCode

== Cycling ==
=== International competitions ===
List of current broadcasters:

Competition	Period	Television Rights		Streaming Rights	
Competition	Period	Conglomerate	Channel(s)	Conglomerate	Platform
Grand Tour Tournaments
Tour de France	2025	WBD India	Eurosport India	Jio Platforms	JioTV
Giro d'Italia	2025	WBD India	Eurosport India	Jio Platforms	JioTV
Vuelta a España	2025	WBD India	Eurosport India	Jio Platforms	JioTV

== Golf ==
=== Domestic competitions ===
List of current broadcasters:

Federation (or) Confederation	Competition	Period	Television Rights		Streaming Rights	
Federation (or) Confederation	Competition	Period	Conglomerate	Network	Conglomerate	Platform
Indian Golf Union	Indian Open	2025	None		Dream Sports	FanCode

=== International competitions ===
List of current broadcasters:

Competition	Period	Television Rights		Streaming Rights	
Competition	Period	Conglomerate	Channel(s)	Conglomerate	Platform
Major Golf Championships
Masters Tournament	2025	None		Dream Sports	FanCode
PGA Championship	2025	None		Dream Sports	FanCode
U.S. Open	2025	None		Dream Sports	FanCode
The Open Championship	2025	None		Dream Sports	FanCode
Other Golf Championships
PGA Tour	2025	None		Dream Sports	FanCode
PGA European Tour	2026-28	Culver Max Entertainment	Sony Sports Network	Culver Max Entertainment	Sony LIV
LIV Golf	2026	Culver Max Entertainment	Sony Sports Network	Culver Max Entertainment	Sony LIV
Asian Tour	2025			Culver Max Entertainment	Sony LIV

== Handball ==
=== Domestic competitions ===
List of current broadcasters:

Federation (or) Confederation	Competition	Period	Television Rights		Streaming Rights	
Federation (or) Confederation	Competition	Period	Conglomerate	Network	Conglomerate	Platform
Handball Association of India	Premier Handball League	2023	JioStar	Star Sports	JioStar	JioHotstar
Handball Association of India	Premier Handball League	2023	JioStar	Star Sports	Dream Sports	FanCode

=== International competitions ===
List of current broadcasters:

Federation (or) Confederation	Competition	Period	Television Rights		Streaming Rights	
Federation (or) Confederation	Competition	Period	Conglomerate	Network	Conglomerate	Platform
Asian Handball Federation	Asian Women's Handball Championship	2024	Doordarshan	DD Sports	SportsCast India	

== Hockey ==
=== Domestic competitions ===
List of current broadcasters:

Federation (or) Confederation	Competition	Period	Television Rights		Streaming Rights	
Federation (or) Confederation	Competition	Period	Conglomerate	Network	Conglomerate	Platform
Hockey India	Hockey India League (Both Men's and Women's)	2024-27	Culver Max Entertainment	Sony Sports Network	Culver Max Entertainment	Sony LIV
Hockey India	Hockey India League (Both Men's and Women's)	2024-27	Doordarshan	DD Sports	Doordarshan	Waves

=== International competitions ===
List of current broadcasters:

Federation (or) Confederation	Competition	Period	Television Rights		Streaming Rights	
Federation (or) Confederation	Competition	Period	Conglomerate	Network	Conglomerate	Platform
International Hockey Federation	Men's FIH Hockey World Cup	2023–2027	JioStar	Star Sports	JioStar	JioHotstar
International Hockey Federation	Men's FIH Hockey Olympic Qualifiers	2023–2027	JioStar	Star Sports	JioStar	JioHotstar
International Hockey Federation	Men's FIH Pro League	2023–2027	JioStar	Star Sports	JioStar	JioHotstar
International Hockey Federation	Men's FIH Indoor Hockey World Cup	2023–2027	JioStar	Star Sports	JioStar	JioHotstar
International Hockey Federation	FIH Men's Hockey5s World Cup	2023–2027	JioStar	Star Sports	JioStar	JioHotstar
International Hockey Federation	Women's FIH Hockey World Cup	2023–2027	JioStar	Star Sports	JioStar	JioHotstar
International Hockey Federation	Women's FIH Hockey Olympic Qualifiers	2023–2027	JioStar	Star Sports	JioStar	JioHotstar
International Hockey Federation	Women's FIH Pro League	2023–2027	JioStar	Star Sports	JioStar	JioHotstar
International Hockey Federation	Women's FIH Indoor Hockey World Cup	2023–2027	JioStar	Star Sports	JioStar	JioHotstar
International Hockey Federation	FIH Women's Hockey5s World Cup	2023–2027	JioStar	Star Sports	JioStar	JioHotstar
International Hockey Federation	Men's FIH Hockey Junior World Cup	2023–2027	JioStar	Star Sports	JioStar	JioHotstar
International Hockey Federation	Women's FIH Hockey Junior World Cup	2023–2027	JioStar	Star Sports	JioStar	JioHotstar
Asian Hockey Federation	Women's Hockey Asia Cup	2025	None		FIH	Watch.hockey
Asian Hockey Federation	Men's Hockey Asia Cup	2025	Culver Max Entertainment	Sony Sports Network	Culver Max Entertainment	SonyLIV
Asian Hockey Federation	Men's Asian Champions Trophy	2026	JioStar	Star Sports	JioStar	JioHotstar
Asian Hockey Federation	Women's Asian Champions Trophy	2026	JioStar	Star Sports	JioStar	JioHotstar

== Kabaddi ==
=== Domestic competitions ===
==== Domestic franchise kabaddi ====
List of current broadcasters:

Competition	Period	Television Rights		Streaming Rights	
Competition	Period	Conglomerate	Network	Conglomerate	Platform
Pro Kabaddi League	2021-25	JioStar	Star Sports	JioStar	JioHotstar
Women's Kabaddi League	2023	WBD India	Eurosport India	WBD India	Discovery+

==== Domestic State franchise kabaddi ====
List of current broadcasters:

State	Competition	Period	Television Rights		Streaming Rights	
State	Competition	Period	Conglomerate	Network	Conglomerate	Platform
Haryana	Kabaddi Champions League	2026	Prasar Bharati	DD Sports	Prasar Bharati	Waves OTT
Haryana	Kabaddi Champions League	2026	Zee Entertainment Enterprises	Anmol TV, Z Bollywood, &Pictures, Zee Yuva, Zee Punjabi	Zee Entertainment Enterprises	ZEE5
Uttar Pradesh	Uttar Pradesh Kabaddi League	2025	Zee Entertainment Enterprises	Zee Bollywood, &Pictures HD, Anmol Cinema 2	Zee Entertainment Enterprises	ZEE5

=== International competitions ===
List of current broadcasters:

Federation (or) Confederation	Competition	Period	Television Rights		Streaming Rights	
Federation (or) Confederation	Competition	Period	Conglomerate	Network	Conglomerate	Platform
International Kabaddi Federation	Kabaddi World Cup	2016	JioStar	Star Sports	JioStar	JioHotstar
International Kabaddi Federation	Women's Kabaddi World Cup	2025	TBD			
World Kabaddi	Kabaddi World Cup	2025	Doordarshan	DD Sports	Olympics	Olympics
World Kabaddi	Women's Kabaddi World Cup	2025	Doordarshan	DD Sports	Olympics	Olympics
Asian Kabaddi Federation	Asian Kabaddi Championship	2023	None		Asian Kabaddi Championship	Asian Kabaddi Championship
Asian Kabaddi Federation	Women's Asian Kabaddi Championship	2025	None			

== Kickboxing ==
=== International competitions ===
List of current broadcasters:

Competition	Period	Television Rights		Streaming Rights	
Competition	Period	Conglomerate	Network	Conglomerate	Platform
King of Kings	2022-25	None		Access Industries	DAZN

== Kho Kho ==
=== Domestic competitions ===
List of current broadcasters:

Federation (or) Confederation	Competition	Period	Television Rights		Streaming Rights	
Federation (or) Confederation	Competition	Period	Conglomerate	Network	Conglomerate	Platform
Kho Kho Federation of India	Ultimate Kho Kho	2022-26	Culver Max Entertainment	Sony Sports Network	Culver Max Entertainment	SonyLIV

=== International competitions ===
List of current broadcasters:

Federation (or) Confederation	Competition	Period	Television Rights		Streaming Rights	
Federation (or) Confederation	Competition	Period	Conglomerate	Network	Conglomerate	Platform
International Kho Kho Federation	Kho Kho World Cup	2025	JioStar	Star Sports	JioStar	JioHotstar
International Kho Kho Federation	Kho Kho World Cup	2025	Doordarshan	DD Sports	JioStar	JioHotstar

== Mixed Martial Arts ==
=== International competitions ===
List of current broadcasters:

Competition	Period	Television Rights		Streaming Rights	
Competition	Period	Conglomerate	Network	Conglomerate	Platform
UFC	2024-28	Culver Max Entertainment	Sony Sports Network	Culver Max Entertainment	SonyLIV
ONE Championship	2025	JioStar	Star Sports	JioStar	JioHotstar
Professional Fighters League	2025	WBD India	Eurosport India	WBD India	Discovery+
Oktagon MMA	2023	None		Access Industries	DAZN
Bushido MMA	2023-2025	None		Access Industries	DAZN

== Motorsport ==
=== Domestic competitions ===
List of current broadcasters:

Competition	Period	Television Rights		Streaming Rights	
Competition	Period	Conglomerate	Network	Conglomerate	Platform
Indian Racing League	2025	None		Dream Sports	FanCode

=== International competitions ===
List of current broadcasters:

Competition	Period	Television Rights		Streaming Rights	
Competition	Period	Conglomerate	Network	Conglomerate	Platform
Formula One	2024-28	None		Dream Sports	FanCode
Formula Two	2024-28	None		Dream Sports	FanCode
Formula Three	2024-28	None		Dream Sports	FanCode
F1 Academy	2024-25	None		Dream Sports	FanCode
F1 Academy	2024-25	None		F1 Academy	F1 Academy
Formula E	2024	Culver Max Entertainment	Sony Sports Network	Culver Max Entertainment	SonyLIV
FIM Supercross World Championship	2025	Culver Max Entertainment	Sony Sports Network	Culver Max Entertainment	SonyLIV
Extreme H	2026-28	Culver Max Entertainment	Sony Sports Network	Culver Max Entertainment	SonyLIV
MotoGP	2025-26	WBD India	Eurosport India	Dream Sports	FanCode
FIA World Endurance Championship	2024	WBD India	Eurosport India	None	
Deutsche Tourenwagen Masters	2025	None		Dream Sports	FanCode

== Padel ==
=== Domestic competitions ===
List of current broadcasters:

Competition	Period	Television Rights		Streaming Rights	
Competition	Period	Conglomerate	Network	Conglomerate	Platform
World Padel League	2025	Zee Entertainment Enterprises	Zee Café, &Flix, and Zee Zest	Dream Sports	FanCode

== Pickleball ==
=== Domestic competitions ===
List of current broadcasters:

Competition	Period	Television Rights		Streaming Rights	
Competition	Period	Conglomerate	Network	Conglomerate	Platform
World Pickleball League	2026	WBD India	Eurosport India	Culver Max Entertainment	Sony LIV
Global Sports Pickleball	2025	Zee Entertainment Enterprises	Unite8 Sports (India)	Zee Entertainment Enterprises	ZEE5

== Rugby ==
=== Domestic competitions ===
List of current broadcasters:

Federation (or) Confederation	Competition	Period	Television Rights		Streaming Rights	
Federation (or) Confederation	Competition	Period	Conglomerate	Network	Conglomerate	Platform
Rugby India	Rugby Premier League	2025	JioStar	Star Sports	JioStar	JioHotstar

=== International competitions ===
List of current broadcasters:

Federation (or) Confederation	Competition	Period	Television Rights		Streaming Rights	
Federation (or) Confederation	Competition	Period	Conglomerate	Network	Conglomerate	Platform
World Rugby	Rugby World Cup	2023	Culver Max Entertainment	Sony Sports Network	Dream Sports	FanCode
World Rugby	Women's Rugby World Cup	2025				
Asia Rugby	Asia Rugby Championship	2025				
Asia Rugby	Asia Rugby Women's Championship	2025				

== Squash ==
=== International competitions ===
List of current broadcasters:

Federation (or) Confederation	Competition	Period	Television Rights		Streaming Rights	
Federation (or) Confederation	Competition	Period	Conglomerate	Network	Conglomerate	Platform
Professional Squash Association	World Squash Championships	2025	None		Professional Squash Association	Squash TV
Professional Squash Association	PSA Squash Tour Finals	2025	JioStar	Star Sports	JioStar	JioHotstar

== Table Tennis ==
=== Domestic competitions ===
List of current broadcasters:

Federation (or) Confederation	Competition	Period	Television Rights		Streaming Rights	
Federation (or) Confederation	Competition	Period	Conglomerate	Network	Conglomerate	Platform
Table Tennis Federation of India	Ultimate Table Tennis	2024	JioStar	Star Sports	JioStar	JioHotstar

=== International competitions ===
List of current broadcasters:

Federation (or) Confederation	Competition	Period	Television Rights		Streaming Rights	
Federation (or) Confederation	Competition	Period	Conglomerate	Network	Conglomerate	Platform
International Table Tennis Federation	World Table Tennis Championships	2023	WBD India	Eurosport India	WBD India	Discovery+
International Table Tennis Federation	World Team Table Tennis Championships	2024	None		International Table Tennis Federation	World Table Tennis
Asian Table Tennis Union	Asian Table Tennis Championships	2024	None		Asian Table Tennis Union	ATTU

== Tennis ==
=== Domestic competitions ===
List of current broadcasters:

Competition	Period	Television Rights		Streaming Rights	
Competition	Period	Conglomerate	Network	Conglomerate	Platform
Tennis Premier League	2025	Culver Max Entertainment	Sony Sports Network	JioStar	JioHotstar

=== International competitions ===
List of current broadcasters:

Competition	Period	Television Rights		Streaming Rights	
Competition	Period	Conglomerate	Channel(s)	Conglomerate	Platform
Grand Slam Tournaments
Wimbledon	2026	JioStar	Star Sports	JioStar	JioHotstar
Australian Open	2025	Culver Max Entertainment	Sony Sports Network	Culver Max Entertainment	Sony LIV
French Open	2025	Culver Max Entertainment	Sony Sports Network	Culver Max Entertainment	Sony LIV
US Open	2025-2030	JioStar	Star Sports	JioStar	JioHotstar
ATP Tour
ATP Finals	2026-28			Dream Sports	FanCode
ATP Tour Masters 1000	2026-28			Dream Sports	FanCode
ATP Tour 500	2026-28			Dream Sports	FanCode
ATP Tour 250	2026-28			Dream Sports	FanCode
WTA Tour
WTA Finals	2025	Tennis Channel			
WTA 1000 tournaments	2025	Tennis Channel			
WTA 500 tournaments	2025	Tennis Channel			
WTA 250 tournaments	2025	Tennis Channel			
ITF Team Events
Davis Cup	2023-24	Culver Max Entertainment	Sony Sports Network	Culver Max Entertainment	Sony LIV
Billie Jean King Cup		None			
Miscellaneous events
Laver Cup	2023	Culver Max Entertainment	Sony Sports Network	Culver Max Entertainment	Sony LIV
World Tennis League	2025	Culver Max Entertainment	Sony Sports Network	Dream Sports	FanCode

== Volleyball ==
=== Domestic competitions ===
==== Domestic franchise volleyball ====
List of current broadcasters:

Competition	Period	Television Rights		Streaming Rights	
Competition	Period	Conglomerate	Channel(s)	Conglomerate	Platform
Prime Volleyball League	2025	Culver Max Entertainment	Sony Sports Network	PVL	Prime Volleyball League

==== Domestic State franchise volleyball ====
List of current broadcasters:

State	Competition	Period	Television Rights		Streaming Rights	
State	Competition	Period	Conglomerate	Network	Conglomerate	Platform
Uttar Pradesh	Uttar Pradesh Pro Volleyball League	2025	Doordarshan	DD Sports	Doordarshan	Waves

=== International competitions ===
List of current broadcasters: List of current broadcasters:

Federation (or) Confederation	Competition	Period	Television Rights		Streaming Rights	
Federation (or) Confederation	Competition	Period	Conglomerate	Channel(s)	Conglomerate	Platform
Asian Volleyball Confederation	Asian Men's Volleyball Championship	2023	None		Asian Volleyball Confederation	Asian Volleyball Confederation
Asian Volleyball Confederation	Asian Women's Volleyball Championship	2023	None		Asian Volleyball Confederation	Asian Volleyball Confederation

== Wrestling ==
=== Amateur Wrestling ===
==== Domestic competitions ====
List of current broadcasters:

Competition	Period	Television Rights		Streaming Rights	
Competition	Period	Conglomerate	Network	Conglomerate	Platform
Pro Wrestling League	2026	Culver Max Entertainment	Sony Sports Network	Culver Max Entertainment	SonyLIV

=== Professional Wrestling ===
==== Domestic competitions ====
List of current broadcasters:

Competition	Period	Television Rights		Streaming Rights	
Competition	Period	Conglomerate	Network	Conglomerate	Platform
Global League Wrestling	2025	Doordarshan	DD Sports	Prasar Bharati	Waves

==== International competitions ====
List of current broadcasters:

Competition		Period	Television Rights		Streaming Rights	
Competition		Period	Conglomerate	Network	Conglomerate	Platform
WWE	Raw, Smackdown, NXT and Premium Live Events	2025-35	None		Netflix, Inc.	Netflix
WWE	Evolve and SNME	2025-35	Sony Pictures Networks	Sony Sports Network	Sony Pictures Networks	SonyLIV
All Elite Wrestling		2021	WBD India	Eurosport India	WBD India	Discovery+
Total Nonstop Action Wrestling		2024-2029	WBD India	Eurosport India	None	

== See also ==
- List of sports television broadcast contracts
- Sports broadcasters in India
