= List of 2026 Winter Olympics broadcasters =

The 2026 Winter Olympics in Milan and Cortina d'Ampezzo has been televised by a number of broadcasters throughout the world. As with previous years, Olympic Broadcasting Services produced the world feed provided to local broadcasters for use in their coverage.

== Broadcasters ==
In Italy, domestic pay-TV rights are owned by Warner Bros. Discovery, with free-to-air coverage and digital rights owned by RAI under a sub-license agreement with the European Broadcasting Union. On 16 January 2023, the IOC announced that it had renewed its European broadcast rights agreement with Warner Bros. Discovery Sports to last from 2026 through to 2032. The contract covers pay television and streaming rights to the Summer, Winter, and Youth Olympics on Eurosport and Discovery+ in 49 European territories. Unlike the previous contract where corporate precursor Discovery, Inc. was responsible for sub-licensing them to broadcasters in each country, free-to-air rights packages were concurrently awarded to the EBU and its members to cover at least 100 hours of each Winter Olympics. EBU member RAI then signed a sub-licensing deal for Italian free-to-air TV and digital rights.

In the United States, long-time rightsholder NBCUniversal spun off most of its cable networks into the separate company Versant in January 2026. Rights to carry NBC-produced coverage of the Games were sublicensed to Versant, allowing channels such as USA Network and CNBC to continue their tenure as cable rightsholders of the Olympics.

Territory	Rights holder	Ref
Afghanistan	ATN	
Albania	RTSH	
Andorra	RTVA	
Armenia	AMPTV	
Australia	Nine	
Austria	ORF	
Azerbaijan	İTV	
Belgium	RTBF, VRT	
Bosnia and Herzegovina	BHRT	
Brazil	Grupo Globo and CazéTV	
Brunei	RTB, Age of Sports	
Bulgaria	BNT	
Canada	CBC/Radio-Canada, TSN, RDS, Sportsnet	
Caribbean	Rush Sports	
Central Asia	Infront Sports & Media	
Chile	Chilevisión (Only Delayed Content and Live Ceremonies)	
China (Note: Mainland China only)	CMG and Migu	
Croatia	HRT	
Cyprus	CyBC	
Czech Republic	ČT	
Denmark	DR, TV 2	
East Timor	Age of Sports	
Estonia	ERR	
Europe (Note: Except Belarus and Russia)	EBU, Warner Bros. Discovery	
Finland	YLE	
France	France Télévisions	
Georgia	GPB	
Germany	ARD, ZDF	
Greece	ERT	
Hong Kong	Age of Sports (replay only), no live broadcast	
Hungary	MTVA	
Iceland	RÚV	
India	JioHotstar	
Indonesia	TVRI, Age of Sports	
Ireland	RTÉ	
Israel	Sports Channel	
Italy	RAI	
Japan	Japan Consortium	
Kazakhstan	RTRK, Khabar	
Kosovo	RTK	
Kyrgyzstan	KTRK	
Laos	Age of Sports	
Latin America (Note: Except Brazil and Cuba)	Claro Sports	
Latvia	LTV	
Liechtenstein	SRG SSR	
Lithuania	LRT	
Macau	CMG and TDM	
Malaysia	RTM, Age of Sports	
Malta	PBS	
Mexico	TelevisaUnivision	
Middle East and North Africa	beIN Sports	
Moldova	TRM	
Mongolia	NTV, MNB, TenGer TV, Suld TV, C1, Edu TV	
Montenegro	RTCG	
Myanmar	M Sport/BebeeTV	
Netherlands	NOS	
New Zealand	Sky	
North Korea	KCTV	
North Macedonia	MRT	
Norway	NRK, VG+ Sport (Note: Ice hockey only)	
Paraguay	ABC TV	
Philippines	Cignal, Age of Sports	
Poland	TVP	
Portugal	RTP	
Romania	TVR	
Russia	Okko	
San Marino	RAI	
Serbia	RTS	
Singapore	Mediacorp, Age of Sports	
Slovakia	STVR	
Slovenia	RTV SLO	
Southeast Asia	Infront Sports & Media	
South Korea	JTBC, NAVER	
Spain	RTVE	
Sub-Saharan Africa	StarTimes	
Sweden	SVT and TV4	
Switzerland	SRG SSR	
Taiwan	ELTA, TTV (Note: Terrestrial broadcast only)	
Tajikistan	Varzish TV	
Thailand	TrueVisions	
Turkey	TRT	
Turkmenistan	Age of Sports	
Ukraine	Suspilne	
United Kingdom	BBC, TNT Sports (Discovery)	
United States	NBCUniversal, Versant	
Uzbekistan	Sport TV, Age of Sports	
Vietnam	VTVcab, VTV	
