= Dahlia TV =

Italian pay-per-view television network

- Country: Italy

Ownership
- Owner: Dahlia TV S.r.l.

History
- Launched: 7 March 2009
- Closed: 25 February 2011
- Former names: La7 Cartapiù

Links
- Website: www.dahliatv.it

Dahlia TV was an Italian pay-per-view television network available on digital terrestrial television, offering 12 widescreen channels. Telecom Italia Media owns a 9% stake in the company.

== Programming ==
=== Dahlia Calcio ===
Dahlia Calcio had five channels, and was a competitor of Premium Calcio, broadcasting some matches of Serie A. Dahlia TV also holds the rights to broadcast some matches of Serie B, exclusive to digital terrestrial television.

=== Dahlia Sport ===
Dahlia Sport had two channels and offered a range of sports programming, in particular soccer, football, beach volleyball, poker, boxing, rugby, auto and motorcycle racing, tennis and sailing. Programming includes events from Coupe de la Ligue, Swatch FIVB World Tour, NASCAR, Superbike World Championship, National Football League, Volvo Ocean Race, America's Cup, World Grand Prix Darts, Pro14 and additional programming from MUTV, Chelsea TV and Barça TV.

=== Dahlia Xtreme ===
Dahlia Xtreme broadcasts extreme sports-related programming, in particular wrestling, kickboxing, mixed martial arts, parkour, paintball, slamball, free climbing and rodeo. Programming includes WWE SmackDown, WWE Raw, Nu-Wrestling Evolution, World Extreme Cagefighting, Red Bull X-Fighters, Hulk Hogan's Celebrity Championship Wrestling, F1 Powerboat World Championship, Speedway Grand Prix, Formula D.

=== Dahlia Explorer ===
Dahlia Explorer was a television channel devoted to nature, crime & investigation, science and lifestyle programming. Programming include Planet Earth, Planet Earth: The Future, The Hairy Bikers and other programs from BBC and truTV.

=== Dahlia Eros ===
Dahlia Eros, with Dahlia Adult, offered a range of adult-themed programming, broadcasting softcore and hardcore movies, including also hentai. These channels were featured a parental control to limit the access of underage people.
