= List of US Open (tennis) broadcasters =

ESPN took full control of televising the event in 2015. When taking over, ESPN ended 47 years of coverage produced and aired by CBS. ESPN uses ESPN, ESPN2, and ABC for broadcasts, while putting outer court coverage on ESPN+.

== 2020s ==
=== Notes ===
- In 2024, ESPN inked a new 12-year deal to continue coverage of the tournament that would retain ESPN as the broadcaster through 2037. As part of the agreement, ESPN will debut whip-round coverage the first week of the tournament on ESPN+. Fan Week coverage would expand and be broadcast on ESPN2. The first and middle Sundays of the tournament will air on ABC. ESPN also obtained limited sublicense rights.

== 2010s ==
=== Notes ===
- On May 17, 2013, ESPN signed a contract (an 11-year deal at $770 million; about $250 million more than CBS was willing to pay) with the United States Tennis Association that would give it the rights to broadcast the U.S. Open starting in 2015, ending CBS's role in covering the tournament after 47 years. At the end of their 2014 coverage, CBS for their closing credits montage, highlighting the greatest moments during their 47-year run with the US Open, used Alicia Keys's "Empire State of Mind (Part II) Broken Down".
- In August 2012, CBS Sports Network began to offer additional coverage of the US Open, including replays of classic matches, coverage of qualifying matches, a pre-match show, and coverage of third- and fourth-round matches not shown by CBS.
- For several years, due to the overlapping scheduling of the U.S. Open and the Jerry Lewis MDA Labor Day Telethon on Labor Day weekend, many CBS affiliates had to provide alternate scheduling to accommodate one of the events. This issue was resolved in 2011, when all CBS affiliates that had aired the MDA Telethon became able to air the U.S. Open on Labor Day, as the Muscular Dystrophy Association had decided to reduce the telethon (renamed that year as the MDA Show of Strength) from a 21½-hour broadcast (lasting from the Sunday night before the holiday to the late-afternoon of Labor Day itself) to a six-hour prime time broadcast (airing only on the night before the holiday). Some CBS stations arranged for co-owned/managed independent stations and affiliates of smaller networks (such as UPN/MyNetworkTV affiliate WHTV in Lansing, Michigan in lieu of WLNS-TV; Fox affiliate KASA-TV in Albuquerque, New Mexico in lieu of KRQE; and MyNetworkTV affiliate WNEM-DT2 in Flint, Michigan in lieu of its parent station's main channel) to carry the network's coverage of the U.S. Open on Labor Day in order to air the telethon. In other cases, the alternate U.S. Open broadcaster in a given market was unrelated to the local CBS station. In Albany, New York, WB affiliate WEWB-TV (now CW affiliate WCWN, then owned by Tribune Broadcasting) took on the responsibility of airing network coverage of the U.S. Open (as well as other local and network programming) in lieu of Schenectady-based WRGB (then owned by Freedom Communications; WCWN and WRGB are now jointly owned by the Sinclair Broadcast Group) through 2004. Time Warner Cable's Capital District system (which carried it on channel 3) took over the local rights to the tournament in 2005, due to a crop of syndicated program premieres on Labor Day that prevented WCWN from airing the tournament.
- In 2010, CBS broadcast the U.S. Open in 3D on DirecTV N3D.
  - In 2010, CBS forced the United States Tennis Association to move the final to Monday out of fear that a relatively short Sunday rain delay was going to knock the Sunday men's final into its prime time lineup (in particular, 60 Minutes). Ironically, the rain by early evening had let up and thus, tennis could have been played. While CBS did get its men's final at 4 p.m. as initially scheduled, another rain delay came about at a little after 6 p.m. By that point however, CBS abandoned its tennis coverage in favor of the CBS Evening News. In the meantime, CBS announced that they wouldn't finish broadcasting the match once the delay had ended. Therefore, viewers had to scramble to ESPN2 to watch the conclusion of that particular Novak Djokovic-Rafael Nadal final. And since ESPN2 themselves eventually had to redirect to the second half of its Monday Night Football doubleheader, it awkwardly had to cut off from Nadal's post-match ceremony.

== 2000s ==
Year	Network	Play-by-play	Color commentators	Sideline reporters
2008	CBS; USA; DirecTV	Dick Enberg, Bill Macatee and Ian Eagle; Ted Robinson and Bill Macatee; Barry Mackay and Jack Edwards	John McEnroe, Mary Carillo and Patrick McEnroe; John McEnroe, Jim Courier and Tracy Austin; Jeff Tarango, Chanda Rubin and Mark Woodforde	Mary Joe Fernandez; Michael Barkann
2007	CBS	Dick Enberg, Bill Macatee and Ian Eagle	John McEnroe, Mary Carillo and Patrick McEnroe	Mary Joe Fernandez
2006	CBS	Dick Enberg, Ian Eagle and Bill Macatee	John McEnroe, Mary Carillo, Pam Shriver and Patrick McEnroe	Mary Joe Fernandez and Tracy Wolfson
2005	CBS	Dick Enberg	John McEnroe and Mary Carillo	
2004	CBS	Dick Enberg	John McEnroe and Mary Carillo	

=== Notes ===
- Occasionally, The Late Late Show was split into 15- and 45-minute segments in order to allow CBS to air a daily late-night highlight show for the US Open tennis tournament (as well as the Masters and other PGA Tour events whose broadcast rights are held by CBS). The tournament highlights were broadcast in-between the monologue and the guest segments. However, in mid-2007, the highlights show began airing first, with the full hour of The Late Late Show airing on a delay.
- Universal HD provided the high definition simulcast of USA Network's coverage of the US Open tennis tournament in 2006 and 2007.
- CBS was the first network to use the MacCam (a system of slow-motion cameras developed by FastCAM Replay LLC and DEL Imaging Systems LLC used during tennis matches to replay close or controversial line calls) widely, as John McEnroe was one of their tennis analysts. The MacCam was first used at the 2004 US Open to demonstrate several poor calls by chair umpires. In Serena Williams' controversial quarterfinal loss to Jennifer Capriati, several poor calls were contested by Williams. Television replays demonstrated that there were actually several crucial calls that were obviously erroneous.
- On September 14, 2009, Juan Martín del Potro upset Roger Federer to win the Men's U.S. Open Championship. Dick Enberg hosted the post-match ceremony during which a victorious Del Potro requested to address his fans in Spanish. Enberg declined the request saying that he was running out of time, but went on to list the corporate-sponsored prizes that Del Potro won. A couple of minutes later, Del Potro made the same request again and only then Enberg relented saying "Very quickly, in Spanish, he wants to say hello to his friends here and in Argentina". An emotional Del Potro finally spoke a few sentences in Spanish to a cheering crowd. Many viewers expressed disappointment with Enberg and CBS over the interview. A CBS executive later defended Enberg, noting that the contract with the United States Tennis Association required that certain sponsors receive time during the ceremony.
- Dick Enberg took over the lead role at the US Open for CBS beginning in 2000. Prior to that he worked the French Open and Wimbledon for NBC for many years.
- All the courts used by the U.S. Open are lighted, meaning that television coverage of the tournament can extend into prime time to attract higher ratings. This has recently been used to the advantage of the USA Network cable channel and especially for CBS, which used its influence to move the women's singles final to Saturday night to draw higher viewership.

== 1990s ==
Year	Network	Play-by-play	Color commentators	Sideline reporters
1999	CBS	Bill Macatee	John McEnroe and Mary Carillo	
1995	CBS	Tim Ryan	John McEnroe and Mary Carillo	Andrea Joyce
1994	CBS	Tim Ryan	Tony Trabert and Mary Carillo	
1991	CBS	Pat Summerall	Tony Trabert, Virginia Wade and Mary Carillo	Andrea Joyce
1990	CBS; USA	Pat Summerall, Tim Ryan and Jim Nantz; Bill Macatee, Bruce Beck and Ted Robinson	Tony Trabert and Mary Carillo; Billie Jean King, Vitas Gerulaitis	Lesley Visser and John Dockery; Diana Nyad, Barry MacKay

=== Notes ===
- John McEnroe had been the lead analyst on all men's finals on both NBC and CBS since 1995.
  - For 1995, the pre-match opening on CBS was hosted by Pat O'Brien, while in-match 'sideline' reports were provided by Andrea Joyce.

== 1980s ==
Year	Network	Play-by-play	Color commentators
1988	CBS	Pat Summerall	Tony Trabert and Mary Carillo
1986	CBS; USA	Pat Summerall and Tim Ryan; Tim Ryan and Barry MacKay	Tony Trabert, John Newcombe and Mary Carillo; Mary Carillo
1985	CBS	Pat Summerall	Tony Trabert and John Newcombe
1984	CBS	Pat Summerall	Tony Trabert and John Newcombe
1981	CBS	Pat Summerall	Tony Trabert and John Newcombe
1980	CBS	Pat Summerall	Tony Trabert and John Newcombe

=== Notes ===
- In 1982, CBS debuted "Super Saturday". The Men's Semifinals sandwiched the Women's Final, with the first semifinal match starting at 11:00 a.m. Eastern Time.
- The USA Network was the longtime cable home of the US Open beginning in 1984, which moved to ESPN2 and the Tennis Channel as of 2009.
- On September 11, 1987, Dan Rather walked off the set in anger just before a remote broadcast of the CBS Evening News when it appeared that CBS's coverage of a U.S. Open semifinal match between Steffi Graf and Lori McNeil was going to run into time allotted for the network news program. Rather was in Miami covering the visit to the city by Pope John Paul II, who began a rare U.S. tour. The tennis match ended at 6:32 p.m. Eastern Time, however Rather was nowhere to be found. Over 100 affiliates broadcast the six minutes of dead air that followed before he returned to the broadcast position. Rather later suggested that he intended to force the sports division to fill up the entire half-hour so that he would not have to truncate the elaborately planned coverage of the papal visit. The next day, Rather, anchoring from New Orleans, apologized for leaving the anchor desk.

== 1970s ==
Year	Network	Play-by-play	Color commentators
1978	CBS	Pat Summerall	Tony Trabert and John Newcombe
1977	CBS	Pat Summerall	Tony Trabert
1976	CBS	Pat Summerall	Tony Trabert, Arthur Ashe and Julie Anthony
1975	CBS	Jack Whitaker and Pat Summerall	Tony Trabert
1974	CBS	Pat Summerall	Tony Trabert
1973	CBS	Pat Summerall	Jack Kramer, Tony Trabert, and Julie Heldman
1972	CBS	Bud Collins	Jack Kramer
1971	CBS	Bud Collins	Jack Kramer and Ann Jones
1970	CBS	Bud Collins	Jack Kramer

== 1960s ==
Year	Network	Play-by-play	Color commentators
1969	CBS	Bud Collins	Jack Kramer
1968	CBS	Bud Collins	Jack Kramer
1967	ABC	Jim McKay	Jack Kramer
1966	ABC	Jim McKay	Jack Kramer
1965	ABC	Jim McKay	Jack Kramer
1964	NBC	Bud Collins	Vic Seixas
1963	Syndication	Jim Leaming	Bob Kelleher
1962	NBC	Jim Leaming	Jack Kramer
1961	NBC	Bill Stern	Bill Talbert
1960	NBC	Bill Stern	Don Budge

=== Notes ===
- CBS Sports first broadcast the US Open Tennis Championships in 1968. Bud Collins called the action alongside Jack Kramer.

== 1950s ==
Year	Network	Play-by-play	Color commentators
1959	NBC	Bud Palmer	Bill Talbert and Don Budge
1958	NBC	Bud Palmer	Don Budge and Jack Kramer
1956	NBC	Bud Palmer	Jack Kramer and Lindsey Nelson
1955	NBC	Bud Palmer	Jack Kramer
1954	NBC	Bud Palmer	Jack Kramer
1953	NBC	Bud Palmer	Don Budge
1952	NBC	Unknown	

=== Notes ===
- NBC broadcast the US Nationals as early as 1952 up until 1964. Bud Palmer, Jack Kramer, Lindsey Nelson, Don Budge, Bill Stern and Bill Talbert were among the commentators during this period.

== Other regions ==
- Continental Europe – Eurosport
- Latin America & Caribbean – ESPN International
- Middle East & North Africa – beIN Sports
- Southern Africa – SuperSport
- Indian subcontinent – Star Sports Select
- Southeast Asia – SPOTV
- Oceania – ESPN International

Exceptions

- UK and Ireland – Sky Sports
- Australia – Nine Network and Stan Sport
- Canada – TSN and RDS
- China – CCTV and iQIYI
- Japan – Wowow
- Pakistan – PTV Sports
- South Korea – JTBC

== See also ==
- Tennis on television
- Tennis_on_CBS#Commentators
- Tennis_on_ESPN#Announcers
- Tennis_on_NBC#Commentators
- Tennis_on_USA#Commentators
