= CazéTV =

Brazilian sports channel

- Logo

YouTube information
- Channel: @CazeTV
- Years active: 2022–present
- Genre: Sports
- Subscribers: 41,3 million
- Views: 12,5 billion
- Last updated: July 19, 2026

CazéTV (Brazilian Portuguese pronunciation: [kaˈzɛ teˈve]) is a Brazilian multi-platform sports and entertainment channel, which broadcasts on YouTube, Amazon Prime Video, Disney+, Samsung TV Plus, and Mercado Play (the last three as linear channels), specializing in sports events. Created in November 2022 by streamer Casimiro Miguel in association with LiveMode, a sports marketing company based in Rio de Janeiro that retains majority ownership, the channel's initial objective was to broadcast matches of the 2022 FIFA World Cup.

After the success of its first broadcasts, CazéTV bought new broadcasting rights, including the 2023 FIFA Women's World Cup, 2023 Pan American Games, 2024 Olympic Games, 2025 FIFA Club World Cup, Campeonato Brasileiro Série A, 2026 FIFA World Cup, among other events.

On January 17, 2024, it became the largest sports channel on YouTube in Brazil.

On 17 November 2025, LiveMode acquired 100% of CazéTV’s shares; previously it had held a 51% stake, while CMiguel Produções, led by streamer Casimiro Miguel, owned 49%. The company, founded by Edgar Diniz and Sérgio Lopes, former creators of Esporte Interativo, thereby consolidated full control of the channel.

In May 2026, Cristiano Ronaldo became a shareholder in LiveModeTV.

== History ==
=== Background ===
In December 2020, LiveMode brokered the broadcast of a match between Vasco da Gama and Athletico Paranaense from the 2020 Campeonato Brasileiro on Casimiro Miguel's Twitch channel, through paid access. In January 2021, still for the 2020 season, the streamer also broadcast Athletico's matches against Flamengo and Internacional.

The partnership continued in the 2021 Campeonato Brasileiro, with Casimiro Miguel's Twitch channel broadcasting Athletico's home matches against Internacional and Red Bull Bragantino.

In January 2022, Casimiro Miguel announced the regular broadcasting of sports events on his Twitch channel. Soon after, a partnership was formed to broadcast matches of the 2022 Campeonato Carioca. In April 18 home matches of Athletico Paranaense in the 2022 Campeonato Brasileiro were broadcast via paid access. On 9 November 2022, streamer Casimiro Miguel announced the creation of CazéTV, a YouTube channel dedicated to broadcasting sporting events, in partnership with LiveMode. On 20 November 2022, CazéTV made its World Cup debut with the broadcast of Qatar vs Ecuador. On 24 November 2022, it broadcast Brazil's match against Serbia in the opening round of Group G, which reached 3.5 million concurrent viewers on YouTube.

On 13 July 2026, CazéTV entered the group of the ten largest Brazilian YouTube channels by number of subscribers, according to Social Blade, reaching around 40 million subscribers and surpassing the children’s channel Galinha Pintadinha.

=== 2022 FIFA World Cup ===
In November 2022, LiveMode coordinated with FIFA to allow matches of the 2022 FIFA World Cup to be streamed by Casimiro. Shortly after, the creation of a new YouTube channel, CazéTV, was announced in order to broadcast 22 matches. During the tournament, Casimiro also simulcasted on his Twitch channel.

The opening match between Qatar and Ecuador reached approximately 1 million simultaneous viewers. Brazil's opening game against Serbia in the group stage reached 3.5 million, while the Round of 16 match against South Korea reached 5.3 million. Brazil's final match in the tournament peaked at 6.9 million simultaneous viewers.

=== 2023 Campeonato Carioca and FIFA Club World Cup ===
In January 2023, the channel bought the rights to broadcast home matches of Botafogo and Vasco da Gama in the 2023 Campeonato Carioca. Additionally, CazéTV bought the digital rights to seven matches of the 2022 FIFA Club World Cup. It also broadcast Vasco's matches in the 2023 Florida Tour.

On February 7, the channel renewed its deal to broadcast Athletico Paranaense's home matches in the 2023 Campeonato Brasileiro. Unlike other tournaments, these matches were exclusively available to YouTube channel members.

=== Partnership with the Brazilian Olympic Committee ===
On February 11, CazéTV signed an agreement with the Brazilian Olympic Committee to produce content for Time Brasil during the 2023 Pan American Games and the 2024 Olympic Games. On May 24, it was officially announced that the channel would provide full coverage of the Pan American Games.

=== 2023 FIFA Women's World Cup ===
After the success of the men's tournament in Qatar, it was announced on March 21, during a promotional event with Google, that CazéTV would also broadcast the 2023 FIFA Women's World Cup. It was the first women's football tournament aired by the channel.

=== 2024 Summer Olympic Games ===
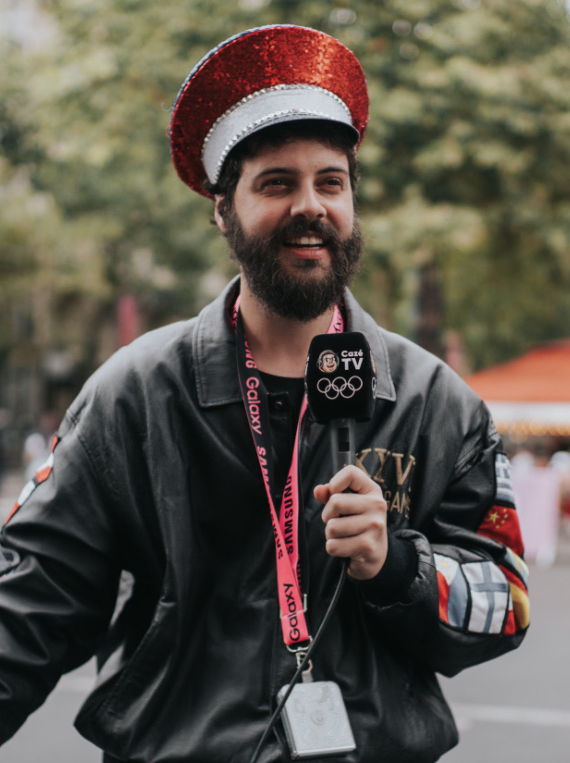
Diogo Defante, 2024 Summer Olympics

During its coverage of the 2023 Pan American Games, on November 2, CazéTV announced it would broadcast the 2024 Summer Olympic Games, committing to over 500 hours of live coverage.

CazéTV reached 42 million total viewers throughout the tournament and set a record for the largest live audience in Olympic sports history on the internet, with 4 million simultaneous viewers during the artistic gymnastics team finals, where Brazil won a bronze medal.

=== UEFA Europa League and UEFA Conference League ===
On July 1, 2024, it was officially announced that CazéTV would broadcast the UEFA Europa League and UEFA Conference League for three seasons, starting from 2024 to 2025.

=== Campeonato Brasileiro (2023–present) ===
In 2023, the channel began broadcasting Athletico Paranaense's home matches, exclusively for YouTube channel members. The partnership was extended into 2024. That same year, it was announced that from 2025 to 2027, one match per round would be broadcast openly on YouTube, in partnership with Liga Forte União.

=== CONMEBOL Tournaments ===
On February 19, 2025, CazéTV was announced as the new official producer of highlights and clips for CONMEBOL Libertadores, CONMEBOL Sudamericana, and CONMEBOL Recopa until 2026, replacing OneFootball in this role.

=== FIFA Club World Cup ===
On March 17, 2025, the broadcast of the FIFA Club World Cup was announced. Initially, the agreement included the airing of thirty-nine matches. However, in May, the deal was expanded to encompass all matches of the tournament. The broadcast of the match between Flamengo and Bayern Munich reached a peak of 5.6 million connected devices on YouTube.

=== 2026 FIFA World Cup ===
In April 2024, FIFA reached an agreement with LiveMode to sell the broadcast rights for the 2026 World Cup in Brazil. On July 13, 2025, CazéTV announced an agreement with FIFA and will broadcast the 2026 World Cup, showing all 104 matches.

On August 14, 2025, CazéTV announced that it is exploring the possibility of expanding its availability to broadcast television, inspired by the launch of Xsports. However, the company did not disclose a specific timeline for this expansion.

On June 11, 2026, LiveMode, the company that owns CazéTV, launched the LiveModeTV channel in Portugal. Its first broadcast was the match between Mexico and South Africa, part of the 2026 FIFA World Cup. On the same day, during halftime of that match, CazéTV announced a sublicensing agreement with ESPN to broadcast the Premier League starting from the 2026–27 season. Under the deal, the channel will air one English league match per round for free on its YouTube channel.

=== UEFA Euro 2028 ===
On July 4, 2026, CazéTV announced the acquisition of exclusive broadcasting rights for Brazil for all 51 matches of UEFA Euro 2028.
