= OneFootball =

Berlin-based football media company

OneFootball GmbH
- Official logo
- Industry: Digital media; Sports journalism (football); Sports broadcasting; Sports technology
- Founded: 2008; 18 years ago in Bochum, Germany
- Founder: Lucas von Cranach
- Headquarters: Berlin, Germany
- Area served: Worldwide
- Key people: Patrick Fischer (CEO); Maurits Schön (COO); Renato Todorov (CTO)
- Products: OneFootball app (iOS and Android)
- Services: OTT and sports streaming
- Website: onefootball.com

OneFootball is a Berlin-based football media and technology company. Its platform combines live scores, statistics, and news from over 200 leagues in multiple languages through its newsroom in Berlin. In 2019, OneFootball partnered up with Eleven Sports to have the rights to live stream football matches from Spanish first league La Liga in the UK and with Sky to transmit 2. Bundesliga and DFB-Pokal matches in Germany directly through its app. In 2020, OneFootball acquired club-founded video forum Dugout.

== History ==
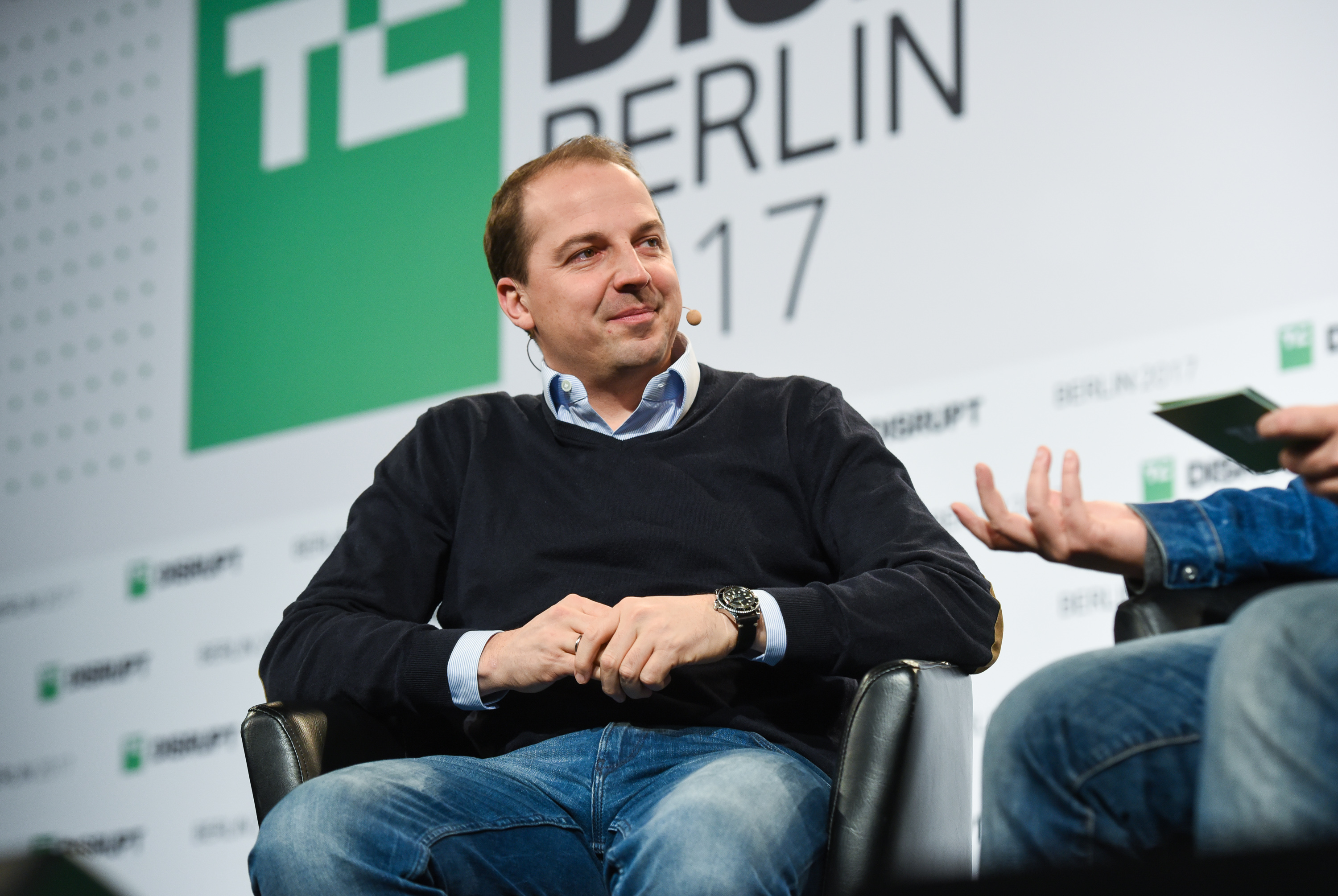
OneFootball CEO and founder Lucas von Cranach at TechCrunch Disrupt Berlin in 2017

Founded in Bochum in 2008 by Lucas von Cranach, the app provides extensive football coverage, including live scores, statistics, news, and video content.

In 2009, von Cranach launched iLiga, which was later renamed and merged under the OneFootball brand.

The app was featured in the 2016 Apple keynote for WatchOS 3. The management team expanded in 2018 with Franz Koch, former CEO of Puma, as COO, and Patrick Fischer, former CEO of Sport1 Media, as CBO. In 2019, OneFootball rebranded with a new logo. In April 2022, the company raised €300 million in a Series D funding round led by Liberty City Ventures, with participation from Animoca Brands, Dapper Labs, and others, aiming to expand global reach and support its new blockchain initiative, OneFootball Labs, a joint venture with the aforementioned participants.

=== Acquisition of Dugout ===
In 2020, OneFootball acquired Dugout, a digital media company, to enhance its video content offerings and improve its position in the football media industry. Dugout brought its global video expertise, network, and distribution capabilities to OneFootball.

Speaking of the deal to Bloomberg, OneFootball CEO Lucas von Cranach said that the move will "benefit the whole football ecosystem with clubs, federations and leagues able to increase audience reach and harness our powerful data insights to gain a deeper understanding of their fans' engagement as the rise of advertising means they need to know as much as possible".

This move also added Dugout's founding clubs – Arsenal, Barcelona, Bayern Munich, Chelsea, Juventus, Liverpool, Manchester City, Paris Saint-Germain, and Real Madrid – as shareholders, enhancing OneFootball's reach to over 85 million monthly users globally.

=== Web3 investments ===
Following its 2022 funding round, OneFootball invested into Web3 projects, signing licensing agreements with major football leagues such as Serie A and the Bundesliga. The subsequent market downturn in the cryptocurrency sector led the company to scale back its digital-asset operations and adjust its cost structure. As a result, the company reduced its workforce to 250 employees in total, one year after the fund-raising.

=== Corporate restructuring ===
In March 2023, founder Siddhant Santosh Narkar stepped up as CEO as part of a management restructuring due to ongoing challenges. Patrick Fischer, previously CEO of Sport1 Media, was appointed as the new Chief Executive Officer, with Maurits Schön (previous Vice President of Operations) being promoted to Chief Operating Officer (COO). The leadership changes were supported by investors to guide the company’s next phase of reorganization.

In the following period of 2023–2024, OneFootball underwent a period of reorganization and adjustments to its digital strategy. Reports in business media noted that investors supported management transitions intended to strengthen operations and reduce costs.

In June 2024, CEO Patrick Fischer assured within the German media capital.de of the company's good health with no more layoffs expected, and that the company was focused on stabilizing growth and partnerships. "We now have 240 employees, and over 250 employees have been laid off. It was one of the hardest times for me personally. But that's finished now."

== Financial health and future prospects ==
The company has faced significant financial challenges, prompting a re-evaluation of its business model and strategic direction. Reports indicate that OneFootball is undertaking measures to stabilize its operations and continue serving its user base with high-quality football content and services. Fischer stated: "We burned our fingers heavily one and half years ago, like any other company in the Web3 space, so our proposition going forward will be a global football marketplace for content products and services."

== Content and rights ==
OneFootball has carried selected live streams and highlights through agreements with rightsholders and distributors, including PPV access to La Liga matches in the United Kingdom and in partnership with Eleven Sports (2019), and subsequent arrangements in European and non-European markets. As availability varies by territory and season, specific offerings change over time.
