= List of unusual dismissals in international cricket =

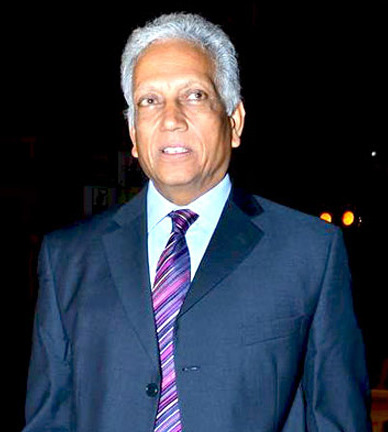
Mohinder Amarnath (pictured in 2012) is the only player to be dismissed for both handling the ball and obstructing the field in international cricket.

In cricket, a player is dismissed when they lose their wicket. At this point, the batsman must discontinue batting and leave the field permanently. A batsman can be dismissed in a number of ways, the most common being bowled, caught, leg before wicket (LBW), stumped, run out and hit wicket. Much rarer are hit the ball twice, obstructing the field, retired out and timed out. These are regarded by analysts as unusual ways of dismissals in cricket, where the bowler is denied any credit. (Note: A bowler gets credit for all usual dismissals except run out.) Handled the ball was a previously a separate method of dismissal, now incorporated into obstructing the field. As of October 2026, there have been 105 instances of players being dismissed unusually in international cricket: 11 in Test cricket, 12 in One Day Internationals (ODIs), 33 in Twenty20 Internationals (T20Is), 3 in Women's One Day International and 46 in Women's Twenty20 International.

== Test cricket ==
In Tests, England batsman Leonard Hutton was the first player to be dismissed for obstructing the field, while playing against South Africa in August 1951. Between January 1957 and March 2001, six different players were dismissed for handling the ball, the most common form of an unusual dismissal. Sri Lanka cricketers Marvan Atapattu and Mahela Jayawardene are the only Test players to be dismissed retired out, when playing against Bangladesh in 2001. Sri Lanka's captain, Sanath Jayasuriya, received strong criticism for the team's act.

Russell Endean, the South African wicketkeeper, was involved in both of the first two unusual dismissals. First came his involvement in Len Hutton's "obstructing the field" dismissal: Endean was prevented from attempting a catch, when Hutton used his bat to prevent the ball landing on his stumps after he had edged it up in the air. (The striker guarding his stumps is the only circumstance in which a ball can legally be hit twice: so Hutton came close to that form of dismissal too, if the umpire had ruled that the ball was not in fact headed towards the wicket.) Six years later, in similar circumstances after edging the ball up in the air and seeing it drop towards his stumps, Endean used his free hand instead of his bat to intercept the ball, and was given out handled the ball. The second "handled the ball" dismissal was more unfortunate: Andrew Hilditch, at the non-striker's end, picked up the stationary ball to hand it back to a fielder, the only instance of a non-striker suffering this dismissal. All subsequent instances of "handled the ball" have been more similar to Endean's, with a batsman using his free hand to guard his stumps.

In December 2023, Mushfiqur Rahim became the first person in test cricket to be dismissed for obstructing the field since the rule for handling the ball was subsumed into this law in October 2017.

No.	Player	Dismissal	Runs	Team	Opposition	Venue	Match	Date	Result
1	Leonard Hutton	Obstructing the field	27	England	South Africa	The Oval, London, England	5th Test	16 August 1951	Won
2	Russell Endean	Handled the ball	3	South Africa	England	Newlands Cricket Ground, Cape Town, South Africa	2nd Test	1 January 1957	Lost
3	Andrew Hilditch	Handled the ball	29	Australia	Pakistan	W.A.C.A. Ground, Perth, Australia	2nd Test	24 March 1979	Won
4	Mohsin Khan	Handled the ball	58	Pakistan	Australia	National Stadium, Karachi, Pakistan	1st Test	22 September 1982	Won
5	Desmond Haynes	Handled the ball	55	West Indies	India	Wankhede Stadium, Mumbai, India	4th Test	24 November 1983	Drawn
6	Graham Gooch	Handled the ball	133	England	Australia	Old Trafford Cricket Ground, Manchester, England	1st Test	3 June 1993	Lost
7	Steve Waugh	Handled the ball	47	Australia	India	M. A. Chidambaram Stadium, Chennai, India	3rd Test	18 March 2001	Lost
8	Marvan Atapattu	Retired out	201	Sri Lanka	Bangladesh	Sinhalese Sports Club Ground, Colombo, Sri Lanka	2nd Test	6 September 2001	Won
9	Mahela Jayawardene	Retired out	150	Sri Lanka	Bangladesh	Sinhalese Sports Club Ground, Colombo, Sri Lanka	2nd Test	6 September 2001	Won
10	Michael Vaughan	Handled the ball	64	England	India	M. Chinnaswamy Stadium, Bangalore, India	3rd Test	19 December 2001	Drawn
11	Mushfiqur Rahim	Obstructing the field	35	Bangladesh	New Zealand	Shere Bangla National Stadium, Mirpur, Bangladesh	2nd Test	6 December 2023	Lost

== Men's One Day International cricket ==
In men's ODIs, eleven players have been dismissed on twelve occasions in an unusual manner. The first such occasion was when India's Mohinder Amarnath was given out for handling the ball, against Australia in February 1986. The following year, Pakistan cricketer Rameez Raja became the first player to be given out for obstructing the field in ODIs: with the match lost, but himself on a score of 98, he attempted two runs off the final ball and used his bat to deliberately block a run-out attempt when going for the second run that would have got him a century. In 1989, Amarnath was dismissed in a similar fashion, kicking the ball away to prevent a run-out attempt, while playing in a match against Sri Lanka, thus becoming the first player to be dismissed by two different unusual methods. Obstructing the field has been the most common method of unusual dismissal in men's ODIs, happening on eight of the twelve occasions.

Sri Lanka's Angelo Mathews became the first person to be dismissed Timed out in international cricket during a group stage match against Bangladesh in the 2023 Cricket World Cup.

No.	Player	Dismissal	Runs	Team	Opposition	Venue	Match	Date	Result
1	Mohinder Amarnath	Handled the ball	15	India	Australia	Melbourne Cricket Ground, Melbourne, Australia	2nd Final	9 February 1986	Lost
2	Rameez Raja	Obstructing the field	99	Pakistan	England	National Stadium, Karachi, Pakistan	2nd ODI	20 November 1987	Lost
3	Mohinder Amarnath	Obstructing the field	28	India	Sri Lanka	Gujarat Stadium, Ahmedabad, India	ODI	22 October 1989	Won
4	Daryll Cullinan	Handled the ball	46	South Africa	West Indies	Kingsmead Cricket Ground, Durban, South Africa	3rd ODI	27 January 1999	Won
5	Inzamam ul-Haq	Obstructing the field	16	Pakistan	India	Arbab Niaz Stadium, Peshawar, Pakistan	1st ODI	6 February 2006	Won
6	Mohammed Hafeez	Obstructing the field	0	Pakistan	South Africa	Kingsmead Cricket Ground, Durban, South Africa	4th ODI	21 March 2013	Won
7	Anwar Ali	Obstructing the field	0	Pakistan	South Africa	St George's Park, Port Elizabeth, South Africa	2nd ODI	27 November 2013	Won
8	Ben Stokes	Obstructing the field	10	England	Australia	Lord's, London, England	2nd ODI	5 September 2015	Lost
9	Chamu Chibhabha	Handled the ball	18	Zimbabwe	Afghanistan	Queens Sports Club, Bulawayo, Zimbabwe	3rd ODI	20 October 2015	Won
10	Xavier Marshall	Obstructing the field	34	United States	United Arab Emirates	Sharjah Cricket Stadium, Sharjah, UAE	ODI	8 December 2019	Won
11	Danushka Gunathilaka	Obstructing the field	55	Sri Lanka	West Indies	Sir Vivian Richards Stadium, Antigua, Antigua and Barbuda	1st ODI	10 March 2021	Lost
12	Angelo Mathews	Timed out	0	Sri Lanka	Bangladesh	Arun Jaitley Stadium, Delhi, India	World Cup	6 November 2023	Lost

== Men's Twenty20 International cricket ==
The first instance of an unusual dismissal in T20Is occurred in June 2017, when England's Jason Roy was given out obstructing the field in a match against South Africa.

The T20I between Ghana and Sierra Leone on 17 December 2023 is notable for featuring two separate unusual dismissals. First, Sierra Leone's Abass Gbla made intentional contact with Ghana's Godfred Bakiweyem while Bakiweyem was attempting to run Gbla out, resulting in Gbla being given out obstructing the field. Later, Bakiweyem himself failed to be ready to receive the next ball in the stipulated time following the dismissal of Samson Awiah and was given out timed out.

No.	Player	Dismissal	Runs	Team	Opposition	Venue	Match	Date	Result
1	Jason Roy	Obstructing the field	67	England	South Africa	County Ground, Taunton, England	T20I	23 June 2017	Lost
2	Hassan Rasheed	Obstructing the field	16	Maldives	Qatar	Al Amerat Cricket Stadium, Muscat, Oman	T20I	23 January 2019	Lost
3	Sonam Tobgay	Retired out	24	Bhutan	Maldives	TU Cricket Ground, Kirtipur, Nepal	T20I	7 December 2019	Lost
4	Razmal Shigiwal	Obstructing the field	10	Austria	Czech Republic	Vinoř Cricket Ground, Prague, Czech Republic	T20I	10 July 2022	Lost
5	Hevit Jackson	Retired out	38	France	Czech Republic	Kerava National Cricket Ground, Kerava, Finland	T20I	24 July 2022	Won
6	Hevit Jackson	Retired out	50	France	Estonia	Kerava National Cricket Ground, Kerava, Finland	T20I	30 July 2022	Won
7	Mustapha Suwareh	Retired out	3	Gambia	Ghana	Rwanda Cricket Stadium, Kigali, Rwanda	T20I	8 December 2022	Lost
8	Fanyan Mughal	Hit the ball twice	8	Malta	Romania	Moara Vlasiei Cricket Ground, Moara Vlasiei, Romania	T20I	20 August 2023	Lost
9	Abass Gbla	Obstructing the field	8	Sierra Leone	Ghana	Willowmoore Park, Benoni, South Africa	T20I	17 December 2023	Lost
10	Godfred Bakiweyem	Timed out	0	Ghana	Sierra Leone	Willowmoore Park, Benoni, South Africa	T20I	17 December 2023	Won
11	Niko Davin	Retired out	18	Namibia	England	Sir Vivian Richards Stadium, North Sound, Antigua	T20I	15 June 2024	Lost
12	Christodoulos Bogdanos	Retired out	25	Greece	Cyprus	King George V Sports Ground, Castel, Guernsey	T20I	24 August 2024	Lost
13	Mohamed Azzam	Obstructing the field	11	Maldives	Bhutan	Gelephu International Cricket Ground, Gelephu, Bhutan	T20I	23 October 2024	Won
14	Htet Lin Oo	Obstructing the field	1	Myanmar	Indonesia	Udayana Cricket Ground, Jimbaran, Indonesia	T20I	16 November 2024	Lost
15	Ali Naseer	Retired out	6	United Arab Emirates	Saudi Arabia	West End Park International Cricket Stadium, Doha, Qatar	T20I	20 November 2024	Won
16	Vinoo Balakrishnan	Retired out	101	Botswana	Eswatini	Nigeria Cricket Federation Oval 1, Abuja, Nigeria	T20I	23 November 2024	Won
17	Selim Salau	Retired out	112	Nigeria	Ivory Coast	Nigeria Cricket Federation Oval 1, Abuja, Nigeria	T20I	24 November 2024	Won
18	Khalid Niazi	Retired out	12	Switzerland	Luxembourg	Pierre Werner Cricket Ground, Walferdange	T20I	22 June 2025	Lost
19	Ethan D'Souza	Retired out	34	United Arab Emirates	Nigeria	Entebbe Cricket Oval, Entebbe	T20I	26 July 2025	Won
20	Roston Chase	Retired out	15	West Indies	Pakistan	Central Broward Park, Lauderhill	T20I	3 August 2025	Lost
21	Brendan Taylor	Retired out	123	Zimbabwe	Botswana	Harare Sports Club, Harare	T20I	28 September 2025	Won
22	Benjamin Ito-Davis	Retired out	32	Japan	Qatar	Oman Cricket Academy Ground Turf 2, Al Amarat	T20I	15 October 2025	Lost
23	Zane Green	Retired out	18	Namibia	United States	M. A. Chidambaram Stadium, Chennai	T20I	15 February 2026	Lost
24	Bharani Majji	Retired out	30	Ghana	Malawi	Achimota Oval A, Accra	T20I	25 March 2026	Won
25	Noman Amjad	Retired out	52	France	Croatia	Happy Valley Ground 2, Episkopi	T20I	17 May 2026	Won
26	Shahid Arshad	Retired out	8	Slovenia	Sweden	Happy Valley Ground 2, Episkopi	T20I	19 May 2026	Lost
27	Arjun Shahi	Retired out	8	Cyprus	Switzerland	Happy Valley Ground 2, Episkopi	T20I	20 May 2026	Lost
28	Shankar Panguluri	Retired out	8	Switzerland	France	Happy Valley Ground, Episkopi	T20I	22 May 2026	Lost
29	Roman Mazumder	Retired out	62	Cyprus	Croatia	Happy Valley Ground, Episkopi	T20I	22 May 2026	Lost
30	Muhammad Soban	Retired out	33	Hungary	Belgium	Moara Vlasei Cricket Ground, Ilfov County	T20I	20 June 2026	Lost
31	Junaid Aziz	Retired out	45	Bahrain	Bhutan	Bayuemas Oval, Pandamaran	T20I	6 October 2026	Won
32	Jeevan Santhanam	Retired out	7	Singapore	China	Selangor Turf Club, Kuala Lumpur	T20I	11 October 2026	Won
33	Anand Mongar	Retired out	2	Bhutan	Thailand	Selangor Turf Club, Kuala Lumpur	T20I	14 October 2026	Lost

== Women's ODI cricket ==
In women's ODI cricket, there have been three instances of unusual dismissals: the first came in an ODI match between Sri Lanka and the West Indies in April 2010. Sri Lanka wicket-keeper Dilani Manodara was retired out due to her slow scoring rate in her team's first innings, having taken 70 minutes and 39 balls to score 8 runs.

No.	Player	Dismissal	Runs	Team	Opposition	Venue	Match	Date	Result
1	Dilani Manodara	Retired out	8	Sri Lanka	West Indies	St Paul's Sporting Complex, St Paul's, St Kitts and Nevis	1st ODI	18 April 2010	Lost
2	Thirush Kamini	Obstructing the field	2	India	West Indies	Mulupadu Cricket Ground, Vijayawada, India	2nd ODI	13 November 2016	Won
3	Deandra Dottin	Obstructing the field	13	West Indies	Sri Lanka	National Cricket Stadium, St. George's, Grenada	2nd ODI	22 February 2026	Lost

== Women's Twenty20 International cricket ==
Women's T20I cricket has seen many instances of unusual dismissals. The most unique one came in a match of the 2025 Women's T20 World Cup Asia Qualifier when 10 United Arab Emirates players retired out. The tournament situation made winning vitally important and rain started to fall in the 16th over. Having already scored 192–0 they asked to declare, which is not allowed in the format, prompting the successive retirements to end their innings 4 overs early to save time. They won the game by 163 runs after bowling out Qatar for 29 in 11.1 overs.

No.	Player	Dismissal	Runs	Team	Opposition	Venue	Match	Date	Result
1	Anuja Patil	Obstructing the field	3	India	Bangladesh	Kinrara Academy Oval, Kuala Lumpur	WT20I	10 June 2018	Lost
2	Aisya Eleesa	Retired out	13	Malaysia	Singapore	Selangor Turf Club, Kuala Lumpur	WT20I	10 August 2018	Lost
3	Mary-Anne Musonda	Obstructing the field	21	Zimbabwe	Uganda	Trans Namib Ground, Windhoek	WT20I	22 April 2022	Won
4	Abigail Igbobie	Retired out	4	Nigeria	Rwanda	IPRC Cricket Ground, Kigali	WT20I	16 June 2022	Lost
5	Laura Agatha	Retired out	71	Brazil	Peru	Sao Fernando Polo and Cricket Club, Itaguaí	WT20I	13 October 2022	Won
6	Sarah Etim	Retired out	2	Nigeria	Botswana	Gahanga International Cricket Stadium, Kigali	WT20I	15 June 2023	Lost
7	Bontle Madimabe	Retired out	9	Botswana	Malawi	Botswana Cricket Association Oval 1, Gaborone	WT20I	5 September 2023	Won
8	Indhuja Nandakumar	Retired out	1	United Arab Emirates	Namibia	Dubai International Cricket Stadium, Dubai	WT20I	30 September 2023	Lost
9	Shanzeen Shahzad	Obstructing the field	0	Hong Kong	Nepal	Selangor Turf Club, Seri Kembangan	WT20I	10 February 2024	Lost
10	Zuzana Franova	Retired out	20	Czech Republic	Croatia	Vinoř Cricket Ground, Prague	WT20I	15 June 2024	Lost
11	Thanuja Gedarage	Retired out	7	Cyprus	Estonia	Happy Valley Ground, Episkopi	WT20I	18 June 2024	Won
12	Sasmi Jayakodi	Retired out	13	Cyprus	Estonia	Happy Valley Ground, Episkopi	WT20I	19 June 2024	Won
13	Alicia Aaron	Retired out	2	Cayman Islands	Mexico	Pocos Oval, Poços de Caldas	WT20I	27 September 2024	Lost
14	Sasmi Jayakodi	Retired out	17	Cyprus	Jersey	Happy Valley Ground, Episkopi	WT20I	18 April 2025	Lost
15	Sanja Peles	Retired out	3	Croatia	Malta	Marsa Sports Club, Marsa	WT20I	5 May 2025	Lost
16	Esha Oza	Retired out	113	United Arab Emirates	Qatar	Terdthai Cricket Ground, Bangkok	WT20I	10 May 2025	Won
17	Theertha Satish	Retired out	74	United Arab Emirates	Qatar	Terdthai Cricket Ground, Bangkok	WT20I	10 May 2025	Won
18	Indhuja Nandakumar	Retired out	0	United Arab Emirates	Qatar	Terdthai Cricket Ground, Bangkok	WT20I	10 May 2025	Won
19	Heena Hotchandani	Retired out	0	United Arab Emirates	Qatar	Terdthai Cricket Ground, Bangkok	WT20I	10 May 2025	Won
20	Vaishnave Mahesh	Retired out	0	United Arab Emirates	Qatar	Terdthai Cricket Ground, Bangkok	WT20I	10 May 2025	Won
21	Michelle Botha	Retired out	0	United Arab Emirates	Qatar	Terdthai Cricket Ground, Bangkok	WT20I	10 May 2025	Won
22	Udeni Dona	Retired out	0	United Arab Emirates	Qatar	Terdthai Cricket Ground, Bangkok	WT20I	10 May 2025	Won
23	Athige Silva	Retired out	0	United Arab Emirates	Qatar	Terdthai Cricket Ground, Bangkok	WT20I	10 May 2025	Won
24	Katie Thompson	Retired out	0	United Arab Emirates	Qatar	Terdthai Cricket Ground, Bangkok	WT20I	10 May 2025	Won
25	Lavanya Keny	Retired out	0	United Arab Emirates	Qatar	Terdthai Cricket Ground, Bangkok	WT20I	10 May 2025	Won
26	Favour Eseigbe	Retired out	18	Nigeria	Cameroon	Gahanga B Ground, Kigali	WT20I	7 June 2025	Lost
27	Sila Yildirim	Retired out	59	Turkey	Bulgaria	Vasil Levski National Sports Academy, Sofia	WT20I	8 July 2025	Won
28	Gulce Cengiz	Retired out	54	Turkey	Bulgaria	Vasil Levski National Sports Academy, Sofia	WT20I	8 July 2025	Won
29	Harjivan Bhullar	Retired out	23	Austria	Luxembourg	Pierre Werner Cricket Ground, Walferdange	WT20I	13 September 2025	Won
30	Emma Kirkman	Obstructing the field	12	Austria	Switzerland	Pierre Werner Cricket Ground, Walferdange	WT20I	13 September 2025	Won
31	Cai Yuzhi	Retired out	14	China	Mongolia	Zhejiang University of Technology Cricket Field, Hangzhou	WT20I	25 September 2025	Won
32	Yastika Bhatia	Retired out	33	India	England	County Ground, Bristol	2nd WT20I	30 May 2026	Lost
33	Ritshi Choden	Timed out	0	Bhutan	Nepal	Kolej Tuanku Ja'afar Cricket Oval, Mantin	WT20I	4 June 2026	Lost
34	Mariko Hill	Retired out	41	Hong Kong	Qatar	Kolej Tuanku Ja'afar Cricket Oval, Mantin	WT20I	4 June 2026	Won
35	Fatima Mukadam	Retired out	17	Qatar	Bhutan	Kolej Tuanku Ja'afar Cricket Oval, Mantin	WT20I	6 June 2026	Lost
36	Sarah Etim	Retired out	16	Nigeria	Brazil	Gahanga B Ground, Kigali	WT20I	15 June 2026	Lost
37	Nat Sciver-Brunt	Retired out	48	England	Ireland	Rose Bowl, Southampton	WT20I	16 June 2026	Won
38	Sharmin Akhter	Retired out	10	Bangladesh	India	Old Trafford, Manchester	WT20I	25 June 2026	Lost
39	Jemimah Rodrigues	Retired out	34	India	Australia	Lord's, London	WT20I	28 June 2026	Lost
40	Katerina Frost	Retired out	88	Spain	Switzerland	Embrach Cricket Ground, Embrach	WT20I	30 July 2026	Won
41	Wei Haiting	Retired out	4	China	Indonesia	ZJUT Cricket Field, Hangzhou	WT20I	21 August 2026	Won
42	Maria Polimeri	Retired out	2	Greece	Romania	Moara Vlasei Cricket Ground, Ilfov County	WT20I	28 August 2026	Lost
43	Vera Poglitsch	Retired out	3	Austria	Czech Republic	Moara Vlasei Cricket Ground, Ilfov County	WT20I	28 August 2026	Won
44	Erika Kuncova	Retired out	26	Czech Republic	Guernsey	Moara Vlasei Cricket Ground, Ilfov County	WT20I	29 August 2026	Lost
45	Elise Millington	Retired out	26	Guernsey	Czech Republic	Moara Vlasei Cricket Ground, Ilfov County	WT20I	29 August 2026	Won
46	Phannita Maya	Retired out	15	Thailand	Pakistan	Kōrogi Sports Park, Nisshin	WT20I	17 September 2026	Lost
