= West Indies women's cricket team in India in 2016–17 =

International cricket tour

	India women	West Indies women
- Dates: 10 – 22 November 2016
Captains	Mithali Raj (ODIs); Harmanpreet Kaur (T20Is)	Stafanie Taylor

One Day International series
- Results: India women won the 3-match series 3–0
Most runs	Veda Krishnamurthy (131)	Merissa Aguilleira (89)
Most wickets	Rajeshwari Gayakwad (9)	Shakera Selman (4)

Twenty20 International series
- Results: West Indies women won the 3-match series 3–0
Most runs	Harmanpreet Kaur (171)	Stafanie Taylor (181)
Most wickets	Shikha Pandey (5)	Deandra Dottin (5)

The West Indies women's cricket team toured India in November 2016. The tour consisted of a series of three One Day Internationals which were part of the 2014–16 ICC Women's Championship and three Twenty20 Internationals. India won the ODI series 3–0 and the West Indies won the T20I series 3–0.

== Squads ==
ODIs		T20Is	
India	West Indies	India	West Indies
Mithali Raj (c); Ekta Bisht; Rajeshwari Gayakwad; Jhulan Goswami; Thirush Kamini; Harmanpreet Kaur; Veda Krishnamurthy; Smriti Mandhana; Mona Meshram; Shikha Pandey; Sukanya Parida; Deepti Sharma; Devika Vaidya; Sushma Verma (wk); Poonam Yadav	Stafanie Taylor (c); Anisa Mohammed (vc); Merissa Aguilleira (wk); Shemaine Campbelle; Shamilia Connell; Britney Cooper; Deandra Dottin; Afy Fletcher; Kycia Knight; Hayley Matthews; Chedean Nation; Shaquana Quintyne; Shakera Selman; Tremayne Smartt	Harmanpreet Kaur (c); Ekta Bisht; Preeti Bose; Jhulan Goswami; Mansi Joshi; Veda Krishnamurthy; Smriti Mandhana; Sabbhineni Meghana; Shikha Pandey; Nuzhat Parween (wk); Anuja Patil; Mithali Raj; Deepti Sharma; Vellaswamy Vanitha; Poonam Yadav	Stafanie Taylor (c); Anisa Mohammed (vc); Merissa Aguilleira (wk); Shemaine Campbelle; Shamilia Connell; Britney Cooper; Deandra Dottin; Afy Fletcher; Kycia Knight; Hayley Matthews; Chedean Nation; Shaquana Quintyne; Shakera Selman; Tremayne Smartt

== ODI series ==
=== 1st ODI ===
ICC Women's Championship
10 November 2016
Scorecard

West Indies; 131 (42.4 overs)	v	India; 133/4 (39.1 overs)
Merissa Aguilleira 42* (77); Rajeshwari Gayakwad 4/21 (9.4 overs)		Veda Krishnamurthy 52* (70); Shakera Selman 2/11 (9 overs)

India Women won by 6 wickets
Mulapadu Cricket Ground, Vijayawada
Umpires: Rajesh Deshpande (Ind) and Rajiv Risodkar (Ind)

- West Indies Women won the toss and elected to bat.
- ICC Women's Championship points: India Women 2, West Indies Women 0.

=== 2nd ODI ===
ICC Women's Championship
13 November 2016
Scorecard

West Indies; 153/7 (50 overs)	v	India; 154/5 (38 overs)
Deandra Dottin 63 (101); Jhulan Goswami 2/28 (10 overs); Ekta Bisht 2/28 (10 overs)		Mithali Raj 45 (51); Shakera Selman 1/18 (7 overs)

India Women won by 5 wickets
Mulapadu Cricket Ground, Vijayawada
Umpires: Rajesh Deshpande (Ind) and Rajiv Risodkar (Ind)

- India Women won the toss and elected to field.
- Thirush Kamini (Ind) was given out obstructing the field. This was the first instance in Women's One Day International cricket and only the second unusual dismissal in Women's One Day International cricket.
- ICC Women's Championship points: India Women 2, West Indies Women 0.

=== 3rd ODI ===
ICC Women's Championship
16 November 2016
Scorecard

India; 199/6 (50 overs)	v	West Indies; 184 (49.1 overs)
Veda Krishnamurthy 71 (79); Chedean Nation 2/21 (7 overs)		Kycia Knight 55 (94); Rajeshwari Gayakwad 4/34 (10 overs)

India Women won by 15 runs
Mulapadu Cricket Ground, Vijayawada
Umpires: Rajesh Deshpande (Ind) and Rajiv Risodkar (Ind)

- West Indies Women won the toss and elected to field.
- Sukanya Parida and Devika Vaidya (Ind Women) both made their WODI debuts.
- ICC Women's Championship points: India Women 2, West Indies Women 0.

== T20I series ==
=== 1st T20I ===
18 November 2016
Scorecard

India; 150/4 (20 overs)	v	West Indies; 154/4 (19.1 overs)
Harmanpreet Kaur 68* (50); Shakera Selman 2/26 (4 overs)		Stafanie Taylor 90 (51); Shikha Pandey 3/31 (4 overs)

West Indies Women won by 6 wickets
Mulapadu Cricket Ground, Vijayawada
Umpires: Anil Dandekar (Ind) and Piyush Khakhar (Ind)

- India Women won the toss and elected to bat.
- Nuzhat Parween and Preeti Bose (India Women) made their WT20I debuts.

=== 2nd T20I ===
20 November 2016
Scorecard

West Indies; 137/5 (20 overs)	v	India; 106 (18.1 overs)
Stafanie Taylor 47 (45); Shikha Pandey 2/29 (4 overs)		Harmanpreet Kaur 43 (37); Anisa Mohammed 3/23 (4 overs)

West Indies Women won by 31 runs
Mulapadu Cricket Ground, Vijayawada
Umpires: Anil Dandekar (Ind) and Piyush Khakhar (Ind)

- India Women won the toss and elected to field.
- Sabbhineni Meghana (India Women) made her WT20I debut.

=== 3rd T20I ===
22 November 2016
Scorecard

West Indies; 139/4 (20 overs)	v	India; 124/3 (20 overs)
Hayley Matthews 47 (22); Poonam Yadav 2/25 (4 overs)		Harmanpreet Kaur 60 (51); Hayley Matthews 1/28 (7 overs)

West Indies Women won by 15 runs
Mulapadu Cricket Ground, Vijayawada
Umpires: Anil Dandekar (Ind) and Piyush Khakhar (Ind)

- West Indies Women won the toss and elected to bat.
