= 2017 ICC Champions Trophy warm-up matches =

Cricket matches preceding a 2017 tournament

This is a list of warm-up matches for the 2017 ICC Champions Trophy.

The matches took place at two of the grounds to be used for the main tournament (Edgbaston and The Oval) between 26–30 May 2017. England and South Africa played a bilateral ODI series at the same time so did not take part, leaving each of the other 6 qualified teams to play the other 2 teams not in their Champions Trophy group. These warm-up matches had rules that were slightly different from normal, so are not recognised as ODIs. A team could use up to 15 players in a match, but only 11 could bat (or field at any one time) in each innings.

== Matches ==
26 May 2017
10:30
Scorecard

| Sri Lanka; 318/7 (50 overs) | v | Australia; 319/8 (49.4 overs) |
| Angelo Mathews 95 (106); Moisés Henriques 3/46 (8 overs) | | Aaron Finch 137 (109); Nuwan Pradeep 3/57 (9 overs) |

Australia won by 2 wickets
The Oval, London
Umpires: Ian Gould (Eng) and Sundaram Ravi (Ind)

- Australia won the toss and elected to field.

27 May 2017
10:30
Scorecard

| Bangladesh; 341/9 (50 overs) | v | Pakistan; 342/8 (49.3 overs) |
| Tamim Iqbal 102 (93); Junaid Khan 4/73 (9 overs) | | Shoaib Malik 72 (66); Mehedi Hasan Miraz 2/30 (4 overs) |

Pakistan won by 2 wickets
Edgbaston, Birmingham
Umpires: Richard Kettleborough (Eng) and Paul Reiffel (Aus)

- Bangladesh won the toss and elected to bat.

28 May 2017
10:30
Scorecard

| New Zealand; 189 (38.4 overs) | v | India; 129/3 (26 overs) |
| Luke Ronchi 66 (63); Bhuvneshwar Kumar 3/28 (6.4 overs) | | Virat Kohli 52* (55); James Neesham 1/11 (3 overs) |

India won by 45 runs (D/L method)
The Oval, London
Umpires: Aleem Dar (Pak) and Bruce Oxenford (Aus)

- New Zealand won the toss and elected to bat.
- Rain prevented any further play.
- India were 45 runs ahead of the DLS target of 85 runs.

29 May 2017
10:30
Scorecard

| Australia; 57/1 (10.2 overs) | v | Pakistan |
| Aaron Finch 36* (36); Mohammad Amir 1/9 (4 overs) |

No result
Edgbaston, Birmingham
Umpires: Kumar Dharmasena (SL) and Richard Illingworth (Eng)

- Australia won the toss and elected to bat.
- The match was reduced to 34 overs per side due to rain.
- Rain prevented any further play.

30 May 2017
10:30
Scorecard

| Sri Lanka; 356/8 (50 overs) | v | New Zealand; 359/4 (46.1 overs) |
| Upul Tharanga 110 (104); Trent Boult 2/47 (5 overs) | | Martin Guptill 116 (76); Seekkuge Prasanna 2/63 (10 overs) |

New Zealand won by 6 wickets
Edgbaston, Birmingham
Umpires: Richard Illingworth (Eng) and Richard Kettleborough (Eng)

- New Zealand won the toss and elected to field.

30 May 2017
10:30
Scorecard

| India; 324/7 (50 overs) | v | Bangladesh; 84 (23.5 overs) |
| Dinesh Karthik 94 (77); Rubel Hossain 3/50 (9 overs) | | Mehedi Hasan Miraz 24 (34); Bhuvneshwar Kumar 3/13 (5 overs) |

India won by 240 runs
The Oval, London
Umpires: Marais Erasmus (SA) and Nigel Llong (Eng)

- Bangladesh won the toss and elected to field.
