= 2014–15 Senior Women's Cricket Inter Zonal Two Day Game =

- Dates: 18 February 2015 – 3 March 2015
- Administrator(s): BCCI
- Cricket format: First-class cricket
- Tournament format(s): Round-robin tournament
- Host(s): Cricket Association of Bengal
- Champions: Central Zone (1st title)
- Runners-up: East Zone
- Participants: 5
- Matches: 10

The 2014–15 Senior Women's Cricket Inter Zonal Two Day Game was the inaugural season of India's Inter Zonal women's first-class competition. Five teams representing regions (or "zones") of India competed in a round-robin league, playing four two-day matches. All matches were held at grounds in Kolkata. Central Zone won the tournament, winning three matches on first innings. The tournament replaced the Inter Zone Women's One Day Competition.

== Competition format ==
The five teams played in a round-robin league, therefore playing four matches each. Matches were played using a two-day format.

The league worked on a points system with positions within the league being based on the total points. Points were awarded as follows:

Win: 6 points.
Tie: 3 points.
Loss: 0 points.
Drawn (lead after first innings): 3 points
Drawn (trail after first innings): 1 point
Drawn (no decision on first innings): 1 point
Abandoned without a ball bowled: 1 point

If points in the final table are equal, teams are separated by most wins and then by their quotient (runs per wicket for divided by runs per wicket against).

== Standings ==
Team	Pld	W	L	DWF	DLF	ND	Pts	Quot
Central Zone (C)	4	0	0	3	1	0	10	1.615
East Zone	4	0	0	2	1	1	8	1.241
North Zone	4	0	0	1	2	1	6	0.996
South Zone	4	0	0	1	2	1	6	0.745
West Zone	4	0	0	0	1	3	4	0.693

Source: CricketArchive

== Fixtures ==
=== Round 1 ===
18 – 19 February 2015
Scorecard

East Zone	v	North Zone
300/6d (111.3 overs); Swagatika Rath 67 (91); Sneh Rana 3/51 (29 overs)		214 (75.3 overs); Latika Kumari 113 (177); Ritu Singh 4/33 (12 overs)

Match drawn
Eden Gardens, Kolkata
Umpires: GS Ananth Ramakrishnan and KR Vasuki

- East Zone won the toss and elected to bat.
- East Zone lead on first innings.
- Points: East Zone 3, North Zone 0.

18 – 19 February 2015
Scorecard

West Zone	v	South Zone
273/8d (92 overs); Sheral Rozario 54 (119); Rajeshwari Gayakwad 5/60 (25 overs)		209 (91 overs); Krishnappa Rakshitha 64 (191); Devika Vaidya 3/42 (23 overs)

Match drawn
Jadavpur University Second Campus Ground, Kolkata
Umpires: Vashistha Gajanand and Lund Vikas

- South Zone won the toss and elected to field.
- No lead on first innings.
- Points: South Zone 1, West Zone 1.

=== Round 2 ===
21 – 22 February 2015
Scorecard

South Zone	v	North Zone
86 (39.5 overs); Shikha Pandey 19 (35); Reema Malhotra 4/5 (6.5 overs)		140 (54.3 overs); Sushma Verma 31 (35); Rupali Chavan 5/43 (15 overs)
151/7 (75 overs); Krishnappa Rakshitha 28 (124); Sneh Rana 3/30 (18 overs)

Match drawn
Jadavpur University Second Campus Ground, Kolkata
Umpires: Vashistha Gajanand and Lund Vikas

- South Zone won the toss and elected to bat.
- North Zone lead on first innings.
- Points: North Zone 3, South Zone 1.

22 – 23 February 2015
Scorecard

Central Zone	v	East Zone
220 (97 overs); Varsha Choudhary 87 (257); Sushreedivyadarshani Pradhan 3/41 (19 overs)		129 (73.2 overs); Kadambini Mohakhud 52 (147); Varsha Choudhary 3/18 (12 overs)

Match drawn
Eden Gardens, Kolkata
Umpires: GS Ananth Ramakrishnan and KR Vasuki

- East Zone won the toss and elected to field.
- Central Zone lead on first innings.
- Points: Central Zone 3, East Zone 1.

=== Round 3 ===
24 – 25 February 2015
Scorecard

South Zone	v	Central Zone
202 (99.4 overs); Veda Krishnamurthy 76 (139); Shubhlakshmi Sharma 3/16 (16 overs)		95 (54 overs); Samantha Lobatto 29 (64); Shikha Pandey 3/21 (16 overs)
		25/0 (15 overs) (f/o); Deepti Sharma 17* (59)

Match drawn
Bengal Cricket Academy Ground, Kalyani
Umpires: GS Ananth Ramakrishnan and KR Vasuki

- Central Zone won the toss and elected to field.
- South Zone lead on first innings.
- Points: South Zone 3, Central Zone 1.

24 – 25 February 2015
Scorecard

North Zone	v	West Zone
277/5d (100 overs); Priya Punia 95 (266); Neha Chavda 2/50 (17 overs)		139/9 (93 overs); Smriti Mandhana 41 (129); Preeti Bose 4/31 (29 overs)

Match drawn
Jadavpur University Second Campus Ground, Kolkata
Umpires: Vashistha Gajanand and Lund Vikas

- North Zone won the toss and elected to bat.
- No lead on first innings.
- Points: North Zone 1, West Zone 1.

=== Round 4 ===
27 – 28 February 2015
Scorecard

Central Zone	v	North Zone
190 (105.4 overs); Mithali Raj 66 (181); Preeti Bose 4/51 (32 overs)		107 (63.5 overs); Priya Punia 34 (110); Deepti Sharma 6/33 (20.5 overs)
23/0 (3 overs); Punam Raut 16* (13)

Match drawn
Eastern Railways Sports Complex, Kolkata
Umpires: GS Ananth Ramakrishnan and K Kusha Prakash

- Central Zone won the toss and elected to bat.
- Central Zone lead on first innings.
- Points: Central Zone 3, North Zone 1.

27 – 28 February 2015
Scorecard

West Zone	v	East Zone
286/4d (90 overs); Smriti Mandhana 109 (198); Madhusmita Behera 1/12 (3 overs)		195/5 (98 overs); Madhusmita Behera 67* (148); Sarika Koli 1/14 (11 overs)

Match drawn
Jadavpur University Second Campus Ground, Kolkata
Umpires: S Rama Krishna and M Ramesh Kumar

- West Zone won the toss and elected to bat.
- No lead on first innings.
- Points: East Zone 3, West Zone 1.

=== Round 5 ===
2 – 3 March 2015
Scorecard

West Zone	v	Central Zone
107 (65.4 overs); Shivali Shinde 28 (88); Poonam Yadav 4/22 (16 overs)		254/6d (96.3 overs); Nuzhat Parween 101* (264); Sheral Rozario 2/30 (14 overs)
24/1 (14.4 overs); Smriti Mandhana 15* (47); Gouher Sultana 1/0 (0.4 overs)

Match drawn
Eden Gardens, Kolkata
Umpires: S Rama Krishna and M Ramesh Kumar

- West Zone won the toss and elected to bat.
- Central Zone lead on first innings.
- Points: Central Zone 3, West Zone 1.

2 – 3 March 2015
Scorecard

East Zone	v	South Zone
304/7d (105.4 overs); Mandira Mahapatra 76 (97); Veda Krishnamurthy 2/23 (8 overs)		141 (55.5 overs); Veda Krishnamurthy 56 (78); Saiqa Ishaque 3/25 (7.5 overs)
15/2 (5.3 overs); Rima Chakraborty 11* (19); Krishnappa Rakshitha 1/5 (3 overs)

Match drawn
Jadavpur University Second Campus Ground, Kolkata
Umpires: GS Ananth Ramakrishnan and K Kusha Prakash

- East Zone won the toss and elected to bat.
- East Zone lead on first innings.
- Points: East Zone 3, South Zone 1.
