= 2017–18 Senior Women's Cricket Inter Zonal Three Day Game =

- Dates: 18 March – 5 April 2018
- Administrator(s): BCCI
- Cricket format: First-class
- Tournament format(s): Round-robin tournament
- Host(s): India
- Champions: North Zone (1st title)
- Participants: 5
- Matches: 10
- Most runs: Thirush Kamini (353)
- Most wickets: Preeti Bose (21)

The 2017–18 Senior Women's Cricket Inter Zonal Three Day Game was the fourth season of India's Inter Zonal women's first-class competition. The tournament took place from 18 March to 5 April 2018. Five zonal teams participated in the tournament, facing each other in a round-robin format in three-day matches. All matches took place in Thiruvananthapuram. North Zone won the tournament and with it their first title.

== Competition format ==
The five teams played in a round-robin league, therefore playing four matches. Matches were played using a three-day format.

The league worked on a points system with positions within the divisions being based on the total points. Points were awarded as follows:

Win: 6 points.
Tie: 3 points.
Loss: 0 points.
Drawn (lead after first innings): 3 points.
Drawn (trail after first innings): 1 point.
Drawn (no decision on first innings): 1 point.
Abandoned without a ball bowled: 1 point.

If points in the final table are equal, teams are separated by most wins, then net run rate.

== Standings ==
Team	Pld	W	L	DWF	DLF	ND	BP	Pts	NRR
North Zone (C)	4	2	0	2	0	0	1	19	+0.185
South Zone	4	2	1	0	1	0	0	13	–0.354
West Zone	4	1	2	1	0	0	1	10	–0.445
Central Zone	4	1	2	0	1	0	0	7	+0.729
East Zone	4	0	1	1	2	0	0	5	–0.084

Source: CricketArchive

== Fixtures ==
=== Round 1 ===
18 – 20 March 2018
Scorecard

East Zone	v	North Zone
54 (36.1 overs); Mouchaity Debnath 22 (38); Renuka Singh 6/23 (12 overs)		194 (93.5 overs); Priya Punia 73 (238); Devyani Prasad 3/43 (16.5 overs)
305/7 (131 overs); Madhusmita Behera 114 (312); Tanuja Kanwar 3/60 (36 overs)

Match drawn
Greenfield International Stadium, Thiruvananthapuram
Umpires: M Ashwin Kumar and Mohit Krishnadas

- East Zone won the toss and elected to bat.
- North Zone lead on first innings.
- Points: North Zone 3, East Zone 1.

18 – 20 March 2018
Scorecard

South Zone	v	West Zone
203 (99.4 overs); Sobhana Asha 63 (162); Renuka Chaudhari 4/17 (21 overs)		212 (101 overs); Shweta Jadhav 81 (148); Gouher Sultana 3/70 (34 overs)
89 (50.3 overs); Nagarajan Niranjana 26 (48); Renuka Chaudhari 3/8 (10.3 overs)		82/0 (13 overs); Palak Patel 46* (46)

West Zone won by 10 wickets
St Xavier's College Ground, Thiruvananthapuram
Umpires: Sumit Bansal and Vikas Bhatt

- South Zone won the toss and elected to bat.
- Points: West Zone 7, South Zone 0.

=== Round 2 ===
22 – 24 March 2018
Scorecard

Central Zone	v	East Zone
155 (58.5 overs); Punam Raut 55 (81); Devyani Prasad 4/27 (14 overs)		248 (137 overs); Tanusree Sarkar 84 (227); Priti Yadav 3/42 (30 overs)
151/5 (60 overs); Shweta Bishnoi 48 (84); Sushree Dibyadarshini 2/17 (15 overs)

Match drawn
Greenfield International Stadium, Thiruvananthapuram
Umpires: P Bhanuprakash and Nagaraj Ramesh

- East Zone won the toss and elected to field.
- East Zone lead on first innings.
- Points: East Zone 3, Central Zone 1.

22 – 24 March 2018
Scorecard

South Zone	v	North Zone
204 (93.3 overs); Sobhana Asha 55 (155); Tanuja Kanwar 3/52 (29 overs)		218/9d (93.1 overs); Mandeep Kaur 65 (174); Nagarajan Niranjana 4/52 (18 overs)
96/4 (63 overs); Dayalan Hemalatha 31 (125); Harleen Deol 3/22 (17 overs)

Match drawn
St Xavier's College Ground, Thiruvananthapuram
Umpires: Bhanushali Ashish and Sandeep Vasudeo Chavan

- South Zone won the toss and elected to bat.
- North Zone lead on first innings.
- Points: North Zone 3, South Zone 1.

=== Round 3 ===
26 – 27 March 2018
Scorecard

West Zone	v	North Zone
131 (63.4 overs); Palak Patel 32 (81); Preeti Bose 3/31 (19 overs)		243 (85.5 overs); Neha Tanwar 82 (150); Renuka Chaudhari 4/60 (21.5 overs)
104 (63.4 overs); Shweta Jadhav 35 (131); Preeti Bose 5/26 (21.4 overs)

North Zone won by an innings and 8 runs
St Xavier's College Ground, Thiruvananthapuram
Umpires: Viswajith B and Ramachandran Kannan

- North Zone won the toss and elected to field.
- Points: North Zone 7, West Zone 0.

26 – 28 March 2018
Scorecard

South Zone	v	Central Zone
125 (59.3 overs); Dayalan Hemalatha 32 (62); Meghna Singh 3/20 (7.3 overs)		100 (59.3 overs); Shweta Bishnoi 29 (80); Sravanthi Naidu 6/7 (14.3 overs)
154 (86 overs); Nagarajan Niranjana 47 (133); Shivangiraj Singh 4/42 (32 overs)		74 (31.4 overs); Priti Yadav 19 (32); Nagarajan Niranjana 3/12 (6 overs)

South Zone won by 105 runs
Greenfield International Stadium, Thiruvananthapuram
Umpires: Arun Kumar Basa and Vaibhav Mohan Dhokre

- Central Zone won the toss and elected to field.
- Points: South Zone 6, Central Zone 0.

=== Round 4 ===
30 March – 1 April 2018
Scorecard

Central Zone	v	North Zone
140 (46.3 overs); Thirush Kamini 55 (110); Tanuja Kanwar 5/36 (13 overs)		183 (107.1 overs); Renuka Singh 44 (64); Shivangiraj Singh 4/52 (42.1 overs)
92 (46.1 overs); Thirush Kamini 36 (111); Preeti Bose 7/32 (21.1 overs)		50/1 (13.4 overs); Priya Punia 28* (35); Thirush Kamini 1/13 (2 overs)

North Zone won by 9 wickets
Greenfield International Stadium, Thiruvananthapuram
Umpires: Piyush Khakhar and Chandrakant Mhase

- North Zone won the toss and elected to field.
- Points: North Zone 6, Central Zone 0.

30 March – 1 April 2018
Scorecard

West Zone	v	East Zone
190 (94.5 overs); Prajakta Shirwadkar 45 (166); Monika Das 7/23 (19.5 overs)		106 (59.1 overs); Tanusree Sarkar 23 (63); Renuka Chaudhari 7/40 (23.1 overs)
140/8d (60 overs); Palak Patel 42 (102); Devyani Prasad 4/47 (17 overs)		126/2 (42.2 overs); Tanusree Sarkar 61* (127); Shweta Haranhalli 1/19 (8 overs)

Match drawn
St Xavier's College Ground, Thiruvananthapuram
Umpires: Ajith Kumar and Rajeev Godara

- East Zone won the toss and elected to field.
- West Zone lead on first innings.
- Points: West Zone 3, East Zone 1.

=== Round 5 ===
3 – 5 April 2018
Scorecard

West Zone	v	Central Zone
137 (80.4 overs); Binaisha Surti 42 (75); Shweta Bishnoi 4/31 (23.4 overs)		183 (65.2 overs); Thirush Kamini 80 (158); Krutika Chaudhari 5/61 (22.2 overs)
188 (87.1 overs); Humaira Kazi 81* (118); Shivangiraj Singh 5/46 (32 overs)		143/2 (26.5 overs); Thirush Kamini 91* (85); Krutika Chaudhari 2/40 (11 overs)

Central Zone won by 8 wickets
St Xavier's College Ground, Thiruvananthapuram
Umpires: Ajith Kumar and Sivakumar A

- West Zone won the toss and elected to bat.
- Points: Central Zone 6, West Zone 0.

3 – 5 April 2018
Scorecard

South Zone	v	East Zone
216 (111 overs); Lakhmi Nethra 65 (215); Saiqa Ishaque 4/49 (28 overs)		99 (46.3 overs); Monika Das 23 (30); Gouher Sultana 7/36 (16.3 overs)
107/6d (42.4 overs); Lakhmi Nethra 71* (132); Sushree Dibyadarshini 2/26 (7 overs)		105 (38 overs); Madhuri Mehta 50 (104); Ananya Upendran 3/16 (8 overs)

South Zone won by 119 runs
Greenfield International Stadium, Thiruvananthapuram
Umpires: Rajeev Godara and Milind Pathak

- East Zone won the toss and elected to field.
- Points: South Zone 6, East Zone 0.
