= Mohinder Amarnath =

Indian cricket player

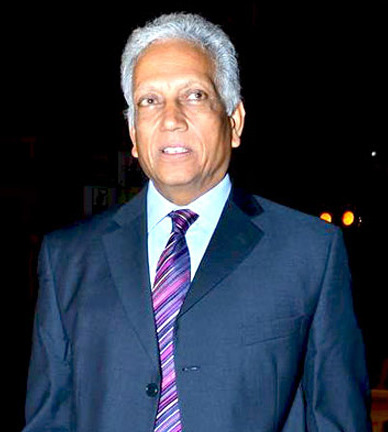
- Amarnath in 2012

Personal information
- Full name: Mohinder Amarnath Bhardwaj
- Born: 24 September 1950 (age 76); Patiala, Punjab, India
- Nickname: Jimmy
- Batting: Right-handed
- Bowling: Right-arm medium
- Role: Batting all-rounder
- Relatives: Amarnath family

International information
- National side: India (1969–1989)
- Test debut (cap 125): 24 December 1969 v Australia
- Last Test: 11 January 1988 v West Indies
- ODI debut (cap 15): 7 June 1975 v England
- Last ODI: 30 October 1989 v West Indies

Domestic team information
- Years: Team
- 1969–1974: Punjab
- 1974–1989: Delhi
- 1984: Baroda
- 1984: Wiltshire

Career statistics
Competition	Test	ODI
Matches	69	85
Runs scored	4,378	1,924
Batting average	42.50	30.53
100s/50s	11/24	2/13
Top score	138	102*
Balls bowled	3,676	2,730
Wickets	32	46
Bowling average	55.68	42.84
5 wickets in innings	0	0
10 wickets in match	0	0
Best bowling	4/63	3/12
Catches/stumpings	47/–	23/–
Medal record
Men's Cricket
Representing India
ICC Cricket World Cup
Winner	1983 England and Wales
ACC Asia Cup
Winner	1988 Bangladesh
- Source: ESPNcricinfo, 8 October 2009

Mohinder Amarnath Bhardwaj (born 24 September 1950) is a former Indian cricketer and cricket analyst. He is the son of Lala Amarnath, the first post-independence captain of India. Mohinder was the vice captain of the Indian team that won the 1983 Cricket World Cup, where he was the player of the final. He was also a part of the Indian squad which won the 1985 World Championship of Cricket.

Mohinder is commonly mentioned by players and cricket pundits as the best Indian batsman against express pace. In 2009, he received the C. K. Nayudu Lifetime Achievement Award, the highest honour Indian board can bestow on a former player.

== Early life ==
Mohinder was born on 24 September 1950 in Patiala as the second eldest son of Lala Amarnath and Kailash Kumari. His elder brother, Surinder is a former international cricketer while his younger brother Rajinder is a former first-class cricketer. He also has two sisters, Kamala and Dolly.

== Education ==
Mohinder Amarnath did his schooling at MB High School Mandir Marg Delhi. He went to SGTB Khalsa College, Delhi University for his graduation.

== Career ==
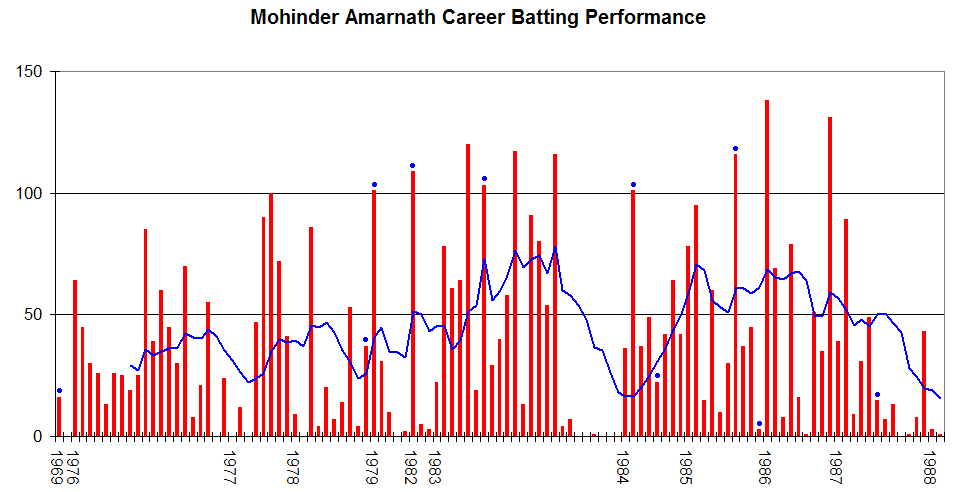
Mohinder Amarnath's career performance graph.

Mohinder made his debut against Australia at Chennai in December 1969, as a quick-bowling all rounder. At his peak he was a top order batsman who mainly played at No. 3 for India, and was both an attacking and defensive batsmen who reinvented himself several times over the course of his career. He was also handy with the ball, bowling swingers and cutters with great skill and control. He had a unique run-up where he slowed down as he reached the bowling crease.

Mohinder Amarnath played 69 Tests scoring 4,378 runs at a batting average of 42.50, with 11 hundreds and 24 fifties, and claimed 32 wickets at a bowling average of 55.68 apiece. In 85 One Day Internationals, he scored 1,924 runs at an average of 30.53 and a highest score of 102 n.o. and claimed 46 wickets at 42.84 apiece.

== Accolades ==
Fiery fast bowlers Imran Khan of Pakistan and Malcolm Marshall of West Indies have praised his batsmanship, courage and ability to endure and master pain. In 1982–83 Mohinder played 11 Test matches against Pakistan (5) and the West Indies (6) and scored over 1000 runs in the two series.

In his book "Idols", Indian legend and compatriot Sunil Gavaskar described Mohinder Amarnath as the finest batsman in the world.

Mohinder made his first test century at Perth at the WACA (the fastest and bounciest wicket in the world) batting against Jeff Thomson. He followed this test century with another 10 more against top class fast bowling.

Imran Khan regarded Mohinder so highly that in his book "All Round View" he went on record to say that in the 1982–83 season, Mohinder was quite simply the best batsman in the world. Imran further went on to state that Mohinder should have played non-stop for India right from his debut in 1969 to the time he retired. (After his debut series in 1969, he had to wait until 1975 to make it into the team).

== 1982–83 series in Pakistan ==
This series saw Imran Khan at his lethal best, supported by the canny Sarfraz Nawaz. In match after match India crumbled against the fiery pace of Pakistan, losing the Second, third and fourth tests 3–0 . Imran Khan who took 40 wickets in the series was jointly awarded "Man of the Series" with Mohinder Amarnath. The catastrophic series for India hastened the end of the career of master batsman Gundappa Viswanath. Mohinder Amarnath was the sole saving grace for the Indian batting line-up for the series as a whole. (An aside – Sunil Gavaskar carried his bat in one innings of the series. Sunil Gavaskar scored 434 runs ).

== 1983 World Cup Performance ==
Mohinder Amarnath is noted for his performance in the 1983 Cricket World Cup. He was awarded "Man of the Match" in the final and semi-final, playing a star role in leading India to their first ever One Day International title and first World Cup win.

In the semi-final against England his accurate seam bowling fetched him the top-order wickets of David Gower and Mike Gatting. He gave away only 27 runs in his 12 overs, for an average of a miserly 2.25 an over, the lowest among all Indian bowlers. Returning to bat, he scored 46 runs to give India a solid foundation. He was named the Man of the Match.

In the final, India batted first against the West Indies which arguably boasted the world's best bowling attack comprising Malcolm Marshall, Michael Holding, Andy Roberts and Joel Garner. India did not fare well, with the entire team being dismissed for a paltry score of 183 in 54.4 overs, well short of the allotted 60 overs. Amarnath's calm and composed batting against West Indian fast bowling gave the Indian innings some much needed stability. He occupied the crease for the longest period (80 balls) and scored 26 runs. Though normally in limited over matches a long stint at the crease is not necessarily a good thing, given that India did not last the entire 60 overs Amarnath's innings gave the batsmen at the other end the opportunity to score. Krishnamachari Srikkanth top-scored with 38 runs, followed by Sandeep Patil (27 runs). After the poor batting performance India's chances were deemed almost non-existent. However, the Indian bowling exploited the weather and pitch conditions, conducive for swing bowling perfectly to bowl out the West Indies for just 140, thus winning the finals by 43 runs. Amarnath and Madan Lal were the joint highest wicket takers with 3 wickets each. As he had been in the semi-final, Amarnath was once again the most economical bowler, conceding only 12 runs in his 7 overs for an average of 1.71 per over. Again, just like the semi-final, Amarnath was declared the Man of the Match. Amarnath also had the distinction of bagging the match winning wicket. As the vice-captain of the team, he held the World Cup aloft in a famous photograph along with his captain and friend, Indian cricketing legend Kapil Dev.

== Trials and tribulations ==
Except for the period 1982–83, Mohinder never held a steady place in the Indian Test team and would frequently get dropped. Mohinder is known as the Comeback Man of Indian Cricket. During his two decades at the top, he was dropped from the Indian team on several occasions and each time he fought his way back with sterling performances, playing excellent domestic cricket and making it hard for the national selectors to ignore him.

He was well-known for his batting technique, temperament and skill. He even experimented with a side-on batting stance, where one foot was placed at an angle to the crease, giving the body a more open stance with a better view of the bowler.

== Character and Courage ==
Amarnath was noted for his personality, courage and determination. West Indian cricketing great Vivian Richards called him "one of the nicest men to have ever played the game" and former Australian Test opening batsman David Boon said "Concede didn't seem to be in his vocabulary".

Gideon Haigh writing in The Age says: "In an era replete with fast bowling and unrestricted in use of the bouncer, he never stopped hooking – despite many incentives to do so. He received a hairline fracture of the skull from Richard Hadlee, was knocked unconscious by Imran Khan, had teeth knocked out by Malcolm Marshall and was hit in the jaw so painfully by Jeff Thomson in Perth that he could eat only ice cream for lunch. 'What separated Jimmy from the others,' Michael Holding said, 'was his great ability to withstand pain . . . A fast bowler knows when a batsman is in pain. But Jimmy would stand up and continue.' ".

In the Bridgetown Test during India's tour of the West Indies in 1982–83, Amarnath had to retire for stitches after being hit on the head. On returning to the game, he faced one of history's most lethal fast bowlers Michael Holding. It was a given that Holding would try to intimidate Amarnath by bowling a bouncer, and indeed he did so. While most would expect that a batsman in such a situation would do the prudent thing and duck, instead Amarnath stood his ground and hooked the ball to the boundary. However the West Indies bowling attack comprising Malcolm Marshall at his best, Michael Holding, Winston Davis and Wayne Daniel would wreak their most lethal vengeance upon Amarnath during their 1983/84 tour of India by restricting him to only 1 run in six innings, during which Holding scalped Amarnath three times for a duck. Amarnath had scores of 0,0,0,1,0,0 and was hence dropped just months after his career-high success at the 1983 World Cup.

He played an important role in famous chase in Queen's Park Oval, Port of Spain, Trinidad in 1976 tour. He made 85 in the second innings taking India to the brink of historic win.

Amarnath was noted for his conflicts with the Indian cricketing political establishment, famously having called the selectors a "bunch of jokers". This often resulted in his exclusion from the Indian team also.

== Trivia ==
Mohinder had some unique dismissals. He is the only Indian who has been dismissed on handling the ball. He was dismissed on 9 February 1986 also making him the first one to be dismissed for handling the ball in One-Day Internationals. He is also the only Indian to be dismissed for obstructing the field in One-Day Internationals. He has also been dismissed 'hit wicket'.

He is the only International Cricketer in the world to be given out both for handling the ball and obstructing the field in his career

He displayed the unique superstition of carrying a red handkerchief visibly in his trouser pocket while batting.

== Cricket Coaching ==
Mohinder Amarnath presented a popular weekly cricket coaching TV programme in the late 80s/early 90s. The program went by the name of 'Cricket with Mohinder Amarnath'. It featured technique presentation and discussion with guest speakers who were mostly Indian national team members at the time. It had a decent following among the youth of that time who were hooked to cricket especially after Reliance Cup was held in India in 1987, given that the program was available on the national channel Doordarshan thus taking cricket to the masses. The title song of this program 'Khel hi hain hamara jeevan...' was very catchy. Young Sachin Tendulkar, at 15 years old, was interviewed by Amarnath for the program. Sachin was playing wonderfully in the domestic leagues, and was showing enormous potential. After a year, he was inducted into the Indian team for the Pakistan tour.

== Personal life ==
Mohinder Amarnath is married to Inderjit Amarnath, and they have one daughter.

== In popular culture ==
The 2021 Hindi film 83, based on India's 1983 World Cup victory, features Saqib Saleem as Amarnath, and Amarnath himself as his father, Lala. Amarnath also played the role of a cricket coach to Saleem's character, Viraj Sharma, in the 2016 film Dishoom.

== Filmography ==
Year	Film	Role(s)	Notes	Ref(s)
1985	Kabhie Ajnabi The	Himself		
2016	Dishoom	Dhananjay Sadanand, Indian Cricket Team coach		
2021	83	Lala Amarnath	His own role was portrayed by Saqib Saleem	
