= 2026–27 Senior Women's Inter Zonal Multi-Day Trophy =

Cricket tournament

2026–27 Senior Women's Cricket Inter Zonal Multi-Day Trophy
- Dates: 13 March – 28 March 2027
- Administrator: Board of Control for Cricket in India
- Cricket format: First-class
- Tournament format: Knockout
- Host: India
- Participants: 6
- Matches: 5

2026–27 Senior Women's Inter Zonal Multi-Day Trophy will be the 7th season of the Senior Women's Inter Zonal Multi-Day Trophy, a women's first-class cricket competition played in India. The tournament will take place from 24 November to 4 December 2026 with six zonal teams taking part. The tournament formed part of the 2026–27 Indian domestic cricket season, announced by the Board of Control for Cricket in India (BCCI) in June 2026. West Zone were the defending champions.
