= Handled the ball =

Former method of dismissing a batsman in cricket

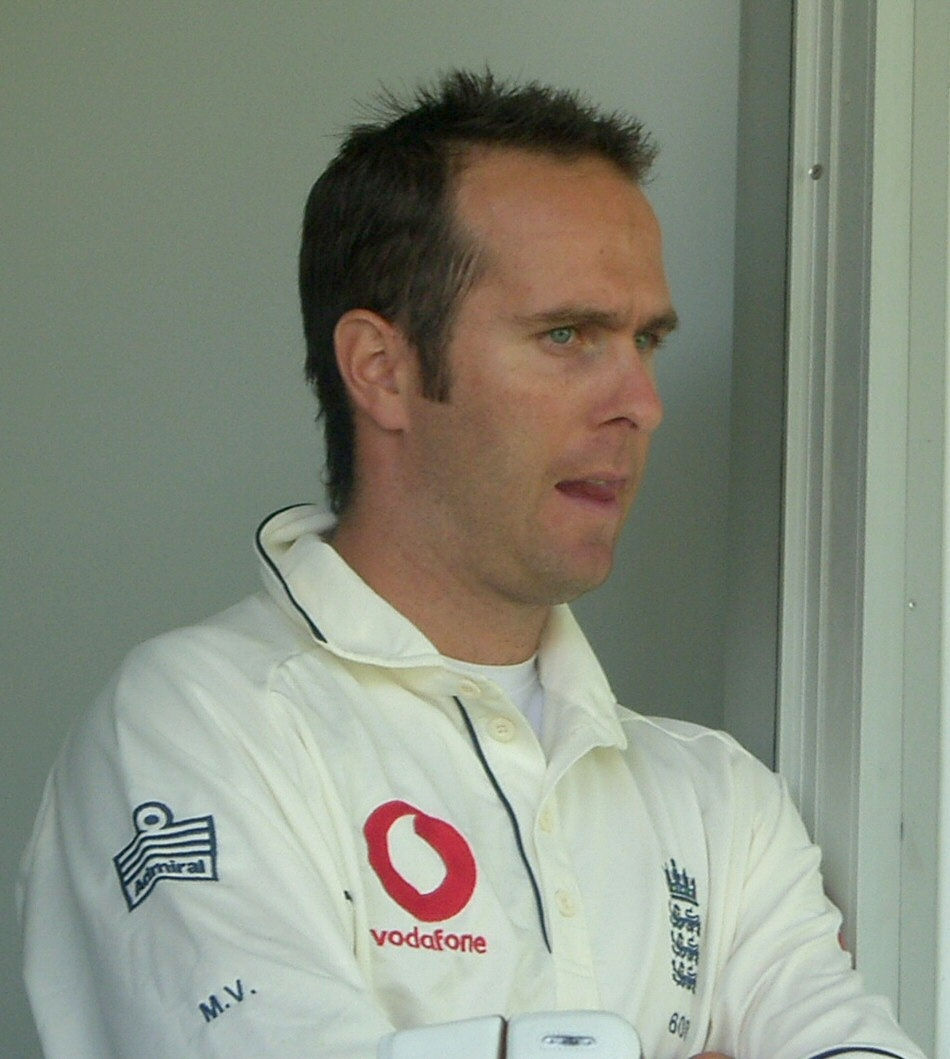
Michael Vaughan was the penultimate cricketer to be dismissed handled the ball in international cricket, in 2001.

Handled the ball was formerly one of the methods of dismissing a batter in the sport of cricket, but was integrated into the Law on obstructing the field when the Laws of Cricket were rewritten in 2017. It dictated that either batter can be given out if they intentionally touch the ball with a hand that is not holding their bat. An exception was given if the batter handled the ball to avoid injury. It was governed by Law 33 of the 2000 Edition of the Laws, and was a rare way for a batter to be dismissed: in the history of cricket, there have been 61 instances in first-class matches and 5 occasions in List A games. In most cases this occurred when a batter thought that the ball was going to hit their wicket, and knocked it away from the stumps with their hand.

In international cricket, only ten dismissals have been in this fashion; on seven occasions in Test cricket and three times in One Day Internationals. The South African Russell Endean became the first victim of this method in international cricket when he was dismissed in a 1957 Test match against England. The final occurrence was in an ODI in 2015, when Chamu Chibhabha of Zimbabwe was given out against Afghanistan national cricket team. After the rebranding of the law, Mushfiqur Rahim handled the ball in a test match against New Zealand. On appeal, he was given out 'Obstructing the field'.

== Definition ==
Handled the ball was Law 33 in the Laws of Cricket established by the Marylebone Cricket Club (MCC). A batter could be given out for handling the ball if, while playing a delivery, the batter intentionally touched the ball with one or both of their hands not holding the bat. A decision of not out would be reached if the batter handled the ball to avoid incurring an injury. A bowler did not receive credit for the wicket when a batter was dismissed in this fashion.

== History ==
As a method of dismissal, handling the ball was included in the Laws of Cricket from the original code, written in 1744. In that document, it stated that "If ye Striker touches or takes up ye Ball before she is lain quite still, unless asked by ye Bowler or Wicket-keeper, its out." Similar wording remained in the revision made to the laws thirty years later. The first batter to be dismissed for handling the ball in first-class cricket was James Grundy, who suffered the fate while playing for the MCC against Kent in 1857. Prior to 1899, a batter could be given out for handling the ball even if they were doing so to remove a ball which had got stuck in their equipment or clothing. At the time, if one of the fielders removed the ball from the batter's clothing, they could claim a catch. It was in such a situation that George Bennett, the first player to be given out handled the ball in English county cricket, was dismissed in 1872. The wicket of William Scotton in early 1887 was described by Gerald Brodribb as "most unusual". In a match between the smokers and the non-smokers involved in the 1886–87 Ashes series, Scotton faced the final delivery of the contest. Eager to claim the ball as a souvenir of the high-scoring match, he defended the delivery and picked the ball up. The fielders—who also wanted the souvenir—appealed, and Scotton was ruled out.

An addition was made to the law in 1950 to allow umpires to give a batter not out if the ball should strike the hand after "an involuntary action by the striker in the throwing up of a hand to protect his person". For a time, the act of handing the ball back to the fielding side was listed as not out under Law 33, and instead was considered to be part of a different method of dismissal: obstructing the field, covered in Law 37. The illegal nature of this offence was later returned to Law 33, but reverted to Law 37 in 2013. In 1948 the MCC issued a reminder to batsman, advising them not to handle the ball for any reason at any point during a cricket match, but it is relatively common for batters to pick the ball up and return it to the fielding side. Charles Wright was the first player to be dismissed for returning the ball to a fielder in first-class cricket; albeit wrongly. Brodribb relates that in an 1893 match, W. G. Grace influenced Wright to return the ball to him, and upon doing so, appealed. The umpire dismissed Wright, despite a clause added to the law nine years previous stating that a batter would not be ruled out if they were returning the ball at the request of the fielding side.

In 2013, the law received a major change. Prior to this, there had been ambiguity in certain situations whether handling the ball or obstructing the field was applicable. This ambiguity was removed by setting a clear demarcation point between the two as the point when the striker has "finished playing the ball": before this point, handling the ball applies; thereafter, obstructing the field applies. The result was that only the striker could be dismissed handled ball, and only during the short period when the striker was playing (or attempting to play) the ball, either as a first or subsequent stroke. The act of handing the ball back to the fielding side, mentioned above, was therefore no longer regarded as the striker playing the ball, resulting in this event then being dealt with under obstructing the field.

In March 2017 it was announced by the MCC that the law on handled the ball would be completely removed and subsumed into the law on obstructing the field. This means that the act of handling the ball will still result in the batter's dismissal, but will now always be recorded as obstructing the field. The new law came into effect on 1 October 2017.

In total, there were 63 occasions on which a batter has been given out handled the ball in first-class cricket and 5 instances in List A cricket. Brodribb suggests that it is likely that there should have been a significant number more dismissals than there have been for handling the ball: in addition to the cases where batter have returned the ball to the fielding side without permission, there are records of cases in which the umpires have been reticent to uphold an appeal. On one such instance, the umpire David Constant rejected an appeal against Younis Ahmed, saying that he thought the appeal was not serious.

== Occasions in international cricket ==
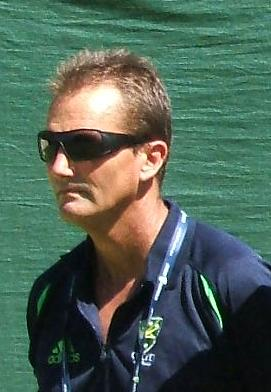
Andrew Hilditch is the only non-striking batter to have been given out for handling the ball in international cricket.

The first occasion of a batter being given out handled the ball in international cricket occurred during a Test match between South Africa and England in Cape Town in 1957. In the second innings of the match, the South African Russell Endean padded away a delivery from Jim Laker. The ball looped off his pads into the air, and was falling towards his stumps until Endean instinctively knocked it away with his free hand. He later suggested that he had "thought of heading it away, but that seemed too theatrical". The second instance came 22 years later during a bad-tempered series between Australia and Pakistan that also involved another rare dismissal method: Mankading. Andrew Hilditch was the victim in this match; he picked up the ball and returned it to the bowler after a wayward throw from a fielder. The bowler, Sarfraz Nawaz, appealed for the wicket and Hilditch was given out. Another Pakistan player, Asif Iqbal, distanced himself from the incident, commenting that he felt "there was no need for us to stoop so low as to appeal against Hilditch". Hilditch's dismissal marked the only time that a non-striking batter has been given out for handling the ball. The next case also occurred in another match between Australia and Pakistan. Mohsin Khan defended a delivery from Geoff Lawson, which then landed behind him. Mohsin pushed the ball away from the stumps with his hand, resulting in the wicket.

Desmond Haynes was the fourth man to be dismissed for handling the ball in Test cricket, just over a year after Mohsin. Facing India in late 1983, Haynes had been struck on the bat and pad by the ball, which then headed towards the stumps. The West Indian batter redirected the ball away from the stumps with his free hand. Upon being given out, Haynes—who was ignorant of the law regarding handling the ball—argued with the umpire about the dismissal. After asking the bowler, Kapil Dev, if he wanted to withdraw his appeal, the umpire sent Haynes back to the pavilion. The first instance in One Day Internationals was in 1986, when the Indian batter Mohinder Amarnath knocked away a turning delivery from Australia's Greg Matthews that was heading for the stumps. In 1993, Graham Gooch became the only player to be dismissed for handling the ball after scoring a century. Playing defensively to try and draw the Test match against Australia, Gooch blocked a short ball from Merv Hughes. The ball flicked off his bat and fell towards his stumps, prompting Gooch to instinctively punch the ball away: Australia won the match by 179 runs.

The dismissal of Daryll Cullinan in 1999 was the second instance in ODIs: facing the West Indian spinner Keith Arthurton, Cullinan fended the ball off into the ground. It bounced high in the air, and Cullinan removed his right hand from his bat to catch it as it fell again. Despite the fact that it was unlikely that the ball would land near the stumps, the West Indies captain, Brian Lara, appealed, and Cullinan was dismissed. The next occurrence was two years later, in a Test match between Australia and India. In the first innings of the match, Steve Waugh was struck on the pads by a delivery from Harbhajan Singh. The umpire turned down the appeal, but as he did so, the ball bounced and spun towards the stumps. Waugh was alerted by a shout from the non-striking batsman, and instinctively swept the ball away with his free hand. The most recent instance came during the same year as Waugh's dismissal, in another Test match involving India. England's Michael Vaughan missed an attempted sweep against Sarandeep Singh, and the ball trickled along the ground after striking his pads. Vaughan brushed the ball away with his hand, despite the fact that it was not travelling towards the stumps. Initially, he claimed that he was attempting to give the ball back to the fielder at short leg, but he later admitted that he "should have just held up [his] hands and said 'I got it all wrong, I'm an idiot'".

=== Batters dismissed in international cricket ===
No.	Batsman	Runs	Team	Opposition	Venue	Match date	Format	Ref
1	Russell Endean	3	South Africa	England	Newlands, Cape Town	1 January 1957	Test	
2	Andrew Hilditch	29	Australia	Pakistan	WACA, Perth	24 March 1979	Test	
3	Mohsin Khan	58	Pakistan	Australia	National Stadium, Karachi	22 September 1982	Test	
4	Desmond Haynes	55	West Indies	India	Wankhede Stadium, Bombay	24 November 1983	Test	
5	Mohinder Amarnath	15	India	Australia	Melbourne Cricket Ground, Melbourne	9 February 1986	ODI	
6	Graham Gooch	133	England	Australia	Old Trafford, Manchester	3 June 1993	Test	
7	Daryll Cullinan	46	South Africa	West Indies	Kingsmead, Durban	27 January 1999	ODI	
8	Steve Waugh	47	Australia	India	MA Chidambaram Stadium, Chennai	18 March 2001	Test	
9	Michael Vaughan	64	England	India	M Chinnaswamy Stadium, Bangalore	19 December 2001	Test	
10	Chamu Chibhabha	18	Zimbabwe	Afghanistan	Queens Sports Club, Bulawayo	20 October 2015	ODI	

== See also ==
- List of unusual dismissals in international cricket

== Bibliography ==
- Brodribb, Gerald (1995). Next Man In: A Survey of Cricket Laws and Customs. London: Souvenir Press. ISBN 0-285-63294-9.
