= 2025–26 Senior Women's Inter Zonal Multi-Day Trophy =

Cricket tournament

2025–26 Senior Women's Cricket Inter Zonal Multi-Day Trophy
- Dates: 20 March – 3 April 2026
- Administrator: Board of Control for Cricket in India
- Cricket format: First-class
- Tournament format: Knockout
- Host: India
- Participants: 6
- Matches: 5

2025–26 Senior Women's Inter Zonal Multi-Day Trophy will be the sixth season of the Inter Zonal Multi-Day Trophy, a women's first-class cricket competition played in India. It will take place from 20 March to 3 April 2026. The tournament formed part of the 2025–26 Indian domestic cricket season, announced by the Board of Control for Cricket in India (BCCI) in June 2025. East Zone were the defending champions.

The tournament featured six zonal teams – Central Zone, East Zone, North Zone, North East Zone, South Zone and West Zone.
