= Retired (cricket) =

Cricket term

In cricket, a batter may retire from an innings at any time when the ball is dead; they must then be replaced by a teammate who has not been dismissed. The most common reason for retirement is if the batter becomes injured or unwell, in which case they can resume their innings.

Retirement is covered by Law 25 of the Laws of Cricket, which distinguishes between two types of retirement. If the batter is ill or injured they are considered retired – not out and are permitted to return to batting if they recover. In all other cases the batter is considered retired – out and may not return to the innings, unless the opposing captain offers an exemption. These two types of retirement are considered differently in cricket statistics.

== Retired – not out ==
If a batting player becomes injured or falls ill (or some other exceptional circumstance forces them to leave the field), and they receive permission from the umpire, they may retire not out. If the retired batter recovers before the end of the innings, they may resume batting, upon the dismissal or retirement of another batter. If they cannot return to batting by the end of the innings, e.g. if they have been taken to hospital for medical treatment, the batting side must close its innings once it is all out i.e. has only one batter who is not out and not retired. It is therefore possible for the innings to end despite the batting side only losing nine wickets (or fewer, if there are multiple retirements).

This situation is officially recorded on the scorecard as "retired – not out", though the unofficial term "retired – hurt" is often used on broadcasts instead. The batter is considered not out for statistical purposes e.g. when calculating a batting average.

== Retired – out ==
If a batter retires for any other reason, or without the umpire's permission, they are considered to have forfeited their wicket and are therefore out. Unless the opposing captain offers an exemption, the retired batters may not return. This situation is recorded on the scorecard as 'retired – out' and is considered a dismissal for statistical purposes, though is not credited to a bowler.

== Examples ==
As of 2019, only two batters have retired out in a test match, and both instances occurred in the same innings: Sri Lankan batters Marvan Atapattu and Mahela Jayawardene both retired out in a match against Bangladesh in 2001. The decision was controversial, since they retired out to give the rest of the team batting practice, and this was considered unsporting.

The only example in Test cricket of an opposing captain granting an exemption was for Gordon Greenidge, during the fifth Test of the 1982–83 India–West Indies series. Greenidge was not out on a score of 154 overnight (his highest score in Tests to that point), when he received news that his two-year-old daughter was critically ill. He retired and flew from Antigua to Barbados to visit the hospital where his daughter was being treated; she died two days later. Greenidge took no further part in the match. As a mark of respect, opposing Indian captain Kapil Dev granted an exemption for Greenidge, and he was recorded as "retired not out".

In Twenty20 (T20) cricket, teams sometimes retire a batter for purely tactical reasons, such as to switch left- and right-handed batters, though this practice has been controversial and lambasted as unsporting. The first example at professional level was in a match between Bhutan and Maldives at the 2019 South Asian Games, when Sonam Tobgay of Bhutan retired out at the end of the 19th over. In the 2022 Indian Premier League, R Ashwin retired out while playing for Rajasthan Royals against Lucknow Super Giants. In June 2022, during the 2022 T20 Blast match between the Birmingham Bears and the Notts Outlaws, Carlos Brathwaite (Birmingham Bears) and Samit Patel (Nottinghamshire Outlaws) both retired out for tactical reasons. During the group stage match between Namibia and England held at Sir Vivian Richards Stadium in the 2024 ICC Men's T20 World Cup, Namibia's Niko Davin became the first batter to be dismissed retired out in a T20 World Cup match. Davin who came in as the opening batsman for Namibia in the run chase, then announced himself that he was leaving the field during the 6th over of the Namibian innings while he was still batting with an unbeaten score of 18 runs off 16 balls. Namibia were left to chase a revised target of 126 runs in 10 overs in a rain-curtailed match, and as a result, he made himself retire out considering the circumstances Namibia were reeling at and to make a case for another batter to capitalize on the required run rate in order to score runs in a quick manner. Another example of being retired out is in the third match of Pakistan tour of West Indies in 2025, when Roston Chase was retired out, while West Indies required 41 from 18 balls; he had scored 15 off 12 balls. During the 2025 T20 Blast semi-final between Somerset and Lancashire Lightning, Lancashire batter George Balderson retired out in the 19th over of the Lancashire innings and was replaced at the crease by Tom Hartley in an attempt to help Lancashire reach their victory target of 183 because Lancashire Captain Keaton Jennings believed Hartley could score enough runs for Lancashire to win the match in the balls remaining. However this tactic would backfire and Hartley would be out first ball with Somerset winning the game by 23 runs after eventually bowling Lancashire out for 159.

== As alternative to a declaration ==
Limited overs matches have game conditions that prevent teams from declaring an innings closed. This was in response to an incident in 1979 involving Brian Rose who as captain of Somerset, declared their limited overs innings closed having scored a single run in their match against Worcester to manipulate a tie-breaker situation in favour of his side. There has been no addition to the laws or general match conditions to prevent teams from retiring their batters one after the other until the innings is closed. An example of this was a match of the 2025 Women's T20 World Cup Asia Qualifier when 10 United Arab Emirates players retired out. The tournament situation made winning vitally important and rain started to fall in the 16th over. Having already scored 192–0 they asked to declare and were refused. This prompted the successive retirements to end their innings 4 overs early to save time. They won the game by 163 runs after bowling out Qatar for 29 in 11.1 overs.

== See also ==
- List of unusual dismissals in international cricket
