= Senior Women's Inter Zonal Multi-Day Trophy =

Women's first class cricket tournament in India

Senior Women's Cricket Inter Zonal Three Day Game
- Countries: India
- Administrator: BCCI
- Format: First-class
- First edition: 2014–15
- Latest edition: 2025–26
- Tournament format: Round-robin tournament
- Number of teams: 5
- Current champion: North Zone (2nd title)
- Most successful: Central Zone (3 titles)
- 2026–27 Senior Women's Inter Zonal Multi-Day Trophy

The Senior Women's Inter Zonal Multi Day Trophy is an Indian women's cricket first-class domestic competition organised by the Board of Control for Cricket in India. The competition began in 2014–15, as a two-day competition, with the three subsequent competitions in 2015–16, 2016–17 and 2017–18 operating with a three-day format. After the 2017–18 season, the competition was discontinued until it was revived again in 2023-24.

In its first four editions, the competition featured five teams, each representing a region (or "zone") of India: Central Zone, East Zone, North Zone, South Zone and West Zone. After the North East Zone was created in 2022–23, they participated in the succeeding edition of the tournament in 2023–24. Central Zone are the most successful team in the history of the competition, winning the first three editions. The holders are East Zone who won the most recent competition in 2023–24.

== History ==
The competition began in February 2015, as the Senior Women's Cricket Inter Zonal Two Day Game, with the five zonal teams playing each other once in two-day matches, all held in Kolkata. No matches were won outright, but points were awarded for leading on the first innings of the match. Central Zone were the inaugural winners of the competition, winning three of their four matches on first innings.

The following season, 2015–16, the format was changed to three-day matches, and the tournament was held in Guntur district in Andhra Pradesh. Central Zone were again the champions, winning one match outright and another two on first innings.

The 2016-17 edition of the competition was conducted wholly in Chhattisgarh. Central Zone won their third successive title after being placed first in the round-robin with two wins from four matches.

In the 2017–18 season the competition was held in Kerala and all matches were played in Thiruvananthapuram. After the round-robin stage, North Zone topped the table and won the title with two wins and two draws in their four matches.

== Teams ==
Team	Wins	Runners-up
Central Zone	3	0
East Zone	1	2
North Zone	2	0
South Zone	0	2
West Zone	0	1

== Competition format ==
Till the 2017–18 season, matches in the tournament were played using a three-day format (apart from the first season, in which matches were two-days). The five teams plays each other once in a round-robin format, therefore playing four matches in a season. All five teams competed in one league, with the team finishing top at the end of the season being crowned the champions.

Teams were awarded 6 points for a win, 3 points for a tie and 0 points for a loss. If a match was drawn, the team that with the highest score at the end of the first innings received 3 points, whilst the team with the lower score receives one point. Both teams received 1 point if both first innings were not completed, the two scores were tied, or if the match was abandoned. If two teams were joint on points in the table, the tiebreakers were most wins and then net run rate.

However, the tournament format was changed into a single-elimination tournament featuring quarter-finals, semi-finals and final for the 2023–24 season.

== Tournament results ==
Season	Winners	Runners-up	Match format	Ref
2014–15	Central Zone	East Zone	2 days	
2015–16	Central Zone	East Zone	3 days	
2016–17	Central Zone	West Zone	3 days	
2017–18	North Zone	South Zone	3 days	
2023–24	East Zone	South Zone	3 days	South Zone
2025–26	North Zone	West Zone		
2026–27
