= Obstructing the field =

Method of dismissing a batsman in cricket

Obstructing the field is one of the ten methods of dismissing a batsman in the sport of cricket. Either batsman can be given out if he wilfully attempts to obstruct or distract the fielding side by word or action. It is Law 37 of the Laws of cricket, and is a rare way for a batsman to be dismissed; in the history of cricket, there has been only two instances in Test matches, nine in One Day International (ODI) matches, and six in Twenty20 International matches. There have also been seven instances in Test cricket, and two in ODIs, where a batsman has been dismissed handled the ball, a mode of dismissal now folded into obstructing the field.

One modern pattern of obstruction in limited overs cricket occurs when a batsman thinks that he is going to be run out and blocks the ball with his bat, or changes his course while running between wickets to block the ball. Under the standard Laws the obstruction has to be deliberate.

In addition to one batter being out, whichever batter committed the obstruction has by definition performed a wilful act, which may well be in violation of both the Laws and the Spirit of Cricket, so risks unfavourable judgement by the umpires under Law 41 (Unfair Play) and Law 42 (Player Behaviour) and thus other sanctions during and after the game. In elite cricket, the Match Referee is likely to be involved.

== Definition ==
Obstructing the field is Law 37 in the Laws of cricket established by the Marylebone Cricket Club (MCC). A batsman can be given out for obstructing the field if he wilfully attempts to obstruct or distract the fielding side by word or action.

Law 37 describes three specific circumstances where this applies, but the Law is not limited to these circumstances:

- If, in the act of playing the ball, the batsmen wilfully strikes the ball with a hand not holding the bat, unless this is to avoid injury. (Note: This situation was previously covered in a separate Law:Handled the ball.)
- If either batsman should wilfully obstruct or distract a fielder preventing a catch being made.
- If, at any time while the ball is in play and without the consent of a fielder, he uses his bat or any part of his person, to return the ball to any fielder.

In the second specific case, the striker is out, as they were at risk of being out caught were it not for the obstruction. In any other case it is the batsman who obstructs who is out . (Note: If it is a No ball the batsman cannot be caught out, the obstruction of a catch is still out if wilful, but it is the batsman who obstructs who is out) If the catch is taken, the striker is out caught under Law 33, which takes precedence over obstruction for the purpose of accounting the method of dismissal.

If a batsman deliberately alters his course whilst running, or interposes his bat, to block the path of a ball thrown at the stumps by a fielder, the umpire must decide whether the action is wilful. The umpire does not have to judge whether the fielding would have been likely to effect a Run out.

Some recent limited overs playing conditions have changed the test of intent, so that the batter is out on appeal if, in running between the wickets, they "significantly change ... direction without probable cause".

The bowler does not get credit for any obstruction dismissal. Any runs completed before the offence is committed are scored (unless the obstruction prevents a catch being made (Note: In this case any penalty runs will stand.)).

== Returning the ball to a fielder ==
When, after being played with the bat or hitting the batter, the ball comes to rest nearer the batter that any fielder, it may seem natural, polite and quickest for the batter to pick up the ball and give it to a fielder. There is some risk that the fielding team may construe the act to be a wilful obstruction.

Traditionally, a batter would ask the fielding team's consent to touch the ball before doing so, but even if not, if there were any goodwill between the teams, the fielding team would be unlikely to appeal, and unlikely to have their appeal confirmed by their captain, but the umpire would be obliged to give the batsman out if an appeal was made. Batters were advised to ask to avoid the possibility of 'unpleasantness.'

In the modern professional game the question is sensitive, as the fielding side may be trying to keep the ball dry and clean so that they may obtain reverse swing, and may well decline the batter's offer to touch the ball.

The first such dismissal in elite cricket was in an U19 World Cup game against Zimbabwe on 3rd Feb 2024 when England's Hamza Shaikh picked up a stationary ball that he had just played at, and tossed it to the wicketkeeper, who appealed before even catching the ball. Shaikh was given out after lengthy consultation between the onfield and third umpires. Commentators have been uncomfortable with the decision, but the umpires only have to decide whether the ball is in play (if the fielding side acted as if they regarded it as so, that is sufficient) and whether the batter's action was wilful (picking the ball up without consent is sufficient).

== Earliest recorded instance ==
The first known instance of a player being dismissed in a manner equivalent to the modern term 'Obstructing the field' occurred in a minor match at Sheffield on 27 August 1792, between Sheffield Cricket Club and Bents Green. The Bents Green player John Shaw, who scored 7 in the first innings, had his dismissal recorded as "run out of the ground to hinder a catch". The information was recorded by G. B. Buckley who found it in the Sheffield Advertiser dated 31 August 1792. Sheffield won by 10 wickets in a match that was notable for two other reasons, these being that it was the first match played in Yorkshire for which full scores are recorded and it was the earliest known instance of a three innings match.

== Dismissals in international cricket ==
=== Test cricket ===
Two batsmen have been dismissed obstructing the field in a Test match. The first time was during the fifth Test match of South African cricket team's tour of England in 1951, when England's Len Hutton top edged the ball and, thinking the ball would hit the stumps, attempted to hit the ball away which prevented the wicket-keeper from catching the ball. In the second instance, from the second Test of New Zealand's tour of Bangladesh in December 2023, Mushfiqur Rahim defended a ball from Kyle Jamieson and then pushed the ball away with his right hand as it bounced away from the stumps. He also became the first batsman in test to get out by obstructing the field since the rule for handling the ball was included in this law in October 2017.

Test dismissals obstructed the field
No	Batsman	Country	Opposition	Venue	Match	Date
1	Leonard Hutton	England	South Africa	The Oval, London, England	5th Test	16 August 1951
2	Mushfiqur Rahim	Bangladesh	New Zealand	Shere Bangla National Stadium, Mirpur, Bangladesh	2nd Test	6 December 2023

=== One Day Internationals ===
In One Day Internationals, Rameez Raja (for Pakistan against England at Karachi in 1987) was given out for hitting the ball away with his bat to avoid being run out going for his century off the last ball of the innings, and Mohinder Amarnath (for India against Sri Lanka at Ahmedabad in 1989) was given out for kicking the ball away to avoid being run out. Another batsman to be given out this way is Inzamam-ul-Haq of Pakistan in the first ODI of India vs Pakistan Hutch Cup on 6 February 2006. After Inzamam drove the ball to mid off, Indian Suresh Raina threw it back to the striker's end, Inzamam stopping it with his bat while standing out of his crease. Umpire Simon Taufel gave him out adjudging it a wilful obstruction.

Mohammad Hafeez of Pakistan was dismissed obstructing the field on 21 March 2013 in the 4th ODI of the bilateral series match against South Africa. He became the first man to be given out obstructing the field after the new playing conditions were introduced. His teammate, Anwar Ali, was dismissed obstructing the field on 27 November 2013 in the second ODI against South Africa.

Ben Stokes of England was dismissed obstructing the field on 5 September 2015 in the second ODI against Australia for stopping the ball with his hand when the bowler, Mitchell Starc, had thrown the ball in an attempt to run him out. Stokes was outside the crease when he stuck out his hand not holding the bat, blocking the ball which was on a path likely to hit the stumps.

The complete list of batsmen given out obstructing the field in One Day Internationals is:

One Day International dismissals obstructed the field
No	Batsman	Country	Opposition	Venue	Match	Date
1	Rameez Raja	Pakistan	England	Karachi, Pakistan	2nd ODI	20 November 1987
2	Mohinder Amarnath	India	Sri Lanka	Ahmedabad, India	6th ODI	22 October 1989
3	Inzamam-ul-Haq	Pakistan	India	Peshawar, Pakistan	1st ODI	6 February 2006
4	Mohammad Hafeez	Pakistan	South Africa	Durban, South Africa	4th ODI	21 March 2013
5	Anwar Ali	Pakistan	South Africa	Port Elizabeth, South Africa	2nd ODI	27 November 2013
6	Ben Stokes	England	Australia	London, England	2nd ODI	5 September 2015
7	Xavier Marshall	United States	United Arab Emirates	Sharjah, United Arab Emirates	1st ODI	8 December 2019
8	Danushka Gunathilaka	Sri Lanka	West Indies	North Sound, Antigua and Barbuda	1st ODI	10 March 2021

=== Women's One Day Internationals ===
Women's One Day International dismissals obstructed the field
No	Batter	Country	Opposition	Venue	Match	Date
1	Thirush Kamini	India	West Indies	Vijayawada, India	2nd ODI	13 November 2016

=== T20 Internationals ===
On 23 June 2017, in a Twenty20 match against South Africa, Jason Roy of England was given out obstructing the field, for changing the side of the pitch he was running on when returning from backing up. This caused the returned ball to hit him when he was out of his crease, when it could conceivably have hit the stumps. The South African fielders immediately appealed for a dismissal. Responding to this, the on-field umpires called the ball dead and referred the decision to the third umpire, who gave Roy out.

The complete list of batsmen given out obstructing the field in Twenty20 Internationals is:

T20 International dismissals obstructed the field
No	Batsman	Country	Opposition	Venue	Match	Date
1	Jason Roy	England	South Africa	Taunton, England	2nd T20I	23 June 2017
2	Hassan Rasheed	Maldives	Qatar	Muscat, Oman	7th T20I	23 January 2019
3	Razmal Shigiwal	Austria	Czech Republic	Prague, Czech Republic	6th T20I	10 July 2022
4	Abass Gbla	Sierra Leone	Ghana	Benoni, South Africa	12th T20I	17 December 2023

=== Women's T20 Internationals ===
Indian middle-order batter Anuja Patil was given out obstructing the field in the first innings of the final of the 2018 Women's Twenty20 Asia Cup against Bangladesh. She changed the course of her run en route to the non-striker's end while attempting a single.

Zimbabwean captain Mary-Ann Musonda was given out obstructing the field in the first innings of a game against Uganda during the 2022 Namibia Women's Tri-Nation Series in April 2022. She defended a ball from Janet Mbabazi which then rebounded towards her stumps, then gently hit the ball back to Mbabazi while remaining in her crease at all times.

Women's T20 International dismissals obstructed the field
No	Batswoman	Country	Opposition	Venue	Match	Date
1	Anuja Patil	India	Bangladesh	Kuala Lumpur, Malaysia	Final	10 June 2018
2	Mary-Ann Musonda	Zimbabwe	Uganda	Windhoek, Namibia	4th T20I	22 April 2022

== Other recent instances ==
Mark Ramprakash was dismissed obstructing the field on 30 July 2011, in a County Championship Division 2 match between Surrey and Gloucestershire. Ramprakash was deemed to have deliberately tried to distract a fielder who was in the act of trying to run him out. He made no contact with the ball and it did not hit the stumps.

Yusuf Pathan of India was dismissed obstructing the field on 15 May 2013 while playing for the Kolkata Knight Riders against the Pune Warriors India in Match 65 of the 2013 Indian Premier League for deliberately kicking the ball while rotating the strike. He became the first player to be dismissed in T20 cricket in this fashion.

Sheldon Jackson was given out obstructing the field on 3 March 2017 during the 2016–17 Vijay Hazare Trophy match against Chhattisgarh. Jackson became only the second Indian batsman to be given out in a List A match in this manner.

Alex Ross of the Brisbane Heat was given out obstructing the field in a Big Bash League match against the Hobart Hurricanes in January 2018 for interfering with an attempted run out. It was the first time in Big Bash League history that a player was given out in this manner.

Ryan Burl was given out in a match in the 2017–18 Logan Cup for obstructing the field, after he protected his wicket by pushing the ball away from the stumps with his hand, having missed the ball with his bat.

Amit Mishra was also dismissed for obstructing the field in the 2019 Indian Premier League Eliminator match against Sunrisers Hyderabad. He changed his line while Khaleel Ahmed was throwing the ball to prevent a run out, and was thus given out.

Angkrish Raghuvanshi was dismissed for obstructing the field in the 2026 Indian Premier League in the match against Lucknow Super Giants. He tried to take a run, but was sent back. While returning to the crease, he changed his direction, and a throw from a fielder struck him. The umpires reviewed the footage, deciding what he did was deliberate to block the throw, leading to his wicket.

== See also ==
- List of unusual dismissals in international cricket

== Bibliography ==
- Buckley, G. B. (1937). Fresh Light on pre-Victorian Cricket. Cotterell.
- Wisden Cricketers' Almanack – various issues
