= Toby Roland-Jones =

English cricketer (born 1988)

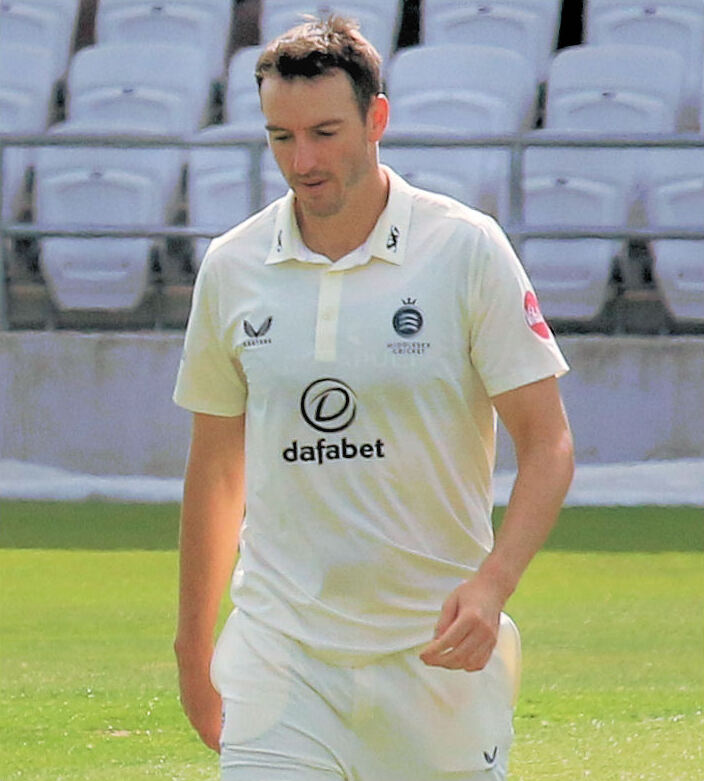
- Roland-Jones in 2024

Personal information
- Full name: Tobias Skelton Roland-Jones
- Born: 29 January 1988 (age 38); Ashford, Surrey, England
- Height: 6 ft 3 in (191 cm)
- Batting: Right-handed
- Bowling: Right-arm medium-fast
- Role: Bowler

International information
- National side: England
- Test debut (cap 678): 27 July 2017 v South Africa
- Last Test: 7 September 2017 v West Indies
- Only ODI (cap 247): 29 May 2017 v South Africa
- ODI shirt no.: 22

Domestic team information
- Years: Team
- 2010–present: Middlesex (squad no. 21)

Career statistics
Competition	Test	ODI	FC	LA
Matches	4	1	181	96
Runs scored	82	37	4,454	822
Batting average	20.50	–	21.10	20.55
100s/50s	0/0	0/0	1/17	0/1
Top score	25	37*	103*	65
Balls bowled	536	42	31,996	4,480
Wickets	17	1	664	140
Bowling average	19.64	34.00	24.65	26.82
5 wickets in innings	1	0	36	0
10 wickets in match	0	0	7	0
Best bowling	5/57	1/34	7/52	4/10
Catches/stumpings	0/–	0/–	54/–	19/–
- Source: ESPNcricinfo, 27 September 2026

Tobias Skelton Roland-Jones (born 29 January 1988) is an English cricketer.

A medium-fast, right-arm bowler and a lower order right-handed batsman, Roland-Jones represents Middlesex in county cricket, and has represented England at Test and One Day International (ODI) level.

== Early life and career ==
Roland-Jones was born in Ashford, now in Surrey but historically in Middlesex.

Having been spotted playing for Leeds/Bradford MCCU, Roland-Jones signed his first professional contract with Middlesex County Cricket Club following a successful trial in 2009.

== County career ==
Roland-Jones made his List A debut for Middlesex in a victory over Northamptonshire at Wantage Road on 25 April 2010. He made his first-class debut against Oxford MCCU on 25 May 2010. He took 128 first-class wickets in his first three years with the club, and signed a five-year contract in October 2012.

On 23 September 2016, Roland-Jones took a hat-trick against Yorkshire to secure the County Championship for Middlesex for the first time in 23 years. He was named one of the Wisden 2017's Cricketers of the year.

In September 2017, Roland-Jones suffered a lower-back stress fracture whilst playing for Middlesex and was consequently unavailable for selection for the England winter tours to Australia and New Zealand. On his return to county cricket in April 2018, a recurrence of the injury was predicted to rule him out of the 2018 season.

On 26 July 2019, in the 2019 T20 Blast match against Glamorgan, Roland-Jones took a hat-trick, finishing with career-best figures of 5 for 21.

In February 2023, Roland-Jones was appointed Middlesex club captain ahead of the 2023 season. He stepped down from the role by mutual agreement in July 2025.

== International career ==
In July 2016 he was named in England's squad for their Test series against Pakistan. However, he was dropped from the squad after Ben Stokes and James Anderson were recalled to the England squad for the second Test against Pakistan at Old Trafford. He made his ODI debut for England against South Africa on 29 May 2017.

He made his Test debut for England against South Africa on 27 July 2017 and took five wickets in his first Test match, ripping through the South African top four and completing his maiden five-for by removing Temba Bavuma. He was the first Englishman to take a five-for on debut since Adil Rashid in 2015. Roland-Jones also proved his batting capabilities by adding 25 in the first innings (including four fours and one six) and 23 not out (two sixes) in the second.

== See also ==
- List of England cricketers who have taken five-wicket hauls on Test debut
