= Russell Endean =

South African cricketer (1924–2003)

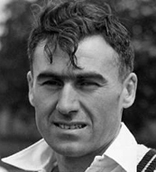

Personal information
- Born: 31 May 1924; Johannesburg, Transvaal
- Died: 28 June 2003 (aged 79); Kingston upon Thames, England
- Batting: Right-handed
- Role: Wicket-Keeper Batsman

International information
- National side: South Africa
- Test debut: 16 August 1951 v England
- Last Test: 28 February 1958 v Australia

Career statistics
Competition	Test	First-class
Matches	28	134
Runs scored	1,630	7,757
Batting average	33.95	37.83
100s/50s	3/8	15/34
Top score	162*	247
Balls bowled	–	102
Wickets	–	2
Bowling average	–	36.50
5 wickets in innings	–	0
10 wickets in match	–	0
Best bowling	–	1/1
Catches/stumpings	41/0	158/13
- Source: Cricinfo, 15 November 2022

William Russell Endean (31 May 1924 – 28 June 2003) was a South African cricketer who played in 28 Test matches from 1951 to 1958.

Endean had a part in two highly unusual Test match dismissals: he was the wicket-keeper whom Len Hutton obstructed leading to Hutton's being given out obstructing the field; and Endean himself was given out handled the ball, the first time in Test Cricket history a batsman was dismissed by this method.

He also holds the record for the most runs made before lunch on the first day of a first class match, scoring 197* for Transvaal against Orange Free State at Ellis Park in Johannesburg in the 1954/55 season.

== Personal life ==
Endean went straight from school into the South African Army, where he served in the Middle East and Italy during the Second World War. Following the end of the war, he became an accountant in Johannesburg, and also played hockey for the South African National team. He met his future wife, Muriel, on a cricket tour of England, and had two sons and a daughter with her.

== Retirement ==
Endean retired from state cricket at the end of the 1960–1961 season. He then moved to London, and worked as an accountant for BP. He continued to play for MCC in schools games, and also played club cricket for Malden Wanderers. He and his wife lived in Surrey.
