= Sarfraz Nawaz =

Pakistani cricketer

Personal information
- Full name: Sarfraz Nawaz Malik
- Born: 1 December 1948 (age 77); Lahore, Punjab, Pakistan
- Height: 6 ft 6 in (198 cm)
- Batting: Right-handed
- Bowling: Right-arm fast-medium
- Role: Bowler

International information
- National side: Pakistan (1969–1984)
- Test debut (cap 59): 6 March 1969 v England
- Last Test: 19 March 1984 v England
- ODI debut (cap 9): 11 February 1973 v New Zealand
- Last ODI: 12 November 1984 v New Zealand

Domestic team information
- Years: Team
- 1980–1984: Lahore
- 1969–1982: Northamptonshire
- 1976–1977: United Bank Limited
- 1975–1976: Pakistan Railways
- 1975: Punjab A
- 1968–1972: Punjab University
- 1967–1968: Lahore

Career statistics
Competition	Test	ODI	FC	LA
Matches	55	45	299	228
Runs scored	1,045	221	5,709	1,721
Batting average	17.71	9.60	19.35	15.36
100s/50s	0/4	0/0	0/17	0/3
Top score	90	34*	90	92
Balls bowled	13,951	2,412	55,692	11,537
Wickets	177	63	1,005	319
Bowling average	32.75	23.22	24.62	20.88
5 wickets in innings	4	0	46	3
10 wickets in match	1	0	4	0
Best bowling	9/86	4/27	9/86	5/15
Catches/stumpings	26/–	8/–	163/–	43/–
- Source: CricketArchive, 10 May 2009

Sarfraz Nawaz Malik (Punjabi, Urdu: سرفراز نواز ملک) (born 1 December 1948) is a former Pakistani Test cricketer and politician, who was instrumental in Pakistan's first Test series victories over India and England. Between 1969 and 1984, he played 55 Tests and 45 One Day Internationals and took 177 Test wickets at an average of 32.75. He is known as one of the earliest exponents of reverse swing.

== Early and personal life ==
=== Family background ===
Sarfraz's Punjabi family business was in the construction sector, his father Malik Muhammad Nawaz being a contractor, a field he himself joined in 1965, before going into professional cricket, his first construction project being a cricket stadium for Government College University Lahore (GCUL) but it didn't materialize due to the Indo-Pakistani war of 1965.

=== Education ===
He did his matriculation from a public school in Mozang in 1962 and after playing for a cricket club in Mozang he would later captain the Punjab University cricket team.

=== Cinema ===
He married Pakistani film actress Rani in 1985, and he himself had film offers during the 70s, for instance in 1974 while in England or later on from influential Pakistani film director Yunus Malik of Maula Jatt fame, but always refused them considering that acting is not his forte.

== Cricket career ==
=== Early career ===
In his first Test – against England at Karachi in 1969 – the twenty-year-old Sarfraz took no wickets, did not bat and was dropped for three years. In 1972–73 by taking 4/53 and 4/56 against Australia at the SCG, accounting for Ian and Greg Chappell, Keith Stackpole and Ian Redpath, but this did not stop the hosts winning by 56 runs. At Headingley in 1974 Sarfraz hit 53 off 74 balls to convert 209/8 into 285 all out, driving the ball fiercely off Geoff Arnold, Chris Old, Mike Hendrick, Tony Greig and Derek Underwood in a low scoring match. Against Clive Lloyd's West Indians in 1974–75 he took 6/89 at the Gaddafi Stadium in Lahore to dismiss them for 214, but the Test and the series were both drawn. Sarfraz was made vice-captain to Wasim Bari, but disappeared before the Second Test against England in 1977–78. He was found in London where he had gone to see Christmas and returned to Pakistan in time for the Third Test. As World Series Cricket was operating at time it was speculated that he was negotiating with Kerry Packer. At Headingley in 1978 he took 5/39 to reduce England to 119/7, dismissing Mike Brearley, Graham Gooch, David Gower, Ian Botham and Bob Taylor, but rain ruined play and the match was drawn. More decisively in 1978–79 Sarfraz's haul of 4/89 and 5/70 against India at Karachi gave Pakistan victory in the third and final Test by eight wickets. He took 17 wickets (25.00) in the series, the most by any player and Pakistan won their first Test series against their rivals despite having played them since 1952.

=== Australia 1978–79 ===
Sarfraz's greatest bowling performance took place in the First Test at Melbourne on 15 March 1979 when Australia were 305/3 with Allan Border (105) and Kim Hughes (84) at the crease needing only 77 runs to win. Sarfraz took 7/1 in 33 balls (3 of these runs came in no-balls which did not count against his analysis in those days) and dismissed Australia for 310 to give Pakistan a surprise 71 run victory. At the time his 9/86 in an innings was the best Test match analysis in Australia, the best by a Pakistani bowler and the fifth best in Test cricket. Sarfraz had also made 35 coming in at 99/6 in the first innings and took 11/125 in the match. He was also involved in the controversial dismissal of Andrew Hilditch for handling the ball in the Second Test at the WACA in Perth. The batsman was at the non-striker's end when the ball was returned to the crease by the wayward throw of a fielder. Hilditch picked up the ball and politely gave it to Sarfraz, Sarfraz appealed and Hilditch was given out. It was second time in a hundred years of Test cricket that a batsman had been given out in this fashion and although strictly correct it was considered to be against the spirit of the game. Earlier in the match the Australian tailender Rodney Hogg had been run out while 'gardening' and Alan Hurst controversially ran out Sikander Bakht when backing up, two pieces of gamesmanship which caused bad feeling between the teams. Australia made 236/3 to win the Test and square the series, the other two batsmen being run out and no bowler taking a wicket.

=== Later career ===
Sarfraz played for Northamptonshire in two separate spells and in the 1980 Benson and Hedges Cup Final he took 3/23 off 11 overs to restrict Essex to 203/8 in Northant's six run win. In 1983–84 he took 4/42 and 2/27 in the First Test against England at Karachi and hit the winning runs when Pakistan made 66/7 to win. After several 'retirements' the Third Test at the Gaddafi Stadium in Lahore proved to be his last and in the first innings his 4/49 helped dismiss England for 241. When Pakistan were reduced to 181/8 Sarfraz made 90, his highest Test and first-class score, adding 161 for the ninth wicket with his captain Zaheer Abbas (82 not out) to give his team a 102 run lead. David Gower made 173 not out and Safraz was hit for 1/112 in the second innings, but came in at 199/5 and saw out the match with 10 not out. This ensured that Pakistan kept their 1–0 lead to win their first Test series against England.

=== Style ===
Being 6’6'’ tall, Sarfraz was described "as strong as a cart-horse" and his powerful upper body and good action allowed him to bowl at a fast-medium pace. He could seam the ball in either direction and despite the convention he repeatedly bounced other fast bowlers such as Jeff Thomson and Joel Garner. The flat wickets found in Pakistan were not ideal for a bowler of his pace, but could sometimes surprise batsmen with his ability to make to ball seam, swing or bounce awkwardly. More importantly Sarfraz developed reverse swing. Commentators did not realise this was reverse swing at the time, though they realised that he had an uncanny ability to move the old ball in the air. He passed on his knowledge to Imran Khan, Wasim Akram and Waqar Younis, who made this new type of bowling famous in the late 1980s and 1990s. As a batsman he was a good lower-order striker of the ball particularly when driving and averaged over 40 in a series on three occasions.

=== Battle against match fixing ===
When Bob Woolmer was found dead in Jamaica, Sarfraz was quick to suggest that he was murdered, even before the postmortem, linking it to corruption in cricket. He subsequently raised concerns about the safety of Pakistani cricketers in West Indies, claiming Woolmer and Inzamam Ul Haq were getting threats from the bookies without naming his sources. He requested the involvement of Scotland Yard in the investigations, questioning the credibility of Jamaican police. He also alleged that the match Pakistan lost against West Indies in the 2007 Cricket World Cup was fixed.

== Post-retirement ==
=== Political career ===
In 1985, Sarfraz left cricket and joined politics.

He was elected as a member of the Provincial Assembly of the Punjab as an independent candidate in 1985 Pakistani general election. Under Nawaz Sharif, he was made the vice chairman of the Punjab Sports Board.

Later, Sarfraz joined the Pakistan People's Party (PPP) and was appointed as adviser on sports to the then PM Benazir Bhutto.

In 2011, Sarfraz joined Muttahida Qaumi Movement (MQM), having personally met Altaf Hussain some four years earlier.

=== Coaching career ===
In 2006, Sarfraz was selected as the bowling coach of the Delhi cricket team ahead of the 2006-2007 Ranji Trophy.

Preceded by Imran Khan	Pakistan cricket captain 1983–1984	Succeeded by Zaheer Abbas
Preceded by Ghulam Abed	Nelson Cricket Club; Professional; 1972–1973	Succeeded by Collis King
