= Andrew Hilditch =

Australian cricketer (born 1956)

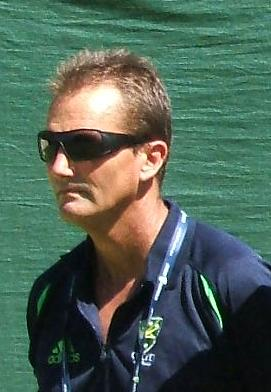

Personal information
- Full name: Andrew Mark Jefferson Hilditch
- Born: 20 May 1956 (age 70); North Adelaide, South Australia
- Batting: Right-handed
- Bowling: Right-arm medium

International information
- National side: Australia
- Test debut (cap 302): 10 February 1979 v England
- Last Test: 8 November 1985 v New Zealand
- ODI debut (cap 52): 24 January 1979 v England
- Last ODI: 3 June 1985 v England

Domestic team information
- Years: Team
- 1976/77–1980/81: New South Wales
- 1982/83–1991/92: South Australia

Career statistics
Competition	Test	ODI
Matches	18	8
Runs scored	1,073	226
Batting average	31.55	28.25
100s/50s	2/6	0/1
Top score	119	72
Catches/stumpings	13/–	1/–
- Source: CricInfo, 12 December 2005

Andrew Mark Jefferson Hilditch (born 20 May 1956) is a former Australian international cricketer who played in 18 Test matches and eight One Day Internationals from 1979 to 1985. He played for New South Wales from 1977 to 1981 and for South Australia from 1982 to 1992. He was an Australian cricket selector from 1996 until 2011.

== Early career ==
Hilditch was born in North Adelaide, South Australia, but made his First-class debut for New South Wales against Tasmania in Hobart in February 1977, scoring 5 and 42. Tasmania was not yet in the Sheffield Shield and the NSW team was mostly full of younger players. Hilditch played a further four matches for NSW in 1977/78 when the NSW team was weakened through the loss of players to World Series Cricket. He filled in as NSW captain in only his third match for them.

== First time in Australian team ==
The 1978/79 season was the breakthrough for Hilditch, establishing himself as a regular opener in the NSW team, scoring 778 runs at 45.76. His maiden first-class century came in his birth city of Adelaide, scoring 124 against South Australia. He also scored 93 against the touring England team.

With England leading the six-Test series 4–1, Hilditch was selected to make his Test debut in the final Test in Sydney. He scored just 3 and 1 but was retained for the following two-Test series against Pakistan.

In the first Test in Melbourne, Hilditch failed again in the first innings but scored a composed 62 in the second innings before being the second of nine dismissals for Sarfraz Nawaz.

In the second Test in Perth, Hilditch had made 29 as Australia chased 236 for victory in their second innings. When a wayward throw from a Pakistani fieldsman dribbled onto the pitch, Hilditch picked up the ball and handed it back to the bowler, Sarfraz Nawaz. Sarfraz appealed and the umpire had no option but to uphold the letter of the law and give Hilditch out. Hilditch was only the second player to be given out handled the ball in a Test match and the first non-striker.

Despite playing in the 1979 Cricket World Cup and in all six Tests on the 1979/80 Australian tour to India, Hilditch was dropped from the Australian team once the World Series Cricket players were available again and even found it difficult to get a regular game for NSW. Hilditch did not play First-class cricket in the 1981/82 season.

== Move to South Australia ==
For the 1982/83 season, Hilditch returned to his birth state of South Australia. He played most of the season batting at three and scored his first century (109) for his new team in Adelaide against a Tasmanian bowling attack led by West Indian Michael Holding.

Hilditch returned to his preferred opening role and enjoyed a brilliant 1983/84 season for South Australia scoring 937 runs at 58.56. This run included his highest first class score of 230 against Victoria in Melbourne.

== Australian recall ==
An innings of 184 against NSW in the opening match of the 1984/85 Sheffield Shield, plus a string of other good scores, led to his recall to the Australian Test team for the fourth Test against the West Indies at Melbourne. Hilditch made 70 and 113, his maiden Test century, to not only win the Man of the Match award, but also help end the West Indies then-record run of 11 consecutive Test victories. For the next Test in Sydney, Hilditch was named as Australian vice-captain.

Hilditch retained his vice-captaincy role for the 1985 Australian tour of England. He began the tour, scoring 119, his highest Test innings, and 80 in the first Test loss at Headingley. He was then dismissed three times in the forties in the middle of the series. In the second Test at Lord's with Australia chasing a small target, Hilditch played a hook shot against an Ian Botham bouncer and was caught on the leg side boundary. In the fifth Test at Edgbaston, Hilditch again fell to Botham in the same manner. This happened a third time in the sixth Test at The Oval. Hilditch gained a reputation as a compulsive player of the hook shot.

On returning to Australia, Hilditch played against New Zealand in Brisbane and was twice caught at fine leg, again playing the hook. Hilditch's international career was over - he was dropped from the Australian test team and never regained his place.

== Post-Test career ==
Following being dropped from the test team Hilditch suffered a big loss of form. However he recovered and established himself for South Australia and was made captain of the team for the 1990/91 season. He finished the 1991/92 as South Australia's leading runscorer for the season and then retired to concentrate on his career in law.

Hilditch re-appeared on the Australian cricket scene as a national selector in 1996/97. He became the chairman of the selection panel in April 2006 following the resignation of Trevor Hohns. When he became chairman, Australia were first placed in the ICC Test rankings, but fell to fifth place by October 2010, shortly before his removal in August 2011. Criticism by some members of the press and former players included his missing the Third Test in 2009 to walk on the beach with his daughter and dog, the removal of Brad Hodge from the test team two matches after making a double century, the selectors' use of ten spinners in the four years after the retirement of Shane Warne, and the removal of Simon Katich's contract after he had been the second highest Test run scorer in the world after Alastair Cook since his Test recall. Hilditch is the son-in-law of former Australian captain and coach, Bob Simpson.

Hilditch is a partner at national law firm Barry.Nilsson. He specialises in insurance law.
