= New Zealand cricket team in Bangladesh in 2023–24 =

International cricket tour

New Zealand men's cricket team in Bangladesh in 2023–24
	Bangladesh	New Zealand
- Dates: 21 September – 10 December 2023
Captains	Najmul Hossain Shanto (Tests); Liton Das (Note: Najmul Hossain Shanto captained Bangladesh in the third ODI.) (ODIs)	Tim Southee (Tests); Lockie Ferguson (ODIs)

Test series
- Result: 2-match series drawn 1–1
Most runs	Najmul Hossain Shanto (166)	Glenn Phillips (181)
Most wickets	Taijul Islam (15)	Ajaz Patel (14)
- Player of the series: Taijul Islam (Ban)

One Day International series
- Results: New Zealand won the 3-match series 2–0
Most runs	Najmul Hossain Shanto (76)	Henry Nicholls (143)
Most wickets	Mustafizur Rahman (5)	Ish Sodhi (6)
- Player of the series: Henry Nicholls (NZ)

The New Zealand cricket team toured Bangladesh in September 2023 to play three One Day International (ODI) matches. The matches were used as preparation for both teams ahead of the 2023 Cricket World Cup. Following the World Cup, the New Zealand team returned in November 2023 to play two Test matches. The Test series formed part of 2023–2025 ICC World Test Championship. The International Cricket Council (ICC) finalized the bilateral series in a press release.

Initially, New Zealand was scheduled to play a two-day practice match in Sylhet before the test series. However, after a prolonged World Cup campaign, New Zealand Cricket (NZC) requested to cancel the practice match, to avoid tiredness of the players.

== Squads ==
Bangladesh		New Zealand	
Tests	ODIs	Tests	ODIs
Najmul Hossain Shanto (c); Khaled Ahmed; Mominul Haque; Nayeem Hasan; Nurul Hasan (wk); Zakir Hasan; Shahadat Hossain; Shadman Islam; Shoriful Islam; Taijul Islam; Mahmudul Hasan Joy; Hasan Mahmud; Mehidy Hasan Miraz; Hasan Murad; Mushfiqur Rahim	Liton Das (c, wk); Khaled Ahmed; Nasum Ahmed; Anamul Haque (wk); Mahedi Hasan; Mehidy Hasan Miraz; Tanzid Hasan Tamim; Zakir Hasan (wk); Rishad Hossain; Towhid Hridoy; Tamim Iqbal; Shoriful Islam; Mahmudullah; Mushfiqur Rahim; Mustafizur Rahman; Nurul Hasan (wk); Tanzim Hasan Sakib; Najmul Hossain Shanto; Soumya Sarkar	Tim Southee (c); Tom Blundell (wk); Devon Conway; ~~Matt Henry~~; Kyle Jamieson; Tom Latham; Daryl Mitchell; Henry Nicholls; Ajaz Patel; Glenn Phillips; Rachin Ravindra; Mitchell Santner; Ish Sodhi; Kane Williamson; Will Young; Neil Wagner	Lockie Ferguson (c); Finn Allen (wk); Tom Blundell (wk); Trent Boult; Chad Bowes; Dane Cleaver (wk); Dean Foxcroft; Kyle Jamieson; Cole McConchie; Adam Milne; Henry Nicholls; Rachin Ravindra; Ish Sodhi; Blair Tickner; Will Young

Bangladesh rested Liton Das, Tamim Iqbal from the third ODI while Mustafizur Rahman, Soumya Sarkar and Khaled Ahmed were excluded from the squad. Najmul Hossain Shanto, Mushfiqur Rahim, Mehidy Hasan Miraz and Shoriful Islam were included in the squad for the third ODI, while Shanto being named the captain of Bangladesh for the third ODI.

On 17 November 2023, Neil Wagner replaced injured Matt Henry in the New Zealand's Test squad.

== ODI series ==
=== 1st ODI ===
21 September 2023
14:00 (D/N)
Scorecard

New Zealand; 136/5 (33.4 overs)	v	Bangladesh
Will Young 58 (91); Mustafizur Rahman 3/27 (7 overs)

No result
Sher-e-Bangla National Cricket Stadium, Dhaka
Umpires: Nitin Menon (Ind) and Sharfuddoula (Ban)

- Bangladesh won the toss and elected to field.
- No further play was possible due to rain.

=== 2nd ODI ===
23 September 2023
14:00 (D/N)
Scorecard

New Zealand; 254 (49.2 overs)	v	Bangladesh; 168 (41.1 overs)
Tom Blundell 68 (66); Mahedi Hasan 3/45 (10 overs)		Mahmudullah 49 (76); Ish Sodhi 6/39 (10 overs)

New Zealand won by 86 runs
Sher-e-Bangla National Cricket Stadium, Dhaka
Umpires: Marais Erasmus (SA) and Sharfuddoula (Ban)
Player of the match: Ish Sodhi (NZ)

- New Zealand won the toss and elected to bat.
- Khaled Ahmed (Ban) made his ODI debut.
- Ish Sodhi (NZ) took his first five-wicket haul in ODIs.
- Ish Sodhi became the first New Zealand spinner to take 6 wickets in an ODI.
- This was New Zealand's first win in an ODI in Bangladesh since 2008.

=== 3rd ODI ===
26 September 2023
14:00 (D/N)
Scorecard

Bangladesh; 171 (34.3 overs)	v	New Zealand; 175/3 (34.5 overs)
Najmul Hossain Shanto 76 (84); Adam Milne 4/34 (6.3 overs)		Will Young 70 (80); Shariful Islam 2/32 (6 overs)

New Zealand won by 7 wickets
Sher-e-Bangla National Cricket Stadium, Dhaka
Umpires: Gazi Sohel (Ban) and Nitin Menon (Ind)
Player of the match: Will Young (NZ)

- Bangladesh won the toss and elected to bat.
- Zakir Hasan (Ban) and Dean Foxcroft (NZ) both made their ODI debuts.
- Najmul Hossain Shanto captained Bangladesh for the first time in ODIs.

== Test series ==
=== 1st Test ===
28 November – 2 December 2023
Scorecard

Bangladesh	v	New Zealand
310 (85.1 overs); Mahmudul Hasan Joy 86 (166); Glenn Phillips 4/53 (16 overs)		317 (101.5 overs); Kane Williamson 104 (205); Taijul Islam 4/109 (39 overs)
338 (100.4 overs); Najmul Hossain Shanto 105 (198); Ajaz Patel 4/148 (36.4 overs)		181 (71.1 overs); Daryl Mitchell 58 (120); Taijul Islam 6/75 (31.1 overs)

Bangladesh won by 150 runs
Sylhet International Cricket Stadium, Sylhet
Umpires: Ahsan Raza (Pak) and Paul Reiffel (Aus)
Player of the match: Taijul Islam (Ban)

- Bangladesh won the toss and elected to bat.
- Najmul Hossain Shanto captained Bangladesh for the first time in Tests.
- Shahadat Hossain (Ban) made his Test debut.
- Najmul Hossain Shanto became the first Bangladeshi batter to score a century in his first Test as a captain.
- This was the first win for Bangladesh against New Zealand in Bangladesh in Tests.
- World Test Championship points: Bangladesh 12, New Zealand 0.

=== 2nd Test ===
6–9 December 2023
Scorecard

Bangladesh	v	New Zealand
172 (66.2 overs); Mushfiqur Rahim 35 (83); Glenn Phillips 3/31 (12 overs)		180 (37.1 overs); Glenn Phillips 87 (72); Taijul Islam 3/64 (16.1 overs)
144 (35 overs); Zakir Hasan 59 (86); Ajaz Patel 6/57 (18 overs)		139/6 (39.4 overs); Glenn Phillips 40* (48); Mehidy Hasan Miraz 3/51 (15.4 overs)

New Zealand won by 4 wickets
Sher-e-Bangla National Cricket Stadium, Dhaka
Umpires: Paul Reiffel (Aus) and Rod Tucker (Aus)
Player of the match: Glenn Phillips (NZ)

- Bangladesh won the toss and elected to bat.
- No play was possible on day 2 due to rain.
- Mushfiqur Rahim became the first Bangladeshi batter to be dismissed for obstructing the field and only the second batter in Tests to be dismissed in such manner.
- World Test Championship points: New Zealand 12, Bangladesh 0.
