= South African cricket team in England in 2017 =

International cricket tour

	England	South Africa
- Dates: 19 May – 8 August 2017
Captains	Joe Root (Tests); Eoin Morgan (ODIs & T20Is)	Faf du Plessis (Note: Dean Elgar was South Africa's captain for the first Test, as Faf du Plessis was on paternity leave.) (Tests); AB de Villiers (ODIs & T20Is)

Test series
- Result: England won the 4-match series 3–1
Most runs	Joe Root (461)	Hashim Amla (330)
Most wickets	Moeen Ali (25)	Morné Morkel (19)
- Player of the series: Moeen Ali (Eng); Morné Morkel (SA)

One Day International series
- Results: England won the 3-match series 2–1
Most runs	Eoin Morgan (160)	Hashim Amla (152)
Most wickets	Chris Woakes (4); Liam Plunkett (4)	Kagiso Rabada (7)
- Player of the series: Eoin Morgan (Eng)

Twenty20 International series
- Results: England won the 3-match series 2–1
Most runs	Jonny Bairstow (107)	AB de Villiers (146)
Most wickets	Tom Curran (5)	Dane Paterson (5)

The South African cricket team toured England and Wales between May and August 2017, playing three One Day Internationals (ODIs), three Twenty20 Internationals (T20Is) and four Test matches. The ODI matches were in preparation for the 2017 ICC Champions Trophy, which took place in England and Wales during June. Extra security was provided to South Africa for the ODI series following the Manchester Arena bombing. England won the ODI series 2–1 and the T20 series 2–1.

Ahead of the ODI series, South Africa played one-day warm-up matches against Northamptonshire and Sussex. South Africa were scheduled to play a Twenty20 tour match against Leicestershire, but this was cancelled due to a clash with the Champions Trophy. Prior to the Test series, South Africa played a three-day game against the England Lions at Worcester.

For the Test series, Joe Root captained England for the first time. For South Africa, their Test captain Faf du Plessis missed the first Test following the birth of his first child. Dean Elgar replaced him as captain, leading South Africa for the first time. England went on to win the Test series 3–1, their first home series win against South Africa since 1998. Moeen Ali made 252 runs and took 25 wickets, making him the first player ever to make 250 runs and take 25 wickets in a four-match series.

== Squads ==
Tests		ODIs		T20Is	
England	South Africa	England	South Africa	England	South Africa
Joe Root (c); Moeen Ali; James Anderson; Jonny Bairstow (wk); Gary Ballance; Stuart Broad; Alastair Cook; Liam Dawson; Steven Finn; Keaton Jennings; Dawid Malan; Toby Roland-Jones; Ben Stokes; Tom Westley; Mark Wood	Faf du Plessis (c); Hashim Amla; Temba Bavuma; Theunis de Bruyn; Quinton de Kock (wk); JP Duminy; Dean Elgar; Heino Kuhn; Keshav Maharaj; Aiden Markram; Morné Morkel; Chris Morris; Duanne Olivier; Andile Phehlukwayo; Vernon Philander; Kagiso Rabada	Eoin Morgan (c); Moeen Ali; Jonny Bairstow; Jake Ball; Sam Billings; Jos Buttler (wk); Alex Hales; Liam Plunkett; Adil Rashid; Joe Root; Jason Roy; Ben Stokes; David Willey; Chris Woakes; Mark Wood; Liam Dawson; Steven Finn; Toby Roland-Jones	AB de Villiers (c); Hashim Amla; Farhaan Behardien; Quinton de Kock (wk); Faf du Plessis; Jean-Paul Duminy; Keshav Maharaj; David Miller; Chris Morris; Morné Morkel; Wayne Parnell; Andile Phehlukwayo; Dwaine Pretorius; Kagiso Rabada; Imran Tahir	Eoin Morgan (c); Jonny Bairstow; Sam Billings; Jos Buttler (wk); Mason Crane; Tom Curran; Liam Dawson; Alex Hales; Chris Jordan; Liam Livingstone; Dawid Malan; Craig Overton; Liam Plunkett; Jason Roy; David Willey; Mark Wood	AB de Villiers (c); Farhaan Behardien; Reeza Hendricks; Imran Tahir; David Miller; Morné Morkel; Chris Morris; Mangaliso Mosehle (wk); Wayne Parnell; Dane Paterson; Andile Phehlukwayo; Dwaine Pretorius; Tabraiz Shamsi; JJ Smuts

Steven Finn, Toby Roland-Jones and Liam Dawson were not in England's initial ODI squad, but were called up prior to the 3rd ODI. Mark Wood was selected for the 1st T20I, Jonny Bairstow for the first two T20Is and Craig Overton was selected for the last two T20Is. Dawid Malan and Tom Westley were added to England's squad ahead of the third Test. JP Duminy was released from South Africa's squad ahead of the third Test. Steven Finn was added to the England squad for the final Test as a replacement for Mark Wood.

== Tour matches ==
=== One-day: Sussex vs South Africans ===
19 May 2017 (D/N)
Scorecard

South Africans; 289/4 (32 overs)	v	Sussex; 223/9 (32 overs)
Quinton de Kock 104 (78); Abidine Sakande 2/62 (6 overs)		Harry Finch 62 (59); Kagiso Rabada 2/26 (3 overs)

South Africans won by 66 runs
County Cricket Ground, Hove
Umpires: Neil Mallender (Eng) and Billy Taylor (Eng)

- Sussex won the toss and elected to field.
- The match was reduced to 32 overs per side due to rain.
- Delray Rawlins (Sussex) made his List A debut.

=== One-day: Northamptonshire vs South Africans ===
21 May 2017
Scorecard

South Africans; 275/7 (50 overs)	v	Northamptonshire; 262 (47.1 overs)
Hashim Amla 59 (67); Saif Zaib 2/22 (3 overs)		Max Holden 55 (55); Chris Morris 3/36 (8 overs)

South Africans won by 13 runs
County Cricket Ground, Northampton
Umpires: Neil Bainton (Eng) and Martin Saggers (Eng)

- South Africans won the toss and elected to bat.
- Tom Sole (Northamptonshire) made his List A debut.

=== Three-day: England Lions vs South Africa ===
29 June – 1 July 2017
Scorecard

South Africa	v	England Lions
382/4d (97.3 overs); Hashim Amla 91 (148); George Garton 2/90 (21 overs)		266/4d (80.1 overs); Tom Westley 106* (165); Theunis de Bruyn 2/24 (7 overs)

Match drawn
New Road, Worcester
Umpires: Jeff Evans (Eng) and Stephen Gale (Eng)

- England Lions won the toss and elected to field.
- Only 20 overs were possible on day 1 due to rain.

== ODI series ==
=== 1st ODI ===
24 May 2017 (D/N)
Scorecard

England; 339/6 (50 overs)	v	South Africa; 267 (45 overs)
Eoin Morgan 107 (93); Andile Phehlukwayo 2/59 (9 overs)		Hashim Amla 73 (76); Chris Woakes 4/38 (8 overs)

England won by 72 runs
Headingley, Leeds
Umpires: Tim Robinson (Eng) and Rod Tucker (Aus)
Player of the match: Moeen Ali (Eng)

- South Africa won the toss and elected to field.
- England made the highest total by any team in an ODI at this venue.

=== 2nd ODI ===
27 May 2017
Scorecard

England; 330/6 (50 overs)	v	South Africa; 328/5 (50 overs)
Ben Stokes 101 (79); Kagiso Rabada 2/50 (10 overs)		Quinton de Kock 98 (103); Liam Plunkett 3/64 (10 overs)

England won by 2 runs
Rose Bowl, Southampton
Umpires: Rob Bailey (Eng) and Chris Gaffaney (NZ)
Player of the match: Ben Stokes (Eng)

- South Africa won the toss and elected to field.
- Keshav Maharaj (SA) made his ODI debut.

=== 3rd ODI ===
29 May 2017
Scorecard

England; 153 (31.1 overs)	v	South Africa; 156/3 (28.5 overs)
Jonny Bairstow 51 (67); Kagiso Rabada 4/33 (8 overs)		Hashim Amla 55 (54); Jake Ball 2/43 (10 overs)

South Africa won by 7 wickets
Lord's, London
Umpires: Michael Gough (Eng) and Rod Tucker (Aus)
Player of the match: Kagiso Rabada (SA)

- South Africa won the toss and elected to field.
- Toby Roland-Jones (Eng) made his ODI debut.
- Hashim Amla (SA) became the fastest batsman, in terms of innings, to reach 7,000 runs in ODIs (150).

== T20I series ==
=== 1st T20I ===
21 June 2017
Scorecard

South Africa; 142/3 (20 overs)	v	England; 143/1 (14.3 overs)
AB de Villiers 65* (58); Mark Wood 2/36 (4 overs)		Jonny Bairstow 60* (35); Andile Phehlukwayo 1/11 (1.3 overs)

England won by 9 wickets
Rose Bowl, Southampton
Umpires: Rob Bailey (Eng) and Tim Robinson (Eng)
Player of the match: Jonny Bairstow (Eng)

- South Africa won the toss and elected to bat.
- Mason Crane (Eng), Dwaine Pretorius and Tabraiz Shamsi (SA) all made their T20I debuts.
- AB de Villiers became the second batsman for South Africa to pass 1,500 runs in T20Is.

=== 2nd T20I ===
23 June 2017
Scorecard

South Africa; 174/8 (20 overs)	v	England; 171/6 (20 overs)
AB de Villiers 46 (20); Tom Curran 3/33 (4 overs)		Jason Roy 67 (45); Chris Morris 2/18 (4 overs)

South Africa won by 3 runs
County Ground, Taunton
Umpires: Rob Bailey (Eng) and Michael Gough (Eng)
Player of the match: Chris Morris (SA)

- England won the toss and elected to field.
- Tom Curran and Liam Livingstone (Eng) made their T20I debuts.
- Jason Roy (Eng) became the first batsman to be given out obstructing the field in a T20I.

=== 3rd T20I ===
25 June 2017
Scorecard

England; 181/8 (20 overs)	v	South Africa; 162/7 (20 overs)
Dawid Malan 78 (44); Dane Paterson 4/32 (4 overs)		Mangaliso Mosehle 36 (22); Chris Jordan 3/31 (4 overs)

England won by 19 runs
Sophia Gardens, Cardiff
Umpires: Michael Gough (Eng) and Tim Robinson (Eng)
Player of the match: Dawid Malan (Eng)

- South Africa won the toss and elected to field.
- Dawid Malan (Eng) made his T20I debut.
- Dawid Malan made the highest total for an England batsman on debut in a T20I.

== Test series ==
=== 1st Test ===
6–10 July 2017 (Note: While five days of play were scheduled for each Test, the first, second and fourth Tests reached a result within four days.)
Scorecard

England	v	South Africa
458 (105.3 overs); Joe Root 190 (234); Morné Morkel 4/115 (25.3 overs)		361 (105 overs); Temba Bavuma 59 (130); Moeen Ali 4/59 (20 overs)
233 (87.1 overs); Alastair Cook 69 (192); Keshav Maharaj 4/85 (32.1 overs)		119 (36.4 overs); Temba Bavuma 21 (41); Moeen Ali 6/53 (15 overs)

England won by 211 runs
Lord's, London
Umpires: Sundaram Ravi (Ind) and Paul Reiffel (Aus)
Player of the match: Moeen Ali (Eng)

- England won the toss and elected to bat.
- Heino Kuhn (SA) made his Test debut.
- Joe Root played his first Test as captain of England and Dean Elgar played his first Test as captain of South Africa.
- Joe Root made the highest score by an England batsman in their first Test as captain.
- Moeen Ali (Eng) became the fifth-fastest player, in terms of matches played, to score 2,000 runs and take 100 wickets in Tests (38).
- Moeen Ali took his first ten-wicket haul in Tests, and is the first player for England to score a half-century while taking ten wickets in a match since Ian Botham took 13 wickets and scored 114 runs against India in the Golden Jubilee Test in 1980.
- This was South Africa's biggest loss in terms of runs in a Test in England.

=== 2nd Test ===
14–18 July 2017
Scorecard

South Africa	v	England
335 (96.2 overs); Hashim Amla 78 (149); James Anderson 5/72 (23.2 overs)		205 (51.5 overs); Joe Root 78 (76); Keshav Maharaj 3/21 (10 overs)
343/9d (104 overs); Hashim Amla 87 (180); Moeen Ali 4/78 (16 overs)		133 (44.2 overs); Alastair Cook 42 (76); Vernon Philander 3/24 (10 overs)

South Africa won by 340 runs
Trent Bridge, Nottingham
Umpires: Simon Fry (Aus) and Paul Reiffel (Aus)
Player of the match: Vernon Philander (SA)

- South Africa won the toss and elected to bat.
- James Anderson (Eng) became the first fast bowler to take 300 wickets in Tests played at home.
- Hashim Amla (SA) became the fourth batsman for South Africa to score 8,000 runs in Tests.

=== 3rd Test ===
27–31 July 2017
Scorecard

England	v	South Africa
353 (103.2 overs); Ben Stokes 112 (153); Morné Morkel 3/70 (28.2 overs)		175 (58.4 overs); Temba Bavuma 52 (110); Toby Roland-Jones 5/57 (16.4 overs)
313/8d (79.5 overs); Jonny Bairstow 63 (58); Keshav Maharaj 3/50 (13.5 overs)		252 (77.1 overs); Dean Elgar 136 (228); Moeen Ali 4/45 (16.1 overs)

England won by 239 runs
The Oval, London
Umpires: Aleem Dar (Pak) and Joel Wilson (WI)
Player of the match: Ben Stokes (Eng)

- England won the toss and elected to bat.
- Only 59 overs of play were possible on day 1 due to rain.
- Rain before the tea interval on day 3 prevented any further play.
- Dawid Malan, Toby Roland-Jones and Tom Westley (Eng) all made their Test debuts.
- This was the 100th Test played at this venue.
- Toby Roland-Jones (Eng) took his first five-wicket haul in Tests.
- Four South Africa batsmen were dismissed for golden ducks in their second innings, the first such instance in Tests.
- Moeen Ali (Eng) took a hat-trick with the final three wickets of South Africa's second innings, the first hat-trick at this venue in Tests.

=== 4th Test ===
4–8 August 2017
Scorecard

England	v	South Africa
362 (108.4 overs); Jonny Bairstow 99 (145); Kagiso Rabada 4/91 (26 overs)		226 (72.1 overs); Temba Bavuma 46 (93); James Anderson 4/38 (17 overs)
243 (69.1 overs); Moeen Ali 75* (66); Morné Morkel 4/41 (13.1 overs)		202 (62.5 overs); Hashim Amla 83 (159); Moeen Ali 5/68 (19.5 overs)

England won by 177 runs
Old Trafford, Manchester
Umpires: Aleem Dar (Pak) and Kumar Dharmasena (SL)
Player of the match: Moeen Ali (Eng)

- England won the toss and elected to bat.
- One hour of play was lost at the end of day 3 due to rain.
