= Pakistani cricket team in South Africa in 2013–14 =

Pakistan in South Africa in 2013–14
	South Africa	Pakistan
- Dates: 20 November 2013 – 30 November 2013
Captains	AB de Villiers (ODIs); Faf du Plessis (T20Is)	Misbah-ul-Haq (ODIs); Mohammad Hafeez (T20Is)

One Day International series
- Results: Pakistan won the 3-match series 2–1
Most runs	Hashim Amla (142)	Ahmed Shehzad (137)
Most wickets	Dale Steyn (9)	Saeed Ajmal (5)
- Player of the series: Saeed Ajmal (Pakistan)

Twenty20 International series
- Results: 2-match series drawn 1–1
Most runs	Hashim Amla (79)	Mohammad Hafeez (76)
Most wickets	Dale Steyn (2)	Shahid Afridi (4)
- Player of the series: Mohammad Hafeez (Pakistan)

The Pakistan national cricket team toured South Africa from 20 to 30 November 2013. The tour included three One Day Internationals (ODIs) and two Twenty20 Internationals (T20I) against South Africa. The Twenty20 series was drawn 1–1 while South Africa won the ODI series 3–0.

== Squads ==
South Africa		Pakistan
ODI	T20I	ODI and T20I
AB de Villiers (c & wk); Hashim Amla; Quinton de Kock (wk); Jean-Paul Duminy; Imran Tahir; Jacques Kallis; Ryan McLaren; David Miller; Morne Morkel; Wayne Parnell; Vernon Philander; Graeme Smith; Dale Steyn; Lonwabo Tsotsobe	Faf du Plessis (c); Hashim Amla; Henry Davids; Quinton de Kock (wk); AB de Villiers (wk); Jean-Paul Duminy; Imran Tahir; Jacques Kallis; Ryan McLaren; David Miller; Morne Morkel; Wayne Parnell; Aaron Phangiso; Vernon Philander; Dale Steyn; Lonwabo Tsotsobe; David Wiese	Abdur Rehman; Ahmed Shehzad; Anwar Ali; Asad Shafiq; Bilawal Bhatti; Junaid Khan; Misbah-ul-Haq (ODI Captain); Mohammad Hafeez (T20I Captain); Nasir Jamshed; Saeed Ajmal; Shahid Afridi; Sohaib Maqsood; Sohail Tanvir; Umar Akmal (wk); Umar Amin; Abdul Razzaq; Shoaib Malik

== T20I series ==
=== 1st T20I ===
20 November 2013
18:00 (D/N)
Scorecard

South Africa; 153/7 (20 overs)	v	Pakistan; 60/2 (9.1 overs)
Quinton de Kock 43 (33); Junaid Khan 2/24 (3 overs)		Nasir Jamshed 18 (25); JP Duminy 1/3 (1.1 overs)

South Africa won by 4 runs (D/L)
New Wanderers Stadium, Johannesburg
Umpires: Johan Cloete (SA) and Shaun George (SA)
Player of the match: Quinton de Kock (SA)

- Pakistan won the toss and elected to field.
- Rain stopped play after 9.1 overs in Pakistan's innings. Their par score was 64 runs according to the Duckworth–Lewis method.
- Bilawal Bhatti made his T20I debut for Pakistan.

=== 2nd T20I ===
22 November 2013
18:00 (D/N)
Scorecard

Pakistan; 176/4 (20 overs)	v	South Africa; 170/4 (20 overs)
Umar Akmal 64 (37); Dale Steyn 2/29 (4 overs)		Hashim Amla 48 (40); Shahid Afridi 3/28 (4 overs)

Pakistan won by 6 runs
Newlands Cricket Ground, Cape Town
Umpires: Johan Cloete (SA) and Shaun George (SA)
Player of the match: Mohammad Hafeez (Pak)

- Pakistan won the toss and elected to bat.

== ODI series ==
=== 1st ODI ===
25 November 2013
11:00

Pakistan; 218/9 (50 overs)	v	South Africa; 195 (48.1 overs)
Anwar Ali 43* (55); Dale Steyn 3/33 (10 overs)		Jacques Kallis 90 (71); Bilawal Bhatti 2/37 (7.1 overs)

Pakistan won by 23 runs
Newlands Cricket Ground, Cape Town
Umpires: Johan Cloete (SA) and Chris Gaffaney (NZ)
Player of the match: Anwar Ali (Pakistan)

- Pakistan won the toss and elected to bat.
- Anwar Ali and Bilawal Bhatti made their ODI debuts for Pakistan.

=== 2nd ODI ===
27 November 2013
10:00

Pakistan; 262 (45 overs)	v	South Africa; 261/6 (45 overs)
Ahmed Shehzad 102 (112); Dale Steyn 6/39 (9 overs)		Hashim Amla 98 (131); Junaid Khan 3/42 (9 overs)

Pakistan won by 1 run
St George's Park, Port Elizabeth
Umpires: Shaun George (RSA) and Bruce Oxenford (Aus)
Player of the match: Ahmed Shehzad (Pakistan)

- South Africa won the toss and elected to field.

=== 3rd ODI ===
30 November 2013
10:00
Scorecard

Pakistan; 179 (46.5 overs)	v	South Africa; 181/6 (38.4 overs)
Misbah-ul-Haq 79* (107); Vernon Philander 3/26 (10 overs)		AB de Villiers 48* (63); Saeed Ajmal 2/34 (10 overs)

South Africa won by 4 wickets
Centurion Park, Centurion
Umpires: Chris Gaffaney (NZ) and Shaun George (RSA)
Player of the match: Vernon Philander (South Africa)

- South Africa won the toss and elected to field.
- Henry Davids made his ODI debut for South Africa.
