= Preeti Bose =

Indian cricketer (born 1992)

Personal information
- Born: 20 April 1992 (age 34); Sonipat, Haryana
- Batting: Right-handed
- Bowling: Left-arm orthodox
- Role: Bowler

International information
- National side: India
- Only ODI (cap 116): 19 February 2016 v Sri Lanka
- T20I debut (cap 52): 18 November 2016 v West Indies
- Last T20I: 4 December 2016 v Pakistan

Domestic team information
- Years: Team
- 2010/11–2018/19: Haryana
- 2019/20–present: Railways
- 2023: Royal Challengers Bangalore

Career statistics
Competition	WODI	WT20I
Matches	1	5
Runs scored	–	2
Batting average	–	–
100s/50s	–	0/0
Top score	–	2*
Balls bowled	48	96
Wickets	2	5
Bowling average	4.00	15.80
5 wickets in innings	0	0
10 wickets in match	0	0
Best bowling	2/8	3/14
Catches/stumpings	0/–	1/–
- Source: ESPNcricinfo, 12 November 2019

Preeti Bose (born 20 April 1992) is an Indian cricketer. She plays for Haryana women's cricket team in domestic matches. She is the first woman player from Haryana to play for the India women's team, Railways team and T20 Women's Asia Cup final. She was born at Sonipat.

She plays for Royal Challengers Bangalore in the Women's Premier League (WPL).

== International career ==
On 19 February 2016, Bose played her first one-day international match for India Women against Sri Lanka Women and took two wickets.

Preeti Bose's bowling helped India win the 2016 Women's Asia Cup T20 title by 17 runs against Pakistan in Bangkok.
