= 2026–27 Senior Women's Inter Zonal One-Day Trophy =

Domestic cricket competition

- Dates: 17 – 27 February 2027
- Administrator: BCCI
- Cricket format: 50-over cricket
- Tournament format(s): Round-robin tournament and final
- Host: India
- Participants: 6
- Matches: 16
- Official website: bcci.tv

The 2026–27 Senior Women's Inter Zonal One-Day Trophy will be the 3rd edition of the Senior Women's Inter Zonal One-Day Trophy, a domestic one day cricket competition in India. The tournament will take place from 17 February to 27 February 2027 with six zonal teams taking part. The tournament formed part of the 2026–27 Indian domestic cricket season, announced by the Board of Control for Cricket in India (BCCI) in June 2026. East Zone were the defending champions.

== Competition format ==
Six teams competed in the tournament, representing regions of India. Each team played each other once in a round-robin format. The top two teams in the group progressed to the final. Matches were played using a one-day format with 50 overs per side.

The group worked on a points system with positions within the group being based on the total points. Points were awarded as follows:

Win: 4 points.
Tie: 2 points.
Loss: 0 points.
No Result/Abandoned: 2 points.

If points in the final table were equal, teams were separated by most wins, then head-to-head record, then Net Run Rate.
