= 2025–26 Senior Women's Inter Zonal One-Day Trophy =

Domestic cricket competition

- Dates: 5 – 15 March 2026
- Administrator(s): BCCI
- Cricket format: 50-over cricket
- Tournament format(s): Round-robin tournament and final
- Host(s): India
- Participants: 6
- Matches: 16
- Official website: bcci.tv

The 2025–26 Senior Women's Inter Zonal One-Day Trophy will be the second edition of the Senior Women's Inter Zonal One-Day Trophy, a domestic one day cricket competition in India. The tournament will take place from 5 to 15 March 2026. with six zonal teams taking part. North Zone were the defending champions.

== Competition format ==
Six teams competed in the tournament, representing regions of India. Each team played each other once in a round-robin format. The top two teams in the group progressed to the final. Matches were played using a one-day format with 50 overs per side.

The group worked on a points system with positions within the group being based on the total points. Points were awarded as follows:

Win: 4 points.
Tie: 2 points.
Loss: 0 points.
No Result/Abandoned: 2 points.

If points in the final table were equal, teams were separated by most wins, then head-to-head record, then Net Run Rate.
