= Senior Women's Inter Zonal One-Day Trophy =

Women's List A cricket tournament in India

- Countries: India
- Administrator: BCCI
- Format: List A cricket
- First edition: 2022–23
- Latest edition: 2025–26
- Next edition: 2026–27
- Tournament format: Round-robin and knockout
- Number of teams: 6
- Current champion: North Zone (1st title)
- Most successful: North Zone (1 titles)
- Website: www.bcci.tv
- 2026–27

The Senior Women's Inter Zonal One Day Trophy is a women's List A cricket competition in India. organised by the Board of Control for Cricket in India. The competition began in 2022–23.

== Teams ==
Team	Wins	Runners-up
Central Zone	0	1
East Zone	0	0
North Zone	1	0
South Zone	0	
West Zone	0	
North East Zone

== Tournament results ==
Season	Winner	Runner up	Refs
2022–23	North Zone	Central Zone	
2025–26	West Zone	Central Zone	
2026–27
