= Bangladesh women's cricket team in South Africa in 2013–14 =

Bangladeshi women's cricket team in South Africa in 2013–14
	South Africa	Bangladesh
- Dates: 12 – 24 September 2013
Captains	Mignon du Preez	Salma Khatun

One Day International series
- Results: South Africa won the 3-match series 3–0
Most runs	Lizelle Lee (166)	Ayasha Rahman (109)
Most wickets	Sunette Loubser (7)	Jahanara Alam (3); Khadija Tul Kubra (3)

Twenty20 International series
- Results: South Africa won the 3-match series 3–0
Most runs	Mignon du Preez (89)	Ayasha Rahman (84)
Most wickets	Marizanne Kapp (6)	Salma Khatun (2); Khadija Tul Kubra (2)

The Bangladesh women's national cricket team toured South Africa in September 2013 to play 3 One Day Internationals and 3 Twenty20 Internationals (T20I). South Africa won both series 3–0.

Marizanne Kapp claimed a hat-trick in the second T20I, which secured the T20I series for South Africa.

== Squads ==
South Africa	Bangladesh
Mignon du Preez (c); Bernadine Bezuidenhout; Trisha Chetty (wk); Moseline Daniels; Shabnim Ismail; Marizanne Kapp; Alexis le Breton; Lizelle Lee; Marcia Letsoalo; Sunette Loubser; Suné Luus; Yolandi Potgieter; Elriesa Theunissen-Fourie; Dane van Niekerk	Salma Khatun (c); Rumana Ahmed; Jahanara Alam; Panna Ghosh; Fargana Hoque; Shathira Jakir; Fahima Khatun; Khadija Tul Kubra; Lata Mondal; Ritu Moni; Ayasha Rahman; Lily Rani Biswas; Shaila Sharmin; Nuzhat Tasnia (wk); Sultana Yesmin

== Tour Match: South Africa Emerging Players v Bangladesh ==
18 September 2013
Scorecard

Bangladesh; 129 (43.2 overs)	v	South Africa Emerging Players; 130/2 (32.4 overs)
Jahanara Alam 28 (46); Elriesa Theunissen-Fourie 3/8 (6 overs)		Nadine Moodley 57 (84); Khadija Tul Kubra 1/20 (5 overs)

South Africa Emerging Players won by 8 wickets
Olympia Park, Rustenburg
Umpires: Brad White (SA) and Dennis Smith (SA)

- South Africa Emerging Players won the toss and elected to field.

== WT20I Series ==
=== 1st T20I ===
12 September 2013
Scorecard

Bangladesh; 72/4 (20 overs)	v	South Africa; 76/1 (13.3 overs)
Lata Mondal 31* (39); Moseline Daniels 1/4 (4 overs)		Trisha Chetty 32* (34); Khadija Tul Kubra 1/21 (2.3 overs)

South Africa Women won by 9 wickets
Senwes Park, Potchefstroom
Umpires: Dennis Smith (SA) and Roderick Ellis (SA)
Player of the match: Trisha Chetty (SA)

- Bangladesh Women won the toss and elected to bat.
- Alexis le Breton and Lizelle Lee (SA) both made their WT20I debuts.

=== 2nd T20I ===
14 September 2013
Scorecard

Bangladesh; 84/6 (20 overs)	v	South Africa; 85/1 (11.3 overs)
Ayasha Rahman 34 (39); Marizanne Kapp 4/6 (4 overs)		Trisha Chetty 38* (34); Rumana Ahmed 1/22 (3 overs)

South Africa Women won by 9 wickets
Senwes Park, Potchefstroom
Umpires: Dennis Smith (SA) and Brad White (SA)
Player of the match: Marizanne Kapp (SA)

- Bangladesh Women won the toss and elected to bat.

=== 3rd T20I ===
15 September 2013
Scorecard

South Africa; 109/4 (20 overs)	v	Bangladesh; 106/4 (20 overs)
Mignon du Preez 52 (52); Salma Khatun 2/7 (4 overs)		Ayasha Rahman 42 (57); Marizanne Kapp 2/20 (4 overs)

South Africa Women won by 3 runs
Senwes Park, Potchefstroom
Umpires: Brad White (SA) and Roderick Ellis (SA)
Player of the match: Mignon du Preez (SA)

- South Africa Women won the toss and elected to bat.
- Shathira Jakir (Ban) and Shaila Sharmin (Ban) both made their WT20I debuts.

== WODI Series ==
=== 1st ODI ===
20 September 2013
Scorecard

Bangladesh; 149/8 (50 overs)	v	South Africa; 153/4 (37.5 overs)
Fargana Hoque 63 (108); Sunette Loubser 3/28 (10 overs)		Lizelle Lee 77 (130); Khadija Tul Kubra 3/43 (9.5 overs)

South Africa Women won by 6 wickets
Willowmoore Park, Benoni
Umpires: Allahudien Paleker (SA) and Rudi Birkenstock (SA)
Player of the match: Lizelle Lee (SA)

- South Africa Women won the toss and elected to field.
- Alexis le Breton, Lizelle Lee (SA) and Shaila Sharmin (Ban) all made their WODI debuts.

=== 2nd ODI ===
22 September 2013
Scorecard

South Africa; 237/4 (50 overs)	v	Bangladesh; 142 (48.3 overs)
Mignon du Preez 100* (105); Jahanara Alam 1/29 (6 overs)		Salma Khatun 36 (36); Sunette Loubser 3/15 (10 overs)

South Africa Women won by 95 runs
Wanderers Stadium, Johannesburg
Umpires: Allahudien Paleker (SA) and Bongani Jele (SA)
Player of the match: Mignon du Preez (SA)

- Bangladesh Women won the toss and elected to field.

=== 3rd ODI ===
24 September 2013
Scorecard

Bangladesh; 177 (48.3 overs)	v	South Africa; 178/2 (38 overs)
Ayasha Rahman 70 (115); Marcia Letsoalo 3/35 (9.3 overs)		Trisha Chetty 76* (111); Jahanara Alam 1/12 (3 overs)

South Africa Women won by 8 wickets
Centurion Park, Centurion
Umpires: Bongani Jele (SA) and Rudi Birkenstock (SA)
Player of the match: Trisha Chetty (SA)

- South Africa Women won the toss and elected to field.
