= List of South Africa women cricket series =

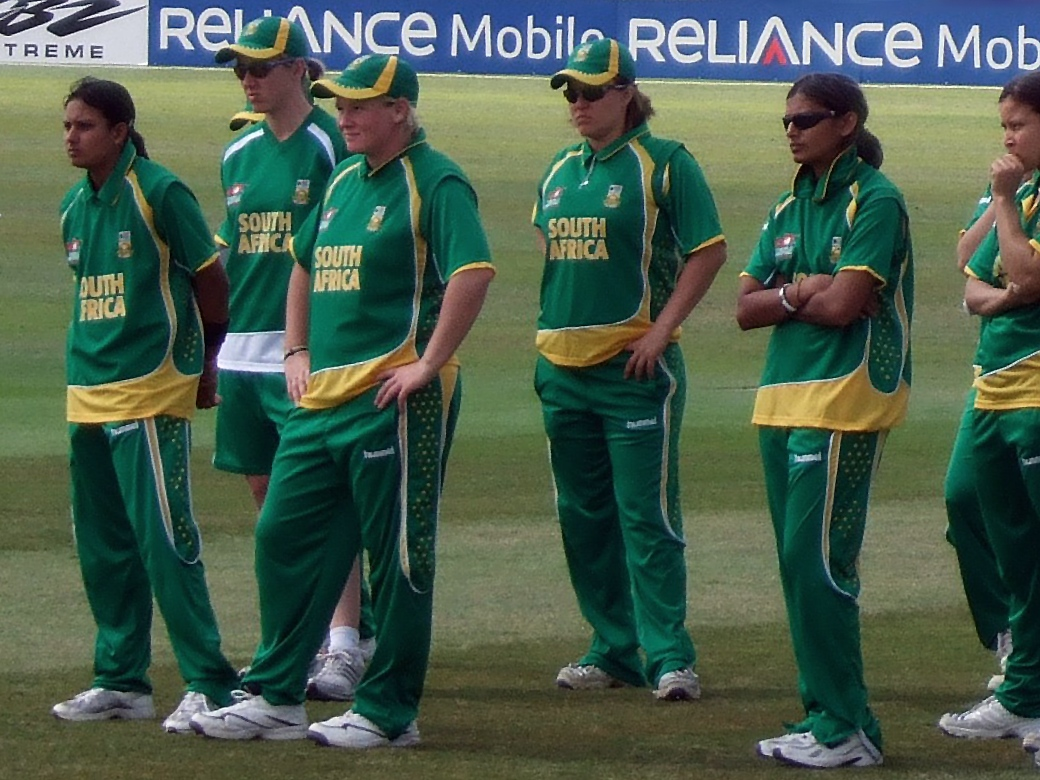
South Africa women at Taunton, 2009 ICC Women's World Twenty20

Since playing their first international cricket match in December 1960, the South Africa national women's cricket team have contested a number of cricket series against other nations, in all three forms of the game: Test, One Day International and Twenty20 International cricket. A cricket series can consist of any number of individual matches, but typically includes between one and five matches.

The first international cricket match involving South Africa women was a Test match in 1960, held at St George's Park, Port Elizabeth, the same venue as the one for first men's Test match in the country in 1889, and ended in a draw. South Africa then played a subsequent series against New Zealand in 1971–72. As part of the international campaign against apartheid, the Commonwealth of Nations signed the Gleneagles Agreement in 1977, excluding South Africa from competing in international sporting events. Because of this exclusion, they did not play another Test until hosting India in 2001–02, before facing England again in 2003, the Netherlands in 2007 and most recently India in 2014.

One Day International and Twenty20 International series have been contested regularly since 1997 and 2007 respectively.

== Key ==
- Season denotes the cricket season in which the series takes place.
- H/A/N denotes whether the venue is home (South Africa), away (opposition's home) or neutral.
- First match denotes the date on which the first match of the series commenced.
- Matches denotes how many matches were played in the series.
- W denotes how many matches in the series were won by South Africa.
- L denotes how many matches in the series were lost by South Africa.
- T denotes how many matches in the series were tied.
- Drawn denotes how many matches in the series were drawn.
- Won denotes that the series was won by South Africa.
- Lost denotes that the series was lost by South Africa.

== Test series ==
Series	Season	Opponent	H/A/N	First match	Matches	W	L	Drawn	Result	Ref
1	1960–61	England	Home	2 December 1960	4	0	1	3	Lost	
2	1971–72	New Zealand	Home	25 February 1972	3	0	1	2	Lost	
3	2001–02	India	Home	19 March 2002	1	0	1	0	Lost	
4	2003	England	Away	7 August 2003	2	0	1	1	Lost	
5	2007	Netherlands	Away	28 July 2007	1	1	0	0	Won	
6	2014–15	India	Away	16 November 2014	1	0	1	0	Lost	
Overall Total					12	1	5	6		

== One Day International series ==
Series	Season	Opponent/Event	H/A/N	First match	Matches	W	L	T	N/R	Aban	Result	Ref
1	1997	Ireland	Away	5 August 1997	3	3	0	0	0	0	Won	
2	1997	England	Away	15 August 1997	5	1	2	0	1	1	Lost	
3	1997–98	Women's Cricket World Cup	Neutral (in India)	9 December 1997	6	3	3	0	0	0	Eliminated in quarter-finals	
4	1998–99	Australia	Away	5 February 1999	3	0	2	0	0	1	Lost	
5	1998–99	New Zealand	Away	13 February 1999	3	0	3	0	0	0	Lost	
6	2000	England	Away	20 June 2000	5	2	3	0	0	0	Lost	
7	2000–01	Women's Cricket World Cup	Neutral (in New Zealand)	29 November 2000	8	4	4	0	0	0	Eliminated in semifinals	
8	2001–02	India	Home	7 March 2002	4	2	1	0	1	0	Won	
9	2003	England	Away	13 August 2003	3	1	2	0	0	0	Lost	
10	2003–04	England	Home	15 February 2004	5	1	4	0	0	0	Lost	
11	2004–05	England	Home	13 March 2005	2	0	2	0	0	0	Lost	
12	2004–05	Women's Cricket World Cup	Neutral (in South Africa)	22 March 2005	7	1	4	0	1	1	Eliminated in group-stage	
13	2004–05	West Indies	Home	5 April 2005	3	1	2	0	0	0	Lost	
14	2006–07	Pakistan	Home	20 January 2007	5	4	0	0	1	0	Won	
15	2007	Netherlands	Away	2 August 2007	3	3	0	0	0	0	Won	
16	2007–08	Women's Cricket World Cup Qualifier	Neutral (in South Africa)	22 March 2008	5	5	0	0	0	0	Won	
17	2008	Ireland	Neutral (in England)	31 July 2008	1	1	0	0	0	0	Won	
18	2008	England	Away	6 August 2008	5	0	4	0	0	1	Lost	
19	2008–09	Women's Cricket World Cup	Neutral (in Australia)	7 March 2009	4	1	3	0	0	0	Seventh place	
20	2009–10	West Indies	Home	16 October 2009	4	2	1	1	0	0	Won	
21	2010–11	Women's Cricket Challenge	Neutral (in South Africa)	6 October 2010	5	5	0	0	0	0	Won	
22	2011–12	England	Home	21 October 2011	3	0	3	0	0	0	Lost	
23	2011–12	Women's Cricket World Cup Qualifier	Neutral (in Bangladesh)	14 November 2011	6	4	2	0	0	0	Fourth place	
24	2012–13	Bangladesh	Away	6 September 2012	3	2	1	0	0	0	Won	
25	2012–13	West Indies	Away	7 January 2013	5	2	2	0	1	0	Drawn	
26	2012–13	Women's Cricket World Cup	Neutral (in India)	31 January 2013	7	2	5	0	0	0	Sixth place	
27	2013–14	Bangladesh	Home	20 September 2013	3	3	0	0	0	0	Won	
28	2013–14	Sri Lanka	Home	24 October 2013	3	2	0	0	1	0	Won	
29	2013–14	2013–14 PCB Women's Tri-Nation Series in Qatar	Neutral (in Qatar)	10 January 2014	5	3	1	0	0	1	Won	
30	2014–17	ICC Women's Championship	Home and Away	21 August 2014	18^{Note}	8^{Note}	9^{Note}	0^{Note}	1^{Note}	0^{Note}	Ongoing tournament	
31	2014–15	Sri Lanka	Away	15 October 2014	4**	2**	1*	0	1*	0	Won	
32	2014–15	India	Away	24 November 2014	3*	2*	1*	0	0	0	Won	
33	2014–15	Pakistan	Neutral (in UAE)	13 March 2015	3*	2*	1*	0	0	0	Won	
34	2015–16	Bangladesh	Away	October 2015	Cancelled							
35	2015–16	England	Home	7 February 2016	3*	1*	2*	0	0	0	Lost	
36	2015–16	West Indies	Home	24 February 2016	3*	1*	2*	0	0	0	Lost	
37	2016	Ireland	Away	5 August 2016	4	3	1	0	0	0	Won	
38	2016–17	Bangladesh	Home	10 September 2016	Cancelled							
39	2016–17	New Zealand	Home	8 October 2016	7**	2**	5**	0	0	0	Lost	
40	2016–17	Australia	Away	18 November 2016	[5**]						TBD	
Overall Total					151	71	67	1	7	5		

* Matches also valid and counted for ICC Women's Championship 2014–2017.
** The first 3 matches of this series were also part of the ICC Women's Championship 2014–2017, South Africa's results valid for the tournament were 1 won against Sri Lanka; 1 won and 2 lost against New Zealand.
Note: It includes matches played on multiple series listed below, therefore, to avoid double count, it is NOT included in the overall total matches count.

== Twenty20 International series ==
Series	Season	Opponent/Event	H/A/N	First match	Matches	W	L	N/R	Result	Ref
1	2007	New Zealand	Neutral (in England)	10 August 2007	1	0	1	0	Lost	
2	2007	England	Away	10 August 2007	1	0	1	0	Lost	
3	2008	Ireland	Neutral (in England)	1 August 2008	1	1	0	0	Won	
4	2008	England	Away	22 August 2008	3	0	3	0	Lost	
5	2009	Women's World Twenty20	Neutral (in England)	11 June 2009	3	0	3	0	Eliminated in group-stage	
6	2009–10	West Indies	Home	25 October 2009	3	0	3	0	Lost	
7	2010	Women's World Twenty20	Neutral (in West Indies)	5 May 2010	3	0	3	0	Eliminated in group-stage	
8	2010–11	Women's Cricket Challenge	Neutral (in South Africa)	14 October 2010	3	2	1	0	Third place	
9	2011–12	England	Home	27 October 2011	3	0	2	1	Lost	
10	2012–13	Bangladesh	Away	11 September 2012	3	2	1	0	Won	
11	2012	Women's World Twenty20	Neutral (in Sri Lanka)	26 September 2012	4	2	2	0	Eliminated in group-stage	
12	2012–13	West Indies	Away	19 January 2013	2	0	2	0	Lost	
13	2013–14	Bangladesh	Home	12 September 2013	3	3	0	0	Won	
14	2013–14	Sri Lanka	Home	31 October 2013	3	2	1	0	Won	
15	2013–14	PCB Qatar Women's 20-over Tri-Series	Neutral (in Qatar)	19 January 2014	5	3	2	0	Runners-Up	
16	2013–14	Women's World Twenty20	Neutral (in Bangladesh)	23 March 2014	5	3	2	0	Semifinals	
17	2014	England	Away	1 September 2014	3	0	3	0	Lost	
18	2014	Ireland	Neutral (in England)	9 September 2014	3	3	0	0	Won	
19	2014–15	Sri Lanka	Away	23 October 2014	3	2	1	0	Won	
20	2014–15	India	Away	30 November 2014	1	0	1	0	Lost	
21	2014–15	Pakistan	Neutral (in UAE)	19 March 2015	3	1	2	0	Lost	
22	2015–16	Bangladesh	Away	October 2015	Cancelled					
23	2015–16	England	Home	18 February 2016	3	1	2	0	Lost	
24	2015–16	West Indies	Home	4 March 2016	3	2	1	0	Won	
25	2015–16	Women's World Twenty20	Neutral (in India)	18 March 2016	4	1	3	0	Eliminated in group-stage	
26	2016	Ireland	Away	1 August 2016	2	1	1	0	Drawn	
27	2016–17	Bangladesh	Home	22 September 2016	Cancelled					
Overall Total					71	29	41	1		
