= South Africa women's cricket team in Bangladesh in 2012–13 =

South African women's cricket team in Bangladesh in 2012–13
	Bangladesh	South Africa
- Dates: 6 – 14 September 2012
Captains	Salma Khatun	Mignon du Preez

One Day International series
- Results: South Africa won the 3-match series 2–1
Most runs	Lata Mondal (84)	Marizanne Kapp (50)
Most wickets	Khadija Tul Kubra (5)	Shabnim Ismail (7)
- Player of the series: Shabnim Ismail (SA)

Twenty20 International series
- Results: South Africa won the 3-match series 2–1
Most runs	Salma Khatun (76)	Susan Benade (90)
Most wickets	Khadija Tul Kubra (5)	Dane van Niekerk (4)
- Player of the series: Susan Benade (SA)

The South Africa women's national cricket team toured Bangladesh in September 2012. They played Bangladesh in 3 One Day Internationals and 3 Twenty20 Internationals, winning both series 2–1. The series preceded South Africa's participation in the 2012 ICC Women's World Twenty20, held in Sri Lanka, for which Bangladesh had not qualified.

== Squads ==
Bangladesh	South Africa
Salma Khatun (c); Rumana Ahmed; Sharmin Akhter; Tajkia Akhter; Jahanara Alam; Champa Chakma; Fargana Hoque; Sanjida Islam; Khadija Tul Kubra; Lata Mondal; Ritu Moni; Shukhtara Rahman; Lily Rani Biswas; Tithy Sarkar; Shaila Sharmin; Nuzhat Tasnia (wk)	Mignon du Preez (c); Susan Benade; Trisha Chetty (wk); Dinesha Devnarain; Shandre Fritz; Alison Hodgkinson; Shabnim Ismail; Marizanne Kapp; Ayabonga Khaka; Marcia Letsoalo; Sunette Loubser; Suné Luus; Yolandi van der Westhuizen; Dane van Niekerk

== WODI Series ==
=== 1st ODI ===
6 September 2012
Scorecard

South Africa; 75 (34.4 overs)	v	Bangladesh; 78/8 (37.3 overs)
Mignon du Preez 24 (35); Khadija Tul Kubra 3/8 (8 overs)		Lata Mondal 31 (54); Sunette Loubser 3/32 (10 overs)

Bangladesh Women won by 2 wickets
Sher-e-Bangla National Cricket Stadium, Dhaka
Umpires: Masudur Rahman (Ban) and Sharfuddoula (Ban)
Player of the match: Lata Mondal (Ban)

- South Africa Women won the toss and elected to bat.
- Tazia Akhter (Ban), Ayabonga Khaka and Suné Luus (SA) all made their WODI debuts.

=== 2nd ODI ===
7 September 2012
Scorecard

Bangladesh; 179/7 (50 overs)	v	South Africa; 180/6 (49.2 overs)
Fargana Hoque 55 (88); Sunette Loubser 2/26 (9 overs)		Dane van Niekerk 45* (64); Jahanara Alam 3/35 (7 overs)

South Africa Women won by 4 wickets
Sher-e-Bangla National Cricket Stadium, Dhaka
Umpires: Anisur Rahman (Ban) and Mahfuzur Rahman (Ban)
Player of the match: Dane van Niekerk (SA)

- Bangladesh Women won the toss and elected to bat.

=== 3rd ODI ===
9 September 2012
Scorecard

Bangladesh; 60 (24.1 overs)	v	South Africa; 61/3 (20.4 overs)
Rumana Ahmed 16 (41); Shabnim Ismail 4/10 (5.1 overs)		Trisha Chetty 30* (60); Salma Khatun 2/20 (8.4 overs)

South Africa Women won by 7 wickets
Sher-e-Bangla National Cricket Stadium, Dhaka
Umpires: Gazi Sohel (Ban) and Tanvir Ahmed (Ban)
Player of the match: Shabnim Ismail (SA)

- Bangladesh Women won the toss and elected to bat.

== WT20I Series ==
=== 1st T20I ===
11 September 2012
Scorecard

South Africa; 105/6 (20 overs)	v	Bangladesh; 75/3 (12.1 overs)
Susan Benade 37 (30); Salma Khatun 2/21 (4 overs)		Salma Khatun 27* (14); Susan Benade 1/5 (3 overs)

Bangladesh Women won by 7 wickets (D/L)
Sher-e-Bangla National Cricket Stadium, Dhaka
Umpires: Gazi Sohel (Ban) and Sharfuddoula (Ban)
Player of the match: Salma Khatun (Ban)

- Bangladesh Women won the toss and elected to field.
- Bangladesh Women's target was 73 runs in 13 overs due to rain.
- Tazia Akhter, Tithy Sarkar (Ban), Ayabonga Khaka and Suné Luus (SA) all made their WT20I debuts.

=== 2nd T20I ===
12 September 2012
Scorecard

Bangladesh; 105/6 (20 overs)	v	South Africa; 106/4 (20 overs)
Salma Khatun 42 (42); Dane van Niekerk 2/16 (4 overs)		Susan Benade 53* (48); Jahanara Alam 3/16 (4 overs)

South Africa Women won by 6 wickets
Sher-e-Bangla National Cricket Stadium, Dhaka
Umpires: Masudur Rahman (Ban) and Tanvir Ahmed (Ban)
Player of the match: Susan Benade (SA)

- South Africa Women won the toss and elected to field.
- Lily Rani Biswas (Ban) made her WT20I debut.

=== 3rd T20I ===
14 September 2012
Scorecard

South Africa; 85 (19.5 overs)	v	Bangladesh; 69/7 (20 overs)
Mignon du Preez 50 (48); Shukhtara Rahman 3/4 (3 overs)		Fargana Hoque 23 (31); Dane van Niekerk 2/9 (4 overs)

South Africa Women won by 16 runs
Sher-e-Bangla National Cricket Stadium, Dhaka
Umpires: Anisur Rahman (Ban) and Mahfuzur Rahman (Ban)
Player of the match: Mignon du Preez (SA)

- Bangladesh Women won the toss and elected to field.
