= South Africa women's cricket team in Sri Lanka in 2014–15 =

International cricket tour

South African women's tour of Sri Lanka in 2014–15
	Sri Lanka women	South Africa women
- Dates: 15 October – 26 October
Captains	Chamari Athapaththu	Mignon du Preez

One Day International series
- Results: South Africa women won the 4-match series 2–1
Most runs	Chamari Athapaththu (229)	Marizanne Kapp (129)
Most wickets	Ama Kanchana (6)	Shabnim Ismail (11)
- Player of the series: Chamari Athapaththu (SL)

Twenty20 International series
- Results: South Africa women won the 3-match series 2–1
Most runs	Chamari Athapaththu (60)	Dane van Niekerk (107)
Most wickets	Maduri Samuddika (3)	Dane van Niekerk (4); Shabnim Ismail (4)

South African women's cricket team toured Sri Lanka in the beginning of the 2014–15 cricket season. The tour consisted of a series of 4 One day internationals and 3 Twenty20 internationals. First three of the four ODIs formed a part of the 2014–16 ICC Women's Championship.

South Africa won the first WODI and lead the series 1–0. Sri Lanka won the third WODI to help to level the series 1–1. South Africa won the fourth and final WODI and won series 2–1. South Africa won the WODI series 2–1, after the second match was abandoned due to rain. Sri Lanka won the first WT20I and lead the series 1–0. South Africa won the final two WT20I and won the series 2–1.

== Squads ==
ODIs		T20Is	
Sri Lanka	South Africa	Sri Lanka	South Africa
Chamari Athapaththu (c); Hasini Perera; Shashikala Siriwardene; Eshani Lokusuriyage; Sripali Weerakkody; Anushka Sanjeewani (wk); Maduri Samuddika; Inoka Ranaweera; Udeshika Prabodhani; Ama Kanchana; Prasadani Weerakkody; Sanduni Abeywickrema; Imalka Mendis; Nilakshi de Silva	Mignon du Preez (c); Bernadine Bezuidenhout; Trisha Chetty (wk); Moseline Daniels; Yolani Fourie; Shabnim Ismail; Marizanne Kapp; Ayabonga Khaka; Lizelle Lee; Marcia Letsoalo; Nadine Moodley; Andrie Steyn; Chloe Tryon; Dane van Niekerk	Chamari Athapaththu (c); Hasini Perera; Shashikala Siriwardene; Eshani Lokusuriyage; Sripali Weerakkody; Anushka Sanjeewani; Maduri Samuddika; Inoka Ranaweera; Udeshika Prabodhani; Ama Kanchana; Prasadani Weerakkody (wk); Sanduni Abeywickrema; Imalka Mendis; Nilakshi de Silva	Mignon du Preez (c); Bernadine Bezuidenhout; Trisha Chetty (wk); Moseline Daniels; Yolani Fourie; Shabnim Ismail; Marizanne Kapp; Ayabonga Khaka; Lizelle Lee; Marcia Letsoalo; Nadine Moodley; Andrie Steyn; Chloe Tryon; Dane van Niekerk

Chamari Polgampola, Inoshi Priyadharshani, Chandima Gunaratne and Yasoda Mendis were named as stand by player.

== ODI series ==
=== 1st ODI ===
ICC Women's Championship
15 October
09:50 SLST
(UTC+05:30)
Scorecard

South Africa; 225/8 (50 overs)	v	Sri Lanka; 172/9 (50 overs)
Marizanne Kapp 89* (90); Eshani Lokusuriyage 2/24 (8 overs)		Eshani Lokusuriyage 59 (55); Yolani Fourie 2/18 (5 overs)

South Africa Women won by 53 runs
Sinhalese Sports Club Ground, Colombo
Umpires: Ranmore Martinesz (SL) and Ruchira Palliyaguruge (SL)
Player of the match: Marizanne Kapp (SA)

- South Africa Women won the toss and elected to bat.
- Bernadine Bezuidenhout (SA), Yolani Fourie (SA), Ama Kanchana (SL) and Hasini Perera (SL) made their ODI debuts.
- ICC Women's Championship points: Sri Lanka Women 0, South Africa Women 2

=== 2nd ODI ===
ICC Women's Championship
17 October
09:50 SLST
(UTC+05:30)
Scorecard

Sri Lanka; 209/8 (50 overs)	v	South Africa
Chamari Athapaththu 106 (151); Shabnim Ismail 4/35 (9 overs)

No result
Sinhalese Sports Club Ground, Colombo
Umpires: Ranmore Martinesz (SL) and Raveendra Wimalasiri (SL)

- Sri Lanka Women won the toss and elected to bat.
- Match suspended due to rain, to be played on a reserved day (18 October).
- No play during the reserved day was possible due to rain.
- ICC Women's Championship points: Sri Lanka Women 1, South Africa Women 1

=== 3rd ODI ===
ICC Women's Championship
19 October
09:50 SLST
(UTC+05:30)
Scorecard

South Africa; 139/7 (27 overs)	v	Sri Lanka; 143/6 (26 overs)
Mignon du Preez 34 (44); Ama Kanchana 3/26 (3 overs)		Chamari Athapaththu 63 (71); Shabnim Ismail 3/34 (6 overs)

Sri Lanka Women won by 4 wickets
Sinhalese Sports Club Ground, Colombo
Umpires: Ranmore Martinesz (SL) and Ruchira Palliyaguruge (SL)
Player of the match: Chamari Athapaththu (SL)

- Sri Lanka Women won the toss and elected to field.
- Rain delayed start of play and reduced the match to 27 overs per innings.
- ICC Women's Championship points: Sri Lanka Women 2, South Africa Women 0

=== 4th ODI ===
21 October
09:50 SLST
(UTC+05:30)
Scorecard

Sri Lanka; 137 (43.4 overs)	v	South Africa; 141/5 (34.5 overs)
Eshani Lokusuriyage 46 (67); Shabnim Ismail 2/15 (7 overs)		Trisha Chetty 59 (81); Maduri Samuddika 2/28 (9 overs)

South Africa Women won by 5 wickets
Sinhalese Sports Club Ground, Colombo
Umpires: Nishan Dhanasinghe (SL) and Rohitha Kottahachchi (SL)
Player of the match: Trisha Chetty (SA)

- South Africa Women won the toss and elected to field.
- Andrie Steyn (SA) made her ODI debut.

== T20I series ==
=== 1st T20I ===
23 October
10:00 SLST
(UTC+05:30)
Scorecard

Sri Lanka; 101/7 (13 overs)	v	South Africa; 94/6 (13 overs)
Shashikala Siriwardene 28 (25); Marizanne Kapp 2/16 (3 overs)		Lizelle Lee 41 (30); Eshani Lokusuriyage 2/11 (2 overs)

Sri Lanka Women won by 7 runs
Colts Cricket Club Ground, Colombo
Umpires: Lyndon Hannibal (SL) and Rohitha Kottahachchi (SL)
Player of the match: Shashikala Siriwardene (SL)

- Sri Lanka Women won the toss and elected to bat.
- Rain delayed start of play and reduced the match to 13 overs per innings.
- Yolani Fourie (SA) and Inoshi Priyadharshani (SL) made their T20I debuts.

=== 2nd T20I ===
25 October
09:50 SLST
(UTC+05:30)
Scorecard

Sri Lanka; 76 (14 overs)	v	South Africa; 77/3 (17.3 overs)
Yasoda Mendis 21 (13); Dane van Niekerk 4/17 (4 overs)		Dane van Niekerk 22 (43); Maduri Samuddika 2/18 (4 overs)

South Africa Women won by 7 wickets
Colts Cricket Club Ground, Colombo
Umpires: Asanga Jayasooriya (SL) and Prageeth Rambukwella (SL)
Player of the match: Dane van Niekerk (SA)

- Sri Lanka Women won the toss and elected to bat.

=== 3rd T20I ===
26 October
14:00 SLST
(UTC+05:30)
Scorecard

Sri Lanka; 132/6 (20 overs)	v	South Africa; 136/1 (19.5 overs)
Prasadani Weerakkody 48 (45); Marcia Letsoalo 2/15 (4 overs)		Dane van Niekerk 70* (68); Maduri Samuddika 1/24 (4 overs)

South Africa Women won by 9 wickets
Mercantile Cricket Association Ground, Colombo
Umpires: Deepal Gunawardene (SL) and Rohitha Kottahachchi (SL)
Player of the match: Dane van Niekerk (SA)

- Sri Lanka Women won the toss and elected to bat.
