= England women's cricket team in South Africa in 2015–16 =

International cricket tour

England women's tour of South Africa
	South Africa women	England women
- Dates: 2 February – 21 February
Captains	Mignon du Preez	Charlotte Edwards

One Day International series
- Results: England women won the 3-match series 2–1
Most runs	Trisha Chetty (187)	Heather Knight (154)
Most wickets	Shabnim Ismail (5)	Anya Shrubsole (7)
- Player of the series: Heather Knight (Eng)

Twenty20 International series
- Results: England women won the 3-match series 2–1
Most runs	Dane van Niekerk (120)	Sarah Taylor (200)
Most wickets	Shabnim Ismail (5)	Anya Shrubsole (5)
- Player of the series: Sarah Taylor (Eng)

The England women's cricket team toured South Africa in February 2016. The tour consisted of a three T20Is match series and a three ODIs match series. The ODI series was part of the 2014–16 ICC Women's Championship. England won both series by 2–1.

== Squads ==
ODIs		T20Is	
South Africa	England	South Africa	England
Mignon du Preez (c); Trisha Chetty (wk); Laura Wolvaardt; Andrie Steyn; Marizanne Kapp; Dane van Niekerk; Lizelle Lee; Dinesha Devnarain; Chloe Tryon; Suné Luus; Shabnim Ismail; Masabata Klaas; Ayabonga Khaka; Marcia Letsoalo; Sinalo Jafta	Charlotte Edwards (c); ~~Katherine Brunt~~^{1}; Kate Cross; Georgia Elwiss; Lydia Greenway; Rebecca Grundy; Jenny Gunn; Danielle Hazell; Amy Jones (wk); Heather Knight; Nat Sciver; Anya Shrubsole; Sarah Taylor (wk); Lauren Winfield; Danni Wyatt	Mignon du Preez (c); Trisha Chetty (wk); Lara Goodall; Moseline Daniels; Marizanne Kapp; Dane van Niekerk; Lizelle Lee; Dinesha Devnarain; Chloe Tryon; Suné Luus; Shabnim Ismail; Masabata Klaas; Ayabonga Khaka; Marcia Letsoalo; Yolani Fourie	Charlotte Edwards (c); Tammy Beaumont (wk); ~~Katherine Brunt~~^{1}; Georgia Elwiss; Lydia Greenway; Rebecca Grundy; Jenny Gunn; Danielle Hazell; Amy Jones (wk); Heather Knight; Nat Sciver; Anya Shrubsole; Sarah Taylor (wk); Lauren Winfield; Danni Wyatt

^{1} Katherine Brunt suffered a back injury during the second ODI match and was ruled out of the tour, missing the third ODI and the entire T20I series. She was replaced by Natasha Farrant.

== Tour matches ==
2 February
10:00 SAST
(UTC+2)
Scorecard

England Women; 337/8 (50 overs)	v	SA Emerging Players; 193 (49.1 overs)
Lauren Winfield 81 (50); Michelle Burt 3/63 (10 overs)		Danni Wyatt 62 (42); Katherine Brunt 4/20 (7 overs)

England Women won by 144 runs
LC de Villiers Oval, Pretoria
Umpires: Dennis Smith (SA) and Phillip Vosloo (SA)

- England Women won the toss and elected to bat.

4 February
10:00 SAST
(UTC+2)
Scorecard

SA Emerging Players; 62 (28.2 overs)	v	England Women; 63/1 (10.1 overs)
Lauren Booysen 9 (28); Danni Wyatt 3/7 (5 overs)		Amy Jones 44* (35); Moseline Daniels 1/28 (5 overs)

England Women won by 9 wickets
Mamelodi Oval, Pretoria
Umpires: Allahudien Paleker (SA) and Dennis Smith (SA)

- SA Emerging Players Women won the toss and elected to bat.

== ODI series ==
=== 1st ODI ===
ICC Women's Championship
7 February
10:00 SAST
(UTC+2)
Scorecard

South Africa; 196 (49.2 overs)	v	England; 150/3 (28.3 overs)
Trisha Chetty 90 (122); Anya Shrubsole 4/29 (10 overs)		Sarah Taylor 41* (44); Chloe Tryon 1/17 (4 overs)

England Women won by 7 wickets (DLS method)
Willowmoore Park, Benoni
Umpires: Allahudien Paleker (SA) and Brad White (SA)
Player of the match: Anya Shrubsole (Eng)

- South Africa Women won the toss and elected to bat.
- Rain interrupted play at 13.1 overs of the second innings (England was batting at 63/2), reducing the innings to 48 overs with a revised target of 194.
- Lightning and rain interrupted play at 25 overs of the second innings (England was batting at 120/3), reducing the innings to 35 overs with a revised target of 150.
- Laura Wolvaardt (SA) made her ODI debut.
- ICC Women's Championship points: South Africa Women 0, England Women 2

=== 2nd ODI ===
ICC Women's Championship
12 February
10:00 SAST
(UTC+2)
Scorecard

England; 262/9 (50 overs)	v	South Africa; 265/5 (48.5 overs)
Heather Knight 61 (76); Shabnim Ismail 3/32 (10 overs)		Lizelle Lee 69 (56); Danielle Hazell 2/34 (10 overs)

South Africa Women won by 5 wickets
Centurion Park, Centurion
Umpires: Phillip Vosloo (SA) and Brad White (SA)
Player of the match: Lizelle Lee (SA)

- England Women won the toss and elected to bat.
- Sarah Taylor (Eng) made her 100th ODI match.
- ICC Women's Championship points: South Africa Women 2, England Women 0

=== 3rd ODI ===
ICC Women's Championship
14 February
10:00 SAST
(UTC+2)
Scorecard

South Africa; 196/9 (50 overs)	v	England; 198/5 (43.5 overs)
Lizelle Lee 74 (77); Anya Shrubsole 3/35 (10 overs)		Heather Knight 67* (100); Chloe Tryon 2/28 (8.5 overs)

England Women won by 5 wickets
New Wanderers Stadium, Johannesburg
Umpires: Dennis Smith (SA) and Phillip Vosloo (SA)
Player of the match: Heather Knight (Eng)

- England Women won the toss and elected to field.
- ICC Women's Championship points: South Africa Women 0, England Women 2

== T20I series ==
=== 1st T20I ===
18 February
13:30 SAST
(UTC+2)
Scorecard

England; 147/7 (20 overs)	v	South Africa; 132/6 (20 overs)
Sarah Taylor 74* (51); Moseline Daniels 2/20 (4 overs)		Dane van Niekerk 52 (49); Anya Shrubsole 3/25 (4 overs)

England Women won by 15 runs
Boland Park, Paarl
Umpires: Allahudien Paleker (SA) and Dennis Smith (SA)
Player of the match: Sarah Taylor (Eng)

- South Africa Women won the toss and elected to field.

=== 2nd T20I ===
19 February
13:30 SAST
(UTC+2)
Scorecard

England; 156/6 (20 overs)	v	South Africa; 145/3 (17.2 overs)
Sarah Taylor 66 (53); Suné Luus 2/26 (4 overs)		Dane van Niekerk 63 (43); Georgia Elwiss 1/15 (2 overs)

South Africa Women won by 17 runs (DLS method)
Newlands, Cape Town
Umpires: Bongani Jele (SA) and Allahudien Paleker (SA)
Player of the match: Dane van Niekerk (SA)

- South Africa Women won the toss and elected to field.
- Rain stopped play for 10 minutes after 13 overs of the second innings (South Africa was batting at 108/2), no overs were lost.
- Rain interrupted play at 17.2 overs of the second innings (South Africa was batting at 145/3) and no further play was possible. At that stage, South Africa Duckworth–Lewis–Stern method par score was 128 runs, therefore they were declared winners by 17 runs.

=== 3rd T20I ===
21 February
10:00 SAST
(UTC+2)
Scorecard

South Africa; 131/4 (20 overs)	v	England; 133/6 (15.3 overs)
Lizelle Lee 69* (61); Anya Shrubsole 2/28 (4 overs)		Sarah Taylor 60 (40); Shabnim Ismail 3/27 (3 overs)

England Women won by 4 wickets
New Wanderers Stadium, Johannesburg
Umpires: Bongani Jele (SA) and Dennis Smith (SA)
Player of the match: Sarah Taylor (Eng)

- England Women won the toss and elected to field.
- Mignon du Preez (SA) and Sarah Taylor (Eng) scored their 1,000th and 2,000th T20I runs respectively.
