= South Africa women's cricket team against Pakistan in the UAE in 2014–15 =

Women's Cricket

	Pakistan women	South Africa women
- Dates: 13 March – 22 March
Captains	Sana Mir	Mignon du Preez

One Day International series
- Results: South Africa women won the 3-match series 2–1
Most runs	Bismah Maroof (101)	Lizelle Lee (107)
Most wickets	Anam Amin (9)	Suné Luus (10)
- Player of the series: Suné Luus (SA)

Twenty20 International series
- Results: South Africa women won the 3-match series 2–1
Most runs	Bismah Maroof (83)	Dane van Niekerk (106)
Most wickets	Asmavia Iqbal (6)	Dane van Niekerk (5)
- Player of the series: Asmavia Iqbal (Pak)

The South Africa's Women's cricket team faced Pakistan at United Arab Emirates from 13 to 22 March 2015. The tour consisted of three One Day International (ODI) matches and three Twenty20 International (T20I). The ODI games were part of the 2014–16 ICC Women's Championship.

== Squads ==
ODIs		T20I	
Pakistan	South Africa	Pakistan	South Africa
Sana Mir (c); Anam Amin; Asmavia Iqbal; Bismah Maroof; Iram Javed; Javeria Khan; Kainat Imtiaz; Marina Iqbal; Nahida Khan; Nain Abidi; Nida Dar; Rabiya Shah (wk); Sadia Yousuf; Sania Khan; Sidra Ameen; Sumaiya Siddiqi	Mignon du Preez (c); Bernadine Bezuidenhout; Trisha Chetty (wk); Moseline Daniels; Yolani Fourie; Shabnim Ismail; Marizanne Kapp; Ayabonga Khaka; Masabata Klaas; Lizelle Lee; Marcia Letsoalo; Suné Luus; Nadine Moodley; Dane van Niekerk	Sana Mir (c); Anam Amin; Asmavia Iqbal; Bismah Maroof; Iram Javed; Javeria Khan; Kainat Imtiaz; Marina Iqbal; Nahida Khan; Nain Abidi; Nida Dar; Rabiya Shah (wk); Sadia Yousuf; Sania Khan; Sidra Ameen; Sumaiya Siddiqi	Mignon du Preez (c); Bernadine Bezuidenhout; Trisha Chetty (wk); Moseline Daniels; Yolani Fourie; Shabnim Ismail; Marizanne Kapp; Ayabonga Khaka; Masabata Klaas; Lizelle Lee; Marcia Letsoalo; Suné Luus; Nadine Moodley; Dane van Niekerk

== ODI series ==
=== 1st ODI ===
ICC Women's Championship
13 March
09:30
Scorecard

Pakistan; 266/6 (50 overs)	v	South Africa; 239/7 (50 overs)
Bismah Maroof 119 (129); Suné Luus 4/38 (10 overs)		Trisha Chetty 103 (112); Anam Amin 3/64 (10 overs)

Pakistan Women won by 27 runs
Sharjah Cricket Association Stadium, Sharjah
Umpires: Ahsan Raza (Pak) and Khalid Mahmood (Pak)
Player of the match: Bismah Maroof (Pak)

- Pakistan Women won the toss and elected to bat.
- ICC Women's Championship points: Pakistan Women 2, South Africa Women 0

=== 2nd ODI ===
ICC Women's Championship
15 March
09:30
Scorecard

Pakistan; 233 (48.4 overs)	v	South Africa; 234/7 (48.4 overs)
Sana Mir 85* (88); Suné Luus 5/20 (8.4 overs)		Dane van Niekerk 100* (92); Anam Amin 4/49 (10 overs)

South Africa Women won by 3 wickets
Sharjah Cricket Association Stadium, Sharjah
Umpires: Ahsan Raza (Pak) and Khalid Mahmood (Pak)
Player of the match: Suné Luus (SA)

- Pakistan Women won the toss and elected to bat.
- ICC Women's Championship points: Pakistan Women 0, South Africa Women 2

=== 3rd ODI ===
ICC Women's Championship
17 March
09:30
Scorecard

Pakistan; 293/4 (50 overs)	v	South Africa; 296/5 (48.4 overs)
Sana Mir 152 (141); Dane van Niekerk 2/78 (10 overs)		Lizelle Lee 134 (107); Anam Amin 2/71 (10 overs)

South Africa Women won by 5 wickets
Sharjah Cricket Association Stadium, Sharjah
Umpires: Ahsan Raza (Pak) and Khalid Mahmood (Pak)
Player of the match: Lizelle Lee (SA)

- Pakistan Women won the toss and elected to bat.
- ICC Women's Championship points: Pakistan Women 0, South Africa Women 2

== T20I series ==
=== 1st T20I ===
19 March
14:00
Scorecard

South Africa; 101/7 (20 overs)	v	Pakistan; 103/5 (18.3 overs)
Mignon du Preez 41 (39); Asmavia Iqbal 3/23 (4 overs)		Marina Iqbal 42 (46); Suné Luus 3/14 (4 overs)

Pakistan Women won by 5 wickets
Sharjah Cricket Association Stadium, Sharjah
Umpires: Ahsan Raza (Pak) and Khalid Mahmood (Pak)
Player of the match: Asmavia Iqbal (Pak)

- Pakistan Women won the toss and elected to field.

=== 2nd T20I ===
20 March
14:00
Scorecard

South Africa; 163/6 (20 overs)	v	Pakistan; 124/5 (20 overs)
Suné Luus 93* (58); Asmavia Iqbal 2/12 (4 overs)		Bismah Maroof 51 (46); Dane van Niekerk 1/13 (4 overs)

South Africa Women won by 39 runs
Sharjah Cricket Association Stadium, Sharjah
Umpires: Ahsan Raza (Pak) and Khalid Mahmood (Pak)
Player of the match: Suné Luus (SA)

- South Africa Women won the toss and elected to bat.

=== 3rd T20I ===
22 March
14:00
Scorecard

Pakistan; 106/7 (20 overs)	v	South Africa; 107/3 (19.5 overs)
Bismah Maroof 34 (42); Dane van Niekerk 3/12 (4 overs)		Dane van Niekerk 67 (80); Anam Amin 1/20 (4 overs)

South Africa Women won by 7 wickets
Sharjah Cricket Association Stadium, Sharjah
Umpires: Ahsan Raza (Pak) and Khalid Mahmood (Pak)
Player of the match: Dane van Niekerk (SA)

- South Africa Women won the toss and elected to field.
