= West Indies women's cricket team in South Africa in 2015–16 =

West Indies women's tour of South Africa
	South Africa women	West Indies women
- Dates: 22 February – 9 March
Captains	Mignon du Preez	Stafanie Taylor

One Day International series
- Results: West Indies women won the 3-match series 2–1
Most runs	Trisha Chetty (153)	Deandra Dottin (114)
Most wickets	Suné Luus (7)	Deandra Dottin (7)

Twenty20 International series
- Results: South Africa women won the 3-match series 2–1
Most runs	Lizelle Lee (76)	Stafanie Taylor (88)
Most wickets	Shabnim Ismail (7)	Anisa Mohammed (5)
- Player of the series: Stafanie Taylor (WI)

West Indies women's cricket team toured South Africa in February 2016. The tour consisted of a series of 3 T20Is and 3 ODIs. The ODI series were part of the 2014–16 ICC Women's Championship. The West Indies won the ODI series by 2–1 and South Africa won the T20I series also by 2–1.

== Squads ==
ODIs		T20Is	
South Africa	West Indies	South Africa	West Indies
Mignon du Preez (c); Trisha Chetty (wk); Dinesha Devnarain; Shabnim Ismail; Marizanne Kapp; Ayabonga Khaka; Odine Kirsten; Masabata Klaas; Lizelle Lee; Marcia Letsoalo; Suné Luus; Dane van Niekerk; Andrie Steyn; Chloe Tryon; Laura Wolvaardt	Stafanie Taylor (c); Shakera Selman (vc); Merissa Aguilleira (wk); Shemaine Campbelle; Shamilia Connell; Britney Cooper; Deandra Dottin; Afy Fletcher; Stacy-Ann King; Kycia Knight (wk); Kyshona Knight; Hayley Matthews; Anisa Mohammed; Shaquana Quintyne; Tremayne Smartt	Mignon du Preez (c); Trisha Chetty (wk); Moseline Daniels; Dinesha Devnarain; Yolani Fourie; Lara Goodall; Shabnim Ismail; Marizanne Kapp; Ayabonga Khaka; Masabata Klaas; Lizelle Lee; Marcia Letsoalo; Suné Luus; Dane van Niekerk; Chloe Tryon	Stafanie Taylor (c); Shakera Selman (vc); Merissa Aguilleira (wk); Shemaine Campbelle; Shamilia Connell; Britney Cooper; Deandra Dottin; Afy Fletcher; Stacy-Ann King; Kycia Knight (wk); Kyshona Knight; Hayley Matthews; Anisa Mohammed; Shaquana Quintyne; Tremayne Smartt

== Tour match ==
22 February
10:00 SAST
(UTC+2)
Scorecard

Eastern Province-Border Invitation Women	v	West Indies Women

University of Fort Hare, Alice, Eastern Cape

== ODI series ==
=== 1st ODI ===
ICC Women's Championship
24 February
10:00 SAST
(UTC+2)
Scorecard

West Indies; 214/7 (50 overs)	v	South Africa; 198 (48.5 overs)
Hayley Matthews 56 (68); Dane van Niekerk 2/25 (10 overs)		Marizanne Kapp 69* (83); Deandra Dottin 5/34 (8.5 overs)

West Indies Women won by 16 runs
Buffalo Park, East London
Umpires: Dennis Smith (SA) and Phillip Vosloo (SA)
Player of the match: Deandra Dottin (WIn)

- West Indies Women won the toss and elected to bat.
- Marizanne Kapp (SA) scored her 1,000th ODI career run.
- ICC Women's Championship points: West Indies Women 2, South Africa Women 0

=== 2nd ODI ===
ICC Women's Championship
27 February
10:00 SAST
(UTC+2)
Scorecard

West Indies; 232 (49.1 overs)	v	South Africa; 175 (45.3 overs)
Stafanie Taylor 79 (83); Suné Luus 3/34 (9 overs)		Trisha Chetty 51 (78); Hayley Matthews 2/18 (6.3 overs)

West Indies Women won by 57 runs
Buffalo Park, East London
Umpires: Allahudien Paleker (SA) and Dennis Smith (SA)
Player of the match: Stafanie Taylor (WIn)

- West Indies Women won the toss and elected to bat.
- ICC Women's Championship points: West Indies Women 2, South Africa Women 0

=== 3rd ODI ===
ICC Women's Championship
29 February
10:00 SAST
(UTC+2)
Scorecard

South Africa; 235/6 (50 overs)	v	West Indies; 200/8 (50 overs)
Dane van Niekerk 55 (48); Shaquana Quintyne 1/28 (10 overs)		Merissa Aguilleira 40 (65); Suné Luus 2/30 (8 overs)

South Africa Women won by 35 runs
Buffalo Park, East London
Umpires: Allahudien Paleker (SA) and Phillip Vosloo (SA)
Player of the match: Trisha Chetty (SA)

- South Africa Women won the toss and elected to bat.
- ICC Women's Championship points: West Indies Women 0, South Africa Women 2

== T20I series ==
=== 1st T20I ===
4 March
13:30 SAST
(UTC+2)
Scorecard

South Africa; 125/6 (20 overs)	v	West Indies; 114/6 (20 overs)
Lizelle Lee 35 (32); Anisa Mohammed 2/23 (4 overs)		Deandra Dottin 40 (31); Shabnim Ismail 3/12 (4 overs)

South Africa Women won by 11 runs
Kingsmead Cricket Ground, Durban
Umpires: Allahudien Paleker (SA) and Dennis Smith (SA)
Player of the match: Shabnim Ismail (SA)

- South Africa Women won the toss and elected to bat.
- Odine Kirsten (SA) made her T20I debut.

=== 2nd T20I ===
6 March
10:00 SAST
(UTC+2)
Scorecard

West Indies; 143/6 (20 overs)	v	South Africa; 98 (18.4 overs)
Stafanie Taylor 63 (53); Shabnim Ismail 3/25 (4 overs)		Marizanne Kapp 17 (15); Anisa Mohammed 2/12 (3.4 overs)

West Indies Women won by 45 runs
Wanderers Stadium, Johannesburg
Umpires: Allahudien Paleker (SA) and Brad White (SA)
Player of the match: Stafanie Taylor (WIn)

- South Africa Women won the toss and elected to field.
- Lara Goodall (SA) made her T20I debut.

=== 3rd T20I ===
9 March
13:30 SAST
(UTC+2)
Scorecard

South Africa; 119/3 (20 overs)	v	West Indies; 115/8 (20 overs)
Lizelle Lee 33* (23); Shamilia Connell 1/14 (3 overs)		Deandra Dottin 24 (18); Yolani Fourie 2/20 (4 overs)

South Africa Women won by 4 runs
Newlands Cricket Ground, Cape Town
Umpires: Bongani Jele (SA) and Brad White (SA)
Player of the match: Lizelle Lee (SA)

- South Africa Women won the toss and elected to bat.
