= South Africa women's cricket team in England in 2014 =

South African women's cricket team in England in 2014
| | England | South Africa |
- Dates: 29 August – 10 September 2014
| Captains | Charlotte Edwards | Mignon du Preez |

Twenty20 International series
- Results: England won the 3-match series 3–0
| Most runs | Charlotte Edwards (141) | Dane van Niekerk (105) |
| Most wickets | Jenny Gunn (5) | Dane van Niekerk (2); Moseline Daniels (2); Chloe Tryon (2) |
- Player of the series: Charlotte Edwards (Eng)

The South Africa women's national cricket team toured England in August and September 2014. They played 3 Twenty20 Internationals each against England and Ireland. The first series was won 3–0 by England, whilst the second series was won 3–0 by South Africa.

== Squads ==
| England | South Africa |
|---|---|
| Charlotte Edwards (c); Tammy Beaumont; Katherine Brunt; Tash Farrant; Lydia Greenway; Rebecca Grundy (withdrawn); Jenny Gunn; Danielle Hazell; Amy Jones; Heather Knight; Sonia Odedra; Nat Sciver; Anya Shrubsole; Sarah Taylor (wk) | Mignon du Preez (c); Bernadine Bezuidenhout; Trisha Chetty (wk); Moseline Daniels; Shabnim Ismail; Marizanne Kapp; Ayabonga Khaka; Lizelle Lee; Marcia Letsoalo; Sunette Loubser; Suné Luus; Andrie Steyn; Chloe Tryon; Dane van Niekerk |

== Tour Matches ==
=== 20-over match: England Academy v South Africa ===
29 August 2014
Scorecard

| England Academy; 139/2 (20 overs) | v | South Africa; 114/5 (20 overs) |
| Danni Wyatt 72 (54); Chloe Tryon 1/15 (3 overs) | | Trisha Chetty 52* (51); Georgia Hennessy 2/23 (4 overs) |

England Academy Women won by 25 runs
Garon Park, Southend-on-Sea
Umpires: Jon Glynn (Eng) and Paul Nicholls (Eng)

- South Africa Women won the toss and elected to field.

=== 20-over match: England Academy v South Africa ===
30 August 2014
Scorecard

| England Academy; 96/9 (20 overs) | v | South Africa; 97/5 (17.5 overs) |
| Amy Jones 27 (26); Moseline Daniels 4/5 (4 overs) | | Lizelle Lee 22 (31); Laura Marsh 2/13 (4 overs) |

South Africa Women won by 5 wickets
Garon Park, Southend-on-Sea
Umpires: Gary Marshall (Eng) and Nick Hall (Eng)

- South Africa Women won the toss and elected to field.

== WT20I Series: England v South Africa ==
=== 1st T20I ===
1 September 2014
Scorecard

| South Africa; 89/4 (20 overs) | v | England; 91/1 (13.3 overs) |
| Dane van Niekerk 36 (54); Nat Sciver 1/10 (2 overs) | | Charlotte Edwards 62* (54) |

England Women won by 9 wickets
County Ground, Chelmsford
Umpires: Jeremy Lloyds (Eng) and Neil Mallender (Eng)
Player of the match: Charlotte Edwards (Eng)

- England Women won the toss and elected to field.

=== 2nd T20I ===
3 September 2014
Scorecard

| England; 141/3 (20 overs) | v | South Africa; 99 (18.3 overs) |
| Charlotte Edwards 75* (61); Moseline Daniels 2/28 (4 overs) | | Dane van Niekerk 34 (47); Jenny Gunn 3/13 (3 overs) |

England Women won by 42 runs
County Ground, Northampton
Umpires: Jeremy Lloyds (Eng) and Neil Mallender (Eng)
Player of the match: Charlotte Edwards (Eng)

- England Women won the toss and elected to bat.

=== 3rd T20I ===
7 September 2014
Scorecard

| England; 126/6 (20 overs) | v | South Africa; 118/6 (20 overs) |
| Lauren Winfield 74 (60); Chloe Tryon 2/18 (2 overs) | | Dane van Niekerk 35 (40); Jenny Gunn 2/18 (4 overs) |

England Women won by 8 runs
Edgbaston, Birmingham
Umpires: David Millns (Eng) and Rob Bailey (Eng)
Player of the match: Lauren Winfield (Eng)

- South Africa Women won the toss and elected to field.
- Bernadine Bezuidenhout (SA) made her WT20I debut.

== WT20I Series: Ireland v South Africa ==
=== 1st T20I ===
9 September 2014
Scorecard

| South Africa; 127/5 (20 overs) | v | Ireland; 71 (18.5 overs) |
| Bernadine Bezuidenhout 34 (33); Isobel Joyce 3/16 (4 overs) | | Isobel Joyce 18 (22); Dane van Niekerk 2/8 (4 overs) |

South Africa Women won by 56 runs
Scorers, Shirley
Umpires: Ian Starkey (Eng) and Niven Roper (Eng)

- Ireland Women won the toss and elected to field.
- Andrie Steyn (SA) made her WT20I debut.

=== 2nd T20I ===
9 September 2014
Scorecard

| South Africa; 161/5 (20 overs) | v | Ireland; 115/8 (20 overs) |
| Mignon du Preez 69 (42); Laura Delany 1/21 (2 overs) | | Clare Shillington 31 (31); Suné Luus 4/21 (4 overs) |

South Africa Women won by 46 runs
Scorers, Shirley
Umpires: Ian Starkey (Eng) and Niven Roper (Eng)

- Ireland Women won the toss and elected to field.
- Gaby Lewis (Ire) made her WT20I debut.

=== 3rd T20I ===
10 September 2014
Scorecard

| Ireland; 109/8 (20 overs) | v | South Africa; 111/4 (18.5 overs) |
| Isobel Joyce 45 (48); Chloe Tryon 2/14 (3 overs) | | Mignon du Preez 37 (35); Laura Delany 1/13 (2 overs) |

South Africa Women won by 6 wickets
Scorers, Shirley
Umpires: Bill Smith (Eng) and Russell Warren (Eng)

- South Africa Women won the toss and elected to field.
