= South Africa women's cricket team in England in 2007 =

The South Africa national women's cricket team toured England in 2007, playing two Women's Twenty20 Internationals, one against England, and one against New Zealand, and two 50 over matches against the England Development Squad. The two T20Is were the first ever played by South Africa in the format.

== Twenty20 Internationals ==
=== New Zealand ===
10 August 2007
Scorecard

New Zealand; 186/7 (20 overs)	v	South Africa; 89 (17.2 overs)
Suzie Bates 62 (37); Johmari Logtenberg 2/35 (4 overs)		Cri-Zelda Brits 23 (25); Helen Watson 3/13 (3 overs)

New Zealand Women won by 97 runs
County Ground, Taunton
Umpires: Charles Puckett (Eng) and John Schofield (Eng)

- New Zealand Women won the toss and elected to bat.
- Suzie Bates, Selena Charteris, Ros Kember, Rowan Milburn (NZ), Susan Benade, Cri-Zelda Brits, Trisha Chetty, Mignon du Preez, Shabnim Ismail, Ashlyn Kilowan, Marcia Letsoalo, Johmari Logtenberg, Sunette Loubser, Alicia Smith and Claire Terblanche (SA) all made their WT20I debuts.

=== England ===
10 August 2007
Scorecard

England; 180/5 (20 overs)	v	South Africa; 94 (18 overs)
Charlotte Edwards 64 (36); Sunette Loubser 2/30 (4 overs)		Johmari Logtenberg 29 (22); Jenny Gunn 4/9 (2 overs)

England Women won by 86 runs
County Ground, Taunton
Umpires: Charles Puckett (Eng) and John Schofield (Eng)

- England Women won the toss and elected to bat.
- Holly Colvin (Eng) and Annelie Minny (SA) both made their WT20I debuts.

== Tour matches ==
7 August 2007
Scorecard

South Africa; 200/8 (50 overs)	v	England Development Squad; 164 (49 overs)

South Africa won by 36 runs
Taunton School, Taunton

8 August 2007
Scorecard

South Africa; 218/5 (50 overs)	v	England Development Squad; 155 (45.3 overs)

South Africa won by 63 runs
Taunton School, Taunton
