= South Africa women's cricket team in England in 2008 =

South African women's cricket team in England in 2008
	England	South Africa
- Dates: 31 July – 23 August 2008
Captains	Charlotte Edwards	Cri-Zelda Brits

One Day International series
- Results: England won the 5-match series 4–0
Most runs	Sarah Taylor (196)	Alicia Smith (116)
Most wickets	Holly Colvin (7)	Ashlyn Kilowan (9)

Twenty20 International series
- Results: England won the 3-match series 3–0
Most runs	Charlotte Edwards (154)	Alicia Smith (42)
Most wickets	Laura Marsh (4); Holly Colvin (4)	Susan Benade (4)
- Player of the series: Holly Colvin (Eng)

The South Africa women's national cricket team toured England in July and August 2008. They first played Ireland in 1 One Day Internationals and 1 Twenty20 International, winning both matches. They then played a 5 match ODI series and a 3 match T20I series against England, both of which were won by England.

== Squads ==
England	South Africa
Charlotte Edwards (c); Lynsey Askew; Caroline Atkins; Katherine Brunt; Holly Colvin; Lydia Greenway; Isa Guha; Jenny Gunn; Laura Marsh; Beth Morgan; Ebony Rainford-Brent; Nicky Shaw; Anya Shrubsole; Sarah Taylor (wk); Claire Taylor	Cri-Zelda Brits (c); Olivia Anderson (wk); Susan Benade; Trisha Chetty (wk); Dinesha Devnarain; Shandre Fritz; Ashlyn Kilowan; Marcia Letsoalo; Sunette Loubser; Annelie Minny (wk); Alicia Smith; Claire Terblanche; Daleen Terblanche; Charlize van der Westhuizen

== Only ODI: Ireland v South Africa ==
31 July 2008
Scorecard

Ireland; 63 (25.5 overs)	v	South Africa; 64/0 (15.1 overs)
Eimear Richardson 19 (44); Ashlyn Kilowan 3/6 (5 overs)		Trisha Chetty 45* (46)

South Africa Women won by 10 wickets
Wellington College, Crowthorne
Umpires: Harry Stent (Eng) and Richard Wheeler (Eng)

- South Africa Women won the toss and elected to field.
- Suzanne Kenealy (Ire) made her WODI debut.

== Only T20I: Ireland v South Africa ==
1 August 2008
Scorecard

South Africa; 111/5 (20 overs)	v	Ireland; 103/7 (20 overs)
Daleen Terblanche 37 (42); Marianne Herbert 3/18 (3 overs)		Nicola Coffey 26 (31); Alicia Smith 2/27 (4 overs)

South Africa Women won by 8 runs
Wellington College, Crowthorne
Umpires: Eddie Lunn (Eng) and M Magnell (Eng)

- Ireland Women won the toss and elected to field.
- Jill Whelan (Ire), Dinesha Devnarain, Daleen Terblanche and Charlize van der Westhuizen (SA) all made their WT20I debuts.

== Tour Match: England Development Squad v South Africa ==
4 August 2008
Scorecard

England Development Squad; 105/6 (20 overs)	v	South Africa; 99/9 (20 overs)
Rosalie Birch 49 (62); Shandre Fritz 3/18 (4 overs)		Olivia Anderson 22* (16); Danielle Hazell 3/9 (4 overs)

England Development Squad Women won by 6 runs
Sonning Lane, Reading
Umpires: Roger Garland (Eng) and Stephen Marszal (Eng)

- England Development Squad Women won the toss and elected to bat.

== WODI Series ==
=== 1st ODI ===
6 August 2008
Scorecard

England; 254/6 (50 overs)	v	South Africa; 133 (41.5 overs)
Claire Taylor 83 (70); Sunette Loubser 2/43 (7 overs)		Olivia Anderson 35 (76); Holly Colvin 3/17 (10 overs)

England Women won by 121 runs
St Lawrence Ground, Canterbury
Umpires: Neil Bainton (Eng) and Peter Willey (Eng)
Player of the match: Claire Taylor (Eng)

- South Africa Women won the toss and elected to field.

=== 2nd ODI ===
8 August 2008
Scorecard

England; 310/3 (50 overs)	v	South Africa; 85 (39 overs)
Caroline Atkins 145 (155); Ashlyn Kilowan 2/51 (7 overs)		Charlize van der Westhuizen 15* (76); Katherine Brunt 5/25 (10 overs)

England Women won by 225 runs
Lord's, London
Umpires: Rob Bailey (Eng) and Steve Garratt (Eng)
Player of the match: Caroline Atkins (Eng)

- England Women won the toss and elected to bat.

=== 3rd ODI ===
8 August 2008
Scorecard

England; 185 (47.3 overs)	v	South Africa; 108 (42.2 overs)
Lydia Greenway 61* (101); Charlize van der Westhuizen 4/30 (10 overs)		Alicia Smith 30 (57); Laura Marsh 4/19 (9.2 overs)

England Women won by 77 runs
Denis Compton Oval, Shenley
Umpires: Barrie Leadbeater (Eng) and Neil Mallender (Eng)
Player of the match: Lydia Greenway (Eng)

- England Women won the toss and elected to bat.

=== 4th ODI ===
14 August 2008
Scorecard

South Africa; 158 (47.3 overs)	v	England; 159/4 (45 overs)
Alicia Smith 68 (110); Lynsey Askew 2/19 (7 overs)		Charlotte Edwards 58* (106); Ashlyn Kilowan 3/19 (10 overs)

England Women won by 6 wickets
Denis Compton Oval, Shenley
Umpires: Nigel Cowley (Eng) and Peter Willey (Eng)
Player of the match: Alicia Smith (SA)

- England Women won the toss and elected to field.
- Anya Shrubsole (Eng) made her WODI debut.

=== 5th ODI ===
18 August 2008
Scorecard

England	v	South Africa

Match Abandoned
Queen's Park, Chesterfield
Umpires: Nigel Llong (Eng) and Peter Hartley (Eng)

- No toss.
- No play possible due to rain.

== WT20I Series ==
=== 1st T20I ===
22 August 2008
Scorecard

England; 138/6 (20 overs)	v	South Africa; 84/4 (20 overs)
Charlotte Edwards 45 (34); Susan Benade 2/21 (4 overs)		Susan Benade 34* (41); Katherine Brunt 2/12 (4 overs)

England Women won by 54 runs
County Ground, Northampton
Umpires: Martin Bodenham (Eng) and Nick Cook (Eng)
Player of the match: Charlotte Edwards (Eng)

- South Africa Women won the toss and elected to field.
- Ebony Rainford-Brent (Eng), Olivia Anderson and Shandre Fritz (SA) all made their WT20I debuts.

=== 2nd T20I ===
23 August 2008
Scorecard

England; 116/8 (20 overs)	v	South Africa; 79/7 (20 overs)
Charlotte Edwards 76* (66); Ashlyn Kilowan 3/25 (4 overs)		Trisha Chetty 15 (17); Laura Marsh 2/14 (4 overs)

England Women won by 37 runs
County Ground, Northampton
Umpires: Martin Bodenham (Eng) and Nick Cook (Eng)
Player of the match: Charlotte Edwards (Eng)

- England Women won the toss and elected to bat.

=== 3rd T20I ===
23 August 2008
Scorecard

England; 123/5 (20 overs)	v	South Africa; 80/9 (20 overs)
Charlotte Edwards 33* (22); Shandre Fritz 1/12 (2 overs)		Ashlyn Kilowan 22 (28); Anya Shrubsole 3/19 (4 overs)

England Women won by 43 runs
County Ground, Northampton
Umpires: Martin Bodenham (Eng) and Nick Cook (Eng)
Player of the match: Anya Shrubsole (Eng)

- England Women won the toss and elected to bat.
- Anya Shrubsole (Eng) made her WT20I debut.
