= England women's cricket team in South Africa in 2004–05 =

English women's cricket team in South Africa in 2004–05
	South Africa	England
- Dates: 13 March 2005 – 20 March 2005
Captains	Alison Hodgkinson	Clare Connor

One Day International series
- Results: England won the 2-match series 2–0
Most runs	Johmari Logtenberg 80	Claire Taylor 141
Most wickets	Cri-Zelda Brits 3 Alicia Smith 3	Beth Morgan 3 Lucy Pearson 3 Rosalie Birch 3

The England women's cricket team toured South Africa in 2004–05, playing two women's One Day Internationals prior to the 2005 Women's Cricket World Cup.

== WODI series ==
=== 1st ODI ===
13 March 2005
Scorecard

South Africa; 182/7 (50 overs)	v	England; 184/3 (45.1 overs)
Charlize van der Westhuizen 25* (40); Rosalie Birch 3/29 (10 overs)		Claire Taylor 94 (129); Alicia Smith 2/30 (10 overs)

England won by 7 wickets
Manzil Park, Klerksdorp
Umpires: Duma Ntuli and Brad White

- England won the toss and elected to field.

=== 2nd ODI ===
15 March 2005
Scorecard

England; 300/4 (50 overs)	v	South Africa; 120/7 (22 overs)
Clare Connor 85* (71); Cri-Zelda Brits 2/70 (10 overs)		Johmari Logtenberg 55 (62); Beth Morgan 3/19 (2 overs)

England won by 49 runs (D/L method)
Sedgars Park, Potchefstroom
Umpires: Dennis Smith and Brad White

- South Africa won the toss and elected to field.
- After 0.5 overs of the second innings the players left the field due to rain. Revised total was 231 runs off 32 overs.
  After 8 overs of the second innings the players left the field due to rain. Revised total was 170 runs off 22 overs.

== Tour matches ==
=== 50-over tour match: England Women v Gauteng and North West Women ===
18 March 2005
Scorecard

England; 414/3 (50 overs)	v	Gauteng and North West Women; 46 (22.4 overs)
Claire Taylor 166* (102); M Vos 1/30 (4 overs)		E du Toit 15 (44); Katherine Brunt 3/10 (6 overs)

England won by 368 runs
Sedgars Park, Potchefstroom
Umpires: Raymond Bartie and T Mothlhabane

- England won the toss and elected to bat.

=== 50-over tour match: England Women v Boland and Western Province Women ===
20 March 2005

England	v	Boland and Western Province Women

Scorecard unavailable
Gert Van Rensburg Stadium, Fochville
