= Elriesa Theunissen-Fourie =

South African cricketer (1993–2019)

Personal information
- Full name: Elriesa Theunissen-Fourie
- Born: 2 May 1993; Klerksdorp, South Africa
- Died: 5 April 2019 (aged 25); Stilfontein, South Africa
- Batting: Right-handed
- Bowling: Right arm medium
- Role: All-rounder

International information
- National side: South Africa (2013)
- ODI debut (cap 66): 13 February 2013 v Sri Lanka
- Last ODI: 24 September 2013 v Bangladesh
- Only T20I (cap 32): 19 January 2013 v West Indies

Domestic team information
- Years: Team
- 2008/09–2017/18: North West

Career statistics
Competition	WODI	WT20I	WLA	WT20
Matches	3	1	67	21
Runs scored	1	0	1,220	394
Batting average	1.00	–	23.92	30.31
100s/50s	0/0	0/0	0/6	0/1
Top score	1	0*	94	94
Balls bowled	48	–	2,469	415
Wickets	2	–	86	21
Bowling average	14.00	–	16.21	17.95
5 wickets in innings	0	–	2	0
10 wickets in match	0	–	0	0
Best bowling	2/28	–	5/14	4/13
Catches/stumpings	3/–	0/–	22/–	8/–
- Source: CricketArchive, 27 February 2022

Elriesa Theunissen-Fourie (née Theunissen; 2 May 1993 – 5 April 2019) was a South African cricketer who played as a right-handed batter and right-arm medium bowler. She appeared in three One Day Internationals and one Twenty20 International for South Africa women's national cricket team in 2013. She played domestic cricket for North West.

She was killed in a road accident in April 2019, in which her child was also killed.
