= Maduri Samuddika =

Sri Lankan cricketer (born 1984)

Personal information
- Full name: Hewanam Arachchige Maduri Samuddika
- Born: 8 November 1984 (age 42); Colombo, Sri Lanka
- Batting: Right-handed
- Bowling: Right arm off spin

International information
- National side: Sri Lanka
- ODI debut (cap 49): 29 April 2011 v Ireland
- Last ODI: 10 November 2015 v New Zealand
- T20I debut (cap 26): 7 May 2012 v West Indies
- Last T20I: 22 November 2015 v New Zealand
Medal record
Representing Sri Lanka
Women's Cricket
Asian Games
Bronze medal – third place	2014 Incheon	Team
- Source: Cricinfo, 9 April 2014

Hewanam Arachchige Maduri Samuddika (born 8 November 1984), known as Maduri Samuddika, is a Sri Lankan cricketer. She made her debut in the WODI against Ireland and in WT20I against the West Indies, in April 2011 and May 2012, respectively.
