= South Africa women's cricket team in Bangladesh in 2015–16 =

South Africa women's tour of Bangladesh
	Bangladesh women	South Africa women
- Dates: 6 November – 16 November

One Day International series

Twenty20 International series

South African women were scheduled to tour Bangladesh in the second half of October. The tour consisted of three ODIs and five T20Is. On 5 October 2015, ten days prior to the supposed team's arrival in Bangladesh and four days after the men's Australian tour of Bangladesh was postponed, CSA decided to postpone the tour on grounds of security. On 15 October, a new schedule for the tour was sent by BCB to CSA and BCB announced the tour will take place in November consisting of three ODIs and four T20Is. However, on 2 November, one day before the team's new scheduled arrival in Bangladesh, it was reported the team would not arrive. A day later (3 November), CSA confirmed it was postponing the series over "personal security concerns".

As of 16 November (scheduled day of the last match from the tour) none of the matches has taken place. There has been no official statement from neither BCB nor CSA about new dates or rescheduling of the series.

== WODI series ==
=== 1st WODI ===
6 November
09:00

Bangladesh	v	South Africa

Sheikh Kamal International Cricket Stadium, Cox's Bazar

=== 2nd WODI ===
8 November
09:00

Bangladesh	v	South Africa

Sheikh Kamal International Cricket Stadium, Cox's Bazar

=== 3rd WODI ===
10 November
09:00

Bangladesh	v	South Africa

Sheikh Kamal International Cricket Stadium, Cox's Bazar

== WT20I series ==
=== 1st WT20I ===
12 November
09:00

Bangladesh	v	South Africa

Sheikh Kamal International Cricket Stadium, Cox's Bazar

=== 2nd WT20I ===
13 November
09:00

Bangladesh	v	South Africa

Sheikh Kamal International Cricket Stadium, Cox's Bazar

=== 3rd WT20I ===
15 November
09:00

Bangladesh	v	South Africa

Sheikh Kamal International Cricket Stadium, Cox's Bazar

=== 4th WT20I ===
16 November
09:00

Bangladesh	v	South Africa

Sheikh Kamal International Cricket Stadium, Cox's Bazar
