= Charlize van der Westhuizen =

South African cricketer (born 1984)

Personal information
- Full name: Charlize van der Westhuizen
- Born: 17 February 1984 (age 42); Pretoria, South Africa
- Batting: Right-handed
- Bowling: Slow left-arm orthodox
- Role: All-rounder

International information
- National side: South Africa (2003–2010)
- Test debut (cap 41): 7 August 2003 v England
- Last Test: 20 August 2003 v England
- ODI debut (cap 38): 13 August 2003 v England
- Last ODI: 23 October 2003 v West Indies
- T20I debut (cap 15): 1 August 2008 v Ireland
- Last T20I: 9 May 2010 v England

Domestic team information
- Years: Team
- 2003/04–2010/11: Northerns

Career statistics
| Competition | WTest | WODI | WT20I | WLA |
|---|---|---|---|---|
| Matches | 2 | 33 | 12 | 74 |
| Runs scored | 159 | 165 | 37 | 935 |
| Batting average | 39.75 | 10.31 | 7.40 | 19.08 |
| 100s/50s | 0/1 | 0/0 | 0/0 | 0/3 |
| Top score | 83 | 25* | 14* | 90 |
| Balls bowled | 240 | 1,519 | 271 | 3,629 |
| Wickets | 3 | 26 | 10 | 105 |
| Bowling average | 38.66 | 31.30 | 26.80 | 15.55 |
| 5 wickets in innings | 0 | 0 | 0 | 3 |
| 10 wickets in match | 0 | 0 | 0 | 0 |
| Best bowling | 2/49 | 4/30 | 2/27 | 7/17 |
| Catches/stumpings | 0/– | 7/– | 4/– | 21/– |
- Source: CricketArchive, 26 February 2022

Charlize van der Westhuizen (born 17 February 1984) is a South African former cricketer who played as a right-handed batter and slow left-arm orthodox bowler. She appeared in two Test matches, 33 One Day Internationals and 12 Twenty20 Internationals for South Africa between 2003 and 2010. She played domestic cricket for Northerns.
