= Lily Rani Biswas =

Bangladeshi cricketer (born 1989)

Personal information
- Full name: Lily Rani Biswas
- Born: 5 December 1989 (age 36); Gopalgonj, Bangladesh
- Batting: Right-handed
- Bowling: Right-arm medium
- Role: Bowler

International information
- National side: Bangladesh (2012–2013)
- T20I debut (cap 14): 12 September 2012 v South Africa
- Last T20I: 14 September 2013 v South Africa

Domestic team information
- Years: Team
- 2008/09–2009/10: Dhaka Division
- 2010/11: Barisal Division
- 2012/13–2017/18: Dhaka Division

Career statistics
Competition	WT20I	WLA	WT20
Matches	4	13	10
Runs scored	0	9	15
Batting average	0.00	1.28	5.00
100s/50s	0/0	0/0	0/0
Top score	0*	3	11
Balls bowled	48	597	157
Wickets	2	18	5
Bowling average	24.50	14.55	27.80
5 wickets in innings	0	0	0
10 wickets in match	0	0	0
Best bowling	2/18	4/32	2/18
Catches/stumpings	0/–	4/–	0/–
- Source: CricketArchive, 16 April 2022

Lily Rani Biswas (Bengali: লিলি রানী বিশ্বাস; born 5 December 1989) is a Bangladeshi former cricketer who played as a right-arm medium bowler. She appeared in four Twenty20 Internationals for Bangladesh during a little over a year in 2012–2013 and played domestic cricket for Dhaka Division and Barisal Division.

In June 2018, she was part of Bangladesh's squad that won their first ever Women's Asia Cup title, although she did not play a match. Later that same month, she was named in Bangladesh's squad for the 2018 ICC Women's World Twenty20 Qualifier tournament.
