= Alexis le Breton =

South African cricketer (born 1985)

Personal information
- Full name: Alexis le Breton
- Born: 14 August 1985 (age 41); Cape Town, South Africa
- Batting: Right-handed
- Bowling: Right arm medium
- Role: Batter

International information
- National side: South Africa (2013)
- ODI debut (cap 68): 20 September 2013 v Bangladesh
- Last ODI: 28 October 2013 v Sri Lanka
- ODI shirt no.: 23
- T20I debut (cap 34): 12 September 2013 v Bangladesh
- Last T20I: 2 November 2013 v Sri Lanka

Domestic team information
- Years: Team
- 2003/04–2021/22: Western Province

Career statistics
| Competition | WODI | WT20I |
|---|---|---|
| Matches | 6 | 5 |
| Runs scored | 4 | 24 |
| Batting average | 4.00 | 12.00 |
| 100s/50s | 0/0 | 0/0 |
| Top score | 3* | 14 |
| Catches/stumpings | 2/– | 0/– |
- Source: CricketArchive, 25 October 2023

Alexis le Breton (born 14 August 1985) is a South African former cricketer who played as a right-handed batter. She appeared in six One Day Internationals and five Twenty20 Internationals for South Africa in 2013. She played domestic cricket for Western Province.
