= Ashlyn Kilowan =

South African cricketer (born 1982)

Personal information
- Full name: Ashlyn Petro Carlyle Kilowan
- Born: 19 December 1982 (age 43); Paarl, Cape Province, South Africa
- Batting: Left-handed
- Bowling: Left-arm medium
- Role: Bowler

International information
- National side: South Africa (2003–2009)
- Only Test (cap 46): 28 July 2007 v South Africa
- ODI debut (cap 39): 16 August 2003 v England
- Last ODI: 16 October 2009 v West Indies
- T20I debut (cap 6): 10 August 2007 v New Zealand
- Last T20I: 28 October 2009 v West Indies

Domestic team information
- Years: Team
- 2003/04: Boland
- 2004/05–2010/11: Western Province
- 2012/13–2014/15: Boland

Career statistics
| Competition | WTest | WODI | WT20I | WLA |
|---|---|---|---|---|
| Matches | 1 | 32 | 11 | 146 |
| Runs scored | 28 | 124 | 33 | 1,438 |
| Batting average | – | 10.33 | 8.25 | 21.78 |
| 100s/50s | 0/0 | 0/0 | 0/0 | 1/3 |
| Top score | 28* | 21 | 22 | 116 |
| Balls bowled | 66 | 1,347 | 218 | 6,309 |
| Wickets | 0 | 33 | 10 | 191 |
| Bowling average | – | 23.57 | 23.60 | 14.59 |
| 5 wickets in innings | 0 | 0 | 0 | 5 |
| 10 wickets in match | 0 | 0 | 0 | 0 |
| Best bowling | – | 4/23 | 3/20 | 6/10 |
| Catches/stumpings | 0/– | 7/– | 3/– | 42/– |
- Source: CricketArchive, 18 February 2022

Ashlyn Petro Carlyle Kilowan (born 19 December 1982) is a South African former cricketer who played as a left-arm medium bowler. She appeared in one Test matcs, 32 One Day Internationals and 11 Twenty20 Internationals for South Africa between 2003 and 2009. She played domestic cricket for Boland and Western Province.
