= Shaila Sharmin =

Bangladeshi cricketer (born 1989)

Personal information
- Full name: Shaila Sharmin
- Born: 16 July 1989 (age 37); Khulna, Bangladesh
- Batting: Right-handed
- Bowling: Right-arm off break
- Role: All-rounder

International information
- National side: Bangladesh
- ODI debut (cap 20): 20 September 2013 v South Africa
- Last ODI: 19 February 2017 v Sri Lanka
- T20I debut (cap 21): 15 February 2013 v South Africa
- Last T20I: 7 September 2019 v Thailand

Domestic team information
- Years: Team
- 2008/09–2012/13: Khulna Division
- 2016–2016/17: Colts Cricket Club
- 2017: Sylhet Division

Career statistics
Competition	WODI	WT20I	WLA	WT20
Matches	9	16	41	23
Runs scored	81	79	640	119
Batting average	13.50	8.77	20.64	7.93
100s/50s	0/0	0/0	0/2	0/0
Top score	22	25*	63	25*
Balls bowled	90	78	1,254	180
Wickets	1	3	43	8
Bowling average	79.00	21.00	15.72	17.62
5 wickets in innings	0	0	0	0
10 wickets in match	0	0	0	0
Best bowling	1/11	2/9	4/17	2/9
Catches/stumpings	4/–	4/–	12/–	6/–
Medal record
Representing Bangladesh
Women's Cricket
Asian Games
Silver medal – second place	2014 Incheon	Team
- Source: CricketArchive, 11 April 2022

Shaila Sharmin (Bengali: শায়লা শারমিন; born 16 July 1989) is a Bangladeshi cricketer who plays as a right-arm off break bowler and right-handed batter. She appeared in 9 One Day Internationals and 16 Twenty20 Internationals for Bangladesh between 2013 and 2019. She has played domestic cricket for Khulna Division and Sylhet Division in Bangladesh and Colts Cricket Club in Sri Lanka.
