= Nadine Moodley =

South African cricketer (born 1990)

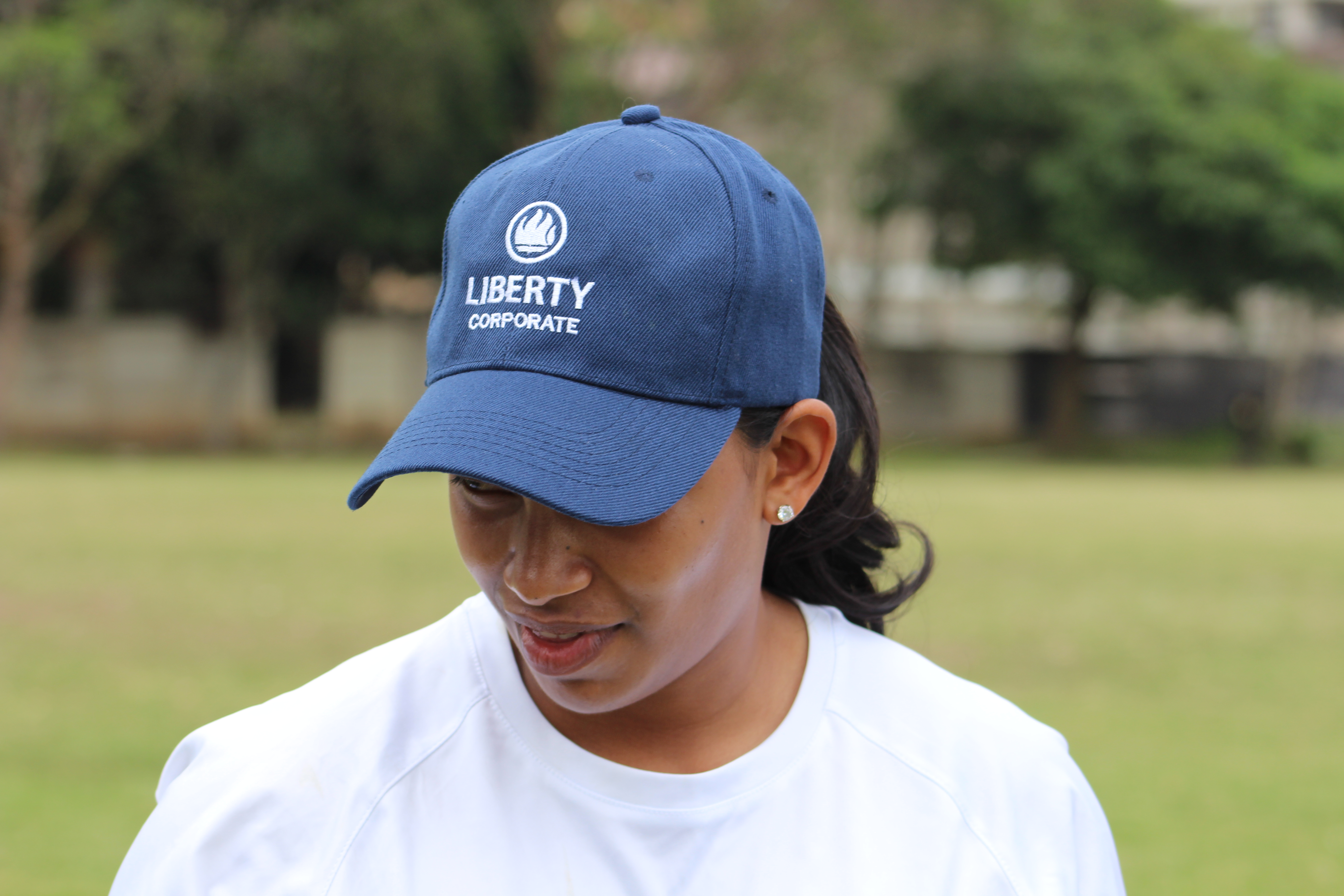
- Moodley in 2017

Personal information
- Full name: Nadine Avril Moodley
- Born: 9 April 1990 (age 36); Durban, South Africa
- Batting: Right-handed
- Bowling: Right-arm medium
- Role: Batter

International information
- National side: South Africa (2013–2015)
- Only Test (cap 54): 16 November 2014 v India
- ODI debut (cap 69): 28 October 2013 v Sri Lanka
- Last ODI: 17 March 2015 v Pakistan
- ODI shirt no.: 49
- T20I debut (cap 36): 22 January 2014 v Pakistan
- Last T20I: 22 March 2015 v Pakistan

Domestic team information
- Years: Team
- 2005/06–2009/10: KwaZulu-Natal
- 2010/11–2011/12: Western Province
- 2012/13–2021/22: KwaZulu-Natal Coastal

Career statistics
Competition	WTest	WODI	WT20I
Matches	1	9	9
Runs scored	49	80	30
Batting average	24.50	10.00	7.50
100s/50s	0/0	0/1	0/0
Top score	40	54	17
Catches/stumpings	0/–	0/–	0/–
- Source: Cricinfo, 16 February 2021

Nadine Avril Moodley (born 9 April 1990) is a South African cricketer who plays as a right-handed batter. She appeared in one Test match, nine One Day Internationals and nine Twenty20 Internationals for South Africa between 2013 and 2015. She has played domestic cricket for KwaZulu-Natal Coastal and Western Province.
