= Alicia Smith (cricketer) =

South African cricketer (born 1984)

Personal information
- Full name: Alicia Ester Smith
- Born: 13 March 1983 (age 43); Cape Town, South Africa
- Batting: Right-handed
- Bowling: Right arm medium
- Role: All-rounder

International information
- National side: South Africa (2003–2010)
- Test debut (cap 40): 7 August 2003 v England
- Last Test: 28 July 2007 v Netherlands
- ODI debut (cap 36): 13 August 2003 v England
- Last ODI: 23 October 2009 v West Indies
- T20I debut (cap 10): 10 August 2007 v New Zealand
- Last T20I: 9 May 2010 v England

Domestic team information
- Years: Team
- 2003/04–2018/19: Boland

Career statistics
Competition	WTest	WODI	WT20I	WLA
Matches	3	37	14	185
Runs scored	86	557	156	4,467
Batting average	28.66	20.62	15.60	35.17
100s/50s	0/0	0/1	0/0	5/21
Top score	24*	68	44	177
Balls bowled	336	1,699	156	8,412
Wickets	4	50	7	259
Bowling average	34.00	21.18	26.00	15.64
5 wickets in innings	0	1	0	3
10 wickets in match	0	0	0	0
Best bowling	2/4	5/7	2/23	7/15
Catches/stumpings	1/–	6/–	8/–	60/–
- Source: CricketArchive, 19 February 2021

Alicia Ester Smith (born 13 March 1984) is a South African former cricketer who played as a right-handed batter and right-arm medium bowler. She appeared in three Test matches, 37 One Day Internationals and 14 Twenty20 Internationals for South Africa between 2003 and 2010. She played domestic cricket for Boland.
