= Dennis Smith (South African cricketer) =

South African cricketer (born 1971)

Personal information
- Full name: Dennis James Smith
- Born: 26 November 1971 (age 54); Durban, South Africa
- Batting: Right-handed
- Role: Wicketkeeper, umpire

Domestic team information
- Years: Team
- 1993–1999: Northerns
- 1999–2000: Easterns
- First-class debut: 24 November 1993 Northern Transvaal B v Orange Free State B
- Last First-class: 7 January 2000 Easterns v North West
- List A debut: 13 December 1995 Northern Transvaal v Border
- Last List A: 8 March 2000 Easterns v Boland

Umpiring information
- WODIs umpired: 9 (2005–2016)
- WT20Is umpired: 5 (2013–2016)
- FC umpired: 131 (2004–present)
- LA umpired: 95 (2004–present)
- T20 umpired: 76 (2006–present)

Career statistics
Competition	FC	LA
Matches	28	36
Runs scored	907	371
Batting average	22.12	16.13
100s/50s	0/5	0/1
Top score	88*	75
Catches/stumpings	56/5	36/3
- Source: CricketArchive (subscription required), 16 August 2019

Dennis Smith (born 26 November 1971) is a South African former first-class cricketer. He is now an umpire and has stood in matches in the Sunfoil Series in South Africa and the Ranji Trophy in India. He is part of Cricket South Africa's umpire panel for first-class matches.
