= Yolani Fourie =

South African cricketer (born 1989)

Personal information
- Full name: Yolani Fourie
- Born: 12 October 1989 (age 37); Cape Town, South Africa
- Batting: Right-handed
- Bowling: Right-arm off break
- Role: Bowler

International information
- National side: South Africa (2014–2018)
- Only Test (cap 51): 16 November 2014 v India
- ODI debut (cap 71): 15 October 2014 v Sri Lanka
- Last ODI: 15 February 2017 v India
- T20I debut (cap 39): 23 October 2014 v Sri Lanka
- Last T20I: 28 March 2016 v Sri Lanka

Domestic team information
- Years: Team
- 2007/08–2013/14: Western Province
- 2014/15–2022/23: Central Gauteng

Career statistics
Competition	WTest	WODI	WT20I	WLA
Matches	1	15	10	125
Runs scored	0	43	11	658
Batting average	0.00	8.60	11.00	10.44
100s/50s	0/0	0/0	0/0	0/0
Top score	0	16*	7*	43
Balls bowled	108	486	120	4,869
Wickets	1	12	3	168
Bowling average	79.00	28.75	44.66	14.97
5 wickets in innings	0	0	0	3
10 wickets in match	0	0	0	0
Best bowling	1/79	3/20	2/20	7/23
Catches/stumpings	0/–	3/–	1/–	29/–
- Source: CricketArchive, 15 February 2024

Yolani Fourie (born 12 October 1989) is a South African cricketer. She plays as a right-arm off break bowler. She appeared in one Test match, 15 One Day Internationals and 10 Twenty20 Internationals for South Africa between 2014 and 2018. In November 2018, she was added to South Africa's squad for the 2018 ICC Women's World Twenty20 tournament in the West Indies.

In September 2019, she was named in the F van der Merwe XI squad for the inaugural edition of the Women's T20 Super League in South Africa.
