= Sunette Loubser =

South African cricketer

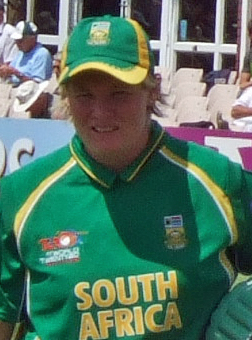
- Loubser in 2009

Personal information
- Full name: Sunette Loubser
- Born: 26 September 1982 (age 44); Paarl, Cape Province, South Africa
- Batting: Right-handed
- Bowling: Right-arm off break
- Role: Bowler

International information
- National side: South Africa (2007–2014)
- Test debut (cap 48): 28 July 2007 v Netherlands
- Last Test: 16 November 2014 v India
- ODI debut (cap 47): 20 January 2007 v Pakistan
- Last ODI: 28 November 2014 v India
- ODI shirt no.: 3
- T20I debut (cap 9): 10 August 2007 v New Zealand
- Last T20I: 30 November 2014 v India

Domestic team information
- Years: Team
- 2003/04–2016/17: Boland

Career statistics
Competition	WTest	WODI	WT20I	WLA
Matches	2	60	43	168
Runs scored	8	306	127	2,128
Batting average	4.00	12.75	7.47	23.38
100s/50s	0/0	0/0	0/0	3/8
Top score	5	27	37*	123
Balls bowled	523	2,724	814	8,319
Wickets	11	80	31	284
Bowling average	13.54	17.40	26.80	12.46
5 wickets in innings	1	1	0	5
10 wickets in match	0	0	0	0
Best bowling	5/37	5/27	3/22	6/3
Catches/stumpings	1/–	23/–	10/–	95/–
- Source: CricketArchive, 18 February 2022

Sunette Loubser (born 26 September 1982) is a South African former cricketer who played primarily as a right-arm off break bowler. She appeared in two Test matches, 60 One Day Internationals (ODIs) and 43 Twenty20 Internationals (T20Is) for South Africa between 2007 and 2014, including captaining the side in 2009. At the time of her retirement she was South Africa's leading wicket-taker in ODIs. She played domestic cricket for Boland.

== Early life and career ==
Loubser first played cricket aged seven, alongside boys in the garden. She later joined a cricket club, and made her debut for Boland at the age of 15. Originally, she opened the bowling, but after breaking her ankle in 2000, she changed style to become an off spinner. She took on the captaincy of Boland in 2005. Two years later, she made her international cricket debut when she was selected to play in an ODI against Pakistan. She bowled ten overs without claiming a wicket, but her figures of nought for 16 were the most economical of the match. Later that year, she made her first Test appearance, and helped South Africa to their first win in the format. She took five wickets in the first innings, and a further three in the second, as South Africa beat the Netherlands by 159 runs. The following year, Loubser took six wickets and conceded just three runs during the opening match of the 2008 Women's Cricket World Cup Qualifier, against Bermuda. In the match, which did not have ODI status, Bermuda were bowled out for 13 runs, which South Africa chased down in less than one over. Loubser was the leading wicket-taker of the tournament, which South Africa won.

== National captaincy ==
In 2009, Loubser replaced Cri-Zelda Brits as the captain of the South African team, when the selectors opted to let Brits focus on her batting for the 2009 Women's Cricket World Cup. The convenor of selectors, Denise Reid, said that Loubser was "a suitable and capable replacement." During the World Cup, South Africa lost all three of their matches, and were eliminated in the group stage, though they then won the seventh place play-off. Loubser had an unsuccessful tournament, bowling over 20 overs without claiming a wicket. She retained the captaincy for the subsequent 2009 ICC Women's World Twenty20. South Africa were once again eliminated from the competition in the group stage, though Loubser did claim three wickets, albeit with an economy in excess of seven. Leading South Africa in their subsequent series against the West Indies, Loubser targeted a clean sweep, aiming to "make up for our poor record." The teams split the series: South Africa won the ODIs 2–1 with one match tied, while the West Indies won all three of the T20Is.
