= Suné Luus =

South African cricketer (born 1996)

Personal information
- Full name: Suné Elbie Luus
- Born: 5 January 1996 (age 30); Pretoria, South Africa
- Batting: Right-handed
- Bowling: Right-arm leg break/off break
- Role: Bowling all-rounder

International information
- National side: South Africa (2012–present)
- Test debut (cap 62): 27 June 2022 v England
- Last Test: 28 June 2024 v India
- ODI debut (cap 63): 6 September 2012 v Bangladesh
- Last ODI: 25 February 2026 v South Africa
- ODI shirt no.: 96
- T20I debut (cap 30): 11 September 2012 v Bangladesh
- Last T20I: 30 November 2024 v England
- T20I shirt no.: 96

Domestic team information
- Years: Team
- 2009/10–present: Northerns
- 2017: Yorkshire Diamonds
- 2018/19: Brisbane Heat
- 2019: Lancashire Thunder
- 2020: Velocity
- 2022: Supernovas
- 2022: Trinbago Knight Riders

Career statistics
Competition	WTest	WODI	WT20I
Matches	3	124	128
Runs scored	242	2,265	1,395
Batting average	40.33	25.16	21.13
100s/50s	1/1	1/14	0/5
Top score	109	107*	71
Balls bowled	78	3,337	1,214
Wickets	0	115	52
Bowling average	–	21.73	23.34
5 wickets in innings	–	5	2
10 wickets in match	–	0	0
Best bowling	–	6/36	5/8
Catches/stumpings	1/–	50/–	43/–
Medal record
Women's cricket
Representing South Africa
ICC Cricket World Cup
Runner-up	2025 India
ICC T20 World Cup
Runner-up	2023 South Africa
Runner-up	2024 UAE
- Source: ESPNcricinfo, 8 December 2024

Suné Elbie Luus (/suˈneɪ ˈluːs/ soo-NAY LOOS, Afrikaans pronunciation: [suˈnɛi_ˈluːs]; born 5 January 1996) is a South African professional cricketer, who plays for the national cricket team as a spin bowling all-rounder.

== Early life and education ==
Luus was born and raised in Pretoria. Even when she was a toddler, her father encouraged her to play cricket. "My dad was a mini cricket coach – I'm still a daddy's girl!" At the age of four, she started playing mini cricket with her father and older brother.

Three years later, aged seven, Luus joined the Under-10 boys team of her primary school, Laerskool Voorpos. Initially a "keeper / allrounder / opening pace bowler", she enjoyed the challenge of proving that girls could play cricket with the boys. The same year, she also started playing women's club cricket, and was selected for the Northerns Under-13 provincial team. As a 12 year old, she was added to the Under-19 provincial team, and by the following year she was playing for the senior provincial team.

In 2009, aged 13, Luus was selected for the Under-19 national team. In both 2010 and 2011, she captained the Under-19 team that won the national championship undefeated. She also started secondary school at Hoërskool Menlopark, and became the opening batter of the school's Under-14A boys team. Later, she played for the Under-15A team, in which she competed against boys who had already played provincial cricket at the Under-15 level.

Meanwhile, Luus was also playing competitive tennis. Eventually, she had to choose between an overseas cricket tour and a Sun City tennis tour. She chose cricket, because she did not think that tennis was ever going to take her overseas. Although her mother had enjoyed travelling with her on tennis tours, both of her parents supported her decision, and watched all of the cricket matches she played.

In September 2012, at the age of 16, Luus made her debut for the national team. By then, she had become acquainted with men's Test batsman Jacques Rudolph, and he had convinced her to take up leg spin bowling.

In 2014, her final school year, Luus was so busy playing cricket that she spent only about three months attending school. At the end of that year, she considered studying teaching, but was concerned about whether she would have the time to do so.

Then, at a national team gathering at the High Performance Centre at the University of Pretoria, Luus was informed that she could study for a Higher Certificate in Sports Science over two years instead of the usual year. With the assistance of a bursary from the South African Cricketers' Association, Luus began that course in 2015. However, the university was later unable to arrange the practical element of the course for her, and she therefore transferred to the University of South Africa (Unisa) to study communication science.

== Career ==
On 5 August 2016, during a match against Ireland at the Anglesea Road Cricket Ground, she became the second player to score a half-century and take a five-for in a women's ODI, after Heather Knight, by scoring 52 runs and taking 6 wickets.

She also equalled the record of Anisa Mohammed for picking up the most wickets in a single calendar year in women's ODI cricket, with 37 dismissals in 2016. In 2016, along with Chloe Tryon, she set the record for the highest sixth-wicket partnership in a WODI, with 142 runs.

In May 2017, she was named Women's Cricketer of the Year at Cricket South Africa's annual awards. In March 2018, she was one of 14 players to be awarded a national contract by Cricket South Africa ahead of the 2018–19 season. In October 2018, she was named in South Africa's squad for the 2018 ICC Women's World Twenty20 tournament in the West Indies.

In November 2018, she was named in Brisbane Heat's squad for the 2018–19 Women's Big Bash League season. In September 2019, she was named in the M van der Merwe XI squad for the inaugural edition of the Women's T20 Super League in South Africa. In January 2020, she was named in South Africa's squad for the 2020 ICC Women's T20 World Cup in Australia.

In January 2020, in the third WODI against New Zealand, Luus became the first bowler to take two six-wicket hauls in WODI cricket. She took six wickets for 45 runs in ten overs, with South Africa winning the three-match series 3–0. She was also named the player of the series. On 23 July 2020, Luus was named in South Africa's 24-woman squad to begin training in Pretoria, ahead of their tour to England.

In January 2021, in South Africa's series against Pakistan, Luus took her 100th wicket to become the tenth cricketer to score 1,000 runs and take 100 wickets in WODIs.

In February 2022, she was named as the captain of South Africa's team for the 2022 Women's Cricket World Cup in New Zealand, after regular captain Dane van Niekerk was ruled out of the tournament with a fractured ankle. The semi-final match against England, on 31 March 2022, was the 100th WODI for Luus.

In May 2022, she played seven matches for the Tornadoes team at the 2022 FairBreak Invitational T20 in Dubai, United Arab Emirates, with a top score of 66* against the Barmy Army team. In the final of the Invitational, she also hit the tournament-winning runs for the Tornadoes.

In June 2022, Luus was named as the captain of South Africa's Women's Test squad for their one-off match against England Women. She made her Test debut on 27 June 2022, for South Africa against England. In July 2022, she was named as the captain of South Africa's team for the cricket tournament at the 2022 Commonwealth Games in Birmingham, England. In August 2022, she was signed as an overseas player for Trinbago Knight Riders for the inaugural edition of the Women's Caribbean Premier League.

She was named in the South Africa squad for the 2024 ICC Women's T20 World Cup and for their multi-format home series against England in November 2024.
