= Shabnim Ismail =

South African cricketer

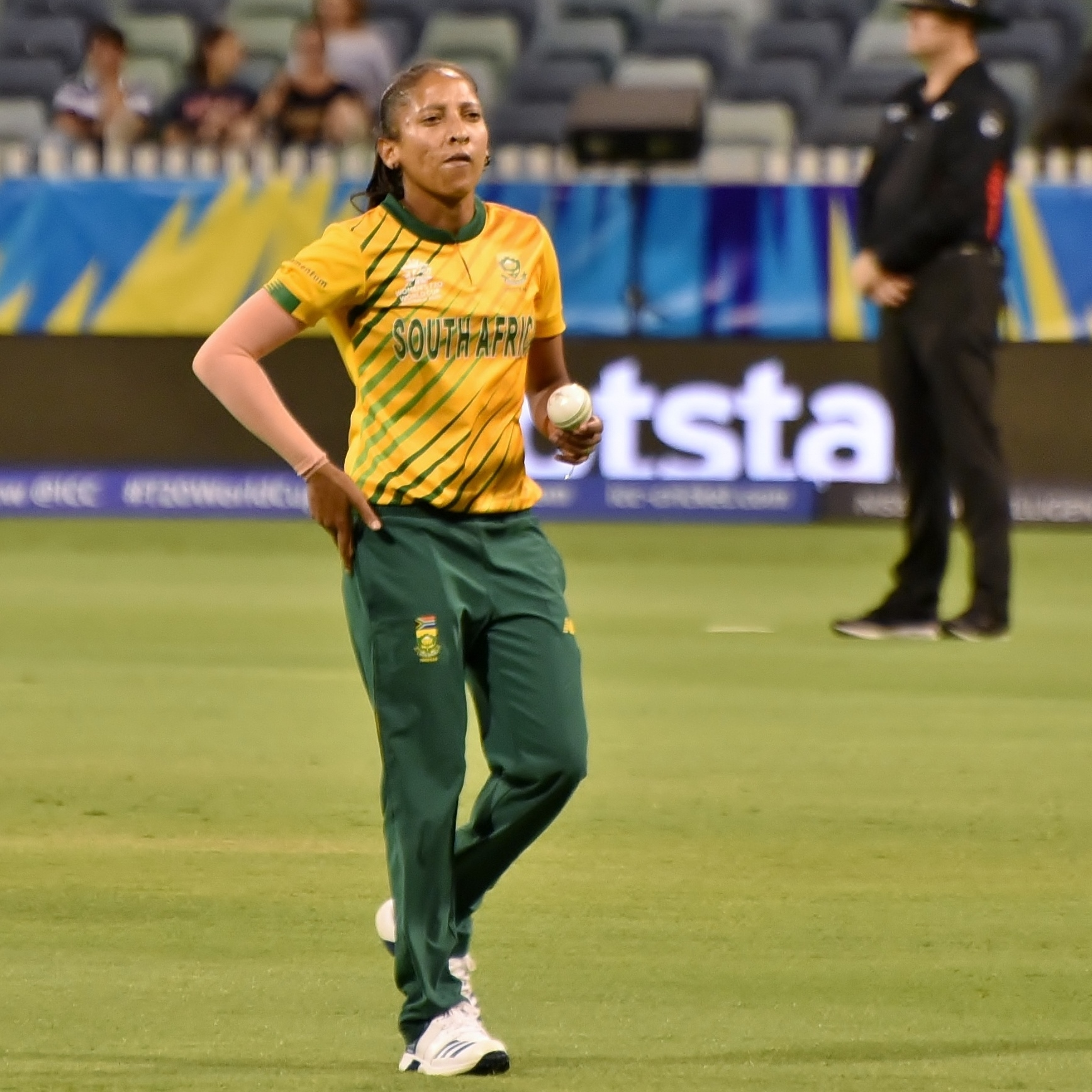
- Ismael playing for South Africa during the 2020 ICC Women's T20 World Cup

Personal information
- Full name: Shabnim Ismail
- Born: 5 October 1988 (age 38); Cape Town, South Africa
- Height: 1.65 m (5 ft 5 in)
- Batting: Left-handed
- Bowling: Right-arm fast
- Role: Bowler

International information
- National side: South Africa (2007–2023, 2026–present)
- Only Test (cap 45): 28 July 2007 v Netherlands
- ODI debut (cap 45): 20 January 2007 v Pakistan
- Last ODI: 18 July 2022 v England
- T20I debut (cap 5): 10 August 2007 v New Zealand
- Last T20I: 26 February 2023 v Australia

Domestic team information
- Years: Team
- 2005/06–2014/15: Western Province
- 2015/16–2018/19: Gauteng
- 2015/16: Melbourne Renegades
- 2016: Yorkshire Diamonds
- 2019/20–2022/23: KwaZulu-Natal Coastal
- 2019/20–2020/21: Sydney Thunder
- 2021–2022: Oval Invincibles
- 2022/23: Melbourne Renegades
- 2023: UP Warriorz
- 2023–present: Welsh Fire
- 2023: Guyana Amazon Warriors
- 2023/24: Central Gauteng
- 2023/24: Hobart Hurricanes
- 2024: Mumbai Indians

Career statistics
Competition	WTest	WODI	WT20I
Matches	1	127	113
Runs scored	1	472	186
Batting average	1.00	10.26	7.15
100s/50s	0/0	0/0	0/0
Top score	1	34	20*
Balls bowled	150	6,170	2,381
Wickets	3	191	123
Bowling average	6.66	19.95	18.62
5 wickets in innings	0	2	2
10 wickets in match	0	0	0
Best bowling	2/5	6/10	5/12
Catches/stumpings	0/–	42/–	36/–
Medal record
Representing South Africa
Women's Cricket
T20 World Cup
Runner-up	2023 South Africa
- Source: ESPNcricinfo, 3 May 2023

Shabnim Ismail (born 5 October 1988) is a South African former international cricketer who made her debut for the national women's team in January 2007. A right-arm fast bowler, Ismail is South Africa's all-time leading wicket-taker in both the One Day International and Twenty20 International formats. She has earned a reputation as one of the fastest female bowlers in the world having recorded the fastest ball bowled by a female of 132.1 kilometres per hour (82.1 mph) during the WPL in 2024. She has played in every edition of the ICC Women's World Twenty20 tournament since its inception in 2009. She has featured in ICC World Twenty20 on eight occasions in 2009, 2010, 2012, 2014, 2016, 2018, 2020, and 2023.

During her early years, she was a second-change bowler and later transformed herself into a frontline bowler leading the bowling attack and usually opening the bowling. She remained a vital cog of South African bowling attack for over a decade. She usually opened the bowling alongside Marizanne Kapp which was arguably one of the best fast-bowling combinations in women's international cricket.

In January 2021, Ismail became just the fourth bowler to take her 100th wicket in WT20Is. As of 2022, she holds the record for having taken the most number of wickets at a single venue in the history of WODIs with 24 scalps which she achieved at the Senwes Park, Potchefstroom.

On 3 May 2023, Ismail announced her retirement from international cricket. On 12 May 2026, Ismail announced she was reversing her decision to retire and was included in South Africa's squad for the 2026 Women's T20 World Cup.

== Early life and education ==
Ismail was born in Cape Town and raised in Cravenby, which is part of the suburb of Parow east of Cape Town's city centre. She is the youngest of seven siblings, whose parents emigrated to South Africa from India.

According to Ismail, "Cravenby is a very sporting-mad town." In its streets, she played cricket, soccer and other sports with many other children, including her older brothers, her cousin Yaseen Vallie (a member of the Western Province cricket team and former national Under-19 player), and future South African international cricketers Vernon Philander and Beuran Hendricks. For the street cricket games, crates would be set up as makeshift wickets, and either an indoor cricket ball or taped-up tennis ball would be used, as a hard ball would have been too much of a hazard to the many nearby windows.

Ismail attended Cravenby Secondary School, a combined school that caters for primary as well as secondary learners. As a young girl, she was unable to play cricket at school, because the school did not organise any cricket. She therefore played football with boys. In her sixth year at school, a boys' cricket team was established, and she played in that team, wearing her football shorts. She has said that playing against boys made her stronger.

Ismail's mother and, especially, her grandfather were sports mad. They both encouraged her to play and watch cricket, and read cricket books.

One day in 2004, while playing football with boys, Ismail was approached by a woman who asked her whether she played cricket. After receiving a positive answer, the woman recruited her into the Primrose Cricket Club.

During her early days with the club, Ismail focused on batting, but did not like being dismissed. She threatened several times to quit the game. A coach suggested that she concentrate on bowling instead. Before long, she had been nicknamed "The Demon", due to her propensity for bowling bouncers.

Meanwhile, almost immediately after joining the club, Ismail made her debut for the Western Province Under-16 team. Soon afterwards, she was added to the Western Province senior squad.

After leaving school, Ismail worked for seven years as a speed-point technician, maintaining the credit and debit card machines used to make electronic funds transfers at point of sale. As of August 2016, she was studying to become a mechanical engineer.

== Domestic career ==
=== South Africa ===
Ismail made her senior debut for Western Province in October 2005 (aged 17), during the 2005–06 season of South Africa's Women's Provincial League. She took 15 wickets in her debut season, the second-most for Western Province behind Shandre Fritz and Alexis le Breton. This was followed by 21 wickets during the 2007–08 season, which was the sixth-most in the competition. Ismail has played in the Provincial League's final on a number of occasions throughout her career. She switched from Western Province to Gauteng for the 2015–16 season.

In September 2019, she was named in the Devnarain XI squad for the inaugural edition of the Women's T20 Super League in South Africa.

=== Australia ===
In December 2015, several weeks into the inaugural season of Australia's Women's Big Bash League, Ismail signed with the Melbourne Renegades as an overseas marquee player, temporarily replacing Rachel Priest. On debut against the Melbourne Stars, Ismail took 3/10 from four overs in a five-wicket victory. She played in one more game, an eight-run loss to the Stars, before Priest returned to the line-up.

Ahead of the 2019–20 season, Ismail signed with the Sydney Thunder for WBBL|05. Despite finishing with a modest total of ten wickets (ranking 25th in the league), she was the third-most economical bowler throughout the tournament by conceding 5.88 runs per over. In an article for The Sydney Morning Herald, written by Thunder captain Rachael Haynes, the fielding ability of Ismail was praised as one of the top five highlights of the season.

She was re-signed by Sydney Thunder ahead of the WBBL|06 season. She was a crucial member of the Sydney Thunder team which won the WBBL|06 and also delivered a match winning spell of 2/12 including the big scalp of Meg Lanning in the WBBL final to restrict Melbourne Stars to 86/9 in their 20 overs. She was also awarded the player of the final award for creating an early momentum by taking key early wickets in the final which propelled Sydney Thunder for their second WBBL title. She also went onto become the first South African player to win the Player of the Final Award in the Women's Big Bash League final.

However, she was ruled out of the WBBL|07 edition due to a prolonged knee injury.

=== England ===
In 2016, for the inaugural season of England's Women's Cricket Super League, Ismail signed with the Yorkshire Diamonds. She was one of the team's three overseas players, along with Australians Alex Blackwell and Beth Mooney, and one of only four South Africans across the competition. Ismail played in all five matches for the Diamonds and took six wickets, behind only Danielle Hazell among her teammates. Her best figures were 2/16 from two overs against the Western Storm, while she also took 2/23 from four overs against the Lancashire Thunder.

She was signed up by Oval Invincibles as a replacement player for Rachael Haynes in the inaugural edition of the Women's Hundred competition for the 2021 season. In April 2022, she was bought by the Oval Invincibles for the 2022 season of The Hundred.

== International career ==
Ismail made her international debut for South Africa in January 2007 (aged 18), in a One Day International (ODI) against Pakistan. Her Test and Twenty20 International debuts came in the same year, against the Netherlands and New Zealand, respectively. Ismail was selected in South Africa's squad for the 2009 World Cup in Australia, but took only a single wicket from her three matches. At the 2009 World Twenty20 in England later in the year, she took seven wickets from three games (including 3/27 against Australia), which was the most for South Africa and the equal third-most overall.

At the 2011 World Cup Qualifier in Bangladesh, Ismail took 6/10 in one match against the Netherlands, helping bowl the team out for just 36 runs. The performance set a new ODI record for South Africa, and was the equal fourth-best bowling performance across all women's ODIs at the time. She enjoyed more good form at the 2013 World Cup in India, finishing with eleven wickets from seven matches—the most for South Africa and the equal fifth-most overall. Her campaign included figures of 4/41 against Australia, 2/18 against Pakistan, and 2/22 against Sri Lanka. She was also one of the first female cricketers to be contracted by Cricket South Africa when Cricket South Africa made a landmark move to award full-time contracts to women cricketers in 2013. In 2013, she was just one of six women players to be awarded central contracts.

With seven wickets from five games, Ismail was South Africa's equal-leading wicket-taker (with Marizanne Kapp) at the 2014 World Twenty20 in Bangladesh. She took 3/5 from three overs against Ireland, helping to secure the team's first semi-final appearance in the tournament's history. South Africa had less success at the 2016 edition in India, however, managing to win only one match. Ismail also had little success, taking three wickets from her four matches. During a 2017 match against England, she set an unenviable new record for most runs conceded in a Women's Cricket World Cup innings, finishing with figures of 1/89.

In March 2018, Ismail was one of fourteen players to be awarded a national contract by Cricket South Africa ahead of the 2018–19 season. In October 2018, she was named in South Africa's squad for the 2018 ICC Women's World Twenty20 in the West Indies. She was the joint-leading wicket-taker for South Africa in the tournament, with six scalps in four matches. Following the competition's conclusion, the International Cricket Council highlighted her as the team's standout player.

In January 2020, Ismail was named in South Africa's squad for the 2020 ICC Women's T20 World Cup in Australia. She went on take five wickets in four matches, including 3/8 from 3.1 overs against Thailand. Her team was knocked out of the tournament via a semi-final defeat to the host nation.

On 23 July 2020, Ismail was named in South Africa's 24-woman squad to begin training in Pretoria, ahead of their tour to England. In February 2022, she was named in South Africa's team for the 2022 Women's Cricket World Cup in New Zealand.

In January 2021, she became the first South African to take 100 wickets in WT20Is when she achieved the feat against Pakistan in the first WT20I of the series. In the second WT20I of the series, she registered her career best bowling figures of 5/12 which also helped her to make substantial gains in ICC Rankings and also ensured South Africa a comfortable series win with an unassailable 2–0 lead. At one stage her bowling spell which was read as 3-0-9-3 reduced Pakistan to a precarious 20 for 4. She achieved her career highest ranking of no 2 in ICC WT20I rankings for bowlers following her career best bowling performance.

In March 2021, during South Africa's tour of India, Ismail became the first bowler for South Africa to take 150 wickets in WODIs.

Her bowling spell of 4/44 against West Indies in the fourth and final WODI of the series in February 2022 against the West Indies secured 2–1 series win for South Africa, making it the fifth consecutive series win for South Africa in WODIs. She also ended the series as the joint wicket taker alongside fellow South African Ayabonga Khaka with ten scalps.

In May 2022, she played five matches for the Sapphires team at the 2022 FairBreak Invitational T20 in Dubai, United Arab Emirates, with a best performance of 3/20 against the Tornadoes team. The following month, in the second match against Ireland, Ismail played in her 100th WT20I.

In July 2022, she was named in South Africa's team for the cricket tournament at the 2022 Commonwealth Games in Birmingham, England.

Ismail was part of the South Africa squad for the 2023 ICC Women's T20 World Cup, taking two wickets as they lost in the final to Australia.

She announced her retirement from international cricket on 3 May 2023.

In 2026, Ismail reversed her retirement and was selected in South Africa 2026 Women's T20 World Cup squad. She finished the tournament with 8 wickets and became the bowler with the most wickets in Women's T20WC history with 50, surpassing Australia fast bowler Megan Schutt's 48.

== Honours ==
She won the CSA Women's Cricketer of the Year award at the 2015 annual South Africa Cricket Awards ceremony. In 2015, she was also nominated as one of the three finalists for South Africa Sportswoman of the Year at the annual South African Sports award.

In July 2020, Ismail was named women's T20 player of the year at Cricket South Africa's annual awards ceremony.

In February 2021, Ismail was named the Women's Player of the Month in the first edition of the ICC Player of the Month Awards.

She was also named in both ICC Women's ODI Team of the Year and ICC Women's T20I Team of the Year as part of the 2021 ICC Awards.

== Personal life ==
Ismail considers South African seamer Andre Nel as her inspiration and role model due to his on-field aggression. She also chose the jersey number 89 on her shirt, a number which was worn by Andre Nel when he played at international level. She was also inspired by the physical intensity and aggression of South African seamer Dale Steyn who would go about his business on the opposition batters.

In 2014, she was embroiled in an alcohol abuse incident and was one of the South African players to be briefly suspended from the National Academy. She was also ordered to undergo counselling related to the alleged alcohol abuse.

Ismail is a practising Muslim, and is the only Muslim woman to have played international cricket for South Africa. She has also known to have obsessive–compulsive disorder (OCD).
