= Dane van Niekerk =

South African cricketer (born 1993)

Dané van Niekerk
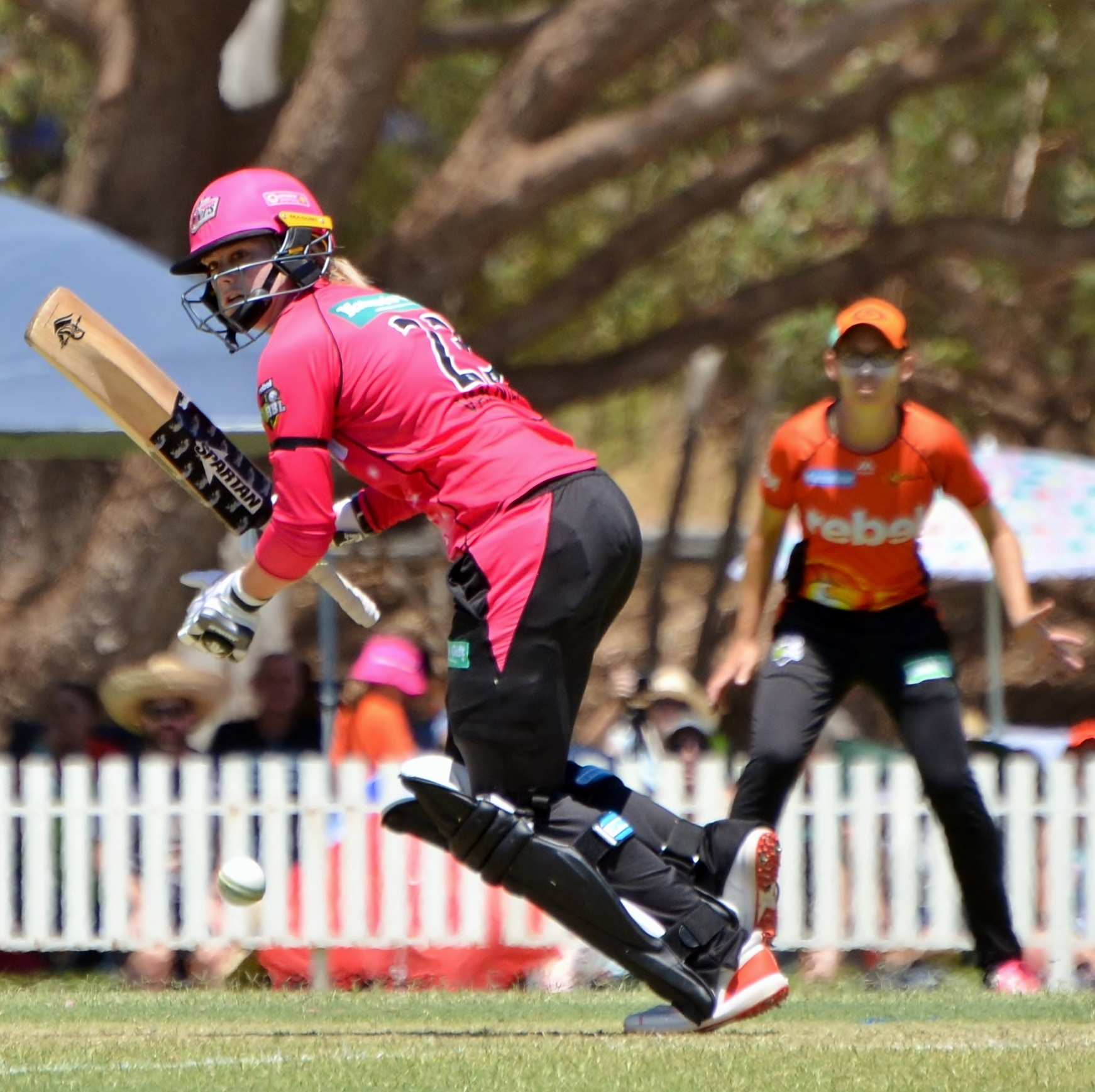
- Van Niekerk batting for Sydney Sixers during WBBL|03

Personal information
- Full name: Dané van Niekerk
- Born: 14 May 1993 (age 33); Pretoria, South Africa
- Height: 169 cm (5 ft 7 in)
- Batting: Right-handed
- Bowling: Right arm leg break
- Role: All-rounder
- Relatives: Marizanne Kapp (m. 2018)

International information
- National side: South Africa (2009–present)
- Only Test (cap 57): 16 November 2014 v India
- ODI debut (cap 53): 8 March 2009 v West Indies
- Last ODI: 19 December 2021 v Ireland
- ODI shirt no.: 81
- T20I debut (cap 18): 11 June 2009 v West Indies
- Last T20I: 7 December 2025 v Ireland

Domestic team information
- Years: Team
- 2007/08–2011/12: Northerns
- 2012/13–present: Eastern Province
- 2015/16: Melbourne Renegades
- 2016: Loughborough Lightning
- 2016/17–2020/21: Sydney Sixers
- 2018–2019: Surrey Stars
- 2021–2023: Oval Invincibles
- 2021/22: Adelaide Strikers
- 2023: Royal Challengers Bangalore
- 2023: Sunrisers
- 2024/25: Western Province

Career statistics
Competition	WTest	WODI	WT20I
Matches	1	110	88
Runs scored	22	2,273	1,939
Batting average	11.00	36.66	28.51
100s/50s	0/0	1/10	0/10
Top score	15	102	90*
Balls bowled	222	4,578	1,500
Wickets	1	138	65
Bowling average	90.00	19.14	20.96
5 wickets in innings	0	2	0
10 wickets in match	0	0	0
Best bowling	1/90	5/17	4/17
Catches/stumpings	0/–	57/–	25/–
- Source: ESPNcricinfo, 19 December 2025

Dané van Niekerk (/dəˈneɪ vəniːˈkərk/ də-NAY va-nee-KURK, Afrikaans pronunciation: [daˈnɛ fan ˈnikærk]; born 14 May 1993) is a South African cricketer born in Pretoria and educated at Hoërskool Centurion. A right-handed batter and leg break bowler, she played for South Africa in Test matches, One Day Internationals (ODI) and Twenty20 Internationals (T20I) between 2009 and 2021, and was captain of the side between 2016 and 2021. She was the first bowler for South Africa to take 100 wickets in WODIs.

== Domestic and T20 career ==
She played domestically for Highveld Women and Northerns Women before becoming one of the first two South African women (along with Marizanne Kapp) to be included in the Eastern Province cricket team academy (men's team).

In 2015, she took part in the inaugural season of the Australian Women's Big Bash League playing for the Melbourne Renegades.

In November 2018, she was named in the Sydney Sixers' squad for the 2018–19 Women's Big Bash League season. In September 2019, she was named in the Devnarain XI squad for the inaugural edition of the Women's T20 Super League in South Africa. In 2021, she was drafted by Oval Invincibles for the inaugural season of The Hundred. She was the highest run-scorer in the women's Hundred tournament with 259 runs.

In April 2022, she was bought by the Oval Invincibles for the 2022 season of The Hundred.

In the inaugural season of the Women's Premier League in 2023, van Niekerk was bought by Royal Challengers Bangalore at the price of 30 Lakhs. In March 2023, it was announced that she had signed for Sunrisers for the upcoming season, between May and August. During her stint with Sunrisers, she became captain of the side. In February 2024, it was announced that she had re-signed for Sunrisers for part of the 2024 season.

Van Niekerk joined Western Province for the 2024/25 South African domestic season.

== International career ==
She was selected as part of the South Africa national women's cricket team for the 2009 Women's Cricket World Cup in Australia, becoming a regular presence in the squad. She played in the 2013 Women's Cricket World Cup, as well as representing South Africa at the Women's World Twenty20 in 2009, 2010, 2012, 2014 and 2016.

Bowling leg-spin, she made her debut at 16 years of age in March 2009, during the World Cup match against the West Indies at Newcastle. In her second match, she took 3/11 as South Africa beat Sri Lanka in Sydney to claim 7th place in the tournament. Through the years she has developed into an all-rounder and became a T20I opening batter.

In January 2013, she became the first South African woman to take an international hat-trick, finishing with 5/28 in an ODI match against the West Indies. A month later she scored her first ODI half century with a 55 not out during a World Cup match against Pakistan. She shared a partnership of 128 runs with Marizanne Kapp, the highest South African partnership for the 6th wicket.

In January 2014 against Pakistan, van Niekerk took her second ODI five-wicket haul with 5/17. She was the first South African woman player to achieve two five-wicket hauls in ODIs. Later that year, facing Pakistan at the Women's World T20I, she scored 90 not out in a 163 run unbroken partnership with Lizelle Lee, which is the second highest individual score in T20I by a South African woman and the second highest partnership in all women's T20I history.

On 21 June 2016, she was appointed as South Africa women's captain for all forms (Test, ODI and T20I) following Mignon du Preez's decision to step down as captain.

In February 2017, during the 2017 Women's Cricket World Cup Qualifier, she became the seventh player to reach 1,000 runs and take 100 wickets in WODIs. She also became the first player for South Africa to take 100 wickets in WODIs.

She went on to become the first ever bowler (male or female) to take four wickets in international cricket history without conceding a single run and also set the record for recording the best bowling figures for South Africa in Women's World Cup history. She also became the leading wicket taker during the 2017 ICC Women's World Cup tournament with 15 scalps.

In December 2017, she was named as one of the players in the ICC Women's ODI Team of the Year.

In March 2018, she was one of fourteen players to be awarded a national contract by Cricket South Africa ahead of the 2018–19 season. In October 2018, she was named as the captain of South Africa's squad for the 2018 ICC Women's World Twenty20 tournament in the West Indies. Ahead of the tournament, she was named as the star of the team and one of the players to watch. She was the joint-leading wicket-taker for South Africa in the tournament, with six dismissals in four matches.

In February 2019, during the first WODI against Sri Lanka Women, she scored her first century in a WODI match In the process, she also became the fourth cricketer for South Africa Women to score 2,000 runs in WODIs, and became the fourth woman to achieve the double of reaching 2,000 runs and taking 100 wickets in WODIs.

In August 2019, she was named the Women's Cricketer of the Year at Cricket South Africa's annual award ceremony. In January 2020, she was named as the captain of South Africa's squad for the 2020 ICC Women's T20 World Cup in Australia. On 23 July 2020, van Niekerk was named in South Africa's 24-woman squad to begin training in Pretoria, ahead of their tour to England.

Van Niekerk retired from international cricket in March 2023 after being left out of the squad for the 2023 ICC Women's T20 World Cup for what Cricket South Africa said was failing "to meet the minimum criteria for fitness." She reversed this decision in July 2024.

== Personal life ==
Van Niekerk is openly a member of the LGBTQ+ community. In July 2018, she married her teammate Marizanne Kapp.
