= Marizanne Kapp =

South African cricketer (born 1990)

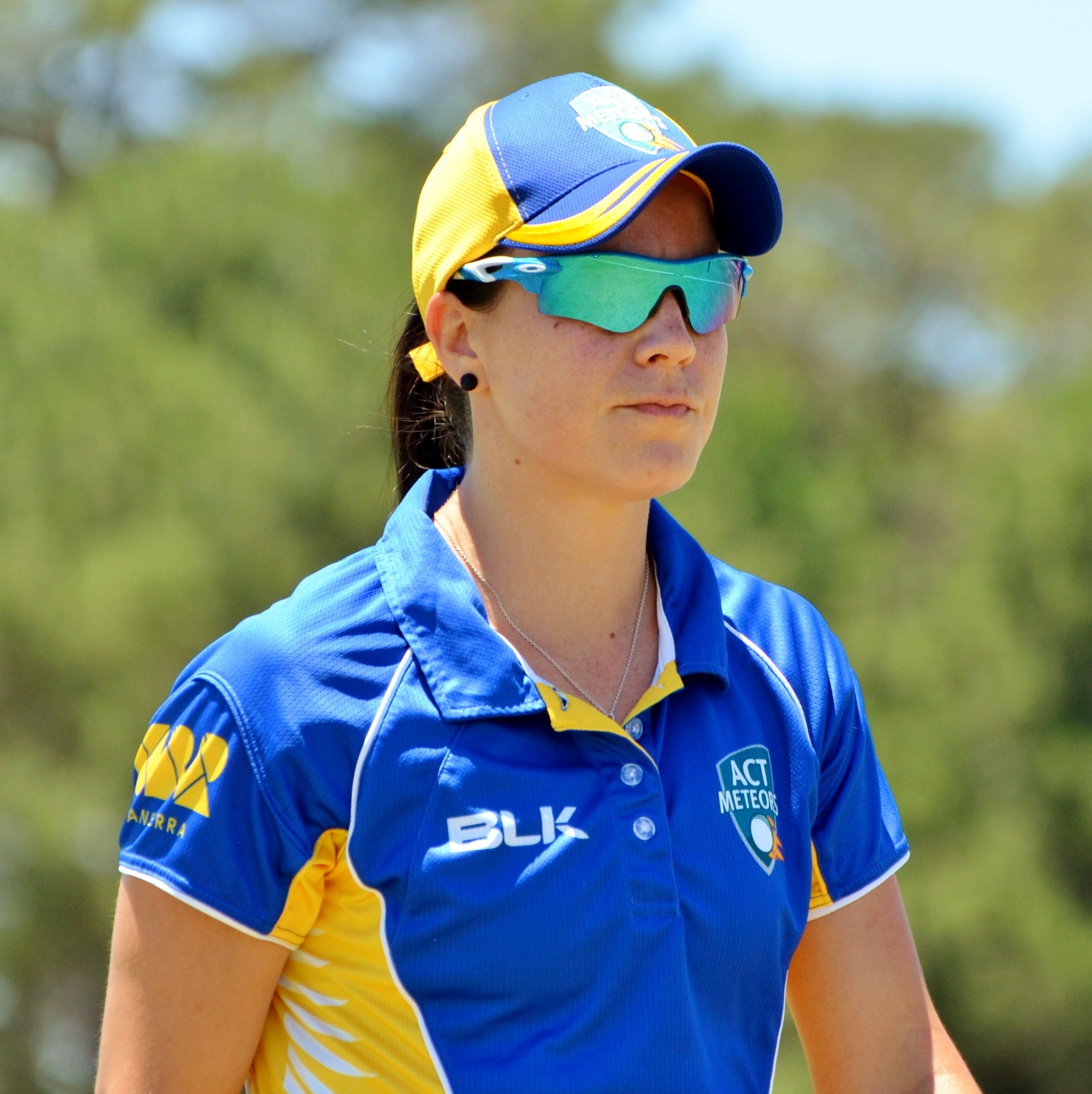
- Kapp fielding for the ACT Meteors in 2017

Personal information
- Born: 4 January 1990 (age 36); Port Elizabeth, Eastern Cape, South Africa
- Nickname: Kappie
- Height: 173 cm (5 ft 8 in)
- Batting: Right-handed
- Bowling: Right-arm medium
- Role: All-rounder
- Relatives: Dane van Niekerk (m. 2018)

International information
- National side: South Africa (2009–present)
- Test debut (cap 52): 16 November 2014 v India
- Last Test: 28 June 2024 v India
- ODI debut (cap 54): 10 March 2009 v Australia
- Last ODI: 2 November 2025 v India
- ODI shirt no.: 7
- T20I debut (cap 19): 16 June 2009 v Australia
- Last T20I: 16 February 2026 v Pakistan
- T20I shirt no.: 7

Domestic team information
- Years: Team
- 2004/05–present: Eastern Province
- 2009/10–2011/12: Northerns
- 2015/16–2020/21: Sydney Sixers
- 2016: Surrey
- 2016–2019: Surrey Stars
- 2017/18: Australian Capital Territory
- 2021–2025: Oval Invincibles
- 2021/22–2022/23: Perth Scorchers
- 2023–present: Delhi Capitals
- 2023–present: Barbados Royals
- 2023/24: Sydney Thunder
- 2024/25–present: Melbourne Stars
- 2026–present: London Spirit

Career statistics
Competition	WTest	WODI	WT20I
Matches	4	146	113
Runs scored	395	3,977	1,625
Batting average	56.42	35.11	20.56
100s/50s	1/2	4/17	0/5
Top score	150	114	75
Balls bowled	288	6,851	2,052
Wickets	1	181	92
Bowling average	89.0	24.24	20.71
5 wickets in innings	–	1	0
10 wickets in match	–	0	0
Best bowling	1/20	5/20	4/6
Catches/stumpings	2/–	36/–	19/–
Medal record
Women's cricket
Representing South Africa
ICC Cricket World Cup
Runner-up	2025 India
ICC T20 World Cup
Runner-up	2023 South Africa
Runner-up	2024 UAE
- Source: ESPNcricinfo, 3 November 2025

Marizanne Kapp (/mɑːriːˈzɑːn ˈkæp/ mah-ree-ZAHN KAP, Afrikaans pronunciation: [mɑːriˈzɑːn_ˈkæp]; born 4 January 1990) is a South African international cricketer who plays for South Africa national women's cricket team. She was the first female cricketer to take a hat-trick in a T20 match for South Africa.

== Career ==
In December 2017, she was named as one of the players in the ICC Women's ODI Team of the Year.

In March 2018, she was one of fourteen players to be awarded a national contract by Cricket South Africa ahead of the 2018–19 season. In September 2018, she took her 100th wicket in WODIs, during the series against the West Indies.

In October 2018, she was named in South Africa's squad for the 2018 ICC Women's World Twenty20 tournament in the West Indies. She was the leading run-scorer for South Africa in the tournament, with 98 runs in four matches.

In November 2018, she was named in the Sydney Sixers' squad for the 2018–19 Women's Big Bash League season. In May 2019, in the first WODI against Pakistan, Kapp became the third cricketer for South Africa to play in 100 WODI matches.

In September 2019, she was named in the M van der Merwe XI squad for the inaugural edition of the Women's T20 Super League in South Africa. In January 2020, she was named in South Africa's squad for the 2020 ICC Women's T20 World Cup in Australia. On 23 July 2020, Kapp was named in South Africa's 24-woman squad to begin training in Pretoria, ahead of their tour to England. In 2021, she was drafted by Oval Invincibles for the inaugural season of The Hundred.

In February 2022, she was named in South Africa's team for the 2022 Women's Cricket World Cup in New Zealand. On 14 March 2022, in South Africa's World Cup match against England, Kapp took her first five-wicket haul in WODI cricket.

In April 2022, she was bought by the Oval Invincibles for the 2022 season of The Hundred in England. They later won the competition and she was named Player of the Match for her match-winning innings in the final.

In May 2022, she played two matches for the Falcons team at the 2022 FairBreak Invitational T20 in Dubai, United Arab Emirates. In the final of the Invitational, against the Tornadoes team, she made 67* with six fours and two sixes, and was awarded player of the match, but her outstanding performance failed to prevent the Tornadoes from winning the tournament.

In June 2022, in the one-off Test against England, Kapp scored her first century in Test cricket, with 150 runs. Her total was also the highest individual score for South Africa in a women's Test match. In July 2022, she was named in South Africa's team for the cricket tournament at the 2022 Commonwealth Games in Birmingham, England. However, Kapp was later ruled out of the tournament over what were initially said to be family reasons. She chose to return to South Africa after her brother-in-law suffered serious injuries in an accident which left him in intensive care.

She was named in the South Africa squad for the 2024 ICC Women's T20 World Cup and for the ODI part of their multi-format home series against England in November 2024.

As of October 2025, she was playing in the ICC Women's World Cup as an all-rounder for South Africa. For highlights: she was named player of the match in her match against Pakistan after scoring 68*(43) and taking 3-20, and during the semi-final she took 5-20, which included two double wicket maidens, becoming the highest wicket taker in the history of the ICC women's world cup with 44 wickets.

== Personal life ==
In July 2018, she married her teammate and former captain of the South African Women's cricket team Dane van Niekerk.
