= Marcia Letsoalo =

South African cricketer (born 1984)

Personal information
- Full name: Matshipi Marcia Letsoalo
- Born: 11 April 1984 (age 42); Phalaborwa, Northern Province, South Africa
- Batting: Right-handed
- Bowling: Right-arm medium
- Role: Bowler

International information
- National side: South Africa (2007–2017)
- Test debut (cap 47): 28 July 2007 v Netherlands
- Last Test: 16 November 2014 v India
- ODI debut (cap 46): 20 January 2007 v Pakistan
- Last ODI: 21 February 2017 v India
- T20I debut (cap 7): 10 August 2007 v New Zealand
- Last T20I: 3 August 2016 v Ireland

Domestic team information
- Years: Team
- 2004/05–2017/18: Northerns

Career statistics
Competition	WTest	WODI	WT20I	WLA
Matches	2	68	48	159
Runs scored	9	68	20	374
Batting average	3.00	6.18	3.33	8.50
100s/50s	0/0	0/0	0/0	0/0
Top score	6	14*	10	26
Balls bowled	240	2,615	626	6,015
Wickets	0	44	19	142
Bowling average	–	34.13	34.84	22.11
5 wickets in innings	0	0	0	0
10 wickets in match	0	0	0	0
Best bowling	–	3/13	2/15	4/8
Catches/stumpings	1/–	14/–	11/–	47/–
- Source: CricketArchive, 26 February 2022

Matshipi Marcia Letsoalo (born 11 April 1984) is a South African former cricketer who played as a right-arm medium bowler. She appeared in two Test matches, 68 One Day Internationals and 48 Twenty20 Internationals for South Africa between 2007 and 2017. She played domestic cricket for Northerns.

Marcia Letsoalo's love for cricket began when she watched the South Africa men's team play on TV.
