= Mignon du Preez =

South African cricketer

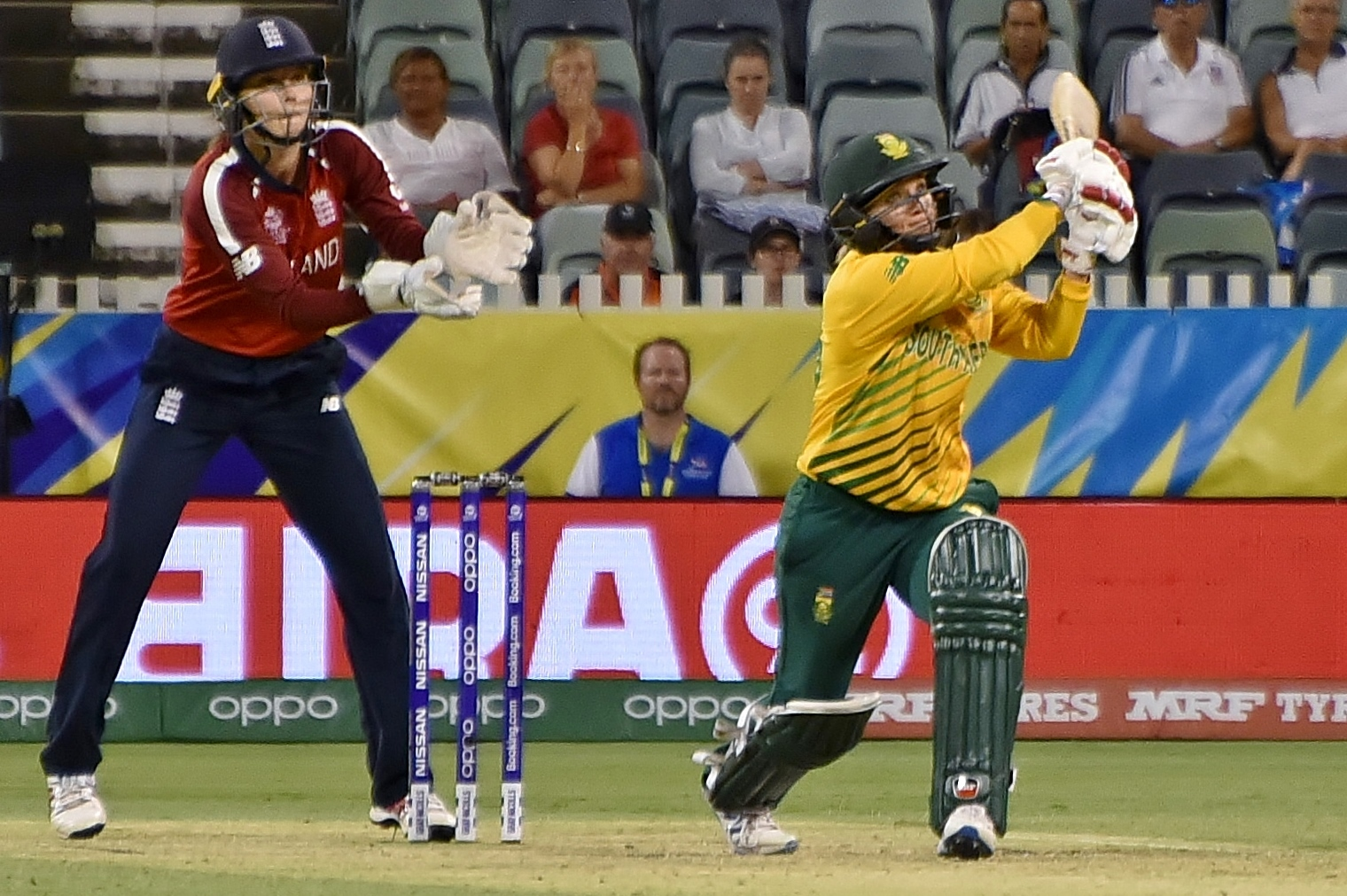
- Du Preez batting for South Africa during the 2020 ICC Women's T20 World Cup

Personal information
- Full name: Mignon du Preez
- Born: 13 June 1989 (age 37); Pretoria, South Africa
- Nickname: Minx
- Height: 161 cm (5 ft 3 in)
- Batting: Right-handed
- Role: Batter, occasional wicket-keeper

International information
- National side: South Africa (2007–2022)
- Only Test (cap 50): 16 November 2014 v India
- ODI debut (cap 49): 22 January 2007 v Pakistan
- Last ODI: 31 March 2022 v England
- ODI shirt no.: 22
- T20I debut (cap 4): 10 August 2007 v New Zealand
- Last T20I: 4 August 2022 v Sri Lanka

Domestic team information
- Years: Team
- 2003/04–2020/21: Northerns
- 2015/16–2020: Melbourne Stars
- 2017: Sussex
- 2017–2018: Southern Vipers
- 2019: Loughborough Lightning
- 2021: Manchester Originals
- 2021–2022: Hobart Hurricanes
- 2022: Trent Rockets
- 2023–: Trinbago Knight Riders
- 2023: Brisbane Heat

Career statistics
Competition	WTest	WODI	WT20I
Matches	1	154	114
Runs scored	119	3,760	1,805
Batting average	59.50	32.98	20.98
100s/50s	1/0	2/18	0/7
Top score	102	116*	69
Balls bowled	6	29	18
Wickets	0	1	0
Bowling average	–	31.00	–
5 wickets in innings	0	0	0
10 wickets in match	0	0	0
Best bowling	–	1/9	–
Catches/stumpings	0/–	37/0	26/–
- Source: ESPNcricinfo, 15 September 2022

Mignon du Preez (born 13 June 1989) is a South African former cricketer, who was the women's team captain in all three forms of cricket, Test matches, ODIs and T20Is, from 2007 to 2018. A right-handed batter and occasional wicket-keeper, du Preez made her debut for the South Africa national women's cricket team in January 2007, aged seventeen. Besides being the South African player with most matches as captain in both ODIs and T20Is, she is the highest run-scorer for South Africa women in ODIs and T20Is. In April 2022, du Preez announced her retirement from Test and ODI cricket, allowing her to focus on the shorter format of the game and spend more time with her family. In December 2022, she further announced her retirement from T20Is, but confirmed her continued availability for domestic T20 leagues.

== Early life and education ==
Du Preez was born and raised in Pretoria. She started playing cricket "by accident" at the age of four. Her father was the coach of her brother's u/7 mini cricket team, and she would watch the team's games. In 2022, she told The Express Tribune:

"... as a supportive baby sister, I always went with the two men in my life to watch my brother play. Even as a supporter I made sure that I was fully kitted out in the mini cricket shirts and shorts. One day, one of the players couldn’t manage to get to the game on time and they needed a player to fill the spot. Since I was already dressed accordingly, they asked me to help out."

She ended up being named as the day's 'best batter', an accolade that kindled her love for the game.

Du Preez attended Doringkloof Primary School and Zwartkop High School. When she was 12 years old, she achieved the remarkable feat of scoring 258, at a strike rate of over 200, in a provincial Under-13 match between Gauteng and North Gauteng. During that innings, she hit 16 sixes and 25 fours.

After playing primary school cricket mainly in boys' teams, du Preez was fortunate that her high school was one of the very few in the region with a girls' cricket team. From a very young age, she also had access around her home town area to good sports facilities, including some of the facilities at Centurion Park. Her parents provided her with strong support, and, in particular, were always willing to drive her to training.

Her father and brother continued to play cricket, especially indoor cricket at a competitive (national and international) level.

As a young cricketer, du Preez found that her biggest challenge was to change people's perceptions that cricket is only a 'boy's sport'. She has explained that at that time, women's cricket was still exclusively amateur in nature, with limited funding and not many female role models. Her own sports hero was Indian cricketer Sachin Tendulkar. In South Africa, she believes, the challenges to women cricketers eased as the game became more professional.

After leaving school, du Preez obtained an honours degree in marketing from the University of Pretoria.

== Career ==
Du Preez made her debut for South Africa in 2007.

In 2014, du Preez captained South Africa in her debut and only Test match, against India at the Srikantadatta Narasimha Raja Wadeyar Ground in Mysore. India batted first, and declared at 400 for 6. Du Preez then scored 102 in her maiden Test innings, but her team's total of 234 was not enough to prevent India from enforcing the follow on. South Africa made only 132 in its second innings, and lost the match by an innings and 34 runs.

On 21 February 2016, she became the first South African women to score 1,000 career runs in T20I during a match against England. On 21 June 2016, she decided to step down as South Africa women's captain, after having led the team for almost 5 years (since 2011) in one Test, 46 ODIs and 50 T20Is.

On 25 June 2017, in South Africa's match against Pakistan in the 2017 Women's Cricket World Cup, she became the first woman for South Africa to play in 100 ODI matches.

In March 2018, she was one of fourteen players to be awarded a national contract by Cricket South Africa ahead of the 2018–19 season. In October 2018, she was named in South Africa's squad for the 2018 ICC Women's World Twenty20 tournament in the West Indies.

In November 2018, she was contracted by Melbourne Stars for the 2018–19 Women's Big Bash League season. In September 2019, she was named in the Devnarain XI squad for the inaugural edition of the Women's T20 Super League in South Africa. In January 2020, she was named in South Africa's squad for the 2020 ICC Women's T20 World Cup in Australia. In their opening match of the tournament, against England, du Preez played in her 100th WT20I match.

On 23 July 2020, du Preez was named in South Africa's 24-woman squad to begin training in Pretoria, ahead of their tour to England. In 2021, she was drafted by Manchester Originals for the inaugural season of The Hundred.

In February 2022, she was named in South Africa's team for the 2022 Women's Cricket World Cup in New Zealand. In April 2022, she was bought by the Trent Rockets for the 2022 season of The Hundred in England.

On 7 April 2022, she announced her retirement from longer formats of cricket.

In May 2022, she played five matches for the Warriors team in the 2022 FairBreak Invitational T20 in Dubai, United Arab Emirates. During the Invitational, she scored a total of 120 runs with a top score of 75*, and also took arguably the catch of the tournament to dismiss her South African teammate, Laura Wolvaardt.

In July 2022, she was named in South Africa's team for the cricket tournament at the 2022 Commonwealth Games in Birmingham, England.

She announced her retirement from all forms of international cricket on 9 December 2022.

== Personal life ==
Du Preez's nickname is "Minx". She and her husband, Tony van der Merwe, an urban planner, were married on 5 December 2015. In June 2024 the couple announced Mignon was pregnant with twins. Du Preez was raised in a Christian household, and dedicated her life to Jesus while attending a youth seminar at the age of 10. She has said that the sports in which she has been involved have "... never placed any limitation on my Christianity ..."
