= West Indies women's cricket team in Sri Lanka in 2015 =

	Sri Lanka	West Indies
- Dates: 13 May – 26 May 2015
Captains	Prasadani Weerakkody - first two ODIs. Chamari Atapattu - next two ODIs & T20Is	Merissa Aguilleira - ODI & T20I

One Day International series
- Results: West Indies won the 4-match series 3–1
Most runs	Shashikala Siriwardene (88)	Deandra Dottin (175)
Most wickets	Inoka Ranaweera (5)	Hayley Matthews (8)
- Player of the series: Deandra Dottin (WIWmn)

Twenty20 International series
- Results: West Indies won the 3-match series 2–1
Most runs	Chamari Atapattu (87)	Stefanie Taylor (187)
Most wickets	Sripali Weerakkody (2)	Hayley Matthews (5)
- Player of the series: Hayley Matthews (WIWmn)

The West Indies women's cricket team toured Sri Lanka from 13 to 26 May 2015. The tour included four One Day Internationals (ODI) and three Twenty20 Internationals (T20I). The later three matches of the ODI series were part of the ICC Women's Championship. The West Indies won both series, the ODI by 3–1 and the T20I by 2–1.

== Squads ==
ODIs		T20I	
West Indies	Sri Lanka	West Indies	Sri Lanka
Merissa Aguilleira (c) (wk); Hayley Matthews; Stafanie Taylor; Shemaine Campbelle; Deandra Dottin; Kycia Knight; Stacy-Ann King; Afy Fletcher; Anisa Mohammed; Tremayne Smartt; Shamilia Connell; Chinelle Henry	Chamari Atapattu (c); Prasadini Weerakkody (wk); Nipuni Hansika; Sanduni Abeywickrema; Dilani Manodara; Shashikala Siriwardene; Eshani Kaushalya; Sripali Weerakkody; Ama Kanchana; Inoka Ranaweera; Sugandika Kumari; Lasanthi Madushani; Chathurani Gunawardene; Maduri Samuddika; Stand-by Players: Yasoda Mendis; Oshadi Ranasinghe; Udeshika Prabodhani; Achini Kulasooriya; Hasini Perera; Chamari Polgampola; Nilakshi de Silva|	Merissa Aguilleira (c); Hayley Matthews; Stafanie Taylor; Shemaine Campbelle; Deandra Dottin; Kycia Knight (wk); Stacy-Ann King; Afy Fletcher; Anisa Mohammed; Tremayne Smartt; Shamilia Connell; Chinelle Henry	Chamari Atapattu (c); Eshani Kaushalya; Yasoda Mendis; Dilani Manodara; Shashikala Siriwardene; Sripali Weerakkody; Nipuni Hansika; Ama Kanchana; Inoka Ranaweera; Sugandika Kumari; Udeshika Prabodhani; Hasini Perera; Maduri Samuddika; Chathurani Gunawardene

== ODI series ==
=== 1st ODI ===
13 May
09:50 SLST
(UTC+05:30)
Scorecard

Sri Lanka; 149 (49.5 overs)	v	West Indies; 153/5 (40.1 overs)
Prasadani Weerakkody 42 (70); Hayley Matthews 3/19 (7 overs)		Deandra Dottin 84* (113); Eshani Kaushalya 2/4 (3 overs)

West Indies Women won by 5 wickets
R. Premadasa Stadium, Colombo
Umpires: Deepal Gunawardene (SL) and Prageeth Rambukwella (SL)
Player of the match: Deandra Dottin (West Indies Women)

- Sri Lanka Women won the loss and chose to bat
- Chathurani Gunawardene (SL) made Women's ODI debut

=== 2nd ODI ===
ICC Women's Championship
15 May
09:50 SLST
(UTC+05:30)
Scorecard

West Indies; 124 (42.3 overs)	v	Sri Lanka; 127/4 (39.2 overs)
Stafanie Taylor 43 (70); Shashikala Siriwardene 4/30 (9.3 overs)		Shashikala Siriwardene 42* (72); Anisa Mohammed 1/22 (10 overs)

Sri Lanka Women won by 6 wickets
R Premadasa Stadium, Colombo
Umpires: Ruchira Palliyaguruge (SL) and Raveendra Wimalasiri (SL)
Player of the match: Shashikala Siriwardene (Sri Lanka Women)

- West Indies Women won the toss and chose to bat
- ICC Women's Championship points: Sri Lanka Women 2, West Indies Women 0

=== 3rd ODI ===
ICC Women's Championship
18 May
09:50 SLST
(UTC+05:30)
Scorecard

West Indies; 215/3 (50 overs)	v	Sri Lanka; 170/8 (40.2 overs)
Stefanie Taylor 86* (112); Sugandika Kumari 3/48 (10 overs)		Nipuni Hansika 50* (71); Afy Fletcher 2/25 (9 overs)

West Indies Women won by 18 runs (DLS method)
R Premadasa Stadium, Colombo
Umpires: Ranmore Martinesz (SL) and Ruchira Palliyaguruge (SL)
Player of the match: Stefanie Taylor (West Indies Women)

- West Indies Women won the toss, chose to bat.
- Rain stopped play when Sri Lanka Women were 99/4 off 24.4 overs
- Revised target for Sri Lanka Women was 209 off 46 overs
- ICC Women's Championship points: Sri Lanka Women 0, West Indies Women 2

=== 4th ODI ===
ICC Women's Championship
20 May
09:50 SLST
(UTC+05:30)
Scorecard

West Indies; 156 (47.3 overs)	v	Sri Lanka; 125 (45.2 overs)
Britney Cooper 46 (65); Inoka Ranaweera 3/17 (10 overs)		Eshani Kaushalya 30 (50); Hayley Matthews 3/7 (3.2 overs)

West Indies Women won by 31 runs
R Premadasa Stadium, Colombo
Umpires: Ranmore Martinesz (SL) and Raveendra Wimalasiri (SL)
Player of the match: Britney Cooper (West Indies Women)

- West Indies Women won the toss and chose to bat
- ICC Women's Championship points: Sri Lanka Women 0, West Indies Women 2

== T20I series ==
=== 1st T20I ===
23 May
10:00 SLST
(UTC+05:30)
Scorecard

West Indies; 109/6 (20 overs)	v	Sri Lanka; 88/6 (15.2 overs)
Stefanie Taylor 40 (41); Sripali Weerakkody 2/13 (3 overs)		Dilani Manodara 28 (21); Anisa Mohammed 2/15 (3.2 overs)

Sri Lanka Women won by 5 runs (DLS method)
R Premadasa Stadium, Colombo
Umpires: Pradeep Udawatta (SL) and Raveendra Wimalasiri (SL)
Player of the match: Sripali Weerakkody (SL)

- Sri Lanka Women won the toss and chose to field
- Rain stopped play when Sri Lanka women were 88/6.

=== 2nd T20I ===
25 May
10:00 SLST
(UTC+05:30)
Scorecard

Sri Lanka; 124/5 (20 overs)	v	West Indies; 125/2 (18.5 overs)
Dilani Manodara 30 (34); Stefanie Taylor 2/20 (3.5 overs)		Stefanie Taylor 59* (49); Udeshika Prabodhani 1/25 (3.5 overs)

West Indies Women won by 8 wickets
R Premadasa Stadium, Colombo
Umpires: Rohitha Kottahachchi (SL) and Ranmore Martinesz (SL)
Player of the match: Stafanie Taylor (WIN)

- Sri Lanka Women won the toss and chose to bat

=== 3rd T20I ===
26 May
14:00 SLST
(UTC+05:30)
Scorecard

Sri Lanka; 74/9 (20 overs)	v	West Indies; 75/1 (11.2 overs)
Chamari Atapattu 43 (48); Hayley Matthews 4/10 (4 overs)		Stefanie Taylor 38 (35); Inoka Ranaweera 1/7 (1.2 overs)

West Indies Women won by 9 wickets
R Premadasa Stadium, Colombo
Umpires: Rohitha Kottahachchi (SL) and Raveendra Wimalasiri (SL)
Player of the match: Hayley Matthews (WIN)

- West Indies Women won the toss and chose to field
