= England women's cricket team in Sri Lanka in 2016–17 =

International cricket tour

| | Sri Lanka women | England women |
- Dates: 9 – 17 November 2016
| Captains | Inoka Ranaweera | Heather Knight (1st, 2nd & 4th WODI); Danielle Hazell (3rd WODI) |

One Day International series
- Results: England women won the 4-match series 4–0
| Most runs | Nipuni Hansika (93) | Nat Sciver (185) |
| Most wickets | Inoka Ranaweera (8) | Danielle Hazell (9) |

England women's cricket team toured Sri Lanka in November 2016. The tour consisted of a series of four One Day Internationals, in which the final three were part of the 2014–16 ICC Women's Championship. England women won the series 4–0.

== Squads ==
| Sri Lanka | England |
|---|---|
| Inoka Ranaweera (c); Prasadani Weerakkody (vc); Nilakshi de Silva; Nipuni Hansika; Chamari Athapaththu; Ama Kanchana; Hansima Karunaratne; Achini Kulasuriya; Sugandika Kumari; Chamari Polgampola; Hasini Perera; Oshadi Ranasinghe; Dilani Manodara; Sripali Weerakkody; Inoshi Priyadharshani; Lasanthi Madushani; Anushka Sanjeewani; Malsha Shehani | Heather Knight (c for 1st, 2nd & 4th WODI); Danielle Hazell (c for 3rd WODI); Tammy Beaumont; Katherine Brunt; Georgia Elwiss; Jenny Gunn; Alex Hartley; Amy Jones; Beth Langston; Laura Marsh; Nat Sciver; Lauren Winfield; Fran Wilson; Danni Wyatt |

== ODI series ==
=== 1st ODI ===
9 November 2016
Scorecard

| Sri Lanka; 168/7 (50 overs) | v | England; 171/2 (29.3 overs) |
| Dilani Manodara 27 (46); Heather Knight 2/29 (8 overs) | | Nat Sciver 47* (40); Chamari Athapaththu 1/23 (7 overs) |

England Women won by 8 wickets
Sinhalese Sports Club Ground, Colombo
Umpires: Rohitha Kottahachchi (SL) and Pradeep Udawatta (SL)

- Sri Lanka Women won the toss and elected to bat.
- Beth Langston (England Women) made her ODI debut.

=== 2nd ODI ===
ICC Women's Championship
12 November 2016
Scorecard

| England; 295 (50 overs) | v | Sri Lanka; 173 (48.5 overs) |
| Heather Knight 53 (58); Inoka Ranaweera 3/48 (10 overs) | | Hasini Perera 35 (90); Danielle Hazell 3/38 (10 overs) |

England Women won by 122 runs
R. Premadasa Stadium, Colombo
Umpires: Hemantha Boteju (SL) and Lyndon Hannibal (SL)

- Sri Lanka Women won the toss and elected to field.
- Play was suspended after 10.3 overs of England Women's innings due to rain but no overs were lost.
- ICC Women's Championship points: England Women 2, Sri Lanka Women 0.
- By winning this match, England Women qualified for the 2017 Women's Cricket World Cup.

=== 3rd ODI ===
ICC Women's Championship
15 November 2016
Scorecard

| Sri Lanka; 161 (49.4 overs) | v | England; 162/5 (29.3 overs) |
| Nipuni Hansika 29 (66); Alex Hartley 2/23 (6 overs) | | Tammy Beaumont 78 (79); Oshadi Ranasinghe 2/26 (6 overs) |

England Women won by 5 wickets
R. Premadasa Stadium, Colombo
Umpires: Deepal Gunawardene (SL) and Raveendra Wimalasiri (SL)

- Sri Lanka Women won the toss and elected to bat.
- This was Danielle Hazell's first match as England Women's captain.
- ICC Women's Championship points: England Women 2, Sri Lanka Women 0.

=== 4th ODI ===
ICC Women's Championship
17–18 November 2016
Scorecard

| England; 240/9 (50 overs) | v | Sri Lanka; 78 (33.1 overs) |
| Nat Sciver 77 (74); Inoshi Priyadharshani 3/28 (10 overs) | | Prasadani Weerakkody 32 (67); Laura Marsh 4/21 (10 overs) |

England Women won by 162 runs
R. Premadasa Stadium, Colombo
Umpires: Nilan De Silva (SL) and Ruchira Palliyaguruge (SL)

- England Women won the toss and elected to bat.
- Rain stopped play after England Women's innings; no further play was possible on 17 November. Play resumed on 18 November.
- Nat Sciver and Danielle Hazell's 104-run partnership was the highest by England Women for the seventh wicket and equalled the overall highest for the seventh wicket in Women's One Day International cricket.
- Laura Marsh (Eng) took her 100th WODI wicket.
- ICC Women's Championship points: England Women 2, Sri Lanka Women 0.
