= South Africa women's cricket team in Australia in 2016–17 =

International cricket tour

	Australia women	South Africa women
- Dates: 13 – 29 November 2016
Captains	Meg Lanning	Dane van Niekerk

One Day International series
- Results: Australia women won the 5-match series 4–0
Most runs	Ellyse Perry (313)	Lizelle Lee (197)
Most wickets	Ellyse Perry (7)	Suné Luus (10)

South Africa women's cricket team toured Australia in November 2016. The tour consisted of a series of five One Day Internationals, with the first three being part of the 2014–16 ICC Women's Championship. Australia won the series 4–0 with the fourth match of the series ending in a tie.

== Squads ==
Australia	South Africa
Meg Lanning (c); Alex Blackwell (vc); ~~Kristen Beams~~; Nicole Bolton; Rene Farrell; Holly Ferling; Grace Harris; Alyssa Healy; Jess Jonassen; Beth Mooney; Ellyse Perry; Megan Schutt; Elyse Villani	Dane van Niekerk (c); Anneke Bosch; Moseline Daniels; Dinesha Devnarain; Mignon du Preez; Lara Goodall; Sinalo Jafta; Marizanne Kapp; Ayabonga Khaka; Odine Kirsten; Masabata Klaas; Lizelle Lee; Suné Luus; Chloe Tryon

Kristen Beams was ruled out of the last two matches of the series after she broke her little finger in her right hand in the third match.

== Practice match: Australia Governor-General's XI v South Africa Women ==
13 November 2016
Scorecard

South Africa; 7/203 (50 overs)	v	Australia Governor-General's XI; 8/204 (48.1 overs)
Suné Luus 55 (106); Amanda-Jade Wellington 2/25 (9 overs)		Beth Mooney 95 (128); Odine Kirsten 2/38 (10 overs)

Australia Governor-General's XI won by 2 wickets
Manuka Oval, Canberra
Umpires: Donovan Koch (Aus) and Claire Polosak (Aus)

- South Africa Women and elected to bat.

== ODI series ==
=== 1st ODI ===
ICC Women's Championship
18 November 2016 (D/N)
Scorecard

South Africa; 226/5 (50 overs)	v	Australia; 230/8 (49.5 overs)
Suné Luus 52 (90); Ellyse Perry 2/33 (8 overs)		Ellyse Perry 93* (107); Suné Luus 3/52 (7 overs)

Australia Women won by 2 wickets
Manuka Oval, Canberra
Umpires: Greg Davidson (Aus) and Geoff Joshua (Aus)
Player of the match: Ellyse Perry (Aus)

- South Africa Women won the toss and elected to bat.
- Anneke Bosch (SA) made her WODI debut.
- ICC Women's Championship points: Australia Women 2, South Africa Women 0.

=== 2nd ODI ===
ICC Women's Championship
20 November 2016 (D/N)
Scorecard

Australia; 278/4 (50 overs)	v	South Africa; 119/5 (31.2 overs)
Meg Lanning 134 (122); Ayabonga Khaka 3/55 (10 overs)		Suné Luus 60* (91); Ellyse Perry 1/15 (5 overs)

Australia Women by 66 runs (DLS method)
Manuka Oval, Canberra
Umpires: Geoff Joshua (Aus) and Claire Polosak (Aus)
Player of the match: Meg Lanning (Aus)

- Australia Women won the toss and elected to bat.
- A rain delay in South Africa's innings set them a revised target of 241 runs in 38 overs. A second rain delay after 31.2 overs meant no further play was possible, and the target was revised to 186 by the Duckworth–Lewis–Stern method.
- ICC Women's Championship points: Australia Women 2, South Africa Women 0.

=== 3rd ODI ===
ICC Women's Championship
23 November 2016 (D/N)
Scorecard

South Africa; 173/8 (32 overs)	v	Australia; 174/1 (27.1 overs)
Lizelle Lee 102 (89); Grace Harris 3/31 (7 overs)		Meg Lanning 80* (75); Ayabonga Khaka 1/41 (5 overs)

Australia Women won by 9 wickets
North Sydney Oval, Sydney
Umpires: Greg Davidson (Aus) and Claire Polosak (Aus)
Player of the match: Lizelle Lee (SA)

- South Africa Women won the toss and elected to bat.
- Rain delayed the start with the match being reduced to 32 overs per side.
- Lizelle Lee (SA) scored her first century in a WODI.
- ICC Women's Championship points: Australia Women 2, South Africa Women 0.

=== 4th ODI ===
27 November 2016 (D/N)
Scorecard

Australia; 242 (49.5 overs)	v	South Africa; 242 (50 overs)
Ellyse Perry 69 (99); Suné Luus 4/37 (7.5 overs)		Dane van Niekerk 81 (97); Jess Jonassen 3/37 (9 overs)

Match tied
International Sports Stadium, Coffs Harbour
Umpires: Phillip Gillespie (Aus) and John Ward (Aus)
Player of the match: Dane van Niekerk (SA)

- Australia Women won the toss and elected to bat.
- Tahlia McGrath and Amanda-Jade Wellington (Aus) both made their WODI debuts.
- This was the fifth tied game in WODIs.

=== 5th ODI ===
29 November 2016 (D/N)
Scorecard

Australia; 260/9 (50 overs)	v	South Africa; 217 (48.3 overs)
Ellyse Perry 56 (56); Moseline Daniels 3/53 (9 overs)		Lizelle Lee 44 (43); Ellyse Perry 3/52 (7 overs)

Australia Women won by 43 runs
International Sports Stadium, Coffs Harbour
Umpires: Phillip Gillespie (Aus) and John Ward (Aus)
Player of the match: Ellyse Perry (Aus)

- South Africa Women won the toss and elected to field.
