= Australia women's cricket team in Sri Lanka in 2016–17 =

International cricket tour

Australia women's tour of Sri Lanka in 2016–17
	Sri Lanka women	Australia women
- Dates: 15 – 27 September 2016
Captains	Chamari Athapaththu	Meg Lanning

One Day International series
- Results: Australia women won the 4-match series 4–0
Most runs	Chamari Polgampola (91)	Nicole Bolton (231)
Most wickets	Chamari Athapaththu (6)	Kristen Beams (13)

Twenty20 International series
- Results: Australia women won the 1-match series 1–0
Most runs	Lasanthi Madushani (17)	Elyse Villani (34)
Most wickets		Kristen Beams (3)

Australia women's cricket team toured Sri Lanka in September 2016. The tour consisted of a series of four One Day Internationals (ODIs) and one Twenty20 International (T20I). Three of the four WODIs were part of the ongoing 2014–16 ICC Women's Championship. Australia won the ODI series 4–0 and the one-off T20I match by 10 wickets. Australia's margin of victory in the T20I was the largest ever, by balls remaining, in women's T20 cricket history, with 71 balls to spare.

== Squads ==
Sri Lanka	Australia
Chamari Athapaththu (c); Prasadani Weerakkody; Dilani Manodara; Nipuni Hansika; Chamari Polgampola; Eshani Lokusuriyage; Udeshika Prabodhani; Inoka Ranaweera; Sugandika Kumari; Achini Kulasuriya; Inoshi Priyadharshani; Imalka Mendis; Ama Kanchana; Harshitha Samarawickrama	Meg Lanning (c); Alex Blackwell (v/c); Kristen Beams; Nicole Bolton; Rene Farrell; Holly Ferling; Grace Harris; Alyssa Healy (wk); Jess Jonassen; Beth Mooney; Erin Osborne; Ellyse Perry; Megan Schutt; Elyse Villani

== ODI series ==
=== 1st ODI ===
ICC Women's Championship
18 September 2016
Scorecard

Sri Lanka; 76 (24.5 overs)	v	Australia; 79/6 (15.4 overs)
Inoka Ranaweera 32* (43); Holly Ferling 3/4 (4 overs)		Meg Lanning 27 (21); Inoka Ranaweera 3/20 (4 overs)

Australia Women won by 4 wickets
Rangiri Dambulla International Stadium, Dambulla
Umpires: Ravindra Kottahachchi (SL) and Prageeth Rambukwella (SL)

- Sri Lanka Women won the toss and elected to bat.
- Inoshi Priyadharshani and Imalka Mendis (Sri Lanka Women) both made their ODI debuts.
- ICC Women's Championship points: Sri Lanka Women 0, Australia Women 2
- By winning this match, Australia Women became the first team to qualify for the 2017 Women's Cricket World Cup.

=== 2nd ODI ===
ICC Women's Championship
20 September 2016
Scorecard

Australia; 254/8 (50 overs)	v	Sri Lanka; 176/9 (50 overs)
Nicole Bolton 64 (88); Chamari Athapaththu 3/31 (10 overs)		Chamari Polgampola 68 (136); Kristen Beams 4/15 (10 overs)

Australia Women won by 78 runs
Rangiri Dambulla International Stadium, Dambulla
Umpires: Nilan De Silva (SL) and Deepal Gunawardene (SL)

- Australia Women won the toss and elected to bat.
- Harshitha Samarawickrama (Sri Lanka Women) made her ODI debut.
- ICC Women's Championship points: Sri Lanka Women 0, Australia Women 2

=== 3rd ODI ===
ICC Women's Championship
23 September 2016
9:50
Scorecard

Sri Lanka; 102 (36.5)	v	Australia; 104/1 (27.3 overs)
Prasadani Weerakkody 31 (37); Jess Jonassen 3/1 (4 overs)		Elyse Villani 48* (85); Inoka Ranaweera 1/27 (6 overs)

Australia by 9 wickets
R. Premadasa Stadium, Colombo
Umpires: Ruchira Palliyaguruge (SL) and Raveendra Wimalasiri (SL)

- Australia Women won the toss and elected to field.
- ICC Women's Championship points: Sri Lanka Women 0, Australia Women 2

=== 4th ODI ===
25 September 2016
9:50
Scorecard

Australia; 268/3 (50 overs)	v	Sri Lanka; 131 (45.4 overs)
Nicole Bolton 113 (146); Chamari Athapaththu 2/48 (10 overs)		Prasadani Weerakkody 33 (57); Kristen Beams 4/26 (10 overs)

Australia Women won by 137 runs
R. Premadasa Stadium, Colombo
Umpires: Hemantha Boteju (SL) and Raveendra Wimalasiri (SL)

- Australia Women won the toss and elected to bat.

== T20I Series ==
=== Only T20I ===
27 September 2016
Scorecard

Sri Lanka; 59/8 (20 overs)	v	Australia; 63/0 (8.1 overs)
Lasanthi Madushani 17 (25); Kristen Beams 3/11 (4 overs)		Elyse Villani 34* (25)

Australia Women won by 10 wickets
Sinhalese Sports Club Ground, Colombo
Umpires: Hemantha Boteju (SL) and Deepal Gunawardene (SL)
Player of the match: Kristen Beams (Aus)

- Australia Women won the toss and elected to field.
- This was the largest victory by balls remaining (71) in women's T20 cricket.
