= New Zealand women's cricket team in South Africa in 2016–17 =

International cricket tour

New Zealand women's tour of South Africa in 2016–17
	South Africa women	New Zealand women
- Dates: 6 – 24 October 2016
Captains	Dane van Niekerk	Suzie Bates

One Day International series
- Results: New Zealand women won the 7-match series 5–2
Most runs	Mignon du Preez (232)	Amy Satterthwaite (344)
Most wickets	Ayabonga Khaka (11)	Amy Satterthwaite (11)
- Player of the series: Amy Satterthwaite (New Zealand Women)

New Zealand women's cricket team toured South Africa in October 2016. The tour consisted of a series of seven One day internationals and a warm-up match. Three of the seven WODIs were part of the ongoing 2014–16 ICC Women's Championship.

The third match of the series was the 1,000th women's ODI match. New Zealand won the series 5–2.

== Squads ==
South Africa	New Zealand
Dane van Niekerk (c); Moseline Daniels; Dinesha Devnarain; Lara Goodall; Sinalo Jafta; Marizanne Kapp; Ayabonga Khaka; Odine Kirsten; Masabata Klaas; Lizelle Lee; Suné Luus; Mignon du Preez; Andrie Steyn; Chloe Tryon; Laura Wolvaardt	Suzie Bates (c); Erin Bermingham; Samantha Curtis; Sophie Devine; Maddy Green; Holly Huddleston; Leigh Kasperek; Katey Martin; Thamsyn Newton; Morna Nielsen; Katie Perkins; Rachel Priest; Hannah Rowe; Amy Satterthwaite; Lea Tahuhu

== Tour match ==
=== One day: South Africa Emerging Players Women vs New Zealand Women ===
4 October
Scorecard

New Zealand Women; 298/6 (50 overs)	v	South Africa Emerging Players Women; 161/9 (50 overs)
Suzie Bates 72 (79); Moseline Daniels 2/41 (10 overs)		Elriesa Theunissen 27 (38); Lea Tahuhu 3/26 (7 overs)

New Zealand Women won by 137 runs
Senwes Park, Potchefstroom
Umpires: Allahudien Paleker (SA) and Brad White (SA)

- New Zealand Women won the toss and elected to bat.

== ODI series ==
=== 1st ODI ===
ICC Women's Championship
8 October
Scorecard

New Zealand; 127 (40.1 overs)	v	South Africa; 115 (42.2 overs)
Erin Bermingham 33 (53); Ayabonga Khaka 3/27 (7.1 overs)		Dane van Niekerk 37 (79); Amy Satterthwaite 4/13 (9 overs)

New Zealand Women won by 12 runs
Diamond Oval, Kimberley
Umpires: Allahudien Paleker (SA) and Brad White (SA)
Player of the match: Amy Satterthwaite (New Zealand Women)

- South Africa Women won the toss and elected to field.
- ICC Women's Championship points: South Africa Women 0, New Zealand Women 2

=== 2nd ODI ===
ICC Women's Championship
11 October
Scorecard

New Zealand; 222/8 (50 overs)	v	South Africa; 226/6 (49.1 overs)
Suzie Bates 66 (84); Marizanne Kapp 3/41 (9 overs)		Mignon du Preez 80 (112); Morna Nielsen 5/39 (10 overs)

South Africa Women won by 4 wickets
Diamond Oval, Kimberley
Umpires: Ryan Hendricks (SA) and Allahudien Paleker (SA)
Player of the match: Mignon du Preez (South Africa Women)

- South Africa Women won the toss and elected to field.
- This was South Africa's first win against New Zealand in a women's ODI.
- ICC Women's Championship points: South Africa Women 2, New Zealand Women 0

=== 3rd ODI ===
ICC Women's Championship
13 October
Scorecard

South Africa; 188/9 (50 overs)	v	New Zealand; 190/1 (33.1 overs)
Dane van Niekerk 78* (104); Holly Huddleston 5/25 (10 overs)		Amy Satterthwaite 89* (97); Ayabonga Khaka 1/31 (8 overs)

New Zealand Women won by 9 wickets
Diamond Oval, Kimberley
Umpires: Allahudien Paleker (SA) and Brad White (SA)
Player of the match: Holly Huddleston (New Zealand Women)

- South Africa Women won the toss and elected to bat.
- ICC Women's Championship points: South Africa Women 0, New Zealand Women 2

=== 4th ODI ===
17 October
Scorecard

South Africa; 194 (49 overs)	v	New Zealand; 196/2 (28.2 overs)
Dane van Niekerk 48* (62); Amy Satterthwaite 3/33 (8 overs)		Rachel Priest 86 (67); Marizanne Kapp 1/20 (3 overs)

New Zealand Women won by 8 wickets
Boland Park, Paarl
Umpires: Ryan Hendricks (SA) and Brad White (SA)
Player of the match: Amy Satterthwaite (NZ)

- New Zealand Women won the toss and elected to field.

=== 5th ODI ===
19 October
Scorecard

New Zealand; 208/8 (50 overs)	v	South Africa; 113 (35.5 overs)
Natalie Dodd 52 (107); Ayabonga Khaka 2/30 (9 overs)		Mignon du Preez 62 (90); Suzie Bates 3/17 (5 overs)

New Zealand Women won by 95 runs
Boland Park, Paarl
Umpires: Allahudien Paleker (SA) and Brad White (SA)
Player of the match: Natalie Dodd (New Zealand Women)

- New Zealand Women won the toss and elected to bat.

=== 6th ODI ===
22 October
Scorecard

New Zealand; 130 (33.3 overs)	v	South Africa; 131/5 (37.4 overs)
Katey Martin 65* (80); Masabata Klaas 3/32 (8 overs)		Mignon du Preez 44 (76); Holly Huddleston 2/13 (7 overs)

South Africa Women won by 5 wickets
Boland Park, Paarl
Umpires: Ryan Hendricks (SA) and Allahudien Paleker (SA)
Player of the match: Masabata Klaas (South Africa Women)

- South Africa Women won the toss and elected to field.
- Sinalo Jafta (South Africa Women) made her ODI debut.

=== 7th ODI ===
24 October
Scorecard

New Zealand; 273/7 (50 overs)	v	South Africa; 147 (45.5 overs)
Katey Martin 81 (72); Ayabonga Khaka 2/37 (10 overs)		Odine Kirsten 22* (52); Erin Bermingham 3/18 (10 overs)

New Zealand Women won by 126 runs
Boland Park, Paarl
Umpires: Allahudien Paleker (SA) and Brad White (SA)
Player of the match: Katey Martin (New Zealand Women)

- New Zealand Women won the toss and elected to bat.
