= India women's cricket team in Australia in 2015–16 =

India women's tour of Australia
	Australia women	India women
- Dates: 22 January 2016 – 7 February 2016
Captains	Meg Lanning	Mithali Raj

One Day International series
- Results: Australia women won the 3-match series 2–1
Most runs	Alex Blackwell (193)	Mithali Raj (170)
Most wickets	Ellyse Perry (9)	Shikha Pandey (8)

Twenty20 International series
- Results: India women won the 3-match series 2–1
Most runs	Meg Lanning (87)	Harmanpreet Kaur (70)
Most wickets	Ellyse Perry (4)	Jhulan Goswami (4); Rajeshwari Gayakwad (4)
- Player of the series: Jhulan Goswami (Ind)

The India women's national cricket team toured Australia in January 2016 together with the Indian men cricket team. The tour included a series of three ODIs and three T20Is. The ODIs were part of the ICC Women's Championship.

== Squads ==
ODIs		T20Is	
Australia	India	Australia	India
Meg Lanning (c); Alex Blackwell (vc); Kristen Beams; Nicole Bolton; Sarah Coyte; Rene Farrell; Holly Ferling; Grace Harris; Alyssa Healy (wk); Jess Jonassen; Beth Mooney; Ellyse Perry; Megan Schutt	Mithali Raj (c); Jhulan Goswami (vc); Ekta Bisht; Rajeshwari Gayakwad; Ravi Kalpana (wk); Thirush Kamini; Harmanpreet Kaur; Veda Krishnamurthy; Smriti Mandhana; Niranjana Nagarajan; Shikha Pandey; Poonam Yadav; Sneh Rana; Poonam Raut; Sushma Verma (wk)	Meg Lanning (c); Alex Blackwell (vc); Lauren Cheatle; Sarah Coyte; Rene Farrell; Holly Ferling; Grace Harris; Alyssa Healy (wk); Jess Jonassen; Beth Mooney; Ellyse Perry; Megan Schutt; Naomi Stalenberg	Mithali Raj (c); Jhulan Goswami (vc); Ekta Bisht; Rajeshwari Gayakwad; Thirush Kamini; Harmanpreet Kaur; Veda Krishnamurthy; Smriti Mandhana; Anuja Patil; Poonam Yadav; Deepti Sharma; Vellaswamy Vanitha; Sushma Verma (wk)

== Tour match ==
22 January
14:00 AEDT (UTC+11)
Scorecard

Australia Governor-General XI; 19/1 (4 overs)	v	India
Beth Mooney 9* (23)

No result
Drummoyne Oval, Sydney
Umpires: Claire Polosak (Aus) and David Taylor (Aus)

- India Women won the toss and elected to field.
- No further play was possible due to rain.

== T20I series ==
=== 1st T20I ===
26 January
14:00 ACDT (UTC+10:30)
Scorecard

Australia; 140/5 (20 overs)	v	India; 141/5 (18.4 overs)
Alyssa Healy 41* (15); Poonam Yadav 2/26 (4 overs)		Harmanpreet Kaur 46 (31); Megan Schutt 2/23 (4 overs)

India Women won by 5 wickets
Adelaide Oval, Adelaide
Umpires: Geoff Joshua (Aus) and Sam Nogajski (Aus)
Player of the match: Harmanpreet Kaur (Ind)

- India women won the toss and elected to field.
- Beth Mooney and Naomi Stalenberg (Aus) both made their debut in WT20I.
- This was India's highest successful run chase in a T20I.

=== 2nd T20I ===
29 January
14:30 AEDT (UTC+11)
Scorecard

Australia; 125/8 (18 overs)	v	India; 69/0 (9.1 overs)
Meg Lanning 49 (39); Jhulan Goswami 2/16 (4 overs)		Mithali Raj 37* (32)

India won by 10 wickets (DLS method)
Melbourne Cricket Ground, Melbourne
Umpires: Gerard Abood (Aus) and Geoff Joshua (Aus)
Player of the match: Jhulan Goswami (Ind)

- India women won the toss and elected to field.
- Rain reduced Australia Women's innings to 18 overs and India Women were set a target of 66 runs in 10 overs.
- Lauren Cheatle (Aus) made her debut in WT20I.
- This was India Women's first bilateral series win in any formats against Australia Women.

=== 3rd T20I ===
31 January
14:30 AEDT (UTC+11)
Scorecard

Australia; 5/136 (20 overs)	v	India; 8/121 (20 overs)
Ellyse Perry 55* (41); Rajeshwari Gayakwad 2/36 (4 overs)		Vellaswamy Vanitha 28 (25); Ellyse Perry 4/12 (4 overs)

Australia won by 15 runs
Sydney Cricket Ground, Sydney
Umpires: Gerard Abood (Aus) and Sam Nogajski (Aus)
Player of the match: Ellyse Perry (Aus)

- India women won the toss and elected to field.
- Deepti Sharma (Ind) made her debut in WT20I.

== ODI Series ==
=== 1st ODI ===
ICC Women's Championship
2 February
10:00 AEDT (UTC+11)
Scorecard

Australia; 276/6 (50 overs)	v	India; 175 (46.5 overs)
Alex Blackwell 114 (112); Shikha Pandey 3/32 (10 overs)		Harmanpreet Kaur 42 (72); Ellyse Perry 4/45 (10 overs)

Australia Women won by 101 runs
Manuka Oval, Canberra
Umpires: Sam Nogajski (Aus) and Tony Wilds (Aus)
Player of the match: Alex Blackwell (Aus)

- Australia Women won the toss and elected to bat.
- Grace Harris (Aus) made her WODI debut.
- ICC Women's Championship points: Australia Women 2, India Women 0

=== 2nd ODI ===
ICC Women's Championship
5 February
10:00 AEDT (UTC+11)
Scorecard

India; 252/8 (50 overs)	v	Australia; 253/4 (46.4 overs)
Smriti Mandhana 102 (109); Ellyse Perry 3/54 (10 overs)		Nicole Bolton 77 (74); Rajeshwari Gayakwad 2/42 (7.4 overs)

Australia won by 6 wickets
Bellerive Oval, Hobart
Umpires: Michael Graham-Smith (Aus) and Damien Mealey (Aus)
Player of the match: Smriti Mandhana (Ind)

- India won the toss and elected to bat.
- ICC Women's Championship points: Australia Women 2, India Women 0

=== 3rd ODI ===
ICC Women's Championship
7 February
10:00 AEDT (UTC+11)
Scorecard

Australia; 231/7 (50 overs)	v	India; 234/5 (47 overs)
Alex Blackwell 60 (64); Shikha Pandey 3/50 (10 overs)		Mithali Raj 89 (113); Ellyse Perry 2/50 (10 overs)

India Women won by 5 wickets
Bellerive Oval, Hobart
Umpires: Michael Graham-Smith (Aus) and Tony Wilds (Aus)
Player of the match: Mithali Raj (Ind)

- Australia Women won the toss and elected to bat.
- Ellyse Perry (Aus) took her 100th ODI wicket.
- ICC Women's Championship points: Australia Women 0, India Women 2
