= New Zealand women's cricket team in the West Indies in 2014–15 =

International cricket tour

New Zealand Women's cricket team in the West Indies 2014–15
	West Indies women	New Zealand women
- Dates: 10 September – 27 September 2014
Captains	Merissa Aguilleira	Suzie Bates

One Day International series
- Results: West Indies women won the 4-match series 4–0
Most runs	Deandra Dottin (176)	Suzie Bates (119)
Most wickets	Anisa Mohammed (12)	Georgia Guy (7)
- Player of the series: Anisa Mohammed (WI Women)

Twenty20 International series
- Results: New Zealand women won the 3-match series 2–1
Most runs	Deandra Dottin (95)	Rachel Priest (100)
Most wickets	Deandra Dottin (4)	Amy Satterthwaite (4)
- Player of the series: Deandra Dottin (WI Women)

The New Zealand women' cricket team toured the West Indian Island of St Kitts and St Vincent from 10 to 27 September 2014. The tour consisted of four One Day International matches of ICC Women's Championship and three Twenty20 International matches. The first three ODI matches were part of the 2014–16 ICC Women's Championship.

== Squads ==
ODIs		T20Is	
West Indies	New Zealand	West Indies	New Zealand
Merissa Aguilleira (C/wk); Stafanie Taylor (vc); Shemaine Campbelle; Britney Cooper; Shanel Daley; Deandra Dottin; Kycia Knight; Hayley Matthews; Natasha McLean; Anisa Mohammed; Shaquana Quintyne; Tremayne Smartt; Shakera Selman	Suzie Bates (C); Samantha Curtis; Sara McGlashan; Sophie Devine; Katie Perkins; Amy Satterthwaite; Rachel Priest; Felicity Leydon-Davis; Morna Nielsen; Holly Huddleston; Lea Tahuhu; Hayley Jensen; Maddy Green; Georgia Guy	Merissa Aguilleira (C/wk); Stafanie Taylor (vc); Shemaine Campbelle; Shamilia Connell; Britney Cooper; Shanel Daley; Deandra Dottin; Kycia Knight (wk); Hayley Matthews; Anisa Mohammed; Shaquana Quintyne; Shakera Selman; Tremayne Smartt	Suzie Bates (C); Samantha Curtis; Sara McGlashan; Sophie Devine; Katie Perkins; Amy Satterthwaite; Rachel Priest; Felicity Leydon-Davis; Morna Nielsen; Holly Huddleston; Lea Tahuhu; Hayley Jensen; Maddy Green; Georgia Guy

== ODI Series ==
=== 1st ODI ===
ICC Women's Championship
12 September 2014
09:30
Scorecard

West Indies; 145/5 (40.1 overs)	v	New Zealand; 142 (44.1 overs)
Deandra Dottin 60 (77); Suzie Bates 2/17 (4 overs)		KT Perkins 36 (58); Tremayne Smartt 5/24 (10 overs)

West Indies Women won by 5 wickets
Warner Park Sporting Complex, Basseterre
Umpires: Gregory Brathwaite (BAR) and Joel Wilson (T&T)
Player of the match: Tremayne Smartt (WI Women)

- New Zealand Women won the toss and chose to bat
- Georgia Guy (NZ) made her ODI debut
- ICC Women's Championship points: West Indies 2, New Zealand Women 0

=== 2nd ODI ===
ICC Women's Championship
14 September 2014
09:30
Scorecard

West Indies; 246/5 (50.0 overs)	v	New Zealand; 181 (45.3 overs)
Deandra Dottin 82 (99); Suzie Bates 2/40 (6 overs)		Sophie Devine 89 (93); Anisa Mohammed 4/32 (10 overs)

West Indies Women won by 65 runs
Warner Park Sporting Complex, Basseterre
Umpires: Gregory Brathwaite and Joel Wilson
Player of the match: Deandra Dottin (WI Women)

- West Indies Women won the toss and chose to bat
- ICC Women's Championship points: West Indies 2, New Zealand Women 0

=== 3rd ODI ===
ICC Women's Championship
17 September 2014
09:30
Scorecard

New Zealand; 69 (32.2 overs)	v	West Indies; 74/2 (17.2 overs)
Rachel Priest 19 (56); Shakera Selman 5/15 (10 overs)		Stafanie Taylor 23* (29); Georgia Guy 1/21 (5 overs)

West Indies Women won by 8 wickets
Warner Park Sporting Complex, Basseterre
Umpires: Gregory Brathwaite and Joel Wilson
Player of the match: Shakera Selman (WI Women)

- New Zealand Women won the toss and elected to bat
- ICC Women's Championship points: West Indies 2, New Zealand Women 0

=== 4th ODI ===
19 September 2014
09:30
Scorecard

West Indies; 214/8 (50 overs)	v	New Zealand; 210 (49.4 overs)
Stafanie Taylor 66 (84); Georgia Guy 3/23 (10 overs)		Rachel Priest 74 (137); Anisa Mohammed 4/41 (10 overs)

West Indies Women won by 4 runs
Warner Park Sporting Complex, Basseterre
Umpires: Gregory Brathwaite and Joel Wilson
Player of the match: Anisa Mohammed (WI Women)

- New Zealand Women won the toss and elected to field

== T20I series ==
=== 1st T20I ===
23 September 2014
09:30
Scorecard

West Indies; 92/6 (20 overs)	v	New Zealand; 94/3 (17.5 overs)
Stafanie Taylor 43 (48); Morna Nielsen 3/10 (4 overs)		Rachel Priest 40 (36); Anisa Mohammed 1/17 (4 overs)

New Zealand Women won by 7 wickets
Arnos Vale Ground, Kingstown
Umpires: Nigel Duguid and Peter Nero
Player of the match: Rachel Priest (NZ Women)

- New Zealand Women won the toss and elected to field

=== 2nd T20I ===
25 September 2014
09:30
Scorecard

New Zealand; 101/5 (20 overs)	v	West Indies; 102/3 (17.1 overs)
Rachel Priest 31 (39); Deandra Dottin 3/9 (4 overs)		Deandra Dottin 40 (42); Holly Huddleston 1/11 (2 overs)

West Indies Women won by 7 wickets
Arnos Vale Ground, Kingstown
Umpires: Nigel Duguid and Peter Nero
Player of the match: Deandra Dottin (WI Women)

- West Indies Women won the toss and elected to field

=== 3rd T20I ===
27 September 2014
09:30
Scorecard

West Indies; 111/8 (20 overs)	v	New Zealand; 111/4 (20 overs)
Deandra Dottin 54 (46); Amy Satterthwaite 4/24 (4 overs)		Katie Perkins 31* (20); Tremayne Smartt 1/13 (3 overs)

Match tied (New Zealand Women won the one-over eliminator)
Arnos Vale Ground, Kingstown
Umpires: Nigel Duguid and Peter Nero
Player of the match: Amy Satterthwaite (NZ Women)

- New Zealand Women won the toss and elected to bat
