= 2014–2016 ICC Women's Championship =

Cricket tournament

- Administrator: International Cricket Council
- Cricket format: One Day International
- Tournament format: Round robin
- Host: Various
- Champions: Australia (1st title)
- Runners-up: England
- Most runs: (Australia) Meg Lanning (1,232)
- Most wickets: (Australia) Jess Jonassen (31)

The 2014–2016 ICC Women's Championship was the first edition of the ICC Women's Championship, a women's One Day International cricket (WODI) competition contested by eight teams. The top four teams at the conclusion of the tournament (Australia, England, New Zealand and West Indies) gained automatically qualification for the 2017 World Cup. The bottom four teams (India, South Africa, Pakistan and Sri Lanka) faced six qualifying teams in the 2017 World Cup Qualifier for the remaining four places at the World Cup. When four or more WODIs were played in a series, only three pre-selected matches were included in the championship. The second edition of the competition started in October 2017.

== Teams ==
The following teams played in the tournament:

- Australia
- England
- India
- New Zealand
- Pakistan
- South Africa
- Sri Lanka
- West Indies

== Results ==
The breakdown of results was as follows. During each round, each team played against their opponent three times.

Round	Window	Home team	Away team	Date	Result
1	June – October 2014	Australia	Pakistan	21 August 2014	3–0
1	June – October 2014	England	India	21 August 2014	2–0
1	June – October 2014	West Indies	New Zealand	12 September 2014	3–0
1	June – October 2014	Sri Lanka	South Africa	15 October 2014	1–1
2	November 2014 – February 2015	Australia	West Indies	11 November 2014	3–0
2	November 2014 – February 2015	India	South Africa	24 November 2014	1–2
2	November 2014 – February 2015	Pakistan	Sri Lanka	9 January 2015	3–0
2	November 2014 – February 2015	New Zealand	England	11 February 2015	2–1
3	March – August 2015	Pakistan	South Africa	13 March 2015	1–2
3	March – August 2015	Sri Lanka	West Indies	15 May 2015	1–2
3	March – August 2015	India	New Zealand	28 June 2015	1–2
3	March – August 2015	England	Australia	21 July 2015	1–2
4	October 2015 – February 2016	West Indies	Pakistan	18 October 2015	3–0
4	October 2015 – February 2016	New Zealand	Sri Lanka	3 November 2015	3–0
4	October 2015 – February 2016	Australia	India	2 February 2016	2–1
4	October 2015 – February 2016	South Africa	England	7 February 2016	1–2
5	February – July 2016	India	Sri Lanka	15 February 2016	3–0
5	February – July 2016	New Zealand	Australia	20 February 2016	1–2
5	February – July 2016	South Africa	West Indies	24 February 2016	1–2
5	February – July 2016	England	Pakistan	20 June 2016	3–0
6	August – October 2016	Sri Lanka	Australia	18 September 2016	0–3
6	August – October 2016	South Africa	New Zealand	8 October 2016	1–2
6	August – October 2016	West Indies	England	14 October 2016	1–2
6	August – October 2016	Pakistan	India	October 2016	3–0 (Note: The round six fixtures between Pakistan and India should have taken place by the end of October 2016. As of 9 November 2016, no decision was reached regarding the fixtures going ahead or not. On 23 November 2016 the ICC Technical Committee ruled that India's Women's team had forfeited all of the matches, with the points being awarded to Pakistan. Pakistan were awarded two points for each game, with India considered to have scored 0 runs in the 50 overs of each game, with their net run rate adjusted to reflect this.)
7	October – November 2016	India	West Indies	10 November 2016	3–0
7	October – November 2016	Sri Lanka	England	12 November 2016	0–3
7	October – November 2016	New Zealand	Pakistan	13 November 2016	3–0
7	October – November 2016	Australia	South Africa	18 November 2016	3–0

== Points table ==
Pos	Team	Pld	W	L	T	NR	Pts	NRR	Qualification
1	Australia	21	18	3	0	0	36	0.981	Advance to the 2017 Women's Cricket World Cup
2	England	21	14	6	0	1	29	1.047	Advance to the 2017 Women's Cricket World Cup
3	New Zealand	21	13	8	0	0	26	0.441	Advance to the 2017 Women's Cricket World Cup
4	West Indies	21	11	10	0	0	22	0.128	Advance to the 2017 Women's Cricket World Cup
5	India (Note: The Pakistan–India fixtures were awarded to Pakistan.)	21	9	11	0	1	19	−0.488	Advance to the 2017 Women's Cricket World Cup Qualifier
6	South Africa	21	8	12	0	1	17	−0.235	Advance to the 2017 Women's Cricket World Cup Qualifier
7	Pakistan	21	7	14	0	0	14	−1.126	Advance to the 2017 Women's Cricket World Cup Qualifier
8	Sri Lanka	21	2	18	0	1	5	−1.538	Advance to the 2017 Women's Cricket World Cup Qualifier

== Statistics ==
=== Most runs ===
Player	Team	Mat	Inns	Runs	Ave
Meg Lanning	Australia	21	21	1232	72.47
Ellyse Perry	Australia	17	16	985	89.54
Suzie Bates	New Zealand	20	20	978	54.33
Stafanie Taylor	West Indies	19	19	857	57.13
Nicole Bolton	Australia	20	20	817	45.38
Source: ESPNcricinfo

=== Most wickets ===
Player	Team	Mat	Inns	Wkts	Ave
Jess Jonassen	Australia	21	21	31	19.09
Heather Knight	England	19	18	29	19.34
Anisa Mohammed	West Indies	21	21	27	22.51
Rajeshwari Gayakwad	India	16	16	25	19.32
Kristen Beams	Australia	18	18	24	21.62
Source: ESPNcricinfo
