= 2016 English cricket season =

English cricket season

County Championship
- Champions: Middlesex
- Runners-up: Somerset
- Most runs: Keaton Jennings (1,548)
- Most wickets: Jeetan Patel (69)

Royal London One-Day Cup
- Champions: Warwickshire
- Runners-up: Surrey
- Most runs: Sam Hain (540)
- Most wickets: Matt Coles (24)

t20 Blast
- Champions: Northamptonshire Steelbacks
- Runners-up: Durham Jets
- Most runs: Michael Klinger (548)
- Most wickets: Benny Howell (24)

Women's Cricket Super League
- Champions: Southern Vipers
- Runners-up: Western Storm
- Most runs: Stafanie Taylor (289)
- Most wickets: Stafanie Taylor (11)

Women's County Championship
- Champions: Kent
- Runners-up: Sussex
- Most runs: Kirstie White (337)
- Most wickets: Samantha Betts (18)

Women's Twenty20 Cup
- Champions: Kent
- Runners-up: Warwickshire
- Most runs: Laura Newton (272)
- Most wickets: Nicole Richards (15)

PCA Player of the Year
- Ben Duckett

Wisden Cricketers of the Year
- Jonny Bairstow; Brendon McCullum; Steve Smith; Ben Stokes; Kane Williamson

The 2016 cricket season was the 117th in which the County Championship has been an official competition. The season began in March with a round of university matches, and continued until the conclusion of a round of County Championship matches in late September. Three major men's domestic competitions were contested: the 2016 County Championship, the 2016 Royal London One-Day Cup and the 2016 NatWest t20 Blast. Women's domestic cricket saw the launch of the Women's Cricket Super League, a new franchise competition, and the contesting of the Women's County Championship and Women's Twenty20 Cup.

During the season, two men's Test teams toured England. Sri Lanka competed early in the summer, with Pakistan also touring later in the year. Pakistan Women also toured, playing England in three WODIs and three WT20Is.

== Roll of honour ==
Test series

- England v Sri Lanka: 3 Tests - England won 2–0
- England v Pakistan: 4 Tests - Series drawn 2–2

ODI series

- England v Sri Lanka: 5 ODIs - England won 3–0
- England v Pakistan: 5 ODIs - England won 4–1

Twenty20 International series

- England v Sri Lanka: Only T20I - England won by 8 wickets
- England v Pakistan: Only T20I - Pakistan won by 9 wickets

WODI series

- England v Pakistan: 3 WODIs - England won 3–0

Women's Twenty20 International series

- England v Pakistan: 3 WT20Is - England won 3–0

County Championship

- Division One winners: Middlesex
- Division One runners-up: Somerset
- Division Two winners: Essex
- Relegated from Division One: Durham and Nottinghamshire
- Promoted from Division Two: Essex

Royal London One-Day Cup

- Winners: Warwickshire
- Runners-up: Surrey

NatWest t20 Blast

- Winners: Northamptonshire Steelbacks
- Runners-up: Durham Jets

Minor Counties Cricket Championship

- Winners: Berkshire
- Runners-up: Lincolnshire

MCCA Knockout Trophy

- Winners: Herefordshire
- Runners-up: Staffordshire

Women's County Championship

- Winners: Kent
- Runners-up: Sussex

Women's Twenty20 Cup

- Winners: Kent
- Runners-up: Warwickshire

Women's Cricket Super League

- Winners: Southern Vipers
- Runners-up: Western Storm

Wisden Cricketers of the Year (i.e., awarded in 2016 for the 2015 season)

- Jonny Bairstow, Brendon McCullum, Steve Smith, Ben Stokes, Kane Williamson

PCA Player of the Year

- Ben Duckett

== Women's County Championship ==
Kent won the 2016 Women's County Championship, the county's record seventh Championship title. The runners-up were Sussex.

== Women's Twenty20 Cup ==
Kent won the tournament, their third Twenty20 title.
