= England women's cricket team in New Zealand in 2014–15 =

International cricket tour

England women's cricket team in New Zealand in 2015
	New Zealand women	England women
- Dates: 11 February – 28 February 2015
Captains	Suzie Bates	Charlotte Edwards

One Day International series
- Results: England women won the 5-match series 3–2
Most runs	Rachel Priest (189)	Sarah Taylor (245)
Most wickets	Erin Bermingham (7)	Kate Cross (7)
- Player of the series: Sarah Taylor (Eng)

Twenty20 International series
- Results: England women won the 3-match series 2–1
Most runs	Sophie Devine (66)	Heather Knight (56)
Most wickets	Lea Tahuhu (3)	Heather Knight (5); Laura Marsh (5)
- Player of the series: Heather Knight (Eng)

The England women's cricket team toured New Zealand from 11 to 28 February 2015. The tour included five One Day Internationals. The first three matches were part of the 2014–16 ICC Women's Championship.

== ODI series ==
=== 1st ODI ===
ICC Women's Championship
11 February
Scorecard

New Zealand; 240/8 (50 overs)	v	England; 173/10 (45.2 overs)
Suzie Bates 106 (113); Heather Knight 4/47 (10 overs)		Anya Shrubsole 29 (19); Erin Bermingham 2/20 (10 overs)

New Zealand Women won by 67 runs
Bay Oval, Mount Maunganui
Umpires: Kathy Cross (NZL) and Phil Jones (NZL)
Player of the match: Suzie Bates (New Zealand Women)

- England Women won the toss and chose to field.
- Rebecca Grundy (Eng) made her ODI debut.
- ICC Women's Championship points: New Zealand Women 2, England Women 0

=== 2nd ODI ===
ICC Women's Championship
13 February
Scorecard

New Zealand; 104/10 (36.1 overs)	v	England; 194/10 (49.2 overs)
Anna Peterson 21 (30); Anya Shrubsole 4/36 (10 overs)		Charlotte Edwards 65 (100); Anna Peterson 4/25 (8.4 overs)

England Women won by 90 runs
Bay Oval, Mount Maunganui
Umpires: Kathy Cross (NZL) and Phil Jones (NZL)
Player of the match: Charlotte Edwards (England Women)

- England Women won the toss and chose to bat.
- ICC Women's Championship points: New Zealand Women 0, England Women 2

=== 3rd ODI ===
ICC Women's Championship
15 February
Scorecard

New Zealand; 219/1 (48.4 overs)	v	England; 217/9 (50 overs)
Rachel Priest 96* (139); Anya Shrubsole 1/52 (9 overs)		Heather Knight 79 (119); Erin Bermingham 3/35 (10 overs)

New Zealand Women won by 9 wickets
Bay Oval, Mount Maunganui
Umpires: Kathy Cross (NZL) and Tony Gillies (NZL)
Player of the match: Rachel Priest (New Zealand Women)

- England Women won the toss and chose to bat.
- ICC Women's Championship points: New Zealand Women 2, England Women 0

=== 4th ODI ===
26 February
Scorecard

New Zealand; 168/10 (50 overs)	v	England; 169/1 (32.1 overs)
Amy Satterthwaite 27 (45); Kate Cross 5/24 (10 overs)		Sarah Taylor 89* (104); Lea Tahuhu 1/24 (6 overs)

England Women won by 9 wickets
Bert Sutcliffe Oval, Lincoln
Umpires: Kathy Cross (NZL) and Derek Walker (NZL)
Player of the match: Kate Cross (England Women)

- England Women won the toss and chose to field.
- Hannah Rowe (NZ) made her ODI debut.

=== 5th ODI ===
28 February
Scorecard

New Zealand; 230/8 (50 overs)	v	England; 232/5 (45 overs)
Katie Perkins 70* (88); Rebecca Grundy 3/36 (10 overs)		Sarah Taylor 93 (99); Kate Broadmore 1/32 (6 overs)

England Women won by 5 wickets
Bert Sutcliffe Oval, Lincoln
Umpires: Kathy Cross (NZL) and Derek Walker (NZL)
Player of the match: Sarah Taylor (England Women)

- England Women won the toss and chose to field.

== T20I series ==
=== 1st T20I ===
19 February 2015
Scorecard

New Zealand; 60 (19.4 overs)	v	England; 61/2 (11.4 overs)
Erin Bermingham 20 (37); Anya Shrubsole 3/6 (3.4 overs)		Charlotte Edwards 32* (34); Erin Bermingham 1/12 (3 overs)

England Women won by 8 wickets
Cobham Oval, Whangārei
Umpires: Tony Gillies (NZL) and Barry Frost (NZL)
Player of the match: Heather Knight (England Women)

- New Zealand Women won the toss and elected to bat.

=== 2nd T20I ===
20 February 2015
Scorecard

England; 122/5 (20 overs)	v	New Zealand; 124/4 (19.2 overs)
Lauren Winfield-Hill 48 (59); Morna Nielsen 2/25 (4 overs)		Rachel Priest 41 (33); Laura Marsh 2/25 (3.2 overs)

New Zealand Women won by 6 wickets
Cobham Oval, Whangārei
Umpires: Tony Gillies (NZL) and Barry Frost (NZL)
Player of the match: Rachel Priest (New Zealand Women)

- England Women won the toss and elected to bat.

=== 3rd T20I ===
24 February 2015
Scorecard

New Zealand; 97/9 (20 overs)	v	England; 102/5 (18.4 overs)
Sophie Devine 37 (31); Heather Knight 2/14 (4 overs)		Heather Knight 26 (27); Lea Tahuhu 3/28 (4 overs)

England Women won by 5 wickets
Bert Sutcliffe Oval, Lincoln
Umpires: Kathy Cross (NZL) and Tim Parlane (NZL)
Player of the match: Heather Knight (England Women)

- England Women won the toss and elected to field.
- Anna Peterson (NZ) made her WT20I debut.
