= Sri Lanka women's cricket team against Pakistan in the UAE in 2014–15 =

Sri Lanka women's cricket team against Pakistan in the UAE in 2015
	Pakistan	Sri Lanka
- Dates: 9 January – 13 January 2015
Captains	Sana Mir	Chamari Atapattu

One Day International series
- Results: Pakistan won the 3-match series 3–0
Most runs	Javeria Khan (164)	Chamari Atapattu (159)
Most wickets	Sana Mir (6)	Shashikala Siriwardene (4)

Twenty20 International series
- Results: Sri Lanka won the 3-match series 2–1
Most runs	Bismah Maroof (103)	Chamari Atapattu (80)
Most wickets	Sana Mir (5)	Inoka Ranaweera (6)

The Sri Lanka women's cricket team toured UAE from 9 to 13 January 2015. The tour included three One Day Internationals (ODIs). The tour was part of the ICC Women's Championship. The tour also included three Women's Twenty20 International (T20I) matches. Pakistan won the ODI series 3–0, while Sri Lanka won the T20I series 2–1.

== ODI series ==
=== 1st ODI ===
ICC Women's Championship
9 January 2015
Scorecard

Pakistan; 180/5 (48.4 overs)	v	Sri Lanka; 178/8 (40.1 overs)
Marina Iqbal 69 (123); Inoka Ranaweera 3/28 (10 overs)		Chamari Atapattu 49 (75); Sadia Yousuf 2/28 (10 overs)

Pakistan Women won by 5 wickets
Sharjah Cricket Stadium, Sharjah
Umpires: Farooq Ali Khan (Pak) and Rashid Riaz (Pak)
Player of the match: Marina Iqbal (Pak)

- Sri Lanka Women won the toss and chose to bat
- ICC Women's Championship points: Pakistan Women 2, Sri Lanka Women 0

=== 2nd ODI ===
ICC Women's Championship
11 January 2015
Scorecard

Pakistan; 138/9 (50 overs)	v	Sri Lanka; 126/10 (45.1 overs)
Sana Mir 34 (79); Sugandika Kumari 3/24 (8 overs)		Dilani Manodara 38 (85); Bismah Maroof 3/14 (7 overs)

Pakistan Women won by 12 runs
Sharjah Cricket Stadium, Sharjah
Umpires: Farooq Ali Khan (Pak) and Rashid Riaz (Pak)
Player of the match: Sana Mir (Pak)

- Pakistan Women won the toss and chose to bat
- Sugandika Kumari (SL) made her WODI debut.
- ICC Women's Championship points: Pakistan Women 2, Sri Lanka Women 0

=== 3rd ODI ===
ICC Women's Championship
13 January 2015
Scorecard

Pakistan; 245/3 (47.2 overs)	v	Sri Lanka; 242/5 (50 overs)
Javeria Khan 133* (141); Shashikala Siriwardene 2/33 (6 overs)		Chamari Atapattu 99 (109); Sana Mir 2/35 (10 overs)

Pakistan Women won by 7 wickets
Sharjah Cricket Stadium, Sharjah
Umpires: Farooq Ali Khan (Pak) and Rashid Riaz (Pak)
Player of the match: Javeria Khan (Pak)

- Sri Lanka Women won the toss and chose to bat
- ICC Women's Championship points: Pakistan Women 2, Sri Lanka Women 0

== T20I series ==
=== 1st T20I ===
15 January 2015
Scorecard

Sri Lanka; 151/5 (20 overs)	v	Pakistan; 143/8 (20 overs)
Dilani Manodara 50* (40); Sania Khan 2/27 (3 overs)		Bismah Maroof 50* (45); Ama Kanchana 2/15 (2 overs)

Sri Lanka Women won by 8 runs
Sharjah Cricket Stadium, Sharjah
Umpires: Farooq Ali Khan (Pak) and Rashid Riaz (Pak)

- Sri Lanka Women won the toss and elected to bat.
- Chathurani Gunawardene and Sugandika Kumari (SL) both made their WT20I debuts.

=== 2nd T20I ===
16 January 2015
Scorecard

Pakistan; 124/6 (20 overs)	v	Sri Lanka; 69 (15.3 overs)
Sana Mir 48* (37); Maduri Samuddika 3/25 (4 overs)		Chathurani Gunawardene 14 (16); Sana Mir 4/14 (4 overs)

Pakistan Women won by 55 runs
Sharjah Cricket Stadium, Sharjah
Umpires: Farooq Ali Khan and Rashid Riaz
Player of the match: Sana Mir (Pak)

- Pakistan Women won the toss and elected to bat.
- Naila Nazir (Pak) made her WT20I debut.

=== 3rd T20I ===
17 January 2015
Scorecard

Pakistan; 110/9 (20 overs)	v	Sri Lanka; 112/5 (17.5 overs)
Bismah Maroof 46 (38); Udeshika Prabodhani 2/12 (4 overs)		Chamari Atapattu 44 (43); Nida Dar 2/20 (4 overs)

Sri Lanka Women won by 5 wickets
Sharjah Cricket Stadium, Sharjah
Umpires: Farooq Ali Khan and Rashid Riaz
Player of the match: Chamari Atapattu (SL)

- Pakistan Women won the toss and elected to bat.
