= 2016 Loughborough Lightning (women's cricket) season =

Loughborough Lightning
2016 season
- Coach: Salliann Briggs
- Captain: Georgia Elwiss
- Overseas player: Sophie Devine; Ellyse Perry; Dane van Niekerk
- WCSL: 3rd
- Most runs: Ellyse Perry (190)
- Most wickets: Rebecca Grundy (8)
- Most catches: Thea Brookes (4)
- Most wicket-keeping dismissals: Amy Jones (8)

The 2016 season was Loughborough Lightning's first season, in which they competed in the Women's Cricket Super League, a Twenty20 competition. The side finished third in the initial group stage, winning three of their five matches, therefore progressing to the semi-final. However, they lost to Western Storm by five wickets in the semi-final.

The side was partnered with Loughborough University, and played their home matches at the Haslegrave Ground. They were coached by Salliann Briggs and captained by Georgia Elwiss.

== Squad ==
Loughborough Lightning's 15-player squad is listed below. Age given is at the start of Loughborough Lightning's first match of the season (30 July 2016).

Name	Nationality	Birth date	Batting Style	Bowling Style	Notes
Batters
Georgie Boyce	England	4 October 1998 (aged 17)	Right-handed	Right-arm medium	
Evelyn Jones	England	8 August 1992 (aged 23)	Left-handed	Left-arm medium	
All-rounders
Thea Brookes	England	15 February 1993 (aged 23)	Right-handed	Right-arm off break	
Sophie Devine	New Zealand	1 September 1989 (aged 26)	Right-handed	Right-arm medium	Overseas player
Georgia Elwiss	England	31 May 1991 (aged 25)	Right-handed	Right arm medium	Captain
Alex MacDonald	England	3 October 1991 (aged 24)	Left-handed	Right-arm medium	
Ellyse Perry	Australia	1 November 1990 (aged 25)	Right-handed	Right-arm medium	Overseas player
Paige Scholfield	England	19 December 1995 (aged 20)	Right-handed	Right-arm medium	
Dane van Niekerk	South Africa	14 May 1993 (aged 23)	Right-handed	Right-arm leg break	Overseas player
Wicket-keepers
Lauren Griffiths	England	14 February 1987 (aged 29)	Right-handed	—	
Amy Jones	England	13 June 1993 (aged 23)	Right-handed	—	
Bowlers
Amy Gauvrit	England	14 March 1995 (aged 21)	Right-handed	Right-arm medium	
Rebecca Grundy	England	12 July 1990 (aged 26)	Left-handed	Slow left-arm orthodox	
Beth Langston	England	6 September 1992 (aged 23)	Right-handed	Right-arm medium	
Sonia Odedra	England	3 June 1988 (aged 28)	Right-handed	Right-arm medium	

== Women's Cricket Super League ==
=== Season standings ===
Points table
Pos	Team	Pld	W	L	T	NR	BP	Pts	NRR
1	Southern Vipers	5	4	1	0	0	3	11	1.437
2	Western Storm	5	4	1	0	0	1	9	0.838
3	Loughborough Lightning	5	3	2	0	0	2	8	0.170
4	Surrey Stars	5	2	3	0	0	1	5	−0.274
5	Yorkshire Diamonds	5	1	4	0	0	1	3	−0.362
6	Lancashire Thunder	5	1	4	0	0	0	2	−1.724

Source: ESPN Cricinfo

Advanced to the Final.
Advanced to the Semi-final.

=== League stage ===
30 July
14:30
Scorecard

Loughborough Lightning; 128/9 (20 overs)	v	Yorkshire Diamonds; 85 (17.1 overs)
Sophie Devine 52 (38); Jenny Gunn 2/20 (4 overs)		Lauren Winfield 23 (13); Rebecca Grundy 3/21 (4 overs)

Loughborough Lightning won by 43 runs
Headingley, Leeds
Umpires: Ben Debenham and Tom Lungley

- Loughborough Lightning won the toss and elected to bat.
- Points: Loughborough Lightning 3, Yorkshire Diamonds 0

3 August
16:30 (D/N)
Scorecard

Lancashire Thunder; 164/8 (20 overs)	v	Loughborough Lightning; 158 (19.5 overs)
Amy Satterthwaite 52 (32); Georgia Elwiss 2/37 (4 overs)		Paige Scholfield 38 (22); Sophie Ecclestone 3/23 (4 overs)

Lancashire Thunder won by 6 runs
Haslegrave Ground, Loughborough
Umpires: Ian Blackwell and Russell Warren

- Loughborough Lightning won the toss and elected to bowl.
- Points: Lancashire Thunder 2, Loughborough Lightning 0

5 August
16:30 (D/N)
Scorecard

Loughborough Lightning; 158/8 (20 overs)	v	Western Storm; 153/5 (20 overs)
Amy Jones 46 (30); Anya Shrubsole 2/26 (4 overs)		Heather Knight 74 (46); Sonia Odedra 2/20 (4 overs)

Loughborough Lightning won by 5 runs
Haslegrave Ground, Loughborough
Umpires: Ben Debenham and Russell Warren

- Loughborough Lightning won the toss and elected to bat.
- Points: Loughborough Lightning 2, Western Storm 0

12 August
16:30 (D/N)
Scorecard

Loughborough Lightning; 168/6 (20 overs)	v	Surrey Stars; 134 (19.5 overs)
Dane van Niekerk 91 (64); Lea Tahuhu 1/9 (1 over)		Laura Marsh 41 (24); Sophie Devine 2/12 (2.5 overs)

Loughborough Lightning won by 34 runs
Haslegrave Ground, Loughborough
Umpires: Paul Pollard and Russell Warren

- Surrey Stars won the toss and elected to field.
- Points: Loughborough Lightning 3, Surrey Stars 0

14 August
14:00
Scorecard

Southern Vipers; 156/4 (20 overs)	v	Loughborough Lightning; 97 (18.5 overs)
Suzie Bates 38 (24); Rebecca Grundy 2/24 (4 overs)		Ellyse Perry 35 (33); Linsey Smith 3/16 (4 overs)

Southern Vipers won by 59 runs
Rose Bowl, Southampton
Umpires: Ben Debenham and Tom Lungley

- Southern Vipers won the toss and elected to bat.
- Points: Southern Vipers 3, Loughborough Lightning 0

=== Semi-final ===
21 August
11:00
Scorecard

Loughborough Lightning; 124/7 (20 overs)	v	Western Storm; 128/5 (19.3 overs)
Ellyse Perry 64* (48); Stafanie Taylor 3/31 (4 overs)		Heather Knight 52 (43); Dane van Niekerk 2/21 (4 overs)

Western Storm won by 5 wickets
County Cricket Ground, Chelmsford
Umpires: Ben Debenham (Eng) and Tom Lungley (Eng)

- Western Storm won the toss and elected to field.

== Statistics ==
=== Batting ===
Player	Matches	Innings	NO	Runs	HS	Average	Strike rate	100s	50s	4s	6s
Thea Brookes	6	6	3	43	30*	14.33	138.70	0	0	5	1
Sophie Devine	6	6	0	92	52	15.33	92.92	0	1	7	2
Georgia Elwiss	6	6	0	64	22	10.66	86.48	0	0	8	2
Rebecca Grundy	6	3	2	3	3*	3.00	37.50	0	0	0	0
Amy Jones	6	6	0	91	46	15.16	119.73	0	0	11	0
Evelyn Jones	6	6	0	86	33	14.33	117.80	0	0	13	1
Beth Langston	6	3	0	3	2	1.00	25.00	0	0	0	0
Sonia Odedra	6	6	1	21	9	4.20	72.41	0	0	3	0
Ellyse Perry	6	6	2	190	64*	47.50	118.75	0	1	22	4
Paige Scholfield	6	5	1	61	38	15.25	145.23	0	0	9	1
Dane van Niekerk	6	6	0	126	91	21.00	115.59	0	1	20	3
Source: ESPN Cricinfo

=== Bowling ===
Player	Matches	Innings	Overs	Maidens	Runs	Wickets	BBI	Average	Economy	Strike rate
Sophie Devine	6	6	16.3	0	132	6	2/12	22.00	8.00	16.5
Georgia Elwiss	6	6	18.0	0	133	5	2/6	26.60	7.38	21.6
Rebecca Grundy	6	6	19.0	0	124	8	3/21	15.50	6.52	14.2
Beth Langston	6	5	9.0	1	58	3	2/14	19.33	6.44	18.0
Sonia Odedra	6	5	14.0	0	85	5	2/20	17.00	6.07	16.8
Ellyse Perry	6	6	19.0	0	145	4	1/17	36.25	7.63	28.5
Dane van Niekerk	6	6	21.0	0	126	7	2/21	18.00	6.00	18.0
Source: ESPN Cricinfo

=== Fielding ===
Player	Matches	Innings	Catches
Thea Brookes	6	6	4
Sophie Devine	6	6	1
Georgia Elwiss	6	6	3
Rebecca Grundy	6	6	1
Evelyn Jones	6	6	0
Beth Langston	6	6	0
Sonia Odedra	6	6	1
Ellyse Perry	6	6	2
Paige Scholfield	6	6	0
Dane van Niekerk	6	6	3
Source: ESPN Cricinfo

=== Wicket-keeping ===
Player	Matches	Innings	Catches	Stumpings
Amy Jones	6	6	4	4
Source: ESPN Cricinfo
