= India women's cricket team in England in 2014 =

	England	India
- Dates: 9 August – 25 August 2014
Captains	Charlotte Edwards	Mithali Raj

Test series
- Result: India won the 1-match series 1–0
Most runs	Sarah Taylor (70)	Smriti Mandhana (73)
Most wickets	Kate Cross (6)	Jhulan Goswami (5)
- Player of the series: Jenny Gunn (Eng)

One Day International series
- Results: England won the 3-match series 2–0
Most runs	Charlotte Edwards (165)	Smriti Mandhana (106)
Most wickets	Heather Knight; Jenny Gunn (5)	Rajeshwari Gayakwad (5)
- Player of the series: Charlotte Edwards (Eng)

The India women's cricket team toured England during the 2014 season where they defeated England in a one-off Test. This was India women's first Test since 2006 and their second victory against England.

There was also a three-match ODI series which was the part of the 2014–16 ICC Women's Championship. England won the series 2–0 as the third match was washed out.

== Squads ==
Test		ODIs	
England	India	England	India
Charlotte Edwards (C); Heather Knight (vc); Tammy Beaumont; Stephanie Butler; Kate Cross; Lydia Greenway; Jenny Gunn; Amy Jones (wk); Sonia Odedra; Nat Sciver; Anya Shrubsole; Sarah Taylor (wk); Lauren Winfield; Rebecca Grundy (withdrawn)	Mithali Raj (C); Harmanpreet Kaur (vc); Ekta Bisht; Rajeshwari Gayakwad; Jhulan Goswami; Karu Jain (wk); Thirush Kamini; Smriti Mandhana; Niranjana Nagarajan; Shikha Pandey; Poonam Yadav; Swagatika Rath; Poonam Raut; Shubhlakshmi Sharma; Vellaswamy Vanitha; Sushma Verma	Charlotte Edwards (C); Heather Knight (vc); Tammy Beaumont; Katherine Brunt; Kate Cross; Lydia Greenway; Jenny Gunn; Danielle Hazell; Amy Jones (wk); Sonia Odedra; Nat Sciver; Anya Shrubsole; Sarah Taylor (wk); Lauren Winfield; Rebecca Grundy (withdrawn)	Mithali Raj (C); Harmanpreet Kaur (vc); Ekta Bisht; Rajeshwari Gayakwad; Jhulan Goswami; Karu Jain (wk); Thirush Kamini; Smriti Mandhana; Niranjana Nagarajan; Shikha Pandey; Poonam Yadav; Swagatika Rath; Poonam Raut; Shubhlakshmi Sharma; Vellaswamy Vanitha; Sushma Verma

== Tour Match ==
7 August 2014
Scorecard

England Academy Women	v	(India) Indians
97/5 (41.4 overs); Amy Jones 33 (71); Ekta Bisht 3.19 (6.4 overs)		294 (88.2 overs); Vellaswamy Vanitha 94 (90); Sonia Odedra 3/28 (15 overs)

Match drawn
Haslegrave Ground, Loughborough
Umpires: Alan Payne (ENG) & Russell Warren (ENG)

- England Academy Women won the toss and elected to bat.
- England Academy Women 13 (11 batting, 11 fielding); India Women 12 (11 batting, 11 fielding)

== Test series ==
=== Only Test ===
13 August 2014
Scorecard

England	v	India
92 (41.2 overs); Sarah Taylor 30 (42); Niranjana Nagarajan 4/14 (14.2 overs)		114 (64.2 overs); Niranjana Nagarajan 27 (83); Jenny Gunn 5/19 (18 overs)
202 (96.3 overs); Jenny Gunn 62* (181); Jhulan Goswami 4/48 (22 overs)		183/6 (95.3 overs); Smriti Mandhana 51 (91); Kate Cross 2/42 (22 overs)

India Women won by 6 wickets
Sir Paul Getty's Ground, Wormsley
Umpires: David Millns (Eng) and Billy Taylor (Eng)
Player of the match: Jenny Gunn (Eng)

- India Women won the toss and elected to field.
- Sonia Odedra and Lauren Winfield (England Women); Ekta Bisht, Thirush Kamini, Harmanpreet Kaur, Smriti Mandhana, Niranjana Nagarajan, Shikha Pandey, Poonam Raut and Shubhlakshmi Sharma (India Women) made Test debuts

== ODI series ==
=== 1st ODI ===
ICC Women's Championship
21 August 2014
Scorecard

England; 153/3 (30.1 overs)	v	India; 192/8 (47 overs)
Charlotte Edwards 57 (64); Rajeshwari Gayakwad 1/17 (5 overs)		Smriti Mandhana 74 (99); Heather Knight 3/28 (7 overs)

England Women won by 42 runs (D/L method)
North Marine Road Ground, Scarborough
Umpires: Jeff Evans (Eng) & Steve O'Shaughnessy (Eng)
Player of the match: Heather Knight (Eng)

- England Women won the toss and elected to field.
- Rain stopped play: 60/2 off 18 overs, (3 overs lost).
  Rain stopped play: 44/0 off 5 overs (5 overs lost), revised target 184.
  Rain stopped play: 153/3 off 30.1 overs.
- Shikha Pandey (Ind) made her ODI debut.
- ICC Women's Championship points: England Women 2, India Women 0

=== 2nd ODI ===
ICC Women's Championship
23 August 2014
Scorecard

England; 214/9 (50 overs)	v	India; 201 (48.4 overs)
Charlotte Edwards 108* (145); Rajeshwari Gayakwad 4/42 (10 overs)		Harmanpreet Kaur 43 (62); Jenny Gunn 4/23 (10 overs)

England Women won by 13 runs
North Marine Road Ground, Scarborough
Umpires: Mark Benson (Eng) & Martin Saggers (Eng)
Player of the match: Charlotte Edwards (Eng)

- India Women won the toss chose to field.
- England Women led the 3-match series 2-0.
- ICC Women's Championship points: England Women 2, India Women 0

=== 3rd ODI ===
ICC Women's Championship
25 August 2014
Scorecard

England	v	India

Match abandoned without a ball bowled
Lord's, London
Umpires: Nick Cook (Eng) & Ismail Dawood (Eng)

- No toss.
- England Women won the 3-match series 2-0.
- ICC Women's Championship points: England Women 1, India Women 1
