= 2016 One-Day Cup =

2016 Royal London One-Day Cup
- Dates: 5 June – 17 September 2016
- Administrator: England and Wales Cricket Board
- Cricket format: Limited overs cricket (50 overs)
- Tournament format(s): Group stage and knockout
- Champions: Warwickshire Bears
- Participants: 18
- Matches: 79
- Most runs: Sam Hain (540)
- Most wickets: Matt Coles (24)
- Official website: ecb.co.uk

The 2016 Royal London One-Day Cup tournament was a limited overs cricket competition that formed part of the 2016 domestic cricket season in England and Wales. Matches were contested over 50 overs per side and have List A status. All eighteen First-class counties competed in the tournament. Defending champions Gloucestershire went out in the group stage, as Warwickshire Bears beat Surrey in the final.

== Format ==
The competition featured two groups of nine teams, with the top four teams from each group progressing to the quarter-finals. The groups for the 2016 season were based on a geographical split, with a North and South group.

North Group	South Group
Derbyshire Falcons	Essex Eagles
Durham	Glamorgan
Lancashire Lightning	Gloucestershire
Leicestershire Foxes	Hampshire
Northamptonshire Steelbacks	Kent Spitfires
Nottinghamshire Outlaws	Middlesex
Warwickshire Bears	Somerset
Worcestershire	Surrey
Yorkshire Vikings	Sussex Sharks

== Group stage ==
=== North Group ===
==== Table ====
Pos	Team	Pld	W	L	T	NR	Ded	Pts	NRR
1	Northamptonshire Steelbacks	8	4	3	0	1	0	9	0.784
2	Warwickshire Bears	8	4	3	0	1	0	9	0.740
3	Yorkshire Vikings	8	4	3	0	1	0	9	0.596
4	Worcestershire	8	4	3	0	1	0	9	0.040
5	Durham	8	4	3	0	1	0	9	−0.634
6	Nottinghamshire Outlaws	8	3	4	0	1	0	7	0.228
7	Derbyshire Falcons	8	2	3	0	3	0	7	−0.335
8	Leicestershire Foxes	8	2	3	0	3	0	7	−0.486
9	Lancashire Lightning	8	2	4	0	2	0	6	−1.328

==== Fixtures ====
5 June
Scorecard

Lancashire Lightning (H); 296/5 (50 overs)	v	Warwickshire Bears; 254/9 (50 overs)

Lancashire won by 42 runs
Old Trafford, Manchester

5 June
Scorecard

Durham; 340/6 (50 overs)	v	(H) Leicestershire Foxes; 329/9 (50 overs)

Durham won by 11 runs
Grace Road, Leicester

5 June
Scorecard

Worcestershire (H); 295 (49.4 overs)	v	Derbyshire Falcons; 298/3 (48.1 overs)

Derbyshire won by 7 wickets
New Road, Worcester

6 June
Scorecard

Nottinghamshire Outlaws (H); 445/8 (50 overs)	v	Northamptonshire Steelbacks; 425 (48.2 overs)

Nottinghamshire won by 20 runs
Trent Bridge, Nottingham

7 June
Scorecard

Durham; 216 (46.3 overs)	v	(H) Derbyshire Falcons; 218/3 (41.4 overs)

Derbyshire won by 7 wickets
County Ground, Derby

7 June
Scorecard

Leicestershire Foxes; 237 (39 overs)	v	(H) Warwickshire Bears; 243/1 (41 overs)

Warwickshire won by 9 wickets
Edgbaston, Birmingham

7 June
Scorecard

Yorkshire Vikings (H); 170 (45.2 overs)	v	Worcestershire; 171/3 (25.3 overs)

Worcestershire won by 7 wickets
Headingley, Leeds

8 June
Scorecard

Northamptonshire Steelbacks (H); 287/8 (50 overs)	v	Lancashire Lightning; 211 (43.3 overs)

Northamptonshire won by 76 runs
County Ground, Northampton

8 June
Scorecard

Nottinghamshire Outlaws (H); 415/5 (50 overs)	v	Warwickshire Bears; 379 (49.3 overs)

Nottinghamshire won by 36 runs
Trent Bridge, Nottingham

12 June
Scorecard

Derbyshire Falcons (H); 0/0 (1 overs)	v	Yorkshire Vikings

No result
County Ground, Derby

12 June
Scorecard

Durham (H); 90 (21.1 overs)	v	Worcestershire; 91/3 (19.1 overs)

Worcestershire won by 7 wickets (D/L method)
Riverside Ground, Chester-le-Street

12 June
Scorecard

Lancashire Lightning (H); 157/1 (33 overs)	v	Nottinghamshire Outlaws

No result
Blackpool Cricket Club, Blackpool

12 June
Scorecard

Northamptonshire Steelbacks (H); 12/0 (2 overs)	v	Leicestershire Foxes

No result
County Ground, Northampton

14 June
Scorecard

Northamptonshire Steelbacks; 310/7 (50 overs)	v	(H) Yorkshire Vikings; 314/8 (47.3 overs)

Yorkshire won by 2 wickets (D/L method)
North Marine Road Ground, Scarborough

15 June
Scorecard

Worcestershire (H)	v	Leicestershire Foxes

No result
New Road, Worcester

15 June
Scorecard

Nottinghamshire Outlaws; 274/5 (42 overs)	v	(H) Durham; 253/8 (37 overs)

Durham won by 2 wickets (D/L method)
Riverside Ground, Chester-le-Street

15 June
Scorecard

Yorkshire Vikings; 325/7 (47 overs)	v	(H) Lancashire Lightning; 84 (17.3 overs)

Yorkshire won by 242 runs (D/L method)
Old Trafford, Manchester

15 June
Scorecard

Warwickshire Bears (H)	v	Derbyshire Falcons

No result
Edgbaston, Birmingham

24 July
Scorecard

Worcestershire; 115 (38.2 overs)	v	(H) Warwickshire Bears; 119/2 (22.4 overs)

Warwickshire won by 8 wickets
Edgbaston, Birmingham

24 July
Scorecard

Yorkshire Vikings; 376/3 (50 overs)	v	(H) Leicestershire Foxes; 185 (33.3 overs)

Yorkshire won by 191 runs
Grace Road, Leicester

24 July
Scorecard

Nottinghamshire Outlaws (H); 340/7 (50 overs)	v	Derbyshire Falcons; 275 (45.1 overs)

Nottinghamshire won by 65 runs
John Fretwell Sporting Complex, Nettleworth

24 July
Scorecard

Northamptonshire Steelbacks (H); 355/6 (50 overs)	v	Durham; 185 (35.3 overs)

Northamptonshire won by 170 runs
County Ground, Northampton

26 July
Scorecard

Leicestershire Foxes (H); 307/8 (50 overs)	v	Lancashire Lightning; 176 (39.3 overs)

Leicestershire won by 131 runs
Grace Road, Leicester

26 July
Scorecard

Northamptonshire Steelbacks; 254/9 (50 overs)	v	(H) Warwickshire Bears; 257/2 (50 overs)

Warwickshire won by 8 wickets
Edgbaston, Birmingham

27 July
Scorecard

Northamptonshire Steelbacks; 319/7 (50 overs)	v	(H) Worcestershire; 296 (49.5 overs)

Northamptonshire won by 23 runs
New Road, Worcester

27 July
Scorecard

Nottinghamshire Outlaws; 251/9 (50 overs)	v	(H) Yorkshire Vikings; 254/8 (49.4 overs)

Yorkshire won by 2 wickets
North Marine Road Ground, Scarborough

27 July
Scorecard

Warwickshire Bears; 292/7 (50 overs)	v	(H) Durham; 296/6 (47.4 overs)

Durham won by 4 wickets
South Northumberland Cricket Club, Gosforth

27 July
Scorecard

Lancashire Lightning; 281/8 (50 overs)	v	(H) Derbyshire Falcons; 254/9 (50 overs)

Lancashire won by 27 runs
County Ground, Derby

31 July
Scorecard

Derbyshire Falcons; 272/7 (50 overs)	v	(H) Northamptonshire Steelbacks; 278/3 (42 overs)

Northamptonshire won by 7 wickets
County Ground, Northampton

31 July
Scorecard

Lancashire Lightning; 267/7 (50 overs)	v	(H) Worcestershire; 268/6 (47.4 overs)

Worcestershire won by 4 wickets
New Road, Worcester

31 July
Scorecard

Leicestershire Foxes (H); 279 (50 overs)	v	Nottinghamshire Outlaws; 271/9 (50 overs)

Leicestershire won by 8 runs
Grace Road, Leicester

31 July
Scorecard

Durham (H); 281/7 (50 overs)	v	Yorkshire Vikings; 266/8 (50 overs)

Durham won by 15 runs
Riverside Ground, Chester-le-Street

1 August
Scorecard

Lancashire Lightning (H); 39/0 (7 overs)	v	Durham

No result
Old Trafford, Manchester

1 August
Scorecard

Derbyshire Falcons (H); 260/6 (50 overs)	v	Leicestershire Foxes; 0/0 (0.2 overs)

No result
County Ground, Derby

1 August
Scorecard

Warwickshire Bears; 283/6 (50 overs)	v	(H) Yorkshire Vikings; 167 (37.4 overs)

Warwickshire won by 114 runs (D/L method)
Headingley, Leeds

1 August
Scorecard

Nottinghamshire Outlaws (H); 284/8 (50 overs)	v	Worcestershire; 138/1 (24 overs)

Worcestershire won by 35 runs (D/L method)
Trent Bridge, Nottingham

=== South Group ===
==== Table ====
Pos	Team	Pld	W	L	T	NR	Ded	Pts	NRR
1	Somerset	8	6	1	1	0	0	13	−0.087
2	Kent Spitfires	8	5	3	0	0	0	10	0.587
3	Essex Eagles	8	4	2	1	1	0	10	−0.119
4	Surrey	8	4	3	0	1	0	9	0.992
5	Hampshire	8	4	4	0	0	0	8	0.393
6	Middlesex	8	4	4	0	0	0	8	0.117
7	Glamorgan	8	3	4	0	1	0	7	−0.320
8	Gloucestershire	8	2	5	0	1	0	5	−0.709
9	Sussex Sharks	8	1	7	0	0	0	2	−0.679

==== Fixtures ====
5 June
Scorecard

Hampshire (H); 310/4 (50 overs)	v	Essex Eagles; 314/7 (49.3 overs)

Essex won by 3 wickets
The Rose Bowl, Southampton

5 June
Scorecard

Surrey; 255/8 (50 overs)	v	(H) Kent Spitfires; 260/9 (49.5 overs)

Kent won by 1 wicket
County Ground, Beckenham

5 June
Scorecard

Gloucestershire; 260 (50 overs)	v	(H) Somerset; 263/9 (49.3 overs)

Somerset won by 1 wicket
County Ground, Taunton

6 June
Scorecard

Glamorgan (H); 289 (49.5 overs)	v	Gloucestershire; 237 (47.1 overs)

Glamorgan won by 52 runs
Sophia Gardens, Cardiff

6 June
Scorecard

Sussex Sharks (H); 271 (50 overs)	v	Essex Eagles; 275/5 (49 overs)

Essex won by 5 wickets
County Ground, Hove

7 June
Scorecard

Middlesex (H); 295/8 (50 overs)	v	Hampshire; 204/5 (25.3 overs)

Hampshire won by 5 wickets (D/L method)
Brunton Memorial Ground, Radlett

8 June
Scorecard

Glamorgan (H); 302/6 (50 overs)	v	Sussex Sharks; 218 (42.4 overs)

Glamorgan won by 84 runs
Sophia Gardens, Cardiff

8 June
Scorecard

Gloucestershire (H); 254/8 (50 overs)	v	Middlesex; 211/3 (31.3 overs)

Middlesex won by 7 wickets (D/L method)
County Ground, Bristol

8 June
Scorecard

Surrey (H); 163/6 (24 overs)	v	Somerset; 180/2 (23.1 overs)

Somerset won by 8 wickets (D/L method)
The Oval, London

12 June
Scorecard

Somerset; 179/8 (29 overs)	v	(H) Essex Eagles; 176/9 (29 overs)

Match tied (D/L method)
County Ground, Chelmsford

12 June
Scorecard

Kent Spitfires (H); 290/3 (42 overs)	v	Glamorgan; 294/7 (40.5 overs)

Glamorgan won by 3 wickets (D/L method)
St Lawrence Ground, Canterbury

12 June
Scorecard

Sussex Sharks (H); 222/7 (32 overs)	v	Middlesex; 191 (30.4 overs)

Sussex won by 31 runs
County Ground, Hove

14 June
Scorecard

Kent Spitfires (H); 231/6 (30 overs)	v	Somerset; 136 (24.2 overs)

Kent won by 95 runs
St Lawrence Ground, Canterbury

14 June
Scorecard

Sussex Sharks; 239 (43.3 overs)	v	(H) Surrey; 235/4 (33.4 overs)

Surrey won by 6 wickets (D/L method)
Woodbridge Road, Guildford

14 June
Scorecard

Middlesex; 294/7 (50 overs)	v	(H) Glamorgan; 266 (48.2 overs)

Middlesex won by 28 runs
Sophia Gardens, Cardiff

14 June
Scorecard

Gloucestershire (H); 352/3 (50 overs)	v	Hampshire; 342/8 (50 overs)

Gloucestershire won by 10 runs
County Ground, Bristol

15 June
Scorecard

Kent Spitfires; 285/8 (50 overs)	v	(H) Essex Eagles; 289/5 (49.1 overs)

Essex won by 5 wickets
County Ground, Chelmsford

15 June
Scorecard

Hampshire (H); 289/8 (50 overs)	v	Surrey; 283/9 (50 overs)

Hampshire won by 6 runs
The Rose Bowl, Southampton

24 July
Scorecard

Somerset (H); 322/7 (50 overs)	v	Glamorgan; 279 (45.2 overs)

Somerset won by 33 runs (D/L method)
County Ground, Taunton

24 July
Scorecard

Kent Spitfires; 238/7 (50 overs)	v	(H) Middlesex; 239/4 (44.5 overs)

Middlesex won by 6 wickets
Lord's, London

24 July
Scorecard

Surrey; 313/8 (50 overs)	v	(H) Essex Eagles; 247 (41.2 overs)

Surrey won by 66 runs
County Ground, Chelmsford

24 July
Scorecard

Gloucestershire (H); 242/8 (50 overs)	v	Sussex Sharks; 191 (45.4 overs)

Gloucestershire won by 51 runs
College Ground, Cheltenham

26 July
Scorecard

Middlesex; 296/9 (50 overs)	v	(H) Somerset; 297/6 (49 overs)

Somerset won by 4 wickets
County Ground, Taunton

26 July
Scorecard

Glamorgan; 324/8 (50 overs)	v	(H) Essex Eagles; 325/6 (49.1 overs)

Essex won by 4 wickets
County Ground, Chelmsford

26 July
Scorecard

Hampshire (H); 229 (47.5 overs)	v	Kent Spitfires; 231/5 (43.3 overs)

Kent won by 5 wickets
The Rose Bowl, Southampton

27 July
Scorecard

Surrey (H); 323/8 (50 overs)	v	Gloucestershire; 158 (33.2 overs)

Surrey won by 165 runs
The Oval, London

27 July
Scorecard

Hampshire; 268/9 (50 overs)	v	(H) Sussex Sharks; 259/6 (50 overs)

Hampshire won by 9 runs
County Ground, Hove

30 July
Scorecard

Somerset (H); 237 (50 overs)	v	Sussex Sharks; 227/9 (50 overs)

Somerset won by 10 runs
County Ground, Taunton

31 July
Scorecard

Middlesex (H); 219/8 (50 overs)	v	Essex Eagles; 215/9 (50 overs)

Middlesex won by 4 runs
Lord's, London

31 July
Scorecard

Gloucestershire; 200 (49.2 overs)	v	(H) Kent Spitfires; 203/3 (41.2 overs)

Kent won by 7 wickets
St Lawrence Ground, Canterbury

31 July
Scorecard

Hampshire; 316/5 (50 overs)	v	(H) Glamorgan; 130 (32 overs)

Hampshire won by 186 runs
St Helen's, Swansea

1 August
Scorecard

Surrey (H); 157/1 (19 overs)	v	Glamorgan

No result
The Oval, London

2 August
Scorecard

Gloucestershire (H)	v	Essex Eagles

No result
County Ground, Bristol

2 August
Scorecard

Sussex Sharks (H); 182/8 (43 overs)	v	Kent Spitfires; 184/3 (31.5 overs)

Kent won by 7 wickets
County Ground, Hove

2 August
Scorecard

Somerset; 250/9 (50 overs)	v	(H) Hampshire; 245 (50 overs)

Somerset won by 5 runs
The Rose Bowl, Southampton

2 August
Scorecard

Middlesex (H); 101/8 (16 overs)	v	Surrey; 105/5 (15.2 overs)

Surrey won by 5 wickets
Lord's, London

== Knockout stage ==
Quarter-finals
Somerset	214/1
Worcestershire	210/10
Warwickshire Bears	283/7
Essex Eagles	213/10
Northamptonshire Steelbacks	276/10
Surrey	279/9
Kent Spitfires	245/10
Yorkshire Vikings	256/9

Semi-finals
Somerset	276/9
Warwickshire Bears	284/4
Yorkshire Vikings	236/10
Surrey	255/7

Final
Warwickshire Bears	137/2
Surrey	136/10

=== Quarter-finals ===
17 August 2016
11:00 BST
Scorecard

Worcestershire; 210 (42.5 overs)	v	Somerset (H); 214/1 (36.5 overs)
Moeen Ali 81 (76); Peter Trego 3/33 (8 overs)		Mahela Jayawardene 117* (111); Moeen Ali 1/53 (10 overs)

Somerset won by 9 wickets
County Ground, Taunton
Umpires: Rob Bailey and Jeremy Lloyds
Player of the match: Mahela Jayawardene (Somerset)

- Worcestershire won the toss and elected to bat.

17 August 2016
11:00 BST
Scorecard

Warwickshire (H); 283/7 (50 overs)	v	Essex; 213 (42.1 overs)
Jonathan Trott 101 (124); Graham Napier 3/60 (10 overs)		Tom Westley 61 (73); Jeetan Patel 3/32 (7.1 overs)

Warwickshire won by 70 runs
Edgbaston Cricket Ground, Birmingham
Umpires: David Millns and Tim Robinson

- Warwickshire won the toss and elected to bat.

18 August 2016
13:30 BST (D/N)
Scorecard

Northamptonshire (H); 276 (49 overs)	v	Surrey; 279/9 (50 overs)
Rory Kleinveldt 76* (62); Jade Dernbach 4/39 (10 overs)		Kumar Sangakkara 130* (145); Josh Cobb 2/28 (7 overs)

Surrey won by 1 wicket
County Ground, Northampton
Umpires: Nick Cook and Steve O'Shaughnessy

- Northamptonshire won the toss and elected to bat.

18 August 2016
14:00 BST (D/N)
Scorecard

Yorkshire; 256/9 (50 overs)	v	Kent (H); 245 (47.5 overs)
Adam Lyth 88 (96); Matt Coles 3/39 (10 overs)		Darren Stevens 54 (74); Liam Plunkett 4/52 (10 overs)

Yorkshire won by 11 runs
St Lawrence Ground, Canterbury
Umpires: Neil Mallender and Alex Wharf

- Kent won the toss and elected to field.

=== Semi-finals ===
28 August 2016
11:00 BST
Scorecard

Surrey; 255/7 (50 overs)	v	Yorkshire (H); 236 (48.5 overs)
Steven Davies 104 (116); Matthew Waite 3/48 (10 overs)		Tim Bresnan 68 (82); Stuart Meaker 3/61 (10 overs)

Surrey won by 19 runs
Headingley, Leeds
Umpires: Peter Hartley and Jeremy Lloyds
Player of the match: Steven Davies (Surrey)

- Yorkshire won the toss and elected to field.

29 August 2016
11:00 BST
Scorecard

Warwickshire (H); 284/4 (50 overs)	v	Somerset; 276/9 (50 overs)
Ian Bell 94* (90); Roelof van der Merwe 2/62 (10 overs)		Peter Trego 58 (80); Jeetan Patel 5/43 (10 overs)

Warwickshire won by 8 runs
Edgbaston Cricket Ground, Birmingham
Umpires: Rob Bailey and David Millns
Player of the match: Jeetan Patel (Warwickshire)

- Warwickshire won the toss and elected to bat.

=== Final ===
17 September 2016
11:00 BST
Scorecard

Surrey; 136 (40.1 overs)	v	Warwickshire; 137/2 (30.2 overs)
Rory Burns 40 (83); Ateeq Javid 2/15 (5 overs)		Jonathan Trott 82* (100); Stuart Meaker 1/25 (4 overs)

Warwickshire won by 8 wickets
Lord's, London
Umpires: David Millns and Tim Robinson
Player of the match: Jonathan Trott (Warwickshire)

- Surrey won the toss and elected to bat.

== See also ==
- ECB 40
