= West Indies women's cricket team in Australia in 2014–15 =

| | Australia women | West Indies Women |
- Dates: 21 October – 18 November
| Captains | Meg Lanning | Merissa Aguilleira |

One Day International series
- Results: Australia women won the 4-match series 4–0
| Most runs | Meg Lanning (336) | Hayley Matthews (241) |
| Most wickets | Erin Osborne (7); Ellyse Perry (7) | Deandra Dottin (5) |
- Player of the series: Ellyse Perry (Aus)

Twenty20 International series
- Results: Australia women won the 4-match series 4–0
| Most runs | Elyse Villani (156) | Stafanie Taylor (155) |
| Most wickets | Kristen Beams (6); Ellyse Perry (6) | Anisa Mohammed (5) |
- Player of the series: Jess Jonassen (Aus)

West Indies women's cricket team toured Australia from 21 October 2014 to 18 November 2014. The tour included a series of four Twenty20 Internationals and four One Day Internationals. The first three ODI matches were a part of the 2014–16 ICC Women's Championship. Australia women won both series 4–0. West Indian women also played two T20 matches against Cricket Australia Women's XI.

== Squads ==
| ODIs | | T20Is | | |
| Australia | West Indies | Australia | West Indies | Cricket Australia Women's XI |
|---|---|---|---|---|
| Meg Lanning (c); Alex Blackwell (vc); Kristen Beams; Jess Cameron; Julie Hunter; Rene Farrell; Alyssa Healy (wk); Jess Jonassen; Nicole Bolton; Erin Osborne; Ellyse Perry; Megan Schutt; Elyse Villani | Merissa Aguilleira (c/wk); Stafanie Taylor (vc); Shemaine Campbelle; Shamilia Connell; Britney Cooper; Shanel Daley; Deandra Dottin; Kycia Knight (wk); Hayley Matthews; Anisa Mohammed; Subrina Munroe; Shaquana Quintyne; Shakera Selman; Tremayne Smartt | Meg Lanning (c); Alex Blackwell (vc); Kristen Beams; Jess Cameron; Sarah Coyte; Rene Farrell; Alyssa Healy (wk); Jess Jonassen; Delissa Kimmince; Erin Osborne; Ellyse Perry; Megan Schutt; Elyse Villani | Merissa Aguilleira (c/wk); Stafanie Taylor (vc); Shemaine Campbelle; Shamilia Connell; Britney Cooper; Shanel Daley; Deandra Dottin; Kycia Knight (wk); Hayley Matthews; Anisa Mohammed; Subrina Munroe; Shaquana Quintyne; Shakera Selman; Tremayne Smartt | Ellyse Perry (c); Jess Cameron (vc); Jemma Barsby; Nicola Carey; Rhiannon Dick; Grace Harris; Emma Inglis (wk); Delissa Kimmince; Beth Mooney (wk); Angela Reakes; Megan Schutt; Kara Sutherland |

== Tour matches ==
=== 1st T20 ===
21 October 2014
[ Scorecard]

| West Indies; 104/4 (20 overs) | v | Cricket Australia Women's XI; 107/1 (16.1 overs) |

Cricket Australia Women's XI won by 9 wickets
Chisholm No 1 Oval
Umpires: MS Ferris and D Young

- West Indies Women won the toss and decided to bat

=== 2nd T20 ===
22 October 2014
Scorecard

| Cricket Australia Women's XI; 128/5 (20 overs) | v | West Indies; 122/4 (20 overs) |

Cricket Australia Women's XI won by 6 runs
Manuka Oval
Umpires: AR Crozier and Y Ramasundara

- West Indies Women won the toss and decided to field

== T20I series ==
=== 1st T20I ===
2 November 2014
Scorecard

| West Indies; 113/7 (20 overs) | v | Australia; 117/6 (18.5 overs) |
| Stafanie Taylor 52/54; Kristen Beams 2/15 (3 overs) | | Jess Jonassen 46/51; Anisa Mohammed 3/25 (4 overs) |

Australia Women won by 4 wickets
North Sydney Oval
Umpires: GJ Davidson and AK Wilds
Player of the match: Jess Jonassen

- Australia Women won the toss and decided to field

=== 2nd T20I ===
5 November 2014
Scorecard

| Australia; 160/4 (20 overs) | v | West Indies; 74/9 (20 overs) |
| Elyse Villani 50/34; Shaquana Quintyne 2/32 (4 overs) | | Stafanie Taylor 19/23; Kristen Beams 3/16 (4 overs) |

Australia Women won by 86 runs
Adelaide Oval
Umpires: GJ Davidson and AK Wilds
Player of the match: Jess Jonassen

- West Indies Women won the toss and decided to field

=== 3rd T20I ===
7 November 2014
Scorecard

| West Indies; 149/6 (20 overs) | v | Australia; 150/6 (19.5 overs) |
| Stafanie Taylor 78(58); Rene Farrell 2/31 (4 overs) | | Meg Lanning 51(35); Anisa Mohammed 2/27 (4 overs) |

Australia Women won by 4 wickets
Melbourne Cricket Ground
Umpires: GJ Davidson and AK Wilds
Player of the match: Stafanie Taylor

- West Indies Women, who chose to bat

=== 4th T20I ===
9 November
Scorecard

| West Indies; 107/7 (20 overs) | v | Australia; 111/2 (14.1 overs) |
| Shemaine Campbelle 34(34); Ellyse Perry 3/9 (4 overs) | | Elyse Villani 59(45); Shanel Daley 1/17 (3 overs) |

Australia Women won by 8 wickets
Stadium Australia, Sydney
Umpires: Shawn Craig and Greg Davidson
Player of the match: Ellyse Perry

- West Indies Women, who chose to bat

== ODI series ==
=== 1st ODI ===
ICC Women's Championship
11 November
Scorecard

| West Indies; 8/240 (50 overs) | v | Australia; 7/241 (49.3 overs) |
| Stafanie Taylor 95 (102); Erin Osborne 3/43 (10 overs) | | Meg Lanning 95 (105); Shanel Daley 2/38 (8 overs) |

Australia Women won by 3 wickets
Hurstville Oval, Sydney
Umpires: Phillip Gillespie and AK Wilds
Player of the match: Stafanie Taylor (Aus)

- Australia Women won the toss and elected to field.
- ICC Women's Championship points: Australia Women 2, West Indies Women 0
- Phillip Gillespie made his WODI debut as an umpire.

=== 2nd ODI ===
ICC Women's Championship
13 November
Scorecard

| Australia; 256 (50 overs) | v | West Indies; 8/203 (50 overs) |
| Nicole Bolton 76 (95); Deandra Dottin 4/42 (8 overs) | | Hayley Matthews 89 (108); Ellyse Perry 3/42 (10 overs) |

Australia Women won by 53 runs
Hurstville Oval, Sydney
Umpires: Phillip Gillespie and AK Wilds
Player of the match: Ellyse Perry (Aus)

- Australia Women won the toss and elected to bat.
- ICC Women's Championship points: Australia Women 2, West Indies Women 0

=== 3rd ODI ===
ICC Women's Championship
16 November
Scorecard

| West Indies; 7/220 (50 overs) | v | Australia; 2/222 (43.1 overs) |
| Hayley Matthews 60 (81); Rene Farrell 2/40 (8 overs) | | Meg Lanning 135* (127); Stafanie Taylor 1/24 (7 overs) |

Australia Women won by 8 wickets
Bradman Oval, Bowral
Umpires: Phillip Gillespie and AK Wilds
Player of the match: Meg Lanning (Aus)

- West Indies Women, who chose to bat
- ICC Women's Championship points: Australia Women 2, West Indies Women 0

=== 4th ODI ===
18 November
Scorecard

| Australia; 5/275 (50 overs) | v | West Indies; 127 (24.5 overs) |
| Meg Lanning 84 (79); Shakera Selman 1/26 (5 overs) | | Hayley Matthews 37 (43); Megan Schutt 4/18 (4 overs) |

Australia Women won by 148 runs
Bradman Oval, Bowral
Umpires: Phillip Gillespie and Anthony Wilds
Player of the match: Ellyse Perry (Aus)

- Australia Women won the toss and elected to bat.
