= 2015 Women's Ashes series =

International cricket tour

2015 Women's Ashes
	England	Australia
- Dates: 21 July – 31 August 2015
Captains	Charlotte Edwards	Meg Lanning
- Player of the series: Ellyse Perry (Aus)
Most runs	Lydia Greenway (202)	Ellyse Perry (264)
Most wickets	Anya Shrubsole (13)	Ellyse Perry (16)

Test series
- Result: Australia won the 1-match series 1–0
Most runs	Georgia Elwiss (63)	Jess Jonassen (153)
Most wickets	Anya Shrubsole (5)	Ellyse Perry (9)

One Day International series
- Results: Australia won the 3-match series 2–1
Most runs	Lydia Greenway (118)	Meg Lanning (195)
Most wickets	Heather Knight (4)	Sarah Coyte (5)
- Player of the series: Ellyse Perry (Aus)

Twenty20 International series
- Results: England won the 3-match series 2–1
Most runs	Nat Sciver (67)	Ellyse Perry (53)
Most wickets	Anya Shrubsole (7)	Rene Farrell (5)
- Player of the series: Anya Shrubsole (Eng)

Total Ashes points
- England 6, Australia 10

The Australian women's cricket team toured England in 2015. The matches against England were played for the Women's Ashes, which since 2013 consists of a multi-format series with points awarded for each of the matches. Two points were awarded for each Twenty20 International (T20I) or One Day International (ODI) win, and four points to the Test winner (compared with six in the previous series) or two points to each team in the event of a Test draw.

The Women's Ashes were held by England before the series but, after winning two ODIs, the Test match and the second T20I, Australia regained the Ashes on 28 August 2015 with one T20I match to play. It was also the first time Australia had won the Ashes in England since 2001, after a draw in 2009 and defeats in the 2005 and 2013 series.

Australia won the ODI match series (2–1) and the sole Test match. England won the T20I match series (2–1). Overall Australia won the Ashes (10 points to 6). Australia's Ellyse Perry scored 264 runs, took 16 wickets and was named the player of the series.

The ODI matches were also part of the 2014–16 ICC Women's Championship.

== Squads ==
ODIs		Test		T20Is	
England	Australia	England	Australia	England	Australia
Charlotte Edwards (c); Heather Knight (vc); Katherine Brunt; Kate Cross; Georgia Elwiss; Lydia Greenway; Rebecca Grundy; Jenny Gunn; Amy Jones; Laura Marsh; Nat Sciver; Anya Shrubsole; Sarah Taylor (wk); Lauren Winfield	Meg Lanning (c); Alex Blackwell (vc); Kristen Beams; Nicole Bolton; Jess Cameron; Sarah Coyte; Rene Farrell; Holly Ferling; Alyssa Healy (wk); Jess Jonassen; Erin Osborne; Ellyse Perry; Megan Schutt; Elyse Villani	Charlotte Edwards (c); Heather Knight (vc); Katherine Brunt; Kate Cross; Georgia Elwiss; Lydia Greenway; Rebecca Grundy; Jenny Gunn; Laura Marsh; Nat Sciver; Anya Shrubsole; Sarah Taylor(wk); Fran Wilson; Lauren Winfield	Meg Lanning (c); Alex Blackwell (vc); Kristen Beams; Nicole Bolton; Jess Cameron; Sarah Coyte; Rene Farrell; Holly Ferling; Alyssa Healy (wk); Jess Jonassen; Erin Osborne; Ellyse Perry; Megan Schutt; Elyse Villani	Charlotte Edwards (c); Heather Knight (vc); Katherine Brunt; Georgia Elwiss; Lydia Greenway; Rebecca Grundy; Jenny Gunn; Danielle Hazell; Laura Marsh; Nat Sciver; Anya Shrubsole; Sarah Taylor (wk); Lauren Winfield; Danielle Wyatt	Meg Lanning (c); Alex Blackwell (vc); Kristen Beams; Nicole Bolton; Jess Cameron; Sarah Coyte; Rene Farrell; Holly Ferling; Alyssa Healy (wk); Jess Jonassen; ~~Delissa Kimmince~~^{1}; Erin Osborne; Ellyse Perry; Megan Schutt; Elyse Villani; Grace Harris^{1}

^{1} Delissa Kimmince was Replaced in the T20I squad by Grace Harris as she was unable to recover from a lower back issue.

== ODI series ==
=== 1st ODI ===
ICC Women's Championship
21 July
09:30 (UTC)
Scorecard

Australia; 238/9 (50 overs)	v	England; 240/6 (45.4 overs)
Ellyse Perry 78 (96); Katherine Brunt 3/48 (10 overs)		Nat Sciver 66 (75); Erin Osborne 3/39 (6.4 overs)

England won by 4 wickets
County Ground, Taunton
Umpires: Steve O'Shaughnessy (Eng) and Alex Wharf (Eng)
Player of the match: Nat Sciver (Eng)

- Australia won the toss and elected to bat.
- Ellyse Perry (Aus) passed 1,000 runs in ODIs.
- Ashes points: England Women 2, Australia Women 0.
- ICC Women's Championship points: England Women 2, Australia Women 0.

=== 2nd ODI ===
ICC Women's Championship
23 July
09:30 (UTC)
Scorecard

Australia; 259/6 (50 overs)	v	England; 196 (43 overs)
Meg Lanning 104 (98); Nat Sciver 2/27 (3 overs)		Charlotte Edwards 58 (85); Megan Schutt 4/47 (10 overs)

Australia won by 63 runs
County Ground, Bristol
Umpires: Steve O'Shaughnessy (Eng) and Martin Saggers (Eng)
Player of the match: Meg Lanning (Aus)

- England won the toss and elected to field.
- Ashes points: England Women 0, Australia Women 2.
- ICC Women's Championship points: England Women 0, Australia Women 2.

=== 3rd ODI ===
26 July
09:30 (UTC)
Scorecard

England	v	Australia

Match abandoned
New Road, Worcester
Umpires: Martin Saggers (Eng) and Alex Wharf (Eng)

- Due to rain the match was abandoned and moved to the reserve day.
- No toss had been made or teams announced.

ICC Women's Championship
27 July
09:30 (UTC)
Scorecard

Australia; 241/7 (50 overs)	v	England; 152 (43.1 overs)
Meg Lanning 85 (89); Jenny Gunn 2/52 (9 overs)		Lydia Greenway 45 (69); Kristen Beams 3/13 (4.1 overs)

Australia won by 89 runs
New Road, Worcester
Umpires: Martin Saggers (Eng) and Alex Wharf (Eng)
Player of the match: Ellyse Perry (Aus)

- England won the toss and elected to field.
- This is the rescheduled 3rd ODI.
- Ashes points: England Women 0, Australia Women 2.
- ICC Women's Championship points: England Women 0, Australia Women 2.

== Test series ==
=== Only Test ===
11–14 August
Scorecard

Australia	v	England
274/9d (101 overs); Jess Jonassen 99 (197); Anya Shrubsole 4/63 (25 overs)		168 (84.4 overs); Katherine Brunt 39 (73); Megan Schutt 4/26 (18.4 overs)
156/6d (55.5 overs); Jess Jonassen 54 (72); Katherine Brunt 2/41 (14 overs)		101 (59.1 overs); Georgia Elwiss 46 (118); Ellyse Perry 6/32 (13 overs)

Australia won by 161 runs
St Lawrence Ground, Canterbury
Umpires: Neil Mallender (Eng) and Alex Wharf (Eng)
Player of the match: Jess Jonassen (Aus)

- Australia won the toss and elected to bat.
- Rain stopped play on the morning session of day 3, with lunch taken early.
- Kristen Beams, Nicole Bolton, Jess Jonassen (all Aus) and Georgia Elwiss (Eng) made their Test debuts.
- Ashes points: England Women 0, Australia Women 4.

== T20I series ==
=== 1st T20I ===
26 August
18:00 (UTC) (D/N)
Scorecard

Australia; 122/8 (20 overs)	v	England; 125/3 (17.3 overs)
Ellyse Perry 30 (37); Nat Sciver 2/18 (4 overs)		Sarah Taylor 50 (43); Erin Osborne 2/22 (3 overs)

England won by 7 wickets
County Ground, Chelmsford
Umpires: Nick Cook (Eng) and Martin Saggers (Eng)
Player of the match: Sarah Taylor (Eng)

- England won the toss and elected to field.
- Ashes points: England Women 2, Australia Women 0.

=== 2nd T20I ===
28 August
18:00 (UTC) (D/N)
Scorecard

Australia; 107/7 (20 overs)	v	England; 87 (19.1 overs)
Jess Cameron 21* (17); Anya Shrubsole 2/9 (4 overs)		Lydia Greenway 26 (39); Rene Farrell 3/17 (3.1 overs)

Australia won by 20 runs
County Ground, Hove
Umpires: Nick Cook (Eng) and Peter Hartley (Eng)
Player of the match: Rene Farrell (Aus)

- England won the toss and elected to field.
- Ashes points: England Women 0, Australia Women 2.
- By winning this match, Australia Women regained the Ashes.

=== 3rd T20I ===
31 August
09:30 (UTC)
Scorecard

Australia; 111 (20 overs)	v	England; 114/5 (18.1 overs)
Grace Harris 24 (14); Anya Shrubsole 4/11 (4 overs)		Nat Sciver 47 (44); Rene Farrell 2/14 (4 overs)

England won by 5 wickets
Sophia Gardens, Cardiff
Umpires: Rob Bailey (Eng) and Richard Illingworth (Eng)
Player of the match: Nat Sciver (Eng)

- England won the toss and elected to field.
- Ashes points: England Women 2, Australia Women 0.

== Results ==
Match	Date	Result	Points won		Running total	
Match	Date	Result	England	Australia	England	Australia
ODI series
WODI 954	21 July	England by 4 wickets	2	0	2	0
WODI 955	23 July	Australia by 63 runs	0	2	2	2
WODI 956	27* July	Australia by 89 runs	0	2	2	4
Only Test
WTest 138	11–14 August	Australia by 161 runs	0	4	2	8
T20I series
WT20I 313	26 August	England by 7 wickets	2	0	4	8
WT20I 314	28 August	Australia by 20 runs	0	2	4	10
WT20I 315	31 August	England by 5 wickets	2	0	6	10

*Match was originally scheduled on 26 July but due to rain was abandoned and moved to the reserve day (27 July).

== Statistics ==
=== Batting ===
Most runs

Player	Team	Matches	Runs	Average	Highest	100	50
Ellyse Perry	Australia	7	264	33.00	78	0	2
Meg Lanning	Australia	7	249	31.12	104	1	1
Lydia Greenway	England	7	202	33.66	53	0	1
Jess Jonassen	Australia	7	200	25.00	99	0	2
Alex Blackwell	Australia	7	177	29.50	58	0	1

=== Bowling ===
Most wickets

Player	Team	Matches	Wickets	Runs	Average	BBI	4	5
Ellyse Perry	Australia	7	16	215	13.43	6/32	0	1
Anya Shrubsole	England	7	13	234	18.00	4/11	2	0
Megan Schutt	Australia	6	12	172	14.33	4/26	2	0
Sarah Coyte	Australia	7	10	218	21.80	2/15	0	0
Nat Sciver	England	7	9	158	17.55	4/15	1	0
