= Phillip Gillespie =

Australian cricket umpire (born 1975)

Personal information
- Full name: Phillip J. Gillespie
- Born: 23 October 1975 (age 51); Frankston, Victoria, Australia
- Role: Umpire

Umpiring information
- T20Is umpired: 28 (2022–2025)
- WTests umpired: 1 (2021)
- WODIs umpired: 15 (2014–2025)
- WT20Is umpired: 10 (2014–2026)
- Source: ESPNcricinfo, 12 October 2022

Phillip J. Gillespie (born 23 October 1975) is an Australian cricket umpire and former cricketer. A member of the Australian National Umpire Panel, Gillespie has umpired 6 Women's One Day International cricket matches, 10 first-class matches, 9 List A matches, 10 Twenty20 matches and 9 Women's Twenty20 matches as of March 2017.

== Career ==
He began his career in umpiring after suffering injuries to his Achilles tendon, jaw and knee whilst playing for Rowville Cricket Club in Melbourne. Wanting to stay in the game, he began umpiring in the Victorian Premier Cricket competition in 2009.

Making his List A debut in the fixture between the England Lions and Victoria during the February 2013 tour, he officiated in eight Matador BBQs One-Day Cup matches. Gillespie also umpired two Women's National Cricket League matches including the semi-final between New South Wales and Victoria in 2015.

Gillespie umpired six matches during the 2015–16 Big Bash League season and a further four the following season. In women's Twenty20, he umpired his first match during the 2012–13 Australian Women's Twenty20 Cup. He has also stood in Women's Big Bash League matches including the second semi final of the 2016–17 season where the Sydney Sixers defeated the Hobart Hurricanes at the Gabba.

He made his first-class debut on 15 February 2015 in the Sheffield Shield in the round 7 match between New South Wales and Victoria at Robertson Oval in Wagga Wagga where Doug Bollinger took a hat-trick from his end. He has since umpired a further nine matches with the latest the clash between Tasmania and Queensland at Bellerive Oval in March 2017.

Gillespie made his international umpiring debut during the West Indies women's cricket team tour of Australia in 2014, standing in all four WODI matches. Most recently, he umpired the final two WODIs of the South Africa in Australia WODI series in November 2016 at the Coffs Harbour International Stadium. In February 2017, he umpired three matches in the 2016–17 ICC World Cricket League East Asia–Pacific Region Qualifiers – Fiji versus the Philippines at the Queen Elizabeth Oval in Bendigo; the Philippines against Vanuatu at Canterbury Park in Eaglehawk and Fiji against Vanuatu at Dower Park in Kangaroo Flat.

Gillespie was accepted into the 2015 intake of the Australian Sports Commission National Officiating Scholarship program where he will undertake professional development and identified training activities to be able to officiate the elite level. In May 2015, he replaced Damien Mealey on the 2015–16 National Umpire Panel.

On 7 October 2022, he stood in his first Twenty20 International (T20I) match, between Australia and West Indies.

== Personal life ==
Gillespie was born 23 October 1975 in Frankston, an outer-suburb of Melbourne in Victoria, Australia. A supporter of the Richmond Tigers in the Australian Football League, his day job is a police officer in the Victorian Police Force.

== See also ==
- List of Twenty20 International cricket umpires
