= Imalka Mendis =

Sri Lankan cricketer (born 1993)

Personal information
- Full name: Hadunneththi Imalka Sanjeewani Mendis
- Born: 21 September 1993 (age 33); Balapituya, Sri Lanka
- Batting: Right-handed
- Bowling: Right arm medium

International information
- National side: Sri Lanka (2016-present)
- ODI debut (cap 67): 18 September 2016 v Australia
- Last ODI: 16 September 2018 v India
- T20I debut (cap 43): 28 March 2018 v Pakistan
- Last T20I: 26 March 2019 v England
- Source: ESPNcricinfo, 26 March 2019

Imalka Mendis (born 21 September 1993) is a Sri Lankan cricketer who plays for Sri Lanka's women's cricket team. She made her One Day International (ODI) debut against Australia on 18 September 2016. She made her Women's Twenty20 International cricket (WT20I) debut against Pakistan Women on 28 March 2018.
