= ICC Women's Championship =

International cricket tournament

- Administrator: International Cricket Council (ICC)
- Format: Women's One Day International
- First edition: 2014–16
- Latest edition: 2022–25
- Next edition: 2025–29
- Number of teams: 11
- Current champion: Australia (3rd title)
- Most successful: Australia (3 titles)

The ICC Women's Championship (IWC) is an international cricket tournament used to determine qualification for the Women's Cricket World Cup. The first two tournaments were contested between the top eight teams of the ICC Women's Rankings. The first edition was the 2014–16 ICC Women's Championship, which started in April 2014 and was concluded in November 2016. Australia were the winners of the inaugural tournament. The second edition of the tournament started in October 2017, with the top four teams automatically qualifying for the 2021 Women's Cricket World Cup.

In September 2018, the International Cricket Council (ICC) announced that they were exploring the option to expand the IWC to all ten teams, therefore including Bangladesh and Ireland in future editions of the competition. In August 2021, the ICC confirmed that the three qualifiers from the 2021 Women's Cricket World Cup Qualifier tournament and the next two best placed teams would qualify for the next IWC cycle. However, in November 2021, the qualifier tournament was called off midway through, due to the discovery of a new variant of COVID-19 in Southern Africa. Therefore, Bangladesh and Ireland joined the IWC for the 2022–25 cycle, based on their ODI rankings.

In August 2024, the ICC announced that Zimbabwe will be included in the 2025–2029 cycle of the Championship.

== Tournament history ==
=== Season ===
Year	Teams	Winners	Also qualified directly to World Cup	Advanced to World Cup Qualifier
2014–16	8	Australia	England; New Zealand; West Indies	India; South Africa; Pakistan; Sri Lanka
2017–20	8	Australia	England; South Africa; India; New Zealand	Pakistan; West Indies; Sri Lanka
2022–25	10	Australia	India; England; South Africa; Sri Lanka; New Zealand	Bangladesh; West Indies; Pakistan; Ireland
2025–29	11			

=== Teams ===
Team	2014–16 (8)	2017–20 (8)	2022–25 (10)	2025–29 (11)	Apps.
Australia	W			Q	4
Bangladesh	DNP		7th	Q	2
England	RU		3rd	Q	4
India	5th	4th	2nd	Q	4
Ireland	DNP		10th	Q	2
New Zealand	3rd	6th		Q	4
Pakistan	7th	5th	9th	Q	4
South Africa	6th	3rd	4th	Q	4
Sri Lanka	8th		5th	Q	4
West Indies	4th	7th	8th	Q	4
Zimbabwe	DNP			Q	1

Key:

W	Winner
RU	Runners-up
3rd	3rd Place
Q	Qualified
DNP	Did not play
