= Pakistan women's cricket team in England in 2016 =

International cricket tour

Pakistan Women cricket team in England in 2016
	England	Pakistan
- Dates: 20 June – 7 July
Captains	Heather Knight	Sana Mir (ODIs); Bismah Maroof (T20Is)

One Day International series
- Results: England won the 3-match series 3–0
Most runs	Tamsin Beaumont (342)	Bismah Maroof (107)
Most wickets	Katherine Brunt (9)	Asmavia Iqbal (4)

Twenty20 International series
- Results: England won the 3-match series 3–0
Most runs	Lauren Winfield (166)	Javeria Khan (60)
Most wickets	Jenny Gunn (5)	Nida Dar (5)

The Pakistan Women cricket team toured England in June–July 2016. The tour consisted of a three One Day Internationals (ODIs) matches series as well as three Twenty20 Internationals (T20Is) series. England won both series by 3–0.

== Squads ==
ODIs		T20Is	
England	Pakistan	England	Pakistan
Heather Knight (c); Anya Shrubsole (vc); Tammy Beaumont; Katherine Brunt; Kate Cross; Georgia Elwiss; Jenny Gunn; Alex Hartley; Danielle Hazell; Amy Jones (wk); Laura Marsh; Nat Sciver; Fran Wilson; Lauren Winfield; Danni Wyatt	Sana Mir (c); Aiman Anwer; Anam Amin; Asmavia Iqbal; Bismah Maroof (vc); Iram Javed; Javeria Khan; Muneeba Ali; Nahida Khan; Nain Abidi; Nida Dar; Sadia Yousuf; Sania Khan; Sidra Ameen; Sidra Nawaz (wk)	Heather Knight (c); Tammy Beaumont; Katherine Brunt; Sophie Ecclestone; Georgia Elwiss; Natasha Farrant; Jenny Gunn; Alex Hartley; Danielle Hazell; Amy Jones (wk); Laura Marsh; Nat Sciver; Fran Wilson; Lauren Winfield; Danni Wyatt	Bismah Maroof (c); Aiman Anwer; Anam Amin; Asmavia Iqbal; Iram Javed; Javeria Khan; Muneeba Ali; Nahida Khan; Nain Abidi; Nida Dar; Sadia Yousuf; Sana Mir; Sania Khan; Sidra Ameen; Sidra Nawaz (wk)

== ODI series ==
=== 1st ODI ===
ICC Women's Championship
20–21 June
14:00 BST
(UTC+1) (D/N)
Scorecard

Pakistan; 165 (45.4 overs)	v	England; 166/3 (31.5 overs)
Sidra Ameen 52 (79); Heather Knight 5/26 (8.4 overs)		Tamsin Beaumont 70 (75); Asmavia Iqbal 2/49 (6.5 overs)

England won by 7 wickets
Grace Road, Leicester
Umpires: Martin Saggers (Eng) and Alex Wharf (Eng)
Player of the match: Heather Knight (Eng)

- England won the toss and elected to field.
- Rain prevented any play taking place on 20 June, therefore the match was moved to the reserve day (21 June).
- Katherine Brunt (Eng) took her 100th ODI wicket.
- Heather Knight (Eng) became the first female player to take a five-wicket haul and score a half-century in an ODI.
- ICC Women's Championship points: England Women 2, Pakistan Women 0

=== 2nd ODI ===
ICC Women's Championship
22 June
10:30 BST
(UTC+1)
Scorecard

England; 378/5 (50 overs)	v	Pakistan; 166 (47.4 overs)
Lauren Winfield 123 (117); Maham Tariq 2/63 (10 overs)		Bismah Maroof 61 (81); Anya Shrubsole 4/19 (8.4 overs)

England won by 212 runs
New Road, Worcester
Umpires: David Millns (Eng) and Martin Saggers (Eng)
Player of the match: Tamsin Beaumont (Eng) and Lauren Winfield (Eng)

- Pakistan won the toss and elected to field.
- This was England's highest total in an ODI match.
- Tammy Beaumont scored her maiden ODI century
- ICC Women's Championship points: England Women 2, Pakistan Women 0

=== 3rd ODI ===
ICC Women's Championship
27 June
10:30 BST
(UTC+1)
Scorecard

England; 366/4 (50 overs)	v	Pakistan; 164 (44.5 overs)
Tamsin Beaumont 168* (144); Sana Mir 2/69 (9 overs)		Sidra Nawaz 47 (68); Katherine Brunt 5/30 (9.5 overs)

England won by 202 runs
County Ground, Taunton
Umpires: David Millns (Eng) and Martin Saggers (Eng)
Player of the match: Tamsin Beaumont (Eng)

- England won the toss and elected to bat.
- Alex Hartley (Eng) made her ODI debut.
- ICC Women's Championship points: England Women 2, Pakistan Women 0

== T20I series ==
=== 1st T20I ===
3 July
14:30 BST
(UTC+1)
Scorecard

England; 187/5 (20 overs)	v	Pakistan; 119/7 (20 overs)
Tamsin Beaumont 82 (53); Nida Dar 2/28 (4 overs)		Asmavia Iqbal 35 (27); Danielle Hazell 2/18 (4 overs)

England won by 68 runs
County Ground, Bristol
Umpires: Michael Gough (Eng) and Tim Robinson (Eng)
Player of the match: Tamsin Beaumont (Eng)

- England won the toss and elected to bat.
- Sophie Ecclestone (Eng) made her T20I debut.
- This was England's highest total in a T20I match.

=== 2nd T20I ===
5 July
14:00 BST
(UTC+1)
Scorecard

England; 138/7 (20 overs)	v	Pakistan; 103 (19.4 overs)
Fran Wilson 43* (39); Bismah Maroof 2/19 (4 overs)		Javeria Khan 23 (17); Jenny Gunn 2/7 (4 overs)

England won by 35 runs
The Rose Bowl, Southampton
Umpires: Nick Cook (Eng) and Tim Robinson (Eng)
Player of the match: Fran Wilson (Eng)

- England won the toss and elected to bat.
- Aiman Anwer (Pak) made her T20I debut.

=== 3rd T20I ===
7 July
18:30 BST
(UTC+1) (D/N)
Scorecard

England; 170/5 (20 overs)	v	Pakistan; 113/7 (20 overs)
Lauren Winfield 63 (40); Nida Dar 2/23 (4 overs)		Bismah Maroof 35 (41); Alex Hartley 2/19 (3 overs)

England won by 57 runs
County Ground, Chelmsford
Umpires: David Millns (Eng) and Martin Saggers (Eng)
Player of the match: Lauren Winfield (Eng)

- England won the toss and elected to bat.
- Alex Hartley (Eng) made her T20I debut.
