= Moseline Daniels =

South African cricketer (born 1990)

Personal information
- Full name: Moseline Rochelle Daniels
- Born: 1 February 1990 (age 36); Paarl, South Africa
- Batting: Left-handed
- Bowling: Left-arm medium
- Role: Bowler

International information
- National side: South Africa (2010–2019)
- ODI debut (cap 57): 6 October 2010 v Sri Lanka
- Last ODI: 18 July 2017 v England
- ODI shirt no.: 15
- T20I debut (cap 24): 14 October 2010 v Netherlands
- Last T20I: 23 May 2019 v Pakistan

Domestic team information
- Years: Team
- 2005/06–2011/12: Boland
- 2012/13–2013/14: Western Province
- 2014/15–2017/18: Boland
- 2018/19: Border
- 2019/20–2020/21: Boland

Career statistics
Competition	WODI	WT20I	WLA	WT20
Matches	33	40	114	57
Runs scored	40	20	610	114
Batting average	10.00	5.00	17.42	8.76
100s/50s	0/0	0/0	0/1	0/0
Top score	11*	8*	51*	20*
Balls bowled	1,397	801	4,598	1,141
Wickets	28	28	148	41
Bowling average	33.25	23.63	15.82	21.41
5 wickets in innings	0	0	3	0
10 wickets in match	0	0	0	0
Best bowling	4/25	3/13	8/36	3/6
Catches/stumpings	10/–	8/–	38/–	10/–
- Source: CricketArchive, 17 February 2022

Moseline Daniels (born 1 February 1990) is a South African cricketer who plays as a left-arm medium bowler. She played 33 One Day Internationals and 40 Twenty20 Internationals for South Africa between 2010 and 2019. In March 2018, she was one of fourteen players to be awarded a national contract by Cricket South Africa ahead of the 2018–19 season.

In November 2018, she was added to South Africa's squad for the 2018 ICC Women's World Twenty20 tournament in the West Indies. In September 2019, she was named in the F van der Merwe XI squad for the inaugural edition of the Women's T20 Super League in South Africa.
