= Rebecca Grundy =

English cricketer and coach (born 1990)

Personal information
- Full name: Rebecca Louise Grundy
- Born: 12 July 1990 (age 36); Solihull, England
- Batting: Left-handed
- Bowling: Slow left-arm orthodox
- Role: Bowler

International information
- National side: England (2014–2016)
- ODI debut (cap 126): 11 February 2015 v New Zealand
- Last ODI: 7 February 2016 v South Africa
- T20I debut (cap 39): 24 March 2014 v West Indies
- Last T20I: 24 March 2016 v West Indies

Domestic team information
- Years: Team
- 2007–2018: Warwickshire
- 2009/10–2010/11: South Western Districts
- 2016–2017: Loughborough Lightning
- 2016/17: Perth Scorchers

Career statistics
Competition	WODI	WT20I	WLA	WT20
Matches	7	12	92	72
Runs scored	3	4	436	121
Batting average	3.00	2.00	9.68	6.36
100s/50s	0/0	0/0	0/0	0/0
Top score	1*	2*	32	12
Balls bowled	408	264	4,657	1,487
Wickets	9	11	127	91
Bowling average	31.22	21.63	1840	13.78
5 wickets in innings	0	0	1	1
10 wickets in match	0	0	0	–
Best bowling	3/36	2/13	6/5	5/10
Catches/stumpings	0/0	4/0	15/–	24/–
- Source: ESPNcricinfo, 23 November 2020

Rebecca Louise Grundy (born 12 July 1990) is an English cricketer and coach, who played for her national cricket team and is now head coach of the Western Australia team. Grundy is a left-arm spin bowler.

== Playing career ==
Grundy has played for Warwickshire. In 2014, Grundy was part of the England Academy squad. Grundy was brought into the England squad for the 2014 ICC Women's World Twenty20 in Bangladesh. On pitches that generally help spin bowlers, Grundy made her England debut in the opening fixture of the tournament and retained her place through all the group matches. She was the holder of one of the first tranche of 18 ECB central contracts for women players, which were announced in April 2014. Grundy was called up for the summer series against India and South Africa, which included her first Women's Test match and Women's One Day International callups. She later had to withdraw from the series with a groin injury. She played for England in the 2015 Women's Ashes series. Grundy was in the squad for the 2016 ICC Women's World Twenty20.

In total, Grundy made 21 appearances for England, and her last appearance for England was in 2016. At the end of 2016, she lost her central contract. Grundy played for Perth Scorchers in the 2016–17 Women's Big Bash League season, as a replacement for the injured Anya Shrubsole.

Grundy's nicknames are "Grunners" and "Carol". In 2015, she explained to sports journalist Clare Balding that the latter nickname was "as in Vorderman – we played Countdown on tour and I was in Carol’s position at the board."

== Coaching career ==
Grundy worked as a development coach for the Western Australia women's cricket team. Whilst Grundy was a coach there, Western Australia won the 2019–20 Women's National Cricket League. In May 2020, she was named as the head coach of Western Australia. She was signed on a two-year contract.
