= Chathurani Gunawardene =

Sri Lankan cricketer

Personal information
- Full name: Madampala Gunarathna Mudiyanselage Chathurani Prithimali Gunawardene
- Born: 31 December 1990 (age 35); Kuliyapitiya, Kurunegala District, Sri Lanka
- Batting: Left-handed
- Bowling: Right-arm medium-fast
- Role: All-rounder

International information
- National side: Sri Lanka
- ODI debut (cap 62): 13 May 2015 v West Indies
- Last ODI: 15 May 2015 v West Indies
- T20I debut (cap 37): 15 January 2015 v Pakistan
- Last T20I: 27 September 2016 v Australia

Career statistics
Competition	ODI	T20I
Matches	2	5
Runs scored	12	30
Batting average	12.00	10.00
100s/50s	0/0	0/0
Top score	9*	14
Balls bowled	6	90
Wickets	0	3
Bowling average	–	33.66
5 wickets in innings	–	0
10 wickets in match	–	0
Best bowling	–	2/25
Catches/stumpings	0/–	0/–
- Source: CricInfo, 28 January 2020

Chathurani Gunawardene (born 31 December 1990) is a professional Sri Lankan international cricketer. An all-rounder, she is a left-handed batter and a right-arm medium-fast bowler. Chathurani made her ODI debut for Sri Lanka during the Pakistan cricket team toured Sri Lanka in 2015. T20 debut for Sri Lanka during the West Indies cricket team toured Sri Lanka in 2015. She also played matches Kurunegala Youth Cricket Club. She only played 2 ODI matches and 5 T20 matches. Poor batting and bowling performance she failed to take a wicket in seven matches remain.
