= Odine Kirsten =

South African cricketer (born 1994)

Personal information
- Full name: Odine Kirsten
- Born: 28 July 1994 (age 32); Johannesburg, South Africa
- Batting: Right-handed
- Bowling: Right-arm medium
- Role: All-rounder

International information
- National side: South Africa (2016–2017)
- ODI debut (cap 75): 5 August 2016 v Ireland
- Last ODI: 20 January 2017 v Bangladesh
- T20I debut (cap 41): 4 March 2016 v West Indies
- Last T20I: 6 March 2016 v West Indies

Domestic team information
- Years: Team
- 2010/11–2013/14: Easterns
- 2013/14–2017/18: Northerns

Career statistics
Competition	WODI	WT20I	WLA	WT20
Matches	9	2	54	24
Runs scored	35	5	688	300
Batting average	11.66	5.00	17.64	27.27
100s/50s	0/0	0/0	0/1	0/0
Top score	22*	3	58*	37*
Balls bowled	402	30	2,238	426
Wickets	9	1	60	17
Bowling average	29.88	45.00	22.41	23.11
5 wickets in innings	0	0	2	0
10 wickets in match	0	0	0	0
Best bowling	4/10	1/26	5/17	4/9
Catches/stumpings	4/–	1/–	23/–	11/–
- Source: CricketArchive, 22 February 2022

Odine Kirsten (born 28 July 1994) is a South African former cricketer who played as a right-arm medium bowler and right-handed batter. She appeared in nine One Day Internationals and two Twenty20 Internationals for South Africa in 2016 and 2017. She played domestic cricket for Easterns and Northerns.
