= Vellaswamy Vanitha =

Indian cricketer

Personal information
- Full name: Vellaswamy Vanitha
- Born: 19 July 1990 (age 36); Bangalore, Karnataka, India
- Batting: Right-handed
- Bowling: Right-arm medium
- Role: Batter

International information
- National side: India (2014–2016)
- ODI debut (cap 111): 23 January 2014 v Sri Lanka
- Last ODI: 28 November 2014 v South Africa
- T20I debut (cap 44): 25 January 2014 v Sri Lanka
- Last T20I: 22 November 2016 v West Indies

Domestic team information
- Years: Team
- 2006/07–2020/21: Karnataka
- 2021/22: Bengal

Career statistics
Competition	WODI	WT20I
Matches	16	6
Runs scored	216	85
Batting average	14.40	17.00
100s/50s	0/0	0/0
Top score	41	27
Catches/stumpings	5/–	1/–
- Source: Cricinfo, 20 April 2020

Vellaswamy Vanitha (born 19 July 1990) is an Indian kannada cricket commentator and former cricketer. She played as an opening batter from Karnataka. In January 2014, she made her Women's One Day International (WODI) and Women's Twenty20 International (WT20I) debuts, against Sri Lanka. In February 2022, she retired from all forms of cricket.

== Personal life ==
Vanitha has two sisters and a brother, and her family has been very supportive of her career choice. She used to train with boys at a coaching camp. Her father was the one who took her to the Karnataka Institute of Cricket when she was 11. As a child she often used to play gully cricket with her father and brother which helped in laying a strong foundation for love of cricket very early in her life.

Vanitha studied at Seventh Day Adventist, Bangalore. Later, she studied at CMR Law School as well as MS Ramaiah College of Law. Apart from being a cricketer, she is also an entrepreneur. She launched Orgobliss in 2013, along with her brother.

== Career ==
Vanitha made her debut for Karnataka women's cricket team in 2006. Her coach and mentor Irfan Sait has played an instrumental role in inculcating the required cricketing skills in her. Dilip, Naseer, Anant Dante and Rajini are the other coaches who helped her in raising her game at different points of her career.
