= Prasadani Weerakkody =

Sri Lankan cricketer (born 1988)

Personal information
- Full name: Prasadani Maheshika Weerakkody
- Born: 13 November 1988 (age 37); Kurunegala, Sri Lanka
- Batting: Left-handed
- Role: Wicket-keeper

International information
- National side: Sri Lanka
- ODI debut (cap 50): 14 November 2011 v South Africa
- Last ODI: 3 June 2022 v Pakistan
- T20I debut (cap 25): 1 May 2012 v West Indies
- Last T20I: 6 February 2019 v South Africa

Career statistics
Competition	WODI	WT20I
Matches	53	27
Runs scored	909	303
Batting average	17.48	13.17
100s/50s	0/2	0/0
Top score	69	48
Catches/stumpings	39/16	8/11
- Source: Cricinfo, 3 June 2022

Prasadani Maheshika Weerakkody (born 13 November 1988) is a Sri Lankan cricketer who has played in 43 women's One Day Internationals and 25 Twenty20 internationals. In October 2021, she was named in Sri Lanka's team for the 2021 Women's Cricket World Cup Qualifier tournament in Zimbabwe. She was part of the Sri Lankan team for the 2022 Commonwealth Games Cricket Qualifier tournament in Malaysia.
