= Kristen Beams =

Australian cricketer

Personal information
- Full name: Kristen Maree Beams
- Born: 6 November 1984 (age 42); Launceston, Tasmania, Australia
- Batting: Right-handed
- Bowling: Legbreak, googly
- Role: Bowler

International information
- National side: Australia (2014–2017)
- Only Test (cap 168): 11 August 2015 v England
- ODI debut (cap 128): 26 August 2014 v Pakistan
- Last ODI: 26 October 2017 v England
- T20I debut (cap 39): 3 September 2014 v Pakistan
- Last T20I: 22 February 2017 v New Zealand

Domestic team information
- Years: Team
- 2007/08–2019/20: Victoria
- 2013: Essex
- 2015/16–2019/20: Melbourne Stars
- 2017: Loughborough Lightning

Career statistics
Competition	Test	ODI	T20I	LA
Matches	1	30	18	112
Runs scored	26	34	6	334
Batting average	–	6.80	6.00	12.37
100s/50s	0/0	0/0	0/0	0/1
Top score	26*	11*	4*	59*
Balls bowled	66	1,490	378	5,199
Wickets	0	42	20	157
Bowling average	–	22.45	16.60	20.91
5 wickets in innings	–	0	0	5
10 wickets in match	–	0	0	0
Best bowling	–	4/15	3/11	6/20
Catches/stumpings	0/–	10/–	4/–	45/–
- Source: CricketArchive, 6 August 2025

Kristen Maree Beams (born 6 November 1984) is an Australian former cricket player. Beams played one Test, thirty One Day Internationals and eighteen Twenty20 Internationals for the Australia national women's cricket team between 2014 and 2017.

== Cricket career ==
Beams began her domestic cricket career playing for Victoria in the Women's National Cricket League (WNCL). In the 2013–14 WNCL season, she took 14 wickets at an average of 13.21 to lead the wicket-takers for the competition. During the season she also played tour matches against the visiting English team. In July 2014, she was added into the Australian national team's squad for the first time, ahead of a series against Pakistan. During the series, she made both her One Day International (ODI) and Twenty20 International (T20I) debuts, on 26 August and 3 September respectively. She starred in the following series against the West Indies when, in just her third T20I, she took three wickets and had the best bowling figures for the Australian team.

In June 2015, she was named as one of Australia's touring party for the 2015 Women's Ashes in England, putting her in line for a Test cricket debut. She played her first and only Test match against England at St Lawrence Ground, starting on 11 August 2015. She scored 26 runs without being dismissed in her sole batting innings, but only bowled 11 overs for the match and did not take any wickets.

Beams had a strong year in 2016, and was Australia's leading wicket-taker in ODIs for the year up to November 2016. In Australia's tour of Sri Lanka, she took 13 wickets at a "stunning" average of 5.92, and took her career best figures in both ODIs (4/15) and T20Is (3/11). In an ODI against South Africa in November 2016, Beams bowled four overs before breaking her finger. She left the field for medical treatment, but with her finger still broken she returned to the field and bowled two more overs, taking the wicket of Lizelle Lee. After the match she was ruled out of the rest of the series due to the injury.

Beams continued to play for Australia through 2017. She was Australia's leading wicket taker in the 2017 Women's Cricket World Cup in England, but in the Australian summer she only played one match in the ODI portion of the 2017–18 Ashes series. She was dropped from the team altogether for the sole Test match of the series when Australia opted to go with only one spin bowler (Amanda-Jade Wellington).

In March 2018, following the conclusion of the 2017–18 Women's National Cricket League season, Cricket Victoria named her the player of the season, awarding her the Sharon Tredrea Award, but in April 2018 the national team chose not to renew her contract, and she never returned to the national team. On 1 December 2019, she announced her retirement from cricket.
