= Nipuni Hansika =

Sri Lankan cricketer (born 1994)

Personal information
- Full name: Manage Don Nipuni Hansika
- Born: 3 August 1994 (age 32); Dehiwala, Sri Lanka
- Batting: Left-handed
- Bowling: Right arm medium-fast

International information
- National side: Sri Lanka
- ODI debut (cap 54): 24 February 2013 v West Indies
- Last ODI: 13 September 2018 v India
- ODI shirt no.: 25
- T20I debut (cap 31): 7 March 2013 v West Indies
- Last T20I: 7 June 2018 v India

Career statistics
Competition	WODI	WT20I
Matches	34	20
Runs scored	544	189
Batting average	16.48	9.44
100s/50s	0/1	0/0
Top score	50*	24
Catches/stumpings	5/–	2/–
- Source: Cricinfo, 16 September 2021

Manage Don Nipuni Hansika (born 3 August 1994) is a Sri Lankan cricketer who plays for Sri Lanka's women's cricket team. A left-handed batter, Hansika made her One Day International (ODI) debut against the West Indies on 24 February 2013, and her Twenty20 International debut against the same opposition a fortnight later.
