= Sugandika Kumari =

Sri Lankan cricketer

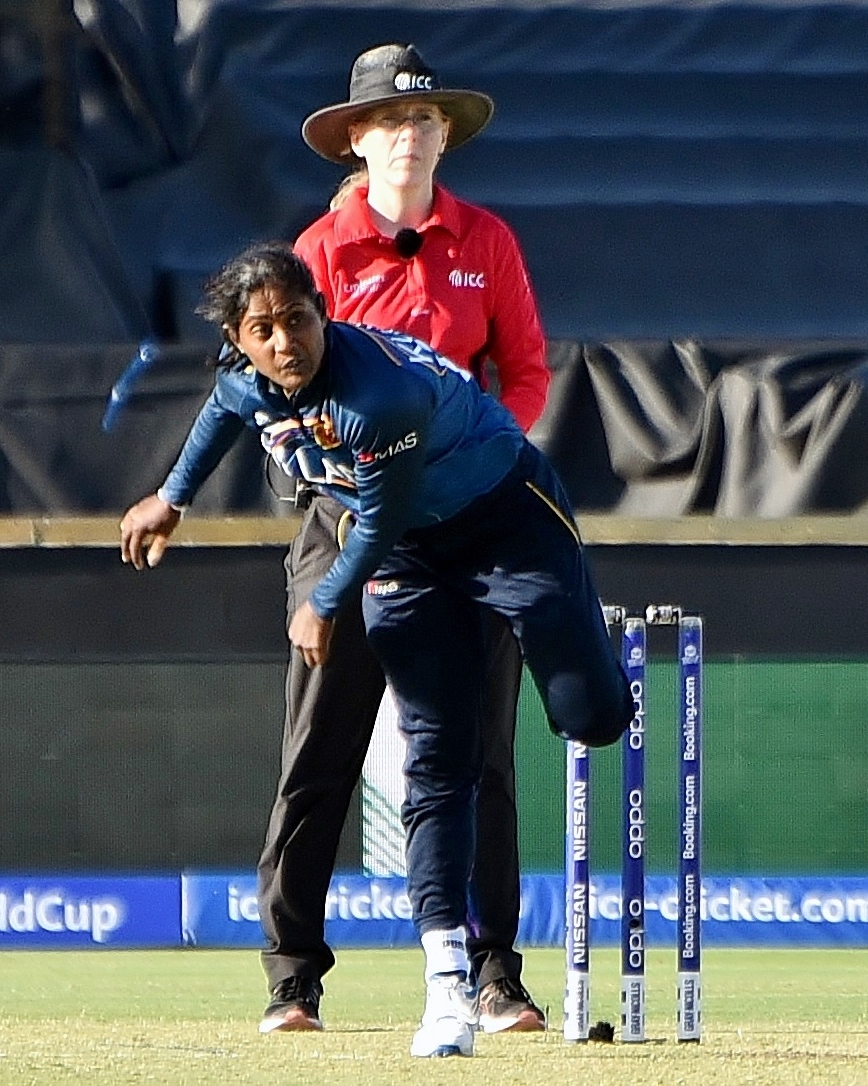
- Kumari bowling for Sri Lanka during the 2020 ICC Women's T20 World Cup

Personal information
- Full name: Dasanayaka Mudiyanselage Sugandika Manel Kumari
- Born: 5 October 1991 (age 35); Anamaduwa, Sri Lanka
- Batting: Left-handed
- Bowling: Left arm orthodox

International information
- National side: Sri Lanka
- ODI debut (cap 61): 11 January 2015 v Pakistan
- Last ODI: 5 June 2022 v Pakistan
- T20I debut (cap 38): 15 January 2015 v Pakistan
- Last T20I: 6 September 2023 v England
- T20I shirt no.: 91
Medal record
Women's cricket
Representing Sri Lanka
Asia Cup
Winner	2024 Sri Lanka
Runner-up	2026 UAE
Asian Games
Silver medal – second place	2022 Hangzhou
Silver medal – second place	2026 Aichi–Nagoya	Team
- Source: ESPNcricinfo, 19 February 2023

Dasanayaka Mudiyanselage Sugandika Manel Kumari (born 5 October 1991), known as Sugandika Kumari, is a Sri Lankan cricketer who plays for the women's national cricket team. She made her One Day International (ODI) and Twenty20 International (T20I) debut against Pakistan in January 2015.

In October 2018, she was named in Sri Lanka's squad for the 2018 ICC Women's World Twenty20 tournament in the West Indies. In January 2020, she was named in Sri Lanka's squad for the 2020 ICC Women's T20 World Cup in Australia. In October 2021, she was named in Sri Lanka's team for the 2021 Women's Cricket World Cup Qualifier tournament in Zimbabwe. In January 2022, she was named in Sri Lanka's team for the 2022 Commonwealth Games Cricket Qualifier tournament in Malaysia. She was also part of the Sri Lanka squad for the cricket tournament at the 2022 Commonwealth Games in Birmingham, England, and for the 2024 ICC Women's T20 World Cup.
