= South Africa women's cricket team in Pakistan in 2025–26 =

International cricket tour

	Pakistan	South Africa
- Dates: 16 – 22 September 2025
Captains	Fatima Sana	Laura Wolvaardt

One Day International series
- Results: South Africa won the 3-match series 2–1
Most runs	Sidra Ameen (289)	Tazmin Brits (272)
Most wickets	Nashra Sandhu (6)	Nadine de Klerk (5)
- Player of the series: Tazmin Brits (SA)

The South Africa women's cricket team toured Pakistan in September 2025 to play the Pakistan women's cricket team. The tour consisted of three One Day International (ODI) matches. The series formed part of both teams' preparation ahead of the 2025 Women's Cricket World Cup tournament. All the matches were played at the Gaddafi Stadium in Lahore. In July 2025, the Pakistan Cricket Board (PCB) confirmed the fixtures for the tour.

== Squads ==
Pakistan	South Africa
Fatima Sana (c); Muneeba Ali (vc, wk); Sidra Ameen; Diana Baig; Eyman Fatima; Sadia Iqbal; Sidra Nawaz (wk); Natalia Pervaiz; Aliya Riaz; Syeda Aroob Shah; Nashra Sandhu; Sadaf Shamas; Rameen Shamim; Omaima Sohail; Shawaal Zulfiqar	Laura Wolvaardt (c); Anneke Bosch; Tazmin Brits; Nadine de Klerk; Annerie Dercksen; Sinalo Jafta (wk); Marizanne Kapp; Ayabonga Khaka; Masabata Klaas; Suné Luus; Karabo Meso (wk); Nonkululeko Mlaba; Tumi Sekhukhune; Nondumiso Shangase; Miané Smit; Chloe Tryon

== ODI series ==
=== 1st ODI ===
16 September 2025
15:30 (D/N)
Scorecard

Pakistan; 255/4 (50 overs)	v	South Africa; 259/2 (48.2 overs)
Sidra Ameen 121* (150); Ayabonga Khaka 2/36 (9 overs)		Marizanne Kapp 121* (128); Rameen Shamim 1/29 (10 overs)

South Africa won by 8 wickets
Gaddafi Stadium, Lahore
Umpires: Saleema Imtiaz (Pak) and Claire Polosak (Aus)
Player of the match: Marizanne Kapp (SA)

- Pakistan won the toss and elected to bat.
- Sidra Ameen (Pak) scored her 2,000th run in ODIs.
- Tazmin Brits (SA) scored her 3,000th run in international cricket.

=== 2nd ODI ===
19 September 2025
15:30 (D/N)
Scorecard

South Africa; 292/3 (46 overs)	v	Pakistan; 287 (44.4 overs)
Tazmin Brits 171* (141); Diana Baig 2/45 (5 overs)		Sidra Ameen 122 (110); Nadine de Klerk 3/45 (6.4 overs)

South Africa won by 25 runs (DLS method)
Gaddafi Stadium, Lahore
Umpires: Claire Polosak (Aus) and Tariq Rasheed (Pak)
Player of the match: Tazmin Brits (SA)

- Pakistan won the toss and elected to field.
- South Africa's innings was interrupted at 41 overs due to rain. The match was then reduced to 46 overs per side.
- Pakistan were set a revised target of 313 runs in 46 overs.
- Laura Wolvaardt and Tazmin Brits' 260-run partnership was South Africa's highest for any wicket in ODIs, breaking the record of 243 between the same pair against Bangladesh in 2023.

=== 3rd ODI ===
22 September 2025
15:30 (D/N)
Scorecard

South Africa; 115 (25.5 overs)	v	Pakistan; 117/4 (31 overs)
Laura Wolvaardt 28 (23); Nashra Sandhu 6/26 (9 overs)		Sidra Ameen 50* (94); Nadine de Klerk 2/19 (5 overs)

Pakistan won by 6 wickets
Gaddafi Stadium, Lahore
Umpires: Saleema Imtiaz (Pak) and Claire Polosak (Aus)
Player of the match: Nashra Sandhu (Pak)

- South Africa won the toss and elected to bat.
- Eyman Fatima (Pak) made her ODI debut.
- Nashra Sandhu (Pak) took her 100th wicket and her first five-wicket haul in ODIs.
