= Ireland women's cricket team in South Africa in 2025–26 =

International cricket tour

	South Africa	Ireland
- Dates: 5 – 19 December 2025
Captains	Laura Wolvaardt	Gaby Lewis

One Day International series
- Results: South Africa won the 3-match series 3–0
Most runs	Laura Wolvaardt (255)	Orla Prendergast (146)
Most wickets	Nonkululeko Mlaba (7)	Aimee Maguire (4)
- Player of the series: Laura Wolvaardt (SA)

Twenty20 International series
- Results: South Africa won the 3-match series 2–0
Most runs	Laura Wolvaardt (137)	Leah Paul (74)
Most wickets	Suné Luus (4); Chloe Tryon (4)	Aimee Maguire (3)

The Ireland women's cricket team toured South Africa in December 2025 to play the South Africa women's cricket team. The tour consisted of three One Day International (ODI) and three Twenty20 International (T20I) matches. In March 2025, the Cricket South Africa (CSA) confirmed the fixtures for the tour, as a part of the 2025 home international season.

== Squads ==
South Africa		Ireland	
ODIs	T20Is	ODIs	T20Is
Laura Wolvaardt (c); Tazmin Brits; Lara Goodall; Ayanda Hlubi; Sinalo Jafta (wk); Leah Jones; Suné Luus; Eliz-Mari Marx; Karabo Meso (wk); Nonkululeko Mlaba; Tumi Sekhukhune; Nondumiso Shangase; Miané Smit; Faye Tunnicliffe; Dane van Niekerk	Laura Wolvaardt (c); Nadine de Klerk; Annerie Dercksen; Sinalo Jafta (wk); Marizanne Kapp; Ayabonga Khaka; Masabata Klaas; Suné Luus; Karabo Meso (wk); Nonkululeko Mlaba; Seshnie Naidu; Nondumiso Shangase; Chloe Tryon; Faye Tunnicliffe; Dane van Niekerk	Gaby Lewis (c); Ava Canning; Christina Coulter Reilly; Laura Delany; Georgina Dempsey; Sarah Forbes; Amy Hunter (wk); Arlene Kelly; Aimee Maguire; Jane Maguire; Lara McBride; Cara Murray; Leah Paul; Orla Prendergast; Rebecca Stokell	Gaby Lewis (c); Ava Canning; Christina Coulter Reilly; Alana Dalzell; Laura Delany; Amy Hunter (wk); Arlene Kelly; Louise Little; Aimee Maguire; Jane Maguire; Lara McBride; Cara Murray; Leah Paul; Orla Prendergast; Rebecca Stokell

== T20I series ==
=== 1st T20I ===
5 December 2025
14:00
Scorecard

South Africa; 220/2 (20 overs)	v	Ireland; 115 (18 overs)
Laura Wolvaardt 115* (56); Ava Canning 1/33 (4 overs)		Leah Paul 34 (23); Suné Luus 4/22 (4 overs)

South Africa won by 105 runs
Newlands Cricket Ground, Cape Town
Umpires: Kerrin Klaaste (SA) and Vrinda Rathi (Ind)
Player of the match: Laura Wolvaardt (SA)

- South Africa won the toss and elected to bat.

=== 2nd T20I ===
7 December 2025
14:00
Scorecard

South Africa; 201/5 (20 overs)	v	Ireland; 136/3 (20 overs)
Faye Tunnicliffe 51 (42); Aimee Maguire 3/43 (4 overs)		Orla Prendergast 51* (43); Chloe Tryon 2/24 (4 overs)

South Africa won by 65 runs
Boland Park, Paarl
Umpires: Stacy Lackay (SA) and Vrinda Rathi (Ind)
Player of the match: Faye Tunnicliffe (SA)

- South Africa won the toss and elected to bat.

=== 3rd T20I ===
10 December 2025
18:00 (N)
Scorecard

South Africa	v	Ireland

Match abandoned
Willowmoore Park, Benoni
Umpires: Lauren Agenbag (SA) and Vrinda Rathi (Ind)

- No toss.
- No play was possible due to rain.

== ODI series ==
=== 1st ODI ===
13 December 2025
10:00
Scorecard

Ireland; 209/7 (47 overs)	v	South Africa; 211/3 (36.5 overs)
Sarah Forbes 42 (71); Nonkululeko Mlaba 3/43 (10 overs)		Suné Luus 66* (72); Cara Murray 2/34 (6 overs)

South Africa won by 7 wickets
Buffalo Park, East London
Umpires: Stacy Lackay (SA) and Vrinda Rathi (Ind)
Player of the match: Suné Luus (South Africa)

- Ireland won the toss and elected to bat.
- The match was reduced to 47 overs per side due to rain.

=== 2nd ODI ===
16 December 2025
10:00
Scorecard

South Africa; 375/6 (50 overs)	v	Ireland; 301 (47.5 overs)
Laura Wolvaardt 124 (111); Jane Maguire 3/75 (10 overs)		Orla Prendergast 97 (86); Leah Jones 3/48 (6.5 overs)

South Africa won by 74 runs
St George's Park, Gqeberha
Umpires: Kerrin Klaaste (SA) and Vrinda Rathi (Ind)
Player of the match: Laura Wolvaardt (SA)

- South Africa won the toss and elected to bat.
- Leah Jones (SA) made her ODI debut.
- This was the first women's ODI to be played at this venue.

=== 3rd ODI ===
19 December 2025
14:00 (D/N)
Scorecard

Ireland; 205 (45.2 overs)	v	South Africa; 206/4 (32.2 overs)
Gaby Lewis 64 (80); Nonkululeko Mlaba 4/33 (9 overs)		Laura Wolvaardt 100* (93); Arlene Kelly 2/34 (8 overs)

South Africa won by 6 wickets
Wanderers Stadium, Johannesburg
Umpires: Lauren Agenbag (SA) and Vrinda Rathi (Ind)
Player of the match: Laura Wolvaardt (SA)

- Ireland won the toss and elected to bat.
