= South Africa women's cricket team in Zimbabwe in 2026 =

International cricket tour

	Zimbabwe	South Africa
- Dates: 11 – 19 September 2026
Captains	Josephine Nkomo	Laura Wolvaardt

Twenty20 International series
- Results: South Africa won the 5-match series 5–0
Most runs	Michelle Mavunga (110)	Anneke Bosch (214)
Most wickets	Michelle Mavunga (5)	Annerie Dercksen (7); Nthabiseng Nini (7)
- Player of the series: Anneke Bosch (SA)

The South Africa women's cricket team toured Zimbabwe in September 2026 to play against the Zimbabwe women's cricket team. The tour consisted of five Twenty20 International (T20I) matches. In May 2026, Zimbabwe Cricket (ZC) confirmed the fixtures for the tour.

== Squads ==
Zimbabwe	South Africa
Josephine Nkomo (c); Beloved Biza; Kudzai Chigora; Francisca Chipare; Nyasha Gwanzura; Lindokuhle Mabhera; Tendai Makusha; Michelle Mavunga; Sharne Mayers; Modester Mupachikwa (wk); Chipo Mugeri-Tiripano; Christina Mutasa; Kelis Ndhlovu; Lorraine Pemhiwa; Loryn Phiri; Nomvelo Sibanda; Loreen Tshuma	Laura Wolvaardt (c); Anneke Bosch; Annerie Dercksen; Ayanda Hlubi; Sinalo Jafta (wk); Eliz-Mari Marx; Karabo Meso (wk); Seshnie Naidu; Nthabiseng Nini; Luyanda Nzuza; Kayla Reyneke; Nondumiso Shangase; Miané Smit; Faye Tunnicliffe; Caitlin Wyngaard

== T20I series ==
=== 1st T20I ===
11 September 2026
13:30
Scorecard

Zimbabwe; 116 (19.3 overs)	v	South Africa; 117/4 (13.1 overs)
Modester Mupachikwa 36 (43); Nthabiseng Nini 3/17 (3.3 overs)		Anneke Bosch 83 (43); Nyasha Gwanzura 2/19 (4 overs)

South Africa won by 6 wickets
Queens Sports Club, Bulawayo
Umpires: Christopher Phiri (Zim) and Collin Tlou (Zim)
Player of the match: Nthabiseng Nini (SA)

- Zimbabwe won the toss and elected to bat.
- Nthabiseng Nini and Caitlin Wyngaard (SA) both made their T20I debuts.

=== 2nd T20I ===
13 September 2026
13:30
Scorecard

South Africa; 193/3 (20 overs)	v	Zimbabwe; 129/7 (20 overs)
Anneke Bosch 65 (31); Tendai Makusha 1/25 (3 overs)		Christina Mutasa 30* (26); Seshnie Naidu 3/26 (4 overs)

South Africa won by 64 runs
Queens Sports Club, Bulawayo
Umpires: Nkosehle Ndiweni (Zim) and Christopher Phiri (Zim)
Player of the match: Anneke Bosch (SA)

- South Africa won the toss and elected to bat.

=== 3rd T20I ===
15 September 2026
13:30
Scorecard

South Africa; 200/1 (20 overs)	v	Zimbabwe; 120 (19.3 overs)
Laura Wolvaardt 126* (62); Tendai Makusha 1/48 (4 overs)		Michelle Mavunga 41 (23); Annerie Dercksen 5/15 (4 overs)

South Africa won by 80 runs
Queens Sports Club, Bulawayo
Umpires: Nkosehle Ndiweni (Zim) and Christopher Phiri (Zim)
Player of the match: Laura Wolvaardt (SA)

- South Africa won the toss and elected to bat.
- Luyanda Nzuza (SA) made her T20I debut.
- Annerie Dercksen (SA) took her maiden five-wicket haul in T20Is.

=== 4th T20I ===
17 September 2026
13:30
Scorecard

South Africa; 205/4 (20 overs)	v	Zimbabwe; 125/5 (20 overs)
Miané Smit 102 (59); Loryn Phiri 1/29 (3 overs)		Beloved Biza 32 (33); Caitlin Wyngaard 2/15 (3 overs)

South Africa won by 80 runs
Queens Sports Club, Bulawayo
Umpires: Christopher Phiri (Zim) and Collin Tlou (Zim)
Player of the match: Miané Smit (SA)

- South Africa won the toss and elected to bat.
- Jae-Leigh Filander (SA) made her T20I debut.
- Miané Smit (SA) scored her maiden century in T20Is.

=== 5th T20I ===
19 September 2026
13:30
Scorecard

South Africa; 164/6 (20 overs)	v	Zimbabwe; 150/8 (20 overs)
Anneke Bosch 33 (27); Michelle Mavunga 3/46 (4 overs)		Kelis Ndhlovu 38 (30); Nthabiseng Nini 3/19 (4 overs)

South Africa won by 14 runs
Queens Sports Club, Bulawayo
Umpires: Christopher Phiri (Zim) and Collin Tlou (Zim)
Player of the match: Nthabiseng Nini (SA)

- South Africa won the toss and elected to bat.
