= Sri Lanka women's cricket team in South Africa in 2023–24 =

International cricket tour

| | South Africa | Sri Lanka |
- Dates: 27 March – 17 April 2024
| Captains | Laura Wolvaardt (Note: Nadine de Klerk captained South Africa in the second T20I.) | Chamari Athapaththu |

One Day International series
- Results: 3-match series drawn 1–1
| Most runs | Laura Wolvaardt (335) | Chamari Athapaththu (258) |
| Most wickets | Ayabonga Khaka (5) | Kavisha Dilhari (4) |
- Player of the series: Laura Wolvaardt (SA)

Twenty20 International series
- Results: Sri Lanka won the 3-match series 2–1
| Most runs | Laura Wolvaardt (158) | Harshitha Samarawickrama (104) |
| Most wickets | Tumi Sekhukhune (4) | Achini Kulasuriya (4) |
- Player of the series: Laura Wolvaardt (SA)

The Sri Lanka women's cricket team toured South Africa in March and April 2024 to play three One Day International (ODI) and three Twenty20 International (T20I) matches. The T20I series formed part of the teams' preparation for the 2024 ICC Women's T20 World Cup tournament. The ODI series formed part of the 2022–2025 ICC Women's Championship.

South Africa won the first match of the T20I series by 79 runs. Sri Lanka won the second T20I by 7 wickets. Sri Lanka later registered their maiden series victory over South Africa, as they defeated South Africa by 4 wickets in the third and final T20I.

The first ODI was went with no result due to rain. South Africa won the second ODI by 7 wickets and lead the series 1–0. Sri Lanka later registered their highest successful run-chase in women's ODI as they defeated South Africa by 6 wickets in the third and final ODI and level the series 1–1.

== Squads ==
| South Africa | | Sri Lanka |
| ODIs | T20Is | ODIs & T20Is |
|---|---|---|
| Laura Wolvaardt (c); Anneke Bosch; Tazmin Brits; Nadine de Klerk; Sinalo Jafta (wk); Marizanne Kapp; Ayabonga Khaka; Masabata Klaas; Suné Luus; Eliz-Mari Marx; Karabo Meso (wk); Nonkululeko Mlaba; Tumi Sekhukhune; Delmi Tucker | Laura Wolvaardt (c); Anneke Bosch; Tazmin Brits; Nadine de Klerk; Annerie Dercksen; Sinalo Jafta (wk); Marizanne Kapp; Ayabonga Khaka; Masabata Klaas; Suné Luus; Eliz-Mari Marx; Karabo Meso (wk); Nonkululeko Mlaba; Tumi Sekhukhune; Chloe Tryon | Chamari Athapaththu (c); Nilakshi de Silva; Kavisha Dilhari; Imesha Dulani; Vishmi Gunaratne; Hansima Karunaratne; Kawya Kavindi; Achini Kulasuriya; Sugandika Kumari; Hasini Perera; Udeshika Prabodhani; Inoshi Priyadharshani; Oshadi Ranasinghe; Inoka Ranaweera; Harshitha Samarawickrama; Anushka Sanjeewani (wk); Prasadani Weerakkody (wk) |

== T20I series ==
=== 1st T20I ===
27 March 2024
18:00 (N)
Scorecard

| South Africa; 198/5 (20 overs) | v | Sri Lanka; 119 (18.2 overs) |
| Laura Wolvaardt 102 (63); Achini Kulasuriya 2/39 (4 overs) | | Harshitha Samarawickrama 38 (33); Annerie Dercksen 2/15 (3.2 overs) |

South Africa won by 79 runs
Willowmoore Park, Benoni
Umpires: Kerrin Klaaste (SA) and Jacqueline Williams (WI)
Player of the match: Laura Wolvaardt (SA)

- Sri Lanka won the toss and elected to field.
- Suné Luus became the most-capped cricketer for South Africa in women's T20Is, playing in her 115th match.
- Laura Wolvaardt (SA) scored her first century in T20Is.

=== 2nd T20I ===
30 March 2024
14:00
Scorecard

| South Africa; 137/8 (20 overs) | v | Sri Lanka; 138/3 (18.5 overs) |
| Anneke Bosch 50 (32); Achini Kulasuriya 2/26 (4 overs) | | Vishmi Gunaratne 65* (57); Chloe Tryon 1/14 (3 overs) |

Sri Lanka won by 7 wickets
JB Marks Oval, Potchefstroom
Umpires: Lauren Agenbag (SA) and Jacqueline Williams (WI)
Player of the match: Kavisha Dilhari (SL)

- South Africa won the toss and elected to bat.
- Karabo Meso (SA) made her T20I debut.

=== 3rd T20I ===
3 April 2024
18:00 (N)
Scorecard

| South Africa; 155/6 (20 overs) | v | Sri Lanka; 156/6 (19.1 overs) |
| Laura Wolvaardt 56 (47); Sugandika Kumari 3/24 (4 overs) | | Chamari Athapaththu 73 (46); Nadine de Klerk 2/25 (4 overs) |

Sri Lanka won by 4 wickets
Buffalo Park, East London
Umpires: Thomas Mokorosi (SA) and Jacqueline Williams (WI)
Player of the match: Chamari Athapaththu (SL)

- Sri Lanka won the toss and elected to field.

== Tour match ==
6 April 2024
10:00
Scorecard

| South Africa XI | v | Sri Lanka |

Match abandoned
Buffalo Park, East London

- No toss.
- No play was possible due to rain.

== ODI series ==
=== 1st ODI ===
9 April 2024
14:00 (D/N)
Scorecard

| South Africa; 270/6 (50 overs) | v | Sri Lanka; 23/0 (6.5 overs) |
| Tazmin Brits 116 (128); Oshadi Ranasinghe 2/42 (10 overs) | | Chamari Athapaththu 12* (19) |

No result
Buffalo Park, East London
Umpires: Kerrin Klaaste (SA) and Jacqueline Williams (WI)

- Sri Lanka won the toss and elected to field.
- No further play was possible due to rain.
- Women's Championship points: South Africa 1, Sri Lanka 1.

=== 2nd ODI ===
13 April 2024
14:00 (D/N)
Scorecard

| Sri Lanka; 229 (49.5 overs) | v | South Africa; 233/3 (47.4 overs) |
| Chamari Athapaththu 51 (69); Nadine de Klerk 3/23 (6 overs) | | Laura Wolvaardt 110* (141); Achini Kulasuriya 1/35 (8 overs) |

South Africa won by 7 wickets
Diamond Oval, Kimberley
Umpires: Thomas Mokorosi (SA) and Jacqueline Williams (WI)
Player of the match: Laura Wolvaardt (SA)

- South Africa won the toss and elected to field.
- Laura Wolvaardt became the leading run-scorer for South Africa in women's ODIs, passing the previous record of 3,760 runs set by Mignon du Preez.
- Women's Championship points: South Africa 2, Sri Lanka 0.

=== 3rd ODI ===
17 April 2024
14:00 (D/N)
Scorecard

| South Africa; 301/5 (50 overs) | v | Sri Lanka; 305/4 (44.3 overs) |
| Laura Wolvaardt 184* (147); Kavisha Dilhari 2/47 (10 overs) | | Chamari Athapaththu 195* (139); Ayabonga Khaka 2/54 (8 overs) |

Sri Lanka won by 6 wickets
JB Marks Oval, Potchefstroom
Umpires: Lauren Agenbag (SA) and Jacqueline Williams (WI)
Player of the match: Chamari Athapaththu (SL)

- Sri Lanka won the toss and elected to field.
- Ayabonga Khaka (SA) played in her 100th ODI.
- This was the highest successful run chase in women's ODIs.
- Women's Championship points: Sri Lanka 2, South Africa 0.
