= India women's cricket team in South Africa in 2026 =

International cricket tour

	South Africa	India
- Dates: 17 – 27 April 2026
Captains	Laura Wolvaardt	Harmanpreet Kaur

Twenty20 International series
- Results: South Africa won the 5-match series 4–1
Most runs	Laura Wolvaardt (330)	Harmanpreet Kaur (169)
Most wickets	Nonkululeko Mlaba (6); Tumi Sekhukhune (6)	Deepti Sharma (7)
- Player of the series: Laura Wolvaardt (SA)

The India women's cricket team toured South Africa in April 2026 to play the South Africa women's cricket team. The tour consisted of five Twenty20 International (T20I) matches. The matches served as preparation for both teams ahead of the 2026 Women's T20 World Cup. In January 2026, Cricket South Africa (CSA) confirmed the fixtures for the tour, as part of the 2026 home international season.

== Squads ==
South Africa	India
T20Is	T20Is
Laura Wolvaardt (c); Anneke Bosch; Tazmin Brits; Nadine de Klerk; Annerie Dercksen; Ayanda Hlubi; Sinalo Jafta (wk); Ayabonga Khaka; Suné Luus; Tebogo Macheke (wk); Eliz-Mari Marx; Nonkululeko Mlaba; Kayla Reyneke; Tumi Sekhukhune; Chloe Tryon	Harmanpreet Kaur (c); Smriti Mandhana (vc); Shafali Verma; Jemimah Rodrigues; Deepti Sharma; Richa Ghosh (wk); Arundhati Reddy; Renuka Singh Thakur; Kranti Gaud; Shree Charani; Shreyanka Patil; Kashvee Gautam; Bharti Fulmali; Uma Chetry (wk); Anushka Sharma

== T20I series ==
=== 1st T20I ===
17 April 2026
18:00 (N)
Scorecard

India; 157/7 (20 overs)	v	South Africa; 158/4 (19.1 overs)
Harmanpreet Kaur 47* (33); Ayabonga Khaka 3/16 (4 overs)		Laura Wolvaardt 51 (39); Shreyanka Patil 2/26 (4 overs)

South Africa won by 6 wickets
Kingsmead, Durban
Umpires: Lauren Agenbag (SA) and Kerrin Klaaste (SA)
Player of the match: Ayabonga Khaka (SA)

- South Africa won the toss and elected to field.
- Kashvee Gautam (Ind) made her T20I debut.

=== 2nd T20I ===
19 April 2026
14:00
Scorecard

India; 147 (20 overs)	v	South Africa; 148/2 (17.1 overs)
Shafali Verma 57 (38); Chloe Tryon 3/22 (4 overs)		Suné Luus 57 (46); Shreyanka Patil 2/35 (4 overs)

South Africa won by 8 wickets
Kingsmead, Durban
Umpires: Lauren Agenbag (SA) and Stacy Lackay (SA)
Player of the match: Chloe Tryon (SA)

- South Africa won the toss and elected to field.
- Anushka Sharma (Ind) made her T20I debut.

=== 3rd T20I ===
22 April 2026
18:00 (N)
Scorecard

India; 192/4 (20 overs)	v	South Africa; 193/1 (16.3 overs)
Harmanpreet Kaur 66 (38); Nonkululeko Mlaba 2/31 (4 overs)		Laura Wolvaardt 115 (53); Shreyanka Patil 1/30 (3 overs)

South Africa won by 9 wickets
Wanderers Stadium, Johannesburg
Umpires: Lauren Agenbag (SA) and Mazizi Gampu (SA)
Player of the match: Laura Wolvaardt (SA)

- South Africa won the toss and elected to field.

=== 4th T20I ===
25 April 2026
18:00 (N)
Scorecard

India; 185/5 (20 overs)	v	South Africa; 171/9 (20 overs)
Jemimah Rodrigues 43 (29); Kayla Reyneke 2/10 (2 overs)		Suné Luus 40 (24); Deepti Sharma 5/19 (4 overs)

India won by 14 runs
Wanderers Stadium, Johannesburg
Umpires: Mazizi Gampu (SA) and Kerrin Klaaste (SA)
Player of the match: Deepti Sharma (Ind)

- South Africa won the toss and elected to field.
- Deepti Sharma (Ind) took her maiden five-wicket haul in T20Is.

=== 5th T20I ===
27 April 2026
14:00
Scorecard

South Africa; 155/6 (20 overs)	v	India; 132/8 (20 overs)
Laura Wolvaardt 92* (56); Renuka Singh 2/21 (4 overs)		Bharti Fulmali 40 (30); Nonkululeko Mlaba 2/15 (4 overs)

South Africa won by 23 runs
Willowmoore Park, Benoni
Umpires: Lauren Agenbag (SA) and Kerrin Klaaste (SA)
Player of the match: Laura Wolvaardt (SA)

- South Africa won the toss and elected to bat.
