= 2022 Women's Cricket World Cup =

Cricket tournament

2022 ICC Women's Cricket World Cup
- Dates: 4 March – 3 April 2022
- Administrator: International Cricket Council
- Cricket format: Women's One Day International
- Tournament format(s): Round-robin and Knockout
- Host: New Zealand
- Champions: Australia (7th title)
- Runners-up: England
- Participants: 8
- Matches: 31
- Player of the series: (Australia) Alyssa Healy
- Most runs: (Australia) Alyssa Healy (509)
- Most wickets: (England) Sophie Ecclestone (21)
- Official website: Official site

The 2022 ICC Women's Cricket World Cup was the twelfth edition of the Women's Cricket World Cup, which was held in New Zealand in March and April 2022. It was originally scheduled for 6 February to 7 March 2021 but was postponed by one year due to the COVID-19 pandemic. On 15 December 2021, the International Cricket Council (ICC) announced that the tournament would start on 4 March 2022, with the final scheduled for 3 April 2022.

New Zealand qualified automatically as hosts, with all other qualification places determined by the ICC ODI Rankings. Originally, it was announced that three more teams would qualify from the 2017–2020 ICC Women's Championship, but in 2018 this was changed to four teams plus the hosts. It was intended that the remaining three places would be determined through the 2021 Women's Cricket World Cup Qualifier, which was postponed from 2020. However, the tournament was cancelled midway through and the remaining places allocated based on ODI rankings.

Australia were the first team to qualify for the semi-finals after they won their first five matches of the tournament. South Africa became the second team to reach the semi-finals, winning four out of their first six group matches, and gaining a point for a no result against the West Indies. The remaining two semi-final places were decided by the results of the final two matches in the group stage of the tournament. In the first match, England beat Bangladesh by 100 runs to secure their place in the knockout phase. In the last match of the group stage, South Africa beat India by three wickets. The result meant that India were eliminated, with the West Indies taking the final spot in the semi-finals.

Ahead of the first semi-final match, both teams were without key players in their squads. Australia's Ellyse Perry was ruled out of the match after suffering from back spasms, which had also forced her to miss Australia's last group match, against Bangladesh. For the West Indies, their leg spin bowler Afy Fletcher missed the match after testing positive for COVID-19. Australia won the match by 157 runs, with Alyssa Healy and Rachael Haynes scoring 216 runs for the first wicket, including a century from Healy. It was the seventh time that Australia had reached the final of the Women's Cricket World Cup. In the second semi-final, England beat South Africa by 137 runs, reaching their sixth World Cup final. Danni Wyatt scored a century and Sophie Ecclestone took a five-wicket haul to help the defending champions to reach the final.

In the final of the tournament, Australia beat England by 71 runs to win their seventh World Cup. Australia's Alyssa Healy scored 170 runs in the match, the highest individual score made by any cricketer, male or female, in the World Cup Final. England's Nat Sciver also scored a century in the final, finishing with 148 not out. Alyssa Healy was the leading run-scorer in the competition, with 509, and was named the Player of the Tournament. England's Sophie Ecclestone was the leading wicket-taker in the tournament, with 21 dismissals.

== Qualification ==
On 27 November 2021, the ICC announced that the 2021 Women's Cricket World Cup Qualifier had been called off due to concerns of a new COVID variant and travel restrictions. Per the ICC's playing conditions, the three remaining qualification slots were based on the team's rankings, therefore Bangladesh, Pakistan and the West Indies progressed to the 2022 Women's Cricket World Cup.

Team	Mode of qualification
New Zealand	Hosts
Australia	Women's Championship
England	Women's Championship
South Africa	Women's Championship
India	Women's Championship
Bangladesh	ICC ODI Rankings
Pakistan	ICC ODI Rankings
West Indies	ICC ODI Rankings

== Venues ==
On 11 March 2020, the ICC announced the six venues for the 2022 Women's World Cup. Hagley Oval hosted the final. Five other venues, which were used for the league stage and semifinals, were Eden Park, Seddon Park, Bay Oval, University Oval and Basin Reserve.

Christchurch	Auckland	Mount Maunganui
Hagley Oval	Eden Park	Bay Oval
Capacity: 18,000	Capacity: 42,000	Capacity: 10,000
2022 Women's Cricket World Cup is located in New Zealand
Hamilton	Wellington	Dunedin
Seddon Park	Basin Reserve	University Oval
Capacity: 10,000	Capacity: 11,600	Capacity: 3,500

== Squads ==
Each team selected a squad of fifteen players for the World Cup, excluding reserves. On 6 January 2022, India became the first team to announce their squad. On 24 February 2022, the ICC updated its playing conditions for the tournament, allowing matches to go ahead if only nine players, in the event of a COVID-19 outbreak in a squad. Teams could use two female support staff substitutes, in non-batting and non-bowling roles, to play if needed.

== Match officials ==
On 22 February 2022, the ICC appointed the officials for the tournament. Along with the twelve umpires, Gary Baxter, Shandre Fritz and G. S. Lakshmi were also named as the match referees. On 28 March 2022, the ICC confirmed the officials for the semi-final matches. On 1 April 2022, the ICC confirmed the officials for the final, with Lauren Agenbag and Kim Cotton named as the on-field umpires.

- Lauren Agenbag
- Kim Cotton
- Ahmed Shah Pakteen
- Ruchira Palliyaguruge
- Claire Polosak
- Sue Redfern
- Langton Rusere
- Sharfuddoula
- Eloise Sheridan
- Alex Wharf
- Jacqueline Williams
- Paul Wilson

== Matches ==
A total of 31 matches including the semi-finals and a final were played, with all the matches being broadcast live. The opening match was originally planned to be played at the Bay Oval, Mount Maunganui, the two semi-finals at Seddon Park, Hamilton and Bay Oval, Mount Maunganui, with the final match played at Eden Park, Auckland. However, on 15 December 2020, the ICC announced that the two semi-finals would be played at the Hagley Oval and the Basin Reserve.

== Warm-up matches ==
Before the World Cup, the participating nations competed in eight warm-up matches, which were played from 27 February to 2 March 2022. These matches did not have either Women's One Day International (WODI) status or List A status.

Warm-up matches

27 February 2022
10:30
Scorecard

New Zealand; 229 (45 overs)	v	Pakistan; 233/6 (49.2 overs)
Amy Satterthwaite 80 (85); Nashra Sandhu 4/32 (10 overs)		Aliya Riaz 62* (52); Jess Kerr 2/30 (7 overs)

Pakistan Women won by 4 wickets
Bert Sutcliffe Oval, Lincoln
Umpires: Claire Polosak (Aus) and Paul Wilson (Aus)

- Pakistan Women won the toss and elected to field.

27 February 2022
11:00
Scorecard

India; 244/9 (50 overs)	v	South Africa; 242/7 (50 overs)
Harmanpreet Kaur 104 (114); Ayabonga Khaka 3/23 (7 overs)		Suné Luus 86 (98); Rajeshwari Gayakwad 4/46 (10 overs)

India Women won by 2 runs
Rangiora Recreation Ground, Rangiora
Umpires: Sharfuddoula (Ban) and Sue Redfern (Eng)

- South Africa Women won the toss and elected to field.

27 February 2022
11:00
Scorecard

Australia; 259/7 (50 overs)	v	West Indies; 169/9 (50 overs)
Ellyse Perry 62 (77); Stafanie Taylor 3/51 (10 overs)		Stafanie Taylor 66 (86); Ellyse Perry 2/6 (3 overs)

Australia Women won by 90 runs
Lincoln Green, Lincoln
Umpires: Langton Rusere (Zim) and Alex Wharf (Eng)

- West Indies Women won the toss and elected to field.

28 February 2022
11:00
Scorecard

England; 310/9 (50 overs)	v	Bangladesh; 201 (49.4 overs)
Nat Sciver 108 (101); Nahida Akter 3/49 (10 overs)		Sharmin Akhter 81 (137); Nat Sciver 2/12 (4 overs)

England Women won by 109 runs
Lincoln Green, Lincoln
Umpires: Lauren Agenbag (SA) and Eloise Sheridan (Aus)

- Bangladesh Women won the toss and elected to field.

1 March 2022
10:30
Scorecard

Australia; 321 (49.3 overs)	v	New Zealand; 325/1 (43.1 overs)
Meg Lanning 87 (86); Hannah Rowe 4/49 (10 overs)		Sophie Devine 161* (117); Alana King 1/48 (7 overs)

New Zealand Women won by 9 wickets
Bert Sutcliffe Oval, Lincoln
Umpires: Sue Redfern (Eng) and Alex Wharf (Eng)

- New Zealand Women won the toss and elected to field.

1 March 2022
11:00
Scorecard

India; 258 (50 overs)	v	West Indies; 177/9 (50 overs)
Smriti Mandhana 66 (67); Hayley Matthews 2/47 (8 overs)		Shemaine Campbelle 63 (81); Pooja Vastrakar 3/21 (7 overs)

India Women won by 81 runs
Rangiora Recreation Ground, Rangiora
Umpires: Kim Cotton (NZ) and Claire Polosak (Aus)

- India Women won the toss and elected to bat.

2 March 2022
10:30
Scorecard

South Africa; 138/9 (35 overs)	v	England; 139/4 (26.2 overs)
Marizanne Kapp 52 (60); Sophie Ecclestone 3/23 (7 overs)		Tammy Beaumont 35 (45); Ayabonga Khaka 2/8 (4 overs)

England Women won by 6 wickets
Rangiora Recreation Ground, Rangiora
Umpires: Ahmed Shah Pakteen (Afg) and Jacqueline Williams (WI)

- England Women won the toss and elected to field.
- The match was reduced to 35 overs per side due to rain.

2 March 2022
11:00
Scorecard

Pakistan; 199/7 (42 overs)	v	Bangladesh; 194 (41.2 overs)
Aliya Riaz 45* (50); Ritu Moni 3/35 (9 overs)		Fargana Hoque 71 (95); Fatima Sana 4/47 (9 overs)

Pakistan Women won by 7 runs (DLS method)
Lincoln Green, Lincoln
Umpires: Ruchira Palliyaguruge (SL) and Eloise Sheridan (Aus)

- Pakistan Women won the toss and elected to bat.
- Bangladesh Women were set a revised target of 202 runs from 42 overs due to rain.

== Group stage ==
On 11 March 2020, it was announced that in the Group Stage, eight sides will participate in a single-league format with each side playing the other once. This format was last used in the 2017 tournament. The top four sides following the conclusion of the league matches progressed to the semi-finals with the winners meeting in the final. Therefore, a total of 31 matches were played during the tournament. In December 2020 the ICC announced the full match schedule for the tournament, with all the fixtures being confirmed in December 2021.

Pos	Team	Pld	W	L	T	NR	Pts	NRR
1	Australia (C)	7	7	0	0	0	14	1.283
2	South Africa	7	5	1	0	1	11	0.078
3	England (R)	7	4	3	0	0	8	0.949
4	West Indies	7	3	3	0	1	7	−0.885
5	India	7	3	4	0	0	6	0.642
6	New Zealand (H)	7	3	4	0	0	6	0.027
7	Bangladesh	7	1	6	0	0	2	−0.999
8	Pakistan	7	1	6	0	0	2	−1.313

Source: ESPNcricinfo
(C) Champions; (H) Host; (R) Runners-up

Advance to Knockout Stage

=== Round 1 ===
4 March 2022
14:00 (D/N)
Scorecard

West Indies; 259/9 (50 overs)	v	New Zealand; 256 (49.5 overs)
Hayley Matthews 119 (128); Lea Tahuhu 3/57 (9 overs)		Sophie Devine 108 (127); Deandra Dottin 2/2 (0.5 overs)

West Indies Women won by 3 runs
Bay Oval, Mount Maunganui
Umpires: Lauren Agenbag (SA) and Sharfuddoula (Ban)
Player of the match: Hayley Matthews (WI)

- New Zealand Women won the toss and elected to field.
- Sophie Devine (NZ) scored her 3,000th run in WODIs.

5 March 2022
11:00
Scorecard

South Africa; 207 (49.5 overs)	v	Bangladesh; 175 (49.3 overs)
Marizanne Kapp 42 (45); Fariha Trisna 3/35 (10 overs)		Sharmin Akhter 34 (77); Ayabonga Khaka 4/32 (10 overs)

South Africa Women won by 32 runs
University Oval, Dunedin
Umpires: Langton Rusere (Zim) and Eloise Sheridan (Aus)
Player of the match: Ayabonga Khaka (SA)

- Bangladesh Women won the toss and elected to field.
- Ayabonga Khaka (SA) took her 100th wicket in WODIs.

5 March 2022
14:00 (D/N)
Scorecard

Australia; 310/3 (50 overs)	v	England; 298/8 (50 overs)
Rachael Haynes 130 (131); Nat Sciver 2/68 (10 overs)		Nat Sciver 109* (85); Alana King 3/59 (10 overs)

Australia Women won by 12 runs
Seddon Park, Hamilton
Umpires: Ahmed Shah Pakteen (Afg) and Jacqueline Williams (WI)
Player of the match: Rachael Haynes (Aus)

- England Women won the toss and elected to field.
- Tammy Beaumont (Eng) scored her 3,000th run in WODIs.

6 March 2022
14:00 (D/N)
Scorecard

India; 244/7 (50 overs)	v	Pakistan; 137 (43 overs)
Pooja Vastrakar 67 (59); Nashra Sandhu 2/36 (10 overs)		Sidra Ameen 30 (64); Rajeshwari Gayakwad 4/31 (10 overs)

India Women won by 107 runs
Bay Oval, Mount Maunganui
Umpires: Sue Redfern (Eng) and Alex Wharf (Eng)
Player of the match: Pooja Vastrakar (Ind)

- India Women won the toss and elected to bat.

=== Round 2 ===
7 March 2022
11:00
Scorecard

Bangladesh; 140/8 (27 overs)	v	New Zealand; 144/1 (20 overs)
Fargana Hoque 52 (63); Amy Satterthwaite 3/25 (5 overs)		Suzie Bates 79* (68); Salma Khatun 1/34 (4 overs)

New Zealand Women won by 9 wickets
University Oval, Dunedin
Umpires: Claire Polosak (Aus) Paul Wilson (Aus)
Player of the match: Suzie Bates (NZ)

- New Zealand Women won the toss and elected to field.
- The match was reduced to 27 overs per side due to rain.
- Suzie Bates (NZ) scored her 1,000th run in Women's Cricket World Cup matches.

8 March 2022
14:00 (D/N)
Scorecard

Pakistan; 190/6 (50 overs)	v	Australia; 193/3 (34.4 overs)
Bismah Maroof 78* (122); Alana King 2/24 (9 overs)		Alyssa Healy 72 (79); Omaima Sohail 2/39 (8 overs)

Australia Women won by 7 wickets
Bay Oval, Mount Maunganui
Umpires: Kim Cotton (NZ) and Alex Wharf (Eng)
Player of the match: Alyssa Healy (Aus)

- Australia Women won the toss and elected to field.

9 March 2022
11:00
Scorecard

West Indies; 225/6 (50 overs)	v	England; 218 (47.4 overs)
Shemaine Campbelle 66 (80); Sophie Ecclestone 3/20 (10 overs)		Tammy Beaumont 46 (76); Shamilia Connell 3/38 (10 overs)

West Indies Women won by 7 runs
University Oval, Dunedin
Umpires: Claire Polosak (Aus) and Langton Rusere (Zim)
Player of the match: Shemaine Campbelle (WI)

- West Indies Women won the toss and elected to bat.

10 March 2022
14:00 (D/N)
Scorecard

New Zealand; 260/9 (50 overs)	v	India; 198 (46.4 overs)
Amy Satterthwaite 75 (84); Pooja Vastrakar 4/34 (10 overs)		Harmanpreet Kaur 71 (63); Lea Tahuhu 3/17 (10 overs)

New Zealand Women won by 62 runs
Seddon Park, Hamilton
Umpires: Ruchira Palliyaguruge (SL) and Sue Redfern (Eng)
Player of the match: Amy Satterthwaite (NZ)

- India Women won the toss and elected to field.

=== Round 3 ===
11 March 2022
14:00 (D/N)
Scorecard

South Africa; 223/9 (50 overs)	v	Pakistan; 217 (49.5 overs)
Laura Wolvaardt 75 (91); Fatima Sana 3/43 (10 overs)		Omaima Sohail 65 (104); Shabnim Ismail 3/41 (9.5 overs)

South Africa Women won by 6 runs
Bay Oval, Mount Maunganui
Umpires: Sharfuddoula (Ban) and Jacqueline Williams (WI)
Player of the match: Shabnim Ismail (SA)

- Pakistan Women won the toss and elected to field.

12 March 2022
14:00 (D/N)
Scorecard

India; 317/8 (50 overs)	v	West Indies; 162 (40.3 overs)
Smriti Mandhana 123 (119); Anisa Mohammed 2/59 (9 overs)		Deandra Dottin 62 (46); Sneh Rana 3/22 (9.3 overs)

India Women won by 155 runs
Seddon Park, Hamilton
Umpires: Eloise Sheridan (Aus) and Paul Wilson (WI)
Player of the match: Smriti Mandhana (Ind)

- India Women won the toss and elected to bat.

13 March 2022
11:00
Scorecard

Australia; 269/8 (50 overs)	v	New Zealand; 128 (30.2 overs)
Ellyse Perry 68 (86); Lea Tahuhu 3/53 (9 overs)		Amy Satterthwaite 44 (67); Darcie Brown 3/22 (7 overs)

Australia Women won by 141 runs
Basin Reserve, Wellington
Umpires: Lauren Agenbag (SA) and Langton Rusere (Zim)
Player of the match: Ellyse Perry (Aus)

- New Zealand Women won the toss and elected to field.
- Katey Martin (NZ) played in her 100th WODI.
- This was Australia's 100th win against New Zealand in WODIs.

14 March 2022
11:00
Scorecard

Bangladesh; 234/7 (50 overs)	v	Pakistan; 225/9 (50 overs)
Fargana Hoque 71 (115); Nashra Sandhu 3/41 (10 overs)		Sidra Ameen 104 (140); Fahima Khatun 3/38 (8 overs)

Bangladesh Women won by 9 runs
Seddon Park, Hamilton
Umpires: Eloise Sheridan (Aus) and Ahmed Shah Pakteen (Afg)
Player of the match: Fahima Khatun (Ban)

- Pakistan Women won the toss and elected to field.
- Sidra Ameen (Pak) scored her first century in WODIs.
- This was Bangladesh Women's first ever win in a Women's Cricket World Cup match.

=== Round 4 ===
14 March 2022
14:00 (D/N)
Scorecard

England; 235/9 (50 overs)	v	South Africa; 236/7 (49.2 overs)
Tammy Beaumont 62 (97); Marizanne Kapp 5/45 (10 overs)		Laura Wolvaardt 77 (101); Anya Shrubsole 2/34 (9 overs)

South Africa Women won by 3 wickets
Bay Oval, Mount Maunganui
Umpires: Claire Polosak (Aus) and Sharfuddoula (Ban)
Player of the match: Marizanne Kapp (SA)

- South Africa Women won the toss and elected to field.
- Marizanne Kapp (SA) took her first five-wicket haul in WODIs.

15 March 2022
11:00
Scorecard

West Indies; 131 (45.5 overs)	v	Australia; 132/3 (30.2 overs)
Stafanie Taylor 50 (91); Ellyse Perry 3/22 (8 overs)		Rachael Haynes 83* (95); Chinelle Henry 1/20 (5 overs)

Australia Women won by 7 wickets
Basin Reserve, Wellington
Umpires: Sue Redfern (Eng) and Alex Wharf (Eng)
Player of the match: Ellyse Perry (Aus)

- West Indies Women won the toss and elected to bat.

16 March 2022
14:00 (D/N)
Scorecard

India; 134 (36.2 overs)	v	England; 136/6 (31.2 overs)
Smriti Mandhana 35 (58); Charlie Dean 4/23 (8.2 overs)		Heather Knight 53* (72); Meghna Singh 3/26 (7.2 overs)

England Women won by 4 wickets
Bay Oval, Mount Maunganui
Umpires: Kim Cotton (NZ) and Paul Wilson (Aus)
Player of the match: Charlie Dean (Eng)

- England Women won the toss and elected to field.
- Anya Shrubsole (Eng) took her 100th wicket in WODIs.
- Jhulan Goswami (Ind) became the first bowler to take 250 wickets in WODIs.

17 March 2022
14:00 (D/N)
Scorecard

New Zealand; 228 (47.5 overs)	v	South Africa; 229/8 (49.3 overs)
Sophie Devine 93 (101); Shabnim Ismail 3/27 (9 overs)		Laura Wolvaardt 67 (94); Amelia Kerr 3/50 (10 overs)

South Africa Women won by 2 wickets
Seddon Park, Hamilton
Umpires: Ahmed Shah Pakteen (Afg) and Sue Redfern (Eng)
Player of the match: Marizanne Kapp (SA)

- New Zealand Women won the toss and elected to bat.

=== Round 5 ===
18 March 2022
11:00
Scorecard

West Indies; 140/9 (50 overs)	v	Bangladesh; 136 (49.3 overs)
Shemaine Campbelle 53* (107); Salma Khatun 2/23 (10 overs); Nahida Akter 2/23 (10 overs)		Nahida Akter 25* (64); Hayley Matthews 4/15 (10 overs)

West Indies Women won by 4 runs
Bay Oval, Mount Maunganui
Umpires: Eloise Sheridan (Aus) and Paul Wilson (Aus)
Player of the match: Hayley Matthews (WI)

- Bangladesh Women won the toss and elected to field.

19 March 2022
14:00 (D/N)
Scorecard

India; 277/7 (50 overs)	v	Australia; 280/4 (49.3 overs)
Mithali Raj 68 (96); Darcie Brown 3/30 (8 overs)		Meg Lanning 97 (107); Pooja Vastrakar 2/43 (10 overs)

Australia Women won by 6 wickets
Eden Park, Auckland
Umpires: Lauren Agenbag (SA) and Sharfuddoula (Ban)
Player of the match: Meg Lanning (Aus)

- Australia Women won the toss and elected to field.
- Jhulan Goswami (Ind) played in her 200th WODI.
- Australia Women qualified for the semi-finals as a result of this match.
- This was the highest-ever successful run chase in the Women's Cricket World Cup.

20 March 2022
11:00
Scorecard

New Zealand; 203 (48.5 overs)	v	England; 204/9 (47.2 overs)
Maddy Green 52* (75); Kate Cross 3/35 (10 overs)		Nat Sciver 61 (108); Frances Mackay 4/34 (9 overs)

England Women won by 1 wicket
Eden Park, Auckland
Umpires: Ruchira Palliyaguruge (SL) and Jacqueline Williams (WI)
Player of the match: Nat Sciver (Eng)

- England Women won the toss and elected to field.

21 March 2022
14:00 (D/N)
Scorecard

West Indies; 89/7 (20 overs)	v	Pakistan; 90/2 (18.5 overs)
Deandra Dottin 27 (35); Nida Dar 4/10 (4 overs)		Muneeba Ali 37 (43); Shakera Selman 1/15 (3.5 overs)

Pakistan Women won by 8 wickets
Seddon Park, Hamilton
Umpires: Eloise Sheridan (Aus) and Paul Wilson (Aus)
Player of the match: Nida Dar (Pak)

- Pakistan Women won the toss and elected to field.
- The match was reduced to 20 overs per side due to rain.

=== Round 6 ===
22 March 2022
11:00
Scorecard

South Africa; 271/5 (50 overs)	v	Australia; 272/5 (45.2 overs)
Laura Wolvaardt 90 (134); Annabel Sutherland 1/26 (6 overs)		Meg Lanning 135* (130); Shabnim Ismail 2/33 (7 overs)

Australia Women won by 5 wickets
Basin Reserve, Wellington
Umpires: Kim Cotton (NZ) and Alex Wharf (Eng)
Player of the match: Meg Lanning (Aus)

- Australia Women won the toss and elected to field.
- This was Australia Women's 18th successful run chase in a row, the most by any team in men's or women's cricket in ODIs.

22 March 2022
14:00 (D/N)
Scorecard

India; 229/7 (50 overs)	v	Bangladesh; 119 (40.3 overs)
Yastika Bhatia 50 (80); Ritu Moni 3/37 (10 overs)		Salma Khatun 32 (35); Sneh Rana 4/30 (10 overs)

India Women won by 110 runs
Seddon Park, Hamilton
Umpires: Claire Polosak (Aus) and Langton Rusere (Zim)
Player of the match: Yastika Bhatia (Ind)

- India Women won the toss and elected to bat.

24 March 2022
11:00
Scorecard

South Africa; 61/4 (10.5 overs)	v	West Indies
Mignon du Preez 38* (31); Chinelle Henry 3/19 (5 overs)

No result
Basin Reserve, Wellington
Umpires: Ahmed Shah Pakteen (Afg) and Sue Redfern (Eng)

- West Indies Women won the toss and elected to field.
- The match was reduced to 26 overs per side due to rain.
- No further play was possible due to rain.
- South Africa Women qualified for the semi-finals as a result of this match.

24 March 2022
14:00 (D/N)
Scorecard

Pakistan; 105 (41.3 overs)	v	England; 107/1 (19.2 overs)
Sidra Nawaz 23 (44); Katherine Brunt 3/17 (8 overs)		Danni Wyatt 76* (68); Diana Baig 1/14 (6 overs)

England Women won by 9 wickets
Hagley Oval, Christchurch
Umpires: Ruchira Palliyaguruge (SL) and Jacqueline Williams (WI)
Player of the match: Danni Wyatt (Eng)

- England Women won the toss and elected to field.
- Pakistan Women were eliminated as a result of this match.

=== Round 7 ===
25 March 2022
11:00
Scorecard

Bangladesh; 135/6 (43 overs)	v	Australia; 136/5 (32.1 overs)
Lata Mondal 33 (63); Jess Jonassen 2/13 (9 overs)		Beth Mooney 66* (75); Salma Khatun 3/23 (9 overs)

Australia Women won by 5 wickets
Basin Reserve, Wellington
Umpires: Lauren Agenbag (SA) and Alex Wharf (Eng)
Player of the match: Beth Mooney (Aus)

- Australia Women won the toss and elected to field.
- The match was reduced to 43 overs per side due to rain.
- Fargana Hoque became the first batter for Bangladesh Women to score 1,000 runs in WODIs.
- Bangladesh Women were eliminated as a result of this match.

26 March 2022
11:00
Scorecard

New Zealand; 265/8 (50 overs)	v	Pakistan; 194/9 (50 overs)
Suzie Bates 126 (135); Nida Dar 3/39 (10 overs)		Nida Dar 50 (53); Hannah Rowe 5/55 (10 overs)

New Zealand Women won by 71 runs
Hagley Oval, Christchurch
Umpires: Claire Polosak (Aus) and Langton Rusere (Zim)
Player of the match: Suzie Bates (NZ)

- Pakistan Women won the toss and elected to field.
- Suzie Bates became the first batter for New Zealand Women to score 5,000 runs in WODIs.
- Hannah Rowe (NZ) took her first five-wicket haul in WODIs.

27 March 2022
11:00
Scorecard

England; 234/6 (50 overs)	v	Bangladesh; 134 (48 overs)
Sophia Dunkley 67 (72); Salma Khatun 2/46 (10 overs)		Lata Mondal 30 (45); Sophie Ecclestone 3/15 (10 overs)

England Women won by 100 runs
Basin Reserve, Wellington
Umpires: Kim Cotton (NZ) and Ruchira Palliyaguruge (SL)
Player of the match: Sophia Dunkley (Eng)

- England Women won the toss and elected to bat.
- England Women qualified for the semi-finals as a result of this match, while New Zealand Women were eliminated.

27 March 2022
14:00 (D/N)
Scorecard

India; 274/7 (50 overs)	v	South Africa; 275/7 (50 overs)
Smriti Mandhana 71 (84); Masabata Klaas 2/38 (8 overs)		Laura Wolvaardt 80 (79); Harmanpreet Kaur 2/42 (8 overs)

South Africa Women won by 3 wickets
Hagley Oval, Christchurch
Umpires: Sharfuddoula (Ban) and Jacqueline Williams (WI)
Player of the match: Mignon du Preez (SA)

- India Women won the toss and elected to bat.
- This was the highest successful run chase for South Africa Women in WODIs.
- West Indies Women qualified for the semi-finals as a result of this match, while India Women were eliminated.

== Knockout stage ==
Semi-finals
30 March – Basin Reserve, Wellington
Australia	305/5
West Indies	148
31 March – Hagley Oval, Christchurch
England	293/8
South Africa	156

Final
3 April – Hagley Oval, Christchurch
Australia	356/5
England	285

=== Semi-finals ===
Semi Final 1
30 March 2022
11:00
Scorecard

Australia; 305/3 (45 overs)	v	West Indies; 148 (37 overs)
Alyssa Healy 129 (107); Chinelle Henry 2/51 (9 overs)		Stafanie Taylor 48 (75); Jess Jonassen 2/14 (5 overs)

Australia Women won by 157 runs
Basin Reserve, Wellington
Umpires: Lauren Agenbag (SA) and Kim Cotton (NZ)
Player of the match: Alyssa Healy (Aus)

- West Indies Women won the toss and elected to field.
- The match was reduced to 45 overs per side due to rain.

Semi Final 2
31 March 2022
14:00 (D/N)
Scorecard

England; 293/8 (50 overs)	v	South Africa; 156 (38 overs)
Danni Wyatt 129 (125); Shabnim Ismail 3/46 (10 overs)		Mignon du Preez 30 (48); Sophie Ecclestone 6/36 (8 overs)

England Women won by 137 runs
Hagley Oval, Christchurch
Umpires: Claire Polosak (Aus) and Eloise Sheridan (Aus)
Player of the match: Danni Wyatt (Eng)

- South Africa Women won the toss and elected to field.
- Lizelle Lee and Suné Luus (SA) both played in their 100th WODI.
- Sophie Ecclestone (Eng) took her first five-wicket haul in WODIs.

=== Final ===
Final
3 April 2022
13:00 (D/N)
Scorecard

Australia; 356/5 (50 overs)	v	England; 285 (43.4 overs)
Alyssa Healy 170 (138); Anya Shrubsole 3/46 (10 overs)		Nat Sciver 148* (121); Jess Jonassen 3/57 (8.4 overs)

Australia Women won by 71 runs
Hagley Oval, Christchurch
Umpires: Lauren Agenbag (SA) and Kim Cotton (NZ)
Player of the match: Alyssa Healy (Aus)

- England Women won the toss and elected to field.
- Meg Lanning (Aus) played in her 100th WODI.

== Statistics ==
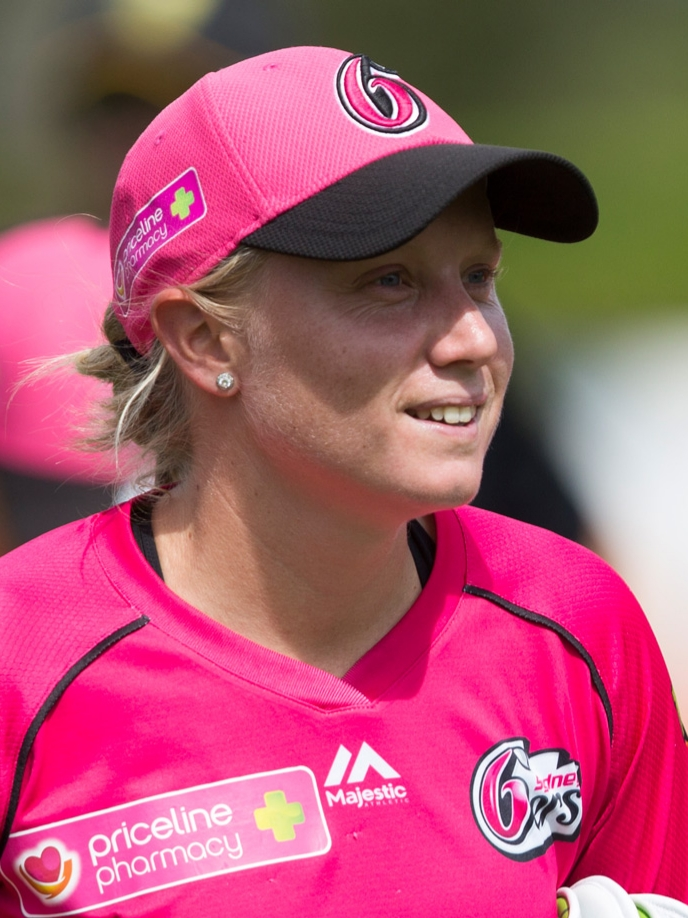
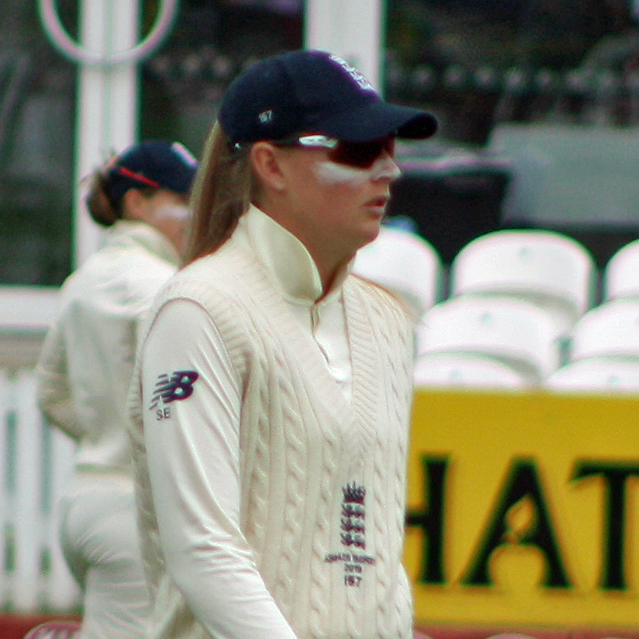
Alyssa Healy (left) was the tournament's leading run-scorer, and Sophie Ecclestone (right) was the leading wicket-taker.

=== Most runs ===
Player	Innings	Runs	Average	HS	100	50
(Australia) Alyssa Healy	9	509	56.55	170	2	4
(Australia) Rachael Haynes	9	497	62.12	130	1	4
(England) Nat Sciver	8	436	72.66	148*	2	3
(South Africa) Laura Wolvaardt	8	433	54.12	90	0	5
(Australia) Meg Lanning	9	394	56.28	135*	1	3
Source: ESPN Cricinfo

=== Most wickets ===
Player	Innings	Wickets	BBI	Avg	Econ	SR	5W
(England) Sophie Ecclestone	9	21	6/36	15.61	3.83	24.4	1
(South Africa) Shabnim Ismail	7	14	3/27	17.50	4.02	26.0	0
(Australia) Jess Jonassen	8	13	3/57	18.84	4.04	27.9	0
(Australia) Alana King	8	12	3/59	24.50	4.52	32.5	0
(South Africa) Marizanne Kapp	7	12	5/45	26.25	4.73	33.2	1
Source: ESPN Cricinfo

=== Highest team totals ===
Score	Team	Against	Venue	Result	Date
356-5	Australia	England	Christchurch	Won	03-04-2022
317-8	India	West Indies	Hamilton	Won	12-03-2022
310-3	Australia	England	Hamilton	Won	05-03-2022
305-3	Australia	West Indies	Wellington	Won	30-3-2022
298-8	England	Australia	Hamilton	Lost	05-03-2022

=== Highest Individual Score ===
Runs	Balls	Batsman	Opponent	Venue	Date	Strike rate
170	138	(Australia) Alyssa Healy	England	Christchurch	03-04-2022	123.18
148*	121	(England) Nat Sciver-Brunt	Australia	Christchurch	03-04-2022	122.31
135*	130	(Australia) Meg Lanning	South Africa	Wellington	22-03-2022	103.84
130	121	(Australia) Rachel Haynes	England	Hamilton	05-03-2022	99.23
129	107	(Australia) Alyssa Healy	West Indies	Wellington	30-03-2022	120.56

=== Most catches ===
Catches	Matches	Player
7	9	(Australia) Beth Mooney
6	8	(Cricket West Indies) Deandra Dottin
6	8	(Australia) Jess Jonassen
6	8	(Cricket West Indies) Hayley Matthews
6	9	(Australia) Meg Lanning

=== Team of the Tournament ===
On 4 April, the ICC announced the team of the tournament.

- (South Africa) Laura Wolvaardt
- (Australia) Alyssa Healy (wk)
- (Australia) Meg Lanning (c)
- (Australia) Rachael Haynes
- (England) Nat Sciver
- (Australia) Beth Mooney
- (Cricket West Indies) Hayley Matthews
- (South Africa) Marizanne Kapp
- (England) Sophie Ecclestone
- (South Africa) Shabnim Ismail
- (Bangladesh) Salma Khatun
- (England) Charlie Dean (12th)
