= Laura Wolvaardt =

South African cricketer (born 1999)

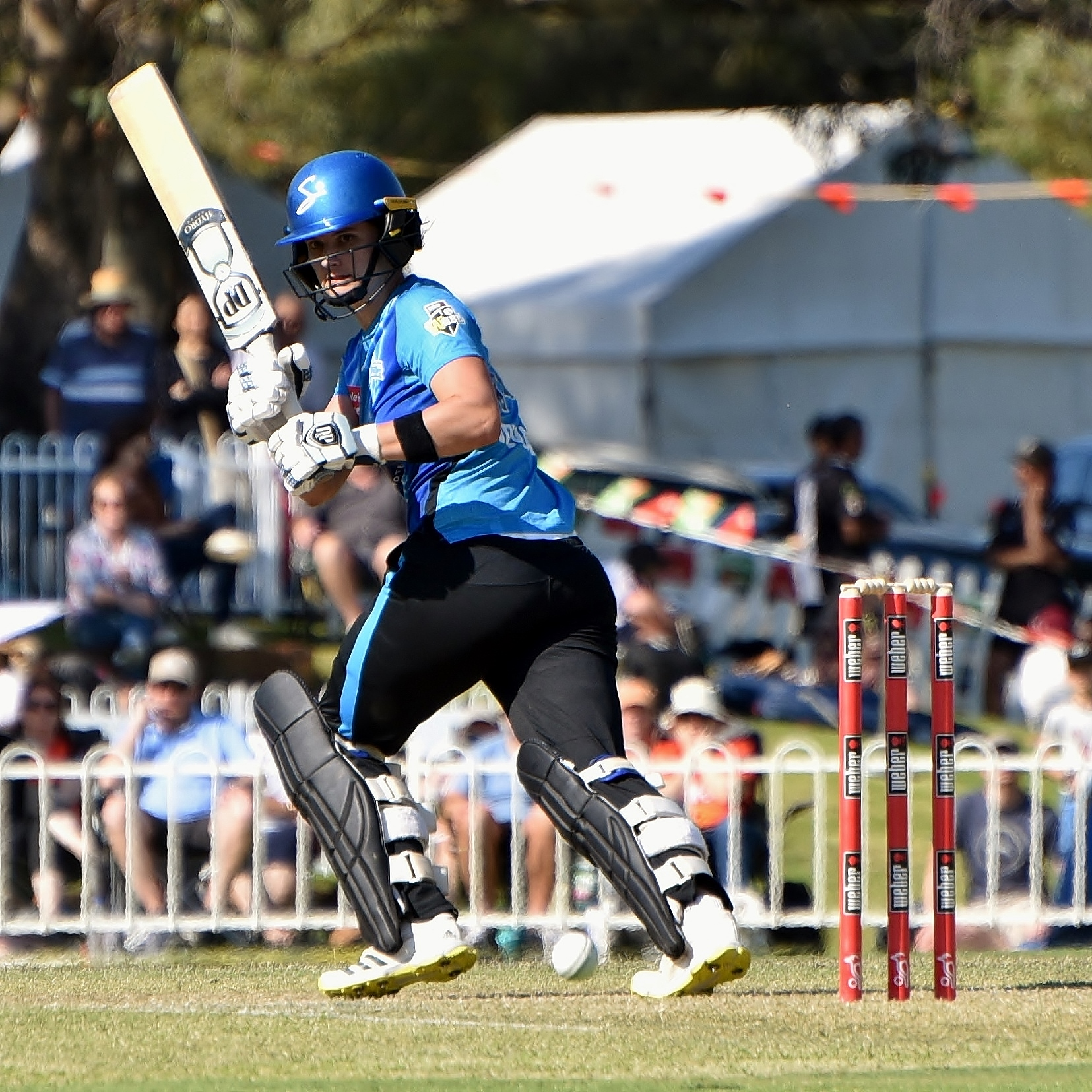

Personal information
- Born: 26 April 1999 (age 27); Milnerton, Western Cape, South Africa
- Height: 176 cm (5 ft 9 in)
- Batting: Right-handed
- Role: Batter

International information
- National side: South Africa (2016–present)
- Test debut (cap 66): 27 June 2022 v England
- Last Test: 15 December 2024 v England
- ODI debut (cap 74): 7 February 2016 v England
- Last ODI: 4 April 2026 v New Zealand
- ODI shirt no.: 14
- T20I debut (cap 43): 1 August 2016 v Ireland
- Last T20I: 2 July 2026 v England
- T20I shirt no.: 14

Domestic team information
- Years: Team
- 2013/14–2022/23: Western Province
- 2017/18–2018/19: Brisbane Heat
- 2020/21–present: Adelaide Strikers
- 2021–2022: Northern Superchargers
- 2022: Velocity
- 2023–2025: Gujarat Giants
- 2023–2024: Manchester Originals
- 2023/24–present: Northerns
- 2025: Southern Brave
- 2026 - present: Delhi Capitals (WPL)

Career statistics
Competition	WTest	WODI	WT20I
Matches	4	128	98
Runs scored	255	5695	2764
Batting average	31.87	51.30	38.92
100s/50s	1/1	13/40	3/16
Top score	122	184*	115*
Catches/stumpings	1/–	51/–	26/–
Medal record
Women's cricket
Representing South Africa
ICC Cricket World Cup
Runner-up	2025 India
ICC T20 World Cup
Runner-up	2023 South Africa
Runner-up	2024 UAE
- Source: ESPNcricinfo, 27 April 2026

Laura Wolvaardt (born 26 April 1999) is a South African cricketer who has played for the South Africa national team since 2016. A right-handed opening batter, she has scored 5,695 career runs in women's One Day Internationals (WODIs), the fifth most in history, with an average of 51.30. Wolvaardt has served as the captain of South Africa since 2024, finishing runners-up in the 2024 WT20 and the 2025 WODI world cups.

She plays for Western Province, Adelaide Strikers and Southern Brave. She has previously played for Northern Superchargers, Brisbane Heat and Gujarat Giants.

== Personal life ==
Wolvaardt graduated from Parklands College in 2017 with 7 distinctions, ranking top in her class. Simultaneously she served as head prefect alongside the other head prefect, Connor Fick.

== Career ==
=== Domestic ===
Aged 11, Wolvaardt was selected to play for the Western Province U-19 girls' team. In October 2013, she made her first appearance for the Western Province women's cricket team in a Twenty20 match against Boland women's cricket team, scoring 13 runs from 18 balls. She made her limited overs cricket debut for Western Province in a November 2013 match against Boland, scoring 4 from 14 balls. She was the top scorer in the 2013 Cricket South Africa Under 19 Girls Week, and competed again in 2014 representing Western Province. Wolvaardt scored 46 in Western Province's final match of the 2015/16 Women's Provincial League, as they won the title for the fourth consecutive year.

In November 2017, she was named in Brisbane Heat's squad for the 2017–18 Women's Big Bash League season. In November 2018, she was named in Brisbane Heat's squad for the 2018–19 Women's Big Bash League season. She played for the Heat in their final against Sydney Sixers. Heat won the match to win the title.

Laura continued her appearances in the WBBL after signing with the Adelaide Strikers for the 2020–21 and 2021–22 Australian summer seasons.

In September 2019, she was named in the Terblanche XI squad for the inaugural edition of the Women's T20 Super League in South Africa. In 2021, she was drafted by Northern Superchargers for the inaugural season of The Hundred. In April 2022, she was bought by the Northern Superchargers for the 2022 season of The Hundred.

In 2023, she was bought by Manchester Originals in for the 2023 season of The Hundred.

In 2025, she became the second player to become a direct signing for the Southern Brave In the 2025 The Hundred season.

In March 2023, Wolvaardt was added to the Gujarat Giants squad as a mid-season replacement for Beth Mooney in the 2023 Women's Premier League.

=== International ===
In December 2013, 13-year-old Wolvaardt was invited to play for a South Africa Women's U-19 invitational team. She was later named the 2013 Cricket South Africa under-19 female cricketer of the year. Wolvaardt has captained the South Africa Women's U-19 team, and in February 2016, she made her Women's One Day International debut in the opening match of a three-match series against England aged 16. In the second match of the series, she scored her maiden half century in a 114-run partnership with Trisha Chetty. She also played in a match against West Indies, and scored 10 in an opening partnership of 33 runs.

In August 2016, Wolvaardt became the youngest centurion, male or female, for South Africa in international cricket. As a 17-year-old, the opener struck a match-winning 105 against Ireland Women to wrap up a 67-run victory in Malahide, Ireland.

In May 2017, she was named Women's Newcomer of the Year at Cricket South Africa's annual awards. In March 2018, she was one of fourteen players to be awarded a national contract by Cricket South Africa ahead of the 2018–19 season. In October 2018, she was named in South Africa's squad for the 2018 ICC Women's World Twenty20 tournament in the West Indies. Ahead of the tournament, she was named as the player to watch in the team. In January 2020, she was named in South Africa's squad for the 2020 Women's T20 World Cup in Australia. On 23 July 2020, Wolvaardt was named in South Africa's 24-woman squad to begin training in Pretoria, ahead of their planned tour to England.

In February 2022, she was named in South Africa's team for the 2022 Women's Cricket World Cup in New Zealand.

In May 2022, she played seven matches for the Barmy Army team at the 2022 FairBreak Invitational T20 in Dubai, United Arab Emirates. During the Invitational, she scored a total of 186 runs at a strike rate of 116.25, including two fifties.

In June 2022, Wolvaardt was named in South Africa's Women's Test squad for their one-off match against England Women. She made her Test debut on 27 June 2022, for South Africa against England. In July 2022, she was named in South Africa's team for the cricket tournament at the 2022 Commonwealth Games in Birmingham, England.

On 27 March 2024, she scored her maiden century in T20I cricket, against Sri Lanka.

On 13 April 2024, she became the highest run getter for South Africa in Women's ODIs going past Mignon du Preez(3760).

On 17 April 2024, she scored her ODI career best 184 off 147 against Sri Lanka at Potchefstroom that ended up as the highest individual score in losing cause in women's ODIs.

On 1 July 2024, Wolvaardt scored her maiden Test century, against India, becoming only the third woman to score a century in all three international formats, behind Heather Knight and Tammy Beaumont.

She was named captain of the South Africa squad for the 2024 Women's T20 World Cup and their multi-format home series against England in November 2024.

Wolvaardt was among the four player shortlists for the Women’s Cricketer of the Year, Women’s ODI Cricketer of the Year and Women's T20I Cricketer of the Year in the 2024 ICC Awards.

On 29 October 2025, Wolvaardt scored 169 off 143 against England at Barsapara, Guwahati, her first ever hundred in ODI World Cups. Her knock helped South Africa best England by 125 runs and get to their first ever ODI World Cup final(Men or Women).

On 22 April 2026, she scored a 47-ball century at Wanderers, Johannesburg against India in T20I. Her century was the fastest T20I century for South Africa Women and helped her level Smriti Mandhana and Meg Lanning with 17 international centuries.

== International centuries ==
After scoring her maiden Test century, against India in 2024, Wolvaardt became only the third woman to score a century in all three international formats, behind Heather Knight and Tammy Beaumont.

Centuries against nations
Opponent	Test	ODI	T20I	Total
Australia	–	–	–	–
Bangladesh	–	1	–	1
England	–	1	–	1
India	1	2	1	4
Ireland	–	4	1	5
New Zealand	–	1	–	1
Pakistan	–	1	–	1
Scotland	–	–	–	–
Sri Lanka	–	2	1	3
Thailand	–	–	–	–
West Indies	–	1	–	1
Zimbabwe	–	–	1	1
Total	1	13	4	18

== Key ==
- * – Remained not out
- † – Player of the match
- ‡ – Captain of South Africa in that match

=== Test centuries ===
Test centuries
No.	Runs	Match	Opponent	Pos.	Inn.	Test	Venue	H/A/N	Result	Year	Ref
1	122 ‡	3	India	1	3	1/1	M. A. Chidambaram Stadium, Chennai	Away	Lost	2024	

- Source: CricInfo

=== ODI centuries ===
One Day International centuries
No.	Runs	Match	Opponent	Pos.	Inn.	S/R	Venue	H/A/N	Result	Year	Ref
1	105	7	Ireland	1	1	84.00	The Village, Dublin	Away	Won	2016	
2	149 †	18	Ireland	2	1	100.00	Senwes Park, Potchefstroom	Home	Won	2017	
3	117 †	65	West Indies	1	1	95.12	Wanderers Stadium, Johannesburg	Home	Won	2022	
4	124* † ‡	85	New Zealand	1	2	87.94	City Oval, Pietermaritzburg	Home	Won	2023	
5	126 ‡	89	Bangladesh	1	1	94.02	Willowmoore Park, Benoni	Home	Won	2023	
6	110* † ‡	94	Sri Lanka	1	2	78.01	Diamond Oval, Kimberley	Home	Won	2024	
7	184* ‡	95	Sri Lanka	1	1	125.17	JB Marks Oval, Potchefstroom	Home	Lost	2024	
8	135* ‡	97	India	1	2	100.00	M. Chinnaswamy Stadium, Bengaluru	Away	Lost	2024	
9	100 ‡	109	Pakistan	2	1	77.51	Gaddafi Stadium, Lahore	Away	Won	2024	
10	169 † ‡	118	England	1	1	118.18	Assam Cricket Association Stadium, Guwahati, Guwahati	Neutral	Won	2025	
11	101 ‡	119	India	1	2	103.06	DY Patil Stadium, Navi Mumbai	Away	Lost	2025	
12	124 † ‡	121	Ireland	1	1	111.71	St George's Park Cricket Ground, Gqeberha	Home	Won	2025	
13	100* † ‡	122	Ireland	1	2	107.52	Wanderers Stadium, Johannesburg	Home	Won	2025	

- Source: CricInfo

=== T20I centuries ===
Twenty20 International centuries
No.	Runs	Match	Opponent	Pos.	Inn.	S/R	Venue	H/A/N	Result	Year	Ref
1	102 † ‡	63	Sri Lanka	1	1	161.90	Willowmoore Park, Benoni	Home	Won	2024	
2	115* † ‡	82	Ireland	3	1	205.35	Newlands Cricket Ground, Cape Town	Home	Won	2025	
3	115 † ‡	96	India	1	2	216.98	Wanderers Stadium, Johannesburg	Home	Won	2026	
4	126* † ‡	107	Zimbabwe	1	1	203.22	Queens Sports Club, Bulawayo	Away	Won	2026	

- Source: CricInfo

== Honours ==
In July 2020, Wolvaardt was named South Africa's Women's Cricketer of the Year at Cricket South Africa's annual awards ceremony. At the 2021 ICC Awards, she was named in the ICC Women's T20I Team of the Year.. In 2026, Wolvaardt was featured in the Red Bull Documentary What We Know revolving around South African Sportspeople alongside fellow cricketers Kagiso Rabada and Temba Bavuma.

== See also ==
- List of centuries in women's One Day International cricket
