= 2025 Women's Cricket World Cup =

13th edition of Women's Cricket World Cup

2025 ICC Women's Cricket World Cup
- Dates: 30 September – 2 November 2025
- Administrator: International Cricket Council
- Cricket format: Women's One Day International
- Tournament format(s): Round-robin and Knockout stage
- Host(s): India; Sri Lanka (Note: The official sole host for the tournament was India. Due to Pakistan's refusal to visit India, their matches were relocated to Sri Lanka, along with a few Sri Lankan fixtures.)
- Champions: India (1st title)
- Runners-up: South Africa
- Participants: 8
- Matches: 31
- Player of the series: (India) Deepti Sharma
- Most runs: (South Africa) Laura Wolvaardt (571)
- Most wickets: (India) Deepti Sharma (22)

The 2025 ICC Women's Cricket World Cup was the 13th edition of the Women's Cricket World Cup. India hosted the World Cup for the fourth time, after the 1978, 1997 and 2013 editions, with the tournament held from 30 September to 2 November 2025. This was the last time the tournament had eight teams. India became champions after defeating South Africa in the final, securing their maiden World Cup title. Australia were the defending champions, but were knocked out in the semi-final by eventual champions India.

== Background ==
=== Neutral venue arrangements ===
On 19 December 2024, following an agreement between the BCCI and PCB, the ICC confirmed that matches between India and Pakistan at ICC events in 2024–2027 will be played at neutral venues. Similarly, in accordance with this agreement all of Pakistan's matches along with a few other matches were shifted to Sri Lanka.

=== Marketing ===
Before the commencement of the tournament, the ICC hosted a Trophy Tour, during which the trophy was taken to various locations across the four Indian host cities and in later to Colombo. The tour began on 11 August in Mumbai. ICC Chairman Jay Shah, along with former cricketers Mithali Raj and Yuvraj Singh, and Indian cricketers Harmanpreet Kaur, Smriti Mandhana, and Jemimah Rodrigues, launched the Trophy Tour at a 50-day countdown event held in Mumbai.

=== Opening ceremony ===
The opening ceremony was held in Assam Cricket Association Stadium, Guwahati ahead of the tournament opener between India and Sri Lanka on 30 September.

Indian singer Shreya Ghoshal performed the official World Cup anthem, "Bring it Home".

== Qualification ==
Highlighted are the countries that participated in the 2025 Women's Cricket World Cup. Qualified as host Qualified via the 2020–2023 Women's Championship Qualified via the 2025 Qualifier Participated in the qualifier but failed to qualify

List of teams qualified for the 2025 Women's Cricket World Cup
Means of qualification	Date	Venue	Berths	Qualified
Host nation	26 July 2022	—N/a	1	India
2022–2025 Women's Championship (Top 5 teams, excluding the host)	1 June 2022 – 24 January 2025	Home or away	5	Australia
2022–2025 Women's Championship (Top 5 teams, excluding the host)	1 June 2022 – 24 January 2025	Home or away	5	England
2022–2025 Women's Championship (Top 5 teams, excluding the host)	1 June 2022 – 24 January 2025	Home or away	5	New Zealand
2022–2025 Women's Championship (Top 5 teams, excluding the host)	1 June 2022 – 24 January 2025	Home or away	5	South Africa
2022–2025 Women's Championship (Top 5 teams, excluding the host)	1 June 2022 – 24 January 2025	Home or away	5	Sri Lanka
2025 Cricket World Cup Qualifier	9 – 19 April 2025	Pakistan	2	Bangladesh
2025 Cricket World Cup Qualifier	9 – 19 April 2025	Pakistan	2	Pakistan
		Total	8	

The West Indies, semi-finalists at the preceding 2022 tournament, failed to qualify for the World Cup for the first time since 2000 and the first time in the World Cup's history as an ICC-run tournament.

== Venues ==
It was originally planned that matches would be played at five different Indian venues, with the BCCI prioritising cities likely to enjoy favourable weather conditions and which were efficient in terms of transport and logistics.

After Pakistan's qualification, it was agreed that their matches would be played outside India at a neutral venue. In June 2025, the ICC announced the final venues in India and Sri Lanka. The cities of Guwahati, Indore, Visakhapatnam, and Colombo (Sri Lanka) were initially announced as venues. The following month, the ICC replaced Bengaluru with the DY Patil Stadium in Navi Mumbai.

One semi-final was played in Guwahati, while the other semi-final and the final were played in Navi Mumbai.

Country	India				Sri Lanka
City	Navi Mumbai	Guwahati	Visakhapatnam	Indore	Colombo
Stadium	DY Patil Stadium	Assam Cricket Association Stadium	ACA–VDCA Cricket Stadium	Holkar Stadium	R. Premadasa Stadium
Capacity	45,300	46,000	27,500	30,000	35,000
Matches	5	5	5	5	11
2025 Women's Cricket World Cup is located in India

== Match officials ==
On 11 September 2025, the ICC appointed the officials for the tournament. This was the first time that whole panel was led by female officials.

=== Match referees ===
- (New Zealand) Trudy Anderson
- (South Africa) Shandre Fritz
- (India) G. S. Lakshmi
- (Sri Lanka) Michell Pereira

=== Umpires ===
- (Australia) Claire Polosak
- (Australia) Eloise Sheridan
- (Bangladesh) Shathira Jakir
- (England) Sue Redfern
- (India) Gayathri Venugopalan
- (India) Narayanan Janani
- (India) Vrinda Rathi
- (New Zealand) Kim Cotton
- (South Africa) Kerrin Klaaste
- (South Africa) Lauren Agenbag
- (Sri Lanka) Nimali Perera
- (Cricket West Indies) Candace la Borde
- (Cricket West Indies) Jacqueline Williams
- (Zimbabwe) Sarah Dambanevana

== Squads ==
Each team had to select a squad of 15 players. On 19 August, Host India became the first team to announce their squad. England announced their squad on 21 August. Bangladesh announced their squad on 23 August. Pakistan announced their squad on 25 August. South Africa announced their squad on 3 September. Australia announced their squad on 5 September. New Zealand announced their squad on 10 September. Sri Lanka were the final team to announce their squad, doing so on 10 September.

== Prize money ==
Prize money – 2025 ICC Women's Cricket World Cup
Stage	Teams	Prize money (USD)	Total (USD)
Winner	1	6,580,000	6,580,000
Runner-up	1	3,240,000	3,240,000
Semi-finalists	2	1,120,000	2,240,000
5th & 6th place	2	700,000	1,400,000
7th & 8th place	2	280,000	560,000
Group stage wins	24 (est.)	34,314	823,536
Participation fee	8	250,000	2,000,000
Total			13,880,000

The International Cricket Council (ICC) announced a prize fee of a total of $13.88 million. This marks a 297% increase in the total prize pool compared to the US$3.5 million announced for the 2022 edition in New Zealand, and even surpasses the total prize money of the 2023 Men's Cricket World Cup. The winner's purse of US$6.58 million also exceeds the US$4 million awarded in the men's 2023 edition, highlighting a landmark commitment to gender equity in cricket.

== Warm-up matches ==
Before the competition, teams were played in a series of warm-up matches between 25 and 28 September. These matches did not have either ODI or List A status.

Warm-up matches

25 September 2025
09:30
Scorecard

New Zealand; 273/9 (50 overs)	v	India A 226/6 (39.3 overs)
Izzy Gaze 101* (100); Sayali Satghare 3/45 (9 overs)		Shafali Verma 70 (49); Jess Kerr 2/15 (4 overs)

India A won by 4 wickets (DLS method)
BCCI Centre of Excellence Ground B, Bengaluru
Umpires: Shathira Jakir (Ban) and Sue Redfern (Eng)

- New Zealand won the toss and elected to bat.
- India A's innings was interrupted at 38.5 overs due to rain and was reduced to 40 overs.
- India A were set a revised target of 224 runs from 40 overs.

25 September 2025
15:00 (D/N)
Scorecard

South Africa; 45/3 (9 overs)	v	Bangladesh
Marizanne Kapp 21 (22); Marufa Akter 2/8 (4 overs)

No result
R. Premadasa Stadium, Colombo
Umpires: Kim Cotton (NZ) and Nimali Perera (SL)

- South Africa won the toss and elected to bat.
- No further play was possible due to rain.

25 September 2025
15:00 (D/N)
Scorecard

Sri Lanka; 33/1 (7.3 overs)	v	Pakistan
Hasini Perera 21* (28); Fatima Sana 1/21 (4 overs)

No result
Colombo Cricket Club Ground, Colombo
Umpires: Lauren Agenbag (SA) and Kerrin Klaaste (SA)

- Sri Lanka won the toss and elected to bat.
- No further play was possible due to rain.

25 September 2025
15:00 (D/N)
Scorecard

England; 340/9 (50 overs)	v	India; 187 (34 overs)
Nat Sciver-Brunt 120 (104); Kranti Goud 3/31 (5 overs)		Jemimah Rodrigues 66 (68); Linsey Smith 2/35 (6 overs)

England won by 153 runs
BCCI Centre of Excellence Ground A, Bengaluru
Umpires: Sarah Dambanevana (Zim) and Eloise Sheridan (Aus)

- India won the toss and elected to field.

27 September 2025
15:00 (D/N)
Scorecard

Bangladesh; 242/8 (50 overs)	v	Sri Lanka; 241 (50 overs)
Sharmin Akhter 71 (101); Kavisha Dilhari 2/24 (6 overs)		Nilakshi de Silva 75 (78); Nahida Akter 3/28 (10 overs)

Bangladesh won by 1 run
Colombo Cricket Club Ground, Colombo
Umpires: Narayanan Janani (Ind) and Kerrin Klaaste (SA)

- Bangladesh won the toss and elected to bat.

27 September 2025
15:00 (D/N)
Scorecard

New Zealand; 232/8 (42 overs)	v	India; 237/6 (40.2 overs)
Sophie Devine 54 (54); Shree Charani 3/49 (9 overs)		Harmanpreet Kaur 69 (86); Bree Illing 2/34 (9 overs)

India won by 4 wickets (DLS method)
BCCI Centre of Excellence Ground A, Bengaluru
Umpires: Claire Polosak (Aus) and Jacqueline Williams (WI)

- New Zealand won the toss and elected to bat.
- The match was reduced to 42 overs per side due to rain.
- India were set a revised a target of 237 runs from 42 overs.

28 September 2025
15:00 (D/N)
Scorecard

Pakistan; 229 (46 overs)	v	South Africa; 233/6 (40.1 overs)
Fatima Sana 64 (75); Masabata Klaas 2/26 (5 overs)		Anneke Bosch 58 (59); Diana Baig 2/32 (6 overs)

South Africa won by 4 wickets
R. Premadasa Stadium, Colombo
Umpires: Candace la Borde (WI) and Narayanan Janani (Ind)

- Pakistan won the toss and elected to bat.

28 September 2025
15:00 (D/N)
Scorecard

Australia; 247 (34.4 overs)	v	England; 251/6 (44.3 overs)
Phoebe Litchfield 71 (48); Sarah Glenn 5/32 (7 overs)		Alice Capsey 88* (85); Kim Garth 2/17 (5 overs)

England won by 4 wickets
BCCI Centre of Excellence Ground A, Bengaluru
Umpires: Vrinda Rathi (Ind) and Gayathri Venugopalan (Ind)

- England won the toss and elected to field.

== League stage ==
=== Points table ===
Pos	Team	Pld	W	L	NR	Pts	NRR	Qualification
1	Australia	7	6	0	1	13	2.102	Advanced to the knockout stage
2	England	7	5	1	1	11	1.233	Advanced to the knockout stage
3	South Africa	7	5	2	0	10	−0.379	Advanced to the knockout stage
4	India (H)	7	3	3	1	7	0.628	Advanced to the knockout stage
5	Sri Lanka (H)	7	1	3	3	5	−1.035	
6	New Zealand	7	1	4	2	4	−0.876	
7	Bangladesh	7	1	5	1	3	−0.578	
8	Pakistan	7	0	4	3	3	−2.651	

Source: International Cricket Council
ESPN Cricinfo
(H) Host

Team	Group matches						
Team	1	2	3	4	5	6	7
Australia	2	3	5	7	9	11	13
Bangladesh	2	2	2	2	2	2	3
England	2	4	6	7	9	9	11
India (H)	2	4	4	4	4	6	7
New Zealand	0	0	2	3	4	4	4
Pakistan	0	0	0	1	2	2	3
Sri Lanka (H)	0	1	1	2	2	4	5
South Africa	0	2	4	6	8	10	10

Win	Loss	Tie	No result	Eliminated

- Note: The total points at the end of each group match are listed.
- Note: Click on the points or results to see the match summary.

=== Fixtures ===
The International Cricket Council (ICC) announced the schedule of the tournament on 16 June 2025. The revised schedule was announced on 22 August 2025.

Match 1
30 September 2025
15:00 (D/N)
Scorecard

India; 269/8 (47 overs)	v	Sri Lanka; 211 (45.4 overs)
Amanjot Kaur 57 (56); Inoka Ranaweera 4/46 (9 overs)		Chamari Athapaththu 43 (47); Deepti Sharma 3/54 (10 overs)

India won by 59 runs (DLS method)
Assam Cricket Association Stadium, Guwahati
Umpires: Claire Polosak (Aus) and Eloise Sheridan (Aus)
Player of the match: Deepti Sharma (Ind)

- Sri Lanka won the toss and elected to field.
- The match was reduced to 47 overs per side due to rain.
- Sri Lanka were set a revised target of 271 runs from 47 overs due to rain.
- This was the first women's ODI to be played at this venue.

Match 2
1 October 2025
15:00 (D/N)
Scorecard

Australia; 326 (49.3 overs)	v	New Zealand; 237 (43.2 overs)
Ashleigh Gardner 115 (83); Lea Tahuhu 3/42 (8 overs)		Sophie Devine 112 (112); Sophie Molineux 3/25 (8.2 overs)

Australia won by 89 runs
Holkar Stadium, Indore
Umpires: Sue Redfern (Eng) and Gayathri Venugopalan (Ind)
Player of the match: Ashleigh Gardner (Aus)

- Australia won the toss and elected to bat.
- This was the first women's ODI to be played at this venue.
- Phoebe Litchfield (Aus) scored her 1,000th run in ODIs.
- Amelia Kerr (NZ) took her 100th wicket in ODIs.
- Sophie Devine (NZ) scored her 4,000th run in ODIs.

Match 3
2 October 2025
15:00 (D/N)
Scorecard

Pakistan; 129 (38.3 overs)	v	Bangladesh; 131/3 (31.1 overs)
Rameen Shamim 23 (39); Shorna Akter 3/5 (3.3 overs)		Rubya Haider 54* (77); Diana Baig 1/14 (8 overs)

Bangladesh won by 7 wickets
R. Premadasa Stadium, Colombo
Umpires: Lauren Agenbag (SA) and Nimali Perera (SL)
Player of the match: Marufa Akter (Ban)

- Pakistan won the toss and elected to bat.
- Rubya Haider (Ban) made her ODI debut.

Match 4
3 October 2025
15:00 (D/N)
Scorecard

South Africa; 69 (20.4 overs)	v	England; 73/0 (14.1 overs)
Sinalo Jafta 22 (36); Linsey Smith 3/7 (4 overs)		Amy Jones 40* (50)

England won by 10 wickets
Assam Cricket Association Stadium, Guwahati
Umpires: Shathira Jakir (Ban) and Eloise Sheridan (Aus)
Player of the match: Linsey Smith (Eng)

- England won the toss and elected to field.
- Heather Knight (Eng) played in her 150th ODI match.

Match 5
4 October 2025
15:00 (D/N)
Scorecard

Sri Lanka	v	Australia

Match abandoned
R. Premadasa Stadium, Colombo
Umpires: Candace la Borde (WI) and Narayanan Janani (Ind)

- No toss.
- No play was possible due to rain.

Match 6
5 October 2025
15:00 (D/N)
Scorecard

India; 247 (50 overs)	v	Pakistan; 159 (43 overs)
Harleen Deol 46 (65); Diana Baig 4/69 (10 overs)		Sidra Ameen 81 (106); Kranti Goud 3/20 (10 overs)

India won by 88 runs
R. Premadasa Stadium, Colombo
Umpires: Lauren Agenbag (SA) and Nimali Perera (SL)
Player of the match: Kranti Goud (Ind)

- Pakistan won the toss and elected to field.
- Fatima Sana (Pak) played in her 100th international match.
- Deepti Sharma (Ind) scored her 4,000th run in international cricket.

Match 7
6 October 2025
15:00 (D/N)
Scorecard

New Zealand; 231 (47.5 overs)	v	South Africa; 234/4 (40.5 overs)
Sophie Devine 85 (98); Nonkululeko Mlaba 4/40 (10 overs)		Tazmin Brits 101 (89); Amelia Kerr 2/62 (10 overs)

South Africa won by 6 wickets
Holkar Stadium, Indore
Umpires: Sarah Dambanevana (Zim) and Shathira Jakir (Ban)
Player of the match: Tazmin Brits (SA)

- New Zealand won the toss and elected to bat.
- Suzie Bates (NZ) became the first women's cricketer to make 350 appearances in international cricket.
- Sophie Devine (NZ) played in her 300th international match.
- Chloe Tryon (SA) took her 100th wicket in international cricket.
- Laura Wolvaardt (SA) scored her 7,000th run in international cricket.

Match 8
7 October 2025
15:00 (D/N)
Scorecard

Bangladesh; 178 (49.4 overs)	v	England; 182/6 (46.1 overs)
Sobhana Mostary 60 (108); Sophie Ecclestone 3/24 (10 overs)		Heather Knight 79* (111); Fahima Khatun 3/16 (10 overs)

England won by 4 wickets
Assam Cricket Association Stadium, Guwahati
Umpires: Claire Polosak (Aus) and Vrinda Rathi (Ind)
Player of the match: Heather Knight (Eng)

- England won the toss and elected to field.

Match 9
8 October 2025
15:00 (D/N)
Scorecard

Australia; 221/9 (50 overs)	v	Pakistan; 114 (36.3 overs)
Beth Mooney 109 (114); Nashra Sandhu 3/37 (10 overs)		Sidra Ameen 35 (52); Kim Garth 3/14 (6 overs)

Australia won by 107 runs
R. Premadasa Stadium, Colombo
Umpires: Narayanan Janani (Ind) and Kerrin Klaaste (SA)
Player of the match: Beth Mooney (Aus)

- Pakistan won the toss and elected to field.
- The 106-run partnership between Beth Mooney and Alana King (Aus) broke the record for the highest partnership for the 9th wicket in Women's ODIs, surpassing Ashleigh Gardner and Kim Garth's 77-run stand in 2024.
- Annabel Sutherland (Aus) took her 100th wicket in international cricket.

Match 10
9 October 2025
15:00 (D/N)
Scorecard

India; 251 (49.5 overs)	v	South Africa; 252/7 (48.5 overs)
Richa Ghosh 94 (77); Chloe Tryon 3/32 (10 overs)		Nadine de Klerk 84* (54); Sneh Rana 2/47 (10 overs)

South Africa won by 3 wickets
ACA–VDCA Cricket Stadium, Visakhapatnam
Umpires: Kim Cotton (NZ) and Jacqueline Williams (WI)
Player of the match: Nadine de Klerk (SA)

- South Africa won the toss and elected to field.
- Laura Wolvaardt (SA) played in her 200th international match.
- Richa Ghosh (Ind) scored her 1,000th run in ODIs.
- The 88-run partnership between Richa Ghosh and Sneh Rana was India's highest for the 8th wicket in Women's ODIs.

Match 11
10 October 2025
15:00 (D/N)
Scorecard

New Zealand; 227/9 (50 overs)	v	Bangladesh; 127 (39.5 overs)
Brooke Halliday 69 (104); Rabeya Khan 3/30 (10 overs)		Fahima Khatun 34 (80); Jess Kerr 3/21 (8 overs)

New Zealand won by 100 runs
Assam Cricket Association Stadium, Guwahati
Umpires: Sarah Dambanevana (Zim) and Claire Polosak (Aus)
Player of the match: Brooke Halliday (NZ)

- New Zealand won the toss and elected to bat.
- Lea Tahuhu (NZ) played in her 100th ODI match.
- Brooke Halliday (NZ) scored her 1,000th run in ODIs.

Match 12
11 October 2025
15:00 (D/N)
Scorecard

England; 253/9 (50 overs)	v	Sri Lanka; 164 (45.4 overs)
Nat Sciver-Brunt 117 (117); Inoka Ranaweera 3/33 (10 overs)		Hasini Perera 35 (60); Sophie Ecclestone 4/17 (10 overs)

England won by 89 runs
R. Premadasa Stadium, Colombo
Umpires: Kerrin Klaaste (SA) and Vrinda Rathi (Ind)
Player of the match: Nat Sciver-Brunt (Eng)

- Sri Lanka won the toss and elected to field.
- Nat Sciver-Brunt (Eng) scored her 8,000th run in international cricket.

Match 13
12 October 2025
15:00 (D/N)
Scorecard

India; 330 (48.5 overs)	v	Australia; 331/7 (49 overs)
Smriti Mandhana 80 (66); Annabel Sutherland 5/40 (9.5 overs)		Alyssa Healy 142 (107); Shree Charani 3/41 (10 overs)

Australia won by 3 wickets
ACA–VDCA Cricket Stadium, Visakhapatnam
Umpires: Nimali Perera (SL) and Sue Redfern (Eng)
Player of the match: Alyssa Healy (Aus)

- Australia won the toss and elected to field.
- Smriti Mandhana (Ind) scored her 5,000th run in ODIs.
- Harleen Deol (Ind) scored her 1,000th run in ODIs.
- Annabel Sutherland (Aus) took her first five-wicket haul in ODIs.
- This was the highest successful chase in Women's ODIs.

Match 14
13 October 2025
15:00 (D/N)
Scorecard

Bangladesh; 232/6 (50 overs)	v	South Africa; 235/7 (49.3 overs)
Shorna Akter 51* (35); Nonkululeko Mlaba 2/42 (10 overs)		Chloe Tryon 62 (69); Nahida Akter 2/44 (9.3 overs)

South Africa won by 3 wickets
ACA–VDCA Cricket Stadium, Visakhapatnam
Umpires: Candace la Borde (WI) and Jacqueline Williams (WI)
Player of the match: Chloe Tryon (SA)

- Bangladesh won the toss and elected to bat.

Match 15
14 October 2025
15:00 (D/N)
Scorecard

Sri Lanka; 258/6 (50 overs)	v	New Zealand
Nilakshi de Silva 55* (28); Sophie Devine 3/54 (9 overs)

No result
R. Premadasa Stadium, Colombo
Umpires: Eloise Sheridan (Aus) and Gayathri Venugopalan (Ind)

- Sri Lanka won the toss and elected to bat.
- No further play was possible due to rain.
- Nilakshi de Silva (SL) scored her 1,000th run in ODIs.

Match 16
15 October 2025
15:00 (D/N)
Scorecard

England; 133/9 (31 overs)	v	Pakistan; 34/0 (6.4 overs)
Charlie Dean 33 (51); Fatima Sana 4/27 (6 overs)		Omaima Sohail 19* (18)

No result
R. Premadasa Stadium, Colombo
Umpires: Shathira Jakir (Ban) and Claire Polosak (Aus)

- Pakistan won the toss and elected to field.
- The match was reduced to 31 overs per side due to rain.
- Pakistan were set a revised target of 113 runs from 31 overs due to rain.
- No further play was possible due to rain.
- Sophia Dunkley (Eng) scored her 1,000th run in ODIs.

Match 17
16 October 2025
15:00 (D/N)
Scorecard

Bangladesh; 198/9 (50 overs)	v	Australia; 202/0 (24.5 overs)
Sobhana Mostary 66* (80); Alana King 2/18 (10 overs)		Alyssa Healy 113* (77)

Australia won by 10 wickets
ACA–VDCA Cricket Stadium, Visakhapatnam
Umpires: Candace la Borde (WI) and Sarah Dambanevana (Zim)
Player of the match: Alana King (Aus)

- Bangladesh won the toss and elected to bat.
- Alyssa Healy (Aus) scored her 7,000th run in international cricket.
- Australia qualified for the semi-finals as a result of this match.

Match 18
17 October 2025
15:00 (D/N)
Scorecard

Sri Lanka; 105/7 (20 overs)	v	South Africa; 125/0 (14.5 overs)
Vishmi Gunaratne 34 (33); Nonkululeko Mlaba 3/30 (4 overs)		Laura Wolvaardt 60* (47)

South Africa won by 10 wickets (DLS method)
R. Premadasa Stadium, Colombo
Umpires: Vrinda Rathi (Ind) and Gayathri Venugopalan (Ind)
Player of the match: Laura Wolvaardt (SA)

- Sri Lanka won the toss and elected to bat.
- The match was reduced to 20 overs per side due to rain.
- South Africa were set a revised target of 121 runs from 20 overs due to rain.

Match 19
18 October 2025
15:00 (D/N)
Scorecard

Pakistan; 92/5 (25 overs)	v	New Zealand
Aliya Riaz 28* (52); Lea Tahuhu 2/20 (6 overs)

No result
R. Premadasa Stadium, Colombo
Umpires: Narayanan Janani (Ind) and Kerrin Klaaste (SA)

- New Zealand won the toss and elected to field.
- The match was reduced to 46 overs per side due to rain.
- No further play was possible due to rain.
- Omaima Sohail (Pak) played in her 100th international match.
- Amelia Kerr (NZ) took her 200th wicket in international cricket.
- South Africa qualified for the semi-finals as a result of this match.

Match 20
19 October 2025
15:00 (D/N)
Scorecard

England; 288/8 (50 overs)	v	India; 284/6 (50 overs)
Heather Knight 109 (91); Deepti Sharma 4/51 (10 overs)		Smriti Mandhana 88 (94); Nat Sciver-Brunt 2/47 (8 overs)

England won by 4 runs
Holkar Stadium, Indore
Umpires: Kim Cotton (NZ) and Jacqueline Williams (WI)
Player of the match: Heather Knight (Eng)

- England won the toss and elected to bat.
- Heather Knight (Eng) played in her 300th international match.
- Deepti Sharma became the second bowler and first spinner for India to take 150 wickets in ODIs.
- England qualified for the semi-finals as a result of this match.

Match 21
20 October 2025
15:00 (D/N)
Scorecard

Sri Lanka; 202 (48.4 overs)	v	Bangladesh; 195/9 (50 overs)
Hasini Perera 85 (99); Shorna Akter 3/27 (10 overs)		Nigar Sultana 77 (98); Chamari Athapaththu 4/42 (10 overs)

Sri Lanka won by 7 runs
DY Patil Stadium, Navi Mumbai
Umpires: Candace la Borde (WI) and Sarah Dambanevana (Zim)
Player of the match: Hasini Perera (SL)

- Sri Lanka won the toss and elected to bat.
- This was the first women's ODI to be played at this venue.
- Hasini Perera (SL) scored her 1,000th run in ODIs.
- Chamari Athapaththu (SL) scored her 4,000th run in ODIs.
- Bangladesh were eliminated as a result of this match.

Match 22
21 October 2025
15:00 (D/N)
Scorecard

South Africa; 312/9 (40 overs)	v	Pakistan; 83/7 (20 overs)
Laura Wolvaardt 90 (82); Nashra Sandhu 3/45 (8 overs)		Sidra Nawaz 22* (33); Marizanne Kapp 3/20 (5 overs)

South Africa won by 150 runs (DLS method)
R. Premadasa Stadium, Colombo
Umpires: Narayanan Janani (Ind) and Eloise Sheridan (Aus)
Player of the match: Marizanne Kapp (SA)

- Pakistan won the toss and elected to field.
- The match was reduced to 40 overs per side due to rain.
- Pakistan were set a revised target of 234 runs from 20 overs due to rain.
- Pakistan were eliminated as a result of this match.

Match 23
22 October 2025
15:00 (D/N)
Scorecard

England; 244/9 (50 overs)	v	Australia; 248/4 (40.3 overs)
Tammy Beaumont 78 (105); Annabel Sutherland 3/60 (10 overs)		Ashleigh Gardner 104* (73); Linsey Smith 2/43 (8 overs)

Australia won by 6 wickets
Holkar Stadium, Indore
Umpires: Kim Cotton (NZ) and Jacqueline Williams (WI)
Player of the match: Annabel Sutherland (Aus)

- Australia won the toss and elected to field.

Match 24
23 October 2025
15:00 (D/N)
Scorecard

India; 340/3 (49 overs)	v	New Zealand; 271/8 (44 overs)
Pratika Rawal 122 (134); Suzie Bates 1/40 (7 overs)		Brooke Halliday 81 (84); Renuka Singh 2/25 (6 overs)

India won by 53 runs (DLS method)
DY Patil Stadium, Navi Mumbai
Umpires: Lauren Agenbag (SA) and Sue Redfern (Eng)
Player of the match: Smriti Mandhana (Ind)

- New Zealand won the toss and elected to field.
- The match was reduced to 49 overs per side due to rain.
- New Zealand were set a revised target of 325 runs from 44 overs due to rain.
- Lea Tahuhu (NZ) played in her 200th international match.
- Pratika Rawal (Ind) became the joint-fastest cricketer, in the terms of innings (23), to score 1,000 runs in women's ODIs.
- India's 340 was their highest innings total in World Cups and against New Zealand in women's ODIs.
- Renuka Singh (Ind) took her 100th wicket in international cricket.
- India qualified for the semi-finals, while New Zealand and Sri Lanka were eliminated as a result of this match.

Match 25
24 October 2025
15:00 (D/N)
Scorecard

Pakistan; 18/0 (4.2 overs)	v	Sri Lanka
Omaima Sohail 9* (9)

No result
R. Premadasa Stadium, Colombo
Umpires: Kerrin Klaaste (SA) and Vrinda Rathi (Ind)

- Sri Lanka won the toss and elected to field.
- No further play was possible due to rain.
- Sidra Ameen (Pak) played in her 150th international match.

Match 26
25 October 2025
15:00 (D/N)
Scorecard

South Africa; 97 (24 overs)	v	Australia; 98/3 (16.5 overs)
Laura Wolvaardt 31 (26); Alana King 7/18 (7 overs)		Beth Mooney 42 (41); Marizanne Kapp 1/11 (4 overs)

Australia won by 7 wickets
Holkar Stadium, Indore
Umpires: Kim Cotton (NZ) and Nimali Perera (SL)
Player of the match: Alana King (Aus)

- Australia won the toss and elected to field.

Match 27
26 October 2025
11:00
Scorecard

New Zealand; 168 (38.2 overs)	v	England; 172/2 (29.2 overs)
Georgia Plimmer 43 (57); Linsey Smith 3/30 (9.2 overs)		Amy Jones 86* (92); Lea Tahuhu 1/9 (4 overs)

England won by 8 wickets
ACA–VDCA Cricket Stadium, Visakhapatnam
Umpires: Shathira Jakir (Ban) and Gayathri Venugopalan (Ind)
Player of the match: Amy Jones (Eng)

- New Zealand won the toss and elected to bat.
- Maddy Green (NZ) played in her 200th international match.
- Sophie Devine (NZ) played in her last ODI match.

Match 28
26 October 2025
15:00 (D/N)
Scorecard

Bangladesh; 119/9 (27 overs)	v	India; 57/0 (8.4 overs)
Sharmin Akhter 36 (53); Radha Yadav 3/30 (6 overs)		Smriti Mandhana 34* (27)

No result
DY Patil Stadium, Navi Mumbai
Umpires: Lauren Agenbag (SA) and Sue Redfern (Eng)

- India won the toss and elected to field.
- The match was reduced to 27 overs per side due to rain.
- India were set a revised target of 126 runs from 27 overs.
- No further play was possible due to rain.
- Uma Chetry (Ind) made her ODI debut.
- Sobhana Mostary (Ban) scored her 1,000th run in international cricket.

== Knockout stage ==
=== Bracket ===
Semi-finals
4	India	341/5 (48.3 overs)
1	Australia	338 (49.5 overs)
2	England	194 (42.3 overs)
3	South Africa	319/7 (50 overs)

Final
India	298/7 (50 overs)
South Africa	246 (45.3 overs)

=== Semi-finals ===
Semi-final 1
29 October 2025
15:00 (D/N)
Scorecard

South Africa; 319/7 (50 overs)	v	England; 194 (42.3 overs)
Laura Wolvaardt 169 (143); Sophie Ecclestone 4/44 (10 overs)		Nat Sciver-Brunt 64 (76); Marizanne Kapp 5/20 (7 overs)

South Africa won by 125 runs
Assam Cricket Association Stadium, Guwahati
Umpires: Eloise Sheridan (Aus) and Jacqueline Williams (WI)
Player of the match: Laura Wolvaardt (SA)

- England won the toss and elected to field.
- Laura Wolvaardt (SA) scored her 5,000th run in ODIs.
- Marizanne Kapp (SA) broke Jhulan Goswami’s record to become the highest wicket-taker in Women’s ODI World Cup history.
- South Africa qualified for the Women's World Cup final for the first time.

Semi-final 2
30 October 2025
15:00 (D/N)
Scorecard

Australia; 338 (49.5 overs)	v	India; 341/5 (48.3 overs)
Phoebe Litchfield 119 (93); Shree Charani 2/49 (10 overs)		Jemimah Rodrigues 127* (134); Kim Garth 2/46 (7 overs)

India won by 5 wickets
DY Patil Stadium, Navi Mumbai
Umpires: Lauren Agenbag (SA) and Sue Redfern (Eng)
Player of the match: Jemimah Rodrigues (Ind)

- Australia won the toss and elected to bat.
- Richa Ghosh (Ind) played in her 50th ODI match.
- Annabel Sutherland (Aus) played in her 100th international match.
- This was the highest successful chase in Women's ODIs.

=== Final ===
Final
2 November 2025
15:00 (D/N)
Scorecard

India; 298/7 (50 overs)	v	South Africa; 246 (45.3 overs)
Shafali Verma 87 (78); Ayabonga Khaka 3/58 (9 overs)		Laura Wolvaardt 101 (98); Deepti Sharma 5/39 (9.3 overs)

India won by 52 runs
DY Patil Stadium, Navi Mumbai
Umpires: Eloise Sheridan (Aus) and Jacqueline Williams (WI)
Player of the match: Shafali Verma (Ind)

- South Africa won the toss and elected to field.
- Laura Wolvaardt (SA) became the first captain to score a century in the Women's World Cup final.
- India won their maiden World Cup title.

== Statistics ==
=== Most runs ===
Runs	Player	Mat	Inn	NO	Avg	HS	SR	100s	50s
571	(South Africa) Laura Wolvaardt	9	9	1	67.14	169	97.91	2	3
434	(India) Smriti Mandhana	9	9	1	54.25	109	99.08	1	2
328	(Australia) Ashleigh Gardner	7	5	1	82.00	142	130.15	2	1
308	(India) Pratika Rawal	7	6	0	51.33	122	77.77	1	1
304	(Australia) Phoebe Litchfield	7	7	1	50.66	119	112.59	1	1

=== Most wickets ===
Wickets	Player	Mat	Inn	BBI	Avg	Econ	SR	4W	5W
22	(India) Deepti Sharma	9	9	5/39	20.40	5.52	22.18	1	1
17	(Australia) Annabel Sutherland	7	7	5/40	15.82	4.45	21.29	0	1
16	(England) Sophie Ecclestone	7	7	4/17	14.25	4.05	21.06	2	0
14	(India) Shree Charani	9	9	3/41	27.64	4.96	33.42	0	0
13	(Australia) Alana King	7	7	7/18	17.38	4.03	25.84	0	1
13	(South Africa) Nonkululeko Mlaba	9	9	4/40	22.69	4.83	28.15	1	0

=== Highest individual score ===
Score	Player	4s	6s	SR	Against	Venue	Date
169 (143)	(South Africa) Laura Wolvaardt	20	4	118.18	England	Guwahati	29 October 2025
142 (107)	(Australia) Alyssa Healy	21	3	132.71	India	Visakhapatnam	12 October 2025
127* (134)	(India) Jemimah Rodrigues	14	0	94.78	Australia	Navi Mumbai	30 October 2025
122 (134)	(India) Pratika Rawal	13	2	91.04	New Zealand	Navi Mumbai	23 October 2025
119 (93)	(Australia) Phoebe Litchfield	17	3	127.96	India	Navi Mumbai	30 October 2025

=== Best bowling figures ===
Figure	Player	Ov	M	Econ	Against	Venue	Date
7–18	(Australia) Alana King	7.0	2	2.57	South Africa	Indore	25 October 2025
5–20	(South Africa) Marizanne Kapp	7.0	3	2.85	England	Guwahati	29 October 2025
5–39	(India) Deepti Sharma	9.3	0	4.10	South Africa	Navi Mumbai	2 November 2025
5–40	(Australia) Annabel Sutherland	9.5	0	4.06	India	Visakhapatnam	12 October 2025
4–17	(England) Sophie Ecclestone	10.0	3	1.70	Sri Lanka	Colombo	11 October 2025

=== Highest team totals ===
Score	Team	Against	Venue	Result	Date
341/5 (48.3 overs)	India	Australia	Navi Mumbai	Won	30 October 2025
340/3 (49 overs)	India	New Zealand	Navi Mumbai	Won	23 October 2025
338 (49.5 overs)	Australia	India	Navi Mumbai	Lost	30 October 2025
331/7 (49 overs)	Australia	India	Visakhapatnam	Won	12 October 2025
330 (48.5 overs)	India	Australia	Visakhapatnam	Lost	12 October 2025

=== Team of the tournament ===
The ICC announced the team of the tournament on 4 November 2025, with Deepti Sharma being named as player of the tournament, and Laura Wolvaardt as captain of the team.

Player	Role
(India) Smriti Mandhana	Opening batter
(South Africa) Laura Wolvaardt	Opening batter/captain
(India) Jemimah Rodrigues	Batter
(South Africa) Marizanne Kapp	All-rounder
(Australia) Ashleigh Gardner	All-rounder
(India) Deepti Sharma	All-rounder
(Australia) Annabel Sutherland	All-rounder
(South Africa) Nadine de Klerk	All-rounder
(Pakistan) Sidra Nawaz	Wicket-keeper batter
(Australia) Alana King	Bowler
(England) Sophie Ecclestone	Bowler
(England) Nat Sciver-Brunt	Twelfth player

== Broadcasting ==
Broadcasters for the tournament
Region	Country/Sub-region	Broadcasting licensee(s)	Broadcasting platform(s)
Africa	Middle East and North Africa	E&	CricLife Max, StarzPlay
Africa	Sub-Saharan Africa	SuperSport	SS Cricket, DStv
Americas	Canada	Willow	Willow TV, Cricbuzz
Americas	Caribbean Islands	ESPN	ESPN Caribbean, ESPN Play
Americas	United States	Willow	Willow TV, Cricbuzz
Asia	Bangladesh	TSM	Nagorik TV, T Sports, Toffee
Asia	India	JioStar	Star Sports, JioHotstar
Asia	Pakistan	PTV	PTV Sports, Myco Tamasha
Asia	Pakistan	Ten Sports	Ten Sports
Asia	Sri Lanka	Maharaja TV	TV 1
Asia	Sri Lanka	JioStar	Star Sports
Asia	Singapore	StarHub	Hub Sports
Asia	Malaysia & Hong Kong	Astro SuperSport	Astro Cricket
Europe	Ireland	Sky Sports	Sky Sports Cricket
Europe	United Kingdom	Sky Sports	Sky Sports Cricket
Oceania	Australia	Amazon	Prime Video
Oceania	New Zealand	Sky TV NZ	Sky Sport, Sky Go
Oceania	Papua New Guinea	PNG Digicel	TVWan

Outside the listed regions, all matches will also be available for streaming worldwide via the official broadcast channel on ICC.tv
