= 2022 Women's Cricket World Cup final =

Women's Cricket World Cup final

2022 ICC Women's World Cup Final
- Event: 2022 Women's Cricket World Cup
| Australia | England |
| (Australia) | (England) |
| 356/5 | 285 |
| 50 overs | 43.4 overs |
- Australia won by 71 runs
- Date: 3 April 2022
- Venue: Hagley Oval, Christchurch
- Player of the match: Alyssa Healy (Aus)
- Umpires: Lauren Agenbag (SA) and Kim Cotton (NZ)

The 2022 ICC Women's World Cup final was a Women's One Day International (WODI) cricket match played between Australia and the defending champions England to decide the winner of the 2022 Women's World Cup. Australia won by 71 runs to secure their seventh World Cup title, with Alyssa Healy named player of the match.

In England, the final was simulcast live on Pick, Sky’s free-to-air TV channel.

== Background ==
The 2022 Women's Cricket World Cup was the twelfth edition of the Women's Cricket World Cup, which was held in New Zealand in March and April 2022. It was originally scheduled to be held in February and March 2021 but was postponed by one year due to the COVID-19 pandemic. On 15 December 2021, the International Cricket Council (ICC) announced that the tournament would start on 4 March 2022, with the final scheduled for 3 April 2022.

This was Australia's seventh world cup final, while England reached their sixth world cup final, having been runners-up in 1982 and 1988 against Australia. This was also the third time that Australia and England faced each other in a final.

== Route to the Final ==
| Australia | | Round | England |
|---|---|---|---|---|
| Opponent | Result | League Stage | Opponent | Result |
| England | Australia won by 12 runs | Match 1 | Australia | Australia won by 12 runs |
| Pakistan | Australia won by 7 wkts | Match 2 | West Indies | West Indies won by 7 runs |
| New Zealand | Australia won by 141 runs | Match 3 | South Africa | South Africa won by 3 wkts |
| West Indies | Australia won by 7 wkts | Match 4 | India | England won by 4 wkts |
| India | Australia won by 6 wkts | Match 5 | New Zealand | England won by 1 wkt |
| South Africa | Australia won by 5 wkts | Match 6 | Pakistan | England won by 9 wkts |
| Bangladesh | Australia won by 5 wkts | Match 7 | Bangladesh | England won by 100 runs |
| 1st in league stage: Pos. / Team / P / W / L / NR / Pts / NRR / Qualification; 1 / Australia / 7 / 7 / 0 / 0 / 14 / 1.283 / Semifinalists | | League standing | 3rd in league stage: Pos. / Team / P / W / L / NR / Pts / NRR / Qualification; 3 / England / 7 / 4 / 3 / 0 / 8 / 0.949 / Semifinalists |
| Semifinal 1 | | Knockout | Semifinal 2 |
| Opponent | Result | | Opponent | Result |
| West Indies | Australia won by 157 runs | | South Africa | England won by 137 runs |
2022 Women's Cricket World Cup Final

== Match ==
=== Match officials ===
- On-field umpires: Lauren Agenbag (SA) and Kim Cotton (NZ)
- TV umpire: Jacqueline Williams (WI)
- Reserve umpire: Langton Rusere (Zim)
- Match referee: G. S. Lakshmi (Ind)

=== Match details ===
Final
3 April 2022
13:00 (D/N)
Scorecard

| Australia; 356/5 (50 overs) | v | England; 285 (43.4 overs) |
| Alyssa Healy 170 (138); Anya Shrubsole 3/46 (10 overs) | | Nat Sciver 148* (121); Jess Jonassen 3/57 (8.4 overs) |

Australia Women won by 71 runs
Hagley Oval, Christchurch
Umpires: Lauren Agenbag (SA) and Kim Cotton (NZ)
Player of the match: Alyssa Healy (Aus)

- England Women won the toss and elected to field.
- Meg Lanning (Aus) played in her 100th WODI.
- Australia won their record seventh world cup title.

=== Scorecard ===
1st innings

Australia batting
| Player | Status | Runs | Balls | 4s | 6s | Strike rate |
|---|---|---|---|---|---|---|
| Alyssa Healy | st †Jones b Shrubsole | 170 | 138 | 26 | 0 | 123.18 |
| Rachael Haynes | c Beaumont b Ecclestone | 68 | 93 | 7 | 0 | 73.11 |
| Beth Mooney | c Sciver b Shrubsole | 62 | 47 | 8 | 0 | 131.91 |
| Ashleigh Gardner | run out (Cross/Shrubsole) | 1 | 2 | 0 | 0 | 50.00 |
| Meg Lanning | c Beaumont b Shrubsole | 10 | 5 | 2 | 0 | 200.00 |
| Tahlia McGrath | not out | 8 | 5 | 1 | 0 | 160.00 |
| Ellyse Perry | not out | 17 | 10 | 2 | 0 | 170.00 |
| Jess Jonassen | | | | | | |
| Alana King | | | | | | |
| Megan Schutt | | | | | | |
| Darcie Brown | | | | | | |
| Extras | (b 4, lb 2, w 14) | 20 | | | | |
| Total | (5 wickets; 50 overs) | 356 | | 46 | 0 | RR 7.12 |

Fall of wickets: 1/160 (Haynes, 29.1 ov), 2/316 (Healy, 45.3 ov), 3/318 (Gardner, 45.6 ov), 4/331 (Lanning, 47.2 ov), 5/331 (Mooney, 47.3 ov)

England bowling
| Bowler | Overs | Maidens | Runs | Wickets | Econ | Wides | NBs |
|---|---|---|---|---|---|---|---|
| Katherine Sciver-Brunt | 10 | 0 | 69 | 0 | 6.90 | 1 | 0 |
| Anya Shrubsole | 10 | 0 | 46 | 3 | 4.60 | 1 | 0 |
| Nat Sciver-Brunt | 8 | 0 | 65 | 0 | 8.12 | 1 | 0 |
| Charlie Dean | 4 | 0 | 34 | 0 | 8.50 | 1 | 0 |
| Sophie Ecclestone | 10 | 0 | 71 | 1 | 7.10 | 2 | 0 |
| Kate Cross | 8 | 0 | 65 | 0 | 8.12 | 4 | 0 |

2nd innings

England batting
| Player | Status | Runs | Balls | 4s | 6s | Strike rate |
|---|---|---|---|---|---|---|
| Tammy Beaumont | lbw b Schutt | 27 | 26 | 5 | 0 | 103.84 |
| Danni Wyatt-Hodge | b Schutt | 4 | 5 | 1 | 0 | 80.00 |
| Heather Knight | lbw b King | 26 | 25 | 4 | 0 | 104.00 |
| Nat Sciver-Brunt | not out | 148 | 121 | 15 | 1 | 122.31 |
| Amy Jones | c King b Jonassen | 20 | 18 | 2 | 0 | 111.11 |
| Sophia Dunkley | b King | 22 | 22 | 1 | 0 | 100.00 |
| Katherine Sciver-Brunt | st †Healy b King | 1 | 4 | 0 | 0 | 25.00 |
| Sophie Ecclestone | lbw b McGrath | 3 | 10 | 0 | 0 | 30.00 |
| Kate Cross | c & b Jonassen | 2 | 3 | 0 | 0 | 66.66 |
| Charlie Dean | c Jonassen b Gardner | 21 | 24 | 1 | 0 | 87.50 |
| Anya Shrubsole | c Gardner b Jonassen | 1 | 4 | 0 | 0 | 25.00 |
| Extras | (lb 4, w 6) | 10 | | | | |
| Total | (all out; 43.4 overs) | 285 | | 29 | 0 | RR 6.52 |

Fall of wickets: 1/12 (Wyatt-Hodge, 2.1 ov), 2/38 (Beaumont, 6.3 ov), 3/86 (Knight, 14.6 ov), 4/129 (Jones, 20.3 ov), 5/179 (Dunkley, 27.6 ov), 6/191 (Katherine, 29.4 ov), 7/206 (Ecclestone, 32.4 ov), 8/213 (Cross, 33.4 ov), 9/278 (Dean, 42.3 ov), 10/285 (Shrubsole, 43.4 ov)

Australia bowling
| Bowler | Overs | Maidens | Runs | Wickets | Econ | Wides | NBs |
|---|---|---|---|---|---|---|---|
| Megan Schutt | 8 | 0 | 42 | 2 | 5.25 | 2 | 0 |
| Darcie Brown | 7 | 0 | 57 | 0 | 8.14 | 4 | 0 |
| Alana King | 10 | 0 | 64 | 3 | 6.40 | 0 | 0 |
| Tahlia McGrath | 8 | 0 | 46 | 1 | 5.75 | 0 | 0 |
| Jess Jonassen | 8.4 | 0 | 57 | 3 | 6.57 | 0 | 0 |
| Ashleigh Gardner | 2 | 0 | 15 | 1 | 7.50 | 0 | 0 |
