= Nat Sciver-Brunt =

English cricketer (born 1992)

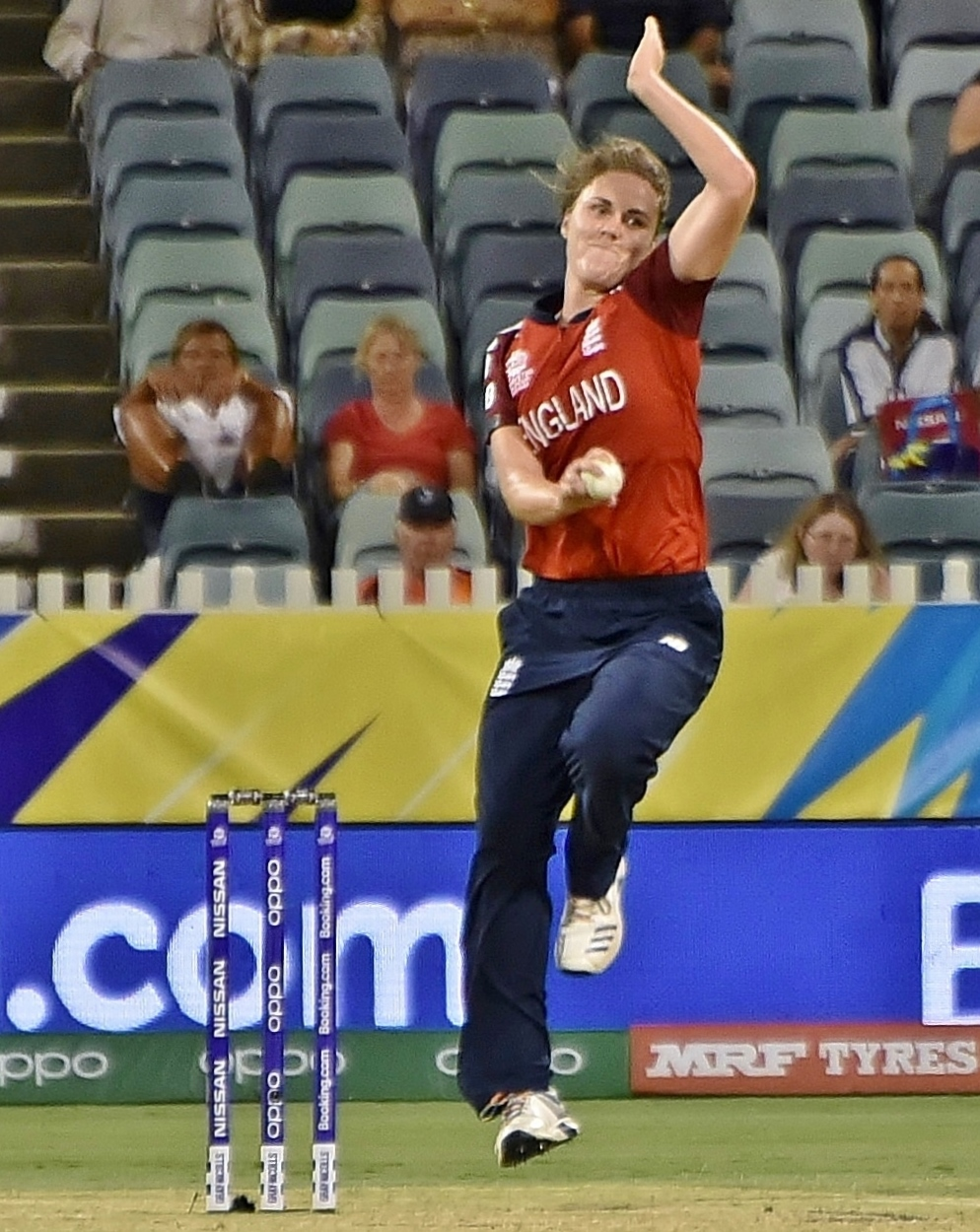
- Sciver bowling for England in 2020 Women's T20 World Cup match.

Personal information
- Full name: Natalie Ruth Sciver-Brunt
- Born: 20 August 1992 (age 34); Tokyo, Japan
- Batting: Right-handed
- Bowling: Right arm medium
- Role: All-rounder
- Relatives: Julia Longbottom (mother); Katherine Sciver-Brunt (spouse)

International information
- National side: England (2013–present)
- Test debut (cap 153): 10 January 2014 v Australia
- Last Test: 10 July 2026 v India
- ODI debut (cap 122): 1 July 2013 v Pakistan
- Last ODI: 29 October 2025 v South Africa
- ODI shirt no.: 39
- T20I debut (cap 34): 5 July 2013 v Pakistan
- Last T20I: 1 July 2025 v India
- T20I shirt no.: 39

Domestic team information
- Years: Team
- 2010–present: Surrey
- 2015/16–2016/17: Melbourne Stars
- 2016–2019: Surrey Stars
- 2017/18: Perth Scorchers
- 2019: Supernovas
- 2019/20: Perth Scorchers
- 2020–2022: Northern Diamonds
- 2020/21: Melbourne Stars
- 2021–present: Trent Rockets
- 2023–present: Mumbai Indians
- 2023–present: The Blaze
- 2023/24-2024/25: Perth Scorchers
- 2025/26-present: Hobart Hurricanes

Career statistics
Competition	WTest	WODI	WT20I
Matches	12	129	137
Runs scored	883	4354	2,960
Batting average	46.47	46.31	29.01
100s/50s	2/5	10/26	0/18
Top score	169*	148*	82
Balls bowled	1057	3620	1,902
Wickets	12	88	90
Bowling average	38.41	31.07	23.28
5 wickets in innings	0	0	0
10 wickets in match	0	0	0
Best bowling	3/41	4/59	4/15
Catches/stumpings	10/–	53/–	72/–
Medal record
Women's cricket
Representing England
T20 World Cup
Runner-up	2026 England
- Source: ESPNCricinfo, 29 October 2025

Natalie Ruth Sciver-Brunt (née Sciver; /ˈsɪvər/ SIV-ər; born 20 August 1992) is an English cricketer who represents England in all formats. She was the first cricketer for England to take a hat-trick in a Women's Twenty20 International match. The "Natmeg" shot is named after Sciver-Brunt, from when she has hit a cricket ball through her legs during a game.

On 7 March 2021, Sciver-Brunt captained the England team for the first time in international cricket, for the third WT20I match against New Zealand, after Heather Knight was ruled out of the fixture due to an injury.

On 6 September 2022, Sciver-Brunt was named as England's captain for their home WT20I series against India in the absence of Heather Knight. Two days later, however, Sciver-Brunt announced that she had decided to withdraw from the series "to focus on her mental health and well being".

== Early life and education ==
Sciver-Brunt was born in Tokyo, Japan. Her mother, Julia Longbottom, a British diplomat, was based in Japan at the time of Sciver-Brunt's birth, and has been the Ambassador of the United Kingdom to Japan since March 2021. Sciver-Brunt's father, Richard, is a business executive.

As a child, Sciver-Brunt also lived in Poland, where she played in women's league football, and the Netherlands, where she played basketball.

Sciver-Brunt also attended Epsom College, Surrey, England, where, between 2007 and 2011, she played cricket alongside her future England teammate and fellow Test centurion Alice Davidson-Richards. She then studied sports and exercise science at Loughborough University.

== Career ==
She began playing cricket as a teenager, and played for Surrey club side Stoke d'Abernon. She also played cricket at school, playing in the Epsom College school 1st XI for two seasons. After a period in Surrey's Academy she played for the Surrey county team and progressed to the England Women's Academy. After some successful games in the academy team, she was selected for the 2013 limited-overs series against Pakistan where she made her debut for the full England side. In a WT20I game against New Zealand, she became the first England cricketer to take an international T20 hat-trick.

She is the holder of one of the first tranche of 18 ECB central contracts for women players, which were announced in April 2014.

In April 2015, she was named as one of the England women's Academy squad tour to Dubai, where England women played their Australian counterparts in two 50-over games and two Twenty20 matches.

She, along with Heather Knight, set the highest 3rd wicket stand in the history of the Women's Cricket World Cup (213) during the 2017 edition. In the same World Cup, Sciver-Brunt along with Tammy Beaumont set the highest record partnership for the 4th wicket (170) in Women's World Cup history. Sciver-Brunt was a member of the winning team at the 2017 World Cup held in England. In 2018 she was named one of the five Wisden Cricketers of the Year for her part in the World Cup victory the previous summer.

In October 2018, she was named in England's squad for the 2018 ICC Women's World Twenty20 tournament in the West Indies. Following the conclusion of the tournament, she was named as the standout player in the team by the International Cricket Council (ICC).

In February 2019, she was awarded a full central contract by the England and Wales Cricket Board (ECB) for 2019. In March 2019, during the third Women's Twenty20 International (WT20I) match against Sri Lanka, Sciver-Brunt scored her 1,000th run in WT20I cricket. In June 2019, the ECB named her in England's squad for their opening match against Australia to contest the Women's Ashes. In January 2020, she was named in England's squad for the 2020 ICC Women's T20 World Cup in Australia.

On 18 June 2020, Sciver-Brunt was named in a squad of 24 players to begin training ahead of international women's fixtures starting in England following the COVID-19 pandemic. In June 2021, Sciver-Brunt was named in England's Test and WODI squad as the vice-captain for their home series against India. In the second match of the WODI series, she took the wicket of Shikha Pandey and claimed her 50th wicket in WODIs.

In December 2021, Sciver-Brunt was named in England's squad for their tour to Australia to contest the Women's Ashes. In February 2022, she was named in England's team for the 2022 Women's Cricket World Cup in New Zealand. In April 2022, she was bought by the Trent Rockets for the 2022 season of The Hundred.

In July 2022, she was named as the vice-captain of England's team for the cricket tournament at the 2022 Commonwealth Games in Birmingham, England. At the end of the 2022 season, Sciver-Brunt was named the PCA Women's Player of the Year, for her two centuries during the 2022 World Cup, her maiden Test century against South Africa, and her performances during The Hundred.

She was named in the England squad for the 2024 ICC Women's T20 World Cup for their multi-format tour to South Africa in November 2024. Against South Africa, on 15 December 2024, Sciver-Brunt scored the fastest century in a women's Test match in terms of balls faced, when she brought up the landmark off her 96th delivery, going on to make 128 before being run out backing up at the non-striker's end.

Sciver-Brunt was named in the England squad for the 2025 Women's Ashes series in Australia.

Sciver-Brunt was named to England women's 2026 Women's T20 World Cup squad. During the second group stage match against Ireland, Sciver-Brunt strained her left calf, and this recurrence forced her to miss the rest of the group stage. However, she recovered strongly, and made it back in time for the semi-final vs South Africa, where she hit a match winning 75 off 47 balls in a 133 run partnership with Heather Knight.

== One Day International centuries ==
Nat Sciver-Brunt's One-Day International centuries
#	Runs	Match	Opponents	Venue	Year
1	137	34	Pakistan	Grace Road, Leicester, England	2017
2	129	38	New Zealand	County Ground, Derby, England	2017
3	100*	66	Pakistan	Kinrara Academy Oval, Kuala Lumpur, Malaysia	2019
4	109*	81	Australia	Seddon Park, Hamilton, New Zealand	2022
5	148*	89	Australia	Hagley Oval, Christchurch, New Zealand	2022
6	111*	96	Australia	Rose Bowl, Southampton, England	2023
7	129	97	Australia	County Ground, Taunton, England	2023
8	120	100	Sri Lanka	Grace Road, Leicester, England	2023
9	124*	106	Pakistan	County Ground, Chelmsford, England	2024
10	117	124	Sri Lanka	R. Premadasa Stadium, Colombo, Sri Lanka	2025

== Personal life ==
In October 2019, Sciver-Brunt announced her engagement to fellow England cricketer Katherine Brunt. They were scheduled to get married in September 2020, but their wedding was postponed due to the COVID-19 pandemic. The pair married in May 2022. Both changed their last name to Sciver-Brunt when they married, and in January 2023 it was announced that the pair would both use the name in all cricket-related instances. On 20 September 2024, the couple announced Katherine was pregnant with their first child. Their son was born in March 2025.

== Honours ==
=== Team ===
- Women's Cricket World Cup champion: 2017
- Women's Premier League champion: 2023
- Women's Premier League champion: 2025

=== Individual ===
- 3x Walter Lawrence Women's Award winner: 2014, 2018, 2022
- PCA Women's Player of the Year: 2017, 2022
- One of the five Wisden Cricketers of the Year: 2018
- First Player to score 500+ runs in a single season of Women's Premier League: 523 Runs For Mumbai Indians in 2025

== See also ==
- List of centuries in women's One Day International cricket
