= Sidra Ameen =

Pakistani cricketer (born 1992)

Personal information
- Full name: Sidra Ameen
- Born: 7 April 1992 (age 34); Lahore, Pakistan
- Batting: Right-handed
- Bowling: Right-arm medium-fast
- Role: Batter

International information
- National side: Pakistan (2011–present)
- ODI debut (cap 61): 26 April 2011 v Sri Lanka
- Last ODI: 8 October 2025 v Australia
- T20I debut (cap 24): 24 April 2011 v Ireland
- Last T20I: 8 August 2025 v Ireland
- T20I shirt no.: 31

Domestic team information
- Years: Team
- 2009/10–2010/11: Lahore
- 2011/12–2014: Higher Education Commission
- 2012/13: Punjab
- 2014: Lahore
- 2015: Omar Associates
- 2015/16–2018/19: State Bank of Pakistan

Career statistics
Competition	WODI	WT20I	WLA	WT20
Matches	80	66	155	134
Runs scored	2,391	1,044	5,154	2,770
Batting average	33.20	18.00	40.58	24.95
100s/50s	6/13	0/4	11/29	1/15
Top score	176*	63	178	113*
Catches/stumpings	21/–	24/–	57/–	52/–
- Source: CricketArchive, 9 October 2025

Sidra Ameen (born 7 April 1992) is a Pakistani cricketer who plays for the Pakistan women's national team as a right-handed batter. In June 2022, she crossed 1,000 runs in her ODI career, becoming the 7th Pakistani women batter to go past that milestone. She has also played domestic cricket for Lahore, Higher Education Commission, Punjab, Omar Associates and State Bank of Pakistan.

== International career ==
She played four matches for Pakistan at the 2013 World Cup. In October 2018, she was named in Pakistan's squad for the 2018 ICC Women's World Twenty20 tournament in the West Indies. However, prior to the tournament she was replaced by Bismah Maroof. In October 2021, she was named in Pakistan's team for the 2021 Women's Cricket World Cup Qualifier tournament in Zimbabwe.

In January 2022, she was named in Pakistan's team for the 2022 Women's Cricket World Cup in New Zealand. On 14 March 2022, in Pakistan's World Cup match against Bangladesh, Sidra scored 104 runs, her first century in WODI cricket.

On 3 June 2022, she scored the second century (123 runs) of her career against Sri Lanka in the 2nd ODI of their series. In the following match, she surpassed 1,000 runs in her ODI career.

She was in the Pakistan squad for the 2024 ICC Women's T20 World Cup.

Ameen was part of the Pakistan squad for the 2025 Women's Cricket World Cup Qualifier at home in April 2025.

In September 2025, Ameen scored her fifth ODI hundred with an unbeaten 121 off 150 balls at Gaddafi Stadium, during the first ODI of the home series against South Africa. During the match, she also became the third Pakistani woman to complete 2,000 runs in ODI cricket. During the second ODI against South Africa at the same venue, she scored 122 off 110 balls to register her sixth ODI hundred.
