= 2020–21 CSA Women's Provincial Programme =

South African women's domestic cricket season

- Dates: 23 February – 24 April 2021
- Administrator(s): Cricket South Africa
- Cricket format: 50 over
- Tournament format(s): Round robin
- Champions: No overall winner
- Participants: 16
- Matches: 34
- Most runs: Susan Benade (311)
- Most wickets: Ricea Coetzer (12); Haroline Rhodes (12)

The 2020–21 CSA Women's Provincial Programme was the 26th edition of South Africa's provincial one-day cricket tournament. The tournament was initially scheduled to begin in January 2021, but was delayed due to the COVID-19 pandemic, and the format was changed. The tournament began in February 2021 and ran until April 2021, with teams competing in four groups, each located in a different city under COVID-19 protocols. Due to this, there was no overall winner.

== Competition format ==
The 16 teams were divided into two tiers of two groups apiece. The top tier consisted of six teams, divided into Pool A and Pool B. Each team played each other team twice, therefore playing four matches overall. The second tier consisted of ten teams, divided into Pool C and Pool D. Each team played each other once, therefore playing four matches overall. Matches were played using a one day format, with 50 overs per side.

The winners of Pools C and D played-off for promotion to the top tier, whilst the bottom-placed teams in Pools A and B played-off, with the loser being relegated to the bottom tier.

The groups worked on a points system with positions being based on the total points. Points were awarded as follows:

Win: 4 points
Tie: 3 points
Loss: 0 points.
Abandoned/No Result: 2 points.

== Teams ==
Pool A	Central Gauteng	Northerns	Western Province		
Pool B	Border	KwaZulu-Natal Coastal	North West		
Pool C	Boland	Eastern Province	Free State	Kei	South Western Districts
Pool D	Easterns	KwaZulu-Natal Inland	Limpopo	Mpumalanga	Northern Cape

== Tables ==
=== Top 6 ===
==== Pool A ====
Team	Pld	W	L	T	NR	A	Pts	NRR
Western Province	4	4	0	0	0	0	16	+1.180
Central Gauteng	4	2	2	0	0	0	8	–0.147
Northerns	4	0	4	0	0	0	0	–1.005

==== Pool B ====
Team	Pld	W	L	T	NR	A	Pts	NRR
KwaZulu-Natal Coastal	4	3	1	0	0	0	12	+0.889
North West	4	3	1	0	0	0	12	+0.884
Border	4	0	4	0	0	0	0	–1.702

=== Second Tier ===
==== Pool C ====
Team	Pld	W	L	T	NR	A	Pts	NRR
South Western Districts	4	4	0	0	0	0	16	+2.102
Free State	4	3	1	0	0	0	12	+1.323
Eastern Province	4	2	2	0	0	0	8	+0.584
Boland	4	1	3	0	0	0	4	–0.408
Kei	4	0	4	0	0	0	0	–4.322

==== Pool D ====
Team	Pld	W	L	T	NR	A	Pts	NRR
Easterns	4	4	0	0	0	0	16	+1.530
Northern Cape	4	3	1	0	0	0	12	+1.258
KwaZulu-Natal Inland	4	2	2	0	0	0	8	–0.308
Limpopo	4	1	3	0	0	0	4	–0.609
Mpumalanga	4	0	4	0	0	0	0	–1.321

== Play-offs ==
=== Relegation ===
24 April 2021
Scorecard

Northerns; 236 (46.5 overs)	v	Border; 94 (38.3 overs)
Suné Luus 73 (92); Khayakazi Mathe 4/38 (10 overs)		Siyamanga Mhletywa 40 (56); Suné Luus 3/35 (10 overs)

Northerns won by 142 runs
Wanderers Club, Johannesburg
Umpires: Roger Burne and Roderick Ellis

- Border won the toss and elected to field.
- Border were relegated to the bottom tier of the tournament.

=== Promotion ===
24 April 2021
Scorecard

Easterns; 149 (44.5 overs)	v	South Western Districts; 70 (22.5 overs)
Madison Landsman 48 (95); Micaela Andrews 3/16 (8 overs)		Jane Winster 24* (58); Tsholofelo Marema 3/15 (5 overs)

Easterns won by 79 runs
Wanderers Club, Johannesburg
Umpires: K Ntuli and G Tatjaarel

- South Western Districts won the toss and elected to field.
- Easterns were promoted to the top tier of the tournament.
