= Karabo Meso =

South African cricketer (born 2007)

Personal information
- Born: 18 September 2007 (age 19)
- Batting: Right-handed
- Role: Wicket-keeper batter

International information
- National side: South Africa
- ODI debut (cap 93): 29 April 2025 v India
- Last ODI: 2 November 2025 v India
- ODI shirt no.: 72
- T20I debut (cap 62): 30 March 2024 v Sri Lanka
- Last T20I: 3 April 2024 v Sri Lanka
- T20I shirt no.: 72

Domestic team information
- Years: Team
- 2020–present: Central Gauteng

Career statistics
Competition	T20I	WLA	WT20
Matches	2	20	13
Runs scored	0	243	149
Batting average	–	13.50	21.28
100s/50s	0/0	0/2	0/0
Top score	0*	61	47*
Balls bowled	–	44	24
Wickets	–	1	1
Bowling average	–	38.00	24.00
5 wickets in innings	0	0	0
10 wickets in match	0	0	0
Best bowling	–	1/38	1/24
Catches/stumpings	1/0	7/1	11/2
Medal record
Women's cricket
Representing South Africa
ICC Cricket World Cup
Runner-up	2025 India
African Games
Silver medal – second place	2023 Accra
- Source: CricketArchive, 19 April 2024

Karabo Meso (born 18 September 2007) is a South African cricketer who currently plays for Central Gauteng and South Africa. She plays as a right-hand batter and wicket-keeper. Meso attended Steyn City School in Johannesburg and Rockport School in County Down, Northern Ireland, where she was in receipt of a Cricket Scholarship.

== Domestic career ==
Meso made her List A debut for Central Gauteng on 21 March 2021, against Western Province in 2020–21 CSA Women's Provincial Programme. She made her Twenty20 debut against North West women's cricket team on 27 March 2022 in the 2021–22 CSA Women's Provincial T20 Competition.

== International career ==
In December 2022, Meso was selected in the South Africa Under-19 squad for the 2023 ICC Under-19 Women's T20 World Cup. She played five matches at the tournament, scored 80 runs at an average of 26.66. She scored unbeaten 32 run against Bangladesh women's under-19 team.

In March 2024, she named in South Africa Emerging team for the 2023 African Games. She was recorded 5 dismissals in that tournament, which was most by any wicketkeeper.

In March 2024, she was earned her maiden call-up for national team in T20I squad for their series against Sri Lanka. She made her Women's Twenty20 International (T20I) debut against Sri Lanka on 30 March 2024. In April 2024, she named in ODI squad for their series against Sri Lanka.

In December 2024, she was named in South Africa under-19 squad for the 2025 Under-19 Women's T20 World Cup.

In April 2025, she was earned maiden call-up for the ODI squad for the Tri-Nation Series against Sri Lanka and India.
