= Lauren Agenbag =

South African cricket umpire (born 1996)

Personal information
- Born: 16 August 1996 (age 30); Centurion, South Africa
- Role: Umpire

Umpiring information
- T20Is umpired: 11 (2022–2023)
- WTests umpired: 1 (2024)
- WODIs umpired: 34 (2021–2026)
- WT20Is umpired: 87 (2019–2026)
- Source: Cricinfo, 24 December 2023

Lauren Agenbag (born 16 August 1996) is a South African cricket umpire. Since February 2019, she has set several firsts in regard to women's umpiring in international and domestic cricket matches.

== Career ==
On 1 February 2019, Agenbag stood in the opening Women's Twenty20 International (WT20I) match between South Africa and Sri Lanka, at Newlands Cricket Ground in Cape Town. In doing so, she became the first South African woman to umpire a T20I match. The International Cricket Council (ICC) does not have official records, but at the age of 22 years, she is also believed to be the youngest person to umpire in an international cricket fixture, since George Coulthard did so in Australia in January 1879, also at age 22.

Cricket South Africa's Chief Executive, Thabang Moroe, praised Agenbag, saying "this is a very significant moment for umpiring in South Africa". Dane van Niekerk, captain of South Africa's women's team also praised Agenbag, saying "she held her own and it's awesome to a see a woman out there doing really well".

In May 2019, she was one of the on-field umpires for the final of the 2019 ICC Women's Qualifier Africa tournament, between Zimbabwe and Namibia. The same month, the ICC named her as one of the eight women on the ICC Development Panel of Umpires. She was one of the umpires during the 2019 ICC Women's World Twenty20 Qualifier tournament in Scotland.

In September 2019, Cricket South Africa appointed her to their Reserve List Umpires Panel for the 2019–20 cricket season. On 13 September 2019, Agenbag became the first woman to umpire in a senior men's provincial match, when she was one of the on-field umpires in the match between Eastern Province and KwaZulu-Natal Inland in the 2019–20 CSA Provincial T20 Cup. On 17 October 2019, in the match between Gauteng and Boland in the 2019–20 CSA 3-Day Provincial Cup, Agenbag became the first woman to stand as an on-field umpire in a first-class cricket match in South Africa.

In February 2020, the ICC named her as one of the umpires to officiate in matches during the 2020 ICC Women's T20 World Cup in Australia. In January 2021, Agenbag umpired in her first Women's One Day International (WODI) matches, in all three fixtures between South Africa and Pakistan at the Kingsmead Cricket Ground. In February 2022, she was named as one of the on-field umpires for the 2022 Women's Cricket World Cup in New Zealand. On 1 April 2022, the ICC named Agenbag as one of the on-field umpires for the final of the tournament, and became the youngest umpire to officiate in a Cricket World Cup final.

In June 2023, she became the first female umpire to appoint to Elite Umpires Panel by Cricket South Africa.

In September 2024 she was named as part of an all-female officiating group for the 2024 ICC Women's T20 World Cup.
