= Sri Lanka women's cricket team in the West Indies in 2012 =

	West Indies	Sri Lanka
- Dates: 25 April – 9 May 2012
Captains	Merissa Aguilleira	Dilani Manodara

One Day International series
- Results: West Indies won the 3-match series 2–1
Most runs	Shanel Daley (150)	Shashikala Siriwardene (102)
Most wickets	Anisa Mohammed (7)	Shashikala Siriwardene (8)
- Player of the series: Shanel Daley (WI)

Twenty20 International series
- Results: West Indies won the 5-match series 3–1
Most runs	Stafanie Taylor (110)	Deepika Rasangika (82)
Most wickets	Stafanie Taylor (7)	Chamani Seneviratna (9)
- Player of the series: Stafanie Taylor (WI)

The Sri Lanka women's national cricket team toured the West Indies in April and May 2012. They played three One Day Internationals and five Twenty20 Internationals against the West Indies, losing the ODI series 2–1 and losing the T20I series 3–1.

== Squads ==
West Indies	Sri Lanka
Merissa Aguilleira (c) (wk); Shemaine Campbelle; Shanel Daley; Deandra Dottin; Pearl Etienne; Stacy-Ann King; Natasha McLean; Anisa Mohammed; Subrina Munroe; Juliana Nero; Amanda Samaroo; Shakera Selman; Tremayne Smartt; Stafanie Taylor	Dilani Manodara (c) (wk); Chamari Atapattu; Dharshani Dharmasiri; Sandamali Dolawatte; Inoka Galagedara; Chandima Gunaratne; Yasoda Mendis; Inoka Ranaweera; Deepika Rasangika; Chamani Seneviratna; Dilhani Siriwardene; Shashikala Siriwardene; Prasadani Weerakkody; Sripali Weerakkody

== WODI Series ==
=== 1st ODI ===
25 April 2012
Scorecard

West Indies; 228/6 (50 overs)	v	Sri Lanka; 140 (42.3 overs)
Shanel Daley 63 (97); Maduri Samuddika 2/39 (10 overs)		Dilani Manodara 37 (95); Anisa Mohammed 5/34 (9.3 overs)

West Indies Women won by 88 runs
Kensington Oval, Bridgetown
Umpires: Gregory Brathwaite (WI) and Vincent Bullen (WI)
Player of the match: Shanel Daley (WI)

- West Indies Women won the toss and elected to bat.
- Inoka Ranaweera (SL) made her WODI debut.

=== 2nd ODI ===
27 April 2012
Scorecard

West Indies; 197/9 (50 overs)	v	Sri Lanka; 200/9 (49.4 overs)
Shemaine Campbelle 56 (67); Shashikala Siriwardene 3/27 (10 overs)		Yasoda Mendis 51 (93); Anisa Mohammed 2/29 (10 overs)

Sri Lanka Women won by 1 wicket
Windward Park, Lucas Street, Barbados
Umpires: Gregory Brathwaite (WI) and Vincent Bullen (WI)
Player of the match: Chamani Seneviratna (SL)

- Sri Lanka Women won the toss and elected to field.
- Natasha McLean (WI) made her WODI debut.

=== 3rd ODI ===
29 April 2012
Scorecard

West Indies; 168/7 (40 overs)	v	Sri Lanka; 131 (38.4 overs)
Shanel Daley 63 (105); Shashikala Siriwardene 4/40 (8 overs)		Shashikala Siriwardene 34 (55); Subrina Munroe 3/15 (7 overs)

West Indies Women won by 45 runs (D/L)
Windward Park, Lucas Street, Barbados
Umpires: Gregory Brathwaite (WI) and Vincent Bullen (WI)
Player of the match: Shanel Daley (WI)

- Sri Lanka Women won the toss and elected to field.
- Match reduced to 40 overs per side due to rain.
- Sri Lanka Women revised target was 177 from 40 overs.
- Chandima Gunaratne (SL) made her WODI debut.

== WT20I Series ==
=== 1st T20I ===
1 May 2012
Scorecard

West Indies; 127/7 (20 overs)	v	Sri Lanka; 104/8 (20 overs)
Shanel Daley 48 (28); Shashikala Siriwardene 2/24 (4 overs)		Shashikala Siriwardene 33* (24); Stafanie Taylor 2/19 (3 overs)

West Indies Women won by 23 runs
Kensington Oval, Bridgetown
Umpires: Gregory Brathwaite (WI) and Joel Wilson (WI)
Player of the match: Shanel Daley (WI)

- West Indies Women won the toss and elected to bat.
- Dharshani Dharmasiri, Chandima Gunaratne and Prasadani Weerakkody (SL) all made their WT20I debuts.

=== 2nd T20I ===
2 May 2012
Scorecard

West Indies; 129/4 (20 overs)	v	Sri Lanka; 122/9 (20 overs)
Stafanie Taylor 62 (49); Chandima Gunaratne 2/20 (4 overs)		Deepika Rasangika 39 (42); Stafanie Taylor 3/23 (4 overs)

West Indies Women won by 7 runs
Kensington Oval, Bridgetown
Umpires: Joel Wilson (WI) and Vincent Bullen (WI)
Player of the match: Stafanie Taylor (WI)

- West Indies Women won the toss and elected to bat.

=== 3rd T20I ===
6 May 2012
Scorecard

Sri Lanka; 77/8 (16 overs)	v	West Indies; 80/7 (15.1 overs)
Deepika Rasangika 22* (25); Subrina Munroe 2/12 (3 overs)		Shemaine Campbelle 27* (23); Sripali Weerakkody 3/23 (4 overs)

West Indies Women won by 3 wickets
Queen's Park Oval, Port of Spain
Umpires: Joel Wilson (WI) and Peter Nero (WI)
Player of the match: Shemaine Campbelle (WI)

- Sri Lanka Women won the toss and elected to bat.
- Match reduced to 16 overs per side.

=== 4th T20I ===
7 May 2012
Scorecard

Sri Lanka; 94/7 (20 overs)	v	West Indies; 80/9 (20 overs)
Yasoda Mendis 21 (31); Shemaine Campbelle 2/15 (4 overs)		Juliana Nero 32 (42); Maduri Samuddika 3/11 (4 overs)

Sri Lanka Women won by 14 runs
Queen's Park Oval, Port of Spain
Umpires: Joel Wilson (WI) and Peter Nero (WI)
Player of the match: Maduri Samuddika (SL)

- Sri Lanka Women won the toss and elected to bat.

=== 5th T20I ===
9 May 2012
Scorecard

West Indies; 92/5 (18.2 overs)	v	Sri Lanka
Deandra Dottin 52* (36); Chamani Seneviratna 3/18 (4 overs)

No result
Queen's Park Oval, Port of Spain
Umpires: Joel Wilson (WI) and Peter Nero (WI)

- West Indies Women won the toss and elected to bat.
- No further play possible due to rain.
- Natasha McLean (WI) made her WT20I debut.
