= Sri Lanka women's cricket team in South Africa in 2013–14 =

	South Africa	Sri Lanka
- Dates: 22 October – 4 November 2013
Captains	Mignon du Preez	Shashikala Siriwardene

One Day International series
- Results: South Africa won the 3-match series 2–0
Most runs	Marizanne Kapp (116)	Chamari Atapattu (97)
Most wickets	Shabnim Ismail (7)	Shashikala Siriwardene (3)
- Player of the series: Marizanne Kapp (SA)

Twenty20 International series
- Results: South Africa won the 3-match series 2–1
Most runs	Trisha Chetty (69)	Lasanthi Madushani (93)
Most wickets	Marizanne Kapp (7)	Shashikala Siriwardene (7)
- Player of the series: Mignon du Preez (SA)

The Sri Lanka women's national cricket team toured South Africa in October and November 2013. They played South Africa in three One Day Internationals and three Twenty20 Internationals, losing both the ODI (2–0) and the T20I series (2–1).

== Squads ==
South Africa	Sri Lanka
Mignon du Preez (c); Trisha Chetty (wk); Moseline Daniels; Shabnim Ismail; Marizanne Kapp; Alexis le Breton; Lizelle Lee; Marcia Letsoalo; Sunette Loubser; Suné Luus; Nadine Moodley; Yolandi Potgieter; Chloe Tryon; Dane van Niekerk	Shashikala Siriwardene (c); Chamari Atapattu; Chandima Gunaratne; Nobet Ida; Eshani Lokusuriyage; Niluka Karunaratne; Lasanthi Madushani; Dilani Manodara (wk); Yasoda Mendis; Udeshika Prabodhani; Deepika Rasangika (withdrawn); Maduri Samuddika; Chamani Seneviratna; Rebeca Vandort (wk); Sripali Weerakkody

== Tour Match: South Africa Emerging Players v Sri Lanka ==
22 October 2013
Scorecard

Sri Lanka; 241/8 (50 overs)	v	South Africa Emerging Players; 107 (28.3 overs)
Shashikala Siriwardene 47 (54); Zizipo Mdebuka 3/22 (3 overs)		Robyn Searle 35 (68); Nobet Ida 2/14 (4 overs)

Sri Lanka Women won by 134 runs
Absa Puk Oval, Potchefstroom
Umpires: Phillip Vosloo (SA) and Roderick Ellis (SA)

- South Africa Emerging Players won the toss and elected to field.

== WODI Series ==
=== 1st ODI ===
24 October 2013
Scorecard

Sri Lanka; 136 (41.1 overs)	v	South Africa; 139/3 (37.2 overs)
Chamari Atapattu 36 (52); Dane van Niekerk 3/25 (10 overs)		Trisha Chetty 53 (93); Shashikala Siriwardene 1/14 (5 overs)

South Africa Women won by 7 wickets
Senwes Park, Potchefstroom
Umpires: Phillip Vosloo (SA) and Roderick Ellis (SA)
Player of the match: Trisha Chetty (SA)

- South Africa Women won the toss and elected to field.
- Nobet Ida (SL) made her WODI debut.

=== 2nd ODI ===
26 October 2013
Scorecard

South Africa; 274/3 (50 overs)	v	Sri Lanka; 207/8 (50 overs)
Mignon du Preez 79* (87); Shashikala Siriwardene 2/42 (10 overs)		Shashikala Siriwardene 68 (96); Shabnim Ismail 3/34 (10 overs)

South Africa Women won by 67 runs
Senwes Park, Potchefstroom
Umpires: Phillip Vosloo (SA) and Rudi Birkenstock (SA)
Player of the match: Mignon du Preez (SA)

- South Africa Women won the toss and elected to field.
- Niluka Karunaratne (SL) made her WODI debut.

=== 3rd ODI ===
28 October 2013
Scorecard

Sri Lanka; 164 (50 overs)	v	South Africa; 2/0 (1 over)
Chamari Atapattu 58 (87); Marizanne Kapp 3/38 (10 overs)		Trisha Chetty 1* (1)

No result
Senwes Park, Potchefstroom
Umpires: Phillip Vosloo (SA) and Rudi Birkenstock (SA)

- South Africa Women won the toss and elected to field.
- No further play possible due to rain.
- Nadine Moodley (SA) and Rebeca Vandort (SL) both made their WODI debuts.

== WT20I Series ==
=== 1st T20I ===
31 October 2013
Scorecard

Sri Lanka; 119/4 (20 overs)	v	South Africa; 123/3 (19.3 overs)
Lasanthi Madushani 63* (62); Dane van Niekerk 1/11 (2 overs)		Trisha Chetty 51* (54); Shashikala Siriwardene 1/14 (4 overs)

South Africa won by 7 wickets
Senwes Park, Potchefstroom
Umpires: Phillip Vosloo (SA) and Rudi Birkenstock (SA)
Player of the match: Lasanthi Madushani (SL)

- South Africa Women won the toss and elected to field.
- Niluka Karunaratne (SL) made her WT20I debut.

=== 2nd T20I ===
2 November 2013
Scorecard

Sri Lanka; 138/5 (20 overs)	v	South Africa; 118/8 (20 overs)
Chamari Atapattu 39 (23); Marizanne Kapp 3/18 (4 overs)		Dane van Niekerk 26 (27); Shashikala Siriwardene 2/16 (4 overs)

Sri Lanka Women won by 20 runs
Senwes Park, Potchefstroom
Umpires: Phillip Vosloo (SA) and Roderick Ellis (SA)
Player of the match: Shashikala Siriwardene (SL)

- South Africa Women won the toss and elected to field.
- Rebeca Vandort (SL) made her WT20I debut.

=== 3rd T20I ===
4 November 2013
Scorecard

Sri Lanka; 109/6 (20 overs)	v	South Africa; 111/5 (18.2 overs)
Eshani Lokusuriyage 50 (34); Marizanne Kapp 1/13 (3 overs)		Mignon du Preez 43* (41); Shashikala Siriwardene 4/21 (4 overs)

South Africa Women won by 5 wickets
Senwes Park, Potchefstroom
Umpires: Roderick Ellis (SA) and Rudi Birkenstock (SA)
Player of the match: Sunette Loubser (SA)

- South Africa Women won the toss and elected to field.
