= West Indies women's cricket team in Sri Lanka in 2008–09 =

	Sri Lanka	West Indies
- Dates: 3 – 12 November 2008
Captains	Shashikala Siriwardene	Nadine George

One Day International series
- Results: Sri Lanka won the 5-match series 3–2
Most runs	Dedunu Silva (162)	Stacy-Ann King (124)
Most wickets	Suwini de Alwis (11)	Anisa Mohammed (7); Stafanie Taylor (7)
- Player of the series: Shashikala Siriwardene (SL)

The West Indies women's cricket team toured Sri Lanka in November 2008. They played against Sri Lanka in 5 One Day Internationals, losing the series 3–2. The tour was originally planned to be a tour of both Sri Lanka and Pakistan, but the side cancelled the Pakistan leg of the tour due to security concerns.

== Squads ==
Sri Lanka	West Indies
Shashikala Siriwardene (c); Chamika Bandara; Suwini de Alwis; Hiruka Fernando; Rose Fernando; Inoka Galagedara; Eshani Lokusuriyage; Dilani Manodara (wk); Chamari Polgampola; Udeshika Prabodhani; Chamani Seneviratna; Dedunu Silva; Sripali Weerakkody; Chandi Wickramasinghe	Nadine George (c) (wk); Merissa Aguilleira (wk); Kirbyina Alexander; Phernel Charles; Shanel Daley; Deandra Dottin; Afy Fletcher; Erva Giddings; Stacy-Ann King; Anisa Mohammed; Juliana Nero; Danielle Small; Charlene Taitt; Stafanie Taylor

== Tour Match: Sri Lanka XI v West Indies ==
3 November 2008
Scorecard

West Indies; 273/3 (50 overs)	v	Sri Lanka XI; 161/7 (50 overs)
Deandra Dottin 103 (68); Sanduni Abeywickrama 1/24 (10 overs)		Hiruka Fernando 34 (43); Afy Fletcher 2/13 (5 overs)

West Indies Women won by 112 runs
Paikiasothy Saravanamuttu Stadium, Colombo
Umpires: A Jayarasuriya (SL) and Kitsiri Jayaweera (SL)

- Sri Lanka Women XI won the toss and elected to field.

== WODI Series ==
=== 1st ODI ===
5 November 2008
Scorecard

West Indies; 167 (49.5 overs)	v	Sri Lanka; 127 (42.4 overs)
Stacy-Ann King 70 (100); Sripali Weerakkody 3/26 (10 overs)		Chamari Polgampola 29 (70); Stafanie Taylor 3/10 (8 overs)

West Indies Women won by 40 runs
Rangiri Dambulla International Stadium, Dambulla
Umpires: Lyndon Hannibal (SL) and Prageeth Rambukwella (SL)
Player of the match: Stacy-Ann King (WI)

- Sri Lanka Women won the toss and elected to field.
- Chamika Bandara, Chandi Wickramasinghe (SL) and Shanel Daley (WI) all made their WODI debuts.

=== 2nd ODI ===
7 November 2008
Scorecard

West Indies; 169/9 (50 overs)	v	Sri Lanka; 170/8 (49.2 overs)
Stafanie Taylor 33 (39); Suwini de Alwis 2/20 (7 overs)		Shashikala Siriwardene 43 (69); Afy Fletcher 2/30 (8 overs)

Sri Lanka Women won by 2 wickets
Rangiri Dambulla International Stadium, Dambulla
Umpires: Dushantha Ekanayake (SL) and Krishantha Rodrigo (SL)
Player of the match: Shashikala Siriwardene (SL)

- Sri Lanka Women won the toss and elected to field.

=== 3rd ODI ===
9 November 2008
Scorecard

West Indies; 125 (44.3 overs)	v	Sri Lanka; 127/2 (36.3 overs)
Danielle Small 37* (72); Rose Fernando 3/22 (10 overs)		Dedunu Silva 58 (94); Stafanie Taylor 1/22 (10 overs)

Sri Lanka Women won by 8 wickets
Rangiri Dambulla International Stadium, Dambulla
Umpires: Pradeep Udawatta (SL) and Raveendra Wimalasiri (SL)
Player of the match: Dedunu Silva (SL)

- West Indies Women won the toss and elected to bat.

=== 4th ODI ===
11 November 2008
Scorecard

West Indies; 170 (49.2 overs)	v	Sri Lanka; 157 (46.2 overs)
Stacy-Ann King 39 (43); Chamari Polgampola 3/23 (10 overs)		Shashikala Siriwardene 46 (63); Kirbyina Alexander 2/15 (3 overs)

West Indies Women won by 13 runs
R. Premadasa Stadium, Colombo
Umpires: Nishan Dhanasinghe (SL) and Philip Mendis (SL)
Player of the match: Stacy-Ann King (WI)

- Sri Lanka Women won the toss and elected to field.

=== 5th ODI ===
12 November 2008
Scorecard

West Indies; 120 (44.4 overs)	v	Sri Lanka; 121/3 (37.1 overs)
Deandra Dottin 31 (63); Suwini de Alwis 4/25 (9.4 overs)		Shashikala Siriwardene 32 (60); Anisa Mohammed 2/14 (10 overs)

Sri Lanka Women won by 7 wickets
R. Premadasa Stadium, Colombo
Umpires: Chamley Fernando (SL) and Ravindra Kottahachchi (SL)
Player of the match: Suwini de Alwis (SL)

- Sri Lanka Women won the toss and elected to field.
