= 2011 NatWest Women's Quadrangular Series =

- Dates: 30 June – 7 July 2011
- Administrator: England and Wales Cricket Board
- Cricket format: ODI (50 overs)
- Host: England
- Champions: England
- Runners-up: Australia
- Participants: 4
- Matches: 8
- Player of the series: Jess Duffin (Aus)
- Most runs: Lydia Greenway (Eng) (177)
- Most wickets: Sarah Coyte (Aus) (12)

The NatWest Women's Quadrangular Series was a Women's One Day International series which took place in England in 2011. The top four ranked teams in the world competed: Australia, England, India and New Zealand. The tournament consisted of a round-robin group stage, in which Australia and England finished as the top two, and then a third-place play-off and a final were contested to decide the final positions. England defeated Australia by 34 runs in the final. The tournament followed a Twenty20 Quadrangular Series, with the same teams competing.

== Squads ==
| Australia | England | India | New Zealand |
|---|---|---|---|
| Jodie Fields (c) (wk); Alex Blackwell; Jess Duffin; Sarah Coyte; Rachael Haynes; Jess Jonassen; Meg Lanning; Annie Maloney; Sharon Millanta; Shelley Nitschke; Erin Osborne; Leah Poulton; Clea Smith; Lisa Sthalekar | Charlotte Edwards (c); Arran Brindle; Katherine Brunt; Holly Colvin; Jenny Gunn (withdrawn); Danielle Hazell; Heather Knight; Lydia Greenway; Laura Marsh; Anya Shrubsole (withdrawn); Claire Taylor; Sarah Taylor (wk); Fran Wilson; Danielle Wyatt | Jhulan Goswami (c); Ekta Bisht; Diana David; Anagha Deshpande; Shilpa Gupta; Harmanpreet Kaur; Veda Krishnamurthy; Samantha Lobatto (wk); Snehal Pradhan; Mithali Raj; Poonam Raut; Priyanka Roy; Amita Sharma; Gouher Sultana; Neha Tanwar | Aimee Watkins (c); Kelly Anderson; Suzie Bates; Janet Brehaut; Nicola Browne; Lucy Doolan; Frances Mackay; Katey Martin (wk); Sara McGlashan; Liz Perry; Rachel Priest (wk); Sian Ruck; Amy Satterthwaite; Lea Tahuhu (withdrawn) |

== Points table ==
Note: P = Played, W = Wins, L = Losses, BP = Bonus Points, Pts = Points, NRR = Net run rate.

| Pos | Team | P | W | L | BP | Pts | NRR |
|---|---|---|---|---|---|---|---|
| 1 | Australia | 3 | 3 | 0 | 1 | 13 | +0.685 |
| 2 | England | 3 | 2 | 1 | 1 | 9 | +0.116 |
| 3 | New Zealand | 3 | 1 | 2 | 0 | 4 | −0.320 |
| 4 | India | 3 | 0 | 3 | 0 | 0 | −0.413 |

- Source:ESPNcricinfo

== Fixtures ==
=== Group stage ===
30 June 2011
Scorecard

| Australia; 261/9 (50 overs) | v | New Zealand; 232 (47.5 overs) |
| Jess Duffin 79 (80); Nicola Browne 2/19 (10 overs) | | Sara McGlashan 65 (84); Shelley Nitschke 3/35 (9 overs) |

Australia Women won by 29 runs
Queen's Park, Chesterfield
Umpires: Ismail Dawood (Eng) and Trevor Jesty (Eng)
Player of the match: Jess Duffin (Aus)

- Australia Women won the toss and elected to bat.
- Points: Australia Women 4, New Zealand Women 0

30 June 2011
Scorecard

| India; 202/9 (50 overs) | v | England; 204/4 (45.2 overs) |
| Punam Raut 52 (117); Katherine Brunt 2/36 (10 overs) | | Lydia Greenway 51* (65); Jhulan Goswami 1/28 (7.2 overs) |

England Women won by 6 wickets
County Ground, Derby
Umpires: Graham Lloyd (Eng) and Jeff Evans (Eng)
Player of the match: Lydia Greenway (Eng)

- England Women won the toss and elected to field.
- Points: England Women 4, India Women 0
- Veda Krishnamurthy (Ind) made her WODI debut.

2 July 2011
Scorecard

| India; 215 (49.4 overs) | v | Australia; 216/7 (50 overs) |
| Punam Raut 60 (106); Sarah Coyte 3/38 (10 overs) | | Shelley Nitschke 78 (100); Gouher Sultana 2/30 (10 overs) |

Australia Women won by 3 wickets
Queen's Park, Chesterfield
Umpires: George Sharp (Eng) and Russell Evans (Eng)
Player of the match: Shelley Nitschke (Aus)

- India Women won the toss and elected to bat.
- Points: Australia Women 4, India Women 0
- Annie Maloney (Aus) and Ekta Bisht (Ind) both made their WODI debuts.

2 July 2011
Scorecard

| England; 237/9 (50 overs) | v | New Zealand; 179 (45.4 overs) |
| Claire Taylor 67 (98); Frances Mackay 2/26 (5 overs) | | Aimee Watkins 59 (67); Laura Marsh 3/50 (8.4 overs) |

England Women won by 58 runs
County Ground, Derby
Umpires: Martin Saggers (Eng) and Tim Robinson (Eng)
Player of the match: Claire Taylor (Eng)

- New Zealand Women won the toss and elected to field.
- Points: England Women 5, New Zealand Women 0
- Janet Brehaut (NZ) made her WODI debut.

5 July 2011
Scorecard

| England; 168 (48 overs) | v | Australia; 169/3 (35 overs) |
| Lydia Greenway 34 (46); Lisa Sthalekar 3/30 (10 overs) | | Alex Blackwell 54* (68); Danni Wyatt 1/20 (5 overs) |

Australia Women won by 7 wickets
Lord's, London
Umpires: Billy Taylor (Eng) and Nick Cook (Eng)
Player of the match: Alex Blackwell (Aus)

- England Women won the toss and elected to bat.
- Points: Australia Women 5, England Women 0

5 July 2011
Scorecard

| New Zealand; 201/8 (50 overs) | v | India; 162/9 (50 overs) |
| Lucy Doolan 76 (125); Jhulan Goswami 6/31 (10 overs) | | Harmanpreet Kaur 33 (54); Nicola Browne 2/39 (10 overs) |

New Zealand Women won by 39 runs
Walker Cricket Ground, London
Umpires: Neil Bainton (Eng) and Paul Baldwin (Eng)
Player of the match: Lucy Doolan (NZ)

- New Zealand Women won the toss and elected to bat.
- Points: New Zealand Women 4, India Women 0
- Shilpa Gupta (Ind) made her WODI debut.

=== Third-Place play-off ===
7 July 2011
Scorecard

| India; 150 (46.3 overs) | v | New Zealand; 118 (40.3 overs) |
| Punam Raut 38 (78); Kate Ebrahim 3/33 (10 overs) | | Aimee Watkins 32 (24); Ekta Bisht 3/15 (8 overs) |

India Women won by 32 runs
Butt's Way, Aston Rowant
Umpires: Alex Wharf (Eng) and Michael Gough (Eng)
Player of the match: Ekta Bisht (Ind)

- New Zealand Women won the toss and elected to field.

=== Final ===
7 July 2011
Scorecard

| England; 230/8 (50 overs) | v | Australia; 196 (47.2 overs) |
| Lydia Greenway 58 (85); Sarah Coyte 4/39 (10 overs) | | Jess Duffin 75 (77); Katherine Brunt 5/18 (10 overs) |

England Women won by 34 runs
Sir Paul Getty's Ground, Wormsley Park
Umpires: John Steele (Eng) and Peter Willey (Eng)
Player of the match: Katherine Brunt (Eng)

- Australia Women won the toss and elected to field.

== Statistics ==
=== Most runs ===
| Player | Team | Innings | Runs | Average | Strike rate | Highest Score |
|---|---|---|---|---|---|---|
| Lydia Greenway | England | 4 | 177 | 59.00 | 70.51 | 58 |
| Punam Raut | India | 4 | 176 | 44.00 | 47.95 | 60 |
| Jess Duffin | Australia | 4 | 169 | 56.33 | 97.68 | 79 |
| Shelley Nitschke | Australia | 4 | 157 | 39.25 | 64.08 | 78 |
| Alex Blackwell | Australia | 4 | 152 | 50.66 | 62.55 | 54 |
Source: ESPNcricinfo

=== Most wickets ===
| Player | Team | Overs | Wickets | Average | Economy | BBI |
|---|---|---|---|---|---|---|
| Sarah Coyte | Australia | 38.5 | 12 | 13.00 | 4.01 | 4/39 |
| Jhulan Goswami | India | 35.2 | 11 | 10.27 | 3.19 | 6/31 |
| Katherine Brunt | England | 37.0 | 8 | 13.00 | 2.81 | 5/18 |
| Shelley Nitschke | Australia | 38.4 | 8 | 19.75 | 4.08 | 3/35 |
| Lisa Sthalekar | Australia | 39.0 | 7 | 23.14 | 4.15 | 3/30 |
Source: ESPNcricinfo

== See also ==
2011 NatWest Women's T20 Quadrangular Series
