= West Indies women's cricket team in India in 2010–11 =

	India	West Indies
- Dates: 8 – 24 January 2011
Captains	Jhulan Goswami	Merissa Aguilleira

One Day International series
- Results: India won the 5-match series 3–2
Most runs	Mithali Raj (171)	Stafanie Taylor (220)
Most wickets	Gouher Sultana (7); Priyanka Roy (7); Diana David (7)	Stafanie Taylor (9)

Twenty20 International series
- Results: India won the 3-match series 2–1
Most runs	Mithali Raj (86)	Shanel Daley (64)
Most wickets	Priyanka Roy (8)	Shemaine Campbelle (4)

The West Indies women's cricket team toured India in January 2011. They played against India in five One Day Internationals and three Twenty20 Internationals, losing the ODI series 3–2 and losing the T20I series 2–1.

== Squads ==
India	West Indies
Jhulan Goswami (c); Soniya Dabir; Diana David; Anagha Deshpande (wk); Rumeli Dhar; Harmanpreet Kaur; Samantha Lobatto (wk); Reema Malhotra; Snehal Pradhan; Mithali Raj; Punam Raut; Priyanka Roy; Amita Sharma; Gouher Sultana; Neha Tanwar	Merissa Aguilleira (c) (wk); Shemaine Campbelle; Britney Cooper; Shanel Daley; Deandra Dottin; Pearl Etienne; Stacy-Ann King; Anisa Mohammed; Subrina Munroe; Juliana Nero; June Ogle; Shakera Selman; Tremayne Smartt; Stafanie Taylor

== Tour Match ==
=== 50-over match: Board President's XI v West Indies ===
8 January 2011
Scorecard

Board President's XI (India); 183/9 (50 overs)	v	West Indies; 186/5 (42 overs)
Harmanpreet Kaur 50 (98); Stafanie Taylor 3/38 (10 overs)		Stacy-Ann King 52 (79); Shubhlakshmi Sharma 2/11 (4 overs)

West Indies Women won by 5 wickets
Bandra Kurla Complex Ground, Mumbai
Umpires: Rajesh Deshpande (Ind) and Sameer Bandekar (Ind)

- Indian Board President's Women XI won the toss and elected to bat.

== WODI Series ==
=== 1st ODI ===
10 January 2011
Scorecard

India; 161 (49.3 overs)	v	West Indies; 162/1 (36.5 overs)
Punam Raut 33 (72); Anisa Mohammed 4/27 (8 overs)		Stafanie Taylor 85* (122); Jhulan Goswami 1/41 (7 overs)

West Indies Women won by 9 wickets
Bandra Kurla Complex Ground, Mumbai
Umpires: Ganesh Iyer (Ind) and Vishwas Nerurkar (Ind)

- India Women won the toss and elected to bat.

=== 2nd ODI ===
13 January 2011
Scorecard

India; 134 (41.2 overs)	v	West Indies; 124 (48 overs)
Harmanpreet Kaur 26 (59); Stafanie Taylor 2/16 (7 overs)		Anisa Mohammed 26 (69); Gouher Sultana 3/10 (10 overs)

India Women won by 10 runs
IPCL Sports Complex Ground, Vadodara
Umpires: Ravi Deshmukh (Ind) and Vishwas Nerurkar (Ind)

- West Indies Women won the toss and elected to field.
- June Ogle (WI) made her WODI debut.

=== 3rd ODI ===
15 January 2011
Scorecard

India; 156 (48.2 overs)	v	West Indies; 159/7 (49.2 overs)
Amita Sharma 35 (33); Anisa Mohammed 2/20 (10 overs)		Stafanie Taylor 46 (72); Priyanka Roy 2/27 (10 overs)

West Indies Women won by 3 wickets
IPCL Sports Complex Ground, Vadodara
Umpires: Ravi Deshmukh (Ind) and Vishwas Nerurkar (Ind)

- India Women won the toss and elected to bat.

=== 4th ODI ===
18 January 2011
Scorecard

India; 216/4 (50 overs)	v	West Indies; 206 (49.5 overs)
Mithali Raj 109* (106); Stafanie Taylor 2/32 (10 overs)		Stafanie Taylor 83 (129); Diana David 3/39 (9.5 overs)

India Women won by 10 runs
Madhavrao Scindia Cricket Ground, Rajkot
Umpires: Darabshah Doodhwala (Ind) and Piyush Khakhar (Ind)

- West Indies Women won the toss and elected to field.
- Samantha Lobatto and Neha Tanwar (Ind) both made their WODI debuts.

=== 5th ODI ===
19 January 2011
Scorecard

India; 188/9 (50 overs)	v	West Indies; 131 (45.4 overs)
Amita Sharma 47* (58); Tremayne Smartt 2/27 (8 overs)		Shanel Daley 63 (112); Priyanka Roy 3/26 (8.4 overs)

India Women won by 57 runs
Madhavrao Scindia Cricket Ground, Rajkot
Umpires: Darabshah Doodhwala (Ind) and Piyush Khakhar (Ind)

- India Women won the toss and elected to bat.

== WT20I Series ==
=== 1st T20I ===
22 January 2011
Scorecard

West Indies; 89/8 (20 overs)	v	India; 90/4 (17.2 overs)
Shanel Daley 34 (51); Jhulan Goswami 2/8 (4 overs)		Mithali Raj 27 (24); Shakera Selman 1/10 (3 overs)

India Women won by 6 wickets
Sarder Patel Stadium, Ahmedabad
Umpires: Adil Palia (Ind) and Darabshah Doodhwala (Ind)

- West Indies Women won the toss and elected to bat.
- Samantha Lobatto (Ind) made her WT20I debut.

=== 2nd T20I ===
23 January 2011
Scorecard

West Indies; 107/7 (20 overs)	v	India; 104/8 (20 overs)
Juliana Nero 44 (45); Priyanka Roy 4/19 (4 overs)		Harmanpreet Kaur 33 (33); Tremayne Smartt 3/9 (3 overs)

West Indies Women won by 3 runs
Sarder Patel Stadium, Ahmedabad
Umpires: Adil Palia (Ind) and Darabshah Doodhwala (Ind)

- West Indies Women won the toss and elected to bat.

=== 3rd T20I ===
24 January 2011
Scorecard

India; 128/5 (20 overs)	v	West Indies; 113/9 (20 overs)
Mithali Raj 51* (46); Shemaine Campbelle 3/20 (3 overs)		Stacy-Ann King 37 (31); Priyanka Roy 3/17 (4 overs)

India Women won by 15 runs
Sarder Patel Stadium, Ahmedabad
Umpires: Adil Palia (Ind) and Piyush Khakhar (Ind)

- India Women won the toss and elected to bat.
