= Sri Lanka women's cricket team in the West Indies in 2010 =

Sri Lankan women's cricket team in the West Indies in 2010
	Sri Lanka	West Indies
- Dates: 18 April – 24 April 2010
Captains	Chamani Seneviratna	Merissa Aguilleira; Anisa Mohammed (2nd ODI)

One Day International series
- Results: 2-match series drawn 1–1
Most runs	Chamani Seneviratna (50)	Shanel Daley (51)
Most wickets	Suwini de Alwis (3); Eshani Kaushalya (3)	Pamela Lavine (5)

Twenty20 International series
- Results: West Indies won the 3-match series 3–0
Most runs	Dedunu Silva (61)	Stafanie Taylor (162)
Most wickets	Shashikala Siriwardene (5); Sripali Weerakkody (5)	Anisa Mohammed (9)

The Sri Lanka national women's cricket team travelled to the West Indies prior to the 2010 ICC Women's World Twenty20 that was being there to play a two-match One Day International (ODI) series, and a three-match Twenty20 International (T20I) series against the West Indies women's cricket team.

== WODI series ==
=== 1st WODI ===
18 April
Scorecard

Sri Lanka; 129/8 (33.0 overs)	v	West Indies; 133/8 (32.3 overs)
Eshani Kaushalya 32 (49); Danielle Small 2/18 (5 overs)		Shanel Daley 23* (28); Udeshika Prabodhani 2/21 (6.3 overs)

West Indies won by 2 wickets
St Paul's Sporting Complex, St Paul's, Saint Kitts
Umpires: Luther Kelly and Vernon Weekes
Player of the match: Anisa Mohammed (West Indies)

- West Indies won the toss and elected to field
- Match was reduced to 33 overs per side
- Dilani Manodara became the first woman to be Retired out in a Women's ODI.

=== 2nd WODI ===
20 April
Scorecard

Sri Lanka; 198 (49.5 overs)	v	West Indies; 160 (47.3 overs)
Chamari Athapaththu 38 (46); Pamela Lavine 4/17 (7.5 overs)		Stafanie Taylor 36 (82); Suwini de Alwis 3/33 (9 overs)

Sri Lanka won by 38 runs
St Paul's Sporting Complex, St Paul's, Saint Kitts
Umpires: Wycliffe Mitchum and Vernon Weekes
Player of the match: Chamani Seneviratna (Sri Lanka)

- Sri Lanka won the toss and elected to bat

== WT20I series ==
=== 1st WT20I ===
21 April
Scorecard

Sri Lanka; 103/9 (20.0 overs)	v	West Indies; 106/4 (18.3 overs)
Deepika Rasangika 20 (20); Shanel Daley 3/14 (4 overs)		Stafanie Taylor 50 (50); Shashikala Siriwardene 1/15 (2 overs)

West Indies won by 6 wickets
St Mary's Park, Cayon, Saint Kitts
Umpires: Luther Kelly and Wycliffe Mitchum
Player of the match: Stafanie Taylor (West Indies)

- Sri Lanka won the toss and elected to bat

=== 2nd WT20I ===
23 April
Scorecard

Sri Lanka; 120/9 (20.0 overs)	v	West Indies; 124/7 (19.3 overs)
Dedunu Silva 36 (32); Anisa Mohammed 4/26 (3 overs)		Stafanie Taylor 54* (45); Udeshika Prabodhani 2/18 (4 overs)

West Indies won by 3 wickets
St Mary's Park, Cayon, Saint Kitts
Umpires: Luther Kelly and Vernon Weekes
Player of the match: Stafanie Taylor (West Indies)

- Sri Lanka won the toss and elected to bat

=== 3rd WT20I ===
24 April
Scorecard

West Indies; 112/9 (50.0 overs)	v	Sri Lanka; 84 (18.2 overs)
Stafanie Taylor 58 (50); Shashikala Siriwardene 3/20 (3 overs)		Chamari Athapaththu 27 (18); Anisa Mohammed 4/8 (3.2 overs)

West Indies won by 28 runs
St Mary's Park, Cayon, Saint Kitts
Umpires: Wycliffe Mitchum and Vernon Weekes
Player of the match: Anisa Mohammed

- West Indies won the toss and elected to bat
