= 2011 NatWest Women's T20 Quadrangular Series =

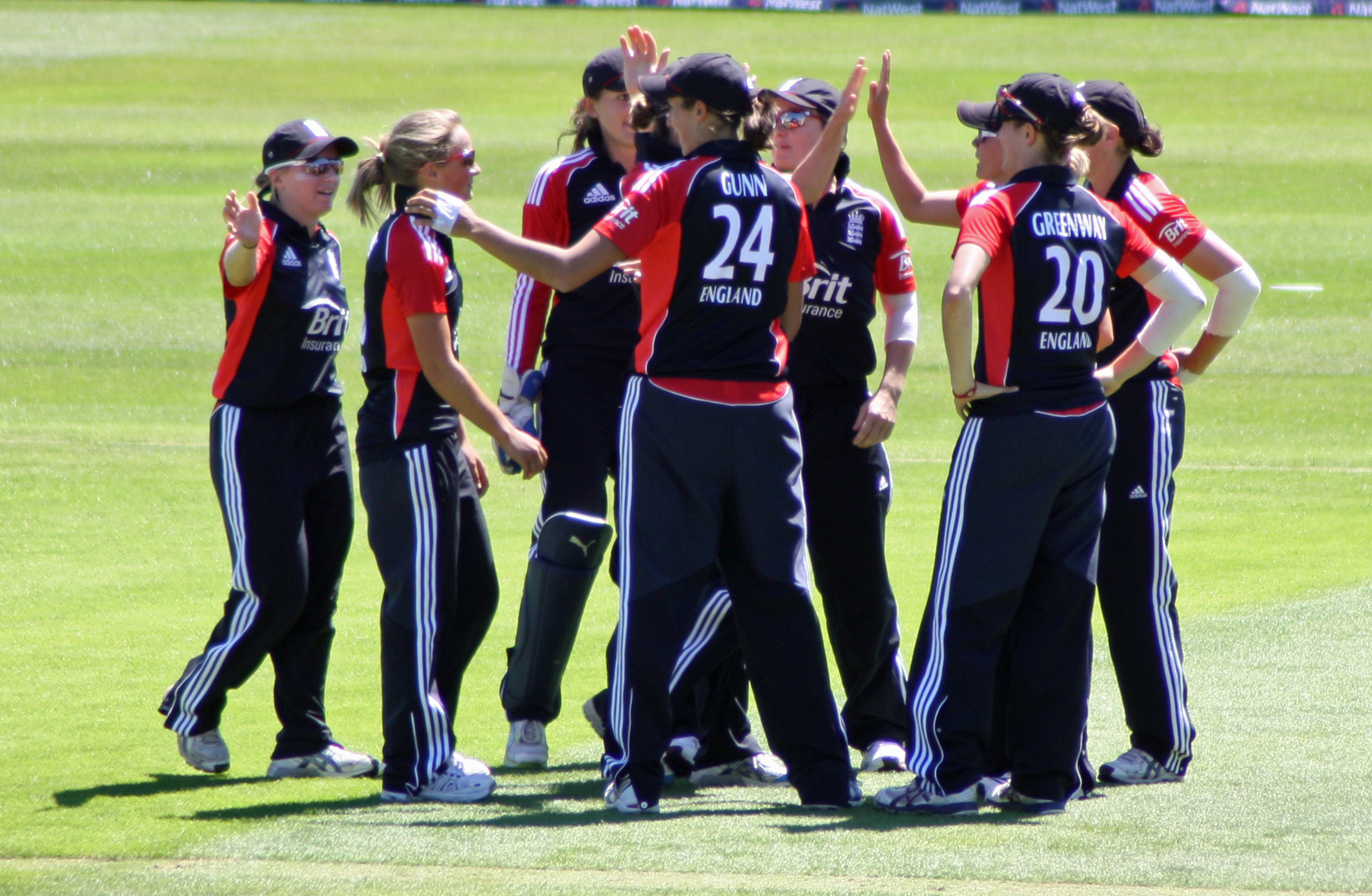
- Dates: 23 – 27 June 2011
- Administrator: England and Wales Cricket Board
- Cricket format: Women's Twenty20 International
- Host: England
- Champions: England
- Runners-up: Australia
- Participants: 4
- Matches: 8
- Player of the series: Holly Colvin (Eng)
- Most runs: Liz Perry (NZ) (118)
- Most wickets: Holly Colvin (Eng) (7)

The NatWest Women's T20 Quadrangular Series was a women's Twenty20 International series which took place in England in 2011. The top four ranked teams in the world competed: Australia, England, India and New Zealand. The tournament consisted of a round-robin group stage, in which England and Australia finished as the top two, and then a third-place play-off and a final were contested to decide the final positions. England defeated Australia by 16 runs in the final. The tournament was followed by an ODI Quadrangular Series, with the same teams competing.

== Squads ==
Australia	England	India	New Zealand
Jodie Fields (c); Alex Blackwell (vc); Jess Duffin; Sarah Coyte; Rachael Haynes; Jess Jonassen; Meg Lanning; Annie Maloney; Sharon Millanta; Shelley Nitschke; Erin Osborne; Leah Poulton; Clea Smith; Lisa Sthalekar	Charlotte Edwards (c); Jenny Gunn (vc); Arran Brindle; Katherine Brunt; Holly Colvin; Danielle Hazell; Heather Knight; Lydia Greenway; Laura Marsh; Anya Shrubsole; Claire Taylor; Sarah Taylor (wk); Fran Wilson; Danielle Wyatt	Jhulan Goswami (c); Amita Sharma (vc); Mithali Raj; Snehal Pradhan; Poonam Raut; Neha Tanwar; Harmanpreet Kaur; Samantha Lobatto (wk); Anagha Deshpande; Gouher Sultana; Priyanka Roy; Diana David; Veda Krishnamurthy; Ekta Bisht; Shilpa Gupta	Aimee Watkins (c); Amy Satterthwaite (vc); Kelly Anderson; Suzie Bates; Kate Ebrahim; Nicola Browne; Lucy Doolan; Frances Mackay; Sara McGlashan; Katey Martin; Liz Perry; Rachel Priest; Sian Ruck; Lea Tahuhu

== Points table ==
Note: P = Played, W = Wins, L = Losses, Pts = Points, NRR = Net run rate.

Pos	Team	P	W	L	Pts	NRR
1	England	3	3	0	12	+1.946
2	Australia	3	2	1	8	+0.993
3	New Zealand	3	1	2	4	−0.629
4	India	3	0	3	0	−2.231

- Source: ESPNcricinfo

== Matches ==
23 June
Scorecard

India; 62 (18.2 overs)	v	Australia; 63/2 (10.2 overs)
Harmanpreet Kaur 41 (49); Sarah Coyte 4/5 (4 overs)		Leah Poulton 31* (28); Snehal Pradhan 1/3 (1.2 overs)

Australia Women won by 8 wickets
Toby Howe Cricket Ground, Billericay
Umpires: Peter Hartley and Andy Hicks
Player of the match: Sarah Coyte (Aus)

- Australia Women won the toss and elected to field.
- Anagha Deshpande, Veda Krishnamurthy, Snehal Pradhan and Ekta Bisht (Ind) are made their WT20I debuts.

23 June
Scorecard

New Zealand; 83 (19.3 overs)	v	England; 86/2 (13.1 overs)
Suzie Bates 19 (23); Arran Brindle 3/11 (3.3 overs)		Charlotte Edwards 40* (36); Sian Ruck 1/17 (4 overs)

England Women won by 8 wickets
County Ground, Chelmsford
Umpires: Steve Garratt and Tim Robinson
Player of the match: Holly Colvin (Eng)

- England Women won the toss and elected to field.
- Kelly Anderson (NZ) made her WT20I debut.

25 June
Scorecard

England; 136/6 (20 overs)	v	Australia; 114 (18.1 overs)
Charlotte Edwards 43 (43); Erin Osborne 2/24 (4 overs)		Meg Lanning 33 (29); Danielle Wyatt 3/10 (2 overs)

England Women won by 22 runs
County Ground, Bristol
Umpires: Rob Bailey and Richard Illingworth
Player of the match: Sarah Taylor (Eng)

- Australia Women won the toss and elected to field.

25 June
Scorecard

New Zealand; 125/5 (20 overs)	v	India; 100/7 (20 overs)
Liz Perry 48* (41); Jhulan Goswami 2/18 (4 overs)		Amita Sharma 26 (19); Nicola Browne 2/17 (4 overs)

New Zealand Women won by 25 runs
Clifton College Close Ground, Bristol
Umpires: Jeff Evans and Russell Evans
Player of the match: Liz Perry (NZ)

- India Women won the toss and elected to field.
- Lea Tahuhu (NZ) made her WT20I debut.

26 June
Scorecard

New Zealand; 146/6 (20 overs)	v	Australia; 147/4 (17.5 overs)
Liz Perry 50* (37); Lisa Sthalekar 2/33 (4 overs)		Leah Poulton 61 (43); Suzie Bates 2/17 (3 overs)

Australia Women won by 6 wickets
Taunton Vale Sports Club Ground, Taunton
Umpires: Mark Eggleston and David Millns
Player of the match: Leah Poulton (Aus)

- New Zealand Women won the toss and elected to bat.
- Frances Mackay (NZ) made her WT20I debut.

26 June
Scorecard

England; 134 (19.5 overs)	v	India; 88/8 (20 overs)
Claire Taylor 66 (46); Jhulan Goswami 3/20 (4 overs)		Priyanka Roy 17* (23); Danielle Wyatt 2/20 (4 overs)

England Women won by 46 runs
County Ground, Taunton
Umpires: Paul Baldwin and Trevor Jesty
Player of the match: Claire Taylor (Eng)

- England Women won the toss and elected to bat.
- Neha Tanwar (Ind) made her WT20I debut.

=== Third-place play-off ===
27 June
Scorecard

New Zealand; 95/7 (20 overs)	v	India; 96/7 (19.5 overs)
Amy Satterthwaite 35 (44); Amita Sharma 2/11 (4 overs)		Jhulan Goswami 33* (28); Kelly Anderson 3/17 (4 overs)

India Women won by 3 wickets
Officers Club Services Ground, Aldershot
Umpires: Richard Kettleborough and Jeremy Lloyds
Player of the match: Jhulan Goswami (Ind)

- New Zealand Women won the toss and elected to bat.

=== Final ===
27 June
Scorecard

England; 132/9 (20 overs)	v	Australia; 116/8 (20 overs)
Lydia Greenway 48 (36); Erin Osborne 2/21 (4 overs)		Lisa Sthalekar 43 (37); Holly Colvin 2/16 (4 overs)

England Women won by 16 runs
The Rose Bowl, Southampton
Umpires: Martin Bodenham and Michael Gough
Player of the match: Lydia Greenway (Eng)

- Australia Women won the toss and elected to field.

== Players statistics ==
=== Most runs ===
Player	Team	Innings	Runs	Average	Strike rate	Highest Score
Liz Perry	New Zealand	4	118	59.00	110.28	50*
Leah Poulton	Australia	4	111	37.00	120.65	61
Charlotte Edwards	England	4	110	36.66	100.91	43
Claire Taylor	England	4	91	22.75	122.97	66
Jess Cameron	Australia	3	77	25.66	120.31	47
Nicola Browne	New Zealand	4	75	25.00	125.00	28
Qualification: 75 runs. Source: ESPNcricinfo

=== Most wickets ===
Player	Team	Overs	Wickets	Average	Economy	BBI
Holly Colvin	England	15.1	7	9.85	4.54	3/17
Snehal Pradhan	India	11.1	6	10.66	5.73	3/30
Arran Brindle	England	14.3	6	11.66	4.82	3/11
Jhulan Goswami	India	14.0	6	12.16	5.21	3/20
Sarah Coyte	Australia	16.0	6	16.00	6.00	4/5
Qualification: 6 wickets. Source: ESPNcricinfo

== See also ==
- 2011 NatWest Women's Quadrangular Series
