= Sri Lanka women's cricket team in India in 2015–16 =

International cricket tour

Sri Lanka women's tour of India
	India women	Sri Lanka women
- Dates: 15 February – 26 February
Captains	Mithali Raj	Shashikala Siriwardene

One Day International series
- Results: India women won the 3-match series 3–0
Most runs	Smriti Mandhana (107)	Prasadini Weerakkody (125)
Most wickets	Deepti Sharma (12)	Sugandika Kumari (5)

Twenty20 International series
- Results: India women won the 3-match series 3–0
Most runs	Smriti Mandhana (83)	Dilani Manodara (68)
Most wickets	Ekta Bisht (7)	Inoka Ranaweera (4)

Sri Lankan women's cricket team toured India in February 2016. The tour included a series of 3 One Day Internationals and 3 Twenty20 internationals. The ODIs were part of the 2014–16 ICC Women's Championship. India won both series by 3–0.

== Squads ==
ODIs		T20Is	
India	Sri Lanka	India	Sri Lanka
Mithali Raj (c); Jhulan Goswami (vc); Rajeshwari Gayakwad; Ravi Kalpana (wk); Thirush Kamini; Harmanpreet Kaur; Veda Krishnamurthy; Smriti Mandhana; Niranjana Nagarajan; Shikha Pandey; Poonam Yadav; Preeti Bose; Poonam Raut; Deepti Sharma; Sushma Verma (wk)	Shashikala Siriwardene (c); Chamari Atapattu (vc); Nipuni Hansika; Ama Kanchana; Hansima Karunaratne; Sugandika Kumari; Eshani Lokusuriyage; Dilani Manodara; Yasoda Mendis; Udeshika Prabodhani; Oshadi Ranasinghe; Inoka Ranaweera; Nilakshi de Silva; Prasadini Weerakkody (wk); Stand-by Players: Chandima Gunaratne; Lasanthi Madushani; Maduri Samuddika; Anushka Sanjeewani; Sripali Weerakkody	Mithali Raj (c); Jhulan Goswami (vc); Rajeshwari Gayakwad; Thirush Kamini; Harmanpreet Kaur; Veda Krishnamurthy; Smriti Mandhana; Niranjana Nagarajan; Shikha Pandey; Anuja Patil; Poonam Yadav; Sneh Rana; Vellaswamy Vanitha; Sushma Verma (wk)	Shashikala Siriwardene (c); Chamari Atapattu (vc); Nipuni Hansika; Ama Kanchana; Hansima Karunaratne; Sugandika Kumari; Eshani Lokusuriyage; Dilani Manodara; Yasoda Mendis; Udeshika Prabodhani; Oshadi Ranasinghe; Inoka Ranaweera; Nilakshi de Silva; Prasadini Weerakkody (wk); Stand-by Players: Chandima Gunaratne; Lasanthi Madushani; Maduri Samuddika; Anushka Sanjeewani; Sripali Weerakkody

== WODI series ==
=== 1st WODI ===
ICC Women's Championship
15 February
09:00 IST (UTC+05:30)
Scorecard

India; 245/6 (50 overs)	v	Sri Lanka; 138 (45.2 overs)
Smriti Mandhana 55 (81); Shashikala Siriwardene 2/31 (8 overs)		Prasadini Weerakkody 69 (113); Poonam Yadav 4/22 (7.2 overs)

India Women won by 107 runs
JSCA International Stadium Complex, Ranchi
Umpires: Kamlesh Sharma (Ind) and Jayaraman Madanagopal (Ind)
Player of the match: Smriti Mandhana (Ind Women)

- Sri Lanka Women won the toss and elected to field.
- ICC Women's Championship points: India Women 2, Sri Lanka Women 0

=== 2nd WODI ===
ICC Women's Championship
17 February
09:00 IST (UTC+05:30)
Scorecard

Sri Lanka; 178/9 (50 overs)	v	India; 179/4 (43.1 overs)
Dilani Manodara 43* (51); Deepti Sharma 4/23 (9 overs)		Mithali Raj 53* (80); Sugandika Kumari 4/39 (10 overs)

India Women won by 6 wickets
JSCA International Stadium Complex, Ranchi
Umpires: Jayaraman Madanagopal (Ind) and Navdeep Singh (Ind)
Player of the match: Deepti Sharma (Ind)

- Sri Lanka Women won the toss elected to bat.
- ICC Women's Championship points: India Women 2, Sri Lanka Women 0

=== 3rd WODI ===
ICC Women's Championship
19 February
09:00 IST (UTC+05:30)
Scorecard

Sri Lanka; 112 (38.2 overs)	v	India; 114/3 (29.3 overs)
Dilani Manodara 23 (60); Deepti Sharma 6/20 (9.2 overs)		Veda Krishnamurthy 61* (90); Sugandika Kumari 1/18 (7 overs)

India Women won by 7 wickets
JSCA International Stadium Complex, Ranchi
Umpires: Kamlesh Sharma (Ind) and Navdeep Singh (Ind)
Player of the match: Deepti Sharma (Ind)

- Sri Lanka Women won the toss elected to bat.
- Preeti Bose (Ind) and Hansima Karunaratne (SL) made their ODI debut.
- ICC Women's Championship points: India Women 2, Sri Lanka Women 0

== WT20I series ==
=== 1st T20I ===
22 February
10:00 IST (UTC+05:30)
Scorecard

India; 130/6 (20 overs)	v	Sri Lanka; 96/7 (20 overs)
Harmanpreet Kaur 36 (41); Sugandika Kumari 3/28 (4 overs)		Dilani Manodara 41* (44); Anuja Patil 3/14 (4 overs)

India Women won by 34 runs
JSCA International Stadium Complex, Ranchi
Umpires: Nitin Pandit (Ind) and Ramamurthy Sundar (Ind)
Player of the match: Anuja Patil (Ind)

- India Women won the toss elected to bat.
- Hansima Karunaratne (SL) made her T20I debut.

=== 2nd T20I ===
24 February
10:00 IST (UTC+05:30)
Scorecard

Sri Lanka; 107/8 (20 overs)	v	India; 108/5 (19 overs)
Dilani Manodara 27 (25); Poonam Yadav 3/17 (2 overs)		Mithali Raj 51* (52); Inoka Ranaweera 3/10 (4 overs)

India Women won by 5 wickets
JSCA International Stadium Complex, Ranchi
Umpires: Ravi Subramanian (Ind) and Ramamurthy Sundar (Ind)
Player of the match: Mithali Raj (Ind)

- Sri Lanka Women won the toss and elected to bat.

=== 3rd T20I ===
26 February
10:00 IST (UTC+05:30)
Scorecard

Sri Lanka; 89/9 (20 overs)	v	India; 91/1 (13.5 overs)
Eshani Lokusuriyage 25* (22); Ekta Bisht 3/17 (4 overs)		Smriti Mandhana 43* (43); Chamari Atapattu 1/19 (3 overs)

India Women won by 9 wickets
JSCA International Stadium Complex, Ranchi
Umpires: Ravi Subramanian (Ind) and Nitin Pandit (Ind)
Player of the match: Smriti Mandhana (Ind)

- Sri Lanka Women won the toss and elected to bat.

== See also ==
- India Women's tour of Australia
- 2014–16 ICC Women's Championship
