= List of Sri Lanka women Twenty20 International cricketers =

Since their first match in 2009, 59 women have represented the Sri Lanka national women's cricket team in Twenty20 Internationals (WT20Is). A Twenty20 International is a cricket match between two international representative teams, each having WT20I status, as determined by the International Cricket Council (ICC).

This list includes all players who have played at least one Twenty20 International match and is initially arranged in the order of debut appearance. Where more than one player won their first cap in the same match, their surnames are listed alphabetically based on the time of their debut.

== Key ==
General

- ‡ – Captain
- † – Wicket-keeper
- First – Year of debut
- Last – Year of latest game
- Mat – Number of matches played

Fielding

- Ca – Catches taken
- St – Stumpings taken

Batting

- Runs – Runs scored in career
- HS – Highest score
- Avg – Average runs scored per dismissal
- 50s – Number of half centuries
- 100 – Centuries scored
- * – Batsman remained not out

Bowling

- Balls – Balls bowled in career
- Wkt – Wickets taken in career
- BBI – Best bowling in an innings
- Ave – Average runs conceded per wicket

== Players ==
Statistics are correct as of 22 September 2026.

Sri Lanka Women T20I cricketers
Cap	Name	First	Last	Mat	Batting					Bowling				Fielding		Ref
Cap	Name	First	Last	Mat	Runs	HS	Avg	50	100	Balls	Wkt	BBI	Ave	Ca	St	Ref
1	Chamika Bandara	2009	2009	2	10	10	5.00	0	0	12	0	—	—	1	0	
2	Sandamali Dolawatte	2009	2013	24	97	17*	6.46	0	0	133	5	3/0	26.20	2	0	
3	Hiruka Fernando	2009	2010	4	12	6	3.00	0	0	—	—	—	—	0	0	
4	Rose Fernando	2009	2009	3	—	—	—	—	—	54	2	1/16	30.50	0	0	
5	Inoka Galagedara	2009	2012	23	309	42*	14.71	0	0	—	—	—	—	1	0	
6	Eshani Lokusuriyage	2009	2018	68	780	50	14.18	1	0	734	36	4/18	19.77	16	0	
7	Chamari Polgampola‡	2009	2015	19	135	20	7.94	0	0	168	3	1/17	61.00	6	0	
8	Udeshika Prabodhani	2009	2024	106	128	14	6.40	0	0	2039	84	3/13	22.39	23	0	
9	Deepika Rasangika† (Note: Deepika Rasangika has also played Twenty20 International cricket for Bahrain. Only her record for Sri Lanka is given above.)	2009	2014	32	314	39	14.95	0	0	118	7	2/19	19.42	6	0	
10	Dilani Manodara‡†	2009	2019	62	752	50*	19.78	1	0	—	—	—	—	12	15	
11	Sripali Weerakkody†	2009	2019	58	209	17	7.20	0	0	863	31	3/23	29.32	1	0	
12	Chamari Athapaththu‡	2009	2026	173	4311	119*	27.11	16	4	1920	92	7/5	23.17	47	0	
13	Sanduni Abeywickrema	2009	2010	2	—	—	—	—	—	6	0	—	—	0	0	
14	Suwini de Alwis	2010	2011	10	98	26	10.88	0	0	177	10	2/5	16.10	3	0	
15	Chamani Seneviratna‡ (Note: Chamani Seneviratna has also played Twenty20 International cricket for United Arab Emirates. Only her record for Sri Lanka is given above.)	2010	2013	32	124	25	6.88	0	0	553	28	4/21	17.42	12	0	
16	Dedunu Silva	2010	2010	6	95	36	15.83	0	0	—	—	—	—	4	0	
17	Shashikala Siriwardene‡	2010	2020	81	1097	52	17.14	2	0	1653	77	4/9	20.75	16	0	
18	Lasanthi Madushani	2010	2016	10	125	63*	17.85	1	0	18	2	2/17	14.50	0	0	
19	Chandi Wickramasinghe	2010	2010	1	1	1	1.00	0	0	—	—	—	—	0	0	
20	Rangika Fernando	2010	2013	3	9	8	4.50	0	0	54	1	1/30	53.00	1	0	
21	Sharina Ravikumar	2010	2018	3	3	3	1.50	0	0	60	2	1/21	32.50	0	0	
22	Yasoda Mendis	2011	2018	56	627	45	11.83	0	0	18	0	—	—	12	0	
23	Dharshani Dharmasiri	2012	2012	3	10	6*	5.00	0	0	24	0	—	—	1	0	
24	Chandima Gunaratne	2012	2017	19	1	1*	1.00	0	0	386	11	2/7	34.18	2	0	
25	Prasadani Weerakkody	2012	2019	27	303	48	13.17	0	0	—	—	—	—	8	11	
26	Maduri Samuddika	2012	2015	19	15	9	3.00	0	0	380	17	3/11	22.70	0	0	
27	Inoka Ranaweera‡	2012	2026	91	66	18*	5.50	0	0	1862	97	4/7	19.06	13	0	
28	Oshadi Ranasinghe	2013	2023	66	404	34*	9.61	0	0	1189	58	3/18	23.50	11	0	
29	Ama Kanchana	2013	2024	52	274	19*	8.56	0	0	526	16	3/22	41.43	8	0	
30	Nilakshi de Silva	2013	2026	125	1482	63*	20.02	3	0	324	15	3/13	23.33	56	0	
31	Nipuni Hansika	2013	2018	20	189	24	9.45	0	0	—	—	—	—	2	0	
32	Niluka Karunaratne	2013	2013	1	5	5*	—	0	0	—	—	—	—	0	0	
33	Rebeca Vandort†	2013	2018	22	132	50	12.00	1	0	—	—	—	—	13	11	
34	Anushka Sanjeewani†	2014	2025	86	764	61	14.41	1	0	—	—	—	—	28	34	
35	Hasini Perera‡	2014	2026	106	1130	65	13.95	2	0	—	—	—	—	22	2	
36	Inoshi Priyadharshani	2014	2025	40	11	2*	2.75	0	0	722	40	4/10	18.27	12	0	
37	Chathurani Gunawardene	2015	2016	5	30	14	10.00	0	0	90	3	2/25	33.66	0	0	
38	Sugandika Kumari	2015	2026	109	120	10	5.00	0	0	2194	83	3/17	27.28	22	0	
39	Achini Kulasuriya	2015	2025	40	16	6*	5.33	0	0	578	19	2/19	35.78	3	0	
40	Hansima Karunaratne	2016	2026	25	183	44*	12.20	0	0	72	0	—	—	8	0	
41	Harshitha Samarawickrama	2016	2026	99	1977	86*	27.08	9	0	—	—	—	—	13	0	
42	Imalka Mendis	2018	2019	8	108	25*	18.00	0	0	—	—	—	—	3	0	
43	Malsha Shehani	2018	2023	12	47	14	5.22	0	0	96	4	4/2	25.00	1	0	
44	Kavisha Dilhari	2018	2026	96	853	51*	15.23	1	0	1664	82	4/13	22.10	41	0	
45	Umesha Thimashini	2019	2020	8	46	20	7.66	0	0	4	0	—	—	0	0	
46	Madushika Methtananda	2019	2019	1	—	—	—	—	—	12	0	—	—	0	0	
47	Sathya Sandeepani	2020	2020	1	0	0	0.00	0	0	6	0	—	—	0	0	
48	Vishmi Gunaratne	2022	2026	61	892	73*	17.49	3	0	—	—	—	—	9	0	
49	Sachini Nisansala	2022	2024	13	3	3	1.00	0	0	259	7	2/10	37.28	3	0	
50	Tharika Sewwandi	2022	2022	3	—	—	—	—	—	36	0	—	—	0	0	
51	Kaushini Nuthyangana†	2022	2026	27	159	24*	13.25	0	0	—	—	—	—	16	6	
52	Kawya Kavindi	2023	2026	22	51	17	17.00	0	0	325	15	2/7	28.00	7	0	
53	Imesha Dulani	2023	2026	27	520	101*	23.63	2	1	—	—	—	—	7	0	
54	Shashini Gimhani	2024	2025	7	0	0	0.00	0	0	108	6	3/9	21.16	1	0	
55	Malki Madara	2025	2026	14	14	5*	14.00	0	0	256	12	3/14	25.91	1	0	
56	Manudi Nanayakkara	2025	2025	3	35	35	35.00	0	0	—	—	—	—	1	0	
57	Rashmika Sewwandi	2025	2026	9	19	14*	19.00	0	0	66	2	2/42	59.00	2	0	
58	Nimasha Meepage	2025	2026	9	1	1*	—	0	0	240	6	1/16	38.33	2	0	
59	Mithali Ayodhya	2026	2026	14	4	3	1.33	0	0	287	13	3/14	28.23	1	0	
60	Chamudi Praboda	2026	2026	11	0	0*	—	0	0	252	10	3/21	27.40	4	0	
61	Sanjana Kavindi	2026	2026	6	95	46	19.00	0	0	—	—	—	—	1	0	
62	Chethana Vimukthi	2026	2026	3	—	—	—	—	—	60	3	3/16	17.00	1	0	
