= Pakistan women's cricket team in the West Indies in 2011 =

	West Indies	Pakistan
- Dates: 28 August – 11 September 2011
Captains	Merissa Aguilleira	Sana Mir

One Day International series
- Results: West Indies won the 4-match series 3–1
Most runs	Merissa Aguilleira (106)	Bismah Maroof (65)
Most wickets	Anisa Mohammed (14)	Nida Dar (9)
- Player of the series: Anisa Mohammed (WI)

Twenty20 International series
- Results: West Indies won the 4-match series 3–1
Most runs	Stafanie Taylor (72)	Bismah Maroof (62)
Most wickets	Anisa Mohammed (8)	Sadia Yousuf (7)
- Player of the series: Shanel Daley (WI)

The Pakistan women's national cricket team toured the West Indies in August and September 2011. They played the West Indies in four One Day Internationals and four Twenty20 Internationals, with the West Indies winning both series 3–1.

== Squads ==
West Indies	Pakistan
Merissa Aguilleira (c) (wk); Shemaine Campbelle; Britney Cooper; Shanel Daley; Deandra Dottin; Pearl Etienne; Stacy-Ann King; Kycia Knight; Anisa Mohammed; Juliana Nero; Shaquana Quintyne; Shakera Selman; Tremayne Smartt; Stafanie Taylor	Sana Mir (c); Nain Abidi; Nida Dar; Batool Fatima (wk); Mariam Hasan; Kainat Imtiaz; Asmavia Iqbal; Marina Iqbal; Qanita Jalil; Masooma Junaid; Javeria Khan; Bismah Maroof; Rabiya Shah (wk); Sadia Yousuf

== WODI Series ==
=== 1st ODI ===
28 August 2011
Scorecard

Pakistan; 82 (40.5 overs)	v	West Indies; 83/2 (19.3 overs)
Nain Abidi 26 (63); Anisa Mohammed 5/5 (10 overs)		Deandra Dottin 36* (32); Masooma Junaid 1/9 (3 overs)

West Indies Women won by 8 wickets
Arnos Vale Stadium, Arnos Vale, Saint Vincent
Umpires: Clancy Mack (WI) and Lennox Abraham (WI)
Player of the match: Anisa Mohammed (WI)

- West Indies Women won the toss and elected to field.
- Kycia Knight (WI) made her WODI debut.

=== 2nd ODI ===
30 August 2011
Scorecard

West Indies; 175/9 (50 overs)	v	Pakistan; 86 (44 overs)
Merissa Aguilleira 71 (102); Sadia Yousuf 2/27 (10 overs)		Javeria Khan 21 (39); Anisa Mohammed 5/7 (10 overs)

West Indies Women won by 89 runs
Arnos Vale Stadium, Arnos Vale, Saint Vincent
Umpires: Goaland Greaves (WI) and Lennox Abraham (WI)
Player of the match: Anisa Mohammed (WI)

- Pakistan Women won the toss and elected to field.

=== 3rd ODI ===
1 September 2011
Scorecard

West Indies; 92 (38 overs)	v	Pakistan; 93/7 (47.1 overs)
Merissa Aguilleira 34 (87); Nida Dar 4/16 (7 overs)		Bismah Maroof 41* (135); Tremayne Smartt 2/15 (5 overs)

Pakistan Women won by 3 wickets
Arnos Vale Stadium, Arnos Vale, Saint Vincent
Umpires: Goaland Greaves (WI) and Lennox Abraham (WI)
Player of the match: Bismah Maroof (Pak)

- Pakistan Women won the toss and elected to field.
- Shaquana Quintyne (WI) made her WODI debut.

=== 4th ODI ===
3 September 2011
Scorecard

West Indies; 154/8 (50 overs)	v	Pakistan; 97 (41.2 overs)
Juliana Nero 29 (42); Nida Dar 3/13 (10 overs)		Javeria Khan 20 (42); Anisa Mohammed 4/17 (6.2 overs)

West Indies Women won by 50 runs (D/L)
Arnos Vale Stadium, Arnos Vale, Saint Vincent
Umpires: Goaland Greaves (WI) and Lennox Abraham (WI)
Player of the match: Anisa Mohammed (WI)

- West Indies Women won the toss and elected to bat.
- Pakistan Women's target was revised to 148 runs from 45 overs due to rain.

== WT20I Series ==
=== 1st T20I ===
6 September 2011
Scorecard

West Indies; 90/8 (18 overs)	v	Pakistan; 56/3 (11 overs)
Stafanie Taylor 24 (26); Qanita Jalil 2/14 (3 overs)		Nain Abidi 21* (20); Anisa Mohammed 1/7 (2 overs)

West Indies Women won by 1 run (D/L)
Progress Park, Grenville, Grenada
Umpires: Clancy Mack (WI) and Nigel Duguid (WI)
Player of the match: Stafanie Taylor (WI)

- Pakistan Women won the toss and elected to field.
- West Indies Women innings reduced to 18 overs due to rain.
- Pakistan Women's target was revised to 58 runs from 11 overs due to rain.
- Kycia Knight (WI) made her WT20I debut.

=== 2nd T20I ===
7 September 2011
Scorecard

Pakistan; 65 (18.5 overs)	v	West Indies; 66/6 (17.5 overs)
Qanita Jalil 19 (18); Anisa Mohammed 4/9 (4 overs)		Stacy-Ann King 32* (32); Nida Dar 1/11 (4 overs)

West Indies Women won by 4 wickets
Progress Park, Grenville, Grenada
Umpires: Clancy Mack (WI) and Nigel Duguid (WI)
Player of the match: Stacy-Ann King (WI)

- Pakistan Women won the toss and elected to bat.

=== 3rd T20I ===
10 September 2011
Scorecard

West Indies; 115/5 (20 overs)	v	Pakistan; 116/5 (17.3 overs)
Stafanie Taylor 48 (48); Sadia Yousuf 3/25 (4 overs)		Bismah Maroof 43* (52); Shanel Daley 3/17 (4 overs)

Pakistan Women won by 5 wickets
Providence Stadium, Providence, Guyana
Umpires: Clancy Mack (WI) and Peter Nero (WI)
Player of the match: Bismah Maroof (Pak)

- Pakistan Women won the toss and elected to field.

=== 4th T20I ===
11 September 2011
Scorecard

Pakistan; 72/9 (20 overs)	v	West Indies; 72 (20 overs)
Qanita Jalil 15 (18); Shanel Daley 3/9 (4 overs)		Shanel Daley 28 (42); Sana Mir 3/11 (4 overs)

Match Tied (West Indies Women won the Super Over)
Providence Stadium, Providence, Guyana
Umpires: Clancy Mack (WI) and Nigel Duguid (WI)
Player of the match: Shanel Daley (WI)

- West Indies Women won the toss and elected to field.
- Super Over: West Indies Women 10/1, Pakistan Women 7/1.
- Shaquana Quintyne (WI) made her WT20I debut.
