= Aaron Daley =

Aaron Daley may refer to:

- Aaron Daley (cricketer, born 1956)
- Aaron Daley (cricketer, born 1989)
