= Lobatto =

Lobatto is a surname. Notable people with the surname include:

- Rehuel Lobatto (1797–1866), Dutch mathematician
- Samantha Lobatto (born 1988), Indian cricketer
