= Rose Fernando =

Sri Lankan cricketer

Personal information
- Full name: Warnakolasooriya Rose Priyanka Fernando
- Born: 28 July 1979 (age 47); Wennappuwa, Sri Lanka
- Batting: Right-handed
- Bowling: Right-arm off break
- Role: Bowler
- Relatives: Hiruka Fernando (sister)

International information
- National side: Sri Lanka (1997–2010)
- Only Test (cap 3): 17 April 1998 v Pakistan
- ODI debut (cap 14): 30 November 1997 v Netherlands
- Last ODI: 14 March 2009 v Australia
- T20I debut (cap 4): 12 June 2009 v Pakistan
- Last T20I: 15 June 2009 v India

Domestic team information
- Years: Team
- 2000–2008/09: Slimline Sports Club
- 2009/10: Kurunegala Youth Cricket Club
- 2011–2012/13: Sri Lanka Air Force Sports Club
- 2015–2019: Hertfordshire

Umpiring information
- WT20Is umpired: 1 (2025)

Career statistics
Competition	WTest	WODI	WT20I	WLA
Matches	1	37	3	53
Runs scored	52	176	–	265
Batting average	52.00	10.35	–	10.60
100s/50s	0/0	0/0	–	0/0
Top score	44	27	–	34
Balls bowled	174	1,631	54	2,065
Wickets	4	43	2	51
Bowling average	17.25	14.41	30.50	16.05
5 wickets in innings	0	0	0	0
10 wickets in match	0	0	0	0
Best bowling	3/28	4/3	1/16	4/3
Catches/stumpings	1/–	10/–	0/–	13/–
- Source: CricketArchive, 9 December 2021

Warnakolasooriya Rose Priyanka Dovey (née Fernando; born 28 July 1979) is a Sri Lankan former cricketer and current cricket umpire. Her main claim to fame was her bowling and she played primarily as a right-arm off break bowler. She appeared in one Test match, 37 One Day Internationals and three Twenty20 Internationals for Sri Lanka women's cricket team between 1997 and 2010. Her sister Hiruka also played cricket for Sri Lanka.

== Career ==
Fernando made her only Women's Test cricket appearance in a 1998 match against Pakistan. She scored 44 runs in the first innings, and took three wickets in the second innings. Fernando played for Sri Lanka at the 2002 Indoor Cricket World Cup. In October 2008, she and her sister (Hiruka) named in Sri Lanka team for the series against the West Indies. In 2009, she was given a contract by Sri Lanka Cricket. In the same year, Fernando represented Sri Lanka at the 2009 Women's Cricket World Cup. In a World Cup match against England, Fernando was reported for an illegal bowling action, as well as England bowler Jenny Gunn.
