= Hiruka Fernando =

Sri Lankan cricketer (born 1976)

Personal information
- Full name: Wannakawatiawadune Hiruka Dilani Fernando
- Born: 30 September 1976 (age 50); Moratuwa, Sri Lanka
- Batting: Left-handed
- Bowling: Slow left-arm orthodox
- Role: Batter
- Relatives: Rose Fernando (sister)

International information
- National side: Sri Lanka
- ODI debut (cap 3): 25 November 1997 v Netherlands
- Last ODI: 12 October 2010 v Ireland
- T20I debut (cap 3): 12 June 2009 v Pakistan
- Last T20I: 6 May 2010 v Pakistan

Domestic team information
- Years: Team
- 1998–2011: Colts Cricket Club
- 2000–2009: Slimline Sports Club

Career statistics
Competition	WODI	WT20I	LA	T20
Matches	60	4	109	13
Runs scored	1,015	12	2,005	206
Batting average	21.14	3.00	22.78	22.88
100s/50s	0/3	0/0	2/6	0/2
Top score	78*	6	101	68*
Balls bowled	444	–	1,199	84
Wickets	12	–	44	7
Bowling average	22.75	–	13.65	6.71
5 wickets in innings	0	–	0	0
10 wickets in match	0	–	0	0
Best bowling	3/14	–	4/11	4/3
Catches/stumpings	9/–	0/–	17/–	3/–
- Source: Cricinfo, 14 May 2020

Hiruka Fernando (born 30 September 1976) is a former Sri Lankan cricketer. She played in 60 Women's One Day International (WODIS) and 4 Women's Twenty20 International (WT20Is) for Sri Lanka. She was the first woman to score 1,000 runs in ODIs for Sri Lanka. Her sister Rose also played cricket for Sri Lanka.

She played domestic cricket for Colts Cricket Club. In October 2008, the Fernando sister called up for the West Indies series. In October 2010, she retired from International cricket.
