= Hansima Karunaratne =

Sri Lankan cricketer (born 1993)

Personal information
- Full name: Hiyarage Ishani Hansima Karunaratne
- Born: 4 October 1993 (age 33); Nivitigala, Sri Lanka
- Batting: Right-handed
- Bowling: Right arm medium
- Role: Batter

International information
- National side: Sri Lanka
- ODI debut (cap 65): 19 February 2016 v India
- Last ODI: 1 July 2022 v India
- T20I debut (cap 41): 22 February 2016 v India
- Last T20I: 29 February 2020 v India
Medal record
Women's cricket
Representing Sri Lanka
Asian Games
Silver medal – second place	2026 Aichi–Nagoya	Team
- Source: ESPNcricinfo, 1 July 2022

Hansima Karunaratne (born 4 October 1993) is a Sri Lankan cricketer who plays for the Sri Lanka women's cricket team. She made both her One Day International and Twenty20 International debut against India in February 2016. She was a member of Sri Lanka's squad for the 2020 ICC Women's T20 World Cup in Australia.
