= Mark Eggleston =

English cricket umpire

Personal information
- Full name: Mark Andrew Eggleston
- Born: 14 December 1963 (age 62); Blackburn, Lancashire, England
- Role: Umpire

Umpiring information
- WODIs umpired: 1 (2012)
- WT20Is umpired: 1 (2011)
- FC umpired: 9 (2009–2013)
- LA umpired: 10 (2010–2013)
- Source: CricketArchive, 4 July 2014

Mark Andrew Eggleston (born 14 December 1963) is an English former cricket umpire who stood in nine first-class matches and 10 List A matches between 2009 and 2013. He also stood as an umpire in the match between Australia and New Zealand in the Women's T20 Quadrangular Series in England in 2011, and in the 4th ODI between England Women and India Women in 2012. Born in Blackburn, Lancashire, Eggleston began his umpiring career in the Lancashire League, and served in the league until 2009, before returning in 2014.
