= Rangika Fernando =

Sri Lankan cricketer (born 1988)

Personal information
- Born: 6 December 1988 (age 37)

International information
- National side: Sri Lanka
- T20I debut (cap 20): 22 November 2010 v England
- Last T20I: 1 March 2013 v West Indies
- Source: Cricinfo, 14 June 2021

Rangika Fernando (born 6 December 1988) is a Sri Lankan cricketer who played for the Sri Lanka women's cricket team. She made her Women's Twenty20 International cricket (WT20I) debut against England Women on 22 November 2010. She later became a coach, working with schools in Sri Lanka.
