= Nobet Ida =

Sri Lankan cricketer (born 1993)

Personal information
- Born: 20 May 1993 (age 33)

International information
- National side: Sri Lanka
- Only ODI (cap 55): 24 October 2013 v South Africa
- Source: Cricinfo, 14 June 2021

Nobet Ida (born 20 May 1993) is a Sri Lankan cricketer who played for the Sri Lanka women's cricket team. In October 2013, she was one of three uncapped players to be selected for Sri Lanka's tour to South Africa. She made her Women's One Day International cricket (WODI) debut for Sri Lanka against South Africa Women on 24 October 2013.
