= Aaron Daley (cricketer, born 1956) =

Jamaican cricketer (born 1956)

Personal information
- Born: 2 May 1956 (age 70); St Catherine, Jamaica
- Role: Fast bowler
- Relatives: Shanel Daley (daughter)
- Source: Cricinfo, 5 November 2020

Aaron Daley (born 2 May 1956) is a Jamaican cricketer. He played in twenty-four first-class and sixteen List A matches for the Jamaican cricket team from 1982 to 1991.

Daley is the father of West Indies international Shanel Daley.

== See also ==
- List of Jamaican representative cricketers
