= Niluka Karunaratne (cricketer) =

Sri Lankan cricketer (born 1979)

Personal information
- Born: 7 September 1979 (age 47)

International information
- National side: Sri Lanka
- ODI debut (cap 56): 26 October 2013 v South Africa
- Last ODI: 28 October 2013 v South Africa
- Only T20I (cap 32): 31 October 2013 v South Africa
- Source: Cricinfo, 14 June 2021

Niluka Karunaratne (born 7 September 1979) is a Sri Lankan cricketer who played for the Sri Lanka women's cricket team. In October 2013, she was one of three uncapped players to be selected for Sri Lanka's tour to South Africa. She made her Women's One Day International cricket (WODI) debut for Sri Lanka against South Africa Women on 26 October 2013. She made her Women's Twenty20 International cricket (WT20I) debut for Sri Lanka, also against South Africa Women, on 31 October 2013.
