= St Mary's Park (Saint Kitts and Nevis) =

Cricket ground in Cayon, St Kitts and Nevis

- Interactive map of St Mary's Park

Ground information
- Location: Cayon, Saint Kitts and Nevis
- Country: Saint Kitts and Nevis
- Coordinates: 17.3491°N 62.7275°W
- Establishment: c. 1993

International information
- First women's T20I: 21 April 2010: West Indies v Sri Lanka
- Last women's T20I: 24 April 2010: West Indies v Sri Lanka

Team information
Leeward Islands	(2006/07)
- As of 6 March 2022; Source: Ground profile

St Mary's Park is a cricket ground and former football ground in Saint Kitts and Nevis.

== History ==
Located at Cayon on the island of Saint Kitts, the ground has played host to the Leeward Islands cricket team for two major cricket matches in January 2007. The first of these was a first-class match against Jamaica in the 2006–07 Carib Beer Cup. The match ended in a draw, with notable contributions from Sylvester Joseph (97) and Omari Banks (100) for the Leeward Islands, and Wavell Hinds (100) for Jamaica. Following the conclusion of this match, the two sides played a List A one-day match in the KFC Cup. Jamaica won the match by 5 wickets, despite a century from Sylvester Joseph. The ground later played host to three Women's Twenty20 Internationals between West Indies women and Sri Lanka women.

The ground was previously the home of Cayon Rockets football club, who play in the SKNFA Premier League.

== See also ==
- List of cricket grounds in the West Indies
