= Anisa Mohammed =

Trinidadian cricketer

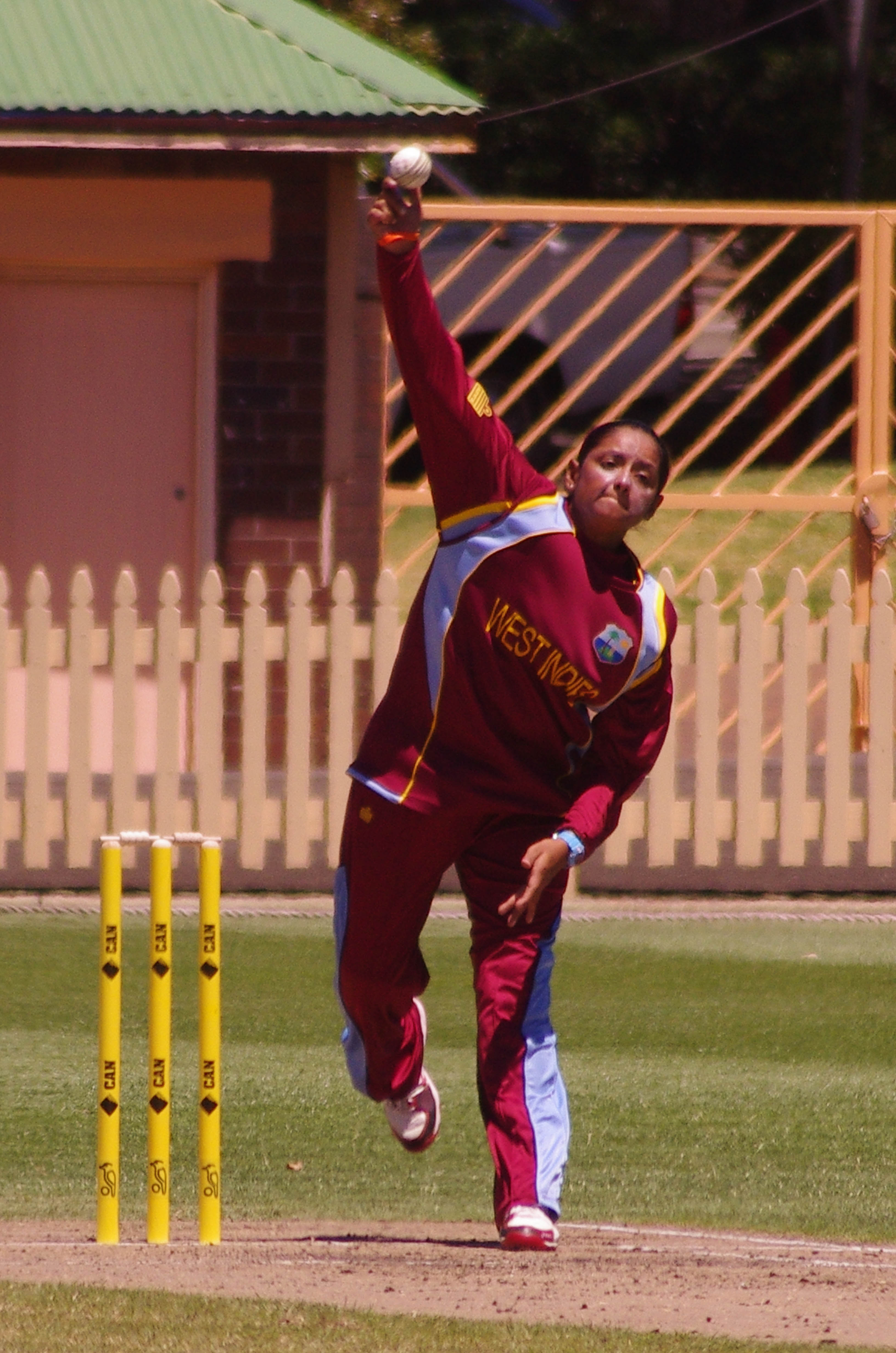
- Mohammed in November 2014

Personal information
- Full name: Anisa Mohammed
- Born: 7 September 1988 (age 38); Sangre Grande, Trinidad and Tobago
- Batting: Right-handed
- Bowling: Right-arm off break
- Role: Bowler

International information
- National side: West Indies (2003–2022)
- ODI debut (cap 51): 26 July 2003 v Japan
- Last ODI: 30 March 2022 v Australia
- T20I debut (cap 3): 27 June 2008 v Ireland
- Last T20I: 4 September 2021 v South Africa

Domestic team information
- Years: Team
- 2003–present: Trinidad and Tobago
- 2022–present: Trinbago Knight Riders

Career statistics
Competition	WODI	WT20I	WLA	WT20
Matches	141	117	173	139
Runs scored	566	152	720	256
Batting average	9.27	7.23	10.43	9.81
100s/50s	0/0	0/0	0/1	0/0
Top score	31*	20*	66	26*
Balls bowled	6,252	2,373	7,499	2,869
Wickets	180	125	241	153
Bowling average	20.75	17.64	16.76	16.24
5 wickets in innings	6	3	8	3
10 wickets in match	0	0	0	0
Best bowling	7/14	5/10	7/14	5/10
Catches/stumpings	45/–	27/–	52/–	31/–
- Source: CricketArchive, 21 January 2024

Anisa Mohammed (born 7 September 1988) is a Trinidadian cricketer who plays for Trinidad and Tobago, Trinbago Knight Riders and the West Indies. She plays as a right-arm off spin bowler. Since her international debut at 15 years of age she has played in 122 One Day International (WODI) and 111 Twenty20 International (WT20I) matches. Mohammed was the first cricketer, male or female, to take 100 wickets in T20Is. In WODIs, she is currently fifth on the all-time dismissals list with 151 wickets to her name. She was also the first bowler for the West Indies to take 100 wickets in WODIs, and the first for the West Indies to take a hat-trick in a Women's Twenty20 International match. In January 2024, Mohammed announced her retirement from international cricket.

== Early life and education ==
Mohammed was born in Sangre Grande, Trinidad and Tobago, and raised in Maraj Hill, Coalmine, a small village nearby. She has a twin sister, Alisa, and twin brothers, Ashmeed and Ashmeer. Her father, Imtiaz, is a Muslim, and her mother, Leela, a Hindu. Both were keen cricketers: Imtiaz played for a club, and Leela participated in soft-ball cricket at the club level. They also introduced their daughters to the game.

At a young age, Mohammed was appointed captain of her local community team, the MAAAD Rangers, which was formed by her family. She was educated at the Sangre Grande Hindu School, the SWAHA Hindu College and the School of Continuing Studies, Trinidad and Tobago.

After good performances for the local club, she was called up the Trinidad and Tobago women's national cricket team.

== International career ==
=== Debut and earlier years ===
Mohammed made her One Day International debut in the West Indies' group stage match of the 2003 IWCC Trophy against Japan, becoming the 51st player to do so. Taking to field 12 days shy of her 15th birthday, Mohammed took the wicket of Ritsuko Hiroto to the finish the match with figures of 1/4 off her 10 overs.

She was then selected for her first international tour when the West Indies toured India and Pakistan in 2003–04. In the seventh ODI against Pakistan at Asghar Ali Shah Cricket Stadium in Karachi, Mohammed took 2/17 in only her fourth international match. She played in one match for the West Indies during the group stage of the 2005 Women's Cricket World Cup in South Africa against Ireland. Following both the West Indies and the host nation elimination, the teams played three ODIs in Pretoria where she failed to take a wicket in her two matches.

=== Return from hiatus ===
It would be three years until the West Indies played another match due to a lack of funding by the WICB. In June 2008, the West Indies returned to the international arena when they toured Europe. During that tour, the West Indies contested their first Twenty20 International match, where they defeated Ireland by 75 runs. Mohammed played in the match but didn't bat or bowl. Her first wicket in the format would come just four days when the toured moved to the Netherlands in July. Taking figures of 4/20, she collected her first the player of the match award.

The 2009 Women's Cricket World Cup in Australia saw Mohammed play in all three group stage matches and two of the Super Sixes matches. She took a total of four wickets at an average of 34.00 in the tournament where the West Indies finished in fifth place. Following the World Cup, she toured to South Africa where at the Newlands Cricket Ground in Cape Town in the second T20I she took five wickets for just ten runs, becoming only the third player to take a five-wicket haul in women's Twenty20 International cricket.

=== 2010 ICC Women's World Twenty20 ===
In the leadup to the 2010 ICC Women's World Twenty20 hosted by the West Indies in May, Sri Lanka toured the host nation to play two ODIs and three T20Is. In the first ODI at the St Paul's Sporting Complex in St Paul's, Mohammed received her first player of the match in the format. Coming to the crease with the score at 92 for 8 and chasing 133, Mohammed and Shanel Daley put together a 41-run ninth wicket partnership to steer the West Indies to victory with three balls to spare. At the same venue two days later, Mohammed was named captain in place of the absent Merissa Aguilleira for the second ODI. Unfortunately for Mohammed, she could not skipper her side to a series victory with Sri Lanka winning the match by 38 runs and drawing the series 1 all. She went to captain the side again in third and final match of the T20I series. In another player of the match performance, she took four wickets for nine runs, including the final wicket in the penultimate over to win match by 28 runs. In the previous match, Mohammed took figures 4/26 becoming only player to take consecutive four-wicket hauls in women's T20Is.

At the World Twenty20 event, Mohammed played in all three group stage matches and was named player of the match in the West Indies' two run victory over England where she bowled 2/9. Her best figures in the tournament came in final group stage match against Australia where despite taking 3/17 and restricting the Southern Stars to 133, the West Indies were unable to run down the target and lost by nine runs. The West Indies lost their semi final to New Zealand and Mohammed finished the competition with a total of six wickets at an average of 11.83.

Six months later in Potchefstroom, South Africa, Mohammed took part in the 2010 ICC Women's Cricket Challenge – a series of ODIs and T20Is matches contested by the West Indies, South Africa, Pakistan, Sri Lanka, the Netherlands and Ireland. In the ODI series, Mohammed played in all five matches where the West Indies finished second behind South Africa. She secured her second player of the match award in the format with figures of 4/26 in a match where the West Indies comfortably defeated Sri Lanka by nine wickets. In the T20Is series, the West Indies won the final against Sri Lanka with Mohammed taking five wickets across the three matches.

The West Indies finished the season by touring India in January 2011 where Mohammed was the West Indies leading wicket taking in the ODI series with eight and produced the best bowling figures with 4/27 in a series which India won 3–2.

=== Pakistan's tour in 2011 ===
The August–September 2011 Pakistan tour of the West Indies saw Mohammed produce one of the most dominating performances in the women's game. In the opening game of the four match ODI series, Pakistan were rolled for 82 with Mohammed taking 5/5 from her 10 overs – becoming the second West Indian bowler to take five-wicket hauls in a women's ODI match. Two days later, she produced another five-wicket haul, taking four of Pakistan's top six to finish with 5/7. Both of these spells earned her player of the match honours. In the final match she took 4/17 to finish the series with 14 wickets at average of just 3.57, collecting her first player of the series award.

Her great form continued into the 2011 Women's Cricket World Cup Qualifier in Bangladesh two months later. She took her third five-wicket haul against Pakistan in as many matches. She was rested for the pool matches against Japan and Bangladesh before returning for the semi-final match against Sri Lanka where she took 3/29 in 6 overs. Mohammed produced one of the most memorable cricketing performances in the final against Pakistan where she took 7 wickets for 14 runs – the fourth best bowling figures in history of women's ODI cricket. Winning by 130 runs, the West Indies finished the tournament undefeated and qualified for the 2013 Women's Cricket World Cup. She finished 2011 with 37 ODI wickets, the most in a calendar year, overtaking Australia's Charmaine Mason long standing record set in 2000. (Note: Suné Luus of South Africa equalled the record of 37 wickets in 2016.)

=== 2018 and 2020 World Twenty20 ===
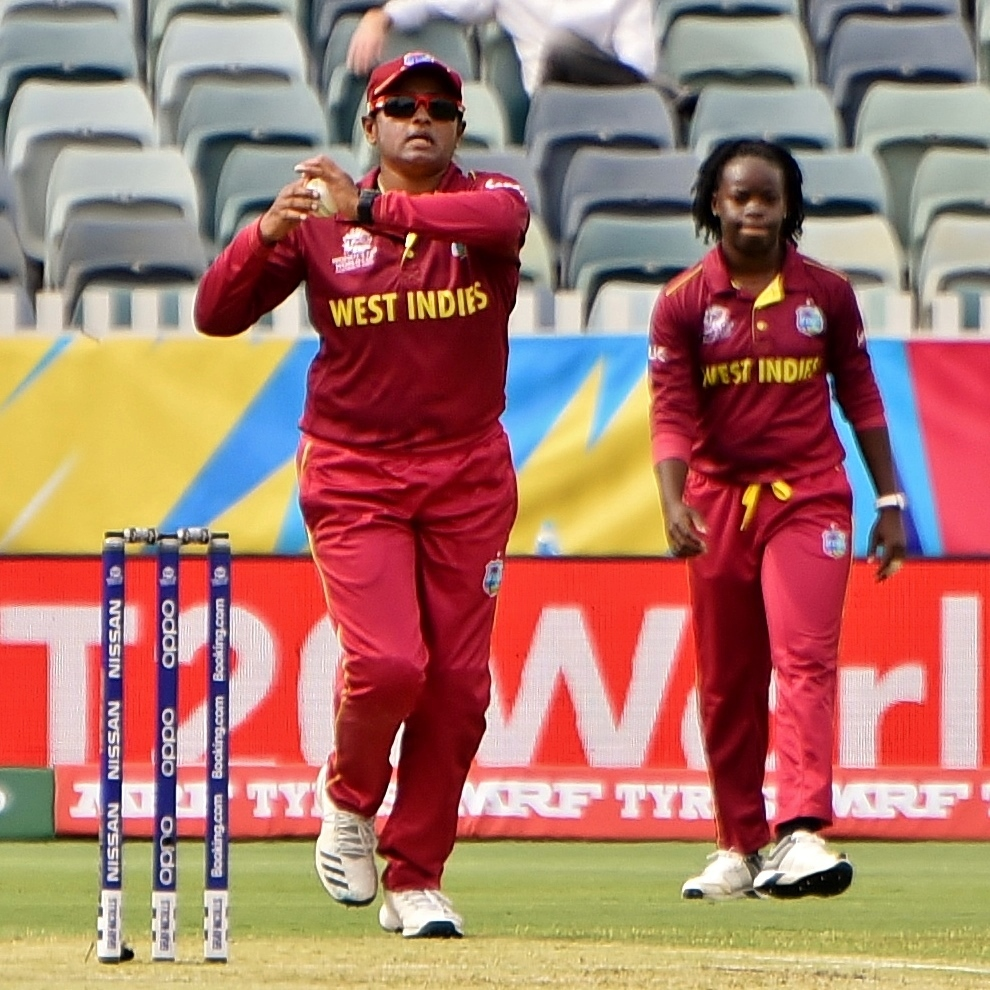
Mohammed bowling for the West Indies during the 2020 ICC Women's T20 World Cup

In October 2018, Cricket West Indies (CWI) awarded her a women's contract for the 2018–19 season. Later the same month, she was named in the West Indies' squad for the 2018 ICC Women's World Twenty20 tournament in the West Indies. Ahead of the tournament, she was named as one of the players to watch. In January 2020, she was named in West Indies' squad for the 2020 ICC Women's T20 World Cup in Australia.

In October 2021, she was named as the vice-captain of the West Indies team for the 2021 Women's Cricket World Cup Qualifier tournament in Zimbabwe. In February 2022, she was named as the vice-captain of the West Indies team for the 2022 Women's Cricket World Cup in New Zealand.

== Five-wicket hauls ==
Mohammed has taken a total of seven five-wicket hauls in women's international cricket, five in ODIs and two in T20Is. She is the only player to achieve either of these feats.

=== One Day Internationals ===
No	Opponent	Venue	Date	Figures	Result	Ref
1	Pakistan	Arnos Vale Stadium, Kingstown	28 August 2011	5/5 (10 overs)	Won by 8 wickets	
2	Pakistan	Arnos Vale Stadium, Kingstown	30 August 2011	5/7 (10 overs)	Won by 89 runs	
3	Pakistan	Krira Shikkha Protisthan No 2 Ground, Dhaka	17 November 2011	5/26 (10 overs)	Won by 8 wickets	
4	Pakistan	Sher-e-Bangla National Cricket Stadium, Dhaka	26 November 2011	7/14 (8.3 overs)	Won by 130 runs	
5	Sri Lanka	Kensington Oval, Bridgetown	25 April 2012	5/34 (9.3 overs)	Won by 88 runs	

=== Twenty20 Internationals ===
No	Opponent	Venue	Date	Figures	Result	Ref
1	South Africa	Newlands Cricket Ground, Cape Town	26 October 2009	5/10 (4 overs)	Won by 13 runs	
2	New Zealand	Kensington Oval, Bridgetown	14 October 2013	5/12 (4 overs)	Won by 23 runs	
3	South Africa	Brian Lara Cricket Academy, San Fernando	28 September 2018	5/24 (4 overs)	Won by 9 wickets	

== Awards ==
Mohammed has been named the Trinidad and Tobago Women's Cricketer of the Year on three occasions, in 2003, 2008 and 2010. At the inaugural Trinidad and Tobago Spirit of Sports Awards in 2011, she was named the most consistent performer, the breakthrough athlete and was recognised as having the record breaking performance of the year.

Mohammed has been named player of the match ten times during her ODI career and five times during her T20I career. She was also named the player of the series twice, both in home ODI series.

== Retirement ==
In January 2024, Mohammed announced her retirement from international cricket, along with three other West Indies women cricketers, Shakera Selman and twin sisters Kycia and Kyshona Knight.
