= Dharshani Dharmasiri =

Sri Lankan cricketer (born 1986)

Personal information
- Full name: Dehigampala Gamaralalage Dharshani Rukshala Dharmasiri
- Born: 5 April 1986 (age 40); Karawanella, Sabaragamuwa, Sri Lanka

International information
- National side: Sri Lanka
- ODI debut (cap 46): 15 November 2010 v England
- Last ODI: 29 April 2012 v West Indies
- T20I debut (cap 23): 1 May 2012 v West Indies
- Last T20I: 7 May 2012 v West Indies
- Source: Cricinfo, 14 June 2021

Dharshani Dharmasiri (born 5 April 1986) is a Sri Lankan cricketer who played for the Sri Lanka women's cricket team. She made her Women's One Day International cricket (WODI) debut for Sri Lanka against England Women on 15 November 2010. She made her Women's Twenty20 International cricket (WT20I) debut against the West Indies Women on 1 May 2012. In May 2013, she was one of sixteen players to be named in a development squad by Sri Lanka Cricket.
