= Jeff Evans (umpire) =

Welsh cricket umpire (1954–2025)

Personal information
- Full name: Jeffrey Howard Evans
- Born: 7 August 1954; Llanelly, Carmarthenshire, Wales
- Died: 20 April 2025 (aged 70); Drefach, Carmarthenshire, Wales
- Role: Umpire

Umpiring information
- WODIs umpired: 5 (2002–2014)
- WT20Is umpired: 3 (2011–2018)
- FC umpired: 258 (1999–2020)
- LA umpired: 225 (1999–2020)
- T20 umpired: 157 (2003–2020)
- Source: Cricinfo, 3 January 2019

Jeffrey Howard Evans (7 August 1954 – 20 April 2025) was a Welsh cricket umpire who stood in over 200 first-class and List A matches after being named to the ECB Umpires List in 1999. He stood in over 100 Twenty20 matches since the inception of the format in 2003. Evans also officiated in four Women's ODIs between 2002 and 2014, as well as the match between India Women and New Zealand Women in the Women's T20 Quadrangular Series in England in 2011. Born in Llanelli, Carmarthenshire, he also umpired matches in the ICL 20-20 Indian Championship 2007–08. Evans died in Drefach, Carmarthenshire on 20 April 2025, at the age of 70.
