= Rebeca Vandort =

Sri Lankan cricketer (born 1994)

Personal information
- Full name: Rebeca Supipi Vandort
- Born: 27 January 1994 (age 32); Colombo, Sri Lanka
- Batting: Right-handed
- Role: Wicket-keeper

International information
- National side: Sri Lanka
- ODI debut (cap 57): 28 October 2013 v South Africa
- Last ODI: 24 March 2018 v Pakistan
- T20I debut (cap 33): 2 November 2013 v South Africa
- Last T20I: 25 September 2018 v India
- Source: Cricinfo, 25 September 2018

Rebeca Supipi Vandort (born 27 January 1994) is a Sri Lankan cricketer. She is a right-handed batter and wicket-keeper. In October 2018, she was named in Sri Lanka's squad for the 2018 ICC Women's World Twenty20 tournament in the West Indies.
