= Shilpa Gupta (cricketer) =

Indian cricketer (born 1989)

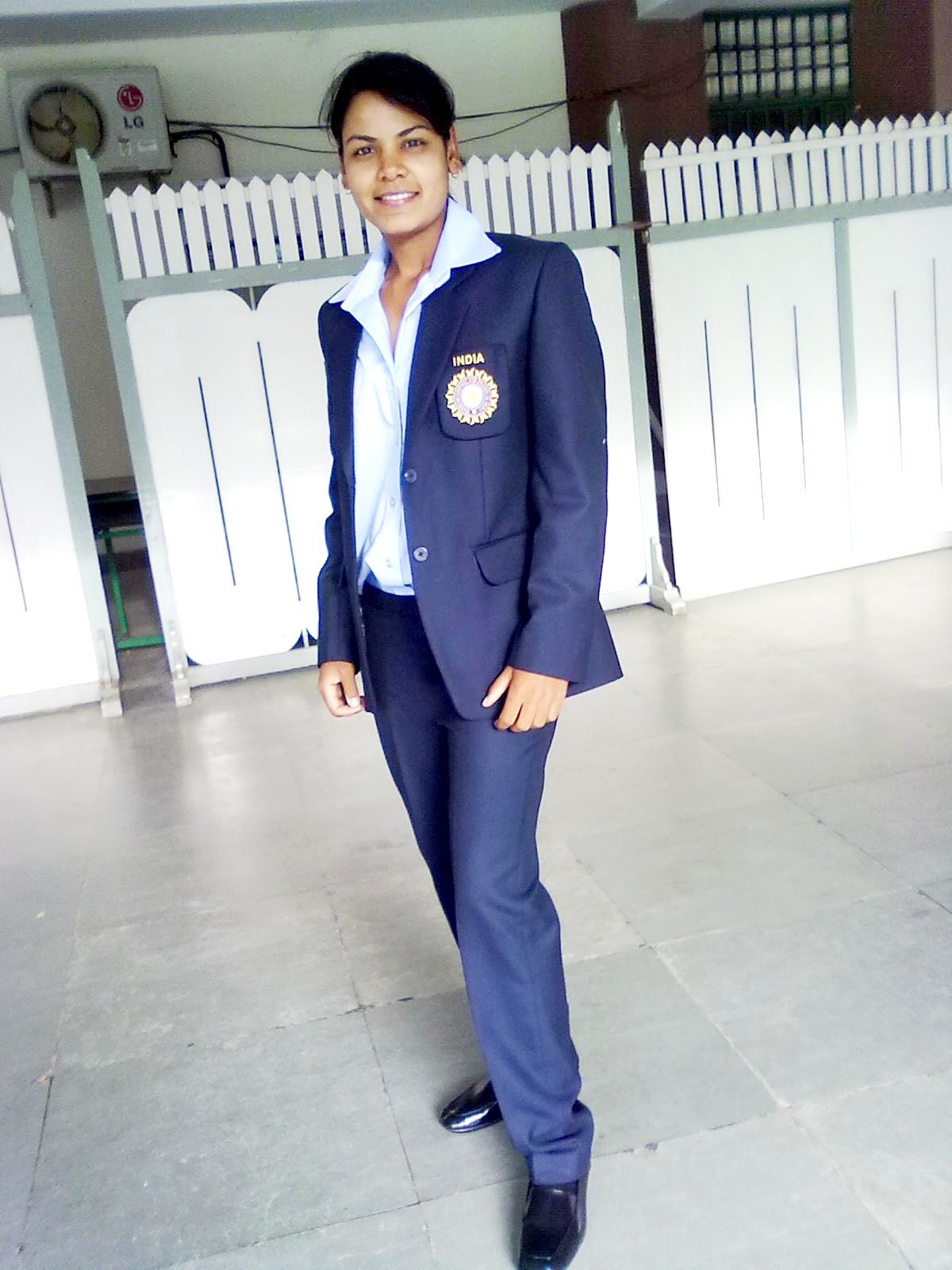
- Shilpa Gupta from Indian Women's Cricket Team

Personal information
- Born: 24 February 1989 (age 37); Delhi, India
- Batting: Right-handed
- Bowling: Right-arm legbreak
- Role: All-rounder

International information
- National side: India
- Only ODI (cap 98): 5 July 2011 v New Zealand

Domestic team information
- Years: Team
- 2006–present: Delhi Women

Career statistics
Competition	WODI
Matches	1
Runs scored	4
Batting average	4.00
100s/50s	0/0
Top score	4
Balls bowled	30
Wickets	0
Bowling average	–
5 wickets in innings	–
10 wickets in match	–
Best bowling	–
Catches/stumpings	0/–
- Source: Cricinfo, 5 May 2020

Shilpa Gupta (born 24 February 1989) is an Indian cricketer. She plays for Delhi women's cricket team in domestic matches.

== Early life ==
Shilpa Gupta was born in Rohini, Delhi. Her father Dayanand Gupta is a property dealer and her mother Swarna Gupta is a housewife. She did her schooling from SKV Prashant Vihar and attended Kamla Nehru College, Delhi University. She has also pursued her master's degree from Himachal Pradesh University.

== Professional career ==
Shilpa Gupta was fond of playing cricket since childhood. Her father has narrated that she used to play cricket with her brother on the terrace since childhood. She rose to fame after being selected from the Delhi University team, North Zone team and earning a 98th cap for the India International Women team.

== Life after cricket ==
Shilpa Gupta left cricket in 2012. In 2013, she was given a government job by Ministry of Defence, Govt of India. She now works as a Senior Auditor (Civil) in Indian Air Force, in Delhi.
