= Chamika Bandara =

Sri Lankan cricketer (born 1980)

Personal information
- Born: 13 November 1980 (age 45); Anuradhapura, Sri Lanka

Career statistics
Competition	WODI	WT20I
Matches	1	2
Runs scored	3	10
Batting average	3.00	5.00
100s/50s	0/0	0/0
Top score	3	5
Balls bowled	–	12
Wickets	–	0
Bowling average	–	–
5 wickets in innings	–	–
10 wickets in match	–	–
Best bowling	–	–
Catches/stumpings	0/0	1/0

Chamika Bandara Madushani (born 13 November 1980) is a former Sri Lankan cricketer. She has represented Sri Lanka in two T20Is and in a single ODI match.
