= Subrina Munroe =

West Indian cricketer (born 1985)

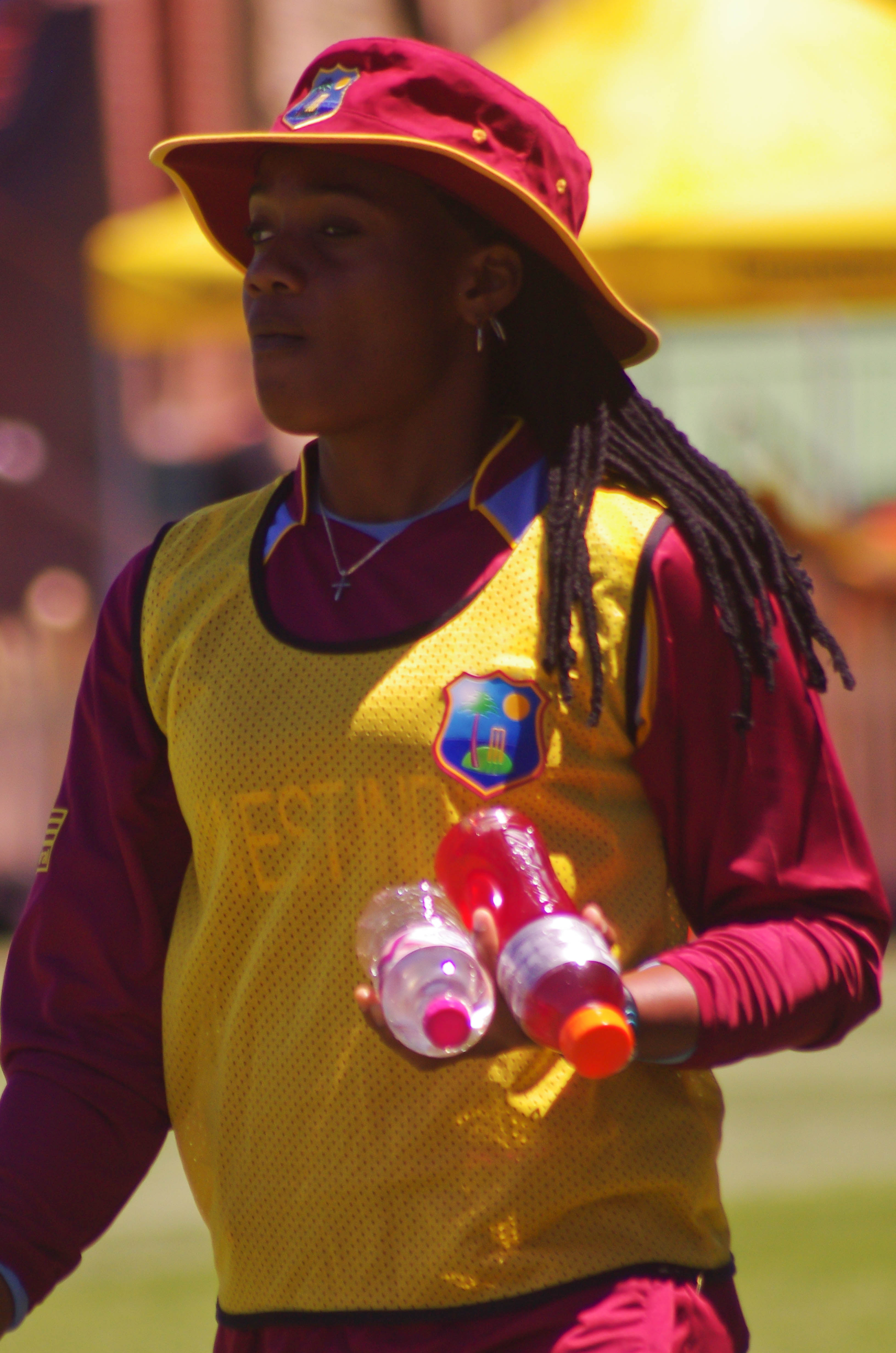
- Munroe in 2014

Personal information
- Full name: Subrina Latoya Munroe
- Born: 11 June 1985 (age 41); Georgetown, Guyana
- Batting: Right-handed
- Bowling: Right-arm medium
- Role: Bowler

International information
- National side: West Indies (2010–2015)
- ODI debut (cap 71): 6 October 2010 v Netherlands
- Last ODI: 18 November 2014 v Australia
- T20I debut (cap 25): 16 October 2010 v Netherlands
- Last T20I: 25 May 2015 v Sri Lanka

Domestic team information
- Years: Team
- 2003–2018: Guyana

Career statistics
Competition	WODI	WT20I	WLA	WT20
Matches	23	21	53	39
Runs scored	9	9	111	20
Batting average	4.50	9.00	6.16	10.00
100s/50s	0/0	0/0	0/0	0/0
Top score	5	6	22	10*
Balls bowled	876	309	1,751	564
Wickets	11	13	44	22
Bowling average	51.54	22.30	22.65	22.27
5 wickets in innings	0	0	1	0
10 wickets in match	0	0	0	0
Best bowling	3/15	2/10	6/24	2/3
Catches/stumpings	7/–	4/–	12/–	6/–
- Source: CricketArchive, 31 May 2021

Subrina Munroe (born 11 June 1985) is a Guyanese former cricketer who played as a right-arm medium bowler. She appeared in 23 One Day Internationals and 21 Twenty20 Internationals for the West Indies between 2010 and 2015. She played domestic cricket for Guyana.
