= Suwini de Alwis =

Sri Lankan cricketer (born 1975)

Personal information
- Born: 17 May 1975 (age 51); Kandy, Sri Lanka
- Batting: Left-handed

International information
- National side: Sri Lanka
- Source: Cricinfo, 12 April 2014

Suwini de Alwis (born 17 May 1975) is a Sri Lankan former cricketer.

A left-handed batter and a slow left-arm orthodox bowler, she made her One Day International debut against India in March 2005 and played her last ODI against South Africa in November 2011.
