= Lasanthi Madushani =

Sri Lankan cricketer (born 1987)

Personal information
- Full name: Heenatigala Madhinage Lasanthi Madushani
- Born: 12 September 1987 (age 39); Colombo, Sri Lanka
- Batting: Right-handed
- Bowling: Right arm fast

International information
- National side: Sri Lanka
Medal record
Representing Sri Lanka
Women's Cricket
Asian Games
Bronze medal – third place	2014 Incheon	Team
- Source: Cricinfo, 27 September 2016

Lasanthi Madushani (born 12 September 1987) is a Sri Lankan cricketer who plays for Sri Lanka's women's cricket team. A right-handed batter and a right-arm fast bowler, she made her One Day International (ODI) debut against the Netherlands on 7 October 2010. Her Women's Twenty20 International (WT20I) came a week later, against Pakistan on 14 October 2010.
