= Anagha Deshpande =

Indian cricketer (born 1985)

Personal information
- Born: 19 November 1985 (age 40); Solapur, Maharashtra, India
- Batting: Right-handed
- Role: Wicket-keeper

International information
- National side: India
- ODI debut (cap 88): 9 May 2008 v Pakistan
- Last ODI: 10 April 2013 v Bangladesh
- T20I debut (cap 25): 23 June 2011 v Australia
- Last T20I: 26 January 2014 v Sri Lanka

Career statistics
Competition	WODI	WT20I
Matches	20	7
Runs scored	361	236
Batting average	19.00	47.20
100s/50s	0/0	0/2
Top score	47	67*
Catches/stumpings	5/9	2/5
- Source: CricketArchive, 1 May 2020

Anagha Deshpande (born 19 November 1985) is a cricketer who has played in 20 women's One Day Internationals and seven Twenty20 internationals for India. She has played for India Blue Women, India Under-21s Women, and India Women cricket teams. She was born at Solapur in Maharashtra.

In June 2020, she was appointed as coach by Uttarakhand Cricket Association (UCA) of Uttarakhand women's U-16 and U-19 teams.
