= Snehal Pradhan =

Indian cricketer

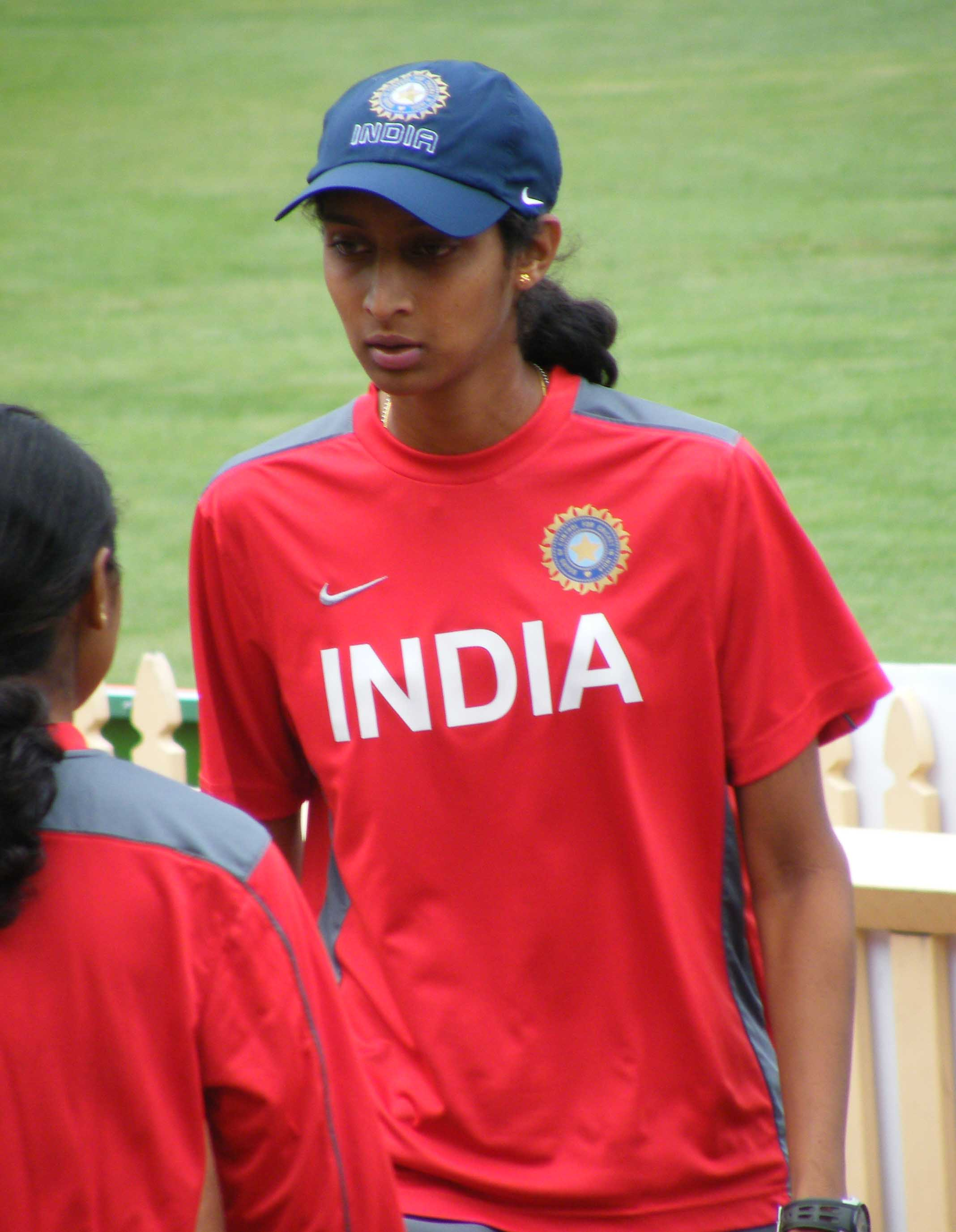

Personal information
- Born: 18 March 1986 (age 40); Pune, India
- Batting: Right-handed
- Bowling: Right-arm medium-fast
- Role: Batter

International information
- National side: India
- ODI debut (cap 89): 9 May 2008 v Pakistan
- Last ODI: 30 June 2011 v England
- T20I debut (cap 27): 23 June 2011 v Australia
- Last T20I: 27 June 2011 v New Zealand

Career statistics
Competition	ODI	T20I
Matches	6	4
Runs scored	13	2
Batting average	13.00	2.00
100s/50s	0/0	0/0
Top score	6*	2*
Balls bowled	216	67
Wickets	5	6
Bowling average	27.40	10.66
5 wickets in innings	0	0
10 wickets in match	0	0
Best bowling	3/21	3/30
Catches/stumpings	1/0	0/–
- Source: ESPNcricinfo, 2 May 2020

Snehal Pradhan (born 18 March 1986) is a former international cricketer who has played in six women's One Day Internationals and four T20 internationals for India. She now works as a freelance sports journalist, broadcaster and YouTuber. She was born at Pune.

== Career ==
=== Playing career ===
Snehal Pradhan was a right-arm fast medium bowler who played more than 100 List A matches for Maharashtra Cricket Association between 2005 and 2016 under the BCCI. She also represented Maharashtra State Women's Cricket Association from 2001, under Women's Cricket Association of India before the BCCI took over Women's Cricket in 2005. She was a part of the India Under-21 team fielded by Women's Cricket Association of India that toured Pakistan in 2005. She made her debut for India in 2008 and played 6 ODI and 4 T20I matches. She was a medium pacer who played with Jhulan Goswami. Snehal Pradhan was reported for suspected illegal bowling action by the on-field umpires during an ODI against England in Derby on 30 June 2011. Her bowling action was declared illegal by the ICC after conducting tests at the School of Sport Science, Exercise and Health in Perth. She was henceforth suspended from bowling. However, her action was cleared by the ICC in February 2012 and she was allowed to resume bowling at the international level.

She played her last match in June 2015 for India A against New Zealand, before retiring on 20 October 2015.

=== Post-retirement ===
Since retirement, Pradhan has been working in the media as a freelance sports journalist, writing for publications like Firstpost, ESPN Cricinfo, Scroll, Cricbuzz, Economic Times and Wisden India. Since November 2016, she has been posting videos on her YouTube Channel 'Cricket With Snehal' sharing cricket tips, gear reviews, and coaching advice. She has appeared in a pre-match interview before the Women's IPL Challenge 2019.

Snehal has been selected for providing commentary at the IPL's 14th season in 2021 for the Marathi language broadcast.
