= Yashoda Mendis =

Sri Lankan cricketer (born 1986)

Personal information
- Full name: Batawalage Yashoda Avanthika Mendis
- Born: 15 September 1986 (age 40); Balapitiya, Sri Lanka
- Batting: Right-handed
- Bowling: Right-arm medium

International information
- National side: Sri Lanka
- ODI debut (cap 48): 26 April 2011 v Pakistan
- Last ODI: 9 October 2019 v Australia
- T20I debut (cap 22): 24 April 2011 v Netherlands
- Last T20I: 30 September 2019 v Australia
Medal record
Representing Sri Lanka
Women's Cricket
Asian Games
Bronze medal – third place	2014 Incheon	Team
- Source: Cricinfo, 9 October 2019

Batawalage Yashoda Avanthika Mendis (born 15 September 1986), known as Yashoda Mendis, is a Sri Lankan cricketer.

She made her Women's One Day International and Twenty20 International debut in April 2011, against Pakistan and the Netherlands, respectively. She was the leading run-scorer for Sri Lanka in the 2018 Women's Twenty20 Asia Cup, with 130 runs in five matches.

She was part of Sri Lanka's squad for the 2018 ICC Women's World Twenty20 tournament in the West Indies, where Sri Lanka were eliminated in the group stage.
