= Samantha Lobatto =

Indian cricketer (born 1988)

Personal information
- Full name: Samantha Luzia Joseph Lobatto
- Born: 23 September 1988 (age 38); Mumbai, Maharashtra
- Batting: Right-handed
- Bowling: Right-arm medium
- Role: Wicketkeeper

International information
- National side: India
- ODI debut (cap 94): 18 January 2011 v West Indies
- Last ODI: 5 July 2011 v New Zealand
- T20I debut (cap 23): 22 January 2011 v West Indies
- Last T20I: 24 January 2011 v West Indies

Career statistics
Competition	ODI	T20I
Matches	3	3
Runs scored	1	3
Batting average	–	–
100s/50s	0/0	0/0
Top score	1*	3*
Catches/stumpings	2/2	0/7
- Source: ESPNcricinfo, 7 May 2020

Samantha Luzia Joseph Lobatto (born 23 September 1988) is an Indian cricketer. She is a right-handed batter and right-arm off-break bowler who normally keeps wicket. She played 3 ODIs and 3 T20I for India women's cricket team all in 2011.
