= Sripali Weerakkody =

Sri Lankan cricketer (born 1986)

Personal information
- Full name: Sripali Shiromala Weerakkody
- Born: 7 January 1986 (age 40); Kirindiwela, Sri Lanka
- Batting: Left-handed
- Bowling: Right-arm medium
- Role: Bowler

International information
- National side: Sri Lanka
- ODI debut (cap 37): 1 December 2006 v Pakistan
- Last ODI: 16 September 2018 v India
- T20I debut (cap 11): 12 June 2009 v Pakistan
- Last T20I: 14 November 2018 v Bangladesh

Domestic team information
- Years: Team
- 2003–2007: Kandyan Ladies Cricket Club
- 2008–2009: Slimline Sports Club Women
- 2009–present: Colts Cricket Club Women

Career statistics
Competition	ODI	T20I
Matches	89	58
Runs scored	722	209
Batting average	12.66	7.20
100s/50s	0	0/0
Top score	29*	17
Balls bowled	3,046	909
Wickets	58	31
Bowling average	35.62	29.32
5 wickets in innings	0	0
10 wickets in match	0	0
Best bowling	3/19	3/23
Catches/stumpings	13/0	1/0
Medal record
Representing Sri Lanka
Women's Cricket
Asian Games
Bronze medal – third place	2014 Incheon	Team
- Source: ESPNcricinfo, 22 July 2020

Sripali Shiromala Weerakkody (born 7 January 1986) is a Sri Lankan former cricketer who played in 89 Women's One Day Internationals and 58 Women's Twenty20 Internationals for her country. On 20 August 2007, she broke the record for the highest score in Women's List-A cricket, when she scored 271* for Kandyan Ladies Cricket Club against Pushpadana Ladies. She played as a medium-pace bowler. Weerakkody was a member of Sri Lanka's 2014 Asian Games bronze medal-winning team.

In October 2018, she was named in Sri Lanka's squad for the 2018 ICC Women's World Twenty20 tournament in the West Indies. In July 2020, she announced her retirement from international cricket.
