= Shanel Daley =

Cricketer

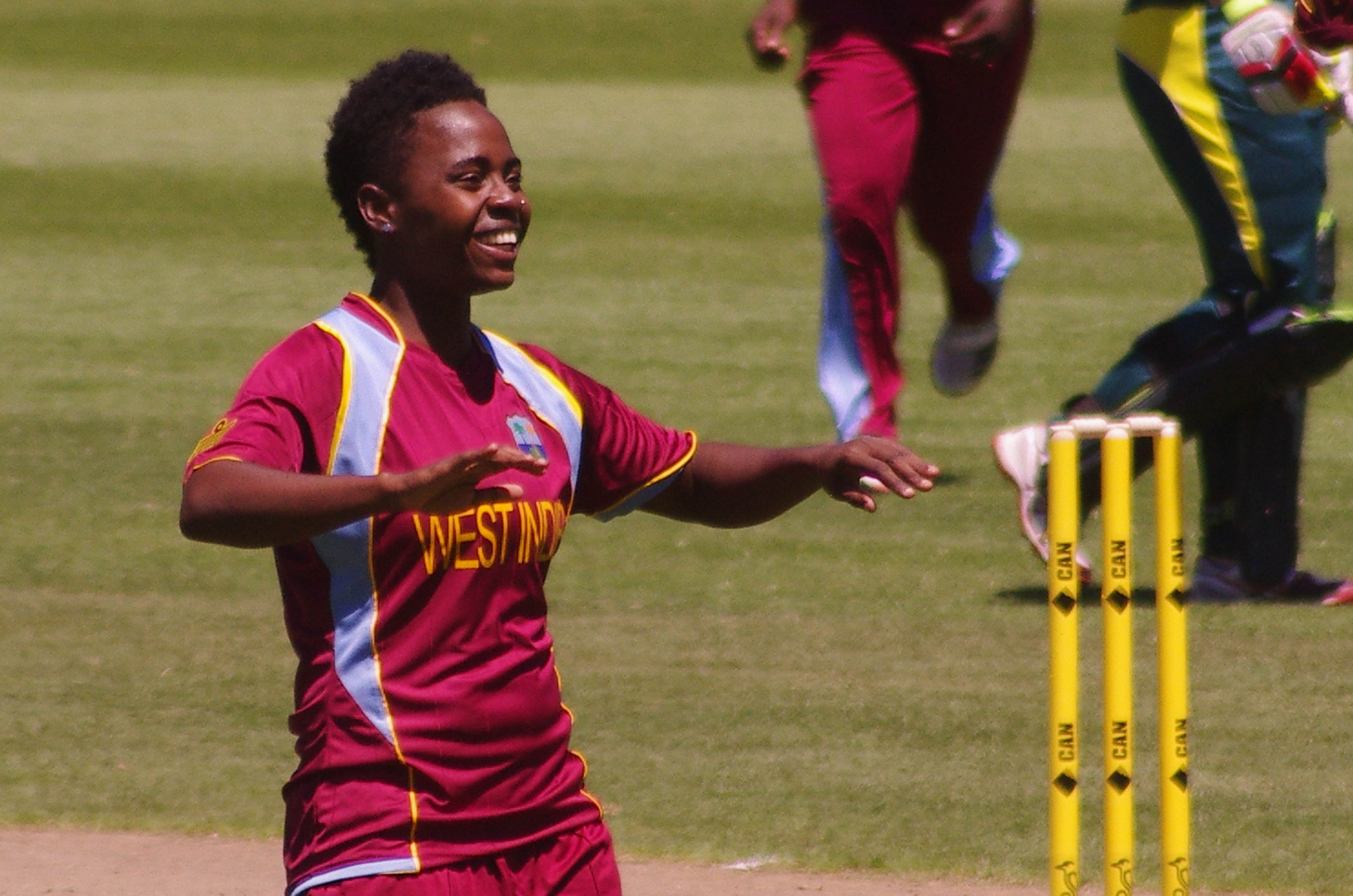
- Daley in 2014

Personal information
- Full name: Shanel Francine Daley
- Born: 25 December 1988 (age 37); Jamaica
- Batting: Left-handed
- Bowling: Left-arm medium
- Role: All-rounder
- Relatives: Aaron Daley (father)

International information
- National side: West Indies (2008–2017)
- ODI debut (cap 66): 5 November 2008 v Sri Lanka
- Last ODI: 11 July 2017 v Pakistan
- ODI shirt no.: 31
- T20I debut (cap 18): 13 June 2009 v New Zealand
- Last T20I: 9 November 2014 v Australia

Domestic team information
- Years: Team
- 2008–2017: Jamaica
- 2013: Staffordshire

Career statistics
| Competition | WODI | WT20I | WLA | WT20 |
|---|---|---|---|---|
| Matches | 70 | 68 | 101 | 86 |
| Runs scored | 1,001 | 464 | 1,538 | 658 |
| Batting average | 19.62 | 12.21 | 20.78 | 12.90 |
| 100s/50s | 0/3 | 0/0 | 0/6 | 0/0 |
| Top score | 63 | 48 | 63 | 48 |
| Balls bowled | 2977 | 1,363 | 4,201 | 1,748 |
| Wickets | 73 | 72 | 130 | 99 |
| Bowling average | 23.30 | 15.45 | 16.92 | 13.47 |
| 5 wickets in innings | 0 | 1 | 2 | 2 |
| 10 wickets in match | 0 | 0 | 0 | 0 |
| Best bowling | 4/29 | 5/15 | 8/7 | 5/11 |
| Catches/stumpings | 23/– | 15/– | 30/– | 23/– |
- Source: CricketArchive, 31 May 2021

Shanel Francine Daley (born 25 December 1988) is a Jamaican former cricketer who played as a left-arm medium bowler and left-handed batter. She appeared in 70 One Day Internationals and 68 Twenty20 Internationals for the West Indies between 2008 and 2017. She played domestic cricket for Jamaica, as well as spending one season with Staffordshire.

Daley is the daughter of Jamaican former fast bowler Aaron Daley. She was diagnosed with clinical depression following the 2017 Women's Cricket World Cup; after her recovery she returned to club cricket in 2019.
