= 2022–23 CSA Women's Provincial T20 Competition =

South African women's domestic cricket season

- Dates: 25 September 2022 – 2 April 2023
- Administrator(s): Cricket South Africa
- Cricket format: Twenty20
- Tournament format(s): Round robin
- Champions: Central Gauteng (1st title)
- Participants: 16
- Matches: 50

The 2022–23 CSA Women's Provincial T20 Competition was the 10th edition of South Africa's provincial Twenty20 cricket tournament. The tournament ran from September 2022 to April 2023, with 16 teams competing in three divisions. Western Province were the defending champions.

Central Gauteng won the competition, topping the Top 6 table.

== Competition format ==
The 16 teams were divided into three divisions: a top division named "Top 6", and two lower divisions, Pools A and B. Teams in Pools A and B played each other team in their group once in a round-robin format, whilst teams in the Top 6 league play each other team in their group twice. Matches were played using a Twenty20 format. The winner of the Top 6 league was crowned the Champions.

The tournament ran concurrently with the 2022–23 CSA Women's Provincial Programme, with matches played either the day before or day after the corresponding encounter between two teams in the one-day tournament. To maintain this link for the following season, promotion and relegation in the Provincial T20 Competition is determined by standings in the Provincial League.

The groups worked on a points system with positions being based on the total points. Points were awarded as follows:

Win: 4 points.
Tie: 3 points.
Loss: 0 points.
Abandoned/No Result: 2 points.
Bonus Point: 1 bonus point available per match.

== Teams ==
Top 6	Central Gauteng	Northerns	KwaZulu-Natal Coastal	North West	South Western Districts	Western Province
Pool A	Boland	Border	Eastern Province	Free State	Kei	
Pool B	Easterns	KwaZulu-Natal Inland	Limpopo	Mpumalanga	Northern Cape	

== Tables ==
As of 9 December 2022

=== Top 6 ===
Team	Pld	W	L	T	NR	A	BP	Pts	NRR
Central Gauteng (C)	10	8	2	0	0	0	4	36	+0.830
Western Province	10	7	3	0	0	0	4	32	+1.112
South Western Districts	10	6	4	0	0	0	2	26	–0.188
KwaZulu-Natal Coastal	10	4	5	0	0	1	1	19	–0.410
North West	10	2	8	0	0	0	2	10	–0.549
Northerns	10	2	7	0	0	1	0	10	–0.966

=== Pool A ===
Team	Pld	W	L	T	NR	A	BP	Pts	NRR
Free State	4	3	1	0	0	0	3	15	+3.522
Boland	4	3	1	0	0	0	2	14	+1.390
Border	4	2	2	0	0	0	2	10	–1.151
Eastern Province	4	2	2	0	0	0	1	9	–0.169
Kei	4	0	4	0	0	0	0	0	–3.055

=== Pool B ===
Team	Pld	W	L	T	NR	A	BP	Pts	NRR
Northern Cape	4	3	1	0	0	0	3	15	+1.561
Easterns	4	3	0	0	0	1	0	14	+0.636
Mpumalanga	4	1	1	0	0	2	0	8	–0.864
KwaZulu-Natal Inland	4	1	2	0	0	1	0	6	–0.558
Limpopo	4	0	4	0	0	0	0	0	–1.197
