= 2017–18 CSA Women's Provincial T20 Competition =

South African women's domestic cricket season

- Dates: 15 October 2017 – 25 February 2018
- Administrator(s): Cricket South Africa
- Cricket format: Twenty20
- Tournament format(s): Round-robin divisions
- Champions: Western Province (5th title)
- Participants: 16
- Matches: 35
- Most runs: Stacy Lackay (207); Susan Benade (207)
- Most wickets: Nicolien Janse van Rensburg (7); Marnazelle Rabie (7); Evodia Yekile (7); Tshegofatso Rampai (7)

The 2017–18 CSA Women's Provincial T20 Competition was the 6th edition of South Africa's provincial Twenty20 cricket tournament. It ran from October 2017 to February 2018, with 16 provincial teams taking part. Western Province won the tournament, claiming their fifth T20 title and fourth in a row.

== Competition format ==
The 16 teams were divided into three divisions: a top division named "Top 6", and two lower divisions, Pools A and B. Teams played each other team in their group once in a round-robin format, with matches played using a Twenty20 format. The winner of the Top 6 group was crowned Champions.

The tournament ran concurrently with the 2017–18 CSA Women's Provincial League, with matches played either the day before or day after the corresponding encounter between two teams in the one-day tournament. To maintain this link for the following season, promotion and relegation in the Provincial T20 Competition was determined by standings in the Provincial League.

The groups worked on a points system with positions being based on the total points. Points were awarded as follows:

Win: 4 points
Tie: 3 points
Loss: 0 points.
Abandoned/No Result: 2 points.
Bonus Point: 1 bonus point available per match.

== Teams ==
Top 6	Border	Free State	Gauteng	Northerns	North West	Western Province
Pool A	Boland	Eastern Province	Northern Cape	Kei	South Western Districts	
Pool B	Easterns	KwaZulu-Natal	KwaZulu-Natal Inland	Limpopo	Mpumalanga	

== Standings ==
=== Top 6 ===
Team	Pld	W	L	T	NR	A	BP	Pts	NRR
Western Province (C)	5	4	1	0	0	0	3	19	+1.535
North West	5	4	1	0	0	0	2	18	+0.670
Northerns	5	3	2	0	0	0	1	13	+0.662
Gauteng	5	2	3	0	0	0	1	9	–0.091
Border	5	1	4	0	0	0	0	4	–1.346
Free State	5	1	4	0	0	0	0	4	–1.467

=== Pool A ===
Team	Pld	W	L	T	NR	A	BP	Pts	NRR
Eastern Province	4	4	0	0	0	0	2	18	+1.501
Boland	4	3	1	0	0	0	3	15	+1.345
South Western Districts	4	2	2	0	0	0	1	9	+0.841
Northern Cape	4	1	3	0	0	0	1	5	+0.597
Kei	4	0	4	0	0	0	0	0	–4.206

=== Pool B ===
Team	Pld	W	L	T	NR	A	BP	Pts	NRR
KwaZulu-Natal	4	4	0	0	0	0	4	20	+4.054
Easterns	4	2	1	1	0	0	2	13	+0.268
Mpumalanga	4	1	2	1	0	0	0	7	–1.188
Limpopo	4	1	3	0	0	0	1	5	–1.239
KwaZulu-Natal Inland	4	1	3	0	0	0	1	5	–1.607
