= 2016–17 CSA Women's Provincial League =

South African women's domestic cricket season

- Dates: 8 October 2016 – 3 April 2017
- Administrator(s): Cricket South Africa
- Cricket format: 50 over
- Tournament format(s): Round robin and knockout
- Champions: North West (1st title)
- Participants: 16
- Matches: 55
- Most runs: Lizelle Lee (456)
- Most wickets: Shabnim Ismail (18)

The 2016–17 CSA Women's Provincial League was the 22nd edition of South Africa's provincial one-day cricket tournament. It ran from October 2016 to April 2017, with 16 provincial teams taking part. North West beat Gauteng in the final to win their first one-day title.

== Competition format ==
The 16 teams were divided into three divisions: a top division named "Top 6", and two lower divisions, Pools A and B. Teams played each other team in their group once in a round-robin format, with matches played using a one day format with 50 overs per side.

All six teams in the Top 6 group progressed to a further round of groups, joined by the best-placed team across Pool A and B. The seven teams were divided into two groups, playing each other team in their group once. The top four teams from this stage progressed to the semi-finals, whilst the bottom three teams were joined by the other Pool stage group winner in a series of placing matches. The top six placed sides in these matches qualified for the next season's Top 6 league.

The tournament ran concurrently with the 2016–17 CSA Women's Provincial T20 Competition, with matches played either the day before or day after the corresponding encounter between two teams in the T20 tournament. To maintain this link for the following season, promotion and relegation in the Provincial T20 Competition was determined by standings in the Provincial League.

The groups worked on a points system with positions being based on the total points. Points were awarded as follows:

Win: 4 points
Tie: 3 points
Loss: 0 points.
Abandoned/No Result: 2 points.
Bonus Point: 1 bonus point available per match.

== Teams ==
Top 6	Boland	Eastern Province	Free State	Gauteng	North West	Western Province
Pool A	Border	Kei	KwaZulu-Natal	KwaZulu-Natal Inland	South Western Districts	
Pool B	Easterns	Limpopo	Mpumalanga	Northern Cape	Northerns	

== Group stages ==
=== First round ===
==== Top 6 ====
Team	Pld	W	L	T	NR	A	BP	Pts	NRR
Western Province	5	3	1	0	0	1	3	17	+1.250
Free State	5	2	1	0	1	1	1	13	–0.079
North West	5	2	2	0	1	1	2	12	–0.027
Gauteng	5	2	1	0	1	1	0	12	–0.050
Eastern Province	5	2	2	0	0	1	0	10	–0.412
Boland	5	1	4	0	1	0	0	2	–0.490

==== Pool A ====
Team	Pld	W	L	T	NR	A	BP	Pts	NRR
Border	4	4	0	0	0	0	3	19	+2.638
KwaZulu-Natal	4	3	1	0	0	0	3	15	+2.483
South Western Districts	4	1	3	0	0	0	1	5	–1.054
KwaZulu-Natal Inland	4	1	3	0	0	0	1	5	–1.770
Kei	4	1	3	0	0	0	0	4	–2.151

==== Pool B ====
Team	Pld	W	L	T	NR	A	BP	Pts	NRR
Northerns (Q)	4	4	0	0	0	0	4	20	+3.366
Northern Cape	4	2	1	0	0	1	2	12	+0.077
Easterns	4	2	2	0	0	0	2	10	+0.722
Mpumalanga	4	1	2	0	0	1	1	7	–1.228
Limpopo	4	0	4	0	0	0	0	0	–2.994

Advanced to the second round group stages, joining the Top 6 teams

=== Second round ===
==== Week Pool A ====
Team	Pld	W	L	T	NR	A	BP	Pts	NRR
Western Province (Q)	2	2	0	0	0	0	2	10	+2.180
Gauteng (Q)	2	1	1	0	0	0	1	5	+1.534
Eastern Province	2	0	2	0	0	0	0	0	–2.607

==== Week Pool B ====
Team	Pld	W	L	T	NR	A	BP	Pts	NRR
Northerns (Q)	3	2	1	0	0	0	2	10	+1.598
North West (Q)	3	2	1	0	0	0	1	9	+0.412
Boland	3	1	2	0	0	0	1	5	–0.474
Free State	3	1	2	0	0	0	0	4	–1.561

Advanced to the semi-finals

== Knockout stages ==
=== Semi-finals ===
2 April 2017
Scorecard

Gauteng; 207/8 (50 overs)	v	Northerns; 166 (42.2 overs)
Trisha Chetty 84 (107); Paulinah Mashishi 4/51 (10 overs)		Mignon du Preez 75 (96); Yolani Fourie 2/23 (10 overs)

Gauteng won by 41 runs
University of the Free State Field 1, Bloemfontein

- Northerns won the toss and elected to field.

2 April 2017
Scorecard

Western Province; 148 (43.4 overs)	v	North West; 149/1 (24.5 overs)
Andrie Steyn 61 (108); Lizelle Lee 3/12 (4.4 overs)		Lizelle Lee 83 (67); Tala Ross 1/48 (9.5 overs)

North West won by 9 wickets
University of the Free State Field 4, Bloemfontein

- North West won the toss and elected to field.

=== Final ===
3 April 2017
Scorecard

North West; 174/9 (50 overs)	v	Gauteng; 158 (49.3 overs)
Lizelle Lee 84 (117); Shabnim Ismail 4/20 (10 overs)		Nonkhululeko Thabethe 41 (105); Lizelle Lee 4/20 (4.3 overs)

North West won by 16 runs
University of the Free State Field 1, Bloemfontein

- Gauteng won the toss and elected to field.

== Final placings ==
In addition to the semi-finals and final, a number of placing matches took place at the University of the Free State between 1 and 3 April 2017. The top six finishers qualified for the Top 6 league in the following season's tournament. Final placings of the top eight teams were as follows:

Position	Team
1st	North West
2nd	Gauteng
3rd	Northerns
4th	Western Province
5th	Free State
6th	Border
7th	Boland
8th	Eastern Province
