= 2021–22 CSA Women's Provincial Programme =

South African women's domestic cricket season

- Dates: 23 October 2021 – 9 April 2022
- Administrator(s): Cricket South Africa
- Cricket format: 50 over
- Tournament format(s): Round robin
- Champions: North West (4th title)
- Participants: 16
- Matches: 50

The 2021–22 CSA Women's Provincial Programme was the 26th edition of South Africa's provincial one-day cricket tournament. The tournament ran from October 2021 to April 2022, with 16 teams competing in three divisions. North West won the tournament, their fourth one day title.

== Competition format ==
The 16 teams were divided into three divisions: a top division named "Top 6", and two lower divisions, Pools A and B. Teams in Pools A and B played each other team in their group once in a round-robin format, whilst teams in the Top 6 league played each other team in their group twice. Matches were played using a one day format, with 50 overs per side.

The winner of the Top 6 league was crowned the Champions. The winners of Pools A and B played off for promotion. The tournament ran concurrently with the 2021–22 CSA Women's Provincial T20 Competition, with matches played either the day before or day after the corresponding encounter between two teams in the T20 tournament.

The groups worked on a points system with positions being based on the total points. Points were awarded as follows:

Win: 4 points.
Tie: 3 points.
Loss: 0 points.
Abandoned/No Result: 2 points.
Bonus Point: 1 bonus point available per match.

== Teams ==
Top 6	Central Gauteng	Easterns	Northerns	KwaZulu-Natal Coastal	North West	Western Province
Pool A	Boland	Border	Eastern Province	Kei	South Western Districts	
Pool B	Free State	KwaZulu-Natal Inland	Limpopo	Mpumalanga	Northern Cape	

== Tables ==
=== Top 6 ===
Team	Pld	W	L	T	NR	A	BP	Pts	NRR
North West (C)	10	8	2	0	0	0	7	39	+1.626
Western Province	10	6	4	0	0	0	4	28	+0.908
Northerns	10	5	4	0	0	1	3	25	+0.369
KwaZulu-Natal Coastal	10	5	4	0	0	1	3	25	–0.150
Central Gauteng	10	4	6	0	0	0	4	20	+0.091
Easterns (R)	10	1	9	0	0	0	0	4	–2.947

=== Pool A ===
Team	Pld	W	L	T	NR	A	BP	Pts	NRR
South Western Districts (PO)	4	4	0	0	0	0	3	19	+1.771
Eastern Province	4	3	1	0	0	0	3	15	+2.608
Boland	4	1	2	0	0	1	0	6	–1.081
Border	4	1	3	0	0	0	1	5	–1.066
Kei	4	0	3	0	0	1	0	2	–5.711

=== Pool B ===
Team	Pld	W	L	T	NR	A	BP	Pts	NRR
Free State (PO)	4	3	0	0	0	1	3	17	+4.183
Limpopo	4	3	1	0	0	0	2	14	+0.897
KwaZulu-Natal Inland	4	1	2	0	1	0	1	7	–0.610
Northern Cape	4	0	1	0	1	2	0	6	–0.620
Mpumalanga	4	0	3	0	0	1	0	2	–3.724

== Promotion play-off ==
9 April 2022
Scorecard

Free State; 138 (31.2 overs)	v	South Western Districts; 141/5 (40.2 overs)
Yolandi Potgieter 46 (77); Vuyowethu Bonya 5/14 (3.2 overs)		Mochelle May 42 (93); Annerie Dercksen 2/17 (8 overs)

South Western Districts won by 5 wickets
Wanderers Stadium, Johannesburg
Umpires: Roger Burne and Jannie Erasmus

- South Western Districts won the toss and elected to field.
- South Western Districts were promoted to the top tier of the tournament.
