= 2021–22 CSA Women's Provincial T20 Competition =

South African women's domestic cricket season

- Dates: 16 January – 27 March 2022
- Administrator(s): Cricket South Africa
- Cricket format: Twenty20
- Tournament format(s): Round robin
- Champions: Western Province (7th title)
- Participants: 16
- Matches: 35

The 2021–22 CSA Women's Provincial T20 Competition was the 9th edition of South Africa's provincial Twenty20 cricket tournament. The tournament began in January 2022 and ended on 27 March 2022, with 16 teams competing in three divisions. Western Province won the tournament, their seventh T20 title.

== Competition format ==
The 16 teams were divided into three divisions: a top division named "Top 6", and two lower divisions, Pools A and B. Teams played each other team in their group once in a round-robin format, with matches played using a Twenty20 format. The winner of the Top 6 group was crowned Champions.

The tournament ran concurrently with the 2021–22 CSA Women's Provincial Programme, with matches played either the day before or day after the corresponding encounter between two teams in the one-day tournament. To maintain this link for the following season, promotion and relegation in the Provincial T20 Competition is determined by standings in the Provincial League.

The groups worked on a points system with positions being based on the total points. Points were awarded as follows:

Win: 4 points.
Tie: 3 points.
Loss: 0 points.
Abandoned/No Result: 2 points.
Bonus Point: 1 bonus point available per match.

== Teams ==
Top 6	Central Gauteng	Easterns	Northerns	KwaZulu-Natal Coastal	North West	Western Province
Pool A	Boland	Border	Eastern Province	Kei	South Western Districts	
Pool B	Free State	KwaZulu-Natal Inland	Limpopo	Mpumalanga	Northern Cape	

== Tables ==
=== Top 6 ===
Team	Pld	W	L	T	NR	A	BP	Pts	NRR
Western Province (C)	5	5	0	0	0	0	3	23	+1.336
Central Gauteng	5	3	2	0	0	0	3	15	+0.798
North West	5	3	2	0	0	0	2	14	+0.669
Northerns	5	2	2	0	0	1	0	10	+0.125
KwaZulu-Natal Coastal	5	1	3	0	0	1	1	7	–0.206
Easterns	5	0	5	0	0	0	0	0	–2.563

=== Pool A ===
Team	Pld	W	L	T	NR	A	BP	Pts	NRR
South Western Districts	4	4	0	0	0	0	3	19	+2.237
Boland	4	2	1	0	0	1	0	10	–0.215
Eastern Province	4	2	2	0	0	0	1	9	+0.732
Border	4	1	3	0	0	0	1	5	–0.295
Kei	4	0	3	0	0	1	0	2	–4.143

=== Pool B ===
Team	Pld	W	L	T	NR	A	BP	Pts	NRR
Free State	4	4	0	0	0	0	4	20	+3.754
KwaZulu-Natal Inland	4	3	1	0	0	0	2	14	+0.881
Limpopo	4	2	2	0	0	0	1	9	+0.078
Northern Cape	4	1	3	0	0	0	1	5	–0.973
Mpumalanga	4	0	4	0	0	0	0	0	–2.587
