= 2018–19 CSA Women's Provincial League =

South African women's domestic cricket season

- Dates: 13 October 2018 – 29 March 2019
- Administrator(s): Cricket South Africa
- Cricket format: 50 over
- Tournament format(s): Round robin and knockout
- Champions: North West (2nd title)
- Participants: 16
- Matches: 55
- Most runs: Tazmin Brits (542)
- Most wickets: Evodia Yekile (17)

The 2018–19 CSA Women's Provincial League was the 24th edition of South Africa's provincial one-day cricket tournament. It ran from October 2018 to March 2019, with 16 provincial teams taking part. North West beat Western Province in the final to win their second one-day title.

== Competition format ==
The 16 teams were divided into three divisions: a top division named "Top 6", and two lower divisions, Pools A and B. Teams played each other team in their group once in a round-robin format, with matches played using a one day format with 50 overs per side.

All six teams in the Top 6 group progressed to a further round of groups, joined by the winners of Pools A and B. The eight teams were divided into two groups, playing each other team in their group once. The top four teams from this stage progressed to the semi-finals, whilst the bottom four teams played in a series of placing matches. The top six placed sides in these matches qualified for the next season's Top 6 league.

The tournament ran concurrently with the 2018–19 CSA Women's Provincial T20 Competition, with matches played either the day before or day after the corresponding encounter between two teams in the T20 tournament. To maintain this link for the following season, promotion and relegation in the Provincial T20 Competition was determined by standings in the Provincial League.

The groups worked on a points system with positions being based on the total points. Points were awarded as follows:

Win: 4 points
Tie: 3 points
Loss: 0 points.
Abandoned/No Result: 2 points.
Bonus Point: 1 bonus point available per match.

== Teams ==
Top 6	Boland	Border	Gauteng	Northerns	North West	Western Province
Pool A	Eastern Province	Free State	Northern Cape	Kei	South Western Districts	
Pool B	Easterns	KwaZulu-Natal	KwaZulu-Natal Inland	Limpopo	Mpumalanga	

== Group stages ==
=== First round ===
==== Top 6 ====
Team	Pld	W	L	T	NR	A	BP	Pts	NRR
North West	5	5	0	0	0	0	5	25	+3.392
Western Province	5	3	2	0	0	0	3	15	+0.994
Border	5	2	2	0	1	0	1	11	–1.212
Northerns	5	2	3	0	0	0	1	9	–0.300
Gauteng	5	1	2	0	1	1	1	9	–1.048
Boland	5	0	4	0	0	1	0	2	–3.246

==== Pool A ====
Team	Pld	W	L	T	NR	A	BP	Pts	NRR
Free State (Q)	4	4	0	0	0	0	4	20	+4.918
Eastern Province	4	3	1	0	0	0	3	15	+1.852
South Western Districts	4	2	2	0	0	0	2	10	+1.313
Northern Cape	4	1	3	0	0	0	1	5	–1.786
Kei	4	0	4	0	0	0	0	0	–5.486

==== Pool B ====
Team	Pld	W	L	T	NR	A	BP	Pts	NRR
KwaZulu-Natal (Q)	4	4	0	0	0	0	4	20	+4.672
Mpumalanga	4	3	1	0	0	0	3	15	+1.799
Limpopo	4	2	2	0	0	0	2	10	–1.029
KwaZulu-Natal Inland	4	1	3	0	0	1	1	5	–1.271
Easterns	4	0	4	0	0	0	0	0	–1.896

Advanced to the second round group stages, joining the Top 6 teams

=== Second round ===
==== Week Pool A ====
Team	Pld	W	L	T	NR	A	BP	Pts	NRR
North West (Q)	3	3	0	0	0	0	2	14	+2.460
Northerns (Q)	3	2	1	0	0	0	2	10	+1.207
Gauteng	3	1	2	0	0	0	1	5	–0.258
KwaZulu-Natal	3	0	3	0	0	0	0	0	–3.507

==== Week Pool B ====
Team	Pld	W	L	T	NR	A	BP	Pts	NRR
Western Province (Q)	3	3	0	0	0	0	2	14	+2.254
Free State(Q)	3	1	2	0	0	0	1	5	+0.406
Border	3	1	2	0	0	0	0	4	–0.775
Boland	3	1	2	0	0	0	0	4	–1.892

Advanced to the semi-finals

== Knockout stages ==
=== Semi-finals ===
28 March 2019
Scorecard

Free State; 113 (45.4 overs)	v	North West; 117/2 (18.1 overs)
Yolandi Potgieter 37 (83); Alyssa Erxleben 3/21 (10 overs)		Tazmin Brits 51* (41); Gizelle Janse van Rensburg 1/20 (6 overs)

North West won by 8 wickets
St. Andrew's School Vossie's Field, Bloemfontein
Umpires: K Botha and Madri van Staden

- Free State won the toss and chose to bat.

28 March 2019
Scorecard

Western Province; 175/6 (44.2 overs)	v	Northerns; 189 (48.4 overs)
Laura Wolvaardt 94 (114); Nadine de Klerk 4/36 (10 overs)		Mignon du Preez 50 (53); Lara Goodall 3/22 (4.4 overs)

Western Province won by 22 runs
Tokkie Park, Bloemfontein
Umpires: Lauren Agenbag and K Klaaste

- Northerns won the toss and elected to field.

=== Final ===
29 March 2019
Scorecard

Western Province; 151 (47 overs)	v	North West; 152/3 (30.3 overs)
Alexis le Breton 29 (40); Tumi Sekhukhune 4/17 (9 overs)		Lizelle Lee 56 (57); Andrie Steyn 1/15 (4 overs)

North West won by 7 wickets
St. Andrew's School Vossie's Field, Bloemfontein
Umpires: Lauren Agenbag and Shiree Steyn

- Western Province won the toss and elected to bat.

== Final placings ==
In addition to the semi-finals and final, a number of placing matches took place in Bloemfontein on 28 and 29 March 2019. The top six finishers qualified for the Top 6 league in the following season's tournament. Final placings of the top eight teams were as follows:

Position	Team
1st	North West
2nd	Western Province
3rd	Northerns
4th	Free State
5th	KwaZulu-Natal
6th	Gauteng
7th	Border
8th	Boland
