= 2018–19 CSA Women's Provincial T20 Competition =

South African women's domestic cricket season

- Dates: 14 October 2018 – 24 February 2019
- Administrator(s): Cricket South Africa
- Cricket format: Twenty20
- Tournament format(s): Round-robin divisions
- Champions: North West (1st title)
- Participants: 16
- Matches: 35
- Most runs: Izabella Cilliers (194)
- Most wickets: Nondumiso Shangase (9)

The 2018–19 CSA Women's Provincial T20 Competition was the 7th edition of South Africa's provincial Twenty20 cricket tournament. It ran from October 2018 to February 2019, with 16 provincial teams taking part. North West won the tournament, claiming their first T20 title.

== Competition format ==
The 16 teams were divided into three divisions: a top division named "Top 6", and two lower divisions, Pools A and B. Teams played each other team in their group once in a round-robin format, with matches played using a Twenty20 format. The winner of the Top 6 group was crowned Champions.

The tournament ran concurrently with the 2018–19 CSA Women's Provincial League, with matches played either the day before or day after the corresponding encounter between two teams in the one-day tournament. To maintain this link for the following season, promotion and relegation in the Provincial T20 Competition was determined by standings in the Provincial League.

The groups worked on a points system with positions being based on the total points. Points were awarded as follows:

Win: 4 points
Tie: 3 points
Loss: 0 points.
Abandoned/No Result: 2 points.
Bonus Point: 1 bonus point available per match.

== Teams ==
Top 6	Boland	Border	Gauteng	Northerns	North West	Western Province
Pool A	Eastern Province	Free State	Northern Cape	Kei	South Western Districts	
Pool B	Easterns	KwaZulu-Natal	KwaZulu-Natal Inland	Limpopo	Mpumalanga	

== Standings ==
=== Top 6 ===
Team	Pld	W	L	T	NR	A	BP	Pts	NRR
North West (C)	5	5	0	0	0	0	4	24	+2.813
Western Province	5	3	2	0	0	0	2	14	+0.729
Boland	5	2	2	0	0	1	1	11	–0.558
Northerns	5	2	3	0	0	0	1	9	–0.413
Border	5	1	3	0	0	1	0	6	–1.707
Gauteng	5	0	3	0	0	2	0	4	–1.232

=== Pool A ===
Team	Pld	W	L	T	NR	A	BP	Pts	NRR
Free State	4	3	1	0	0	0	3	15	+3.075
Eastern Province	4	3	1	0	0	0	1	13	+0.238
Northern Cape	4	2	2	0	0	0	2	10	+1.066
South Western Districts	4	2	2	0	0	0	2	10	+0.729
Kei	4	0	4	0	0	0	0	0	–5.050

=== Pool B ===
Team	Pld	W	L	T	NR	A	BP	Pts	NRR
KwaZulu-Natal	4	4	0	0	0	0	3	19	+3.113
Mpumalanga	4	3	1	0	0	0	2	14	+1.007
Easterns	4	2	2	0	0	0	2	10	+0.468
Limpopo	4	1	3	0	0	0	1	5	–1.800
KwaZulu-Natal Inland	4	0	4	0	0	0	0	0	–3.008
