= 2017–18 CSA Women's Provincial League =

South African women's domestic cricket season

- Dates: 14 October 2017 – 8 April 2018
- Administrator(s): Cricket South Africa
- Cricket format: 50 over
- Tournament format(s): Round robin and knockout
- Champions: Western Province (8th title)
- Participants: 16
- Matches: 55
- Most runs: Faye Tunnicliffe (300)
- Most wickets: Michelle Botha (18)

The 2017–18 CSA Women's Provincial League was the 23rd edition of South Africa's provincial one-day cricket tournament. It ran from October 2017 to April 2018, with 16 provincial teams taking part. Western Province beat Gauteng in the final to win their eighth one-day title.

== Competition format ==
The 16 teams were divided into three divisions: a top division named "Top 6", and two lower divisions, Pools A and B. Teams played each other team in their group once in a round-robin format, with matches played using a one day format with 50 overs per side.

All six teams in the Top 6 group progressed to a further round of groups, joined by the winners of Pools A and B. The eight teams were divided into two groups, playing each other team in their group once. The top four teams from this stage progressed to the semi-finals, whilst the bottom four teams played in a series of placing matches. The top six placed sides in these matches qualified for the next season's Top 6 league.

The tournament ran concurrently with the 2017–18 CSA Women's Provincial T20 Competition, with matches played either the day before or day after the corresponding encounter between two teams in the T20 tournament. To maintain this link for the following season, promotion and relegation in the Provincial T20 Competition was determined by standings in the Provincial League.

The groups worked on a points system with positions being based on the total points. Points were awarded as follows:

Win: 4 points
Tie: 3 points
Loss: 0 points.
Abandoned/No Result: 2 points.
Bonus Point: 1 bonus point available per match.

== Teams ==
Top 6	Border	Free State	Gauteng	Northerns	North West	Western Province
Pool A	Boland	Eastern Province	Northern Cape	Kei	South Western Districts	
Pool B	Easterns	KwaZulu-Natal	KwaZulu-Natal Inland	Limpopo	Mpumalanga	

== Group stages ==
=== First round ===
==== Top 6 ====
Team	Pld	W	L	T	NR	A	BP	Pts	NRR
Northerns	5	4	1	0	0	0	3	19	+1.243
North West	5	4	1	0	0	0	3	19	+1.215
Gauteng	5	3	2	0	0	0	3	15	+0.203
Western Province	5	2	3	0	0	0	2	10	+0.668
Free State	5	2	3	0	0	0	1	9	–0.417
Border	5	0	5	0	0	0	0	0	–2.917

==== Pool A ====
Team	Pld	W	L	T	NR	A	BP	Pts	NRR
Boland (Q)	4	4	0	0	0	0	3	19	+2.120
South Western Districts	4	3	1	0	0	0	2	14	+1.110
Eastern Province	4	2	2	0	0	0	2	10	+0.657
Northern Cape	4	1	3	0	0	0	1	5	–0.273
Kei	4	0	4	0	0	0	0	0	–3.824

==== Pool B ====
Team	Pld	W	L	T	NR	A	BP	Pts	NRR
Easterns (Q)	4	4	0	0	0	0	4	20	+3.366
KwaZulu-Natal	4	2	1	0	0	1	2	12	+0.077
Mpumalanga	4	2	2	0	0	0	2	10	+0.722
KwaZulu-Natal Inland	4	1	2	0	0	1	1	7	–1.228
Limpopo	4	0	4	0	0	0	0	0	–2.994

Advanced to the second round group stages, joining the Top 6 teams

=== Second round ===
==== Week Pool A ====
Team	Pld	W	L	T	NR	A	BP	Pts	NRR
Western Province (Q)	3	2	1	0	0	0	2	10	+1.090
North West (Q)	3	1	0	0	2	0	1	9	+1.380
Boland	3	1	1	0	1	0	0	7	–0.642
Free State	3	0	2	0	1	0	0	2	–0.871

==== Week Pool B ====
Team	Pld	W	L	T	NR	A	BP	Pts	NRR
Gauteng (Q)	3	2	0	0	0	1	2	12	+2.553
Northerns (Q)	3	1	1	0	0	1	1	7	+0.071
Border	3	1	1	0	0	1	1	7	–0.524
Easterns	3	0	2	0	0	1	0	2	–1.492

Advanced to the semi-finals

== Knockout stages ==
=== Semi-finals ===
7 April 2018
Scorecard

Gauteng	v	North West

Match Abandoned
University of the Free State Ground, Bloemfontein

- No toss.
- No play possible due to rain.
- Gauteng advanced to the final by virtue of better group stage record.

7 April 2018
Scorecard

Northerns; 175/6 (44.2 overs)	v	Western Province
Mignon du Preez 72* (85); Stacy Lackay 2/42 (10 overs)

No Result
St. Andrew's A, Bloemfontein
Umpires: K Botha and Y Kroucamp

- Western Province won the toss and elected to field.
- No further play possible due to rain.
- Western Province advanced to the final by virtue of better group stage record.

=== Final ===
8 April 2018
Scorecard

Western Province; 231/6 (50 overs)	v	Gauteng; 193/8 (50 overs)
Stacy Lackay 107 (106); Yolani Fourie 3/40 (10 overs)		Trisha Chetty 100 (127); Tatum le Roux 3/35 (10 overs)

Western Province won by 38 runs
St. Andrew's A, Bloemfontein
Umpires: Lauren Agenbag and K Botha

- Gauteng won the toss and elected to field.

== Final placings ==
In addition to the semi-finals and final, a number of placing matches took place at the University of the Free State on 7 and 8 April 2018. The top six finishers qualified for the Top 6 league in the following season's tournament. Both the third and fifth-place play-offs were abandoned due to rain. Final placings of the top eight teams were as follows:

Position	Team
1st	Western Province
2nd	Gauteng
3rd=	Northerns
3rd=	North West
5th=	Boland
5th=	Border
7th	Easterns
8th	Free State
