= 2022–23 CSA Women's Provincial Programme =

South African women's domestic cricket season

- Dates: 24 September 2022 – 24 April 2023
- Administrator(s): Cricket South Africa
- Cricket format: 50 over
- Tournament format(s): Round robin
- Champions: Western Province (9th title)
- Participants: 16
- Matches: 50

The 2022–23 CSA Women's Provincial Programme was the 27th edition of South Africa's provincial one-day cricket tournament. The tournament ran from September 2022 to April 2023, with 16 teams competing in three divisions. North West were the defending champions.

Western Province won the competition, their ninth one-day title.

== Competition format ==
The 16 teams were divided into three divisions: a top division named "Top 6", and two lower divisions, Pools A and B. Teams in Pools A and B played each other team in their group once in a round-robin format, whilst teams in the Top 6 league played each other team in their group twice. Matches were played using a one day format, with 50 overs per side.

The winner of the Top 6 league was crowned the Champions. The winners of Pools A and B played off for promotion. The tournament ran concurrently with the 2022–23 CSA Women's Provincial T20 Competition, with matches played either the day before or day after the corresponding encounter between two teams in the T20 tournament.

The groups worked on a points system with positions being based on the total points. Points were awarded as follows:

Win: 4 points.
Tie: 3 points.
Loss: 0 points.
Abandoned/No Result: 2 points.
Bonus Point: 1 bonus point available per match.

== Teams ==
Top 6	Central Gauteng	Northerns	KwaZulu-Natal Coastal	North West	South Western Districts	Western Province
Pool A	Boland	Border	Eastern Province	Free State	Kei	
Pool B	Easterns	KwaZulu-Natal Inland	Limpopo	Mpumalanga	Northern Cape	

== Tables ==
As of 9 December 2022

=== Top 6 ===
Team	Pld	W	L	T	NR	A	BP	Pts	NRR
Western Province (C)	10	7	1	0	1	1	4	36	+0.897
KwaZulu-Natal Coastal	10	4	2	0	2	2	3	27	+0.391
Northerns	10	4	5	0	1	0	3	21	–0.110
South Western Districts	9	4	5	0	0	0	2	18	–0.894
Central Gauteng	10	3	6	0	0	1	2	16	–0.894
North West (R)	9	2	5	0	0	2	1	13	–0.328

=== Pool A ===
Team	Pld	W	L	T	NR	A	BP	Pts	NRR
Free State (PO)	3	3	0	0	0	0	2	14	+1.380
Boland	4	3	1	0	0	0	2	14	+0.698
Eastern Province	4	2	2	0	0	0	1	9	+0.468
Border	4	0	3	0	0	1	0	2	–0.285
Kei	3	0	2	0	0	1	0	2	–3.850

=== Pool B ===
Team	Pld	W	L	T	NR	A	BP	Pts	NRR
Northern Cape (PO)	4	3	0	0	0	1	3	17	+3.363
Mpumalanga	4	2	2	0	0	0	2	10	–0.028
Limpopo	4	2	2	0	0	0	0	8	–0.838
Easterns	4	1	2	0	0	1	1	7	+0.136
KwaZulu-Natal Inland	4	1	3	0	0	0	0	4	–0.826

== Promotion play-off ==
24 April 2023
Scorecard

Free State; 348/4 (50 overs)	v	Northern Cape; 160 (34.4 overs)
Yolandi Potgieter 167 (140); C Velskoen 2/86		Susan Benade 41 (38); Christen van Wyk 4/30

Free State won by 188 runs
Mangaung Oval, Bloemfontein

- Northern Cape won the toss and elected to field.
- Free State were promoted to the top tier of the tournament.
