= 2019–20 CSA Women's Provincial T20 Competition =

South African women's domestic cricket season

- Dates: 13 October 2019 – 29 March 2020
- Administrator(s): Cricket South Africa
- Cricket format: Twenty20
- Tournament format(s): Round-robin divisions
- Champions: Western Province (6th title)
- Participants: 16
- Matches: 50 (45 completed)
- Most runs: Tazmin Brits (369)
- Most wickets: Jane de Figueiredo (11)

The 2019–20 CSA Women's Provincial T20 Competition was the 8th edition of South Africa's provincial Twenty20 cricket tournament. It ran from October 2019 to March 2020, with 16 provincial teams taking part. The tournament was curtailed by the outbreak of the COVID-19 pandemic, with Western Province winning their sixth T20 title based on an adjusted points system.

== Competition format ==
The 16 teams were divided into three divisions: a top division named "Top 6", and two lower divisions, Pools A and B. Teams played each other team in their group once in a round-robin format, with matches played using a Twenty20 format. The winner of the Top 6 group was crowned Champions. Due to the COVID-19 pandemic, the final five matches in the Top 6 league were cancelled. The points given to each team were therefore adjusted to simulate an equal number of matches played.

The tournament ran concurrently with the 2019–20 CSA Women's Provincial League, with matches played either the day before or the day after the corresponding encounter between two teams in the one-day tournament. To maintain this link for the following season, promotion and relegation in the Provincial T20 Competition were determined by standings in the Provincial League.

The groups worked on a points system with positions being based on the total points. Points were awarded as follows:

Win: 4 points
Tie: 3 points
Loss: 0 points.
Abandoned/No Result: 2 points.
Bonus Point: 1 bonus point available per match.

== Teams ==
Top 6	Central Gauteng	Free State	KwaZulu-Natal Coastal	Northerns	North West	Western Province
Pool A	Boland	Border	Eastern Province	Kei	South Western Districts	
Pool B	Easterns	KwaZulu-Natal Inland	Limpopo	Mpumalanga	Northern Cape	

== Standings ==
=== Top 6 ===
Team	Pld	W	L	T	NR	A	BP	Adj (Note: The last round of matches were cancelled due to the COVID-19 pandemic. To adjust for this, teams that had only played eight matches at that point were awarded an additional eighth of their point share.)	Pts	NRR
Western Province (C)	8	7	1	0	0	0	2	3.75	33.75	+0.948
North West	9	6	3	0	0	0	3	0	27	+0.950
Free State	8	3	4	0	0	1	1	1.88	16.88	–0.260
KwaZulu-Natal Coastal	8	3	5	0	0	0	0	1.5	13.5	–0.799
Northerns	8	2	5	0	0	1	2	1.5	13.5	–0.967
Central Gauteng	9	2	5	0	0	2	1	0	13	–0.110

=== Pool A ===
Team	Pld	W	L	T	NR	A	BP	Pts	NRR
Eastern Province	4	4	0	0	0	0	3	19	+1.781
Border	4	3	1	0	0	0	2	14	+1.764
South Western Districts	4	1	2	0	1	0	1	7	–0.173
Boland	4	1	3	0	0	0	1	5	–0.277
Kei	4	0	3	0	1	0	0	2	–4.934

=== Pool B ===
Team	Pld	W	L	T	NR	A	BP	Pts	NRR
Easterns	4	3	1	0	0	0	3	15	+1.758
Northern Cape	4	3	1	0	0	0	3	15	+1.650
Mpumalanga	4	3	1	0	0	0	2	14	+0.234
Limpopo	4	1	3	0	0	0	0	4	–1.175
KwaZulu-Natal Inland	4	0	4	0	0	0	0	0	–2.450
