= 2026 Women's T20 World Cup squads =

Team captains during a promotional event for the T20 World Cup at Waterloo Bridge in London

The 2026 ICC Women's T20 World Cup was the tenth edition of the ICC Women's T20 World Cup, a biennial world cup for women's cricket in Women's Twenty20 International (WT20I) format organised by the International Cricket Council (ICC). It was hosted by the England and Wales Cricket Board from 12 June to 5 July 2026. Twelve teams competed in a total of 33 matches across seven venues in England.

Each team was allowed a maximum squad size of fifteen players. The teams were required to submit a provisional squad to the ICC by 1 May 2026 and were allowed to make changes to the squads until 1 June 2026. Any changes after this required permission from the ICC's technical committee. On 28 April 2026, hosts England became the first team to announce their squad for the tournament, followed by New Zealand on 29 April. India announced their squad on 2 May, followed by Netherlands on 6 May, South Africa on 12 May, Australia on 13 May, Pakistan on 16 May and the West Indies on 28 May. Sri Lanka became the last team to announce their squad on 29 May.

Players are listed in shirt number order and withdrawn players are placed at the bottom of the table followed by standby players. Given ages are as of 12 June 2026. Withdrawn/dropped players are struck through, and standby players are indicated by a dagger symbol (†). Domestic teams are the most recent T20 league teams that the players belonged to before the T20 World Cup and are only listed for countries with available data.

== Group A ==
=== Australia ===
- Squad announcement date: 13 May 2026
- Coach: (Australia) Shelley Nitschke

Australia squad for the tournament
No.	Player	Date of birth	Batting style	Bowling style	WBBL team (Note: As of 2025–26 Women's Big Bash League)
3	Megan Schutt	15 January 1993 (aged 33)	Right-handed	Right-arm medium-fast	Adelaide Strikers
6	Beth Mooney (wk)	14 January 1994 (aged 32)	Left-handed	—N/a	Perth Scorchers
8	Ellyse Perry	3 November 1990 (aged 35)	Right-handed	Right-arm medium-fast	Sydney Sixers
13	Georgia Voll	5 August 2003 (aged 22)	Right-handed	Right-arm off break	Sydney Thunder
14	Annabel Sutherland	12 October 2001 (aged 24)	Right-handed	Right-arm medium-fast	Melbourne Stars
16	Nicola Carey	10 September 1993 (aged 32)	Left-handed	Right-arm medium-fast	Hobart Hurricanes
18	Phoebe Litchfield	18 April 2003 (aged 23)	Left-handed	Right-arm leg break	Sydney Thunder
23	Sophie Molineux (c)	17 January 1998 (aged 28)	Left-handed	Slow left-arm orthodox	Melbourne Renegades
27	Alana King	22 November 1995 (aged 30)	Right-handed	Right-arm leg break	Perth Scorchers
32	Tahlia McGrath (vc)	10 November 1995 (aged 30)	Right-handed	Right-arm medium-fast	Adelaide Strikers
34	Kim Garth	25 April 1996 (aged 30)	Right-handed	Right-arm medium-fast	Melbourne Stars
35	Georgia Wareham	26 May 1999 (aged 27)	Right-handed	Right-arm leg break	Melbourne Renegades
48	Grace Harris	18 September 1993 (aged 32)	Right-handed	Right-arm off break	Brisbane Heat
55	Lucy Hamilton	8 May 2006 (aged 20)	Left-handed	Left-arm fast	Brisbane Heat
63	Ashleigh Gardner (vc)	15 April 1997 (aged 29)	Right-handed	Right-arm off break	Sydney Sixers

=== Bangladesh ===
- Squad announcement date: 10 May 2026
- Coach: (Bangladesh) Sarwar Imran

Bangladesh squad for the tournament
No.	Player	Date of birth	Batting style	Bowling style
1	Nigar Sultana (c, wk)	1 August 1997 (aged 28)	Right-handed	—N/a
2	Rabeya Khan	11 March 2005 (aged 21)	Right-handed	Right-arm leg break
6	Sobhana Mostary	13 February 2002 (aged 24)	Right-handed	Right-arm medium
7	Juairiya Ferdous (wk)	25 October 2005 (aged 20)	Right-handed	—N/a
9	Fahima Khatun	2 November 1992 (aged 33)	Right-handed	Right-arm leg break
11	Shorna Akter	1 January 2007 (aged 19)	Right-handed	Right-arm leg break
14	Sharmin Akhter	31 December 1995 (aged 30)	Right-handed	—N/a
29	Sultana Khatun	5 February 1996 (aged 30)	Right-handed	Right-arm off break
32	Nahida Akter (vc)	2 March 2000 (aged 26)	Right-handed	Slow left-arm orthodox
42	Sanjida Akter Meghla	4 June 2001 (aged 25)	Right-handed	Slow left-arm orthodox
73	Taj Nehar	3 October 1997 (aged 28)	Right-handed	Right-arm off break
77	Fariha Trisna	13 September 2002 (aged 23)	Right-handed	Left-arm medium
88	Ritu Moni	5 February 1993 (aged 33)	Right-handed	Right-arm medium
90	Marufa Akter	1 January 2005 (aged 21)	Right-handed	Right-arm medium-fast
92	Dilara Akter (wk)	6 April 2004 (aged 22)	Right-handed	—N/a

=== India ===
- Squad announcement date: 2 May 2026
- Coach: (India) Amol Muzumdar

India squad for the tournament
No.	Player	Date of birth	Batting style	Bowling style	WPL team (Note: As of 2026 Women's Premier League)
5	Jemimah Rodrigues	5 September 2000 (aged 25)	Right-handed	Right-arm off break	Delhi Capitals
6	Deepti Sharma	24 August 1997 (aged 28)	Left-handed	Right-arm off break	UP Warriorz
10	Renuka Singh	2 January 1996 (aged 30)	Right-handed	Right-arm medium-fast	Gujarat Giants
13	Richa Ghosh (wk)	28 September 2003 (aged 22)	Right-handed	—N/a	Royal Challengers Bengaluru
17	Shafali Verma	28 January 2004 (aged 22)	Right-handed	Right-arm off break	Delhi Capitals
18	Smriti Mandhana (vc)	18 July 1996 (aged 29)	Left-handed	Right-arm medium	Royal Challengers Bengaluru
19	Yastika Bhatia (wk)	1 November 2000 (aged 25)	Left-handed	—N/a	Gujarat Giants
20	Arundhati Reddy	4 October 1997 (aged 28)	Right-handed	Right-arm medium-fast	Royal Challengers Bengaluru
21	Radha Yadav	21 April 2000 (aged 26)	Right-handed	Slow left-arm orthodox	Royal Challengers Bengaluru
23	Harmanpreet Kaur (c)	8 March 1989 (aged 37)	Right-handed	Right-arm off break	Mumbai Indians
26	Kranti Gaud	11 August 2003 (aged 22)	Right-handed	Right-arm medium-fast	UP Warriorz
28	Prema Rawat (Note: Shreyanka Patil was ruled out of the tournament due to an ankle ligament injury and was replaced by Prema Rawat.)	12 November 2001 (aged 24)	Right-handed	Right-arm leg break	Royal Challengers Bengaluru
40	Shree Charani	4 August 2004 (aged 21)	Left-handed	Slow left-arm orthodox	Delhi Capitals
45	Bharti Fulmali	11 October 1994 (aged 31)	Right-handed	Right-arm off break	Gujarat Giants
58	Nandani Sharma	20 September 2001 (aged 24)	Right-handed	Right-arm medium-fast	Delhi Capitals
31	~~Shreyanka Patil~~	31 July 2002 (aged 23)	Right-handed	Right-arm off break	Royal Challengers Bengaluru

=== Netherlands ===
- Squad announcement date: 6 May 2026
- Coach: (Scotland) Neil MacRae

Netherlands squad for the tournament
No.	Player	Date of birth	Batting style	Bowling style
1	Babette de Leede (c, wk)	8 October 1999 (aged 26)	Right-handed	—N/a
2	Lara Leemhuis	16 June 2008 (aged 17)	Right-handed	Right-arm medium
3	Iris Zwilling	8 September 2001 (aged 24)	Right-handed	Right-arm medium
4	Hannah Landheer	20 October 2002 (aged 23)	Right-handed	Right-arm medium
5	Robine Rijke	1 September 1996 (aged 29)	Left-handed	Right-arm medium
8	Rosalie Ann Lawrence (wk)	30 December 2006 (aged 19)	Right-handed	Right-arm off break
9	Phebe Molkenboer	1 January 2005 (aged 21)	Right-handed	Right-arm off break
11	Isabel van der Woning	11 November 2001 (aged 24)	Right-handed	Right-arm medium
13	Heather Siegers	10 October 1996 (aged 29)	Right-handed	Right-arm medium
14	Caroline de Lange	27 July 1998 (aged 27)	Right-handed	Right-arm leg break
16	Sanya Khurana	27 February 2005 (aged 21)	Right-handed	Right-arm medium
22	Sterre Kalis	30 August 1999 (aged 26)	Right-handed	Right-arm medium
23	Myrthe van den Raad	3 February 2006 (aged 20)	Right-handed	Right-arm medium
27	Frederique Overdijk	12 April 2000 (aged 26)	Right-handed	Right-arm medium
31	Silver Siegers	14 February 2000 (aged 26)	Right-handed	Right-arm leg break

=== Pakistan ===
- Squad announcement date: 16 May 2026
- Coach: (Pakistan) Wahab Riaz

Pakistan squad for the tournament
No.	Player	Date of birth	Batting style	Bowling style
6	Nashra Sandhu	19 November 1997 (aged 28)	Right-handed	Slow left-arm orthodox
10	Tasmia Rubab	20 December 2002 (aged 23)	Right-handed	Left-arm medium-fast
14	Fatima Sana (c)	8 November 2001 (aged 24)	Right-handed	Right-arm medium-fast
15	Rameem Shamim	19 January 1996 (aged 30)	Left-handed	Right-arm off break
16	Iram Javed	16 December 1991 (aged 34)	Right-handed	Right-arm medium-fast
17	Muneeba Ali (wk)	8 August 1997 (aged 28)	Left-handed	—N/a
37	Aliya Riaz	24 September 1992 (aged 33)	Right-handed	Right-arm medium
39	Eyman Fatima	12 October 2004 (aged 21)	Right-handed	Right-arm medium
42	Diana Baig	15 October 1995 (aged 30)	Right-handed	Right-arm medium-fast
45	Sadia Iqbal	5 August 1995 (aged 30)	Left-handed	Slow left-arm orthodox
56	Gull Feroza (wk)	28 December 1998 (aged 27)	Right-handed	—N/a
63	Saira Jabeen	15 June 2001 (aged 24)	Right-handed	Right-arm medium-fast
72	Tuba Hassan	18 October 2000 (aged 25)	Left-handed	Right-arm leg break
79	Ayesha Zafar	9 July 1994 (aged 31)	Right-handed	Right-arm leg break
99	Natalia Pervaiz	25 December 1995 (aged 30)	Right-handed	Right-arm medium

=== South Africa ===
- Squad announcement date: 12 May 2026
- Coach: (South Africa) Mandla Mashimbyi

South Africa squad for the tournament
No.	Player	Date of birth	Batting style	Bowling style	CSA Pro20 Series team (Note: As of 2025–26 CSA Women Pro20 Series)
1	Tazmin Brits	8 January 1991 (age 35)	Right-handed	—N/a	Lions Women
7	Marizanne Kapp	4 January 1990 (age 36)	Right-handed	Right-arm medium	—N/a
10	Sinalo Jafta (wk)	22 December 1994 (age 31)	Right-handed	—N/a	Titans Women
12	Tumi Sekhukhune	21 November 1998 (age 27)	Left-handed	Right-arm fast-medium	Lions Women
14	Laura Wolvaardt (c)	26 April 1999 (age 27)	Right-handed	—N/a	Titans Women
25	Chloe Tryon	25 January 1994 (age 32)	Right-handed	Slow left-arm orthodox	Lions Women
28	Nonkululeko Mlaba	27 June 2000 (age 26)	Right-handed	Slow left-arm orthodox	Dolphins Women
32	Nadine de Klerk	16 January 2000 (age 26)	Right-handed	Right-arm medium	—N/a
53	Kayla Reyneke	21 October 2005 (age 21)	Right-handed	Right-arm off break	Western Province
72	Karabo Meso (wk)	18 September 2007 (age 19)	Right-handed	—N/a	Lions Women
77	Annerie Dercksen	26 April 2001 (age 25)	Right-handed	Right-arm medium	South Western Districts
81	Dane van Niekerk	14 May 1993 (age 33)	Right-handed	Right-arm leg break	Western Province
89	Shabnim Ismail	5 October 1988 (age 38)	Left-handed	Right-arm fast	Lions Women
96	Suné Luus	5 January 1996 (age 30)	Right-handed	Right-arm leg break	Titans Women
99	Ayabonga Khaka	18 July 1992 (age 34)	Right-handed	Right-arm medium	Lions Women

== Group B ==
=== England ===
- Squad announcement date: 28 April 2026
- Coach: (England) Charlotte Edwards

England squad for the tournament
No.	Player	Date of birth	Batting style	Bowling style	WT20 Blast team (Note: As of 2025 Women's T20 Blast)
5	Heather Knight	26 December 1990 (aged 35)	Right-handed	Right-arm off break	Somerset
19	Sophie Ecclestone	6 May 1999 (aged 27)	Right-handed	Slow left-arm orthodox	Lancashire Thunder
21	Tilly Corteen-Coleman	23 August 2007 (aged 18)	Left-handed	Slow left-arm orthodox	Surrey
24	Charlie Dean (vc)	22 December 2000 (aged 25)	Right-handed	Right-arm off break	Somerset
28	Danni Wyatt-Hodge	22 April 1991 (aged 35)	Right-handed	Right-arm off break	Surrey
39	Nat Sciver-Brunt (c)	20 August 1992 (aged 33)	Right-handed	Right-arm medium	The Blaze
40	Amy Jones (wk)	13 June 1993 (aged 32)	Right-handed	—N/a	The Blaze
47	Sophia Dunkley	16 June 1998 (aged 27)	Right-handed	Right-arm leg break	Surrey
50	Linsey Smith	10 March 1995 (aged 31)	Left-handed	Slow left-arm orthodox	Hampshire Hawks
63	Lauren Bell	2 January 2001 (aged 25)	Right-handed	Right-arm medium-fast	Hampshire Hawks
64	Alice Capsey	11 August 2004 (aged 21)	Right-handed	Right-arm off break	Surrey
66	Danielle Gibson	30 April 2001 (aged 25)	Right-handed	Right-arm medium	Somerset
73	Freya Kemp	21 April 2005 (aged 21)	Left-handed	Left-arm medium	Hampshire Hawks
82	Lauren Filer	22 December 2000 (aged 25)	Right-handed	Right-arm fast	Durham
95	Issy Wong	15 May 2002 (aged 24)	Right-handed	Right-arm fast-medium	Birmingham Bears

=== Ireland ===
- Squad announcement date: 20 May 2006
- Coach: (England) Lloyd Tennant

Ireland squad for the tournament
No.	Player	Date of birth	Batting style	Bowling style
4	Georgina Dempsey	29 July 2004 (aged 21)	Right-handed	Right-arm medium
9	Aimee Maguire	9 September 2006 (aged 19)	Right-handed	Slow left-arm orthodox
10	Orla Prendergast (vc)	1 June 2002 (aged 24)	Right-handed	Right-arm medium
11	Arlene Kelly	8 January 1994 (aged 32)	Right-handed	Right-arm medium
13	Rebecca Stokell	13 March 2000 (aged 26)	Right-handed	Right-arm medium
16	Leah Paul	10 September 1999 (aged 26)	Left-handed	Slow left-arm orthodox
24	Alice Tector (Note: Laura Delany was ruled out of the tournament due to an injury and was replaced by Alice Tector.)	15 May 2008 (aged 18)	Right-handed	Right-arm medium
26	Alana Dalzell	26 March 2001 (aged 25)	Right-handed	Right-arm medium
28	Jane Maguire (Note: Ava Canning was ruled out of the tournament due to an injury and was replaced by Jane Maguire.)	18 February 2003 (aged 23)	Right-handed	Right-arm medium
44	Christina Coulter Reilly (wk)	17 August 2003 (aged 22)	Right-handed	—N/a
54	Amy Hunter (wk)	11 October 2005 (aged 20)	Right-handed	—N/a
64	Louise Little	16 May 2003 (aged 23)	Right-handed	Right-arm medium
66	Gaby Lewis (c)	27 March 2001 (aged 25)	Right-handed	Right-arm leg break
73	Lara McBride	29 April 2006 (aged 20)	Right-handed	Right-arm off break
89	Cara Murray	1 November 2001 (aged 24)	Right-handed	Right-arm leg break
14	~~Laura Delany~~	23 December 1992 (aged 33)	Right-handed	Right-arm medium
42	~~Ava Canning~~	8 May 2004 (aged 22)	Right-handed	Right-arm medium

=== New Zealand ===
- Squad announcement date: 29 April 2026
- Coach: (Australia) Ben Sawyer

New Zealand squad for the tournament
No.	Player	Date of birth	Batting style	Bowling style	Super Smash team (Note: As of 2025–26 Women's Super Smash)
5	Maddy Green	20 October 1992 (aged 33)	Right-handed	Right-arm off break	Auckland Hearts
6	Lea Tahuhu	23 September 1990 (aged 35)	Right-handed	Right-arm medium-fast	Canterbury Magicians
13	Izzy Gaze (wk)	8 May 2004 (aged 22)	Right-handed	—N/a	Auckland Hearts
23	Suzie Bates	16 September 1987 (aged 38)	Right-handed	Right-arm off-spin	—N/a
24	Jess Kerr	18 January 1998 (aged 28)	Right-handed	Right-arm medium	Wellington Blaze
27	Flora Devonshire	13 February 2003 (aged 23)	Left-handed	Slow left-arm orthodox	Central Hinds
29	Polly Inglis (wk)	31 May 1996 (aged 30)	Right-handed	Right-arm medium	Otago Sparks
32	Rosemary Mair	7 November 1998 (aged 27)	Right-handed	Right-arm medium	Central Hinds
44	Izzy Sharp (wk)	1 December 2004 (aged 21)	Right-handed	—N/a	Canterbury Magicians
48	Amelia Kerr (c)	13 October 2000 (aged 25)	Right-handed	Right-arm leg break	Wellington Blaze
51	Nensi Patel	27 May 2002 (aged 24)	Right-handed	Right-arm off break	Northern Brave
58	Georgia Plimmer	8 February 2004 (aged 22)	Right-handed	Right-arm medium	Wellington Blaze
68	Brooke Halliday	30 October 1995 (aged 30)	Left-handed	Right-arm medium	Auckland Hearts
77	Sophie Devine	1 September 1989 (aged 36)	Right-handed	Right-arm medium	—N/a
92	Bree Illing	29 September 2003 (aged 22)	Left-handed	Left-arm medium	Auckland Hearts

=== Scotland ===
- Squad announcement date: 11 May 2026
- Coach: (Scotland) Craig Wallace

Scotland squad for the tournament
No.	Player	Date of birth	Batting style	Bowling style
6	Sarah Bryce (wk)	8 January 2000 (aged 26)	Right-handed	—N/a
7	Priyanaz Chatterji	12 August 1993 (aged 32)	Right-handed	Right-arm medium
9	Abtaha Maqsood	11 June 1999 (aged 27)	Right-handed	Right-arm leg break
11	Darcey Carter (wk)	31 May 2005 (aged 21)	Right-handed	Right-arm off break
15	Megan McColl	15 November 2000 (aged 25)	Right-handed	Right-arm medium
17	Kathryn Bryce (c)	17 November 1997 (aged 28)	Right-handed	Right-arm medium
18	Olivia Bell	12 November 2003 (aged 22)	Right-handed	Right-arm off break
22	Chloe Abel	3 December 2003 (aged 22)	Right-handed	Right-arm medium
23	Ailsa Lister (wk)	8 April 2004 (aged 22)	Right-handed	—N/a
24	Kirstie Gordon	20 October 1997 (aged 28)	Right-handed	Slow left-arm orthodox
45	Gabriella Fontenla	1 June 2008 (aged 18)	Right-handed	Right-arm medium
47	Maisie Maceira	29 September 2005 (aged 20)	Right-handed	Right-arm fast medium
63	Pippa Sproul (wk)	12 February 2008 (aged 18)	Right-handed	—N/a
70	Katherine Fraser	9 April 2005 (aged 21)	Right-handed	Right-arm off break
72	Rachel Slater	20 November 2001 (aged 24)	Right-handed	Left-arm medium

=== Sri Lanka ===
- Squad announcement date: 29 May 2026
- Coach: (Australia) Jamie Siddons

Sri Lanka squad for the tournament
No.	Player	Date of birth	Batting style	Bowling style
6	Kavisha Dilhari	24 January 2001 (aged 25)	Right-handed	Right-arm off break, Right-arm leg break
9	Imesha Dulani	20 January 2002 (aged 24)	Right-handed	Right-arm slow medium
10	Kawya Kavindi	30 October 2002 (aged 23)	Right-handed	Right-arm medium fast
15	Malki Madara	30 December 2000 (aged 25)	Right-handed	Right-arm medium
21	Shashini Gimhani	9 December 2008 (aged 17)	Right-handed	Left-arm wrist spin
27	Nilakshi de Silva	27 September 1989 (aged 36)	Right-handed	Right-arm slow medium
29	Mithali Ayodhya	13 January 2007 (aged 19)	Right-handed	Right-arm medium
33	Kaushini Nuthyangana (wk)	5 August 2002 (aged 23)	Right-handed	—N/a
36	Hansima Karunaratne	4 October 1993 (aged 32)	Right-handed	Right-arm medium
58	Chamari Athapaththu (c)	9 February 1990 (aged 36)	Left-handed	Right-arm off break
62	Vishmi Gunaratne	22 August 2005 (aged 20)	Right-handed	Right-arm medium fast
72	Hasini Perera	27 June 1995 (aged 30)	Left-handed	Right-arm medium fast
78	Nimasha Meepage	15 August 1999 (aged 26)	Right-handed	Slow left-arm orthodox
88	Harshitha Samarawickrama	29 June 1998 (aged 27)	Left-handed	—N/a
91	Sugandika Kumari	5 October 1991 (aged 34)	Left-handed	Slow left-arm orthodox

=== West Indies ===
- Squad announcement date: 28 May 2026
- Coach: (Australia) Shane Deitz

West Indies squad for the tournament
No.	Player	Date of birth	Batting style	Bowling style	WCPL team (Note: As of 2025 Women's Caribbean Premier League)
5	Deandra Dottin	21 June 1991 (aged 34)	Right-handed	Right-arm fast medium	Trinbago Knight Riders
7	Stafanie Taylor	11 June 1991 (aged 35)	Right-handed	Right-arm off break	Guyana Amazon Warriors
9	Afy Fletcher	17 March 1987 (aged 39)	Right-handed	Right-arm leg break	Barbados Royals
19	Jahzara Claxton	12 March 2006 (aged 20)	Left-handed	Right-arm fast medium	Trinbago Knight Riders
21	Jannillea Glasgow	5 January 2004 (aged 22)	Left-handed	Right-arm fast medium	Trinbago Knight Riders
30	Shemaine Campbelle (wk)	14 October 1992 (aged 33)	Right-handed	Right-arm medium fast	Guyana Amazon Warriors
48	Chinelle Henry (vc)	17 August 1995 (aged 30)	Right-handed	Right-arm medium fast	Barbados Royals
50	Hayley Matthews (c)	19 March 1998 (aged 28)	Right-handed	Right-arm off break	Barbados Royals
55	Zaida James	30 October 2004 (aged 21)	Left-handed	Slow left-arm orthodox	Trinbago Knight Riders
58	Shawnisha Hector	7 October 1999 (aged 26)	Right-handed	Right-arm medium	Trinbago Knight Riders
73	Qiana Joseph	22 January 2001 (aged 25)	Left-handed	Slow left-arm orthodox	Barbados Royals
75	Ashmini Munisar	7 December 2003 (aged 22)	Right-handed	Right-arm off break	Guyana Amazon Warriors
77	Karishma Ramharack	20 January 1995 (aged 31)	Left-handed	Right-arm off break	Guyana Amazon Warriors
78	Aaliyah Alleyne	11 November 1994 (aged 31)	Right-handed	Right-arm medium	Barbados Royals
99	Mandy Mangru	22 September 1999 (aged 26)	Right-handed	Right-arm off break	Barbados Royals
