= Jana Nell =

South African cricketer (born 1990)

Personal information
- Full name: Jana Nell
- Born: 28 February 1990 (age 36); Port Elizabeth, South Africa
- Batting: Right-handed
- Bowling: Right-arm off break
- Role: All-rounder

International information
- National side: South Africa (2010)
- ODI debut (cap 59): 9 October 2010 v Ireland
- Last ODI: 12 October 2010 v Netherlands
- T20I debut (cap 23): 14 October 2010 v West Indies
- Last T20I: 16 October 2010 v Pakistan

Domestic team information
- Years: Team
- 2004/05–present: Eastern Province

Career statistics
Competition	WODI	WT20I
Matches	2	3
Runs scored	–	17
Batting average	–	8.50
100s/50s	–	0/0
Top score	–	17*
Balls bowled	–	24
Wickets	–	2
Bowling average	–	6.00
5 wickets in innings	–	0
10 wickets in match	–	0
Best bowling	–	2/12
Catches/stumpings	0/–	2/–
- Source: CricketArchive, 15 February 2022

Jana Nell (born 28 February 1990) is a South African cricketer who plays as an all-rounder, batting right-handed and bowling right-arm off break. In 2010, she played two One Day Internationals three Twenty20 Internationals for South Africa, all in the ICC Women's Cricket Challenge. She plays domestic cricket for Eastern Province.

In 2013, in a 50-over match for Eastern Province against Kei, Nell took 8 wickets for 7 runs from 7.4 overs to help bowl the opposition out for just 28.
