= Levona Lewis =

South African cricketer (born 1972)

Personal information
- Full name: Levona P Lewis
- Born: 15 November 1972 (age 53); South Africa
- Bowling: Left-arm medium
- Role: Bowler

International information
- National side: South Africa (1999–2000)
- ODI debut (cap 20): 5 February 1999 v Australia
- Last ODI: 16 December 2000 v Ireland

Domestic team information
- Years: Team
- 1997/98: Western Province

Career statistics
Competition	WODI	WLA
Matches	9	11
Runs scored	17	32
Batting average	–	–
100s/50s	0/0	0/0
Top score	10*	15*
Balls bowled	335	425
Wickets	10	12
Bowling average	23.70	24.75
5 wickets in innings	0	0
10 wickets in match	0	0
Best bowling	4/20	4/20
Catches/stumpings	1/–	2/–
- Source: CricketArchive, 28 February 2022

Levona P Lewis (born 15 November 1972) is a South African former cricketer who played as a left-arm medium bowler. She appeared in nine One Day Internationals for South Africa in 1999 and 2000. She played domestic cricket for Western Province.
