= CSA Women's One-Day Cup =

South African women's cricket competition

- Countries: South Africa
- Administrator: Cricket South Africa
- Format: Limited overs cricket (50 overs per side)
- First edition: 1995–96
- Latest edition: 2022–23
- Tournament format: Divisions
- Number of teams: 16
- Current champion: Western Province (9th title)
- Most successful: Western Province (9 titles)
- 2023–24 CSA Women's One-Day Cup

The CSA Women's One-Day Cup, previously known as the CSA Women's Provincial Programme, is a women's domestic one-day cricket competition organised by Cricket South Africa. The competition currently sees sixteen provincial teams competing in 50-over matches, and has existed, under various names, since the 1995–96 season.

The most successful side in the history of the competition, and current holders, are Western Province, with nine recorded title wins.

== History ==
The tournament began in 1995–96 as the Women's Inter-Provincial Tournament, with four teams competing: Natal, Northerns, Transvaal and Western Province. The winner is unknown. This was the first women's domestic competition in South Africa since the Simon Trophy ended in 1986–87. The results of the following season's tournament are also unknown. In 1997–98, the tournament was named the Caltrate Inter-Provincial Tournament, and saw an expansion from six to twelve teams. A touring England Under-21s side won the competition. The 1998–99 tournament was won by Northerns, whilst the winners for the next four tournaments are unknown.

Ahead of 2003–04 season, the tournament was renamed the Women's Provincial League, with eleven teams competing: Boland, Border, Eastern Province, Easterns, Free State, Gauteng, Griqualand West, KwaZulu-Natal, Northerns, North West and Western Province, with Boland winning their first title. The following season, Limpopo and Mpumalanga joined the tournament, whilst South Western Districts joined in 2005–06, KwaZulu-Natal Inland in 2006–07 and Kei in 2010–11. Griqualand West was renamed Northern Cape ahead of the 2015–16 season. During this period, Western Province were the most successful team, winning eight titles, including four in a row between 2012–13 and 2015–16.

Ahead of the 2019–20 season, KwaZulu-Natal became KwaZulu-Natal Coastal and Gauteng became Central Gauteng. The end of the season was curtailed due to the COVID-19 pandemic, with North West being declared the winners based on results up until the tournament being cut short. After an initial attempt at the 2020–21 season was also cancelled due to COVID-19, the tournament was renamed the Women's Provincial Programme and went ahead in February 2021, with an altered format. Teams competed in groups based at separate venues, with Western Province and KwaZulu-Natal Coastal winning the two top groups. The 2021–22 edition of the tournament saw a return to its previous format, with North West claiming their fourth title. Western Province won the 2021–22 edition of the tournament.

In August 2023, as part of the legacy of South Africa hosting the 2023 ICC Women's T20 World Cup, Cricket South Africa announced the introduction of a new "professional domestic system" for women's cricket. Whilst maintaining much of the structure of the tournament, the teams in the Top 6 Division would now have eleven professional players (up from six), alongside full-time coaching staff. The tournament was renamed the CSA Women's One-Day Cup (aligning with the men's tournament) as part of the changes.

Matches in the tournament are played with 50 overs per side, with sixteen teams competing. The tournament has had various formats over the years, but currently has a top tier "Top 6" league, with the winner of the league winning the competition, and two lower Pools, A and B, with promotion and relegation. Teams in the top division play each other twice, whilst teams in the lower pools play each other once.

== Teams ==
Team	First	Last	Titles
Boland	1997–98	2022–23	2
Border	1997–98	2022–23	0
Central Gauteng (Lions)	1997–98	2022–23	1
Combined Provinces	1998–99	1998–99	0
Conrad Hunte XI	1999–00	1999–00	0
Eastern Province	1996–97	2022–23	0
Easterns	1997–98	2022–23	0
England Under-21s	1997–98	1997–98	1
Free State	1996–97	2022–23	0
Kei	2010–11	2022–23	0
KwaZulu-Natal Coastal	1997–98	2022–23	1
KwaZulu-Natal Inland	2006–07	2022–23	0
Limpopo	2004–05	2022–23	0
Mpumalanga	2004–05	2022–23	0
Natal	1995–96	1996–97	0
Northern Cape	1997–98	2022–23	0
Northerns (Titans)	1996–97	2022–23	3
Northern Transvaal	1996–97	1996–97	0
North West (Dragons)	1996–97	2022–23	4
South Africa Women's Cricket Association Invitation XI	2002–03	2002–03	0
South Western Districts	2005–06	2022–23	0
Transvaal	1995–96	1995–96	0
Western Province	1995–96	2022–23	9
Western Province B	2000–01	2001–02	0
Women's Invitation XI	1998–99	1998–99	0

== Results ==
Season	Winners	Runners-up	Ref
1995–96	Unknown	Unknown	
1996–97	Unknown	Unknown	
1997–98	England Under-21s	Western Province	
1998–99	Northerns	North West	
1999–00	Unknown	Unknown	
2000–01	Unknown	Unknown	
2001–02	Unknown	Unknown	
2002–03	Unknown	Unknown	
2003–04	Boland	Eastern Province	
2004–05	Gauteng	Border	
2005–06	Western Province	Boland	
2006–07	Western Province	Boland	
2007–08	Boland	KwaZulu-Natal	
2008–09	Western Province	Boland	
2009–10	KwaZulu-Natal	Western Province	
2010–11	Northerns	KwaZulu-Natal	
2011–12	Northerns	Western Province	
2012–13	Western Province	Gauteng	
2013–14	Western Province	KwaZulu-Natal	
2014–15	Western Province	Northerns	
2015–16	Western Province	Gauteng	
2016–17	North West	Gauteng	
2017–18	Western Province	Gauteng	
2018–19	North West	Western Province	
2019–20	North West	Western Province	
2020–21	No overall winner (Note: The top division was separated into two groups due to COVID-19 protocols.)		
2021–22	North West	Western Province	
2022–23	Western Province	KwaZulu-Natal Coastal	

== See also ==
- CSA Women's T20 Challenge
- CSA Provincial Competitions
