= Karin Swart =

South African cricketer

Personal information
- Full name: Karin Swart
- Role: Bowler

International information
- National side: South Africa (1997)
- ODI debut (cap 19): 16 December 1997 v Pakistan
- Last ODI: 22 December 1997 v India

Domestic team information
- Years: Team
- 1996/97–1997/98: Northerns

Career statistics
Competition	WODI
Matches	3
Runs scored	0
Batting average	0.00
100s/50s	0/0
Top score	0
Balls bowled	72
Wickets	2
Bowling average	16.50
5 wickets in innings	0
10 wickets in match	0
Best bowling	2/23
Catches/stumpings	0/–
- Source: CricketArchive, 26 February 2022

Karin Swart is a South African former cricketer who played as a bowler. She appeared in three One Day Internationals for South Africa in 1997, all at the 1997 World Cup. She played domestic cricket for Northerns.
