= Leslie Korkie =

South African cricketer (born 1969)

Personal information
- Full name: Leslie Korkie
- Born: 29 August 1969 (age 57); Bloemfontein, South Africa
- Batting: Right-handed
- Bowling: Right-arm off break, right-arm medium
- Role: Batter

International information
- National side: South Africa (1997–1999)
- ODI debut (cap 12): 7 August 1997 v Ireland
- Last ODI: 17 February 1999 v New Zealand

Domestic team information
- Years: Team
- 1996/97–1997/98: Free State

Career statistics
Competition	WODI	WFC	WLA
Matches	7	1	10
Runs scored	20	31	87
Batting average	4.00	31.00	10.87
100s/50s	0/0	0/0	0/0
Top score	12	31	49
Balls bowled	24	36	108
Wickets	0	0	0
Bowling average	–	–	–
5 wickets in innings	0	0	0
10 wickets in match	0	0	0
Best bowling	–	–	–
Catches/stumpings	1/–	0/–	2/–
- Source: CricketArchive, 23 February 2022

Leslie Korkie (born 29 August 1969) is a South African former cricketer who played as a right-handed batter. She appeared in seven One Day Internationals for South Africa between 1997 and 1999. She played domestic cricket for Free State.
