= Belinda Dermota =

South African cricketer (born 1971)

Personal information
- Full name: Belinda Dermota
- Born: 28 June 1971 (age 55); South Africa
- Batting: Right-handed
- Bowling: Right-arm medium
- Role: Bowler

International information
- National side: South Africa (1997)
- ODI debut (cap 17): 12 December 1997 v Australia
- Last ODI: 18 December 1997 v Denmark

Domestic team information
- Years: Team
- 1997/98: Western Province

Career statistics
Competition	WODI
Matches	3
Runs scored	0
Batting average	0.00
100s/50s	0/0
Top score	0
Balls bowled	12
Wickets	0
Bowling average	–
5 wickets in innings	0
10 wickets in match	0
Best bowling	–
Catches/stumpings	0/–
- Source: CricketArchive, 1 March 2022

Belinda Dermota (born 28 June 1971) is a South African former cricketer who played as a right-arm medium bowler. She appeared in three One Day Internationals for South Africa, all at the 1997 World Cup. She played domestic cricket for Western Province.
