= Melissa Smook =

South African cricketer (born 1989)

Personal information
- Full name: Melissa Smook
- Born: 22 June 1989 (age 37); Johannesburg, South Africa
- Batting: Right-handed
- Bowling: Right-arm medium
- Role: Bowler

International information
- National side: South Africa (2011)
- T20I debut (cap 27): 27 October 2011 v England
- Last T20I: 30 October 2011 v England

Domestic team information
- Years: Team
- 2005/06–2007/08: Gauteng
- 2008/09–2010/11: Northerns

Career statistics
Competition	WT20I	WLA	WT20
Matches	3	31	7
Runs scored	2	250	6
Batting average	–	14.70	3.00
100s/50s	0/0	0/0	0/0
Top score	2*	40*	3
Balls bowled	12	1,157	84
Wickets	0	39	2
Bowling average	–	15.20	44.00
5 wickets in innings	0	1	0
10 wickets in match	0	0	0
Best bowling	–	6/2	1/8
Catches/stumpings	0/–	10/–	1/–
- Source: CricketArchive, 20 February 2022

Melissa Smook (born 22 June 1989) is a South African former cricketer who played as a right-arm medium bowler. She appeared in three Twenty20 Internationals for South Africa, all in 2011 against England. She played domestic cricket for Gauteng and Northerns.
