= Alicia Bezuidenhout =

South African cricketer (born 1967)

Personal information
- Full name: Alicia Louise Bezuidenhout
- Born: 11 September 1967 (age 59); Klerksdorp, Transvaal, South Africa
- Batting: Right-handed
- Bowling: Right-arm off break
- Role: Bowler

International information
- National side: South Africa (1997)
- ODI debut (cap 1): 5 August 1997 v Ireland
- Last ODI: 12 December 1997 v Australia

Domestic team information
- Years: Team
- 1996/97: North West

Career statistics
Competition	WODI	WFC	WLA
Matches	6	1	7
Runs scored	21	–	21
Batting average	10.50	–	10.50
100s/50s	0/0	–	0/0
Top score	17	–	17
Balls bowled	60	12	60
Wickets	1	0	1
Bowling average	53.00	–	53.00
5 wickets in innings	0	0	0
10 wickets in match	0	0	0
Best bowling	1/40	–	1/40
Catches/stumpings	0/–	0/–	0/–
- Source: CricketArchive, 6 March 2022

Alicia Louise Bezuidenhout (born 11 September 1967) is a South African former cricketer who played as a right-arm off break bowler. She appeared in six One Day Internationals for South Africa in 1997. She played domestic cricket for North West.
