= Wea Skog =

South African cricketer (born 1938)

Personal information
- Full name: Wilhelmina H Skog
- Born: 1938 (age 87–88); Cape Town, South Africa
- Role: Bowler

International information
- National side: South Africa (1972)
- Test debut (cap 20): 25 February 1972 v New Zealand
- Last Test: 24 March 1972 v New Zealand

Domestic team information
- Years: Team
- 1968/69: Western Province
- 1971/72–1983/84: Southern Transvaal

Career statistics
Competition	WTest
Matches	3
Runs scored	19
Batting average	19.00
100s/50s	0/0
Top score	11*
Balls bowled	420
Wickets	3
Bowling average	42.00
5 wickets in innings	0
10 wickets in match	0
Best bowling	1/24
Catches/stumpings	1/–
- Source: CricketArchive, 2 March 2022

Wilhelmina H Skog (born 1938) is a South African former cricketer who played as a bowler. She appeared in three Test matches for South Africa in 1972, all against New Zealand, taking three wickets. She played domestic cricket for Western Province and Southern Transvaal.
