= Juanita van Zyl =

South African cricketer

Personal information
- Full name: Juanita van Zyl
- Born: Port Elizabeth, South Africa
- Role: Batter

International information
- National side: South Africa (1972)
- Only Test (cap 21): 25 February 1972 v New Zealand

Domestic team information
- Years: Team
- 1958/59–1960/61: Eastern Province
- 1971/72–1975/76: Western Province

Career statistics
Competition	WTest
Matches	1
Runs scored	6
Batting average	6.00
100s/50s	0/0
Top score	6
Catches/stumpings	1/–
- Source: CricketArchive, 22 February 2022

Juanita van Zyl is a South African former cricketer who played primarily as a batter. She appeared in one Test match for South Africa in 1972, scoring 6 runs against New Zealand. She played domestic cricket for Eastern Province and Western Province.
