= Anina Burger =

South African cricketer (born 1967)

Personal information
- Full name: Anna Adrianna Burger
- Born: 25 August 1967 (age 59); Cape Town, South Africa
- Batting: Right-handed
- Role: Batter

International information
- National side: South Africa (1997–2000)
- ODI debut (cap 2): 5 August 1997 v Ireland
- Last ODI: 18 December 2000 v Australia

Domestic team information
- Years: Team
- 1995/96–1998/99: Northerns

Career statistics
Competition	WODI	WFC	WLA
Matches	18	1	22
Runs scored	259	10	278
Batting average	19.92	10.00	16.35
100s/50s	0/1	0/0	0/1
Top score	52*	10	52*
Catches/stumpings	6/–	0/–	8/–
- Source: CricketArchive, 26 February 2022

Anna Adriana Burger (born 25 August 1967) is a South African former cricketer who played as a right-handed batter. She appeared in 18 One Day Internationals for South Africa between 1997 and 2000. She played domestic cricket for Northerns.
