= Bernadine Bezuidenhout =

Cricketer (born 1993)

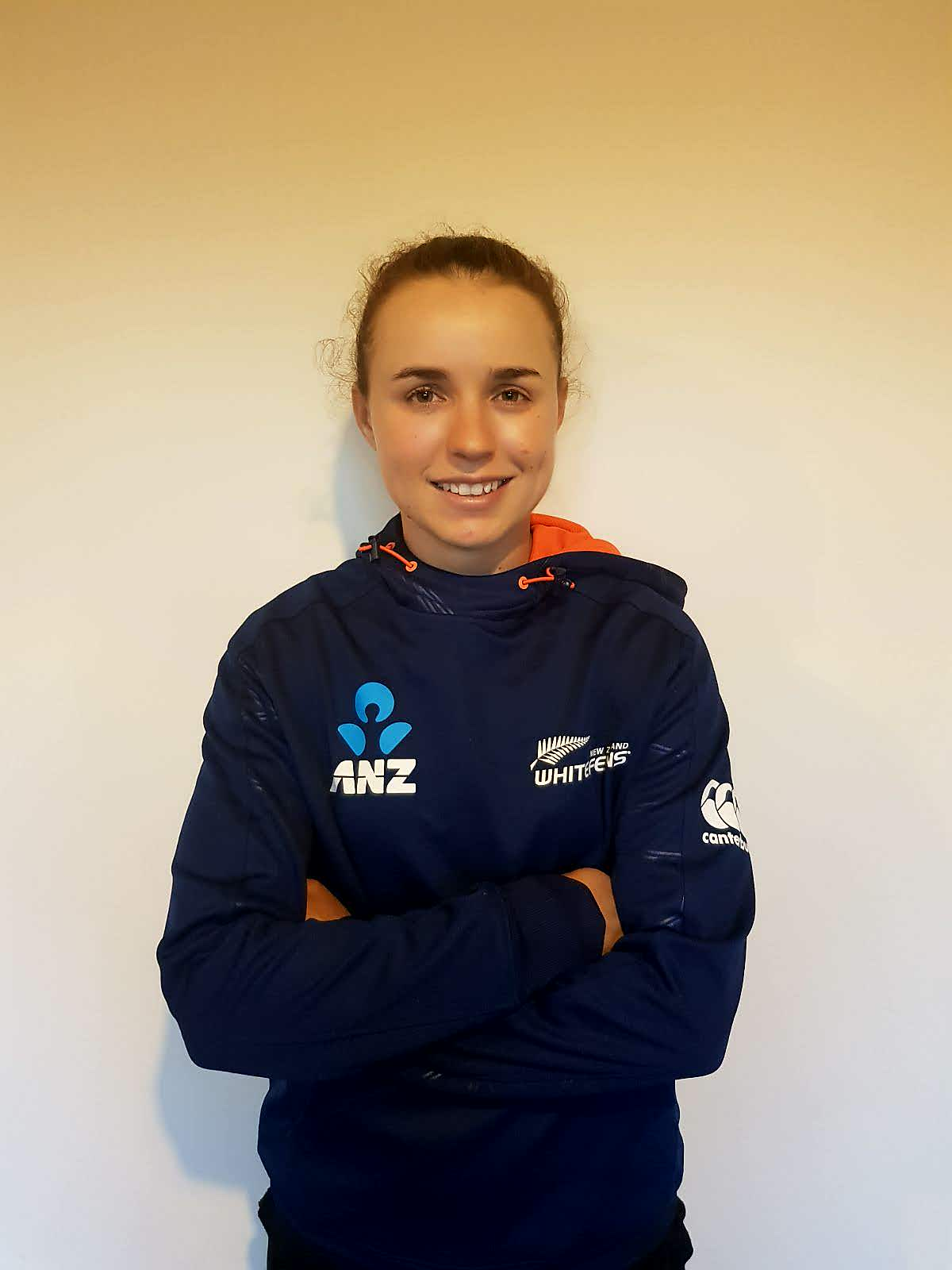

Personal information
- Full name: Bernadine Michelle Bezuidenhout
- Born: 14 September 1993 (age 33); Kimberley, Northern Cape, South Africa
- Batting: Right-handed
- Role: Wicket-keeper

International information
- National sides: South Africa (2014–2015); New Zealand (2018–2024)
- ODI debut (cap 70/137): 15 October 2014; South Africa v Sri Lanka
- Last ODI: 4 April 2024; New Zealand v England
- ODI shirt no.: 12
- T20I debut (cap 37/51): 7 September 2014; South Africa v England
- Last T20I: 29 March 2024; New Zealand v England
- T20I shirt no.: 12

Domestic team information
- Years: Team
- 2005/06–2006/07: Griqualand West
- 2007/08: Eastern Province
- 2008/09–2012/13: South Western Districts
- 2012/13: Boland
- 2013/14–2014/15: Western Province
- 2016/17–2019/20: Northern Districts
- 2022/23–present: Northern Districts

Career statistics
Competition	WODI	WT20I
Matches	20	29
Runs scored	291	299
Batting average	19.40	13.00
100s/50s	0/1	0/0
Top score	86	44
Catches/stumpings	11/1	7/3
- Source: ESPNcricinfo, 31 May 2024

Bernadine Michelle Bezuidenhout (born 14 September 1993) is a South African-born former international cricketer who currently plays for Northern Districts. During her international career she played for both South Africa and New Zealand.

== Career ==
Bezuidenhout played for the South Africa national women's cricket team in 2014 and 2015 before moving to Christchurch, New Zealand and switching to represent New Zealand, after a three-year stand-down period. On 6 May 2018, she made her Women's Twenty20 International (WT20I) debut for New Zealand against Ireland.

In August 2018, she was awarded a central contract by New Zealand Cricket, following the tours of Ireland and England in the previous months. In October 2018, Bezuidenhout was named in New Zealand's squad for the 2018 ICC Women's World Twenty20 tournament in the West Indies.

She was named in the New Zealand squad for the 2023 ICC Women's T20 World Cup in South Africa.

On 31 May 2024, Bezuidenhout announced her retirement from international cricket.

== Personal life ==
Bezuidenhout was diagnosed with Relative Energy Deficiency in Sport (RED-S) in 2018. She founded non-profit, social enterprise Epic Sports Project which provides free sport and dance lessons to vulnerable young people.
