= Lizelle Lee =

South African cricketer (born 1992)

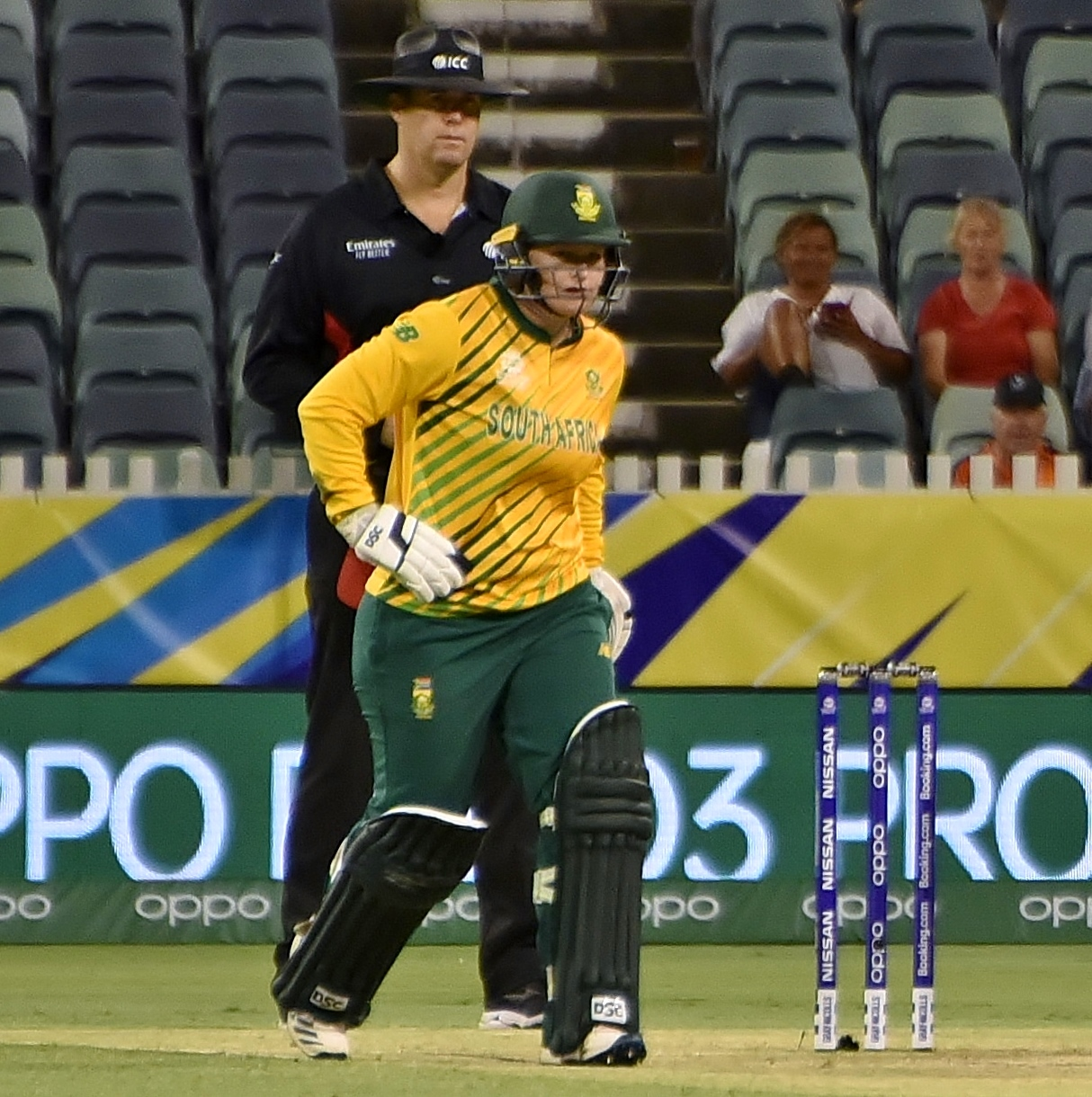
- Lee batting for South Africa during the 2020 ICC Women's T20 World Cup

Personal information
- Full name: Lizelle Lee
- Born: 2 April 1992 (age 34); Ermelo, South Africa
- Batting: Right-handed
- Bowling: Right-arm medium-fast
- Role: Wicket-keeper-batter

International information
- National side: South Africa (2013–2022)
- Test debut (cap 53): 16 November 2014 v India
- Last Test: 27 June 2022 v England
- ODI debut (cap 67): 20 September 2013 v Bangladesh
- Last ODI: 31 March 2022 v England
- ODI shirt no.: 67
- T20I debut (cap 35): 12 September 2013 v Bangladesh
- Last T20I: 4 September 2021 v West Indies

Domestic team information
- Years: Team
- 2007/08–2011/12: Mpumalanga
- 2010/11–2018/19: North West
- 2015–2016: Somerset
- 2016: Western Storm
- 2017–2019: Surrey Stars
- 2017/18–2019/20: Melbourne Stars
- 2020/21: Melbourne Renegades
- 2021–2022: Manchester Originals
- 2022/23–present: Tasmania Tigers
- 2022/23–present: Hobart Hurricanes
- 2023: Trent Rockets
- 2023: The Blaze

Career statistics
Competition	WTest	WODI	WT20I
Matches	2	100	82
Runs scored	42	3,315	1,896
Batting average	10.50	36.42	25.62
100s/50s	0/0	3/23	1/13
Top score	36	132*	101
Balls bowled	–	119	42
Wickets	–	3	0
Bowling average	–	31.00	–
5 wickets in innings	–	0	0
10 wickets in match	–	–	–
Best bowling	–	2/12	–
Catches/stumpings	1/–	53/4	29/1
- Source: Cricinfo, 30 June 2022

Lizelle Lee (born 2 April 1992) is a South African cricketer who played for the South Africa women's national cricket team from 2013 to 2022. She has played for Western Storm and Surrey Stars in the Women's Cricket Super League, as well as Melbourne Stars, Melbourne Renegades and Hobart Hurricanes in the Women's Big Bash League. Lee is an opening batter. In January 2022, Lee was named the ICC Women's ODI Cricketer of the Year. In July 2022, Lee announced her retirement from international cricket.

== Domestic and franchise career ==
Lee has played for Western Storm and Surrey Stars in the English Women's Cricket Super League. She was part of the Stars team that lost their 2017 Women's Cricket Super League semi-final to Western Storm. In the 2018 Women's Cricket Super League final, Lee scored 104 off 58 balls to help the Stars beat Loughborough Lightning. In September 2019, she was named in the M van der Merwe XI squad for the inaugural edition of the Women's T20 Super League in South Africa.

Lee represented Melbourne Stars for three seasons in the Australian Women's Big Bash League (WBBL). She made 40 appearances for the Stars, scoring 1,100 runs. In her first match of the 2018–19 Women's Big Bash League season, Lee scored 102* from 56 balls. It was her third career century in Twenty20 cricket, and her first in the WBBL. Ahead of the 2020–21 Women's Big Bash League season Lee joined Melbourne Renegades, replacing Jess Duffin who was on maternity leave. In 2021, she was drafted by Manchester Originals for the inaugural season of The Hundred. She was the leading run scorer of Manchester Originals with 215 runs in the tournament.

In April 2022, she was bought by the Manchester Originals for the 2022 season of The Hundred. In 2023, she signed for Trent Rockets for The Hundred and for The Blaze's Rachael Heyhoe Flint Trophy matches in September. On 10 November 2024, while playing for the Hobart Hurricanes, Lee scored a record breaking 150* runs off 75 balls being unbeaten as the crease.

In her third season with the Hobart Hurricanes, Lee broke multiple WBBL records in WBBL|10, these are: the highest score in an innings 150* off 75 balls, the most sixes in an innings (12) and is the first and only player to score back to back WBBL centuries (150* & 103).

On 8 October 2025, Lee scored 187 off 141 while playing for the Tasmanian Tigers in the WNCL. Lee achieved the second highest score ever in an innings in the WNCL as well as breaking the team records for highest partnership scored, with Rachel Trenaman, and highest score in an innings.

== Domestic and Franchise Cricket centuries ==
Women's Big Bash League centuries
Runs	Team	Venue	Season
102*	Melbourne Stars	CitiPower Centre, St Kilda	2018/19
103*	Melbourne Stars	WACA Ground, Perth	2019/20
101	Hobart Hurricanes	Bellerive Oval, Hobart	2023/24
150*	Hobart Hurricanes	Sydney Cricket Ground, Sydney	2024/25
103	Hobart Hurricanes	Bellerive Oval, Hobart	2024/25

T20 Spring Challenge centuries
Runs	Team	Venue	Season
112*	Hobart Hurricanes	Karen Rolton Oval, Adelaide	2024

Women's National Cricket League centuries
Runs	Team	Venue	Season
106*	Tasmanian Tigers	Bellerive Oval, Hobart	2022/23
187	Tasmanian Tigers	CitiPower Centre, St Kilda	2025/26

Women's Cricket Super League centuries
Runs	Team	Venue	Season
104	Surrey Stars	County Ground, Hove	2018

CSA Women's T20 Challenge centuries
Runs	Team	Venue	Season
169*	North West Dragons	N.F. Oppenheimer Ground, Randjesfontein	2013

CSA U-19 Girls Week One-Day Cup centuries
Runs	Team	Venue	Season	Notes
427*	Mpumalanga Women Under-19	Mangaung Oval, Bloemfontein	2010/11	Highest recorded score in any form of women's organised cricket. Reported By credible source ESPN.

== International career ==
Lee made her debut for the South Africa women's national cricket team against Bangladesh in 2013. In March 2018, she was one of fourteen players to be awarded a national contract by Cricket South Africa ahead of the 2018–19 season. In May 2018, during the series against Bangladesh Women, she became the third player for South Africa Women to score 2,000 runs in WODIs.

In October 2018, she was named in South Africa's squad for the 2018 ICC Women's World Twenty20 tournament in the West Indies. In February 2019, Lee was withdrawn from the South Africa squad for their series against Sri Lanka due to fitness concerns. Later in the year, Lee scored 75* off 48 balls in the fifth match of the 2019 series against Pakistan to help South Africa win the series 3–2. In October 2019, Lee scored 84 from 47 balls in South Africa's fifth T20I in India. South Africa won the match by 105 runs, but lost the series 3–1.

In January 2020, she was named in South Africa's squad for the 2020 ICC Women's T20 World Cup in Australia. In South Africa's match against Thailand, Lee scored her first century in WT20I cricket, with 101 runs. It was the fastest century by a South African woman in Twenty20 cricket. On 23 July 2020, Lee was named in South Africa's 24-woman squad to begin training in Pretoria, ahead of their tour to England.

In February 2022, she was named in South Africa's team for the 2022 Women's Cricket World Cup in New Zealand. On 31 March 2022, in the semi-final match against England, Lee played in her 100th WODI match.

In July 2022, Lee announced her retirement from international cricket.

== International centuries ==
One Day International centuries
Runs	Match	Opponents	City	Venue	Year
102	36	Australia	Sydney, Australia	North Sydney Oval	2016
117	69	England	Hove, England	County Ground	2018
132*	88	India	Lucknow, India	BRSABV Ekana Cricket Stadium	2021

T20 International centuries
Runs	Match	Opponents	City	Venue	Year
101	72	Thailand	Canberra, Australia	Manuka Oval	2020

== Personal life ==
Lee married long-term partner Tanja Cronje in September 2020. Their wedding had been planned for April 2020, but was postponed due to the COVID-19 pandemic. Lee and Cronje had their first child in 2022. In 2024, Lee and her wife Tanja officially became Australian permanent residents, having made Tasmania their home following the wicketkeeper-batter's retirement from playing international cricket for South Africa. She is now considered as a local player in the WBBL, rather than an overseas player.

== See also ==
- List of centuries in women's One Day International cricket
- List of centuries in women's Twenty20 International cricket
