= CSA Women's T20 Challenge =

South African women's cricket competition

- Countries: South Africa
- Administrator: Cricket South Africa
- Format: Twenty20
- First edition: 2012–13
- Latest edition: 2022–23
- Tournament format: Divisions
- Number of teams: 16
- Current champion: Central Gauteng (1st title)
- Most successful: Western Province (7 titles)
- 2023–24 CSA Women's T20 Challenge

The CSA Women's T20 Challenge, previously known as the CSA Women's Provincial T20 Competition, is a women's domestic Twenty20 cricket competition organised by Cricket South Africa. The tournament began in the 2012–13 season, and currently sees sixteen teams competing.

Western Province are the most successful side in the history of the competition, with seven title wins. Central Gauteng are the current holders, winning the 2022–23 tournament.

== History ==
The tournament began in the 2012–13 season, running alongside the CSA Women's Provincial League. Sixteen teams competed in four groups, with the group winners progressing to the knockout rounds. Western Province won the competition, beating Gauteng in the final. The following tournament, 2013–14, was won by Boland, who beat Northerns in the final.

Western Province then went on to win the next four competitions, between 2014–15 and 2017–18. North West ended their run in 2018–19, winning all five of their matches to win their first T20 title. The 2019–20 season was ended prematurely due to the COVID-19 pandemic, but was won by Western Province based on results that had occurred before the tournament was cut short.

The 2020–21 season was cancelled due to the ongoing COVID-19 pandemic. The tournament returned for the 2021–22 season, beginning in January 2022, with Western Province winning their seventh T20 title. Central Gauteng won their first title in 2022–23.

In August 2023, as part of the legacy of South Africa hosting the 2023 ICC Women's T20 World Cup, Cricket South Africa announced the introduction of a new "professional domestic system" for women's cricket. Whilst maintaining much of the structure of the tournament, the teams in the Top 6 Division would now have eleven professional players (up from six), alongside full-time coaching staff. The tournament was renamed the CSA Women's T20 Challenge (aligning with the men's tournament) as part of the changes.

Matches in the tournament are played using a Twenty20 format, with sixteen teams competing. Currently, the tournament has a top tier "Top 6" league, with the winner of the league winning the competition, and two lower Pools, A and B, with promotion and relegation. Teams in the top division play each other twice, whilst teams in the lower pools play each other once.

== Teams ==
Team	First	Last	Titles
Boland	2012–13	2022–23	1
Border	2012–13	2022–23	0
Central Gauteng (Lions)	2012–13	2022–23	1
Eastern Province	2012–13	2022–23	0
Easterns	2012–13	2022–23	0
Free State	2012–13	2022–23	0
Kei	2012–13	2022–23	0
KwaZulu-Natal Coastal	2012–13	2022–23	0
KwaZulu-Natal Inland	2012–13	2022–23	0
Limpopo	2012–13	2022–23	0
Mpumalanga	2012–13	2022–23	0
Northern Cape	2012–13	2022–23	0
Northerns (Titans)	2012–13	2022–23	0
North West (Dragons)	2012–13	2022–23	1
South Western Districts	2012–13	2022–23	0
Western Province	2012–13	2022–23	7

== Results ==
Season	Winners	Runners-up	Ref
2012–13	Western Province	Gauteng	
2013–14	Boland	Northerns	
2014–15	Western Province	Boland	
2015–16	Western Province	Northerns	
2016–17	Western Province	Gauteng	
2017–18	Western Province	North West	
2018–19	North West	Western Province	
2019–20	Western Province	North West	
2020–21	Tournament cancelled due to the COVID-19 pandemic		
2021–22	Western Province	Central Gauteng	
2022–23	Central Gauteng	Western Province	

== See also ==
- CSA Women's One-Day Cup
- Women's T20 Super League
- CSA Provincial Competitions
