= Susan Benade =

South African cricketer (born 1982)

Personal information
- Full name: Susanna Maria Benade
- Born: 16 February 1982 (age 44); Lichtenburg, Transvaal, South Africa
- Batting: Right-handed
- Bowling: Right-arm medium-fast
- Role: All-rounder

International information
- National side: South Africa (2005–2013)
- Only Test (cap 43): 28 July 2007 v Netherlands
- ODI debut (cap 43): 30 March 2005 v England
- Last ODI: 8 February 2013 v West Indies
- T20I debut (cap 1): 10 August 2007 v New Zealand
- Last T20I: 19 January 2013 v West Indies

Domestic team information
- Years: Team
- 2003/04–2009/10: Free State
- 2010/11–present: Northern Cape

Career statistics
Competition	WTest	WODI	WT20I
Matches	1	29	19
Runs scored	51	414	274
Batting average	25.50	15.33	16.11
100s/50s	0/1	0/1	0/1
Top score	51	58	53*
Balls bowled	24	877	288
Wickets	2	19	13
Bowling average	0.50	31.63	22.46
5 wickets in innings	0	0	0
10 wickets in match	0	0	0
Best bowling	2/1	2/11	2/7
Catches/stumpings	1/–	9/–	5/–
- Source: CricketArchive, 16 February 2022

Susanna Maria Benade (born 16 February 1982) is a South African cricketer who plays as a right-handed batter and right-arm medium-fast bowler for Northern Cape. She appeared in one Test match, 29 One Day Internationals and 19 Twenty20 Internationals for South Africa between 2005 and 2013. She has previously played domestic cricket for Free State.
