= North West women's cricket team =

South African women's cricket team

North West Women
Personnel
- Captain: Nthabiseng Nini
- Coach: Wynand Schmitt

Team information
- Founded: Unknown First recorded match: 1996
- Home ground: Senwes Park, Potchefstroom

History
- ODC wins: 4
- T20 wins: 1
- Official website: North West Cricket

The North West women's cricket team, also known as North West Dragons, is the women's representative cricket team for the South African province of North West. They compete in the CSA Women's One-Day Cup and the CSA Women's T20 Challenge.

== History ==
North West Women first played in the 1996–97 season, appearing in the Women's Inter-Provincial Tournament. They have competed in the provincial one-day tournament ever since. They finished as runners-up in the 1998–99 tournament, losing in the final to Northerns. They joined the CSA Women's Provincial T20 Competition for its inaugural year in 2012–13.

They won their first one-day title in 2016–17, beating Gauteng in the final, where Lizelle Lee scored 84 and took 4/20 from 4.3 overs. They won their second title two seasons later, in 2018–19, this time beating Western Province in the final. That season they completed the double by winning their first T20 title, going unbeaten in the tournament. The following season, 2019–20, they retained their one-day title, by virtue of topping the group on average points when the season was curtailed due to the COVID-19 pandemic. When the T20 Competition was similarly curtailed, North West ended as runners-up. In 2021–22, they claimed their fourth one-day title, winning the Top 6 league of the Women's Provincial Programme. However, in 2022–23, they finished bottom of the Top 6 league in the Women's Provincial Programme, meaning they were relegated in both the 50-over and T20 tournaments.

== Players ==
=== Notable players ===
Players who have played for North West and played internationally are listed below, in order of first international appearance (given in brackets):

- (South Africa) Alicia Bezuidenhout (1997)
- (South Africa) Cindy Eksteen (1997)
- (South Africa) Sunette Viljoen (2000)
- (South Africa) Cri-Zelda Brits (2002)
- (South Africa) Masabata Klaas (2010)
- (South Africa) Elriesa Theunissen-Fourie (2013)
- (South Africa) Lizelle Lee (2013)
- (South Africa) Sinalo Jafta (2016)
- (South Africa) Anneke Bosch (2016)
- (South Africa) Zintle Mali (2018)
- (South Africa) Tazmin Brits (2018)
- (South Africa) Tumi Sekhukhune (2018)
- (South Africa) Saarah Smith (2018)
- (Namibia) Sune Wittmann (2019)
- (South Africa) Delmi Tucker (2022)

== Honours ==
- CSA Women's One-Day Cup:
  - Winners (4): 2016–17, 2018–19, 2019–20 & 2021–22
- CSA Women's T20 Challenge:
  - Winners (1): 2018–19

== See also ==
- North West (cricket team)
