= Easterns women's cricket team =

South African women's cricket team

Easterns Women
Personnel
- Captain: Kayleigh Craig

Team information
- Founded: Unknown First recorded match: 1998
- Home ground: Willowmoore Park, Benoni

History
- ODC wins: 0
- T20 wins: 0
- Official website: Easterns Cricket

The Easterns women's cricket team, also known as Eastern Storm, is the women's representative cricket team for the South African region of East Rand. They compete in the CSA Women's One-Day Cup and the CSA Women's T20 Challenge.

== History ==
Easterns Women first appeared in the 1997–98 season of the Caltrate Inter-Provincial Tournament, although the full results for the tournament are unrecorded. They have competed in every season of the tournament since, with their best finish coming in the 2017–18, when they qualified for the knockout rounds and finished 7th overall. In 2019–20, they finished top of their group in the competition, setting up a promotion play-off match against Border, but the match was cancelled due to the COVID-19 pandemic and Border were promoted by virtue of their better group stage record.

They have also competed in the CSA Women's Provincial T20 Competition since its inception in 2012–13. They gained promotion in the 2019–20 season after topping their group with three wins from their four matches.

== Players ==
=== Notable players ===
Players who have played for Easterns and played internationally are listed below, in order of first international appearance (given in brackets):

- (South Africa) Cindy Eksteen (1997)
- (South Africa) Alta Kotze (1997)
- (South Africa) Kirsten Blair (2007)
- (South Africa) Odine Kirsten (2016)
- (South Africa) Tumi Sekhukhune (2018)
- (Netherlands) Madison Landsman (2024)

== Honours ==
- CSA Women's One-Day Cup:
  - Winners (0):
  - Best finish: 7th (2017–18)
- CSA Women's T20 Challenge:
  - Winners (0):
  - Best finish: 1st in Group (2019–20)

== See also ==
- Easterns (cricket team)
