= Free State women's cricket team =

South African women's cricket team

Free State Women
Personnel
- Captain: Zintle Kula
- Coach: Ruan Dercksen

Team information
- Founded: Unknown First recorded match: 1996
- Home ground: Mangaung Oval, Bloemfontein

History
- ODC wins: 0
- T20 wins: 0
- Official website: Knights Cricket

The Free State women's cricket team, also known as Recon Tactical Free State and previously known as Orange Free State women's cricket team, is the women's representative cricket team for the South African province of Free State. They compete in the CSA Women's One-Day Cup and the CSA Women's T20 Challenge.

== History ==
The side first played as Orange Free State in the 1952–53 season of the Simon Trophy, losing in the final of the competition. As Free State, they first appeared in the 1996–97 season of the Women's Inter-Provincial Tournament, although the full results for the tournament are unrecorded. They have competed in every season of the tournament since. They reached the quarter-finals of the competition in 2004–05, as well as finishing 4th in both 2007–08 and 2018–19.

They have also competed in the CSA Women's Provincial T20 Competition since its inception in 2012–13, including finishing 4th in the first competition. They have also finished third in the Top 6 league of the competition twice, in 2016–17 and 2019–20.

In the 2022–23 season, Free State topped Division 2 Pool A in the Women's Provincial Programme before defeating Northern Cape in the subsequent play-off to gain promotion. In August 2023, it was announced that a new professional domestic system would be implemented for women's cricket in South Africa. Therefore, as one of the six teams in the top division of the two domestic competitions, Free State would be allowed eleven professional players from the 2023–24 season onwards.

== Players ==
=== Current squad ===
Based on appearances in the 2023–24 season. Players in bold have international caps.

Name	Nationality	Notes			
Name	Nationality	Notes	Zintle Kula	South Africa	Club captain
Elandri Janse van Rensburg	South Africa				
Pretty Molefe	South Africa				
Mampe Ntsane	South Africa				
**Yolandi Potgieter**	South Africa				
Verunissa Reddy	South Africa				
**Miane Smit**	South Africa				
Anica Swart	South Africa				
Mignon van der Merwe	South Africa				
Christen van Wyk	South Africa				
Evodia Yekile	South Africa				
Yamkela Zangqa	South Africa				

=== Notable players ===
Players who have played for Free State and played internationally are listed below, in order of first international appearance (given in brackets):

- (South Africa) Cindy Eksteen (1997)
- (South Africa) Leslie Korkie (1997)
- (South Africa) Cri-Zelda Brits (2002)
- (South Africa) Susan Benade (2005)
- (South Africa) Annelie Minny (2007)
- (South Africa) Masabata Klaas (2010)
- (South Africa) Yolandi Potgieter (2013)
- (South Africa) Anneke Bosch (2016)
- (South Africa) Annerie Dercksen (2023)
- (United Arab Emirates) Michelle Botha (2025)
- (South Africa) Miane Smit (2025)

== Honours ==
- CSA Women's One-Day Cup:
  - Winners (0):
  - Best finish: 4th (2007–08 & 2018–19)
- CSA Women's T20 Challenge:
  - Winners (0):
  - Best finish: 3rd (2016–17 & 2019–20)

== See also ==
- Free State (cricket team)
