= Mpumalanga women's cricket team =

South African women's cricket team

Mpumalanga Women
Personnel
- Captain: Jennifer Hall

Team information
- Founded: Unknown First recorded match: 2004
- Home ground: Various

History
- ODC wins: 0
- T20 wins: 0
- Official website: Mpumalanga Cricket

The Mpumalanga women's cricket team is the women's representative cricket team for the South African province of Mpumalanga. They compete in the CSA Women's One-Day Cup and the CSA Women's T20 Challenge.

== History ==
Mpumalanga Women joined the South African domestic system in the 2004–05 season, competing in the Women's Provincial League. In their first season, they finished bottom of their group of four, losing all six of their matches. They have competed in the tournament ever since, but have never made it out of the initial group stage. The side has also competed in the CSA Women's Provincial T20 Competition since its inception in 2012–13, but have again never made it out of the initial group stages. Their best performances have come in recent seasons, winning three of their four matches in both the 2018–19 and 2019–20 tournaments.

== Players ==
=== Notable players ===
Players who have played for Mpumalanga and for South Africa internationally are listed below, in order of first international appearance (given in brackets):

- (South Africa) Lizelle Lee (2013)

== See also ==
- Mpumalanga (cricket team)
