= Western Province women's cricket team =

South African women's cricket team

Western Province Women
Personnel
- Captain: Leah Jones
- Coach: Claire Terblanche

Team information
- Founded: Unknown First recorded match: 1952
- Home ground: Newlands Cricket Ground, Cape Town; Old Mutual Sports Club Ground, Cape Town

History
- ODC wins: 9
- T20 wins: 7
- Official website: Western Province Cricket

The Western Province women's cricket team is the women's representative cricket team for part of the South African province of Western Cape, primarily based in Cape Town. They compete in the CSA Women's One-Day Cup and the CSA Women's T20 Challenge, and they are the most successful side in both competitions, with 9 and 7 title wins, respectively.

== History ==
Western Province Women first competed in the Simon Trophy between 1951–52 and 1975–76, winning the title a recorded three times. They joined the Inter-Provincial One-Day Tournament for its inaugural season in 1995–96, and have competed in every season since. They finished as runners-up to England Under-21s in 1997–98. The side won its first title in 2005–06, beating Boland in the final, before retaining their title the following season against the same opposition. They next won the tournament in 2008–09, before emerging victorious four years in a row between 2012–13 and 2015–16. They won their eighth title in 2017–18, before finishing as runners-up to North West in the following two seasons. In the 2020–21 season, due to COVID-19 protocols, there was no overall winner, but the side did win one of the two top tier groups, going unbeaten. They won their ninth one-day title in 2022–23.

Western Province Women have also competed in the CSA Women's Provincial T20 Competition since its inception in 2012–13, and won the inaugural tournament. They went on to win the tournament four times in a row between 2014–15 and 2017–18, and then won their sixth and seventh titles in 2019–20 and 2021–22.

In August 2023, it was announced that a new professional domestic system would be implemented for women's cricket in South Africa. As one of the six teams in the top division of the two domestic competitions, Western Province would be allowed eleven professional players from the 2023–24 season onwards.

== Current squad ==
Squad for 2026/27 Season. Players in bold have played international cricket.

Name	Nationality	Birth date	Batting style	Bowling style	Notes
Batters
**Lara Goodall**	South Africa	26 April 1996 (age 30)	Left-handed	Right-arm seam	
Yandiswa Mangele	South Africa	12 December 2001 (age 24)	Right-handed		
Oluhle Siyo	South Africa	31 January 2004 (age 22)	Right-handed	Right-arm seam	
**Faye Tunnicliffe**	South Africa	9 December 1998 (age 27)	Right-handed	Right-arm orthodox spin	
**Dané van Niekerk**	South Africa	14 May 1993 (age 33)	Right-handed	Right-arm wrist spin	
Keepers
**Jae-Leigh Filander**	South Africa	16 September 2007 (age 19)	Right-handed		
All-Rounders
Jemma Botha	South Africa	27 May 2007 (age 19)	Right-handed	Right-arm orthodox spin	
**Nadine de Klerk**	South Africa	16 January 2000 (age 26)	Right-handed	Right-arm seam	National Contract
**Marizanne Kapp**	South Africa	4 January 1990 (age 36)	Right-handed	Right-arm seam	National Contract
**Kayla Reyneke**	South Africa	21 October 2005 (age 20)	Right-handed	Right-arm orthodox spin	
**Delmi Tucker**	South Africa	5 March 1997 (age 29)	Right-handed	Right-arm orthodox spin	
Bowlers
Rifqah Esau	South Africa		Right-handed	Left-arm orthodox spin	High-performance Contract
**Leah Jones**	South Africa	7 March 2002 (age 24)	Right-handed	Right-arm seam	
Tatum le Roux	South Africa		Right-handed	Right-arm seam	High-performance Contract
Nosipho Vezi	South Africa	18 February 2001 (age 25)	Right-handed	Right-arm seam	

=== Notable players ===
Players who have played for Western Province and played internationally are listed below, in order of first international appearance (given in brackets):

- (South Africa) Sheelagh Nefdt (1960)
- (South Africa) Beverly Lang (1960)
- (South Africa) Maureen Payne (1960)
- (South Africa) Wea Skog (1972)
- (South Africa) Juanita van Zyl (1972)
- (South Africa) Denise Weyers (1972)
- (South Africa) Helen Davies (1997)
- (South Africa) Ally Kuylaars (1997)
- (South Africa) Kim Price (1997)
- (South Africa) Denise Reid (1997)
- (South Africa) Belinda Dermota (1997)
- (South Africa) Levona Lewis (1999)
- (South Africa) Sune van Zyl (1999)
- (South Africa) Alison Hodgkinson (2000)
- (South Africa) Cri-Zelda Brits (2002)
- (South Africa) Claire Cowan (2003)
- (South Africa) Leighshe Jacobs (2003)
- (South Africa) Shandre Fritz (2003)
- (South Africa) Ashlyn Kilowan (2003)
- (South Africa) Shabnim Ismail (2007)
- (South Africa) Olivia Anderson (2008)
- (South Africa) Yolandi van der Westhuizen (2009)
- (South Africa) Moseline Daniels (2010)
- (South Africa) Yolandi Potgieter (2013)
- (South Africa) Alexis le Breton (2013)
- (South Africa) Nadine Moodley (2013)
- (South Africa) (New Zealand) Bernadine Bezuidenhout (2014) (Note: Bezuidenhout represented both South Africa and New Zealand in international cricket.)
- (South Africa) Andrie Steyn (2014)
- (South Africa) Yolani Fourie (2014)
- (South Africa) Lara Goodall (2016)
- (South Africa) Laura Wolvaardt (2016)
- (South Africa) Sinalo Jafta (2016)
- (South Africa) Nadine de Klerk (2017)
- (South Africa) Stacy Lackay (2018)
- (Namibia) Yasmeen Khan (2018)
- (Netherlands) Babette de Leede (2018)
- (South Africa) Saarah Smith (2018)
- (South Africa) Faye Tunnicliffe (2018)
- (South Africa) Delmi Tucker (2022)
- (Italy) Alexia Kontopirakis (2025)

== Honours ==
- CSA Women's Provincial Programme:
  - Winners (9): 2005–06, 2006–07, 2008–09, 2012–13, 2013–14, 2014–15, 2015–16, 2017–18 & 2022–23
- CSA Women's Provincial T20 Competition:
  - Winners (7): 2012–13, 2014–15, 2015–16, 2016–17, 2017–18, 2019–20 & 2021–22

== See also ==
- Western Province (cricket team)
