= South Western Districts women's cricket team =

South African women's cricket team

South Western Districts Women
Personnel
- Captain: Jane Winster
- Coach: Martelize van der Merwe

Team information
- Founded: Unknown First recorded match: 2005
- Home ground: Recreation Ground, Oudtshoorn

History
- ODC wins: 0
- T20 wins: 0
- Official website: SWD Cricket

The South Western Districts women's cricket team, also known as the Six Gun Grill Garden Route Badgers, is the women's representative cricket team for part of the South African province of Western Cape. They compete in the CSA Women's One-Day Cup and the CSA Women's T20 Challenge.

== History ==
South Western Districts Women joined the South African domestic system ahead of the 2005–06 season, playing in the Women's Provincial League, in which they finished 6th in their group of 7 with one win from their twelve matches. They have competed in the tournament ever since, but have never reached the knockout stages. In the 2008–09 season, they won the B Section Group, but lost the promotion/relegation play-off to Eastern Province. In 2021–22, the side topped Pool A before beating Free State in a play-off to gain promotion to the Top 6 for the first time.

They have also competed in the CSA Women's Provincial T20 Competition since its inception in 2012–13, but again have never made it to the knockout rounds.

In August 2023, it was announced that a new professional domestic system would be implemented for women's cricket in South Africa. As one of the six teams in the top division of the two domestic competitions, South Western Districts would be allowed eleven professional players from the 2023–24 season onwards.

== Players ==
=== Current squad ===
Squad for 2026/27 Season. Players in bold have played international cricket.

Name	Nationality	Birth date	Batting style	Bowling style	Notes
Batters
Izel Cilliers	South Africa	12 May 1997 (age 29)	Right-handed	Right-arm orthodox spin	
**Mignon Du Preez**	South Africa	13 June 1989 (age 37)	Right-handed		
Aluncedo Dunga	South Africa	18 April 2002 (age 24)	Left-handed	Right-arm seam	
Courtney Gounden	South Africa	1 September 2001 (age 24)	Left-handed		
Keepers
**Babette de Leede**	Netherlands	8 October 1999 (age 26)	Right-handed		High-performance Contract
Verunissa Reddy	South Africa	29 October 1996 (age 29)	Right-handed		
All-Rounders
**Annerie Dercksen**	South Africa	26 April 2001 (age 25)	Right-handed	Right-arm seam	National Contract
Nicolien Janse van Rensburg	South Africa	22 January 2002 (age 24)	Right-handed	Right-arm seam	
Zintle Kula	South Africa	23 May 1992 (age 34)	Right-handed	Right-arm seam	
**Yolandi Potgieter**	South Africa	16 May 1989 (age 37)	Right-handed	Right-arm seam	
Bowlers
Kiara Fisher	South Africa	3 January 2002 (age 24)	Right-handed	Right-arm orthodox spin	
Khayakazi Mathe	South Africa	2 May 1999 (age 27)	Right-handed	Right-arm seam	
Lucian Swartz	South Africa	23 August 2004 (age 21)	Right-handed	Right-arm seam	High-performance Contract
Jané Winster	South Africa	15 July 1994 (age 32)	Right-handed	Right-arm orthodox spin	

=== Notable players ===
Players who have played for South Western Districts and played internationally are listed below, in order of first international appearance (given in brackets):

- (England) Rebecca Grundy (2014)
- (South Africa) (New Zealand) Bernadine Bezuidenhout (2014) (Note: Bezuidenhout represented both South Africa and New Zealand in international cricket.)
- (South Africa) Tazmin Brits (2018)
- (South Africa) Annerie Dercksen (2023)
- (South Africa) Mieke de Ridder (2023)

== See also ==
- South Western Districts (cricket team)
