= Northerns women's cricket team =

South African women's cricket team

Northerns Women
Personnel
- Captain: Robyn Searle
- Coach: Bryon Fraser

Team information
- Founded: Unknown First recorded match: 1960
- Home ground: Centurion Park, Centurion

History
- ODC wins: 3
- T20 wins: 0
- Official website: Titans Cricket

The Northerns women's cricket team, also known as Fidelity Titans and previously known as Northern Transvaal women's cricket team, is the women's representative cricket team for the South African region of Tshwane. They compete in the CSA Women's One-Day Cup, which they have won three times, and the CSA Women's T20 Challenge.

== History ==
The side first appeared in the Simon Trophy, as Northern Transvaal, in the 1951–52 season and played in the tournament until 1959–60. As Northerns, they next competed in the Inter-Provincial Tournament in 1995–96, and have competed in the tournament ever since. They first won the tournament in 1998–99, beating North West in the final. They next won the tournament in 2010–11, finishing second in their group to qualify for the knockout stages before beating Boland in the semi-final and KwaZulu-Natal in the final. They retained their title the following season, going unbeaten in the group stages before beating KwaZulu-Natal in the semi-final. They then beat Western Province in the final by 161 runs, with Marizanne Kapp making 106.

They have also competed in the CSA Women's Provincial T20 Competition since its inception in 2012–13. They have finished as runners-up in the competition twice, in 2013–14 and 2015–16.

In August 2023, it was announced that a new professional domestic system would be implemented for women's cricket in South Africa. As one of the six teams in the top division of the two domestic competitions, Northerns would be allowed eleven professional players from the 2023–24 season onwards.

== Current squad ==
Squad for 2026/27 Season. Players in bold have played international cricket.

Name	Nationality	Birth date	Batting style	Bowling style	Notes
Batters
**Anneke Bosch**	South Africa	17 August 1993 (age 33)	Right-handed	Right-arm seam	National Contract
Julia Hoal	South Africa	1 January 2001 (age 25)	Right-handed		
Simone Lourens	South Africa	2 July 2007 (age 19)	Right-handed		
Amogelang Maphangula	South Africa	8 November 2003 (age 22)	Right-handed		
Katherine Prior	South Africa	17 December 2001 (age 24)	Right-handed	Right-arm seam	
**Laura Wolvaardt**	South Africa	26 April 1999 (age 27)	Right-handed		National Contract
Keepers
Tebogo Macheke	South Africa	19 June 2000 (age 26)	Right-handed		
Imaan van Schalkwyk	South Africa		Left-handed		High-performance
All-Rounders
**Suné Luus**	South Africa	5 January 1996 (age 30)	Right-handed	Right-arm wrist spin	National Contract
**Eliz-Mari Marx**	South Africa	20 January 2003 (age 23)	Right-handed	Right-arm seam	
**Luyanda Nzuza**	South Africa	23 March 2006 (age 20)	Right-handed	Right-arm orthodox spin	
**Miané Smit**	South Africa	2 February 2005 (age 21)	Right-handed	Right-arm orthodox spin	
Bowlers
Masingita Khoza	South Africa	25 July 1999 (age 27)	Left-handed	Left-arm seam	High-performance
**Masabata Klaas**	South Africa	3 February 1991 (age 35)	Right-handed	Right-arm seam	National Contract
Monalisa Legodi	South Africa	2 November 2005 (age 20)	Right-handed	Right-arm seam	
Lesedi Madisha	South Africa		Right-handed	Right-arm seam	High-performance
Paulinah Mashishi	South Africa	13 February 1999 (age 27)	Right-handed	Right-arm orthodox spin	
Angel Mgwenya	South Africa	14 February 2000 (age 26)	Right-handed	Right-arm seam	
**Caitlin Wyngaard**	South Africa		Right-handed	Right-arm seam	

=== Notable players ===
Players who have played for Northerns and played internationally are listed below, in order of first international appearance (given in brackets):

- (South Africa) Patricia Klesser (1960)
- (South Africa) Anina Burger (1997)
- (South Africa) Cindy Eksteen (1997)
- (South Africa) Linda Olivier (1997)
- (South Africa) Karin Swart (1997)
- (South Africa) Yulandi van der Merwe (2000)
- (South Africa) Sunette Viljoen (2000)
- (South Africa) Rozelle Scheepers (2000)
- (South Africa) Hanri Strydom (2000)
- (South Africa) Cri-Zelda Brits (2002)
- (South Africa) Tamara Reeves (2002)
- (South Africa) Charlize van der Westhuizen (2003)
- (South Africa) Lonell de Beer (2005)
- (South Africa) Marcia Letsoalo (2007)
- (South Africa) Mignon du Preez (2007)
- (South Africa) Kirsten Blair (2007)
- (South Africa) Dane van Niekerk (2009)
- (South Africa) Marizanne Kapp (2009)
- (South Africa) Masabata Klaas (2010)
- (South Africa) Melissa Smook (2011)
- (South Africa) Suné Luus (2012)
- (South Africa) Andrie Steyn (2014)
- (South Africa) Odine Kirsten (2016)
- (South Africa) Anneke Bosch (2016)
- (South Africa) Nadine de Klerk (2017)
- (South Africa) Robyn Searle (2018)
- (South Africa) Delmi Tucker (2022)
- (South Africa) Eliz-Mari Marx (2023)
- (United Arab Emirates) Michelle Botha (2025)

== Honours ==
- CSA Women's Provincial Programme:
  - Winners (3): 1998–99, 2010–11 & 2011–12
- CSA Women's Provincial T20 Competition:
  - Winners (0):
  - Best finish: Runners-up (2013–14 & 2015–16)

== See also ==
- Northerns (cricket team)
- Titans (cricket team)
