= Northern Cape women's cricket team =

South African women's cricket team

Northern Cape Women
Personnel
- Captain: Susan Benade
- Coach: Mark Arthur

Team information
- Founded: Unknown First recorded match: 1952
- Home ground: De Beers Diamond Oval, Kimberley

History
- ODC wins: 0
- T20 wins: 0

The Northern Cape women's cricket team, previously known as Griqualand West women's cricket team, is the women's representative cricket team for the South African province of Northern Cape. They compete in the CSA Women's One-Day Cup and the CSA Women's T20 Challenge.

== History ==
The side first competed in the South African domestic system in 1951–52, playing in the Simon Trophy as Griqualand West. They competed in that tournament for two seasons, before not playing until they joined the Caltrate Inter-Provincial Tournament in 1997–98. They have competed in the tournament ever since, but have never made it to the knockout stages. In 2015, the side was renamed Northern Cape, bringing the name into line with the name of the province. In the 2022–23, they finished top of Division 2 Pool B of the 50-over tournament, qualifying for a promotion play-off. However, they lost to Free State by 188 runs in the play-off.

They have also competed in the CSA Women's Provincial T20 Competition since its inception in 2012–13, but have again never qualified for the knockout stages.

== Players ==
=== Notable players ===
Players who have played for Northern Cape and played internationally are listed below, in order of first international appearance (given in brackets):

- (South Africa) Susan Benade (2005)
- (South Africa) Annelie Minny (2007)
- (South Africa) (New Zealand) Bernadine Bezuidenhout (2014) (Note: Bezuidenhout represented both South Africa and New Zealand in international cricket.)

== See also ==
- Northern Cape (cricket team)
