= Central Gauteng women's cricket team =

South African women's cricket team

Central Gauteng Women
Personnel
- Captain: Kgomotso Rapoo
- Coach: Shaun Pretorius

Team information
- Founded: Unknown First recorded match: 1998
- Home ground: Wanderers Stadium, Johannesburg

History
- ODC wins: 1
- T20 wins: 1
- Official website: Lions Cricket

The Central Gauteng women's cricket team, also known as DP World Lions and previously known as Southern Transvaal women's cricket team, Transvaal women's cricket team and Gauteng women's cricket team, is the women's representative cricket team for part of the South African province of Gauteng. They compete in the CSA Women's One-Day Cup and the CSA Women's T20 Challenge.

== History ==
The side first competed in the Simon Trophy in 1951–52, as Southern Transvaal, competing in the tournament until 1986–87. They then joined the Inter-Provincial Tournament for its inaugural season in 1995–96, as Transvaal, before becoming known as Gauteng in 1997–98. The side became Central Gauteng in 2019–20, and has also been known as Lions, in conjunction with the men's team. They have competed in Provincial One-Day Tournament ever since their first appearance, winning the title once, in 2004–05. That season, they finished second in Group B to qualify for the knockout rounds, subsequently reaching the final where they beat Border by 64 runs. They have also finished as runners-up in the tournament four times: in 2012–13, and three times in a row between 2015–15 and 2017–18.

Central Gauteng have also competed in the CSA Women's Provincial T20 Competition since it began in 2012–13. They have finished as runners-up three times, in 2012–13, 2016–17 and 2021–22, every time to Western Province. They won their first T20 competition in 2022–23, topping the Top 6 Division with eight wins from ten matches.

In August 2023, it was announced that a new professional domestic system would be implemented for women's cricket in South Africa. As one of the six teams in the top division of the two domestic competitions, Central Gauteng would be allowed eleven professional players from the 2023–24 season onwards.

== Players ==
=== Current squad ===
Based on squad announced for the 2026–27 season. Players in bold have international caps.

Name	Nationality	Birth date	Batting style	Bowling style	Notes
Batters
**Tazmin Brits**	South Africa	8 January 1991 (age 35)	Right-handed		National Contract
Keamogetswe Chuene	South Africa				
Jenna Evans	South Africa	21 January 2004 (age 22)	Right-handed		
Diara Ramlakan	South Africa	27 March 2007 (age 19)	Right-handed	Right-arm seam	
**Nonkululeko Thabethe**	South Africa	1 September 1992 (age 34)	Right-handed	Right-arm seam	
**Sunette Viljoen**	South Africa	6 August 1983 (age 43)	Right-handed	Right-arm seam	
Keepers
**Sinalo Jafta**	South Africa	22 December 1994 (age 31)	Right-handed		National Contract
Razeena Manack	South Africa				
**Karabo Meso**	South Africa	18 September 2007 (age 19)	Right-handed		National Contract
Neo Molefe	South Africa				
All-rounders
Lethabo Bidli	South Africa		Right-handed	Right-arm orthodox spin	
Fay Cowling	South Africa	30 January 2007 (age 19)	Right-handed	Right-arm seam	
**Madison Landsman**	Netherlands South Africa	30 January 2004 (age 22)	Right-handed	Right-arm wrist spin	
**Chloe Tryon**	South Africa	25 January 1994 (age 32)	Right-handed	Left-arm orthodox spin	National Contract
Bowlers
**Shabnim Ismail**	South Africa	5 October 1988 (age 38)	Left-handed	Right-arm seam	
Liyema Jubati	South Africa	24 November 2004 (age 21)	Right-handed	Right-arm orthodox spin	
**Ayabonga Khaka**	South Africa	18 July 1992 (age 34)	Right-handed	Right-arm seam	National Contract
Lehlohonolo Meso	South Africa	12 June 2000 (age 26)	Right-handed	Right-arm seam	
Relebohile Mkhize	South Africa	26 September 2009 (age 17)		Left-arm seam	
Refilwe Moncho	South Africa	1 January 2004 (age 22)	Right-handed	Right-arm seam	
Sarah Nettleton	South Africa	3 April 2003 (age 23)	Right-handed	Left-arm orthodox spin	
**Raisibe Ntozakhe**	South Africa	29 November 1996 (age 29)	Right-handed	Right-arm orthodox spin	
Kgomotso Rapoo	South Africa	16 May 2002 (age 24)	Right-handed	Right-arm wrist spin	
**Tumi Sekhukhune**	South Africa	21 November 1998 (age 27)	Left-handed	Right-arm seam	
Leani Swanepoel	South Africa			Right-arm seam	
Thuto Thibedi	South Africa			Right-arm wrist spin	

=== Notable players ===
Players who have played for Central Gauteng and played internationally are listed below, in order of first international appearance (given in brackets):

- (South Africa) Barbara Cairncross (1960)
- (South Africa) Pamela Hollett (1960)
- (South Africa) Eileen Hurly (1960)
- (South Africa) Jean McNaughton (1960)
- (South Africa) Yvonne van Mentz (1960)
- (South Africa) Lorna Ward (1960)
- (South Africa) Dulcie Wood (1960)
- (New Zealand) Bev Brentnall (1966)
- (New Zealand) Jos Burley (1966)
- (England) Lesley Clifford (1966)
- (South Africa) Beverly Botha (1972)
- (South Africa) Carole Gildenhuys (1972)
- (South Africa) Wea Skog (1972)
- (South Africa) Gloria Williamson (1972)
- (South Africa) Myrna Katz (1972)
- (South Africa) Brenda Williams (1972)
- (South Africa) Alta Kotze (1997)
- (South Africa) Kerri Laing (1997)
- (South Africa) Linda Olivier (1997)
- (South Africa) Daleen Terblanche (1997)
- (South Africa) Sunette Viljoen (2000)
- (South Africa) Cri-Zelda Brits (2002)
- (South Africa) Tamara Reeves (2002)
- (South Africa) Trisha Chetty (2007)
- (South Africa) Shabnim Ismail (2007)
- (South Africa) Kirsten Blair (2007)
- (South Africa) Kirstie Thomson (2009)
- (South Africa) Melissa Smook (2011)
- (South Africa) Ayabonga Khaka (2012)
- (South Africa) Savanna Cordes (2013)
- (South Africa) Yolani Fourie (2014)
- (South Africa) Nonkhululeko Thabethe (2014)
- (South Africa) Raisibe Ntozakhe (2017)
- (South Africa) Tumi Sekhukhune (2018)
- (South Africa) Robyn Searle (2018)
- (Zimbabwe) Sharne Mayers (2019)
- (South Africa) Karabo Meso (2024)
- (Netherlands) Madison Landsman (2024)

== Honours ==
- CSA Women's One-Day Cup:
  - Winners (1): 2004–05
- CSA Women's T20 Challenge:
  - Winners (1): 2022–23

== See also ==
- Gauteng (cricket team)
