= Border women's cricket team =

South African women's cricket team

Border Women
Personnel
- Captain: Genevieve Fritz

Team information
- Founded: Unknown First recorded match: 1952
- Home ground: Buffalo Park, East London

History
- ODC wins: 0
- T20 wins: 0
- Official website: Border Cricket

The Border women's cricket team is the women's representative cricket team for the South African region of Border. They compete in the CSA Women's One-Day Cup and the CSA Women's T20 Challenge.

== History ==
Border Women first appeared in the Simon Trophy in the 1951–52 season, playing in the tournament until the 1975–76 season. They next appeared in the Women's Inter-Provincial Trophy in 1997–98, and have played in the tournament ever since. Their best finish came in the 2004–05 season, when they reached the final, but lost to Gauteng by 64 runs.

In more recent years, they gained promotion to the top tier of the tournament in the 2016–17 season after going unbeaten in the initial group stage before finishing 5th in the knockout rounds. They were relegated in the 2018–19 season, before immediately regaining promotion the following season, then being relegated again in 2020–21.

They have also competed in the CSA Women's Provincial T20 Competition since its inception in 2012–13. They achieved their best finish in that season, topping Group B to qualify for the knockout stages, where they lost in the semi-final but won the third-place play-off.

== Players ==
=== Notable players ===
Players who have played for Border and played internationally are listed below, in order of first international appearance (given in brackets):

- (South Africa) Nolu Ndzundzu (2000)
- (South Africa) Shafeeqa Pillay (2004)
- (South Africa) Angelique Taai (2005)
- (South Africa) Moseline Daniels (2010)
- (South Africa) Akhona Nyiki (2011)
- (South Africa) Ayabonga Khaka (2012)
- (South Africa) Sinalo Jafta (2016)
- (South Africa) Anneke Bosch (2016)
- (South Africa) Zintle Mali (2018)

== Honours ==
- CSA Women's One-Day Cup:
  - Winners (0):
  - Best finish: Runners-up (2004–05)
- CSA Women's T20 Challenge:
  - Winners (0):
  - Best finish: 3rd (2012–13)

== See also ==
- Border (cricket team)
