= KwaZulu-Natal Coastal women's cricket team =

South African women's cricket team

KwaZulu-Natal Coastal Women
Personnel
- Captain: Nondumiso Shangase (50-over); Courtney Gounden (T20)
- Coach: Angelique Taai

Team information
- Founded: Unknown First recorded match: 1998
- Home ground: Kingsmead Cricket Ground, Durban

History
- ODC wins: 1
- T20 wins: 0
- Official website: Dolphins Cricket

The KwaZulu-Natal Coastal women's cricket team, also known as Hollywoodbets Dolphins and previously known as Natal women's cricket team and KwaZulu-Natal women's cricket team, is the women's representative cricket team for part of the South African province of KwaZulu-Natal, based primarily in Durban. They compete in the CSA Women's One-Day Cup and the CSA Women's T20 Challenge. They won the one-day competition in the 2009–10 season.

== History ==
As Natal Women, the side first competed in the Simon Trophy in 1952–53, and played in the tournament until 1971–72. They joined the Inter-Provincial Tournament for its inaugural season in 1995–96, and became known as KwaZulu-Natal in 1997–98. The side became KwaZulu-Natal Coastal in 2019–20, differentiating them from fellow KwaZulu-Natal side KwaZulu-Natal Inland. They have competed in the Provincial One-Day Tournament ever since their first appearance, winning the title once, in 2009–10. That season, they topped the Central Group, winning all eight of their matches, before beating Central Gauteng in the semi-final and then beating Western Province in the final, by four wickets. They have also finished as runners-up in the tournament four times, in 2007–08, 2010–11, 2013–14 and 2022–23. In the 2020–21 season, due to COVID-19 protocols, there was no overall winner, but the side did win one of the two top tier groups, winning three of their four matches.

The side has also competed in the CSA Women's Provincial T20 Competition since its inception in 2012–13. They have finished third in the competition twice, in 2013–14 and 2014–15.

In August 2023, it was announced that a new professional domestic system would be implemented for women's cricket in South Africa. As one of the six teams in the top division of the two domestic competitions, KwaZulu-Natal Coastal would be allowed eleven professional players from the 2023–24 season onwards.

== Players ==
=== Current squad ===
Squad for 2026/27 Season. Players in bold have played international cricket.

Name	Nationality	Birth date	Batting style	Bowling style	Notes
Batters
Nicole de Klerk	South Africa	19 January 1999 (age 27)	Right-handed	Right-arm seam	
Asamkele Kawu	South Africa	26 February 2006 (age 20)	Right-handed		
Asakhe Nyovane	South Africa	11 October 2004 (age 21)	Right-handed	Right-arm seam	
**Robyn Searle**	South Africa	17 June 1997 (age 29)	Right-handed	Right-arm seam	
Keeper
**Yasmeen Khan**	NamibiaSouth Africa	7 January 1999 (age 27)	Right-handed	Right-arm seam	
All-rounders
Micaela Andrews	South Africa	9 August 1998 (age 28)	Right-handed	Right-arm seam	
Alexandra Candler	South Africa	20 August 2003 (age 23)	Right-handed	Right-arm seam	
Elandri janse van Rensburg	South Africa	10 January 2005 (age 21)	Right-handed	Right-arm seam	
**Zintle Mali**	South Africa	21 January 1994 (age 32)	Right-handed	Right-arm seam	
**Nondumiso Shangase**	South Africa	5 April 1996 (age 30)	Right-handed	Right-arm orthodox spin	
Bowlers
Nobulumko Baneti	South Africa	5 January 1999 (age 27)	Right-handed	Right-arm seam	
**Jade de Figueiredo**	PortugalSouth Africa	10 March 1999 (age 27)	Right-handed	Left-arm orthodox spin	
**Ayanda Hlubi**	South Africa	16 July 2004 (age 22)	Right-handed	Right-arm seam	National contract
**Nonkululeko Mlaba**	South Africa	27 January 1999 (age 27)	Right-handed	Left-arm orthodox spin	National contract
**Seshnie Naidu**	South Africa	5 January 2006 (age 20)	Right-handed	Right-arm wrist spin	
Nosihle Ngubane	South Africa	16 July 2005 (age 21)	Right-handed	Right-arm orthodox spin	

=== Notable players ===
Players who have played for KwaZulu-Natal Coastal and played internationally are listed below, in order of first international appearance (given in brackets):

- (South Africa) Jennifer Gove (1960)
- (South Africa) Joy Irwin (1960)
- (South Africa) Eleanor Lambert (1960)
- (South Africa) Yvonne van Mentz (1960)
- (South Africa) Lorna Ward (1960)
- (South Africa) Moira Jones (1972)
- (South Africa) Dawn Moe (1972)
- (South Africa) Rista Stoop (1997)
- (South Africa) Johmari Logtenberg (2003)
- (South Africa) Shandre Fritz (2003)
- (South Africa) Trisha Chetty (2007)
- (South Africa) Olivia Anderson (2008)
- (South Africa) Dinesha Devnarain (2008)
- (South Africa) Chloe Tryon (2010)
- (South Africa) Nadine Moodley (2013)
- (South Africa) Zintle Mali (2018)
- (South Africa) Nondumiso Shangase (2019)
- (South Africa) Nonkululeko Mlaba (2019)
- (South Africa) Ayanda Hlubi (2023)
- (South Africa) Seshnie Naidu (2024)
- (Portugal) Jade de Figueiredo (2025)

== Honours ==
- CSA Women's One-Day Cup:
  - Winners (1): 2009–10
- CSA Women's T20 Challenge:
  - Winners (0):
  - Best finish: 3rd (2013–14 & 2014–15)

== See also ==
- KwaZulu-Natal (cricket team)
- KwaZulu-Natal Inland women's cricket team
