= Limpopo women's cricket team =

South African women's cricket team

Limpopo Women
Personnel
- Captain: Tebogo Macheke
- Coach: Neo Sekokotla

Team information
- Founded: Unknown First recorded match: 2004
- Home ground: Polokwane Cricket Club Ground, Polokwane

History
- ODC wins: 0
- T20 wins: 0

The Limpopo women's cricket team, also known as the Limpopo Impalas, is the women's representative cricket team for the South African province of Limpopo. They compete in the CSA Women's One-Day Cup and the CSA Women's T20 Challenge.

== History ==
Limpopo Women joined the South African domestic system in the 2004–05 season, competing in the Women's Provincial League. In their first season, they finished third in their group of four, winning one of their six matches. They have competed in the tournament ever since, but have never made it out of the initial group stage. The side has also competed in the CSA Women's Provincial T20 Competition since its inception in 2012–13, but have again never made it out of the initial group stages.

== Players ==
=== Notable players ===
Players who have played for Limpopo and played internationally are listed below, in order of first international appearance (given in brackets):

- (South Africa) Alta Kotze (1997)
- (South Africa) Sunette Viljoen (2000)
- (South Africa) Hanri Strydom (2000)

== See also ==
- Limpopo (cricket team)
