= Kei women's cricket team =

South African women's cricket team

Kei Women
Personnel
- Captain: Asaphele Jani

Team information
- Founded: Unknown First recorded match: 2010
- Home ground: Khaya Majola Oval, Mthatha

History
- ODC wins: 0
- T20 wins: 0

The Kei women's cricket team is the women's representative cricket team based in the South African city of Mthatha. They compete in the CSA Women's One-Day Cup and the CSA Women's T20 Challenge.

== History ==
Kei Women joined the South African domestic system in the 2010–11 season, playing in the Women's Provincial League, in which they lost all ten of their matches in the West/East Group. Kei have competed in every season of the one-day competition since, but have only ever won one match: in 2017, they beat KwaZulu-Natal Inland by two wickets, helped by Kei bowler Namhla Njani taking 7/24.

They have also competed in the CSA Women's Provincial T20 Competition since its inception in 2012–13, but have never won a match in the competition.

== Players ==
=== Notable players ===
Players who have played for Kei and played internationally are listed below, in order of first international appearance (given in brackets):

- (Zimbabwe) Nomvelo Sibanda (2019)

== See also ==
- Kei (cricket team)
