= Eastern Province women's cricket team =

South African women's cricket team

Eastern Province Women
Personnel
- Coach: Siyabulela Nkosana

Team information
- Founded: Unknown First recorded match: 1954
- Home ground: St George's Park Cricket Ground, Gqeberha

History
- ODC wins: 0
- T20 wins: 0

The Eastern Province women's cricket team is the women's representative cricket team for parts of the South African region of Eastern Cape. They compete in the CSA Women's One-Day Cup and the CSA Women's T20 Challenge.

== History ==
Eastern Province Women first appeared in the Simon Trophy in the 1953–54 season, playing in the tournament until the 1963–64 season. They next appeared in the Women's Inter-Provincial Trophy in 1996–97, and have played in the tournament ever since. Their best finish came in the 2003–04 season, when they reached the final, but lost to Boland by 64 runs. They currently compete in the second tier of the competition.

They have also competed in the CSA Women's Provincial T20 Competition since its inception in 2012–13. They achieved their best finish in 2013–14, topping Group B to qualify for the knockout stages. However, they lost both the semi-final and the third-place play-off to finish fourth overall.

== Current squad ==
Squad for 2026/27. Players in bold have played international cricket.

Name	Nationality	Birth date	Batting style	Bowling style	Notes
Batters
Lunambitho Gana	South Africa	26 February 2006 (age 20)	Right-handed		
Siyamthanda Koloi	South Africa		Right-handed		
Mpumelelo Mashiloane	South Africa	2 March 2007 (age 19)	Right-handed	Right-arm seam	
Zizipho Mdebuka	South Africa	15 April 1992 (age 34)	Right-handed		
Keepers
Kwanga Pinini	South Africa	5 October 2003 (age 22)	Left-handed		
Palesa Mapoo	South Africa	17 April 2000 (age 26)	Right-handed		
All-Rounders
Sarah Barber	South Africa	2 October 2003 (age 22)	Right-handed	Right-arm seam	
Alyssa Erxleben	South Africa	26 June 1998 (age 28)	Right-handed	Right-arm orthodox spin	
Rasika Maharaj	South Africa	25 June 1993 (age 33)	Left-handed	Right-arm orthodox spin	
**Jana Nell**	South Africa	28 February 1990 (age 36)	Right-handed	Right-arm orthodox spin	
**Gabriella Sequeira**	PortugalSouth Africa	12 December 2008 (age 17)	Right-handed	Right-arm wrist spin	
Christelle van der Schyff	South Africa	29 June 2005 (age 21)	Right-handed	Right-arm seam	
Cayleigh Wanckel	South Africa	12 January 2009 (age 17)	Right-handed	Right-arm orthodox spin	
Bowlers
Aphilile Adonisi	South Africa		Right-handed	Right-arm orthodox spin	
Asaphila Jani	South Africa		Right-handed	Right-arm seam	
**Nthabiseng Nini**	South Africa	9 September 2005 (age 21)	Right-handed	Right-arm seam	

=== Notable players ===
Players who have played for Eastern Province and played internationally are listed below, in order of first international appearance (given in brackets):

- (South Africa) Audrey Jackson (1960)
- (South Africa) Juanita van Zyl (1972)
- (South Africa) Evne Webber (1999)
- (South Africa) Claire Terblanche (2003)
- (South Africa) Shafeeqa Pillay (2004)
- (South Africa) Dane van Niekerk (2009)
- (South Africa) Marizanne Kapp (2009)
- (South Africa) Jana Nell (2010)
- (South Africa) (New Zealand) Bernadine Bezuidenhout (2014) (Note: Bezuidenhout represented both South Africa and New Zealand in international cricket.)
- (South Africa) Mieke de Ridder (2023)

== Honours ==
- CSA Women's One-Day Cup:
  - Winners (0):
  - Best finish: Runners-up (2003–04)
- CSA Women's T20 Challenge:
  - Winners (0):
  - Best finish: 4th (2013–14)

== See also ==
- Eastern Province (cricket team)
