= Boland women's cricket team =

South African women's cricket team

Boland Women
Personnel
- Captain: Chantelle van Schoor
- Coach: Michaela Hanekom

Team information
- Founded: Unknown First recorded match: 1998
- Home ground: Boland Park, Paarl

History
- ODC wins: 2
- T20 wins: 1
- Official website: Boland Cricket

The Boland women's cricket team is the women's representative cricket team for the South African region of Boland. They compete in the CSA Women's One-Day Cup and the CSA Women's T20 Challenge. They have won two one-day titles and one T20 title.

== History ==
Boland Women first appeared in the 1997–98 season of the Caltrate Inter-Provincial Tournament, although the full results for the tournament are unrecorded. They have competed in every season of the tournament since. Boland have won the tournament twice, in 2003–04 and 2007–08. In 2003–04, they beat Eastern Province in the final by 107 runs, whilst in 2007–08 they won the title by going unbeaten to top the Super Six section of the tournament. The side also finished as runners-up in the tournament three times in four seasons, in 2005–05, 2006–07 and 2008–09.

Boland have also competed in the CSA Women's Provincial T20 Competition since its inception in the 2012–13 season. They won the second edition of the tournament, in 2013–14, beating Northerns in the final after bowling them out for just 32 in the first innings.

== Players ==
=== Notable players ===
Players who have played for Boland and played internationally are listed below, in order of first international appearance (given in brackets):

- (South Africa) Denise Reid (1997)
- (Netherlands) Helmien Rambaldo (1998)
- (South Africa) Sune van Zyl (1999)
- (South Africa) Alison Hodgkinson (2000)
- (South Africa) Josephine Barnard (2002)
- (South Africa) Madelein Lotter (2002)
- (South Africa) Leighshe Jacobs (2003)
- (South Africa) Alicia Smith (2003)
- (South Africa) Claire Terblanche (2003)
- (South Africa) Ashlyn Kilowan (2003)
- (South Africa) Sunette Loubser (2007)
- (South Africa) Yolandi van der Westhuizen (2009)
- (South Africa) Moseline Daniels (2010)
- (South Africa) Yolandi Potgieter (2013)
- (South Africa) (New Zealand) Bernadine Bezuidenhout (2014) (Note: Bezuidenhout represented both South Africa and New Zealand in international cricket.)
- (South Africa) Stacy Lackay (2018)
- (Singapore) Diviya G K (2018)
- (South Africa) Faye Tunnicliffe (2018)
- (Italy) Alexia Kontopirakis (2025)

== Honours ==
- CSA Women's One-Day Cup:
  - Winners (2): 2003–04 & 2007–08
- CSA Women's T20 Challenge:
  - Winners (1): 2013–14

== See also ==
- Boland (cricket team)
