= KwaZulu-Natal Inland women's cricket team =

South African women's cricket team

KwaZulu-Natal Inland Women
Personnel
- Captain: Phumla Mthalane
- Coach: Richard Hlela

Team information
- Founded: Unknown First recorded match: 2006
- Home ground: City Oval, Pietermaritzburg

History
- ODC wins: 0
- T20 wins: 0
- Official website: KZN Inland

The KwaZulu-Natal Inland women's cricket team, also known as the Hollywoodbets Tuskers, is the women's representative cricket team for part of the South African province of KwaZulu-Natal, based primarily in Pietermaritzburg. They compete in the CSA Women's One-Day Cup and the CSA Women's T20 Challenge.

== History ==
KwaZulu-Natal Inland Women joined the South African domestic structure in the 2006–07 season, playing in the Women's Provincial League, finished 5th in their group with four wins from their twelve matches. They joined a team named KwaZulu-Natal in the league, who were later renamed KwaZulu-Natal Coastal. They have never reached the knockout stages of the one-day provincial competition.

They have also competed in the CSA Women's Provincial T20 Competition since its inception in 2012–13. They have also never reached the knockout stages of this competition.

== Players ==
=== Notable players ===
Players who have played for KwaZulu-Natal Inland and played internationally are listed below, in order of first international appearance (given in brackets):

- (South Africa) Trisha Chetty (2007)
- (Zimbabwe) Mary-Anne Musonda (2019)

== See also ==
- KwaZulu-Natal Inland (cricket team)
- KwaZulu-Natal Coastal women's cricket team
