= List of South Africa national cricket captains =

South Africa played its first Test match in cricket in 1889 against England at Port Elizabeth, becoming the third Test nation after England and Australia. This is a list of the men and women who have been the official South African captains in cricket.

South Africa was a founder member of the International Cricket Council in 1909. However, the South African team did not play official Test cricket from 1970 to 1991, having been suspended from membership by the ICC as a result of controversy over apartheid (most particularly the reaction to the Basil d'Oliveira affair). There were a number of rebel tours to South Africa in the intervening period, but none of the matches are recognised as official Test matches and are italicised below. South Africa rejoined the ICC, and resumed playing official Test cricket, in 1991.

== Men's cricket ==
=== Test match captains ===
This is a list of cricketers who have captained the South African cricket team for at least one Test match. Where a player has a dagger (†) next to a Test match series in which he captained at least one Test, that denotes that player deputised for the appointed captain or were appointed by the home authority for a minor proportion in a series. The dagger classification follows that adopted by Wisden Cricketers' Almanack.

South African Test match captains
Number	Image	Name	Season	Report	Opposition	Location	Played	Won	Lost	Drawn
1		Owen Dunell	1888–89	Report	England	South Africa	1	0	1	0
2		William Milton	1888–89	Report	England	South Africa	1	0	1	0
2		William Milton	1891–92	Report	England	South Africa	1	0	1	0
2		William Milton	Total				2	0	2	0
3		Ernest Halliwell	1895–96	Report	England	South Africa	2	0	2	0
3		Ernest Halliwell	1902–03	Report	Australia	South Africa	1	0	1	0
3		Ernest Halliwell	Total				3	0	3	0
4		Alfred Richards	1895–96†	Report	England	South Africa	1	0	1	0
5		Murray Bisset	1898–99	Report	England	South Africa	2	0	2	0
6		Henry Taberer	1902–03	Report	Australia	South Africa	1	0	0	1
7		Biddy Anderson	1902–03	Report	Australia	South Africa	1	0	1	0
8		Percy Sherwell	1905–06	Report	England	South Africa	5	4	1	0
8		Percy Sherwell	1907	Report	England	England	3	0	1	2
8		Percy Sherwell	1910–11	Report	Australia	Australia	5	1	4	0
8		Percy Sherwell	Total				13	5	6	2
9		Tip Snooke	1909–10	Report	England	South Africa	5	3	2	0
10		Frank Mitchell	1912	Report	Australia	England	2	0	2	0
10		Frank Mitchell	1912	Report	England	England	1	0	1	0
10		Frank Mitchell	Total				3	0	3	0
11		Louis Tancred	1912	Report	England	England	2	0	2	0
11		Louis Tancred	1912	Report	Australia	England	1	0	0	1
11		Louis Tancred	Total				3	0	2	1
12		Herbie Taylor	1913–14	Report	England	South Africa	5	0	4	1
12		Herbie Taylor	1921–22	Report	Australia	South Africa	3	0	1	2
12		Herbie Taylor	1922–23	Report	England	South Africa	5	1	2	2
12		Herbie Taylor	1924	Report	England	England	5	0	3	2
12		Herbie Taylor	Total				18	1	10	7
13		Nummy Deane	1927–28	Report	England	South Africa	5	2	2	1
13		Nummy Deane	1929	Report	England	England	5	0	2	3
13		Nummy Deane	1930–31	Report	England	South Africa	2	0	0	2
13		Nummy Deane	Total				12	2	4	6
14		Buster Nupen	1930–31†	Report	England	South Africa	1	1	0	0
15		Jock Cameron	1930–31	Report	England	South Africa	2	0	0	2
15		Jock Cameron	1931–32	Report	Australia	Australia	5	0	5	0
15		Jock Cameron	1931–32	Report	New Zealand	New Zealand	2	2	0	0
15		Jock Cameron	Total				9	2	5	2
16		Herbie Wade	1935	Report	England	England	5	1	0	4
16		Herbie Wade	1935–36	Report	Australia	South Africa	5	0	4	1
16		Herbie Wade	Total				10	1	4	5
17		Alan Melville	1938–39	Report	England	South Africa	5	0	1	4
17		Alan Melville	1947	Report	England	England	5	0	3	2
17		Alan Melville	Total				10	0	4	6
18		Dudley Nourse	1948–49	Report	England	South Africa	5	0	2	3
18		Dudley Nourse	1949–50	Report	Australia	South Africa	5	0	4	1
18		Dudley Nourse	1951	Report	England	England	5	1	3	1
18		Dudley Nourse	Total				15	1	9	5
19		Jack Cheetham	1952–53	Report	Australia	Australia	5	2	2	1
19		Jack Cheetham	1952–53	Report	New Zealand	New Zealand	2	1	0	1
19		Jack Cheetham	1953–54	Report	New Zealand	South Africa	5	4	0	1
19		Jack Cheetham	1955	Report	England	England	3	0	3	0
19		Jack Cheetham	Total				15	7	5	3
20		Jackie McGlew	1955†	Report	England	England	2	2	0	0
20		Jackie McGlew	1956–57†	Report	England	South Africa	1	0	1	0
20		Jackie McGlew	1957–58†	Report	Australia	South Africa	1	0	0	1
20		Jackie McGlew	1960	Report	England	England	5	0	3	2
20		Jackie McGlew	1961–62	Report	New Zealand	South Africa	5	2	2	1
20		Jackie McGlew	Total				14	4	6	4
21		Clive van Ryneveld	1956–57	Report	England	South Africa	4	2	1	1
21		Clive van Ryneveld	1957–58	Report	Australia	South Africa	4	0	3	1
21		Clive van Ryneveld	Total				8	2	4	2
22		Trevor Goddard	1963–64	Report	Australia	Australia	5	1	1	3
22		Trevor Goddard	1963–64	Report	New Zealand	New Zealand	3	0	0	3
22		Trevor Goddard	1964–65	Report	England	South Africa	5	0	1	4
22		Trevor Goddard	Total				13	1	2	10
23		Peter van der Merwe	1965	Report	England	England	3	1	0	2
23		Peter van der Merwe	1966–67	Report	Australia	South Africa	5	3	1	1
23		Peter van der Merwe	Total				8	4	1	3
24		Ali Bacher	1969–70	Report	Australia	South Africa	4	4	0	0
-		Mike Procter	1981–82	Report	England	South Africa	3	1	0	2
-		Peter Kirsten	1982–83	Report	Sri Lanka	South Africa	2	2	0	0
-		Peter Kirsten	1982–83	Report	West Indies	South Africa	2	1	1	0
-		Peter Kirsten	1983–84	Report	West Indies	South Africa	2	1	0	1
-		Peter Kirsten	Total				6	4	1	1
-		Clive Rice	1983–84†	Report	West Indies	South Africa	2	0	2	0
-		Clive Rice	1985–86	Report	Australia	South Africa	3	1	0	2
-		Clive Rice	1986–87	Report	Australia	South Africa	4	1	0	3
-		Clive Rice	Total				9	2	2	5
-		Jimmy Cook	1989–90	Report	England	South Africa	1	1	0	0
25		Kepler Wessels	1991–92	Report	West Indies	West Indies	1	0	1	0
25		Kepler Wessels	1992–93	Report	India	South Africa	4	1	0	3
25		Kepler Wessels	1993–94	Report	Sri Lanka	Sri Lanka	3	1	0	2
25		Kepler Wessels	1993–94	Report	Australia	Australia	2	1	0	1
25		Kepler Wessels	1993–94	Report	Australia	South Africa	3	1	1	1
25		Kepler Wessels	1994	Report	England	England	3	1	1	1
25		Kepler Wessels	Total				16	5	3	8
26		Hansie Cronje	1993–94†	Report	Australia	Australia	1	0	1	0
26		Hansie Cronje	1994–95	Report	New Zealand	South Africa	3	2	1	0
26		Hansie Cronje	1994–95	Report	Pakistan	South Africa	1	1	0	0
26		Hansie Cronje	1994–95	Report	New Zealand	New Zealand	1	1	0	0
26		Hansie Cronje	1995–96	Report	Zimbabwe	Zimbabwe	1	1	0	0
26		Hansie Cronje	1995–96	Report	England	South Africa	5	1	0	4
26		Hansie Cronje	1996–97	Report	India	India	3	1	2	0
26		Hansie Cronje	1996–97	Report	India	South Africa	3	2	0	1
26		Hansie Cronje	1996–97	Report	Australia	South Africa	3	1	2	0
26		Hansie Cronje	1997–98	Report	Pakistan	Pakistan	3	1	0	2
26		Hansie Cronje	1997–98	Report	Australia	Australia	3	0	1	2
26		Hansie Cronje	1997–98	Report	Pakistan	South Africa	2	1	1	0
26		Hansie Cronje	1997–98	Report	Sri Lanka	South Africa	2	2	0	0
26		Hansie Cronje	1998	Report	England	England	5	1	2	2
26		Hansie Cronje	1998–99	Report	West Indies	South Africa	5	5	0	0
26		Hansie Cronje	1998–99	Report	New Zealand	New Zealand	3	1	0	2
26		Hansie Cronje	1999–2000	Report	Zimbabwe	South Africa	1	1	0	0
26		Hansie Cronje	1999–2000	Report	Zimbabwe	Zimbabwe	1	1	0	0
26		Hansie Cronje	1999–2000	Report	England	South Africa	5	2	1	2
26		Hansie Cronje	1999–2000	Report	India	India	2	2	0	0
26		Hansie Cronje	Total				53	27	11	15
27		Gary Kirsten	1997–98†	Report	Pakistan	South Africa	1	0	0	1
28		Shaun Pollock	2000–01	Report	Sri Lanka	Sri Lanka	3	1	1	1
28		Shaun Pollock	2000–01	Report	New Zealand	South Africa	3	2	0	1
28		Shaun Pollock	2000–01	Report	Sri Lanka	South Africa	3	2	0	1
28		Shaun Pollock	2000–01	Report	West Indies	West Indies	5	2	1	2
28		Shaun Pollock	2001–02	Report	Zimbabwe	Zimbabwe	2	1	0	1
28		Shaun Pollock	2001–02	Report	India	South Africa	2	1	0	1
28		Shaun Pollock	2001–02	Report	Australia	Australia	3	0	3	0
28		Shaun Pollock	2002–03	Report	Bangladesh	South Africa	1	1	0	0
28		Shaun Pollock	2002–03	Report	Sri Lanka	South Africa	2	2	0	0
28		Shaun Pollock	2002–03	Report	Pakistan	South Africa	2	2	0	0
28		Shaun Pollock	Total				26	14	5	7
29		Mark Boucher	2001–02	Report	Australia	South Africa	3	1	2	0
29		Mark Boucher	2002–03†	Report	Bangladesh	South Africa	1	1	0	0
29		Mark Boucher	Total				4	2	2	0
30		Graeme Smith	2003	Report	Bangladesh	Bangladesh	2	2	0	0
30		Graeme Smith	2003	Report	England	England	5	2	2	1
30		Graeme Smith	2003–04	Report	Pakistan	Pakistan	2	0	1	1
30		Graeme Smith	2003–04	Report	West Indies	South Africa	4	3	0	1
30		Graeme Smith	2003–04	Report	New Zealand	New Zealand	3	1	1	1
30		Graeme Smith	2004	Report	Sri Lanka	Sri Lanka	2	0	1	1
30		Graeme Smith	2004–05	Report	India	India	2	0	1	1
30		Graeme Smith	2004–05	Report	England	South Africa	5	1	2	2
30		Graeme Smith	2004–05	Report	Zimbabwe	South Africa	2	2	0	0
30		Graeme Smith	2005	Report	West Indies	West Indies	4	2	0	2
30		Graeme Smith	2005–06	Report	Australia	Australia	3	0	2	1
30		Graeme Smith	2005–06	Report	Australia	South Africa	2	0	2	0
30		Graeme Smith	2005–06	Report	New Zealand	South Africa	3	2	0	1
30		Graeme Smith	2006–07	Report	India	South Africa	3	2	1	0
30		Graeme Smith	2006–07	Report	Pakistan	South Africa	3	2	1	0
30		Graeme Smith	2007–08	Report	Pakistan	Pakistan	2	1	0	1
30		Graeme Smith	2007–08	Report	New Zealand	South Africa	2	2	0	0
30		Graeme Smith	2007–08	Report	West Indies	South Africa	3	2	1	0
30		Graeme Smith	2007–08	Report	Bangladesh	Bangladesh	2	2	0	0
30		Graeme Smith	2007–08	Report	India	India	3	1	1	1
30		Graeme Smith	2008	Report	England	England	4	2	1	1
30		Graeme Smith	2008–09	Report	Bangladesh	South Africa	2	2	0	0
30		Graeme Smith	2008–09	Report	Australia	Australia	3	2	1	0
30		Graeme Smith	2008–09	Report	Australia	South Africa	2	0	2	0
30		Graeme Smith	2009–10	Report	England	South Africa	4	1	1	2
30		Graeme Smith	2009–10	Report	India	India	2	1	1	0
30		Graeme Smith	2010	Report	West Indies	West Indies	3	2	0	1
30		Graeme Smith	2010–11	Report	Pakistan	United Arab Emirates	2	0	0	2
30		Graeme Smith	2010–11	Report	India	South Africa	3	1	1	1
30		Graeme Smith	2011–12	Report	Australia	South Africa	2	1	1	0
30		Graeme Smith	2011–12	Report	Sri Lanka	South Africa	3	2	1	0
30		Graeme Smith	2011–12	Report	New Zealand	New Zealand	3	1	0	2
30		Graeme Smith	2012	Report	England	England	3	2	0	1
30		Graeme Smith	2012–13	Report	Australia	Australia	3	1	0	2
30		Graeme Smith	2012–13	Report	New Zealand	South Africa	2	2	0	0
30		Graeme Smith	2012–13	Report	Pakistan	South Africa	3	3	0	0
30		Graeme Smith	2013–14	Report	Pakistan	United Arab Emirates	2	1	1	0
30		Graeme Smith	2013–14	Report	India	South Africa	2	1	0	1
30		Graeme Smith	2013–14	Report	Australia	South Africa	3	1	2	0
30		Graeme Smith	Total				108	53	28	27
31		Jacques Kallis	2005–06†	Report	Australia	South Africa	1	0	1	0
31		Jacques Kallis	2008–09†	Report	Australia	South Africa	1	1	0	0
31		Jacques Kallis	Total				2	1	1	0
32		Ashwell Prince	2006	Report	Sri Lanka	Sri Lanka	2	0	2	0
33		Hashim Amla	2014	Report	Sri Lanka	Sri Lanka	2	1	0	1
33		Hashim Amla	2014	Report	Zimbabwe	Zimbabwe	1	1	0	0
33		Hashim Amla	2014–15	Report	West Indies	South Africa	3	2	0	1
33		Hashim Amla	2015	Report	Bangladesh	Bangladesh	2	0	0	2
33		Hashim Amla	2015–16	Report	India	India	4	0	3	1
33		Hashim Amla	2015–16	Report	England	South Africa	2	0	1	1
33		Hashim Amla	Total				14	4	4	6
34		AB de Villiers	2015–16	Report	England	South Africa	2	1	1	0
34		AB de Villiers	2017–18†	Report	Zimbabwe	South Africa	1	1	0	0
34		AB de Villiers	Total				3	2	1	0
35		Faf du Plessis	2016†	Report	New Zealand	South Africa	2	1	0	1
35		Faf du Plessis	2016–17†	Report	Australia	Australia	3	2	1	0
35		Faf du Plessis	2016–17	Report	Sri Lanka	South Africa	3	3	0	0
35		Faf du Plessis	2016–17	Report	New Zealand	New Zealand	3	1	0	2
35		Faf du Plessis	2017	Report	England	England	3	1	2	0
35		Faf du Plessis	2017–18	Report	Bangladesh	South Africa	2	2	0	0
35		Faf du Plessis	2017–18	Report	India	South Africa	3	2	1	0
35		Faf du Plessis	2017–18	Report	Australia	South Africa	4	3	1	0
35		Faf du Plessis	2018	Report	Sri Lanka	Sri Lanka	2	0	2	0
35		Faf du Plessis	2018–19	Report	Pakistan	South Africa	2	2	0	0
35		Faf du Plessis	2018–19	Report	Sri Lanka	South Africa	2	0	2	0
35		Faf du Plessis	2019–20	Report	India	India	3	0	3	0
35		Faf du Plessis	2019–20	Report	England	South Africa	4	1	3	0
35		Faf du Plessis	Total				36	18	15	3
36		Dean Elgar	2017†	Report	England	England	1	0	1	0
36		Dean Elgar	2018–19†	Report	Pakistan	South Africa	1	1	0	0
36		Dean Elgar	2021	Report	West Indies	West Indies	2	2	0	0
36		Dean Elgar	2021–22	Report	India	South Africa	3	2	1	0
36		Dean Elgar	2021–22	Report	New Zealand	New Zealand	2	1	1	0
36		Dean Elgar	2021–22	Report	Bangladesh	South Africa	2	2	0	0
36		Dean Elgar	2022	Report	England	England	3	1	2	0
36		Dean Elgar	2022–23	Report	Australia	Australia	3	0	2	1
36		Dean Elgar	2023–24†	Report	India	South Africa	1	0	1	0
36		Dean Elgar	Total				19	9	8	1
37		Quinton de Kock	2020–21	Report	Sri Lanka	South Africa	2	2	0	0
37		Quinton de Kock	2020–21	Report	Pakistan	Pakistan	2	0	2	0
37		Quinton de Kock	Total				4	2	2	0
38		Temba Bavuma	2023	Report	West Indies	South Africa	2	2	0	0
38		Temba Bavuma	2023–24	Report	India	South Africa	1	1	0	0
38		Temba Bavuma	2024	Report	West Indies	West Indies	2	1	0	1
38		Temba Bavuma	2024	Report	Sri Lanka	South Africa	2	2	0	0
38		Temba Bavuma	2024-25	Report	Pakistan	South Africa	2	2	0	0
38		Temba Bavuma	2025 (WTC Final)	Report	Australia	England	1	1	0	0
38		Temba Bavuma	2025–26	Report	India	India	2	2	0	0
38		Temba Bavuma	2026-27	Report	Australia	South Africa	1	0	1	0
38		Temba Bavuma	Total				13	11	1	1
39		Neil Brand	2023–24	Report	New Zealand	New Zealand	2	0	2	0
40		Aiden Markram	2024–25	Report	Bangladesh	Bangladesh	2	2	0	0
40		Aiden Markram	2025–26	Report	Pakistan	Pakistan	2	1	1	0
40		Aiden Markram	Total				4	3	1	0
41		Keshav Maharaj	2025	Report	Zimbabwe	Zimbabwe	1	1	0	0
42		Wiann Mulder	2025	Report	Zimbabwe	Zimbabwe	1	1	0	0
Grand total							479	191	162	126

Last Updated: 16 October 2026

=== One Day International captains ===
This is a complete list of cricketers who have captained South Africa in at least one One Day International. Updated on 16 October 2026.

South African ODI captains
Number	Name	Period of captaincy	Played	Won	Lost	Tied	No result	% won
1	Clive Rice	1991	3	1	2	0	0	33.33
2	Kepler Wessels	1992–1994	52	20	30	0	2	40.00
3	Hansie Cronje	1994–2000	138	99	35	1	3	73.70
4	Shaun Pollock	2000–2005	92	59	29	3	1	66.48
5	Graeme Smith	2003–2011	149	92	51	1	5	64.23
6	Mark Boucher	2003	1	1	0	0	0	100.00
7	Nicky Boje	2005	1	1	0	0	0	100.00
8	Jacques Kallis	2006–2010	13	6	6	0	1	50.00
9	Johan Botha	2008–2010	10	8	2	0	0	80.00
10	Hashim Amla	2011–2015	9	4	5	0	0	44.44
11	AB de Villiers	2012–2017	103	59	39	1	4	60.10
12	Faf du Plessis	2013–2019	39	28	10	0	1	73.68
13	Aiden Markram	2018–2026	18	8	10	0	0	44.44
14	Quinton de Kock	2018–2020	8	4	3	0	1	57.14
15	JP Duminy	2018	2	2	0	0	0	100.00
16	Temba Bavuma	2021–present	51	28	22	0	1	54.90
17	Keshav Maharaj	2021–2022	7	2	3	0	2	40.00
18	David Miller	2022	1	0	1	0	0	0.00
19	Rassie van der Dussen	2024	1	0	1	0	0	0.00
20	Matthew Breetzke	2025	3	1	2	0	0	33.33
21	Bjorn Fortuin	2026	2	2	0	0	0	100.00
22	Prenelan Subrayen	2026	1	1	0	0	0	100.00
Grand total			704	426	251	6	21	60.51

=== Twenty20 International captains ===
This is a list of cricketers who have captained South Africa for at least one Twenty20 International. Updated on 16 October 2026.

South Africa Twenty20 International captains
Number	Name	Period of captaincy	Played	Won	Lost	Tied	No result	% won
1	Graeme Smith	2005–2010	27	18	9	0	0	66.66
2	Shaun Pollock	2007	1	0	1	0	0	0.00
3	Johan Botha	2008–2012	11	8	3	0	0	72.72
4	Hashim Amla	2011	2	1	1	0	0	50.00
5	AB de Villiers	2012–2017	18	8	9	0	1	47.05
6	Faf du Plessis	2012–2019	37	23	13	1	0	63.51
7	JP Duminy	2014–2019	11	6	5	0	0	54.54
8	Justin Ontong	2015	1	1	0	0	0	100.00
9	Farhaan Behardien	2017	3	1	2	0	0	33.33
10	David Miller	2019-2022	6	4	2	0	0	66.66
11	Quinton de Kock	2019-2020	11	3	8	0	0	27.27
12	Heinrich Klaasen	2021-2024	9	4	5	0	0	44.44
13	Temba Bavuma	2021–2022	25	15	9	0	0	62.50
14	Keshav Maharaj	2021-2026	10	7	2	0	1	77.77
15	Aiden Markram	2023–present	46	23	22	1	0	51.08
16	Rassie van der Dussen	2024-2025	8	2	6	0	0	25.00
17	Donovan Ferreira	2025	4	1	3	0	0	25.00
18	Bjorn Fortuin	2026	5	4	1	0	0	80.00
Grand total			235	131	101	0	3	55.74

== Women's cricket ==
=== Women's Test match captains ===
This is a list of cricketers who have captained the South African women's cricket team for at least one women's Test match. Updated 16 October 2026.

South African women's Test captains
Number	Name	Season	Opposition	Location	Played	Won	Lost	Drawn	% won
1	Sheelagh Nefdt	1960–1961	England	South Africa	4	0	1	3	0.00
2	Maureen Payne	1972	New Zealand	South Africa	3	0	1	2	0.00
3	Cindy Eksteen	2002	India	South Africa	1	0	1	0	0.00
4	Alison Hodgkinson	2003	England	England	2	0	1	1	0.00
5	Cri-Zelda Brits	2007	Netherlands	Netherlands	1	1	0	0	100.00
6	Mignon du Preez	2014	India	India	1	0	1	0	0.00
7	Suné Luus	2022	England	England	1	0	0	1	-
8	Laura Wolvaardt	2024	India	India	3	0	3	0	0.00
Grand total					16	1	8	7	6.25

=== Women's One-Day International captains ===
This is a list of cricketers who have captained the South African women's cricket team for at least one women's one-day international. Updated 16 October 2026

South African women's ODI captains
Number	Name	Year	Played	Won	Lost	Tied	No result	% won
1	Kim Price	1997–2000	26	13	12	0	1	52.00
2	Linda Olivier	1999	3	0	3	0	0	0.00
3	Cindy Eksteen	1999–2002	6	2	3	0	1	40.00
4	Alison Hodgkinson	2003–2005	19	4	14	0	1	22.22
5	Cri-zelda Brits	2007–2011	23	16	6	0	1	72.72
6	Sunette Loubser	2009	7	3	3	1	0	50.00
7	Alicia Smith	2009	1	0	1	0	0	0.00
8	Mignon du Preez	2011–2016	46	24	19	0	3	55.81
9	Dinesha Devnarain	2016	5	3	2	0	0	66.6
10	Dane van Niekerk	2016–2021	50	29	18	2	1	61.22
11	Lizelle Lee	2016	1	0	1	0	0	0.00
12	Sune Luus	2017–2022	34	19	11	2	2	62.50
13	Chloe Tryon	2017–2025	5	3	2	0	0	55.88
14	Laura Wolvaardt	2021-present	50	28	21	0	1	56.00
Grand total			276	144	116	6	11	52.17

=== Women's Twenty20 Internationals ===
This is a list of cricketers who have captained the South African women's cricket team for at least one Women's Twenty20 International. Updated 16 October 2026.

South African women's T20I captains
Number	Name	Year	Played	Won	Lost	Tied	No result	% won
1	Cri-zelda Brits	2007–2010	12	3	9	0	0	25.00
2	Sunette Loubser	2009	5	0	5	0	0	0.00
3	Alicia Smith	2009	1	0	1	0	0	0.00
4	Mignon du Preez	2011–2016	50	24	25	0	1	48.97
5	Dane van Niekerk	2014–2021	30	15	13	0	2	50.00
6	Dinesha Devnarain	2016	2	1	1	0	0	50.00
7	Chloe Tryon	2018–2022	6	3	3	0	0	50.00
8	Sune Luus	2019–2023	34	17	16	0	1	50.00
9	Laura Wolvaardt	2023-present	56	30	23	0	3	53.57
10	Tazmin Brits	2023	1	0	1	0	0	0.00
11	Nadine de Klerk	2024	1	0	1	0	0	0.00
Grand total			199	93	99	0	7	46.73

== Youth cricket ==
=== Test match captains ===
This is a list of cricketers who have captained the South African U-19 cricket team for at least one under-19 Test match. Updated 16 October 2026.

South African Under-19 Test match captains
Number	Name	Year	Opposition	Location	Played	Won	Lost	Drawn
1	Neil McKenzie	1995	England	England	3	0	2	1
2	Douglas Gain	1996	India	India	3	1	1	1
3	Philip Hearle	1997	Pakistan	South Africa	3	0	2	1
4	Matthew Street	1997	England	South Africa	2	0	0	2
5	Thami Tsolekile	1999	Pakistan	Pakistan	3	0	1	2
6	Rivash Gobind	2001	New Zealand	New Zealand	3	0	2	1
7	Imraan Khan	2003	England	England	3	2	0	1
8	Wayne Parnell	2007/08	Bangladesh	South Africa	1	0	0	1
8	Wayne Parnell	2008	India	South Africa	1	0	0	1
8	Wayne Parnell	Total			2	0	0	2
9	Jonathan Vandiar	2008	India	South Africa	1	0	1	0
10	Diego Rosier	2013	England	South Africa	2	1	1	0
11	Sibonelo Makhanya	2014	England	England	2	0	0	2
12	Wiaan Mulder	2016	Sri Lanka	Sri Lanka	3	0	0	3
13	Wandile Makwetu	2018	England	England	2	0	2	0
14	Matt Montgomery	2019	India	India	2	0	2	0
15	Bennie Hansen	2025	England	South Africa	2	0	1	1
16	Jason Rowles	2026	England	England	2	1	0	1
Grand total					34	5	5	18

=== Youth One-day International captains ===
This is a list of cricketers who have captained the South African Under-19 cricket team for at least one Under-19 One Day International. Updated 16 October 2026.

South African Under-19 ODI captains
Number	Name	Year	Played	Won	Lost	No result
1	Neil McKenzie	1995	2	0	2	0
2	Douglas Gain	1996	3	0	3	0
3	Wade Wingfield	1997	1	1	0	0
4	Philip Hearle	1997	2	1	1	0
5	Matthew Street	1998	8	7	1	0
6	Thami Tsolekile	1999–2000	9	5	3	1
7	Johan Botha	2001	2	0	1	1
8	Rivash Gobind	2001	1	1	0	0
9	Hashim Amla	2002	8	5	3	0
10	Imraan Khan	2003	2	1	0	1
11	Divan van Wyk	2004	6	3	3	0
12	Dean Elgar	2005–2006	10	3	7	0
13	Jonathan Vandiar	2008–2009	6	3	3	0
14	Wayne Parnell	2008	8	4	4	0
15	Josh Richards	2009–2010	9	6	3	0
16	Keaton Jennings	2010–2011	16	13	2	1
17	Shaylen Pillay	2011	1	1	0	0
18	Quinton de Kock	2012	9	5	4	0
19	Prenelan Subrayen	2012	1	1	0	0
20	Chad Bowes	2012	6	5	1	0
21	Diego Rosier	2013	4	4	0	0
22	Yaseen Valli	2013	5	3	2	0
23	Aiden Markram	2013–2014	8	8	0	0
24	Sibonelo Makhanya	2014–2015	9	0	9	0
25	Marques Ackerman	2014	1	0	1	0
26	Tony de Zorzi	2015–2016	13	6	7	0
27	Kyle Verreynne	2015	1	0	1	0
28	Willem Ludick	2015	1	0	1	0
29	Wiaan Mulder	2016-2017	9	6	3	0
30	Mitchell Van Buuren	2017	2	2	2	0
31	Raynard van Tonder	2017-2018	14	7	7	0
32	Wandile Makwetu	2018	2	2	0	0
33	Matt Montgomery	2019	2	2	0	0
34	Bryce Parsons	2019-2020	17	4	13	0
35	Khanya Cotani	2019	3	0	3	0
36	George Van Heerden	2021-2022	10	5	5	0
37	David Teeger	2023-2024	7	2	5	0
38	Juan James	2023-2024	8	5	3	0
39	Bennie Hansen	2025	3	2	1	0
40	Muhammed Bulbulia	2025-2026	13	3	10	0
41	Jason Rowles	2025-2026	8	4	4	0
Grand total			252	130	118	4

== See also ==
- List of South African Test cricketers
- List of South African ODI cricketers
