= South Africa women's cricket team in England in 2000 =

South African women's cricket team in England in 2000
	England	South Africa
- Dates: 14 June 2000 – 1 July 2000
Captains	Clare Connor	Kim Price

One Day International series
- Results: England won the 5-match series 3–2
Most runs	Barbara Daniels 231	Helen Davies 148
Most wickets	Kathryn Leng 7	Helen Davies 5 Yulandi van der Merwe 5

The South Africa national women's cricket team toured England in 2000, playing five women's One Day Internationals.

== One Day International series ==
=== 1st ODI ===
20 June 2000
Scorecard

England; 159 (43.4 overs)	v	South Africa; 139/9 (44 overs)
Barbara Daniels 49 (89); Kerri Laing 2/12 (9 overs)		Linda Olivier 52 (120); Kathryn Leng 2/34 (7 overs)

England won by 20 runs
County Ground, Chelmsford
Umpires: Mark Benson and Lorraine Elgar
Player of the match: Melissa Reynard (Eng)

- England won the toss and elected to bat.

=== 2nd ODI ===
22 June 2000
Scorecard

South Africa; 151/9 (35 overs)	v	England; 91/1 (18 overs)
Helen Davies 43 (51); Lucy Pearson 3/14 (7 overs)		Claire Taylor 47* (50); Helen Davies 1/18 (2 overs)

England won by 9 wickets
Trent Bridge, Nottingham
Umpires: Ann Roberts and David Shepherd
Player of the match: Lucy Pearson (Eng)

- England won the toss and elected to field.

=== 3rd ODI ===
25 June 2000
Scorecard

England; 203/6 (50 overs)	v	South Africa; 204/9 (49.4 overs)
Barbara Daniels 74 (106); Denise Reid 2/36 (9 overs)		Helen Davies 47 (53); Kathryn Leng 4/47 (10 overs)

South Africa won by 1 wicket
St Lawrence Ground, Canterbury
Umpires: Pasty Harris and Kathy Taylor
Player of the match: Helen Davies (SA)

- England won the toss and elected to bat.

=== 4th ODI ===
28 June 2000
Scorecard

South Africa; 222/7 (50 overs)	v	England; 225/2 (46.2 overs)
Cindy Eksteen 62 (88); Dawn Holden 2/44 (10 overs)		Charlotte Edwards 96* (123); Yulandi van der Merwe 2/38 (7.2 overs)

England won by 8 wickets
County Ground, Taunton
Umpires: Neil Mallender and Judith West
Player of the match: Barbara Daniels (Eng)

- England won the toss and elected to field.

=== 5th ODI ===
1 July 2000
Scorecard

South Africa; 156/6 (39 overs)	v	England; 123/8 (32 overs)
Kerri Laing 67 (112); Melissa Reynard 2/24 (6 overs)		Charlotte Edwards 57 (89); Helen Davies 3/34 (10 overs)

South Africa won by 5 runs
New Road, Worcester
Umpires: John Hayes and Mervyn Kitchen
Player of the match: Kerri Laing (SA)

- England won the toss and elected to field.

== Tour matches ==
=== 50-over match: South Africa women v England A women ===
14 June 2000
Scorecard

England A Women; 164/8 (50 overs)	v	South Africa; 165/7 (48.4 overs)
Mandie Godliman 34 (86); Nolu Ndzundzu 1/18 (6 overs)		Helen Davies 47 (54); Katharine Winks 2/23 (10 overs)

South Africa won by 3 wickets
Denis Compton Oval, Shenley
Umpires: Della Rebours and Janet Rogers

=== 50-over match: South Africa women v England A women ===
16 June 2000
Scorecard

England A Women; 169/8 (50 overs)	v	South Africa; 169/8 (50 overs)
Kath Wilkins 47 (50); Yulandi van der Merwe 2/16 (10 overs)		Helen Davies 28 (42); Kath Wilkins 2/36 (10 overs)

Match tied
Denis Compton Oval, Shenley
Umpires: Valerie Gibbens and Annette Owen
