= India women's cricket team in South Africa in 2001–02 =

Indian women's cricket team in South Africa in 2001–02
| | South Africa | India |
- Dates: 7 March 2002 – 22 March 2002
| Captains | Cindy Eksteen | Anjum Chopra |

Test series
- Result: India won the 1-match series 1–0
| Most runs | Sunnette Viljoen (88) | Anjum Chopra (82) |
| Most wickets | Cri-Zelda Brits (2); Cindy Eksteen (2) | Neetu David (4); Jhulan Goswami (4) |

One Day International series
- Results: South Africa won the 4-match series 2–1
| Most runs | Kerri Laing (133) | Mithali Raj (103) |
| Most wickets | Cri-Zelda Brits (5); Sune van Zyl (5) | Deepa Marathe (5) |

The India women's national cricket team toured South Africa in 2001–02, playing one Test match and four women's One Day Internationals. South Africa won the ODI series by 2–1 and India won the only Test match played between the sides.

== One Day International series ==
=== 1st ODI ===
7 March 2002
Scorecard

| South Africa; 176/3 (46 overs) | v | India; 9/0 (4 overs) |
| Kerri Laing 91* (145); Anjum Chopra 2/32 (10 overs) | | Anju Jain 5* (16) |

No result
Lenasia Stadium, Johannesburg
Umpires: Lourens Engelbrecht and J Hampton

- India Women won the toss and elected to field.
- Rain delayed the start of the match and reduced to 46 overs per side.
- Match was abandoned after 4 overs of the second innings due to rain.
- Bindeshwari Goyal (Ind); Josephine Barnard and Cri-zelda Brits (SA) made their ODI debut.

=== 2nd ODI ===
10 March 2002
Scorecard

| India; 158/9 (50 overs) | v | South Africa; 123/4 (32.5 overs) |
| Mithali Raj 61 (101); Sune van Zyl 4/23 (10 overs) | | Daleen Terblanche 26 (41); Sunita Singh 1/21 (8 overs) |

South Africa won by 29 runs (D/L)
North West Cricket Stadium, Potchefstroom
Umpires: Roderick Ellis and Johannes Horn

- India Women won the toss and elected to bat.
- Rain reduced South Africa innings to 48 overs.
- Rain stopped play at 32.5 overs of the South Africa innings, the D/L par score for South Africa at 33 overs was 94 runs.

=== 3rd ODI ===
13 March 2002
Scorecard

| India; 111/3 (30 overs) | v | South Africa; 137/7 (29.5 overs) |
| Anjum Chopra 41* (82); Sune van Zyl 1/14 (6 overs) | | Cindy Eksteen 36 (40); Neetu David 2/17 (6 overs) |

South Africa won by 3 wickets (D/L)
Centurion Park, Centurion
Umpires: B Goldwin and L van Zyl

- South Africa Women won the toss and elected to field.
- Rain delayed the start of the match and caused multiple play interruptions:
  At 12.5 overs of the first innings (India 41/2), match was reduced to 42 overs per side.
  At 20 overs of the first innings (India 66/2), match was reduced to 32 overs per side.
  At 23.3 overs of the first innings (India 87/2), match was reduced to 30 overs per side.
- South Africa was given a 137 runs target from 30 overs.

=== 4th ODI ===
16 March 2002
Scorecard

| India; 160/6 (50 overs) | v | South Africa; 123 (46.5 overs) |
| Anjum Chopra 36 (87); Cri-Zelda Brits 2/30 (10 overs) | | Josephine Barnard 32 (89); Deepa Marathe 4/28 (10 overs) |

India won by 37 runs
Green Point Stadium, Cape Town
Umpires: L Forbes and Russell Mackintosh

- South Africa Women won the toss and elected to field.
- Madelein Lotter and Tamara Reeves (SA) made their ODI debut.

== Test series ==
=== Only Test ===
19–22 March 2002
Scorecard

| India | v | South Africa |
| 404/9d (168 overs); Anjum Chopra 80 (254); Cindy Eksteen 2/64 (38 overs) | | 150 (83.3 overs); Josephine Barnard 31 (179); Deepa Marathe 3/14 (12.3 overs) |
| 13/0 (1.3 overs); Mithali Raj 9* (4); Cri-Zelda Brits 0/0 (0.3 overs) | | 266 (f/o) (142.2 overs); Alison Hodgkinson 77 (227); Hemlata Kala 3/18 (8.2 overs) |

India won by 10 wickets
Boland Bank Park, Paarl
Umpires: Mark Jamieson and Jacobus van Tonder

- India Women won the toss and elected to bat.
- Jaya Sharma and Sunita Singh (Ind); Josephine Barnard, Cri-zelda Brits, Cindy Eksteen, Alison Hodgkinson, Kerri Laing, Madelein Lotter, Denise Reid, Daleen Terblanche, Yulandi van der Merwe, Sune van Zyl and Sunette Viljoen (SA) made their Test debut.
