= South Africa women's cricket team in New Zealand in 1998–99 =

South African women's cricket team in New Zealand in 1998–99
	New Zealand	South Africa
- Dates: 10 February 1999 – 17 February 1999
Captains	Debbie Hockley	Linda Olivier

One Day International series
- Results: New Zealand won the 3-match series 3–0
Most runs	Rebecca Rolls 84	Denise Reid 44
Most wickets	Rachel Pullar 9	Denise Reid 2 Cindy Eksteen 2

The South Africa women's cricket team toured New Zealand in 1998–99, playing three women's One Day Internationals. New Zealand whitewashed the series 3–0.

== One Day International series ==
=== 1st ODI ===
13 February 1999
Scorecard

South Africa; 82 (42.5 overs)	v	New Zealand; 83/2 (23.5 overs)
Daleen Terblanche 16 (46); Donna Trow 3/8 (6 overs)		Anna Smith 42 (71); Cindy Eksteen 2/19 (10 overs)

New Zealand won by 8 wickets
Carisbrook, Dunedin
Umpires: Ross Murdoch and Graeme Stewart

- South Africa won the toss and elected to bat
- Anna Smith, Donna Trow and Kate Pulford (NZ) made their WODI debut.

=== 2nd ODI ===
15 February 1999
Scorecard

New Zealand; 226/9 (50 overs)	v	South Africa; 101 (46.1 overs)
Rebecca Rolls 84* (68); Denise Reid 2/42 (10 overs)		Denise Reid 40 (71); Clare Nicholson 2/9 (9 overs)

New Zealand won by 125 runs
Jade Stadium, Christchurch
Umpires: Gary Baxter and Peter Williams

- New Zealand won the toss and elected to bat

=== 3rd ODI ===
17 February 1999
Scorecard

South Africa; 96 (49.2 overs)	v	New Zealand; 99/1 (14.3 overs)
Linda Olivier 17 (58); Rachel Pullar 5/7 (7 overs)		Debbie Hockley 52* (46)

New Zealand won by 9 wickets
Seddon Park, Hamilton
Umpires: Barry Frost and Tony Hill

- South Africa won the toss and elected to bat
- Haidee Tiffen (NZ) and Erne Webber (SA) made their WODI debut.

== Tour matches ==
=== 50-over matches: South Africa women v New Zealand A women ===
10 February 1999
Scorecard

New Zealand A 96 (49.2 overs)	v	South Africa; 99/1 (14.3 overs)
Helen Watson 46 (87); Helen Davies 2/22 (4.4 overs)		Denise Reid 26 (44); Helen Watson 3/21 (10 overs)

New Zealand A won by 72 runs
Lincoln Green, Canterbury
Umpires: Jeremy Busby and Graeme Stewart

- New Zealand A won the toss and elected to bat
- South Africa bowled 55 extras, including 46 wides

11 February 1999
Scorecard

New Zealand A 285/6 (50 overs)	v	South Africa; 211 (49.5 overs)
Aroha Northover 92 (66); Sune van Zyl 1/36 (9 overs)		Kerri Laing 50 (50); Catherine Moffat 3/45 (6 overs)

New Zealand A won by 74 runs
Lincoln Green, Canterbury
Umpires: Jeremy Busby and Graeme Stewart

- New Zealand A won the toss and elected to bat
