= England women's cricket team in South Africa in 2003–04 =

English women's cricket team in South Africa in 2003–04
	South Africa	England
- Dates: 8 February 2004 – 1 March 2004
Captains	Alison Hodgkinson	Clare Connor

One Day International series
- Results: England won the 5-match series 4–1
Most runs	Johmari Logtenberg 158	Charlotte Edwards 380
Most wickets	Cri-Zelda Brits 6 Shandre Fritz 6	Rosalie Birch 11

The England women's cricket team toured South Africa in 2003–04, playing five women's One Day Internationals.

== One Day International series ==
=== 1st ODI ===
15 February 2004
Scorecard

England; 151/9 (50 overs)	v	South Africa; 152/9 (50 overs)
Charlotte Edwards 55 (97); Shandre Fritz 3/22 [9]		Johmari Logtenberg 67 (99); Clare Connor 4/25 [10]

South Africa won by 1 wicket
ABSA Oval, Port Elizabeth
Umpires: Hugo Lindenberg and Lawrence Willemse
Player of the match: Johmari Logtenberg

- England won the toss and elected to bat.

=== 2nd ODI ===
18 February 2004
Scorecard

England; 281/7 (50 overs)	v	South Africa; 162 (42.5 overs)
Charlotte Edwards 102 (117); Sune van Zyl 2/53 [9]		Daleen Terblanche 27 (44); Clare Taylor 3/48 [9]

England won by 119 runs
Mercedes Benz Park, East London
Umpires: Kevin Adams and Mike Gajjar
Player of the match: Charlotte Edwards

- England won the toss and elected to bat.

=== 3rd ODI ===
22 February 2004
Scorecard

South Africa; 157/5 (50 overs)	v	England; 159/3 (40.5 overs)
Daleen Terblanche 81 (152); Rosalie Birch 2/26 [10]		Charlotte Edwards 84* (126); Shandre Fritz 2/18 [5.5]

England won by 7 wickets
Laudium Oval, Pretoria
Umpires: Zama Ndamane and Gerrie Pienaar
Player of the match: Charlotte Edwards

- South Africa won the toss and elected to bat.

=== 4th ODI ===
29 February 2004
Scorecard

England; 242/5 (50 overs)	v	South Africa; 142/9 (50 overs)
Claire Taylor 82 (76); Cri-Zelda Brits 3/43 [10]		Alicia Smith 38 (56); Rosalie Birch 3/28 [10]

England won by 100 runs
Lenasia Stadium, Johannesburg
Umpires: John Ostrom and Gerrie Pienaar
Player of the match: Claire Taylor

- England won the toss and elected to bat.

=== 5th ODI ===
1 March 2004
Scorecard

England; 254/9 (50 overs)	v	South Africa; 216 (48.5 overs)
Charlotte Edwards 81 (93); Josephine Barnard 2/33 [7]		Johmari Logtenberg 76 (73); Rosalie Birch 5/50 [9.5]

England won by 38 runs
North West Cricket Stadium, Potchefstroom
Umpires: Karl Hurter and Zama Ndamane
Player of the match: Rosalie Birch

- England won the toss and elected to bat.

== Tour matches ==
=== 50-over tour match: England Women v Northerns Women ===
8 February 2004
Scorecard

England; 238/7 (50 overs)	v	Northerns; 123 (43.3 overs)
Laura Newton 84 (133); Yolandie Bronkhorst 3/41 [8.3]		Yulandi van der Merwe 44 (48); Rosalie Birch 2/11 [6.3]

England won by 115 runs
Harlequins, Pretoria
Umpires: Duma Ntuli and S Zoutendyk

- England won the toss and elected to bat.

=== 50-over tour match: England Women v Boland and Western Province Women's Invitation XI ===
12 February 2004
Scorecard

England; 207/6 (50 overs)	v	Boland and Western Province Women's Invitation XI; 53 (46.5 overs)
Charlotte Edwards 44 (71); A Pietersen 3/43 [10]		B Cartlege 19 (82); Lucy Pearson 4/10 [10]

England won by 154 runs
ABSA Oval, Port Elizabeth
Umpires: Shaun George and Bernard Harrison

- England won the toss and elected to bat.

=== 50-over tour match: England Women v Boland and Eastern Province Women's Invitation XI ===
14 February 2004
Scorecard

England; 225 (42.2 overs)	v	Boland and Eastern Province Women's Invitation XI; 101/9 (50 overs)
Claire Taylor 90 (98); A Veeriah 3/19 [4.2]		Trisha Chetty 26* (73); Beth Morgan 3/24 [10]

England won by 124 runs
ABSA Oval, Port Elizabeth
Umpires: C Barry and Shaun George

- England won the toss and elected to bat.

=== 50-over tour match: England Women v Northerns Women ===
20 February 2004
Scorecard

England; 212 (49.4 overs)	v	Northerns; 161/8 (50 overs)
Laura Newton 60 (89); Kirsten Blair 4/32 [10]		M Langa 44 (96); Helen Wardlaw 3/12 [6]

England won by 51 runs
Sinovich Park, Pretoria
Umpires: B Goldwin and Duma Ntuli

- England won the toss and elected to bat.
