= South Africa women's cricket team in England in 1997 =

South African women's cricket team in England in 1997
	England	South Africa
- Dates: 12 August 1997 – 30 August 1997
Captains	Karen Smithies	Kim Price

One Day International series
- Results: England won the 5-match series 2–1
Most runs	Charlotte Edwards 151	Linda Olivier 176
Most wickets	Sue Redfern 9	Cindy Eksteen 4

The South Africa national women's cricket team toured England in 1997, playing five women's One Day Internationals.

== One Day International series ==
=== 1st ODI ===
15 August 1997
Scorecard

England; 227/6 (50 overs)	v	South Africa; 148/9 (50 overs)
Susan Metcalfe 51* (58); Alta Kotze 1/38 (10 overs)		Helen Davies 64 (95); Sue Redfern 4/21 (10 overs)

England won by 79 runs
County Ground, Bristol
Umpires: Lorraine Elgar and Judith West

- South Africa won the toss and elected to field.

=== 2nd ODI ===
17 August 1997
Scorecard

England; 253/5 (50 overs)	v	South Africa; 254/8 (50 overs)
Charlotte Edwards 102 (118); Kim Price 2/50 (10 overs)		Linda Olivier 60 (76); Sue Redfern 2/41 (10 overs)

South Africa won by 2 wickets
County Ground, Taunton
Umpires: Alan Fox and Kathy Taylor
Player of the match: Charlotte Edwards (Eng)

- England won the toss and elected to bat.

=== 3rd ODI ===
20 August 1997
Scorecard

South Africa; 134 (46.3 overs)	v	England; 135/3 (40.3 overs)
Linda Olivier 57 (83); Karen Smithies 3/15 (10 overs)		Barbara Daniels 53 (86); Cindy Eksteen 2/24 (10 overs)

England won by 7 wickets
Lord's, London
Umpires: Valerie Gibbens and Ann Roberts
Player of the match: Barbara Daniels (Eng)

- South Africa won the toss and elected to bat.

=== 4th ODI ===
27 August 1997
Scorecard

South Africa; 59/5 (27 overs)	v	England
Linda Olivier 34* (79); Sue Redfern 2/17 (6 overs)

No result
Leicester Road, Hinckley
Umpires: Alan Fox and John Hayes

- England won the toss and elected to field.

=== 5th ODI ===
30 August 1997
Scorecard

England	v	South Africa

Match abandoned without a ball bowled.
Campbell Park, Milton Keynes
Umpires: Ann Garton and Alan Heath

== Tour matches ==
=== 50-over match: South Africa women v England Under-23s women ===
12 August 1997
Scorecard

South Africa; 178/7 (50 overs)	v	England Under-23s Women; 173/4 (50 overs)
Daleen Terblanche 62 (105); Mandy Cawley 4/49 (4 overs)		Jo Robinson 60 (115); Kim Price 3/24 (10 overs)

South Africa won by 5 runs
Midland Bank Sports Ground, Beckenham
Umpires: Lorraine Elgar and Ann Garton

=== 3-day match: South Africa women v Women's Cricket Association President's XI ===
23–24 August 1997
Scorecard

Women's Cricket Association President's XI	v	South Africa
263/4d (89 overs); Ella Donnison 72 (145); Kim Price 2/39 (23 overs)		256/8 (93.4 overs); Kerri Laing 72 (118); Nicola Holt 3/50 (20.4 overs)

Match drawn
Christ Church Ground, Oxford
Umpires: David Bryant and Benita White
