= South Africa women's cricket team in Ireland in 1997 =

International cricket tour

South African women's cricket team in Ireland in 1997
	Ireland	South Africa
- Dates: 5 August 1997 – 8 August 1997
Captains	Miriam Grealey	Kim Price

One Day International series
- Results: South Africa won the 3-match series 3–0
Most runs	Catherine O'Neill 86	Linda Olivier 86
Most wickets	Barbara McDonald 5	Cindy Eksteen 7

The South Africa women's cricket team toured Ireland in 1997, South Africa's first international cricket series post-exclusion. The tour consisted of a three-match women's One Day International series, which South Africa won 3–0.

== One Day International series ==
=== 1st ODI ===
5 August 1997
Scorecard

South Africa; 175/5 (50.0 overs)	v	Ireland; 82 (34.4 overs)
Kerri Laing 56* (84); Catherine O'Neill 2/18 [10]		Catherine O'Neill 23* (59); Cindy Eksteen 4/4 [4.4]

South Africa women won by 93 runs
Civil Service Cricket Club, Belfast
Umpires: Scott McAlpine and Jimmy McCall
Player of the match: Kerri Laing (South Africa Women)

=== 2nd ODI ===
7 August 1997
Scorecard

South Africa; 135 (49.4 overs)	v	Ireland; 101 (45.1 overs)
Helen Davies 34 (78); Barbara McDonald 3/17 [10]		Catherine O'Neill 45 (92); Denise Reid 3/7 [5]

South Africa women won by 34 runs
Castle Avenue, Dublin
Umpires: Stu Daultrey and Liam Keegan
Player of the match: Catherine O'Neill (Ireland Women)

=== 3rd ODI ===
8 August 1997
Scorecard

Ireland; 132/8 (50.0 overs)	v	South Africa; 133/0 (38.4 overs)
Miriam Grealey 37 (77); Ally Kuylaars 3/26 [9]		Linda Olivier 56* (116)

South Africa women won by 10 wickets
Sydney Parade, Dublin
Umpires: Stu Daultrey and Liam Keegan
Player of the match: Linda Olivier (South Africa Women)
