= South Africa women's cricket team in Australia in 1998–99 =

South African women's cricket team in Australia in 1998–99
	Australia	South Africa
- Dates: 5 February 1999 – 8 February 1999
Captains	Belinda Clark	Linda Olivier

One Day International series
- Results: Australia won the 3-match series 2–0
Most runs	Lisa Keightley 99	Denise Reid 48
Most wickets	Cathryn Fitzpatrick 6	Helen Davies 4

The South Africa women's cricket team toured Australia in 1998–99, playing three women's One Day Internationals. Australia won the series 2–0, with the third match abandoned without a ball being bowled.

== One Day International series ==
=== 1st ODI ===
5 February 1999
Scorecard

Australia; 199/8 (50 overs)	v	South Africa; 107/9 (49 overs)
Lisa Keightley 83 (128); Helen Davies 4/23 (4 overs)		Denise Reid 48 (78); Cathryn Fitzpatrick 2/9 (10 overs)

Australia won by 92 runs
John Blanck Oval, Buderim
Umpires: Michael Jay and Michael Ralston

- South Africa won the toss and elected to field
- South Africa fined 1 over for slow over-rate

=== 2nd ODI ===
7 February 1999
Scorecard

Australia; 220/9 (50 overs)	v	South Africa; 120/7 (50 overs)
Karen Rolton 50 (79); Levona Lewis 3/50 (10 overs)		Kerri Laing 31 (100); Cathryn Fitzpatrick 4/12 (10 overs)

Australia won by 100 runs
Allan Border Field, Brisbane
Umpires: Greg Cubit and Kevin Horton

- South Africa won the toss and elected to field

=== 3rd ODI ===
8 February 1999
Scorecard

Australia	v	South Africa

Match abandoned without a ball bowled
The Gabba, Woolloongabba, Brisbane
Umpires: Geoff Morrow and Jim Torpey
