= South Africa women's cricket team in England in 2003 =

South African women's cricket team in England in 2003
	England	South Africa
- Dates: 31 July 2003 – 22 August 2003
Captains	Clare Connor	Alison Hodgkinson

Test series
- Result: England won the 2-match series 1–0
Most runs	Claire Taylor (308)	Charlize van der Westhuizen (159)
Most wickets	Lucy Pearson (9)	Cri-Zelda Brits (4); Leighshe Jacobs (4)

One Day International series
- Results: England won the 3-match series 2–1
Most runs	Laura Newton (172)	Daleen Terblanche (167)
Most wickets	Rosalie Birch (7)	Shandre Fritz (4); Nolu Ndzundzu (4)

The South Africa national women's cricket team toured England in 2003, playing two Test matches and three women's One Day Internationals. England won both series, the Test by 1–0 (with one match finishing as a draw) and the ODI by 2–1.

== Test series ==
=== 1st Test ===
7–10 August 2003
Scorecard

South Africa	v	England
316 (153.2 overs); Charlize van der Westhuizen 83 (164); Helen Wardlaw 3/53 (32 overs)		497 (139.5 overs); Claire Taylor 177 (287); Cri-Zelda Brits 2/68 (18 overs)
285/8d (121 overs); Alison Hodgkinson 95 (217); Rosalie Birch 3/57 (22 overs)

Match drawn
Denis Compton Oval, Shenley
Umpires: Lorraine Elgar (Eng) and Peter Hartley (Eng)

- South Africa won the toss and elected to bat.
- Rosalie Birch and Laura Spragg (Eng); Claire Cowan, Leighshe Jacobs, Johmari Logtenberg, Alicia Smith and Charlize van der Westhuizen (SA) made their Test debut.

=== 2nd Test ===
20–22 August 2003
Scorecard

South Africa	v	England
130 (51.3 overs); Daleen Terblanche 41 (79); Lucy Pearson 4/25 (16 overs)		455 (120.3 overs); Claire Taylor 131 (179); Josephine Barnard 2/25 (6.3 overs)
229 (94.4 overs); Cri-Zelda Brits 61 (67); Clare Taylor 3/5 (13 overs)

England won by an innings and 96 runs
County Ground, Taunton
Umpires: Mark Benson (Eng) and Graham Cooper (Eng)

- South Africa won the toss and elected to bat.
- Nolu Ndzundzu (SA) made her Test debut.

== One Day International series ==
=== 1st ODI ===
13 August 2003
Scorecard

England; 273/8 (50 overs)	v	South Africa; 98 (34.5 overs)
Charlotte Edwards 64 (91); Shandre Fritz 4/36 (7 overs)		Daleen Terblanche 51 (105); Rosalie Birch 3/21 (7 overs)

England won by 175 runs
County Ground, Chelmsford
Umpires: John Hayes (Eng) and Trevor Jesty (Eng)

- England won the toss and elected to bat.
- Rosalie Birch and Lydia Greenway (Eng); Shandre Fritz, Johmari Logtenberg, Alicia Smith, Claire Terblanche and Charlize van der Westhuizen (SA) made their ODI debut.

=== 2nd ODI ===
16 August 2003
Scorecard

South Africa; 210/6 (50 overs)	v	England; 199 (47.4 overs)
Daleen Terblanche 79 (105); Helen Wardlaw 2/27 (5 overs)		Laura Newton 68 (90); Cri-Zelda Brits 3/25 (9 overs)

South Africa won by 11 runs
County Ground, Bristol
Umpires: Richard Illingworth (Eng) and Ann Roberts (Eng)

- South Africa won the toss and elected to bat.
- Ashlyn Kilowan (SA) made her ODI debut.

=== 3rd ODI ===
17 August 2003
Scorecard

South Africa; 147 (50 overs)	v	England; 148/1 (34.4 overs)
Alison Hodgkinson 52* (118); Rosalie Birch 4/22 (7 overs)		Laura Newton 77* (117); Alicia Smith 1/32 (10 overs)

England won by 9 wickets
Sophia Gardens, Cardiff
Umpires: David Constant (Eng) and Ann Roberts (Eng)

- South Africa won the toss and elected to bat.

== Tour matches ==
31 July 2003
Scorecard

Sussex; 188/6 (45 overs)	v	South Africa; 164/9 (45 overs)
Clare Connor 97* (131); Cri-Zelda Brits 2/54 (9 overs)		Daleen Terblanche 49 (73); Clare Connor 4/24 (6 overs)

Sussex won by 24 runs
Fenner's, Cambridge
Umpires: Alan Fox (Eng) and John Hayes (Eng)

- South Africa won the toss and elected to field.
- Rain delayed the start and the match was reduced to 45 overs per side.

3 August 2003
Scorecard

Marylebone Cricket Club women 157 (45.5 overs)	v	South Africa; 112 (45.2 overs)
Claire Taylor 48; Alicia Smith 3/23 (10 overs)		Alison Hodgkinson 22; Radhika Nanalal 3/19 (10 overs)

Marylebone Cricket Club won by 45 runs
Cricket Ground, Stokenchurch
Umpires: John Harris (Eng) and Gary Sutton (Eng)

- Marylebone Cricket Club won the toss and elected to bat.

4 August 2003
Scorecard

South Africa; 179 (49.3 overs)	v	England Development Squad women 169 (50 overs)
Josephine Barnard 31 (49); Sarah Clarke 3/25 (10 overs)		Kathryn Doherty 42* (55); Leighshe Jacobs 3/18 (10 overs)

South Africa won by 10 runs
Marston College, Oxford
Umpires: Graham Cooper (Eng) and Alan Fox (Eng)

- South Africa won the toss and elected to bat.

5 August 2003
Scorecard

South Africa; 167/8 (50 overs)	v	England Development Squad women 168/3 (45 overs)
Alison Hodgkinson 56 (89); Steph Davies 3/32 (7 overs)		Arran Brindle 84* (128); Charlize van der Westhuizen 2/32 (8 overs)

England Development Squad won by 7 wickets
Marston College, Oxford
Umpires: Graham Cooper (Eng) and Alan Fox (Eng)

- South Africa won the toss and elected to bat.
