= Rista Stoop =

South African cricketer (born 1970)

Personal information
- Full name: Rista Stoop
- Born: 7 October 1970 (age 56); Pietermaritzburg, South Africa
- Batting: Right-handed
- Bowling: Right-arm medium
- Role: All-rounder

International information
- National side: South Africa (1997)
- ODI debut (cap 10): 5 August 1997 v Ireland
- Last ODI: 20 August 1997 v England

Domestic team information
- Years: Team
- 1997/98: KwaZulu-Natal

Career statistics
Competition	WODI	WLA
Matches	4	5
Runs scored	70	78
Batting average	23.33	26.00
100s/50s	0/0	0/0
Top score	36*	36*
Balls bowled	96	156
Wickets	0	0
Bowling average	–	–
5 wickets in innings	0	0
10 wickets in match	0	0
Best bowling	–	–
Catches/stumpings	0/–	0/–
- Source: CricketArchive, 24 February 2022

Rista Stoop (born 7 October 1970) is a South African former cricketer who played as a right-arm medium bowler and right-handed batter. She appeared in four One Day Internationals for South Africa in 1997, all on their tour of Ireland and England. She played domestic cricket for KwaZulu-Natal.
