= Cri-Zelda Brits =

South African cricketer (b. 1983)

Personal information
- Full name: Cri-Zelda Brits
- Born: 20 November 1983 (age 42); Rustenburg, Transvaal, South Africa
- Nickname: Gris
- Batting: Right-handed
- Bowling: Right-arm medium-fast
- Role: Batter

International information
- National side: South Africa (2002–2013)
- Test debut (cap 27): 19 March 2002 v India
- Last Test: 28 July 2007 v Netherlands
- ODI debut (cap 31): 7 March 2002 v India
- Last ODI: 15 February 2013 v Sri Lanka
- ODI shirt no.: 18
- T20I debut (cap 2): 10 August 2007 v New Zealand
- Last T20I: 20 January 2013 v West Indies

Domestic team information
- Years: Team
- 2003/04: Western Province
- 2004: Kent
- 2004/05: Northerns
- 2005/06–2007/08: North West
- 2007/08: Free State
- 2008/09–2015/16: Gauteng

Career statistics
Competition	WTest	WODI	WT20I	WLA
Matches	4	69	19	152
Runs scored	150	1,622	405	4,195
Batting average	21.42	28.96	27.00	35.25
100s/50s	0/1	1/11	0/2	7/25
Top score	61	107*	57*	126*
Balls bowled	507	817	–	1,754
Wickets	6	22	–	45
Bowling average	42.50	26.40	–	26.08
5 wickets in innings	0	0	–	0
10 wickets in match	0	0	–	0
Best bowling	2/68	4/37	–	4/16
Catches/stumpings	2/–	22/–	3/–	69/6
- Source: CricketArchive, 4 December 2025

Cri-Zelda Brits (/kriːˈzɛldə/), also written Crizelda Brits and Cri-zelda Brits (born 20 November 1983) is a South African cricketer. A right-handed batter and right-arm medium-fast bowler, Brits was originally called up to the South Africa national women's cricket team as an opening bowler in 2002. She developed into an all-rounder, and since 2005 has established herself as a specialist batter. She captained South Africa in 23 matches in 2007 and 2008, but was replaced as captain in 2009 in order to "concentrate entirely on her own performance." She was reappointed as captain for the 2010 ICC Women's World Twenty20. Between 2007 and 2011 she captained South Africa a total of 36 times (1 Test, 23 One Day Internationals and 12 Twenty20 Internationals).

She is one of South Africa women's most prolific batsmen; being the first South African woman to have scored a half-century in a Twenty20 International.

== Career ==
=== Early career ===
Born in Rustenburg, Transvaal, Brits began her cricket career aged 11 when she entered the sport playing in boys' teams. At the age of 14, Brits made two appearances for South Africa Under-21s women against the touring England side in 1998, playing as wicket-keeper during two 50-over contests. In the first, an eight run victory for South Africa, she claimed a stumping and a catch but was not required to bat. For the second match, she was promoted up the order from number eight to number five and made 14 runs off 13 balls as South Africa lost by 42 runs.

Four years later, Brits made her full international debut in a One Day International against India women. Brits was selected as a bowler, placed at number nine in the batting order, and opening the bowling for South Africa. The match was first shortened and then abandoned, and Brits only bowled two overs, conceding two runs, before the conclusion. Brits retained this role in the second ODI, claiming two wickets as South Africa won by 29 runs using the Duckworth–Lewis method. She claimed three further wickets in the final two ODIs of the series. In the fourth ODI, she was promoted up the batting order to number five, though she only managed to score ten runs as South Africa failed to chase down an Indian total of 160. At the conclusion of the ODI series, the two sides played a Test match, with Brits reprising her role as opening bowler. She took two wickets and conceded 91 runs (2/91) as India amassed 404/9 declared in their first-innings. Despite her move up the batting order in the shorter format of the game, Brits batted as part of the tail during the Test match, scoring nine runs at number eleven in the first-innings and then as South Africa were forced to follow-on, she made eleven runs from number ten in the second-innings.

=== England series: 2003, 2003–04 ===
She reprised this role for South Africa during their 2003 tour of England. During three 50-over warm-up matches, Brits claimed four wickets and scored 33 runs while opening the bowling and batting as part of the tail. During the first Test, Brits showed her ability with the bat, scoring 32 runs as part of a 59-run partnership with fellow tail-ender Sune van Zyl. She claimed two wickets in England's response, claiming the wickets of opener Charlotte Edwards and captain Clare Connor. In the following ODIs, she claimed three wickets, all in the second match, as England claimed the series 2–1. Unrequired to bat during South Africa's solitary victory, she made ducks in both the other matches. She continued her string of ducks in the first-innings of the second Test, falling leg before wicket (lbw) facing her eighth delivery. However, after claiming two English wickets, Brits top-scored for South Africa in the second-innings, making 61 off 67 balls, including 13 fours. Despite this innings, South Africa lost the match by an innings and 96 runs.

In the South African summer of 2003–04, England women toured South Africa, playing five ODIs. In the first match, Brits claimed three wickets as England were restricted to 151, a total South Africa passed with the last ball of the allocated 50 overs. Brits went wicket-less in the next two matches, both England victories, but claimed another three wickets in the fourth match of the series. Despite her wickets, England set South Africa a total of 242 to chase, and Brits was moved up the batting order to open the innings alongside Terblanche. The tactic failed: South Africa needed to score almost five runs an over to win the match, and when Brits was dismissed in the fourteenth over for 20, the pair had only scored 38 runs, roughly two and a half runs an over. South Africa finished on 142/9, over a hundred runs short of their target. For the 2004 season, Brits joined Kent women, playing in all five of their Women's County Championship matches. She finished the competition with eight wickets, including a four-wicket haul against Yorkshire in her final match.

=== Women's Cricket World Cup in South Africa: 2005 ===
Brits was named as part of the South African squad to compete in the 2005 Women's Cricket World Cup. Prior to the tournament, South Africa played two ODIs against England. Brits opened the innings alongside Terblanche in both matches, as she would continue to do throughout the World Cup, and made scores of 23 and 11. She enjoyed more success during the tournament itself, finishing as South Africa's leading run-scorer with 206 runs, 92 more than her closest compatriot, Shandre Fritz. Her five wickets ranked her second among South African women behind Alicia Smith. During South Africa's second round-robin match, against the West Indies women, Brits made both her highest score of the tournament, making 72, and her best bowling analysis, taking four wickets. She received the man of the match award for her achievement, as South Africa won the match by one run. Though she did not make any further half-centuries during the tournament, she was twice dismissed in the forties, scoring 49 against Australia women and 46 against England women.

Despite Brits's relative success in the tournament, the win against the West Indies women was South Africa's only victory, and they finished the group stage in seventh place, meaning that they failed to qualify for the knockout phase. A three match ODI series was hastily arranged against the West Indies women, who had also been eliminated. By this stage, Brits was starting to bowl less frequently. She had opened the bowling in three of South Africa's World Cup fixtures, but did not bowl at all against England women, and was used as the fourth-change bowler against Sri Lanka women, bowling only four overs. Against the West Indies women, Brits bowled two overs in the first match, being used as the first-change bowler, and has only bowled once in ODI cricket since. Her good form with the bat continued against the West Indies women as she passed 50 in two of the three matches, 2004/05 though the West Indies won the series 2–1.

=== Pakistan series, Afro-Asia Cup: 2006–07, 2007 ===
An injury to Fritz, who had been selected as South African captain for the home series against Pakistan in 2006–07, saw Brits named as her replacement eight days before the first ODI. South Africa women won the first match of the series by 98 runs, with Brits scoring 39 runs from 42 balls, including 6 fours, in "an attractive cameo". She top-scored for South Africa in the second and third matches with half-centuries, helping to secure the series victory. South Africa eventually won the series 4–0, and Brits was named as player of the series, having scored 183 runs and captained South Africa to their first series win since beating India women in 2002. Brits was subsequently named as captain of the African women side to compete in a Twenty20 match against an Asian women XI during the 2007 Afro-Asia Cup. The side, which contained four South Africans, lost by 60 runs. Brits was one of ten African players to be dismissed with a single-figure score, and five members of the team were dismissed for ducks.

=== European tour: 2007 ===
South Africa began their preparation for the 2008 Women's World Cup Qualifying series with a tour of Europe, beginning with a Test match and an ODI series against Netherlands women, and then moving into England for more ODIs. Brits remained as South African captain for the tour, and became the only South African to captain her side to a woman's Test victory, as they beat Netherlands by 159 runs. Although Brits had only managed a score of 21 in the first-innings of the Test match, and had declared with herself unbeaten on 5 in the second, she showed her continued form with the bat by scoring 46 in the first ODI and 59 in the second, partnering Daleen Terblanche in a 131-run third wicket stand, a South African record for that wicket. A century from Johmari Logtenberg in the final ODI helped South Africa secure a 3–0 series whitewash.

Once in England, South Africa played two 50-over contests against an England Development Squad, each side taking one win apiece, Brits top-scoring in South Africa's victory with 78 runs. This was followed by South Africa's first two Twenty20 Internationals, against New Zealand women and England women at the County Ground, Taunton. The first match, against New Zealand, was marked by a spate of run outs, each team having four players dismissed in this fashion. South Africa lost by 97 runs, with Brits one of only three players to make it into double-figures, scoring 23 at just under a-run-a-ball. In the second match, held on the same day, South Africa again struggled for runs, with Brits this time being one of four players to make it out of single figures as South Africa lost by 86 runs.

=== World Cup Qualifying Series: 2007/08 ===
In order to qualify for the 2009 Women's Cricket World Cup in Australia, South Africa had to compete in the qualifying series, which they hosted in Stellenbosch, the event having been postponed and then cancelled in Pakistan due to security concerns. Brits was not required to bat in the first match, a ten-wicket victory over Bermuda in which eight of the Bermudans failed to score a run, and the remaining three were all dismissed for just one apiece. After scoring 17 in the second match, against Papua New Guinea, Brits made her highest score in One Day International cricket in the next match, against Netherlands. Coming in at number three after opener Daleen Terblanche had been dismissed for a duck after five balls of the match, Brits batted through the remainder of the innings and finished on 107 not out. Brits only managed 3 in the victory against Ireland in the semi-finals which guaranteed South Africa a place in the 2009 World Cup, and was dismissed for a duck in the final as South Africa easily overcame Pakistan to win the competition. Brits was named as the 2008 CSA Women's Cricketer of the Year.

=== United Kingdom tour: 2008 ===
Brits represented Central women during the Pro20 Women's Super4's in 2008, and finished the tournament with 103 runs, trailing only Highveld's Mignon du Preez, who scored the competition's only half-century. Upon the completion of the competition, the national team flew over to Ireland to begin their tour of the United Kingdom which started with an ODI just four days later. South Africa enjoyed a comfortable ten-wicket victory in the tour opener, with Brits bowling an expensive two overs, conceding 17 runs including eight wides. She had not bowled in international cricket since 2005, and has not again since. After making 13 in the Twenty20 match against the Irish, Brits fell for successive ducks in a 20-over match against England Academy and the first ODI against England. She continued to struggle with the bat in the remaining three ODIs, failing to pass 20 as England eased to a 4–0 series win. She dropped down the order for the Twenty20 matches, batting at five and six, but after remaining 20 not out at the close of play in the first match, she was dismissed for 2 in both the following games.

=== Cricket World Cup, World Twenty20: 2009 ===
Following their successful qualifying campaign, South Africa were one of eight women's teams represented in the 2009 Women's Cricket World Cup. Prior to the tournament, it had been announced that Sunette Loubser would replace Brits as captain of the national team. Denise Reid, the convenor of selectors, stated that the change had been made in order for Brits to "concentrate entirely on her own performance" as "[South Africa] require her undivided attention at the role assigned to her". During her time as captain, Brits had averaged 32.07 with the bat, however twelve of her sixteen matches were against Ireland, Pakistan and Netherlands women, teams that South Africa had beaten easily in the World Cup Qualifying Series; against the more competitive England side, she had averaged a much lower 8.75 with the bat. Brits made modest totals in the two warm-up matches against India and Pakistan, but averaged 33.00 in the World Cup matches, second among the South African team behind Trisha Chetty. After scoring 7 against the West Indies in their first match, she made 36 against reigning World Champions Australia. South Africa finished the group-stage winless when they suffered a 199 run defeat to New Zealand in the final group match; chasing 250, South Africa only managed to make 51, with Brits's score of 25 making her the only South African to make it into double figures. Brits remained 31 not out in the seventh place play-off as South Africa successfully chased down the Sri Lankan score of 75 with over 20 overs to spare.

Brits finished the 2009 ICC Women's World Twenty20 as South Africa's top-scorer with 71 runs. Her half-century against New Zealand in the second match is the highest score by a South African woman in a Twenty20 International, surpassing the record of 38 set only four days earlier by du Preez. Despite her record, South Africa lost to the New Zealanders by 6 wickets, though Brits had the small consolation of being named man of the match. Brits scored seven runs in each of the other matches for South Africa, both defeats, against West Indies and Australia respectively.

=== West Indies series: 2009–10 ===
South Africa and Brits had a point to prove during their 2009–10 series against the West Indies, and were keen to improve on their recent performances. Brits top-scored for the South Africans in the first of four ODIs with 48, but an unbeaten century from West Indies opener Stafanie Taylor helped the tourists to chase down the total and win with 51 balls remaining. Brits made 31 in the second match as South Africa levelled the series, and then scored a match-winning 60 not out in the third match to give South Africa the lead in the series. During this innings, she became only the second South African woman to pass 1,000 career ODI runs. Brits missed the following Twenty20 series with bronchitis.
