= Debby Hughes =

South African cricketer (born 1977)

Personal information
- Full name: Deborah Hughes
- Born: 23 August 1977 (age 49); Bloemfontein, South Africa
- Batting: Right-handed
- Bowling: Right-arm fast
- Role: Bowler

International information
- National side: South Africa (1997)
- ODI debut (cap 5): 5 August 1997 v Ireland
- Last ODI: 8 August 1997 v Ireland

Career statistics
Competition	WODI
Matches	2
Runs scored	–
Batting average	–
100s/50s	–
Top score	–
Balls bowled	78
Wickets	1
Bowling average	37.00
5 wickets in innings	0
10 wickets in match	0
Best bowling	1/17
Catches/stumpings	0/–
- Source: CricketArchive, 6 March 2022

Deborah Hughes (born 23 August 1977) is a South African former cricketer who played as a right-arm pace bowler. She appeared in two One Day Internationals for South Africa in 1997, both against Ireland.
