= India women's national cricket team record by opponent =

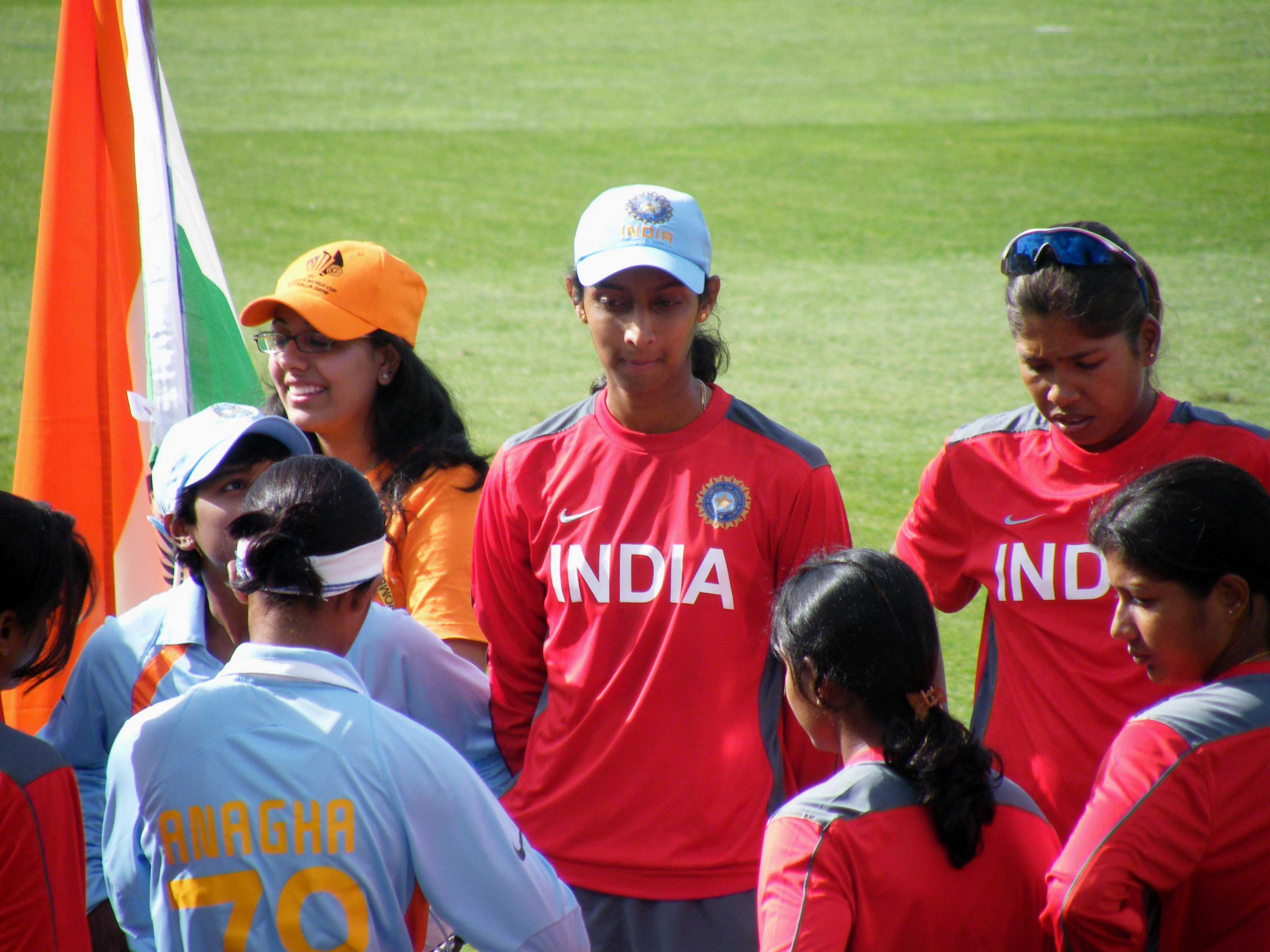
Members of the Indian cricket team before a Women's World Twenty20 game in Sydney, 2009

The India women's national cricket team represents India in international women's cricket. A full member of the International Cricket Council (ICC), the team is governed by the Board of Control for Cricket in India (BCCI). The India women's national cricket team first competed in 1976 when they played the West Indies in a six-match Test series at home. They recorded their first victory in the fourth match held at the Moin-ul-Haq Stadium, Patna; however, a loss in the sixth match led to the series being tied. India secured their first overseas victory in a one-off series against South Africa in 2002. As of July 2026, they have played 43 Test matches against five different opponents—Australia, England, South Africa, New Zealand and the West Indies. In terms of victories, they have been most successful against England, with three wins against them.

India played their first Women's One Day International cricket (WODI) match against England in the 1978 World Cup, which they hosted. They finished at the bottom of the table as they lost the remaining two games of the group stage. In the 1982 World Cup, they won their first ever WODI match when they beat the International XI by 79 runs at McLean Park, Napier. India's first overseas WODI series win came at the 1994–95 New Zealand Women's Centenary Tournament. They won the WODI series during their tour 1999 of England. They were the runner-up at the 2005 and the 2017 World Cup tournaments. India became the first Asian team to win the World Cup after clinching their maiden title on home soil in 2025. As of October 2026, they have played 348 WODIs against thirteen different opponents, and have the fourth highest number of victories (191) for any team in the format; They have recorded 134 wins and have been the third most successful team in the T20I format. Since their first Women's Twenty20 International (WT20I) against England in August 2006, India have played 236 matches. They have been most successful against Sri Lanka with 27 wins against them. They were among the semi-finalists in the 2009, 2010, 2018 and 2023 ICC Women's World Twenty20 tournaments. India finished as the runners-up once in the tournament's history, in 2020.

== Key ==
- M – Denotes the number of matches played
- W – Denotes the number of wins for India against the listed opponent
- L – Denotes the number of losses for India against the listed opponent
- T – Denotes the number of ties between India and the listed opponent
- D – Denotes the number of draws between India and the listed opponent
- NR – Denotes the number of no results between India and the listed opponent
- Tie+W – Number of matches tied and then won in a tiebreaker such as a bowl-out or Super Over
- Tie+L – Number of matches tied and then lost in a tiebreaker such as a bowl-out or Super Over
- Win% – Win percentage (in ODI and T20I cricket, a tie counts as half a win, and no results are disregarded)
- Loss% – Loss percentage
- Draw% – Draw percentage
- First – Year of the first match between India and the listed opponent
- Last – Year of the latest match between India and the listed opponent

== Test cricket ==
India women Test cricket record by opponent
Opponent	M	W	L	D	Win%	Loss%	Draw%	First	Last
Australia	12	1	5	6	8.33	41.66	50.00	1977	2026
England	16	4	1	11	25.00	6.25	68.75	1986	2026
New Zealand	6	0	0	6	0.00	0.00	100.00	1977	2003
South Africa	3	3	0	0	100.00	0.00	0.00	2002	2024
West Indies	6	1	1	4	16.66	16.66	66.66	1976	1976
Total	43	9	7	27	20.93	16.28	62.79	1976	2026
Statistics are correct as of India v England at London as of 13 July 2026.

== One Day International ==
India women One Day International record by opponent
Opponent	M	W	L	T	NR	Win%	First	Last
Australia	64	12	52	0	0	18.75	1978	2026
Bangladesh	9	6	1	1	1	75.00	2013	2025
Denmark	1	1	0	0	0	100.00	1993	1993
England	80	36	42	0	2	45.00	1978	2025
International XI	3	3	0	0	0	100.00	1982	1982
Ireland	15	15	0	0	0	100.00	1993	2025
Netherlands	3	3	0	0	0	100.00	1993	2000
New Zealand	58	23	34	1	0	39.66	1978	2025
Pakistan	12	12	0	0	0	100.00	2005	2025
South Africa	35	21	13	0	1	60.00	1997	2025
Sri Lanka	36	32	3	0	1	88.89	2000	2025
West Indies	29	24	5	0	0	82.76	1993	2024
Zimbabwe	3	3	0	0	0	100.00	2026	2026
Total	348	191	150	2	5	55.97	1978	2026
Statistics are correct as of India v Zimbabwe at Baroda Cricket Association Stadium, Vadodara, 28 October 2026

== Twenty20 International ==
India women Twenty20 International record by opponent
Opponent	M	W	L	T	Tie+W	Tie+L	NR	Win%	First	Last
Australia	39	9	28	0	1	0	1	23.08	2008	2026
Bangladesh	26	23	3	0	0	0	0	88.46	2013	2026
Barbados	1	1	0	0	0	0	0	100.00	2022	2022
England	38	12	26	0	0	0	0	31.58	2006	2026
Hong Kong	1	1	0	0	0	0	0	100.00	2026	2026
Ireland	2	2	0	0	0	0	0	100.00	2018	2023
Japan	1	1	0	0	0	0	0	100.00	2026	2026
Malaysia	3	2	0	0	0	0	1	66.67	2018	2023
Nepal	1	1	0	0	0	0	0	100	2024	2024
Netherlands	1	1	0	0	0	0	0	100	2026	2026
New Zealand	14	4	10	0	0	0	0	28.57	2009	2024
Pakistan	18	15	3	0	0	0	0	83.33	2009	2026
South Africa	25	11	11	0	0	0	3	44	2014	2026
Sri Lanka	33	27	5	0	0	0	1	81.81	2009	2026
Thailand	4	4	0	0	0	0	0	100	2018	2026
United Arab Emirates	2	2	0	0	0	0	0	100	2022	2023
West Indies	24	15	9	0	0	0	0	62.50	2011	2024
Zimbabwe	3	3	0	0	0	0	0	100	2026	2026
Total	236	134	95	0	1	0	6	58.69	2006	2026
Statistics are correct as of India v Zimbabwe at Shaheed Veer Narayan Singh International Cricket Stadium, Raipur 20 October 2026
