= Rozelle Scheepers =

South African cricketer (born 1974)

Personal information
- Full name: Rozelle Scheepers
- Born: 27 September 1974 (age 52); Pretoria, South Africa
- Batting: Right-handed
- Role: Wicket-keeper

International information
- National side: South Africa (2000)
- Only ODI (cap 27): 28 June 2000 v England

Domestic team information
- Years: Team
- 1996/97–1998/99: Northerns

Career statistics
| Competition | WODI | WLA |
|---|---|---|
| Matches | 1 | 2 |
| Runs scored | 5 | 5 |
| Batting average | 5.00 | 5.00 |
| 100s/50s | 0/0 | 0/0 |
| Top score | 5 | 5 |
| Catches/stumpings | 1/0 | 3/0 |
- Source: CricketArchive, 26 February 2022

Rozelle Scheepers (born 27 September 1974) is a South African former cricketer who played as a wicket-keeper and right-handed batter. She appeared in one One Day International for South Africa in 2000, against England. She played domestic cricket for Northerns.
