= List of South Africa women ODI cricketers =

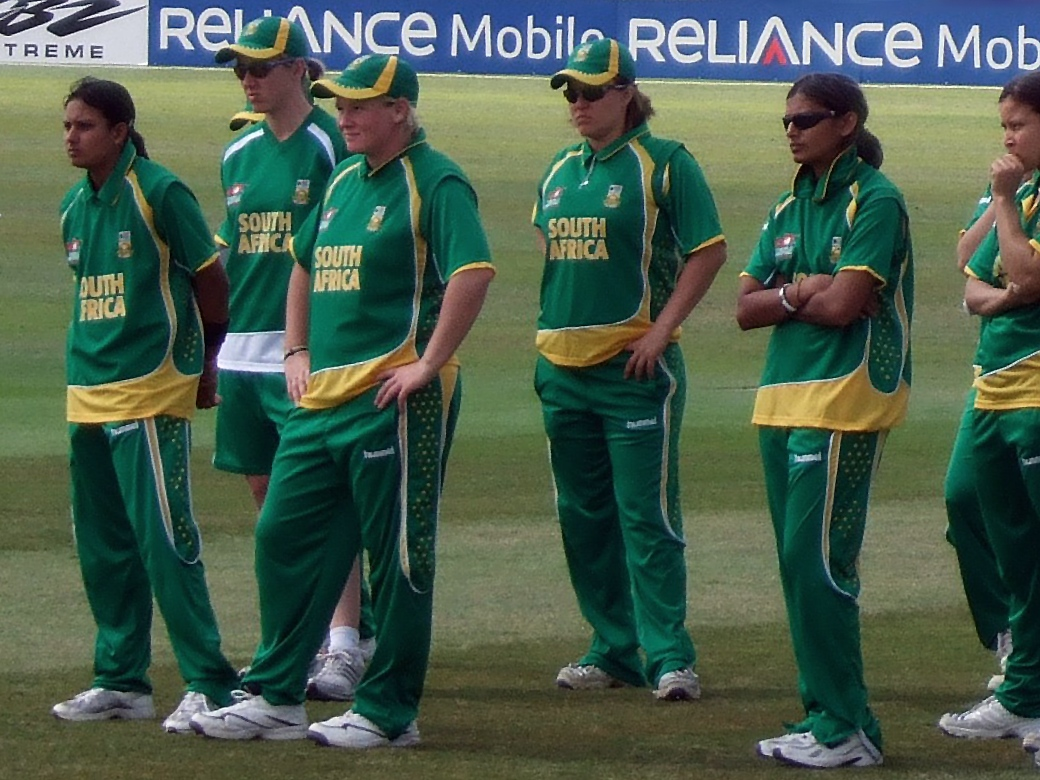
South Africa women at Taunton, 2009 ICC Women's World Twenty20

A One Day International (ODI) is an international cricket match between two teams, each having ODI status, as determined by the International Cricket Council. The women's variant of the game is similar to the men's version, with minor modifications to umpiring and pitch requirements. The first women's ODI was played in 1973, between England and Australia. Due to the sporting boycott placed upon their country, South Africa women did not contest their first ODI until August 1997, playing Ireland in Belfast.

In total, South Africa women's team has played 245 WODIs. Mignon du Preez is the most capped player, having appeared in 154 ODIs and the leading run-scorer with 3,760 runs. Laura Wolvaardt's score of 184 not out against the Sri Lanka in 2024 is the highest score in women's ODI cricket by a South African. Shabnim Ismail has claimed more ODI wickets than any other South African woman, having taken 191 and also has the best return by a South African bowler, having claimed six wickets (6/10) in an innings in a Women's World Cup qualifying match against the Netherlands.

Since the team was formed, 92 women have represented South Africa in One Day International cricket. This list includes all players who have played at least one ODI match and is initially arranged in the order of debut appearance. Where more than one player won their first cap in the same match, those players are initially listed alphabetically by last name at the time of debut.

== Key ==
General

- ‡ – Captain
- † – Wicket-keeper
- First – Year of debut
- Last – Year of latest game
- Mat – Number of matches played
- Win% – Winning percentage

Batting

- Runs – Runs scored in career
- HS – Highest score
- 100 – Centuries scored
- 50 – Half-centuries scored
- Avg – Runs scored per dismissal
- * – Batsman remained not out

Bowling

- Balls – Balls bowled in career
- Wkt – Wickets taken in career
- BBI – Best bowling in an innings
- Ave – Average runs per wicket

Fielding

- Ca – Catches taken
- St – Stumpings taken

== Players ==
Statistics are correct as of 4 April 2026.

No.	Name	First	Last	Mat	Batting					Bowling					Fielding		Ref
No.	Name	First	Last	Mat	Runs	HS	100	50	Avg	Balls	Wkt	BBI	Ave	5WI	Ca	St	Ref
1	Alicia Bezuidenhout	1997	1997	6	21	17	0	0	10.50	60	1	1/40	53.00	0	0	0	
2	Anina Burger	1997	2000	18	259	52*	0	1	19.92	–	–	–	–	–	6	0	
3	Helen Davies	1997	2000	25	432	64	0	1	18.78	646	15	4/23	28.66	0	2	0	
4	Cindy Eksteen ‡	1997	2004	36	435	62	0	1	16.11	1,486	28	4/4	30.82	0	7	0	
5	Debby Hughes	1997	1997	2	–	–	–	–	–	78	1	1/17	37.00	0	0	0	
6	Alta Kotze	1997	1999	15	95	30	0	0	13.57	623	8	2/14	49.25	0	2	0	
7	Kerri Laing	1997	2002	23	385	91*	0	3	21.38	378	8	3/4	25.87	0	9	0	
8	Linda Olivier ‡	1997	2000	28	838	101*	1	7	34.91	180	4	2/10	23.75	0	3	0	
9	Kim Price ‡	1997	2000	26	109	22	0	0	9.08	952	20	3/14	24.10	0	5	0	
10	Rista Stoop	1997	1997	4	70	36*	0	0	23.33	96	0	–	–	–	0	0	
11	Daleen Terblanche †	1997	2008	61	1,256	114*	1	5	23.69	36	0	–	–	–	28	11	
12	Leslie Korkie	1997	1999	7	20	12	0	0	4.00	24	0	–	–	–	1	0	
13	Ally Kuylaars	1997	2000	23	205	74*	0	2	17.08	338	10	3/26	23.30	0	6	0	
14	Denise Reid	1997	2002	29	275	56	0	1	13.75	408	12	3/7	24.08	0	2	0	
15	Lynn Sing	1997	1997	1	–	–	–	–	–	–	–	–	–	–	0	0	
16	Elizabeth Akehurst	1997	1999	8	109	35*	0	0	15.57	168	1	1/24	84.00	0	2	0	
17	Belinda Dermota	1997	1997	3	0	0	0	0	0.00	12	0	–	–	–	0	0	
18	Anne Stears	1997	1997	2	5	5*	0	0	–	–	–	–	–	–	0	0	
19	Karin Swart	1997	1997	3	0	0	0	0	0.00	72	2	2/23	16.50	0	0	0	
20	Levona Lewis	1999	2000	9	17	10*	0	0	–	335	10	4/20	23.70	0	1	0	
21	Sune van Zyl	1999	2004	18	85	21	0	0	10.62	654	11	4/23	40.45	0	2	0	
22	Debbie Carr	1999	1999	2	3	3	0	0	3.00	60	0	–	–	–	0	0	
23	Evne Webber	1999	1999	1	6	6	0	0	6.00	–	–	–	–	–	0	0	
24	Alison Hodgkinson ‡	2000	2012	38	598	71	0	2	18.12	114	1	1/18	59.00	0	11	0	
25	Yulandi van der Merwe	2000	2003	18	111	42*	0	0	22.20	776	14	3/25	41.14	0	3	0	
26	Sunette Viljoen	2000	2002	17	198	54*	0	1	16.50	228	5	3/27	33.20	0	3	0	
27	Rozelle Scheepers †	2000	2000	1	5	5	0	0	5.00	–	–	–	–	–	1	0	
28	Nolu Ndzundzu	2000	2005	16	14	5*	0	0	7.00	564	8	2/16	38.00	0	3	0	
29	Hanri Strydom	2000	2004	8	122	46	0	0	17.42	140	3	3/33	42.33	0	2	0	
30	Josephine Barnard	2002	2004	8	122	32	0	0	15.25	108	2	2/33	42.50	0	0	0	
31	Cri-Zelda Brits ‡	2002	2013	69	1,622	107*	1	11	28.96	817	22	4/37	26.40	0	22	0	
32	Madelein Lotter	2002	2002	1	0	0	0	0	0.00	–	–	–	–	–	0	0	
33	Tamara Reeves †	2002	2005	4	20	14	0	0	5.00	–	–	–	–	–	2	0	
34	Shandre Fritz	2003	2014	59	959	68	0	5	21.31	742	22	4/36	23.00	0	15	0	
35	Johmari Logtenberg	2003	2007	26	848	153*	2	5	38.54	297	11	3/6	18.72	0	5	0	
36	Alicia Smith ‡	2003	2009	37	557	68	0	1	20.62	1,699	50	5/7	21.18	1	6	0	
37	Claire Terblanche	2003	2009	21	289	61	0	1	22.23	180	3	1/4	39.66	0	8	0	
38	Charlize van der Westhuizen	2003	2009	33	165	25*	0	0	10.31	1,519	26	4/30	31.30	0	7	0	
39	Ashlyn Kilowan	2003	2009	32	124	21	0	0	10.33	1,347	33	4/23	23.57	0	7	0	
40	Shafeeqa Pillay †	2004	2005	12	50	11*	0	0	6.25	48	1	1/16	16.00	0	11	2	
41	Lonell de Beer	2005	2007	11	11	6	0	0	3.66	400	9	3/10	25.55	0	4	0	
42	Angelique Taai	2005	2010	13	60	22*	0	0	12.00	214	2	1/15	61.00	0	0	0	
43	Susan Benade	2005	2013	29	414	58	0	1	15.33	877	19	2/11	31.63	0	9	0	
44	Trisha Chetty †	2007	2022	134	2,703	95	0	16	27.86	–	–	–	–	–	133	51	
45	Shabnim Ismail	2007	2022	127	472	34	0	0	10.26	6,170	191	6/10	19.95	2	42	0	
46	Marcia Letsoalo	2007	2017	68	68	14*	0	0	6.18	2,615	44	3/13	34.13	0	14	0	
47	Sunette Loubser ‡	2007	2014	60	306	27	0	0	12.75	2,724	80	5/27	17.38	1	23	0	
48	Annelie Minny	2007	2008	14	227	73	0	2	20.63	–	–	–	–	–	2	0	
49	Mignon du Preez ‡	2007	2022	154	3,760	116*	2	18	32.98	29	1	1/9	31.00	0	37	0	
50	Kirsten Blair	2007	2007	2	2	2	0	0	2.00	60	1	1/32	32.00	0	0	0	
51	Olivia Anderson	2008	2008	5	111	46*	0	0	37.00	–	–	–	–	–	0	0	
52	Dinesha Devnarain ‡	2008	2016	29	180	42	0	0	10.58	413	6	2/21	57.00	0	4	0	
53	Dane van Niekerk ‡	2009	2025	110	2,273	102	1	9	36.66	4,578	138	5/17	19.14	2	57	0	
54	Marizanne Kapp	2009	2025	162	3,511	121*	4	17	35.11	6,851	181	5/20	24.24	2	36	0	
55	Yolandi van der Westhuizen	2009	2012	8	40	20	0	0	5.71	–	–	–	–	–	4	0	
56	Kirstie Thomson	2009	2011	9	150	27	0	0	18.75	66	0	–	–	–	4	0	
57	Moseline Daniels	2010	2017	33	40	11*	0	0	10.00	1,397	28	4/25	33.25	0	10	0	
58	Masabata Klaas	2010	2025	88	168	15	0	0	6.00	3,286	86	4/25	32.11	0	14	0	
59	Jana Nell	2010	2010	2	–	–	–	–	–	–	–	–	–	–	0	0	
60	Chloe Tryon ‡	2011	2026	130	2,431	92	0	15	26.71	3,557	65	5/34	41.12	1	46	0	
61	Akhona Nyiki	2011	2011	1	0	0	0	0	0.00	54	2	2/32	16.00	0	0	0	
62	Ayabonga Khaka	2012	2025	121	164	18	0	0	5.29	5,527	151	6/56	26.29	2	32	0	
63	Suné Luus ‡	2012	2026	151	3,141	114	2	21	28.04	4,005	128	6/36	23.96	5	67	0	
64	Yolandi Potgieter	2013	2014	16	96	20	0	0	8.00	280	6	2/18	32.50	0	3	0	
65	Savanna Cordes †	2013	2013	2	11	11	0	0	5.50	–	–	–	–	–	3	0	
66	Elriesa Theunissen-Fourie	2013	2013	3	1	1	0	0	1.00	48	2	2/28	14.00	0	3	0	
67	Lizelle Lee ‡	2013	2022	100	3,315	132*	3	23	36.42	119	3	2/12	31.00	0	53	4	
68	Alexis le Breton	2013	2013	6	4	3*	0	0	4.00	–	–	–	–	–	2	0	
69	Nadine Moodley	2013	2015	9	80	54	0	1	10.00	–	–	–	–	–	0	0	
70	Bernadine Bezuidenhout (Note: Bernadine Bezuidenhout also played ODI cricket for New Zealand. Only her records for South Africa are given above.)	2014	2015	4	2	2	0	0	0.66	–	–	–	–	–	2	0	
71	Yolani Fourie	2014	2017	15	43	16*	0	0	8.60	486	12	3/20	28.66	0	3	0	
72	Andrie Steyn	2014	2022	39	938	117	1	6	26.80	–	–	–	–	–	12	0	
73	Nonkhululeko Thabethe	2014	2014	1	0	0	0	0	0.00	–	–	–	–	–	0	0	
74	Laura Wolvaardt‡	2016	2026	128	5,695	184*	13	40	51.30	–	–	–	–	–	51	0	
75	Odine Kirsten	2016	2017	9	35	22*	0	0	11.66	402	9	4/10	29.88	0	4	0	
76	Lara Goodall	2016	2026	58	961	93*	0	3	20.44	–	–	–	–	–	10	0	
77	Sinalo Jafta†	2016	2026	55	452	57*	0	0	15.58	–	–	–	–	–	48	4	
78	Anneke Bosch	2016	2026	30	500	91	0	3	20.83	156	1	1/29	134.00	0	10	0	
79	Nadine de Klerk	2017	2026	64	1058	84*	0	3	24.60	2,504	74	4/32	29.41	0	25	0	
80	Raisibe Ntozakhe	2017	2022	21	8	3*	0	0	2.00	882	16	3/16	35.93	0	4	0	
81	Zintle Mali	2018	2019	7	3	2	0	0	3.00	132	4	2/11	20.25	0	1	0	
82	Stacy Lackay	2018	2018	1	0	0	0	0	0.00	–	–	–	–	–	2	0	
83	Tumi Sekhukhune	2018	2026	38	56	17	0	0	8.00	1,615	35	3/50	38.85	0	6	0	
84	Faye Tunnicliffe †	2019	2026	6	84	47	0	0	21.00	12	1	1/8	8.00	0	8	0	
85	Nondumiso Shangase	2019	2026	22	163	55	0	1	13.58	737	15	2/19	45.60	0	6	0	
86	Nonkululeko Mlaba	2021	2026	54	63	16*	0	0	4.20	2,573	64	4/33	33.06	0	15	0	
87	Tazmin Brits	2021	2026	57	1838	171*	7	4	34.03	–	–	–	–	–	21	0	
88	Delmi Tucker	2022	2024	10	64	25	0	0	16.00	299	4	1/6	62.00	0	2	0	
89	Eliz-Mari Marx	2023	2025	9	53	35	0	0	53.00	336	7	2/22	42.71	0	2	0	
90	Ayanda Hlubi	2024	2026	12	15	6	0	0	5.00	474	10	3/50	48.70	0	2	0	
91	Annerie Dercksen	2024	2026	24	751	104	1	5	35.76	405	14	3/16	30.71	0	10	0	
92	Mieke de Ridder	2024	2024	3	45	26*	0	0	–	–	–	–	–	–	0	0	
93	Karabo Meso†	2025	2025	9	46	17	0	0	9.20	–	–	–	–	–	9	1	
94	Miane Smit	2025	2025	7	116	56*	0	1	29.00	144	4	2/40	34.50	0	3	0	
95	Seshnie Naidu	2025	2025	1	0	0	0	0	0.00	30	1	1/40	40.00	0	0	0	
96	Leah Jones	2025	2025	2	–	–	–	–	–	95	4	3/48	22.75	0	3	0	
97	Kayla Reyneke	2026	2026	2	51	42*	0	0	–	66	2	2/46	35.50	0	0	0	

== ODI captains ==
No.	Name	First	Last	Mat	Won	Lost	Tied	No Result	Win%
1	Kim Price	1997	2000	26	13	12	0	1	52.00%
2	Linda Olivier	1999	1999	3	0	3	0	0	0.00%
3	Cindy Eksteen	1999	2002	6	2	3	0	1	40.00%
4	Alison Hodgkinson	2003	2005	19	4	14	0	1	22.22%
5	Cri-Zelda Brits	2007	2011	23	16	6	0	1	72.72%
6	Sunette Loubser	2009	2009	7	3	3	1	0	50.00%
7	Alicia Smith	2009	2009	1	0	1	0	0	0.00%
8	Mignon du Preez	2011	2016	46	24	19	0	3	55.81%
9	Dinesha Devnarain	2016	2016	5	3	2	0	0	60.00%
10	Dane van Niekerk	2016	2021	50	29	18	2	1	61.22%
11	Lizelle Lee	2016	2016	1	0	1	0	0	0.00%
12	Suné Luus	2017	2022	34	19	11	2	2	62.50%
13	Chloe Tryon	2017	2018	5	3	3	0	0	60.00%
14	Laura Wolvaardt	2021	2026	50	28	21	0	1	57.14%
