= Lynn Sing =

South African cricketer (born 1961)

Personal information
- Full name: Lynn Helen Sing
- Born: 29 October 1961 (age 65); Durban, South Africa
- Batting: Right-handed
- Bowling: Right-arm medium
- Role: Batter

International information
- National side: South Africa (1997)
- Only ODI (cap 15): 8 August 1997 v Ireland

Career statistics
Competition	WODI	WFC	WLA
Matches	1	1	2
Runs scored	–	6	0
Batting average	–	6.00	0.00
100s/50s	–	0/0	0/0
Top score	–	6	0
Catches/stumpings	0/–	0/–	0/–
- Source: CricketArchive, 6 March 2022

Lynn Helen Sing (born 29 October 1961) is a South African former cricketer who played as a right-handed batter. She appeared in one One Day International for South Africa in 1997, against Ireland.
