= Nonkhululeko Thabethe =

South African cricketer (born 1992)

Personal information
- Full name: Nonkhululeko Peaceful Thabethe
- Born: 1 September 1992 (age 34); Johannesburg, South Africa
- Batting: Right-handed
- Bowling: Right-arm medium
- Role: All-rounder

International information
- National side: South Africa (2014)
- Only Test (cap 55): 16 November 2014 v India
- Only ODI (cap 73): 28 November 2014 v India
- Only T20I (cap 40): 30 November 2014 v India

Domestic team information
- Years: Team
- 2006/07–present: Central Gauteng

Career statistics
| Competition | WTest | WODI | WT20I | WLA |
|---|---|---|---|---|
| Matches | 1 | 1 | 1 | 116 |
| Runs scored | 2 | 0 | 0 | 1,441 |
| Batting average | 1.00 | 0.00 | 0 | 60 |
| 100s/50s | 0/0 | 0/0 | 0/0 | 0/5 |
| Top score | 2 | 0 | 0.00 | 16.75 |
| Balls bowled | – | – | – | 1,689 |
| Wickets | – | – | – | 56 |
| Bowling average | – | – | – | 17.08 |
| 5 wickets in innings | – | – | – | 0 |
| 10 wickets in match | – | – | – | 0 |
| Best bowling | – | – | – | 6/12 |
| Catches/stumpings | 0/– | 0/– | 0/– | 42/– |
- Source: CricketArchive, 15 February 2022

Nonkhululeko Peaceful Thabethe (born 1 September 1992) is a South African cricketer who plays as a right-handed batter and right-arm medium bowler. She has appeared in one Test match, one One Day International and one Twenty20 International for South Africa, all against India in 2014. She earned her first cap in all three formats of international cricket in the space of fourteen days. She plays domestic cricket for Central Gauteng.
