= Elizabeth Akehurst =

South African cricketer (born 1975)

Personal information
- Full name: Elizabeth Akehurst
- Born: 24 June 1975 (age 51); South Africa
- Role: All-rounder

International information
- National side: South Africa (1997–1999)
- ODI debut (cap 16): 10 December 1997 v England
- Last ODI: 15 February 1999 v New Zealand

Career statistics
Competition	WODI	WLA
Matches	8	9
Runs scored	109	110
Batting average	15.57	15.71
100s/50s	0/0	0/0
Top score	35*	35*
Balls bowled	168	222
Wickets	1	3
Bowling average	84.00	39.66
5 wickets in innings	0	0
10 wickets in match	0	0
Best bowling	1/24	2/35
Catches/stumpings	2/–	3/–
- Source: CricketArchive, 6 March 2022

Elizabeth Akehurst (born 24 June 1975) is a South African former cricketer who played as an all-rounder. She appeared in eight One Day Internationals for South Africa between 1997 and 1999.
