= Annelie Minny =

South African cricketer (born 1986)

Personal information
- Full name: Annelie Minny
- Born: 15 November 1986 (age 39); Kimberley, South Africa
- Batting: Right-handed
- Bowling: Right-arm off break
- Role: All-rounder; occasional wicket-keeper

International information
- National side: South Africa (2007–2008)
- ODI debut (cap 48): 20 January 2007 v Pakistan
- Last ODI: 14 August 2008 v England
- T20I debut (cap 12): 10 August 2007 v England
- Last T20I: 23 August 2008 v England

Domestic team information
- Years: Team
- 2003/04–2010/11: Free State
- 2011/12: Griqualand West
- 2012/13–2015/16: Free State

Career statistics
Competition	WODI	WT20I	WLA	WT20
Matches	14	5	119	26
Runs scored	227	52	3,173	418
Batting average	20.63	13.00	32.71	18.17
100s/50s	0/2	0/0	4/17	1/0
Top score	73	12	186*	115*
Balls bowled	–	–	2,533	42
Wickets	–	–	59	4
Bowling average	–	–	31.18	9.25
5 wickets in innings	–	–	1	0
10 wickets in match	–	–	0	0
Best bowling	–	–	5/25	3/15
Catches/stumpings	2/–	3/0	46/4	3/1
- Source: CricketArchive, 23 February 2022

Annelie Minny (born 15 November 1986) is a South African former cricketer who played as a right-handed batter, right-arm off break bowler and occasional wicket-keeper. She appeared in 14 One Day Internationals and five Twenty20 Internationals for South Africa in 2007 and 2008. She played domestic cricket for Free State and Griqualand West.
