= Tamara Reeves =

South African cricketer (born 1982)

Personal information
- Full name: Tamara Reeves
- Born: 17 April 1982 (age 44); Edenvale, Transvaal, South Africa
- Batting: Right-handed
- Bowling: Right-arm medium
- Role: Wicket-keeper

International information
- National side: South Africa (2002–2005)
- ODI debut (cap 33): 16 March 2002 v India
- Last ODI: 24 March 2005 v West Indies

Domestic team information
- Years: Team
- 2003/04–2006/07: Gauteng

Career statistics
Competition	WODI	WLA
Matches	4	33
Runs scored	20	707
Batting average	5.00	28.28
100s/50s	0/0	1/3
Top score	14	101*
Balls bowled	–	164
Wickets	–	4
Bowling average	–	30.50
5 wickets in innings	–	0
10 wickets in match	–	0
Best bowling	–	3/20
Catches/stumpings	2/0	18/4
- Source: CricketArchive, 21 February 2022

Tamara Reeves (born 17 April 1982) is a South African former cricketer who played as a wicket-keeper and right-handed batter. She appeared in four One Day Internationals for South Africa between 2002 and 2005. She played domestic cricket for Gauteng, as well as appearing in one tour match for Northerns.
