= Madelein Lotter =

South African cricketer (born 1971)

Personal information
- Full name: Madelein Lotter
- Born: 22 November 1971 (age 54); Somerset West, Cape Province, South Africa
- Batting: Right-handed
- Role: Batter

International information
- National side: South Africa (2002)
- Only Test (cap 31): 19 March 2002 v India
- Only ODI (cap 32): 16 March 2002 v India

Domestic team information
- Years: Team
- 2003/04–2005/06: Boland

Career statistics
Competition	WTest	WODI	WLA
Matches	1	1	24
Runs scored	10	0	260
Batting average	5.00	0.00	16.25
100s/50s	0/0	0/0	0/1
Top score	10	0	59
Balls bowled	–	–	192
Wickets	–	–	1
Bowling average	–	–	134.00
5 wickets in innings	–	–	0
10 wickets in match	–	–	0
Best bowling	–	–	1/34
Catches/stumpings	0/–	0/–	6/–
- Source: CricketArchive, 19 February 2022

Madelein Lotter (born 22 November 1971) is a South African former cricketer who played as a right-handed batter. She appeared in one Test match and one One Day International for South Africa between in 2002, both against India. She played domestic cricket for Boland.
