= Debbie Carr =

South African cricketer (born 1977)

Personal information
- Full name: Debbie Carr
- Born: 23 August 1977 (age 49); South Africa
- Bowling: Right-arm fast
- Role: Bowler

International information
- National side: South Africa (1999)
- ODI debut (cap 22): 7 February 1999 v Australia
- Last ODI: 17 February 1999 v New Zealand

Career statistics
Competition	WODI	WLA
Matches	2	4
Runs scored	3	9
Batting average	3.00	3.00
100s/50s	0/0	0/0
Top score	3	5
Balls bowled	60	144
Wickets	0	2
Bowling average	–	54.50
5 wickets in innings	0	0
10 wickets in match	0	0
Best bowling	–	2/40
Catches/stumpings	0/–	1/–
- Source: CricketArchive, 6 March 2022

Debbie Carr (born 23 August 1977) is a South African former cricketer who played as a right-arm pace bowler. She appeared in two One Day Internationals for South Africa in 1999.
