= Anne Stears =

South African cricketer

Personal information
- Full name: Anne Stears
- Role: Batter

International information
- National side: South Africa (1997)
- ODI debut (cap 18): 16 December 1997 v Pakistan
- Last ODI: 18 December 1997 v Denmark

Career statistics
Competition	WODI
Matches	2
Runs scored	5
Batting average	–
100s/50s	0/0
Top score	5*
Catches/stumpings	0/–
- Source: CricketArchive, 6 March 2022

Anne Stears is a South African former cricketer who played as a batter. She appeared in two One Day Internationals for South Africa, both at the 1997 World Cup.
