= South Africa women's cricket team in India in 2014–15 =

International cricket tour

South Africa women tour of India
	India women	South Africa women
- Dates: 16 November – 30 November 2014
Captains	Mithali Raj	Mignon du Preez

Test series
- Result: India women won the 1-match series 1–0
Most runs	Thirush Kamini (192)	Mignon du Preez (119)
Most wickets	Harmanpreet Kaur (9)	Sunette Loubser (3)

One Day International series
- Results: South Africa women won the 3-match series 2–1
Most runs	Shikha Pandey (118)	Chloe Tryon (99)
Most wickets	Jhulan Goswami (6)	Dane van Niekerk (6); Marizanne Kapp (6)

Twenty20 International series
- Results: India women won the 1-match series 1–0
Most runs	Smriti Mandhana (52)	Dane van Niekerk (46)
Most wickets	Poonam Yadav (3)	Sunette Loubser (2)

The South Africa women's cricket team toured India from 16 to 30 November 2014. The tour consisted of one Test match, three One Day International (ODI) matches and one Twenty20 International (T20I). The ODI games were part of the 2014–16 ICC Women's Championship. South Africa beat India 2–1 in the ODI series. India won the only Test match.

== Squads ==
Tests		ODIs		T20I	
India	South Africa	India	South Africa	India	South Africa
Mithali Raj (c); Ekta Bisht; Rajeshwari Gayakwad; Jhulan Goswami; Thirush Kamini; Harmanpreet Kaur; Smriti Mandhana; Niranjana Nagarajan; Shikha Pandey; Poonam Yadav; Swagatika Rath; Poonam Raut; Shubhlakshmi Sharma; Vellaswamy Vanitha; Sushma Verma (wk)	Mignon du Preez (c); Trisha Chetty (vc); Savanna Cordes; Moseline Daniels; Yolani Fourie; Shabnim Ismail; Marizanne Kapp; Ayabonga Khaka; Lizelle Lee; Marcia Letsoalo; Nadine Moodley; Nonkhululeko Thabethe; Chloe Tryon; Dane van Niekerk	Mithali Raj (c); Ekta Bisht; Rajeshwari Gayakwad; Jhulan Goswami; Thirush Kamini; Harmanpreet Kaur; Smriti Mandhana; Poonam Yadav; Sneh Rana; Swagatika Rath; Poonam Raut; Deepti Sharma; Shubhlakshmi Sharma; Vellaswamy Vanitha; Sushma Verma (wk)	Mignon du Preez (c); Trisha Chetty (vc); Savanna Cordes; Moseline Daniels; Yolani Fourie; Shabnim Ismail; Marizanne Kapp; Ayabonga Khaka; Lizelle Lee; Marcia Letsoalo; Nadine Moodley; Nonkhululeko Thabethe; Chloe Tryon; Dane van Niekerk	Mithali Raj (c); Ekta Bisht; Rajeshwari Gayakwad; Jhulan Goswami; Harmanpreet Kaur; Smriti Mandhana; Shikha Pandey; Poonam Yadav; Sneh Rana; Poonam Raut; Paramita Roy; Shubhlakshmi Sharma; Devika Vaidya; Vellaswamy Vanitha; Sushma Verma (wk)	Mignon du Preez (c); Trisha Chetty (vc); Savanna Cordes; Moseline Daniels; Yolani Fourie; Shabnim Ismail; Marizanne Kapp; Ayabonga Khaka; Lizelle Lee; Marcia Letsoalo; Nadine Moodley; Nonkhululeko Thabethe; Chloe Tryon; Dane van Niekerk

== Tour matches ==
=== Practice match: India A Women v South Africa Women ===
12 – 13 November 2014
Scorecard

India A	v	South Africa

Cancelled
KSCA Cricket Ground, Alur

- No toss.
- Delay in the arrival of South Africa meant the match was cancelled.

=== ODI practice match: India A Women v South Africa Women ===
22 November 2014 (D/N)
Scorecard

South Africa; 300/7 (50 overs)	v	India A 180/3 (50 overs)
Lizelle Lee 128 (141); Devika Vaidya 3/59 (10 overs)		Smriti Mandhana 54 (79); Sunette Loubser 1/22 (10 overs)

South Africa Women won by 120 runs
M. Chinnaswamy Stadium, Bangalore
Umpires: Abhijit Bengeri (Ind) and K.R. Vasuki (Ind)

- India A Women won the toss and elected to field.

== Test series ==
=== Only Test ===
16 – 19 November 2014
Scorecard

India	v	South Africa
400/6d (148.4 overs); Thirush Kamini 192 (430); Sunette Loubser 3/90 (32.4 overs)		234 (110 overs); Mignon du Preez 102 (253); Harmanpreet Kaur 5/44 (16 overs)
		132 f/o (78.4 overs); Trisha Chetty 35 (131); Harmanpreet Kaur 4/41 (25.2 overs)

India Women won by an innings and 34 runs
Gangothri Glades Cricket Ground, Mysore
Umpires: Nitin Pandit (Ind) and Rohan Pandit (Ind)

- India Women won the toss and elected to bat.
- Rajeshwari Gayakwad, Poonam Yadav, Sushma Verma (Ind); Mignon du Preez, Yolani Fourie, Marizanne Kapp, Lizelle Lee, Nadine Moodley, Nonkhululeko Thabethe, Chloe Tryon and Dane van Niekerk (SA) made their Test debut.

== ODI series ==
=== 1st ODI ===
ICC Women's Championship
24 November 2014 (D/N)
Scorecard

India; 114 (38.5 overs)	v	South Africa; 118/8 (41.1 overs)
Jhulan Goswami 33 (81); Dane van Niekerk 4/9 (7 overs)		Chloe Tryon 50 (80); Jhulan Goswami 3/22 (7 overs)

South Africa Women won by 2 wickets
M. Chinnaswamy Stadium, Bangalore
Umpires: Puttarangaiah Jayapal (Ind) and Belur Ravi (Ind)

- India Women won the toss and elected to bat.
- Sushma Verma (Ind) made her ODI debut.
- ICC Women's Championship points: India Women 0, South Africa Women 2

=== 2nd ODI ===
ICC Women's Championship
26 November 2014 (D/N)
Scorecard

South Africa; 186/8 (50 overs)	v	India; 187/4 (44.4 overs)
Chloe Tryon 49* (34); Shikha Pandey 3/19 (10 overs)		Shikha Pandey 59 (56); Sunette Loubser 1/17 (5 overs)

India Women won by 6 wickets
M. Chinnaswamy Stadium, Bangalore
Umpires: Puttarangaiah Jayapal (Ind) and Belur Ravi (Ind)

- India Women won the toss and elected to field.
- ICC Women's Championship points: India Women 2, South Africa Women 0

=== 3rd ODI ===
ICC Women's Championship
28 November 2014 (D/N)
Scorecard

India; 180 (47.3 overs)	v	South Africa; 184/6 (48 overs)
Shikha Pandey 59 (59); Sunette Loubser 3/28 (8 overs)		Nadine Moodley 54 (90); Jhulan Goswami 2/27 (10 overs)

South Africa Women won by 4 wickets
M. Chinnaswamy Stadium, Bangalore
Umpires: Puttarangaiah Jayapal (Ind) and Belur Ravi (Ind)

- South Africa Women won the toss and elected to field.
- Deepti Sharma (Ind) and Nonkhululeko Thabethe (SA) made their ODI debuts.
- ICC Women's Championship points: India Women 0, South Africa Women 2

== T20I series ==
=== Only T20I ===
30 November 2014
Scorecard

India; 146/5 (20 overs)	v	South Africa; 130/9 (20 overs)
Smriti Mandhana 52 (42); Sunette Loubser 2/29 (4 overs)		Dane van Niekerk 46 (47); Poonam Yadav 3/18 (3 overs)

India Women won by 16 runs
M. Chinnaswamy Stadium, Bangalore
Umpires: Puttarangaiah Jayapal (Ind) and Belur Ravi (Ind)

- South Africa Women won the toss and elected to field.
- Devika Vaidya (Ind) and Nonkhululeko Thabethe (SA) made their T20I debuts.
