= Claire Cowan (cricketer) =

South African cricketer (born 1981)

Personal information
- Full name: Claire Sheena Cowan
- Born: 18 September 1981 (age 45); Cape Town, South Africa
- Batting: Right-handed
- Role: Wicket-keeper

International information
- National side: South Africa (2003)
- Test debut (cap 37): 7 August 2003 v England
- Last Test: 20 August 2003 v England

Domestic team information
- Years: Team
- 2003/04–2004/05: Western Province

Career statistics
Competition	WTest	WLA
Matches	2	14
Runs scored	54	369
Batting average	13.50	28.38
100s/50s	0/0	0/3
Top score	23	85/
Catches/stumpings	1/–	9/6
- Source: CricketArchive, 28 February 2022

Claire Sheena Cowan (born 18 September 1981) is a South African former cricketer who played as a right-handed batter and wicket-keeper. She appeared in two Test matches for South Africa in 2003, on their tour of England. She played domestic cricket for Western Province.
