= Shafeeqa Pillay =

South African cricketer (born 1985)

Personal information
- Full name: Shafeeqa Pillay
- Born: 11 February 1985 (age 41); Uitenhage, Cape Province, South Africa
- Batting: Left-handed
- Bowling: Right-arm medium
- Role: Wicket-keeper

International information
- National side: South Africa (2004–2005)
- ODI debut (cap 40): 15 February 2004 v England
- Last ODI: 9 April 2005 v West Indies

Domestic team information
- Years: Team
- 2003/04–2006/07: Eastern Province
- 2006/07–2020/21: Border

Career statistics
Competition	WODI	WLA	WT20
Matches	12	141	27
Runs scored	50	2,256	430
Batting average	6.25	20.88	20.47
100s/50s	0/0	1/7	0/1
Top score	11*	101	60
Balls bowled	48	1,777	–
Wickets	1	45	–
Bowling average	16.00	20.20	–
5 wickets in innings	0	1	–
10 wickets in match	0	0	–
Best bowling	1/16	5/9	–
Catches/stumpings	11/2	70/16	10/0
- Source: CricketArchive, 20 February 2022

Shafeeqa Pillay (born 11 February 1985) is a South African former cricketer who played as a right-handed batter and wicket-keeper. She appeared in 12 One Day Internationals for South Africa in 2004 and 2005. She played domestic cricket for Eastern Province and Border.
