= Evne Webber =

South African cricketer (born 1977)

Personal information
- Full name: Evne Webber
- Born: 1 June 1977 (age 49); Port Elizabeth, South Africa
- Batting: Right-handed
- Bowling: Right-arm off break
- Role: All-rounder

International information
- National side: South Africa (1999)
- Only ODI (cap 23): 17 February 1999 v New Zealand

Domestic team information
- Years: Team
- 1998/99–2010/11: Eastern Province

Career statistics
Competition	WODI	WLA
Matches	1	69
Runs scored	6	1,559
Batting average	6.00	26.87
100s/50s	0/0	1/8
Top score	6	110*
Balls bowled	–	1,700
Wickets	–	57
Bowling average	–	14.96
5 wickets in innings	–	0
10 wickets in match	–	0
Best bowling	–	3/4
Catches/stumpings	0/–	26/–
- Source: CricketArchive, 22 February 2022

Evne Webber, alternatively Erné Webber, (born 1 June 1977) is a South African former cricketer who played as a right-handed batter and right-arm off break bowler. She appeared in one One Day International for South Africa in 1999, against New Zealand. She played domestic cricket for Eastern Province.
