= Donna Trow =

New Zealand cricketer and coach

Personal information
- Full name: Donna Marie Trow
- Born: 13 July 1977 (age 49); Napier, New Zealand
- Batting: Right-handed
- Bowling: Right-arm medium
- Role: Bowler

International information
- National side: New Zealand (1999)
- ODI debut (cap 76): 13 February 1999 v South Africa
- Last ODI: 15 February 1999 v South Africa

Domestic team information
- Years: Team
- 1995/96–1998/99: Central Districts
- 1999/00: Northern Districts
- 2000/01–2005/06: Central Districts

Career statistics
Competition	WODI	WFC	WLA
Matches	2	1	88
Runs scored	1	5	287
Batting average	–	2.50	9.25
100s/50s	0/0	0/0	0/0
Top score	1*	3	30*
Balls bowled	72	252	4,538
Wickets	4	1	94
Bowling average	4.50	97.00	23.34
5 wickets in innings	0	0	1
10 wickets in match	0	0	0
Best bowling	3/8	1/9	6/20
Catches/stumpings	1/–	0/–	29/–
- Source: CricketArchive, 11 August 2021

Donna Marie Trow (born 13 September 1977) is a New Zealand former cricketer and cricket coach. She played as a right-arm medium bowler. She appeared in two One Day Internationals for New Zealand in 1999. She played domestic cricket for Central Districts and Northern Districts.

Trow attended the University of Waikato and received a Blues Award for cricket in 1999. She retired from cricket in 2006 and became coach of the Hawke's Bay women's team in 2007.
