= Matthew Street =

South African cricketer (born 1978)

Personal information
- Born: 17 December 1978 (age 47); Johannesburg, South Africa
- Source: ESPNcricinfo, 12 December 2016

Matthew Street (born 17 December 1978) is a South African cricketer. He played nineteen first-class and five List A matches between 1999 and 2004. He was also part of South Africa's squad for the 1998 Under-19 Cricket World Cup.
