= Douglas Gain =

South African cricketer (born 1976)

Cricket information
- Batting: Right-handed
- Bowling: Right arm medium

Career statistics
Competition	First-class	List A
Matches	33	21
Runs scored	1503	559
Batting average	26.36	37.26
100s/50s	1/11	0/4
Top score	100	95*
Balls bowled	48	18
Wickets	0	0
Bowling average	–	–
5 wickets in innings	–	–
10 wickets in match	–	–
Best bowling	–	–
Catches/stumpings	26/–	6/–
- Source: CricketArchive, 5 May 2022

Douglas Robert Gain (born 29 December 1976), is a South African cricketer. He is a right-handed batsman and an occasional right-arm medium pace bowler.

He captained the South Africa Under 19s during their tour of India, against the Indian Under 19s. In the three match series, in which he captained all three matches, he won one, lost one and drew the last one. A batsman with one first-class century and 11 half-centuries to his name, he has played for Boland, Gauteng and Transvaal.
