= ABSA Oval =

Cricket ground in Gqeberha, South Africa

Coordinates: 34.0073°S 25.6826°E

Ground information
- Location: Gqeberha

International information
- Only WODI: 15 January 2004: South Africa v England
- As of 7 September 2020; Source: CricketArchive

ABSA Oval, previously known as University of Port Elizabeth No 1 Oval is a cricket ground in Gqeberha, South Africa. Eastern Province and their 'B' side have played first-class and List A cricket at the ground irregularly since 1982. The ground has also hosted one women's One Day International, between England women and South Africa women in 2004.
