= Philip Hearle =

South African cricketer (born 1978)

Personal information
- Born: 31 May 1978 (age 48); Johannesburg, South Africa
- Source: Cricinfo, 1 December 2020

Philip Hearle (born 31 May 1978) is a South African cricketer. He played in six first-class and ten List A matches from 1996/97 to 1999/00.

== See also ==
- List of Boland representative cricketers
