= Savanna Cordes =

South African cricketer (born 1994)

Personal information
- Full name: Thandile Savanna Cordes
- Born: 21 February 1994 (age 32); Johannesburg, South Africa
- Batting: Right-handed
- Role: Wicketkeeper

International information
- National side: South Africa (2013)
- ODI debut (cap 65): 15 January 2013 v West Indies
- Last ODI: 1 February 2013 v New Zealand
- T20I debut (cap 31): 19 January 2013 v West Indies
- Last T20I: 20 January 2013 v West Indies

Domestic team information
- Years: Team
- 2007/08–2014/15: Gauteng

Career statistics
Competition	WODI	WT20I	WLA	WT20
Matches	2	2	37	12
Runs scored	11	0	1,074	76
Batting average	5.50	0.00	39.77	9.50
100s/50s	0/0	0/0	3/6	0/0
Top score	11	0	158*	32
Balls bowled	–	–	60	–
Wickets	–	–	1	–
Bowling average	–	–	46.00	–
5 wickets in innings	–	–	0	–
10 wickets in match	–	–	0	–
Best bowling	–	–	1/36	–
Catches/stumpings	3/–	0/1	27/8	2/2
- Source: CricketArchive, 20 February 2022

Thandile Savanna Cordes (born 21 February 1994) is a South African former cricketer who played as a wicket-keeper and right-handed batter. She appeared in two One Day Internationals and two Twenty20 Internationals for South Africa in 2013. She played domestic cricket for Gauteng.
