= Alta Kotze =

South African cricketer (born 1971)

Personal information
- Full name: Alta Kotze
- Born: 4 December 1971 (age 54); Johannesburg, South Africa
- Batting: Right-handed
- Bowling: Right-arm fast-medium
- Role: Bowler

International information
- National side: South Africa (1997–1999)
- ODI debut (cap 6): 5 August 1997 v Ireland
- Last ODI: 15 February 1999 v New Zealand

Domestic team information
- Years: Team
- 1996/97–1998/99: Gauteng
- 2002/03–2003/04: Easterns
- 2005/06: Limpopo

Career statistics
Competition	WODI	WLA
Matches	15	27
Runs scored	95	152
Batting average	13.57	11.69
100s/50s	0/0	0/0
Top score	30	34
Balls bowled	623	1,275
Wickets	8	21
Bowling average	49.25	36.47
5 wickets in innings	0	0
10 wickets in match	0	0
Best bowling	2/14	3/18
Catches/stumpings	2/–	7/–
- Source: CricketArchive, 11 February 2022

Alta Kotze (born 4 December 1971) is a South African former cricketer who played primarily as a right-arm fast-medium bowler. She appeared in 15 One Day Internationals for South Africa between 1997 and 1999. She played domestic cricket for Gauteng, Easterns and Limpopo.

Kotze also represented the South African Indoor Women's Cricket team. She is the most successful South African Indoor Captain ever with a 89% winning rate.
