= Leighshe Jacobs =

South African cricketer (born 1985)

Personal information
- Full name: Leighshe Zanell Jacobs
- Born: 6 April 1985 (age 41); Elsie's River, Cape Town South Africa
- Batting: Right-handed
- Bowling: Right-arm leg break
- Role: Bowler

International information
- National side: South Africa (2003)
- Test debut (cap 38): 7 August 2003 v England
- Last Test: 20 August 2003 v England

Domestic team information
- Years: Team
- 2003/04–2016/17: Western Province
- 2004/05–2006/07: Boland
- 2021/22: Boland

Career statistics
Competition	WTest	WLA	WT20
Matches	2	112	15
Runs scored	4	1,096	93
Batting average	4.00	19.22	13.28
100s/50s	0/0	0/2	0/1
Top score	3*	56	50
Balls bowled	276	3,061	142
Wickets	4	125	9
Bowling average	44.50	12.95	11.66
5 wickets in innings	0	3	0
10 wickets in match	0	0	0
Best bowling	2/72	5/6	3/18
Catches/stumpings	0/–	44/–	4/–
- Source: CricketArchive, 14 February 2022

Leighshe Zanell Jacobs (born 6 April 1985) is a South African former cricketer who played primarily as a right-arm leg break bowler. She played two Test matches for South Africa in 2003. She played domestic cricket for Western Province and Boland.
