= Ally Kuylaars =

South African cricketer (born 1971)

Personal information
- Full name: Aluis Kuylaars
- Born: 17 May 1971 (age 55); Cape Town, South Africa
- Batting: Right-handed
- Bowling: Right-arm medium
- Role: Bowler

International information
- National side: South Africa (1997–2000)
- ODI debut (cap 13): 7 August 1997 v Ireland
- Last ODI: 18 December 2000 v Australia

Domestic team information
- Years: Team
- 1996/97–1998/99: Western Province

Career statistics
| Competition | WODI | WFC | WLA |
|---|---|---|---|
| Matches | 23 | 1 | 25 |
| Runs scored | 205 | 49 | 210 |
| Batting average | 17.08 | – | 15.00 |
| 100s/50s | 0/2 | 0/0 | 0/2 |
| Top score | 74* | 49* | 74* |
| Balls bowled | 338 | 102 | 386 |
| Wickets | 10 | 0 | 12 |
| Bowling average | 23.30 | – | 22.83 |
| 5 wickets in innings | 0 | 0 | 0 |
| 10 wickets in match | 0 | 0 | 0 |
| Best bowling | 3/26 | – | 3/26 |
| Catches/stumpings | 6/– | 0/– | 7/– |
- Source: CricketArchive, 2 March 2022

Aluis Kuylaars (born 17 May 1971) is a South African former cricketer who played primarily as a right-arm pace bowler. She appeared in 23 One Day Internationals for South Africa between 1997 and 2000. She played domestic cricket for Western Province.
