= Shandre Fritz =

South African cricketer (born 1985)

Personal information
- Full name: Shandre Alvida Fritz
- Born: 21 July 1985 (age 41); Cape Town, Cape Province, South Africa
- Batting: Right-handed
- Bowling: Right arm medium
- Role: All-rounder

International information
- National side: South Africa (2003–2014)
- ODI debut (cap 34): 13 August 2003 v England
- Last ODI: 17 January 2014 v Pakistan
- ODI shirt no.: 13
- T20I debut (cap 17): 22 August 2008 v England
- Last T20I: 31 March 2014 v New Zealand

Domestic team information
- Years: Team
- 2003/04–2015/16: Western Province
- 2007/08: KwaZulu-Natal

Career statistics
Competition	WODI	WT20I	WLA	WT20
Matches	59	26	178	48
Runs scored	959	384	4,190	965
Batting average	21.31	19.20	34.62	27.57
100s/50s	0/5	1/1	2/28	1/3
Top score	68	116*	101	116*
Balls bowled	742	42	3,733	284
Wickets	22	1	136	15
Bowling average	23.00	60.00	13.85	16.00
5 wickets in innings	0	0	4	0
10 wickets in match	0	0	0	0
Best bowling	4/36	1/12	6/20	3/17
Catches/stumpings	15/–	10/–	59/–	13/–
- Source: CricketArchive, 27 February 2022

Shandre Alvida Fritz (born 21 July 1985) is a South African former cricketer and current match referee. She played as a right-handed batter and right-arm medium bowler. She appeared in 59 One Day Internationals and 26 Twenty20 Internationals for South Africa between 2003 and 2014. She played domestic cricket for Western Province and KwaZulu-Natal.

She was given the captaincy of South Africa in 2007, aged 21, but after an accident at a swimming pool in which she damaged her back, she missed the series against the Netherlands and Pakistan, with Cri-Zelda Brits captaining the side instead.

Fritz became the first South African woman to score a century in a Twenty20 International when she scored 116* against the Netherlands at the 2010 ICC Women's Cricket Challenge.

In August 2019, Cricket South Africa appointed her to their Match Referees Panel for the 2019–20 cricket season. In January 2021, she refereed in her first WODI matches, for all three fixtures between South Africa and Pakistan at the Kingsmead Cricket Ground.

In September 2024, she was named as part of an all-female officiating group for the 2024 ICC Women's T20 World Cup.

She will be an umpire in the 2026 ICC Women's T20 World Cup.
