= Nolu Ndzundzu =

South African cricketer (born 1977)

Personal information
- Full name: Nolubabalo Ndzundzu
- Born: 21 December 1977 (age 48); King William's Town, Cape Province, South Africa
- Batting: Right-handed
- Bowling: Right-arm medium
- Role: Bowler

International information
- National side: South Africa (2000–2005)
- Only Test (cap 42): 20 August 2003 v England
- ODI debut (cap 28): 1 July 2000 v England
- Last ODI: 1 April 2005 v Sri Lanka

Domestic team information
- Years: Team
- 2002/03–2005/06: Border

Career statistics
Competition	WTest	WODI	WLA
Matches	1	16	42
Runs scored	8	14	358
Batting average	8.00	7.00	17.04
100s/50s	0/0	0/0	0/1
Top score	8	5*	52
Balls bowled	36	564	1,607
Wickets	0	8	26
Bowling average	–	38.00	29.96
5 wickets in innings	0	0	0
10 wickets in match	0	0	0
Best bowling	–	2/16	4/13
Catches/stumpings	0/–	3/–	13/–
- Source: CricketArchive, 20 February 2022

Nolubabalo Ndzundzu (born 21 December 1977) is a South African former cricketer who played as a right-arm medium bowler. She appeared in one Test match and 16 One Day Internationals for South Africa between 2000 and 2005. She played domestic cricket for Border.

Ndzundzu was the first black woman to play cricket for South Africa. In July 2021, she told a Social Justice and Nation-Building hearing convened by Cricket South Africa that she had faced humiliation and discrimination during her international career. On tours, other members of the national team had wanted to change rooms if they were roomed with her, and had laughed at her poor command of English.

After Ndzundzu retired as a cricketer, she became a police officer, and, subsequently, the selection convenor for the Border women's cricket team.
