= Lenasia Stadium =

Sports complex in Southern Johannesburg, South Africa

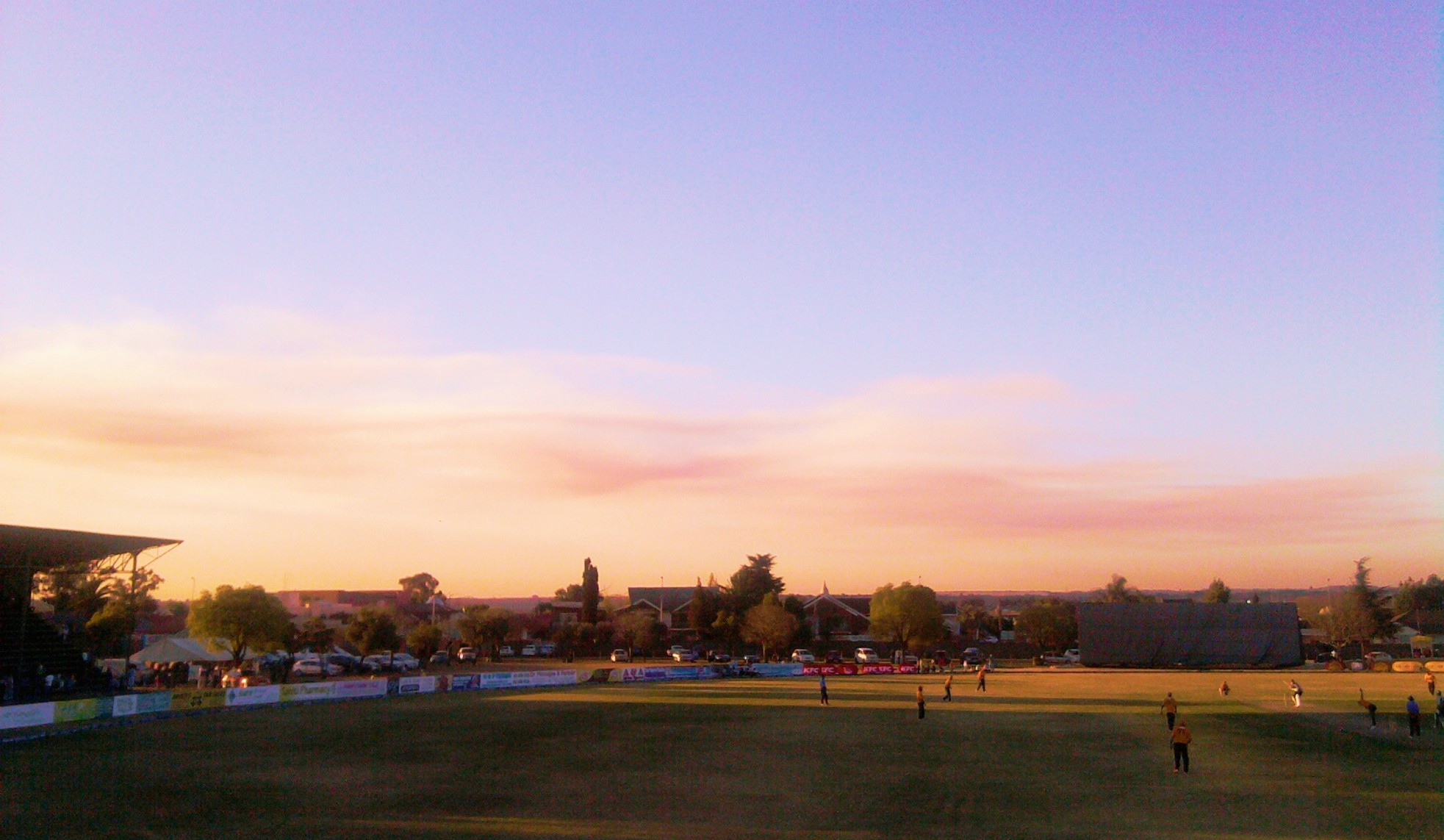

Ground information
- Location: Lenasia, Johannesburg South
- Country: South Africa
- Coordinates: 26.31508°S 27.83108°E
- Home club: Gauteng

International information
- First WODI: 7 March 2002: South Africa v India
- Last WODI: 29 February 2004: South Africa v England
- As of 7 September 2020; Source: CricketArchive

The Lenasia Cricket Stadium (previously known as the Lenz Stadium and MR Varachia Stadium) is a cricket ground in Lenasia, Johannesburg South, South Africa. The ground was used regularly by Transvaal from 1973 until 1991. It has also hosted two women's One Day Internationals, and two youth One Day Internationals.

Abdullatief Barnes scored the first century at the stadium. Rohan Kanhai scored two centuries.

The Howa Bowl (also known as the Dadabhay Trophy) was contested here for the entirety of the tournament from 1972 to 1991.

During Apartheid, the stadium was made for white-only use; two local clubs, the Pirates and Crescents set aside bail money and invaded the field.

In 2003, the Pakistan cricket team played against Gauteng Invitation XI here.
