= Yulandi van der Merwe =

South African cricketer (born 1977)

Personal information
- Full name: Yulandi van der Merwe
- Born: 19 December 1977 (age 48); Pretoria, South Africa
- Batting: Right-handed
- Bowling: Right-arm medium-fast
- Role: All-rounder

International information
- National side: South Africa (2000–2003)
- Test debut (cap 34): 19 March 2002 v India
- Last Test: 20 August 2003 v England
- ODI debut (cap 25): 20 June 2000 v England
- Last ODI: 17 August 2003 v England

Domestic team information
- Years: Team
- 1997/98–2005/06: Northerns
- 2002: Nottinghamshire

Career statistics
| Competition | WTest | WODI | WLA |
|---|---|---|---|
| Matches | 3 | 18 | 44 |
| Runs scored | 79 | 111 | 616 |
| Batting average | 15.80 | 22.20 | 30.80 |
| 100s/50s | 0/1 | 0/0 | 0/3 |
| Top score | 52* | 42* | 88 |
| Balls bowled | 462 | 776 | 1,828 |
| Wickets | 3 | 14 | 31 |
| Bowling average | 76.66 | 41.14 | 36.29 |
| 5 wickets in innings | 0 | 0 | 0 |
| 10 wickets in match | 0 | 0 | 0 |
| Best bowling | 2/81 | 3/25 | 3/25 |
| Catches/stumpings | 1/– | 3/– | 7/– |
- Source: CricketArchive, 28 April 2021

Yulandi van der Merwe (born 19 December 1977) is a South African former cricketer who played as an all-rounder, batting right-handed and bowling right-arm medium-fast. She appeared in 3 Test matches and 18 One Day Internationals for South Africa between 2000 and 2003. She played domestic cricket for Northerns and Nottinghamshire.
