= Josephine Barnard =

South African cricketer (born 1978)

Personal information
- Full name: Josephine Barnard
- Born: 28 December 1978 (age 47); George, Cape Province, South Africa
- Batting: Right-handed
- Bowling: Right-arm off break
- Role: All-rounder

International information
- National side: South Africa (2002–2004)
- Test debut (cap 26): 19 March 2002 v India
- Last Test: 20 August 2003 v England
- ODI debut (cap 30): 7 March 2002 v India
- Last ODI: 1 March 2004 v England

Domestic team information
- Years: Team
- 2003/04–2005/06: Boland

Career statistics
Competition	WTest	WODI	WLA
Matches	3	8	31
Runs scored	93	122	779
Batting average	15.50	15.25	27.82
100s/50s	0/0	0/0	1/2
Top score	31	32	100*
Balls bowled	86	108	800
Wickets	3	2	30
Bowling average	21.66	42.50	13.50
5 wickets in innings	0	0	1
10 wickets in match	0	0	0
Best bowling	2/25	2/33	5/35
Catches/stumpings	1/–	0/–	6/–
- Source: CricketArchive, 19 February 2022

Josephine Barnard (born 28 December 1978) is a South African former cricketer who played as a right-handed batter and right-arm off break bowler. She appeared in three Test matches and eight One Day Internationals for South Africa between 2002 and 2004. She played domestic cricket for Boland.
