= Sune van Zyl =

South African cricketer (born 1977)

Personal information
- Full name: Sune Susanna Deborah van Zyl
- Born: 16 July 1977 (age 49); Welkom, Orange Free State, South Africa
- Role: All-rounder

International information
- National side: South Africa (1999–2004)
- Test debut (cap 35): 19 March 2002 v India
- Last Test: 7 August 2003 v England
- ODI debut (cap 21): 5 February 1999 v Australia
- Last ODI: 1 March 2004 v England

Domestic team information
- Years: Team
- 2002: Lancashire
- 2003/04: Western Province
- 2004/05: Boland

Career statistics
Competition	WTest	WODI	WLA
Matches	2	18	36
Runs scored	58	85	502
Batting average	19.33	10.62	21.82
100s/50s	0/0	0/0	0/2
Top score	37	21	74
Balls bowled	258	654	1,432
Wickets	1	11	36
Bowling average	121.00	40.45	24.11
5 wickets in innings	0	0	2
10 wickets in match	0	0	0
Best bowling	1/63	4/23	5/12
Catches/stumpings	0/–	2/–	6/–
- Source: CricketArchive, 11 April 2021

Sune Susanna Deborah van Zyl (born 16 July 1977) is a South African former cricketer who played as an all-rounder. She appeared in 2 Test matches and 18 One Day Internationals for South Africa between 2002 and 2004. She played domestic cricket for Western Province, Boland and Lancashire.
