= Linda Olivier =

South African cricketer (born 1965)

Personal information
- Full name: Linda Olivier
- Born: 17 April 1965 (age 61); Orange Free State, South Africa
- Batting: Right-handed
- Bowling: Right-arm medium
- Role: Batter

International information
- National side: South Africa (1997–2000)
- ODI debut (cap 8): 5 August 1997 v Ireland
- Last ODI: 18 December 2000 v Australia

Domestic team information
- Years: Team
- 1995/96–1997/98: Gauteng
- 1998/99: Northerns

Career statistics
Competition	WODI	WLA
Matches	28	31
Runs scored	838	871
Batting average	34.91	32.25
100s/50s	1/7	1/7
Top score	101*	101*
Balls bowled	180	180
Wickets	4	4
Bowling average	23.75	23.75
5 wickets in innings	0	0
10 wickets in match	0	0
Best bowling	2/10	2/10
Catches/stumpings	3/–	3/–
- Source: CricketArchive, 21 February 2022

Linda Olivier (born 17 April 1965) is a South African former cricketer who played as a right-handed batter She appeared in 28 One Day Internationals for South Africa between 1997 and 2000. She captained the side on their tours of Australia and New Zealand in 1999. She was the first South African woman to score a century in a One Day International, making 101* against Ireland in December 2000. She played domestic cricket for Gauteng and Northerns.
