= Kim Price =

South African cricketer (born 1962)

Personal information
- Full name: Kim Price
- Born: 9 December 1962 (age 63); Cape Town, South Africa
- Batting: Right-handed
- Bowling: Slow left-arm orthodox
- Role: Bowler

International information
- National side: South Africa (1997–2000)
- ODI debut: 5 August 1997 v Ireland
- Last ODI: 18 December 2000 v Australia

Domestic team information
- Years: Team
- 1982/83–1997/98: Western Province

Career statistics
Competition	WODI	WFC	WLA
Matches	26	1	29
Runs scored	109	17	137
Batting average	9.08	–	9.78
100s/50s	0/0	0/0	0/0
Top score	22	17*	22
Balls bowled	952	138	1,090
Wickets	20	2	25
Bowling average	24.10	19.50	22.08
5 wickets in innings	0	0	0
10 wickets in match	0	0	0
Best bowling	3/14	2/39	3/14
Catches/stumpings	5/–	0/–	5/–
- Source: CricketArchive, 1 March 2022

Kim Price (born 9 December 1962) is a South African former cricketer who played as a slow left-arm orthodox bowler. She appeared in 26 One Day Internationals for South Africa between 1997 and 2000, and captained the side throughout that period. She played domestic cricket for Western Province.
