= Helen Davies (cricketer) =

South African cricketer (born 1966)

Personal information
- Full name: Helen Ann Davies
- Born: 29 July 1966 (age 60); Cape Town, South Africa
- Batting: Right-handed
- Bowling: Right-arm medium
- Role: All-rounder

International information
- National side: South Africa (1997–2000)
- ODI debut (cap 3): 5 August 1997 v Ireland
- Last ODI: 11 December 2000 v New Zealand

Domestic team information
- Years: Team
- 1983/84–1998/99: Western Province

Career statistics
Competition	WODI	WFC	WLA
Matches	25	1	30
Runs scored	432	25	596
Batting average	18.78	25.00	21.28
100s/50s	0/1	0/0	0/2
Top score	64	25	64
Balls bowled	646	60	806
Wickets	15	1	19
Bowling average	28.66	26.00	30.05
5 wickets in innings	0	0	0
10 wickets in match	0	0	0
Best bowling	4/23	1/26	4/23
Catches/stumpings	2/–	0/–	4/–
- Source: CricketArchive, 2 March 2022

Helen Ann Davies (born 29 July 1966) is a South African former cricketer who played as a right-handed batter and right-arm medium bowler. She appeared in 25 One Day Internationals for South Africa between 1997 and 2000. She played domestic cricket for Western Province.
