= Kerri Laing =

South African cricketer (born 1968)

Personal information
- Full name: Kerri Ann Laing
- Born: 17 October 1968 (age 58); Durban, South Africa
- Batting: Right-handed
- Bowling: Right-arm off break
- Role: All-rounder

International information
- National side: South Africa (1997–2002)
- Only Test (cap 30): 19 March 2002 v India
- ODI debut (cap 7): 5 August 1997 v Ireland
- Last ODI: 13 March 2002 v India

Domestic team information
- Years: Team
- 1996/97–2005/06: Gauteng

Career statistics
Competition	WTest	WODI	WFC	WLA
Matches	1	23	2	40
Runs scored	16	385	88	833
Batting average	8.00	21.38	29.33	26.24
100s/50s	0/0	0/3	0/1	0/6
Top score	9	91*	72	91*
Balls bowled	144	378	258	1,034
Wickets	1	8	1	26
Bowling average	72.00	25.87	133.00	19.15
5 wickets in innings	0	0	0	0
10 wickets in match	0	0	0	0
Best bowling	1/72	3/4	1/72	3/4
Catches/stumpings	1/–	9/–	2/–	14/–
- Source: CricketArchive, 21 February 2022

Kerri Ann Laing (born 17 October 1968) is a South African former cricketer who played as a right-handed batter and right-arm off break bowler. She appeared in one Test match and 23 One Day Internationals for South Africa between 1997 and 2002. She played domestic cricket for Gauteng.
