= Denise Reid =

South African cricketer (born 1967)

Personal information
- Full name: Denise Joanne Reid
- Born: 15 June 1967 (age 59); Stellenbosch, Cape Province, South Africa
- Batting: Left-handed
- Bowling: Right-arm fast-medium
- Role: All-rounder

International information
- National side: South Africa (1997–2002)
- Only Test (cap 32): 19 March 2002 v India
- ODI debut (cap 14): 7 August 1997 v Ireland
- Last ODI: 16 March 2002 v India

Domestic team information
- Years: Team
- 1997/98–1998/99: Western Province
- 2003/04: Boland

Career statistics
Competition	WTest	WODI	WFC	WLA
Matches	1	29	2	44
Runs scored	50	275	66	543
Batting average	50.00	13.75	33.00	18.10
100s/50s	0/0	0/1	0/0	0/2
Top score	36	56	36	67
Balls bowled	36	408	90	474
Wickets	0	12	0	13
Bowling average	–	24.08	–	25.61
5 wickets in innings	0	0	0	0
10 wickets in match	0	0	0	0
Best bowling	–	3/7	–	3/7
Catches/stumpings	1/–	2/–	1/–	8/–
- Source: CricketArchive, 19 February 2022

Denise Joanne Reid (born 15 June 1967) is a South African former cricketer who played as a left-handed batter and right-arm fast-medium. She appeared in one Test match and 29 One Day Internationals for South Africa between 1997 and 2002. She played domestic cricket for Western Province and Boland.
