= Cindy Eksteen =

South African cricketer (born 1977)

Personal information
- Full name: Cindy Elizabeth Eksteen
- Born: 21 November 1977 (age 48); Vryheid, Natal, South Africa
- Batting: Right-handed
- Bowling: Right-arm fast-medium
- Role: All-rounder; occasional wicket-keeper

International information
- National side: South Africa (1997–2004)
- Only Test (cap 28): 19 March 2002 v India
- ODI debut (cap 4): 5 August 1997 v Ireland
- Last ODI: 29 February 2004 v England

Domestic team information
- Years: Team
- 1996/97–1997/98: Free State
- 1998/99: North West
- 2002/03: Northerns
- 2003/04: Easterns

Career statistics
Competition	WTest	WODI	WFC	WLA
Matches	1	36	2	44
Runs scored	42	435	51	623
Batting average	21.00	16.11	17.00	18.87
100s/50s	0/0	0/1	0/0	0/2
Top score	25	62	25	65
Balls bowled	228	1486	228	1,918
Wickets	2	28	2	34
Bowling average	32.00	30.82	32.00	33.00
5 wickets in innings	0	0	0	0
10 wickets in match	0	0	0	0
Best bowling	2/64	4/4	2/61	4/4
Catches/stumpings	1/–	7/–	1/0	7/–
- Source: CricketArchive, 22 February 2022

Cindy Elizabeth Eksteen (born 21 November 1977) is a South African former cricketer who played as a right-handed batter and right-arm fast-medium bowler. She appeared in one Test match and 36 One Day Internationals for South Africa between 1997 and 2004, including captaining the side in 1999 and 2002. She played domestic cricket for Free State, North West, Northerns and Easterns.
