= 2020–21 Women's T20 Super League =

- Dates: 14 – 16 December 2020
- Administrator: Cricket South Africa
- Cricket format: Twenty20
- Tournament format: Round-robin
- Champions: Coronations (2nd title)
- Participants: 4
- Matches: 6
- Most runs: Suné Luus (150)
- Most wickets: Nobulumko Baneti (7)

The 2020–21 Women's T20 Super League was the third Women's T20 Super League competition that took place in South Africa. It took place in December 2020, with 4 teams taking part made up of the best players in South Africa. Coronations won the competition, winning their second title.

== Competition format ==
The four teams played each other once in a round-robin, therefore playing three matches. Matches were played using a Twenty20 format.

The league worked on a points system with positions being based on the total points. Points were awarded as follows:

Win: 2 points.
Tie: 1 point.
Loss: 0 points.
Abandoned/No Result: 1 point.

== Squads ==
A Virtual Draft took place on 3 December 2020, including players from the South Africa squad, South Africa Under-19s squad and top players from domestic provincial sides.

Coronations Coach: Adele van Eck	Duchesses Coach: Martelize van der Merwe	Starlights Coach: Claire Terblanche	Thistles Coach: Angelique Taai
Nadine de Klerk (Captain); Tazmin Brits; Izelle Cilliers; Ayabonga Khaka; Zintle Kula; Madison Landsman; Nonkululeko Mlaba; Raisibe Ntozakhe; Kgomotso Rapoo; Verunissa Reddy; Kirstie Thomson; Jane Winster; Laura Wolvaardt	Suné Luus (Captain); Kelsey Adams; Michaela Andrews; Mignon du Preez; Alyssa Elxlebben; Gandhi Jafta; Sinalo Jafta; Michaela Kirk; Monalisa Legodi; Zintle Mali; Paulinah Mashishi; Gabsile Nkosi; Robyn Searle; Delmi Tucker; Faye Tunnicliffe	Chloe Tryon (Captain); Nicole de Klerk; Anneria Dercksen; Lara Goodall; Anri Grobbelaar; Leah Jones; Masabata Klaas; Lizelle Lee; Tatum le Roux; Khushi Mistry; Nondumiso Shangase; Andrie Steyn; Christine Tomlinson; Evodia Yekile	Tumi Sekhukhune (Captain); Nobulumko Baneti; Anneke Bosch; Alexandra Candler; Trisha Chetty; Moseline Daniels; Jade de Figueiredo; Courtney Gouden; Shabnim Ismail; Eliz-Mari Marx; Khayakazi Mathe; Nadia Mbokotwana; Nonkhululeko Thabethe

== Points table ==
Team	Pld	W	L	T	NR	A	Pts	NRR
Coronations (C)	3	2	1	0	0	0	4	1.050
Thistles	3	2	1	0	0	0	4	–0.200
Starlights	3	1	2	0	0	0	2	–0.167
Duchesses	3	1	2	0	0	0	2	–0.683

Source: CricketArchive

== Fixtures ==
14 December 2020
Scorecard

Thistles; 100/6 (20 overs)	v	Starlights; 89/9 (20 overs)
Anneke Bosch 52 (45); Masabata Klaas 3/15 (4 overs)		Khushi Mistry 34* (44); Khayakazi Mathe 3/16 (4 overs)

Thistles won by 11 runs
Newlands Cricket Ground, Cape Town

- Thistles won the toss and elected to bat.

14 December 2020
Scorecard

Coronations; 132/4 (20 overs)	v	Duchesses; 126/6 (20 overs)
Laura Wolvaardt 61 (57); Suné Luus 2/23 (4 overs)		Suné Luus 53 (50); Ayabonga Khaka 2/20 (4 overs)

Coronations won by 6 runs
Newlands Cricket Ground, Cape Town

- Toss not known.

15 December 2020
Scorecard

Starlights; 132/4 (20 overs)	v	Coronations; 130/6 (20 overs)
Annerie Dercksen 66 (62); Ayabonga Khaka 2/15 (4 overs)		Kirstie Thomson 53 (50); Masabata Klaas 3/25 (4 overs)

Starlights won by 2 runs
Newlands Cricket Ground, Cape Town

- Coronations won the toss and elected to field.

15 December 2020
Scorecard

Thistles; 148/4 (20 overs)	v	Duchesses; 112 (18.3 overs)
Trisha Chetty 45 (37); Paulinah Mashishi 1/12 (3 overs)		Suné Luus 42 (37); Nobulumko Baneti 4/18 (3 overs)

Thistles won by 36 runs
Newlands Cricket Ground, Cape Town

- Thistles won the toss and elected to bat.

16 December 2020
Scorecard

Duchesses; 150/3 (20 overs)	v	Starlights; 149/4 (20 overs)
Faye Tunnicliffe 69 (60); Tatum le Roux 2/32 (4 overs)		Lizelle Lee 72 (44); Paulinah Mashishi 2/22 (4 overs)

Duchesses won by 1 run
Newlands Cricket Ground, Cape Town

- Duchesses won the toss and elected to bat.

16 December 2020
Scorecard

Coronations; 103/9 (20 overs)	v	Thistles; 44 (16.4 overs)
Nadine de Klerk 30 (31); Tumi Sekhukhune 3/21 (4 overs)		Trisha Chetty 23 (34); Kgomotso Rapoo 3/2 (2 overs)

Coronations won by 59 runs
Newlands Cricket Ground, Cape Town

- Coronations won the toss and elected to bat.

== Statistics ==
=== Most runs ===
Player	Team	Matches	Innings	Runs	Average	HS	100s	50s
Suné Luus	Duchesses	3	3	150	50.00	55	0	2
Laura Wolvaardt	Coronations	3	3	116	38.66	61	0	1
Faye Tunnicliffe	Duchesses	3	3	97	32.33	69	0	1
Kirstie Thomson	Coronations	2	2	91	45.50	53	0	1
Lizelle Lee	Starlights	3	3	76	25.33	72	0	1

Source: CricketArchive

=== Most wickets ===
Player	Team	Overs	Wickets	Average	BBI	5w
Nobulumko Baneti	Thistles	9.0	7	8.71	4/18	0
Masabata Klaas	Starlights	12.0	6	13.16	3/15	0
Tumi Sekhukhune	Thistles	12.0	5	11.40	3/21	0
Madison Landsman	Coronations	6.0	4	5.25	3/10	0
Ayabonga Khaka	Coronations	9.0	4	10.00	2/15	0

Source: CricketArchive
