= 2019 Women's T20 Super League =

- Dates: 6 – 8 September 2019
- Administrator: Cricket South Africa
- Cricket format: Twenty20
- Tournament format: Round-robin
- Champions: Devnarain XI (1st title)
- Participants: 4
- Matches: 6
- Most runs: Laura Wolvaardt (188)
- Most wickets: Masabata Klaas (6)

The 2019 Women's T20 Super League was the inaugural Women's T20 Super League competition that took place in South Africa. It took place in September 2019, with 4 teams taking part made up of the best players in South Africa. Devnarain XI won the competition by topping the round-robin group.

== Competition format ==
The four teams played each other once in a round-robin, therefore playing three matches. Matches were played using a Twenty20 format.

The league worked on a points system with positions being based on the total points. Points were awarded as follows:

Win: 2 points.
Tie: 1 point.
Loss: 0 points.
Abandoned/No Result: 1 point.

== Squads ==
The 2019 Women's T20 Super League was launched at Tuks Cricket Clubhouse in Tshwane, with teams selected from a pool of 52 players.

Devnarain XI Coach: Dinesha Devnarain	F van der Merwe XI Coach: Francois van der Merwe	M van der Merwe XI Coach: Martelize van der Merwe	Terblanche XI Coach: Claire Terblanche
Mignon du Preez (Captain); Anri Grobbellaar; Shabnim Ismail; Sinalo Jafta; Zintle Kula; Eliz-Mari Marx; Nonkululeko Mlaba; Tshegofatso Rampai; Tumi Sekhukune; Andrie Steyn; Faye Tunnicliffe; Dane van Niekerk; Jane Winster	Tazmin Brits (Captain); Trisha Chetty; Moseline Daniels; Nadine de Klerk; Alyssa Elxlebben; Yolandi Fourie; Gandhi Jafta; Ayabonga Khaka; Khayakazi Mathe; Carmen Nagel; Raisibe Ntozakhe; Robyn Searle	Lizelle Lee (Captain); Michaela Andrews; Nicole de Klerk; Lara Goodall; Izeabella Hester Cilliers; Marizanne Kapp; Michaela Kirk; Suné Luus; Tebogo Macheke; Zintle Mali; Nadia Mbokotwana; Kgomotso Rapoo; Christine Tomlinson; Delmi Tucker; Evodia Yekile	Laura Wolvaardt (Captain); Nobulumko Baneti; Anneke Bosch; Jade de Figuerido; Annemarie Dercksen; Nicolene Janse van Rensburg; Masabata Klaas; Tatum le Roux; Palesa Mapoo; Verunissa Reddy; Nondumiso Shangase; Saarah Smith; Chloe Tryon

== Points table ==
Team	Pld	W	L	T	NR	A	Pts	NRR
Devnarain XI (C)	3	3	0	0	0	0	6	2.836
M van der Merwe XI	3	2	1	0	0	0	4	–0.328
F van der Merwe XI	3	1	2	0	0	0	2	–2.264
Terblanche XI	3	0	3	0	0	0	0	–0.534

Source: CricketArchive

== Fixtures ==
6 September 2019
Scorecard

M van der Merwe XI; 125/1 (13 overs)	v	F van der Merwe XI; 95/9 (13 overs)
Lizelle Lee 92* (54); Nadine de Klerk 1/19 (2 overs)		Tazmin Brits 15 (14); Michaela Andrews 3/3 (3 overs)

M van der Merwe XI won by 30 runs
Irene Villagers Cricket Club Ground, Pretoria

- M van der Merwe XI won the toss and elected to bat.
- Match reduced to 13 overs per side due to rain.

6 September 2019
Scorecard

Terblanche XI; 102/8 (20 overs)	v	Devnarain XI; 104/4 (17.5 overs)
Palesa Mapoo 34* (31); Nonkululeko Mlaba 3/18 (4 overs)		Mignon du Preez 35 (25); Masabata Klaas 2/12 (3 overs)

Devnarain XI won by 6 wickets
Irene Villagers Cricket Club Ground, Pretoria

- Terblanche XI won the toss and elected to bat.

7 September 2019
Scorecard

F van der Merwe XI; 121 (19.5 overs)	v	Terblanche XI; 109/5 (20 overs)
Trisha Chetty 49 (42); Masabata Klaas 3/11 (4 overs)		Laura Wolvaardt 53 (48); Nadine de Klerk 2/13 (4 overs)

F van der Merwe XI won by 12 runs
Irene Villagers Cricket Club Ground, Pretoria

- Terblanche XI won the toss and elected to field.

7 September 2019
Scorecard

M van der Merwe XI; 106/6 (20 overs)	v	Devnarain XI; 107/1 (13.5 overs)
Michaela Kirk 20* (18); Jane Winster 2/16 (4 overs)		Mignon du Preez 46* (28); Michaela Andrews 1/28 (2.5 overs)

Devnarain XI won by 12 runs
Irene Villagers Cricket Club Ground, Pretoria

- Devnarain XI won the toss and elected to field.

8 September 2019
Scorecard

Devnarain XI; 193/1 (20 overs)	v	F van der Merwe XI; 91 (19.1 overs)
Faye Tunnicliffe 106* (62); Alyssa Elxlebben 1/26 (4 overs)		Robyn Searle 34 (19); Eliz-Mari Marx 3/13 (3.1 overs)

Devnarain XI won by 102 runs
Irene Villagers Cricket Club Ground, Pretoria

- F van der Merwe XI won the toss and elected to field.

8 September 2019
Scorecard

Terblanche XI; 173/6 (20 overs)	v	M van der Merwe XI; 176/4 (20 overs)
Laura Wolvaardt 110 (54); Kgomotso Rapoo 2/35 (4 overs)		Suné Luus 82* (53); Tatum le Roux 1/24 (3 overs)

M van der Merwe XI won by 6 wickets
Irene Villagers Cricket Club Ground, Pretoria

- M van der Merwe XI won the toss and elected to field.

== Statistics ==
=== Most runs ===
Player	Team	Matches	Innings	Runs	Average	HS	100s	50s
Laura Wolvaardt	Terblanche XI	3	3	188	62.66	110	1	1
Lizelle Lee	M van der Merwe XI	3	3	132	66.00	92*	0	1
Mignon du Preez	Devnarain XI	3	3	125	125.00	46*	0	0
Faye Tunnicliffe	Devnarain XI	3	3	121	60.50	106*	1	0
Suné Luus	M van der Merwe XI	3	3	90	45.00	82*	0	1

Source: CricketArchive

=== Most wickets ===
Player	Team	Overs	Wickets	Average	BBI	5w
Masabata Klaas	Terblanche XI	11.0	6	9.83	3/11	0
Tumi Sekhukhune	Devnarain XI	10.0	5	10.80	2/7	0
Nonkululeko Mlaba	Devnarain XI	12.0	5	12.80	3/18	0
Kgomotso Rapoo	M van der Merwe XI	6.0	4	11.75	2/4	0
Michaela Andrews	Coronations	7.5	4	16.75	3/3	0

Source: CricketArchive
