= 2019–20 Women's T20 Super League =

T20 cricket tournament

- Dates: 14 – 16 December 2019
- Administrator: Cricket South Africa
- Cricket format: Twenty20
- Tournament format: Round-robin
- Champions: Starlights (1st title)
- Participants: 4
- Matches: 6
- Most runs: Dane van Niekerk (146)
- Most wickets: Chloe Tryon (4)

The 2019–20 Women's T20 Super League was the second Women's T20 Super League competition that took place in South Africa. It took place in December 2019, with 4 teams taking part made up of the best players in South Africa. Starlights won the competition by topping the round-robin group.

== Competition format ==
The four teams played each other once in a round-robin, therefore playing three matches. Matches were played using a Twenty20 format.

The league worked on a points system with positions being based on the total points. Points were awarded as follows:

Win: 2 points.
Tie: 1 point.
Loss: 0 points.
Abandoned/No Result: 1 point.

== Squads ==
The 2019–20 Women's T20 Super League took place two months after the inaugural tournament, with renamed teams.

Coronations Coach: Dinesha Devnarain	Duchesses Coach: Martelize van der Merwe	Starlights Coach: Claire Terblanche	Thistles Coach: Francois van der Merwe
Dane van Niekerk (Captain); Mignon du Preez; Courtney Gounden; Anri Grobbellaar; Shabnim Ismail; Zintle Kula; Eliz-Mari Marx; Nonkululeko Mlaba; Tshegofatso Rampai; Tumi Sekhukune; Andrie Steyn; Faye Tunnicliffe; Jane Winster	Suné Luus (Captain); Michaela Andrews; Nicole de Klerk; Lara Goodall; Izeabella Hester Cilliers; Lizelle Lee; Zintle Mali; Nadia Mbokotwana; Kgomotso Rapoo; Nkululeko Thabaethe; Christine Tomlinson; Delmi Tucker	Laura Wolvaardt (Captain); Nobulumko Baneti; Anneke Bosch; Jade de Figuerido; Annemarie Dercksen; Nicolene Janse van Rensburg; Masabata Klaas; Tatum le Roux; Tebogo Macheke; Palesa Mapoo; Nondumiso Shangase; Saarah Smith; Chloe Tryon	Nadine de Klerk (Captain); Tazmin Brits; Trisha Chetty; Alyssa Elxlebben; Yolandi Fourie; Gandhi Jafta; Leah Jones; Ayabonga Khaka; Khayakazi Mathe; Carmen Nagel; Dheyanka Naidoo; Robyn Searle

== Points table ==
Team	Pld	W	L	T	NR	A	Pts	NRR
Starlights (C)	3	2	1	0	0	0	4	1.004
Coronations	3	2	1	0	0	0	4	0.554
Duchesses	3	2	1	0	0	0	4	–0.554
Thistles	3	0	3	0	0	0	0	–1.012

Source: CricketArchive

== Fixtures ==
14 December 2019
Scorecard

Coronations; 76/3 (12 overs)	v	Starlights; 71/4 (12 overs)
Faye Tunnicliffe 29 (19); Jade de Figueiredo 1/12 (2 overs)		Chloe Tryon 24* (15); Tumi Sekhukhune 2/6 (2 overs)

Coronations won by 5 runs
Newlands Cricket Ground, Cape Town
Umpires: Wendy de Kock and K Klaaste

- Coronations won the toss and elected to bat.
- Match reduced to 12 overs per side due to rain.

14 December 2019
Scorecard

Thistles; 141/6 (20 overs)	v	Duchesses; 84/1 (12.1 overs)
Robyn Searle 54 (43); Suné Luus 2/24 (4 overs)		Suné Luus 49* (30); Yolandi Fourie 1/20 (4 overs)

Duchesses won by 5 runs (DLS)
Newlands Cricket Ground, Cape Town
Umpires: Shiree Steyn and Madri van Staden

- Duchesses won the toss and elected to field.
- Duchesses innings curtailed at 12.1 overs due to rain.
- When play was halted Duchesses needed to have scored 80 runs to win.

15 December 2019
Scorecard

Coronations; 111/6 (20 overs)	v	Duchesses; 113/4 (18.5 overs)
Dane van Niekerk 51 (57); Michaela Andrews 2/22 (4 overs)		Lizelle Lee 46 (40); Shabnim Ismail 2/8 (4 overs)

Duchesses won by 6 wickets
Newlands Cricket Ground, Cape Town
Umpires: Wendy de Kock and Madri van Staden

- Duchesses won the toss and elected to field.

15 December 2019
Scorecard

Thistles; 113/7 (20 overs)	v	Starlights; 117/5 (18.3 overs)
Carmen Nagel 42* (36); Tatum le Roux 2/25 (4 overs)		Anneke Bosch 39 (40); Alyssa Elxlebben 2/19 (3 overs)

Starlights won by 5 wickets
Newlands Cricket Ground, Cape Town
Umpires: K Klaaste and Shiree Steyn

- Starlights won the toss and elected to field.

16 December 2019
Scorecard

Starlights; 156/1 (20 overs)	v	Duchesses; 113/8 (20 overs)
Anneke Bosch 81* (57)		Lizelle Lee 33 (25); Chloe Tryon 4/21 (4 overs)

Starlights won by 43 runs
Newlands Cricket Ground, Cape Town
Umpires: K Klaaste and Madri van Staden

- Duchesses won the toss and elected to field.

16 December 2019
Scorecard

Coronations; 163/2 (20 overs)	v	Thistles; 130/8 (20 overs)
Dane van Niekerk 87* (69); Khayakazi Mathe 1/10 (1 over)		Nadine de Klerk 30 (29); Zintle Kula 2/15 (3 overs)

Coronations won by 33 runs
Newlands Cricket Ground, Cape Town
Umpires: Wendy de Kock and Shiree Steyn

- Thistles won the toss and elected to field.

== Statistics ==
=== Most runs ===
Player	Team	Matches	Innings	Runs	Average	HS	100s	50s
Dane van Niekerk	Coronations	3	3	146	73.00	87*	0	2
Anneke Bosch	Starlights	3	3	122	61.00	81*	0	1
Laura Wolvaardt	Starlights	3	3	116	116.00	61*	0	1
Suné Luus	Duchesses	3	3	114	57.00	49*	0	0
Robyn Searle	Thistles	3	3	82	27.33	54	0	1

Source: CricketArchive

=== Most wickets ===
Player	Team	Overs	Wickets	Average	BBI	5w
Chloe Tryon	Starlights	6.0	4	6.75	4/21	0
Tumi Sekhukhune	Coronations	7.5	3	16.33	2/6	0
Shabnim Ismail	Coronations	10.0	3	17.00	2/8	0
Alyssa Elxlebben	Thistles	7.1	3	17.00	2/19	0
Masabata Klaas	Starlights	10.0	3	17.33	1/15	0

Source: CricketArchive
