= 2022–23 Women's T20 Super League =

Cricket tournament

- Dates: 12 – 16 December 2022
- Administrator: Cricket South Africa
- Cricket format: Twenty20
- Tournament format: Double round-robin
- Champions: None
- Participants: 4
- Matches: 12
- Most runs: Suné Luus (123)
- Most wickets: Nadine de Klerk (6)

The 2022–23 Women's T20 Super League was the fourth edition of the Women's T20 Super League competition, that took place in South Africa. It took place from 12 to 16 December 2022, with 4 teams competing: three composite teams of the best players in South Africa, and the South Africa Under-19 team for the 2023 ICC Under-19 Women's T20 World Cup. With five matches abandoned due to rain, no overall winner was declared for the competition. Starlights topped the group standings, winning all of their completed matches.

== Competition format ==
The four teams played each other twice in a double round-robin, therefore playing six matches. Matches were played using a Twenty20 format. All matches were played at Newlands Cricket Ground in Cape Town.

The league worked on a points system with positions being based on the total points. Points were awarded as follows:

Win: 2 points.
Tie: 1 point.
Loss: 0 points.
Abandoned/No Result: 1 point.

== Squads ==
The squads for Coronations, Starlights and Thistles were announced on 25 November 2022, whilst the South Africa Under-19 squad was announced on 6 December 2022.

Coronations Coach: Martelize van der Merwe	South Africa Under-19s Coach: Dinesha Devnarain	Starlights Coach: Claire Terblanche	Thistles Coach: Yolandi van der Westhuizen
Lara Goodall (c); Nobulumko Baneti; Jane de Figuerido; Nadine de Klerk; Lizri de Villiers; Julia Hoal; Ayabonga Khaka; Lerato Langa; Tabitha le Grange; Suné Luus; Asakhe Nyovane; Saarah Smith; Kirstie Thomson	Oluhle Siyo (c); Jemma Botha; Jenna Evans; Ayanda Hlubi; Elandri Janse van Rensburg; Madison Landsman; Monalisa Legodi; Simone Lourens; Karabo Meso; Refilwe Moncho; Seshnie Naldu; Nthablseng Nini; Diara Ramlakan; Kayla Reyneke; Mlane Smit; Anica Swart; Caitlin Wyngaard	Dane van Niekerk (c); Anneke Bosch; Tazmin Brits; Izel Cilliers; Mieke de Ridder; Gandhi Jafta; Leah Jones; Masabata Klaas; Palesa Mapoo; Khayakazi Mathe; Raisibe Ntozakhe; Delmi Tucker; Jane Winster	Andrie Steyn (c); Micaela Andrews; Annerie Dercksen; Alyssa Erxleben; Tebogo Macheke; Eliz-Mari Marx; Paulinah Mashishi; Nonkululeko Mlaba; Verunissa Reddy; Nondumiso Shangase; Tumi Sekhukhune; Faye Tunnicliffe; Sunette Viljoen

== Points table ==
Team	Pld	W	L	T	NR	A	Pts	NRR
Starlights (Note: Despite finishing top of the table, Starlights were not crowned champions due to the lack of matches completed due to rain.)	6	4	0	0	0	2	10	+1.343
Coronations	6	2	1	0	1	2	7	+0.770
Thistles	6	1	2	0	2	1	5	+0.926
South Africa Under-19s	6	0	4	0	1	1	2	–2.604

== Fixtures ==
12 December 2022
Scorecard

South Africa Under-19s; 82/7 (20 overs)	v	Starlights; 83/1 (13.1 overs)
Karabo Meso 36* (39); Khayakazi Mathe 2/7 (2 overs)		Dane van Niekerk 50* (47); Refilwe Moncho 1/12 (2 overs)

Starlights won by 9 wickets
Newlands Cricket Ground, Cape Town

- Starlights won the toss and elected to field.

12 December 2022
Scorecard

Thistles; 89/8 (20 overs)	v	Coronations; 1/0 (0.3 overs)
Micaela Andrews 19 (31); Ayabonga Khaka 3/15 (4 overs)		Lara Goodall 1* (2)

No Result
Newlands Cricket Ground, Cape Town

- Thistles won the toss and elected to bat.
- No further play was possible due to rain.

12 December 2022
Scorecard

Starlights	v	Thistles

Match Abandoned
Newlands Cricket Ground, Cape Town

- No toss.
- No play was possible due to rain.

13 December 2022
Scorecard

Starlights; 108/8 (20 overs)	v	Coronations; 106/5 (20 overs)
Izel Cilliers 34* (36); Nadine de Klerk 3/23 (4 overs)		Kirstie Thomson 51 (52); Masabata Klaas 1/16 (4 overs)

Starlights won by 2 runs
Newlands Cricket Ground, Cape Town

- Coronations won the toss and elected to field.

13 December 2022
Scorecard

South Africa Under-19s; 46 (15.5 overs)	v	Thistles; 49/0 (6.5 overs)
Anica Swart 13 (16); Nonkululeko Mlaba 3/0 (2 overs)		Sunette Viljoen 31* (29)

Thistles won by 10 wickets
Newlands Cricket Ground, Cape Town

- South Africa Under-19s won the toss and elected to bat.

13 December 2022
Scorecard

Coronations; 112/4 (20 overs)	v	South Africa Under-19s; 78 (20 overs)
Nadine de Klerk 31 (29); Seshnie Naidu 2/14 (4 overs)		Caitlin Wyngaard 22* (28); Tabitha le Grange 3/15 (4 overs)

Coronations won by 34 runs
Newlands Cricket Ground, Cape Town

- South Africa Under-19s won the toss and elected to field.

15 December 2022
Scorecard

Thistles; 106/5 (20 overs)	v	Coronations; 108/3 (17.5 overs)
Sunette Viljoen 28 (33); Kirstie Thomson 1/9 (2 overs)		Suné Luus 57*; Eliz-Mari Marx 2/19 (3.5 overs)

Coronations won by 7 wickets
Newlands Cricket Ground, Cape Town

- Coronations won the toss and elected to field.

15 December 2022
Scorecard

Thistles; 129/9 (20 overs)	v	Starlights; 132/2 (17.5 overs)
Eliz-Mari Marx 56 (42); Khayakazi Mathe 3/20 (4 overs)		Tazmin Brits 49* (47); Eliz-Mari Marx 1/17 (3 overs)

Starlights won by 8 wickets
Newlands Cricket Ground, Cape Town

- Starlighs won the toss and elected to field.

15 December 2022
Scorecard

Starlights; 138/5 (20 overs)	v	South Africa Under-19s; 95/7 (20 overs)
Delmi Tucker 69* (52); Caitlin Wyngaard 2/21 (4 overs)		Karabo Meso 21 (27); Kgomotso Rapoo 3/22 (4 overs)

Starlights won by 43 runs
Newlands Cricket Ground, Cape Town

- South Africa Under-19s won the toss and elected to field.

16 December 2022
Scorecard

Thistles; 155/4 (20 overs)	v	South Africa Under-19s
Sunette Viljoen 66 (48); Seshnie Naidu 2/31 (4 overs)

No Result
Newlands Cricket Ground, Cape Town

- South Africa Under-19s won the toss and elected to field.
- No further play possible due to rain.

16 December 2022

South Africa Under-19s	v	Coronations

Match Abandoned
Newlands Cricket Ground, Cape Town

- No toss.
- No play possible due to rain.

16 December 2022

Coronations	v	Starlights

Match Abandoned
Newlands Cricket Ground, Cape Town

- No toss.
- No play possible due to rain.
