= South Africa women's cricket team in Pakistan in 2023 =

International cricket tour

	Pakistan	South Africa
- Dates: 1 – 14 September 2023
Captains	Nida Dar	Laura Wolvaardt

One Day International series
- Results: South Africa won the 3-match series 2–1
Most runs	Aliya Riaz (121)	Marizanne Kapp (150)
Most wickets	Sadia Iqbal (4); Nashra Sandhu (4)	Nadine de Klerk (8)
- Player of the series: Nadine de Klerk (SA)

Twenty20 International series
- Results: Pakistan won the 3-match series 3–0
Most runs	Sidra Ameen (133)	Laura Wolvaardt (157)
Most wickets	Nashra Sandhu (4); Sadia Iqbal (4)	Nonkululeko Mlaba (3)
- Player of the series: Laura Wolvaardt (SA)

The South Africa women's cricket team toured Pakistan in September 2023 to play three One Day International (ODI) and three Twenty20 International (T20I) matches. The ODI series formed part of the 2022–2025 ICC Women's Championship. In June 2023, Pakistan Cricket Board (PCB) announced the schedule of the tour. It was the South African women's team's first tour of Pakistan.

Pakistan won the T20I series 3–0. It was Pakistan's first ever whitewash of South Africa in the format. South Africa won the ODI series 2–1.

== Squads ==
Pakistan		South Africa
ODIs	T20Is	ODIs and T20Is
Nida Dar (c); Aliya Riaz; Bismah Maroof; Diana Baig; Fatima Sana; Ghulam Fatima; Muneeba Ali (wk); Nashra Sandhu; Omaima Sohail; Sadaf Shamas; Sadia Iqbal; Sidra Ameen; Sidra Nawaz (wk); Umm-e-Hani; Waheeda Akhtar	Nida Dar (c); Aliya Riaz; Bismah Maroof; Diana Baig; Fatima Sana; Muneeba Ali (wk); Najiha Alvi (wk); Nashra Sandhu; Natalia Parvaiz; Sadaf Shamas; Sadia Iqbal; Shawaal Zulfiqar; Sidra Ameen; Syeda Aroob Shah; Umm-e-Hani	Laura Wolvaardt (c); Anneke Bosch; Tazmin Brits; Nadine de Klerk; Mieke de Ridder (wk); Lara Goodall; Sinalo Jafta (wk); Marizanne Kapp; Ayabonga Khaka; Masabata Klaas; Suné Luus; Nonkululeko Mlaba; Tumi Sekhukhune; Nondumiso Shangase; Delmi Tucker

Pakistan named Anoosha Nasir, Omaima Sohail and Waheeda Akhtar as reserves for the T20Is, while Najiha Alvi, Natalia Pervaiz and Tuba Hassan were named as reserves for the ODIs.

Initially, South Africa did not name any captain. However, on 24 August 2023, Laura Wolvaardt was appointed to lead the side for the tour.

== T20I series ==
=== 1st T20I ===
1 September 2023
19:30 (N)
Scorecard

South Africa; 150/3 (20 overs)	v	Pakistan; 151/5 (20 overs)
Tazmin Brits 78 (64); Nashra Sandhu 1/20 (4 overs)		Bismah Maroof 37 (30); Marizanne Kapp 1/24 (4 overs)

Pakistan won by 5 wickets
National Stadium, Karachi
Umpires: Faisal Afridi (Pak) and Rashid Riaz (Pak)
Player of the match: Tazmin Brits (SA)

- Pakistan won the toss and elected to field.
- Shawaal Zulfiqar (Pak) made her T20I debut.
- This was Pakistan's highest successful run chase in T20Is.

=== 2nd T20I ===
3 September 2023
19:30 (N)
Scorecard

South Africa; 150/3 (20 overs)	v	Pakistan; 156/3 (19.1 overs)
Tazmin Brits 46 (48); Sadia Iqbal 1/22 (4 overs)		Sidra Ameen 61 (44); Nonkululeko Mlaba 2/20 (3 overs)

Pakistan won by 7 wickets
National Stadium, Karachi
Umpires: Tariq Rasheed (Pak) and Rashid Riaz (Pak)
Player of the match: Sidra Ameen (Pak)

- Pakistan won the toss and elected to field.
- Umm-e-Hani (Pak) made her T20I debut.

=== 3rd T20I ===
4 September 2023
19:30 (N)
Scorecard

Pakistan; 150/5 (20 overs)	v	South Africa; 144/5 (20 overs)
Bismah Maroof 39 (34); Tumi Sekhukhune 2/24 (4 overs)		Laura Wolvaardt 72 (54); Nashra Sandhu 2/16 (4 overs)

Pakistan won by 6 runs
National Stadium, Karachi
Umpires: Faisal Afridi (Pak) and Tariq Rasheed (Pak)
Player of the match: Laura Wolvaardt (SA)

- South Africa won the toss and elected to field.
- Mieke de Ridder (SA) made her T20I debut.

== ODI series ==
=== 1st ODI ===
8 September 2023
15:30 (D/N)
Scorecard

South Africa; 292/4 (50 overs)	v	Pakistan; 165 (36.5 overs)
Suné Luus 107* (129); Nashra Sandhu 2/50 (10 overs)		Aliya Riaz 49* (58); Nadine de Klerk 3/23 (6 overs)

South Africa won by 127 runs
National Stadium, Karachi
Umpires: Faisal Afridi (Pak) and Rashid Riaz (Pak)
Player of the match: Marizanne Kapp (SA)

- South Africa won the toss and elected to bat.
- Shawaal Zulfiqar (Pak) made her ODI debut.
- Suné Luus (SA) scored her first century in ODIs.
- Women's Championship points: South Africa 2, Pakistan 0.

=== 2nd ODI ===
11 September 2023
15:30 (D/N)
Scorecard

Pakistan; 168 (44.2 overs)	v	South Africa; 169/4 (34 overs)
Fatima Sana 69 (87); Nadine de Klerk 4/32 (8 overs)		Tazmin Brits 45 (54); Sadia Iqbal 2/32 (10 overs)

South Africa won by 6 wickets
National Stadium, Karachi
Umpires: Tariq Rasheed (Pak) and Rashid Riaz (Pak)
Player of the match: Nadine de Klerk (SA)

- Pakistan won the toss and elected to bat.
- Women's Championship points: South Africa 2, Pakistan 0.

=== 3rd ODI ===
14 September 2023
15:30 (D/N)
Scorecard

South Africa; 185 (48.1 overs)	v	Pakistan; 186/2 (38 overs)
Nadine de Klerk 60 (95); Sadia Iqbal 2/26 (10 overs)		Sidra Ameen 68 (82); Ayabonga Khaka 1/27 (8 overs)

Pakistan won by 8 wickets
National Stadium, Karachi
Umpires: Faisal Afridi (Pak) and Tariq Rasheed (Pak)
Player of the match: Sidra Ameen (Pak)

- South Africa won the toss and elected to bat.
- Waheeda Akhtar (Pak) made her ODI debut.
- Women's Championship points: Pakistan 2, South Africa 0.
