= 2022–23 South Africa women's Tri-Nation Series =

Cricket tournament

- Date: 19 January–2 February 2023
- Location: South Africa
- Result: South Africa won the series
- Player of the series: (India) Deepti Sharma
Teams
India	South Africa	West Indies
Captains
Harmanpreet Kaur (Note: Smriti Mandhana captained India in the first match of the tournament.)	Suné Luus	Hayley Matthews
Most runs
Harmanpreet Kaur (109)	Chloe Tryon (86)	Hayley Matthews (125)
Most wickets
Deepti Sharma (9)	Nonkululeko Mlaba (6)	Shamilia Connell (3)

The 2022–23 South Africa women's Tri-Nation Series was a cricket tournament that took place in South Africa in January and February 2023 as a preparatory series before the 2023 ICC Women's T20 World Cup. It was a tri-nation series between India women, South Africa women and the West Indies women cricket teams, with the matches played as Women's Twenty20 International (WT20I) fixtures. In December 2022, Cricket South Africa confirmed the fixtures for the series, with all the matches to be played at Buffalo Park in East London.

The West Indies were eliminated after a 10-wicket defeat to South Africa in their third game of the round-robin stage. Chloe Tryon's unbeaten fifty in the final helped the hosts to claim a 5-wicket victory over India.

== Squads ==
India	South Africa	West Indies
Harmanpreet Kaur (c); Smriti Mandhana (vc); Yastika Bhatia (wk); Harleen Deol; Rajeshwari Gayakwad; Amanjot Kaur; Sabbhineni Meghana; Shikha Pandey; Sneh Rana; Jemimah Rodrigues; Anjali Sarvani; Deepti Sharma; Meghna Singh; Renuka Singh; Devika Vaidya; Pooja Vastrakar; Sushma Verma (wk); Radha Yadav	Suné Luus (c); Chloe Tryon (vc); Anneke Bosch; Tazmin Brits; Nadine de Klerk; Annerie Dercksen; Lara Goodall; Shabnim Ismail; Sinalo Jafta (wk); Marizanne Kapp; Ayabonga Khaka; Masabata Klaas; Tebogo Macheke (wk); Nonkululeko Mlaba; Tumi Sekhukhune; Delmi Tucker; Laura Wolvaardt	Hayley Matthews (c); Aaliyah Alleyne; Shanika Bruce; Shemaine Campbelle; Shamilia Connell; Britney Cooper; ~~Cherry-Ann Fraser~~; Afy Fletcher; Shabika Gajnabi; Jannillea Glasgow; Sheneta Grimmond; Chinelle Henry; Trishan Holder (wk); Zaida James; Djenaba Joseph; Chedean Nation; Karishma Ramharack; Kaysia Schultz; Shakera Selman; Stafanie Taylor; Rashada Williams (wk)

Before the tournament, Cherry-Ann Fraser was ruled out due to injury and was replaced in the squad by Shanika Bruce. The West Indies added Trishan Holder, Zaida James, Djenaba Joseph and Jannillea Glasgow to the squad as injury replacements for their final game of the tournament. All four players had competed in the recently concluded 2023 ICC Under-19 Women's T20 World Cup in South Africa.

== Round-robin ==
=== Points table ===
Pos	Team	Pld	W	L	NR	Pts	NRR
1	India	4	3	0	1	7	2.181
2	South Africa	4	2	1	1	5	1.006
3	West Indies	4	0	4	0	0	−2.435

Source: ESPNcricinfo

Advanced to the final

=== Fixtures ===
Match 1
19 January 2023
19:00 (N)
Scorecard

India; 147/6 (20 overs)	v	South Africa; 120/9 (20 overs)
Amanjot Kaur 41* (30); Nonkululeko Mlaba 2/15 (3 overs)		Suné Luus 29 (30); Deepti Sharma 3/30 (4 overs)

India won by 27 runs
Buffalo Park, East London
Umpires: Lauren Agenbag (SA) and Thomas Mokorosi (SA)
Player of the match: Amanjot Kaur (Ind)

- South Africa won the toss and elected to field.
- Amanjot Kaur (Ind) made her WT20I debut.

Match 2
21 January 2023
15:00
Scorecard

South Africa; 141/5 (20 overs)	v	West Indies; 97/8 (20 overs)
Marizanne Kapp 52 (43); Shamilia Connell 2/17 (3 overs)		Hayley Matthews 23 (35); Masabata Klaas 4/21 (4 overs)

South Africa won by 44 runs
Buffalo Park, East London
Umpires: Ryan Hendricks (SA) and Phillip Vosloo (SA)
Player of the match: Masabata Klaas (SA)

- South Africa won the toss and elected to bat.

Match 3
23 January 2023
19:00 (N)
Scorecard

India; 167/2 (20 overs)	v	West Indies; 111/4 (20 overs)
Smriti Mandhana 74* (51); Karishma Ramharack 1/12 (4 overs)		Shemaine Campbelle 47 (57); Deepti Sharma 2/29 (4 overs)

India won by 56 runs
Buffalo Park, East London
Umpires: Lauren Agenbag (SA) and Phillip Vosloo (SA)
Player of the match: Smriti Mandhana (Ind)

- India won the toss and elected to bat.

Match 4
25 January 2023
15:00
Scorecard

West Indies; 97/6 (20 overs)	v	South Africa; 98/0 (13.4 overs)
Hayley Matthews 34 (26); Tumi Sekhukhune 2/24 (4 overs)		Tazmin Brits 50* (43)

South Africa won by 10 wickets
Buffalo Park, East London
Umpires: Ryan Hendricks (SA) and Thomas Mokorosi (SA)
Player of the match: Tazmin Brits (SA)

- West Indies won the toss and elected to bat.
- Annerie Dercksen (SA) made her WT20I debut.

Match 5
28 January 2023
19:00 (N)
Scorecard

India; 4/0 (2 overs)	v	South Africa
Jemimah Rodrigues 4* (6)

No result
Buffalo Park, East London
Umpires: Lauren Agenbag (SA) and Ryan Hendricks (SA)

- India won the toss and elected to bat.
- No further play was possible due to rain.

Match 6
30 January 2023
15:00
Scorecard

West Indies; 94/6 (20 overs)	v	India; 95/2 (13.5 overs)
Hayley Matthews 34 (34); Deepti Sharma 3/11 (4 overs)		Jemimah Rodrigues 42* (39); Hayley Matthews 1/7 (2 overs)

India won by 8 wickets
Buffalo Park, East London
Umpires: Thomas Mokorosi (SA) and Phillip Vosloo (SA)
Player of the match: Deepti Sharma (Ind)

- India won the toss and elected to field.
- Jannillea Glasgow and Zaida James (WI) both made their WT20I debuts.

== Final ==
2 February 2023
15:00
Scorecard

India; 109/4 (20 overs)	v	South Africa; 113/5 (18 overs)
Harleen Deol 46 (56); Nonkululeko Mlaba 2/16 (4 overs)		Chloe Tryon 57* (32); Sneh Rana 2/21 (4 overs)

South Africa won by 5 wickets
Buffalo Park, East London
Umpires: Lauren Agenbag (SA) and Thomas Mokorosi (SA)
Player of the match: Chloe Tryon (SA)

- India won the toss and elected to bat.
