= South Africa women's cricket team in Ireland in 2022 =

International cricket tour

	Ireland	South Africa
- Dates: 3 – 17 June 2022
Captains	Gaby Lewis	Suné Luus

One Day International series
- Results: South Africa won the 3-match series 3–0
Most runs	Georgina Dempsey (69)	Lara Goodall (143)
Most wickets	Arlene Kelly (2); Georgina Dempsey (2)	Shabnim Ismail (11)
- Player of the series: Shabnim Ismail (SA)

Twenty20 International series
- Results: South Africa won the 3-match series 2–1
Most runs	Gaby Lewis (112)	Anneke Bosch (101)
Most wickets	Arlene Kelly (3)	Tumi Sekhukhune (8)
- Player of the series: Gaby Lewis (Ire)

The South Africa women's cricket team toured Ireland to play against the Ireland women's cricket team in June 2022. The tour consisted of three Women's Twenty20 International (WT20I) and three Women's One Day International (WODI) matches. The WODI matches were the part of 2022–2025 ICC Women's Championship. In May 2022, Cricket South Africa named their squad for the tour, with Suné Luus leading the side in Dane van Niekerk's absence. Likewise, Cricket Ireland named their squad, with Gaby Lewis captaining the side, with Laura Delany out due to an injury. Lewis also became the youngest player to captain the Ireland Women's team in international cricket.

Ireland won the opening WT20I match of the tour by ten runs. It was only Ireland's second win in the format against South Africa, with the first win coming in August 2016. South Africa won the second match by eight wickets to level the series, with Lara Goodall scoring her first half-century in WT20Is. South Africa also won the third WT20I by eight wickets, to win the series 2–1.

In the first WODI match, Ireland were bowled out for just 69 runs. South Africa chased down the target of 70 runs in 16 overs, winning the match by nine wickets. In the next match, Ireland made an improved performance when batting, making 213/8 from their 50 overs. However, South Africa chased the target down with more than eleven overs to spare, winning again by nine wickets, to win the series with a match to play. South Africa won the third and final match by 189 runs, with Shabnim Ismail taking her second five-wicket haul in WODI cricket, winning the series 3–0.

== Squads ==
WODIs		WT20Is	
Ireland	South Africa	Ireland	South Africa
Gaby Lewis (c); Alana Dalzell; Rachel Delaney; Georgina Dempsey; Sarah Forbes; Shauna Kavanagh; Arlene Kelly; Sophie MacMahon; Jane Maguire; Kate McEvoy; Cara Murray; Leah Paul; ~~Celeste Raack~~; Mary Waldron (wk)	Suné Luus (c); Anneke Bosch; Tazmin Brits; Trisha Chetty (wk); Nadine de Klerk; Lara Goodall; Shabnim Ismail; Ayabonga Khaka; Nonkululeko Mlaba; Raisibe Ntozakhe; Tumi Sekhukhune; Andrie Steyn; Chloe Tryon; Delmi Tucker; Laura Wolvaardt	Gaby Lewis (c); Alana Dalzell; Rachel Delaney; Georgina Dempsey; Sarah Forbes; Shauna Kavanagh; Arlene Kelly; Sophie MacMahon; Jane Maguire; Kate McEvoy; Cara Murray; Leah Paul; Celeste Raack; Mary Waldron (wk)	Suné Luus (c); Anneke Bosch; Tazmin Brits; Trisha Chetty (wk); Nadine de Klerk; Lara Goodall; Shabnim Ismail; Ayabonga Khaka; Nonkululeko Mlaba; Raisibe Ntozakhe; Tumi Sekhukhune; Andrie Steyn; Chloe Tryon; Delmi Tucker; Laura Wolvaardt

Ahead of the WODI matches, Ireland's Celeste Raack was granted permission to leave the squad due to family reasons.

== WT20I series ==
=== 1st WT20I ===
3 June 2022
16:30 (D/N)
Scorecard

Ireland; 143/7 (20 overs)	v	South Africa; 133/7 (20 overs)
Gaby Lewis 52 (38); Tumi Sekhukhune 3/32 (4 overs)		Anneke Bosch 29 (36); Arlene Kelly 2/25 (4 overs)

Ireland Women won by 10 runs
Sydney Parade, Dublin
Umpires: Paul Reynolds (Ire) and Aidan Seaver (Ire)
Player of the match: Leah Paul (Ire)

- South Africa Women won the toss and elected to field.
- Arlene Kelly and Jane Maguire (Ire) both made their WT20I debuts.
- Gaby Lewis (Ire) scored her 1,000th run in WT20Is.

=== 2nd WT20I ===
6 June 2022
16:30 (D/N)
Scorecard

Ireland; 106/7 (20 overs)	v	South Africa; 107/2 (15 overs)
Gaby Lewis 31 (29); Tumi Sekhukhune 2/17 (4 overs)		Lara Goodall 52 (40); Arlene Kelly 1/13 (3 overs)

South Africa Women won by 8 wickets
Sydney Parade, Dublin
Umpires: Azam Baig (Ire) and Jareth McCready (Ire)
Player of the match: Shabnim Ismail (SA)

- Ireland Women won the toss and elected to bat.
- Gaby Lewis (Ire) played in her 50th WT20I.
- Shabnim Ismail (SA) played in her 100th WT20I.

=== 3rd WT20I ===
8 June 2022
16:30 (D/N)
Scorecard

Ireland; 104 (18.3 overs)	v	South Africa; 108/2 (13.5 overs)
Shauna Kavanagh 33 (32); Tumi Sekhukhune 3/20 (3.3 overs)		Lara Goodall 48 (32); Jane Maguire 1/6 (1 over)

South Africa Women won by 8 wickets
Sydney Parade, Dublin
Umpires: Azam Baig (Ire) and Roland Black (Ire)
Player of the match: Lara Goodall (SA)

- South Africa Women won the toss and elected to field.
- Sarah Forbes (Ire) made her WT20I debut.

== WODI series ==
=== 1st WODI ===
11 June 2022
10:45
Scorecard

Ireland; 69 (27.2 overs)	v	South Africa; 70/1 (16 overs)
Georgina Dempsey 19* (20); Shabnim Ismail 3/16 (6 overs)		Lara Goodall 32* (40); Georgina Dempsey 1/20 (4 overs)

South Africa Women won by 9 wickets
Clontarf Cricket Club Ground, Dublin
Umpires: Jonathan Kennedy (Ire) and Paul Reynolds (Ire)
Player of the match: Shabnim Ismail (SA)

- Ireland Women won the toss and elected to bat.
- Sarah Forbes, Arlene Kelly (Ire) and Delmi Tucker (SA) all made their WODI debuts.
- Shauna Kavanagh played in her 100th international match for Ireland.
- Women's Championship points: South Africa 2, Ireland 0.

=== 2nd WODI ===
14 June 2022
10:45
Scorecard

Ireland; 213/8 (50 overs)	v	South Africa; 217/1 (38.4 overs)
Gaby Lewis 59 (88); Shabnim Ismail 3/31 (10 overs)		Lara Goodall 93* (99); Georgina Dempsey 1/59 (9.4 overs)

South Africa Women won by 9 wickets
Clontarf Cricket Club Ground, Dublin
Umpires: Mark Hawthorne (Ire) and Jareth McCready (Ire)
Player of the match: Lara Goodall (SA)

- South Africa Women won the toss and elected to field.
- Alana Dalzell (Ire) made her WODI debut.
- Women's Championship points: South Africa 2, Ireland 0.

=== 3rd WODI ===
17 June 2022
10:45
Scorecard

South Africa; 278/5 (50 overs)	v	Ireland; 89 (32.5 overs)
Suné Luus 93 (104); Arlene Kelly 2/40 (10 overs)		Mary Waldron 32 (69); Shabnim Ismail 5/8 (8.5 overs)

South Africa Women won by 189 runs
Clontarf Cricket Club Ground, Dublin
Umpires: Roland Black (Ire) and Aidan Seaver (Ire)
Player of the match: Shabnim Ismail (SA)

- South Africa Women won the toss and elected to bat.
- Shabnim Ismail (SA) took her 300th wicket in international cricket.
- Women's Championship points: South Africa 2, Ireland 0.
