= Thistles (women's cricket) =

South African women's cricket team

Personnel
- Captain: Andrie Steyn
- Coach: Yolandi van der Westhuizen

Team information
- Colours: Light blue
- Founded: 2019

History
- WSL wins: 0

Thistles, previously known as F van der Merwe XI, are a South African women's cricket team that compete in the Women's T20 Super League. The team has no geographical base, instead being made up of some of the best players from across South Africa. They are captained by Andrie Steyn and coached by Yolandi van der Westhuizen. Their best T20 Super League finish came in 2020–21, when they were runners-up.

== History ==
Thistles were first formed in 2019 to compete in the Women's T20 Super League, a tournament designed to provide more competitive cricket to the best players in South Africa. For the first edition of the tournament, the side was named after its coach, Francois van der Merwe, becoming F van der Merwe XI. They were captained by Nadine de Klerk. F van der Merwe XI won one of their three matches in the first tournament, therefore finishing third overall.

For the following edition of the tournament, which took place two months later in December 2019, the side was named Thistles. de Klerk and van der Merwe were retained as captain and coach, respectively. The side lost all three of their matches, finishing bottom of the table.

The third edition of the tournament took place in December 2020. Angelique Taai became coach of the side, and picked Tumi Sekhukhune as captain in the draft that took place prior to the competition, as well as picking fellow South Africa stars Shabnim Ismail and Trisha Chetty. Duchesses won two of their three matches in the tournament, and finished second, just edged out by winners Coronations on Net Run Rate. Thistles bowler Nobulumko Baneti was the leading wicket-taker in the tournament, with 7 wickets including a best of 4/18, taken in the side's 36 run victory over Duchesses.

The tournament returned for its fourth edition in December 2022, with Andrie Steyn becoming the side's captain and Yolandi van der Westhuizen becoming coach. The side finished third in the tournament standings, although with five matches abandoned due to rain, no overall winner was crowned.

== Seasons ==
=== Women's T20 Super League ===
Season	League standings							Notes
Season	P	W	L	T	A/C	Pts	Pos	Notes
2019	3	1	2	0	0	2	3rd	
2019–20	3	0	3	0	0	0	4th	
2020–21	3	2	1	0	0	4	2nd	
2022–23	6	1	2	0	2	5	3rd	

== Honours ==
- Women's T20 Super League:
  - Winners (0):
  - Best finish: Runners-up (2020–21)
