= Ireland Wolves cricket team against Namibia in South Africa in 2019–20 =

International cricket tour

Ireland Wolves cricket team against Namibia in 2019–20
	Namibia	Ireland Wolves
- Dates: 18 – 27 February 2020
Captains	Gerhard Erasmus	Harry Tector

Twenty20 International series
- Results: Ireland Wolves won the 5-match series 4–1
Most runs	Craig Williams (174)	Gareth Delany (189)
Most wickets	Craig Williams (7)	Shane Getkate (7)

LA series
- Result: Namibia won the 2-match series 2–0
Most runs	Niko Davin (116)	Harry Tector (103)
Most wickets	Craig Williams (3); Bernard Scholtz (3)	Joshua Little (2); Shane Getkate (2)

The Ireland Wolves cricket team (Ireland A) toured South Africa to play five unofficial Twenty20 International matches (with Twenty20 status) and two unofficial One Day International matches (with List A status) against the Namibian national team. Ireland Wolves won the T20 series 4–1. The List A series was won 2–0 by Namibia. Ireland Wolves finished their tour with a 50-over friendly match against a Northern Titans Invitation XI.

== Unofficial T20I series ==
=== 1st Unofficial T20I ===
18 February 2020
Scorecard

Ireland Wolves; 177/6 (20 overs)	v	Namibia; 178/7 (19.4 overs)
Harry Tector 75* (39); Ruben Trumpelmann 2/21 (4 overs)		Gerhard Erasmus 63 (35); Craig Young 2/20 (4 overs)

Namibia won by 3 wickets
Centurion Park, Centurion
Umpires: Rudi Birkenstock (SA) and Nicolas Pretorius (SA)

- Namibia won the toss and elected to field.

=== 2nd Unofficial T20I ===
18 February 2020
Scorecard

Ireland Wolves; 170/7 (20 overs)	v	Namibia; 147/9 (20 overs)
Gareth Delany 69 (36); Craig Williams 2/25 (4 overs); Ruben Trumpelmann 2/25 (4 overs)		Gerhard Erasmus 43 (25); Tyrone Kane 2/23 (4 overs)

Ireland Wolves won by 23 runs
Centurion Park, Centurion
Umpires: Rudi Birkenstock (SA) and Nicolas Pretorius (SA)

- Ireland Wolves won the toss and elected to bat.

=== 3rd Unofficial T20I ===
21 February 2020
Scorecard

Ireland Wolves; 196/5 (20 overs)	v	Namibia; 147/8 (20 overs)
Stephen Doheny 58 (33); Craig Williams 3/29 (4 overs)		Craig Williams 59* (38); Jacob Mulder 3/23 (4 overs)

Ireland Wolves won by 49 runs
Irene Villagers Cricket Club, Pretoria
Umpires: Rudi Birkenstock (SA) and Nicolas Pretorius (SA)

- Ireland Wolves won the toss and elected to bat.
- Jan-Izak de Villiers (Namibia) and Curtis Campher (Ireland Wolves) both made their T20 debuts.

=== 4th Unofficial T20I ===
23 February 2020
Scorecard

Namibia; 182/5 (20 overs)	v	Ireland Wolves; 185/3 (18.1 overs)
Craig Williams 63* (30); Craig Young 2/29 (4 overs)		Harry Tector 91 (47); Bernard Scholtz 1/13 (2 overs)

Ireland Wolves won by 7 wickets
Irene Villagers Cricket Club, Pretoria
Umpires: Rudi Birkenstock (SA) and S Camagu (SA)

- Namibia won the toss and elected to bat.

=== 5th Unofficial T20I ===
23 February 2020
Scorecard

Namibia; 206/5 (20 overs)	v	Ireland Wolves; 207/3 (19 overs)
Niko Davin 73* (43); Jacob Mulder 1/32 (4 overs)		Curtis Campher 62* (31); Craig Williams 2/49 (4 overs)

Ireland Wolves won by 7 wickets
Irene Villagers Cricket Club, Pretoria
Umpires: Rudi Birkenstock (SA) and S Camagu (SA)

- Namibia won the toss and elected to bat.
- Tim Tector (Ireland Wolves) made his T20 debut.

== Unofficial ODI series ==
=== 1st Unofficial ODI ===
26 February 2020
Scorecard

Ireland Wolves; 228/8 (50 overs)	v	Namibia; 232/3 (40 overs)
George Dockrell 55 (68); Craig Williams 2/15 (4 overs)		Niko Davin 63 (67); Joshua Little 1/13 (4 overs)

Namibia won by 7 wickets
Irene Villagers Cricket Club, Pretoria

- Namibia won the toss and elected to field.
- Curtis Campher (Ireland Wolves) made his List A debut.

=== 2nd Unofficial ODI ===
27 February 2020
Scorecard

Ireland Wolves; 149 (39.5 overs)	v	Namibia; 150/3 (26.1 overs)
Harry Tector 72 (93); Bernard Scholtz 3/25 (8.5 overs)		Gerhard Erasmus 63* (50); Tyrone Kane 1/11 (3 overs)

Namibia won by 7 wickets
Irene Villagers Cricket Club, Pretoria

- Namibia won the toss and elected to field.
- Mike Frost (Ireland Wolves) made his List A debut.

== Other 50-over match ==
29 February 2020
Scorecard

Northern Titans Invitation XI; 277/7 (50 overs)	v	Ireland Wolves; 281/6 (42.2 overs)
Hardus Viljoen 68 (74); Craig Young 2/28 (6 overs)		Jack Tector 60 (78); Kofi Apea-Adu 2/25 (4 overs)

Ireland Wolves won by 4 wickets
Irene Villagers Cricket Club, Pretoria

- Ireland Wolves won the toss and elected to field.
