= South Africa women's cricket team in England in 2022 =

International cricket tour

	England women	South Africa women
- Dates: 27 June – 25 July 2022
Captains	Heather Knight (Note: Nat Sciver captained England Women for the second and third WT20Is.)	Suné Luus (Note: Chloe Tryon captained South Africa Women for the third WT20I.)

Test series
- Result: 1-match series drawn 0–0
Most runs	Nat Sciver (169)	Marizanne Kapp (193)
Most wickets	Kate Cross (6)	Anneke Bosch (3)

One Day International series
- Results: England women won the 3-match series 3–0
Most runs	Emma Lamb (234)	Chloe Tryon (166)
Most wickets	Charlie Dean (8)	Nadine de Klerk (5)
- Player of the series: Emma Lamb (Eng)

Twenty20 International series
- Results: England women won the 3-match series 3–0
Most runs	Nat Sciver (84)	Anneke Bosch (96)
Most wickets	Katherine Brunt (5); Sophie Ecclestone (5)	Ayabonga Khaka (4)
- Player of the series: Sophie Ecclestone (Eng)

Total points
- England women 14, South Africa women 2

The South Africa women's cricket team toured England to play against the England women's cricket team in June and July 2022. Originally, South Africa were scheduled to tour England in September 2020. The tour was scheduled to consist of four Women's One Day Internationals (WODIs) and two Women's Twenty20 Internationals (WT20Is), with all the matches taking place at the County Cricket Ground in Derby. However, in August 2020, the tour was cancelled due to the COVID-19 pandemic. In February 2022, the England and Wales Cricket Board (ECB) announced a new schedule for the tour, consisting of three WODI matches, three WT20I matches, and a one-off Women's Test match. It was South Africa Women's first Test match since they played India in November 2014. A points-based system was used across all three formats of the tour.

For the one-off Test match, England fielded four debutants, while South Africa had nine of their players earn their maiden Test cap. Batting first, Marizanne Kapp scored 150 runs before South Africa were bowled out for 284 by the close of play on day one. In reply, England made 417/8 before declaring their innings, with Nat Sciver and Alice Davidson-Richards both making centuries. However, across days three and four multiple rain interruptions meant the match ended in a draw. Nat Sciver was named as the player of the match for her 169 not out.

England won the first WODI by five wickets, with Emma Lamb scoring her first century in an international match. In the second match, Sophia Dunkley also scored her first century in WODI cricket. England won the match by 114 runs to win the WODI series with a match to play. England won the third WODI by 109 runs to win the series 3–0.

England won the opening WT20I match by six wickets, with Katherine Brunt taking her 100th wicket in the format. The win meant that England won the points-based series, taking an unassailable 10–2 lead into the final two matches of the tour. Nat Sciver captained England for the second WT20I, after Heather Knight was ruled out of the match with a hip injury. England won the match by six wickets, to win the WT20I series with one match left to play. Katherine Brunt became England's leading wicket-taker in WT20I cricket, taking her 103rd dismissal in the format. England won the third WT20I by 38 runs, winning the series 3–0, and finished the tour 14–2 winners on points.

== Background ==
In April 2020, England's series against the India women's cricket team was postponed due to the COVID-19 pandemic. A month later, Clare Connor, the Director of Cricket for the England and Wales Cricket Board (ECB), suggested that this tour could become a tri-series with India and South Africa. On 18 June 2020, the ECB named a squad of 24 players to who will return to training, with ongoing discussions with the Board of Control for Cricket in India (BCCI) and Cricket South Africa (CSA) about a possible tri-series. On 6 July 2020, the ECB confirmed discussions were still ongoing to host the matches, behind closed doors. However, on 20 July 2020, reports stated that India would not tour, due to the impact of the pandemic in India, with the ECB looking to add further matches between England and South Africa.

When the ECB published the original fixtures for the tour in January 2020, the matches were scheduled to be played at six different venues around England. On 21 July 2020, the ECB announced that all the fixtures would take place at the County Cricket Ground in Derby, with all of the team's training also taking place at the venue, in a bio-secure environment. As a result, Derbyshire County Cricket Club would play their Championship matches away from home. On 23 July 2020, Cricket South Africa named a 24-woman squad to begin training in Pretoria ahead of the series. During the first week of August, England women played warm-up matches in Derby.

On 15 August 2020, the ECB confirmed that they were also in talks with Cricket West Indies. The West Indies women's cricket team could tour England in place of the South African team, due to an increase in coronavirus restrictions in South Africa. On 18 August 2020, Cricket South Africa confirmed that their women's team would not be travelling to England due to the pandemic. Despite the cancellation, the ECB also confirmed they were in talks with other cricket boards to host a possible tour in a bio-secure environment. On 25 August 2020, the ECB confirmed that the West Indies women's team would be touring England.

== Squads ==
WTest		WODIs		WT20I	
England	South Africa	England	South Africa	England	South Africa
Heather Knight (c); Nat Sciver (vc); ~~Emily Arlott~~; Tammy Beaumont; Lauren Bell; Kate Cross; Alice Davidson-Richards; Freya Davies; Charlie Dean; Sophia Dunkley; Sophie Ecclestone; Amy Jones; Emma Lamb; Issy Wong	Suné Luus (c); Anneke Bosch; Trisha Chetty; Nadine de Klerk; Lara Goodall; Shabnim Ismail; Sinalo Jafta; Marizanne Kapp; Ayabonga Khaka; Lizelle Lee; Nonkululeko Mlaba; Tumi Sekhukhune; Andrie Steyn; Chloe Tryon; Laura Wolvaardt	Heather Knight (c); Nat Sciver (vc); Tammy Beaumont; Lauren Bell; Katherine Brunt; Kate Cross; Alice Davidson-Richards; Charlie Dean; Sophia Dunkley; Sophie Ecclestone; Amy Jones; Emma Lamb; Issy Wong; Danni Wyatt	Suné Luus (c); Anneke Bosch; Trisha Chetty; Nadine de Klerk; Lara Goodall; Shabnim Ismail; Sinalo Jafta; Marizanne Kapp; Ayabonga Khaka; Masabata Klaas; ~~Lizelle Lee~~; Nonkululeko Mlaba; Tumi Sekhukhune; Andrie Steyn; Chloe Tryon; Delmi Tucker; Laura Wolvaardt	Heather Knight (c); Nat Sciver (vc); Maia Bouchier; Katherine Brunt; Alice Capsey; Kate Cross; Freya Davies; Sophia Dunkley; Sophie Ecclestone; Sarah Glenn; Amy Jones; Freya Kemp; Bryony Smith; Issy Wong; Danni Wyatt	Suné Luus (c); Chloe Tryon (vc); Anneke Bosch; Tazmin Brits; Trisha Chetty; Nadine de Klerk; Mignon du Preez; Lara Goodall; Shabnim Ismail; Sinalo Jafta; ~~Marizanne Kapp~~; Ayabonga Khaka; Masabata Klaas; Nonkululeko Mlaba; ~~Tumi Sekhukhune~~; Delmi Tucker; Laura Wolvaardt

Issy Wong was initially named as a travelling reserve for England Women's Test team. On 25 June 2022, Wong was added to England's Test squad, after Emily Arlott was ruled out of the match after not recovering from COVID-19. Prior to the WODI matches, South Africa's Lizelle Lee announced her retirement from international cricket. Ahead of the second ODI, Masabata Klaas and Delmi Tucker were added to South Africa's squad for the remaining matches of the series. For the WT20I series, Marizanne Kapp and Tumi Sekhukhune were both ruled out of South Africa's squad with Tazmin Brits added to their team.

== Warm-up matches ==
21–23 June 2022
Scorecard

South Africa	v	England A
301 (80 overs); Laura Wolvaardt 101 (148); Sarah Glenn 5/47 (20 overs)		276/9d (78 overs); Georgia Elwiss 100* (122); Anneke Bosch 3/17 (8 overs)
325/9d (89 overs); Andrie Steyn 63 (144); Grace Potts 3/41 (11 overs)		123/3 (36 overs); Evelyn Jones 59 (98); Nonkululeko Mlaba 2/33 (14 overs)

Match drawn
Arundel Castle Cricket Ground, Arundel
Umpires: Anna Harris (Eng) and Jasmine Naeem (Eng)

- South Africa Women won the toss and elected to bat.

4 July 2022
14:00 (D/N)
Scorecard

England A 155/5 (20 overs)	v	South Africa; 140/6 (20 overs)
Maia Bouchier 49 (42); Suné Luus 1/7 (2 overs)		Suné Luus 45 (34); Linsey Smith 2/18 (4 overs)

England A Women won by 15 runs
Sophia Gardens, Cardiff
Umpires: Sarah Bartlett (Eng) and Jasmine Naeem (Eng)

- England A Women won the toss and elected to bat.

7 July 2022
11:00
Scorecard

South Africa; 264/7 (50 overs)	v	England A 267/3 (43.3 overs)
Laura Wolvaardt 72 (89); Sarah Glenn 2/27 (8 overs)		Lauren Winfield-Hill 95* (66); Nonkululeko Mlaba 2/54 (10 overs)

England A Women won by 7 wickets
Grace Road, Leicester
Umpires: Sarah Bartlett (Eng) and Sophie McLelland (Eng)

- South Africa Women won the toss and elected to bat.

== Only WTest ==
27–30 June 2022
Scorecard

South Africa	v	England
284 (91.4 overs); Marizanne Kapp 150 (213); Kate Cross 4/63 (17.4 overs)		417/8d (120 overs); Nat Sciver 169* (263); Anneke Bosch 3/77 (18 overs)
181/5 (68.1 overs); Marizanne Kapp 43* (58); Issy Wong 2/46 (14.1 overs)

Match drawn
County Ground, Taunton
Umpires: Anna Harris (Eng) and Sue Redfern (Eng)
Player of the match: Nat Sciver (Eng)

- England Women won the toss and elected to field.
- Only 45.1 and 43.1 overs were bowled on days 3 and 4 respectively due to rain.
- Lauren Bell, Alice Davidson-Richards, Emma Lamb, Issy Wong (Eng), Anneke Bosch, Nadine de Klerk, Lara Goodall, Sinalo Jafta, Suné Luus, Nonkululeko Mlaba, Tumi Sekhukhune, Andrie Steyn and Laura Wolvaardt (SA) all made their Test debuts.
- Marizanne Kapp scored her first century in Tests, and made the highest individual score for South Africa in a women's Test match.
- Nat Sciver (Eng) scored her first century in Tests.
- Alice Davidson-Richards (Eng) scored her first century in Tests.
- Points: England Women 2, South Africa Women 2.

== WODI series ==
=== 1st WODI ===
11 July 2022
14:00 (D/N)
Scorecard

South Africa; 218 (47.4 overs)	v	England; 219/5 (32.1 overs)
Chloe Tryon 88 (73); Nat Sciver 4/59 (9.4 overs)		Emma Lamb 102 (97); Nadine de Klerk 2/44 (8 overs)

England Women won by 5 wickets
County Cricket Ground, Northampton
Umpires: Anna Harris (Eng) and Graham Lloyd (Eng)
Player of the match: Emma Lamb (Eng)

- South Africa Women won the toss and elected to bat.
- Emma Lamb (Eng) scored her first century in WODIs.
- Points: England Women 2, South Africa Women 0.

=== 2nd WODI ===
15 July 2022
14:00 (D/N)
Scorecard

England; 337/5 (50 overs)	v	South Africa; 223 (41 overs)
Sophia Dunkley 107 (93); Chloe Tryon 2/34 (7 overs)		Marizanne Kapp 73 (59); Charlie Dean 4/53 (10 overs)

England Women won by 114 runs
Bristol County Ground, Bristol
Umpires: Anna Harris (Eng) and Nigel Llong (Eng)
Player of the match: Sophia Dunkley (Eng)

- England Women won the toss and elected to bat.
- Lauren Bell and Issy Wong (Eng) both made their WODI debuts.
- Sophia Dunkley (Eng) scored her first century in WODIs.
- Points: England Women 2, South Africa Women 0.

=== 3rd WODI ===
18 July 2022
14:00 (D/N)
Scorecard

England; 371/7 (50 overs)	v	South Africa; 262 (45.4 overs)
Tammy Beaumont 119 (107); Ayabonga Khaka 2/64 (10 overs)		Chloe Tryon 70 (57); Alice Davidson-Richards 3/35 (6.4 overs)

England Women won by 109 runs
Grace Road, Leicester
Umpires: Anna Harris (Eng) and Sue Redfern (Eng)
Player of the match: Tammy Beaumont (Eng)

- South Africa Women won the toss and elected to field.
- Points: England Women 2, South Africa Women 0.

== WT20I series ==
=== 1st WT20I ===
21 July 2022
19:00 (D/N)
Scorecard

South Africa; 111/9 (20 overs)	v	England; 114/4 (15 overs)
Laura Wolvaardt 55 (49); Katherine Brunt 4/15 (4 overs)		Sophia Dunkley 59 (39); Ayabonga Khaka 3/13 (4 overs)

England Women won by 6 wickets
County Cricket Ground, Chelmsford
Umpires: Rob Bailey (Eng) and Sarah Bartlett (Eng)
Player of the match: Katherine Brunt (Eng)

- England Women won the toss and elected to field.
- Issy Wong (Eng) and Delmi Tucker (SA) both made their WT20I debuts.
- Katherine Brunt (Eng) took her 100th wicket in WT20Is.
- Points: England Women 2, South Africa Women 0.

=== 2nd WT20I ===
23 July 2022
14:30
Scorecard

South Africa; 148/6 (20 overs)	v	England; 151/4 (19 overs)
Anneke Bosch 61 (57); Sarah Glenn 2/27 (4 overs)		Nat Sciver 47 (41); Ayabonga Khaka 1/10 (3 overs)

England Women won by 6 wickets
New Road, Worcester
Umpires: Steve O'Shaughnessy (Eng) and Sue Redfern (Eng)
Player of the match: Danni Wyatt (Eng)

- England Women won the toss and elected to field.
- Alice Capsey (Eng) made her WT20I debut.
- Katherine Brunt became the leading wicket-taker for England in WT20Is.
- Danni Wyatt (Eng) scored her 2,000th run in WT20Is.
- Points: England Women 2, South Africa Women 0.

=== 3rd WT20I ===
25 July 2022
18:30 (D/N)
Scorecard

England; 176/6 (20 overs)	v	South Africa; 138/6 (20 overs)
Sophie Ecclestone 33* (12); Nonkululeko Mlaba 3/22 (4 overs)		Tazmin Brits 59 (57); Freya Kemp 2/18 (3 overs)

England Women won by 38 runs
County Cricket Ground, Derby
Umpires: Rob Bailey (Eng) and Sarah Bartlett (Eng)
Player of the match: Sophie Ecclestone (Eng)

- England Women won the toss and elected to bat.
- Freya Kemp (Eng) made her WT20I debut.
- Points: England Women 2, South Africa Women 0.
