= List of South Africa women Twenty20 International cricketers =

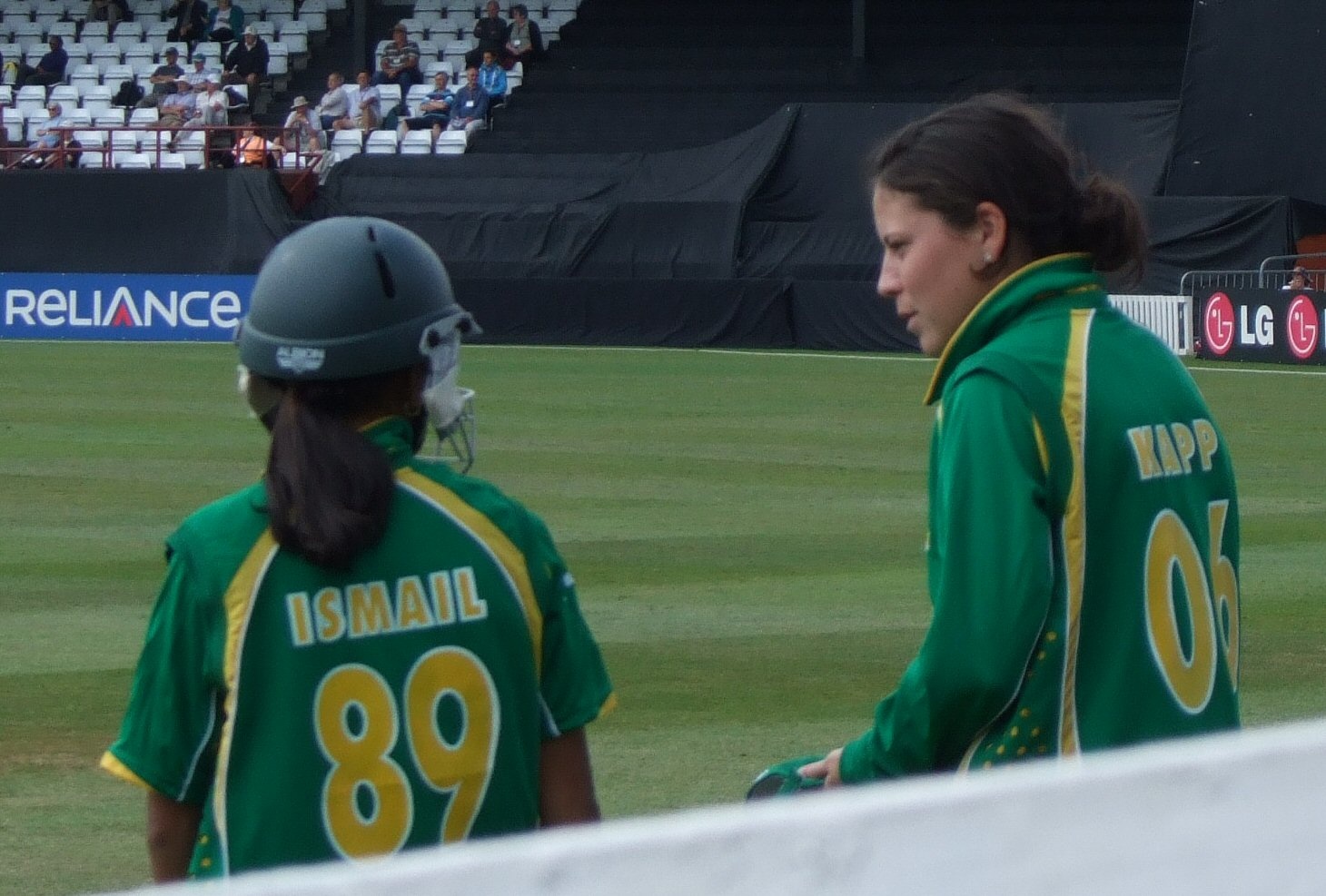
Shabnim Ismail and Marizanne Kapp at Taunton in 2009

Women's Twenty20 International is a 20 overs-per-side cricket match played in a maximum of 150 minutes between any two of the ICC member sides. The first Twenty20 International match was held in August 2004 between England and New Zealand, six months before the first Twenty20 International match was played between two men's teams. The South Africa national women's cricket team played their first Twenty20 International match at the County Ground, Taunton in 2007, facing New Zealand, as the two teams' tours of England overlapped.

Since the team was formed, 62 women have represented South Africa in Twenty20 International cricket. This list includes all players who have played at least one Twenty20 International match and is initially arranged in the order of debut appearance. Where more than one player won their first cap in the same match, those players are initially listed alphabetically by last name at the time of debut.

== Key ==
General

- ‡ – Captain
- † – Wicket-keeper
- First – Year of debut
- Last – Year of latest game
- Mat – Number of matches played
- Win% – Winning percentage

Batting

- Runs – Runs scored in career
- HS – Highest score
- 100 – Centuries scored
- 50 – Half-centuries scored
- Avg – Runs scored per dismissal
- * – Batsman remained not out

Bowling

- Balls – Balls bowled in career
- Wkt – Wickets taken in career
- BBI – Best bowling in an innings
- Ave – Average runs per wicket

Fielding

- Ca – Catches taken
- St – Stumpings taken

== List of players ==
Statistics are correct as of 19 September 2026.

South Africa women T20I cricketers
General					Batting					Bowling				Fielding		Ref				
Cap	Name	First	Last	Mat	Runs	HS	Avg	50	100	Balls	Wkt	BBI	Ave	Ca	St	Ref				
Cap	Name	First	Last	Mat	1	Susan Benade	2007	2013	19	274	53*	16.11	1	0	288	13	2/7	22.46	5	–
2	Cri-Zelda Brits‡	2007	2013	19	405	57*	27.00	2	0	–	–	–	–	3	–					
3	Trisha Chetty†	2007	2022	82	1117	55	17.18	3	0	–	–	–	–	42	28					
4	Mignon du Preez‡	2007	2022	114	1805	69	20.98	7	0	18	0	–	–	26	–					
5	Shabnim Ismail	2007	2026	119	191	20*	7.07	0	0	2513	131	5/12	18.65	38	–					
6	Ashlyn Kilowan	2007	2009	11	33	22	8.25	0	0	218	10	3/20	23.60	3	–					
7	Marcia Letsoalo	2007	2016	48	20	10	3.33	0	0	626	19	2/15	34.84	11	–					
8	Johmari Logtenberg	2007	2007	2	30	29	15.00	0	0	42	2	2/35	33.50	0	–					
9	Sunette Loubser‡	2007	2014	43	127	37*	7.47	0	0	814	31	3/22	26.80	10	–					
10	Alicia Smith‡	2007	2010	14	156	44	15.60	0	0	156	7	2/23	26.00	8	–					
11	Claire Terblanche	2007	2008	5	34	22	11.33	0	0	–	–	–	–	1	–					
12	Annelie Minny†	2007	2008	5	52	22	13.00	0	0	–	–	–	–	3	0					
13	Dinesha Devnarain‡	2008	2016	22	100	24	16.66	0	0	102	1	1/22	130.00	1	–					
14	Daleen Terblanche	2008	2008	2	46	37	23.00	0	0	–	–	–	–	0	–					
15	Charlize van der Westhuizen	2008	2010	12	37	14*	7.40	0	0	271	10	2/27	26.80	4	–					
16	Olivia Anderson	2008	2008	2	1	1	0.50	0	0	–	–	–	–	0	–					
17	Shandre Fritz	2008	2014	26	384	116*	19.20	1	1	42	1	1/12	60.00	10	–					
18	Dane van Niekerk‡	2009	2026	94	1962	90*	27.25	10	0	1500	65	4/17	20.96	25	–					
19	Marizanne Kapp	2009	2026	126	1774	81*	20.87	6	0	2250	101	4/6	20.51	20	–					
20	Angelique Taai	2009	2010	7	21	11	4.20	0	0	93	6	3/9	19.50	1	–					
21	Kirstie Thomson	2009	2011	6	54	32	13.50	0	0	35	0	–	–	1	–					
22	Chloe Tryon‡	2010	2026	131	1422	57*	18.71	1	0	1535	51	4/15	34.62	34	–					
23	Jana Nell	2010	2010	3	17	17*	8.50	0	0	24	2	2/12	6.00	2	–					
24	Moseline Daniels	2010	2019	40	20	8*	5.00	0	0	801	28	3/13	23.64	8	–					
25	Masabata Klaas	2010	2026	74	59	12*	4.53	0	0	1253	48	4/21	33.79	14	–					
26	Alison Hodgkinson	2011	2012	8	161	51	23.00	1	0	–	–	–	–	0	–					
27	Melissa Smook	2011	2011	3	2	2*	–	0	0	12	0	–	–	0	–					
28	Yolandi van der Westhuizen	2011	2014	12	20	11	4.00	0	0	–	–	–	–	2	–					
29	Ayabonga Khaka	2012	2026	89	58	12*	9.66	0	0	1817	81	4/23	26.11	12	–					
30	Suné Luus‡	2012	2026	146	1872	81	22.55	8	0	1218	57	5/8	23.56	47	–					
31	Savanna Cordes†	2013	2013	2	0	0	0.00	0	0	–	–	–	–	0	1					
32	Elriesa Theunissen-Fourie	2013	2013	1	0	0*	–	0	0	–	–	–	–	0	–					
33	Yolandi Potgieter	2013	2014	7	5	5*	–	0	0	60	0	–	–	2	–					
34	Alexis le Breton	2013	2013	5	24	14	12.00	0	0	–	–	–	–	0	–					
35	Lizelle Lee†	2013	2021	82	1896	101	25.62	13	1	42	0	–	–	29	1					
36	Nadine Moodley	2014	2015	9	30	17	7.50	0	0	–	–	–	–	0	–					
37	Bernadine Bezuidenhout† (Note: Bernadine Bezuidenhout also played Wt20I cricket for New Zealand. Only her records for South Africa are given above.)	2014	2018	16	103	34	10.30	0	0	–	–	–	–	4	2					
38	Andrie Steyn	2014	2014	5	42	35	21.00	0	0	–	–	–	–	1	–					
39	Yolani Fourie	2014	2018	10	11	7*	11.00	0	0	120	3	2/20	44.66	1	–					
40	Nonkhululeko Thabethe	2014	2014	1	0	0	0.00	0	0	–	–	–	–	0	–					
41	Odine Kirsten	2016	2016	2	5	3	5.00	0	0	30	1	1/26	45.00	1	–					
42	Lara Goodall	2016	2026	23	302	52	18.87	1	0	–	–	–	–	4	–					
43	Laura Wolvaardt‡	2016	2026	109	3049	126*	38.11	16	4	–	–	–	–	32	–					
44	Nadine de Klerk‡	2018	2026	87	852	44*	24.34	0	0	1353	64	3/7	27.14	22	–					
45	Raisibe Ntozakhe	2018	2018	12	0	0*	–	0	0	168	3	1/10	75.66	1	–					
46	Stacey Lackay	2018	2018	5	16	11*	8.00	0	0	24	2	2/59	29.50	2	–					
47	Tazmin Brits‡	2018	2026	84	2143	114*	32.43	16	1	–	–	–	–	31	–					
48	Zintle Mali	2018	2019	9	2	2*	–	0	0	153	6	2/24	35.00	1	–					
49	Robyn Searle	2018	2018	2	28	14	14.00	0	0	–	–	–	–	0	–					
50	Tumi Sekhukhune	2018	2026	44	17	4*	5.66	0	0	774	47	3/20	20.44	19	–					
51	Saarah Smith	2018	2019	7	6	4	3.00	0	0	42	4	2/17	14.25	0	–					
52	Faye Tunnicliffe†	2018	2026	18	209	52*	17.41	2	0	–	–	–	–	1	2					
53	Sinalo Jafta†	2019	2026	73	172	17*	11.46	0	0	–	–	–	–	35	11					
54	Nondumiso Shangase	2019	2026	19	104	31	14.85	0	0	177	11	3/20	20.90	8	–					
55	Nonkululeko Mlaba	2019	2026	83	26	9*	4.33	0	0	1675	79	4/29	22.59	8	–					
56	Anneke Bosch	2019	2026	57	1149	83	28.02	7	0	168	10	2/11	19.90	21	–					
57	Delmi Tucker	2022	2023	14	50	15*	8.33	0	0	168	3	1/14	63.66	2	–					
58	Annerie Dercksen	2023	2026	47	634	55*	28.81	2	0	326	15	5/15	27.80	15	–					
59	Mieke de Ridder	2023	2023	2	1	1	1.00	0	0	–	–	–	–	0	–					
60	Eliz-Mari Marx	2023	2026	16	46	21*	11.50	0	0	266	12	3/19	26.75	1	–					
61	Ayanda Hlubi	2023	2026	12	7	7	7.00	0	0	225	13	3/24	23.61	1	–					
62	Karabo Meso	2024	2026	12	83	50*	20.75	1	0	–	–	–	–	8	1					
63	Seshnie Naidu	2024	2024	7	–	–	–	–	–	120	5	3/26	34.60	4	–					
64	Miane Smit	2025	2026	6	221	102	44.20	1	1	18	0	–	–	0	–					
65	Kayla Reyneke	2026	2026	16	213	34*	35.50	0	0	144	8	3/29	21.37	3	–					
66	Nthabiseng Nini	2026	2026	3	–	–	–	–	–	63	7	3/17	10.28	2	–					
67	Caitlin Wyngaard	2026	2026	4	–	–	–	–	–	72	3	2/15	22.33	0	–					
68	Luyanda Nzuza	2026	2026	2	–	–	–	–	–	42	2	1/19	19.50	0	–					
69	Jae-Leigh Filander	2026	2026	1	–	–	–	–	–	–	–	–	–	0	–					

== List of captains ==
South Africa women T20I captains
No.	Name	First	Last	Mat	Won	Lost	Tied	No Result	Win%
1	Cri-Zelda Brits	2007	2010	12	3	9	0	0	25.00%
2	Sunette Loubser	2009	2009	5	0	5	0	0	0.00%
3	Alicia Smith	2009	2009	1	0	1	0	0	0.00%
4	Mignon du Preez	2011	2016	50	24	25	0	1	48.97%
5	Dane van Niekerk	2014	2021	30	15	13	0	2	53.57%
6	Dinesha Devnarain	2016	2016	2	1	1	0	0	50.00%
7	Chloe Tyron	2018	2024	7	3	4	0	0	42.85%
8	Sune Luus	2019	2023	34	17	16	0	1	51.51%
9	Laura Wolvaardt	2023	2026	51	25	23	0	3	52.08%
10	Tazmin Brits	2023	2023	1	0	1	0	0	0.00%
11	Nadine de Klerk	2024	2024	1	0	1	0	0	0.00%
