= Alana Dalzell =

Northern Irish cricketer (born 2001)

Personal information
- Full name: Alana Dalzell
- Born: 26 March 2001 (age 25); Derry, Northern Ireland
- Batting: Right-handed
- Bowling: Right-arm medium
- Role: Bowler

International information
- National side: Ireland
- ODI debut (cap 94): 14 June 2022 v South Africa
- Last ODI: 12 July 2026 v West Indies
- T20I debut (cap 55): October 23 2023 v Scotland
- Last T20I: 16 June 2026 v West Indies

Domestic team information
- Years: Team
- 2020–2021: Scorchers
- 2022–present: Dragons

Career statistics
Competition	WODI	WT20I	WLA	WT20
Matches	10	24	39	52
Runs scored	52	37	344	239
Batting average	17.33	6.16	14.33	11.95
100s/50s	0/0	0/0	0/0	0/0
Top score	19	14	36*	35
Balls bowled	359	423	1356	848
Wickets	8	17	27	33
Bowling average	44.50	29.00	43.37	28.90
5 wickets in innings	0	0	0	0
10 wickets in match	0	0	0	0
Best bowling	4/36	2/8	4/32	2/8
Catches/stumpings	2/–	6/-	9/-	10/-
- Source: CricketArchive, 16 August 2024

Alana Dalzell (born 26 March 2001) is a Northern Irish cricketer who plays as a right-handed batter and right-arm medium bowler.

== International career ==
She was named in Ireland's squad for their series against South Africa in June 2022, and made her Women's One Day International (WODI) debut, against South Africa, on 14 June.

She became the first player from the North West of Ireland to play a WODI since Julie Logue in 1996.

Dalzell made her Women's T20I debut against Scotland in Almeria, taking 2/8 from her 3 overs as she opened the bowling.

In June 2024, she was awarded a full-time professional contract by Cricket Ireland. Dalzell said “This will allow me to work even harder at my game, but also spend more time outside of the nets to really focus on my strength and conditioning as well. Growing up in cricket without any female role models, I feel privileged to hopefully show young girls that there are now so many opportunities to expand your career in sport.”

On 11 September 2024, Dalzell struck a final ball boundary to win the 3rd ODI against England in Belfast. It was Ireland's first victory against England in an ODI in over 23 years.

Having initially been left out, she was a late addition to the Ireland squad for their T20I and ODI tour to Bangladesh in November 2024 as a replacement for the injured Jane Maguire.

Dalzell was part of the Ireland squad for the 2025 Women's Cricket World Cup Qualifier in Pakistan in April 2025.

== Domestic career ==
Dalzell has played in the Women's Super Series since 2020, playing for Scorchers in 2020 and 2021 before joining Dragons in 2022. She plays club cricket for Bready Cricket Club.
