= Starlights (women's cricket) =

South African women's cricket team

Personnel
- Captain: Dane van Niekerk
- Coach: Claire Terblanche

Team information
- Colours: Light green
- Founded: 2019

History
- WSL wins: 1

Starlights, previously known as Terblanche XI, are a South African women's cricket team that compete in the Women's T20 Super League. The team has no geographical base, instead being made up of some of the best players from across South Africa. They are captained by Dane van Niekerk and coached by Claire Terblanche. They have won one T20 Super League, the 2019–20 edition.

== History ==
Starlights were first formed in 2019 to compete in the Women's T20 Super League, a tournament designed to provide more competitive cricket to the best players in South Africa. For the first edition of the tournament, the side was named after its coach, Claire Terblanche, becoming Terblanche XI. They were captained by Laura Wolvaardt. Terblanche XI finished bottom of the inaugural tournament, losing all three of their matches. However, Wolvaardt was the leading run-scorer in the tournament, with 188 runs including 110 made against M van der Merwe XI, and Terblanche XI bowler Masabata Klaas was the leading wicket-taker in the tournament, with 6 wickets.

For the following edition of the tournament, which took place two months later in December 2019, the side was named Starlights. Terblanche was retained as coach, with Chloe Tryon being named as captain of the side. The side went on to win the tournament, winning two of their matches and edging out their competitors on Net Run Rate.

The third edition of the tournament took place in December 2020. Tryon and Terblanche were retained as captain and coach of the side, respectively, as well as selecting South Africa stars Lizelle Lee, Masabata Klaas and Andrie Steyn in the draft that took place prior to the competition. Starlights went on to finish 3rd in the tournament, winning one out of three of their matches, a 2 run victory over eventual winners Coronations. Klaas was the second leading wicket-taker in the tournament, with 6 wickets, including taking 3/25 in the side's one victory.

The tournament returned for its fourth edition in December 2022, with Starlights gaining a new captain in Dane van Niekerk. The side finished top of the tournament standings, although with five matches abandoned due to rain, no overall winner was crowned.

== Seasons ==
=== Women's T20 Super League ===
Season	League standings							Notes
Season	P	W	L	T	A/C	Pts	Pos	Notes
2019	3	0	3	0	0	0	4th	
2019–20	3	2	1	0	0	4	1st	Champions
2020–21	3	1	2	0	0	2	3rd	
2022–23	6	4	0	0	0	2	1st	No overall winner crowned due to rain

== Honours ==
- Women's T20 Super League:
  - Winners (1): 2019–20
