= Coronations (women's cricket) =

South African women's cricket team

Personnel
- Captain: Lara Goodall
- Coach: Martelize van der Merwe

Team information
- Colours: Black
- Founded: 2019

History
- WSL wins: 2

Coronations, previously known as Devnarain XI, are a South African women's cricket team that compete in the Women's T20 Super League. The team has no geographical base, instead being made up of some of the best players from across South Africa. They are captained by Lara Goodall and coached by Martelize van der Merwe. They have won two T20 Super League tournaments, in 2019 and 2020–21.

== History ==
Coronations were first formed in 2019 to compete in the Women's T20 Super League, a tournament designed to provide more competitive cricket to the best players in South Africa. For the first edition of the tournament, the side was named after its coach, Dinesha Devnarain, becoming Devnarain XI. They were captained by Mignon du Preez. Devnarain XI were the inaugural winners of the Super League, winning all three of their matches. Their most notable performance game in their final match, with Faye Tunnicliffe hitting 106* in a 102 run victory over F van der Merwe XI.

For the following edition of the tournament, which took place two months later in December 2019, the side was named Coronations. van Niekerk and Devnarain were retained as captain and coach, respectively. The side won two of their three matches, and finished second overall on Net Run Rate.

The third edition of the tournament took place in December 2020. Adele van Eck became coach of the side, and picked Nadine de Klerk as captain in the draft that took place prior to the competition, along with fellow South Africa stars Laura Wolvaardt and Ayabonga Khaka. Coronations went on to win the tournament, winning two out of three of their matches and edging out Thistles on Net Run Rate. Woolvardt was the second leading run-scorer in the tournament, including making 61 in the side's 6 run victory over Duchesses.

The tournament returned for its fourth edition in December 2022, with Lara Goodall named as the new captain and Martelize van der Merwe becoming the coach. The side finished second in the tournament standings, although with five matches abandoned due to rain, no overall winner was crowned.

== Seasons ==
=== Women's T20 Super League ===
Season	League standings							Notes
Season	P	W	L	T	A/C	Pts	Pos	Notes
2019	3	3	0	0	0	6	1st	Champions
2019–20	3	2	1	0	0	4	2nd	
2020–21	3	2	1	0	0	4	1st	Champions
2022–23	6	2	1	0	3	7	2nd	

== Honours ==
- Women's T20 Super League:
  - Winners (2): 2019 & 2020–21
