= Nondumiso Shangase =

South African cricketer (born 1996)

Personal information
- Full name: Nondumiso Precious Shangase
- Born: 5 April 1996 (age 30); Durban, South Africa
- Nickname: Nondu, Ndumi
- Batting: Right-handed
- Bowling: Right-arm off break
- Role: Bowler

International information
- National side: South Africa (2019-present)
- ODI debut (cap 85): 9 October 2019 v India
- Last ODI: 2 November 2025 v India
- ODI shirt no.: 4
- T20I debut (cap 54): 19 May 2019 v Pakistan
- Last T20I: 27 November 2024 v England

Domestic team information
- Years: Team
- 2014/15–present: KwaZulu-Natal Coastal

Career statistics
Competition	WODI	WT20I
Matches	11	12
Runs scored	38	22
Batting average	6.33	5.50
100s/50s	0/0	0/0
Top score	16	16
Balls bowled	461	123
Wickets	6	10
Bowling average	67.16	16.90
5 wickets in innings	0	0
10 wickets in match	0	0
Best bowling	2/43	3/20
Catches/stumpings	2/–	4/–
Medal record
Women's cricket
Representing South Africa
ICC Cricket World Cup
Runner-up	2025 India
African Games
Silver medal – second place	2023 Accra
- Source: Cricinfo, 28 November 2024

Nondumiso Precious Shangase (born 5 April 1996) is a South African cricketer who plays as a right-arm off break bowler.

== Career ==
In April 2019, she was named in South Africa's squads for their series against Pakistan. She made her Women's Twenty20 International (WT20I) debut for South Africa against Pakistan on 19 May 2019.

In September 2019, she was named in the Terblanche XI squad for the inaugural edition of the Women's T20 Super League in South Africa. In the same month, she was named in South Africa's Women's One Day International (WODI) squad for their series against India. She made her WODI debut for South Africa, against India, on 9 October 2019. In January 2020, she was named in South Africa's squad for the 2020 ICC Women's T20 World Cup in Australia. On 23 July 2020, Shangase was named in South Africa's 24-woman squad to begin training in Pretoria, ahead of their tour to England.

In April 2021, she was part of the South African Emerging Women's squad that toured Bangladesh.

Shangase was named in the South Africa squad for the T20 part of their multi-format home series against England in November 2024.
