= Duchesses (women's cricket) =

South African women's cricket team

Team information
- Colours: Red
- Founded: 2019

History
- WSL wins: 0

Duchesses, previously known as M van der Merwe XI, are a South African women's cricket team that competed in the Women's T20 Super League. The team has no geographical base, and was instead made up of some of the best players from across South Africa. Their best T20 Super League finish came in the first edition of the tournament, 2019, when they were runners-up. For the 2022–23 Women's T20 Super League, they were replaced by a South Africa Under-19 team in the competition.

== History ==
Duchesses were first formed in 2019 to compete in the Women's T20 Super League, a tournament designed to provide more competitive cricket to the best players in South Africa. For the first edition of the tournament, the side was named after its coach, Martelize van der Merwe, becoming M van der Merwe XI. They were captained by Suné Luus. M van der Merwe XI won two of their three matches in the first tournament, therefore finishing second overall. Batter Lizelle Lee was the second leading run-scorer in the tournament, including hitting 92* in the opening match of the competition.

For the following edition of the tournament, which took place two months later in December 2019, the side was named Duchesses. Luus and van der Merwe were retained as captain and coach, respectively. The side again won two of their three matches, and finished third overall on Net Run Rate.

The third edition of the tournament took place in December 2020. Martelize van der Merwe remained as coach of the side, and retained Luus as captain in the draft that took place prior to the competition, as well as picking fellow South Africa stars Mignon du Preez and Sinalo Jafta. Duchesses won one match in the tournament, beating Starlights by just one run, but finished bottom of the table on Net Run Rate. Luus was the leading run-scorer in the tournament, with 150 runs including two half-centuries.

For the next edition of the tournament, the 2022–23 Women's T20 Super League, Duchesses were removed from the competition, being replaced by a South Africa Under-19s team.

== Seasons ==
=== Women's T20 Super League ===
Season	League standings							Notes
Season	P	W	L	T	A/C	Pts	Pos	Notes
2019	3	2	1	0	0	4	2nd	
2019–20	3	2	1	0	0	4	3rd	
2020–21	3	1	2	0	0	2	4th	

== Honours ==
- Women's T20 Super League:
  - Winners (0):
  - Best finish: Runners-up (2019)
