= Irene Villagers Cricket Club Ground =

Cricket ground in Irene, South Africa

Coordinates: 25°53′2″S 28°13′19″E

- Interactive map of Irene Villagers Cricket Club Ground
- Location: Irene Country Club, Irene, Gauteng
- Country: South Africa
- Owner: Irene Country Club

The Irene Villagers Cricket Club Ground is a first-class cricket ground at the Irene Country Club in Irene, south of Pretoria, South Africa.

The ground, on the bank of the Hennops River, has been the main home ground for the Irene Villagers Cricket Club since the club's inception in 1965. It has also been used for several non-first-class tournaments since 1998.

The Bangladesh A team played four minor matches there on their tour of South Africa and Zimbabwe in 2015-16. A few weeks later the ground staged its first first-class and List A cricket matches, when Northerns played two home matches there against North West in December 2015. North West won both matches.
