= Kirstie Thomson =

South African cricketer (born 1988)

Personal information
- Full name: Kirstie Thomson
- Born: 21 October 1988 (age 38); Johannesburg, South Africa
- Batting: Right-handed
- Bowling: Right arm medium
- Role: All-rounder

International information
- National side: South Africa (2009–2011)
- ODI debut (cap 56): 16 October 2009 v West Indies
- Last ODI: 26 November 2011 v Sri Lanka
- T20I debut (cap 21): 25 October 2009 v West Indies
- Last T20I: 30 October 2011 v England

Domestic team information
- Years: Team
- 2006/07–present: Central Gauteng

Career statistics
Competition	WODI	WT20I
Matches	9	6
Runs scored	150	54
Batting average	18.75	13.50
100s/50s	0/0	0/0
Top score	27	32
Balls bowled	66	35
Wickets	0	0
Bowling average	–	–
5 wickets in innings	0	0
10 wickets in match	0	0
Best bowling	–	–
Catches/stumpings	4/–	1/–
- Source: Cricinfo, 15 February 2021

Kirstie Thomson (born 21 October 1988) is a South African cricketer who plays as a right-handed batter and right-arm medium bowler from Johannesburg, Gauteng. She made 9 One Day International and 6 Twenty20 International appearances for South Africa between 2009 and 2011. She plays domestic cricket for Central Gauteng.

== Early life and education ==
Thomson was born in Johannesburg and attended De La Salle Holy Cross College. She began playing mini-cricket at an early age and progressed through local clubs and provincial pathways in Gauteng before establishing herself at senior domestic level.

== Domestic career ==
Thomson enjoyed a lengthy domestic career for Gauteng/Central Gauteng and for club sides including the Wanderers, becoming one of the Lions’ most consistent batters across many seasons.

In the 2024–25 season Thomson announced her retirement from provincial/professional cricket. Lions held a farewell innings and honoured her contribution to the side.

== International career ==
Thomson made her senior international debut for South Africa in October 2009 during the West Indies tour of South Africa (ODI debut: 16 October 2009; T20I debut: 25 October 2009). She appeared for the national side between 2009 and 2011, making nine WODI and six WT20I appearances.

In April 2021, she was part of the South African Emerging Women's squad that toured Bangladesh.

== Playing style ==
A right-handed batter, Thomson typically occupied the top order in domestic cricket and provided occasional right-arm medium pace. She was valued domestically for her ability to build innings in List A cricket and for dependable fielding.

== Personal life ==
Outside cricket, Thomson trained and practised as a medical doctor and has specialised in diagnostic radiology while combining work and sport during her playing career.
