= Annerie Dercksen =

South African cricketer (born 2001)

Personal information
- Born: 26 April 2001 (age 25); Beaufort West, Western Cape, South Africa
- Batting: Right-handed
- Bowling: Right-arm medium
- Role: All-rounder

International information
- National side: South Africa
- Test debut (cap 71): 28 June 2024 v India
- Last Test: 15 December 2024 v England
- ODI debut (cap 91): 16 June 2024 v India
- Last ODI: 2 November 2025 v India
- T20I debut (cap 58): 25 January 2023 v West Indies
- Last T20I: 30 November 2024 v England
- T20I shirt no.: 77

Domestic team information
- Years: Team
- 2018/19–2019/20: South Western Districts
- 2019/20–2021/22: Free State
- 2022/23–present: South Western Districts

Career statistics
Competition	WTest	WODI	WT20I
Matches	2	8	22
Runs scored	60	346	170
Batting average	15.00	49.42	24.28
100s/50s	0/0	1/2	0/0
Top score	41	104	44*
Balls bowled	180	209	122
Wickets	0	8	5
Bowling average	–	28.75	31.80
5 wickets in innings	–	0	0
10 wickets in match	–	0	0
Best bowling	–	3/16	2/15
Catches/stumpings	1/–	3/–	5/–
Medal record
Women's cricket
Representing South Africa
ICC Cricket World Cup
Runner-up	2025 India
ICC T20 World Cup
Runner-up	2023 South Africa
Runner-up	2024 UAE
African Games
Silver medal – second place	2023 Accra
- Source: ESPNcricinfo, 9 May 2025

Annerie Dercksen (born 26 April 2001) is a South African cricketer who plays for South Africa as a right-hand batter and right-arm medium fast bowler.

== Career ==
In January 2023, she was named in the South Africa Women's squad for the South Africa Tri-Nation Series. She made her Twenty20 International debut against West Indies at Buffalo Park, East London in South Africa.

In January 2023, she was named in South Africa's squad for the 2023 ICC Women's T20 World Cup in South Africa.

She was named in the South Africa squad for the 2024 ICC Women's T20 World Cup and for their multi-format home series against England in November 2024.

Dercksen was among the four player shortlist for the ICC Women's Emerging Cricketer of the Year 2024.

She scored her maiden ODI century against Sri Lanka at R. Premadasa Stadium, Colombo during the Tri-Nation Series, on 9 May 2025, making 104 off 84 balls including nine 4s and five 6s.
