= Dinesha Devnarain =

South African cricketer and coach (born 1988)

Personal information
- Full name: Dinesha Devnarain
- Born: 12 November 1988 (age 38); Durban, South Africa
- Batting: Right-handed
- Bowling: Right-arm medium
- Role: All-rounder

International information
- National side: South Africa (2008–2016)
- ODI debut (cap 52): 22 February 2008 v Ireland
- Last ODI: 15 January 2013 v West Indies
- T20I debut (cap 13): 1 August 2008 v Ireland
- Last T20I: 20 January 2013 v West Indies

Domestic team information
- Years: Team
- 2003/04–2019/20: KwaZulu-Natal Coastal

Career statistics
Competition	WODI	WT20I	WLA	WT20
Matches	29	22	156	58
Runs scored	180	100	2,291	817
Batting average	10.58	16.66	26.63	29.17
100s/50s	0/0	0/0	3/9	0/2
Top score	42	24	203*	60
Balls bowled	413	102	4,636	480
Wickets	6	1	121	23
Bowling average	57.00	130.00	21.24	18.91
5 wickets in innings	0	0	1	0
10 wickets in match	0	0	0	0
Best bowling	2/21	1/22	7/28	3/13
Catches/stumpings	4/–	1/–	56/0	6/1
- Source: CricketArchive, 23 February 2021

Dinesha Devnarain (born 12 November 1988) is a South African former cricketer who played as a right-handed batter and right-arm medium. She appeared in 29 One Day Internationals and 22 Twenty20 Internationals for South Africa between 2008 and 2016, including playing at the 2009 ICC Women's World Twenty20 and captaining the side in 2016. She played domestic cricket for KwaZulu-Natal Coastal.

She was Head Coach of Coronations for the first two seasons of the Women's T20 Super League. On 6 April 2020, she was appointed as South Africa women's U-19 head coach as well as Women's National Academy head coach.
