= Trisha Chetty =

South African cricketer (born 1988)

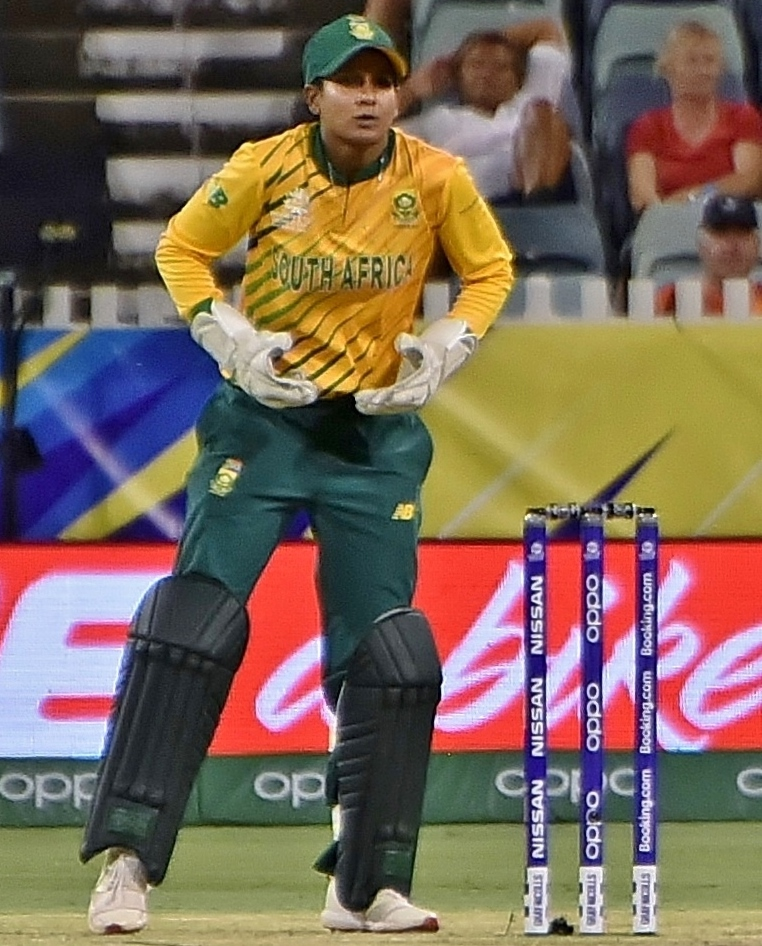
- Chetty keeping for South Africa during the 2020 ICC Women's T20 World Cup

Personal information
- Full name: Trisha Chetty
- Born: 26 June 1988 (age 38); Durban, South Africa
- Batting: Right-handed
- Role: Wicket-keeper

International information
- National side: South Africa (2007–2022)
- Test debut (cap 44): 28 July 2007 v Netherlands
- Last Test: 16 November 2014 v India
- ODI debut (cap 44): 20 January 2007 v Pakistan
- Last ODI: 18 July 2022 v England
- ODI shirt no.: 8
- T20I debut (cap 3): 10 August 2007 v New Zealand
- Last T20I: 8 June 2022 v Ireland

Domestic team information
- Years: Team
- 2003/04–2014/15: KwaZulu-Natal
- 2015/16–2017/18: Gauteng
- 2018/19: KwaZulu-Natal Inland
- 2019/20: KwaZulu-Natal Coastal

Career statistics
Competition	WTest	WODI	WT20I
Matches	2	134	82
Runs scored	93	2,703	1,117
Batting average	31.00	27.86	17.18
100s/50s	0/1	0/16	0/3
Top score	56	95	55
Catches/stumpings	2/3	133/51	42/28
- Source: ESPNcricinfo, 16 September 2022

Trisha Chetty (born 26 June 1988) is a South African former cricketer. She played two Tests, and made one hundred and twenty limited-overs appearances for South Africa between 2007 and 2022. She played as a wicket-keeper and right-handed batter. On 17 March 2023, she announced her retirement from all formats of cricket.

== Career ==
She along with Shandre Fritz set the record for the highest ever opening stand of 170 runs in the history of WT20I history She also holds the record for the highest number of dismissals by a wicketkeeper in Women's One Day International (WODIs).

In February 2018, she played in her 100th WODI match for South Africa, against India. The following month, she was one of fourteen players to be awarded a national contract by Cricket South Africa ahead of the 2018–19 season. However, in May 2018, she was dropped from South Africa's squad, ahead of their tour to England in June.

In October 2018, she was named in South Africa's squad for the 2018 ICC Women's World Twenty20 tournament in the West Indies. However, after the start of the tournament, she was ruled out of South Africa's squad due to an injury and was replaced by Faye Tunnicliffe.

In September 2019, she was named in the F van der Merwe XI squad for the inaugural edition of the Women's T20 Super League in South Africa. In January 2020, she was named in South Africa's squad for the 2020 ICC Women's T20 World Cup in Australia. On 23 July 2020, Chetty was named in South Africa's 24-woman squad to begin training in Pretoria, ahead of their tour to England.

In February 2022, she was named in South Africa's team for the 2022 Women's Cricket World Cup in New Zealand. In July 2022, she was named in South Africa's team for the cricket tournament at the 2022 Commonwealth Games in Birmingham, England. However, she was later ruled out of the tournament due to injury.
