= Sinalo Jafta =

South African cricketer (born 1994)

Personal information
- Born: 22 December 1994 (age 31); East London, South Africa
- Batting: Right-handed
- Role: Wicket-keeper

International information
- National side: South Africa (2016–present)
- Test debut (cap 61): 27 June 2022 v England
- Last Test: 15 December 2024 v England
- ODI debut (cap 77): 22 October 2016 v New Zealand
- Last ODI: 2 November 2025 v India
- T20I debut (cap 53): 15 May 2019 v Pakistan
- Last T20I: 30 November 2024 v England
- T20I shirt no.: 10

Domestic team information
- Years: Team
- 2010/11–2011/12: Border
- 2012/13–2018/19: North West
- 2014/15: Border
- 2019/20–2022/23: Western Province
- 2023/24–present: Central Gauteng

Career statistics
Competition	WTest	WODI	WT20I
Matches	4	34	55
Runs scored	36	144	138
Batting average	5.14	12.00	15.33
100s/50s	0/0	0/0	0/0
Top score	15	28*	17*
Catches/stumpings	5/–	29/2	27/9
Medal record
Women's cricket
Representing South Africa
ICC Cricket World Cup
Runner-up	2025 India
ICC T20 World Cup
Runner-up	2023 South Africa
Runner-up	2024 UAE
- Source: Cricinfo, 28 December 2024

Sinalo Jafta (born 22 December 1994) is a South African professional cricketer who plays as a wicket-keeper and right-handed batter.

== Career ==
Jafta made her Women's One Day International cricket (WODI) debut against New Zealand on 22 October 2016. In April 2019, she was named in South Africa's Women's Twenty20 International (WT20I) squad for their series against Pakistan. She made her WT20I debut for South Africa against Pakistan on 15 May 2019.

In September 2019, she was named in the Devnarain XI squad for the inaugural edition of the Women's T20 Super League in South Africa. In March 2020, she was awarded with a national contract by Cricket South Africa ahead of the 2020–21 season. On 23 July 2020, Jafta was named in South Africa's 24-woman squad to begin training in Pretoria, ahead of their tour to England.

In April 2021, she was named the as captain of the South African Emerging Women's squad that toured Bangladesh. In February 2022, she was named in South Africa's team for the 2022 Women's Cricket World Cup in New Zealand. In June 2022, Jafta was named in South Africa's Women's Test squad for their one-off match against England Women. She made her Test debut on 27 June 2022, for South Africa against England.

In July 2022, she was named in South Africa's team for the cricket tournament at the 2022 Commonwealth Games in Birmingham, England.

She was named in the South Africa squad for the 2024 ICC Women's T20 World Cup and for their multi-format home series against England in November 2024.
