= Claire Terblanche =

South African cricketer and coach (born 1984)

Personal information
- Full name: Claire Simone Terblanche
- Born: 20 October 1984 (age 42); Port Elizabeth, South Africa
- Batting: Right-handed
- Bowling: Right-arm off break
- Role: All-rounder; occasional wicket-keeper

International information
- National side: South Africa (2003–2009)
- Only Test (cap 49): 28 July 2007 v Netherlands
- ODI debut (cap 37): 13 August 2003 v England
- Last ODI: 10 March 2009 v Australia
- T20I debut (cap 11): 10 August 2007 v New Zealand
- Last T20I: 23 August 2008 v England

Domestic team information
- Years: Team
- 2003/04–2005/06: Eastern Province
- 2005/06–2007/08: Boland
- 2008/09–2016/17: Eastern Province

Career statistics
Competition	WTest	WODI	WT20I	WLA
Matches	1	21	5	117
Runs scored	56	289	34	2,569
Batting average	28.00	22.23	11.33	30.58
100s/50s	0/0	0/1	0/0	2/14
Top score	30	61	22	181
Balls bowled	108	180	–	2,052
Wickets	2	3	–	57
Bowling average	7.00	39.66	–	19.36
5 wickets in innings	0	0	–	0
10 wickets in match	0	0	–	0
Best bowling	2/11	1/4	–	4/17
Catches/stumpings	1/–	8/–	1/–	43/4
- Source: CricketArchive, 18 February 2022

Claire Simone Terblanche (born 20 October 1984) is a South African former cricketer and cricket coach. She played as a right-handed batter, right-arm off break bowler and occasional wicket-keeper. She appeared in one Test match, 21 One Day Internationals and five Twenty20 Internationals for South Africa between 2003 and 2009. She played domestic cricket for Eastern Province and Boland.

She was named as the head coach of Starlights for the inaugural season of the Women's T20 Super League, and has coached the side ever since.
