= Anneke Bosch =

South African cricketer (born 1993)

Personal information
- Full name: Anneke Elizabeth Bosch
- Born: 17 August 1993 (age 33); East London, South Africa
- Height: 170 cm (5 ft 7 in)
- Batting: Right-handed
- Bowling: Right-arm medium, Right-arm off break
- Role: All-rounder

International information
- National side: South Africa (2016–present)
- Test debut (cap 58): 27 June 2022 v England
- Last Test: 15 December 2024 v England
- ODI debut (cap 78): 18 November 2016 v Australia
- Last ODI: 2 November 2025 v India
- T20I debut (cap 56): 3 October 2019 v India
- Last T20I: 30 November 2024 v England
- T20I shirt no.: 27

Domestic team information
- Years: Team
- 2009/10–2010/11: Border
- 2011/12–2014/15: Free State
- 2015/16–2022/23: North West
- 2021/22: Brisbane Heat
- 2023/24–present: Northerns

Career statistics
Competition	WTest	WODI	WT20I
Matches	4	21	49
Runs scored	88	361	910
Batting average	12.57	24.06	26.76
100s/50s	0/0	0/2	0/5
Top score	39	65*	74*
Balls bowled	132	156	150
Wickets	3	1	8
Bowling average	35.66	134.00	23.00
5 wickets in innings	0	0	0
10 wickets in match	0	0	0
Best bowling	3/77	1/29	2/11
Catches/stumpings	3/–	8/–	15/–
Medal record
Women's cricket
Representing South Africa
ICC Cricket World Cup
Runner-up	2025 India
ICC T20 World Cup
Runner-up	2023 South Africa
Runner-up	2024 UAE
- Source: ESPNcricinfo, 28 December 2024

Anneke Elizabeth Bosch (born 17 August 1993) is a South African cricketer.

== Career ==
Bosch made her Women's One Day International cricket (WODI) debut against Australia on 18 November 2016.

In September 2019, she was named in the Terblanche XI squad for the inaugural edition of the Women's T20 Super League in South Africa. Later the same month, she was named in South Africa's Women's Twenty20 International (WT20I) squad for their series against India. She made her WT20I debut for South Africa, against India, on 3 October 2019. On 23 July 2020, Bosch was named in South Africa's 24-woman squad to begin training in Pretoria, ahead of their tour to England.

In April 2021, she was part of the South African Emerging Women's squad that toured Bangladesh. In February 2022, she was named as one of three reserves in South Africa's team for the 2022 Women's Cricket World Cup in New Zealand. In June 2022, Bosch was named in South Africa's Women's Test squad for their one-off match against England Women. She made her Test debut on 27 June 2022, for South Africa against England.

In July 2022, she was named in South Africa's team for the cricket tournament at the 2022 Commonwealth Games in Birmingham, England.

She was named in the South Africa squad for the 2024 ICC Women's T20 World Cup. Bosch scored 74 not out in the semi-final to guide her team to an eight-wicket win over Australia.

Bosch was included in the South Africa squad for their multi-format home series against England in November 2024.
