= Andrie Steyn =

South African cricketer (born 1996)

Personal information
- Full name: Andrie Steyn
- Born: 23 November 1996 (age 29); Durban, South Africa
- Height: 178 cm (5 ft 10 in)
- Batting: Right-handed
- Bowling: Right arm medium
- Role: Batter

International information
- National side: South Africa (2014–present)
- Only Test (cap 65): 27 June 2022 v England
- ODI debut (cap 72): 21 October 2014 v Sri Lanka
- Last ODI: 18 July 2022 v England
- ODI shirt no.: 6
- T20I debut (cap 38): 9 September 2014 v Ireland
- Last T20I: 26 October 2016 v Sri Lanka

Domestic team information
- Years: Team
- 2010/11–2015/16: Northerns
- 2015/16–present: Western Province

Career statistics
| Competition | WTest | WODI | WT20I |
|---|---|---|---|
| Matches | 1 | 39 | 5 |
| Runs scored | 11 | 938 | 42 |
| Batting average | 5.50 | 26.80 | 21.00 |
| 100s/50s | 0/0 | 1/6 | 0/0 |
| Top score | 8 | 117 | 35 |
| Catches/stumpings | 1/– | 12/– | 1/– |
- Source: ESPNcricinfo, 15 September 2022

Andrie Steyn (born 23 November 1996) is a South African cricketer who has played 33 One Day Internationals and five Twenty20 International for South Africa since 2014. In March 2018, she was one of fourteen players to be awarded a national contract by Cricket South Africa ahead of the 2018–19 season. In September 2019, she was named in the Devnarain XI squad for the inaugural edition of the Women's T20 Super League in South Africa. On 23 July 2020, Steyn was named in South Africa's 24-woman squad to begin training in Pretoria, ahead of their tour to England.

In April 2021, she was part of the South African Emerging Women's squad that toured Bangladesh. In August 2021, Steyn was named as the captain of the South African Emerging team for their series against Thailand.

In June 2022, Steyn was named in South Africa's Women's Test squad for their one-off match against England Women. She made her Test debut on 27 June 2022, for South Africa against England.
