= Tazmin Brits =

South African sportsperson (born 1991)

Personal information
- Born: 8 January 1991 (age 35); Klerksdorp, Transvaal (now North West), South Africa
- Nickname: Tazz
- Batting: Right-handed
- Role: Batter; occasional wicket-keeper

International information
- National side: South Africa (2018–present)
- Only Test (cap 67): 15 February 2024 v Australia
- ODI debut (cap 87): 26 January 2021 v Pakistan
- Last ODI: 4 April 2026 v New Zealand
- ODI shirt no.: 1
- T20I debut (cap 47): 19 May 2018 v Bangladesh
- Last T20I: 25 June 2026 v Bangladesh
- T20I shirt no.: 1

Domestic team information
- Years: Team
- 2004/05–2021/22: North West
- 2022/23–present: South Western Districts
- 2023: South East Stars

Career statistics
Competition	WTest	WODI	WT20I
Matches	1	57	82
Runs scored	36	1,838	2,072
Batting average	18.00	34.03	32.37
100s/50s	0/0	7/4	1/15
Top score	31	171*	114*
Catches/stumpings	0/–	21/–	30/–
Medal record
Representing South Africa
Women's cricket
ICC Cricket World Cup
Runner-up	2025 India
ICC T20 World Cup
Runner-up	2023 South Africa
Runner-up	2024 UAE
Women's javelin throw
World Junior Championships
Bronze medal – third place	2010 Moncton
African Junior Championships
Gold medal – first place	2009 Bambous
World Youth Championships
Gold medal – first place	2007 Ostrava
- Source: ESPNcricinfo, 28 December 2024

Tazmin Brits (born 8 January 1991) is a South African cricketer and former javelin thrower. She won gold in the javelin throw at the 2007 World Youth Athletics Championships and the 2009 African Junior Athletics Championships. She was in line to be selected for the 2012 London Olympics, before being involved in a road accident, which left her hospitalised for two months. She made her international debut for the South Africa women's cricket team in May 2018.

== Career ==
In April 2018, she was named in South Africa women's cricket squad for the Women's Twenty20 International (WT20I) series against Bangladesh. Prior to the tour, she captained the South Africa Emerging Players Women's squad against Australia. She made her WT20I debut for South Africa against Bangladesh Women on 19 May 2018.

In February 2019, Cricket South Africa named her as one of the players in the Powerade Women's National Academy intake for 2019. In September 2019, she was named in the F van der Merwe XI squad for the inaugural edition of the Women's T20 Super League in South Africa. In July 2020, Brits was named as the CSA Women's Provincial Cricketer of the Year. On 23 July 2020, Brits was named in South Africa's 24-woman squad to begin training in Pretoria, ahead of their tour to England.

In January 2021, she was named in South Africa's Women's One Day International (WODI) squad for their series against Pakistan. She made her WODI debut for South Africa, against Pakistan, on 26 January 2021.

In February 2022, she was named in South Africa's team for the 2022 Women's Cricket World Cup in New Zealand. In May 2022, Cricket South Africa awarded Brits with her first central contract, ahead of the 2022–23 season. In July 2022, Brits was added to South Africa's team for the cricket tournament at the 2022 Commonwealth Games in Birmingham, England. In June 2023, it was announced that she had signed to play for South East Stars in July in the 2023 Rachael Heyhoe Flint Trophy.

She was named in the South Africa squad for the 2024 ICC Women's T20 World Cup and for their multi-format home series against England in November 2024.

She has been named in the South African squad for the 2026 Women's T20 World Cup.
