= Masabata Klaas =

South African cricketer (born 1991)

Personal information
- Full name: Masabata Marie Klaas
- Born: 3 February 1991 (age 35); Botshabelo, Free State, South Africa
- Batting: Right-handed
- Bowling: Right-arm medium
- Role: Bowler

International information
- National side: South Africa (2010–present)
- Test debut (cap 69): 15 February 2024 v Australia
- Last Test: 28 June 2024 v India
- ODI debut (cap 58): 6 October 2010 v Sri Lanka
- Last ODI: 2 November 2025 v India
- ODI shirt no.: 5
- T20I debut (cap 25): 14 October 2010 v Netherlands
- Last T20I: 30 March 2024 v Sri Lanka

Domestic team information
- Years: Team
- 2006/07–2016/17: Free State
- 2017/18–2022/23: North West
- 2023/24–present: Northerns

Career statistics
| Competition | WTest | WODI | WT20I |
|---|---|---|---|
| Matches | 2 | 75 | 65 |
| Runs scored | 15 | 132 | 46 |
| Batting average | 7.50 | 5.73 | 4.18 |
| 100s/50s | 0/1 | 0/0 | 0/0 |
| Top score | 10* | 15 | 12* |
| Balls bowled | 228 | 2,866 | 1,084 |
| Wickets | 3 | 72 | 42 |
| Bowling average | 53.00 | 33.12 | 32.97 |
| 5 wickets in innings | 0 | 0 | 0 |
| 10 wickets in match | 0 | 0 | 0 |
| Best bowling | 2/96 | 4/56 | 4/21 |
| Catches/stumpings | 0/– | 14/– | 11/– |
Medal record
Women's cricket
Representing South Africa
ICC Cricket World Cup
| Runner-up | 2025 India |
ICC T20 World Cup
| Runner-up | 2023 South Africa |
- Source: ESPNcricinfo, 12 November 2024

Masabata Marie Klaas (born 3 February 1991) is a South African cricketer who plays as a right-arm medium bowler. She made her debut for South Africa in 2010.

== Career ==
In March 2018, Klaas was one of 14 players to be awarded a national contract by Cricket South Africa ahead of the 2018–19 season. In October 2018, she was named in South Africa's squad for the 2018 ICC Women's World Twenty20 tournament in the West Indies.

In May 2019, in the second WODI against Pakistan, Klass became the tenth bowler to take a hat-trick in a WODI match.

In September 2019, she was named in the Terblanche XI squad for the inaugural edition of the Women's T20 Super League in South Africa. In January 2020, she was named in South Africa's squad for the 2020 ICC Women's T20 World Cup in Australia. On 23 July 2020, Klaas was named in South Africa's 24-woman squad to begin training in Pretoria, ahead of their tour to England.

In February 2022, she was named in South Africa's team for the 2022 Women's Cricket World Cup in New Zealand. In July 2022, she was named in South Africa's team for the cricket tournament at the 2022 Commonwealth Games in Birmingham, England.

Klaas was named in the South Africa squad for the ODI part of their multi-format home series against England in November 2024.
