= Lara Goodall =

South African cricketer (born 1996)

Personal information
- Full name: Lara Goodall
- Born: 26 April 1996 (age 30); Johannesburg, South Africa
- Height: 174 cm (5 ft 9 in)
- Batting: Left-handed
- Bowling: Right-arm medium
- Role: Batter

International information
- National side: South Africa (2016–present)
- Only Test (cap 60): 27 June 2022 v England
- ODI debut (cap 76): 9 August 2016 v Ireland
- Last ODI: 17 April 2024 v Sri Lanka
- ODI shirt no.: 26
- T20I debut (cap 42): 6 March 2016 v West Indies
- Last T20I: 8 December 2023 v Bangladesh
- T20I shirt no.: 26

Domestic team information
- Years: Team
- 2011/12–present: Western Province

Career statistics
| Competition | WTest | WODI | WT20I |
|---|---|---|---|
| Matches | 1 | 50 | 21 |
| Runs scored | 36 | 838 | 280 |
| Batting average | 18.00 | 21.48 | 20.00 |
| 100s/50s | 0/0 | 0/3 | 0/1 |
| Top score | 26 | 93* | 52 |
| Catches/stumpings | 0/– | 6/– | 4/– |
Medal record
Representing South Africa
Women's Cricket
T20 World Cup
| Runner-up | 2023 South Africa |
- Source: ESPN Cricinfo, 5 October 2024

Lara Goodall (born 26 April 1996) is a South African cricketer who represents South Africa in Women's One Day Internationals and Women's Twenty20 Internationals. In February 2019, Cricket South Africa named her as one of the players in the Powerade Women's National Academy intake for 2019. In September 2019, she was named in the M van der Merwe XI squad for the inaugural edition of the Women's T20 Super League in South Africa. On 23 July 2020, Goodall was named in South Africa's 24-woman squad to begin training in Pretoria, ahead of their tour to England.

In February 2022, she was named in South Africa's team for the 2022 Women's Cricket World Cup in New Zealand. In June 2022, Goodall was named in South Africa's Women's Test squad for their one-off match against England Women. She made her Test debut on 27 June 2022, for South Africa against England. In July 2022, she was named in South Africa's team for the cricket tournament at the 2022 Commonwealth Games in Birmingham, England.

Goodall was named in the South Africa squad for the ODI part of their multi-format home series against England in November 2024.
