= Ayabonga Khaka =

South African cricketer

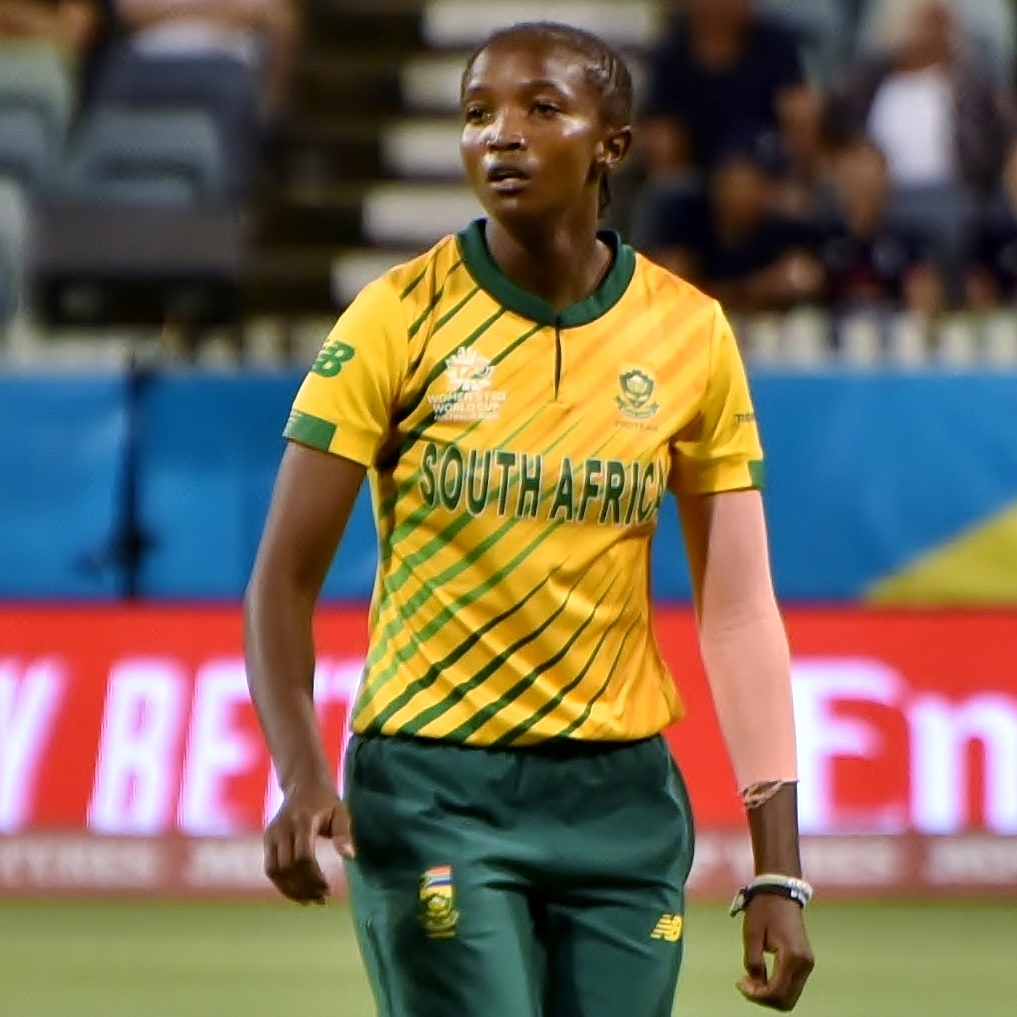
- Khaka at the 2020 T20 World Cup

Personal information
- Born: 18 July 1992 (age 34); Middledrift, Eastern Cape, South Africa
- Height: 170 cm (5 ft 7 in)
- Batting: Right-handed
- Bowling: Right-arm medium
- Role: Bowler

International information
- National side: South Africa (2012–present)
- ODI debut (cap 62): 6 September 2012 v Bangladesh
- Last ODI: 2 November 2025 v India
- ODI shirt no.: 99
- T20I debut (cap 29): 11 September 2012 v Bangladesh
- Last T20I: 20 October 2024 v New Zealand
- T20I shirt no.: 99

Domestic team information
- Years: Team
- 2007/08–2016/17: Border
- 2017/18–present: Central Gauteng
- 2020/21: Supernovas
- 2022: Velocity
- 2022: Guyana Amazon Warriors

Career statistics
Competition	WODI	WT20I
Matches	103	68
Runs scored	125	36
Batting average	4.80	12.00
100s/50s	0/0	0/0
Top score	15	8*
Balls bowled	4,861	1,373
Wickets	131	54
Bowling average	25.81	28.29
5 wickets in innings	1	0
10 wickets in match	0	0
Best bowling	5/26	4/23
Catches/stumpings	30/–	11/–
Medal record
Women's cricket
Representing South Africa
ICC Cricket World Cup
Runner-up	2025 India
ICC T20 World Cup
Runner-up	2023 South Africa
Runner-up	2024 UAE
- Source: ESPNcricinfo, 21 October 2024

Ayabonga Khaka (born 18 July 1992) is a South African cricketer who plays for the national cricket team as a right-arm medium bowler.

== Early life and education ==
Khaka was born and raised in Middledrift (also Middeldrift or Ixesi), near Alice in Eastern Cape. Her first experience of cricket was playing it in the streets of her home town. She started playing the game formally while in grade 1 at Ingwenya Primary School. That year, at the age of seven, she became the only girl in the boys mini cricket team.

Right from the beginning, Khaka preferred bowling to batting, as she was less likely to be hit by the ball, and it was challenging, especially against boys. She took particular pleasure in getting boys out. Another reason she liked cricket is that it involved a lot of discipline.

Khaka continued playing mini cricket until she was 14, because no other choices were available to her, and she did not know about women's cricket. Then she started at Ntabenkonyana Senior Secondary School, where not much cricket was played. She therefore quit playing cricket, and took up soccer. The following year, when she was in grade 9, she resumed playing cricket, this time for Middledrift Women's Cricket Club.

Eventually, Khaka had to choose between cricket and football. She opted for cricket because she enjoyed it more. While playing at Middledrift Women's Cricket Club, she was selected for the Border Under 19 girls' team, and also played simultaneously for the senior provincial team. In 2009, she was selected for the national Under 19 team.

Khaka spent much of her early career working with former men's national team fast bowler Mfuneko Ngam at the cricket academy of the University of Fort Hare in Alice. As of 2020, she was studying Human Movement Sciences at the university.

== Career ==
Khaka made her debut for the national team in September 2012 against Bangladesh. In May 2018, she took her 50th wicket in Women's One Day Internationals (WODIs), during the series against Bangladesh.

In September 2019, she was named in the F van der Merwe XI squad for the inaugural edition of the Women's T20 Super League in South Africa. In January 2020, she was named in South Africa's squad for the 2020 ICC Women's T20 World Cup in Australia. On 23 July 2020, Khaka was named in South Africa's 24-woman squad to begin training in Pretoria, ahead of their tour to England.

In January 2022, in the second match against the West Indies, Khaka took her first five-wicket haul in WODIs, with 5 for 26. In February 2022, she was named in South Africa's team for the 2022 Women's Cricket World Cup in New Zealand. In South Africa's first match of the tournament, against Bangladesh, Khaka took her 100th wicket in WODI cricket.

In May 2022, Khaka played for the Spirit team in the privately run 2022 FairBreak Invitational T20 in Dubai, United Arab Emirates. On 8 May 2022, she bagged the tournament's first five-wicket haul, by taking 5/9 against the Sapphires. She was also awarded player of the match. At the end of the Invitational, she was included in the Team of the Tournament, after taking a total of nine wickets.

In June 2022, Khaka was named in South Africa's Women's Test squad for their one-off match against England Women. In July 2022, she was named in South Africa's team for the cricket tournament at the 2022 Commonwealth Games in Birmingham, England. In August 2022, she was signed as an overseas player for Guyana Amazon Warriors for the inaugural edition of the Women's Caribbean Premier League.

She was named in the South Africa squad for the 2024 ICC Women's T20 World Cup and for the ODI part of their multi-format home series against England in November 2024.
