= Delmi Tucker =

South African cricketer

Personal information
- Born: 5 March 1997 (age 29); Pretoria, South Africa
- Height: 159 cm (5 ft 3 in)
- Batting: Right-handed
- Bowling: Right-arm off-break
- Role: Batting all-rounder

International information
- National side: South Africa
- Test debut (cap 70): 15 February 2024 v Australia
- Last Test: 28 June 2024 v India
- ODI debut (cap 88): 11 June 2022 v Ireland
- Last ODI: 17 April 2024 v Sri Lanka
- T20I debut (cap 57): 21 July 2022 v England
- Last T20I: 8 December 2023 v Bangladesh

Domestic team information
- Years: Team
- 2012/13–2018/19: Northerns
- 2019/20: North West
- 2021/22–present: Western Province

Career statistics
Competition	WTest	WODI	WT20I
Matches	2	10	14
Runs scored	64	64	50
Batting average	16.00	16.00	8.33
100s/50s	0/1	0/0	0/0
Top score	64	25	15*
Balls bowled	254	299	168
Wickets	3	4	3
Bowling average	76.00	62.00	63.66
5 wickets in innings	0	0	0
10 wickets in match	0	0	0
Best bowling	2/141	1/6	1/14
Catches/stumpings	1/–	2/–	2/–
Medal record
Representing South Africa
Women's Cricket
T20 World Cup
Runner-up	2023 South Africa
- Source: Cricinfo, 9 October 2024

Delmi Tucker (born 5 March 1997) is a South African cricketer who plays for Western Province, Duchesses and South Africa. She made her international debut for South Africa in June 2022.

== Career ==
Tucker attended Hoërskool Menlopark school in Pretoria, where she played hockey and cricket. Tucker went on to play hockey for Northerns, before turning her focus to cricket.

Tucker was part of the South Africa Emerging squad that played against Zimbabwe in May 2021. He all-round performance helped South Africa take an unassailable 3–0 lead in the five-match series. In September 2021, Tucker was again named in the South Africa Emerging squad, this time to play eight matches against Thailand during their tour of South Africa and Zimbabwe.

In May 2022, Tucker earned her maiden call-up to the national team for their tour to Ireland. She was named in South Africa's Women's One Day International (WODI) and Women's Twenty20 International (WT20I) squads following a strong performance in domestic cricket, where she had scored more than 400 runs and taken 15 wickets. Tucker made her WODI debut on 11 June 2022, for South Africa against Ireland, however she was not required to bat or bowl. Tucker made her WT20I debut on 21 July 2022, also during South Africa's series against England. Also in July 2022, Tucker was added to South Africa's team for the cricket tournament at the 2022 Commonwealth Games in Birmingham, England.
