= Tumi Sekhukhune =

South African cricketer

Personal information
- Full name: Tumi Sphindile Sekhukhune
- Born: 21 November 1998 (age 27); Johannesburg, South Africa
- Nickname: Stumza
- Batting: Left-handed
- Bowling: Right-arm medium
- Role: Bowler
- Relatives: Kabelo Sekhukhune (cousin)

International information
- National side: South Africa (2018–present)
- Test debut (cap 64): 27 June 2022 v England
- Last Test: 28 June 2024 v India
- ODI debut (cap 83): 16 September 2018 v West Indies
- Last ODI: 2 November 2025 v India
- T20I debut (cap 50): 24 September 2018 v West Indies
- Last T20I: 20 September 2024 v Pakistan
- T20I shirt no.: 12

Domestic team information
- Years: Team
- 2012/13–2017/18: Easterns
- 2018/19–2020/21: North West
- 2021/22–present: Central Gauteng

Career statistics
Competition	WTest	WODI	WT20I
Matches	2	26	37
Runs scored	49	25	6
Batting average	49.00	4.16	3.00
100s/50s	0/0	0/0	0/0
Top score	33*	6*	3
Balls bowled	210	1,106	639
Wickets	2	22	38
Bowling average	73.50	39.13	19.36
5 wickets in innings	0	0	0
10 wickets in match	0	0	0
Best bowling	1/70	2/20	3/20
Catches/stumpings	0/–	5/–	15/–
Medal record
Women's cricket
Representing South Africa
ICC Cricket World Cup
Runner-up	2025 India
ICC T20 World Cup
Runner-up	2024 UAE
- Source: Cricinfo, 15 October 2024

Tumi Sphindile Sekhukhune (born 21 November 1998) is a South African cricketer who plays as a right-arm fast-medium bowler. She made her international debut for South Africa in September 2018.

== Career ==
In August 2018, she was named in the South Africa Women's squad for their series against the West Indies Women. She made her Women's One Day International cricket (WODI) debut for South Africa against West Indies Women on 16 September 2018. She made her Women's Twenty20 International cricket (WT20I) debut for South Africa against West Indies Women on 24 September 2018.

In October 2018, she was named in South Africa's squad for the 2018 ICC Women's World Twenty20 tournament in the West Indies. In February 2019, Cricket South Africa named her as one of the players in the Powerade Women's National Academy intake for 2019. In August 2019, she was named the International Women's Newcomer of the Year at Cricket South Africa's annual awards ceremony.

In September 2019, she was named in the Devnarain XI squad for the inaugural edition of the Women's T20 Super League in South Africa. In January 2020, she was named in South Africa's squad for the 2020 ICC Women's T20 World Cup in Australia. On 23 July 2020, Sekhukhune was named in South Africa's 24-woman squad to begin training in Pretoria, ahead of their tour to England.

In February 2022, she was named in South Africa's team for the 2022 Women's Cricket World Cup in New Zealand. In June 2022, Sekhukhune was named in South Africa's Women's Test squad for their one-off match against England Women. She made her Test debut on 27 June 2022, for South Africa against England. In July 2022, she was named in South Africa's team for the cricket tournament at the 2022 Commonwealth Games in Birmingham, England. However, she was later ruled out of the tournament due to injury.

She was named in the South Africa squad for the 2024 ICC Women's T20 World Cup and for the T20 part of their multi-format home series against England in November 2024.
