= Nadine de Klerk =

South African cricketer (born 2000)

Personal information
- Born: 16 January 2000 (age 26); Pretoria, South Africa
- Height: 163 cm (5 ft 4 in)
- Batting: Right-handed
- Bowling: Right-arm medium
- Role: All-rounder

International information
- National side: South Africa (2017–present)
- Test debut (cap 59): 27 June 2022 v England
- Last Test: 15 December 2024 v England
- ODI debut (cap 79): 9 May 2017 v India
- Last ODI: 2 November 2025 v India
- T20I debut (cap 44): 13 February 2018 v India
- Last T20I: 23 June 2025 v West Indies
- T20I shirt no.: 32

Domestic team information
- Years: Team
- 2013/14–2018/19: Northerns
- 2019/20–present: Western Province
- 2020/21–2024/25: Brisbane Heat
- 2023–2024: The Blaze
- 2023: Oval Invincibles
- 2024: Royal Challengers Bengaluru
- 2025: Mumbai Indians
- 2026- present: Royal Challengers Bengaluru
- 2026/27: Sydney Thunder

Career statistics
Competition	WTest	WODI	WT20I
Matches	4	52	68
Runs scored	114	813	660
Batting average	16.28	23.91	27.50
100s/50s	0/1	0/3	0/0
Top score	61	84*	44*
Balls bowled	481	2,053	1,022
Wickets	4	62	51
Bowling average	82.00	27.67	24.54
5 wickets in innings	0	0	0
10 wickets in match	0	0	0
Best bowling	2/96	4/32	3/7
Catches/stumpings	1/–	17/–	14/–
Medal record
Women's cricket
Representing South Africa
ICC Cricket World Cup
Runner-up	2025 India
ICC T20 World Cup
Runner-up	2023 South Africa
Runner-up	2024 UAE
- Source: ESPNcricinfo, 10 October 2025

Nadine de Klerk (born 16 January 2000) is a South African international cricketer who plays for South Africa national cricket team in all formats of the game. She also plays for the Royal Challengers Bengaluru in the Women's Premier League and has appeared in other franchise leagues. She is a right-handed batter and right-arm medium bowler.

== Career ==
De Klerk made her Women's One Day International cricket (WODI) debut against India in the 2017 South Africa Quadrangular Series on 9 May 2017. She made her Women's Twenty20 International cricket (WT20I) debut for South Africa against India on 13 February 2018.

In February 2019, Cricket South Africa named her as one of the players in the Powerade Women's National Academy intake for 2019. In September 2019, she was named in the F van der Merwe XI squad for the inaugural edition of the Women's T20 Super League in South Africa. In January 2020, she was named in South Africa's squad for the 2020 ICC Women's T20 World Cup in Australia.

In March 2020, she was awarded with a national contract by Cricket South Africa ahead of the 2020–21 season. On 23 July 2020, de Klerk was named in South Africa's 24-woman squad to begin training in Pretoria, ahead of their tour to England.

In February 2022, she was named as one of three reserves in South Africa's team for the 2022 Women's Cricket World Cup in New Zealand. In June 2022, de Klerk was named in South Africa's Women's Test squad for their one-off match against England Women. She made her Test debut on 27 June 2022, for South Africa against England.

In July 2022, she was named in South Africa's team for the cricket tournament at the 2022 Commonwealth Games in Birmingham, England. In March 2023, it was announced that de Klerk had signed for The Blaze for the upcoming English domestic season.

She was named in the South Africa squad for the 2024 ICC Women's T20 World Cup and for their multi-format home series against England in November 2024.

De Klerk represented South Africa at the 2025 World Cup. In the group stage match against India she scored an unbeaten 84 from 54 balls to lead her side to a three-wicket victory.
