= Nonkululeko Mlaba =

South African cricketer (born 2000)

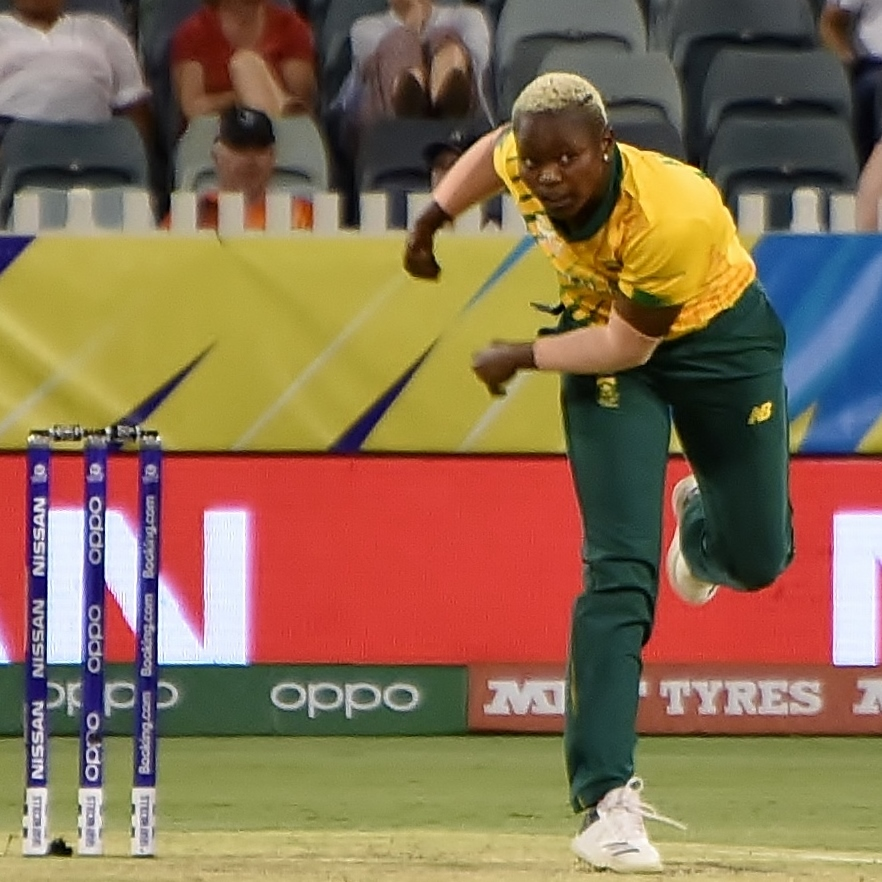
- Mlaba at the 2020 T20 World Cup

Personal information
- Born: 27 June 2000 (age 26); Durban KwaZulu-Natal, South Africa
- Nickname: Lefty
- Height: 167 cm (5 ft 6 in)
- Batting: Right-handed
- Bowling: Slow left-arm orthodox
- Role: Bowler

International information
- National side: South Africa (2019–present)
- Test debut (cap 63): 27 June 2022 v England
- Last Test: 28 June 2024 v India
- ODI debut (cap 86): 20 January 2021 v Pakistan
- Last ODI: 2 November 2025 v India
- T20I debut (cap 55): 24 September 2019 v India
- Last T20I: 27 November 2024 v England
- T20I shirt no.: 28

Domestic team information
- Years: Team
- 2015/16–present: KwaZulu-Natal Coastal

Career statistics
Competition	WTest	WODI	WT20I
Matches	3	26	60
Runs scored	32	20	16
Batting average	8.00	2.85	4.00
100s/50s	0/0	0/0	0/0
Top score	15	9	5*
Balls bowled	493	1,242	1,153
Wickets	3	21	50
Bowling average	109.66	46.47	24.26
5 wickets in innings	0	0	0
10 wickets in match	0	0	0
Best bowling	2/74	3/39	4/29
Catches/stumpings	0/–	10/–	4/–
Medal record
Women's cricket
Representing South Africa
ICC Cricket World Cup
Runner-up	2025 India
ICC T20 World Cup
Runner-up	2023 South Africa
Runner-up	2024 UAE
- Source: Cricinfo, 28 November 2024

Nonkululeko Mlaba (born 27 June 2000) is a South African cricketer who plays as a slow left-arm orthodox bowler. She made her international debut for the South Africa women's cricket team in September 2019.

== Career ==
In September 2019, she was named in South Africa's squad for their series against India. She made her Women's Twenty20 International (WT20I) debut for South Africa, against India, on 24 September 2019. In January 2020, she was named in South Africa's Women's One Day International (WODI) squad for their series against New Zealand. Later the same month, she was named in South Africa's squad for the 2020 ICC Women's T20 World Cup in Australia.

In July 2020, Mlaba was named newcomer of the year at Cricket South Africa's annual awards ceremony. By 23 July 2020, Mlaba was named in South Africa's 24-woman squad to begin training in Pretoria, ahead of their tour to England.

In January 2021, she was named in South Africa's Women's One Day International (WODI) squad for their series against Pakistan. She made her WODI debut for South Africa, against Pakistan, on 20 January 2021.

In February 2022, she was named in South Africa's team for the 2022 Women's Cricket World Cup in New Zealand. In May 2022, Cricket South Africa awarded Mlaba with her first central contract, ahead of the 2022–23 season. In June 2022, Mlaba was named in South Africa's Women's Test squad for their one-off match against England Women. She made her Test debut on 27 June 2022, for South Africa against England. In July 2022, she was named in South Africa's team for the cricket tournament at the 2022 Commonwealth Games in Birmingham, England.

She achieved a remarkable milestone as the first South African women cricketer to record a 10 wicket haul in a test match when South Africa played a once-off test in December 2024 against England.

She was named in the South Africa squad for the 2024 ICC Women's T20 World Cup and for their multi-format home series against England in November 2024. During the 2024 ICC Women's T20 World Cup she recorded her international T20 career best against the West Indies of 4/29. South Africa were runner-ups in that tournament.
