= Women's T20 Super League =

- Countries: South Africa
- Administrator: Cricket South Africa
- Format: Twenty20
- First edition: 2019
- Latest edition: 2022–23
- Tournament format: Double round-robin
- Number of teams: 4
- Most successful: Coronations (2 titles)

The Women's T20 Super League is a women's domestic Twenty20 cricket tournament organised by Cricket South Africa. The tournament began in September 2019, with four teams taking part; these teams were renamed for a second competition in December 2019. The third competition took place in December 2020, which was won by Coronations. The competition took place again in December 2022, with no overall winner crowned due to the number of matches abandoned due to rain.

The tournament aims to give more game time and competition for South Africa's best women players, with players organised into teams and playing matches at the same ground over a weekend.

== History ==
The tournament began in 2019, conceived as a way of giving the best South African women cricketers more game time and more competitive cricket. The first tournament took place over a weekend in September 2019, with four teams playing each other once. The four teams were named after their coaches: Dinesha Devnarain, Martelize van der Merwe, Francois van der Merwe and Claire Terblanche, with the Devnarain XI winning all of their matches to win the title.

The second edition of the tournament took place later that year, in December 2019. The competition retained the same format, but the teams were renamed: Devnarain XI becoming Coronations, Terblanche XI becoming Starlights, F van der Merwe XI becoming Thistles and M van der Merwe XI becoming Duchesses. Starlights, Duchesses and Coronations all won two matches each, with Starlights triumphing on Net Run Rate.

The third edition of the Super League took place in December 2020, with a Virtual Draft taking place before the tournament to allocate players. Coronations won their second title (and first under their new name), winning two matches and edging out runners-up Thistles on Net Run Rate.

The tournament returned in December 2022 for its fourth edition, with a South Africa Under-19 team replacing Duchesses in the four-team competition. With five matches abandoned due to rain, no overall winner was crowned. Starlights finished top of the group standings, winning all of their completed matches.

== Teams ==
Team	Previous name	First	Last	Titles
Coronations	Devnarain XI	2019	2022–23	2
Duchesses	M van der Merwe XI	2019	2020–21	0
South Africa Under-19s	–	2022–23	2022–23	0
Starlights	Terblanche XI	2019	2022–23	1
Thistles	F van der Merwe XI	2019	2022–23	0

== Results ==
Season	1st	2nd	3rd	4th	Ref
2019	Devnarain XI	M van der Merwe XI	F van der Merwe XI	Terblanche XI	
2019–20	Starlights	Coronations	Duchesses	Thistles	
2020–21	Coronations	Thistles	Starlights	Duchesses	
2022–23	Starlights (Note: Despite finishing top of the table, Starlights were not crowned champions due to the lack of matches completed due to rain.)	Coronations	Thistles	South Africa Under-19s	
