= 2011 Indoor Cricket World Cup =

2011 cricket event

- Logo of the 2011 Indoor Cricket World Cup
- Administrator: World Indoor Cricket Federation
- Cricket format: Indoor Cricket
- Tournament format(s): Round-robin and Knockout
- Host: South Africa
- Champions: Australia (men); Australia (women)
- Participants: 7 (men); 5 (women)
- Matches: 36 (men); 25 (women)
- Player of the series: (New Zealand) Matthew Henderson (men) (South Africa) Hilda Nienaber (women)
- Most runs: (England) Clinton McCabe (217) (men) (South Africa) Kirsten Blair (211) (women)
- Most wickets: (South Africa) Marius Lubbe (22) (men) (South Africa) Hilda Nienaber (25) (women)
- Official website: Action Sports Website

The 2011 Indoor Cricket World Cup was the tenth edition of Indoor Cricket World Cup which took place between 9 and 15 October 2011 in Gauteng, South Africa.

Some divisions comprising the Junior World Series of Indoor Cricket took place alongside this event.

== Host Selection ==
The World Cup was awarded to South Africa by the WICF at the conclusion of the previous World Cup. As a result, South Africa became the third nation to host the World Cup twice, having previously hosted the 2000 Indoor Cricket World Cup in Johannesburg.

=== Venue ===
South African administrators determined that Fourways Action Sports Arena in Gauteng would host all World Cup matches and Johannesburg became the host city as a result.

== Participants ==
Men's Open

- Australia
- England
- India
- New Zealand
- South Africa
- South Africa Development
- Sri Lanka

Ladies Open

- Australia
- England
- South Africa
- South Africa Development
- Wales

== Men's Open ==
=== Format ===
In the initial phase, the 7 teams will play a round-robin tournament whereby each team plays each one of the other teams once. After 6 games, the table splits into two sections of four teams (Top 4) and three teams (Bottom 3), with each team playing each other in their section. After the second round-robin, a finals phase is played: single-elimination bracket for Bottom 3 teams, and Page playoff bracket for Top 4.

Group stage points are awarded as follows:
Win: 3 points + Bonus points.
Tied: 1.5 points + Bonus points.
Loss: Bonus points.
Bonus points: 1 point for each skin won, regardless of match result.

=== Group stage ===
- Source

Team	Pld	W	T	L	Diff.	S	Pts
Australia	9	8	0	1	473	29	53
South Africa	9	7	0	2	241	23	44
New Zealand	9	6	0	3	199	22	40
South Africa Development	9	3	0	6	-122	13	22
Sri Lanka	8	3	0	5	-58	14	23
England	8	1	0	7	-329	11	14
India	8	2	0	6	-404	8	14

9 October 2011	Sri Lanka; 116 (2)	v	England; 86 (2)	Sri Lanka won by 30 runs
09:00; Scoresheet	Sri Lanka; 116 (2)	v	England; 86 (2)	Player of the match: (Sri Lanka) Dilshan Vitharana
09:00; Scoresheet	Nishad Liyanage 27, Chrishantha Pieris 27; Sean Ongers 4/-4		Clinton McCabe 21; Dilshan Vitharana 5/-12	Player of the match: (Sri Lanka) Dilshan Vitharana
Points: Sri Lanka 5, England 2.				Player of the match: (Sri Lanka) Dilshan Vitharana

9 October 2011	South Africa; 76 (2)	v	South Africa Development; 57 (2)	South Africa won by 19 runs
09:00; Scoresheet	South Africa; 76 (2)	v	South Africa Development; 57 (2)
09:00; Scoresheet	Neil Burger 15, Stephan Le Roux 15; Alwyn Viljoen 4/-8		Vaughn van Berkel 24; Neil Burger 3/-3, Stephan Le Roux 3/0, Marius Lubbe 3/2
Points: South Africa 5, South Africa Development 2.

9 October 2011	India; 46 (0)	v	Australia; 146 (4)	Australia won by 100 runs
11:15; Scoresheet	India; 46 (0)	v	Australia; 146 (4)
11:15; Scoresheet	Himmat Singh 15; Michael Ledgard 3/-3, Vinesh Bennett 3/-2, Rhys Dearness 3/1		Michael Spargo 34; Yathish Channappa 3/2
Points: Australia 7, India 0.

9 October 2011	South Africa; 84 (4)	v	India; 24 (0)	South Africa won by 60 runs
15:45; Scoresheet	South Africa; 84 (4)	v	India; 24 (0)
15:45; Scoresheet	Marius Lubbe 28; Amarinder Bhinder 4/4		Abhijit Venkatesh 11; Breaan Spies 4/-11
Points: South Africa 7, India 0.

9 October 2011	Sri Lanka; 71 (0)	v	New Zealand; 139 (4)	New Zealand won by 68 runs
15:45; Scoresheet	Sri Lanka; 71 (0)	v	New Zealand; 139 (4)
15:45; Scoresheet	Chrishantha Pieris 23; Leigh Kelly 3/-4		Robert Sheary 29; Nishad Liyanage 1/12, Niranjan Rajapakse 1/13, Sanjaya Gangodawila 1/20
Points: New Zealand 7, Sri Lanka 0.

9 October 2011	England; 42 (0)	v	Australia; 134 (4)	Australia won by 92 runs
18:00; Scoresheet	England; 42 (0)	v	Australia; 134 (4)
18:00; Scoresheet	Michiel Bester 13, Clinton McCabe 13; Vinesh Bennett 3/-3, Lyle Teske 3/-1, Michael Spargo 3/6		Michael Ledgard 29; Blake van der Linde 2/14
Points: Australia 7, England 0.

9 October 2011	South Africa Development; 73 (0)	v	New Zealand; 114 (4)	New Zealand won by 41 runs
20:15; Scoresheet	South Africa Development; 73 (0)	v	New Zealand; 114 (4)
20:15; Scoresheet	Ryk Eksteen 14, Vaughn van Berkel 14; Leigh Kelly 4/-9		Matthew Henderson 21; Craig Currin 2/9
Points: New Zealand 7, South Africa Development 0.

10 October 2011	Sri Lanka; 95 (2)	v	South Africa Development; 96 (2)	South Africa Development won by 1 run
09:00; Scoresheet	Sri Lanka; 95 (2)	v	South Africa Development; 96 (2)
09:00; Scoresheet	Kolitha Nayanananda 20; Morne Swart 3/0		Andre Venter 23; Dilshan Vitharana 4/6
Points: South Africa Development 5, Sri Lanka 2.

10 October 2011	Sri Lanka; 44 (1)	v	South Africa; 111 (3)	South Africa won by 67 runs
13:30; Scoresheet	Sri Lanka; 44 (1)	v	South Africa; 111 (3)
13:30; Scoresheet	Madhawa Warnapura 17; Junior Dala 4/-9		Christopher de Freitas 19, Breaan Spies 19; Sachindra Gonaduwa 2/7, Ruwan Chandrakumar 2/14
Points: South Africa 6, Sri Lanka 1.

10 October 2011	New Zealand; 46 (1)	v	Australia; 116 (3)	Australia won by 70 runs
13:30; Scoresheet	New Zealand; 46 (1)	v	Australia; 116 (3)
13:30; Scoresheet	Tim Papps 22; Vinesh Bennett 4/-12		Nick de Grys 21; Jon Routhan 2/3, Scott Alexander 2/9
Points: Australia 6, New Zealand 1.

10 October 2011	England; 92 (1)	v	India; 100 (3)	India won by 8 runs
13:30; Scoresheet	England; 92 (1)	v	India; 100 (3)
13:30; Scoresheet	Adam Breakspear 22; Nishant Singh 3/2		Nishant Singh 21; Adam Breakspear 4/-9
Points: India 6, England 1.

10 October 2011	England; 83 (1)	v	New Zealand; 167 (3)	New Zealand won by 84 runs
18:00; Scoresheet	England; 83 (1)	v	New Zealand; 167 (3)
18:00; Scoresheet	Ian Leach 33; Leigh Kelly 5/-14		Michael Barry 28; Blake van der Linde 1/16, Jason Thomson 1/19
Points: New Zealand 6, England 1.

10 October 2011	Australia; 104 (2)	v	South Africa; 95 (2)	Australia won by 9 runs
20:15; Scoresheet	Australia; 104 (2)	v	South Africa; 95 (2)
20:15; Scoresheet	Ty Hopes 20; Breaan Spies 2/5		Quintin Lubbe 20; Rob Fitzgerald 2/1, Lyle Teske 2/15
Points: Australia 5, South Africa 2.

10 October 2011	South Africa Development; 108 (3)	v	India; 97 (1)	South Africa Development won by 11 runs
20:15; Scoresheet	South Africa Development; 108 (3)	v	India; 97 (1)
20:15; Scoresheet	Ryk Eksteen 24; Bharath Kalkur 2/6, Nishant Singh 2/15		Nishant Singh 24; Ryk Eksteen 2/2, Wesley Lowe 2/8, Kevin Vermaak 2/22
Points: South Africa Development 6, India 1.

11 October 2011	India; 44 (0)	v	New Zealand; 160 (4)	New Zealand won by 116 runs
09:00; Scoresheet	India; 44 (0)	v	New Zealand; 160 (4)	Player of the match: (New Zealand) Tim Papps
09:00; Scoresheet	Mahesh AS 13; Tim Papps 5/-10		Tim Papps 31; Nishant Singh 1/15, Abhijit Venkatesh 1/16, Himmat Singh 1/16	Player of the match: (New Zealand) Tim Papps
Points: New Zealand 7, India 0.				Player of the match: (New Zealand) Tim Papps

11 October 2011	South Africa; 94 (2)	v	England; 76 (2)	South Africa won by 18 runs
11:15; Scoresheet	South Africa; 94 (2)	v	England; 76 (2)	Player of the match: (England) Clinton McCabe
11:15; Scoresheet	Kevin van Rensburg 20; Sean Ongers 3/4		Clinton McCabe 35; George Viviers 4/-7, Yergesh Naidoo 4/-4	Player of the match: (England) Clinton McCabe
Points: South Africa 5, England 2.				Player of the match: (England) Clinton McCabe

11 October 2011	Sri Lanka; 79 (1)	v	Australia; 143 (3)	Australia won by 64 runs
11:15; Scoresheet	Sri Lanka; 79 (1)	v	Australia; 143 (3)	Player of the match: (Australia) Tim Wichura
11:15; Scoresheet	Chrishantha Pieris 24; Tim Wichura 4/-6		Lance MacDougall 26; Chrishantha Pieris 1/11, Niranjan Rajapakse 1/18, Amila Ratnayake 1/19, Kolitha Nayanananda 1/21	Player of the match: (Australia) Tim Wichura
Points: Australia 6, Sri Lanka 1.				Player of the match: (Australia) Tim Wichura

11 October 2011	South Africa Development; 151 (3)	v	England; 41 (1)	South Africa Development won by 110 runs
15:45; Scoresheet	South Africa Development; 151 (3)	v	England; 41 (1)	Player of the match: (South Africa) Vaughn van Berkel
15:45; Scoresheet	Vaughn van Berkel 33; Sean Ongers 2/11, Adam Breakspear 2/12		Clinton McCabe 16; Alwyn Viljoen 4/-5, Kevin Vermaak 4/-4, Craig Currin 4/-2	Player of the match: (South Africa) Vaughn van Berkel
Points: South Africa Development 6, England 1.				Player of the match: (South Africa) Vaughn van Berkel

11 October 2011	Sri Lanka; 127 (3)	v	India; 51 (1)	Sri Lanka won by 76 runs
18:00; Scoresheet	Sri Lanka; 127 (3)	v	India; 51 (1)	Player of the match: (Sri Lanka) Ruwan Chandrakumar
18:00; Scoresheet	Kolitha Nayanananda 28; Nishant Singh 3/3		Nishant Singh 28; Ruwan Chandrakumar 5/-15	Player of the match: (Sri Lanka) Ruwan Chandrakumar
Points: Sri Lanka 6, India 1.				Player of the match: (Sri Lanka) Ruwan Chandrakumar

11 October 2011	South Africa Development; 55 (1)	v	Australia; 127 (3)	Australia won by 72 runs
20:15; Scoresheet	South Africa Development; 55 (1)	v	Australia; 127 (3)	Player of the match: (Australia) Jarred Leach
20:15; Scoresheet	Wesley Lowe 18; Jarred Leach 3/-4, Michael Spargo 3/4		Vinesh Bennett 25; Kevin Vermaak 2/4	Player of the match: (Australia) Jarred Leach
Points: Australia 6, South Africa Development 1.				Player of the match: (Australia) Jarred Leach

11 October 2011	South Africa; 85 (2)	v	New Zealand; 91 (2)	New Zealand won by 6 runs
20:15; Scoresheet	South Africa; 85 (2)	v	New Zealand; 91 (2)	Player of the match: (New Zealand) Marius Lubbe
20:15; Scoresheet	Junior Dala 17; Nicholas Ward 3/5		Matthew Henderson 25; Marius Lubbe 5/-16	Player of the match: (New Zealand) Marius Lubbe
Points: New Zealand 5, South Africa 2.				Player of the match: (New Zealand) Marius Lubbe

Bottom 3

12 October 2011	Sri Lanka; 99 (2)	v	India; 100 (2)	India won by 1 run
15:45; Scoresheet	Sri Lanka; 99 (2)	v	India; 100 (2)	Player of the match: (Sri Lanka) Ruwan Chandrakumar
15:45; Scoresheet	Niranjan Rajapakse 21; Himmat Singh 3/4		Nishant Singh 27; Amila Ratnayake 4/-8	Player of the match: (Sri Lanka) Ruwan Chandrakumar
Points: India 5, Sri Lanka 2.				Player of the match: (Sri Lanka) Ruwan Chandrakumar

13 October 2011	Sri Lanka; 147 (3)	v	England; 110 (1)	Sri Lanka won by 37 runs
11:15; Scoresheet	Sri Lanka; 147 (3)	v	England; 110 (1)	Player of the match: (Sri Lanka) Ruwan Chandrakumar
11:15; Scoresheet	Ruwan Chandrakumar 22, Niranjan Rajapakse 22; Anish Patel 2/29		Clinton McCabe 31; Kamal Kuruppu 4/3	Player of the match: (Sri Lanka) Ruwan Chandrakumar
Points: Sri Lanka 6, England 1.				Player of the match: (Sri Lanka) Ruwan Chandrakumar

13 October 2011	England; 175 (3)	v	India; 125 (1)	England won by 50 runs
15:45; Scoresheet	England; 175 (3)	v	India; 125 (1)	Player of the match: (England) Ian Leach
15:45; Scoresheet	Clinton McCabe 27; Nishant Singh 2/3		Yathish Channappa 26; Ian Leach 5/-8	Player of the match: (England) Ian Leach
Points: England 6, India 1.				Player of the match: (England) Ian Leach

Top 4

12 October 2011	Australia; 110 (4)	v	New Zealand; 62 (0)	Australia won by 48 runs
18:00; Scoresheet	Australia; 110 (4)	v	New Zealand; 62 (0)	Player of the match: (Australia) Vinesh Bennett
18:00; Scoresheet	Jarred Leach 20; Leigh Kelly 4/2		Stacy Hyndman 20; Vinesh Bennett 3/-4, Jarred Leach 3/1	Player of the match: (Australia) Vinesh Bennett
Points: Australia 7, New Zealand 0.				Player of the match: (Australia) Vinesh Bennett

12 October 2011	South Africa; 113 (3)	v	South Africa Development; 62 (1)	South Africa won by 51 runs
20:15; Scoresheet	South Africa; 113 (3)	v	South Africa Development; 62 (1)	Player of the match: Yergesh Naidoo (South Africa)
20:15; Scoresheet	Neil Burger 25; Wesley Lowe 3/-5		Sylvester Pretorius 25; Yergesh Naidoo 4/-9, Kevin van Rensburg 4/-9	Player of the match: Yergesh Naidoo (South Africa)
Points: South Africa 6, South Africa Development 1.				Player of the match: Yergesh Naidoo (South Africa)

13 October 2011	South Africa; 83 (2)	v	Australia; 70 (2)	South Africa won by 13 runs
09:00; Scoresheet	South Africa; 83 (2)	v	Australia; 70 (2)	Player of the match: (Australia) Michael Spargo
09:00; Scoresheet	Breaan Spies 16; Jarred Leach 2/-1, Michael Spargo 2/6		Michael Spargo 21; Dennis Howland 4/-2	Player of the match: (Australia) Michael Spargo
Points: South Africa 5, Australia 2.				Player of the match: (Australia) Michael Spargo

13 October 2011	South Africa Development; 98 (1)	v	New Zealand; 128 (3)	New Zealand won by 30 runs
11:15; Scoresheet	South Africa Development; 98 (1)	v	New Zealand; 128 (3)	Player of the match: (New Zealand) Matthew Henderson
11:15; Scoresheet	Craig Currin 23; Matthew Henderson 4/-1		Robert Sheary 27; Alwyn Viljoen 2/6, Morne Swart 2/16	Player of the match: (New Zealand) Matthew Henderson
Points: New Zealand 6, South Africa Development 1.				Player of the match: (New Zealand) Matthew Henderson

13 October 2011	Australia; 92 (4)	v	South Africa Development; 61 (0)	Australia won by 31 runs
18:00; Scoresheet	Australia; 92 (4)	v	South Africa Development; 61 (0)	Player of the match: (Australia) Travis Baker
18:00; Scoresheet	Travis Baker 17; Morne Swart 2/2, Andre Venter 2/3, Nicky van der Merwe 2/5		Sylvester Pretorius 14, Dalton Smalberger 14; Nick de Grys 3/-5, Travis Baker 3/0, Michael Ledgard 3/15	Player of the match: (Australia) Travis Baker
Points: Australia 7, South Africa Development 0.				Player of the match: (Australia) Travis Baker

13 October 2011	South Africa; 81 (3)	v	New Zealand; 53 (1)	South Africa won by 28 runs
20:15; Scoresheet	South Africa; 81 (3)	v	New Zealand; 53 (1)	Player of the match: (South Africa) Stephan Le Roux
20:15; Scoresheet	Stephan Le Roux 21; Craig Elliot 3/-5, Michael Barry 3/-4		Brendon Donkers 17; Stephan Le Roux 5/-12	Player of the match: (South Africa) Stephan Le Roux
Points: South Africa 6, New Zealand 1.				Player of the match: (South Africa) Stephan Le Roux

=== Finals ===
==== Bottom 3 ====
Bottom 3 Playoff			Bottom 3 Plate Final
			5	Sri Lanka	126 (2)
6	England	115 (2)	6	England	124 (2)
7	India	91 (2)

14 October 2011	England; 115 (2)	v	India; 91 (2)	England won by 24 runs
18:00; Scoresheet	England; 115 (2)	v	India; 91 (2)	Player of the match: (England) Adam Breakspear
18:00; Scoresheet	Sean Ongers 23; Bharath Kalkur 3/2		Himmat Singh 23; Adam Breakspear 3/-6, Ian Leach 3/3	Player of the match: (England) Adam Breakspear
England advances to Plate Final.				Player of the match: (England) Adam Breakspear

15 October 2011	England; 124 (2)	v	Sri Lanka; 126 (2)	Sri Lanka won by 2 runs
08:00; Scoresheet	England; 124 (2)	v	Sri Lanka; 126 (2)	Player of the match: (England) Clinton McCabe
08:00; Scoresheet	Russell Ongers 24; Kolitha Nayanananda 2/14		Kamal Kuruppu 30; Clinton McCabe 2/8, Blake van der Linde 2/11	Player of the match: (England) Clinton McCabe
Sri Lanka wins the Plate.				Player of the match: (England) Clinton McCabe

==== Top 4 ====
Quarterfinals
1	Australia	81 (2)
2	South Africa	33 (2)
3	New Zealand	104 (1)
4	South Africa Dev.	105 (3)

Semifinal
2	South Africa	70 (2)
4	South Africa Dev.	65 (2)

Final
1	Australia	94 (2)
2	South Africa	55 (2)

14 October 2011	Australia; 81 (2)	v	South Africa; 33 (2)	Australia won by 48 runs
13:30 Quarterfinal Scoresheet	Australia; 81 (2)	v	South Africa; 33 (2)	Player of the match: (South Africa) Neil Burger
13:30 Quarterfinal Scoresheet	Vinesh Bennett 30; Neil Burger 4/-11		Yergesh Naidoo 22; Ty Hopes 4/-7, Lyle Teske 4/-7	Player of the match: (South Africa) Neil Burger
Australia advances to Grand Final. South Africa drops to Semifinal.				Player of the match: (South Africa) Neil Burger

14 October 2011	South Africa Development; 105 (3)	v	New Zealand; 104 (1)	South Africa Development won by 1 run
13:30 Quarterfinal Scoresheet	South Africa Development; 105 (3)	v	New Zealand; 104 (1)	Player of the match: (South Africa) Morne Swart
13:30 Quarterfinal Scoresheet	Morne Swart 20, Andre Venter 20; Stacy Hyndman 3/-1		Michael Barry 25; Sylvester Pretorius 3/-6, Morne Swart 3/-2	Player of the match: (South Africa) Morne Swart
South Africa Development advances to Semifinal. New Zealand is eliminated.				Player of the match: (South Africa) Morne Swart

14 October 2011	South Africa; 70 (2)	v	South Africa Development; 65 (2)	South Africa won by 5 runs
18:00 Semifinal Scoresheet	South Africa; 70 (2)	v	South Africa Development; 65 (2)	Player of the match: Andre Venter (South Africa Development)
18:00 Semifinal Scoresheet	Stephan Le Roux 19; Andre Venter 3/-3, Vaughn van Berkel 3/-2		Ryk Eksteen 20; Junior Dala 3/-7, Peter McDonald 3/-4	Player of the match: Andre Venter (South Africa Development)
South Africa advances to Grand Final. South Africa Development is eliminated.				Player of the match: Andre Venter (South Africa Development)

15 October 2011	Australia; 94 (2)	v	South Africa; 55 (2)	Australia won by 39 runs
14:45 Grand Final Scoresheet	Australia; 94 (2)	v	South Africa; 55 (2)	Player of the match: (Australia) Jarred Leach
14:45 Grand Final Scoresheet	Vinesh Bennett 24; Quintin Lubbe 2/3, George Viviers 2/4, Marius Lubbe 2/8		Marius Lubbe 22; Lyle Teske 4/-7	Player of the match: (Australia) Jarred Leach
Australia wins 2014 Indoor Cricket World Cup Men's Open.				Player of the match: (Australia) Jarred Leach

== Ladies Open ==
=== Format ===
In the initial phase, the 5 teams will play a round-robin tournament whereby each team plays each one of the other teams twice. After 8 games, a play-off system resembling 2002-08 Super League Top Six format is played.

Group stage points are awarded as follows:
Win: 3 points + Bonus points.
Tied: 1.5 points + Bonus points.
Loss: Bonus points.
Bonus points: 1 point for each skin won, regardless of match result.

=== Group stage ===
- Source

Team	Pld	W	T	L	Diff.	S	Pts
Australia	8	8	0	0	807	28	52
South Africa	8	6	0	2	682	24	42
South Africa Development	8	3	0	5	-241	13	22
Wales	8	3	0	5	-473	9	18
England	8	0	0	8	-775	6	6

9 October 2011	Wales; 4 (0)	v	Australia; 136 (4)	Australia won by 132 runs
11:15; Scoresheet	Wales; 4 (0)	v	Australia; 136 (4)
11:15; Scoresheet	Rebecca Williams 12; Jude Coleman 7/-27		Katrina Teske 26; Jackie Hawker 1/10, Alex Hales 1/10, Rebecca Struthers 1/13, Hannaa Zaman 1/15, Marsh Davies 1/18
Points: Australia 7, Wales 0.

9 October 2011	South Africa; 130 (3)	v	South Africa Development; 92 (1)	South Africa won by 38 runs
13:30; Scoresheet	South Africa; 130 (3)	v	South Africa Development; 92 (1)
13:30; Scoresheet	Kirsten Blair 27; Maggie Cocklin 2/8, Amy Bathgate 2/13, Chantal Botha 2/18		Leanie Scheepers 19; Kirsten Blair 3/3
Points: South Africa 6, South Africa Development 1.

9 October 2011	South Africa Development; 148 (3)	v	England; 76 (1)	South Africa Development won by 72 runs
18:00; Scoresheet	South Africa Development; 148 (3)	v	England; 76 (1)
18:00; Scoresheet	Kayleigh Tapp 31; Rachel Scholes 2/8		Alison Foxwell 24; Hayleigh Wheeler 4/-12
Points: South Africa Development 6, England 1.

9 October 2011	Australia; 108 (2)	v	South Africa; 101 (2)	Australia won by 7 runs
20:15; Scoresheet	Australia; 108 (2)	v	South Africa; 101 (2)
20:15; Scoresheet	Amy Wills 23; Hanri Strydom 2/7, Bennita van der Merwe 2/10		Kirsten Blair 22; Melissa Mayers 2/2, Wendy Kemp 2/5, Nicole Martin 2/10
Points: Australia 5, South Africa 2.

10 October 2011	South Africa; 149 (4)	v	England; 50 (0)	South Africa won by 99 runs
11:15; Scoresheet	South Africa; 149 (4)	v	England; 50 (0)
11:15; Scoresheet	Hanri Strydom 23; Katherine Adie 2/13		Alison Foxwell 17; Hilda Nienaber 4/-6
Points: South Africa 7, England 0.

10 October 2011	South Africa Development; 125 (3)	v	Wales; 140 (1)	Wales won by 15 runs
11:15; Scoresheet	South Africa Development; 125 (3)	v	Wales; 140 (1)
11:15; Scoresheet	Amy Bathgate 27; Sarvi Razavi 3/5		Rebecca Struthers 25, Rebecca Williams 25; Michelle Homann 2/9
Points: Wales 4, South Africa Development 3.

10 October 2011	South Africa; 160 (3)	v	Wales; 3 (1)	South Africa won by 157 runs
15:45; Scoresheet	South Africa; 160 (3)	v	Wales; 3 (1)
15:45; Scoresheet	Kirsten Blair 32, Lucy Neto 32; Jackie Hawker 4/-7		Sarvi Razavi 19; Hilda Nienaber 4/-9, Karen Momberg 4/-7
Points: South Africa 6, Wales 1

10 October 2011	Australia; 160 (4)	v	England -23 (0)	Australia won by 183 runs
18:00; Scoresheet	Australia; 160 (4)	v	England -23 (0)
18:00; Scoresheet	Elizabeth Hall 28; Charlotte Walker 1/11, Ruth Barron 1/16, Katherine Adie 1/18, Alison Foxwell 1/19, Sarah Fogwill 1/19, Abbey Hawkins 1/19		Alison Foxwell 18; Jude Coleman 5/-21
Points: Australia 7, England 0.

11 October 2011	South Africa; 122 (3)	v	South Africa Development; 47 (1)	South Africa won by 75 runs
13:30; Scoresheet	South Africa; 122 (3)	v	South Africa Development; 47 (1)	Player of the match: Bennita van der Merwe (South Africa)
13:30; Scoresheet	Hilda Nienaber 25; Amy Bathgate 2/10		Michelle Homann 20; Bennita van der Merwe 6/-21	Player of the match: Bennita van der Merwe (South Africa)
Points: South Africa 6, South Africa Development 1.				Player of the match: Bennita van der Merwe (South Africa)

11 October 2011	Wales; 62 (0)	v	Australia; 166 (4)	Australia won by 104 runs
13:30; Scoresheet	Wales; 62 (0)	v	Australia; 166 (4)	Player of the match: (Australia) Rikki-Lee Rimmington
13:30; Scoresheet	Alex Hales 19; Rikki-Lee Rimmington 4/-8		Briony Polkinghorne 29; Marsh Davies 2/27	Player of the match: (Australia) Rikki-Lee Rimmington
Points: Australia 7, Wales 0.				Player of the match: (Australia) Rikki-Lee Rimmington

11 October 2011	Australia; 150 (4)	v	South Africa Development -2 (0)	Australia won by 152 runs
18:00; Scoresheet	Australia; 150 (4)	v	South Africa Development -2 (0)	Player of the match: (Australia) Rebecca Cook
18:00; Scoresheet	Briony Polkinghorne 22, Rikki-Lee Rimmington 22, Amy Wills 22; Amy Bathgate 1/13, Leanie Scheepers 1/21		Chantal Botha 17; Rebecca Cook 5/-20, Briony Polkinghorne 5/-12	Player of the match: (Australia) Rebecca Cook
Points: Australia 7, South Africa Development 0.				Player of the match: (Australia) Rebecca Cook

11 October 2011	England; 90 (1)	v	Wales; 102 (3)	Wales won by 12 runs
20:15; Scoresheet	England; 90 (1)	v	Wales; 102 (3)	Player of the match: (England) Lisa Pagett
20:15; Scoresheet	Lisa Pagett 18, Abbey Hawkins 18; Hannaa Zaman 3/2		Danielle Peart 26; Lisa Pagett 3/-7	Player of the match: (England) Lisa Pagett
Points: Wales 6, England 1.				Player of the match: (England) Lisa Pagett

12 October 2011	Australia; 141 (3)	v	England; 65 (1)	Australia won by 76 runs
13:30; Scoresheet	Australia; 141 (3)	v	England; 65 (1)	Player of the match: (Australia) Melissa Mayers
13:30; Scoresheet	Melissa Mayers 26, Nicole Martin 26; Lisa Pagett 1/7, Rachel Scholes 1/15, Ceara Toal 1/18, Jennifer Wilson 1/25, Emily Marriott 1/35		Emily Marriott 18; Nicole Martin 3/7, Briony Polkinghorne 3/9	Player of the match: (Australia) Melissa Mayers
Points: Australia 6, England 1.				Player of the match: (Australia) Melissa Mayers

12 October 2011	South Africa; 195 (4)	v	Wales; 49 (0)	South Africa won by 146 runs
13:30; Scoresheet	South Africa; 195 (4)	v	Wales; 49 (0)	Player of the match: (South Africa) Mari Taljaard
13:30; Scoresheet	Hilda Nienaber 31, Hanri Strydom 31; Hannaa Zaman 1/15, Danielle Peart 1/20		Rebecca Williams 19; Mari Taljaard 6/-18	Player of the match: (South Africa) Mari Taljaard
Points: South Africa 7, Wales 0.				Player of the match: (South Africa) Mari Taljaard

12 October 2011	South Africa Development; 133 (3)	v	England; 69 (1)	South Africa Development won by 64 runs
18:00; Scoresheet	South Africa Development; 133 (3)	v	England; 69 (1)	Player of the match: (South Africa) Michelle Homann
18:00; Scoresheet	Kayleigh Tapp 26; Ceara Toal 2/4, Jennifer Wilson 2/6, Rachel Scholes 2/7		Emily Marriott 20; Michelle Homann 3/-1, Chantal Botha 3/0	Player of the match: (South Africa) Michelle Homann
Points: South Africa Development 6, England 1.				Player of the match: (South Africa) Michelle Homann

12 October 2011	South Africa; 101 (1)	v	Australia; 120 (3)	Australia won by 19 runs
20:15; Scoresheet	South Africa; 101 (1)	v	Australia; 120 (3)	Player of the match: (Australia) Neisha Iles
20:15; Scoresheet	Lucy Neto 21; Neisha Iles 3/0, Elizabeth Hall 3/3		Neisha Iles 22, Jude Coleman 22; Hilda Nienaber 2/5, Nicola Nel 2/9	Player of the match: (Australia) Neisha Iles
Points: Australia 6, South Africa 1.				Player of the match: (Australia) Neisha Iles

13 October 2011	England; 36 (2)	v	Wales; 112 (2)	Wales won by 76 runs
09:00; Scoresheet	England; 36 (2)	v	Wales; 112 (2)	Player of the match: (Wales) Rebecca Williams
09:00; Scoresheet	Katherine Adie 16; Rebecca Struthers 5/-11		Moira Comfort 26; Alison Foxwell 2/3, Emily Marriott 2/7	Player of the match: (Wales) Rebecca Williams
Points: Wales 5, England 2.				Player of the match: (Wales) Rebecca Williams

13 October 2011	Australia; 145 (4)	v	South Africa Development; 11 (0)	Australia won by 134 runs
11:15; Scoresheet	Australia; 145 (4)	v	South Africa Development; 11 (0)	Player of the match: (Australia) Rebecca Cook
11:15; Scoresheet	Jude Coleman 35; Kayleigh Tapp 2/1		Hayleigh Wheeler 18; Katrina Teske 4/-7	Player of the match: (Australia) Rebecca Cook
Points: Australia 7, South Africa Development 0.				Player of the match: (Australia) Rebecca Cook

13 October 2011	Wales; 67 (2)	v	South Africa Development; 104 (2)	South Africa Development won by 37 runs
15:45; Scoresheet	Wales; 67 (2)	v	South Africa Development; 104 (2)	Player of the match: (South Africa) Amy Bathgate
15:45; Scoresheet	Moira Comfort 25; Amy Bathgate 4/-3		Amy Bathgate 21; Hannaa Zaman 2/12, Rebecca Struthers 2/13, Sarvi Razavi 2/18	Player of the match: (South Africa) Amy Bathgate
Points: South Africa Development 5, Wales 2.				Player of the match: (South Africa) Amy Bathgate

13 October 2011	England -11 (0)	v	South Africa; 182 (4)	South Africa won by 193 runs
20:15; Scoresheet	England -11 (0)	v	South Africa; 182 (4)	Player of the match: (South Africa) Hilda Nienaber
20:15; Scoresheet	Emily Marriott 6 Hilda Nienaber 6/-25		Hilda Nienaber 32	Player of the match: (South Africa) Hilda Nienaber
Points: South Africa 7, England 0.				Player of the match: (South Africa) Hilda Nienaber

=== Finals ===
Eliminator
Wales	99 (4)
England	63 (0)

Semi-finals
Australia	107 (2)
South Africa	91 (2)
South Africa Dev.	105 (2)
Wales	87 (2)

Preliminary final
South Africa	106 (3)
South Africa Dev.	35 (1)

Grand final
Australia	66 (2)
South Africa	33 (2)

14 October 2011	England; 63 (0)	v	Wales; 99 (4)	Wales won by 36 runs
11:15 Play-off Scoresheet	England; 63 (0)	v	Wales; 99 (4)	Player of the match: (Wales) Rebecca Williams
11:15 Play-off Scoresheet	Alison Foxwell 20; Hannaa Zaman 4/-8		Rebecca Williams 36; Alison Foxwell 4/-4	Player of the match: (Wales) Rebecca Williams
Wales advances to Quarterfinal.				Player of the match: (Wales) Rebecca Williams

14 October 2011	Australia; 107 (2)	v	South Africa; 91 (2)	Australia won by 16 runs
11:15 Quarterfinal Scoresheet	Australia; 107 (2)	v	South Africa; 91 (2)	Player of the match: (South Africa) Hanri Strydom
11:15 Quarterfinal Scoresheet	Briony Polkinghorne 24; Hanri Strydom 3/-3		Hanri Strydom 24; Melissa Mayers 3/2, Wendy Kemp 3/3	Player of the match: (South Africa) Hanri Strydom
Australia advances to Grand Final. South Africa drops to Semifinal.				Player of the match: (South Africa) Hanri Strydom

14 October 2011	South Africa Development; 105 (2)	v	Wales; 87 (2)	South Africa Development won by 18 runs
15:45 Quarterfinal Scoresheet	South Africa Development; 105 (2)	v	Wales; 87 (2)	Player of the match: (Wales) Rebecca Williams
15:45 Quarterfinal Scoresheet	Simone Cronje 24; Rebecca Williams 4/-3		Jackie Hawker 20; Maggie Cocklin 4/-5	Player of the match: (Wales) Rebecca Williams
South Africa Development advances to Semifinal.				Player of the match: (Wales) Rebecca Williams

14 October 2011	South Africa; 106 (3)	v	South Africa Development; 35 (1)	South Africa won by 71 runs
20:15 Semifinal Scoresheet	South Africa; 106 (3)	v	South Africa Development; 35 (1)	Player of the match: Celeste Rennie (South Africa)
20:15 Semifinal Scoresheet	Bennita van der Merwe 24, Nikki de Carvalho 24; Chantal Botha 4/-4		Amy Bathgate 17; Celeste Rennie 7/-28	Player of the match: Celeste Rennie (South Africa)
South Africa advances to Grand Final.				Player of the match: Celeste Rennie (South Africa)

15 October 2011	South Africa; 33 (2)	v	Australia; 66 (2)	Australia won by 33 runs
12:30 Grand Final Scoresheet	South Africa; 33 (2)	v	Australia; 66 (2)	Player of the match: (Australia) Amy Wills
12:30 Grand Final Scoresheet	Kirsten Blair 15, Celeste Rennie 15; Wendy Kemp 4/-3		Amy Wills 18; Hanri Strydom 3/-3, Lucy Neto 3/14	Player of the match: (Australia) Amy Wills
Australia wins 2011 Indoor Cricket World Cup Ladies Open				Player of the match: (Australia) Amy Wills

== See also ==
- Indoor Cricket World Cup
