= 2009 Indoor Cricket World Cup =

Cricket event

- Logo of the 2009 Indoor Cricket World Cup
- Administrator: World Indoor Cricket Federation
- Cricket format: Indoor Cricket
- Tournament format(s): Round-robin and Knockout
- Host: Australia
- Champions: Australia (men); Australia (women)
- Participants: 5 (men); 5 (women)
- Matches: 24 (men); 24 (women)
- Player of the series: (Australia) Lyle Teske (men) (Australia) Melissa Mayers (women)
- Most runs: (South Africa) Stef Le Roux (146) (men) (South Africa) Hanri Strydom (178) (women)
- Most wickets: (South Africa) Marius Lubbe (23) (men) (Australia) Judith Coleman (22) (women)
- Official website: Cricket Australia Website

The 2009 Indoor Cricket World Cup was the ninth edition of the tournament and took place between 11 and 17 October 2009 in Brisbane, Australia. The event is notable as the first international indoor cricket event to take place there since the merger of Indoor Cricket Australia and Cricket Australia.

Australian Cricket hall of fame member and former test cricketer Ian Healy served as ambassador for the event.

The 2009 Junior World Series of Indoor Cricket took place alongside this event.

== Host Selection ==
The World Cup was awarded to Australia by the WICF at the conclusion of the previous World Cup. As a result, Australia became the second nation to host the World Cup twice, having hosted the 1998 Indoor Cricket World Cup at the Glass House in Melbourne.

As the national body for both traditional cricket and indoor cricket, Cricket Australia is the first unified national body to host an international indoor cricket event.

=== Venue ===
Cricket Australia determined that Brisbane West Indoor Sports Centre in Darra, Brisbane would host all World Cup matches and Brisbane became the host city as a result. Cricket Australia relocated the 2009 Australian Open Indoor Cricket Championships from Campbelltown to Brisbane to serve as a test event for the new venue.

== Media coverage ==
=== Television ===
Cricket Australia has arranged for limited delayed telecast of the finals series on Fox Sports in Australia. This represents the first mainstream television coverage of an Indoor Cricket event (international or otherwise) in a decade. Fox Sports will broadcast highlights packages for the finals series and will broadcast the Men's final in full approximately two weeks after the conclusion of the tournament.

=== Online Coverage ===
Cricket Australia provided online coverage including news and results on the official World Cup Website. Action Sports South Africa provided full results details (including scoresheets and statistics) on their website.

A number of players, officials and spectators also provided coverage for friends and members of the public via social networking sites such as Facebook and Twitter.

== Participants ==
Men's Division

- Australia
- England
- New Zealand
- South Africa
- Sri Lanka

India and Pakistan were also entered in the Men's division but were forced to withdraw just days before the commencement of the tournament due to issues entering Australia. The withdrawal was at such short notice that the tournament program still contains the team listings and player photographs for both sides, and includes the original draw featuring their matches.

Women's Division

- Australia
- England
- New Zealand
- South Africa
- Wales

== Round Robin tournament ==
=== Day One ===
The entirety of day one was a "ticketed session" in that only ticket holders were allowed into the venue. The theme for the day was "Trans Tasman Day" and featured Australia vs New Zealand in the evening match.

Men's Division

11 October 2009
(scoresheet)

| South Africa; 135 (4) | v | Sri Lanka; 11 (0) |
| Ryk Eksteen (25); Neil Burger (4/-10) | | Tharindu Mendis (11); Sachindra Gonaduwa (2/4) |

South Africa won by 124 runs

11 October 2009
(scoresheet)

| England; 25 (0) | v | Australia; 145 (4) |
| Simon Roberts (19); Daniel Tucker (2/9) | | Lee Irwin (29); Lee Irwin (3/-9) |

Australia won by 120 runs

11 October 2009
(scoresheet)

| New Zealand; 97 (2) | v | England; 61 (2) |
| Bryce Fellows (19), Leigh Kelly (19); Sunnie Chan (2/-2) | | Sean Ongers (13); Chris Guest (3/0) |

New Zealand won by 36 runs

11 October 2009
(scoresheet)

| New Zealand; 83 (1) | v | Australia; 94 (3) |
| Tim Papps (19), Bryce Fellows (19), Scott Davies (19); Nigel Collins (3/-3) | | Troy Gurski (18); Ty Hopes (2/0) |

Australia won by 11 runs

11 October 2009
(scoresheet)

| South Africa; 112 (3) | v | England; 63 (1) |
| Alex Nel (25); Nestus Bosman (3/-6) | | Blake van de Linde (21); Wayne Kylander (3/2) |

South Africa won by 49 runs

Ladder at conclusion of Day One

| Team | Pld | W | T | L | S | % | Pts |
|---|---|---|---|---|---|---|---|
| South Africa | 2 | 2 | 0 | 0 | 7 | 333.78 | 13 |
| Australia | 2 | 2 | 0 | 0 | 7 | 221.30 | 13 |
| New Zealand | 2 | 1 | 0 | 1 | 3 | 116.13 | 6 |
| England | 3 | 0 | 0 | 3 | 3 | 42.09 | 3 |
| Sri Lanka | 1 | 0 | 0 | 1 | 0 | 8.15 | 0 |

Women's Division

11 October 2009
(scoresheet)

| England; 9 (0) | v | Australia; 134 (4) |
| Abbey Hawkins (20); Abbey Hawkins (2/6) | | Rikki Lee Rimmington (26), Neisha Iles (26); Judith Coleman (6/-21) |

Australia won by 125 runs

11 October 2009
(scoresheet)

| South Africa; 168 (4) | v | Wales; 32 (0) |
| Celeste Rennie (31); Hanri Strydom (4/-12) | | Laura Boorman (15); Moira Comfort (1/12) |

South Africa won by 136 runs

11 October 2009
(scoresheet)

| New Zealand; 53 (0) | v | Australia; 165 (4) |
| Tori Burbery (19); Natasha Williams (1/21) | | Olivia Magno (26); Judith Coleman (3/-7) |

Australia won by 112 runs

11 October 2009
(scoresheet)

| England; 94 (2) | v | Wales; 88 (2) |
| Kate Dicken (16); Ceara Toal (3/3) | | Laura Boorman (18); Moira Comfort (2/1) |

England won by 6 runs

Ladder at conclusion of Day One

| Team | Pld | W | T | L | S | % | Pts |
|---|---|---|---|---|---|---|---|
| Australia | 2 | 2 | 0 | 0 | 8 | 482.26 | 14 |
| South Africa | 1 | 1 | 0 | 0 | 4 | 525.00 | 7 |
| England | 2 | 1 | 0 | 1 | 2 | 46.39 | 5 |
| Wales | 2 | 0 | 0 | 2 | 0 | 45.80 | 2 |
| New Zealand | 1 | 0 | 0 | 1 | 0 | 32.12 | 0 |

=== Day Two ===
The evening session on was ticketed and in keeping with the theme of "Aussie Juniors Night" featured few matches from the open divisions and instead focused on the simultaneously run 2009 Junior World Series of Indoor Cricket. Most open matches therefore took place whilst free entry to the venue was permitted.

Men's Division

12 October 2009
(scoresheet)

| Sri Lanka; 77 (2) | v | England; 101 (2) |
| Tharindu Mendia (21); Ruwan Chandra Kumara (3/1) | | Sean Ongers (23); Adam Breakspear (3/-4) |

England won by 24 runs

12 October 2009
(scoresheet)

| South Africa; 53 (0) | v | Australia; 128 (4) |
| Stef Le Roux (18); Renato De Almeida (3/-2) | | Lyle Teske (29); Daniel McLauchlan (3/-1) |

Australia won by 70 runs

Ladder at conclusion of Day Two

| Team | Pld | W | T | L | S | % | Pts |
|---|---|---|---|---|---|---|---|
| Australia | 3 | 3 | 0 | 0 | 11 | 224.84 | 20 |
| South Africa | 3 | 2 | 0 | 1 | 7 | 152.28 | 13 |
| England | 4 | 1 | 0 | 3 | 5 | 58.00 | 8 |
| New Zealand | 2 | 1 | 0 | 1 | 3 | 116.13 | 6 |
| Sri Lanka | 2 | 0 | 0 | 2 | 2 | 37.29 | 2 |

Women's Division

12 October 2009
(scoresheet)

| Australia; 161 (4) | v | Wales; 40 (0) |
| Wendy Kemp (27); Rikki-Lee Rimmington (3/-2) | | Laura Boorman (18 runs); Laura Boorman (1/12), Becky Williams (1/12) |

Australia won by 121 runs

12 October 2009
(scoresheet)

| South Africa; 129 (2) | v | New Zealand; 127 (2) |
| Hilda Nienaber (27); Nicola Nel (2/8) | | Lea Tahuhu (33); Michelle Lynch (3/11) |

South Africa won by 2 runs

12 October 2009
(scoresheet)

| England; 54 (0) | v | South Africa; 213 (4) |
| Laura Owen (18), Beth Howe (18); Ceara Toal (1/11) | | Hanri Strydom (44); Hanri Strydom (3/-5), Karen Momberg (3/-5) |

South Africa won by 159 runs

12 October 2009
(scoresheet)

| Wales; 57 (0) | v | New Zealand; 168 (4) |
| Laura Boorman (21); Marsha Davies (2/17) | | Kimberly Minogue (31); Sarah White (6/-15) |

New Zealand won by 111 runs

Ladder at conclusion of Day Two

| Team | Pld | W | T | L | S | % | Pts |
|---|---|---|---|---|---|---|---|
| Australia | 3 | 3 | 0 | 0 | 12 | 450.98 | 21 |
| South Africa | 3 | 3 | 0 | 0 | 10 | 239.44 | 19 |
| New Zealand | 3 | 1 | 0 | 2 | 6 | 99.71 | 9 |
| England | 3 | 1 | 0 | 2 | 2 | 36.09 | 5 |
| Wales | 4 | 0 | 0 | 4 | 2 | 36.55 | 2 |

=== Day Three ===
Day three featured both free and ticketed matches. The theme of "Ashes Night" saw Australia take on England in the ticketed evening session, whilst the daytime games were held during free admission periods.

Men's Division

13 October 2009
(scoresheet)

| New Zealand; 96 (4) | v | South Africa; 59 (0) |
| Brendan Donkers (15), Stacey Hyndman (15), Nigel Collins (15); Leigh Kelly (4/-5) | | Marius Lubbe (23); Marius Lubbe (2/0) |

New Zealand won by 37 runs

13 October 2009
(scoresheet)

| Australia; 154 (4) | v | Sri Lanka; 12 (0) |
| Dilshan Witharana (19); Sachindra Gonaduwa (2/10) | | Darren Richards (24), Robert Fitzgerald (24); Vinesh Bennett (3/-6), Ty Hopes (3/-6) |

Australia won by 142 runs

13 October 2009
(scoresheet)

| New Zealand; 148 (4) | v | Sri Lanka; 31 (0) |
| Bryce Fellows (31); Bryce Fellows (5/-17) | | Tharindu Mendia (12); Sachindra Gonaduwa (1/17) |

New Zealand won by 108 runs

13 October 2009
(scoresheet)

| England; 24 (1) | v | Australia; 122 (3) |
| Russell Ongers (18); Adam Breakspear (2/11) | | Lee Irwin (21); Chris Boyce (4/-8) |

Australia won by 98 runs

13 October 2009
(scoresheet)

| Sri Lanka; 39 (0) | v | South Africa; 143 (4) |
| Ruwan Chandra Kumara (18); Madhuranga Wijesekera (2/5) | | Liaan van Niekerk (27); Marius Lubbe (6/-22) |

South Africa won by 104 runs

Ladder at conclusion of Day Three

| Team | Pld | W | T | L | S | % | Pts |
|---|---|---|---|---|---|---|---|
| Australia | 5 | 5 | 0 | 0 | 18 | 323.86 | 33 |
| South Africa | 5 | 3 | 0 | 2 | 11 | 151.20 | 20 |
| New Zealand | 4 | 3 | 0 | 1 | 11 | 166.93 | 20 |
| England | 5 | 1 | 0 | 4 | 6 | 49.55 | 9 |
| Sri Lanka | 5 | 0 | 0 | 5 | 2 | 26.28 | 2 |

Women's Division

13 October 2009
(scoresheet)

| South Africa; 113 (0) | v | Australia; 155 (4) |
| Benita vd Merwe (24); Hilda Nienaber (1/15) | | Amy Wills (26); Olivia Magno (4/-13) |

Australia won by 42 runs

13 October 2009
(scoresheet)

| England; 106 (0) | v | New Zealand; 163 (4) |
| Alison Foxhall (21), Beth Howe (21); Beth Howe (2/14) | | Sarah White (29); Jess Little (3/-1), Lea Tahuhu (3/-1) |

New Zealand won by 57 runs

13 October 2009
(scoresheet)

| Australia; 176 (4) | v | England; 22 (0) |
| Amy Wills (28); Nicole Martin (5/-16) | | Beth Howe (16); Ceara Toal (1/14) |

Australia won by 154 runs

13 October 2009
(scoresheet)

| Wales; 74 (1) | v | South Africa; 157 (3) |
| Becky Williams (28); Sarah Ginn (2/13) | | Nicola Nel (28); Dominique de Carvalho (4/-3) |

South Africa won by 83 runs

Ladder at conclusion of Day Three

| Team | Pld | W | T | L | S | % | Pts |
|---|---|---|---|---|---|---|---|
| Australia | 5 | 5 | 0 | 0 | 19 | 330.96 | 34 |
| South Africa | 5 | 4 | 0 | 1 | 14 | 176.87 | 26 |
| New Zealand | 4 | 2 | 0 | 2 | 10 | 112.25 | 16 |
| England | 5 | 1 | 0 | 4 | 2 | 36.82 | 5 |
| Wales | 5 | 0 | 0 | 5 | 3 | 38.77 | 3 |

=== Day Four ===
Day four featured both free and ticketed matches. The theme of "Green and Gold Rivalry Night" saw Australia take on South Africa in the ticketed evening session, whilst the daytime games were during free admission periods.

Men's Division

14 October 2009
(scoresheet)

| New Zealand; 51 (0) | v | Australia; 118 (4) |
| Tim Papps (15); Scott Davies (2/9) | | Daniel McLauchlan (22); Lance Macdougall (4/-7) |

Australia won by 67 runs

14 October 2009
(scoresheet)

| England; 90 (3) | v | South Africa; 74 (1) |
| Sean Ongers (28); Adam Breakspear (4/-7) | | Egbert Lubbe (27); Marius Lubbe (3/-1) |

England won by 16 runs

14 October 2009
(scoresheet)

| New Zealand; 126 (2) | v | England; 87 (2) |
| Stacey Hyndman (26); Scott Davies (6/-7) | | Simon Roberts (22); Adam Breakspear (1/8) |

New Zealand won by 39 runs

14 October 2009
(scoresheet)

| Australia; 69 (3) | v | South Africa; 39 (1) |
| Lee Irwin (20); Daniel McLauchlan (4/-15) | | Ryk Eksteen (21); Egbert Lubbe (4/-11) |

Australia won by 30 runs

Ladder at conclusion of Day Four

| Team | Pld | W | T | L | S | % | Pts |
|---|---|---|---|---|---|---|---|
| Australia | 7 | 7 | 0 | 0 | 25 | 287.46 | 46 |
| New Zealand | 6 | 4 | 0 | 2 | 13 | 133.56 | 25 |
| South Africa | 7 | 3 | 0 | 4 | 13 | 125.25 | 22 |
| England | 7 | 2 | 0 | 5 | 11 | 59.89 | 17 |
| Sri Lanka | 5 | 0 | 0 | 5 | 2 | 26.28 | 2 |

Women's Division

14 October 2009
(scoresheet)

| Wales; 111 (2) | v | England; 64 (2) |
| Becky Williams (22); Alex Hales (5/-12) | | Beth Howe (17), Roxanne White (17); Beth Howe (2/4) |

Wales won by 47 runs

14 October 2009
(scoresheet)

| Australia; 109 (3) | v | New Zealand; 85 (1) |
| Rikki-Lee Rimmington (19); Rikki-Lee Rimmington (3/-8) | | Natasha Williams (20); Natalie Glubb (1/7) |

Australia won by 14 runs

14 October 2009
(scoresheet)

| South Africa; 90 (2) | v | Australia; 125 (2) |
| Hilda Nienaber (24); Lucy Neto (2/1) | | Judith Coleman (25), Neisha Iles (25); Elizabeth Hall (4/-10) |

Australia won by 35 runs

14 October 2009
(scoresheet)

| England; 40 (0) | v | New Zealand; 156 (4) |
| Abbey Hawkins (19); Alison Foxhall (2/25) | | Tori Burbery (27); Jess Little (4/-14) |

New Zealand won by 116 runs

Ladder at conclusion of Day Four

| Team | Pld | W | T | L | S | % | Pts |
|---|---|---|---|---|---|---|---|
| Australia | 7 | 7 | 0 | 0 | 24 | 330.96 | 45 |
| South Africa | 6 | 4 | 0 | 2 | 16 | 176.87 | 28 |
| New Zealand | 6 | 3 | 0 | 3 | 15 | 112.25 | 24 |
| Wales | 6 | 1 | 0 | 5 | 5 | 38.77 | 8 |
| England | 7 | 1 | 0 | 6 | 4 | 36.82 | 7 |

=== Day Five ===
Day five featured both free and ticketed matches. The theme of "World Cup Men's Night" saw a full round of Men's matches played during the ticketed session, whilst the daytime Men's games and all Women's games were during free admission periods.

Men's Division

15 October 2009
(scoresheet)

| Sri Lanka; 105 (1) | v | England; 144 (3) |
| Sachindra Gonaduwa (23); Duncan Arnolda (2/11) | | Clint McCabe (31); Blake van de Linde (2/7) |

England won by 39 runs

15 October 2009
(scoresheet)

| Sri Lanka; 53 (0) | v | New Zealand; 182 (4) |
| Duncan Arnolda (20); Niranjan Rajapakse (2/14) | | Tim Papps (34); Scott Davies (3/-4) |

New Zealand won by 129 runs

15 October 2009
(scoresheet)

| Australia; 110 (4) | v | Sri Lanka; 77 (0) |
| Lee Irwin (24); Daniel McLauchlan (3/-6) | | Dilshan Witharana (17), Duncan Arnolda (17); Tharindu Mendia (2/3) |

Australia won by 33 runs

15 October 2009
(scoresheet)

| South Africa; 92 (3) | v | New Zealand; 74 (1) |
| Neil Burger (27); Ben Maritz (3/-3) | | Brendan Donkers (16); Jon Routhan (4/-7) |

South Africa won by 18 runs

Ladder at conclusion of Day Five

| Team | Pld | W | T | L | S | % | Pts |
|---|---|---|---|---|---|---|---|
| Australia | 8 | 8 | 0 | 0 | 29 | 261.17 | 53 |
| New Zealand | 8 | 5 | 3 | 2 | 18 | 144.03 | 33 |
| South Africa | 8 | 4 | 0 | 4 | 16 | 125.13 | 28 |
| England | 8 | 3 | 0 | 5 | 14 | 68.88 | 23 |
| Sri Lanka | 8 | 0 | 0 | 8 | 3 | 35.85 | 3 |

Women's Division

15 October 2009
(scoresheet)

| South Africa; 94 (3) | v | New Zealand; 108 (1) |
| Nicola Nel (21); Hanri Strydom (2/2) | | Natasha Williams (25), Holly Huddleston (25); Natasha Williams (4/-7) |

New Zealand won by 14 runs

15 October 2009
(scoresheet)

| Wales; 62 (0) | v | Australia; 184 (4) |
| Jackie Hawker (28); Jen Withers (1/22) | | Rebecca Cook (42); Olivia Magno (3/-6) |

Australia won by 122 runs

15 October 2009
(scoresheet)

| Wales; 70 (1) | v | New Zealand; 137 (3) |
| Sarah Ginn (20); Marsha Davies (4/2) | | Kirsta Neilson (29); Sarah White (2/2) |

New Zealand won by 67 runs

15 October 2009
(scoresheet)

| England; 90 (1) | v | South Africa; 131 (3) |
| Abbey Hawkins (18); Beth Howe (2/5), Laura Owen (2/5) | | Kirsten Blair (24); Benita vd Merwe (3/1) |

South Africa won by 41 runs

Ladder at conclusion of Day Five

| Team | Pld | W | T | L | S | % | Pts |
|---|---|---|---|---|---|---|---|
| Australia | 8 | 8 | 0 | 0 | 28 | 255.04 | 52 |
| South Africa | 8 | 5 | 0 | 3 | 22 | 143.32 | 37 |
| New Zealand | 8 | 5 | 0 | 3 | 19 | 129.74 | 34 |
| Wales | 8 | 1 | 0 | 7 | 6 | 47.04 | 9 |
| England | 8 | 1 | 0 | 7 | 5 | 40.70 | 8 |

== Finals ==
=== Semi finals ===
Day six of the tournament featured all of the semi-finals from both divisions and followed a top four format. The first and second-placed sides contested the Major Semi-final with the winner progressing to the World Cup Final whilst the loser contested the Preliminary Final against the winner of the Minor Semi-final featuring the third and fourth-placed sides. All matches took place during ticketed sessions.

The semi finals saw both the Australian men and Australian women suffer their first losses of the tournament.

Men's Division

A: Major Semi-final (1v2)

16 October 2009
(scoresheet)

| New Zealand; 73 (2) | v | Australia; 54 (2) |
| Leigh Kelly (23); Tim Papps (4/-2) | | Troy Gurski (23); Troy Gurski (3/-8) |

New Zealand won by 19 runs

- This match saw New Zealand advance directly to the World Cup Final by virtue of their first win over Australia since 2006. It also represented Australia's first loss of the tournament.

B: Minor Semi-final (3v4)

16 October 2009
(scoresheet)

| South Africa; 62 (4) | v | England; 26 (0) |
| Stef Le Roux (18); Renato De Almeida (4/-7) | | Wayne Kylander (8); Sean Ongers (4/-10) |

South Africa won by 36 runs

- As a result of their loss in this match, England were eliminated from the tournament.

Preliminary Final (Loser A v Winner B)

16 October 2009
(scoresheet)

| Australia; 92 (3) | v | South Africa; 49 (1) |
| Jay Otto (23); Jay Otto (5/-12) | | Egbert Lubbe (16); Ben Maritz (3/1) |

Australia won by 43 runs

- As a result of their loss in this match, South Africa were eliminated from the tournament.

Women's Division

A: Major Semi-final (1v2)

16 October 2009
(scoresheet)

| Australia; 104 (1) | v | South Africa; 110 (3) |
| Cindy Kross (19); Judith Coleman (1/9) | | Hanri Strydom (20); Benita vd Merwe (3/0) |

South Africa won by 6 runs

- This match represented Australia's first loss of the tournament.

B: Minor Semi-final (3v4)

16 October 2009
(scoresheet)

| Wales; 99 (0) | v | New Zealand; 175 (4) |
| Marsha Davies (21); Alex Hales (1/13) | | Jess Little (32); Kimberley Minogue (3/1) |

New Zealand won by 76 runs

- As a result of their loss in this match, Wales were eliminated from the tournament.

Preliminary Final (Loser A v Winner B)

16 October 2009
(scoresheet)

| Australia; 127 (4) | v | New Zealand; 24 (0) |
| Wendy Kemp (25); Rikki-Lee Rimmington (5/-16) | | Kimberley Minogue (13); Kimberley Minogue (1/9), Tori Burbery (1/9) |

Australia won by 103 runs.

- As a result of their loss in this match, New Zealand were eliminated from the tournament.

=== World Cup Final ===
The seventh and final day of the tournament featured the World Cup Finals. Both the Australian Men and Australian Women won their respective finals in close matches and kept Australia's flawless World Cup title record intact.

Men's Division

17 October 2009
(scoresheet)

| New Zealand; 44 (1) | v | Australia; 55 (3) |
| Nigel Collins (15); Bryce Fellows (5/-20) | | Troy Gurski (18); Daniel McLauchlan (4/-9) |

Australia won by 11 runs

Women's Division

17 October 2009
(scoresheet)

| Australia; 120 (3) | v | South Africa; 96 (1) |
| Rikki-Lee Rimmington (23); Rebecca Cook (4/-2) | | Celeste Rennie (25); Dominique de Carvalho (4/1) |

Australia won by 24 runs

== See also ==
- Indoor Cricket World Cup
