= Natasha Williams =

Natasha Williams may refer to:

- Natasha Williams (actress), British actress
- Sasha Williams (actress), Natasha Williams, Canadian actress
- Natasha Williams (cricketer) in 2009 Indoor Cricket World Cup
- Natasha Williams (Neighbours), a character from the Australian soap opera Neighbours

== See also ==
- Tasha Williams (disambiguation)
- Natashia Williams, American actress
