= Sport in Brisbane =

Overview of sports in Brisbane, Australia

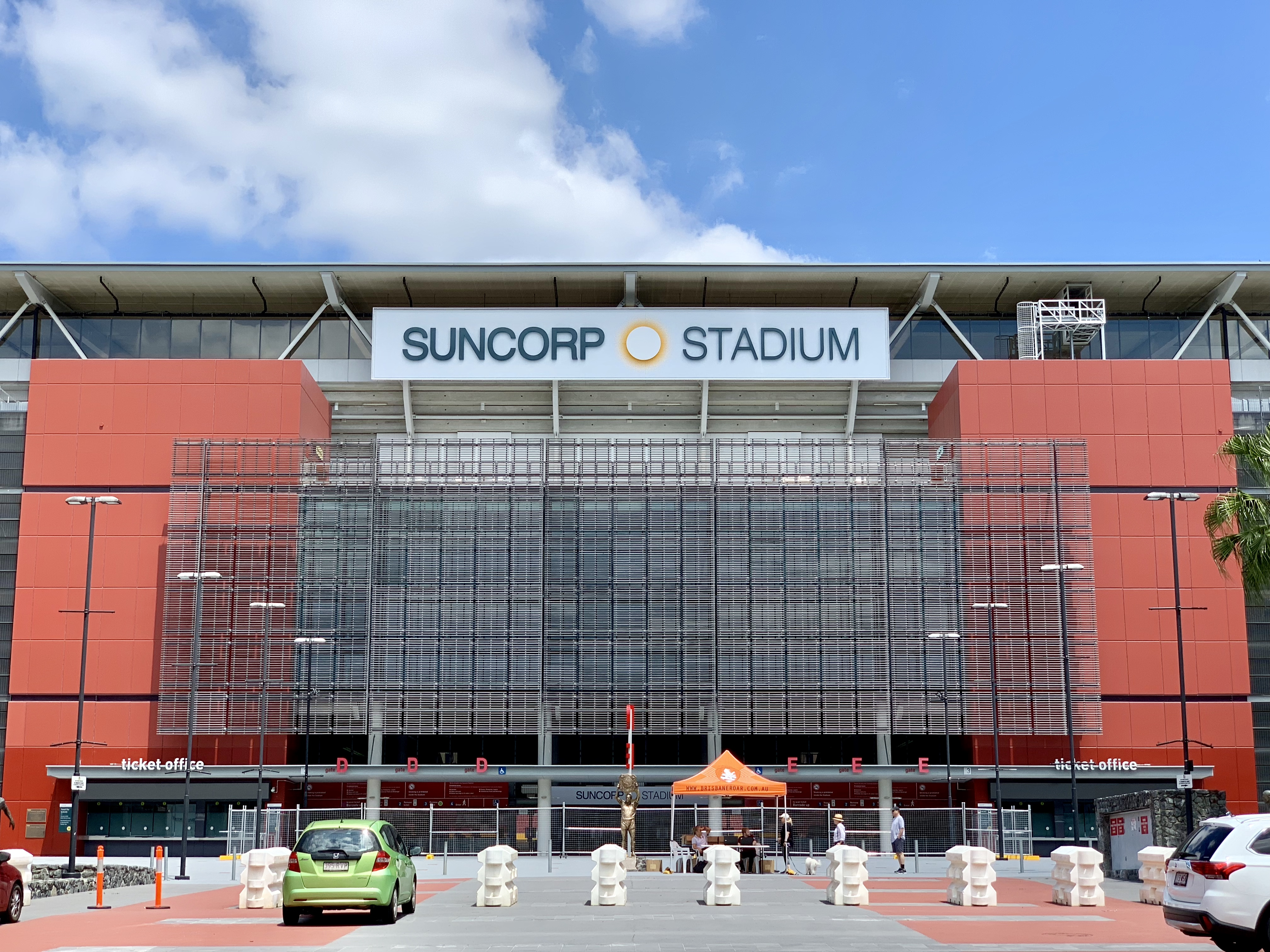
Suncorp Stadium, home of the Brisbane Broncos.

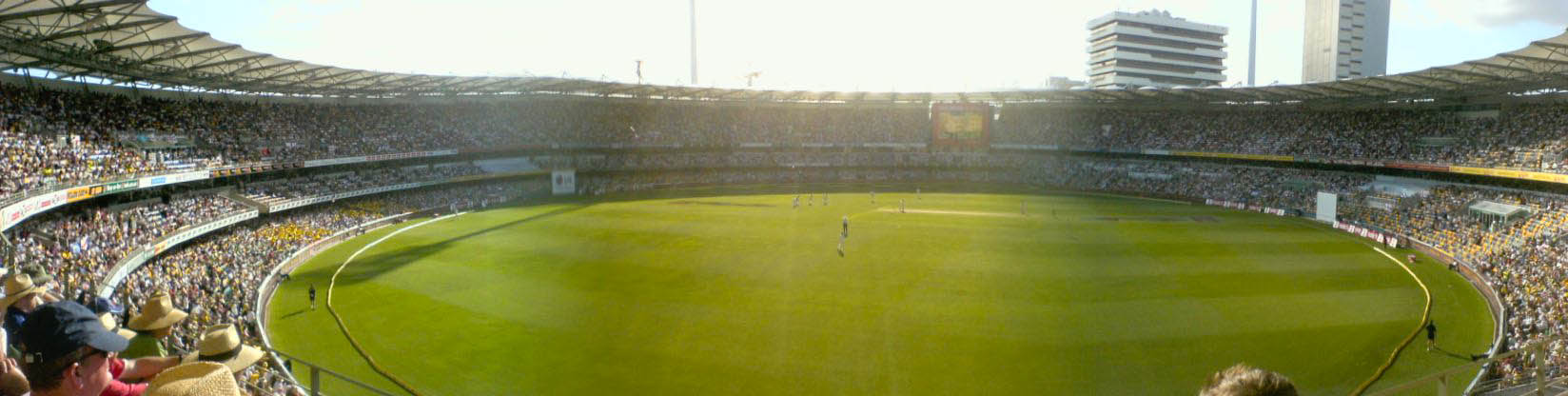
Brisbane Cricket Ground ("The 'Gabba")

Sport is a significant aspect of the Brisbane lifestyle. Activities range from the occasional international event, annual competitions, competitive leagues and individual recreational pursuits.

Across the city there are 20 public swimming pools, many kilometres of dedicated bikeways, ovals and other sports venues. The city's major stadiums and sporting venues include the Gabba (a 42,000 seat round stadium at Woolloongabba), Lang Park (a 52,500 seat rectangular stadium at Milton also known by its corporate name Suncorp Stadium), Ballymore Stadium, the Queensland Sport & Athletics Centre, the Sleeman Sports Complex (swimming), the State Tennis Centre, the Eagle Farm Racecourse and the Doomben Racecourse.

Rugby league is popular in Brisbane and the city hosts the Brisbane Broncos and Dolphins, who play in the National Rugby League competition, and the Queensland Maroons who play in the State of Origin series. In rugby union the city hosts the Queensland Reds who play in the Super Rugby competition. Cricket is popular in the Brisbane and the city hosts the Brisbane Heat who play in the Big Bash League and the Queensland Bulls who play in the Sheffield Shield and the Ryobi One Day Cup.

Brisbane also hosts Delta Gymnastics, along with an A-League soccer team, the Brisbane Roar FC; an Australian Football League team, the Brisbane Lions; a basketball team, the Brisbane Bullets; a baseball team, the Brisbane Bandits; a netball team, the Queensland Firebirds; a field hockey team, the Brisbane Blaze; and water polo teams the Brisbane Barracudas and Queensland Breakers.

== Popular sports ==
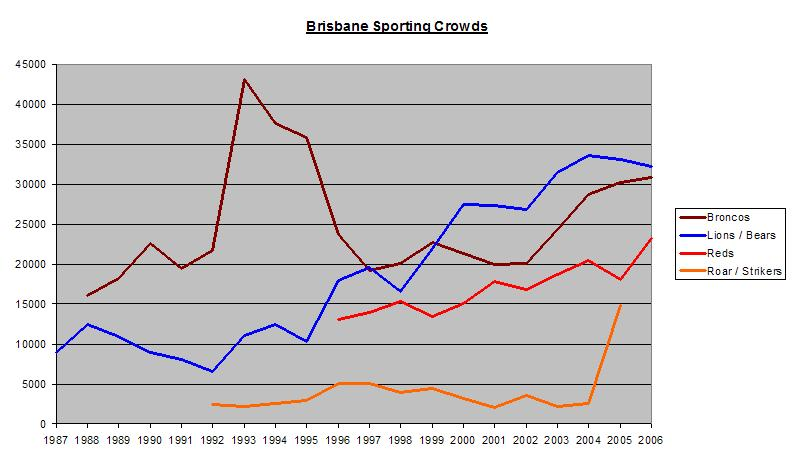
Graph showing the average attendance of Brisbane teams in national sporting competitions from 1987–2006. (Current to 22 April 2006.)

Rugby league is the most popular spectator sport in Brisbane. In 2006 565,898 people attended first class rugby league matches at Lang Park. Other popular spectator sports include Cricket, Football (soccer), Australian rules football, rugby union and basketball. The martial arts are also popular in Brisbane, with the more traditional western combative disciplines and also because of the proximity to Asian countries where the arts are historically based. While participation rates are high it tends not to enjoy the profile of traditional Australia sports, though the olympic sports of boxing, judo and taekwondo are more well known. For the Asian arts there are many places to practice in Brisbane.

=== Teams in national competitions ===
Team	Sport	Competition	Home Ground
Brisbane Broncos	Rugby league	National Rugby League	Lang Park
Dolphins	Rugby league	National Rugby League	Lang Park
Queensland Maroons	Rugby league	Rugby league/State of Origin	Lang Park
Queensland Reds	Rugby union	Super Rugby	Lang Park
Brisbane Heat	Cricket	Big Bash League	The Gabba
Queensland Bulls	Cricket	Pura Cup; ING Cup; KFC Twenty20 Big Bash	The Gabba
Brisbane Lions	Australian rules football	Australian Football League; AFL Women's	The Gabba; South Pine Sports Complex
Sunshine Coast Lightning	Netball	Suncorp Super Netball	UniSC Arena
Brisbane Roar	Football (soccer)	A-League; W-League	Lang Park
Brisbane Bandits	Baseball	Australian Baseball League	Holloway Field
Brisbane Bullets	Basketball	National Basketball League	Nissan Arena
Brisbane Barracudas	Water polo	Australian National Water Polo League	Musgrave Park Swimming Centre
Brisbane Blaze	Hockey	Hockey One	Queensland State Hockey Centre
Queensland Breakers	Water polo	Australian National Water Polo League	Valley Pool
Queensland Fire	Cricket	Women's National Cricket League	Allan Border Field
Queensland Firebirds	Netball	Suncorp Super Netball	Nissan Arena
Brisbane City Cobras	Touch Football	National Touch League	Quad Park, Kawana
Queensland Scorchers	Hockey	Australian Hockey League	Queensland State Hockey Centre
Triple Eight Race Engineering	Motorsport	International V8 Supercars Championship	Queensland Raceway

=== Semi-Professional Sport Teams ===
Team	Sport	Competition	Home Ground	Established
Eastern Suburbs Tigers	Rugby league	Queensland Cup	Langlands Park	1923
Norths Devils	Rugby league	Queensland Cup	Albert Bishop Park	1927
Souths Logan Magpies	Rugby league	Queensland Cup	Davies Park	1931
Wynnum Manly Seagulls	Rugby league	Queensland Cup	Kougari Oval	1931
Brisbane Strikers	Soccer	National Premier Leagues (Queensland)	Perry Park, Brisbane	1994
Queensland Academy of Sport	Soccer	National Premier Leagues (Queensland)	Meakin Park	1991
University of Queensland Rugby Club	Rugby Union	Queensland Premier Rugby	University of Queensland	1911
Brothers Old Boys	Rugby Union	Queensland Premier Rugby		1905
Easts Tigers Rugby Union	Rugby Union	Queensland Premier Rugby		1947
Sunnybank Rugby	Rugby Union	Queensland Premier Rugby	Biggs Field	1969
Souths Rugby	Rugby Union	Queensland Premier Rugby	Yeronga Memorial Park	1948
Queensland Country Heelers	Rugby Union	Australian Rugby Shield	Regional Centres	2000
Brisbane Capitals	Basketball	Queensland Basketball League	NAB Stadium Auchenflower	N/A
Brisbane Spartans	Basketball	South East Australian Basketball League		N/A
Brisbane Lady Spartans	Basketball	South East Australian Basketball League		N/A
Sun State Roller Girls	Roller Derby	Northern Brisbane Rollers	Beenleigh Arena	2007
Brisbane City Rollers	Roller Derby	Northern Brisbane Rollers	Ipswich Show Grounds	2009
South Brisbane Futsal Club	Futsal	F-League	Eagles Sports Complex	2010
Brisbane Wolves	Handball	Australian Handball League	Eagles Sports Complex	2016

=== Attendance figures ===
==== 2011 ====
Sport	Major venues	Aggregate attendance	Average	Events counted
Motorsport	Surfers Paradise Street Circuit; Townsville Street Circuit; Queensland Raceway	382,487	127,496	V8 Supercars (3)
Rugby league	Lang Park	356,585	35,658	Brisbane Broncos home games (5); Gold Coast Titans home games (2); ANZAC Test; Rugby League State of Origin games (1); Canterbury Bulldogs home game (1)
Rugby union	Lang Park	301,020	30,101	Queensland Reds home games (10)
Football (soccer)	Lang Park	235,349	13,075	Queensland Roar home games (18)
Australian rules football	The Gabba	141,178	28,329	Brisbane Lions home games (5)
Cricket	The Gabba	55,351	27,675	One day internationals (2)
Basketball	Brisbane Convention & Exhibition Centre	16,739	3,347	Brisbane Bullets home games (5)
Baseball	Brisbane Exhibition Ground	5,951	992	Brisbane Bandits home games (6)

==== 2007 ====
Sport	Major venues	Aggregate attendance	Average	Events counted
Rugby league	Lang Park	356,585	35,658	Brisbane Broncos home games (5); Gold Coast Titans home games (2); ANZAC Test; Rugby League State of Origin games (1); Canterbury Bulldogs home game (1)
Rugby union	Lang Park	108,608	18,101	Queensland Reds home games (6)
Australian rules football	The Gabba	141,178	28,329	Brisbane Lions home games (5)
Cricket	The Gabba	55,351	27,675	One day internationals (2)
Basketball	Brisbane Convention & Exhibition Centre	16,739	3,347	Brisbane Bullets home games (5)
Football (soccer)	Suncorp Stadium	32,371	32,371	Queensland Roar home games (1)

==== 2006 ====
Sport	Major venues	Aggregate attendance	Average	Events counted
Rugby league	Lang Park	565,898	35,368	ANZAC Test; Rugby League Tri-nations Test; Brisbane Broncos home games (13); Rugby League State of Origin
Australian rules football	The Gabba	339,371	26,151	Brisbane Lions home games (11); Melbourne Demons home game (1); Queensland State League grand final
Cricket	The Gabba	299,161	24,930	One day internationals (3); Queensland Bulls one day match (3); Twenty/20 international (1); Test match (5 days); 20/20 interstate match
Rugby union	Lang Park; Ballymore Stadium	245,400	22,309	Queensland Reds home games (8); Wallabies Test matches (2); Premier Rugby Final
Football (soccer)	Lang Park	250,189	53,971	Queensland Roar home games (6); Socceroos home game (1)
Basketball	Brisbane Convention & Exhibition Centre	9,923	3,307	Brisbane Bullets home games (2)

==== 2005 ====
Sport	Major venues	Aggregate attendance	Average	Events counted
Rugby league	Lang Park	516,103	32,256	ANZAC Test; Brisbane Broncos home games (12); Queensland Cup grand final Rugby League State of Origin (2)
Australian rules football	The Gabba	400,468	30,554	Brisbane Lions home games (11); Melbourne Demons home games (1); Queensland State League grand final
Rugby union	Lang Park; Ballymore Stadium	162,256	20,282	Wallabies Test match Queensland Reds home games (6); Premier Rugby final
Football (soccer)	Lang Park	122,983	15,372	Queensland Roar home games (8)
Basketball	Brisbane Convention & Exhibition Centre	26,396	3,300	Brisbane Bullets home games (8)

== Sports venues ==
=== Lang Park ===
Lang Park in Milton is nicknamed 'The Cauldron' and is the spiritual home of Rugby League in Brisbane. It is the home of Queensland Rugby League, the Brisbane Broncos (Rugby league), the Brisbane Roar (Football (soccer)), the Queensland Reds (Rugby Union) and the annual State of Origin rugby league clash between Queensland (the Maroons) and New South Wales (the Blues). Lang Park became Suncorp Stadium in 1994 after Suncorp became naming rights sponsor. Individual players and officials face stiff fines if they accidentally publicly refer to the venue by its former name, Lang Park.

=== The Gabba ===
The Gabba hosts domestic and international cricket matches, as well as Australian rules football. Home of the Queensland Bulls (Cricket) and the Brisbane Lions (Australian rules football), the Gabba hosted Olympic football matches for the Sydney 2000 Olympics and was the site of the famous tied test of 1960 between the West Indies and Australia. Teams based there include: Queensland Bulls (Cricket) and Brisbane Lions (Australian rules football).

=== Queensland Sport and Athletics Centre (QSAC) ===
The Queensland Sport and Athletics Centre (QSAC), formerly known as QEII ('QE2') Stadium and later ANZ Stadium, at Nathan is the third largest sporting arena in Queensland. The stadium was built as a temporary venue for the 1982 Commonwealth Games but endured as home for the Brisbane Broncos rugby league team during the 1990s and hosted the 2001 Goodwill Games.

=== Brisbane Exhibition Ground ===
The Brisbane Exhibition Ground (also known as the RNA Showgrounds) is the home ground of the Australian Baseball League team the Brisbane Bandits between November and February. It also hosts the Brisbane Ekka that takes place every August. It has also been the home to Cricket, Rugby league, Australian rules football and Speedway style Motor Racing.

=== Ballymore ===
Ballymore Stadium is the home of Rugby union in Brisbane, and is the former home of the Queensland Reds (who play in the Super Rugby Pacific competition) who moved to Suncorp Stadium and the Ballymore Tornadoes, the local Australian Rugby Championship entrant before the competition folded. It also plays host to Brisbane Premier Rugby finals, and was once home to the Brisbane Strikers soccer club.

=== Oxenham Park ===
Located in Nundah, Oxenham Park has been the home ground of Toombul District Cricket Club – who play in the Brisbane Premier Cricket competition – since 1892. Oxenham Park was also the original home ground of Norths Devils from 1933–1969, before they moved to Bishop Park, also in Nundah.

=== Perry Park ===
Perry Park is the spiritual home of Football (soccer) in Brisbane, and is home to the Brisbane Strikers, who play in the local Brisbane competition after being unsuccessful in their A-League bid.

=== Other sports grounds ===
- Brisbane Convention & Exhibition Centre – team based there: Brisbane Bullets (Basketball)
- Langlands Park— team based there: Easts Tigers (Rugby league)
- Sleeman Sports Complex – team based there: Queensland Firebirds (Netball)
- Downey Park, located in Windsor, is a major location for field hockey and netball games, particularly for school groups and clubs.
- Lakeside Park located at Dakabin and used for Motor racing.
- Langlands Park located at Stones Corner.
- Purtell Park located at Bardon
- Queensland State Equestrian Centre – equestrian sport venue located in Caboolture
- Queensland Tennis Centre
- Victoria Park – an enormous-size park, which contains tennis courts, the Centenary swimming pool, a golf course and a sports ground.
- Walton Bridge Reserve, located at The Gap, contains sporting fields and skateboard area

== Sports events ==
- 1982 Commonwealth Games are held in Brisbane
- 1987 Pan Pacific Swimming Championships
- Hosted three matches of the 1992 Cricket World Cup
- 2000 Olympic football matches during Sydney Olympics
- 2001 Goodwill Games are held in Brisbane
- 2003 Hosted matches during Rugby World Cup, including a quarter-final
- 2009 Brisbane hosts the 2009 Indoor Cricket World Cup, with Australian teams winning in all divisions
- 2011 Brisbane hosts the Australian Masters Nationals Championships, 21–24 April. Cross Country hosted by Thompson Estate Athletics at Minnippi Parklands.
- 2011 Super Rugby Final Queensland Reds vs Canterbury Crusaders
- Annual The Gabba Test Cricket match
- Annual Rugby League State of Origin football series at Lang Park
- Besides spectator sport and sports teams, Brisbane hosts several mass participation events each year, including the Bridge to Brisbane fun run (held this year in September) and the Brisbane Marathon in August each year.

== Highlights ==
- 1960 – The Gabba the Test match between Australia and the West Indies ended with a tie on 14 December 1960.
  It was the first Tied Test in the history of cricket.
- 1980 – the first ever Rugby League State of Origin match was held in Brisbane at Lang Park, with the Maroons winning 20–10.
- 1982 – the Commonwealth Games, which were held at QEII Stadium and other sports venues in Brisbane, were very successful. The Commonwealth Games were opened by Duke of Edinburgh, and were closed by Queen Elizabeth II. The mascot for the Commonwealth Games was Matilda, a giant-sized 13-metre high mechanical kangaroo who winked at the spectators.
- 1997 – the Brisbane Broncos won the Super League premiership at ANZ Stadium in front of more than 58,000 people. It was the first
  (and to this day, only) Australia-wide Rugby League Grand Final held outside of Sydney.
- 2011 – the Queensland Reds win their first Super Rugby in front of yet another capacity crowd at Lang Park
- 2021 - Queensland Reds win fourth Super Rugby title in front of capacity crowd

== Notable Brisbane-born sportspeople ==
Brisbane is the birthplace of many well-known and famous sportsmen and sportswomen.

=== Basketball ===
Brad Williamson

=== Boxing ===
Jeff Horn

=== Cricket ===
Michael Kasprowicz – Nathan Rimmington – Chris Simpson – Andrew Symonds – Andy Bichel

=== Cycling ===
Robbie McEwen – Ryan Guettler

=== Motorsport ===
Scott Dixon – Dick Johnson

=== Rugby league ===
Shaun Berrigan – Wally Lewis – Darren Lockyer – Allan Langer

=== Rugby union ===
John Eales – Michael Lynagh

=== Swimming ===
Jodie Henry – Alice Mills – Susie O'Neill – Kieren Perkins – Stephanie Rice – Samantha Riley – Giaan Rooney – Jessicah Schipper

=== Soccer ===
Craig Moore

=== Tennis ===
Samantha Stosur

== See also ==
- History of soccer in Brisbane, Queensland
- Sport in Queensland
- Sports on the Gold Coast, Queensland
- Sport in Sydney
