= Fogwill (surname) =

Fogwill is a surname. Notable people with the surname include:

- Frank Fogwill (1902–1974), Canadian electrician, labour leader and politician
- Rodolfo Enrique Fogwill (1941–2010), Argentine short story writer, novelist and businessman
- Sarah Fogwill (born 1988), British cricketer
- Vera Fogwill (born 1972), Argentine actress, film director and screenplay writer
