= Vitharana =

Vitharana (Sinhala: විතාරන) is a Sri Lankan surname. Notable people with the surname include:

- Dilshan Vitharana (born 1978), Sri Lankan cricketer
- Tissa Vitharana (1934–2026), Sri Lankan physician and politician
- Vini Vitharana (1928–2019), Sri Lankan linguist
