= Tasha Williams =

Tasha Williams may refer to:

- Tasha Williams, see List_of_The_L_Word_characters#W
- Tasha Williams (athlete) (born 1973), New Zealand Olympic hammer thrower

== See also ==
- Natasha Williams (disambiguation)
