= Queensland State Equestrian Centre =

Equestrian sport venue in Moreton Bay, Queensland

- QSEC
- Interactive map of Queensland State Equestrian Centre
- Full name: Queensland State Equestrian Centre
- Location: Caboolture, City of Moreton Bay, Queensland, Australia
- Coordinates: 27.06291°S 152.94755°E
- Owner: Moreton Bay Regional Council
- Operator: Moreton Bay Regional Council
- Capacity: 3,200 equestrian spectators or 5,000 for a concert
- Surface: Sand
- Field size: 80m x 40m (indoor)

Construction
- Built: August 2011
- Opened: 3 September 2011
- Cost: $17.28 million
- Architect: PDT Architects
- Structural engineers: Bornhorst & Ward
- General contractor: Walton Construction

Queensland State Equestrian Centre is an equestrian sport venue located at 1010 Beerburrum Road, Caboolture, City of Moreton Bay, Queensland, Australia. It was opened in September 2011.

The facilities include:

- An 80m x 40m indoor, sand arena with seating for 3,200 equestrian spectators or 5,200 for a concert, judges and commentators rooms and PA system
- Warm up areas including a fully lit, 60m x 20m sand warm up arena
- 4 all-weather, sand dressage arenas with covered viewing areas
- 154 stables with anti-slip rubber matting
- 8 wash bays
- 55 camp sites with power and water access
- Camp sites (see below)
- 2 meeting/training rooms
- A licensed bar

The Queensland State Equestrian Centre has 154 stables in close proximity to the camp sites, the main arena, warm up arena and dressage arenas.

Stable Facilities:

- 154 stables measuring 3.6m x 3.6m with anti-slip rubber matting and bitumen aisles
- Water and lighting in each aisle
- 8 wash bays
- A dedicated vets room
- Horse waste bays
- A PA system link to the main arena
- Sawdust bedding

The Queensland State Equestrian Centre has 55 camp sites with water and power access as well as additional ‘informal’ camping spaces. The camp sites are split into three different sizes allowing for large horse trucks, camper vans and goosenecks through to smaller horse trucks and horse floats. The width of all powered sites are 5.5m and the lengths vary from 16m to 25.5m.

Camping Facilities:

- 55 camp sites with power and water access
- Further unpowered camp sites
- A large amenities block toilets and showers
- Camping reception

== See also ==
- Equestrian Australia
- Sport in Brisbane
- Sport in Queensland
