= Sport in Queensland =

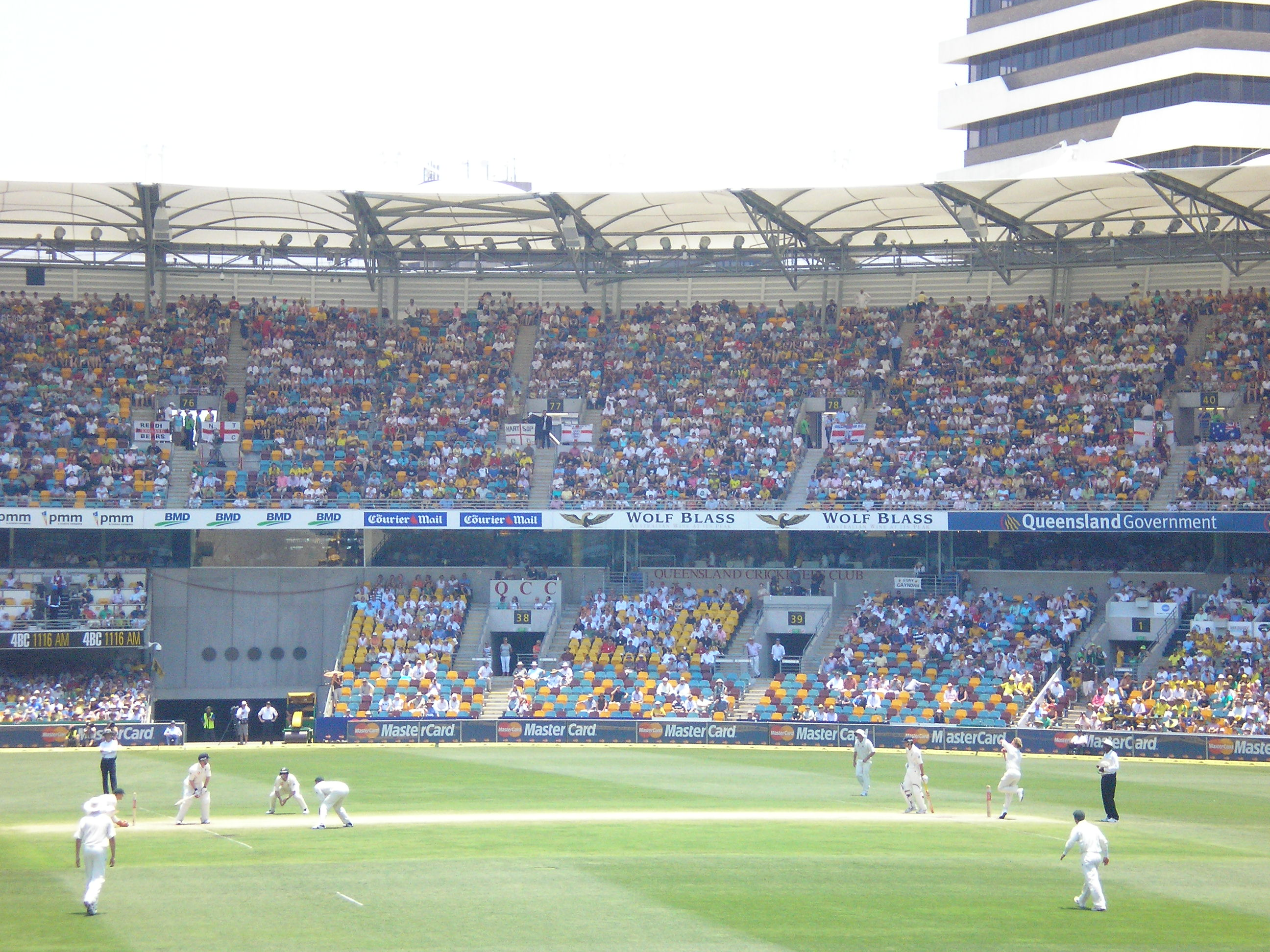
An Ashes Test at The Gabba

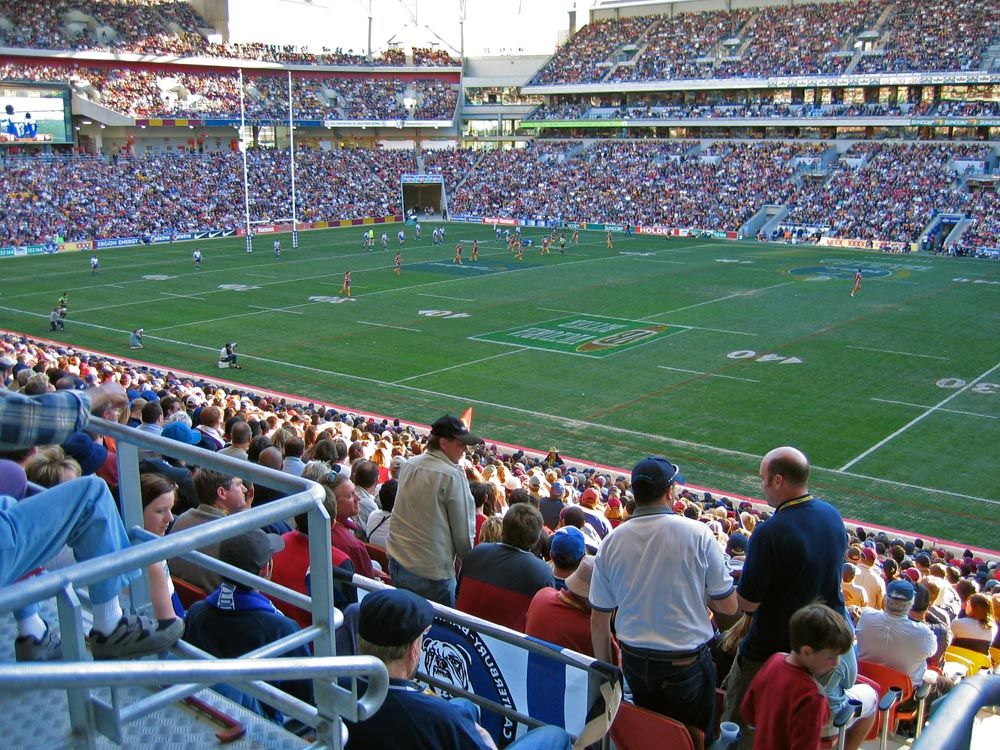
Brisbane Broncos at Lang Park

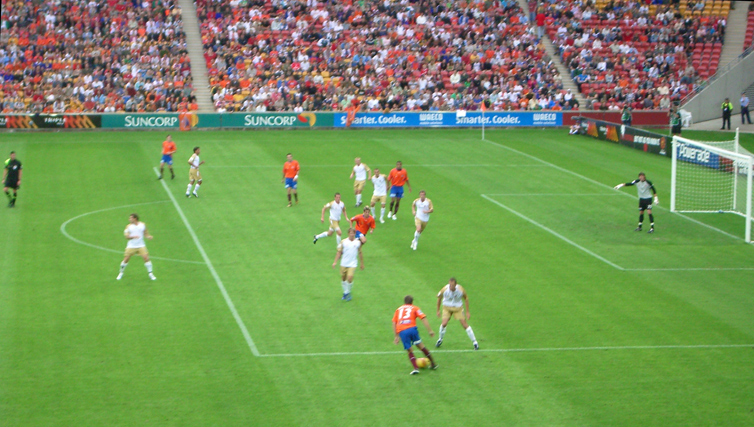
Brisbane Roar are playing at Lang Park

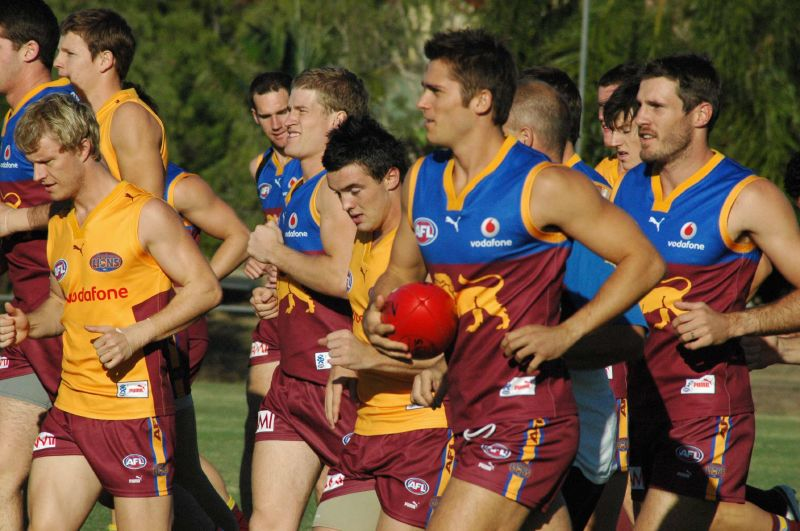
Brisbane Lions players in training

Sport is an important part of the culture of the Australian state of Queensland. Many different sports are played in Queensland, whether recreationally, competitively, or professionally.

== Australian rules football ==
Australian Football has a long history in Queensland. The first foray made by the then-VFL came in the form of the Brisbane Bears, who began playing Premiership matches in 1987. Despite some rocky times in the northern state, the game now appears to be entrenched within Queensland, thanks to a hat-trick of AFL Premiership wins from 2001 to 2003. The introduction of the Gold Coast Suns in 2011 highlights the game's growth in Queensland.

== Basketball ==
Basketball is a popular sport in Queensland, and offers an alternative to outdoor sport during rainy weather. Since the National Basketball League's inception in 1979, at least one team has been based in Queensland. Queensland has two current NBL teams:

- Brisbane Bullets – based at Nissan Arena, Brisbane – founded in 1979
- Cairns Taipans – based at the Cairns Convention Centre, Cairns – founded in 1999

== Cricket ==
Cricket is popular in Queensland. Many domestic and international matches are held at the Gabba. The Queensland Bulls and the Brisbane Heat are based in Brisbane and represent Queensland in Australia's domestic cricket tournaments:

- Sheffield Shield, 4-day matches with first-class status, since the 1926/27 season
- Marsh One-Day Cup, a one-day (50 over per side) tournament with List-A status, since its inception in 1969/70
- Big Bash League, a 20 overs per side tournament, since its inception in 2011/12

== Rugby league ==
Rugby league is the most spectated sport in Queensland. Queensland Rugby League has been in operation since 1908, creating strong roots in both city and regional communities. There are currently four teams in the National Rugby League competition, two of which have been part of the NRL since its inauguration in 1998:

- Brisbane Broncos – based at Lang Park, Brisbane – founded in 1988
- Gold Coast Titans – based at Cbus Super Stadium, Gold Coast – founded in 2007
- North Queensland Cowboys – based at Queensland Country Bank Stadium, Townsville, – founded in 1995
- Dolphins (NRL) – based at Kayo Stadium, Redcliffe - founded in 2023

The other major rugby league team is the Queensland Maroons who play New South Wales Blues in the fiercely contested three game State of Origin competition. The Maroons have recently won their third straight Origin series, as well as their eleventh from the past twelve.

The other major state-based competition is the Queensland Cup.

== Rugby union ==
Rugby Union is a major sport in Queensland with more than 55,000 registered players in 210 clubs and 235 schools across the state. The first games were played in 1876, and Queensland has been represented by the Queensland Reds since 1882, who currently compete in the Super Rugby competition.

In 2011, the Reds won the Super Rugby Championship in front of more than 52,000 fans. They repeated this feat in the 2021 Super Rugby AU Final.

== Soccer ==
The annual estimate for Adults 15+ participating in soccer was 1,086,094 (or 5.4% of the Adult 15+ population) and in children, 30% play the sport, second only to swimming in terms of participation.

Over 300,000 people are registered to play soccer with 308 clubs organised by Football Queensland. In 2023, the participation breakdown was 69.8% male and 30.2% female meaning more than 100,00 females play the sport

Soccer was first organised in the State in 1867 and today is represented professionally by Brisbane Roar in the men and women's A League, and semi-professionally there are 12 clubs in the Queensland National Premier League, and a further 50 or so clubs in the Queensland Premier League (QPL).

All 308 clubs are entitled to enter Australia's largest knock out competition, The Australia Cup, organised by Football Australia.

The State regularly hosts The Matildas and Socceroos.

== Swimming ==
Swimming is also a popular sport in Queensland, with a majority of Australian team members and international medalists hailing from the state. At the 2008 Summer Olympics, Queensland swimmers won all six of Australia's gold medals, all swimmers on Australia's three female (finals) relays teams were from Queensland, two of which won gold.

At the 2004 Summer Olympics, 2005 and 2007 World Long Course Swimming Championships, Australia won both the 4 × 100 m freestyle and medley relays. In five of these teams, three out of the four swimmers were from Queensland, and in the medley relay in 2007, all were from Queensland.

== Triathlon ==
Triathlon has been a popular sport in Queensland since the early 1980s with the state three times hosting the ITU World Championships in addition to: the Noosa Triathlon - the world's largest triathlon (also the country's longest-lasting event at the same venue), Mooloolaba Triathlon, Hervey Bay Triathlon and the Gold Coast Triathlon to name but a few.

== Major events ==
=== 1982 Commonwealth Games ===
- Motto: The Friendly Games
- Nations participating: 46
- Athletes participating: 1,583
- Events: 141 events in 12 sports
- Dates: 30 September to 9 October
- Mascot: Matilda (Kangaroo)

=== 1994 World Masters Games ===
- Motto: The Challenge Never Ends
- Nations participating 71
- Athletes participating: 23,659
- Events: 30 sports
- Dates: 26 September to 8 October

=== 2001 Goodwill Games ===
- Nations participating: 70
- Athletes participating: 1,300
- Events: 155 in 14 sports
- Dates: 29 August to 9 September

=== 2018 Commonwealth Games ===
- Motto: Share the Dream
- Nations participating: 71
- Athletes participating: 4,426
- Events: 275 in 18 sports
- Dates: 4 April to 15 April
- Mascot: Borobi (Koala)

=== 2019 INAS Global Games ===
- Nations participating: 50
- Athletes participating: 814
- Events: 11 sports
- Dates: 12 October to 19 October
- Mascot: Lori (Lorikeet)

== Other events ==
- Birdsville Races - annual horse races at Birdsville which were first held in 1882.
- Brisbane to Gladstone yacht race
- Gold Coast Indy 300 - open-wheel motor race at the Surfers Paradise Street Circuit held between 1991 and 2008.
- Gold Coast 600
- International Rally of Queensland
- Queensland 400
- Quicksilver Pro and Roxy Pro
- State of Origin - Best of three rugby league games between New South Wales and Queensland which began in 1980.
- Annual Bledisloe Cup Rugby Union matches - Australia vs New Zealand
- 2020 AFL Grand Final

== Queensland Sports Awards ==
Each year the Queensland Sport Awards are held. The major award is the Sport Star of the Year:

- 1995 Susan O'Neill - Swimming
- 1996 Susan O'Neill - Swimming
- 1997 Michael Doohan - Motorcycling
- 1998 Michael Doohan - Motorcycling
- 1999 Loretta Harrop - Triathlon
- 2000 Susan O'Neill - Swimming
- 2001 Grant Hackett - Swimming
- 2002 Matthew Hayden - Cricket
- 2003 Patrick Johnson - Athletics
- 2004 Jodie Henry - Swimming
- 2005 Grant Hackett - Swimming
- 2006 Emma Snowsill - Triathlon
- 2007 Matthew Hayden - Cricket
- 2008 Stephanie Rice - Swimming
- 2009 Greg Inglis - Rugby league
- 2010 Stephanie Gilmore - Surfing
- 2011 Samantha Stosur - Tennis
- 2012 Sally Pearson - Athletics
- 2013 Adam Scott - Golf
- 2014 Mat Belcher - Sailing
- 2015 Jason Day - Golf
- 2016 Cate Campbell - Swimming
- 2017 Jeff Horn - Boxing
- 2018 Cate Campbell - Swimming
- 2019 Ashleigh Barty - Tennis
- 2021 Ashleigh Barty & Emma McKeon - Tennis & Swimming
- 2022 Cameron Smith - Golf
- 2023 Molly O'Callaghan - Swimming
- 2024 Kaylee McKeown - Swimming

== Teams in national competitions ==
=== Brisbane-based ===
| Club/Team | Sport | League | Venue | Established | Premierships |
|---|---|---|---|---|---|
| Brisbane Bandits | Baseball | Australian Baseball League | Holloway Field | 1989 | 4 |
| Brisbane Broncos | Rugby league | National Rugby League | Lang Park | 1988 | 6 |
| Brisbane Bullets | Basketball | National Basketball League | Nissan Arena | 1979 | 3 |
| Brisbane Heat | Cricket | Big Bash League/Women's Big Bash League | The Gabba | 2011 | 2 |
| Brisbane Lightning | Ice hockey | Australian Ice Hockey League/Australian Women's Ice Hockey League | Ice World Boondall | 2006 | Nill |
| Brisbane Lions | Australian rules football | Australian Football League/AFL Women's | The Gabba | 1997 | 5 |
| Brisbane Roar | Football (soccer) | A-League/W-League | Lang Park | 2004 | 1/2 |
| Brisbane Blaze | Field hockey | Hockey One | Queensland State Hockey Centre | 2019 | 1 |
| Queensland Bulls | Cricket | Pura Cup/Ford Ranger Cup | The Gabba | 1892 | 13 |
| Queensland Firebirds | Netball | Suncorp Super Netball | Nissan Arena | 1997 | 3 |
| Queensland Pirates | Volleyball | Australian Volleyball League | Clayfield College Sports Centre | 1998 | 8 |
| Queensland Reds | Rugby union | Super Rugby | Lang Park | 1882 | 4 |
| Queensland Thunder | Water polo | Australian Water Polo League | The Valley Pool | 2019 | 1 |
| Triple Eight Race Engineering | Motor racing | Supercars Championship | Queensland Raceway | 2003 | 9 |

=== Outside Brisbane ===
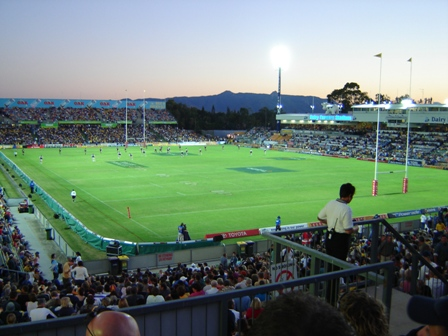
Willows Sports Complex in Townsville, the former home of the North Queensland Cowboys

| Club | Sport | League | Venue | Established | Premierships |
|---|---|---|---|---|---|
| Cairns Taipans | Basketball | National Basketball League | Cairns Convention Centre | 1999 | Nil |
| Dick Johnson Racing | Motorsport | Supercars Championship | Queensland Raceway | 1980 | 10 |
| Gold Coast Hawks | Bowls | Australian Premier League | Club Helensvale | 2014 | Nil |
| Gold Coast Suns | Australian rules football | Australian Football League | Carrara Stadium | 2011 | Nil |
| Gold Coast Titans | Rugby league | National Rugby League | Robina Stadium | 2007 | Nil |
| Moreton Bay Pirates | Bowls | Australian Premier League | Club Pine Rivers | 2018 | 2018 |
| North Queensland Cowboys | Rugby league | National Rugby League | North Queensland Stadium | 1995 | 1 |
| PremiAir Racing | Motorsport | Supercars Championship | Queensland Raceway | 2022 | Nil |
| Sunshine Coast Lightning | Netball | Suncorp Super Netball | USC Stadium | 2016 | 2 |
| Townsville Fire | Basketball | Women's National Basketball League | Townsville Entertainment Centre | 2001 | 5 |

== Sporting Venues ==
=== Brisbane ===
| Venue | Capacity | Main Sports |
|---|---|---|
| Acacia Ridge Iceworld | 300 | Ice Hockey, Speed Skating, Figure Skating |
| Albion Park Racecourse | ??? | Harness racing, Greyhound racing |
| Allan Border Field | 4,500 | Cricket |
| Auchenflower Stadium | 2,000 | Basketball |
| Ballymore Stadium | 24,000 | Rugby Union |
| Ice World Boondall | 300 | Ice Hockey, Speed Skating, Figure Skating |
| Brisbane Convention & Exhibition Centre | 4,000 | Basketball, Netball |
| The Gabba | 42,000 | Cricket, Aussie rules football |
| Brisbane Entertainment Centre | 14,500 | Basketball, Netball |
| Brisbane Exhibition Ground | 25,500 | Baseball |
| Brisbane International Speedway | 10,000 | Speedway motor racing |
| Brisbane Aquatic Centre | 4,300 | Swimming, Diving |
| Chandler Arena | 2,700 | Basketball, Netball |
| Anna Meares Velodrome | 3,500 | Cycling |
| Dolphin Oval | 15,000 | Rugby league |
| Doomben Racecourse | 22,000 | Horse racing |
| Eagle Farm Racecourse | 43,000 | Horse racing |
| Holloway Field | 1,500 | Baseball |
| John Murray Field | 1,500 | Baseball |
| Lakeside Park | 30,000 | Motorsport |
| Lang Park | 52,500 | Rugby league, Association Football (soccer), Rugby Union |
| Langlands Park | 5,000 | Rugby league |
| Mick Doohan Raceway | ??? | Motorcycle speedway, Motocross |
| North Ipswich Reserve | 10,000 | Rugby league |
| Perry Park | 10,000 | Association football (soccer) |
| Queensland State Netball Centre | 5,000 | Basketball, Netball |
| Queensland Sport & Athletics Centre | 49,000 | Rugby league, Athletics |
| Queensland State Equestrian Centre | 3,200 | Equestrian |
| Queensland State Hockey Centre | 500 | Field Hockey |
| Spencer Park | 10,000 | Association football (soccer) |

=== Outside Brisbane ===
| Venue | Capacity | Main Sports | Location |
|---|---|---|---|
| Barlow Park | 18,000 | Rugby league | Cairns |
| Browne Park | 8,000 | Rugby league | Rockhampton |
| Cairns Convention Centre | 5,300 | Basketball | Cairns |
| Carrara Indoor Stadium | 3,000 | Basketball | Gold Coast |
| Carrara Stadium | 25,000 | Aussie rules football | Gold Coast |
| Cazalys Stadium | 14,000 | Cricket, Rugby league, Aussie rules football | Cairns |
| Clive Berghofer Stadium | 9,000 | Rugby league | Toowoomba |
| Endeavour Park | 10,000 | Cricket | Townsville |
| Gold Coast Convention & Exhibition Centre | 6,000 | Basketball | Gold Coast |
| Gold Coast Iceland | 400 | Ice Hockey, Speed Skating, Figure Skating | Gold Coast |
| Harrup Park | 10,000 | Cricket | Mackay |
| Heritage Oval | 10,000 | Cricket | Toowoomba |
| Morgan Park | ?? | Equestrian events, Motorsport | Warwick |
| Newtown Oval | 10,000 | Rugby league | Maryborough |
| Queensland Raceway | 30,000 | Motorsport | Ipswich |
| Reid Park Street Circuit | 60,000 | Motorsport | Townsville |
| Robina Stadium | 25,000 | Rugby league | Gold Coast |
| Roy Henzell Oval | 10,000 | Cricket | Sunshine Coast |
| Salter Oval | 10,000 | Cricket | Bundaberg |
| Sunshine Coast Stadium | 12,000 | Rugby league, Rugby Union, Football (soccer) | Sunshine Coast |
| Surfers Paradise Street Circuit | 120,000 | Motorsport | Gold Coast |
| Tony Ireland Stadium | 10,000+ | Cricket and Rugby league | Townsville |
| Townsville Entertainment Centre | 5,260 | Basketball | Townsville |
| USC Stadium | 3,000 | Netball | Sunshine Coast |
| Willowbank Raceway | 30,000 | Drag Racing | Ipswich |
| Willows Sports Complex (demolished) | 25,000 | Rugby league | Townsville |
| North Queensland Stadium | 25,000 | Rugby league | Townsville |

== See also ==
- Sport in Brisbane
- Sports on the Gold Coast, Queensland
- Rugby league in Queensland
