= Duncan Arnolda =

Sri Lankan cricketer (born 1975)

Personal information
- Full name: Duncan Fredrick Arnolda
- Born: 20 August 1976 (age 50); Kandy, Sri Lanka
- Source: Cricinfo, 21 April 2021

Duncan Arnolda (born 17 January 1975) is a Sri Lankan former cricketer. He played in 110 first-class and 56 List A matches between 1994/95 and 2009/10. He made his Twenty20 debut on 17 August 2004, for Burgher Recreation Club in the 2004 SLC Twenty20 Tournament.
