= Sunnie Chan =

New Zealand cricketer (born 1982)

Personal information
- Full name: Sunnie Percival Chan
- Born: 4 February 1982 (age 44); Wellington, New Zealand
- Batting: Right-handed
- Bowling: Right-arm medium-fast

Domestic team information
- Years: Team
- 2005/06–2006/07: Canterbury
- 2009/10: Wellington

Career statistics
Competition	First-class	List A
Matches	3	8
Runs scored	52	18
Batting average	13.00	6.00
100s/50s	0/0	0/0
Top score	35*	7*
Balls bowled	447	270
Wickets	6	3
Bowling average	48.16	103.00
5 wickets in innings	0	0
10 wickets in match	0	0
Best bowling	3/58	1/21
Catches/stumpings	1/–	2/–
- Source: Cricinfo, 26 February 2019

Sunnie Percival Chan (born 4 February 1982) is a New Zealand former cricketer who played first-class and List A cricket for Canterbury and Wellington between 2006 and 2010.
