= Michael Barry (cricketer) =

New Zealand cricketer (born 1991)

Personal information
- Born: 16 March 1991 (age 35); Auckland, New Zealand
- Batting: Left-handed
- Bowling: Left-arm medium

Domestic team information
- Years: Team
- 2012/13—2018/19: Auckland
- Source: Cricketarchive, 23 February 2017

Michael Barry (born 16 March 1991) is a New Zealand cricketer. He plays first-class and List A cricket for Auckland. He made his Twenty20 debut for Auckland on 4 December 2016 in the 2016–17 Super Smash. In September 2018, he was named in the Auckland Aces' squad for the 2018 Abu Dhabi T20 Trophy.
