= Simon Roberts (Herefordshire cricketer) =

English cricketer

Personal information
- Full name: Simon Andrew Roberts
- Born: 7 February 1983 (age 43); Nottingham, Nottinghamshire, England
- Batting: Right-handed
- Bowling: Right-arm medium

Domestic team information
- Years: Team
- 2002–2009: Herefordshire

Career statistics
Competition	LA
Matches	3
Runs scored	5
Batting average	2.50
100s/50s	–/–
Top score	3
Balls bowled	138
Wickets	5
Bowling average	18.40
5 wickets in innings	–
10 wickets in match	–
Best bowling	3/36
Catches/stumpings	–/–
- Source: Cricinfo, 4 November 2010

Simon Andrew Roberts (born 7 February 1983) is an English cricketer. Roberts is a right-handed batsman who bowls right-arm medium pace. He was born at Nottingham, Nottinghamshire.

Roberts made his debut for Herefordshire against Wales Minor Counties in the 2002 Minor Counties Championship. From 2002 to 2009, he represented the county in 20 Minor Counties Championship matches, the last of which came against Wiltshire. He also represented Herefordshire in the MCCA Knockout Trophy. His debut in that competition came against the Gloucestershire Cricket Board in 2002. He represented Herefordshire in 8 further Trophy matches, the last of which came against Wiltshire in 2008.

Roberts also represented the county in 3 List A matches. The first of these came against the Durham Cricket Board in the 1st round of the 2003 Cheltenham & Gloucester Trophy which was played in 2002. The following 2 matches came against Oxfordshire in the 1st round of the 2004 Cheltenham & Gloucester Trophy which was played in 2003 and against Worcestershire in the 2nd round of the same competition, this time played in 2004. In his 3 List A matches, he took 5 wickets at a bowling average of 18.40, with best figures of 3/36.

He currently plays club cricket for Clifton Village Cricket Club in the Nottinghamshire Cricket Board Premier League.
