= Tim Papps =

New Zealand cricketer (born 1981)

Personal information
- Born: 22 April 1981 (age 45); Christchurch, New Zealand
- Source: Cricinfo, 20 October 2020

Tim Papps (born 22 April 1981) is a New Zealand cricketer. He played in seven first-class matches for Canterbury in 2004 and 2005.

== See also ==
- List of Canterbury representative cricketers
