= Hanri Strydom =

South African cricketer (born 1980)

Personal information
- Full name: Hanri Strydom
- Born: 7 November 1980 (age 46); Cape Province, South Africa
- Batting: Right-handed
- Bowling: Right-arm medium
- Role: All-rounder

International information
- National side: South Africa (2000–2004)
- ODI debut (cap 29): 30 November 2000 v India
- Last ODI: 29 February 2004 v England

Domestic team information
- Years: Team
- 2003/04: Northerns
- 2004/05–2005/06: Limpopo

Career statistics
Competition	WODI	WLA
Matches	8	20
Runs scored	122	566
Batting average	17.42	35.37
100s/50s	0/0	1/2
Top score	46	114*
Balls bowled	140	672
Wickets	3	13
Bowling average	42.33	29.69
5 wickets in innings	0	0
10 wickets in match	0	0
Best bowling	3/33	4/20
Catches/stumpings	2/–	4/–
- Source: CricketArchive, 25 February 2022

Hanri Strydom (born 7 November 1980) is a South African former cricketer who played as an all-rounder, batting right-handed and bowling right-arm medium. She appeared in eight One Day Internationals for South Africa between 2000 and 2004. She played domestic cricket for Northerns and Limpopo.

She also represented South Africa in Indoor Cricket after her international career.
