= Leigh Kelly =

New Zealand cricketer (born 1974)

Personal information
- Born: 27 August 1974 (age 52); Palmerston North, New Zealand
- Source: Cricinfo, 24 October 2020

Leigh Kelly (born 27 August 1974) is a New Zealand cricketer. He played in two first-class matches for Wellington in 1998/99.

== See also ==
- List of Wellington representative cricketers
