= Kirsten Blair =

South African cricketer (born 1984)

Personal information
- Full name: Kirsten Blair
- Born: 29 July 1984 (age 42); Boksburg, Transvaal, South Africa
- Batting: Right-handed
- Bowling: Right-arm medium
- Role: All-rounder

International information
- National side: South Africa (2007)
- ODI debut (cap 50): 24 January 2007 v Pakistan
- Last ODI: 28 January 2007 v Pakistan

Domestic team information
- Years: Team
- 2003/04: Easterns
- 2004/05–2010/11: Gauteng

Career statistics
Competition	WODI	WLA
Matches	2	34
Runs scored	2	702
Batting average	2.00	31.90
100s/50s	0/0	1/2
Top score	2	138*
Balls bowled	60	1,322
Wickets	1	58
Bowling average	32.00	11.50
5 wickets in innings	0	4
10 wickets in match	0	0
Best bowling	1/32	7/31
Catches/stumpings	0/–	18/–
- Source: CricketArchive, 21 February 2022

Kirsten Blair (born 29 July 1984) is a South African former cricketer who played as an all-rounder, batting right-handed and bowling right-arm medium. She appeared in two One Day Internationals for South Africa in 2007, both against Pakistan. She played domestic cricket for Easterns and Gauteng, as well as appearing in one tour match for Northerns.
