= Rikki-Lee Rimmington =

Australian cricketer (born 1985)

Personal information
- Born: 22 June 1985 (age 41); Redcliffe, Queensland, Australia
- Batting: Right-handed
- Bowling: Right-arm fast-medium
- Role: Bowler
- Relatives: Nathan Rimmington (brother)

Domestic team information
- Years: Team
- 2003/04–2007/08: Queensland

Career statistics
Competition	WLA	WT20
Matches	34	1
Runs scored	45	0
Batting average	6.42	–
100s/50s	0/0	0/0
Top score	10	0
Balls bowled	1,377	24
Wickets	24	0
Bowling average	37.04	–
5 wickets in innings	0	–
10 wickets in match	0	–
Best bowling	3/38	–
Catches/stumpings	1/–	0/–
- Source: CricketArchive, 5 July 2021

Rikki-Lee Rimmington (born 22 June 1985) is a former Australian cricketer. A right-arm fast-medium bowler, she represented Queensland in 34 List A matches in the Women's National Cricket League (WNCL) between the 2003–04 and 2007–08 seasons.

Rimmington was born in Redcliffe, Queensland. Her older brother Nathan is also a cricketer.
