= Sarah Fogwill =

English cricketer

Sarah Louise Fogwill (born September 1988) was a Hampshire Women's cricketer . Fogwill was right-handed batsman who bowls right arm medium.

Fogwill made her debut for Sussex in the Sussex U13's in 2002. She captained Sussex U15s and U17s to County Championship titles, as well as Senior Championship winner. Sarah successfully played for all junior ages groups and made her debut for the Senior XI under the captaincy of Alexia Walker in 2007.

In 2009 Fogwill moved cross borders to play for the Hampshire Women's Senior XI. Making her debut against Scotland in 2009, Fogwill went on to be an important all rounder, captaining Hampshire in the 2009 and 2011 seasons.

Sarah captained and coached Brighton and Hove Ladies Cricket club from 2013-2018.

In 2011 Fogwill played for England in the Indoor cricket World Cup, South Africa. Following this she wrote a book for Teachers and Coaches, helping them to improve the younger generation of Cricketers. In 2017 Fogwill played for England in the Indoor cricket World Cup, Dubai. Later that year she retired undefeated Tree Tops National indoor player for over 5 years.

Sarah officially retired in 2020 after training, playing and coaching with Qatar Cricket team.

Sarah went on to teach and coach cricket abroad.

Sarah published her book KS1 AND KS2 Cricket book worldwide in 2012 with all proceeds going to charity.

== Club career ==
Sarah currently plays and captains Brighton and Hove and plays for Derby indoor cricket team.

Sarah had her book "KS1 and KS2 Cricket".

Sarah subsequently went on to teach abroad and returned after 4 years.

== Overseas ==
Fogwill played a season for Old Boys Collegians Cricket Club Women's First XI in Christchurch, New Zealand in 2007-2008 as a batting alrounder.
