= Dilshan Vitharana =

Sri Lankan cricketer (born 1978)

Cricket information
- Batting: Left-handed
- Role: Wicketkeeper-batsman

Career statistics
Competition	First-class	List A
Matches	108	66
Runs scored	4,061	1,280
Batting average	24.31	21.33
100s/50s	3/18	0/5
Top score	158	87*
Catches/stumpings	210/54	62/19
- Source: CricketArchive, 9 September 2022

Dorake Witharanage Ashana Niroshan Dilshan Vitharana (born 13 May 1978), more commonly known as Dilshan Vitharana, is a Sri Lankan cricketer. A wicket-keeper-batsman, he made his debut in the 1997–98 season for the Sri Lankan Under-19 team during India's tour of the country, and went on to play first-class and List A cricket for Colts Cricket Club, Moors Sports Club and Burgher Recreation Club.
