= West Indies women's cricket team in Sri Lanka in 2024 =

International cricket tour

	Sri Lanka	West Indies
- Dates: 15 – 28 June 2024
Captains	Chamari Athapaththu	Hayley Matthews (Note: Shemaine Campbelle captained West Indies in the second and third ODIs.)

One Day International series
- Results: Sri Lanka won the 3-match series 3–0
Most runs	Vishmi Gunaratne (134)	Chedean Nation (64)
Most wickets	Kavisha Dilhari (7)	Karishma Ramharack (4)
- Player of the series: Vishmi Gunaratne (SL)

Twenty20 International series
- Results: West Indies won the 3-match series 2–1
Most runs	Harshitha Samarawickrama (77)	Hayley Matthews (108)
Most wickets	Chamari Athapaththu (5)	Afy Fletcher (8)
- Player of the series: Hayley Matthews (WI)

The West Indies women's cricket team toured Sri Lanka in June 2024 to play three One Day International (ODI) and three Twenty20 International (T20I) matches against Sri Lanka. The ODI series formed part of the 2022–2025 ICC Women's Championship. The T20I series formed part of both teams' preparation ahead of the 2024 ICC Women's T20 World Cup tournament, and served as part of Sri Lanka's preparation for the 2024 Women's Twenty20 Asia Cup. In May 2024, Sri Lanka Cricket (SLC) confirmed the fixtures for the tour.

Originally the ODI series was scheduled to be played at the Galle International Stadium in Galle. However, it was later shifted to the Mahinda Rajapaksa International Cricket Stadium in Hambantota.

Sri Lanka won the first and second ODI by 6 wickets and 5 wickets respectively, and seal the series 2–0. It was Sri Lanka's first series win over the West Indies in the format since their series in 2008. Sri Lanka won the third and last ODI by 160 runs and won the ODI series 3–0, securing a whitewash.

In the first T20I, Sri Lanka won by 4 wickets thanks to career-best bowling figures from Chamari Athapaththu. This was their first victory over West Indies in the format since West Indies' tour in 2015. A four-wicket haul by Afy Fletcher helped West Indies level the series by winning the rain-affected second T20I. Shemaine Campbelle's unbeaten 41 runs Hayley Matthews's 49 runs helped West Indies to win the T20I series 2–1 by winning the third T20I by 6 wickets.

== Squads ==
Sri Lanka		West Indies
ODIs	T20Is	ODIs and T20Is
Chamari Athapaththu (c); Nilakshi de Silva; Kavisha Dilhari; Vishmi Gunaratne; Hansima Karunaratne; Kawya Kavindi; Achini Kulasuriya; Sugandika Kumari; Sachini Nisansala; Hasini Perera; Udeshika Prabodhani; Inoshi Priyadharshani; Oshadi Ranasinghe; Inoka Ranaweera; Harshitha Samarawickrama; Anushka Sanjeewani (wk)	Chamari Athapaththu (c); Nilakshi de Silva; Kavisha Dilhari; Imesha Dulani; Shashini Gimhani; Vishmi Gunaratne; Ama Kanchana; Kawya Kavindi; Sugandika Kumari; Sachini Nisansala; Kaushini Nuthyangana (wk); Hasini Perera; Inoshi Priyadharshani; Oshadi Ranasinghe; Harshitha Samarawickrama; Rashmika Sewwandi	Hayley Matthews (c); Shemaine Campbelle (vc, wk); Aaliyah Alleyne; Shamilia Connell; Afy Fletcher; Cherry-Ann Fraser; Shabika Gajnabi; Chinelle Henry; Zaida James; Qiana Joseph; Chedean Nation; Karishma Ramharack; Stafanie Taylor; Rashada Williams (wk); Kate Wilmott

== ODI series ==
=== 1st ODI ===
15 June 2024
10:00
Scorecard

West Indies; 195 (47.1 overs)	v	Sri Lanka; 198/4 (34.1 overs)
Hayley Matthews 38 (53); Sugandika Kumari 3/30 (9 overs)		Harshitha Samarawickrama 44* (53); Aaliyah Alleyne 2/22 (6 overs)

Sri Lanka won by 6 wickets
Mahinda Rajapaksa International Cricket Stadium, Hambantota
Umpires: Lauren Agenbag (SA) and Dedunu Silva (SL)
Player of the match: Harshitha Samarawickrama (SL)

- Sri Lanka won the toss and elected to field.
- Women's Championship points: Sri Lanka 2, West Indies 0.

=== 2nd ODI ===
18 June 2024
10:00
Scorecard

West Indies; 92 (31 overs)	v	Sri Lanka; 93/5 (21.2 overs)
Rashada Williams 24 (62); Kavisha Dilhari 4/20 (6 overs)		Vishmi Gunaratne 50 (50); Karishma Ramharack 2/29 (5.2 overs)

Sri Lanka won by 5 wickets
Mahinda Rajapaksa International Cricket Stadium, Hambantota
Umpires: Lauren Agenbag (SA) and Lyndon Hannibal (SL)
Player of the match: Kavisha Dilhari (SL)

- West Indies won the toss and elected to bat.
- Women's Championship points: Sri Lanka 2, West Indies 0.

=== 3rd ODI ===
21 June 2024
10:00
Scorecard

Sri Lanka; 275/6 (50 overs)	v	West Indies; 115 (34.5 overs)
Chamari Athapaththu 91 (106); Karishma Ramharack 2/46 (10 overs)		Chedean Nation 46 (57); Sachini Nisansala 5/28 (5.5 overs)

Sri Lanka won by 160 runs
Mahinda Rajapaksa International Cricket Stadium, Hambantota
Umpires: Lauren Agenbag (SA) and Dedunu Silva (SL)
Player of the match: Sachini Nisansala (SL)

- West Indies won the toss and elected to field.
- Women's Championship points: Sri Lanka 2, West Indies 0.

== T20I series ==
=== 1st T20I ===
24 June 2024
10:00
Scorecard

West Indies; 134/8 (20 overs)	v	Sri Lanka; 137/6 (18.4 overs)
Hayley Matthews 30 (30); Chamari Athapaththu 4/29 (4 overs)		Vishmi Gunaratne 35 (25); Afy Fletcher 2/29 (4 overs)

Sri Lanka won by 4 wickets
Mahinda Rajapaksa International Cricket Stadium, Hambantota
Umpires: Lauren Agenbag (SA) and Prageeth Rambukwella (SL)

- Sri Lanka won the toss and elected to field.

=== 2nd T20I ===
26 June 2024
10:00
Scorecard

Sri Lanka; 89/4 (15.2 overs)	v	West Indies; 99/4 (14.1 overs)
Chamari Athapaththu 26 (25); Afy Fletcher 4/23 (3.2 overs)		Hayley Matthews 29 (29); Chamari Athapaththu 1/18 (2.1 overs)

West Indies won by 6 wickets (DLS method)
Mahinda Rajapaksa International Cricket Stadium, Hambantota
Umpires: Lauren Agenbag (SA) and Nimali Perera (SL)

- West Indies won the toss and elected to field.
- West Indies were set a revised target of 99 runs from 15 overs due to rain.

=== 3rd T20I ===
28 June 2024
10:00
Scorecard

Sri Lanka; 141/7 (20 overs)	v	West Indies; 142/4 (19.5 overs)
Chamari Athapaththu 38 (38); Aaliyah Alleyne 2/25 (4 overs); Afy Fletcher 2/25 (4 overs)		Hayley Matthews 49 (40); Kawya Kavindi 2/27 (3.5 overs)

West Indies won by 6 wickets
Mahinda Rajapaksa International Cricket Stadium, Hambantota
Umpires: Lauren Agenbag (SA) and Dedunu Silva (SL)
Player of the match: Shemaine Campbelle (WI)

- West Indies won the toss and elected to field.
- Chamari Athapaththu (SL) scored her 3,000th run in women's T20Is.
- Stafanie Taylor (WI) scored her 9,000th run in international cricket.
