= New Zealand women's cricket team in Sri Lanka in 2023 =

International cricket tour

	Sri Lanka	New Zealand
- Dates: 27 June 2023 – 12 July 2023
Captains	Chamari Athapaththu	Sophie Devine

One Day International series
- Results: Sri Lanka won the 3-match series 2–1
Most runs	Chamari Athapaththu (248)	Sophie Devine (194)
Most wickets	Oshadi Ranasinghe (4)	Lea Tahuhu (5)
- Player of the series: Chamari Athapaththu (SL)

Twenty20 International series
- Results: New Zealand won the 3-match series 2–1
Most runs	Harshitha Samarawickrama (84)	Suzie Bates (133)
Most wickets	Inoka Ranaweera (4); Inoshi Priyadharshani (4)	Lea Tahuhu (4)
- Player of the series: Suzie Bates (NZ)

The New Zealand women's cricket team toured Sri Lanka in June and July 2023 to play three One Day International (ODI) and three Twenty20 International (T20I) matches. The ODI series formed part of the 2022–2025 ICC Women's Championship. It was the New Zealand women's side's first tour to Sri Lanka as a bilateral series. On 18 May 2023, Sri Lanka Cricket (SLC) announced the schedule of the tour.

Sri Lanka won the ODI series 2–1. It was Sri Lanka's first bilateral series victory over New Zealand.

== Squads ==
Sri Lanka	New Zealand
Chamari Athapaththu (c); Nilakshi de Silva; Kavisha Dilhari; Imesha Dulani; Vishmi Gunaratne; Hansima Karunaratne; Kawya Kavindi; Sugandika Kumari; Hasini Perera; Udeshika Prabodhani; Inoshi Priyadharshani; Oshadi Ranasinghe; Inoka Ranaweera; Harshitha Samarawickrama; Anushka Sanjeewani (wk)	Sophie Devine (c); Suzie Bates; Bernadine Bezuidenhout (wk); Eden Carson; Izzy Gaze (wk); Maddy Green (wk); Brooke Halliday; Fran Jonas; Leigh Kasperek; Amelia Kerr; ~~Jess Kerr~~; Rosemary Mair; Molly Penfold; Georgia Plimmer; Hannah Rowe; Lea Tahuhu

On 19 June 2023, Jess Kerr was ruled out of the tour with a broken toe. Leigh Kasperek was named in New Zealand's squad as her replacement.

== ODI series ==
=== 1st ODI ===
27 June 2023
10:00
Scorecard

New Zealand; 170/5 (28 overs)	v	Sri Lanka; 172/1 (27 overs)
Amelia Kerr 40 (51); Kavisha Dilhari 1/26 (5 overs)		Chamari Athapaththu 108* (83); Sophie Devine 1/20 (4 overs)

Sri Lanka won by 9 wickets (DLS method)
Galle International Stadium, Galle
Umpires: Gamini Dissanayake (SL) and Nimali Perera (SL)
Player of the match: Chamari Athapaththu (SL)

- New Zealand won the toss and elected to bat.
- Sri Lanka were set a revised target of 172 runs from 28 overs due to rain.
- This was Sri Lanka's first win against New Zealand in women's ODIs.
- Women's Championship points: Sri Lanka 2, New Zealand 0.

=== 2nd ODI ===
30 June 2023
10:00
Scorecard

New Zealand; 329/7 (50 overs)	v	Sri Lanka; 218 (48.4 overs)
Sophie Devine 137 (121); Oshadi Ranasinghe 3/68 (10 overs)		Kavisha Dilhari 84 (98); Lea Tahuhu 4/31 (8 overs)

New Zealand won by 111 runs
Galle International Stadium, Galle
Umpires: Shantha Fonseka (SL) and Dedunu Silva (SL)
Player of the match: Sophie Devine (NZ)

- New Zealand won the toss and elected to bat.
- Women's Championship points: New Zealand 2, Sri Lanka 0.

=== 3rd ODI ===
3 July 2023
10:00
Scorecard

New Zealand; 127/2 (31 overs)	v	Sri Lanka; 196/2 (26.5 overs)
Suzie Bates 63* (87); Oshadi Ranasinghe 1/22 (5 overs)		Chamari Athapaththu 140* (80); Lea Tahuhu 1/29 (6 overs)

Sri Lanka won by 8 wickets (DLS method)
Galle International Stadium, Galle
Umpires: Ranmore Martinesz (SL) and Nimali Perera (SL)
Player of the match: Chamari Athapaththu (SL)

- New Zealand won the toss and elected to bat.
- Sri Lanka were set a revised target of 196 runs from 29 overs due to rain.
- Women's Championship points: Sri Lanka 2, New Zealand 0.

== T20I series ==
=== 1st T20I ===
8 July 2023
10:00
Scorecard

Sri Lanka; 106/9 (20 overs)	v	New Zealand; 107/5 (18.5 overs)
Vishmi Gunaratne 26 (28); Amelia Kerr 2/18 (4 overs)		Suzie Bates 44 (47); Inoshi Priyadharshani 3/17 (4 overs)

New Zealand won by 5 wickets
P. Sara Oval, Colombo
Umpires: Chamara de Soysa (SL) and Dedunu Silva (SL)
Player of the match: Suzie Bates (NZ)

- New Zealand won the toss and elected to field.

=== 2nd T20I ===
10 July 2023
10:00
Scorecard

Sri Lanka; 118/6 (20 overs)	v	New Zealand; 119/2 (18.4 overs)
Hasini Perera 33 (36); Lea Tahuhu 4/21 (4 overs)		Suzie Bates 52 (53); Kavisha Dilhari 1/22 (3 overs)

New Zealand won by 8 wickets
P. Sara Oval, Colombo
Umpires: Ravindra Kottahachchi (SL) and Nimali Perera (SL)
Player of the match: Lea Tahuhu (NZ)

- New Zealand won the toss and elected to field.

=== 3rd T20I ===
12 July 2023
10:00
Scorecard

New Zealand; 140/9 (20 overs)	v	Sri Lanka; 143/0 (14.3 overs)
Sophie Devine 46 (25); Inoka Ranaweera 3/15 (4 overs)		Chamari Athapaththu 80* (47)

Sri Lanka won by 10 wickets
P. Sara Oval, Colombo
Umpires: Chandrika Amarasinghe (SL) and Dedunu Silva (SL)
Player of the match: Chamari Athapaththu (SL)

- Sri Lanka won the toss and elected to field.
- Imesha Dulani (SL) made her T20I debut.
