= 2024 Women's Twenty20 Asia Cup =

Cricket tournament

- Dates: 19 – 28 July 2024
- Administrator: Asian Cricket Council
- Cricket format: Women's Twenty20 International
- Tournament format(s): Group round-robin and knockout
- Host: Sri Lanka
- Champions: Sri Lanka (1st title)
- Runners-up: India
- Participants: 8
- Matches: 15
- Player of the series: (Sri Lanka) Chamari Athapaththu
- Most runs: (Sri Lanka) Chamari Athapaththu (304)
- Most wickets: (India) Deepti Sharma (10)

The 2024 Women's Twenty20 Asia Cup was the ninth edition of the Women's Asia Cup, with the matches played as Twenty20 International (T20I) matches. In January 2023, the Asian Cricket Council (ACC) announced the pathway structure and calendar for 2023 and 2024, where they confirmed the dates and teams of the tournament.

The tournament was played by eight teams at the end of July 2024. The four full members of the Asian Cricket Council – Bangladesh, India, Pakistan and Sri Lanka – qualified automatically. It was originally announced that they would be joined by the finalists from the 2024 ACC Women's Premier Cup (Malaysia and United Arab Emirates); however, in March 2024, the ACC announced that they would be joined by the semi-finalists from the Women's Premier Cup, thus also including Nepal and Thailand. In the final, Sri Lanka defeated India by 8 wickets to win their maiden Asia Cup title.

== Teams and qualifications ==
| Means of qualification | Date | Host | Berths | Qualified |
|---|---|---|---|---|
| ICC full membership | —N/a | —N/a | 4 | Bangladesh; India; Pakistan; Sri Lanka |
| 2024 Premier Cup | February 2024 | Malaysia | 4 | Malaysia; Nepal; Thailand; United Arab Emirates |
| Total | | | 8 | |

== Squads ==
| Bangladesh | India | Malaysia | Nepal |
|---|---|---|---|
| Nigar Sultana (c, wk); Nahida Akter (vc); Rumana Ahmed; Dilara Akter (wk); Marufa Akter; Shorna Akter; Jahanara Alam; Rubya Haider; Rabeya Khan; Murshida Khatun; Shorifa Khatun; Sultana Khatun; Ritu Moni; Sabikun Nahar; Ishma Tanjim | Harmanpreet Kaur (c) (Note: Smriti Mandhana captained India in their third match of the group stage.); Smriti Mandhana (vc); Uma Chetry (wk); Richa Ghosh (wk); Dayalan Hemalatha; Tanuja Kanwar; Shreyanka Patil; Arundhati Reddy; Jemimah Rodrigues; Sajeevan Sajana; Deepti Sharma; Renuka Singh; Asha Sobhana; Pooja Vastrakar; Shafali Verma; Radha Yadav | Winifred Duraisingam (c); Nur Aishah; Aisya Eleesa; Mas Elysa; Ainna Hamizah Hashim; Elsa Hunter; Mahirah Izzati Ismail; Wan Julia (wk); Suabika Manivannan; Dhanusri Muhunan; Irdina Beh Nabil; Aina Najwa (wk); Nur Arianna Natsya; Amalin Sorfina; Nur Izzatul Syafiqa | Indu Barma (c); Rajmati Airee; Dolly Bhatta; Mamta Chaudhary (wk); Rubina Chhetry; Kabita Joshi; Samjhana Khadka; Kabita Kunwar; Sita Rana Magar; Puja Mahato; Kritika Marasini; Sabnam Rai; Bindu Rawal; Kajal Shrestha (wk); Roma Thapa |
| Pakistan | Sri Lanka | Thailand | United Arab Emirates |
| Nida Dar (c); Muneeba Ali (wk); Najiha Alvi (wk); Sidra Ameen; Diana Baig; Gull Feroza; Tuba Hassan; Sadia Iqbal; Iram Javed; Aliya Riaz; Tasmia Rubab; Fatima Sana; Nashra Sandhu; Syeda Aroob Shah; Omaima Sohail | Chamari Athapaththu (c); Nilakshi de Silva; Kavisha Dilhari; Shashini Gimhani; Vishmi Gunaratne; Ama Kanchana; Kawya Kavindi; Achini Kulasuriya; Sugandika Kumari; Sachini Nisansala; Inoshi Priyadharshani; Hasini Perera; Udeshika Prabodhani; Anushka Sanjeewani (wk); Harshitha Samarawickrama | Thipatcha Putthawong (c); Nattaya Boochatham; Kanyakoran Bunthansen; Nannaphat Chaihan; Sunida Chaturongrattana; Onnicha Kamchomphu; Rosenanee Kanoh; Suwanan Khiaoto (wk); Nannapat Koncharoenkai (wk); Suleeporn Laomi; Phannita Maya; Chayanisa Phengpaen; Chanida Sutthiruang; Aphisara Suwanchonrathi; Koranit Suwanchonrathi | Esha Oza (c, wk); Samaira Dharnidharka; Heena Hotchandani; Lavanya Keny; Kavisha Egodage; Suraksha Kotte; Vaishnave Mahesh; Indhuja Nandakumar; Rinitha Rajith; Rishitha Rajith; Rithika Rajith; Khushi Sharma; Theertha Satish (wk); Emily Thomas; Mehak Thakur |

Bangladesh named Taj Nehar, Fahima Khatun, Sobhana Mostary and Puja Chakraborty as standby players. India named Shweta Sehrawat, Saika Ishaque, Tanuja Kanwar and Meghna Singh as traveling reserves. On 21 July 2024, Shreyanka Patil was ruled out of the remaining matches of the tournament with a fractured finger, Tanuja Kanwar was named as her replacement.

== Group stage ==
=== Group A ===
==== Points table ====
| Pos | Team | Pld | W | L | T | NR | Pts | NRR | Qualification |
|---|---|---|---|---|---|---|---|---|---|
| 1 | India | 3 | 3 | 0 | 0 | 0 | 6 | 3.615 | Advanced to the semi-finals |
| 2 | Pakistan | 3 | 2 | 1 | 0 | 0 | 4 | 1.102 | Advanced to the semi-finals |
| 3 | Nepal | 3 | 1 | 2 | 0 | 0 | 2 | −2.042 | |
| 4 | United Arab Emirates | 3 | 0 | 3 | 0 | 0 | 0 | −2.780 | |

Source: ESPNcricinfo

==== Fixtures ====
19 July 2024
14:00
Scorecard

| United Arab Emirates; 115/8 (20 overs) | v | Nepal; 118/4 (16.1 overs) |
| Khushi Sharma 36 (39); Indu Barma 3/19 (4 overs) | | Samjhana Khadka 72* (45); Kavisha Egodage 3/12 (4 overs) |

Nepal won by 6 wickets
Rangiri Dambulla International Stadium, Dambulla
Umpires: Saleema Imtiaz (Pak) and Gayathri Venugopalan (Ind)
Player of the match: Samjhana Khadka (Nep)

- Nepal won the toss and elected to field.
- This was the first victory in Asia Cup for Nepal.

19 July 2024
19:00 (N)
Scorecard

| Pakistan; 108 (19.2 overs) | v | India; 112/3 (14.1 overs) |
| Sidra Ameen 25 (35); Deepti Sharma 3/20 (4 overs) | | Smriti Mandhana 45 (31); Syeda Aroob Shah 2/9 (3 overs) |

India won by 7 wickets
Rangiri Dambulla International Stadium, Dambulla
Umpires: Shathira Jakir (Ban) and Nimali Perera (SL)
Player of the match: Deepti Sharma (Ind)

- Pakistan won the toss and elected to bat.
- Nida Dar (Pak) played in her 150th T20I match.
- Deepti Sharma became the second Indian women's cricketer to take 250 wickets in international cricket.
- Jemimah Rodrigues became the youngest Indian women's cricketer to score 2,000 runs in women's T20Is.

21 July 2024
14:00
Scorecard

| India; 201/5 (20 overs) | v | United Arab Emirates; 123/7 (20 overs) |
| Harmanpreet Kaur 66 (47); Kavisha Egodage 2/36 (4 overs) | | Kavisha Egodage 40* (32); Deepti Sharma 2/23 (4 overs) |

India won by 78 runs
Rangiri Dambulla International Stadium, Dambulla
Umpires: Shathira Jakir (Ban) and Nimali Perera (SL)
Player of the match: Richa Ghosh (Ind)

- United Arab Emirates won the toss and elected to field.
- Tanuja Kanwar (Ind) made her T20I debut.
- India recorded the highest team total in Women’s Twenty20 Asia Cup. and this was also India's highest total in women's T20Is.

21 July 2024
19:00 (N)
Scorecard

| Nepal; 108/6 (20 overs) | v | Pakistan; 110/1 (11.5 overs) |
| Kabita Joshi 31* (23); Sadia Iqbal 2/19 (4 overs) | | Gull Feroza 57 (35); Kabita Joshi 1/19 (1.5 overs) |

Pakistan won by 9 wickets
Rangiri Dambulla International Stadium, Dambulla
Umpires: Hemangi Yerzal (UAE) and Gayathri Venugopalan (Ind)
Player of the match: Gull Feroza (Pak)

- Pakistan won the toss and elected to field.

23 July 2024
14:00
Scorecard

| United Arab Emirates; 103/8 (20 overs) | v | Pakistan; 107/0 (14.1 overs) |
| Theertha Satish 40 (36); Tuba Hassan 2/17 (3 overs) | | Gull Feroza 62* (55) |

Pakistan won by 10 wickets
Rangiri Dambulla International Stadium, Dambulla
Umpires: Nur Hijrah (Mas) and Vrinda Rathi (Ind)
Player of the match: Gull Feroza (Pak)

- Pakistan won the toss and elected to field.

23 July 2024
19:00 (N)
Scorecard

| India; 178/3 (20 overs) | v | Nepal; 96/9 (20 overs) |
| Shafali Verma 81 (48); Sita Rana Magar 2/25 (4 overs) | | Sita Rana Magar 18 (22); Deepti Sharma 3/13 (4 overs) |

India won by 82 runs
Rangiri Dambulla International Stadium, Dambulla
Umpires: Saleema Imtiaz (Pak) and Nimali Perera (SL)
Player of the match: Shafali Verma (Ind)

- India won the toss and elected to bat.
- Shafali Verma (Ind) scored her 3,000th run in international cricket.

=== Group B ===
==== Points Table ====
| Pos | Team | Pld | W | L | T | NR | Pts | NRR | Qualification |
|---|---|---|---|---|---|---|---|---|---|
| 1 | Sri Lanka (H) | 3 | 3 | 0 | 0 | 0 | 6 | 3.988 | Advanced to the semi-finals |
| 2 | Bangladesh | 3 | 2 | 1 | 0 | 0 | 4 | 1.971 | Advanced to the semi-finals |
| 3 | Thailand | 3 | 1 | 2 | 0 | 0 | 2 | −0.858 | |
| 4 | Malaysia | 3 | 0 | 3 | 0 | 0 | 0 | −4.667 | |

Source: ESPNcricinfo
(H) Host

==== Fixtures ====
20 July 2024
14:00
Scorecard

| Thailand; 133/6 (20 overs) | v | Malaysia; 111/8 (20 overs) |
| Nannapat Koncharoenkai 40 (35); Mahirah Izzati Ismail 3/16 (4 overs) | | Wan Julia 52 (53); Onnicha Kamchomphu 2/20 (4 overs) |

Thailand won by 22 runs
Rangiri Dambulla International Stadium, Dambulla
Umpires: Dedunu Silva (SL) and Hemangi Yerzal (UAE)
Player of the match: Nannapat Koncharoenkai (Tha)

- Thailand won the toss and elected to bat.
- Nannaphat Chaihan (Tha) and Suabika Manivannan (Mas) both made their T20I debuts.

20 July 2024
19:00 (N)
Scorecard

| Bangladesh; 111/8 (20 overs) | v | Sri Lanka; 114/3 (17.1 overs) |
| Nigar Sultana 48* (59); Inoshi Priyadharshani 2/17 (4 overs) | | Vishmi Gunaratne 51 (48); Nahida Akter 3/12 (4 overs) |

Sri Lanka won by 7 wickets
Rangiri Dambulla International Stadium, Dambulla
Umpires: Nur Hijrah (Mas) and Vrinda Rathi (Ind)
Player of the match: Vishmi Gunaratne (SL)

- Bangladesh won the toss and elected to bat.
- Ishma Tanjim (Ban) made her T20I debut.

22 July 2024
14:00
Scorecard

| Sri Lanka; 184/4 (20 overs) | v | Malaysia; 40 (19.5 overs) |
| Chamari Athapaththu 119* (69); Winifred Duraisingam 2/34 (4 overs) | | Elsa Hunter 10 (11); Shashini Gimhani 3/9 (4 overs) |

Sri Lanka won by 144 runs
Rangiri Dambulla International Stadium, Dambulla
Umpires: Saleema Imtiaz (Pak) and Shathira Jakir (Ban)
Player of the match: Chamari Athapaththu (SL)

- Sri Lanka won the toss and elected to bat.
- Nur Izzatul Syafiqa (Mas) made her T20I debut.
- Chamari Athapaththu (SL) became the first cricketer to hit a hundred in Women’s Twenty20 Asia Cup.
- This was the Sri Lanka's highest total in women's T20Is.

22 July 2024
19:00 (N)
Scorecard

| Thailand; 96/9 (20 overs) | v | Bangladesh; 100/3 (17.3 overs) |
| Nattaya Boochatham 40 (41); Rabeya Khan 4/14 (4 overs) | | Murshida Khatun 50 (55); Phannita Maya 1/8 (1.3 overs) |

Bangladesh won by 7 wickets
Rangiri Dambulla International Stadium, Dambulla
Umpires: Nur Hijrah (Mas) and Dedunu Silva (SL)
Player of the match: Rabeya Khan (Ban)

- Thailand won the toss and elected to bat.
- Sabikun Nahar (Ban) made her T20I debut.

24 July 2024
14:00
Scorecard

| Bangladesh; 191/2 (20 overs) | v | Malaysia; 77/8 (20 overs) |
| Murshida Khatun 80 (59); Elsa Hunter 1/27 (4 overs) | | Elsa Hunter 20 (23); Nahida Akter 2/13 (4 overs) |

Bangladesh won by 114 runs
Rangiri Dambulla International Stadium, Dambulla
Umpires: Dedunu Silva (SL) and Gayathri Venugopalan (Ind)
Player of the match: Murshida Khatun (Ban)

- Bangladesh won the toss and elected to bat.

24 July 2024
19:00 (N)
Scorecard

| Thailand; 93/7 (20 overs) | v | Sri Lanka; 94/0 (11.3 overs) |
| Nannapat Koncharoenkai 47* (53); Kavisha Dilhari 2/13 (4 overs) | | Chamari Athapaththu 49* (35) |

Sri Lanka won by 10 wickets
Rangiri Dambulla International Stadium, Dambulla
Umpires: Vrinda Rathi (Ind) and Hemangi Yerzal (UAE)
Player of the match: Chamari Athapaththu (SL)

- Thailand won the toss and elected to bat.

== Knockout stage ==
=== Bracket ===
Semi-finals
A1 | India | 83/0 (11)
B2 | Bangladesh | 80/8 (20)
B1 | Sri Lanka | 141/7 (19.5)
A2 | Pakistan | 140/4 (20)

Final
SF1 | India | 165/6 (20)
SF2 | Sri Lanka | 167/2 (18.4)

=== Semi-finals ===
==== 1st Semi-final ====
26 July 2024
14:00
Scorecard

| Bangladesh; 80/8 (20 overs) | v | India; 83/0 (11 overs) |
| Nigar Sultana 32 (51); Renuka Singh 3/10 (4 overs) | | Smriti Mandhana 55* (39) |

India won by 10 wickets
Rangiri Dambulla International Stadium, Dambulla
Umpires: Nimali Perera (SL) and Dedunu Silva (SL)
Player of the match: Renuka Singh Thakur (Ind)

- Bangladesh won the toss and elected to bat.
- Renuka Singh Thakur (Ind) took her 50th wicket in women's T20Is.

==== 2nd Semi-final ====
26 July 2024
19:00 (N)
Scorecard

| Pakistan; 140/4 (20 overs) | v | Sri Lanka; 141/7 (19.5 overs) |
| Muneeba Ali 37 (34); Udeshika Prabodhani 2/23 (4 overs) | | Chamari Athapaththu 63 (48); Sadia Iqbal 4/16 (4 overs) |

Sri Lanka won by 3 wickets
Rangiri Dambulla International Stadium, Dambulla
Umpires: Vrinda Rathi (Ind) and Gayathri Venugopalan (Ind)
Player of the match: Chamari Athapaththu (SL)

- Sri Lanka won the toss and elected to field.
- Udeshika Prabodhani (SL) played in her 100th T20I match.
- Nida Dar became the first Pakistani women's cricketer to take 250 wickets in international cricket.

=== Final ===
28 July 2024
15:00
Scorecard

| India; 165/6 (20 overs) | v | Sri Lanka; 167/2 (18.4 overs) |
| Smriti Mandhana 60 (47); Kavisha Dilhari 2/36 (4 overs) | | Harshitha Samarawickrama 69* (51); Deepti Sharma 1/30 (4 overs) |

Sri Lanka won by 8 wickets
Rangiri Dambulla International Stadium, Dambulla
Umpires: Saleema Imtiaz (Pak) and Shathira Jakir (Ban)
Player of the match: Harshitha Samarawickrama (SL)

- India won the toss and elected to bat.
- Jemimah Rodrigues (Ind) became the youngest women cricketer to play 100th T20I match, and scored 3,000th run in international cricket.
- Kavisha Dilhari (SL) took her 50th wicket in women's T20Is.

== Statistics ==
=== Most runs ===
| Player | Innings | NO | Runs | Average | SR | HS | 100 | 50 | 4s | 6s |
|---|---|---|---|---|---|---|---|---|---|---|
| (Sri Lanka) Chamari Athapaththu | 5 | 2 | 304 | 101.33 | 146.85 | 119* | 1 | 2 | 35 | 15 |
| (India) Shafali Verma | 5 | 1 | 200 | 50.00 | 140.84 | 81 | 0 | 1 | 27 | 3 |
| (India) Smriti Mandhana | 4 | 1 | 173 | 57.66 | 137.30 | 60 | 0 | 2 | 29 | 2 |
| (Pakistan) Gull Feroza | 4 | 1 | 149 | 49.66 | 125.21 | 62* | 0 | 2 | 22 | 0 |
| (Bangladesh) Nigar Sultana | 3 | 2 | 142 | 142.00 | 111.53 | 62* | 0 | 1 | 13 | 2 |
Updated: 28 July 2024

=== Most wickets ===
| Player | Innings | Wickets | Runs | Overs | BBI | Econ. | Ave. | 5WI |
|---|---|---|---|---|---|---|---|---|
| (India) Deepti Sharma | 5 | 10 | 100 | 20.0 | 3/13 | 5.00 | 10.00 | 0 |
| (Sri Lanka) Kavisha Dilhari | 5 | 9 | 111 | 18.0 | 2/4 | 6.16 | 12.33 | 0 |
| (Pakistan) Sadia Iqbal | 3 | 8 | 67 | 14.1 | 4/16 | 4.72 | 8.37 | 0 |
| (India) Renuka Singh Thakur | 5 | 7 | 92 | 19.0 | 3/10 | 4.84 | 13.14 | 0 |
| (India) Radha Yadav | 5 | 6 | 128 | 19.0 | 3/14 | 6.73 | 21.33 | 0 |
Updated: 28 July 2024
