= Chamari Athapaththu =

Sri Lankan cricketer (born 1990)

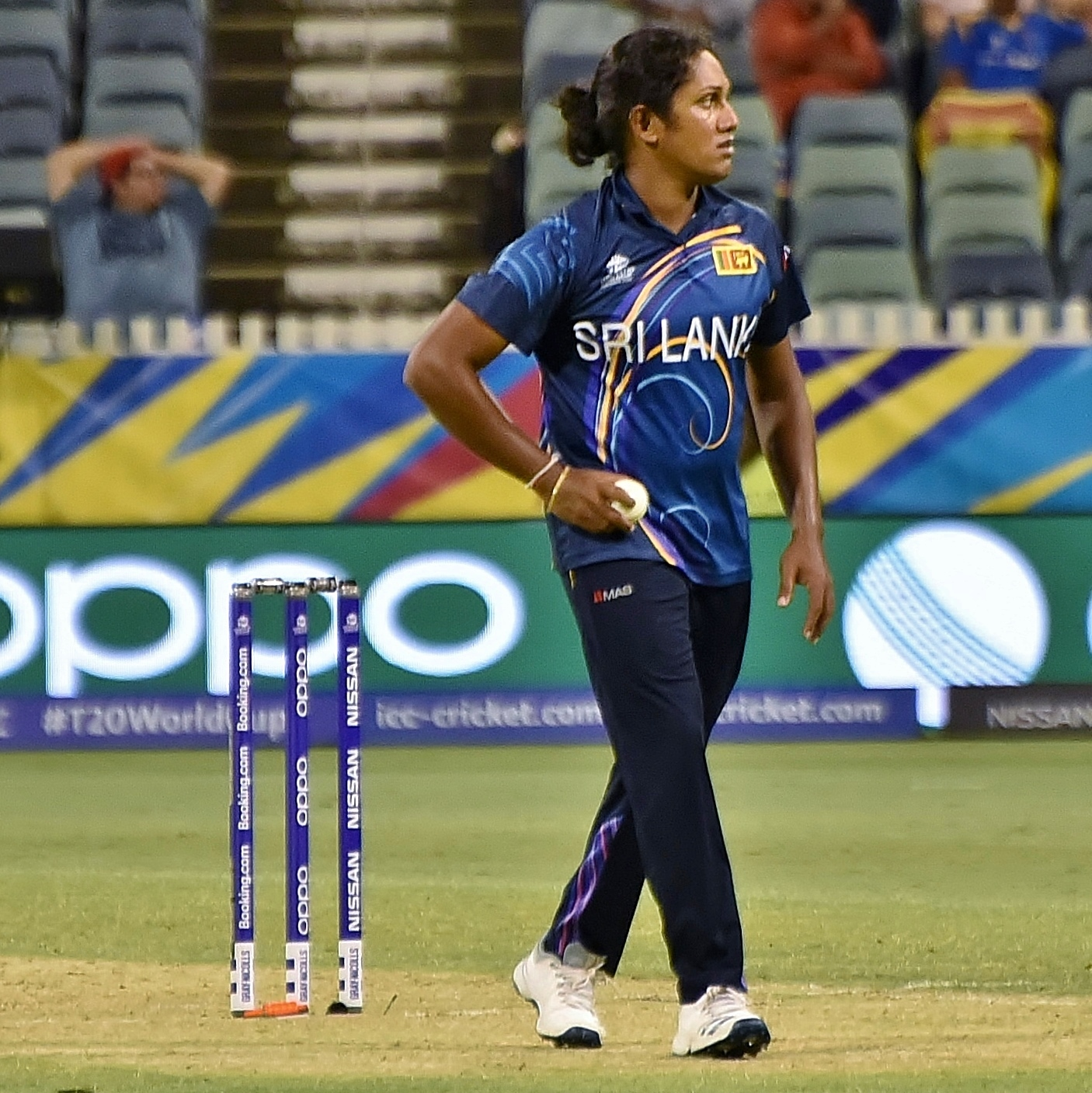
- Athapaththu walking back to her mark while bowling for Sri Lanka during 2020 ICC Women's T20 World Cup

Personal information
- Full name: Athapaththu Mudiyanselage Chamari Jayangani Kumari Athapaththu
- Born: 9 February 1990 (age 36); Kurunegala, Sri Lanka
- Height: 1.63 m (5 ft 4 in)
- Batting: Left-handed
- Bowling: Right-arm off break
- Role: Batting All-rounder

International information
- National side: Sri Lanka (2009-present)
- ODI debut (cap 44): 18 April 2010 v West Indies
- Last ODI: 27 April 2025 v India
- T20I debut (cap 12): 15 June 2009 v India
- Last T20I: 18 March 2025 v New Zealand
- T20I shirt no.: 58

Domestic team information
- Years: Team
- 2007: Colts Cricket Club
- 2009/10: Kurunegala Youth Cricket Club
- 2012/13–2016/17: Sri Lanka Air Force Sports Club
- 2017–2018: Yorkshire Diamonds
- 2017/18–2019/20, 2022/23: Melbourne Renegades
- 2018/19: Chilaw Marians Cricket Club
- 2019: Loughborough Lightning
- 2019–2020: Supernovas
- 2021/22: Perth Scorchers
- 2022: Guyana Amazon Warriors
- 2023/24–2025/26: Sydney Thunder
- 2023/24: Northern Districts
- 2024-present: UP Warriorz
- 2024: Oval Invincibles
- 2026/27–present: Hobart Hurricanes (squad no. 99)

Career statistics
Competition	WODI	WT20I
Matches	129	172
Runs scored	4,253	4,282
Batting average	34.57	27.10
100s/50s	9/20	4/16
Top score	195*	119*
Balls bowled	2,501	1,671
Wickets	61	92
Bowling average	37.44	22.88
5 wickets in innings	0	1
10 wickets in match	0	0
Best bowling	4/42	7/5
Catches/stumpings	32/–	47/–
Medal record
Representing Sri Lanka
Women's Cricket
Asia Cup
Winner	2024 Sri Lanka
Runner-up	2026 UAE
Asian Games
Silver medal – second place	2022 Hangzhou
Silver medal – second place	2026 Aichi–Nagoya	Team
Bronze medal – third place	2014 Incheon
- Source: ESPNcricinfo, 24 June 2026

Atapattu Mudiyanselage Chamari Jayangani Kumari Athapaththu (born 9 February 1990), known as Chamari Athapaththu, is a Sri Lankan cricketer and the captain of the national team. In 2017, she was named the Cricketer of the Year for the 2016–17 season at Sri Lanka Cricket's annual awards. She is the first Sri Lankan woman to play franchise cricket. In 2023, a special seating zone at the Sydney Cricket Ground was named after her as Chamari Bay.

== International career ==
She is known for aggressive batting in the top order. In the 2013 Women's Cricket World Cup, Atapattu hit 62 runs from 72 balls against England women, where the Sri Lanka women won the match by one wicket. Under her captaincy, Sri Lanka women won the T20I series against Pakistan Women.

She is also the only Sri Lankan woman cricketer to score an ODI century, doing this five times in her career. She scored her maiden ODI century on 28 April 2011 against Ireland. She holds the record for scoring the most number of ODI centuries and fifties for Sri Lanka in women's cricket history. She also holds the record for the highest WODI score for Sri Lanka, with 178 not out. She has the highest ODI average for Sri Lanka in women's cricket. She is also the only Sri Lankan woman cricketer to score an ODI hundred as well as having scored most runs in an innings at a strike rate of over 100. She was the third woman cricketer in the world to be dismissed for 99 in an ODI innings.

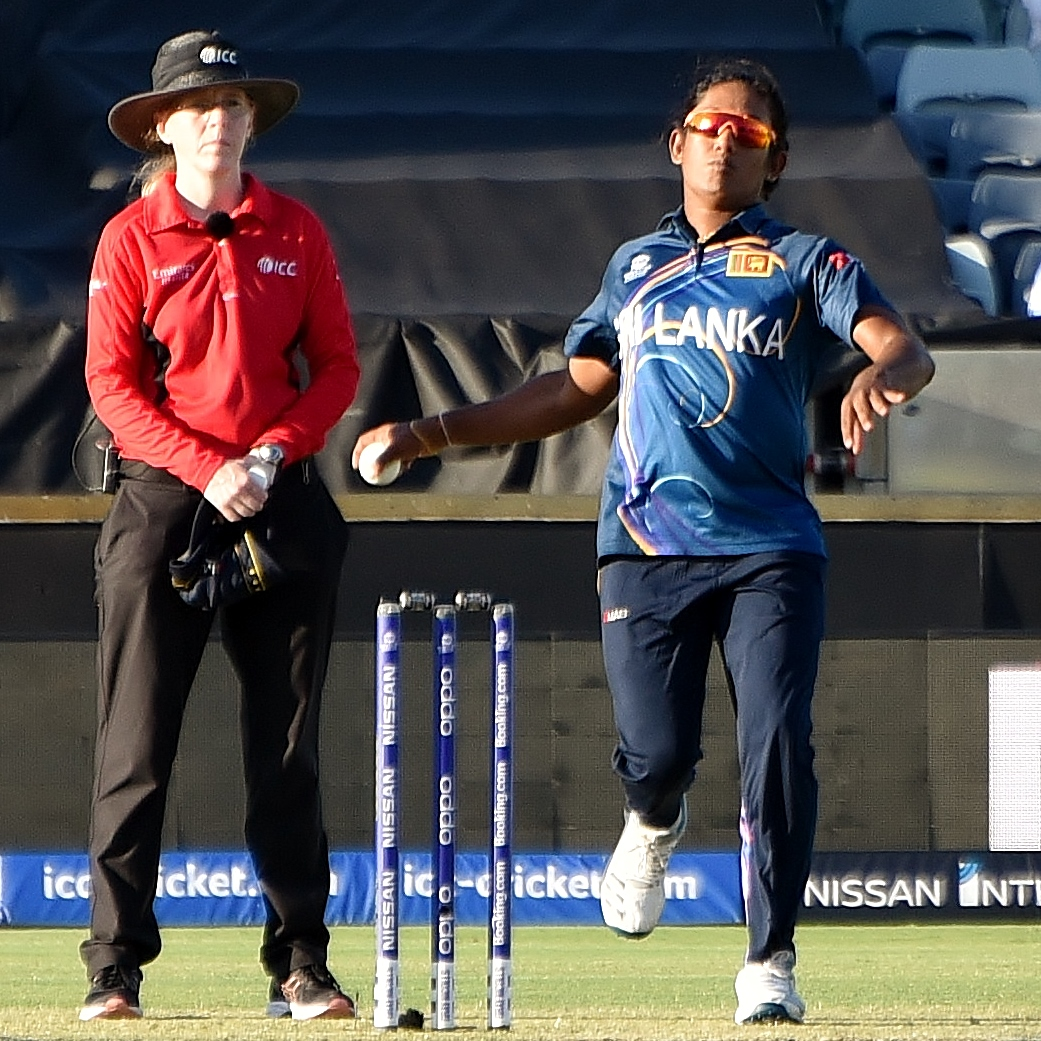
Atapattu bowling for Sri Lanka during the 2020 ICC Women's T20 World Cup

Atapattu's 178 not out is the highest Women's ODI score when batting at number three position for Sri Lanka. Chamari Atapattu is the first and only Sri Lankan woman cricketer to score a century in Women's Cricket World Cup history

Atapattu is the first Sri Lankan batswoman to pass 1,000 runs in T20Is and she is also the leading runscorer for Sri Lanka in both ODIs and T20Is.

At 2016 ICC Women's T20 World Cup she scored her maiden T20Is half century against South Africa. During that match, South African's had a successful 50 run partnership for the first wicket. But Atapattu came in charge break the partnership from runout and she bowled Mignon du Preez for a four-ball duck in the same over. Finally, Sri Lanka won the match by 10 runs. For the all round performance Atapattu won player of the match award. She was the leading run scorer for Sri Lanka with 141 runs in four matches.

At the 2017 Women's Cricket World Cup, during Sri Lanka's match against Australia, she scored the third-highest individual total in a WODI and the second-highest total in a Women's World Cup match, with 178 not out. She also scored the highest percentage of runs in a completed innings in a WODI (69.26%) and the most runs in boundaries in a WODI, with 124. It was also the record for scoring the highest individual score in an innings of a WODI in a losing cause. Even in a losing cause she won player of the match award for her performance.

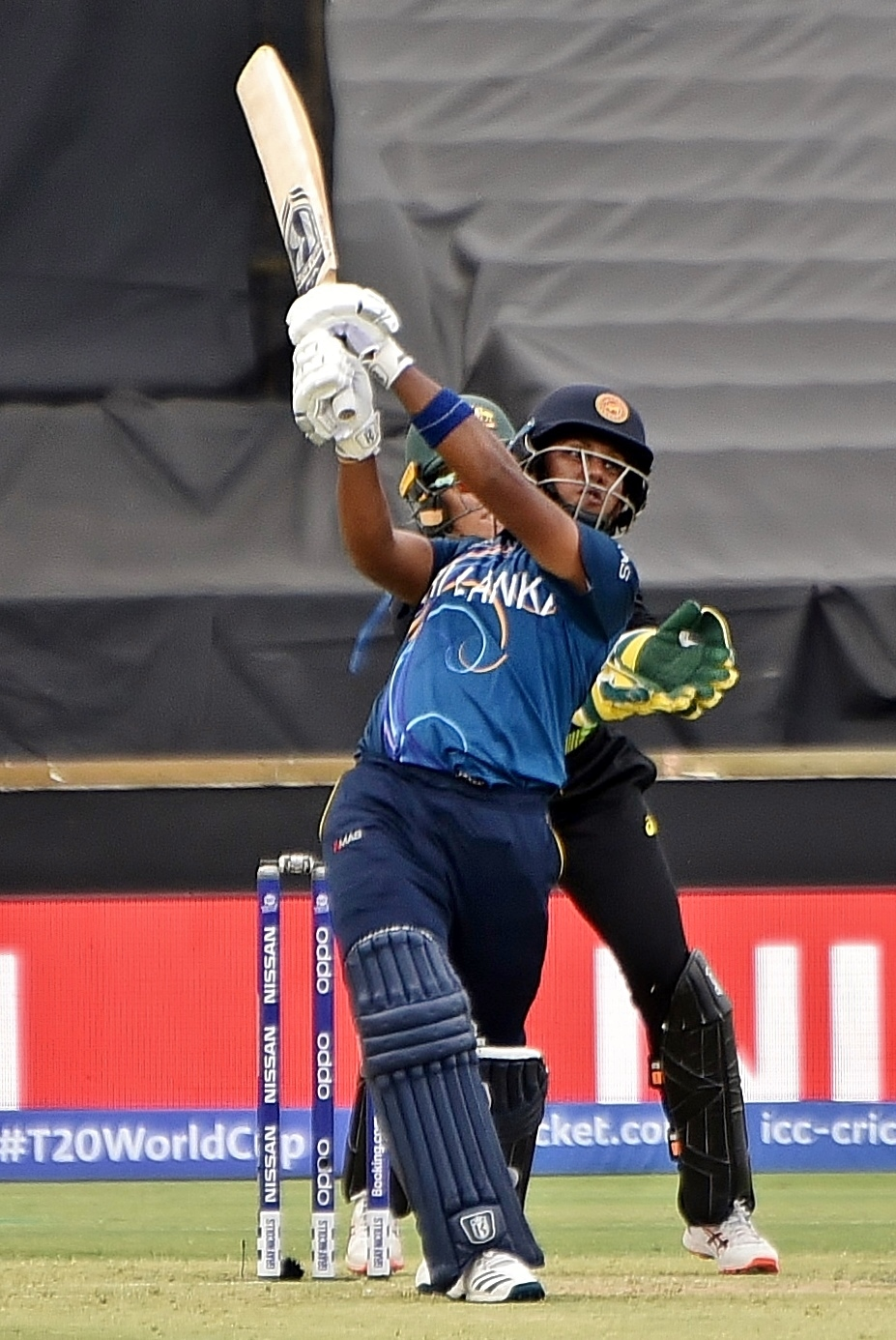
Scoring a half century against Australia during the 2020 ICC Women's T20 World Cup

In October 2018, she was named as captain of Sri Lanka's squad for the 2018 ICC Women's World Twenty20 tournament in the West Indies. Ahead of the tournament, she was named as one of the players to watch. She was the leading run-scorer for Sri Lanka in the tournament, with 59 runs in three matches.

On 9 October 2019 third ODI match against Australia Atapattu scored her fifth ODI century. On 29 September 2019, in the first WT20I match against Australia, Atapattu scored her first century in WT20I cricket. She scored 113 runs from 66 balls. Athapaththu went from 51 to 113 in merely 22 deliveries, as she hit 12 fours and six sixes at a strike rate of 171.21 during the innings against Australia but Sri Lanka lost the match.

In January 2020, she was named as the captain of Sri Lanka's squad for the 2020 ICC Women's T20 World Cup in Australia. During practice match against England Atapattu scored unbeaten 78 runs and took three wickets and Sri Lanka won the match. In the first WT20 match against New Zealand She scored 41 runs and took one wicket but Sri Lanka lost the match. Next match against Australia she scored her second T20I half century. She was the leading run-scorer for Sri Lanka in the tournament, with 154 runs in four matches including one half century.

In October 2021, she was named as the captain of Sri Lanka's team for the 2021 Women's Cricket World Cup Qualifier tournament in Zimbabwe. In January 2022, Atapattu was named as the captain of Sri Lanka's team for the 2022 Commonwealth Games Cricket Qualifier tournament in Malaysia. She performed consistently throughout Commonwealth Games Cricket Qualifier scoring 221 runs in four matches including two half centuries with average of 55.25 and strike rate of 185.71, and also taking four wickets. Due to her all round performance she won player of the series award. Sri Lanka won all four games and secure the place at Commonwealth games 2022. Following her performance at the Commonwealth Games Qualifier, she moved into the top 10 of the ICC Women's T20I batting rankings.

In June 2022, third ODI against Pakistan, Athapattu scored her sixth ODI century, her first against Pakistan. She scored 101 runs from 85 balls, hitting 13 boundaries and one six. She put 152 run partnership with Harshitha Madavi for 3rd wicket. While bowling she took two wickets and one run out. Finally Sri Lanka won the match by 93 runs. Athapattu won player of the match award for her performance. Later the same month, in Sri Lanka's home series against India, Athapattu became the first batter for Sri Lanka to score 2,000 runs in WT20I cricket.

In July 2022, she was named as the captain of Sri Lanka's team for the cricket tournament at the 2022 Commonwealth Games in Birmingham, England.

On 10 February 2023, opener of T20 World cup 2023, Athapattu scored her 6th T20I half century against South Africa. She scored 68 runs from 50 balls hitting 12 boundaries. Finally Sri Lanka won the match by 3 runs and Athapattu won player of the match award for her performance.

On 27 June 2023, first ODI match against New Zealand, Chamari scored her 7th ODI century, first century against New Zealand. She also reached 3000 ODI runs. She scored unbeaten 108 runs from 83 deliveries hitting ten boundaries and five sixes. While chasing down 170 runs, she put 159 run partnership for the first wicket with Vishmi Gunarathna. This was also the highest partnership for the first wicket for Sri Lanka women's cricket team. Finally, Sri Lanka won the match by 9 wickets. This was also Sri Lanka's first ODI victory against New Zealand. Due to her match winning knock, Chamari won the player of the match award.

On 3 July 2023, third ODI match against New Zealand, Chamari scored her 8th ODI century. In the process she moved up to joint-fourth on the list of most ODI hundreds in women's cricket. While chasing down the target she reached to century by 60 balls. Fastest century in her career. Finally she scored unbeaten 140 runs and also put unbeaten 190 run partnership with Nilakshi De Silva. This was their highest partnership for any wicket in Sri Lanka women team surpassing previous record held on first ODI match. Finally Sri Lanka won the match by 8 wickets and won the series. This was Sri Lanka's first bilateral ODI series victory. Due to her performance, Chamari won player of the match award and player of the series award. She was the highest run scorer in the series, scoring 248 runs in three matches including two centuries. Following her performance against New Zealand, Chamari became No 1 ODI batsman in women's ODI rankings, becoming first Sri Lankan to do so.

On 12 July 2023, 3rd T20I match against New Zealand, Chamari scored her 7th T20I half century. While chasing down the target of 140 runs, Chamari scored unbeaten 80 runs from 47 deliveries hitting 13 boundaries and two sixes. She also put an unbeaten partnership of 143 runs with Harshitha Madhawi. Finally Sri Lanka won the match by 10 wickets in just 14.3 overs and due to excellent batting performance, Chamari won player of the match award.

On 2 September 2023, 2nd T20I match against England, Chamari scored her 8th T20I half century. While chasing down the target of 105, she scored 55 runs from 31 balls hitting 8 boundaries and two sixes. While bowling she took one wicket. Finally Sri Lanka won the match by 8 wickets. This is first win for Sri Lanka against England in T20I format. Due to her all round performance Chamari won player of the match award. Chamari won the ICC Women's Player of the Month for September 2023 for her impressive eye-catching performances against England during the month.

Due to her impressive performance during the year of 2023, she was named as captain of ICC women's ODI team and T20I team of the year.

On 3 April 2024, third T20I match against South Africa, Chamari scored 9th T20I half century. She scored 73 runs from 46 deliveries hitting 7 boundaries and five sixes and she also put 97 run partnership with Harshitha Samarawickrama. Finally Sri Lanka won the match by 4 wickets and also won the series. This was Sri Lanka's maiden bilateral T20I series win against South Africa. Due to her performance, Chamari won player of the match award.

On 13 April 2024, second ODI match against South Africa, Chamari scored 16th ODI half century scoring 51 runs from 69 balls hitting nine boundaries.

On 17 April 2024, third ODI match against South Africa, Chamari Athapattu scored her 9th ODI century. She scored unbeaten 195 runs from 139 deliveries hitting 26 boundaries and five sixes while chasing down the target of 302. Chamari also put unbeaten 179 run partnership with Nilakshi De Silva, the second-highest stand for the fifth-wicket or lower in the women's game and rescued Sri Lanka from 126 for 4 in the 21st over and successfully chased down the target 302. This is Sri Lanka's highest successful chase in women's ODIs and the first team in women's ODIs to chase down a 300-plus runs target successfully.

Athapaththu's score against South Africa is now the highest while chasing in women's ODIs, bettering Meg Lanning's 152* against Sri Lanka in 2017. Only Glenn Maxwell (201* vs Afghanistan in 2023) has a higher score in an ODI chase.

Athapaththu's unbeaten 195 is the third-highest individual score in women's ODIs. Finally Sri Lanka won the match by 6 wickets and series levelled. Due to her performance Chamari won player of the match award.

Following her impressive performance she was raised to No: 1 spot in ICC ODI rankings second time in her carrier achieving her highest-ever rating of 773 on the ICC table.

On 27 April 2024, against Scotland Chamari scored her 10th T20I half century. She scored unbeaten 59 runs from 35 balls hitting ten boundaries and one six while chasing down target of 95. Finally Sri Lanka won the match by 10 wickets.

On 7 May 2024, against Scotland at final of T20 world cup qualifier, Chamari scored her second T20I century. She scored 102 runs from 63 balls hitting 13 boundaries and four sixes. Chamari became oldest woman to score century in women's T20I at 34 years and 88 days. Finally Sri Lanka won the match by 68 runs and Chamari won player of the match award. Chamari is highest run scorer in the qualifier scoring 226 runs in 6 matches with average of 45.20 including taking 7 wickets.Sri Lanka qualified to ICC Women's T20I world cup 2024.

On 28 June, third T20I match against West Indies Chamari became first Sri Lankan to score 3000 T20I runs.

On 22 July 2024 second match against Malaysia in Asia cup, Chamari scored third T20I century. She scored unbeaten 119 runs from 69 balls hitting 14 boundaries and seven sixes surpassing her previous highest score in T20I carrier also highest score for Sri Lanka. Finally Sri Lanka won the match by 144 runs and Chamari won player of the match award for her performance.

On July 26, 2024 semi final match against Pakistan, Chamari scored vital half century while chasing down target of 141 runs. She scored 63 runs from 48 balls hitting nine boundaries and one six. Sri Lanka won the match by 3 wickets and went to the finals of Asia Cup. Due to her performance, Chamari won player of the match award.

On July 28, 2024 final match against India, Chamari played crucial knock by scoring 61 runs from 43 deliveries hitting nine boundaries and two sixes while chasing down the target of 165. It was her 12th half century in her T20I carrier. She also put 87 run partnership with Harshitha Madhawi who also scored her 6th T20I half century, for second wicket. Finally, Sri Lanka won the match by 7 wickets and won the asia cup title first time ever. Due to her all round performance, Chamari won player of the series award. Chamari is the highest run scorer in the Asia cup tournament. She scored 304 runs in five matches including two half centuries and one century with the average of 101.33 and strike rate 146.85. She also took three wickets with average of 23.33.

She was named captain of the Sri Lanka squad for the 2024 ICC Women's T20 World Cup.

Athapaththu was among the four player shortlists for the Women’s Cricketer of the Year, Women’s ODI Cricketer of the Year and Women's T20I Cricketer of the Year in the 2024 ICC Awards.

On June 23, 2026, against Ireland, Athapaththu scored her 4th T20I century. While chasing 131 runs, she scored unbeaten 106 runs from 61 balls. This is also her first century in T20I world cup. During the match Athapaththu hit 100 sixes in her T20I carrier. Due to her impressive knock, Sri Lanka won the match by 9 wickets.

On September 2, 2026, during a group stage match of the Women's Twenty20 Asia Cup against Indonesia, Athapaththu recorded figures of 7 wickets for 5 runs in 3.3 overs, including a hat-trick. With this performance, she became the first player to take seven wickets in an Asia Cup match in both men's and women's cricket combined, the first Sri Lankan to take 7 wickets in Women's T20Is, and the first Sri Lankan to claim a hat-trick in Women's T20Is.

On September 18, 2026 Quarter-Final match against Malaysia during Asian Games Chamari scored 63 runs hitting 7 boundaries and three sixes. While bowling she took two wickets. Finally Sri Lanka won the match by 86 runs and qualified for semi finals.

September 20, 2026 Semi final match against Pakistan in Asian Games Chamari scored another half century. While chasing down 177 runs, Chamari scored unbeaten 83 runs from 50 balls. Chamari hit seven fours and six sixes during her chase. Her innings helped Sri Lanka equal their highest total in a successful chase. Finally Sri Lanka won the match by 8 wickets and qualified for finals.

== International centuries ==
=== Overview ===
As of July 2026, Athapaththu has scored nine ODI centuries, against six different teams, with a top score of 195 not out. Five of the nine ODI centuries had been scored in Sri Lanka, and the others in England, Australia, Pakistan, and South Africa, respectively. Additionally, she has scored four WT20I centuries, the only Sri Lankan woman to have done so.

Centuries against nations
Opponent	ODI	T20I	Total
Australia	2	1	3
Bangladesh	–	–	–
England	–	–	–
India	1	–	1
Ireland	1	1	2
Malaysia	–	1	1
New Zealand	2	–	2
Pakistan	1	–	1
Scotland	–	1	1
South Africa	2	–	2
West Indies	–	–	–
Total	9	4	13

=== Key ===
- * – Remained not out
- † – Player of the match
- ‡ – Captain of Sri Lanka in that match

=== One Day International centuries ===
Chamari Atapattu's One Day International centuries
No.	Runs	Match	Opponents	Pos.	Inn.	S/R	Ground	H/A/N	Result	Year	Ref
1	111	7	Ireland	3	1	100.90	P. Sara Oval, Colombo	Home	No Result	2011	
2	106 ‡	31	South Africa	1	1	70.19	SSC Cricket Ground, Colombo	Home	No Result	2014	
3	178* †	61	Australia	3	1	124.47	Bristol County Ground, Bristol	Neutral	Lost	2017	
4	115 ‡	75	India	2	2	86.46	FTZ Sports Complex, Katunayake	Home	Won	2018	
5	103	84	Australia	1	1	83.06	Allan Border Field, Brisbane	Away	Lost	2019	
6	101 † ‡	87	Pakistan	2	1	118.82	Southend Club Cricket Stadium, Karachi	Away	Won	2022	
7	108* † ‡	93	New Zealand	1	2	130.12	Galle International Stadium, Galle	Home	Won	2023	
8	140* † ‡	95	New Zealand	1	2	170.00	Galle International Stadium, Galle	Home	Won	2023	
9	195* † ‡	101	South Africa	2	2	140.28	JB Marks Oval, Potchefstroom	Away	Won	2024	

=== T20 International centuries ===
Chamari Atapattu's T20 International centuries
No.	Runs	Match	Against	Pos.	Inn.	S/R	Ground	H/A/N	Result	Year	Ref
1	113 ‡	79	Australia	1	2	171.21	North Sydney Oval, Sydney	Away	Lost	2019	
2	102 † ‡	131	Scotland	2	1	161.90	Sheikh Zayed Stadium, Abu Dhabi	Neutral	Won	2024	
3	119* † ‡	136	Malaysia	2	1	172.46	Rangiri Dambulla International Stadium, Dambulla	Home	Won	2024	
4	106* † ‡	161	Ireland	1	2	177.33	Bristol County Ground, Bristol	Neutral	Won	2026	

== Franchise cricket ==
Athapaththu playing for Perth Scorchers

Atapattu is the first Sri Lankan to play in the Women's BBL franchise. She was signed by Melbourne Renegades for the third edition of the WBBL. In her 16 matches for Melbourne Renegades she has scored 196 runs with a high score of 42 and best bowling figures of 2–6. Before WBBL, her an unbeaten 178 against Australia in Bristol, helped her to become the first Sri Lankan woman to sign a contract with a franchise-based T20 league. She represented Yorkshire Diamonds and Loughborough Lightning in the second edition of the Kia Super League in England in 2017. Atapattu's stand-out season was in 2017 for Yorkshire Diamonds, when she made 135 runs in five matches. She was signed by Perth Scorchers for the 2020–21 Women's Big Bash League season and was part of the side's campaign which eventually clinch the title, although she had to leave the tournament halfway due to national commitments.

In August 2022, she was signed as an overseas player for Guyana Amazon Warriors for the inaugural edition of the Women's Caribbean Premier League. She returned to Melbourne Renegades during the 2022–23 Women's Big Bash League season, as a replacement for Harmanpreet Kaur.

She was bought by Sydney Thunder as an overseas replacement player for the 2023–24 Women's Big Bash League season after being initially ignored during the WBBL player draft. Her inclusion paid rich dividends for the Sydney Thunder as she piled up 511 runs in across 13 innings at an average of 42.58 with a strike rate touching closer to 130, while also doing fine with the ball capturing nine wickets at 25.55 with an excellent economy rate of 6.79 and she was awarded the WBBL 09 player of the tournament for her all-round performance both with the bat and ball.

== Sporting honours ==
- 2023 – ICC Women's Player of the Month for September.
- 2023 – ICC ODI Player of the Year
- 2023 – Player of the Tournament for the Women's Big Bash League 2023–24.
- 2024 – ICC Women's Player of the Month for May.
- 2024 – ICC Women’s Player of the Month for July.

== See also ==
- List of centuries in women's One Day International cricket
- List of centuries in women's Twenty20 International cricket
