= Ishma Tanjim =

Bangladeshi cricketer (born 1997)

Personal information
- Born: 10 February 1997 (age 29)
- Batting: Right-handed
- Bowling: Right-arm Offbreak
- Role: All-rounder

International information
- National side: Bangladesh (2024–present)
- ODI debut (cap 39): 10 April 2025 v Thailand
- Last ODI: 13 April 2025 v Ireland
- T20I debut (cap 43): 20 July 2024 v Sri Lanka
- Last T20I: 22 July 2024 v Thailand

Domestic team information
- Years: Team
- 2012/13: Chittagong Division
- 2017/18: Mymensingh Division
- 2022: Sylhet Division
- 2022/23: Meghna

Career statistics
Competition	WT20I	WFC	WLA	WT20
Matches	4	2	17	16
Runs scored	24	147	157	188
Batting average	8.00	147.00	11.21	15.66
100s/50s	0/0	0/2	0/0	0/1
Top score	16	82	45	54*
Balls bowled	–	6	42	–
Wickets	–	0	0	–
Bowling average	–	–	–	–
5 wickets in innings	–	–	–	–
10 wickets in match	–	–	–	–
Best bowling	–	–	–	–
Catches/stumpings	0/–	2/–	0/–	0/–
- Source: ESPNcricinfo, 20 July 2024

Ishma Tanjim (born 10 February 1997) is a Bangladeshi cricketer who plays for the Bangladesh women's cricket team as an all-rounder.

== International career ==
In October 2019, Tanjim was selected for Bangladesh Emerging Team for the ACC Women's Emerging Teams Cup.

In July 2024, she earned her maiden call-up for national team for the 2024 Women's Twenty20 Asia Cup. She made her Twenty20 International (T20I) debut against Sri Lanka on 20 July 2024.

Tanjim was part of the Bangladesh squad for the 2025 Women's Cricket World Cup Qualifier in Pakistan in April 2025, where Bangladesh as runners-up qualified for the World Cup.
