= Sophie Devine =

New Zealand cricketer (born 1989)

Sophie Devine ONZM
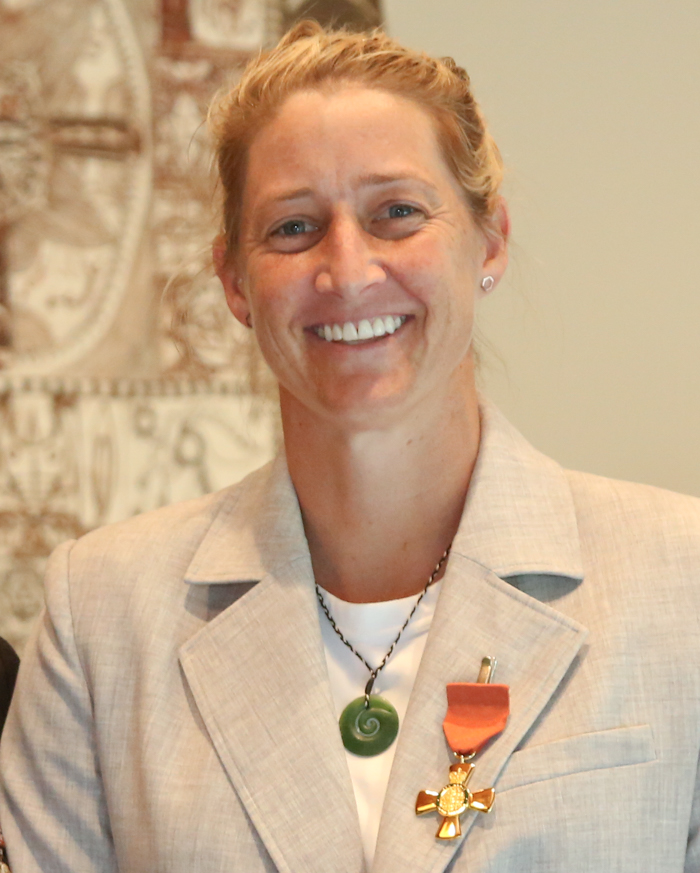
- Devine in 2026

Personal information
- Full name: Sophie Frances Monique Devine
- Born: 1 September 1989 (age 37); Porirua, New Zealand
- Batting: Right-handed
- Bowling: Right-arm medium
- Role: All-rounder

International information
- National side: New Zealand (2006–2026)
- ODI debut (cap 102): 22 October 2006 v Australia
- Last ODI: 26 October 2025 v England
- ODI shirt no.: 77
- T20I debut (cap 12): 18 October 2006 v Australia
- Last T20I: 27 June 2026 v England
- T20I shirt no.: 77

Domestic team information
- Years: Team
- 2003/04–2006/07: Wellington
- 2007/08: Canterbury
- 2008/09–present: Wellington
- 2014/15–2015/16: South Australia
- 2015/16–2019/20: Adelaide Strikers
- 2016: Loughborough Lightning
- 2017–2018: Warwickshire
- 2017: Yorkshire Diamonds
- 2017/18: South Australia
- 2018–2019: Supernovas
- 2018: Loughborough Lightning
- 2018/19–2019/20: Western Australia
- 2020/21–present: Perth Scorchers
- 2022–2024: Birmingham Phoenix
- 2023–2024: Royal Challengers Bengaluru
- 2023: Guyana Amazon Warriors
- 2026-present: Gujarat Giants (WPL)

Career statistics
Competition	WODI	WT20I
Matches	159	158
Runs scored	4,279	3,817
Batting average	32.66	28.69
100s/50s	9/18	1/24
Top score	145	105
Balls bowled	5,262	2,253
Wickets	111	130
Bowling average	36.27	19.54
5 wickets in innings	0	0
10 wickets in match	0	0
Best bowling	3/24	4/12
Catches/stumpings	44/–	49/–
Medal record
Representing New Zealand
Women's cricket
ICC T20 World Cup
Winner	2024 UAE
Runner-up	2009 England
Runner-up	2010 West Indies
Commonwealth Games
Bronze medal – third place	2022 Birmingham
- Source: ESPNcricinfo, 16 July 2026

Sophie Frances Monique Devine ONZM (born 1 September 1989) is a New Zealand sportswoman, who represented New Zealand in both cricket for the New Zealand national women's cricket team (White Ferns), and in field hockey as a member of the New Zealand women's national field hockey team (Black Sticks Women). She has since focused on cricket. She is known for not wearing a helmet when batting, a rarity in 21st century cricket. In December 2017, she was named as one of the players in the ICC Women's T20I Team of the Year.

In August 2018, she was awarded a central contract by New Zealand Cricket, following the tours of Ireland and England in the previous months. In October 2018, she was named in New Zealand's squad for the 2018 ICC Women's World Twenty20 tournament in the West Indies. Ahead of the tournament, she was named as the star of the team.

In July 2020, Devine was appointed as the captain of the New Zealand women's cricket team on a full-time basis, taking over from Amy Satterthwaite. In September 2021, in the second match against England, Devine played in her 100th WT20I.

== Early life ==
Devine was born in Kenepuru hospital, Porirua, New Zealand, and grew up in Tawa, a northern suburb of Wellington, New Zealand, where she attended Greenacres School and Tawa College. She began to play cricket and hockey at the age of four and wanted to become an All Black. At Tawa College, she played cricket mainly in the boys' teams including representative Wellington age group teams and the Tawa College boys first 11 and she played in the boys premier hockey team for the Tawa club. In her last year at Tawa College, she was awarded the bowling 'wicket' for the most wickets in the season. A previous winner was Black Caps Mark Gillespie. She started playing senior women's hockey at age 14 and made her first-class cricket debut as a 14-year-old. At the end of 2006, Devine shifted to Christchurch with her family when her father was relocated with his work. After attending Rangi Ruru Girls' School for her final high school year, she attended the University of Canterbury completing a Bachelor of Arts majoring in sociology.

== Career ==
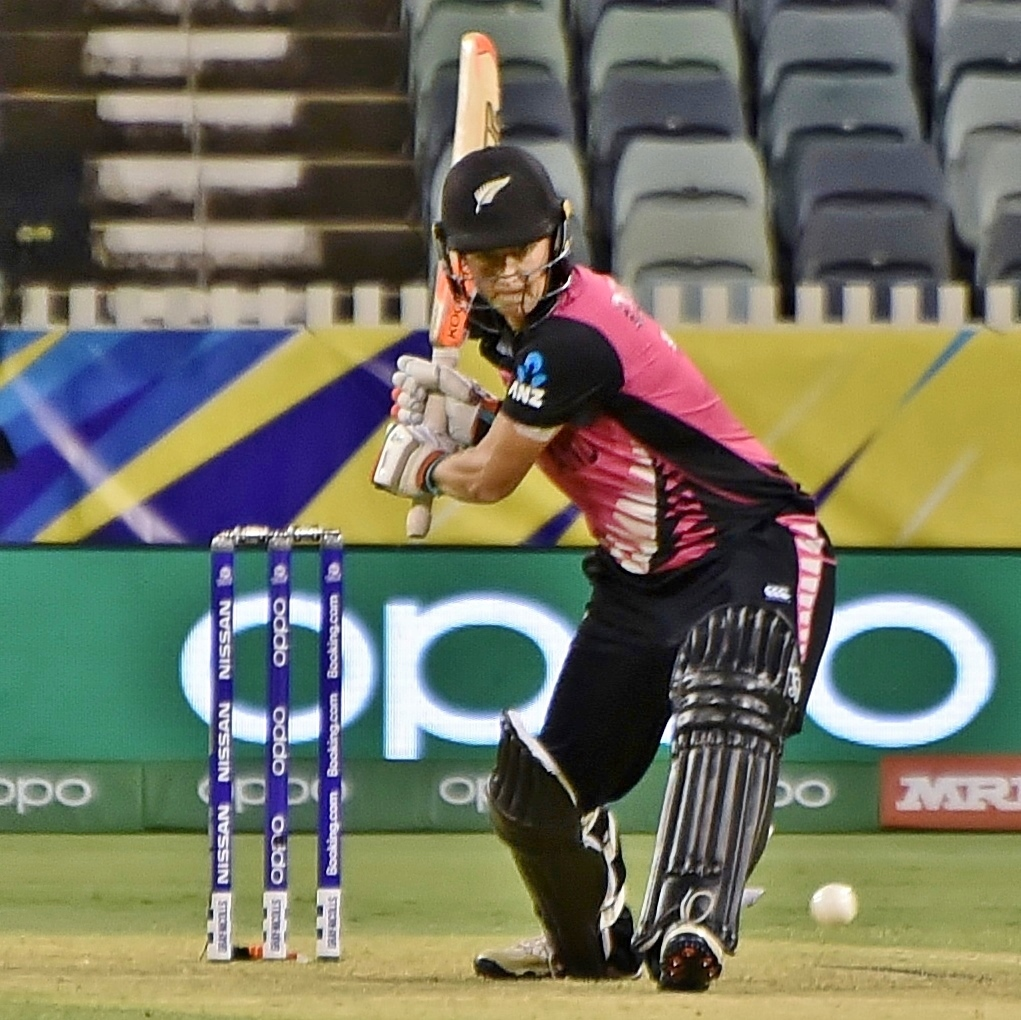
Devine batting for New Zealand during the 2020 ICC Women's T20 World Cup

Devine was selected for the New Zealand women's national cricket team, the White Ferns, at age 17 and became one of the youngest-ever members of the team. She was in a home economics class at Tawa College when the White Ferns coach, Steve Jenkin, gave her the news.

In November 2018, she was named in the Adelaide Strikers' squad for the 2018–19 Women's Big Bash League season. In March 2019, she was named as the ANZ International Women's T20 Player of the Year at the annual New Zealand Cricket awards. She also took over when captain Amy Satterthwaite went on maternity leave.

In January 2020, she was named as the captain of New Zealand's squad for the 2020 ICC Women's T20 World Cup in Australia. On 10 February 2020, in the fourth WT20I match against South Africa, Devine scored her first century in a WT20I match. In the same match, she became the first cricketer (male or female) to make five consecutive scores of fifty or more in T20Is. In New Zealand's first match of the Women's T20 World Cup, against Sri Lanka, Devine became the first cricketer, male or female, to make six consecutive scores of fifty or more in T20I cricket. She was the leading run-scorer for New Zealand in the tournament, with 132 runs in four matches.

In November 2020, Devine was nominated for the ICC Women's T20I Cricketer of the Decade award. In February 2022, she was named as the captain of New Zealand's team for the 2022 Women's Cricket World Cup in New Zealand.

In April 2022, she was picked by the Birmingham Phoenix for the 2022 season of The Hundred in England. In June 2022, Devine was named as the captain of New Zealand's team for the cricket tournament at the 2022 Commonwealth Games in Birmingham, England.

In the inaugural season of the Women's Premier League in 2023, Devine was bought by Royal Challengers Bangalore (RCB) at the price of 50 Lakhs. She was a member of the RCB side that won the 2024 Women's Premier League.

In September 2024 she was named as captain of the New Zealand squad for the 2024 ICC Women's T20 World Cup where they won the tournament. Devine's individual highlight at the event was scoring 57 not out in the group stage win over India.

Devine was named as captain of the New Zealand squad for their ODI tour to India in October 2024.

In the 2025 King's Birthday Honours, Devine was appointed an Officer of the New Zealand Order of Merit, for services to cricket.

She captained the New Zealand squad during the ICC women's world cup in October 2025, following which she retired from ODI cricket for New Zealand. She continued to play T20 cricket for New Zealand up until the 2026 Women's T20 World Cup, after which she retired from all international cricket.

== Records ==
On 11 July 2015, Devine broke the international record (women) for the fastest Twenty20 half century (from 18 balls), and fastest 70 runs (from 22 balls), and included scoring 32 off one over in the first match against India. She holds the record for scoring the fastest ever fifty in Women's Twenty20 International (WT20I) history (from 18 balls). During a match against Pakistan at the 2017 Women's Cricket World Cup, Devine became the first woman to hit nine sixes in Women's One-day International cricket. In 2020, she became the first player (male or female) to score fifties in 6 consecutive T20Is. In January 2021, she broke the women's T20 record for the fastest century, scoring 100 in 36 balls for Wellington Blaze against Otago Sparks in the 2020–21 Super Smash.

== International centuries ==
In February 2013, in a return to international cricket after an absence of two-and-a-half years, Devine scored her maiden international century, 145 runs from 131 balls, in New Zealand's opening match of the 2013 Women's Cricket World Cup against South Africa. She also combined with Suzie Bates in a 128-run partnership, and followed up with partnerships of 64 with Sara McGlashan and 102 with Nicola Browne. During the innings, Devine hit 13 fours and six sixes, although she later said, "I couldn’t find the middle of the bat. I felt really scratchy, like I was never in really good flow."

Some five years later, in the course of just 10 matches between October 2017 and July 2018, Devine made her next four ODI centuries, against four different opponents, in four different countries. She scored no further international centuries until 2020, when she made her maiden T20I ton, against South Africa at home. On that occasion, she shared in another big partnership – of 142 – with Bates, and in another victory for New Zealand. "I know I was a little bit lucky in that knock,” she said later. "I think I got dropped a couple of times, but you sort of ride that."

In March 2022, she made a further WODI century, against the West Indies during the 2022 Women's Cricket World Cup, also in New Zealand.

On 30 June 2023, she combined with Amelia Kerr in a 229-run partnership to lead New Zealand to a 116-run victory in the second of a three-ODI bilateral series against Sri Lanka in Sri Lanka. It was the third-highest partnership by New Zealand's women for any wicket in ODIs. Each player scored a century; Devine finished with 137 runs, including 17 fours and two sixes, from just 121 balls.

One Day International centuries
No.	Runs	Opponents	City/Country	Venue	Year
1	145	South Africa	Cuttack, India	DRIEMS Ground	2013
2	103	Pakistan	Sharjah, United Arab Emirates	Sharjah Cricket Stadium	2017
3	108	West Indies	Lincoln, New Zealand	Bert Sutcliffe Oval	2018
4	108	Ireland	Dublin, Ireland	The Vineyard	2018
5	117 *	England	Leicester, England	Grace Road	2018
6	108	West Indies	Mount Maunganui, New Zealand	Bay Oval	2022
7	137	Sri Lanka	Galle, Sri Lanka	Galle International Stadium	2023
8	112	Australia	Indore, India	Holkar Stadium	2025

T20 International centuries
No.	Runs	Opponents	City/Country	Venue	Year
1	105	South Africa	Wellington, New Zealand	Basin Reserve	2020

== See also ==
- List of centuries in women's One Day International cricket
- List of centuries in women's Twenty20 International cricket
