= Sachini Nisansala =

Sri Lankan cricketer

Personal information
- Full name: Sachini Nisansala Lakshitha
- Born: 11 November 2001 (age 25); Rathgama, Galle District, Southern Province, Sri Lanka
- Batting: Left-handed
- Bowling: Slow left-arm orthodox
- Role: Bowler

International information
- National side: Sri Lanka (2022–present)
- ODI debut (cap 73): 3 June 2022 v Pakistan
- Last ODI: 21 June 2024 v West Indies
- T20I debut (cap 50): 18 January 2022 v Scotland
- Last T20I: 28 May 2022 v Pakistan
- T20I shirt no.: 11

Domestic team information
- Years: Team
- 2016/17–present: Seenigama
- 2018/19: Dambulla District
- 2019/20–present: Kandy District

Career statistics
Competition	WODI	WT20I
Matches	3	5
Runs scored	2	–
Batting average	2.00	–
100s/50s	0/0	–
Top score	2*	–
Balls bowled	89	109
Wickets	5	3
Bowling average	15.80	30.00
5 wickets in innings	1	0
10 wickets in match	0	0
Best bowling	5/28	2/10
Catches/stumpings	1/–	1/–
Medal record
Representing Sri Lanka
Women's Cricket
South Asian Games
Silver medal – second place	2019 Kathmandu/Pokhara	Team
Women's Asia Cup
Winner	2024 Sri Lanka
- Source: ESPNcricinfo, 23 June 2024

Sachini Nisansala Lakshitha (born 11 November 2001) is a Sri Lankan cricketer. She plays as a slow left-arm orthodox bowler and a left-handed batter.

== Career ==
In October 2021, she was named in Sri Lanka's squad ahead of the 2021 Women's Cricket World Cup Qualifier but was yet to play a match before the tournament abruptly ended due to the COVID-19 pandemic. She made her Women's Twenty20 International debut at the age of 20, in the 2022 Commonwealth Games Cricket Qualifier against Scotland on 18 January 2022. She took two wickets and enacted a run-out in that match. The captain Chamari Athapaththu won the Player of the Match award for her 86-run inning, however she handed it to the debutant Nisansala. Nisansala took one further wicket in her remaining three matches of that tournament.

She plays domestic cricket for Seenigama Women and Kandy District Women. She was the fourth highest wicket taker in the 2021–22 Sri Lanka Women's Division One Tournament, with 16 wickets at an average of 10.44. In May 2022, she was named in the ODI and T20I squads for the series against Pakistan. She made her Women's One Day International debut in the second match of the series on 3 June 2022. She was named in the Sri Lanka squad for the 2024 ICC Women's T20 World Cup.
