= Rangiri Dambulla International Stadium =

Cricket stadium in Sri Lanka

- Dambulla Stadium
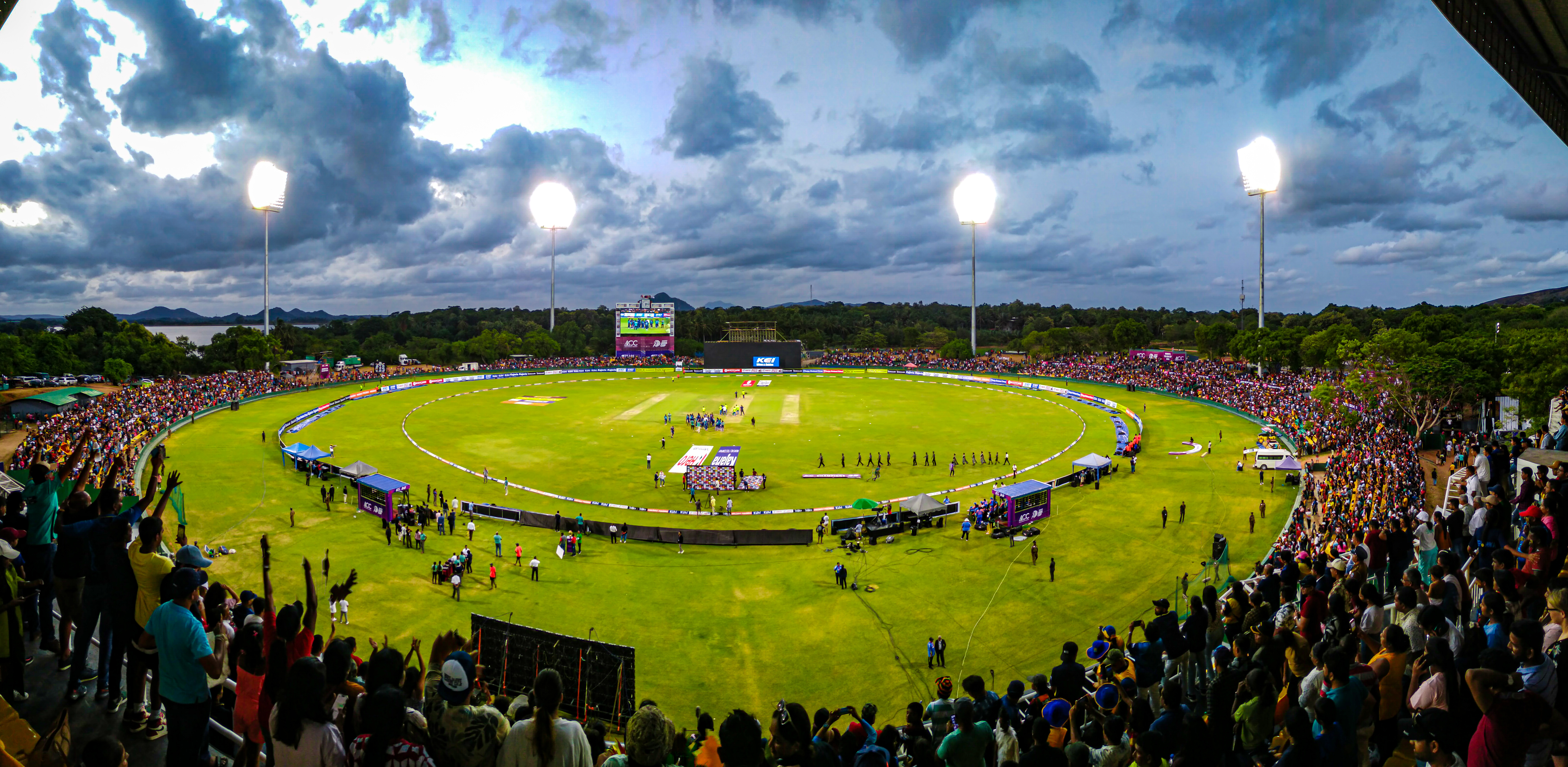
- During the 2024 Women's Twenty20 Asia Cup final between Sri Lanka and India
- Interactive map of Rangiri Dambulla International Stadium

Ground information
- Location: Dambulla, Central Province
- Country: Sri Lanka
- Coordinates: 7°51′34″N 80°38′02″E
- Establishment: 2000
- Capacity: 16,800 (Expandable to 30,000)
- Owner: Golden Temple of Dambulla
- Operator: Sri Lanka Cricket
- Tenants: Sri Lanka national cricket team; Sri Lanka women's national cricket team; Sri Lanka national under-19 cricket team; Sri Lanka women's national under-19 cricket team; Dambulla Sixers
- End names
- Press Box End; Scoreboard End

International information
- First men's ODI: 23 March 2001: Sri Lanka v England
- Last men's ODI: 13 October 2018: Sri Lanka v England
- First men's T20I: 17 February 2024: Sri Lanka v Afghanistan
- Last men's T20I: 9 January 2026: Sri Lanka v Pakistan
- First women's ODI: 2 May 2008: Sri Lanka v Pakistan
- Last women's ODI: 24 March 2018: Sri Lanka v Pakistan
- First women's T20I: 23 June 2022: Sri Lanka v India
- Last women's T20I: 28 July 2024: Sri Lanka v India
- As of 17 October 2024; Source: Cricinfo; CricketArchive

Rangiri Dambulla International Cricket Stadium (Sinhala: රංගිරි දඹුලු ජාත්‍යන්තර ක්‍රීඩාංගනය, Tamil: தம்புள்ள சர்வதேச கிரிக்கெட் விளையாட்டு மைதானம்) is a 16,800-seat cricket stadium in Sri Lanka. It is situated in the Central Province, close to Dambulla on a 60-acre (240,000 m^{2}) site leased from the Rangiri Dambulla Temple. It is the first and only International cricket ground in the dry zone of Sri Lanka. The stadium is built overlooking the Dambulla Tank (reservoir) and the Dambulla Rock.

== History ==
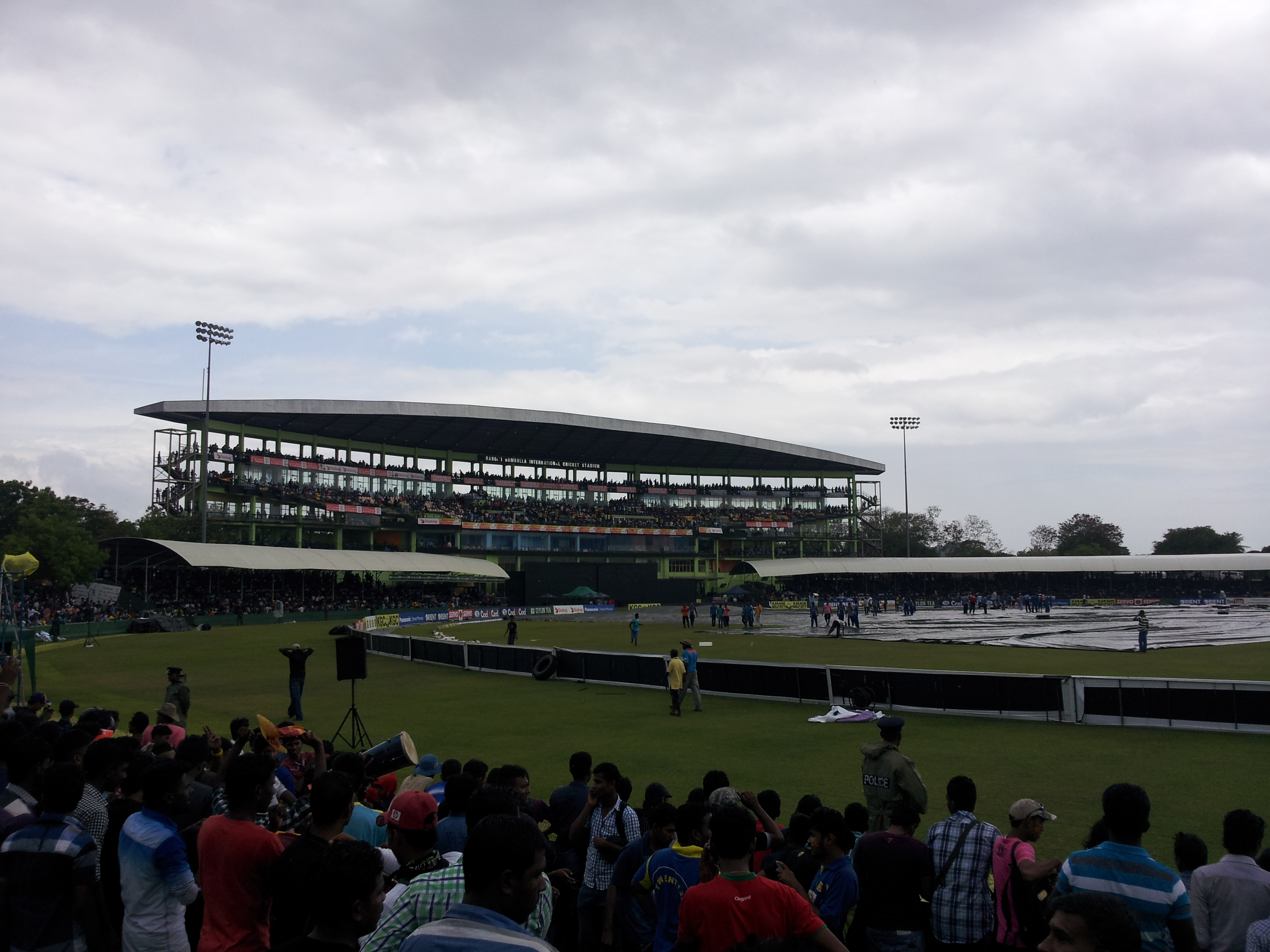
During Pakistan vs Sri Lanka ODI

- The inaugural One Day International (ODI) match was played between Sri Lanka and England in March 2001.
- Floodlights were installed in 2003.
- This stadium hosted all the matches of the Asia Cup 2010, due to renovation of other grounds for the 2011 Cricket World Cup.
- The stadium returned to international cricket in November 2013 after a three-year period due to its highly criticised floodlight system.
- The stadium hosted only day matches from 2013 until late 2016.
- In 2015, plans were undertaken to replace the outdated 8 floodlight towers with four LED ones.
- On 5 February 2024, under the ‘Centre of Excellence’, President Ranil Wickremesinghe opened a facility with a hydrotherapy unit and a state-of-the-art medical centre and also inaugurated the modern LED lighting system of the ground.

== The ground ==
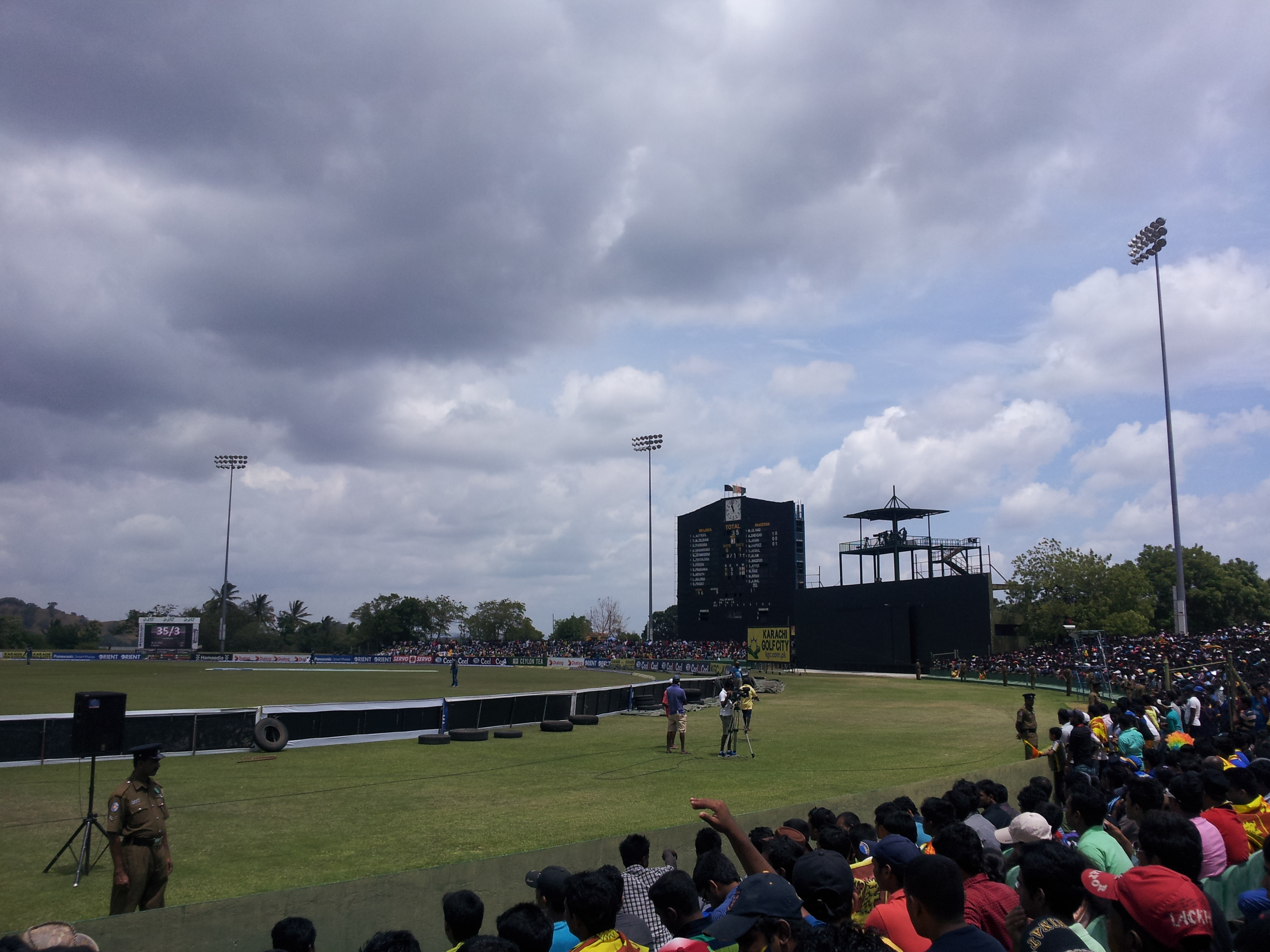
Scoreboard end

Situated in the dry zone, the original rationale behind the project was that it provided Sri Lanka with the potential to host one-day matches throughout the year. Construction was funded by the Board of Control for Cricket in Sri Lanka (BCCSL) and championed by the then BCCSL President, Thilanga Sumathipala. Construction took only 167 days. After construction and the inaugural match it sat idle due to complications with the lease and the contractors. International cricket finally returned in May 2003, the venue staging all seven matches of the tournament because of monsoon rains in the south.

The pitch is bowler friendly. Seamers benefit in the morning because of the high water table and heavy sweating. Spinners benefit in the afternoon when the pitch can crumble.

The first day-night ODI was held on 28 August 2016, during the ODI series against Australia after upgrading floodlights to ICC Standards. This match was the final ODI for Sri Lankan great Tillakaratne Dilshan.

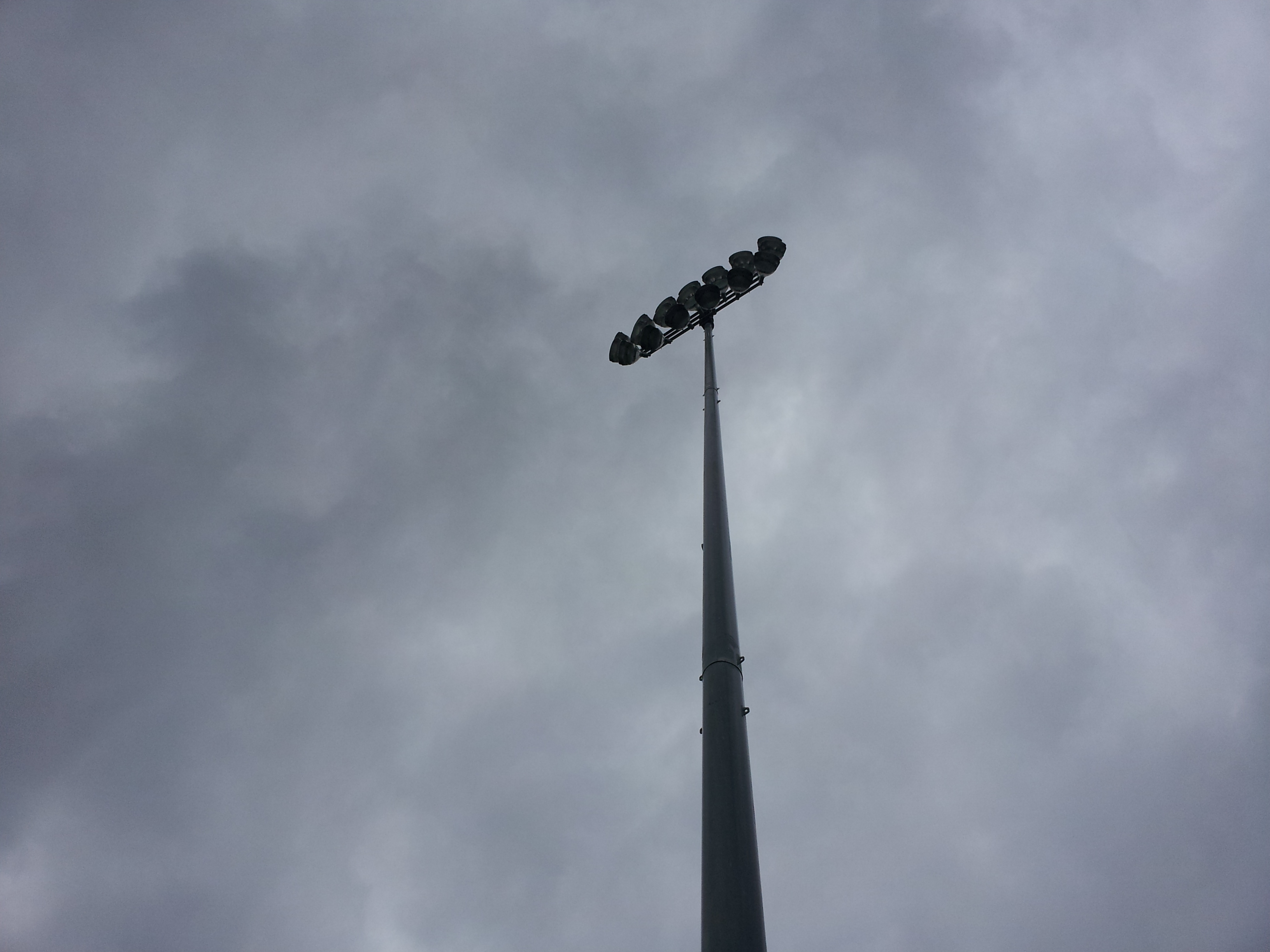
Despite hosting over 30 day/night matches, the floodlights were not considered fit for ICC Standards, until upgrading in 2016.

== Ground figures ==
=== Key ===
- Played: Matches played
- Bat: Matches won by batting first
- Bowl: Matches won by bowling first

Ground figures
| Format | Played | Bat | Bowl | Inaugural match |
| One-Day Internationals | 69 | 32 | 34 | 23 March 2001 |
| Twenty20 Internationals | 24 | 10 | 14 | 23 June 2022 |

Updated 1 November 2024

=== One Day International ===
- The highest ODI total at the Rangiri Dambulla International Stadium is 385/7 by Pakistan against Bangladesh on June 21, 2010.
- The lowest ODI total is 88 by England against Sri Lanka on November 18, 2003, and by India against New Zealand on August 10, 2010.
- Mahela Jayawardene has scored 1148 runs and is the highest by a single player at the Rangiri Dambulla International Stadium.
- The highest individual score at stadium is 132 not out by Shikhar Dhawan against Sri Lanka in 2017.
- India legend Sourav Ganguly scored his 10000th ODI run on this ground in 2005.
- Muttiah Muralitharan with 42 scalps has captured the most number of wickets at the Rangiri Dambulla International Stadium.
- The best bowling figures recorded at the stadium is 6/42 by John Hastings.
- Farveez Maharoof (Sri Lanka) and Taskin Ahmed (Bangladesh) have both taken hat-tricks at the Rangiri Dambulla International Stadium.
- The 50th ODI at the ground was held on 28 March 2017, between Sri Lanka and Bangladesh, which was washed out by the rain and ended in no result. The match was also the 200th ODI for Sri Lankan opener Upul Tharanga as well.
- On 20 August 2017, Lasith Malinga played his 200th ODI match for Sri Lanka against India.

== See also ==
- List of One Day International cricket grounds
- List of Twenty20 International cricket grounds
- List of international cricket grounds in Sri Lanka
