= Vishmi Gunaratne =

Sri Lankan cricketer (born 2005)

Personal information
- Full name: Rajapaksha Mudiyanselage Vishmi Dewmini Gunarathne
- Born: 22 August 2005 (age 21)
- Batting: Right-handed
- Role: Batter

International information
- National side: Sri Lanka
- ODI debut (cap 75): 4 July 2022 v India
- Last ODI: 7 July 2022 v India
- T20I debut (cap 49): 18 January 2022 v Scotland
- Last T20I: 26 June 2024 v West Indies
- T20I shirt no.: 62

Domestic team information
- Years: Team
- 2021/22–present: Chilaw Marians Cricket Club

Career statistics
Competition	WODI	WT20I
Matches	2	9
Runs scored	6	104
Batting average	3.00	13.00
100s/50s	0/0	0/0
Top score	3	45
Catches/stumpings	0/–	1/–
Medal record
Women's cricket
Representing Sri Lanka
Asia Cup
Winner	2024 Sri Lanka
Runner-up	2026 UAE
Asian Games
Silver medal – second place	2022 Hangzhou
- Source: CricketArchive, 12 February 2023

Rajapaksha Mudiyanselage Vishmi Dewmini Gunarathne (born 22 August 2005, known as Vishmi Gunaratne) is a Sri Lankan cricketer who currently plays for Chilaw Marians Cricket Club and Sri Lanka. She plays as a right-handed batter.

== Domestic career ==
In 2022, playing for her school Rathnavali Balika Vidyalaya, Gunaratne scored the first ever quadruple century in Sri Lanka Girls' cricket, scoring 417 off 128 balls against Jayasiripura KV.

Gunaratne played for Chilaw Marians Cricket Club during the 2021–22 Sri Lanka Women's Division One Tournament, and scored 138* in her side's match against Sri Lanka Army Sports Club Second XI.

== International career ==
In October 2021, Gunaratne was selected in Sri Lanka's squad for the 2021 Women's Cricket World Cup Qualifier, but did not play a match.

Gunaratne made her Twenty20 International debut on 18 January 2022, at the 2022 Commonwealth Games Cricket Qualifier against Scotland, opening the batting and scoring 8 runs. She missed Sri Lanka's tour of Pakistan in order to sit exams.

During Sri Lanka's series against India in June and July 2022, she made her WT20I high score, scoring 45 as part of Sri Lanka's record opening partnership in WT20Is (87, made with Chamari Athapaththu). In the same series, she made her One Day International debut against India, on 4 July 2022. Gunaratne was selected as part of Sri Lanka's squad for the 2022 Commonwealth Games, playing two matches in the tournament.

In January 2023, Gunaratne was named in Sri Lanka's squad for the 2023 ICC Under-19 Women's T20 World Cup, as captain of the side. She was Sri Lanka's leading run-scorer in the tournament, with 134 runs at an average of 44.66. In February 2023, she played four matches for Sri Lanka at the 2023 ICC Women's T20 World Cup, scoring 60 runs. She was named in the Sri Lanka squad for the 2024 ICC Women's T20 World Cup.

== International centuries ==
=== Key ===
- * – Remained not out
- ‡ – Captain of Sri Lanka in that match
- † – Player of the match

One Day International centuries
No.	Runs	Match	Against	Pos.	Inn.	S/R	Venue	H/A/N	Year	Result	Ref
1	101	16	Ireland	1	1	103.06	Stormont Cricket Ground, Belfast	Away	16 August 2024	Lost	
2	123 †	36	Pakistan	1	2	100.00	Mahinda Rajapaksa International Cricket Stadium, Hambantota	Home	25 July 2026	Won	
