= Imesha Dulani =

Sri Lankan cricketer (born 2002)

Personal information
- Full name: Imesha Dulani Witharana
- Born: 20 January 2002 (age 24)
- Batting: Right-handed
- Role: Batter

International information
- National side: Sri Lanka
- ODI debut (cap 76): 29 April 2023 v Bangladesh
- Last ODI: 14 September 2023 v England
- ODI shirt no.: 9
- T20I debut (cap 54): 12 July 2023 v New Zealand
- Last T20I: 26 June 2024 v West Indies
Medal record
Women's cricket
Representing Sri Lanka
Asia Cup
Runner-up	2026 UAE
Asian Games
Silver medal – second place	2022 Hangzhou
Silver medal – second place	2026 Aichi–Nagoya	Team
- Source: Cricinfo, 12 July 2023

Imesha Dulani (born 20 January 2002) is a Sri Lankan cricketer who plays for the Sri Lanka women's national team.

== Recognition ==
In October 2021, she was one of three uncapped players named in Sri Lanka's team for the 2021 Women's Cricket World Cup Qualifier tournament in Zimbabwe. On 23 November 2021, she played in Sri Lanka's first match of the tournament, against the Netherlands. In January 2022, she was named as one of four reserve players in Sri Lanka's team for the 2022 Commonwealth Games Cricket Qualifier tournament in Malaysia. In May 2022, she was named in Sri Lanka's squad for their tour to Pakistan. In April 2023, she was named in Sri Lanka's squad for their Bangladesh women's cricket team in Sri Lanka in 2023 and made her ODI debut in the first match of the same series. She made her T20I debut, in the third match of the series against New Zealand, on 12 July 2023.
