= Dedunu de Silva =

Sri Lankan cricketer (born 1978)

Dedunu Silva
Personal information
- Full name: Lidamulage Dedunu Vindya Vijayanthi de Silva
- Born: 12 February 1978 (age 48); Colombo, Sri Lanka
- Batting: Right-handed
- Bowling: Right-arm medium
- Role: Batter, Umpire

International information
- National side: Sri Lanka
- ODI debut (cap 21): 1 December 2000 v Australia
- Last ODI: 20 April 2010 v West Indies
- T20I debut (cap 16): 21 April 2010 v West Indies
- Last T20I: 10 May 2010 v India

Domestic team information
- Years: Team
- 2000–2007: Slimline Sports Club
- 2008–2011: Marians
- 2012–2015: Sri Lanka Navy Sports Club
- 2016/17: Colts Cricket Club

Umpiring information
- WODIs umpired: 10 (2023–2025)
- WT20Is umpired: 34 (2022–2025)

Career statistics
Competition	WODI	WT20I
Matches	42	6
Runs scored	884	95
Batting average	21.04	15.83
100s/50s	0/6	0/0
Top score	78	36
Catches/stumpings	8/–	4/–
- Source: Cricinfo, 15 June 2023

Dedunu Silva (born 12 February 1978) is a Sri Lankan former cricketer and current international umpire. In January 2023, she was named as one of the on-field umpires for the 2023 ICC Under-19 Women's T20 World Cup.
