= Sri Lanka Women's Division One Tournament =

Sri Lankan women's cricket competition

- Countries: Sri Lanka
- Administrator: Sri Lanka Cricket
- Format: Limited overs cricket (50 overs per side)
- First edition: 2007
- Latest edition: 2021–22
- Tournament format: League
- Number of teams: 8
- Current champion: Sri Lanka Navy Sports Club (7th title)
- Most successful: Sri Lanka Navy Sports Club (7 titles)
- Website: Sri Lanka Cricket

The Sri Lanka Women's Division One Tournament, previously known as the Sri Lanka Women's Cricket Limited Overs Tournament, is a women's domestic one-day cricket competition organised by Sri Lanka Cricket. The competition currently sees eight teams competing in 50-over matches, and has existed since the 2007 season.

The most successful side in the history of the competition, and the current holders as winners of the 2021–22 season, are Sri Lanka Navy Sports Club.

== History ==
The tournament, first named the Sri Lanka Women's Cricket Limited Overs Tournament, began in 2007, following the All Island Women's Cricket Association Challenge Trophy (1999–00 to 2001) and the Singer Challenge Trophy (2002 to 2004). The first tournament saw eight teams competing in a round-robin group, with Slimline Sports Club going unbeaten to win the tournament, beating Colombo Cricket Club in the final. The following season saw the same two teams reach the final, but the title was shared after the match ended in a no result.

Ahead of the 2010 season, a second division of the competition was added, expanding the number of teams to 18. The second division took place again in 2011 and 2014–15, whilst the format of the competition changed in 2016, from one initial group followed by semi-finals and a final to two initial groups. Sri Lanka Navy Sports Club won four titles in a row (including one shared) during this period, between 2012–13 and 2015.

Ahead of the 2016–17 season, the tournament was renamed the Sri Lanka Women's Division One Tournament. That season, Sri Lanka Air Force Sports Club beat Sri Lanka Army Sports Club in the final to claim their third title (second outright). The following season, 2018–19, the title was shared between Sri Lanka Army Sports Club and Sri Lanka Navy Sports Club after the final was abandoned, whilst Sri Lanka Navy Sports Club won the most recent edition of the competition in 2020–21, going unbeaten to top the group stage. Navy Sports Club retained their title the following season, 2021–22, topping the table by just one point over Air Force Sports Club.

== Teams ==
Team	First	Last	Titles
Chilaw Marians Cricket Club	2018–19	2021–22	0
Colombo Cricket Club	2007	2011	1
Colts Cricket Club	2007	2021–22	1
Colts Cricket Club 2nd XI	2010	2014	0
Gothami Sports Club	2011	2011	0
Kalutara Town Club	2011	2011	0
Kandy	2014	2014	0
Kandy Youth Cricket Club	2010	2010	0
Kandyan Cricket Club	2007	2007	0
Kurunegala Youth Cricket Club	2009–10	2014	0
Leofield Cricket Club	2011	2011	0
Marians	2008–09	2010	1
Maroons Sports Club	2010	2014	0
Matale Cricket Club	2010	2014	0
Matara Sports Club	2014	2016	0
Moratuwa Sports Club	2007	2009–10	0
Narammala Sports Club	2010	2011	0
Nittambuwa	2007	2014	0
Palink Sports Club	2007	2015	0
Pushpadana	2007	2010	0
Rithra Cricket Club	2011	2011	0
Seeduwa Raddoluwa Cricket Club	2011	2011	0
Seenigama	2010	2021–22	0
Shakthi	2010	2014	0
Slimline Sports Club	2007	2008–09	2
Southern Cricket Club	2009–10	2014	0
Sri Lanka Air Force Sports Club	2010	2021–22	3
Sri Lanka Air Force Sports Club 2nd XI	2014	2021–22	0
Sri Lanka Army Sports Club	2011	2021–22	2
Sri Lanka Army Sports Club 2nd XI	2014	2021–22	0
Sri Lanka Navy Sports Club	2011	2021–22	7
Sri Lanka Navy Sports Club 2nd XI	2016	2016	0
Sri Lanka Young	2008–09	2012–13	0
Wellawaya Super XI	2010	2010	0

Note: The Slimline Sports Club, Colombo Cricket Club, Sri Lanka Air Force Sports Club and Sri Lanka Army Sports Club totals include one shared title. The Sri Lanka Navy Sports Club total includes two shared titles.

== Results ==
Season	Winners	Runners-up	Ref
2007	Slimline Sports Club	Colombo Cricket Club	
2008–09	Title shared between Slimline Sports Club and Colombo Cricket Club		
2009–10	Marians	Kurunegala Youth Cricket Club	
2010	Colts Cricket Club	Marians	
2011	Sri Lanka Air Force Sports Club	Unknown	
2012–13	Sri Lanka Navy Sports Club	Sri Lanka Air Force Sports Club	
2013	Title shared between Sri Lanka Navy Sports Club and Sri Lanka Air Force Sports Club		
2014	Sri Lanka Navy Sports Club	Sri Lanka Air Force Sports Club	
2015	Sri Lanka Navy Sports Club	Sri Lanka Air Force Sports Club	
2016	Sri Lanka Army Sports Club	Sri Lanka Army Sports Club 2nd XI	
2016–17	Sri Lanka Air Force Sports Club	Sri Lanka Army Sports Club	
2018–19	Title shared between Sri Lanka Navy Sports Club and Sri Lanka Army Sports Club		
2020–21	Sri Lanka Navy Sports Club	Sri Lanka Air Force Sports Club	
2021–22	Sri Lanka Navy Sports Club	Sri Lanka Air Force Sports Club	

== See also ==
- Premier Limited Overs Tournament
