= Hasini Perera =

Sri Lankan cricketer (born 1995)

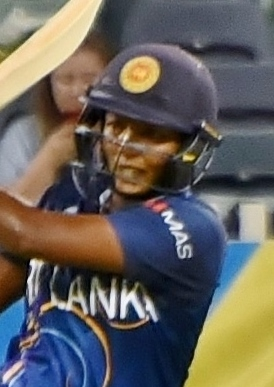
- Perera batting for Sri Lanka during the 2020 ICC Women's T20 World Cup

Personal information
- Full name: Gamachchi Withanage Hasini Madushika Perera
- Born: 27 June 1995 (age 31); Colombo, Sri Lanka
- Batting: Left-handed
- Bowling: Right arm medium-fast

International information
- National side: Sri Lanka
- ODI debut (cap 60): 15 October 2014 v South Africa
- Last ODI: 7 July 2022 v India
- ODI shirt no.: 72
- T20I debut (cap 35): 1 April 2014 v Bangladesh
- Last T20I: 6 September 2023 v England
- T20I shirt no.: 72

Career statistics
Competition	WODI	WT20I
Matches	38	45
Runs scored	538	440
Batting average	14.54	11.89
100s/50s	0/0	0/0
Top score	46	46*
Catches/stumpings	8/–	7/–
Medal record
Women's cricket
Representing Sri Lanka
Asia Cup
Winner	2024 Sri Lanka
Runner-up	2026 UAE
Asian Games
Silver medal – second place	2022 Hangzhou
Silver medal – second place	2026 Aichi–Nagoya	Team
- Source: Cricinfo, 2 October 2022

Hasini Perera (born 27 June 1995) is a Sri Lankan cricketer.

She made her T20I debut against Bangladesh in April 2014 and her ODI debut against South Africa in October the same year. Perera was a member of Sri Lanka's squad for the 2018 ICC Women's World Twenty20 tournament in the West Indies. In January 2020, she was named in Sri Lanka's squad for the 2020 ICC Women's T20 World Cup in Australia. In October 2021, she was named in Sri Lanka's team for the 2021 Women's Cricket World Cup Qualifier tournament in Zimbabwe. In January 2022, she was named in Sri Lanka's team for the 2022 Commonwealth Games Cricket Qualifier tournament in Malaysia. Perera was part of Sri Lanka's team for the cricket tournament at the 2022 Commonwealth Games in Birmingham, England, and for the 2024 ICC Women's T20 World Cup.
