= Kawya Kavindi =

Sri Lankan cricketer

Personal information
- Born: 30 October 2002 (age 24)
- Batting: Right-handed
- Bowling: Right-arm medium fast

International information
- National side: Sri Lanka
- ODI debut (cap 77): 29 April 2023 v Bangladesh
- Last ODI: 30 June 2023 v New Zealand
- T20I debut (cap 53): 9 May 2023 v Bangladesh
- Last T20I: 31 August 2023 v England
Medal record
Women's cricket
Representing Sri Lanka
Asia Cup
| Winner | 2024 Sri Lanka |
| Runner-up | 2026 UAE |
Asian Games
| Silver medal – second place | 2026 Aichi–Nagoya | Team |
- Source: Cricinfo, 10 October 2023

Kawya Kavindi (born 30 October 2002) is a Sri Lankan cricketer who plays for the Sri Lanka women's national team. She bats right handed and bowls right-arm medium fast.

== Recognition ==
In October 2021, Kavindi was named in Sri Lanka's team for the 2021 Women's Cricket World Cup Qualifier tournament in Zimbabwe, one of three uncapped players in Sri Lanka's squad. In January 2022, she was named as one of four reserve players in Sri Lanka's team for the 2022 Commonwealth Games Cricket Qualifier tournament in Malaysia as a standby player. In May 2022, her name was included as one of the reserve players in Sri Lanka's squad for their tour to Pakistan. In April 2023, she was named in Sri Lanka's squad for their Bangladesh women's cricket team in Sri Lanka in 2023 and made her ODI debut in the first match of the series, on 29 April 2023.
