= Harshitha Samarawickrama =

Sri Lankan cricketer

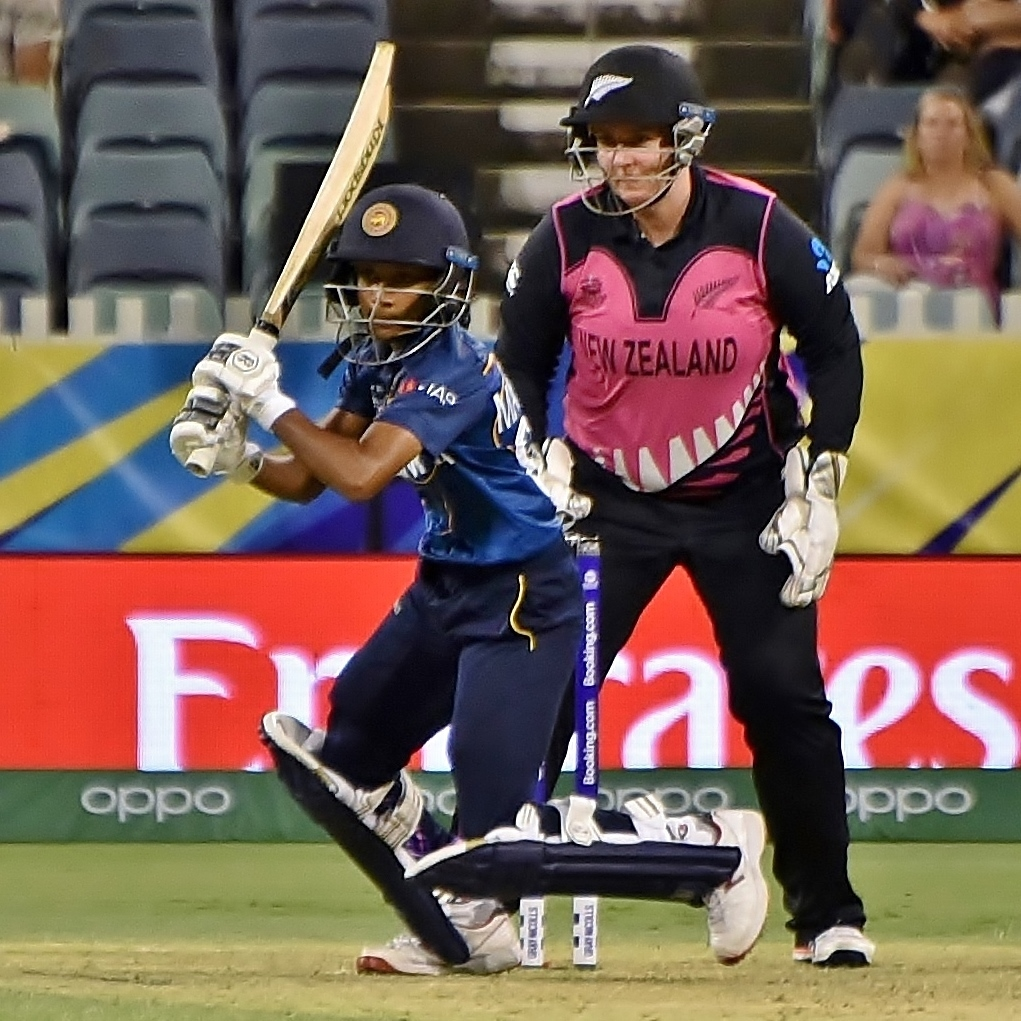
- Madavi batting for Sri Lanka during the 2020 ICC Women's T20 World Cup

Personal information
- Full name: Harshitha Madavi Dissanayake Samarawickrama
- Born: 29 June 1998 (age 28); Colombo, Sri Lanka
- Batting: Left-handed
- Bowling: Right arm slow-medium

International information
- National side: Sri Lanka
- ODI debut (cap 68): 20 September 2016 v Australia
- Last ODI: 25 April 2026 v Bangladesh
- ODI shirt no.: 88
- T20I debut (cap 42): 20 March 2016 v Ireland
- Last T20I: 26 June 2026 v Scotland
- T20I shirt no.: 88

Career statistics
Competition	WODI	WT20I
Matches	56	92
Runs scored	1,620	1,837
Batting average	35.21	27.01
100s/50s	2/9	0/9
Top score	105	86*
Balls bowled	24	–
Wickets	0	–
Bowling average	–	–
5 wickets in innings	–	–
10 wickets in match	–	–
Best bowling	–	–
Catches/stumpings	22/–	12/–
Medal record
Representing Sri Lanka
Women's cricket
Asia Cup
Winner	2024 Sri Lanka
Runner-up	2026 UAE
Asian Games
Silver medal – second place	2022 Hangzhou
Silver medal – second place	2026 Aichi–Nagoya	Team
South Asian Games
Silver medal – second place	2019 Kathmandu
- Source: Cricinfo, 31 August 2026

Harshitha Samarawickrama (Sinhala: හර්ෂිතා සමරවික්‍රම, [ɦarʃita: samərəʋikrəmə]; born 29 June 1998) is a Sri Lankan cricketer who plays for Sri Lanka's national women's team.

== International career ==
She made her Twenty20 International (T20I) debut against Ireland in March 2016 and her One Day International (ODI) debut against Australia in September 2016.

In November 2019, she was named the captain of Sri Lanka's squad for the women's cricket tournament at the 2019 South Asian Games. The Sri Lankan team won the silver medal, after losing to Bangladesh by two runs in the final. In January 2020, she was named as the vice-captain of Sri Lanka's squad for the 2020 ICC Women's T20 World Cup in Australia.

In October 2021, she was named as the vice-captain of Sri Lanka's team for the 2021 Women's Cricket World Cup Qualifier tournament in Zimbabwe. In January 2022, she was named as the vice-captain of Sri Lanka's team for the 2022 Commonwealth Games Cricket Qualifier tournament in Malaysia. In July 2022, she was named in Sri Lanka's team for the cricket tournament at the 2022 Commonwealth Games in Birmingham, England.

On July 28, 2024, in the final of the Women's Asia Cup against India, Harshitha's 69* off 51 balls led Sri Lanka to their first-ever Women's Asia Cup victory and earned her the Player of the Match award.

On 11 August 11, 2024, in the first T20I match against Ireland, Harshitha scored her 7th T20I half-century. She scored an unbeaten 86 runs from 45 balls, hitting 15 boundaries and one six. Sri Lanka won the match by 7 wickets and Harshitha won the Player of the Match award for her performance. On 13 August 13, 2024, in the second T20I match against Ireland, Harshitha scored her 8th T20I half-century. She scored 65 runs from 44 balls hitting nine boundaries and three sixes. Despite her efforts, Sri Lanka lost the match.

She was named in the Sri Lanka squad for the 2024 ICC Women's T20 World Cup & 2026 ICC Women's T20 World Cup.

== International centuries ==
=== Key ===
- * – Remained not out
- ‡ – Captain of Sri Lanka in that match
- † – Player of the match

One Day International centuries
No.	Runs	Match	Against	Pos.	Inn.	S/R	Venue	H/A/N	Year	Result	Ref
1	105	32	Ireland	3	2	84.67	Stormont Cricket Ground, Belfast	Away	18 August 2024	Lost	
2	100*	55	Pakistan	3	2	84.03	Mahinda Rajapaksa International Cricket Stadium, Hambantota	Home	25 July 2026	Won	
