= Inoshi Priyadharshani =

Sri Lankan cricketer (born 1987)

Personal information
- Full name: Sirikkattuduwage Inoshi Priyadharshani Fernando
- Born: 23 March 1987 (age 39); Colombo, Sri Lanka
- Batting: Right-handed
- Bowling: Right arm off spin

International information
- National side: Sri Lanka
- ODI debut (cap 66): 18 September 2016 v Australia
- Last ODI: 21 March 2019 v England
- T20I debut (cap 36): 23 October 2014 v South Africa
- Last T20I: 6 September 2023 v England
- T20I shirt no.: 52
Medal record
Representing Sri Lanka
Women's Cricket
Asian Games
Silver medal – second place	2022 Hangzhou	Team
Bronze medal – third place	2014 Incheon	Team
Women's Asia Cup
Winner	2024 Sri Lanka
- Source: Cricinfo, 2 October 2019

Inoshi Priyadharshani (born 23 March 1987) is a Sri Lankan cricketer who plays for the national women's cricket team. A right-handed batter and right-arm off-spin bowler, Priyadharshani made her One Day International (ODI) debut against Australia on 18 September 2016.

She was part of Sri Lanka's squad for the 2018 ICC Women's World Twenty20 tournament in the West Indies, as well as for the 2024 ICC Women's T20 World Cup.
