= Sri Lanka women's national cricket team =

Sri Lanka
- Association: Sri Lanka Cricket

Personnel
- Captain: Chamari Athapaththu
- Coach: Jamie Siddons

International Cricket Council
- ICC status: Full member (1981); Associate member (1965)
- ICC region: Asia
| ICC Rankings | Current | Best-ever |
| ODI | 6th | 5th (21 Jun 2024) |
| T20I | 6th | 6th (1 August 2026) |

Tests
- Only Test: Pakistan at Colts Cricket Club Ground, Colombo; 17–20 April 1998
| Tests | Played | Won/Lost |
| Total | 1 | 1/0 (0 draws) |

One Day Internationals
- First ODI: Netherlands at Sinhalese Sports Club Cricket Ground, Colombo; 25 November 1997
- Last ODI: Pakistan at Mahinda Rajapaksa International Cricket Stadium, Hambantota; 28 July 2026
| ODIs | Played | Won/Lost |
| Total | 213 | 74/128 (0 ties, 11 no results) |
| This year | 9 | 6/3 (0 ties, 0 no results) |
- World Cup appearances: 6 (first in 1997)
- Best result: 5th (2013)

T20 Internationals
- First T20I: Pakistan at County Ground, Taunton; 12 June 2009
- Last T20I: Netherlands at Karwan Cricket Ground, Ajman; 22 November 2026
| T20Is | Played | Won/Lost |
| Total | 196 | 81/109 (0 ties, 6 no results) |
| This year | 28 | 22/5 (0 ties, 1 no result) |
- T20 World Cup appearances: 8 (first in 2009)
- Best result: 1st round (2009, 2010, 2012, 2014, 2016, 2018, 2020, 2023)
ODI & T20I kit
- As of 22 November 2026

The Sri Lanka women's national cricket team represents Sri Lanka in international women's cricket. One of ten teams competing in the ICC Women's Championship (the highest level of the sport), the team is organised by Sri Lanka Cricket (SLC), a full member of the International Cricket Council (ICC).

The Sri Lanka women's team made their One Day International (ODI) debut in 1997, against the Netherlands, and later in the year participated in the 1997 World Cup in India. The team has since participated in every edition of the World Cup, with a fifth-place finish at the 2013 event being its best performance. At the Women's Twenty20 World Cup, Sri Lanka has likewise played at every tournament, although the team has never progressed past the first round. Sri Lanka played their first and only Test match to date in April 1998, defeating Pakistan.

== History ==
=== 1990s ===
Sri Lanka's international debut came in 1997 with a three-match ODI series against The Netherlands, which they lost 2–1. This was part of their preparation for the World Cup in India the following month, in which they reached the quarter finals, losing to England. The following year they hosted a tour by Pakistan, winning the three ODIs as well as what was the first Test match for both countries. It remains Sri Lanka's sole Test match. The Netherlands toured Sri Lanka again in 1999, and this time the Sri Lankans were much more successful, winning all five ODIs.

=== 2000s ===
Sri Lanka finished sixth in the 2000 World Cup, and their next international engagement was against Pakistan at home in 2002, winning all six ODIs. They also won all six ODIs in an away series against the West Indies the following year.

In 2004 they hosted the inaugural Women's Asia Cup, which was reduced to a series against India after the withdrawal of Pakistan. They lost the series. The following year they again finished sixth in the World Cup. In 2005/06, they visited Pakistan to take part in the second Asia Cup, finishing as runners up to India.

=== 2010s ===
In 2014, allegations of sexual abuse by Sri Lanka officials surfaced in the media. Some players were apparently compelled to perform sexual favours for the officials to earn or keep their place in the national team.

On 2013 Women's Cricket World Cup, Sri Lanka beat England in a pool match, which was a major upset in Women's ODI history. England are world's top ranked team and Sri Lanka is in underdog status, but this win gave a full of attention in World Cricket. Sri Lanka women next beat India women and finally they finished as fifth in the rankings.

On 8 August 2018, after a five-year gap since his previous spell in charge, Harsha de Silva was reappointed as the head coach of the team by the SLC.

=== 2020s ===
In 2021, Sri Lanka qualified for the 2022-25 ICC Women's Championship after the abandonment of the 2021 Women's Cricket World Cup Qualifier, due to the COVID-19 pandemic, resulted in qualifications for the 2022 Women's Cricket World Cup and the next cycle of the Women's Championship being decided via WODI rankings.

In 2023, Sri Lanka secured their first-ever series victory against England in England. Sri Lanka’s historic 2-1 victory was the first time England lost a bilateral T20I series to a team other than Australia since a 2-1 defeat to New Zealand in 2010.

Playing in front of their home supporters at Rangiri Dambulla International Stadium in Dambulla, Sri Lanka won the 2024 Women's Twenty20 Asia Cup, the first time they had taken the title, defeating India in the final by eight wickets after chasing a target of 166 with eight balls to spare.

== Tournament history ==
A red box around the year indicates tournaments played within Sri Lanka

Key
| Champions |
| Runners-up |
| Semi-finals |

=== ODI World Cup ===
World Cup record
| Year | Round | Position | Played | Won | Lost | Tie | NR |
|---|---|---|---|---|---|---|---|
| (England) 1973 | Did not participate | | | | | | |
| (India) 1978 | Did not participate | | | | | | |
| (New Zealand) 1982 | Did not participate | | | | | | |
| (Australia) 1988 | Did not participate | | | | | | |
| (England) 1993 | Did not participate | | | | | | |
| (India) 1997 | Quarter finals | 8/11 | 5 | 1 | 3 | 0 | 1 |
| (New Zealand) 2000 | Group Stage | 6/8 | 7 | 2 | 5 | 0 | 0 |
| (South Africa) 2005 | Group Stage | 6/8 | 7 | 1 | 4 | 0 | 2 |
| (Australia) 2009 | Group Stage | 7/8 | 3 | 0 | 3 | 0 | 0 |
| (India) 2013 | Super Six | 5/8 | 8 | 3 | 5 | 0 | 0 |
| (England) 2017 | Group Stage | 7/8 | 7 | 1 | 6 | 0 | 0 |
| (New Zealand) 2022 | Did not qualify | | | | | | |
| (India) 2025 | Group Stage | 5/8 | 7 | 1 | 3 | | 3 |
| Total | 0 Title | - | 44 | 9 | 29 | 0 | 6 |

=== T20 World Cup ===
T20 World Cup record
| Year | Round | Position | Played | Won | Lost | Tie | NR |
|---|---|---|---|---|---|---|---|
| (England) 2009 | Group Stage | 6/8 | 3 | 1 | 2 | 0 | 0 |
| (Cricket West Indies) 2010 | Group Stage | 6/8 | 3 | 1 | 2 | 0 | 0 |
| (Sri Lanka) 2012 | Group Stage | 5/8 | 3 | 1 | 2 | 0 | 0 |
| (Bangladesh) 2014 | Group Stage | 7/10 | 4 | 1 | 3 | 0 | 0 |
| (India) 2016 | Group Stage | 5/10 | 4 | 2 | 2 | 0 | 0 |
| (United Arab Emirates) 2018 | Group Stage | 6/10 | 4 | 1 | 2 | 0 | 1 |
| (Australia) 2020 | Group Stage | 8/10 | 4 | 1 | 3 | 0 | 0 |
| (South Africa) 2023 | Group Stage | 7/10 | 4 | 2 | 2 | 0 | 0 |
| (United Arab Emirates) 2024 | Group Stage | 9/10 | 4 | 0 | 4 | 0 | 0 |
| (England) 2026 | Group Stage | 6/12 | 5 | 3 | 2 | 0 | 0 |
| Total | 0 Title | - | 38 | 13 | 24 | 0 | 1 |

=== Women's Championship ===
Women's Championship record
| Year | Round | Position | Played | Won | Lost | Drawn | Tied | No result |
|---|---|---|---|---|---|---|---|---|
| 2014-16 | Group Stage | 8/8 | 21 | 2 | 18 | 0 | 0 | 1 |
| 2017-20 | Group Stage | 8/8 | 21 | 1 | 17 | 0 | 0 | 3 |
| 2022-25 | Group Stage | 5/10 | 24 | 9 | 11 | 1 | 0 | 4 |
| Total | 0 Title | - | 66 | 12 | 46 | 0 | 0 | 8 |

=== Women's Champions Trophy ===
Women's Champions Trophy record
| Year | Round | Position | Played | Won | Lost | Drawn | Tied | No result |
|---|---|---|---|---|---|---|---|---|
| (India) 2027 | Qualified | | | | | | | |

=== World Cup Qualifier ===
Women's Cricket World Cup Qualifier record
| Year | Round | Position | Played | Won | Lost | Drawn | Tied | No result |
|---|---|---|---|---|---|---|---|---|
| 2003 | Did not participate, already qualified for World Cup | | | | | | | |
| 2018 | Did not participate, already qualified for World Cup | | | | | | | |
| 2011 | Semi-final | 3/10 | 6 | 4 | 2 | 0 | 0 | 0 |
| 2017 | Semi-final | 3/10 | 9 | 6 | 3 | 0 | 0 | 0 |
| 2021 | Already Qualified | | | | | | | |
| Total | 0 Title | - | 15 | 10 | 5 | 0 | 0 | 0 |

=== T20 World Cup Qualifier ===
Women's T20 World Cup Qualifier record
| Year | Round | Position | Played | Won | Lost | Drawn | Tied | No result |
|---|---|---|---|---|---|---|---|---|
| (Republic of Ireland) 2013 | Champions | 1/8 | 5 | 4 | 0 | 0 | 0 | 1 |
| (Thailand) 2015 | Did not participate, already qualified for World Cup | | | | | | | |
| (Netherlands) 2018 | Did not participate, already qualified for World Cup | | | | | | | |
| (Scotland) 2019 | Did not participate, already qualified for World Cup | | | | | | | |
| (United Arab Emirates) 2022 | Did not participate, already qualified for World Cup | | | | | | | |
| (United Arab Emirates) 2024 | Champions | 1/10 | 6 | 6 | 0 | 0 | 0 | 0 |
| (Nepal) 2026 | Did not participate, already qualified for World Cup | | | | | | | |
| Total | 2 Title | - | 11 | 10 | 5 | 0 | 0 | 1 |

=== Asia Cup ===
Asia Cup record
| Year | Round | Position | Played | Won | Lost | Tie | NR |
|---|---|---|---|---|---|---|---|
| (Sri Lanka) 2004 | Runners-up | 2/2 | 5 | 0 | 5 | 0 | 0 |
| (Pakistan) 2005–06 | Runners-up | 2/3 | 5 | 2 | 3 | 0 | 0 |
| (India) 2006 | Runners-up | 2/3 | 4 | 2 | 2 | 0 | 0 |
| (Sri Lanka) 2008 | Runners-up | 2/4 | 7 | 4 | 3 | 0 | 0 |
| (China) 2012 | Semi-final | 3/8 | 4 | 2 | 2 | 0 | 0 |
| (Thailand) 2016 | Group Stage | 3/6 | 5 | 3 | 2 | 0 | 0 |
| (Malaysia) 2018 | Group Stage | 4/6 | 5 | 2 | 3 | 0 | 0 |
| (Bangladesh) 2022 | Runners-up | 2/7 | 8 | 5 | 3 | 0 | 0 |
| (Sri Lanka) 2024 | Champions | 1/8 | 5 | 5 | 0 | 0 | 0 |
| (United Arab Emirates) 2026 | Runners-up | 2/8 | 5 | 4 | 1 | 0 | 0 |
| Total | 1 Titles | - | 53 | 29 | 24 | 0 | 0 |

=== Commonwealth Games ===
Commonwealth Games record
| Year | Round | Position | GP | W | L | T | NR |
|---|---|---|---|---|---|---|---|
| (England) 2022 | Group Stage | 8/8 | 3 | 0 | 3 | 0 | 0 |
| Total | 0 Title | - | 3 | 0 | 3 | 0 | 0 |

=== Commonwealth Games Qualifier ===
Commonwealth Games Cricket Qualifier record
| Year | Round | Position | GP | W | L | T | NR |
|---|---|---|---|---|---|---|---|
| (Malaysia) 2022 | Champion | 1/5 | 4 | 4 | 0 | 0 | 0 |
| Total | 1 Title | - | 4 | 4 | 0 | 0 | 0 |

=== Asian Games ===
Asian Games record
| Year | Round | Position | GP | W | L | T | NR |
|---|---|---|---|---|---|---|---|
| (China) 2010 | Did not participate | | | | | | |
| (South Korea) 2014 | Bronze medal | 1/10 | 3 | 2 | 1 | 0 | 0 |
| (China) 2022 | Silver medal | 1/9 | 3 | 2 | 1 | 0 | 0 |
| Total | 1 Title | - | 6 | 4 | 2 | 0 | 0 |

== Honours ==
=== ACC ===
- Women's Asia Cup:
  - Champions (1): 2024
  - Runners-up (5): 2004, 2005–06, 2006, 2008, 2022, 2026

=== Others ===
- Asian Games
  - Silver Medal (1): 2022
  - Bronze Medal (1): 2014
- South Asian Games
  - Silver Medal (1): 2019

== Forthcoming fixtures ==
The recent results and forthcoming fixtures of Sri Lanka in international cricket:

Bilateral series and tours
| Date | Against | H/A/N | Results [Matches] | | |
| Date | Against | H/A/N | Test | WODI | WT20I |
|---|---|---|---|---|---|
| Mar 2025 | New Zealand | Away | – | 0–2 [3] | 1–1 [3] |
| Feb 2026 | West Indies | Away | – | 2–1 [3] | 2–0 [3] |
| Apr 2026 | Bangladesh | Away | – | 2–1 [3] | 3–0 [3] |
| July 2026 | Pakistan | Home | – | 2–1 [3] | 2–1 [3] |

Multiteam series and tournaments
| Date | Series | Format | Position | Results [Matches] |
|---|---|---|---|---|
| 3 – 20 October 2024 | (United Arab Emirates) 2024 Women's T20 World Cup | WT20I | 9th | 0–4 [4] |
| 30 September – 2 November 2025 | (India) 2025 Women's Cricket World Cup | WODI | 5th | 1–3 [7] |
| 12 June – 5 July 2026 | (England) 2026 Women's T20 World Cup | WT20I | 6th | 3-2 [5] |

== Records and statistics ==
International Match Summary — Sri Lanka Women

Last updated 16 August 2024

Playing Record
| Format | M | W | L | T | NR | Inaugural Match |
| Women's Test | 1 | 1 | 0 | 0 | 0 | 20 April 1998 |
| Women's One-Day Internationals | 188 | 60 | 116 | 0 | 7 | 25 November 1997 |
| Women's Twenty20 Internationals | 140 | 45 | 91 | 0 | 4 | 12 June 2009 |

=== Women's Test cricket ===
- Highest team total: 305/9d, v Pakistan on 17 April 1998 at Colts Cricket Club, Colombo.
- Highest individual score: 105*, Chamani Seneviratna v Pakistan on 17 April 1998 at Colts Cricket Club, Colombo.
- Best innings bowling: 5/31, Chamani Seneviratna v Pakistan on 17 April 1998 at Colts Cricket Club, Colombo.

Women's Test record versus other nations

Records complete to Women's Test #106. Last updated 20 April 1998.

| Opponent | Matches | Won | Lost | Tied | N/R | First match | First win |
|---|---|---|---|---|---|---|---|
ICC Full members
| Pakistan | 1 | 1 | 0 | 0 | 0 | 17–20 April 1998 | 17–20 April 1998 |

=== Women's One-Day International ===
- Highest team total: 305/4, v South Africa on 17 April 2024 at Senwes Park, Potchefstroom.
- Highest individual score: 195*, Chamari Athapaththu v South Africa on 17 April 2024 at Senwes Park, Potchefstroom.
- Best innings bowling: 5/2, Suthershini Sivanantham v Pakistan on 22 January 2002 at Moors Sports Club Ground, Colombo.

Most ODI runs for Sri Lanka Women

| Player | Runs | Average | Career span |
|---|---|---|---|
| Chamari Athapaththu † | 4,253 | 34.57 | 2010-2026 |
| Shashikala Siriwardene | 2,029 | 18.44 | 2003-2019 |
| Harshitha Samarawickrama | 1,620 | 35.21 | 2016-2026 |
| Dilani Manodara | 1,363 | 18.93 | 2006-2019 |
| Hasini Perera | 1,350 | 22.13 | 2014-2026 |

Most ODI wickets for Sri Lanka Women

| Player | Wickets | Average | Career span |
|---|---|---|---|
| Shashikala Siriwardene | 124 | 28.84 | 2003-2019 |
| Inoka Ranaweera † | 101 | 31.90 | 2012-2026 |
| Chamani Seneviratna | 72 | 26.11 | 1997-2013 |
| Chamari Athapaththu † | 61 | 37.44 | 2010-2026 |
| Suwini de Alwis | 58 | 21.65 | 2005-2011 |

Highest individual innings in Women's ODI

| Player | Score | Opposition | Venue | Match Date |
|---|---|---|---|---|
| Chamari Athapaththu | 195* | South Africa | Potchefstroom | 17 April 2024 |
| Chamari Athapaththu | 178* | Australia | Bristol | 29 June 2017 |
| Chamari Athapaththu | 140* | Pakistan | Galle | 3 July 2023 |
| Vishmi Gunaratne | 123 | Pakistan | Hambantota | 25 July 2026 |
| Chamari Athapaththu | 115 | New Zealand | Katunayake | 16 September 2018 |

Best bowling figures in an innings in Women's ODI

| Player | Score | Opposition | Venue | Match Date |
|---|---|---|---|---|
| Suthershini Sivanantham | 5/2 | Pakistan | Colombo(Moors) | 22 January 2002 |
| Sandamali Dolawatte | 5/16 | West Indies | Kingstown | 22 March 2003 |
| Sachini Nisansala | 5/28 | West Indies | Hambantota | 21 June 2024 |
| Oshadi Ranasinghe | 5/34 | Bangladesh | Colombo(SSC) | 04 May 2023 |
| Dewmi Vihanga | 5/43 | South Africa | Colombo(RPS) | 09 May 2025 |

WODI record versus other nations

Records complete to WODI #1402. Last updated 05 August 2026.

| Opponent | Matches | Won | Lost | Tied | N/R | First match | First win |
|---|---|---|---|---|---|---|---|
ICC Full members
| Australia | 11 | 0 | 11 | 0 | 0 | 1 December 2000 | |
| Bangladesh | 7 | 5 | 0 | 0 | 1 | 19 February 2017 | 25 February 2017 |
| England | 21 | 1 | 18 | 0 | 1 | 21 December 1997 | 2023 |
| India | 36 | 3 | 32 | 0 | 1 | 15 December 2000 | 5 February 2013 |
| Ireland | 7 | 4 | 1 | 0 | 1 | 5 December 2000 | 5 December 2000 |
| New Zealand | 17 | 2 | 13 | 0 | 0 | 13 December 1997 | 27 June 2023 |
| Pakistan | 37 | 24 | 12 | 0 | 1 | 11 April 1998 | 11 April 1998 |
| South Africa | 26 | 6 | 17 | 0 | 2 | 8 December 2000 | 1 April 2005 |
| West Indies | 38 | 19 | 19 | 0 | 0 | 11 December 1997 | 11 December 1997 |
ICC Associate members
| Netherlands | 13 | 10 | 3 | 0 | 0 | 25 November 1997 | 29 November 1997 |

=== Women's T20I cricket ===
- Highest team total: 191/6 v India on 28 December 2025 at Trivandrum International Stadium, Trivandrum.
- Highest individual innings: 119*, Chamari Athapaththu v Malaysia on 22 July 2024 at Rangiri Dambulla International Stadium, Dambulla.
- Best innings bowling: 7/5, Chamari Athapaththu v Indonisia on 2 September 2026 at Dubai International Stadium, Dubai.

Most WT20I runs for Sri Lanka Women

| Player | Runs | Career span |
|---|---|---|
| Chamari Athapaththu† | 4,136 | 2009-2026 |
| Harshitha Samarawickrama† | 1,935 | 2016-2026 |
| Nilakshi de Silva† | 1,482 | 2013-2026 |
| Shashikala Siriwardene | 1,097 | 2010-2020 |
| Hasini Perera† | 1065 | 2014-2026 |

Most WT20I wickets for Sri Lanka Women

| Player | Wickets | Career span |
|---|---|---|
| Inoka Ranaweera† | 97 | 2012-2026 |
| Chamari Athapaththu† | 89 | 2009-2026 |
| Udeshika Prabodhani | 84 | 2009-2024 |
| Sugandika Kumari† | 81 | 2015-2026 |
| Kavisha Dilhari† | 79 | 2018-2026 |

Best bowling figures in an innings in Women's T20I

| Player | Score | Opposition | Venue | Match Date |
|---|---|---|---|---|
| Chamari Athapaththu | 7/5 | Indonesia | Dubai | 02 September 2026 |
| Malsha Shehani | 4/2 | Malaysia | Sylhet | 08 October 2022 |
| Inoka Ranaweera | 4/7 | Bangladesh | Sylhet | 10 October 2022 |
| Shashikala Siriwardene | 4/9 | Pakistan | Colombo(NCC) | 30 March 2018 |
| Inoshi Priyadharshani | 4/10 | Thailand | Hangzhou | 22 September 2023 |

WT20I record versus other nations

As of 6 September 2026

| Opponent | Matches | Won | Lost | Tied | N/R |
|---|---|---|---|---|---|
ICC Full members
| Australia | 8 | 0 | 8 | 0 | 0 |
| Bangladesh | 17 | 14 | 3 | 0 | 0 |
| England | 13 | 2 | 11 | 0 | 0 |
| India | 31 | 5 | 25 | 0 | 1 |
| Ireland | 6 | 5 | 1 | 0 | 0 |
| New Zealand | 18 | 3 | 14 | 0 | 0 |
| Pakistan | 24 | 11 | 12 | 0 | 1 |
| South Africa | 17 | 6 | 11 | 0 | 0 |
| West Indies | 30 | 7 | 21 | 0 | 1 |
ICC Associate members
| Indonesia | 1 | 1 | 0 | 0 | 0 |
| Kenya | 1 | 1 | 0 | 0 | 0 |
| Malaysia | 4 | 4 | 0 | 0 | 0 |
| Netherlands | 1 | 0 | 0 | 0 | 1 |
| Scotland | 4 | 4 | 0 | 0 | 0 |
| Thailand | 5 | 4 | 1 | 0 | 0 |
| Uganda | 1 | 1 | 0 | 0 | 0 |
| United Arab Emirates | 3 | 3 | 0 | 0 | 0 |
| United States | 1 | 1 | 0 | 0 | 0 |

== Current squad ==
This is a list of active players who are centrally contracted with SLC or have played for Sri Lanka in the past 12 months or have been named in the recent ODI or T20I squad. Uncapped players are listed in italics.

Last updated: 15 August 2026

Keys
| Symbol | Meaning |
|---|---|
| C | Contracted Players |
| S/N | Shirt number of the player in all formats |
| Format | Denotes the particular format/s played over the last year, not entire career |

| Name | Age | Batting style | Bowling style | Forms | S/N | Last ODI | Last T20I | Captain |
Batters
| Harshitha Samarawickrama | 28 | Left-handed | Right arm medium | ODI, T20I | 88 | (Australia) 2025 | (Bangladesh) 2025 | |
| Nilakshi De Silva | 37 | Right-handed | Right-arm medium | ODI, T20I | 27 | (Zimbabwe) 2025 | (Zimbabwe) 2025 | |
| Imesha Dulani | 24 | Right-handed | —N/a | ODI, T20I | 9 | (Cricket West Indies) 2026 | (England) 2026 | |
| Vishmi Gunaratne | 21 | Right-handed | —N/a | ODI, T20I | 62 | (Cricket West Indies) 2026 | (Pakistan) 2026 | |
| Hansima Karunaratne | 33 | Right-handed | Right-arm medium | ODI | 91 | (India) 2026 | —N/a | |
| Hasini Perera | 31 | Left-handed | Right-arm medium | ODI | 72 | (India) 2026 | —N/a | |
| Kawya Kavindi | 24 | Right-handed | Right-arm medium | T20I | 81 | (India) 2026 | —N/a | |
| Sanjana Kavindi | 17 | Left-handed | —N/a | T20I | 50 | (India) 2026 | —N/a | |
Wicket-keeper-batters
| Kaushini Nuthyangana | 24 | Right-handed | —N/a | T20I | 33 | (India) 2026 | (Bangladesh) 2025 | |
| Anushka Sanjeewani | 36 | Right-handed | —N/a | ODI | 17 | (England) 2026 | (England) 2026 | |
All-rounders
| Ama Kanchana | 35 | Right-handed | Right-arm medium-fast | ODI | 97 | (Zimbabwe) 2024 | (Afghanistan) 2023 | |
| Chamari Athapaththu | 36 | Left-handed | Right-arm off break | ODI, T20I | 58 | (England) 2026 | (United Arab Emirates) 2026 | |
| Kavisha Dilhari | 25 | Right-handed | Right-arm off break | ODI, T20I | 6 | (England) 2026 | (England) 2026 | |
Spin Bowlers
| Inoka Ranaweera | 40 | Left-handed | Slow left-arm orthodox | ODI, T20I | 18 | (India) 2026 | (South Africa) 2018 | |
| Oshadi Ranasinghe | 40 | Left-handed | Right-arm off break | T20I | 86 | (Australia) 2025 | (Australia) 2025 | |
| Inoshi Priyadarshani | 39 | Right-handed | Right-arm off break | ODI, T20I | 52 | (Pakistan) 2022 | (Pakistan) 2025 | |
| Sugandika Kumari | 35 | Left-handed | Slow left-arm orthodox | ODI, T20I | 91 | (Australia) 2025 | (United Arab Emirates) 2026 | |
| Sachini Nisansala | 25 | Left-handed | Slow left-arm orthodox | T20I | 11 | (India) 2026 | (Australia) 2025 | |
| Chamudi Praboda | 17 | Left-handed | Slow left-arm orthodox | ODI, T20I | 75 | (India) 2026 | (United Arab Emirates) 2026 | |
Pace Bowlers
| Achini Kulasuriya | 36 | Right-handed | Right-arm medium-fast | ODI | 78 | (India) 2026 | (England) 2026 | |
| Chethana Vimukthi | 24 | Right-handed | Right-arm medium-fast | ODI | 5 | (India) 2026 | (England) 2026 | |
| Mithali Ayodhya | 19 | Right-handed | Right-arm medium-fast | ODI | 99 | (India) 2026 | (England) 2026 | |
| Udeshika Prabodhani | 41 | Right-handed | Left-arm medium-fast | T20I | 71 | (India) 2026 | (India) 2026 | |

== See also ==
- List of Sri Lanka women ODI cricketers
- List of Sri Lanka women Twenty20 International cricketers
- List of Sri Lanka women Test cricketers
- Sri Lankan men's cricket team
