= 2021–22 Pakistan Women's One Day Cup =

Pakistan women's one-day cricket competition

- Dates: 9 – 21 September 2021
- Administrator(s): Pakistan Cricket Board
- Cricket format: 50 over
- Tournament format(s): Round-robin and final
- Champions: PCB Challengers (1st title)
- Participants: 4
- Matches: 14
- Player of the series: Aliya Riaz (Dynamites); Nida Dar (Blasters)
- Most runs: Aliya Riaz (364)
- Most wickets: Nida Dar (14); Anoosha Nazir (14); Saba Nazir (14)

The 2021–22 Pakistan Women's One Day Cup was a 50-over women's cricket competition that took place in Pakistan in September 2021. It was the first edition of the competition under its new name, and saw the addition of a new team, PCB Strikers to take the number of competing teams to four. All matches took place in Karachi, at the National Stadium and the Pakistan Cricket Board Academy Ground.

PCB Challengers defeated defending champions PCB Blasters in the final by 68 runs to claim their first one-day title. PCB Strikers won the third place play-off against PCB Dynamites.

== Competition format ==
The four teams played in a double round-robin group, playing each other team twice. The top two teams in the group advanced to the final, whilst third and fourth played in the third place play-off. Matches were played using a 50 over format.

The group worked on a points system with positions within the group being based on the total points. Points were awarded as follows:

Win: 2 points.
Tie: 1 point.
Loss: 0 points.
No Result/Abandoned: 1 point.

If points in the final table were equal, teams were separated by most wins, then fewest loses, then Net Run Rate.

== Squads ==
The squads for the four teams were announced by the Pakistan Cricket Board on 5 September 2021.

PCB Blasters Coach: Waqar Orakzai	PCB Challengers Coach: Waseem Yousafzai	PCB Dynamites Coach: Muhammad Kamran Hussain	PCB Strikers Coach: Arshad Khan
Sidra Nawaz (c) (wk); Aisha Jawed; Arijah Haseeb; Fajar Naveed; Fatima Sana; Gul Feroza (wk); Momina Riasat; Nahida Khan; Nida Dar; Noreen Yaqub; Omaima Sohail; Saima Malik; Shawal Zulfiqar; Syeda Aroob Shah	Javeria Khan (c); Anoosha Nasir; Diana Baig; Dua Majid; Fareeha Mehmood; Gull Rukh; Iram Javed; Khadija Chishty; Najiha Alvi (wk); Nazish Rafiq; Saba Nazir; Sidra Ameen; Syeda Masooma Zahra; Waheeda Akhtar	Muneeba Ali (c) (wk); Aliya Riaz; Fatima Zahra; Ghulam Fatima; Humna Bilal; Huraina Sajjad; Kaynat Hafeez; Maham Tariq; Nashra Sandhu; Neha Sharmin; Rida Aslam; Sadaf Shamas; Soha Fatima (wk); Syeda Insharah Asad	Kainat Imtiaz (c); Aima Saleem; Ayesha Naseem; Ayesha Zafar; Bisma Amjad; Fatima Khan; Gul Uswa; Hafsa Khalid; Javeria Rauf; Natalia Pervaiz; Umme Hani; Asma Amin (wk); Tuba Hassan; Yusra Amir (wk)

== Points table ==
Team	Pld	W	L	T	NR	A	Pts	NRR
PCB Challengers (Q)	6	5	1	0	0	0	10	+1.200
PCB Blasters (Q)	6	5	1	0	0	0	10	+0.438
PCB Strikers	6	2	4	0	0	0	4	–0.831
PCB Dynamites	6	0	6	0	0	0	0	–0.831

Source: Pakistan Cricket Board

== Fixtures ==
=== Group stage ===
9 September 2021
Scorecard

PCB Dynamites; 186/6 (45 overs)	v	PCB Blasters; 187/4 (40.4 overs)
Muneeba Ali 62 (79); Nida Dar 2/22 (9 overs)		Nahida Khan 90* (112); Ghulam Fatima 2/39 (9 overs)

PCB Blasters won by 6 wickets
National Stadium, Karachi
Umpires: Nasir Hussain and Waleed Yaqub
Player of the match: Nahida Khan (Blasters)

- PCB Dynamites won the toss and elected to bat.
- Match reduced to 45 overs per side due to rain.

9 September 2021
Scorecard

PCB Challengers; 256/7 (50 overs)	v	PCB Strikers; 106 (35.5 overs)
Iram Javed 91 (66); Natalia Pervaiz 2/41 (10 overs)		Natalia Pervaiz 22 (46); Waheeda Akhtar 2/18 (8 overs)

PCB Challengers won by 150 runs
Pakistan Cricket Board Academy Ground, Karachi
Umpires: Saleema Imtiaz and Saqib Khan
Player of the match: Iram Javed (Challengers)

- PCB Challengers won the toss and elected to bat.

11 September 2021
Scorecard

PCB Blasters; 195 (47.3 overs)	v	PCB Strikers; 148 (41.4 overs)
Nahida Khan 59 (74); Hafsa Khalid 4/34 (10 overs)		Ayesha Zafar 33 (33); Omaima Sohail 3/20 (7 overs)

PCB Blasters won by 47 runs
Pakistan Cricket Board Academy Ground, Karachi
Umpires: Saleema Imtiaz and Waleed Yaqub
Player of the match: Nahida Khan (Blasters)

- PCB Strikers won the toss and elected to field.

11 September 2021
Scorecard

PCB Challengers; 253/4 (50 overs)	v	PCB Dynamites; 252/8 (50 overs)
Sidra Ameen 70 (96); Ghulam Fatima 2/35 (10 overs)		Aliya Riaz 90 (102); Saba Nazir 3/56 (10 overs)

PCB Challengers won by 1 run
National Stadium, Karachi
Umpires: Nasir Hussain and Saqib Khan
Player of the match: Sidra Ameen (Challengers)

- PCB Dynamites won the toss and elected to field.

13 September 2021
Scorecard

PCB Blasters; 59 (31.2 overs)	v	PCB Challengers; 60/4 (21 overs)
Sidra Nawaz 19 (45); Waheeda Akhtar 4/11 (9 overs)		Sidra Ameen 25* (54); Nida Dar 3/16 (8 overs)

PCB Challengers won by 6 wickets
Pakistan Cricket Board Academy Ground, Karachi
Umpires: Nasir Hussain and Saleema Imtiaz
Player of the match: Waheeda Akhtar (Challengers)

- PCB Blasters won the toss and elected to bat.

13 September 2021
Scorecard

PCB Strikers; 237/8 (50 overs)	v	PCB Dynamites; 172 (43.2 overs)
Ayesha Zafar 65 (66); Ghulam Fatima 2/30 (10 overs)		Muneeba Ali 51 (70); Tuba Hassan 4/28 (7.2 overs)

PCB Strikers won by 65 runs
National Stadium, Karachi
Umpires: Saqib Khan and Waleed Yaqub
Player of the match: Tuba Hassan (Strikers)

- PCB Strikers won the toss and elected to bat.

15 September 2021
Scorecard

PCB Dynamites; 104 (39.2 overs)	v	PCB Blasters; 105/2 (24.1 overs)
Sadaf Shamas 33 (53); Syeda Aroob Shah 4/25 (10 overs)		Nahida Khan 43* (65); Ghulam Fatima 1/24 (6.1 overs)

PCB Blasters won by 8 wickets
Pakistan Cricket Board Academy Ground, Karachi
Umpires: Nasir Hussain and Saleema Imtiaz
Player of the match: Syeda Aroob Shah (Blasters)

- PCB Blasters won the toss and elected to field.

15 September 2021
Scorecard

PCB Strikers; 163 (45.1 overs)	v	PCB Challengers; 164/2 (31.1 overs)
Ayesha Zafar 38 (42); Anoosha Nasir 5/37 (10 overs)		Javeria Khan 80* (80); Fatima Khan 1/11 (1 over)

PCB Challengers won by 8 wickets
National Stadium, Karachi
Umpires: Saqib Khan and Waleed Yaqub
Player of the match: Anoosha Nasir (Challengers)

- PCB Strikers won the toss and elected to bat.

17 September 2021
Scorecard

PCB Strikers; 183 (48.1 overs)	v	PCB Blasters; 187/1 (38.4 overs)
Javeria Rauf 58 (88); Omaima Sohail 4/24 (9.1 overs)		Gul Feroza 85 (104); Ayesha Zafar 1/10 (2 overs)

PCB Blasters won by 9 wickets
National Stadium, Karachi
Umpires: Imran Javed and Qaiser Waheed
Player of the match: Nahida Khan (Blasters)

- PCB Blasters won the toss and elected to field.

17 September 2021
Scorecard

PCB Dynamites; 240/6 (50 overs)	v	PCB Challengers; 243/5 (48.3 overs)
Muneeba Ali 117 (141); Dua Majid 3/55 (10 overs)		Javeria Khan 83 (95); Aliya Riaz 1/10 (3 overs)

PCB Challengers won by 5 wickets
Pakistan Cricket Board Academy Ground, Karachi
Umpires: Imtiaz Iqbal and Sabahat Rashid
Player of the match: Muneeba Ali (Dynamites) and Javeria Khan (Challengers)

- PCB Dynamites won the toss and elected to bat.

19 September 2021
Scorecard

PCB Challengers; 148 (49.3 overs)	v	PCB Blasters; 152/8 (46 overs)
Sidra Ameen 19 (37); Saima Malik 3/27 (10 overs)		Nida Dar 93* (117); Waheeda Akhtar 3/18 (9 overs)

PCB Blasters won by 2 wickets
National Stadium, Karachi
Umpires: Imran Javed and Imtiaz Iqbal
Player of the match: Nida Dar (Blasters)

- PCB Challengers won the toss and elected to bat.

19 September 2021
Scorecard

PCB Dynamites; 182 (48.1 overs)	v	PCB Strikers; 183/3 (44.4 overs)
Muneeba Ali 85 (120); Kainat Imtiaz 3/30 (8 overs)		Javeria Rauf 88* (138); Ghulam Fatima 1/30 (10 overs)

PCB Strikers won by 7 wickets
Pakistan Cricket Board Academy Ground, Karachi
Umpires: Qaiser Waheed and Sabahat Rashid
Player of the match: Javeria Rauf (Strikers)

- PCB Strikers won the toss and elected to field.

=== Third place play-off ===
21 September 2021
Scorecard

PCB Dynamites; 198/8 (50 overs)	v	PCB Strikers; 204/5 (47 overs)
Aliya Riaz 101 (113); Umme Hani 3/27 (10 overs)		Hafsa Khalid 64* (110); Ghulam Fatima 2/25 (10 overs)

PCB Strikers won by 5 wickets
Pakistan Cricket Board Academy Ground, Karachi
Umpires: Imran Javed and Sabahat Rashid
Player of the match: Hafsa Khalid (Strikers)

- PCB Strikers won the toss and elected to field.

=== Final ===
21 September 2021
Scorecard

PCB Challengers; 210/8 (50 overs)	v	PCB Blasters; 142 (42.5 overs)
Javeria Khan 87 (128); Saima Malik 2/24 (10 overs)		Omaima Sohail 38 (64); Dua Majid 3/29 (9 overs)

PCB Challengers won by 68 runs
National Stadium, Karachi
Umpires: Imtiaz Iqbal and Qaiser Waheed
Player of the match: Javeria Khan (Challengers)

- PCB Blasters won the toss and elected to field.

== Statistics ==
=== Most runs ===
Player	Team	Matches	Innings	Runs	Average	HS	100s	50s
Aliya Riaz	PCB Dynamites	7	7	364	60.66	101	1	3
Muneeba Ali	PCB Dynamites	7	7	358	51.14	117	1	3
Javeria Khan	PCB Challengers	7	7	355	59.16	87	0	4
Nahida Khan	PCB Blasters	7	7	282	70.50	90*	0	3
Iram Javed	PCB Challengers	7	7	270	67.50	91	0	2

Source: CricketArchive

=== Most wickets ===
Player	Team	Overs	Wickets	Average	BBI	5w
Nida Dar	PCB Blasters	61.4	14	10.71	3/16	0
Anoosha Nasir	PCB Challengers	59.2	14	13.71	5/37	1
Saba Nazir	PCB Challengers	59.0	14	16.21	3/56	0
Omaima Sohail	PCB Blasters	50.1	10	17.00	4/24	0
Waheeda Akhtar	PCB Challengers	60.0	10	17.10	4/11	0

Source: CricketArchive
