= PCB Dynamites =

Pakistani women's cricket team

Personnel
- Captain: Umm-e-Hani
- Coach: Taufiq Umar

Team information
- Colours: Blue
- Founded: 2018

History
- ODC wins: 2
- WT20 wins: 0

PCB Dynamites are a Pakistani women's cricket team that compete in the Pakistan Women's One Day Cup and the PCB Women's Twenty20 Tournament. The team has no geographical base, instead being made up of some of the best players from across Pakistan. They are captained by Umm-e-Hani and coached by Taufeeq Umar. They won the first two editions of the Pakistan Women's One Day Cup, in 2017–18 and 2018–19.

== History ==
PCB Dynamites were formed in 2018, ahead of the 2017–18 PCB Triangular One Day Women's Tournament. They were captained by Javeria Khan. They finished top of the group, winning three of their four matches, progressing to the final. They won the final against PCB Challengers by 190 runs, helped by centuries from Javeria Khan and Nida Dar, to win their first title. The following season, 2018–19, Dynamites retained their title, finishing second in the group before beating PCB Blasters in the final.

In 2019–20, PCB Dynamites also competed in a new competition, the PCB Triangular Twenty20 Women's Tournament. They finished bottom of the group stage of the T20 tournament, winning two of their four matches but being eliminated on Net Run Rate. In the one-day competition, Dynamites again finished bottom of the group, winning just one match.

In 2020–21, only the T20 tournament was played. PCB Challengers second in the group, winning two of their four matches, with one abandoned. They lost the final against PCB Challengers by 7 runs. Dynamites batter Nahida Khan was the leading run-scorer in the tournament, with 154 runs. In 2021–22 the side competed in the newly renamed Pakistan Women's One Day Cup, captained by Muneeba Ali. Dynamites lost all six of their matches, as well as losing to new side PCB Strikers in the third place play-off. Dynamites batter Aliya Riaz was the leading run-scorer in the competition, however, with 364 runs. In 2022–23, in the Women's Twenty20 Tournament, they finished top of the initial group stage, but lost in the final to PCB Blasters by 7 runs.

== Players ==
=== Current squad ===
Based on squad for the 2022–23 season. Players in bold have international caps.

| Name | Nationality | Birth date | Batting style | Bowling style | Notes |
Batters
| Aleena Shah | Pakistan | 23 March 1997 (age 28) | Right-handed | Right-arm off break | |
All-rounders
| **Kainat Imtiaz** | Pakistan | 21 June 1992 (age 33) | Right-handed | Right-arm medium-fast | |
| **Nahida Khan** | Pakistan | 3 November 1986 (age 38) | Right-handed | Right-arm medium | |
| **Nida Dar** | Pakistan | 2 January 1987 (age 38) | Right-handed | Right-arm off break | |
| **Sadaf Shamas** | Pakistan | 13 December 1998 (age 26) | Right-handed | Right-arm medium | |
| **Umm-e-Hani** | Pakistan | 12 August 1996 (age 29) | Right-handed | Right-arm off break | Captain |
Wicket-keepers
| **Gull Feroza** | Pakistan | 28 December 1998 (age 26) | Right-handed | – | |
| **Sidra Nawaz** | Pakistan | 14 March 1994 (age 31) | Right-handed | – | |
| Yusra Aamir | Pakistan | 10 December 1993 (age 31) | Right-handed | Right-arm medium-fast | |
Bowlers
| Gul Uswa | Pakistan | 13 December 2002 (age 22) | Right-handed | Right-arm medium | |
| **Sadia Iqbal** | Pakistan | 5 August 1995 (age 30) | Left-handed | Slow left-arm orthodox | |
| Saima Malik | Pakistan | 5 July 1999 (age 26) | Right-handed | Left-arm medium-fast | |
| Saira Jabeen | Pakistan | Unknown | Right-handed | Right-arm medium | |
| **Tuba Hassan** | Pakistan | 18 October 2000 (age 24) | Left-handed | Right-arm leg break | |
| Waheeda Akhtar | Pakistan | 10 April 1995 (age 30) | Right-handed | Right-arm medium-fast | |

== Seasons ==
=== Pakistan Women's One Day Cup ===
| Season | League standings | | | | | | | | Notes |
| Season | P | W | L | T | A/C | Pts | NRR | Pos | Notes |
|---|---|---|---|---|---|---|---|---|---|
| 2017–18 | 4 | 3 | 0 | 0 | 1 | 7 | +0.636 | 1st | Champions |
| 2018–19 | 4 | 2 | 2 | 0 | 0 | 4 | +0.214 | 2nd | Champions |
| 2019–20 | 4 | 1 | 3 | 0 | 0 | 2 | –0.504 | 3rd | |
| 2021–22 | 6 | 0 | 6 | 0 | 0 | 0 | –0.831 | 4th | Lost Third Place Play-off |

=== PCB Women's Twenty20 Tournament ===
| Season | League standings | | | | | | | | Notes |
| Season | P | W | L | T | A/C | Pts | NRR | Pos | Notes |
|---|---|---|---|---|---|---|---|---|---|
| 2019–20 | 4 | 2 | 2 | 0 | 0 | 4 | –0.703 | 3rd | |
| 2020–21 | 4 | 2 | 1 | 0 | 1 | 5 | +0.175 | 2nd | Lost final |
| 2022–23 | 3 | 2 | 1 | 0 | 0 | 4 | +0.400 | 1st | Lost final |

== Honours ==
- Pakistan Women's One Day Cup:
  - Winners (2): 2017–18 & 2018–19
- PCB Women's Twenty20 Tournament:
  - Winners (0):
  - Best finish: Runners-up (2020–21 & 2022–23)
