= Departmental T20 Women's Championship =

Pakistan women's Twenty20 cricket competition

- Countries: Pakistan
- Administrator: Pakistan Cricket Board (PCB)
- Format: Twenty20
- First edition: 2018
- Latest edition: 2018–19
- Tournament format: Double round-robin and final
- Number of teams: 4
- Current champion: Zarai Taraqiati Bank Limited (2nd title)
- Most successful: Zarai Taraqiati Bank Limited (2 titles)

The Departmental T20 Women's Championship was a women's domestic Twenty20 competition that took place in Pakistan in 2018 and 2018–19. Four teams, three departmental and one XI formed by the Pakistan Cricket Board, competed in the double round-robin group stage.

Zarai Taraqiati Bank Limited won both editions of the tournament. The tournament was replaced by the PCB Triangular Twenty20 Women's Tournament in the 2019–20 season.

== History ==
The Departmental T20 Women's Championship was established in 2018, replacing the Women's Cricket Challenge Trophy. Four teams, Higher Education Commission, State Bank of Pakistan, Zarai Taraqiati Bank Limited (ZTBL) and a PCB XI, competed in a Twenty20 double round-robin group held at the National Stadium, Karachi in May 2018. ZTBL and PCB XI progressed to the final, which the ZTBL won by 46 runs, helped by half-centuries from Nain Abidi and Bismah Maroof.

The following edition of the tournament took place in the 2018–19 season at Diamond Club Ground, Islamabad in March and April 2019. ZTBL and State Bank of Pakistan qualified for the final, which was again won by ZTBL, with Javeria Khan making a half-century for the victors. The following season, the tournament was replaced by the PCB Triangular Twenty20 Women's Tournament.

== Teams ==
Team	First	Last	Titles
Higher Education Commission	2018	2018–19	0
PCB XI	2018	2018–19	0
State Bank of Pakistan	2018	2018–19	0
Zarai Taraqiati Bank Limited	2018	2018–19	2

== Results ==
Season	Winners	Runners-up	Leading run-scorer	Leading wicket-taker	Refs
2018	Zarai Taraqiati Bank Limited	PCB XI	Nain Abidi (ZTBL) 223	Nida Dar (ZTBL); Diana Baig (ZTBL); Saba Nazir (PCB); Sania Khan (PCB) 9	
2018–19	Zarai Taraqiati Bank Limited	State Bank of Pakistan	Javeria Khan (ZTBL) 240	Almas Akram (ZTBL) 12	

== See also ==
- Women's Cricket Challenge Trophy
- PCB Triangular Twenty20 Women's Tournament
