= Pakistan Women's One-Day Cup =

Pakistan women's one-day cricket competition

Pakistan Women's One Day Cup
- Countries: Pakistan
- Administrator: Pakistan Cricket Board (PCB)
- Format: Limited overs cricket (50 overs per side)
- First edition: 2017–18
- Latest edition: 2022–23
- Tournament format: Round-robin and final
- Number of teams: 3
- Current champion: PCB Dynamites (3rd title)
- Most successful: PCB Dynamites (3 titles)
- Website: Pakistan Cricket Board

The Pakistan Women's One Day Cup, previously the PCB Triangular One Day Women's Tournament, is a women's domestic one-day cricket competition organised by the Pakistan Cricket Board. The tournament first took place in 2017–18, with three teams taking part: PCB Blasters, PCB Challengers and PCB Dynamites. In 2021–22, PCB Strikers joined the competition, before being removed ahead of the 2022–23 season. The competition has run alongside the PCB Triangular Twenty20 Women's Tournament.

PCB Dynamites are the most successful side in the history of the competition, with three titles. They are also the current holders, after winning the 2022–23 tournament.

== History ==
The tournament was established in 2017–18 as the PCB Triangular One Day Women's Tournament, effectively replacing the National Women's Cricket Championship. Three teams, PCB Blasters, PCB Challengers and PCB Dynamites, made up of the best players from across Pakistan, competed in a round-robin group across a week in February 2018 at Multan Cricket Stadium. The Challengers and the Dynamites progressed to the final, which the Dynamites won by 190 runs, helped by centuries from Javeria Khan and Nida Dar.

PCB Dynamites also won the tournament the following season, 2018–19, beating PCB Blasters in the final. The tournament took place in December 2018, at State Bank of Pakistan Sports Complex, Karachi. In 2019–20, with the tournament was held at Bagh-e-Jinnah, Lahore, as PCB Blasters won their first title, beating PCB Challengers in the final by 6 runs.

After no tournament took place in 2020–21 due to the COVID-19 pandemic, the competition returned in 2021–22 as the Pakistan Women's One Day Cup, with a new team, PCB Strikers, competing for the first time. The tournament took place in September 2021 at the National Stadium and the Pakistan Cricket Board Academy Ground, both in Karachi. The tournament was won by PCB Challengers, who beat PCB Blasters in the final by 68 runs. The tournament next took place in May and June 2023, with three teams taking part after the removal of PCB Strikers. PCB Dynamites beat PCB Challengers in the final by 132 runs.

== Teams ==
Team	First	Last	Titles
PCB Blasters	2017–18	2022–23	1
PCB Challengers	2017–18	2022–23	1
PCB Dynamites	2017–18	2022–23	3
PCB Strikers	2021–22	2021–22	0

== Results ==
Season	1st	2nd	3rd	4th	Leading run-scorer	Leading wicket-taker	Ref
2017–18	PCB Dynamites	PCB Challengers	PCB Blasters		Kainat Imtiaz (Blasters) 168	Ghulam Fatima (Blasters) 9	
2018–19	PCB Dynamites	PCB Blasters	PCB Challengers		Aliya Riaz (Blasters) 256	5 bowlers (Note: Nashra Sandhu (Dynamites), Saba Nazir (Dynamites), Diana Baig (Blasters), Rameen Shamim (Blasters) and Aliya Riaz (Blasters) all took 9 wickets.)	
2019–20	PCB Blasters	PCB Challengers	PCB Dynamites		Sidra Ameen (Blasters) 216	Syeda Aroob Shah (Challengers) 14	
2021–22	PCB Challengers	PCB Blasters	PCB Strikers	PCB Dynamites	Aliya Riaz (Dynamites) 364	Nida Dar (Blasters); Anoosha Nazir (Challengers); Saba Nazir (Challengers) 14	
2022–23	PCB Dynamites	PCB Challengers	PCB Blasters		Sidra Ameen (Dynamites) 269	Ghulam Fatima (Dynamites) 12	

== See also ==
- PCB Triangular Twenty20 Women's Tournament
- Pakistan Cup
