= Pakistan women's cricket team in South Africa in 2020–21 =

International cricket tour

	South Africa women	Pakistan women
- Dates: 20 January – 3 February 2021
Captains	Suné Luus	Javeria Khan (Note: Aliya Riaz captained Pakistan Women for the 1st and 2nd WT20Is.)

One Day International series
- Results: South Africa women won the 3-match series 3–0
Most runs	Laura Wolvaardt (125)	Aliya Riaz (136)
Most wickets	Ayabonga Khaka (7); Shabnim Ismail (7)	Diana Baig (9)
- Player of the series: Shabnim Ismail (SA)

Twenty20 International series
- Results: South Africa women won the 3-match series 2–1
Most runs	Tazmin Brits (118)	Kainat Imtiaz (79)
Most wickets	Shabnim Ismail (7)	Anam Amin (4)
- Player of the series: Tazmin Brits (SA)

The Pakistan women's cricket team toured South Africa to play against the South Africa women's cricket team in January and February 2021. The tour consisted of three Women's One Day Internationals (WODIs) and three Women's Twenty20 Internationals (WT20Is). Originally, some of the fixtures were scheduled to be played at the City Oval in Pietermaritzburg. However, on 10 January 2021, Cricket South Africa updated the tour itinerary with all the matches being played at the Kingsmead Cricket Ground in Durban.

Ahead of the series, Pakistan's captain Bismah Maroof withdrew from the tour due to family reasons. Javeria Khan was named as Pakistan's captain in her absence. South Africa's captain, Dane van Niekerk, was also ruled out of the series while she recovered from a back injury. Suné Luus was named as South Africa's captain in place of van Niekerk.

In the opening WODI match, South Africa beat Pakistan by three runs, after the hosts scored 200/9 batting first. South Africa won the second WODI by 13 runs to take an unassailable lead in the series. The hosts won the third and final WODI by 32 runs, winning the series 3–0.

Javeria Khan was ruled out of Pakistan's squad for the first WT20I due to an injury, with Aliya Riaz leading the side in her absence. South Africa went on to win the opening WT20I by eight wickets. Aliya Riaz also lead Pakistan in the second WT20I, but South Africa won the match by seven wickets to take the series. Javeria Khan returned for the final WT20I, hitting an unbeaten 56 runs. Pakistan went on to win the match by eight runs, to register their first win on the tour, with South Africa winning the series 2–1.

== Squads ==
WODIs		WT20Is	
South Africa	Pakistan	South Africa	Pakistan
Suné Luus (c); Anneke Bosch; Tazmin Brits; Trisha Chetty (wk); Nadine de Klerk; Mignon du Preez; Lara Goodall; Shabnim Ismail; Sinalo Jafta; Marizanne Kapp; Ayabonga Khaka; Masabata Klaas; Lizelle Lee; Nonkululeko Mlaba; Tumi Sekhukhune; Nondumiso Shangase; Faye Tunnicliffe; Laura Wolvaardt	Javeria Khan (c); Muneeba Ali; Anam Amin; Aiman Anwer; Diana Baig; Nida Dar; Sadia Iqbal; Kainat Imtiaz; Nahida Khan; Ayesha Naseem; Sidra Nawaz (wk); Aliya Riaz; Fatima Sana; Nashra Sandhu; Syeda Aroob Shah; Omaima Sohail; Ayesha Zafar	Suné Luus (c); Anneke Bosch; Tazmin Brits; Trisha Chetty (wk); Nadine de Klerk; Mignon du Preez; Lara Goodall; Shabnim Ismail; Sinalo Jafta; Marizanne Kapp; Ayabonga Khaka; Masabata Klaas; Lizelle Lee; Nonkululeko Mlaba; Tumi Sekhukhune; Nondumiso Shangase; Faye Tunnicliffe; Laura Wolvaardt	Javeria Khan (c); Muneeba Ali; Anam Amin; Aiman Anwer; Diana Baig; Nida Dar; Sadia Iqbal; Kainat Imtiaz; Nahida Khan; Ayesha Naseem; Sidra Nawaz (wk); Aliya Riaz; Fatima Sana; Nashra Sandhu; Syeda Aroob Shah; Omaima Sohail; Ayesha Zafar

== WODI series ==
=== 1st WODI ===
20 January 2021
10:00
Scorecard

South Africa; 200/9 (50 overs)	v	Pakistan; 197/8 (50 overs)
Marizanne Kapp 47 (58); Diana Baig 3/46 (10 overs)		Nida Dar 59* (93); Shabnim Ismail 3/42 (10 overs)

South Africa Women won by 3 runs
Kingsmead, Durban
Umpires: Lauren Agenbag (SA) and Stephen Harris (SA)
Player of the match: Shabnim Ismail (SA)

- Pakistan Women won the toss and elected to field.
- Nonkululeko Mlaba (SA) made her WODI debut.

=== 2nd WODI ===
23 January 2021
10:00
Scorecard

South Africa; 252/7 (50 overs)	v	Pakistan; 239/8 (50 overs)
Marizanne Kapp 68* (45); Diana Baig 2/43 (9 overs)		Aliya Riaz 81 (95); Ayabonga Khaka 4/40 (10 overs)

South Africa Women won by 13 runs
Kingsmead, Durban
Umpires: Lauren Agenbag (SA) and Brad White (SA)
Player of the match: Marizanne Kapp (SA)

- Pakistan Women won the toss and elected to field.
- Shabnim Ismail (SA) played in her 100th WODI.

=== 3rd WODI ===
26 January 2021
10:00
Scorecard

South Africa; 201/9 (50 overs)	v	Pakistan; 169 (48 overs)
Laura Wolvaardt 58 (72); Diana Baig 4/30 (10 overs)		Javeria Khan 33 (61); Shabnim Ismail 3/22 (9 overs)

South Africa Women won by 32 runs
Kingsmead, Durban
Umpires: Lauren Agenbag (SA) and Lubabalo Gcuma (SA)
Player of the match: Shabnim Ismail (SA)

- Pakistan Women won the toss and elected to field.
- Tazmin Brits (SA) made her WODI debut.
- Suné Luus (SA) took her 100th wicket becoming the tenth cricketer to score 1,000 runs and take 100 wickets in WODIs.

== WT20I series ==
=== 1st WT20I ===
29 January 2021
15:30 (D/N)
Scorecard

Pakistan; 124/8 (20 overs)	v	South Africa; 125/2 (19 overs)
Ayesha Naseem 31 (25); Marizanne Kapp 3/24 (4 overs)		Tazmin Brits 52* (54); Aiman Anwer 2/29 (4 overs)

South Africa Women won by 8 wickets
Kingsmead, Durban
Umpires: Lubabalo Gcuma (SA) and Stephen Harris (SA)
Player of the match: Tazmin Brits (SA)

- Pakistan Women won the toss and elected to bat.
- Shabnim Ismail (SA) took her 100th wicket in WT20Is.

=== 2nd WT20I ===
31 January 2021
15:30 (D/N)
Scorecard

South Africa; 133/5 (20 overs)	v	Pakistan; 115/7 (20 overs)
Tazmin Brits 66 (58); Anam Amin 2/21 (4 overs)		Aliya Riaz 39 (40); Shabnim Ismail 5/12 (4 overs)

South Africa Women won by 18 runs
Kingsmead, Durban
Umpires: Lauren Agenbag (SA) and Brad White (SA)
Player of the match: Shabnim Ismail (SA)

- Pakistan Women won the toss and elected to field.
- Shabnim Ismail (SA) took her second five-wicket haul in WT20Is.

=== 3rd WT20I ===
3 February 2021
15:30 (D/N)
Scorecard

Pakistan; 127/6 (20 overs)	v	South Africa; 68/4 (12.3 overs)
Javeria Khan 56* (50); Nondumiso Shangase 3/20 (4 overs)		Mignon du Preez 24* (23); Nida Dar 1/13 (2 overs)

Pakistan Women won by 8 runs (DLS method)
Kingsmead, Durban
Umpires: Lauren Agenbag (SA) and Lubabalo Gcuma (SA)
Player of the match: Javeria Khan (Pak)

- South Africa Women won the toss and elected to field.
- South Africa Women were set a revised target of 77 runs from 12.3 overs due to rain.
