= PCB Challengers =

Pakistani women's cricket team

Personnel
- Captain: Omaima Sohail
- Coach: Azam Khan

Team information
- Colours: Green
- Founded: 2018

History
- ODC wins: 1
- WT20 wins: 2

PCB Challengers are a Pakistani women's cricket team that compete in the Pakistan Women's One Day Cup and the PCB Women's Twenty20 Tournament. The team has no geographical base, instead being made up of some of the best players from across Pakistan. They are captained by Omaima Sohail and coached by Azam Khan. They won the first two editions of the PCB Women's Twenty20 Tournament, and the 2021–22 Women's One Day Cup.

== History ==
PCB Challengers were formed in 2018, ahead of the 2017–18 PCB Triangular One Day Women's Tournament. They were captained by Sidra Ameen. They finished second in the group, winning one of their four matches, progressing to the final. They lost the final to PCB Dynamites by 190 runs. The following season, 2018–19, Challengers, captained by Nida Dar, finished bottom of the group, again winning one of their four matches.

In 2019–20, PCB Challengers also competed in a new competition, the PCB Triangular Twenty20 Women's Tournament. They finished top of the group stage of the T20 tournament, and then went on to beat PCB Blasters in the final by 6 wickets to claim their first title. Challengers batter Muneeba Ali was the leading run-scorer in the competition. In the one-day competition, Challengers topped the group stage, with three wins from four matches, but lost to Blasters in the final.

In 2020–21, only the T20 tournament was played. PCB Challengers finished top of the group, winning two of their four matches, with two abandoned. They then beat PCB Dynamites in the final by 7 runs to claim their second T20 title in two years. In 2021–22 the side competed in the newly renamed Pakistan Women's One Day Cup, captained by Javeria Khan. Challengers won five of their six matches in the group stage to top the group, qualifying for the final where they beat PCB Blasters by 68 runs to claim their first one-day title. In 2022–23, they finished bottom of the group in the Women's Twenty20 Tournament, with one victory.

== Players ==
=== Current squad ===
Based on squad for the 2022–23 season. Players in bold have international caps.

| Name | Nationality | Birth date | Batting style | Bowling style | Notes |
Batters
| **Ayesha Zafar** | Pakistan | 9 September 1994 (age 31) | Right-handed | Right-arm leg break | |
| Khadija Chishty | Pakistan | 18 August 1995 (age 30) | Left-handed | Right-arm off break | |
| **Nahida Khan** | Pakistan | 3 November 1986 (age 38) | Right-handed | Right-arm medium-fast | |
All-rounders
| **Aliya Riaz** | Pakistan | 24 September 1992 (age 33) | Right-handed | Right-arm off break | |
| Dua Majid | Pakistan | 21 October 2003 (age 21) | Right-handed | Right-arm medium-fast | |
| **Javeria Khan** | Pakistan | 14 May 1988 (age 37) | Right-handed | Right-arm off break | |
| Noreen Yaqub | Pakistan | 11 August 1997 (age 28) | Right-handed | Right-arm off break | |
| **Omaima Sohail** | Pakistan | 11 July 1997 (age 28) | Right-handed | Right-arm off break | Captain |
Wicket-keepers
| Najiha Alvi | Pakistan | 9 December 2002 (age 22) | Right-handed | – | |
Bowlers
| **Aiman Anwer** | Pakistan | 14 September 1991 (age 34) | Right-handed | Right-arm medium | |
| Anoosha Nasir | Pakistan | 14 August 2005 (age 20) | Right-handed | Slow left-arm orthodox | |
| **Ghulam Fatima** | Pakistan | 1 November 1996 (age 28) | Right-handed | Right-arm off break | |
| Humna Bilal | Pakistan | 10 October 2002 (age 22) | Right-handed | Right-arm medium | |
| Lubna Behram | Pakistan | Unknown | Right-handed | Right-arm medium | |
| **Rameen Shamim** | Pakistan | 19 January 1996 (age 29) | Left-handed | Right-arm off break | |
| Rida Aslam | Pakistan | 29 June 2005 (age 20) | Right-handed | Slow left-arm unorthodox | |

== Seasons ==
=== Pakistan Women's One Day Cup ===
| Season | League standings | | | | | | | | Notes |
| Season | P | W | L | T | A/C | Pts | NRR | Pos | Notes |
|---|---|---|---|---|---|---|---|---|---|
| 2017–18 | 4 | 1 | 2 | 0 | 1 | 3 | –0.593 | 2nd | Lost final |
| 2018–19 | 4 | 1 | 3 | 0 | 0 | 2 | –0.310 | 3rd | |
| 2019–20 | 4 | 3 | 1 | 0 | 0 | 6 | +0.634 | 1st | Lost final |
| 2021–22 | 6 | 5 | 1 | 0 | 0 | 10 | +1.200 | 1st | Champions |

=== PCB Women's Twenty20 Tournament ===
| Season | League standings | | | | | | | | Notes |
| Season | P | W | L | T | A/C | Pts | NRR | Pos | Notes |
|---|---|---|---|---|---|---|---|---|---|
| 2019–20 | 4 | 2 | 2 | 0 | 0 | 4 | +0.600 | 1st | Champions |
| 2020–21 | 4 | 2 | 0 | 0 | 2 | 6 | +0.288 | 1st | Champions |
| 2022–23 | 3 | 1 | 2 | 0 | 0 | 2 | –0.467 | 4th | |

== Honours ==
- Pakistan Women's One Day Cup:
  - Winners (1): 2021–22
- PCB Women's Twenty20 Tournament:
  - Winners (2): 2019–20 & 2020–21
