= Cricket in Pakistan =

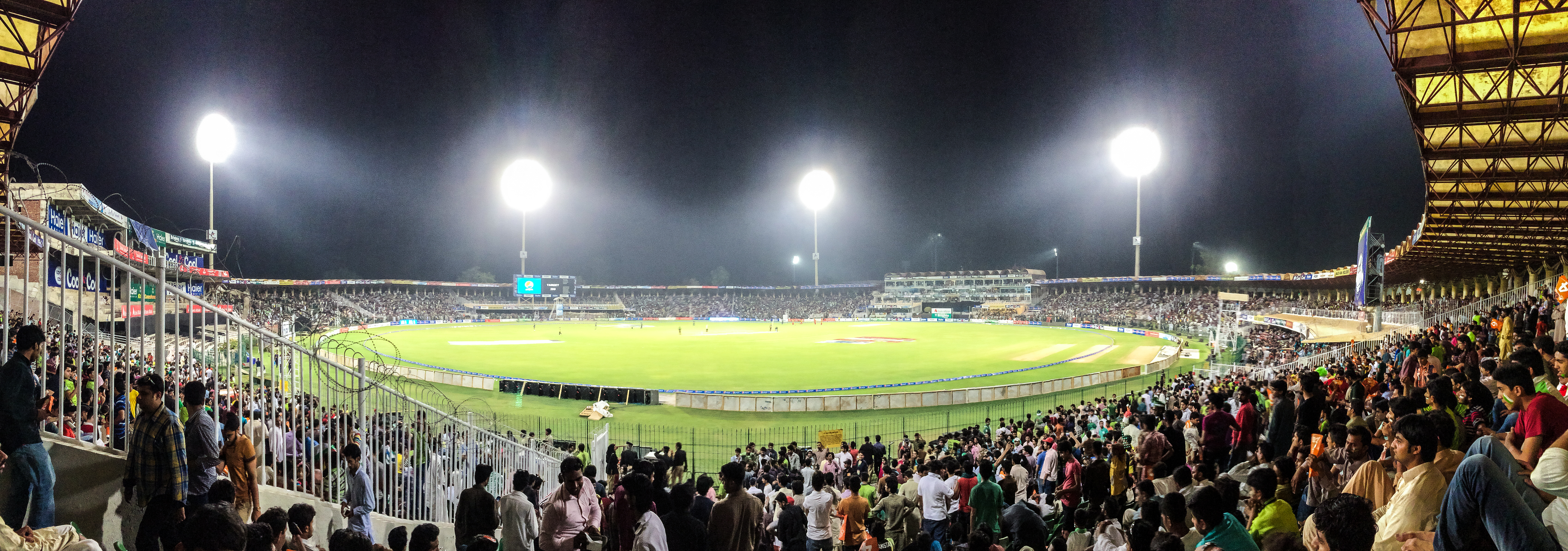
- A panorama of the Gaddafi Stadium at night
- Country: Pakistan
- Governing body: PCB
- National teams: Pakistan Men; Pakistan Women; Pakistan U-19 Men; Pakistan U-19 Women; Pakistan A

National competitions
- List: First Class Cricket; Quaid-e-Azam Trophy; Champions Pentagular; President's Trophy; List A Cricket; Pakistan Cup; Champions One-Day Cup; President's Cup (cricket); Pakistan Women's One Day Cup; T20 Cricket; National T20 Cup; Champions T20 Cup; PCB Women's Twenty20 Tournament

Club competitions
- List: Pakistan Super League

International competitions
- List: Men’s national team; ICC World Test Championship; ICC Cricket World Cup: Champions (1992); ICC Men's T20 World Cup: Champions (2009); ICC Champions Trophy: Champions (2017); Asia Cup: Champions (2000, 2012); Commonwealth Games: Group Stage (1998); Asian Games: 4th (2022); Men’s U-19 national team; ICC Under-19 Cricket World Cup: Champions (2004, 2006); ACC Under-19 Asia Cup: Champions (2012); Pakistan A cricket team; ACC Emerging Teams Asia Cup: Champions (2019, 2023 ACC Emerging Teams Asia Cup); Women's national team; ICC Women's Cricket World Cup; ICC Women's T20 World Cup; Women's Asia Cup: Runners-up (2012, 2016); Commonwealth Games: Group Stage (2022); Asian Games: Gold Medal (2010, 2014); Women's U-19 national team; Under-19 Women's T20 World Cup: Super 6 (2023); ACC Under-19 Women's T20 Asia Cup: Group Stage (2024)

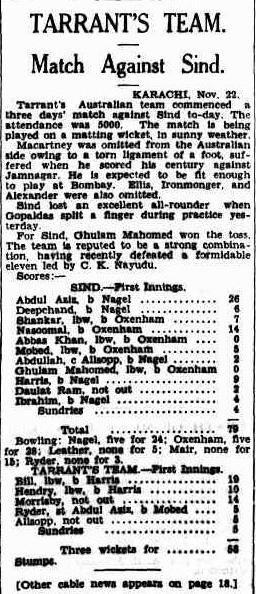
Figure 1: the match between Sind and an Australian XI in Karachi on November 22, 1935, was reported by the Sydney Morning Herald.

The history of cricket in Pakistan predates the creation of the country in 1947. The first international cricket match in what is now Pakistan today was held in Karachi on 22 November 1935 between Sindh and an Australian XI (see Figure 1). The match was seen by 5,000 Karachiites. Cricket was introduced by the British during their colonial rule of British India, which covered the area now known as Pakistan. Cricket is the most popular sport in the country. The Pakistan Cricket Board controls all domestic cricket in Pakistan and the national teams. Pakistan is an official member of the International Cricket Council and the Asian Cricket Council. Regarded as one of the best and most passionate cricketing nations, Pakistan has won the Cricket World Cup in 1992, ICC T20 World Cup in 2009, the ICC Champions Trophy in 2017, the ICC Under-19 Cricket World Cup in 2004 and 2006, the ACC Asia Cup in 2000 and 2012. Pakistan were runner ups in the 1999 Cricket World Cup and 2007 and 2022 T20 World Cups. Pakistan have also been runner ups in several Asia Cup editions. Pakistan cricket team is widely considered an unpredictable team which can outperform opposition on any given day.

== History ==
Professional cricket has been played in Pakistan since its formation in 1947. Cricket in Pakistan has a history predating the creation of the country in 1947. The first ever international cricket match in Karachi was held on 22 November 1935 between Sindh and an Australian XI. The match was seen by 5,000 Karachiites. Ghulam Mohammad was the captain of team Sind and Frank Tarrant was the captain of Tarrant's team. Following the independence of Pakistan in 1947, cricket in the country developed rapidly and Pakistan was given Test match status at a meeting of the Imperial Cricket Conference at Lord's in England on 28 July 1952 following recommendation by India, which, being the successor state of the British Raj, did not have to go through such a process. The first captain of the Pakistan national cricket team was Abdul Hafeez Kardar.

Pakistan's first Test match was played in Delhi in October 1952 as part of a five Test series which India won 2–1. Pakistan made their first tour of England in 1954 and drew the series 1–1 after a victory at The Oval in which fast bowler Fazal Mahmood took 12 wickets. Pakistan's first home Test match was against India in January 1955 at Bangabandhu National Stadium, Dacca, East Pakistan (now Bangladesh), after which four more Test matches were played in Bahawalpur, Lahore, Peshawar and Karachi (all five matches in the series were drawn, the first such occurrence in Test history).

The team is considered a strong but unpredictable team. Traditionally Pakistani cricket has been composed of talented players but is alleged to display limited discipline on occasion, making their performance inconsistent at times. In particular, the India-Pakistan cricket rivalry is usually emotionally charged and can provide for intriguing contests, as talented teams and players from both sides of the border seek to elevate their game to new levels. Pakistan team contests with India in the Cricket World Cup have resulted in packed stadiums and highly charged atmospheres. The team is well supported at home and abroad, especially in the United Kingdom where British Pakistanis have formed a fan-club called the "Stani Army". Members of the club show up to matches across the country and are known to provide raucous support. The Stani Army also takes part in charity initiatives for underprivileged Pakistanis, including annual friendly cricket matches against British Indian members of the similar "Bharat Army".

=== 1947 to 1970 ===
The independent state of Pakistan was established in 1947 following the Partition of India. First-class cricket was already established in the country as many clubs and local associations had previously been part of the Indian cricket scene.Matches were played on an ad hoc basis in the 1947–48 and 1948–49 seasons before Pakistan's Board of Cricket Control (BCCP) was established on 1 May 1949. Games continued to be few and far between for several seasons until a national championship began in 1953.

On 27–29 December 1947, the Punjab v Sind match at Lahore marked the start of first-class cricket in Pakistan as an independent country. Later that season, on 6–8 February 1948, the Punjab Governor's XI v Punjab University match took place, also at Lahore. These were the only matches that season owing to disruption caused by the Partition.Another Punjab Governor's XI v Punjab University took place at Lahore in March 1949, but it was the only domestic first-class match in the second season.The highlight of the 1948–49 season was the arrival of the West Indies team in November 1948. This was the first tour of Pakistan by an overseas team.The Pakistan national cricket team made its inaugural overseas tour in April 1949 with a visit to Ceylon, where the team played two matches against Ceylon in Colombo. Pakistan, captained by Mohammed Saeed, won the first match by an innings and the second by 10 wickets.There were no domestic matches at all in 1949–50 when two touring teams arrived. The first tour was by a Commonwealth XI in November and December 1949. Then Ceylon, on a return tour in March–April 1950, played five first-class matches.

In October to December 1952, Pakistan's Test debut was a five-match series in India, the matches played at New Delhi, Lucknow, Bombay, Madras and Calcutta. After India had won the First Test by an innings, Pakistan won the Second Test by an innings thanks to Fazal Mahmood who took 5–52 and 7–42. India won the Third Test and the other two were drawn.The Qaid-i-Azam Trophy was launched in the 1953–54 season as Pakistan's national championship. The first winner was Bahawalpur. The outstanding player in the inaugural season was the great opening batsman Hanif Mohammad who scored 513 runs at an average of 128.25 with a highest score of 174.In the first international tour of Pakistan by an overseas team, West Indies played two first-class matches versus Sind at Karachi and a Pakistan XI at Lahore. Both matches were drawn.The West Indies team included George Headley, Clyde Walcott and Everton Weekes.The tourists played two matches against an All-Pakistan XI in Lahore and against a Karachi-Sind Combined XI in Karachi. The tourists won the first match by an innings and 177 runs; they won the second match by 6 wickets. Captained by Jock Livingston, who also kept wicket in some games, the team had several well-known players including Frank Worrell, George Tribe, Bill Alley, Cec Pepper, George Dawkes and George Pope.An International XI of county cricketers, most of them English, toured Africa and Asia from January to April 1968, playing one first-class match in Pakistan against a BCCP XI in February, which the International XI won. This was the first ever series win by New Zealand after almost 40 years and 30 consecutive winless series.

=== 1971 to 1985 ===
In 1970, the Ayub Trophy was rebranded as the BCCP Trophy and converted from a knockout tournament to a mini-league format whereby teams qualified for a semi-final stage by winning one of four qualifying groups. The competition's name changed again in 1973 to BCCP Patron's Trophy.The Pentangular Trophy commenced in the 1973–74 season and the Wills Cup, Pakistan's premier limited overs competition, in 1980–81.Australia also played three first-class matches against BCCP Patron's XI at the Pindi Club Ground, Rawalpindi; BCCP XI at the Ibn-e-Qasim Bagh Stadium, Multan; and Pakistan Invitation XI at the Jinnah Stadium, Sialkot. Australia won the first two matches and drew the third.

=== 1986 to 2000 ===
Pakistan won the 1992 Cricket World Cup, beating England by 22 runs in the final at the Melbourne Cricket Ground on 25 March 1992.

Notable Pakistan players in this period include Javed Miandad, Imran Khan, Inzamam-ul-Haq, Mushtaq Ahmed, Waqar Younis, Wasim Akram and Saqlain Mushtaq.

=== 2001 to present ===
Pakistan's cricket faced a major setback in March 2009, when the Sri Lankan team was attacked in Lahore, leading to a suspension of international cricket tours in the country for nearly a decade. During this period, Pakistan hosted its international fixtures primarily in the United Arab Emirates (UAE), using venues in Dubai, Sharjah, and Abu Dhabi as neutral grounds.

Efforts to revive international cricket began gradually, with the Zimbabwe team's tour in 2015 marking the first major return of a Test nation to Pakistan since 2009. This was followed by visits from the ICC World XI (2017), Sri Lanka (2019), South Africa (2021), and Australia (2022), culminating in the full restoration of home cricket. By the mid-2020s, Pakistan had fully restored its status as a regular host of international cricket, staging the 2023 Asia Cup and the 2025 ICC Champions Trophy, and hosting bilateral tours by nearly all ICC full-member nations.

Notable Pakistan players in the 21st century include Inzamam-ul-Haq, Younis Khan, Mohammad Yousuf, Abdul Razzaq (cricketer), Saeed Ajmal, Shahid Afridi, Shoaib Akhtar, Umar Gul, Misbah-ul-Haq and Babar Azam.

== Administration ==
The Pakistan Cricket Board governs all official domestic tournaments. Pakistan is also an official member of the International Cricket Council and the Asian Cricket Council. Almost all cities and villages in Pakistan have their own cricket teams and unofficial tournaments. Pakistani children start playing cricket at a young age.

The game is the most popular sport in the country with the tape ball variety of the game being the most common. A tape ball is a tennis ball wrapped in electrical tape and is used in playing backyard cricket. This modification of the tennis ball gives it greater weight, speed and distance while still being easier to play with than the conventional cricket ball. The variation was pioneered in Karachi, Pakistan and is credited with Pakistan's famous production of fast bowlers as children are brought up playing the game using a tape ball in which various skills are developed. The increasing popularity of the tape ball in informal, local cricket has transformed the way games are played in cricket-loving nations such as India, Sri Lanka, and Bangladesh but most famously Pakistan. Such has been the impact of tape ball that in recent years some companies have introduced tennis balls designed to act like cricket balls. These balls are quite popular in South Asia where tape ball cricket is one of the most popular forms of the sport.

== National teams ==
National teams of Pakistan
- Pakistan (Men's): Pakistan (Women's)
- Pakistan U-19 (Men's): Pakistan U-19 (Women's)
- Pakistan A Men: Pakistan A Women

The Pakistan national cricket team is governed by the Pakistan Cricket Board (PCB) and is a member of the Asian Cricket Council (ACC). Since 1952, the PCB has been affiliated with ICC, the international governing body for world cricket. In 1983, the PCB became one of the founding members of the ACC.

=== Performance ===
The following list includes the performance of all of Pakistan's national teams at major competitions.

==== Men's senior team ====
Tournament	Appearance in finals	Last appearance	Best performance
ICC Men's Cricket World Cup	2 out of 13	2023	Champions (1992)
ICC Men's T20 World Cup	3 out of 9	2024	Champions (2009)
ICC Champions Trophy	1 out of 8	2017	Champions (2017)
ICC World Test Championship	0 out of 3	2023–25	6th (2019–21)
Asia Cup	5 out of 16	2023	Champions (2000, 2012)
Commonwealth Games	0 out of 1	1998	Group Stage (1998)
Asian Games	0 out of 3	2022	4th (2022)

==== Women's senior team ====
Tournament	Appearance in finals	Last appearance	Best performance
ICC Women's Cricket World Cup	0 out of 12	2022	5th (2009)
ICC Women's T20 World Cup	0 out of 9	2024	1st round (2009, 2010, 2012, 2014, 2016, 2018, 2020, 2023)
Women's Asia Cup	2 out of 9	2024	Runners-up (2012, 2016)
Commonwealth Games	0 out of 1	2022	Group Stage (2022)
Asian Games	2 out of 3	2022	Gold Medal (2010, 2014)

==== Men A team ====
Tournament	Appearance in finals	Last appearance	Best performance
ACC Emerging Teams Asia Cup	4 out of 6	2024	Champions (2019, 2023 ACC Emerging Teams Asia Cup)

==== Women's A team ====
Tournament	Finals appearance	Last appearance	Best performance
ACC Women's T20 Emerging Teams Asia Cup	0 out of 1	2023	Semi-final (2023)

==== Men's U-19 team ====
Tournament	Appearance in finals	Last appearance	Best performance
ICC Under-19 Cricket World Cup	5 out of 15	2024	Champions (2004, 2006)
ACC Under-19 Asia Cup	3 out of 11	2024	Champions (2012)

==== Women's U-19 team ====
Tournament	Appearance in finals	Last appearance	Best performance
Under-19 Women's T20 World Cup	0 out of 1	2023	Round 2 (2023)
Under-19 Women's T20 Asia Cup	0 out of 1	2024	Group stage (2024)

== Organisation of cricket in modern Pakistan ==
=== International cricket ===
==== Men's national team ====
Cricket is considered the most popular sport in Pakistan. After the partition of India in 1947 and the formation of Pakistan, Pakistan played its first official match in 1952 under the captaincy of Abdul Kardar against the republic of India in 1952 registering their first Test victory in Lucknow. Women's cricket developed later in Pakistan with the women's national team playing their first match in 1997.

The national cricket team of Pakistan is governed by the Pakistan Cricket Board (PCB) - a permanent member of the International Cricket Council (ICC). Pakistan national teams regularly participate in international home and away series. In addition, the Pakistan men's national team participates in the following major international tournaments:

- ICC ODI Cricket World Cup (ODI): Inaugural Tournament and Debut in 1975
- ICC T20 Cricket World Cup (T20I): Inaugural Tournament and Debut in 2007
- ACC Asia Cup (ODI & T20I): Inaugural Tournament and Debut in 1984
- ICC Champions Trophy (ODI): Inaugural Tournament and Debut in 1998
- ICC World Test Championship (Test): Inaugural Tournament and Debut in 2019/21
- ICC Test Championship (Test): Inauguration and Debut in 2003
- South Africa-Pakistan cricket rivalry

Pakistan men's national team has had success on the international stage having a best international ranking of 1st in the Test, ODI and T20I cricket. In terms of tournament success:

- ICC ODI Cricket World Cup: Champions in 1992
- ICC T20 Cricket World Cup: Champions in 2009
- ICC Champions Trophy: Champions in 2017
- ACC Asia Cup: Champions in 2000 & 2012
- ICC World Test Championship: N/A
- ICC Test Championship: Mace Holders in 2016

From 2009 to 2019 Pakistan was unable to host international matches in Pakistan after the terror attack on the touring Sri Lanka cricket team. This decade led to little or no international cricket taking place in Pakistan and Pakistan played its home series in the UAE (specifically Dubai and Abu Dhabi). As the security situation improved, in September 2019, international test cricket returned to Pakistan with the visit of Sri Lanka. By the end of 2022, almost all the leading Test playing nations had toured the country again, the 2025 ICC Champions Trophy is scheduled to be held in Pakistan.

==== Women's national team ====
The Pakistan women's national cricket team has had moderate success on the international stage and is in development. However, the team is regularly ranked in the top 10 in the world. Thus far the women's national team has not won an ICC or ACC international tournament.

=== Domestic cricket ===
The structure of domestic cricket in Pakistan at the highest level has changed many times since 1947 with the latest restructure being in 2019. Previously domestic cricket operated with departmental, city and regional teams - a set up encouraged by Abdul Hafeez Kardar. Since 1947, the domestic first class cricket system has varied considerably per year with teams ranging from 7 to 26 and tournament matches operating under different formats (often changes occurred every year). With the advent of domestic List A and T20 forms of cricket in the 1970s and 2000s, there has been no consistent set up (as has been noted for first class cricket in Pakistan). Historically, school and club cricket has also suffered due to inconsistencies in top tier domestic cricket. The consistent changes in the domestic structure and the gradual introduction of departmental teams was encouraged as it provided permanent jobs to players. Matches were rarely televised due to lack of quality cricket and lack of interest in departmental cricket. This inconsistent system was widely criticised on the basis of low quality cricket and reduced competition.

In 2019, six regional teams were created on provincial lines. The teams would compete in the principal competitions in all three forms of the game: the Quaid-e-Azam Trophy (First Class), Pakistan Cup (List A) and National T20 Cup (Domestic T20). The PCB's rationale in reducing the number of teams in domestic cricket was to concentrate talent in order to increase competition and improve the quality of cricket. The new structure also consisted of corresponding second XI, under-19, under-16 and under-13 competitions, and live television coverage of top level matches. The restructuring also reorganised district level cricket into a three tier bottom-up system, with 90 city cricket associations supervising school and club cricket at grassroots level, and inter-city tournaments providing a stepping-stone to the six elite regional teams. AFP Sport examines three areas where Babar Azam’s side is struggling The three tier bottom-up system can be summarised as follows

The six regional teams (operated by respective six cricket associations) ensure that the affairs of the associations at city level are regulated. They frame policies that will develop cricket at the grassroots, manage club cricket in collaboration with the 90 city associations and also oversee intra-city competitions. The teams are responsible for revenue generation through sponsorship, marketing and strategic collaborations with business conglomerates. Each of the six regional teams have a chief executive officer and a management committee that has been tasked with supervising all cricketing activities. These changes have been made by the PCB in order to decentralise the administrative body so that it can limit itself to a supervisory role by delegating responsibilities related to the development of the sport to the provincial associations. This tiered structure has been enshrined in the PCB constitution.

An nationwide inter-city franchise T20 tournament, the Pakistan Super League, was inaugurated in 2016. In 2021, a franchise T20 tournament based in Kashmir was launched, titled the Kashmir Premier League.

==== Men's domestic cricket ====
===== First-class competition =====
- Quaid-e-Azam Trophy
- Champions Pentagular
- President's Trophy

===== Limited overs competitions =====
- Pakistan Cup
- Champions One-Day Cup
- President's Cup

===== Twenty20 competitions =====
- Pakistan Super League
- National T20 Cup
- Champions T20 Cup

==== Women's domestic cricket ====
===== Limited overs competitions =====
- Pakistan Women's One Day Cup

===== Twenty20 competitions =====
- PCB Women's Twenty20 Tournament

== Stadiums ==
Pakistan is home to several cricket stadiums, with the major cricket stadiums by province or territory being as follows:

Name of the stadium	Image	Location	Capacity	First match	Latest match					
Name of the stadium	Image	Location	Capacity	First match	Latest match	Gaddafi Stadium	Lahore	36,000	21 November 1959	27 April 2024
Multan Cricket Stadium		Multan	35,000	29 August 2001	20 September 2024					
National Bank Cricket Arena		Karachi	34,328	26 February 1955	3 May 2024					
Rawalpindi Cricket Stadium		Rawalpindi	20,000	9 December 1993	28 October 2024					
Southend Club Cricket Stadium		Karachi	10,000	1 December 1993	28 May 2022					

== International competitions hosted ==
Competition	Edition	Winner	Final	Runners-up	Pakistan's position	Venues	Final venue	Stadium
Men's senior competitions
ICC Men's Cricket World Cup	1987 Cricket World Cup	Australia	253/5 (50 overs) – 246/8 (50 overs)	England	Semi-finals	21 (in 2 countries)	Eden Gardens	
ICC Men's Cricket World Cup	1996 Cricket World Cup	Sri Lanka	241/7 (50 overs) – 245/3 (46.2 overs)	Australia	Semi-finals	26 ( in 3 countries)	Gaddafi Stadium	
Asia Cup	2008 Asia Cup	Sri Lanka	273 (49.5 overs) – 173 (39.3 overs)	India	Super Fours	2 (in 2 cities)	National Stadium	
Asia Cup	2023 Asia Cup	India	50 (15.2 overs) – 51/0 (6.1 overs)	Sri Lanka	Super Fours	4 (in 2 countries)	R. Premadasa Stadium	
ICC Champions Trophy	2025 ICC Champions Trophy	India	251/7 (50 overs) - 254/6 (49 overs)	New Zealand	Group Stage	4 (in 2 countries)	Dubai International Cricket Stadium	File:Dubai Stadium 2019.jpg
Women's senior competitions
Women's Asia Cup	2005–06 Women's Asia Cup	India	269/4 (50 overs) – 172/9 (50 overs)	Sri Lanka	Group Stage	2 (in 1 city)	National Stadium	

== Performance in international competitions ==
A red box around the year indicates tournaments played within Pakistan

Key
Champions
Runners-up
Semi-finals

=== Men's team ===
==== ICC World Test Championship ====
ICC World Test Championship record
Year	League stage										Final Host	Final	Final Position
Year	Pos	Matches					Ded	PC	Pts	PCT	Final Host	Final	Final Position
Year	Pos	P	W	L	D	T	Ded	PC	Pts	PCT	Final Host	Final	Final Position
2019/21	6/9	12	4	5	3	0	0	660	286	43.3	Rose Bowl, Southampton	DNQ	6th
2021/23	7/9	14	4	6	4	0	0	168	64	38.09	The Oval, London	DNQ	7th

==== ICC Cricket World Cup ====
World Cup record
Year	Round	Position	GP	W	L	T	NR	Squad
(England) 1975	Group Stage	5/8	3	1	2	0	0	Squad
(England) 1979	Semi-finals	3/8	4	2	2	0	0	Squad
(England) (Wales) 1983	Semi-finals	4/8	7	3	4	0	0	Squad
(India) (Pakistan) 1987	Semi-finals	4/8	7	5	2	0	0	Squad
(Australia) (New Zealand) 1992	Champions	1/9	10	6	3	0	1	Squad
(India) (Pakistan) (Sri Lanka) 1996	Quarter-finals	6/12	6	4	2	0	0	Squad
(England) (Wales) (Scotland) (Netherlands) (Republic of Ireland) 1999	Runners-up	2/12	10	6	4	0	0	Squad
(South Africa) (Zimbabwe) (Kenya) 2003	Group Stage	10/14	6	2	3	0	1	Squad
(Cricket West Indies) 2007	Group Stage	10/16	3	1	2	0	0	Squad
(India) (Sri Lanka) (Bangladesh) 2011	Semi-finals	3/14	8	6	2	0	0	Squad
(Australia) (New Zealand) 2015	Quarter-finals	6/14	7	4	3	0	0	Squad
(England) (Wales) 2019	Group Stage	5/10	9	5	3	0	1	Squad
(India) 2023	Group Stage	5/10	9	4	5	0	0	Squad
(South Africa) (Zimbabwe) (Namibia) 2027	TBA							
(India) (Bangladesh) 2031	TBA							
Total	13/13	1 Title	89	49	37	0	3	

==== ICC T20 World Cup ====
T20 World Cup record
Year	Round	Position	GP	W	L	T	NR	Squad
(South Africa) 2007	Runners-up	2/12	7	5	1	1	0	Squad
(England) 2009	Champions	1/12	7	5	2	0	0	Squad
(Cricket West Indies) 2010	Semi-finals	4/12	6	2	4	0	0	Squad
(Sri Lanka) 2012	Semi-finals	4/12	6	4	2	0	0	Squad
(Bangladesh) 2014	Super 10	5/16	4	2	2	0	0	Squad
(India) 2016	Super 10	7/16	4	1	3	0	0	Squad
(United Arab Emirates) (Oman) 2021	Semi-finals	3/16	6	5	1	0	0	Squad
(Australia) 2022	Runners-up	2/16	7	4	3	0	0	Squad
(Cricket West Indies) (United States) 2024	Group Stage	11/20	4	2	1	1	0	Squad
(India) (Sri Lanka) 2026	TBA							
(Australia) (New Zealand) 2028	TBA							
(England) (Wales) (Republic of Ireland) (Scotland) 2030	TBA							
Total	9/9	1 Title	51	30	19	2	0	

==== ICC Champions Trophy ====
Champions Trophy record
Year	Round	Position	GP	W	L	T	NR	Squad
(Bangladesh) 1998	Quarter-finals	5/9	1	0	1	0	0	Squad
(Kenya) 2000	Semi-finals	3/11	2	1	1	0	0	Squad
(Sri Lanka) 2002	Group Stage	5/12	2	1	1	0	0	Squad
(England) 2004	Semi-finals	4/12	3	2	1	0	0	Squad
(India) 2006	Group Stage	8/10	3	1	2	0	0	Squad
(South Africa) 2009	Semi-finals	3/8	4	2	2	0	0	Squad
(England) (Wales) 2013	Group Stage	8/8	3	0	3	0	0	Squad
(England) (Wales) 2017	Champions	1/8	5	4	1	0	0	Squad
(Pakistan) (United Arab Emirates) 2025	Qualified							
(India) 2029	TBA							
Total	8/8	1 Title	23	11	12	0	0	

==== Asia Cup ====
Asia Cup record
Year	Round	Position	GP	W	L	T	NR
(United Arab Emirates) 1984	Group stage	3/3	2	0	2	0	0
(Sri Lanka) 1986	Runners-up	2/3	3	2	1	0	0
(Bangladesh) 1988	Group stage	3/4	3	1	2	0	0
(India) 1990–91	Did not participate						
(United Arab Emirates) 1995	Group Stage	3/4	3	2	1	0	0
(Sri Lanka) 1997	Group Stage	3/4	3	1	1	0	1
(Bangladesh) 2000	Champions	1/4	4	4	0	0	0
(Sri Lanka) 2004	Super Fours	3/6	5	4	1	0	0
(Pakistan) 2008	Super Fours	3/6	5	3	2	0	0
(Sri Lanka) 2010	Group stage	3/4	3	1	2	0	0
(Bangladesh) 2012	Champions	1/4	4	3	1	0	0
(Bangladesh) 2014	Runners-up	2/5	5	3	2	0	0
(Bangladesh) 2016	Group Stage	3/5	4	2	2	0	0
(United Arab Emirates) 2018	Super Fours	3/6	5	2	3	0	0
(United Arab Emirates) 2022	Runners-up	2/6	6	3	3	0	0
(Pakistan) (Sri Lanka) 2023	Super Fours	4/6	5	2	2	0	1
(India) 2025	Qualified						
Total	15/16	2 Titles	60	33	25	0	2

==== Commonwealth Games ====
Commonwealth Games record
Year	Round	Position	P	W	L	T	NR
(Malaysia) 1998	Group stage	7≤/16	3	1	1	0	1
Total	0 Title	-	3	1	1	0	1

==== Asian Games ====
Asian Games record
Year	Round	Position	P	W	L	T	NR
(China) 2010	Bronze Medal	3/9	3	2	1	0	0
(South Korea) 2014	Did Not Participate						
(China) 2022	Bronze Medal Match	4/14	3	1	2	0	0
Total	0 Title	-	6	3	3	0	0

==== Defunct tournaments ====
Other/Defunct Tournaments
Australian Tri-Series	Asian Test Championship	Austral-Asia Cup	NatWest Series	World Championship of Cricket	Nehru Cup
(Australia) 1981–82: Group stage; (Australia) 1983–84: Group stage; (Australia) 1988–89: Group stage; (Australia) 1989–90: Runners-up; (Australia) 1992–93: Group stage; (Australia) 1996–97: Champions; (Australia) 1999–2000: Runners-up; (Australia) 2004–05: Runners-up	(India) (Pakistan) (Sri Lanka) 1999: Champions; (Bangladesh) (Pakistan) (Sri Lanka) 2001: Runners-up	(United Arab Emirates) 1986: Champions; (United Arab Emirates) 1990: Champions; (United Arab Emirates) 1994: Champions	(England) 2001: Runners-up	(Australia) 1985: Runners-up	(India) 1989: Champions

=== Women's team ===
==== ICC Women's Cricket World Cup ====
Women's Cricket World Cup record
Year	Round	Position	GP	W	L	T	NR
(England) 1973	Team did not exist						
(India) 1978	Team did not exist						
(New Zealand) 1982	Team did not exist						
(Australia) 1988	Team did not exist						
(England) 1993	Team did not exist						
(India) 1997	Group Stage	11/11	5	0	5	0	0
(New Zealand) 2000	Did not participate						
(South Africa) 2005	Did not participate						
(Australia) 2009	Super Sixes	5/8	7	2	5	0	0
(India) 2013	Group Stage	8/8	4	0	4	0	0
(England) 2017	Group Stage	8/8	7	0	7	0	0
(New Zealand) 2022	Group Stage	8/8	7	1	6	0	0
Total	5/12	0 Titles	30	3	27	0	0

==== ICC Women's T20 World Cup ====
ICC Women's T20 World Cup record
Year	Round	Position	GP	W	L	T	NR
(England) 2009	Group Stage	8/8	3	0	3	0	0
(Cricket West Indies) 2010	Group Stage	8/8	3	0	3	0	0
(Sri Lanka) 2012	Group Stage	7/8	4	1	3	0	0
(Bangladesh) 2014	Group Stage	8/10	6	2	4	0	0
(India) 2016	Group Stage	6/10	4	2	2	0	0
(Cricket West Indies) 2018	Group Stage	8/10	4	1	3	0	0
(Australia) 2020	Group Stage	7/10	4	1	2	0	1
(South Africa) 2023	Group Stage	8/10	4	1	3	0	0
(United Arab Emirates) 2024	Group Stage	8/10	4	1	3	0	0
(England) 2026	TBA						
(Pakistan) 2028	TBA						
Total	9/9	0 Titles	36	9	26	0	1

==== ICC Women's Championship ====
Women's Championship record
Year	Round	Position	GP	W	L	D	T	NR
2014-16	Group Stage	7/8	21	7	14	0	0	0
2017-20	Group Stage	5/8	21	7	9	1	0	4
2022-25	Group Stage	8/10	24	8	15	0	0	2
Total	0 Title	-	66	22	38	1	0	6

==== ACC Women's Asia Cup ====
Year	Round	Position	GP	W	L	T	NR
(Sri Lanka) 2006	Did not participate						
(Pakistan) 2005–06	Group Stage	3/3	4	0	4	0	0
(India) 2006	Group Stage	3/3	4	0	4	0	0
(Sri Lanka) 2008	Group Stage	3/4	6	1	5	0	0
(China) 2012	Runners-ups	2/8	5	3	2	0	0
(Thailand) 2016	Runners-ups	2/6	6	4	2	0	0
(Malaysia) 2018	Group Stage	3/6	5	3	2	0	0
(Bangladesh) 2022	Semi-finals	3/7	7	5	2	0	0
(Sri Lanka) 2024	Semi-finals	4/8	4	2	2	0	0
Total	8/9	0 Title	41	18	23	0	0

==== Commonwealth Games ====
Commonwealth Games record
Year	Round	Position	GP	W	L	T	NR
(England) 2022	Silver medal	7/8	3	0	3	0	0
Total	0 Title	-	3	0	3	0	0

==== Asian Games ====
Asian Games record
Year	Round	Position	GP	W	L	T	NR
(China) 2010	Champions	1/8	4	4	0	0	0
(South Korea) 2014	Champions	1/10	3	3	0	0	0
(China) 2022	Semi-finals	4/9	3	0	2	0	1
Total	3/3	2 Titles	10	7	2	0	1

=== Men's U-19 team ===
==== U-19 World Cup Record ====
Year	Host	Squad	Result
1988	Australia	Squad	Runners-up
1998	South Africa	Squad	2nd Round
2000	Sri Lanka	Squad	3rd place
2002	New Zealand	Squad	8th place
2004	Bangladesh	Squad	Champions
2006	Sri Lanka	Squad	Champions
2008	Malaysia	Squad	3rd place
2010	New Zealand	Squad	Runners-up
2012	Australia	Squad	8th place
2014	UAE	Squad	Runners-up
2016	Bangladesh	Squad	5th place
2018	New Zealand	Squad	3rd place
2020	South Africa	Squad	3rd place
2022	West Indies	Squad	5th place
2024	South Africa	Squad	3rd place

==== U-19 Asia Cup Record ====
Year	Venue	Round
2012	Pakistan	Champions
2014	United Arab Emirates	Runners-up
2016	Sri Lanka	5th Place
2017	Malaysia	Runners-up
2018	Bangladesh	5th Place
2019	Sri Lanka	6th Place
2021	United Arab Emirates	Semi finalists
2023	United Arab Emirates	Semi finalists

=== Women's U-19 team ===
==== Under-19 Women's World Cup record ====
Pakistan's U19 Twenty20 World Cup Record
Year	Result	Pos	№	Pld	W	L	T	NR
(South Africa) 2023	Super 6	–	16	5	3	2	0	0
(Malaysia) (Thailand) 2025	To be determined							
(Bangladesh) (Nepal) 2027	To be determined							
Total				5	3	2	0	0

==== Under-19 Women's Asia Cup record ====
Pakistan's Under-19 Twenty20 Asia Cup Record
Year	Result	Pos	№	Pld	W	L	T	NR
(Malaysia) 2024	Group stage	5/6	6	3	0	2	0	1
Total				3	0	2	0	1

=== Men's A team ===
==== ACC Emerging Teams Asia Cup ====
ACC Emerging Teams Asia Cup record
Year	Round	Position	P	W	L	T	NR
(Singapore) 2013	Runners-up	2/8	5	3	2	0	0
(Bangladesh) 2017	Runners-up	2/8	5	3	1	1	0
(Sri Lanka) (Pakistan) 2018	Semi-finals	3/8	4	2	2	0	0
(Bangladesh) 2019	Gold Medal	1/8	5	5	0	0	0
(Sri Lanka) 2023	Gold Medal	1/8	5	4	1	0	0
(Oman) 2024	Semi-finals	4/8	4	2	2	0	0
Total	2 Title	-	28	19	8	1	0

=== Women's A team ===
==== ACC Women's T20 Emerging Teams Asia Cup ====
ACC Women's T20 Emerging Teams Asia Cup record
Year	Round	Position	P	W	L	T	NR
(Hong Kong) 2023	Semi-finals	3/8	4	1	1	0	2
Total	0 Title	-	4	1	1	0	2

== See also ==
- Sport in Pakistan
- Cricket in South Asia
- List of cricket records
- List of Pakistan national cricket captains
- List of Pakistan Test cricketers
- List of Pakistan ODI cricketers
- List of Pakistan Twenty20 International cricketers
- List of National Sports Award recipients in cricket
- Pakistan national blind cricket team
