= PCB Blasters =

Pakistani women's cricket team

Personnel
- Captain: Fatima Sana
- Coach: Mohtashim Rasheed

Team information
- Colours: Silver
- Founded: 2018

History
- ODC wins: 1
- WT20 wins: 1

PCB Blasters are a Pakistani women's cricket team that compete in the Pakistan Women's One Day Cup and the PCB Women's Twenty20 Tournament. The team has no geographical base, instead being made up of some of the best players from across Pakistan. They are captained by Fatima Sana and coached by Mohtashim Rasheed. They have won the 2019–20 edition of the Women's One-Day Cup, and the 2022–23 Women's Twenty20 Tournament.

== History ==
PCB Blasters were formed in 2018, ahead of the 2017–18 PCB Triangular One Day Women's Tournament. They were captained by Nahida Khan. They finished bottom of the group, winning one of their four matches. However, Blasters batter Kainat Imtiaz was the leading run-scorer in the competition, and Blaster bowler Ghulam Fatima was the leading wicket-taker. The following season, 2018–19, Blasters, captained by Rameen Shamim, topped the group with three wins from four matches. However, they lost the final to PCB Dynamites by 12 runs. Blasters batter Aliya Riaz was the leading run-scorer in the tournament, whilst Blasters players Diana Baig, Aliya Riaz and Rameen Shamim were three of the five joint leading wicket-takers.

In 2019–20, PCB Blasters also competed in a new competition, the PCB Triangular Twenty20 Women's Tournament. They finished second in the group stage of the T20 tournament, but lost to PCB Challengers in the final by 6 wickets. In the one-day competition, however, Blasters won their first title, again finishing second in the group stage but defeating PCB Challengers in the final, helped by 102* from the tournament's leading run-scorer Sidra Ameen.

In 2020–21, only the T20 tournament was played. PCB Blasters finished bottom of the group, losing three of their four matches, with one abandoned. In 2021–22 the side competed in the newly renamed Pakistan Women's One Day Cup, captained by Sidra Nawaz. The Blasters won five of their six matches in the group stage, qualifying for the final where they lost to PCB Challengers by 68 runs. In 2022–23, the side won their first T20 tournament, beating PCB Dynamites in the final by 7 runs.

== Players ==
=== Current squad ===
Based on squad for the 2022–23 season. Players in bold have international caps.

Name	Nationality	Birth date	Batting style	Bowling style	Notes
Batters
Amber Kainaat	Pakistan	Unknown	Unknown	Unknown	
**Ayesha Naseem**	Pakistan	7 August 2004 (age 21)	Right-handed	Right-arm medium-fast	
Gull Rukh	Pakistan	25 December 2001 (age 23)	Right-handed	Right-arm off break	
**Shawal Zulfiqar**	Pakistan	27 June 2005 (age 20)	Right-handed	–	
**Sidra Ameen**	Pakistan	7 April 1992 (age 33)	Right-handed	Right-arm medium	
All-rounders
Ayesha Bilal	Pakistan	Unknown	Unknown	Unknown	
**Bismah Maroof**	Pakistan	18 July 1991 (age 34)	Left-handed	Right-arm leg break	
**Fatima Sana**	Pakistan	8 November 2001 (age 23)	Right-handed	Right-arm medium-fast	Captain
Huraina Sajjad	Pakistan	26 June 1997 (age 28)	Right-handed	Right-arm off break	
Wicket-keepers
**Fareeha Mehmood**	Pakistan	19 February 1994 (age 31)	Left-handed	–	
Bowlers
Aima Saleem	Pakistan	6 June 2002 (age 23)	Left-handed	Slow left-arm orthodox	
**Anam Amin**	Pakistan	11 August 1992 (age 33)	Left-handed	Slow left-arm orthodox	
Maham Manzoor	Pakistan	18 September 1995 (age 30)	Left-handed	Slow left-arm orthodox	
Mahnoor Aftab	Pakistan	9 December 2005 (age 19)	Right-handed	Right-arm off break	
Syeda Masooma Zahra	Pakistan	31 July 2001 (age 24)	Left-handed	Right-arm medium	

== Seasons ==
=== Pakistan Women's One Day Cup ===
Season	League standings								Notes
Season	P	W	L	T	A/C	Pts	NRR	Pos	Notes
2017–18	4	1	3	0	0	2	+0.012	3rd	
2018–19	4	3	1	0	0	6	+0.085	1st	Lost final
2019–20	4	2	2	0	0	4	–0.098	2nd	Champions
2021–22	6	5	1	0	0	10	+0.431	2nd	Lost final

=== PCB Women's Twenty20 Tournament ===
Season	League standings								Notes
Season	P	W	L	T	A/C	Pts	NRR	Pos	Notes
2019–20	4	2	2	0	0	4	+0.124	2nd	Lost final
2020–21	4	0	3	0	1	1	–0.396	3rd	
2022–23	3	2	1	0	0	4	+0.025	2nd	Champions

== Honours ==
- Pakistan Women's One Day Cup:
  - Winners (1): 2019–20
- PCB Women's Twenty20 Tournament:
  - Winners (1): 2022–23
