= PCB Strikers =

Pakistani women's cricket team

Personnel
- Captain: Muneeba Ali
- Coach: Waqar Orakzai

Team information
- Colours: Yellow
- Founded: 2021

History
- ODC wins: 0
- WT20 wins: 0

PCB Strikers are a Pakistani women's cricket team that compete in the Pakistan Women's One Day Cup and the PCB Women's Twenty20 Tournament. The Strikers have no geographical base, instead being made up of some of the best players from across Pakistan. They are captained by Muneeba Ali and coached by Waqar Orakzai. The side was formed ahead of the 2021–22 Pakistan Women's One Day Cup, adding to the previously three-team competition as a reflection of the growing number of female cricketers in Pakistan.

== History ==
PCB Strikers were formed in 2021 to compete in the Pakistan Women's One Day Cup, expanding the competition from three teams to four, to allow greater opportunities for players to participate. In their first season, they were captained by Kainat Imtiaz and coached by Arshad Khan. In the group stage, they won two matches, both against PCB Dynamites, to finish third. They again beat PCB Dynamites in the third-place play-off.

In 2022–23, they competed in their first PCB Women's Twenty20 Tournament. The side finished third in the group stage, with one victory.

== Players ==
=== Current squad ===
Based on the squad for the 2022–23 season. Players in bold have played internationally for Pakistan.

Name	Nationality	Birth date	Batting style	Bowling style	Notes
Batters
Eyman Fatima	Pakistan	12 October 2004 (age 20)	Right-handed	–	
**Javeria Rauf**	Pakistan	10 April 1989 (age 36)	Right-handed	Right-arm medium	
**Kaynat Hafeez**	Pakistan	17 June 1996 (age 29)	Right-handed	Right-arm off break	
Zunaira Shah	Pakistan	26 October 1996 (age 28)	Right-handed	–	
All-rounders
Ayesha Irfan	Pakistan	Unknown	Right-handed	Right-arm off break	
**Iram Javed**	Pakistan	16 December 1991 (age 33)	Right-handed	Right-arm medium-fast	
Wicket-keepers
**Muneeba Ali**	Pakistan	8 August 1997 (age 28)	Left-handed	–	Captain
Soha Fatima	Pakistan	3 January 1997 (age 28)	Right-handed	–	
Bowlers
Fatima Khan	Pakistan	23 November 2003 (age 21)	Right-handed	Right-arm medium	
**Maham Tariq**	Pakistan	5 July 1997 (age 28)	Right-handed	Right-arm fast-medium	
**Nashra Sandhu**	Pakistan	19 November 1997 (age 27)	Right-handed	Slow left-arm orthodox	
**Natalia Pervaiz**	Pakistan	25 December 1995 (age 29)	Right-handed	Right-arm medium-fast	
Neha Sharmin	Pakistan	Unknown	Right-handed	Left-arm medium	
**Saba Nazir**	Pakistan	1 November 1992 (age 32)	Right-handed	Right-arm off break	
**Syeda Aroob Shah**	Pakistan	31 December 2003 (age 21)	Right-handed	Right-arm leg break	

== Seasons ==
=== Pakistan Women's One Day Cup ===
Season	League standings								Notes
Season	P	W	L	T	A/C	Pts	NRR	Pos	Notes
2021–22	6	2	4	0	0	4	–0.831	3rd	Won Third Place Play-off

=== PCB Women's Twenty20 Tournament ===
Season	League standings								Notes
Season	P	W	L	T	A/C	Pts	NRR	Pos	Notes
2022–23	3	1	2	0	0	2	+0.026	3rd	

== Honours ==
- Pakistan Women's One Day Cup:
  - Winners (0):
  - Best finish: 3rd (2021–22)
- PCB Women's Twenty20 Tournament:
  - Winners (0):
  - Best finish: 3rd (2022–23)
