= Bangladesh women's cricket team in Pakistan in 2019–20 =

International cricket tour

	Pakistan women	Bangladesh
- Dates: 26 October – 4 November 2019
Captains	Bismah Maroof	Rumana Ahmed (WODIs); Salma Khatun (WT20Is)

One Day International series
- Results: 2-match series drawn 1–1
Most runs	Nahida Khan (131)	Fargana Hoque (94)
Most wickets	Sana Mir (4)	Panna Ghosh (3); Rumana Ahmed (3); Jahanara Alam (3); Salma Khatun (3)

Twenty20 International series
- Results: Pakistan women won the 3-match series 3–0
Most runs	Javeria Khan (109)	Sanjida Islam (59)
Most wickets	Anam Amin (5)	Jahanara Alam (9)
- Player of the series: Bismah Maroof (Pak)

The Bangladesh women's cricket team toured Pakistan in October and November 2019 to play Women's One Day Internationals (WODIs) and Women's Twenty20 International (WT20I) series against the Pakistan women's cricket team. The three WODIs and the three WT20I matches were played at the Gaddafi Stadium in Lahore. It was the first time that the Pakistan women's team played at the stadium. The Bangladesh women's team had last toured Pakistan in September and October 2015.

The Bangladesh Cricket Board (BCB) opted not to send their three support staff with Indian nationality, to avoid visa issues amid political tensions between India and Pakistan. Less than two weeks from the start of the tour, the series was thrown into doubt, after the Bangladesh government had not yet given clearance for the team to travel. However, on 21 October 2019, the BCB confirmed the squad for the tour. The following day, the Pakistan Cricket Board (PCB) confirmed the itinerary for the tour.

Pakistan won all three WT20I matches. In the WODI series that was drawn 1-1, Pakistan won the first match by 29 runs, and Bangladesh the second by one wicket.

== Squads ==
WODIs		WT20Is	
Pakistan	Bangladesh	Pakistan	Bangladesh
Bismah Maroof (c); Sidra Ameen; Diana Baig; Kainat Imtiaz; Sadia Iqbal; Iram Javed; Javeria Khan; Nahida Khan; Sana Mir; Sidra Nawaz (wk); Aliya Riaz; Fatima Sana; Nashra Sandhu; Syeda Aroob Shah; Omaima Sohail	Rumana Ahmed (c); Nahida Akter; Sharmin Akhter; Jahanara Alam; Panna Ghosh; Fargana Hoque; Sanjida Islam; Fahima Khatun; Murshida Khatun; Salma Khatun; Khadija Tul Kubra; Sanjida Akter Meghla; Nigar Sultana (wk); Shamima Sultana; Sharmin Sultana	Bismah Maroof (c); Sidra Ameen; Anam Amin; Diana Baig; Kainat Imtiaz; Sadia Iqbal; Iram Javed; Javeria Khan; Nahida Khan; Sana Mir; Saba Nazir; Sidra Nawaz (wk); Aliya Riaz; Omaima Sohail; Ayesha Zafar	Salma Khatun (c); Rumana Ahmed; Sharmin Akhter; Jahanara Alam; Panna Ghosh; Fargana Hoque; Sanjida Islam; Khadija Tul Kubra; Sanjida Akter Meghla; Ekka Mollik; Lata Mondal; Ayasha Rahman; Nigar Sultana; Shamima Sultana (wk); Sharmin Sultana

Labone Akther, Nahida Akter, Happy Alam, Sabinkun Nahar Jesmin, Fahima Khatun, Ritu Moni, Sobhana Mostary and Zinnat Asia Orthi were also named as standby players for Bangladesh.

== WT20I series ==
=== 1st WT20I ===
26 October 2019
13:00
Scorecard

Pakistan; 126/7 (20 overs)	v	Bangladesh; 112/7 (20 overs)
Bismah Maroof 34 (29); Jahanara Alam 4/17 (4 overs)		Rumana Ahmed 50 (30); Anam Amin 2/13 (4 overs)

Pakistan Women won by 14 runs
Gaddafi Stadium, Lahore
Umpires: Tariq Rasheed (Pak) and Asif Yaqoob (Pak)
Player of the match: Bismah Maroof (Pak)

- Pakistan Women won the toss and elected to bat.
- Sadia Iqbal (Pak) made her WT20I debut.

=== 2nd WT20I ===
28 October 2019
10:00
Scorecard

Pakistan; 167/3 (20 overs)	v	Bangladesh; 152/7 (20 overs)
Bismah Maroof 70* (50); Jahanara Alam 2/27 (4 overs)		Sanjida Islam 45 (32); Sadia Iqbal 3/19 (4 overs)

Pakistan Women won by 15 runs
Gaddafi Stadium, Lahore
Umpires: Faisal Afridi (Pak) and Asif Yaqoob (Pak)
Player of the match: Bismah Maroof (Pak)

- Bangladesh Women won the toss and elected to field.

=== 3rd WT20I ===
30 October 2019
10:00
Scorecard

Pakistan; 117/7 (20 overs)	v	Bangladesh; 89/8 (20 overs)
Javeria Khan 54 (48); Jahanara Alam 3/12 (4 overs)		Nigar Sultana 30 (44); Anam Amin 2/10 (4 overs)

Pakistan Women won by 28 runs
Gaddafi Stadium, Lahore
Umpires: Tariq Rasheed (Pak) and Asif Yaqoob (Pak)
Player of the match: Javeria Khan (Pak)

- Pakistan Women won the toss and elected to bat.
- Saba Nazir (Pak) and Sanjida Akter Meghla (Ban) both made their WT20I debuts.

== WODI series ==
=== 1st WODI ===
2 November 2019
09:30
Scorecard

Pakistan; 215 (48.5 overs)	v	Bangladesh; 186 (47.4 overs)
Nahida Khan 68 (97); Jahanara Alam 3/44 (10 overs)		Nigar Sultana 58 (77); Sana Mir 3/49 (10 overs)

Pakistan Women won by 29 runs
Gaddafi Stadium, Lahore
Umpires: Shozab Raza (Pak) and Asif Yaqoob (Pak)
Player of the match: Nahida Khan (Pak)

- Pakistan Women won the toss and elected to bat.
- Sadia Iqbal (Pak) made her WODI debut.

=== 2nd WODI ===
4 November 2019
09:30
Scorecard

Pakistan; 210 (48.4 overs)	v	Bangladesh; 211/9 (49.5 overs)
Nahida Khan 63 (79); Rumana Ahmed 3/35 (8 overs)		Fargana Hoque 67 (97); Bismah Maroof 2/24 (6.5 overs)

Bangladesh Women won by 1 wicket
Gaddafi Stadium, Lahore
Umpires: Shozab Raza (Pak) and Asif Yaqoob (Pak)
Player of the match: Fargana Hoque (Ban)

- Pakistan Women won the toss and elected to bat.
- Syeda Aroob Shah (Pak) made her WODI debut.
- Javeria Khan became the third female cricketer for Pakistan to play in 100 WODIs.
- This was Bangladesh Women's highest successful run chase in WODIs.
