= Pakistani cricket =

Pakistani cricket may refer to one of the following:

- Cricket in Pakistan
- Pakistan national cricket team
- Pakistan national women's cricket team
- Pakistan Cricket Board
