= PCB Women's Twenty20 Tournament =

Pakistan women's Twenty20 cricket competition

- Countries: Pakistan
- Administrator: Pakistan Cricket Board (PCB)
- Format: Twenty20
- First edition: 2019–20
- Latest edition: 2022–23
- Tournament format: Round-robin and final
- Number of teams: 4
- Current champion: PCB Blasters (1st title)
- Most successful: PCB Challengers (2 titles)

The PCB Women's Twenty20 Tournament, previously the National Triangular T20 Women's Cricket Championship, is a women's domestic Twenty20 competition organised by the Pakistan Cricket Board. The tournament first took place in 2019–20, with three teams taking part: PCB Blasters, PCB Challengers and PCB Dynamites. The tournament expanded to four teams in 2022–23, with the addition of PCB Strikers. The competition has run alongside the PCB Triangular One Day Women's Tournament.

PCB Challengers won the first two editions of the competition, defeating PCB Blasters in the 2019–20 final and PCB Dynamites in the 2020–21 final. PCB Blasters won their first title in 2022–23, defeating PCB Dynamites in the final.

== History ==
The PCB Triangular Twenty20 Women's Tournament was established in 2019–20, effectively replacing the Departmental T20 Women's Championship. Three teams, PCB Blasters, PCB Challengers and PCB Dynamites, made up of the best players from across Pakistan, competed in a round-robin group across a week in January 2020 at the National Stadium, Karachi. PCB Challengers won the tournament, beating PCB Blasters by 6 wickets in the final, helped by an unbeaten half-century from captain Bismah Maroof.

In 2020–21 the tournament took place behind closed doors (due to the COVID-19 pandemic) at the Rawalpindi Cricket Stadium in November and December 2020. PCB Challengers again won the competition, beating PCB Dynamites in the final by 7 runs.

In 2022–23 the tournament expanded to four teams, with the addition of PCB Strikers, who formed ahead of the 2021–22 Pakistan Women's One Day Cup. The tournament was preceded by a "first phase", with three teams, PCB Conquerors, PCB Invincibles and PCB Stars, made up of Under-19 and emerging players (with the tournament taking place at the same time as the national side's home series against Ireland). The first phase of the tournament was won by PCB Stars. The second phase of the tournament took place from 1 to 9 December 2022. In the second phase competition, PCB Blasters and PCB Dynamites qualified for the final, with PCB Blasters emerging victorious by 7 runs.

== Teams ==
Team	First	Last	Titles
PCB Blasters	2019–20	2022–23	1
PCB Challengers	2019–20	2022–23	2
PCB Dynamites	2019–20	2022–23	0
PCB Strikers	2022–23	2022–23	0

== Results ==
Season	1st	2nd	3rd	4th	Leading run-scorer	Leading wicket-taker	Ref
2019–20	PCB Challengers	PCB Blasters	PCB Dynamites	–	Muneeba Ali (Challengers) 292	Anam Amin (Blasters) 7	
2020–21	PCB Challengers	PCB Dynamites	PCB Blasters	–	Nahida Khan (Dynamites) 154	Hafsa Amjad (Blasters); Fatima Sana (Challengers); Nashra Sandhu (Dynamites) 4	
2022–23	PCB Blasters	PCB Dynamites	PCB Strikers	PCB Challengers	Bismah Maroof (Blasters) 192	Fatima Sana (Blasters) 6	

== See also ==
- Pakistan Women's One Day Cup
- National T20 Cup
