= Sadia Iqbal =

Pakistani cricketer (born 1995)

Personal information
- Full name: Sadia Iqbal
- Born: 5 August 1995 (age 31); Faisalabad, Punjab, Pakistan
- Batting: Left-handed
- Bowling: Slow left-arm orthodox
- Role: Bowler

International information
- National side: Pakistan
- ODI debut (cap 80): 2 November 2019 v Bangladesh
- Last ODI: 18 December 2023 v New Zealand
- T20I debut (cap 45): 26 October 2019 v Bangladesh
- Last T20I: 9 December 2023 v New Zealand
- T20I shirt no.: 45

Domestic team information
- Years: Team
- 2011/12–2017: Faisalabad
- 2015: Higher Education Commission

Career statistics
Competition	WODI	WT20I	WLA	WT20
Matches	20	28	45	17
Runs scored	20	6	116	9
Batting average	3.33	3.00	5.52	3.00
100s/50s	0/0	0/0	0/0	0/0
Top score	7	4*	35	8*
Balls bowled	1029	661	2,146	366
Wickets	23	29	42	11
Bowling average	27.08	20.86	27.76	34.90
5 wickets in innings	0	0	1	0
10 wickets in match	0	0	0	0
Best bowling	4/13	3/19	5/14	3/19
Catches/stumpings	3/–	5/–	5/–	2/–
- Source: CricketArchive, 29 December 2023

Sadia Iqbal (born 5 August 1995) is a Pakistani cricketer who plays as a slow left-arm orthodox bowler. In October 2019, she was named in Pakistan's squad for their series against Bangladesh. She made her Women's Twenty20 International (WT20I) debut for Pakistan, against Bangladesh, on 26 October 2019. She made her Women's One Day International (WODI) debut for Pakistan, also against Bangladesh, on 2 November 2019. She is the world number 1 in the T20I bowling rankings as of 16 March 2026.

== International career ==
In January 2020, she was named in Pakistan's squad for the 2020 ICC Women's T20 World Cup in Australia. In October 2021, she was named in Pakistan's team for the 2021 Women's Cricket World Cup Qualifier tournament in Zimbabwe. In May 2022, she was named in Pakistan's team for the cricket tournament at the 2022 Commonwealth Games in Birmingham, England.

In December 2022, She was named in the Pakistan squad for the 2023 Women's T20 World Cup. In December 2023, she bowled a Super Over in the 3rd ODI against New Zealand and Pakistan won the match One-over Eliminator and was the first win against New Zealand in New Zealand in women's ODIs.

She was named in the Pakistan squad for the 2024 Women's T20 World Cup. In October 2024, she was ranked no.1 T20I bowler and overtook Sophie Ecclestone and became the first player from Pakistan to the top-ranked bowler in the world.

Iqbal was part of the Pakistan squad for the 2025 Women's Cricket World Cup Qualifier at home in April 2025. In May 2025, she again crowned No.1 T20I bowler.

In July 2025, Sadia Iqbal reclaimed the No. 1 spot in the ICC Women’s T20I Bowler Rankings, reaffirming her status as one of the most consistent performers in international cricket. Her impactful performance during the ICC Women’s World Cup Qualifiers in Lahore—where she claimed 9 wickets at an average of 16—was instrumental in Pakistan’s qualification campaign. She was also named in the tournament’s official Team of the Tournament.
