= International XI cricket team in Pakistan, India and Ceylon in 1967–68 =

An International XI cricket team toured numerous countries from January to April 1968 and their itinerary included four first-class matches in Pakistan, India and Ceylon during February and March. The team consisted of Mickey Stewart (captain), Roger Tolchard (wk), Derek Underwood, Dennis Amiss, Keith Fletcher, Khalid Ibadulla, Harold Rhodes, Gamini Goonesena, Ken Suttle, Harry Latchman and Mike Denness.

The match in Ceylon was versus the Ceylon Board President's XI at the Paikiasothy Saravanamuttu Stadium in Colombo, the International XI winning by 194 runs after Underwood produced the outstanding figures of eight for 10 and seven for 33.
