= Harry Latchman =

English cricketer

Personal information
- Full name: Amritt Harrichand Latchman
- Born: 26 July 1943 (age 83); Kingston, Jamaica
- Batting: Right-handed
- Bowling: Right-arm leg-break and googly

Domestic team information
- Years: Team
- 1965–1973: Middlesex
- 1974–1976: Nottinghamshire

Career statistics
Competition	FC	List A
Matches	213	21
Runs scored	2333	145
Batting average	13.25	12.08
100s/50s	0/5	0/0
Top score	96	45 not out
Balls bowled	26,484	714
Wickets	487	15
Bowling average	27.90	33.46
5 wickets in innings	22	–
10 wickets in match	1	n/a
Best bowling	7/65	3/26
Catches/stumpings	107/–	4/–
- Source: Cricinfo, 4 July 2018

Amritt Harrichand "Harry" Latchman (born 26 July 1943) is a former English cricketer who played first-class cricket for Middlesex and Nottinghamshire between 1965 and 1976. A leg-spin bowler and useful lower-order right-handed batsman, he played over 200 first-class cricket matches for his two English counties, securing nearly 500 wickets.

== Early life ==
Born in Kingston, Jamaica, Harry Latchman came to England with his parents and went to school in Shepherd's Bush in London.

== Career ==
Having played for Middlesex until 1974, where his benefit year raised 1,486 pounds, he joined Nottinghamshire for three years before retiring to minor county cricket with Cambridgeshire.

He had his most successful season in 1968, when he took 88 wickets at an average of 18.88. He was asked by the West Indian authorities if he would be available to tour England in 1969, but when he replied that he wanted to clarify his situation with regards to continuing to play for Middlesex, they assumed he intended to qualify for the England Test team and did not select him.

His best innings figures in first-class cricket were 7 for 65 for Nottinghamshire against Essex in 1975, and his best match figures were 10 for 154 for Middlesex against Derbyshire in the first match of the 1971 season. He made his highest score of 96 after going in as nightwatchman against Worcestershire in 1972.

Throughout his first-class playing career he appeared in Wisden as "H. C. Latchman". In later years he coached at Nottingham High School and at Merchant Taylors' School, where he was Head of Cricket for 24 years. He was elected President of Middlesex County Cricket Club at the 151st Annual General Meeting on 7 April 2015.
