= Waheeda Akhtar =

Pakistani cricketer (born 1995)

Personal information
- Full name: Waheeda Akhtar
- Born: 10 April 1995 (age 31); Chiniot, Punjab, Pakistan
- Batting: Right-handed
- Bowling: Right-arm medium-fast

International information
- National side: Pakistan
- Only ODI (cap 90): 14 September 2023 v South Africa
- ODI shirt no.: 32
- T20I debut (cap 55): 29 October 2023 v Bangladesh
- Last T20I: 9 December 2023 v New Zealand
- T20I shirt no.: 32
- Source: ESPNCricinfo, 29 October 2023

Waheeda Akhtar (born 10 April 1995) is a Pakistani cricketer who plays as right arm medium fast bowler.

== International career ==
In August 2023, she was named in Pakistan's ODI squad for the series against South Africa. On 14 September 2023, she made her ODI debut in 3rd ODI of the same series.

In October 2023, she was named in T20I squad for the series against Bangladesh. On 29 October 2023, she made her T20I debut in 3rd T20I of the same series.
