= Syeda Aroob Shah =

Pakistani cricketer (born 2003)

Personal information
- Full name: Syeda Aroob Shah
- Born: 31 December 2003 (age 22); Karachi, Pakistan
- Batting: Right-handed
- Bowling: Right-arm leg break
- Role: Bowler

International information
- National side: Pakistan
- ODI debut (cap 81): 4 November 2019 v Bangladesh
- Last ODI: 14 December 2019 v England
- T20I debut (cap 47): 17 December 2019 v England
- Last T20I: 1 September 2023 v South Africa
- T20I shirt no.: 2

Domestic team information
- Years: Team
- 2017: Karachi

Career statistics
Competition	WODI	WT20I	WLA	WT20
Matches	2	5	23	21
Runs scored	0	3	16	10
Batting average	0.00	3.00	3.20	3.33
100s/50s	0/0	0/0	0/0	0/0
Top score	0*	3*	6	3*
Balls bowled	60	114	952	420
Wickets	2	3	34	14
Bowling average	18.50	47.33	19.35	31.07
5 wickets in innings	0	0	2	0
10 wickets in match	0	0	0	0
Best bowling	2/37	1/21	6/41	2/13
Catches/stumpings	0/–	2/–	4/–	6/–
- Source: CricketArchive, 6 January 2022

Syeda Aroob Shah (born 31 December 2003) is a Pakistani cricketer who plays as a right-arm leg break bowler for Pakistan. In October 2019, she was added to Pakistan's squad for their series against Bangladesh. She made her Women's One Day International (WODI) debut for Pakistan, against Bangladesh, on 4 November 2019. She made her Women's Twenty20 International (WT20I) debut for Pakistan, against England, on 17 December 2019. In January 2020, she was named in Pakistan's squad for the 2020 ICC Women's T20 World Cup in Australia. In December 2020, she was shortlisted as one of the Women's Emerging Cricketer of the Year for the 2020 PCB Awards. She was named in the Pakistan squad for the 2024 ICC Women's T20 World Cup. Shah was part of the Pakistan squad for the 2025 Women's Cricket World Cup Qualifier at home in April 2025.
