= Ghulam Fatima =

Pakistani cricketer (born 1995)

Personal information
- Full name: Ghulam Fatima
- Born: 5 October 1995 (age 31); Sialkot, Pakistan
- Batting: Right-handed
- Bowling: Right-arm leg break
- Role: Bowler

International information
- National side: Pakistan (2017–present)
- ODI debut (cap 73): 7 February 2017 v South Africa
- Last ODI: 9 November 2022 v Ireland
- T20I debut (cap 40): 28 March 2018 v Sri Lanka
- Last T20I: 16 November 2022 v Ireland

Domestic team information
- Years: Team
- 2015–2017: Higher Education Commission
- 2016–2018/19: State Bank of Pakistan

Career statistics
Competition	WODI	WT20I	WLA	WT20
Matches	4	2	37	20
Runs scored	1	6	41	8
Batting average	1.00	6.00	3.72	8.00
100s/50s	0/0	0/0	0/0	0/0
Top score	1*	6*	10	6*
Balls bowled	201	38	1,714	398
Wickets	9	0	54	9
Bowling average	17.88	–	20.62	47.33
5 wickets in innings	0	0	0	0
10 wickets in match	0	0	0	0
Best bowling	3/28	–	4/20	2/19
Catches/stumpings	2/–	0/–	5/–	1/–
- Source: CricketArchive, 29 November 2022

Ghulam Fatima (born 5 October 1995) is a Pakistani cricketer who plays as a right-arm leg break bowler. She appeared in three One Day Internationals and two Twenty20 Internationals for Pakistan in 2017 and 2018. She has played domestic cricket for the Higher Education Commission and State Bank of Pakistan.

She made her One Day International debut against South Africa in the 2017 Women's Cricket World Cup Qualifier on 7 February 2017. She made her Twenty20 International debut against Sri Lanka on 28 March 2018. She was part of Pakistan's team at the 2022 Women's Cricket World Cup in New Zealand.
