= Muneeba Ali =

Pakistani cricketer (born 1997)

Personal information
- Full name: Muneeba Ali Siddiqi
- Born: 8 August 1997 (age 29); Karachi, Pakistan
- Batting: Left-handed
- Role: Wicket-keeper

International information
- National side: Pakistan (2016–present)
- ODI debut (cap 76): 20 March 2018 v Sri Lanka
- Last ODI: 19 April 2025 v Bangladesh
- T20I debut (cap 36): 16 March 2016 v West Indies
- Last T20I: 10 August 2025 v Ireland
- T20I shirt no.: 17

Domestic team information
- Years: Team
- 2011/12: Balochistan
- 2014: Omar Associates
- 2014, 2017, 2023/24: Karachi
- 2015/16–2016/17: State Bank of Pakistan
- 2018–2018/19: Zarai Taraqiati Bank Limited

Career statistics
Competition	WODI	WT20I	WLA	WT20
Matches	49	80	100	143
Runs scored	1,189	1,443	2,507	2,973
Batting average	25.84	20.32	28.81	24.17
100s/50s	1/4	2/2	3/11	3/12
Top score	107	102	140	108
Catches/stumpings	23/4	22/18	46/16	41/23
- Source: CricketArchive, 11 September 2025

Muneeba Ali Siddiqui (Urdu: منیبہ علی صدیقی; born 8 August 1997) is a Pakistani cricketer who plays as a wicket-keeper and left-handed batter. She currently plays for Pakistan, and has played domestic cricket for Balochistan, Omar Associates, Karachi, State Bank of Pakistan, Zarai Taraqiati Bank Limited, and PCB Strikers.

== Career ==
She was part of the Pakistan squad at the 2016 ICC Women's World Twenty20, making her WT20I debut in the competition. She made her Women's One Day International (WODI) debut against Sri Lanka on 20 March 2018.

In October 2018, she was named in Pakistan's squad for the 2018 ICC Women's World Twenty20 tournament in the West Indies. In January 2020, she was in Pakistan's squad for the 2020 ICC Women's T20 World Cup in Australia. In December 2020, she was shortlisted as one of the Women's Cricketer of the Year for the 2020 PCB Awards.

In October 2021, she was named in Pakistan's team for the 2021 Women's Cricket World Cup Qualifier tournament in Zimbabwe. In January 2022, she was named in Pakistan's team for the 2022 Women's Cricket World Cup in New Zealand. In May 2022, she was named in Pakistan's team for the cricket tournament at the 2022 Commonwealth Games in Birmingham, England.

On 15 February 2023, Ali became the first Pakistani woman to score a WT20I century when she scored 102 off 68 balls against Ireland in Pakistan's second match of the 2023 ICC Women's T20 World Cup in South Africa. This also made her only the sixth batter to score a century at the Women's T20 World Cup.

She was named in the Pakistan squad for the 2024 ICC Women's T20 World Cup.

Ali was part of the Pakistan squad for the 2025 Women's Cricket World Cup Qualifier at home in April 2025.
