= Saba Nazir =

Pakistani cricketer (born 1992)

Personal information
- Full name: Saba Nazir
- Born: 1 November 1992 (age 34); Muridke, Punjab, Pakistan
- Batting: Right-handed
- Bowling: Right-arm off break
- Role: Bowler

International information
- National side: Pakistan
- Only T20I (cap 46): 30 October 2019 v Bangladesh

Domestic team information
- Years: Team
- 2011/12: Balochistan
- 2015–2016: Sialkot
- 2015/16–2018/19: Higher Education Commission

Career statistics
Competition	WT20I	WLA	WT20
Matches	1	33	24
Runs scored	4	206	75
Batting average	–	10.84	12.50
100s/50s	0/0	0/1	0/0
Top score	4*	52	21*
Balls bowled	24	1,703	438
Wickets	2	50	22
Bowling average	11.00	23.60	19.22
5 wickets in innings	0	0	0
10 wickets in match	0	0	0
Best bowling	2/22	4/14	3/18
Catches/stumpings	0/–	5/–	6/–
- Source: CricketArchive, 2 January 2022

Saba Nazir (born 1 November 1992) is a Pakistani cricketer who plays as a right-arm off break bowler. In October 2019, she was named in Pakistan's squad for their series against Bangladesh. She made her Women's Twenty20 International (WT20I) debut against the visiting Bangladesh in that series, on 30 October 2019.

In June 2021, she was named in Pakistan's squad for their series against the West Indies.
