= Javeria Khan =

Pakistani cricketer

Personal information
- Full name: Javeria Khan
- Born: 14 May 1988 (age 38); Karachi, Pakistan
- Batting: Right-handed
- Bowling: Right-arm off break
- Role: All-rounder

International information
- National side: Pakistan (2008–2023)
- ODI debut (cap 50): 6 May 2008 v Sri Lanka
- Last ODI: 6 March 2022 v India
- ODI shirt no.: 1
- T20I debut (cap 4): 25 May 2009 v Ireland
- Last T20I: 15 February 2023 v Ireland
- T20I shirt no.: 1

Domestic team information
- Years: Team
- 2006/07–2007/08: Karachi
- 2009/10–2018/19: Zarai Taraqiati Bank Limited
- 2010/11: Karachi
- 2014: Karachi

Career statistics
Competition	WODI	WT20I	WLA	WT20
Matches	116	112	199	170
Runs scored	2,885	2,018	6,031	3,276
Batting average	28.56	21.69	38.66	25.20
100s/50s	2/15	0/9	11/32	0/18
Top score	133*	74*	161	74*
Balls bowled	860	240	1,994	570
Wickets	17	11	65	27
Bowling average	37.41	20.18	18.72	17.96
5 wickets in innings	0	0	1	0
10 wickets in match	0	0	0	0
Best bowling	3/22	2/23	6/18	4/4
Catches/stumpings	34/–	15/–	68/–	30/–
Medal record
Representing Pakistan
Women's Cricket
Asian Games
Gold medal – first place	2010 Guangzhou	Team
Gold medal – first place	2014 Incheon	Team
- Source: CricketArchive, 12 February 2023

Javeria Khan (Urdu: جویریہ خان) (born 14 May 1988) is a former Pakistani cricketer who played as an all-rounder, batting right-handed and bowling right-arm off break. She played international cricket for Pakistan from 2008 till 2023. She has also played domestic cricket for Karachi and Zarai Taraqiati Bank Limited. On 21 March 2024, she announced her retirement from international cricket.

== International career ==
Javeria made her one-day debut against Sri Lanka on 6 May 2008. In October 2018, she was named in Pakistan's squad for the 2018 ICC Women's World Twenty20 tournament in the West Indies. Later the same month, she was named as the captain of the side, after Bismah Maroof stepped down from the role. Ahead of the tournament, she was named as one of the players to watch. She was the leading run-scorer for Pakistan in the tournament, with 136 runs in four matches.

In September 2010, Javeria was selected to play in the 2010 Asian Games in China.

Javeria was part of the Pakistani teams that won the gold medal in the women's cricket competition at the 2010 and 2014 Asian Games.

In November 2019, during the series against Bangladesh, she became the third female cricketer for Pakistan to play in 100 WODIs. In January 2020, she was named in Pakistan's squad for the 2020 ICC Women's T20 World Cup in Australia. She was the leading run-scorer for Pakistan in the tournament, with 82 runs in four matches.

In December 2020, Khan was named the captain of Pakistan's squad for their tour to South Africa, after Bismah Maroof withdrew from the tour due to family reasons. Later the same month, she was shortlisted as one of the Women's Cricketer of the Year for the 2020 PCB Awards. In October 2021, she was named as the captain of Pakistan's team for the 2021 Women's Cricket World Cup Qualifier tournament in Zimbabwe. In January 2022, she was named in Pakistan's team for the 2022 Women's Cricket World Cup in New Zealand.
