= 2020 Women's T20 World Cup =

7th edition of the Women's T20 World Cup

2020 Women’s T20 World Cup
- Dates: 21 February – 8 March 2020
- Administrator: International Cricket Council
- Cricket format: Women's Twenty20 International
- Tournament format(s): Group stage & knockout
- Host: Australia
- Champions: Australia (5th title)
- Runners-up: India
- Participants: 10
- Matches: 23
- Attendance: 136,549 (5,937 per match)
- Player of the series: (Australia) Beth Mooney
- Most runs: (Australia) Beth Mooney (259)
- Most wickets: (Australia) Megan Schutt (13)
- Official website: iccworldtwenty20.com

The 2020 Women's T20 World Cup was the seventh Women's T20 World Cup tournament. It was held in Australia between 21 February and 8 March 2020. The final took place at the Melbourne Cricket Ground on International Women's Day. Hosts Australia won the tournament, beating India by 85 runs, to win their fifth title.

It was a standalone tournament, the men's tournament was initially held eight months ahead of the schedule, but would be postponed to 2021 due to the COVID-19 pandemic. Australia were the defending champions, and lost their opening match of the tournament against India. For the first time at the Women's T20 World Cup, the International Cricket Council (ICC) announced the use of technology to monitor front-foot no-balls for all matches during the tournament. The third umpire assisted the umpire at the bowler's end in calling the front-foot no-balls, communicating this to the on-field umpires.

India were the first team to qualify for the semi-finals, after recording three wins from their first three matches. India won their final group game, against Sri Lanka, and finished top of Group A. South Africa were the second team to qualify for the semi-finals, after they also won their first three group games. England were the third team to advance to the semi-finals, after beating the West Indies in their final group game. In the final match of Group A, hosts Australia beat New Zealand by four runs to take the fourth and final spot in the semi-finals. The final match in Group B, between South Africa and the West Indies, was abandoned due to rain, meaning South Africa finished top of the group. Therefore, England were drawn against India in the first semi-final, and Australia faced South Africa in the second semi-final.

The first semi-final was abandoned with no play due to rain, meaning India advanced to the final, after finishing top of Group A. It was the first time that India had progressed to the final of the Women's T20 World Cup. In the second semi-final, hosts Australia beat South Africa by five runs in a rain-affected match.

== Teams and qualification ==
The tournament featured 10 teams. The eight top-ranked teams based on finishing positions from the 2018 ICC Women's World Twenty20 qualified automatically. The remaining two qualification spots were determined through the 2019 ICC Women's World Twenty20 Qualifier, with Bangladesh and Thailand progressing. It was the first time that Thailand had qualified for a Women's T20 World Cup tournament. Following the conclusion of the qualification tournament, Bangladesh were placed in Group A and Thailand were placed in Group B.

| Team | Qualification |
|---|---|
| Australia | Host nation |
| England | Automatic qualification |
| India | Automatic qualification |
| New Zealand | Automatic qualification |
| Pakistan | Automatic qualification |
| South Africa | Automatic qualification |
| Sri Lanka | Automatic qualification |
| West Indies | Automatic qualification |
| Bangladesh | Via qualifying tournament |
| Thailand | Via qualifying tournament |

== Squads ==
Each team selected a squad of 15 players before the tournament, and were also able to replace any injured players.

== Venues ==
In January 2018, the ICC announced that six venues in four cities would host matches. The semi-finals were hosted at the Sydney Cricket Ground, with the final being played at the Melbourne Cricket Ground.

Venues of 2020 ICC World T20 in Australia

| Canberra | Melbourne | |
|---|---|---|
| Manuka Oval | Junction Oval | Melbourne Cricket Ground |
| Capacity: 13,550 | Capacity: 7,000 | Capacity: 100,024 |
| Matches: Group stage | Matches: Group stage | Matches: Final |
| Perth | Sydney | |
| WACA Ground | Sydney Showground Stadium | Sydney Cricket Ground |
| Capacity: 24,500 | Capacity: 22,000 | Capacity: 48,000 |
| Matches: Group stage | Matches: Group stage | Matches: Semi finals |

== Match officials ==
On 12 February 2020, the ICC appointed the officials for the tournament. Along with the twelve umpires, Steve Bernard, Chris Broad and G. S. Lakshmi were also named as the match referees.

- Lauren Agenbag
- Gregory Brathwaite
- Chris Brown
- Kim Cotton
- Shaun George
- Nitin Menon

- Claire Polosak
- Ahsan Raza
- Sue Redfern
- Langton Rusere
- Alex Wharf
- Jacqueline Williams

== Group stage ==
The ICC released the fixture details on 29 January 2019 in Sydney.

=== Group A ===
| Pos | Team | Pld | W | L | T | NR | Pts | NRR |
|---|---|---|---|---|---|---|---|---|
| 1 | India | 4 | 4 | 0 | 0 | 0 | 8 | 0.979 |
| 2 | Australia | 4 | 3 | 1 | 0 | 0 | 6 | 0.971 |
| 3 | New Zealand | 4 | 2 | 2 | 0 | 0 | 4 | 0.364 |
| 4 | Sri Lanka | 4 | 1 | 3 | 0 | 0 | 2 | −0.404 |
| 5 | Bangladesh | 4 | 0 | 4 | 0 | 0 | 0 | −1.908 |

Source: ESPNCricinfo

Advance to Knockout stage

21 February 2020
19:00 (N)
Scorecard

| India; 132/4 (20 overs) | v | Australia; 115 (19.5 overs) |
| Deepti Sharma 49* (46); Jess Jonassen 2/24 (4 overs) | | Alyssa Healy 51 (35); Poonam Yadav 4/19 (4 overs) |

India Women won by 17 runs
Sydney Showground Stadium, Sydney
Umpires: Shaun George (SA) and Jacqueline Williams (WI)
Player of the match: Poonam Yadav (Ind)

- Australia Women won the toss and elected to field.

22 February 2020
19:00 (N)
Scorecard

| Sri Lanka; 127/7 (20 overs) | v | New Zealand; 131/3 (17.4 overs) |
| Chamari Athapaththu 41 (30); Hayley Jensen 3/16 (4 overs) | | Sophie Devine 75* (55); Kavisha Dilhari 1/19 (2 overs) |

New Zealand Women won by 7 wickets
WACA Ground, Perth
Umpires: Ahsan Raza (Pak) and Sue Redfern (Eng)
Player of the match: Hayley Jensen (NZ)

- New Zealand Women won the toss and elected to field.
- Sophie Devine (NZ) became the first cricketer, male or female, to make six consecutive scores of fifty or more in T20I cricket.

24 February 2020
15:00
Scorecard

| Sri Lanka; 122/6 (20 overs) | v | Australia; 123/5 (19.3 overs) |
| Chamari Athapaththu 50 (38); Nicola Carey 2/18 (3 overs) | | Rachael Haynes 60 (47); Udeshika Prabodhani 2/17 (4 overs) |

Australia Women won by 5 wickets
WACA Ground, Perth
Umpires: Gregory Brathwaite (WI) and Kim Cotton (NZ)
Player of the match: Rachael Haynes (Aus)

- Sri Lanka Women won the toss and elected to bat.
- Meg Lanning (Aus) played in her 100th WT20I.

24 February 2020
19:00 (N)
Scorecard

| India; 142/6 (20 overs) | v | Bangladesh; 124/8 (20 overs) |
| Shafali Verma 39 (17); Salma Khatun 2/25 (4 overs); Panna Ghosh 2/25 (4 overs) | | Nigar Sultana 35 (26); Poonam Yadav 3/18 (4 overs) |

India Women won by 18 runs
WACA Ground, Perth
Umpires: Lauren Agenbag (SA) and Alex Wharf (Eng)
Player of the match: Shafali Verma (Ind)

- Bangladesh Women won the toss and elected to field.

27 February 2020
15:00
Scorecard

| India; 133/8 (20 overs) | v | New Zealand; 130/6 (20 overs) |
| Shafali Verma 46 (34); Amelia Kerr 2/21 (4 overs) | | Amelia Kerr 34* (19); Shikha Pandey 1/21 (4 overs) |

India Women won by 3 runs
Junction Oval, Melbourne
Umpires: Langton Rusere (Zim) and Alex Wharf (Eng)
Player of the match: Shafali Verma (Ind)

- New Zealand Women won the toss and elected to field.

27 February 2020
19:00 (N)
Scorecard

| Australia; 189/1 (20 overs) | v | Bangladesh; 103/9 (20 overs) |
| Alyssa Healy 83 (53); Salma Khatun 1/39 (4 overs) | | Fargana Hoque 36 (35); Megan Schutt 3/21 (4 overs) |

Australia Women won by 86 runs
Manuka Oval, Canberra
Umpires: Gregory Brathwaite (WI) and Nitin Menon (Ind)
Player of the match: Alyssa Healy (Aus)

- Australia Women won the toss and elected to bat.
- Alyssa Healy and Beth Mooney made the highest partnership for Australia Women for any wicket in WT20Is (151 runs).

29 February 2020
11:00
Scorecard

| New Zealand; 91 (18.2 overs) | v | Bangladesh; 74 (19.5 overs) |
| Rachel Priest 25 (32); Ritu Moni 4/18 (4 overs) | | Nigar Sultana 21 (26); Hayley Jensen 3/11 (4 overs) |

New Zealand Women won by 17 runs
Junction Oval, Melbourne
Umpires: Lauren Agenbag (SA) and Ahsan Raza (Pak)
Player of the match: Hayley Jensen (NZ)

- New Zealand Women won the toss and elected to bat.
- New Zealand successfully defended the lowest total in a Women's T20 World Cup match.

29 February 2020
15:00
Scorecard

| Sri Lanka; 113/9 (20 overs) | v | India; 116/3 (14.4 overs) |
| Chamari Athapaththu 33 (24); Radha Yadav 4/23 (4 overs) | | Shafali Verma 47 (34); Udeshika Prabodhani 1/13 (4 overs) |

India Women won by 7 wickets
Junction Oval, Melbourne
Umpires: Shaun George (SA) and Sue Redfern (Eng)
Player of the match: Radha Yadav (Ind)

- Sri Lanka Women won the toss and elected to bat.
- Sathya Sandeepani (SL) made her WT20I debut.

2 March 2020
11:00
Scorecard

| Bangladesh; 91/8 (20 overs) | v | Sri Lanka; 92/1 (15.3 overs) |
| Nigar Sultana 39 (45); Shashikala Siriwardene 4/16 (4 overs) | | Hasini Perera 39* (53); Nahida Akter 1/18 (3.3 overs) |

Sri Lanka Women won by 9 wickets
Junction Oval, Melbourne
Umpires: Sue Redfern (Eng) and Alex Wharf (Eng)
Player of the match: Shashikala Siriwardene (SL)

- Bangladesh Women won the toss and elected to bat.

2 March 2020
15:00
Scorecard

| Australia; 155/5 (20 overs) | v | New Zealand; 151/7 (20 overs) |
| Beth Mooney 60 (50); Anna Peterson 2/31 (4 overs) | | Katey Martin 37* (18); Georgia Wareham 3/17 (4 overs) |

Australia Women won by 4 runs
Junction Oval, Melbourne
Umpires: Lauren Agenbag (SA) and Langton Rusere (Zim)
Player of the match: Georgia Wareham (Aus)

- New Zealand Women won the toss and elected to field.

=== Group B ===
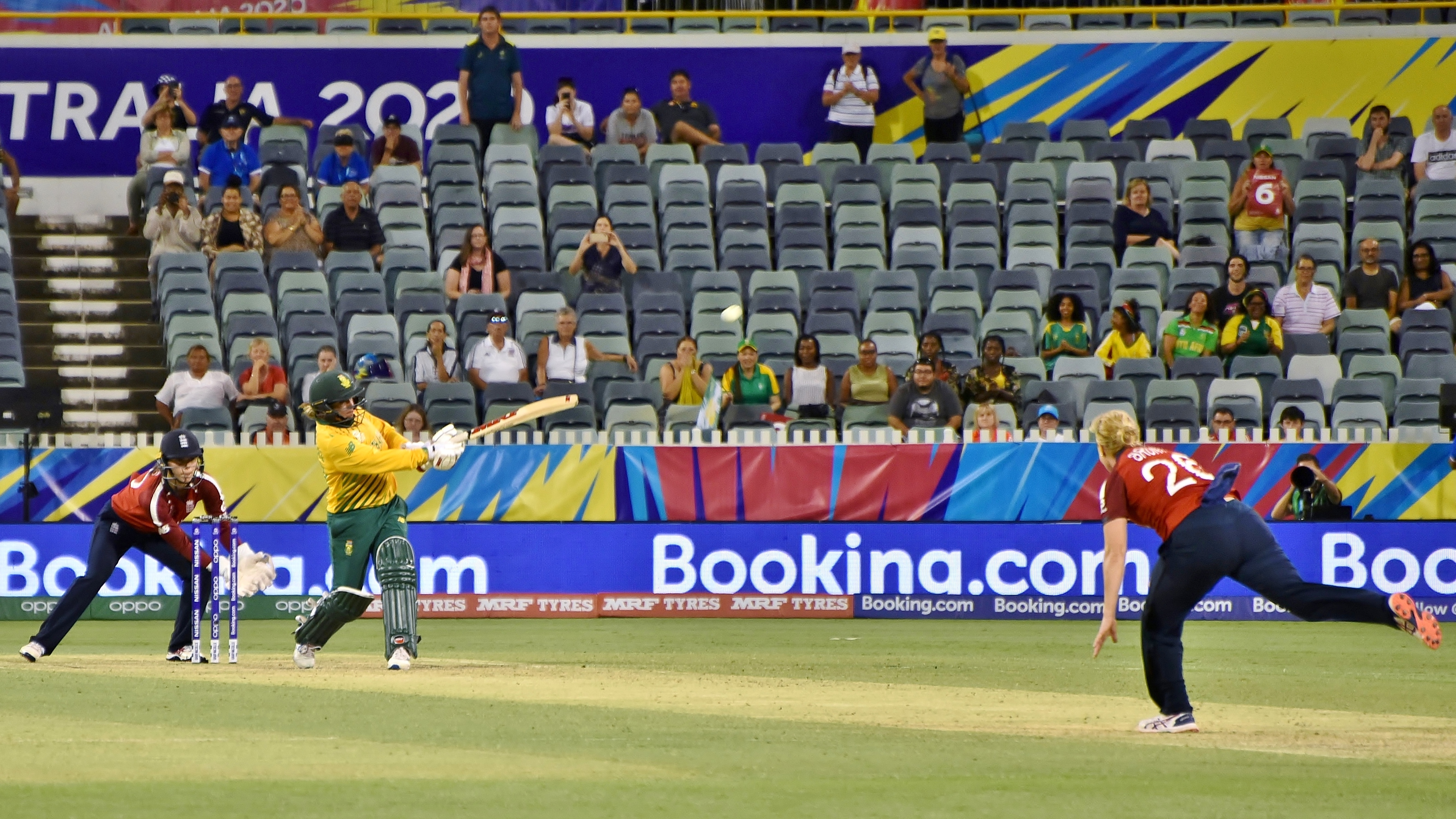
At the end of the Group B England v South Africa match at the WACA Ground, Mignon du Preez hits the winning runs that ultimately knocked England out of the tournament.

| Pos | Team | Pld | W | L | T | NR | Pts | NRR |
|---|---|---|---|---|---|---|---|---|
| 1 | South Africa | 4 | 3 | 0 | 0 | 1 | 7 | 2.226 |
| 2 | England | 4 | 3 | 1 | 0 | 0 | 6 | 2.291 |
| 3 | West Indies | 4 | 1 | 2 | 0 | 1 | 3 | −0.654 |
| 4 | Pakistan | 4 | 1 | 2 | 0 | 1 | 3 | −0.761 |
| 5 | Thailand | 4 | 0 | 3 | 0 | 1 | 1 | −3.992 |

Source: ESPNCricinfo

Advance to Knockout stage

22 February 2020
15:00
Scorecard

| Thailand; 78/9 (20 overs) | v | West Indies; 80/3 (16.4 overs) |
| Nannapat Koncharoenkai 33 (48); Stafanie Taylor 3/13 (3 overs) | | Stafanie Taylor 26* (37); Soraya Lateh 1/21 (3 overs) |

West Indies Women won by 7 wickets
WACA Ground, Perth
Umpires: Nitin Menon (Ind) and Claire Polosak (Aus)
Player of the match: Stafanie Taylor (WI)

- Thailand Women won the toss and elected to bat.
- Shemaine Campbelle (WI) played in her 100th WT20I.

23 February 2020
19:00 (N)
Scorecard

| England; 123/8 (20 overs) | v | South Africa; 127/4 (19.4 overs) |
| Nat Sciver 50 (41); Ayabonga Khaka 3/25 (4 overs) | | Dane van Niekerk 46 (51); Sophie Ecclestone 2/19 (4 overs) |

South Africa Women won by 6 wickets
WACA Ground, Perth
Umpires: Chris Brown (NZ) and Langton Rusere (Zim)
Player of the match: Dane van Niekerk (SA)

- South Africa Women won the toss and elected to field.
- Mignon du Preez (SA) played in her 100th WT20I.

26 February 2020
15:00
Scorecard

| England; 176/2 (20 overs) | v | Thailand; 78/7 (20 overs) |
| Heather Knight 108* (66); Nattaya Boochatham 1/18 (3 overs) | | Natthakan Chantam 32 (53); Anya Shrubsole 3/21 (4 overs) |

England Women won by 98 runs
Manuka Oval, Canberra
Umpires: Ahsan Raza (Pak) and Jacqueline Williams (WI)
Player of the match: Heather Knight (Eng)

- Thailand Women won the toss and elected to field.
- Heather Knight (Eng) scored her 1,000th run in WT20Is.
- Heather Knight (Eng) scored her first century in WT20Is, and became the first cricketer to score a century in all three formats of women's international cricket.
- Heather Knight and Nat Sciver's 169-run partnership was the highest for England for any wicket in WT20Is.

26 February 2020
19:00 (N)
Scorecard

| West Indies; 124/7 (20 overs) | v | Pakistan; 127/2 (18.2 overs) |
| Shemaine Campbelle 43 (46); Diana Baig 2/19 (4 overs) | | Bismah Maroof 38* (37); Stafanie Taylor 1/20 (3.2 overs) |

Pakistan Women won by 8 wickets
Manuka Oval, Canberra
Umpires: Shaun George (SA) and Claire Polosak (Aus)
Player of the match: Javeria Khan (Pak)

- West Indies Women won the toss and elected to bat.

28 February 2020
15:00
Scorecard

| South Africa; 195/3 (20 overs) | v | Thailand; 82 (19.1 overs) |
| Lizelle Lee 101 (60); Ratanaporn Padunglerd 1/19 (3 overs) | | Onnicha Kamchomphu 26 (21); Shabnim Ismail 3/8 (3.1 overs) |

South Africa Women won by 113 runs
Manuka Oval, Canberra
Umpires: Kim Cotton (NZ) and Jacqueline Williams (WI)
Player of the match: Lizelle Lee (SA)

- South Africa Women won the toss and elected to bat.
- Lizelle Lee (SA) scored her first century in WT20Is.

28 February 2020
19:00 (N)
Scorecard

| England; 158/7 (20 overs) | v | Pakistan; 116 (19.4 overs) |
| Heather Knight 62 (47); Aiman Anwer 3/30 (4 overs) | | Aliya Riaz 41 (33); Sarah Glenn 3/15 (4 overs) |

England Women won by 42 runs
Manuka Oval, Canberra
Umpires: Chris Brown (NZ) and Nitin Menon (Ind)
Player of the match: Heather Knight (Eng)

- Pakistan Women won the toss and elected to field.
- Nida Dar (Pak) played in her 100th WT20I.
- Anya Shrubsole (Eng) took her 100th wicket in WT20Is.

1 March 2020
15:00
Scorecard

| South Africa; 136/6 (20 overs) | v | Pakistan; 119/5 (20 overs) |
| Laura Wolvaardt 53* (36); Diana Baig 2/19 (4 overs) | | Aliya Riaz 39* (32); Shabnim Ismail 1/17 (4 overs); Dane van Niekerk 1/17 (4 overs) |

South Africa Women won by 17 runs
Sydney Showground Stadium, Sydney
Umpires: Gregory Brathwaite (WI) and Kim Cotton (NZ)
Player of the match: Laura Wolvaardt (SA)

- South Africa Women won the toss and elected to bat.

1 March 2020
19:00 (N)
Scorecard

| England; 143/5 (20 overs) | v | West Indies; 97 (17.1 overs) |
| Nat Sciver 57 (56); Shakera Selman 1/23 (4 overs); Anisa Mohammed 1/23 (4 overs) | | Lee-Ann Kirby 20 (15); Sophie Ecclestone 3/7 (3.1 overs) |

England Women won by 46 runs
Sydney Showground Stadium, Sydney
Umpires: Chris Brown (NZ) and Claire Polosak (Aus)
Player of the match: Nat Sciver (Eng)

- England Women won the toss and elected to bat.
- Sophie Ecclestone (Eng) took her 50th wicket in WT20Is, and her 100th wicket in international cricket.

3 March 2020
15:00
Scorecard

| Thailand; 150/3 (20 overs) | v | Pakistan |
| Natthakan Chantam 56 (50); Nida Dar 1/17 (4 overs) |

No result
Sydney Showground Stadium, Sydney
Umpires: Chris Brown (NZ) and Claire Polosak (Aus)

- Thailand Women won the toss and elected to bat.
- Rain during the innings break prevented any further play.
- Ayesha Naseem (Pak) made her WT20I debut.
- Thailand Women scored their highest total in WT20Is.

3 March 2020
19:00 (N)
Scorecard

| South Africa | v | West Indies |

Match abandoned
Sydney Showground Stadium, Sydney
Umpires: Kim Cotton (NZ) and Nitin Menon (Ind)

- West Indies Women Won the toss and elected to Field.
- No play was possible due to rain.

== Knockout stage ==
Semifinals
India | Advanced
England
Australia | 134/5 (20 overs)
South Africa | 92/5 (13 overs)

Final
India | 99 (19.1 overs)
Australia | 184/4 (20 overs)

=== Semi-finals ===
5 March 2020
15:00
Scorecard

| India | v | England |

Match abandoned
Sydney Cricket Ground, Sydney
Umpires: Claire Polosak (Aus) and Ahsan Raza (Pak)

- No toss.
- No play was possible due to rain.
- India Women advanced to final after finishing top of Group A.

5 March 2020
19:00 (N)
Scorecard

| Australia; 134/5 (20 overs) | v | South Africa; 92/5 (13 overs) |
| Meg Lanning 49* (49); Nadine de Klerk 3/19 (4 overs) | | Laura Wolvaardt 41* (27); Megan Schutt 2/17 (3 overs) |

Australia Women won by 5 runs (DLS method)
Sydney Cricket Ground, Sydney
Umpires: Kim Cotton (NZ) and Nitin Menon (Ind)
Player of the match: Meg Lanning (Aus)

- South Africa Women won the toss and elected to field.
- South Africa Women were set a revised target of 98 runs from 13 overs due to rain.

=== Final ===
8 March 2020
18:00 (N)
Scorecard

| Australia; 184/4 (20 overs) | v | India; 99 (19.1 overs) |
| Beth Mooney 78* (54); Deepti Sharma 2/38 (4 overs) | | Deepti Sharma 33 (35); Megan Schutt 4/18 (3.1 overs) |

Australia Women won by 85 runs
Melbourne Cricket Ground, Melbourne
Umpires: Kim Cotton (NZ) and Ahsan Raza (Pak)
Player of the match: Alyssa Healy (Aus)

- Australia Women won the toss and elected to bat.
- Alyssa Healy (Aus) scored her 2,000th run in WT20Is.
- Richa Ghosh (Ind) replaced Taniya Bhatia as a concussion substitute after 11.3 overs of India's innings.

== Statistics ==
=== Highest Run-scorers ===
| Runs | Player | Team |
|---|---|---|
| 259 | Beth Mooney | Australia |
| 236 | Alyssa Healy | Australia |
| 202 | Nat Sciver-Brunt | England |
| 193 | Heather Knight | England |
| 163 | Shafali Verma | India |

- Source: CricInfo

=== Highest Wicket-takers ===
| Wickets | Player | Team |
|---|---|---|
| 13 | Megan Schutt | Australia |
| 10 | Poonam Yadav | India |
| 10 | Jess Jonassen | Australia |
| 8 | Sophie Ecclestone | England |
| 8 | Anya Shrubsole | England |

- Source: CricInfo

=== Team of the tournament ===
On 9 March 2020, ICC announced its team of the tournament picked by a selection panel featuring Ian Bishop, Anjum Chopra, Lisa Sthalekar, Raf Nicholson and Holly Colvin.

- (Australia) Alyssa Healy (wk)
- (Australia) Beth Mooney
- (England) Nat Sciver
- (England) Heather Knight
- (Australia) Meg Lanning (c)
- (South Africa) Laura Wolvaardt
- (Australia) Jess Jonassen
- (England) Sophie Ecclestone
- (England) Anya Shrubsole
- (Australia) Megan Schutt
- (India) Poonam Yadav
- (India) Shafali Verma (12th woman)

== Marketing ==
UNICEF Australia, the United Nations Children's Fund was chosen as the official charity partner for the tournament. Proceeds were raised throughout the competition to support UNICEF Australia's Sports for Development program to empower girls and boys in Sri Lanka.

Tickets for the event went on sale on 21 February 2019. All matches, including the final, had ticket prices for adults starting from $20. The ICC stated that more than half of all tickets available for sale for the tournament were priced at $20, with child tickets priced at $5. Star Sports were awarded the global broadcast rights for the tournament.
