= Diana Baig =

Pakistani cricketer (born 1995)

Personal information
- Full name: Diana Baig
- Born: 15 October 1995 (age 31); Hunza, Gilgit Baltistan, Pakistan
- Batting: Right-handed
- Bowling: Right-arm medium-fast
- Role: Bowler

International information
- National side: Pakistan (2015–present)
- ODI debut (cap 71): 4 October 2015 v Bangladesh
- Last ODI: 10 November 2023 v Bangladesh
- T20I debut (cap 35): 1 November 2015 v West Indies
- Last T20I: 1 September 2023 v South Africa
- T20I shirt no.: 42

Domestic team information
- Years: Team
- 2009/10–2014: Islamabad
- 2011/12–2012/13: Federal Capital
- 2014: Saif Sports Saga
- 2015–2016: Zarai Taraqiati Bank Limited
- 2017: Higher Education Commission
- 2018: Zarai Taraqiati Bank Limited
- 2018/19: Higher Education Commission

Career statistics
Competition	WODI	WT20I	WLA	WT20
Matches	35	28	81	59
Runs scored	135	33	466	118
Batting average	6.13	5.50	11.09	7.86
100s/50s	0/0	0/0	0/2	0/0
Top score	35*	6*	51*	28
Balls bowled	1,475	553	3,446	1,102
Wickets	37	23	97	40
Bowling average	30.94	23.17	25.06	28.35
5 wickets in innings	0	0	2	0
10 wickets in match	0	0	0	0
Best bowling	4/30	2/12	5/28	3/23
Catches/stumpings	15/–	8/–	39/–	24/–
- Source: CricketArchive, 21 January 2023

Diana Baig (born 15 October 1995) is a Pakistani cricketer and former footballer. In cricket, she plays primarily as a right-arm medium-fast bowler. Baig was included in the Pakistan squad for the 2013 Women's Cricket World Cup and 2016 ICC Women's World Twenty20.

== Early life and education ==
Diana Baig was born in Hunza, Gilgit Baltistan. Her interest in sports started with street cricket and football. Learned and enthusiastic, she moved to Lahore, for her intermediate and undergraduate studies. She opted for Lahore College for Women University, where her endeavors were rewarded by the college. Her multi-talented sporting side has helped her represent her country at international level in both football and cricket. She is fluent in English, Urdu and Burushaski.

== Career ==
=== Football ===
Baig began in football by chance. She was selected for the domestic football team when there was a shortage of players.

=== Cricket ===
Baig started her career in 2010, leading the Gilgit-Baltistan women's cricket team. She was selected for Pakistan's A team in 2012 and for the squad of the full national team in 2013.

She made her international cricket debut in 2015 against Bangladesh.

Her bowling and fielding performance in the ODI against India in 2017 Women's Cricket World Cup was impressive and was praised by Ian Bishop, one of the commentators. She came into the team in place of Kainat Imtiaz, and she immediately made an impact by taking an important wicket, Smriti Mandhana with an inswinger.

In October 2018, she was named in Pakistan's squad for the 2018 ICC Women's World Twenty20 tournament in the West Indies. In January 2020, she was named in Pakistan's squad for the 2020 ICC Women's T20 World Cup in Australia. In October 2021, she was named in Pakistan's team for the 2021 Women's Cricket World Cup Qualifier tournament in Zimbabwe. In January 2022, she was named in Pakistan's team for the 2022 Women's Cricket World Cup in New Zealand. In May 2022, she was named in Pakistan's team for the cricket tournament at the 2022 Commonwealth Games in Birmingham, England.

She was named in the Pakistan squad for the 2024 ICC Women's T20 World Cup.

Baig was part of the Pakistan squad for the 2025 Women's Cricket World Cup Qualifier at home in April 2025.
