= Aliya Riaz =

Pakistani cricketer

Personal information
- Full name: Aliya Riaz
- Born: 24 September 1992 (age 34); Rawalpindi, Punjab, Pakistan
- Batting: Right-handed
- Bowling: Right-arm medium
- Role: All-rounder
- Relatives: Waqar Younis (brother-in-law)

International information
- National side: Pakistan (2014–present)
- ODI debut (cap 70): 23 August 2014 v Australia
- Last ODI: 10 November 2023 v Bangladesh
- T20I debut (cap 30): 30 August 2014 v Australia
- Last T20I: 29 October 2023 v Bangladesh
- T20I shirt no.: 37

Domestic team information
- Years: Team
- 2010/11: Rawalpindi
- 2011/12–2012/13: Federal Capital
- 2011/12–2015: Higher Education Commission
- 2014: Lahore
- 2015/16–2016: State Bank of Pakistan
- 2016/17–2017: Zarai Taraqiati Bank Limited
- 2018–2018/19: State Bank of Pakistan

Career statistics
Competition	WODI	WT20I	WLA	WT20
Matches	38	48	99	93
Runs scored	791	544	2,917	1,146
Batting average	25.51	18.75	41.67	20.10
100s/50s	0/4	0/0	5/16	0/0
Top score	81	41	156*	41
Balls bowled	726	583	2,416	1,002
Wickets	7	17	47	38
Bowling average	93.57	34.29	39.21	32.76
5 wickets in innings	0	0	0	0
10 wickets in match	0	0	0	0
Best bowling	2/49	2/16	4/27	2/9
Catches/stumpings	7/–	15/–	31/–	27/–
Medal record
Representing Pakistan
Women's Cricket
Asian Games
Gold medal – first place	2014 Incheon	Team
Bronze medal – third place	2026 Aichi–Nagoya	Team
- Source: CricketArchive, 21 February 2023

Aliya Riaz (born 24 September 1992) is a Pakistani cricketer who plays as a right-handed batter and right-arm medium bowler for Pakistan. She has also played domestic cricket for Rawalpindi, Federal Capital, Higher Education Commission, Lahore, State Bank of Pakistan and Zarai Taraqiati Bank Limited.

== International career ==
In October 2018, she was named in Pakistan's squad for the 2018 ICC Women's World Twenty20 tournament in the West Indies. She was the leading wicket-taker for Pakistan in the tournament, with six dismissals in four matches. In January 2020, she was named in Pakistan's squad for the 2020 ICC Women's T20 World Cup in Australia. In December 2020, she was shortlisted as one of the Women's Cricketer of the Year for the 2020 PCB Awards.

She was a member of the gold medal-winning Pakistan team at the 2014 Asian Games.

In October 2021, she was named in Pakistan's team for the 2021 Women's Cricket World Cup Qualifier tournament in Zimbabwe. In January 2022, she was named in Pakistan's team for the 2022 Women's Cricket World Cup in New Zealand. In May 2022, she was named in Pakistan's team for the cricket tournament at the 2022 Commonwealth Games in Birmingham, England.

She was named in the Pakistan squad for the 2024 ICC Women's T20 World Cup.

Riaz was part of the Pakistan squad for the 2025 Women's Cricket World Cup Qualifier at home in April 2025.

== Personal life ==
In 2024, she married commentator Ali Younis. Waqar Younis is her brother-in-law.
