= Women's Twenty20 =

Form of limited overs cricket, women's 20-over format

Women's Twenty20 is the use of the Twenty20 match format in women's cricket. In a Twenty20 match, the two teams bat for a single innings each, of a maximum of 20 overs. The wider rules and playing conditions are usually the same for both the men's format and the women's format, with some small variations.

The first women's Twenty20 matches took place concurrently on 29 May 2004, as part of the 2004 Super Fours: Braves versus Super Strikers and Knight Riders versus V Team. These matches were viewed as a warm-up for the first Women's Twenty20 International (and first T20I for either gender), that took place at Hove on 5 August 2004 between England and New Zealand.

Most major cricket nations now have a women's Twenty20 cricket tournament as part of their domestic season. In 2007, the first Women's Interstate Twenty20 began in Australia and the State League Twenty20 began in New Zealand. With the beginning of the Women's Big Bash League in Australia in 2015–16 and the Women's Cricket Super League in England in 2016, domestic women's Twenty20 tournaments started becoming more professionalised. In 2022, the first privately run women's T20 competition was launched, the 2022 FairBreak Invitational T20.

At international level, Twenty20 cricket has been an increasingly prevalent format for women. The first ICC Women's World Twenty20 was held in England in 2009, and was won by the hosts. The final of the 2020 edition in Australia became the most watched women's cricket event ever worldwide with 53 million views, and with 86,174 watching in person at the MCG. The most recent edition was held in South Africa in 2023, with Australia winning an unprecedented sixth title.

== Status ==
In October 2017, the International Cricket Council (ICC) confirmed updated regulations for Classification of Official Cricket. It defined and clarified what constitutes Official Cricket and what does not. According to these regulations, Competitive Women's Cricket is considered as the highest level of domestic women's cricket. The main features of the new regulations on what constitutes Competitive Women's T20 Cricket and what do not are as follows.

=== Matches that qualify as Competitive Women's T20 Cricket ===
- Twenty20 women's cricket matches played either at state or provincial level or official matches of a touring Test team against state, or provincial level teams, or franchise based teams or competitions, substantially conforming to ICC standard playing conditions and accorded the status of Competitive Women's Cricket by the relevant governing bodies.

=== Matches that do not qualify as Competitive Women's T20 Cricket ===
- Matches between the 'A' teams, national academy or age group teams of member countries.
- All other women's cricket matches played as part of a competition or tournament held under the auspices of a member including club cricket, schools, age groups and university cricket.

== Match format and rules ==
Women's Twenty20 cricket mainly follows the same rules as men's Twenty20 cricket. Twenty20 matches are a form of limited overs cricket, with both teams batting for a single innings of 20 overs (120 legal deliveries). The team with the most runs at the conclusion of both innings is the winner of the match.

Some small differences exist between the women's and men's formats: for example, ICC rules state that during non-Powerplay overs in women's matches, 4 fielders are permitted outside the fielding circle, compared to 5 in the men's game. Boundaries are also smaller in the women's game, with the rules dictating that they should be between 60 and 70 yards, compared to 65 and 90 yards in the men's game.

== International ==
Women's Twenty20 Internationals have been played since 2004. In January 2018, the ICC granted international status to all matches between associate nations. Subsequently, they created a T20I rankings system which were launched in October 2018. As of April 2025, 93 nations have played WT20Is.

== Domestic T20 leagues ==
The following is a list of the premier T20 domestic competition in full member countries.

Nations	Tournament	Period	Current Trophy Holder
Australia	Women's Big Bash League	2015–present	Adelaide Strikers
England	Charlotte Edwards Cup	2021–present	The Blaze
India	Women's Premier League	2023–present	Mumbai Indians
Ireland	Women's Super Series	2015–present	Scorchers
New Zealand	Women's Super Smash	2007–present	Wellington Blaze
Pakistan	PCB Women's Twenty20 Tournament	2020–present	PCB Blasters
South Africa	Women's T20 Super League	2019–present	No overall winner
Sri Lanka	Women's Invitation T20 Tournament	2022–present	Sri Lanka Navy Sports Club
(Cricket West Indies) West Indies	Twenty20 Blaze	2012–present	Jamaica
(Cricket West Indies) West Indies	Women's Caribbean Premier League	2022–present	Barbados Royals
Zimbabwe	Women's T20 Cup	2020–present	Mountaineers

== See also ==
- Twenty20
- Women's Twenty20 International
- List of T20 cricket competitions
