= India women's cricket team in Australia in 2025–26 =

International cricket tour

| | Australia | India |
- Dates: 15 February – 9 March 2026
| Captains | Alyssa Healy (Test and ODIs); Sophie Molineux (T20Is) | Harmanpreet Kaur |
- Player of the series: Annabel Sutherland (Aus)

Test series
- Result: Australia won the 1-match series 1–0
| Most runs | Annabel Sutherland (129) | Pratika Rawal (81) |
| Most wickets | Lucy Hamilton (6); Annabel Sutherland (6) | Sayali Satghare (4) |

One Day International series
- Results: Australia won the 3-match series 3–0
| Most runs | Alyssa Healy (214) | Harmanpreet Kaur (132) |
| Most wickets | Alana King (7) | Shree Charani (4); Deepti Sharma (4) |

Twenty20 International series
- Results: India won the 3-match series 2–1
| Most runs | Georgia Voll (116) | Smriti Mandhana (129) |
| Most wickets | Sophie Molineux (4); Annabel Sutherland (4) | Arundhati Reddy (8) |

Series points
- Australia 12, India 4

The India women's cricket team toured Australia in February and March 2026 to play the Australia women's cricket team. The tour consisted of one Test, three One Day International (ODI) and three Twenty20 International (T20I) matches. In March 2025, the Cricket Australia (CA) confirmed the fixtures for the tour, as a part of the 2025 home international season. Australia won the Test match and ODI series, while India won the T20I series.

In September 2025, the third ODI was shifted from Melbourne to Hobart due to floodlight issues in Melbourne. Shadow Minister Evan Mulholland raised the issue in Victorian Parliament on 3 February 2026, criticizing the Victorian government for its failure to secure even a single match for Victoria.

== Squads ==
| Australia | | | India | | |
| Test | ODIs | T20Is | Test | ODIs | T20Is |
|---|---|---|---|---|---|
| Alyssa Healy (c, wk); ~~Sophie Molineux (vc)~~; Darcie Brown; Maitlan Brown; Ashleigh Gardner; ~~Kim Garth~~; Lucy Hamilton; Alana King; Phoebe Litchfield; Beth Mooney (wk); Tahlia McGrath; Ellyse Perry; Annabel Sutherland; Rachel Trenaman; Georgia Voll; Georgia Wareham | Alyssa Healy (c, wk); Sophie Molineux (vc); Darcie Brown; Nicola Carey; Ashleigh Gardner; ~~Kim Garth~~; Lucy Hamilton; Alana King; Phoebe Litchfield; Beth Mooney (wk); Tahlia McGrath; ~~Ellyse Perry~~; Megan Schutt; Annabel Sutherland; Georgia Voll; Georgia Wareham | Sophie Molineux (c); Ashleigh Gardner (vc); Tahlia McGrath (vc); Darcie Brown; Nicola Carey; Kim Garth; Grace Harris; Phoebe Litchfield; Beth Mooney (wk); Ellyse Perry; Megan Schutt; Annabel Sutherland; Georgia Voll; Georgia Wareham | Harmanpreet Kaur (c); Smriti Mandhana (vc); Uma Chetry (wk); Harleen Deol; Kranti Gaud; Kashvee Gautam; Richa Ghosh (wk); Amanjot Kaur; Sneh Rana; Pratika Rawal; Jemimah Rodrigues; Sayali Satghare; Deepti Sharma; Vaishnavi Sharma; ~~Renuka Thakur~~; Shafali Verma | Harmanpreet Kaur (c); Smriti Mandhana (vc); Shree Charani; Uma Chetry (wk); Harleen Deol; Kranti Gaud; Kashvee Gautam; Richa Ghosh (wk); ~~Gunalan Kamalini~~ (wk); Amanjot Kaur; Sneh Rana; Pratika Rawal; Jemimah Rodrigues; Deepti Sharma; Vaishnavi Sharma; Renuka Thakur; Shafali Verma | Harmanpreet Kaur (c); Smriti Mandhana (vc); Shree Charani; Uma Chetry (wk); Bharti Fulmali; Kranti Gaud; Richa Ghosh (wk); ~~Gunalan Kamalini~~ (wk); Amanjot Kaur; Shreyanka Patil; Sneh Rana; Arundhati Reddy; Jemimah Rodrigues; Deepti Sharma; Vaishnavi Sharma; Renuka Thakur; Shafali Verma |

On 24 January, Gunalan Kamalini was ruled out of the ODI and T20I squads due to shoulder injury, and was replaced by Uma Chetry. On 17 February, Pratika Rawal was added to the ODI squad. On 3 March, Renuka Thakur was rested for the one-off Test match and was replaced by Kashvee Gautam.

On 24 February, Ellyse Perry and Kim Garth were ruled out of the ODI series due to quad injuries, and were replaced by Lucy Hamilton and Megan Schutt. On 27 February, Sophie Molineux was ruled out of the remainder of ODI series and one-off Test match due to lower back pain. On 2 March, Garth was also ruled out of the Test match, with Rachel Trenaman and Maitlan Brown were added into the squad.

== Tour match ==
13 February 2026
19:00 (N)
Scorecard

| Governor General XI (Australia); 8/120 (20 overs) | v | India; 5/121 (17.3 overs) |
| Sianna Ginger 40* (31); Arundhati Reddy 2/15 (4 overs) | | Smriti Mandhana 36 (29); Tess Flintoff 1/5 (2 overs) |

India won by 5 wickets
North Sydney Oval, Sydney
Umpires: Kate Holloman and Lauren McGill

- Governor General XI won the toss and elected to bat.

== T20I series ==
=== 1st T20I ===
15 February 2026
19:15 (N)
Scorecard

| Australia; 133 (18 overs) | v | India; 1/50 (5.1 overs) |
| Georgia Wareham 30 (19); Arundhati Reddy 4/22 (4 overs) | | Shafali Verma 21 (11); Sophie Molineux 1/13 (1 over) |

India won by 21 runs (DLS method)
Sydney Cricket Ground, Sydney
Umpires: Kim Cotton (NZ) and Phillip Gillespie (Aus)
Player of the match: Arundhati Reddy (Ind)

- India won the toss and elected to field.
- No further play was possible due to rain.
- Sophie Molineux captained Australia in T20Is for the first time.
- Series points: India 2, Australia 0.

India won by 21 runs via the DLS method, with Arundhati Reddy taking four wickets.

=== 2nd T20I ===
19 February 2026
19:15 (N)
Scorecard

| Australia; 5/163 (20 overs) | v | India; 9/144 (20 overs) |
| Georgia Voll 88 (57); Arundhati Reddy 2/30 (4 overs) | | Harmanpreet Kaur 36 (30); Ashleigh Gardner 3/22 (4 overs) |

Australia won by 19 runs
Manuka Oval, Canberra
Umpires: Kim Cotton (NZ) and Eloise Sheridan (Aus)
Player of the match: Georgia Voll (Aus)

- India won the toss and elected to field.
- Harmanpreet Kaur (Ind) became the most capped international player in women's cricket.
- Series points: Australia 2, India 0.

Australia levelled the series with a 19-run victory, led by Georgia Voll's 88.

=== 3rd T20I ===
21 February 2026
18:45 (N)
Scorecard

| India; 6/176 (20 overs) | v | Australia; 9/159 (20 overs) |
| Smriti Mandhana 82 (55); Annabel Sutherland 2/34 (4 overs) | | Ashleigh Gardner 57 (45); Shreyanka Patil 3/22 (4 overs) |

India won by 17 runs
Adelaide Oval, Adelaide
Umpires: Phillip Gillespie (Aus) and Eloise Sheridan (Aus)
Player of the match: Smriti Mandhana (Ind)

- India won the toss and elected to bat.
- Ellyse Perry (Aus) played in her 350th international match.
- Series points: India 2, Australia 0.

India secured the series with a 17-run win, with Smriti Mandhana scoring 82.

== ODI series ==
=== 1st ODI ===
24 February 2026
13:50 (D/N)
Scorecard

| India; 214 (48.3 overs) | v | Australia; 4/217 (38.2 overs) |
| Smriti Mandhana 58 (68); Ashleigh Gardner 3/33 (7 overs) | | Beth Mooney 76 (79); Shree Charani 2/41 (9 overs) |

Australia won by 6 wickets
Allan Border Field, Brisbane
Umpires: Kim Cotton (NZ) and Shawn Craig (Aus)
Player of the match: Beth Mooney (Aus)

- India won the toss and elected to bat.
- Beth Mooney (Aus) scored her 3,000th run in ODIs and 7,000th run in international cricket.
- Series points: Australia 2, India 0.

Australia won by 6 wickets, with Beth Mooney scoring 76.

=== 2nd ODI ===
27 February 2026
14:50 (D/N)
Scorecard

| India; 251/9 (50 overs) | v | Australia; 252/5 (36.1 overs) |
| Harmanpreet Kaur 54 (70); Annabel Sutherland 2/37 (7 overs) | | Georgia Voll 101 (82); Deepti Sharma 2/32 (5 overs) |

Australia won by 5 wickets
Bellerive Oval, Hobart
Umpires: Shawn Craig (Aus) and Claire Polosak (Aus)
Player of the match: Georgia Voll (Aus)

- India won the toss and elected to bat.
- Vaishnavi Sharma (Ind) made her ODI debut.
- Series points: Australia 2, India 0.

Australia won by 5 wickets, with Georgia Voll scoring a century.

=== 3rd ODI ===
1 March 2026
14:50 (D/N)
Scorecard

| Australia; 409/7 (50 overs) | v | India; 224 (45.1 overs) |
| Alyssa Healy 158 (98); Sneh Rana 2/66 (10 overs) | | Sneh Rana 44 (74); Alana King 4/33 (10 overs) |

Australia won by 185 runs
Bellerive Oval, Hobart
Umpires: Kim Cotton (NZ) and Claire Polosak (Aus)
Player of the match: Alyssa Healy (Aus)

- India won the toss and elected to field.
- Lucy Hamilton (Aus) made her ODI debut.
- Series points: Australia 2, India 0.

Australia completed a 3–0 sweep with a 185-run victory, led by Alyssa Healy's 158.

== Only Test ==
6–8 March 2026 (D/N)
Scorecard

| India | v | Australia |
| 198 (62.4 overs); Jemimah Rodrigues 52 (84); Annabel Sutherland 4/46 (17 overs) | | 323 (90.4 overs); Annabel Sutherland 129 (171); Sayali Satghare 4/50 (18.4 overs) |
| 149 (48.2 overs); Pratika Rawal 63 (137); Lucy Hamilton 3/32 (8 overs) | | 28/0 (4.3 overs); Georgia Voll 16* (13) |

Australia won by 10 wickets
WACA Ground, Perth
Umpires: Donovan Koch (Aus) and Eloise Sheridan (Aus)
Player of the match: Annabel Sutherland (Aus)

- Australia won the toss and elected to field.
- Lucy Hamilton (Aus), Kranti Gaud, Kashvee Gautam, Pratika Rawal and Sayali Satghare (Ind) all made their Test debuts.
- Ellyse Perry (Aus) scored her 1,000th run in Tests, and also became the highest run-scorer in Tests for Australia, going past Karen Rolton.
- Alyssa Healy (Aus) played in her last international match.
- Series points: Australia 4, India 0.

Australia won by 10 wickets, with Annabel Sutherland scoring 129 and taking four wickets.
