= 2026 Women's Twenty20 Asia Cup final =

International cricket match

- Match programme cover
- Event: 2026 Women's Twenty20 Asia Cup
India	Sri Lanka
183/5	111
20 overs	20 overs
- India won by 72 runs
- Date: 13 September 2026 18:30 UTC+4
- Venue: Dubai International Cricket Stadium, Dubai
- Player of the match: Shafali Verma (Ind)
- Umpires: Saleema Imtiaz (Pak) and Shathira Jakir (Ban)

The 2026 Women's Twenty20 Asia Cup final was a Women's Twenty20 International (WT20I) cricket match played at the Dubai International Cricket Stadium in Dubai, United Arab Emirates, on 13 September 2026 to determine the winner of the 2026 Women's Twenty20 Asia Cup.

It was played between India and Sri Lanka. India won the toss and elected to bat first; India scored 183/5 in their innings. In the second innings, Sri Lanka were all out for 111. India won their fourth title in the T20 format and overall the eighth title in the Asia Cup.

== Background ==
The 2026 Women's Twenty20 Asia Cup was the sixth edition of the Women's Twenty20 Asia Cup and overall the tenth Women's Asia Cup; a biennial international cricket competition in Women's Twenty20 International (WT20I) format, organised by the Asian Cricket Council (ACC). It was inaugurated in 2004 as an annual Women's One Day International (WODI) competition and was held as such until 2006. It was converted to a biennial tournament from then on and since 2012, has been held in the WT20I format. In August 2026, the ACC announced that the tournament would be held at Dubai International Cricket Stadium in Dubai, United Arab Emirates from 28 August to 13 September. This would be the first time the UAE hosted the tournament.

This was India's sixth consecutive T20 final after being winners in 2012, 2016 and 2022 and runners-up in 2018 and 2024, while it was Sri Lanka's third consecutive T20 final after being winners in 2024 and runners-up in 2022. India and Sri Lanka had previously played each other in two T20 finals, with India winning once and Sri Lanka once. Both teams were also finalists in all four of the WODI editions in 2004, 2005, 2006 and 2008 with India winning on all four occasions.

== Road to the final ==
=== Overview ===
- Sources: Cricinfo

India				vs	Sri Lanka
Opponent	Date	Result	Points	Match	Opponent	Date	Result	Points
Group A				Group stage	Group B
Thailand	30 August 2026	Won	2	1	United Arab Emirates	29 August 2026	Won	2
Hong Kong	3 September 2026	Won	4	2	Indonesia	2 September 2026	Won	4
Pakistan	5 September 2026	Won	6	3	Bangladesh	6 September 2026	Won	6
Semi-final 1				Knockout stage	Semi-final 2
Bangladesh	10 September 2026	Won		SF	Pakistan	11 September 2026	Won
2026 Women's Twenty20 Asia Cup final

=== India ===
India began their campaign with a victory against Thailand. They went onto defeat Hong Kong and rivals Pakistan to finish the group stage as winners of Group A. India then defeated Bangladesh in the semi-final 1 to qualify for their record sixth T20 final.

=== Sri Lanka ===
Sri Lanka began their campaign with a victory against the hosts, United Arab Emirates. They went onto defeat Indonesia and Bangladesh to finish the group stage as winners of Group B. Sri Lanka then defeated Pakistan in the semi-final 2 to qualify for their consecutive third T20 final.

== Match ==
=== Match officials ===
On 13 September 2026, the ACC named Pakistan's Saleema Imtiaz and Bangladesh's Shathira Jakir as the on-field umpires, along with Bangladesh's Rokeya Sultana as the third umpire, Pakistan's Humaira Farah as the reserve umpire, and Bangladesh's Supriya Das as match referee.

=== Team and toss ===
Indian captain Harmanpreet Kaur won the toss and elected to bat first. She also announced that Gunalan Kamalini would replace Pratika Rawal in their team, while Sri Lankan captain Chamari Athapaththu announced that Vishmi Gunaratne would replace Sanjana Kavindi in their team.

- India: Smriti Mandhana, Shafali Verma, Harmanpreet Kaur (c), Richa Ghosh (wk), Deepti Sharma, Bharti Fulmali, Gunalan Kamalini, Prema Rawat, Shree Charani, Kranti Gaud, Nandani Sharma
- Sri Lanka: Imesha Dulani, Chamari Athapaththu (c), Vishmi Gunaratne, Harshitha Samarawickrama, Nilakshi de Silva, Kavisha Dilhari, Hasini Perera, Kaushini Nuthyangana (wk), Sugandika Kumari, Mithali Ayodhya, Chamudi Praboda

=== Match scorecard ===
13 September 2026
18:30 UTC+4 (N)
Scorecard

India; 183/5 (20 overs)	v	Sri Lanka; 111 (20 overs)
Shafali Verma 68 (39); Mithali Ayodhya 1/33 (4 overs)		Chamari Athapaththu 36 (32); Shree Charani 4/20 (4 overs)

India won by 72 runs
Dubai International Cricket Stadium, Dubai
Umpires: Saleema Imtiaz (Pak) and Shathira Jakir (Ban)
Player of the match: Shafali Verma (Ind)

- India won the toss and elected to bat.
- India became the first team to win four T20 Asia Cup titles and overall eight Asia Cup titles.

=== India innings ===
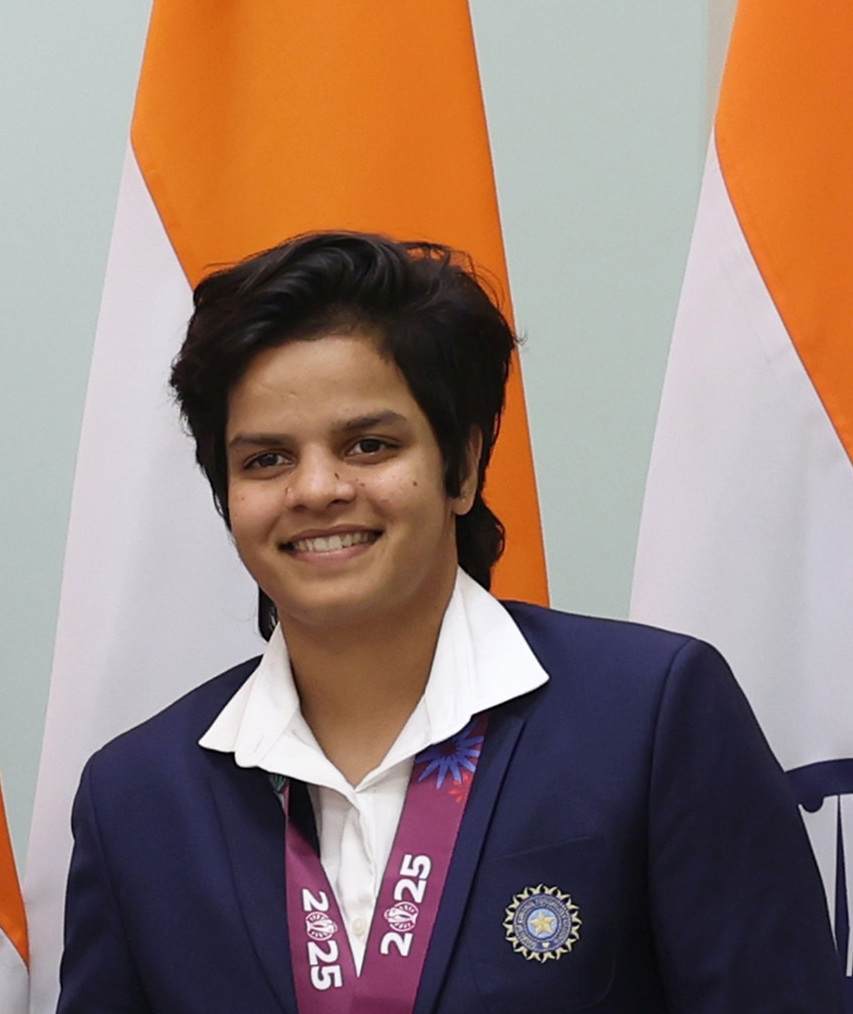
Shafali Verma scored 68 runs and took a wicket for India in the final and received the player of the match award.

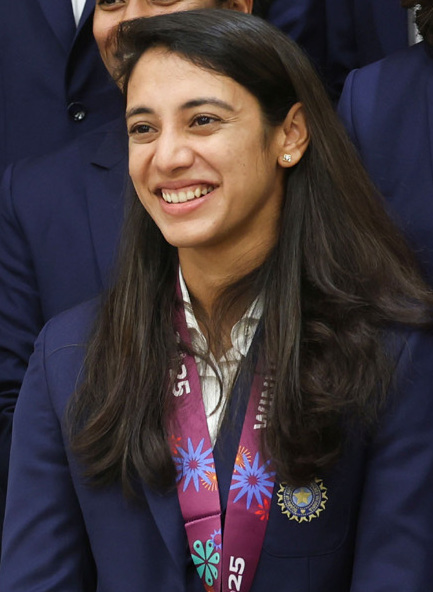
Smriti Mandhana scored 59 runs for India in the final.

Opting to bat first, Indian openers Mandhana and Shafali scored 59 and 68 runs respectively from 39 balls each to put together a 129-run opening partnership before both batters were dismissed in the fourteenth and the thirteenth overs respectively. Ghosh was dismissed for 17 runs in the 18th over. Indian captain Kaur and Deepti were both dismissed in the 19th over, leaving India at 167 runs. In the final over, Gunalan Kamalini scored 15 runs in 5 balls to take India to a total of 183 runs for the loss of 5 wickets. Shafali was the highest run-scorer for India while Praboda, Ayodhya and captain Athapaththu picked up a wicket each for Sri Lanka.

India batting
Player	Status	Runs	Balls	4s	6s	Strike rate
Smriti Mandhana	run out (Dilhari/†Nuthyangana)	59	39	5	3	151.28
Shafali Verma	c Athapaththu b Praboda	68	39	9	2	174.35
Harmanpreet Kaur	c sub (K Kavindi) b Ayodhya	14	14	1	0	100.00
Richa Ghosh	c Dilhari b Athapaththu	17	13	1	1	130.76
Deepti Sharma	run out (Samarawickrama/Ayodhya)	5	7	0	0	71.42
Bharti Fulmali	not out	2	3	0	0	66.67
Gunalan Kamalini	not out	15	5	1	1	300.00
Prema Rawat	did not bat					
Shree Charani	did not bat					
Kranti Gaud	did not bat					
Nandani Sharma	did not bat					
Extras	(lb 1, w 2)	3				
Total	5 wickets; 20 overs	183		17	7	RR: 9.15

Fall of wickets: 1/129 (Shafali, 12.5 ov), 2/132 (Mandhana, 13.4 ov), 3/160 (Ghosh, 17.1 ov), 4/166 (Kaur, 18.4 ov), 5/167 (Deepti, 18.5 ov)

Sri Lanka bowling
Bowler	Overs	Maidens	Runs	Wickets	Econ	Wides	NBs
Mithali Ayodhya	4	0	33	1	8.25	0	0
Kavisha Dilhari	3	0	29	0	9.66	1	0
Sugandika Kumari	4	0	31	0	7.75	0	0
Chamari Athapaththu	4	0	34	1	8.50	0	0
Chamudi Praboda	4	0	40	1	10.00	0	0
Nilakshi de Silva	1	0	15	0	15.00	1	0

=== Sri Lanka innings ===
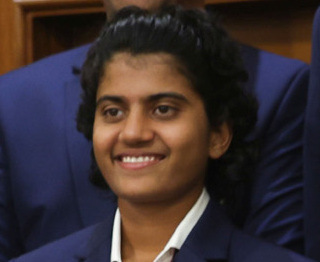
Shree Charani took 4 wickets for India in the final.

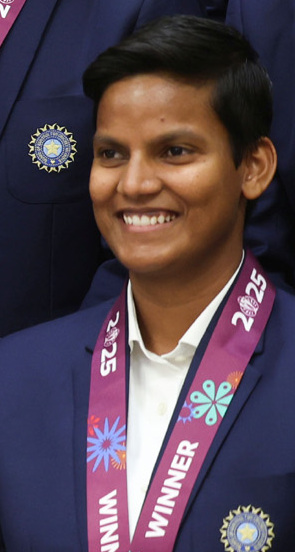
Deepti Sharma took 3 wickets for India in the final.

Chasing the target of 184, Sri Lanka lost their opener Dulani in the first over. Athapaththu and Gunaratne 36 runs from 32 balls and 20 runs from 22 balls to put together a 58-run partnership before both were dismissed in the tenth over bowled by Sharma. Samarawickrama was dismissed in the 14th over for 9 runs. Both Nilakshi and Dilhari were dismissed in the 16th over, bowled by Charani, leaving Sri Lanka at 101. The remaining batters were all dismissed for single-digit scores, bundling out Sri Lanka for 111 runs. Athapaththu was the highest run-scorer for Sri Lanka, while Charani picked up four wickets and Deepti picked up three wickets for India. Shafali also took a wicket and received the player of the match award for her all-round performance with the bat and ball.

Sri Lanka batting
Player	Status	Runs	Balls	4s	6s	Strike rate
Imesha Dulani	b Gaud	4	4	1	0	100.00
Chamari Athapaththu	st †Ghosh b Deepti	36	32	4	2	112.50
Vishmi Gunaratne	b Deepti	20	22	2	0	90.90
Harshitha Samarawickrama	c & b Charani	9	14	1	0	64.28
Nilakshi de Silva	c Kamalini b Charani	22	16	1	0	137.50
Kavisha Dilhari	c Nandani b Charani	7	5	1	0	140.00
Hasini Perera	c Charani b Shafali	1	3	0	0	33.33
Kaushini Nuthyangana	b Deepti	9	14	1	0	64.28
Sugandika Kumari	c Nandani b Charani	1	7	0	0	14.28
Mithali Ayodhya	st †Ghosh b Rawat	0	3	0	0	0.00
Chamudi Praboda	not out	0	0	0	0	-
Extras	(b 2)	2				
Total	10 wickets; 20 overs	111		11	2	RR: 5.55

Fall of wickets: 1/4 (Dulani, 0.4 ov), 2/62 (Athapaththu, 9.3 ov), 3/63 (Gunaratne, 9.6 ov), 4/86 (Samarawickrama, 13.5 ov), 5/100 (Dilhari, 15.2 ov), 6/101 (Nilakshi, 15.4 ov), 7/103 (Hasini, 16.4 ov), 8/104 (Sugandika, 17.5 ov), 9/107 (Ayodhya, 18.6 ov), 10/111 (Nuthyangana, 19.6 ov)

India bowling
Bowler	Overs	Maidens	Runs	Wickets	Econ	Wides	NBs
Kranti Gaud	2	0	8	1	4.00	0	0
Nandani Sharma	3	0	17	0	5.66	0	0
Shafali Verma	4	0	23	1	5.75	0	0
Shree Charani	4	1	20	4	5.00	0	0
Deepti Sharma	4	0	19	3	4.75	0	0
Prema Rawat	3	0	22	1	7.33	0	0

== Aftermath ==
This was India's fourth T20 Asia Cup victory after 2012, 2016 and 2022; and overall eighth Asia Cup victory including the four WODI titles in 2004, 2005, 2006 and 2008. After the match, the ACC's chairman Mohsin Naqvi, who is also the chairman of the Pakistan Cricket Board and the interior minister of Pakistan, presented medals to the runners-up, Sri Lanka. However, India refused to accept the trophy from him due to the India–Pakistan political issues. This is the second time of such occurrence, after the 2025 Asia Cup where the India men's team also refused to accept the trophy from Naqvi in the aftermath of the Pahalgam terror attack and the subsequent 2025 India–Pakistan conflict, and Naqvi walked away with the trophy.

== Broadcasting ==
The final match was broadcast live in India through the Sony Sports Network and the SonyLIV platform. In Sri Lanka, the match was broadcast on TV1 along with the Sony Sports Network.

== See also ==
- International cricket in 2026
- Associate international cricket in 2026
