= 2025 Women's Premier League (cricket) final =

2025 WPL cricket tournament final in India

2025 Women's Premier League Final
- Event: 2025 Women's Premier League
Mumbai Indians	Delhi Capitals
149/7	141/9
20 overs	20 overs
- Mumbai Indians won by 8 runs
- Date: 15 March 2025
- Venue: Brabourne Stadium, Mumbai
- Player of the match: Harmanpreet Kaur (Mumbai Indians)
- Umpires: Ankita Guha and Anish Sahasrabudhe

The 2025 Women's Premier League Final was a Women's Twenty20 match played at the Brabourne Stadium in Mumbai on 15 March 2025 to determine the winner of the 2025 Women's Premier League. It was played between the table toppers of the 2025 season, Delhi Capitals and the winner of 2025's Eliminator, Mumbai Indians. It was the second time that Delhi and Mumbai played a WPL final against each other, after the 2023 final.

== Background ==
On 16 January 2025, the BCCI announced the schedule for the 2025 season of the Women's Premier League with matches played across four venues - Bengaluru, Lucknow, Mumbai and Vadodara. Vadodara, Bengaluru and Lucknow hosted the first three rounds of the league stage at the Kotambi Stadium, the M. Chinnaswamy Stadium and the Ekana Cricket Stadium respectively and Mumbai hosted the final round along with the playoffs at the Brabourne Stadium.

== Road to the final ==
Delhi Capitals
vs
Mumbai Indians
League Stage
Opponent
Scorecard
Result
Points
Match No.
Opponent
Scorecard
Result
Points
Mumbai Indians
15 February 2025
Won
2
1
Delhi Capitals
15 February 2025
Lost
0
Royal Challengers Bengaluru
17 February 2025
Lost
2
2
Gujarat Giants
18 February 2025
Won
2
UP Warriorz
19 February 2025
Won
4
3
Royal Challengers Bengaluru
21 February 2025
Won
4
UP Warriorz
22 February 2025
Lost
4
4
UP Warriorz
26 February 2025
Won
6
Gujarat Giants
25 February 2025
Won
6
5
Delhi Capitals
28 February 2025
Lost
6
Mumbai Indians
28 February 2025
Won
8
6
UP Warriorz
6 March 2025
Won
8
Royal Challengers Bengaluru
1 March 2025
Won
10
7
Gujarat Giants
10 March 2025
Won
10
Gujarat Giants
7 March 2025
Lost
10
8
Royal Challengers Bengaluru
11 March 2025
Lost
10

League progression
Team	Group matches								Playoffs	
Team	1	2	3	4	5	6	7	8	E	F
Delhi Capitals	2	2	4	4	6	8	10	10		L
Mumbai Indians	0	2	4	6	6	8	10	10	W	W

Win	Loss	No result

- Note: The total points at the end of each group match are listed.
- Note: Click on the points (group matches) or W/L (playoffs) to see the match summary.
Playoff stage

Eliminator

Final

1
Delhi Capitals
141/9 (20 overs)

2
Mumbai Indians
213/4 (20 overs)

EW
Mumbai Indians
149/7 (20 overs)

3
Gujarat Giants
166 (19.2 overs)

Qualified for the finals
Elimator

Opponent
Scorecard
Result
9
Gujarat Giants
13 March 2025
Won
2025 Women's Premier League final

== Match ==
=== Match officials ===
- On-field umpires: Ankita Guha and Anish Sahasrabudhe
- Third umpire: Vrinda Rathi
- Reserve umpire: Kaushik Gandhi
- Match referee: G. S. Lakshmi
- Toss: Delhi Capitals won the toss and elected to field.

=== Summary ===
Final
15 March 2025
20:00 (N)
Scorecard

Mumbai Indians; 149/7 (20 overs)	v	Delhi Capitals; 141/9 (20 overs)
Harmanpreet Kaur 66 (44); Marizanne Kapp 2/11 (4 overs)		Marizanne Kapp 40 (26); Nat Sciver-Brunt 3/30 (4 overs)

Mumbai Indians won by 8 runs
Brabourne Stadium, Mumbai
Umpires: Ankita Guha and Anish Sahasrabudhe
Player of the match: Harmanpreet Kaur (Mumbai Indians)

- Delhi Capitals won the toss and elected to field.

=== Scorecard ===
Match scorecard

1st innings

Mumbai Indians batting
Player	Status	Runs	Balls	4s	6s	Strike rate
Yastika Bhatia	c Rodrigues b Kapp	8	14	1	0	57.14
Hayley Matthews	b Kapp	3	10	0	0	30.00
Nat Sciver-Brunt	c Mani b Charani	30	28	4	0	107.14
Harmanpreet Kaur	c Kapp b Sutherland	66	44	9	2	150.00
Amelia Kerr	c Verma b Jonassen	2	3	0	0	66.66
Sajeevan Sajana	lbw b Jonassen	0	2	0	0	0.00
G Kamalini	st †Bryce b Charani	10	7	0	1	142.85
Amanjot Kaur	not out	14	7	2	0	200.00
Sanskriti Gupta	not out	8	5	1	0	160.00
Shabnim Ismail	did not bat					
Saika Ishaque	did not bat					
Extras	(b 1, w 7)	8				
Total	(7 wickets; 20 overs)	149		17	3	RR: 7.45

Fall of wickets: 5/1 (Matthews, 3 ov), 14/2 (Bhatia, 4.3 ov), 103/3 (Sciver-Brunt, 14.5 ov), 112/4 (Kerr, 15.5 ov), 112/5 (Sajana, 16 ov), 118/6 (Harmanpreet, 17.1 ov), 132/7 (Kamalini, 18.4 ov)

Delhi Capitals bowling
Bowler	Overs	Maidens	Runs	Wickets	Econ	Wides	NBs
Marizanne Kapp	4	0	11	2	2.75	0	0
Shikha Pandey	4	0	29	0	7.25	0	0
Annabel Sutherland	4	0	29	1	7.25	1	0
Jess Jonassen	3	0	26	2	8.66	0	0
Shree Charani	4	0	43	2	10.75	2	0
Minnu Mani	1	0	10	0	10.00	0	0

2nd innings

Delhi Capitals batting
Player	Status	Runs	Balls	4s	6s	Strike rate
Meg Lanning	b Sciver-Brunt	13	9	2	0	144.44
Shafali Verma	lbw b Ismail	4	9	0	0	44.44
Jess Jonassen	c †Bhatia b Kerr	13	15	2	0	86.66
Jemimah Rodrigues	c & b Kerr	30	21	4	0	142.85
Annabel Sutherland	st †Bhatia b Ishaque	2	5	0	0	40.00
Marizanne Kapp	c Matthews b Sciver-Brunt	40	26	5	2	153.84
Sarah Bryce	run out (Gupta/†Bhatia)	5	5	0	0	100.00
Niki Prasad	not out	25	23	1	1	108.69
Shikha Pandey	b Sciver-Brunt	0	1	0	0	0.00
Minnu Mani	c Sajana b Matthews	4	2	1	0	200.00
Shree Charani	not out	3	4	0	0	75.00
Extras	(lb 1, w 1)	2				
Total	(9 wickets; 20 overs)	141		15	3	RR: 7.05

Fall of wickets: 15/1 (Lanning, 2 ov), 17/2 (Verma, 3 ov), 37/3 (Jonassen, 6.2 ov), 44/4 (Sutherland, 8 ov), 66/5 (Rodrigues, 10.4 ov), 83/6 (Bryce, 12.5 ov), 123/7 (Kapp, 17.4 ov), 123/8 (Pandey, 17.5 ov), 128/9 (Mani, 18.2 ov)

Mumbai Indians bowling
Bowler	Overs	Maidens	Runs	Wickets	Econ	Wides	NBs
Shabnim Ismail	4	0	15	1	3.75	0	0
Nat Sciver-Brunt	4	0	30	3	7.50	0	0
Hayley Matthews	4	0	37	1	9.25	1	0
Amelia Kerr	4	0	25	2	6.25	0	0
Saika Ishaque	4	0	33	1	8.25	0	0
