= 2025 Women's Cricket World Cup final =

Women's Cricket World Cup final

2025 ICC Women's World Cup Final
- Event: 2025 Women's Cricket World Cup
India	South Africa
(India)	(South Africa)
298/7	246
(50 overs)	45.3 overs
- India won by 52 runs
- Date: 2 November 2025
- Venue: DY Patil Stadium, Navi Mumbai
- Player of the match: Shafali Verma (Ind)
- Umpires: Eloise Sheridan (Aus) and Jacqueline Williams (WI)
- Attendance: 39,555

The 2025 ICC Women's Cricket World Cup final was a Women's One Day International (WODI) cricket match played at the DY Patil Stadium in Navi Mumbai on 2 November 2025 to decide the winner of the 2025 Women's Cricket World Cup. It was played between host nation India and South Africa. This was the second time that Women's Cricket World Cup final was held in the Mumbai Metropolitan Region after 2013, and the first in Navi Mumbai.

India defeated South Africa by 52 runs to win their maiden World Cup.

== Background ==
The 2025 Women's Cricket World Cup was the thirteenth edition of the Women's Cricket World Cup, a quadrennial World Cup for Women's cricket in One Day International (ODI) format organised by the International Cricket Council (ICC). In July 2022, the ICC announced India as the host nation for the tournament, as part of the 2024–2027 ICC Women's Hosts Cycle. However, following an agreement between the BCCI and PCB, the ICC confirmed that matches between India or Pakistan at ICC events in 2024–2027 will be played at neutral venues when either of them are the hosts.

On 2 June, the ICC announced the venues for the tournament, with the M. Chinnaswamy Stadium in Bengaluru named as the venue for the final. However, on 22 August, a revised list of venues was released, in which the DY Patil Stadium in Navi Mumbai replaced Bengaluru as the final venue.

This was South Africa's maiden final of the Women's World Cup, while India reached their third final, having been runners-up on both the occasions (2005 against Australia and 2017 against England). It was also the first Women's World Cup final that featured neither Australia nor England.

== Route to the final ==
Each team played the other seven teams in the league stage; the top four teams advanced to the semi-finals.

India				vs	South Africa
Opponent	Date	Result	Points	League stage	Opponent	Date	Result	Points
Sri Lanka	30 September 2025	Won by 59 runs (DLS)	2	Match 1	England	3 October 2025	Lost by 10 wickets	0
Pakistan	5 October 2025	Won by 88 runs	4	Match 2	New Zealand	6 October 2025	Won by 6 wickets	2
South Africa	9 October 2025	Lost by 3 wickets	4	Match 3	India	9 October 2025	Won by 3 wickets	4
Australia	12 October 2025	Lost by 3 wickets	4	Match 4	Bangladesh	13 October 2025	Won by 3 wickets	6
England	19 October 2025	Lost by 4 runs	4	Match 5	Sri Lanka	17 October 2025	Won by 10 wickets (DLS)	8
New Zealand	23 October 2025	Won by 53 runs (DLS)	6	Match 6	Pakistan	21 October 2025	Won by 150 runs (DLS)	10
Bangladesh	26 October 2025	No result	7	Match 7	Australia	25 October 2025	Lost by 7 wickets	10
Semi-final 2				Knockout stage	Semi-final 1
Australia	30 October 2025	Won by 5 wickets		SF	England	29 October 2025	Won by 125 runs
Source: ICC

== Match ==
=== Match officials ===
On 31 October 2025, the ICC announced the match officials for the final.

- On-field umpires: Eloise Sheridan (Aus) and Jacqueline Williams (WI)
- TV umpire: Sue Redfern (Eng)
- Reserve umpire: Nimali Perera (SL)
- Match referee: Michell Pereira (SL)

=== Team and toss ===
South African captain Laura Wolvaardt won the toss and elected to field first. Both teams were unchanged from their respective semi-final matches.

=== Match details ===
Final
2 November 2025
15:00 (D/N)
Scorecard

India; 298/7 (50 overs)	v	South Africa; 246 (45.3 overs)
Shafali Verma 87 (78); Ayabonga Khaka 3/58 (9 overs)		Laura Wolvaardt 101 (98); Deepti Sharma 5/39 (9.3 overs)

India won by 52 runs
DY Patil Stadium, Navi Mumbai
Umpires: Eloise Sheridan (Aus) and Jacqueline Williams (WI)
Player of the match: Shafali Verma (Ind)

- South Africa won the toss and elected to field.
- Laura Wolvaardt (SA) became the first captain to score a century in the Women's World Cup final.
- India won their maiden World Cup title.

Match scorecard

1st innings

India batting
Player	Status	Runs	Balls	4s	6s	Strike rate
Smriti Mandhana	c †Jafta b Tryon	45	58	8	0	77.58
Shafali Verma	c Luus b Khaka	87	78	7	2	111.53
Jemimah Rodrigues	c Wolvaardt b Khaka	24	37	1	0	64.86
Harmanpreet Kaur	b Mlaba	20	29	2	0	68.96
Deepti Sharma	run out (Tryon/†Jafta)	58	58	3	1	100.00
Amanjot Kaur	c & b de Klerk	12	14	1	0	85.71
Richa Ghosh	c Dercksen b Khaka	34	24	3	2	141.66
Radha Yadav	not out	3	3	0	0	100.00
Kranti Goud	did not bat					
Shree Charani	did not bat					
Renuka Singh	did not bat					
Extras	(lb 2, nb 1, w 12)	15				
Total	(7 wickets; 50 overs)	298		25	5	RR: 5.96

Fall of wickets: 1/104 (Mandhana, 17.4 ov), 2/166 (Shafali, 27.5 ov), 3/171 (Rodrigues, 29.4 ov), 4/223 (Harmanpreet, 38.6 ov), 5/245 (Amanjot, 43.1 ov), 6/292 (Ghosh, 48.6 ov), 7/298 (Deepti, 49.6 ov)

South Africa bowling
Bowler	Overs	Maidens	Runs	Wickets	Econ	Wides	NBs
Marizanne Kapp	10	1	59	0	5.90	2	0
Ayabonga Khaka	9	0	58	3	6.44	3	1
Nonkululeko Mlaba	10	0	47	1	4.70	2	0
Nadine de Klerk	9	0	52	1	5.77	1	0
Suné Luus	5	0	34	0	6.80	0	0
Chloe Tryon	7	0	46	1	6.57	0	0

2nd innings

South Africa batting
Player	Status	Runs	Balls	4s	6s	Strike rate
Laura Wolvaardt	c Amanjot b Deepti	101	98	11	1	103.06
Tazmin Brits	run out (Amanjot)	23	35	2	1	65.71
Anneke Bosch	lbw b Charani	0	6	0	0	0.00
Suné Luus	c & b Shafali	25	31	4	0	80.64
Marizanne Kapp	c †Ghosh b Shafali	4	5	0	0	80.00
Sinalo Jafta	c Radha b Deepti	16	29	1	0	55.17
Annerie Dercksen	b Deepti	35	37	1	2	94.59
Chloe Tryon	lbw b Deepti	9	8	1	0	112.50
Nadine de Klerk	c Harmanpreet b Deepti	18	19	3	0	94.73
Ayabonga Khaka	run out (Deepti/†Ghosh)	1	7	0	0	14.28
Nonkululeko Mlaba	not out	0	0	0	0	–
Extras	(nb 2, w 12)	14				
Total	(all out; 45.3 overs)	246		23	4	RR: 5.40

Fall of wickets: 1/51 (Brits, 9.3 ov), 2/62 (Bosch, 11.5 ov), 3/114 (Luus, 20.2 ov), 4/123 (Kapp, 22.1 ov), 5/148 (Jafta, 29.3 ov), 6/209 (Dercksen, 39.3 ov), 7/220 (Wolvaardt, 41.1 ov), 8/221 (Tryon, 41.4 ov), 9/246 (Khaka, 44.6 ov), 10/246 (de Klerk, 45.3 ov)

India bowling
Bowler	Overs	Maidens	Runs	Wickets	Econ	Wides	NBs
Renuka Singh	8	0	28	0	3.50	2	0
Kranti Goud	3	0	16	0	5.33	1	0
Amanjot Kaur	4	0	34	0	8.50	0	0
Deepti Sharma	9.3	0	39	5	4.10	1	0
Shree Charani	9	0	48	1	5.33	3	1
Radha Yadav	5	0	45	0	9.00	0	1
Shafali Verma	7	0	36	2	5.14	0	0

== Aftermath ==
=== Post-match ===
This was India's maiden Women's World Cup title victory. Shafali Verma was awarded with the Player of the Match award while Deepti Sharma was awarded with the Player of the Tournament for her all-round performance throughout the tournament.

India further received a record $6.58 million and South Africa received $3.24 million as prize money from the ICC.

=== Celebrations ===
After India's historic victory the BCCI announced a cash reward of ₹51 crore for the players, coaching staff and support staff. Later, team India was felicitated by Prime Minister Narendra Modi on 5 November 2025 at his residence in New Delhi. On 6 November 2025, the team was felicitated by Indian President Droupadi Murmu at the Rashtrapati Bhavan.
