= Sri Lanka women's cricket team in India in 2025–26 =

International cricket tour

| | India | Sri Lanka |
- Dates: 21 – 30 December 2025
| Captains | Harmanpreet Kaur | Chamari Athapaththu |

Twenty20 International series
- Results: India won the 5-match series 5–0
| Most runs | Shafali Verma (241) | Hasini Perera (165) |
| Most wickets | Shree Charani (5); Deepti Sharma (5); Vaishnavi Sharma (5) | Kavisha Dilhari (5) |
- Player of the series: Shafali Verma (Ind)

The Sri Lanka women's cricket team toured India in December 2025 to play the India women's cricket team. The tour consisted of five Twenty20 International (T20I) matches. In November 2025, the Board of Control for Cricket in India (BCCI) confirmed the fixtures for the tour, as a part of the 2025–26 home international season.

The first two matches were played at the ACA–VDCA Cricket Stadium in Visakhapatnam while the final three matches were played at the Greenfield International Stadium in Thiruvananthapuram.

== Squads ==
| India | Sri Lanka |
|---|---|
| Harmanpreet Kaur (c); Smriti Mandhana (vc); Shree Charani; Harleen Deol; Kranti Gaud; Richa Ghosh (wk); Gunalan Kamalini (wk); Amanjot Kaur; Sneh Rana; Arundhati Reddy; Jemimah Rodrigues; Deepti Sharma; Vaishnavi Sharma; Renuka Singh; Shafali Verma | Chamari Athapaththu (c); Kavisha Dilhari; Imesha Dulani; Shashini Gimhani; Vishmi Gunaratne; Kawya Kavindi; Malki Madara; Nimasha Meepage; Kaushini Nuthyangana (wk); Hasini Perera; Inoka Ranaweera; Harshitha Samarawickrama; Rashmika Sewwandi; Malsha Shehani; Nilakshi de Silva |

== T20I series ==
=== 1st T20I ===
21 December 2025
19:00 (N)
Scorecard

| Sri Lanka; 121/6 (20 overs) | v | India; 122/2 (14.4 overs) |
| Vishmi Gunaratne 39 (43); Deepti Sharma 1/20 (4 overs) | | Jemimah Rodrigues 69* (44); Inoka Ranaweera 1/17 (3.4 overs) |

India won by 8 wickets
ACA–VDCA Cricket Stadium, Visakhapatnam
Umpires: Ankita Guha (Ind) and Gayathri Venugopalan (Ind)
Player of the match: Jemimah Rodrigues (Ind)

- India won the toss and elected to field.
- Vaishnavi Sharma (Ind) made her T20I debut.
- Harmanpreet Kaur (Ind) played in her 350th international match.
- Smriti Mandhana (Ind) scored her 4,000th run in T20Is.

=== 2nd T20I ===
23 December 2025
19:00 (N)
Scorecard

| Sri Lanka; 128/9 (20 overs) | v | India; 129/3 (11.5 overs) |
| Harshitha Samarawickrama 33 (32); Shree Charani 2/23 (4 overs) | | Shafali Verma 69* (34); Kavisha Dilhari 1/15 (2 overs) |

India won by 7 wickets
ACA–VDCA Cricket Stadium, Visakhapatnam
Umpires: Narayanan Janani (Ind) and Vrinda Rathi (Ind)
Player of the match: Shafali Verma (Ind)

- India won the toss and elected to field.

=== 3rd T20I ===
26 December 2025
19:00 (N)
Scorecard

| Sri Lanka; 112/7 (20 overs) | v | India; 115/2 (13.2 overs) |
| Imesha Dulani 27 (32); Renuka Singh 4/21 (4 overs) | | Shafali Verma 79* (42); Kavisha Dilhari 2/18 (3 overs) |

India won by 8 wickets
Greenfield International Stadium, Thiruvananthapuram
Umpires: Narayanan Janani (Ind) and Gayathri Venugopalan (Ind)
Player of the match: Renuka Singh (Ind)

- India won the toss and elected to field.
- Nimasha Meepage (SL) made her T20I debut.
- This was the first women's T20I to be played at this venue.
- Deepti Sharma (Ind) took her 150th wicket in T20Is.

=== 4th T20I ===
28 December 2025
19:00 (N)
Scorecard

| India; 221/2 (20 overs) | v | Sri Lanka; 191/6 (20 overs) |
| Smriti Mandhana 80 (48); Malsha Shehani 1/32 (4 overs) | | Chamari Athapaththu 52 (37); Vaishnavi Sharma 2/24 (4 overs) |

India won by 30 runs
Greenfield International Stadium, Thiruvananthapuram
Umpires: Ankita Guha (Ind) and Vrinda Rathi (Ind)
Player of the match: Smriti Mandhana (Ind)

- Sri Lanka won the toss and elected to field.
- Chamari Athapaththu (SL) played in her 150th T20I match.
- Smriti Mandhana (Ind) scored her 10,000th run in international cricket.
- Shafali Verma and Smriti Mandhana's 162-run partnership was the highest for any wicket for India in women's T20Is.
- This was India's highest total in women's T20Is.

=== 5th T20I ===
30 December 2025
19:00 (N)
Scorecard

| India; 175/7 (20 overs) | v | Sri Lanka; 160/7 (20 overs) |
| Harmanpreet Kaur 68 (43); Kavisha Dilhari 2/11 (2 overs) | | Hasini Perera 65 (42); Arundhati Reddy 1/16 (2 overs) |

India won by 15 runs
Greenfield International Stadium, Thiruvananthapuram
Umpires: Vrinda Rathi (Ind) and Gayathri Venugopalan (Ind)
Player of the match: Harmanpreet Kaur (Ind)

- Sri Lanka won the toss and elected to field.
- Gunalan Kamalini (Ind) made her T20I debut.
- Deepti Sharma (Ind) became the leading wicket-taker in women's T20Is.
