= 2026 Women's Twenty20 Asia Cup =

International cricket tournament

- Dates: 28 August – 13 September 2026
- Administrator: Asian Cricket Council
- Cricket format: Women's Twenty20 International
- Tournament format(s): Group stage and knockout stage
- Host: United Arab Emirates
- Champions: India (4th title)
- Runners-up: Sri Lanka
- Participants: 8
- Matches: 15
- Most runs: (India) Shafali Verma (236)
- Most wickets: (India) Deepti Sharma (14)

The 2026 Women's Twenty20 Asia Cup also branded as DP World Women's Asia Cup 2026 was the sixth edition of the Women's Twenty20 Asia Cup and overall the tenth Women's Asia Cup. It was hosted by the Emirates Cricket Board from 28 August to 13 September 2026 with 8 teams competing in 15 matches at the Dubai International Cricket Stadium. Sri Lanka were the defending champions and were defeated in the final by India who went onto win their record-extending fourth title in the T20 format and overall the eighth title in the Asia Cup.

== Background ==
The Women's Twenty20 Asia Cup is a biennial international cricket competition in Women's Twenty20 International (WT20I) format, organised by the Asian Cricket Council (ACC). It was inaugurated in 2004 as Women's Asia Cup, an annual Women's One Day International (WODI) competition and was held as such until 2006. It was converted to a biennial tournament from then on and since 2012, has been held in the WT20I format. Sri Lanka were the defending champions having defeated India in the previous edition's final.

In the 2025–2029 ICC Women's Future Tours Programme, the tournament was scheduled to be held in September–October 2026. However on 6 August 2026, the ACC announced that the tournament would instead be held from 28 August to 13 September 2026 in Dubai. Eight participating teams were divided into two groups of four teams each. In the group stage, each team played every other team in its group once in a round-robin format. The top two teams from each group advanced to the knockout stage, which consisted of two semi-finals, with the winners facing off in the final.

== Qualification ==
The four full members of the ACC with a women's team: Bangladesh, India, Pakistan and Sri Lanka were given direct qualification for the tournament, while eighteen of the associate teams of the ACC competed in the 2026 ACC Women's Premier Cup to determine four entrants: Hong Kong, Indonesia, Thailand and the United Arab Emirates.

Teams qualified for the tournament
Method of qualification	No. of teams	Date of qualification	Teams
Full members	4	—N/a	Bangladesh
Full members	4	—N/a	India
Full members	4	—N/a	Pakistan
Full members	4	—N/a	Sri Lanka
ACC Premier Cup	4	3 – 13 June 2026	Hong Kong
ACC Premier Cup	4	3 – 13 June 2026	Indonesia
ACC Premier Cup	4	3 – 13 June 2026	Thailand
ACC Premier Cup	4	3 – 13 June 2026	United Arab Emirates
Total	8		

== Venue ==
In August 2026, the ACC announced that all the matches would be played at the Dubai International Cricket Stadium.

Venue in the United Arab Emirates
A map of the United Arab Emirates with pin-points on 2026 Women's Twenty20 Asia Cup venue	Dubai
A map of the United Arab Emirates with pin-points on 2026 Women's Twenty20 Asia Cup venue	Dubai International Cricket Stadium
A map of the United Arab Emirates with pin-points on 2026 Women's Twenty20 Asia Cup venue	Capacity: 25,000
A map of the United Arab Emirates with pin-points on 2026 Women's Twenty20 Asia Cup venue	Matches: 15 (Semi-finals & final)
A map of the United Arab Emirates with pin-points on 2026 Women's Twenty20 Asia Cup venue	Dubai International Cricket Stadium in 2019

== Squads ==
Following squads were announced for the tournament:

- Bangladesh: Dilara Akter (wk), Marufa Akter, Nahida Akter, Sharmin Akhter, Shorna Akter, Juairiya Ferdous (wk), Rabeya Khan, Fahima Khatun, Sultana Khatun, Sanjida Akter Meghla, Ritu Moni, Sobhana Mostary, Nigar Sultana (c, wk), Sharmin Sultana, Fariha Trisna
- Hong Kong: Maryam Bibi, Charlotte Chan, Kary Chan, Shing Chan, Yasmin Daswani (wk), Mariko Hill, Joyleen Kaur, Mahekdeep Kaur, Marina Lamplough, Natasha Miles (c), Iqra Sahar, Shanzeen Shahzad (wk), Alison Siu, Ruchitha Venkatesh, Hailey Wong
- India: Shree Charani, Kranti Gaud, Richa Ghosh (wk), Bharti Fulmali, Gunalan Kamalini (wk), Harmanpreet Kaur (c), Smriti Mandhana, Pratika Rawal (Note: Pratika Rawal replaced Jemimah Rodrigues in India's squad, after the latter withdrew due to hamstring injury.), Arundhati Reddy, Deepti Sharma, Nandani Sharma, Renuka Singh, Shafali Verma, Radha Yadav, ~~Jemimah Rodrigues~~
- Indonesia: Ni Kadek Ariani, Derni Bangi, Maria Corazon (wk), Ni Luh Wesika Ratna Dewi, Kisi Kasse, Dara Agung Laksmi, Sang Ayu Maypriani, Rahmawati Pangestuti, Kadek Winda Prastini, Lie Qiao, Ni Kadek Fitria Rada Rani, Ni Putu Ayu Nanda Sakarini (c, wk), Ni Made Putri Suwandewi, Sofia Velic, Desi Wulandari
- Pakistan: Waheeda Akhtar, Muneeba Ali (wk), Eyman Fatima, Gull Feroza, Umm-e-Hani, Tuba Hassan, Sadia Iqbal, Saira Jabeen, Eman Naseer, Momina Riasat, Fatima Sana (c), Nashra Sandhu, Sadaf Shamas (Note: Sadaf Shamas replaced Najiha Alvi in Pakistan's squad, after the latter withdrew due to knee injury.), Ayesha Zafar, Shawaal Zulfiqar, ~~Najiha Alvi~~
- Sri Lanka: Chamari Athapaththu (c), Mithali Ayodya, Nilakshi de Silva, Kavisha Dilhari, Imesha Dulani, Vishmi Gunaratne, Kawya Kavindi, Sanjana Kavindi, Sugandika Kumari, Kaushini Nuthyangana (wk), Hasini Perera, Chamudi Praboda, Harshitha Samarawickrama, Dewmi Vihanga, Chethana Vimukthi
- Thailand: Nannaphat Chaihan, Naruemol Chaiwai (c, wk), Natthakan Chantham, Sunida Chaturongrattana, Naomi Hamilton, Onnicha Kamchomphu, Nannapat Koncharoenkai (wk), Suleeporn Laomi, Phannita Maya, Chayanisa Phengpaen, Thipatcha Putthawong, Thanrada Seesawan, Chanida Sutthiruang, Aphisara Suwanchonrathi, Koranit Suwanchonrathi
- United Arab Emirates: Samaira Dharnidharka, Siya Gokhale, Heena Hotchandani, Uttara Iyer, Lavanya Keny, Suraksha Kotte, Mehul Kulkarni, Vaishnave Mahesh, Indhuja Nandakumar, Esha Oza (c), Rinitha Rajith, Theertha Satish (wk), Sashikala Silva, Archara Supriya, Janani Thirukkumaran

Player replacements

== Group stage ==
The group stage featured a total of 12 matches played from 28 August to 8 September 2026. The top two teams from each group advanced to the knockout stage.

Group A	Group B
Hong Kong; India; Pakistan; Thailand	Bangladesh; Indonesia; Sri Lanka; United Arab Emirates

=== Group A ===
Group A standings
Pos	Team	Pld	W	L	NR	Pts	NRR	Qualification
1	India	3	3	0	0	6	5.471	Advanced to the knockout stage
2	Pakistan	3	2	1	0	4	0.927	Advanced to the knockout stage
3	Thailand	3	1	2	0	2	−2.050	Eliminated
4	Hong Kong	3	0	3	0	0	−3.583	Eliminated

Source: Cricinfo

Match 1
28 August 2026
18:30 UTC+4 (N)
Scorecard

Thailand; 120/9 (20 overs)	v	Hong Kong; 114/7 (20 overs)
Naruemol Chaiwai 43 (31); Marina Lamplough 4/11 (4 overs)		Kary Chan 28 (20); Onnicha Kamchomphu 3/27 (4 overs)

Thailand won by 6 runs
Dubai International Cricket Stadium, Dubai
Umpires: Rabab Ahsan (UAE) and Vrinda Rathi (Ind)
Player of the match: Naruemol Chaiwai (Tha)

- Hong Kong won the toss and elected to field.
- Naomi Hamilton (Tha) made her T20I debut.

Match 3
30 August 2026
18:30 UTC+4 (N)
Scorecard

India; 159/9 (20 overs)	v	Thailand; 65 (16.1 overs)
Shafali Verma 64 (36); Suleeporn Laomi 3/26 (4 overs)		Nannapat Koncharoenkai 41 (48); Deepti Sharma 3/0 (1.1 overs)

India won by 94 runs
Dubai International Cricket Stadium, Dubai
Umpires: Mishu Chowdhury (Ban) and Nimali Perera (SL)
Player of the match: Shafali Verma (Ind)

- Thailand won the toss and elected to field.
- Pratika Rawal (Ind) made her T20I debut.
- Deepti Sharma (Ind) played in her 150th WT20I match.

Match 5
1 September 2026
18:30 UTC+4 (N)
Scorecard

Pakistan; 119/9 (20 overs)	v	Thailand; 84/8 (20 overs)
Muneeba Ali 54 (52); Suleeporn Laomi 3/14 (4 overs)		Chanida Sutthiruang 25 (24); Sadia Iqbal 3/11 (4 overs)

Pakistan won by 35 runs
Dubai International Cricket Stadium, Dubai
Umpires: Shathira Jakir (Ban) and Nimali Perera (SL)
Player of the match: Muneeba Ali (Pak)

- Pakistan won the toss and elected to bat.

Match 7
3 September 2026
18:30 UTC+4 (N)
Scorecard

India; 193/5 (20 overs)	v	Hong Kong; 56 (16.2 overs)
Smriti Mandhana 124 (64); Marina Lamplough 2/46 (4 overs)		Natasha Miles 15 (27); Deepti Sharma 3/9 (3 overs)

India won by 137 runs
Dubai International Cricket Stadium, Dubai
Umpires: Mishu Chowdhury (Ban) and Nimali Perera (SL)
Player of the match: Smriti Mandhana (Ind)

- Hong Kong won the toss and elected to field.
- This was the first time Hong Kong and India faced each other in WT20Is.
- Alison Siu (HK) played in her 100th WT20I match.
- Smriti Mandhana (Ind) surpassed Mithali Raj to become the highest run-scorer and Meg Lanning to become the highest century-scorer in international women's cricket.
- India qualified for the semi-finals as a result of this match.

Match 9
5 September 2026
18:30 UTC+4 (N)
Scorecard

Pakistan; 55 (18.1 overs)	v	India; 57/3 (8.4 overs)
Shawaal Zulfiqar 14 (14); Shree Charani 3/7 (4 overs)		Harmanpreet Kaur 18* (18); Fatima Sana 3/17 (3 overs)

India won by 7 wickets
Dubai International Cricket Stadium, Dubai
Umpires: Shathira Jakir (Ban) and Nimali Perera (SL)
Player of the match: Shree Charani (Ind)

- Pakistan won the toss and elected to bat.
- Harmanpreet Kaur (Ind) became the first captain to play in 150 WT20I matches as captain.
- This was Pakistan's lowest total in WT20Is.
- Shafali Verma (Ind) scored her 3,000th run in WT20Is.

Match 11
7 September 2026
18:30 UTC+4 (N)
Scorecard

Pakistan; 143/8 (20 overs)	v	Hong Kong; 71 (19 overs)
Shawaal Zulfiqar 47 (35); Joyleen Kaur 4/19 (4 overs)		Kary Chan 30 (47); Nashra Sandhu 6/7 (4 overs)

Pakistan won by 72 runs
Dubai International Cricket Stadium, Dubai
Umpires: Rabab Ahsan (UAE) and Mishu Chowdhury (Ban)
Player of the match: Nashra Sandhu (Pak)

- Pakistan won the toss and elected to bat.
- This was the first time Hong Kong and Pakistan faced each other in WT20Is.
- Nashra Sandhu (Pak) took her maiden five-wicket haul in WT20Is and became the first Pakistani player to take 6 wickets in a WT20I match.
- Pakistan qualified for the semi-finals while Hong Kong and Thailand were eliminated as a result of this match.

=== Group B ===
Group B standings
Pos	Team	Pld	W	L	NR	Pts	NRR	Qualification
1	Sri Lanka	3	3	0	0	6	2.730	Advanced to the knockout stage
2	Bangladesh	3	2	1	0	4	1.688	Advanced to the knockout stage
3	United Arab Emirates (H)	3	1	2	0	2	−1.158	Eliminated
4	Indonesia	3	0	3	0	0	−3.169	Eliminated

Source: Cricinfo
(H) Hosts

Match 2
29 August 2026
18:30 UTC+4 (N)
Scorecard

United Arab Emirates; 79 (19.5 overs)	v	Sri Lanka; 80/1 (7.5 overs)
Esha Oza 18 (24); Mithali Ayodhya 3/14 (3.5 overs)		Chamari Athapaththu 48* (25)

Sri Lanka won by 9 wickets
Dubai International Cricket Stadium, Dubai
Umpires: Humaira Farah (Pak) and Shathira Jakir (Ban)
Player of the match: Chethana Vimukthi (SL)

- Sri Lanka won the toss and elected to field.
- Chethana Vimukthi (SL) made her T20I debut.

Match 4
31 August 2026
18:30 UTC+4 (N)
Scorecard

Bangladesh; 129/8 (20 overs)	v	Indonesia; 58 (17.3 overs)
Sobhana Mostary 40 (42); Ni Ariani 3/28 (4 overs)		Maria Corazon 12 (13); Nahida Akter 3/15 (4 overs)

Bangladesh won by 71 runs
Dubai International Cricket Stadium, Dubai
Umpires: Saleema Imtiaz (Pak) and Shivani Mishra (Qat)
Player of the match: Nahida Akter (Ban)

- Indonesia won the toss and elected to field.
- This was the first time Indonesia and Bangladesh faced each other in WT20Is.
- Sofia Velic (Idn) made her T20I debut.

Match 6
2 September 2026
18:30 UTC+4 (N)
Scorecard

Sri Lanka; 124/7 (20 overs)	v	Indonesia; 49 (18.3 overs)
Nilakshi de Silva 50 (35); Ni Luh Dewi 3/32 (4 overs)		Ni Made Putri Suwandewi 12* (32); Chamari Athapaththu 7/5 (3.3 overs)

Sri Lanka won by 75 runs
Dubai International Cricket Stadium, Dubai
Umpires: Shivani Mishra (Qat) and Saleema Imtiaz (Pak)
Player of the match: Chamari Athapaththu (SL)

- Indonesia won the toss and elected to field.
- This was the first time Sri Lanka and Indonesia faced each other in WT20Is.
- Chamari Athapaththu (SL) took her maiden five-wicket haul in WT20Is, and became the first Sri Lankan player to take a hat-trick in WT20Is and the first Sri Lankan to take 7 wickets in a WT20I match.

Match 8
4 September 2026
18:30 UTC+4 (N)
Scorecard

Indonesia; 73 (19.4 overs)	v	United Arab Emirates; 75/4 (13.1 overs)
Ni Putu Ayu Nanda Sakarini 39 (52); Suraksha Kotte 3/16 (4 overs)		Esha Oza 30 (29); Sofia Velic 2/25 (3.1 overs)

United Arab Emirates won by 6 wickets
Dubai International Cricket Stadium, Dubai
Umpires: Shivani Mishra (Qat) and Vrinda Rathi (Ind)
Player of the match: Esha Oza (UAE)

- United Arab Emirates won the toss and elected to field.

Match 10
6 September 2026
18:30 UTC+4 (N)
Scorecard

Bangladesh; 114/8 (20 overs)	v	Sri Lanka; 115/6 (19.2 overs)
Sobhana Mostary 34 (41); Chamudi Praboda 3/21 (4 overs)		Harshitha Samarawickrama 48* (37); Marufa Akter 3/21 (4 overs)

Sri Lanka won by 4 wickets
Dubai International Cricket Stadium, Dubai
Umpires: Humaira Farah (Pak) and Vrinda Rathi (Ind)
Player of the match: Harshitha Samarawickrama (SL)

- Sri Lanka won the toss and elected to field.
- Farjana Easmin (Ban) made her T20I debut.
- Sri Lanka qualified for the semi-finals while Indonesia were eliminated as a result of this match.

Match 12
8 September 2026
18:30 UTC+4 (N)
Scorecard

Bangladesh; 103/7 (20 overs)	v	United Arab Emirates; 69/9 (20 overs)
Sharmin Akhter 38 (31); Suraksha Kotte 3/11 (4 overs)		Heena Hotchandani 18 (19); Rabeya Khan 3/14 (4 overs)

Bangladesh won by 34 runs
Dubai International Cricket Stadium, Dubai
Umpires: Saleema Imtiaz (Pak) and Vrinda Rathi (Ind)
Player of the match: Nahida Akter (Ban)

- United Arab Emirates won the toss and elected to field.
- Bangladesh qualified for the semi-finals while the United Arab Emirates were eliminated as a result of this match.

== Knockout stage ==
The knockout stage consisted of two semi-finals played on 10 and 11 September and the final played on 13 September.

=== Bracket ===
Semi-finals
A1	India	149/6 (20 overs)
B2	Bangladesh	109/7 (20 overs)
B1	Sri Lanka	134/6 (18.4 overs)
A2	Pakistan	130/5 (20 overs)

Final
SF1W	India	183/5 (20 overs)
SF2W	Sri Lanka	111 (20 overs)

- Sources: Cricinfo

=== Semi-finals ===
Semi-final 1
10 September 2026
18:30 UTC+4 (N)
Scorecard

India; 149/6 (20 overs)	v	Bangladesh; 109/7 (20 overs)
Shafali Verma 64 (40); Sultana Khatun 2/30 (3 overs)		Shorna Akter 22* (18); Deepti Sharma 3/26 (4 overs)

India won by 40 runs
Dubai International Cricket Stadium, Dubai
Umpires: Saleema Imtiaz (Pak) and Nimali Perera (SL)
Player of the match: Shafali Verma (Ind)

- Bangladesh won the toss and elected to field.
- Marufa Akter (Ban) played in her 50th WT20I match.
- Shree Charani (Ind) took her 50th wicket in WT20Is.
- India qualfied for their sixth consecutive T20 final and overall their tenth consecutive Asia Cup final.

Semi-final 2
11 September 2026
18:30 UTC+4 (N)
Scorecard

Pakistan; 130/5 (20 overs)	v	Sri Lanka; 134/6 (18.4 overs)
Fatima Sana 47* (36); Chamari Athapaththu 2/24 (4 overs)		Harshitha Samarawickrama 36 (31); Fatima Sana 4/38 (3.4 overs)

Sri Lanka won by 4 wickets
Dubai International Cricket Stadium, Dubai
Umpires: Shathira Jakir (Ban) and Vrinda Rathi (Ind)
Player of the match: Fatima Sana (Pak)

- Sri Lanka won the toss and elected to field.
- Sri Lanka qualfied for their third consecutive T20 final and overall their sixth Asia Cup final.

=== Final ===
India won the toss and elected to bat first. Indian openers Smriti Mandhana and Shafali Verma scored 59 and 68 runs respectively to put together a 129-run opening partnership. The next three batters were dismissed for under 20 runs each. In the final over, Gunalan Kamalini scored 15 runs in 5 balls to take India to the total of 183 runs for the loss of 5 wickets. Chasing the target, Sri Lanka lost an early wicket in the first over. Sri Lankan captain Chamari Athapaththu and Vishmi Gunaratne put together a 58-run partnership before both were dismissed in the tenth over. Nilakshika Silva scored 22 runs before being dismissed while the other remaining batters were all dismissed for single-digit scores, bundling out Sri Lanka for 111 runs as India secured a 72-run victory.

This was India's fourth T20 Asia Cup victory after 2012, 2016 and 2022; and overall eighth Asia Cup victory including the four WODI titles in 2004, 2005, 2006 and 2008. Shafali received the player of the match award for her batting performance as well as her bowling. After the match, the ACC's chairman Mohsin Naqvi, who is also the charmain of the Pakistan Cricket Board and the interior minister of Pakistan presented medals to the runners-up Sri Lanka. However, India refused to accept the trophy from him due to the India–Pakistan political issues. This is the second time of such occurrence, after the 2025 Asia Cup where the India men's team also refused to accept the trophy from Naqvi in the aftermath of the Pahalgam terror attack and the subsequent 2025 India–Pakistan conflict, and Naqvi walked away with the trophy.

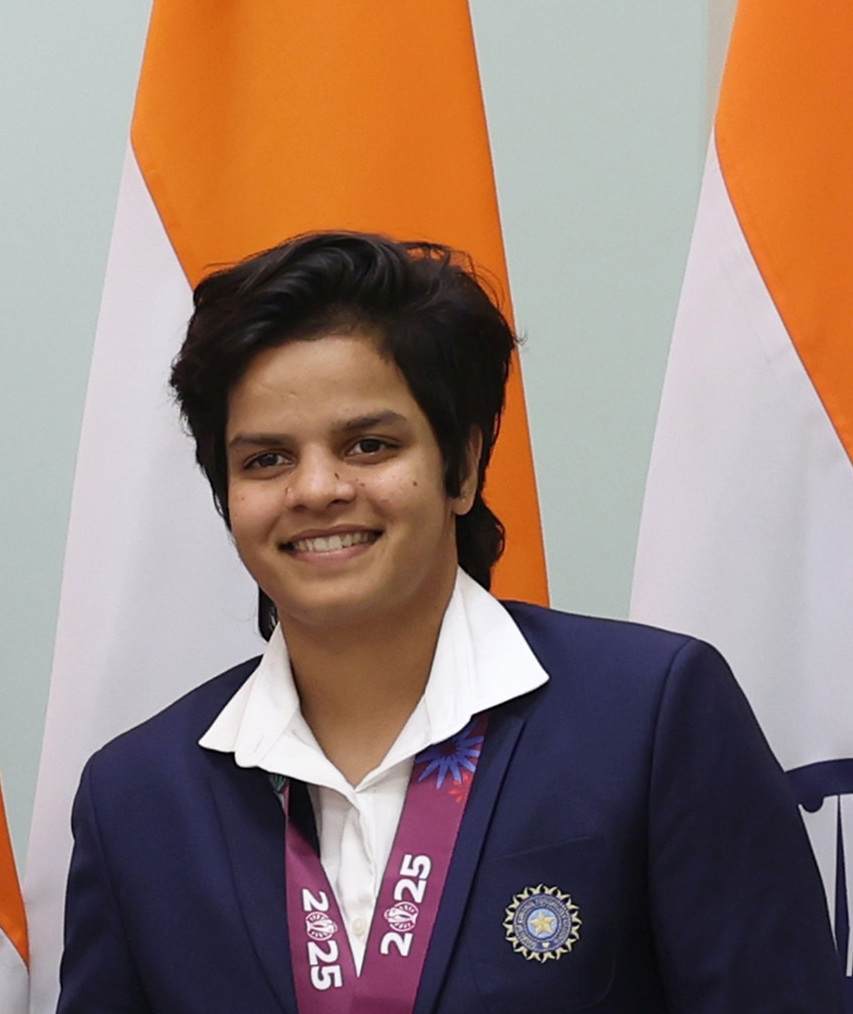
Shafali Verma received the player of the match award for the final.

13 September 2026 (N)
Scorecard

India; 183/5 (20 overs)	v	Sri Lanka; 111 (20 overs)

India won by 72 runs
Dubai International Cricket Stadium, Dubai

== Statistics ==
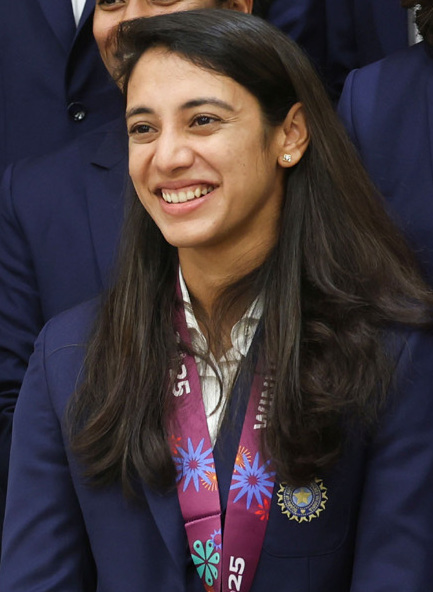
Smriti Mandhana scored a century in the 2026 tournament.

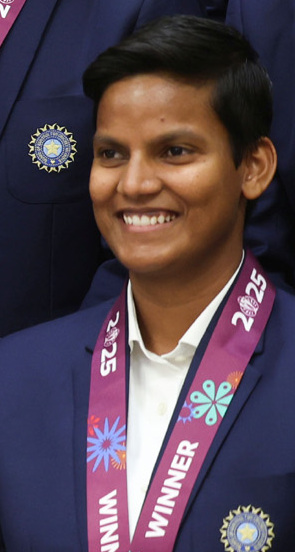
Deepti Sharma took the most wickets (14) in the 2026 tournament.

Shafali Verma of India scored the most runs in the 2026 tournament (236 runs from 5 innings). One century was scored as well as a 100-run partnerships in the 2026 tournament. Deepti Sharma of India took the most wickets in the 2026 tournament (14 wickets from 5 innings). A total of six four-wicket hauls and two five-wicket hauls were taken in the 2026 tournament.

Most runs
Runs	Player	Team
236	Shafali Verma	India
213	Smriti Mandhana	India
108	Nilakshi de Silva	Sri Lanka
99	Chamari Athapaththu	Sri Lanka
98	Harshitha Samarawickrama	Sri Lanka

Most wickets
Wickets	Player	Team
14	Deepti Sharma	India
12	Shree Charani	India
12	Chamari Athapaththu	Sri Lanka
9	Fatima Sana	Pakistan
8	Marufa Akter	Bangladesh

== Broadcasting ==
Broadcasters for the tournament
Region	Country/Sub-region	Television networks	Streaming platforms
Africa	Middle East and North Africa	StarzPlay Cricket	StarzPlay
Asia	Bangladesh	T Sports	—N/a
Asia	Hong Kong	—N/a	Cricbuzz
Asia	India	Sony Sports Network	SonyLIV
Asia	Indonesia	—N/a	Cricbuzz
Asia	Malaysia	—N/a	Cricbuzz
Asia	Pakistan	PTV Sports	Tamasha
Asia	Singapore	—N/a	Cricbuzz
Asia	Sri Lanka	TV1	—N/a
Asia	Thailand	—N/a	Cricbuzz
Asia	United Arab Emirates	StarzPlay Cricket	StarzPlay
Europe	Continental Europe	—N/a	Cricbuzz
Europe	United Kingdom	Sony Max	—N/a

== See also ==
- International cricket in 2026
- Associate international cricket in 2026
