= Jess Jonassen =

Australian cricketer (born 1992)

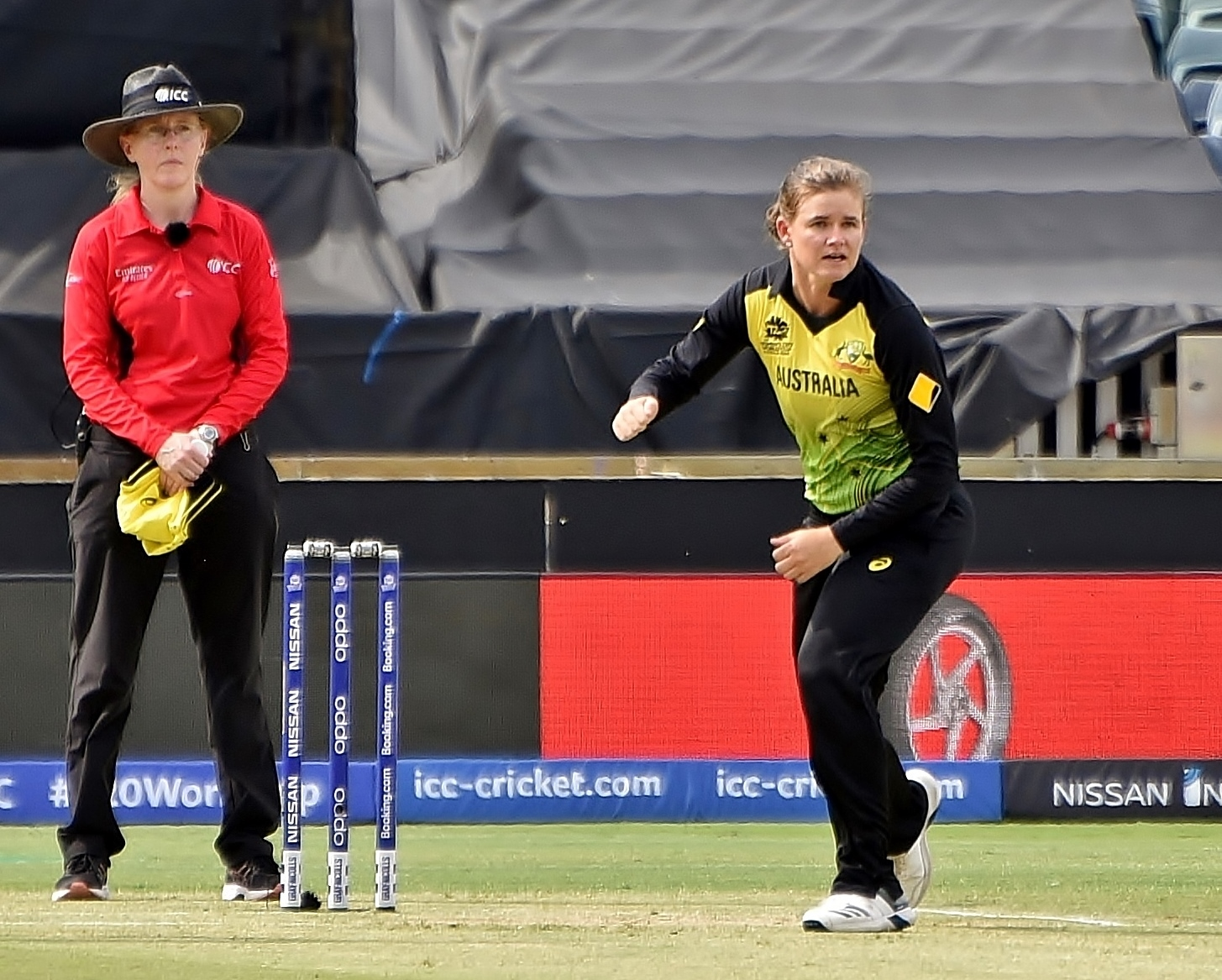
- Jonassen playing for Australia during the 2020 ICC Women's T20 World Cup

Personal information
- Full name: Jessica Louise Jonassen
- Born: 5 November 1992 (age 34); Emerald, Queensland, Australia
- Batting: Left-handed
- Bowling: Slow left-arm orthodox
- Role: Bowler

International information
- National side: Australia (2012–2023)
- Test debut (cap 170): 11 August 2015 v England
- Last Test: 22 June 2023 v England
- ODI debut (cap 122): 25 January 2012 v New Zealand
- Last ODI: 11 February 2023 v New Zealand
- ODI shirt no.: 21
- T20I debut (cap 33): 20 January 2012 v New Zealand
- Last T20I: 5 July 2023 v England
- T20I shirt no.: 21

Domestic team information
- Years: Team
- 2008/09–: Queensland
- 2015/16–: Brisbane Heat
- 2017: Lancashire Thunder
- 2023–2025: Delhi Capitals
- 2024–2025: Welsh Fire
- 2024: Trinbago Knight Riders
- 2027 - present: Royal Challengers Bengaluru (WPL)

Career statistics
Competition	Test	ODI	T20I
Matches	6	93	105
Runs scored	291	610	438
Batting average	29.10	19.06	12.88
100s/50s	0/2	0/0	0/0
Top score	99	39	47
Balls bowled	833	4,161	1,962
Wickets	7	141	96
Bowling average	46.71	19.60	19.62
5 wickets in innings	0	2	1
10 wickets in match	0	0	0
Best bowling	2/50	5/27	5/12
Catches/stumpings	3/–	28/–	29/–
Medal record
Women's Cricket
Representing Australia
T20 World Cup
Winner	2012 Sri Lanka
Winner	2014 Bangladesh
Runner-up	2016 India
Winner	2018 West Indies
Winner	2020 Australia
Winner	2023 South Africa
ODI World Cup
Winner	2022 New Zealand
Commonwealth Games
Gold medal – first place	2022 Birmingham
- Source: ESPNcricinfo, 7 August 2025

Jessica Louise Jonassen (born 5 November 1992) is an Australian cricketer. A left-arm orthodox bowler, Jonassen has been a member of the national women's team since 2012, going on to win five ICC T20 World Cups & one ICC Cricket World Cup while becoming the fourth woman to have taken 100 One Day International wickets for Australia. Domestically, she is the current captain of both the Queensland Fire in the Women's National Cricket League (WNCL) and the Brisbane Heat in the Women's Big Bash League (WBBL).

== Early life and education ==
Jonassen was born in Emerald, a rural town in the Central Highlands Region of Queensland, but grew up approximately 270 km (170 mi) away in the coastal city of Rockhampton. She attended high school at Emmaus College, Rockhampton, graduating in 2009.

When Jonassen was 10 or 11, she started playing cricket, initially at school and later for Rockhampton Brothers. She played in boys' teams; at that time, there were no girls only cricket programs in rural Queensland. Jonassen progressed through third grade and second grade levels, and eventually played a couple of A-grade games not long before she finished school and moved to Brisbane. There, she played for University of Queensland.

After completing a law degree at Griffith University in 2015, Jonassen continued her studies by undertaking a graduate certificate in forensic mental health.

== Domestic career ==
=== Women's National Cricket League ===
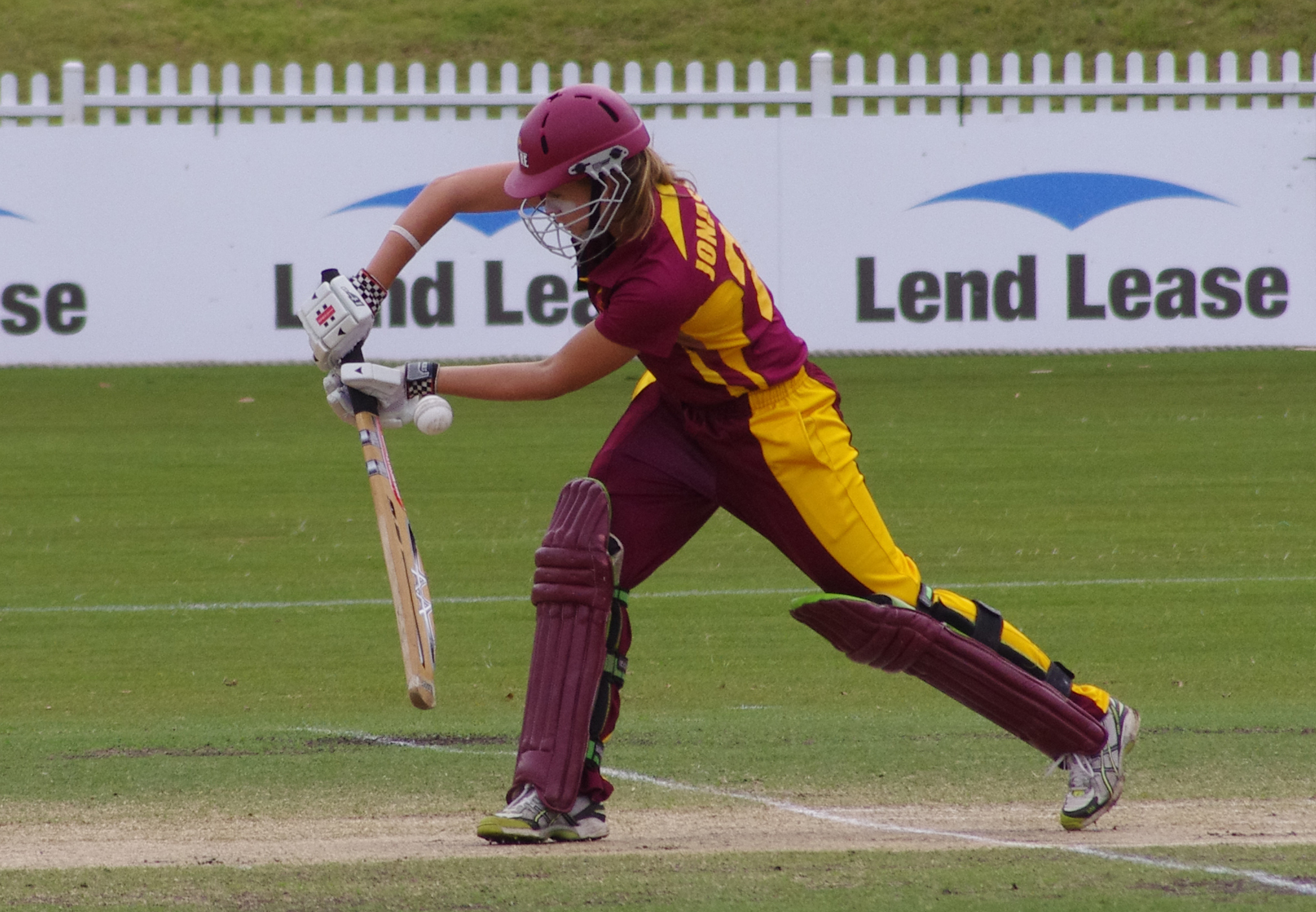
Jonassen batting for the Queensland Fire

Jonassen began playing for the Queensland Fire in the Women's National Cricket League (WNCL) during the 2008–09 season. Making her WNCL debut against the New South Wales Breakers just three weeks after her 16th birthday (scoring 12 not out off 16 balls and taking 0/21 from three overs in an eight-wicket loss), she went on to play every game of the season and finished with twelve wickets at an average of 19.83.

During the 2010–11 season, Jonassen took her batting to a new level, scoring the fifth-most runs in the league with 228 at an average of 57 and earning Queensland's Player of the Year award. She won the same award again, as well as the league-wide Player of the Year title, for the 2014–15 season in which she took the second-most wickets (eleven at an average of 13.36) and scored 197 runs at 49.25 despite missing several games due to injury.

Ahead of the 2020–21 season, Jonassen assumed the captaincy of Queensland, taking over from the retired Kirby Short.

=== Women's Big Bash League ===
Jonassen signed with her local Women's Big Bash League (WBBL) team, the Brisbane Heat, as a marquee player for the competition's inaugural season. She took the fourth-most wickets during the 2016–17 season (18 at an average of 15.88), before the Heat were knocked out of the tournament via a crushing nine-wicket semi-final loss to the Perth Scorchers at the WACA.

Two seasons later, Jonassen was at the centre of an iconic moment during the first WBBL|04 semi-final at Drummoyne Oval against the Sydney Thunder, bowling the final delivery of the match to Nicola Carey who initially appeared to hit the ball for a game-winning six until an unlikely catch by Haidee Birkett was taken metres inside the boundary rope. On the following weekend in the final against the Sydney Sixers, Jonassen contributed 1/28 from four overs as the Heat went on to win by three wickets to claim their maiden championship.

Jonassen enjoyed an outstanding WBBL|05 campaign, notably increasing her output with the bat (scoring 419 runs at an average of 38.09) for which she credited an "honest conversation" with new coach Ashley Noffke. She also took the second-most wickets in the league with 22 at an average of 18.31 and won the Heat's Most Valuable Player award. In a four-wicket semi-final win over the Melbourne Renegades at Allan Border Field, Jonassen earned Player of the Match honours by taking 1/25 and scoring 38 off 23 balls. The following day, in the final against the Adelaide Strikers, she finished with match best bowling figures of 2/30 and contributed 33 runs. The Heat won by six wickets, thus becoming back-to-back champions.

In July 2020, Jonassen signed a new contract to stay at Brisbane for another three years. The Heat also announced she would captain the team for WBBL|06.

== Franchise career ==
Jonassen was signed by Welsh Fire for the inaugural season of The Hundred in 2021. However, she withdrew from the tournament due to personal reasons. She returned in 2024 The Hundred season and was again signed by Welsh Fire for £30,000 (AUD 58,000). She emerged as a key performer, finishing as the third-highest wicket-taker in the tournament with 12 wickets. With the bat, she amassed 176 runs including a crucial half century in the final.

She was retained for 2025 The Hundred season by Welsh Fire for £50,000 (AUD 102,000).

=== Women's Premier League ===
In February 2023, Jess Jonassen was bought by Delhi Capitals in the auction for the inaugural season of the Women's Premier League at a price of INR 50 Lakh (AUD 90,000). She played a crucial role for Delhi Capitals as an all-rounder. With the bat, she delivered key performances, including an unbeaten 42 off 20 balls against UP Warriorz, helping her team post a formidable total and was awarded with the player of the match. With the ball, Jonassen showcased her bowling performance by claiming 9 wickets in nine matches, with best figures of 3 for 43. Her consistent performances were instrumental in the Delhi Capitals' campaign during the tournament which led them to the WPL Final in that season.

In the 2024 WPL, she continued her form brilliantly playing for Delhi Capitals as she took 11 wickets with the ball but could only score 66 runs with the bat. Her contribution led Delhi Capitals to the 2024 WPL Final. She was one of the top performing player in the 2025 WPL playing for Delhi Capitals as she took 13 wickets making her third-highest wicket-taker of the tournament and with the bat she scored 150 runs at a strike rate of 145 which included 2 half-centuries leading her side to the 2025 WPL Final.

== International career ==
=== 2012: Limited overs debut, first world championship ===
Jonassen made her international cricket debut in a Twenty20 match on 20 January 2012 against New Zealand at North Sydney Oval. She took two wickets for 28 runs from four overs, with her first scalp being Suzie Bates who was caught by Lisa Sthalekar for 33. In the second innings, Jonassen scored eight not out and put on an unbeaten 25-run partnership with Sarah Coyte to help Australia win by four wickets with one ball remaining.

On 25 January 2012, Jonassen made her One Day International debut at the Sydney Cricket Ground against New Zealand in a match that was abandoned during the 23rd over due to rain, bowling just nine deliveries and finishing with figures of 0/5. She took her first ODI wicket four days later at Blacktown International Sportspark, helping Australia bowl out New Zealand for just 125 which led to a comfortable nine-wicket victory.

At the 2012 ICC World Twenty20 in Sri Lanka, Jonassen played all five games and claimed five wickets at an average of 14. She delivered her best performance of the tournament in the final against England, taking 3/25 from four overs with Australia winning the match by four runs.

=== 2013–15: Second world championship, Test debut ===
Jonassen was named in Australia's squad for the 2013 Women's Cricket World Cup but, after failing to recover quickly enough from knee surgery on her medial meniscus in early January, she was withdrawn days before the team traveled to India for the tournament.

On 20 August 2013, Jonassen made a strong return to international cricket by "(spinning) Australia to victory" at Lord's in the first ODI of the 2013 Women's Ashes. She took 4/38 from 8.3 overs in the 27-run win and, alongside fellow spinner Erin Osborne, orchestrated a batting collapse as England fell from 1/99 to 176 all out in the space of 20 overs.

At the 2014 ICC World Twenty20 in Bangladesh, Jonassen played all six matches and took six wickets at an average of 19.16. She bowled tidily in the final against England, finishing with figures of 0/16 from four overs before Australia went on to win by six wickets to claim another world championship. Her role within the team during the tournament also consisted of being elevated to an opening batter for the semi-final and final. She continued in that position throughout Australia's next seven T20I matches, peaking with back-to-back Player of the Match performances against the West Indies in which she scored 46 off 51 balls on 2 November in a four-wicket win at North Sydney Oval and 47 off 39 balls on 5 November in an 86-run victory at Adelaide Oval.

Jonassen made her Test debut at the St Lawrence Ground during the 2015 Women's Ashes. She played a critical hand with the bat in both innings which earned her Player of the Match honours and helped Australia defeat England by 161 runs. Coming to the crease on the first afternoon with her team in trouble at 4/87 (and 5/99 shortly thereafter), Jonassen formed two key partnerships—a 77-run sixth-wicket stand with Alyssa Healy and a 68-run ninth-wicket stand with Kristen Beams—to take the tourists to 8/268 at stumps. Resuming the second day on a score of 95, she could only manage four more runs before being dismissed lbw by Katherine Brunt on 99 off 197 balls and thus falling agonisingly short of a debut Test century. In the second innings of the match, Jonassen took her first Test wicket by bowling Georgia Elwiss for 17. She recorded another half-century in the third innings, this time making 54 off 72 to expedite the state of play and ensure Australia wrapped up victory on the fourth and final day.

In the second T20I of the 2015 Women's Ashes at the County Ground in Hove, Jonassen was her team's equal-top scorer, making 21 runs off 16 balls. She also took 1/15 from three overs with the ball and two catches in the field, helping Australia defeat England by 20 runs and clinch a series victory.

=== 2016–18: Knee injury, third world championship ===
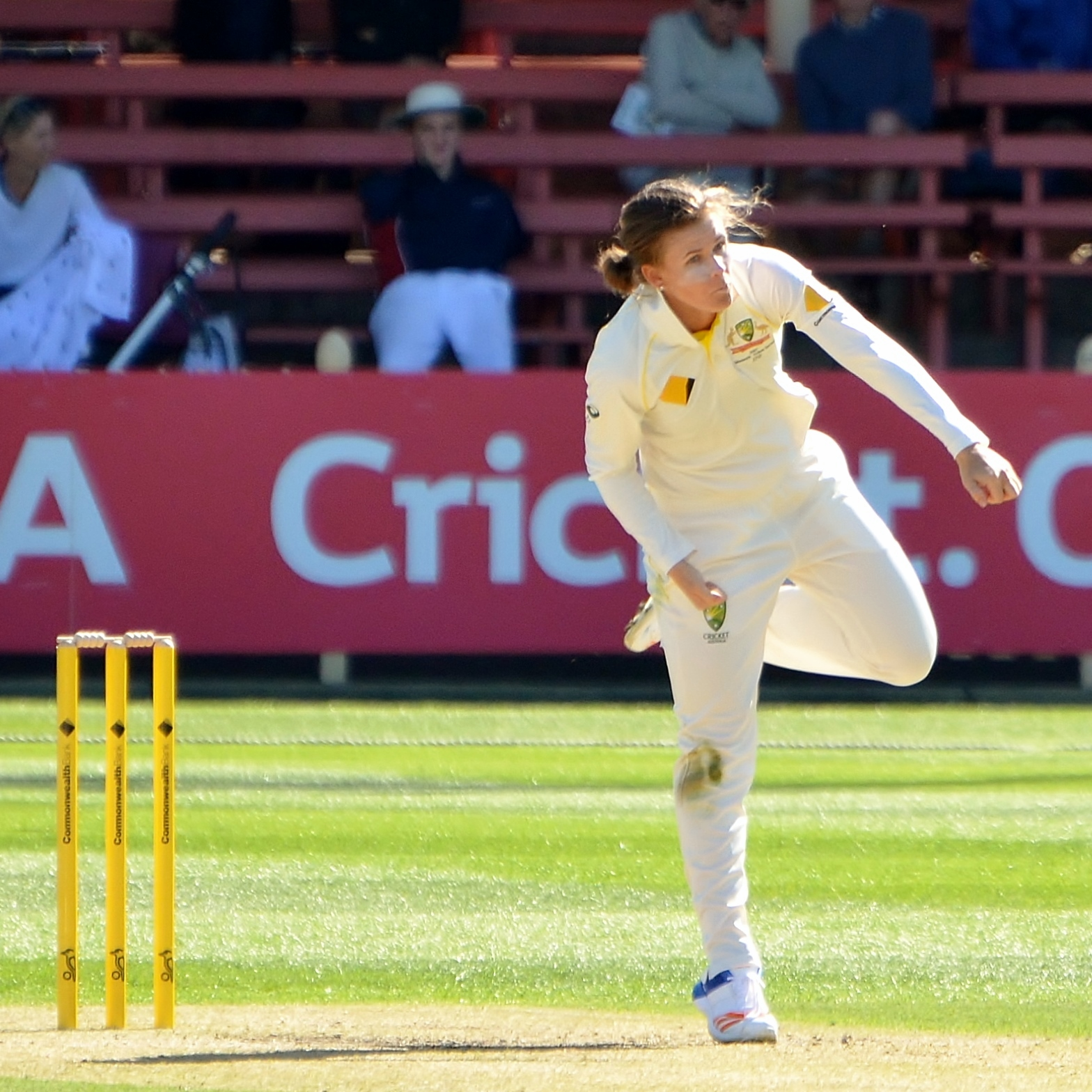
Jonassen bowling in the Only Test of the 2017–18 Women's Ashes

On 22 February 2016, Jonassen achieved her first five-wicket haul in ODI cricket during a Rose Bowl match at the Bay Oval. She finished with figures of 5/50 from nine overs, helping restrict New Zealand to a total of 9/206 which Australia chased down with 54 balls remaining to win by eight wickets.

In the first T20I of the 2017–18 Women's Ashes at North Sydney Oval, Jonassen took 1/14 off three overs in a six-wicket win which saw Australia retain the Ashes. Her only wicket occurred on the second ball of the match, removing England captain Heather Knight via caught behind for a duck. The dismissal was "shrouded in confusion" as Knight was first adjudged out by the officiating umpires, then not out and then out again. The MCC's Laws of Cricket Advisor Jonny Singer later argued that Knight should have been reprieved.

Jonassen underwent knee surgery during September 2018 for the fourth time in her career. She made her return to international cricket on 29 October in a T20I against Pakistan at Kinrara Academy Oval. Despite being named in Australia's squad for the 2018 ICC World Twenty20, Jonassen did not play a match throughout the tournament which the team went on to win by defeating England in the final. In a blog post for The Athletes Voice, she described the experience of having to "find ways to contribute to the team without being on the field" as a mental health battle which led to "some pretty dark places for a while".

=== 2019–present: 100th ODI wicket, fourth world championship ===
On 22 February 2019, Jonassen pulled off a "brilliant fightback" with the ball in Australia's five-run ODI win against New Zealand at the WACA, taking 4/43 off ten overs. Two days later, she claimed her second five-wicket ODI haul, taking 5/27 off eight overs in a 95-run win at Karen Rolton Oval to help seal a series victory.

In the ODI leg of the 2019 Women's Ashes, Jonassen averaged 74 with the bat and 15.6 with the ball, setting up a dominant tour in which the Australian team would only lose one game. She also took match best bowling figures of 2/19 off four overs in the second T20I at the County Ground in Hove, helping to defeat England by seven wickets.

During a 110-run victory against Sri Lanka at Allan Border Field on 7 October 2019, Jonassen became the fourth woman to take 100 ODI wickets for Australia, joining Cathryn Fitzpatrick, Lisa Sthalekar and Ellyse Perry. Achieving the feat in 67 matches, she was the second-fastest woman from any country to reach the milestone, only behind Fitzpatrick's record of 64 innings.

Jonassen managed her first T20I five-wicket haul in the final of the 2020 Tri-Nation Series at the Junction Oval, taking 5/12 off four overs to "completely swing the momentum of the game" and help her team defeat India by eleven runs. In the opening fixture of the 2020 ICC Women's T20 World Cup at Sydney Showground Stadium, also against India, she finished with bowling figures of 2/24 but Australia would lose the match by 17 runs. Then in the tournament final at the Melbourne Cricket Ground, meeting India once again, Jonassen took 3/20 as Australia successfully defended their world title with a commanding 85-run victory.

In January 2022, Jonassen was named in Australia's squad for their series against England to contest the Women's Ashes. Later the same month, she was named in Australia's team for the 2022 Women's Cricket World Cup in New Zealand. In May 2022, Jonassen was named in Australia's team for the cricket tournament at the 2022 Commonwealth Games in Birmingham, England.

== Personal life ==
Jonassen's nicknames are "JJ", her initials, and "Jono", the beginning of her surname.

In February 2018, Jonassen became engaged to partner Sarah Gooderham and they were married in Hawaii 6 April 2023. The couple planned to marry in May 2020 but postponed their wedding due to the COVID-19 pandemic.

Jonassen is an avid supporter of the Western Bulldogs (an Australian rules football team) and has a pet French Bulldog named Alfie. She is also a keen guitarist.

== Honours ==
=== Team ===
- 5x ICC Women's T20 World Cup champion: 2012, 2014, 2018, 2020, 2023
- 1x ICC Women's Cricket World Cup champion: 2022
- 1x Commonwealth games champion: 2022
- 2x Women's Big Bash League champion: 2018–19, 2019–20
- Australian Women's Twenty20 Cup champion: 2013–14

=== Individual ===
- Women's National Cricket League Player of the Year: 2014–15
- Queensland Fire Player of the Year: 2010–11, 2014–15
- Brisbane Heat Most Valuable Player: 2019–20
