= 2025 Women's Premier League (cricket) =

Third edition of the Women's Premier League

- Dates: 14 February – 15 March 2025
- Administrator: Board of Control for Cricket in India
- Cricket format: Twenty20 cricket
- Tournament format(s): Double Round robin and playoffs
- Champions: Mumbai Indians (2nd title)
- Runners-up: Delhi Capitals
- Participants: 5
- Matches: 22
- Player of the series: (England) Nat Sciver-Brunt (Mumbai Indians)
- Most runs: (England) Nat Sciver-Brunt (Mumbai Indians) (523)
- Most wickets: (New Zealand) Amelia Kerr (Mumbai Indians) (18) (Cricket West Indies) Hayley Matthews (Mumbai Indians) (18)
- Official website: wplt20.com

The 2025 Women's Premier League (also known as WPL 2025 and branded as TATA WPL 2025) was the third season of the Women's Premier League, a women's franchise Twenty20 cricket league organised by the Board of Control for Cricket in India (BCCI). The tournament, featuring five teams, was held from 14 February to 15 March 2025. Royal Challengers Bengaluru were the defending champions.

== Format ==
Five teams are playing in 2025. The tournament involves each team playing every other team twice in a home-and-away, double round-robin format. After the double round-robin league, the top three teams qualify for the playoffs based on aggregate points. The team with the highest points will automatically qualify for the final match. The second and third-placed teams will compete with each other (in a match titled "Eliminator"). The winner of the Eliminator match will move on to the final match.

== Venues ==
The tournament was played across four venues: Bengaluru, Lucknow, Mumbai and Vadodara.

Bengaluru	Lucknow	Mumbai	Vadodara
M. Chinnaswamy Stadium	Ekana Cricket Stadium	Brabourne Stadium	Kotambi Stadium
Capacity: 40,000	Capacity: 50,100	Capacity: 50,000	Capacity: 40,000

== Personnel changes ==
A total of 19 players were sold during the auction, five of whom were from overseas.

Name	National side	Team	Price
Shree Charani	India	Delhi Capitals	₹55 lakh (US$57,000)
Sarah Bryce	Scotland	Delhi Capitals	₹10 lakh (US$10,000)
Nandini Kashyap	India	Delhi Capitals	₹10 lakh (US$10,000)
Niki Prasad	India	Delhi Capitals	₹10 lakh (US$10,000)
Simran Shaikh	India	Gujarat Giants	₹1.9 crore (US$200,000)
Deandra Dottin	West Indies	Gujarat Giants	₹1.7 crore (US$180,000)
Danielle Gibson	England	Gujarat Giants	₹30 lakh (US$31,000)
Prakashika Naik	India	Gujarat Giants	₹10 lakh (US$10,000)
G Kamalini	India	Mumbai Indians	₹1.6 crore (US$170,000)
Nadine de Klerk	South Africa	Mumbai Indians	₹30 lakh (US$31,000)
Akshita Maheshwari	India	Mumbai Indians	₹20 lakh (US$21,000)
Sanskriti Gupta	India	Mumbai Indians	₹10 lakh (US$10,000)
Prema Rawat	India	Royal Challengers Bengaluru	₹1.2 crore (US$120,000)
Raghvi Bist	India	Royal Challengers Bengaluru	₹10 lakh (US$10,000)
Jagravi Pawar	India	Royal Challengers Bengaluru	₹10 lakh (US$10,000)
Joshitha V J	India	Royal Challengers Bengaluru	₹10 lakh (US$10,000)
Alana King	Australia	UP Warriorz	₹30 lakh (US$31,000)
Arushi Goel	India	UP Warriorz	₹10 lakh (US$10,000)
Kranti Goud	India	UP Warriorz	₹10 lakh (US$10,000)

== League stage ==
Pos	Team	Pld	W	L	Pts	NRR	Qualification
1	Delhi Capitals (R)	8	5	3	10	0.396	Advanced to the Final
2	Mumbai Indians (C)	8	5	3	10	0.192	Advanced to the Eliminator
3	Gujarat Giants (3rd)	8	4	4	8	0.228	Advanced to the Eliminator
4	Royal Challengers Bengaluru	8	3	5	6	−0.196	Eliminated
5	UP Warriorz	8	3	5	6	−0.624	Eliminated

Source: ESPNcricinfo
(C) Champions; (R) Runners-up

=== Match summary ===
Team	Group matches								Playoffs	
Team	1	2	3	4	5	6	7	8	E	F
Delhi Capitals	2	2	4	4	6	8	10	10		L
Gujarat Giants	0	2	2	2	4	6	8	8	L	
Mumbai Indians	0	2	4	6	6	8	10	10	W	W
Royal Challengers Bengaluru	2	4	4	4	4	4	4	6		
UP Warriorz	0	0	2	4	4	4	4	6		

Win	Loss	No result

- Note: The total points at the end of each group match are listed.
- Note: Click on the points (group matches) or W/L (playoffs) to see the match summary.

Visitor team →	DC	GG	MI	RCB	UPW
Home team ↓	DC	GG	MI	RCB	UPW
Delhi Capitals		Delhi; 6 wickets	Delhi; 9 wickets	Bengaluru; 8 wickets	Lucknow; 33 runs
Gujarat Giants	Gujarat; 5 wickets		Mumbai; 5 wickets	Bengaluru; 6 wickets	Gujarat; 6 wickets
Mumbai Indians	Delhi; 2 wickets	Mumbai; 9 runs		Bengaluru; 11 runs	Mumbai; 8 wickets
Royal Challengers Bengaluru	Delhi; 9 wickets	Gujarat; 6 wickets	Mumbai; 4 wickets		Lucknow; Super Over
UP Warriorz	Delhi; 7 wickets	Gujarat; 81 runs	Mumbai; 6 wickets	Lucknow; 12 runs	

Home team won	Visitor team won

- Note: Results listed are according to the home (horizontal) and visitor (vertical) teams.
- Note: Click on a result to see a summary of the match.

== Fixtures ==
The fixtures were released on 16 January 2025.

Match 1
14 February 2025
19:30 (N)
Scorecard

Gujarat Giants; 201/5 (20 overs)	v	Royal Challengers Bengaluru; 202/4 (18.3 overs)
Ashleigh Gardner 79* (37); Renuka Singh Thakur 2/25 (4 overs)		Richa Ghosh 64* (27); Ashleigh Gardner 2/33 (3 overs)

Royal Challengers Bengaluru won by 6 wickets
Kotambi Stadium, Vadodara
Umpires: Bhavesh Patel and Gayathri Venugopalan
Player of the match: Richa Ghosh (Royal Challengers Bengaluru)

- Royal Challengers Bengaluru won the toss and elected to field.

Match 2
15 February 2025
19:30 (N)
Scorecard

Mumbai Indians; 164 (19.1 overs)	v	Delhi Capitals; 165/8 (20 overs)
Nat Sciver-Brunt 80* (59); Annabel Sutherland 3/34 (3.1 overs)		Shafali Verma 43 (18); Amelia Kerr 2/21 (4 overs)

Delhi Capitals won by 2 wickets
Kotambi Stadium, Vadodara
Umpires: Narayanan Janani and Anish Sahasrabudhe
Player of the match: Niki Prasad (Delhi Capitals)

- Delhi Capitals won the toss and elected to field.

Match 3
16 February 2025
19:30 (N)
Scorecard

UP Warriorz; 143/9 (20 overs)	v	Gujarat Giants; 144/4 (18 overs)
Deepti Sharma 39 (27); Priya Mishra 3/25 (4 overs)		Ashleigh Gardner 52 (32); Sophie Ecclestone 2/16 (4 overs)

Gujarat Giants won by 6 wickets
Kotambi Stadium, Vadodara
Umpires: Ajitesh Argal and Bhavesh Patel
Player of the match: Ashleigh Gardner (Gujarat Giants)

- Gujarat Giants won the toss and elected to field.

Match 4
17 February 2025
19:30 (N)
Scorecard

Delhi Capitals; 141 (19.3 overs)	v	Royal Challengers Bengaluru; 146/2 (16.2 overs)
Jemimah Rodrigues 34 (22); Renuka Singh Thakur 3/23 (4 overs)		Smriti Mandhana 81 (47); Arundhati Reddy 1/25 (3.2 overs)

Royal Challengers Bengaluru won by 8 wickets
Kotambi Stadium, Vadodara
Umpires: Ajitesh Argal and Anish Sahasrabudhe
Player of the match: Renuka Singh Thakur (Royal Challengers Bengaluru)

- Royal Challengers Bengaluru won the toss and elected to field.

Match 5
18 February 2025
19:30 (N)
Scorecard

Gujarat Giants; 120 (20 overs)	v	Mumbai Indians; 122/5 (16.1 overs)
Harleen Deol 32 (31); Hayley Matthews 3/16 (4 overs)		Nat Sciver-Brunt 57 (39); Kashvee Gautam 2/15 (3 overs)

Mumbai Indians won by 5 wickets
Kotambi Stadium, Vadodara
Umpires: Narayanan Janani and Gayathri Venugopalan
Player of the match: Hayley Matthews (Mumbai Indians)

- Mumbai Indians won the toss and elected to field.

Match 6
19 February 2025
19:30 (N)
Scorecard

UP Warriorz; 166/7 (20 overs)	v	Delhi Capitals; 167/3 (19.5 overs)
Kiran Navgire 51 (27); Annabel Sutherland 2/26 (4 overs)		Meg Lanning 69 (49); Grace Harris 1/11 (2 overs)

Delhi Capitals won by 7 wickets
Kotambi Stadium, Vadodara
Umpires: Ajitesh Argal and Bhavesh Patel
Player of the match: Annabel Sutherland (Delhi Capitals)

- Delhi Capitals won the toss and elected to field.

Match 7
21 February 2025
19:30 (N)
Scorecard

Royal Challengers Bengaluru; 167/7 (20 overs)	v	Mumbai Indians; 170/6 (19.5 overs)
Ellyse Perry 81 (43); Amanjot Kaur 3/22 (3 overs)		Harmanpreet Kaur 50 (38); Georgia Wareham 3/21 (4 overs)

Mumbai Indians won by 4 wickets
M. Chinnaswamy Stadium, Bengaluru
Umpires: Ankita Guha and Vrinda Rathi
Player of the match: Amanjot Kaur (Mumbai Indians)

- Mumbai Indians won the toss and elected to field.

Match 8
22 February 2025
19:30 (N)
Scorecard

UP Warriorz; 177/9 (20 overs)	v	Delhi Capitals; 144 (19.3 overs)
Chinelle Henry 62 (23); Jess Jonassen 4/31 (4 overs)		Jemimah Rodrigues 56 (35); Grace Harris 4/15 (2.3 overs)

UP Warriorz won by 33 runs
M. Chinnaswamy Stadium, Bengaluru
Umpires: Kaushik Gandhi and Keyur Kelkar
Player of the match: Chinelle Henry (UP Warriorz)

- Delhi Capitals won the toss and elected to field.

Match 9
24 February 2025
19:30 (N)
Scorecard

Royal Challengers Bengaluru; 180/6 (20 overs)	v	UP Warriorz; 180 (20 overs)
Ellyse Perry 90* (56); Tahlia McGrath 1/30 (3 overs)		Sophie Ecclestone 33 (19); Sneh Rana 3/27 (3 overs)

Match tied (UP Warriorz won the Super Over)
M. Chinnaswamy Stadium, Bengaluru
Umpires: Keyur Kelkar and Saiyed Khalid
Player of the match: Sophie Ecclestone (UP Warriorz)

- UP Warriorz won the toss and elected to field.
- Super Over: UP Warriorz 8/1, Royal Challengers Bengaluru 4/0

Match 10
25 February 2025
19:30 (N)
Scorecard

Gujarat Giants; 127/9 (20 overs)	v	Delhi Capitals; 131/4 (15.1 overs)
Bharti Fulmali 40* (29); Marizanne Kapp 2/17 (4 overs)		Jess Jonassen 61* (32); Kashvee Gautam 2/26 (4 overs)

Delhi Capitals won by 6 wickets
M. Chinnaswamy Stadium, Bengaluru
Umpires: Kaushik Gandhi and Ankita Guha
Player of the match: Jess Jonassen (Delhi Capitals)

- Delhi Capitals won the toss and elected to field.

Match 11
26 February 2025
19:30 (N)
Scorecard

UP Warriorz; 142/9 (20 overs)	v	Mumbai Indians; 143/2 (17 overs)
Grace Harris 45 (26); Nat Sciver-Brunt 3/18 (4 overs)		Nat Sciver-Brunt 75* (44); Deepti Sharma 1/25 (3 overs)

Mumbai Indians won by 8 wickets
M. Chinnaswamy Stadium, Bengaluru
Umpires: Kaushik Gandhi and Keyur Kelkar
Player of the match: Nat Sciver-Brunt (Mumbai Indians)

- Mumbai Indians won the toss and elected to field.

Match 12
27 February 2025
19:30 (N)
Scorecard

Royal Challengers Bengaluru; 125/7 (20 overs)	v	Gujarat Giants; 126/4 (16.3 overs)
Kanika Ahuja 33 (28); Tanuja Kanwar 2/16 (4 overs)		Ashleigh Gardner 58 (31); Renuka Singh Thakur 2/24 (4 overs)

Gujarat Giants won by 6 wickets
M. Chinnaswamy Stadium, Bengaluru
Umpires: Ankita Guha and Saiyed Khalid
Player of the match: Ashleigh Gardner (Gujarat Giants)

- Gujarat Giants won the toss and elected to field.

Match 13
28 February 2025
19:30 (N)
Scorecard

Mumbai Indians; 123/9 (20 overs)	v	Delhi Capitals; 124/1 (14.3 overs)
Harmanpreet Kaur 22 (16); Minnu Mani 3/17 (3 overs)		Meg Lanning 60* (49); Amanjot Kaur 1/12 (2 overs)

Delhi Capitals won by 9 wickets
M. Chinnaswamy Stadium, Bengaluru
Umpires: Kaushik Gandhi and Vrinda Rathi
Player of the match: Jess Jonassen (Delhi Capitals)

- Delhi Capitals won the toss and elected to field.

Match 14
1 March 2025
19:30 (N)
Scorecard

Royal Challengers Bengaluru; 147/5 (20 overs)	v	Delhi Capitals; 151/1 (15.3 overs)
Ellyse Perry 60* (47); Shikha Pandey 2/24 (4 overs)		Shafali Verma 80* (43); Renuka Singh Thakur 1/28 (4 overs)

Delhi Capitals won by 9 wickets
M. Chinnaswamy Stadium, Bengaluru
Umpires: Keyur Kelkar and Saiyed Khalid
Player of the match: Shafali Verma (Delhi Capitals)

- Delhi Capitals won the toss and elected to field.
- Delhi Capitals qualified for the playoffs as a result of this match.

Match 15
3 March 2025
19:30 (N)
Scorecard

Gujarat Giants; 186/5 (20 overs)	v	UP Warriorz; 105 (17.1 overs)
Beth Mooney 96* (51); Sophie Ecclestone 2/34 (4 overs)		Chinelle Henry 28 (14); Kashvee Gautam 3/11 (3 overs)

Gujarat Giants won by 81 runs
Ekana Cricket Stadium, Lucknow
Umpires: Narayanan Janani and Gayathri Venugopalan
Player of the match: Beth Mooney (Gujarat Giants)

- UP Warriorz won the toss and elected to field.

Match 16
6 March 2025
19:30 (N)
Scorecard

UP Warriorz; 150/9 (20 overs)	v	Mumbai Indians; 153/4 (18.3 overs)
Georgia Voll 55 (33); Amelia Kerr 5/38 (4 overs)		Hayley Matthews 68 (46); Grace Harris 2/11 (2 overs)

Mumbai Indians won by 6 wickets
Ekana Cricket Stadium, Lucknow
Umpires: Ajitesh Argal and Narayanan Janani
Player of the match: Hayley Matthews (Mumbai Indians)

- Mumbai Indians won the toss and elected to field.

Match 17
7 March 2025
19:30 (N)
Scorecard

Delhi Capitals; 177/5 (20 overs)	v	Gujarat Giants; 178/5 (19.3 overs)
Meg Lanning 92 (57); Meghna Singh 3/35 (4 overs)		Harleen Deol 70* (49); Shikha Pandey 2/31 (4 overs)

Gujarat Giants won by 5 wickets
Ekana Cricket Stadium, Lucknow
Umpires: Ajitesh Argal and Anish Sahasrabudhe
Player of the match: Harleen Deol (Gujarat Giants)

- Gujarat Giants won the toss and elected to field.
- UP Warriorz were eliminated as a result of this match.

Match 18
8 March 2025
19:30 (N)
Scorecard

UP Warriorz; 225/5 (20 overs)	v	Royal Challengers Bengaluru; 213 (19.3 overs)
Georgia Voll 99* (56); Georgia Wareham 2/43 (4 overs)		Richa Ghosh 69 (33); Sophie Ecclestone 3/25 (4 overs)

UP Warriorz won by 12 runs
Ekana Cricket Stadium, Lucknow
Umpires: Bhavesh Patel and Anish Sahasrabudhe
Player of the match: Georgia Voll (UP Warriorz)

- Royal Challengers Bengaluru won the toss and elected to field.
- Mumbai Indians and Gujarat Giants qualified for the playoffs as a result of this match while Royal Challengers Bangalore were eliminated.

Match 19
10 March 2025
19:30 (N)
Scorecard

Mumbai Indians; 179/6 (20 overs)	v	Gujarat Giants; 170 (20 overs)
Harmanpreet Kaur 54 (33); Priya Mishra 1/23 (3 overs)		Bharti Fulmali 61 (25); Amelia Kerr 3/34 (4 overs)

Mumbai Indians won by 9 runs
Brabourne Stadium, Mumbai
Umpires: Keyur Kelkar and Vrinda Rathi
Player of the match: Harmanpreet Kaur (Mumbai Indians)

- Gujarat Giants won the toss and elected to field.

Match 20
11 March 2025
19:30 (N)
Scorecard

Royal Challengers Bengaluru; 199/3 (20 overs)	v	Mumbai Indians; 188/9 (20 overs)
Smriti Mandhana 53 (37); Hayley Matthews 2/37 (4 overs)		Nat Sciver-Brunt 69 (35); Sneh Rana 3/26 (4 overs)

Royal Challengers Bengaluru won by 11 runs
Brabourne Stadium, Mumbai
Umpires: Ankita Guha and Saiyed Khalid
Player of the match: Sneh Rana (Royal Challengers Bengaluru)

- Mumbai Indians won the toss and elected to field.
- Delhi Capitals qualified for the final as a result of this match.

== Playoffs ==
=== Bracket ===
Eliminator

Final

1
Delhi Capitals
141/9 (20 overs)

2
Mumbai Indians
213/4 (20 overs)

EW
Mumbai Indians
149/7 (20 overs)

3
Gujarat Giants
166 (19.2 overs)

=== Eliminator ===
Eliminator
13 March 2025
19:30 (N)
Scorecard

Mumbai Indians; 213/4 (20 overs)	v	Gujarat Giants; 166 (19.2 overs)
Nat Sciver-Brunt 77 (41); Danielle Gibson 2/40 (4 overs)		Danielle Gibson 34 (24); Hayley Matthews 3/31 (3.2 overs)

Mumbai Indians won by 47 runs
Brabourne Stadium, Mumbai
Umpires: Kaushik Gandhi and Ankita Guha
Player of the match: Hayley Matthews (Mumbai Indians)

- Gujarat Giants won the toss and elected to field.

=== Final ===
Final
15 March 2025
20:00 (N)
Scorecard

Mumbai Indians; 149/7 (20 overs)	v	Delhi Capitals; 141/9 (20 overs)
Harmanpreet Kaur 66 (44); Marizanne Kapp 2/11 (4 overs)		Marizanne Kapp 40 (26); Nat Sciver-Brunt 3/30 (4 overs)

Mumbai Indians won by 8 runs
Brabourne Stadium, Mumbai
Umpires: Ankita Guha and Anish Sahasrabudhe
Player of the match: Harmanpreet Kaur (Mumbai Indians)

- Delhi Capitals won the toss and elected to field.

== Statistics ==
Most runs
Runs	Player	Team
523	Nat Sciver-Brunt	Mumbai Indians
372	Ellyse Perry	Royal Challengers Bengaluru
307	Hayley Matthews	Mumbai Indians
304	Shafali Verma	Delhi Capitals
302	Harmanpreet Kaur	Mumbai Indians

- Source: ESPNcricinfo

Most wickets
Wickets	Player	Team
18	Amelia Kerr	Mumbai Indians
18	Hayley Matthews	Mumbai Indians
13	Jess Jonassen	Delhi Capitals
12	Nat Sciver-Brunt	Mumbai Indians
12	Georgia Wareham	Royal Challengers Bengaluru

- Source: ESPNcricinfo
