= Vaishnavi Sharma =

Indian cricketer (born 2005)

Personal information
- Full name: Vaishnavi Narendra Sharma
- Born: 18 December 2005 (age 20); Gwalior, Madhya Pradesh, India
- Batting: Left-handed
- Bowling: Slow left-arm orthodox spin
- Role: Bowler

International information
- National side: India (2025–present)
- Only ODI (cap 158): 27 February 2026 v Australia
- ODI shirt no.: 2
- T20I debut (cap 89): 21 December 2025 v Sri Lanka
- Last T20I: 30 December 2025 v Sri Lanka
- T20I shirt no.: 2

Domestic team information
- Years: Team
- 2022–present: Madhya Pradesh
- 2026–present: Mumbai Indians

Career statistics
Competition	T20I	FC	LA	T20
Matches	4	3	15	17
Runs scored	–	52	36	11
Batting average	–	13.00	12.00	11.00
100s/50s	–/–	0/0	0/0	0/0
Top score	–	25	15	6
Balls bowled	90	715	772	354
Wickets	4	22	33	36
Bowling average	21.50	15.59	10.75	8.86
5 wickets in innings	0	3	1	2
10 wickets in match	0	1	0	0
Best bowling	2/24	8/50	5/34	5/3
Catches/stumpings	–/–	2/–	4/–	3/–
Medal record
Women's cricket
Representing India
U19 T20 World Cup
Winner	2025 Malaysia
- Source: ESPNcricinfo, 28 December 2025

Vaishnavi Narendra Sharma (born 18 December 2005) is an Indian international cricketer. She plays for the India women's national team as a left-arm orthodox spin bowler. Sharma was a part of the squad that won the 2025 U19 T20 World Cup and was the leading wicket-taker of the tournament.

== Early life ==
Sharma was born on 18 December 2005 in Gwalior, Madhya Pradesh, India. Her father Narendra Sharma works as a government employee. She has an elder brother who is an engineer. Sharma showed an interest in cricket at an early age and started training when she was five years old.

== Education ==
Sharma is a student of ITM University, Gwalior, where she is pursuing a Bachelor of Physical Education and Sports (B.P.E.S.).

== International career ==
Sharma was the leading wicket-taker at the 2025 U19 T20 World Cup where India retained its world champion title. She also became the first Indian bowler to take a hat-trick at the tournament. In December 2025, she got her maiden senior call up during the T20I series against Sri Lanka. Sharma made her T20I debut in the first match of the series. She received her debut cap from captain Harmanpreet Kaur.
