= Gunalan Kamalini =

Indian cricketer (born 2008)

Personal information
- Born: 20 July 2008 (age 18); Madurai, Tamil Nadu, India
- Batting: Left-handed
- Bowling: Legbreak
- Role: Wicket-keeper-batter

International information
- National side: India (2025–present)
- Only T20I (cap 90): 30 December 2025 v Sri Lanka
- T20I shirt no.: 16

Domestic team information
- Years: Team
- 2024–present: Tamil Nadu
- 2025–present: Mumbai Indians

Career statistics
Competition	T20I	FC	LA	T20
Matches	1	2	6	25
Runs scored	12	65	184	517
Batting average	12.00	21.66	30.66	32.31
100s/50s	–/–	0/0	0/2	0/2
Top score	12	27	91	95*
Balls bowled	–	30	–	–
Wickets	–	0	–	–
Bowling average	–	–	–	–
5 wickets in innings	–	–	–	–
10 wickets in match	–	–	–	–
Best bowling	–	–	–	–
Catches/stumpings	–/–	2/–	3/–	12/5
Medal record
Women's cricket
Representing India
Asian Games
Gold medal – first place	Aichi–Nagoya 2026
ACC Asia Cup
Winner	2026 UAE
ICC U19 World Cup
Winner	2025 Malaysia
- Source: Cricinfo, 31 December 2025

Gunalan Kamalini (born 20 July 2008) is an Indian international cricketer, who plays for the Indian women's national team. She made her Women's Twenty20 International debut against Sri Lanka in December 2025. At the domestic cricket level, she captained the Tamil Nadu Under-19 women's team to the national title in 2024 and also was the second-highest run-scorer in the tournament, with 311 runs in eight matches.

== Early life ==
Gunalan Kamalini was born on 20 July 2008 in Madurai, Tamil Nadu. In the third WPL auction in December 2024, Kamalini was purchased by the Mumbai Indians franchise for ₹ 1.6 crore.

== International career ==
In December 2025, she got her maiden senior call up during the T20I series against Sri Lanka. Kamalini made her T20I debut in the fifth match of the series.
