= Michell Pereira =

Sri Lankan cricketer (born 1982)

Personal information
- Full name: Jereleen Michell Pereira
- Born: August 12, 1982 (age 44); Trincomalee, Sri Lanka
- Batting: Left-handed
- Role: Wicket-keeper

Domestic team information
- Years: Team
- Colts Cricket Club
- Source: Cricinfo, 25 December 2017

Jereleen Michell Pereira (born 12 August 1982) is a Sri Lankan former cricketer now match referee. She was a member of the Sri Lankan cricket team at the 2005 Women's Cricket World Cup. In September 2024 she was named as a match referee as part of an all-female officiating group for the 2024 ICC Women's T20 World Cup.
