= Shafali Verma =

Indian cricketer (born 2004)

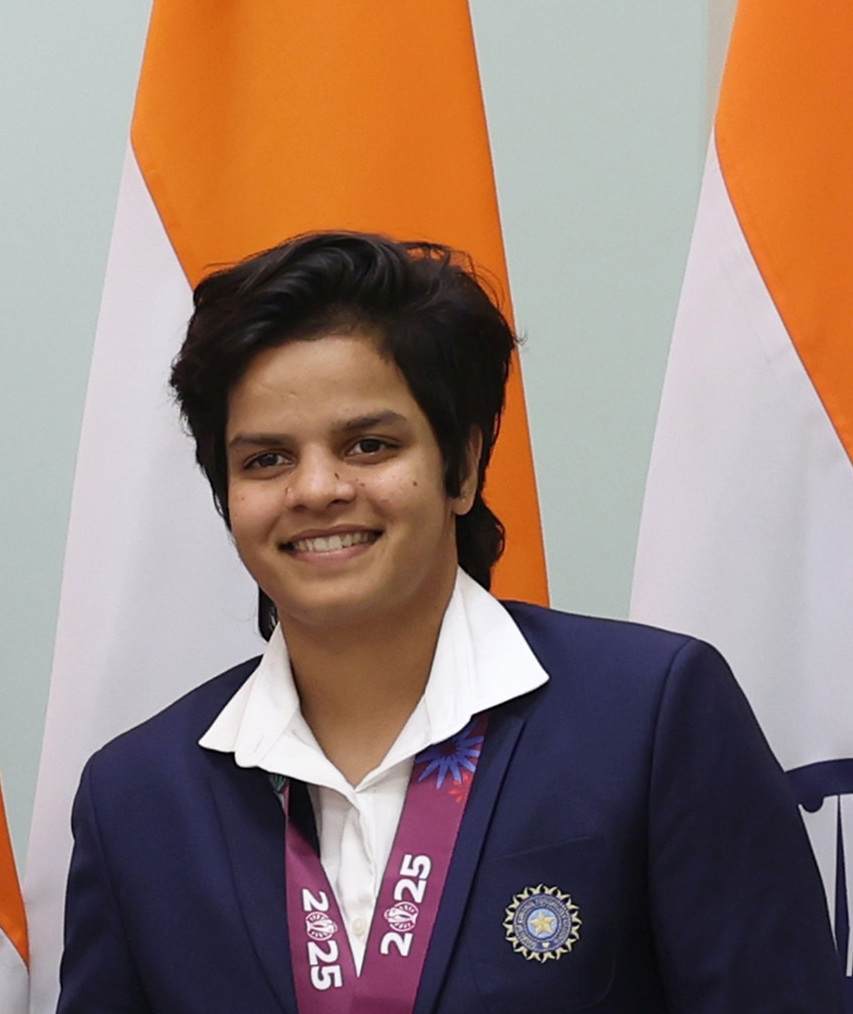
- Verma in 2025

Personal information
- Born: 28 January 2004 (age 22); Rohtak, Haryana, India
- Batting: Right-handed
- Bowling: Right-arm off-break
- Role: Batter

International information
- National side: India (2019–present)
- Test debut (cap 86): 16 June 2021 v England
- Last Test: 13 July 2026 v England
- ODI debut (cap 131): 27 June 2021 v England
- Last ODI: 28 October 2026 v Zimbabwe
- ODI shirt no.: 17
- T20I debut (cap 64): 24 September 2019 v South Africa
- Last T20I: 22 September 2026 v Sri Lanka
- T20I shirt no.: 17

Domestic team information
- Years: Team
- 2017/18–present: Haryana
- 2019–2022: Velocity
- 2021: Birmingham Phoenix
- 2021/22: Sydney Sixers
- 2023–present: Delhi Capitals

Career statistics
Competition	WTest	WODI	WT20I
Matches	7	35	122
Runs scored	640	868	3453
Batting average	49.23	27.12	30.55
100s/50s	1/3	0/7	1/23
Top score	205	87	100*
Balls bowled	-	126	102
Wickets	-	3	10
Bowling average	-	37.33	18.80
5 wickets in innings	-	0	0
10 wickets in match	-	0	0
Best bowling	-	2/36	3/15
Catches/stumpings	3/0	9/–	41/–
Medal record
Women's cricket
Representing India
ICC Cricket World Cup
Winner	2025 India
Commonwealth Games
Silver medal – second place	2022 Birmingham
Asian Games
Gold medal – first place	2022 Hangzhou
Gold medal – first place	2026 Aichi–Nagoya
ACC Asia Cup
Winner	2022 Bangladesh
Winner	2026 UAE
Runner-up	2024 Sri Lanka
ICC U19 T20 World Cup
Winner	2023 South Africa
- Source: Cricinfo, 30 October 2026

Shafali Verma (born 28 January 2004) is an Indian cricketer who plays for the Indian women's national team. In 2019, at the age of 15, she became the youngest cricketer to play in a Women's Twenty20 International (WT20I) match for India. In June 2021, she became the youngest player, male or female, to represent India in all three formats of international cricket. On 8 October 2022, she became the youngest cricketer to complete 1,000 runs in T20 Internationals. Under her captaincy, India won the 2023 Under-19 Women's T20 World Cup. She was named as Player of the Match in the finals of the 2025 Women's Cricket World Cup.

== Early life and education ==
Verma was born in Rohtak, Haryana, to father Sanjeev Verma and mother Parveen Bala. She has an older brother, Sahil, and a younger sister, Nancy (or Nensi). All three of them play cricket. Her father, "[a] die-hard cricket fan" who was unable to pursue cricket as a profession due to family pressure, is the proprietor of a small jewellery shop.

Verma began playing cricket at the age of eight. Her brother, a leg spinner, and her father would take her to a local ground to practise in the nets. In 2019, she told Hindustan Times:

"Both would bowl for long hours and I would hit the ball hard. That’s where I learnt this rule – if the ball is there to be hit then it should be hit hard."

In late 2013, Verma went, for the first time, to Chaudhary Bansi Lal Cricket Stadium in Lahli, a small town near Rohtak, with her father to see Mumbai playing a Ranji Trophy group fixture against Haryana. There, with Verma sitting on her father's shoulder, they watched Sachin Tendulkar featuring in his final domestic match; Verma cheered every time her idol scored.

At around that time, Verma's father took steps to enrol her in a cricket academy in Rohtak.

Initially, all of the Rohtak academies refused to admit Verma, because she was a girl. Eventually, on her father's instructions, she cut her hair short, and disguised herself as her brother. The two siblings looked alike and had similar hairstyles. Then, her father enrolled her, as a boy, in the Shree Ram Narain Cricket Academy.

Verma's father later told The Times of India that he had been scared someone would notice she was really a girl, but that no one had. "Nau saal ke umar mein saare bachche ek jaise hi lagte hain" ("At the age of nine, all children look the same"), he continued.

In 2020, Verma's first coach, Ashwani Kumar, a former Haryana first class cricketer who runs the academy, recounted:

"When she came to me first as a little kid ... I taught her the basic stance and after few days, she was comfortable hitting the big strokes. Then she started training with the girls four years elder to her and in six months’ times, she was practising with the U-14 boys. She never felt out of place."

Despite her successes at training, Verma had to endure mocking and taunts from neighbours and relatives about her involvement in a game they considered to be for boys. In response, she told her father that one day they would all be chanting her name.

Verma was also not permitted to compete in the academy's male-only tournaments. According to her father, "the organisers felt that she would get hurt," and so she further trained under his supervision instead. Verma also disguised herself as her brother once again when he was unable to participate in an U-12 cricket tournament due to illness. The Hindustan Times later observed that "Shafali ... played the entire tournament as Sahil ... amazing knocks in the 10-overs-a-side matches and even won the Player of the Tournament award."

Turning out against boys was still not ideal for Verma, however. According to her father:

"It was not easy for her to play against the boys as she often used to get hit on the helmet. On a few occasions, the ball even smashed her helmet grill. I used to get worried but she never gave up."

A solution presented itself when Verma began her secondary education in Class V at St. Paul School, Rohtak. The school's principal, Kalvinder Sidhu, was impressed by her enthusiasm and zeal for cricket, and asked the school coach Sunil Vats to establish a cricket academy for girls. Verma was less successful in the classroom, and failed her Class X exams. She then moved to Class X at Mandeep Senior Secondary School, Rohtak, which is run by the same management. As of 2019, she was hoping to re-sit the exams but was very busy playing cricket.

== Career ==
Before international cricket, she played for Velocity in the Women's T20 Challenge in which she scored 34 runs in 31 balls. In September 2019, she was named in India's Women's Twenty20 International (WT20I) squad for their series against South Africa. She made her WT20I debut for India at the age of fifteen, against South Africa, on 24 September 2019. She was the youngest player to play for India in a T20I match, and in November 2019 against the West Indies, became the youngest half-centurion for India in international cricket. Against the West Indies, she scored 158 runs in five matches, and was named the player of the series.

In January 2020, she was named in India's squad for the 2020 ICC Women's T20 World Cup in Australia, and was awarded with a central contract by the Board of Control for Cricket in India (BCCI). Ahead of the 2020 ICC Women's T20 World Cup, she was ranked as the number one batter in women's T20I cricket.

In May 2021, she was named in India's Test and Women's One Day International (WODI) squads for their series against the England women's cricket team. Verma made her Test debut on 16 June 2021, for India against England, scoring 96 runs in her first Test innings. The Test match was drawn, and Verma was named the player of the match after scoring 159 runs in her two innings. Verma made her WODI debut for India, against England, on 27 June 2021. She was signed by Birmingham Phoenix for the first season of The Hundred.

In July 2021, she played in India's tour of England. In the one-off Test, she was named the Player of the Match, scoring a 96 off 152 in the first innings then a 63 off 83 in the second. In the first ODI, she scored 15 off 14, then a crucial 44 off 55 in the second. In the third and last ODI, she scored 19 off 29. In the first T20, she was bowled off the second ball of the innings. In the second T20, she scored 48. In the third and final T20, she was once again bowled in the first over. She was the high scorer in Tests of the series, 7th in the ODIs, and finally 7th in T20s.

She played for Sydney Sixers in the 2021 WBBL, where she scored her maiden fifty against Hobart Hurricanes. In January 2022, she was named in India's team for the 2022 Women's Cricket World Cup in New Zealand. In July 2022, she was named in India's team for the cricket tournament at the 2022 Commonwealth Games in Birmingham, England.

In the 2023 Women's Premier League Auction, she was sold to Delhi Capitals for Rs 2 crore. In her first match against Royal Challengers Bangalore, she scored her maiden fifty, scoring 84 runs in just 45 balls.

In July 2024, she participated in a one-off test between India and South Africa. She scored 205 off 197, forming a 292 opening partnership (see below).

She was named in the India squad for the 2024 ICC Women's T20 World Cup and their home ODI series against New Zealand in October 2024.

She played a pivotal role in the 2025 ICC Women's World Cup victory. Brought in to replace an injured Pratika Rawal in the semi-final game against Australia, Shafali shone with her performance in the final against South Africa, top-scoring with 84 off 78 balls, setting the tone for a respectable total of 298 that India eventually compiled in their quota of 50 overs. She also rolled her arm over when defending the total and took two crucial wickets at an important juncture of the decider, to be adjudged the Player of the Match.

Shafali became the second Indian after former captain Mithali Raj to score a double century in Test cricket, nearly 22 years after Raj's feat. Mithali had scored 214 off 407 balls during the drawn second Test against England at Taunton in August 2002.Throughout her aggressive innings, Shafali struck an impressive 23 fours and eight sixes. She reached her milestone with back-to-back sixes off off-spinner Delmi Tucker, followed by a single. Her brilliant knock finally came to an end when she was run out for 205 off 197 balls.

At the 2026 Asian Games, in one match she became the first woman to score a century at any Asian Games, as well as the first female cricketer to score a T20I hundred while playing against Bangladesh, and the first Indian female cricketer to hit nine sixes in a T20I innings against a full-member nation (Bangladesh). She also set a new record for the most women’s T20I sixes in all (104) and the most in a single calendar year (35).

== Playing style ==
Verma is a right-handed opening batter with a prominent bat-swing who occasionally bowls right arm offbreaks. Mithali Raj, who later captained her in both domestic and international matches, first watched her playing in a domestic match between Haryana and Railways, during which Verma scored a half century. In mid 2024, Raj told Lavanya Lakshmi Narayanan, writing for Sportstar:

"She was a bit one-dimensional back then. She would score primarily on the onside. But she had raw power for a youngster."

In the same article, Narayanan observed:

"Starting out, Shafali was a twitchy teenager at the crease, constantly moving around in trying to find a way to dispatch the ball out of the ground. This also threw up errors in judgement of line and length at times which triggered a dismissal."

Early in her international career, Verma was noted to have "big-hitting prowess", a "fearless approach" and a "love" of 'playing in the V' (i.e. hitting to between long-off and long-on). She was also said to have a cover drive "from the book." According to Narayanan, she still had, as of 2024, "... the image of a trigger-happy six hitter ... [with a] quintessential Haryanvi swagger ... [and an] unfiltered quality." However, Narayanan also wrote:

"Much has changed about this Rohtak-born batter in her nascent career. She has learnt to expand her striking arc, worked on running between the wickets and a nagging weakness for the short ball, and even her hairstyles."

Verma herself said in mid 2021 that she tries "... to take lessons from every series and keep improving as a cricketer." She had also, she said, been encouraged by all of her national team-mates, coaches and support staff. During the COVID-19 pandemic, her coach Ashwini Kumar set up nets and a bowling machine for her in his backyard, so that she could have supplementary batting training. Additionally, in early 2021, she attended a training camp with the Haryana men's team, at which she was given assistance with her back-foot game, and in dealing with bouncers.

In March 2024, after leading her Capitals team to victory with a half century in a WPL match, Verma commented that she had changed a few things and felt more stable at the crease. Having previously struggled with consistency, she had learned from her Capitals captain, Meg Lanning, to score better, build her innings better, and bat longer. She also felt able to hit her shots clearly, and find gaps in the field, although she did not elaborate.

== See also ==
- List of centuries in women's Test cricket
- List of India women Test cricketers
- List of India women ODI cricketers
- List of India women Twenty20 International cricketers
