= Women's cricket =

Bat-and-ball game played by women

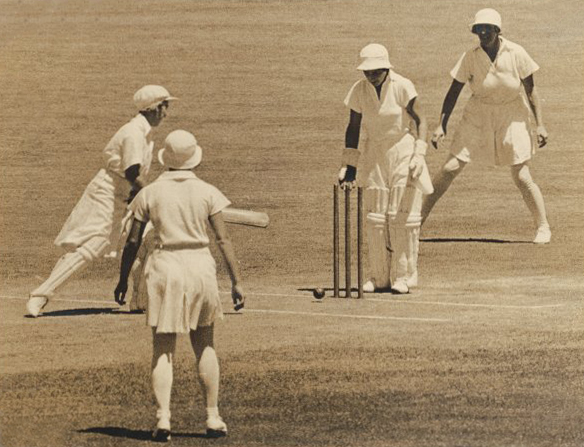
- Women playing cricket in 1935
- Highest governing body: International Cricket Council (formerly International Women's Cricket Council)
- First played: 26 July 1745, Surrey (first recorded)

Characteristics
- Contact: No
- Team members: 11 players per side (substitutes permitted in some circumstances)
- Mixed-sex: Women only
- Type: Team sport, Bat-and-Ball, women's sport
- Equipment: Cricket ball, Cricket bat, Wicket (Stumps, Bails), Protective equipment
- Venue: Cricket field
- Glossary: Glossary of cricket terms

Presence
- Country or region: Worldwide (most popular in the Commonwealth)
- Olympic: 2028

Women's cricket is the team sport of cricket when played by women. Its rules are almost identical to those in the game played by men, the main change being the use of a smaller ball. Women's cricket is beginning to be played at professional level in 11 of the 12 full members of the International Cricket Council (ICC), (Note: Women can no longer play cricket in Afghanistan following the 2021 Taliban takeover.) and is played worldwide, especially in Commonwealth nations.

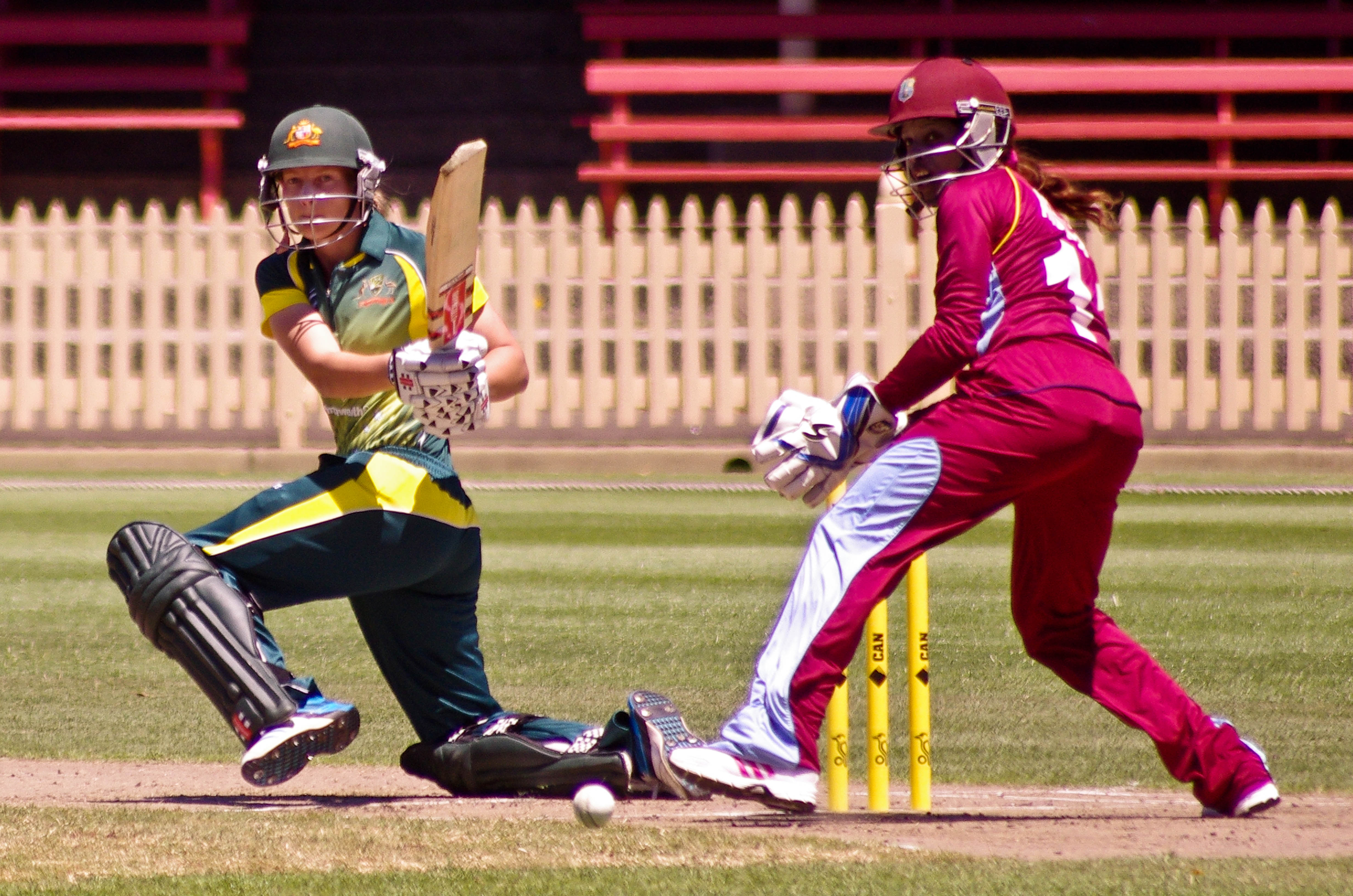
Australian batter Meg Lanning plays a sweep shot while Merissa Aguilleira of the West Indies keeps wicket during the 2014 West Indies tour of Australia at the North Sydney Oval.

The first recorded cricket match between women was held in England on 26 July 1745. The game continued to be played socially by women until clubs for women were formed in the late 1800s. In 1926, the creation of the Women's Cricket Association (WCA) in England began the process of formalising the game and organising international matches. Like many women's sports, the further development of women's cricket was hampered by sexism and a lack of structural support.

Although women have historically played Test cricket and first class cricket, the focus of the women's game in the last 50 years has been mostly on limited overs cricket. The introduction of Twenty20 cricket (T20) in 2003 created more opportunities for the growth of the women's game. As well as competing against each other in tours, national teams also compete in several tournaments, including the Cricket World Cup and the T20 World Cup. Women's cricket has also been part of several multi-sport events.

In domestic cricket, many countries have T20 cricket and List A cricket competitions that are run either alongside or separately from men's competitions. Grass roots cricket is growing, especially in England and Australia, although many barriers still remain. Cricket boards often organise competitions that use new formats that are intended to appeal to women. Cricket for women with disabilities is also growing, especially in South Asia.

== History ==
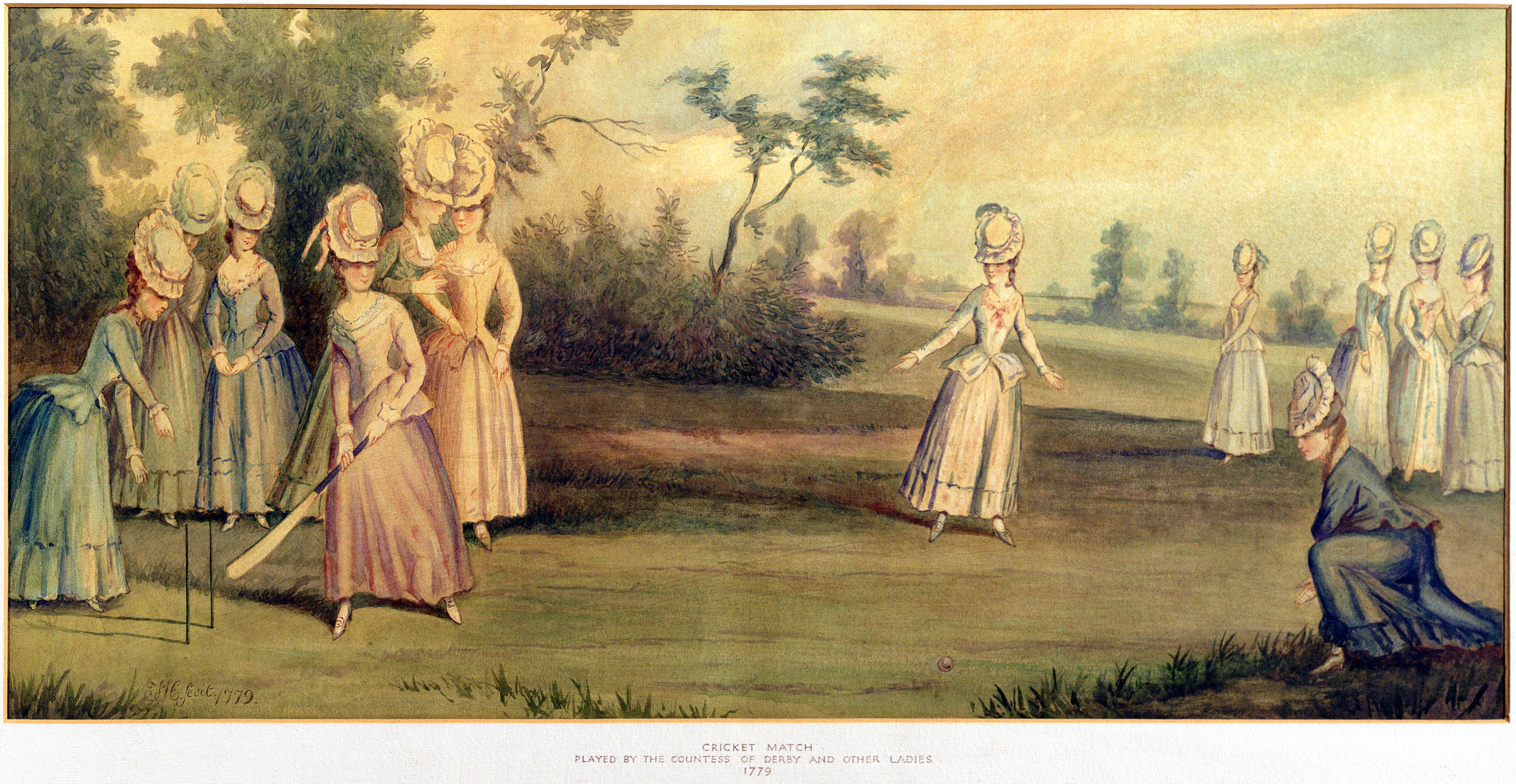
Watercolor painting from 1779 of a ladies cricket match played by Elizabeth Smith-Stanley, Countess of Derby and other women

The first recorded cricket match between women was reported in The Reading Mercury on 26 July 1745; the match was contested "between eleven maids of Bramley and eleven maids of Hambledon, all dressed in white". The first known women's cricket club the White Heather Club was formed in 1887 in Yorkshire. Three years later, a team known as the Original English Lady Cricketers toured England, reportedly making substantial profits before the manager absconded with the money.

In Australia, the first women's cricket league was set up by Lily Poulett-Harris in 1894 and Port Elizabeth, South Africa, had a women's cricket team named the Pioneers Cricket Club. In Canada, a women's cricket team in Victoria played at Beacon Hill Park.

In 1895 in the English socialist newspaper, The Clarion, edited by Robert Blatchford, there was a notice in the section 'Notes to Clarionettes.' to form a "Woman's Socialist Cricket Club". "Will any woman wishing to join communicate with Miss Mary Glen, 17, Praed St., London, W2.,"

In India, cricket teams for women existed as early as the 1920s. Delhi Ladies Cricket Club beat the men's Marylebone Cricket Club in a half-day game on their 1926–27 tour of India, one of the only matches they lost on the tour. Because it was a women's team, the game is omitted from records of the tour. During the 1950s and 1960s, cricket was strongest in the urban centres Chennai, Mumbai, Delhi and Kolkata. The most-notable club in this period is Albees in Mumbai; many Albees players were female family members of prominent men's Test cricketers.

In 1958, the International Women's Cricket Council (IWCC) was formed to co-ordinate women's cricket around the world, taking over from the English Women's Cricket Association (WCA), which had been working in a de facto role since its creation 32 years earlier. In 2005, the IWCC was merged with the International Cricket Council (ICC) to form a unified body to manage and develop cricket.

== Laws and gameplay ==
=== Language ===
Much of the language of cricket is heavily gendered; terms such as maiden over, nightwatchman, and third man are not officially sanctioned but remain in colloquial use. In 2021, the Marylebone Cricket Club (MCC) amended the rulebook, the Laws of Cricket, to replace the term "batsman" with the term "batter" to better reflect the modern game. There was some derision in parts of the cricketing and wider press but others responded that the term "batter" had been in widespread use through much of the 18th and 19th centuries.

=== Rule modifications ===
In The Laws of Cricket, the only explicit difference between men's and women's cricket is the ball size. According to The Laws of Cricket:

Clause 4.6.1 Women’s cricket
Weight: from 4.94 ounces/140 g to 5.31 ounces/151 g
Circumference: from 8.25 in/21.0 cm to 8.88 in/22.5 cm.

— Marylebone Cricket Club, The Laws of Cricket, 2017 Code (3rd Ed. 2022)

For comparison, the ball in the men's game should weigh between 5.5 and 5.75 oz (156 and 163 g), and be between 8.81 and 9 in (224 and 229 mm) in circumference. Many tournaments and forms of cricket, however, have additional differences in rules between women's and men's games.

The pitch and close infield is the same size in both the men's and women's games. The infield is smaller but, because the outfield is a range, there's an overlap between the largest women's field and the smallest men's field.

==== Test cricket ====
In the 2023 ICC rules, the main differences from the men's games are:

- Three umpires are sufficient in many cases, and they may be appointed by the Home Board (i.e., the country hosting the game). This is to increase the number of women umpires at the highest level. In the men's game, all four umpires must be appointed by the ICC from their list of Elite Umpires.
- Except for on the last day, play must continue until a minimum of 100 overs, or 17 overs per hour, have been completed. For the men's game, the minimum is 90 overs total or 15 per hour.
- On the last day, 83 overs (17 overs per hour) must be completed. The men's game mandates 75 overs (15 per hour).
- If play is delayed, e.g. because of rain, the minimum overs are reduced by one for each 3.52 minutes lost whereas in the men's game, the reduction is one over per four minutes of delay.
- Follow-on can be enforced with a lead of 150 runs. In a men's Test, the lead needed for a follow-on is 200 runs.
- Boundaries must not be "longer than 70 yards (64 metres), and no boundary should be shorter than 60 yards (54.86 metres) from the centre of the pitch". The boundaries in the men's game are larger with a minimum of 65 yards (59.43 metres) and a maximum of 90 yards (82.29 metres).
- A fielder who is absent for more than eight minutes may be penalised no more than 110 minutes. The maximum time penalty in the men's game is 120 minutes.

==== One Day International cricket ====
According to the June 2023 ICC rules for One Day International (ODI) matches, the main differences are:

- Umpires may be local, i.e., not from an impartial third country.
- The innings break can be between 30 and 45 minutes whereas in the men's game, any interval may be no longer than 30 minutes. The two drinks breaks are only 60 minutes apart instead of 70 minutes in the men's game.
- For a women's ODI, the game is expected to be two sessions of three hours and ten minutes with an over rate of 15.79 overs per hour. In the men's game, each session is expected to be three-and-a-half hours with an over rate of 14.28 per hour.
- As in Test cricket, the boundaries must be between 60 yards (54.86 metres) and 70 yards (64 metres).
- The same difference in penalty times for a fielder as in Test cricket.
- The infield is set at 25.15 yards (23 metres), whereas it is 30 yards (27.43 meters) for men.
- There's one powerplay that is identical to the men's first powerplay (10 overs with only 2 fielders in the outfield). After that, only four fielders are allowed in the outfield. Unlike the men's game, a women's ODI does not have a third powerplay with an additional fielder in the outfield. If the duration of the game is reduced, for example due to rain, the method of calculating the number of overs in the powerplay is slightly different between the two games.

==== Twenty20 International cricket ====
According to the June 2023 ICC rules, the main differences are:

- As with Test and ODI cricket, umpires may be local (i.e. not from an impartial third country).
- Intervals between innings are 15 minutes long compared to 20 minutes in a men's T20 match.
- The expectation is each session of a match will be of 75 minutes with a minimum over rate of 16 overs per hour. In the men's game, an over rate of 14.11 per hour is expected and each session is of 85 minutes.
- The boundaries are again set at between 60 yards (54.86 metres) and 70 yards (64 meters).
- Penalty time for a fielder absent from the field of play for more than eight minutes is a maximum of 35 minutes and for the men it is 40 minutes.
- The infield is set at 25.15 yards (23 metres) and is set at 30 yards (27.43 metres) for men.
- For overs that are not part of the powerplay, four fielders are permitted in the outfield whereas men are permitted five fielders.

=== Clothing and equipment ===
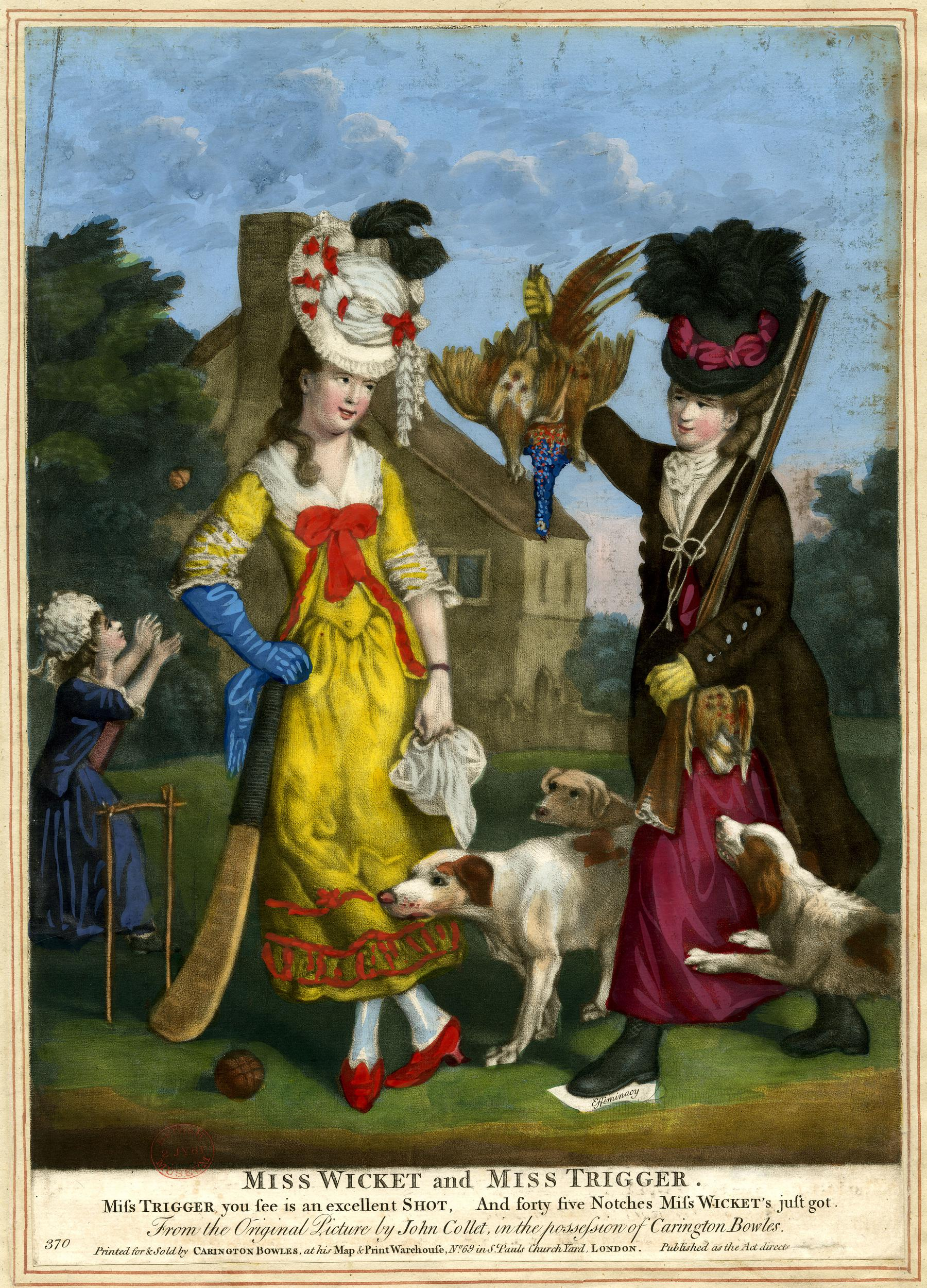
A satirical image of a woman cricketer and a woman hunter from 1778. They're both wearing late-Georgian fashion with satirically shortened hemlines and one treads on a piece of paper titled "effeminacy".

Initially, like men, women played cricket in clothes that were similar to their everyday wear. With changes in womenswear in the late Victorian period, clothes for middle-and-upper-class women to undertake physical activity became more available. The Rational Dress Society had an outfit for cricket in its 1883 catalogue.

During the interwar period, women's sportswear became more available and the Women's Cricket Association (WCA) encountered something they named "the clothing problem". The debate about what women should wear when playing cricket was intense; a debate about it can be found in the minutes of every Annual General Meeting of the WCA from its foundation until its last AGM before World War II. There was tension between the needs of female players who wished to wear comfortable, practical clothing, and the need to appear as "respectable" women to the public and to the male establishment who owned the cricket grounds. There was also anxiety about women cross-dressing and the need to maintain gender roles while playing sport.

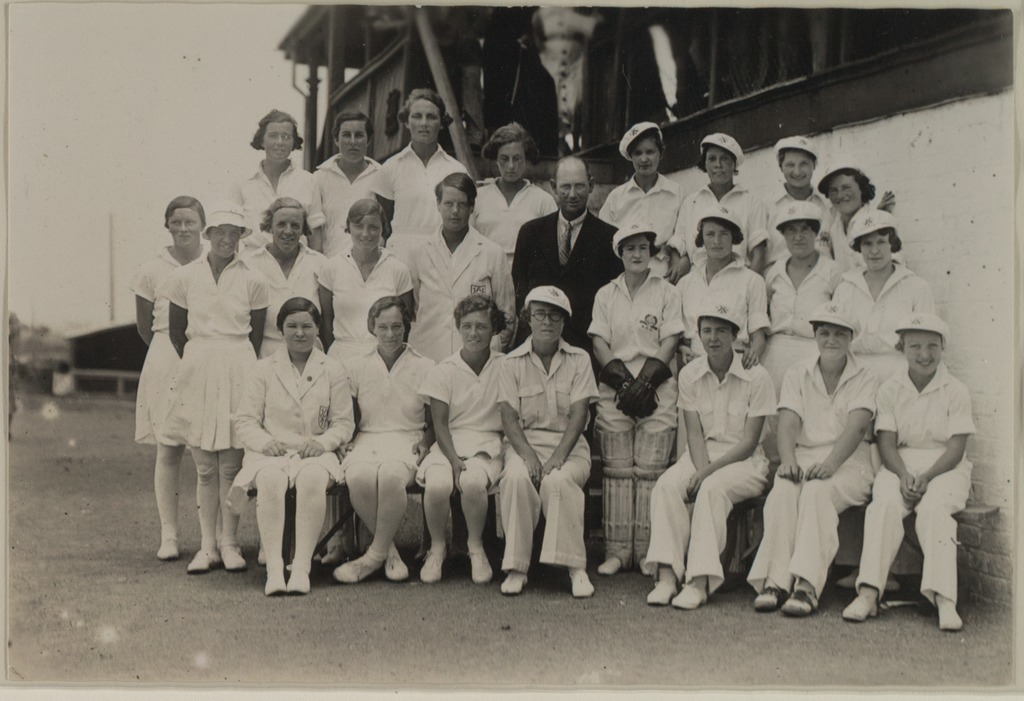
Photo from 1934–35 England tour of Australia and New Zealand. The England team (L) wear divided skirts and white stockings. The "Woollengong" (sic) women's cricket team wear trousers, something that was described at the time as disgraceful.

Photographs in the British press in the early 20th century often showed women playing cricket with bare legs and in bathing costumes but most played in more-practical clothing. Rules about women playing in white dresses and skirts were imposed on high-level women's cricket but in local games, it was common to play in flannels of any colour.

Following England's first tour of Australia and New Zealand, the England, Australia and New Zealand teams adopted the white divided skirts as part of their uniforms. England continued to play in skirts until 1997. Diving for the ball in a skirt risked injury and friction burns. The move to trousers eliminated this danger for women players, and the tan lines between the bottom of the skirts and the socks. The New Zealand team were given a sewing pattern and fabric, and were expected to make their uniforms or have them made.

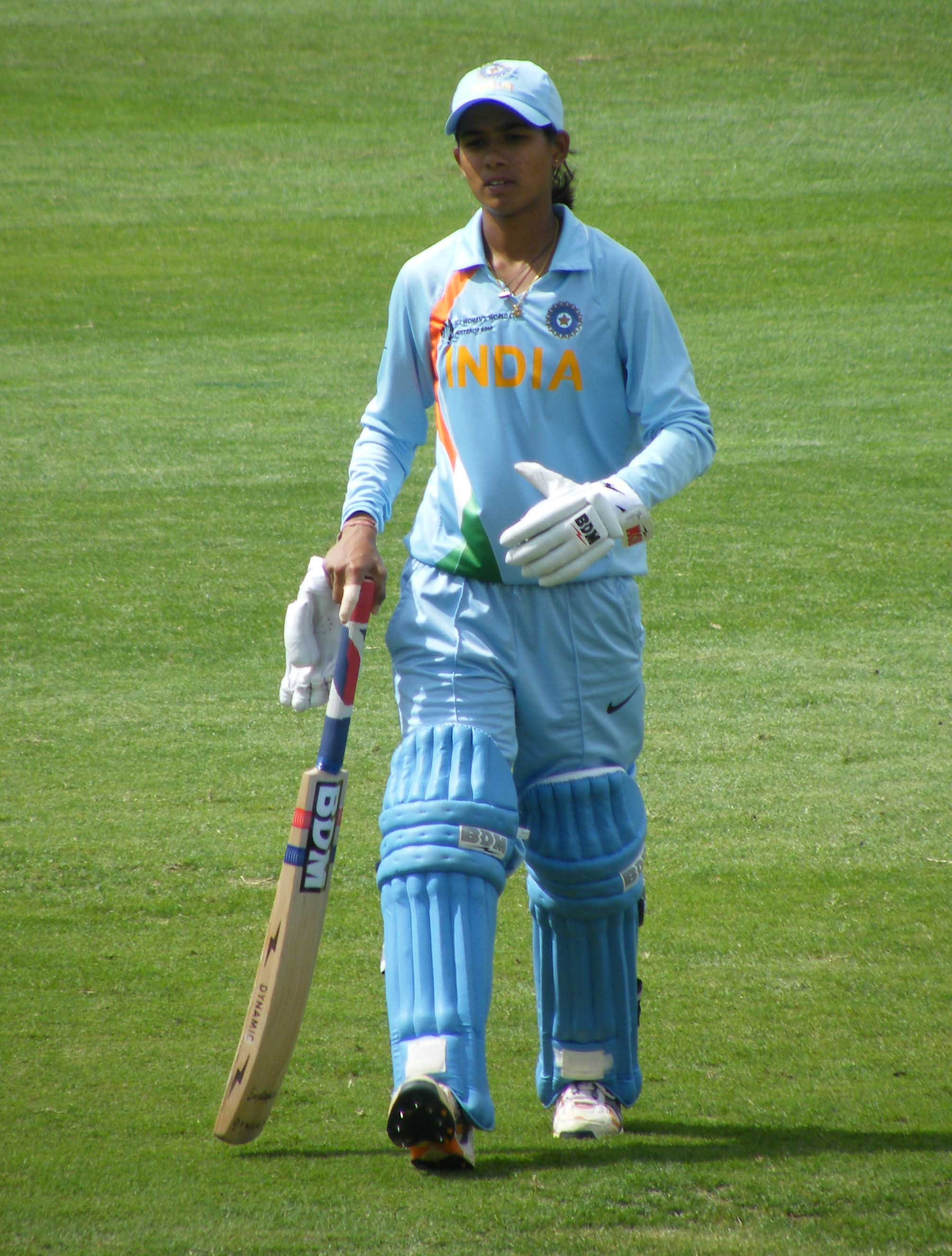
A member of the India team at the 2009 Women's Cricket World Cup. She wears the same trousers, long sleeve shirt and cap as the men's uniform.

According to the 2023 ICC rules, the rules on men's and women's attire in international cricket are identical. The only gender-specific clothing rule allows cricketers to wear hijab in ICC events provided it does not obscure any logos and names on the playing uniform. For Test matches, scarves must be black or white but for ODIs and T20s, they can be black or the same colour as the team cap but they cannot be white.

Appropriate equipment has long been an issue for women in cricket. Players have often had to use poorly fitting small men's or juniors equipment, which impeded performance. England wicket keeper Betty Snowball avoided this problem by having her gloves and pads custom made. Many women players prefer smaller, lighter bats. Labeling of equipment has been exclusionary; equipment for children has been labelled as "boys" but this has begun to change. Present and former cricketers, such as Lydia Greenway, Ellyse Perry and Heather Knight, have been involved with leading changes in the design of equipment for women. The brands Kookaburra, SM Cricket, Viking, Gray-Nicolls and JPGavan all now produce equipment intended for women. The brands NEXX and Lacuna Sports have been launched in the UK to provide clothing and equipment to women who play cricket.

== International cricket ==
Women's cricket has been played internationally since the inaugural women's Test match between England's and Australia's women's teams in December 1934. The following year, New Zealand joined them. in 2007 Netherlands became the tenth women's Test nation in their debut against South Africa. A total of 145 women's Test matches have been played.

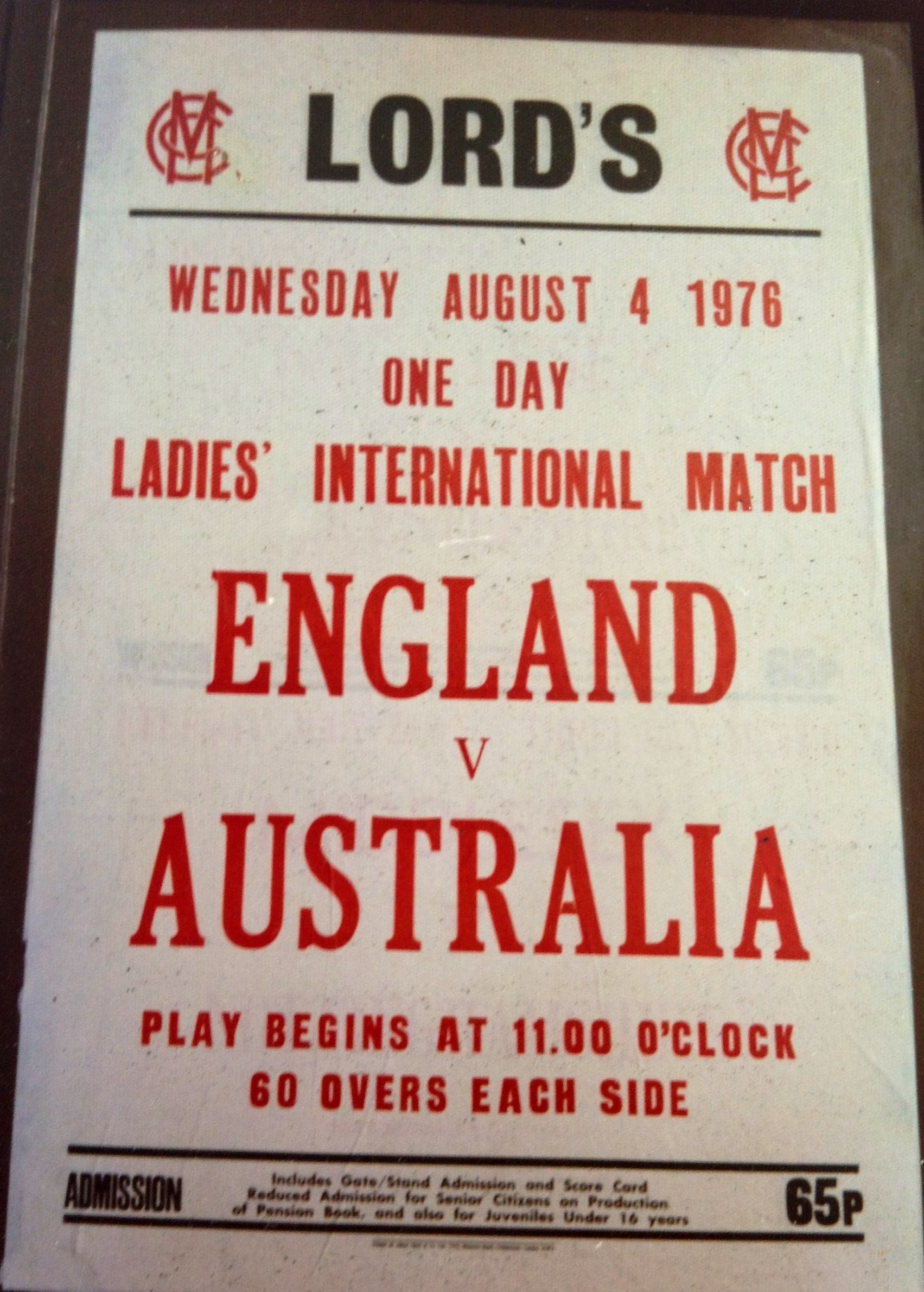
Advert for the first Women's One Day International game to be played at Lord's.

Women's One Day Internationals (ODIs) were introduced in 1973 at the inaugural Women's Cricket World Cup. The 1,000th women's ODI took place in 2016. Australia has dominated the format, having claimed the World Cup six times and won 80% of their matches.

In 2004, a shorter-still format, the Twenty20 International (T20I) was introduced; matches are restricted to twenty overs per side. Initially, women's T20 cricket was played little at international level; four matches were played by the end of 2006. The following three years saw a rapid growth in women's T20 Internationals; six matches were played in 2007, ten in 2008 and thirty in 2009, which also saw the first ICC Women's World Twenty20. In April 2018, the ICC granted its members full women's T20 International status.

In November 2021, the ICC retrospectively applied first-class and List A status to women's cricket, aligning it with the men's game.

In July 2023, the ICC announced equal prize money will be available for ICC global events, meaning future Women's Cricket World Cup and Women's T20 World Cup competitions will have the same prizes for winners and runners up as male competitions.

=== International rankings ===
The ICC maintains rankings of the 13 teams with ODI status and all teams who play T20I matches. As of August 2023, Australia top both tables.

ICC Women's ODI Team Rankings
Team	Matches	Points	Rating
Australia	31	5,085	164
England	29	3,653	126
India	33	4,114	125
South Africa	36	3,614	100
New Zealand	24	2,312	96
Sri Lanka	24	2,133	89
Pakistan	26	1,902	73
West Indies	29	2,085	72
Bangladesh	24	1,725	72
Ireland	25	1,120	45
Scotland	9	393	44
Netherlands	5	208	42
Thailand	7	248	35
Zimbabwe	25	349	14
United Arab Emirates	8	81	10
Papua New Guinea	12	37	3
Source: ICC Women's ODI Team Rankings, 28 October 2026

ICC Women's T20I Team Rankings
Team	Matches	Points	Rating
Australia	30	8,753	292
England	38	10,504	276
India	52	13,779	265
New Zealand	34	8,444	248
South Africa	43	10,588	246
Sri Lanka	47	11,203	238
West Indies	36	8,572	238
Pakistan	43	9,142	213
Ireland	44	8,921	203
Bangladesh	45	8,737	194
Scotland	40	6,723	168
Thailand	67	10,193	152
Papua New Guinea	33	4,660	141
Netherlands	50	7,058	141
United Arab Emirates	50	6,831	137
Zimbabwe	47	5,617	120
Uganda	61	6,739	112
Namibia	53	5,675	107
Tanzania	38	3,607	95
United States	35	3,316	95
Source: ICC Women's T20I Team Rankings, 14 November 2026

=== Series trophies ===
The men's game has a long history of perpetual trophies but there are two only in women's cricket: The Women's Ashes and The Rose Bowl.

In 1998, the Women's Cricket Association (WCA) created a set of Ashes to be contested by Australia and England. The Australia and England men's teams play for their own set of Ashes. In 2013, it changed from being a Test series to a series of ODIs, T20Is and a Test to better reflect the formats of cricket women regularly play.

The Rose Bowl is an ODI series played between Australia and New Zealand, and has been contested since the 1984–85 season, the most-recent being in 2020.

Before the start of the 2023–24 series, the Pakistan captain Nida Dar and South Africa captain Laura Wolvaardt revealed an as-yet-unnamed new trophy for their teams to contest.

=== Tournaments ===
==== Asia Cup ====
The Asia Cup began in 2004 as an ODI competition between members of the Asian Cricket Council (ACC). It initially ran every two years until 2008, then reformed in 2012 as a T20 tournament. The ACC intend to continue to run in it biannually, although on several occasions it has run every four years. The change to T20 cricket allowed the ACC to include more Associate nations in the tournament.

Women's Asia Cup Winners and Runner-ups
Rank	Country	Wins	style="background-color:silver;"
1	India	8	2
2	Bangladesh	1	0
3	Sri Lanka	1	6
4	Pakistan	0	2
Updated as of the end of the 2026 Women's Twenty20 Asia Cup

==== Cricket World Cup ====
The first ever Cricket World Cup was the Women's Cricket World Cup organised in 1973 by the WCA; it was based on an idea of cricketer Rachael Heyhoe Flint and businessman Jack Hayward. After the success of the Women's Cricket World Cup, the men's tournament took place two years later.

Seven teams competed in the inaugural tournament, which took place in England over five and a half weeks. Each ODI match was 60 overs and every team played each other in a round-robin league format. Subsequent tournaments were hampered by lack of funds for women's teams, meaning their scheduling was inconsistent for many years. The 1997 World Cup was the first to be played with 50 overs and a knock-out stage.

Since the inaugural tournament, there have been 12 World Cups with the 13th planned for 2025 in India.

Women's Cricket World Cup Winners and Runner-ups
Rank	Country	Wins	Runners-up	Total Appearances
1	Australia	7	2	13
2	England	4	4	13
3	New Zealand	1	3	13
4	India	1	2	11
5	South Africa	0	1	8
6	West Indies	0	1	7
Updated as of the end of the 2025 Women's Cricket World Cup.

==== European Cricket Championship ====
Women's European Cricket Championship Winners and Runner-ups
Rank	Country	Wins	Runners-up	Total Appearances
1	England	8	1	12
2	Ireland	3	6	12
3	Netherlands	1	3	12
4	Denmark	0	2	5
Updated as of the end of the 2014 tournament.

==== Kwibuka T20 Tournament ====
Originally called the "Kwibuka Cricket for Peace Women's T20 Tournament", the Kwibuka T20 Tournament is an annual T20 tournament that is played in Rwanda. It was founded in 2014 to mark the 20th anniversary of the Rwandan genocide and to promote peace through cricket. It is unusual among women's tournaments because there is no male equivalent. African nations including Botswana, Kenya, Namibia, Nigeria, Tanzania and Uganda, and the hosts Rwanda compete in the tournament. The Brazilian and German teams have also taken part.

The word 'Kwibuka' means "to remember" in Kinyarwanda, the Rwandan national language, and is the title of annual commemorations of the genocide.

Kwibuka T20 Tournament Champions and Runner-ups
Rank	Country	Champions	Runners-up	Apps.
1	Kenya	4	1	7
2	Uganda (Note: Uganda's statistics include the results of the Uganda under-19 and under-23 teams.)	3	5	10
3	Tanzania	3	0	3
4	Rwanda	1	3	12
5	Zimbabwe (Note: Zimbabwe's statistics include the results of Zimbabwe A and Zimbabwe High Performance XI.)	1	2	3
6	Namibia	0	1	1
Updated as of the end of the 2026 Tournament.

==== T20 World Cup ====
Women's T20 World Cup Winners and Runner-ups
Rank	Country	Wins	Runners-up	Total Appearances
1	Australia	7	1	10
2	England	1	4	10
3	New Zealand	1	2	10
4	West Indies	1	0	10
5=	India	0	1	10
5=	South Africa	0	2	10
Updated as of the end of the 2026 Women's T20 World Cup.

=== At multi-sport events ===
Following the introduction of T20 cricket, cricket has been included at several multi-sport events; the women's game is often added after the successful establishment of a men's tournament. As of August 2023, five different major games have held women's cricket medal events; a sixth – the African Games – is scheduled for early 2024 and a seventh – the Olympics – is scheduled for 2028.

==== African Games ====
The 2023 African Games in Accra, Ghana will mark the game's debut in the African Games.

African Games Women's Cricket Medal Table
Rank	Nation	Gold	Silver	Bronze	Total
Totals (0 entries)		0	0	0	0

==== Asian Games ====
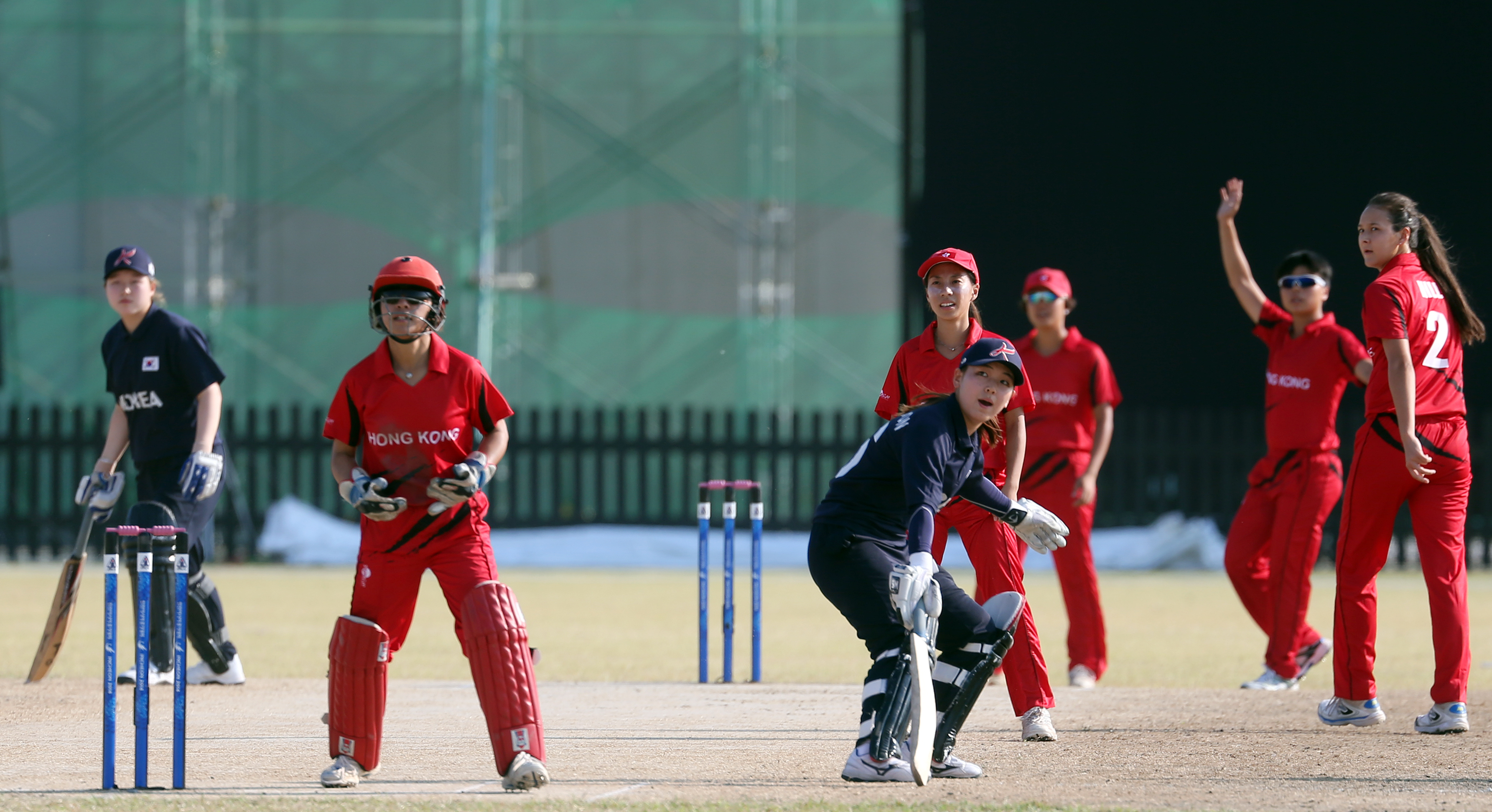
Hong Kong playing South Korea at the Yeonhui Cricket Ground in Incheon, South Korea during the 2014 Asian Games.

Cricket made its debut at the 2010 Asian Games in Guangzhou, China, with men's and women's T20 cricket matches. It returned for the 2014 Asian Games Cricket was removed from the 2018 Asian Games to reduce the burden on the Indonesian organisers.

The 2022 Asian Games were delayed because of the COVID-19 pandemic but cricket returned when the Games were held in September 2023. Eight teams competed, including India who sent a team to the games for the first time and went home with their first gold medal.

Asian Games Women's Cricket Medal Table
Rank	Nation	Gold	Silver	Bronze	Total
1	Pakistan	2	0	1	3
2	India	2	0	0	2
3	Bangladesh	0	2	1	3
3	Sri Lanka	0	2	1	3
5	Japan	0	0	1	1
Totals (5 entries)		4	4	4	12

==== Commonwealth Games ====
In August 2019, the Commonwealth Games Foundation announced the addition of women's cricket to the 2022 Commonwealth Games. The matches were held at Edgbaston, and included eight teams competing in a T20 format during July and August 2022. Only a women's tournament was part of the Games.

Commonwealth Games Women's Cricket Medal Table
Rank	Nation	Gold	Silver	Bronze	Total
1	Australia	1	0	0	1
2	India	0	1	0	1
3	New Zealand	0	0	1	1
Totals (3 entries)		1	1	1	3

==== Olympic Games ====
Women's cricket has never been included in the Olympic Games. There was hope T20 cricket would be included in the 2028 Summer Olympic Games in Los Angeles. It was on the shortlist for inclusion but was not chosen for the 28-sport provisional list, making its inclusion unlikely. The ultimate decision was made in October 2023 at a meeting of the International Olympic Committee Executive board by the nod of inclusion of cricket in 2028.

With the 2032 Summer Olympics being hosted in Brisbane, Australia, the governing body Cricket Australia have also noted their intention to have the game included.

==== Pacific Games ====
Men's cricket has been part of the Pacific Games since 1979 and a women's competition was introduced for the 2015 Pacific Games in Port Moresby, Papua New Guinea. It appeared again at the 2019 Pacific Games but was dropped for the 2023 games.

Pacific Games Women's Cricket Medal Table
Rank	Nation	Gold	Silver	Bronze	Total
1	Samoa	2	0	0	2
2	Papua New Guinea	0	2	0	2
3	Fiji	0	0	1	1
3	Vanuatu	0	0	1	1
Totals (4 entries)		2	2	2	6

==== South Asian Games ====
Women's cricket made its debut at the 2019 South Asian Games in Pokhara, Nepal, in the T20 format. The Maldives set one of the lowest scores in International Women's Cricket, all out for 8 runs.

South Asian Games Women's Cricket Medal Table
Rank	Nation	Gold	Silver	Bronze	Total
1	Bangladesh	1	0	0	1
2	Sri Lanka	0	1	0	1
3	Nepal	0	0	1	1
Totals (3 entries)		1	1	1	3

==== Southeast Asian Games ====
Cricket made its debut at the 2017 Southeast Asian Games in Kuala Lumpur, Malaysia. It did not appear in another Southeast Asian Games until the 2023 Games.

Unusually among modern multi-sport events, the SEA Games do not keep to just the T20 format. For the 2017 tournament, women only played T20 but for the 2023 tournament they competed in 6s, T10, T20 and 50-over competitions and each had medals available.

Southeast Asian Games Women's Cricket Medal Table
Rank	Nation	Gold	Silver	Bronze	Total
1	Thailand	4	0	0	4
2	Indonesia	1	3	0	4
3	Philippines	0	2	0	2
4	Malaysia	0	0	4	4
5	Myanmar	0	0	1	1
Totals (5 entries)		5	5	5	15

== Domestic ==
The majority of high-level women's domestic cricket in ICC Full Member countries consists of 50-over and Twenty20 competitions.

=== Afghanistan ===
Since the 2021 Taliban offensive and the Fall of Kabul in 2021, cricket for women is in practice banned due to the Taliban's policies on women.

=== Australia ===
Eight state-based teams play 50-over cricket in the Women's National Cricket League, which has run since the 1996–97 season. Since the 2015–16 season, eight city-based franchises have played T20 cricket in the Women's Big Bash League.

=== Bangladesh ===
The Bangladesh Women's National Cricket League has been played variously as a 50-over and a Twenty20 competition.

=== England ===
Eight regional teams compete in the 50-over Rachael Heyhoe Flint Trophy and the Twenty20 Charlotte Edwards Cup, while eight city-based teams compete in The Hundred, a 100-ball cricket competition. The English counties play in the Women's Twenty20 Cup.

Previously, the English counties played in the Women's County Championship, while six semi-professional teams played in the Women's Cricket Super League.

To grow women's participation in the game, including those who have never played cricket, in 2017, the England and Wales Cricket Board created a format called softball cricket. It uses a modified scoring system, has 6-to-8 players per team and lasts just over an hour. It has a more-relaxed playing style than hardball cricket; for example underarm bowling is allowed and more-complicated rules such as leg before wicket are not included. Conventional cricket played by women is occasionally called "women's hardball cricket" to distinguish it from softball cricket.

=== India ===
Several domestic women's cricket competitions exist in India. State teams play for the 50-over Women's Senior One Day Trophy and the Women's Senior T20 Trophy, while composite teams play for the 50-over Senior Women's Challenger Trophy and the Women's Senior T20 Challenger Trophy. Domestic first-class women's cricket was last played in India in the form of the Senior Women's Cricket Inter Zonal Three Day Game, which ended after the 2017–18 season. The domestic red-ball game for women has been revived in the 2023-24 season with the Senior Women's Inter-Zonal Multi-Day Trophy. A total of six zonal teams competed in a knockout format.

In 2018, women's franchise cricket in India began with the Women's T20 Challenge, which began as a two-team competition. The following year, the competition was expanded to a three-team tournament. The Women's Premier League, a five-team franchise T20 competition, was created in 2023 to replace the T20 Challenge.

=== Ireland ===
The Women's Super Series in Ireland in contested by three teams. From 2021, the competition has been split into separate 50-over and Twenty20 sections.

=== New Zealand ===
Six regional-based teams compete in the 50-over Hallyburton Johnstone Shield, which has existed since the 1935–36 season, and the Twenty20 Super Smash, which began in the 2007–08 season.

=== Pakistan ===
The 50-over Pakistan Women's One Day Cup has run since the 2017–18 season while the PCB Women's Twenty20 Tournament began in the 2019–20 season. Previously, state and departmental teams competed in the National Women's Cricket Championship, the Women's Cricket Challenge Trophy and the Departmental T20 Women's Championship.

=== South Africa ===
Provincial teams play in the 50-over CSA Women's Provincial Programme, previously the CSA Women's Provincial One-Day Tournament, which has run since the 1995–96 season, and in the CSA Women's Provincial T20 Competition. which began during the 2012–13 season. Since 2019, composite teams have played in the Women's T20 Super League.

In August 2023, Cricket South Africa announced a new structure for domestic cricket. It will be composed of six teams that will have increased funding to professionally contract more players and hire full-time coaching staff.

=== Sri Lanka ===
The 50-over competition is the Sri Lanka Women's Division One Tournament. Several Twenty20 competitions have taken place, including the Super Provincial T20 Tournament and the Super 4 Twenty20 Competition.

=== West Indies ===
The nations that make up the West Indies have competed in the Women's Super50 Cup since 1975 and in the Women's Twenty20 Blaze since 2012.

In 2022, Cricket West Indies and the Caribbean Premier League jointly launched two women's competitions: a T10 cricket competition called The 6ixty and the Women's Caribbean Premier League, both with three teams that are aligned with men's sides. The 6ixty was partly inspired by the women's exhibition T10 matches that were played just before the 2019 Caribbean Premier League playoff matches.

=== Zimbabwe ===
The 50-over competition is the Fifty50 Challenge and the Twenty20 competition is the Women's T20 Cup, both of which are competed for by four teams that are aligned with men's sides.

== Disability cricket ==
=== Blind cricket ===
Women are known to have been playing blind cricket in Australia since at least the 1940s, when they competed with and against men.

England and Nepal have had women's international teams since at least November 2014, when Nepal beat England 3-0 in a three game series. In 2018, England toured the West Indies and won the series 4–1.

The first international series played in Pakistan was held in January and February 2019. The Pakistan Blind Cricket Council formed a national women's team in 2018 that played the Nepalese blind women's team in five T20 games. The Pakistani team were publicly supported by Sana Mir and other professional cricketers. Nepal won the series 4–0.

In 2019, the Cricket Association for the Blind in India created a blind cricket league for women consisting of teams from seven states. Odisha won the inaugural tournament, beating Karnataka 218/8 (20.0) to Karnataka's 131/8 (20.0). The 2020 and 2021 tournaments were cancelled because of the COVID-19 pandemic. It expanded to 14 states for the 2022 tournament, which was won by Karnataka. The 2023 tournament had 18 teams. Odisha regained the title.

India formed a national team in 2020 but had to cancel its intended 2021 tour of England because of the COVID-19 pandemic. Their first tour was in Nepal in April 2023. Nepal won that series 3–1.

The 2023 IBSA World Games in Birmingham, England, included cricket for the first time and India was the first country to announce it would be sending a team. England and Australia also sent teams to the Games; it was the Australian team's international debut. The Pakistani team was unable to participate due to lack of funds. India was the first team to reach the finals by winning their first three matches and won all four matches of their group games. Australia won the other place with a higher net run rate than England. India beat Australia in the final and were publicly praised by Indian Prime Minister Narendra Modi.

== Records ==
Cricket values records and statistics. Women's records have often been overlooked, especially when a women's record precedes or exceeds a men's record. For example, Belinda Clark made the first double century in ODI cricket in the 1997 World Cup, 13 years earlier than Sachin Tendulkar's 200* in 2010. Betty Wilson became the first player to score a century and take ten wickets in a Test match in 1958. Ian Botham did not achieve this until 1980.

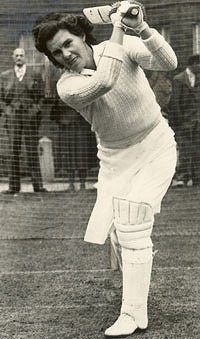
Betty Wilson, the woman with the highest bowling average in Test cricket, photographed in 1951. She was also the first cricketer of either sex to score a ten-wicket haul and a century in a single Test.

=== Test cricket ===
Among Test nations, Australia holds the record for the most wins, having won 21 of their 77 Test matches.

The all-time-leading women's Test batter is Denise Annetts of Australia with a Test batting average 81.90. As of 2023, she is third behind Don Bradman's famous 99.94 and Saud Shakeel's current 87.50. (Note: Criterion for inclusion on the women's record list is to have batted 10 Test innings. All three meet this criterion but Shakeel has yet to reach the 20 innings needed for inclusion on the men's record list.)

The player with the highest bowling average is Australian Betty Wilson with an average of 11.80. This puts her second to the 10.75 of George Lohmann.

== See also ==
- Lists of women Test cricketers
- Lists of women One Day International cricketers
- Lists of women Twenty20 International cricketers
- ICC Women's Player Rankings
