= Stump gauge =

A stump gauge (or wicket gauge) is an instrument used in cricket to determine the correct position for the three stumps used to form the wicket, as mandated by the Laws of Cricket. It is usually in a form of a metal (although sometimes plastic) bar with three spikes, and is used to locate and create the holes into which the spiked ends of the stumps are placed.

== See also ==
- Ball gauge
