= Ball gauge =

Instrument to check size of cricket ball

A ball gauge is an instrument used by the umpires in cricket to check whether the size of a cricket ball meets the standard measurements mandated by the Laws of Cricket. It is usually in a form somewhat like a pair of handcuffs with two connected rings: one ring has the minimum acceptable diameter, through which the ball should not pass; the other ring has the maximum acceptable diameter, through which the ball should pass. The gauge that accepts the maximum size is called 'GO gauge', and the gauge doesn't allow the dimension beyond a certain value is called ' NOGO gauge'. If the ball cannot pass through the maximum diameter, or passes through the minimum diameter, or becomes mis-shapen, the umpires should replace the ball. The replacement ball is ideally an old ball that was used in a previous match for a comparable number of overs as the ball being replaced, so that it has had approximately the same amount of use and wear as the old ball.

== See also ==
- Stump gauge
