= Violet Westbrook =

English cricketer (1871 – 1945)

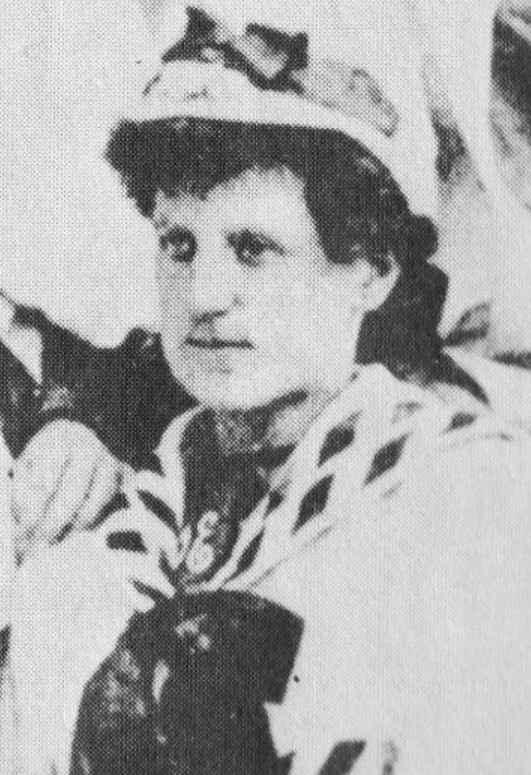
Violet Westbrook in the team uniform of the Original English Lady Cricketers in 1890

Violet Westbrook, real name Violet Blanche Lyon (1871 – 1945), was a captain in the Original English Lady Cricketers, the first semi-professional women’s cricket team in England.

Violet was born in Godalming, Surrey on 23 July 1871, the daughter of a stationer, and learned to play cricket with her brothers. She and her younger sister Grace both joined the Original English Lady Cricketers in 1890 and adopted pseudonyms on the advice of the syndicate secretary.

The OELC consisted of two teams which toured the country putting on exhibition matches between 1890 and 1892. Violet captained the Red team against Daisy Stanley’s Blue team. Violet was considered the best all-round player of the OELC, with her fast bowling and fielding being praised.

After her stint with the OELC, Violet continued living with her parents and worked as a typist. In 1903, she married Philip John Seale, a clerk, and they had two children. After Philip's death in 1939, Violet ran a shop. She died on 8 August 1945 in Chelmsford.
