= Original English Lady Cricketers =

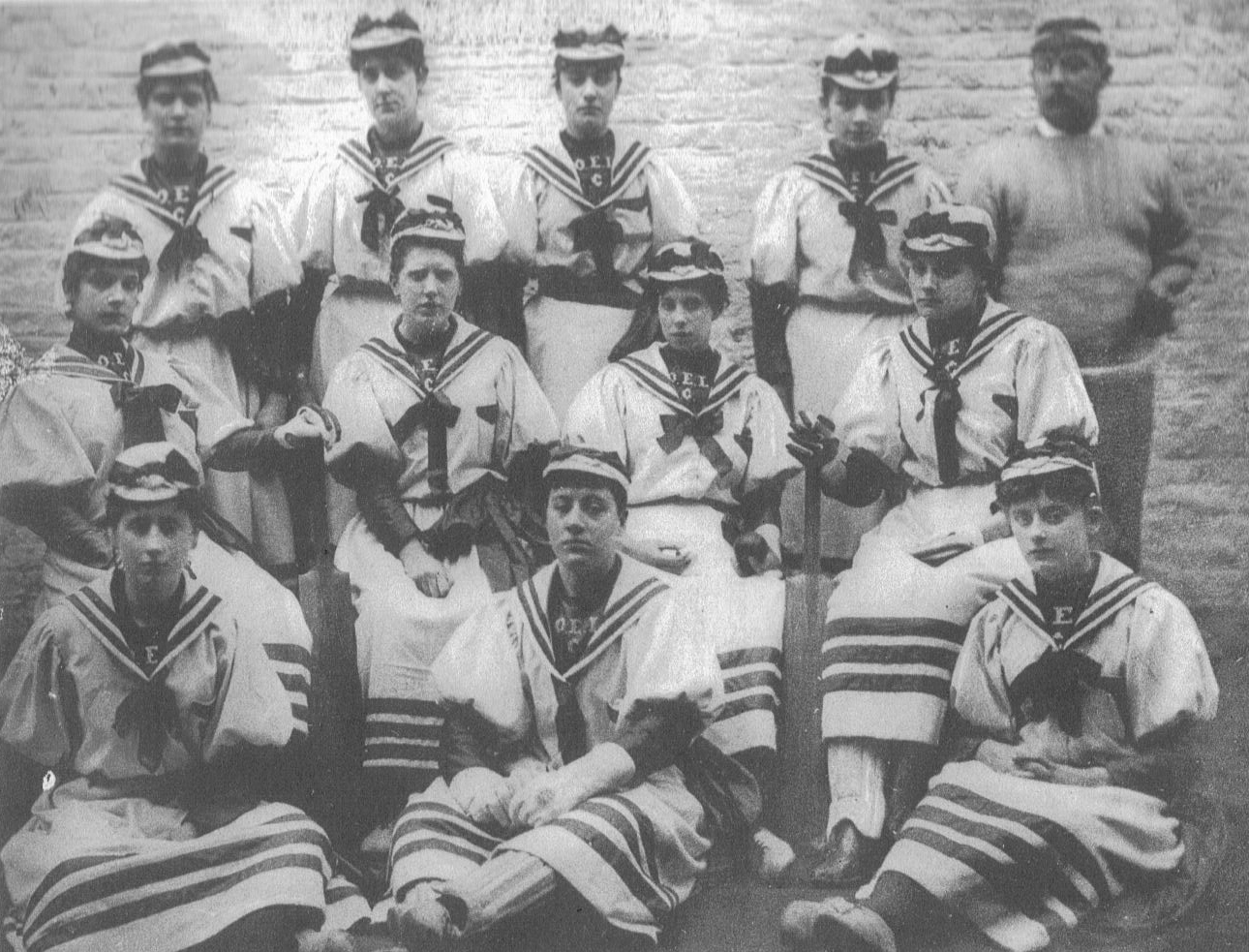
The Original English Lady Cricketers from James Lillywhite's Cricketers' Annual for 1890

The Original English Lady Cricketers were the first recorded paid women's cricket teams. They toured Great Britain between 1890 and 1892.

The Cricketers were formed in 1889 by French-American entrepreneur Mr. E. Michael after he advertised for young single women "of good address and appearance, respectable, strong, active, not under 5ft. 6in. in height or over twenty-two years of age." Consisting of thirty players divided into a 'Red XI' and a 'Blue XI' captained by Violet Westbrook and Daisy Stanley, with an average of nineteen, the Cricketers played over sixty exhibition games throughout Britain in the summer of 1890, with each match reportedly drawing over 2,000 paying spectators. The first game, played at the Athletic Police Ground in Liverpool on 7 April 1890, attracted over 15,000 people, although games were often accompanied by other entertainments including animal performances. After public interest declined the managers absconded with the funds and the team was disbanded.

== Reception ==
Most women's cricket at the time was played behind closed doors at colleges such as Royal Holloway and Bedford College. While a matron was hired to chaperone all the Cricketers' engagements, and playing outfits were designed to limit bare skin, the press largely reacted negatively to the venture. The fact players were paid was deemed socially unacceptable to many journalists at a time when amateurism dominated English sport, while others journalists believed women's cricket was evidence of "feminine muscularity getting just a shade too rampant." W. G. Grace commented that they had been a dismal failure, concluding "cricket is not a game for women and although they occasionally join in a picnic game they are not constitutionally adapted for the sport."

Marjorie Pollard of the Women's Cricket Association, an anti-commercial and pro-amateur organisation, wrote in the 1934 that the Cricketers "‘savoured of exploitation, and was not a genuine effort to provide cricket as a summer game."
