= Playing time (cricket) =

Duration of a cricket match

Games in the sport of cricket are played over a number of hours or days, making it one of the sports with the longest playing time, though sailing, yachting, road cycling, and rallying are sometimes longer. Typically, Test and first-class cricket matches are played over three to five days with, at least, six hours of cricket being played each day. Limited overs formats of cricket take place in one day, with List A matches lasting for six hours or more, and T20, 100-ball and T10 matches lasting from 90 minutes to three hours. These variations in length of playing time occur because different formats of cricket have different caps on the number of legal deliveries or days that the innings or overall game can go, with games otherwise theoretically having no limit as to how long they can go. Cricket therefore has special rules about intervals for lunch, tea and drinks as well as rules about when play starts and ends. These rules are outlined in Laws 11 (Intervals) and 12 (Start of play; cessation of play) in the Laws of Cricket.

== When the game is played ==
The game is only played in dry weather. Also, as occasionally balls are bowled at over 100 mph (160 km/h) in first-class cricket, the game needs to be played in enough light for a batsman to be able to see the ball. Play is therefore halted when it rains (but not usually when it drizzles) and when there is bad light. Some one-day games and Test matches are now played under floodlights. The first day/night Test match was played between Australia and New Zealand in Adelaide, in November 2015, and was deemed a success, leading to further day/night Tests being scheduled. Day/night Test cricket is played with a pink ball as opposed to the traditional red ball to aid visibility. Apart from some experimental One Day International series in Australia's roofed Marvel Stadium, cricket is played outdoors.

These requirements mean that in England, Australia, New Zealand, South Africa and Zimbabwe the game is played in the summer.

In the West Indies, India, Pakistan, Sri Lanka and Bangladesh games are played in the winter. In these countries the hurricane and typhoon season coincides with summer. This has another effect. Games start earlier in these places than in the countries which play cricket as a summer sport. In these countries games start at around 09:30 rather than the 10:30 or 11:00 start time used in England, say, so that play for the day is complete before dusk, which may be as early as 17:30.

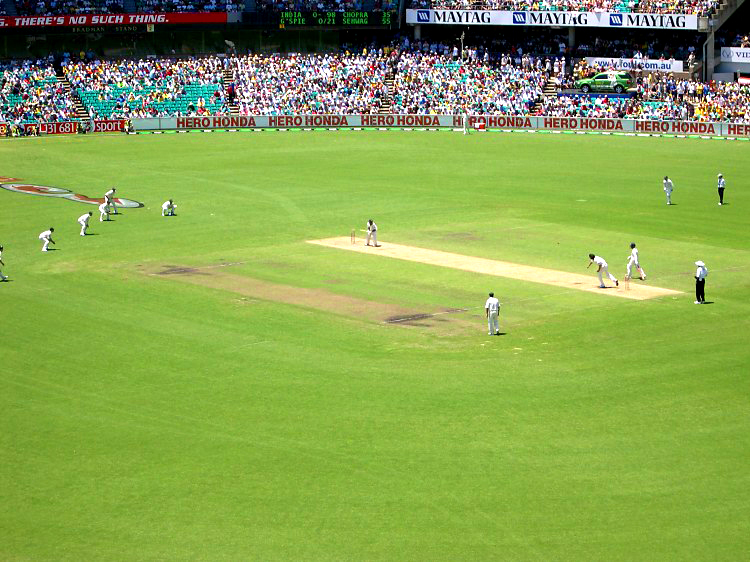
A cricket match in progress on 2 January 2004 in Sydney in the Australian summer.

== Starting and finishing play ==
A game or day starts when the umpire at the bowler's end calls 'Play'. 'Play' is also called to restart the game after an interval or interruption. Before an interval in or interruption of play, and at the end of a match, the umpire at the bowler's end calls 'Time' and removes the bails from both of the wickets. The bowling side cannot make an appeal for a dismissal after 'Time' has been called.

The game finishes when the first of three things happens:

1. There is a result, so that one of the teams has won or the team batting last has lost all its wickets with both teams having the same score thereby giving a tie;
2. The later of the minimum number of overs for the last hour are completed and the agreed time for the end of the game has been reached (see notes below);
3. If the players leave the field, either for adverse conditions of ground, weather or light, or in exceptional circumstances, and no further play is possible.

Notes:

1. In one-day cricket the second of these is replaced by the requirement that the agreed number of overs has been reached.
2. The term last hour can be a misnomer. One hour before the scheduled end of the game, the last hour starts. An agreed minimum number of overs (usually 15 in Test match cricket and 20 in other first-class cricket games) is bowled. The last hour therefore lasts either for the longer of 60 minutes, or the time it takes to bowl the agreed minimum number of overs. This rule is there to prevent time wasting by a team that looks likely to lose a game.
3. Today, Test matches are played under a set of conditions agreed by the boards of the competing countries. These are highly standardised. Days are scheduled as six hours of playing time, but there is a requirement that a minimum of 90 six-ball overs are bowled, and the third session may run overtime if the over rate has been slower than this. If there is a change of innings, two overs are deducted from the requirement.
4. If there are interruptions to play due to weather or bad light, the scheduled stumps time may be extended by up to one hour to compensate (light permitting). If more than an hour's play is lost, time may be added on subsequent days.

== Intervals ==
Because of the length of the game, there are a number of intervals that occur in a game of cricket. These are:

- The period between close of play on one day and the start of the next day's play.
- Intervals between innings.
- Intervals for meals (lunch/dinner and tea).
- Intervals for drinks.

There are special rules setting out the duration of each interval. The interval between innings lasts for 10 minutes. In Test cricket, lunch (or, in the case of day/night Test matches, dinner) will last for 40 minutes and tea for 20 minutes.

Before the coin toss to determine which side bats first, the hours of play, including the timing and duration of intervals for meals or any non-standard interval, are agreed. However, if nine wickets are down when the agreed time for lunch or tea is reached (so that the bowling team only needs one more wicket to end the batting team's innings), that interval may be delayed until the end of the innings, with a maximum delay of 30 minutes. In a one-day game the teams may agree to take the interval for tea between innings rather than have a separate interval. Also, the teams and umpires sometimes agree to have other intervals. This may be to allow the teams to be presented to an important visitor or to allow time for a presentation or acclamation when a player breaks a significant record. Other intervals may be varied slightly if a wicket falls shortly before the interval is scheduled to be taken.

Drinks intervals are agreed at the start of each day, but are not taken during the last hour of the match. Drinks intervals are particularly important when the game is played in hot climates. Games being played in heat of 40 °C (104 °F) and above are not unknown. According to Law 11.8, a drinks interval "shall be kept as short as possible and in any case shall not exceed 5 minutes".

== Pace-of-play regulations ==
=== International cricket rules ===
In international limited-overs cricket, there is a time limit of 60 seconds between overs, and a 5-run penalty is awarded to the batting team if the fielding team fails to begin bowling the next over by the end of the 60 seconds. However, the first two breaches of this rule by the fielding team result only in a warning.

In test cricket, these warnings are reset after an innings has reached 80 overs.

== Notable games ==
A number of games are notable for either their length or because they were played through adverse conditions that would usually see the game called off.

=== The longest Test ===
Test match cricket is international cricket played over three or more days. Nowadays all men's Test matches are scheduled over five days. In the past some Tests were 'timeless', that is, they were scheduled to be played to their conclusion regardless of how long that took. The longest Test on record was between South Africa and England in Durban, South Africa. The game started on 3 March 1939 and play continued on the 4th, 6th, 7th, 8th, 9th, 10th, 13th and the 14th. Play was scheduled for the 11th, but none was possible because of rain, giving 9 days of actual play and 10 days of scheduled play. By the evening of 14 March England were 316 & 654–5 chasing South Africa's 530 & 481, needing just 42 more runs for victory. However, England needed to leave Durban the following day to catch their boat home, so, despite being a 'timeless' Test, a draw was agreed. England's 654 is the highest ever Test cricket score for teams batting last (beating the next highest by more than 200 runs).

== See also ==
- World's longest cricket marathon
