= Fielding restrictions (cricket) =

Cricket rules

In the sport of cricket, different fielding restrictions are imposed depending on the type of match. They are used to discourage certain bowling tactics, or to encourage the batsmen to play big shots, enabling them to hit fours and sixes. Each team has nine fielders other than the wicket-keeper and bowler. The captain decides the fielding positions usually after consulting with the bowler. In Test cricket matches, the fielding restrictions are relaxed as compared to a One Day International.

== All forms ==
In all forms of cricket, only two fielders are allowed in the quadrant between the fielding positions of square leg and long stop. This is to prevent the outlawed and controversial bodyline tactics from being used. No fielder is allowed on or over the pitch until the batsman has had a chance to play the ball.

== One day cricket ==
Various rules concerning fielding have applied during the history of one day cricket, with the dual aim of encouraging the batsman to play attacking shots and to prevent the fielding team from being too defensive by posting all their fielders on the boundary. The current rules applying to One Day Internationals were first introduced as trial rules in July 2001, and are also used for some other limited overs tournaments.

A limited number of fielders are allowed in outfield during powerplay.

=== Men's Fielding Restriction Circles ===
An oval shall be made by drawing two semi-circles on the field of play. The semi-circles shall have as their centre the middle stump at either end of the pitch. The radius of each of the semi-circles shall be 30 yards (27 m). The semi-circles shall be linked by lines which are drawn parallel to the pitch. This line, is commonly known as the circle. Further, two circles centered on each wicket of 15 yards (14 m) radius are drawn and combined encompasses an area known as the close infield. During the first 10 overs of a 50-over innings a maximum of two fielders are allowed to be deployed in the outfield. Before July 2015, a minimum of two fielders (other than the bowler and wicket-keeper) had to be deployed in the close infield during Powerplay 1. If the number of overs in the innings is restricted to less than 24, the length of the fielding restrictions is reduced to eight or nine overs. At least 3 fielders must remain on either the Off or Leg Side.

T10 cricket has the same restrictions as T20 but for half of the bowling period. In other words: a maximum of two fielders outside the circle for the first six overs.

The dimensions of the infield and outfield are slightly smaller than the men's but the principle of restrictions is the same.

=== Women's Fielding Restriction Circles ===
In the Women's game the infield is smaller than in the Men's game but the close infield is the same. The semicircles of the infield have a radius of 23 metres (25 yd).

The restriction of having a maximum of three fielders in the outfield is applied for a further two blocks of five overs, with the captains of the fielding and the batting sides deciding the timing of one block each. These five-over spells are called Powerplay 2 and Powerplay 3 and may be shortened if the length of the innings is restricted (Powerplay 1 is the first block of 10). Powerplays were first introduced in the One Day International between England and Australia on 7 July 2005.

For the rest of the innings, a more generous maximum of five fielders in the outfield applies.

=== History ===
Fielding restrictions were first introduced in the Australian 1980–81 season. By 1992, only two fielders were allowed outside the circle in the first fifteen overs, then five fielders allowed outside the circle for the remaining overs. This was shortened to ten overs in 2005, and two five-over powerplays were introduced, with the bowling team having discretion over the timing for both. In 2008, the batting team was given discretion for the timing of one of the two powerplays. In 2011, the teams were restricted to completing the discretionary powerplays between the 16th and 40th overs; previously, the powerplays could take place at any time between the 11th and 50th overs.

On October 30, 2012, changes to the rules for fielding restrictions in one-day matches were officially implemented by the ICC. The number of Powerplay blocks were reduced to two; the first occurs within the first 10 overs, restricting the team to two fielders outside the 30-yard circle. The second block, the Batting Powerplay with a restriction of three fielders outside the circle, must occur by the 40th over. The number of fielders outside the 30-yard circle in non-Powerplay overs has also been reduced to four (from five).

In June 2015 rules changed to do away with batting powerplay, and allowed up to 5 fielders outside the circle in last 10 overs. The 2015 rule changes also included the removal of batting power play.

== Twenty20 ==
The number of players in the outfield area is the same as for the One-day format, but the restriction lasts for the first six of the twenty overs, and there is no "Batting" or "Bowling" Powerplay (Powerplays 2 and 3 in ODI's). Whereas in Twenty20 format a team can have maximum of five fielders outside 30 yards (27 m) (25 yards (23 m) for women) after first six overs of twenty overs.

In Australia's Big Bash League the mandatory powerplay lasts only the first four overs of an innings, and the second window of inner-circle restrictions — known as the Power Surge — is held back for two overs that the batting side may call at any point from the eleventh over.

== See also ==
- Powerplay (cricket)
