= Daisy Stanley =

English semi-professional cricketer (1870 – 1949)

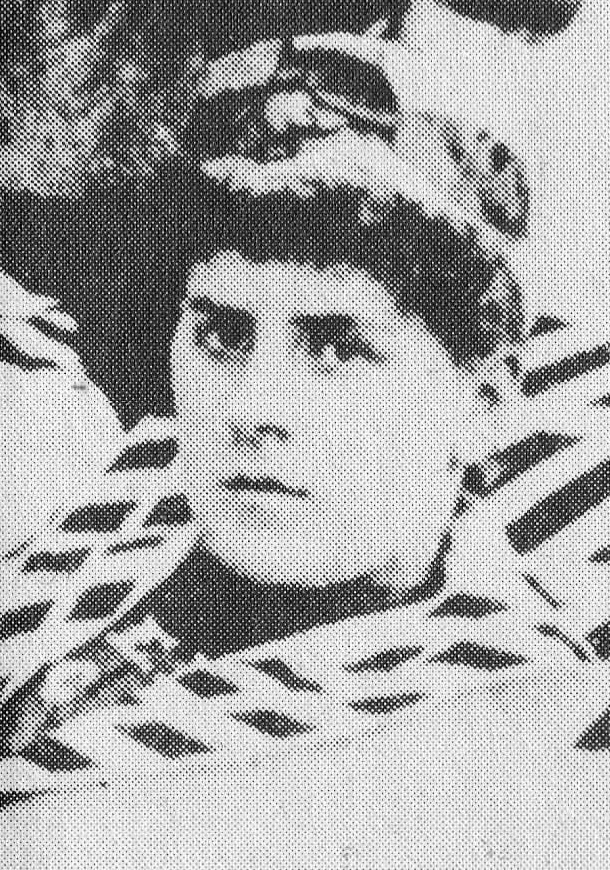

Daisy Stanley (sometimes spelled Daisie, real name Daisy Anita Berry, 1870 – 1949) was an English semi-professional cricketer. A left-arm bowler, she served as the captain of the Blue Eleven in the Original English Lady Cricketers in their tour of 1890, and then ran her own touring side, the ‘All England Lady Cricketers’, in 1891. She also edited ‘The English Lady Cricketers’ Gazette’, the publication of the Original English Lady Cricketers.

Daisy was born on 27 October 1870 to a bricklayer and clerk. She claimed to have been from Chetnole, but seems to have been born in Fulham. Prior to joining the OELC, she worked as an instructor at Alexandra House Gymnasium and as a dressmaker.

As well as captaining the Blue team, Stanley was involved with collecting tickets and choreographing the evening entertainment which followed the OELC’s cricket matches. It was once reported that she had designed their uniforms. After her cricket tours, Stanley also put on an exhibition of ‘Lady Athletes’ in Liverpool in 1892.

In 1906, she married a signwriter, Arthur Williams. She died in Fulham in 1949.
