= Powerplay (cricket) =

Fielding restriction in limited overs cricket

Powerplay refers to the fielding restrictions in limited-overs cricket. It was first introduced in the 1980-81 Australian season. Fielding Restrictions have been part of ODI cricket since 1992. It was renamed Powerplay by the ICC in 2005.

Unlike in Test cricket, the fielders are spread out to save runs in limited-overs cricket. The powerplay rules, along with a number of other factors, have contributed to the big scores in modern One Day Internationals since 1992.

== Rules ==
One Day International (ODI) and Twenty20 differ in terms of the number of overs where mandatory powerplay rules apply. The rules below apply only when a match is uninterrupted.

=== ODI ===
- During the first 10 overs of an innings, a maximum of two fielders are allowed outside the 30-yard circle (27 metres). This is called the 1st powerplay.
- Between overs 11 and 40, a maximum of four fielders are allowed outside the 30-yard circle.
- In the final 10 overs (41–50), a maximum of five fielders are allowed to field outside the 30-yard circle.

=== Twenty20 ===
In most domestic leagues and international Twenty20 cricket, the first six overs of an innings are a mandatory powerplay, with only two fielders allowed outside the 30-yard circle. Beginning with the seventh over, no more than five fielders are allowed outside the 30-yard circle.

However, in Australia's Big Bash League the Powerplay is only the first 4 overs, with the batters choosing when the same restrictions apply for 2 overs in the second half of the innings, in a period called a Powersurge. The batting side could call for this at any point from the 11th over of their innings.

=== 100-ball cricket ===
The powerplay restrictions are active during the first 25 legal balls of the innings, with only two fielders allowed outside the 30-yard circle.

== History ==
Fielding restrictions evolved through the 1970s, notably in World Series Cricket, and were first introduced in ODIs in 1980 in Australia. The most common rule was for only two fielders to be allowed outside the circle in the first ten overs, then five fielders allowed outside the circle for the remaining overs.

The powerplay nomenclature was introduced by the International Cricket Council in 2005, when the fielding restrictions were split into 3 blocks: the mandatory ten overs at the start of the innings and two further five-over powerplays with the bowling team being able to choose the timing of both. In practice though, both were generally taken as soon as possible, effectively leading to a single block of 20 overs of fielding restrictions. To counter this, in 2008, the batting team was given discretion for the timing of one of the two powerplays.

From 1 October 2011, the ICC brought additional changes to the bowling and batting powerplays. Under the new rules, in a 50-over match, neither of the two five-over powerplays may be taken before the start of the 16th over and both must be completed before the commencement of the 41st over, so overs 11 to 15 and 41 to 50 cannot be powerplay overs. Should either or both teams choose not to exercise their discretion, their powerplay overs will automatically commence at the latest available point in the innings (e.g. in a 50-over innings with one unclaimed powerplay, it will begin at the start of the 36th over).

On 29 October 2012, the ICC made further amendments on powerplays, reducing the number of blocks of powerplays from three to two.

From 1992 to 2012, during non-powerplay overs a total of five fielders were allowed outside the circle. This was changed to four in October 2012. Moreover, from 1992 to 2015, two fielders were required in catching positions in the first ten overs.

From 5 July 2015, the ICC further amended the rules, making the whole innings as a composition of 3 powerplays, thus removing the batting powerplay previously introduced. Furthermore, the restriction of two catching fielders on the first powerplay was relaxed.
