= Bail (cricket) =

Part of the wicket

In the sport of cricket, a bail is one of the two smaller sticks placed on top of the three stumps to form a wicket. The bails are used to determine when the wicket is broken or put down, which in turn is one of the critical factors in determining whether a batter is out bowled, stumped, run out or hit wicket.

A wicket consists of three stumps that are hammered into the ground, and topped with two bails.

The wicket is considered to be broken if one or both of the bails fall from the stumps, or a stump is struck out of the ground, by:

- the ball,
- the striking batters bat, or any part of the striker's body or clothing (even if it falls off), or
- a fielder with the hand or arm holding the ball.

This means, for example, that if the ball hits the wicket directly from the bowler's delivery, the batter is only out bowled if a bail falls off, so a ball can actually brush or rest against the stumps without the batsman being dismissed (as long as the bail remains in its groove).

If a bail falls off the stumps for any other reason while the ball is still in play, and a later incident such as a ran out attempt requires the wicket to be broken, then the other bail can be removed (if it has not yet fallen off), or a stump can be struck out of the cricket ground or pulled up, as described above.

Each bail is made of a single cylindrically shaped piece of wood which has two smaller cylinders of wood protruding from each end. The large central cylinder is called the barrel and the smaller protrusions are the spigots. The spigots are of unequal length: the longer rests alone on one stump, while the shorter rests on the middle stump together with the short spigot of the other bail.

Special heavy bails made of denser wood (usually lignum vitae) are sometimes used in windy conditions if the normal light bails are likely to be blown off the stumps. The umpires can decide to dispense with the bails completely (for example, where strong gusts of wind would remove even the heavy bails), in which case the umpires will adjudge whether or not the wicket is broken, however, Hawk-Eye graphics, part of the Decision Review System, still assumes the bails are on the stump.

== Quotation ==
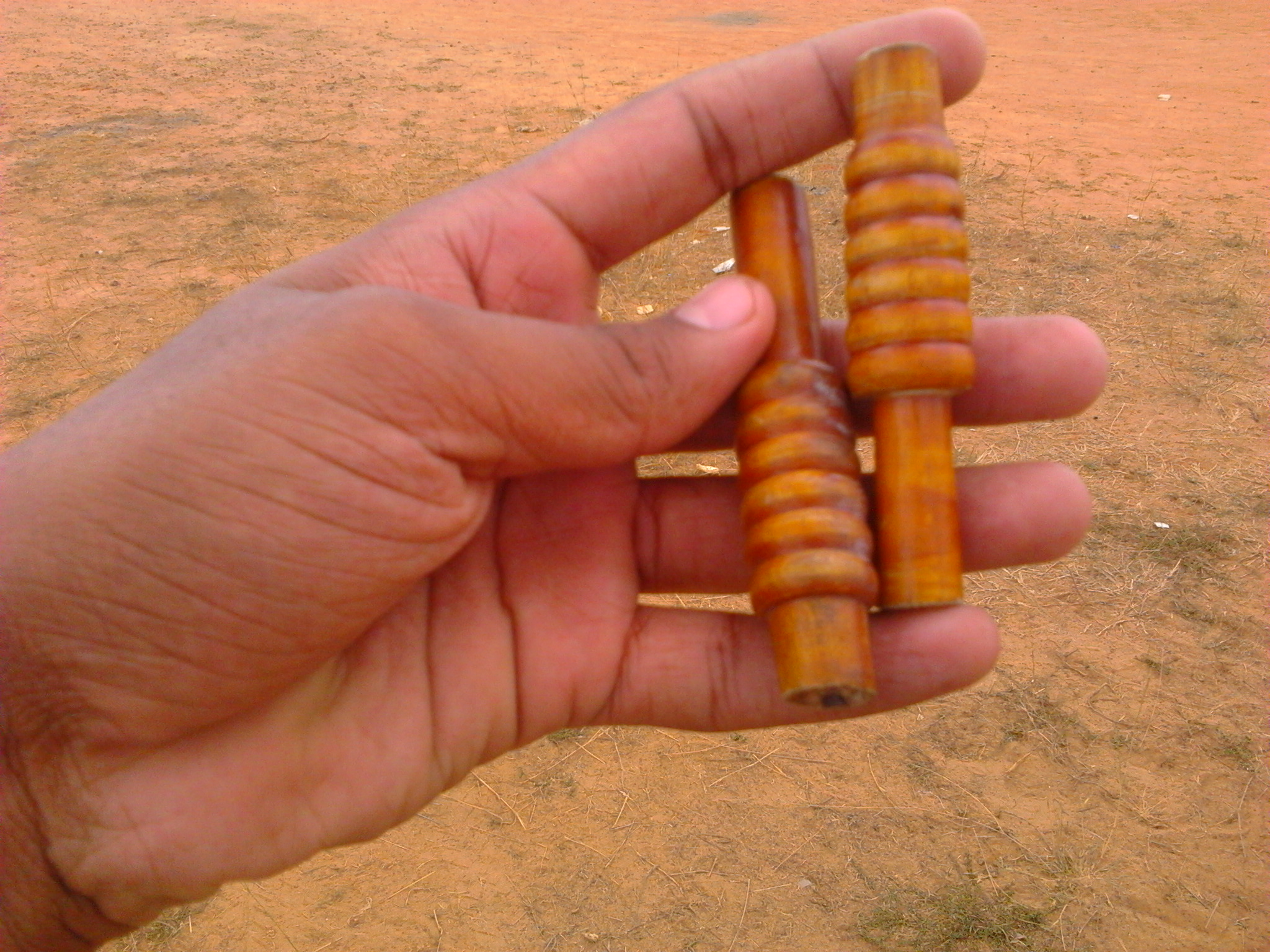
The bails

An excerpt from Law 8(3)(b) of the Laws of cricket:

Each bail shall conform to the following specifications:
- Overall length:- 4 5/16 in/10.95cm
- Length of barrel:- 2 1/8 in/5.40cm
- Longer spigot:- 1 3/8 in/3.49cm
- Shorter spigot:- 13/16 in/2.06cm

== See also ==
- Cricket clothing and equipment
