= Stump (cricket) =

One of the three vertical posts that support the bails and form the wicket

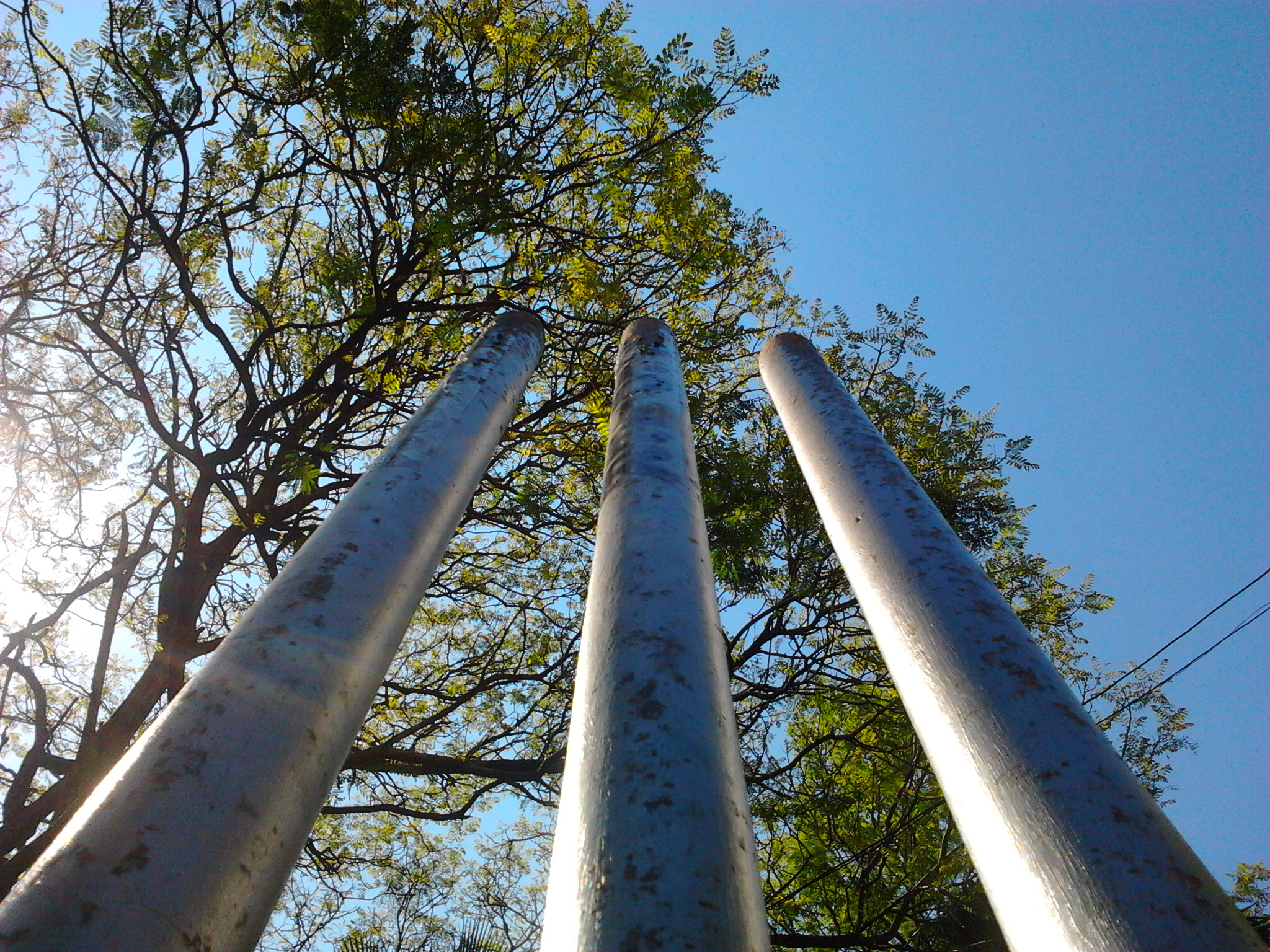
Cricket stumps without bails

In cricket, the stumps are the three vertical posts that support the bails and form the wicket. Stumping or being stumped is a method of dismissing a batsman.

The umpire calling stumps means the play is over for the day.

== Part of the wicket ==
A wicket consists of three stumps that are inserted into the ground, and topped with two bails.

The stumps are three vertical posts which support two bails. The stumps and bails are usually made of wood, most commonly ash, and together form a wicket at each end of the pitch.

The overall width of each wicket is 9 inches (22.9 cm). Each stump is 28 inches (71.1 cm) tall with maximum and minimum diameters of 1 1/2 inches (3.81 cm) and 1 3/8 inches (3.49 cm). They have a spike at one end for inserting into the ground, and the other end has a U-shaped 'through groove' to provide a resting place for the bails. In junior cricket the items have smaller dimensions.

Each stump is referred to by a specific name:

- Off stump is the stump on the off side of the wicket (the same side as the batsman's bat).
- Middle stump is the centre stump, the middle of the three stumps.
- Leg stump is the stump on the on side of the wicket (the same side as the batsman's legs).

These names are relative to the batsman, so a right-handed batsman's leg stump becomes the off stump when a left-handed player is batting.

=== Modern innovations ===
In modern professional play, the stumps are often branded with a sponsor's logo. Although they are too far away from spectators to be seen, such logos are visible on television coverage.

==== Stump cam ====
For professional matches, often one or more of the stumps is hollow and contains a small television camera. This is aligned vertically, but can view through a small window on the side of the stump via a mirror. The so-called stump-cam gives a unique view of play for action replays, particularly when a batsman is bowled.

==== LED bails (light-up stumps) ====
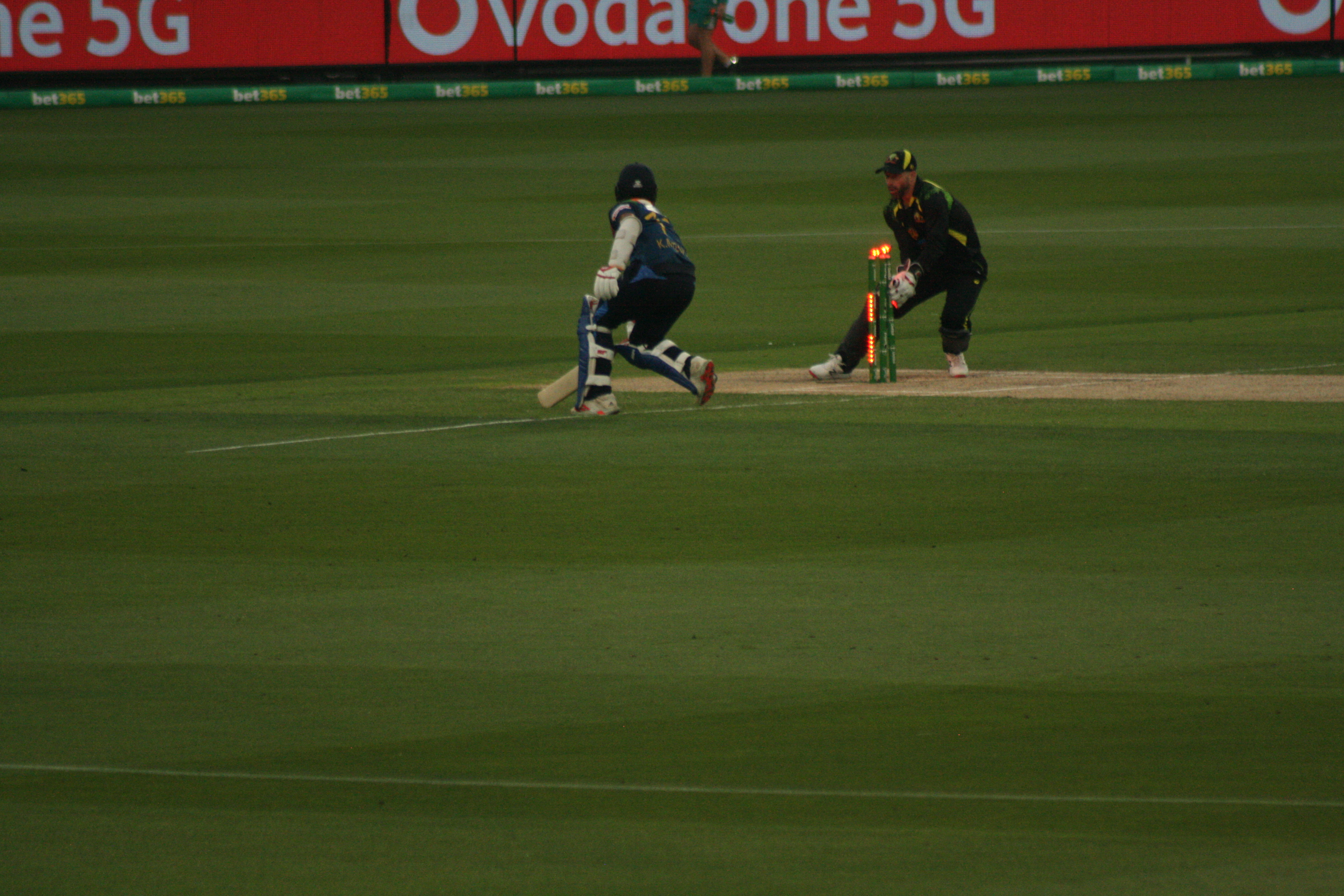
The LED bails light up as Matthew Wade attempts to run out Kusal Mendis, 2022

A recent innovation are stumps and bails embedded with red LEDs, which flash when they are completely dislodged. Invented by an Australian engineer and trademarked as "LED Bails", they were designed to aid umpires with both run-out and stumping decisions as well as provide distinctive images to television coverage during day-night matches. LED stumps were first used at the 2014 ICC World T20, and have since become commonplace in major white-ball matches like ODIs or franchise T20 leagues. They have also been used in day/night Test matches.

== Manner of dismissing a batsman ==
Stumps are very important in the game of cricket as they determine when the wicket is "put down". The instant the bails are dislodged from the top of the stumps, the wicket is put down (there are other ways in which a wicket can be put down if the bails have already been removed).

- If the wicket is put down with the ball after it has gone past the batsman during a fair delivery (regardless of whether the ball made contact with the batsman's body or bat), they are bowled.
- If a batsman is out of their ground (that is, no part of their body or bat is behind the popping crease, the line in front of the stumps) whilst attempting to take a run, they are run out.
- If a batsman is out of their ground and the wicket is put down by the wicket-keeper before attempting to take a run, they are stumped.
- If the wicket is put down by the batsman's body, bat (including debris if it has broken) or any part of their clothing before attempting a run, they are hit wicket.

== End of the day's play ==
Stumps is also used as a term to mean the end of a day's play, e.g. "The umpires called stumps" means that the umpires have declared that play is over for the day. At the end of a session, i.e. before lunch or tea, the umpires will remove the bails; at the end of the day's play, the umpires will also remove the stumps.

== See also ==
- Cricket clothing and equipment
- Stump microphone
